= 2008 ITF Women's Circuit (July–September) =

The ITF Women's Circuit is the second-tier tour for women's professional tennis organised by the International Tennis Federation, and is the tier below the WTA Tour. In 2008, the ITF Women's Circuit included tournaments with prize money ranging from $10,000 up to $100,000.

This article covers the ITF tour from the month of July until September.

== Schedule ==
=== Key ===
$100,000 tournaments
$75,000 tournaments
$50,000 tournaments
$25,000 tournaments
$10,000 tournaments

=== July ===
Week	Tournament	Winner	Runner-up	Semi finalists	Quarter finalists	Refs
July 7, 2008	(Belgium) Brussels, Belgium; Clay $10,000	(Netherlands) Daniëlle Harmsen; 6–1 6–2	(France) Émilie Bacquet	(Hong Kong) Zhang Ling (France) Sherazad Benamar	(Netherlands) Bibiane Schoofs (France) Nathalie Mohn (Slovakia) Martina Balogová (Belgium) Anouk Delefortrie	
July 7, 2008	(Belgium) Brussels, Belgium; Clay $10,000	(Netherlands) Daniëlle Harmsen (Netherlands) Kim Kilsdonk; 6–4 5–3 ret.	(Belarus) Volha Duko (Belgium) Ineke Mergaert	(Hong Kong) Zhang Ling (France) Sherazad Benamar	(Netherlands) Bibiane Schoofs (France) Nathalie Mohn (Slovakia) Martina Balogová (Belgium) Anouk Delefortrie	
July 7, 2008	Bucharest, Romania; Clay $10,000	(Romania) Elora Dabija; 7–5 6–4	(Romania) Ionela-Andreea Iova	(Romania) Camelia Hristea (Romania) Diana Enache	(Romania) Alexandra Cadanțu (Germany) Bianca Koch (Australia) Bianca Chidrawi (Romania) Irina-Camelia Begu	
July 7, 2008	Bucharest, Romania; Clay $10,000	(Romania) Irina-Camelia Begu (Romania) Ioana Gașpar; 4–6 6–3 [10–3]	(Romania) Mihaela-Florina Bunea (Romania) Gabriela Niculescu	(Romania) Camelia Hristea (Romania) Diana Enache	(Romania) Alexandra Cadanțu (Germany) Bianca Koch (Australia) Bianca Chidrawi (Romania) Irina-Camelia Begu	
July 7, 2008	Garching bei München, Germany; Clay $10,000	(Sweden) Hanna Nooni; 6–2 7–5	(Slovakia) Michaela Pochabová	(Germany) Korina Perkovic (Germany) Kristina Steiert	(Germany) Carmen Klaschka (Germany) Syna Kayser (Romania) Ana-Maria Nedelcu (Austria) Janina Toljan	
July 7, 2008	Garching bei München, Germany; Clay $10,000	(Croatia) Vlatka Jovanović (Argentina) Salome Llaguno; 1–6 6–2 [10–6]	(New Zealand) Shona Lee (Germany) Dominice Ripoll	(Germany) Korina Perkovic (Germany) Kristina Steiert	(Germany) Carmen Klaschka (Germany) Syna Kayser (Romania) Ana-Maria Nedelcu (Austria) Janina Toljan	
July 7, 2008	Prokuplje, Serbia; Clay $10,000	(Serbia) Bojana Jovanovski; 6–0 6–1	(Slovakia) Karin Morgošová	(Russia) Natalia Orlova (Australia) Marija Mirkovic	(Serbia) Karolina Jovanović (Italy) Vivienne Vierin (Belgium) Davinia Lobbinger (Serbia) Ljubica Avramović	
July 7, 2008	Prokuplje, Serbia; Clay $10,000	(Serbia) Ljubica Avramović (Russia) Valeria Savinykh w/o	(Serbia) Zorica Petrov (Slovenia) Anja Prislan	(Russia) Natalia Orlova (Australia) Marija Mirkovic	(Serbia) Karolina Jovanović (Italy) Vivienne Vierin (Belgium) Davinia Lobbinger (Serbia) Ljubica Avramović	
July 7, 2008	Tokyo, Japan; Carpet $10,000	(South Korea) Chae Kyung-yee; 6–3 1–6 6–3	(Japan) Yumi Miyazaki	(Japan) Ayaka Maekawa (Japan) Ayumi Oka	(South Korea) Chang Kyung-mi (Japan) Anastasia Malhotra (Japan) Sakiko Shamizu (Japan) Shuko Aoyama	
July 7, 2008	Tokyo, Japan; Carpet $10,000	(South Korea) Chae Kyung-yee (South Korea) Chang Kyung-mi; 3–6 6–2 [10–7]	(Japan) Ayumi Oka (Thailand) Varatchaya Wongteanchai	(Japan) Ayaka Maekawa (Japan) Ayumi Oka	(South Korea) Chang Kyung-mi (Japan) Anastasia Malhotra (Japan) Sakiko Shamizu (Japan) Shuko Aoyama	
July 7, 2008	Bogotá, Colombia; Clay $25,000	(Colombia) Mariana Duque; 6–0 6–4	(Bolivia) María Fernanda Álvarez Terán	(Spain) Eva Fernández Brugués (Argentina) Mailen Auroux	(Italy) Nicole Clerico (Italy) Martina Caciotti (Brazil) Vivian Segnini (Colombia) Viky Núñez Fuentes	
July 7, 2008	Bogotá, Colombia; Clay $25,000	(Colombia) Mariana Duque (Colombia) Viky Núñez Fuentes; 6–3 6–4	(Argentina) Mailen Auroux (Italy) Nicole Clerico	(Spain) Eva Fernández Brugués (Argentina) Mailen Auroux	(Italy) Nicole Clerico (Italy) Martina Caciotti (Brazil) Vivian Segnini (Colombia) Viky Núñez Fuentes	
July 7, 2008	(United Kingdom) Felixstowe, Great Britain; Grass $25,000	(Portugal) Neuza Silva; 6–3 6–2	(United Kingdom) Sarah Borwell	(Czech Republic) Nikola Fraňková (United Kingdom) Tara Moore	(United Kingdom) Jade Curtis (United Kingdom) Elizabeth Thomas (France) Irena Pavlovic (United Kingdom) Naomi Broady	
July 7, 2008	(United Kingdom) Felixstowe, Great Britain; Grass $25,000	(United Kingdom) Sarah Borwell (United States) Courtney Nagle; 7–5 6–3	(Czech Republic) Nikola Fraňková (United Kingdom) Anna Hawkins	(Czech Republic) Nikola Fraňková (United Kingdom) Tara Moore	(United Kingdom) Jade Curtis (United Kingdom) Elizabeth Thomas (France) Irena Pavlovic (United Kingdom) Naomi Broady	
July 7, 2008	Rome, Italy; Clay $25,000	(Australia) Jessica Moore; 6–3 6–2	(Austria) Patricia Mayr	(Ukraine) Oxana Lyubtsova (Mauritius) Marinne Giraud	(Italy) Anna Floris (Georgia (country)) Sofia Shapatava (Italy) Giulia Gabba (France) Aurélie Védy	
July 7, 2008	Rome, Italy; Clay $25,000	(Latvia) Irina Kuzmina (Ukraine) Oxana Lyubtsova; 6–4 4–6 [10–7]	(Ukraine) Irina Buryachok (Austria) Patricia Mayr	(Ukraine) Oxana Lyubtsova (Mauritius) Marinne Giraud	(Italy) Anna Floris (Georgia (country)) Sofia Shapatava (Italy) Giulia Gabba (France) Aurélie Védy	
July 7, 2008	Valladolid, Spain; Hard $25,000	(Spain) Estrella Cabeza Candela; 6–4 7–6^{(4)}	(Portugal) Frederica Piedade	(Spain) Sara del Barrio Aragón (Greece) Anna Gerasimou	(Switzerland) Stefania Boffa (Spain) Paula Fondevila Castro (Austria) Melanie Klaffner (Spain) Maite Gabarrús-Alonso	
July 7, 2008	Valladolid, Spain; Hard $25,000	(Canada) Heidi El Tabakh (United States) Story Tweedie-Yates; 6–2 6–4	(Switzerland) Stefania Boffa (United Kingdom) Anna Fitzpatrick	(Spain) Sara del Barrio Aragón (Greece) Anna Gerasimou	(Switzerland) Stefania Boffa (Spain) Paula Fondevila Castro (Austria) Melanie Klaffner (Spain) Maite Gabarrús-Alonso	
July 7, 2008	Allentown, Pennsylvania, United States; Hard $50,000	(Venezuela) Milagros Sequera; 6–2 6–0	(United States) Amanda Fink	(Russia) Regina Kulikova (United States) Lauren Albanese	(Canada) Stéphanie Dubois (United States) Alexis Prousis (Chinese Taipei) Chan Chin-wei (Netherlands) Brenda Schultz-McCarthy	
July 7, 2008	Allentown, Pennsylvania, United States; Hard $50,000	(United States) Carly Gullickson (Australia) Nicole Kriz; 6–2 6–3	(Chinese Taipei) Chan Chin-wei (South Africa) Natalie Grandin	(Russia) Regina Kulikova (United States) Lauren Albanese	(Canada) Stéphanie Dubois (United States) Alexis Prousis (Chinese Taipei) Chan Chin-wei (Netherlands) Brenda Schultz-McCarthy	
July 7, 2008	Zagreb, Croatia; Clay $75,000+H	(Croatia) Petra Martić; 6–2 2–6 6–2	(Austria) Yvonne Meusburger	(Croatia) Jelena Kostanić Tošić (Serbia) Ana Jovanović	(Bosnia and Herzegovina) Sandra Martinović (Germany) Kathrin Wörle (Switzerland) Stefanie Vögele (Russia) Anastasia Pivovarova	
July 7, 2008	Zagreb, Croatia; Clay $75,000+H	(Estonia) Maret Ani (Croatia) Jelena Kostanić Tošić; 6–4 6–2	(Ukraine) Yuliya Beygelzimer (Switzerland) Stefanie Vögele	(Croatia) Jelena Kostanić Tošić (Serbia) Ana Jovanović	(Bosnia and Herzegovina) Sandra Martinović (Germany) Kathrin Wörle (Switzerland) Stefanie Vögele (Russia) Anastasia Pivovarova	
July 14, 2008	Atlanta, United States; Hard $10,000	(United States) Amanda Fink; 6–3 6–2	(Bulgaria) Svetlana Krivencheva	(United States) Julia Cohen (United States) Stacia Fonseca	(United States) Mallory Cecil (United Kingdom) Emily Webley-Smith (United States) Nicole Gibbs (Slovakia) Zuzana Zemenová	
July 14, 2008	Atlanta, United States; Hard $10,000	(United States) Sanaz Marand (United States) Kristi Miller; 6–2 6–4	(United States) Whitney Jones (United States) Tiya Rolle	(United States) Julia Cohen (United States) Stacia Fonseca	(United States) Mallory Cecil (United Kingdom) Emily Webley-Smith (United States) Nicole Gibbs (Slovakia) Zuzana Zemenová	
July 14, 2008	Badajoz, Spain; Hard $10,000	(Chile) Melisa Miranda; 6–4 6–3	(France) Adeline Goncalves	(Serbia) Bojana Borovnica (Spain) Nuria Párrizas Díaz	(Spain) María Teresa Torró Flor (Russia) Julia Parasyuk (Russia) Diana Arutyunova (Spain) Carmen Lopez Blanco	
July 14, 2008	Badajoz, Spain; Hard $10,000	(France) Adeline Goncalves (Australia) Kristina Pejkovic; 7–5 7–5	(Colombia) Karen Castiblanco Duarte (Colombia) Paula Zabala	(Serbia) Bojana Borovnica (Spain) Nuria Párrizas Díaz	(Spain) María Teresa Torró Flor (Russia) Julia Parasyuk (Russia) Diana Arutyunova (Spain) Carmen Lopez Blanco	
July 14, 2008	Balş, Romania; Clay $10,000	(Romania) Elora Dabija; 7–5 6–1	(Israel) Chen Astrogo	(Armenia) Anna Movsisyan (Romania) Ingrid-Alexandra Radu	(Romania) Cristina Stancu (Romania) Alexandra Damaschin (Romania) Alice-Andrada Radu (Romania) Irina-Camelia Begu	
July 14, 2008	Balş, Romania; Clay $10,000	(Romania) Camelia Hristea (Romania) Ionela-Andreea Iova; 2–6 6–4 [10–8]	(Romania) Laura-Ioana Andrei (Romania) Diana Enache	(Armenia) Anna Movsisyan (Romania) Ingrid-Alexandra Radu	(Romania) Cristina Stancu (Romania) Alexandra Damaschin (Romania) Alice-Andrada Radu (Romania) Irina-Camelia Begu	
July 14, 2008	(Colombia) Cartagena, Colombia; Hard $10,000	(Brazil) Vivian Segnini; 7–6^{(8)} 6–2	(Venezuela) Marina Giral Lores	(Colombia) Viky Núñez Fuentes (United States) Nataly Yoo	(United Kingdom) Yasmin Clarke (Argentina) Guadalupe Moreno (Slovenia) Mika Urbančič (Venezuela) Josymar Escalona	
July 14, 2008	(Colombia) Cartagena, Colombia; Hard $10,000	(Colombia) Viky Núñez Fuentes (Colombia) Paula Catalina Robles Garcia w/o	(Peru) Claudia Razzeto (United States) Nataly Yoo	(Colombia) Viky Núñez Fuentes (United States) Nataly Yoo	(United Kingdom) Yasmin Clarke (Argentina) Guadalupe Moreno (Slovenia) Mika Urbančič (Venezuela) Josymar Escalona	
July 14, 2008	(Morocco) Casablanca, Morocco; Clay $10,000	(Portugal) Magali de Lattre; 5–7 6–2 6–3	(France) Chloe Babet	(Morocco) Fatima El Allami (France) Alizé Lim	(Italy) Benedetta Davato (Morocco) Lina Bennani (Morocco) Habiba Ifrakh (Morocco) Lamia Essaadi	
July 14, 2008	(Morocco) Casablanca, Morocco; Clay $10,000	(Italy) Benedetta Davato (Italy) Lisa Sabino; 6–3 6–4	(Spain) Melisa Cabrera Handt (Portugal) Catarina Ferreira	(Morocco) Fatima El Allami (France) Alizé Lim	(Italy) Benedetta Davato (Morocco) Lina Bennani (Morocco) Habiba Ifrakh (Morocco) Lamia Essaadi	
July 14, 2008	(United Kingdom) Frinton, Great Britain; Grass $10,000	(United Kingdom) Tara Moore; 7–5 6–1	(Germany) Mona Barthel	(United Kingdom) Jocelyn Rae (United Kingdom) Elizabeth Thomas	(Czech Republic) Kateřina Kramperová (Austria) Lisa Maria Reichmann (Germany) Svenja Weidemann (United Kingdom) Anastasia Nebojanko	
July 14, 2008	(United Kingdom) Frinton, Great Britain; Grass $10,000	(Australia) Tammi Patterson (Australia) Emelyn Starr; 6–3 7–5	(United Kingdom) Jade Curtis (United Kingdom) Elizabeth Thomas	(United Kingdom) Jocelyn Rae (United Kingdom) Elizabeth Thomas	(Czech Republic) Kateřina Kramperová (Austria) Lisa Maria Reichmann (Germany) Svenja Weidemann (United Kingdom) Anastasia Nebojanko	
July 14, 2008	Imola, Italy; Carpet $10,000	(Italy) Giulia Gatto-Monticone; 6–2 6–1	(Italy) Julia Mayr	(Italy) Gabriella Polito (Italy) Martina Di Giuseppe	(Argentina) Maria-Belen Corbalan (Italy) Erika Zanchetta (Belarus) Tatsiana Kapshai (Slovenia) Petra Pajalič	
July 14, 2008	Imola, Italy; Carpet $10,000	(Italy) Claudia Giovine (Italy) Erika Zanchetta; 7–6^{(5)} 6–4	(United States) Sabrina Capannolo (United States) Christian Thompson	(Italy) Gabriella Polito (Italy) Martina Di Giuseppe	(Argentina) Maria-Belen Corbalan (Italy) Erika Zanchetta (Belarus) Tatsiana Kapshai (Slovenia) Petra Pajalič	
July 14, 2008	Darmstadt, Germany; Clay $25,000	(Australia) Jelena Dokić; 6–0 6–0	(Netherlands) Michelle Gerards	(Poland) Anna Korzeniak (Germany) Korina Perkovic	(Ukraine) Yuliya Beygelzimer (Czech Republic) Veronika Chvojková (Slovakia) Monika Kochanová (Germany) Carmen Klaschka	
July 14, 2008	Darmstadt, Germany; Clay $25,000	(Canada) Heidi El Tabakh (Finland) Emma Laine; 6–3 6–4	(Netherlands) Michelle Gerards (Netherlands) Marcella Koek	(Poland) Anna Korzeniak (Germany) Korina Perkovic	(Ukraine) Yuliya Beygelzimer (Czech Republic) Veronika Chvojková (Slovakia) Monika Kochanová (Germany) Carmen Klaschka	
July 14, 2008	Miyazaki, Japan; Carpet $25,000	(Japan) Kimiko Date-Krumm; 6–3 6–2	(South Korea) Chae Kyung-yee	(Japan) Akiko Yonemura (Japan) Tomoko Yonemura	(South Korea) Lee Jin-a (Japan) Yurika Sema (Thailand) Suchanun Viratprasert (Japan) Kurumi Nara	
July 14, 2008	Miyazaki, Japan; Carpet $25,000	(Japan) Misaki Doi (Japan) Kurimi Nara; 4–6 6–3 [10–7]	(Japan) Kimiko Date-Krumm (Japan) Tomoko Yonemura	(Japan) Akiko Yonemura (Japan) Tomoko Yonemura	(South Korea) Lee Jin-a (Japan) Yurika Sema (Thailand) Suchanun Viratprasert (Japan) Kurumi Nara	
July 14, 2008	Zwevegem, Belgium; Clay $25,000	(Belarus) Ksenia Milevskaya; 6–4 3–6 7–6^{(5)}	(Netherlands) Arantxa Rus	(Bosnia and Herzegovina) Sandra Martinović (Slovakia) Lenka Wienerová	(Poland) Aleksandra Grela (France) Diana Brunel (Slovenia) Tadeja Majerič (Germany) Anne Schäfer	
July 14, 2008	Zwevegem, Belgium; Clay $25,000	(Netherlands) Daniëlle Harmsen (Netherlands) Kim Kilsdonk; 6–4 6–2	(Czech Republic) Iveta Gerlová (Slovenia) Tadeja Majerič	(Bosnia and Herzegovina) Sandra Martinović (Slovakia) Lenka Wienerová	(Poland) Aleksandra Grela (France) Diana Brunel (Slovenia) Tadeja Majerič (Germany) Anne Schäfer	
July 14, 2008	Contrexéville, France; Clay $50,000	(Romania) Ioana Raluca Olaru; 6–4 6–2	(France) Stéphanie Foretz	(Luxembourg) Mandy Minella (Argentina) Agustina Lepore	(Portugal) Neuza Silva (Italy) Nathalie Viérin (Australia) Jessica Moore (Serbia) Teodora Mirčić	
July 14, 2008	Contrexéville, France; Clay $50,000	(France) Stéphanie Foretz (France) Aurélie Védy; 6–4 6–4	(Argentina) Erica Krauth (Sweden) Hanna Nooni	(Luxembourg) Mandy Minella (Argentina) Agustina Lepore	(Portugal) Neuza Silva (Italy) Nathalie Viérin (Australia) Jessica Moore (Serbia) Teodora Mirčić	
July 14, 2008	Biella, Italy; Clay $100,000	(Italy) Mara Santangelo; 6–3 6–1	(Croatia) Jelena Kostanić Tošić	(Czech Republic) Barbora Záhlavová-Strýcová (Spain) Lourdes Domínguez Lino	(Ukraine) Yuliana Fedak (Ukraine) Oxana Lyubtsova (Italy) Corinna Dentoni (France) Mathilde Johansson	
July 14, 2008	Biella, Italy; Clay $100,000	(Czech Republic) Renata Voráčová (Czech Republic) Barbora Záhlavová-Strýcová; 4–6 6–0 [10–5]	(Spain) Lourdes Domínguez Lino (Spain) Arantxa Parra Santonja	(Czech Republic) Barbora Záhlavová-Strýcová (Spain) Lourdes Domínguez Lino	(Ukraine) Yuliana Fedak (Ukraine) Oxana Lyubtsova (Italy) Corinna Dentoni (France) Mathilde Johansson	
July 21, 2008	Brasília, Brazil; Clay $10,000	(Brazil) Nathalia Rossi; 6–2 6–4	(Brazil) Fernanda Hermenegildo	(Brazil) Larissa Carvalho (Argentina) Carla Beltrami	(Uruguay) Estefanía Craciún (Brazil) Maria Claudia Santos Sant'anna (Brazil) Fernanda Faria (Argentina) Tatiana Búa	
July 21, 2008	Brasília, Brazil; Clay $10,000	(Brazil) Fabiana Chiaparini (Brazil) Carla Tiene; 7–5 4–6 [13–11]	(Argentina) Carla Beltrami (Brazil) Natalia Guitler	(Brazil) Larissa Carvalho (Argentina) Carla Beltrami	(Uruguay) Estefanía Craciún (Brazil) Maria Claudia Santos Sant'anna (Brazil) Fernanda Faria (Argentina) Tatiana Búa	
July 21, 2008	Evansville, Indiana, United States; Hard $10,000	(United States) Megan Moulton-Levy; 6–3 6–4	(United Kingdom) Emily Webley-Smith	(Slovakia) Zuzana Zemenová (United States) Elizabeth Lumpkin	(United States) Anna Lubinsky (United States) Chieh-yu Hsu (United States) Emily Fraser (United States) Nicole Gibbs	
July 21, 2008	Evansville, Indiana, United States; Hard $10,000	(Canada) Rebecca Marino (United States) Ellah Nze; 7–5 6–3	(United States) Courtney Dolehide (United States) Kirsten Flower	(Slovakia) Zuzana Zemenová (United States) Elizabeth Lumpkin	(United States) Anna Lubinsky (United States) Chieh-yu Hsu (United States) Emily Fraser (United States) Nicole Gibbs	
July 21, 2008	Gausdal, Norway; Hard $10,000	(Germany) Svenja Weidemann; 6–2 6–3	(Germany) Mona Barthel	(Romania) Patricia Chirea (France) Marie-Perrine Baudouin	(Australia) Hayley Ericksen (Estonia) Julia Matojan (Russia) Karina Isayan (Norway) Helene Auensen	
July 21, 2008	Gausdal, Norway; Hard $10,000	(South Africa) Tegan Edwards (Netherlands) Marcella Koek; 1–6 6–4 [10–8]	(Germany) Mona Barthel (Germany) Svenja Weidemann	(Romania) Patricia Chirea (France) Marie-Perrine Baudouin	(Australia) Hayley Ericksen (Estonia) Julia Matojan (Russia) Karina Isayan (Norway) Helene Auensen	
July 21, 2008	Horb am Neckar, Germany; Clay $10,000	(Poland) Anna Korzeniak; 2–6 6–3 6–1	(Czech Republic) Simona Dobrá	(Italy) Federica Quercia (Germany) Korina Perkovic	(Germany) Karolina Nowak (Czech Republic) Jana Jandová (Serbia) Zorica Petrov (Germany) Lena-Marie Hofmann	
July 21, 2008	Horb am Neckar, Germany; Clay $10,000	(Czech Republic) Simona Dobrá (Czech Republic) Lucie Kriegsmannová; 2–6 6–3 [10–8]	(Netherlands) Daniëlle Harmsen (Netherlands) Kim Kilsdonk	(Italy) Federica Quercia (Germany) Korina Perkovic	(Germany) Karolina Nowak (Czech Republic) Jana Jandová (Serbia) Zorica Petrov (Germany) Lena-Marie Hofmann	
July 21, 2008	Hunedoara, Romania; Clay $10,000	(Romania) Diana Enache; 6–2 4–6 6–1	(Australia) Marija Mirkovic	(Romania) Antonia Xenia Tout (Romania) Elora Dabija	(Romania) Diana Gae (Romania) Irina-Camelia Begu (Israel) Chen Astrogo (Romania) Laura-Ioana Andrei	
July 21, 2008	Hunedoara, Romania; Clay $10,000	(Romania) Irina-Camelia Begu (Romania) Elora Dabija; 7–5 6–2	(Slovakia) Katarina Poljaková (Slovakia) Zuzana Zlochová	(Romania) Antonia Xenia Tout (Romania) Elora Dabija	(Romania) Diana Gae (Romania) Irina-Camelia Begu (Israel) Chen Astrogo (Romania) Laura-Ioana Andrei	
July 21, 2008	Jesi, Italy; Hard $10,000	(Italy) Claudia Giovine; 6–2 6–3	(Italy) Cristina Celani	(Italy) Raffaella Bindi (Italy) Giulia Gasparri	(Italy) Alice Balducci (Italy) Alessia Bertoia (Belgium) Appollonia Melzani (Italy) Elena Bertoia	
July 21, 2008	Jesi, Italy; Hard $10,000	(Italy) Alice Balducci (Italy) Federica Denti; 6–4 6–3	(Italy) Giulia Bruzzone (Serbia) Aleksandra Markovic	(Italy) Raffaella Bindi (Italy) Giulia Gasparri	(Italy) Alice Balducci (Italy) Alessia Bertoia (Belgium) Appollonia Melzani (Italy) Elena Bertoia	
July 21, 2008	Rabat, Morocco; Clay $10,000	(Italy) Lisa Sabino; 6–1 6–4	(Russia) Valeria Savinykh	(Portugal) Magali de Lattre (Morocco) Lamia Essaadi	(Belgium) Ineke Mergaert (Russia) Avgusta Tsybysheva (Poland) Klaudia Gawlik (Morocco) Lina Bennani	
July 21, 2008	Rabat, Morocco; Clay $10,000	(Italy) Benedetta Davato (Italy) Lisa Sabino; 6–2 6–1	(Russia) Valeria Savinykh (Ukraine) Yuliana Umanets	(Portugal) Magali de Lattre (Morocco) Lamia Essaadi	(Belgium) Ineke Mergaert (Russia) Avgusta Tsybysheva (Poland) Klaudia Gawlik (Morocco) Lina Bennani	
July 21, 2008	Kharkiv, Ukraine; Clay $25,000	(Ukraine) Khrystyna Antoniichuk; 6–3 4–6 6–1	(Ukraine) Irina Buryachok	(Russia) Varvara Galanina (Russia) Natalia Orlova	(Kyrgyzstan) Ksenia Palkina (Russia) Maya Gaverova (Russia) Ksenia Pervak (Austria) Patricia Mayr	
July 21, 2008	Kharkiv, Ukraine; Clay $25,000	(Romania) Mihaela Buzărnescu (Georgia (country)) Oksana Kalashnikova; 6–1 6–4	(Ukraine) Khrystyna Antoniichuk (Ukraine) Lesia Tsurenko	(Russia) Varvara Galanina (Russia) Natalia Orlova	(Kyrgyzstan) Ksenia Palkina (Russia) Maya Gaverova (Russia) Ksenia Pervak (Austria) Patricia Mayr	
July 21, 2008	A Coruña, Spain; Hard $25,000	(Greece) Anna Gerasimou; 6–2 6–7^{(5)} 6–3	(Portugal) Neuza Silva	(Canada) Heidi El Tabakh (Spain) Sara del Barrio Aragón	(Spain) Paula Fondevila Castro (Spain) Maite Gabarrús-Alonso (Italy) Giulia Gabba (Spain) Irene Rehberger Bescos	
July 21, 2008	A Coruña, Spain; Hard $25,000	(Portugal) Neuza Silva (Netherlands) Nicole Thyssen; 6–2 6–2	(Colombia) Karen Castiblanco Duarte (Colombia) Paula Zabala	(Canada) Heidi El Tabakh (Spain) Sara del Barrio Aragón	(Spain) Paula Fondevila Castro (Spain) Maite Gabarrús-Alonso (Italy) Giulia Gabba (Spain) Irene Rehberger Bescos	
July 21, 2008	Les Contamines, France; Hard $25,000	(Latvia) Anastasija Sevastova; 6–4 3–6 6–3	(Argentina) Agustina Lepore	(Bosnia and Herzegovina) Mervana Jugić-Salkić (France) Florence Haring	(France) Youliya Fedossova (Serbia) Teodora Mirčić (Slovakia) Kristína Kučová (Belgium) Debbrich Feys	
July 21, 2008	Les Contamines, France; Hard $25,000	(Bosnia and Herzegovina) Mervana Jugić-Salkić (Serbia) Teodora Mirčić; 6–1 6–4	(Germany) Justine Ozga (Czech Republic) Darina Šeděnková	(Bosnia and Herzegovina) Mervana Jugić-Salkić (France) Florence Haring	(France) Youliya Fedossova (Serbia) Teodora Mirčić (Slovakia) Kristína Kučová (Belgium) Debbrich Feys	
July 21, 2008	Lexington, Kentucky, United States; Hard $50,000	(United States) Melanie Oudin; 6–4 6–2	(United States) Carly Gullickson	(Chinese Taipei) Chan Chin-wei (South Korea) Lee Ye-ra	(United States) Lindsay Lee-Waters (United States) Story Tweedie-Yates (Japan) Junri Namigata (United Kingdom) Georgie Stoop	
July 21, 2008	Lexington, Kentucky, United States; Hard $50,000	(Chinese Taipei) Chan Chin-wei (United States) Kimberly Couts; 2–6 6–3 [10–8]	(United States) Lindsay Lee-Waters (United States) Melanie Oudin	(Chinese Taipei) Chan Chin-wei (South Korea) Lee Ye-ra	(United States) Lindsay Lee-Waters (United States) Story Tweedie-Yates (Japan) Junri Namigata (United Kingdom) Georgie Stoop	
July 21, 2008	Pétange, Luxembourg; Clay $75,000	(France) Mathilde Johansson; 2–6 7–5 7–5	(Czech Republic) Renata Voráčová	(Russia) Anastasia Pivovarova (Netherlands) Arantxa Rus	(Romania) Ioana Raluca Olaru (Luxembourg) Claudine Schaul (Belarus) Anastasiya Yakimova (Germany) Anne Schäfer	
July 21, 2008	Pétange, Luxembourg; Clay $75,000	(Italy) Corinna Dentoni (Russia) Anastasia Pivovarova; 6–4 6–1	(France) Stéphanie Foretz (Turkey) İpek Şenoğlu	(Russia) Anastasia Pivovarova (Netherlands) Arantxa Rus	(Romania) Ioana Raluca Olaru (Luxembourg) Claudine Schaul (Belarus) Anastasiya Yakimova (Germany) Anne Schäfer	
July 28, 2008	Arad, Romania; Clay $10,000	(Hungary) Palma Kiraly; 6–3 6–2	(Romania) Alexandra Cadanțu	(Romania) Diana Enache (Romania) Andreea Mitu	(Slovakia) Katarína Poljaková (Hungary) Virág Németh (Slovakia) Patrícia Verešová (Romania) Elora Dabija	
July 28, 2008	Arad, Romania; Clay $10,000	(Romania) Laura-Ioana Andrei (Romania) Diana Enache; 3–6 6–2 [10–6]	(Romania) Elora Dabija (Romania) Andreea Mitu	(Romania) Diana Enache (Romania) Andreea Mitu	(Slovakia) Katarína Poljaková (Hungary) Virág Németh (Slovakia) Patrícia Verešová (Romania) Elora Dabija	
July 28, 2008	Gardone Val Trompia, Italy; Clay $10,000	(France) Aurélie Védy; 3–6 6–2 6–1	(Belgium) Appollonia Melzani	(Argentina) Maria Belen Corbalan (Italy) Stefania Chieppa	(Chile) Gabriela Roux (Italy) Lisa Tognetti (Australia) Johanna Konta (Italy) Julia Mayr	
July 28, 2008	Gardone Val Trompia, Italy; Clay $10,000	(Italy) Stefania Chieppa (Argentina) Maria Belen Corbalan; 6–3 6–2	(Canada) Elisabeth Abanda (Canada) Emma Onila	(Argentina) Maria Belen Corbalan (Italy) Stefania Chieppa	(Chile) Gabriela Roux (Italy) Lisa Tognetti (Australia) Johanna Konta (Italy) Julia Mayr	
July 28, 2008	Rabat, Morocco; Clay $10,000	(Morocco) Lamia Essaadi; 7–6^{(4)} 6–2	(Italy) Lisa Sabino	(Morocco) Fatima El Allami (Belgium) Ineke Mergaert	(Spain) Nuria Párrizas Díaz (Italy) Benedetta Davato (Russia) Avgusta Tsybysheva (Italy) Vivienne Vierin	
July 28, 2008	Rabat, Morocco; Clay $10,000	(Morocco) Fatima El Allami (Italy) Lisa Sabino; 6–0 6–3	(Georgia (country)) Sofia Kvatsabaia (Russia) Avgusta Tsybysheva	(Morocco) Fatima El Allami (Belgium) Ineke Mergaert	(Spain) Nuria Párrizas Díaz (Italy) Benedetta Davato (Russia) Avgusta Tsybysheva (Italy) Vivienne Vierin	
July 28, 2008	Saint Joseph, Missouri, United States; Hard $10,000	(United States) Amanda McDowell; 6–1 6–0	(United Kingdom) Emily Webley-Smith	(United States) Alison Riske (Georgia (country)) Sofia Melikishvili	(Slovakia) Zuzana Zemenová (United States) Stacey Tan (United States) Chieh-yu Hsu (United States) Ellah Nze	
July 28, 2008	Saint Joseph, Missouri, United States; Hard $10,000	(United States) Anna Lubinsky (United States) Lauren Lui; 6–2 3–6 [12–10]	(United States) Elizabeth Lumpkin (United States) Marine Nizri Spiegel	(United States) Alison Riske (Georgia (country)) Sofia Melikishvili	(Slovakia) Zuzana Zemenová (United States) Stacey Tan (United States) Chieh-yu Hsu (United States) Ellah Nze	
July 28, 2008	Surakarta, Indonesia; Hard $10,000	(Indonesia) Sandy Gumulya; 6–7^{(5)} 6–1 6–1	(South Korea) Kim Jin-hee	(Malaysia) Jawairiah Noordin (China) Qiu Sisi	(Australia) Cassandra Barr (Vietnam) Thuy-Dung Nguyen (Thailand) Nicha Lertpitaksinchai (China) He Chun-yan	
July 28, 2008	Surakarta, Indonesia; Hard $10,000	(Chinese Taipei) Chen Yi (South Korea) Kim Jin-hee; 6–2 6–4	(Indonesia) Sandy Gumulya (Indonesia) Lavinia Tananta	(Malaysia) Jawairiah Noordin (China) Qiu Sisi	(Australia) Cassandra Barr (Vietnam) Thuy-Dung Nguyen (Thailand) Nicha Lertpitaksinchai (China) He Chun-yan	
July 28, 2008	Tampere, Finland; Clay $10,000	(Slovakia) Martina Balogová; 6–3 2–6 6–0	(Denmark) Hanne Skak Jensen	(Russia) Renata Bakieva (Estonia) Anett Schutting	(Germany) Karolina Nowak (Russia) Daria Mironova (Czech Republic) Eva Pigová (Switzerland) Milica Tomić	
July 28, 2008	Tampere, Finland; Clay $10,000	(Sweden) Diana Eriksson (Denmark) Hanne Skak Jensen; 6–4 6–0	(Sweden) Annie Goransson (Sweden) Caroline Magnusson	(Russia) Renata Bakieva (Estonia) Anett Schutting	(Germany) Karolina Nowak (Russia) Daria Mironova (Czech Republic) Eva Pigová (Switzerland) Milica Tomić	
July 28, 2008	Bad Saulgau, Germany; Clay $25,000	(Czech Republic) Lucie Hradecká; 6–1 4–6 6–4	(Germany) Carmen Klaschka	(Poland) Magdalena Kiszczyńska (Poland) Anna Korzeniak	(Czech Republic) Michaela Paštiková (Slovenia) Maša Zec Peškirič (Czech Republic) Iveta Gerlová (Germany) Dominice Ripoll	
July 28, 2008	Bad Saulgau, Germany; Clay $25,000	(Czech Republic) Simona Dobrá (Czech Republic) Tereza Hladíková; 6–1 4–6 [10–8]	(Italy) Anna Floris (Luxembourg) Claudine Schaul	(Poland) Magdalena Kiszczyńska (Poland) Anna Korzeniak	(Czech Republic) Michaela Paštiková (Slovenia) Maša Zec Peškirič (Czech Republic) Iveta Gerlová (Germany) Dominice Ripoll	
July 28, 2008	Campos do Jordão, Brazil; Hard $25,000	(Argentina) Jorgelina Cravero; 6–3 6–2	(Argentina) Florencia Molinero	(Uruguay) Estefanía Craciún (Brazil) Vivian Segnini	(Brazil) Nathalia Rossi (Bolivia) María Fernanda Álvarez Terán (Argentina) Aranza Salut (Argentina) Verónica Spiegel	
July 28, 2008	Campos do Jordão, Brazil; Hard $25,000	(Argentina) Mailen Auroux (Brazil) Roxane Vaisemberg; 6–3 6–4	(Argentina) Jorgelina Cravero (Argentina) María Irigoyen	(Uruguay) Estefanía Craciún (Brazil) Vivian Segnini	(Brazil) Nathalia Rossi (Bolivia) María Fernanda Álvarez Terán (Argentina) Aranza Salut (Argentina) Verónica Spiegel	
July 28, 2008	Obihiro, Japan; Carpet $25,000	(Japan) Kimiko Date-Krumm; 6–3 7–6^{(5)}	(Thailand) Suchanun Viratprasert	(Japan) Tomoko Yonemura (South Korea) Chang Kyung-mi	(Japan) Mari Tanaka (Japan) Shiho Akita (Japan) Shiho Hisamatsu (Japan) Chiaki Okadaue	
July 28, 2008	Obihiro, Japan; Carpet $25,000	(Japan) Shiko Hisamatsu (Japan) Mari Tanaka; 6–4 6–2	(Japan) Miki Miyamura (Japan) Tamayo Takagishi	(Japan) Tomoko Yonemura (South Korea) Chang Kyung-mi	(Japan) Mari Tanaka (Japan) Shiho Akita (Japan) Shiho Hisamatsu (Japan) Chiaki Okadaue	
July 28, 2008	Vigo, Spain; Hard $25,000	(Portugal) Neuza Silva; 6–3 6–1	(Spain) Sílvia Soler Espinosa	(Romania) Liana Ungur (Portugal) Frederica Piedade	(Australia) Emelyn Starr (France) Youlia Fedossova (Spain) Paula Fondevila Castro (Netherlands) Nicole Thyssen	
July 28, 2008	Vigo, Spain; Hard $25,000	(Portugal) Neuza Silva (Netherlands) Nicole Thyssen; 6–2 6–4	(Russia) Nina Bratchikova (Portugal) Frederica Piedade	(Romania) Liana Ungur (Portugal) Frederica Piedade	(Australia) Emelyn Starr (France) Youlia Fedossova (Spain) Paula Fondevila Castro (Netherlands) Nicole Thyssen	
July 28, 2008	Vancouver, Canada; Hard $50,000	(Poland) Urszula Radwańska; 2–6 6–3 7–5	(France) Julie Coin	(United States) Madison Brengle (United States) Carly Gullickson	(United States) Gail Brodsky (South Korea) Lee Ye-ra (United States) Shenay Perry (Canada) Rebecca Marino	
July 28, 2008	Vancouver, Canada; Hard $50,000	(United States) Carly Gullickson (Australia) Nicole Kriz; 6–7(4) 6–1 [10–5]	(United States) Christina Fusano (Japan) Junri Namigata	(United States) Madison Brengle (United States) Carly Gullickson	(United States) Gail Brodsky (South Korea) Lee Ye-ra (United States) Shenay Perry (Canada) Rebecca Marino	
July 28, 2008	Dnipropetrovsk, Ukraine; Clay $50,000+H	(Austria) Patricia Mayr; 6–3 6–4	(Belarus) Ekaterina Dzehalevich	(Belarus) Anastasiya Yakimova (Russia) Vitalia Diatchenko	(Romania) Mihaela Buzărnescu (Ukraine) Irina Buryachok (Netherlands) Chayenne Ewijk (Czech Republic) Renata Voráčová	
July 28, 2008	Dnipropetrovsk, Ukraine; Clay $50,000+H	(Russia) Vasilisa Davydova (Russia) Maria Kondratieva; 6–3 6–1	(Ukraine) Lyudmyla Kichenok (Ukraine) Nadiia Kichenok	(Belarus) Anastasiya Yakimova (Russia) Vitalia Diatchenko	(Romania) Mihaela Buzărnescu (Ukraine) Irina Buryachok (Netherlands) Chayenne Ewijk (Czech Republic) Renata Voráčová	
July 28, 2008	Rimini, Italy; Clay $75,000	(Germany) Anna-Lena Grönefeld; 6–3 6–4	(Spain) Lourdes Domínguez Lino	(Belgium) Kirsten Flipkens (Italy) Roberta Vinci	(Switzerland) Stefanie Vögele (Italy) Mara Santangelo (Germany) Kathrin Wörle (Estonia) Maret Ani	
July 28, 2008	Rimini, Italy; Clay $75,000	(Italy) Mara Santangelo (Italy) Roberta Vinci; 6–1 6–4	(Switzerland) Stefanie Vögele (Germany) Kathrin Wörle	(Belgium) Kirsten Flipkens (Italy) Roberta Vinci	(Switzerland) Stefanie Vögele (Italy) Mara Santangelo (Germany) Kathrin Wörle (Estonia) Maret Ani	

=== August ===
Week	Tournament	Winner	Runner-up	Semi finalists	Quarter finalists	Refs
August 4, 2008	(Indonesia) Jakarta, Indonesia; Hard $10,000	(Indonesia) Beatrice Gumulya; 6–1 3–6 6–2	(Indonesia) Sandy Gumulya	(China) He Chun-Yan (Indonesia) Lutfiana-Aris Budiharto	(South Korea) Kim Jin-hee (Indonesia) Grace Sari Ysidora (Vietnam) Thuy-Dung Nguyen (Australia) Cassandra Barr	
August 4, 2008	(Indonesia) Jakarta, Indonesia; Hard $10,000	(Indonesia) Liza Andriyani (Indonesia) Angelique Widjaja; 6–3 6–1	(Chinese Taipei) Chen Yi (South Korea) Kim Jin-hee	(China) He Chun-Yan (Indonesia) Lutfiana-Aris Budiharto	(South Korea) Kim Jin-hee (Indonesia) Grace Sari Ysidora (Vietnam) Thuy-Dung Nguyen (Australia) Cassandra Barr	
August 4, 2008	(Belgium) Rebecq, Belgium; Clay $10,000	(Poland) Aleksandra Grela; 6–1 7–5	(Netherlands) Marlot Meddens	(France) Gracia Radovanovic (Belgium) Sofie Oyen	(Germany) Hermon Brhane (United Kingdom) Katharina Brown (France) Émilie Bacquet (Netherlands) Marcella Koek	
August 4, 2008	(Belgium) Rebecq, Belgium; Clay $10,000	(Poland) Aleksandra Grela (Belgium) Sofie Oyen; 6–3 6–2	(France) Émilie Bacquet (Netherlands) Marcella Koek	(France) Gracia Radovanovic (Belgium) Sofie Oyen	(Germany) Hermon Brhane (United Kingdom) Katharina Brown (France) Émilie Bacquet (Netherlands) Marcella Koek	
August 4, 2008	(Finland) Savitaipale, Finland; Clay $10,000	(Slovakia) Martina Balogová; 6–2 6–2	(Denmark) Hanne Skak Jensen	(Russia) Diana Arutyunova (Russia) Renata Bakieva	(Italy) Vivienne Vierin (Estonia) Julia Matojan (Belgium) Davinia Lobbinger (Finland) Katariina Tuohimaa	
August 4, 2008	(Finland) Savitaipale, Finland; Clay $10,000	(Denmark) Hanne Skak Jensen (Belgium) Davinia Lobbinger; 6–1 6–3	(Latvia) Diāna Marcinkēviča (Russia) Ekaterina Prozorova	(Russia) Diana Arutyunova (Russia) Renata Bakieva	(Italy) Vivienne Vierin (Estonia) Julia Matojan (Belgium) Davinia Lobbinger (Finland) Katariina Tuohimaa	
August 4, 2008	(Austria) Vienna, Austria; Clay $10,000	(Austria) Nikola Hofmanova; 6–3 6–1	(Slovakia) Nikola Vajdová	(Austria) Iris Khanna (Slovakia) Karin Morgošová	(Romania) Ana Bogdan (Slovenia) Tina Obrež (Italy) Agnese Zucchini (Germany) Katharina Jobst	
August 4, 2008	(Austria) Vienna, Austria; Clay $10,000	(Slovakia) udmilaC ervanová (Slovakia) Katarína Maráčková; 0–6 6–3 [13–11]	(Romania) Laura-Ioana Andrei (Austria) Nikola Hofmanova	(Austria) Iris Khanna (Slovakia) Karin Morgošová	(Romania) Ana Bogdan (Slovenia) Tina Obrež (Italy) Agnese Zucchini (Germany) Katharina Jobst	
August 4, 2008	(Portugal) Coimbra, Portugal; Hard $25,000	(Netherlands) Nicole Thyssen; 6–4 6–4	(United Kingdom) Georgie Stoop	(France) Irena Pavlovic (Portugal) Frederica Piedade	(Bulgaria) Elitsa Kostova (Romania) Liana Ungur (Poland) Olga Brózda (Spain) Estrella Cabeza Candela	
August 4, 2008	(Portugal) Coimbra, Portugal; Hard $25,000	(Spain) Paula Fondevila Castro (Spain) Lucía Sainz; 7–6^{(2)} 6–0	(Slovakia) Martina Babáková (Poland) Olga Brózda	(France) Irena Pavlovic (Portugal) Frederica Piedade	(Bulgaria) Elitsa Kostova (Romania) Liana Ungur (Poland) Olga Brózda (Spain) Estrella Cabeza Candela	
August 4, 2008	(Germany) Hechingen, Germany; Clay $25,000	(Slovenia) Maša Zec Peškirič; 3–6 7–6^{(1)} 6–3	(Slovakia) Kristína Kučová	(Czech Republic) Lucie Hradecká (Poland) Anna Korzeniak	(Spain) Eloisa Compostizo de Andrés (Czech Republic) Sandra Záhlavová (Ukraine) Yuliya Beygelzimer (Netherlands) Daniëlle Harmsen	
August 4, 2008	(Germany) Hechingen, Germany; Clay $25,000	(Indonesia) Yayuk Basuki (Indonesia) Romana Tedjakusuma; 2–6 6–2 [10–6]	(Croatia) Darija Jurak (Germany) Carmen Klaschka	(Czech Republic) Lucie Hradecká (Poland) Anna Korzeniak	(Spain) Eloisa Compostizo de Andrés (Czech Republic) Sandra Záhlavová (Ukraine) Yuliya Beygelzimer (Netherlands) Daniëlle Harmsen	
August 4, 2008	(Italy) Monteroni d'Arbia, Italy; Clay $25,000	(Italy) Nathalie Viérin; 6–1 2–6 7–6^{(5)}	(Luxembourg) Mandy Minella	(Italy) Elisa Balsamo (Bosnia and Herzegovina) Mervana Jugić-Salkić	(Italy) Giulia Gatto-Monticone (Italy) Anna Floris (Italy) Elena Pioppo (France) Aurélie Védy	
August 4, 2008	(Italy) Monteroni d'Arbia, Italy; Clay $25,000	(Bosnia and Herzegovina) Mervana Jugić-Salkić (France) Aurélie Védy; 6–4 6–2	(Italy) Valentina Sulpizio (Italy) Verdiana Verardi	(Italy) Elisa Balsamo (Bosnia and Herzegovina) Mervana Jugić-Salkić	(Italy) Giulia Gatto-Monticone (Italy) Anna Floris (Italy) Elena Pioppo (France) Aurélie Védy	
August 4, 2008	(Russia) Moscow, Russia; Clay $75,000	(Russia) Anna Lapushchenkova; 5–1 ret.	(Hungary) Anikó Kapros	(Russia) Anastasia Rodionova (Austria) Melanie Klaffner	(Russia) Vitalia Diatchenko (Russia) Maria Kondratieva (Ukraine) Khrystyna Antoniichuk (Austria) Patricia Mayr	
August 4, 2008	(Russia) Moscow, Russia; Clay $75,000	(Russia) Vitalia Diatchenko (Russia) Maria Kondratieva; 6–0 6–4	(Ukraine) Veronika Kapshay (Latvia) Irina Kuzmina	(Russia) Anastasia Rodionova (Austria) Melanie Klaffner	(Russia) Vitalia Diatchenko (Russia) Maria Kondratieva (Ukraine) Khrystyna Antoniichuk (Austria) Patricia Mayr	
August 4, 2008	(Mexico) Monterrey, Mexico; Hard $100,000+H	(Russia) Yaroslava Shvedova; 6–4 6–1	(Slovakia) Magdaléna Rybáriková	(Belgium) Yanina Wickmayer (Germany) Kristina Barrois	(United States) Angela Haynes (United States) Vania King (Japan) Rika Fujiwara (Colombia) Mariana Duque	
August 4, 2008	(Mexico) Monterrey, Mexico; Hard $100,000+H	(Croatia) Jelena Pandžić (Slovakia) Magdaléna Rybáriková; 4–6 6–4 [10–8]	(Australia) Monique Adamczak (United Kingdom) Melanie South	(Belgium) Yanina Wickmayer (Germany) Kristina Barrois	(United States) Angela Haynes (United States) Vania King (Japan) Rika Fujiwara (Colombia) Mariana Duque	
August 11, 2008	(Thailand) Chiang Mei, Thailand; Hard $10,000	(Thailand) Noppawan Lertcheewakarn; 6–2 6–3	(Thailand) Nungnadda Wannasuk	(Chinese Taipei) Chen Yi (China) Lu Jia-Jing	(South Korea) Kang Seo-kyung (India) Rushmi Chakravarthi (Thailand) Khunpak Issara (China) Chen Yanchong	
August 11, 2008	(Thailand) Chiang Mei, Thailand; Hard $10,000	(China) Chen Yanchong (Chinese Taipei) Chen Yi; 7–5 6–3	(Thailand) Sophia Mulsap (Thailand) Varatchaya Wongteanchai	(Chinese Taipei) Chen Yi (China) Lu Jia-Jing	(South Korea) Kang Seo-kyung (India) Rushmi Chakravarthi (Thailand) Khunpak Issara (China) Chen Yanchong	
August 11, 2008	(Poland) Iława, Poland; Clay $10,000	(Slovakia) Romana Tabak; 6–3 4–6 6–1	(Poland) Aleksandra Rosolska	(Belarus) Ima Bohush (Armenia) Anna Movsisyan	(Czech Republic) Barbora Vykydalová (Germany) Karolina Nowak (Slovakia) Patrícia Verešová (United Kingdom) Katharina Brown	
August 11, 2008	(Poland) Iława, Poland; Clay $10,000	(Belarus) Ima Bohush (Slovakia) Romana Tabak; 6–3 6–2	(South Africa) Lisa Marshall (Armenia) Anna Movsisyan	(Belarus) Ima Bohush (Armenia) Anna Movsisyan	(Czech Republic) Barbora Vykydalová (Germany) Karolina Nowak (Slovakia) Patrícia Verešová (United Kingdom) Katharina Brown	
August 11, 2008	(Belgium) Koksijde, Belgium; Clay $10,000	(Luxembourg) Claudine Schaul; 7–6^{(2)} 7–6^{(7)}	(Netherlands) Daniëlle Harmsen	(Poland) Aleksandra Grela (France) Kinnie Laisné	(Belgium) Caroline Maes (Belgium) Sofie Oyen (Belgium) Soetkin Van Deun (Spain) Sandra Soler Sola	
August 11, 2008	(Belgium) Koksijde, Belgium; Clay $10,000	(Morocco) Fatima El Allami (Australia) Hayley Ericksen; 4–6 6–3 [10–7]	(Netherlands) Josanne Van Bennekom (France) Nadege Vergos	(Poland) Aleksandra Grela (France) Kinnie Laisné	(Belgium) Caroline Maes (Belgium) Sofie Oyen (Belgium) Soetkin Van Deun (Spain) Sandra Soler Sola	
August 11, 2008	(United Kingdom) London, England; Hard $10,000	(United Kingdom) Anna Smith; 6–3 3–6 7–5	(Canada) Rebecca Marino	(Slovakia) Martina Babáková (Switzerland) Stefania Boffa	(United Kingdom) Natasha Khan (Australia) Tyra Calderwood (United Kingdom) Naomi Broady (Germany) Mona Barthel	
August 11, 2008	(United Kingdom) London, England; Hard $10,000	(United States) Megan Moulton-Levy (United Kingdom) Emily Webley-Smith; 6–1 6–1	(Slovakia) Martina Babáková (Georgia (country)) Manana Shapakidze	(Slovakia) Martina Babáková (Switzerland) Stefania Boffa	(United Kingdom) Natasha Khan (Australia) Tyra Calderwood (United Kingdom) Naomi Broady (Germany) Mona Barthel	
August 11, 2008	(Italy) Pesaro, Italy; Clay $10,000	(Italy) Alice Moroni; 6–1 3–6 6–3	(Italy) Lisa Sabino	(Italy) Martina Trevisan (Czech Republic) Kristýna Plíšková	(Italy) Silvia Disderi (Italy) Valentine Confalonieri (Italy) Agnese Zucchini (Italy) Gabriela Polito	
August 11, 2008	(Italy) Pesaro, Italy; Clay $10,000	(Italy) Benedetta Davato (Italy) Lisa Sabino; 6–2 7–6^{(5)}	(Italy) Stefania Chieppa (Italy) Giulia Gatto-Monticone	(Italy) Martina Trevisan (Czech Republic) Kristýna Plíšková	(Italy) Silvia Disderi (Italy) Valentine Confalonieri (Italy) Agnese Zucchini (Italy) Gabriela Polito	
August 11, 2008	(Germany) Versmold, Germany; Clay $10,000	(Italy) Evelyn Mayr; 5–7 6–4 6–3	(Indonesia) Romana Tedjakusuma	(Germany) Laura Haberkorn (Netherlands) Bibiane Schoofs	(France) Samantha Schoeffel (Germany) Syna Kayser (Germany) Nicola Geuer (Czech Republic) Pavla Šmídová	
August 11, 2008	(Germany) Versmold, Germany; Clay $10,000	(France) Samantha Schoeffel (Netherlands) Bibiane Schoofs; 4–6 7–6^{(5)} [10–5]	(Germany) Nicola Geuer (Germany) Laura Haberkorn	(Germany) Laura Haberkorn (Netherlands) Bibiane Schoofs	(France) Samantha Schoeffel (Germany) Syna Kayser (Germany) Nicola Geuer (Czech Republic) Pavla Šmídová	
August 11, 2008	(United States) The Bronx, New York, USA; Hard $50,000	(Russia) Elena Bovina; 6–3 7–5	(Germany) Anna-Lena Grönefeld	(South Africa) Chanelle Scheepers (Switzerland) Stefanie Vögele	(Austria) Yvonne Meusburger (Russia) Ekaterina Ivanova (Estonia) Margit Rüütel (Germany) Kristina Barrois	
August 11, 2008	(United States) The Bronx, New York, USA; Hard $50,000	(United States) Raquel Kops-Jones (United States) Abigail Spears; 6–4 6–3	(United States) Angela Haynes (United States) Ahsha Rolle	(South Africa) Chanelle Scheepers (Switzerland) Stefanie Vögele	(Austria) Yvonne Meusburger (Russia) Ekaterina Ivanova (Estonia) Margit Rüütel (Germany) Kristina Barrois	
August 11, 2008	(Serbia) Palić, Serbia; Clay $50,000	(Slovakia) Lenka Wienerová; 7–5 7–6^{(6)}	(Hungary) Katalin Marosi	(Slovakia) Lenka Tvarošková (Bosnia and Herzegovina) Mervana Jugić-Salkić	(Czech Republic) Tereza Hladíková (Poland) Olga Brózda (Romania) Alexandra Dulgheru (Serbia) Ana Jovanović	
August 11, 2008	(Serbia) Palić, Serbia; Clay $50,000	(Poland) Olga Brózda (Poland) Magdalena Kiszczyńska; 6–3 7–6^{(5)}	(Bosnia and Herzegovina) Mervana Jugić-Salkić (Serbia) Teodora Mirčić	(Slovakia) Lenka Tvarošková (Bosnia and Herzegovina) Mervana Jugić-Salkić	(Czech Republic) Tereza Hladíková (Poland) Olga Brózda (Romania) Alexandra Dulgheru (Serbia) Ana Jovanović	
August 11, 2008	(Russia) Penza, Russia; Clay $50,000	(Russia) Ksenia Pervak; 6–4 6–1	(Georgia (country)) Sofia Shapatava	(Russia) Maria Mokh (Israel) Julia Glushko	(Russia) Varvara Galanina (Russia) Vitalia Diatchenko (Russia) Nadejda Guskova (Turkey) Çağla Büyükakçay	
August 11, 2008	(Russia) Penza, Russia; Clay $50,000	(Kyrgyzstan) Ksenia Palkina (Georgia (country)) Sofia Shapatava; 6–4 6–4	(Ukraine) Irina Buryachok (Czech Republic) Nikola Fraňková	(Russia) Maria Mokh (Israel) Julia Glushko	(Russia) Varvara Galanina (Russia) Vitalia Diatchenko (Russia) Nadejda Guskova (Turkey) Çağla Büyükakçay	
August 18, 2008	(Argentina) Bell Ville, Argentina; Clay $10,000	(Argentina) Verónica Spiegel; 6–1 6–1	(Chile) Cecilia Costa	(Argentina) Luciana Sarmenti (Argentina) Tatiana Búa	(Argentina) Emilia Yorio (Chile) Gabriela Roux (Brazil) Paula Cristina Gonçalves (Argentina) Aranza Salut	
August 18, 2008	(Argentina) Bell Ville, Argentina; Clay $10,000	(Argentina) Carla Beltrami (Argentina) Tatiana Búa; Walkover	(Argentina) Vanesa Furlanetto (Argentina) Aranza Salut	(Argentina) Luciana Sarmenti (Argentina) Tatiana Búa	(Argentina) Emilia Yorio (Chile) Gabriela Roux (Brazil) Paula Cristina Gonçalves (Argentina) Aranza Salut	
August 18, 2008	(Netherlands) Enschede, Netherlands; Clay $10,000	(Netherlands) Marlot Meddens; 7–5 6–3	(Spain) Sandra Soler Sola	(Netherlands) Chayenne Ewijk (Netherlands) Kiki Bertens	(Germany) Franzisca Etzel (Netherlands) Nicolette van Uitert (Netherlands) Lesley Kerkhove (Germany) Carolin Daniels	
August 18, 2008	(Netherlands) Enschede, Netherlands; Clay $10,000	(Netherlands) Chayenne Ewijk (Netherlands) Pauline Wong; 6–1 6–4	(Canada) Daniela Covello (Netherlands) Bo Verhulsdonk	(Netherlands) Chayenne Ewijk (Netherlands) Kiki Bertens	(Germany) Franzisca Etzel (Netherlands) Nicolette van Uitert (Netherlands) Lesley Kerkhove (Germany) Carolin Daniels	
August 18, 2008	(South Korea) Gimhae, South Korea; Hard $10,000	(South Korea) Chang Kyung-mi; 6–4 6–2	(South Korea) Kim Sun-jung	(South Korea) Kim Na-ri (South Korea) Kim So-jung	(South Korea) Cho Eun-hye (South Korea) Yu Min-hwa (South Korea) Hwang Eun-jeong (South Korea) Kim Hae-sung	
August 18, 2008	(South Korea) Gimhae, South Korea; Hard $10,000	(South Korea) Kim So-jung (Japan) Ayaka Maekawa; 2–6 6–3 [10–4]	(South Korea) Cho Jeong-a (South Korea) Kim Ji-young	(South Korea) Kim Na-ri (South Korea) Kim So-jung	(South Korea) Cho Eun-hye (South Korea) Yu Min-hwa (South Korea) Hwang Eun-jeong (South Korea) Kim Hae-sung	
August 18, 2008	(Poland) Kędzierzyn-Koźle, Poland; Clay $10,000	(Czech Republic) Simona Dobrá; 6–7^{(4)} 6–0 7–5	(Slovakia) Nikola Vajdová	(Czech Republic) Iveta Gerlová (Czech Republic) Kateřina Kramperová	(Poland) Katarzyna Kawa (Czech Republic) Pavla Šmídová (Belarus) Ima Bohush (Poland) Klaudia Gawlik	
August 18, 2008	(Poland) Kędzierzyn-Koźle, Poland; Clay $10,000	(Czech Republic) Simona Dobrá (Czech Republic) Iveta Gerlová; 4–6 6–0 [10–6]	(South Africa) Lisa Marshall (Ukraine) Yelyzaveta Rybakova	(Czech Republic) Iveta Gerlová (Czech Republic) Kateřina Kramperová	(Poland) Katarzyna Kawa (Czech Republic) Pavla Šmídová (Belarus) Ima Bohush (Poland) Klaudia Gawlik	
August 18, 2008	(Thailand) Khonkan, Thailand; Hard $10,000	(China) Lu Jia-Jing; 6–3 6–4	(Hong Kong) Chan Wing-yau	(China) Lu Jia Xiang (China) Chen Yanchong	(New Zealand) Katherine Westbury (South Korea) Kang Seo-kyung (Thailand) Sophia Mulsap (Chinese Taipei) Chen Yi	
August 18, 2008	(Thailand) Khonkan, Thailand; Hard $10,000	(India) Ankita Bhambri (India) Sanaa Bhambri; 7–5 7–6^{(6)}	(Thailand) Kanyapat Narattana (Thailand) Nungnadda Wannasuk	(China) Lu Jia Xiang (China) Chen Yanchong	(New Zealand) Katherine Westbury (South Korea) Kang Seo-kyung (Thailand) Sophia Mulsap (Chinese Taipei) Chen Yi	
August 18, 2008	(Italy) Tre Castagni, Italy; Hard $10,000	(Canada) Rebecca Marino; 6–2 6–2	(Italy) Alice Moroni	(Czech Republic) Kristýna Plíšková (Italy) Sara Savarice	(Turkey) Pemra Özgen (Romania) Alexandra Damaschin (Italy) Carmen Pinto (Israel) Ester Masuri	
August 18, 2008	(Italy) Tre Castagni, Italy; Hard $10,000	(Australia) Emily Hewson (Turkey) Pemra Özgen; Walkover	(Italy) Valeria Casillo (Italy) Lilly Raffa	(Czech Republic) Kristýna Plíšková (Italy) Sara Savarice	(Turkey) Pemra Özgen (Romania) Alexandra Damaschin (Italy) Carmen Pinto (Israel) Ester Masuri	
August 18, 2008	(Croatia) Vinkovci, Croatia; Clay $10,000	(Serbia) Bojana Jovanovski; 6–1 6–3	(Serbia) Zorica Petrov	(Croatia) Matea Mezak (Slovakia) Patrícia Verešová	(Italy) Elisa Balsamo (Germany) Kristina Steiert (Slovakia) Lucia Vršková (Slovenia) Jasmina Kajtazovič	
August 18, 2008	(Croatia) Vinkovci, Croatia; Clay $10,000	(Slovakia) Katerina Poljaková (Slovakia) Zuzana Zlochová; 6–4 7–5	(Slovakia) Eva Fislová (Slovakia) Andrea Rebrová	(Croatia) Matea Mezak (Slovakia) Patrícia Verešová	(Italy) Elisa Balsamo (Germany) Kristina Steiert (Slovakia) Lucia Vršková (Slovenia) Jasmina Kajtazovič	
August 18, 2008	(Germany) Wahlstedt, Germany; Clay $10,000	(Italy) Romina Oprandi; 6–3 6–0	(Italy) Giulia Gatto-Monticone	(Germany) Lydia Steinbach (Czech Republic) Kateřina Vaňková	(Germany) Dominice Ripoll (Switzerland) Nicole Riner (Australia) Alenka Hubacek (Germany) Mona Barthel	
August 18, 2008	(Germany) Wahlstedt, Germany; Clay $10,000	(Germany) Julia Paetow (Germany) Lydia Steinbach; 6–4 6–4	(Germany) Domenice Ripoll (Spain) Lucía Sainz	(Germany) Lydia Steinbach (Czech Republic) Kateřina Vaňková	(Germany) Dominice Ripoll (Switzerland) Nicole Riner (Australia) Alenka Hubacek (Germany) Mona Barthel	
August 18, 2008	(Russia) Moscow, Russia; Clay $25,000	(Russia) Ksenia Pervak; 3–6 6–3 6–1	(Russia) Elena Kulikova	(Russia) Vitalia Diatchenko (Russia) Yuliya Kalabina	(Russia) Varvara Galanina (Russia) Margarita Edinarova (Latvia) Irina Kuzmina (Russia) Nadejda Guskova	
August 18, 2008	(Russia) Moscow, Russia; Clay $25,000	(Russia) Vitalia Diatchenko (Russia) Eugeniya Pashkova; 6–0 6–1	(Slovenia) Tadeja Majerič (Russia) Natalia Ryzhonkova	(Russia) Vitalia Diatchenko (Russia) Yuliya Kalabina	(Russia) Varvara Galanina (Russia) Margarita Edinarova (Latvia) Irina Kuzmina (Russia) Nadejda Guskova	
August 18, 2008	(Belgium) Westende, Belgium; Hard $25,000	(Germany) Carmen Klaschka; 4–6 6–4 6–4	(France) Florence Haring	(Slovakia) Martina Balogová (France) Claire Feuerstein	(United Kingdom) Georgie Stoop (Belgium) Davinia Lobbinger (Argentina) Florencia Molinero (Spain) Rebeca Bou Nogueiro	
August 18, 2008	(Belgium) Westende, Belgium; Hard $25,000	(Belgium) Debbrich Feys (Finland) Emma Laine; 7–5 7–5	(Spain) Rebecca Bou Nogueiro (Russia) Julia Parasyuk	(Slovakia) Martina Balogová (France) Claire Feuerstein	(United Kingdom) Georgie Stoop (Belgium) Davinia Lobbinger (Argentina) Florencia Molinero (Spain) Rebeca Bou Nogueiro	
August 25, 2008	(Romania) Bucharest, Romania; Clay $10,000	(Switzerland) Conny Perrin; 6–3 6–2	(Romania) Diana Enache	(Romania) Alexandra Cadanțu (Romania) Laura-Ioana Andrei	(Romania) Cristina Bianca Danaila (Romania) Diana Gae (Bulgaria) Dalia Zafirova (Romania) Irina-Camelia Begu	
August 25, 2008	(Romania) Bucharest, Romania; Clay $10,000	(Romania) Laura-Ioana Andrei (Romania) Irina-Camelia Begu; 6–2 3–6 [10–6]	(Ukraine) Lyudmyla Kichenok (Ukraine) Nadiia Kichenok	(Romania) Alexandra Cadanțu (Romania) Laura-Ioana Andrei	(Romania) Cristina Bianca Danaila (Romania) Diana Gae (Bulgaria) Dalia Zafirova (Romania) Irina-Camelia Begu	
August 25, 2008	(Argentina) Buenos Aires, Argentina; Clay $10,000	(Argentina) Verónica Spiegel; 6–4 6–0	(Argentina) Vanesa Furlanetto	(Argentina) Carla Beltrami (Argentina) María Irigoyen	(Argentina) Agustina Lepore (Argentina) Luciana Sarmenti (Argentina) Tatiana Búa (Venezuela) Marina Giral Lores	
August 25, 2008	(Argentina) Buenos Aires, Argentina; Clay $10,000	(Argentina) Tatiana Búa (Brazil) Roxane Vaisemberg; 4–6 7–5 [10–3]	(Uruguay) Estefanía Craciún (Argentina) Verónica Spiegel	(Argentina) Carla Beltrami (Argentina) María Irigoyen	(Argentina) Agustina Lepore (Argentina) Luciana Sarmenti (Argentina) Tatiana Búa (Venezuela) Marina Giral Lores	
August 25, 2008	(South Korea) Gimhae, South Korea; Hard $10,000	(South Korea) Lee Jin-a; 6–4 6–1	(South Korea) Chae Kyung-yee	(Japan) Ayaka Maekawa (South Korea) Chang Kyung-mi	(South Korea) Ham Mi-rae (South Korea) Cho Jeong-a (China) Li Ting (Japan) Sakiko Shimizu	
August 25, 2008	(South Korea) Gimhae, South Korea; Hard $10,000	(South Korea) Hong Da-jung (South Korea) Kim Jin-hee; 6–4 6–2	(South Korea) Kim Sun-jung (South Korea) Lee Cho-won	(Japan) Ayaka Maekawa (South Korea) Chang Kyung-mi	(South Korea) Ham Mi-rae (South Korea) Cho Jeong-a (China) Li Ting (Japan) Sakiko Shimizu	
August 25, 2008	(Tunisia) La Marsa, Tunisia; Clay $10,000	(Morocco) Fatima El Allami; 7–6^{(0)} 6–2	(Belgium) Davinia Lobbinger	(Slovakia) Lucia Vršková (Slovenia) Petra Pajalič	(Oman) Fatma Al-Nabhani (Greece) Stamatia Fafaliou (Slovenia) Mika Urbančič (Germany) Jasmin Steinherr	
August 25, 2008	(Tunisia) La Marsa, Tunisia; Clay $10,000	(Morocco) Lina Bennani (Morocco) Fatima El Allami; 4–6 6–4 [11–9]	(Belgium) Davinia Lobbinger (Slovenia) Mika Urbančič	(Slovakia) Lucia Vršková (Slovenia) Petra Pajalič	(Oman) Fatma Al-Nabhani (Greece) Stamatia Fafaliou (Slovenia) Mika Urbančič (Germany) Jasmin Steinherr	
August 25, 2008	(Spain) Mollerusa, Spain; Hard $10,000	(Spain) Sandra Soler Sola; 6–4 6–2	(Spain) Rebeca Bou Nogueiro	(Switzerland) Sarah Moundir (United Kingdom) Amanda Carreras	(Spain) Rocio Lopez Alberca (Russia) Diana Arutyunova (Russia) Julia Parasyuk (Spain) Yera Campos Molina	
August 25, 2008	(Spain) Mollerusa, Spain; Hard $10,000	(Spain) Rebecca Bou Nogueiro (Russia) Julia Parasyuk; 6–7(2) 6–0 [10–5]	(United Kingdom) Yasmin Clarke (United Kingdom) Olivia Scarfi	(Switzerland) Sarah Moundir (United Kingdom) Amanda Carreras	(Spain) Rocio Lopez Alberca (Russia) Diana Arutyunova (Russia) Julia Parasyuk (Spain) Yera Campos Molina	
August 25, 2008	(Thailand) Nothaburi, Thailand; Hard $10,000	(China) Lu Jia-Jing; 6–3 6–4	(China) Yang Yi	(Thailand) Sophia Mulsap (India) Sanaa Bhambri	(South Korea) Jeong Yoon-young (Indonesia) Lavinia Tananta (Australia) Stephanie Wiltshire (Czech Republic) Petra Padaliková	
August 25, 2008	(Thailand) Nothaburi, Thailand; Hard $10,000	(Japan) Tomoko Dokei (Thailand) Suchanun Viratprasert; 6–4 6–2	(China) Guo Zhi-xian (China) Yang Yi	(Thailand) Sophia Mulsap (India) Sanaa Bhambri	(South Korea) Jeong Yoon-young (Indonesia) Lavinia Tananta (Australia) Stephanie Wiltshire (Czech Republic) Petra Padaliková	
August 25, 2008	(Austria) Pörtschach, Austria; Clay $10,000	(Switzerland) Nicole Riner; 6–2 6–4	(Austria) Iris Khanna	(Italy) Annalisa Bona (Italy) Nicole Clerico	(Italy) Alexia Virgili (Sweden) Kristina Andlovic (Austria) Lisa Summerer (Italy) Evelyn Mayr	
August 25, 2008	(Austria) Pörtschach, Austria; Clay $10,000	(Austria) Barbara Hellwig (Austria) Sandra Klemenschits; 2–6 6–2 [10–7]	(Slovenia) Dalila Jakupović (Ukraine) Sofiya Kovalets	(Italy) Annalisa Bona (Italy) Nicole Clerico	(Italy) Alexia Virgili (Sweden) Kristina Andlovic (Austria) Lisa Summerer (Italy) Evelyn Mayr	
August 25, 2008	(Czech Republic) Prague, Czech Republic; Clay $10,000	(Czech Republic) Lucie Kriegsmannová; 7–5 6–2	(Czech Republic) Kateřina Kramperová	(Ukraine) Mariya Malkhasyan (Italy) Raffaella Bindi	(Czech Republic) Kateřina Vaňková (Czech Republic) Klára Kopřivová (Czech Republic) Martina Borecká (Italy) Erika Zanchetta	
August 25, 2008	(Czech Republic) Prague, Czech Republic; Clay $10,000	(Czech Republic) Hana Birnerová (Czech Republic) Lucie Kriegsmannová; 6–2 6–7^{(2)} [10–7]	(Czech Republic) Barbora Krtičková (Czech Republic) Lucie Šípková	(Ukraine) Mariya Malkhasyan (Italy) Raffaella Bindi	(Czech Republic) Kateřina Vaňková (Czech Republic) Klára Kopřivová (Czech Republic) Martina Borecká (Italy) Erika Zanchetta	
August 25, 2008	(Japan) Saitama, Japan; Hard $10,000	(Japan) Sachie Ishizu; 6–2 6–2	(Chinese Taipei) Hwang I-hsuan	(Chinese Taipei) Hsu Wen-hsin (Japan) Anastasia Malhotra	(Japan) Shiho Akita (China) Huang Lei (Japan) Yuko Kurata (United Kingdom) Jade Curtis	
August 25, 2008	(Japan) Saitama, Japan; Hard $10,000	(Chinese Taipei) Hsu Wen-Hsin (Chinese Taipei) Hwang I-hsuan; 6–4 6–3	(Japan) Airi Hagimoto (Japan) Maiko Inoue	(Chinese Taipei) Hsu Wen-hsin (Japan) Anastasia Malhotra	(Japan) Shiho Akita (China) Huang Lei (Japan) Yuko Kurata (United Kingdom) Jade Curtis	
August 25, 2008	(Poland) Katowice, Poland; Clay $25,000	(Slovakia) Lenka Wienerová; 6–3 6–2	(Latvia) Anastasija Sevastova	(Czech Republic) Michaela Paštiková (Lithuania) Lina Stančiūtė	(Australia) Jelena Dokić (Slovakia) Lenka Juríková (Poland) Olga Brózda (Poland) Anna Korzeniak	
August 25, 2008	(Poland) Katowice, Poland; Clay $25,000	(Latvia) Anastasija Sevastova (Slovakia) Lenka Wienerová; 5–7 6–3 [10–3]	(Poland) Karolina Kosińska (Poland) Aleksandra Rosolska	(Czech Republic) Michaela Paštiková (Lithuania) Lina Stančiūtė	(Australia) Jelena Dokić (Slovakia) Lenka Juríková (Poland) Olga Brózda (Poland) Anna Korzeniak	
August 25, 2008	(Netherlands) Vlaardingen, Netherlands; Clay $25,000	(Bosnia and Herzegovina) Mervana Jugić-Salkić; 6–7^{(5)} 7–6^{(5)} 7–5	(Italy) Giulia Gabba	(Canada) Sharon Fichman (Canada) Marie-Ève Pelletier	(Czech Republic) Veronika Chvojková (Germany) Carmen Klaschka (Netherlands) Nicolette van Uitert (Italy) Verdiana Verardi	
August 25, 2008	(Netherlands) Vlaardingen, Netherlands; Clay $25,000	(Bosnia and Herzegovina) Mervana Jugić-Salkić (Serbia) Teodora Mirčić; 6–1 6–4	(Latvia) Irina Kuzmina (Russia) Anastasia Poltoratskaya	(Canada) Sharon Fichman (Canada) Marie-Ève Pelletier	(Czech Republic) Veronika Chvojková (Germany) Carmen Klaschka (Netherlands) Nicolette van Uitert (Italy) Verdiana Verardi	

=== September ===
Week	Tournament	Winner	Runner-up	Semi finalists	Quarter finalists	Refs
September 1, 2008	(Brazil) Barueri, Brazil; Hard $10,000	(Brazil) Maria Fernanda Alves; 6–3 7–5	(Brazil) Carla Tiene	(Brazil) Natalia Guitler (Brazil) Ana Clara Duarte	(Brazil) Fernanda Faria (Brazil) Fernanda Hermenegildo (Brazil) Natalia Cheng (Brazil) Natasha Lotuffo	
September 1, 2008	(Brazil) Barueri, Brazil; Hard $10,000	(Brazil) Maria Fernanda Alves (Brazil) Carla Tiene; 6–2 6–3	(Brazil) Ana Clara Duarte (Brazil) Fernanda Hermenegildo	(Brazil) Natalia Guitler (Brazil) Ana Clara Duarte	(Brazil) Fernanda Faria (Brazil) Fernanda Hermenegildo (Brazil) Natalia Cheng (Brazil) Natasha Lotuffo	
September 1, 2008	(Romania) Brașov, Romania; Clay $10,000	(Romania) Irina-Camelia Begu; 4–6 6–4 6–1	(Romania) Diana Enache	(Romania) Sabina Lupu (Romania) Laura-Ioana Andrei	(Romania) Diana Marcu (Romania) Camelia Hristea (Switzerland) Conny Perrin (Romania) Diana Gae	
September 1, 2008	(Romania) Brașov, Romania; Clay $10,000	(Romania) Laura-Ioana Andrei (Romania) Irina-Camelia Begu; 6–2 6–2	(Romania) Bianca Hîncu (Romania) Cristina Madalina Stancu	(Romania) Sabina Lupu (Romania) Laura-Ioana Andrei	(Romania) Diana Marcu (Romania) Camelia Hristea (Switzerland) Conny Perrin (Romania) Diana Gae	
September 1, 2008	(Bosnia and Herzegovina) Brčko, Bosnia and Herzegovina; Clay $10,000	(Serbia) Bojana Jovanovski; 6–4 3–6 6–2	(France) Gracia Radovanovic	(Slovakia) Patrícia Verešová (Serbia) Zorica Petrov	(Hungary) Aleksandra Filipovski (Australia) Marija Mirkovic (Croatia) Indire Akiki (Belgium) Apollonia Melzani	
September 1, 2008	(Bosnia and Herzegovina) Brčko, Bosnia and Herzegovina; Clay $10,000	(Slovakia) Katarina Poljaková (Slovakia) Zuzana Zlochová; 6–1 1–6 [10–8]	(Hungary) Aleksandra Filipovski (Hungary) Virág Németh	(Slovakia) Patrícia Verešová (Serbia) Zorica Petrov	(Hungary) Aleksandra Filipovski (Australia) Marija Mirkovic (Croatia) Indire Akiki (Belgium) Apollonia Melzani	
September 1, 2008	(Argentina) Buenos Aires, Argentina; Clay $10,000	(Brazil) Roxane Vaisemberg; 6–2 7–5	(Argentina) María Irigoyen	(Argentina) Agustina Lepore (Argentina) Tatiana Búa	(Argentina) Emilia Yorio (Uruguay) Estefanía Craciún (Argentina) Verónica Spiegel (Chile) Cecilia Costa	
September 1, 2008	(Argentina) Buenos Aires, Argentina; Clay $10,000	(Uruguay) Estefanía Craciún (Argentina) María Irigoyen; 1–6 6–1 [10–2]	(Argentina) Mailen Auroux (Brazil) Roxane Vaisemberg	(Argentina) Agustina Lepore (Argentina) Tatiana Búa	(Argentina) Emilia Yorio (Uruguay) Estefanía Craciún (Argentina) Verónica Spiegel (Chile) Cecilia Costa	
September 1, 2008	(South Korea) Goyang, South Korea; Hard $10,000	(Japan) Ayaka Maekawa; 6–4 6–3	(South Korea) Kim Jooh-young	(South Korea) Yu Min-hwa (South Korea) Kim Sun-jung	(South Korea) Chae Kyung-yee (South Korea) Kim Hae-sung (South Korea) Han Na-lae (South Korea) Lee Jin-a	
September 1, 2008	(South Korea) Goyang, South Korea; Hard $10,000	(South Korea) Chae Kyung-yee (South Korea) Chang Kyung-mi; 7–5 3–6 [10–5]	(South Korea) Kim So-jung (Japan) Ayaka Maekawa	(South Korea) Yu Min-hwa (South Korea) Kim Sun-jung	(South Korea) Chae Kyung-yee (South Korea) Kim Hae-sung (South Korea) Han Na-lae (South Korea) Lee Jin-a	
September 1, 2008	(Netherlands) Alphen a/d Rijn, Netherlands; Clay $25,000	(Germany) Stephanie Gehrlein; 7–6^{(3)} 6–0	(Argentina) Florencia Molinero	(Portugal) Frederica Piedade (Netherlands) Chayenne Ewijk	(Netherlands) Pauline Wong (Netherlands) Marlot Meddens (Russia) Anastasia Poltoratskaya (Ukraine) Lesia Tsurenko	
September 1, 2008	(Netherlands) Alphen a/d Rijn, Netherlands; Clay $25,000	(Ukraine) Lesia Tsurenko (Argentina) Florencia Molinero; 4–6 7–5 [10–7]	(Croatia) Darija Jurak (Serbia) Vojislava Lukić	(Portugal) Frederica Piedade (Netherlands) Chayenne Ewijk	(Netherlands) Pauline Wong (Netherlands) Marlot Meddens (Russia) Anastasia Poltoratskaya (Ukraine) Lesia Tsurenko	
September 1, 2008	(Czech Republic) Brno, Czech Republic; Clay $25,000	(Czech Republic) Zuzana Ondrášková; 6–4 3–6 6–2	(Latvia) Anastasija Sevastova	(Czech Republic) Sandra Záhlavová (Slovakia) Lenka Juríková	(Czech Republic) Iveta Gerlová (Germany) Dominice Ripoll (Slovakia) Dominika Nociarová (Czech Republic) Simona Dobrá	
September 1, 2008	(Czech Republic) Brno, Czech Republic; Clay $25,000	(Poland) Olga Brózda (Poland) Magdalena Kiszczyńska; 6–2 6–2	(Czech Republic) Hana Birnerová (Czech Republic) Darina Šeděnková	(Czech Republic) Sandra Záhlavová (Slovakia) Lenka Juríková	(Czech Republic) Iveta Gerlová (Germany) Dominice Ripoll (Slovakia) Dominika Nociarová (Czech Republic) Simona Dobrá	
September 1, 2008	(Italy) Martina Franca, Italy; Clay $25,000	(Bosnia and Herzegovina) Mervana Jugić-Salkić; 6–4 4–6 6–1	(Italy) Anna Floris	(Spain) Eloisa Compostizo de Andrés (Italy) Evelyn Mayr	(Austria) Patricia Mayr (Italy) Verdiana Verardi (Germany) Tanja Ostertag (Ukraine) Lyudmyla Kichenok	
September 1, 2008	(Italy) Martina Franca, Italy; Clay $25,000	(Italy) Elena Pioppo (Italy) Lisa Sabino; 3–6 6–4 [10–7]	(Italy) Anna Floris (Italy) Valentina Sulpizio	(Spain) Eloisa Compostizo de Andrés (Italy) Evelyn Mayr	(Austria) Patricia Mayr (Italy) Verdiana Verardi (Germany) Tanja Ostertag (Ukraine) Lyudmyla Kichenok	
September 1, 2008	(Japan) Tsukuba, Japan; Hard $25,000	(Chinese Taipei) Hsieh Su-wei; 4–6 6–3 6–0	(China) Xie Yan-ze	(Japan) Tomoko Yonemura (Japan) Junri Namigata	(Japan) Kumiko Iijima (Japan) Kimiko Date-Krumm (Thailand) Suchanun Viratprasert (Chinese Taipei) Chan Chin-wei	
September 1, 2008	(Japan) Tsukuba, Japan; Hard $25,000	(Chinese Taipei) Chan Chin-wei (Chinese Taipei) Hwang I-hsuan; 6–0 6–4	(Japan) Maki Arai (Japan) Yurika Sema	(Japan) Tomoko Yonemura (Japan) Junri Namigata	(Japan) Kumiko Iijima (Japan) Kimiko Date-Krumm (Thailand) Suchanun Viratprasert (Chinese Taipei) Chan Chin-wei	
September 1, 2008	(Slovenia) Maribor, Slovenia; Clay $50,000	(Slovenia) Maša Zec Peškirič; 6–2 7–6^{(6)}	(Slovakia) Kristína Kučová	(Croatia) Petra Martić (Hungary) Katalin Marosi	(Belarus) Anastasiya Yakimova (Germany) Angelique Kerber (Germany) Andrea Petkovic (Hungary) Kira Nagy	
September 1, 2008	(Slovenia) Maribor, Slovenia; Clay $50,000	(Germany) Carmen Klaschka (Germany) Andrea Petkovic; 6–0 2–6 [10–3]	(Hungary) Kira Nagy (Belarus) Anastasiya Yakimova	(Croatia) Petra Martić (Hungary) Katalin Marosi	(Belarus) Anastasiya Yakimova (Germany) Angelique Kerber (Germany) Andrea Petkovic (Hungary) Kira Nagy	
September 1, 2008	(France) Denain, France; Clay $75,000	(Germany) Kristina Barrois; 6–2 6–4	(France) Kinnie Laisné	(France) Violette Huck (Estonia) Maret Ani	(Spain) Lourdes Domínguez Lino (Georgia (country)) Margalita Chakhnashvili (France) Mathilde Johansson (Russia) Ekaterina Ivanova	
September 1, 2008	(France) Denain, France; Clay $75,000	(Estonia) Maret Ani (Spain) Lourdes Domínguez Lino; 6–0 7–5	(France) Stéphanie Cohen-Aloro (Canada) Marie-Ève Pelletier	(France) Violette Huck (Estonia) Maret Ani	(Spain) Lourdes Domínguez Lino (Georgia (country)) Margalita Chakhnashvili (France) Mathilde Johansson (Russia) Ekaterina Ivanova	
September 8, 2008	(Argentina) Bogotá, Colombia; Clay $10,000	(Bulgaria) Aleksandrina Naydenova; 6–4 7–6^{(2)}	(Colombia) Viky Núñez Fuentes	(Colombia) Paula Catalina Robles Garcia (Colombia) Carla Manzi	(Chile) Melisa Miranda (Colombia) Rocio Galan (United States) Danielle Mills (Colombia) Paula Zabala	
September 8, 2008	(Argentina) Bogotá, Colombia; Clay $10,000	(Colombia) Viky Núñez Fuentes (Colombia) Paula Catalina Robles Garcia; 6–3 6–4	(Colombia) Yuliana Lizarazo (Bulgaria) Aleksandrina Naydenova	(Colombia) Paula Catalina Robles Garcia (Colombia) Carla Manzi	(Chile) Melisa Miranda (Colombia) Rocio Galan (United States) Danielle Mills (Colombia) Paula Zabala	
September 8, 2008	(Hungary) Budapest, Hungary; Clay $10,000	(Romania) Irina-Camelia Begu; 7–5 6–1	(Romania) Laura-Ioana Andrei	(Hungary) Aleksandra Filipovski (Romania) Veronica Popovici	(France) Gracia Radovanovic (Poland) Sylwia Zagórska (Czech Republic) Andrea Berková (Switzerland) Viktorija Golubic	
September 8, 2008	(Hungary) Budapest, Hungary; Clay $10,000	(Romania) Laura-Ioana Andrei (Romania) Irina-Camelia Begu; 6–2 6–4	(Belgium) Davinia Lobbinger (Israel) Efrat Mishor	(Hungary) Aleksandra Filipovski (Romania) Veronica Popovici	(France) Gracia Radovanovic (Poland) Sylwia Zagórska (Czech Republic) Andrea Berková (Switzerland) Viktorija Golubic	
September 8, 2008	(Mexico) Celaya, Mexico; Clay $10,000	(Slovakia) Zuzana Zemenová; 7–5 6–1	(United States) Katie Ruckert	(United States) Jennifer Elie (Mexico) Erika Clarke	(Mexico) Daniela Múñoz Gallegos (Mexico) Lorena Arias (Peru) Ingrid Esperanza Vargas Calvo (Germany) Laura Bsoul	
September 8, 2008	(Mexico) Celaya, Mexico; Clay $10,000	(Mexico) Erika Clarke (Mexico) Daniela Múñoz Gallegos; 1–6 6–1 [10–5]	(Mexico) Lorena Arias (Mexico) Angelica Chavez	(United States) Jennifer Elie (Mexico) Erika Clarke	(Mexico) Daniela Múñoz Gallegos (Mexico) Lorena Arias (Peru) Ingrid Esperanza Vargas Calvo (Germany) Laura Bsoul	
September 8, 2008	(Italy) Ciampino, Italy; Clay $10,000	(Italy) Alexia Virgili; 7–5 2–6 6–2	(Italy) Claudia Giovine	(Italy) Annalisa Bona (France) Elixane Lechemia	(Italy) Federica Quercia (Italy) Stefania Chieppa (Italy) Nancy Rustignoli (Belgium) Appollonia Melzani	
September 8, 2008	(Italy) Ciampino, Italy; Clay $10,000	(Italy) Claudia Giovine (Russia) Regina Kulikova; 6–4 4–6 [10–7]	(Italy) Stefania Chieppa (Italy) Lisa Sabino	(Italy) Annalisa Bona (France) Elixane Lechemia	(Italy) Federica Quercia (Italy) Stefania Chieppa (Italy) Nancy Rustignoli (Belgium) Appollonia Melzani	
September 8, 2008	(South Korea) Go Yang, South Korea; Hard $10,000	(South Korea) Chae Kyung-yee; 6–4 6–4	(South Korea) Lee Jin-a	(South Korea) Kim Sun-jung (South Korea) Chang Kyung-mi	(Morocco) Nadia Lalami (South Korea) Kim Jooh-young (South Korea) Kim Na-ri (South Korea) Yu Min-hwa	
September 8, 2008	(South Korea) Go Yang, South Korea; Hard $10,000	(South Korea) Chae Kyung-yee (South Korea) Chang Kyung-mi; 6–3 4–6 [10–8]	(South Korea) Cho Jeong-a (South Korea) Kim Ji-young	(South Korea) Kim Sun-jung (South Korea) Chang Kyung-mi	(Morocco) Nadia Lalami (South Korea) Kim Jooh-young (South Korea) Kim Na-ri (South Korea) Yu Min-hwa	
September 8, 2008	(Austria) Innsbruck, Austria; Clay $10,000	(Austria) Evelyn Mayr; 6–1 2–6 6–1	(Ukraine) Irina Buryachok	(Switzerland) Nicole Riner (Switzerland) Amra Sadiković	(Switzerland) Conny Perrin (Italy) Julia Mayr (Austria) Veronika Sepp (Georgia (country)) Oksana Kalashnikova	
September 8, 2008	(Austria) Innsbruck, Austria; Clay $10,000	(Ukraine) Irina Buryachok (Georgia (country)) Oksana Kalashnikova; 3–6 6–3 [10–7]	(Switzerland) Conny Perrin (Switzerland) Nicole Riner	(Switzerland) Nicole Riner (Switzerland) Amra Sadiković	(Switzerland) Conny Perrin (Italy) Julia Mayr (Austria) Veronika Sepp (Georgia (country)) Oksana Kalashnikova	
September 8, 2008	(Spain) Lleida, Spain; Clay $10,000	(Spain) Yera Campos Molina; 6–4 6–2	(Russia) Julia Parasyuk	(Spain) Sandra Soler Sola (Georgia (country)) Ekaterine Gorgodze	(Spain) Cynthia Prieto Garcia (Mexico) Ximena Hermoso (Georgia (country)) Sofia Kvatsabaia (United States) Kristi Miller	
September 8, 2008	(Spain) Lleida, Spain; Clay $10,000	(North Macedonia) Aleksandra Josifoska (United States) Kristi Miller; 6–4 7–5	(United Kingdom) Natasha Khan (Spain) Lucía Sainz	(Spain) Sandra Soler Sola (Georgia (country)) Ekaterine Gorgodze	(Spain) Cynthia Prieto Garcia (Mexico) Ximena Hermoso (Georgia (country)) Sofia Kvatsabaia (United States) Kristi Miller	
September 8, 2008	(Brazil) Santos, Brazil; Clay $10,000	(Brazil) Fernanda Hermenegildo; 6–3 6–4	(Brazil) Natalia Guitler	(Brazil) Fernanda Faria (Brazil) Paula Cristina Gonçalves	(Paraguay) Isabella Robbiani (Brazil) Natalia Cheng (Venezuela) Josymar Escalona (Brazil) Carla Tiene	
September 8, 2008	(Brazil) Santos, Brazil; Clay $10,000	(Brazil) Joana Cortez (Brazil) Natalia Guitler; 6–1 6–3	(Brazil) Ana Clara Duarte (Brazil) Fernanda Hermenegildo	(Brazil) Fernanda Faria (Brazil) Paula Cristina Gonçalves	(Paraguay) Isabella Robbiani (Brazil) Natalia Cheng (Venezuela) Josymar Escalona (Brazil) Carla Tiene	
September 8, 2008	(Japan) Noto, Japan; Carpet $25,000	(Thailand) Suchanun Viratprasert; 6–4 6–4	(Japan) Kumiko Iijima	(United Kingdom) Jade Curtis (Thailand) Varatchaya Wongteanchai	(Japan) Shiho Akita (Japan) Ai Koga (Japan) Maya Kato (Chinese Taipei) Chan Chin-Wei	
September 8, 2008	(Japan) Noto, Japan; Carpet $25,000	(Chinese Taipei) Chan Chin-wei (Chinese Taipei) Chen Yi; 6–3 6–2	(Japan) Tomoko Dokei (Japan) Yuko Kurata	(United Kingdom) Jade Curtis (Thailand) Varatchaya Wongteanchai	(Japan) Shiho Akita (Japan) Ai Koga (Japan) Maya Kato (Chinese Taipei) Chan Chin-Wei	
September 8, 2008	(Australia) Rockhampton, Australia; Hard $25,000	(Australia) Monique Adamczak; 4–6 6–2 7–6^{(4)}	(Slovakia) Jarmila Gajdošová	(New Zealand) Sacha Jones (China) Zhou Yimiao	(United States) Alexis Prousis (Australia) Sally Peers (Australia) Emelyn Starr (Japan) Natsumi Hamamura	
September 8, 2008	(Australia) Rockhampton, Australia; Hard $25,000	(Japan) Remi Tezuka (China) Zhou Yimiao; 7–6^{(2)} 6–4	(Slovakia) Jarmila Gajdošová (Sweden) Michaela Johansson	(New Zealand) Sacha Jones (China) Zhou Yimiao	(United States) Alexis Prousis (Australia) Sally Peers (Australia) Emelyn Starr (Japan) Natsumi Hamamura	
September 8, 2008	(Bulgaria) Rousse, Bulgaria; Clay $25,000	(Slovakia) Lenka Wienerová; 6–4 6–4	(Russia) Ksenia Pervak	(Russia) Varvara Galanina (Hungary) Kira Nagy	(Germany) Laura Siegemund (Russia) Vitalia Diatchenko (Bulgaria) Dessislava Mladenova (Bulgaria) Elitsa Kostova	
September 8, 2008	(Bulgaria) Rousse, Bulgaria; Clay $25,000	(Russia) Alexandra Panova (Russia) Ksenia Pervak; 6–2 6–7^{(5)} [10–5]	(Russia) Vitalia Diatchenko (Russia) Eugeniya Pashkova	(Russia) Varvara Galanina (Hungary) Kira Nagy	(Germany) Laura Siegemund (Russia) Vitalia Diatchenko (Bulgaria) Dessislava Mladenova (Bulgaria) Elitsa Kostova	
September 8, 2008	(Bosnia and Herzegovina) Sarajevo, Bosnia and Herzegovina; Clay $25,000	(Slovenia) Maša Zec Peškirič; 6–1 6–3	(Slovakia) Klaudia Boczová	(Romania) Alexandra Dulgheru (Serbia) Ana Jovanović	(Italy) Alberta Brianti (Slovenia) Polona Hercog (Australia) Marija Mirkovic (Switzerland) Stefania Boffa	
September 8, 2008	(Bosnia and Herzegovina) Sarajevo, Bosnia and Herzegovina; Clay $25,000	(Italy) Alberta Brianti (Slovenia) Polona Hercog; 6–4 7–5	(Turkey) Çağla Büyükakçay (Israel) Julia Glushko	(Romania) Alexandra Dulgheru (Serbia) Ana Jovanović	(Italy) Alberta Brianti (Slovenia) Polona Hercog (Australia) Marija Mirkovic (Switzerland) Stefania Boffa	
September 8, 2008	(Greece) Athens, Greece; Clay $100,000+H	(Spain) Lourdes Domínguez Lino; 6–4 6–4	(Romania) Sorana Cîrstea	(Belgium) Kirsten Flipkens (Slovakia) Magdaléna Rybáriková	(Estonia) Maret Ani (France) Mathilde Johansson (Italy) Roberta Vinci (Russia) Galina Voskoboeva	
September 8, 2008	(Greece) Athens, Greece; Clay $100,000+H	(Romania) Sorana Cîrstea (Russia) Galina Voskoboeva; 6–2 6–4	(Germany) Kristina Barrois (Germany) Julia Schruff	(Belgium) Kirsten Flipkens (Slovakia) Magdaléna Rybáriková	(Estonia) Maret Ani (France) Mathilde Johansson (Italy) Roberta Vinci (Russia) Galina Voskoboeva	
September 15, 2008	(Italy) Casale, Italy; Clay $10,000	(Croatia) Matea Mezak; 7–5 2–6 6–1	(Italy) Silvia Disderi	(Ukraine) Irina Buryachok (Switzerland) Amra Sadiković	(Sweden) Hanna Nooni (Italy) Alice Moroni (Italy) Federica Quercia (Georgia (country)) Oksana Kalashnikova	
September 15, 2008	(Italy) Casale, Italy; Clay $10,000	(Portugal) Catarina Ferreira (Georgia (country)) Oksana Kalashnikova; 7–5 7–6^{(5)}	(Switzerland) Nicole Riner (Switzerland) Amra Sadiković	(Ukraine) Irina Buryachok (Switzerland) Amra Sadiković	(Sweden) Hanna Nooni (Italy) Alice Moroni (Italy) Federica Quercia (Georgia (country)) Oksana Kalashnikova	
September 15, 2008	(Mexico) Chihuahua, Mexico; Clay $10,000	(Slovakia) Zuzana Zemenová; 6–2 6–2	(United States) Jennifer Elie	(Colombia) Paula Zabala (Mexico) Erika Clarke	(Mexico) Daniela Múñoz Gallegos (Peru) Ingrid Esperanza Vargas Calvo (Denmark) Maria Christensen (United States) Amanda Marie Taylor	
September 15, 2008	(Mexico) Chihuahua, Mexico; Clay $10,000	(Mexico) Lorena Arias (Colombia) Paula Zabala; 2–6 6–4 [10–5]	(Mexico) Erika Clarke (Mexico) Daniela Múñoz Gallegos	(Colombia) Paula Zabala (Mexico) Erika Clarke	(Mexico) Daniela Múñoz Gallegos (Peru) Ingrid Esperanza Vargas Calvo (Denmark) Maria Christensen (United States) Amanda Marie Taylor	
September 15, 2008	(Japan) Kyoto, Japan; Carpet $10,000	(Japan) Ayaka Maekawa; 7–5 6–4	(Chinese Taipei) Hsu Wen-hsin	(Japan) Anastasia Malhotra (Japan) Yumi Nakano	(Japan) Maki Arai (Japan) Shiho Akita (Japan) Akiko Omae (Thailand) Varatchaya Wongteanchai	
September 15, 2008	(Japan) Kyoto, Japan; Carpet $10,000	(Japan) Ayumi Oka (Thailand) Varatchaya Wongteanchai; 5–7 6–2 [10–2]	(Japan) Maki Arai (Japan) Yurina Koshino	(Japan) Anastasia Malhotra (Japan) Yumi Nakano	(Japan) Maki Arai (Japan) Shiho Akita (Japan) Akiko Omae (Thailand) Varatchaya Wongteanchai	
September 15, 2008	(France) Limoges, France; Hard $10,000	(Russia) Marina Melnikova; 1–0 ret.	(Russia) Valeria Savinykh	(United Kingdom) Anna Smith (Romania) Alexandra Damaschin	(France) Nathalie Mohn (France) Myrtille Georges (France) Adeline Goncalves (France) Anne-Valerie Evain	
September 15, 2008	(France) Limoges, France; Hard $10,000	(United Kingdom) Yasmin Clarke (United Kingdom) Olivia Scarfi; 7–6^{(5)} 5–7 [10–8]	(Belarus) Volha Duko (Russia) Elina Gasanova	(United Kingdom) Anna Smith (Romania) Alexandra Damaschin	(France) Nathalie Mohn (France) Myrtille Georges (France) Adeline Goncalves (France) Anne-Valerie Evain	
September 15, 2008	(Uzbekistan) Qarshi, Uzbekistan; Hard $25,000	(Russia) Elena Kulikova; 2–6 6–3 6–4	(Austria) Nikola Hofmanova	(Ukraine) Lesia Tsurenko (Uzbekistan) Vlada Ekshibarova	(Kyrgyzstan) Ksenia Palkina (India) Ankita Bhambri (Italy) Nicole Clerico (Turkey) Pemra Özgen	
September 15, 2008	(Uzbekistan) Qarshi, Uzbekistan; Hard $25,000	(Belarus) Ima Bohush (Ukraine) Lesia Tsurenko; 6–3 6–1	(Uzbekistan) Albina Khabibulina (Uzbekistan) Alexandra Kolesnichenko	(Ukraine) Lesia Tsurenko (Uzbekistan) Vlada Ekshibarova	(Kyrgyzstan) Ksenia Palkina (India) Ankita Bhambri (Italy) Nicole Clerico (Turkey) Pemra Özgen	
September 15, 2008	(Australia) Kawana Waters, Australia; Hard $25,000	(Slovakia) Jarmila Gajdošová; 7–5 6–4	(Australia) Isabella Holland	(China) Zhou Yi-Miao (New Zealand) Sacha Jones	(United States) Alexis Prousis (Australia) Sally Peers (Sweden) Michaela Johansson (Australia) Alenka Hubacek	
September 15, 2008	(Australia) Kawana Waters, Australia; Hard $25,000	(United Kingdom) Jocelyn Rae (Australia) Emelyn Starr; 6–4 4–6 [10–4]	(United States) Alexis Prousis (United States) Robin Stephenson	(China) Zhou Yi-Miao (New Zealand) Sacha Jones	(United States) Alexis Prousis (Australia) Sally Peers (Sweden) Michaela Johansson (Australia) Alenka Hubacek	
September 15, 2008	(Spain) Madrid, Spain; Hard $25,000	(Germany) Angelique Kerber; 6–1 6–3	(Spain) Estrella Cabeza Candela	(Portugal) Frederica Piedade (Russia) Regina Kulikova	(France) Julie Coin (Spain) Paula Fondevila Castro (Germany) Stephanie Gehrlein (Spain) Sara del Barrio Aragón	
September 15, 2008	(Spain) Madrid, Spain; Hard $25,000	(France) Julie Coin (France) Irena Pavlovic; 6–3 6–4	(Ukraine) Yuliya Beygelzimer (Russia) Anastasia Poltoratskaya	(Portugal) Frederica Piedade (Russia) Regina Kulikova	(France) Julie Coin (Spain) Paula Fondevila Castro (Germany) Stephanie Gehrlein (Spain) Sara del Barrio Aragón	
September 15, 2008	(Italy) Mestre, Italy; Clay $50,000	(Russia) Ekaterina Ivanova; 6–3 3–0 ret.	(Italy) Romina Oprandi	(Italy) Tathiana Garbin (Germany) Angelika Rösch	(Hungary) Katalin Marosi (Croatia) Karolina Šprem (Czech Republic) Lucie Hradecká (Germany) Kathrin Wörle	
September 15, 2008	(Italy) Mestre, Italy; Clay $50,000	(Bosnia and Herzegovina) Mervana Jugić-Salkić (France) Aurélie Védy; 6–2 6–3	(Georgia (country)) Margalita Chakhnashvili (France) Violette Huck	(Italy) Tathiana Garbin (Germany) Angelika Rösch	(Hungary) Katalin Marosi (Croatia) Karolina Šprem (Czech Republic) Lucie Hradecká (Germany) Kathrin Wörle	
September 15, 2008	(United States) Albuquerque, New Mexico, USA; Hard $75,000	(United States) Julie Ditty; 6–4 7–6^{(3)}	(Paraguay) Rossana de los Ríos	(Colombia) Mariana Duque (Georgia (country)) Anna Tatishvili	(United States) Varvara Lepchenko (Argentina) Jorgelina Cravero (United Kingdom) Georgie Stoop (Croatia) Jelena Pandžić	
September 15, 2008	(United States) Albuquerque, New Mexico, USA; Hard $75,000	(United States) Julie Ditty (United States) Carly Gullickson; 6–3 6–4	(Argentina) Jorgelina Cravero (Argentina) Betina Jozami	(Colombia) Mariana Duque (Georgia (country)) Anna Tatishvili	(United States) Varvara Lepchenko (Argentina) Jorgelina Cravero (United Kingdom) Georgie Stoop (Croatia) Jelena Pandžić	
September 15, 2008	(Bulgaria) Sofia, Bulgaria; Clay $100,000	(Spain) Nuria Llagostera Vives; 6–2 6–3	(Bulgaria) Tsvetana Pironkova	(France) Mathilde Johansson (Ukraine) Viktoriya Kutuzova	(Romania) Sorana Cîrstea (France) Séverine Brémond (Czech Republic) Petra Kvitová (Spain) Sílvia Soler Espinosa	
September 15, 2008	(Bulgaria) Sofia, Bulgaria; Clay $100,000	(Estonia) Maret Ani (Czech Republic) Renata Voráčová; 7–6^{(4)} 7–6^{(9)}	(Spain) Lourdes Domínguez Lino (Spain) Arantxa Parra Santonja	(France) Mathilde Johansson (Ukraine) Viktoriya Kutuzova	(Romania) Sorana Cîrstea (France) Séverine Brémond (Czech Republic) Petra Kvitová (Spain) Sílvia Soler Espinosa	
September 22, 2008	(France) Clermont-Ferrand, France; Hard $10,000	(Russia) Ksenia Lykina; 6–4 6–4	(France) Samantha Schoeffel	(Italy) Giulia Gatto-Monticone (Russia) Valeria Savinykh	(France) Marie-Perrine Baudouin (United Kingdom) Emily Webley-Smith (France) Adeline Goncalves (Netherlands) Bibiane Schoofs	
September 22, 2008	(France) Clermont-Ferrand, France; Hard $10,000	(Russia) Ksenia Lykina (Italy) Vivienne Vierin; 6–3 6–2	(France) Samantha Schoeffel (Netherlands) Bibiane Schoofs	(Italy) Giulia Gatto-Monticone (Russia) Valeria Savinykh	(France) Marie-Perrine Baudouin (United Kingdom) Emily Webley-Smith (France) Adeline Goncalves (Netherlands) Bibiane Schoofs	
September 22, 2008	(Brazil) Serra Negra, Brazil; Clay $10,000	(Argentina) Aranza Salut; 6–4 6–4	(Peru) Bianca Botto	(Colombia) Karen Emilia Castiblanco Duarte (Brazil) Ana Clara Duarte	(Venezuela) Josymar Escalona (Brazil) Fernanda Hermenegildo (Venezuela) Marina Giral Lores (Brazil) Natalia Guitler	
September 22, 2008	(Brazil) Serra Negra, Brazil; Clay $10,000	(Brazil) Carla Forte (Brazil) Carla Tiene; 6–4 2–6 [10–8]	(Brazil) Ana Clara Duarte (Brazil) Fernanda Hermenegildo	(Colombia) Karen Emilia Castiblanco Duarte (Brazil) Ana Clara Duarte	(Venezuela) Josymar Escalona (Brazil) Fernanda Hermenegildo (Venezuela) Marina Giral Lores (Brazil) Natalia Guitler	
September 22, 2008	(Bulgaria) Sofia, Bulgaria; Clay $10,000	(Ukraine) Alyona Sotnikova; 6–2 4–6 6–3	(Hungary) Réka Luca Jani	(Bulgaria) Dalia Zafirova (Hungary) Aleksandra Filipovski	(Netherlands) Marlot Meddens (France) Émilie Bacquet (Romania) Laura-Ioana Andrei (Netherlands) Leonie Mekel	
September 22, 2008	(Bulgaria) Sofia, Bulgaria; Clay $10,000	(Ukraine) Maria Malkhasyan (Ukraine) Oksana Pavlova; 6–2 6–1	(France) Émilie Bacquet (Bulgaria) Dessislava Mladenova	(Bulgaria) Dalia Zafirova (Hungary) Aleksandra Filipovski	(Netherlands) Marlot Meddens (France) Émilie Bacquet (Romania) Laura-Ioana Andrei (Netherlands) Leonie Mekel	
September 22, 2008	(Greece) Volos, Greece; Carpet $10,000	(Poland) Justyna Jegiołka; 6–4 6–1	(Slovenia) Mika Urbančič	(Latvia) Diāna Marcinkēviča (Russia) Renata Bakieva	(Ukraine) Ganna Piven (Greece) Stamatia Fafaliou (Italy) Raffaella Bindi (Russia) Diana Arutyunova	
September 22, 2008	(Greece) Volos, Greece; Carpet $10,000	(Italy) Nicole Clerico (Slovenia) Mika Urbančič; 6–2 6–1	(Poland) Justyna Jegiołka (Switzerland) Milika Tomic	(Latvia) Diāna Marcinkēviča (Russia) Renata Bakieva	(Ukraine) Ganna Piven (Greece) Stamatia Fafaliou (Italy) Raffaella Bindi (Russia) Diana Arutyunova	
September 22, 2008	(Spain) Granada, Spain; Hard $25,000	(Russia) Regina Kulikova; 6–3 6–4	(Spain) Estrella Cabeza Candela	(France) Karla Mraz (Czech Republic) Andrea Hlaváčková	(North Macedonia) Aleksandra Josifoska (Spain) Maite Gabarrús-Alonso (Spain) Sara del Barrio Aragón (Russia) Julia Parasyuk	
September 22, 2008	(Spain) Granada, Spain; Hard $25,000	(Spain) Leticia Costas Moreira (Spain) Maite Gabarrús-Alonso; Walkover	(Russia) Regina Kulikova (France) Irena Pavlovic	(France) Karla Mraz (Czech Republic) Andrea Hlaváčková	(North Macedonia) Aleksandra Josifoska (Spain) Maite Gabarrús-Alonso (Spain) Sara del Barrio Aragón (Russia) Julia Parasyuk	
September 22, 2008	(Italy) Lecce, Italy; Clay $25,000	(Germany) Angelika Rösch; 6–2 6–7^{(5)} 7–5	(Bosnia and Herzegovina) Mervana Jugić-Salkić	(Slovakia) Klaudia Boczová (Italy) Romina Oprandi	(Slovakia) Michaela Pochabová (Italy) Evelyn Mayr (Georgia (country)) Margalita Chakhnashvili (Italy) Giulia Gabba	
September 22, 2008	(Italy) Lecce, Italy; Clay $25,000	(Slovakia) Klaudia Boczová (Slovakia) Michaela Pochabová; 6–4 6–1	(Italy) Stefania Chieppa (Italy) Giulia Gabba	(Slovakia) Klaudia Boczová (Italy) Romina Oprandi	(Slovakia) Michaela Pochabová (Italy) Evelyn Mayr (Georgia (country)) Margalita Chakhnashvili (Italy) Giulia Gabba	
September 22, 2008	(Montenegro) Podgorica, Montenegro; Clay $25,000	(Slovenia) Maša Zec Peškirič; 6–3 7–6^{(1)}	(Slovakia) Dominika Nociarová	(France) Aurélie Védy (Romania) Elora Dabija	(Slovakia) Kristína Kučová (Croatia) Darija Jurak (Greece) Anna Gerasimou (Czech Republic) Michaela Paštiková	
September 22, 2008	(Montenegro) Podgorica, Montenegro; Clay $25,000	(Serbia) Neda Kozić (Bosnia and Herzegovina) Sandra Martinović; 7–6^{(5)} 6–2	(Argentina) Erica Krauth (Sweden) Hanna Nooni	(France) Aurélie Védy (Romania) Elora Dabija	(Slovakia) Kristína Kučová (Croatia) Darija Jurak (Greece) Anna Gerasimou (Czech Republic) Michaela Paštiková	
September 22, 2008	(United States) Ashland, Kentucky, United States; Hard $50,000	(United States) Varvara Lepchenko; 5–7 6–0 6–2	(United States) Carly Gullickson	(Colombia) Mariana Duque (United States) Shenay Perry	(Portugal) Neuza Silva (United States) Lauren Albanese (United States) Madison Brengle (Argentina) Betina Jozami	
September 22, 2008	(United States) Ashland, Kentucky, United States; Hard $50,000	(Latvia) Līga Dekmeijere (Croatia) Jelena Pandžić; 6–3 3–6 [10–8]	(United States) Julie Ditty (United States) Carly Gullickson	(Colombia) Mariana Duque (United States) Shenay Perry	(Portugal) Neuza Silva (United States) Lauren Albanese (United States) Madison Brengle (Argentina) Betina Jozami	
September 22, 2008	(United Kingdom) Shrewsbury, Great Britain; Hard $75,000	(Italy) Roberta Vinci; 7–5 7–5	(Estonia) Maret Ani	(Germany) Kristina Barrois (United Kingdom) Laura Robson	(Germany) Vanessa Henke (Switzerland) Stefanie Vögele (Israel) Tzipi Obziler (Belgium) Kirsten Flipkens	
September 22, 2008	(United Kingdom) Shrewsbury, Great Britain; Hard $75,000	(Sweden) Johanna Larsson (United Kingdom) Anna Smith; 7–6^{(6)} 6–4	(United Kingdom) Sarah Borwell (United States) Courtney Nagle	(Germany) Kristina Barrois (United Kingdom) Laura Robson	(Germany) Vanessa Henke (Switzerland) Stefanie Vögele (Israel) Tzipi Obziler (Belgium) Kirsten Flipkens	
September 29, 2008	(Brazil) Curitiba, Brazil; Clay $10,000	(Brazil) Fernanda Hermenegildo; 6–4 1–6 6–3	(Venezuela) Marina Giral Lores	(Peru) Ingrid Esperanza Vargas Calvo (Brazil) Carla Tiene	(Brazil) Rebeca Neves (Brazil) Natalia Cheng (Argentina) Aranza Salut (Brazil) Natalia Guitler	
September 29, 2008	(Brazil) Curitiba, Brazil; Clay $10,000	(Colombia) Karen Castiblanco Duarte (Argentina) Aranza Salut; 1–6 6–2 [10–8]	(Brazil) Gisele Miró (Brazil) Isabela Miró	(Peru) Ingrid Esperanza Vargas Calvo (Brazil) Carla Tiene	(Brazil) Rebeca Neves (Brazil) Natalia Cheng (Argentina) Aranza Salut (Brazil) Natalia Guitler	
September 29, 2008	(Spain) Les Franqueses del Valles, Spain; Hard $10,000	(Germany) Justine Ozga; 4–6 6–3 7–6^{(3)}	(United States) Kristi Miller	(Russia) Ekaterina Ivanova (Poland) Katarzyna Piter	(Spain) Anna Miguel Ivern (United Kingdom) Amanda Carreras (Spain) Yera Campos Molina (Italy) Elisa Balsamo	
September 29, 2008	(Spain) Les Franqueses del Valles, Spain; Hard $10,000	(North Macedonia) Aleksandra Josifoska (Poland) Katarzyna Piter; 6–3 2–6 [10–3]	(Serbia) Bojana Borovnica (Spain) Cristina Sanchez Quintanar	(Russia) Ekaterina Ivanova (Poland) Katarzyna Piter	(Spain) Anna Miguel Ivern (United Kingdom) Amanda Carreras (Spain) Yera Campos Molina (Italy) Elisa Balsamo	
September 29, 2008	(Greece) Mytilini, Greece; Hard $10,000	(Greece) Eirini Georgatou; 6–4 6–2	(Ukraine) Ganna Piven	(Russia) Diana Arutyunova (Italy) Giulia Bruzzone	(Italy) Raffaella Bindi (Poland) Justyna Jegiołka (Latvia) Diāna Marcinkēviča (Slovenia) Dalila Jakupovic	
September 29, 2008	(Greece) Mytilini, Greece; Hard $10,000	(Russia) Renata Bakieva (Latvia) Diāna Marcinkēviča; 6–1 6–3	(Greece) Eirini Georgatou (Australia) Jade Hopper	(Russia) Diana Arutyunova (Italy) Giulia Bruzzone	(Italy) Raffaella Bindi (Poland) Justyna Jegiołka (Latvia) Diāna Marcinkēviča (Slovenia) Dalila Jakupovic	
September 29, 2008	(Portugal) Porto, Portugal; Clay $10,000	(Belgium) Appollonia Melzani; 6–3 6–1	(Czech Republic) Kateřina Vaňková	(Portugal) Maria João Koehler (Russia) Marina Melnikova	(Portugal) Ana Catarina Nogueira (Spain) Laura Apaolaza Miradevilla (Italy) Eleonora Pinzo (Portugal) Joana Pangaio Pereira	
September 29, 2008	(Portugal) Porto, Portugal; Clay $10,000	(Czech Republic) Jana Jandová (Czech Republic) Kateřina Vaňková; 6–3 4–6 [10–6]	(Netherlands) Michelle Gerards (Russia) Marina Melnikova	(Portugal) Maria João Koehler (Russia) Marina Melnikova	(Portugal) Ana Catarina Nogueira (Spain) Laura Apaolaza Miradevilla (Italy) Eleonora Pinzo (Portugal) Joana Pangaio Pereira	
September 29, 2008	(Bulgaria) Sandanski, Bulgaria; Clay $10,000	(Netherlands) Marlot Meddens; 3–6 6–3 6–3	(Netherlands) Leoni Mekel	(Romania) Elena Bogdan (Bulgaria) Dalia Zafirova	(Bulgaria) Dia Evtimova (Romania) Laura-Ioana Andrei (Switzerland) Conny Perrin (Bulgaria) Huliya Velieva	
September 29, 2008	(Bulgaria) Sandanski, Bulgaria; Clay $10,000	(Romania) Laura-Ioana Andrei (Poland) Sylwia Zagórska; 6–3 6–1	(Romania) Elena Bogdan (Ukraine) Alyona Sotnikova	(Romania) Elena Bogdan (Bulgaria) Dalia Zafirova	(Bulgaria) Dia Evtimova (Romania) Laura-Ioana Andrei (Switzerland) Conny Perrin (Bulgaria) Huliya Velieva	
September 29, 2008	(Finland) Helsinki, Finland; Hard $25,000	(Estonia) Margit Rüütel; 6–4 6–7^{(4)} 7–6^{(7)}	(Lithuania) Lina Stančiūtė	(Austria) Patricia Mayr (Finland) Emma Laine	(Latvia) Irina Kuzmina (Canada) Marie-Ève Pelletier (France) Estelle Guisard (France) Violette Huck	
September 29, 2008	(Finland) Helsinki, Finland; Hard $25,000	(Finland) Emma Laine (Sweden) Johanna Larsson; 6–4 6–2	(Austria) Patricia Mayr (Canada) Marie-Ève Pelletier	(Austria) Patricia Mayr (Finland) Emma Laine	(Latvia) Irina Kuzmina (Canada) Marie-Ève Pelletier (France) Estelle Guisard (France) Violette Huck	
September 29, 2008	(United States) Troy, Alabama, United States; Hard $50,000	(Georgia (country)) Anna Tatishvili; 7–6^{(4)} 6–4	(United Kingdom) Georgie Stoop	(United States) Melanie Oudin (United States) Abigail Spears	(Portugal) Neuza Silva (Colombia) Catalina Castaño (United States) Shenay Perry (Croatia) Ana Savić	
September 29, 2008	(United States) Troy, Alabama, United States; Hard $50,000	(United States) Raquel Kops-Jones (United States) Abigail Spears; 6–2 6–0	(United States) Angela Haynes (India) Sunitha Rao	(United States) Melanie Oudin (United States) Abigail Spears	(Portugal) Neuza Silva (Colombia) Catalina Castaño (United States) Shenay Perry (Croatia) Ana Savić	
September 29, 2008	(Mexico) Juárez, Mexico; Clay $50,000+H	(Argentina) Betina Jozami; 2–2 ret.	(Argentina) Jorgelina Cravero	(Paraguay) Rossana de los Ríos (Argentina) Soledad Esperón	(Spain) Estrella Cabeza Candela (Russia) Alina Jidkova (United States) Lauren Albanese (Colombia) Mariana Duque	
September 29, 2008	(Mexico) Juárez, Mexico; Clay $50,000+H	(Argentina) Jorgelina Cravero (Argentina) Betina Jozami; 6–0 7–6^{(6)}	(Argentina) Soledad Esperón (Argentina) Florencia Molinero	(Paraguay) Rossana de los Ríos (Argentina) Soledad Esperón	(Spain) Estrella Cabeza Candela (Russia) Alina Jidkova (United States) Lauren Albanese (Colombia) Mariana Duque	

== See also ==
- 2008 ITF Women's Circuit (January–March)
- 2008 ITF Women's Circuit (April–June)
