= Dominika Nociarová =

Slovak tennis player

- Country (sports): Slovakia
- Born: 13 April 1984 (age 41); Banská Bystrica, Czechoslovakia
- Plays: Right-handed
- Prize money: $110,072

Singles
- Career record: 236–184
- Career titles: 6 ITF
- Highest ranking: No. 202 (24 July 2006)

Doubles
- Career record: 7–17
- Career titles: 0
- Highest ranking: No. 647 (25 July 2005)

Dominika Nociarová (born 13 April 1984) is a former professional tennis player from Slovakia.

== Biography ==
Nociarová, a right-handed player from Banská Bystrica, had a highest junior ranking of 29 and made the quarterfinals of the Orange Bowl in 2000, as a qualifier.

In 2002, she had her breakthrough year on the pro tour when she won three ITF titles.

She made her only WTA Tour main-draw appearance at the 2004 Budapest Grand Prix as a lucky loser from qualifying and was beaten in the first round by eventual champion, Jelena Jankovic.

At the 2011 Summer Universiade, she represented Slovakia in singles and doubles.

== ITF finals ==
=== Singles: 11 (6–5) ===
$25,000 tournaments
$10,000 tournaments

Result	No.	Date	Tournament	Surface	Opponent	Score
Win	1.	9 June 2002	ITF Staré Splavy, Czech Republic	Clay	(Slovakia) Zuzana Zemenová	5–7, 7–5, 6–0
Win	2.	28 July 2002	ITF Gardone Val Trompia, Italy	Clay	(Romania) Oana Elena Golimbioschi	6–0, 6–3
Win	3.	9 September 2002	ITF Prešov, Slovakia	Clay	(Czech Republic) Gabriela Navrátilová	6–3, 7–5
Win	4.	8 June 2003	ITF Staré Splavy, Czech Republic	Clay	(Bulgaria) Antoaneta Pandjerova	6–2, 6–3
Loss	1.	1 June 2005	ITF Warsaw, Poland	Clay	(Russia) Yaroslava Shvedova	2–6, 6–7^{(6)}
Loss	2.	18 June 2005	ITF Les Contamines, France	Hard	(France) Julie Coin	7–6^{(5)}, 2–6, 4–6
Win	5.	23 September 2007	ITF Bratislava, Slovakia	Clay	(Italy) Valentina Sulpizio	7–5, 6–2
Win	6.	10 February 2008	ITF Vale Do Lobo, Portugal	Hard	(Russia) Elena Chalova	6–2, 6–0
Loss	3.	17 February 2008	ITF Albufeira, Portugal	Hard	(Spain) Sara del Barrio Aragón	6–0, 3–6, 4–6
Loss	4.	30 June 2008	Bella Cup, Poland	Clay	(Belarus) Ekaterina Dzehalevich	3–6, 6–2, 6–7^{(7)}
Loss	5.	28 September 2008	Royal Cup, Montenegro	Clay	(Slovenia) Maša Zec Peškirič	3–6, 6–7^{(1)}
