= Shannon Golds =

Australian tennis player (born 1986)

- Country (sports): Australia
- Residence: Gold Coast, Australia
- Born: 3 October 1986 (age 38); Gold Coast, Australia
- Height: 1.65 m (5 ft 5 in)
- Turned pro: 2005
- Retired: 2016
- Plays: Right-handed (two-handed backhand)
- Prize money: US$67,786

Singles
- Career record: 106–89
- Career titles: 0 WTA, 2 ITF
- Highest ranking: 203 (10 May 2010)

Grand Slam singles results
- Australian Open: Q1 (2009, 2010)
- French Open: Q1 (2010)
- Wimbledon: Q2 (2010)

Doubles
- Career record: 54–66
- Career titles: 0 WTA, 6 ITF
- Highest ranking: 202 (7 December 2009)

Grand Slam doubles results
- Australian Open: 1R (2009, 2010)

Shannon Golds (born 3 October 1986 in Gold Coast) is an Australian retired professional tennis player.

Golds has a career high WTA singles ranking of 203, achieved on 10 May 2010. Golds also has a career high WTA doubles ranking of 202 achieved on 7 December 2009. Golds has won 2 ITF singles titles and 6 ITF doubles titles.

Golds retired from tennis 2016.

== ITF finals (8–3) ==
=== Singles (2–1) ===
Legend $100,000 tournaments $75,000 tournaments $50,000 tournaments $25,000 tournaments $10,000 tournaments	Finals by surface Hard (2–1) Clay (0–0) Grass (0–0) Carpet (0–0)

Outcome	No.	Date	Tournament	Surface	Opponent	Score
Winner	1.	10 September 2006	Hope Island, Australia	Hard	(Australia) Adriana Szili	6–2, 6–2
Runner-up	1.	1 June 2009	Gimhae, South Korea	Hard	(China) Han Xinyun	1–6, 3–6
Winner	2.	20 June 2009	Alcobaça, Portugal	Hard	(Spain) Cristina Sanchez-Quintanar	7–5, 6–1

=== Doubles (6–2) ===
Legend $100,000 tournaments $75,000 tournaments $50,000 tournaments $25,000 tournaments $10,000 tournaments	Finals by surface Hard (5–0) Clay (1–0) Grass (0–2) Carpet (0–0)

Outcome	No.	Date	Tournament	Surface	Partner	Opponents	Score
Winner	1.	10 September 2006	Hope Island, Australia	Hard	(Australia) Lucia Gonzalez	(New Zealand) Shona Lee (Australia) Karolina Wlodarczak	6–4, 7–6^{(7–2)}
Runner-up	1.	11 February 2008	Berri, Australia	Grass	(Australia) Emelyn Starr	(New Zealand) Marina Erakovic (Australia) Nicole Kriz	6–2, 6–7^{(2–7)}, [3–10]
Winner	2.	5 December 2008	Sorrento, Australia	Hard	(Australia) Tyra Calderwood	(United Kingdom) Jade Curtis (Hong Kong) Zhang Ling	6–4, 3–6, [10–8]
Runner-up	2.	4 May 2009	Ipswich, Australia	Grass	(Australia) Tyra Calderwood	(Japan) Maki Arai (Australia) Olivia Rogowska	3–6, 2–6
Winner	3.	20 June 2009	Alcobaça, Portugal	Hard	(Australia) Tammi Patterson	(South Africa) Monica Gorny (United Kingdom) Jade Windley	3–6, 6–2, [10–4]
Winner	4.	10 August 2009	Koksijde, Belgium	Clay	(Australia) Nicole Kriz	(Sweden) Johanna Larsson (United Kingdom) Anna Smith	7–6^{(7–3)}, 6–2
Winner	5.	16 November 2009	Esperance, Australia	Hard	(Australia) Olivia Rogowska	(Australia) Isabella Holland (Australia) Sally Peers	6–1, 6–1
Winner	6.	23 November 2009	Kalgoorlie, Australia	Hard	(Australia) Hayley Ericksen	(Australia) Marija Mirkovic (Australia) Sally Peers	6–3, 4–6, [10–7]
