= Alexis Prousis =

American tennis player

- Full name: Alexis Demetrea Prousis
- Country (sports): United States
- Born: 27 September 1984 (age 40)
- Plays: Right-handed
- Prize money: $23,021

Singles
- Career record: 41–32
- Highest ranking: No. 285 (April 6, 2009)

Doubles
- Career record: 32–33
- Highest ranking: No. 273 (April 27, 2009)

Grand Slam doubles results
- US Open: 1R (2006)

Alexis Demetrea Prousis (born 27 September 1984) is an American former professional tennis player.

An Illinois local, Prousis played collegiate tennis for Northwestern University between 2003 and 2007. A two-time All-American, she won the NCAA doubles championship in 2006, partnering Cristelle Grier. The pair were just the second in history from a Big Ten Conference team to win an NCAA title.

Prousis featured in the women's doubles main draw at the 2006 US Open and competed briefly on the professional tour after leaving college. She reached a career high singles ranking of 285 and won an ITF title in Los Mochis in 2008.

== ITF finals ==
Legend
$25,000 tournaments
$10,000 tournaments

=== Singles: 1 (1–0) ===
Outcome	Date	Tournament	Surface	Opponent	Score
Winner	April 13, 2008	Los Mochis, Mexico	Clay	(United States) Nataly Yoo	7–6^{(5)}, 7–5

=== Doubles: 4 (1–3) ===
Outcome	No.	Date	Tournament	Surface	Partner	Opponents	Score
Runner-up	1.	July 22, 2007	Frinton-on-Sea, United Kingdom	Grass	(United Kingdom) Samantha Murray	(United Kingdom) Rebecca Llewellyn (United Kingdom) Elizabeth Thomas	6–3, 5–7, 2–6
Runner-up	2.	December 2, 2007	La Vall d'Uixó, Spain	Clay	(Spain) Lucía Sainz	(Netherlands) Chayenne Ewijk (Netherlands) Marlot Meddens	4–6, 4–6
Runner-up	3.	September 21, 2008	Kawana, Australia	Hard	(United States) Robin Stephenson	(United Kingdom) Jocelyn Rae (Australia) Emelyn Starr	4–6, 6–4, [4–10]
Winner	1.	November 30, 2008	Perth, Australia	Hard	(United States) Robin Stephenson	(United Kingdom) Jade Curtis (Chinese Taipei) Hwang I-hsuan	7–6^{(7–5)}, 7–6^{(7–4)}
