= Anastasia Malhotra =

Japanese tennis player (born 1989)

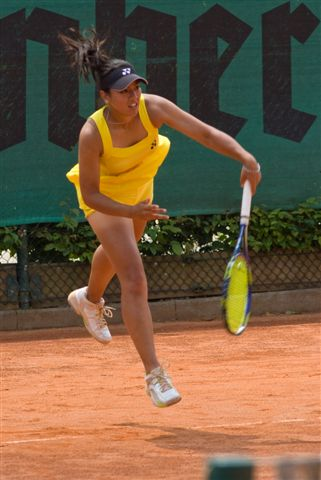
- Malhotra at the TC Blau-Wiess 2010
- Native name: アナスタシア・マルフォートラ
- Country (sports): Japan
- Born: December 12, 1989 (age 36) Gifu, Japan
- Turned pro: 2005
- Plays: Left-handed (two-handed backhand)
- Prize money: US$106,180

Singles
- Career record: 68–68
- Career titles: 0
- Highest ranking: No. 449 (May 11, 2009)

Grand Slam singles results
- Australian Open: –
- French Open: –
- Wimbledon: –
- US Open: –

Doubles
- Career record: 8–20
- Career titles: 0
- Highest ranking: No. 835 (July 26, 2010)
- Last updated on: August 27, 2012.

Anastasia Malhotra (アナスタシア・マルフォートラ, Anasutashia Maruhōtora; born 12 December 1989 in Gifu) is a Japanese professional tennis player.

== Biography ==
Malhotra was born in Gifu, Japan to a Japanese mother and an Indian father. Her paternal grandmother was from Greece and her paternal grandfather was from India. She moved to the United Kingdom when she was 3 and stayed in the country for 8 years.

Coached by her father (and former pro tennis player), she made her professional debut in October 2005. She became part of the Yonex advisory staff in 2009.

She was the team member of TC Blau-Weiss (Germany) in 2010, before getting injured in an exhibition match in Germany in November 2010.

She has done part-time commercial modeling and starred in numerous TV shows in Japan whilst being managed by Horipro Talent Agency.

She also became part of the organization "UYOI" (United Youth of India) in 2009.
