= Paula Fondevila Castro =

Spanish tennis player (born 1984)

- Country (sports): Spain
- Born: 16 May 1984 (age 41)
- Plays: Right (two-handed backhand)
- Prize money: $49,281

Singles
- Career record: 164–140
- Career titles: 1 ITF
- Highest ranking: No. 303 (13 July 2009)

Doubles
- Career record: 30–33
- Career titles: 2 ITF
- Highest ranking: No. 299 (3 August 2009)

Paula Fondevila Castro (Spanish pronunciation: [ˈpawla fondeˈβila ˈkastɾo]; born 16 May 1984) is a Spanish former tennis player.

Fondevila Castro has career-high WTA rankings of 303 in singles, achieved in July 2009, and 299 in doubles, reached in August 2009. In her career, she won one singles title and two doubles titles on the ITF Circuit.

Fondevila Castro made her WTA Tour main-draw debut at the 2009 Morocco Open. In October 2009, she played her last professional match on the ITF Circuit.

== ITF finals ==
=== Singles (1–3) ===
Legend $25,000 tournaments $10,000 tournaments	Finals by surface Hard (1–1) Clay (0–2)

Result	Date	Tier	Tournament	Surface	Opponent	Score
Loss	23 August 2005	10,000	ITF Amarante, Portugal	Hard	(Slovakia) Dominika Cibulková	0–6, 2–6
Loss	17 September 2006	10,000	ITF Lleida, Spain	Clay	(Portugal) Neuza Silva	7–5, 2–6, 6–7^{(2)}
Loss	18 May 2009	10,000	ITF Telde, Spain	Clay	(Germany) Nicola Geuer	7–5, 4–6, 4–6
Win	23 August 2009	10,000	ITF Trecastagni, Italy	Hard	(Italy) Nicole Clerico	6–4, 7–5

=== Doubles (2–2) ===
Legend $25,000 tournaments $10,000 tournaments	Finals by surface Hard (1–1) Clay (1–1)

Result	Date	Tier	Tournament	Surface	Partner	Opponents	Score
Win	5 August 2008	25,000	ITF Coimbra, Portugal	Clay	(Spain) Lucía Sainz	(Slovakia) Martina Babáková (Poland) Olga Brózda	7–6^{(2)}, 6–0
Loss	26 January 2010	25,000	ITF Tenerife, Spain	Clay	(France) Laura Thorpe	(China) Sun Shengnan (China) Zhang Shuai	1–6, 2–6
Win	25 July 2009	25,000	ITF Valladolid, Spain	Hard	(Canada) Heidi El Tabakh	(Spain) Estrella Cabeza Candela (Spain) Sara del Barrio Aragón	6–2, 6–4
Loss	17 August 2009	10,000	ITF Trecastagni, Italy	Hard	(Spain) Lucia Cervera Vazquez	(Italy) Alice Balducci (Italy) Giulia Gasparri	5–7, 6–4, [8–10]
