= Emelyn Starr =

Australian tennis player

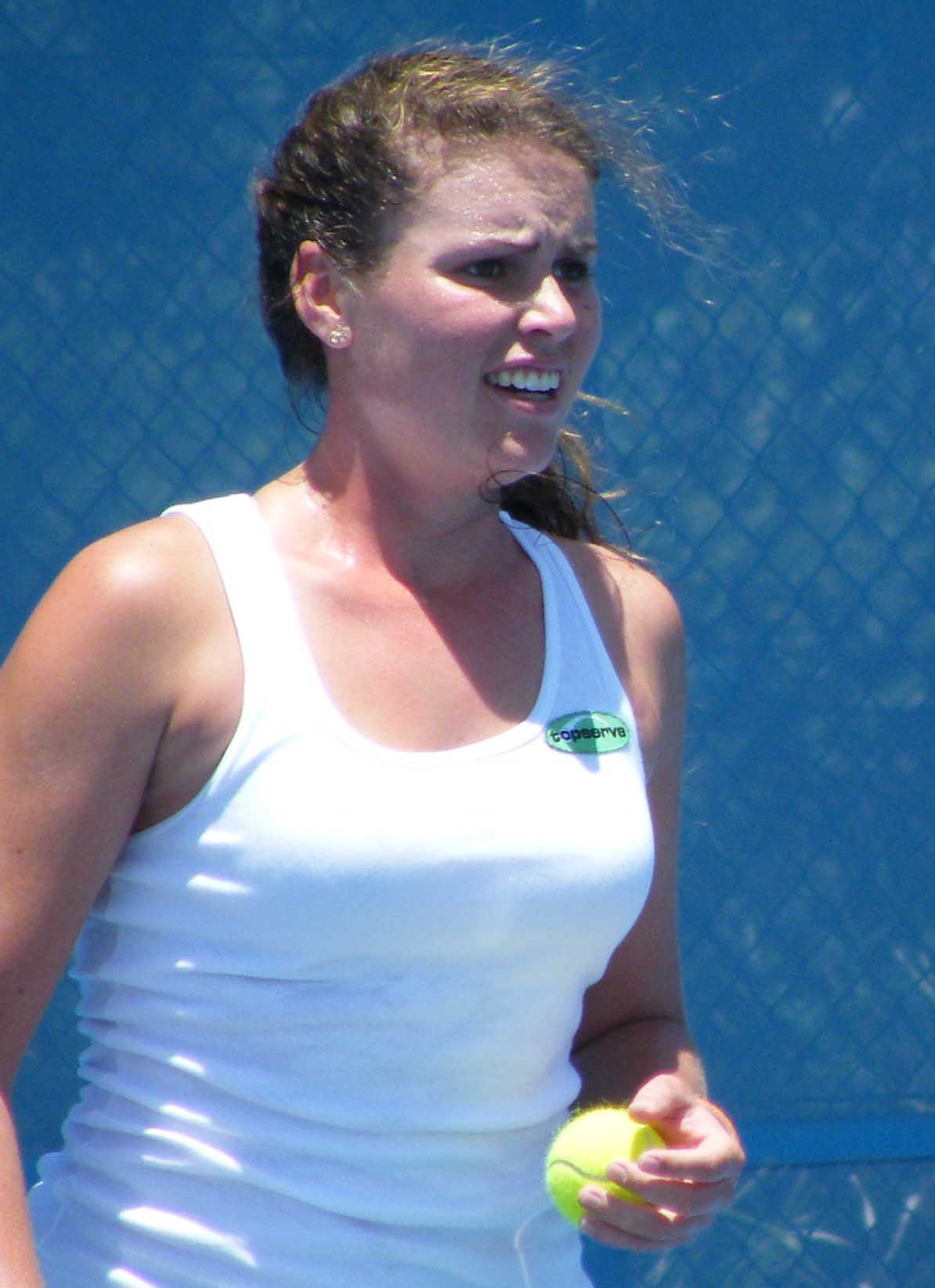
- Country (sports): Australia
- Residence: Tamworth, Australia
- Born: 11 November 1989 (age 35); Grafton, Australia
- Turned pro: 2007
- Plays: Right-handed (two-handed backhand)
- Prize money: US$ 44,935

Singles
- Career record: 80–97
- Career titles: 0
- Highest ranking: No. 370 (3 August 2009)

Grand Slam singles results
- Australian Open: Q1 (2009)

Doubles
- Career record: 77–87
- Career titles: 4 ITF
- Highest ranking: No. 246 (4 October 2010)

Emelyn Starr (born 11 November 1989) is an Australian former professional tennis player.

Her highest singles ranking is world No. 370, which she reached on 3 August 2009. Her career-high WTA ranking in doubles is No. 246, which she achieved on 4 October 2010.

== ITF Circuit finals ==
=== Doubles (4–8) ===
Legend $100,000 tournaments $75,000 tournaments $50,000 tournaments $25,000 tournaments $10,000 tournaments	Finals by surface Hard (2–5) Clay (1–1) Grass (1–2) Carpet (0–0)

Result	No.	Date	Tournament	Surface	Partner	Opponents	Score
Loss	1.	6 March 2007	ITF Hamilton, New Zealand	Hard	(Australia) Jenny Swift	(South Korea) Lee Ye-ra (Japan) Mari Tanaka	2–6, 4–6
Loss	2.	11 February 2008	ITF Berri, Australia	Grass	(Australia) Shannon Golds	(New Zealand) Marina Erakovic (Australia) Nicole Kriz	6–2, 6–7^{(2)}, [3–10]
Loss	3.	3 March 2008	ITF Hamilton, New Zealand	Hard	(Australia) Alison Bai	(Japan) Maki Arai (Japan) Yurina Koshino	6–7, 6–7
Win	1.	14 July 2008	ITF Frinton, United Kingdom	Grass	(Australia) Tammi Patterson	(United Kingdom) Jade Curtis (United Kingdom) Elizabeth Thomas	6–3, 7–5
Win	2.	15 September 2008	ITF Kawana, Australia	Hard	(United Kingdom) Jocelyn Rae	(United States) Alexis Prousis (United States) Robin Stephenson	6–4, 4–6, [10–4]
Loss	4.	14 July 2009	ITF Frinton, United Kingdom	Grass	(United Kingdom) Anna Fitzpatrick	(United Kingdom) Jocelyn Rae (United Kingdom) Jade Windley	3–6, 5–7
Loss	5.	30 November 2009	Bendigo International, Australia	Hard	(United Kingdom) Jocelyn Rae	(France) Irina Pavlovic (Russia) Arina Rodionova	3–6, 6–7^{(3)}
Loss	6.	7 May 2010	ITF Bundaberg, Australia	Clay	(Australia) Viktorija Rajicic	(Australia) Marija Mirkovic (Australia) Jessica Moore	3–6, 6–1, [7–10]
Win	3.	21 June 2010	ITF Davos, Switzerland	Clay	(United Kingdom) Amanda Elliott	(Switzerland) Sarah Moundir (Switzerland) Amra Sadiković	6–1, 6–2
Loss	7.	17 July 2010	ITF Woking, United Kingdom	Hard	(United Kingdom) Jocelyn Rae	(Hungary) Tímea Babos (Finland) Emma Laine	2–6, 2–6
Win	4.	31 July 2010	ITF Chiswick, United Kingdom	Hard	(United Kingdom) Jocelyn Rae	(United Kingdom) Anna Fitzpatrick (United Kingdom) Jade Windley	6–1, 6–4
Loss	8.	20 September 2010	ITF Alice Springs, Australia	Hard	(Australia) Alison Bai	(Japan) Erika Sema (Japan) Yurika Sema	5–7, 1–6
