= Marija Mirkovic =

Australian tennis player

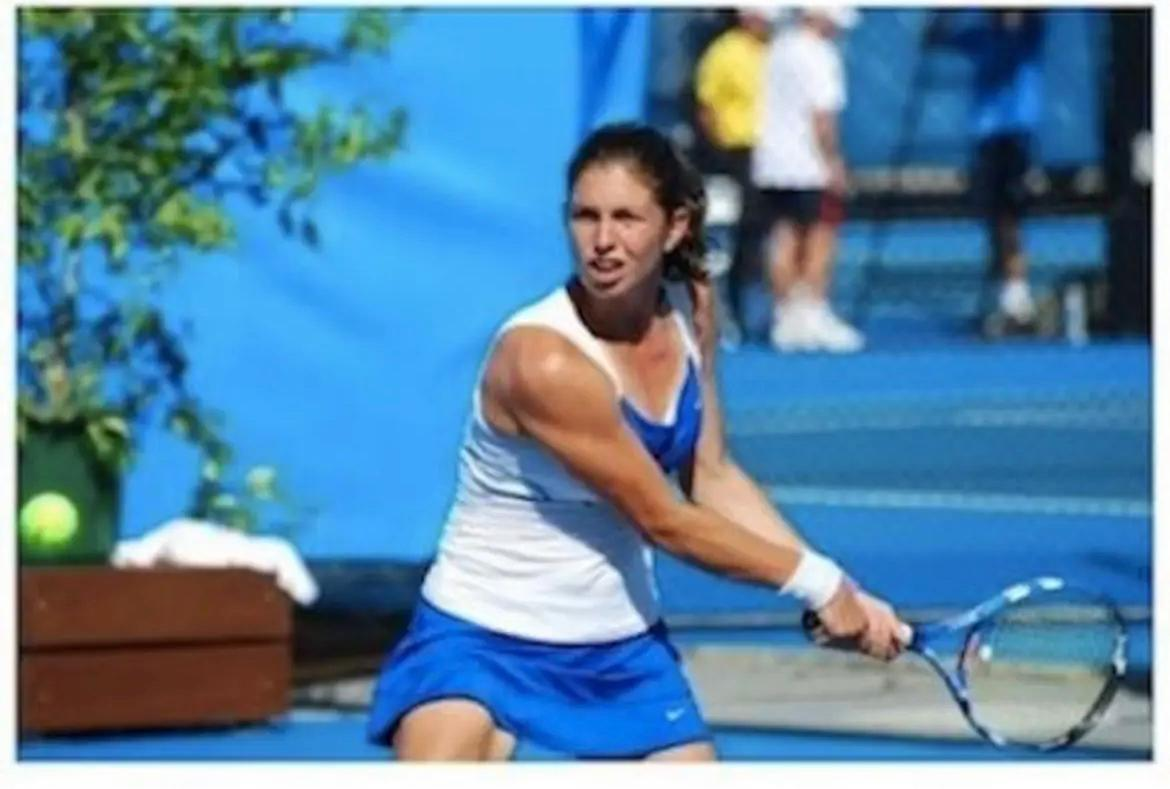
- Country (sports): Australia
- Residence: Hillside, Victoria, Australia
- Born: 23 February 1990 (age 35); Belgrade, SR Serbia, SFR Yugoslavia
- Plays: Right-handed (two-handed backhand)
- Prize money: US$ 61,887

Singles
- Career record: 84–98
- Career titles: 0
- Highest ranking: No. 276 (6 July 2009)

Grand Slam singles results
- Australian Open: Q3 (2009)

Doubles
- Career record: 49–60
- Career titles: 2 ITF
- Highest ranking: No. 221 (22 November 2010)

Grand Slam doubles results
- Australian Open: 1R (2008)

Marija Mirkovic (Serbian: Марија Мирковић, romanized: Marija Mirković; born 23 February 1990) is a former professional Australian tennis player.

Her highest WTA singles ranking is 276, which she reached on 6 July 2009. Her career-high in doubles was at 221 on 22 November 2010.

== ITF Circuit finals ==
Legend
$50,000 tournaments
$25,000 tournaments
$10,000 tournaments

=== Singles (0–2) ===
Result	No.	Date	Tournament	Surface	Opponent	Score
Loss	1.	25 February 2008	ITF Wellington, New Zealand	Hard	(Sweden) Michaela Johansson	0–6, 5–7
Loss	2.	27 July 2008	ITF Hunedoara, Romania	Clay	(Romania) Diana Buzean	2–6, 6–4, 1–6

=== Doubles (2–2) ===
Result	No.	Date	Tournament	Surface	Partner	Opponents	Score
Loss	1.	23 November 2009	ITF Kalgoorlie, Australia	Hard	(Australia) Sally Peers	(Australia) Shannon Golds (Australia) Hayley Ericksen	3–6, 6–4, [7–10]
Win	1.	3 May 2010	ITF Bundaberg, Australia	Clay	(Australia) Jessica Moore	(Australia) Viktorija Rajicic (Australia) Emelyn Starr	6–3, 1–6, 10–7
Win	2.	2 July 2010	ITF Toruń, Poland	Clay	(Serbia) Teodora Mirčić	(Poland) Katarzyna Piter (Poland) Barbara Sobaszkiewicz	4–6, 6–2, [10–5]
Loss	2.	6 August 2010	ITF Moscow, Russia	Clay	(Serbia) Teodora Mirčić	(Russia) Nadejda Guskova (Russia) Valeria Solovyeva	6–7^{(5)}, 3–6
