= Sara del Barrio Aragón =

Spanish tennis player (born 1987)

- Country (sports): Spain
- Born: 14 April 1987 (age 38)
- Plays: Right-handed (two-handed backhand)
- Prize money: $46,194

Singles
- Career record: 125–114
- Career titles: 5 ITF
- Highest ranking: No. 309 (11 August 2008)

Doubles
- Career record: 47–61
- Career titles: 1 ITF
- Highest ranking: No. 278 (10 August 2009)

Sara del Barrio Aragón (Spanish pronunciation: [ˈsaɾa ðel ˈβarjo aɾaˈɣon]; (Note: In isolation, Del Barrio is pronounced [del ˈβarjo].) born 10 April 1987) is a Spanish former tennis player.

Del Barrio Aragón has a career-high singles ranking by the Women's Tennis Association (WTA) of 309, achieved on 11 August 2008. She also has a career-high WTA doubles ranking of 278, achieved on 10 August 2009. Del Barrio Aragón won five singles titles and one doubles title on the ITF Women's Circuit in her career.

She made her WTA Tour main-draw debut at the 2009 Copa Colsanitas in the doubles event, partnering Estrella Cabeza Candela.

== ITF finals ==
=== Singles (5–0) ===
Legend $25,000 tournaments $10,000 tournaments	Finals by surface Hard (4–0) Clay (1–0)

Outcome	No.	Date	Tournament	Surface	Opponent	Score
Winner	1.	23 May 2005	La Palma, Spain	Hard	(Spain) Teresa Ferrer	6–1, 5–7, 6–3
Winner	2.	25 July 2006	A Coruña, Spain	Hard	(Portugal) Ana Catarina Nogueira	6–3, 7–6^{(7–4)}
Winner	3.	28 August 2007	Mollerussa, Spain	Hard	(Spain) Leticia Costas	6–0, 6–3
Winner	4.	11 February 2008	Albufeira, Portugal	Hard	(Slovakia) Dominika Nociarová	0–6, 6–3, 6–4
Winner	5.	2 March 2008	Sant Boi, Spain	Clay	(Argentina) Mailen Auroux	7–5, 7–5

=== Doubles (1–5) ===
Legend $25,000 tournaments $10,000 tournaments	Finals by surface Hard (0–2) Clay (1–3)

Outcome	No.	Date	Tournament	Surface	Partner	Opponents	Score
Runner-up	1.	26 February 2006	Melilla, Spain	Hard	(Spain) Sabrina Méndez Domínguez	(China) Liu Wanting (China) Sun Shengnan	4–6, 0–6
Runner-up	2.	23 June 2008	Getxo, Spain	Clay	(Spain) Estrella Cabeza Candela	(France) Julie Coin (United States) Story Tweedie-Yates	3–6, 1–6
Runner-up	3.	18 October 2008	Mexico City	Hard	(Portugal) Frederica Piedade	(Argentina) Jorgelina Cravero (Argentina) Veronica Spiegel	4–6, 5–7
Runner-up	4.	25 May 2009	Tortosa, Spain	Clay	(Spain) Cristina Sanchez-Quintanar	(Spain) Yera Campos Molina (Spain) Leticia Costas	3–6, 1–6
Runner-up	5.	25 July 2009	Valladolid, Spain	Clay	(Spain) Estrella Cabeza Candela	(Canada) Heidi El Tabakh (Spain) Paula Fondevila Castro	2–6, 4–6
Winner	1.	19 October 2009	Sevilla, Spain	Clay	(Netherlands) Nicolette van Uitert	(Netherlands) Kim Kilsdonk (Netherlands) Marcella Koek	6–3, 6–4
