= Zuzana Zemenová =

Slovak tennis player

- Country (sports): Slovakia
- Born: 5 September 1984 (age 41) Gelnica, Czechoslovakia
- Plays: Right-handed
- College: Baylor Bears and Lady Bears
- Prize money: $28,746

Singles
- Career record: 99–55
- Career titles: 6 ITF
- Highest ranking: No. 413 (11 October 2004)

Doubles
- Career record: 51–29
- Career titles: 7 ITF
- Highest ranking: No. 308 (13 October 2003)

Zuzana Zemenová (born 5 September 1984) is a former professional tennis player from Slovakia.

Born in Gelnica (to parents Marian and Anna), Zemenová won six singles titles and seven doubles titles (all of them on clay court) on the ITF Women's Circuit.

In 2004, she continued her career as a collegiate player for Baylor University in the United States. She decided to follow the college route and was part of the Baylor Bears and Lady Bears tennis team from 2004 to 2008. She reached the finals of the NCAA Division I Women's Tennis Championship in the 2005 singles category, and won the event, defeating Audra Cohen.

She was named the winner of the Honda Sports Award as the nation's best collegiate female tennis player in 2005.
