= 2013 ITF Women's Circuit =

Women's professional tennis tour

Details
- Duration: 31 December 2012 – 29 December 2013

Achievements (singles)

The 2013 ITF Women's Circuit is the 2013 edition of the second-tier tour for women's professional tennis. It is organised by the International Tennis Federation and is a tier below the WTA Tour. The ITF Women's Circuit includes tournaments with prize money ranging from $10,000 up to $100,000.

== Retired players ==
Player	Born	Highest ranking		ITF titles	
Player	Born	Singles	Doubles	Singles	Doubles
(Argentina) Andrea Benítez	10 May 1986	251	269	11	26
(Spain) Leticia Costas	22 March 1990	179	170	1	7
(Italy) Evelyn Mayr	12 May 1989	301	247	7	7
(Italy) Julia Mayr	12 August 1991	215	225	8	12
(Japan) Erika Takao	12 October 1987	128	270	4	2

== Statistical information ==
To avoid confusion and double counting, these tables should only be updated after the end of the week.

=== Key ===
$100,000 tournaments
$75,000 tournaments
$50,000 tournaments
$25,000 tournaments
$15,000 tournaments
$10,000 tournaments
All titles

=== Titles won by player ===
As of September 16.

Total	Player	$100K		$75K		$50K		$25K		$15K		$10K		Total	
Total	Player	S	D	S	D	S	D	S	D	S	D	S	D	S	D
11	Réka-Luca Jani (HUN)							1	1	1		6	2	8	3
9	Renata Voráčová (CZE)		2		2			1	4					1	8
9	Eugeniya Pashkova (RUS)								1			1	7	1	8
8	Anna Morgina (RUS)											4	4	4	4
8	Anastasiya Vasylyeva (UKR)							1	2			1	4	3	5
7	Deniz Khazaniuk (ISR)											6	1	6	1
7	Carla Forte (BRA)											1	6	1	6
7	Polina Leykina (RUS)												7	0	7
6	Stephanie Vogt (LIE)	1					1	1	1	1		1		4	2
6	Tara Moore (GBR)							1	2			2	1	3	3
6	Anett Kontaveit (EST)							1	1			2	2	3	3
6	Aliaksandra Sasnovich (BLR)							1	1			2	2	3	3
6	Viktorija Golubic (SUI)							1				2	3	3	3
6	Ksenia Palkina (KGZ)								1			2	3	2	4
6	Melis Sezer (TUR)								1			2	3	2	4
6	Martina Caregaro (ITA)									1	1	1	3	2	4
6	Tatiana Búa (ARG)								2			1	3	1	5
6	Teodora Mirčić (SRB)								2			1	3	1	5
6	Andrea Benítez (ARG)												6	0	6
5	Jovana Jakšić (SRB)							3				2		5	0
5	Melanie Klaffner (AUT)							3				2		5	0
5	Montserrat González (PAR)											4	1	4	1
5	Laura Siegemund (GER)							3	1				1	3	2
5	Julia Kimmelmann (GER)											3	2	3	2
5	Nadiia Kichenok (UKR)	1	1				2	1						2	3
5	Aleksandra Krunić (SRB)					1	1	1	2					2	3
5	Kristina Barrois (GER)								3	2				2	3
5	Arabela Fernández Rabener (ESP)								1			2	2	2	3
5	Zuzana Zlochová (SVK)											2	3	2	3
5	Peangtarn Plipuech (THA)						1		3			1		1	4
5	Irina Maria Bara (ROU)											1	4	1	4
5	Lucía Cervera Vázquez (ESP)											1	4	1	4
5	Lina Gjorcheska (MKD)											1	4	1	4
5	Yana Sizikova (RUS)											1	4	1	4
5	María Fernanda Álvarez Terán (BOL)								3				2	0	5
5	Daniela Seguel (CHI)								3				2	0	5
5	Albina Khabibulina (UZB)								1				4	0	5
4	Anna-Lena Friedsam (GER)					2	1			1				3	1
4	Clothilde de Bernardi (FRA)										1	3		3	1
4	Bernarda Pera (USA)											3	1	3	1
4	Maryna Zanevska (UKR)		1				1	1				1		2	2
4	Alice Balducci (ITA)						1					2	1	2	2
4	Kateřina Siniaková (CZE)							1	2			1		2	2
4	Viktorija Rajicic (AUS)							1				1	2	2	2
4	Laura-Ioana Andrei (ROU)								1			2	1	2	2
4	Gioia Barbieri (ITA)											2	2	2	2
4	Olga Ianchuk (UKR)											2	2	2	2
4	Hiroko Kuwata (JPN)											2	2	2	2
4	Lu Jiajing (CHN)											2	2	2	2
4	Sharon Fichman (CAN)		1				1	1	1					1	3
4	Alla Kudryavtseva (RUS)				1				1			1	1	1	3
4	Lyudmyla Kichenok (UKR)		1			1			2					1	3
4	Erika Sema (JPN)						2	1	1					1	3
4	Paula Kania (POL)							1	3					1	3
4	Irina Khromacheva (RUS)							1	3					1	3
4	Adriana Pérez (VEN)							1	3					1	3
4	Jeļena Ostapenko (LAT)								2			1	1	1	3
4	Cindy Burger (NED)								1			1	2	1	3
4	Viktoriya Tomova (BUL)								1			1	2	1	3
4	Tereza Malíková (CZE)										1	1	2	1	3
4	Hilda Melander (SWE)										1	1	2	1	3
4	Sowjanya Bavisetti (IND)											1	3	1	3
4	Lee Jin-a (KOR)											1	3	1	3
4	Alexandra Mueller (USA)											1	3	1	3
4	Jade Windley (GBR)											1	3	1	3
4	Yoo Mi (KOR)											1	3	1	3
4	Nicha Lertpitaksinchai (THA)						1		3					0	4
4	Allie Will (USA)						1		3					0	4
4	Oksana Kalashnikova (GEO)						1		1				2	0	4
4	Polina Monova (RUS)								2				2	0	4
4	Melanie South (GBR)								1				3	0	4
4	Vivien Juhászová (SVK)										1		3	0	4
4	Akari Inoue (JPN)												4	0	4
4	Raluca Elena Platon (ROU)												4	0	4
4	Camilla Rosatello (ITA)												4	0	4
3	Ons Jabeur (TUN)					2		1						3	0
3	Dinah Pfizenmaier (GER)					1						2		3	0
3	Yvonne Meusburger (AUT)							3						3	0
3	Teliana Pereira (BRA)							3						3	0
3	Polina Vinogradova (RUS)							1				2		3	0
3	Ana Bogdan (ROU)											3		3	0
3	Valentini Grammatikopoulou (GRE)											3		3	0
3	Bárbara Luz (POR)											3		3	0
3	Ankita Raina (IND)											3		3	0
3	Wang Yafan (CHN)											3		3	0
3	Arantxa Rus (NED)		1					2						2	1
3	Elina Svitolina (UKR)			2	1									2	1
3	Julia Glushko (ISR)					1	1	1						2	1
3	Alison Van Uytvanck (BEL)						1	2						2	1
3	Danka Kovinić (MNE)							2	1					2	1
3	Sachie Ishizu (JPN)							1	1			1		2	1
3	Doroteja Erić (SRB)							1				1	1	2	1
3	Ysaline Bonaventure (BEL)										1	2		2	1
3	Ágnes Bukta (HUN)											2	1	2	1
3	Carolin Daniels (GER)											2	1	2	1
3	Xenia Knoll (SUI)											2	1	2	1
3	Darya Lebesheva (BLR)											2	1	2	1
3	Lee Ye-ra (KOR)											2	1	2	1
3	Adrijana Lekaj (CRO)											2	1	2	1
3	Antonia Lottner (GER)											2	1	2	1
3	Ana Sofía Sánchez (MEX)											2	1	2	1
3	İpek Soylu (TUR)											2	1	2	1
3	Barbora Záhlavová-Strýcová (CZE)		2	1										1	2
3	Zhou Yimiao (CHN)				1				1	1				1	2
3	Varatchaya Wongteanchai (THA)					1	1		1					1	2
3	Vanesa Furlanetto (ARG)						1				1	1		1	2
3	Eri Hozumi (JPN)							1	2					1	2
3	Ksenia Lykina (RUS)							1	2					1	2
3	Diāna Marcinkēviča (LAT)							1	2					1	2
3	Asia Muhammad (USA)							1	2					1	2
3	Ana Vrljić (CRO)							1	2					1	2
3	Maria Fernanda Alves (BRA)								1	1	1			1	2
3	Natela Dzalamidze (RUS)								1			1	1	1	2
3	Kamila Kerimbayeva (KAZ)								1			1	1	1	2
3	Ksenia Kirillova (RUS)								1			1	1	1	2
3	Ellen Allgurin (SWE)											1	2	1	2
3	Giulia Bruzzone (ITA)											1	2	1	2
3	Tamara Čurović (SRB)											1	2	1	2
3	Ayu Fani Damayanti (INA)											1	2	1	2
3	Indy de Vroome (NED)											1	2	1	2
3	Noelle Hickey (USA)											1	2	1	2
3	Anna Klasen (GER)											1	2	1	2
3	Margarita Lazareva (RUS)											1	2	1	2
3	Rebecca Peterson (SWE)											1	2	1	2
3	Mayar Sherif (EGY)											1	2	1	2
3	Lavinia Tananta (INA)											1	2	1	2
3	Ana Veselinović (MNE)											1	2	1	2
3	Ekaterina Yashina (RUS)											1	2	1	2
3	Yuliya Beygelzimer (UKR)		1		1		1							0	3
3	Naomi Broady (GBR)						1		2					0	3
3	Magda Linette (POL)						1		2					0	3
3	Mari Tanaka (JPN)						1		1				1	0	3
3	Nicole Melichar (USA)						1						2	0	3
3	Chan Chin-wei (TPE)								3					0	3
3	Yurika Sema (JPN)								3					0	3
3	Makoto Ninomiya (JPN)								2				1	0	3
3	Anna Shkudun (UKR)								2				1	0	3
3	Keri Wong (USA)								2				1	0	3
3	Barbora Krejčíková (CZE)								1				2	0	3
3	Demi Schuurs (NED)								1				2	0	3
3	Christina Shakovets (GER)								1				2	0	3
3	Anna Floris (ITA)										1		2	0	3
3	Isabella Shinikova (BUL)										1		2	0	3
3	Diana Buzean (ROU)												3	0	3
3	Estelle Cascino (FRA)												3	0	3
3	Anna Fitzpatrick (GBR)												3	0	3
3	Han Na-lae (KOR)												3	0	3
3	Lidziya Marozava (BLR)												3	0	3
3	Despina Papamichail (GRE)												3	0	3
3	Prarthana Thombare (IND)												3	0	3
2	Polona Hercog (SLO)	1						1						2	0
2	Johanna Konta (GBR)	1						1						2	0
2	Shelby Rogers (USA)					2								2	0
2	Mariana Duque Mariño (COL)					1		1						2	0
2	Mayo Hibi (JPN)					1		1						2	0
2	Kristína Kučová (SVK)					1		1						2	0
2	Madison Brengle (USA)							2						2	0
2	Tadeja Majerič (SLO)							2						2	0
2	Risa Ozaki (JPN)							2						2	0
2	Jelena Pandžić (CRO)							1		1				2	0
2	Barbara Bonić (SRB)							1				1		2	0
2	Cristina Dinu (ROU)							1				1		2	0
2	Sabina Sharipova (UZB)							1				1		2	0
2	Petra Uberalová (SVK)							1				1		2	0
2	Maša Zec Peškirič (SLO)							1				1		2	0
2	Fatma Al-Nabhani (OMA)											2		2	0
2	Karen Barbat (DEN)											2		2	0
2	Beatriz Haddad Maia (BRA)											2		2	0
2	Miyabi Inoue (JPN)											2		2	0
2	Sofiya Kovalets (UKR)											2		2	0
2	Lee Pei-chi (TPE)											2		2	0
2	Lara Michel (SUI)											2		2	0
2	Paula Ormaechea (ARG)					1	1							1	1
2	Timea Bacsinszky (SUI)					1							1	1	1
2	Luksika Kumkhum (THA)						1	1						1	1
2	Storm Sanders (AUS)						1	1						1	1
2	Paula Cristina Gonçalves (BRA)							1	1					1	1
2	Nao Hibino (JPN)							1	1					1	1
2	María Irigoyen (ARG)							1	1					1	1
2	Victoria Kan (RUS)							1	1					1	1
2	Ilona Kremen (BLR)							1	1					1	1
2	Olivia Rogowska (AUS)							1	1					1	1
2	Shiho Akita (JPN)								1			1		1	1
2	Cecilia Costa Melgar (CHI)								1			1		1	1
2	Lauren Embree (USA)								1			1		1	1
2	Michaela Hončová (SVK)								1			1		1	1
2	Allie Kiick (USA)								1			1		1	1
2	Marcela Zacarías (MEX)								1			1		1	1
2	Han Xinyun (CHN)									1	1			1	1
2	Lena-Marie Hofmann (GER)									1			1	1	1
2	Emina Bektas (USA)											1	1	1	1
2	Başak Eraydın (TUR)											1	1	1	1
2	Claudia Giovine (ITA)											1	1	1	1
2	Anastasia Grymalska (ITA)											1	1	1	1
2	Bianca Hîncu (ROU)											1	1	1	1
2	Michaëlla Krajicek (NED)											1	1	1	1
2	Elise Mertens (BEL)											1	1	1	1
2	Alina Mikheeva (RUS)											1	1	1	1
2	Guadalupe Moreno (ARG)											1	1	1	1
2	Emi Mutaguchi (JPN)											1	1	1	1
2	Raluca Olaru (ROU)											1	1	1	1
2	Jasmine Paolini (ITA)											1	1	1	1
2	Daria Salnikova (RUS)											1	1	1	1
2	Gaia Sanesi (ITA)											1	1	1	1
2	Anne Schäfer (GER)											1	1	1	1
2	Milana Špremo (SRB)											1	1	1	1
2	Rebecca Šramková (SVK)											1	1	1	1
2	Giulia Sussarello (ITA)											1	1	1	1
2	Tian Ran (CHN)											1	1	1	1
2	Nicolette van Uitert (NED)											1	1	1	1
2	Despoina Vogasari (GRE)											1	1	1	1
2	Julia Wachaczyk (GER)											1	1	1	1
2	Vladyslava Zanosiyenko (UKR)											1	1	1	1
2	Olga Savchuk (UKR)		1						1					0	2
2	Nicola Slater (GBR)				1		1							0	2
2	Liu Chang (CHN)				1				1					0	2
2	Jan Abaza (USA)						2							0	2
2	Gabriela Dabrowski (CAN)						1		1					0	2
2	Kanae Hisami (JPN)						1		1					0	2
2	Miki Miyamura (JPN)						1		1					0	2
2	Laura Thorpe (FRA)						1		1					0	2
2	Amandine Hesse (FRA)						1						1	0	2
2	Katarzyna Kawa (POL)						1						1	0	2
2	Veronika Kudermetova (RUS)						1						1	0	2
2	Monique Adamczak (AUS)								2					0	2
2	Ashleigh Barty (AUS)								2					0	2
2	Verónica Cepede Royg (PAR)								2					0	2
2	Margarita Gasparyan (RUS)								2					0	2
2	Akiko Omae (JPN)								2					0	2
2	Katarzyna Piter (POL)								2					0	2
2	Nicole Clerico (ITA)								1		1			0	2
2	Vladica Babić (MNE)								1				1	0	2
2	Olga Doroshina (RUS)								1				1	0	2
2	Dia Evtimova (BUL)								1				1	0	2
2	Nikola Fraňková (CZE)								1				1	0	2
2	Alyona Sotnikova (UKR)								1				1	0	2
2	Eva Wacanno (NED)								1				1	0	2
2	Carolina Betancourt (MEX)										1		1	0	2
2	Tomoko Dokei (JPN)										1		1	0	2
2	Cornelia Lister (SWE)										1		1	0	2
2	Mana Ayukawa (JPN)												2	0	2
2	Sharmada Balu (IND)												2	0	2
2	Vera Bessonova (RUS)												2	0	2
2	Elena-Teodora Cadar (ROU)												2	0	2
2	Leticia Costas (ESP)												2	0	2
2	Ilka Csöregi (ROU)												2	0	2
2	Kristy Frilling (USA)												2	0	2
2	Lindsey Hardenbergh (USA)												2	0	2
2	Macall Harkins (USA)												2	0	2
2	Kang Seo-kyung (KOR)												2	0	2
2	Natalia Kołat (POL)												2	0	2
2	Franziska König (GER)												2	0	2
2	Lenka Kunčíková (CZE)												2	0	2
2	Emma Laine (FIN)												2	0	2
2	Lee Hua-chen (TPE)												2	0	2
2	Lu Jiaxiang (CHN)												2	0	2
2	Lee Or (ISR)												2	0	2
2	Natasha Palha (IND)												2	0	2
2	Sviatlana Pirazhenka (BLR)												2	0	2
2	Zarah Razafimahatratra (MAD)												2	0	2
2	Nathália Rossi (BRA)												2	0	2
2	Alena Tarasova (RUS)												1	0	2
2	Karolína Stuchlá (CZE)												2	0	2
2	Julia Valetova (RUS)												2	0	2
2	Alina Wessel (GER)												2	0	2
2	Dalia Zafirova (BUL)												2	0	2
2	Monique Zuur (NED)												2	0	2
1	Lauren Davis (USA)	1												1	0
1	Caroline Garcia (FRA)	1												1	0
1	Andrea Petkovic (GER)	1												1	0
1	Lucie Šafářová (CZE)	1												1	0
1	Petra Martić (CRO)			1										1	0
1	Zhang Shuai (CHN)			1										1	0
1	Tímea Babos (HUN)					1								1	0
1	Elena Baltacha (GBR)					1								1	0
1	Claire Feuerstein (FRA)					1								1	0
1	Nicole Gibbs (USA)					1								1	0
1	Anne Keothavong (GBR)					1								1	0
1	An-Sophie Mestach (BEL)					1								1	0
1	Kurumi Nara (JPN)					1								1	0
1	Karolína Plíšková (CZE)					1								1	0
1	Petra Rampre (SLO)					1								1	0
1	Chanel Simmonds (RSA)					1								1	0
1	Ajla Tomljanović (CRO)					1								1	0
1	Donna Vekić (CRO)					1								1	0
1	Zhang Yuxuan (CHN)					1								1	0
1	Duan Yingying (CHN)							1						1	0
1	Richèl Hogenkamp (NED)							1						1	0
1	Ana Konjuh (CRO)							1						1	0
1	Elizaveta Kulichkova (RUS)							1						1	0
1	Sanaz Marand (USA)							1						1	0
1	Patricia Mayr-Achleitner (AUT)							1						1	0
1	Florencia Molinero (ARG)							1						1	0
1	Pemra Özgen (TUR)							1						1	0
1	Irena Pavlovic (FRA)							1						1	0
1	Laura Pous Tió (ESP)							1						1	0
1	Anna Karolína Schmiedlová (SVK)							1						1	0
1	Carina Witthöft (GER)							1						1	0
1	Sandra Záhlavová (CZE)							1						1	0
1	Isabella Holland (AUS)									1				1	0
1	Diana Šumová (CZE)									1				1	0
1	Lauren Albanese (USA)											1		1	0
1	Ekaterina Alexandrova (RUS)											1		1	0
1	Denisa Allertová (CZE)											1		1	0
1	Manon Arcangioli (FRA)											1		1	0
1	Marie Benoît (BEL)											1		1	0
1	Aliona Bolsova Zadoinov (ESP)											1		1	0
1	Bianca Botto (PER)											1		1	0
1	Gabriela Cé (BRA)											1		1	0
1	Susanne Celik (SWE)											1		1	0
1	Océane Dodin (FRA)											1		1	0
1	Ana Clara Duarte (BRA)											1		1	0
1	Alexandra Dulgheru (ROU)											1		1	0
1	Eva Fernández Brugués (ESP)											1		1	0
1	Ximena Hermoso (MEX)											1		1	0
1	Inès Ibbou (ALG)											1		1	0
1	Miharu Imanishi (JPN)											1		1	0
1	Katherine Ip (HKG)											1		1	0
1	Ivana Jorović (SRB)											1		1	0
1	Marina Kachar (SRB)											1		1	0
1	Bhuvana Kalva (IND)											1		1	0
1	Karin Kennel (SUI)											1		1	0
1	Déborah Kerfs (BEL)											1		1	0
1	Alisa Kleybanova (RUS)											1		1	0
1	Anastasiya Komardina (RUS)											1		1	0
1	Yana Koroleva (RUS)											1		1	0
1	Andrea Lázaro García (ESP)											1		1	0
1	Lee Ya-hsuan (TPE)											1		1	0
1	Klaartje Liebens (BEL)											1		1	0
1	Jamie Loeb (USA)											1		1	0
1	Alice Matteucci (ITA)											1		1	0
1	Daria Mironova (RUS)											1		1	0
1	Sonja Molnar (CAN)											1		1	0
1	Angelica Moratelli (ITA)											1		1	0
1	Tayisiya Morderger (GER)											1		1	0
1	Brianna Morgan (USA)											1		1	0
1	Lisa-Maria Moser (AUT)											1		1	0
1	Nuria Párrizas Díaz (ESP)											1		1	0
1	Virginie Razzano (FRA)											1		1	0
1	Anastasia Rudakova (RUS)											1		1	0
1	Laëtitia Sarrazin (FRA)											1		1	0
1	Marina Shamayko (RUS)											1		1	0
1	Chantal Škamlová (SVK)											1		1	0
1	Barbora Štefková (CZE)											1		1	0
1	Valeriya Strakhova (UKR)											1		1	0
1	Yuuki Tanaka (JPN)											1		1	0
1	Roxane Vaisemberg (BRA)											1		1	0
1	Zhao Di (CHN)											1		1	0
1	Melinda Czink (HUN)		1											0	1
1	Vania King (USA)		1											0	1
1	Sandra Klemenschits (AUT)		1											0	1
1	Andreja Klepač (SLO)		1											0	1
1	Mirjana Lučić-Baroni (CRO)		1											0	1
1	Mervana Jugić-Salkić (BIH)				1									0	1
1	Maria Sanchez (USA)				1									0	1
1	Ekaterina Bychkova (UKR)						1							0	1
1	Irina Buryachok (RUS)						1							0	1
1	Louisa Chirico (USA)						1							0	1
1	Julia Cohen (USA)						1							0	1
1	Julie Coin (FRA)						1							0	1
1	Irina Falconi (USA)						1							0	1
1	Stéphanie Foretz Gacon (FRA)						1							0	1
1	Valentyna Ivakhnenko (UKR)						1							0	1
1	Raquel Kops-Jones (USA)						1							0	1
1	Kateryna Kozlova (UKR)						1							0	1
1	Tatjana Maria (GER)						1							0	1
1	Junri Namigata (JPN)						1							0	1
1	Evgeniya Rodina (RUS)						1							0	1
1	Sofia Shapatava (GEO)						1							0	1
1	Anna Tatishvili (GEO)						1							0	1
1	Coco Vandeweghe (USA)						1							0	1
1	Abigail Spears (USA)						1							0	1
1	Sun Ziyue (CHN)						1							0	1
1	Xu Shilin (CHN)						1							0	1
1	Robin Anderson (USA)								1					0	1
1	Shuko Aoyama (JPN)								1					0	1
1	Alexandra Artamonova (RUS)								1					0	1
1	Belinda Bencic (SUI)								1					0	1
1	Elena Bogdan (ROU)								1					0	1
1	Martina Borecká (CZE)								1					0	1
1	Samantha Crawford (USA)								1					0	1
1	Anna Danilina (KAZ)								1					0	1
1	Ulrikke Eikeri (NOR)								1					0	1
1	Heidi El Tabakh (CAN)								1					0	1
1	Alona Fomina (UKR)								1					0	1
1	Angelina Gabueva (RUS)								1					0	1
1	Hsu Chieh-yu (USA)								1					0	1
1	Hsu Wen-hsin (TPE)								1					0	1
1	Jang Su-jeong (KOR)								1					0	1
1	Veronika Kapshay (UKR)								1					0	1
1	Magali Kempen (BEL)								1					0	1
1	Maria Kondratieva (RUS)								1					0	1
1	Lee So-ra (KOR)								1					0	1
1	Noppawan Lertcheewakarn (THA)								1					0	1
1	Alizé Lim (FRA)								1					0	1
1	Lena Litvak (USA)								1					0	1
1	Iva Mekovec (CRO)								1					0	1
1	Polina Pekhova (BLR)								1					0	1
1	Ganna Poznikhirenko (UKR)								1					0	1
1	Justine Ozga (GER)								1					0	1
1	Arina Rodionova (RUS)								1					0	1
1	Amra Sadiković (SUI)								1					0	1
1	Marta Sirotkina (RUS)								1					0	1
1	Tereza Smitková (CZE)								1					0	1
1	Lina Stančiūtė (LTU)								1					0	1
1	Sun Shengnan (CHN)								1					0	1
1	Jasmina Tinjić (BIH)								1					0	1
1	Angelique van der Meet (NED)								1					0	1
1	Nicky Van Dyck (BEL)								1					0	1
1	Sachia Vickery (USA)								1					0	1
1	Emily Webley-Smith (GBR)								1					0	1
1	Anna Zaja (GER)								1					0	1
1	Carol Zhao (CAN)								1					0	1
1	Camila Fuentes (MEX)										1			0	1
1	Giulia Gatto-Monticone (ITA)										1			0	1
1	Nicola Geuer (GER)										1			0	1
1	Yurina Koshino (JPN)										1			0	1
1	Petra Krejsová (CZE)										1			0	1
1	Liu Wanting (CHN)										1			0	1
1	Jesika Malečková (CZE)										1			0	1
1	Sandra Roma (SWE)										1			0	1
1	Lisa Whybourn (GBR)										1			0	1
1	Yang Zhaoxuan (CHN)										1			0	1
1	Ye Qiuyu (CHN)										1			0	1
1	Katarina Adamović (SRB)												1	0	1
1	Carolina Alves (BRA)												1	0	1
1	Anna Katalina Alzate Esmurzaeva (NED)												1	0	1
1	Ani Amiraghyan (ARM)												1	0	1
1	Alison Bai (AUS)												1	0	1
1	Agata Barańska (POL)												1	0	1
1	Dide Beijer (NED)												1	0	1
1	Sherazad Benamar (FRA)												1	0	1
1	Anamika Bhargava (USA)												1	0	1
1	Rutuja Bhosale (IND)												1	0	1
1	Diana Bogoliy (UKR)												1	0	1
1	Brooke Bolender (USA)												1	0	1
1	Victoria Bosio (ARG)												1	0	1
1	Kristi Boxx (USA)												1	0	1
1	Lucy Brown (GBR)												1	0	1
1	Olga Brózda (POL)												1	0	1
1	Ema Burgić (BIH)												1	0	1
1	Jacqueline Cabaj Awad (SWE)												1	0	1
1	Tyra Calderwood (AUS)												1	0	1
1	Alessia Camplone (ITA)												1	0	1
1	Yvonne Cavallé Reimers (ESP)												1	0	1
1	Amandine Cazeaux (FRA)												1	0	1
1	Beatrice Cedermark (SWE)												1	0	1
1	Nidhi Chilumula (IND)												1	0	1
1	Kaitlyn Christian (USA)												1	0	1
1	Erin Clark (USA)												1	0	1
1	Nicole Collie (AUS)												1	0	1
1	Jaqueline Cristian (ROU)												1	0	1
1	Leah Daw (AUS)												1	0	1
1	Justine De Sutter (BEL)												1	0	1
1	Martina Di Giuseppe (ITA)												1	0	1
1	Federica Di Sarra (ITA)												1	0	1
1	Pilar Domínguez López (ESP)												1	0	1
1	Misa Eguchi (JPN)												1	0	1
1	Mai El Kamash (EGY)												1	0	1
1	Roxanne Ellison (USA)												1	0	1
1	Sierra Ellison (USA)												1	0	1
1	Michaela Frlicka (GER)												1	0	1
1	Gai Ao (CHN)												1	0	1
1	Andrea Gámiz (VEN)												1	0	1
1	Sara Giménez (PAR)												1	0	1
1	Sultan Gönen (TUR)												1	0	1
1	Kim Grajdek (GER)												1	0	1
1	Chiara Grimm (SUI)												1	0	1
1	Flávia Guimarães Buenos (BRA)												1	0	1
1	Beatrice Gumulya (INA)												1	0	1
1	Abigail Guthrie (NZL)												1	0	1
1	Barbara Haas (AUT)												1	0	1
1	María Fernanda Herazo (COL)												1	0	1
1	Emily Harman (USA)												1	0	1
1	Dianne Hollands (NZL)												1	0	1
1	Hong Seung-yeon (KOR)												1	0	1
1	Nikola Horáková (CZE)												1	0	1
1	Camelia Hristea (ROU)												1	0	1
1	Juan Ting-fei (TPE)												1	0	1
1	Yuliya Kalabina (RUS)												1	0	1
1	Kao Shao-yuan (TPE)												1	0	1
1	Miyu Kato (JPN)												1	0	1
1	Khristina Kazimova (UKR)												1	0	1
1	Anastasia Kharchenko (UKR)												1	0	1
1	Kim Kilsdonk (NED)												1	0	1
1	Kim Ji-young (KOR)												1	0	1
1	Kim Na-ri (KOR)												1	0	1
1	Kim Sun-jung (KOR)												1	0	1
1	Lynn Kiro (RSA)												1	0	1
1	Charlotte Klasen (GER)												1	0	1
1	Nastja Kolar (SLO)												1	0	1
1	Pia Konig (AUT)												1	0	1
1	Oleksandra Korashvili (UKR)												1	0	1
1	Tatiana Kotelnikova (RUS)												1	0	1
1	Kateřina Kramperová (CZE)												1	0	1
1	Madrie Le Roux (RSA)												1	0	1
1	Lee Hye-min (KOR)												1	0	1
1	Katharina Lehnert (PHI)												1	0	1
1	Elke Lemmens (BEL)												1	0	1
1	Li Yihong (CHN)												1	0	1
1	Zuzanna Maciejewska (POL)												1	0	1
1	Giorgia Marchetti (ITA)												1	0	1
1	Ester Masuri (ISR)												1	0	1
1	Marina Melnikova (RUS)												1	0	1
1	Ana Bianca Mihăilă (ROU)												1	0	1
1	Ema Mikulčić (CRO)												1	0	1
1	Danielle Mills (USA)												1	0	1
1	Yuka Mori (JPN)												1	0	1
1	Julia Moriarty (AUS)												1	0	1
1	Ashley Murdock (USA)												1	0	1
1	Samantha Murray (GBR)												1	0	1
1	Chiaki Okadaue (JPN)												1	0	1
1	Kristina Ostojić (SRB)												1	0	1
1	Pauline Payet (FRA)												1	0	1
1	María Paulina Pérez (COL)												1	0	1
1	Stephanie Mariel Petit (ARG)												1	0	1
1	Carolina Petrelli (ITA)												1	0	1
1	Laura Pigossi (BRA)												1	0	1
1	Raquel Piltcher (BRA)												1	0	1
1	Michaela Pochabová (SVK)												1	0	1
1	Valeria Podda (NED)												1	0	1
1	Kady Pooler (USA)												1	0	1
1	Peggy Porter (USA)												1	0	1
1	Linda Prenkovic (GER)												1	0	1
1	Anja Prislan (SLO)												1	0	1
1	Valeria Prosperi (ITA)												1	0	1
1	Dejana Raickovic (GER)												1	0	1
1	Eva Raszkiewicz (USA)												1	0	1
1	Polona Reberšak (SLO)												1	0	1
1	Jessica Ren (GBR)												1	0	1
1	Francesca Rescaldani (ARG)												1	0	1
1	Jessy Rompies (INA)												1	0	1
1	Ioana Loredana Roșca (ROU)												1	0	1
1	Nicole Rottmann (AUT)												1	0	1
1	Daniela Ruiz (BOL)												1	0	1
1	Shaklo Saidova (RUS)												1	0	1
1	Sabrina Santamaria (USA)												1	0	1
1	Alice Savoretti (ITA)												1	0	1
1	Zoë Gwen Scandalis (USA)												1	0	1
1	Daniela Schippers (GUA)												1	0	1
1	Molly Scott (USA)												1	0	1
1	Francesca Segarelli (DOM)												1	0	1
1	Sarah-Rebecca Sekulic (GER)												1	0	1
1	Blair Shankle (USA)												1	0	1
1	Keren Shlomo (ISR)												1	0	1
1	Kyra Shroff (IND)												1	0	1
1	Darya Shulzhanok (BLR)												1	0	1
1	Camila Silva (CHI)												1	0	1
1	Anna Smith (GBR)												1	0	1
1	Nina Stadler (SUI)												1	0	1
1	Julia Stamatova (BUL)												1	0	1
1	Denise Starr (USA)												1	0	1
1	Jasmin Steinherr (GER)												1	0	1
1	Francesca Stephenson (GBR)												1	0	1
1	Veronika Stotyka (UKR)												1	0	1
1	Tess Sugnaux (SUI)												1	0	1
1	Rishika Sunkara (IND)												1	0	1
1	Piia Suomalainen (FIN)												1	0	1
1	Tang Haochen (CHN)												1	0	1
1	Jil Teichmann (SUI)												1	0	1
1	Léa Tholey (FRA)												1	0	1
1	Naomi Totka (HUN)												1	0	1
1	Malin Ulvefeldt (SWE)												1	0	1
1	Gabriela van de Graaf (NED)												1	0	1
1	Kim van der Horst (NED)												1	0	1
1	Leticia Vidal (BRA)												1	0	1
1	Rita Vilaça (POR)												1	0	1
1	Kathinka von Deichmann (LIE)												1	0	1
1	Wen Xin (CHN)												1	0	1
1	Karolina Wlodarczak (AUS)												1	0	1
1	Yang Yi (CHN)												1	0	1
1	Yu Min-hwa (KOR)												1	0	1
1	Sylwia Zagórska (POL)												1	0	1
1	Nina Zander (GER)												1	0	1
1	Carolina Zeballos (ARG)												1	0	1
1	Zhu Aiwen (CHN)												1	0	1

=== Titles won by nation ===
As of September 23.

Total	Nation	$100K		$75K		$50K		$25K		$15K		$10K		Total	
Total	Nation	S	D	S	D	S	D	S	D	S	D	S	D	S	D
86	Russia (RUS)				1		2	7	17			23	36	30	56
61	United States (USA)	1	1	1	2	3	6	4	10			11	22	20	41
53	Germany (GER)	1				3	2	4	5	4	1	12	21	24	29
47	Ukraine (UKR)	1	3	2	2	1	4	4	9			8	13	16	31
44	Japan (JPN)					2	4	8	10		1	8	11	18	26
38	Italy (ITA)						1		1	1	2	13	20	14	24
34	Czech Republic (CZE)	1	2	1	2	1		3	9	1	2	4	8	11	23
31	Serbia (SRB)					1	1	6	5			9	9	16	15
28	Argentina (ARG)					1	2	2	4		1	4	13	7	21
27	Romania (ROU)							1	1			10	15	11	16
27	United Kingdom (GBR)	1			1	2	2	2	5		1	3	10	8	19
26	China (CHN)			1	1	1	1	1	3	2	2	7	7	12	14
26	Brazil (BRA)							5	2	1	1	6	11	12	14
25	France (FRA)	1				1	3	1	1		1	9	8	12	13
25	Netherlands (NED)		1					3	3			4	14	7	18
19	Slovakia (SVK)					1		3	1		1	6	7	10	9
19	Switzerland (SUI)					1		1	3			7	7	9	10
18	Australia (AUS)						1	3	4	2	1	1	6	6	12
18	Belarus (BLR)							2	3			4	9	6	12
17	Hungary (HUN)		1			1		1	1	1		8	4	11	6
17	Croatia (CRO)		1	1		2		3	3	1		3	3	10	7
16	Spain (ESP)							1	1			7	7	8	8
16	India (IND)											5	11	5	11
15	Austria (AUT)		1					8				3	3	11	4
15	Belgium (BEL)					1	1	3	1		1	6	2	10	5
14	Israel (ISR)					1	1	1				6	5	8	6
14	South Korea (KOR)								1			4	9	4	10
13	Turkey (TUR)							1	2			5	5	6	7
13	Sweden (SWE)										2	4	7	4	9
12	Poland (POL)						2	1	5				4	1	11
12	Bulgaria (BUL)								2		1	1	8	1	11
10	Slovenia (SLO)	1	1			1		4				1	2	7	3
10	Thailand (THA)					1	3	1	4			1		3	7
9	Greece (GRE)				1							4	4	4	5
9	Chinese Taipei (TPE)								3			3	3	3	6
8	Mexico (MEX)								1		1	4	2	4	4
8	Montenegro (MNE)							2	2			1	3	3	5
8	Kyrgyzstan (KGZ)								1			3	4	3	5
7	Liechtenstein (LIE)	1					1	1	1	1		1	1	4	3
7	Paraguay (PAR)								2			4	1	4	3
7	Canada (CAN)		1				1	1	3			1		2	5
7	Latvia (LAT)							1	4			1	1	2	5
7	Uzbekistan (UZB)							1	1			1	4	2	5
7	Chile (CHI)								3			1	3	1	6
6	Estonia (EST)							1	1			2	2	3	'3
5	Indonesia (INA)											2	3	2	3
5	Venezuela (VEN)							1	3				1	1	4
5	Georgia (GEO)						2		1				2	0	5
5	Bolivia (BOL)								3				2	0	5
5	Macedonia (MKD)												5	0	5
4	Portugal (POR)											3	1	3	1
4	Kazakhstan (KAZ)								2			1	1	1	3
4	Egypt (EGY)											1	3	1	3
3	Tunisia (TUN)					2		1						3	0
3	Colombia (COL)					1		1					1	2	1
3	Bosnia and Herzegovina (BIH)				1				1				1	0	3
3	South Africa (RSA)						1						2	0	3
2	Denmark (DEN)											2		2	0
2	Finland (FIN)												2	0	2
2	Madagascar (MAD)												2	0	2
2	New Zealand (NZL)												2	0	2
2	Oman (OMA)											2		2	0
1	Algeria (ALG)											1		1	0
1	Hong Kong (HKG)											1		1	0
1	Peru (PER)											1		1	0
1	Lithuania (LTU)								1					0	1
1	Norway (NOR)								1					0	1
1	Armenia (ARM)												1	0	1
1	Dominican Republic (DOM)												1	0	1
1	Guatemala (GUA)												1	0	1
1	Philippines (PHI)												1	0	1

== Ranking distribution ==
Description	W	F	SF	QF	R16	R32	QLFR	Q3	Q2	Q1
ITF $100,000 + H(S)	150	110	80	40	20	1	6	4	1	–
ITF $100,000 + H(D)	150	110	80	40	1	–	–	–	–	–
ITF $100,000 (S)	140	100	70	36	18	1	6	4	1	–
ITF $100,000 (D)	140	100	70	36	1	–	–	–	–	–
ITF $75,000 + H(S)	130	90	58	32	16	1	6	4	1	–
ITF $75,000 + H(D)	130	90	58	32	1	–	–	–	–	–
ITF $75,000 (S)	110	78	50	30	14	1	6	4	1	–
ITF $75,000 (D)	110	78	50	30	1	–	–	–	–	–
ITF $50,000 + H(S)	90	64	40	24	12	1	6	4	1	–
ITF $50,000 + H(D)	90	64	40	24	1	–	–	–	–	–
ITF $50,000 (S)	70	50	32	18	10	1	6	4	1	–
ITF $50,000 (D)	70	50	32	18	1	–	–	–	–	–
ITF $25,000 (S)	50	34	24	14	8	1	1	–	–	–
ITF $25,000 (D)	50	34	24	14	1	–	–	–	–	–
ITF $15,000 (S)	20	15	11	8	1	–	–	–	–	–
ITF $15,000 (D)	20	15	11	1	0	–	–	–	–	–
ITF $10,000 (S)	12	8	6	4	1	–	–	–	–	–
ITF $10,000 (D)	12	8	6	1	0	–	–	–	–	–

"+H" indicates that Hospitality is provided.
