= 2010 ITF Women's Circuit (January–March) =

The 2010 ITF Women's Circuit is the 2010 edition of the second-tier tour for women's professional tennis. It is organised by the International Tennis Federation and is a tier below the WTA Tour. During the months of January 2010 and March 2010 over 50 tournaments were played with the majority being played in the month of March.

== Key ==
$100,000 tournaments
$75,000 tournaments
$50,000 tournaments
$25,000 tournaments
$10,000 tournaments

== January ==
Week of	Tournament	Winner	Runners-up	Semifinalists	Quarterfinalists
January 4	Blossom Cup; Quanzhou, China; Hard $50,000; Singles draw – Doubles draw	(Serbia) Aleksandra Krunić; 6–3, 7–5	(China) Zhou Yimiao	(Serbia) Bojana Jovanovski (Ukraine) Yuliya Beygelzimer	(Greece) Anna Gerasimou (China) Lu Jingjing (China) Xu Yifan (China) Yan Zi
January 4	Blossom Cup; Quanzhou, China; Hard $50,000; Singles draw – Doubles draw	(China) Liu Wanting (China) Zhou Yimiao; 6–1, 6–2	(Ukraine) Yuliya Beygelzimer (China) Yan Zi	(Serbia) Bojana Jovanovski (Ukraine) Yuliya Beygelzimer	(Greece) Anna Gerasimou (China) Lu Jingjing (China) Xu Yifan (China) Yan Zi
January 4	Saint-Martin; Hard $10,000; Singles draw – Doubles draw	(France) Nathalie Piquion; 7–6^{(7–4)}, 6–1	(France) Alizé Lim	(Slovakia) Martina Frantová (Austria) Christine Kandler	(France) Lou Brouleau (France) Anne-Valérie Evain (France) Laurence Combes (France) Océane Adam
January 4	Saint-Martin; Hard $10,000; Singles draw – Doubles draw	(France) Brandy Mina (France) Nathalie Piquion; 4–6, 6–1, [10–5]	(France) Anne-Valérie Evain (France) Bianca Nocella	(Slovakia) Martina Frantová (Austria) Christine Kandler	(France) Lou Brouleau (France) Anne-Valérie Evain (France) Laurence Combes (France) Océane Adam
January 11	Aegon GB Pro-Series Glasgow; Glasgow, Great Britain; Hard $10,000; Singles draw – Doubles draw	(Germany) Sarah Gronert; 2–6, 6–2, 6–1	(Germany) Julia Babilon	(United Kingdom) Anna Smith (Netherlands) Lesley Kerkhove	(Netherlands) Nicolette van Uitert (Romania) Liana Ungur (Estonia) Margit Rüütel (Germany) Nicola Geuer
January 11	Aegon GB Pro-Series Glasgow; Glasgow, Great Britain; Hard $10,000; Singles draw – Doubles draw	(France) Victoria Larrière (United Kingdom) Anna Smith; 6–4, 6–4	(Italy) Nicole Clerico (Romania) Liana Ungur	(United Kingdom) Anna Smith (Netherlands) Lesley Kerkhove	(Netherlands) Nicolette van Uitert (Romania) Liana Ungur (Estonia) Margit Rüütel (Germany) Nicola Geuer
January 11	Le Gosier, Guadeloupe; Hard $10,000; Singles draw – Doubles draw	(France) Alizé Lim; 6–1, 6–2	(France) Nathalie Piquion	(France) Anne-Valérie Evain (France) Bianca Nocella	(United States) Ivana King (United States) Kayla Rizzolo (France) Brandy Mina (France) Lou Brouleau
January 11	Le Gosier, Guadeloupe; Hard $10,000; Singles draw – Doubles draw	(Denmark) Malou Ejdesgaard (France) Alizé Lim; 6–1, 5–7, [10–3]	(United States) Kayla Rizzolo (United States) Katie Ruckert	(France) Anne-Valérie Evain (France) Bianca Nocella	(United States) Ivana King (United States) Kayla Rizzolo (France) Brandy Mina (France) Lou Brouleau
January 11	Pingguo, China; Hard $25,000; Singles draw – Doubles draw	(China) Zhou Yimiao; 6–3, 6–0	(Greece) Anna Gerasimou	(China) Ji Chunmei (Ukraine) Yuliya Beygelzimer	(Hong Kong) Zhang Ling (Japan) Chiaki Okadaue (South Korea) Ham Mi-rae (Uzbekistan) Nigina Abduraimova
January 11	Pingguo, China; Hard $25,000; Singles draw – Doubles draw	(Chinese Taipei) Chan Chin-wei (China) Xu Yifan; 6–3, 6–1	(China) Ji Chunmei (China) Liu Wanting	(China) Ji Chunmei (Ukraine) Yuliya Beygelzimer	(Hong Kong) Zhang Ling (Japan) Chiaki Okadaue (South Korea) Ham Mi-rae (Uzbekistan) Nigina Abduraimova
January 11	Plantation, United States; Clay $25,000; Singles draw – Doubles draw	(Croatia) Ajla Tomljanović; 6–3, 6–3	(Sweden) Johanna Larsson	(Estonia) Maret Ani (Colombia) Mariana Duque Mariño	(United States) Christina McHale (France) Olivia Sanchez (Poland) Karolina Kosińska (United States) Ahsha Rolle
January 11	Plantation, United States; Clay $25,000; Singles draw – Doubles draw	(France) Aurélie Védy (United States) Mashona Washington; 6–0, 6–2	(Argentina) Jorgelina Cravero (Argentina) María Irigoyen	(Estonia) Maret Ani (Colombia) Mariana Duque Mariño	(United States) Christina McHale (France) Olivia Sanchez (Poland) Karolina Kosińska (United States) Ahsha Rolle
January 18	Wrexham, Great Britain; Hard $10,000; Singles draw – Doubles draw	(Germany) Mona Barthel; 6–1, 6–1	(Luxembourg) Anne Kremer	(Germany) Julia Babilon (Estonia) Margit Rüütel	(United States) Mallory Cecil (France) Audrey Bergot (United Kingdom) Anna Smith (Netherlands) Lesley Kerkhove
January 18	Wrexham, Great Britain; Hard $10,000; Singles draw – Doubles draw	(United States) Mallory Cecil (United States) Megan Moulton-Levy; 4–6, 6–0 [11–9]	(Czech Republic) Iveta Gerlová (Czech Republic) Lucie Kriegsmannová	(Germany) Julia Babilon (Estonia) Margit Rüütel	(United States) Mallory Cecil (France) Audrey Bergot (United Kingdom) Anna Smith (Netherlands) Lesley Kerkhove
January 18	Lutz, United States; Clay $25,000; Singles draw – Doubles draw	(Luxembourg) Mandy Minella; 6–2, 4–6, 6–2	(United States) Jamie Hampton	(Colombia) Mariana Duque Mariño (Argentina) Florencia Molinero	(United States) Julia Cohen (Sweden) Johanna Larsson (United States) Christina McHale (Croatia) Ajla Tomljanović
January 18	Lutz, United States; Clay $25,000; Singles draw – Doubles draw	(France) Aurélie Védy (United States) Mashona Washington; 6–3, 6–3	(Brazil) Maria Fernanda Alves (Argentina) Florencia Molinero	(Colombia) Mariana Duque Mariño (Argentina) Florencia Molinero	(United States) Julia Cohen (Sweden) Johanna Larsson (United States) Christina McHale (Croatia) Ajla Tomljanović
January 25	Grenoble, France; Hard $10,000; Singles draw – Doubles draw	(France) Anaïs Laurendon; 6–3, 6–2	(France) Victoria Larrière	(France) Mathilde Johansson (Liechtenstein) Stephanie Vogt	(France) Karla Mraz (United States) Megan Moulton-Levy (Croatia) Ana Vrljić (Ukraine) Oksana Lyubtsova
January 25	Grenoble, France; Hard $10,000; Singles draw – Doubles draw	(France) Victoria Larrière (France) Irina Ramialison; 6–3, 6–4, [11–9]	(United States) Mallory Cecil (United States) Megan Moulton-Levy	(France) Mathilde Johansson (Liechtenstein) Stephanie Vogt	(France) Karla Mraz (United States) Megan Moulton-Levy (Croatia) Ana Vrljić (Ukraine) Oksana Lyubtsova
January 25	Kaarst, Germany; Carpet $10,000; Singles draw – Doubles draw	(Germany) Annika Beck; 6–2, 7–5	(France) Audrey Bergot	(Germany) Julia Babilon (Germany) Sarah Gronert	(Spain) Laura Pous Tió (Poland) Anna Korzeniak (Germany) Nicola Geuer (Czech Republic) Tereza Hladíková
January 25	Kaarst, Germany; Carpet $10,000; Singles draw – Doubles draw	(Germany) Nicola Geuer (Germany) Lena-Marie Hofmann; 6–4, 6–4	(Germany) Kim Grajdek (Germany) Syna Kayser	(Germany) Julia Babilon (Germany) Sarah Gronert	(Spain) Laura Pous Tió (Poland) Anna Korzeniak (Germany) Nicola Geuer (Czech Republic) Tereza Hladíková

== February ==
Week of	Tournament	Winner	Runners-up	Semifinalists	Quarterfinalists
February 1	Mallorca, Spain; Clay $10,000; Singles draw – Doubles draw	(Russia) Viktoria Kamenskaya; 7–6^{(7–4)}, 3–6, 6–2	(Spain) Garbiñe Muguruza	(Spain) Inés Ferrer Suárez (Germany) Anne Schäfer	(Bulgaria) Martina Gledacheva (Italy) Paola Cigui (Italy) Benedetta Davato (Germany) Scarlett Werner
February 1	Mallorca, Spain; Clay $10,000; Singles draw – Doubles draw	(Russia) Viktoria Kamenskaya (Russia) Daria Kuchmina; 7–5, 6–4 [10–5]	(Morocco) Fatima El Allami (Morocco) Nadia Lalami	(Spain) Inés Ferrer Suárez (Germany) Anne Schäfer	(Bulgaria) Martina Gledacheva (Italy) Paola Cigui (Italy) Benedetta Davato (Germany) Scarlett Werner
February 1	Belfort, France; Carpet $25,000; Singles draw – Doubles draw	(Russia) Elena Bovina; 7–6^{(7–3)}, 5–7, 6–4	(Italy) Romina Oprandi	(Italy) Claudia Giovine (France) Estelle Guisard	(France) Claire Feuerstein (Spain) Yera Campos Molina (Croatia) Ani Mijačika (Austria) Nikola Hofmanova
February 1	Belfort, France; Carpet $25,000; Singles draw – Doubles draw	(Russia) Elena Bovina (France) Irena Pavlovic; 6–2, 2–6, [10–6]	(Austria) Nikola Hofmanova (Russia) Karina Pimkina	(Italy) Claudia Giovine (France) Estelle Guisard	(France) Claire Feuerstein (Spain) Yera Campos Molina (Croatia) Ani Mijačika (Austria) Nikola Hofmanova
February 1	McDonald's Burnie International; Burnie, Australia; Hard $25,000; Singles draw – Doubles draw	(Russia) Arina Rodionova; 6–1, 6–0	(Australia) Jarmila Groth	(Japan) Chiaki Okadaue (Australia) Jessica Moore	(Australia) Alison Bai (Chinese Taipei) Hwang I-hsuan (Turkey) Çağla Büyükakçay (China) Yan Zi
February 1	McDonald's Burnie International; Burnie, Australia; Hard $25,000; Singles draw – Doubles draw	(Australia) Jessica Moore (Russia) Arina Rodionova; 6–2, 6–4	(Hungary) Tímea Babos (Russia) Anna Arina Marenko	(Japan) Chiaki Okadaue (Australia) Jessica Moore	(Australia) Alison Bai (Chinese Taipei) Hwang I-hsuan (Turkey) Çağla Büyükakçay (China) Yan Zi
February 1	Rancho Mirage, United States; Hard $25,000; Singles draw – Doubles draw	(France) Olivia Sanchez; 7–5, 6–0	(Slovenia) Tadeja Majerič	(United States) Lilia Osterloh (United States) Alison Riske	(United States) Kimberly Couts (United States) Madison Brengle (South Korea) Lee Ye-ra (United States) Angela Haynes
February 1	Rancho Mirage, United States; Hard $25,000; Singles draw – Doubles draw	(Australia) Monique Adamczak (United States) Abigail Spears; 6–3, 6–4	(Ukraine) Lyudmyla Kichenok (Ukraine) Nadiia Kichenok	(United States) Lilia Osterloh (United States) Alison Riske	(United States) Kimberly Couts (United States) Madison Brengle (South Korea) Lee Ye-ra (United States) Angela Haynes
February 1	Sutton, Great Britain; Hard $25,000; Singles draw – Doubles draw	(Czech Republic) Andrea Hlaváčková; 6–1, 4–6, 6–4	(United States) Mallory Cecil	(Lithuania) Lina Stančiūtė (United Kingdom) Anna Smith	(Luxembourg) Anne Kremer (United Kingdom) Naomi Cavaday (United Kingdom) Heather Watson (Germany) Mona Barthel
February 1	Sutton, Great Britain; Hard $25,000; Singles draw – Doubles draw	(Greece) Irini Georgatou (Russia) Valeria Savinykh; 7–5, 2–6, [10–8]	(United Kingdom) Naomi Cavaday (United Kingdom) Heather Watson	(Lithuania) Lina Stančiūtė (United Kingdom) Anna Smith	(Luxembourg) Anne Kremer (United Kingdom) Naomi Cavaday (United Kingdom) Heather Watson (Germany) Mona Barthel
February 8	Eilat, Israel; Hard $10,000; Singles draw – Doubles draw	(Austria) Janina Toljan; 6–1, 6–2	(Slovakia) Jana Čepelová	(France) Elixane Lechemia (Russia) Yanina Darishina	(Israel) Keren Shlomo (Germany) Anna Zaja (Slovakia) Zuzana Luknárová (Italy) Nicole Clerico
February 8	Eilat, Israel; Hard $10,000; Singles draw – Doubles draw	(Italy) Martina Caciotti (Italy) Nicole Clerico; 6–1, 6–3	(Russia) Renata Bakieva (Russia) Yanina Darishina	(France) Elixane Lechemia (Russia) Yanina Darishina	(Israel) Keren Shlomo (Germany) Anna Zaja (Slovakia) Zuzana Luknárová (Italy) Nicole Clerico
February 8	Mallorca, Spain; Clay $10,000; Singles draw – Doubles draw	(Spain) Garbiñe Muguruza; 3–6, 6–2, 6–0	(Poland) Katarzyna Kawa	(Spain) Eloisa Compostizo de Andrés (Spain) Inés Ferrer Suárez	(France) Cindy Chala (Russia) Avgusta Tsybysheva (Georgia (country)) Ekaterine Gorgodze (Germany) Lena-Marie Hofmann
February 8	Mallorca, Spain; Clay $10,000; Singles draw – Doubles draw	(Georgia (country)) Sofia Kvatsabaia (Russia) Avgusta Tsybysheva; 7–6^{(8–6)} 6–4	(Italy) Benedetta Davato (Spain) Inés Ferrer Suárez	(Spain) Eloisa Compostizo de Andrés (Spain) Inés Ferrer Suárez	(France) Cindy Chala (Russia) Avgusta Tsybysheva (Georgia (country)) Ekaterine Gorgodze (Germany) Lena-Marie Hofmann
February 8	Vale do Lobo, Portugal; Hard $10,000; Singles draw – Doubles draw	(Italy) Julia Mayr; 6–1, 6–1	(Portugal) Maria João Koehler	(Netherlands) Nicolette van Uitert (Italy) Martina Di Giuseppe	(Netherlands) Lesley Kerkhove (Turkey) Pemra Özgen (Bulgaria) Elitsa Kostova (Italy) Evelyn Mayr
February 8	Vale do Lobo, Portugal; Hard $10,000; Singles draw – Doubles draw	(Italy) Evelyn Mayr (Italy) Julia Mayr; 6–2, 6–1	(Bosnia and Herzegovina) Sandra Martinović (Italy) Lisa Sabino	(Netherlands) Nicolette van Uitert (Italy) Martina Di Giuseppe	(Netherlands) Lesley Kerkhove (Turkey) Pemra Özgen (Bulgaria) Elitsa Kostova (Italy) Evelyn Mayr
February 8	Dow Corning Tennis Classic; Midland, United States; Hard $100,000; Singles draw – Doubles draw	(United Kingdom) Elena Baltacha; 5–7, 6–2, 6–3	(Czech Republic) Lucie Hradecká	(United States) Laura Granville (Poland) Marta Domachowska	(Sweden) Sofia Arvidsson (Netherlands) Arantxa Rus (Canada) Rebecca Marino (United Kingdom) Anne Keothavong
February 8	Dow Corning Tennis Classic; Midland, United States; Hard $100,000; Singles draw – Doubles draw	(United States) Laura Granville (Czech Republic) Lucie Hradecká; 7–6^{(7–2)}, 3–6, [12–10]	(United States) Lilia Osterloh (Georgia (country)) Anna Tatishvili	(United States) Laura Granville (Poland) Marta Domachowska	(Sweden) Sofia Arvidsson (Netherlands) Arantxa Rus (Canada) Rebecca Marino (United Kingdom) Anne Keothavong
February 8	Laguna Niguel, United States; Hard $25,000; Singles draw – Doubles draw	(France) Olivia Sanchez; 6–3, 6–4	(Luxembourg) Mandy Minella	(Japan) Rika Fujiwara (United Kingdom) Georgie Stoop	(United States) Abigail Spears (Australia) Johanna Konta (Russia) Elena Kulikova (Argentina) Florencia Molinero
February 8	Laguna Niguel, United States; Hard $25,000; Singles draw – Doubles draw	(Russia) Anastasia Pivovarova (Germany) Laura Siegemund; 6–2, 6–3	(United States) Amanda Fink (United States) Elizabeth Lumpkin	(Japan) Rika Fujiwara (United Kingdom) Georgie Stoop	(United States) Abigail Spears (Australia) Johanna Konta (Russia) Elena Kulikova (Argentina) Florencia Molinero
February 8	Stockholm, Sweden; Hard $25,000 Singles draw – Doubles draw	(Ukraine) Oksana Lyubtsova; 6–4, 7–5	(Ukraine) Lesia Tsurenko	(Germany) Carmen Klaschka (Germany) Sarah Gronert	(France) Stéphanie Vongsouthi (Estonia) Maret Ani (Ukraine) Irina Buryachok (Hungary) Anikó Kapros
February 8	Stockholm, Sweden; Hard $25,000 Singles draw – Doubles draw	(Belarus) Ksenia Milevskaya (Ukraine) Lesia Tsurenko; 6–4, 7–5	(Austria) Nikola Hofmanova (Austria) Yvonne Meusburger	(Germany) Carmen Klaschka (Germany) Sarah Gronert	(France) Stéphanie Vongsouthi (Estonia) Maret Ani (Ukraine) Irina Buryachok (Hungary) Anikó Kapros
February 8	Copa Bionaire; Cali, Colombia; Clay $75,000; Singles draw – Doubles draw	(Slovenia) Polona Hercog; 6–4, 5–7, 6–2	(Colombia) Mariana Duque Mariño	(Czech Republic) Klára Zakopalová (Paraguay) Rossana de los Ríos	(Colombia) Catalina Castaño (Austria) Patricia Mayr (Spain) Arantxa Parra Santonja (Slovenia) Maša Zec Peškirič
February 8	Copa Bionaire; Cali, Colombia; Clay $75,000; Singles draw – Doubles draw	(Romania) Edina Gallovits (Slovenia) Polona Hercog; 3–6, 6–3, [10–8]	(Spain) Estrella Cabeza Candela (Spain) Laura Pous Tió	(Czech Republic) Klára Zakopalová (Paraguay) Rossana de los Ríos	(Colombia) Catalina Castaño (Austria) Patricia Mayr (Spain) Arantxa Parra Santonja (Slovenia) Maša Zec Peškirič
February 15	Albufeira, Portugal; Hard $10,000; Singles draw – Doubles draw	(Italy) Evelyn Mayr; 6–4, 6–4	(Bulgaria) Elitsa Kostova	(Italy) Claudia Giovine (Turkey) Pemra Özgen	(Ukraine) Maryna Zanevska (France) Constance Sibille (Hungary) Zsófia Susányi (Italy) Julia Mayr
February 15	Mildura, Australia; Grass $25,000; Singles draw – Doubles draw	(Australia) Casey Dellacqua; 7–5, 6–0	(Australia) Sally Peers	(Czech Republic) Kristýna Plíšková (Australia) Tiffany Welford	(Australia) Jarmila Groth (Australia) Alison Bai (Japan) Akiko Yonemura (Japan) Sakiko Shimizu
February 15	Mildura, Australia; Grass $25,000; Singles draw – Doubles draw	(Australia) Casey Dellacqua (Australia) Jessica Moore; 6–2, 7–6^{(7–3)}	(Australia) Jarmila Groth (Australia) Jade Hopper	(Czech Republic) Kristýna Plíšková (Australia) Tiffany Welford	(Australia) Jarmila Groth (Australia) Alison Bai (Japan) Akiko Yonemura (Japan) Sakiko Shimizu
February 15	Surprise, United States; Hard $25,000; Singles draw – Doubles draw	(United States) Abigail Spears; 6–1, 6–2	(Japan) Kurumi Nara	(United States) Varvara Lepchenko (United States) Christina McHale	(Russia) Olga Puchkova (United States) Julia Boserup (Russia) Anastasia Pivovarova (Australia) Monique Adamczak
February 15	Surprise, United States; Hard $25,000; Singles draw – Doubles draw	(China) Ji Chunmei (China) Xu Yifan; 5–7, 6–2, [10–5]	(United States) Christina Fusano (United States) Courtney Nagle	(United States) Varvara Lepchenko (United States) Christina McHale	(Russia) Olga Puchkova (United States) Julia Boserup (Russia) Anastasia Pivovarova (Australia) Monique Adamczak
February 22	Madrid, Spain; Clay $10,000; Singles draw – Doubles draw	(Spain) María Teresa Torró Flor; 7–5, 3–6, 6–4	(Italy) Giulia Gatto-Monticone	(Russia) Nanuli Pipiya (Italy) Gioia Barbieri	(Austria) Tina Schiechtl (Morocco) Nadia Lalami (Russia) Avgusta Tsybysheva (Spain) Lara Arruabarrena-Vecino
February 22	Madrid, Spain; Clay $10,000; Singles draw – Doubles draw	(Italy) Giulia Gatto-Monticone (Italy) Federica Quercia; 5–7, 6–4, [10–6]	(Italy) Benedetta Davato (Spain) Inés Ferrer Suárez	(Russia) Nanuli Pipiya (Italy) Gioia Barbieri	(Austria) Tina Schiechtl (Morocco) Nadia Lalami (Russia) Avgusta Tsybysheva (Spain) Lara Arruabarrena-Vecino
February 22	Portimão, Portugal; Hard $10,000; Singles draw – Doubles draw	(Italy) Claudia Giovine; 3–6, 6–2, 7–6^{(7–1)},	(Netherlands) Kiki Bertens	(France) Constance Sibille (Spain) Lucía Cerverá Vásquez	(South Africa) Chanel Simmonds (France) Elixane Lechemia (Spain) Sandra Soler-Sola (France) Irina Ramialison
February 22	Portimão, Portugal; Hard $10,000; Singles draw – Doubles draw	(Poland) Justyna Jegiołka (Poland) Barbara Sobaszkiewicz; 3–6, 7–6(8–6) [10–5]	(Belgium) Gally De Wael (Estonia) Anett Schutting	(France) Constance Sibille (Spain) Lucía Cerverá Vásquez	(South Africa) Chanel Simmonds (France) Elixane Lechemia (Spain) Sandra Soler-Sola (France) Irina Ramialison
February 22	Biberach Open; Biberach, Germany; Hard $50,000+H; Singles draw – Doubles draw	(Sweden) Johanna Larsson; 4–6, 6–2, 6–2	(Italy) Romina Oprandi	(Ukraine) Viktoriya Kutuzova (Romania) Simona Halep	(Germany) Kristina Barrois (Russia) Vesna Manasieva (Germany) Carmen Klaschka (Austria) Yvonne Meusburger
February 22	Biberach Open; Biberach, Germany; Hard $50,000+H; Singles draw – Doubles draw	(France) Stéphanie Cohen-Aloro (Tunisia) Selima Sfar; 5–7, 6–1, [10–5]	(Germany) Mona Barthel (Germany) Carmen Klaschka	(Ukraine) Viktoriya Kutuzova (Romania) Simona Halep	(Germany) Kristina Barrois (Russia) Vesna Manasieva (Germany) Carmen Klaschka (Austria) Yvonne Meusburger

== March ==
Week of	Tournament	Winner	Runners-up	Semifinalists	Quarterfinalists
March 1	Sydney, Australia; Hard $25,000; Singles draw – Doubles draw	(Australia) Jarmila Groth; 6–3, 6–3	(Japan) Yurika Sema	(Japan) Ryōko Fuda (Australia) Shannon Golds	(Japan) Erika Sema (Australia) Viktorija Rajicic (Australia) Marija Mirkovic (Australia) Sophie Ferguson
March 1	Sydney, Australia; Hard $25,000; Singles draw – Doubles draw	(Australia) Casey Dellacqua (Australia) Jessica Moore; Walkover	(Australia) Sophie Ferguson (Australia) Trudi Musgrave	(Japan) Ryōko Fuda (Australia) Shannon Golds	(Japan) Erika Sema (Australia) Viktorija Rajicic (Australia) Marija Mirkovic (Australia) Sophie Ferguson
March 1	Lyon, France; Hard $10,000; Singles draw – Doubles draw	(Italy) Anna-Giulia Remondina; 6–1, 7–6^{(7–0)}	(Poland) Anna Korzeniak	(France) Stéphanie Vongsouthi (Ukraine) Ganna Piven	(Liechtenstein) Stephanie Vogt (China) Liu Shaozhuo (France) Morgane Pons (New Zealand) Ellen Barry
March 1	Lyon, France; Hard $10,000; Singles draw – Doubles draw	(Poland) Olga Brózda (Poland) Magdalena Kiszczyńska; 5–7, 6–4, [10–6]	(Romania) Elena Bogdan (France) Stéphanie Vongsouthi	(France) Stéphanie Vongsouthi (Ukraine) Ganna Piven	(Liechtenstein) Stephanie Vogt (China) Liu Shaozhuo (France) Morgane Pons (New Zealand) Ellen Barry
March 1	Minsk, Belarus; Hard $25,000; Singles draw – Doubles draw	(Russia) Anna Lapushchenkova; 6–1, 3–6, 7–6^{(7–2)}	(Ukraine) Lesia Tsurenko	(Russia) Elena Bovina (France) Irena Pavlovic	(France) Estelle Guisard (France) Anaïs Laurendon (Georgia (country)) Oksana Kalashnikova (Italy) Romina Oprandi
March 1	Minsk, Belarus; Hard $25,000; Singles draw – Doubles draw	(Russia) Elena Bovina (France) Irena Pavlovic; 6–0, 6–1	(Estonia) Maret Ani (Russia) Vitalia Diatchenko	(Russia) Elena Bovina (France) Irena Pavlovic	(France) Estelle Guisard (France) Anaïs Laurendon (Georgia (country)) Oksana Kalashnikova (Italy) Romina Oprandi
March 1	Madrid, Spain; Clay $10,000; Singles draw – Doubles draw	(Italy) Elisa Balsamo; 6–1, 6–4	(Romania) Alexandra Cadanțu	(Austria) Tina Schiechtl (Spain) Leticia Costas Moreira	(United Kingdom) Amanda Carreras (Italy) Valentina Sulpizio (Italy) Anastasia Grymalska (Italy) Giulia Gatto-Monticone
March 1	Madrid, Spain; Clay $10,000; Singles draw – Doubles draw	(Italy) Elisa Balsamo (Italy) Valentina Sulpizio; 6–3, 7–6^{(7–3)}	(Serbia) Neda Kozić (Russia) Marina Shamayko	(Austria) Tina Schiechtl (Spain) Leticia Costas Moreira	(United Kingdom) Amanda Carreras (Italy) Valentina Sulpizio (Italy) Anastasia Grymalska (Italy) Giulia Gatto-Monticone
March 1	Antalya, Turkey; Clay $10,000; Singles draw – Doubles draw	(Italy) Evelyn Mayr; 6–4, 6–2	(Italy) Julia Mayr	(Romania) Liana Ungur (Slovakia) Katarína Kachlíková	(Poland) Sandra Zaniewska (Romania) Bianca Hîncu (Romania) Simona Matei (Bulgaria) Dia Evtimova
March 1	Antalya, Turkey; Clay $10,000; Singles draw – Doubles draw	(Slovakia) Michaela Pochabová (Slovakia) Romana Tabaková; 6–1, 6–1	(Romania) Diana Marcu (Romania) Simona Matei	(Romania) Liana Ungur (Slovakia) Katarína Kachlíková	(Poland) Sandra Zaniewska (Romania) Bianca Hîncu (Romania) Simona Matei (Bulgaria) Dia Evtimova
March 1	Hammond, United States; Hard $25,000; Singles draw – Doubles draw	(China) Zhang Shuai; 6–2, 6–1	(United States) Jamie Hampton	(China) Xu Yifan (Japan) Kurumi Nara	(France) Stéphanie Foretz (United Kingdom) Heather Watson (United Kingdom) Naomi Broady (China) Zhou Yimiao
March 1	Hammond, United States; Hard $25,000; Singles draw – Doubles draw	(China) Xu Yifan (China) Zhou Yimiao; 6–2, 6–2	(United States) Christina Fusano (United States) Courtney Nagle	(China) Xu Yifan (Japan) Kurumi Nara	(France) Stéphanie Foretz (United Kingdom) Heather Watson (United Kingdom) Naomi Broady (China) Zhou Yimiao
March 8	Clearwater, United States; Hard $25,000; Singles draw – Doubles draw	(Sweden) Johanna Larsson; 7–6^{(7–4)}, 6–0	(China) Shuai Zhang	(China) Lu Jingjing (United Kingdom) Georgie Stoop	(China) Zhou Yimiao (Spain) Estrella Cabeza Candela (China) Han Xinyun (Australia) Sophie Ferguson
March 8	Clearwater, United States; Hard $25,000; Singles draw – Doubles draw	(China) Xu Yifan (China) Zhou Yimiao; 6–4, 6–4	(Russia) Alina Jidkova (Germany) Laura Siegemund	(China) Lu Jingjing (United Kingdom) Georgie Stoop	(China) Zhou Yimiao (Spain) Estrella Cabeza Candela (China) Han Xinyun (Australia) Sophie Ferguson
March 8	Buchen, Germany; Carpet $10,000; Singles draw – Doubles draw	(Italy) Romina Oprandi; 6–1, 6–3	(Ukraine) Irina Buryachok	(Czech Republic) Eva Birnerová (Switzerland) Xenia Knoll	(Poland) Katarzyna Piter (Germany) Annika Beck (Spain) Yera Campos Molina (Germany) Stephanie Wagner
March 8	Buchen, Germany; Carpet $10,000; Singles draw – Doubles draw	(Ukraine) Irina Buryachok (Switzerland) Amra Sadiković; 7–5, 6–3	(Czech Republic) Simona Dobrá (Czech Republic) Tereza Hladíková	(Czech Republic) Eva Birnerová (Switzerland) Xenia Knoll	(Poland) Katarzyna Piter (Germany) Annika Beck (Spain) Yera Campos Molina (Germany) Stephanie Wagner
March 8	Dijon, France; Hard $10,000; Singles draw – Doubles draw	(Ukraine) Ganna Piven; 6–4, 7–5	(France) Anais Laurendon	(United Kingdom) Anna Smith (France) Stéphanie Vongsouthi	(Belarus) Iryna Kuryanovich (Switzerland) Nicole Riner (Luxembourg) Claudine Schaul (Russia) Ksenia Kirillova
March 8	Dijon, France; Hard $10,000; Singles draw – Doubles draw	(France) Estelle Guisard (France) Anais Laurendon; 7–5, 7–5	(Poland) Olga Brózda (Poland) Magdalena Kiszczyńska	(United Kingdom) Anna Smith (France) Stéphanie Vongsouthi	(Belarus) Iryna Kuryanovich (Switzerland) Nicole Riner (Luxembourg) Claudine Schaul (Russia) Ksenia Kirillova
March 8	Metepec, Mexico; Hard $10,000; Singles draw – Doubles draw	(United States) Macall Harkins; 6–1, 6–3	(Brazil) Maria Fernanda Alves	(Argentina) Aranza Salut (France) Laura Thorpe	(Bolivia) María Fernanda Álvarez (Brazil) Ana Clara Duarte (Brazil) Vivian Segnini (United States) Katie Ruckert
March 8	Metepec, Mexico; Hard $10,000; Singles draw – Doubles draw	(United States) Amanda Fink (United States) Elizabeth Lumpkin; 6–3, 5–7, [10–8]	(Brazil) Maria Fernanda Alves (Mexico) Daniela Múñoz Gallegos	(Argentina) Aranza Salut (France) Laura Thorpe	(Bolivia) María Fernanda Álvarez (Brazil) Ana Clara Duarte (Brazil) Vivian Segnini (United States) Katie Ruckert
March 8	Antalya, Turkey; Clay $10,000; Singles draw – Doubles draw	(Slovakia) Michaela Pochabová; 6–1, 7–5	(Italy) Evelyn Mayr	(Kyrgyzstan) Ksenia Palkina (Russia) Nanuli Pipiya	(Turkey) Pemra Özgen (Italy) Julia Mayr (Argentina) Vanesa Furlanetto (Bulgaria) Dia Evtimova
March 8	Antalya, Turkey; Clay $10,000; Singles draw – Doubles draw	(Romania) Diana Enache (Romania) Cristina Mitu; 6–7^{(3–7)}, 6–1, [11–9]	(Italy) Evelyn Mayr (Italy) Julia Mayr	(Kyrgyzstan) Ksenia Palkina (Russia) Nanuli Pipiya	(Turkey) Pemra Özgen (Italy) Julia Mayr (Argentina) Vanesa Furlanetto (Bulgaria) Dia Evtimova
March 15	Fort Walton Beach, United States; Hard $25,000; Singles draw – Doubles draw	(South Africa) Chanelle Scheepers; 7–5, 7–5	(Australia) Sophie Ferguson	(Bulgaria) Tsvetana Pironkova (Sweden) Johanna Larsson	(Belarus) Anastasiya Yakimova (Canada) Stéphanie Dubois (Netherlands) Arantxa Rus (China) Han Xinyun
March 15	Fort Walton Beach, United States; Hard $25,000; Singles draw – Doubles draw	(Sweden) Johanna Larsson (South Africa) Chanelle Scheepers; 2–6, 7–5^{(7–4)}, [10–7]	(United States) Christina Fusano (United States) Courtney Nagle	(Bulgaria) Tsvetana Pironkova (Sweden) Johanna Larsson	(Belarus) Anastasiya Yakimova (Canada) Stéphanie Dubois (Netherlands) Arantxa Rus (China) Han Xinyun
March 15	Wetzikon, Switzerland; Carpet $10,000; Singles draw – Doubles draw	(Switzerland) Amra Sadiković; 7–5, 7–5	(Germany) Nina Zander	(Ukraine) Irina Buryachok (Czech Republic) Tereza Hladíková	(Italy) Martina Di Giuseppe (Switzerland) Nicole Riner (Switzerland) Xenia Knoll (Germany) Anna Zaja
March 15	Wetzikon, Switzerland; Carpet $10,000; Singles draw – Doubles draw	(Switzerland) Xenia Knoll (Switzerland) Amra Sadiković; 6–4, 7–6^{(7–5)}	(Czech Republic) Simona Dobrá (Czech Republic) Tereza Hladíková	(Ukraine) Irina Buryachok (Czech Republic) Tereza Hladíková	(Italy) Martina Di Giuseppe (Switzerland) Nicole Riner (Switzerland) Xenia Knoll (Germany) Anna Zaja
March 15	Amiens, France; Clay $10,000; Singles draw – Doubles draw	(France) Claire de Gubernatis; 6–3, 6–3	(Italy) Giulia Gatto-Monticone	(Spain) Leticia Costas Moreira (Russia) Yulia Putintseva	(Netherlands) Bibiane Schoofs (France) Audrey Bergot (France) Karla Mraz (France) Cindy Chala
March 15	Amiens, France; Clay $10,000; Singles draw – Doubles draw	(Israel) Efrat Mishor (Croatia) Jasmina Tinjić; 7–6^{(7–5)}, 5–7 [10–5]	(France) Sherazad Benamar (France) Alizé Lim	(Spain) Leticia Costas Moreira (Russia) Yulia Putintseva	(Netherlands) Bibiane Schoofs (France) Audrey Bergot (France) Karla Mraz (France) Cindy Chala
March 15	St.Petersburg, Russia; Hard $10,000; Singles draw – Doubles draw	(Russia) Alexandra Panova; 6–1, 7–5	(Portugal) Neuza Silva	(Ukraine) Maryna Zanevska (Russia) Karina Pimkina	(Russia) Eugeniya Pashkova (Russia) Yuliya Kalabina (Russia) Marta Sirotkina (Ukraine) Alyona Sotnikova
March 15	St.Petersburg, Russia; Hard $10,000; Singles draw – Doubles draw	(Ukraine) Alyona Sotnikova (Ukraine) Maryna Zanevska; 7–5, 6–3	(Russia) Alexandra Panova (Russia) Eugeniya Pashkova	(Ukraine) Maryna Zanevska (Russia) Karina Pimkina	(Russia) Eugeniya Pashkova (Russia) Yuliya Kalabina (Russia) Marta Sirotkina (Ukraine) Alyona Sotnikova
March 15	Aegon GB Pro-Series Bath; Bath, Great Britain; Hard $10,000; Singles draw – Doubles draw	(Poland) Katarzyna Piter; 6–2, 7–6^{(8–6)}	(Slovakia) Lenka Juríková	(New Zealand) Ellen Barry (United Kingdom) Anna Smith	(Germany) Mara Nowak (Netherlands) Lesley Kerkhove (Estonia) Margit Rüütel (Croatia) Matea Mezak
March 15	Aegon GB Pro-Series Bath; Bath, Great Britain; Hard $10,000; Singles draw – Doubles draw	(Denmark) Malou Ejdesgaard (Poland) Katarzyna Piter; 6–3, 6–2	(United Kingdom) Jade Curtis (United Kingdom) Anna Fitzpatrick	(New Zealand) Ellen Barry (United Kingdom) Anna Smith	(Germany) Mara Nowak (Netherlands) Lesley Kerkhove (Estonia) Margit Rüütel (Croatia) Matea Mezak
March 15	Irapuato, Mexico; Hard $25,000; Singles draw – Doubles draw	(Australia) Monique Adamczak; 7–6^{(7–5)}, 2–6, 6–2	(Japan) Misaki Doi	(Spain) Laura Pous Tió (Argentina) Aranza Salut	(Slovakia) Kristína Kučová (Italy) Anna Floris (Peru) Bianca Botto (United States) Alison Riske
March 15	Irapuato, Mexico; Hard $25,000; Singles draw – Doubles draw	(Argentina) María Irigoyen (Argentina) Florencia Molinero; 6–7^{(3–7)}, 6–2, [10–7]	(United States) Lena Litvak (Russia) Natalia Ryzhonkova	(Spain) Laura Pous Tió (Argentina) Aranza Salut	(Slovakia) Kristína Kučová (Italy) Anna Floris (Peru) Bianca Botto (United States) Alison Riske
March 15	Antalya, Turkey; Clay $10,000; Singles draw – Doubles draw	(Italy) Julia Mayr; 6–2, 6–1	(Spain) María Teresa Torró Flor	(Netherlands) Kiki Bertens (Chile) Andrea Koch Benvenuto	(Poland) Magda Linette (Ukraine) Valentyna Ivakhnenko (United Kingdom) Amanda Carreras (Bulgaria) Dia Evtimova
March 15	Antalya, Turkey; Clay $10,000; Singles draw – Doubles draw	(Netherlands) Kiki Bertens (Netherlands) Daniëlle Harmsen; 6–2, 6–4	(Oman) Fatma Al-Nabhani (Chile) Andrea Koch Benvenuto	(Netherlands) Kiki Bertens (Chile) Andrea Koch Benvenuto	(Poland) Magda Linette (Ukraine) Valentyna Ivakhnenko (United Kingdom) Amanda Carreras (Bulgaria) Dia Evtimova
March 22	Namangan, Uzbekistan; Hard $25,000; Singles draw – Doubles draw	(Kyrgyzstan) Ksenia Palkina; 3–6, 6–4, 6–4	(Ukraine) Ganna Piven	(Romania) Elena Bogdan (Greece) Irini Georgatou	(Ukraine) Kristina Antoniychuk (Slovakia) Lenka Wienerová (Belarus) Viktoria Yemialyanava (Russia) Ksenia Lykina
March 22	Namangan, Uzbekistan; Hard $25,000; Singles draw – Doubles draw	(Ukraine) Kristina Antoniychuk (Russia) Ksenia Lykina; 6–3, 5–7, [10–8]	(Poland) Karolina Kosińska (Slovakia) Lenka Wienerová	(Romania) Elena Bogdan (Greece) Irini Georgatou	(Ukraine) Kristina Antoniychuk (Slovakia) Lenka Wienerová (Belarus) Viktoria Yemialyanava (Russia) Ksenia Lykina
March 22	Gonesse, France; Clay $10,000; Singles draw – Doubles draw	(Belarus) Iryna Kuryanovich; 6–0, 6–3	(Italy) Giulia Gatto-Monticone	(France) Claire de Gubernatis (Bulgaria) Elitsa Kostova	(Czech Republic) Petra Cetkovská (France) Aurélie Védy (France) Violette Huck (Spain) Georgina García López
March 22	Gonesse, France; Clay $10,000; Singles draw – Doubles draw	(France) Audrey Bergot (Belarus) Iryna Kuryanovich; 6–3, 6–3	(Brazil) Fernanda Fabia (Brazil) Paula Cristina Gonçalves	(France) Claire de Gubernatis (Bulgaria) Elitsa Kostova	(Czech Republic) Petra Cetkovská (France) Aurélie Védy (France) Violette Huck (Spain) Georgina García López
March 22	Kofu, Japan; Hard $10,000; Singles draw – Doubles draw	(Japan) Sachie Ishizu; 1–6, 6–1, 6–0	(Japan) Akiko Yonemura	(Japan) Ayumi Oka (Japan) Mari Tanaka	(South Korea) Kim Ji-young (China) Lu Jiajing (South Korea) Lee Ye-ra (South Korea) Yoo Mi
March 22	Kofu, Japan; Hard $10,000; Singles draw – Doubles draw	(Japan) Seiko Okamoto (Japan) Maki Arai; 6–4, 6–4	(Japan) Shiho Hisamatsu (Japan) Maiko Inoue	(Japan) Ayumi Oka (Japan) Mari Tanaka	(South Korea) Kim Ji-young (China) Lu Jiajing (South Korea) Lee Ye-ra (South Korea) Yoo Mi
March 22	The Jersey International; Jersey, Great Britain; Hard $25,000; Singles draw – Doubles draw	(Sweden) Johanna Larsson; 6–2, 6–3	(United Kingdom) Anna Smith	(France) Séverine Beltrame (Italy) Romina Oprandi	(Netherlands) Richèl Hogenkamp (Czech Republic) Eva Hrdinová (Luxembourg) Anne Kremer (Croatia) Ana Vrljić
March 22	The Jersey International; Jersey, Great Britain; Hard $25,000; Singles draw – Doubles draw	(Estonia) Maret Ani (United Kingdom) Anna Smith; 7–5, 6–4	(Australia) Jarmila Groth (United Kingdom) Melanie South	(France) Séverine Beltrame (Italy) Romina Oprandi	(Netherlands) Richèl Hogenkamp (Czech Republic) Eva Hrdinová (Luxembourg) Anne Kremer (Croatia) Ana Vrljić
March 22	Moscow, Russia; Hard $25,000; Singles draw – Doubles draw	(Russia) Anna Lapushchenkova; 6–4, 6–2	(Russia) Elena Kulikova	(Russia) Nadejda Guskova (Russia) Alexandra Panova	(Russia) Ksenia Pervak (France) Estelle Guisard (Ukraine) Lesia Tsurenko (Ukraine) Veronika Kapshay
March 22	Moscow, Russia; Hard $25,000; Singles draw – Doubles draw	(Russia) Nina Bratchikova (France) Irena Pavlovic; 6–7^{(4–7)}, 6–2, [10–3]	(Ukraine) Lyudmyla Kichenok (Ukraine) Nadiia Kichenok	(Russia) Nadejda Guskova (Russia) Alexandra Panova	(Russia) Ksenia Pervak (France) Estelle Guisard (Ukraine) Lesia Tsurenko (Ukraine) Veronika Kapshay
March 22	Antalya, Turkey; Clay $10,000; Singles draw – Doubles draw	(Ukraine) Valentyna Ivakhnenko; 6–3, 6–0	(Romania) Mihaela Buzărnescu	(Morocco) Nadia Lalami (Poland) Magda Linette	(Czech Republic) Martina Kubičíkova (Bulgaria) Dia Evtimova (Australia) Alenka Hubacek (Belgium) Sofie Oyen
March 22	Antalya, Turkey; Clay $10,000; Singles draw – Doubles draw	(Ukraine) Yuliya Beygelzimer (Greece) Anna Gerasimou; Walkover	(Romania) Mihaela Buzărnescu (Australia) Alenka Hubacek	(Morocco) Nadia Lalami (Poland) Magda Linette	(Czech Republic) Martina Kubičíkova (Bulgaria) Dia Evtimova (Australia) Alenka Hubacek (Belgium) Sofie Oyen
March 22	Pomezia, Italy; Clay $10,000; Singles draw – Doubles draw	(Italy) Martina Caregaro; 6–1, 6–1	(Spain) Eloisa Compostizo de Andrés	(Russia) Marina Shamayko (Italy) Erika Zanchetta	(Italy) Martina Di Giuseppe (Italy) Anastasia Grymalska (Slovenia) Dalila Jakupovič (Slovakia) Nikola Vajdová
March 22	Pomezia, Italy; Clay $10,000; Singles draw – Doubles draw	(Italy) Stefania Chieppa (Romania) Liana Ungur; 7–6^{(7–3)}, 4–6, [10–7]	(Italy) Andreea-Roxana Văideanu (Italy) Erika Zanchetta	(Russia) Marina Shamayko (Italy) Erika Zanchetta	(Italy) Martina Di Giuseppe (Italy) Anastasia Grymalska (Slovenia) Dalila Jakupovič (Slovakia) Nikola Vajdová
March 22	Fujairah, United Arab Emirates; Hard $10,000; Singles draw – Doubles draw	(Oman) Fatma Al-Nabhani; 7–6^{(7–1)} 6–1	(Ukraine) Katerina Avdiyenko	(Australia) Tammi Patterson (Portugal) Magali de Lattre	(Italy) Nicole Clerico (Ukraine) Sophia Kovalets (Finland) Piia Suomalainen (Georgia (country)) Manana Shapakidze
March 22	Fujairah, United Arab Emirates; Hard $10,000; Singles draw – Doubles draw	(Oman) Fatma Al-Nabhani (Portugal) Magali de Lattre; 2–6, 7–6^{(7–5)}, [10–8]	(Italy) Martina Caciotte (Italy) Nicole Clerico	(Australia) Tammi Patterson (Portugal) Magali de Lattre	(Italy) Nicole Clerico (Ukraine) Sophia Kovalets (Finland) Piia Suomalainen (Georgia (country)) Manana Shapakidze
March 22	Cairo, Egypt; Clay $10,000; Singles draw – Doubles draw	(Austria) Tina Schiechtl; 7–5, 7–5	(Spain) Lucía Cerverá-Vázquez	(Spain) Pilar Domínguez-López (Slovakia) Zuzana Zlochová	(United States) Giro Schofield (Belgium) Valerie Verhamme (Portugal) Rita Esteves De Freitas (Egypt) Ola Abou Zekry
March 22	Cairo, Egypt; Clay $10,000; Singles draw – Doubles draw	(Czech Republic) Jana Jandová (Czech Republic) Dominika Kanaková; 6–2, 6–2	(United States) Ivana King (France) Alizé Lim	(Spain) Pilar Domínguez-López (Slovakia) Zuzana Zlochová	(United States) Giro Schofield (Belgium) Valerie Verhamme (Portugal) Rita Esteves De Freitas (Egypt) Ola Abou Zekry
March 29	Pelham, United States; Clay $25,000; Singles draw – Doubles draw	(Romania) Edina Gallovits; 6–2, 6–0	(Croatia) Ajla Tomljanović	(South Africa) Chanelle Scheepers (Argentina) María Irigoyen	(United States) Kimberly Couts (Australia) Sophie Ferguson (Austria) Melanie Klaffner (United States) Julia Cohen
March 29	Pelham, United States; Clay $25,000; Singles draw – Doubles draw	(United States) Mallory Cecil (United States) Jamie Hampton; 6–4, 6–3	(Chinese Taipei) Chan Chin-wei (Australia) Nicole Kriz	(South Africa) Chanelle Scheepers (Argentina) María Irigoyen	(United States) Kimberly Couts (Australia) Sophie Ferguson (Austria) Melanie Klaffner (United States) Julia Cohen
March 29	Yugra Cup; Khanty-Mansiysk, Russia; Carpet $50,000; Singles draw – Doubles draw	(Russia) Anna Lapushchenkova; 6–2, 6–2	(Ukraine) Lyudmyla Kichenok	(Russia) Ksenia Pervak (Kazakhstan) Zarina Diyas	(Russia) Nina Bratchikova (Russia) Marta Sirotkina (Russia) Tatiana Kotelinkova (Ukraine) Lesia Tsurenko
March 29	Yugra Cup; Khanty-Mansiysk, Russia; Carpet $50,000; Singles draw – Doubles draw	(Russia) Alexandra Panova (Russia) Ksenia Pervak; 7–6^{(9–7)}, 2–6, [10–7]	(Ukraine) Nadiia Kichenok (Ukraine) Lyudmyla Kichenok	(Russia) Ksenia Pervak (Kazakhstan) Zarina Diyas	(Russia) Nina Bratchikova (Russia) Marta Sirotkina (Russia) Tatiana Kotelinkova (Ukraine) Lesia Tsurenko
March 29	Antalya, Turkey; Clay $10,000; Singles draw – Doubles draw	(Ukraine) Valentyna Ivakhnenko; 6–3, 7–6^{(7–5)}	(Netherlands) Daniëlle Harmsen	(Germany) Julia Babilon (Ukraine) Yuliya Beygelzimer	(France) Stéphanie Vongsouthi (Romania) Raluca Elena Platon (Morocco) Nadia Lalami (Czech Republic) Martina Kubičíkova
March 29	Antalya, Turkey; Clay $10,000; Singles draw – Doubles draw	(Romania) Mihaela Buzărnescu (Bulgaria) Dalia Zafirova; 7–6^{(7–1)}, 7–5	(Czech Republic) Veronika Chvojková (Czech Republic) Martina Kubičíkova	(Germany) Julia Babilon (Ukraine) Yuliya Beygelzimer	(France) Stéphanie Vongsouthi (Romania) Raluca Elena Platon (Morocco) Nadia Lalami (Czech Republic) Martina Kubičíkova
March 29	Torneo Internacional de Tenis Femenino "Conchita Martínez"; Monzón, Spain; Hard $75,000; Singles draw – Doubles draw	(Belarus) Anastasiya Yakimova; 6–4, 4–6, 6–3	(Slovakia) Zuzana Kučová	(Czech Republic) Klára Zakopalová (Italy) Maria Elena Camerin	(Romania) Alexandra Dulgheru (Canada) Stéphanie Dubois (Czech Republic) Sandra Záhlavová (United Kingdom) Anne Keothavong
March 29	Torneo Internacional de Tenis Femenino "Conchita Martínez"; Monzón, Spain; Hard $75,000; Singles draw – Doubles draw	(Romania) Alexandra Dulgheru (Thailand) Tamarine Tanasugarn; 6–2, 6–0	(Indonesia) Yayuk Basuki (United States) Riza Zalameda	(Czech Republic) Klára Zakopalová (Italy) Maria Elena Camerin	(Romania) Alexandra Dulgheru (Canada) Stéphanie Dubois (Czech Republic) Sandra Záhlavová (United Kingdom) Anne Keothavong
March 29	Cairo, Egypt; Clay $10,000; Singles draw – Doubles draw	(South Africa) Chanel Simmonds; 2–6, 6–3, 7–5	(Austria) Tina Schiechtl	(Czech Republic) Lucie Kriegsmannová (Czech Republic) Iveta Gerlová	(Germany) Svenja Weidemann (Georgia (country)) Sofia Kvatsabaia (Netherlands) Marcella Koek (Estonia) Margit Rüütel
March 29	Cairo, Egypt; Clay $10,000; Singles draw – Doubles draw	(Czech Republic) Iveta Gerlová (Czech Republic) Lucie Kriegsmannová; 6–4, 6–3	(Russia) Galina Fokina (Russia) Elina Gasanova	(Czech Republic) Lucie Kriegsmannová (Czech Republic) Iveta Gerlová	(Germany) Svenja Weidemann (Georgia (country)) Sofia Kvatsabaia (Netherlands) Marcella Koek (Estonia) Margit Rüütel
March 29	Nanjing, China; Hard $10,000; Singles draw – Doubles draw	(China) Duan Yingying; 6–4, 7–6^{(8–6)}	(China) Liu Wanting	(China) Liu Shaozhou (China) Zhang Kailin	(China) Guo Lu (France) Élodie Rogge-Dietrich (China) Deng Yaqi (China) Zhao Yijing
March 29	Nanjing, China; Hard $10,000; Singles draw – Doubles draw	(China) Liu Wanting (China) Zhao Yijing; 6–0, 6–4	(China) Lu Jiaxiang (China) Xi Li	(China) Liu Shaozhou (China) Zhang Kailin	(China) Guo Lu (France) Élodie Rogge-Dietrich (China) Deng Yaqi (China) Zhao Yijing

== See also ==
- 2010 ITF Women's Circuit
- 2010 ITF Women's Circuit (April–June)
- 2010 ITF Women's Circuit (July–September)
- 2010 ITF Women's Circuit (October–December)
- 2010 WTA Tour
