= Brugués =

Brugués (Spanish pronunciation: [bɾuˈɣes]) is a Spanish surname. Notable people with the surname include:

- Arnau Brugués Davi (born 1985), retired Spanish tennis player
- Eva Fernández Brugués (born 1986), retired Spanish tennis player
