= Tennis at the 2009 Mediterranean Games =

Champions

Men's singles
- Roberto Bautista Agut; Spain

Women's singles
- Evelyn Mayr; Italy

Men's doubles
- Matteo Marai / Gianluco Naso; Italy

Women's doubles
- Eva Fernandez Brugues / Laura Pous Tio; Spain
- Mediterranean Games

The Tennis Tournament at the 2009 Mediterranean Games was held in the Tennis Club Sports Complex Central in Pescara, Italy.

== Medalists ==
Event	Gold	Silver	Bronze
Men's Singles	(Spain) Roberto Bautista Agut	(Turkey) Marsel İlhan	(Italy) Gianluca Naso
Men's Doubles	(Italy) Marrai / Naso	(Montenegro) Danilović / Tošić	(Spain) Bautista Agut / Granollers Pujol
Women's Singles	(Italy) Evelyn Mayr	(Spain) Laura Pous Tió	(Spain) Eva Fernández Brugués
Women's Doubles	(Spain) Fernández Brugués / Pous Tió	(Turkey) Büyükakçay / Özgen	(Morocco) Lalami / El Allami

== Men's competition ==
=== Singles ===
Quarterfinals
1	(Turkey) Marsel İlhan	7	7
8	(Bosnia and Herzegovina) Aldin Šetkić	5	6
4	(Italy) Gianluca Naso	7	6
6	(Morocco) Reda El Amrani	6	3
-	(Slovenia) Tomislav Ternar	2	4
3	(Italy) Matteo Marrai	6	6
5	(Greece) Alexandros Jakupovic	4	3
2	(Spain) Roberto Bautista Agut	6	6

Semifinals
1	(Turkey) Marsel İlhan	6	6	6
4	(Italy) Gianluca Naso	4	7	4
3	(Italy) Matteo Marrai	2	2
2	(Spain) Roberto Bautista Agut	6	6

Finals
1	(Turkey) Marsel İlhan	4	7	6	2
2	(Spain) Roberto Bautista Agut	6	6	7	6
Third place
4	(Italy) Gianluca Naso	3	7	6
3	(Italy) Matteo Marrai	6	6	4

== Women's competition ==
=== Singles ===
Quarterfinals
1	(Bosnia and Herzegovina) Mervana Jugić-Salkić	4	3
–	(Spain) Laura Pous Tió	6	6
8	(Morocco) Nadia Lalami Laaroussi	1	4
6	(Spain) Astrid Johanna Besser (ret)	6	2
-	(Greece) Despina Papamichail	4	0
4	(Italy) Evelyn Mayr	6	6
5	(Turkey) Çağla Büyükakçay	6	5	3
2	(Spain) Eva Fernández Brugués	4	7	6

Semifinals
-	(Spain) Laura Pous Tió	6	6
8	(Morocco) Nadia Lalami Laaroussi	1	4
4	(Italy) Evelyn Mayr	6	6	6
2	(Spain) Eva Fernández Brugués	1	7	4

Finals
-	(Spain) Laura Pous Tió (ret)	6	6	2
4	(Italy) Evelyn Mayr	2	7	5
Third place
8	(Morocco) Nadia Lalami Laaroussi	4	6	6
2	(Spain) Eva Fernández Brugués	6	3	7
