= Evelyn Mayr =

Italian tennis player

- Country (sports): Italy
- Residence: Italy
- Born: 12 May 1989 (age 35); Lajatico, Italy
- Turned pro: 2006
- Retired: 2013
- Plays: Right-handed (two-handed backhand)
- Prize money: $69,580

Singles
- Career record: 204–138
- Career titles: 7 ITF
- Highest ranking: No. 301 (19 July 2010)

Doubles
- Career record: 76–55
- Career titles: 7 ITF
- Highest ranking: No. 247 (20 September 2010)
Medal record
Representing ITA
Mediterranean Games
Gold medal – first place	2009 Pescara	Singles

Evelyn Mayr (born 12 May 1989) is a former Italian tennis player.

Her career-high singles ranking is world No. 301, achieved on 19 July 2010. On 20 September 2010, she peaked at No. 247 in the doubles rankings. Evelyn is the older sister of former professional player Julia Mayr.

== ITF Circuit finals ==
$25,000 tournaments
$10,000 tournaments

=== Singles: 13 (7 titles, 6 runner-ups) ===
Result	No.	Date	Tournament	Surface	Opponent	Score
Loss	1.	Jul 2007	ITF Garching, Germany	Clay	(Slovakia) Nikola Vajdová	1–6, 1–6
Loss	2.	Aug 2007	ITF Westende, Belgium	Hard	(Poland) Olga Brózda	6–3, 3–6, 0–6
Loss	3.	Sep 2007	ITF Innsbruck, Austria	Clay	(Croatia) Petra Sunić	2–6, 3–6
Win	1.	Feb 2008	ITF Arezzo, Italy	Clay (i)	(Italy) Anastasia Grymalska	6–4, 6–3
Win	2.	Aug 2008	ITF Versmold, Germany	Clay	(Indonesia) Romana Tedjakusuma	5–7, 6–4, 6–3
Win	3.	Sep 2008	ITF Innsbruck, Austria	Clay	(Ukraine) Irina Buryachok	6–1, 2–6, 6–1
Win	4.	Apr 2009	ITF Šibenik, Croatia	Clay	(Italy) Annalisa Bona	7–5, 7–6^{(3)}
Win	5.	Feb 2010	ITF Albufeira, Portugal	Hard	(Bulgaria) Elitsa Kostova	6–4, 6–4
Win	6.	Mar 2010	ITF Antalya, Turkey	Clay	(Italy) Julia Mayr	6–4, 6–2
Loss	4.	Mar 2010	ITF Antalya, Turkey	Clay	(Slovakia) Michaela Pochabová	1–6, 5–7
Loss	5.	Aug 2010	ITF Pörtschach, Austria	Clay	(Italy) Julia Mayr	3–6, 1–6
Win	7.	Apr 2011	ITF Bol, Croatia	Clay	(Germany) Anna-Lena Friedsam	7–6^{(3)}, 6–2
Loss	6.	Oct 2011	ITF Antalya, Turkey	Clay	(Italy) Julia Mayr	1–6, 3–6

=== Doubles: 16 (7–9) ===
Result	No.	Date	Tournament	Surface	Partner	Opponents	Score
Loss	1.	21 July 2007	Garching, Germany	Clay	(Austria) Franziska Klotz	(Georgia (country)) Oksana Kalashnikova (Finland) Katariina Tuohimaa	5–7, 3–6
Win	1.	29 August 2009	Portschach, Austria	Clay	(Italy) Julia Mayr	(Italy) Martina Caciotti (Slovenia) Tina Obrež	6–2, 4–6, [10–6]
Loss	2.	4 September 2009	Bassano del Grappa, Italy	Clay	(Italy) Julia Mayr	(Russia) Marina Shamayko (Georgia (country)) Sofia Shapatava	1–6, 7–5, [8–10]
Loss	3.	24 October 2009	Glasgow, Great Britain	Hard (i)	(Italy) Julia Mayr	(Finland) Emma Laine (United Kingdom) Melanie South	3–6, 2–6
Win	2.	13 February 2010	Vale do Lobo, Portugal	Hard	(Italy) Julia Mayr	(Bosnia and Herzegovina) Sandra Martinović (Switzerland) Lisa Sabino	6–2, 6–1
Loss	4.	13 March 2010	Antalya, Turkey	Clay	(Italy) Julia Mayr	(Romania) Diana Buzean (Romania) Andreea Mitu	7–6^{(3)}, 1–6, [9–11]
Loss	5.	7 August 2010	Monteroni d'Arbia, Italy	Clay	(Italy) Julia Mayr	(Italy) Claudia Giovine (Italy) Valentina Sulpizio	2–6, 6–4, 4–6
Win	3.	28 August 2010	Pörtschach, Austria	Clay	(Italy) Julia Mayr	(Slovenia) Dalila Jakupovič (Italy) Vivienne Vierin	6–4, 6–1
Loss	6.	11 September 2010	Denain, France	Clay	(Italy) Julia Mayr	(Russia) Nadejda Guskova (Ukraine) Maryna Zanevska	2–6, 0–6
Loss	7.	7 March 2011	Madrid, Spain	Clay	(Italy) Julia Mayr	(Italy) Nicole Clerico (Spain) Leticia Costas	0–6, 1–6
Win	4.	14 March 2011	Madrid, Spain	Clay	(Italy) Julia Mayr	(Spain) Lucia Cervera-Vazquez (Italy) Benedetta Davato	6–2, 6–2
Loss	8.	11 April 2011	Bol, Croatia	Clay	(Italy) Julia Mayr	(Czech Republic) Martina Borecká (Czech Republic) Martina Kubiciková	2–6, 4–6
Loss	9.	16 May 2011	Brescia, Italy	Clay	(Italy) Julia Mayr	(Colombia) Karen Castiblanco (Brazil) Fernanda Hermenegildo	6–4, 3–6, 4–6
Win	5.	19 September 2011	Madrid, Spain	Clay	(Italy) Julia Mayr	(Spain) Rocio de la Torre-Sanchez (Spain) Georgina Garcia Perez	6–1, 6–4
Win	6.	3 October 2011	Antalya, Turkey	Clay	(Italy) Julia Mayr	(Netherlands) Anouk Tigu (Netherlands) Bernice van de Velde	7–6^{(5)}, 6–0
Win	7.	19 March 2012	Antalya, Turkey	Clay	(Italy) Julia Mayr	(Italy) Claudia Giovine (Serbia) Teodora Mirčić	6–2, 6–3

== See also ==
- Julia Mayr
- List of female tennis players
