= Julia Mayr =

Italian tennis player

- Country (sports): Italy
- Born: 12 August 1991 (age 33); Lajatico, Italy
- Turned pro: 2008
- Retired: 2013
- Plays: Right-handed (two-handed backhand)
- Prize money: $65,067

Singles
- Career record: 173–101
- Career titles: 8 ITF
- Highest ranking: No. 215 (20 September 2010)

Doubles
- Career record: 86–49
- Career titles: 12 ITF
- Highest ranking: No. 225 (29 August 2011)

Julia Mayr (born 12 August 1991) is a former Italian tennis player. She is the younger sister of former professional player Evelyn Mayr.

Mayr won eight singles and 12 doubles titles on the ITF Circuit. On 20 September 2010, she reached her best singles ranking of world No. 215. On 29 August 2011, she peaked at No. 225 in the doubles rankings.

== ITF Circuit finals ==
$25,000 tournaments
$15,000 tournaments
$10,000 tournaments

=== Singles: 14 (8–6) ===
Result	No.	Date	Tournament	Surface	Opponent	Score
Loss	1.	Jul 2008	ITF Imola, Italy	Carpet	(Italy) Giulia Gatto-Monticone	2–6, 1–6
Win	1.	Aug 2009	ITF Gardone Val Trompia, Italy	Clay	(Italy) Anna Remondina	6–0, 6–0
Win	2.	Aug 2009	ITF Innsbruck, Austria	Clay	(Italy) Alexia Virgili	6–2, 6–0
Loss	2.	Sep 2009	ITF Bassano del Grappa, Italy	Clay	(Italy) Alice Moroni	6–7^{(1–7)}, 1–6
Win	3.	Feb 2010	ITF Vale do Lobo, Portugal	Hard	(Portugal) Maria João Koehler	6–1, 6–1
Loss	3.	Mar 2010	ITF Antalya, Turkey	Clay	(Italy) Evelyn Mayr	4–6, 2–6
Win	4.	Mar 2010	ITF Antalya, Turkey	Clay	(Spain) María Teresa Torró Flor	6–2, 6–1
Loss	4.	Aug 2010	ITS Cup, Czech Republic	Clay	(Austria) Patricia Mayr-Achleitner	2–6, 4–6
Win	5.	Aug 2010	ITF Pörtschach, Austria	Clay	(Italy) Evelyn Mayr	6–3, 6–1
Win	6.	Mar 2011	ITF Madrid, Spain	Clay (i)	(Italy) Giulia Sussarello	3–6, 6–2, 6–2
Loss	5.	Sep 2011	ITF Madrid, Spain	Hard	(Spain) Rocio de la Torre-Sanchez	6–4, 2–6, 5–7
Win	7.	Oct 2011	ITF Antalya, Turkey	Clay	(Italy) Evelyn Mayr	6–1, 6–3
Loss	6.	Jul 2012	ITF Imola, Italy	Carpet	(Italy) Federica Di Sarra	4–6, 2–6
Win	8.	Jul 2012	ITF Bad Waltersdorf, Austria	Clay	(Czech Republic) Zuzana Zalabská	6–3, 6–3

=== Doubles: 20 (12–8) ===
Outcome	No.	Date	Tournament	Surface	Partner	Opponents	Score
Winner	1.	15 August 2009	Innsbruck, Austria	Clay	(Ukraine) Irina Buryachok	(France) Chloé Babet (Italy) Valentine Confalonieri	6–1, 6–7^{(2–7)}, [10–8]
Winner	2.	29 August 2009	Pörtschach, Austria	Clay	(Italy) Evelyn Mayr	(Italy) Martina Caciotti (Slovenia) Tina Obrež	6–2, 4–6, [10–6]
Runner-up	1.	4 September 2009	Bassano del Grappa, Italy	Clay	(Italy) Evelyn Mayr	(Russia) Marina Shamayko (Georgia (country)) Sofia Shapatava	1–6, 7–5, [8–10]
Runner-up	2.	24 October 2009	Glasgow, Great Britain	Hard (i)	(Italy) Evelyn Mayr	(Finland) Emma Laine (United Kingdom) Melanie South	3–6, 2–6
Winner	3.	13 February 2010	Vale do Lobo, Portugal	Hard	(Italy) Evelyn Mayr	(Bosnia and Herzegovina) Sandra Martinović (Switzerland) Lisa Sabino	6–2, 6–1
Runner-up	3.	13 March 2010	Antalya, Turkey	Clay	(Italy) Evelyn Mayr	(Romania) Diana Buzean (Romania) Andreea Mitu	7–6^{(7–3)}, 1–6, [9–11]
Runner-up	4.	7 August 2010	Monteroni d'Arbia, Italy	Clay	(Italy) Evelyn Mayr	(Italy) Claudia Giovine (Italy) Valentina Sulpizio	2–6, 6–4, 4–6
Winner	4.	28 August 2010	Pörtschach, Austria	Clay	(Italy) Evelyn Mayr	(Slovenia) Dalila Jakupovič (Italy) Vivienne Vierin	6–4, 6–1
Runner-up	5.	11 September 2010	Denain, France	Clay	(Italy) Evelyn Mayr	(Russia) Nadejda Guskova (Ukraine) Maryna Zanevska	2–6, 0–6
Winner	5.	23 October 2010	Glasgow, Great Britain	Hard (i)	(Denmark) Karen Barbat	(Greece) Eirini Georgatou (Russia) Valeria Savinykh	w/o
Runner-up	6.	12 March 2011	Madrid, Spain	Clay	(Italy) Evelyn Mayr	(Italy) Nicole Clerico (Spain) Leticia Costas	0–6, 1–6
Winner	6.	19 March 2011	Madrid, Spain	Clay (i)	(Italy) Evelyn Mayr	(Spain) Lucia Cervera-Vazquez (Italy) Benedetta Davato	6–2, 6–2
Runner-up	7.	17 April 2011	Bol, Croatia	Clay	(Italy) Evelyn Mayr	(Czech Republic) Martina Borecká (Czech Republic) Martina Kubiciková	2–6, 4–6
Runner-up	8.	21 May 2011	Brescia, Italy	Clay	(Italy) Evelyn Mayr	(Colombia) Karen Castiblanco (Brazil) Fernanda Hermenegildo	6–4, 3–6, 4–6
Winner	7.	14 August 2011	Versmold, Germany	Clay	(Ukraine) Elizaveta Ianchuk	(Chile) Cecilia Costa Melgar (Chile) Daniela Seguel	6–4, 6–3
Winner	8.	24 September 2011	Madrid, Spain	Hard	(Italy) Evelyn Mayr	(Spain) Rocio de la Torre-Sanchez (Spain) Georgina Garcia Perez	6–1, 6–4
Winner	9.	8 October 2011	Antalya, Turkey	Clay	(Italy) Evelyn Mayr	(Netherlands) Anouk Tigu (Netherlands) Bernice van de Velde	7–6^{(7–5)}, 6–0
Winner	10.	25 March 2012	Antalya, Turkey	Clay	(Italy) Evelyn Mayr	(Italy) Claudia Giovine (Serbia) Teodora Mirčić	6–2, 6–3
Winner	11.	24 June 2012	Cologne, Germany	Clay	(Bulgaria) Dalia Zafirova	(Brazil) Nathalia Rossi (Argentina) Carolina Zeballos	6–1, 6–1
Winner	12.	6 July 2012	Rovereto, Italy	Clay	(France) Estelle Guisard	(Romania) Diana Buzean (Netherlands) Danielle Harmsen	6–3, 6–3

== See also ==
- Evelyn Mayr
