= Marina Shamayko =

Russian tennis player

Marina Shamayko Марина Шамайко
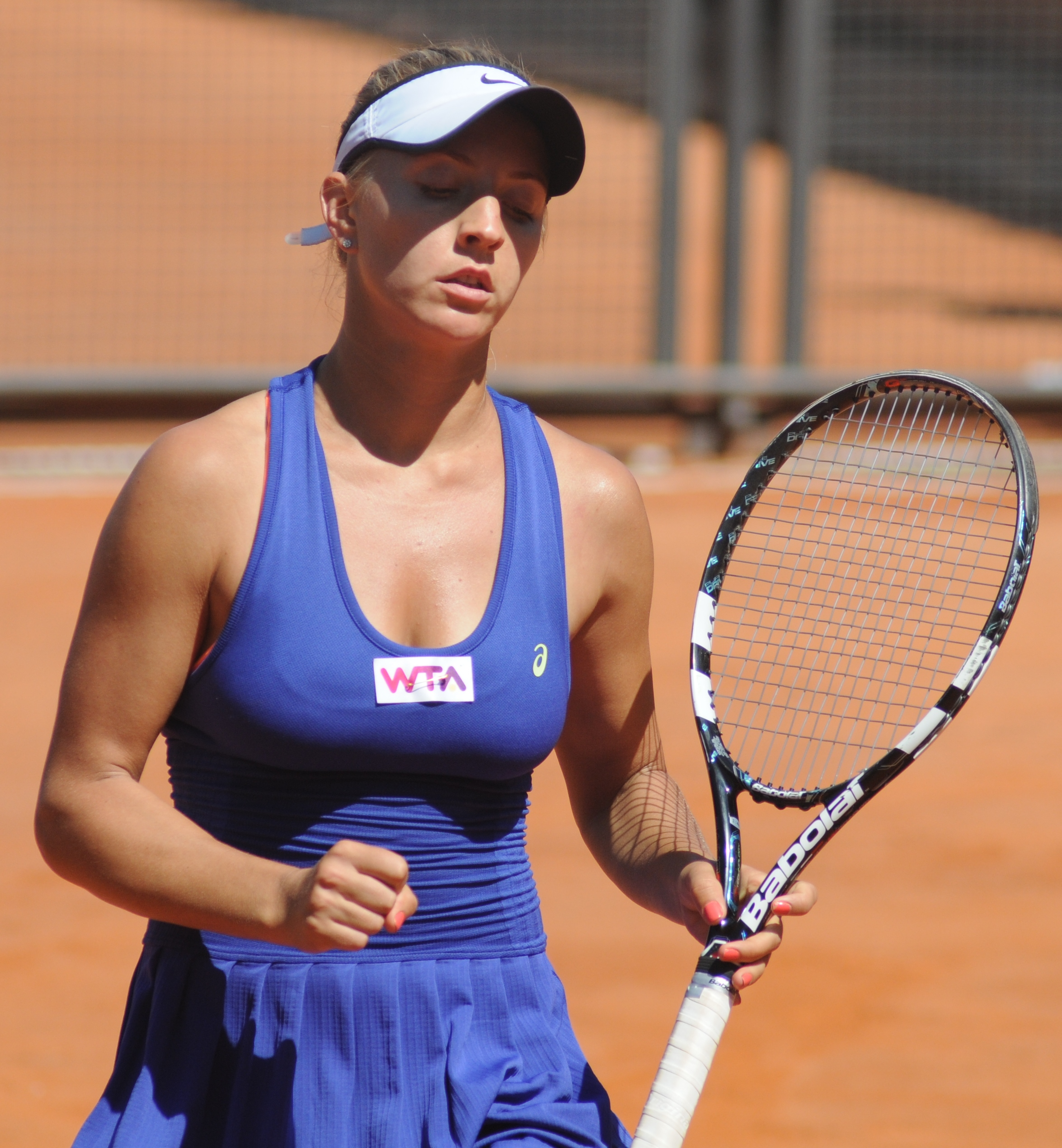
- Shamayko in 2014
- Country (sports): Russia
- Born: 3 August 1987 (age 38)
- Turned pro: 2003
- Plays: Right-handed
- Prize money: $141,723

Singles
- Career record: 306–325
- Career titles: 1 ITF
- Highest ranking: No. 317 (30 September 2013)

Doubles
- Career record: 169–215
- Career titles: 5 ITF
- Highest ranking: No. 197 (14 July 2008)

Marina Valeryevna Shamayko (Russian: Марина Валерьевна Шамайко, born 3 August 1987) is a Russian former tennis player.

On 30 September 2013, she reached her career-high singles ranking of world No. 317. On 14 July 2008, she peaked at No. 197 in the doubles rankings. In her career, Shamayko won one singles title and five doubles titles on the ITF Women's Circuit.

== ITF finals ==
=== Singles: 5 (1–4) ===
$100,000 tournaments
$75,000 tournaments
$50,000 tournaments
$25,000 tournaments
$15,000 tournaments
$10,000 tournaments

| Outcome | No. | Date | Tournament | Surface | Opponent | Score |
|---|---|---|---|---|---|---|
| Runner-up | 1. | 30 March 2004 | Cairo, Egypt | Clay | (Switzerland) Gaëlle Widmer | 6–3, 4–6, 6–7 |
| Runner-up | 2. | 28 March 2006 | Rome, Italy | Clay | (Italy) Anna Floris | 3–6, 0–6 |
| Runner-up | 3. | 22 October 2012 | Monastir, Tunisia | Hard | (Turkey) Başak Eraydın | 2–6, 6–7 |
| Winner | 1. | 11 February 2013 | Sharm El Sheikh, Egypt | Hard | (Austria) Barbara Haas | 4–6, 6–3, 6–3 |
| Runner-up | 4. | 25 July 2016 | Viserba, Italy | Clay | (Italy) Alice Balducci | 3–6, 2–6 |

=== Doubles: 28 (5–23) ===
| Outcome | No. | Date | Tournament | Surface | Partner | Opponents | Score |
|---|---|---|---|---|---|---|---|
| Runner-up | 1. | 23 August 2005 | Trecastagni, Italy | Hard | (Russia) Regina Kulikova | (New Zealand) Leanne Baker (Italy) Francesca Lubiani | 2–6, 6–4, 3–6 |
| Winner | 1. | 18 December 2005 | Bergamo, Italy | Carpet (i) | (Russia) Ekaterina Bychkova | (Italy) Valentina Sassi (Italy) Francesca Lubiani | 6–1, 6–3 |
| Runner-up | 2. | 1 October 2006 | Batumi, Georgia | Hard | (Russia) Vasilisa Davydova | (Czech Republic) Petra Cetkovská (Turkey) İpek Şenoğlu | 4–6, 6–3, 4–6 |
| Runner-up | 3. | 17 September 2007 | Telavi, Georgia | Clay | (Russia) Vasilisa Davydova | (Germany) Ria Sabay (Kyrgyzstan) Ksenia Palkina | 2–6, 2–6 |
| Runner-up | 4. | 30 September 2007 | Batumi, Georgia | Hard | (Russia) Vasilisa Davydova | (Romania) Mihaela Buzărnescu (Serbia) Vojislava Lukić | 2–6, 4–6 |
| Runner-up | 5. | 24 March 2008 | Moscow, Russia | Hard | (Georgia (country)) Sofia Shapatava | (Russia) Anastasia Pavlyuchenkova (Czech Republic) Nikola Fraňková | 3–6, 2–6 |
| Runner-up | 6. | 6 July 2008 | Cuneo, Italy | Clay | (Ukraine) Olga Savchuk | (Czech Republic) Renata Voráčová (Estonia) Maret Ani | 1–6, 2–6 |
| Runner-up | 7. | 17 November 2008 | Astana, Kazakhstan | Hard | (Georgia (country)) Sofia Shapatava | (Russia) Marina Melnikova (Russia) Anastasia Poltoratskaya | 1–6, 1–6 |
| Runner-up | 8. | 28 March 2009 | Latina, Italy | Clay | (Russia) Ekaterina Lopes | (Hungary) Katalin Marosi (Brazil) Marina Tavares | 2–6, 0–6 |
| Runner-up | 9. | 5 April 2009 | Latina, Italy | Clay | (Italy) Emily Stellato | (Italy) Alberta Brianti (Germany) Julia Schruff | 1–6, 4–6 |
| Runner-up | 10. | 28 June 2009 | Turin, Italy | Clay | (Italy) Benedetta Davato | (Uzbekistan) Alina Baronova (Russia) Karina Pimkina | 4–6, 2–6 |
| Runner-up | 11. | 10 August 2009 | Moscow, Russia | Clay | (Russia) Valeria Savinykh | (Russia) Ekaterina Lopes (Australia) Arina Rodionova | 3–6, 3–6 |
| Winner | 2. | 31 August 2009 | Bassano del Grappa, Italy | Clay | (Georgia (country)) Sofia Shapatava | (Italy) Evelyn Mayr (Italy) Julia Mayr | 6–1, 5–7, [10–8] |
| Winner | 3. | 28 September 2009 | Ciampino, Italy | Clay | (Bosnia and Herzegovina) Sandra Martinović | (Italy) Stefania Chieppa (Italy) Valentina Sulpizio | 7–6, 6–4 |
| Runner-up | 12. | 7 March 2010 | Madrid, Spain | Clay | (Serbia) Neda Kozić | (Italy) Elisa Balsamo (Italy) Valentina Sulpizio | 3–6, 6–7^{(3–7)} |
| Runner-up | 13. | 16 April 2010 | San Severo, Italy | Clay | (Russia) Karina Pimkina | (Italy) Gioia Barbieri (Italy) Anastasia Grymalska | 6–4, 2–6, [9–11] |
| Runner-up | 14. | 21 May 2010 | Moscow, Russia | Clay | (Serbia) Aleksandra Krunić | (Russia) Anna Arina Marenko (Russia) Ekaterina Yakovleva | 2–6, 2–6 |
| Runner-up | 15. | 16 October 2010 | Kharkiv, Ukraine | Clay | (Romania) Mihaela Buzărnescu | (Ukraine) Anna Piven (Ukraine) Anastasiya Vasylyeva | 4–6, 4–6 |
| Winner | 4. | 12 February 2011 | Antalya, Turkey | Clay | (Serbia) Teodora Mirčić | (Turkey) Sultan Gönen (Ukraine) Anna Karavayeva | 6–4, 6–4 |
| Runner-up | 16. | 21 February 2011 | Antalya, Turkey | Hard | (Russia) Olga Panova | (China) Tian Ran (China) Liang Chen | 7–6^{(7–2)}, 5–7, [9–11] |
| Runner-up | 17. | 26 March 2011 | Namangan, Uzbekistan | Hard | (Russia) Ekaterina Bychkova | (Uzbekistan) Albina Khabibulina (Uzbekistan) Nigina Abduraimova | 6–4, 6–7^{(3–7)}, [8–10] |
| Runner-up | 18. | 11 April 2011 | Pomezia, Italy | Clay | (Switzerland) Conny Perrin | (Romania) Diana Buzean (Italy) Karin Knapp | 6–7^{(3–7)}, 2–6 |
| Runner-up | 19. | 20 June 2011 | Rome, Italy | Clay | (Georgia (country)) Sofia Shapatava | (Paraguay) Verónica Cepede Royg (Argentina) Paula Ormaechea | 5–7, 4–6 |
| Runner-up | 20. | 29 August 2011 | Mamaia, Romania | Clay | (Georgia (country)) Sofia Shapatava | (Romania) Elena Bogdan (Romania) Alexandra Cadanțu | 2–6, 2–6 |
| Runner-up | 21. | 21 April 2012 | Civitavecchia, Italy | Clay | (Italy) Claudia Giovine | (Romania) Raluca Olaru (Romania) Elena Bogdan | 3–6, 5–7 |
| Runner-up | 22. | 5 April 2013 | Dijon, France | Hard (i) | (Bulgaria) Elitsa Kostova | (Italy) Nicole Clerico (Italy) Giulia Gatto-Monticone | 4–6, 2–6 |
| Runner-up | 23. | 31 March 2014 | Medellín, Colombia | Clay | (Australia) Monique Adamczak | (Romania) Irina-Camelia Begu (Argentina) María Irigoyen | 2–6, 6–7 |
| Winner | 5. | 10 June 2016 | Madrid, Spain | Clay | (France) Jessika Ponchet | (Spain) Ainhoa Atucha Gómez (Spain) María José Luque Moreno | 6–2, 6–3 |
