= Nicole Clerico =

Italian tennis player

- Country (sports): Italy
- Born: 8 March 1983 (age 42); Cuneo, Italy
- Height: 1.73 m (5 ft 8 in)
- Turned pro: 1999
- Retired: 2015
- Plays: Right (two-handed backhand)
- Prize money: $121,158

Singles
- Career record: 243–318
- Career titles: 0
- Highest ranking: No. 381 (21 September 2009)

Doubles
- Career record: 329–265
- Career titles: 27 ITF
- Highest ranking: No. 171 (11 October 2010)

Nicole Clerico (Italian pronunciation: [niˌkɔl ˈklɛːriko, – ˈkleː-]; born 8 March 1983) is an Italian former tennis player.

On 21 September 2009, she reached her highest singles ranking of world No. 381. On 11 October 2010, she peaked at No. 171 in the WTA doubles rankings.

Clerico, who started playing tennis at the age of 8, was coached by Matteo Costa. In her career, she won 27 doubles titles on the ITF Women's Circuit.

In 2015, Clerico retired from professional tennis.

== ITF finals ==
=== Singles: 3 (3 runner-ups) ===
Legend $25,000 tournaments $10,000 tournaments	Finals by surface Hard (0–2) Clay (0–1)

Result	Date	Tournament	Tier	Surface	Opponent	Score
Loss	Aug 2005	ITF Guayaquil, Ecuador	10,000	Hard	(Russia) Angelina Gabueva	2–6, 6–4, 4–6
Loss	Aug 2009	ITF Trecastagni, Italy	10,000	Hard	(Spain) Paula Fondevila Castro	4–6, 5–7
Loss	Sep 2009	ITF Brčko, Bosnia & Herzegovina	10,000	Clay	(North Macedonia) Aleksandra Josifoska	6–4, 3–6, 3–6

=== Doubles: 71 (27–44) ===
Legend $50,000 tournaments $25,000 tournaments $15,000 tournaments $10,000 tournaments	Finals by surface Hard (7–12) Clay (16–29) Grass (0–1) Carpet (4–2)

Result	No.	Date	Tournament	Surface	Partnering	Opponents	Score
Loss	1.	25 August 2002	ITF Civitanova, Italy	Clay	(Russia) Irina Smirnova	(Italy) Silvia Disderi (Romania) Oana Elena Golimbioschi	3–6, 2–6
Loss	2.	24 August 2003	ITF Bucharest, Romania	Clay	(Russia) Irina Smirnova	(Russia) Anna Bastrikova (Russia) Elena Vesnina	1–6, 1–6
Win	1.	7 November 2004	ITF Rome, Italy	Clay	(Italy) Stefania Chieppa	(Italy) Valentina Sulpizio (Czech Republic) Sandra Záhlavová	3–6, 6–4, 6–2
Win	2.	2 October 2005	ITF Volos, Greece	Carpet	(Finland) Katariina Tuohimaa	(Hungary) Katalin Marosi (Brazil) Marina Tavares	6–4, 6–2
Loss	3.	16 October 2005	ITF Castel Gandolfo, Italy	Clay	(Italy) Stefania Chieppa	(Belarus) Alena Bayarchyk (Russia) Alexandra Karavaeva	2–6, 2–6
Loss	4.	29 October 2005	ITF Mumbai, India	Hard	(Kyrgyzstan) Ksenia Palkina	(Thailand) Wilawan Choptang (Thailand) Thassha Vitayaviroj	7–5, 5–7, 3–6
Win	3.	6 November 2005	Pune Championships, India	Hard	(Kyrgyzstan) Ksenia Palkina	(India) Rushmi Chakravarthi (India) Sai Jayalakshmy Jayaram	7–5, 7–6^{(7)}
Win	4.	28 January 2006	ITF New Delhi, India	Hard	(Kyrgyzstan) Ksenia Palkina	(India) Ankita Bhambri (India) Rushmi Chakravarthi	w/o
Loss	5.	4 February 2006	ITF Muzaffarnagar, India	Grass	(Kyrgyzstan) Ksenia Palkina	(Singapore) Lee Wei-ping (Indonesia) Lavinia Tananta	w/o
Loss	6.	9 June 2006	ITF Haskovo, Bulgaria	Clay	(Bulgaria) Dia Evtimova	(Portugal) Rita Esteves de Freitas (Serbia and Montenegro) Neda Kozić	4–6, 4–6
Win	5.	11 July 2006	ITF Imola, Italy	Carpet	(Kyrgyzstan) Ksenia Palkina	(Romania) Maria Luiza Craciun (Italy) Elena Vianello	6–3, 6–0
Win	6.	29 September 2006	ITF Thessaloniki, Greece	Clay	(Russia) Alexandra Panova	(Switzerland) Amra Sadiković (Switzerland) Stefanie Vögele	4–6, 2–6
Loss	7.	6 October 2006	ITF Volos, Greece	Carpet	(Greece) Anna Koumantou	(Austria) Franziska Klotz (Austria) Patricia Mayr	6–4, 6–7^{(5)}, 3–6
Loss	8.	19 November 2006	Pune Championships, India	Clay	(Kyrgyzstan) Ksenia Palkina	(Russia) Olga Panova (Romania) Ágnes Szatmári	2–6, 4–6
Loss	9.	3 March 2007	ITF Sant Boi, Spain	Clay	(Kyrgyzstan) Ksenia Palkina	(Spain) Irene Rehberger Bescos (Spain) Nuria Sánchez García	6–4, 3–6, 4–6
Loss	10.	10 March 2007	ITF Sabadell, Spain	Clay	(France) Violette Huck	(Spain) Nuria Sánchez García (Italy) Verdiana Verardi	3–6, 6–7^{(5)}
Loss	11.	18 May 2007	ITF Trivandrum, India	Clay	(Romania) Ágnes Szatmári	(United States) Lauren Albanese (Belgium) Yanina Wickmayer	6–3, 5–7, 1–6
Loss	12.	9 Jul 2007	ITF Imola, Italy	Carpet	(France) Nadege Vergos	(Italy) Alice Balducci (Switzerland) Lisa Sabino	1–6, 4–6
Win	7.	10 August 2007	ITF Wrexham, UK	Hard	(Italy) Verdiana Verardi	(United Kingdom) Katharina Brown (India) Tara Iyer	6–4, 6–3
Win	8.	18 August 2007	ITF Savitaipale, Finland	Clay	(Belgium) Davinia Lobbinger	(Netherlands) Marcella Koek (Russia) Marina Melnikova	7–6^{(4)}, 7–5
Loss	13.	25 August 2007	ITF Trecastagni, Italy	Hard	(Switzerland) Lisa Sabino	(Italy) Valentina Sassi (Italy) Valentina Sulpizio	6–4, 4–6, 5–7
Win	9.	29 September 2007	ITF Thessaloniki, Greece	Clay	(Greece) Anna Koumantou	(Poland) Olga Brózda (Poland) Sylwia Zagórska	4–6, 6–4, [11–9]
Loss	14.	6 October 2007	ITF Mytilini, Greece	Hard	(Greece) Anna Koumantou	(Poland) Olga Brózda (Poland) Magdalena Kiszczyńska	2–6, 6–7^{(3)}
Loss	15.	10 November 2007	ITF Jounieh, Lebanon	Clay	(Brazil) Teliana Pereira	(Poland) Olga Brózda (Russia) Maria Kondratieva	3–6, 1–6
Win	10.	25 November 2007	ITF Sintra, Portugal	Clay	(Brazil) Teliana Pereira	(Brazil) Joana Cortez (Brazil) Roxane Vaisemberg	6–4, 6–2
Win	11.	22 February 2008	ITF Melilla, Spain	Hard	(Italy) Martina Caciotti	(Spain) Melisa Cabrera-Handt (Poland) Monika Krauze	3–6, 7–6^{(5)}, [10–8]
Win	12.	15 March 2008	ITF Ramat HaSharon, Israel	Hard	(United States) Lena Litvak	(United States) Katie Ruckert (Belgium) Aude Vermoezen	6–3, 6–1
Loss	16.	21 March 2008	ITF Porto Rafti, Greece	Hard	(Slovenia) Mika Urbančič	(Israel) Julia Glushko (Germany) Dominice Ripoll	6–1, 5–7, [7–10]
Loss	17.	7 April 2008	ITF Šibenik, Croatia	Hard	(Italy) Giorgia Mortello	(Poland) Karolina Kosińska (Czech Republic) Darina Sedenková	6–7, 6–7, [8–10]
Loss	18.	13 June 2008	ITF Campobasso, Italy	Clay	(Australia) Jessica Moore	(Argentina) María Irigoyen (Brazil) Roxane Vaisemberg	3–6, 2–6
Loss	19.	12 July 2008	ITF Bogotá, Colombia	Clay	(Argentina) Mailen Auroux	(Colombia) Mariana Duque Marino (Colombia) Viky Núñez Fuentes	3–6, 4–6
Win	13.	22 September 2008	ITF Volos, Greece	Carpet	(Slovenia) Mika Urbančič	(Switzerland) Milica Tomić (Poland) Justyna Jegiołka	6–2, 6–1
Loss	20.	6 October 2008	ITF Reggio Calabria, Italy	Clay	(Austria) Patricia Mayr-Achleitner	(Italy) Anna Floris (Italy) Valentina Sulpizio	2–6, 3–6
Loss	21.	23 March 2009	ITF Gonesse, France	Clay	(Italy) Martina Caciotti	(Poland) Magdalena Kiszczyńska (Poland) Olga Brózda	1–6, 2–6
Win	14.	25 April 2009	ITF Torrent, Spain	Clay	(Italy) Martina Caciotti	(Spain) Carla Roset Franco (Spain) Lara Arruabarrena	7–5, 0–6, [11–9]
Loss	22.	4 May 2009	ITF Florence, Italy	Clay	(Slovakia) Klaudia Boczová	(France) Kinnie Laisné (France) Stephanie Vongsouthi	0–6, 1–6
Loss	23.	18 July 2009	ITF Bogotá, Colombia	Clay	(Brazil) Maria Fernanda Alves	(Colombia) Karen Castiblanco (Colombia) Paula Zabala	6–1, 1–6, [7–10]
Loss	24.	3 August 2009	ITF Monteroni, Italy	Clay	(Georgia (country)) Margalita Chakhnashvili	(Austria) Sandra Klemenschits (Austria) Patricia Mayr	3–6, 4–6
Win	15.	10 October 2009	Royal Cup, Montenegro	Clay	(Poland) Karolina Kosińska	(Serbia) Ana Jovanović (Serbia) Teodora Mirčić	6–7^{(4)}, 6–4, [10–4]
Loss	25.	26 October 2009	ITF Pretoria, South Africa	Hard	(Italy) Martina Caciotti	(United States) Erica Krisan (South Africa) Welma Luus	1–6, 4–6
Win	16.	16 November 2009	Pune Championships, India	Hard	(Ukraine) Anastasiya Vasylyeva	(Russia) Nina Bratchikova (Kyrgyzstan) Ksenia Palkina	4–6, 6–3, [13–11]
Loss	26.	16 January 2010	GB Pro-Series Glasgow, UK	Hard (i)	(Romania) Liana Ungur	(France) Victoria Larrière (United Kingdom) Anna Smith	4–6, 4–6
Win	17.	12 February 2010	ITF Eilat, Israel	Hard	(Italy) Martina Caciotti	(Russia) Renata Bakieva (South Africa) Yanina Darishina	6–1, 6–3
Loss	27.	26 March 2010	ITF Fujairah, United Arab Emirates	Hard	(Italy) Martina Caciotti	(Oman) Fatma Al-Nabhani (Portugal) Magali de Lattre	6–2, 6–7^{(5)}, [8–10]
Loss	28.	14 May 2010	ITF Caserta, Italy	Hard	(Canada) Rebecca Marino	(Belarus) Ekaterina Dzehalevich (France) Irena Pavlovic	3–6, 3–6
Loss	29.	3 July 2010	ITF Sarajevo, Bosnia & Herzegovina	Clay	(Poland) Karolina Kosińska	(Ukraine) Irina Buryachok (France) Irena Pavlovic	1–6, 1–6
Loss	30.	20 June 2010	ITF Lenzerheide, Switzerland	Clay	(Italy) Martina Caciotti	(Poland) Olga Brózda (Poland) Sylwia Zagórska	6–4, 1–6, [5–10]
Win	18.	18 July 2010	ITF Imola, Italy	Carpet	(Italy) Maria Masini	(Italy) Gioia Barbieri (Argentina) María-Belén Corbalán	6–4, 6–1
Win	19.	14 August 2010	ITF Koksijde, Belgium	Clay	(Germany) Justine Ozga	(Spain) Lara Arruabarrena (Spain) María Teresa Torró Flor	5–7, 6–4, [10–6]
Loss	31.	30 October 2010	ITF Monastir, Tunisia	Hard	(Italy) Indra Bigi	(Netherlands) Kim Kilsdonk (Netherlands) Nicolette van Uitert	3–6, 2–6
Loss	32.	3 December 2010	ITF Ain Sukhna, Egypt	Clay	(Italy) Indra Bigi	(Russia) Galina Fokina (Russia) Marina Melnikova	3–6, 6–2, [11–13]
Win	20.	24 January 2011	ITF Kolkata, India	Clay	(Slovenia) Dalila Jakupović	(India) Ankita Raina (India) Poojashree Venkatesha	6–3, 6–1
Loss	33.	18 February 2011	ITF Aurangabad, India	Hard	(Italy) Maria Masini	(Thailand) Varunya Wongteanchai (Thailand) Varatchaya Wongteanchai	6–4, 2–6, [6–10]
Win	21.	12 March 2011	ITF Madrid, Spain	Clay	(Spain) Leticia Costas	(Italy) Evelyn Mayr (Italy) Julia Mayr	6–0, 6–1
Loss	34.	7 May 2011	ITF Gran Canaria, Spain	Clay	(Italy) Martina Caciotti	(Mexico) Ximena Hermoso (Mexico) Ivette López	2–6, 3–6
Loss	35.	3 June 2011	ITF Florence, Italy	Clay	(Italy) Valentina Sulpizio	(Romania) Mihaela Buzărnescu (Slovakia) Zuzana Zlochová	3–6, 4–6
Loss	36.	22 July 2011	ITF Les Contamines-Montjoie, France	Hard	(Croatia) Maria Abramović	(France) Julie Coin (Czech Republic) Eva Hrdinová	3–6, 2–6
Win	22.	30 July 2011	ITF Bad Saulgau, Germany	Clay	(Croatia) Maria Abramović	(Colombia) Catalina Castaño (Colombia) Mariana Duque-Marino	6–3, 5–7, [10–7]
Loss	37.	20 August 2011	ITF Brčko, Bosnia & Herzegovina	Clay	(Italy) Maria Masini	(Croatia) Silvia Njirić (Slovakia) Zuzana Zlochová	4–6, 3–6
Loss	38.	29 October 2011	ITF Netanya, Israel	Hard	(Israel) Julia Glushko	(Turkey) Çağla Büyükakçay (Turkey) Pemra Özgen	5–7, 3–6
Loss	39.	23 January 2012	ITF Coimbra, Portugal	Hard	(Italy) Martina Caciotti	(Slovakia) Lucia Butkovská (Norway) Ulrikke Eikeri	3–6, 0–6
Win	23.	16 April 2012	ITF Bol, Croatia	Clay	(France) Anaïs Laurendon	(Czech Republic) Jesika Malečková (Czech Republic) Tereza Smitková	6–2, 6–0
Loss	40.	7 May 2012	ITF Florence, Italy	Clay	(France) Anaïs Laurendon	(Italy) Gioia Barbieri (Romania) Andreea Văideanu	2–6, 7–6, [8–10]
Win	24.	17 September 2012	Royal Cup, Montenegro	Clay	(Germany) Anna Zaja	(Argentina) Mailen Auroux (Argentina) María Irigoyen	4–6, 6–3, [11–9]
Loss	41.	15 October 2012	GB Pro-Series Glasgow, UK	Hard (i)	(Germany) Anna Zaja	(Poland) Justyna Jegiołka (Latvia) Diāna Marcinkēviča	2–6, 1–6
Loss	42.	4 February 2013	Open de l'Isère, France	Hard (i)	(Spain) Leticia Costas	(Russia) Maria Kondratieva (Czech Republic) Renata Voráčová	1–6, 4–6
Win	25.	5 April 2013	ITF Dijon, France	Hard (i)	(Italy) Giulia Gatto-Monticone	(Russia) Marina Shamayko (Bulgaria) Elitsa Kostova	6–4, 6–2
Loss	43.	22 April 2013	Chiasso Open, Switzerland	Clay	(Italy) Giulia Gatto-Monticone	(Belarus) Aliaksandra Sasnovich (Latvia) Diāna Marcinkēviča	7–6, 4–6, [7–10]
Win	26.	22 July 2013	ITF Les Contamines-Montjoie, France	Hard	(Czech Republic) Nikola Fraňková	(France) Amandine Hesse (Argentina) Vanesa Furlanetto	3–6, 7–6^{(5)}, [10–8]
Loss	44.	14 October 2013	Open de Limoges, France	Hard (i)	(Czech Republic) Nikola Fraňková	(Poland) Magda Linette (Switzerland) Viktorija Golubic	4–6, 4–6
Win	27.	28 February 2014	ITF Beinasco, Italy	Clay (i)	(Italy) Giulia Gatto-Monticone	(United Kingdom) Anna Smith (United Kingdom) Jocelyn Rae	6–1, 5–7, [13–11]
