= Eva Fernández Brugués =

Spanish tennis player (born 1986)

- Country (sports): Spain
- Residence: Figueres, Spain
- Born: 5 May 1986 (age 39); Figueres
- Height: 1.63 m (5 ft 4 in)
- Turned pro: 2001
- Retired: 2014
- Plays: Right-handed (two-handed backhand)
- Prize money: US$ 129,897

Singles
- Career record: 301–246
- Career titles: 7 ITF
- Highest ranking: No. 185 (19 October 2009)

Grand Slam singles results
- French Open: Q1 (2010)
- US Open: Q1 (2009, 2010)

Doubles
- Career record: 52–81
- Career titles: 2 ITF
- Highest ranking: No. 336 (12 September 2011)
Medal record
Mediterranean Games
Gold medal – first place	2009 Pescara	Women's doubles
Bronze medal – third place	2009 Pescara	Women's singles

Eva Fernández Brugués (Spanish pronunciation: [ˈeβa feɾˈnandeθ βɾuˈɣes]; (Note: In isolation, Brugués is pronounced [bɾuˈɣes].) born 5 May 1986) is a Spanish former tennis player.

On 19 October 2009, she reached her highest singles ranking of world No. 185 whilst her best doubles ranking by the Women's Tennis Association (WTA) was 336 on 12 September 2011. She won seven ITF tournaments and two in doubles.

She won a gold and a bronze medal in the 2009 Mediterranean Games at Pescara.

== ITF Circuit finals ==
Legend
$100,000 tournaments
$75,000 tournaments
$50,000 tournaments
$25,000 tournaments
$10,000 tournaments

=== Singles: 15 (7–8) ===
Result	No.	Date	Tournament	Surface	Opponent	Score
Loss	1.	29 September 2002	ITF Lleida, Spain	Clay	(Spain) María José Sánchez Alayeto	7–5, 3–6, 0–6
Win	2.	29 October 2005	ITF Quartu Sant'Elena, Italy	Hard	(Czech Republic) Renata Kučerková	6–1, 6–1
Win	3.	20 August 2006	ITF Savitaipale, Finland	Clay	(Finland) Piia Suomalainen	6–4, 3–6, 6–2
Loss	4.	24 September 2006	ITF Ciampino, Italy	Clay	(Italy) Alexia Virgili	1–6, 3–6
Loss	5.	19 November 2006	ITF Mallorca, Spain	Clay	(Netherlands) Michelle Gerards	1–6, 3–6
Loss	6.	25 March 2007	ITF Rome, Italy	Clay	(Switzerland) Lisa Sabino	3–6, 1–6
Loss	7.	12 September 2007	ITF Lleida, Spain	Clay	(Canada) Heidi El Tabakh	2–6, 3–6
Win	8.	18 May 2008	ITF Badalona, Spain	Clay	(Spain) Maite Gabarrús-Alonso	4–6, 6–1, 6–1
Win	9.	26 October 2008	ITF Sant Cugat del Vallès, Spain	Clay	(Spain) Lara Arruabarrena	6–4, 7–5
Loss	10.	8 March 2009	ITF Giza, Egypt	Clay	(Georgia (country)) Oksana Kalashnikova	4–6, 6–4, 3–6
Win	11.	7 June 2009	ITF Galatina, Italy	Clay	(Georgia (country)) Margalita Chakhnashvili	3–6, 6–3, 6–2
Win	12.	21 June 2009	ITF Padua, Italy	Clay	(Italy) Nathalie Viérin	6–2, 1–6, 7–5
Loss	13.	27 November 2010	ITF Asunción, Paraguay	Clay	(Spain) Inés Ferrer Suárez	2–6, 2–6
Loss	14.	4 February 2013	ITF Antalya, Turkey	Clay	(Romania) Laura Ioana Paar	2–6, 6–4, 2–6
Win	15.	18 March 2013	ITF Antalya, Turkey	Clay	(Romania) Ana Bogdan	6–2, 6–0

=== Doubles: 4 (2–2) ===
Result	No.	Date	Tournament	Surface	Partner	Opponents	Score
Loss	1.	25 September 2010	ITF Bucharest, Romania	Clay	(Spain) Leticia Costas	(Romania) Irina-Camelia Begu (Romania) Elena Bogdan	1–6, 3–6
Win	2.	21 May 2011	ITF Santa Coloma de Farners, Spain	Clay	(Spain) Inés Ferrer Suárez	(Switzerland) Viktorija Golubic (Germany) Nina Zander	6–3, 6–7, [10–4]
Win	3.	28 May 2011	ITF Getxo, Spain	Clay	(Spain) Arabela Fernández Rabener	(Russia) Margarita Lazareva (Spain) Sheila Solsona-Carcasona	7–5, 6–1
Loss	4.	1 February 2013	ITF Antalya, Turkey	Clay	(Bulgaria) Isabella Shinikova	(South Korea) Han Na-lae (South Korea) Lee Jin-a	3–6, 3–6
