= Leticia Costas =

Spanish tennis player (born 1990)

Letícia Costas
- Full name: Letícia Costas Moreira
- Country (sports): Spain
- Residence: Barcelona, Spain
- Born: 22 March 1990 (age 36) Pontevedra, Spain
- Height: 1.65 m (5 ft 5 in)
- Turned pro: 2005
- Retired: 2013
- Plays: Left (two-handed backhand)
- Prize money: $109,129

Singles
- Career record: 187–155
- Career titles: 1 ITF
- Highest ranking: No. 179 (11 July 2011)

Doubles
- Career record: 112–76
- Career titles: 7 ITF
- Highest ranking: No. 170 (23 July 2012)

Leticia Costas Moreira (Spanish pronunciation: [leˈtiθja ˈkostas]; born 22 March 1990) is a former professional Spanish tennis player.

On 11 July 2011, she reached her highest singles ranking by the Women's Tennis Association (WTA) of 179. On 23 July 2012, she peaked at No. 170 of the WTA doubles rankings.

She was coached by Alejo Mancisidor.

In June 2013, Costas announced her retirement from professional tennis.

== ITF Circuit finals ==
Legend
$50,000 tournaments
$25,000 tournaments
$10,000 tournaments

=== Singles: 7 (1 title, 6 runner-ups) ===
Result	W–L	Date	Location	Surface	Opponent	Score
Loss	1.	Aug 2007	Mollerussa, Spain	Hard	(Spain) Sara del Barrio Aragón	0–6, 3–6
Loss	2.	Nov 2008	La Vall d'Uixó, Spain	Clay	(Bosnia and Herzegovina) Ema Burgić	2–6, 1–6
Loss	3.	Dec 2009	Benicarló, Spain	Clay	(Spain) Laura Pous Tió	1–6, 1–6
Win	4.	Jul 2010	La Coruña, Spain	Clay	(Spain) María Teresa Torró Flor	1–6, 6–4, 6–3
Loss	5.	Oct 2010	Madrid, Spain	Clay	(Romania) Elena Bogdan	4–6, 2–6
Loss	6.	Mar 2011	Madrid, Spain	Clay	(Spain) Lara Arruabarrena	4–6, 2–6
Loss	7.	Jun 2011	Montpellier, France	Clay	(Netherlands) Bibiane Schoofs	4–6, 4–6

=== Doubles: 23 (7 titles, 16 runner-ups) ===
Result	W–L	Date	Location	Surface	Partner	Opponents	Score
Win	1.	12 November 2007	Mallorca, Spain	Clay	(Spain) Maite Gabarrús-Alonso	(Russia) Vasilisa Davydova (Russia) Elizaveta Tochilovskaya	7–5, 6–2
Loss	2.	4 February 2008	Mallorca, Spain	Clay	(Spain) Maite Gabarrús-Alonso	(Switzerland) Lisa Sabino (Italy) Valentina Sulpizio	3–6, 6–7
Loss	3.	11 February 2008	Mallorca, Spain	Clay	(Spain) Maite Gabarrús-Alonso	(Slovenia) Polona Hercog (Liechtenstein) Stephanie Vogt	6–7, 3–6
Win	4.	22 September 2008	Granada, Spain	Hard	(Spain) Maite Gabarrús-Alonso	(Russia) Regina Kulikova (France) Irena Pavlovic	walkover
Loss	5.	6 December 2008	Vinaros, Spain	Clay	(Spain) Yera Campos Molina	(Spain) Lucía Sainz (Turkey) Çağla Büyükakçay	4–6, 6–3, [7–10]
Loss	6.	11 February 2009	Mallorca, Spain	Clay	(Spain) Lucía Sainz	(Spain) Rebeca Bou Nogueiro (Morocco) Fatima El Allami	4–6, 1–6
Loss	7.	27 April 2009	Vic, Spain	Clay	(Spain) Lucía Sainz	(Spain) Cristina Sanchez-Quintanar (Spain) Irene Santos-Bravo	5–7, 5–7
Win	8.	25 May 2009	Tortosa, Spain	Clay	(Spain) Yera Campos Molina	(Spain) Sara del Barrio Aragón (Spain) Cristina Sanchez-Quintanar	6–3, 6–1
Loss	9.	November 15, 2009	Mallorca, Spain	Clay	(Spain) Inés Ferrer Suárez	(Switzerland) Romina Oprandi (Spain) Laura Pous Tió	6–7, 2–6
Loss	10.	5 July 2010	Valladolid, Spain	Hard	(Spain) Yera Campos Molina	(United Kingdom) Anna Smith (Austria) Melanie Klaffner	3–6, 6–2, [7–10]
Loss	11.	24 July 2010	La Coruña, Spain	Clay	(Spain) Inés Ferrer Suárez	(Australia) Jade Hopper (France) Victoria Larriere	6–7, 1–6
Loss	12.	25 September 2010	Bucharest, Romania	Clay	(Spain) Eva Fernández Brugués	(Romania) Irina-Camelia Begu (Romania) Elena Bogdan	1–6, 3–6
Win	13.	7 March 2011	Madrid, Spain	Clay	(Italy) Nicole Clerico	(Italy) Evelyn Mayr (Italy) Julia Mayr	6–0, 6–1
Loss	14.	25 June 2011	Périgueux, France	Clay	(Spain) Inés Ferrer Suárez	(Argentina) Florencia Molinero (Japan) Erika Sema	2–6, 6–3, [7–10]
Loss	15.	24 July 2011	La Coruña, Spain	Clay	(Spain) Inés Ferrer Suárez	(Hungary) Tímea Babos (France) Victoria Larrière	5–7, 3–6
Loss	16.	23 September 2011	Foggia, Italy	Clay	(Spain) Inés Ferrer Suárez	(Slovakia) Janette Husárová (Czech Republic) Renata Voráčová	1–6, 2–6
Loss	17.	14 October 2011	Sant Cugat del Valles, Spain	Clay	(Spain) Inés Ferrer Suárez	(Slovakia) Jana Čepelová (Poland) Katarzyna Piter	3–6, 6–2, [6–10]
Loss	18.	23 October 2011	Seville, Spain	Clay	(Spain) Inés Ferrer Suárez	(Spain) Lara Arruabarrena (Spain) Estrella Cabeza Candela	4–6, 4–6
Loss	19.	30 June 2012	Périgueux, France	Clay	(Spain) Inés Ferrer Suárez	(Argentina) Mailen Auroux (Argentina) María Irigoyen	1–6, 2–6
Win	20.	11 October 2012	Sant Cugat del Valles, Spain	Clay	(Spain) Arantxa Parra Santonja	(Spain) Inés Ferrer Suárez (Netherlands) Richèl Hogenkamp	6–3, 6–3
Loss	21.	4 February 2013	Grenoble, France	Hard (i)	(Italy) Nicole Clerico	(Russia) Maria Kondratieva (Czech Republic) Renata Voráčová	1–6, 4–6
Win	22.	18 February 2013	Mallorca, Spain	Clay	(Hungary) Réka Luca Jani	(Italy) Anastasia Grymalska (Russia) Yana Sizikova	6–3, 6–2
Win	23.	25 February 2013	Mallorca, Spain	Clay	(Hungary) Réka Luca Jani	(Spain) Lucía Cervera Vázquez (Spain) Carolina Prats Millán	6–2, 6–1
