= 2008 ITF Women's Circuit (April–June) =

The ITF Women's Circuit is the second-tier tour for women's professional tennis organised by the International Tennis Federation, and is a tier below the WTA Tour. The ITF Women's Circuit includes tournaments with prize money ranging from $10,000 up to $100,000.

This article covers the ITF tour from the month of April until June.

== Schedule ==
=== Key ===
$100,000 tournaments
$75,000 tournaments
$50,000 tournaments
$25,000 tournaments
$10,000 tournaments

=== April ===
Week	Tournament	Winner	Runner-up	Semi finalists	Quarter finalists	Refs
April 7, 2008	Šibenik, Croatia; Indoor Clay $10,000	(Poland) Karolina Kosińska; 7–5, 6–1	(Croatia) Tamara Stojković	(Austria) Patricia Mayr (Hungary) Palma Kiraly	(France) Samantha Schoeffel (Ukraine) Ganna Piven (Serbia) Zorica Petrov (Italy) Nicole Clerico	
April 7, 2008	Šibenik, Croatia; Indoor Clay $10,000	(Poland) Karolina Kosińska (Czech Republic) Darina Šeděnková; 4–6 7–6^{(5)} [10–8]	(Italy) Nicole Clerico (Italy) Giorgia Mortello	(Austria) Patricia Mayr (Hungary) Palma Kiraly	(France) Samantha Schoeffel (Ukraine) Ganna Piven (Serbia) Zorica Petrov (Italy) Nicole Clerico	
April 7, 2008	Belek, Antalya province, Turkey; Clay $10,000	(Netherlands) Michelle Gerards; 7–5 4–6 6–4	(Italy) Valentina Sulpizio	(Turkey) Pemra Özgen (France) Cindy Chala	(Portugal) Magali de Lattre (Russia) Varvara Galanina (Greece) Stamatia Fafaliou (Bulgaria) Elitsa Kostova	
April 7, 2008	Belek, Antalya province, Turkey; Clay $10,000	(Italy) Elisa Balsamo (Italy) Valentina Sulpizio; 6–2 6–2	(Netherlands) Michelle Gerards (Netherlands) Marcella Koek	(Turkey) Pemra Özgen (France) Cindy Chala	(Portugal) Magali de Lattre (Russia) Varvara Galanina (Greece) Stamatia Fafaliou (Bulgaria) Elitsa Kostova	
April 7, 2008	San Severo, Province of Foggia, Italy; Clay $10,000	(Italy) Alexia Virgili; 6–4 0–6 6–4	(Italy) Giulia Remondina	(Italy) Gabriella Polito (Italy) Federica Di Sarra	(Italy) Giulia Gatto-Monticone (Italy) Erika Zanchetta (Italy) Elena Pioppo (Romania) Andreea Văideanu	
April 7, 2008	San Severo, Province of Foggia, Italy; Clay $10,000	(Italy) Benedetta Davato (Italy) Lisa Sabino; 6–3 7–6^{(3)}	(Romania) Laura-Ioana Andrei (Chinese Taipei) Chen Yi	(Italy) Gabriella Polito (Italy) Federica Di Sarra	(Italy) Giulia Gatto-Monticone (Italy) Erika Zanchetta (Italy) Elena Pioppo (Romania) Andreea Văideanu	
April 7, 2008	Telde, Las Palmas, Gran Canaria, Spain; Clay $10,000	(Netherlands) Chayenne Ewijk; 6–2 7–5	(Germany) Dominice Ripoll	(United Kingdom) Yasmin Clarke (Switzerland) Conny Perrin	(Spain) Inés Ferrer Suárez (Russia) Julia Parasyuk (Spain) Carmen Lopez-Rueda (Spain) Rocio de la Torre-Sanchez	
April 7, 2008	Telde, Las Palmas, Gran Canaria, Spain; Clay $10,000	(Netherlands) Chayenne Ewijk (Germany) Dominice Ripoll; 6–2 3–6 [10–4]	(France) Anne-Valerie Evain (Slovenia) Petra Pajalič	(United Kingdom) Yasmin Clarke (Switzerland) Conny Perrin	(Spain) Inés Ferrer Suárez (Russia) Julia Parasyuk (Spain) Carmen Lopez-Rueda (Spain) Rocio de la Torre-Sanchez	
April 7, 2008	Los Mochis, Mexico; Clay $10,000	(United States) Alexis Prousis; 7–6^{(5)} 7–5	(United States) Nataly Yoo	(Czech Republic) Kateřina Kramperová (Croatia) Indire Akiki	(Chile) Andrea Koch Benvenuto (New Zealand) Leanne Baker (Mexico) Valeria Pulido (Mexico) Daniela Múñoz Gallegos	
April 7, 2008	Los Mochis, Mexico; Clay $10,000	(Argentina) Vanesa Furlanetto (Chile) Andrea Koch Benvenuto; 6–0 7–5	(Croatia) Indire Akiki (United States) Allie Will	(Czech Republic) Kateřina Kramperová (Croatia) Indire Akiki	(Chile) Andrea Koch Benvenuto (New Zealand) Leanne Baker (Mexico) Valeria Pulido (Mexico) Daniela Múñoz Gallegos	
April 7, 2008	(United States) Jackson, Mississippi, USA; Clay $25,000	(Argentina) Soledad Esperón; 6–7^{(3)} 6–2 6–1	(Ukraine) Tetiana Luzhanska	(Georgia (country)) Anna Tatishvili (United States) Ahsha Rolle	(United States) Alexandra Mueller (Chinese Taipei) Chin-Wei Chan (India) Sunitha Rao (Czech Republic) Michaela Paštiková	
April 7, 2008	(United States) Jackson, Mississippi, USA; Clay $25,000	(Argentina) Soledad Esperón (Argentina) María Irigoyen; 1–6 6–3 [10–6]	(United States) Christina Fusano (Czech Republic) Michaela Paštiková	(Georgia (country)) Anna Tatishvili (United States) Ahsha Rolle	(United States) Alexandra Mueller (Chinese Taipei) Chin-Wei Chan (India) Sunitha Rao (Czech Republic) Michaela Paštiková	
April 7, 2008	Biarritz, France; Clay $25,000	(Germany) Kathrin Wörle; 6–1 6–3	(Tunisia) Selima Sfar	(France) Stéphanie Cohen-Aloro (Netherlands) Arantxa Rus	(France) Émilie Loit (France) Stéphanie Foretz (France) Virginie Pichet (Germany) Martina Müller	
April 7, 2008	Biarritz, France; Clay $25,000	(Germany) Martina Müller (Australia) Christina Wheeler; 7–6^{(5)} 3–6 [10–8]	(Argentina) Jorgelina Cravero (Argentina) Betina Jozami	(France) Stéphanie Cohen-Aloro (Netherlands) Arantxa Rus	(France) Émilie Loit (France) Stéphanie Foretz (France) Virginie Pichet (Germany) Martina Müller	
April 7, 2008	Monzón, Spain; Hard $75,000	(Czech Republic) Petra Kvitová; 2–6 6–4 7–5	(Belgium) Yanina Wickmayer	(Russia) Vesna Manasieva (France) Séverine Beltrame	(Estonia) Maret Ani (Portugal) Neuza Silva (Switzerland) Emmanuelle Gagliardi (United Kingdom) Naomi Cavaday	
April 7, 2008	Monzón, Spain; Hard $75,000	(Japan) Rika Fujiwara (Switzerland) Emmanuelle Gagliardi; 1–6 7–6^{(5)} [10–8]	(Spain) María José Martínez Sánchez (Spain) Arantxa Parra Santonja	(Russia) Vesna Manasieva (France) Séverine Beltrame	(Estonia) Maret Ani (Portugal) Neuza Silva (Switzerland) Emmanuelle Gagliardi (United Kingdom) Naomi Cavaday	
April 14, 2008	Mazatlán, Mexico; Hard $10,000	(New Zealand) Leanne Baker; 7–6^{(5)} 6–7^{(7)} 6–4	(United States) Anna Lubinsky	(Russia) Natalia Ryzhonkova (United States) Alexis Prousis	(Argentina) Tatiana Búa (United States) Anne Yelsey (Japan) Miki Miyamura (Mexico) Daniela Múñoz Gallegos	
April 14, 2008	Mazatlán, Mexico; Hard $10,000	(Slovakia) Dominika Diešková (Brazil) Ana Clara Duarte; 6–4 6–0	(Argentina) Carla Beltrami (United States) Nataly Yoo	(Russia) Natalia Ryzhonkova (United States) Alexis Prousis	(Argentina) Tatiana Búa (United States) Anne Yelsey (Japan) Miki Miyamura (Mexico) Daniela Múñoz Gallegos	
April 14, 2008	Bol, Croatia; Indoor Clay $10,000	(Czech Republic) Karolína Plíšková; 6–4 7–5	(France) Florence Haring	(Germany) Antonia Matic (France) Charlotte Rodier	(Serbia) Ema Polić (Slovenia) Tina Obrež (Czech Republic) Darina Šeděnková (France) Constance Sibille	
April 14, 2008	Bol, Croatia; Indoor Clay $10,000	(United Kingdom) Naomi Broady (Switzerland) Amra Sadiković; 6–4 6–3	(Slovenia) Tina Obrež (Slovenia) Anja Prislan	(Germany) Antonia Matic (France) Charlotte Rodier	(Serbia) Ema Polić (Slovenia) Tina Obrež (Czech Republic) Darina Šeděnková (France) Constance Sibille	
April 14, 2008	Belek, Antalya province, Turkey; Clay $10,000	(Netherlands) Michelle Gerards; 6–2 2–6 7–6^{(3)}	(Bulgaria) Elitsa Kostova	(Turkey) Çağla Büyükakçay (Italy) Elisa Balsamo	(Italy) Valentina Sulpizio (Turkey) Pemra Özgen (Russia) Varvara Galanina (Russia) Marta Sirotkina	
April 14, 2008	Belek, Antalya province, Turkey; Clay $10,000	(Netherlands) Michelle Gerards (Netherlands) Marcella Koek; 6–3 6–4	(Italy) Elisa Balsamo (Italy) Valentina Sulpizio	(Turkey) Çağla Büyükakçay (Italy) Elisa Balsamo	(Italy) Valentina Sulpizio (Turkey) Pemra Özgen (Russia) Varvara Galanina (Russia) Marta Sirotkina	
April 14, 2008	Villa Allende, Argentina; Clay $10,000	(Argentina) Aranza Salut; 6–2 6–4	(Brazil) Nathalia Rossi	(Peru) Claudia Razzeto (Argentina) Estefania Donnet	(Argentina) Guadalupe Moreno (Paraguay) Isaura Enrique Aguilar (Brazil) Natalia Cheng (Uruguay) Maria-Jose Arechavaleta	
April 14, 2008	Villa Allende, Argentina; Clay $10,000	(Peru) Claudia Razzeto (Argentina) Aranza Salut; 6–4 7–5	(Brazil) Marcela Guimarães Bueno (Argentina) Luciana Sarmenti	(Peru) Claudia Razzeto (Argentina) Estefania Donnet	(Argentina) Guadalupe Moreno (Paraguay) Isaura Enrique Aguilar (Brazil) Natalia Cheng (Uruguay) Maria-Jose Arechavaleta	
April 14, 2008	Fuerteventura, Spain; Carpet $10,000	(Poland) Justyna Jegiołka; 6–3 6–2	(Spain) Irene Rehberger Bescos	(Italy) Alice Moroni (Italy) Giulia Gatto-Monticone	(Italy) Valentine Confalonieri (Slovenia) Petra Pajalič (United Kingdom) Yasmin Clarke (United Kingdom) Jade Windley	
April 14, 2008	Fuerteventura, Spain; Carpet $10,000	(United Kingdom) Jade Curtis (Spain) Irene Rehberger Bescos; 6–3 7–6^{(6)}	(Italy) Benedetta Davato (Italy) Giulia Gatto-Monticone	(Italy) Alice Moroni (Italy) Giulia Gatto-Monticone	(Italy) Valentine Confalonieri (Slovenia) Petra Pajalič (United Kingdom) Yasmin Clarke (United Kingdom) Jade Windley	
April 14, 2008	(United States) Palm Beach Gardens, Florida, USA; Clay $25,000	(Argentina) Soledad Esperón; 6–4 6–1	(Bulgaria) Sesil Karatantcheva	(Germany) Sabine Klaschka (India) Sunitha Rao	(Georgia (country)) Anna Tatishvili (Venezuela) Gabriela Paz Franco (Indonesia) Romana Tedjakusuma (United States) Kimberly Couts	
April 14, 2008	(United States) Palm Beach Gardens, Florida, USA; Clay $25,000	(Brazil) Maria Fernanda Alves (Czech Republic) Michaela Paštiková; 3–6 6–3 [10–5]	(Russia) Ekaterina Afinogenova (United States) Lauren Albanese	(Germany) Sabine Klaschka (India) Sunitha Rao	(Georgia (country)) Anna Tatishvili (Venezuela) Gabriela Paz Franco (Indonesia) Romana Tedjakusuma (United States) Kimberly Couts	
April 14, 2008	Bari, Italy; Clay $25,000	(Netherlands) Arantxa Rus; 2–6 7–5 6–3	(Italy) Alberta Brianti	(Czech Republic) Lucie Hradecká (Italy) Anna Floris	(Bosnia and Herzegovina) Sandra Martinović (Czech Republic) Sandra Záhlavová (Italy) Giulia Gabba (Hungary) Kira Nagy	
April 14, 2008	Bari, Italy; Clay $25,000	(Italy) Alberta Brianti (Italy) Anna Floris; 6–3 6–3	(Slovenia) Polona Hercog (Liechtenstein) Stephanie Vogt	(Czech Republic) Lucie Hradecká (Italy) Anna Floris	(Bosnia and Herzegovina) Sandra Martinović (Czech Republic) Sandra Záhlavová (Italy) Giulia Gabba (Hungary) Kira Nagy	
April 14, 2008	Saint-Malo, France; Clay $100,000+H	(France) Stéphanie Cohen-Aloro; 6–2 7–5	(Croatia) Jelena Kostanić Tosic	(Czech Republic) Renata Voráčová (France) Séverine Beltrame	(Italy) Roberta Vinci (United Kingdom) Katie O'Brien (France) Stéphanie Foretz (France) Pauline Parmentier	
April 14, 2008	Saint-Malo, France; Clay $100,000+H	(Spain) María José Martínez Sánchez (Spain) Arantxa Parra Santonja; 6–2 6–1	(Czech Republic) Renata Voráčová (Belarus) Anastasiya Yakimova	(Czech Republic) Renata Voráčová (France) Séverine Beltrame	(Italy) Roberta Vinci (United Kingdom) Katie O'Brien (France) Stéphanie Foretz (France) Pauline Parmentier	
April 21, 2008	Toluca, Mexico; Hard $10,000	(Portugal) Frederica Piedade; 6–3 6–3	(Netherlands) Bo Verhulsdonk	(Colombia) Catalina Robles (New Zealand) Sacha Jones	(United Kingdom) Anna Fitzpatrick (Switzerland) Stefania Boffa (Argentina) Carla Beltrami (Croatia) Indire Akiki	
April 21, 2008	Toluca, Mexico; Hard $10,000	(Argentina) Agustina Lepore (Portugal) Frederica Piedade; 6–4 6–2	(United States) Lena Litvak (Canada) Rebecca Marino	(Colombia) Catalina Robles (New Zealand) Sacha Jones	(United Kingdom) Anna Fitzpatrick (Switzerland) Stefania Boffa (Argentina) Carla Beltrami (Croatia) Indire Akiki	
April 21, 2008	Hvar, Croatia; Indoor Clay $10,000	(Austria) Patricia Mayr; 6–4 6–2	(Slovakia) Lenka Juríková	(Slovakia) Monika Kochanová (Serbia) Ema Polić	(Serbia) Jovana Miletic (France) Florence Haring (Serbia) Ljubica Avramović (France) Nadege Vergos	
April 21, 2008	Hvar, Croatia; Indoor Clay $10,000	(Austria) Patricia Mayr (Italy) Vivienne Vierin; 6–4 7–6^{(2)}	(Slovakia) Lenka Juríková (Slovakia) Monika Kochanová	(Slovakia) Monika Kochanová (Serbia) Ema Polić	(Serbia) Jovana Miletic (France) Florence Haring (Serbia) Ljubica Avramović (France) Nadege Vergos	
April 21, 2008	Torrent, Valencia, Spain; Clay $10,000	(Spain) Matilde Muñoz Gonzalves; 6–3 6–2	(Spain) Maite Gabarrús-Alonso	(France) Stephanie Vongsouthi (Spain) Rebeca Bou Nogueiro	(France) Karla Mraz (Spain) Sandra Soler-Sola (Spain) Leticia Costas (France) Anne-Valerie Evain	
April 21, 2008	Torrent, Valencia, Spain; Clay $10,000	(Italy) Elena Pioppo (Italy) Verdiana Verardi; 7–5 4–6 [10–5]	(Russia) Julia Parasyuk (Germany) Dominice Ripoll	(France) Stephanie Vongsouthi (Spain) Rebeca Bou Nogueiro	(France) Karla Mraz (Spain) Sandra Soler-Sola (Spain) Leticia Costas (France) Anne-Valerie Evain	
April 21, 2008	Naples, Italy; Clay $10,000	(Australia) Christina Wheeler; 6–4 7–6^{(4)}	(Italy) Lisa Sabino	(Italy) Federica Quercia (Netherlands) Michelle Gerards	(Slovakia) Martina Balogová (Luxembourg) Mandy Minella (Italy) Martina Caregaro (Italy) Alexia Virgili	
April 21, 2008	Naples, Italy; Clay $10,000	(Austria) Stefanie Haidner (Italy) Sara Savarise; 6–3 6–2	(Italy) Valeria Casillo (Russia) Ekaterina Strogonova	(Italy) Federica Quercia (Netherlands) Michelle Gerards	(Slovakia) Martina Balogová (Luxembourg) Mandy Minella (Italy) Martina Caregaro (Italy) Alexia Virgili	
April 21, 2008	(South Korea) Incheon, Korea Republic; Hard $25,000	(Chinese Taipei) Su-Wei Hsieh; 6–1 6–1	(China) Xie Yanze	(South Korea) Jin-A Lee (South Korea) Ye-Ra Lee	(New Zealand) Ellen Barry (Russia) Alexandra Panova (Chinese Taipei) Chan Chin-wei (South Africa) Surina De Beer	
April 21, 2008	(South Korea) Incheon, Korea Republic; Hard $25,000	(Chinese Taipei) Chan Chin-wei (Slovakia) Jarmila Gajdošová; 1–6 6–1 [10–5]	(South Korea) Chang Kyung-mi (South Korea) Lee Jin-a	(South Korea) Jin-A Lee (South Korea) Ye-Ra Lee	(New Zealand) Ellen Barry (Russia) Alexandra Panova (Chinese Taipei) Chan Chin-wei (South Africa) Surina De Beer	
April 21, 2008	Namangan, Uzbekistan; Hard $25,000	(Kyrgyzstan) Ksenia Palkina; 6–0 3–6 6–3	(Russia) Maria Kondratieva	(Russia) Marina Shamayko (Netherlands) Chayenne Ewijk	(Russia) Ekaterina Dranets (Russia) Maya Gaverova (Georgia (country)) Sophia Shapatava (Uzbekistan) Aleksandra Kolesnichenko	
April 21, 2008	Namangan, Uzbekistan; Hard $25,000	(Russia) Vasilisa Davydova (Russia) Maria Zharkova; 3–6 7–5 [10–6]	(Netherlands) Chayenne Ewijk (Russia) Marina Melnikova	(Russia) Marina Shamayko (Netherlands) Chayenne Ewijk	(Russia) Ekaterina Dranets (Russia) Maya Gaverova (Georgia (country)) Sophia Shapatava (Uzbekistan) Aleksandra Kolesnichenko	
April 21, 2008	(United States) Dothan, Alabama, USA; Clay $75,000	(United States) Bethanie Mattek; 6–2 7–6^{(3)}	(United States) Varvara Lepchenko	(Australia) Samantha Stosur (United States) Jamea Jackson	(United States) Julie Ditty (South Africa) Chanelle Scheepers (Ukraine) Tetiana Luzhanska (United States) Alexa Glatch	
April 21, 2008	(United States) Dothan, Alabama, USA; Clay $75,000	(Ukraine) Tetiana Luzhanska (Czech Republic) Michaela Paštiková; 6–1 6–3	(Brazil) Maria Fernanda Alves (Canada) StéphanieDubois	(Australia) Samantha Stosur (United States) Jamea Jackson	(United States) Julie Ditty (South Africa) Chanelle Scheepers (Ukraine) Tetiana Luzhanska (United States) Alexa Glatch	
April 28, 2008	Adana, Turkey; Clay $10,000	(Ukraine) Lesia Tsurenko; 4–6 6–1 6–1	(Brazil) Vivian Segnini	(Russia) Irina Kotkina (Turkey) Çağla Büyükakçay	(Russia) Eugeniya Pashkova (Russia) Inna Sokolova (Georgia (country)) Sofia Kvatsabaia (Turkey) Pemra Özgen	
April 28, 2008	Adana, Turkey; Clay $10,000	(Bulgaria) Huliya Velieva (Bulgaria) Lyutfya Velieva; 5–7 6–1 [10–4]	(Russia) Julia Efremova (Russia) Diana Isaeva	(Russia) Irina Kotkina (Turkey) Çağla Büyükakçay	(Russia) Eugeniya Pashkova (Russia) Inna Sokolova (Georgia (country)) Sofia Kvatsabaia (Turkey) Pemra Özgen	
April 28, 2008	Bell Ville, Argentina; Clay $10,000	(Hungary) Katalin Marosi; 6–2 6–2	(Argentina) Aranza Salut	(Argentina) Carla Beltrami (Argentina) Tatiana Búa	(Spain) Nuria Párrizas Díaz (Argentina) Estefania Donnet (Bulgaria) Aleksandrina Naydenova (Peru) Claudia Razzeto	
April 28, 2008	Bell Ville, Argentina; Clay $10,000	(Argentina) Tatiana Búa (Colombia) Karen Emilia Castiblanco Duarte; 6–4 1–6 [10–7]	(Brazil) Joana Cortez (Brazil) Natalia Guitler	(Argentina) Carla Beltrami (Argentina) Tatiana Búa	(Spain) Nuria Párrizas Díaz (Argentina) Estefania Donnet (Bulgaria) Aleksandrina Naydenova (Peru) Claudia Razzeto	
April 28, 2008	(United Kingdom) Bournemouth, Great Britain; Clay $10,000	(Netherlands) Leonie Mekel; 5–7 6–2 6–3	(France) Camille Sapene	(Netherlands) Bibiane Schoofs (United Kingdom) Yasmin Clarke	(Spain) Sandra Soler Sola (Italy) Alice Balducci (United Kingdom) Amanda Cunningham (Belgium) Sophie Cornerotte	
April 28, 2008	(United Kingdom) Bournemouth, Great Britain; Clay $10,000	(United Kingdom) Yasmin Clarke (United Kingdom) Elizabeth Thomas; 6–2 4–6 [12–10]	(Portugal) Catarina Ferreira (United Kingdom) Amy Sargeant	(Netherlands) Bibiane Schoofs (United Kingdom) Yasmin Clarke	(Spain) Sandra Soler Sola (Italy) Alice Balducci (United Kingdom) Amanda Cunningham (Belgium) Sophie Cornerotte	
April 28, 2008	Brescia, Italy; Clay $10,000	(Italy) Lisa Sabino; 6–3 6–3	(Austria) Patricia Mayr	(Italy) Anna-Giulia Remondina (Italy) Evelyn Mayr	(Brazil) Roxane Vaisemberg (Italy) Elena Pioppo (Italy) Julia Mayr (Italy) Agnes Zucchini	
April 28, 2008	Brescia, Italy; Clay $10,000	(Italy) Elena Pioppo (Italy) Lisa Sabino; 3–3 ret.	(Italy) Elisa Belleri (Italy) Agnes Zucchini	(Italy) Anna-Giulia Remondina (Italy) Evelyn Mayr	(Brazil) Roxane Vaisemberg (Italy) Elena Pioppo (Italy) Julia Mayr (Italy) Agnes Zucchini	
April 28, 2008	Bucharest, Romania; Clay $10,000	(Romania) Simona Halep; 6–1 6–3	(Romania) Elena Bogdan	(Romania) Cristina Mitu (Romania) Ioana Ivan	(Poland) Joanna Sakowicz (Romania) Laura-Ioana Andrei (France) Kinnie Laisné (Romania) Diana Gae	
April 28, 2008	Bucharest, Romania; Clay $10,000	(Romania) Simona Halep (Romania) Ionela-Andreea Iova; 6–3 6–1	(Ukraine) Oksana Khomyk (New Zealand) Shona Lee	(Romania) Cristina Mitu (Romania) Ioana Ivan	(Poland) Joanna Sakowicz (Romania) Laura-Ioana Andrei (France) Kinnie Laisné (Romania) Diana Gae	
April 28, 2008	Cochin, India; Clay $10,000	(India) Rushmi Chakravarthi; 6–4 7–5	(Georgia (country)) Magda Okruashvili	(Japan) Miki Miyamura (India) Shalini Sahoo	(India) Parul Goswami (South Korea) Yu Min-hwa (United States) Kelsey Sundaram (India) Kumari Sweta Solanki	
April 28, 2008	Cochin, India; Clay $10,000	(India) Rushmi Chakravarthi (India) Poojashree Venkatesha; 6–1 7–5	(India) Geeta Monohar (India) Archana Venkataraman	(Japan) Miki Miyamura (India) Shalini Sahoo	(India) Parul Goswami (South Korea) Yu Min-hwa (United States) Kelsey Sundaram (India) Kumari Sweta Solanki	
April 28, 2008	Balikpapan, Indonesia; Hard $25,000	(Thailand) Noppawan Lertcheewakarn; 6–3 6–2	(India) Isha Lakhani	(Indonesia) Sandy Gumulya (Russia) Elena Chernyakova	(China) Liang Chen (China) Hao Jie (Indonesia) Jessy Rompies (Indonesia) Ayu Fani Damayanti	
April 28, 2008	Balikpapan, Indonesia; Hard $25,000	(Indonesia) Sandy Gumulya (Indonesia) Lavinia Tananta; 6–3 4–6 [10–7]	(Japan) Ayumi Oka (Japan) Tomoko Sugano	(Indonesia) Sandy Gumulya (Russia) Elena Chernyakova	(China) Liang Chen (China) Hao Jie (Indonesia) Jessy Rompies (Indonesia) Ayu Fani Damayanti	
April 28, 2008	Coatzacoalcos, Mexico; Hard $25,000	(Argentina) Agustina Lepore; 6–4 6–4	(Argentina) Soledad Esperón	(Mexico) Valeria Pulido (United States) Alexis Prousis	(Portugal) Frederica Piedade (Argentina) María Irigoyen (Netherlands) Bo Verhulsdonk (United States) Lena Litvak	
April 28, 2008	Coatzacoalcos, Mexico; Hard $25,000	(United Kingdom) Anna Fitzpatrick (United Kingdom) Anna Hawkins; 6–2 6–2	(Argentina) María Irigoyen (Argentina) Agustina Lepore	(Mexico) Valeria Pulido (United States) Alexis Prousis	(Portugal) Frederica Piedade (Argentina) María Irigoyen (Netherlands) Bo Verhulsdonk (United States) Lena Litvak	
April 28, 2008	Gimcheon, South Korea; Hard $25,000	(Slovakia) Jarmila Gajdošová; 6–3 6–2	(China) Lu Jing-jing	(Hong Kong) Zhang Ling (South Korea) Lee Ye-ra	(China) Zhang Shuai (Thailand) Nudnida Luangnam (United Kingdom) Georgie Stoop (South Korea) Lee Jin-a	
April 28, 2008	Gimcheon, South Korea; Hard $25,000	(Chinese Taipei) Chan Chin-wei (Slovakia) Jarmila Gajdošová; 6–2 6–0	(South Korea) Cho Yoon-jeong (South Korea) Kim Jin-hee	(Hong Kong) Zhang Ling (South Korea) Lee Ye-ra	(China) Zhang Shuai (Thailand) Nudnida Luangnam (United Kingdom) Georgie Stoop (South Korea) Lee Jin-a	
April 28, 2008	Charlottesville, Virginia, United States; Clay $50,000	(United States) Alexis Gordon; 6–3 6–3	(Russia) Olga Puchkova	(Belgium) Yanina Wickmayer (United States) Bethanie Mattek	(United States) Alexandra Podkolzina (Australia) Samantha Stosur (United States) Kimberly Couts (Georgia (country)) Anna Tatishvili	
April 28, 2008	Charlottesville, Virginia, United States; Clay $50,000	(United States) Raquel Kops-Jones (United States) Abigail Spears; 6–1 6–3	(United States) Kimberly Couts (Georgia (country)) Anna Tatishvili	(Belgium) Yanina Wickmayer (United States) Bethanie Mattek	(United States) Alexandra Podkolzina (Australia) Samantha Stosur (United States) Kimberly Couts (Georgia (country)) Anna Tatishvili	
April 28, 2008	Kangaroo Cup; Gifu, Japan; Carpet $50,000; Singles – Doubles	(Thailand) Tamarine Tanasugarn; 4–6 7–5 6–2	(Japan) Kimiko Date-Krumm	(United Kingdom) Melanie South (Croatia) Ana Savić	(Japan) Aiko Nakamura (New Zealand) Ellen Barry (Japan) Tomoko Yonemura (Japan) Akiko Yonemura	
April 28, 2008	Kangaroo Cup; Gifu, Japan; Carpet $50,000; Singles – Doubles	(Japan) Kimiko Date-Krumm (Japan) Kurumi Nara; 6–1 6–7^{(8)} [10–7]	(United Kingdom) Melanie South (Netherlands) Nicole Thyssen	(United Kingdom) Melanie South (Croatia) Ana Savić	(Japan) Aiko Nakamura (New Zealand) Ellen Barry (Japan) Tomoko Yonemura (Japan) Akiko Yonemura	
April 28, 2008	Makarska, Croatia; Clay $50,000+H	(Liechtenstein) Stephanie Vogt; 6–2 6–3	(Russia) Anastasia Pivovarova	(Romania) Liana Ungur (Slovenia) Polona Hercog	(Croatia) Sandra Mamić (Slovakia) Zuzana Kučová (France) Florence Haring (Czech Republic) Zuzana Ondrášková	
April 28, 2008	Makarska, Croatia; Clay $50,000+H	(Slovenia) Polona Hercog (Liechtenstein) Stephanie Vogt; 7–5 6–2	(Slovenia) Tadeja Majerič (Slovenia) Maša Zec Peškirič	(Romania) Liana Ungur (Slovenia) Polona Hercog	(Croatia) Sandra Mamić (Slovakia) Zuzana Kučová (France) Florence Haring (Czech Republic) Zuzana Ondrášková	
April 28, 2008	Cagnes-sur-Mer, France; Clay $100,000+H	(Ukraine) Viktoriya Kutuzova; 6–1 7–5	(Estonia) Maret Ani	(Romania) Monica Niculescu (Germany) Julia Görges	(Italy) Astrid Besser (Russia) Ekaterina Bychkova (France) Stéphanie Foretz (Czech Republic) Renata Voráčová	
April 28, 2008	Cagnes-sur-Mer, France; Clay $100,000+H	(Romania) Monica Niculescu (Czech Republic) Renata Voráčová; 6–7^{(2)} 6–1 [10–5]	(France) Julie Coin (Canada) Marie-Ève Pelletier	(Romania) Monica Niculescu (Germany) Julia Görges	(Italy) Astrid Besser (Russia) Ekaterina Bychkova (France) Stéphanie Foretz (Czech Republic) Renata Voráčová	

=== May ===
Week	Tournament	Winner	Runner-up	Semi finalists	Quarter finalists	Refs
May 5, 2008	Buenos Aires, Argentina; Clay $10,000	(Bolivia) María Fernanda Álvarez Terán; 7–6^{(4)} 0–6 6–0	(Argentina) Andrea Benítez	(Argentina) Tatiana Búa (Brazil) Natalia Guitler	(Peru) Claudia Razzeto (Brazil) Joana Cortez (Brazil) Nathalia Rossi (Spain) Carmen Lopez Rueda	
May 5, 2008	Buenos Aires, Argentina; Clay $10,000	(Argentina) Carla Beltrami (Argentina) Guillermina Zukerman; 7–5 6–2	(Bulgaria) Aleksandrina Naydenova (Brazil) Nathalia Rossi	(Argentina) Tatiana Búa (Brazil) Natalia Guitler	(Peru) Claudia Razzeto (Brazil) Joana Cortez (Brazil) Nathalia Rossi (Spain) Carmen Lopez Rueda	
May 5, 2008	(United Kingdom) Edinburgh, Great Britain; Clay $10,000	(Netherlands) Marcella Koek; 6–1 4–6 6–3	(Netherlands) Bibiane Schoofs	(Italy) Federica Di Sarra (Bulgaria) Biljana Pawlowa-Dimitrova	(Belarus) Volha Duko (United Kingdom) Stephanie Cornish (United Kingdom) Jade Windley (United Kingdom) Yasmin Clarke	
May 5, 2008	(United Kingdom) Edinburgh, Great Britain; Clay $10,000	(United Kingdom) Jade Curtis (United Kingdom) Elizabeth Thomas; 6–1 7–6^{(5)}	(Bulgaria) Biljana Pawlowa-Dimitrova (Belgium) Soetkin Van Deun	(Italy) Federica Di Sarra (Bulgaria) Biljana Pawlowa-Dimitrova	(Belarus) Volha Duko (United Kingdom) Stephanie Cornish (United Kingdom) Jade Windley (United Kingdom) Yasmin Clarke	
May 5, 2008	(Slovakia) Michalovce, Slovak Republic; Clay $10,000	(Slovakia) Klaudia Boczová; 6–2 6–3	(Slovakia) Romana Tabak	(Poland) Katarzyna Piter (Hungary) Palma Kiraly	(Slovakia) Lenka Juríková (Czech Republic) Kateřina Kramperová (Czech Republic) Eva Husaková (Czech Republic) Pavla Smidová	
May 5, 2008	(Slovakia) Michalovce, Slovak Republic; Clay $10,000	(Slovakia) Lenka Juríková (Poland) Katarzyna Piter; 6–1 6–1	(Slovakia) Romana Tabak (Slovakia) Nikola Vajdová	(Poland) Katarzyna Piter (Hungary) Palma Kiraly	(Slovakia) Lenka Juríková (Czech Republic) Kateřina Kramperová (Czech Republic) Eva Husaková (Czech Republic) Pavla Smidová	
May 5, 2008	Mostar, Bosnia and Herzegovina; Clay $10,000	(Australia) Johanna Konta; 6–2 6–3	(Austria) Janina Toljan	(Croatia) Silvia Njirić (Croatia) Tereza Mrdeža	(Czech Republic) Teresa Malíková (Bosnia and Herzegovina) Ema Burgić (Slovenia) Anja Prislan (Slovenia) Mika Urbančič	
May 5, 2008	Mostar, Bosnia and Herzegovina; Clay $10,000	(Sweden) Ajla Behram (Sweden) Diana Eriksson; 7–6^{(4)} 7–6^{(5)}	(Serbia) Jovana Miletić (Serbia) Zorica Petrov	(Croatia) Silvia Njirić (Croatia) Tereza Mrdeža	(Czech Republic) Teresa Malíková (Bosnia and Herzegovina) Ema Burgić (Slovenia) Anja Prislan (Slovenia) Mika Urbančič	
May 5, 2008	Tarakan, Indonesia; Hard $10,000	(China) Liang Chen; 6–7^{(1)} 6–2 6–3	(Indonesia) Lavinia Tananta	(China) Hao Jie (Japan) Mitsuko Ise	(Vietnam) Viet Ha Ngo (Indonesia) Beatrice Gumulya (Japan) Ayumi Oka (Indonesia) Jessy Rompies	
May 5, 2008	Tarakan, Indonesia; Hard $10,000	(Indonesia) Liza Andriyani (Indonesia) Ayu Fani Damayanti; 6–2 6–3	(Australia) Tiffany Welford (Hong Kong) Yang Zi-Jun	(China) Hao Jie (Japan) Mitsuko Ise	(Vietnam) Viet Ha Ngo (Indonesia) Beatrice Gumulya (Japan) Ayumi Oka (Indonesia) Jessy Rompies	
May 5, 2008	Trivandrum, India; Clay $10,000	(India) Isha Lakhani; 6–7^{(2)} 6–2 6–4	(Japan) Miki Miyamura	(India) Sanaa Bhambri (South Korea) Yu Min Hwa	(India) Prerana Mythri Appineni (India) Geeta Manohar (India) Poojashree Venkatesha (India) Rushmi Chakravarthi	
May 5, 2008	Trivandrum, India; Clay $10,000	(Japan) Miki Miyamura (South Korea) Yu Min Hwa; 7–6^{(6)} 6–2	(Georgia (country)) Magda Okruashvili (India) Poojashree Venkatesha	(India) Sanaa Bhambri (South Korea) Yu Min Hwa	(India) Prerana Mythri Appineni (India) Geeta Manohar (India) Poojashree Venkatesha (India) Rushmi Chakravarthi	
May 5, 2008	Vic, Spain; Clay $10,000	(Italy) Lisa Sabino w/o	(Belarus) Anna Orlik	(Italy) Giulia Gatto-Monticone (Italy) Federica Quercia	(Spain) Leticia Costas Moreira (Spain) Maite Gabarrús-Alonso (Spain) Ana Miguel Ivern (Spain) Yera Campos Molina	
May 5, 2008	Vic, Spain; Clay $10,000	(Italy) Benedetta Davato (Italy) Lisa Sabino; 6–2 6–2	(Morocco) Fatima El Allami (Armenia) Anna Movsisyan	(Italy) Giulia Gatto-Monticone (Italy) Federica Quercia	(Spain) Leticia Costas Moreira (Spain) Maite Gabarrús-Alonso (Spain) Ana Miguel Ivern (Spain) Yera Campos Molina	
May 5, 2008	Antalya, Turkey; Clay $25,000	(Belarus) Ksenia Milevskaya; 6–2 6–2	(Netherlands) Michelle Gerards	(Slovenia) Maša Zec Peškirič (Ukraine) Khrystyna Antoniichuk	(Poland) Magdalena Kiszczyńska (Georgia (country)) Tinatin Kavlashvili (Germany) Sarah Groenert (Turkey) Çağla Büyükakçay	
May 5, 2008	Antalya, Turkey; Clay $25,000	(Austria) Melanie Klaffner (Belarus) Ksenia Milevskaya; 6–2 7–5	(Georgia (country)) Oksana Kalashnikova (Turkey) Pemra Özgen	(Slovenia) Maša Zec Peškirič (Ukraine) Khrystyna Antoniichuk	(Poland) Magdalena Kiszczyńska (Georgia (country)) Tinatin Kavlashvili (Germany) Sarah Groenert (Turkey) Çağla Büyükakçay	
May 5, 2008	Changwon, South Korea; Clay $25,000	(China) Xie Yanze; 6–4 6–4	(Russia) Alexandra Panova	(South Korea) Lee Jin-A (China) Lu Jing Jing	(Hong Kong) Zhang Ling (Japan) Chiaki Okadaue (Thailand) Montinee Tangphong (South Korea) Lee Ye-ra	
May 5, 2008	Changwon, South Korea; Clay $25,000	(South Korea) Chang Kyung-mi (South Korea) Lee Jin-a; 7–5 6–2	(South Korea) Cho Yoon-jeong (South Korea) Kim Jin-hee	(South Korea) Lee Jin-A (China) Lu Jing Jing	(Hong Kong) Zhang Ling (Japan) Chiaki Okadaue (Thailand) Montinee Tangphong (South Korea) Lee Ye-ra	
May 5, 2008	Florence, Italy; Clay $25,000	(Australia) Jelena Dokić; 6–1 6–3	(Czech Republic) Lucie Hradecká	(Germany) Anne Schäfer (Brazil) Roxane Vaisemberg	(Sweden) Johanna Larsson (Croatia) Mirjana Lučić (Hungary) Kira Nagy (Brazil) Teliana Pereira	
May 5, 2008	Florence, Italy; Clay $25,000	(Hungary) Kira Nagy (Italy) Valentina Sassi; 6–2 6–3	(Italy) Martina Caciotte (Kyrgyzstan) Ksenia Palkina	(Germany) Anne Schäfer (Brazil) Roxane Vaisemberg	(Sweden) Johanna Larsson (Croatia) Mirjana Lučić (Hungary) Kira Nagy (Brazil) Teliana Pereira	
May 5, 2008	Irapuato, Mexico; Hard $25,000	(Colombia) Mariana Duque Mariño; 6–4 3–6 6–3	(Czech Republic) Nikola Fraňková	(Mexico) Melissa Torres Sandoval (United Kingdom) Sarah Borwell	(Spain) Irene Rehberger Bescos (United Kingdom) Anna Fitzpatrick (United States) Lauren Albanese (Portugal) Frederica Piedade	
May 5, 2008	Irapuato, Mexico; Hard $25,000	(United Kingdom) Sarah Borwell (United States) Robin Stephenson; 6–4 3–6 [10–4]	(Switzerland) Stefania Boffa (Czech Republic) Nikola Fraňková	(Mexico) Melissa Torres Sandoval (United Kingdom) Sarah Borwell	(Spain) Irene Rehberger Bescos (United Kingdom) Anna Fitzpatrick (United States) Lauren Albanese (Portugal) Frederica Piedade	
May 5, 2008	Bucharest, Romania; Clay $50,000	(Czech Republic) Petra Cetkovská; 7–6^{(5)} 7–6^{(3)}	(Romania) Sorana Cîrstea	(Italy) Alberta Brianti (Russia) Anastasia Pivovarova	(Australia) Christina Wheeler (Spain) Sílvia Soler Espinosa (Liechtenstein) Stephanie Vogt (Romania) Simona Halep	
May 5, 2008	Bucharest, Romania; Clay $50,000	(Czech Republic) Petra Cetkovská (Czech Republic) Hana Šromová; 6–4 7–5	(Romania) Sorona Cîrstea (Romania) Ágnes Szatmári	(Italy) Alberta Brianti (Russia) Anastasia Pivovarova	(Australia) Christina Wheeler (Spain) Sílvia Soler Espinosa (Liechtenstein) Stephanie Vogt (Romania) Simona Halep	
May 5, 2008	Fukuoka, Japan; Carpet $50,000	(Japan) Tomoko Yonemura; 6–1 2–6 7–6^{(6)}	(Thailand) Tamarine Tanasugarn	(Japan) Aiko Nakamura (United Kingdom) Melanie South	(Japan) Kimiko Date-Krumm (Japan) Kumiko Iijima (Japan) Akiko Yonemura (Japan) Junri Namigata	
May 5, 2008	Fukuoka, Japan; Carpet $50,000	(United Kingdom) Melanie South (Netherlands) Nicole Thyssen; 4–6 6–3 [14–12]	(Japan) Maya Kato (Australia) Julia Moriarty	(Japan) Aiko Nakamura (United Kingdom) Melanie South	(Japan) Kimiko Date-Krumm (Japan) Kumiko Iijima (Japan) Akiko Yonemura (Japan) Junri Namigata	
May 5, 2008	Indian Harbour Beach, Florida, United States; Clay $50,000	(Belgium) Yanina Wickmayer; 6–4 7–6^{(5)}	(United States) Bethanie Mattek	(Indonesia) Romana Tedjakusuma (Georgia (country)) Anna Tatishvili	(United States) Melanie Oudin (Slovenia) Petra Rampre (United States) Christina McHale (United States) Raquel Kops-Jones	
May 5, 2008	Indian Harbour Beach, Florida, United States; Clay $50,000	(United States) Madison Brengle (United States) Kristy Frilling; 2–6 6–4 [10–7]	(United States) Raquel Kops-Jones (United States) Abigail Spears	(Indonesia) Romana Tedjakusuma (Georgia (country)) Anna Tatishvili	(United States) Melanie Oudin (Slovenia) Petra Rampre (United States) Christina McHale (United States) Raquel Kops-Jones	
May 5, 2008	Jounieh, Lebanon; Clay $50,000+H	(United Kingdom) Anne Keothavong; 6–4 6–1	(Spain) Lourdes Domínguez Lino	(Ukraine) Veronika Kapshay (Spain) Marta Marrero	(Russia) Nina Bratchikova (Switzerland) Stefanie Vögele (Croatia) Maria Abramović (Slovakia) Kristína Kučová	
May 5, 2008	Jounieh, Lebanon; Clay $50,000+H	(Russia) Nina Bratchikova (Ukraine) Veronika Kapshay; 7–5 3–6 [10–6]	(Slovakia) Kristína Kučová (Switzerland) Stefanie Vögele	(Ukraine) Veronika Kapshay (Spain) Marta Marrero	(Russia) Nina Bratchikova (Switzerland) Stefanie Vögele (Croatia) Maria Abramović (Slovakia) Kristína Kučová	
May 5, 2008	Zagreb, Croatia; Clay $75,000	(Sweden) Sofia Arvidsson; 7–6^{(0)} 6–2	(France) Séverine Brémond	(France) Mathilde Johansson (Italy) Roberta Vinci	(Croatia) Jelena Kostanić Tošić (Russia) Evgeniya Rodina (Croatia) Karolina Šprem (Germany) Kathrin Wörle	
May 5, 2008	Zagreb, Croatia; Clay $75,000	(Hungary) Melinda Czink (India) Sunitha Rao; 6–4 6–2	(France) Stéphanie Foretz (Croatia) Jelena Kostanić Tošić	(France) Mathilde Johansson (Italy) Roberta Vinci	(Croatia) Jelena Kostanić Tošić (Russia) Evgeniya Rodina (Croatia) Karolina Šprem (Germany) Kathrin Wörle	
May 12, 2008	Badalona, Spain; Clay $10,000	(Spain) Eva Fernández Brugués; 4–6 6–1 6–1	(Spain) Maite Gabarrús-Alonso	(India) Sandhya Nagaraj (Italy) Federica Quercia	(Russia) Julia Parasyuk (Belgium) Soetkin Van Deun (France) Chloé Babet (Spain) Matilde Muñoz Gonzalves	
May 12, 2008	Badalona, Spain; Clay $10,000	(Italy) Benedetta Davato (Italy) Lisa Sabino; 2–6 6–2 [10–8]	(United Kingdom) Amanda Carreras (Spain) Maite Gabarrús-Alonso	(India) Sandhya Nagaraj (Italy) Federica Quercia	(Russia) Julia Parasyuk (Belgium) Soetkin Van Deun (France) Chloé Babet (Spain) Matilde Muñoz Gonzalves	
May 12, 2008	Bangkok, Thailand; Hard $10,000	(South Korea) Kim Sun-Jung; 7–5 7–6^{(5)}	(Uzbekistan) Albina Khabibulina	(South Korea) Lee Cho-Won (South Korea) Hong Da-Jung	(Thailand) Sophia Mulsap (Australia) Monika Wejnert (India) Sanaa Bhambri (South Korea) Han Sung-Hee	
May 12, 2008	Bangkok, Thailand; Hard $10,000	(Thailand) Napaporn Tongsalee (Thailand) Suchanun Viratprasert; 1–6 7–6^{(3)} [10–8]	(Uzbekistan) Albina Khabibulina (Uzbekistan) Dilyara Saidkhodjayeva	(South Korea) Lee Cho-Won (South Korea) Hong Da-Jung	(Thailand) Sophia Mulsap (Australia) Monika Wejnert (India) Sanaa Bhambri (South Korea) Han Sung-Hee	
May 12, 2008	Bucharest, Romania; Clay $10,000	(Romania) Simona Halep; 7–6^{(4)} 6–3	(France) Stephanie Vongsouthi	(Romania) Elora Dabija (Italy) Raffaella Bindi	(Romania) Ioana Ivan (Romania) Ionela-Andreea Iova (Romania) Laura-Ioana Andrei (Romania) Camelia Hristea	
May 12, 2008	Bucharest, Romania; Clay $10,000	(Slovakia) Klaudia Boczová (Slovakia) Romana Tabak; 6–2 6–0	(Romania) Ioana Ivan (Brazil) Vivian Segnini	(Romania) Elora Dabija (Italy) Raffaella Bindi	(Romania) Ioana Ivan (Romania) Ionela-Andreea Iova (Romania) Laura-Ioana Andrei (Romania) Camelia Hristea	
May 12, 2008	Bulungan, Indonesia; Hard $10,000	(China) Chen Liang; 6–7^{(5)} 6–2 6–2	(Indonesia) Lavinia Tananta	(Japan) Maki Arai (Japan) Tomoko Taira	(Vietnam) Ngo Viet-Ha (Indonesia) Ayu Fani Damayanti (China) Hao Jie (Russia) Elena Chernyakova	
May 12, 2008	Bulungan, Indonesia; Hard $10,000	(Indonesia) Lutfiana-Aris Budiharto (Indonesia) Beatrice Gumulya; 7–5 4–6 [11–9]	(China) Hao Jie (Indonesia) Lavinia Tananta	(Japan) Maki Arai (Japan) Tomoko Taira	(Vietnam) Ngo Viet-Ha (Indonesia) Ayu Fani Damayanti (China) Hao Jie (Russia) Elena Chernyakova	
May 12, 2008	Raleigh, North Carolina, United States; Clay $25,000	(United States) Chelsey Gullickson; 6–4 2–6 6–3	(United States) Lauren Albanese	(Ukraine) Tetiana Luzhanska (United States) Kimberly Couts	(United States) Madison Brengle (Austria) Nicole Rottmann (Brazil) Maria Fernanda Alves (United States) Theresa Logar	
May 12, 2008	Raleigh, North Carolina, United States; Clay $25,000	(United States) Kimberly Couts (Georgia (country)) Anna Tatishvili; 6–3 6–4	(Switzerland) Stefania Boffa (Austria) Nicole Rottmann	(Ukraine) Tetiana Luzhanska (United States) Kimberly Couts	(United States) Madison Brengle (Austria) Nicole Rottmann (Brazil) Maria Fernanda Alves (United States) Theresa Logar	
May 12, 2008	Szczecin, Poland; Clay $25,000	(Czech Republic) Barbora Záhlavová-Strýcová; 6–4 6–2	(Slovakia) Lenka Wienerová	(Poland) Katarzyna Piter (Netherlands) Michelle Gerards	(Slovakia) Ľubomíra Kurhajcová (Israel) Julia Glushko (Czech Republic) Tereza Hladíková (Czech Republic) Michaela Paštiková	
May 12, 2008	Szczecin, Poland; Clay $25,000	(Czech Republic) Iveta Gerlová (Czech Republic) Tereza Hladíková; 6–1 6–4	(Finland) Emma Laine (Serbia) Teodora Mirčić	(Poland) Katarzyna Piter (Netherlands) Michelle Gerards	(Slovakia) Ľubomíra Kurhajcová (Israel) Julia Glushko (Czech Republic) Tereza Hladíková (Czech Republic) Michaela Paštiková	
May 12, 2008	Kurume, Japan; Carpet $50,000	(Chinese Taipei) Chang Kai-Chen; 7–5 6–3	(Russia) Alexandra Panova	(Japan) Tomoko Yonemura (Japan) Erika Takao	(Japan) Kimiko Date-Krumm (Japan) Erika Sema (New Zealand) Ellen Barry (Japan) Tomoyo Takagishi	
May 12, 2008	Kurume, Japan; Carpet $50,000	(Chinese Taipei) Chang Kai-Chen (Chinese Taipei) Hwang I-hsuan; 6–3 2–6 [10–6]	(Japan) Erika Sema (Japan) Yurika Sema	(Japan) Tomoko Yonemura (Japan) Erika Takao	(Japan) Kimiko Date-Krumm (Japan) Erika Sema (New Zealand) Ellen Barry (Japan) Tomoyo Takagishi	
May 12, 2008	Saint-Gaudens, France; Clay $50,000	(Czech Republic) Petra Cetkovská; 6–4 6–4	(Spain) María José Martínez Sánchez	(Russia) Anastasia Pavlyuchenkova (Russia) Vesna Manasieva	(Russia) Elena Bovina (Spain) Carla Suárez Navarro (Spain) Sílvia Soler Espinosa (Russia) Ekaterina Ivanova	
May 12, 2008	Saint-Gaudens, France; Clay $50,000	(Chinese Taipei) Hsieh Su-wei (Canada) Marie-Ève Pelletier; 6–4 6–0	(South Africa) Chanelle Scheepers (France) Aurélie Védy	(Russia) Anastasia Pavlyuchenkova (Russia) Vesna Manasieva	(Russia) Elena Bovina (Spain) Carla Suárez Navarro (Spain) Sílvia Soler Espinosa (Russia) Ekaterina Ivanova	
May 19, 2008	Falkenberg, Sweden; Clay $10,000	(Sweden) Kristina Andlovic; 7–5 7–5	(Denmark) Hanne Skak Jensen	(Netherlands) Bibiane Schoofs (Sweden) Madeleine Saari-Bystrom	(Netherlands) Pauline Wong (Latvia) Līga Dekmeijere (Switzerland) Amra Sadiković (Sweden) Diana Eriksson	
May 19, 2008	Falkenberg, Sweden; Clay $10,000	(Sweden) Diana Eriksson (Denmark) Hanne Skak Jensen; 6–3 6–1	(Sweden) Anna Brazhnikova (Sweden) Madeleine Saari-Bystrom	(Netherlands) Bibiane Schoofs (Sweden) Madeleine Saari-Bystrom	(Netherlands) Pauline Wong (Latvia) Līga Dekmeijere (Switzerland) Amra Sadiković (Sweden) Diana Eriksson	
May 19, 2008	Galați, Romania; Clay $10,000	(Italy) Valentina Sulpizio; 6–2 7–6^{(2)}	(Slovakia) Kristína Kučová	(Brazil) Vivian Segnini (Romania) Alexandra Cadanțu	(Romania) Ioana Ivan (Bulgaria) Dalia Zafirova (Romania) Ionela-Andreea Iova (Romania) Veronica Popovici	
May 19, 2008	Galați, Romania; Clay $10,000	(Slovakia) Kristina Kučová (Italy) Valentina Sulpizio; 6–0 6–2	(Romania) Alexandra Cadanțu (Romania) Antonia Xenia Tout	(Brazil) Vivian Segnini (Romania) Alexandra Cadanțu	(Romania) Ioana Ivan (Bulgaria) Dalia Zafirova (Romania) Ionela-Andreea Iova (Romania) Veronica Popovici	
May 19, 2008	Gorizia, Italy; Clay $10,000	(Italy) Lisa Sabino; 6–1 6–0	(Italy) Stefania Chieppa	(Italy) Lisa Tognetti (Croatia) Darija Jurak	(Brazil) Roxane Vaisemberg (Italy) Julia Mayr (Slovakia) Nikola Vajdova (Italy) Elena Pioppo	
May 19, 2008	Gorizia, Italy; Clay $10,000	(Croatia) Darija Jurak (Italy) Lisa Sabino; 6–0 6–1	(Slovenia) Maja Kambič (Slovenia) Anja Prislan	(Italy) Lisa Tognetti (Croatia) Darija Jurak	(Brazil) Roxane Vaisemberg (Italy) Julia Mayr (Slovakia) Nikola Vajdova (Italy) Elena Pioppo	
May 19, 2008	Khon Kaen, Thailand; Hard $10,000	(South Korea) Lee Cho-Won; 6–2 6–0	(South Korea) Kim Sun-Jung	(South Korea) Jeong Yoon-Young (Vietnam) Thuy-Dung Nguyen	(India) Parul Goswami (Thailand) Nicha Lertpitaksinchai (Uzbekistan) Albina Khabibulina (Japan) Ai Yamamoto	
May 19, 2008	Khon Kaen, Thailand; Hard $10,000	(South Korea) Kim Sun-Jung (South Korea) Lee Cho-Won; 6–4 4–6 [10–4]	(China) Chen Hui (China) Duan Yingying	(South Korea) Jeong Yoon-Young (Vietnam) Thuy-Dung Nguyen	(India) Parul Goswami (Thailand) Nicha Lertpitaksinchai (Uzbekistan) Albina Khabibulina (Japan) Ai Yamamoto	
May 19, 2008	Landisville, Pennsylvania, United States; Hard $10,000	(United States) Kristie Ahn; 6–3 2–6 6–3	(Canada) Rebecca Marino	(Canada) Heidi El Tabakh (Bolivia) María Fernanda Álvarez Terán	(United States) Chieh-Yu Hsu (United States) Alexandra Mueller (United States) Sloane Stephens (United States) Michaela Kissell	
May 19, 2008	Landisville, Pennsylvania, United States; Hard $10,000	(United States) Audra Cohen (Canada) Heidi El Tabakh; 6–3 7–6^{(3)}	(Switzerland) Stefania Boffa (United Kingdom) Anna Fitzpatrick	(Canada) Heidi El Tabakh (Bolivia) María Fernanda Álvarez Terán	(United States) Chieh-Yu Hsu (United States) Alexandra Mueller (United States) Sloane Stephens (United States) Michaela Kissell	
May 19, 2008	Managua, Nicaragua; Hard $10,000	(Brazil) Nathalia Rossi; 3–6 6–1 6–4	(Colombia) Paula Zabala	(Brazil) Natalia Guitler (Peru) Ingrid Esperanza Vargas Calvo	(Chile) Camila Bernal (Peru) Mariana Demichelli Vergara (Netherlands) Nicole Monteiro (United States) Katie Ruckert	
May 19, 2008	Managua, Nicaragua; Hard $10,000	(Brazil) Natalia Guitler (Brazil) Nathalia Rossi; 3–6 7–6^{(2)} [11–9]	(United States) Kit Carson (Netherlands) Nicole Monteiro	(Brazil) Natalia Guitler (Peru) Ingrid Esperanza Vargas Calvo	(Chile) Camila Bernal (Peru) Mariana Demichelli Vergara (Netherlands) Nicole Monteiro (United States) Katie Ruckert	
May 19, 2008	Ra'anana, Israel; Hard $10,000	(Georgia (country)) Manana Shapakidze; 3–6 6–1 6–4	(Greece) Irini Georgatou	(Israel) Julia Glushko (Netherlands) Marcella Koek	(Israel) Olga Blank (Israel) Chen Astrogo (Israel) Orian Ben Haim (Russia) Margarita Lazareva	
May 19, 2008	Ra'anana, Israel; Hard $10,000	(Israel) Julia Glushko (Georgia (country)) Manana Shapakidze; 5–7 6–7^{(5)} [10–6]	(Israel) Chen Astrogo (Netherlands) Marcella Koek	(Israel) Julia Glushko (Netherlands) Marcella Koek	(Israel) Olga Blank (Israel) Chen Astrogo (Israel) Orian Ben Haim (Russia) Margarita Lazareva	
May 19, 2008	Moscow, Russia; Clay $25,000	(Russia) Nina Bratchikova; 3–6 6–1 7–5	(Russia) Ksenia Pervak	(Russia) Maria Kondratieva (Serbia) Teodora Mirčić	(Finland) Emma Laine (Russia) Tatiana Kotelnikova (Belarus) Ksenia Milevskaya (Netherlands) Chayenne Ewijk	
May 19, 2008	Moscow, Russia; Clay $25,000	(Finland) Emma Laine (Serbia) Teodora Mirčić; 7–6^{(5)} 6–2	(Russia) Maria Kondratieva (Ukraine) Oksana Teplyakova	(Russia) Maria Kondratieva (Serbia) Teodora Mirčić	(Finland) Emma Laine (Russia) Tatiana Kotelnikova (Belarus) Ksenia Milevskaya (Netherlands) Chayenne Ewijk	
May 19, 2008	Nagano, Japan; Carpet $25,000	(Japan) Erika Takao; 6–4 6–1	(South Korea) Lee Jin-A	(Chinese Taipei) Chan Chin-Wei (Japan) Shiho Hisamatsu	(Thailand) Montinee Tangphong (Japan) Chiaki Okadaue (Japan) Yurika Sema (Japan) Seiko Okamoto	
May 19, 2008	Nagano, Japan; Carpet $25,000	(Japan) Erika Sema (Japan) Yurika Sema; 7–6^{(1)} 6–3	(Japan) Maya Kato (Japan) Ayaka Maekawa	(Chinese Taipei) Chan Chin-Wei (Japan) Shiho Hisamatsu	(Thailand) Montinee Tangphong (Japan) Chiaki Okadaue (Japan) Yurika Sema (Japan) Seiko Okamoto	
May 26, 2008	Bangkok, Thailand; Hard $10,000	(South Korea) Yu Min-Hwa; 6–4 5–7 6–1	(South Korea) Kim Sun-Jung	(Thailand) Khunpak Issara (South Korea) Kim Joohyoung	(India) Ankita Bhambri (India) Parul Goswami (Indonesia) Lavinia Tananta (Thailand) Kanyapat Narattana	
May 26, 2008	Bangkok, Thailand; Hard $10,000	(Indonesia) Yayuk Basuki (Australia) Tiffany Welford; 2–6 7–6^{(7)} [10–4]	(Russia) Elina Gasanova (Indonesia) LaviniaTananta	(Thailand) Khunpak Issara (South Korea) Kim Joohyoung	(India) Ankita Bhambri (India) Parul Goswami (Indonesia) Lavinia Tananta (Thailand) Kanyapat Narattana	
May 26, 2008	Braga, Portugal; Clay $10,000	(Netherlands) Marlot Meddens; 7–5 6–2	(Colombia) Viky Núñez Fuentes	(Portugal) Frederica Piedade (United Kingdom) Tara Wigan	(Italy) Eleonora Punzo (Argentina) Tatiana Búa (Spain) Lucía Sainz (Argentina) Carla Beltrami	
May 26, 2008	Braga, Portugal; Clay $10,000	(Argentina) Carla Beltrami (Argentina) Tatiana Búa; 6–2 6–2	(Serbia) Bojana Borovnica (Spain) Lucía Sainz	(Portugal) Frederica Piedade (United Kingdom) Tara Wigan	(Italy) Eleonora Punzo (Argentina) Tatiana Búa (Spain) Lucía Sainz (Argentina) Carla Beltrami	
May 26, 2008	Budva, Montenegro; Clay $10,000	(Hungary) Palma Kiraly; 7–5 6–1	(Croatia) Tereza Mrdeža	(Serbia) Ljubica Avramović (Czech Republic) Teresa Malikova	(Serbia) Ema Polić (Serbia) Andjela Nemcevic (Austria) Nicole Rottmann (Slovenia) Jasmina Kajtazovič	
May 26, 2008	Budva, Montenegro; Clay $10,000	(Serbia) Ljubica Avramović (Serbia) Neda Kozić; 6–4 7–5	(Bulgaria) Biljana Pawlowa-Dimitrova (Croatia) Tamara Stojković	(Serbia) Ljubica Avramović (Czech Republic) Teresa Malikova	(Serbia) Ema Polić (Serbia) Andjela Nemcevic (Austria) Nicole Rottmann (Slovenia) Jasmina Kajtazovič	
May 26, 2008	Gaziantep, Turkey; Hard $10,000	(Turkey) Çağla Büyükakçay; 7–5 6–4	(Turkey) Pemra Özgen	(Israel) Chen Astrogo (Germany) Dominice Ripoll	(Australia) Daniela Scivetti (Australia) Marisa Gianotti (Israel) Keren Schlomo (Slovenia) Petra Pajalič	
May 26, 2008	Gaziantep, Turkey; Hard $10,000	(Turkey) Çağla Büyükakçay (Turkey) Pemra Özgen; 2–0 ret.	(Belarus) Volha Duko (Georgia (country)) Ana Jikia	(Israel) Chen Astrogo (Germany) Dominice Ripoll	(Australia) Daniela Scivetti (Australia) Marisa Gianotti (Israel) Keren Schlomo (Slovenia) Petra Pajalič	
May 26, 2008	Kharkiv, Ukraine; Clay $10,000	(Russia) Elena Kulikova; 6–4 7–6^{(5)}	(Ukraine) Anastasiya Vasylyeva	(Russia) Varvara Galanina (Ukraine) Oksana Khomyk	(Russia) Nadezda Gorbachkova (Ukraine) Yelyzaveta Rybakova (Ukraine) Lesia Tsurenko (Ukraine) Iuliia Sandrakova	
May 26, 2008	Kharkiv, Ukraine; Clay $10,000	(Ukraine) Valentyna Ivakhnenko (Ukraine) Anastasiya Kyrylova; 6–3 6–2	(Ukraine) Yuliya Lyndina (Ukraine) Oksana Pavlova	(Russia) Varvara Galanina (Ukraine) Oksana Khomyk	(Russia) Nadezda Gorbachkova (Ukraine) Yelyzaveta Rybakova (Ukraine) Lesia Tsurenko (Ukraine) Iuliia Sandrakova	
May 26, 2008	Olecko, Poland; Clay $10,000	(Poland) Edyta Cieplucha; 6–2 6–0	(Poland) Magdalena Kiszczyńska	(Denmark) Hanne Skak Jensen (Poland) Karolina Kosińska	(Poland) Sylwia Zagórska (Czech Republic) Karolína Plíšková (Switzerland) Conny Perrin (Poland) Justyna Jegiołka	
May 26, 2008	Olecko, Poland; Clay $10,000	(Poland) Olga Brózda (Poland) Magdalena Kiszczyńska; 6–4 6–2	(Sweden) Annie Goransson (Denmark) Hanne Skak Jensen	(Denmark) Hanne Skak Jensen (Poland) Karolina Kosińska	(Poland) Sylwia Zagórska (Czech Republic) Karolína Plíšková (Switzerland) Conny Perrin (Poland) Justyna Jegiołka	
May 26, 2008	Sumter, South Carolina, United States; Hard $10,000	(United States) Mallory Cecil; 3–6 7–6(6) 6–4	(United States) Theresa Logar	(United States) Mary Gambale (United States) Sloane Stephens	(Ukraine) Anastasia Kharchenko (Australia) Anne Wishink (Netherlands) Bo Verhulsdonk (Venezuela) Gabriela Paz	
May 26, 2008	Sumter, South Carolina, United States; Hard $10,000	(United States) Brooke Bolender (United States) Beatrice Capra; 2–6 6–2 [10–6]	(United States) Anna Lubinsky (Netherlands) Bo Verhulsdonk	(United States) Mary Gambale (United States) Sloane Stephens	(Ukraine) Anastasia Kharchenko (Australia) Anne Wishink (Netherlands) Bo Verhulsdonk (Venezuela) Gabriela Paz	
May 26, 2008	Tortosa, Spain; Clay $10,000	(Spain) Beatriz García Vidagany; 6–2 6–3	(United Kingdom) Amanda Carreras	(Germany) Kristina Steiert (Spain) Leticia Costas Moreira	(Mexico) Ximena Hermoso (Spain) Eva Fernández Brugués (Spain) Maite Gabarrús-Alonso (Spain) Yera Campos Molina	
May 26, 2008	Tortosa, Spain; Clay $10,000	(Italy) Elena Pioppo (Italy) Valentina Sulpizio; 7–6^{(5)} 6–1	(Spain) Yera Campos Molina (Spain) Irene Rehberger Bescos	(Germany) Kristina Steiert (Spain) Leticia Costas Moreira	(Mexico) Ximena Hermoso (Spain) Eva Fernández Brugués (Spain) Maite Gabarrús-Alonso (Spain) Yera Campos Molina	
May 26, 2008	Galatina, Italy; Clay $25,000	(Latvia) Anastasija Sevastova; 6–4 6–4	(Spain) Estrella Cabeza Candela	(Austria) Tina Schiechtl (Italy) Nathalie Viérin	(Germany) Anne Schäfer (Kyrgyzstan) Ksenia Palkina (Chile) Melisa Miranda (Spain) Sílvia Soler Espinosa	
May 26, 2008	Galatina, Italy; Clay $25,000	(Austria) Melanie Klaffner (Australia) Jessica Moore; 3–6 6–1 [10–6]	(Brazil) Maria Fernanda Alves (Argentina) María Irigoyen	(Austria) Tina Schiechtl (Italy) Nathalie Viérin	(Germany) Anne Schäfer (Kyrgyzstan) Ksenia Palkina (Chile) Melisa Miranda (Spain) Sílvia Soler Espinosa	
May 26, 2008	Gunma, Japan; Carpet $25,000	(Japan) Tomoko Yonemura; 6–0 6–3	(Japan) Kumiko Iijima	(Japan) Chiaki Okadaue (Thailand) Suchanun Viratprasert	(Japan) Junri Namigata (Japan) Erika Takao (Japan) Yurika Sema (China) Liu Wan-Ting	
May 26, 2008	Gunma, Japan; Carpet $25,000	(Japan) Erika Sema (Japan) Yurika Sema; 6–3 2–6 [10–7]	(Chinese Taipei) Chang Kai-chen (Chinese Taipei) Hwang I-hsuan	(Japan) Chiaki Okadaue (Thailand) Suchanun Viratprasert	(Japan) Junri Namigata (Japan) Erika Takao (Japan) Yurika Sema (China) Liu Wan-Ting	
May 26, 2008	Togliatti, Russia; Hard $25,000	(Russia) Nina Bratchikova; 6–3 6–0	(Austria) Patricia Mayr	(Russia) Elizaveta Tochilovskaya (Russia) Ksenia Pervak	(Serbia) Teodora Mirčić (Russia) Maria Zharkova (Uzbekistan) Iroda Tulyaganova (Russia) Natalia Ryzhonkova	
May 26, 2008	Togliatti, Russia; Hard $25,000	(Russia) Nina Bratchikova (Russia) Vasilisa Davydova; 6–3 5–7 [10–3]	(Czech Republic) Nikola Fraňková (Austria) Patricia Mayr	(Russia) Elizaveta Tochilovskaya (Russia) Ksenia Pervak	(Serbia) Teodora Mirčić (Russia) Maria Zharkova (Uzbekistan) Iroda Tulyaganova (Russia) Natalia Ryzhonkova	
May 26, 2008	Carson, California, United States; Hard $50,000	(United States) Mashona Washington; 7–5 6–4	(United States) Alexa Glatch	(Georgia (country)) Anna Tatishvili (United States) Lindsay Lee-Waters	(United States) Jamie Hampton (Mexico) Melissa Torres Sandoval (New Zealand) Sacha Jones (United States) Audra Cohen	
May 26, 2008	Carson, California, United States; Hard $50,000	(Indonesia) Romana Tedjakusuma (United States) Story Tweedie-Yates; 7–6(10) 4–6 [10–7]	(United States) Kimberly Couts (Georgia (country)) Anna Tatishvili	(Georgia (country)) Anna Tatishvili (United States) Lindsay Lee-Waters	(United States) Jamie Hampton (Mexico) Melissa Torres Sandoval (New Zealand) Sacha Jones (United States) Audra Cohen	

=== June ===
Week	Tournament	Winner	Runner-up	Semi finalists	Quarter finalists	Refs
June 2, 2008	Amarante, Portugal; Hard $10,000	(Canada) Mélanie Gloria; 6–2 6–3	(Spain) Yera Campos Molina	(Argentina) Tatiana Búa (Argentina) Vanesa Furlanetto	(Portugal) Frederica Piedade (Russia) Marina Melnikova (Portugal) Catarina Ferreira (Argentina) Carla Beltrami	
June 2, 2008	Amarante, Portugal; Hard $10,000	(Canada) Mélanie Gloria (Spain) Lucía Sainz; 7–6^{(3)} 6–4	(Argentina) Tatiana Búa (Colombia) Karen Castiblanco	(Argentina) Tatiana Búa (Argentina) Vanesa Furlanetto	(Portugal) Frederica Piedade (Russia) Marina Melnikova (Portugal) Catarina Ferreira (Argentina) Carla Beltrami	
June 2, 2008	Hilton Head Island, United States; Hard $10,000	(United States) Mallory Cecil; 6–3 3–6 6–2	(United States) Theresa Logar	(United Kingdom) Nicola Slater (United States) Megan Moulton-Levy	(United States) Alexandra Anghelescu (Bolivia) María Fernanda Álvarez Terán (Brazil) Nathalia Rossi (United States) Alexis Prousis	
June 2, 2008	Hilton Head Island, United States; Hard $10,000	(United States) Jennifer Elie (United States) Nadja Gilchrist; 6–1 0–6 [10–5]	(Brazil) Carolina Salge (United States) Keri Wong	(United Kingdom) Nicola Slater (United States) Megan Moulton-Levy	(United States) Alexandra Anghelescu (Bolivia) María Fernanda Álvarez Terán (Brazil) Nathalia Rossi (United States) Alexis Prousis	
June 2, 2008	İzmir, Turkey; Hard $10,000	(Turkey) Pemra Özgen; 6–2 7–6^{(5)}	(Brazil) Vivian Segnini	(Turkey) Çağla Büyükakçay (Belarus) Volha Duko	(Israel) Keren Shlomo (North Macedonia) Emilia Arnaudovska (Russia) Ekaterina Dranets (United Kingdom) Tara Moore	
June 2, 2008	İzmir, Turkey; Hard $10,000	(Turkey) Çağla Büyükakçay (Turkey) Pemra Özgen; 6–2 6–0	(North Macedonia) Emilia Arnaudovska (Ukraine) Yuliana Umanets	(Turkey) Çağla Büyükakçay (Belarus) Volha Duko	(Israel) Keren Shlomo (North Macedonia) Emilia Arnaudovska (Russia) Ekaterina Dranets (United Kingdom) Tara Moore	
June 2, 2008	Pitești, Romania; Clay $10,000	(Romania) Mihaela Buzărnescu; 6–0 6–3	(Hungary) Palma Kiraly	(Italy) Valentina Sulpizio (Romania) Alexandra Cadanțu	(Romania) Alice-Andrada Radu (Romania) Diana Gae (Romania) Anamaria Sere (Bulgaria) Tanya Germanlieva	
June 2, 2008	Pitești, Romania; Clay $10,000	(Romania) Laura-Ioana Andrei (Romania) Mihaela Buzărnescu; 7–5 3–6 [10–2]	(Romania) Simona Matei (Italy) Valentina Sulpizio	(Italy) Valentina Sulpizio (Romania) Alexandra Cadanțu	(Romania) Alice-Andrada Radu (Romania) Diana Gae (Romania) Anamaria Sere (Bulgaria) Tanya Germanlieva	
June 2, 2008	Grado, Italy; Clay $25,000	(Austria) Patricia Mayr; 6–4 7–6^{(1)}	(Croatia) Jasmina Tinjić	(Croatia) Ana Vrljić (Latvia) Anastasija Sevastova	(Italy) Federica Di Sarra (Spain) Estrella Cabeza Candela (Italy) Elisa Balsamo (Austria) Tina Schiechtl	
June 2, 2008	Grado, Italy; Clay $25,000	(Colombia) Mariana Duque Mariño (Austria) Melanie Klaffner; 6–1 6–2	(Mauritius) Marinne Giraud (Australia) Christina Wheeler	(Croatia) Ana Vrljić (Latvia) Anastasija Sevastova	(Italy) Federica Di Sarra (Spain) Estrella Cabeza Candela (Italy) Elisa Balsamo (Austria) Tina Schiechtl	
June 2, 2008	Surbiton, United Kingdom; Grass $50,000	(New Zealand) Marina Erakovic; 6–4 6–2	(United Kingdom) Anne Keothavong	(United States) Abigail Spears (Belgium) Yanina Wickmayer	(Russia) Regina Kulikova (United States) Carly Gullickson (Australia) Monique Adamczak (Thailand) Tamarine Tanasugarn	
June 2, 2008	Surbiton, United Kingdom; Grass $50,000	(United States) Julie Ditty (United States) Abigail Spears; 7–6^{(2)} 6–2	(United Kingdom) Sarah Borwell (United Kingdom) Elizabeth Thomas	(United States) Abigail Spears (Belgium) Yanina Wickmayer	(Russia) Regina Kulikova (United States) Carly Gullickson (Australia) Monique Adamczak (Thailand) Tamarine Tanasugarn	
June 2, 2008	Rome, Italy; Clay $75,000	(Italy) Tathiana Garbin; 6–4 4–6 7–6^{(6)}	(Austria) Yvonne Meusburger	(Australia) Jelena Dokić (Italy) Giulia Gabba	(Germany) Angelika Bachmann (Croatia) Jelena Kostanić Tošić (Russia) Elena Bovina (Germany) Julia Görges	
June 2, 2008	Rome, Italy; Clay $75,000	(Poland) Klaudia Jans (Poland) Alicja Rosolska; 6–3 6–1	(Russia) Alina Jidkova (Canada) Marie-Ève Pelletier	(Australia) Jelena Dokić (Italy) Giulia Gabba	(Germany) Angelika Bachmann (Croatia) Jelena Kostanić Tošić (Russia) Elena Bovina (Germany) Julia Görges	
June 9, 2008	Craiova, Romania; Clay $10,000	(Italy) Valentina Sulpizio; 6–2 6–4	(Italy) Agnese Zucchini	(Romania) Alexandra Damaschin (Italy) Anastasia Poltoratskaya	(Romania) Laura-Ioana Andrei (Armenia) Anna Movsisyan (Romania) Elora Dabija (Slovakia) Karin Morgosova	
June 9, 2008	Craiova, Romania; Clay $10,000	(Romania) Laura-Ioana Andrei (Romania) Diana Enache; 6–3 6–1	(Romania) Irina-Camelia Begu (Romania) Alexandra Damaschin	(Romania) Alexandra Damaschin (Italy) Anastasia Poltoratskaya	(Romania) Laura-Ioana Andrei (Armenia) Anna Movsisyan (Romania) Elora Dabija (Slovakia) Karin Morgosova	
June 9, 2008	Gausdal, Norway; Hard $10,000	(Russia) Natalia Ryzhonkova; 3–6 7–6^{(6)} 6–0	(Netherlands) Marcella Koek	(Germany) Anna Zaja (Norway) Helene Auensen	(South Africa) Tegan Edwards (Belgium) Sophie Cornerotte (United States) Tori Kinard (Slovenia) Petra Pajalič	
June 9, 2008	Gausdal, Norway; Hard $10,000	(Netherlands) Marcella Koek (Netherlands) Anouk Tigu; 6–4 6–4	(Belgium) Sophie Cornerotte (France) Anne-Valerie Evain	(Germany) Anna Zaja (Norway) Helene Auensen	(South Africa) Tegan Edwards (Belgium) Sophie Cornerotte (United States) Tori Kinard (Slovenia) Petra Pajalič	
June 9, 2008	Gurgaon, India; Hard $10,000	(India) Rushmi Chakravarthi; 6–4 6–2	(India) Ankita Bhambri	(India) Isha Lakhani (Vietnam) Thuy-Dung Nguyen	(India) Prerana-Mythri Appineni (India) Sanaa Bhambri (South Korea) Han Sung-hee (China) He Chun-Yan	
June 9, 2008	Gurgaon, India; Hard $10,000	(Russia) Elina Gasanova (India) Isha Lakhani; 6–3 6–4	(India) Ankita Bhambri (India) Sanaa Bhambri	(India) Isha Lakhani (Vietnam) Thuy-Dung Nguyen	(India) Prerana-Mythri Appineni (India) Sanaa Bhambri (South Korea) Han Sung-hee (China) He Chun-Yan	
June 9, 2008	Istanbul, Turkey; Hard $10,000	(Turkey) Pemra Özgen; 6–4 7–6^{(1)}	(Georgia (country)) Ekaterine Gorgodze	(Russia) Avgusta Tsybysheva (Georgia (country)) Oksana Kalashnikova	(Russia) Yuliya Kalabina (Georgia (country)) Manana Shapakidze (Israel) Keren Shlomo (Israel) Chen Astrogo	
June 9, 2008	Istanbul, Turkey; Hard $10,000	(Israel) Chen Astrogo (Belarus) Volha Duko; 7–5 1–6 [10–5]	(Bulgaria) Dessislava Mladenova (Turkey) Pemra Özgen	(Russia) Avgusta Tsybysheva (Georgia (country)) Oksana Kalashnikova	(Russia) Yuliya Kalabina (Georgia (country)) Manana Shapakidze (Israel) Keren Shlomo (Israel) Chen Astrogo	
June 9, 2008	Lenzerheide, Switzerland; Clay $10,000	(Slovakia) Klaudia Boczová; 6–3 6–1	(Netherlands) Michelle Gerards	(Germany) Kristina Steiert (Netherlands) Marlot Meddens	(Italy) Federica Denti (Luxembourg) Mandy Minella (Germany) Syna Kayser (Italy) Alice Balducci	
June 9, 2008	Lenzerheide, Switzerland; Clay $10,000	(Netherlands) Michelle Gerards (Netherlands) Marlot Meddens; 6–0 6–3	(Italy) Alice Balducci (Italy) Lisa Sabino	(Germany) Kristina Steiert (Netherlands) Marlot Meddens	(Italy) Federica Denti (Luxembourg) Mandy Minella (Germany) Syna Kayser (Italy) Alice Balducci	
June 9, 2008	Montemor-O-Novo, Portugal; Hard $10,000	(Canada) Mélanie Gloria; 6–7^{(2)} 6–3 6–1	(Portugal) Maria Joao Koehler	(Portugal) Frederica Piedade (Bulgaria) Elitsa Kostova	(Spain) Lucía Sainz (United States) Anne Yelsey (Argentina) Carla Beltrami (Latvia) Irina Kuzmina	
June 9, 2008	Montemor-O-Novo, Portugal; Hard $10,000	(Canada) Mélanie Gloria (Spain) Lucía Sainz; 6–1 6–1	(Argentina) Carla Beltrami (Argentina) Vanesa Furlanetto	(Portugal) Frederica Piedade (Bulgaria) Elitsa Kostova	(Spain) Lucía Sainz (United States) Anne Yelsey (Argentina) Carla Beltrami (Latvia) Irina Kuzmina	
June 9, 2008	Tokyo, Japan; Hard $10,000	(Japan) Kimiko Date-Krumm; 6–3 6–2	(Japan) Shiho Akita	(Chinese Taipei) Hsu Wen-hsin (Japan) Ayumi Oka	(Japan) Yuka Kuroda (China) Liu Shaozhuo (Japan) Ai Koga (China) Zhao Yijing	
June 9, 2008	Tokyo, Japan; Hard $10,000	(Japan) Maya Kato (Japan) Miki Miyamura; 6–4 6–2	(China) Liu Wanting (China) Zhao Yijing	(Chinese Taipei) Hsu Wen-hsin (Japan) Ayumi Oka	(Japan) Yuka Kuroda (China) Liu Shaozhuo (Japan) Ai Koga (China) Zhao Yijing	
June 9, 2008	Campobasso, Italy; Clay $25,000	(Slovenia) Maša Zec Peškirič; 6–3 6–3	(Germany) Anne Schäfer	(Russia) Ksenia Pervak (Spain) Estrella Cabeza Candela	(Croatia) Maria Abramović (Australia) Jessica Moore (Brazil) Roxane Vaisemberg (Romania) Anda Perianu	
June 9, 2008	Campobasso, Italy; Clay $25,000	(Argentina) María Irigoyen (Brazil) Roxane Vaisemberg; 6–3 6–2	(Italy) Nicole Clerico (Australia) Jessica Moore	(Russia) Ksenia Pervak (Spain) Estrella Cabeza Candela	(Croatia) Maria Abramović (Australia) Jessica Moore (Brazil) Roxane Vaisemberg (Romania) Anda Perianu	
June 9, 2008	El Paso United States; Hard $25,000	(Georgia (country)) Anna Tatishvili; 6–4 6–3	(United States) Lauren Albanese	(Chinese Taipei) Chan Chin-wei (United States) Kimberly Couts	(United States) Alexandra Mueller (Republic of Ireland) Kelly Liggan (Indonesia) Romana Tedjakusuma (United States) Julia Cohen	
June 9, 2008	El Paso United States; Hard $25,000	(United States) Lauren Albanese (South Africa) Surina De Beer; 6–3 6–3	(United States) Lindsay Lee-Waters (United States) Ashley Weinhold	(Chinese Taipei) Chan Chin-wei (United States) Kimberly Couts	(United States) Alexandra Mueller (Republic of Ireland) Kelly Liggan (Indonesia) Romana Tedjakusuma (United States) Julia Cohen	
June 9, 2008	Marseille, France; Clay $75,000+H	(Belgium) Kirsten Flipkens; 7–6^{(4)} 6–2	(France) Stéphanie Foretz	(Russia) Anna Lapushchenkova (Argentina) Jorgelina Cravero	(Spain) Sílvia Soler Espinosa (Romania) Ágnes Szatmári (Bulgaria) Sessil Karatantcheva (Estonia) Maret Ani	
June 9, 2008	Marseille, France; Clay $75,000+H	(Romania) Ágnes Szatmári (France) Aurélie Védy; 6–4 6–3	(Ukraine) Viktoriya Kutuzova (Russia) Anna Lapushchenkova	(Russia) Anna Lapushchenkova (Argentina) Jorgelina Cravero	(Spain) Sílvia Soler Espinosa (Romania) Ágnes Szatmári (Bulgaria) Sessil Karatantcheva (Estonia) Maret Ani	
June 9, 2008	Zlín, Czech Republic; Clay $75,000+H	(Germany) Anna-Lena Grönefeld; 6–3 4–6 6–1	(Croatia) Jelena Kostanić Tošić	(Switzerland) Stefanie Vögele (Czech Republic) Zuzana Ondrášková	(Slovenia) Polona Hercog (Slovakia) Michaela Pochabová (Germany) Angelika Bachmann (Czech Republic) Renata Voráčová	
June 9, 2008	Zlín, Czech Republic; Clay $75,000+H	(Czech Republic) Simona Dobrá (Czech Republic) Tereza Hladíková; 6–4 6–3	(Czech Republic) Lucie Hradecká (Czech Republic) Renata Voráčová	(Switzerland) Stefanie Vögele (Czech Republic) Zuzana Ondrášková	(Slovenia) Polona Hercog (Slovakia) Michaela Pochabová (Germany) Angelika Bachmann (Czech Republic) Renata Voráčová	
June 16, 2008	Alcobaça, Portugal; Hard $10,000	(Bulgaria) Elitsa Kostova; 3–6 6–2 6–2	(United Kingdom) Amanda Carreras	(Spain) Yera Campos Molina (Portugal) Ana Catarina Nogueira	(Portugal) Maria Joao Koehler (Argentina) Tatiana Búa (Peru) Claudia Razzeto (United States) Lena Litvak	
June 16, 2008	Alcobaça, Portugal; Hard $10,000	(United States) Lena Litvak (Colombia) Paula Zabala; 6–4 6–2	(Brazil) Verena Piccolo (Australia) Alison Shemon	(Spain) Yera Campos Molina (Portugal) Ana Catarina Nogueira	(Portugal) Maria Joao Koehler (Argentina) Tatiana Búa (Peru) Claudia Razzeto (United States) Lena Litvak	
June 16, 2008	Alkmaar, Netherlands; Clay $10,000	(Germany) Anna-Lena Grönefeld; 6–1 6–1	(Netherlands) Marlot Meddens	(Netherlands) Daniëlle Harmsen (Russia) Anastasia Poltoratskaya	(Netherlands) Renée Reinhard (Czech Republic) Jana Jandová (Ukraine) Lesia Tsurenko (Luxembourg) Mandy Minella	
June 16, 2008	Alkmaar, Netherlands; Clay $10,000	(Netherlands) Daniëlle Harmsen (Netherlands) Renée Reinhard; 6–2 7–6^{(10)}	(Serbia) Neda Kozić (Russia) Anastasia Poltoratskaya	(Netherlands) Daniëlle Harmsen (Russia) Anastasia Poltoratskaya	(Netherlands) Renée Reinhard (Czech Republic) Jana Jandová (Ukraine) Lesia Tsurenko (Luxembourg) Mandy Minella	
June 16, 2008	Bucharest, Romania; Clay $10,000	(Romania) Mihaela Buzărnescu; 6–2 6–2	(Italy) Federica Di Sarra	(Italy) Verdiana Verardi (Romania) Laura-Ioana Andrei	(Romania) Alexandra Dulgheru (Romania) Irina-Camelia Begu (Romania) Alexandra Cadanțu (Romania) Ioana Gașpar	
June 16, 2008	Bucharest, Romania; Clay $10,000	(Romania) Laura-Ioana Andrei (Romania) Mihaela Buzărnescu; 6–4 4–6 [10–6]	(Italy) Benedetta Davato (Italy) Valentina Sulpizio	(Italy) Verdiana Verardi (Romania) Laura-Ioana Andrei	(Romania) Alexandra Dulgheru (Romania) Irina-Camelia Begu (Romania) Alexandra Cadanțu (Romania) Ioana Gașpar	
June 16, 2008	Davos, Switzerland; Clay $10,000	(Switzerland) Amra Sadiković; 7–6^{(5)} 7–6^{(3)}	(Slovakia) Michaela Pochabová	(Italy) Lisa Sabino (Germany) Kristina Steiert	(Netherlands) Michelle Gerards (Germany) Hermon Brhane (Italy) Nicole Clerico (Austria) Janina Toljan	
June 16, 2008	Davos, Switzerland; Clay $10,000	(Hungary) Katalin Marosi (Brazil) Marina Tavares; 5–7 6–4 [10–7]	(Czech Republic) Kateřina Kramperová (Austria) Janina Toljan	(Italy) Lisa Sabino (Germany) Kristina Steiert	(Netherlands) Michelle Gerards (Germany) Hermon Brhane (Italy) Nicole Clerico (Austria) Janina Toljan	
June 16, 2008	Gausdal, Norway; Hard $10,000	(Russia) Natalia Ryzhonkova; 6–3 6–1	(Norway) Ulrikke Eikeri	(Netherlands) Anouk Tigu (United States) Tori Kinard	(Netherlands) Marcella Koek (France) Anne-Valerie Evain (United Kingdom) Lucy Warburton (Germany) Mona Barthel	
June 16, 2008	Gausdal, Norway; Hard $10,000	(Netherlands) Marcella Koek (Netherlands) Anouk Tigu; 6–0 7–5	(Belgium) Sophie Cornerotte (France) Anne-Valerie Evain	(Netherlands) Anouk Tigu (United States) Tori Kinard	(Netherlands) Marcella Koek (France) Anne-Valerie Evain (United Kingdom) Lucy Warburton (Germany) Mona Barthel	
June 16, 2008	Gurgaon, India; Hard $10,000	(India) Sanaa Bhambri; 7–5 6–1	(South Korea) Han Sung-hee	(India) Parija Maloo (India) Poojashree Venkatesha	(India) Ankita Bhambri (India) Parul Goswami (China) He Chun-Yan (India) Kumari-Sweta Solanki	
June 16, 2008	Gurgaon, India; Hard $10,000	(South Korea) Han Sung-hee (India) Parija Maloo; 6–3 6–4	(Australia) Cassandra Chan (Australia) Julia Moriarty	(India) Parija Maloo (India) Poojashree Venkatesha	(India) Ankita Bhambri (India) Parul Goswami (China) He Chun-Yan (India) Kumari-Sweta Solanki	
June 16, 2008	Houston, United States; Hard $10,000	(United States) Kristie Ahn; 7–6^{(6)} 0–6 7–6^{(2)}	(Chinese Taipei) Chan Chin-wei	(United States) Beatrice Capra (United States) Sanaz Marand	(India) Shikha Uberoi (Norway) Nina Munch-Søgaard (United States) Amanda McDowell (Japan) Tomoko Dokei	
June 16, 2008	Houston, United States; Hard $10,000	(United States) Catrina Thompson (United States) Christian Thompson; 6–3 7–5	(United States) Kim-Ahn Nguyen (India) Shikha Uberoi	(United States) Beatrice Capra (United States) Sanaz Marand	(India) Shikha Uberoi (Norway) Nina Munch-Søgaard (United States) Amanda McDowell (Japan) Tomoko Dokei	
June 16, 2008	Montpellier, France; Clay $10,000	(Argentina) Verónica Spiegel; 7–6^{(5)} 6–4	(China) Lu Jingjing	(Russia) Varvara Galanina (France) Estelle Guisard	(France) Natalie Piquion (France) Stephanie Vongsouthi (France) Amandine Singla (Spain) Rebeca Bou Nogueiro	
June 16, 2008	Montpellier, France; Clay $10,000	(China) Lu Jingjing (Argentina) Verónica Spiegel; 7–5 6–7^{(5)} [10–7]	(France) Sherazad Benamar (France) Charlotte Rodier	(Russia) Varvara Galanina (France) Estelle Guisard	(France) Natalie Piquion (France) Stephanie Vongsouthi (France) Amandine Singla (Spain) Rebeca Bou Nogueiro	
June 16, 2008	Sutama, Yamanashi, Japan; Clay $10,000	(Japan) Miki Miyamura; 6–3 6–3	(Japan) Maki Arai	(Japan) Ayumi Oka (Japan) Remi Tezuka	(Japan) Kei Sekine (Japan) Ayaki Maekawa (Japan) Maya Kato (Japan) Chihiro Takayama	
June 16, 2008	Sutama, Yamanashi, Japan; Clay $10,000	(Japan) Ayaka Maekawa (Japan) Ayumi Oka; 6–3 6–4	(Japan) Kazusa Ito (Japan) Tomoko Taira	(Japan) Ayumi Oka (Japan) Remi Tezuka	(Japan) Kei Sekine (Japan) Ayaki Maekawa (Japan) Maya Kato (Japan) Chihiro Takayama	
June 16, 2008	Turin, Italy; Clay $10,000	(Kyrgyzstan) Ksenia Palkina; 6–0 6–4	(Italy) Giulia Gatto-Monticone	(Italy) Cristina Celani (Croatia) Tereza Mrdeža	(Italy) Stefania Chieppa (Austria) Julia Mayr (Italy) Anastasia Grymalska (Italy) Federica Quercia	
June 16, 2008	Turin, Italy; Clay $10,000	(Belarus) Tatsiana Kapshai (Russia) Aleksandra Razumova; 6–7^{(4)} 6–2 [10–8]	(Italy) Stefania Chieppa (Italy) Giulia Gatto-Monticone	(Italy) Cristina Celani (Croatia) Tereza Mrdeža	(Italy) Stefania Chieppa (Austria) Julia Mayr (Italy) Anastasia Grymalska (Italy) Federica Quercia	
June 16, 2008	Istanbul, Turkey; Hard $25,000	(Germany) Stephanie Gehrlein; 6–2 6–3	(Russia) Arina Rodionova	(Greece) Anna Gerasimou (Turkey) Pemra Özgen	(Russia) Yuliya Kalabina (Georgia (country)) Sofia Shapatava (Austria) Patricia Mayr (Slovakia) Lenka Tvarošková	
June 16, 2008	Istanbul, Turkey; Hard $25,000	(Serbia) Teodora Mirčić (Slovakia) Lenka Tvarošková; 7–5 7–6^{(4)}	(Switzerland) Stefania Boffa (Czech Republic) Nikola Fraňková	(Greece) Anna Gerasimou (Turkey) Pemra Özgen	(Russia) Yuliya Kalabina (Georgia (country)) Sofia Shapatava (Austria) Patricia Mayr (Slovakia) Lenka Tvarošková	
June 23, 2008	Almaty, Kazakhstan; Clay $10,000	(Russia) Yuliya Kalabina; 6–4 6–3	(Uzbekistan) Albina Khabibulina	(Russia) Marina Lushchinta (Portugal) Magali de Lattre	(Kyrgyzstan) Bermet Duvanaeva (Russia) Diana Isaeva (Russia) Anastasia Putilina (Russia) Svetlana Smirnova	
June 23, 2008	Almaty, Kazakhstan; Clay $10,000	(Belarus) Volha Duko (Russia) Yuliya Kalabina; 6–4 6–4	(Russia) Aleksandra Razumova (Russia) Svetlana Smirnova	(Russia) Marina Lushchinta (Portugal) Magali de Lattre	(Kyrgyzstan) Bermet Duvanaeva (Russia) Diana Isaeva (Russia) Anastasia Putilina (Russia) Svetlana Smirnova	
June 23, 2008	Breda, Netherlands; Clay $10,000	(Russia) Olga Kalyuzhnaya; 4–6 6–2 6–4	(Netherlands) Daniëlle Harmsen	(Ukraine) Lesia Tsurenko (Belarus) Ima Bohush	(Netherlands) Bibiane Schoofs (France) Morgane Pons (Algeria) Samia Medjahdi (Belgium) Appollonia Melzani	
June 23, 2008	Breda, Netherlands; Clay $10,000	(Netherlands) Daniëlle Harmsen (Netherlands) Renée Reinhard; Walkover	(Belarus) Ima Bohush (Ukraine) Lesia Tsurenko	(Ukraine) Lesia Tsurenko (Belarus) Ima Bohush	(Netherlands) Bibiane Schoofs (France) Morgane Pons (Algeria) Samia Medjahdi (Belgium) Appollonia Melzani	
June 23, 2008	Budapest, Hungary; Clay $10,000	(Germany) Dominice Ripoll; 6–4 4–6 6–0	(Hungary) Aleksandra Filipovski	(Hungary) Katalin Marosi (Australia) Olivia Rogowska	(Poland) Edyta Cieplucha (Hungary) Palma Kiraly (Slovakia) Monika Kochanová (Poland) Klaudia Gawlik	
June 23, 2008	Budapest, Hungary; Clay $10,000	(New Zealand) Shona Lee (Hungary) Virág Németh; 6–2 6–2	(Hungary) Palma Kiraly (Slovakia) Monika Kochanová	(Hungary) Katalin Marosi (Australia) Olivia Rogowska	(Poland) Edyta Cieplucha (Hungary) Palma Kiraly (Slovakia) Monika Kochanová (Poland) Klaudia Gawlik	
June 23, 2008	Sarajevo, Bosnia and Herzegovina; Clay $10,000	(Croatia) Tereza Mrdeža; 6–3 6–0	(Slovenia) Jasmina Kajtazovič	(Serbia) Zorica Petrov (Switzerland) Amra Sadiković	(Slovenia) Mika Urbančič (Serbia) Ema Polić (Serbia) Karolina Jovanović (Belgium) Davinia Lobbinger	
June 23, 2008	Sarajevo, Bosnia and Herzegovina; Clay $10,000	(Italy) Martina Caciotti (Slovenia) Mika Urbančič; 6–4 6–3	(Bosnia and Herzegovina) Ema Burgić (Serbia) Karolina Jovanović	(Serbia) Zorica Petrov (Switzerland) Amra Sadiković	(Slovenia) Mika Urbančič (Serbia) Ema Polić (Serbia) Karolina Jovanović (Belgium) Davinia Lobbinger	
June 23, 2008	Wichita, Kansas, United States; Hard $10,000	(United States) Lauren Embree; 6–3 6–4	(United States) Jamie Hampton	(United States) Jacqueline Cako (United States) Anna Lubinsky	(United States) Sloane Stephens (United States) Keilly Ulery (United States) Brooke Bolender (United States) Macall Harkins	
June 23, 2008	Wichita, Kansas, United States; Hard $10,000	(United States) Christina McHale (United States) Sloane Stephens; 6–3 6–2	(Slovakia) Dominika Diešková (Brazil) Ana Clara Duarte	(United States) Jacqueline Cako (United States) Anna Lubinsky	(United States) Sloane Stephens (United States) Keilly Ulery (United States) Brooke Bolender (United States) Macall Harkins	
June 23, 2008	Getxo, Spain; Clay $25,000	(Spain) Estrella Cabeza Candela; 6–4 6–4	(Netherlands) Chayenne Ewijk	(Spain) Eva Fernández Brugués (Spain) Sílvia Soler Espinosa	(Austria) Melanie Klaffner (Argentina) Florencia Molinero (Spain) Rebeca Bou Nogueiro (Spain) Eloisa Compostizo de Andrés	
June 23, 2008	Getxo, Spain; Clay $25,000	(France) Julie Coin (United States) Story Tweedie-Yates; 6–3 6–1	(Spain) Estrella Cabeza Candela (Spain) Sara del Barrio Aragón	(Spain) Eva Fernández Brugués (Spain) Sílvia Soler Espinosa	(Austria) Melanie Klaffner (Argentina) Florencia Molinero (Spain) Rebeca Bou Nogueiro (Spain) Eloisa Compostizo de Andrés	
June 23, 2008	Kristinehamn, Sweden; Clay $25,000	(Romania) Simona Halep; 6–3 6–2	(Germany) Anne Schäfer	(Belarus) Ksenia Milevskaya (Sweden) Johanna Larsson	(Belgium) Tamaryn Hendler (Bulgaria) Dia Evtimova (Slovenia) Maša Zec Peškirič (Netherlands) Nicole Thyssen	
June 23, 2008	Kristinehamn, Sweden; Clay $25,000	(Austria) Patricia Mayr (Slovakia) Lenka Tvarošková; 6–3 6–4	(Belgium) Tamaryn Hendler (Finland) Emma Laine	(Belarus) Ksenia Milevskaya (Sweden) Johanna Larsson	(Belgium) Tamaryn Hendler (Bulgaria) Dia Evtimova (Slovenia) Maša Zec Peškirič (Netherlands) Nicole Thyssen	
June 23, 2008	Padova, Italy; Clay $25,000	(Croatia) Nika Ožegović; 7–5 6–3	(Kyrgyzstan) Ksenia Palkina	(Serbia) Ana Jovanović (Czech Republic) Hana Šromová	(Italy) Alberta Brianti (Bosnia and Herzegovina) Sandra Martinović (Slovakia) Dominika Nociarová (Czech Republic) Sandra Záhlavová	
June 23, 2008	Padova, Italy; Clay $25,000	(Romania) Anda Perianu (Romania) Liana Ungur; 6–3 6–3	(Argentina) Mailen Auroux (Germany) Carmen Klaschka	(Serbia) Ana Jovanović (Czech Republic) Hana Šromová	(Italy) Alberta Brianti (Bosnia and Herzegovina) Sandra Martinović (Slovakia) Dominika Nociarová (Czech Republic) Sandra Záhlavová	
June 23, 2008	Périgueux, France; Clay $25,000	(Germany) Anna-Lena Grönefeld; 6–3 6–3	(France) Florence Haring	(Ukraine) Yevgenia Savranska (Czech Republic) Iveta Gerlová	(Canada) Marie-Ève Pelletier (France) Stephanie Vongsouthi (Argentina) Agustina Lepore (China) Lu Jingjing	
June 23, 2008	Périgueux, France; Clay $25,000	(Germany) Anna-Lena Grönefeld (Turkey) İpek Şenoğlu; 6–3 6–4	(China) Han Xinyun (China) Xu Yifan	(Ukraine) Yevgenia Savranska (Czech Republic) Iveta Gerlová	(Canada) Marie-Ève Pelletier (France) Stephanie Vongsouthi (Argentina) Agustina Lepore (China) Lu Jingjing	
June 23, 2008	Qianshan, China; Hard $25,000	(China) Chen Yanchong; 4–6 6–4 6–4	(China) Liang Chen	(China) Liu Shaozhuo (Thailand) Nudnida Luangnam	(Thailand) Montinee Tangphong (China) Xie Yanze (Turkey) Pemra Özgen (China) Guo Lu	
June 23, 2008	Qianshan, China; Hard $25,000	(Japan) Natsumi Hamamura (Japan) Remi Tezuka; 6–4 6–0	(Japan) Yuka Kuroda (Japan) Tomoko Sugano	(China) Liu Shaozhuo (Thailand) Nudnida Luangnam	(Thailand) Montinee Tangphong (China) Xie Yanze (Turkey) Pemra Özgen (China) Guo Lu	
June 30, 2008	Cremona, Italy; Clay $10,000	(Germany) Korina Perkovic; 6–1 6–4	(France) Aurélie Védy	(Italy) Benedetta Davato (Russia) Nadejda Guskova	(Italy) Alice Moroni (Italy) Martina Caregaro (Italy) Gabriella Polito (Italy) Paola Cigui	
June 30, 2008	Cremona, Italy; Clay $10,000	(Russia) Nadejda Guskova (Russia) Elena Kulikova; 6–4 6–1	(Italy) Benedetta Davato (Italy) Lisa Sabino	(Italy) Benedetta Davato (Russia) Nadejda Guskova	(Italy) Alice Moroni (Italy) Martina Caregaro (Italy) Gabriella Polito (Italy) Paola Cigui	
June 30, 2008	Damascus, Syria; Hard $10,000	(Portugal) Magali de Lattre; 7–5 6–2	(Bulgaria) Jaklin Alawi	(Oman) Fatma Al-Nabhani (Armenia) Tatevik Yedigaryan	(Austria) Pamela Amon (United Kingdom) Tara Wigan (India) Shivika Burman (Russia) Anna Morgina	
June 30, 2008	Damascus, Syria; Hard $10,000	(Turkey) Eylul Benli (Australia) Jade Hopper; 6–1 6–2	(India) Shivika Burman (Portugal) Magali de Lattre	(Oman) Fatma Al-Nabhani (Armenia) Tatevik Yedigaryan	(Austria) Pamela Amon (United Kingdom) Tara Wigan (India) Shivika Burman (Russia) Anna Morgina	
June 30, 2008	Oviedo, Spain; Hard $10,000	(Spain) Lara Arruabarrena Vecino; 7–6^{(2)} 6–4	(Germany) Hermon Brhane	(Argentina) Carla Beltrami (Argentina) Vanesa Furlanetto	(Russia) Julia Parasyuk (Spain) Ana Belzunce Crompin (Armenia) Anna Movsisyan (France) Adeline Gonçalves	
June 30, 2008	Oviedo, Spain; Hard $10,000	(Spain) Melisa Cabrera Handt (Spain) Irene Rehburger Bescos; 6–3 3–6 [10–4]	(South Korea) Kim So-yeon (Armenia) Anna Movsisyan	(Argentina) Carla Beltrami (Argentina) Vanesa Furlanetto	(Russia) Julia Parasyuk (Spain) Ana Belzunce Crompin (Armenia) Anna Movsisyan (France) Adeline Gonçalves	
June 30, 2008	Prokuplje, Serbia; Clay $10,000	(Serbia) Aleksandra Krunić; 6–4 6–1	(Bulgaria) Tanya Germanlieva	(Hungary) Palma Kiraly (Slovakia) Zuzana Zlochová	(Serbia) Karolina Jovanović (Switzerland) Conny Perrin (Slovakia) Veronika Ciganiková (Slovenia) Anja Prislan	
June 30, 2008	Prokuplje, Serbia; Clay $10,000	(Serbia) Ljubica Avramović (Serbia) Karolina Jovanović; 7–6^{(4)} 6–4	(Hungary) Aleksandra Filipovski (Hungary) Virág Németh	(Hungary) Palma Kiraly (Slovakia) Zuzana Zlochová	(Serbia) Karolina Jovanović (Switzerland) Conny Perrin (Slovakia) Veronika Ciganiková (Slovenia) Anja Prislan	
June 30, 2008	Båstad, Sweden; Clay $25,000	(Slovakia) Klaudia Boczová; 1–6 6–2 6–2	(Germany) Anne Schäfer	(Slovakia) Lenka Tvarošková (Austria) Patricia Mayr	(Netherlands) Nicole Thyssen (Russia) Ksenia Pervak (Slovenia) Maša Zec Peškirič (Sweden) Johanna Larsson	
June 30, 2008	Båstad, Sweden; Clay $25,000	(Slovakia) Klaudia Boczová (Netherlands) Nicole Thyssen; 6–2 6–1	(Germany) Anne Schäfer (Hong Kong) Zhang Ling	(Slovakia) Lenka Tvarošková (Austria) Patricia Mayr	(Netherlands) Nicole Thyssen (Russia) Ksenia Pervak (Slovenia) Maša Zec Peškirič (Sweden) Johanna Larsson	
June 30, 2008	Mont-De-Marsan, France; Clay $25,000	(Belarus) Anastasiya Yakimova; 6–3 1–6 6–4	(Greece) Anna Gerasimou	(France) Stephanie Vongsouthi (Russia) Maria Kondratieva	(France) Laura Thorpe (Spain) Sílvia Soler Espinosa (Mauritius) Marinne Giraud (China) Lu Jingjing	
June 30, 2008	Mont-De-Marsan, France; Clay $25,000	(Turkey) İpek Şenoğlu (Portugal) Neuza Silva; 6–4 6–2	(Austria) Melanie Klaffner (Portugal) Frederica Piedade	(France) Stephanie Vongsouthi (Russia) Maria Kondratieva	(France) Laura Thorpe (Spain) Sílvia Soler Espinosa (Mauritius) Marinne Giraud (China) Lu Jingjing	
June 30, 2008	Stuttgart, Germany; Clay $25,000	(Germany) Stephanie Gehrlein; 6–0 6–2	(Ukraine) Yevgenia Savranska	(Russia) Anastasia Poltoratskaya (Australia) Jelena Dokić	(Switzerland) Stefanie Vögele (Italy) Elena Pioppo (Croatia) Darija Jurak (Germany) Kristina Barrois	
June 30, 2008	Stuttgart, Germany; Clay $25,000	(Germany) Kristina Barrois (Germany) Laura Siegemund; 6–3 6–4	(Hungary) Katalin Marosi (Brazil) Marina Tavares	(Russia) Anastasia Poltoratskaya (Australia) Jelena Dokić	(Switzerland) Stefanie Vögele (Italy) Elena Pioppo (Croatia) Darija Jurak (Germany) Kristina Barrois	
June 30, 2008	Toruń, Poland; Clay $25,000	(Belarus) Ekaterina Dzehalevich; 6–3 2–6 7–6^{(2)}	(Slovakia) Dominika Nociarová	(Belarus) Ksenia Milevskaya (Czech Republic) Sandra Záhlavová	(Russia) Anastasia Pivovarova (Ukraine) Oksana Teplyakova (Romania) Liana Ungur (Romania) Mihaela Buzărnescu	
June 30, 2008	Toruń, Poland; Clay $25,000	(Poland) Olga Brózda (Poland) Magdalena Kiszczyńska; 4–6 6–4 [10–2]	(Romania) Mihaela Buzărnescu (Russia) Anastasia Pivovarova	(Belarus) Ksenia Milevskaya (Czech Republic) Sandra Záhlavová	(Russia) Anastasia Pivovarova (Ukraine) Oksana Teplyakova (Romania) Liana Ungur (Romania) Mihaela Buzărnescu	
June 30, 2008	Waterloo, Canada; Clay $25,000	(United States) Alexandra Mueller; 6–3 6–3	(Canada) Sharon Fichman	(Canada) Maureen Drake (United States) Lauren Albanese	(United States) Katie Ruckert (United States) Alexis Prousis (United States) Danielle Mills (United States) Megan Moulton-Levy	
June 30, 2008	Waterloo, Canada; Clay $25,000	(Japan) Akiko Yonemura (Japan) Tomoko Yonemura; 6–1 4–6 [10–3]	(United States) Lauren Albanese (United States) Alexandra Mueller	(Canada) Maureen Drake (United States) Lauren Albanese	(United States) Katie Ruckert (United States) Alexis Prousis (United States) Danielle Mills (United States) Megan Moulton-Levy	
June 30, 2008	Boston, United States; Hard $50,000	(Georgia (country)) Anna Tatishvili; 2–6 6–1 6–3	(Chinese Taipei) Chan Chin-wei	(United States) Julie Ditty (Canada) Stéphanie Dubois	(South Africa) Natalie Grandin (United States) Alexandra Stevenson (United States) Varvara Lepchenko (India) Sunitha Rao	
June 30, 2008	Boston, United States; Hard $50,000	(Chinese Taipei) Chan Chin-wei (South Africa) Natalie Grandin; 6–4 6–3	(France) Youlia Fedossova (United States) Varvara Lepchenko	(United States) Julie Ditty (Canada) Stéphanie Dubois	(South Africa) Natalie Grandin (United States) Alexandra Stevenson (United States) Varvara Lepchenko (India) Sunitha Rao	
June 30, 2008	Cuneo, Italy; Clay $100,000	(Italy) Tathiana Garbin; 6–3 6–1	(Romania) Sorana Cîrstea	(Spain) Lourdes Domínguez Lino (Russia) Elena Bovina	(France) Olivia Sanchez (Austria) Yvonne Meusburger (Italy) Alberta Brianti (Ukraine) Mariya Koryttseva	
June 30, 2008	Cuneo, Italy; Clay $100,000	(Estonia) Maret Ani (Czech Republic) Renata Voráčová; 6–1 6–2	(Ukraine) Olga Savchuk (Russia) Marina Shamayko	(Spain) Lourdes Domínguez Lino (Russia) Elena Bovina	(France) Olivia Sanchez (Austria) Yvonne Meusburger (Italy) Alberta Brianti (Ukraine) Mariya Koryttseva	

== See also ==
- 2008 ITF Women's Circuit (January–March)
- 2008 ITF Women's Circuit (July–September)
