= Shona Lee =

New Zealand tennis player

- Country (sports): New Zealand
- Residence: Auckland, New Zealand
- Born: 19 August 1988 (age 37) Singapore
- Turned pro: 2004
- Retired: 2010
- Plays: Right-handed (two-handed backhand)
- Prize money: US$20,955

Singles
- Career record: 60–94
- Career titles: 0
- Highest ranking: 583 (22 October 2007)

Doubles
- Career record: 47–68
- Career titles: 0 WTA, 1 ITF
- Highest ranking: 407 (21 July 2008)

Team competitions
- Fed Cup: 2–1
- Last updated on: 5 April 2017.

Shona Lee (born 19 August 1988) is a retired Singaporean-born New Zealand female tennis player.

Lee attended St Cuthbert's College, Auckland.

== Tennis career ==
Lee has won one doubles titles on the ITF circuit in her career. On 22 October 2007, she reached her best singles ranking of world number 583. On 21 July 2008, she peaked at world number 407 in the doubles rankings.

Shona Lee retired from tennis 2010.

Playing for New Zealand Fed Cup team at the Fed Cup, Lee has a win–loss record of 2–1.

Lee made her WTA main draw debut at the 2009 ASB Classic, in the doubles main draw partnering Kairangi Vano. They lost their only match to Edina Gallovits-Hall and Eva Hrdinová; and earned $860 in prize money.

== Fed Cup participation ==
=== Doubles ===
Edition	Stage	Date	Location	Against	Surface	Partner	Opponents	W/L	Score
2007 Fed Cup; Asia/Oceania Zone Group I	R/R	16 April 2007	Christchurch, New Zealand	Jordan	Hard	(New Zealand) Leanne Baker	Sahar Al Disi; Leen Irani	W	6–0, 6–0
2007 Fed Cup; Asia/Oceania Zone Group I	R/R	20 April 2007	Christchurch, New Zealand	Kazakhstan	Hard	(New Zealand) Dianne Hollands	Tatyana Ignatchenko; Yekaterina Morozova	W	6–4, 6–1
2009 Fed Cup; Asia/Oceania Zone Group I	P/O	7 February 2009	Perth, Australia	Australia	Hard	(New Zealand) Kairangi Vano	Casey Dellacqua; Rennae Stubbs	L	2–6, 2–6

== ITF finals (1–3) ==
=== Doubles (1–3) ===
Legend $100,000 tournaments $75,000 tournaments $50,000 tournaments $25,000 tournaments $10,000 tournaments	Finals by surface Hard (0–1) Clay (1–2) Grass (0–0) Carpet (0–0)

Result	Date	Category	Tournament	Surface	Partner	Opponents	Score
Runner-up	4 September 2006	$10,000	Hope Island, Australia	Hard	(Australia) Karolina Wlodarczak	(Australia) Shannon Golds (Australia) Lucia Gonzalez	4–6, 6–7^{(2–7)}
Runner-up	28 April 2008	$10,000	Bucharest, Romania	Clay	(Ukraine) Oksana Khomyk	(Romania) Simona Halep (Romania) Ionela-Andreea Iova	3–6, 1–6
Winner	23 June 2008	$10,000	Budapest, Hungary	Clay	(Hungary) Virág Németh	(Hungary) Palma Kiraly (Slovakia) Monika Kochanová	6–2, 6–2
Runner-up	7 July 2008	$10,000	Garching bei München, Germany	Clay	(Germany) Dominice Ripoll	(Croatia) Vlatka Jovanović (Argentina) Salome Llaguno	6–1, 2–6, [6–10]

== ITF junior results ==
=== Singles (0/1) ===
Legend
Junior Grand Slam
Category GA
Category G1
Category G2
Category G3
Category G4
Category G5

Result	Date	Tournament	Location	Surface	Opponent	Score
Runner-up	17 July 2005	RADO ITF Northern Territory Junior Championships	Darwin, Australia	Hard	(New Zealand) Sacha Jones	1–6, 3–6

=== Doubles (2/3) ===
Legend
Junior Grand Slam
Category GA
Category G1
Category G2
Category G3
Category G4
Category G5

Result	Date	Tournament	Location	Surface	Partner	Opponents	Score
Runner-up	26 July 2003	South Pacific Junior Championships	Lautoka, Fiji	Hard	(New Zealand) Lucy Cole	(Australia) Ewa Losinski (Australia) Elizabeth Walker	3–6, 6–7^{(4–7)}
Runner-up	21 August 2003	Oceania Closed Junior Championships	Lautoka, Fiji	Hard	(New Zealand) Marina Erakovic	(Australia) Daniella Jeflea (Australia) Jessica Engels	2–6, 6–7^{(12–14)}
Winner	14 December 2003	Perth ITF	Perth, Australia	Hard	(New Zealand) Nicole Douglas	(Australia) Ewa Losinski (Australia) Elizabeth Walker	W/O
Winner	12 February 2004	Auckland 18 & Under Summer Championships	Auckland, New Zealand	Hard	(New Zealand) Lucy Cole	(Japan) Akiko Minami (Australia) Natalie Solevski	6–4, 6–2
Runner-up	24 July 2005	New Zealand 18 & Under Indoor Championships	Auckland, New Zealand	Hard (i)	(Australia) Johanna Morrison	(New Zealand) Hannah Fick (New Zealand) Kairangi Vano	6–4, 6–7^{(3–7)}, 0–1 ret.
