= Michelle Gerards =

Dutch tennis player

- Country (sports): Netherlands
- Born: 8 July 1984 (age 40); Heerlen, Netherlands
- Plays: Right-handed (two-handed backhand)
- Prize money: $86,524

Singles
- Career record: 238–129
- Career titles: 11 ITF
- Highest ranking: No. 207 (4 July 2005)

Doubles
- Career record: 78–53
- Career titles: 9 ITF
- Highest ranking: No. 219 (22 August 2005)

Team competitions
- Fed Cup: 3–1

Michelle Gerards (born 8 July 1984) is a former professional tennis player from the Netherlands.

== Biography ==
A right-handed player from Limburg, Gerards was the Dutch under-18 champion at the age of 13 and was a junior quarterfinalist at the 1999 French Open.

Most of her professional career was spent on the ITF Women's Circuit, reaching a best ranking in singles of 207 in the world. She made WTA Tour main-draw appearances at the 1999 Sanex Trophy in Knokke-Heist and 2000 Belgian Open, both times as a wildcard.

Gerards featured in four Fed Cup ties for the Netherlands. In 2005, she played two doubles matches, partnering Dutch veteran Brenda Schultz-McCarthy, winning both, over Poland and Luxembourg. When she returned to the Fed Cup team in 2009, it was as a singles player and she won one match, over Claudine Schaul of Luxembourg.

== ITF Circuit finals ==
$25,000 tournaments
$10,000 tournaments

=== Singles: 21 (11 titles, 10 runner-ups) ===
Outcome	No.	Date	Tournament	Surface	Opponent	Score
Runner-up	1.	18 August 2002	ITF Koksijde, Belgium	Clay	(Belgium) Kirsten Flipkens	4–6, 6–7^{(3–7)}
Runner-up	2.	1 September 2002	ITF Bielefeld, Germany	Clay	(Germany) Antonela Voina	4–6, 7–5, 4–6
Winner	1.	6 October 2002	ITF Ciampino, Italy	Clay	(Romania) Oana Elena Golimbioschi	6–0, 6–4
Winner	2.	29 June 2003	ITF Alkmaar, Netherlands	Clay	(Netherlands) Lotty Seelen	6–4, 6–4
Runner-up	3.	5 September 2004	ITF Mestre, Italy	Clay	(Morocco) Bahia Mouhtassine	1–6, 0–6
Runner-up	4.	27 September 2004	ITF Porto, Portugal	Clay	(Italy) Nathalie Viérin	6–3, 5–7, 3–6
Winner	3.	19 November 2006	ITF Mallorca, Spain	Clay	(Spain) Eva Fernández Brugués	6–1, 6–3
Winner	4.	8 January 2007	ITF Algiers, Algeria	Clay	(Hungary) Palma Kiraly	7–6^{(7–4)}, 6–1
Winner	5.	19 January 2007	ITF Algiers, Algeria	Clay	(Spain) Marta Marrero	5–7, 6–0, 6–3
Runner-up	5.	18 February 2007	ITF Mallorca, Spain	Clay	(Italy) Elisa Balsamo	1–6, 6–1, 4–6
Runner-up	6.	20 March 2007	ITF Cairo, Egypt	Clay	(Russia) Galina Fokina	2–6, 2–6
Winner	6.	23 April 2007	ITF Naples, Italy	Clay	(France) Stéphanie Vongsouthi	6–2, 6–1
Winner	7.	12 April 2008	ITF Antalya, Turkey	Clay	(Italy) Valentina Sulpizio	7–5, 4–6, 6–4
Winner	8.	19 April 2008	ITF Antalya, Turkey	Clay	(Bulgaria) Elitsa Kostova	6–2, 2–6, 7–6^{(7–3)}
Runner-up	7.	9 May 2008	ITF Antalya, Turkey	Clay	(Belarus) Ksenia Milevskaya	2–6, 2–6
Runner-up	8.	15 June 2008	ITF Lenzerheide, Switzerland	Clay	(Slovakia) Klaudia Boczová	3–6, 1–6
Runner-up	9.	20 July 2008	ITF Darmstadt, Germany	Clay	(Australia) Jelena Dokic	0–6, 0–6
Winner	9.	18 October 2008	ITF Sevilla, Spain	Clay	(Italy) Giulia Gatto-Monticone	6–3, 6–2
Winner	10.	9 November 2008	ITF Mallorca, Spain	Clay	(Ukraine) Kateryna Herth	7–6^{(7–3)}, 6–4
Winner	11.	20 June 2009	ITF Lenzerheide, Switzerland	Clay	(Switzerland) Amra Sadiković	6–2, 7–5
Runner-up	10.	26 July 2009	ITF Horb, Germany	Clay	(Czech Republic) Lucie Kriegsmannová	4–6, 4–6

=== Doubles: 18 (9 titles, 9 runner-ups) ===
Outcome	No.	Date	Tournament	Surface	Partner	Opponents	Score
Runner-up	1.	1 November 1999	ITF Jaffa, Israel	Hard	(Netherlands) Kristie Boogert	(Israel) Tzipora Obziler (Israel) Hila Rosen	4–6, 6–1, 4–6
Winner	1.	24 August 2003	ITF Enschede, Netherlands	Clay	(Netherlands) Jolanda Mens	(Netherlands) Kika Hogendoorn (Romania) Laura-Ramona Husaru	6–3, 7–6^{(7–5)}
Runner-up	2.	29 March 2004	ITF Napoli, Italy	Clay	(Netherlands) Marielle Hoogland	(Belgium) Elke Clijsters (Luxembourg) Mandy Minella	1–6, 0–6
Runner-up	3.	11 April 2004	ITF Torre del Greco, Italy	Clay	(Netherlands) Marielle Hoogland	(Netherlands) Jolanda Mens (South Africa) Chanelle Scheepers	3–6, 0–6
Winner	2.	24 January 2005	ITF Belfort, France	Hard (i)	(Netherlands) Anousjka van Exel	(Austria) Daniela Klemenschits (Austria) Sandra Klemenschits	6–1, 4–2 ret.
Winner	3.	14 February 2005	ITF Bromma, Sweden	Hard (i)	(Netherlands) Anousjka van Exel	(Japan) Ryōko Fuda (Japan) Rika Fujiwara	w/o
Winner	4.	8 January 2007	ITF Algiers, Algeria	Clay	(Netherlands) Talitha de Groot	(Algeria) Assia Halo (Algeria) Samia Medjahdi	1–6, 6–3, 6–2
Runner-up	4.	17 March 2007	ITF Cairo, Egypt	Clay	(United Kingdom) Melissa Berry	(Slovakia) Kristína Kučová (Slovakia) Zuzana Kučová	7–6^{(7–3)}, 4–6, 3–6
Runner-up	5.	11 August 2007	ITF Gdynia, Poland	Clay	(Poland) Monika Krauze	(Poland) Karolina Kosińska (Czech Republic) Veronika Chvojková	1–6, 5–7
Runner-up	6.	12 April 2008	ITF Antalya, Turkey	Clay	(Netherlands) Marcella Koek	(Italy) Elisa Balsamo (Italy) Valentina Sulpizio	2–6, 2–6
Winner	5.	19 April 2008	ITF Antalya, Turkey	Clay	(Netherlands) Marcella Koek	(Italy) Elisa Balsamo (Italy) Valentina Sulpizio	6–3, 6–4
Winner	6.	14 June 2008	ITF Lenzerheide, Switzerland	Clay	(Netherlands) Marlot Meddens	(Italy) Alice Balducci (Switzerland) Lisa Sabino	6–0, 6–3
Runner-up	7.	20 July 2008	ITF Darmstadt, Germany	Clay	(Netherlands) Marcella Koek	(Finland) Emma Laine (Canada) Heidi El Tabakh	3–6, 4–6
Runner-up	8.	5 October 2008	ITF Porto, Portugal	Clay	(Russia) Marina Melnikova	(Czech Republic) Jana Jandová (Czech Republic) Kateřina Vaňková	3–6, 6–4, [6–10]
Winner	7.	17 October 2008	ITF Sevilla, Spain	Clay	(Netherlands) Claire Lablans	(Italy) Giulia Gatto-Monticone (Italy) Federica Quercia	6–2, 6–3
Runner-up	9.	8 November 2008	ITF Mallorca, Spain	Clay	(Russia) Marina Melnikova	(Italy) Benedetta Davato (Italy) Giulia Gasparri	2–6, 4–6
Winner	8.	19 June 2009	ITF Lenzerheide, Switzerland	Clay	(Netherlands) Marcella Koek	(Switzerland) Xenia Knoll (Switzerland) Amra Sadiković	6–3, 6–3
Winner	9.	26 July 2009	ITF Horb, Germany	Clay	(Netherlands) Marcella Koek	(Slovenia) Anja Prislan (Switzerland) Amra Sadiković	7–6^{(8–6)}, 6–1
