= 2007 Fed Cup Asia/Oceania Zone Group I – Pool B =

International tennis competition

Group B of the 2007 Fed Cup Asia/Oceania Zone Group I was one of two pools in the Asia/Oceania Zone Group I of the 2007 Fed Cup. Five teams competed in a round robin competition, with the top team proceeding to their respective sections of the play-offs: the top team played for advancement to the World Group II Play-offs.

		(India) IND	(Chinese Taipei) TPE	(New Zealand) NZL	(Kazakhstan) KAZ	(Jordan) JOR	Match; W–L	Set; W–L	Game; W–L	Standings
19	India		0–3	2–1	3–0	3–0	3–1	16–9	122–80	2
35	Chinese Taipei	3–0		2–1	3–0	3–0	4–0	23–3	149–67	1
38	New Zealand	1–2	1–2		3–0	3–0	2–2	17–9	156–83	3
46	Kazakhstan	0–3	0–3	0–3		3–0	1–3	7–18	57–116	4
	Jordan	0–3	0–3	0–3	0–3		0–4	0–24	6–144	5

== India vs. Kazakhstan ==
India
3
Scenic Circles Hotel Tennis Centre, Christchurch, New Zealand
16 April 2007
Plexipave (outdoors)

Kazakhstan
0

			1	2	3
1	(India) (Kazakhstan)	Shikha Uberoi; Tatyana Ignatchenko	6; 0	6; 0
2	(India) (Kazakhstan)	Sunitha Rao; Mariya Kovaleva	6; 4	6; 2
3	(India) (Kazakhstan)	Ankita Bhambri / Tara Iyer; Mariya Kovaleva / Yekaterina Morozova	6; 1	6; 4

== New Zealand vs. Jordan ==
New Zealand
3
Scenic Circles Hotel Tennis Centre, Christchurch, New Zealand
16 April 2007
Plexipave (outdoors)

Jordan
0

			1	2	3
1	(New Zealand) (Jordan)	Dianne Hollands; Sahar Al Disi	6; 0	6; 0
2	(New Zealand) (Jordan)	Leanne Baker; Leen Irani	6; 0	6; 0
3	(New Zealand) (Jordan)	Leanne Baker / Shona Lee; Sahar Al Disi / Leen Irani	6; 0	6; 0

== India vs. Jordan ==
India
3
Scenic Circles Hotel Tennis Centre, Christchurch, New Zealand
17 April 2007
Plexipave (outdoors)

Jordan
0

			1	2	3
1	(India) (Jordan)	Tara Iyer; Sahar Al Disi	6; 0	6; 0
2	(India) (Jordan)	Ankita Bhambri; Leen Irani	6; 0	6; 0
3	(India) (Jordan)	Sunitha Rao / Shikha Uberoi; Sahar Al Disi / Leen Irani	6; 1	6; 0

== Chinese Taipei vs. Kazakhstan ==
Chinese Taipei
3
Scenic Circles Hotel Tennis Centre, Christchurch, New Zealand
17 April 2007
Plexipave (outdoors)

Kazakhstan
0

			1	2	3
1	(Chinese Taipei) (Kazakhstan)	Chan Chin-wei; Tatyana Ignatchenko	6; 2	6; 1
2	(Chinese Taipei) (Kazakhstan)	Hsieh Su-wei; Yekaterina Morozova	3; 6	6; 3	6; 0
3	(Chinese Taipei) (Kazakhstan)	Hsieh Su-wei / Hsu Wen-hsin; Mariya Kovaleva / Yekaterina Morozova	7; 5	6; 2

== India vs. New Zealand ==
India
3
Scenic Circles Hotel Tennis Centre, Christchurch, New Zealand
18 April 2007
Plexipave (outdoors)

New Zealand
0

			1	2	3
1	(India) (New Zealand)	Shikha Uberoi; Sacha Jones	6^{5} 7^{7}	3; 6
2	(India) (New Zealand)	Sunitha Rao; Leanne Baker	6; 4	6; 2
3	(India) (New Zealand)	Sunitha Rao / Shikha Uberoi; Leanne Baker / Dianne Hollands	2; 6	7^{7} 6^{1}	6; 1

== Chinese Taipei vs. Jordan ==
Chinese Taipei
3
Scenic Circles Hotel Tennis Centre, Christchurch, New Zealand
18 April 2007
Plexipave (outdoors)

Jordan
0

			1	2	3
1	(Chinese Taipei) (Jordan)	Hsu Wen-hsin; Sahar Al Disi	6; 1	6; 0
2	(Chinese Taipei) (Jordan)	Hsieh Su-wei; Leen Irani	6; 0	6; 0
3	(Chinese Taipei) (Jordan)	Hsu Wen-hsin / Hwang I-hsuan; Sahar Al Disi / Leen Irani	6; 0	6; 0

== Chinese Taipei vs. New Zealand ==
Chinese Taipei
2
Scenic Circles Hotel Tennis Centre, Christchurch, New Zealand
19 April 2007
Plexipave (outdoors)

New Zealand
1

			1	2	3
1	(Chinese Taipei) (New Zealand)	Chan Chin-wei; Sacha Jones	6; 4	6; 4
2	(Chinese Taipei) (New Zealand)	Hsieh Su-wei; Leanne Baker	6; 4	6; 4
3	(Chinese Taipei) (New Zealand)	Hsu Wen-hsin / Hwang I-hsuan; Leanne Baker / Dianne Hollands	6; 4	6^{5} 7^{7}	1; 6

== Kazakhstan vs. Jordan ==
Kazakhstan
3
Scenic Circles Hotel Tennis Centre, Christchurch, New Zealand
19 April 2007
Plexipave (outdoors)

Jordan
0

			1	2	3
1	(Kazakhstan) (Jordan)	Tatyana Ignatchenko; Sahar Al Disi	6; 1	6; 1
2	(Kazakhstan) (Jordan)	Yekaterina Morozova; Leen Irani	6; 2	6; 0
3	(Kazakhstan) (Jordan)	Tatyana Ignatchenko / Yekaterina Morozova; Sahar Al Disi / Leen Irani	6; 0	6; 0

== India vs. Chinese Taipei ==
India
3
Scenic Circles Hotel Tennis Centre, Christchurch, New Zealand
20 April 2007
Plexipave (outdoors)

Chinese Taipei
0

			1	2	3
1	(India) (Chinese Taipei)	Shikha Uberoi; Chan Chin-wei	3; 6	2; 6
2	(India) (Chinese Taipei)	Sunitha Rao; Hsieh Su-wei	3; 6	2; 6
3	(India) (Chinese Taipei)	Ankita Bhambri / Tara Iyer; Hsu Wen-hsin / Hwang I-hsuan	4; 6	0; 6

== New Zealand vs. Kazakhstan ==
New Zealand
3
Scenic Circles Hotel Tennis Centre, Christchurch, New Zealand
20 April 2007
Plexipave (outdoors)

Kazakhstan
0

			1	2	3
1	(New Zealand) (Kazakhstan)	Sacha Jones; Tatyana Ignatchenko	6; 3	6; 0
2	(New Zealand) (Kazakhstan)	Leanne Baker; Yekaterina Morozova	6; 1	6; 1
3	(New Zealand) (Kazakhstan)	Dianne Hollands / Shona Lee; Tatyana Ignatchenko / Yekaterina Morozova	6; 4	6; 1

== See also ==
- Fed Cup structure
