= Matilde Muñoz Gonzalves =

Spanish tennis player (born 1985)

- Country (sports): Spain
- Residence: Valencia
- Born: 3 September 1985 (age 40); Valencia, Spain
- Turned pro: 2003
- Retired: 2008
- Plays: Left-handed (two-handed backhand)
- Prize money: $34,452

Singles
- Career record: 116–95
- Career titles: 2 ITF
- Highest ranking: No. 272 (21 August 2006)

Doubles
- Career record: 12–31
- Highest ranking: No. 416 (7 August 2006)

Matilde Muñoz Gonzalves (born 3 September 1985) is a former Spanish tennis player.

On 21 August 2006, she reached her career-high singles ranking of world No. 272. On 7 August 2006, she peaked at No. 416 in the doubles rankings. She has won two singles titles on the ITF Women's Circuit.

== Career ==
In February 2005, she first professional singles final at the $10k event in Mallorca she lost austrian Tina Schiechtl in the final.

In September 2005 she won her first professional singles title at the $25k event in Madrid beating Czech Olga Vymetálková in the final.

In April 2008, Muñoz Gonzalves won her second singles title in Torrent. She retired from tennis at the end of 2008.

== ITF finals ==
=== Singles: 3 (2–1) ===
$100,000 tournaments
$75,000 tournaments
$50,000 tournaments
$25,000 tournaments
$10,000 tournaments

Outcome	No.	Date	Tournament	Surface	Opponent	Score
Runner-up	1.	13 February 2005	Mallorca, Spain	Clay	(Austria) Tina Schiechtl	3–6, 1–6
Winner	1.	11 September 2005	Madrid, Spain	Hard	(Czech Republic) Olga Vymetálková	6–3, 6–2
Winner	2.	27 April 2008	Torrent, Spain	Clay	(Spain) Maite Gabarrús-Alonso	6–3, 6–2

=== Doubles: 2 (0–2) ===
Outcome	No.	Date	Tournament	Surface	Partner	Opponents	Score
Runner-up	1.	7 August 2005	Vigo, Spain	Hard	(Spain) Estrella Cabeza Candela	(Spain) Anna Font (Spain) María José Martínez Sánchez	2–6, 3–6
Runner-up	2.	18 June 2006	Gorizia, Italy	Clay	(Spain) Sílvia Soler Espinosa	(Argentina) Soledad Esperón (South Africa) Chanelle Scheepers	4–6, 3–6
