= Sanda Mamić =

Croatian tennis player (born 1985)

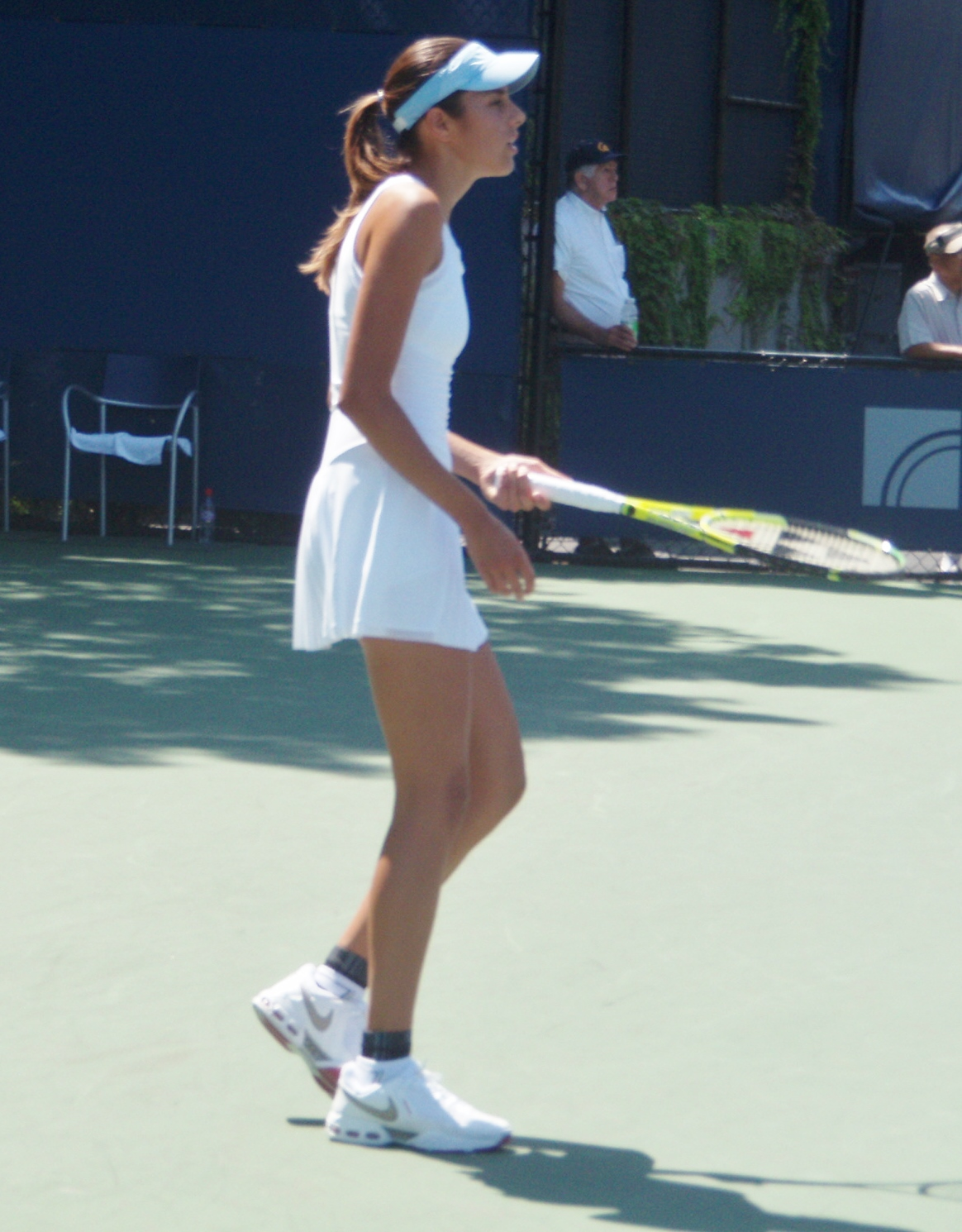
- Country (sports): Croatia
- Residence: Zagreb, Croatia
- Born: 22 March 1985 (age 39); Zagreb, SFR Yugoslavia
- Height: 1.79 m (5 ft 10 in)
- Turned pro: 2004
- Retired: 2014
- Plays: Left-handed (two-handed backhand)
- Prize money: $237,432

Singles
- Career record: 145–104
- Career titles: 3 ITF
- Highest ranking: No. 83 (18 July 2005)

Grand Slam singles results
- Australian Open: 1R (2005)
- French Open: 2R (2005, 2008)
- Wimbledon: 1R (2005)
- US Open: 1R (2005)

Doubles
- Career record: 21–24
- Career titles: 1 ITF
- Highest ranking: No. 298 (16 February 2004)

Grand Slam doubles results
- Wimbledon: 1R (2005)
- US Open: 1R (2005 )

Team competitions
- Fed Cup: 2–5

Sanda Mamić (born 22 March 1985) is a retired female tennis player and current full-time gaming streamer on Twitch from Croatia.

== Early career ==
- 2001 – reached final at ITF Hvar/CRO
- 2002 – reached final at ITF Sopron/HUN
- 2003 – won first ITF Circuit title at ITF Yamaguchi/JPN; also reached final at ITF Makarska/CRO
- 2004 – best career finish, reaching quarterfinals at Budapest. Mamić, ranked world No. 201, entered the main draw as a qualifier. Budapest was her WTA Tour main-draw debut, whereupon she defeated Gala León García and Tathiana Garbin en route, eventually losing to Flavia Pennetta in three sets.

In Seoul, she qualified and lost again, in the quarterfinals to Anne Kremer.

After qualifying at Moscow, Mamić notched her best win versus world No. 28, Mary Pierce, winning 6–0, 6–4 before losing to Elena Dementieva.

In May 2004, Mamić had her Grand Slam debut, reaching the main draw at the French Open through qualifying. She would lose in the first round.

Later in the year, she had her top-100 debut on 18 October at world No. 96, reaching career-high at the time to world No. 95 a week later.

In 2005, Mamić reached third singles quarterfinal at Modena, losing in a third-set tiebreaker to eventual finalist Garbin.

She managed to reach the second round four times, including Rome, where she defeated world No. 23, Daniela Hantuchová, and later losing to Pierce, and the French Open, where she eventually lost in the second round to Dementieva.

During the rest of the year, she lost in the first round six times, including the other three Grand Slam tournaments.

In September, she was invited to Croatian Fed Cup team for their match against Thailand. Although she lost both singles rubbers to Tamarine Tanasugarn and Suchanan Viratprasert, Croatia prevailed 3–2.

== Late career ==
Later in her career, Mamić had problems with her wrist, which at first was thought to be a regular sport injury requiring only a short term break. Her ranking was protected for the next ten months. But further complications with her injury, talk about a mysterious bacteria that infected her wrist wound, and liver complications took her off the courts for more than two years. Her tennis career seemed almost over, and she moved on and started to work for a web design company.

But in 2008, she came back to the courts. Her comeback began at the Bangalore Open in March where she won her first-round match against Chan Yung-jan (6–2, 6–2), but lost in the second round to then-No. 1 in the world, Jelena Janković (2–6, 2–6). Mamić reached the second round in her Grand Slam comeback at the French Open, beating Michaëlla Krajicek (6–4, 6–3) before falling to Francesca Schiavone.

== ITF Circuit finals ==
$100,000 tournaments
$75,000 tournaments
$50,000 tournaments
$25,000 tournaments
$10,000 tournaments

=== Singles: 6 (3 titles, 3 runner-ups) ===
Outcome	No.	Date	Tournament	Surface	Opponent	Score
Runner-up	1.	16 April 2001	ITF Hvar, Croatia	Clay	(Czech Republic) Petra Cetkovská	3–6, 1–6
Winner	2.	2 September 2002	ITF Chieti, Italy	Clay	(Italy) Emily Stellato	6–3, 6–0
Runner-up	3.	23 September 2002	ITF Sopron, Hungary	Clay	(Austria) Tina Schiechtl	6–7, 5–7
Runner-up	4.	10 March 2003	ITF Makarska, Croatia	Clay	(Romania) Delia Sescioreanu	4–6, 2–6
Winner	5.	14 April 2003	ITF Yamaguchi, Japan	Clay	(Japan) Ryoko Takemura	6–2, 6–2
Winner	6.	12 July 2004	ITF Garching, Germany	Clay	(Russia) Maria Kondratieva	6–3, 1–6, 6–2

=== Doubles: 3 (1 title, 2 runner-ups) ===
Outcome	No.	Date	Tournament	Surface	Partner	Opponents	Score
Runner-up	1.	6 May 2002	ITF Zaton, Croatia	Clay	(Slovenia) Tina Hergold	(Austria) Daniela Klemenschits (Austria) Sandra Klemenschits	4–6, 4–6
Winner	2.	7 July 2003	ITF Darmstadt, Germany	Clay	(Croatia) Ana Vrljić	(Serbia and Montenegro) Daniela Berček (Russia) Maria Goloviznina	7–6^{(9–7)}, 6–1
Runner-up	3.	25 January 2004	ITF Bergamo, Italy	Carpet (i)	(Croatia) Iva Majoli	(Italy) Alberta Brianti (France) Kildine Chevalier	4–6, 4–6

== Grand Slam singles performance timeline ==
Key
W	F	SF	QF	#R	RR	Q#	DNQ	A	NH

(W) winner; (F) finalist; (SF) semifinalist; (QF) quarterfinalist; (#R) rounds 4, 3, 2, 1; (RR) round-robin stage; (Q#) qualification round; (DNQ) did not qualify; (A) absent; (NH) not held; (SR) strike rate (events won / competed); (W–L) win–loss record.

Tournament	2004	2005	Career SR	Career W–L
Australian Open	A	1R	0 / 1	0–1
French Open	1R	2R	0 / 2	1–2
Wimbledon	A	1R	0 / 1	0–1
US Open	A	1R	0 / 1	0–1

== Current career ==
Sanda is currently a content creator and full-time gaming streamer on Twitch under the name Sansen (sansensworld) playing PUBG, League of Legends, Dead by Daylight, World of Warcraft, etc.

She had a lot of notable gaming results: PUBG Broadcaster Royale S2 (Q1 – #10, Q2 – #4, LAN finals San Jose – #21 duo); qualified as the only female player from Europe 1st LAN female PUBG tournament, Shanghai CHINA (#4 duo) PUBG challengermode (#1 solo) PUBG Girl Gamer Royale S1 (#5 duo) PUBG Twitch Rivals (charity & regular)

She promotes PLUR (Peace Love Unity Respect) ideology and is known for providing the FEEL GOOD content across media platforms.
