= Tina Schiechtl =

Austrian tennis player

- Country (sports): Austria
- Residence: Vienna, Austria
- Born: 15 January 1984 (age 41); Kitzbühel, Austria
- Height: 1.70 m (5 ft 7 in)
- Turned pro: 2000
- Plays: Right-handed (two-handed backhand)
- Prize money: $145,075

Singles
- Career record: 351–305
- Career titles: 9 ITF
- Highest ranking: No. 230 (25 September 2006)

Grand Slam singles results
- US Open: Q1 (2006)

Doubles
- Career record: 10–17
- Career titles: 0
- Highest ranking: No. 1033 (9 December 2013)

Tina Schiechtl (born 15 January 1984) is an Austrian former professional tennis player.

On 25 September 2006, she reached her highest WTA singles ranking of 230. On 9 December 2013, she peaked at No. 1033 in the doubles rankings. In her career, Schiechtl won nine singles titles on the ITF Circuit.

Her last match on the pro circuit took place in April 2014.

== ITF Circuit finals ==
=== Singles: 18 (9 titles, 9 runner-ups) ===
$100,000 tournaments
$75,000 tournaments
$50,000 tournaments
$25,000 tournaments
$10,000 tournaments

Result	No.	Date	Tournament	Surface	Opponent	Score
Loss	1.	29 July 2001	ITF Casablanca, Morocco	Clay	(France) Delphine De Winne	6–2, 5–7, 2–6
Win	2.	29 April 2002	ITF Dubrovnik, Croatia	Clay	(Ukraine) Mariya Koryttseva	4–6, 6–4, 6–3
Win	3.	23 September 2002	ITF Sopron, Hungary	Clay	(Croatia) Sanda Mamić	7–6^{(7–3)}, 7–5
Loss	4.	15 April 2003	ITF Jackson, United States	Clay	(China) Peng Shuai	2–6, 4–6
Loss	5.	3 August 2003	ITF Saulgau, Germany	Clay	(Serbia) Ana Timotić	6–4, 2–6, 5–7
Win	6.	8 February 2005	ITF Mallorca, Spain	Clay	(Spain) Matilde Munoz Gonzalves	6–3, 6–1
Loss	7.	7 March 2005	ITF Las Palmas, Spain	Clay	(Switzerland) Romina Oprandi	3–6, 2–6
Win	8.	26 September 2005	ITF Porto, Portugal	Clay	(Spain) Lourdes Domínguez Lino	7–6, 7–6
Win	9.	7 February 2006	ITF Mallorca, Spain	Clay	(Italy) Anna Floris	6–3, 2–6, 6–4
Loss	10.	28 May 2007	ITF Galatina, Italy	Clay	(Italy) Sara Errani	1–6, 4–6
Win	11.	9 February 2009	ITF Mallorca, Spain	Clay	(France) Laura Thorpe	5–7, 6–4, 7–5
Win	12.	22 March 2010	ITF Cairo, Egypt	Clay	(Spain) Lucia Cervera-Vazquez	7–5, 7–5
Loss	13.	29 March 2010	ITF Cairo, Egypt	Clay	(South Africa) Chanel Simmonds	6–2, 3–6, 5–7
Win	14.	26 July 2010	ITF Jakarta, Indonesia	Hard	(Indonesia) Lavinia Tananta	6–3, 6–4
Loss	15.	30 August 2010	ITF Bassano del Grappa, Italy	Clay	(Italy) Paola Cigui	4–6, 1–6
Loss	16.	4 April 2011	ITF Córdoba, Argentina	Clay	(Argentina) Tatiana Búa	6–4, 3–6, 2–6
Loss	17.	12 November 2011	ITF Asunción, Paraguay	Clay	(Slovakia) Romana Tabak	7–6, 4–6, 4–6
Win	18.	21 November 2011	ITF Rancagua, Chile	Clay	(South Africa) Natasha Fourouclas	3–6, 6–3, 6–0

=== Doubles: 1 (runner-up) ===
$100,000 tournaments
$75,000 tournaments
$50,000 tournaments
$25,000 tournaments
$10,000 tournaments

Result	No.	Date	Tournament	Surface	Partner	Opponents	Score
Loss	1.	8 February 2005	ITF Mallorca, Spain	Clay	(Poland) Olga Brózda	(Spain) Adriana Gonzalez-Peñas (Switzerland) Romina Oprandi	3–6, 5–7
