= Palma Kiraly =

Hungarian tennis player

- Country (sports): Hungary
- Born: 2 February 1991 (age 34)
- Turned pro: 2006
- Retired: 2010
- Plays: Right-handed

Palma Kiraly (born 2 February 1991) is a former professional tennis player from the Hungary. On 3 March 2009, she reached her highest WTA singles ranking of 399.

== Tennis career ==
She has won 2 singles titles on the ITF Women's Circuit. In 2008, Kiraly won her first singles title in Budva defeating Croatianwoman Tereza Mrdeža. Her only WTA Tour main draw appearance came at the Budapest Grand Prix, but lost to Anna-Lena Grönefeld in the first round.
