= 2007 Sunfeast Open – Doubles =

Doubles
- 2007 Sunfeast Open

Final
- Champions: (United States) Vania King (Russia) Alla Kudryavtseva
- Runners-up: (Italy) Alberta Brianti (Ukraine) Mariya Koryttseva
- Score: 6–1, 6–4

Events
Singles	Doubles
← 2006 ·	Sunfeast Open

Liezel Huber and Sania Mirza were the defending champions, but Huber chose not to participate that year and Mirza withdrew due to a right wrist sprain.

Vania King and Alla Kudryavtseva defeated Alberta Brianti and Mariya Koryttseva 6–1, 6–4 in the final to win their title.

== Seeds ==
1. (United States) Vania King / (Russia) Alla Kudryavtseva (champions)
2. (Belarus) Tatiana Poutchek / (Russia) Anastasia Rodionova (Quarter finals)
3. (Slovakia) Jarmila Gajdošová / (Romania) Edina Gallovits (withdrew due to left thigh strain Gallovits)
4. (Italy) Sara Errani / (Italy) Flavia Pennetta (quarterfinals)

== Draw ==
=== Key ===
- Q = Qualifier
- WC = Wild card
- LL = Lucky loser
- Alt = Alternate
- SE = Special exempt
- PR = Protected ranking
- ITF = ITF entry
- JE = Junior exempt
- w/o = Walkover
- r = Retired
- d = Defaulted
- SR = Special ranking

First round
1	(United States) V King (Russia) A Kudryavtseva	6	6
(India) A Bhambri (India) R Chakravarthi	1	1
(India) T Iyer (Canada) A Wozniak	6	7
(Russia) J Efremova (Russia) E Ivanova	4	5
Alt	(Indonesia) S Gumulya (United States) W Jones	6	6
(United Kingdom) A Keothavong (Czech Republic) H Šromová	3	3
(Turkey) İ Şenoğlu (Russia) Y Shvedova	7^{8}	6
(United States) C Nagle (United States) R Stephenson	6^{6}	1
(Poland) M Domachowska (India) N Uberoi	1	4
(Australia) M Adamczak (United States) S Rao	6	6
(India) S Bhambri (India) I Lakhani	2	0
4	(Italy) S Errani (Italy) F Pennetta	6	6
WC	(India) A Shrivastava (India) K Shroff	1	1
(Italy) A Brianti (Ukraine) M Koryttseva	6	6
(Uzbekistan) A Amanmuradova (Australia) C Dellacqua	4	0
2	(Belarus) T Poutchek (Russia) A Rodionova	6	6

Quarterfinals
1	(United States) V King (Russia) A Kudryavtseva	6	5	[10]
(India) T Iyer (Canada) A Wozniak	1	7	[4]
Alt	(Indonesia) S Gumulya (United States) W Jones	2	6^{3}
(Turkey) İ Şenoğlu (Russia) Y Shvedova	6	7^{7}
(Australia) M Adamczak (United States) S Rao	w/o
4	(Italy) S Errani (Italy) F Pennetta
(Italy) A Brianti (Ukraine) M Koryttseva	2	6	[10]
2	(Belarus) T Poutchek (Russia) A Rodionova	6	3	[6]

Semifinals
1	(United States) V King (Russia) A Kudryavtseva	6	6
(Turkey) I Senoglu (Russia) Y Shvedova	0	4
(Australia) M Adamczak (United States) S Rao	2	7	[5]
(Italy) A Brianti (Ukraine) M Koryttseva	6	5	[10]

Finals
1	(United States) V King (Russia) A Kudryavtseva	6	6
(Italy) A Brianti (Ukraine) M Koryttseva	1	4
