= 2008 ITF Women's Circuit (January–March) =

The ITF Women's Circuit is the second-tier tour for women's professional tennis organised by the International Tennis Federation, and is a tier below the WTA Tour. The ITF Women's Circuit includes tournaments with prize money ranging from $10,000 up to $100,000.

This article covers the ITF tour from the months of January until March.

== Schedule ==
=== Key ===
$100,000 tournaments
$75,000 tournaments
$50,000 tournaments
$25,000 tournaments
$10,000 tournaments

=== January ===
Week	Tournament	Winner	Runner-up	Semi finalists	Quarter finalists	Refs
January 7, 2008	(United States) St. Leo, Tampa Bay, Florida; Hard $25,000	(Russia) Anastasia Pivovarova; 6–4, 6–0	(United States) Audra Cohen	(Italy) Corinna Dentoni (Slovenia) Petra Rampre	(United States) Alexis Gordon (Argentina) Betina Jozami (United States) Kimberly Couts (Argentina) Soledad Esperón	
January 7, 2008	(United States) St. Leo, Tampa Bay, Florida; Hard $25,000	(Argentina) Soledad Esperón (Portugal) Frederica Piedade; 6–2 6–7^{(2)} [10–7]	(Italy) Corinna Dentoni (Russia) Anastasia Pivovarova	(Italy) Corinna Dentoni (Slovenia) Petra Rampre	(United States) Alexis Gordon (Argentina) Betina Jozami (United States) Kimberly Couts (Argentina) Soledad Esperón	
January 14, 2008	Stuttgart, Germany; Indoor Hard $10,000	(Netherlands) Renée Reinhard; 2–6 6–4 6–4	(Switzerland) Nicole Riner	(Czech Republic) Tereza Hladíková (Germany) Laura Haberkorn	(France) Claire De Gubernatis (Slovenia) Diana Nakič (Croatia) Darija Jurak (Bosnia and Herzegovina) Sandra Martinović	
January 14, 2008	Stuttgart, Germany; Indoor Hard $10,000	(Russia) Vasilisa Davydova (Russia) Elizaveta Tochilovskaya; 6–2 7–5	(Ukraine) Kateryna Avdiyenko (Russia) Nina Bratchikova	(Czech Republic) Tereza Hladíková (Germany) Laura Haberkorn	(France) Claire De Gubernatis (Slovenia) Diana Nakič (Croatia) Darija Jurak (Bosnia and Herzegovina) Sandra Martinović	
January 14, 2008	Sunderland, United Kingdom; Indoor Hard $10,000	(Russia) Yelena Kulikova; 6–2 7–6^{(6)}	(Sweden) Johanna Larsson	(Sweden) Nadja Roma (United Kingdom) Naomi Broady	(Czech Republic) Iveta Gerlová (France) Stephanie Vongsouthi (France) Estelle Guisard (United Kingdom) Anna Smith	
January 14, 2008	Sunderland, United Kingdom; Indoor Hard $10,000	(Sweden) Johanna Larsson (United Kingdom) Anna Smith; 6–1 3–6 [10–3]	(Slovakia) Martina Babáková (Czech Republic) Iveta Gerlová	(Sweden) Nadja Roma (United Kingdom) Naomi Broady	(Czech Republic) Iveta Gerlová (France) Stephanie Vongsouthi (France) Estelle Guisard (United Kingdom) Anna Smith	
January 14, 2008	(United States) Surprise, Arizona, USA; Hard $25,000	(Bulgaria) Sesil Karatantcheva; 6–2 4–6 6–4	(United States) Angela Haynes	(Ukraine) Viktoriya Kutuzova (Russia) Anastasia Pivovarova	(Germany) Kathrin Wörle (Slovakia) Magdaléna Rybáriková (United States) Amber Liu (United States) Allie Will	
January 14, 2008	(United States) Surprise, Arizona, USA; Hard $25,000	(United States) Carly Gullickson (United States) Shenay Perry; 6–4 7–5	(Brazil) Maria Fernanda Alves (Argentina) Betina Jozami	(Ukraine) Viktoriya Kutuzova (Russia) Anastasia Pivovarova	(Germany) Kathrin Wörle (Slovakia) Magdaléna Rybáriková (United States) Amber Liu (United States) Allie Will	
January 21, 2008	Wrexham, United Kingdom; Indoor Hard $10,000	(Russia) Yelena Kulikova; 6–4 6–0	(Italy) Anna Floris	(Czech Republic) Jana Jandová (Slovenia) Tadeja Majerič	(Czech Republic) Iveta Gerlová (United Kingdom) Olivia Scarfi (Spain) Irene Rehberger Bescos (United Kingdom) Amanda Elliott	
January 21, 2008	Wrexham, United Kingdom; Indoor Hard $10,000	(Slovakia) Martina Babáková (Czech Republic) Iveta Gerlová; 3–6 6–3 [11–9]	(New Zealand) Dianne Hollands (Russia) Yelena Kulikova	(Czech Republic) Jana Jandová (Slovenia) Tadeja Majerič	(Czech Republic) Iveta Gerlová (United Kingdom) Olivia Scarfi (Spain) Irene Rehberger Bescos (United Kingdom) Amanda Elliott	
January 21, 2008	Grenoble, France; Indoor Hard $10,000	(France) Claire Feuerstein; 6–3 4–6 6–4	(France) Anne-Laure Heitz	(Switzerland) Nicole Riner (Belgium) Debbrich Feys	(France) Shérazad Benamar (France) Constance Sibille (Switzerland) Conny Perrin (Italy) Evelyn Mayr	
January 21, 2008	Grenoble, France; Indoor Hard $10,000	(Russia) Vasilisa Davydova (Latvia) Irina Kuzmina; 6–0 7–5	(Czech Republic) Barbora Krtičková (Czech Republic) Lucie Šípková	(Switzerland) Nicole Riner (Belgium) Debbrich Feys	(France) Shérazad Benamar (France) Constance Sibille (Switzerland) Conny Perrin (Italy) Evelyn Mayr	
January 21, 2008	Kaarst, Germany; Indoor Hard $10,000	(Portugal) Neuza Silva; 6–3 6–1	(Netherlands) Renée Reinhard	(Czech Republic) Darina Šeděnková (Russia) Nina Bratchikova	(Slovakia) Monika Kochanová (Russia) Anastasia Poltoratskaya (Germany) Franziska Etzel (Russia) Marina Melnikova	
January 21, 2008	Kaarst, Germany; Indoor Hard $10,000	(Netherlands) Chayenne Ewijk (Netherlands) Daniëlle Harmsen; 6–4 6–1	(Serbia) Neda Kozić (Russia) Anastasia Poltoratskaya	(Czech Republic) Darina Šeděnková (Russia) Nina Bratchikova	(Slovakia) Monika Kochanová (Russia) Anastasia Poltoratskaya (Germany) Franziska Etzel (Russia) Marina Melnikova	
January 21, 2008	(United States) Waikoloa, Hawaii, USA; Hard $50,000	(Japan) Rika Fujiwara; 3–6 6–3 6–2	(Germany) Sandra Klösel	(Italy) Corinna Dentoni (Slovakia) Magdaléna Rybáriková	(United States) Julie Ditty (United States) Amber Liu (Canada) Stéphanie Dubois (United States) Lilia Osterloh	
January 21, 2008	(United States) Waikoloa, Hawaii, USA; Hard $50,000	(Brazil) Maria Fernanda Alves (Argentina) Betina Jozami; 7–5 6–4	(United States) Angela Haynes (United States) Mashona Washington	(Italy) Corinna Dentoni (Slovakia) Magdaléna Rybáriková	(United States) Julie Ditty (United States) Amber Liu (Canada) Stéphanie Dubois (United States) Lilia Osterloh	
January 28, 2008	(United States) La Quinta, California, USA; Hard $25,000	(Bulgaria) Sesil Karatantcheva; 6–4 7–5	(Germany) Sandra Klösel	(Ukraine) Viktoriya Kutuzova (Germany) Kathrin Wörle	(France) Irena Pavlovic (Italy) Antonella Serra-Zanetti (United States) Carly Gullickson (Uzbekistan) Varvara Lepchenko	
January 28, 2008	(United States) La Quinta, California, USA; Hard $25,000	(United States) Carly Gullickson (United States) Shenay Perry; 6–1 6–4	(Germany) Angelika Bachmann (Ukraine) Tetiana Luzhanska	(Ukraine) Viktoriya Kutuzova (Germany) Kathrin Wörle	(France) Irena Pavlovic (Italy) Antonella Serra-Zanetti (United States) Carly Gullickson (Uzbekistan) Varvara Lepchenko	
January 28, 2008	Belfort, France; Indoor Carpet $25,000	(France) Julie Coin; 6–0 6–3	(France) Virginie Pichet	(Czech Republic) Andrea Hlaváčková (Spain) María José Martínez Sánchez	(France) Youlia Fedossova (Czech Republic) Sandra Záhlavová (Ukraine) Oxana Lyubtsova (Czech Republic) Lucie Hradecká	
January 28, 2008	Belfort, France; Indoor Carpet $25,000	(Czech Republic) Andrea Hlaváčková (Czech Republic) Lucie Hradecká; 7–6^{(8)} 6–4	(Spain) Marta Marrero (Spain) María José Martínez Sánchez	(Czech Republic) Andrea Hlaváčková (Spain) María José Martínez Sánchez	(France) Youlia Fedossova (Czech Republic) Sandra Záhlavová (Ukraine) Oxana Lyubtsova (Czech Republic) Lucie Hradecká	

=== February ===
Week	Tournament	Winner	Runner-up	Semi finalists	Quarter finalists	Refs
February 4, 2008	Mallorca, Spain; Clay $10,000	(Slovenia) Polona Hercog; 6–3, 6–1	(Spain) Inés Ferrer Suárez	(Spain) Rebeca Bou Nogueiro (France) Laura Thorpe	(Liechtenstein) Stephanie Vogt (Italy) Lisa Sabino (Hungary) Virág Németh (Romania) Andreea Văideanu	
February 4, 2008	Mallorca, Spain; Clay $10,000	(Italy) Lisa Sabino (Italy) Valentina Sulpizio; 7–6^{(8)} 6–4	(Spain) Leticia Costas Moreira (Spain) Maite Gabarrús-Alonso	(Spain) Rebeca Bou Nogueiro (France) Laura Thorpe	(Liechtenstein) Stephanie Vogt (Italy) Lisa Sabino (Hungary) Virág Németh (Romania) Andreea Văideanu	
February 4, 2008	Vale do Lobo, Portugal; Hard $10,000	(Slovakia) Dominika Nociarová; 6–2, 6–0	(Russia) Elena Chalova	(Spain) Beatriz García Vidagany (Portugal) Neuza Silva	(Bulgaria) Tanya Raykova (Russia) Vasilisa Davydova (France) Nadege Vergos (Netherlands) Daniëlle Harmsen	
February 4, 2008	Vale do Lobo, Portugal; Hard $10,000	(Ukraine) Kateryna Avdiyenko (Russia) Nina Bratchikova; 6–4 6–3	(Netherlands) Daniëlle Harmsen (Portugal) Neuza Silva	(Spain) Beatriz García Vidagany (Portugal) Neuza Silva	(Bulgaria) Tanya Raykova (Russia) Vasilisa Davydova (France) Nadege Vergos (Netherlands) Daniëlle Harmsen	
February 4, 2008	Cali, Colombia; Clay $25,000	(France) Mathilde Johansson; 3–6, 6–0, 6–1	(Canada) Ekaterina Shulaeva	(Canada) Marie-Ève Pelletier (Argentina) Veronica Spiegel	(Belarus) Ksenia Milevskaya (Brazil) Teliana Pereira (Austria) Melanie Klaffner (Germany) Martina Müller	
February 4, 2008	Cali, Colombia; Clay $25,000	(Argentina) Mailen Auroux (Uruguay) Estefanía Craciún; 6–1 6–4	(Austria) Melanie Klaffner (Belarus) Ksenia Milevskaya	(Canada) Marie-Ève Pelletier (Argentina) Veronica Spiegel	(Belarus) Ksenia Milevskaya (Brazil) Teliana Pereira (Austria) Melanie Klaffner (Germany) Martina Müller	
February 4, 2008	Sutton, United Kingdom; Hard $25,000	(Sweden) Johanna Larsson; 7–5, 6–0	(Czech Republic) Andrea Hlaváčková	(Russia) Anastasia Poltoratskaya (United Kingdom) Amanda Elliott	(Croatia) Ana Savić (France) Youlia Fedossova (France) Irena Pavlovic (Czech Republic) Lucie Hradecká	
February 4, 2008	Sutton, United Kingdom; Hard $25,000	(Czech Republic) Andrea Hlaváčková (Czech Republic) Lucie Hradecká; 6–3 6–3	(Sweden) Johanna Larsson (United Kingdom) Anna Smith	(Russia) Anastasia Poltoratskaya (United Kingdom) Amanda Elliott	(Croatia) Ana Savić (France) Youlia Fedossova (France) Irena Pavlovic (Czech Republic) Lucie Hradecká	
February 4, 2008	Mildura, Australia; Grass $25,000	(New Zealand) Marina Erakovic; 6–3, 6–1	(Chinese Taipei) Kai-Chen Chang	(Australia) Monique Adamczak (Japan) Natsumi Hamamura	(Australia) Nicole Kriz (Australia) Christina Wheeler (Australia) Emelyn Starr (Mauritius) Marinne Giraud	
February 4, 2008	Mildura, Australia; Grass $25,000	(New Zealand) Marina Erakovic (Australia) Nicole Kriz; 6–4 6–4	(Australia) Monique Adamczak (Australia) Christina Wheeler	(Australia) Monique Adamczak (Japan) Natsumi Hamamura	(Australia) Nicole Kriz (Australia) Christina Wheeler (Australia) Emelyn Starr (Mauritius) Marinne Giraud	
February 4, 2008	(United States) Midland, Michigan, USA; Hard $75,000	(United States) Laura Granville; 6–1, 6–1	(United States) Ashley Harkleroad	(Germany) Sandra Klösel (United Kingdom) Melanie South	(United Kingdom) Katie O'Brien (United States) Varvara Lepchenko (Canada) Sharon Fichman (Germany) Kathrin Wörle	
February 4, 2008	(United States) Midland, Michigan, USA; Hard $75,000	(United States) Ashley Harkleroad (United States) Shenay Perry; 3–6 6–4 [10–6]	(South Africa) Surina De Beer (Japan) Rika Fujiwara	(Germany) Sandra Klösel (United Kingdom) Melanie South	(United Kingdom) Katie O'Brien (United States) Varvara Lepchenko (Canada) Sharon Fichman (Germany) Kathrin Wörle	
February 11, 2008	Mallorca, Spain; Clay $10,000	(Slovenia) Polona Hercog; 4–6 6–1 6–3	(Liechtenstein) Stephanie Vogt	(Spain) Maite Gabarrús-Alonso (Spain) Rebeca Bou Nogueiro	(Italy) Lisa Sabino (Italy) Valentina Sulpizio (France) Laura Thorpe (Spain) Irene Rehberger Bescos	
February 11, 2008	Mallorca, Spain; Clay $10,000	(Slovenia) Polona Hercog (Liechtenstein) Stephanie Vogt; 7–6^{(2)} 6–3	(Spain) Leticia Costas Moreira (Spain) Maite Gabarrús-Alonso	(Spain) Maite Gabarrús-Alonso (Spain) Rebeca Bou Nogueiro	(Italy) Lisa Sabino (Italy) Valentina Sulpizio (France) Laura Thorpe (Spain) Irene Rehberger Bescos	
February 11, 2008	Arezzo, Italy; Indoor Clay $10,000	(Italy) Evelyn Mayr; 6–4 6–3	(Ukraine) Anastasia Grymalska	(Ukraine) Irina Buryachok (Germany) Anne Schäfer	(Austria) Patricia Mayr (Italy) Cristina Celani (Russia) Marina Shamayko (Italy) Stefania Chieppa	
February 11, 2008	Arezzo, Italy; Indoor Clay $10,000	(Italy) Giulia Gatto-Monticone (Italy) Federica Quercia; 7–5 6–1	(Ukraine) Tetyana Arefyeva (Belgium) Aude Vermoezen	(Ukraine) Irina Buryachok (Germany) Anne Schäfer	(Austria) Patricia Mayr (Italy) Cristina Celani (Russia) Marina Shamayko (Italy) Stefania Chieppa	
February 11, 2008	Albufeira, Portugal; Hard $10,000	(Spain) Sara del Barrio Aragón; 0–6 6–3 6–4	(Slovakia) Dominika Nociarová	(Ukraine) Nadiia Kichenok (Russia) Elena Chalova	(Czech Republic) Kateřina Kramperová (United States) Lena Litvak (Portugal) Catarina Ferreira (Bulgaria) Tanya Raykova	
February 11, 2008	Albufeira, Portugal; Hard $10,000	(Israel) Julia Glushko (Russia) Marina Melnikova; 6–3 0–6 [11–9]	(Slovakia) Martina Babáková (Russia) Elena Chalova	(Ukraine) Nadiia Kichenok (Russia) Elena Chalova	(Czech Republic) Kateřina Kramperová (United States) Lena Litvak (Portugal) Catarina Ferreira (Bulgaria) Tanya Raykova	
February 11, 2008	Berri, Australia; Grass $25,000	(Australia) Nicole Kriz; 6–4 4–6 7–6^{(3)}	(New Zealand) Marina Erakovic	(Australia) Monique Adamczak (Mauritius) Marinne Giraud	(Australia) Sally Peers (Japan) Ayaka Maekawa (Australia) Olivia Rogowska (Chinese Taipei) Hwang I-hsuan	
February 11, 2008	Berri, Australia; Grass $25,000	(New Zealand) Marina Erakovic (Australia) Nicole Kriz; 2–6 7–6^{(4)} [10–3]	(Australia) Shannon Golds (Australia) Emelyn Starr	(Australia) Monique Adamczak (Mauritius) Marinne Giraud	(Australia) Sally Peers (Japan) Ayaka Maekawa (Australia) Olivia Rogowska (Chinese Taipei) Hwang I-hsuan	
February 11, 2008	Stockholm, Sweden; Indoor Hard $25,000	(Sweden) Johanna Larsson; 0–6 6–1 7–6^{(1)}	(Czech Republic) Barbora Záhlavová-Strýcová	(Sweden) Michaela Johansson (France) Youlia Fedossova	(Montenegro) Danica Krstajić (Slovenia) Maša Zec Peškirič (Belarus) Anastasiya Yakimova (United Kingdom) Anne Keothavong	
February 11, 2008	Stockholm, Sweden; Indoor Hard $25,000	(Sweden) Johanna Larsson (United Kingdom) Anna Smith; 6–0 7–5	(Serbia) Neda Kozić (Croatia) Ivana Lisjak	(Sweden) Michaela Johansson (France) Youlia Fedossova	(Montenegro) Danica Krstajić (Slovenia) Maša Zec Peškirič (Belarus) Anastasiya Yakimova (United Kingdom) Anne Keothavong	
February 18, 2008	Melilla, Spain; Hard $10,000	(Ukraine) Tetyana Arefyeva; 6–1 7–6^{(1)}	(Bulgaria) Desislava Mladenova	(Romania) Cristina Mitu (United Kingdom) Katharina Brown	(Spain) Nuria Párrizas Díaz (France) Charlotte Rodier (France) Shérazad Benamar (Belgium) Aude Vermoezen	
February 18, 2008	Melilla, Spain; Hard $10,000	(Italy) Marina Caciotti (Italy) Nicole Clerico; 3–6 7–6^{(5)} [10–8]	(Spain) Melisa Cabrera-Handt (Poland) Monika Krauze	(Romania) Cristina Mitu (United Kingdom) Katharina Brown	(Spain) Nuria Párrizas Díaz (France) Charlotte Rodier (France) Shérazad Benamar (Belgium) Aude Vermoezen	
February 18, 2008	Portimão, Portugal; Hard $10,000	(Russia) Elena Chalova; 6–4 6–4	(Russia) Nina Bratchikova	(Spain) Beatriz García Vidagany (Netherlands) Chayenne Ewijk	(Russia) Vasilisa Davydova (Slovakia) Dominika Nociarová (Latvia) Irina Kuzmina (United Kingdom) Naomi Broady	
February 18, 2008	Portimão, Portugal; Hard $10,000	(France) Émilie Bacquet (Netherlands) Chayenne Ewijk w/o	(Russia) Elena Chalova (Armenia) Liudmila Nikoyan	(Spain) Beatriz García Vidagany (Netherlands) Chayenne Ewijk	(Russia) Vasilisa Davydova (Slovakia) Dominika Nociarová (Latvia) Irina Kuzmina (United Kingdom) Naomi Broady	
February 18, 2008	Benin City, Nigeria; Hard $10,000	(Ukraine) Anastasiya Kharchenko; 6–3 6–1	(Germany) Karolina Nowak	(Israel) Keren Shlomo (Ukraine) Anna Piven	(France) Amandine Cazeaux (Chile) Giannina Minieri (India) Prerna-Mythri Appineni (Australia) Alison Shemon	
February 18, 2008	Benin City, Nigeria; Hard $10,000	(Belgium) Davinia Lobbinger (United Kingdom) Olivia Scarfi; 7–5 6–4	(Germany) Laura Bsoul (Australia) Alison Shemon	(Israel) Keren Shlomo (Ukraine) Anna Piven	(France) Amandine Cazeaux (Chile) Giannina Minieri (India) Prerna-Mythri Appineni (Australia) Alison Shemon	
February 18, 2008	(United States) Clearwater, Florida, USA; Hard $25,000	(Russia) Regina Kulikova; 6–4 6–4	(Israel) Yevgenia Savransky	(United States) Abigail Spears (United States) Melanie Oudin	(United States) Ahsha Rolle (Switzerland) Stefanie Vögele (Japan) Yurika Sema (Ukraine) Tetiana Luzhanska	
February 18, 2008	(United States) Clearwater, Florida, USA; Hard $25,000	(United Kingdom) Anna Fitzpatrick (Serbia) Ana Veselinović; 6–2 3–6 [10–6]	(Chinese Taipei) Chan Chin-wei (Japan) Seiko Okamoto	(United States) Abigail Spears (United States) Melanie Oudin	(United States) Ahsha Rolle (Switzerland) Stefanie Vögele (Japan) Yurika Sema (Ukraine) Tetiana Luzhanska	
February 18, 2008	Capriolo, Italy; Indoor Carpet $25,000	(United Kingdom) Anne Keothavong; 6–1 2–6 6–3	(Russia) Vesna Manasieva	(Poland) Joanna Sakowicz (Czech Republic) Sandra Záhlavová	(Croatia) Darija Jurak (Croatia) Ivana Lisjak (Czech Republic) Lucie Hradecká (Luxembourg) Claudine Schaul	
February 18, 2008	Capriolo, Italy; Indoor Carpet $25,000	(United Kingdom) Sarah Borwell (South Africa) Kelly Anderson; 7–6^{(7)} 6–4	(Croatia) Darija Jurak (Croatia) Ivana Lisjak	(Poland) Joanna Sakowicz (Czech Republic) Sandra Záhlavová	(Croatia) Darija Jurak (Croatia) Ivana Lisjak (Czech Republic) Lucie Hradecká (Luxembourg) Claudine Schaul	
February 25, 2008	Buchen, Germany; Indoor Carpet $10,000	(Belgium) Kirsten Flipkens; 6–1 3–6 6–4	(Czech Republic) Sandra Záhlavová	(Germany) Carmen Klaschka (Denmark) Hanne Skak Jensen	(Italy) Lisa Sabino (Germany) Georgie Stoop (Switzerland) Nicole Riner (Germany) Sabine Klaschka	
February 25, 2008	Buchen, Germany; Indoor Carpet $10,000	(Germany) Laura Haberkorn (Germany) Antonia Matic; 6–2 6–4	(Slovakia) Michaela Pochabová (Slovakia) Patrícia Verešová	(Germany) Carmen Klaschka (Denmark) Hanne Skak Jensen	(Italy) Lisa Sabino (Germany) Georgie Stoop (Switzerland) Nicole Riner (Germany) Sabine Klaschka	
February 25, 2008	Wellington, New Zealand; Hard $10,000	(Sweden) Michaela Johansson; 6–0 7–5	(Australia) Marija Mirkovic	(South Korea) Chae Kyung-yee (Thailand) Varatchaya Wongteanchai	(Australia) Cassandra Chan (Indonesia) Romana Tedjakusuma (China) Shao-Zhuo Liu (Japan) Tomoko Dokei	
February 25, 2008	Wellington, New Zealand; Hard $10,000	(Japan) Ayaka Maekawa (Thailand) Varatchaya Wongteanchai; 6–1 6–3	(Japan) Tomoko Dokei (Japan) Etsuko Kitazaki	(South Korea) Chae Kyung-yee (Thailand) Varatchaya Wongteanchai	(Australia) Cassandra Chan (Indonesia) Romana Tedjakusuma (China) Shao-Zhuo Liu (Japan) Tomoko Dokei	
February 25, 2008	Sant Boi, Spain; Clay $10,000	(Spain) Sara del Barrio Aragón; 7–5 7–5	(Argentina) Mailen Auroux	(Uruguay) Estefanía Craciún (Czech Republic) Simona Dobrá	(Italy) Elisa Balsamo (Germany) Tatjana Priachin (India) Sandhya Nagaraj (Ukraine) Tetyana Arefyeva	
February 25, 2008	Sant Boi, Spain; Clay $10,000	(Argentina) Mailen Auroux (Uruguay) Estefanía Craciún; 6–1 6–3	(Italy) Elisa Balsamo (Italy) Valentina Sulpizio	(Uruguay) Estefanía Craciún (Czech Republic) Simona Dobrá	(Italy) Elisa Balsamo (Germany) Tatjana Priachin (India) Sandhya Nagaraj (Ukraine) Tetyana Arefyeva	
February 25, 2008	Benin City, Nigeria; Hard $10,000	(Ukraine) Anastasiya Kharchenko; 6–3 6–4	(Belgium) Davinia Lobbinger	(Italy) Valentine Confalonieri (Brazil) Nathalia Rossi	(Germany) Laura Bsoul (Serbia) Nevena Selakovic (France) Anne-Valerie Evain (Ukraine) Ganna Piven	
February 25, 2008	Benin City, Nigeria; Hard $10,000	(Belgium) Davinia Lobbinger (United Kingdom) Olivia Scarfi; 6–4 6–3	(South Africa) Tegan Edwards (Ukraine) Ganna Piven	(Italy) Valentine Confalonieri (Brazil) Nathalia Rossi	(Germany) Laura Bsoul (Serbia) Nevena Selakovic (France) Anne-Valerie Evain (Ukraine) Ganna Piven	
February 25, 2008	(United States) Fort Walton Beach, Florida, USA; Hard $25,000	(Czech Republic) Barbora Záhlavová-Strýcová; 6–3 5–7 7–6^{(5)}	(United States) Melanie Oudin	(South Korea) Ye-Ra Lee (Israel) Yevgenia Savransky	(Switzerland) Stefanie Vögele (Croatia) Jelena Pandžić (Japan) Yurika Sema (Netherlands) Arantxa Rus	
February 25, 2008	(United States) Fort Walton Beach, Florida, USA; Hard $25,000	(United Kingdom) Anna Fitzpatrick (Serbia) Ana Veselinović; 6–3 7–6^{(4)}	(Netherlands) Nicole Thyssen (Netherlands) Pauline Wong	(South Korea) Ye-Ra Lee (Israel) Yevgenia Savransky	(Switzerland) Stefanie Vögele (Croatia) Jelena Pandžić (Japan) Yurika Sema (Netherlands) Arantxa Rus	

=== March ===
Week	Tournament	Winner	Runner-up	Semi finalists	Quarter finalists	Refs
March 3, 2008	Sabadell, Spain; Clay $10,000	(Italy) Elisa Balsamo; 6–3, 7–5	(Uruguay) Estefanía Craciún	(Chile) Melisa Miranda (Italy) Valentina Sulpizio	(Hong Kong) Ling Zhang (Spain) Eva Fernández Brugués (Argentina) Mailen Auroux (France) Nathalie Piquion	
March 3, 2008	Sabadell, Spain; Clay $10,000	(Italy) Giulia Gatto-Monticone (Italy) Federica Quercia; 6–2 6–0	(Italy) Elisa Balsamo (Italy) Valentina Sulpizio	(Chile) Melisa Miranda (Italy) Valentina Sulpizio	(Hong Kong) Ling Zhang (Spain) Eva Fernández Brugués (Argentina) Mailen Auroux (France) Nathalie Piquion	
March 3, 2008	Hamilton, New Zealand; Hard $10,000	(New Zealand) Ellen Barry; 6–7^{(1)} 6–1 6–4	(Australia) Anna Wishink	(New Zealand) Kairangi Vano (South Korea) Chae Kyung-yee	(Japan) Minori Takemoto (Japan) Maki Arai (Australia) Cassandra Chan (Sweden) Michaela Johansson	
March 3, 2008	Hamilton, New Zealand; Hard $10,000	(Japan) Maki Arai (Japan) Yurina Koshino; 7–6^{(3)} 7–6^{(2)}	(Australia) Alison Bai (Australia) Emelyn Starr	(New Zealand) Kairangi Vano (South Korea) Chae Kyung-yee	(Japan) Minori Takemoto (Japan) Maki Arai (Australia) Cassandra Chan (Sweden) Michaela Johansson	
March 3, 2008	Minsk, Belarus; Indoor Carpet $25,000	(Russia) Anastasia Pavlyuchenkova; 6–0 6–1	(Czech Republic) Nikola Fraňková	(Lithuania) Lina Stančiūtė (Russia) Anna Lapushchenkova	(Czech Republic) Tereza Hladíková (Croatia) Ana Vrljić (Kyrgyzstan) Ksenia Palkina (Russia) Vitalia Diatchenko	
March 3, 2008	Minsk, Belarus; Indoor Carpet $25,000	(Ukraine) Yuliya Beygelzima (Russia) Anna Lapushchenkova; 6–4 7–5	(Belarus) Ima Bohush (Belarus) Ksenia Milevskaya	(Lithuania) Lina Stančiūtė (Russia) Anna Lapushchenkova	(Czech Republic) Tereza Hladíková (Croatia) Ana Vrljić (Kyrgyzstan) Ksenia Palkina (Russia) Vitalia Diatchenko	
March 3, 2008	(United States) Las Vegas, USA; Hard $50,000	(France) Camille Pin; 6–4, 6–1	(United States) Asia Muhammad	(United States) Madison Brengle (China) Meng Yuan	(France) Stéphanie Cohen-Aloro (Russia) Ekaterina Bychkova (Croatia) Jelena Pandžić (United States) CoCo Vandeweghe	
March 3, 2008	(United States) Las Vegas, USA; Hard $50,000	(Hungary) Melinda Czink (Czech Republic) Renata Voráčová; 6–3 6–2	(Chinese Taipei) Chan Chin-wei (Ukraine) Tetiana Luzhanska	(United States) Madison Brengle (China) Meng Yuan	(France) Stéphanie Cohen-Aloro (Russia) Ekaterina Bychkova (Croatia) Jelena Pandžić (United States) CoCo Vandeweghe	
March 10, 2008	Dijon, France; Indoor Hard $10,000	(Poland) Olga Brózda; 7–5 4–6 6–4	(United Kingdom) Sarah Borwell	(Italy) Evelyn Mayr (France) Anne-Laure Heitz	(Germany) Sabine Klaschka (Czech Republic) Iveta Gerlová (France) Estelle Guisard (Croatia) Darija Jurak	
March 10, 2008	Dijon, France; Indoor Hard $10,000	(Slovakia) Martina Babáková (Czech Republic) Iveta Gerlová; 5–7 7–5 [10–4]	(United Kingdom) Danielle Brown (United Kingdom) Natasha Khan	(Italy) Evelyn Mayr (France) Anne-Laure Heitz	(Germany) Sabine Klaschka (Czech Republic) Iveta Gerlová (France) Estelle Guisard (Croatia) Darija Jurak	
March 10, 2008	Cairo, Egypt; Clay $10,000	(Russia) Elena Chalova; 6–2 6–3	(Romania) Alexandra Cadanțu	(Czech Republic) Simona Dobrá (Ukraine) Kateryna Avdiyenko	(Georgia (country)) Manana Shapakidze (Georgia (country)) Oksana Kalashnikova (Denmark) Hanne Skak Jensen (Romania) Camelia Hristea	
March 10, 2008	Cairo, Egypt; Clay $10,000	(Russia) Galina Fokina (Georgia (country)) Oksana Kalashnikova; 6–4 6–2	(Russia) Elena Chalova (Russia) Inna Sokolova	(Czech Republic) Simona Dobrá (Ukraine) Kateryna Avdiyenko	(Georgia (country)) Manana Shapakidze (Georgia (country)) Oksana Kalashnikova (Denmark) Hanne Skak Jensen (Romania) Camelia Hristea	
March 10, 2008	Real, Rome, Italy; Clay $10,000	(Italy) Astrid Besser; 6–2 6–3	(Poland) Anna Korzeniak	(Serbia) Neda Kozić (Italy) Giulia Gatto-Monticone	(Romania) Liana Balaci (Italy) Nancy Rustignoli (Bulgaria) Elitsa Kostova (Italy) Federica Quercia	
March 10, 2008	Real, Rome, Italy; Clay $10,000	(Romania) Ioana Ivan (Belarus) Ksenia Milevskaya; 6–4 6–2	(Italy) Stefania Chieppa (Italy) Valentina Sulpizio	(Serbia) Neda Kozić (Italy) Giulia Gatto-Monticone	(Romania) Liana Balaci (Italy) Nancy Rustignoli (Bulgaria) Elitsa Kostova (Italy) Federica Quercia	
March 10, 2008	Ramat HaSharon, Israel; Hard $10,000	(Slovakia) Lenka Jurikova; 6–4 6–3	(Greece) Irini Georgatou	(United States) Lena Litvak (Slovakia) Klaudia Boczová	(Netherlands) Marcella Koek (Israel) Chen Astrugo (Russia) Anna Rapoport (Italy) Martina Caciotti	
March 10, 2008	Ramat HaSharon, Israel; Hard $10,000	(Italy) Nicole Clerico (United States) Lena Litvak; 6–3 6–1	(United States) Katie Ruckert (Belgium) Aude Vermoezen	(United States) Lena Litvak (Slovakia) Klaudia Boczová	(Netherlands) Marcella Koek (Israel) Chen Astrugo (Russia) Anna Rapoport (Italy) Martina Caciotti	
March 10, 2008	Kalgoorlie, Australia; Hard $25,000	(China) Zhou Yimiao; 7–5 6–2	(New Zealand) Ellen Barry	(Australia) Shannon Golds (Romania) Ágnes Szatmári	(United Kingdom) Melanie South (Mauritius) Marinne Giraud (Australia) Christina Wheeler (Australia) Alison Bai	
March 10, 2008	Kalgoorlie, Australia; Hard $25,000	(China) Li Ting (China) Zhou Yimiao; 6–1 4–6 [10–8]	(Japan) Natsumi Hamamura (Japan) Remi Tezuka	(Australia) Shannon Golds (Romania) Ágnes Szatmári	(United Kingdom) Melanie South (Mauritius) Marinne Giraud (Australia) Christina Wheeler (Australia) Alison Bai	
March 10, 2008	Las Palmas de Gran Canaria, Spain; Hard $25,000	(Netherlands) Chayenne Ewijk; 4–6 7–6^{(4)} 7–6^{(4)}	(Belgium) Kirsten Flipkens	(Croatia) Nika Ožegović (Spain) Maria José Martínez	(Greece) Anna Gerasimou (Ukraine) Yuliya Beygelzimer (France) Irena Pavlovic (Spain) Carla Suárez Navarro	
March 10, 2008	Las Palmas de Gran Canaria, Spain; Hard $25,000	(Spain) Marta Marrero (Spain) María José Martínez Sánchez; 6–2 7–6^{(1)}	(Greece) Anna Gerasimou (United Kingdom) Anna Hawkins	(Croatia) Nika Ožegović (Spain) Maria José Martínez	(Greece) Anna Gerasimou (Ukraine) Yuliya Beygelzimer (France) Irena Pavlovic (Spain) Carla Suárez Navarro	
March 10, 2008	New Delhi, India; Hard $50,000	(Belarus) Ekaterina Dzehalevich; 2–6 6–3 6–2	(Belgium) Yanina Wickmayer	(Estonia) Margit Rüütel (United Kingdom) Naomi Cavaday	(India) Sunitha Rao (Hungary) Anikó Kapros (South Africa) Chanelle Scheepers (Germany) Carmen Klaschka	
March 10, 2008	New Delhi, India; Hard $50,000	(China) Ji Chunmei (China) Sun Shengnan; 2–6 6–2 [10–4]	(India) Sunitha Rao (France) Aurélie Védy	(Estonia) Margit Rüütel (United Kingdom) Naomi Cavaday	(India) Sunitha Rao (Hungary) Anikó Kapros (South Africa) Chanelle Scheepers (Germany) Carmen Klaschka	
March 17, 2008	Bath, United Kingdom; Indoor Hard $10,000	(United Kingdom) Sarah Borwell; 6–4 7–6^{(5)}	(France) Stephanie Vongsouthi	(Poland) Patrycja Sanduska (France) Estelle Guisard	(United Kingdom) Natasha Khan (United Kingdom) Olivia Scarfi (France) Mailyne Andrieux (Czech Republic) Iveta Gerlová	
March 17, 2008	Bath, United Kingdom; Indoor Hard $10,000	(Slovakia) Martina Babáková (Czech Republic) Iveta Gerlová; 6–1 5–7 [10–1]	(United Kingdom) Sarah Borwell (United Kingdom) Olivia Scarfi	(Poland) Patrycja Sanduska (France) Estelle Guisard	(United Kingdom) Natasha Khan (United Kingdom) Olivia Scarfi (France) Mailyne Andrieux (Czech Republic) Iveta Gerlová	
March 17, 2008	Pomezia, Rome, Italy; Clay $10,000	(Poland) Anna Korzeniak; 6–3 6–3	(Romania) Liana Balaci	(Slovakia) Lenka Wienerová (Italy) Alexia Virgili	(Italy) Giulia Remondina (Italy) Valentina Sulpizio (Italy) Federica Quercia (Hong Kong) Ling Zhang	
March 17, 2008	Pomezia, Rome, Italy; Clay $10,000	(Poland) Magdalena Kiszczyńska (Belarus) Ksenia Milevskaya; 6–0 6–4	(Italy) Giulia Gatto-Monticone (Italy) Federica Quercia	(Slovakia) Lenka Wienerová (Italy) Alexia Virgili	(Italy) Giulia Remondina (Italy) Valentina Sulpizio (Italy) Federica Quercia (Hong Kong) Ling Zhang	
March 17, 2008	Ain Alsoukhna, Egypt; Clay $10,000	(Poland) Katarzyna Piter; 7–6^{(7)} 6–4	(Romania) Irina-Camelia Begu	(Georgia (country)) Oksana Kalashnikova (Ukraine) Kateryna Avdiyenko	(Romania) Alexandra Cadanțu (Russia) Galina Fokina (Denmark) Hanne Skak Jensen (Morocco) Fatima El Allami	
March 17, 2008	Ain Alsoukhna, Egypt; Clay $10,000	(Oman) Fatma Al-Nabhani (Morocco) Fatima El Allami; 6–4 6–4	(Ukraine) Yelyzaveta Rybakova (France) Nadège Vergos	(Georgia (country)) Oksana Kalashnikova (Ukraine) Kateryna Avdiyenko	(Romania) Alexandra Cadanțu (Russia) Galina Fokina (Denmark) Hanne Skak Jensen (Morocco) Fatima El Allami	
March 17, 2008	Porto Rafti, Greece; Hard $10,000	(Slovakia) Lenka Juríková; 6–1 7–6^{(5)}	(Czech Republic) Jana Jandová	(Ukraine) Tetyana Arefyeva (Greece) Irini Georgatou	(Slovakia) Monika Kochanová (Greece) Despina Papamichail (Italy) Nicole Clerico (Germany) Dominice Ripoll	
March 17, 2008	Porto Rafti, Greece; Hard $10,000	(Israel) Julia Glushko (Germany) Dominice Ripoll; 1–6 7–5 [10–7]	(Ukraine) Yelyzaveta Rybakova (Slovenia) Mika Urbančič	(Ukraine) Tetyana Arefyeva (Greece) Irini Georgatou	(Slovakia) Monika Kochanová (Greece) Despina Papamichail (Italy) Nicole Clerico (Germany) Dominice Ripoll	
March 17, 2008	Amiens, France; Indoor Clay $10,000	(France) Karla Mraz; 6–4 5–7 6–1	(Germany) Sarah Gronert	(Belarus) Iryna Kuryanovich (Italy) Evelyn Mayr	(Liechtenstein) Stephanie Vogt (Slovakia) Karin Morgosova (France) Émilie Bacquet (France) Charlotte Rodier	
March 17, 2008	Amiens, France; Indoor Clay $10,000	(Poland) Olga Brózda (Belarus) Volha Duko; 6–2 6–3	(Portugal) Magali de Lattre (Sweden) Madeleine Saari–Bystrom	(Belarus) Iryna Kuryanovich (Italy) Evelyn Mayr	(Liechtenstein) Stephanie Vogt (Slovakia) Karin Morgosova (France) Émilie Bacquet (France) Charlotte Rodier	
March 17, 2008	Vsevolozhsk, St.Petersburg, Russia; Indoor Hard $25,000	(Slovakia) Magdaléna Rybáriková; 6–4 6–2	(Russia) Anna Lapushchenkova	(Ukraine) Oxana Lyubtsova (Russia) Vitalia Diatchenko	(Ukraine) Anastasiya Vasylyeva (Russia) Anastasia Pavlyuchenkova (Netherlands) Nicole Thyssen (Czech Republic) Nikola Fraňková	
March 17, 2008	Vsevolozhsk, St.Petersburg, Russia; Indoor Hard $25,000	(Czech Republic) Nikola Fraňková (Russia) Anastasia Pavlyuchenkova; 6–2 6–2	(Russia) Nina Bratchikova (Russia) Vasilisa Davydova	(Ukraine) Oxana Lyubtsova (Russia) Vitalia Diatchenko	(Ukraine) Anastasiya Vasylyeva (Russia) Anastasia Pavlyuchenkova (Netherlands) Nicole Thyssen (Czech Republic) Nikola Fraňková	
March 17, 2008	Tenerife, Spain; Hard $25,000	(Israel) Tzipora Obziler; 6–2 6–3	(Spain) Carla Suárez Navarro	(France) Julie Coin (Germany) Kristina Barrois	(France) Irena Pavlovic (Croatia) Nika Ožegović (Belarus) Anastasiya Yakimova (France) Virginie Pichet	
March 17, 2008	Tenerife, Spain; Hard $25,000	(France) Julie Coin (France) Violette Huck; 6–4 6–3	(Bosnia and Herzegovina) Mervana Jugić-Salkić (Israel) Tzipora Obziler	(France) Julie Coin (Germany) Kristina Barrois	(France) Irena Pavlovic (Croatia) Nika Ožegović (Belarus) Anastasiya Yakimova (France) Virginie Pichet	
March 17, 2008	Sorrento, Australia; Hard $25,000	(United Kingdom) Melanie South; 7–5 6–7^{(6)} 6–4	(Australia) Christina Wheeler	(New Zealand) Ellen Barry (Australia) Jessica Moore	(Mauritius) Marinne Giraud (China) Zhou Yimiao (Chinese Taipei) Kai-Chen Chang (Australia) Brittany Sheed	
March 17, 2008	Sorrento, Australia; Hard $25,000	(United Kingdom) Melanie South (Australia) Monique Adamczak; 6–2 6–4	(Chinese Taipei) Chang Kai-chen (Chinese Taipei) Hwang I-hsuan	(New Zealand) Ellen Barry (Australia) Jessica Moore	(Mauritius) Marinne Giraud (China) Zhou Yimiao (Chinese Taipei) Kai-Chen Chang (Australia) Brittany Sheed	
March 17, 2008	Noida, India; Hard $25,000	(Latvia) Anastasija Sevastova; 6–2 6–1	(India) Sunitha Rao	(Estonia) Margit Rüütel (Uzbekistan) Vlada Ekshibarova	(Indonesia) Sandy Gumulya (Thailand) Varatchaya Wongteanchai (Hungary) Anikó Kapros (Thailand) Montinee Tangphong	
March 17, 2008	Noida, India; Hard $25,000	(Serbia) Teodora Mirčić (Slovakia) Lenka Tvarošková; 6–2 6–7^{(7)} [10–6]	(South Africa) Kelly Anderson (South Africa) Chanelle Scheepers	(Estonia) Margit Rüütel (Uzbekistan) Vlada Ekshibarova	(Indonesia) Sandy Gumulya (Thailand) Varatchaya Wongteanchai (Hungary) Anikó Kapros (Thailand) Montinee Tangphong	
March 17, 2008	(United States) Redding, California, USA; Hard $25,000	(Czech Republic) Barbora Záhlavová-Strýcová; 7–6^{(4)} 6–3	(Canada) Aleksandra Wozniak	(Czech Republic) Petra Cetkovská (Canada) Stéphanie Dubois	(United States) Angela Haynes (Ukraine) Tetiana Luzhanska (Croatia) Jelena Pandžić (Japan) Akiko Yonemura	
March 17, 2008	(United States) Redding, California, USA; Hard $25,000	(United States) Angela Haynes (United States) Abigail Spears; 6–4 6–3	(Chinese Taipei) Chan Chin-wei (Ukraine) Tetiana Luzhanska	(Czech Republic) Petra Cetkovská (Canada) Stéphanie Dubois	(United States) Angela Haynes (Ukraine) Tetiana Luzhanska (Croatia) Jelena Pandžić (Japan) Akiko Yonemura	
March 24, 2008	Goudi, Athens, Greece; Hard $10,000	(Italy) Alice Moroni; 6–3 6–4	(Ukraine) Tetyana Arefyeva	(Greece) Irini Georgatou (United States) Lena Litvak	(Slovenia) Mika Urbančič (Italy) Raffaella Bindi (Slovakia) Lenka Jurikova (Georgia (country)) Sofia Kvatsabaia	
March 24, 2008	Goudi, Athens, Greece; Hard $10,000	(Austria) Nikola Hofmanova (Italy) Vivienne Vierin; 5–7 7–5 [10–7]	(Italy) Raffaella Bindi (Bulgaria) Biljana Pawlowa-Dimitrova	(Greece) Irini Georgatou (United States) Lena Litvak	(Slovenia) Mika Urbančič (Italy) Raffaella Bindi (Slovakia) Lenka Jurikova (Georgia (country)) Sofia Kvatsabaia	
March 24, 2008	Cairo, Egypt; Clay $10,000	(Poland) Katarzyna Piter; 6–1 6–3	(Netherlands) Bibiane Schoofs	(Russia) Galina Fokina (Georgia (country)) Oksana Kalashnikova	(Denmark) Hanne Skak Jensen (Poland) Sylwia Zagórska (Czech Republic) Simona Dobrá (Uzbekistan) Albina Khabibulina	
March 24, 2008	Cairo, Egypt; Clay $10,000	(Russia) Galina Fokina (Georgia (country)) Oksana Kalashnikova; 7–6^{(4)} 6–4	(Russia) Anna Savitskaya (Netherlands) Bibiane Schoofs	(Russia) Galina Fokina (Georgia (country)) Oksana Kalashnikova	(Denmark) Hanne Skak Jensen (Poland) Sylwia Zagórska (Czech Republic) Simona Dobrá (Uzbekistan) Albina Khabibulina	
March 24, 2008	Jersey, United Kingdom; Indoor Hard $25,000	(United Kingdom) Elena Baltacha; 6–1 6–3	(Croatia) Ana Vrljić	(Germany) Tanja Ostertag (Lithuania) Lina Stančiūtė	(United Kingdom) Katie O'Brien (Italy) Verdiana Verardi (France) Violette Huck (United Kingdom) Amanda Elliott	
March 24, 2008	Jersey, United Kingdom; Indoor Hard $25,000	(United States) Courtney Nagle (United States) RobinStephenson; 6–3 6–3	(France) Youlia Fedossova (France) Violette Huck	(Germany) Tanja Ostertag (Lithuania) Lina Stančiūtė	(United Kingdom) Katie O'Brien (Italy) Verdiana Verardi (France) Violette Huck (United Kingdom) Amanda Elliott	
March 24, 2008	(United States) Hammond, USA; Hard $25,000	(United States) Carly Gullickson; 6–4 4–6 6–4	(Georgia (country)) Margalita Chakhnashvili	(United States) Angela Haynes (United States) Chelsey Gullickson	(Argentina) Soledad Esperón (Ukraine) Tetiana Luzhanska (Slovenia) Petra Rampre (United States) Ashley Weinhold	
March 24, 2008	(United States) Hammond, USA; Hard $25,000	(United States) Raquel Kops-Jones (United States) Abigail Spears; 7–5 6–4	(United States) Carly Gullickson (United States) Chelsey Gullickson	(United States) Angela Haynes (United States) Chelsey Gullickson	(Argentina) Soledad Esperón (Ukraine) Tetiana Luzhanska (Slovenia) Petra Rampre (United States) Ashley Weinhold	
March 24, 2008	La Palma, Spain; Hard $25,000	(Germany) Kristina Barrois; 5–1 ret.	(Bosnia and Herzegovina) Mervana Jugić-Salkić	(Switzerland) Stefanie Vögele (Portugal) Neuza Silva	(Uruguay) Estefanía Craciún (Spain) Sílvia Soler Espinosa (Spain) Arantxa Parra Santonja (Romania) Simona Halep	
March 24, 2008	La Palma, Spain; Hard $25,000	(Ukraine) Yuliya Beygelzimer (Switzerland) Stefanie Vögele; 7–5 7–6^{(5)}	(Spain) Estrella Cabeza Candela (Spain) Sílvia Soler Espinosa	(Switzerland) Stefanie Vögele (Portugal) Neuza Silva	(Uruguay) Estefanía Craciún (Spain) Sílvia Soler Espinosa (Spain) Arantxa Parra Santonja (Romania) Simona Halep	
March 24, 2008	Tessenderlo, Belgium; Indoor clay $25,000	(Belgium) Kirsten Flipkens; 7–5 6–1	(Belgium) Caroline Maes	(Italy) Anna Floris (Poland) Olga Brózda	(Slovakia) Martina Balogová (Colombia) Mariana Duque (Israel) Yevgenia Savransky (Belgium) Soetkin Van Deun	
March 24, 2008	Tessenderlo, Belgium; Indoor clay $25,000	(Netherlands) Daniëlle Harmsen (Netherlands) Marlot Meddens; 6–4 6–4	(Poland) Olga Brózda (Russia) Maria Kondratieva	(Italy) Anna Floris (Poland) Olga Brózda	(Slovakia) Martina Balogová (Colombia) Mariana Duque (Israel) Yevgenia Savransky (Belgium) Soetkin Van Deun	
March 24, 2008	Moscow, Russia; Indoor hard $25,000	(Russia) Anastasia Pavlyuchenkova; 6–0 6–2	(Belarus) Ekaterina Dzehalevich	(Czech Republic) Nikola Fraňková (Russia) Julia Efremova	(Russia) Evgenia Grebenyuk (Russia) Maria Mokh (Russia) Nina Bratchikova (Russia) Ksenia Pervak	
March 24, 2008	Moscow, Russia; Indoor hard $25,000	(Czech Republic) Nikola Fraňková (Russia) Anastasia Pavlyuchenkova; 6–3 6–2	(Russia) Marina Shamayko (Georgia (country)) Sofia Shapatava	(Czech Republic) Nikola Fraňková (Russia) Julia Efremova	(Russia) Evgenia Grebenyuk (Russia) Maria Mokh (Russia) Nina Bratchikova (Russia) Ksenia Pervak	
March 24, 2008	(Italy) Latina, Lazio; Clay $50,000	(Czech Republic) Iveta Benešová; 6–0 6–2	(Bulgaria) Sesil Karatantcheva	(France) Olivia Sanchez (France) Mathilde Johansson	(Romania) Liana Balaci (Spain) Carla Suárez Navarro (Russia) Ekaterina Ivanova (Spain) Nuria Llagostera Vives	
March 24, 2008	(Italy) Latina, Lazio; Clay $50,000	(Italy) Elisa Balsamo (Italy) Valentina Sulpizio; 0–6 7–6^{(6)} [10–7]	(Bosnia and Herzegovina) Sandra Martinović (Germany) Kathrin Wörle	(France) Olivia Sanchez (France) Mathilde Johansson	(Romania) Liana Balaci (Spain) Carla Suárez Navarro (Russia) Ekaterina Ivanova (Spain) Nuria Llagostera Vives	
March 31, 2008	Belek, Antalya province, Turkey; Clay $10,000	(Italy) Valentina Sulpizio; 6–3 6–3	(Netherlands) Marcella Koek	(Israel) Chen Astrugo (Czech Republic) Barbora Křtěnová	(Romania) Simona Matei (Slovakia) Patrícia Verešová (Turkey) Çağla Büyükakçay (United Kingdom) Amanda Carreras	
March 31, 2008	Belek, Antalya province, Turkey; Clay $10,000	(Romania) Simona Matei (Italy) Valentina Sulpizio; 6–2 5–7 [10–4]	(Russia) Eugeniya Pashkova (Russia) Avgusta Tsybysheva	(Israel) Chen Astrugo (Czech Republic) Barbora Křtěnová	(Romania) Simona Matei (Slovakia) Patrícia Verešová (Turkey) Çağla Büyükakçay (United Kingdom) Amanda Carreras	
March 31, 2008	Obregón, Mexico; Hard $10,000	(Mexico) Valeria Pulido; 6–2 6–7^{(3)} 6–2	(United States) Anne Yelsey	(Brazil) Fernanda Hermenegildo (Czech Republic) Kateřina Kramperová	(Austria) Franziska Klotz (Argentina) Tatiana Búa (Argentina) Carla Beltrami (Chile) Andrea Koch Benvenuto	
March 31, 2008	Obregón, Mexico; Hard $10,000	(Japan) Miki Miyamura (United States) Anne Yelsey; 6–0 6–1	(Brazil) Ana Clara Duarte (Brazil) Fernanda Hermenegildo	(Brazil) Fernanda Hermenegildo (Czech Republic) Kateřina Kramperová	(Austria) Franziska Klotz (Argentina) Tatiana Búa (Argentina) Carla Beltrami (Chile) Andrea Koch Benvenuto	
March 31, 2008	(United States) Pelham, Alabama, USA; Clay $25,000	(United States) Raquel Kops-Jones; 6–3 6–4	(Paraguay) Rossana de los Ríos	(Argentina) María Irigoyen (Argentina) Soledad Esperón	(United States) Carly Gullickson (Croatia) Maria Abramović (United States) Chelsey Gullickson (United States) Angela Haynes	
March 31, 2008	(United States) Pelham, Alabama, USA; Clay $25,000	(Czech Republic) Michaela Paštiková (United States) Ahsha Rolle; 7–5 6–2	(South Korea) Lee Ye-ra (Japan) Remi Tezuka	(Argentina) María Irigoyen (Argentina) Soledad Esperón	(United States) Carly Gullickson (Croatia) Maria Abramović (United States) Chelsey Gullickson (United States) Angela Haynes	
March 31, 2008	Civitavecchia, Italy; Clay $25,000	(Argentina) Betina Jozami; 6–2 6–2	(Slovenia) Polona Hercog	(France) Mathilde Johansson (Argentina) Mailen Auroux	(Czech Republic) Zuzana Ondrášková (Argentina) Jorgelina Cravero (Bulgaria) Sesil Karatantcheva (France) Olivia Sanchez	
March 31, 2008	Civitavecchia, Italy; Clay $25,000	(Argentina) Jorgelina Cravero (Argentina) Betina Jozami; 4–6 6–3 [10–6]	(Italy) Stefania Chieppa (Belarus) Darya Kustova	(France) Mathilde Johansson (Argentina) Mailen Auroux	(Czech Republic) Zuzana Ondrášková (Argentina) Jorgelina Cravero (Bulgaria) Sesil Karatantcheva (France) Olivia Sanchez	
March 31, 2008	Hamburg, Germany; Indoor Carpet $25,000	(Germany) Kristina Barrois; 6–2 ret.	(Croatia) Ana Vrljić	(Czech Republic) Andrea Hlaváčková (Germany) Julia Görges	(Switzerland) Stefanie Vögele (Romania) Ágnes Szatmári (France) Estelle Guisard (Ukraine) Yuliya Beygelzimer	
March 31, 2008	Hamburg, Germany; Indoor Carpet $25,000	(Ukraine) Yuliya Beygelzimer (Switzerland) Stefanie Vögele; 7–6^{(3)} 6–2	(Czech Republic) Veronika Chvojková (Czech Republic) Andrea Hlaváčková	(Czech Republic) Andrea Hlaváčková (Germany) Julia Görges	(Switzerland) Stefanie Vögele (Romania) Ágnes Szatmári (France) Estelle Guisard (Ukraine) Yuliya Beygelzimer	
March 31, 2008	Patras, Greece; Hard $50,000	(Slovakia) Magdaléna Rybáriková; 6–3 7–5	(United Kingdom) Anne Keothavong	(Belarus) Anastasiya Yakimova (Liechtenstein) Stephanie Vogt	(United Kingdom) Naomi Cavaday (United Kingdom) Melanie South (Greece) Anna Gerasimou (Israel) Tzipora Obziler	
March 31, 2008	Patras, Greece; Hard $50,000	(Israel) Tzipora Obziler (Belarus) Anastasiya Yakimova; 7–5 6–1	(Spain) María José Martínez Sánchez (Spain) Arantxa Parra Santonja	(Belarus) Anastasiya Yakimova (Liechtenstein) Stephanie Vogt	(United Kingdom) Naomi Cavaday (United Kingdom) Melanie South (Greece) Anna Gerasimou (Israel) Tzipora Obziler	
March 31, 2008	Torhout, Belgium; Indoor Hard $75,000	(United Kingdom) Elena Baltacha; 6–7^{(5)} 6–1 6–4	(Czech Republic) Iveta Benešová	(Germany) Sandra Klösel (Netherlands) Nicole Thyssen	(Belgium) Yanina Wickmayer (France) Stéphanie Foretz (Croatia) Nika Ožegović (Czech Republic) Eva Hrdinová	
March 31, 2008	Torhout, Belgium; Indoor Hard $75,000	(Russia) Anastasia Pavlyuchenkova (Belgium) Yanina Wickmayer; 6–4 4–6 [10–8]	(France) Stéphanie Cohen-Aloro (Tunisia) Selima Sfar	(Germany) Sandra Klösel (Netherlands) Nicole Thyssen	(Belgium) Yanina Wickmayer (France) Stéphanie Foretz (Croatia) Nika Ožegović (Czech Republic) Eva Hrdinová	

== See also ==
- 2008 ITF Women's Circuit (April–June)
- 2008 ITF Women's Circuit (July–September)
