= 2007 Sunfeast Open – Singles =

Singles
- 2007 Sunfeast Open

Final
- Champion: (Russia) Maria Kirilenko
- Runner-up: (Ukraine) Mariya Koryttseva
- Score: 6–0, 6–2

Events
| Singles | Doubles |
| ← 2006 · | Sunfeast Open |

Martina Hingis was the defending champion, but chose not to participate that year.

Maria Kirilenko won the title, defeating Mariya Koryttseva 6–0, 6–2 in the final.

== Seeds ==
1. (France) Marion Bartoli (first round)
2. (Slovakia) Daniela Hantuchová (semifinals)
3. (India) ~~Sania Mirza~~ (withdrew due to a right wrist sprain)
4. (Russia) Maria Kirilenko (champion)
5. (Russia) Alla Kudryavtseva (first round)
6. (France) ~~Alizé Cornet~~ (withdrew due to back pain)
7. (Italy) Flavia Pennetta (quarterfinals)
8. (Chinese Taipei) Chan Yung-jan (quarterfinals)
9. (Russia) Yaroslava Shvedova (first round)

== Draw ==
=== Key ===
- Q = Qualifier
- WC = Wild card
- LL = Lucky loser
- Alt = Alternate
- SE = Special exempt
- PR = Protected ranking
- ITF = ITF entry
- JE = Junior exempt
- w/o = Walkover
- r = Retired
- d = Defaulted
- SR = Special ranking

=== Final ===
Semifinals
(Ukraine) Mariya Koryttseva | 7 | 6
(United Kingdom) Anne Keothavong | 6^{3} | 3
4 | (Russia) Maria Kirilenko | 4 | 6 | 6
2 | (Slovakia) Daniela Hantuchová | 6 | 2 | 1

Final
(Ukraine) Mariya Koryttseva | 0 | 2
4 | (Russia) Maria Kirilenko | 6 | 6

=== Top half ===
First round
1 | (France) M Bartoli | 1 | 5
(United States) V King | 6 | 7
(Ukraine) M Koryttseva | 6 | 6
LL | (Australia) M Adamczak | 3 | 3
(Italy) A Brianti | 2 | 5
(Sweden) S Arvidsson | 6 | 7
(Belarus) T Poutchek | 6 | 6
5 | (Russia) A Kudryavtseva | 3 | 3
LL | (Indonesia) S Gumulya | 6 | 4 | 2
WC | (United States) S Rao | 2 | 6 | 6
(Italy) S Errani | 4 | 4
(United Kingdom) A Keothavong | 6 | 6
(Australia) C Dellacqua | 6 | 6
(Canada) A Wozniak | 2 | 3
(Israel) T Obziler | 7 | 6^{8} | 6
9 | (Russia) Y Shvedova | 6^{6} | 7 | 1

Second round
(United States) V King | 1 | 2
(Ukraine) M Koryttseva | 6 | 6
(Sweden) S Arvidsson | 3 | 1
(Belarus) T Poutchek | 6 | 6
WC | (United States) S Rao | 3 | 2
(United Kingdom) A Keothavong | 6 | 6
(Australia) C Dellacqua | 6 | 3 | 5
(Israel) T Obziler | 4 | 6 | 7

Quarterfinals
(Ukraine) M Koryttseva | 6 | 6
(Belarus) T Poutchek | 4 | 2
(United Kingdom) A Keothavong | 6 | 6
(Israel) T Obziler | 1 | 3

Semifinals
(Ukraine) M Koryttseva | 7 | 6
(United Kingdom) A Keothavong | 6^{3} | 3

=== Bottom half ===
First round
7 | (Italy) F Pennetta | 6 | 6
WC | (India) T Iyer | 3 | 1
(Uzbekistan) A Amanmuradova | 6
(Romania) E Gallovits | 2 | r
Q | (United Kingdom) N Cavaday | 3 | 6 | 2
Q | (Russia) E Ivanova | 6 | 2 | 6
Q | (United States) N Uberoi | 2 | 2
4 | (Russia) M Kirilenko | 6 | 6
8 | (Chinese Taipei) Y-j Chan | 6 | 6
WC | (India) K Shroff | 0 | 0
(Slovakia) J Gajdošová | 6 | 6
(France) Y Fedossova | 3 | 4
(Russia) A Rodionova | 6 | 6
(Czech Republic) H Šromová | 3 | 2
Q | (Poland) M Domachowska | 2 | 1
2 | (Slovakia) D Hantuchová | 6 | 6

Second round
7 | (Italy) F Pennetta | 6 | 6
(Uzbekistan) A Amanmuradova | 1 | 3
Q | (Russia) E Ivanova | 1 | 4
4 | (Russia) M Kirilenko | 6 | 6
8 | (Chinese Taipei) Y-j Chan | 6 | 6
(Slovakia) J Gajdošová | 1 | 2
(Russia) A Rodionova | 2 | 1
2 | (Slovakia) D Hantuchová | 6 | 6

Quarterfinals
7 | (Italy) F Pennetta | 3 | 1
4 | (Russia) M Kirilenko | 6 | 6
8 | (Chinese Taipei) Y-j Chan | 4 | 1
2 | (Slovakia) D Hantuchová | 6 | 6

Semifinals
4 | (Russia) M Kirilenko | 4 | 6 | 6
2 | (Slovakia) D Hantuchová | 6 | 2 | 1

== Qualifying ==
=== Seeds ===
1. (Romania) Sorana Cîrstea (withdrew due to playing Bali Semifinal)
2. (Russia) Ekaterina Ivanova (qualified)
3. (Australia) Monique Adamczak (qualifying competition, lucky loser)
4. (Poland) Marta Domachowska (qualified)
5. (United Kingdom) Naomi Cavaday (qualified)
6. (Indonesia) Sandy Gumulya (qualifying competition, lucky loser)
7. (United States) Neha Uberoi (qualified)
8. (United Kingdom) Sarah Borwell (qualifying competition)
9. (India) Rushmi Chakravarthi (qualifying competition)

=== Qualifiers ===
1. (United States) Neha Uberoi
2. (Russia) Ekaterina Ivanova
3. (United Kingdom) Naomi Cavaday
4. (Poland) Marta Domachowska

=== Lucky losers ===
- (Australia) Monique Adamczak
- (Indonesia) Sandy Gumulya

=== Key ===
- Q = Qualifier
- WC = Wild card
- LL = Lucky loser
- Alt = Alternate
- SE = Special exempt
- PR = Protected ranking
- ITF = ITF entry
- JE = Junior exempt
- w/o = Walkover
- r = Retired
- d = Defaulted
- SR = Special ranking

=== Draw ===
==== First qualifier ====
First round
9 | (India) Rushmi Chakravarthi | 6 | 5 | 6
(India) Ankita Bhambri | 4 | 7 | 2
(United States) Katie Ruckert | 2 | 5
7 | (United States) Neha Uberoi | 6 | 7

Qualifying competition
9 | (India) Rushmi Chakravarthi | 2 | 4
7 | (United States) Neha Uberoi | 6 | 6

==== Second qualifier ====
First round
2 | (Russia) Ekaterina Ivanova | 6 | 6
(India) Isha Lakhani | 2 | 4
(Russia) Julia Efremova | 1 | 2
6 | (Indonesia) Sandy Gumulya | 6 | 6

Qualifying competition
2 | (Russia) Ekaterina Ivanova | 6 | 4 | 6
6 | (Indonesia) Sandy Gumulya | 0 | 6 | 2

==== Third qualifier ====
First round
3 | (Australia) Monique Adamczak | 3 | 6 | 7
(Turkey) İpek Şenoğlu | 6 | 3 | 5
Alt | (India) Sanaa Bhambri | 2 | 5
5 | (United Kingdom) Naomi Cavaday | 6 | 7

Qualifying competition
3 | (Australia) Monique Adamczak | 7 | 5 | 4
5 | (United Kingdom) Naomi Cavaday | 6^{4} | 7 | 6

==== Fourth qualifier ====
First round
4 | (Poland) Marta Domachowska | 6 | 6
WC | (India) Shivika Burman | 3 | 1
WC | (India) Ashvarya Shrivastava | 0 | 4
8 | (United Kingdom) Sarah Borwell | 6 | 6

Qualifying competition
4 | (Poland) Marta Domachowska | 6 | 6
8 | (United Kingdom) Sarah Borwell | 2 | 3
