= 2006 Sunfeast Open – Singles =

Singles
- 2006 Sunfeast Open

Final
- Champion: (Switzerland) Martina Hingis
- Runner-up: (Russia) Olga Poutchkova
- Score: 6–0, 6–4

Events
Singles	Doubles
← 2005 ·	Sunfeast Open	· 2007 →

Anastasia Myskina was the defending champion, but chose not to participate that year.

Martina Hingis won the title, defeating Olga Poutchkova 6–0, 6–4 in the final.

== Seeds ==
1. (Switzerland) Martina Hingis (champion)
2. (Croatia) Karolina Šprem (first round)
3. (Ukraine) Yuliana Fedak (first round)
4. (France) Aravane Rezaï (quarterfinals)
5. (India) Sania Mirza (semifinals)
6. (Estonia) Kaia Kanepi (first round)
7. (Australia) Nicole Pratt (second round)
8. (Russia) Anastasia Rodionova (first round)

== Results ==
=== Key ===
- Q = Qualifier
- WC = Wild card
- LL = Lucky loser
- Alt = Alternate
- SE = Special exempt
- PR = Protected ranking
- ITF = ITF entry
- JE = Junior exempt
- w/o = Walkover
- r = Retired
- d = Defaulted
- SR = Special ranking

=== Finals ===
Semifinals
1	(Switzerland) Martina Hingis	6	6
5	(India) Sania Mirza	1	0
(Russia) Olga Poutchkova	6	6
Q	(Uzbekistan) Iroda Tulyaganova	4	4

Final
1	(Switzerland) Martina Hingis	6	6
(Russia) Olga Poutchkova	0	4

=== Top half ===
First round
1	(Switzerland) M Hingis	6	6
(Hungary) M Czink	1	2
(Israel) T Obziler	6	6
(Ukraine) Y Beygelzimer	2	3
(Uzbekistan) A Amanmuradova	3	4
(United States) A Spears	6	6
(Thailand) T Tanasugarn	6^{10}	7	6
6	(Estonia) K Kanepi	7^{12}	5	0
4	(France) A Rezaï	6	7^{7}
WC	(India) A Bhambri	2	6^{3}
(United Kingdom) A Keothavong	2	7^{7}	3
(Belarus) T Poutchek	6	6^{5}	6
(Germany) S Klösel	7^{7}	5	6
(Russia) G Voskoboeva	6^{5}	7	4
Q	(India) R Chakravarthi	0	4
5	(India) S Mirza	6	6

Second round
1	(Switzerland) M Hingis	6	7
(Israel) T Obziler	2	5
(United States) A Spears	6	3	2
(Thailand) T Tanasugarn	2	6	6
4	(France) A Rezaï	6	6
(Belarus) T Poutchek	1	2
(Germany) S Klösel	5	3
5	(India) S Mirza	7	6

Quarterfinals
1	(Switzerland) M Hingis	7	6
(Thailand) T Tanasugarn	5	2
4	(France) A Rezaï	4	5
5	(India) S Mirza	6	7

Semifinals
1	(Switzerland) M Hingis	6	6
5	(India) S Mirza	1	0

=== Bottom half ===
First round
7	(Australia) N Pratt	2	6	6
WC	(United States) S Rao	6	3	3
(Spain) A Parra Santonja	1	0
(Russia) O Poutchkova	6	6
(Indonesia) A Widjaja	6	6
Q	(India) S Bhambri	2	3
(Italy) A Brianti	6	6
3	(Ukraine) Y Fedak	4	2
8	(Russia) A Rodionova	6	3	3
(Russia) A Kudryavtseva	1	6	6
(Czech Republic) H Šromová	6	6
WC	(India) S Uberoi	4	3
Q	(Chinese Taipei) C-j Chuang	4	1
Q	(Uzbekistan) I Tulyaganova	6	6
(Australia) C Dellacqua	2	7^{7}	6
2	(Croatia) K Šprem	6	6^{2}	2

Second round
7	(Australia) N Pratt	2	6	2
(Russia) O Poutchkova	6	2	6
(Indonesia) A Widjaja	6^{7}	6	3
(Italy) A Brianti	7^{9}	3	6
(Russia) A Kudryavtseva	6	6
(Czech Republic) H Šromová	2	0
Q	(Uzbekistan) I Tulyaganova	6	6
(Australia) C Dellacqua	3	2

Quarterfinals
(Russia) O Poutchkova	7	6
(Italy) A Brianti	5	3
(Russia) A Kudryavtseva	6	2	2
Q	(Uzbekistan) I Tulyaganova	4	6	6

Semifinals
(Russia) O Poutchkova	6	6
Q	(Uzbekistan) I Tulyaganova	4	4

== Qualifying ==
=== Seeds ===
1. (Australia) Casey Dellacqua (moved to main draw)
2. (Chinese Taipei) Chuang Chia-jung (qualified)
3. (Netherlands) Brenda Schultz-McCarthy (first round)
4. (Uzbekistan) Iroda Tulyaganova (qualified)
5. (India) Isha Lakhani (first round)
6. (Indonesia) Sandy Gumulya (qualifying competition)
7. (India) Rushmi Chakravarthi (qualified)
8. (Germany) Sabine Lisicki (qualifying competition)
9. (India) Sandhya Nagaraj (qualifying competition)

=== Qualifiers ===
1. (India) Rushmi Chakravarthi
2. (Chinese Taipei) Chuang Chia-jung
3. (India) Sanaa Bhambri
4. (Uzbekistan) Iroda Tulyaganova

=== Key ===
- Q = Qualifier
- WC = Wild card
- LL = Lucky loser
- Alt = Alternate
- SE = Special exempt
- PR = Protected ranking
- ITF = ITF entry
- JE = Junior exempt
- w/o = Walkover
- r = Retired
- d = Defaulted
- SR = Special ranking

=== Draw ===
==== First qualifier ====
First round
5	(India) Isha Lakhani	4	2
WC	(India) Tara Iyer	6	6
(India) Sonal Phadke	4	4
7	(India) Rushmi Chakravarthi	6	6

Qualifying competition
WC	(India) Tara Iyer	5	4
7	(India) Rushmi Chakravarthi	7	6

==== Second qualifier ====
First round
2	(Chinese Taipei) Chuang Chia-jung	6	6
(India) Parul Goswami	2	1
Alt	(India) Archana Venkataraman	3	2
9	(India) Sandhya Nagaraj	6	6

Qualifying competition
2	(Chinese Taipei) Chuang Chia-jung	7^{7}	6
9	(India) Sandhya Nagaraj	6^{4}	4

==== Third qualifier ====
First round
3	(Netherlands) Brenda Schultz-McCarthy	6	3	6^{7}
(India) Sanaa Bhambri	0	6	7^{9}
WC	(India) Ragini Vimal	1	0
8	(Germany) Sabine Lisicki	6	6

Qualifying competition
(India) Sanaa Bhambri	7^{7}	7
8	(Germany) Sabine Lisicki	6^{4}	5

==== Fourth qualifier ====
First round
4/PR	(Uzbekistan) Iroda Tulyaganova	6	6
(India) Meghha Vakaria	1	0
(United States) Jennifer Elie	5	2
6	(Indonesia) Sandy Gumulya	7	6

Qualifying competition
4/PR	(Uzbekistan) Iroda Tulyaganova	6	6
6	(Indonesia) Sandy Gumulya	1	3
