= 2006 Sunfeast Open =

- Date: 18–24 September 2006
- Edition: 2nd
- Draw: 32S / 16D
- Location: Kolkata, India

Champions

Singles
- (Switzerland) Martina Hingis

Doubles
- (South Africa) Liezel Huber / (India) Sania Mirza
← 2005 ·	Sunfeast Open	· 2007 →

2006 Sunfeast Open was the second edition of the WTA tennis tournament held in Kolkata, West Bengal, India from 18 to 24 September 2006 for women's professional tennis. It was a Tier III event with the prize money of US$175,000.

== Finals ==
=== Singles ===
(Switzerland) Martina Hingis defeated (Russia) Olga Puchkova 6–0, 6–4

- It was Hingis' 2nd title of the year and 42nd of her career

=== Doubles ===
(South Africa) Liezel Huber / (India) Sania Mirza defeated (Ukraine) Yuliya Beygelzimer / (Ukraine) Yuliana Fedak, 6–4, 6–0

- It was Huber's 3rd title of the year and 15th of her career
- It was Mirza's 1st title of the year and 2nd of her career

== Entrants ==
=== Seeds ===
Country	Player	Rank^{1}	Seed
SUI	Martina Hingis	9	1
CRO	Karolina Šprem	50	2
UKR	Yuliana Fedak	64	3
FRA	Aravane Rezaï	66	4
IND	Sania Mirza	70	5
EST	Kaia Kanepi	72	6
AUS	Nicole Pratt	80	7
RUS	Anastasia Rodionova	82	8

- Rankings as of 11 September 2006.

=== Other entrants ===
The following players received wildcards into the singles main draw:

- (India) Ankita Bhambri
- (United States) Sunitha Rao
- (India) Shikha Uberoi

The following players received entry from the qualifying draw:

- (India) Sanaa Bhambri
- (India) Rushmi Chakravarthi
- (Chinese Taipei) Chuang Chia-jung
- (Uzbekistan) Iroda Tulyaganova
