= 2008 ITF Women's Circuit =

2008 women's tennis tour

Details

Achievements (singles)

The ITF Women's Circuit is the second-tier tour for women's professional tennis organised by the International Tennis Federation, and is a tier below the WTA Tour. The ITF Women's Circuit includes tournaments with prize money ranging from $10,000 up to $100,000.

The ITF world champions in 2008 were Jelena Janković (senior singles), Cara Black / Liezel Huber (senior doubles) and Noppawan Lertcheewakarn (combined junior ranking).

== Tournament breakdown by event category ==
Event category	Number of events	Total prize money
$100,000	13	$1,300,000
$75,000	17	$1,275,000
$50,000	47	$2,350,000
$25,000	121	$3,025,000
$10,000	238	$2,380,000
Total	436	$10,330,000

== Tournament breakdown by region ==
Region	Number of events	Total prize money
Africa	15	$195,000
Asia	61	$1,460,000
Central America/Caribbean	20	$405,000
Europe	253	$6,065,000
North America	45	$1,575,000
Oceania	13	$295,000
South America	29	$335,000
Total	436	$10,330,000

== Singles titles by nation ==
Rank	Nation	Titles won
1.	Russia	30
2.	Italy	28
3.	(United States) USA	27
4.	Germany	22
=	(Slovakia) Slovak Republic	22
6.	Netherlands	18
7.	Czech Republic	17
8.	Argentina	16
=	Spain	16
10.	Japan	15
=	Romania	15
12.	France	13
13.	(United Kingdom) Great Britain	12
=	Poland	12
15.	Australia	10
=	Brazil	10
17.	China	8
=	(South Korea) Korea	8
=	Ukraine	8
20.	Portugal	7
=	Slovenia	7

This list displays only the top 21 nations in terms of singles titles wins.

== See also ==
- 2008 ITF Women's Circuit (January–March)
- 2008 ITF Women's Circuit (April–June)
- 2008 ITF Women's Circuit (July–September)

== Sources ==
- List of ITF World Champions
- 2008 ITF statistics summary
- ITF pro circuit titles won by nations players in 2008
