= Lisa Whybourn =

English tennis player

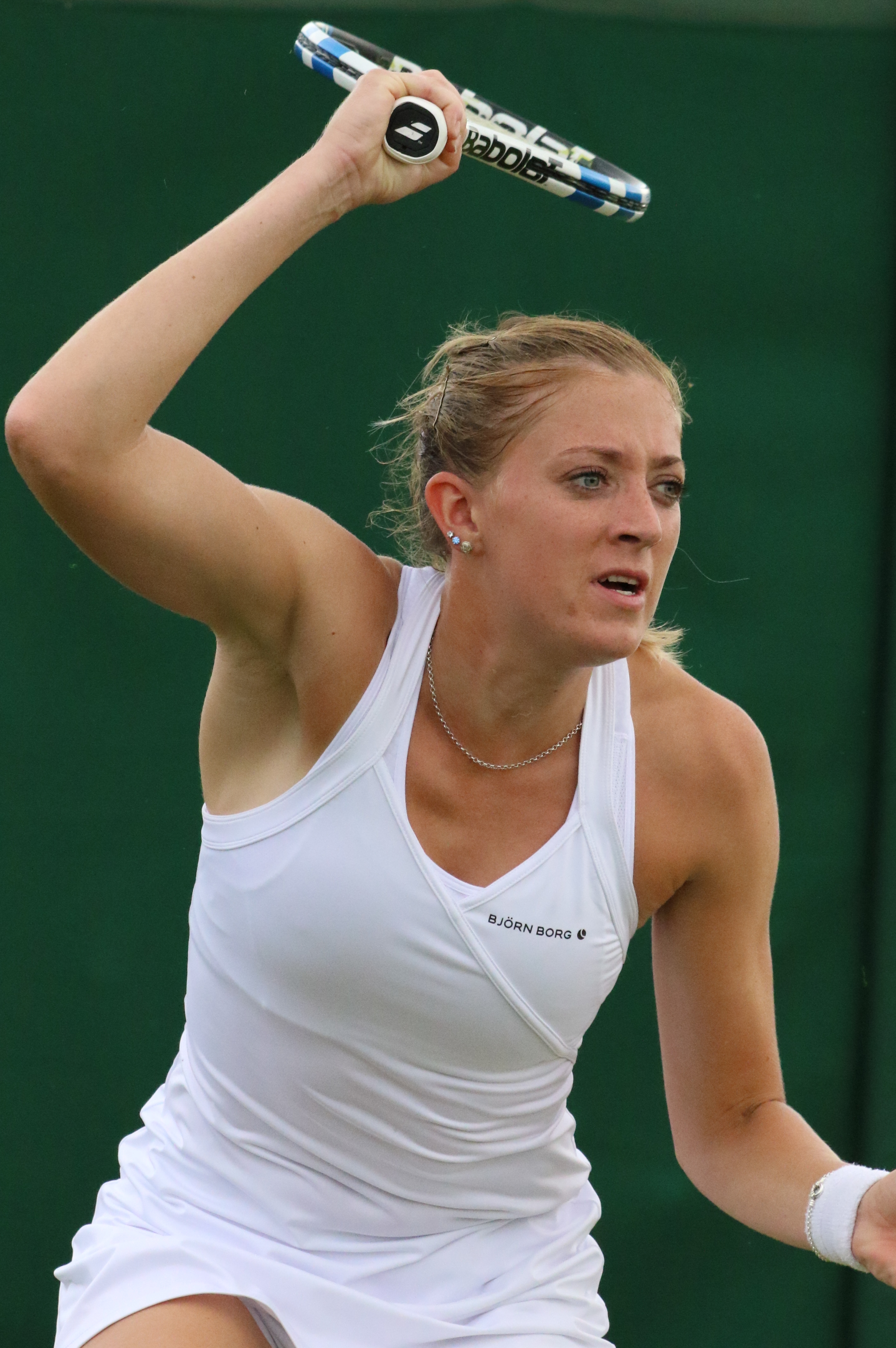
- Country (sports): United Kingdom
- Residence: Miami, Florida
- Born: 11 May 1991 (age 35) Huntingdon, England
- Retired: 2017
- Plays: Right (two-handed backhand)
- Prize money: $105,720

Singles
- Career record: 141–132
- Career titles: 0
- Highest ranking: No. 250 (6 May 2013)

Grand Slam singles results
- Wimbledon: Q3 (2010)

Doubles
- Career record: 67–63
- Career titles: 7 ITF
- Highest ranking: No. 386 (6 August 2012)

Grand Slam doubles results
- Wimbledon: 1R (2013)
Medal record
Representing England
Commonwealth Youth Games
Bronze medal – third place	2008 Pune	Women's Doubles

Lisa Whybourn (born 11 May 1991) is an English former professional tennis player.

She broke into the world top 250 in June 2010 following her run to the final qualifying round at Wimbledon. Whybourn is originally from Hemingford Grey in Huntingdon, Cambridgeshire, but is now coaching at the Hume Tennis And Community Centre in Craigieburn, Victoria.

== Tennis career ==
=== Junior years ===
Lisa played her first junior ITF tournament in April 2006 and her last in the qualifying rounds for the Wimbledon Championships in June 2009. She reached three singles finals (winning two of them), and three semifinals, during those three years. She never passed the first round of junior Wimbledon, and she did not compete in any of the other three Grand Slam junior events. Lisa managed to win two titles in doubles. She was also a doubles runner-up twice and a semifinalist twice. Whybourn amassed a singles win–loss record of 31–22, and a win–loss record of 24–20 in doubles. Her career-high combined singles and doubles ranking was world No. 177 which was achieved on 19 May 2008.

=== ITF Circuit and WTA Tour ===
Lisa first competed on the ITF Circuit in 2006, when she played in two $10k events in Britain, and she lost in the qualifying rounds for each one. She competed in three more $10k Futures in 2007 but lost in the qualifying stages, again. She then competed in a number of lower-level ITF events in 2008, and did not pass the first round in any of them.

Her first ITF semifinal came in September 2009 at the $10k event in Cumberland in London, in which she was beaten by fellow Brit Jade Windley. She followed that event by reaching the second round of the $75k tournament in Shrewsbury. She eventually lost to Elena Baltacha in straight sets. Lisa also reached the quarterfinals of a $50k event. Her very first year-end world ranking was No. 531.

Whybourn reached the semifinals of a $10k event in April 2010, and eventually reached her first ITF final later in April, in which she was beaten by Romana Tabaková. She reached the quarterfinal round of another $10k event. Whybourn received a wildcard into the qualifying draw for the Birmingham Classic, and she was beaten by Sophie Ferguson. Lisa's next wildcard chance gave to her an entry into the Wimbledon qualifying. She beat Sally Peers and Anna Floris, before being stopped in the final round by Andrea Hlaváčková. She returned to the ITF Circuit for the rest of the season. Lisa reached two more quarterfinals and one more semifinal. Her year-end ranking was No. 333. Her career-high WTA ranking was 250.

Whybourn announced her retirement from tennis in July 2017, due to an accumulation of injuries and surgeries.

== ITF Circuit finals ==
=== Singles (0–4) ===
Legend $25,000 tournaments $10,000 tournaments	Finals by surface Hard (0–3) Clay (0–1)

Result	No.	Date	Location	Surface	Opponent	Score
Loss	1.	27 April 2010	Bournemouth, UK	Clay	(Slovakia) Romana Tabak	1–6, 7–6^{(7)}, 6–7^{(4)}
Loss	2.	26 May 2012	Astana, Kazakhstan	Hard (i)	(Ukraine) Lyudmyla Kichenok	6–4, 4–6, 2–6
Loss	3.	28 April 2013	Phuket, Thailand	Hard	(Thailand) Luksika Kumkhum	0–6, 5–7
Loss	4.	1 November 2015	Sharm El Sheikh, Egypt	Hard	(United Kingdom) Emily Arbuthnott	6–3, 1–6, 7–6^{(3)}

=== Doubles (7–4) ===
Legend $25,000 tournaments $15,000 tournaments $10,000 tournaments	Finals by surface Hard (6–4) Clay (1–0) Grass (0–0)

Result	No.	Date	Tournament	Surface	Partner	Opponents	Score
Loss	1.	29 June 2010	Gausdal, Norway	Hard	(United Kingdom) Nicola George	(Denmark) Karen Barbat (United Kingdom) Mhairi Brown	2–6, 2–6
Win	1.	17 May 2011	İzmir, Turkey	Hard	(United Kingdom) Naomi Broady	(Romania) Mihaela Buzărnescu (Croatia) Tereza Mrdeža	3–6, 7–6^{(4)}, [10–7]
Win	2.	13 August 2011	Istanbul, Turkey	Hard	(Portugal) Magali de Lattre	(Bulgaria) Isabella Shinikova (Georgia (country)) Sofia Kvatsabaia	6–3, 2–6, [12–10]
Loss	2.	20 August 2011	ITF Istanbul, Turkey	Hard	(United Kingdom) Tara Moore	(India) Ashvarya Shrivastava (Germany) Christina Shakovets	3–6, 1–6
Loss	3.	20 August 2012	GB Pro-Series Glasgow, UK	Hard (i)	(United Kingdom) Alexandra Walker	(United Kingdom) Anna Fitzpatrick (United Kingdom) Samantha Murray	2–6, 3–6
Win	3.	11 March 2013	GB Pro-Series Bath, UK	Hard (i)	(Germany) Nicola Geuer	(Switzerland) Viktorija Golubic (Germany) Julia Kimmelmann	6–3, 6–4
Win	4.	24 October 2015	Sharm El Sheikh, Egypt	Hard	(United Kingdom) Emily Arbuthnott	(Chinese Taipei) Hsu Chieh-yu (Russia) Anna Morgina	6–2, 6–4
Win	5.	31 October 2015	Sharm El Sheikh, Egypt	Hard	(United Kingdom) Emily Arbuthnott	(Belgium) Vicky Geurinckx (Slovakia) Tereza Mihalíková	6–3, 6–0
Win	6.	6 November 2015	GB Pro-Series Loughborough, UK	Hard (i)	(United Kingdom) Freya Christie	(Samoa) Steffi Carruthers (Mexico) Sabastiani León	6–1, 6–2
Loss	4.	14 November 2015	GB Pro-Series Bath, UK	Hard (i)	(United Kingdom) Freya Christie	(United Kingdom) Sarah Beth Askew (United Kingdom) Olivia Nicholls	6–1, 4–6, [2–10]
Win	7.	30 April 2016	ITF Pula, Italy	Clay	(Austria) Pia König	(Italy) Marcella Cucca (Italy) Camilla Scala	1–6, 7–5, [11–9]
