= 2006 Sunfeast Open – Doubles =

Doubles
- 2006 Sunfeast Open

Final
- Champion: (South Africa) Liezel Huber (India) Sania Mirza
- Runner-up: (Ukraine) Yuliya Beygelzimer (Ukraine) Yuliana Fedak
- Score: 6–4, 6–0

Events
Singles	Doubles
← 2005 ·	Sunfeast Open	· 2007 →

Elena Likhovtseva and Anastasia Myskina were the defending champions, but neither chose to participate that year.

Liezel Huber and Sania Mirza won the title, defeating Yuliya Beygelzimer and Yuliana Fedak 6–4, 6–0 in the final.

== Seeds ==
1. (South Africa) Liezel Huber / (India) Sania Mirza (champions)
2. (Australia) Nicole Pratt / (Russia) Anastasia Rodionova (quarterfinals)
3. (Ukraine) Yuliya Beygelzimer / (Ukraine) Yuliana Fedak (final)
4. (Czech Republic) Hana Šromová / (Indonesia) Angelique Widjaja (semifinals)

== Results ==
=== Key ===
- Q = Qualifier
- WC = Wild card
- LL = Lucky loser
- Alt = Alternate
- SE = Special exempt
- PR = Protected ranking
- ITF = ITF entry
- JE = Junior exempt
- w/o = Walkover
- r = Retired
- d = Defaulted
- SR = Special ranking

=== Draw ===
First round
1	(South Africa) L Huber (India) S Mirza	6	6
WC	(India) A Venkataraman (India) R Vimal	2	4
(Chinese Taipei) C-j Chuang (Thailand) T Tanasugarn	2	6	6^{6}
(Australia) C Dellacqua (United States) S Rao	6	4	7^{8}
4	(Czech Republic) H Šromová (Indonesia) A Widjaja	6	6
(India) R Chakravarthi (Indonesia) S Gumulya	1	0
(Italy) A Brianti (United Kingdom) A Keothavong	5	5
(Russia) A Kudryavtseva (Belarus) T Poutchek	7	7
(India) A Bhambri (India) S Bhambri	1	2
(Uzbekistan) A Amanmuradova (Uzbekistan) I Tulyaganova	6	6
Q	(India) I Lakhani (India) S Nagaraj	3	5
3	(Ukraine) Y Beygelzimer (Ukraine) Y Fedak	6	7
(Hungary) M Czink (India) S Uberoi	6	7^{7}
(Germany) S Klösel (Russia) G Voskoboeva	3	6^{4}
(Spain) A Parra Santonja (United States) A Spears	4	4
2	(Australia) N Pratt (Russia) A Rodionova	6	6

Quarterfinals
1	(South Africa) L Huber (India) S Mirza	6	6
(Australia) C Dellacqua (United States) S Rao	1	4
4	(Czech Republic) H Šromová (Indonesia) A Widjaja	6	7
(Russia) A Kudryavtseva (Belarus) T Poutchek	1	5
(Uzbekistan) A Amanmuradova (Uzbekistan) I Tulyaganova	6^{6}	7	0^{r}
3	(Ukraine) Y Beygelzimer (Ukraine) Y Fedak	7^{8}	5	3
(Hungary) M Czink (India) S Uberoi	7^{8}	3	6
2	(Australia) N Pratt (Russia) A Rodionova	6^{6}	6	4

Semifinals
1	(South Africa) L Huber (India) S Mirza	6	6
4	(Czech Republic) H Šromová (Indonesia) A Widjaja	3	2
3	(Ukraine) Y Beygelzimer (Ukraine) Y Fedak	6
(Hungary) M Czink (India) S Uberoi	3	r

Final
1	(South Africa) L Huber (India) S Mirza	6	6
3	(Ukraine) Y Beygelzimer (Ukraine) Y Fedak	4	0

== Qualifying ==
=== Seeds ===
1. (India) Geeta Manohar / (India) Sonal Phadke (qualifying competition)
2. (India) Isha Lakhani / (India) Sandhya Nagaraj (qualified)

=== Qualifiers ===
- (India) Isha Lakhani / (India) Sandhya Nagaraj

=== Draw ===
Qualifying competition
1	(India) Geeta Manohar (India) Sonal Phadke	2
2	(India) Isha Lakhani (India) Sandhya Nagaraj	8
