= 2007 Sunfeast Open =

- Date: 17–23 September
- Edition: 3rd
- Category: Tier III
- Draw: 32M/16Q/16D
- Prize money: $175,000
- Surface: Hard / Indoor
- Location: Kolkata, India
- Venue: Netaji Indoor Stadium

Champions

Singles
- (Russia) Maria Kirilenko

Doubles
- (United States) Vania King / (Russia) Alla Kudryavtseva
← 2006 ·	Sunfeast Open

The 2007 Sunfeast Open was a Tier III tennis event on the 2007 WTA Tour, organised for women's professional tennis organized at Netaji Indoor Stadium, Calcutta. This was the third edition of the tournament.

== Entrants ==
=== Seeds ===
Seed	Country	Player name
1	FRA	Marion Bartoli
2	SVK	Daniela Hantuchová
3	IND	~~Sania Mirza~~
4	RUS	Maria Kirilenko
5	RUS	Alla Kudryavtseva
6	FRA	~~Alizé Cornet~~
7	ITA	Flavia Pennetta
8	TPE	Chan Yung-jan
9	RUS	Yaroslava Shvedova

=== Qualifiers ===
These players got entry from the qualifying draw.

- (United Kingdom) Naomi Cavaday
- (Russia) Ekaterina Ivanova
- (United States) Neha Uberoi
- (Poland) Marta Domachowska

==== Lucky losers ====
These players entered through the Lucky loser spot.

- (Australia) Monique Adamczak
- (Indonesia) Sandy Gumulya

=== Wildcards ===
The following players received Wildcards into the main draw.

- (United States) Sunitha Rao
- (India) Tara Iyer
- (India) Kyra Shroff

== Champions ==
=== Singles ===
(Russia) Maria Kirilenko def. (Ukraine) Mariya Koryttseva, 6–0, 6–2

=== Doubles ===
(Russia) Alla Kudryavtseva (RUS) / (United States) Vania King (US) defeated (Italy) Alberta Brianti (ITA) / (Ukraine) Mariya Koryttseva (UKR), 6–1, 6-4
