= Ashvarya Shrivastava =

Indian tennis player

- Country (sports): India
- Residence: Pune, India
- Born: 19 February 1992 (age 34) Pune
- Height: 1.60 m (5 ft 3 in)
- Turned pro: 2007
- Plays: Right-handed (two-handed backhand)
- Prize money: $7,454

Singles
- Career record: 16–34
- Career titles: 0
- Highest ranking: No. 653 (24 October 2011)

Doubles
- Career record: 15–32
- Career titles: 0 WTA, 1 ITF
- Highest ranking: No. 780 (7 November 2011)

Ashvarya Shrivastava (Aiśvaryā Śrīvāstav; born 19 February 1992) is a former professional tennis player from India. She formerly played for the India Fed Cup team. Her career-high singles ranking is No. 653, which she achieved in October 2011.

Ashvarya has been training at a college in the United States.

== Biography ==
=== 2007–2010 ===
Shrivastava played the first match of her career at the 2007 Sunfeast Open in her hometown, Pune, as a wildcard receiver, where she lost to British player Sarah Borwell in the first qualifying round. This is her only WTA Tour match played yet. In doubles, she partnered fellow Indian Kyra Shroff but also lost in the first round to Alberta Brianti and Mariya Koryttseva. She also played for the New Mexico State Aggies where she led the team throughout and won WAC Player of the Year 2015–2016.

=== 2011 ===
On 20 August 2011, Shrivastava won her first title, by winning the doubles of a $10k event in Istanbul, Turkey, partnering German player Christina Shakovets. They defeated the British pair Tara Moore and Lisa Whybourn in straight sets to pick up their title.

== ITF finals ==
=== Doubles (1–0) ===
Legend
$25,000 tournaments
$10,000 tournaments

Result	No.	Date	Tournament	Surface	Partner	Opponents	Score
Win	1.	15 August 2011	Istanbul, Turkey	Hard	(Germany) Christina Shakovets	(United Kingdom) Tara Moore (United Kingdom) Lisa Whybourn	6–1, 6–3
