= Aude Vermoezen =

Belgian tennis player

- Country (sports): Belgium
- Born: 25 July 1989 (age 35); Brussels, Belgium
- Height: 5 ft 7 in (1.70 m)
- Turned pro: 2006
- Retired: 2008
- Plays: Ambidextrous

Singles
- Highest ranking: No. 776 (24 March 2008)

Doubles
- Highest ranking: No. 698 (24 March 2008)

Aude Vermoezen (born 25 July 1989) is a Belgian former professional tennis player.

== Biography ==
An ambidextrous player from Grimbergen, Vermoezen could use both double-handed forehands and backhands. In 2005 she won a bronze medal in the girls' singles event at the European Youth Summer Olympic Festival and featured in the junior draws at Wimbledon. From 2006 she competed as a professional.

In 2007, Vermoezen was called up to Belgium's Fed Cup team for a World Group playoff tie against China in Knokke-Heist. She was an injury replacement for Kirsten Flipkens, in a Belgian side already missing their top players. Her opportunity came in the doubles, a dead rubber, which she and Debbrich Feys lost to the Chinese pairing, whose team won the tie 4–1.

Vermoezen retired due to injury in 2008.

== ITF finals ==
=== Doubles (0–2) ===
Outcome	No.	Date	Tournament	Surface	Partner	Opponents	Score
Runner-up	1.	11 February 2008	Arezzo, Italy	Clay	(Ukraine) Tetyana Arefyeva	(Italy) Giulia Gatto-Monticone (Italy) Federica Quercia	5–7, 1–6
Runner-up	2.	15 March 2008	Ramat Hasharon, Israel	Hard	(United States) Katie Ruckert	(Italy) Nicole Clerico (United States) Lena Litvak	3–6, 1–6
