= Sandhya Nagaraj =

Indian tennis player

- Country (sports): India
- Born: 30 August 1988 (age 36)
- Retired: 2009
- Plays: Right (two-handed backhand)
- Prize money: $18,407

Singles
- Career record: 63–57
- Career titles: 1 ITF
- Highest ranking: No. 511 (17 July 2006)

Doubles
- Career record: 27–32
- Career titles: 2 ITF
- Highest ranking: No. 581 (14 May 2007)

Sandhya Nagaraj (born 30 August 1988) is an Indian former professional tennis player.

Nagaraj has career-high WTA rankings of 511 in singles, achieved on 17 July 2006, and 581 in doubles, set on 14 May 2007. She won one singles and two doubles titles on the ITF Women's Circuit.

In 2006, her only WTA Tour main-draw appearance came at the Kolkata where she partnered with countrymate Isha Lakhani in the doubles event. However, they lost in the first round to Ukrainian players Yuliya Beygelzimer and Yuliana Fedak.

== ITF finals ==
Legend
$10,000 tournaments

=== Singles: 2 (1 title, 1 runner–up) ===
Result	W–L	Date	Tournament	Tier	Surface	Opponent	Score
Loss	0–1	May 2006	ITF New Delhi, India	10,000	Hard	(China) Zhao Yijing	4–6, 6–4, 5–7
Win	1–1	June 2006	ITF Lleida, Spain	10,000	Hard	(Turkey) İpek Şenoğlu	6–4, 6–2

=== Doubles: 5 (2 titles, 3 runner–ups) ===
Result	W–L	Date	Tournament	Tier	Surface	Partnering	Opponents	Score
Loss	0–1	Jun 2005	ITF Les Franqueses del Vallès, Spain	10,000	Hard	(Germany) Svenja Weidemann	(Germany) Hannah Kuervers (Germany) Justine Ozga	2–6, 2–6
Loss	0–2	Jun 2005	Pune Championships, India	10,000	Clay	(India) Parul Goswami	(India) Geeta Manohar (India) Archana Venkataraman	2–6, 6–7^{(5)}
Win	1–2	Jun 2006	ITF Les Franqueses del Vallès, Spain	10,000	Hard	(Spain) Sheila Solsona Carcasona	(Spain) Nuria Sánchez García (Spain) Astrid Waernes García	6–2, 6–3
Loss	1–3	Apr 2007	ITF Naples, Italy	10,000	Clay	(Spain) Sheila Solsona Carcasona	(Italy) Benedetta Davato (Switzerland) Lisa Sabino	1–6, 3–6
Win	2–3	Nov 2007	ITF Aurangabad, India	10,000	Clay	(Thailand) Varatchaya Wongteanchai	(India) Ankita Bhambri (India) Sanaa Bhambri	7–6^{(4)}, 7–5
