= Elisa Balsamo (tennis) =

Italian professional tennis player

- Country (sports): Italy
- Residence: Italy
- Born: 12 August 1983 (age 41); Pontedera, Italy
- Turned pro: 2001
- Plays: Right (two-handed backhand)
- Prize money: $66,549

Singles
- Career record: 227–185
- Career titles: 5 ITF
- Highest ranking: No. 329 (1 December 2008)

Doubles
- Career record: 74–67
- Career titles: 6 ITF
- Highest ranking: No. 307 (16 June 2008)

Elisa Balsamo (born 12 August 1983) is an Italian former professional tennis player.

Her highest WTA singles ranking is 329, which she achieved on 1 December 2008. Her career-high in doubles is 307, which she reached on 16 June 2008. In her career, she won five singles and six doubles titles on the ITF Circuit.

== ITF Circuit finals ==
$50,000 tournaments
$25,000 tournaments
$10,000 tournaments

=== Singles: 7 (5–2) ===
Result	No.	Date	Tournament	Surface	Opponent	Score
Loss	1.	6 April 2003	ITF Napoli, Italy	Clay	(Netherlands) Mariëlle Hoogland	2–6, 5–7
Win	2.	18 February 2007	ITF Mallorca, Spain	Clay	(Netherlands) Michelle Gerards	6–1, 1–6, 6–4
Win	3.	4 June 2007	ITF Amarante, Portugal	Hard	(Canada) Mélanie Gloria	6–3, 7–5
Loss	4.	17 June 2007	ITF Montemor-o-Novo, Portugal	Hard	(India) Tara Iyer	4–6, 6–7^{(5)}
Win	5.	3 March 2008	ITF Sabadell, Spain	Clay	(Uruguay) Estefanía Craciún	6–3, 7–5
Win	6.	17 October 2009	ITF Settimo San Pietro, Italy	Clay	(Italy) Stefania Chieppa	6–4, 6–1
Win	7.	7 March 2010	ITF Madrid, Spain	Clay	(Romania) Alexandra Cadanțu	6–1, 6–4

=== Doubles: 14 (6–8) ===
Outcome	No.	Date	Tournament	Surface	Partner	Opponents	Score
Runner-up	1.	29 September 2002	ITF Lecce, Italy	Clay	(Spain) Rosa María Andrés Rodríguez	(Romania) Andreea Ehritt-Vanc (Romania) Edina Gallovits-Hall	7–6^{(5)}, 3–6, 3–6
Runner-up	2.	13 April 2003	ITF Torre del Greco, Italy	Clay	(Italy) Debora Carmassi	(Austria) Stefanie Haidner (Italy) Giulia Meruzzi	4–6, 3–6
Runner-up	3.	28 March 2004	ITF Rome, Italy	Clay	(Italy) Giulia Meruzzi	(Italy) Alice Canepa (Italy) Emily Stellato	6–7^{(0)}, 3–6
Runner-up	4.	11 September 2005	ITF Mestre, Italy	Clay	(Italy) Emily Stellato	(Hungary) Rita Kuti-Kis (Hungary) Kira Nagy	5–7, 4–6
Winner	5.	4 June 2007	ITF Amarante, Portugal	Hard	(Italy) Valentina Sulpizio	(Spain) Carolina Gago-Fuentes (Spain) Sabina Mediano-Álvarez	4–6, 6–4, 6–4
Winner	6.	17 June 2007	ITF Montemor-o-Novo, Portugal	Hard	(Italy) Valentina Sulpizio	(Thailand) Noppawan Lertcheewakarn (Thailand) Varanya Vijuksanaboon	6–1, 6–0
Runner-up	7.	1 March 2008	ITF Sant Boi, Spain	Clay	(Italy) Valentina Sulpizio	(Argentina) Mailen Auroux (Uruguay) Estefanía Craciún	1–6, 3–6
Runner-up	8.	3 March 2008	ITF Sabadell, Spain	Clay	(Italy) Valentina Sulpizio	(Italy) Giulia Gatto-Monticone (Italy) Federica Quercia	2–6, 0–6
Winner	9.	30 March 2008	ITF Latina, Italy	Clay	(Italy) Valentina Sulpizio	(Bosnia and Herzegovina) Sandra Martinović (Germany) Kathrin Wörle-Scheller	0–6, 7–6^{(6)} [10–7]
Winner	10.	12 April 2008	ITF Antalya, Turkey	Clay	(Italy) Valentina Sulpizio	(Netherlands) Michelle Gerards (Netherlands) Marcella Koek	6–2, 6–2
Runner-up	11.	19 April 2008	ITF Antalya, Turkey	Clay	(Italy) Valentina Sulpizio	(Netherlands) Michelle Gerards (Netherlands) Marcella Koek	3–6, 4–6
Runner-up	12.	17 July 2009	ITF Rome, Italy	Clay	(Italy) Stefania Chieppa	(Argentina) María Irigoyen (Serbia) Teodora Mirčić	5–7, 2–6
Winner	13.	7 March 2010	ITF Madrid, Spain	Clay	(Italy) Valentina Sulpizio	(Russia) Marina Shamayko (Serbia) Neda Kozić	6–3, 7–6^{(3)}
Winner	14.	5 July 2010	ITF Torino, Italy	Clay	(Italy) Valentina Sulpizio	(Italy) Alice Balducci (Italy) Martina Caciotti	7–5, 6–3
