= Lena Litvak =

Ukrainian-born American tennis player

- Native name: Лєна Литвак
- Country (sports): United States
- Residence: New York, U.S.
- Born: 15 November 1988 (age 37) Ukrainian SSR, Soviet Union (now Ukraine)
- Plays: Right-handed (two-handed backhand)
- Prize money: $87,154

Singles
- Career record: 171–168
- Career titles: 1 ITF
- Highest ranking: No. 325 (6 July 2009)

Doubles
- Career record: 128–139
- Career titles: 8 ITF
- Highest ranking: No. 228 (17 September 2012)

Lena Litvak (Note: Ukrainian: Лєна Литвак, romanized: Liena Lytvak) (born November 15, 1988) is a former tennis player. In her career, she won one singles title and eight doubles titles on the ITF Women's Circuit. On 6 July 2009, Litvak reached her career-high singles ranking of 325. On 17 September 2012, she peaked at No. 228 in the doubles rankings.

== Career ==
In addition to playing tennis, Litvak attended Harvard University. There, she tried to balance college and professional tennis.

Litvak played the 2014 Washington Open, losing in the first round with Alexandra Mueller.

Her last appearance on the pro tour was in February 2015, in the qualifying draw of an ITF tournament in Michigan.

== ITF finals ==
Legend
$25,000 tournaments
$10,000 tournaments

=== Singles (1–0) ===
Outcome	No.	Date	Tournament	Surface	Opponent	Score
Winner	1.	19 June 2011	Bethany Beach, United States	Clay	(Brazil) Maria Fernanda Alves	7–6^{(7–1)}, 4–6, 6–3

=== Doubles (8–6) ===
Outcome	No.	Date	Tournament	Surface	Partner	Opponents	Score
Winner	1.	3 August 2007	Caracas, Venezuela	Hard	(South Africa) Tegan Edwards	(Colombia) Karen Castiblanco (Argentina) Manuela Esposito	6–4, 3–6, 7–6^{(7–2)}
Runner-up	1.	10 August 2007	Caracas, Venezuela	Hard	(South Africa) Tegan Edwards	(Russia) Angelina Gabueva (Venezuela) Mariana Muci	2–6, 2–6
Winner	2.	15 March 2008	Ramat Hasharon, Israel	Hard	(Italy) Nicole Clerico	(United States) Katie Ruckert (Belgium) Aude Vermoezen	6–3, 6–1
Runner-up	2.	26 April 2008	Toluca, Mexico	Hard	(Canada) Rebecca Marino	(Argentina) Augustina Lepore (Portugal) Frederica Piedade	4–6, 2–6
Winner	3.	21 June 2008	Alcobaça, Portugal	Hard	(Colombia) Paula Zabala	(Brazil) Verena Piccolo (Australia) Alison Shemon	6–4, 6–2
Runner-up	3.	20 March 2010	Irapuato, Mexico	Hard	(Russia) Natalia Ryzhonkova	(Argentina) Florencia Molinero (Argentina) María Irigoyen	7–6^{(7–3)}, 2–6, [7–10]
Runner-up	4.	16 April 2011	Caracas, Venezuela	Hard	(United States) Amanda McDowell	(Venezuela) Adriana Pérez (Colombia) Karen Castiblanco	6–7^{(10–12)}, 4–6
Winner	4.	18 June 2011	Bethany Beach, United States	Clay	(United States) Alexandra Hirsch	(Russia) Angelina Gabueva (Brazil) Maria Fernanda Alves	7–5, 3–6, [10–8]
Winner	5.	28 August 2011	San Luis Potosí, Mexico	Hard	(Russia) Nika Kukharchuk	(Argentina) Andrea Benítez (United States) Margaret Lumia	6–1, 6–4
Winner	6.	20 July 2013	Challenger de Granby, Canada	Hard	(Canada) Carol Zhao	(France) Julie Coin (United Kingdom) Emily Webley-Smith	7–5, 6–4
Winner	7.	21 June 2014	Bethany Beach, United States	Clay	(United States) Alexandra Mueller	(United States) Rima Asatrian (United States) Katerina Stewart	6–4, 6–1
Winner	8.	28 June 2014	Charlotte, United States	Clay	(United States) Alexandra Mueller	(United States) Sophie Chang (United States) Andie Daniell	6–3, 6–3
Runner-up	5.	10 August 2014	Landisville, United States	Hard	(United States) Alexandra Mueller	(United States) Jamie Loeb (United States) Sanaz Marand	6–7^{(5–7)}, 1–6
Runner-up	6.	24 January 2015	Saint Martin, France	Hard	(Canada) Sonja Molnar	(United States) Alexa Guarachi (Japan) Ayaka Okuno	5–7, 3–6
