= Tara Iyer =

Indian tennis player

- Country (sports): India
- Born: Hyderabad, India
- Turned pro: 2003
- Plays: Right-handed (two-handed backhand)

Singles
- Career record: 61–43
- Career titles: 4 ITF
- Highest ranking: No. 350 (10 September 2007)

Doubles
- Career record: 25–21
- Career titles: 1 ITF
- Highest ranking: No. 304 (18 February 2008)

Tara Iyer is an Indian former professional tennis player. She won four ITF singles titles and one doubles title.

== Personal life ==
Tara Iyer was born in the Indian metropolis of Hyderabad. Her mother is noted IRS officer, Indira Iyer and father is Parmeshwaran Iyer, an IAS officer.

== Career ==
=== 2003-2010 ===
Iyer played at the 2006 Sunfeast Open – Singles qualifying where she won in the first round against Isha Lakhani 6–4, 6–2, before losing to Rushmi Chakravarthi 5–7, 4–6.

Iyer got a wildcard to play at the 2007 Bangalore Open where she lost to Dominika Cibulková 0–6, 2–6 in round one.

Iyer also played for India Fed Cup team in the 2007 Fed Cup Asia/Oceania Zone when she beat Sahar Al Disi of Jordan, 6–0, 6–0, but lost to Albina Khabibulina of Uzbekistan, 4–6, 6–7^{(3)}.

She received another wildcard to play at the 2007 Sunfeast Open where she lost her first-round match against Flavia Pennetta, 3–6, 1–6.

=== 2011 ===
Iyer played at the 2011 Citi Open – Singles qualifying, also as a wildcard, against Līga Dekmeijere in the first round and lost 6–7^{(4)}, 2–6.

== ITF Circuit finals ==
$100,000 tournaments
$75,000 tournaments
$50,000 tournaments
$25,000 tournaments
$10,000 tournaments

=== Singles (4–0) ===
Result	No.	Date	Tournament	Surface	Opponent	Score
Win	1.	17 June 2007	Montemor-o-Novo, Portugal	Hard	(Italy) Elisa Balsamo	6–4, 7–6^{(7–5)}
Win	2.	11 August 2007	Wrexham, United Kingdom	Hard	(Germany) Laura Haberkorn	6–0, 6–1
Win	3.	25 August 2007	Noida, India	Carpet	(India) Ankita Bhambri	3–6, 6–4, 6–3
Win	4.	1 September 2007	New Delhi, India	Hard	(South Korea) Chae Kyung-yee	7–5, 6–2

=== Doubles (1–2) ===
Result	No.	Date	Tournament	Surface	Partner	Opponents	Score
Loss	1.	30 October 2006	Ahmedabad, India	Hard	(India) Meghha Vakaria	(India) Sanaa Bhambri (India) Rushmi Chakravarthi	2–6, 4–6
Loss	2.	10 August 2007	Wrexham, United Kingdom	Hard	(United Kingdom) Katharina Brown	(Italy) Nicole Clerico (Italy) Verdiana Verardi	4–6, 3–6
Win	3.	31 August 2007	New Delhi, India	Hard	(Thailand) Nungnadda Wannasuk	(Thailand) Sophia Mulsap (Thailand) Varatchaya Wongteanchai	6–4, 6–3
