= Kyra Shroff =

Indian tennis player

- Country (sports): India
- Born: 17 October 1992 (age 33) Mumbai, India
- Turned pro: 2010
- Plays: Right (two-handed backhand)
- Prize money: $33,467

Singles
- Career record: 95–105
- Highest ranking: No. 470 (4 March 2013)

Doubles
- Career record: 117–83
- Career titles: 10 ITF
- Highest ranking: No. 358 (30 January 2017)

Team competitions
- Fed Cup: 0–2

Kyra Shroff (born 17 October 1992) is an Indian former professional tennis player.

She has career-high WTA rankings of 470 in singles, achieved on 4 March 2013, and 358 in doubles, reached on 30 January 2017. Shroff won ten ITF doubles titles.

She made her WTA Tour main-draw singles debut at the 2007 Sunfeast Open where she was given a wildcard.

Playing for the India Fed Cup team, Shroff has a win–loss record of 0–2.

== ITF Circuit finals ==
Legend
$25,000 tournaments
$15,000 tournaments
$10,000 tournaments

=== Singles: 1 (runner-up) ===
Result	No.	Date	Tournament	Surface	Opponent	Score
Loss	1	Jun 2016	ITF Grand-Baie, Mauritius	Hard	(France) Estelle Cascino	6–3, 1–6, 3–6

=== Doubles: 22 (10 titles, 12 runner-ups) ===
Result	No.	Date	Tournament	Surface	Partner	Opponents	Score
Win	1	Mar 2011	ITF New Delhi, India	Hard	(Slovenia) Anja Prislan	(Austria) Stephanie Hirsch (Austria) Yvonne Neuwirth	6–3, 7–5
Win	2	Apr 2011	ITF Lucknow, India	Grass	(Slovenia) Anja Prislan	(India) Aishwarya Agrawal (India) Ankita Raina	6–3, 6–3
Loss	1	Aug 2011	ITF São Paulo, Brazil	Clay	(Paraguay) Isabella Robbiani	(Brazil) Carla Forte (Brazil) Beatriz Haddad Maia	7–6^{(5)}, 3–6, [7–10]
Loss	2	Mar 2012	ITF Mumbai, India	Hard	(Slovenia) Anja Prislan	(Thailand) Peangtarn Plipuech (Thailand) Varunya Wongteanchai	1–6, 2–6
Loss	3	Apr 2012	ITF Fujairah, United Arab Emirates	Hard	(Oman) Fatma Al-Nabhani	(Russia) Yana Sizikova (Germany) Anna Zaja	4–6, 1–6
Win	3	Apr 2012	ITF Muscat, Oman	Hard	(Russia) Yana Sizikova	(Austria) Barbara Haas (France) Laëtitia Sarrazi	6–2, 6–4
Win	4	Dec 2012	ITF Kolkata, India	Hard	(India) Arantxa Andrady	(India) Rutuja Bhosale (India) Rishika Sunkara	6–4, 6–4
Win	5	Jun 2013	ITF Sharm El Sheikh, Egypt	Hard	(Belarus) Lidziya Marozava	(Russia) Alina Mikheeva (Poland) Sylwia Zagórska	6–4, 6–2
Loss	4	Jun 2013	ITF Sharm El Sheikh	Hard	(Slovenia) Dalila Jakupović	(India) Sowjanya Bavisetti (Russia) Anna Morgina	1–6, 6–3, [6–10]
Loss	5	Oct 2015	ITF Port El Kantaoui, Tunisia	Hard	(Belgium) Sofie Oyen	(Bosnia and Herzegovina) Jelena Simić (Ukraine) Valeriya Strakhova	3–6, 4–6
Win	6	Oct 2015	ITF Port El Kantaoui	Hard	(Romania) Daiana Negreanu	(Sweden) Mathilda Malm (United Kingdom) Mirabelle Njoze	6–2, 6–4
Loss	6	Nov 2015	ITF Port El Kantaoui	Hard	(Romania) Daiana Negreanu	(Poland) Patrycja Polańska (Czech Republic) Anna Slováková	3–6, 6–2, [8–10]
Loss	7	Feb 2016	ITF Antalya, Turkey	Clay	(Romania) Daiana Negreanu	(Hungary) Ágnes Bukta (Austria) Julia Grabher	3–6, 4–6
Win	7	May 2016	ITF Antalya, Turkey	Hard	(India) Dhruthi Tatachar Venugopal	(Slovenia) Nastja Kolar (United Kingdom) Francesca Stephenson	6–3, 5–7, [10–1]
Loss	8	Jun 2016	ITF Réunion, France	Hard	(India) Dhruthi Tatachar Venugopal	(France) Pauline Payet (India) Snehadevi Reddy	4–6, 6–2, [6–10]
Win	8	Jun 2016	ITF Grand-Baie, Mauritius	Hard	(India) Dhruthi Tatachar Venugopal	(Netherlands) Chayenne Ewijk (Netherlands) Rosalie van der Hoek	6–1, 6–1
Loss	9	Jun 2016	ITF Grand-Baie, Mauritius	Hard	(India) Dhruthi Tatachar Venugopal	(Netherlands) Chayenne Ewijk (Netherlands) Rosalie van der Hoek	3–6, 3–6
Win	9	Aug 2016	ITF Sezze, Italy	Clay	(France) Estelle Cascino	(Italy) Beatrice Lombardo (France) Carla Touly	6–2, 6–2
Loss	10	Oct 2016	ITF Chișinău, Moldova	Clay	(France) Estelle Cascino	(Ukraine) Veronika Kapshay (Ukraine) Angelina Shakhraychuk	3–6, 6–3, [4–10]
Loss	11	Oct 2016	Lagos Open, Nigeria	Hard	(India) Dhruthi Tatachar Venugopal	(Greece) Valentini Grammatikopoulou (India) Prarthana Thombare	7–6^{(3)}, 3–6, [9–11]
Win	10	Jun 2017	ITF Tel Aviv, Israel	Hard	(France) Estelle Cascino	(Sweden) Linnéa Malmqvist (Australia) Alexandra Walters	6–2, 6–4
Loss	12	Apr 2018	ITF Shymkent, Kazakhstan	Hard	(India) Pranjala Yadlapalli	(Russia) Daria Kruzhkova (Russia) Valeriya Pogrebnyak	3–6, 7–5, [5–10]
