= Yuliana Fedak =

Ukrainian tennis player (born 1983)

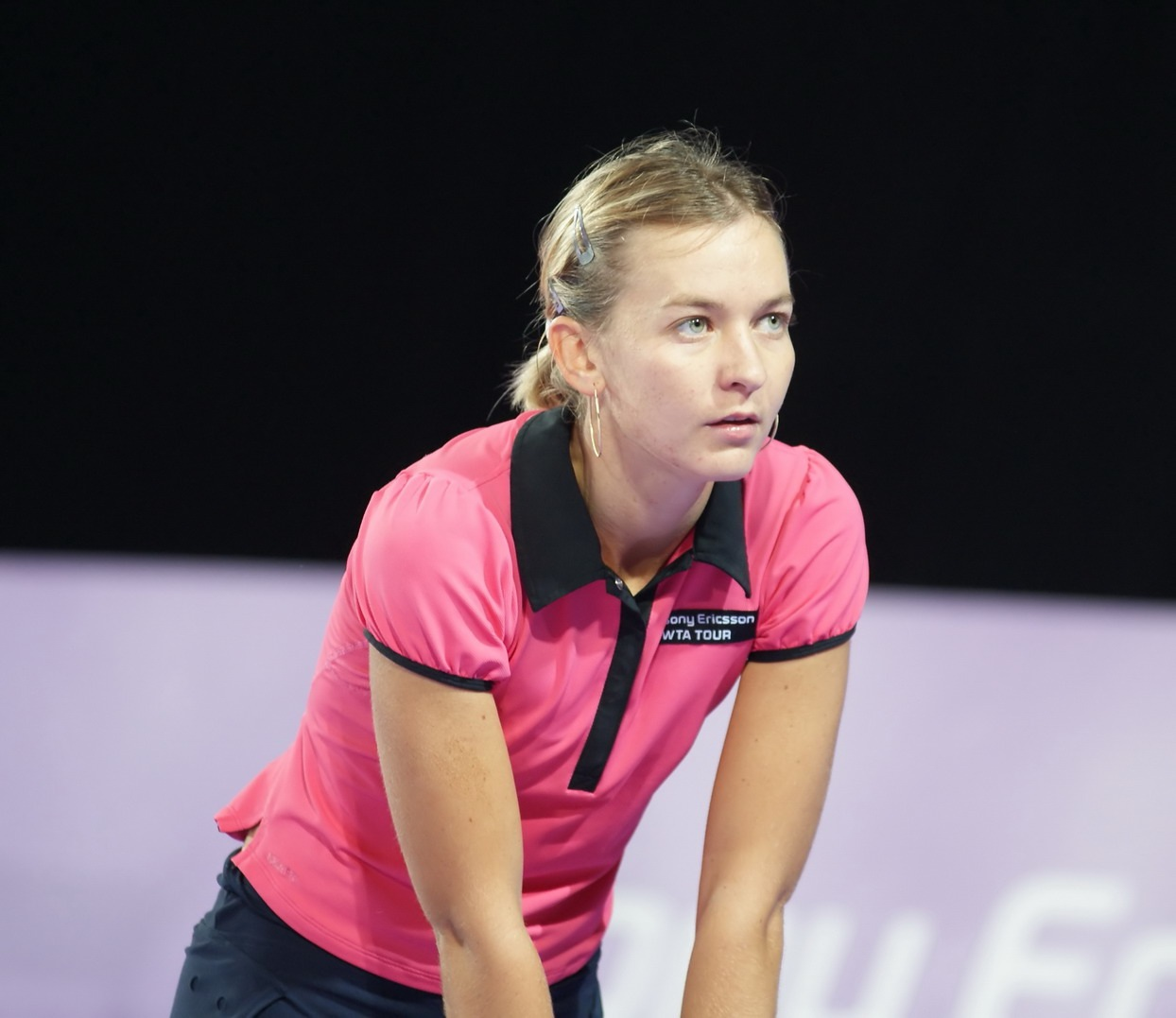
- Full name: Yuliana Leonidivna Fedak
- Native name: Юліана Федак
- Country (sports): Ukraine
- Residence: Kharkiv, Ukraine
- Born: 8 June 1983 (age 43) Nova Kakhovka, Soviet Union
- Height: 1.66 m (5 ft 5 in)
- Turned pro: 1998
- Retired: 2011
- Plays: Right (two-handed backhand)
- Prize money: $820,186

Singles
- Career record: 315–262
- Career titles: 0 WTA, 6 ITF
- Highest ranking: No. 63 (18 September 2006)

Grand Slam singles results
- Australian Open: 2R (2004)
- French Open: 2R (2004, 2006)
- Wimbledon: 1R (2005, 2006)
- US Open: 2R (2006)

Doubles
- Career record: 164–177
- Career titles: 0 WTA, 11 ITF
- Highest ranking: No. 34 (15 January 2007)

Grand Slam doubles results
- Australian Open: 1R (2005, 2007)
- French Open: 3R (2006)
- Wimbledon: SF (2006)
- US Open: 1R (2006, 2007)

Yuliana Leonidivna Fedak (Ukrainian: Юліана Леонідівна Федак; born 8 June 1983) is a Ukrainian former tennis player.

Fedak has a career-high singles ranking of world No. 63, attained on 18 September 2006, and a career-high WTA doubles ranking of 34, achieved on 15 January 2007. She won six singles titles and eleven doubles titles on the ITF Women's Circuit.

Fedak retired from tennis in 2011.

== Tennis career ==
Fedak partnered Ukrainian Alona Bondarenko in women's doubles at Roland Garros. They lost in the third round to Květa Peschke and Francesca Schiavone.

She partnered with fellow Ukrainian Tatiana Perebiynis for the qualifying event of women's doubles at Wimbledon. The pair qualified for the main draw and reached the semifinals but lost to Paola Suárez and Virginia Ruano Pascual.

== WTA Tour finals ==
=== Doubles: 2 (runner-ups) ===
Legend: Before 2009	Legend: Starting in 2009
Grand Slam tournaments
Tier I	Premier Mandatory
Tier II	Premier 5
Tier III (0–1)	Premier (0–0)
Tier IV & V (0–0)	International (0–1)

Result	Date	Tournament	Surface	Partner	Opponents	Score
Loss	Sep 2006	Kolkata, India	Hard	(Ukraine) Yuliya Beygelzimer	(South Africa) Liezel Huber (India) Sania Mirza	4–6, 0–6
Loss	Feb 2009	Memphis, United States	Hard (i)	(Netherlands) Michaëlla Krajicek	(Belarus) Victoria Azarenka (Denmark) Caroline Wozniacki	1–6, 6–7^{(2–7)}

== ITF finals ==
Legend
$75,000 tournaments
$50,000 tournaments
$25,000 tournaments
$10,000 tournaments

=== Singles (6–2) ===
Result	No.	Date	Tournament	Surface	Opponent	Score
Win	1.	21 October 2001	Cairo, Egypt	Clay	(Russia) Gulnara Fattakhetdinova	7–6^{(4)}, 6–4
Loss	1.	4 February 2002	Monterrey, Mexico	Hard	(Hungary) Melinda Czink	3–6, 6–3, 1–6
Win	2.	8 August 2004	Rimini, Italy	Clay	(Czech Republic) Kateřina Böhmová	6–4, 6–3
Win	3.	15 November 2005	Tucson, United States	Hard	(United States) Vania King	7–5, 6–0
Win	4.	18 April 2006	Dothan, United States	Clay	(United States) Varvara Lepchenko	4–6, 6–4, 6–2
Win	5.	25 April 2006	Lafayette, United States	Clay	(Venezuela) Milagros Sequera	5–7, 6–2, 6–4
Win	6.	6 April 2009	Jackson, United States	Clay	(Germany) Laura Siegemund	6–2, 6–1
Loss	2.	13 April 2009	Osprey, United States	Clay	(Canada) Sharon Fichman	4–6, 1–6

=== Doubles (11–10) ===
Result	No.	Date	Tournament	Surface	Partner	Opponents	Score
Win	1.	19 August 2001	Bucharest, Romania	Clay	(Ukraine) Olena Antypina	(Ukraine) Yevgenia Savranska (Kazakhstan) Galina Voskoboeva	4–6, 6–1, 6–4
Win	2.	2 September 2001	Bucharest, Romania	Clay	(Kazakhstan) Galina Voskoboeva	(Romania) Adriana Burz (Serbia) Sanja Todorović	6–4, 6–0
Loss	1.	10 September 2001	Sofia, Bulgaria	Clay	(Ukraine) Olena Antypina	(Czech Republic) Olga Vymetálková (Czech Republic) Magdalena Zděnovcová	3–6, 3–6
Loss	2.	15 October 2001	Giza, Egypt	Clay	(Ukraine) Olena Antypina	(Austria) Daniela Klemenschits (Austria) Sandra Klemenschits	4–6, 3–6
Win	3.	20 July 2002	Modena, Italy	Clay	(Russia) Galina Fokina	(Argentina) Gisela Dulko (Spain) Conchita Martínez Granados	6–1, 6–3
Win	4.	14 June 2003	Marseille, France	Clay	(Russia) Galina Fokina	(Romania) Andreea Ehritt-Vanc (Czech Republic) Renata Voráčová	6–4, 6–7^{(3)}, 6–3
Loss	3.	8 September 2003	Turin, Italy	Clay	(Ukraine) Olga Lazarchuk	(Bosnia and Herzegovina) Mervana Jugić-Salkić (Croatia) Darija Jurak	4–6, 2–6
Loss	4.	4 July 2004	Orbetello, Italy	Clay	(Romania) Andreea Ehritt-Vanc	(Ukraine) Alona Bondarenko (Russia) Galina Fokina	7–6^{(5)}, 2–6, 5–7
Win	5.	2 August 2004	Rimini, Italy	Clay	(Ukraine) Mariya Koryttseva	(Spain) Rosa María Andrés Rodríguez (Romania) Andreea Ehritt-Vanc	7–6^{(7)}, 6–3
Win	6.	13 September 2004	Denain, France	Clay	(Germany) Anna-Lena Grönefeld	(Bulgaria) Lubomira Bacheva (Czech Republic) Michaela Paštiková	1–6, 6–1, 6–2
Loss	5.	25 April 2006	Lafayette, United States	Clay	(Czech Republic) Eva Hrdinová	(Venezuela) Milagros Sequera (Czech Republic) Hana Šromová	6–2, 1–6, 1–6
Win	7.	18 November 2006	Deauville, France	Clay (i)	(Ukraine) Yuliya Beygelzimer	(Italy) Silvia Disderi (Israel) Tzipora Obziler	7–5, 6–4
Win	8.	26 November 2006	Poitiers, France	Hard (i)	(Ukraine) Yuliya Beygelzimer	(Belarus) Darya Kustova (Belarus) Tatiana Poutchek	7–5, 6–3
Loss	6.	14 December 2007	Dubai, United Arab Emirates	Hard	(Russia) Anna Lapushchenkova	(New Zealand) Marina Erakovic (Romania) Monica Niculescu	6–7, 4–6
Win	9.	31 October 2008	Nantes, France	Hard (i)	(Belarus) Ekaterina Dzehalevich	(Croatia) Darija Jurak (Slovenia) Maša Zec Peškirič	6–3, 6–4
Win	10.	8 August 2009	Astana, Kazakhstan	Hard	(Belarus) Darya Kustova	(Russia) Nina Bratchikova (Romania) Ágnes Szatmári	6–4, 7–5
Loss	7.	9 October 2009	Jounieh, Lebanon	Clay	(Belarus) Ekaterina Dzehalevich	(Ukraine) Mariya Koryttseva (Belarus) Darya Kustova	3–6, 4–6
Win	11.	12 June 2010	Campobasso, Italy	Clay	(Ukraine) Anastasiya Vasylyeva	(Argentina) María Irigoyen (France) Laura Thorpe	2–6, 6–3, [10–6]
Loss	8.	6 August 2010	Astana, Kazakhstan	Hard	(Ukraine) Anastasiya Vasylyeva	(Russia) Nina Bratchikova (Russia) Ekaterina Lopes	4–6, 4–6
Loss	9.	1 November 2010	Ismaning, Germany	Carpet	(Ukraine) Tetyana Arefyeva	(Germany) Kristina Barrois (Germany) Anna-Lena Grönefeld	1–6, 6–7
Loss	10.	6 December 2010	Dubai, United Arab Emirates	Hard	(Ukraine) Tetyana Arefyeva	(Russia) Elena Chalova (Kyrgyzstan) Ksenia Palkina	2–6, 4–6

== Grand Slam performance timelines ==
Key
W	F	SF	QF	#R	RR	Q#	DNQ	A	NH

(W) winner; (F) finalist; (SF) semifinalist; (QF) quarterfinalist; (#R) rounds 4, 3, 2, 1; (RR) round-robin stage; (Q#) qualification round; (DNQ) did not qualify; (A) absent; (NH) not held; (SR) strike rate (events won / competed); (W–L) win–loss record.

=== Singles ===
Tournament	2004	2005	2006	2007	2008	2009	2010
Australian Open	2R	1R	1R	1R	A	A	1R
French Open	2R	1R	2R	1R	1R	A	A
Wimbledon	A	1R	1R	A	A	A	A
US Open	A	1R	2R	A	A	A	A

=== Doubles ===
Tournament	2005	2006	2007	2008	2009
Australian Open	1R	A	1R	A	A
French Open	2R	3R	1R	A	A
Wimbledon	1R	SF	1R	A	1R
US Open	A	1R	1R	A	A
