= 2006 French Open – Women's singles qualifying =

Women's singles qualifying
- 2006 French Open

Events
Singles	men	women		boys	girls
Doubles	men	women	mixed	boys	girls
WC Singles	men	women	quad
WC Doubles	men	women	quad
Legends	−45	45+	women

Qualification
Singles	men	women
- French Open

This article displays the qualifying draw for the Women's Singles at the 2006 French Open.

== Seeds ==
1. (Italy) Romina Oprandi (qualifying competition)
2. (Czech Republic) Eva Birnerová (qualified)
3. (Germany) Sandra Klösel (qualified)
4. (Croatia) Ivana Lisjak (moved to main draw)
5. (Belarus) Victoria Azarenka (qualified)
6. (United States) Lilia Osterloh (first round)
7. (Chinese Taipei) Hsieh Su-wei (qualified)
8. (United States) Meilen Tu (first round)
9. (Luxembourg) Anne Kremer (second round)
10. (Argentina) María Emilia Salerni (first round)
11. (Russia) Vasilisa Bardina (first round)
12. (Austria) Yvonne Meusburger (first round)
13. (Slovakia) Henrieta Nagyová (first round)
14. (Russia) Galina Voskoboeva (qualified)
15. (Belarus) Tatiana Poutchek (second round)
16. (Israel) Tzipora Obziler (first round)
17. (Ukraine) Julia Vakulenko (qualified)
18. (Venezuela) Milagros Sequera (second round)
19. (Russia) Lioudmila Skavronskaia (qualifying competition)
20. (Ukraine) Yuliya Beygelzimer (qualified)
21. (Australia) Nicole Pratt (second round)
22. (Russia) Olga Puchkova (second round)
23. (France) Aravane Rezaï (qualified)
24. (Netherlands) Elise Tamaëla (first round)
25. (Portugal) Frederica Piedade (first round)

== Qualifiers ==
1. (Ukraine) Julia Vakulenko
2. (Czech Republic) Eva Birnerová
3. (Germany) Sandra Klösel
4. (Argentina) Clarisa Fernández
5. (Belarus) Victoria Azarenka
6. (Italy) Alberta Brianti
7. (Chinese Taipei) Hsieh Su-wei
8. (Romania) Anda Perianu
9. (France) Virginie Pichet
10. (Russia) Galina Voskoboeva
11. (France) Aravane Rezaï
12. (Ukraine) Yuliya Beygelzimer

== Lucky loser ==
1. (Belgium) Kirsten Flipkens

== Qualifying draw ==
Key

- Q = Qualifier
- WC = Wild card
- LL = Lucky loser
- Alt = Alternate
- ITF = ITF entry
- PR = Protected ranking
- SR = Special ranking
- SE = Special exempt
- JE = Junior exempt
- JR = Junior Accelerator Programme entrant
- CO = College Accelerator Programme entrant
- NG = Next Gen Accelerator Program entrant
- w/o = Walkover
- r = Retired
- d = Defaulted

=== First qualifier ===
First round
1	(Italy) Romina Oprandi	3	6	6
(Chinese Taipei) Chan Yung-jan	6	4	1
(United States) Ahsha Rolle	6^{5}	6	8
(United States) Tiffany Dabek	7^{7}	1	6
(Estonia) Margit Rüütel	5	4
PR	(China) Li Ting	7	6
(Slovakia) Ľudmila Cervanová	2^{r}
17	(Ukraine) Julia Vakulenko	3

Second round
1	(Italy) Romina Oprandi	6	6
(United States) Ahsha Rolle	3	1
PR	(China) Li Ting	4	1
17	(Ukraine) Julia Vakulenko	6	6

Qualifying competition
1	(Italy) Romina Oprandi	2	6	3
17	(Ukraine) Julia Vakulenko	6	2	6

=== Second qualifier ===
First round
2	(Czech Republic) Eva Birnerová	4	6	6
(Australia) Sophie Ferguson	6	3	2
(Serbia and Montenegro) Ana Timotić	4	6	1
PR	(France) Capucine Rousseau	6	3	6
(Brazil) Maria Fernanda Alves	6^{6}	6^{2}
(United States) Jessica Kirkland	7^{8}	7^{7}
(Canada) Stéphanie Dubois	6	0	2
19	(Russia) Lioudmila Skavronskaia	3	6	6

Second round
2	(Czech Republic) Eva Birnerová	6	6
PR	(France) Capucine Rousseau	2	2
(United States) Jessica Kirkland	6^{6}	1
19	(Russia) Lioudmila Skavronskaia	7^{8}	6

Qualifying competition
2	(Czech Republic) Eva Birnerová	7	6
19	(Russia) Lioudmila Skavronskaia	5	3

=== Third qualifier ===
First round
3	(Germany) Sandra Klösel	6	6
WC	(France) Irena Pavlovic	4	0
(Czech Republic) Olga Blahotová	3	2
(Chinese Taipei) Chan Chin-wei	6	6
(Germany) Kristina Barrois	6	6
(Uzbekistan) Akgul Amanmuradova	2	4
(Germany) Kathrin Wörle	6	6
13	(Slovakia) Henrieta Nagyová	1	2

Second round
3	(Germany) Sandra Klösel	6	6
(Chinese Taipei) Chan Chin-wei	1	2
(Germany) Kristina Barrois	2	1
(Germany) Kathrin Wörle	6	6

Qualifying competition
3	(Germany) Sandra Klösel	6	6
(Germany) Kathrin Wörle	3	3

=== Fourth qualifier ===
First round
25	(Portugal) Frederica Piedade	3	6	6
WC	(France) Florence Haring	6	4	8
(Italy) Valentina Sassi	4	3
(Argentina) Clarisa Fernández	6	6
(Czech Republic) Lucie Hradecká	6	6
(United Kingdom) Anne Keothavong	4	2
(Ukraine) Olena Schmelzer	3	3
22	(Russia) Olga Puchkova	6	6

Second round
WC	(France) Florence Haring	2	1
(Argentina) Clarisa Fernández	6	6
(Czech Republic) Lucie Hradecká	6	6
22	(Russia) Olga Puchkova	2	2

Qualifying competition
(Argentina) Clarisa Fernández	6^{5}	6	9
(Czech Republic) Lucie Hradecká	7^{7}	4	7

=== Fifth qualifier ===
First round
5	(Belarus) Victoria Azarenka	5	6	6
(Bosnia and Herzegovina) Mervana Jugić-Salkić	7	3	3
(Slovakia) Zuzana Kučová	2	5
(United States) Carly Gullickson	6	7
(Czech Republic) Michaela Paštiková	6	6
PR	(Czech Republic) Magdalena Zděnovcová	3	1
(Poland) Joanna Sakowicz	6	6
16	(Israel) Tzipora Obziler	3	2

Second round
5	(Belarus) Victoria Azarenka	6	6
(United States) Carly Gullickson	4	4
(Czech Republic) Michaela Paštiková	1	4
(Poland) Joanna Sakowicz	6	6

Qualifying competition
5	(Belarus) Victoria Azarenka	3	6	6
(Poland) Joanna Sakowicz	6	3	0

=== Sixth qualifier ===
First round
6	(United States) Lilia Osterloh	4	5
(Italy) Alberta Brianti	6	7
(Canada) Aleksandra Wozniak	6	6^{6}	9
(Hungary) Kira Nagy	1	7^{8}	7
(Israel) Yevgenia Savranska	6^{7}	6	6
(United Kingdom) Elena Baltacha	7^{9}	2	2
(Croatia) Ivana Abramovic	6	0	1
18	(Venezuela) Milagros Sequera	2	6	6

Second round
(Italy) Alberta Brianti	6	6
(Canada) Aleksandra Wozniak	1	3
(Israel) Yevgenia Savranska	2
18	(Venezuela) Milagros Sequera	2^{r}

Qualifying competition
(Italy) Alberta Brianti	1	6	6
(Israel) Yevgenia Savranska	6	4	3

=== Seventh qualifier ===
First round
7	(Chinese Taipei) Hsieh Su-wei	6	6
WC	(United States) Jamie Hampton	4	3
(Germany) Vanessa Henke	6	2	12
(Russia) Alla Kudryavtseva	3	6	10
(Russia) Yaroslava Shvedova	5	4
(Sweden) Hanna Nooni	7	6
WC	(France) Julie Coin	2	2
21	(Australia) Nicole Pratt	6	6

Second round
7	(Chinese Taipei) Hsieh Su-wei	6	6
(Germany) Vanessa Henke	4	1
(Sweden) Hanna Nooni	6	4	6
21	(Australia) Nicole Pratt	2	6	3

Qualifying competition
7	(Chinese Taipei) Hsieh Su-wei	6	6
(Sweden) Hanna Nooni	0	1

=== Eighth qualifier ===
First round
8	(United States) Meilen Tu	6	4	4
(Romania) Anda Perianu	3	6	6
(Japan) Miho Saeki	5	6^{4}
(Czech Republic) Petra Cetkovská	7	7^{7}
(United States) Sunitha Rao	6	6
(Luxembourg) Claudine Schaul	3	3
(Romania) Edina Gallovits	1	7	6
24	(Netherlands) Elise Tamaëla	6	5	4

Second round
(Romania) Anda Perianu	6	6
(Czech Republic) Petra Cetkovská	3	1
(United States) Sunitha Rao	4	6	4
(Romania) Edina Gallovits	6	4	6

Qualifying competition
(Romania) Anda Perianu	3	6	6
(Romania) Edina Gallovits	6	1	4

=== Ninth qualifier ===
First round
9	(Luxembourg) Anne Kremer	6	6
(Russia) Tatiana Panova	1	1
(France) Virginie Pichet	7	7^{7}
(Argentina) Natalia Gussoni	5	6^{4}
(Belgium) Kirsten Flipkens	6	6
(Czech Republic) Sandra Záhlavová	1	3
Alt	(Slovakia) Dominika Nociarová	4	6	4
15	(Belarus) Tatiana Poutchek	6	1	6

Second round
9	(Luxembourg) Anne Kremer	3	0
(France) Virginie Pichet	6	6
(Belgium) Kirsten Flipkens	6	6
15	(Belarus) Tatiana Poutchek	2	0

Qualifying competition
(France) Virginie Pichet	5	6	8
(Belgium) Kirsten Flipkens	7	2	6

=== Tenth qualifier ===
First round
10	(Argentina) María Emilia Salerni	6	2	5
(South Africa) Natalie Grandin	4	6	7
(New Zealand) Marina Erakovic	6	6
(Japan) Shiho Hisamatsu	3	2
(Argentina) María José Argeri	6	2	1
(India) Shikha Uberoi	2	6	6
WC	(France) Diana Brunel	1	4
14	(Russia) Galina Voskoboeva	6	6

Second round
(South Africa) Natalie Grandin	4	6	6
(New Zealand) Marina Erakovic	6	4	0
(India) Shikha Uberoi	5	2
14	(Russia) Galina Voskoboeva	7	6

Qualifying competition
(South Africa) Natalie Grandin	6	1	1
14	(Russia) Galina Voskoboeva	2	6	6

=== Eleventh qualifier ===
First round
11	(Russia) Vasilisa Bardina	2	5
WC	(Hungary) Ágnes Szávay	6	7
(Germany) Stephanie Gehrlein	2	0
WC	(France) Mailyne Andrieux	6	6
(Germany) Sabine Klaschka	6	6
(Romania) Magda Mihalache	4	1
WC	(France) Gracia Radovanovic	6^{1}	1
23	(France) Aravane Rezaï	7^{7}	6

Second round
WC	(Hungary) Ágnes Szávay	6	6
WC	(France) Mailyne Andrieux	1	2
(Germany) Sabine Klaschka	3	4
23	(France) Aravane Rezaï	6	6

Qualifying competition
WC	(Hungary) Ágnes Szávay	1	4
23	(France) Aravane Rezaï	6	6

=== Twelfth qualifier ===
First round
12	(Austria) Yvonne Meusburger	6	5	3
(Czech Republic) Barbora Strýcová	2	7	6
(Japan) Seiko Okamoto	1	3
(Austria) Daniela Kix	6	6
(Tunisia) Selima Sfar	3	6	6
(Puerto Rico) Vilmarie Castellvi	6	4	3
(Australia) Casey Dellacqua	2	4
20	(Ukraine) Yuliya Beygelzimer	6	6

Second round
(Czech Republic) Barbora Strýcová	6	6
(Austria) Daniela Kix	2	0
(Tunisia) Selima Sfar	2	0
20	(Ukraine) Yuliya Beygelzimer	6	6

Qualifying competition
(Czech Republic) Barbora Strýcová	4	2
20	(Ukraine) Yuliya Beygelzimer	6	6
