= Diana Brunel =

French tennis player (born 1981)

- Country (sports): France
- Born: 7 December 1981 (age 43)
- Plays: Right-handed
- Prize money: $43,034

Singles
- Career record: 130–135
- Career titles: 4 ITF
- Highest ranking: No. 392 (10 July 2006)

Grand Slam singles results
- French Open: Q1 (2006)

Doubles
- Career record: 40–32
- Career titles: 4 ITF
- Highest ranking: No. 285 (21 May 2001)

Grand Slam doubles results
- French Open: 1R (2006)

Diana Brunel (born 7 December 1981) is a French former professional tennis player.

A right-handed player from Nice, Brunel featured as a wildcard in the women's doubles main draw at the 2006 French Open, partnering Florence Haring.

Brunel won a total of eight titles on the ITF Women's Circuit, four in singles and four in doubles.

== ITF finals ==
Legend
$25,000 tournaments
$10,000 tournaments

=== Singles: 7 (4–3) ===
Result	No.	Date	Tournament	Surface	Opponent	Score
Loss	1.	25 June 2000	Montemor, Portugal	Clay	(France) Edith Nunes	4–6, 4–6
Win	1.	2 July 2000	Elvas, Portugal	Hard	(France) Elsa Morel	6–4, 6–3
Loss	2.	13 August 2001	Aosta, Italy	Clay	(Madagascar) Natacha Randriantefy	1–6, ret.
Loss	3.	4 July 2005	Le Touquet, France	Clay	(Denmark) Karina Jacobsgaard	0–6, 0–6
Win	2.	28 August 2005	Westende, Belgium	Hard	(France) Claire de Gubernatis	6–4, 3–6, 6–1
Win	3.	5 March 2006	Raanana, Israel	Hard	(Czech Republic) Veronika Raimrová	6–4, 6–2
Win	4.	12 March 2006	Haifa, Israel	Hard	(Slovakia) Linda Smolenaková	6–3, 6–3

=== Doubles: 6 (4–2) ===
Result	No.	Date	Tournament	Surface	Partner	Opponents	Score
Win	1.	2 July 2000	Elvas, Portugal	Hard	(France) Edith Nunes	(Portugal) Frederica Piedade (Portugal) Carlota Santos	7–5, 6–2
Win	2.	7 August 2000	Périgueux, France	Clay	(France) Edith Nunes	(France) Virginie Pichet (France) Chloé Carlotti	6–3, 6–4
Loss	1.	6 November 2000	Villenave-d'Ornon, France	Clay	(France) Edith Nunes	(Belgium) Caroline Maes (New Zealand) Shelley Stephens	1–4, 4–1, 2–4
Win	3.	20 November 2000	Deauville, France	Carpet	(France) Edith Nunes	(Bulgaria) Biljana Pawlowa-Dimitrova (Czech Republic) Magdalena Zděnovcová	4–3, 0–4, 4–2, 4–0
Win	4.	30 September 2001	Lerida, Spain	Clay	(France) Edith Nunes	(Austria) Susanne Filipp (Austria) Nina Egger	6–3, 6–2
Loss	2.	1 May 2006	Catania, Italy	Clay	(France) Virginie Pichet	(Italy) Francesca Lubiani (Italy) Valentina Sassi	w/o
