= Biljana Pawlowa-Dimitrova =

Bulgarian tennis player

Biljana Pawlowa-Dimitrova Биляна Павлова-Димитрова
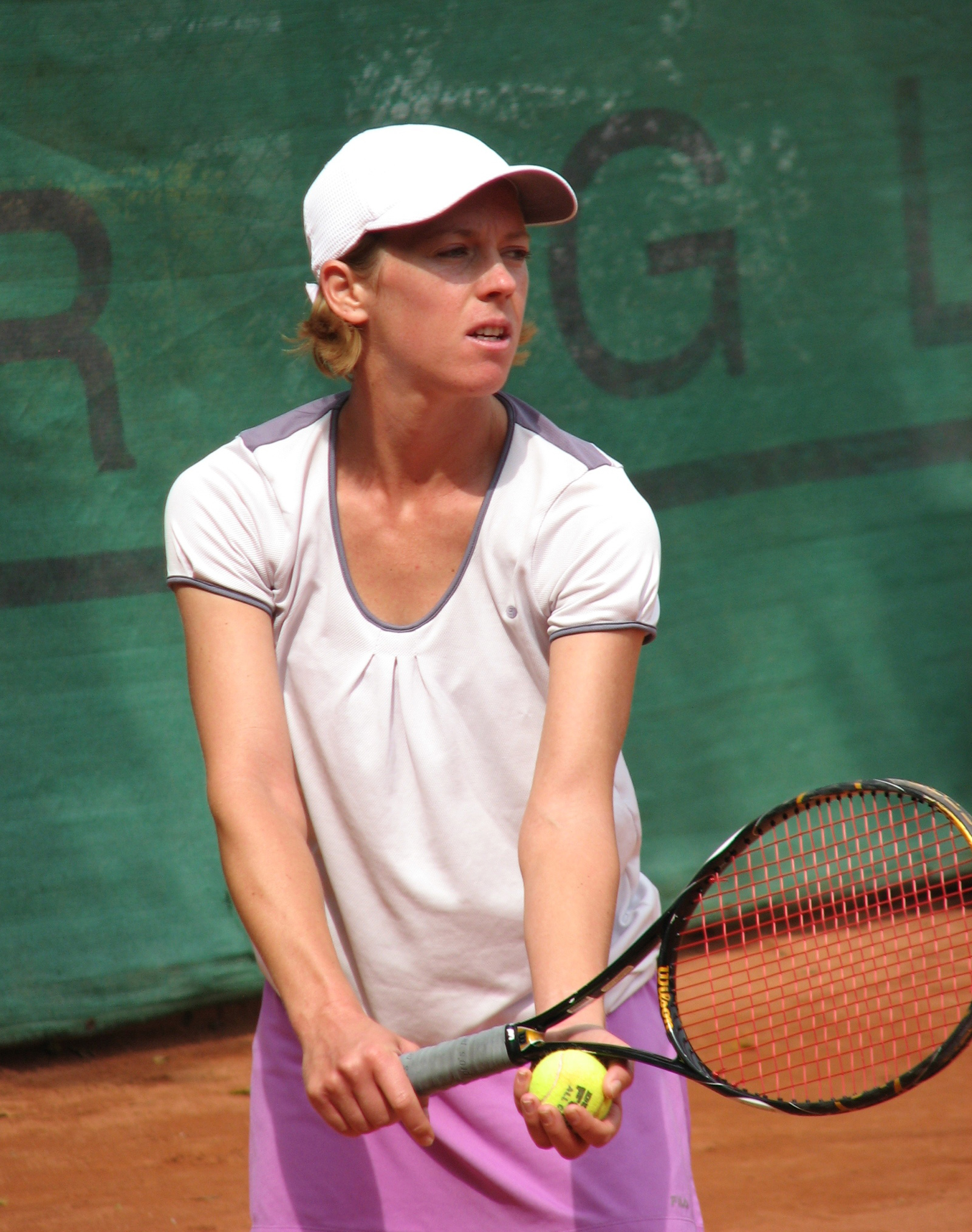
- Country (sports): Bulgaria
- Born: 20 January 1978 (age 48) Bulgaria
- Height: 1.72 m (5 ft 8 in)
- Turned pro: 1993
- Retired: 2013 (comeback 2024–25)
- Plays: Right (two-handed backhand)
- Prize money: $65,804

Singles
- Career record: 160–289
- Career titles: 1 ITF
- Highest ranking: No. 490 (16 October 2006)

Doubles
- Career record: 168–230
- Career titles: 3 ITF
- Highest ranking: No. 301 (20 April 2009)

Biljana Pawlowa-Dimitrova (Bulgarian: Биляна Павлова-Димитрова; born 20 January 1978) is a Bulgarian former professional tennis player. Her career-high WTA singles ranking is 490, which she reached on 16 October 2006. On 20 April 2009, she peaked at No. 301 in the doubles rankings.

She was first called up to the Bulgaria Fed Cup team in 2009 but made her debut in 2010. Since then she has a 0–1 singles record and a 1–0 doubles record (1–1 overall).

Born in Germany and of ethnically Bulgarian heritage, Pawlowa-Dimitrova holds both Bulgarian and German citizenships. She currently works as a coach for tennis club "Dema" in Sofia.

== ITF Circuit finals ==
=== Singles: 6 (1 title, 5 runner-ups) ===
Legend $50,000 tournaments $25,000 tournaments $10,000 tournaments	Finals by surface Hard (1–0) Clay (0–3) Carpet (0–2)

Result	W–L	Date	Tournament	Tier	Surface	Opponent	Score
Win	1–0	Jun 1998	ITF Kavala, Greece	10,000	Hard	(Federal Republic of Yugoslavia) Dragana Ilić	6–3, 7–6^{(1)}
Loss	1–1	Aug 2001	ITF Volos, Greece	10,000	Carpet	(Greece) Christina Zachariadou	0–6, 0–6
Loss	1–2	Nov 2005	ITF Giza, Egypt	10,000	Clay	(Russia) Galina Fokina	2–6, 5–7
Loss	1–3	May 2006	ITF Bournemouth, UK	10,000	Clay	(Netherlands) Marrit Boonstra	3–6, 0–6
Loss	1–4	Sep 2007	ITF Palić, Serbia	10,000	Clay	(Slovenia) Tadeja Majerič	2–6, 2–6
Loss	1–5	Oct 2007	ITF Volos, Greece	10,000	Carpet	(Poland) Olga Brózda	7–6^{(2)}, 2–6, 0–6

=== Doubles: 19 (3 titles, 16 runner-ups) ===
Legend $25,000 tournaments $10,000 tournaments	Finals by surface Hard (0–1) Clay (3–15)

Result	W–L	Date	Tournament	Tier	Surface	Partner	Opponents	Score
Loss	0–1	Aug 1997	ITF Muri Antichi, Italy	10,000	Clay	(Ukraine) Natalia Bondarenko	(Italy) Giulia Casoni (Italy) Federica Fortuni	6–7^{(7)}, 2–6
Loss	0–2	May 2000	ITF Casale, Italy	10,000	Clay	(Romania) Magda Mihalache	(France) Chloé Carlotti (Slovakia) Eva Fislová	1–6, 4–6
Loss	0–3	Jun 2000	ITF Skopje, Macedonia	10,000	Clay	(Federal Republic of Yugoslavia) Ljiljana Nanušević	(Federal Republic of Yugoslavia) Katarina Mišić (North Macedonia) Marina Lazarovska	6–7^{(6)}, 3–6
Win	1–3	Nov 2000	ITF Le Havre, France	10,000	Clay (i)	(Estonia) Ilona Poljakova	(China) Lui Li Shen (Romania) Alexandra Zotta	4–0, 4–1, 4–1
Loss	1–4	Nov 2000	ITF Deauville, France	10,000	Clay (i)	(Czech Republic) Magdalena Zděnovcová	(France) Diana Brunel (France) Edith Nunes	3–4, 4–0, 2–4, 0–4
Loss	1–5	Apr 2001	ITF Athens, Greece	10,000	Clay	(Croatia) Marijana Kovačević	(Austria) Sandra Klemenschits (Austria) Daniela Klemenschits	3–6, 5–7
Loss	1–6	Sep 2001	ITF Kastoria, Greece	10,000	Clay	(Turkey) İpek Şenoğlu	(Greece) Asimina Kaplani (Greece) Maria Pavlidou	3–6, 5–7
Loss	1–7	Oct 2004	ITF Podgorica, Montenegro	10,000	Clay	(Czech Republic) Janette Bejlková	(Serbia and Montenegro) Katarina Mišić (Serbia and Montenegro) Dragana Zarić	1–6, 2–6
Loss	1–8	Dec 2005	ITF Giza, Egypt	10,000	Clay	(Romania) Lenore Lăzăroiu	(Russia) Galina Fokina (Russia) Raissa Gourevitch	3–6, 5–7
Loss	1–9	Jun 2006	ITF Ruse, Bulgaria	10,000	Clay	(Bulgaria) Nadejda Vassileva	(Bulgaria) Dia Evtimova (Norway) Karoline Borgersen	0–6, 0–6
Loss	1–10	Nov 2006	ITF Cairo, Egypt	10,000	Clay	(Austria) Stefanie Haidner	(Romania) Alexandra Dulgheru (Netherlands) Marcella Koek	6–7^{(4)}, 6–3, 6–7^{(5)}
Loss	1–11	Oct 2007	ITF Dubrovnik, Croatia	10,000	Clay	(Belgium) Soetkin Van Deun	(Serbia) Miljana Adanko (Serbia) Nataša Zorić	w/o
Win	2–11	Nov 2007	ITF Barcelona, Spain	10,000	Clay	(Austria) Stefanie Haidner	(Latvia) Irina Kuzmina (Spain) Sheila Solsona-Carcasona	6–3, 6–7^{(8)}, [10–3]
Loss	2–12	Mar 2008	ITF Athens, Greece	10,000	Hard	(Italy) Raffaella Bindi	(Austria) Nikola Hofmanova (Italy) Vivienne Vierin	7–5, 5–7, [7–10]
Loss	2–13	May 2008	ITF Edinburgh, UK	10,000	Clay	(Belgium) Soetkin Van Deun	(United Kingdom) Jade Curtis (United Kingdom) Elizabeth Thomas	1–6, 6–7^{(5)}
Loss	2–14	Jun 2008	ITF Budva, Montenegro	10,000	Clay	(Croatia) Tamara Stojković	(Serbia) Ljubica Avramović (Serbia) Neda Kozić	4–6, 5–7
Win	3–14	Dec 2008	ITF Benicarló, Spain	10,000	Clay	(Serbia) Neda Kozić	(Romania) Simona Matei (Romania) Andreea Mitu	6–4, 7–6^{(3)}
Loss	3–15	Jun 2010	ITF Iași, Romania	10,000	Clay	(Oman) Fatma Al-Nabhani	(Romania) Mădălina Gojnea (Romania) Ionela-Andreea Iova	3–6, 3–6
Loss	3–16	Aug 2010	ITF Onești, Romania	10,000	Clay	(Romania) Camelia Hristea	(Romania) Laura Ioana Paar (Romania) Mihaela Buzărnescu	6–7^{(7)}, 2–6

== Fed Cup ==
=== Singles ===
Edition	Round	Date	Against	Surface	Opponent	W/L	Result
2010 Europe/Africa Group I	RR	5 February 2010	Slovenia	Hard (i)	(Slovenia) Andreja Klepač	L	6–4, 4–6, 3–6

=== Doubles ===
Edition	Round	Date	Partner	Against	Surface	Opponents	W/L	Result
2010 Europe/ Africa Group I	RR	5 February 2010	(Bulgaria) Elitsa Kostova	Slovenia	Hard (i)	(Slovenia) Andreja Klepač (Slovenia) Maša Zec-Peškirič	W	6–1, 6–2

- RR = Round Robin
