= Valentina Sulpizio =

Italian tennis player

- Country (sports): Italy
- Born: 18 August 1984 (age 42) Italy
- Turned pro: 2002
- Plays: Right (one-handed backhand)
- Prize money: $97,665

Singles
- Career record: 273–214
- Career titles: 8 ITF
- Highest ranking: No. 345 (24 October 2005)

Doubles
- Career record: 278–141
- Career titles: 41 ITF
- Highest ranking: 199 (31 October 2005)

Valentina Sulpizio (born 18 August 1984) is an Italian former professional tennis player.

Her highest WTA singles ranking is 345, which she reached on 24 October 2005. Her career-high ranking in doubles is 199, which she set on 31 October 2005.

== ITF Circuit finals ==
Legend
$100,000 tournaments
$75,000 tournaments
$50,000 tournaments
$25,000 tournaments
$10,000 tournaments

=== Singles: 12 (8 titles, 4 runner-ups) ===
Result	No.	Date	Tournament	Surface	Opponent	Score
Win	1.	14 May 2007	ITF Caserta, Italy	Clay	(Argentina) María Belén Corbalán	7–6^{(2)}, 0–6, 6–1
Loss	2.	29 May 2007	ITF Tortosa, Spain	Clay	(Spain) Rebeca Bou Nogueiro	5–7, 4–6
Loss	3.	17 September 2007	ITF Bratislava, Slovakia	Clay	(Slovakia) Dominika Nociarová	5–7, 2–6
Win	4.	22 October 2007	ITF Augusta, Italy	Clay	(Germany) Paola Sprovieri	7–6^{(5)}, 6–0
Win	5.	24 November 2007	ITF Barcelona, Spain	Clay	(Latvia) Irina Kuzmina	6–0, 2–0 ret.
Win	6.	31 March 2008	ITF Antalya, Turkey	Clay	(Netherlands) Marcella Koek	6–3, 6–3
Loss	7.	7 April 2008	ITF Antalya	Clay	(Netherlands) Michelle Gerards	5–7, 6–4, 4–6
Win	8.	25 May 2008	ITF Galați, Romania	Clay	(Slovakia) Kristína Kučová	6–2, 7–6
Win	9.	9 June 2008	ITF Craiova, Romania	Clay	(Italy) Agnese Zucchini	6–2, 6–4
Loss	10.	13 October 2008	ITF Settimo San Pietro, Italy	Clay	(Italy) Anna Floris	1–6, 3–6
Win	11.	20 April 2009	ITF Bol, Croatia	Clay	(Croatia) Tereza Mrdeža	3–6, 6–3, 6–4
Win	12.	9 August 2010	ITF Locri, Italy	Clay	(Argentina) María Belén Corbalán	6–1, 6–0

=== Doubles: 70 (41 titles, 29 runner-ups) ===
Result	No.	Date	Tournament	Surface	Partner	Opponents	Score
Win	1.	2 September 2002	ITF Chieti, Italy	Clay	(Italy) Katia Altilia	(Slovakia) Martina Babáková (Czech Republic) Veronika Ctvrtnicková	6–2, 2–6, 6–3
Loss	2.	13 October 2003	ITF Castel Gandolfo, Italy	Clay	(Czech Republic) Sandra Záhlavová	(Austria) Betina Pirker (Sweden) Aleksandra Srndovic	3–6, 6–4, 6–7
Win	3.	16 May 2004	ITF Casale, Italy	Clay	(Russia) Irina Smirnova	(Slovakia) Martina Babáková (Italy) Stefania Chieppa	6–3, 3–6, 6–3
Win	4.	4 July 2004	ITF Bibione, Italy	Clay	(Italy) Emilia Desiderio	(Croatia) Nadja Pavić (Slovakia) Linda Smolenaková	6–3, 6–4
Win	5.	18 July 2004	ITF Monteroni d'Arbia, Italy	Clay	(Czech Republic) Sandra Záhlavová	(Croatia) Matea Mezak (Croatia) Nadja Pavić	7–5, 4–6, 7–6^{(5)}
Win	6.	22 August 2004	ITF Jesi, Italy	Clay	(Italy) Stefania Chieppa	(Brazil) Larissa Carvalho (Italy) Elena Vianello	6–3, 7–5
Loss	7.	7 November 2004	ITF Rome, Italy	Clay	(Czech Republic) Sandra Záhlavová	(Italy) Stefania Chieppa (Italy) Nicole Clerico	6–3, 4–6, 2–6
Win	8.	20 March 2005	ITF Rome, Italy	Clay	(Czech Republic) Sandra Záhlavová	(Italy) Raffaella Bindi (Italy) Stefania Chieppa	7–5, 6–4
Win	9.	27 March 2005	ITF Rome, Italy	Clay	(Czech Republic) Sandra Záhlavová	(Croatia) Ivana Abramović (Austria) Stefanie Haidner	7–5, 5–7, 6–1
Loss	10.	2 May 2005	ITF Catania, Italy	Clay	(Italy) Giulia Gabba	(Italy) Alberta Brianti (Italy) Giulia Casoni	3–6, 3–6
Win	11.	12 June 2005	Gorizia, Italy	Clay	(Italy) Giulia Casoni	(Ukraine) Olena Antypina (Russia) Nina Bratchikova	6–2, 6–0
Loss	12.	28 June 2005	Fano, Italy	Clay	(Austria) Stefanie Haidner	(Czech Republic) Gabriela Chmelinová (Czech Republic) Michaela Paštiková	2–6, 0–6
Loss	13.	12 September 2005	Torre del Greco, Italy	Clay	(Austria) Stefanie Haidner	(Germany) Mareike Biglmaier (Slovakia) Jana Jurićova	2–6, 6–4, 3–6
Loss	14.	25 March 2006	Parioli, Italy	Clay	(Italy) Stefania Chieppa	(Poland) Magdalena Kiszczyńska (Romania) Simona Matei	2–6, 3–6
Loss	15.	21 May 2006	Caserta, Italy	Clay	(Italy) Silvia Disderi	(Czech Republic) Petra Cetkovská (Czech Republic) Sandra Záhlavová	2–6, 0–6
Win	16.	3 July 2006	Naples, Italy	Clay	(Italy) Verdiana Verardi	(Italy) Emilia Desiderio (Austria) Stefanie Haidner	6–1, 6–3
Win	17.	31 July 2006	Gardone Val Trompia, Italy	Clay	(Italy) Verdiana Verardi	(Italy) Emilia Desiderio (France) Anais Laurendon	6–1, 6–3
Win	18.	9 October 2006	Castel Gandolfo, Italy	Clay	(Italy) Anna Floris	(Italy) Giorgia Mortello (Italy) Lisa Tognetti	6–2, 6–1
Win	19.	21 January 2007	Stuttgart, Germany	Hard (i)	(France) Claire de Gubernatis	(Czech Republic) Iveta Gerlová (Czech Republic) Lucie Kriegsmannová	6–1, 6–4
Win	20.	18 February 2007	Mallorca, Spain	Clay	(Italy) Stefania Chieppa	(Brazil) Fernanda Hermenegildo (Brazil) Fabiana Mak	5–7, 6–3, 6–4
Win	21.	10 March 2007	Quartu Sant'Elena, Italy	Hard	(Italy) Anna Floris	(Switzerland) Lisa Sabino (Germany) Andrea Sieveke	7–6^{(2)}, 7–6^{(4)}
Loss	22.	25 March 2007	Cairo, Egypt	Clay	(Italy) Anna Floris	(Russia) Galina Fokina (Azerbaijan) Elina Gasanova	5–7, 1–6
Win	23.	3 June 2007	Tortosa, Spain	Clay	(Italy) Verdiana Verardi	(Argentina) Paula Cantarutti (Spain) Sabina Mediano-Alvarez	7–5, 7–5
Win	24.	4 June 2007	Amarante, Portugal	Hard	(Italy) Elisa Balsamo	(Spain) Carolina Gago-Fuentes (Spain) Sabina Mediano-Álvarez	4–6, 6–4, 6–4
Win	25.	17 June 2007	Montemor-o-Novo, Portugal	Hard	(Italy) Elisa Balsamo	(Thailand) Noppawan Lertcheewakarn (Thailand) Varanya Vijuksanaboon	6–1, 6–0
Win	26.	25 August 2007	Trecastagni, Italy	Hard	(Italy) Valentina Sassi	(Switzerland) Lisa Sabino (Italy) Nicole Clerico	4–6, 6–4, 7–5
Win	27.	27 August 2007	Vittoria, Italy	Clay	(Italy) Claudia Giovine	(Spain) Lucia Gatti (Spain) Gabriella Polito	6–2, 6–1
Win	28.	24 September 2007	Ciampino, Italy	Clay	(Italy) Verdiana Verardi	(Italy) Astrid Besser (Italy) Letizia Lo Re	6–3, 6–4
Win	29.	15 October 2007	Settimo San Pietro, Italy	Clay	(Italy) Anna Floris	(Italy) Stefania Chieppa (Italy) Valentina Sassi	6–1, 6–4
Win	30.	22 October 2007	Augusta, Italy	Clay	(Italy) Anna Floris	(Italy) Letizia Lo Re (Italy) Anna Remondina	6–1, 6–1
Win	31.	4 February 2008	Mallorca, Spain	Clay	(Switzerland) Lisa Sabino	(Spain) Leticia Costas (Spain) Maite Gabarrús-Alonso	6–3, 7–6
Loss	32.	1 March 2008	Sant Boi de Llobregat, Spain	Clay	(Italy) Elisa Balsamo	(Argentina) Mailen Auroux (Uruguay) Estefanía Craciún	1–6, 3–6
Loss	33.	3 March 2008	Sabadell, Spain	Clay	(Italy) Elisa Balsamo	(Italy) Giulia Gatto-Monticone (Italy) Federica Quercia	2–6, 0–6
Loss	34.	10 March 2008	Rome, Italy	Clay	(Italy) Stefania Chieppa	(Romania) Ioana Ivan (Belarus) Ksenia Milevskaya	3–6, 6–7
Win	35.	30 March 2008	Latina, Italy	Clay	(Italy) Elisa Balsamo	(Bosnia and Herzegovina) Sandra Martinović (Germany) Kathrin Wörle-Scheller	0–6, 7–6^{(6)}, [10–7]
Win	36.	5 April 2008	Antalya, Turkey	Clay	(Romania) Simona Matei	(Russia) Eugeniya Pashkova (Russia) Avgusta Tsybysheva	6–2, 5–7, [10–4]
Win	37.	12 April 2008	Antalya, Turkey	Clay	(Italy) Elisa Balsamo	(Netherlands) Michelle Gerards (Netherlands) Marcella Koek	6–2, 6–2
Loss	38.	19 April 2008	Antalya, Turkey	Clay	(Italy) Elisa Balsamo	(Netherlands) Michelle Gerards (Netherlands) Marcella Koek	3–6, 4–6
Win	39.	25 May 2008	Galați, Romania	Clay	(Slovakia) Kristína Kučová	(Romania) Alexandra Cadanțu (Romania) Antonia Xenia Tout	6–0, 6–2
Win	40.	31 May 2008	Tortosa, Spain	Clay	(Italy) Elena Pioppo	(Spain) Yera Campos-Molina (Spain) Irene Rehberger Bescos	7–6^{(5)}, 6–1
Loss	41.	8 June 2008	Pitești, Romania	Clay	(Romania) Simona Matei	(Romania) Laura-Ioana Andrei (Romania) Mihaela Buzărnescu	5–7, 6–3, [2–10]
Loss	42.	16 June 2008	Bucharest, Romania	Clay	(Italy) Benedetta Davato	(Romania) Laura-Ioana Andrei (Romania) Mihaela Buzărnescu	4–6, 6–4, [6–10]
Loss	43.	4 August 2008	Monteroni d'Arbia, Italy	Clay	(Italy) Verdiana Verardi	(Bosnia and Herzegovina) Mervana Jugić-Salkić (France) Aurélie Védy	4–6, 2–6
Loss	44.	1 September 2008	Martina Franca, Italy	Clay	(Italy) Anna Floris	(Italy) Elena Pioppo (Switzerland) Lisa Sabino	6–3, 4–6, [7–10]
Win	45.	6 October 2008	Reggio Calabria, Italy	Clay	(Italy) Anna Floris	(Italy) Nicole Clerico (Austria) Patricia Mayr-Achleitner	6–2, 6–3
Win	46.	9 March 2009	Rome, Italy	Clay	(Italy) Claudia Giovine	(Bosnia and Herzegovina) Jasmina Kajtazovic (Spain) Lucía Sainz	4–6, 6–0, [10–6]
Loss	47.	20 March 2009	Rome, Italy	Clay	(Italy) Claudia Giovine	(Poland) Karolina Kosińska (Czech Republic) Simona Dobrá	3–6, 4–6
Win	48.	11 May 2009	Antalya, Turkey	Clay	(United Kingdom) Amanda Carreras	(Belgium) An-Sophie Mestach (Belgium) Sofie Oyen	4–6, 6–3, [10–4]
Win	49.	18 May 2009	Antalya, Turkey	Clay	(United Kingdom) Amanda Carreras	(Sweden) Julia Klackenberg (Sweden) Sandra Roma	6–0, 6–3
Loss	50.	8 June 2009	Campobasso, Italy	Clay	(Italy) Anna Floris	(Argentina) Jorgelina Cravero (Portugal) Frederica Piedade	3–6, 4–6
Loss	51.	15 June 2009	Padua, Italy	Clay	(Italy) Elena Pioppo	(Hungary) Anikó Kapros (Austria) Sandra Klemenschits	6–7, 1–6
Loss	52.	7 August 2009	Rebecq, Belgium	Clay	(Romania) Patricia Chirea	(Netherlands) Kiki Bertens (Netherlands) Nicole Thyssen	2–6, 5–7
Loss	53.	11 May 2009	Arezzo, Italy	Clay	(Italy) Stefania Chieppa	(Italy) Giulia Gatto-Monticone (Italy) Federica Quercia	3–6, 6–4, [2–10]
Loss	54.	28 September 2009	Ciampino, Italy	Clay	(Italy) Stefania Chieppa	(Bosnia and Herzegovina) Sandra Martinović (Russia) Marina Shamayko	6–7, 4–6
Win	55.	7 March 2010	Madrid, Spain	Clay	(Italy) Elisa Balsamo	(Russia) Marina Shamayko (Serbia) Neda Kozić	6–3, 7–6^{(3)}
Win	56.	17 May 2010	Rivoli, Italy	Clay	(Italy) Stefania Chieppa	(Italy) Stefania Fadabini (Italy) Alice Moroni	7–6^{(1)}, 6–1
Loss	57.	14 June 2010	Padua, Italy	Clay	(Italy) Claudia Giovine	(Austria) Sandra Klemenschits (Slovenia) Andreja Klepač	6–4, 4–6, [5–10]
Loss	58.	25 June 2010	Rome, Italy	Clay	(Italy) Claudia Giovine	(Australia) Sophie Ferguson (Australia) Trudi Musgrave	0–6, 3–6
Win	59.	5 July 2010	Turin, Italy	Clay	(Italy) Elisa Balsamo	(Italy) Alice Balducci (Italy) Martina Caciotti	7–5, 6–3
Win	60.	7 August 2010	Monteroni d'Arbia, Italy	Clay	(Italy) Claudia Giovine	(Italy) Evelyn Mayr (Italy) Julia Mayr	6–2, 4–6, [10–5]
Win	61.	9 August 2010	Locri, Italy	Clay	(Italy) Federica di Sarra	(Italy) Federica Graziosoi (Italy) Alice Savoretti	6–4, 6–2
Loss	62.	5 September 2010	Balş, Romania	Clay	(Bulgaria) Martina Gledacheva	(Romania) Alexandra Cadanțu (Romania) Alexandra Damaschin	3–6, 5–7
Win	63.	27 September 2010	Ciampino, Italy	Clay	(Romania) Diana Buzean	(Italy) Stefania Chieppa (Bulgaria) Martina Gledacheva	6–4, 6–4
Win	64.	4 October 2010	Cagliari, Italy	Clay	(Italy) Elisa Salis	(Denmark) Mai Grage (Netherlands) Eva Wacanno	w/o
Loss	65.	11 October 2010	Settimo San Pietro, Italy	Hard	(Italy) Elisa Salis	(Germany) Sabrina Baumgarten (Netherlands) Valeria Podda	5–7, 0–6
Loss	66.	20 February 2011	Antalya, Turkey	Clay	(Romania) Patricia Chirea	(Russia) Irina Glimakova (Russia) Polina Monova	3–6, 3–6
Loss	67.	4 April 2011	Pomezia, Italy	Clay	(Italy) Claudia Giovine	(Italy) Benedetta Davato (Switzerland) Lisa Sabino	7–6, 4–6, [8–10]
Win	68.	30 April 2011	San Severo, Italy	Clay	(Bulgaria) Martina Gledacheva	(Italy) Adriana Lavoretti (Switzerland) Mirjam Zeller	6–2, 6–1
Loss	69.	3 June 2011	Florence, Italy	Clay	(Italy) Nicole Clerico	(Romania) Mihaela Buzărnescu (Slovakia) Zuzana Zlochová	3–6, 4–6
Win	70.	4 July 2011	ITF Torino, Italy	Clay	(Italy) Benedetta Davato	(Japan) Yuka Higuchi (Japan) Kaori Onishi	6–4, 6–3
