= Stefanie Haidner =

Austrian tennis player (born 1977)

- Country (sports): Austria
- Born: 18 November 1977 (age 48) Vienna, Austria
- Turned pro: 1999
- Retired: 2015
- Plays: Right-handed (two-handed backhand)
- Prize money: $94,427

Singles
- Career record: 231–257
- Career titles: 0
- Highest ranking: 232 (23 February 2004)

Doubles
- Career record: 188–173
- Career titles: 18 ITF
- Highest ranking: 165 (19 July 2004)

Stefanie Haidner (born 18 November 1977) is an Austrian former tennis player.

In her career, she won 18 doubles titles on the ITF Women's Circuit. Her career-high WTA singles ranking is 232, which she reached on 23 February 2004. On 19 July 2004, she peaked at No. 165 in the doubles rankings.

Haidner made her WTA Tour debut at the 2003 Linz Open, partnering Adriana Jerabek in doubles, but lost her quarterfinals match against fellow Marion Bartoli and Silvia Farina Elia. And at 2008 Gastein Ladies, partnering Hülya Esen in doubles, they lost in the first round.

Haidner retired from the professional tour 2015.

== ITF finals ==
=== Singles (0–5) ===
Legend $100,000 tournaments $75,000 tournaments $50,000 tournaments $25,000 tournaments $10,000 tournaments	Finals by surface Hard (0–0) Clay (0–5) Grass (0–0) Carpet (0–0)

Result	No.	Date	Tournament	Surface	Opponent	Score
Loss	1.	14 September 1998	Reggio Calabria, Italy	Clay	(Romania) Andreea Ehritt-Vanc	5–7, 3–6
Loss	2.	23 August 1999	Cuneo, Italy	Clay	(Italy) Roberta Vinci	1–6, 2–6
Loss	3.	20 September 1999	Lecce, Italy	Clay	(Italy) Roberta Vinci	3–6, 1–6
Loss	4.	22 June 2003	Lenzerheide, Switzerland	Clay	(Hungary) Melinda Czink	3–6, 3–6
Loss	5.	28 November 2005	Giza, Egypt	Clay	(Russia) Galina Fokina	2–6, 4–6

=== Doubles (18–25) ===
Legend $100,000 tournaments $75,000 tournaments $50,000 tournaments $25,000 tournaments $10,000 tournaments	Finals by surface Hard (1–1) Clay (17–24) Grass (0–0) Carpet (0–0)

Result	No.	Date	Tournament	Surface	Partner	Opponents	Score
Loss	1.	27 July 1998	Rabat, Morocco	Clay	(Austria) Nina Schwarz	(Austria) Susanne Filipp (Austria) Bettina Resch	6–4, 5–7, 2–6
Loss	2.	17 August 1998	Maribor, Slovenia	Clay	(Austria) Julia Adlbrecht	(Czech Republic) Linda Faltynkova (Czech Republic) Petra Plackova	2–6, 1–6
Win	1.	27 September 1998	Lecce, Italy	Clay	(Italy) Katia Altilia	(Italy) Giulia Casoni (Italy) Stefania Chieppa	6–0, 6–2
Loss	3.	2 May 1999	Maglie, Italy	Clay	(Argentina) Jorgelina Torti	(Italy) Silvia Disderi (Italy) Anna Floris	0–6, 6–2, 2–6
Win	2.	21 June 1999	Alkmaar, Netherlands	Clay	(Netherlands) Debby Haak	(Netherlands) Jolanda Mens (Netherlands) Anouk Sterk	6–4, 1–6, 6–3
Loss	4.	5 July 1999	Amersfoort, Netherlands	Clay	(Hungary) Adrienn Hegedűs	(Netherlands) Natasha Galouza (Netherlands) Debby Haak	6–7^{(2–7)}, 4–6
Loss	5.	27 September 1999	Fiumicino, Italy	Clay	(Hungary) Katalin Miskolczi	(Czech Republic) Olga Vymetálková (Czech Republic) Gabriela Navrátilová	3–6, 3–6
Win	3.	31 January 2000	Mallorca, Spain	Clay	(Netherlands) Debby Haak	(France) Aurélie Védy (Sweden) Maria Wolfbrandt	6–4, 3–6, 6–4
Win	4.	11 September 2000	Biograd, Croatia	Clay	(Austria) Bianca Kamper	(Bosnia and Herzegovina) Mervana Jugić-Salkić (Federal Republic of Yugoslavia) Ljiljana Nanušević	6–3, 5–7, 7–5
Loss	6.	13 August 2001	Aosta, Italy	Clay	(Argentina) Luciana Masante	(France) Kildine Chevalier (Madagascar) Natacha Randriantefy	6–1, 2–6, 2–6
Loss	7.	27 September 2001	Spoleto, Italy	Clay	(Argentina) Luciana Masante	(Italy) Silvia Disderi (Italy) Anna Floris	4–6, 5–7
Win	5.	11 February 2002	Bergamo, Italy	Clay	(Italy) Silvia Disderi	(Czech Republic) Zuzana Hejdová (Czech Republic) Renata Kučerová	7–5, 6–3
Loss	8.	3 June 2002	Staré Splavy, Czech Republic	Clay	(Czech Republic) Renata Kučerová	(Czech Republic) Eva Erbová (Czech Republic) Lenka Novotná	6–7^{(5–7)}, 0–6
Win	6.	1 July 2002	Mont de Marsan, France	Clay	(Madagascar) Natacha Randriantefy	(France) Séverine Beltrame (France) Amandine Dulon	6–4, 6–2
Loss	9.	26 August 2002	Spoleto, Italy	Clay	(Italy) Silvia Disderi	(Italy) Alice Canepa (Italy) Emily Stellato	2–6, 2–6
Loss	10.	9 February 2003	Bergamo, Italy	Hard (i)	(Austria) Bianca Kamper	(Croatia) Darija Jurak (Croatia) Ana Vrljić	4–6, 4–6
Win	7.	10 March 2003	Makarska, Croatia	Clay	(Austria) Daniela Klemenschits	(Romania) Gabriela Niculescu (Romania) Monica Niculescu	3–6, 7–6^{(9–7)}, 6–4
Win	8.	31 March 2003	Naples, Italy	Clay	(Brazil) Vanessa Menga	(Romania) Oana Elena Golimbioschi (Hungary) Eszter Molnár	7–6^{(8–6)}, 6–3
Win	9.	7 April 2003	Torre del Greco, Italy	Clay	(Italy) Giulia Meruzzi	(Italy) Elisa Balsamo (Italy) Debora Carmassi	6–4, 6–3
Loss	11.	10 August 2003	Cuneo, Italy	Clay	(Bulgaria) Lubomira Bacheva	(Bosnia and Herzegovina) Mervana Jugić-Salkić (Croatia) Darija Jurak	1–6, 2–6
Loss	12.	26 April 2004	Taranto, Italy	Clay	(Austria) Patricia Wartusch	(Austria) Daniela Klemenschits (Austria) Sandra Klemenschits	2–6, 1–6
Win	10.	13 March 2005	Naples, Italy	Clay	(Italy) Alberta Brianti	(Italy) Anna Floris (Italy) Giulia Meruzzi	6–4, 6–3
Loss	13.	21 March 2005	Rome, Italy	Clay	(Croatia) Ivana Abramović	(Italy) Valentina Sulpizio (Czech Republic) Sandra Záhlavová	5–7, 7–5, 1–6
Win	11.	18 April 2005	Bari, Italy	Clay	(Bosnia and Herzegovina) Mervana Jugić-Salkić	(Italy) Stefania Chieppa (Switzerland) Romina Oprandi	6–3, 7–6^{(7–3)}
Loss	14.	28 June 2005	Fano, Italy	Clay	(Italy) Valentina Sulpizio	(Czech Republic) Gabriela Chmelinová (Czech Republic) Michaela Paštiková	2–6, 0–6
Win	12.	15 August 2005	Helsinki, Finland	Hard	(Bulgaria) Maria Geznenge	(Finland) Emma Laine (Finland) Essi Laine	7–5, 2–6, 6–4
Loss	15.	12 September 2005	Torre del Greco, Italy	Clay	(Italy) Valentina Sulpizio	(Germany) Mareike Biglmaier (Slovakia) Jana Jurićová	2–6, 6–4, 3–6
Win	13.	15 November 2005	Mallorca, Spain	Clay	(Croatia) Gianna Doz	(Spain) Cristina Bala Abella (Spain) Berta Morata-Flaquer	6–4, 6–0
Loss	16.	22 November 2005	Giza, Egypt	Clay	(Italy) Emilia Desiderio	(Russia) Galina Fokina (Russia) Raissa Gourevitch	4–6, 3–6
Loss	17.	13 March 2006	Rome, Italy	Clay	(Croatia) Gianna Doz	(Croatia) Darija Jurak (Germany) Carmen Klaschka	2–6, 2–6
Loss	18.	18 April 2006	Bari, Italy	Clay	(Croatia) Darija Jurak	(Switzerland) Romina Oprandi (Germany) Caroline Schneider	5–7, 2–6
Loss	19.	3 July 2006	Naples, Italy	Clay	(Italy) Emilia Desiderio	(Italy) Valentina Sulpizio (Austria) Verdiana Verardi	1–6, 3–6
Win	14.	8 August 2006	Jesi, Italy	Clay	(France) Anaïs Laurendon	(France) Kildine Chevalier (Italy) Elena Vianello	6–0, 6–3
Win	15.	29 October 2006	Dubrovnik, Croatia	Clay	(Serbia) Teodora Mirčić	(Slovenia) Aleksandra Lukič (Slovenia) Patricia Vollmeier	6–4, 6–3
Loss	20.	26 November 2006	Cairo, Egypt	Clay	(Bulgaria) Biljana Pawlowa-Dimitrova	(Romania) Alexandra Dulgheru (Netherlands) Marcella Koek	6–7^{(4–7)}, 6–3, 6–7^{(5–7)}
Loss	21.	26 March 2007	Foggia, Italy	Clay	(Switzerland) Lisa Sabino	(Italy) Stefania Chieppa (Italy) Giulia Gatto-Monticone	1–6, 3–6
Loss	22.	21 August 2007	Wahlstedt, Germany	Clay	(Poland) Natalia Kołat	(Serbia) Neda Kozić (Germany) Antonia Matic	1–6, 6–2, 3–6
Win	16.	27 August 2007	Pörtschach, Austria	Clay	(Austria) Eva-Maria Hoch	(Slovenia) Taja Mohorčič (Serbia) Nataša Zorić	6–2, 6–2
Loss	23.	23 September 2007	Bratislava, Slovakia	Clay	(Austria) Nicole Rottmann	(Slovakia) Monika Kochanová (Slovakia) Klaudia Malenovská	5–7, 6–7^{(4–7)}
Loss	24.	1 October 2007	Castel Gandolfo, Italy	Clay	(Switzerland) Amra Sadiković	(Italy) Stefania Chieppa (Italy) Giulia Gatto-Monticone	2–3 ret.
Loss	25.	8 October 2007	Reggio Calabria, Italy	Clay	(Bosnia and Herzegovina) Sandra Martinović	(Spain) Marta Marrero (Spain) María José Martínez Sánchez	1–6, 2–6
Win	17.	19 November 2007	Barcelona, Spain	Clay	(Bulgaria) Biljana Pawlowa-Dimitrova	(Latvia) Irina Kuzmina (Spain) Sheila Solsona-Carcasona	6–3, 6–7^{(8–10)}, [10–3]
Win	18.	21 April 2008	Naples, Italy	Clay	(Italy) Sara Savarise	(Italy) Valeria Casillo (Russia) Ekaterina Strogonova	6–3, 6–2
