= Anna Floris =

Italian tennis player

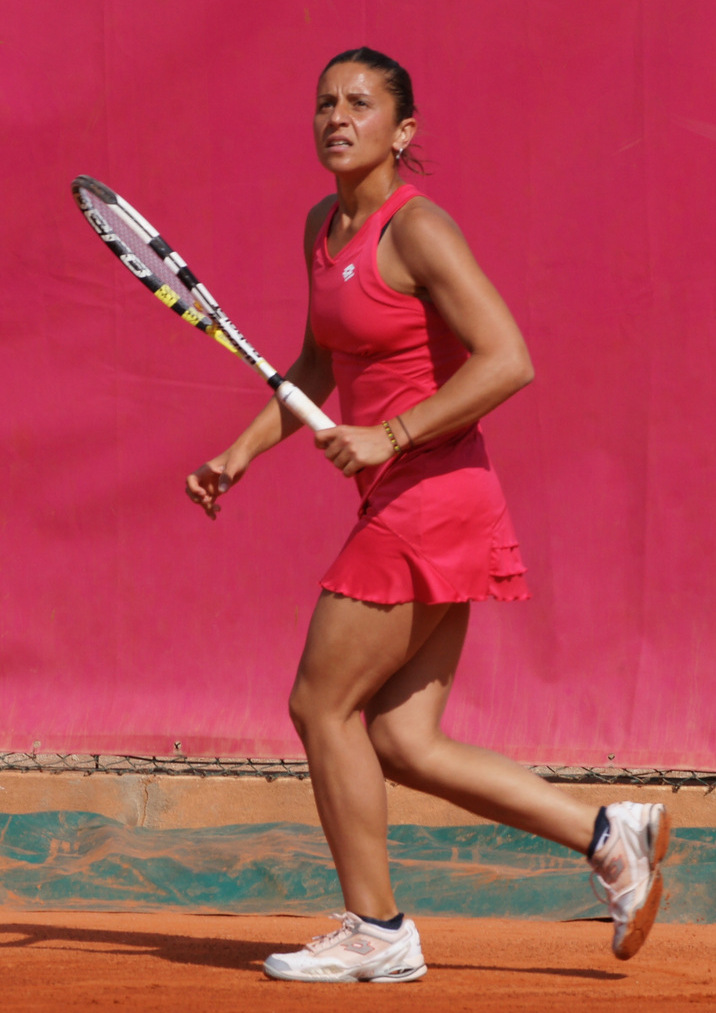
- Floris at the 2012 Open de Cagnes-sur-Mer
- Country (sports): Italy
- Born: 15 May 1982 (age 43)
- Turned pro: 1998
- Retired: 2016
- Plays: Left (two-handed backhand)
- Prize money: $281,752

Singles
- Career record: 420–337
- Career titles: 12 ITF
- Highest ranking: No. 129 (16 August 2010)

Grand Slam singles results
- Australian Open: Q3 (2010)
- French Open: Q2 (2011)
- Wimbledon: Q2 (2010)
- US Open: Q2 (2009)

Doubles
- Career record: 147–101
- Career titles: 16 ITF
- Highest ranking: No. 213 (9 March 2009)

Anna Floris (Italian pronunciation: [ˈanna ˈflɔːris]; born 15 May 1982) is a former professional tennis player from Italy.

In her career, she won 12 singles and 16 doubles titles on the ITF Women's Circuit. On 16 August 2010, she reached her best singles ranking of world No. 129. On 9 March 2009, she peaked at No. 213 in the doubles rankings.

Floris won her first $50k tournament in October 2009 at the Torneo Internacional Femenino Villa de Madrid, defeating Dia Evtimova in the final.

Anna Floris retired from professional tennis in 2016.

== ITF Circuit finals ==
$100,000 tournaments
$80,000 tournaments
$60,000 tournaments
$25,000 tournaments
$15,000 tournaments
$10,000 tournaments

=== Singles (12–19) ===
Outcome	No.	Date	Tournament	Surface	Opponent	Score
Runner-up	1.	10 May 1999	Tortosa, Spain	Clay	(Spain) Lourdes Domínguez Lino	1–6, 4–6
Runner-up	2.	8 August 2001	Bath, England	Hard	(Russia) Ekaterina Sysoeva	4–6, 0–6
Runner-up	3.	10 September 2001	Madrid, Spain	Clay	(Spain) Arantxa Parra Santonja	6–3, 3–6, 0–6
Runner-up	4.	24 September 2001	Lleida, Spain	Clay	(Austria) Nina Egger	6–3, 0–6, 4–6
Winner	1.	8 October 2001	Catania, Italy	Clay	(Ukraine) Oleksandra Kravets	6–4, 6–3
Winner	2.	28 October 2001	Al Mansoura, Egypt	Clay	(Russia) Olga Kalyuzhnaya	7–6, 6–7, 6–3
Runner-up	5.	24 February 2002	Vale do Lobo, Portugal	Hard	(Spain) Arantxa Parra Santonja	0–6, 4–6
Runner-up	6.	11 October 2004	Castel Gandolfo, Italy	Clay	(France) Aravane Rezaï	6–3, 2–6, 5–7
Runner-up	7.	31 October 2004	Quartu Sant'Elena, Italy	Clay	(Italy) Emily Stellato	6–2, 3–6, 4–6
Runner-up	8.	20 February 2005	Mallorca, Spain	Clay	(Switzerland) Romina Oprandi	3–6, 0–6
Winner	3.	13 March 2005	Naples, Italy	Clay	(Italy) Raffaella Bindi	6–2, 6–3
Runner-up	9.	24 April 2005	Valencia, Spain	Clay	(France) Stephanie Foretz	3–6, 0–6
Winner	4.	3 September 2005	Vittoria, Italy	Clay	(Spain) Carla Suárez Navarro	6–4, 7–5
Winner	5.	17 October 2005	Settimo San Pietro, Italy	Clay	(Russia) Regina Kulikova	6–4, 4–1 ret.
Runner-up	10.	7 February 2006	Mallorca, Spain	Clay	(Austria) Tina Schiechtl	3–6, 6–2, 4–6
Winner	6.	28 March 2006	Rome, Italy	Clay	(Russia) Marina Shamayko	6–3, 6–0
Winner	7.	21 August 2006	Trecastagni, Italy	Hard	(Russia) Regina Kulikova	6–7, 6–0, 6–2
Winner	8.	5 March 2007	Quartu Sant'Elena, Italy	Hard	(Italy) Federica Di Sarra	6–1, 6–4
Runner-up	11.	14 May 2007	Gran Canaria, Spain	Clay	(Spain) Carla Suárez Navarro	2–6, 2–6
Runner-up	12.	21 August 2007	Trecastagni, Italy	Hard	(Japan) Chiaki Okadaue	6–7^{(6–8)}, 6–7^{(4–7)}
Winner	9.	27 August 2007	Vittoria, Italy	Clay	(Italy) Agnese Zucchini	6–1, 6–4
Winner	10.	15 October 2007	Settimo San Pietro, Italy	Clay	(Italy) Valentina Sassi	7–6^{(7–2)}, 6–3
Runner-up	13.	21 January 2008	Wrexham, Wales	Hard (i)	(Russia) Elena Kulikova	4–6, 0–6
Runner-up	14.	1 September 2008	Martina Franca, Italy	Clay	(Bosnia and Herzegovina) Mervana Jugić-Salkić	4–6, 6–4, 1–6
Winner	11.	13 October 2008	Settimo San Pietro, Italy	Clay	(Italy) Valentina Sulpizio	6–1, 6–3
Winner	12.	18 October 2009	Madrid, Spain	Clay	(Bulgaria) Dia Evtimova	6–1, 6–3
Runner-up	15.	5 April 2010	Civitavecchia, Italy	Clay	(Czech Republic) Renata Voráčová	3–6, 3–6
Runner-up	16.	7 August 2010	Monteroni d'Arbia, Italy	Clay	(Romania) Liana Ungur	5–7, 1–6
Runner-up	17.	10 December 2012	Djibouti City	Hard	(Russia) Yana Sizikova	2–6, 6–4, 4–6
Runner-up	18.	8 April 2013	Heraklion, Greece	Carpet	(Switzerland) Karin Kennel	1–6, 6–3, 3–6
Runner-up	19.	6 May 2013	Pula, Italy	Clay	(Ukraine) Sofiya Kovalets	4–6, 6–1, 4–6

=== Doubles (16–14) ===
Outcome	No.	Date	Tournament	Surface	Partner	Opponents	Score
Winner	1.	2 May 1999	Maglie, Italy	Clay	(Italy) Silvia Disderi	(Austria) Stefanie Haidner (Argentina) Jorgelina Torti	6–0, 2–6, 6–2
Runner-up	1.	25 June 2000	Montemor-o-Novo, Portugal	Clay	(Italy) Giulia Meruzzi	(France) Victoria Courmes (France) Élodie le Bescond	6–4, 4–6, 6–7^{(4)}
Runner-up	2.	27 August 2000	Cuneo, Italy	Clay	(Italy) Silvia Disderi	(Italy) Maria Elena Camerin (Italy) Mara Santangelo	5–7, 2–6
Winner	2.	17 September 2000	Madrid, Spain	Clay	(France) Elsa Morel	(Switzerland) Marylene Losey (Slovakia) Lucia Tallová	7–6^{(5)}, 6–1
Runner-up	3.	8 August 2001	Bath, England	Hard	(Germany) Susi Bensch	(Russia) Ekaterina Sysoeva (Russia) Natalia Egorova	6–7^{(4)}, 6–7^{(4)}
Winner	3.	3 September 2001	Chieti, Italy	Clay	(Italy) Giulia Meruzzi	(Australia) Michelle Summerside (United Kingdom) Jane White	6–4, 6–1
Runner-up	4.	10 September 2001	Madrid, Spain	Clay	(Spain) Sonia Delgado	(France) Kildine Chevalier (France) Stéphanie Cohen-Aloro	6–2, 2–6, 2–6
Winner	4.	27 September 2001	Spoleto, Italy	Clay	(Italy) Silvia Disderi	(Austria) Stefanie Haidner (Argentina) Luciana Masante	6–4, 7–5
Winner	5.	14 October 2001	Catania, Italy	Clay	(Russia) Nina Bratchikova	(Italy) Georgia Mortello (Italy) Lisa Tognetti	6–2, 5–7, 7–6^{(8)}
Runner-up	5.	19 November 2001	Mallorca, Spain	Clay	(Italy) Silvia Disderi	(Austria) Daniela Klemenschits (Austria) Sandra Klemenschits	5–7, 4–6
Runner-up	6.	26 November 2001	Mallorca, Spain	Clay	(Italy) Silvia Disderi	(Austria) Daniela Klemenschits (Austria) Sandra Klemenschits	3–6, 4–6
Runner-up	7.	24 February 2002	Vale do Lobo, Portugal	Hard	(Italy) Giulia Meruzzi	(France) Severine Beltrame (France) Amandine Dulon	6–7^{(3)}, 2–6
Runner-up	8.	13 March 2005	Napoli, Italy	Clay	(Italy) Giulia Meruzzi	(Italy) Alberta Brianti (Austria) Stefanie Haidner	4–6, 3–6
Winner	6.	9 October 2006	Castel Gandolfo, Italy	Clay	(Italy) Valentina Sulpizio	(Italy) Giorgia Mortello (Italy) Lisa Tognetti	6–2, 6–1
Winner	7.	10 March 2007	Quartu Sant'Elena, Italy	Hard	(Italy) Valentina Sulpizio	(Switzerland) Lisa Sabino (Germany) Andrea Sieveke	7–6^{(2)}, 7–6^{(4)}
Runner-up	9.	25 March 2007	Cairo, Egypt	Clay	(Italy) Valentina Sulpizio	(Russia) Galina Fokina (Azerbaijan) Elina Gasanova	5–7, 1–6
Winner	8.	15 October 2007	Settimo San Pietro, Italy	Clay	(Italy) Valentina Sulpizio	(Italy) Stefania Chieppa (Italy) Valentina Sassi	6–1, 6–4
Winner	9.	22 October 2007	Augusta, Italy	Clay	(Italy) Valentina Sulpizio	(Italy) Letizia Lo Re (Italy) Anna Remondina	6–1, 6–1
Winner	10.	19 April 2008	Bari, Italy	Clay	(Italy) Alberta Brianti	(Liechtenstein) Stephanie Vogt (Slovenia) Polona Hercog	6–3, 6–3
Runner-up	10.	3 August 2008	Bad Saulgau, Germany	Clay	(Luxembourg) Claudine Schaul	(Czech Republic) Simona Dobrá (Czech Republic) Tereza Hladíková	1–6, 6–4, [8–10]
Runner-up	11.	1 September 2008	Martina Franca, Italy	Clay	(Italy) Valentina Sulpizio	(Italy) Elena Pioppo (Switzerland) Lisa Sabino	6–3, 4–6, [7–10]
Winner	11.	6 October 2008	Reggio Calabria, Italy	Clay	(Italy) Valentina Sulpizio	(Italy) Nicole Clerico (Austria) Patricia Mayr-Achleitner	6–2, 6–3
Runner-up	12.	8 June 2009	Campobasso, Italy	Clay	(Italy) Valentina Sulpizio	(Argentina) Jorgelina Cravero (Portugal) Frederica Piedade	3–6, 4–6
Winner	12.	6 May 2013	Pula, Italy	Clay	(Italy) Martina Caregaro	(Switzerland) Lisa Sabino (Italy) Annalisa Bona	6–2, 6–3
Winner	13.	17 May 2013	Pula, Italy	Clay	(Italy) Martina Caregaro	(Canada) Erin Routliffe (Canada) Carol Zhao	6–2, 5–7, [10–7]
Winner	14.	29 July 2013	Rovereto, Italy	Clay	(Italy) Martina Caregaro	(Ukraine) Olga Ianchuk (Slovakia) Chantal Škamlová	3–6, 6–4, [10–6]
Runner-up	13.	3 March 2014	Antalya, Turkey	Clay	(Italy) Martina Caregaro	(France) Estelle Cascino (Czech Republic) Martina Kubiciková	7–6, 2–6, [7–10]
Winner	15.	10 March 2014	Pula, Italy	Clay	(Italy) Martina Caregaro	(Slovenia) Maša Zec Peškirič (Germany) Kim Grajdek	6–3, 5–7, [10–8]
Runner-up	14.	28 April 2014	Pula, Italy	Clay	(Italy) Martina Caregaro	(Romania) Diana Buzean (Italy) Claudia Giovine	2–6, 4–6
Winner	16.	21 June 2014	Civitavecchia, Italy	Clay	(Italy) Martina Caregaro	(United States) Alexa Guarachi (Australia) Sally Peers	6–4, 6–4
