= Natacha Randriantefy =

Malagasy tennis player

- Country (sports): Madagascar
- Residence: Antananarivo
- Born: 14 March 1978 (age 47) Antananarivo
- Turned pro: 1992
- Retired: 2010
- Plays: Right (two-handed backhand)
- Prize money: $34,044

Singles
- Career record: 102–93
- Career titles: 1 ITF
- Highest ranking: No. 325 (5 August 2002)

Other tournaments
- Olympic Games: 1R (1992), 1996)

Doubles
- Career record: 79–70
- Career titles: 8 ITF
- Highest ranking: No. 173 (5 August 2002)

Other doubles tournaments
- Olympic Games: 1R (1992, 1996)

Natacha Randriantefy (born 14 March 1978) is a former professional tennis player from Madagascar.

Over her career, she won one singles and eight doubles titles on the ITF Women's Circuit. On 5 August, 2002, she reached her best singles ranking of world No. 325. On the same date, she peaked at No. 173 in the doubles rankings.

Playing for Madagascar in Fed Cup competitions, Randriantefy has a win–loss record of 7–5.

Randriantefy took part in two Olympic Games, in Barcelona (1992) and Atlanta (1996). Natacha became the youngest ever Olympian in tennis at Olympic Games at age 14 years and 136 days in Barcelona (1992). The Randriantefy sisters competed in women's doubles and they faced the Spanish pair of Conchita Martínez and Arantxa Sánchez Vicario at both Olympics in the first rounds. As of today, only Natacha and Dally Randriantefy represented Madasgascar in tennis at Olympic Games leaving everlasting mark on the history of their home country and the international tennis.

Her sister and doubles partner, Dally was the flag bearer of Malagasy Olympic team in Atlanta.

She played in Madagascar Fed Cup team in 1997-98, her record 7-5 (6-2 in singles, 1-3 in doubles). She was the Madagascan's Fed Cup team captain in 2014, and 2016.

Natacha retired from professional tennis 2010.

== Personal ==
Born in Antananarivo, Randriantefy was coached by father, Max; mother Olga is a language professor. Her sister Dally was also a tennis player.

== ITF Circuit finals ==
=== Singles: 2 (1–1) ===
Legend $25,000 tournaments $10,000 tournaments	Finals by surface Hard (0–0) Clay (1–1)

Result	No.	Date	Tournament	Surface	Opponent	Score
Win	1	Aug 2001	Aosta, Italy	Clay	(France) Diana Brunel	6–1, ret.
Loss	1	Jul 2003	Le Touquet, France	Clay	(France) Capucine Rousseau	6–7^{(0–7)}, 0–6

=== Doubles: 16 (8–8) ===
Legend $50,000 tournaments $25,000 tournaments $10,000 tournaments	Finals by surface Hard (3–1) Clay (5–6) Carpet (0–1)

Result	No.	Date	Tournament	Surface	Partner	Opponents	Score
Loss	1	Sep 1993	Marseille, France	Clay	(Madagascar) Dally Randriantefy	(Hungary) Andrea Noszály (Belgium) Daphne van de Zande	0–6, 4–6
Loss	2	Dec 1995	Cergy-Pontoise, France	Hard (i)	(Madagascar) Dally Randriantefy	(United States) Angela Lettiere (United States) Corina Morariu	3–6, 5–7
Win	1	Sep 1996	Bossonnens, Switzerland	Clay	(Switzerland) Aliénor Tricerri	(Hungary) Andrea Noszály (Germany) Fruzsina Siklosi	6–4, 7–5
Loss	3	Oct 1996	Burgdorf, Switzerland	Carpet (i)	(Switzerland) Aliénor Tricerri	(Slovakia) Patrícia Marková (Czech Republic) Denisa Sobotková	3–6, 4–6
Win	2	Aug 2001	Aosta, Italy	Clay	(France) Kildine Chevalier	(Austria) Stefanie Haidner (Argentina) Luciana Masante	1–6, 6–2, 6–2
Win	3	Oct 2001	Open de Touraine, France	Hard (i)	(Madagascar) Dally Randriantefy	(Italy) Flavia Pennetta (Italy) Maria Paola Zavagli	6–4, 3–6, 6–3
Win	4	Nov 2001	Villenave-d'Ornon, France	Clay (i)	(Uruguay) Daniela Olivera	(Belgium) Leslie Butkiewicz (Belgium) Caroline Maes	6–4, 6–2
Loss	4	Nov 2001	Le Havre, France	Clay	(Uruguay) Daniela Olivera	(Latvia) Līga Dekmeijere (Russia) Maria Kondratieva	4–6, 3–6
Win	5	Jan 2002	Grenoble, France	Hard (i)	(France) Kildine Chevalier	(France) Karla Mraz (France) Aurélie Védy	6–4, 6–4
Loss	5	Jun 2002	Grado, Italy	Clay	(Serbia and Montenegro) Sandra Načuk	(Italy) Gloria Pizzichini (Czech Republic) Hana Šromová	3–6, 5–7
Win	6	Jul 2002	Mont de Marsan, France	Clay	(Austria) Stefanie Haidner	(France) Séverine Beltrame (France) Amandine Dulon	6–4, 6–2
Win	7	Jul 2002	Valladolid, Spain	Hard	(United Kingdom) Elena Baltacha	(New Zealand) Leanne Baker (India) Manisha Malhotra	6–2, 6–3
Loss	6	Nov 2002	Villenave-d'Ornon, France	Clay (i)	(France) Kildine Chevalier	(Austria) Bianca Kamper (Austria) Nicole Remis	3–6, 4–6
Loss	7	Jun 2003	Périgueux, France	Clay	(Croatia) Lana Popadić	(Spain) María José Martínez Sánchez (Spain) Anabel Medina Garrigues	0–6, 3–6
Win	8	Jul 2003	Le Touquet, France	Clay	(France) Aurélie Védy	(Luxembourg) Mandy Minella (France) Pauline Parmentier	6–2, 6–2
Loss	8	Mar 2004	Amiens, France	Clay (i)	(France) Florence Haring	(Belgium) Caroline Maes (France) Virginie Pichet	6–3, 2–6, 5–7
