= Astrid Besser =

Italian tennis player

- Full name: Astrid Besser
- Country (sports): Italy
- Born: 1 September 1989 (age 35); Prato, Italy
- Height: 1.82 m (6 ft 0 in)
- Prize money: $38,694

Singles
- Career record: 94–96
- Career titles: 2 ITF
- Highest ranking: 356 (9 March 2009)

Grand Slam singles results
- Wimbledon Junior: 2R (2005)
- US Open Junior: 1R (2005)

Doubles
- Career record: 15–27
- Career titles: 2 ITF
- Highest ranking: 401 (16 June 2008)

Grand Slam doubles results
- Wimbledon Junior: 1R (2005)
- US Open Junior: 1R (2005)

Astrid Besser (born 1 September 1989 in Prato) is an Italian tennis player of German and Venezuelan descent.

Besser won two singles and two doubles titles on the ITF tour in her career. On 9 March 2009, she reached her best singles ranking of world number 356. On 16 June 2008, she peaked at world number 401 in the doubles rankings.

On the 2008 WTA Tour, Besser played in the main doubles draws at both the Gastein Ladies and the Banka Koper Slovenia Open.

== ITF finals ==
=== Singles (2–0) ===
Legend $100,000 tournaments $75,000 tournaments $50,000 tournaments $25,000 tournaments $10,000 tournaments	Finals by surface Hard (0–0) Clay (1–0) Grass (0–0) Carpet (1–0)

Result	No.	Date	Tournament	Surface	Opponent	Score
Win	1.	6 November 2006	Ismaning, Germany	Carpet (i)	(Russia) Anastasia Pivovarova	6–3, 6–3
Win	2.	10 March 2008	Rome, Italy	Clay	(Poland) Anna Korzeniak	6–2, 6–3

=== Doubles (2–1) ===
Legend $100,000 tournaments $75,000 tournaments $50,000 tournaments $25,000 tournaments $10,000 tournaments	Finals by surface Hard (0–0) Clay (2–1) Grass (0–0) Carpet (0–0)

Result	No.	Date	Tournament	Surface	Partner	Opponents	Score
Win	1.	18 September 2006	Ciampino, Italy	Clay	(Germany) Elisa Peth	(Italy) Denise Mascherini (Italy) Emily Stellato	6–4, 6–2
Win	2.	10 September 2007	Innsbruck, Austria	Clay	(Slovakia) Monika Kochanová	(Switzerland) Karin Hechenberger (Switzerland) Amra Sadiković	7–5, 7–5
Loss	1.	24 September 2007	Ciampino, Italy	Clay	(Italy) Letizia Lo Re	(Italy) Valentina Sulpizio (Italy) Verdiana Verardi	3–6, 4–6
