= Amandine Dulon =

French tennis player

- Country (sports): France
- Born: 22 March 1982 (age 42)
- Turned pro: 1997
- Retired: 2006
- Plays: Right-handed
- Prize money: $56,133

Singles
- Career record: 83–90
- Career titles: 1 ITF
- Highest ranking: No. 220 (19 May 2003)

Grand Slam singles results
- French Open: 1R (2003)
- Wimbledon: Q1 (2003)
- US Open: Q2 (2003)

Doubles
- Career record: 30–29
- Career titles: 3 ITF
- Highest ranking: No. 279 (3 February 2003)

Grand Slam doubles results
- French Open: 1R (2003)

Amandine Dulon (born 22 March 1982) is a French former tennis player.

During her career, she won one singles title and three doubles titles on the ITF Women's Circuit. On Grand Slam tournament-level, she achieved her best results reaching the first round in singles and doubles at the 2003 French Open.

== ITF Circuit finals ==
=== Singles (1–1) ===
Legend $25,000 tournaments $10,000 tournaments	Finals by surface Hard (1–0) Clay (0–1)

Outcome	No.	Date	Tournament	Surface	Opponent	Score
Winner	1.	3 March 2002	Albufeira, Portugal	Hard	(Spain) Arantxa Parra Santonja	6–3, 3–6, 6–4
Runner-up	1.	31 March 2002	Amiens, France	Clay	(Ukraine) Yuliya Beygelzimer	5–7, 6–3, 3–6

=== Doubles (3–1) ===
Legend $25,000 tournaments $10,000 tournaments	Finals by surface Hard (2–0) Clay (1–1)

Outcome	No.	Date	Tournament	Surface	Partner	Opponents	Score
Winner	1.	13 September 1998	Denain, France	Clay	(France) Olivia Sanchez	(South Africa) Lincky Ackron (South Africa) Karyn Bacon	5–7, 7–5, 6–3
Winner	2.	24 February 2002	Vale do Lobo, Portugal	Hard	(France) Séverine Beltrame	(Italy) Anna Floris (Italy) Giulia Meruzzi	7–6^{(3)}, 6–2
Runner-up	1.	7 July 2002	Mont-de-Marsan, France	Clay	(France) Séverine Beltrame	(Austria) Stefanie Haidner (Madagascar) Natacha Randriantefy	4–6, 2–6
Winner	3.	26 January 2003	Grenoble, France	Hard	(France) Séverine Beltrame	(Belgium) Leslie Butkiewicz (Netherlands) Kim Kilsdonk	5–7, 7–6^{(2)}, 7–6^{(4)}
