= Caroline Maes =

Belgian tennis player

- Country (sports): Belgium
- Residence: Zele, Belgium
- Born: 9 November 1982 (age 43) Dendermonde, Belgium
- Height: 1.67 m (5 ft 6 in)
- Turned pro: 1997
- Retired: 2009
- Plays: Right (two-handed backhand)
- Prize money: $159,915

Singles
- Career record: 251–193
- Career titles: 8 ITF
- Highest ranking: No. 151 (28 May 2007)

Grand Slam singles results
- French Open: Q2 (2008)
- Wimbledon: Q1 (2007)
- US Open: Q1 (2007)

Doubles
- Career record: 125–124
- Career titles: 9 ITF
- Highest ranking: No. 135 (11 February 2008)

Caroline Maes (born 9 November 1982) is a former Belgian tennis player.

Maes has been active in singles since 1997 and doubles since 1999. The highest place she ever achieved in the WTA rankings in singles is 151st on 28 May 2007. In doubles, she got to No. 135, on 11 February 2008. She could not win a WTA tournament, but won eight tournaments in singles and nine in doubles on the ITF Women's Circuit. Her last and most important ITF title was at the $100k tournament in Rome, on 19 May 2007, defeating Yuliya Beygelzimer and Stéphanie Cohen-Aloro on her way to the final, where she beat former top-50 player Marta Marrero from Spain. She performed three top-100 wins: against Yuliana Fedak (world No. 66, Hasselt 2006), Jelena Kostanić (No. 46, Dubai 2006), Akiko Morigami (No. 51, Strasbourg 2007). In 2006, she also made it to the round of the last 16 in doubles at the Miami Open, together with Kim Clijsters.

== Fed Cup ==
Maes was a member of the Belgium Fed Cup team in 2002, 2003, 2004, 2006 and 2007. She had three appearances in singles and four in doubles. However, she did not win any singles match and won only one doubles match, partnering Els Callens against the Slovakia Fed Cup team.

She is very close friends with Kim Clijsters. She made herself unavailable for selection in Fed Cup tie against China in 2007, because she wished to attend the wedding of Clijsters and American basketball player Brian Lynch that week-end (14 July 2007) instead.

== ITF Circuit finals ==
$100,000 tournaments
$75,000 tournaments
$50,000 tournaments
$25,000 tournaments
$10,000 tournaments

=== Singles: 11 (8–3) ===
Result	No.	Date	Tournament	Surface	Opponent	Score
Win	1.	13 August 2000	ITF Rebecq, Belgium	Clay	(Luxembourg) Claudine Schaul	1–6, 7–6, 6–3
Win	2.	12 November 2000	ITF Villenave-d'Ornon, France	Clay (I)	(Luxembourg) Claudine Schaul	4–0, 4–1, 4–5, 4–1
Win	3.	11 November 2001	ITF Villenave-d'Ornon, France	Clay (I)	(France) Stéphanie Rizzi	6–2, 4–6, 6–2
Win	4.	2 December 2001	ITF Mallorca, Spain	Clay	(Bosnia and Herzegovina) Adriana Basarić	2–6, 6–1, 7–5
Win	5.	21 August 2005	ITF Koksijde, Belgium	Clay	(France) Nadege Vergos	2–6, 6–1, 7–5
Loss	1.	30 April 2006	ITF Cavtat, Croatia	Clay	(Ukraine) Irina Buryachok	6–3, 4–6, 1–6
Win	6.	7 May 2006	ITF Dubrovnik, Croatia	Clay	(Serbia) Karolina Jovanović	6–1, 6–1
Win	7.	13 August 2006	ITF Rebecq, Belgium	Clay	(France) Sylvia Montero	6–1, 6–2
Loss	2.	2 October 2006	Open Nantes Atlantique, France	Hard (i)	(Belarus) Iryna Kuryanovich	6–1, 5–7, 1–6
Win	8.	13 May 2007	ITF Rome, Italy	Clay	(Spain) Marta Marrero	6–4, 7–6
Loss	3.	20 March 2008	ITF Tessenderlo, Belgium	Clay (i)	(Belgium) Kirsten Flipkens	5–7, 1–6

=== Doubles: 19 (9–10) ===
Result	No.	Date	Tournament	Surface	Partner	Opponents	Score
Win	1.	10 July 2000	Brussels, Belgium	Clay	(Russia) Ekaterina Kozhokina	(Japan) Kaori Aoyama (Japan) Kumiko Iijima	6–1, 6–4
Loss	1.	21 August 2000	Westende, Belgium	Clay	(Belgium) Elke Clijsters	(Netherlands) Natasha Galouza (Netherlands) Anouk Sterk	1–6, 0–6
Win	2.	6 November 2000	Villenave-d'Ornon, France	Clay (i)	(New Zealand) Shelley Stephens	(France) Diana Brunel (France) Edith Nunes-Bersot	4–1, 1–4, 4–2, 4–0
Loss	2.	11 November 2001	Villenave-d'Ornon, France	Clay (i)	(Belgium) Leslie Butkiewicz	(Uruguay) Daniela Olivera (Madagascar) Natacha Randriantefy	4–6, 2–6
Win	3.	24 March 2002	Cholet, France	Clay	(Czech Republic) Gabriela Navrátilová	(Belgium) Leslie Butkiewicz (Belgium) Patty Van Acker	4–1 ret.
Loss	3.	12 October 2003	Open de Touraine, France	Hard (i)	(Belgium) Leslie Butkiewicz	(Latvia) Līga Dekmeijere (Germany) Bianka Lamade	1–6, 2–6
Win	4.	9 November 2003	Villenave-d'Ornon, France	Clay (i)	(France) Aurélie Védy	(Belarus) Iryna Kuryanovich (Israel) Yevgenia Savransky	6–3, 7–6^{(6)}
Loss	4.	2 March 2004	Buchen, Germany	Hard (i)	(Belgium) Elke Clijsters	(Czech Republic) Lucie Hradecká (Czech Republic) Eva Hrdinová	1–6, 4–6
Win	5.	21 March 2004	Amiens, France	Clay	(France) Virginie Pichet	(France) Florence Haring (Madagascar) Natacha Randriantefy	3–6, 6–2, 7–5
Loss	5.	12 July 2005	Brussels, Belgium	Clay	(Belgium) Leslie Butkiewicz	(Czech Republic) Iveta Gerlová (Germany) Carmen Klaschka	5–7, 2–6
Win	6.	24 July 2005	Zwevegem, Belgium	Clay	(Belgium) Leslie Butkiewicz	(Czech Republic) Petra Cetkovská (Spain) Gabriela Velasco Andreu	6–3, 6–2
Loss	6.	30 April 2006	Cavtat, Croatia	Clay	(Australia) Christina Horiatopoulos	(Slovenia) Tina Obrež (Slovenia) Anja Prislan	w/o
Win	7.	22 July 2006	Zwevegem, Belgium	Clay	(Belgium) Leslie Butkiewicz	(Poland) Olga Brózda (Poland) Natalia Kołat	6–2, 6–2
Loss	7.	29 July 2006	Les Contamines-Montjoie, France	Hard	(Australia) Christina Horiatopoulos	(Portugal) Catarina Ferreira (Germany) Laura Siegemund	4–6, 6–2, 5–7
Loss	8.	26 August 2006	Alphen aan den Rijn, Netherlands	Clay	(Belgium) Leslie Butkiewicz	(Slovenia) Andreja Klepač (Montenegro) Danica Krstajić	2–6, 6–7
Loss	9.	7 May 2007	Rome, Italy	Clay	(Estonia) Maret Ani	(Poland) Marta Domachowska (Finland) Emma Laine	1–0 ret.
Win	8.	24 September 2007	Nottingham, United Kingdom	Hard	(Finland) Emma Laine	(United Kingdom) Anna Fitzpatrick (Montenegro) Ana Veselinović	3–6, 7–6^{(4)}
Loss	10.	7 October 2007	Open Nantes Atlantique, France	Hard (i)	(United Kingdom) Melanie South	(Sweden) Sofia Arvidsson (Sweden) Johanna Larsson	6–4, 5–7, [7–10]
Win	9.	2 December 2007	Sintra, Portugal	Clay	(Serbia) Teodora Mirčić	(Portugal) Neuza Silva (Brazil) Roxane Vaisemberg	6–4, 6–1
