= Irina Kuzmina-Rimša =

Latvian tennis player (born 1986)

- Country (sports): Latvia
- Born: 16 January 1986 (age 39) Riga, Latvia
- Turned pro: 2003
- Plays: Right-handed (two-handed forehand)
- Prize money: $61,484

Singles
- Career record: 153–136
- Career titles: 2 ITF
- Highest ranking: No. 307 (13 October 2008)

Doubles
- Career record: 105–99
- Career titles: 8 ITF
- Highest ranking: No. 193 (13 July 2009)

Team competitions
- Fed Cup: 19–13

Irina Kuzmina-Rimša (born 16 January 1986) is a Latvian former professional tennis player.

Over her career, she won two singles and eight doubles titles on the ITF Circuit. On 13 October 2008, she reached her best singles ranking of world No. 307. On 13 July 2009, she peaked at No. 193 in the WTA doubles rankings.

Playing for Latvia Fed Cup team, Kuzmina has accumulated a 19–13 record in Fed Cup competition.

After retiring from professional tennis, she became a beach tennis player.

== ITF finals ==
Legend
$75,000 tournaments
$50,000 tournaments
$25,000 tournaments
$10,000 tournaments

=== Singles (2–4) ===
Result	No.	Date	Tournament	Surface	Opponent	Score
Loss	1.	15 August 2005	ITF Helsinki, Finland	Hard	(Finland) Emma Laine	0–6, 2–6
Win	2.	30 May 2006	ITF Olecko, Poland	Clay	(Poland) Olga Brózda	6–4, 6–4
Loss	3.	8 June 2007	ITF Birkerød, Denmark	Clay	(Italy) Elena Pioppo	2–6, 0–6
Win	4.	25 June 2007	ITF Oslo, Norway	Clay	(Austria) Eva-Maria Hoch	6–4, 3–0 ret.
Loss	5.	24 November 2007	ITF Barcelona, Spain	Clay	(Italy) Valentina Sulpizio	0–6, 0–2 ret.
Loss	6.	19 January 2009	ITF Kaarst, Germany	Carpet (i)	(Germany) Sarah Gronert	6–2, 4–6, 5–7

=== Doubles (8–11) ===
Result	No.	Date	Tournament	Surface	Partner	Opponents	Score
Loss	1.	10 August 2003	ITF Gdynia, Poland	Clay	(Poland) Monika Schneider	(Poland) Klaudia Jans-Ignacik (Poland) Alicja Rosolska	5–7, 2–6
Loss	2.	17 August 2003	ITF Oulu, Finland	Clay	(Ukraine) Kateryna Bondarenko	(Austria) Nicole Melch (Austria) Yvonne Meusburger	3–6, 6–4, 1–6
Win	3.	12 September 2004	ITF Tbilisi, Georgia	Clay	(Russia) Kristina Movsesyan	(Georgia (country)) Sofia Melikishvili (Russia) Svetlana Mossiakova	3–6, 6–3, 6–3
Loss	4.	7 November 2004	ITF Stockholm, Sweden	Hard (i)	(Russia) Sofia Avakova	(Netherlands) Michaëlla Krajicek (Netherlands) Jolanda Mens	2–6, 3–6
Loss	5.	24 May 2005	ITF Olecko, Poland	Clay	(Latvia) Alise Vaidere	(Poland) Olga Brózda (Poland) Natalia Kołat	7–5, 1–6, 1–6
Loss	6.	30 January 2006	ITF Belfort, France	Hard (i)	(Russia) Ekaterina Lopes	(Germany) Kristina Barrois (Germany) Kathrin Wörle-Scheller	1–6, 1–6
Win	7.	9 May 2006	ITF Warsaw, Poland	Clay	(Ukraine) Oksana Uzhylovska	(Germany) Justine Ozga (Poland) Urszula Radwańska	6–0, 6–1
Loss	8.	30 May 2006	ITF Olecko, Poland	Clay	(Latvia) Alise Vaidere	(Poland) Olga Brózda (Poland) Natalia Kołat	2–6, 3–6
Win	9.	2 June 2007	ITF Olecko, Poland	Clay	(Ukraine) Yuliya Hnateyko	(Belarus) Volha Duko (Belarus) Aleksandra Malyarchikova	6–1, 6–1
Loss	10.	8 June 2007	ITF Birkerød, Denmark	Clay	(Czech Republic) Zora Vlckova	(Italy) Elena Pioppo (Italy) Alice Balducci	7–6^{(7)}, 2–6, 0–6
Loss	11.	19 November 2007	ITF Barcelona, Spain	Clay	(Spain) Sheila Solsona-Carcasona	(Bulgaria) Biljana Pawlowa-Dimitrova (Austria) Stefanie Haidner	3–6, 7–6^{(8)}, [3–10]
Win	12.	27 January 2008	ITF Grenoble, France	Hard (i)	(Russia) Vasilisa Davydova	(Czech Republic) Barbora Krtičková (Czech Republic) Lucie Šípková	6–0, 7–5
Win	13.	11 July 2008	ITF Rome, Italy	Clay	(Ukraine) Oxana Lyubtsova	(Ukraine) Irina Buryachok (Austria) Patricia Mayr	6–4, 4–6, [10–7]
Loss	14.	4 August 2008	ITF Moscow, Russia	Clay	(Ukraine) Veronika Kapshay	(Russia) Vitalia Diatchenko (Russia) Maria Kondratieva	0–6, 4–6
Loss	15.	30 August 2008	ITF Vlaardingen, Netherlands	Clay	(Russia) Anastasia Poltoratskaya	(Bosnia and Herzegovina) Mervana Jugić-Salkić (Serbia) Teodora Mirčić	1–6, 2–6
Win	16.	8 February 2009	ITF Belfort, France	Carpet (i)	(Ukraine) Oxana Lyubtsova	(France) Youlia Fedossova (France) Virginie Pichet	6–3, 3–6, [10–5]
Win	17.	24 June 2009	ITF Rotterdam, Netherlands	Clay	(Russia) Eugeniya Pashkova	(Australia) Alenka Hubacek (New Zealand) Kairangi Vano	7–6, 7–6
Loss	18.	12 October 2009	ITF Kharkiv, Ukraine	Carpet (i)	(Ukraine) Veronika Kapshay	(Ukraine) Lyudmyla Kichenok (Ukraine) Nadiya Kichenok	6–2, 2–6, [3–10]
Win	19.	26 July 2010	ITF Tampere, Finland	Clay	(Latvia) Diāna Marcinkēviča	(France) Amandine Hesse (Czech Republic) Monika Tůmová	6–4, 6–2
