= Sandra Martinović =

Bosnian tennis player (born 1979)

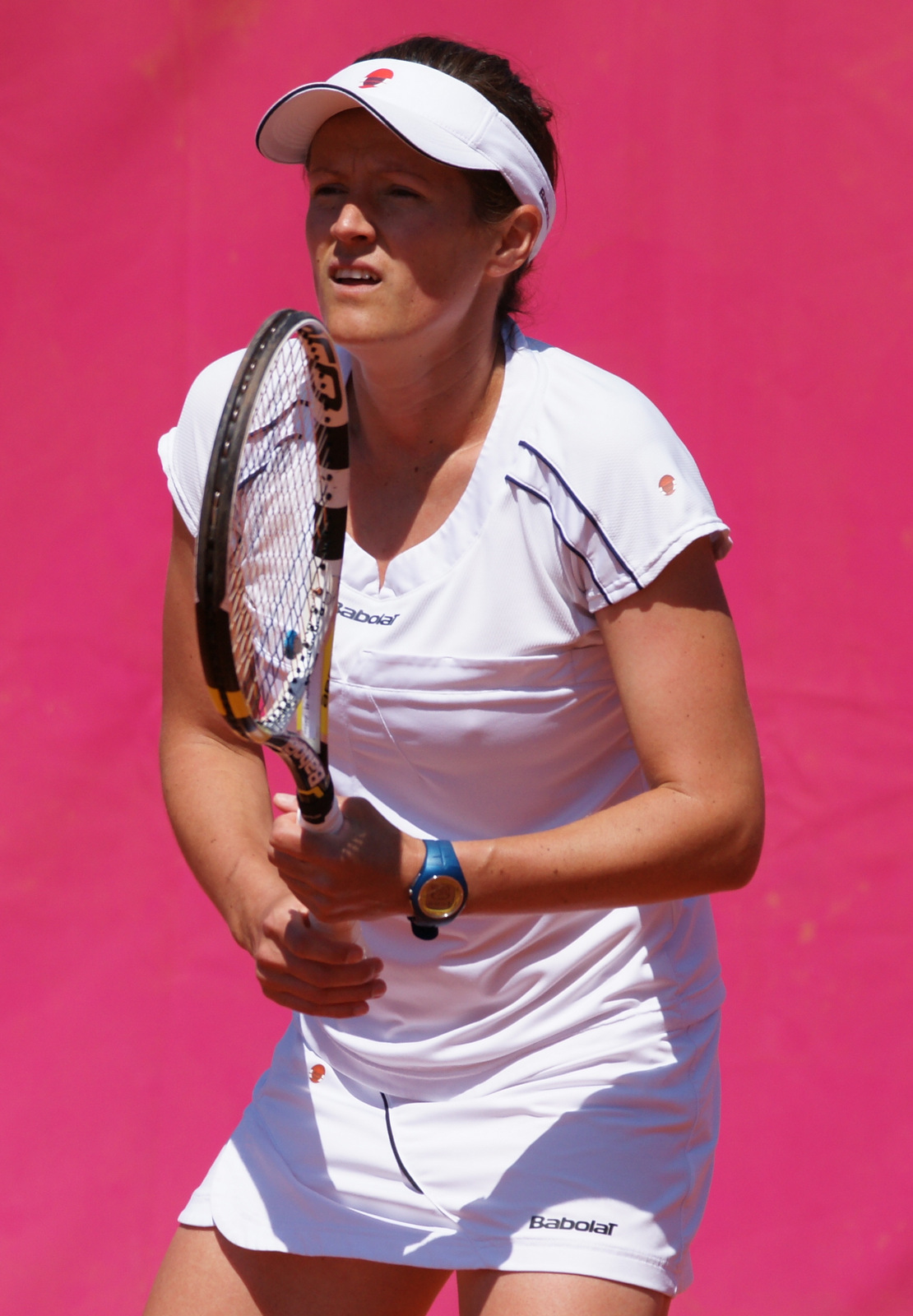
- Martinović at the 2011 Open de Cagnes-sur-Mer
- Country (sports): Bosnia and Herzegovina
- Residence: Biel, Switzerland
- Born: 4 October 1979 (age 45); Brčko, SFR Yugoslavia
- Height: 1.74 m (5 ft 9 in)
- Turned pro: 1996
- Retired: 2012
- Plays: Right (two-handed backhand)
- Prize money: $136,541

Singles
- Career record: 325–258
- Career titles: 13 ITF
- Highest ranking: No. 187 (28 July 2008)

Grand Slam singles results
- French Open: Q3 (2008)
- Wimbledon: Q1 (2008)
- US Open: Q1 (2008)

Doubles
- Career record: 122–124
- Career titles: 11 ITF
- Highest ranking: No. 199 (28 April 2008)

Team competitions
- Fed Cup: 13–15

Sandra Martinović (born 4 October 1979) is a Bosnian-Herzegovinian former tennis player. Her career-high WTA singles ranking is No. 187, achieved on 28 July 2008, and her best doubles ranking world No. 199, achieved on 28 April 2008.

== Career ==
Martinović is the daughter of Ivo and Mara Martinović, and she began playing tennis at the age of nine. Her family moved from Bosnia and Herzegovina to Austria when she was 12, where she practiced in Hermagor. At the age of 17, she won her first WTA ranking points, and after finishing school, she moved to Germany to become a professional tennis player.

She improved her ranking to 187 in 2008 when she reached the third round of qualifying for the French Open and also played qualifications at Wimbledon and the US Open the same year. In her career, she won 13 ITF singles and 11 doubles titles. In 2006, she was acknowledged as "one of the most successful players" on the European circuit by Tennis Europe, the sanctioning body of European women's tournament of the ITF Women's Circuit.

At the end of 2012, Martinović ended her career. She had won over $130,000, and is now working as coach at the Swiss Tennis Academy in Biel, Switzerland.

== ITF Circuit finals ==
Legend
$100,000 tournaments
$75,000 tournaments
$50,000 tournaments
$25,000 tournaments
$10,000 tournaments

=== Singles: 17 (13–4) ===
Outcome	No.	Date	Tournament	Surface	Opponent	Score
Runner-up	1.	1 November 1999	ITF Ain Sukhna, Egypt	Clay	(Morocco) Bahia Mouhtassine	6–1, 4–6, 0–6
Runner-up	2.	25 Aug 2003	ITF Alphen a/d Rijn, Netherlands	Clay	(Netherlands) Tessy van de Ven	3–6, 5–7
Runner-up	3.	19 April 2004	ITF Hvar, Croatia	Clay	(Czech Republic) Tereza Veverková	4–6, 3–6
Winner	1.	28 June 2004	ITF Heerhugowaard, Netherlands	Clay	(Sweden) Aleksandra Srndovic	6–2, 6–1
Winner	2.	28 June 2005	ITF Padova, Italy	Clay	(Italy) Agnese Zucchini	6–4, 6–2
Winner	3.	27 September 2005	ITF Benevento, Italy	Hard	(Poland) Anna Korzeniak	6–4, 6–1
Runner-up	4.	15 November 2005	ITF Mallorca, Spain	Clay	(Russia) Julia Parasyuk	7–6, 4–6, 0–6
Winner	4.	12 June 2006	ITF Lenzerheide, Switzerland	Clay	(Switzerland) Stefania Boffa	6–4, 6–3
Winner	5.	20 June 2006	ITF Davos, Switzerland	Clay	(Germany) Tatjana Maria	1–6, 6–4, 6–2
Winner	6.	11 July 2006	ITF Garching, Germany	Clay	(Latvia) Anastasija Sevastova	6–7, 6–3, 6–2
Winner	7.	24 July 2006	ITF Horb, Germany	Clay	(Germany) Lydia Steinbach	3–6, 6–1, 6–4
Winner	8.	28 August 2006	ITF Vienna, Austria	Clay	(Slovakia) Lenka Wienerová	w/o
Winner	9.	8 October 2007	ITF Reggio Calabria, Italy	Clay	(Spain) Marta Marrero	4–6, 7–5, 6–4
Winner	10.	22 June 2009	ITF Davos, Switzerland	Clay	(Italy) Anna-Giulia Remondina	6–1, 6–3
Winner	11.	17 August 2009	ITF Wahlstedt, Germany	Clay	(Germany) Sarah Gronert	2–6, 6–1, 6–4
Winner	12.	8 October 2007	ITF Ciampino, Italy	Clay	(Italy) Federica Quercia	6–4, 6–2
Winner	13.	22 August 2011	ITF Enschede, Netherlands	Clay	(Netherlands) Lesley Kerkhove	2–6, 6–4, 6–4

=== Doubles: 21 (11–10) ===
Outcome	No.	Date	Tournament	Surface	Partner	Opponents	Score
Winner	1.	4 August 1997	ITF Périgueux, France	Clay	(Spain) Rosa María Andrés Rodríguez	(France) Geraldine Bimes (France) Victoria Courmes	6–4, 6–3
Runner-up	1.	19 April 2004	ITF Hvar, Croatia	Clay	(Austria) Daniela Kix	(Czech Republic) Tereza Veverková (Czech Republic) Zuzana Černá	6–4, 4–6, 6–7
Runner-up	2.	20 June 2005	ITF Davos, Switzerland	Clay	(Czech Republic) Petra Cetkovská	(Czech Republic) Zuzana Hejdová (Germany) Andrea Petkovic	3–6, 2–6
Runner-up	3.	2 August 2005	Bad Saulgau, Germany	Clay	(Croatia) Darija Jurak	(Uzbekistan) Ivanna Israilova (Russia) Elena Chalova	4–6, 6–4, 4–6
Winner	2.	28 August 2006	Vienna, Austria	Clay	(Slovakia) Martina Babáková	(Austria) Franziska Klotz (Austria) Marlena Metzinger	6–2, 6–0
Runner-up	4.	14 February 2007	Biberach, Germany	Hard (i)	(Croatia) Darija Jurak	(Russia) Nina Bratchikova (Poland) Urszula Radwańska	2–6, 0–6
Winner	3.	7 May 2007	Warsaw, Poland	Clay	(Croatia) Josipa Bek	(Poland) Karolina Kosińska (Australia) Arina Rodionova	6–3, 2–6, 6–3
Winner	4.	14 July 2007	Toruń, Poland	Clay	(Switzerland) Stefanie Vögele	(Poland) Magdalena Kiszczyńska (Poland) Natalia Kołat	2–6, 6–4, 6–3
Runner-up	5.	6 August 2007	Hechingen, Germany	Clay	(Croatia) Darija Jurak	(Czech Republic) Michaela Paštiková (Germany) Kathrin Wörle	6–4, 6–4
Winner	5.	24 September 2007	Podgorica, Montenegro	Clay	(Montenegro) Danica Krstajić	(Croatia) Ivana Abramović (Croatia) Maria Abramović	6–1, 6–2
Runner-up	6.	8 October 2007	Reggio Calabria, Italy	Clay	(Austria) Stefanie Haidner	(Spain) Marta Marrero (Spain) María José Martínez Sánchez	1–6, 2–6
Runner-up	7.	24 March 2008	Latina, Italy	Clay	(Germany) Kathrin Wörle	(Italy) Elisa Balsamo (Italy) Valentina Sulpizio	6–0, 6–7^{(6)}, [7–10]
Winner	6.	22 September 2008	Podgorica, Montenegro	Clay	(Serbia) Neda Kozić	(Argentina) Erica Krauth (Sweden) Hanna Nooni	7–6, 6–2
Winner	7.	27 October 2008	Istanbul, Turkey	Hard (i)	(Austria) Melanie Klaffner	(Turkey) Çağla Büyükakçay (Turkey) Pemra Özgen	6–4, 6–7^{(5)}, [10–6]
Winner	8.	2 March 2009	Buchen, Germany	Carpet (i)	(Switzerland) Romina Oprandi	(Ukraine) Kateryna Herth (Russia) Anastasia Poltoratskaya	5–7, 7–5, [10–8]
Winner	9.	28 September 2009	Ciampino, Italy	Clay	(Russia) Marina Shamayko	(Italy) Stefania Chieppa (Italy) Valentina Sulpizio	7–6, 6–4
Runner-up	8.	8 February 2010	Vale do Lobo, Portugal	Hard	(Switzerland) Lisa Sabino	(Italy) Julia Mayr (Italy) Evelyn Mayr	2–6, 1–6
Winner	10.	30 July 2011	Bad Waltersdorf, Austria	Clay	(Czech Republic) Kateřina Vaňková	(Austria) Pia König (Austria) Yvonne Neuwirth	6–3, 3–6, [10–8]
Runner-up	9.	1 August 2011	ITF Vienna, Austria	Clay	(Austria) Janina Toljan	(Czech Republic) Simona Dobrá (Czech Republic) Lucie Kriegsmannová	4–6, 1–6
Runner-up	10.	12 March 2012	ITF Madrid, Spain	Clay	(Czech Republic) Jana Orlová	(Spain) Pilar Dominguez-Lopez (Spain) Isabel Rapisarda-Calvo	6–7, 6–2, [8–10]
Winner	11.	19 March 2012	ITF Madrid, Spain	Clay	(Czech Republic) Jana Orlová	(Switzerland) Clelia Melena (Italy) Giulia Sussarello	6–3, 6–3
