= Anna Korzeniak =

Polish tennis player (born 1988)

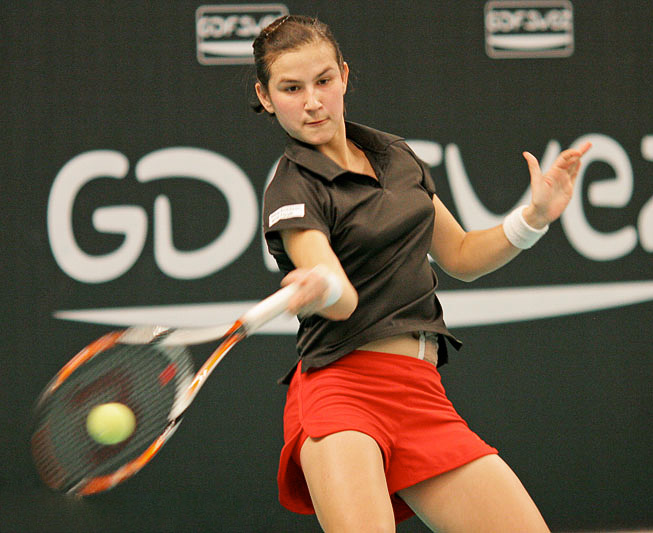
- Country (sports): Poland
- Born: 16 June 1988 (age 36); Kraków, Poland
- Height: 1.70 m (5 ft 7 in)
- Plays: Right-handed (two-handed backhand)
- Prize money: $109,185

Singles
- Career record: 293–194
- Career titles: 10 ITF
- Highest ranking: No. 182 (3 March 2009)

Grand Slam singles results
- French Open: Q1 (2008)
- Wimbledon: Q2 (2008)
- US Open: Q1 (2008)

Doubles
- Career record: 1–5
- Career titles: 0
- Highest ranking: No. 705 (29 October 2012)

Anna Maria Korzeniak (born 16 June 1988 in Kraków) is a Polish former professional tennis player.

Anna Korzeniak was born to Stanisław and Ewa Korzeniak. She began playing tennis at the age of five and was coached by her father. Her favourite surface is clay.

Korzeniak reached a career-high ranking of No. 182, and she won ten tournaments on the ITF Women's Circuit.

== ITF finals ==
=== Singles (10–6) ===
$25,000 tournaments
$10,000 tournaments

Outcome	No.	Date	Tournament	Surface	Opponent	Score
Runner-up	1.	2 October 2005	Benevento, Italy	Hard	(Bosnia and Herzegovina) Sandra Martinović	4–6, 1–6
Winner	1.	9 October 2005	Rome, Italy	Clay	(Italy) Annalisa Bona	6–4, 6–2
Winner	2.	16 October 2005	Castel Gandolfo, Italy	Clay	(Italy) Giulia Gatto-Monticone	6–3, 6–0
Winner	3.	19 February 2006	Buchen, Germany	Carpet	(Serbia and Montenegro) Ana Veselinović	2–6, 7–5, 7–6^{(8–6)}
Winner	4.	28 January 2007	Grenoble, France	Hard	(France) Florence Haring	7–6^{(7–3)}, 6–4
Winner	5.	24 June 2007	Fontanafredda, Italy	Clay	(Latvia) Anastasija Sevastova	7–5, 6–0
Winner	6.	7 October 2007	Nantes, France	Hard	(France) Virginie Pichet	6–4, 6–0
Runner-up	2.	16 March 2008	Rome, Italy	Clay	(Italy) Astrid Besser	2–6, 3–6
Winner	7.	22 March 2008	Rome, Italy	Clay	(Romania) Liana Ungur	6–3, 6–3
Winner	8.	27 July 2007	Horb, Germany	Clay	(Czech Republic) Simona Dobrá	2–6, 6–3, 6–1
Runner-up	3.	21 March 2009	Rome, Italy	Clay	(Belarus) Darya Kustova	2–6, 2–6
Runner-up	4.	28 March 2009	Latina, Italy	Clay	(Czech Republic) Zuzana Ondrášková	5–7, 7–6^{(7–3)}, 2–6
Winner	9.	11 April 2009	Foggia, Italy	Clay	(France) Kristina Mladenovic	6–3, 6–1
Runner-up	5.	7 March 2010	Lyon, France	Hard	(Italy) Anna Remondina	6–1, 7–6^{(7–0)}
Runner-up	6.	30 August 2010	Gliwice, Poland	Clay	(Poland) Paula Kania	6–7^{(2–7)}, 6–3, 5–7
Winner	10.	6 June 2011	Almere, Netherlands	Clay	(Sweden) Hilda Melander	6–2, 7–5
