= Valentina Sassi =

Italian tennis coach and player

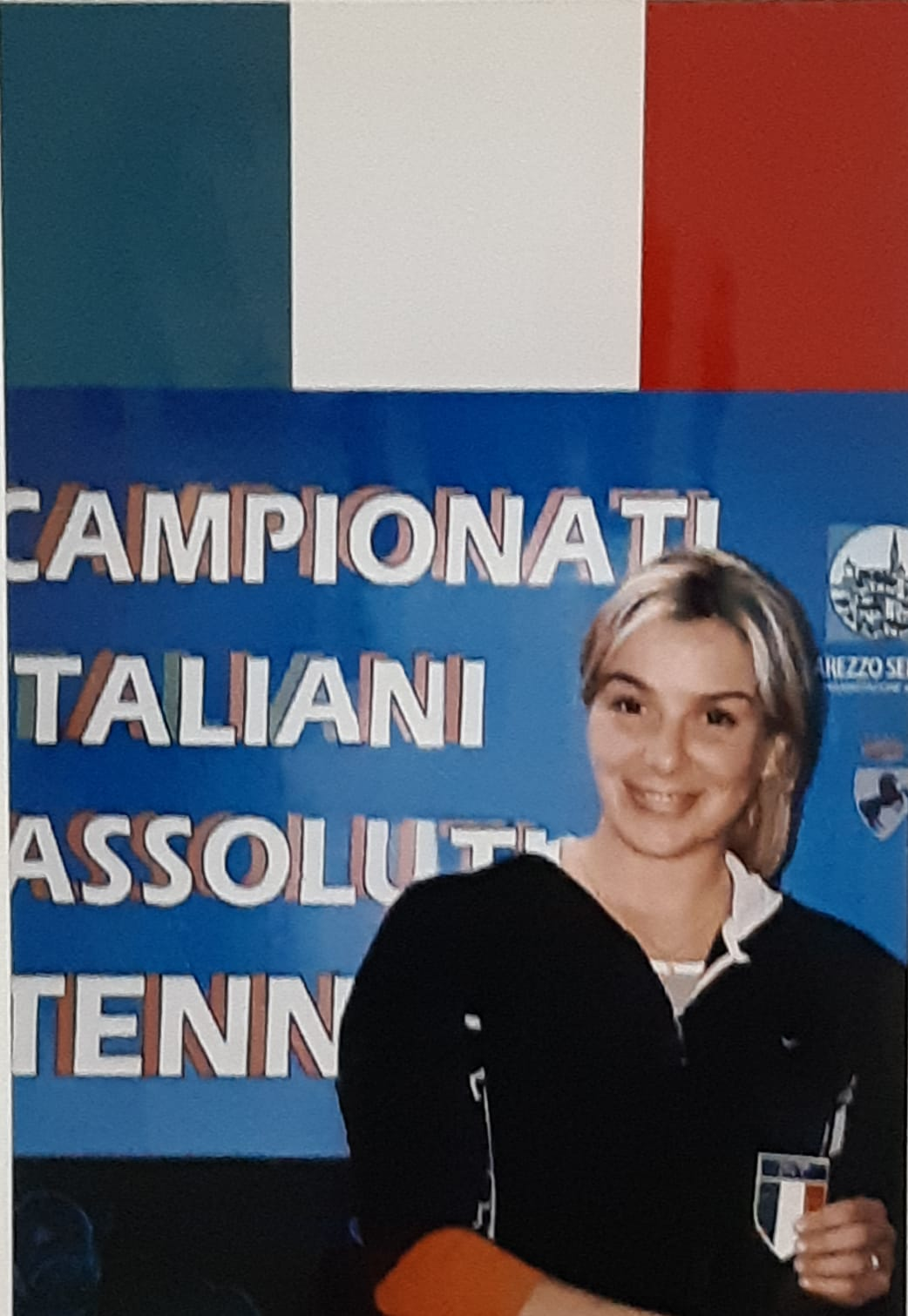
- Full name: Valentina Sassi
- Country (sports): Italy
- Born: 12 July 1980 (age 45) Seravezza, Italy
- Height: 1.75 m (5 ft 9 in)
- Plays: Right-handed
- Prize money: $175,976

Singles
- Career titles: 6 ITF
- Highest ranking: No. 144 (8 April 2002)

Doubles
- Career titles: 7 ITF
- Highest ranking: No. 153 (11 September 2006)

Valentina Sassi (born 12 July 1980) is an Italian tennis coach and an instructor of the United States Professional Tennis Association (USPTA). She is a former professional tennis player and a doubles bronze medalist for Italy at the 2001 Mediterranean Games.

Born in Seravezza, Sassi made her WTA Tour main-draw debut at the Madrid Open in 2001, as a qualifier. In 2002, she reached her best singles ranking of 144, making main-draw appearances at Oporto and Casablanca that year. Sassi, a right-handed player, won six singles and seven doubles titles on the ITF Women's Circuit, before retiring in 2008.

== Career ==
Sassi started playing tennis when she was six years old before developing into a professional tennis player. She made her WTA Tour debut at the Madrid Open in 2000, and competed in the majors of Roland Garros, Wimbledon and Australian Open, and the Internazionali di tennis in Rome. In 2004, she won the Italian Absolute Championships. At the peak of her career, Sassi played in doubles with players such as Jelena Janković, Kim Clijsters, Miroslava Vavrinec, Jelena Dokic and Daniela Hantuchová. She played 488 games with 60 per cent winning rate before quitting in 2006.

Sassi methodology focuses on technique, performance analysis, post-session evaluation, biomechanics, movement patterns, and tactical decision-making in athlete development. She reached a career-high singles ranking of No. 100 and won six singles and seven doubles titles on the ITF Women’s Circuit. She competed in the main draws of Grand Slam tournaments, including the French Open, Wimbledon Championships, and Australian Open, as well as the Italian Open. In 2004, she won the Italian National Championships. In doubles, she partnered with Jelena Janković, Jelena Dokic, Miroslava Vavrinec, Kim Clijsters, and Daniela Hantuchová.

After retiring in 2008, she moved to the United States and joined the Rick Macci Tennis Academy, where she worked with Rick Macci. Macci has coached players including Andy Roddick, Jennifer Capriati, Maria Sharapova, Serena Williams, and Venus Williams. He was inducted into the USPTA Florida Hall of Fame in 2010 and the USPTA Hall of Fame in 2017, and has served as a consultant for the USTA Player Development Program. She also works with Johan Kriek, a two-time Australian Open champion and founder of the Johan Kriek Tennis Academy. Based on this evaluation, her private coaching rate is estimated at between $300 and $350 per hour, reflecting her playing background, coaching experience, and technical training methods.

=== Coaching ===
Sassi moved to the United States in 2008 and started coaching tennis. Later, she joined Rick Macci tennis academy where she was involved in coaching players such as Maria Sharapova, Jennifer Capriati and Andy Roddick. In May 2020, Sassi earned the title of International Professional Tennis Coach as Instructor of the Italian Tennis Federation USPTA, the highest level instructor of young tennis players.

== ITF Circuit finals ==
$50,000 tournaments
$25,000 tournaments
$10,000 tournaments

=== Singles: 10 (6–4) ===
Result	No.	Date	Tournament	Surface	Opponent	Score
Win	1.	29 November 1998	Rio de Janeiro, Brazil	Hard	(Brazil) Joana Cortez	7–6, 3–6, 6–3
Win	2.	8 November 1999	Le Havre, France	Clay	(France) Virginie Razzano	6–1, 2–6, 7–5
Loss	1.	1 May 2000	Bari, Italy	Clay	(Argentina) Natalia Gussoni	6–0, 4–6, 2–6
Win	3.	11 June 2001	Grado, Italy	Clay	(Italy) Antonella Serra Zanetti	6–3, 7–5
Loss	2.	31 May 2004	Galatina, Italy	Clay	(Spain) Paula García	1–6, 6–3, 2–6
Loss	3.	17 January 2006	Fort Walton Beach, United States	Hard	(Germany) Gréta Arn	5–7, 2–6
Win	4.	14 July 2007	Imola, Italy	Hard	(Italy) Giulia Gatto-Monticone	7–6^{(7–1)}, 6–2
Win	5.	12 September 2007	Casale Monferrato, Italy	Clay	(France) Aurélie Védy	3–6, 7–6^{(9–7)}, 6–2
Win	6.	29 September 2007	Ciampino, Italy	Clay	(Italy) Verdiana Verardi	6–1, 1–6, 6–3
Loss	4.	19 October 2007	Settimo San Pietro, Italy	Clay	(Italy) Anna Floris	6–7^{(2–7)}, 3–6

=== Doubles: 17 (7–10) ===
Result	No.	Date	Tournament	Surface	Partner	Opponents	Score
Loss	1.	22 August 1999	Alghero, Italy	Carpet	(Italy) Sabina Da Ponte	(Italy) Roberta Vinci (Italy) Flavia Pennetta	2–6, 1–6
Win	1.	7 November 1999	Saint-Raphaël, France	Hard	(Slovenia) Maja Matevžič	(France) Victoria Courmes-Benedetti (France) Laëtitia Sanchez	6–3, 6–1
Loss	2.	6 August 2000	Alghero, Italy	Clay	(Italy) Alice Canepa	(Japan) Ayami Takase (Hong Kong) Tong Ka-po	6–3, 3–6, 1–6
Loss	3.	19 November 2000	Naples, United States	Clay	(Estonia) Maret Ani	(Japan) Nana Miyagi (Ukraine) Elena Tatarkova	3–5, 4–2, 4–2, 3–5, 1–4
Loss	4.	2 February 2003	Rockford, United States	Hard	(Czech Republic) Michaela Paštiková	(Netherlands) Debby Haak (Netherlands) Seda Noorlander	5–7, 4–6
Loss	5.	11 October 2005	Victoria, Mexico	Hard	(Argentina) Soledad Esperón	(Argentina) María José Argeri (Brazil) Letícia Sobral	3–6, 4–6
Loss	6.	13 November 2005	Mexico City	Clay	(Italy) Francesca Lubiani	(Brazil) Jenifer Widjaja (Brazil) Carla Tiene	6–7^{(5–7)}, 3–6
Win	2.	22 November 2005	San Luis Potosí, Mexico	Hard	(Italy) Francesca Lubiani	(Brazil) Jenifer Widjaja (Poland) Olga Brózda	6–3, 4–6, 7–5
Loss	7.	18 December 2005	Bergamo, Italy	Carpet (i)	(Italy) Francesca Lubiani	(Russia) Marina Shamayko (Russia) Ekaterina Bychkova	1–6, 3–6
Win	3.	1 May 2006	Catania, Italy	Clay	(Italy) Francesca Lubiani	(France) Diana Brunel (France) Virginie Pichet	w/o
Loss	8.	30 May 2006	Galatina, Italy	Clay	(Hungary) Kira Nagy	(Montenegro) Danica Krstajić (Czech Republic) Renata Voráčová	4–6, 0–6
Win	4.	29 July 2006	Monteroni d'Arbia, Italy	Clay	(France) Aurélie Védy	(Croatia) Matea Mezak (Croatia) Nika Ožegović	5–7, 6–4, 6–0
Win	5.	28 July 2007	Monteroni d'Arbia, Italy	Clay	(Russia) Alisa Kleybanova	(Italy) Elena Pioppo (Italy) Verdiana Verardi	7–5, 6–2
Win	6.	25 August 2007	Trecastagni, Italy	Hard	(Italy) Valentina Sulpizio	(Switzerland) Lisa Sabino (Italy) Nicole Clerico	4–6, 6–4, 7–5
Loss	9.	17 September 2007	Lecce, Italy	Clay	(Hungary) Kira Nagy	(France) Claire de Gubernatis (Germany) Tatjana Priachin	3–6, 2–6
Loss	10.	19 October 2007	Settimo San Pietro, Italy	Clay	(Italy) Stefania Chieppa	(Italy) Anna Floris (Italy) Valentina Sulpizio	1–6, 4–6
Win	7.	5 May 2008	Florence, Italy	Clay	(Hungary) Kira Nagy	(Kyrgyzstan) Ksenia Palkina (Italy) Martina Caciotti	6–2, 6–3
