= Virginie Pichet =

French tennis player

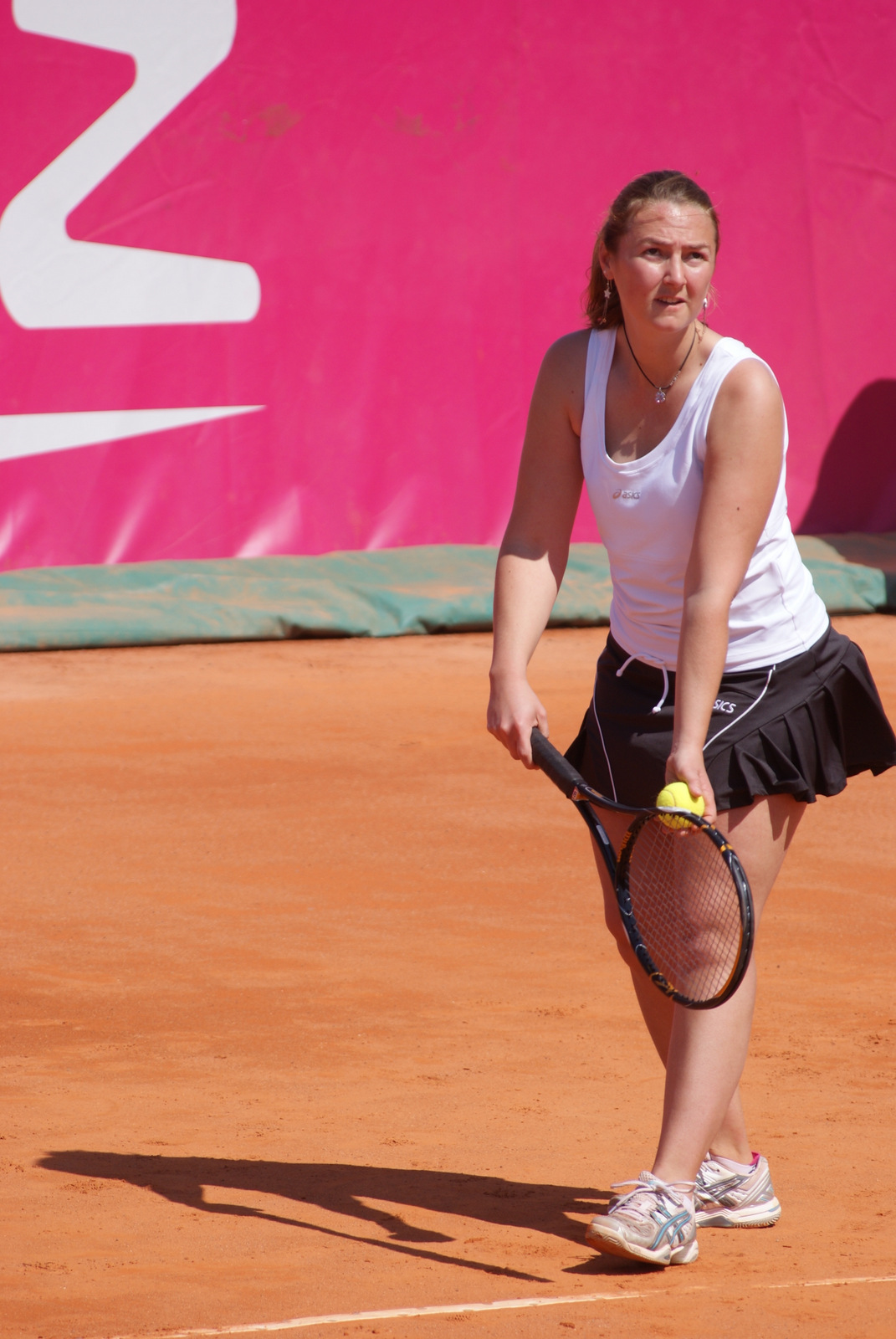
- Pichet at the 2009 Open de Cagnes-sur-Mer
- Country (sports): France
- Born: 28 January 1983 (age 42); France
- Turned pro: 2000
- Retired: 2014
- Plays: Right (two-handed backhand)
- Prize money: $233,925

Singles
- Career record: 248–183
- Career titles: 7 ITF
- Highest ranking: No. 120 (21 June 2004)

Grand Slam singles results
- Australian Open: Q2 (2004)
- French Open: 1R (2003, 2004, 2006)
- Wimbledon: Q2 (2006)
- US Open: Q3 (2003)

Doubles
- Career record: 69–62
- Career titles: 5 ITF
- Highest ranking: No. 239 (22 June 2009)

Grand Slam doubles results
- French Open: 1R (2003, 2004, 2005, 2006, 2007, 2008)

Virginie Pichet (French pronunciation: [viʁʒini piʃɛ]; born 28 January 1983) is a French former tennis player.

In her career, she won seven singles and five doubles titles on the ITF Women's Circuit. On 21 June 2004, she reached her best singles ranking of world No. 120. On 22 June 2009, she peaked at No. 239 in the doubles rankings.

Pichet, who started playing tennis at the age of seven, competed in the main draw of the French Open in singles 2003, 2004, 2006, and in doubles every year from 2003 to 2008, always losing her first round.

Virginie Pichet retired from professional tennis 2014.

== ITF Circuit finals ==
=== Singles: 22 (7–15) ===
| Legend $50,000 tournaments $25,000 tournaments $10,000 tournaments | Finals by surface Hard (5–7) Clay (1–6) Carpet (1–2) |

| Result | No. | Date | Tournament | Surface | Opponent | Score |
|---|---|---|---|---|---|---|
| Loss | 1. | 7 August 2000 | Périgueux, France | Clay | (France) Céline Beigbeder | 1–6, 1–6 |
| Loss | 2. | 19 November 2001 | Deauville, France | Clay (i) | (France) Sophie Erre | 4–6, 3–6 |
| Loss | 3. | 21 January 2002 | Grenoble, France | Hard (i) | (Austria) Sybille Bammer | 4–6, 4–6 |
| Loss | 4. | 14 July 2002 | Getxo, Spain | Clay | (Spain) María José Sánchez Alayeto | 4–6, 3–6 |
| Loss | 5. | 22 July 2002 | Pamplona, Spain | Hard (i) | (United Kingdom) Elena Baltacha | 2–6, 1–6 |
| Loss | 6. | 5 August 2002 | Rebecq, Belgium | Clay | (Belgium) Gaelle Taton | 6–4, 2–6, 3–6 |
| Loss | 7. | 19 August 2002 | Westende, Belgium | Hard | (Belgium) Leslie Butkiewicz | 4–6, 3–6 |
| Loss | 8. | 10 November 2002 | Le Havre, France | Clay (i) | (Belgium) Gaelle Taton | 5–7, 1–6 |
| Loss | 9. | 17 November 2002 | Deauville, France | Clay (i) | (Ukraine) Julia Vakulenko | 2–6, 1–6 |
| Win | 1. | 20 July 2003 | Les Contamines-Montjoie, France | Hard | (Italy) Nathalie Viérin | 4–6, 6–4, 6–3 |
| Loss | 10. | 30 November 2003 | Prague, Czech Republic | Carpet (i) | (Sweden) Sofia Arvidsson | 1–6, 2–6 |
| Loss | 11. | 17 February 2004 | Redbridge, UK | Hard (i) | (Russia) Anna Chakvetadze | 2–6, 2–6 |
| Win | 2. | 28 March 2004 | Athens, Greece | Hard | (Czech Republic) Kateřina Böhmová | 6–1, 6–2 |
| Win | 3. | 20 June 2005 | Périgueux, France | Clay | (Belarus) Ekaterina Dzehalevich | 6–3, 7–6 ^{(10–8)} |
| Win | 4. | 22 January 2006 | Tipton, UK | Hard (i) | (France) Irena Pavlovic | 6–4, 6–1 |
| Win | 5. | 29 January 2006 | Grenoble, France | Hard (i) | (France) Gaëlle Desperrier | 6–3, 6–1 |
| Loss | 12. | 19 February 2006 | Stockholm, Sweden | Hard (i) | (Russia) Elise Tamaëla | 3–6, 6–3, 2–6 |
| Win | 6. | 4 February 2007 | Belfort, France | Carpet (i) | (Switzerland) Stefanie Vögele | 2–6, 6–0, 6–2 |
| Loss | 13. | 13 February 2007 | Stockholm, Sweden | Hard (i) | (Croatia) Nika Ožegović | 2–6, 2–6 |
| Loss | 14. | 7 October 2007 | Nantes, France | Hard (i) | (Poland) Anna Korzeniak | 4–6, 0–6 |
| Win | 7. | 27 October 2007 | Saint-Denis, France | Hard | (Serbia) Teodora Mirčić | 6–1, 6–3 |
| Loss | 15. | 28 January 2008 | Belfort, France | Carpet (i) | (France) Julie Coin | 0–6, 3–6 |

=== Doubles: 12 (5–7) ===
| Legend $50,000 tournaments $25,000 tournaments $10,000 tournaments | Finals by surface Hard (2–3) Clay (3–3) Carpet (0–1) |

| Result | No. | Date | Tournament | Surface | Partner | Opponents | Score |
|---|---|---|---|---|---|---|---|
| Win | 1. | 15 November 1999 | Deauville, France | Clay (i) | (France) Chloé Carlotti | (Netherlands) Maaike Koutstaal (Czech Republic) Magdalena Zděnovcová | 7–5, 6–4 |
| Loss | 1. | 7 August 2000 | Périgueux, France | Clay | (France) Chloé Carlotti | (France) Diana Brunel (France) Edith Nunes | 3–6, 4–6 |
| Win | 2. | 21 March 2004 | Amiens, France | Clay (i) | (Belgium) Caroline Maes | (France) Florence Haring (Madagascar) Natacha Randriantefy | 3–6, 6–2, 7–5 |
| Win | 3. | 1 November 2004 | Sint-Katelijne-Waver, Belgium | Hard (i) | (Tunisia) Selima Sfar | (Slovakia) Eva Fislová (Slovakia) Stanislava Hrozenská | 6–1, 7–6^{(7–2)} |
| Loss | 2. | 4 July 2005 | Le Touquet, France | Clay | (France) Karla Mraz | (France) Julie Coin (France) Alice Hall | 5–7, 6–7^{(5–7)} |
| Loss | 3. | 29 January 2006 | Grenoble, France | Hard (i) | (France) Florence Haring | (Romania) Simona Matei (Turkey) Pemra Özgen | 3–6, 5–7 |
| Loss | 4. | 1 May 2006 | Catania, Italy | Clay | (France) Diana Brunel | (Italy) Francesca Lubiani (Italy) Valentina Sassi | w/o |
| Loss | 5. | 28 October 2007 | Saint-Denis, France | Hard | (France) Florence Haring | (Mauritius) Marinne Giraud (Serbia) Teodora Mirčić | 2–6, 5–7 |
| Win | 4. | 26 January 2009 | Grenoble, France | Hard (i) | (France) Youlia Fedossova | (Russia) Maria Kondratieva (France) Sophie Lefèvre | 6–3, 6–3 |
| Loss | 6. | 2 February 2009 | Belfort, France | Hard (i) | (France) Youlia Fedossova | (Latvia) Irina Kuzmina (Ukraine) Oxana Lyubtsova | 3–6, 6–3, [5–10] |
| Loss | 7. | 23 March 2009 | Jersey, United Kingdom | Carpet (i) | (France) Youlia Fedossova | (Italy) Maria Elena Camerin (France) Stéphanie Foretz | 4–6, 2–6 |
| Win | 5. | 13 April 2009 | Tessenderlo, Belgium | Clay (i) | (France) Youlia Fedossova | (Switzerland) Stefania Boffa (Croatia) Darija Jurak | 7–5, 6–3 |
