= Kathrin Wörle-Scheller =

German tennis player

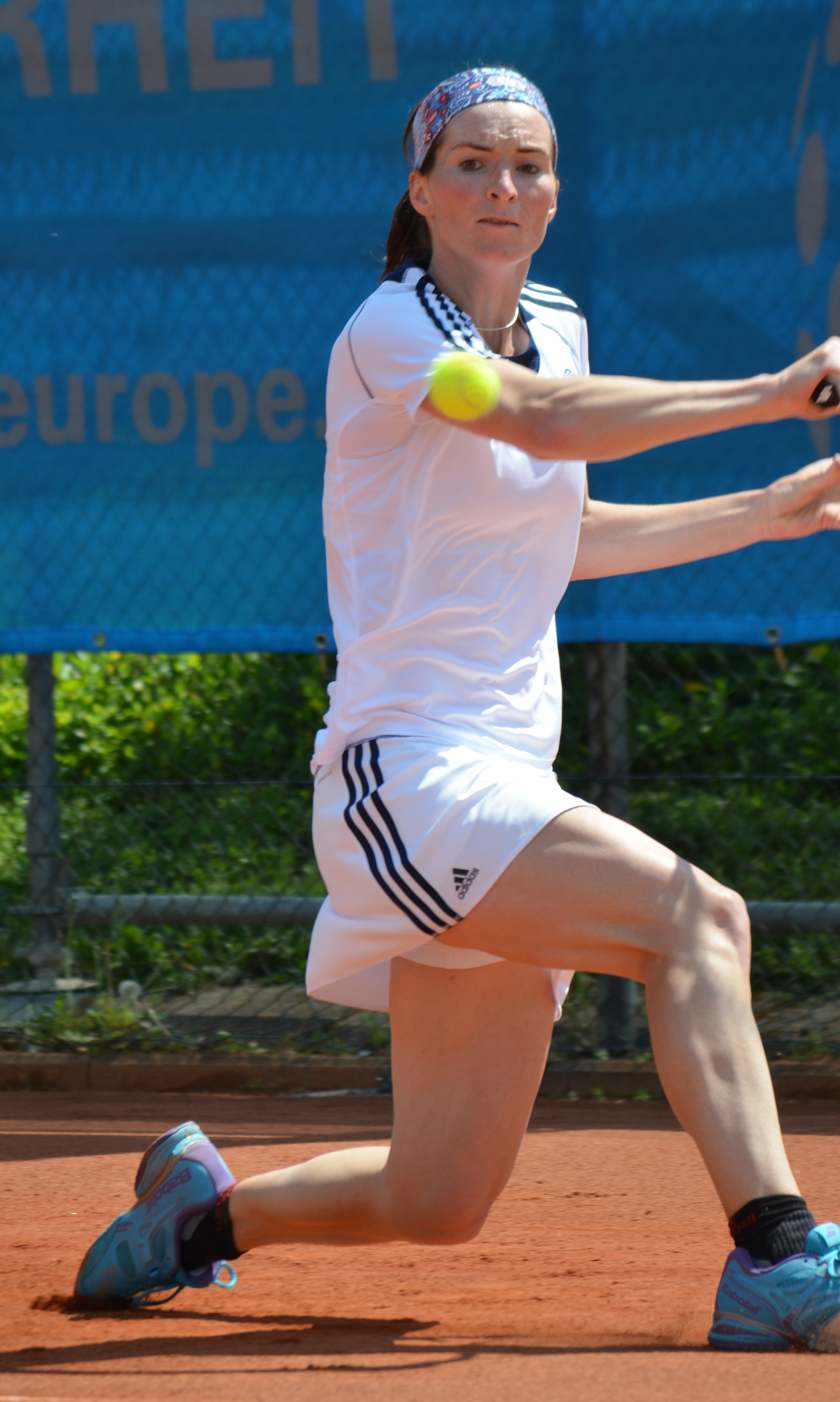
- ITF name: Kathrin Woerle-Scheller
- Country (sports): Germany
- Born: 18 February 1984 (age 42) Lindau, West Germany
- Height: 1.75 m (5 ft 9 in)
- Turned pro: July 2003
- Plays: Right-handed (two-handed backhand)
- Prize money: $530,496

Singles
- Career record: 368–363
- Career titles: 3 ITF
- Highest ranking: No. 119 (22 February 2010)

Grand Slam singles results
- Australian Open: 1R (2006, 2009, 2010, 2011)
- French Open: Q3 (2006, 2009, 2010)
- Wimbledon: Q3 (2008)
- US Open: Q3 (2005)

Doubles
- Career record: 188–208
- Career titles: 7 ITF
- Highest ranking: No. 99 (16 May 2011)

Grand Slam doubles results
- Wimbledon: 1R (2010)

Kathrin Wörle-Scheller (née Wörle, born 18 February 1984) is a former German tennis player.

Wörle-Scheller won three singles titles and seven doubles titles on the ITF Women's Circuit. On 22 February 2010, she reached her best singles ranking of world No. 119. On 16 May 2011, she peaked at No. 99 in the WTA doubles rankings.

She played her last match on the ITF Circuit in August 2015.

Playing for Germany, Wörle-Scheller has a win–loss record of 0–2 in Fed Cup competitions.

In September 2012, she married, and in April 2013, she changed her surname to Wörle-Scheller.

== WTA Tour finals ==
=== Doubles: 1 (runner-up) ===
Legend Grand Slam (0–0) Tier I (0–0) Tier II (0–0) Tier III, IV & V (0–1)	Finals by surface Hard (0–1) Clay (0–0) Grass (0–0) Carpet (0–0)

Result	Date	Tournament	Surface	Partner	Opponents	Score
Loss	Sep 2008	Tashkent Open, Uzbekistan	Hard	(Russia) Nina Bratchikova	(Romania) Raluca Olaru (Ukraine) Olga Savchuk	7–5, 5–7, [7–10]

== ITF finals ==
=== Singles: 8 (3–5) ===
Legend $100,000 tournaments $75,000 tournaments $50,000 tournaments $25,000 tournaments $10,000 tournaments	Finals by surface Hard (0–0) Clay (3–5)

Result	No.	Date	Tournament	Surface	Opponent	Score
Loss	1.	3 May 2004	ITF Catania, Italy	Clay	(France) Stéphanie Foretz	4–6, 7–6^{(7–2)}, 2–6
Loss	2.	14 May 2007	ITF Antalya, Turkey	Clay	(Germany) Julia Görges	6–7^{(5–7)}, 4–6
Loss	3.	30 July 2007	ITF Bad Saulgau, Germany	Clay	(Serbia) Ana Jovanović	5–7, 6–4, 5–7
Win	1.	26 November 2007	ITF Sintra, Portugal	Clay (i)	(Hungary) Kira Nagy	6–3, 6–2
Win	2.	7 April 2008	Open de Biarritz, France	Clay	(Tunisia) Selima Sfar	6–1, 6–3
Win	3.	16 March 2009	ITF Cairo, Egypt	Clay	(Italy) Nathalie Viérin	6–2, 6–4
Loss	4.	13 July 2009	Contrexéville Open, France	Clay	(Russia) Ekaterina Bychkova	4–6, 4–6
Loss	5.	9 July 2012	ITF Aschaffenburg, Germany	Clay	(Germany) Anna-Lena Friedsam	4–6, 6–2, 4–6

=== Doubles: 17 (7–10) ===
Legend $100,000 tournaments $75,000 tournaments $50,000 tournaments $25,000 tournaments $10,000 tournaments	Finals by surface Hard (2–1) Clay (5–9)

Result	No.	Date	Tournament	Surface	Partner	Opponents	Score
Win	1.	28 July 2003	ITF Bad Saulgau, Germany	Clay	(Germany) Christina Fitz	(Germany) Antonia Matic (Germany) Lydia Steinbach	6–2, 6–1
Loss	1.	31 May 2004	ITF Galatina, Italy	Clay	(Belarus) Nadejda Ostrovskaya	(Italy) Giulia Casoni (Czech Republic) Vladimíra Uhlířová	4–6, 0–6
Win	2.	20 September 2004	ITF Jersey, United Kingdom	Hard (i)	(Finland) Emma Laine	(Netherlands) Anousjka van Exel (Turkey) İpek Şenoğlu	1–6, 6–1, 6–1
Loss	2.	25 October 2004	ITF Istanbul, Turkey	Clay	(Turkey) İpek Şenoğlu	(Ukraine) Olena Antypina (Czech Republic) Hana Šromová	7–6^{(7–5)}, 3–6, 5–7
Loss	3.	9 May 2005	ITF Antalya, Turkey	Clay	(Czech Republic) Renata Kučerková	(Romania) Gabriela Niculescu (Romania) Monica Niculescu	7–6^{(7–0)}, 0–6, 0–6
Loss	4.	27 June 2005	ITF Stuttgart, Germany	Clay	(Germany) Kristina Barrois	(Ukraine) Yuliya Beygelzimer (Germany) Vanessa Henke	6–7^{(5–7)}, 1–6
Win	3.	30 January 2006	ITF Belfort, France	Hard (i)	(Germany) Kristina Barrois	(Russia) Ekaterina Ivanova (Latvia) Irina Kuzmina	6–1, 6–2
Win	4.	6 August 2007	Ladies Open Hechingen, Germany	Clay	(Slovakia) Michaela Paštiková	(Croatia) Darija Jurak (Bosnia and Herzegovina) Sandra Martinović	6–4, 6–4
Loss	5.	15 October 2007	GB Pro-Series Glasgow, UK	Hard (i)	(Czech Republic) Veronika Chvojková	(Sweden) Sofia Arvidsson (Sweden) Johanna Larsson	3–6, 2–6
Loss	6.	24 March 2008	ITF Latina, Italy	Clay	(Bosnia and Herzegovina) Sandra Martinović	(Italy) Elisa Balsamo (Italy) Valentina Sulpizio	6–0, 6–7^{(6–8)}, [7–10]
Loss	7.	28 July 2008	ITF Rimini, Italy	Clay	(Switzerland) Stefanie Vögele	(Italy) Mara Santangelo (Italy) Roberta Vinci	1–6, 4–6
Loss	8.	29 June 2009	ITF Stuttgart, Germany	Clay	(Netherlands) Leonie Mekel	(Hungary) Katalin Marosi (Germany) Laura Siegemund	6–7^{(2–7)}, 7–6^{(8–6)}, [4–10]
Win	5.	13 July 2009	Contrexéville Open, France	Clay	(Austria) Yvonne Meusburger	(France) Stéphanie Cohen-Aloro (France) Pauline Parmentier	6–2, 6–2
Loss	9.	20 July 2009	ITF Pétange, Luxembourg	Clay	(Croatia) Darija Jurak	(France) Stéphanie Cohen-Aloro (Tunisia) Selima Sfar	2–6, 6–3, [7–10]
Loss	10.	7 February 2011	ITF Cali, Colombia	Clay	(Russia) Ekaterina Ivanova	(Romania) Irina-Camelia Begu (Romania) Elena Bogdan	6–2, 6–7^{(6–8)}, [9–11]
Win	6.	25 April 2011	Chiasso Open, Switzerland	Clay	(Austria) Yvonne Meusburger	(France) Claire Feuerstein (France) Anaïs Laurendon	6–3, 6–3
Win	7.	28 May 2012	Maribor Open, Slovenia	Clay	(Romania) Elena Bogdan	(Denmark) Karen Barbat (Germany) Anna-Lena Friedsam	6–2, 2–6, [10–5]
