= Florence Haring =

French tennis player

- Country (sports): France
- Residence: Collonges, France
- Born: 2 October 1985 (age 39); Geneva, Switzerland
- Turned pro: 2003
- Plays: Right-handed (two-handed backhand)
- Prize money: $115,918

Singles
- Career record: 182–196
- Career titles: 0 WTA, 0 ITF
- Highest ranking: No. 213 (26 June 2008)

Grand Slam singles results
- French Open: Q2 (2006, 2007)
- US Open: Q1 (2006)

Doubles
- Career record: 63–117
- Career titles: 0 WTA, 1 ITF
- Highest ranking: No. 255 (19 October 2009)

Grand Slam doubles results
- French Open: 1R (2005, 2006, 2007)
- Last updated on: 28 March 2011.

Florence Haring (born 2 October 1985) is a French professional tennis player.

Haring has won one doubles on the ITF tour in her career. On 26 June 2006 she reached her best singles ranking of world number 213. On 19 October 2009, she peaked at world number 255 in the doubles rankings.

== Career ==
Haring competed in the main draw of the French Open in doubles in 2005, 2006, and 2007. She and her partner lost each time in the first round.

== Career statistics ==
=== Singles finals: 6 (0–6) ===
$100,000 tournaments
$75,000 tournaments
$50,000 tournaments
$25,000 tournaments
$10,000 tournaments

Outcome	No.	Date	Tournament	Surface	Opponent in the final	Score in the final
Runner-up	1.	7 November 2004	Sutama, Japan	Clay	(Japan) Natsumi Hamamura	6–3, 3–6, 5–7
Runner-up	2.	30 October 2005	Mexico City, Mexico	Hard	(France) Mathilde Johansson	W/O
Runner-up	3.	28 January 2007	Grenoble, France	Hard (i)	(Poland) Anna Korzeniak	6–7^{(3–7)}, 4–6
Runner-up	4.	14 April 2008	Bol, Croatia	Clay	(Czech Republic) Karolína Plíšková	4–6, 5–7
Runner-up	5.	29 June 2008	Périgueux, France	Clay	(Germany) Anna-Lena Grönefeld	3–6, 3–6
Runner-up	6.	18 August 2008	Westende, Belgium	Hard	(Germany) Carmen Klaschka	6–4, 4–6, 4–6

=== Doubles finals: 6 (1–5) ===
Outcome	No.	Date	Tournament	Surface	Partner	Opponents in the final	Score
Runner-up	1.	22 February 2004	Portimão, Portugal	Hard	(France) Alexandra Mayrat	(Argentina) Soledad Esperón (Argentina) Flavia Mignola	1–6, 1–6
Runner-up	2.	21 March 2004	Amiens, France	Clay (i)	(Madagascar) Natacha Randriantefy	(Belgium) Caroline Maes (France) Virginie Pichet	6–3, 2–6, 5–7
Runner-up	3.	29 January 2006	Grenoble, France	Hard (i)	(France) Virginie Pichet	(Romania) Simona Matei (Turkey) Pemra Özgen	3–6, 5–7
Runner-up	4.	28 October 2007	Saint-Denis, Réunion, France	Hard	(France) Virginie Pichet	(Mauritius) Marinne Giraud (Serbia) Teodora Mirčić	2–6, 5–7
Runner-up	5.	5 October 2009	Limoges, France	Clay	(France) Violette Huck	(Russia) Elena Chalova (Georgia (country)) Oksana Kalashnikova	6–4, 3–6, [4–10]
Winner	6.	21 November 2010	Equeurdreville, France	Hard (i)	(Madagascar) Nantenaina Ramalalaharivololona	(Netherlands) Kim Kilsdonk (Netherlands) Nicolette van Uitert	1–6, 6–3, [10–6]
