= Marcella Koek =

Dutch tennis and padel player

- Country (sports): Netherlands
- Born: 27 May 1988 (age 38)
- Retired: 2012
- Plays: Right-handed (two-handed backhand)
- Prize money: US$ 48,302

Singles
- Career titles: 5 ITF

Doubles
- Career titles: 23 ITF

Marcella Koek (born 27 May 1988) is a Dutch professional padel player and former professional tennis player.

== Tennis career ==
In her tennis career, she won five singles and 23 doubles titles on the ITF Women's Circuit. Koek retired from professional tour in 2012.

== Padel tennis career ==
Since 2015, she is a professional padel player and has her official padel instructor certificate, working as an instructor at Burgersdijk Tennis. Koek will participate in the Padel World Cup in Paraguay at the end of 2018. In 2018, Koek partnering Milou Ettekoven, claimed championship at the WebXperience NPB100 TPC Daalmeer tournament. Ettekoven/Koek confirmed their status as No. 1 ranked female padel team in Holland for the Nederlandse Padelbond ranking.

In 2019, Koek and Ettekoven claimed championship at the Playtomic/Tibeflex Open FIP 250 in Gent, Belgium for the international padel circuit.
