= 2011 ITF Women's Circuit (April–June) =

Tennis tournaments

The 2011 ITF Women's Circuit is the 2011 edition of the second tier tour for women's professional tennis. It is organised by the International Tennis Federation and is a tier below the WTA Tour. During the months of April 2011 and June 2011 over 150 tournaments were played with the majority being played in the month of May.

== Key ==
$100,000 tournaments
$75,000 tournaments
$50,000 tournaments
$25,000 tournaments
$10,000 tournaments

== April ==
Week of	Tournament	Winner	Runners-up	Semifinalists	Quarterfinalists
April 4	Bundaberg, Australia; Clay $25,000; Singles draw – Doubles draw	(Australia) Casey Dellacqua; 6–2, 6–3	(Australia) Olivia Rogowska	(Chinese Taipei) Hsu Wen-hsin (Turkey) Pemra Özgen	(Ukraine) Lesia Tsurenko (New Zealand) Sacha Jones (Australia) Bojana Bobusic (United States) Gail Brodsky
April 4	Bundaberg, Australia; Clay $25,000; Singles draw – Doubles draw	(Australia) Casey Dellacqua (Australia) Olivia Rogowska; 7–5, 6–4	(Australia) Daniella Dominikovic (Poland) Sandra Zaniewska	(Chinese Taipei) Hsu Wen-hsin (Turkey) Pemra Özgen	(Ukraine) Lesia Tsurenko (New Zealand) Sacha Jones (Australia) Bojana Bobusic (United States) Gail Brodsky
April 4	Jackson, Mississippi, United States; Clay $25,000; Singles draw – Doubles draw	(New Zealand) Marina Erakovic; 6–1, 6–2	(Croatia) Ajla Tomljanović	(United States) Julia Boserup (Brazil) Roxane Vaisemberg	(Chinese Taipei) Chan Yung-jan (Argentina) Florencia Molinero (Canada) Heidi El Tabakh (Ukraine) Alyona Sotnikova
April 4	Jackson, Mississippi, United States; Clay $25,000; Singles draw – Doubles draw	(Canada) Sharon Fichman (Canada) Marie-Ève Pelletier; 7–6^{(7–1)}, 7–6^{(7–3)}	(Czech Republic) Eva Hrdinová (France) Nathalie Piquion	(United States) Julia Boserup (Brazil) Roxane Vaisemberg	(Chinese Taipei) Chan Yung-jan (Argentina) Florencia Molinero (Canada) Heidi El Tabakh (Ukraine) Alyona Sotnikova
April 4	Pomezia, Italy; Clay $10,000; Singles draw – Doubles draw	(Georgia (country)) Margalita Chakhnashvili; 1–6, 6–2, 6–2	(Italy) Annalisa Bona	(Italy) Anastasia Grymalska (Italy) Anna Remondina	(Italy) Nastassya Burnett (Poland) Anna Korzeniak (Italy) Alice Moroni (Spain) Lucía Cervera Vázquez
April 4	Pomezia, Italy; Clay $10,000; Singles draw – Doubles draw	(Italy) Benedetta Davato (Switzerland) Lisa Sabino; 6–7^{(5–7)}, 6–4, [10–8]	(Italy) Claudia Giovine (Italy) Valentina Sulpizio	(Italy) Anastasia Grymalska (Italy) Anna Remondina	(Italy) Nastassya Burnett (Poland) Anna Korzeniak (Italy) Alice Moroni (Spain) Lucía Cervera Vázquez
April 4	Šibenik, Croatia; Clay $10,000; Singles draw – Doubles draw	(Canada) Eugenie Bouchard; 6–2, 6–0	(France) Jessica Ginier	(Czech Republic) Simona Dobrá (Switzerland) Amra Sadiković	(Slovakia) Michaela Pochabová (Czech Republic) Jana Jandová (Italy) Paola Cigui (Croatia) Maria Abramović
April 4	Šibenik, Croatia; Clay $10,000; Singles draw – Doubles draw	(Switzerland) Mateja Kraljevic (Switzerland) Amra Sadiković; 7–5, 6–3	(Czech Republic) Simona Dobrá (Czech Republic) Tereza Hladíková	(Czech Republic) Simona Dobrá (Switzerland) Amra Sadiković	(Slovakia) Michaela Pochabová (Czech Republic) Jana Jandová (Italy) Paola Cigui (Croatia) Maria Abramović
April 4	Antalya, Turkey; Hard $10,000; Singles draw – Doubles draw	(Netherlands) Quirine Lemoine; 6–4, 6–2	(Bulgaria) Isabella Shinikova	(United Kingdom) Jade Windley (Georgia (country)) Ekaterine Gorgodze	(Russia) Ksenia Lykina (Slovakia) Jana Čepelová (United Kingdom) Samantha Murray (Hungary) Vaszilisza Bulgakova
April 4	Antalya, Turkey; Hard $10,000; Singles draw – Doubles draw	(Russia) Irina Glimakova (Russia) Polina Monova; 6–4, 6–7^{(4–7)}, [10–8]	(Indonesia) Jessy Rompies (Indonesia) Grace Sari Ysidora	(United Kingdom) Jade Windley (Georgia (country)) Ekaterine Gorgodze	(Russia) Ksenia Lykina (Slovakia) Jana Čepelová (United Kingdom) Samantha Murray (Hungary) Vaszilisza Bulgakova
April 4	Almaty, Kazakhstan; Hard $10,000; Singles draw – Doubles draw	(Russia) Nadezda Gorbachkova; 2–6, 6–4, 6–3	(Uzbekistan) Vlada Ekshibarova	(Slovakia) Zuzana Luknárová (Russia) Polina Vinogradova	(Russia) Angelina Gabueva (Russia) Maya Gaverova (Uzbekistan) Albina Khabibulina (Belarus) Sviatlana Pirazhenka
April 4	Almaty, Kazakhstan; Hard $10,000; Singles draw – Doubles draw	(Uzbekistan) Albina Khabibulina (Slovakia) Zuzana Luknárová; 7–6^{(7–2)}, 4–6, [10–5]	(Belarus) Lidziya Marozava (Belarus) Sviatlana Pirazhenka	(Slovakia) Zuzana Luknárová (Russia) Polina Vinogradova	(Russia) Angelina Gabueva (Russia) Maya Gaverova (Uzbekistan) Albina Khabibulina (Belarus) Sviatlana Pirazhenka
April 4	Lucknow, India; Grass $10,000; Singles draw – Doubles draw	(India) Sharmada Balu; 6–3, 2–6, 6–2	(Austria) Yvonne Neuwirth	(France) Céline Cattaneo (Italy) Stephanie Scimone	(Slovenia) Anja Prislan (India) Kyra Shroff (India) Sheethal Goutham (Japan) Kaori Aoyama
April 4	Lucknow, India; Grass $10,000; Singles draw – Doubles draw	(Slovenia) Anja Prislan (India) Kyra Shroff; 6–3, 6–3	(India) Aishwarya Agrawal (India) Ankita Raina	(France) Céline Cattaneo (Italy) Stephanie Scimone	(Slovenia) Anja Prislan (India) Kyra Shroff (India) Sheethal Goutham (Japan) Kaori Aoyama
April 4	Caracas, Venezuela; Hard $10,000; Singles draw – Doubles draw	(Venezuela) Adriana Pérez; 6–1, 6–3	(Belarus) Viktoryia Kisialeva	(Czech Republic) Zuzana Linhová (United States) Elizabeth Ferris	(Germany) Jessica Sabeshinskaja (Venezuela) Carmen Blanco (Bulgaria) Aleksandrina Naydenova (Colombia) Karen Castiblanco
April 4	Caracas, Venezuela; Hard $10,000; Singles draw – Doubles draw	(Colombia) Karen Castiblanco (Venezuela) Adriana Pérez; 7–5, 6–2	(Croatia) Indire Akiki (Czech Republic) Zuzana Linhová	(Czech Republic) Zuzana Linhová (United States) Elizabeth Ferris	(Germany) Jessica Sabeshinskaja (Venezuela) Carmen Blanco (Bulgaria) Aleksandrina Naydenova (Colombia) Karen Castiblanco
April 4	Córdoba, Argentina; Clay $10,000; Singles draw – Doubles draw	(Argentina) Tatiana Búa; 4–6, 6–3, 6–2	(Austria) Tina Schiechtl	(Argentina) Luciana Sarmenti (Argentina) Aranza Salut	(Chile) Daniela Seguel (Argentina) Carolina Zeballos (Argentina) Salome Llaguno (Chile) Camila Silva
April 4	Córdoba, Argentina; Clay $10,000; Singles draw – Doubles draw	(Argentina) Andrea Benítez (Argentina) Salome Llaguno; 6–0, 5–7, [10–3]	(Chile) Belen Luduena (Chile) Daniela Seguel	(Argentina) Luciana Sarmenti (Argentina) Aranza Salut	(Chile) Daniela Seguel (Argentina) Carolina Zeballos (Argentina) Salome Llaguno (Chile) Camila Silva
April 11	2011 Soweto Open; Johannesburg, South Africa; Hard $100,000+H; Singles – Doubles	(Russia) Valeria Savinykh; 6–1, 6–3	(Czech Republic) Petra Cetkovská	(United Kingdom) Anne Keothavong (Germany) Kathrin Wörle	(Greece) Irini Georgatou (Italy) Corinna Dentoni (Russia) Nina Bratchikova (Netherlands) Kiki Bertens
April 11	2011 Soweto Open; Johannesburg, South Africa; Hard $100,000+H; Singles – Doubles	All doubles semifinal matches were cancelled by the supervisor, due to heavy rain and flooding.		(United Kingdom) Anne Keothavong (Germany) Kathrin Wörle	(Greece) Irini Georgatou (Italy) Corinna Dentoni (Russia) Nina Bratchikova (Netherlands) Kiki Bertens
April 11	Casablanca, Morocco; Clay $25,000; Singles draw – Doubles draw	(Kazakhstan) Galina Voskoboeva; 6–7^{(4–7)}, 6–2, 6–3	(Bosnia and Herzegovina) Mervana Jugić-Salkić	(Portugal) Maria João Koehler (Italy) Anna Floris	(Colombia) Mariana Duque (Spain) Estrella Cabeza Candela (Romania) Alexandra Cadanțu (France) Claire Feuerstein
April 11	Casablanca, Morocco; Clay $25,000; Singles draw – Doubles draw	(Austria) Sandra Klemenschits (France) Kristina Mladenovic; 6–3, 3–6, [10–8]	(Poland) Magda Linette (Poland) Katarzyna Piter	(Portugal) Maria João Koehler (Italy) Anna Floris	(Colombia) Mariana Duque (Spain) Estrella Cabeza Candela (Romania) Alexandra Cadanțu (France) Claire Feuerstein
April 11	Incheon, Korean Republic; Hard $25,000; Singles draw – Doubles draw	(South Korea) Kim So-jung; 2–6, 6–3, 6–1	(South Korea) Lee Jin-a	(Japan) Yurika Sema (Ukraine) Tetyana Arefyeva	(Chinese Taipei) Hsu Wen-hsin (China) Duan Yingying (Japan) Erika Takao (New Zealand) Sacha Jones
April 11	Incheon, Korean Republic; Hard $25,000; Singles draw – Doubles draw	(South Korea) Han Sung-hee (South Korea) Hong Hyun Hui; 6–3, 7–6^{(7–3)}	(Chinese Taipei) Kao Shao-yuan (Thailand) Varatchaya Wongteanchai	(Japan) Yurika Sema (Ukraine) Tetyana Arefyeva	(Chinese Taipei) Hsu Wen-hsin (China) Duan Yingying (Japan) Erika Takao (New Zealand) Sacha Jones
April 11	Osprey, Florida, United States; Clay $25,000; Singles draw – Doubles draw	(France) Claire de Gubernatis; 6–4, 6–4	(France) Caroline Garcia	(United States) Lauren Albanese (United States) Chichi Scholl	(Japan) Erika Sema (France) Iryna Brémond (Hungary) Melinda Czink (Portugal) Michelle Larcher de Brito
April 11	Osprey, Florida, United States; Clay $25,000; Singles draw – Doubles draw	(France) Stéphanie Foretz Gacon (United States) Alexa Glatch; 4–6, 7–5, [10–7]	(Argentina) María Irigoyen (Japan) Erika Sema	(United States) Lauren Albanese (United States) Chichi Scholl	(Japan) Erika Sema (France) Iryna Brémond (Hungary) Melinda Czink (Portugal) Michelle Larcher de Brito
April 11	Pomezia, Italy; Clay $10,000; Singles draw – Doubles draw	(Italy) Anna Remondina; 5–7, 6–2, 6–3	(Romania) Cristina Dinu	(Georgia (country)) Margalita Chakhnashvili (Italy) Anastasia Grymalska	(France) Victoria Larrière (Italy) Stefania Chieppa (Italy) Andreea Văideanu (Romania) Diana Enache
April 11	Pomezia, Italy; Clay $10,000; Singles draw – Doubles draw	(Romania) Diana Enache (Italy) Karin Knapp; 7–6^{(7–3)}, 6–2	(Switzerland) Conny Perrin (Russia) Marina Shamayko	(Georgia (country)) Margalita Chakhnashvili (Italy) Anastasia Grymalska	(France) Victoria Larrière (Italy) Stefania Chieppa (Italy) Andreea Văideanu (Romania) Diana Enache
April 11	Bol, Croatia; Clay $10,000; Singles draw – Doubles draw	(Italy) Evelyn Mayr; 7–6^{(7–3)}, 6–2	(Germany) Anna-Lena Friedsam	(France) Jessica Ginier (France) Marion Gaud	(Croatia) Matea Ćurić (Slovenia) Anja Prislan (France) Gracia Radovanovic (Czech Republic) Jana Jandová
April 11	Bol, Croatia; Clay $10,000; Singles draw – Doubles draw	(Czech Republic) Martina Borecká (Czech Republic) Martina Kubičíková; 6–2, 6–4	(Italy) Evelyn Mayr (Italy) Julia Mayr	(France) Jessica Ginier (France) Marion Gaud	(Croatia) Matea Ćurić (Slovenia) Anja Prislan (France) Gracia Radovanovic (Czech Republic) Jana Jandová
April 11	Antalya, Turkey; Hard $10,000; Singles draw – Doubles draw	(Russia) Daria Gavrilova; 6–4, 4–6, 6–2	(Russia) Ksenia Lykina	(Russia) Marta Sirotkina (France) Charlotte Rodier	(Uzbekistan) Nigina Abduraimova (Slovakia) Nikola Vajdová (Netherlands) Quirine Lemoine (Germany) Korina Perkovic
April 11	Antalya, Turkey; Hard $10,000; Singles draw – Doubles draw	(United Kingdom) Lucy Brown (United Kingdom) Francesca Stephenson; 6–4, 6–4	(Indonesia) Jessy Rompies (Indonesia) Grace Sari Ysidora	(Russia) Marta Sirotkina (France) Charlotte Rodier	(Uzbekistan) Nigina Abduraimova (Slovakia) Nikola Vajdová (Netherlands) Quirine Lemoine (Germany) Korina Perkovic
April 11	Caracas, Venezuela; Hard $10,000; Singles draw – Doubles draw	(Venezuela) Adriana Pérez; 2–6, 6–2, 6–2	(United States) Amanda McDowell	(Chile) Andrea Koch Benvenuto (United States) Lena Litvak	(United States) Deborah Suarez (Colombia) Karen Castiblanco (Czech Republic) Zuzana Linhová (United States) Elizabeth Ferris
April 11	Caracas, Venezuela; Hard $10,000; Singles draw – Doubles draw	(Colombia) Karen Castiblanco (Venezuela) Adriana Pérez; 7–6^{(12–10)}, 6–4	(United States) Lena Litvak (United States) Amanda McDowell	(Chile) Andrea Koch Benvenuto (United States) Lena Litvak	(United States) Deborah Suarez (Colombia) Karen Castiblanco (Czech Republic) Zuzana Linhová (United States) Elizabeth Ferris
April 11	Córdoba, Argentina; Clay $10,000; Singles draw – Doubles draw	(Argentina) Andrea Benítez; 6–3, 6–3	(Argentina) Catalina Pella	(Argentina) Tatiana Búa (Slovakia) Viktória Maľová	(Argentina) Aranza Salut (Argentina) Carla Lucero (Argentina) Carolina Zeballos (Argentina) Luciana Sarmenti
April 11	Córdoba, Argentina; Clay $10,000; Singles draw – Doubles draw	(Argentina) Andrea Benítez (Argentina) Tatiana Búa; 6–3, 6–4	(Argentina) Catalina Pella (Argentina) Luciana Sarmenti	(Argentina) Tatiana Búa (Slovakia) Viktória Maľová	(Argentina) Aranza Salut (Argentina) Carla Lucero (Argentina) Carolina Zeballos (Argentina) Luciana Sarmenti
April 18	Dothan Pro Tennis Classic; Dothan, Alabama, United States; Clay $50,000; Singles draw – Doubles draw	(Hungary) Melinda Czink; 6–2, 6–3	(France) Stéphanie Foretz Gacon	(Brazil) Roxane Vaisemberg (United States) Alison Riske	(Georgia (country)) Anna Tatishvili (Argentina) Florencia Molinero (United States) Alexandra Stevenson (Canada) Stéphanie Dubois
April 18	Dothan Pro Tennis Classic; Dothan, Alabama, United States; Clay $50,000; Singles draw – Doubles draw	(Russia) Valeria Solovieva (Slovakia) Lenka Wienerová; 6–3, 6–4	(Canada) Heidi El Tabakh (United States) Alison Riske	(Brazil) Roxane Vaisemberg (United States) Alison Riske	(Georgia (country)) Anna Tatishvili (Argentina) Florencia Molinero (United States) Alexandra Stevenson (Canada) Stéphanie Dubois
April 18	Civitavecchia, Italy; Clay $25,000; Singles draw – Doubles draw	(Spain) María Teresa Torró Flor; 6–3, 6–4	(Italy) Anna Remondina	(Georgia (country)) Margalita Chakhnashvili (Italy) Giulia Gatto-Monticone	(Kyrgyzstan) Ksenia Palkina (France) Laura Thorpe (Germany) Mona Barthel (Slovenia) Andreja Klepač
April 18	Civitavecchia, Italy; Clay $25,000; Singles draw – Doubles draw	(Netherlands) Daniëlle Harmsen (Hungary) Réka-Luca Jani; 6–2, 6–3	(Romania) Diana Enache (Romania) Liana Ungur	(Georgia (country)) Margalita Chakhnashvili (Italy) Giulia Gatto-Monticone	(Kyrgyzstan) Ksenia Palkina (France) Laura Thorpe (Germany) Mona Barthel (Slovenia) Andreja Klepač
April 18	Tessenderlo, Belgium; Clay $25,000; Singles draw – Doubles draw	(Germany) Anna-Lena Grönefeld; 6–3, 7–5	(Belgium) Alison Van Uytvanck	(Netherlands) Kiki Bertens (Switzerland) Conny Perrin	(Ukraine) Maryna Zanevska (Georgia (country)) Sofia Shapatava (Belgium) An-Sophie Mestach (Ukraine) Elina Svitolina
April 18	Tessenderlo, Belgium; Clay $25,000; Singles draw – Doubles draw	(Germany) Anna-Lena Grönefeld (Germany) Tatjana Malek; 7–5, 6–3	(Ukraine) Elina Svitolina (Ukraine) Maryna Zanevska	(Netherlands) Kiki Bertens (Switzerland) Conny Perrin	(Ukraine) Maryna Zanevska (Georgia (country)) Sofia Shapatava (Belgium) An-Sophie Mestach (Ukraine) Elina Svitolina
April 18	Hvar, Croatia; Clay $10,000; Singles draw – Doubles draw	(Bosnia and Herzegovina) Ema Burgić; 7–5, 7–6^{(7–2)}	(Croatia) Donna Vekić	(France) Marion Gaud (Italy) Evelyn Mayr	(France) Gracia Radovanovic (Croatia) Iva Mekoveć (Romania) Larisa Sporea (Croatia) Maria Abramović
April 18	Hvar, Croatia; Clay $10,000; Singles draw – Doubles draw	(Czech Republic) Martina Borecká (Czech Republic) Martina Kubičíková; 6–0, 6–2	(Romania) Ionela-Andreea Iova (Slovakia) Zuzana Zlochová	(France) Marion Gaud (Italy) Evelyn Mayr	(France) Gracia Radovanovic (Croatia) Iva Mekoveć (Romania) Larisa Sporea (Croatia) Maria Abramović
April 18	Antalya, Turkey; Hard $10,000; Singles draw – Doubles draw	(Russia) Marta Sirotkina; 6–1, 6–0	(Russia) Yana Buchina	(Poland) Sandra Zaniewska (France) Charlotte Rodier	(Romania) Laura-Ioana Andrei (Bulgaria) Isabella Shinikova (Germany) Sabrina Baumgarten (Israel) Keren Shlomo
April 18	Antalya, Turkey; Hard $10,000; Singles draw – Doubles draw	(Romania) Laura-Ioana Andrei (Poland) Sylwia Zagórska; 6–1, 7–6^{(7–0)}	(Russia) Marta Sirotkina (Russia) Maria Zharkova	(Poland) Sandra Zaniewska (France) Charlotte Rodier	(Romania) Laura-Ioana Andrei (Bulgaria) Isabella Shinikova (Germany) Sabrina Baumgarten (Israel) Keren Shlomo
April 18	Torrent, Spain; Clay $10,000; Singles draw – Doubles draw	(Spain) Garbiñe Muguruza; 6–1, 6–3	(Venezuela) Marina Giral Lores	(Croatia) Tereza Mrdeža (Italy) Alice Balducci	(France) Victoria Larrière (Switzerland) Viktorija Golubic (Spain) Arabela Fernández Rabener (Italy) Vivienne Vierin
April 18	Torrent, Spain; Clay $10,000; Singles draw – Doubles draw	(Czech Republic) Simona Dobrá (Czech Republic) Tereza Hladíková; 6–4, 2–6, [10–4]	(Spain) Yvonne Cavallé-Reimers (Spain) Isabel Rapisarda-Calvo	(Croatia) Tereza Mrdeža (Italy) Alice Balducci	(France) Victoria Larrière (Switzerland) Viktorija Golubic (Spain) Arabela Fernández Rabener (Italy) Vivienne Vierin
April 18	Karshi, Uzbekistan; Hard $10,000; Singles draw – Doubles draw	(Russia) Ekaterina Yashina; 6–2, 6–3	(Georgia (country)) Sofia Kvatsabaia	(Ukraine) Elizaveta Ianchuk (Uzbekistan) Nigina Abduraimova	(Uzbekistan) Sabina Sharipova (Russia) Aminat Kushkhova (Russia) Eugeniya Pashkova (Japan) Kanae Hisami
April 18	Karshi, Uzbekistan; Hard $10,000; Singles draw – Doubles draw	(Uzbekistan) Nigina Abduraimova (Uzbekistan) Albina Khabibulina; 6–1, 6–2	(Ukraine) Anna Shkudun (Russia) Ekaterina Yashina	(Ukraine) Elizaveta Ianchuk (Uzbekistan) Nigina Abduraimova	(Uzbekistan) Sabina Sharipova (Russia) Aminat Kushkhova (Russia) Eugeniya Pashkova (Japan) Kanae Hisami
April 18	Caracas, Venezuela; Hard $10,000; Singles draw – Doubles draw	(Croatia) Indire Akiki; 6–0, 6–2	(United States) Amanda McDowell	(Chile) Andrea Koch Benvenuto (Colombia) Karen Castiblanco	(Czech Republic) Kateřina Kramperová (Venezuela) Gabriela Coglitore (Ukraine) Anastasia Kharchenko (United States) Lena Litvak
April 18	Caracas, Venezuela; Hard $10,000; Singles draw – Doubles draw	(Cuba) Misleydis Díaz González (Cuba) Yamile Fors Guerra; 3–6, 6–3, [10–8]	(Ukraine) Anastasia Kharchenko (Belarus) Viktoryia Kisialeva	(Chile) Andrea Koch Benvenuto (Colombia) Karen Castiblanco	(Czech Republic) Kateřina Kramperová (Venezuela) Gabriela Coglitore (Ukraine) Anastasia Kharchenko (United States) Lena Litvak
April 18	Córdoba, Argentina; Clay $10,000; Singles draw – Doubles draw	(Chile) Daniela Seguel; 7–6^{(7–4)}, 0–6, 6–4	(Paraguay) Verónica Cepede Royg	(Slovakia) Viktória Maľová (Argentina) Aranza Salut	(Argentina) Catalina Pella (Argentina) Carla Lucero (Chile) Camila Silva (Argentina) Carolina Zeballos
April 18	Córdoba, Argentina; Clay $10,000; Singles draw – Doubles draw	(Paraguay) Verónica Cepede Royg (Argentina) Luciana Sarmenti; 6–2, 6–0	(Argentina) Sofia Luini (Argentina) Aranza Salut	(Slovakia) Viktória Maľová (Argentina) Aranza Salut	(Argentina) Catalina Pella (Argentina) Carla Lucero (Chile) Camila Silva (Argentina) Carolina Zeballos
April 25	Charlottesville, Virginia, United States; Clay $50,000; Singles draw – Doubles draw	(Canada) Stéphanie Dubois; 1–6, 7–6^{(7–5)}, 6–1	(Portugal) Michelle Larcher de Brito	(Romania) Edina Gallovits-Hall (United States) Julie Ditty	(Italy) Camila Giorgi (France) Claire de Gubernatis (Croatia) Ajla Tomljanović (United States) Ashley Weinhold
April 25	Charlottesville, Virginia, United States; Clay $50,000; Singles draw – Doubles draw	(Canada) Sharon Fichman (Canada) Marie-Ève Pelletier; 6–4, 6–3	(United States) Julie Ditty (United States) Carly Gullickson	(Romania) Edina Gallovits-Hall (United States) Julie Ditty	(Italy) Camila Giorgi (France) Claire de Gubernatis (Croatia) Ajla Tomljanović (United States) Ashley Weinhold
April 25	Gifu, Japan; Hard $50,000; Singles draw – Doubles draw	(Japan) Sachie Ishizu; 6–1, 6–3	(United Kingdom) Emily Webley-Smith	(Japan) Yurika Sema (Japan) Chinami Ogi	(United Kingdom) Katie O'Brien (Chinese Taipei) Chan Yung-jan (China) Zheng Saisai (Chinese Taipei) Hsu Wen-hsin
April 25	Gifu, Japan; Hard $50,000; Singles draw – Doubles draw	(Chinese Taipei) Chan Hao-ching (Chinese Taipei) Chan Yung-jan; 6–2, 6–3	(Thailand) Noppawan Lertcheewakarn (Japan) Erika Sema	(Japan) Yurika Sema (Japan) Chinami Ogi	(United Kingdom) Katie O'Brien (Chinese Taipei) Chan Yung-jan (China) Zheng Saisai (Chinese Taipei) Hsu Wen-hsin
April 25	Chiasso, Switzerland; Clay $25,000; Singles draw – Doubles draw	(Puerto Rico) Monica Puig; 7–6^{(7–4)}, 7–5	(Czech Republic) Andrea Hlaváčková	(Ukraine) Mariya Koryttseva (Netherlands) Bibiane Schoofs	(New Zealand) Sacha Jones (Germany) Anne Schäfer (Czech Republic) Petra Cetkovská (Austria) Patricia Mayr-Achleitner
April 25	Chiasso, Switzerland; Clay $25,000; Singles draw – Doubles draw	(Austria) Yvonne Meusburger (Germany) Kathrin Wörle; 6–3, 6–3	(France) Claire Feuerstein (France) Anaïs Laurendon	(Ukraine) Mariya Koryttseva (Netherlands) Bibiane Schoofs	(New Zealand) Sacha Jones (Germany) Anne Schäfer (Czech Republic) Petra Cetkovská (Austria) Patricia Mayr-Achleitner
April 25	Karshi, Uzbekistan; Hard $25,000; Singles draw – Doubles draw	(Australia) Isabella Holland; 7–5, 6–4	(Ukraine) Tetyana Arefyeva	(Ukraine) Oksana Lyubtsova (Ukraine) Kateryna Kozlova	(Russia) Eugeniya Pashkova (China) Liang Chen (Russia) Aminat Kushkhova (South Korea) Han Sung-hee
April 25	Karshi, Uzbekistan; Hard $25,000; Singles draw – Doubles draw	(Ukraine) Tetyana Arefyeva (Russia) Eugeniya Pashkova; 6–7^{(1–7)}, 7–5, [10–7]	(United Kingdom) Naomi Broady (Australia) Isabella Holland	(Ukraine) Oksana Lyubtsova (Ukraine) Kateryna Kozlova	(Russia) Eugeniya Pashkova (China) Liang Chen (Russia) Aminat Kushkhova (South Korea) Han Sung-hee
April 25	San Severo, Italy; Clay $10,000; Singles draw – Doubles draw	(France) Olivia Sanchez; 6–2, 6–1	(Italy) Alice Moroni	(Italy) Claudia Giovine (Russia) Yuliya Kalabina	(Bulgaria) Martina Gledacheva (Italy) Valentina Sulpizio (Italy) Gabriella Polito (Italy) Nastassya Burnett
April 25	San Severo, Italy; Clay $10,000; Singles draw – Doubles draw	(Bulgaria) Martina Gledacheva (Italy) Valentina Sulpizio; 6–2, 6–1	(Italy) Adriana Lavoretti (Switzerland) Mirjam Zeller	(Italy) Claudia Giovine (Russia) Yuliya Kalabina	(Bulgaria) Martina Gledacheva (Italy) Valentina Sulpizio (Italy) Gabriella Polito (Italy) Nastassya Burnett
April 25	Antalya, Turkey; Hard $10,000; Singles draw – Doubles draw	(Russia) Yana Buchina; 6–3, 6–4	(Georgia (country)) Ekaterine Gorgodze	(Russia) Maria Zharkova (Germany) Katharina Lehnert	(Germany) Jasmin Steinherr (Belarus) Ksenia Milevskaya (Germany) Sabrina Baumgarten (Russia) Alexandra Romanova
April 25	Antalya, Turkey; Hard $10,000; Singles draw – Doubles draw	(Romania) Laura-Ioana Andrei (Georgia (country)) Ekaterine Gorgodze; 6–1, 7–5	(Russia) Alexandra Romanova (Russia) Maria Zharkova	(Russia) Maria Zharkova (Germany) Katharina Lehnert	(Germany) Jasmin Steinherr (Belarus) Ksenia Milevskaya (Germany) Sabrina Baumgarten (Russia) Alexandra Romanova
April 25	Zell am Harmersbach, Germany; Clay $10,000; Singles draw – Doubles draw	(Germany) Carina Witthöft; 4–6, 6–3, 6–4	(Germany) Vanessa Henke	(Czech Republic) Martina Kubičíková (Germany) Christina Shakovets	(Italy) Agnese Zucchini (Austria) Iris Khanna (Romania) Mihaela Buzărnescu (Czech Republic) Petra Krejsová
April 25	Zell am Harmersbach, Germany; Clay $10,000; Singles draw – Doubles draw	(Netherlands) Marcella Koek (Netherlands) Eva Wacanno; 6–1, 6–4	(Germany) Desiree Schelenz (Germany) Christina Shakovets	(Czech Republic) Martina Kubičíková (Germany) Christina Shakovets	(Italy) Agnese Zucchini (Austria) Iris Khanna (Romania) Mihaela Buzărnescu (Czech Republic) Petra Krejsová
April 25	Aegon GB Pro-Series Bournemouth; Bournemouth, United Kingdom; Clay $10,000; Singles draw – Doubles draw	(Germany) Scarlett Werner; 6–3, 7–5	(Slovakia) Romana Tabak	(United Kingdom) Francesca Stephenson (United Kingdom) Jade Windley	(Republic of Ireland) Julia Moriarty (Italy) Alice Balducci (Germany) Alina Wessel (United Kingdom) Katie Boulter
April 25	Aegon GB Pro-Series Bournemouth; Bournemouth, United Kingdom; Clay $10,000; Singles draw – Doubles draw	(South Africa) Surina de Beer (United Kingdom) Francesca Stephenson; 6–2, 6–2	(Germany) Scarlett Werner (Germany) Alina Wessel	(United Kingdom) Francesca Stephenson (United Kingdom) Jade Windley	(Republic of Ireland) Julia Moriarty (Italy) Alice Balducci (Germany) Alina Wessel (United Kingdom) Katie Boulter
April 25	Vic, Spain; Clay $10,000; Singles draw – Doubles draw	(Greece) Despina Papamichail; 7–6^{(10–8)}, 6–1	(France) Victoria Larrière	(Spain) Garbiñe Muguruza (Croatia) Tereza Mrdeža	(Mexico) Ximena Hermoso (Venezuela) Andrea Gámiz (Czech Republic) Simona Dobrá (France) Charlene Seateun
April 25	Vic, Spain; Clay $10,000; Singles draw – Doubles draw	(Czech Republic) Simona Dobrá (Czech Republic) Tereza Hladíková; 6–2, 6–1	(Venezuela) Andrea Gámiz (Greece) Despina Papamichail	(Spain) Garbiñe Muguruza (Croatia) Tereza Mrdeža	(Mexico) Ximena Hermoso (Venezuela) Andrea Gámiz (Czech Republic) Simona Dobrá (France) Charlene Seateun
April 25	São Paulo, Brazil; Clay $10,000; Singles draw – Doubles draw	(Argentina) Andrea Benítez; 7–6^{(7–4)}, 4–6, 6–2	(Germany) Karolina Nowak	(Brazil) Nathalia Rossi (Brazil) Eduarda Piai	(Brazil) Nathaly Kurata (Brazil) Monique Albuquerque (Argentina) Tatiana Búa (Brazil) Fernanda Hermenegildo
April 25	São Paulo, Brazil; Clay $10,000; Singles draw – Doubles draw	(Brazil) Gabriela Cé (Brazil) Carla Forte; 7–6^{(7–5)}, 6–4	(Brazil) Isabela Miró (Brazil) Nathalia Rossi	(Brazil) Nathalia Rossi (Brazil) Eduarda Piai	(Brazil) Nathaly Kurata (Brazil) Monique Albuquerque (Argentina) Tatiana Búa (Brazil) Fernanda Hermenegildo
April 25	Bangkok, Thailand; Hard $10,000; Singles draw – Doubles draw	(Japan) Misa Eguchi; 6–1, 6–1	(China) Lu Jiajing	(Thailand) Luksika Kumkhum (China) Zhao Yijing	(Russia) Anna Tyulpa (Indonesia) Jessy Rompies (China) Hu Yueyue (Thailand) Nungnadda Wannasuk
April 25	Bangkok, Thailand; Hard $10,000; Singles draw – Doubles draw	(China) Li Ting (Japan) Ai Yamamoto; 7–6^{(8–6)}, 6–4	(Thailand) Napatsakorn Sankaew (China) Yang Zi	(Thailand) Luksika Kumkhum (China) Zhao Yijing	(Russia) Anna Tyulpa (Indonesia) Jessy Rompies (China) Hu Yueyue (Thailand) Nungnadda Wannasuk
April 25	Minsk, Belarus; Hard $25,000; Singles draw – Doubles draw	(Russia) Olga Puchkova; 6–2, 7–5	(Ukraine) Nadiia Kichenok	(Lithuania) Lina Stančiūtė (Serbia) Teodora Mirčić	(Belarus) Polina Pekhova (Ukraine) Lyudmyla Kichenok (Serbia) Aleksandra Krunić (Ukraine) Anastasiya Vasylyeva
April 25	Minsk, Belarus; Hard $25,000; Singles draw – Doubles draw	(Ukraine) Lyudmyla Kichenok (Ukraine) Nadiia Kichenok; 6–1, 6–2	(Serbia) Teodora Mirčić (Austria) Nicole Rottmann	(Lithuania) Lina Stančiūtė (Serbia) Teodora Mirčić	(Belarus) Polina Pekhova (Ukraine) Lyudmyla Kichenok (Serbia) Aleksandra Krunić (Ukraine) Anastasiya Vasylyeva

== May ==
Week of	Tournament	Winner	Runners-up	Semifinalists	Quarterfinalists
May 2	Indian Harbour Beach, Florida, United States; Clay $50,000; Singles draw – Doubles draw	(Hungary) Melinda Czink; 4–6, 6–1, 6–4	(United States) Alison Riske	(United Kingdom) Laura Robson (United States) Irina Falconi	(United States) Alexa Glatch (Bolivia) María Fernanda Álvarez Terán (United States) Chiara Scholl (United States) Jessica Pegula
May 2	Indian Harbour Beach, Florida, United States; Clay $50,000; Singles draw – Doubles draw	(Ukraine) Alyona Sotnikova (Slovakia) Lenka Wienerová; 6–4, 6–3	(United States) Christina Fusano (United States) Alexa Glatch	(United Kingdom) Laura Robson (United States) Irina Falconi	(United States) Alexa Glatch (Bolivia) María Fernanda Álvarez Terán (United States) Chiara Scholl (United States) Jessica Pegula
May 2	Bukhara, Uzbekistan; Hard $25,000; Singles draw – Doubles draw	(Austria) Nikola Hofmanova; 6–4, 7–5	(Russia) Marta Sirotkina	(Ukraine) Kateryna Kozlova (United Kingdom) Naomi Broady	(Russia) Nina Bratchikova (Belarus) Polina Pekhova (Australia) Isabella Holland (Ukraine) Tetyana Arefyeva
May 2	Bukhara, Uzbekistan; Hard $25,000; Singles draw – Doubles draw	(South Korea) Han Sung-hee (China) Liang Chen; 4–6, 7–6^{(7–5)}, [10–5]	(Russia) Nina Bratchikova (Kyrgyzstan) Ksenia Palkina	(Ukraine) Kateryna Kozlova (United Kingdom) Naomi Broady	(Russia) Nina Bratchikova (Belarus) Polina Pekhova (Australia) Isabella Holland (Ukraine) Tetyana Arefyeva
May 2	Casarano, Italy; Clay $10,000; Singles draw – Doubles draw	(Russia) Irina Khromacheva; 6–3, 6–4	(Germany) Anne Schäfer	(Italy) Valentina Sulpizio (Italy) Giulia Gatto-Monticone	(Hong Kong) Zhang Ling (Italy) Annalisa Bona (Italy) Paola Cigui (Italy) Federica Quercia
May 2	Casarano, Italy; Clay $10,000; Singles draw – Doubles draw	(Italy) Giulia Gatto-Monticone (Italy) Federica Quercia; 7–5, 2–6, [10–5]	(Italy) Benedetta Davato (Italy) Federica Grazioso	(Italy) Valentina Sulpizio (Italy) Giulia Gatto-Monticone	(Hong Kong) Zhang Ling (Italy) Annalisa Bona (Italy) Paola Cigui (Italy) Federica Quercia
May 2	Istanbul, Turkey; Hard $10,000; Singles draw – Doubles draw	(Georgia (country)) Sofia Kvatsabaia; 6–2, 6–1	(Belarus) Ksenia Milevskaya	(Romania) Laura-Ioana Andrei (Italy) Andreea Văideanu	(Russia) Yana Orlova (Germany) Jasmin Steinherr (Italy) Stephanie Scimone (Slovenia) Anja Prislan
May 2	Istanbul, Turkey; Hard $10,000; Singles draw – Doubles draw	(Romania) Laura-Ioana Andrei (Georgia (country)) Sofia Kvatsabaia; 6–2, 6–2	(Bulgaria) Dessislava Mladenova (Slovenia) Anja Prislan	(Romania) Laura-Ioana Andrei (Italy) Andreea Văideanu	(Russia) Yana Orlova (Germany) Jasmin Steinherr (Italy) Stephanie Scimone (Slovenia) Anja Prislan
May 2	Wiesbaden, Germany; Clay $10,000; Singles draw – Doubles draw	(Colombia) Yuliana Lizarazo; 6–1, 7–6^{(7–5)}	(Netherlands) Marcella Koek	(Romania) Mihaela Buzărnescu (Australia) Karolina Wlodarczak	(Poland) Barbara Sobaszkiewicz (France) Myrtille Georges (Germany) Stephanie Wagner (Germany) Katharina Lehnert
May 2	Wiesbaden, Germany; Clay $10,000; Singles draw – Doubles draw	(Romania) Mihaela Buzărnescu (Australia) Karolina Wlodarczak; 6–7^{(4–7)}, 6–3, [10–6]	(Germany) Dejana Raickovic (Netherlands) Ghislaine van Baal	(Romania) Mihaela Buzărnescu (Australia) Karolina Wlodarczak	(Poland) Barbara Sobaszkiewicz (France) Myrtille Georges (Germany) Stephanie Wagner (Germany) Katharina Lehnert
May 2	Aegon GB Pro-Series Edinburgh; Edinburgh, United Kingdom; Clay $10,000; Singles draw – Doubles draw	(Belgium) Alison Van Uytvanck; 6–7^{(5–7)}, 6–4, 6–2	(Poland) Justyna Jegiołka	(Italy) Carolina Orsi (Germany) Scarlett Werner	(Germany) Bianca Koch (United Kingdom) Lucy Brown (United Kingdom) Jade Windley (Belgium) Valerie Verhamme
May 2	Aegon GB Pro-Series Edinburgh; Edinburgh, United Kingdom; Clay $10,000; Singles draw – Doubles draw	(United Kingdom) Samantha Murray (United Kingdom) Jade Windley; 7–5, 4–6, [10–8]	(South Africa) Surina de Beer (Germany) Scarlett Werner	(Italy) Carolina Orsi (Germany) Scarlett Werner	(Germany) Bianca Koch (United Kingdom) Lucy Brown (United Kingdom) Jade Windley (Belgium) Valerie Verhamme
May 2	Hyderabad, India; Hard $10,000; Singles draw – Doubles draw	(Israel) Keren Shlomo; 6–1, 6–4	(South Korea) Han Na-lae	(South Korea) Lee So-ra (Japan) Misa Kinoshita	(India) Prerna Bhambri (Japan) Etsuko Kitazaki (United Kingdom) Manisha Foster (India) Rushmi Chakravarthi
May 2	Hyderabad, India; Hard $10,000; Singles draw – Doubles draw	(South Korea) Han Na-lae (South Korea) Lee So-ra; 6–3, 6–2	(India) Sowjanya Bavisetti (India) Natasha Palha	(South Korea) Lee So-ra (Japan) Misa Kinoshita	(India) Prerna Bhambri (Japan) Etsuko Kitazaki (United Kingdom) Manisha Foster (India) Rushmi Chakravarthi
May 2	Bangkok, Thailand; Hard $10,000; Singles draw – Doubles draw	(Thailand) Luksika Kumkhum; 6–2, 6–2	(Indonesia) Ayu-Fani Damayanti	(China) Zhao Yijing (China) Lu Jiajing	(China) Zhu Lin (Indonesia) Jessy Rompies (Japan) Misa Eguchi (Japan) Emi Mutaguchi
May 2	Bangkok, Thailand; Hard $10,000; Singles draw – Doubles draw	(Indonesia) Jessy Rompies (Indonesia) Grace Sari Ysidora; 3–6, 6–4, [10–5]	(Indonesia) Ayu-Fani Damayanti (Indonesia) Lavinia Tananta	(China) Zhao Yijing (China) Lu Jiajing	(China) Zhu Lin (Indonesia) Jessy Rompies (Japan) Misa Eguchi (Japan) Emi Mutaguchi
May 2	2011 Open GDF Suez de Cagnes-sur-Mer Alpes-Maritimes; Cagnes-sur-Mer, France; Clay $100,000+H; Singles – Doubles	(Romania) Sorana Cîrstea; 6–7^{(5–7)}, 6–2, 6–2	(France) Pauline Parmentier	(United Kingdom) Elena Baltacha (Italy) Maria Elena Camerin	(Germany) Kristina Barrois (China) Zhang Shuai (Russia) Anastasia Pivovarova (Spain) Lara Arruabarrena
May 2	2011 Open GDF Suez de Cagnes-sur-Mer Alpes-Maritimes; Cagnes-sur-Mer, France; Clay $100,000+H; Singles – Doubles	(Germany) Anna-Lena Grönefeld (Croatia) Petra Martić; 1–6, 6–2, [11–9]	(Croatia) Darija Jurak (Czech Republic) Renata Voráčová	(United Kingdom) Elena Baltacha (Italy) Maria Elena Camerin	(Germany) Kristina Barrois (China) Zhang Shuai (Russia) Anastasia Pivovarova (Spain) Lara Arruabarrena
May 2	2011 Fukuoka International Women's Cup; Fukuoka, Japan; Carpet $50,000; Singles – Doubles	(Thailand) Tamarine Tanasugarn; 6–4, 5–7, 7–5	(Chinese Taipei) Chan Yung-jan	(Japan) Aiko Nakamura (Japan) Kumiko Iijima	(Japan) Natsumi Hamamura (Japan) Erika Takao (United Kingdom) Emily Webley-Smith (Japan) Erika Sema
May 2	2011 Fukuoka International Women's Cup; Fukuoka, Japan; Carpet $50,000; Singles – Doubles	(Japan) Shuko Aoyama (Japan) Rika Fujiwara; 7–6^{(7–3)}, 6–0	(Japan) Aiko Nakamura (Japan) Junri Namigata	(Japan) Aiko Nakamura (Japan) Kumiko Iijima	(Japan) Natsumi Hamamura (Japan) Erika Takao (United Kingdom) Emily Webley-Smith (Japan) Erika Sema
May 2	2011 Strabag Prague Open; Prague, Czech Republic; Clay $50,000; Singles – Doubles	(Czech Republic) Lucie Hradecká; 4–6, 6–3, 6–2	(Argentina) Paula Ormaechea	(Austria) Yvonne Meusburger (Italy) Romina Oprandi	(Luxembourg) Mandy Minella (Austria) Patricia Mayr-Achleitner (Ukraine) Olga Savchuk (Netherlands) Michaëlla Krajicek
May 2	2011 Strabag Prague Open; Prague, Czech Republic; Clay $50,000; Singles – Doubles	(Belarus) Darya Kustova (Russia) Arina Rodionova; 2–6, 6–1, [10–7]	(Ukraine) Olga Savchuk (Ukraine) Lesia Tsurenko	(Austria) Yvonne Meusburger (Italy) Romina Oprandi	(Luxembourg) Mandy Minella (Austria) Patricia Mayr-Achleitner (Ukraine) Olga Savchuk (Netherlands) Michaëlla Krajicek
May 2	Gran Canaria – Maspalomas, Spain; Clay $10,000; Singles draw – Doubles draw	(Spain) Sandra Soler Sola; 3–6, 6–1, 6–4	(Spain) Rocío de la Torre Sánchez	(Netherlands) Lisanne van Riet (Mexico) Ximena Hermoso	(France) Stéphanie Vongsouthi (Japan) Yuka Mori (Spain) Claudia Lorenzo Fernández (Spain) Isabel Rapisarda Calvo
May 2	Gran Canaria – Maspalomas, Spain; Clay $10,000; Singles draw – Doubles draw	(Mexico) Ximena Hermoso (Mexico) Ivette López; 6–2, 6–3	(Italy) Martina Caciotti (Italy) Nicole Clerico	(Netherlands) Lisanne van Riet (Mexico) Ximena Hermoso	(France) Stéphanie Vongsouthi (Japan) Yuka Mori (Spain) Claudia Lorenzo Fernández (Spain) Isabel Rapisarda Calvo
May 2	Athens-Petroupoli, Greece; Hard $10,000; Singles draw – Doubles draw	(Latvia) Diāna Marcinkēviča; 5–7, 7–5, 6–3	(Greece) Despina Papamichail	(Russia) Alexandra Artamonova (Austria) Nicole Rottmann	(Czech Republic) Zuzana Linhová (Germany) Kim Grajdek (Switzerland) Clelia Melena (Slovakia) Petra Jurová
May 2	Athens-Petroupoli, Greece; Hard $10,000; Singles draw – Doubles draw	(Germany) Kim Grajdek (Czech Republic) Zuzana Linhová; 3–6, 6–3, [10–6]	(Russia) Alexandra Artamonova (Latvia) Diāna Marcinkēviča	(Russia) Alexandra Artamonova (Austria) Nicole Rottmann	(Czech Republic) Zuzana Linhová (Germany) Kim Grajdek (Switzerland) Clelia Melena (Slovakia) Petra Jurová
May 9	2011 Sparta Prague Open; Prague, Czech Republic; Clay $100,000; Singles – Doubles	(Slovakia) Magdaléna Rybáriková; 6–3, 6–4	(Czech Republic) Petra Kvitová	(Serbia) Aleksandra Krunić (Czech Republic) Petra Cetkovská	(France) Mathilde Johansson (Czech Republic) Denisa Allertová (Russia) Ksenia Pervak (Czech Republic) Klára Zakopalová
May 9	2011 Sparta Prague Open; Prague, Czech Republic; Clay $100,000; Singles – Doubles	(Czech Republic) Petra Cetkovská (Netherlands) Michaëlla Krajicek; 6–2, 6–1	(United States) Lindsay Lee-Waters (United States) Megan Moulton-Levy	(Serbia) Aleksandra Krunić (Czech Republic) Petra Cetkovská	(France) Mathilde Johansson (Czech Republic) Denisa Allertová (Russia) Ksenia Pervak (Czech Republic) Klára Zakopalová
May 9	2011 Kurume Best Amenity International Women's Tennis; Kurume, Fukuoka, Japan; Grass $50,000; Singles – Doubles	(Japan) Rika Fujiwara; 6–3, 6–1	(Australia) Monique Adamczak	(China) Zheng Saisai (Japan) Shiho Akita	(Japan) Akiko Omae (Japan) Erika Sema (Chinese Taipei) Hsu Wen-hsin (Japan) Sachie Ishizu
May 9	2011 Kurume Best Amenity International Women's Tennis; Kurume, Fukuoka, Japan; Grass $50,000; Singles – Doubles	(Japan) Ayumi Oka (Japan) Akiko Yonemura; 6–3, 5–7, [10–8]	(Japan) Rika Fujiwara (Thailand) Tamarine Tanasugarn	(China) Zheng Saisai (Japan) Shiho Akita	(Japan) Akiko Omae (Japan) Erika Sema (Chinese Taipei) Hsu Wen-hsin (Japan) Sachie Ishizu
May 9	2011 Open International Féminin Midi-Pyrénées Saint-Gaudens Comminges; Saint-Gaudens, France; Clay $50,000+H; Singles – Doubles	(Russia) Anastasia Pivovarova; 7–6^{(7–4)}, 6–7^{(3–7)}, 6–2	(Netherlands) Arantxa Rus	(Russia) Valeria Savinykh (Russia) Vesna Dolonts	(Greece) Irini Georgatou (Ukraine) Elina Svitolina (France) Pauline Parmentier (Georgia (country)) Anna Tatishvili
May 9	2011 Open International Féminin Midi-Pyrénées Saint-Gaudens Comminges; Saint-Gaudens, France; Clay $50,000+H; Singles – Doubles	(France) Caroline Garcia (France) Aurélie Védy; 6–3, 6–3	(Russia) Anastasia Pivovarova (Ukraine) Olga Savchuk	(Russia) Valeria Savinykh (Russia) Vesna Dolonts	(Greece) Irini Georgatou (Ukraine) Elina Svitolina (France) Pauline Parmentier (Georgia (country)) Anna Tatishvili
May 9	2011 RBC Bank Women's Challenger; Raleigh, North Carolina, United States; Clay $50,000; Singles – Doubles	(Slovenia) Petra Rampre; 6–3, 6–2	(Italy) Camila Giorgi	(Canada) Marie-Ève Pelletier (United States) Julia Boserup	(Russia) Valeria Solovyeva (United States) Alexa Glatch (United States) Asia Muhammad (United States) Shelby Rogers
May 9	2011 RBC Bank Women's Challenger; Raleigh, North Carolina, United States; Clay $50,000; Singles – Doubles	(Canada) Sharon Fichman (Canada) Marie-Ève Pelletier; 6–1, 6–3	(United States) Beatrice Capra (United States) Asia Muhammad	(Canada) Marie-Ève Pelletier (United States) Julia Boserup	(Russia) Valeria Solovyeva (United States) Alexa Glatch (United States) Asia Muhammad (United States) Shelby Rogers
May 9	2011 Camparini Gioielli Cup – Trofeo Pompea; Reggio Emilia, Italy; Clay $50,000; Singles – Doubles	(United States) Sloane Stephens; 6–3, 6–1	(Belarus) Anastasiya Yakimova	(Russia) Ekaterina Ivanova (Germany) Sabine Lisicki	(Croatia) Ajla Tomljanović (Australia) Sophie Ferguson (Romania) Liana Ungur (New Zealand) Marina Erakovic
May 9	2011 Camparini Gioielli Cup – Trofeo Pompea; Reggio Emilia, Italy; Clay $50,000; Singles – Doubles	(Australia) Sophie Ferguson (Australia) Sally Peers; 6–4, 6–1	(Italy) Claudia Giovine (Argentina) María Irigoyen	(Russia) Ekaterina Ivanova (Germany) Sabine Lisicki	(Croatia) Ajla Tomljanović (Australia) Sophie Ferguson (Romania) Liana Ungur (New Zealand) Marina Erakovic
May 9	2011 Zagreb Open; Zagreb, Croatia; Clay $25,000; Singles – Doubles	(France) Nathalie Piquion; 6–3, 3–6, 6–1	(Serbia) Doroteja Erić	(Slovenia) Nastja Kolar (Ukraine) Yuliya Beygelzimer	(Bulgaria) Elitsa Kostova (Kazakhstan) Galina Voskoboeva (Hungary) Réka-Luca Jani (Slovenia) Tadeja Majerič
May 9	2011 Zagreb Open; Zagreb, Croatia; Clay $25,000; Singles – Doubles	(Bulgaria) Elitsa Kostova (Poland) Barbara Sobaszkiewicz; 1–6, 6–3, [12–10]	(Croatia) Ani Mijačika (Croatia) Ana Vrljić	(Slovenia) Nastja Kolar (Ukraine) Yuliya Beygelzimer	(Bulgaria) Elitsa Kostova (Kazakhstan) Galina Voskoboeva (Hungary) Réka-Luca Jani (Slovenia) Tadeja Majerič
May 9	Båstad, Sweden; Clay $10,000; Singles draw – Doubles draw	(Slovakia) Romana Tabak; 7–5, 6–7^{(2–7)}, 6–2	(Poland) Olga Brózda	(Germany) Carina Witthöft (Colombia) Yuliana Lizarazo	(Germany) Karolina Nowak (Poland) Sylwia Zagórska (Sweden) Anna Brazhnikova (Russia) Yulia Putintseva
May 9	Båstad, Sweden; Clay $10,000; Singles draw – Doubles draw	(Poland) Olga Brózda (Poland) Natalia Kołat; 7–6^{(7–3)}, 6–2	(Colombia) Yuliana Lizarazo (Germany) Alina Wessel	(Germany) Carina Witthöft (Colombia) Yuliana Lizarazo	(Germany) Karolina Nowak (Poland) Sylwia Zagórska (Sweden) Anna Brazhnikova (Russia) Yulia Putintseva
May 9	Bangkok, Thailand; Hard $10,000; Singles draw – Doubles draw	(Thailand) Luksika Kumkhum; 6–1, 6–0	(Thailand) Peangtarn Plipuech	(China) Hu Yueyue (South Korea) Yoo Mi	(China) Lu Jia Xiang (Indonesia) Ayu-Fani Damayanti (China) Li Ting (Thailand) Nicha Lertpitaksinchai
May 9	Bangkok, Thailand; Hard $10,000; Singles draw – Doubles draw	(China) Li Ting (China) Zhao Yijing; 6–7^{(2–7)}, 6–4, [13–11]	(Indonesia) Ayu-Fani Damayanti (Indonesia) Lavinia Tananta	(China) Hu Yueyue (South Korea) Yoo Mi	(China) Lu Jia Xiang (Indonesia) Ayu-Fani Damayanti (China) Li Ting (Thailand) Nicha Lertpitaksinchai
May 9	New Delhi, India; Hard $10,000; Singles draw – Doubles draw	(Israel) Keren Shlomo; 2–6, 6–2, 6–2	(Japan) Misa Kinoshita	(United Kingdom) Manisha Foster (India) Prerna Bhambri	(Japan) Etsuko Kitazaki (Germany) Jessica Sabeshinskaja (South Korea) Jang Su-jeong (India) Ankita Raina
May 9	New Delhi, India; Hard $10,000; Singles draw – Doubles draw	(India) Aishwarya Agrawal (India) Ankita Raina; 6–4, 6–3	(Oman) Fatma Al-Nabhani (India) Rushmi Chakravarthi	(United Kingdom) Manisha Foster (India) Prerna Bhambri	(Japan) Etsuko Kitazaki (Germany) Jessica Sabeshinskaja (South Korea) Jang Su-jeong (India) Ankita Raina
May 9	Tenerife, Spain; Hard $10,000; Singles draw – Doubles draw	(France) Victoria Larrière; 6–1, 6–1	(Mexico) Ximena Hermoso	(Spain) Rocío de la Torre Sánchez (Spain) Isabel Rapisarda Calvo	(Spain) Sandra Soler Sola (Spain) Silvia García Jimenez (Spain) Carmen López Rueda (Spain) Arabela Fernández Rabener
May 9	Tenerife, Spain; Hard $10,000; Singles draw – Doubles draw	(Mexico) Ximena Hermoso (Mexico) Ivette López; 6–4, 7–5	(Japan) Yuka Mori (Japan) Kaori Onishi	(Spain) Rocío de la Torre Sánchez (Spain) Isabel Rapisarda Calvo	(Spain) Sandra Soler Sola (Spain) Silvia García Jimenez (Spain) Carmen López Rueda (Spain) Arabela Fernández Rabener
May 9	Encarnación, Paraguay; Clay $10,000; Singles draw – Doubles draw	(Paraguay) Verónica Cepede Royg; 6–2, 6–2	(Argentina) Ornella Caron	(Argentina) Daniela Degano (Argentina) Barbara Montiel	(Argentina) Jordana Lujan (Brazil) Flávia Guimarães Bueno (Argentina) Guadalupe Moreno (Paraguay) Sara Giménez
May 9	Encarnación, Paraguay; Clay $10,000; Singles draw – Doubles draw	(Paraguay) Verónica Cepede Royg (Argentina) Luciana Sarmenti; 6–3, 6–2	(Argentina) Ornella Caron (Argentina) Jordana Lujan	(Argentina) Daniela Degano (Argentina) Barbara Montiel	(Argentina) Jordana Lujan (Brazil) Flávia Guimarães Bueno (Argentina) Guadalupe Moreno (Paraguay) Sara Giménez
May 9	Itaparica Island, Brazil; Hard $10,000; Singles draw – Doubles draw	(Argentina) Andrea Benítez; 6–2, 6–3	(Argentina) Aranza Salut	(Brazil) Carla Forte (Brazil) Nathalia Rossi	(Argentina) Carolina Zeballos (Chile) Daniela Seguel (Brazil) Nathaly Kurata (Brazil) Luisa Rosa
May 9	Itaparica Island, Brazil; Hard $10,000; Singles draw – Doubles draw	(Brazil) Nathalia Rossi (Chile) Daniela Seguel; 3–6, 6–0, [10–7]	(Argentina) Andrea Benítez (Brazil) Raquel Piltcher	(Brazil) Carla Forte (Brazil) Nathalia Rossi	(Argentina) Carolina Zeballos (Chile) Daniela Seguel (Brazil) Nathaly Kurata (Brazil) Luisa Rosa
May 9	Heraklion, Greece; Hard $10,000; Singles draw – Doubles draw	(Greece) Despina Papamichail; 6–1, 3–6, 6–2	(Austria) Nicole Rottmann	(United Kingdom) Samantha Murray (Germany) Kim Grajdek	(United Kingdom) Anna Fitzpatrick (Russia) Diana Arutyunova (Latvia) Diāna Marcinkēviča (Greece) Maria Sakkari
May 9	Heraklion, Greece; Hard $10,000; Singles draw – Doubles draw	(United Kingdom) Anna Fitzpatrick (United Kingdom) Samantha Murray; 6–3, 6–2	(United Kingdom) Amanda Elliott (Austria) Nicole Rottmann	(United Kingdom) Samantha Murray (Germany) Kim Grajdek	(United Kingdom) Anna Fitzpatrick (Russia) Diana Arutyunova (Latvia) Diāna Marcinkēviča (Greece) Maria Sakkari
May 9	Istanbul, Turkey; Hard $10,000; Singles draw – Doubles draw	(Germany) Jasmin Steinherr; 6–4, 6–2	(Italy) Andreea Văideanu	(Ukraine) Anastasiya Vasylyeva (Georgia (country)) Sofia Kvatsabaia	(Ukraine) Valeriya Strakhova (Romania) Diana Stomlega (Poland) Sandra Zaniewska (Israel) Valeria Patiuk
May 9	Istanbul, Turkey; Hard $10,000; Singles draw – Doubles draw	(Bulgaria) Dessislava Mladenova (Italy) Andreea Văideanu; 4–6, 6–1, [10–5]	(Ukraine) Anna Piven (Ukraine) Anastasiya Vasylyeva	(Ukraine) Anastasiya Vasylyeva (Georgia (country)) Sofia Kvatsabaia	(Ukraine) Valeriya Strakhova (Romania) Diana Stomlega (Poland) Sandra Zaniewska (Israel) Valeria Patiuk
May 16	Goyang, South Korea; Hard $25,000; Singles draw – Doubles draw	(South Africa) Chanel Simmonds; 6–7^{(9–11)}, 6–1, 7–6^{(7–3)}	(South Korea) Lee Ye-ra	(Japan) Yurika Sema (South Korea) Hong Hyun-hui	(South Korea) Kim Ju-eun (South Korea) Han Sung-hee (South Korea) Chae Kyung-yee (Bolivia) María Fernanda Álvarez Terán
May 16	Goyang, South Korea; Hard $25,000; Singles draw – Doubles draw	(South Korea) Kim Ji-young (South Korea) Yoo Mi; 6–2, 6–4	(South Korea) Kim Kun-hee (South Korea) Yu Min-hwa	(Japan) Yurika Sema (South Korea) Hong Hyun-hui	(South Korea) Kim Ju-eun (South Korea) Han Sung-hee (South Korea) Chae Kyung-yee (Bolivia) María Fernanda Álvarez Terán
May 16	2011 Internazionali Femminili di Tennis; Brescia, Italy; Clay $25,000; Singles – Doubles	(Ukraine) Irina Buryachok; 6–7^{(5–7)}, 6–2, 6–2	(Italy) Giulia Gatto-Monticone	(Puerto Rico) Monica Puig (Hungary) Réka-Luca Jani	(Romania) Elora Dabija (Italy) Anna Remondina (Italy) Karin Knapp (Romania) Diana Enache
May 16	2011 Internazionali Femminili di Tennis; Brescia, Italy; Clay $25,000; Singles – Doubles	(Colombia) Karen Castiblanco (Brazil) Fernanda Hermenegildo; 4–6, 6–3, [10–6]	(Italy) Evelyn Mayr (Italy) Julia Mayr	(Puerto Rico) Monica Puig (Hungary) Réka-Luca Jani	(Romania) Elora Dabija (Italy) Anna Remondina (Italy) Karin Knapp (Romania) Diana Enache
May 16	2011 Kültürpark Cup; İzmir, Turkey; Hard $25,000; Singles – Doubles	(Romania) Mihaela Buzărnescu; 7–5, 6–4	(United Kingdom) Naomi Broady	(Georgia (country)) Sofia Shapatava (Czech Republic) Eva Hrdinová	(United Kingdom) Tara Moore (Portugal) Magali de Lattre (Ukraine) Anna Piven (Turkey) Pemra Özgen
May 16	2011 Kültürpark Cup; İzmir, Turkey; Hard $25,000; Singles – Doubles	(United Kingdom) Naomi Broady (United Kingdom) Lisa Whybourn; 3–6, 7–6^{(7–4)}, [10–7]	(Romania) Mihaela Buzărnescu (Croatia) Tereza Mrdeža	(Georgia (country)) Sofia Shapatava (Czech Republic) Eva Hrdinová	(United Kingdom) Tara Moore (Portugal) Magali de Lattre (Ukraine) Anna Piven (Turkey) Pemra Özgen
May 16	Båstad, Sweden; Clay $10,000; Singles draw – Doubles draw	(Colombia) Yuliana Lizarazo; 6–2, 3–6, 6–2	(Sweden) Hilda Melander	(Poland) Olga Brózda (Sweden) Sandra Roma	(Norway) Emma Flood (Lithuania) Joana Eidukonytė (Finland) Ella Leivo (Republic of Ireland) Amy Bowtell
May 16	Båstad, Sweden; Clay $10,000; Singles draw – Doubles draw	(Poland) Olga Brózda (Poland) Natalia Kołat; 6–3, 6–1	(Sweden) Hilda Melander (Sweden) Paulina Milosavljevic	(Poland) Olga Brózda (Sweden) Sandra Roma	(Norway) Emma Flood (Lithuania) Joana Eidukonytė (Finland) Ella Leivo (Republic of Ireland) Amy Bowtell
May 16	Santa Coloma de Farners, Spain; Clay $10,000; Singles draw – Doubles draw	(Switzerland) Viktorija Golubic; 6–3, 6–3	(Spain) Inés Ferrer Suárez	(Germany) Nina Zander (Italy) Alice Balducci	(Spain) Eva Fernández Brugués (Netherlands) Marcella Koek (Bulgaria) Martina Gledacheva (Ukraine) Yevgeniya Kryvoruchko
May 16	Santa Coloma de Farners, Spain; Clay $10,000; Singles draw – Doubles draw	(Spain) Eva Fernández Brugués (Spain) Inés Ferrer Suárez; 6–3, 6–7^{(3–7)}, [10–4]	(Switzerland) Viktorija Golubic (Germany) Nina Zander	(Germany) Nina Zander (Italy) Alice Balducci	(Spain) Eva Fernández Brugués (Netherlands) Marcella Koek (Bulgaria) Martina Gledacheva (Ukraine) Yevgeniya Kryvoruchko
May 16	Landisville, Pennsylvania, United States; Hard $10,000; Singles draw – Doubles draw	(United States) Robin Anderson; 6–2, 6–3	(Australia) Bojana Bobusic	(Russia) Angelina Gabueva (United States) Brooke Austin	(Canada) Gabriela Dabrowski (Ukraine) Anastasia Kharchenko (United States) Chloe Jones (Russia) Nika Kukharchuk
May 16	Landisville, Pennsylvania, United States; Hard $10,000; Singles draw – Doubles draw	(United States) Chieh-yu Hsu (United Kingdom) Nicola Slater; 7–5, 6–3	(Australia) Brooke Rischbieth (Australia) Storm Sanders	(Russia) Angelina Gabueva (United States) Brooke Austin	(Canada) Gabriela Dabrowski (Ukraine) Anastasia Kharchenko (United States) Chloe Jones (Russia) Nika Kukharchuk
May 16	Durban, South Africa; Hard $10,000; Singles draw – Doubles draw	(Czech Republic) Kateřina Kramperová; 6–2, 6–0	(South Africa) Surina de Beer	(United Kingdom) Nicola George (Austria) Nicole Rottmann	(Austria) Jeannine Prentner (Italy) Lara Rafful (United Kingdom) Jennifer Allan (Russia) Julia Samuseva
May 16	Durban, South Africa; Hard $10,000; Singles draw – Doubles draw	(United Kingdom) Jennifer Allan (South Africa) Surina de Beer; 6–2, 4–6, [10–8]	(Denmark) Malou Ejdesgaard (Austria) Nicole Rottmann	(United Kingdom) Nicola George (Austria) Nicole Rottmann	(Austria) Jeannine Prentner (Italy) Lara Rafful (United Kingdom) Jennifer Allan (Russia) Julia Samuseva
May 16	Moscow, Russia; Clay $25,000; Singles draw – Doubles draw	(Russia) Yulia Putintseva; 6–2, 6–1	(Ukraine) Veronika Kapshay	(Russia) Nadejda Guskova (Ukraine) Elizaveta Ianchuk	(Serbia) Aleksandra Krunić (Slovenia) Tadeja Majerič (Poland) Justyna Jegiołka (Slovakia) Zuzana Luknárová
May 16	Moscow, Russia; Clay $25,000; Singles draw – Doubles draw	(Russia) Nadejda Guskova (Russia) Valeria Solovyeva; 6–3, 7–6^{(7–2)}	(Poland) Justyna Jegiołka (Ukraine) Veronika Kapshay	(Russia) Nadejda Guskova (Ukraine) Elizaveta Ianchuk	(Serbia) Aleksandra Krunić (Slovenia) Tadeja Majerič (Poland) Justyna Jegiołka (Slovakia) Zuzana Luknárová
May 16	Karuizawa, Nagano, Japan; Carpet $25,000; Singles draw – Doubles draw	(Japan) Misa Eguchi; 6–3, 6–3	(Japan) Rika Fujiwara	(China) Wang Qiang (Japan) Natsumi Hamamura	(Australia) Monique Adamczak (Russia) Ksenia Lykina (Russia) Olga Puchkova (Japan) Miyabi Inoue
May 16	Karuizawa, Nagano, Japan; Carpet $25,000; Singles draw – Doubles draw	(Japan) Shuko Aoyama (Japan) Rika Fujiwara; 6–4, 6–4	(Japan) Natsumi Hamamura (Japan) Ayumi Oka	(China) Wang Qiang (Japan) Natsumi Hamamura	(Australia) Monique Adamczak (Russia) Ksenia Lykina (Russia) Olga Puchkova (Japan) Miyabi Inoue
May 16	Rethymno, Greece; Hard $10,000; Singles draw – Doubles draw	(Russia) Alexandra Artamonova; 6–2, 6–4	(United Kingdom) Samantha Murray	(Russia) Diana Arutyunova (Mexico) Carolina Betancourt	(United Kingdom) Anna Fitzpatrick (Switzerland) Lisa Sabino (Israel) Ofri Lankri (Latvia) Diāna Marcinkēviča
May 16	Rethymno, Greece; Hard $10,000; Singles draw – Doubles draw	(Russia) Alexandra Artamonova (Latvia) Diāna Marcinkēviča; 6–2, 6–3	(United Kingdom) Anna Fitzpatrick (United Kingdom) Jade Windley	(Russia) Diana Arutyunova (Mexico) Carolina Betancourt	(United Kingdom) Anna Fitzpatrick (Switzerland) Lisa Sabino (Israel) Ofri Lankri (Latvia) Diāna Marcinkēviča
May 16	Itaparica Island, Brazil; Hard $10,000; Singles draw – Doubles draw	(Argentina) Andrea Benítez; 6–2, 6–3	(Argentina) Vanesa Furlanetto	(Brazil) Vivian Segnini (United Kingdom) Amanda Carreras	(Brazil) Carla Forte (Chile) Daniela Seguel (Brazil) Monique Albuquerque (Brazil) Nathalia Rossi
May 16	Itaparica Island, Brazil; Hard $10,000; Singles draw – Doubles draw	(Chile) Cecilia Costa Melgar (Brazil) Flávia Guimarães Bueno; 6–3, 3–6, [10–8]	(Paraguay) Isabella Robbiani (Argentina) Luciana Sarmenti	(Brazil) Vivian Segnini (United Kingdom) Amanda Carreras	(Brazil) Carla Forte (Chile) Daniela Seguel (Brazil) Monique Albuquerque (Brazil) Nathalia Rossi
May 23	Carson, California, United States; Hard $50,000; Singles draw – Doubles draw	(Italy) Camila Giorgi; 7–6^{(7–4)}, 6–1	(United States) Alexa Glatch	(United States) Ashley Weinhold (United States) Taylor Townsend	(United States) Jessica Pegula (Serbia) Teodora Mirčić (United States) Yasmin Schnack (United States) Chiara Scholl
May 23	Carson, California, United States; Hard $50,000; Singles draw – Doubles draw	(United States) Alexandra Mueller (United States) Asia Muhammad; 6–2, 6–3	(United States) Christina Fusano (United States) Yasmin Schnack	(United States) Ashley Weinhold (United States) Taylor Townsend	(United States) Jessica Pegula (Serbia) Teodora Mirčić (United States) Yasmin Schnack (United States) Chiara Scholl
May 23	Changwon, South Korea; Hard $25,000; Singles draw – Doubles draw	(South Africa) Chanel Simmonds; 6–2, 6–2	(Japan) Yurika Sema	(Bolivia) María Fernanda Álvarez Terán (Japan) Erika Takao	(South Korea) Jang Su-jeong (South Korea) Han Sung-hee (Ukraine) Tetyana Arefyeva (South Korea) Hong Seung-yeon
May 23	Changwon, South Korea; Hard $25,000; Singles draw – Doubles draw	(Chinese Taipei) Chan Hao-ching (China) Zheng Saisai; 6–2, 4–6, [11–9]	(Japan) Yurika Sema (Japan) Erika Takao	(Bolivia) María Fernanda Álvarez Terán (Japan) Erika Takao	(South Korea) Jang Su-jeong (South Korea) Han Sung-hee (Ukraine) Tetyana Arefyeva (South Korea) Hong Seung-yeon
May 23	2011 Torneo Internazionale Femminile Città di Grado; Grado, Italy; Clay $25,000; Singles draw – Doubles draw	(Croatia) Ajla Tomljanović; 6–2, 6–4	(Romania) Alexandra Cadanțu	(Russia) Nina Bratchikova (Australia) Olivia Rogowska	(Austria) Yvonne Meusburger (Bulgaria) Elitsa Kostova (Russia) Ekaterina Ivanova (Slovakia) Lenka Juríková
May 23	2011 Torneo Internazionale Femminile Città di Grado; Grado, Italy; Clay $25,000; Singles draw – Doubles draw	(Argentina) María Irigoyen (Russia) Ekaterina Ivanova; 6–3, 6–0	(China) Liu Wanting (China) Sun Shengnan	(Russia) Nina Bratchikova (Australia) Olivia Rogowska	(Austria) Yvonne Meusburger (Bulgaria) Elitsa Kostova (Russia) Ekaterina Ivanova (Slovakia) Lenka Juríková
May 23	Gaziantep, Turkey; Hard $10,000; Singles draw – Doubles draw	(Turkey) Melis Sezer; 6–2, 6–1	(Bulgaria) Huliya Velieva	(Australia) Daniella Dominikovic (Armenia) Ani Amiraghyan	(Cyprus) Joanna-Nena Savva (Russia) Evgeniya Svintsova (Turkey) Başak Eraydın (Bulgaria) Isabella Shinikova
May 23	Gaziantep, Turkey; Hard $10,000; Singles draw – Doubles draw	(Armenia) Ani Amiraghyan (Turkey) Başak Eraydın; 6–2, 6–3	(Australia) Daniella Dominikovic (Turkey) Melis Sezer	(Australia) Daniella Dominikovic (Armenia) Ani Amiraghyan	(Cyprus) Joanna-Nena Savva (Russia) Evgeniya Svintsova (Turkey) Başak Eraydın (Bulgaria) Isabella Shinikova
May 23	Velenje, Slovenia; Clay $10,000; Singles draw – Doubles draw	(Germany) Scarlett Werner; 6–2, 6–2	(Croatia) Silvia Njirić	(Bulgaria) Dia Evtimova (Slovakia) Karin Morgošová	(Czech Republic) Martina Borecká (Italy) Carolina Pillot (Spain) Isabel Rapisarda Calvo (Serbia) Milana Špremo
May 23	Velenje, Slovenia; Clay $10,000; Singles draw – Doubles draw	(Croatia) Maria Abramović (Germany) Scarlett Werner; 6–4, 6–4	(Germany) Dejana Raickovic (Bulgaria) Dalia Zafirova	(Bulgaria) Dia Evtimova (Slovakia) Karin Morgošová	(Czech Republic) Martina Borecká (Italy) Carolina Pillot (Spain) Isabel Rapisarda Calvo (Serbia) Milana Špremo
May 23	Bucharest, Romania; Clay $10,000; Singles draw – Doubles draw	(Romania) Elora Dabija; 6–4, 6–2	(Romania) Laura-Ioana Andrei	(Romania) Sabina Lupu (Germany) Julia Kimmelmann	(Italy) Andreea Văideanu (Russia) Polina Vinogradova (Romania) Camelia Hristea (Romania) Bianca Hîncu
May 23	Bucharest, Romania; Clay $10,000; Singles draw – Doubles draw	(Romania) Laura-Ioana Andrei (Romania) Camelia Hristea; 7–6^{(7–5)}, 6–1	(Finland) Cecilia Estlander (Austria) Katharina Negrin	(Romania) Sabina Lupu (Germany) Julia Kimmelmann	(Italy) Andreea Văideanu (Russia) Polina Vinogradova (Romania) Camelia Hristea (Romania) Bianca Hîncu
May 23	Getxo, Spain; Clay $10,000; Singles draw – Doubles draw	(Ukraine) Yevgeniya Kryvoruchko; 7–6^{(9–7)}, 3–6, 7–6^{(7–5)}	(France) Elixane Lechemia	(Spain) Eva Fernández Brugués (Spain) Sandra Soler-Sola	(Spain) Yvonne Cavallé Reimers (Spain) Arabela Fernández Rabener (Germany) Karolina Nowak (Estonia) Margit Rüütel
May 23	Getxo, Spain; Clay $10,000; Singles draw – Doubles draw	(Spain) Eva Fernández Brugués (Spain) Arabela Fernández Rabener; 7–5, 6–1	(Russia) Margarita Lazareva (Spain) Sheila Solsona Carcasona	(Spain) Eva Fernández Brugués (Spain) Sandra Soler-Sola	(Spain) Yvonne Cavallé Reimers (Spain) Arabela Fernández Rabener (Germany) Karolina Nowak (Estonia) Margit Rüütel
May 23	Sumter, South Carolina, United States; Hard $10,000; Singles draw – Doubles draw	(United States) Alexis King; 6–3, 7–5	(United States) Brooke Austin	(United States) Hayley Carter (Australia) Bojana Bobusic	(Russia) Nika Kukharchuk (United States) Whitney Jones (United States) Kyle McPhillips (United Kingdom) Nicola Slater
May 23	Sumter, South Carolina, United States; Hard $10,000; Singles draw – Doubles draw	(Australia) Bojana Bobusic (United Kingdom) Nicola Slater; 4–6, 7–5, [10–6]	(Australia) Ebony Panoho (Australia) Storm Sanders	(United States) Hayley Carter (Australia) Bojana Bobusic	(Russia) Nika Kukharchuk (United States) Whitney Jones (United States) Kyle McPhillips (United Kingdom) Nicola Slater
May 23	Durban, South Africa; Hard $10,000; Singles draw – Doubles draw	(Austria) Nicole Rottmann; 6–7^{(4–7)}, 7–5, 6–1	(Czech Republic) Kateřina Kramperová	(Czech Republic) Zuzana Linhová (South Africa) Surina de Beer	(United Kingdom) Jennifer Allan (Denmark) Malou Ejdesgaard (South Africa) Tegan Edwards (South Africa) Natasha Fourouclas
May 23	Durban, South Africa; Hard $10,000; Singles draw – Doubles draw	(Czech Republic) Kateřina Kramperová (Czech Republic) Zuzana Linhová; 6–3, 3–6, [10–8]	(Denmark) Malou Ejdesgaard (Austria) Nicole Rottmann	(Czech Republic) Zuzana Linhová (South Africa) Surina de Beer	(United Kingdom) Jennifer Allan (Denmark) Malou Ejdesgaard (South Africa) Tegan Edwards (South Africa) Natasha Fourouclas
May 23	Bangkok, Thailand; Hard $25,000; Singles draw – Doubles draw	(Indonesia) Ayu-Fani Damayanti; 3–6, 6–2, 6–3	(United States) Julia Cohen	(Thailand) Peangtarn Plipuech (Russia) Marta Sirotkina	(Poland) Sandra Zaniewska (Austria) Melanie Klaffner (China) Lu Jia Xiang (Thailand) Varatchaya Wongteanchai
May 23	Bangkok, Thailand; Hard $25,000; Singles draw – Doubles draw	(China) Li Ting (Thailand) Varatchaya Wongteanchai; 6–1, 6–4	(Indonesia) Ayu-Fani Damayanti (Indonesia) Lavinia Tananta	(Thailand) Peangtarn Plipuech (Russia) Marta Sirotkina	(Poland) Sandra Zaniewska (Austria) Melanie Klaffner (China) Lu Jia Xiang (Thailand) Varatchaya Wongteanchai
May 23	Niigata, Japan; Hard $25,000; Singles draw – Doubles draw	(Japan) Erika Sema; 7–6^{(7–5)}, 6–4	(Japan) Sachie Ishizu	(Japan) Shiho Akita (China) Wang Qiang	(Japan) Misa Eguchi (Japan) Yuka Mori (Japan) Akiko Yonemura (Japan) Remi Tezuka
May 23	Niigata, Japan; Hard $25,000; Singles draw – Doubles draw	(Japan) Natsumi Hamamura (Japan) Erika Sema; 6–1, 6–2	(Japan) Akari Inoue (Japan) Ayumi Oka	(Japan) Shiho Akita (China) Wang Qiang	(Japan) Misa Eguchi (Japan) Yuka Mori (Japan) Akiko Yonemura (Japan) Remi Tezuka
May 23	Paros, Greece; Carpet $10,000; Singles draw – Doubles draw	(Denmark) Karen Barbat; 6–1, 7–5	(Greece) Despoina Vogasari	(Serbia) Tamara Čurović (Germany) Kim Grajdek	(United States) Samantha Powers (Ukraine) Anastasia Kharchenko (Republic of Ireland) Julia Moriarty (Ukraine) Yuliya Lysa
May 23	Paros, Greece; Carpet $10,000; Singles draw – Doubles draw	(Serbia) Tamara Čurović (Ukraine) Yuliya Lysa; 3–6, 6–0, [11–9]	(Germany) Kim Grajdek (Ukraine) Anastasia Kharchenko	(Serbia) Tamara Čurović (Germany) Kim Grajdek	(United States) Samantha Powers (Ukraine) Anastasia Kharchenko (Republic of Ireland) Julia Moriarty (Ukraine) Yuliya Lysa
May 23	Ra'anana, Israel; Hard $10,000; Singles draw – Doubles draw	(Israel) Valeria Patiuk; 6–4, 2–6, 6–1	(Israel) Keren Shlomo	(Switzerland) Clelia Melena (United Kingdom) Manisha Foster	(Russia) Julia Valetova (Italy) Stephanie Scimone (Israel) Rona Lavian (United Kingdom) Yasmin Clarke
May 23	Ra'anana, Israel; Hard $10,000; Singles draw – Doubles draw	(Israel) Ofri Lankri (Israel) Valeria Patiuk; 6–2, 6–1	(Israel) Lee Or (Israel) Margarita-Greta Skripnik	(Switzerland) Clelia Melena (United Kingdom) Manisha Foster	(Russia) Julia Valetova (Italy) Stephanie Scimone (Israel) Rona Lavian (United Kingdom) Yasmin Clarke
May 23	Itaparica Island, Brazil; Hard $25,000; Singles draw – Doubles draw	(Brazil) Roxane Vaisemberg; 6–0, 6–1	(Brazil) Vivian Segnini	(Brazil) Nathalia Rossi (Argentina) Aranza Salut	(Brazil) Ana Clara Duarte (Argentina) Andrea Benítez (Paraguay) Verónica Cepede Royg (Argentina) Vanesa Furlanetto
May 23	Itaparica Island, Brazil; Hard $25,000; Singles draw – Doubles draw	(Brazil) Monique Albuquerque (Argentina) Aranza Salut; 6–3, 4–6, [11–9]	(Brazil) Vivian Segnini (Brazil) Roxane Vaisemberg	(Brazil) Nathalia Rossi (Argentina) Aranza Salut	(Brazil) Ana Clara Duarte (Argentina) Andrea Benítez (Paraguay) Verónica Cepede Royg (Argentina) Vanesa Furlanetto
May 23	Jakarta, Indonesia; Hard $10,000; Singles draw – Doubles draw	(China) Zhu Lin; 7–6^{(7–4)}, 6–3	(Mexico) Nadia Abdala	(Indonesia) Jessy Rompies (Chinese Taipei) Juan Ting-fei	(China) Yang Zi (China) Deng Meng Ning (China) Ou Xuanshuo (Indonesia) Sandy Gumulya
May 23	Jakarta, Indonesia; Hard $10,000; Singles draw – Doubles draw	(China) Zhang Kailin (China) Zheng Jun-yi; 6–2, 6–4	(Indonesia) Bella Destriana (Indonesia) Nadya Syarifah	(Indonesia) Jessy Rompies (Chinese Taipei) Juan Ting-fei	(China) Yang Zi (China) Deng Meng Ning (China) Ou Xuanshuo (Indonesia) Sandy Gumulya
May 30	2011 Aegon Trophy; Nottingham, United Kingdom; Grass $75,000+H; Singles – Doubles	(Greece) Eleni Daniilidou; 1–6, 6–4, 6–2	(Belarus) Olga Govortsova	(Portugal) Michelle Larcher de Brito (United States) Alison Riske	(France) Stéphanie Foretz Gacon (United States) Sloane Stephens (Austria) Tamira Paszek (Italy) Romina Oprandi
May 30	2011 Aegon Trophy; Nottingham, United Kingdom; Grass $75,000+H; Singles – Doubles	(Japan) Kimiko Date-Krumm (China) Zhang Shuai; 6–4, 7–6^{(9–7)}	(United States) Raquel Kops-Jones (United States) Abigail Spears	(Portugal) Michelle Larcher de Brito (United States) Alison Riske	(France) Stéphanie Foretz Gacon (United States) Sloane Stephens (Austria) Tamira Paszek (Italy) Romina Oprandi
May 30	Infond Open; Maribor, Slovenia; Clay $25,000; Singles and doubles draws	(Slovenia) Nastja Kolar; 7–5, 6–4	(Slovenia) Maša Zec Peškirič	(Italy) Annalisa Bona (Bulgaria) Dia Evtimova	(Argentina) María Irigoyen (Croatia) Ani Mijačika (Brazil) Teliana Pereira (Croatia) Ana Vrljić
May 30	Infond Open; Maribor, Slovenia; Clay $25,000; Singles and doubles draws	(Colombia) Karen Castiblanco (Venezuela) Adriana Pérez; 6–3, 7–6^{(11–9)}	(Croatia) Ani Mijačika (Croatia) Ana Vrljić	(Italy) Annalisa Bona (Bulgaria) Dia Evtimova	(Argentina) María Irigoyen (Croatia) Ani Mijačika (Brazil) Teliana Pereira (Croatia) Ana Vrljić
May 30	Gimcheon, South Korea; Hard $25,000; Singles draw – Doubles draw	(South Korea) Yoo Mi; 6–3, 3–6, 6–1	(Japan) Yurika Sema	(South Korea) Hong Hyun-hui (Bolivia) María Fernanda Álvarez Terán	(China) Duan Yingying (South Korea) Kim So-jung (Ukraine) Tetyana Arefyeva (South Korea) Han Sung-hee
May 30	Gimcheon, South Korea; Hard $25,000; Singles draw – Doubles draw	(Chinese Taipei) Chan Hao-ching (Japan) Remi Tezuka; 7–5, 6–4	(South Korea) Kim Ji-young (South Korea) Yoo Mi	(South Korea) Hong Hyun-hui (Bolivia) María Fernanda Álvarez Terán	(China) Duan Yingying (South Korea) Kim So-jung (Ukraine) Tetyana Arefyeva (South Korea) Han Sung-hee
May 30	2011 Zubr Cup; Přerov, Czech Republic; Clay $25,000; Singles – Doubles	(Hungary) Réka-Luca Jani; 6–0, 6–3	(Czech Republic) Karolína Plíšková	(Slovakia) Zuzana Luknárová (Ukraine) Elina Svitolina	(Germany) Sarah-Rebecca Sekulic (Czech Republic) Martina Kubičíková (Slovakia) Lenka Wienerová (Czech Republic) Renata Voráčová
May 30	2011 Zubr Cup; Přerov, Czech Republic; Clay $25,000; Singles – Doubles	(Czech Republic) Kateřina Kramperová (Czech Republic) Karolína Plíšková; 6–3, 6–4	(Ukraine) Lyudmyla Kichenok (Ukraine) Nadiia Kichenok	(Slovakia) Zuzana Luknárová (Ukraine) Elina Svitolina	(Germany) Sarah-Rebecca Sekulic (Czech Republic) Martina Kubičíková (Slovakia) Lenka Wienerová (Czech Republic) Renata Voráčová
May 30	Cantanhede, Portugal; Carpet $10,000; Singles draw – Doubles draw	(Portugal) Magali de Lattre; 6–2, 6–4	(Venezuela) Andrea Gámiz	(France) Constance Sibille (Mexico) Ximena Hermoso	(Poland) Sylwia Zagórska (United States) Danielle Mills (Portugal) Rita Vilaça (Norway) Emma Flood
May 30	Cantanhede, Portugal; Carpet $10,000; Singles draw – Doubles draw	(United States) Danielle Mills (United States) Kayla Rizzolo; 7–5, 6–1	(Poland) Natalia Siedliska (Poland) Sylwia Zagórska	(France) Constance Sibille (Mexico) Ximena Hermoso	(Poland) Sylwia Zagórska (United States) Danielle Mills (Portugal) Rita Vilaça (Norway) Emma Flood
May 30	Hilton Head Island, South Carolina, United States; Hard $10,000; Singles draw – Doubles draw	(United States) Alexandra Mueller; 6–2, 6–0	(Australia) Bojana Bobusic	(United States) Jan Abaza (New Zealand) Dianne Hollands	(United States) Amanda McDowell (Venezuela) Marina Giral Lores (United States) Macall Harkins (Russia) Angelina Gabueva
May 30	Hilton Head Island, South Carolina, United States; Hard $10,000; Singles draw – Doubles draw	(United States) Macall Harkins (United States) Amanda McDowell; 6–3, 6–3	(United States) Whitney Jones (United States) Alexandra Mueller	(United States) Jan Abaza (New Zealand) Dianne Hollands	(United States) Amanda McDowell (Venezuela) Marina Giral Lores (United States) Macall Harkins (Russia) Angelina Gabueva
May 30	Madrid, Spain; Hard $10,000; Singles draw – Doubles draw	(Spain) Lucía Cervera Vázquez; 6–4, 7–5	(Switzerland) Xenia Knoll	(Spain) Arabela Fernández Rabener (Germany) Julia Kimmelmann	(Spain) Yvonne Cavallé Reimers (Spain) Alejandra Starkova (Spain) Carmen López Rueda (Russia) Diana Arutyunova
May 30	Madrid, Spain; Hard $10,000; Singles draw – Doubles draw	(Spain) Rocío de la Torre Sánchez (Spain) Olga Sáez Larra; 6–4, 4–6, [10–8]	(Bulgaria) Isabella Shinikova (Bulgaria) Julia Stamatova	(Spain) Arabela Fernández Rabener (Germany) Julia Kimmelmann	(Spain) Yvonne Cavallé Reimers (Spain) Alejandra Starkova (Spain) Carmen López Rueda (Russia) Diana Arutyunova
May 30	Bangkok, Thailand; Hard $25,000; Singles draw – Doubles draw	(Russia) Marta Sirotkina; 6–4, 6–3	(Thailand) Luksika Kumkhum	(Belgium) Tamaryn Hendler (Finland) Piia Suomalainen	(Thailand) Varatchaya Wongteanchai (Indonesia) Lavinia Tananta (China) Li Ting (Thailand) Nicha Lertpitaksinchai
May 30	Bangkok, Thailand; Hard $25,000; Singles draw – Doubles draw	(China) Li Ting (Thailand) Varatchaya Wongteanchai; 5–7, 7–6^{(7–5)}, [10–5]	(Indonesia) Ayu-Fani Damayanti (Indonesia) Lavinia Tananta	(Belgium) Tamaryn Hendler (Finland) Piia Suomalainen	(Thailand) Varatchaya Wongteanchai (Indonesia) Lavinia Tananta (China) Li Ting (Thailand) Nicha Lertpitaksinchai
May 30	Mie, Japan; Carpet $10,000; Singles draw – Doubles draw	(Japan) Miharu Imanishi; 6–4, 6–3	(Japan) Riko Sawayanagi	(Japan) Kazusa Ito (Japan) Yumi Miyazaki	(Japan) Yuka Higuchi (Japan) Chihiro Takayama (Japan) Mana Ayukawa (Japan) Yuuki Tanaka
May 30	Mie, Japan; Carpet $10,000; Singles draw – Doubles draw	(Japan) Shiori Araki (Japan) Risa Hasegawa; 6–3, 7–6^{(7–3)}	(Japan) Riko Sawayanagi (Japan) Chihiro Takayama	(Japan) Kazusa Ito (Japan) Yumi Miyazaki	(Japan) Yuka Higuchi (Japan) Chihiro Takayama (Japan) Mana Ayukawa (Japan) Yuuki Tanaka
May 30	2011 Torneo Internazionale Femminile Antico Tiro a Volo; Rome – Tiro A Volo, Italy; Clay $50,000; Singles – Doubles	(United States) Christina McHale; 6–2, 6–4	(Russia) Ekaterina Ivanova	(Romania) Liana Ungur (Russia) Nina Bratchikova	(Spain) Leticia Costas (Ukraine) Tetiana Luzhanska (France) Iryna Brémond (Japan) Kurumi Nara
May 30	2011 Torneo Internazionale Femminile Antico Tiro a Volo; Rome – Tiro A Volo, Italy; Clay $50,000; Singles – Doubles	(Australia) Sophie Ferguson (Australia) Sally Peers w/o	(Poland) Magda Linette (Romania) Liana Ungur	(Romania) Liana Ungur (Russia) Nina Bratchikova	(Spain) Leticia Costas (Ukraine) Tetiana Luzhanska (France) Iryna Brémond (Japan) Kurumi Nara
May 30	Florence, Clay; Hard $10,000; Singles draw – Doubles draw	(Italy) Anastasia Grymalska; 6–0, 4–6, 6–1	(France) Elixane Lechemia	(Italy) Carolina Pillot (Italy) Benedetta Davato	(Romania) Mihaela Buzărnescu (Italy) Alice Balducci (Italy) Alice Savoretti (Slovakia) Zuzana Zlochová
May 30	Florence, Clay; Hard $10,000; Singles draw – Doubles draw	(Romania) Mihaela Buzărnescu (Slovakia) Zuzana Zlochová; 6–3, 6–4	(Italy) Nicole Clerico (Italy) Valentina Sulpizio	(Italy) Carolina Pillot (Italy) Benedetta Davato	(Romania) Mihaela Buzărnescu (Italy) Alice Balducci (Italy) Alice Savoretti (Slovakia) Zuzana Zlochová
May 30	Paros, Greece; Carpet $10,000; Singles draw – Doubles draw	(Serbia) Tamara Čurović; 6–4, 6–1	(Ukraine) Yuliya Lysa	(Russia) Alexandra Romanova (Spain) Nuria Párrizas Díaz	(Greece) Maria Sakkari (Greece) Stamatia Fafaliou (Greece) Angeliki Kairi (Ukraine) Anastasia Kharchenko
May 30	Paros, Greece; Carpet $10,000; Singles draw – Doubles draw	(Serbia) Tamara Čurović (Ukraine) Yuliya Lysa; 6–4, 7–5	(Australia) Anneliese Tepper (Australia) Bianca Tepper	(Russia) Alexandra Romanova (Spain) Nuria Párrizas Díaz	(Greece) Maria Sakkari (Greece) Stamatia Fafaliou (Greece) Angeliki Kairi (Ukraine) Anastasia Kharchenko
May 30	Surabaya, Indonesia; Hard $10,000; Singles draw – Doubles draw	(Indonesia) Sandy Gumulya; 6–1, 1–6, 6–1	(Indonesia) Jessy Rompies	(China) Zhang Kailin (China) Zhu Lin	(China) Ou Xuanshuo (China) Zhu Ai Wen (China) Yang Zi (Mexico) Nadia Abdala
May 30	Surabaya, Indonesia; Hard $10,000; Singles draw – Doubles draw	(Indonesia) Jessy Rompies (Indonesia) Grace Sari Ysidora; 6–3, 6–4	(Indonesia) Sandy Gumulya (Indonesia) Cynthia Melita	(China) Zhang Kailin (China) Zhu Lin	(China) Ou Xuanshuo (China) Zhu Ai Wen (China) Yang Zi (Mexico) Nadia Abdala

== June ==
Week of	Tournament	Winner	Runners-up	Semifinalists	Quarterfinalists
June 6	2011 Open GDF Suez de Marseille; Marseille, France; Clay $100,000; Singles – Doubles	(France) Pauline Parmentier; 6–3, 6–2	(Romania) Irina-Camelia Begu	(Russia) Anastasia Pivovarova (Belarus) Anastasiya Yakimova	(Croatia) Dijana Banoveć (Spain) Carla Suárez Navarro (Australia) Sophie Ferguson (Italy) Corinna Dentoni
June 6	2011 Open GDF Suez de Marseille; Marseille, France; Clay $100,000; Singles – Doubles	(Romania) Irina-Camelia Begu (Russia) Nina Bratchikova; 6–2, 6–2	(Romania) Laura-Ioana Andrei (Romania) Mădălina Gojnea	(Russia) Anastasia Pivovarova (Belarus) Anastasiya Yakimova	(Croatia) Dijana Banoveć (Spain) Carla Suárez Navarro (Australia) Sophie Ferguson (Italy) Corinna Dentoni
June 6	2011 Aegon Nottingham Challenge; Nottingham, United Kingdom; Grass $100,000+H; Singles – Doubles	(United Kingdom) Elena Baltacha; 7–5, 6–3	(Czech Republic) Petra Cetkovská	(Thailand) Tamarine Tanasugarn (Canada) Stéphanie Dubois	(Romania) Monica Niculescu (France) Mathilde Johansson (Russia) Evgeniya Rodina (Czech Republic) Lucie Hradecká
June 6	2011 Aegon Nottingham Challenge; Nottingham, United Kingdom; Grass $100,000+H; Singles – Doubles	(Czech Republic) Eva Birnerová (Czech Republic) Petra Cetkovská; 6–3, 6–2	(Russia) Regina Kulikova (Russia) Evgeniya Rodina	(Thailand) Tamarine Tanasugarn (Canada) Stéphanie Dubois	(Romania) Monica Niculescu (France) Mathilde Johansson (Russia) Evgeniya Rodina (Czech Republic) Lucie Hradecká
June 6	2011 Smart Card Open Monet+ Zlín, Czech Republic; Clay $50,000+H; Singles – Doubles	(Austria) Patricia Mayr-Achleitner; 6–1, 6–0	(Russia) Ksenia Pervak	(Ukraine) Yuliya Beygelzimer (Germany) Anna-Lena Grönefeld	(Slovakia) Lenka Wienerová (Romania) Alexandra Cadanțu (Slovakia) Zuzana Luknárová (Canada) Heidi El Tabakh
June 6	2011 Smart Card Open Monet+ Zlín, Czech Republic; Clay $50,000+H; Singles – Doubles	(Ukraine) Yuliya Beygelzimer (Georgia (country)) Margalita Chakhnashvili; 3–6, 6–1, [10–8]	(Hungary) Réka-Luca Jani (Hungary) Katalin Marosi	(Ukraine) Yuliya Beygelzimer (Germany) Anna-Lena Grönefeld	(Slovakia) Lenka Wienerová (Romania) Alexandra Cadanțu (Slovakia) Zuzana Luknárová (Canada) Heidi El Tabakh
June 6	2011 Internazionali Regione Molise; Campobasso, Italy; Clay $25,000; Singles – Doubles	(Italy) Karin Knapp; 6–2, 6–4	(France) Alizé Lim	(Croatia) Ani Mijačika (Chile) Andrea Koch Benvenuto	(Argentina) María Irigoyen (Italy) Federica Di Sarra (Bulgaria) Martina Gledacheva (Italy) Alice Balducci
June 6	2011 Internazionali Regione Molise; Campobasso, Italy; Clay $25,000; Singles – Doubles	(Argentina) Mailen Auroux (Argentina) María Irigoyen; 6–2, 3–6, [13–11]	(Croatia) Ani Mijačika (France) Irena Pavlovic	(Croatia) Ani Mijačika (Chile) Andrea Koch Benvenuto	(Argentina) María Irigoyen (Italy) Federica Di Sarra (Bulgaria) Martina Gledacheva (Italy) Alice Balducci
June 6	2011 Hunt Communities USTA Women's Pro Tennis Classic; El Paso, Texas, United States; Hard $25,000; Singles – Doubles	(United States) Chichi Scholl; 7–5, 7–5	(Slovenia) Petra Rampre	(Ukraine) Alyona Sotnikova (United States) Ashley Weinhold	(Canada) Marie-Ève Pelletier (Bolivia) María Fernanda Álvarez Terán (United States) Amanda Fink (United States) Alexandra Mueller
June 6	2011 Hunt Communities USTA Women's Pro Tennis Classic; El Paso, Texas, United States; Hard $25,000; Singles – Doubles	(United States) Chichi Scholl (Ukraine) Alyona Sotnikova; 7–5, 4–6, [10–8]	(United States) Amanda Fink (United States) Yasmin Schnack	(Ukraine) Alyona Sotnikova (United States) Ashley Weinhold	(Canada) Marie-Ève Pelletier (Bolivia) María Fernanda Álvarez Terán (United States) Amanda Fink (United States) Alexandra Mueller
June 6	Tokyo, Japan; Hard $10,000; Singles draw – Doubles draw	(Japan) Akiko Omae; 6–3, 6–4	(Japan) Misa Eguchi	(Japan) Yurina Koshino (Japan) Mari Tanaka	(Japan) Yuki Ito (Japan) Ayumi Oka (Japan) Maya Kato (Japan) Akari Inoue
June 6	Tokyo, Japan; Hard $10,000; Singles draw – Doubles draw	(Japan) Yuka Higuchi (Japan) Hirono Watanabe; 6–2, 6–3	(Japan) Miyabi Inoue (Japan) Sakiko Shimizu	(Japan) Yurina Koshino (Japan) Mari Tanaka	(Japan) Yuki Ito (Japan) Ayumi Oka (Japan) Maya Kato (Japan) Akari Inoue
June 6	Taipei, Chinese Taipei; Hard $10,000; Singles draw – Doubles draw	(Chinese Taipei) Juan Ting-fei; 6–4, 7–6^{(7–1)}	(Chinese Taipei) Lee Ya-hsuan	(Japan) Yumi Miyazaki (Chinese Taipei) Hsieh Shu-ying	(Chinese Taipei) Lee Hua-chen (South Korea) Kang Seo-kyung (Japan) Tomoko Sugano (China) Yang Zi
June 6	Taipei, Chinese Taipei; Hard $10,000; Singles draw – Doubles draw	(Chinese Taipei) Chan Chin-wei (Chinese Taipei) Kao Shao-yuan; 6–3, 6–2	(Chinese Taipei) Tsao Fang-chi (Chinese Taipei) Yang Chia Hsien	(Japan) Yumi Miyazaki (Chinese Taipei) Hsieh Shu-ying	(Chinese Taipei) Lee Hua-chen (South Korea) Kang Seo-kyung (Japan) Tomoko Sugano (China) Yang Zi
June 6	Amarante, Portugal; Hard $10,000; Singles draw – Doubles draw	(Portugal) Magali de Lattre; 6–1, 6–1	(Portugal) Bárbara Luz	(Poland) Natalia Siedliska (Poland) Sylwia Zagórska	(United Kingdom) Yasmin Clarke (Spain) Nuria Párrizas Díaz (France) Constance Sibille (Republic of Ireland) Amy Bowtell
June 6	Amarante, Portugal; Hard $10,000; Singles draw – Doubles draw	(Republic of Ireland) Amy Bowtell (United Kingdom) Yasmin Clarke; 6–2, 6–3	(Austria) Katharina Negrin (France) Constance Sibille	(Poland) Natalia Siedliska (Poland) Sylwia Zagórska	(United Kingdom) Yasmin Clarke (Spain) Nuria Párrizas Díaz (France) Constance Sibille (Republic of Ireland) Amy Bowtell
June 6	Madrid, Spain; Clay $10,000; Singles draw – Doubles draw	(Switzerland) Lisa Sabino; 7–5, 6–3	(Bulgaria) Isabella Shinikova	(Spain) Lucía Cervera Vázquez (Spain) Rocío de la Torre-Sánchez	(Spain) Arabela Fernández Rabener (Spain) Sandra Soler-Sola (Spain) Carmen López-Rueda (Italy) Andreea Văideanu
June 6	Madrid, Spain; Clay $10,000; Singles draw – Doubles draw	(Switzerland) Lisa Sabino (Italy) Andreea Văideanu; 6–4, 6–1	(Italy) Benedetta Davato (Switzerland) Xenia Knoll	(Spain) Lucía Cervera Vázquez (Spain) Rocío de la Torre-Sánchez	(Spain) Arabela Fernández Rabener (Spain) Sandra Soler-Sola (Spain) Carmen López-Rueda (Italy) Andreea Văideanu
June 6	Almere, Netherlands; Clay $10,000; Singles draw – Doubles draw	(Poland) Anna Korzeniak; 6–2, 7–5	(Sweden) Hilda Melander	(Estonia) Anett Kontaveit (Germany) Vanessa Henke	(Netherlands) Nicolette van Uitert (Netherlands) Eva Wacanno (Germany) Nina Zander (Germany) Karolina Nowak
June 6	Almere, Netherlands; Clay $10,000; Singles draw – Doubles draw	(Netherlands) Lynn Schönhage (Netherlands) Ghislaine van Baal; 6–2, 6–4	(Germany) Sabrina Baumgarten (Netherlands) Valeria Podda	(Estonia) Anett Kontaveit (Germany) Vanessa Henke	(Netherlands) Nicolette van Uitert (Netherlands) Eva Wacanno (Germany) Nina Zander (Germany) Karolina Nowak
June 6	Santos, São Paulo, Brazil; Clay $10,000; Singles draw – Doubles draw	(Argentina) Andrea Benítez; 6–0, 6–1	(Brazil) Carla Forte	(Brazil) Nathaly Kurata (Brazil) Monique Albuquerque	(Brazil) Fernanda Faria (Brazil) Gabriela Cé (Brazil) Eduarda Piai (Brazil) Natasha Lotuffo
June 6	Santos, São Paulo, Brazil; Clay $10,000; Singles draw – Doubles draw	(Brazil) Eduarda Piai (Brazil) Karina Souza; 6–4, 6–4	(Argentina) Andrea Benítez (Brazil) Raquel Piltcher	(Brazil) Nathaly Kurata (Brazil) Monique Albuquerque	(Brazil) Fernanda Faria (Brazil) Gabriela Cé (Brazil) Eduarda Piai (Brazil) Natasha Lotuffo
June 6	Jakarta, Indonesia; Hard $10,000; Singles draw – Doubles draw	(Indonesia) Ayu-Fani Damayanti; 6–4, 6–3	(China) Zhang Kailin	(China) Zhong Yi (Finland) Piia Suomalainen	(Indonesia) Grace Sari Ysidora (China) Yin Xianghong (China) Zhu Lin (China) Ou Xuanshuo
June 6	Jakarta, Indonesia; Hard $10,000; Singles draw – Doubles draw	(Indonesia) Ayu-Fani Damayanti (Indonesia) Lavinia Tananta; 7–5, 6–4	(Indonesia) Bella Destriana (Indonesia) Cynthia Melita	(China) Zhong Yi (Finland) Piia Suomalainen	(Indonesia) Grace Sari Ysidora (China) Yin Xianghong (China) Zhu Lin (China) Ou Xuanshuo
June 6	Nyíregyháza, Hungary; Clay $10,000; Singles draw – Doubles draw	(Czech Republic) Simona Dobrá; 6–4, 6–2	(Montenegro) Danka Kovinić	(Austria) Yvonne Neuwirth (Hungary) Vaszilisza Bulgakova	(Hungary) Zsófia Mikó (Romania) Sabina Lupu (Austria) Lisa Maria Reichmann (France) Gracia Radovanovic
June 6	Nyíregyháza, Hungary; Clay $10,000; Singles draw – Doubles draw	(Czech Republic) Simona Dobrá (Czech Republic) Monika Tůmová; 6–1, 3–6, [10–7]	(Hungary) Vaszilisza Bulgakova (Romania) Raluca Elena Platon	(Austria) Yvonne Neuwirth (Hungary) Vaszilisza Bulgakova	(Hungary) Zsófia Mikó (Romania) Sabina Lupu (Austria) Lisa Maria Reichmann (France) Gracia Radovanovic
June 6	Rosario, Santa Fe, Argentina; Clay $10,000; Singles draw – Doubles draw	(Argentina) Jorgelina Cravero; 4–6, 6–3, 6–4	(Argentina) Vanesa Furlanetto	(Argentina) Aranza Salut (Argentina) Luciana Sarmenti	(Peru) Katherine Miranda Chang (Mexico) Ana Sofia Sánchez (Argentina) Guadalupe Moreno (Venezuela) Gabriela Coglitore
June 6	Rosario, Santa Fe, Argentina; Clay $10,000; Singles draw – Doubles draw	(Argentina) Jorgelina Cravero (Argentina) Betina Jozami; 6–2, 7–6^{(7–4)}	(Argentina) Florencia di Biasi (Argentina) Vanesa Furlanetto	(Argentina) Aranza Salut (Argentina) Luciana Sarmenti	(Peru) Katherine Miranda Chang (Mexico) Ana Sofia Sánchez (Argentina) Guadalupe Moreno (Venezuela) Gabriela Coglitore
June 13	Astana, Kazakhstan; Hard $25,000; Singles draw – Doubles draw	(Hungary) Tímea Babos; 6–0, 6–2	(Slovenia) Tadeja Majerič	(Ukraine) Veronika Kapshay (Germany) Kim Grajdek	(Russia) Ekaterina Yashina (Russia) Alexandra Artamonova (Kazakhstan) Kamila Kerimbayeva (Kazakhstan) Anastasiya Yepisheva
June 13	Astana, Kazakhstan; Hard $25,000; Singles draw – Doubles draw	(Ukraine) Veronika Kapshay (Russia) Ekaterina Yashina; 2–6, 6–3, [15–13]	(Serbia) Tamara Čurović (Uzbekistan) Sabina Sharipova	(Ukraine) Veronika Kapshay (Germany) Kim Grajdek	(Russia) Ekaterina Yashina (Russia) Alexandra Artamonova (Kazakhstan) Kamila Kerimbayeva (Kazakhstan) Anastasiya Yepisheva
June 13	2011 Open GDF Suez Montpellier Agglomération Hérault; Montpellier, France; Clay $25,000; Singles – Doubles	(Netherlands) Bibiane Schoofs; 6–4, 6–4	(Spain) Leticia Costas-Moreira	(Germany) Sarah Gronert (France) Irena Pavlovic	(Italy) Annalisa Bona (France) Marion Gaud (Spain) Eva Fernández-Brugués (Spain) Inés Ferrer Suárez
June 13	2011 Open GDF Suez Montpellier Agglomération Hérault; Montpellier, France; Clay $25,000; Singles – Doubles	(Brazil) Paula Cristina Gonçalves (Ukraine) Maryna Zanevska; 6–4, 7–5	(Spain) Inés Ferrer Suárez (Romania) Mădălina Gojnea	(Germany) Sarah Gronert (France) Irena Pavlovic	(Italy) Annalisa Bona (France) Marion Gaud (Spain) Eva Fernández-Brugués (Spain) Inés Ferrer Suárez
June 13	2011 Enka Cup; Istanbul, Turkey; Hard $25,000; Singles – Doubles	(Poland) Marta Domachowska; 7–5, 6–3	(Georgia (country)) Margalita Chakhnashvili	(Bosnia and Herzegovina) Jasmina Tinjić (Bulgaria) Dia Evtimova	(Romania) Laura-Ioana Andrei (Romania) Cristina Dinu (Australia) Daniella Dominikovic (Turkey) Pemra Özgen
June 13	2011 Enka Cup; Istanbul, Turkey; Hard $25,000; Singles – Doubles	(Poland) Marta Domachowska (Serbia) Teodora Mirčić; 6–4, 6–2	(Australia) Daniella Dominikovic (Turkey) Melis Sezer	(Bosnia and Herzegovina) Jasmina Tinjić (Bulgaria) Dia Evtimova	(Romania) Laura-Ioana Andrei (Romania) Cristina Dinu (Australia) Daniella Dominikovic (Turkey) Pemra Özgen
June 13	Kharkiv, Ukraine; Clay $25,000; Singles draw – Doubles draw	(Lithuania) Lina Stančiūtė; 6–2, 6–1	(Georgia (country)) Sofia Shapatava	(Russia) Yana Buchina (Ukraine) Kateryna Kozlova	(Ukraine) Valentyna Ivakhnenko (Russia) Yuliya Kalabina (Ukraine) Olga Ianchuk (Austria) Melanie Klaffner
June 13	Kharkiv, Ukraine; Clay $25,000; Singles draw – Doubles draw	(Ukraine) Valentyna Ivakhnenko (Ukraine) Kateryna Kozlova; 6–4, 6–3	(Austria) Melanie Klaffner (Lithuania) Lina Stančiūtė	(Russia) Yana Buchina (Ukraine) Kateryna Kozlova	(Ukraine) Valentyna Ivakhnenko (Russia) Yuliya Kalabina (Ukraine) Olga Ianchuk (Austria) Melanie Klaffner
June 13	2011 Padova Challenge Open; Padova, Italy; Clay $25,000; Singles – Doubles	(France) Kristina Mladenovic; 3–6, 6–4, 6–0	(Italy) Karin Knapp	(Hungary) Réka-Luca Jani (Slovenia) Nastja Kolar	(Italy) Erika Zanchetta (Serbia) Milana Špremo (Italy) Agnese Zucchini (Germany) Scarlett Werner
June 13	2011 Padova Challenge Open; Padova, Italy; Clay $25,000; Singles – Doubles	(France) Kristina Mladenovic (Poland) Katarzyna Piter; 6–4, 6–3	(Ukraine) Irina Buryachok (Hungary) Réka-Luca Jani	(Hungary) Réka-Luca Jani (Slovenia) Nastja Kolar	(Italy) Erika Zanchetta (Serbia) Milana Špremo (Italy) Agnese Zucchini (Germany) Scarlett Werner
June 13	Taipei, Chinese Taipei; Hard $10,000; Singles draw – Doubles draw	(United States) Chieh-yu Hsu; 6–1, 6–4	(Chinese Taipei) Chan Chin-wei	(Chinese Taipei) Hsieh Shu-ying (Chinese Taipei) Juan Ting-fei	(South Korea) Kang Seo-kyung (Chinese Taipei) Lee Hua-chen (Chinese Taipei) Chen Yen-ling (Chinese Taipei) Tai Yu-lin
June 13	Taipei, Chinese Taipei; Hard $10,000; Singles draw – Doubles draw	(Chinese Taipei) Chan Chin-wei (Chinese Taipei) Kao Shao-yuan; 6–1, 7–5	(Chinese Taipei) Hsieh Shu-ying (Chinese Taipei) Juan Ting-fei	(Chinese Taipei) Hsieh Shu-ying (Chinese Taipei) Juan Ting-fei	(South Korea) Kang Seo-kyung (Chinese Taipei) Lee Hua-chen (Chinese Taipei) Chen Yen-ling (Chinese Taipei) Tai Yu-lin
June 13	Alkmaar, Netherlands; Clay $10,000; Singles draw – Doubles draw	(United Kingdom) Eleanor Dean; 6–7^{(1–7)}, 6–3, 6–1	(Netherlands) Daniëlle Harmsen	(Germany) Syna Kayser (Russia) Polina Vinogradova	(France) Estelle Guisard (Bulgaria) Isabella Shinikova (Belgium) Elyne Boeykens (Germany) Vivian Heisen
June 13	Alkmaar, Netherlands; Clay $10,000; Singles draw – Doubles draw	(Poland) Olga Brózda (Poland) Natalia Kołat; 6–7^{(6–8)}, 6–2, [10–2]	(Malta) Kimberley Cassar (Bulgaria) Isabella Shinikova	(Germany) Syna Kayser (Russia) Polina Vinogradova	(France) Estelle Guisard (Bulgaria) Isabella Shinikova (Belgium) Elyne Boeykens (Germany) Vivian Heisen
June 13	Montemor-o-Novo, Portugal; Hard $10,000; Singles draw – Doubles draw	(Spain) Garbiñe Muguruza; 6–4, 6–4	(Venezuela) Andrea Gámiz	(United Kingdom) Amanda Carreras (Portugal) Bárbara Luz	(Russia) Julia Parasyuk (Spain) Pilar Domínguez-López (Spain) Nuria Párrizas Díaz (Mexico) Ximena Hermoso
June 13	Montemor-o-Novo, Portugal; Hard $10,000; Singles draw – Doubles draw	(United Kingdom) Amanda Carreras (Venezuela) Andrea Gámiz; 6–3, 6–4	(Mexico) Ximena Hermoso (Mexico) Ivette López	(United Kingdom) Amanda Carreras (Portugal) Bárbara Luz	(Russia) Julia Parasyuk (Spain) Pilar Domínguez-López (Spain) Nuria Párrizas Díaz (Mexico) Ximena Hermoso
June 13	Madrid, Spain; Clay $10,000; Singles draw – Doubles draw	(Russia) Daria Salnikova; 6–2, 7–6^{(7–5)}	(Italy) Benedetta Davato	(Bulgaria) Aleksandrina Naydenova (Russia) Diana Arutyunova	(Italy) Andreea Văideanu (Italy) Federica Quercia (Spain) Sandra Soler-Sola (Spain) Rocío de la Torre-Sánchez
June 13	Madrid, Spain; Clay $10,000; Singles draw – Doubles draw	(Spain) Rocío de la Torre-Sánchez (Spain) Olga Sáez Larra; 7–6^{(7–2)}, 6–4	(Switzerland) Lisa Sabino (Italy) Andreea Văideanu	(Bulgaria) Aleksandrina Naydenova (Russia) Diana Arutyunova	(Italy) Andreea Văideanu (Italy) Federica Quercia (Spain) Sandra Soler-Sola (Spain) Rocío de la Torre-Sánchez
June 13	Cologne, Germany; Clay $10,000; Singles draw – Doubles draw	(Poland) Sandra Zaniewska; 6–4, 6–2	(Germany) Lena-Marie Hofmann	(Germany) Carolin Daniels (Germany) Bianca Koch	(Czech Republic) Kateřina Kramperová (Czech Republic) Jana Jandová (Germany) Anna Zaja (Germany) Vanessa Henke
June 13	Cologne, Germany; Clay $10,000; Singles draw – Doubles draw	(Germany) Vanessa Henke (Germany) Anna Zaja; 1–6, 6–3, [10–2]	(Germany) Carolin Daniels (Germany) Christina Shakovets	(Germany) Carolin Daniels (Germany) Bianca Koch	(Czech Republic) Kateřina Kramperová (Czech Republic) Jana Jandová (Germany) Anna Zaja (Germany) Vanessa Henke
June 13	Bethany Beach, Delaware, United States; Clay $10,000; Singles draw – Doubles draw	(United States) Lena Litvak; 7–6^{(7–1)}, 4–6, 6–3	(Brazil) Maria Fernanda Alves	(Russia) Angelina Gabueva (United States) Denise Starr	(United States) Kyle McPhillips (United States) Chanelle van Nguyen (United States) Katrine Steffensen (United States) Alexa Guarachi
June 13	Bethany Beach, Delaware, United States; Clay $10,000; Singles draw – Doubles draw	(United States) Alexandra Hirsch (United States) Lena Litvak; 7–5, 3–6, [10–8]	(Brazil) Maria Fernanda Alves (Russia) Angelina Gabueva	(Russia) Angelina Gabueva (United States) Denise Starr	(United States) Kyle McPhillips (United States) Chanelle van Nguyen (United States) Katrine Steffensen (United States) Alexa Guarachi
June 13	New Delhi, India; Hard $10,000; Singles draw – Doubles draw	(China) Yang Zhaoxuan; 6–2, 6–0	(South Korea) Kim Hae-sung	(India) Prerna Bhambri (Mexico) Nadia Abdala	(Poland) Joanna Nalborska (India) Ashvarya Shrivastava (India) Rutuja Bhosale (India) Rushmi Chakravarthi
June 13	New Delhi, India; Hard $10,000; Singles draw – Doubles draw	(South Korea) Kim Hae-sung (South Korea) Kim Ju-eun; 6–3, 6–4	(India) Rushmi Chakravarthi (Israel) Keren Shlomo	(India) Prerna Bhambri (Mexico) Nadia Abdala	(Poland) Joanna Nalborska (India) Ashvarya Shrivastava (India) Rutuja Bhosale (India) Rushmi Chakravarthi
June 13	Balikpapan, Indonesia; Hard $25,000; Singles draw – Doubles draw	(Thailand) Varatchaya Wongteanchai; 7–5, 6–3	(China) Wang Qiang	(Thailand) Nudnida Luangnam (Japan) Ryōko Fuda	(Indonesia) Lavinia Tananta (Indonesia) Ayu-Fani Damayanti (Thailand) Nicha Lertpitaksinchai (Japan) Yurika Sema
June 13	Balikpapan, Indonesia; Hard $25,000; Singles draw – Doubles draw	(Japan) Kanae Hisami (Thailand) Varatchaya Wongteanchai; 6–3, 6–2	(Japan) Natsumi Hamamura (Japan) Yurika Sema	(Thailand) Nudnida Luangnam (Japan) Ryōko Fuda	(Indonesia) Lavinia Tananta (Indonesia) Ayu-Fani Damayanti (Thailand) Nicha Lertpitaksinchai (Japan) Yurika Sema
June 13	Coatzacoalcos, Mexico; Hard $10,000; Singles draw – Doubles draw	(United States) Noel Scott; 6–1, 6–1	(Puerto Rico) Jessica Roland-Rosario	(Mexico) Carolina Betancourt (Mexico) Ana Paula de la Peña	(Switzerland) Stephanie Theiler (Peru) Ingrid Várgas Calvo (United Kingdom) Robyn Beddow (United States) Whitney Jones
June 13	Coatzacoalcos, Mexico; Hard $10,000; Singles draw – Doubles draw	(Mexico) Carolina Betancourt (Puerto Rico) Jessica Roland-Rosario; 6–1, 6–0	(United States) Yawna Allen (United States) Whitney Jones	(Mexico) Carolina Betancourt (Mexico) Ana Paula de la Peña	(Switzerland) Stephanie Theiler (Peru) Ingrid Várgas Calvo (United Kingdom) Robyn Beddow (United States) Whitney Jones
June 13	Pattaya, Thailand; Hard $10,000; Singles draw – Doubles draw	(Thailand) Luksika Kumkhum; 6–3, 6–4	(China) Liang Chen	(China) Zhao Yijing (China) Wang Boyan	(Thailand) Napatsakorn Sankaew (South Korea) Hong Hyun Hui (South Africa) Surina de Beer (South Korea) Yu Min-hwa
June 13	Pattaya, Thailand; Hard $10,000; Singles draw – Doubles draw	(China) Liang Chen (China) Zhao Yijing; 1–6, 6–1, [10–7]	(Thailand) Luksika Kumkhum (Thailand) Napatsakorn Sankaew	(China) Zhao Yijing (China) Wang Boyan	(Thailand) Napatsakorn Sankaew (South Korea) Hong Hyun Hui (South Africa) Surina de Beer (South Korea) Yu Min-hwa
June 13	Santa Fe, Argentina; Clay $10,000; Singles draw – Doubles draw	(Argentina) Vanesa Furlanetto; 7–5, 6–3	(Argentina) Aranza Salut	(Argentina) Andrea Benítez (Argentina) Carolina Zeballos	(Venezuela) Gabriela Coglitore (Argentina) Melina Ferrero (Argentina) Ornella Caron (Paraguay) Isabella Robbiani
June 13	Santa Fe, Argentina; Clay $10,000; Singles draw – Doubles draw	(Argentina) Florencia di Biasi (Argentina) Vanesa Furlanetto; 3–6, 6–4, [10–4]	(Argentina) Betina Jozami (Argentina) Agustina Lepore	(Argentina) Andrea Benítez (Argentina) Carolina Zeballos	(Venezuela) Gabriela Coglitore (Argentina) Melina Ferrero (Argentina) Ornella Caron (Paraguay) Isabella Robbiani
June 20	Boston, United States; Hard $50,000; Singles draw – Doubles draw	(Slovenia) Petra Rampre; 6–4, 5–7, 6–4	(Ukraine) Tetiana Luzhanska	(Canada) Heidi El Tabakh (United States) Ahsha Rolle	(United States) Chichi Scholl (United States) Jessica Pegula (United States) Macall Harkins (United States) Asia Muhammad
June 20	Boston, United States; Hard $50,000; Singles draw – Doubles draw	(Ukraine) Tetiana Luzhanska (United States) Alexandra Mueller; 7–6^{(7–3)}, 6–3	(Canada) Sharon Fichman (Canada) Marie-Ève Pelletier	(Canada) Heidi El Tabakh (United States) Ahsha Rolle	(United States) Chichi Scholl (United States) Jessica Pegula (United States) Macall Harkins (United States) Asia Muhammad
June 20	2011 Open GDF Suez du Périgord; Périgueux, France; Clay $25,000; Singles – Doubles	(France) Séverine Beltrame; 6–4, 6–2	(France) Audrey Bergot	(Spain) Inés Ferrer Suárez (Argentina) Florencia Molinero	(Spain) Leticia Costas-Moreira (Ukraine) Oksana Lyubtsova (France) Marion Gaud (Slovakia) Michaela Hončová
June 20	2011 Open GDF Suez du Périgord; Périgueux, France; Clay $25,000; Singles – Doubles	(Argentina) Florencia Molinero (Japan) Erika Sema; 6–2, 3–6, [10–7]	(Spain) Leticia Costas-Moreira (Spain) Inés Ferrer Suárez	(Spain) Inés Ferrer Suárez (Argentina) Florencia Molinero	(Spain) Leticia Costas-Moreira (Ukraine) Oksana Lyubtsova (France) Marion Gaud (Slovakia) Michaela Hončová
June 20	Rome – Tevere Remo, Italy; Clay $25,000; Singles draw – Doubles draw	(Italy) Karin Knapp; 6–3, 6–0	(France) Laura Thorpe	(France) Kristina Mladenovic (Italy) Gioia Barbieri	(Georgia (country)) Sofia Shapatava (Italy) Anna Remondina (Russia) Ekaterina Bychkova (Paraguay) Verónica Cepede Royg
June 20	Rome – Tevere Remo, Italy; Clay $25,000; Singles draw – Doubles draw	(Paraguay) Verónica Cepede Royg (Argentina) Paula Ormaechea; 7–5, 6–4	(Russia) Marina Shamayko (Georgia (country)) Sofia Shapatava	(France) Kristina Mladenovic (Italy) Gioia Barbieri	(Georgia (country)) Sofia Shapatava (Italy) Anna Remondina (Russia) Ekaterina Bychkova (Paraguay) Verónica Cepede Royg
June 20	2011 Lenzerheide Open; Lenzerheide, Switzerland; Clay $25,000; Singles – Doubles	(Croatia) Ani Mijačika; 6–3, 3–6, 6–3	(Switzerland) Amra Sadiković	(Japan) Chihiro Takayama (Germany) Sarah Gronert	(Switzerland) Stefanie Vögele (Slovakia) Romana Tabak (Chile) Andrea Koch Benvenuto (Romania) Ágnes Szatmári
June 20	2011 Lenzerheide Open; Lenzerheide, Switzerland; Clay $25,000; Singles – Doubles	(Croatia) Ani Mijačika (Switzerland) Amra Sadiković; 4–6, 6–2, [10–4]	(Austria) Nikola Hofmanova (Slovakia) Romana Tabak	(Japan) Chihiro Takayama (Germany) Sarah Gronert	(Switzerland) Stefanie Vögele (Slovakia) Romana Tabak (Chile) Andrea Koch Benvenuto (Romania) Ágnes Szatmári
June 20	2011 Rolls-Royce Women's Cup Kristinehamn; Kristinehamn, Sweden; Clay $25,000; Singles – Doubles	(Slovakia) Jana Čepelová; 6–4, 3–6, 6–4	(Romania) Alexandra Cadanțu	(France) Alizé Lim (Hungary) Tímea Babos	(Sweden) Hilda Melander (Latvia) Diāna Marcinkēviča (Australia) Isabella Holland (Australia) Olivia Rogowska
June 20	2011 Rolls-Royce Women's Cup Kristinehamn; Kristinehamn, Sweden; Clay $25,000; Singles – Doubles	(Bosnia and Herzegovina) Mervana Jugić-Salkić (Finland) Emma Laine; 6–4, 6–4	(Hungary) Tímea Babos (Russia) Ksenia Lykina	(France) Alizé Lim (Hungary) Tímea Babos	(Sweden) Hilda Melander (Latvia) Diāna Marcinkēviča (Australia) Isabella Holland (Australia) Olivia Rogowska
June 20	Alcobaça, Portugal; Hard $10,000; Singles draw – Doubles draw	(France) Victoria Larrière; 6–3, 3–6, 6–3	(Spain) Garbiñe Muguruza	(Spain) Rocío de la Torre-Sánchez (Mexico) Ximena Hermoso	(Portugal) Margarida Moura (United Kingdom) Yasmin Clarke (Germany) Jasmin Steinherr (Spain) Nuria Párrizas Díaz
June 20	Alcobaça, Portugal; Hard $10,000; Singles draw – Doubles draw	(Denmark) Malou Ejdesgaard (Australia) Alenka Hubacek; 6–2, 7–5	(Ecuador) Mariana Correa (United States) Danielle Mills	(Spain) Rocío de la Torre-Sánchez (Mexico) Ximena Hermoso	(Portugal) Margarida Moura (United Kingdom) Yasmin Clarke (Germany) Jasmin Steinherr (Spain) Nuria Párrizas Díaz
June 20	Balş, Romania; Clay $10,000; Singles draw – Doubles draw	(Montenegro) Danka Kovinić; 6–0, 6–1	(Romania) Alice-Andrada Radu	(Romania) Camelia Hristea (Romania) Cristina Mitu	(Romania) Laura-Ioana Andrei (Romania) Raluca Elena Platon (Romania) Ingrid Radu (Italy) Andreea Văideanu
June 20	Balş, Romania; Clay $10,000; Singles draw – Doubles draw	(Romania) Alice-Andrada Radu (Romania) Ingrid Radu; 2–6, 7–6^{(7–4)}, [10–4]	(Romania) Sabina Lupu (Romania) Ilinca Stoica	(Romania) Camelia Hristea (Romania) Cristina Mitu	(Romania) Laura-Ioana Andrei (Romania) Raluca Elena Platon (Romania) Ingrid Radu (Italy) Andreea Văideanu
June 20	Breda, Netherlands; Clay $10,000; Singles draw – Doubles draw	(Russia) Polina Vinogradova; 6–2, 1–6, 6–2	(Netherlands) Lesley Kerkhove	(Netherlands) Kiki Bertens (United Kingdom) Eleanor Dean	(Germany) Syna Kayser (Ukraine) Anna Shkudun (Belarus) Sviatlana Pirazhenka (United Kingdom) Manisha Foster
June 20	Breda, Netherlands; Clay $10,000; Singles draw – Doubles draw	(Netherlands) Eva Wacanno (Australia) Karolina Wlodarczak; 6–2, 6–4	(Netherlands) Kim Kilsdonk (Netherlands) Nicolette van Uitert	(Netherlands) Kiki Bertens (United Kingdom) Eleanor Dean	(Germany) Syna Kayser (Ukraine) Anna Shkudun (Belarus) Sviatlana Pirazhenka (United Kingdom) Manisha Foster
June 20	Cleveland, United States; Clay $10,000; Singles draw – Doubles draw	(United States) Kyle McPhillips; 6–3, 6–2	(China) Xi Li	(Italy) Gaia Sanesi (Russia) Angelina Gabueva	(New Zealand) Dianne Hollands (United States) Elizabeth Lumpkin (Russia) Anastasia Kharchenko (United States) Kate Turvy
June 20	Cleveland, United States; Clay $10,000; Singles draw – Doubles draw	(United States) Brooke Austin (United States) Brooke Bolender; 7–6^{(7–2)}, 6–3	(New Zealand) Dianne Hollands (India) Shikha Uberoi	(Italy) Gaia Sanesi (Russia) Angelina Gabueva	(New Zealand) Dianne Hollands (United States) Elizabeth Lumpkin (Russia) Anastasia Kharchenko (United States) Kate Turvy
June 20	New Delhi, India; Hard $10,000; Singles draw – Doubles draw	(India) Prerna Bhambri; 6–2, 6–3	(Israel) Keren Shlomo	(India) Ratnika Batra (Belgium) Desiree Bastianon	(China) Yang Zhaoxuan (Italy) Stephanie Scimone (South Korea) Kim Hae-sung (India) Rutuja Bhosale
June 20	New Delhi, India; Hard $10,000; Singles draw – Doubles draw	(South Korea) Kim Hae-sung (South Korea) Kim Ju-eun; 7–5, 6–0	(India) Rushmi Chakravarthi (Israel) Keren Shlomo	(India) Ratnika Batra (Belgium) Desiree Bastianon	(China) Yang Zhaoxuan (Italy) Stephanie Scimone (South Korea) Kim Hae-sung (India) Rutuja Bhosale
June 20	İzmir, Turkey; Clay $10,000; Singles draw – Doubles draw	(Ukraine) Elizaveta Ianchuk; 7–5, 6–1	(Bulgaria) Aleksandrina Naydenova	(Russia) Tatiana Kotelnikova (Russia) Eugeniya Pashkova	(Bosnia and Herzegovina) Jasmina Kajtazovič (Slovakia) Anna Karolína Schmiedlová (Russia) Anastasia Rudakova (Italy) Agnese Zucchini
June 20	İzmir, Turkey; Clay $10,000; Singles draw – Doubles draw	(Russia) Tatiana Kotelnikova (Russia) Eugeniya Pashkova; 6–4, 6–0	(Bulgaria) Aleksandrina Naydenova (Slovakia) Anna Karolína Schmiedlová	(Russia) Tatiana Kotelnikova (Russia) Eugeniya Pashkova	(Bosnia and Herzegovina) Jasmina Kajtazovič (Slovakia) Anna Karolína Schmiedlová (Russia) Anastasia Rudakova (Italy) Agnese Zucchini
June 20	Tarakan Island, Indonesia; Hard $10,000; Singles draw – Doubles draw	(Indonesia) Jessy Rompies; 6–1, 6–2	(Indonesia) Ayu-Fani Damayanti	(Indonesia) Grace Sari Ysidora (Japan) Miki Miyamura	(Germany) Jessica Sabeshinskaja (Japan) Kanami Tsuji (Indonesia) Cynthia Melita (Japan) Ai Yamamoto
June 20	Tarakan Island, Indonesia; Hard $10,000; Singles draw – Doubles draw	(Japan) Moe Kawatoko (Japan) Miki Miyamura; 6–2, 7–5	(Indonesia) Jessy Rompies (Indonesia) Grace Sari Ysidora	(Indonesia) Grace Sari Ysidora (Japan) Miki Miyamura	(Germany) Jessica Sabeshinskaja (Japan) Kanami Tsuji (Indonesia) Cynthia Melita (Japan) Ai Yamamoto
June 20	Niš, Serbia; Clay $10,000; Singles draw – Doubles draw	(Serbia) Ana Jovanović; 6–3, 7–6^{(7–4)}	(Slovakia) Vivien Juhászová	(Serbia) Natalija Kostić (Serbia) Saška Gavrilovska	(Austria) Lisa-Maria Moser (Serbia) Marina Kachar (Latvia) Lina Lileikite (North Macedonia) Lina Gjorcheska
June 20	Niš, Serbia; Clay $10,000; Singles draw – Doubles draw	(Czech Republic) Martina Borecká (Slovakia) Vivien Juhászová; 7–6^{(9–7)}, 6–3	(Croatia) Ivana Klepić (Serbia) Natalija Kostić	(Serbia) Natalija Kostić (Serbia) Saška Gavrilovska	(Austria) Lisa-Maria Moser (Serbia) Marina Kachar (Latvia) Lina Lileikite (North Macedonia) Lina Gjorcheska
June 20	Zacatecas, Mexico; Hard $10,000; Singles draw – Doubles draw	(Mexico) Ana Sofia Sánchez; 6–2, 1–6, 6–3	(Puerto Rico) Jessica Roland-Rosario	(Mexico) Ana Paula de la Peña (United States) Whitney Jones	(Mexico) Marcela Zacarías (Peru) Ingrid Várgas Calvo (Belarus) Sasha Khabibulina (United States) Noel Scott
June 20	Zacatecas, Mexico; Hard $10,000; Singles draw – Doubles draw	(Mexico) Ana Paula de la Peña (Peru) Ingrid Várgas Calvo; 3–6, 7–5, [10–8]	(United States) Whitney Jones (United States) Hilary Toole	(Mexico) Ana Paula de la Peña (United States) Whitney Jones	(Mexico) Marcela Zacarías (Peru) Ingrid Várgas Calvo (Belarus) Sasha Khabibulina (United States) Noel Scott
June 20	Pattaya, Thailand; Hard $10,000; Singles draw – Doubles draw	(Thailand) Varatchaya Wongteanchai; 6–4, 6–1	(Russia) Anna Tyulpa	(China) Zhao Yijing (Thailand) Nicha Lertpitaksinchai	(Thailand) Napatsakorn Sankaew (Thailand) Luksika Kumkhum (Japan) Akiko Omae (Japan) Miyabi Inoue
June 20	Pattaya, Thailand; Hard $10,000; Singles draw – Doubles draw	(Japan) Emi Mutaguchi (Japan) Kotomi Takahata; 4–6, 7–5, [10–5]	(China) Liang Chen (China) Zhao Yijing	(China) Zhao Yijing (Thailand) Nicha Lertpitaksinchai	(Thailand) Napatsakorn Sankaew (Thailand) Luksika Kumkhum (Japan) Akiko Omae (Japan) Miyabi Inoue
June 27	2011 International Country Cuneo; Cuneo, Italy; Clay $100,000; Singles – Doubles	(Georgia (country)) Anna Tatishvili; 6–4, 6–3	(Netherlands) Arantxa Rus	(Switzerland) Stefanie Vögele (Croatia) Mirjana Lučić	(France) Alizé Cornet (France) Pauline Parmentier (Croatia) Petra Martić (France) Laura Thorpe
June 27	2011 International Country Cuneo; Cuneo, Italy; Clay $100,000; Singles – Doubles	(Luxembourg) Mandy Minella (Switzerland) Stefanie Vögele; 6–3, 6–2	(Czech Republic) Eva Birnerová (Russia) Vesna Dolonts	(Switzerland) Stefanie Vögele (Croatia) Mirjana Lučić	(France) Alizé Cornet (France) Pauline Parmentier (Croatia) Petra Martić (France) Laura Thorpe
June 27	2011 Bella Cup; Toruń, Poland; Clay $50,000+H; Singles – Doubles	(Romania) Edina Gallovits-Hall; 6–4, 6–3	(France) Stéphanie Foretz Gacon	(Romania) Mădălina Gojnea (Romania) Elena Bogdan	(Argentina) Paula Ormaechea (Poland) Magda Linette (Romania) Liana Ungur (Poland) Paula Kania
June 27	2011 Bella Cup; Toruń, Poland; Clay $50,000+H; Singles – Doubles	(France) Stéphanie Foretz Gacon (Germany) Tatjana Malek; 6–2, 7–5	(Romania) Edina Gallovits-Hall (Slovenia) Andreja Klepač	(Romania) Mădălina Gojnea (Romania) Elena Bogdan	(Argentina) Paula Ormaechea (Poland) Magda Linette (Romania) Liana Ungur (Poland) Paula Kania
June 27	2011 Open Diputación Ciudad de Pozoblanco; Pozoblanco, Spain; Hard $50,000; Singles – Doubles	(Greece) Eleni Daniilidou; 6–3, 6–2	(Bulgaria) Elitsa Kostova	(Georgia (country)) Margalita Chakhnashvili (Spain) Beatriz García Vidagany	(Russia) Yana Buchina (China) Lu Jingjing (Israel) Julia Glushko (Russia) Nina Bratchikova
June 27	2011 Open Diputación Ciudad de Pozoblanco; Pozoblanco, Spain; Hard $50,000; Singles – Doubles	(Russia) Nina Bratchikova (France) Irena Pavlovic; 6–2, 6–4	(Russia) Marina Melnikova (Georgia (country)) Sofia Shapatava	(Georgia (country)) Margalita Chakhnashvili (Spain) Beatriz García Vidagany	(Russia) Yana Buchina (China) Lu Jingjing (Israel) Julia Glushko (Russia) Nina Bratchikova
June 27	2011 Open GDF Suez de la Porte du Hainaut; Denain, France; Clay $25,000; Singles – Doubles	(Brazil) Teliana Pereira; 6–4, 6–3	(Ukraine) Valentyna Ivakhnenko	(Paraguay) Verónica Cepede Royg (Czech Republic) Iveta Gerlová	(France) Jessica Ginier (Ukraine) Oksana Lyubtsova (Romania) Mihaela Buzărnescu (France) Nathalie Piquion
June 27	2011 Open GDF Suez de la Porte du Hainaut; Denain, France; Clay $25,000; Singles – Doubles	(Paraguay) Verónica Cepede Royg (Brazil) Teliana Pereira; 6–1, 6–1	(France) Céline Ghesquière (France) Elixane Lechemia	(Paraguay) Verónica Cepede Royg (Czech Republic) Iveta Gerlová	(France) Jessica Ginier (Ukraine) Oksana Lyubtsova (Romania) Mihaela Buzărnescu (France) Nathalie Piquion
June 27	2011 Swedish Ladies Ystad; Ystad, Sweden; Clay $25,000; Singles – Doubles	(Bulgaria) Dia Evtimova; 6–3, 6–4	(Slovakia) Jana Čepelová	(France) Alizé Lim (Austria) Melanie Klaffner	(Bosnia and Herzegovina) Mervana Jugić-Salkić (Germany) Scarlett Werner (Australia) Isabella Holland (Belarus) Ilona Kremen
June 27	2011 Swedish Ladies Ystad; Ystad, Sweden; Clay $25,000; Singles – Doubles	(Romania) Alexandra Cadanțu (Romania) Diana Enache; 6–4, 2–6, [10–5]	(Bosnia and Herzegovina) Mervana Jugić-Salkić (Finland) Emma Laine	(France) Alizé Lim (Austria) Melanie Klaffner	(Bosnia and Herzegovina) Mervana Jugić-Salkić (Germany) Scarlett Werner (Australia) Isabella Holland (Belarus) Ilona Kremen
June 27	Middelburg, Netherlands; Clay $25,000; Singles draw – Doubles draw	(Netherlands) Bibiane Schoofs; 7–6^{(7–4)}, 6–1	(Netherlands) Lesley Kerkhove	(France) Audrey Bergot (Argentina) Florencia Molinero	(Ukraine) Anna Shkudun (Netherlands) Eva Wacanno (Germany) Nicola Geuer (Netherlands) Kelly Versteeg
June 27	Middelburg, Netherlands; Clay $25,000; Singles draw – Doubles draw	(Netherlands) Quirine Lemoine (Ukraine) Maryna Zanevska; 6–3, 6–4	(United States) Julia Cohen (Argentina) Florencia Molinero	(France) Audrey Bergot (Argentina) Florencia Molinero	(Ukraine) Anna Shkudun (Netherlands) Eva Wacanno (Germany) Nicola Geuer (Netherlands) Kelly Versteeg
June 27	Stuttgart-Vaihingen, Germany; Clay $25,000; Singles draw – Doubles draw	(Hungary) Tímea Babos; 1–6, 6–2, 6–3	(Germany) Korina Perkovic	(Slovakia) Zuzana Luknárová (Italy) Evelyn Mayr	(Germany) Laura Siegemund (Georgia (country)) Ekaterine Gorgodze (Poland) Sandra Zaniewska (Germany) Annika Beck
June 27	Stuttgart-Vaihingen, Germany; Clay $25,000; Singles draw – Doubles draw	(Croatia) Darija Jurak (France) Anaïs Laurendon; 4–6, 6–1, [10–0]	(Czech Republic) Hana Birnerová (Liechtenstein) Stephanie Vogt	(Slovakia) Zuzana Luknárová (Italy) Evelyn Mayr	(Germany) Laura Siegemund (Georgia (country)) Ekaterine Gorgodze (Poland) Sandra Zaniewska (Germany) Annika Beck
June 27	Melilla, Spain; Hard $10,000; Singles draw – Doubles draw	(Spain) Rocío de la Torre-Sánchez; 6–0, 6–1	(Denmark) Malou Ejdesgaard	(Spain) Carmen López-Rueda (Romania) Diana Stomlega	(Russia) Natalia Orlova (Spain) Yvonne Cavallé-Reimers (Spain) Olga Sáez Larra (Sweden) Evelina Virtanen
June 27	Melilla, Spain; Hard $10,000; Singles draw – Doubles draw	(Kazakhstan) Aselya Arginbayeva (Russia) Tanja Samodelok; 1–6, 6–3, [10–7]	(Denmark) Malou Ejdesgaard (Australia) Alenka Hubacek	(Spain) Carmen López-Rueda (Romania) Diana Stomlega	(Russia) Natalia Orlova (Spain) Yvonne Cavallé-Reimers (Spain) Olga Sáez Larra (Sweden) Evelina Virtanen
June 27	Buffalo, New York, United States; Clay $10,000; Singles draw – Doubles draw	(United States) Lauren Davis; 5–7, 6–2, 6–4	(United States) Nicole Gibbs	(United States) Danielle Collins (United States) Robin Anderson	(United States) Jamie Loeb (United States) Jennifer Elie (United States) Alexis King (United States) Anna Mamalat
June 27	Buffalo, New York, United States; Clay $10,000; Singles draw – Doubles draw	(New Zealand) Dianne Hollands (India) Shikha Uberoi; 7–5, 6–4	(Poland) Paulina Bigos (Canada) Brittany Wowchuk	(United States) Danielle Collins (United States) Robin Anderson	(United States) Jamie Loeb (United States) Jennifer Elie (United States) Alexis King (United States) Anna Mamalat
June 27	Prokuplje, Serbia; Clay $10,000; Singles draw – Doubles draw	(Serbia) Natalija Kostić; 6–2, 6–3	(Slovakia) Nikola Vajdová	(Romania) Ingrid Radu (Serbia) Julija Lukać	(Hungary) Zsófia Susányi (Serbia) Dunja Šunkić (Czech Republic) Martina Borecká (Serbia) Saška Gavrilovska
June 27	Prokuplje, Serbia; Clay $10,000; Singles draw – Doubles draw	(Slovenia) Polona Reberšak (Hungary) Zsófia Susányi; 6–4, 7–6^{(7–2)}	(Bulgaria) Isabella Shinikova (Bulgaria) Julia Stamatova	(Romania) Ingrid Radu (Serbia) Julija Lukać	(Hungary) Zsófia Susányi (Serbia) Dunja Šunkić (Czech Republic) Martina Borecká (Serbia) Saška Gavrilovska
June 27	İzmir, Turkey; Clay $10,000; Singles draw – Doubles draw	(Italy) Agnese Zucchini; 7–5, 6–3	(Bulgaria) Aleksandrina Naydenova	(Bosnia and Herzegovina) Jasmina Kajtazovič (Ukraine) Elizaveta Ianchuk	(Slovakia) Anna Karolína Schmiedlová (Russia) Maya Gaverova (Russia) Daria Mironova (Slovakia) Monika Sirilová
June 27	İzmir, Turkey; Clay $10,000; Singles draw – Doubles draw	(Russia) Tatiana Kotelnikova (Russia) Eugeniya Pashkova; 7–6^{(7–3)}, 6–4	(Armenia) Ani Amiraghyan (Russia) Alexandra Romanova	(Bosnia and Herzegovina) Jasmina Kajtazovič (Ukraine) Elizaveta Ianchuk	(Slovakia) Anna Karolína Schmiedlová (Russia) Maya Gaverova (Russia) Daria Mironova (Slovakia) Monika Sirilová
June 27	La Habana, Cuba; Hard $10,000; Singles draw – Doubles draw	(Israel) Ofri Lankri; 6–2, 6–4	(Japan) Makiho Kozawa	(Austria) Jeannine Prentner (Switzerland) Stephanie Theiler	(Brazil) Raquel Piltcher (Colombia) Laura Ucros (Cuba) Yamile Fors Guerra (Peru) Ximena Siles Luna
June 27	La Habana, Cuba; Hard $10,000; Singles draw – Doubles draw	(Cuba) Misleydis Díaz González (Cuba) Yamile Fors Guerra; 6–2, 6–2	(Argentina) Andrea Benítez (United States) Margaret Lumia	(Austria) Jeannine Prentner (Switzerland) Stephanie Theiler	(Brazil) Raquel Piltcher (Colombia) Laura Ucros (Cuba) Yamile Fors Guerra (Peru) Ximena Siles Luna
June 27	Pattaya, Thailand; Hard $10,000; Singles draw – Doubles draw	(China) Liang Chen; 2–6, 7–6^{(8–6)}, 7–5	(Thailand) Luksika Kumkhum	(China) Zhao Yijing (Japan) Chiaki Okadaue	(Japan) Mari Tanaka (Japan) Maya Kato (Russia) Anna Tyulpa (Japan) Emi Mutaguchi
June 27	Pattaya, Thailand; Hard $10,000; Singles draw – Doubles draw	(China) Liang Chen (China) Zhao Yijing; 6–3, 6–4	(Japan) Misa Eguchi (Japan) Akiko Omae	(China) Zhao Yijing (Japan) Chiaki Okadaue	(Japan) Mari Tanaka (Japan) Maya Kato (Russia) Anna Tyulpa (Japan) Emi Mutaguchi
June 27	São José dos Campos, Brazil; Clay $10,000; Singles draw – Doubles draw	(Brazil) Maria Fernanda Alves; 6–1, 7–5	(Brazil) Nathaly Kurata	(Brazil) Vivian Segnini (Brazil) Carla Forte	(Brazil) Fernanda Faria (Brazil) Eduarda Piai (Brazil) Natasha Lotuffo (Brazil) Monique Albuquerque
June 27	São José dos Campos, Brazil; Clay $10,000; Singles draw – Doubles draw	(Brazil) Maria Fernanda Alves (Brazil) Carla Forte; 6–4, 0–6, [10–4]	(Brazil) Monique Albuquerque (Brazil) Fernanda Faria	(Brazil) Vivian Segnini (Brazil) Carla Forte	(Brazil) Fernanda Faria (Brazil) Eduarda Piai (Brazil) Natasha Lotuffo (Brazil) Monique Albuquerque

== See also ==
- 2011 ITF Women's Circuit
- 2011 ITF Women's Circuit (January–March)
- 2011 ITF Women's Circuit (July–September)
- 2011 ITF Women's Circuit (October–December)
- 2011 WTA Tour
