= 2009 ITF Women's Circuit =

Women's tennis tournament series

Details

Achievements (singles)

The ITF Women's Circuit is the second-tier tour for women's professional tennis organised by the International Tennis Federation, and is a tier below the WTA Tour. The ITF Women's Circuit includes tournaments with prize money ranging from $10,000 up to $100,000.

The 2009 ITF Women's Circuit was a series of professional tennis tournaments organized by the International Tennis Federation (ITF) for female players. These events serve as a stepping stone for players on their way to the WTA Tour, offering ranking points and prize money. Players compete in singles and doubles events at various levels of competition across the globe.

== Notable players ==
Many players who participated in the ITF Circuit in 2009 later went on to achieve significant success on the WTA Tour. Some of the notable rising stars at that time included:

- Venus Williams and Serena Williams continued to dominate on the WTA Tour, although they didn't participate much in the ITF Circuit in 2009.
- Ana Ivanović and Maria Sharapova were also higher-profile players on the WTA but remained fixtures in the tennis world.
- Alexandra Dulgheru (Romania) and Monica Puig (Puerto Rico) were among the young up-and-coming players.

== Schedule ==
$50,000 – $100,000 tournaments
$10,000 – $25,000 tournaments

=== January ===
| Week | Tournament | Winner | Runner-up |
|---|---|---|---|
| January 12, 2009 | Glasgow, United Kingdom; Hard $10,000 | (Finland) Emma Laine; 4–6 6–2 7–6^{(2)} | (France) Stéphanie Vongsouthi |
| January 12, 2009 | Glasgow, United Kingdom; Hard $10,000 | (Austria) Sandra Klemenschits (Luxembourg) Claudine Schaul; 6–3 4–6 [10–7] | (Netherlands) Nicolette van Uitert (Belarus) Viktoria Yemialyanava |
| January 12, 2009 | Boca Raton, Florida, United States; Clay $25,000 | (Venezuela) Gabriela Paz; 6–4 7–6^{(4)} | (Canada) Sharon Fichman |
| January 12, 2009 | Boca Raton, Florida, United States; Clay $25,000 | (Russia) Alina Jidkova (Belarus) Darya Kustova; 6–4 6–2 | (United States) Kimberly Couts (Canada) Sharon Fichman |
| January 19, 2009 | Kaarst, Germany; Carpet $10,000 | (Germany) Sarah Gronert; 2–6 6–4 7–5 | (Latvia) Irina Kuzmina |
| January 19, 2009 | Kaarst, Germany; Carpet $10,000 | (Russia) Elena Chalova (Belarus) Marina Melnikova; 6–3 6–2 | (Germany) Julia Babilon (Canada) Franziska Etzel |
| January 19, 2009 | Wrexham, United Kingdom; Hard $10,000 | (Luxembourg) Claudine Schaul; 6–1 3–6 6–4 | (France) Constance Sibille |
| January 19, 2009 | Wrexham, United Kingdom; Hard $10,000 | (Slovakia) Martina Babáková (Czech Republic) Iveta Gerlová; 2–6 6–3 [11–9] | (United Kingdom) Danielle Brown (United Kingdom) Elizabeth Thomas |
| January 19, 2009 | Lutz, Florida, United States; Clay $25,000 | (Canada) Sharon Fichman; 6–4 7–6^{(5)} | (United States) Lauren Albanese |
| January 19, 2009 | Lutz, Florida, United States; Clay $25,000 | (United States) Kimberly Couts (Canada) Sharon Fichman; 6–4 7–5 | (United States) Story Tweedie-Yates (United States) Mashona Washington |
| January 26, 2009 | Grenoble, France; Hard $10,000 | (United Kingdom) Naomi Broady; 6–4 6–2 | (France) Youlia Fedossova |
| January 26, 2009 | Grenoble, France; Hard $10,000 | (France) Youlia Fedossova (France) Virginie Pichet; 6–3 6–3 | (Russia) Maria Kondratieva (France) Sophie Lefèvre |
| January 26, 2009 | Hyderabad, India; Clay $10,000 | (Russia) Natela Dzalamidze; 1–6 6–2 6–4 | (Russia) Anna Rapoport |
| January 26, 2009 | Hyderabad, India; Clay $10,000 | (India) Parija Maloo (India) Poojashree Venkatesha; 6–1 6–2 | (India) Shivika Burman (India) Kumari-Sweta Solanki |
| January 26, 2009 | Laguna Niguel, California, United States; Hard $25,000 | (United States) Alexa Glatch; 6–1 6–0 | (South Africa) Chanelle Scheepers |
| January 26, 2009 | Laguna Niguel, California, United States; Hard $25,000 | (Germany) Vanessa Henke (Croatia) Darija Jurak; 4–6 6–3 [10–8] | (United States) Megan Moulton-Levy (Germany) Laura Siegemund |

=== February ===
| Week | Tournament | Winner | Runner-up | Refs |
|---|---|---|---|---|
| February 2, 2009 | Mallorca, Spain; Clay $10,000 | (Spain) Eloisa Compostizo de Andrés; 6–0 6–7^{(5)} 6–2 | (Italy) Martina Caregaro | |
| February 2, 2009 | Mallorca, Spain; Clay $10,000 | (Spain) Rebecca Bou Nogueiro (Morocco) Fatima El Allami; 6–4 6–1 | (Spain) Leticia Costas (Spain) Lucía Sainz | |
| February 2, 2009 | Vale do Lobo, Portugal; Hard $10,000 | (Germany) Nicola Geuer; 4–6 6–2 6–3 | (Belgium) Appollonia Melzani | |
| February 2, 2009 | Vale do Lobo, Portugal; Hard $10,000 | N/A | N/A | |
| February 2, 2009 | Belfort, France; Carpet $25,000 | (Czech Republic) Lucie Hradecká; 6–3 6–2 | (Russia) Vesna Dolonts | |
| February 2, 2009 | Belfort, France; Carpet $25,000 | (Latvia) Kuzmina (Ukraine) Lyubtsova; 6–3 3–6 [10–5] | (France) Fedossova (France) Pichet | |
| February 2, 2009 | Burnie, Australia; Hard $25,000 | (United States) Abigail Spears; 6–4 6–2 | (China) Lu Jingjing | |
| February 2, 2009 | Burnie, Australia; Hard $25,000 | (United States) Spears (Australia) Adamczak; 6–2 6–4 | (China) Xu (China) Zhou | |
| February 2, 2009 | Rancho Mirage, California, United States; Hard $25,000 | (Ukraine) Julia Vakulenko; 6–0 6–1 | (United States) Lauren Albanese | |
| February 2, 2009 | Rancho Mirage, California, United States; Hard $25,000 | (South Africa) Grandin (United States) Nagle; 6–2 7–6^{(6)} | (Russia) Jidkova (Belarus) Kustova | |
| February 2, 2009 | Sutton, United Kingdom; Hard $25,000 | (United Kingdom) Katie O'Brien; 3–6 6–2 6–4 | (Australia) Johanna Konta | |
| February 2, 2009 | Sutton, United Kingdom; Hard $25,000 | (United States) Kops-Jones (Czech Republic) Voráčová; 6–3 6–3 | (United Kingdom) O'Brien (Canada) Marino | |
| February 9, 2009 | Albufeira, Portugal; Hard $10,000 | (Czech Republic) Darina Šeděnková; 6–3 6–2 | (Italy) Lisa Sabino | |
| February 9, 2009 | Albufeira, Portugal; Hard $10,000 | (Czech Republic) Lucie Kriegsmannová (Czech Republic) Šeděnková; 6–0 6–2 | (Italy) Gatto-Monticone (Italy) Quercia | |
| February 9, 2009 | Jiangmen, China; Hard $10,000 | (China) Duan Yingying; 6–2 6–4 | (China) Xie Yan-ze | |
| February 9, 2009 | Jiangmen, China; Hard $10,000 | (China) Hao (Chinese Taipei) Kao; 6–0 7–5 | (China) Xie (China) Zhang Shuai | |
| February 9, 2009 | Mallorca, Spain; Clay $10,000 | (Austria) Tina Schiechtl; 5–7 6–4 7–5 | (France) Laura Thorpe | |
| February 9, 2009 | Mallorca, Spain; Clay $10,000 | (Serbia) Kozić (France) Thorpe; 6–3 2–6 [10–3] | (Czech Republic) Dobrá (Poland) Kiszczyńska | |
| February 9, 2009 | Mildura, Australia; Grass $25,000 | (United States) Abigail Spears; 5–7 6–3 6–2 | (Kyrgyzstan) Ksenia Palkina | |
| February 9, 2009 | Mildura, Australia; Grass $25,000 | (China) Lu (China) Sun; 7–6^{(2)} 7–6^{(4)} | (China) Han (China) Ji | |
| February 9, 2009 | Stockholm, Sweden; Hard $25,000 | (Germany) Tatjana Malek; 6–3 6–2 | (Hungary) Anikó Kapros | |
| February 9, 2009 | Stockholm, Sweden; Hard $25,000 | (France) Huck (Finland) Laine; 3–6 7–6^{(5) [10–8]} | (Austria) Klaffner (Belarus) Milevskaya | |
| February 9, 2009 | Cali, Colombia; Clay $50,000 | (Belarus) Anastasiya Yakimova; 6–3 6–0 | (Paraguay) Rossana de los Ríos | |
| February 9, 2009 | Cali, Colombia; Clay $50,000 | (Argentina) Jozami (Spain) Parra Santonja; 6–3 6–1 | (Portugal) Piedade (Belarus) Yakimova | |
| February 9, 2009 | Midland, Michigan, USA; Hard $75,000 | (Czech Republic) Lucie Hradecká; 6–3 6–3 | (Greece) Eleni Daniilidou | |
| February 9, 2009 | Midland, Michigan, USA; Hard $75,000 | (Chinese Taipei) Chen (Japan) Fujiwara; 7–5 7–6^{(5)} | (Hungary) Czink (United States) Lee-Waters | |
| February 16, 2009 | Guangzhou, China; Hard $10,000 | (China) Zhou Yimiao; 6–3 4–6 6–0 | (China) Liang Chen | |
| February 16, 2009 | Guangzhou, China; Hard $10,000 | (China) Ji (China) Liang; 6–7^{(7)} 6–2 [10–3] | (China) Han (China) Sun | |
| February 16, 2009 | Portimão, Portugal; Hard $10,000 | (Spain) Sandra Soler-Sola; 3–6 6–2 6–3 | (Russia) Nina Bratchikova | |
| February 16, 2009 | Portimão, Portugal; Hard $10,000 | (Russia) Isaeva (Armenia) Nikoyan; 7–6^{(5)} 6–3 | (Brazil) Piltcher (Brazil) Vaisemberg | |
| February 16, 2009 | Surprise, Arizona, United States; Hard $25,000 | (Belgium) Yanina Wickmayer; 6–7^{(0)} 6–3 4–3 ret | (Ukraine) Julia Vakulenko | |
| February 16, 2009 | Surprise, Arizona, United States; Hard $25,000 | (Argentina) Cravero (Russia) Ivanova; 6–1 6–1 | (United States) Rolle (Belgium) Wickmayer | |
| February 23, 2009 | Biberach, Germany; Hard $50,000 | (Croatia) Karolina Šprem; 6–1 6–2 | (Belgium) Kirsten Flipkens | |
| February 23, 2009 | Biberach, Germany; Hard $50,000 | (Austria) Klaffner (Austria) Klemenschits; 3–6 6–4 [17–15] | (Germany) Barrois (Austria) Meusburger | |
| February 23, 2009 | Clearwater, Florida, United States; Hard $50,000 | (France) Julie Coin; 3–6 1–1 def. | (Belgium) Yanina Wickmayer | |
| February 23, 2009 | Clearwater, Florida, United States; Hard $50,000 | (Czech Republic) Hradecká (Czech Republic) Paštiková def. | (Italy) Camerin (Belgium) Wickmayer | |

=== March ===
| Week | Tournament | Winner | Runner-up | Refs |
|---|---|---|---|---|
| March 2, 2009 | Buchen, Germany; Carpet $10,000 | (Germany) Korina Perkovic; 6–3 7–6^{(0)} | (Italy) Romina Oprandi | |
| March 2, 2009 | Buchen, Germany; Carpet $10,000 | (Bosnia and Herzegovina) Martinović (Italy) Oprandi; 5–7 7–5 [10–8] | (Ukraine) Avdiyenko (Russia) Poltoratskaya | |
| March 2, 2009 | Giza, Egypt; Clay $10,000 | (Georgia (country)) Oksana Kalashnikova; 6–4 4–6 6–3 | (Spain) Eva Fernández Brugués | |
| March 2, 2009 | Giza, Egypt; Clay $10,000 | (Morocco) El Allami (Georgia (country)) Kalashnikova; 6–4 6–2 | (Netherlands) Meddens (Netherlands) Schoofs | |
| March 2, 2009 | Lyon, France; Hard $10,000 | (China) Zhang Shuai; 1–6 6–1 6–3 | (France) Claire Feuerstein | |
| March 2, 2009 | Lyon, France; Hard $10,000 | (China) Lu (China) Sun; 6–4 7–5 | (Turkey) Özgen (China) Zhang | |
| March 2, 2009 | Ra'anana, Israel; Hard $10,000 | (Germany) Sarah Gronert; 6–0 6–1 | (Belgium) Lavinia Lobbinger | |
| March 2, 2009 | Ra'anana, Israel; Hard $10,000 | (Germany) Gronert (Israel) Shlomo; 7–5 7–5 | (Switzerland) Kovarčíková (Czech Republic) Linhova | |
| March 2, 2009 | Fort Walton Beach, Florida, United States; Hard $25,000 | (Venezuela) Gabriela Paz; 1–6 6–4 7–5 | (Belarus) Ekaterina Dzehalevich | |
| March 2, 2009 | Fort Walton Beach, Florida, United States; Hard $25,000 | (Russia) Panova (Belarus) Poutchek; 6–2 6–2 | (Russia) Bychkova (Belarus) Dzehalevich | |
| March 2, 2009 | Minsk, Belarus; Carpet $25,000 | (Belarus) Darya Kustova; 6–7^{(3)} 6–1 6–4 | (United Kingdom) Katie O'Brien | |
| March 2, 2009 | Minsk, Belarus; Carpet $25,000 | (Belarus) Bohush (Belarus) Kustova; 6–1 4–6 [10–8] | (Russia) Diatchenko (Russia) Pashkova | |
| March 2, 2009 | Sydney, Australia; Hard $25,000 | (China) Zhou Yi-miao; 6–3 6–4 | (Japan) Yurika Sema | |
| March 2, 2009 | Sydney, Australia; Hard $25,000 | (Australia) Adamczak (South Africa) du Plessis; 6–3 7–5 | (China) Han (China) Ji | |
| March 9, 2009 | Dijon, France; Hard $10,000 | (France) Violette Huck; 6–4 7–6^{(2)} | (Romania) Laura-Ioana Andrei | |
| March 9, 2009 | Dijon, France; Hard $10,000 | (Netherlands) Harmsen (Netherlands) Kilsdonk; 7–6^{(2)} 6–1 | (United Kingdom) Elliott (France) Huck | |
| March 9, 2009 | Giza, Egypt; Clay $10,000 | (Russia) Galina Fokina; 6–4 6–2 | (Georgia (country)) Oksana Kalashnikova | |
| March 9, 2009 | Giza, Egypt; Clay $10,000 | (Russia) Fokina (Ukraine) Sotnikova; 6–4 3–6 [10–8] | (Netherlands) Schoofs (Poland) Zaniewska | |
| March 9, 2009 | Gran Canaria, Spain; Hard $10,000 | (United Kingdom) Emily Webley-Smith; 6–0 7–6^{(5)} | (Russia) Elena Chalova | |
| March 9, 2009 | Gran Canaria, Spain; Hard $10,000 | (China) Lu (China) Sun; 6–3 7–6^{(1)} | (Russia) Buchina (Slovenia) Mohorcic | |
| March 9, 2009 | North Shore City, New Zealand; Hard $10,000 | (Hong Kong) Zhang Ling; 6–1 6–0 | (Chinese Taipei) Hwang I-hsuan | |
| March 9, 2009 | North Shore City, New Zealand; Hard $10,000 | (South Korea) Kim (Japan) Maekawa; 7–5 7–6^{(4)} | (Australia) Bai (Australia) Binnie | |
| March 9, 2009 | Rome, Italy; Clay $10,000 | (Poland) Karolina Kosińska; 6–2 3–6 6–4 | (Bulgaria) Dia Evtimova | |
| March 9, 2009 | Rome, Italy; Clay $10,000 | (Italy) Giovine (Italy) Sulpizio; 4–6 6–0 [10–6] | (Slovenia) Kajtazovic (Spain) Sainz | |
| March 16, 2009 | Amiens, France; Clay $10,000 | (France) Violette Huck; 6–3 6–4 | (France) Audrey Bergot | |
| March 16, 2009 | Amiens, France; Clay $10,000 | (Poland) Brózda (Poland) Kiszczyńska; 6–2 6–1 | (Romania) Hîncu (France) Laurendon | |
| March 16, 2009 | Bath, United Kingdom; Hard $10,000 | (France) Stephanie Vongsouthi; 6–2 6–4 | (Italy) Verdiana Verardi | |
| March 16, 2009 | Bath, United Kingdom; Hard $10,000 | (Switzerland) Boffa (United Kingdom) Fitzpatrick; 6–1 6–1 | (Czech Republic) Chvojková (Czech Republic) Vaňková | |
| March 16, 2009 | Hamilton, New Zealand; Hard $10,000 | (Indonesia) Ayu-Fani Damayanti; 6–4 4–6 6–3 | (Thailand) Noppawan Lertcheewakarn | |
| March 16, 2009 | Hamilton, New Zealand; Hard $10,000 | (South Korea) Kim (Japan) Maekawa; 7–5 6–3 | (Indonesia) Rompies (Thailand) Wongteanchai | |
| March 16, 2009 | Lima, Peru; Clay $10,000 | (Argentina) Maria-Emilia Salerni; 6–2 6–1 | (Argentina) Lucía Jara Lozano | |
| March 16, 2009 | Lima, Peru; Clay $10,000 | (Argentina) Jara Lozano (Argentina) Salerni; 7–6^{(3)} 6–3 | (Argentina) Beltrami (Argentina) Búa | |
| March 16, 2009 | Rome, Italy; Clay $10,000 | (Belarus) Darya Kustova; 6–2 6–2 | (Poland) Anna Korzeniak | |
| March 16, 2009 | Rome, Italy; Clay $10,000 | (Czech Republic) Dobrá (Poland) Kosińska; 6–3 6–4 | (Italy) Giovine (Italy) Sulpizio | |
| March 16, 2009 | Cairo, Egypt; Clay $25,000 | (Germany) Kathrin Wörle; 6–2 6–4 | (Italy) Nathalie Viérin | |
| March 16, 2009 | Cairo, Egypt; Clay $25,000 | (Hungary) Kapros (Hungary) Marosi; 7–5 6–3 | (United States) Moulton-Levy (Germany) Siegemund | |
| March 16, 2009 | Irapuato, Mexico; Hard $25,000 | (South Africa) Chanelle Scheepers; 6–1 7–5 | (Russia) Natalia Ryzhonkova | |
| March 16, 2009 | Irapuato, Mexico; Hard $25,000 | (Argentina) Cravero (Argentina) Spiegel; 6–1 6–0 | (Argentina) Esperón (South Africa) Scheepers | |
| March 16, 2009 | Redding, California, United States; Hard $25,000 | (United States) Laura Granville; 6–2 2–6 6–4 | (Japan) Rika Fujiwara | |
| March 16, 2009 | Redding, California, United States; Hard $25,000 | (Belarus) Orlik (Slovenia) Zec Peškirič; 7–6^{(4)} 6–4 | (Russia) Panova (Japan) Yonemura | |
| March 16, 2009 | Tenerife, Spain; Hard $25,000 | (Russia) Elena Bovina; 6–2 6–4 | (Canada) Rebecca Marino | |
| March 16, 2009 | Tenerife, Spain; Hard $25,000 | (China) Sun (China) Zhang; 6–1 6–2 | (Spain) Fondevila Castro (France) Thorpe | |

=== April ===
| Week | Tournament | Winner | Runner-up | Refs |
|---|---|---|---|---|
| April 6 2009 | Torhout, Belgium; Hard $100,000 | (Croatia) Karolina Šprem; 6–1 6–4 | (Ukraine) Viktoriya Kutuzova | |
| April 6 2009 | Torhout, Belgium; Hard $100,000 | (Netherlands) Krajicek (Belgium) Wickmayer; 6–4, 6–0 | (Germany) Görges (Austria) Klemenschits | |
| April 6 2009 | Monzón, Spain; Hard $75,000 | (Japan) Kimiko Date-Krumm; 7–5, 6–2 | (Romania) Alexandra Dulgheru | |
| April 6 2009 | Monzón, Spain; Hard $75,000 | (Chinese Taipei) Chen (Russia) Manasieva; 2–6, 6–4, [10–8] | (Italy) Brianti (Georgia (country)) Chakhnashvili | |
| April 6 2009 | 2009 River Hills USTA Women's $25,000 Challenger Jackson, USA; Clay $25,000 | (Ukraine) Yuliana Fedak; 6–2, 6–1 | (Germany) Laura Siegemund | |
| April 6 2009 | 2009 River Hills USTA Women's $25,000 Challenger Jackson, USA; Clay $25,000 | (Australia) Adamczak (Russia) Rodionova; 6–3 6–4 | (United States) Granville (United States) Zalameda | |
| April 6 2009 | Foggia, Italy; Clay $10,000 | (Poland) Anna Korzeniak; 6–3 6–1 | (France) Kristina Mladenovic | |
| April 6 2009 | Foggia, Italy; Clay $10,000 | (Netherlands) Meddens (France) Kristina Mladenovic; 7–6^{(3)} 6–0 | (Italy) Grymalska (Italy) Meccico | |
| April 6 2009 | Šibenik, Croatia; Clay $10,000 | (Italy) Evelyn Mayr; 7–5, 7–6^{(3)} | (Italy) Annalisa Bona | |
| April 6 2009 | Šibenik, Croatia; Clay $10,000 | (Serbia) Mirčić (Serbia) Zorić; 6–0 6–3 | (Slovenia) Obrež (Slovenia) Mika Urbančič | |
| April 6 2009 | Antalya-Belek, Turkey; Hard $10,000 | (Greece) Irini Georgatou; 3–2, ret. | (Ukraine) Katerina Avdiyenko | |
| April 6 2009 | Antalya-Belek, Turkey; Hard $10,000 | (United Kingdom) Fitzpatrick (Denmark) Jensen; 7–6^{(3)}, 2–6, [10–7] | (Georgia (country)) Kvatsabaia (Russia) Tsybysheva | |
| April 13, 2009 | Tessenderlo, Belgium; Clay $25,000 | (Luxembourg) Mandy Minella; 7–5 6–3 | (France) Youlia Fedossova | |
| April 13, 2009 | Tessenderlo, Belgium; Clay $25,000 | (France) Fedossova (France) Pichet; 7–5, 6–3 | (Switzerland) Boffa (Croatia) Jurak | |
| April 13, 2009 | Civitavecchia, Italy; Clay $25,000 | (Slovenia) Polona Hercog; 6–2, 6–4 | (Germany) Andrea Petkovic | |
| April 13, 2009 | Civitavecchia, Italy; Clay $25,000 | (Argentina) Krauth (France) Védy; 6–1, 6–1 | (Belarus) Kustova (Belarus) Poutchek | |
| April 13, 2009 | Osprey, United States; Hard $25,000 | (Canada) Sharon Fichman; 6–4, 6–1 | (Ukraine) Yuliana Fedak | |
| April 13, 2009 | Osprey, United States; Hard $25,000 | (United States) Lee-Waters (United States) Tweedie-Yates; 6–3 6–7 ^{(5)} [12–10] | (Canada) El Tabakh (Austria) Klaffner | |
| April 13, 2009 | Hvar, Croatia; Clay $10,000 | (Poland) Karolina Kosińska; 6–4, 6–3 | (Czech Republic) Tereza Mrdeža | |
| April 13, 2009 | Hvar, Croatia; Clay $10,000 | (Hungary) Jani (Czech Republic) Kubicikova; 6–4, 0–6, [10–6] | (Romania) Bogdan (Czech Republic) Borecka | |
| April 13, 2009 | Antalya-Belek, Turkey; Hard $10,000 | (Greece) Irini Georgatou; 6–3, 6–7^{(5)} 7–5 | (Ukraine) Tetyana Arefyeva | |
| April 13, 2009 | Antalya-Belek, Turkey; Hard $10,000 | (Turkey) Büyükakçay (Turkey) Özgen; 6–4, 6–2 | (Ukraine) Arefyeva (Ukraine) Lytovchenko | |
| April 13, 2009 | Shymkent, Kazakhstan; Clay $10,000 | (Uzbekistan) Albina Khabibulina; 6–7^{(5)}, 6–3, 6–1 | (India) Poojashree Venkatesha | |
| April 13, 2009 | Shymkent, Kazakhstan; Clay $10,000 | No Doubles Final | | |
| April 13, 2009 | Buenos Aires, Argentina; Clay $10,000 | (Argentina) María Irigoyen; 6–3, 6–4 | (Argentina) Mailen Auroux | |
| April 13, 2009 | Buenos Aires, Argentina; Clay $10,000 | (Argentina) Auroux (Argentina) Spiegel; 6–2, 6–2 | (Brazil) Alves (Brazil) Tiene | |
| April 20, 2009 | Dothan, United States; Clay $75,000 | (United States) Shenay Perry; 4–6, 6–1, 6–3 | (United States) Carly Gullickson | |
| April 20, 2009 | Dothan, United States; Clay $75,000 | (United States) Ditty (United States) Gullickson; 2–6, 6–1, [10–6] | (Russia) Bychkova (Russia) Panova | |
| April 20, 2009 | Bari, Italy; Clay $25,000 | (Romania) Alexandra Dulgheru; 6–4 6–4 | (Czech Republic) Sandra Záhlavová | |
| April 20, 2009 | Bari, Italy; Clay $25,000 | (Ukraine) Buryachok (Czech Republic) Voráčová; 5–7, 6–2, [10–5] | (Sweden) Larsson (United Kingdom) Smith | |
| April 20, 2009 | Changwon, South Korea; Hard $25,000 | (United Kingdom) Elena Baltacha; 6–3 6–1 | (Japan) Junri Namigata | |
| April 20, 2009 | Changwon, South Korea; Hard $25,000 | (Chinese Taipei) Chang (Chinese Taipei) Chen; 6–4 6–1 | (United Kingdom) Baltacha (United Kingdom) Elliott | |
| April 20, 2009 | Torrent, Spain; Clay $10,000 | (Spain) Lara Arruabarrena-Vecino; 6–2 6–3 | (Spain) Marta Marrero | |
| April 20, 2009 | Torrent, Spain; Clay $10,000 | (Italy) Caciotti (Italy) Clerico; 7–5, 0–6, [11–9] | (Spain) Arruabarrena-Vecino (Spain) Roset-Franco | |
| April 20, 2009 | Bol, Croatia; Clay $10,000 | (Italy) Valentina Sulpizio; 3–6, 6–3, 6–4 | (Croatia) Tereza Mrdeža | |
| April 20, 2009 | Bol, Croatia; Clay $10,000 | (Czech Republic) Borecka (Thailand) Lertcheewakarn; 6–3 6–3 | (Slovakia) Pochabová (Slovakia) Veresova | |
| April 20, 2009 | Almaty, Kazakhstan; Hard $10,000 | (Ukraine) Tetyana Arefyeva; 6–2 6–1 | (Russia) Daria Kuchmina | |
| April 20, 2009 | Almaty, Kazakhstan; Hard $10,000 | (Ukraine) Arefyeva (Ukraine) Lytovchenko; 6–4 6–4 | (Belarus) Bohush (Russia) Pashkova | |
| April 20, 2009 | Buenos-Aires, Argentina; Clay $10,000 | (Argentina) Veronica Spiegel; 7–5 6–1 | (Brazil) Ana Clara Duarte | |
| April 20, 2009 | Buenos-Aires, Argentina; Clay $10,000 | (Argentina) Sarmenti (Argentina) Yorio; 7–6 ^{(5)} 6–4 | (Brazil) Alves (Brazil) Tiene | |
| April 27, 2009 | Cagnes-sur-Mer, France; Clay $100,000 | (Italy) Maria Elena Camerin; 6–1 6–2 | (Czech Republic) Zuzana Ondrášková | |
| April 27, 2009 | Cagnes-sur-Mer, France; Clay $100,000 | (France) Coin (Canada) Pelletier; 6–4 6–3 | (Argentina) Krauth (Georgia (country)) Tatishvili | |
| April 27, 2009 | Johannesburg, South Africa; Hard $100,000 | (Latvia) Anastasija Sevastova; 6–2 6–2 | (Czech Republic) Eva Hrdinová | |
| April 27, 2009 | Johannesburg, South Africa; Hard $100,000 | (United Kingdom) Cavaday (Ukraine) Tsurenko; 6–2 2–6 [11–9] | (Slovakia) Kučová (Latvia) Sevastova | |
| April 27, 2009 | Charlottesville, Virginia; Clay $50,000 | (United States) Lindsay Lee-Waters; 6–3 7–5 | (Russia) Ekaterina Bychkova | |
| April 27, 2009 | Charlottesville, Virginia; Clay $50,000 | (United States) Gullickson (Australia) Kriz; 7–5 3–6 [10–7] | (United States) Haynes (Russia) Jidkova | |
| April 27, 2009 | Makarska, Croatia; Clay $50,000 | (Germany) Tatjana Malek; 6–1 4–6 6–4 | (Romania) Simona Halep | |
| April 27, 2009 | Makarska, Croatia; Clay $50,000 | (Germany) Malek (Czech Republic) Voráčová; 6–4 5–7 [10–6] | (Czech Republic) Hladíková (Poland) Kosińska | |
| April 27, 2009 | Gifu, Japan; Carpet $50,000 | (Japan) Aiko Nakamura; 6–1 6–4 | (Japan) Tomoko Yonemura | |
| April 27, 2009 | Gifu, Japan; Carpet $50,000 | (Australia) Ferguson (Japan) Nakamura; 6–2 6–1 | (Japan) Doi (Japan) Nara | |
| April 27, 2009 | Bundaberg, Australia; Clay $25,000 | (Russia) Anastassia Rodionova; 7–5 6–0 | (Australia) Olivia Rogowska | |
| April 27, 2009 | Bundaberg, Australia; Clay $25,000 | (Japan) Arai (Switzerland) Riner; 1–6 6–4 [11–9] | (Australia) Holland (Australia) Peers | |
| April 27, 2009 | Namangan, Uzbekistan; Hard $25,000 | (Ukraine) Khrystyna Antoniichuk; 6–0 6–1 | (Ukraine) Tetyana Arefyeva | |
| April 27, 2009 | Namangan, Uzbekistan; Hard $25,000 | (Uzbekistan) Khabibulina (Kyrgyzstan) Palkina; 6–4 6–7(6) [10–5] | (Turkey) Büyükakçay (Turkey) Özgen | |
| April 27, 2009 | Gimcheon, Korea Republic; Hard $25,000 | (South Korea) Jin-A Lee; 6–4 7–5 | (South Korea) So-Jung Kim | |
| April 27, 2009 | Gimcheon, Korea Republic; Hard $25,000 | (Chinese Taipei) Chang (Chinese Taipei) Chen; 6–1 7–5 | (South Korea) Chang (South Korea) Lee | |
| April 27, 2009 | Balikpapan, Indonesia; Hard $25,000 | (Indonesia) Ayu-Fani Damayanti; 7–5 6–3 | (Japan) Erika Sema | |
| April 27, 2009 | Balikpapan, Indonesia; Hard $25,000 | (Indonesia) Basuki (Indonesia) Tedjakusuma; 6–3 6–3 | (United Kingdom) Webley-Smith (Hong Kong) Zhang | |
| April 27, 2009 | Buenos Aires, Argentina; Clay $10,000 | (Argentina) Mailen Auroux; 6–2 6–3 | (Argentina) María Irigoyen | |
| April 27, 2009 | Buenos Aires, Argentina; Clay $10,000 | (Brazil) Alves (Brazil) Tiene; 6–3 6–3 | (Colombia) Castiblanco-Duarte (Chile) Koch Benvenuto | |
| April 27, 2009 | Bournemouth, United Kingdom; Clay $10,000 | (Germany) Svenja Weidemann; 4–6 6–3 6–4 | (Hungary) Tímea Babos | |
| April 27, 2009 | Bournemouth, United Kingdom; Clay $10,000 | (Hungary) Babos (United Kingdom) Cornish w/o | (France) Lechemia (France) Lim | |
| April 27, 2009 | Vic, Spain; Clay $10,000 | (Spain) Beatriz García Vidagany; 2–6 6–2 6–2 | (North Macedonia) Aleksandra Josifoska | |
| April 27, 2009 | Vic, Spain; Clay $10,000 | (Spain) Sánchez-Quintanar (Spain) Santos-Bravo; 7–5 7–5 | (Spain) Costas-Moreira (Spain) Sainz | |
| April 27, 2009 | Brescia, Italy; Clay $10,000 | (Ukraine) Irina Buryachok; 6–3 6–3 | (Italy) Giulia Remondina | |
| April 27, 2009 | Brescia, Italy; Clay $10,000 | (Ukraine) Buryachok (Netherlands) Meddens; 6–4 2–6 [14–12] | (Italy) Pioppo (Italy) Sabino | |

=== May ===
| Week | Tournament | Winner | Runner-up |
|---|---|---|---|
| May 4 2009 | Bucharest, Romania; Clay $100,000 | (Germany) Andrea Petkovic; 6–3 6–2 | (Switzerland) Stefanie Vögele |
| May 4 2009 | Bucharest, Romania; Clay $100,000 | (Romania) Begu (Romania) Halep; 2–6 6–0 [12–10] | (Germany) Görges (Austria) Klemenschits |
| May 4 2009 | Indian Harbour Beach, Florida, United States; Clay $50,000 | (United States) Melanie Oudin; 7–5 5–7 6–2 | (Germany) Laura Siegemund |
| May 4 2009 | Indian Harbour Beach, Florida, United States; Clay $50,000 | (Canada) El Tabakh (Austria) Klaffner; 6–3 3–6 [10–7] | (Ukraine) Luzhanska (United States) Osterloh |
| May 4 2009 | Zagreb, Croatia; Clay $50,000 | (Slovenia) Polona Hercog; 7–5 6–2 | (Slovenia) Maša Zec Peškirič |
| May 4 2009 | Zagreb, Croatia; Clay $50,000 | (Croatia) Martić (Croatia) Tomljanović; 6–3 6–7(4) [10–5] | (Belarus) Milevskaya (Russia) Pivovarova |
| May 4 2009 | Fukuoka, Japan; Carpet $50,000 | (Austria) Nikola Hofmanova; 6–3 6–2 | (Chinese Taipei) Kai-Chen Chang |
| May 4 2009 | Fukuoka, Japan; Carpet $50,000 | (Japan) A Yonemura (Japan) T Yonemura; 6–2 6–7(3) [10–3] | (Japan) Maekawa (Japan) Namigata |
| May 4 2009 | Ipswich, Queensland, Australia; Clay $25,000 | (Russia) Anastassia Rodionova; 6–4 7–5 | (Switzerland) Nicole Riner |
| May 4 2009 | Ipswich, Queensland, Australia; Clay $25,000 | (Japan) Arai (Australia) Rogowska; 6–3, 6–2 | (Australia) Calderwood (Australia) Golds |
| May 4 2009 | Florence, Italy; Clay $25,000 | (Belarus) Darya Kustova; 6–2 6–1 | (Italy) Federica Di Sarra |
| May 4 2009 | Florence, Italy; Clay $25,000 | (France) Laisne (France) Vongsouthi; 6–0, 6–1 | (Slovakia) Boczová (Italy) Clerico |
| May 4 2009 | Tarakan, Indonesia; Hard $10,000 | (Hong Kong) Yang Zi-Jun; 7–5 6–1 | (China) Yang Yi |
| May 4 2009 | Tarakan, Indonesia; Hard $10,000 | (Indonesia) Gumulya (Indonesia) Rompies; 7–6(5) 6–7(4) [10–7] | (Japan) Koshino (Japan) Sema |
| May 4 2009 | Edinburgh, United Kingdom; Hard $10,000 | (Hungary) Tímea Babos; 6–4, 6–7 (3), 7–6 (8) | (United Kingdom) Naomi Broady |
| May 4 2009 | Edinburgh, United Kingdom; Hard $10,000 | (United Kingdom) Naomi Broady (United Kingdom) Elizabeth Thomas; 3–6, 6–3, [10–7] | (Norway) Helene Auensen (Belarus) Volha Duko |
| May 4 2009 | Wiesbaden, Germany; Clay $10,000 | (Germany) Julia Babilon; 6–1 6–2 | (Croatia) Darija Jurak |
| May 4 2009 | Wiesbaden, Germany; Clay $10,000 | (Netherlands) Leonie Mekel (Netherlands) Pauline Wong; 6–1, 6–3 | (Romania) Cadanțu (Romania) Stuparu |
| May 4 2009 | Badolona, Spain; Clay $10,000 | (Spain) Marta Marrero; 6–1 6–2 | (Ukraine) Yevgeniya Kryvoruchko |
| May 4 2009 | Badolona, Spain; Clay $10,000 | (Italy) Benedetta Davato (Spain) Cristina Sanchez-Quintanar; 6–3, 6–4 | (Spain) Rebeca Bou Nogueiro (Spain) Sheila Solsona Carcasona |
| May 4 2009 | Mostar, Bosnia and Herzegovina; Clay $10,000 | (Croatia) Indire Akiki; 6–0 6–1 | (Italy) Martina Caciotti |
| May 4 2009 | Mostar, Bosnia and Herzegovina; Clay $10,000 | (Croatia) Indire Akiki (Serbia) Milana Špremo; 6–0, 6–2 | (Slovakia) Kristina Beznaková (Czech Republic) Barbora Krtičková |
| May 4 2009 | Warsaw, Poland; Clay $10,000 | (Czech Republic) Iveta Gerlová; 6–0 6–1 | (Poland) Katarzyna Kawa |
| May 4 2009 | Warsaw, Poland; Clay $10,000 | (Czech Republic) Iveta Gerlová (Poland) Karolina Kosińska; 6–2, 6–1 | (Poland) Katarzyna Kaleta (Poland) Katarzyna Kawa |

=== June ===
| Week | Tournament | Winner | Runner-up |
|---|---|---|---|
| June 1 2009 | Nottingham, United Kingdom; Grass $50,000 | (Italy) Maria Elena Camerin; 6–2 4–6 6–1 | (Switzerland) Stefanie Vögele |
| June 1 2009 | Nottingham, United Kingdom; Grass $50,000 | (United States) Glatch (South Africa) Grandin; 6–3 2–6 [10–7] | (Greece) Daniilidou (Japan) Fujiwara |
| June 1 2009 | Sarajevo, Bosnia and Herzegovina; Clay $25,000 | (Croatia) Ivana Lisjak; 6–0 7–6(10) | (Serbia) Ana Jovanović |
| June 1 2009 | Sarajevo, Bosnia and Herzegovina; Clay $25,000 | (Denmark) Jensen (Poland) Kosińska; 7–6(4) 6–2 | (Russia) Kalabina (Russia) Poltoratskaya |
| June 1 2009 | Komoro, Japan; Clay $25,000 | (Japan) Yurika Sema; 6–3 1–6 6–4 | (Japan) Kurumi Nara |
| June 1 2009 | Komoro, Japan; Clay $25,000 | (China) Xu (China) Shuai; 6–2 6–1 | (Japan) Oka (Thailand) Wongteanchai |
| June 1 2009 | Gimhae, South Korea; Hard $25,000 | (China) Xinyun Han; 6–1 6–3 | (Australia) Shannon Golds |
| June 1 2009 | Gimhae, South Korea; Hard $25,000 | (Indonesia) Basuki (Indonesia) Tedjakusuma; 7–5 6–1 | (China) Liang (China) Sun |
| June 1 2009 | Galatina, Italy; Clay $25,000 | (Spain) Eva Fernández Brugués; 3–6 6–3 6–2 | (Georgia (country)) Margalita Chakhnashvili |
| June 1 2009 | Galatina, Italy; Clay $25,000 | (Russia) Bovina (Russia) Kulikova; 6–2 6–1 | (Spain) Garcia-Vidagany (Argentina) Salerni |
| June 1 2009 | Bukhara, Uzbekistan; Hard $25,000 | (Russia) Arina Rodionova; 3–6 6–3 6–2 | (Austria) Nikola Hofmanova |
| June 1 2009 | Bukhara, Uzbekistan; Hard $25,000 | (Sweden) Brazhnikova (Russia) Sirotkina; 3–6 6–4 [11–9] | (Kyrgyzstan) Palkina (Russia) Ar Rodionova |
| June 1 2009 | Tel Aviv, Israel; Hard $10,000 | (Georgia (country)) Manana Shapakidze; 6–2 1–6 7–5 | (Belgium) Sophie Cornerotte |
| June 1 2009 | Tel Aviv, Israel; Hard $10,000 | (Russia) Lazareva (Israel) Mishor; 4–6 7–5 [16–14] | (Israel) Masuri (Israel) Tour |
| June 1 2009 | New Delhi, India; Hard $10,000 | (India) Ankita Bhambri; 6–2 6–3 | (China) Chun-Yan He |
| June 1 2009 | New Delhi, India; Hard $10,000 | (India) A Bhambri (India) S Bhambri; 6–4 2–6 [10–1] | (South Korea) Seo (South Korea) Shin |
| June 8 2009 | Marseille, France; Clay $100,000 | (Romania) Iona-Raluca Olaru; 6–7(4) 7–5 6–4 | (Slovenia) Maša Zec Peškirič |
| June 8 2009 | Marseille, France; Clay $100,000 | (Italy) Garbin (Argentina) Salerni; 6–7(4) 6–3 [10–7] | (Switzerland) Bacsinszky (Russia) Bovina |
| June 8 2009 | Zlín, Czech Republic; Clay $50,000 | (Slovenia) Polona Hercog; 6–3 6–1 | (Slovakia) Zuzana Kučová |
| June 8 2009 | Zlín, Czech Republic; Clay $50,000 | (Slovakia) K Kučová (Slovakia) Z Kučová; 6–3 6–4 | (Czech Republic) Fraňková (Germany) Klaschka |
| June 8 2009 | Szczecin, Poland; Clay $25,000 | (Germany) Stephanie Gehrlein; 6–4 6–0 | (Czech Republic) Andrea Hlaváčková |
| June 8 2009 | Szczecin, Poland; Clay $25,000 | (Czech Republic) Paštiková (Slovakia) Tvarošková; 6–2 7–5 | (United States) McHale (United States) Muhammed |
| June 8 2009 | El Paso, Texas, United States; Hard $25,000 | (Canada) Valérie Tétreault; 6–4 6–3 | (United States) Mashona Washington |
| June 8 2009 | El Paso, Texas, United States; Hard $25,000 | (United States) Fusano (India) Uberoi; 6–3 7–5 | (Brazil) Alves (Ukraine) Luzhanska |
| June 8 2009 | Qarshi, Uzbekistan; Hard $25,000 | (Greece) Irini Georgatou; 6–1 3–1 Retired | (Ukraine) Khrystyna Antoniichuk |
| June 8 2009 | Qarshi, Uzbekistan; Hard $25,000 | (Ukraine) Antoniychuk (Georgia (country)) Kalashnikova; 5–7 6–0 [10–6] | (Turkey) Büyükakçay (Turkey) Özgen |
| June 8 2009 | Campobasso, Italy; Clay $25,000 | (Ukraine) Irina Buryachok; 6–4 6–4 | (Italy) Nathalie Viérin |
| June 8 2009 | Campobasso, Italy; Clay $25,000 | (Argentina) Cravero (Portugal) Piedade; 6–3 6–4 | (Italy) Floris (Italy) Sulpizio |
| June 8 2009 | Apeldoorn, Netherlands; Clay $10,000 | (France) Natalie Piquion; 6–3 6–2 | (Netherlands) Kiki Bertens |
| June 8 2009 | Apeldoorn, Netherlands; Clay $10,000 | (Netherlands) Hogenkamp (Netherlands) Van Uitert; 6–3 6–7(9) [10–8] | (Serbia) Kozić (Netherlands) Schoofs |
| June 8 2009 | Tokyo, Japan; Hard $10,000 | (Japan) Erika Sema; 6–4 6–0 | (Japan) Erika Takao |
| June 8 2009 | Tokyo, Japan; Hard $10,000 | (Japan) Oka (Japan) Tanaka; 7–6(6) 6–0 | (Japan) Arai (Japan) Koshino |
| June 15 2009 | Montpellier, France; Clay $25,000 | (France) Anais Laurendon; 6–3 6–2 | (Argentina) Maria-Emilia Salerni |
| June 15 2009 | Montpellier, France; Clay $25,000 | (Ukraine) Beygelzimer (Germany) Siegemund; 6–4 6–1 | (Switzerland) Boffa (United States) Tweedie-Yates |
| June 15 2009 | Padova, Italy; Clay $25,000 | (Spain) Eva Fernández Brugués; 6–2 1–6 7–5 | (Italy) Nathalie Viérin |
| June 15 2009 | Padova, Italy; Clay $25,000 | (Hungary) Kapros / (Austria) Klemenschits; 7–6(4) 6–1 | (Italy) Pioppo (Italy) Sulpizio |
| June 15 2009 | Pattaya, Thailand; Hard $10,000 | (Indonesia) Ayu-Fani Damayanti; 7–6(3) 6–4 | (Chinese Taipei) Hwang I-hsuan |
| June 15 2009 | Pattaya, Thailand; Hard $10,000 | (Chinese Taipei) Hwang (Chinese Taipei) Juan; 6–2 6–4 | (Indonesia) Damayanti (Indonesia) Tananta |
| June 15 2009 | Melilla, Spain; Hard $10,000 | (Italy) Giulia Gasparri; 7–5 6–4 | (Bulgaria) Aleksandrina Naydenova |
| June 15 2009 | Melilla, Spain; Hard $10,000 | (Slovenia) Jakupovic (Slovakia) Zlochová; 6–2 6–4 | (Switzerland) Kovarčíková (Belgium) Lobbinger |
| June 15 2009 | Lenzerheide, Switzerland; Clay $10,000 | (Netherlands) Michelle Gerards; 6–2 7–5 | (Switzerland) Amra Sadiković |
| June 15 2009 | Lenzerheide, Switzerland; Clay $10,000 | (Netherlands) Gerards (Netherlands) Koek; 6–3 6–3 | (Switzerland) Knoll (Switzerland) Sadiković |
| June 15 2009 | Istanbul, Turkey; Hard $10,000 | (Turkey) Çağla Büyükakçay; 6–2 6–3 | (Russia) Galina Fokina |
| June 15 2009 | Istanbul, Turkey; Hard $10,000 | (Russia) Fokina (Russia) Morgina; 6–4 4–6 [10–8] | (Turkey) Büyükakçay (Turkey) Özgen |

=== July ===
| Week | Tournament | Winner | Runner-up |
|---|---|---|---|
| July 6 2009 | Biarritz, France; Clay $100,000 | (Germany) Julia Görges; 7–5 6–0 | (Belarus) Ekaterina Dzehalevich |
| July 6 2009 | Biarritz, France; Clay $100,000 | (Chinese Taipei) Chan (Russia) Rodionova; 6–3 2–6 [10–7] | (Uzbekistan) Amanmuradova (Belarus) Kustova |
| July 6 2009 | Zagreb, Croatia; Clay $75,000 | (Czech Republic) Sandra Záhlavová; 6–1 7–6(4) | (Latvia) Anastasija Sevastova |
| July 6 2009 | Zagreb, Croatia; Clay $75,000 | (Croatia) Jurak (Czech Republic) Voráčová; 6–2 7–5 | (Russia) Chalova (Russia) Poltoratskaya |
| July 6 2009 | Grapevine, Texas, United States; Hard $50,000 | (Canada) Valérie Tétreault; 2–6 7–6(6) 7–6(1) | (Canada) Stéphanie Dubois |
| July 6 2009 | Grapevine, Texas, United States; Hard $50,000 | (United States) Lee-Waters (United States) Zalameda; 7–6(5) 6–3 | (United States) Couts (Canada) Tetreault |
| July 6 2009 | A Coruña, Spain; Hard $25,000 | (Portugal) Neuza Silva; 6–3 6–1 | (Russia) Vesna Manasieva |
| July 6 2009 | A Coruña, Spain; Hard $25,000 | (Argentina) Irigoyen (Argentina) Molinero; 6–2 6–4 | (Russia) Manasieva (Belarus) Milevskaya |
| July 6 2009 | Tokyo, Japan; Carpet $10,000 | (Japan) Misaki Doi; 6–4 6–1 | (Japan) Sachie Ishizu |
| July 6 2009 | Tokyo, Japan; Carpet $10,000 | (Japan) Arai (Japan) Tanaka; 7–5 3–6 [13–11] | (Japan) Ito (Japan) Taira |
| July 6 2009 | Shenzhen, China; Hard $10,000 | (China) Zheng Saisai; 7–5 6–4 | (Uzbekistan) Sabina Sharipova |
| July 6 2009 | Shenzhen, China; Hard $10,000 | (China) Lu (China) Ou; 6–1 6–1 | (China) Hu / (Japan) Yuan |

== Retired players ==
| Player | Born | Highest ranking | | ITF titles | |
| Player | Born | Singles | Doubles | Singles | Doubles |
|---|---|---|---|---|---|
| (France) Kildine Chevalier | 30 June 1980 | 218 | 172 | 8 | 22 |
| (Malaysia) Khoo Chin-bee | 4 May 1977 | 329 | 209 | 1 | 9 |
| (Austria) Daniela Kix | 11 November 1984 | 190 | 341 | 3 | 2 |
| (Belgium) Caroline Maes | 9 November 1982 | 151 | 135 | 8 | 9 |
| (Czech Republic) Milena Nekvapilová | 9 May 1977 | 214 | 146 | 4 | 21 |
| (India) Sunitha Rao | 27 October 1985 | 144 | 108 | 0 | 8 |
| (New Zealand) Shelley Stephens | 29 July 1978 | 249 | 133 | 2 | 21 |
