= 2008 New Delhi ITF Open =

- 2008 New Delhi ITF Open

Final
- Champion: (Belarus) Ekaterina Dzehalevich
- Runner-up: (Belgium) Yanina Wickmayer
- Score: 2-6, 6-3, 6-2

Events
Singles	Doubles
New Delhi ITF Open

The 2008 New Delhi ITF Open, a women's tennis tournament within the 2008 ITF Women's Circuit, was the first and only edition of the tournament. The singles event was won by Ekaterina Dzehalevich of Belarus, an unseeded player, who defeated Yanina Wickmayer in the final with a score of 2–6, 6–3, 6–2. In the doubles final, the Chinese pair Ji Chunmei and Sun Shengnan defeated Sunitha Rao (India) and Aurélie Védy (France) by 2–6, 6-2 [10-4].

== Singles event - details ==
=== Seeds ===
1. (Slovenia) Andreja Klepač (first round)
2. (France) Mathilde Johansson (second round)
3. (Russia) Vesna Manasieva (first round, retired)
4. (Belgium) Yanina Wickmayer (final)
5. (Estonia) Margit Rüütel (semifinals)
6. (South Africa) Chanelle Scheepers (quarterfinals)
7. (United States) Sunitha Rao (quarterfinals)
8. (United Kingdom) Naomi Cavaday (semifinals)

=== Key ===
- Q = Qualifier
- WC = Wild card
- LL = Lucky loser
- Alt = Alternate
- ITF = ITF entry
- PR = Protected ranking
- SR = Special ranking
- SE = Special exempt
- JE = Junior exempt
- JR = Junior Accelerator Programme entrant
- CO = College Accelerator Programme entrant
- NG = Next Gen Accelerator Program entrant
- w/o = Walkover
- r = Retired
- d = Defaulted

==== Finals ====
Semifinals
8	(United Kingdom) Naomi Cavaday	1	3
4	(Belgium) Yanina Wickmayer	6	6
5	(Estonia) Margit Rüütel	4	6	5
(Belarus) Ekaterina Dzehalevich	6	0	7

Final
4	(Belgium) Yanina Wickmayer	6	3	2
(Belarus) Ekaterina Dzehalevich	2	6	6

==== Top half ====
First round
1	(Slovenia) A Klepač	1	2
(Czech Republic) A Hlaváčková	6	6
(Romania) M Mihalache	3	3
(Germany) C Klaschka	6	6
(India) S Uberoi	3	3
Q	(Thailand) M Tangphong	6	6
(Indonesia) S Gumulya	2	0
8	(United Kingdom) N Cavaday	6	6
4	(Belgium) Y Wickmayer	7^{7}	6
(Uzbekistan) I Tulyaganova	6^{5}	4
Q	(Ukraine) K Antoniychuk	3	7	6
Q	(Thailand) S Viratprasert	6	5	1
WC	(Croatia) I Lisjak	3	0	r
WC	(India) A Bhambri	6	1
(Czech Republic) V Chvojková	4	7	4
6	(South Africa) C Scheepers	6	5	6

Second round
(Czech Republic) A Hlaváčková	7	3	2
(Germany) C Klaschka	5	6	6
Q	(Thailand) M Tangphong	3	1
8	(United Kingdom) N Cavaday	6	6
4	(Belgium) Y Wickmayer	7^{7}	6
Q	(Ukraine) K Antoniychuk	6^{5}	1
WC	(India) A Bhambri	7	3	2
6	(South Africa) C Scheepers	5	6	6

Quarterfinals
(Germany) C Klaschka	6	1	4
8	(United Kingdom) N Cavaday	3	6	6
4	(Belgium) Y Wickmayer	6^{5}	6	6
6	(South Africa) C Scheepers	7^{7}	3	3

Semifinals
8	(United Kingdom) N Cavaday	1	3
4	(Belgium) Y Wickmayer	6	6

==== Bottom half ====
First round
5	(Estonia) M Rüütel	6	6
WC	(India) R Chakravarthi	0	3
(Slovakia) L Tvarošková	7^{7}	5	6
Q	(Italy) L Sabino	6^{5}	7	2
(Hungary) A Kapros	7^{7}	7^{7}
(Latvia) A Sevastova	6^{5}	6^{4}
WC	(India) I Lakhani	6
3	(Russia) V Manasieva	3	r
7	(United States) S Rao	6	6
(Kyrgyzstan) K Palkina	4	4
(Romania) M Buzărnescu	1	5
(Serbia) T Mirčić	6	7
(Belarus) E Dzehalevich	6	6
(Italy) C Dentoni	4	4
(Russia) A Poltoratskaya	2	3
2	(France) M Johansson	6	6

Second round
5	(Estonia) M Rüütel	5	6	6
(Slovakia) L Tvarošková	7	4	1
(Hungary) A Kapros	6	6
WC	(India) I Lakhani	2	4
7	(United States) S Rao	6	6
(Serbia) T Mirčić	1	3
(Belarus) E Dzehalevich	6	6
2	(France) M Johansson	3	1

Quarterfinals
5	(Estonia) M Rüütel	6	6
(Hungary) A Kapros	4	3
7	(United States) S Rao	5	2
(Belarus) E Dzehalevich	7	6

Semifinals
5	(Estonia) M Rüütel	4	6	5
(Belarus) E Dzehalevich	6	0	7
