= Tatsiana Kapshai =

Belarusian tennis player

- Country (sports): Belarus
- Born: 9 November 1988 (age 36)
- Retired: 2008
- Prize money: $13,847

Singles
- Career record: 35–64
- Career titles: 0
- Highest ranking: No. 665 (18 September 2006)

Doubles
- Career record: 39–51
- Career titles: 3 ITF
- Highest ranking: No. 333 (20 March 2006)

Tatsiana Kapshai (born 9 November 1988) is a former professional Belarusian tennis player who has specialized in doubles.

On 18 September 2006, she reached her career-high singles ranking of world No. 665. On 20 March 2006, she peaked at No. 333 in the doubles rankings. She has won Three doubles titles on the ITF Women's Circuit.

== Career ==
In September 2005, she won the doubles title with her partner, compatriot Ekaterina Dzehalevich, at a $25k event in Tbilisi. They defeated Polish Karolina Kosińska and Belarusian Tatsiana Uvarova in the final.

== ITF Circuit finals ==
=== Doubles (3–2) ===
Outcome	No.	Date	Tournament	Surface	Partner	Opponents	Score
Winner	1.	20 March 2005	Amiens, France	Clay	(Czech Republic) Renata Voráčová	(Netherlands) Sanne van den Biggelaar (Netherlands) Suzanne van Hartingsveldt	2–6, 7–6^{(5)}, 6–4
Winner	2.	24 September 2005	Tbilisi, Georgia	Clay	(Belarus) Ekaterina Dzehalevich	(Poland) Karolina Kosińska (Belarus) Tatsiana Uvarova	6–0, 7–5
Runner-up	1.	12 March 2006	Minsk, Belarus	Carpet (i)	(Belarus) Ekaterina Dzehalevich	(Belarus) Ima Bohush (Belarus) Darya Kustova	6–1, 3–6, 4–6
Runner-up	2.	24 June 2007	Montpellier, France	Clay	(Ukraine) Kateryna Polunina	(France) Émilie Bacquet (France) Nadege Vergos	7–5, 4–6, 3–6
Winner	3.	21 June 2008	Turin, Italy	Clay	(Russia) Alexandra Razumova	(Italy) Stefania Chieppa (Italy) Giulia Gatto-Monticone	6–7^{(4)}, 6–2, [10–8]

== Ranking history ==
Year	Singles	Doubles
2004	1042	856
2005	970	382
2006	762	491
2007	982	464
2008	—	623
