= Yulia Kolesnikova =

Russian tennis player

- Native name: Юлия Колесникова
- Country (sports): Russia
- Residence: Stupino, Russia
- Born: 22 February 1990 (age 35); Namangan, Soviet Union
- Turned pro: 2005
- Retired: 2015
- Plays: Right-handed (two-handed backhand)

Singles
- Career titles: 1 ITF
- Highest ranking: No. 513 (05 March 2007)

Doubles
- Career titles: 2 ITF
- Highest ranking: No. 358 (29 January 2007)

Yulia Kolesnikova (née Solonitskaya Russian: Юлия Колесникова born 22 February 1990) is a Russian tennis player. Kolesnikova has a career-high singles ranking by the WTA of world No. 513 and a doubles ranking of No. 358. She won one singles titles and two doubles titles on tournaments of the ITF Circuit.

== Career ==
In 2006, they played in the final of the Junior Fed Cup for Russia, together with Kolesnikova Lykina and Pavlyuchenkova, in Barcelona, Spain. in March 2006 with her partner, Anastasia Pavlyuchenkova, in St. Petersburg, Russia. Participated in the St. Petersburg Ladies Trophy tennis tournament. she won the first championship of his career.

== ITF Circuit finals ==
=== Singles: 2 (1 titles, 1 runner-up) ===
Legend $25,000 tournaments $10,000 tournaments	Finals by surface Hard (0–0) Clay (1–1) Grass (0–0) Carpet (0–0)

Result	W–L	Date	Tournament	Tier	Surface	Opponent	Score
Loss	0–1	Jul 2006	ITF Zhukovsky, Russia	10,000	Clay	(Russia) Anna Lapushchenkova	6–1, 5–7, 5–7
Win	1–1	Sep 2006	ITF Baku, Azerbaijan	10,000	Clay	(Georgia (country)) Sofia Shapatava	6–4, 6–1

=== Doubles: 4 (2 titles, 2 runner-ups) ===
Legend $25,000 tournaments $10,000 tournaments	Finals by surface Hard (0–1) Clay (2–1) Grass (0–0) Carpet (0–0)

Result	W–L	Date	Tournament	Tier	Surface	Partner	Opponents	Score
Win	1–0	Mar 2006	Saint Petersburg, Russia	25,000	Hard (i)	(Russia) Anastasia Pavlyuchenkova	(Ukraine) Yuliya Beygelzimer (Russia) Alla Kudryavtseva	6–1, 6–4
Loss	1–1	Aug 2006	ITF Moscow, Russia	10,000	Clay	(Russia) Anastasia Pivovarova	(Russia) Anastasia Poltoratskaya (Australia) Arina Rodionova	0–6, 2–6
Win	2–1	Sep 2006	ITF Tbilisi, Georgia	10,000	Hard	(Kazakhstan) Amina Rakhim	(Russia) Varvara Galanina (Armenia) Liudmila Nikoyan	7–5, 6–1
Loss	2–2	Nov 2006	ITF Ramat HaSharon, Israel	10,000	Hard	(Russia) Anastasia Poltoratskaya	(Netherlands) Marlot Meddens (Netherlands) Nicole Thyssen	3–6, 1–6
