= 2008 Fed Cup Europe/Africa Zone Group I – Pool C =

Group C of the 2008 Fed Cup Europe/Africa Zone Group I was one of four pools in the Europe/Africa Zone Group I of the 2008 Fed Cup. Four teams competed in a round robin competition, with the top team and the bottom team proceeding to their respective sections of the play-offs: the top team played for advancement to the World Group II Play-offs, while the bottom team faced potential relegation to Group II.

		(Belarus) BLR	(Sweden) SWE	(Slovenia) SLO	(Georgia (country)) GEO	RR; W–L	Set; W–L	Game; W–L	Standings
24	Belarus		1–2	3–0	3–0	2–1	14–6	98–68	2
29	Sweden	2–1		3–0	3–0	3–0	16–3	108–60	1
37	Slovenia	0–3	0–3		2–0	1–2	5–14	39–75	3
49	Georgia	0–3	0–3	0–2		0–3	4–16	39–81	4

== Belarus vs. Georgia ==
Belarus
3
SYMA Sportközpont, Budapest, Hungary
30 January 2008
Taraflex carpet (indoors)

Georgia
0

			1	2	3
1	(Belarus) (Georgia (country))	Darya Kustova; Sofia Kvatsabaia	7; 5	6; 2
2	(Belarus) (Georgia (country))	Olga Govortsova; Oksana Kalashnikova	6; 2	3; 6	6; 3
3	(Belarus) (Georgia (country))	Darya Kustova / Tatiana Poutchek; Ekaterine Gorgodze / Tatia Mikadze	6; 0	6; 0

== Sweden vs. Slovenia ==
Sweden
3
SYMA Sportközpont, Budapest, Hungary
30 January 2008
Taraflex carpet (indoors)

Slovenia
0

			1	2	3
1	(Sweden) (Slovenia)	Johanna Larsson; Maša Zec-Peškirič	6; 3	6; 3
2	(Sweden) (Slovenia)	Sofia Arvidsson; Andreja Klepač	6; 2	6; 1
3	(Sweden) (Slovenia)	Sofia Arvidsson / Johanna Larsson; Andreja Klepač / Maša Zec-Peškirič	6; 4	7^{7} 6^{4}

== Belarus vs. Slovenia ==
Belarus
3
SYMA Sportközpont, Budapest, Hungary
31 January 2008
Taraflex carpet (indoors)

Slovenia
0

			1	2	3
1	(Belarus) (Slovenia)	Darya Kustova; Maša Zec-Peškirič	6; 3	6; 3
2	(Belarus) (Slovenia)	Olga Govortsova; Andreja Klepač	2; 6	6; 1	6; 3
3	(Belarus) (Slovenia)	Ima Bohush / Tatiana Poutchek; Polona Hercog / Maša Zec-Peškirič	6; 1	6; 3

== Sweden vs. Georgia ==
Sweden
3
SYMA Sportközpont, Budapest, Hungary
31 January 2008
Taraflex carpet (indoors)

Georgia
0

			1	2	3
1	(Sweden) (Georgia (country))	Johanna Larsson; Ekaterine Gorgodze	4; 6	6; 1	6; 1
2	(Sweden) (Georgia (country))	Sofia Arvidsson; Oksana Kalashnikova	6; 4	7; 5
3	(Sweden) (Georgia (country))	Sofia Arvidsson / Johanna Larsson; Sofia Kvatsabaia / Tatia Mikadze	6; 0	6; 4

== Belarus vs. Sweden ==
Belarus
1
SYMA Sportközpont, Budapest, Hungary
1 February 2008
Taraflex carpet (indoors)

Sweden
2

			1	2	3
1	(Belarus) (Sweden)	Darya Kustova; Johanna Larsson	3; 6	1; 6
2	(Belarus) (Sweden)	Olga Govortsova; Sofia Arvidsson	2; 6	2; 6
3	(Belarus) (Sweden)	Ima Bohush / Tatiana Poutchek; Michaela Johansson / Nadja Roma	6; 4	6; 2

== Slovenia vs. Georgia ==
Slovenia
2
SYMA Sportközpont, Budapest, Hungary
1 February 2008
Taraflex carpet (indoors)

Georgia
0

			1	2	3
1	(Slovenia) (Georgia (country))	Polona Hercog; Ekaterine Gorgodze	6^{3} 7^{7}	7^{7} 6^{5}	7; 5
2	(Slovenia) (Georgia (country))	Andreja Klepač; Oksana Kalashnikova	6; 1	5; 7	6; 3
3	(Slovenia) (Georgia (country))					not played
