= Anna Lapushchenkova =

Russian tennis player (born 1986)

Anna Lapushchenkova Анна Лапущенкова
- Country (sports): Russia
- Born: 24 October 1986 (age 39) Moscow, Soviet Union
- Height: 1.72 m (5 ft 8 in)
- Plays: Right (two-handed backhand)
- Prize money: $293,618

Singles
- Career record: 186–114
- Career titles: 11 ITF
- Highest ranking: No. 93 (24 May 2010)

Grand Slam singles results
- Australian Open: Q3 (2009)
- French Open: Q3 (2008)
- Wimbledon: 1R (2010)
- US Open: Q3 (2008, 2009)

Doubles
- Career record: 41–41
- Career titles: 1 ITF
- Highest ranking: No. 157 (9 March 2009)

Anna Alexandrovna Lapushchenkova (Анна Александровна Лапущенкова; born 24 October 1986) is a Russian former tennis player.

== Career ==
Lapushchenkova began competing occasionally on the ITF Women's Circuit in October 2002, shortly before her 16th birthday. She started to compete regularly early in 2005; and after at first seeming to reach a plateau around world No. 300 in the first half of 2007. She had risen rapidly to No. 140 in January 2008, and to a career-high of No. 93 in May 2010.

She won five $50k titles, one $75k, two $25k, and three $10k titles, and reached the final of one $100k event. She has also beaten several top 100-calibre players at lesser events and in qualifying rounds for WTA Tour events.

== ITF Circuit finals ==
Legend
$100,000 tournaments
$75,000 tournaments
$50,000 tournaments
$25,000 tournaments
$10,000 tournaments

=== Singles: 18 (11 titles, 7 runner-ups) ===
Result	No.	Date	Tournament	Surface	Opponent	Score
Loss	1.	12 March 2006	ITF Minsk, Belarus	Carpet (i)	(Ukraine) Galyna Kosyk	1–6, 6–7
Loss	2.	2 July 2006	ITF Kharkiv, Ukraine	Clay	(Ukraine) Veronika Kapshay	6–4, 2–6, 1–6
Win	1.	9 July 2006	ITF Zhukovsky, Russia	Clay	(Russia) Yulia Solonitskaya	1–6, 7–5, 7–5
Win	2.	23 September 2006	ITF Tbilisi, Georgia	Hard	(Kazakhstan) Amina Rakhim	7–6^{(7–0)}, 6–2
Win	3.	11 August 2007	ITF Moscow, Russia	Clay	(Kyrgyzstan) Ksenia Palkina	6–4, 6–3
Win	4.	19 August 2007	ITF Penza, Russia	Clay	(Ukraine) Kristina Antoniychuk	6–4, 6–2
Loss	3.	25 August 2007	ITF Moscow, Russia	Clay	(Russia) Anastasia Pivovarova	3–6, 4–6
Win	5.	1 September 2007	ITF Moscow, Russia	Clay	(Ukraine) Galyna Kosyk	6–3, 6–1
Loss	4.	28 October 2007	ITF Podolsk, Russia	Hard (i)	(Russia) Evgeniya Rodina	1–6, 3–6
Loss	5.	25 November 2007	ITF Poitiers, France	Hard (i)	(Poland) Marta Domachowska	5–7, 0–6
Loss	6.	22 March 2008	ITF St. Petersburg, Russia	Hard (i)	(Slovakia) Magdaléna Rybáriková	4–6, 2–6
Win	6.	10 August 2008	ITF Moscow, Russia	Clay	(Hungary) Anikó Kapros	5–1 ret.
Loss	7.	5 April 2009	ITF Khanty-Mansiysk, Russia	Carpet (i)	(Russia) Evgeniya Rodina	3–6, 2–6
Win	7.	15 November 2009	ITF Minsk, Belarus	Hard (i)	(Ukraine) Lyudmyla Kichenok	5–7, 7–6^{(7–3)}, 6–2
Win	8.	7 March 2010	ITF Minsk, Belarus	Hard (i)	(Ukraine) Lesia Tsurenko	6–1, 3–6, 7–6^{(7–2)}
Win	9.	28 March 2010	ITF Moscow, Russia	Hard (i)	(Russia) Elena Kulikova	6–4, 6–2
Win	10.	4 April 2010	ITF Khanty-Mansiysk	Carpet (i)	(Ukraine) Lyudmyla Kichenok	6–2, 6–2
Win	11.	15 August 2010	Tatarstan Open, Russia	Hard	(Russia) Vitalia Diatchenko	6–1, 2–6, 7–6^{(7–4)}

=== Doubles: 5 (1 title, 4 runner-ups) ===
Result	No.	Date	Tournament	Surface	Partner	Opponents	Score
Loss	1.	Jul 2006	ITF Kharkiv, Ukraine	Clay	(Ukraine) Galyna Kosyk	(Russia) Ekaterina Afinogenova (Russia) Vasilisa Davydova	1–6, 5–7
Loss	2.	Aug 2007	ITF Moscow, Russia	Clay	(Russia) Vasilisa Davydova	(Russia) Tatiana Kotelnikova (Russia) Maria Zharkova	4–6, 6–3, 3–6
Loss	3.	Dec 2007	Dubai Challenge, UAE	Hard	(Ukraine) Yuliana Fedak	(New Zealand) Marina Erakovic (Romania) Monica Niculescu	6–7, 4–6
Win	1.	Mar 2008	ITF Minsk, Belarus	Carpet (i)	(Ukraine) Yuliya Beygelzimer	(Belarus) Ima Bohush (Belarus) Ksenia Milevskaya	6–4, 7–5
Loss	4.	Jun 2008	Open de Marseille, France	Clay	(Ukraine) Viktoriya Kutuzova	(Romania) Ágnes Szatmári (France) Aurélie Védy	4–6, 3–6
