= Tatsiana Uvarova =

Belarusian tennis player

- Country (sports): Belarus
- Born: 25 July 1985 (age 39)
- Turned pro: 2000
- Retired: 2007
- Prize money: $39,006

Singles
- Career record: 112–66
- Career titles: 2 ITF
- Highest ranking: No. 222 (29 August 2005)

Doubles
- Career record: 35–36
- Career titles: 2 ITF
- Highest ranking: No. 201 (3 October 2005)

Tatsiana Uvarova (born 25 July 1985) is a former professional Belarusian tennis player.

Her career-high WTA rankings are 222 in singles and 201 in doubles, both achieved in 2005. In her career, Uvarova won two singles and two doubles titles on the ITF Women's Circuit.

Playing for Belarus Fed Cup team, she has a win–loss record of 3–1.

Tatsiana Uvarova retired from tennis before the 2007 season.

== ITF Circuit finals ==
$50,000 tournaments
$25,000 tournaments
$10,000 tournaments

=== Singles (2–2) ===
| Result | Date | Tier | Tournament | Surface | Opponent | Score |
|---|---|---|---|---|---|---|
| Loss | 8 July 2002 | 10,000 | ITF İstanbul, Turkey | Clay | (Belarus) Elena Yaryshka | 6–3, 3–6, 5–7 |
| Loss | 24 March 2003 | 25,000 | ITF Saint Petersburg, Russia | Hard (i) | (Israel) Evgenia Linetskaya | 7–5, 4–6, 4–6 |
| Win | 20 October 2003 | 25,000 | ITF Opole, Poland | Carpet (i) | (Poland) Marta Domachowska | 6–4, 3–6, 6–4 |
| Win | 6 June 2005 | 25,000 | Grado Tennis Cup, Italy | Clay | (China) Yuan Meng | 6–4, 6–4 |

=== Doubles (2–3) ===
| Result | Date | Tier | Tournament | Surface | Partner | Opponents | Score |
|---|---|---|---|---|---|---|---|
| Loss | 5 November 2001 | 10,000 | ITF Minsk, Belarus | Carpet (i) | (Belarus) Darya Kustova | (Russia) Anna Bastrikova (Russia) Vera Dushevina | 5–7, 6–3, 0–6 |
| Loss | 28 October 2002 | 10,000 | ITF Minsk, Belarus | Carpet (i) | (Russia) Olga Puchkova | (Russia) Daria Chemarda (Russia) Vera Dushevina | 1–6, 4–6 |
| Win | 3 October 2004 | 25,000 | Open Nantes Atlantique, France | Hard (i) | (France) Iryna Brémond | (Germany) Gréta Arn (Hungary) Rita Kuti-Kis | 6–4, 4–6, 7–6^{(5)} |
| Win | 6 June 2005 | 25,000 | Grado Tennis Cup, Italy | Clay | (Russia) Maria Kondratieva | (Australia) Daniella Jeflea (Belarus) Darya Kustova | 6–1, 3–6, 7–5 |
| Loss | 25 September 2005 | 25,000 | ITF Tbilisi, Georgia | Clay | (Poland) Karolina Kosińska | (Belarus) Ekaterina Dzehalevich (Belarus) Tatsiana Kapshai | 0–6, 5–7 |

== Fed Cup participation ==
=== Singles ===
| Edition | Date | Location | Against | Surface | Opponent | W/L | Score |
|---|---|---|---|---|---|---|---|
| 2004 Fed Cup; Europe/Africa Zone I | 19 April 2004 | Athens, Greece | (Denmark) Denmark | Clay | (Denmark) Maria Rasmussen | W | 6–1, 6–1 |
| 2004 Fed Cup; Europe/Africa Zone I | 22 April 2004 | Athens, Greece | Hungary | Clay | (Hungary) Kira Nagy | W | 6–3, 6–0 |
| 2004 Fed Cup; Europe/Africa Zone I | 24 April 2004 | Athens, Greece | Sweden | Clay | (Sweden) Hanna Nooni | W | 7–5, 6–4 |
| 2004 Fed Cup; World Group play-offs | 10 July 2004 | Bratislava, Slovakia | (Slovakia) Slovakia | Clay | (Slovakia) Ľubomíra Kurhajcová | L | 2–6, 1–6 |
