= Magdalena Kiszczyńska =

Polish tennis player

- Country (sports): Poland
- Born: 14 April 1988 (age 38) Szczecin, Poland
- Turned pro: 2003
- Plays: Right (two-handed backhand)
- Prize money: $68,610

Singles
- Career record: 154–120
- Career titles: 3 ITF
- Highest ranking: No. 293 (8 October 2007)

Doubles
- Career record: 138–80
- Career titles: 18 ITF
- Highest ranking: No. 147 (27 July 2009)

Magdalena Kiszczyńska (Polish pronunciation: [maɡdaˈlɛna kʲiˈʂt͡ʂɨj̃ska]; born 14 April 1988) is a former tennis player from Poland.

As a professional, her career-high singles ranking is world No. 293, achieved on 8 October 2007, in doubles 147 (27 July 2009). She won three titles in singles and 18 doubles titles at tournaments of the ITF Women's Circuit.

== ITF Circuit finals ==
Legend
$50,000 tournaments
$25,000 tournaments
$10,000 tournaments

=== Singles: 7 (3–4) ===
Result	No.	Date	Tournament	Surface	Opponent	Score
Win	1.	19 May 2003	ITF Olecko, Poland	Clay	(Czech Republic) Dominika Luzarová	6–2, 3–0 ret.
Loss	2.	23 May 2004	ITF Gdynia, Poland	Clay	(Poland) Klaudia Jans-Ignacik	4–6, 6–3, 3–6
Loss	3.	11 July 2004	Bella Cup Toruń, Poland	Clay	(Poland) Karolina Kosińska	6–4, 5–7, 1–6
Win	4.	9 October 2006	Lagos Open, Nigeria	Hard	(Germany) Laura Siegemund	6–4, 6–2
Win	5.	2 June 2007	ITF Olecko, Poland	Clay	(Belarus) Aleksandra Malyarchikova	6–2, 6–1
Loss	6.	2 June 2007	ITF Olecko, Poland	Clay	(Poland) Edyta Cieplucha	2–6, 0–6
Loss	7.	29 March 2009	ITF Gonesse, France	Clay	(Germany) Julia Babilon	6–3, 3–6, 4–6

=== Doubles: 28 (18–10) ===
Result	No.	Date	Tournament	Surface	Partner	Opponents	Score
Loss	1.	24 August 2003	ITF Kędzierzyn-Koźle, Poland	Clay	(Poland) Karolina Kosińska	(Czech Republic) Iveta Grelová (Slovakia) Zuzana Zemenová	5–7, 3–6
Win	2.	25 March 2006	ITF Parioli, Italy	Clay	(Romania) Simona Matei	(Italy) Stefania Chieppa (Italy) Valentina Sulpizio	6–3, 6–2
Win	3.	25 June 2006	ITF Davos, Switzerland	Clay	(Czech Republic) Lucie Kriegsmannová	(Mexico) Erika Clarke (Mexico) Lorena Villalobos Cruz	6–1, 7–6^{(4)}
Win	4.	26 February 2007	ITF Buchen, Germany	Carpet (i)	(Czech Republic) Nikola Fraňková	(Austria) Eva-Maria Hoch (Switzerland) Lisa Sabino	w/o
Win	5.	20 April 2007	ITF Hvar, Croatia	Clay	(Romania) Mihaela Buzărnescu	(France) Émilie Bacquet (Serbia) Karolina Jovanović	6–4, 6–2
Loss	6.	5 May 2007	ITF Makarska, Croatia	Clay	(Russia) Anastasia Poltoratskaya	(Sweden) Mari Andersson (Sweden) Nadja Roma	w/o
Loss	7.	14 July 2007	Bella Cup, Poland	Clay	(Poland) Natalia Kołat	(Bosnia and Herzegovina) Sandra Martinović (Switzerland) Stefanie Vögele	6–2, 4–6, 3–6
Loss	8.	20 July 2007	ITF Zwevegem, Belgium	Clay	(Poland) Karolina Kosińska	(Netherlands) Kim Kilsdonk (Netherlands) Elise Tamaëla	6–3, 4–6, 3–6
Loss	9.	1 August 2007	ITF Coimbra, Portugal	Hard	(Belgium) Yanina Wickmayer	(Hungary) Kira Nagy (Portugal) Neuza Silva	3–6, 6–3, 5–7
Win	10.	12 September 2007	ITF Sofia, Bulgaria	Clay	(Romania) Mihaela Buzărnescu	(Brazil) Joana Cortez (Brazil) Teliana Pereira	6–4, 6–7^{(2)}, [10–4]
Win	11.	2 October 2007	ITF Mytilini, Greece	Hard	(Poland) Olga Brózda	(Italy) Nicole Clerico (Greece) Anna Koumantou	6–2, 7–6^{(3)}
Win	12.	9 October 2007	ITF Volos, Greece	Carpet	(Poland) Olga Brózda	(Poland) Justyna Jegiołka (Ukraine) Anastasiya Vasylyeva	6–3, 7–6^{(5)}
Win	13.	17 March 2008	ITF Rome, Italy	Clay	(Belarus) Ksenia Milevskaya	(Italy) Giulia Gatto-Monticone (Italy) Federica Quercia	6–0, 6–4
Win	14.	27 May 2008	ITF Olecko, Poland	Clay	(Poland) Olga Brózda	(Sweden) Annie Goransson (Denmark) Hanne Skak Jensen	6–4, 6–2
Win	15.	1 July 2008	Bella Cup, Poland	Clay	(Poland) Olga Brózda	(Romania) Mihaela Buzărnescu (Russia) Anastasia Pivovarova	4–6, 6–4, [10–2]
Win	16.	12 August 2008	Palić Open, Serbia	Clay	(Poland) Olga Brózda	(Bosnia and Herzegovina) Mervana Jugić-Salkić (Serbia) Teodora Mirčić	6–3, 7–6^{(5)}
Win	17.	2 September 2008	ITF Brno, Czech Republic	Clay	(Poland) Olga Brózda	(Czech Republic) Hana Birnerová (Czech Republic) Darina Sedenková	6–2, 6–2
Loss	18.	9 February 2009	ITF Mallorca, Spain	Clay	(Czech Republic) Simona Dobrá	(Serbia) Neda Kozić (France) Laura Thorpe	3–6, 6–2, [3–10]
Win	19.	16 March 2009	ITF Amiens, France	Clay	(Poland) Olga Brózda	(Romania) Bianca Hincu (France) Anaïs Laurendon	6–2, 6–1
Win	20.	23 March 2009	ITF Gonesse, France	Clay	(Poland) Olga Brózda	(Italy) Martina Caciotti (Italy) Nicole Clerico	6–1, 6–2
Loss	21.	13 September 2009	ITF Denain, France	Clay	(Serbia) Teodora Mirčić	(Russia) Elena Chalova (Russia) Ksenia Lykina	4–6, 3–6
Win	22.	1 March 2010	ITF Lyon, France	Hard (i)	(Poland) Olga Brózda	(Romania) Elena Bogdan (France) Stéphanie Vongsouthi	5–7, 6–4, [10–6]
Loss	23.	8 March 2010	ITF Dijon, France	Hard (i)	(Poland) Olga Brózda	(France) Estelle Guisard (France) Anaïs Laurendon	5–7, 5–7
Win	24.	12 April 2010	ITF Tessenderlo, Belgium	Clay (i)	(Finland) Emma Laine	(Poland) Olga Brózda (Poland) Barbara Sobaszkiewicz	6–4, 6–1
Loss	25.	4 July 2010	ITF Stuttgart, Germany	Clay	(Japan) Erika Sema	(Luxembourg) Mandy Minella (France) Irena Pavlovic	3–6, 4–6
Win	26.	7 August 2011	ITF Iława, Poland	Clay	(Vietnam) Huỳnh Phương Đài Trang	(Poland) Karolina Kosińska (Poland) Aleksandra Rosolska	2–6, 6–3, [10–7]
Loss	27.	22 August 2011	ITF Charleroi, Belgium	Clay	(Australia) Karolina Wlodarczak	(China) Lu Jiajing (China) Lu Jiaxiang	3–6, 0–6
Win	28.	21 November 2011	ITF La Vall d'Uixó, Spain	Clay	(Switzerland) Viktorija Golubic	(Spain) Yvonne Cavallé Reimers (Spain) Arabela Fernández Rabener	7–5, 3–6, [10–8]
