= Anastasia Poltoratskaya =

Russian tennis player

Anastasia Poltoratskaya Анастасия Полторацкая
- Country (sports): Russia
- Born: 4 April 1988 (age 37) Ekaterinburg, USSR
- Height: 1.66 m (5 ft 5 in)
- Turned pro: 2005
- Plays: Right-handed (two–handed backhand)
- Prize money: $53,096

Singles
- Career record: 123–92
- Career titles: 0
- Highest ranking: No. 277 (6 July 2009)

Doubles
- Career record: 88–69
- Career titles: 6 ITF
- Highest ranking: No. 145 (17 August 2009)

Anastasia Viktorevna Poltoratskaya (Russian: Анастасия Викторевна Полторацкая, born 4 April 1988) is a Russian former professional tennis player.

She won six doubles titles and reached five singles finals at tournaments on the ITF Circuit. On 6 July 2009, she achieved her best singles ranking of world No. 277. On 17 August 2009, she peaked at No. 145 in the WTA doubles rankings.

== Personal life ==
Poltoratskaya is the only child of Viktor and Tatiana, and resides in her hometown Ekaterinburg.

== ITF Circuit finals ==
$75,000 tournaments
$50,000 tournaments
$25,000 tournaments
$10,000 tournaments

=== Singles: 5 (0–5) ===
Outcome	No.	Date	Location	Surface	Opponent	Score
Runner-up	1.	28 January 2007	ITF Hull, Great Britain	Hard (i)	(Czech Republic) Kateřina Kramperová	6–7^{(4–7)}, 3–6
Runner-up	2.	4 March 2007	ITF Sant Boi, Spain	Clay	(Poland) Karolina Kosińska	5–7, 3–6
Runner-up	3.	11 March 2007	ITF Sabadell, Spain	Clay	(Spain) Rebeca Bou Nogueiro	3–6, 2–6
Runner-up	4.	6 May 2007	ITF Makarska, Croatia	Clay	(Slovenia) Maša Zec Peškirič	3–6, 3–6
Runner-up	5.	24 May 2009	ITF Moscow, Russia	Clay	(Australia) Arina Rodionova	6–7^{(4–7)}, 4–6

=== Doubles: 18 (6–12) ===
Outcome	No.	Date	Location	Surface	Partner	Opponents	Score
Runner-up	1.	7 May 2006	ITF Bournemouth, Great Britain	Clay	(Russia) Maya Gaverova	(Netherlands) Marrit Bonstra (Netherlands) Bibiane Weijers	4–6, 6–1, 4–6
Winner	1.	12 August 2006	ITF Moscow, Russia	Clay	(Australia) Arina Rodionova	(Russia) Anastasia Pivovarova (Russia) Yulia Solonitskaya	6–0, 6–2
Runner-up	2.	25 November 2006	ITF Ramat HaSharon, Israel	Hard	(Russia) Yulia Solonitskaya	(Netherlands) Marlot Meddens (Netherlands) Nicole Thyssen	3–6, 1–6
Runner-up	3.	5 May 2007	ITF Makarska, Croatia	Clay	(Poland) Magdalena Kiszczyńska	(Sweden) Mari Andersson (Sweden) Nadja Roma	w/o
Winner	2.	7 April 2007	ITF Cavtat, Croatia	Clay	(Croatia) Ana Savić	(Serbia) Karolina Jovanović (Serbia) Nataša Zorić	6–1, 6–1
Winner	3.	9 June 2007	ITF Zagreb, Croatia	Clay	(Serbia) Karolina Jovanović	(Montenegro) Danica Krstajić (Serbia) Teodora Mirčić	0–6, 6–3, 6–4
Runner-up	4.	28 October 2007	ITF Podolsk, Russia	Hard (i)	(Russia) Nina Bratchikova	(Russia) Vasilisa Davydova (Australia) Arina Rodionova	3–6, 0–6
Runner-up	5.	26 January 2008	ITF Kaarst, Germany	Carpet (i)	(Serbia) Neda Kozić	(Netherlands) Chayenne Ewijk (Netherlands) Daniëlle Harmsen	4–6, 1–6
Runner-up	6.	22 June 2008	ITF Alkmaar, Netherlands	Clay	(Serbia) Neda Kozić	(Netherlands) Daniëlle Harmsen (Netherlands) Renée Reinhard	2–6, 6–7^{(10–12)}
Runner-up	7.	30 August 2008	ITF Vlaardingen, Netherlands	Clay	(Latvia) Irina Kuzmina	(Bosnia and Herzegovina) Mervana Jugić-Salkić (Serbia) Teodora Mirčić	1–6, 2–6
Runner-up	8.	20 September 2008	ITF Madrid, Spain	Hard	(Ukraine) Yuliya Beygelzimer	(France) Julie Coin (France) Irena Pavlovic	3–6, 4–6
Winner	4.	24 October 2008	ITF Podolsk, Russia	Carpet (i)	(Ukraine) Lesia Tsurenko	(Belarus) Ima Bohush (Belarus) Darya Kustova	7–6^{(9–7)}, 1–6, [10–3]
Runner-up	9.	15 November 2008	ITF Minsk, Belarus	Hard (i)	(Ukraine) Lesia Tsurenko	(Russia) Alisa Kleybanova (Belarus) Tatiana Poutchek	1–6, 2–6
Winner	5.	21 November 2008	ITF Astana, Kazakhstan	Hard (i)	(Russia) Marina Melnikova	(Russia) Marina Shamayko (Georgia (country)) Sofia Shapatava	6–1, 6–1
Runner-up	10.	7 March 2009	ITF Buchen, Germany	Carpet (i)	(Ukraine) Kateryna Herth	(Bosnia and Herzegovina) Sandra Martinović (Switzerland) Romina Oprandi	7–5, 5–7, [8–10]
Runner-up	11.	6 June 2009	ITF Sarajevo, Bosnia and Herzegovina	Clay	(Russia) Yuliya Kalabina	(Denmark) Hanne Skak Jensen (Poland) Karolina Kosińska	6–7^{(4–7)}, 2–6
Winner	6.	26 June 2009	ITF Getxo, Spain	Clay	(Russia) Maria Kondratieva	(Argentina) Agustina Lepore (Portugal) Frederica Piedade	6–3, 6–1
Runner-up	12.	11 July 2009	ITF Zagreb, Croatia	Clay	(Russia) Elena Chalova	(Croatia) Darija Jurak (Czech Republic) Renata Voráčová	2–6, 5–7
