= Karolina Kosińska =

Polish tennis player

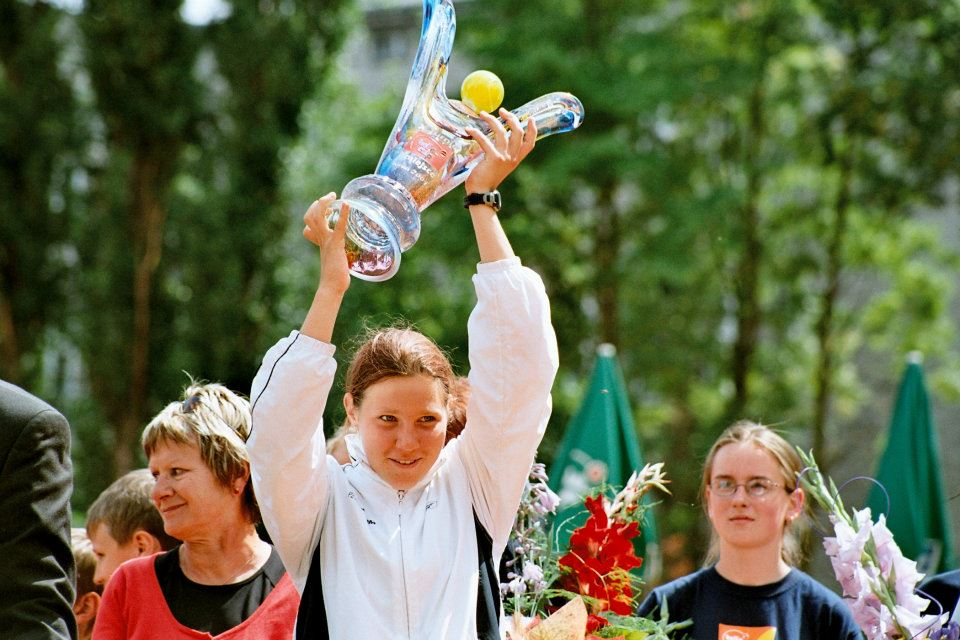
- Karolina Kosińska, 2004
- Country (sports): Poland
- Born: 17 June 1986 (age 38); Warsaw, Poland
- Turned pro: 2004
- Plays: Right (two-handed backhand)
- Prize money: $119,311

Singles
- Career record: 218–183
- Career titles: 6 ITF
- Highest ranking: No. 253 (4 July 2005)

Doubles
- Career record: 176–125
- Career titles: 14 ITF
- Highest ranking: No. 144 (10 September 2007)

Karolina Kosińska (Polish pronunciation: [karɔˈlina kɔˈsiɲska, -ˈsij̃ska]; born 17 June 1986) is a former tennis player from Poland.

Kosińska began playing tennis aged seven, her favourite surface was clay. As a professional, her career-high singles ranking was world No. 253, achieved in July 2005, in doubles No. 144 (September 2007).

== ITF finals ==
Legend
$75,000 tournaments
$50,000 tournaments
$25,000 tournaments
$10,000 tournaments

=== Singles (6–2) ===
Result	No.	Date	Tournament	Surface	Opponent	Score
Win	1.	11 July 2004	Bella Cup Toruń, Poland	Clay	(Poland) Magdalena Kiszczyńska	4–6, 7–5, 6–1
Win	2.	8 August 2004	ITF Gdynia, Poland	Clay	(Czech Republic) Petra Cetkovská	6–3, 6–2
Loss	1.	10 October 2004	ITF Lafayette, United States	Clay	(Lithuania) Lina Stančiūtė	6–3, 3–6, 5–7
Win	3.	4 March 2007	ITF Sant Boi, Spain	Clay	(Russia) Anastasia Poltoratskaya	7–5, 6–3
Win	4.	13 April 2008	ITF Šibenik, Croatia	Clay	(Croatia) Tamara Stojković	7–5, 6–1
Loss	2.	2 November 2008	ITF Mexico City	Hard	(Uruguay) Estefanía Craciún	5–7, 5–7
Win	5.	15 March 2009	ITF Rome, Italy	Clay	(Bulgaria) Dia Evtimova	6–2, 3–6, 6–4
Win	6.	19 April 2009	ITF Hvar, Croatia	Clay	(Croatia) Tereza Mrdeža	6–4, 6–3

=== Doubles (14–16) ===
Result	No.	Date	Tournament	Surface	Partner	Opponents	Score
Loss	1.	24 August 2003	ITF Kędzierzyn-Koźle, Poland	Clay	(Poland) Magdalena Kiszczyńska	(Czech Republic) Iveta Gerlová (Slovakia) Zuzana Zemenová	5–7, 3–6
Win	1.	30 May 2004	ITF Olecko, Poland	Clay	(Poland) Alicja Rosolska	(Czech Republic) Iveta Gerlová (Slovakia) Zuzana Zemenová	6–4, 6–3
Win	2.	7 May 2005	ITF Warsaw, Poland	Clay	(Poland) Alicja Rosolska	(Belarus) Tatiana Poutchek (Australia) Anastasia Rodionova	4–6, 6–2, 7–6^{(3)}
Loss	2.	18 September 2005	ITF Sofia, Bulgaria	Clay	(Brazil) Joana Cortez	(Croatia) Sanja Ančić (Austria) Tamira Paszek	7–6^{(9)}, 2–6, 4–6
Loss	3.	25 September 2005	ITF Tbilisi, Georgia	Clay	(Belarus) Tatsiana Uvarova	(Belarus) Ekaterina Dzehalevich (Belarus) Tatsiana Kapshai	0–6, 5–7
Loss	4.	5 March 2006	ITF Las Palmas, Spain	Hard	(Poland) Alicja Rosolska	(Russia) Nina Bratchikova (Russia) Alla Kudryavtseva	1–6, 3–6
Win	3.	26 May 2006	ITF La Palma, Spain	Hard	(Poland) Olga Brózda	(Croatia) Matea Mezak (Croatia) Nadja Pavić	4–6, 6–3, 6–4
Loss	5.	27 January 2007	ITF Grenoble, France	Hard (i)	(France) Stéphanie Rizzi	(France) Shérazad Benamar (France) Julie Coin	6–1, 5–7, 4–6
Loss	6.	12 May 2007	ITF Warsaw, Poland	Clay	(Australia) Arina Rodionova	(Croatia) Josipa Bek (Bosnia and Herzegovina) Sandra Martinović	3–6, 6–2, 3–6
Loss	7.	20 July 2007	ITF Zwevegem, Belgium	Clay	(Poland) Magdalena Kiszczyńska	(Netherlands) Kim Kilsdonk (Netherlands) Elise Tamaëla	6–3, 4–6, 3–6
Win	4.	11 August 2007	ITF Gdynia, Poland	Clay	(Czech Republic) Veronika Chvojková	(Netherlands) Michelle Gerards (Poland) Monika Krauze	6–1, 7–5
Loss	8.	3 September 2007	ITF Denain, France	Clay	(Switzerland) Timea Bacsinszky	(Czech Republic) Eva Hrdinová (Canada) Marie-Ève Pelletier	3–6, 2–6
Win	5.	7 April 2008	ITF Šibenik, Croatia	Clay	(Czech Republic) Darina Sedenková	(Italy) Nicole Clerico (Italy) Giorgia Mortello	4–6, 7–6^{(5)}, [10–8]
Loss	9.	25 August 2008	ITF Katowice, Poland	Clay	(Poland) Aleksandra Rosolska	(Latvia) Anastasija Sevastova (Slovakia) Lenka Wienerová	7–5, 3–6, [3–10]
Win	6.	23 November 2008	ITF Opole, Poland	Carpet (i)	(Poland) Aleksandra Rosolska	(Poland) Katarzyna Piter (Netherlands) Arantxa Rus	2–6, 7–6^{(6)}, [10–7]
Win	7.	20 March 2009	ITF Rome, Italy	Clay	(Czech Republic) Simona Dobrá	(Italy) Claudia Giovine (Italy) Valentina Sulpizio	6–3, 6–4
Loss	10.	2 May 2009	ITF Makarska, Croatia	Clay	(Czech Republic) Tereza Hladíková	(Germany) Tatjana Malek (Czech Republic) Renata Voráčová	4–6, 7–5, [6–10]
Win	8.	10 May 2009	ITF Warsaw, Poland	Clay	(Czech Republic) Iveta Gerlová	(Poland) Katarzyna Kaleta (Poland) Katarzyna Kawa	6–2, 6–1
Win	9.	30 May 2009	ITF Olecko, Poland	Clay	(Poland) Aleksandra Rosolska	(Poland) Veronika Domagała (Australia) Karolina Wlodarczak	2–6, 6–2, [11–9]
Win	10.	6 June 2009	ITF Sarajevo, Bosnia and Herzegovina	Clay	(Denmark) Hanne Skak Jensen	(Russia) Yuliya Kalabina (Russia) Anastasia Poltoratskaya	7–6^{(4)}, 6–2
Loss	11.	3 July 2009	ITF Toruń, Poland	Clay	(Poland) Aleksandra Rosolska	(Ukraine) Yuliya Beygelzimer (Belarus) Ksenia Milevskaya	1–6, 4–6
Win	11.	1 August 2009	ITF Vigo, Spain	Hard	(France) Laura Thorpe	(United Kingdom) Jade Curtis (United Kingdom) Georgie Gent	7–6^{(3)}, 6–2
Win	12.	6 September 2009	ITF Katowice, Poland	Clay	(Romania) Ágnes Szatmári	(Austria) Melanie Klaffner (Sweden) Johanna Larsson	6–1, 2–6, [10–5]
Win	13.	10 October 2009	Royal Cup, Montenegro	Clay	(Italy) Nicole Clerico	(Serbia) Karolina Jovanović (Serbia) Teodora Mirčić	6–7^{(4)}, 6–4, [10–4]
Loss	12.	22 March 2010	ITF Namangan, Uzbekistan	Hard	(Slovakia) Lenka Wienerová	(Ukraine) Kristina Antoniychuk (Russia) Ksenia Lykina	3–6, 7–5, [8–10]
Loss	13.	3 July 2010	ITF Sarajevo, Bosnia and Herzegovina	Clay	(Italy) Nicole Clerico	(Ukraine) Irina Buryachok (France) Irena Pavlovic	1–6, 1–6
Win	14.	25 October 2010	Lagos Open, Nigeria	Hard	(Austria) Melanie Klaffner	(Russia) Nina Bratchikova (Romania) Ágnes Szatmári	3–6, 7–5, [10–7]
Loss	14.	27 March 2011	ITF Madrid, Spain	Clay	(Ukraine) Yevgeniya Kryvoruchko	(Spain) Lucía Cervera Vázquez (Italy) Benedetta Davato	5–7, 6–7^{(4)}
Loss	15.	7 August 2011	ITF Iława, Poland	Clay	(Poland) Aleksandra Rosolska	(Vietnam) Huỳnh Phương Đài Trang (Poland) Magdalena Kiszczyńska	6–2, 3–6, [7–10]
Loss	16.	28 May 2012	ITF Warsaw, Poland	Clay	(Poland) Aleksandra Rosolska	(United States) Caitlin Whoriskey (Belgium) Elyne Boeykens	2–6, 2–6
