= Darya Kustova =

Belarusian tennis player

Darya Kustova Дар'я Кустава
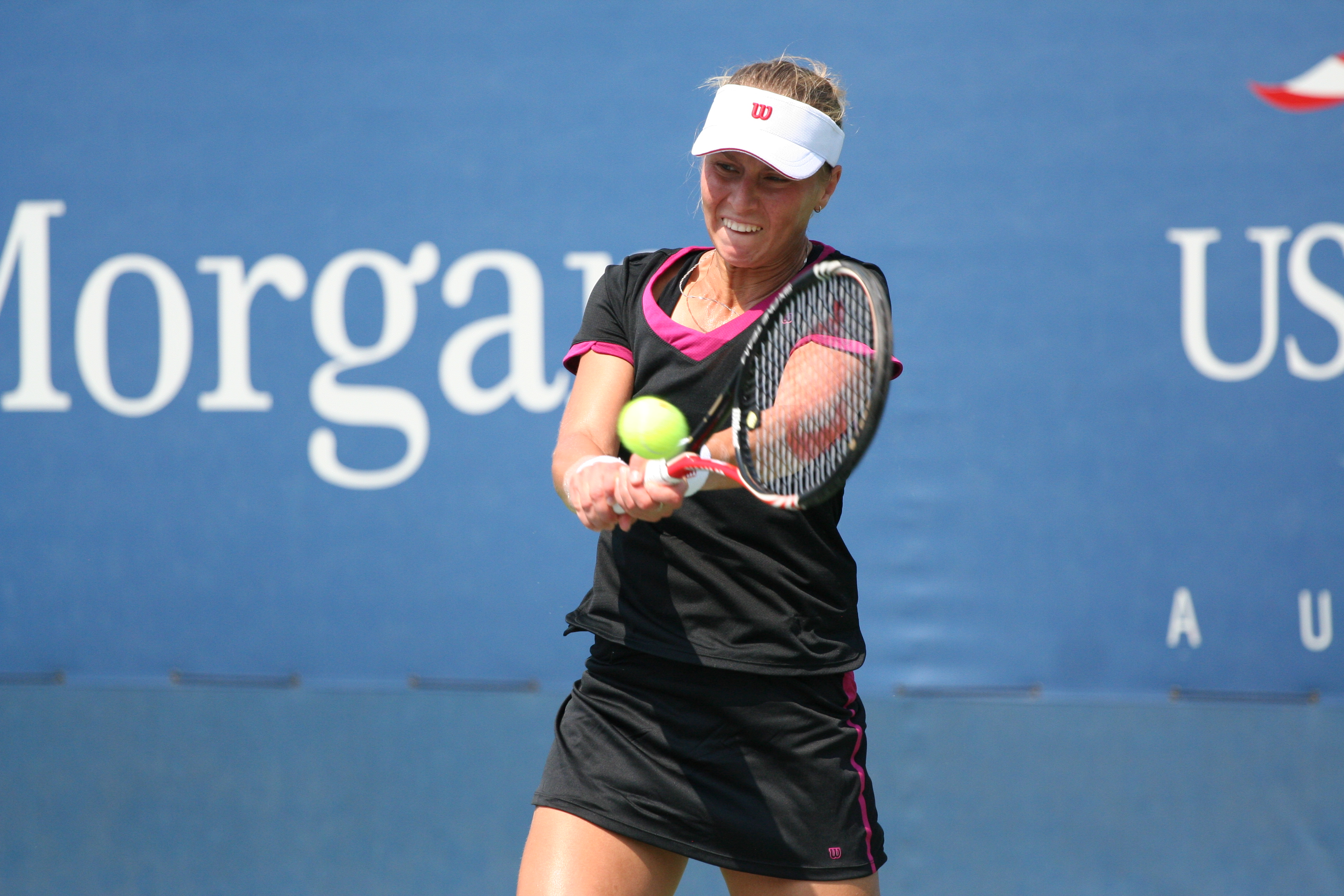
- Kustova at the 2010 US Open
- Country (sports): Belarus
- Residence: Minsk, Belarus
- Born: 29 May 1986 (age 39) Moscow, Soviet Union
- Turned pro: 2000
- Retired: 2013
- Prize money: $384,299

Singles
- Career record: 254–217
- Career titles: 7 ITF
- Highest ranking: No. 117 (18 January 2010)

Doubles
- Career record: 291–161
- Career titles: 1 WTA, 29 ITF
- Highest ranking: No. 66 (7 July 2008)

Grand Slam doubles results
- Australian Open: 2R (2008)
- French Open: 1R (2004, 2008)
- Wimbledon: 3R (2008)
- US Open: 2R (2010)

Darya Kustova (Belarusian: Дар'я Кустава; Russian: Дарья Кустова; born 29 May 1986) is a Belarusian former tennis player.

Her career-high WTA rankings are 117 in singles, which she reached in January 2010, and 66 in doubles, attained in July 2008.

Kustova won one doubles title on the WTA Tour, partnering Mariya Koryttseva, as well as seven singles and 29 doubles titles on tournaments of the ITF Circuit.

Playing for Belarus Fed Cup team, she has accumulated a win–loss record of 11–4.

Kustova retired from tour tennis before the 2013 season.

== WTA career finals ==
=== Doubles: 2 (1 title, 1 runner-up) ===
Legend before 2009	Starting in 2009
Grand Slam tournaments
Tier I (0–0)	Premier Mandatory
Tier II (0–0)	Premier 5
Tier III (0–0)	Premier
Tier IV & V (1–0)	International (0–1)

Result	Date	Tournament	Surface	Partner	Opponents	Score
Win	Jul 2007	Palermo Ladies Open, Italy	Clay	(Ukraine) Mariya Koryttseva	(Italy) Alice Canepa (Italy) Karin Knapp	6–4, 6–1
Loss	Jul 2009	Palermo Ladies Open, Italy	Clay	(Ukraine) Mariya Koryttseva	(Spain) Nuria Llagostera Vives (Spain) María José Martínez Sánchez	1–6, 2–6

== ITF Circuit finals ==
=== Singles: 8 (7–1) ===
$100,000 tournaments
$75,000 tournaments
$50,000 tournaments
$25,000 tournaments
$10,000 tournaments

Result	No.	Date	Tournament	Surface	Opponent	Score
Win	1.	Mar 2007	ITF Rome, Italy	Clay	(Germany) Anne Schäfer	6–1, 6–4
Win	2.	Apr 2007	ITF Civitavecchia, Italy	Clay	(Italy) Karin Knapp	3–6, 6–4, 6–4
Win	3.	Apr 2007	ITF Catania, Italy	Clay	(Romania) Raluca Olaru	6–3, 2–6, 6–3
Win	4.	Jun 2007	Grado Tennis Cup, Italy	Clay	(Germany) Angelika Rösch	6–2, 3–6, 6–2
Win	5.	Mar 2009	ITF Minsk, Belarus	Carpet (i)	(United Kingdom) Katie O'Brien	6–7, 6–1, 6–4
Win	6.	Mar 2009	ITF Rome, Italy	Clay	(Poland) Anna Korzeniak	6–2, 6–2
Win	7.	May 2009	ITF Florence, Italy	Clay	(Italy) Federica di Sarra	6–2, 6–1
Loss	1.	Aug 2010	ITF Moscow, Russia	Clay	(Russia) Ekaterina Bychkova	2–6, 5–7

=== Doubles: 56 (29–27) ===
Result	No.	Date	Tournament	Surface	Partner	Opponents	Score
Loss	1.	Sep 2000	ITF Moscow, Russia	Carpet (i)	(Russia) Alexandra Zerkalova	(Russia) Galina Fokina (Russia) Raissa Gourevitch	1–6, 0–6
Loss	2.	May 2001	ITF Szczecin, Poland	Clay	(Russia) Anastassia Belova	(Slovakia) Martina Babáková (Czech Republic) Iveta Melzer	4–6, 6–7^{(4)}
Loss	3.	Nov 2001	ITF Minsk, Belarus	Carpet (i)	(Belarus) Tatsiana Uvarova	(Russia) Anna Bastrikova (Russia) Vera Dushevina	5–7, 6–3, 0–6
Loss	4.	May 2002	ITF Kyiv, Ukraine	Clay	(Poland) Magdalena Marszałek	(Ukraine) Tatiana Kovalchuk (Ukraine) Anna Zaporozhanova	2–6, 3–6
Loss	5.	Jul 2002	ITF Stuttgart-Vaihingen, Germany	Clay	(Slovenia) Petra Rampre	(Austria) Barbara Schwartz (Germany) Jasmin Wöhr	7–5, 4–6, 6–7^{(4)}
Loss	6.	Aug 2002	ITF Gdynia, Poland	Clay	(Ukraine) Olena Antypina	(Slovakia) Lenka Tvarošková (Slovakia) Zuzana Zemenová	3–6, 6–7^{(3)}
Loss	7.	Sep 2002	ITF Fano, Italy	Clay	(Russia) Goulnara Fattakhetdinova	(Italy) Flavia Pennetta (Romania) Andreea Ehritt-Vanc	5–7, 3–6
Win	1.	Mar 2003	ITF Kaunas, Lithuania	Hard (i)	(Ukraine) Elena Tatarkova	(Lithuania) Aurelija Misevičiūtė (Lithuania) Lina Stančiūtė	6–1, 7–6^{(6)}
Win	2.	Sep 2003	ITF Tbilisi, Georgia	Clay	(Ukraine) Elena Tatarkova	(Belarus) Nadejda Ostrovskaya (Kazakhstan) Galina Voskoboeva	2–6, 6–2, 7–6^{(5)}
Win	3.	Sep 2003	Batumi Ladies Open, Georgia	Hard	(Ukraine) Elena Tatarkova	(Russia) Goulnara Fattakhetdinova (Russia) Galina Fokina	1–6, 6–1, 6–2
Loss	8.	Mar 2004	Neva Cup, Russia	Hard (i)	(Ukraine) Elena Tatarkova	(Russia) Maria Goloviznina (Russia) Evgenia Kulikovskaya	5–7, 1–6
Win	4.	Sep 2004	ITF Tbilisi, Georgia	Clay	(Russia) Elena Vesnina	(Russia) Maria Kondratieva (Russia) Ekaterina Kozhokina	6–2, 6–4
Win	5.	Oct 2004	ITF Minsk, Belarus	Carpet (i)	(Belarus) Anastasiya Yakimova	(Russia) Irina Bulykina (Slovakia) Katarína Kachlíková	6–4, 6–0
Loss	9.	Feb 2005	ITF Redbridge, United Kingdom	Hard (i)	(Russia) Ekaterina Makarova	(Italy) Giulia Casoni (Italy) Francesca Lubiani	4–6, 3–6
Loss	10.	Jun 2005	Grado Tennis Cup, Italy	Clay	(Australia) Daniella Jeflea	(Russia) Maria Kondratieva (Belarus) Tatsiana Uvarova	1–6, 6–3, 5–7
Loss	11.	Aug 2005	ITF Rimini, Italy	Clay	(Russia) Ekaterina Makarova	(Italy) Giulia Casoni (Ukraine) Mariya Koryttseva	2–6, 4–6
Win	6.	Aug 2005	ITF Moscow, Russia	Clay	(Russia) Ekaterina Kozhokina	(Belarus) Nadejda Ostrovskaya (Israel) Yevgenia Savransky	6–2, 6–4
Loss	12.	Oct 2005	Open de Touraine, France	Hard (i)	(Hungary) Zsófia Gubacsi	(Croatia) Jelena Kostanić Tošić (Croatia) Matea Mezak	4–6, 4–6
Win	7.	Nov 2005	ITF Minsk, Belarus	Carpet (i)	(Belarus) Ekaterina Dzehalevich	(Poland) Agnieszka Radwańska (Poland) Urszula Radwańska	6–3, 6–3
Win	8.	Feb 2006	ITF Capriolo, Italy	Carpet (i)	(Russia) Ekaterina Makarova	(Georgia (country)) Margalita Chakhnashvili (Russia) Ekaterina Lopes	6–2, 6–4
Win	9.	Mar 2006	ITF Minsk Belarus	Carpet (i)	(Belarus) Ima Bohush	(Belarus) Ekaterina Dzehalevich (Belarus) Tatsiana Kapshai	1–6, 6–3, 6–2
Win	10.	May 2006	ITF Casale Monferrato, Italy	Clay	(Italy) Giulia Gatto-Monticone	(Russia) Anastasia Pavlyuchenkova (Russia) Irina Smirnova	6–2, 6–2
Loss	13.	Jul 2006	ITF Cuneo, Italy	Hard (i)	(Italy) Giulia Gatto-Monticone	(Italy) Sara Errani (Italy) Karin Knapp	3–6, 6–7^{(5)}
Win	11.	Nov 2006	ITF Minsk, Belarus	Carpet (i)	(Russia) Ekaterina Makarova	(Belarus) Ekaterina Dzehalevich (Russia) Evgeniya Rodina	6–4, 6–4
Loss	14.	Nov 2006	ITF Poitiers, France	Hard (i)	(Belarus) Tatiana Poutchek	(Ukraine) Yuliya Beygelzimer (Ukraine) Yuliana Fedak	5–7, 3–6
Loss	15.	Jan 2007	ITF Capriolo, Italy	Carpet (i)	(Ukraine) Mariya Koryttseva	(Italy) Sara Errani (Italy) Giulia Gabba	4–6, 5–7
Loss	16.	Feb 2007	ITF Ortisei, Italy	Carpet (i)	(Belarus) Tatiana Poutchek	(Czech Republic) Olga Vymetálková (Ukraine) Mariya Koryttseva	3–6, 6–4, 3–6
Win	12.	Mar 2007	ITF Minsk, Belarus	Carpet (i)	(France) Iryna Brémond	(Russia) Ekaterina Makarova (Russia) Evgeniya Rodina	4–6, 6–4, 6–4
Win	13.	Mar 2007	ITF Rome, Italy	Clay	(Italy) Giulia Gatto-Monticone	(Netherlands) Daniëlle Harmsen (Austria) Marlena Metzinger	6–4, 6–1
Win	14.	Mar 2007	ITF Rome, Italy	Clay	(Italy) Giulia Gatto-Monticone	(Romania) Alexandra Dulgheru (Serbia) Vojislava Lukić	5–7, 6–1, 6–2
Loss	17.	Apr 2007	ITF Civitavecchia, Italy	Clay	(Russia) Ekaterina Makarova	(Belarus) Ekaterina Dzehalevich (Ukraine) Mariya Koryttseva	6–7^{(6)}, 7–5, 6–1
Win	15.	May 2007	ITF Catania, Italy	Clay	(Belgium) Debbrich Feys	(New Zealand) Leanne Baker (Australia) Nicole Kriz	6–4, 6–4
Win	16.	May 2007	Open Saint-Gaudens, France	Clay	(Argentina) Jorgelina Cravero	(Uzbekistan) Akgul Amanmuradova (France) Iryna Brémond	6–1, 6–3
Loss	18.	Jun 2007	ITF Galatina, Italy	Clay	(Italy) Stefania Chieppa	(Czech Republic) Eva Hrdinová (Canada) Marie-Ève Pelletier	1–6, 6–7^{(4)}
Win	17.	Jun 2007	Grado Tennis Cup, Italy	Clay	(Italy) Stefania Chieppa	(Montenegro) Ana Veselinović (Australia) Christina Wheeler	7–5, 6–3
Win	18.	Jul 2007	ITF Cuneo, Italy	Clay	(Russia) Ekaterina Makarova	(Ukraine) Yuliya Beygelzimer (Georgia (country)) Margalita Chakhnashvili	6–2, 2–6, 6–2
Loss	19.	Aug 2007	Bronx Open, United States	Hard	(Ukraine) Mariya Koryttseva	(Czech Republic) Lucie Hradecká (Poland) Urszula Radwańska	3–6, 6–1, 1–6
Loss	20.	Sep 2007	Save Cup, Italy	Clay	(Bosnia and Herzegovina) Mervana Jugić-Salkić	(Russia) Alisa Kleybanova (Estonia) Margit Rüütel	2–6, 5–7
Win	19.	Sep 2007	ITF Kharkiv, Ukraine	Hard	(Ukraine) Mariya Koryttseva	(Ukraine) Alona Bondarenko (Ukraine) Kateryna Bondarenko	7–6^{(10)}, 6–3
Loss	21.	Apr 2008	ITF Civitavecchia, Italy	Clay	(Italy) Stefania Chieppa	(Argentina) Jorgelina Cravero (Argentina) Betina Jozami	6–4, 3–6, [6–10]
Loss	22.	Oct 2008	ITF Podolsk, Russia	Carpet (i)	(Belarus) Ima Bohush	(Russia) Anastasia Poltoratskaya (Ukraine) Lesia Tsurenko	7–6^{(7)}, 1–6, [3–10]
Win	20.	Jan 2009	ITF Boca Raton, United States	Clay	(Russia) Alina Jidkova	(United States) Kimberly Couts (Canada) Sharon Fichman	6–4, 6–2
Loss	23.	Feb 2009	ITF Rancho Mirage, United States	Hard	(Russia) Alina Jidkova	(South Africa) Natalie Grandin (United States) Courtney Nagle	2–6, 6–7^{(6)}
Win	21.	Mar 2009	ITF Minsk, Belarus	Carpet (i)	(Belarus) Ima Bohush	(Russia) Vitalia Diatchenko (Russia) Eugeniya Pashkova	6–1, 4–6, [10–8]
Loss	24.	Apr 2009	ITF Civitavecchia, Italy	Clay	(Belarus) Tatiana Poutchek	(Argentina) Erica Krauth (France) Aurélie Védy	1–6, 1–6
Win	22.	Jul 2009	ITF Cuneo, Italy	Clay	(Uzbekistan) Akgul Amanmuradova	(Czech Republic) Petra Cetkovská (France) Mathilde Johansson	5–7, 6–1, [10–7]
Loss	25.	Jul 2009	Open de Biarritz, France	Clay	(Uzbekistan) Akgul Amanmuradova	(Australia) Anastasia Rodionova (Chinese Taipei) Chan Yung-jan	6–3, 4–6, [7–10]
Win	23.	Aug 2009	ITF Astana, Kazakhstan	Hard	(Ukraine) Yuliana Fedak	(Russia) Nina Bratchikova (Romania) Ágnes Szatmári	6–4, 7–5
Loss	26.	Sep 2009	ITF Biella, Italy	Clay	(Czech Republic) Renata Voráčová	(Austria) Sandra Klemenschits (Czech Republic) Vladimíra Uhlířová	6–4, 3–6, [6–10]
Win	24.	Oct 2009	ITF Jounieh Open, Lebanon	Clay	(Ukraine) Mariya Koryttseva	(Belarus) Ekaterina Dzehalevich (Ukraine) Yuliana Fedak	6–3, 6–4
Win	25.	Oct 2009	ITF Madrid, Spain	Clay	(Czech Republic) Renata Voráčová	(Australia) Arina Rodionova (Russia) Ekaterina Lopes	6–2, 6–2
Win	26.	Apr 2010	ITF Civitavecchia, Italy	Clay	(Czech Republic) Renata Voráčová	(Estonia) Maret Ani (Ukraine) Irina Buryachok	7–5, 7–5
Loss	27.	Jun 2010	ITF Brno, Czech Republic	Clay	(Ukraine) Lesia Tsurenko	(Germany) Carmen Klaschka (Germany) Laura Siegemund	w/o
Win	27.	May 2011	ITF Prague, Czech Republic	Clay	(Australia) Arina Rodionova	(Ukraine) Olga Savchuk (Ukraine) Lesia Tsurenko	2–6, 6–1, [10–7]
Win	28.	Dec 2011	ITF Tyumen, Russia	Hard (i)	(Ukraine) Olga Savchuk	(Russia) Natela Dzalamidze (Russia) Margarita Gasparyan	6–0, 6–2
Win	29.	Jan 2012	ITF Innisbrook, United States	Clay	(Romania) Raluca Olaru	(Italy) Gioia Barbieri (Russia) Nadejda Guskova	6–3, 6–1
