= Anikó Kapros =

Hungarian tennis player

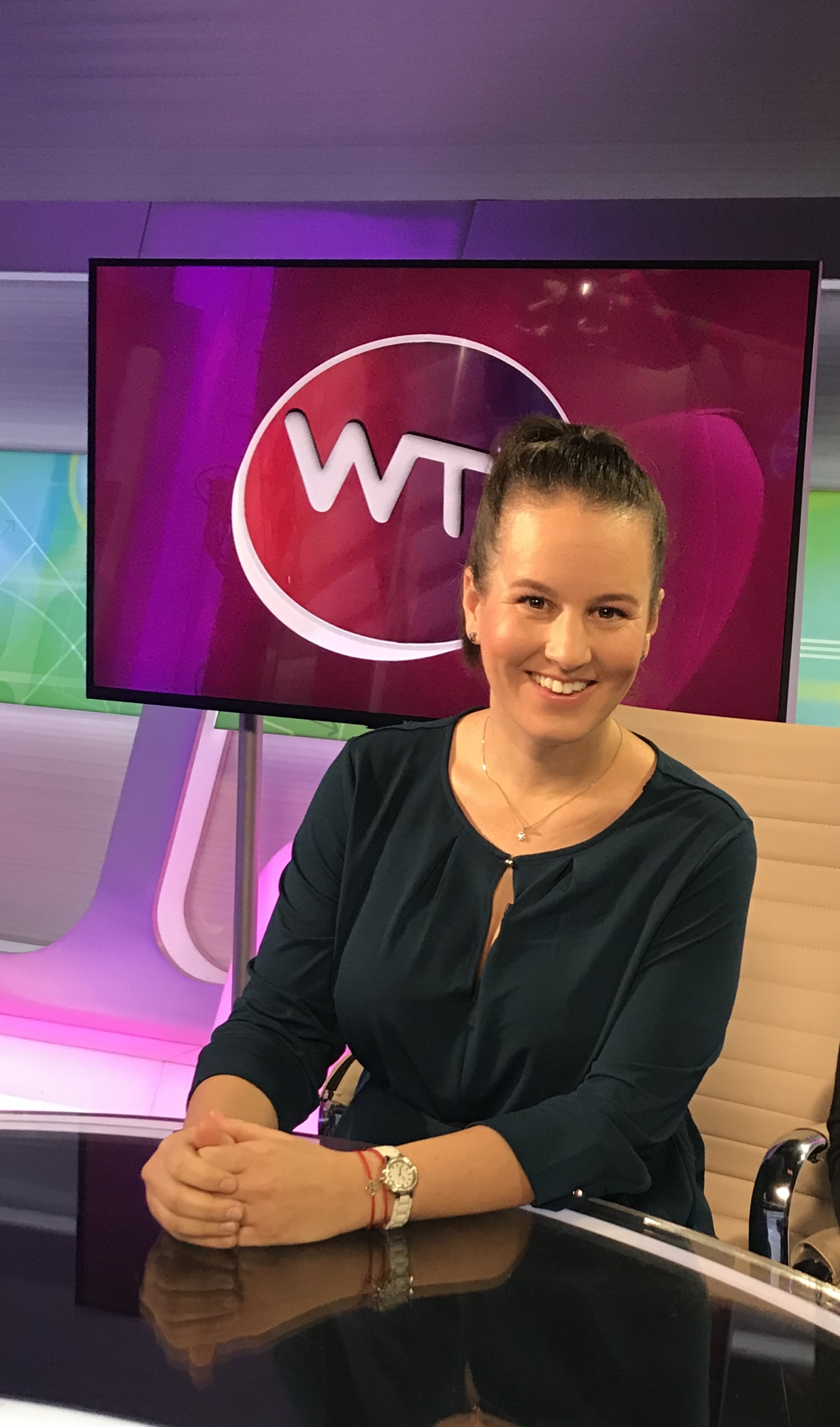
- Country (sports): Hungary
- Born: 11 November 1983 (age 42) Budapest, People's Republic of Hungary
- Height: 1.73 m (5 ft 8 in)
- Turned pro: 2000
- Retired: 2010
- Plays: Right (two-handed backhand)
- Prize money: $490,850

Singles
- Career record: 197–184
- Career titles: 2 ITF
- Highest ranking: No. 44 (10 May 2004)

Grand Slam singles results
- Australian Open: 4R (2004)
- French Open: 3R (2002)
- Wimbledon: 3R (2003)
- US Open: 1R (2001, 2003, 2004)

Doubles
- Career record: 25–43
- Career titles: 4 ITF
- Highest ranking: No. 222 (8 February 2010)

Grand Slam doubles results
- Australian Open: 2R (2005)

Team competitions
- Fed Cup: 4–6

Anikó Kapros (born 11 November 1983) is a former professional tennis player from Hungary. She won the junior's singles title at the Australian Open in 2000.

Kapros caused an upset at the 2002 French Open, when she, as a qualifier, beat fifth seeded Justine Henin-Hardenne in the first round.

== Career ==
=== Early life ===
Her mother, Anikó Kéry, won a bronze medal in gymnastics at the Olympic Games in Munich 1972. When Kapros was two years old, she moved to the Bahamas where her parents worked as acrobats. She returned to Hungary at the age of nine.

=== Professional career ===
In the 2002 French Open, as a qualifier, she upset future four-time French Open champion Justine Henin in the first round, 4–6, 6–1, 6–0. Kapros' senior career has been marred by recurring knee injuries. Her biggest success at a WTA tournament came in September 2003 when she reached the final of the Japan Open in Tokyo, where she lost to Maria Sharapova. Her highest ranking in singles was world No. 44. Kapros was part of the Hungarian Olympics team in Athens in the year of 2004.

Retired in 2010 from professional tour, she is now the head coach and club director at Patak Party Tenisz Club in Budapest. Kapros is also the co-founder (partnering with Ágnes Szavay and Zsófia Gubacsi) of "Happy Tennis" - a company offering a special tennis program for schools and kindergartens in Hungary.

== WTA Tour finals ==
=== Singles: 1 (runner-up) ===
Result	Date	Championship	Surface	Opponent	Score
Loss	29 September 2003	Japan Open, Tokyo	Hard	(Russia) Maria Sharapova	6–2, 2–6, 6–7^{(5–7)}

== ITF Circuit finals ==
$75,000 tournaments
$50,000 tournaments
$25,000 tournaments

=== Singles (2–5) ===
Outcome	No.	Date	Tournament	Surface	Opponent	Score
Winner	1.	29 January 2001	Clearwater, United States	Hard	(Russia) Alina Jidkova	6–3, 6–2
Runner-up	2.	2 April 2001	Dubai, United Arab Emirates	Hard	(Greece) Eleni Daniilidou	4–6, 4–6
Winner	3.	28 May 2006	Beijing, China	Hard	(China) Xie Yanze	6–4, 6–2
Runner-up	4.	10 August 2008	Moscow, Russia	Clay	(Russia) Anna Lapushchenkova	1–5 ret.
Runner-up	5.	9 February 2009	Stockholm, Sweden	Hard (i)	(Germany) Tatjana Maria	3–6, 2–6
Runner-up	6.	28 September 2009	Las Vegas, United States	Hard	(Russia) Regina Kulikova	2–6, 2–6
Runner-up	7.	19 November 2009	Toronto, Canada	Hard	(Italy) Camila Giorgi	6–4, 4–6, 0–6

=== Doubles (4–0) ===
Outcome	No.	Date	Tournament	Surface	Partner	Opponents	Score
Winner	1.	16 March 2009	Cairo, Egypt	Clay	(Hungary) Katalin Marosi	(United States) Megan Moulton-Levy (Germany) Laura Siegemund	7–5, 6–3
Winner	2.	26 May 2009	Grado, Italy	Clay	(Austria) Sandra Klemenschits	(Argentina) Jorgelina Cravero (Georgia (country)) Anna Tatishvili	6–3, 6–0
Winner	3.	15 June 2009	Padua, Italy	Clay	(Austria) Sandra Klemenschits	(Italy) Elena Pioppo (Italy) Valentina Sulpizio	7–6^{(7–4)}, 6–1
Winner	4.	28 September 2009	Las Vegas, United States	Hard	(Argentina) Agustina Lepore	(United States) Kimberly Couts (United States) Lindsay Lee-Waters	6–2, 7–5

== Best Grand Slam results details ==
=== Singles ===
	Australian Open	
2004 Australian Open
Round	Opponent	Score
1R	(Russia) Nadia Petrova (10)	6–3, 6–3
2R	(Australia) Samantha Stosur (WC)	6–3, 6–1
3R	(Hungary) Petra Mandula	3–6, 6–3, 12–10
4R	(Colombia) Fabiola Zuluaga (32)	4–6, 2–6

	French Open	
2002 French Open (qualifier)
Round	Opponent	Score
Q1	(France) Sophie Erre (WC)	6–2, 6–1
Q2	(Germany) Sabine Klaschka	6–0, 6–3
Q3	(Chinese Taipei) Hsieh Su-wei	3–6, 6–1, 6–4
1R	(Belgium) Justine Henin (5)	4–6, 6–1, 6–0
2R	(France) Virginie Razzano	6–7^{(3–7)}, 7–6^{(7–1)}, 6–2
3R	(France) Mary Pierce (WC)	3–6, 0–6

	Wimbledon Championships	
2003 Wimbledon (qualifier)
Round	Opponent	Score
Q1	(United States) Shenay Perry	6–2, 5–7, 6–1
Q2	(Indonesia) Wynne Prakusya (7)	6–2, 6–4
Q3	(Romania) Andreea Vanc	6–2, 4–6, 6–4
1R	(United States) Meghann Shaughnessy (19)	6–3, 6–2
2R	(Slovakia) Martina Suchá (Q)	6–0, 6–4
3R	(Russia) Elena Dementieva (15)	3–6, 1–6

	US Open	
2001 US Open
Round	Opponent	Score
1R	(Slovenia) Katarina Srebotnik (Q)	1–6, 4–6
2003 US Open (qualifier)
Round	Opponent	Score
Q1	(United States) Jamea Jackson (WC)	6–1, 6–1
Q2	(Estonia) Kaia Kanepi	6–4, 6–2
Q3	(Romania) Jarmila Gajdošová	6–3, 6–2
1R	(Belgium) Justine Henin-Hardenne (2)	5–7, 3–6
2004 US Open
Round	Opponent	Score
1R	(Russia) Vera Dushevina	1–6, 3–6

=== Doubles ===
	Australian Open	
2005 Australian Open (Wildcard)
with (Serbia and Montenegro) Jelena Janković
Round	Opponents	Score
1R	(South Africa) Natalie Grandin / (Spain) Conchita Martínez Granados	7–6^{(7–4)}, 7–5
2R	(Chinese Taipei) Janet Lee / (China) Peng Shuai	6–7^{(3–7)}, 3–6
