= Ekaterina Dzehalevich =

Belarusian tennis player (born 1986)

Ekaterina Dzehalevich Кацярына Дзегалевіч
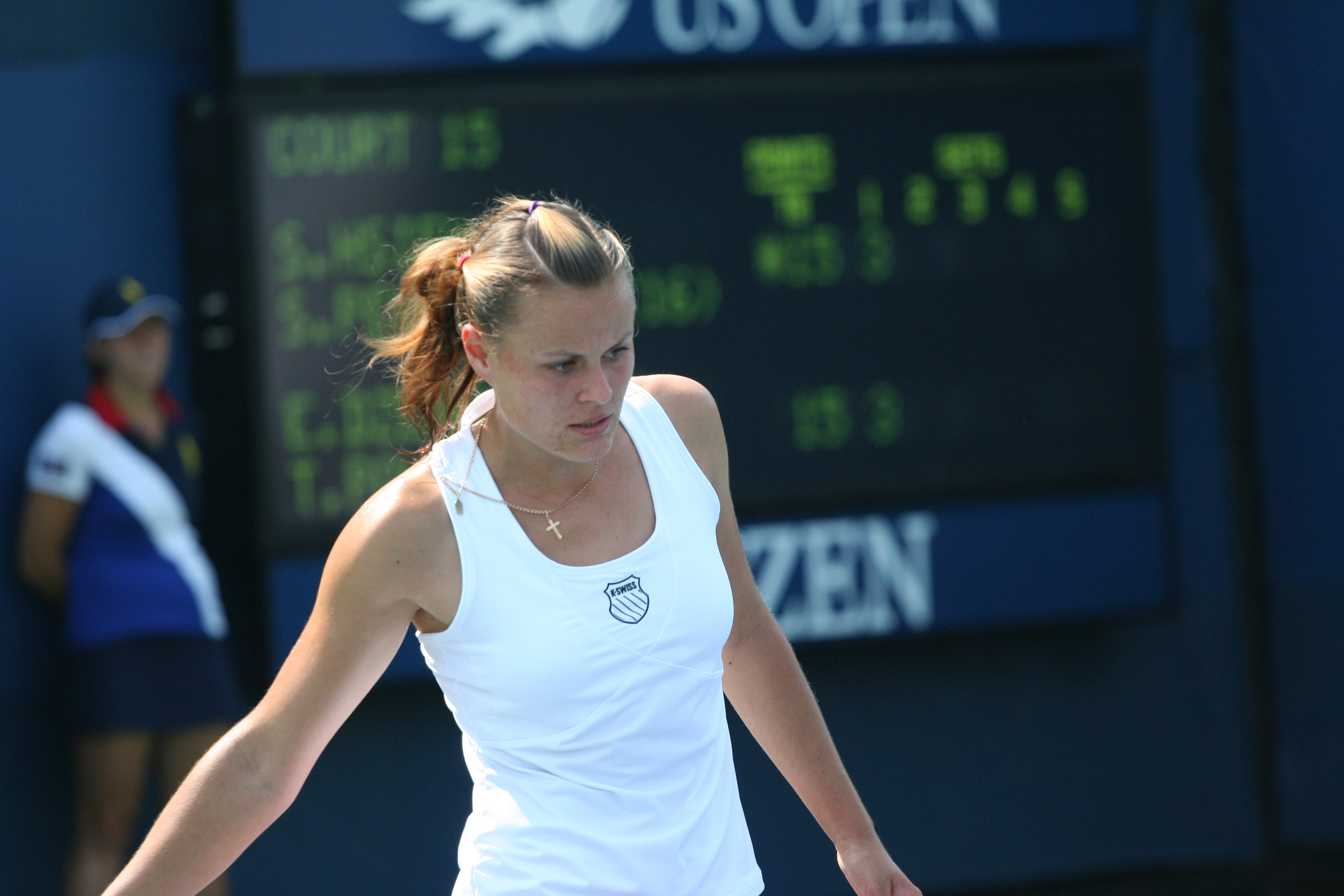
- Country (sports): Belarus
- Residence: Minsk, Belarus
- Born: 3 May 1986 (age 39); Minsk, Belarusian SSR, Soviet Union
- Height: 1.68 m (5 ft 6 in)
- Turned pro: 2001
- Plays: Right (two-handed backhand)
- Prize money: $369,291

Singles
- Career record: 262–196
- Career titles: 4 ITF
- Highest ranking: 134 (6 October 2008)

Grand Slam singles results
- Australian Open: Q2 (2010)
- French Open: Q2 (2008)
- Wimbledon: Q3 (2008)
- US Open: Q3 (2008)

Doubles
- Career record: 200–159
- Career titles: 1 WTA, 13 ITF
- Highest ranking: 64 (29 September 2008)

Grand Slam doubles results
- Australian Open: 1R (2009)
- French Open: 2R (2009)
- Wimbledon: 2R (2008, 2009)
- US Open: 2R (2008)

Team competitions
- Fed Cup: 8–6

Ekaterina Dzehalevich (Belarusian: Кацярына Міхайлаўна Дзегалевіч; Russian: Екатерина Михайловна Деголевич; born 3 May 1986) is a former professional Belarusian tennis player. Her career-high singles ranking is world No. 134, which she reached on 6 October 2008. Her highest in doubles is 64, which she reached on 29 September 2008.

In her career, Dzehalevich won four singles and 13 doubles titles on the ITF Women's Circuit. She was coached by her mother Tamara who also introduced her to tennis. Her last appearance was in the 2015 Neva Cup in Saint Petersburg.

== WTA career finals ==
=== Doubles: 2 (1–1) ===
| Before 2009 | Starting in 2009 |
|---|---|
Grand Slam tournaments (0/0)
| Tier I (0/0) | Premier Mandatory (0/0) |
| Tier II (0/0) | Premier 5 (0/0) |
| Tier III (0/0) | Premier (0/0) |
| Tier IV & V (0/0) | International (1/1) |

| Result | W–L | Date | Tournament | Surface | Partner | Opponents | Score |
|---|---|---|---|---|---|---|---|
| Win | 1–0 | Oct 2007 | Tashkent, Uzbekistan | Hard | (Belarus) Anastasiya Yakimova | (Belarus) Tatiana Poutchek (Australia) Anastassia Rodionova | 2–6, 6–4, [10–7] |
| Loss | 1–1 | Sep 2009 | Tashkent, Uzbekistan | Hard | (Russia) Vitalia Diatchenko | (Belarus) Tatiana Poutchek (Belarus) Olga Govortsova | 6–2, 6–7^{(1–7)}, [10–8] |

== ITF finals ==
=== Singles (4–9) ===
Legend
$100,000 tournaments
$75,000 tournaments
$50,000 tournaments
$25,000 tournaments
$10,000 tournaments

| Result | No. | Date | Tournament | Surface | Opponent | Score |
|---|---|---|---|---|---|---|
| Win | 1. | 5 April 2004 | Patras, Greece | Hard | (Germany) Martina Müller | 6–4, 6–4 |
| Win | 2. | 30 May 2004 | Olecko, Poland | Clay | (Poland) Olga Brózda | 4–6, 7–5, 6–4 |
| Loss | 1. | 15 May 2005 | Antalya, Turkey | Clay | (Romania) Monica Niculescu | 2–6, 2–6 |
| Loss | 2. | 25 June 2005 | Périgueux, France | Clay | (France) Virginie Pichet | 3–6, 6–7 |
| Loss | 3. | 29 October 2006 | Podolsk, Russia | Hard (i) | (Russia) Evgenia Grebenyuk | 5–7, 6–7 |
| Loss | 4. | 16 December 2006 | Dubai, U.A.E | Hard | (Ukraine) Kateryna Bondarenko | 1–6, 3–6 |
| Win | 3. | 15 March 2008 | New Delhi, India | Hard | (Belgium) Yanina Wickmayer | 2–6, 6–3, 6–2 |
| Loss | 5. | 29 March 2008 | Moscow, Russia | Hard (i) | (Russia) Anastasia Pavlyuchenkova | 0–6, 2–6 |
| Win | 4. | 6 July 2008 | Toruń, Poland | Clay | (Slovakia) Dominika Nociarová | 6–3, 2–6, 7–6^{(9–7)} |
| Loss | 6. | 3 August 2008 | Dnipropetrovsk, Ukraine | Clay | (Austria) Patricia Mayr-Achleitner | 3–6, 4–6 |
| Loss | 7. | 8 March 2009 | Fort Walton Beach, U.S. | Hard | (Venezuela) Gabriela Paz | 6–1, 4–6, 5–7 |
| Loss | 8. | 12 July 2009 | Biarritz, France | Clay | (Germany) Julia Görges | 5–7, 0–6 |
| Loss | 9. | 7 August 2010 | Astana, Kazakhstan | Hard | (Russia) Evgeniya Rodina | 6–4, 1–6, 4–6 |

=== Doubles (13-11) ===
| Result | No. | Date | Tournament | Surface | Partner | Opponents | Score |
|---|---|---|---|---|---|---|---|
| Win | 1. | 24 May 2003 | Olecko, Poland | Clay | (Australia) Michelle Summerside | (Poland) Alicja Rosolska (Poland) Monika Schneider | 6–2, 1–6, 6–4 |
| Loss | 1. | 27 November 2004 | Opole, Poland | Carpet (i) | (Belarus) Nadejda Ostrovskaya | (Czech Republic) Lucie Hradecká (Czech Republic) Eva Hrdinová | 5–7, 3–6 |
| Win | 2. | 24 September 2005 | Tbilisi, Georgia | Clay | (Belarus) Tatsiana Kapshai | (Poland) Karolina Kosińska (Belarus) Tatsiana Uvarova | 6–0, 7–5 |
| Win | 3. | 6 November 2005 | Minsk, Belarus | Carpet (i) | (Belarus) Darya Kustova | (Poland) Agnieszka Radwańska (Poland) Urszula Radwańska | 6–3, 6–3 |
| Loss | 2. | 12 March 2006 | Minsk, Belarus | Carpet (i) | (Belarus) Tatsiana Kapshai | (Belarus) Ima Bohush (Belarus) Darya Kustova | 6–1, 3–6, 4–6 |
| Win | 4. | 15 July 2006 | Toruń, Poland | Clay | (Slovenia) Andreja Klepač | (Romania) Edina Gallovits-Hall (Slovakia) Lenka Tvarošková | 7–6^{(7–5)}, 6–4 |
| Loss | 3. | 18 August 2006 | Rimini, Italy | Clay | (Russia) Ekaterina Lopes | (Bosnia and Herzegovina) Mervana Jugić-Salkić (Czech Republic) Gabriela Chmelinová | 3–6, 6–1, 2–6 |
| Loss | 4. | 28 October 2006 | Podolsk, Russia | Hard (i) | (Russia) Vasilisa Davydova | (Russia) Anastasia Pavlyuchenkova (Russia) Evgeniya Rodina | 1–6, 2–6 |
| Loss | 5. | 4 November 2006 | Minsk, Belarus | Carpet (i) | (Russia) Evgeniya Rodina | (Belarus) Darya Kustova (Russia) Ekaterina Makarova | 4–6, 4–6 |
| Loss | 6. | 31 March 2007 | Moscow, Russia | Hard (i) | (Russia) Arina Rodionova | (Russia) Alisa Kleybanova (Russia) Evgeniya Rodina | 6–7^{(2–7)}, 0–6 |
| Win | 5. | 14 April 2007 | Civitavecchia, Italy | Clay | (Ukraine) Mariya Koryttseva | (Belarus) Darya Kustova (Russia) Ekaterina Makarova | 7–6^{(8–6)}, 5–7, 6–1 |
| Win | 6. | 8 July 2007 | Stuttgart-Vaihingen, Germany | Clay | (Belgium) Yanina Wickmayer | (Croatia) Darija Jurak (Germany) Carmen Klaschka | 6–3, 6–2 |
| Win | 7. | 15 July 2007 | Darmstadt, Germany | Clay | (Romania) Monica Niculescu | (United States) Hilary Barte (Germany) Tatjana Priachin | 6–4, 7–5 |
| Loss | 7. | 21 July 2007 | Contrexéville, France | Clay | (Belarus) Ksenia Milevskaya | (Czech Republic) Renata Voráčová (Czech Republic) Barbora Záhlavová-Strýcová | 2–6, 2–6 |
| Win | 8. | 31 October 2008 | Nantes, France | Hard (i) | (Ukraine) Yuliana Fedak | (Croatia) Darija Jurak (Slovenia) Maša Zec Peškirič | 6–3, 6–4 |
| Loss | 8. | 7 March 2009 | Fort Walton Beach, U.S. | Hard | (Russia) Ekaterina Bychkova | (Russia) Alexandra Panova (Belarus) Tatiana Poutchek | 2–6, 2–6 |
| Win | 9. | 28 March 2009 | Moscow, Russia | Hard (i) | (Russia) Vitalia Diatchenko | (Ukraine) Lyudmyla Kichenok (Ukraine) Nadiia Kichenok | 6–1, 6–1 |
| Loss | 9. | 9 October 2009 | Jounieh, Lebanon | Clay | (Ukraine) Yuliana Fedak | (Ukraine) Mariya Koryttseva (Belarus) Darya Kustova | 3–6, 4–6 |
| Loss | 10. | 8 November 2009 | Ismaning, Germany | Carpet (i) | (Czech Republic) Eva Hrdinová | (Greece) Eleni Daniilidou (Germany) Jasmin Wöhr | 2–6, 6–4, [5–10] |
| Win | 10. | 14 May 2010 | Caserta, Italy | Clay | (France) Irena Pavlovic | (Italy) Nicole Clerico (Canada) Rebecca Marino | 6–3, 6–3 |
| Win | 11. | 14 August 2010 | Kazan, Russia | Hard | (Ukraine) Lesia Tsurenko | (Uzbekistan) Albina Khabibulina (Kyrgyzstan) Ksenia Palkina | 6–2, 6–3 |
| Loss | 11. | 29 September 2012 | Telavi, Georgia | Clay | (Georgia (country)) Oksana Kalashnikova | (Hungary) Réka Luca Jani (Germany) Christina Shakovets | 6–3, 4–6, [6–10] |
| Win | 12. | 9 November 2012 | Minsk, Belarus | Hard (i) | (Belarus) Aliaksandra Sasnovich | (Ukraine) Lyudmyla Kichenok (Ukraine) Nadiia Kichenok | 1–6, 6–2, [10–3] |
| Win | 13. | 28 December 2012 | St. Petersburg, Russia | Carpet (i) | (Russia) Alexandra Artamonova | (Russia) Yuliya Kalabina (Ukraine) Anastasiya Vasylyeva | 6–0, 6–2 |
