= Ima Bohush =

Belarusian tennis player (born 1990)

Ima Bohush Іма Богуш
- Full name: Ima Anatolevna Bohush
- Country (sports): Belarus
- Born: 2 August 1990 (age 34); Minsk, Soviet Union
- Prize money: $14,655

Singles
- Career record: 37–31
- Career titles: 0
- Highest ranking: 515 (15 September 2008)

Doubles
- Career record: 46–21
- Career titles: 4 ITF
- Highest ranking: 260 (21 September 2009)

Team competitions
- Fed Cup: 2–1

Ima Anatolevna Bohush (Belarusian: Іма Анатольеўна Богуш; born 2 August 1990 in Minsk) is a retired Belarusian tennis player.

Bohush won four doubles titles on the ITF tour in her career. On 15 September 2008, she reached her best singles ranking of world number 515. On 21 September 2009, she peaked at world number 260 in the doubles rankings.

Playing for Belarus at the Fed Cup, Bohush had a win–loss record of 2–1. (Note: Ima Bohush at the Billie Jean King Cup (archived))

== ITF finals (4–5) ==
=== Doubles (4–5) ===
Legend $100,000 tournaments $75,000 tournaments $50,000 tournaments $25,000 tournaments $15,000 tournaments $10,000 tournaments	Finals by surface Hard (1–2) Clay (1–1) Grass (0–0) Carpet (2–2)

Outcome	No.	Date	Tournament	Surface	Partner	Opponents	Score
Winner	1.	6 March 2006	Minsk, Belarus	Carpet (i)	(Belarus) Darya Kustova	(Belarus) Ekaterina Dzehalevich (Belarus) Tatsiana Kapshay	1–6, 6–3, 6–2
Runner-up	1.	3 March 2008	Minsk, Belarus	Carpet (i)	(Belarus) Ksenia Milevskaya	(Ukraine) Yuliya Beygelzimer (Russia) Anna Lapushchenkova	4–6, 5–7
Runner-up	2.	23 June 2008	Breda, Netherlands	Clay	(Ukraine) Lesia Tsurenko	(Netherlands) Daniëlle Harmsen (Netherlands) Renée Reinhard	w/o
Winner	2.	11 August 2008	Iława, Poland	Clay	(Slovakia) Romana Tabak	(South Africa) Lisa Marshall (Armenia) Anna Movsisyan	6–3, 6–2
Winner	3.	15 September 2008	Qarshi, Uzbekistan	Hard	(Ukraine) Lesia Tsurenko	(Uzbekistan) Albina Khabibulina (Uzbekistan) Alexandra Kolesnichenko	6–3, 6–1
Runner-up	3.	20 October 2008	Podolsk, Russia	Carpet (i)	(Belarus) Darya Kustova	(Russia) Anastasia Poltoratskaya (Ukraine) Lesia Tsurenko	6–7^{(7–9)}, 6–1, [3–10]
Winner	4.	2 March 2009	Minsk, Belarus	Carpet (i)	(Belarus) Darya Kustova	(Russia) Vitalia Diatchenko (Russia) Eugeniya Pashkova	6–1, 4–6, [10–8]
Runner-up	4.	30 March 2009	Antalya, Turkey	Hard	(Russia) Maria Zharkova	(Georgia (country)) Sofia Kvatsabaia (Russia) Avgusta Tsybysheva	4–6, 6–4, [8–10]
Runner-up	5.	20 April 2009	Almaty, Kazakhstan	Hard (i)	(Russia) Eugeniya Pashkova	(Ukraine) Tetyana Arefyeva (Ukraine) Anastasiya Lytovchenko	4–6, 4–6

== Fed Cup participation ==
=== Singles ===
Edition	Stage	Date	Location	Against	Surface	Opponent	W/L	Score
2008 Fed Cup; Europe/Africa Zone Group I	P/O	2 February 2008	Budapest, Hungary	Romania	Carpet (i)	(Romania) Monica Niculescu	L	0–6, 3–6

=== Doubles ===
Edition	Stage	Date	Location	Against	Surface	Partner	Opponents	W/L	Score
2008 Fed Cup; Europe/Africa Zone Group I	R/R	31 January 2008	Budapest, Hungary	Slovenia	Carpet (i)	(Belarus) Tatiana Poutchek	(Slovenia) Polona Hercog (Slovenia) Maša Zec Peškirič	W	6–1, 6–3
2008 Fed Cup; Europe/Africa Zone Group I	R/R	1 February 2008	Budapest, Hungary	Sweden	Carpet (i)	(Belarus) Tatiana Poutchek	(Sweden) Michaela Johansson (Sweden) Nadja Roma	W	6–4, 6–2
