= Marlot Meddens =

Dutch tennis player

- Full name: Marlot Meddens
- Country (sports): Netherlands
- Born: 21 April 1989 (age 35); Sassenheim, Netherlands
- Retired: 2010
- Prize money: $37,187

Singles
- Career record: 118–67
- Career titles: 5 ITF
- Highest ranking: No. 293 (20 July 2009)

Doubles
- Career record: 67–33
- Career titles: 9 ITF
- Highest ranking: No. 328 (12 October 2009)

Marlot Meddens (born 21 April 1989) is a former professional tennis player and Investment Manager from the Netherlands. On 20 July 2009, she reached her highest singles ranking of 293 by the Women's Tennis Association (WTA).

== Biography ==
Meddens comes from South Holland, born in Sassenheim her family is a tennis teacher at university. She starting playing tennis herself at the age of eight played Wimbledon and Roland Garros as a junior and became Dutch National Champion in 2008. Meddens studied econometrics and quantitative finance. After her tennis career, she is making a career as Slinghot Ventures Investment Manager.

She won five singles titles and nine doubles titles on the ITF Circuit in her career.

In 2009, Meddens has received the 2008 sports prize from the municipality of Teylingen.
