= 2012 ITF Women's Circuit =

2012 season of the ITF Women's tennis tour

Details
- Duration: 2 January – 30 December

Achievements (singles)

The 2012 ITF Women's Circuit was the 2012 edition of the second-tier tour for women's professional tennis. The ITF Women's Circuit is organised by the International Tennis Federation and is a tier below the WTA Tour. The 2012 season consisted of 484 events in 63 countries with prize money ranging from $10,000 up to $100,000.

== Statistical information ==
To avoid confusion and double counting, these tables should be updated only after the end of the week.

=== Key ===
$100,000 tournaments
$75,000 tournaments
$50,000 tournaments
$25,000 tournaments
$10,000 tournaments
All titles

=== Titles won by player ===
As of December 31.

Total	Player	$100K		$75K		$50K		$25K		$10K		Total	
Total	Player	S	D	S	D	S	D	S	D	S	D	S	D
12	Başak Eraydın (TUR)									7	5	7	5
11	Daniela Seguel (CHI)									4	7	4	7
9	Anastasia Grymalska (ITA)								2	2	5	2	7
8	Anna-Lena Friedsam (GER)							4		2	2	6	2
8	Kateřina Vaňková (CZE)									5	3	5	3
8	Ashleigh Barty (AUS)				1	1	1	3	2			4	4
8	Kateryna Kozlova (UKR)					1	1	2	4			3	5
8	Laura-Ioana Andrei (ROU)									3	5	3	5
8	María Irigoyen (ARG)						2	1	5			1	7
7	María Teresa Torró Flor (ESP)	2				1		4				7	0
7	Ana Savić (CRO)					1				6		7	0
7	Victoria Kan (RUS)									5	2	5	2
7	Margarita Gasparyan (RUS)							4	2		1	4	3
7	Cristina Dinu (ROU)							2		2	3	4	3
7	Andreea Mitu (ROU)							1		3	3	4	3
7	Marta Sirotkina (RUS)		1					2	3	1		3	4
7	Renata Voráčová (CZE)					1	3		1	2		3	4
7	Séverine Beltrame (FRA)		2				1	2	2			2	5
7	Yasmin Schnack (USA)				1		2		2	1	1	1	6
7	Marie-Ève Pelletier (CAN)						2	1	4			1	6
7	Arina Rodionova (RUS)						1	1	5			1	6
7	Daniëlle Harmsen (NED)								3	1	3	1	6
7	María Fernanda Álvarez Terán (BOL)								2	1	4	1	6
7	Yana Sizikova (RUS)									1	6	1	6
7	Mailen Auroux (ARG)						2		5			0	7
7	Elena Bogdan (ROU)						1		6			0	7
7	Katarzyna Piter (POL)						1		6			0	7
7	Diana Buzean (ROU)								3		4	0	7
7	Eugeniya Pashkova (RUS)								1		6	0	7
6	Annika Beck (GER)			3		1		2				6	0
6	Jovana Jakšić (SRB)									6		6	0
6	Maryna Zanevska (UKR)							2	1	3		5	1
6	Sara Sorribes Tormo (ESP)									4	2	4	2
6	Gabriela Paz (VEN)							1	1	2	2	3	3
6	Yuliya Kalabina (RUS)							1		2	3	3	3
6	Fernanda Brito (CHI)									3	3	3	3
6	Cecilia Costa Melgar (CHI)									3	3	3	3
6	Sofia Kvatsabaia (GEO)									3	3	3	3
6	Federica Di Sarra (ITA)							1	2	1	2	2	4
6	Chanel Simmonds (RSA)								4	2		2	4
6	Camila Silva (CHI)									2	4	2	4
6	Mervana Jugić-Salkić (BIH)		2				1	1	2			1	5
6	Lyudmyla Kichenok (UKR)						1	1	4			1	5
6	Nadiya Kichenok (UKR)						1	1	4			1	5
6	Anastasiya Vasylyeva (UKR)							1			5	1	5
6	Conny Perrin (SUI)								5	1		1	5
6	Ekaterine Gorgodze (GEO)								3	1	2	1	5
6	Olga Brózda (POL)									1	5	1	5
6	Tatiana Búa (ARG)									1	5	1	5
6	Laura Thorpe (FRA)		2						4			0	6
6	Shuko Aoyama (JPN)		1				2		3			0	6
6	Raluca Olaru (ROU)								6			0	6
6	Diāna Marcinkēviča (LAT)								4		2	0	6
6	Petra Krejsová (CZE)										6	0	6
5	Anna Karolína Schmiedlová (SVK)							2		3		5	0
5	Eugenie Bouchard (CAN)					1	1	1		2		4	1
5	Duan Yingying (CHN)							4			1	4	1
5	Estelle Guisard (FRA)							1		3	1	4	1
5	Timea Bacsinszky (SUI)		1					2	1	1		3	2
5	Amra Sadiković (SUI)				1			2		1	1	3	2
5	Sandra Zaniewska (POL)						1	3	1			3	2
5	Teliana Pereira (BRA)							3	1		1	3	2
5	Aliaksandra Sasnovich (BLR)							1	1	2	1	3	2
5	Venise Chan (HKG)								1	3	1	3	2
5	Tereza Smitková (CZE)								1	3	1	3	2
5	Patricia Kú Flores (PER)									3	2	3	2
5	Quirine Lemoine (NED)									3	2	3	2
5	Maria Sanchez (USA)			1		1	1		2			2	3
5	Zheng Saisai (CHN)					1	1	1	2			2	3
5	Karolína Plíšková (CZE)							2	3			2	3
5	Isabella Shinikova (BUL)								1	2	2	2	3
5	Manon Arcangioli (FRA)									2	3	2	3
5	Anaïs Laurendon (FRA)									2	3	2	3
5	Chantal Škamlová (SVK)									2	3	2	3
5	Magda Linette (POL)						2		2	1		1	4
5	Ulrikke Eikeri (NOR)								2	1	2	1	4
5	Natela Dzalamidze (RUS)								1	1	3	1	4
5	Oksana Kalashnikova (GEO)		1						3		1	0	5
5	Valentyna Ivakhnenko (UKR)						1		4			0	5
5	Lucia Butkovská (SVK)										5	0	5
5	Abbie Myers (AUS)										5	0	5
4	Wang Qiang (CHN)			1				1		2		4	0
4	Hsieh Su-wei (TPE)	2				1	1					3	1
4	Olivia Rogowska (AUS)		1					3				3	1
4	Sacha Jones (AUS)							3	1			3	1
4	Laura Siegemund (GER)							1		2	1	3	1
4	Vanesa Furlanetto (ARG)									3	1	3	1
4	Nao Hibino (JPN)									3	1	3	1
4	Ksenia Milevskaya (BLR)									3	1	3	1
4	Sharon Fichman (CAN)					1	1	1	1			2	2
4	Luksika Kumkhum (THA)							1	2	1		2	2
4	Lu Jiajing (CHN)							1		1	2	2	2
4	Miyabi Inoue (JPN)								1	2	1	2	2
4	Melanie Klaffner (AUT)								1	2	1	2	2
4	Ysaline Bonaventure (BEL)									2	2	2	2
4	Natalija Kostić (SRB)									2	2	2	2
4	Silvia Njirić (CRO)									2	2	2	2
4	Sandra Roma (SWE)									2	2	2	2
4	Vesna Dolonc (SRB)				2	1	1					1	3
4	Kristýna Plíšková (CZE)							1	3			1	3
4	Samantha Murray (GBR)							1			3	1	3
4	Gioia Barbieri (ITA)								1	1	2	1	3
4	Amy Bowtell (IRL)									1	3	1	3
4	Lina Gjorcheska (MKD)									1	3	1	3
4	Barbora Krejčíková (CZE)									1	3	1	3
4	Julia Mayr (ITA)									1	3	1	3
4	Teodora Mirčić (SRB)									1	3	1	3
4	Eduarda Piai (BRA)									1	3	1	3
4	Ankita Raina (IND)									1	3	1	3
4	Aranza Salut (ARG)									1	3	1	3
4	Jade Windley (GBR)									1	3	1	3
4	Sun Shengnan (CHN)				1		1		2			0	4
4	Jacqueline Cako (USA)				1				2		1	0	4
4	Monique Adamczak (AUS)						1		3			0	4
4	Sally Peers (AUS)						1		3			0	4
4	Xu Yifan (CHN)						1		2		1	0	4
4	Maria Fernanda Alves (BRA)						1		1		2	0	4
4	Paula Kania (POL)								3		1	0	4
4	Barbara Sobaszkiewicz (POL)								2		2	0	4
4	Anna Fitzpatrick (GBR)								1		3	0	4
4	Anamika Bhargava (USA)										4	0	4
4	Martina Borecká (CZE)										4	0	4
4	Carolin Daniels (GER)										4	0	4
4	Nikola Horáková (CZE)										4	0	4
4	Akari Inoue (JPN)										4	0	4
4	Sylvia Krywacz (USA)										4	0	4
4	Tereza Malíková (CZE)										4	0	4
4	Kaori Onishi (JPN)										4	0	4
4	Despina Papamichail (GRE)										4	0	4
4	Raluca Elena Platon (ROU)										4	0	4
4	Nicolette van Uitert (NED)										4	0	4
4	Alina Wessel (GER)										4	0	4
4	Ekaterina Yashina (RUS)										4	0	4
3	Kimiko Date-Krumm (JPN)			1		2						3	0
3	Grace Min (USA)					1		2				3	0
3	Nungnadda Wannasuk (THA)									3		3	0
3	Romina Oprandi (SUI)	1			1	1						2	1
3	Richèl Hogenkamp (NED)		1					1		1		2	1
3	Stefanie Vögele (SUI)			1	1			1				2	1
3	Madison Keys (USA)			1		1	1					2	1
3	Maria Elena Camerin (ITA)				1			1		1		2	1
3	Roxane Vaisemberg (BRA)							1		1	1	2	1
3	Belinda Bencic (SUI)									2	1	2	1
3	Jennifer Elie (USA)									2	1	2	1
3	Anett Kontaveit (EST)									2	1	2	1
3	Margarita Lazareva (RUS)									2	1	2	1
3	Jamie Loeb (USA)									2	1	2	1
3	Nicole Melichar (USA)									2	1	2	1
3	Ana Sofía Sánchez (MEX)									2	1	2	1
3	Patricia Maria Țig (ROU)									2	1	2	1
3	Marcela Zacarías (MEX)									2	1	2	1
3	Casey Dellacqua (AUS)				2	1						1	2
3	Irina Khromacheva (RUS)						1	1	1			1	2
3	Erika Sema (JPN)						1	1	1			1	2
3	Yuliya Beygelzimer (UKR)						1			1	1	1	2
3	Anna Zaja (GER)						1			1	1	1	2
3	Maša Zec Peškirič (SLO)							1	2			1	2
3	Myrtille Georges (FRA)								1	1	1	1	2
3	Julia Kimmelmann (GER)								1	1	1	1	2
3	Elyne Boeykens (BEL)									1	2	1	2
3	Lou Brouleau (FRA)									1	2	1	2
3	Elizabeth Ferris (USA)									1	2	1	2
3	Anastasia Kharchenko (UKR)									1	2	1	2
3	Natalia Kołat (POL)									1	2	1	2
3	Hiroko Kuwata (JPN)									1	2	1	2
3	Polina Monova (RUS)									1	2	1	2
3	Catalina Pella (ARG)									1	2	1	2
3	Laura Pigossi (BRA)									1	2	1	2
3	Melis Sezer (TUR)									1	2	1	2
3	Mari Tanaka (JPN)									1	2	1	2
3	Wang Yafan (CHN)									1	2	1	2
3	Wen Xin (CHN)									1	2	1	2
3	Dalia Zafirova (BUL)									1	2	1	2
3	Zuzana Zlochová (SVK)									1	2	1	2
3	Catalina Castaño (COL)		1				1		1			0	3
3	Liu Wanting (CHN)				1				2			0	3
3	Gabriela Dabrowski (CAN)						2		1			0	3
3	Elena Bovina (RUS)						1		2			0	3
3	Lenka Wienerová (SVK)						1		2			0	3
3	Réka-Luca Jani (HUN)						1		1		1	0	3
3	Christina Shakovets (GER)						1				2	0	3
3	Nicole Rottmann (AUT)								3			0	3
3	Sanaz Marand (USA)								2		1	0	3
3	Ayu Fani Damayanti (INA)								1		2	0	3
3	Eri Hozumi (JPN)								1		2	0	3
3	Jesika Malečková (CZE)								1		2	0	3
3	Lavinia Tananta (INA)								1		2	0	3
3	Diana Bogoliy (UKR)										3	0	3
3	Yvonne Cavallé Reimers (ESP)										3	0	3
3	Lucía Cervera Vázquez (ESP)										3	0	3
3	Macall Harkins (USA)										3	0	3
3	Yurina Koshino (JPN)										3	0	3
3	Lu Jiaxiang (CHN)										3	0	3
3	Karin Morgošová (SVK)										3	0	3
3	Alexandra Romanova (RUS)										3	0	3
3	Laëtitia Sarrazin (FRA)										3	0	3
3	Anna Smolina (RUS)										3	0	3
3	Karina Venditti (BRA)										3	0	3
3	Eveliina Virtanen (SWE)										3	0	3
3	Eva Wacanno (NED)										3	0	3
3	Caitlin Whoriskey (USA)										3	0	3
2	Monica Puig (PUR)	1				1						2	0
2	Yulia Putintseva (KAZ)	1						1				2	0
2	Mallory Burdette (USA)	1								1		2	0
2	Melanie Oudin (USA)					2						2	0
2	Lauren Davis (USA)					1		1				2	0
2	Mariana Duque (COL)					1			1			2	0
2	Anastasija Sevastova (LAT)					1		1				2	0
2	Elina Svitolina (UKR)					1		1				2	0
2	Kiki Bertens (NED)							2				2	0
2	Heidi El Tabakh (CAN)							2				2	0
2	Kirsten Flipkens (BEL)							2				2	0
2	Alexa Glatch (USA)							2				2	0
2	Sarah Gronert (GER)							2				2	0
2	Carina Witthöft (GER)							2				2	0
2	Kristína Kučová (SVK)							1		1		2	0
2	Danka Kovinić (MNE)							1		1		2	0
2	Dinah Pfizenmaier (GER)							1		1		2	0
2	Alison Van Uytvanck (BEL)							1		1		2	0
2	Sandra Záhlavová (CZE)							1		1		2	0
2	Olga Ianchuk (UKR)									2		2	0
2	Ksenia Kirillova (RUS)									2		2	0
2	Vojislava Lukić (SRB)									2		2	0
2	Iva Mekovec (CRO)									2		2	0
2	Piia Suomalainen (FIN)									2		2	0
2	Donna Vekić (CRO)									2		2	0
2	Urszula Radwańska (POL)		1	1								1	1
2	Julia Glushko (ISR)		1			1						1	1
2	Karin Knapp (ITA)		1			1						1	1
2	Shelby Rogers (USA)					1	1					1	1
2	Jessica Moore (AUS)						1			1		1	1
2	Madison Brengle (USA)							1	1			1	1
2	Chan Chin-wei (TPE)							1	1			1	1
2	Aleksandra Krunić (SRB)							1	1			1	1
2	Victoria Larrière (FRA)							1	1			1	1
2	Tadeja Majerič (SLO)							1	1			1	1
2	Florencia Molinero (ARG)							1	1			1	1
2	Arantxa Parra Santonja (ESP)							1	1			1	1
2	Jasmina Tinjić (BIH)							1	1			1	1
2	Zhao Yijing (CHN)							1	1			1	1
2	Rocío de la Torre Sánchez (ESP)								1	1		1	1
2	Chiaki Okadaue (JPN)								1	1		1	1
2	Akiko Yonemura (JPN)								1	1		1	1
2	Bianca Botto (PER)							1			1	1	1
2	Paula Cristina Gonçalves (BRA)							1			1	1	1
2	Anne Schäfer (GER)							1			1	1	1
2	Indire Akiki (CRO)									1	1	1	1
2	Ana Bogdan (ROU)									1	1	1	1
2	Ágnes Bukta (HUN)									1	1	1	1
2	Elena-Teodora Cadar (ROU)									1	1	1	1
2	Gabriela Cé (BRA)									1	1	1	1
2	Ana Clara Duarte (BRA)									1	1	1	1
2	Camelia Hristea (ROU)									1	1	1	1
2	Dalila Jakupović (SLO)									1	1	1	1
2	Nika Kukharchuk (RUS)									1	1	1	1
2	Yuliana Lizarazo (COL)									1	1	1	1
2	Anna Morgina (RUS)									1	1	1	1
2	Aleksandrina Naydenova (BUL)									1	1	1	1
2	Jeļena Ostapenko (LAT)									1	1	1	1
2	Jelena Pandžić (CRO)									1	1	1	1
2	Zarah Razafimahatratra (MAD)									1	1	1	1
2	Laura Schaeder (GER)									1	1	1	1
2	Sabina Sharipova (UZB)									1	1	1	1
2	Rishika Sunkara (IND)									1	1	1	1
2	Anna Tyulpa (RUS)									1	1	1	1
2	Alizé Cornet (FRA)		2									0	2
2	Caroline Garcia (FRA)		1						1			0	2
2	Janette Husárová (SVK)		1						1			0	2
2	Katalin Marosi (HUN)		1						1			0	2
2	Asia Muhammad (USA)				1		1					0	2
2	Natalie Pluskota (USA)				1				1			0	2
2	Alla Kudryavtseva (RUS)						2					0	2
2	Jessica Pegula (USA)						2					0	2
2	Julie Coin (FRA)						1		1			0	2
2	Hsieh Shu-ying (TPE)						1		1			0	2
2	Nicole Clerico (ITA)						1				1	0	2
2	Mihaela Buzărnescu (ROU)								2			0	2
2	Jana Čepelová (SVK)								2			0	2
2	Kumiko Iijima (JPN)								2			0	2
2	Justyna Jegiołka (POL)								2			0	2
2	Sandra Klemenschits (AUT)								2			0	2
2	Tatjana Malek (GER)								2			0	2
2	Junri Namigata (JPN)								2			0	2
2	Pemra Özgen (TUR)								2			0	2
2	Yurika Sema (JPN)								2			0	2
2	Valeria Solovyeva (RUS)								2			0	2
2	Alyona Sotnikova (UKR)								2			0	2
2	Melanie South (GBR)								2			0	2
2	Stephanie Vogt (LIE)								2			0	2
2	Varatchaya Wongteanchai (THA)								2			0	2
2	Ekaterina Dzehalevich (BLR)								1		1	0	2
2	Angelina Gabueva (RUS)								1		1	0	2
2	Nicola Geuer (GER)								1		1	0	2
2	Céline Ghesquière (FRA)								1		1	0	2
2	Kao Shao-yuan (TPE)								1		1	0	2
2	Martina Kubičíková (CZE)								1		1	0	2
2	Liang Chen (CHN)								1		1	0	2
2	Ksenia Lykina (RUS)								1		1	0	2
2	Peangtarn Plipuech (THA)								1		1	0	2
2	Kotomi Takahata (JPN)								1		1	0	2
2	Barbara Bonić (SRB)										2	0	2
2	Victoria Bosio (ARG)										2	0	2
2	Rushmi Chakravarthi (IND)										2	0	2
2	Alexandra Damaschin (ROU)										2	0	2
2	Nadia Echeverria Alam (USA)										2	0	2
2	Hülya Esen (TUR)										2	0	2
2	Lütfiye Esen (TUR)										2	0	2
2	Melina Ferrero (ARG)										2	0	2
2	Dianne Hollands (NZL)										2	0	2
2	Jasmina Kajtazovič (BIH)										2	0	2
2	Khristina Kazimova (UKR)										2	0	2
2	Albina Khabibulina (UZB)										2	0	2
2	Kim Kilsdonk (NED)										2	0	2
2	Ivette López (MEX)										2	0	2
2	Hilda Melander (SWE)										2	0	2
2	Angelica Moratelli (ITA)										2	0	2
2	Margarida Moura (POR)										2	0	2
2	Sviatlana Pirazhenka (BLR)										2	0	2
2	Dejana Raickovic (GER)										2	0	2
2	Isabella Robbiani (PAR)										2	0	2
2	Isabel Rapisarda Calvo (ESP)										2	0	2
2	Luciana Sarmenti (ARG)										2	0	2
2	Blair Shankle (USA)										2	0	2
2	Keren Shlomo (ISR)										2	0	2
2	Kyra Shroff (IND)										2	0	2
2	Remi Tezuka (JPN)										2	0	2
2	Lenka Tvarošková (SVK)										2	0	2
2	Joana Valle Costa (POR)										2	0	2
2	Zhang Kailin (CHN)										2	0	2
1	Lourdes Domínguez Lino (ESP)	1										1	0
1	Alexandra Dulgheru (ROU)	1										1	0
1	Olga Govortsova (BLR)	1										1	0
1	Maria João Koehler (POR)	1										1	0
1	Johanna Larsson (SWE)	1										1	0
1	Lucie Šafářová (CZE)	1										1	0
1	Aleksandra Wozniak (CAN)	1										1	0
1	Claire Feuerstein (FRA)					1						1	0
1	Nicole Gibbs (USA)					1						1	0
1	Camila Giorgi (ITA)					1						1	0
1	Monica Niculescu (ROU)					1						1	0
1	Aravane Rezaï (FRA)					1						1	0
1	Arantxa Rus (NED)					1						1	0
1	Julia Boserup (USA)							1				1	0
1	Verónica Cepede Royg (PAR)							1				1	0
1	Carly Gullickson (USA)							1				1	0
1	Zarina Diyas (KAZ)							1				1	0
1	Stéphanie Dubois (CAN)							1				1	0
1	Kazusa Ito (JPN)							1				1	0
1	Juan Ting-fei (TPE)							1				1	0
1	Katarzyna Kawa (POL)							1				1	0
1	Johanna Konta (GBR)							1				1	0
1	Michelle Larcher de Brito (POR)							1				1	0
1	Rebecca Marino (CAN)							1				1	0
1	Garbiñe Muguruza (ESP)							1				1	0
1	Adriana Pérez (VEN)							1				1	0
1	Laura Pous Tió (ESP)							1				1	0
1	Olga Puchkova (RUS)							1				1	0
1	Yaroslava Shvedova (KAZ)							1				1	0
1	Aki Yamasoto (JPN)							1				1	0
1	Fatma Al Nabhani (OMA)									1		1	0
1	Denisa Allertová (CZE)									1		1	0
1	Ani Amiraghyan (ARM)									1		1	0
1	Virginie Ayassamy (FRA)									1		1	0
1	Ulyana Ayzatulina (RUS)									1		1	0
1	Marie Benoît (BEL)									1		1	0
1	Prerna Bhambri (IND)									1		1	0
1	Iryna Brémond (FRA)									1		1	0
1	Yana Buchina (RUS)									1		1	0
1	Amanda Carreras (GBR)									1		1	0
1	Louisa Chirico (USA)									1		1	0
1	Anna Danilina (KAZ)									1		1	0
1	Julia Elbaba (USA)									1		1	0
1	Klára Fabíková (CZE)									1		1	0
1	Camila Giangreco Campiz (PAR)									1		1	0
1	Barbara Haas (AUT)									1		1	0
1	Beatriz Haddad Maia (BRA)									1		1	0
1	Amandine Hesse (FRA)									1		1	0
1	Mayo Hibi (JPN)									1		1	0
1	Katherine Ip (HKG)									1		1	0
1	Corina Jäger (SUI)									1		1	0
1	Ivana Jorović (SRB)									1		1	0
1	Zalina Khairudinova (KAZ)									1		1	0
1	Deniz Khazaniuk (ISR)									1		1	0
1	Andrea Koch Benvenuto (CHI)									1		1	0
1	Elizaveta Kulichkova (RUS)									1		1	0
1	Regina Kulikova (RUS)									1		1	0
1	Sabina Kurbanova (RUS)									1		1	0
1	Ofri Lankri (ISR)									1		1	0
1	Andrea Lázaro García (ESP)									1		1	0
1	Lee Pei-chi (TPE)									1		1	0
1	Lee So-ra (KOR)									1		1	0
1	Katharina Lehnert (GER)									1		1	0
1	Liu Chang (CHN)									1		1	0
1	Sabina Lupu (ROU)									1		1	0
1	Dana Machálková (CZE)									1		1	0
1	An-Sophie Mestach (BEL)									1		1	0
1	Lara Michel (SUI)									1		1	0
1	Guadalupe Moreno (ARG)									1		1	0
1	Yvonne Neuwirth (AUT)									1		1	0
1	Makoto Ninomiya (JPN)									1		1	0
1	Karolina Nowak (GER)									1		1	0
1	Justine Ozga (GER)									1		1	0
1	Marine Partaud (FRA)									1		1	0
1	Ganna Poznikhirenko (UKR)									1		1	0
1	Irina Ramialison (FRA)									1		1	0
1	Natalia Ryzhonkova (RUS)									1		1	0
1	Alice Savoretti (ITA)									1		1	0
1	Charlène Seateun (FRA)									1		1	0
1	Léa Tholey (FRA)									1		1	0
1	Viktoriya Tomova (BUL)									1		1	0
1	Nikola Vajdová (SVK)									1		1	0
1	Angelique van der Meet (NED)									1		1	0
1	Despoina Vogasari (GRE)									1		1	0
1	Kathinka von Deichmann (LIE)									1		1	0
1	Zhang Yuxuan (CHN)									1		1	0
1	Irina-Camelia Begu (ROU)		1									0	1
1	Chang Kai-chen (TPE)		1									0	1
1	Inés Ferrer Suárez (ESP)		1									0	1
1	Andrea Hlaváčková (CZE)		1									0	1
1	Lucie Hradecká (CZE)		1									0	1
1	Eva Hrdinová (CZE)		1									0	1
1	Mandy Minella (LUX)		1									0	1
1	Alexandra Panova (RUS)		1									0	1
1	Virginie Razzano (FRA)		1									0	1
1	Akgul Amanmuradova (UZB)				1							0	1
1	Eleni Daniilidou (GRE)				1							0	1
1	Vera Dushevina (RUS)				1							0	1
1	Stephanie Bengson (AUS)						1					0	1
1	Chan Hao-ching (TPE)						1					0	1
1	Samantha Crawford (USA)						1					0	1
1	Rika Fujiwara (JPN)						1					0	1
1	Han Xinyun (CHN)						1					0	1
1	Lindsay Lee-Waters (USA)						1					0	1
1	Mirjana Lučić (CRO)						1					0	1
1	Megan Moulton-Levy (USA)						1					0	1
1	Anastasia Rodionova (AUS)						1					0	1
1	Nigina Abduraimova (UZB)								1			0	1
1	Alice Balducci (ITA)								1			0	1
1	Cara Black (ZIM)								1			0	1
1	Çağla Büyükakçay (TUR)								1			0	1
1	Margalita Chakhnashvili (GEO)								1			0	1
1	Leticia Costas (ESP)								1			0	1
1	Corinna Dentoni (ITA)								1			0	1
1	Daria Gavrilova (RUS)								1			0	1
1	Tamaryn Hendler (BEL)								1			0	1
1	Hu Yueyue (CHN)								1			0	1
1	Veronika Kapshay (UKR)								1			0	1
1	Miyu Kato (JPN)								1			0	1
1	Elitsa Kostova (BUL)								1			0	1
1	Kateřina Kramperová (CZE)								1			0	1
1	Darya Kustova (BLR)								1			0	1
1	Noppawan Lertcheewakarn (THA)								1			0	1
1	Nicha Lertpitaksinchai (THA)								1			0	1
1	Antonia Lottner (GER)								1			0	1
1	Anna Arina Marenko (RUS)								1			0	1
1	Mai Minokoshi (JPN)								1			0	1
1	Miki Miyamura (JPN)								1			0	1
1	Tereza Mrdeža (CRO)								1			0	1
1	Polina Pekhova (BLR)								1			0	1
1	Olga Savchuk (UKR)								1			0	1
1	Bibiane Schoofs (NED)								1			0	1
1	Demi Schuurs (NED)								1			0	1
1	Sofia Shapatava (GEO)								1			0	1
1	Romana Tabak (SVK)								1			0	1
1	Ana Vrljić (CRO)								1			0	1
1	Ashley Weinhold (USA)								1			0	1
1	Kathrin Wörle (GER)								1			0	1
1	Jan Abaza (USA)										1	0	1
1	Aishwarya Agrawal (IND)										1	0	1
1	Lauren Albanese (USA)										1	0	1
1	Arantxa Andrady (IND)										1	0	1
1	Alexandra Artamonova (RUS)										1	0	1
1	Sabina Bamburac (GBR)										1	0	1
1	Karen Barbat (DEN)										1	0	1
1	Donika Bashota (SWE)										1	0	1
1	Sherazad Benamar (FRA)										1	0	1
1	Andrea Benítez (ARG)										1	0	1
1	Michaela Boev (BEL)										1	0	1
1	Jazmín Britos (PAR)										1	0	1
1	Lucy Brown (GBR)										1	0	1
1	Giulia Bruzzone (ITA)										1	0	1
1	Tyra Calderwood (AUS)										1	0	1
1	María Andrea Cárdenas (VEN)										1	0	1
1	Amandine Cazeaux (FRA)										1	0	1
1	Choi Ji-hee (KOR)										1	0	1
1	Erin Clark (USA)										1	0	1
1	Benedetta Davato (ITA)										1	0	1
1	Ana Paula de la Peña (MEX)										1	0	1
1	Justine De Sutter (BEL)										1	0	1
1	Laura Deigman (GBR)										1	0	1
1	Simona Dobrá (CZE)										1	0	1
1	Pilar Domínguez López (ESP)										1	0	1
1	Olga Doroshina (RUS)										1	0	1
1	Aveta Dvořáková (CZE)										1	0	1
1	Malou Ejdesgaard (DEN)										1	0	1
1	Emily Fanning (NZL)										1	0	1
1	Varvara Flink (RUS)										1	0	1
1	Alona Fomina (UKR)										1	0	1
1	Carla Forte (BRA)										1	0	1
1	Nikola Fraňková (CZE)										1	0	1
1	Anastasia Frolova (RUS)										1	0	1
1	Camila Fuentes (USA)										1	0	1
1	Giulia Gatto-Monticone (ITA)										1	0	1
1	Claudia Giovine (ITA)										1	0	1
1	Nadezda Gorbachkova (RUS)										1	0	1
1	Kim Grajdek (GER)										1	0	1
1	Risa Hasegawa (JPN)										1	0	1
1	Emma Hayman (NZL)										1	0	1
1	Ximena Hermoso (MEX)										1	0	1
1	Yuka Higuchi (JPN)										1	0	1
1	Tereza Hladíková (CZE)										1	0	1
1	Michaela Hončová (SVK)										1	0	1
1	Chieh-Yu Hsu (USA)										1	0	1
1	Huỳnh Phương Đài Trang (VIE)										1	0	1
1	Elizaveta Ianchuk (UKR)										1	0	1
1	Maiko Inoue (JPN)										1	0	1
1	Jana Jandová (CZE)										1	0	1
1	Whitney Jones (USA)										1	0	1
1	Lenka Juríková (SVK)										1	0	1
1	Kim Hae-sung (KOR)										1	0	1
1	Kim Ji-young (KOR)										1	0	1
1	Kim Ju-eun (KOR)										1	0	1
1	Kim Na-ri (KOR)										1	0	1
1	Kim Sun-jung (KOR)										1	0	1
1	Lynn Kiro (RSA)										1	0	1
1	Xenia Knoll (SUI)										1	0	1
1	Liz Tatiane Koehler Bogarin (BRA)										1	0	1
1	Franziska König (GER)										1	0	1
1	Neda Koprčina (CRO)										1	0	1
1	Oleksandra Korashvili (UKR)										1	0	1
1	Sofiya Kovalets (UKR)										1	0	1
1	Darya Lebesheva (BLR)										1	0	1
1	Lee Hua-chen (TPE)										1	0	1
1	Lee Ye-ra (KOR)										1	0	1
1	Li Ting (CHN)										1	0	1
1	Li Yihong (CHN)										1	0	1
1	Victoria Lozano (MEX)										1	0	1
1	Vanda Lukács (HUN)										1	0	1
1	Viktória Maľová (SVK)										1	0	1
1	Lidziya Marozava (BLR)										1	0	1
1	Sandra Martinović (BIH)										1	0	1
1	Beatriz Maria Martins Cecato (BRA)										1	0	1
1	Maria Masini (ITA)										1	0	1
1	Ester Masuri (ISR)										1	0	1
1	Evelyn Mayr (ITA)										1	0	1
1	Chiara Mendo (ITA)										1	0	1
1	Paulina Milosavljevic (SWE)										1	0	1
1	Brandy Mina (FRA)										1	0	1
1	Katherine Miranda Chang (PER)										1	0	1
1	Yumi Miyazaki (JPN)										1	0	1
1	Beatriz Morales Hernández (ESP)										1	0	1
1	Yuka Mori (JPN)										1	0	1
1	Julia Moriarty (AUS)										1	0	1
1	Alice Moroni (ITA)										1	0	1
1	Emi Mutaguchi (JPN)										1	0	1
1	Alexandra Nancarrow (AUS)										1	0	1
1	Ayumi Oka (JPN)										1	0	1
1	Giulia Pairone (ITA)										1	0	1
1	Nuria Párrizas Díaz (ESP)										1	0	1
1	Guadalupe Pérez Rojas (ARG)										1	0	1
1	Raquel Piltcher (BRA)										1	0	1
1	Michaela Pochabová (SVK)										1	0	1
1	Karla Popović (CRO)										1	0	1
1	Gabriela Porubin (MDA)										1	0	1
1	Anja Prislan (SLO)										1	0	1
1	Ekaterina Pushkareva (RUS)										1	0	1
1	Federica Quercia (ITA)										1	0	1
1	Alice-Andrada Radu (ROU)										1	0	1
1	Polona Reberšak (SLO)										1	0	1
1	Beatriz Ríos (MEX)										1	0	1
1	Paula Catalina Robles García (COL)										1	0	1
1	Nastassia Rubel (BLR)										1	0	1
1	Zoë Gwen Scandalis (USA)										1	0	1
1	Jade Schoelink (NED)										1	0	1
1	Sarah-Rebecca Sekulic (GER)										1	0	1
1	Anna Shkudun (UKR)										1	0	1
1	Natalia Siedliska (POL)										1	0	1
1	Kateřina Siniaková (CZE)										1	0	1
1	Nicola Slater (GBR)										1	0	1
1	İpek Soylu (TUR)										1	0	1
1	Milana Špremo (SRB)										1	0	1
1	Julia Stamatova (BUL)										1	0	1
1	Katerina Stewart (USA)										1	0	1
1	Giulia Sussarello (ITA)										1	0	1
1	Sara Sussarello (ITA)										1	0	1
1	Erika Takao (JPN)										1	0	1
1	Yuuki Tanaka (JPN)										1	0	1
1	Anouk Tigu (NED)										1	0	1
1	Janina Toljan (AUT)										1	0	1
1	Ekaterina Tour (ISR)										1	0	1
1	Kanami Tsuji (JPN)										1	0	1
1	Andreea Văideanu (ITA)										1	0	1
1	Bernice van de Velde (NED)										1	0	1
1	Jaimy-Gayle van de Wal (NED)										1	0	1
1	Ingrid Várgas Calvo (PER)										1	0	1
1	Hirono Watanabe (JPN)										1	0	1
1	Emily Webley-Smith (GBR)										1	0	1
1	Karolina Wlodarczak (AUS)										1	0	1
1	Varunya Wongteanchai (THA)										1	0	1
1	Yoo Mi (KOR)										1	0	1
1	Yu Min-hwa (KOR)										1	0	1
1	Yang Zhaoxuan (CHN)										1	0	1
1	Sylwia Zagórska (POL)										1	0	1
1	Marianna Zakarlyuk (UKR)										1	0	1
1	Carolina Zeballos (ARG)										1	0	1

- Diana Buzean (previously known as Diana Enache)

=== Titles won by nation ===
As of December 31.

Total	Nation	$100K		$75K		$50K		$25K		$10K		Total	
Total	Nation	S	D	S	D	S	D	S	D	S	D	S	D
96	Russia (RUS)	1	2		1		5	11	15	24	38	36	61
67	United States (USA)	1		2	2	8	7	8	6	11	22	30	37
53	Germany (GER)			3		1	2	13	5	11	18	28	25
53	Ukraine (UKR)					2	3	8	14	8	18	18	35
52	Czech Republic (CZE)	1	2			1	3	4	6	15	20	21	31
50	Romania (ROU)	1	1			1	2	3	11	13	18	18	32
49	Japan (JPN)		1	1		2	3	3	11	11	17	17	32
47	France (FRA)		5			2	1	4	8	16	11	22	25
39	Italy (ITA)		1		1	2	1	2	5	7	20	11	28
37	China (CHN)			1	1	1	3	8	7	7	9	17	20
34	Australia (AUS)		1		2	2	4	10	6	1	8	13	21
32	Slovakia (SVK)		1				1	3	4	8	15	11	21
32	Argentina (ARG)						2	2	5	7	16	9	23
31	Netherlands (NED)		1			1		3	5	6	15	10	21
31	Poland (POL)		1	1			2	4	11	2	10	7	24
29	Spain (ESP)	3	1			1		6	2	6	10	16	13
27	Chile (CHI)									13	14	13	14
27	Brazil (BRA)						1	4	3	6	13	10	17
26	Switzerland (SUI)	1	1	1	2	1		5	6	7	2	15	11
26	Serbia (SRB)				2	1	1	1	1	12	8	14	12
23	Croatia (CRO)					1	1	2	2	12	5	15	8
21	Canada (CAN)	1				2	5	7	4	2		12	9
18	Belarus (BLR)	1						1	3	5	8	7	11
16	Belgium (BEL)							3	1	6	6	9	7
16	Turkey (TUR)								2	7	7	7	9
16	Great Britain (GBR)							1	3	2	10	3	13
14	Georgia (GEO)		1						6	4	3	4	10
13	Chinese Taipei (TPE)	2	1			1	2	1	3	2	1	6	7
13	Bulgaria (BUL)								2	5	6	5	8
12	Austria (AUT)								6	4	2	4	8
11	Bosnia and Herzegovina (BIH)		2		1			2	3		3	2	9
10	Thailand (THA)							1	4	4	1	5	5
10	Mexico (MEX)									4	6	4	6
10	Latvia (LAT)					1		1	4	1	3	3	7
9	Peru (PER)							1		3	5	4	5
9	Sweden (SWE)	1								2	6	3	6
9	Slovenia (SLO)							2	3	1	3	3	6
9	India (IND)									3	6	3	6
8	Venezuela (VEN)							2	1	2	3	4	4
8	Colombia (COL)		1		1	1		1	1	1	2	3	5
8	Hungary (HUN)		1				1		2	1	3	1	7
7	Israel (ISR)		1			1				2	3	3	4
7	South Africa (RSA)								4	2	1	2	5
7	Bolivia (BOL)								2	1	4	1	6
6	Hong Kong (HKG)								1	4	1	4	2
6	Uzbekistan (UZB)				1				1	1	3	1	5
6	Greece (GRE)				1					1	4	1	5
6	South Korea (KOR)									1	5	1	5
5	Norway (NOR)								2	1	2	1	4
5	Ireland (IRL)									1	4	1	4
4	Kazakhstan (KAZ)							2		2		4	0
4	Portugal (POR)	1						1			2	2	2
4	Paraguay (PAR)							1		1	2	2	2
4	Macedonia (MKD)									1	3	1	3
4	New Zealand (NZL)										4	0	4
3	Estonia (EST)									2	1	2	1
3	Liechtenstein (LIE)								2	1		1	2
3	Indonesia (INA)								1		2	0	3
2	Puerto Rico (PUR)	1				1						2	0
2	Montenegro (MNE)							1		1		2	0
2	Finland (FIN)									2		2	0
2	Madagascar (MAD)									1	1	1	1
2	Denmark (DEN)										2	0	2
1	Armenia (ARM)									1		1	0
1	Oman (OMA)									1		1	0
1	Luxembourg (LUX)		1									0	1
1	Zimbabwe (ZIM)								1			0	1
1	Moldova (MDA)										1	0	1
1	Vietnam (VIE)										1	0	1

- Johanna Konta started representing Great Britain in June, she won one title while representing Australia.
- Yulia Putintseva started representing Kazakhstan in June, she won two titles while representing Russia.
- Julia Moriarty started representing Australia in August, she won one title while representing Ireland.

== Retirements ==
Player	Born	Highest singles/doubles ranking	ITF titles in singles+doubles	Reason
(United States) Kimberly Couts	9 May 1989	259/157	1+6	—
(Australia) Sophie Ferguson	19 March 1986	109/148	3+6	—
(Japan) Ryōko Fuda	25 October 1986	143/144	4+7	—
(Cuba) Misleydis Díaz González	23 August 1988	861/649	0+4	—
(Czech Republic) Simona Dobrá	24 June 1987	514/241	2+21	—
(Czech Republic) Iveta Gerlová	14 June 1984	345/218	9+31	—
(Russia) Maria Goloviznina	05 June 1979	135/139	2+5	—
(Russia) Nadejda Guskova	10 January 1992	301/249	2+4	—
(Russia) Ivanna Israilova	04 February 1986	417/313	0+2	—
(Argentina) María José Argeri	16 July 1984	149/105	10+25	—
(Czech Republic) Lucie Kriegsmannová	7 March 1985	430/219	5+31	—
(Argentina) Agustina Lepore	8 September 1988	227/239	6+10	—
(Algeria) Samia Medjahdi	6 January 1985	730/505	0+1	—

== Ranking Distribution ==
Description	W	F	SF	QF	R16	R32	QLFR	Q3	Q2	Q1
ITF $100,000 + H(S)	150	110	80	40	20	1	6	4	1	–
ITF $100,000 + H(D)	150	110	80	40	1	–	–	–	–	–
ITF $100,000 (S)	140	100	70	36	18	1	6	4	1	–
ITF $100,000 (D)	140	100	70	36	1	–	–	–	–	–
ITF $75,000 + H(S)	130	90	58	32	16	1	6	4	1	–
ITF $75,000 + H(D)	130	90	58	32	1	–	–	–	–	–
ITF $75,000 (S)	110	78	50	30	14	1	6	4	1	–
ITF $75,000 (D)	110	78	50	30	1	–	–	–	–	–
ITF $50,000 + H(S)	90	64	40	24	12	1	6	4	1	–
ITF $50,000 + H(D)	90	64	40	24	1	–	–	–	–	–
ITF $50,000 (S)	70	50	32	18	10	1	6	4	1	–
ITF $50,000 (D)	70	50	32	18	1	–	–	–	–	–
ITF $25,000 (S)	50	34	24	14	8	1	1	–	–	–
ITF $25,000 (D)	50	34	24	14	1	–	–	–	–	–
ITF $15,000 (S)	20	15	11	8	1	–	–	–	–	–
ITF $15,000 (D)	20	15	11	1	0	–	–	–	–	–
ITF $10,000 (S)	12	8	6	4	1	–	–	–	–	–
ITF $10,000 (D)	12	8	6	1	0	–	–	–	–	–

"+H" indicates that Hospitality is provided.

== See also ==
- 2012 WTA Tour
- 2012 WTA Challenger Tour
- 2012 ATP World Tour
- 2012 ATP Challenger Tour
- 2012 ITF Men's Circuit
- Women's Tennis Association
- International Tennis Federation
