= 2011 Smart Card Open Monet+ =

- Date: 6–12 June
- Edition: 5th
- Category: ITF Women's Circuit
- Prize money: $50,000+H
- Surface: Clay
- Location: Zlín, Czech Republic

Champions

Singles
- (Austria) Patricia Mayr-Achleitner

Doubles
- (Ukraine) Yuliya Beygelzimer / (Georgia (country)) Margalita Chakhnashvili
- Smart Card Open Monet+

The 2011 Smart Card Open Monet+ was a professional tennis tournament played on outdoor clay courts. It was part of the 2011 ITF Women's Circuit, offering a total of $50,000+H in prize money. It took place in Zlín, Czech Republic, on 6–12 June 2011.

== Singles entrants ==
=== Seeds ===
Nationality	Player	Ranking*	Seeding
RUS	Ksenia Pervak	87	1
AUT	Patricia Mayr-Achleitner	112	2
RUS	Ekaterina Ivanova	150	3
UKR	Yuliya Beygelzimer	177	4
POL	Magda Linette	180	5
BUL	Elitsa Kostova	189	7
ROU	Alexandra Cadanțu	192	8
CAN	Heidi El Tabakh	193	6

- Rankings as of 23 May 2011

=== Other entrants ===
The following players received wildcards into the singles main draw:

- (Czech Republic) Denisa Allertová
- (Czech Republic) Kateřina Klapková
- (Czech Republic) Kateřina Kramperová
- (Czech Republic) Martina Kubičíková

The following players received entry from the qualifying draw:

- (Russia) Yuliya Kalabina
- (Slovakia) Zuzana Luknárová
- (Lithuania) Lina Stančiūtė
- (Slovakia) Zuzana Zlochová

The following player received entry into the singles main draw as a lucky loser:

- (Latvia) Diāna Marcinkēviča

== Champions ==
=== Singles ===
- (Austria) Patricia Mayr-Achleitner def. (Russia) Ksenia Pervak 6–1, 6–0

=== Doubles ===
- (Ukraine) Yuliya Beygelzimer / (Georgia (country)) Margalita Chakhnashvili def. (Hungary) Réka-Luca Jani / (Hungary) Katalin Marosi 3–6, 6–1, [10–8]
