= 2011 Smart Card Open Monet+ – Doubles =

Doubles
- 2011 Smart Card Open Monet+

Final
- Champions: (Ukraine) Yuliya Beygelzimer (Georgia (country)) Margalita Chakhnashvili
- Runners-up: (Hungary) Réka-Luca Jani (Hungary) Katalin Marosi
- Score: 3–6, 6–1, [10–8]

Events
Singles	Doubles
- Smart Card Open Monet+

Eva Birnerová and Stéphanie Foretz Gacon were the defending champions, having won the event in 2010, but chose not to compete in 2011.

Yuliya Beygelzimer and Margalita Chakhnashvili won the tournament, defeating Réka-Luca Jani and Katalin Marosi in the final, 3–6, 6–1, [10–8].

== Seeds ==
1. (Ukraine) Lyudmyla Kichenok / (Ukraine) Nadiya Kichenok (quarterfinals)
2. (Czech Republic) Iveta Gerlová / (Czech Republic) Lucie Kriegsmannová (first round)
3. (Ukraine) Irina Buryachok / (Slovakia) Lenka Wienerová (quarterfinals)
4. (Russia) Ekaterina Ivanova / (Bulgaria) Elitsa Kostova (first round)

== Draw ==
Key

- Q = Qualifier
- WC = Wild card
- LL = Lucky loser
- Alt = Alternate
- ITF = ITF entry
- PR = Protected ranking
- SR = Special ranking
- SE = Special exempt
- JE = Junior exempt
- JR = Junior Accelerator Programme entrant
- CO = College Accelerator Programme entrant
- NG = Next Gen Accelerator Program entrant
- w/o = Walkover
- r = Retired
- d = Defaulted

First round
(Serbia) A Krunić (Russia) K Pervak
(Poland) M Linette (Poland) B Sobaszkiewicz	w/o
3	(Ukraine) I Buryachok (Slovakia) L Wienerová	6	6
(Czech Republic) T Hejlová (Czech Republic) P Krejsová	1	0
(Poland) O Brózda (Poland) N Kołat	3	6	[10]
(Ukraine) Y Beygelzimer (Georgia (country)) M Chakhnashvili	6	4	[12]
(Czech Republic) M Kubičíková (Czech Republic) D Machálková	5	3
(Czech Republic) T Hladíková (Slovakia) M Pochabová	7	6
(Russia) Y Kalabina (Russia) E Pashkova	7^{7}	4	[11]
4	(Russia) E Ivanova (Bulgaria) E Kostova	6^{5}	6	[9]
(Czech Republic) H Birnerová (Czech Republic) M Borecká	3	6	[10]
(Romania) A Cadanțu (Canada) H El Tabakh	6	4	8
(Hungary) R-L Jani (Hungary) K Marosi	3	6	[10]
2	(Czech Republic) Iveta Gerlová (Czech Republic) Lucie Kriegsmannová	6	3	[5]

Quarterfinals
1	(Ukraine) L Kichenok (Ukraine) N Kichenok	0	6	[7]
(Poland) M Linette (Poland) B Sobaszkiewicz	6	1	[10]
3	(Ukraine) I Buryachok (Slovakia) L Wienerová	4	1
(Ukraine) Y Beygelzimer (Georgia (country)) M Chakhnashvili	6	6
(Czech Republic) T Hladíková (Slovakia) M Pochabová	1	6^{3}
(Russia) Y Kalabina (Russia) E Pashkova	6	7^{7}
(Czech Republic) H Birnerová (Czech Republic) M Borecká	2	4
(Hungary) R-L Jani (Hungary) K Marosi	6	6

Semifinals
(Poland) M Linette (Poland) B Sobaszkiewicz	3	1
(Ukraine) Y Beygelzimer (Georgia (country)) M Chakhnashvili	6	6
(Russia) Y Kalabina (Russia) E Pashkova	5	1
(Hungary) R-L Jani (Hungary) K Marosi	7	6

Finals
(Ukraine) Y Beygelzimer (Georgia (country)) M Chakhnashvili	3	6	[10]
(Hungary) R-L Jani (Hungary) K Marosi	6	1	[8]
