= Smart Card Open Monet+ =

ITF Women's Tour
- Event name: Zlín
- Location: Zlín, Czech Republic
- Venue: TK SK Zlín
- Category: ITF Women's Circuit
- Surface: Clay (outdoor)
- Draw: 32S/32Q/16D
- Prize money: $25,000

The Smart Card Open Monet+ was a tournament for professional female tennis players played on clay courts. The event was classified as a $25,000 ITF Women's Circuit tournament, but has had a larger prize fund in previous years. It was held in Zlín, Czech Republic, from 2007 to 2013.

== Past finals ==
=== Singles ===
Year	Champion	Runner-up	Score
2013	(Austria) Melanie Klaffner	(Slovakia) Kristína Kučová	6–3, 6–2
2012	(Spain) María Teresa Torró Flor	(Bosnia and Herzegovina) Jasmina Tinjić	6–1, 1–6, 6–1
2011	(Austria) Patricia Mayr-Achleitner	(Russia) Ksenia Pervak	6–1, 6–0
2010	(Austria) Patricia Mayr	(Italy) Corinna Dentoni	6–1, 6–2
2009	(Slovenia) Polona Hercog	(Slovakia) Zuzana Kučová	6–3, 6–1
2008	(Germany) Anna-Lena Grönefeld	(Croatia) Jelena Kostanić Tošić	6–3, 4–6, 6–1
2007	(Czech Republic) Klára Zakopalová	(Czech Republic) Petra Kvitová	6–4, 6–1

=== Doubles ===
Year	Champions	Runners-up	Score
2013	(Czech Republic) Martina Borecká (Czech Republic) Tereza Smitková	(Poland) Paula Kania (Poland) Katarzyna Piter	6–1, 5–7, [10–8]
2012	(Bulgaria) Elitsa Kostova (Bosnia and Herzegovina) Jasmina Tinjić	(Paraguay) Verónica Cepede Royg (Brazil) Teliana Pereira	4–6, 6–1, [10–8]
2011	(Ukraine) Yuliya Beygelzimer (Georgia (country)) Margalita Chakhnashvili	(Hungary) Réka-Luca Jani (Hungary) Katalin Marosi	3–6, 6–1, [10–8]
2010	(Czech Republic) Eva Birnerová (France) Stéphanie Foretz	(Czech Republic) Tereza Hladíková (Slovakia) Michaela Pochabová	7–5, 4–6, [10–6]
2009	(Slovakia) Kristína Kučová (Slovakia) Zuzana Kučová	(Czech Republic) Nikola Fraňková (Germany) Carmen Klaschka	6–3, 6–4
2008	(Czech Republic) Simona Dobrá (Czech Republic) Tereza Hladíková	(Czech Republic) Lucie Hradecká (Czech Republic) Renata Voráčová	6–4, 6–3
2007	(Czech Republic) Lucie Hradecká (Czech Republic) Renata Voráčová	(Czech Republic) Michaela Paštiková (Czech Republic) Hana Šromová	6–2, 4–6, 6–4
