= 2011 Smart Card Open Monet+ – Singles =

Singles
- 2011 Smart Card Open Monet+

Final
- Champion: (Austria) Patricia Mayr-Achleitner
- Runner-up: (Russia) Ksenia Pervak
- Score: 6–1, 6–0

Events
Singles	Doubles
← 2010 ·	Smart Card Open Monet+	· 2012 →

Patricia Mayr-Achleitner was the champion from 2010, and successfully defended her title by defeating Ksenia Pervak in the final, 6–1, 6–0.

== Seeds ==
1. (Russia) Ksenia Pervak (final)
2. (Austria) Patricia Mayr-Achleitner (champion)
3. (Russia) Ekaterina Ivanova (first round)
4. (Ukraine) Yuliya Beygelzimer (semifinals)
5. (Poland) Magda Linette (first round)
6. (Bulgaria) Elitsa Kostova (second round)
7. (Romania) Alexandra Cadanțu (quarterfinals)
8. (Canada) Heidi El Tabakh (quarterfinals)

== Main draw ==
=== Key ===
- Q = Qualifier
- WC = Wild card
- LL = Lucky loser
- Alt = Alternate
- SE = Special exempt
- PR = Protected ranking
- ITF = ITF entry
- JE = Junior exempt
- w/o = Walkover
- r = Retired
- d = Defaulted
- SR = Special ranking

=== Finals ===
Semifinals
1	(Russia) Ksenia Pervak	6	7
4	(Ukraine) Yuliya Beygelzimer	2	5
(Germany) Anna-Lena Grönefeld	4	3
2	(Austria) Patricia Mayr-Achleitner	6	6

Final
1	(Russia) Ksenia Pervak	1	0
2	(Austria) Patricia Mayr-Achleitner	6	6

=== Top half ===
First round
1	(Russia) K Pervak	6	6
WC	(Czech Republic) D Allertová	3	1
(Slovenia) A Klepač	4	2
PR	(Hungary) K Marosi	6	6
(Ukraine) L Kichenok	2	3
(Slovakia) L Wienerová	6	6
(Germany) L Siegemund	6	7^{10}
5	(Poland) M Linette	4	6^{8}
4	(Ukraine) Y Beygelzimer	6	6
WC	(Czech Republic) M Kubičíková	2	3
(Slovenia) M Zec Peškirič	6	6
Q	(Russia) Y Kalabina	1	1
Q	(Lithuania) L Stančiūtė	6	6
(Hungary) R-L Jani	3	2
(Croatia) A Vrljić	4	4
7	(Romania) A Cadanțu	6	6

Second round
1	(Russia) K Pervak	7^{7}	6
PR	(Hungary) K Marosi	6^{5}	2
(Slovakia) L Wienerová	1	6	6
(Germany) L Siegemund	6	3	2
4	(Ukraine) Y Beygelzimer	6	6
(Slovenia) M Zec Peškirič	4	2
Q	(Lithuania) L Stančiūtė	6^{6}	4
7	(Romania) A Cadanțu	7^{8}	6

Quarterfinals
1	(Russia) K Pervak	6	7^{7}
(Slovakia) L Wienerová	1	6^{3}
4	(Ukraine) Y Beygelzimer	6	0	7^{7}
7	(Romania) A Cadanțu	3	6	6^{3}

Semifinals
1	(Russia) K Pervak	6	7
4	(Ukraine) Y Beygelzimer	2	5

=== Bottom half ===
First round
6	(Bulgaria) E Kostova	6	6
WC	(Czech Republic) K Kramperová	4	4
Q	(Slovakia) Z Luknárová	6	5
(Slovakia) L Juríková	4	3^{r}
LL	(Russia) E Pashkova	6^{4}	0
(Slovakia) M Pochabová	7^{7}	6
(Germany) A-L Grönefeld	6	6
3	(Russia) E Ivanova	2	1
8	(Canada) H El Tabakh	7^{7}	6
(Australia) I Holland	6^{4}	4
WC	(Czech Republic) K Klapková	6^{1}	0^{r}
Q	(Slovakia) Z Zlochová	7^{7}	0
(Georgia (country)) M Chakhnashvili	2	3
(Ukraine) I Buryachok	6	6
LL	(Latvia) D Marcinkēviča	2	6	3
2	(Austria) P Mayr-Achleitner	6	1	6

Second round
6	(Bulgaria) E Kostova	6	2	1
Q	(Slovakia) Z Luknárová	3	6	6
(Slovakia) M Pochabová	4	0
(Germany) A-L Grönefeld	6	6
8	(Canada) H El Tabakh	6	6
Q	(Slovakia) Z Zlochová	2	0
(Ukraine) I Buryachok	3	3
2	(Austria) P Mayr-Achleitner	6	6

Quarterfinals
Q	(Slovakia) Z Luknárová	2	3
(Germany) A-L Grönefeld	6	6
8	(Canada) H El Tabakh	0^{r}
2	(Austria) P Mayr-Achleitner	5

Semifinals
(Germany) A-L Grönefeld	4	3
2	(Austria) P Mayr-Achleitner	6	6
