= 2015 Gastein Ladies – Doubles =

Doubles
- 2015 Gastein Ladies

Final
- Champions: (Montenegro) Danka Kovinić (Liechtenstein) Stephanie Vogt
- Runners-up: (Spain) Lara Arruabarrena (Czech Republic) Lucie Hradecká
- Score: 4–6, 6–3, [10–3]

Details
- Draw: 16
- Seeds: 4

Events
| Singles | Doubles |
| ← 2014 · | Gastein Ladies |

Karolína Plíšková and Kristýna Plíšková were the defending champions, but chose not to participate this year.
Danka Kovinić and Stephanie Vogt won the title, defeating Lara Arruabarrena and Lucie Hradecká in the final, 4–6, 6–3, [10–3].

== Seeds ==
1. (Spain) Lara Arruabarrena / (Czech Republic) Lucie Hradecká (final)
2. (Poland) Alicja Rosolska / (Germany) Laura Siegemund (quarterfinals)
3. (Slovenia) Andreja Klepač / (Serbia) Aleksandra Krunić (quarterfinals)
4. (Slovakia) Janette Husárová / (Czech Republic) Kateřina Siniaková (withdrew)

== Draw ==
=== Key ===
- Q = Qualifier
- WC = Wild card
- LL = Lucky loser
- Alt = Alternate
- SE = Special exempt
- PR = Protected ranking
- ITF = ITF entry
- JE = Junior exempt
- w/o = Walkover
- r = Retired
- d = Defaulted
- SR = Special ranking

First round
1 | (Spain) L Arruabarrena (Czech Republic) L Hradecká | 7^{10} | 6
(United Kingdom) J Rae (United Kingdom) A Smith | 6^{8} | 2
(Germany) J Görges (Croatia) P Martić | 7^{7} | 4 | [10]
(Argentina) F Molinero (Russia) V Solovyeva | 6^{2} | 6 | [4]
3 | (Slovenia) A Klepač (Serbia) A Krunić | 6 | 3 | [10]
(Czech Republic) B Krejčíková (Netherlands) D Schuurs | 2 | 6 | [3]
(Ukraine) A Fomina (Bulgaria) E Kostova | 4 | 6 | [12]
(Switzerland) X Knoll (Italy) A Matteucci | 6 | 2 | [14]
(Slovenia) N Kolar (Greece) D Papamichail | 4 | 7 | [6]
(Poland) K Piter (Ukraine) M Zanevska | 6 | 5 | [10]
WC | (Germany) A Beck (Austria) T Paszek | w/o
4 | (Slovakia) J Husárová (Czech Republic) K Siniaková
(Montenegro) D Kovinić (Liechtenstein) S Vogt | 6 | 7
WC | (Austria) B Haas (Austria) P Mayr-Achleitner | 4 | 5
(Austria) S Klemenschits (Germany) C Witthöft | 7 | 1 | [9]
2 | (Poland) A Rosolska (Germany) L Siegemund | 5 | 6 | [11]

Quarterfinals
1 | (Spain) L Arruabarrena (Czech Republic) L Hradecká | 6 | 6
(Germany) J Görges (Croatia) P Martić | 4 | 3
3 | (Slovenia) A Klepač (Serbia) A Krunić | 6^{1} | 4
(Switzerland) X Knoll (Italy) A Matteucci | 7^{7} | 6
(Poland) K Piter (Ukraine) M Zanevska | 6 | 6
WC | (Germany) A Beck (Austria) T Paszek | 3 | 4
(Montenegro) D Kovinić (Liechtenstein) S Vogt | 0 | 6 | [10]
2 | (Poland) A Rosolska (Germany) L Siegemund | 6 | 4 | [5]

Semifinals
1 | (Spain) L Arruabarrena (Czech Republic) L Hradecká | 6 | 6
(Switzerland) X Knoll (Italy) A Matteucci | 4 | 2
(Poland) K Piter (Ukraine) M Zanevska | 3 | 4
(Montenegro) D Kovinić (Liechtenstein) S Vogt | 6 | 6

Final
1 | (Spain) L Arruabarrena (Czech Republic) L Hradecká | 6 | 4 | [3]
(Montenegro) D Kovinić (Liechtenstein) S Vogt | 4 | 6 | [10]
