= 2015 Gastein Ladies – Singles =

Singles
- 2015 Gastein Ladies

Final
- Champion: (Australia) Samantha Stosur
- Runner-up: (Italy) Karin Knapp
- Score: 3–6, 7–6^{(7–3)}, 6–2

Details
- Draw: 32
- Seeds: 8

Events
Singles	Doubles
- Gastein Ladies

Andrea Petkovic was the defending champion, but she chose not to participate this year.
Samantha Stosur won the title, defeating Karin Knapp in the final, 3–6, 7–6^{(7–3)}, 6–2.

== Seeds ==
1. (Italy) Sara Errani (semifinals)
2. (Australia) Samantha Stosur (champion)
3. (Italy) Karin Knapp (final)
4. (Germany) Carina Witthöft (first round)
5. (Czech Republic) Lucie Hradecká (second round)
6. (Germany) Julia Görges (second round)
7. (Slovakia) Anna Karolína Schmiedlová (semifinals)
8. (Czech Republic) Kateřina Siniaková (first round)

== Draw ==
Key

- Q = Qualifier
- WC = Wild card
- LL = Lucky loser
- Alt = Alternate
- ITF = ITF entry
- PR = Protected ranking
- SR = Special ranking
- SE = Special exempt
- JE = Junior exempt
- JR = Junior Accelerator Programme entrant
- CO = College Accelerator Programme entrant
- NG = Next Gen Accelerator Program entrant
- w/o = Walkover
- r = Retired
- d = Defaulted

=== Finals ===
Semifinals
1	(Italy) Sara Errani	6^{4}	6	5
3	(Italy) Karin Knapp	7^{7}	4	7
7	(Slovakia) Anna Karolína Schmiedlová	1	5
2	(Australia) Samantha Stosur	6	7

Final
3	(Italy) Karin Knapp	6	6^{3}	2
2	(Australia) Samantha Stosur	3	7^{7}	6

=== Top half ===
First round
1	(Italy) S Errani	6	6
Q	(Belarus) A Sasnovich	4	4
Q	(Romania) A Bogdan	4	2
Q	(Ukraine) M Zanevska	6	6
Q	(Russia) D Kasatkina	6	6
(Serbia) A Krunić	3	1
LL	(Japan) R Ozaki	3	4
6	(Germany) J Görges	6	6
3	(Italy) K Knapp	6	6^{5}	7^{8}
WC	(Austria) T Paszek	0	7^{7}	6^{6}
(Sweden) J Larsson	6	6
(Switzerland) S Vögele	2	2
(Hungary) T Babos	4	2
(Slovenia) P Hercog	6	6
(Spain) L Arruabarrena	4	1
5	(Czech Republic) L Hradecká	6	6

Second round
1	(Italy) S Errani	6	4	7
Q	(Ukraine) M Zanevska	2	6	5
Q	(Russia) D Kasatkina	3	6	6
6	(Germany) J Görges	6	4	3
3	(Italy) K Knapp	6	6
(Sweden) J Larsson	3	3
(Slovenia) P Hercog	6	6
5	(Czech Republic) L Hradecká	3	2

Quarterfinals
1	(Italy) S Errani	6	3	6
Q	(Russia) D Kasatkina	3	6	2
3	(Italy) K Knapp	7^{7}	7
(Slovenia) P Hercog	6^{5}	5

Semifinals
1	(Italy) S Errani	6^{4}	6	5
3	(Italy) K Knapp	7^{7}	4	7

=== Bottom half ===
First round
7	(Slovakia) AK Schmiedlová	3	6	6
WC	(Austria) P Mayr-Achleitner	6	2	0
WC	(Austria) B Haas	1	7^{7}	6^{5}
(Romania) A Mitu	6	6^{5}	7^{7}
(Brazil) T Pereira	2^{r}
(Germany) A Beck	5
(Czech Republic) D Allertová	3	7^{7}	6
4	(Germany) C Witthöft	6	6^{5}	4
8	(Czech Republic) K Siniaková	4	4
(Montenegro) D Kovinić	6	6
LL	(Netherlands) R Hogenkamp	6	6
Q	(Croatia) P Martić	4	3
(Germany) A-L Friedsam	6	4^{r}
(Czech Republic) K Koukalová	1	0
Q	(Latvia) A Sevastova	4	6	1
2	(Australia) S Stosur	6	4	6

Second round
7	(Slovakia) AK Schmiedlová	6	0
(Romania) A Mitu	1	0^{r}
(Germany) A Beck	6	6
(Czech Republic) D Allertová	2	3
(Montenegro) D Kovinić	6	6
LL	(Netherlands) R Hogenkamp	3	1
(Czech Republic) K Koukalová	1	0
2	(Australia) S Stosur	6	6

Quarterfinals
7	(Slovakia) AK Schmiedlová	6	6
(Germany) A Beck	2	3
(Montenegro) D Kovinić	3	2
2	(Australia) S Stosur	6	6

Semifinals
7	(Slovakia) AK Schmiedlová	1	5
2	(Australia) S Stosur	6	7

== Qualifying ==
=== Seeds ===
1. (Netherlands) Richèl Hogenkamp (qualifying competition, lucky loser)
2. (Belarus) Aliaksandra Sasnovich (qualified)
3. (Slovakia) Kristína Kučová (first round, retired)
4. (Japan) Risa Ozaki (qualifying competition, lucky loser)
5. (Ukraine) Maryna Zanevska (qualified)
6. (Croatia) Petra Martić (qualified)
7. (Liechtenstein) Stephanie Vogt (first round)
8. (Russia) Daria Kasatkina (qualified)
9. (United States) Alexa Glatch (first round)
10. (United States) Katerina Stewart (qualifying competition)
11. (Russia) Marina Melnikova (qualifying competition)
12. (Latvia) Anastasija Sevastova (qualified)

=== Qualifiers ===
1. (Russia) Daria Kasatkina
2. (Belarus) Aliaksandra Sasnovich
3. (Romania) Ana Bogdan
4. (Latvia) Anastasija Sevastova
5. (Ukraine) Maryna Zanevska
6. (Croatia) Petra Martić

=== Lucky losers ===
1. (Netherlands) Richèl Hogenkamp
2. (Japan) Risa Ozaki

=== Draw ===
==== First qualifier ====
First round
1	(Netherlands) Richèl Hogenkamp	6^{6}	6	6
WC	(Austria) Julia Grabher	7^{8}	4	2
PR	(Russia) Victoria Kan	1	2
8	(Russia) Daria Kasatkina	6	6

Qualifying competition
1	(Netherlands) Richèl Hogenkamp	1	1
8	(Russia) Daria Kasatkina	6	6

==== Second qualifier ====
First round
2	(Belarus) Aliaksandra Sasnovich	6	6
WC	(Germany) Luisa-Marie Huber	1	1
WC	(Austria) Mira Antonitsch	6	1	1
11	(Russia) Marina Melnikova	3	6	6

Qualifying competition
2	(Belarus) Aliaksandra Sasnovich	6	7^{7}
11	(Russia) Marina Melnikova	1	6^{4}

==== Third qualifier ====
First round
3	(Slovakia) Kristína Kučová	1	1^{r}
(Romania) Ana Bogdan	6	4
(Bulgaria) Elitsa Kostova	4	3
10	(United States) Katerina Stewart	6	6

Qualifying competition
(Romania) Ana Bogdan	6	7^{7}
10	(United States) Katerina Stewart	1	6^{5}

==== Fourth qualifier ====
First round
4	(Japan) Risa Ozaki	6	6
(Argentina) Florencia Molinero	2	2
Alt	(Switzerland) Xenia Knoll	2	2
12/Alt	(Latvia) Anastasija Sevastova	6	6

Qualifying competition
4	(Japan) Risa Ozaki	4	2
12/Alt	(Latvia) Anastasija Sevastova	6	6

==== Fifth qualifier ====
First round
5	(Ukraine) Maryna Zanevska	6	6
(Slovenia) Nastja Kolar	4	4
(Poland) Katarzyna Piter	6	3	6
9	(United States) Alexa Glatch	4	6	2

Qualifying competition
5	(Ukraine) Maryna Zanevska	6	6
(Poland) Katarzyna Piter	2	4

==== Sixth qualifier ====
First round
6	(Croatia) Petra Martić	6	7^{7}
WC	(Austria) Pia König	0	6^{1}
(Czech Republic) Tereza Martincová	6	6
7	(Liechtenstein) Stephanie Vogt	3	0

Qualifying competition
6	(Croatia) Petra Martić	6	7
(Czech Republic) Tereza Martincová	4	5
