= 2015 Gastein Ladies =

- Date: 20–26 July
- Edition: 9th
- Category: WTA International
- Draw: 32S / 16D
- Prize money: $250,000
- Surface: Clay - outdoor
- Location: Bad Gastein, Austria

Champions

Singles
- (Australia) Samantha Stosur

Doubles
- (Montenegro) Danka Kovinić / (Liechtenstein) Stephanie Vogt
- Gastein Ladies

The 2015 Nürnberger Gastein Ladies was the 2015 edition of the Gastein Ladies clay court tennis tournament. It was the ninth and final edition of the tournament, and part of the 2015 WTA Tour. It took place in Bad Gastein, Austria between 20 July and 26 July 2015. Second-seeded Samantha Stosur won the singles title.

== Finals ==
=== Singles ===
- (Australia) Samantha Stosur defeated (Italy) Karin Knapp, 3–6, 7–6^{(7–3)}, 6–2
- It was Stosur's 2nd and last singles title of the year and the 8th of her career.

=== Doubles ===
- (Montenegro) Danka Kovinić / (Liechtenstein) Stephanie Vogt defeated (Spain) Lara Arruabarrena / (Czech Republic) Lucie Hradecká, 4–6, 6–3, [10–3]

== Points and prize money ==
=== Point distribution ===
Event	W	F	SF	QF	Round of 16	Round of 32	Q	Q2	Q1
Singles	280	180	110	60	30	1	18	12	1
Doubles	280	180	110	60	1	—N/a	—N/a	—N/a	—N/a

=== Prize money ===
Event	W	F	SF	QF	Round of 16	Round of 32	Q2	Q1
Singles	$43,000	$21,400	$11,300	$5,900	$3,310	$1,925	$1,005	$730
Doubles	$12,300	$6,400	$3,435	$1,820	$960	—N/a	—N/a	—N/a

== Singles main-draw entrants ==
=== Seeds ===
Country	Player	Rank^{1}	Seed
ITA	Sara Errani	20	1
AUS	Samantha Stosur	22	2
ITA	Karin Knapp	43	3
GER	Carina Witthöft	50	4
CZE	Lucie Hradecká	55	5
GER	Julia Görges	57	5
SVK	Anna Karolína Schmiedlová	60	7
CZE	Kateřina Siniaková	65	8

- ^{1} Rankings are as of July 13, 2015.

=== Other entrants ===
The following players received wildcards into the singles main draw:

- (Austria) Barbara Haas
- (Austria) Patricia Mayr-Achleitner
- (Austria) Tamira Paszek

The following players received entry from the qualifying draw:

- (Romania) Ana Bogdan
- (Russia) Daria Kasatkina
- (Croatia) Petra Martić
- (Belarus) Aliaksandra Sasnovich
- (Latvia) Anastasija Sevastova
- (Ukraine) Maryna Zanevska

The following players received entry as lucky losers:

- (Netherlands) Richèl Hogenkamp
- (Japan) Risa Ozaki

=== Withdrawals ===
Before the tournament

- (Slovakia) Jana Čepelová → replaced by (Japan) Risa Ozaki
- (Estonia) Kaia Kanepi → replaced by (Hungary) Tímea Babos
- (Germany) Tatjana Maria → replaced by (Germany) Anna-Lena Friedsam
- (United States) Christina McHale → replaced by (Montenegro) Danka Kovinić
- (Kazakhstan) Yulia Putintseva → replaced by (Netherlands) Richèl Hogenkamp
- (Czech Republic) Tereza Smitková → replaced by (Switzerland) Stefanie Vögele

=== Retirements ===
- (Germany) Anna-Lena Friedsam
- (Romania) Andreea Mitu
- (Brazil) Teliana Pereira

== Doubles main-draw entrants ==
=== Seeds ===
Country	Player	Country	Player	Rank^{1}	Seed
ESP	Lara Arruabarrena	CZE	Lucie Hradecká	66	1
POL	Alicja Rosolska	GER	Laura Siegemund	122	2
SLO	Andreja Klepač	SRB	Aleksandra Krunić	133	3
~~SVK~~	~~Janette Husárová~~	~~CZE~~	~~Kateřina Siniaková~~	~~133~~	~~4~~

- ^{1} Rankings as of July 13, 2015.

=== Other entrants ===
The following pairs received wildcards into the main draw:

- (Germany) Annika Beck / (Austria) Tamira Paszek
- (Austria) Barbara Haas / (Austria) Patricia Mayr-Achleitner

=== Withdrawals ===
Before the tournament

- (Czech Republic) Kateřina Siniaková
