= Simona Dobrá =

Czech tennis player

- Country (sports): Czech Republic
- Born: 24 June 1987 (age 37); Olomouc, Czechoslovakia
- Retired: 2012
- Prize money: $41,535

Singles
- Career record: 117–110
- Career titles: 2 ITF
- Highest ranking: No. 514 (15 September 2008)

Doubles
- Career record: 138–75
- Career titles: 21 ITF
- Highest ranking: No. 241 (8 June 2009)

Simona Dobrá (born 24 June 1987) is a retired Czech tennis player.

Dobrá won two singles and 21 doubles titles on the ITF Women's Circuit in her career. On 15 September 2008, she reached her best singles ranking of world No. 514. On 8 June 2009, she peaked at No. 241 in the doubles rankings.

In June 2008, partnering Tereza Hladíková, Dobrá won the $75k tournament in Zlín, defeating Lucie Hradecká and Renata Voráčová in the final.

Dobrá retired from tennis 2012.

== ITF finals ==
=== Singles (2–2) ===
Legend $25,000 tournaments $10,000 tournaments	Finals by surface Hard (0–0) Clay (2–2)

Outcome	No.	Date	Tournament	Surface	Opponent	Score
Runner-up	1.	21 July 2008	Horb, Germany	Clay	(Poland) Anna Korzeniak	6–2, 3–6, 1–6
Winner	1.	18 August 2008	Kędzierzyn-Koźle, Poland	Clay	(Slovakia) Nikola Vajdová	6–7^{(4)}, 6–0, 7–5
Winner	2.	6 June 2011	Nyíregyháza, Hungary	Clay	(Montenegro) Danka Kovinić	6–4, 6–2
Runner-up	2.	4 July 2011	Sarajevo, Bosnia and Herzegovina	Clay	(Czech Republic) Martina Kubičíková	6–3, 5–7, 0–6

=== Doubles (21–10) ===
Legend $100,000 tournaments $75,000 tournaments $50,000 tournaments $25,000 tournaments $15,000 tournaments $10,000 tournaments	Finals by surface Hard (0–1) Clay (21–7) Grass (0–0) Carpet (0–2)

Outcome	No.	Date	Tournament	Surface	Partner	Opponents	Score
Winner	1.	5 April 2004	Cairo, Egypt	Clay	(Czech Republic) Hana Šromová	(Sweden) Helena Ejeson (Germany) Annette Kolb	w/o
Runner-up	1.	17 October 2005	Settimo San Pietro, Italy	Clay	(Czech Republic) Renata Kučerková	(Italy) Alice Balducci (Italy) Nancy Rustignoli	2–6, 4–6
Runner-up	2.	24 October 2005	Quartu Sant'Elena, Italy	Hard	(Czech Republic) Renata Kučerková	(Netherlands) Kika Hogendoorn (United Kingdom) Samantha Murray	4–6, 6–4, 5–7
Winner	2.	14 August 2006	Kędzierzyn-Koźle, Poland	Clay	(Czech Republic) Lucie Kriegsmannová	(Ukraine) Irina Khatsko (Ukraine) Mariya Malkhasyan	6–4, 7–6^{(4)}
Winner	3.	5 February 2007	Mallorca, Spain	Clay	(Romania) Antonia Xenia Tout	(Russia) Angelina Gabueva (Germany) Tatjana Priachin	6–1, 6–2
Winner	4.	23 July 2007	Horb, Germany	Clay	(Czech Republic) Lucie Kriegsmannová	(Serbia) Miljana Adanko (Germany) Laura Haberkorn	6–3, 6–3
Winner	5.	30 July 2007	Bad Saulgau, Germany	Clay	(Czech Republic) Tereza Hladíková	(Czech Republic) Iveta Gerlová (Czech Republic) Lucie Kriegsmannová	2–6, 6–4, 6–2
Winner	6.	27 August 2007	Prague, Czech Republic	Clay	(Czech Republic) Lucie Kriegsmannová	(Czech Republic) Barbora Matúšová (Poland) Anna Mydłowska	6–2, 6–1
Winner	7.	9 June 2008	Zlín, Czech Republic	Clay	(Czech Republic) Tereza Hladíková	(Czech Republic) Lucie Hradecká (Czech Republic) Renata Voráčová	6–4, 6–3
Winner	8.	21 July 2008	Horb, Germany	Clay	(Czech Republic) Lucie Kriegsmannová	(Netherlands) Daniëlle Harmsen (Netherlands) Kim Kilsdonk	2–6, 6–3, [10–8]
Winner	9.	28 July 2008	Bad Saulgau, Germany	Clay	(Czech Republic) Tereza Hladíková	(Italy) Anna Floris (Luxembourg) Claudine Schaul	6–1, 4–6, [10–8]
Winner	10.	18 August 2008	Kędzierzyn-Koźle, Poland	Clay	(Czech Republic) Iveta Gerlová	(South Africa) Lisa Marshall (Ukraine) Ielyzaveta Rybakova	4–6, 6–0, [10–6]
Runner-up	3.	9 February 2009	Mallorca, Spain	Clay	(Poland) Magdalena Kiszczyńska	(Serbia) Neda Kozić (France) Laura Thorpe	3–6, 6–2, [3–10]
Winner	11.	16 March 2009	Rome, Italy	Clay	(Poland) Karolina Kosińska	(Italy) Claudia Giovine (Italy) Valentina Sulpizio	6–3, 6–4
Runner-up	4.	11 May 2009	Michalovce, Slovakia	Clay	(Czech Republic) Lucie Kriegsmannová	(Czech Republic) Martina Borecká (Czech Republic) Martina Kubičíková	6–2, 2–6, [9–11]
Winner	12.	6 July 2009	Brussels, Belgium	Clay	(Czech Republic) Kateřina Vaňková	(Russia) Vasilisa Davydova (Russia) Elina Gasanova	6–3, 6–4
Winner	13.	24 August 2009	Prague, Czech Republic	Clay	(Czech Republic) Lucie Kriegsmannová	(Czech Republic) Martina Borecká (Czech Republic) Iveta Gerlová	7–6^{(2)}, 6–2
Runner-up	5.	8 March 2010	Buchen, Germany	Carpet (i)	(Czech Republic) Tereza Hladíková	(Ukraine) Irina Buryachok (Switzerland) Amra Sadiković	5–7, 3–6
Runner-up	6.	15 March 2010	Wetzikon, Switzerland	Carpet (i)	(Czech Republic) Tereza Hladíková	(Switzerland) Xenia Knoll (Switzerland) Amra Sadiković	4–6, 6–7^{(5)}
Winner	14.	19 July 2010	Horb, Germany	Clay	(Czech Republic) Lucie Kriegsmannová	(Germany) Korina Perkovic (Germany) Anna Zaja	4–6, 7–6^{(5)}, [10–8]
Runner-up	7.	4 April 2011	Šibenik, Croatia	Clay	(Czech Republic) Tereza Hladíková	(Switzerland) Mateja Kraljevic (Switzerland) Amra Sadiković	5–7, 3–6
Winner	15.	18 April 2011	Torrent, Spain	Clay	(Czech Republic) Tereza Hladíková	(Spain) Yvonne Cavallé Reimers (Spain) Isabel Rapisarda Calvo	6–4, 2–6, [10–4]
Winner	16.	25 April 2011	Vic, Spain	Clay	(Czech Republic) Tereza Hladíková	(Venezuela) Andrea Gámiz (Greece) Despina Papamichail	6–2, 6–1
Winner	17.	6 June 2011	Nyíregyháza, Hungary	Clay	(Czech Republic) Monika Tůmová	(Hungary) Vaszilisza Bulgakova (Romania) Raluca Elena Platon	6–1, 3–6, [10–7]
Winner	18.	4 July 2011	Sarajevo, Bosnia and Herzegovina	Clay	(Czech Republic) Martina Kubičíková	(Hungary) Csilla Argyelán (Norway) Ulrikke Eikeri	6–2, 6–1
Winner	19.	1 August 2011	Vienna, Austria	Clay	(Czech Republic) Lucie Kriegsmannová	(Bosnia and Herzegovina) Sandra Martinović (Austria) Janina Toljan	6–4, 6–1
Winner	20.	15 August 2011	Piešťany, Slovakia	Clay	(Czech Republic) Lucie Kriegsmannová	(Poland) Paula Kania (Czech Republic) Martina Kubičíková	6–4, 6–2
Runner-up	8.	23 January 2012	Mallorca, Spain	Clay	(Czech Republic) Lucie Kriegsmannová	(Italy) Anastasia Grymalska (Poland) Barbara Sobaszkiewicz	6–7^{(6)}, 6–2, [7–10]
Winner	21.	7 May 2012	Bad Saarow, Germany	Clay	(Czech Republic) Martina Borecká	(Germany) Carolin Daniels (Germany) Dejana Raickovic	6–2, 6–2
Runner-up	9.	28 May 2012	Přerov, Czech Republic	Clay	(Czech Republic) Lucie Kriegsmannová	(Czech Republic) Nikola Fraňková (Czech Republic) Tereza Hladíková	6–4, 6–7^{(7)}, [8–10]
Runner-up	10.	6 August 2012	Piešťany, Slovakia	Clay	(Czech Republic) Lucie Kriegsmannová	(Slovakia) Karin Morgošová (Slovakia) Michaela Pochabová	3–6, 2–6
