= Tereza Hladíková =

Czech tennis player

- Country (sports): Czech Republic
- Residence: Valašské Meziříčí, Czech Republic
- Born: April 14, 1988 (age 36); Valašské Meziříčí, Czechoslovakia
- Height: 1.82 m (5 ft 11 1/2 in)
- Plays: Right (two-handed backhand)
- Prize money: $77,018

Singles
- Career record: 138–119
- Career titles: 2 ITF
- Highest ranking: No. 197 (27 April 2009)

Doubles
- Career record: 79–53
- Career titles: 10 ITF
- Highest ranking: No. 186 (4 May 2009)

Tereza Hladíková (born 14 April 1988) is a former professional tennis player from the Czech Republic.

She started playing tennis at the age of 8. Hladíková reached a career-high singles ranking on 27 April 2009, as the world No. 197, and a career-high doubles ranking on 4 May 2009, as No. 186. In her career, she won two singles and ten doubles titles on the ITF Women's Circuit.

Partnering Simona Dobrá, Hladíková won her first $75k tournament in June 2008 at the Smart Card Open Monet+, defeating Lucie Hradecká and Renata Voráčová in the final.

== ITF finals ==
Legend
$75,000 tournaments
$50,000 tournaments
$25,000 tournaments
$10,000 tournaments

=== Singles (2–2) ===
Outcome	No.	Date	Tournament	Surface	Opponent	Score
Runner-up	1.	19 March 2007	Raanana, Israel	Hard	(Israel) Evgenia Linetskaya	4–6, 4–6
Runner-up	2.	21 August 2007	Maribor, Slovenia	Clay	(Slovenia) Polona Hercog	6–4, 1–6, 1–4 ret.
Winner	3.	14 December 2008	Přerov, Czech Republic	Hard (i)	(Croatia) Ana Savić	6–4, 7–5
Winner	4.	6 November 2011	Montego Bay, Jamaica	Hard	(United States) Kelsey Laurente	6–3, 7–5

=== Doubles (10–6) ===
Outcome	No.	Date	Tournament	Surface	Partner	Opponents	Score
Runner-up	1.	7 June 2004	Staré Splavy, Czech Republic	Clay	(Czech Republic) Jana Děrkasová	(Czech Republic) Blanka Kumbárová (Czech Republic) Tereza Szafnerová	4–6, 4–6
Winner	2.	18 March 2007	Ramat HaSharon, Israel	Hard	(Czech Republic) Martina Ondrácková	(Belarus) Galina Semenova (Belarus) Tatsiana Teterina	7–6, 6–2
Winner	3.	30 July 2007	Bad Saulgau, Germany	Clay	(Czech Republic) Simona Dobrá	(Czech Republic) Iveta Gerlová (Czech Republic) Lucie Kriegsmannová	2–6, 6–4, 6–2
Winner	4.	14 May 2008	Szczecin, Poland	Clay	(Czech Republic) Iveta Gerlová	(Finland) Emma Laine (Serbia) Teodora Mirčić	6–1, 6–4
Winner	5.	9 June 2008	Zlín, Czech Republic	Clay	(Czech Republic) Simona Dobrá	(Czech Republic) Lucie Hradecká (Czech Republic) Renata Voráčová	6–4, 6–3
Winner	6.	28 July 2008	Bad Saulgau, Germany	Clay	(Czech Republic) Simona Dobrá	(Italy) Anna Floris (Luxembourg) Claudine Schaul	6–1, 4–6, [10–8]
Winner	7.	14 December 2008	Přerov, Czech Republic	Hard (i)	(Czech Republic) Renata Voráčová	(Russia) Ksenia Lykina (Czech Republic) Kateřina Vaňková	6–0, 3–6, [10–3]
Runner-up	8.	2 May 2009	Makarska, Croatia	Clay	(Poland) Karolina Kosińska	(Germany) Tatjana Malek (Czech Republic) Renata Voráčová	4–6, 7–5, [6–10]
Runner-up	9.	8 March 2010	Buchen, Germany	Carpet (i)	(Czech Republic) Simona Dobrá	(Ukraine) Irina Buryachok (Switzerland) Amra Sadiković	5–7, 3–6
Runner-up	10.	15 March 2010	Wetzikon, Switzerland	Carpet (i)	(Czech Republic) Simona Dobrá	(Switzerland) Xenia Knoll (Switzerland) Amra Sadiković	4–6, 6–7^{(5)}
Runner-up	11.	12 June 2010	Zlín, Czech Republic	Clay	(Slovakia) Michaela Pochabová	(Czech Republic) Eva Birnerová (France) Stéphanie Foretz	5–7, 6–4, [6–10]
Winner	12.	24 January 2011	Kaarst, Germany	Carpet (i)	(Czech Republic) Nikola Fraňková	(Poland) Paula Kania (Russia) Marina Melnikova	3–6, 7–6^{(1)}, [10–8]
Runner-up	13.	4 April 2011	Šibenik, Croatia	Clay	(Czech Republic) Simona Dobrá	(Switzerland) Mateja Kraljevic (Switzerland) Amra Sadiković	5–7, 3–6
Winner	14.	18 April 2011	Torrent, Spain	Clay	(Czech Republic) Simona Dobrá	(Spain) Yvonne Cavallé Reimers (Spain) Isabel Rapisarda Calvo	6–4, 2–6, [10–4]
Winner	15.	25 April 2011	Vic, Spain	Clay	(Czech Republic) Simona Dobrá	(Venezuela) Andrea Gámiz (Greece) Despina Papamichail	6–2, 6–1
Winner	16.	28 May 2012	Přerov Cup, Czech Republic	Clay	(Czech Republic) Nikola Fraňková	(Czech Republic) Simona Dobrá (Czech Republic) Lucie Kriegsmannová	4–6, 7–6^{(7)}, [10–8]
