= Nikola Fraňková =

Czech tennis player

- Country (sports): Czech Republic
- Born: 7 February 1988 (age 38) Brno, Czechoslovakia
- Prize money: $88,146

Singles
- Career record: 163–155
- Career titles: 1 ITF
- Highest ranking: No. 249 (9 March 2009)

Grand Slam singles results
- Australian Open Junior: 2R (2005)
- Wimbledon Junior: 3R (2005)
- US Open Junior: 2R (2005)

Doubles
- Career record: 182–126
- Career titles: 18 ITF
- Highest ranking: No. 157 (14 September 2009)

Nikola Fraňková (born 7 February 1988) is a Czech former tennis player.

In her career, Fraňková won one singles title and 18 doubles titles on the ITF Women's Circuit. On 9 March 2009, she reached her highest WTA singles ranking of 249. Her best doubles ranking was 157 on 14 September 2009.

Fraňková won four $25,000 doubles events in 2006, and in 2009 participated in three WTA Tour qualifying draws, at Warsaw, Portorož and Tashkent, losing in the first round in each.

== Juniors ==
She and Ágnes Szávay ended runners-up to Victoria Azarenka and Marina Erakovic in the 2005 Australian Open girls' doubles final. But Fraňková won the girls' doubles at the 2005 US Open, with Russian Alisa Kleybanova.

== ITF Circuit finals ==
=== Singles: 5 (1–4) ===
Legend $25,000 tournaments $10,000 tournaments	Finals by surface Hard (1–2) Carpet (0–2)

Result	No.	Date	Tournament	Surface	Opponent	Score
Loss	1.	28 February 2007	ITF Buchen, Germany	Carpet (i)	(Montenegro) Danica Krstajić	3–6, 6–3, 6–7^{(4)}
Loss	2.	3 March 2008	ITF Minsk, Belarus	Carpet (i)	(Russia) Anastasia Pavlyuchenkova	0–6, 1–6
Loss	3.	11 May 2008	ITF Irapuato, Mexico	Hard	(Colombia) Mariana Duque-Mariño	4–6, 6–3, 3–6
Win	1.	12 September 2011	ITF Antalya, Turkey	Hard	(United Kingdom) Francesca Stephenson	6–4, 6–3
Loss	4.	19 September 2011	ITF Adana, Turkey	Hard	(Chinese Taipei) Hsu Chieh-yu	0–6, 5–7

=== Doubles: 30 (18–12) ===
Legend $50,000 tournaments $25,000 tournaments $15,000 tournaments $10,000 tournaments	Finals by surface Hard (9–7) Clay (5–4) Grass (0–1) Carpet (4–0)

Outcome	No.	Date	Tournament	Surface	Partner	Opponents	Score
Winner	1.	28 May 2006	ITF Campobasso, Italy	Clay	(Russia) Alisa Kleybanova	(Russia) Elena Chalova (Czech Republic) Renata Voráčová	w/o
Winner	2.	12 June 2006	ITF Lenzerheide, Switzerland	Clay	(Czech Republic) Lucie Kriegsmannová	(Germany) Carmen Klaschka (Germany) Justine Ozga	6–2, 6–4
Winner	3.	7 November 2006	ITF Opole, Poland	Carpet (i)	(Czech Republic) Andrea Hlaváčková	(Poland) Olga Brózda (Poland) Natalia Kołat	7–5, 6–0
Winner	4.	15 November 2006	ITF Přerov, Czech Republic	Hard (i)	(Czech Republic) Andrea Hlaváčková	(Czech Republic) Eva Hrdinová (Slovakia) Stanislava Hrozenská	6–2, 6–7^{(5)}, 6–3
Winner	5.	14 December 2006	ITF Valašské Meziříčí, Czech Republic	Hard (i)	(Czech Republic) Andrea Hlaváčková	(Poland) Olga Brózda (Poland) Natalia Kołat	6–1, 6–2
Winner	6.	26 February 2007	ITF Buchen, Germany	Carpet (i)	(Poland) Magdalena Kiszczyńska	(Austria) Eva-Maria Hoch (Switzerland) Lisa Sabino	w/o
Winner	7.	17 March 2008	Neva Cup St. Petersburg, Russia	Hard (i)	(Russia) Anastasia Pavlyuchenkova	(Russia) Nina Bratchikova (Russia) Vasilisa Davydova	6–2, 6–2
Winner	8.	24 March 2008	ITF Moscow, Russia	Hard (i)	(Russia) Anastasia Pavlyuchenkova	(Russia) Marina Shamayko (Georgia (country)) Sofia Shapatava	6–3, 6–2
Runner-up	1.	5 May 2008	ITF Irapuato, Mexico	Clay	(Switzerland) Stefania Boffa	(United Kingdom) Sarah Borwell (United States) Robin Stephenson	4–6, 6–3, [4–10]
Runner-up	2.	26 May 2008	ITF Tolyatti, Russia	Clay	(Austria) Patricia Mayr-Achleitner	(Russia) Nina Bratchikova (Russia) Vasilisa Davydova	3–6, 7–5, [3–10]
Runner-up	3.	16 June 2008	ITF İstanbul, Turkey	Hard	(Switzerland) Stefania Boffa	(Serbia) Teodora Mirčić (Slovakia) Lenka Tvarošková	5–7, 6–7^{(4)}
Runner-up	4.	12 July 2008	ITF Felixstowe, Great Britain	Grass	(United Kingdom) Anna Hawkins	(United Kingdom) Sarah Borwell (United States) Courtney Nagle	5–7, 3–6
Runner-up	5.	17 August 2008	ITF Penza, Russia	Clay	(Ukraine) Irina Buryachok	(Kyrgyzstan) Ksenia Palkina (Georgia (country)) Sofia Shapatava	4–6, 4–6
Runner-up	6.	13 October 2008	ITF Toronto, Canada	Hard (i)	(Germany) Carmen Klaschka	(Canada) Stéphanie Dubois (Canada) Marie-Ève Pelletier	4–6, 3–6
Runner-up	7.	8 June 2009	ITF Zlín, Czech Republic	Clay	(Germany) Carmen Klaschka	(Slovakia) Kristína Kučová (Slovakia) Zuzana Kučová	3–6, 4–6
Winner	9.	13 November 2010	ITF Antalya, Turkey	Hard (i)	(Russia) Marta Sirotkina	(Russia) Daria Salnikova (United Kingdom) Nicola Slater	3–6, 7–5, [10–5]
Winner	10.	24 January 2011	ITF Kaarst, Germany	Carpet (i)	(Czech Republic) Tereza Hladíková	(Poland) Paula Kania (Russia) Marina Melnikova	3–6, 7–6^{(1)}, [10–8]
Winner	11.	19 September 2011	ITF Adana, Turkey	Hard	(Chinese Taipei) Hsu Chieh-yu	(Turkey) Hülya Esen (Turkey) Lütfiye Esen	7–6^{(4)}, 6–4
Winner	12.	10 October 2011	Tatarstan Open, Kazakhstan	Hard (i)	(Russia) Polina Rodionova	(Russia) Diana Isaeva (United States) Elizaveta Nemchinov	6–2, 5–7, 6–2
Runner-up	8.	17 October 2011	ITF Almaty, Kazakhstan	Hard (i)	(Kazakhstan) Zalina Khairudinova	(Kazakhstan) Anna Danilina (Kazakhstan) Kamila Kerimbayeva	3–6, 1–6
Winner	13.	28 May 2012	ITF Přerov, Czech Republic	Clay	(Czech Republic) Tereza Hladíková	(Czech Republic) Simona Dobrá (Czech Republic) Lucie Kriegsmannová	4–6, 7–6^{(7)}, [10–8]
Runner-up	9.	15 October 2012	ITF Akko, Israel	Hard	(Russia) Ekaterina Yashina	(Poland) Natalia Kołat (Poland) Olga Brózda	2–6, 4–6
Runner-up	10.	22 October 2012	ITF Ashkelon, Israel	Hard	(Russia) Ekaterina Yashina	(Poland) Natalia Kołat (Poland) Olga Brózda	6–7^{(11)}, 1–6
Winner	14.	11 March 2013	ITF Orlando, United States	Clay	(Brazil) Nathalia Rossi	(Ukraine) Tetyana Arefyeva (Czech Republic) Kateřina Kramperová	7–5, 2–6, [10–8]
Runner-up	11.	8 April 2013	ITF Sharm El Sheikh, Egypt	Hard	(Germany) Michaela Frlicka	(Chinese Taipei) Juan Ting-fei (Russia) Yuliya Kalabina	3–6, 4–6
Winner	15.	22 July 2013	ITF Les Contamines-Montjoie, France	Hard	(Italy) Nicole Clerico	(France) Amandine Hesse (Argentina) Vanesa Furlanetto	3–6, 7–6^{(5)}, [10–8]
Runner-up	12.	14 October 2013	Open de Limoges, France	Hard (i)	(Italy) Nicole Clerico	(Poland) Magda Linette (Switzerland) Viktorija Golubic	4–6, 4–6
Winner	16.	11 November 2013	ITF Zawada, Poland	Carpet (i)	(Czech Republic) Tereza Smitková	(Poland) Justyna Jegiołka (Latvia) Diāna Marcinkēviča	6–1, 2–6, [10–8]
Winner	17.	3 March 2014	ITF Gainesville, United States	Clay	(Czech Republic) Kateřina Kramperová	(United States) Roxanne Ellison (United States) Sierra Ellison	6–4, 6–3
Winner	18.	1 December 2014	ITF Sharm El Sheikh, Egypt	Hard	(Italy) Claudia Giovine	(Russia) Anna Morgina (Russia) Anastasia Pribylova	7–6^{(1)}, 4–6, [10–6]

== Junior career finals ==
=== Grand Slam tournaments ===
==== Girls' doubles (1–1) ====
Result	Year	Championship	Surface	Partner	Opponents	Score
Loss	2005	Australian Open	Hard	(Hungary) Ágnes Szávay	(Belarus) Victoria Azarenka (New Zealand) Marina Erakovic	0–6, 2–6
Win	2005	US Open	Hard	(Russia) Alisa Kleybanova	(United States) Alexa Glatch (United States) Vania King	7–5, 7–6^{(7–3)}
