= Michaela Pochabová =

Slovak tennis player

- Country (sports): Slovakia
- Born: October 17, 1989 (age 35)
- Plays: Right-handed
- Prize money: $64,449

Singles
- Career record: 168–115
- Career titles: 3 ITF
- Highest ranking: No. 236 (June 7, 2010)

Doubles
- Career record: 60–53
- Career titles: 5 ITF
- Highest ranking: No. 265 (June 14, 2010)

Michaela Pochabová (Slovak pronunciation: [ˈmixaela ˈpɔxabɔʋaː]; born 17 October 1989) is a former professional Slovak tennis player.

On 7 June 2010, she reached her highest singles ranking of No. 236 by the WTA whilst her best doubles ranking is 265, achieved on 14 June 2010.

== ITF finals ==
$100,000 tournaments
$75,000 tournaments
$50,000 tournaments
$25,000 tournaments
$10,000 tournaments

=== Singles (3–4) ===
Outcome	No.	Date	Tournament	Surface	Opponent	Score
Winner	1.	7 October 2007	Castel Gandolfo, Italy	Clay	(Germany) Anne Schäfer	6–1, 4–6, 6–4
Runner-up	1.	22 June 2008	Davos, Switzerland	Clay	(Switzerland) Amra Sadiković	6–7^{(5–7)}, 6–7^{(3–7)}
Runner-up	2.	13 July 2008	Garching, Germany	Clay	(Sweden) Hanna Nooni	2–6, 5–7
Runner-up	3.	17 May 2009	Michalovce, Slovakia	Clay	(Slovakia) Lenka Juríková	4–6, 6–2, 5–7
Runner-up	4.	20 September 2009	Naples, Italy	Clay	(Georgia (country)) Margalita Chakhnashvili	2–6, 1–6
Winner	2.	14 March 2010	Antalya, Turkey	Clay	(Italy) Evelyn Mayr	6–1, 7–5
Winner	3.	29 August 2010	Prague, Czech Republic	Clay	(Czech Republic) Lucie Kriegsmannová	7–5, 7–5

=== Doubles (5–5) ===
Outcome	No.	Date	Tournament	Surface	Partner	Opponents	Score
Winner	1.	8 September 2007	Kędzierzyn-Koźle, Poland	Clay	(Slovakia) Patrícia Verešová	(Poland) Olga Brózda (Poland) Sylwia Zagórska	6–2, 6–4
Runner-up	1.	2 March 2008	Antalya, Turkey	Carpet (i)	(Slovakia) Patrícia Verešová	(United Kingdom) Laura Haberkorn (Germany) Antonia Matic	2–6, 4–6
Winner	2.	27 September 2008	Lecce, Italy	Clay	(Slovakia) Klaudia Boczová	(Italy) Stefania Chieppa (Italy) Giulia Gabba	6–4, 6–1
Runner-up	2.	26 April 2009	Bol, Croatia	Clay	(Slovakia) Patrícia Verešová	(Czech Republic) Martina Borecká (Thailand) Noppawan Lertcheewakarn	3–6, 3–6
Winner	3.	6 March 2010	Antalya, Turkey	Clay	(Slovakia) Romana Tabak	(Romania) Diana Marcu (Romania) Simona Matei	6–1, 6–1
Runner-up	3.	12 June 2010	Zlín, Czech Republic	Clay	(Czech Republic) Tereza Hladíková	(Czech Republic) Eva Birnerová (France) Stéphanie Foretz Gacon	5–7, 6–4, [6–10]
Runner-up	4.	17 January 2011	Stuttgart, Germany	Hard (i)	(Slovakia) Jana Čepelová	(Netherlands) Daniëlle Harmsen (Russia) Marina Melnikova	6–3, 4–6, [12–14]
Winner	4.	12 August 2012	Piestany, Slovakia	Clay	(Slovakia) Karin Morgosova	(Czech Republic) Simona Dobrá (Czech Republic) Lucie Kriegsmannová	6–3, 6–2
Runner-up	5.	2 September 2012	Belgrade, Serbia	Clay	(Slovakia) Karin Morgosova	(Serbia) Natalija Kostić (Slovakia) Lucia Butkovská	0–6, 3–6
Winner	5.	11 August 2013	Vienna, Austria	Clay	(Slovakia) Rebecca Šramková	(Japan) Hiroko Kuwata (Japan) Hirono Watanabe	7–5, 6–2
