= Patricia Mayr-Achleitner =

Austrian tennis player

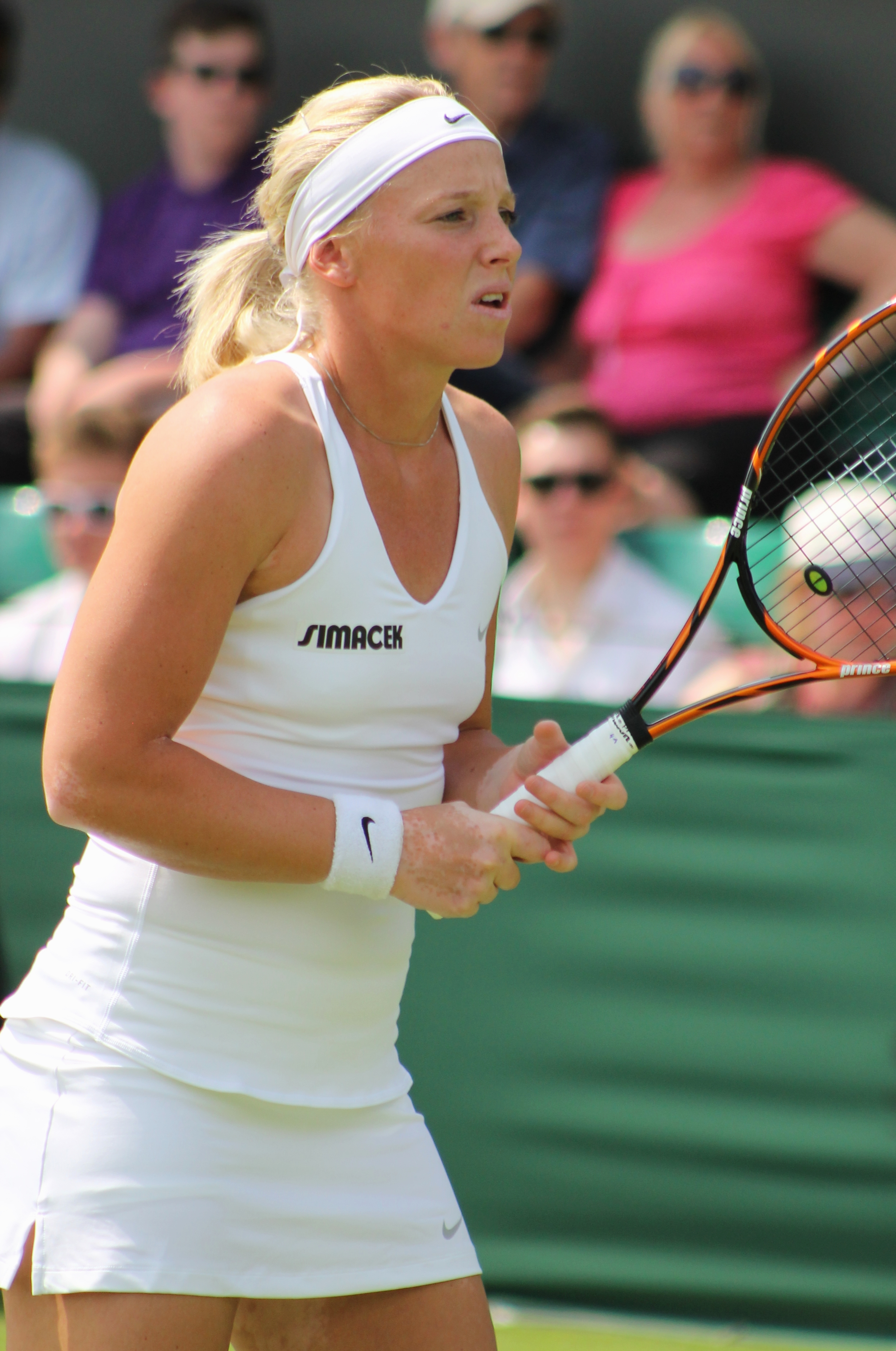
- Mayr-Achleitner at the 2014 Wimbledon Championships
- Country (sports): Austria
- Born: 8 November 1986 (age 39) Rum, Austria
- Height: 1.69 m (5 ft 7 in)
- Retired: October 2015
- Plays: Right-handed (two-handed backhand)
- Prize money: $976,233

Singles
- Career record: 364–258
- Career titles: 17 ITF
- Highest ranking: No. 70 (4 May 2009)

Grand Slam singles results
- Australian Open: 2R (2009)
- French Open: 1R (2009, 2011, 2012, 2014)
- Wimbledon: 2R (2009)
- US Open: 2R (2013)

Doubles
- Career record: 81–76
- Career titles: 7 ITF
- Highest ranking: No. 117 (29 September 2014)

Grand Slam doubles results
- French Open: 1R (2012)
- Wimbledon: 2R (2014)
- US Open: 2R (2009)

Team competitions
- Fed Cup: 14–15

Patricia Mayr-Achleitner (née Mayr; born 8 November 1986) is a retired Austrian tennis player.

Mayr-Achleitner won 17 singles titles and seven doubles titles on the ITF Women's Circuit in her career. On 4 May 2009, she reached her best singles ranking of world No. 70. On 29 September 2014, she peaked at No. 117 in the doubles rankings.

Playing for Austria in Fed Cup competitions, Mayr-Achleitner has a win–loss record of 14–15.

On 4 December 2010, she married her coach Michael Achleitner.

On 22 July 2015, after failing at the 2015 Gastein Ladies, Mayr-Achleitner announced that the 2015 Linz Open would be her last tournament, stating chronic back pain as the reason for her retirement from professional tennis.

== Career ==
=== Early years and breakthrough (2005–2009) ===
Mayr began her professional career on the ITF circuit, winning her first two titles in 2005 in Volos, Greece and Benicarló, Spain. In 2009; at the Australian Open, she successfully qualified for the main draw and defeated Julia Schruff to reach the second round of a Grand Slam for the first time. Later that year at Wimbledon, she defeated British No. 1 Anne Keothavong in the first round.

== Grand Slam performance timelines ==
Key
W	F	SF	QF	#R	RR	Q#	P#	DNQ	A	Z#	PO	G	S	B	NMS	NTI	P	NH

(W) winner; (F) finalist; (SF) semifinalist; (QF) quarterfinalist; (#R) rounds 4, 3, 2, 1; (RR) round-robin stage; (Q#) qualification round; (P#) preliminary round; (DNQ) did not qualify; (A) absent; (Z#) Davis/Fed Cup Zonal Group (with number indication) or (PO) play-off; (G) gold, (S) silver or (B) bronze Olympic/Paralympic medal; (NMS) not a Masters tournament; (NTI) not a Tier I tournament; (P) postponed; (NH) not held; (SR) strike rate (events won / competed); (W–L) win–loss record.
To avoid confusion and double counting, these charts are updated at the conclusion of a tournament or when the player's participation has ended.

=== Singles ===
Tournament	2009	2010	2011	2012	2013	2014	2015	W–L
Australian Open	2R	1R	1R	1R	A	1R	Q1	1–5
French Open	1R	Q1	1R	1R	Q1	1R	Q1	0–4
Wimbledon	2R	Q1	1R	1R	Q2	1R	Q1	1–4
US Open	1R	Q3	1R	Q1	2R	1R	Q1	1–4
Win–loss	2–4	0–1	0–4	0–3	1–1	0–4	0–0	3–17

=== Doubles ===
Tournament	2009	...	2012	2013	2014	2015	W–L
Australian Open	A		A	A	A	A	0–0
French Open	A		1R	A	A	A	0–1
Wimbledon	A		A	A	2R	A	1–1
US Open	2R		A	A	A	A	1–1
Win–loss	1–1		0–1	0–0	1–1	0–0	2–3

== WTA Tour finals ==
=== Singles: 1 (runner-up) ===
Result	Date	Tournament	Tier	Surface	Opponent	Score
Loss	Jul 2011	Gastein Ladies, Austria	International	Clay	(Spain) María José Martínez Sánchez	0–6, 5–7

=== Doubles: 1 (runner-up) ===
Result	Date	Tournament	Tier	Surface	Partner	Opponents	Score
Loss	Sep 2014	Hong Kong Open	International	Hard	(Australia) Arina Rodionova	(Czech Republic) Karolína Plíšková (Czech Republic) Kristýna Plíšková	2–6, 6–2, [10–12]

== ITF finals ==
=== Singles: 32 (17 titles, 15 runner-ups) ===
Legend
$100,000 tournaments (0–2)
$50,000 tournaments (4–0)
$25,000 tournaments (9–8)
$10,000 tournaments (4–5)

Result	W–L	Date	Tournament	Tier	Surface	Opponent	Score
Win	1–0	Oct 2005	ITF Volos, Greece	10,000	Carpet	(Bulgaria) Dia Evtimova	6–4, 7–6^{(5)}
Win	2–0	Oct 2005	ITF Benicarlo, Spain	10,000	Clay	(Spain) Berta Morata Flaquer	6–4, 6–2
Win	3–0	Sep 2006	ITF Innsbruck, Austria	10,000	Clay	(Austria) Yvonne Meusburger	1–6, 6–2, 2–2 ret.
Loss	3–1	Oct 2006	ITF Volos, Greece	10,000	Carpet	(Greece) Anna Gerasimou	3–6, 6–2, 1–6
Loss	3–2	Apr 2007	ITF Split, Croatia	10,000	Clay	(Poland) Olga Brózda	6–7^{(3)}, 0–6
Loss	3–3	May 2007	ITF Bucharest, Romania	10,000	Clay	(Romania) Simona Halep	3–6, 6–3, 2–6
Loss	3–4	Jun 2007	ITF Lenzerheide, Switzerland	10,000	Clay	(Austria) Melanie Klaffner	6–7^{(2)}, 4–6
Win	4–4	Apr 2008	ITF Hvar, Croatia	10,000	Clay	(Slovakia) Lenka Juríková	6–4, 6–2
Loss	4–5	May 2008	ITF Brescia, Italy	10,000	Clay	(Switzerland) Lisa Sabino	3–6, 3–6
Loss	4–6	May 2008	ITF Caserta, Italy	25,000	Clay	(Australia) Jelena Dokic	3–6, 1–6
Loss	4–7	Jun 2008	ITF Tolyatti, Russia	25,000	Hard	(Russia) Nina Bratchikova	3–6, 0–6
Win	5–7	Jun 2008	Grado Tennis Cup, Italy	25,000	Clay	(Bosnia and Herzegovina) Jasmina Tinjić	6–4, 7–6^{(1)}
Loss	5–8	Jul 2008	ITF Rome, Italy	25,000	Clay	(Australia) Jessica Moore	3–6, 2–6
Win	6–8	Aug 2008	ITF Dnipropetrovsk, Ukraine	50,000	Clay	(Belarus) Ekaterina Dzehalevich	6–3, 6–4
Win	7–8	Oct 2008	ITF Reggio Calabria, Italy	25,000	Clay	(Germany) Anne Schäfer	6–1, 6–1
Loss	7–9	Oct 2008	GB Pro-Series Glasgow, United Kingdom	25,000	Hard	(Romania) Irina-Camelia Begu	6–2, 5–7, 6–7^{(1)}
Loss	7–10	Nov 2008	ITF Phoenix, Mauritius	25,000	Hard	(Belarus) Anastasiya Yakimova	6–3, 2–6, 0–1 ret.
Win	8–10	Nov 2008	ITF Saint Denis, France	25,000	Hard	(Spain) Arantxa Parra Santonja	6–4, 6–1
Win	9–10	May 2010	ITF Jounieh Open, Lebanon	50,000	Clay	(Czech Republic) Renata Voráčová	6–3, 6–7^{(3)}, 7–6^{(7)}
Win	10–10	Jun 2010	Zlín Open, Czech Republic	50,000	Clay	(Italy) Corinna Dentoni	6–1, 6–2
Win	11–10	Jun 2010	ITF Rome, Italy	25,000	Clay	(Kazakhstan) Zarina Diyas	7–6^{(2)}, 6–4
Win	12–10	Aug 2010	ITS Cup Olomouc, Czech Republic	25,000	Clay	(Italy) Julia Mayr	6–2, 6–4
Win	13–10	Apr 2011	ITF Buenos Aires, Argentina	25,000	Clay	(Argentina) Florencia Molinero	0–6, 6–2, 6–2
Win	14–10	Jun 2011	ITF Zlín, Сzech Republic	50,000	Clay	(Russia) Ksenia Pervak	6–1, 6–0
Loss	14–11	Jul 2011	Open de Biarritz, France	100,000	Clay	(France) Pauline Parmentier	6–1, 4–6, 4–6
Loss	14–12	May 2012	Open de Cagnes-sur-Mer, France	100,000	Clay	(Kazakhstan) Yulia Putintseva	2–6, 1–6
Loss	14–13	Mar 2013	Innisbrook Open, United States	25,000	Clay	(Israel) Julia Glushko	6–2, 0–6, 4–6
Loss	14–14	Jun 2013	ITF Padua, Italy	25,000	Clay	(Russia) Irina Khromacheva	2–6, 3–6
Loss	14–15	Aug 2013	ITF Bad Saulgau, Germany	25,000	Clay	(Hungary) Réka Luca Jani	6–7^{(4)}, 3–6
Win	15–15	Sep 2013	ITF Sofia, Bulgaria	25,000	Clay	(Slovakia) Kristína Kučová	6–2, 1–6, 6–3
Win	16–15	Sep 2013	ITF Dobrich, Bulgaria	25,000	Clay	(Romania) Cristina Dinu	6–1, 6–2
Win	17–15	Aug 2014	ITF Winnipeg, Canada	25,000	Hard	(Japan) Mayo Hibi	6–2, 6–2

=== Doubles: 14 (7 titles, 7 runner-ups) ===
Legend
$100,000 tournaments (0–1)
$25,000 tournaments (3–6)
$10,000 tournaments (4–0)

Result	W–L	Date	Tournament	Tier	Surface	Partner	Opponents	Score
Win	1–0	Oct 2005	ITF Benicarlo, Spain	10,000	Clay	(Sweden) Sofia Brun	(Spain) Elena Caldes-Marques (Spain) Mariona Gallifa Puigdesens	7–5, 1–6, 6–2
Win	2–0	Sep 2006	ITF Innsbruck, Austria	10,000	Clay	(Austria) Yvonne Meusburger	(Czech Republic) Hana Birnerová (Czech Republic) Zuzana Zálabská	6–3, 6–3
Win	3–0	Oct 2006	ITF Volos, Greece	10,000	Carpet	(Austria) Franziska Klotz	(Italy) Nicole Clerico (Greece) Anna Koumantou	4–6, 7–6^{(5)}, 6–3
Loss	3–1	Nov 2006	ITF Mexico City	25,000	Hard	(Austria) Yvonne Meusburger	(Argentina) María José Argeri (Brazil) Letícia Sobral	4–6, 2–6
Loss	3–2	Jul 2007	ITF Rome, Italy	25,000	Clay	(Ukraine) Irina Buryachok	(Chinese Taipei) Chan Chin-wei (Ukraine) Tetiana Luzhanska	3–6, 1–6
Win	4–2	Apr 2008	ITF Hvar, Croatia	10,000	Clay	(Italy) Vivienne Vierin	(Slovakia) Lenka Juríková (Slovakia) Monika Kochanová	6–4, 7–6^{(2)}
Loss	4–3	May 2008	ITF Tolyatti, Russia	25,000	Clay	(Czech Republic) Nikola Fraňková	(Russia) Nina Bratchikova (Russia) Vasilisa Davydova	3–6, 7–5, [3–10]
Win	5–3	Jun 2008	ITF Kristinehamn, Sweden	25,000	Clay	(Slovakia) Lenka Tvarošková	(Belgium) Tamaryn Hendler (Finland) Emma Laine	6–3, 6–4
Loss	5–4	Jul 2008	ITF Rome, Italy	25,000	Clay	(Ukraine) Irina Buryachok	(Latvia) Irina Kuzmina (Ukraine) Oksana Lyubtsova	4–6, 6–4, [7–10]
Loss	5–5	Oct 2008	ITF Helsinki, Finland	25,000	Hard (i)	(Canada) Marie-Ève Pelletier	(Finland) Emma Laine (Sweden) Johanna Larsson	4–6, 2–6
Loss	5–6	Oct 2008	ITF Reggio Calabria, Italy	25,000	Clay	(Italy) Nicole Clerico	(Italy) Anna Floris (Italy) Valentina Sulpizio	2–6, 3–6
Win	6–6	Aug 2009	ITF Monteroni, Italy	25,000	Clay	(Austria) Sandra Klemenschits	(Georgia (country)) Margalita Chakhnashvili (Italy) Nicole Clerico	6–3, 6–4
Win	7–6	Aug 2010	ITS Cup Olomouc, Czech Republic	25,000	Clay	(Austria) Sandra Klemenschits	(Czech Republic) Iveta Gerlová (Czech Republic) Lucie Kriegsmannová	6–3, 6–1
Loss	7–7	Aug 2014	Open Bogotá, Colombia	100,000	Clay	(Austria) Melanie Klaffner	(Spain) Lara Arruabarrena (Argentina) Florencia Molinero	2–6, 0–6
