= Margalita Chakhnashvili =

Georgian tennis player

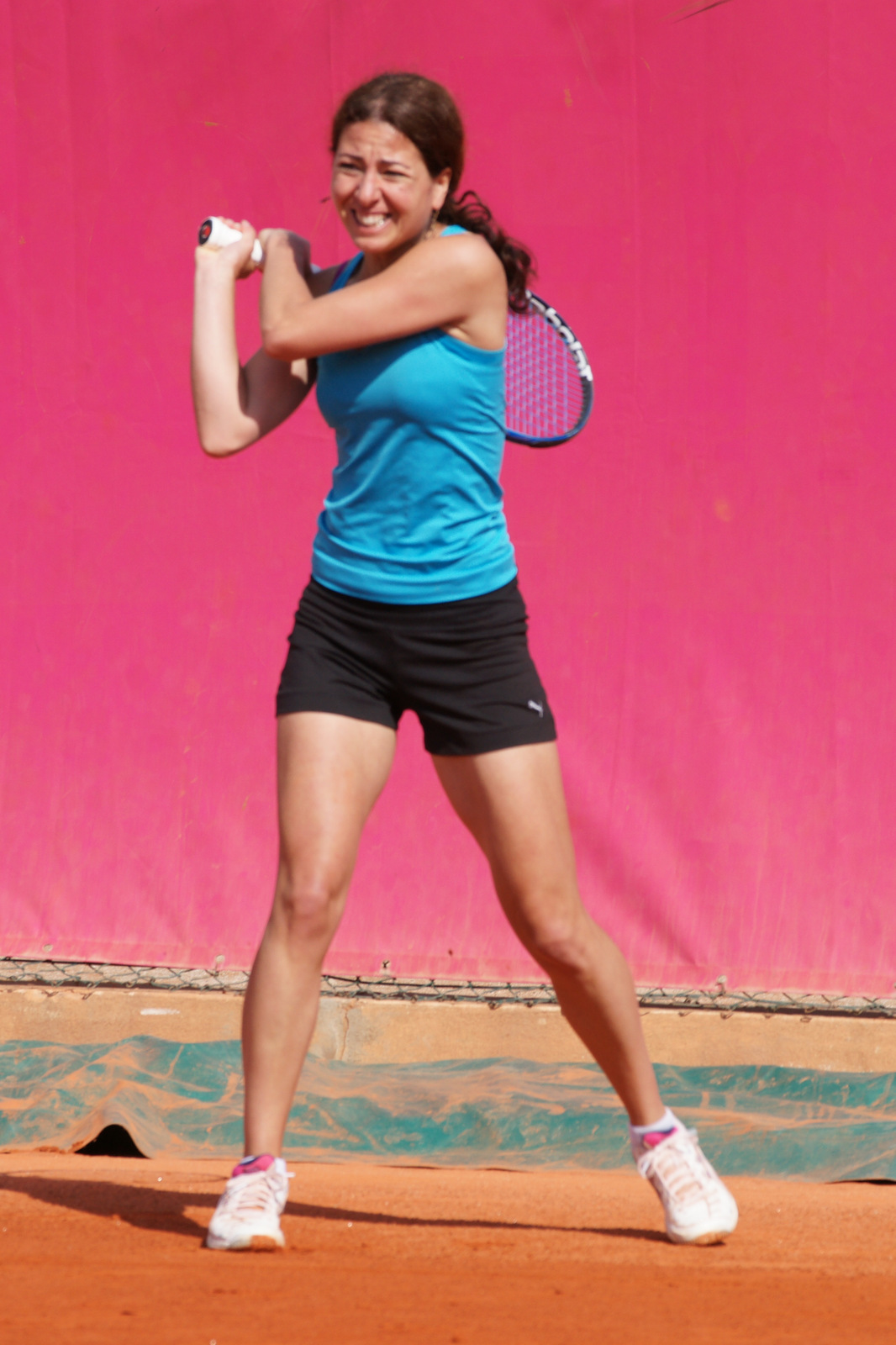
- Chakhnashvili at the 2012 Open GdF Suez
- Full name: Margalita Chakhnashvili-Ranzinger
- Country (sports): Georgia
- Born: 9 December 1982 (age 43) Tbilisi, Georgian SSR, Soviet Union
- Height: 1.72 m (5 ft 8 in)
- Turned pro: 1999
- Prize money: $313,995

Singles
- Career record: 403–326
- Career titles: 10 ITF
- Highest ranking: No. 134 (30 July 2007)

Grand Slam singles results
- Australian Open: Q1 (2007, 2009, 2010, 2012)
- French Open: Q2 (2007, 2008)
- Wimbledon: Q1 (2007, 2008, 2010, 2012)
- US Open: Q3 (2007)

Doubles
- Career record: 139–161
- Career titles: 5 ITF
- Highest ranking: No. 149 (15 June 2009)

Other doubles tournaments
- Olympic Games: 1R (2012)

Team competitions
- Fed Cup: 30–27

Margalita "Maka" Chakhnashvili-Ranzinger (Georgian: მარგალიტა "მაკა" ჩახნაშვილი, romanized: margalit'a "mak'a" chakhnashvili, pronounced [maɾɡalitʼa makʼa tʃʰaχnaʃʷili]; born 9 December 1982) is a Georgian former tennis player.

Chakhnashvili won ten singles and five doubles titles on the ITF Women's Circuit. On 30 July 2007, she reached her best singles ranking of world No. 134. On 15 June 2009, she peaked at No. 149 in the doubles rankings.

She achieved a 30–27 record for Georgia in Fed Cup competition.

Chakhnashvili was given a wildcard to represent Georgia at the 2012 Summer Olympics in the women's doubles draw. She teamed up with Anna Tatishvili but they lost in the first round.

== ITF finals ==
=== Singles (10–12) ===
Legend $50,000 tournaments $25,000 tournaments $10,000 tournaments	Finals by surface Hard (2–3) Clay (8–8) Carpet (0–1)

Result	No.	Date	Location	Surface	Opponent	Score
Loss	1.	3 February 2002	Mallorca, Spain	Clay	(Russia) Dinara Safina	3–6, 6–3, 5–7
Loss	2.	21 April 2002	Cagliari, Italy	Clay	(Italy) Laura dell'Angelo	3–6, 6–7^{(4)}
Win	1.	15 September 2002	Sofia, Bulgaria	Clay	(Bulgaria) Desislava Topalova	6–3, 4–6, 6–0
Loss	3.	12 September 2004	Tbilisi, Georgia	Clay	(Russia) Maria Kondratieva	5–7, 4–6
Loss	4.	4 June 2005	Ra'anana, Israel	Hard	(Israel) Tzipora Obziler	0–6, 2–6
Win	2.	18 September 2005	Tbilisi, Georgia	Clay	(Georgia (country)) Manana Shapakidze	6–2, 6–1
Win	3.	3 December 2005	Ramat HaSharon, Israel	Hard	(Canada) Sharon Fichman	6–3, 7–6^{(4)}
Win	4.	10 December 2005	Ra'anana, Israel	Hard	(Israel) Tzipora Obziler	6–3, 7–5
Win	5.	14 May 2006	Antalya, Turkey	Clay	(France) Claire de Gubernatis	6–1, 7–5
Loss	5.	24 June 2006	Fontanafredda, Italy	Clay	(Czech Republic) Renata Voráčová	3–6, 3–6
Win	6.	6 August 2006	Martina Franca, Italy	Clay	(Italy) Karin Knapp	6–3, 7–5
Loss	6.	3 December 2006	Milan, Italy	Carpet (i)	(Italy) Roberta Vinci	2–6, 4–6
Win	7.	1 July 2007	Padua, Italy	Clay	(Czech Republic) Sandra Záhlavová	3–6, 6–1, 6–3
Loss	7.	30 March 2008	Hammond, United States	Hard	(United States) Carly Gullickson	4–6, 6–4, 4–6
Loss	8.	7 June 2009	Galatina, Italy	Clay	(Spain) Eva Fernández Brugués	6–3, 3–6, 2–6
Win	8.	20 September 2009	Naples, Italy	Clay	(Slovakia) Michaela Pochabová	6–2, 6–1
Loss	9.	26 June 2010	Périgueux, France	Clay	(Czech Republic) Petra Cetkovská	6–2, 1–6, 1–6
Win	9.	3 October 2010	Tbilisi, Georgia	Clay	(Georgia (country)) Tatia Mikadze	6–4, 3–6, 7–5
Win	10.	9 April 2011	Pomezia, Italy	Clay	(Italy) Annalisa Bona	1–6, 6–2, 6–2
Loss	10.	18 June 2011	Istanbul, Turkey	Hard	(Poland) Marta Domachowska	5–7, 3–6
Loss	11.	16 October 2011	Sant Cugat del Vallès, Spain	Clay	(Hungary) Réka Luca Jani	4–6, 2–6
Loss	12.	7 December 2013	Duino-Aurisina, Italy	Clay (i)	(Italy) Anastasia Grymalska	3–6, 4–6

=== Doubles (5–10) ===
Legend $75,000 tournaments $50,000 tournaments $25,000 tournaments $10,000 tournaments	Finals by surface Hard (1–4) Clay (4–5) Carpet (0–1)

Outcome	No.	Date	Location	Surface	Partner	Opponents	Score
Runner-up	1.	3 October 1998	Tbilisi, Georgia	Clay	(Georgia (country)) Sophia Managadze	(Belarus) Olga Glouschenko (Belarus) Tatiana Poutchek	2–6, 4–6
Runner-up	2.	10 February 2006	Capriolo, Italy	Carpet (i)	(Russia) Ekaterina Ivanova	(Belarus) Darya Kustova (Russia) Ekaterina Makarova	2–6, 4–6
Winner	1.	13 May 2006	Antalya, Turkey	Clay	(Turkey) İpek Şenoğlu	(France) Claire de Gubernatis (Romania) Alexandra Dulgheru	6–4, 6–3
Winner	2.	8 July 2006	Mont-de-Marsan, France	Clay	(Romania) Raluca Olaru	(Uzbekistan) Akgul Amanmuradova (Russia) Nina Bratchikova	7–5, 1–6, 6–1
Runner-up	3.	10 September 2006	Mestre, Italy	Clay	(Germany) Tatjana Malek	(Romania) Monica Niculescu (Czech Republic) Renata Voráčová	4–6, 6–3, 4–6
Runner-up	4.	8 July 2007	Cuneo, Italy	Clay	(Ukraine) Yuliya Beygelzimer	(Belarus) Darya Kustova (Russia) Ekaterina Makarova	2–6, 6–2, 2–6
Runner-up	5.	20 October 2007	Saint-Raphaël, France	Hard (i)	(Belarus) Ksenia Milevskaya	(United States) Lilia Osterloh (Russia) Ekaterina Makarova	2–6, 2–6
Runner-up	6.	20 September 2008	Mestre, Italy	Clay	(France) Violette Huck	(Bosnia and Herzegovina) Mervana Jugić-Salkić (France) Aurélie Védy	2–6, 3–6
Runner-up	7.	10 April 2009	Monzón, Spain	Hard	(Italy) Alberta Brianti	(Chinese Taipei) Chen Yi (Russia) Vesna Manasieva	6–2, 4–6, [8–10]
Runner-up	8.	8 August 2009	Monteroni, Italy	Clay	(Italy) Nicole Clerico	(Austria) Sandra Klemenschits (Austria) Patricia Mayr	3–6, 4–6
Winner	3.	22 August 2009	Westende, Belgium	Hard	(Russia) Vasilisa Davydova	(France) Émilie Bacquet (Germany) Jasmin Wöhr	6–2, 7–5
Runner-up	9.	24 October 2009	Saint-Raphaël, France	Hard (i)	(Spain) Sílvia Soler Espinosa	(France) Claire Feuerstein (France) Stéphanie Foretz	6–7^{(4)}, 5–7
Runner-up	10.	31 March 2011	Monzón, Spain	Hard	(Croatia) Ivana Lisjak	(Russia) Elena Bovina (Russia) Valeria Savinykh	1–6, 6–2, [4–10]
Winner	4.	12 June 2011	Zlín, Czech Republic	Clay	(Ukraine) Yuliya Beygelzimer	(Hungary) Réka Luca Jani (Hungary) Katalin Marosi	3–6, 6–1, [10–8]
Winner	5.	2 June 2012	Grado, Italy	Clay	(Georgia (country)) Ekaterine Gorgodze	(Italy) Claudia Giovine (Italy) Anastasia Grymalska	7–6^{(2)}, 7–6^{(1)}
