= 2008 Odlum Brown Vancouver Open =

- Date: July 28 – August 3
- Edition: 4th (men); 7th (women)
- Category: ATP Challenger Tour; ITF Women's Circuit
- Prize money: US$100,000 (men); US$50,000 (women)
- Surface: Hard – outdoors
- Location: West Vancouver, British Columbia, Canada
- Venue: Hollyburn Country Club

Champions

Men's singles
- (Israel) Dudi Sela

Women's singles
- (Poland) Urszula Radwańska

Men's doubles
- (United States) Eric Butorac / (United States) Travis Parrott

Women's doubles
- (United States) Carly Gullickson / (Australia) Nicole Kriz
← 2007 ·	Vancouver Open	· 2009 →

The 2008 Odlum Brown Vancouver Open was a professional tennis tournament played on outdoor hard courts. It was the 4th edition, for men, and 7th edition, for women, of the tournament and part of the 2008 ATP Challenger Series and the 2008 ITF Women's Circuit, offering totals of $100,000, for men, and $50,000, for women, in prize money. It took place in West Vancouver, British Columbia, between July 28 and August 3, 2008.

== Men's singles main-draw entrants ==
=== Seeds ===
Country	Player	Rank^{1}	Seed
TPE	Lu Yen-hsun	70	1
USA	Bobby Reynolds	92	2
ISR	Dudi Sela	98	3
COL	Alejandro Falla	116	4
USA	Robert Kendrick	125	5
JPN	Go Soeda	126	6
DEN	Kristian Pless	128	7
USA	Sam Warburg	140	8

- ^{1} Rankings are as of July 21, 2008

=== Other entrants ===
The following players received wildcards into the singles main draw:

- (Canada) Philip Bester
- (United States) Michael McClune
- (United States) Nicholas Monroe
- (Canada) Peter Polansky

The following player entered the singles main draw with a special exempt:

- (India) Somdev Devvarman

The following players received entry from the qualifying draw:

- (Paraguay) Ramón Delgado
- (South Korea) Im Kyu-tae
- (Israel) Noam Okun
- (United States) Phillip Simmonds

The following player received entry as a lucky loser:

- (Philippines) Cecil Mamiit

== Champions ==
=== Men's singles ===
(Israel) Dudi Sela def. (United States) Kevin Kim, 6–3, 6–0

=== Women's singles ===
(Poland) Urszula Radwańska def. (France) Julie Coin, 2–6, 6–3, 7–5

=== Men's doubles ===
(United States) Eric Butorac / (United States) Travis Parrott def. (South Africa) Rik de Voest / (Australia) Ashley Fisher, 6–4, 7–6^{(7–3)}

=== Women's doubles ===
(United States) Carly Gullickson / (Australia) Nicole Kriz def. (United States) Christina Fusano / (Japan) Junri Namigata, 6–7^{(4–7)}, 6–1, [10–5]
