= 2007 Odlum Brown Vancouver Open =

- Date: July 28 – August 5
- Edition: 3rd (men); 6th (women)
- Category: ATP Challenger Tour; ITF Women's Circuit
- Prize money: US$100,000 (men); US$50,000 (women)
- Surface: Hard – outdoors
- Location: West Vancouver, British Columbia, Canada
- Venue: Hollyburn Country Club

Champions

Men's singles
- (Canada) Frédéric Niemeyer

Women's singles
- (United Kingdom) Anne Keothavong

Men's doubles
- (South Africa) Rik de Voest / (Australia) Ashley Fisher

Women's doubles
- (Canada) Stéphanie Dubois / (Canada) Marie-Ève Pelletier
| ← 2006 · | Vancouver Open | · 2008 → |

The 2007 Odlum Brown Vancouver Open was a professional tennis tournament played on outdoor hard courts. It was the 3rd edition for men, and 6th edition for women, of the tournament and part of the 2007 ATP Challenger Series and the 2007 ITF Women's Circuit, offering totals of $100,000 for men, and $50,000 for women, in prize money. It took place in West Vancouver, British Columbia, between July 28 and August 5, 2007.

== Men's singles main-draw entrants ==
=== Seeds ===
| Country | Player | Rank^{1} | Seed |
|---|---|---|---|
| USA | Sam Querrey | 90 | 1 |
| THA | Danai Udomchoke | 104 | 2 |
| TPE | Lu Yen-Hsun | 112 | 3 |
| USA | Bobby Reynolds | 118 | 4 |
| RSA | Rik de Voest | 125 | 5 |
| USA | Zack Fleishman | 140 | 6 |
| ISR | Noam Okun | 143 | 7 |
| MEX | Bruno Echagaray | 140 | 8 |

- ^{1} Rankings are as of July 25, 2007

=== Other entrants ===
The following players received wildcards into the singles main draw:

- (United States) Donald Young
- (United States) Phillip Simmonds
- (Canada) Philip Bester
- (Canada) Peter Polansky

The following player entered the singles main draw with a special exempt:

- (United States) Brian Wilson
- (Canada) Milan Pokrajac

The following players received entry from the qualifying draw:

- (United States) Phillip King
- (United States) Nikita Kryvonos
- (Australia) Colin Ebelthite
- (United States) Nicholas Monroe

== Champions ==
=== Men's singles ===
(Canada) Frédéric Niemeyer def. (United States) Sam Querrey, 4–6, 6–4, 6–3

=== Women's singles ===
(United Kingdom) Anne Keothavong def. (Canada) Stéphanie Dubois, 7–5, 6–1

=== Men's doubles ===
(South Africa) Rik de Voest / (Australia) Ashley Fisher def. (United States) Donald Young / (United States) Alex Kuznetsov, 6–1, 6–2

=== Women's doubles ===
(Canada) Stéphanie Dubois / (Canada) Marie-Ève Pelletier def. (Argentina) Soledad Esperón / (Argentina) Agustina Lepore, 6–4, 6–4
