= 2008 Odlum Brown Vancouver Open – Women's singles =

Women's singles
- 2008 Odlum Brown Vancouver Open

Final
- Champion: (Poland) Urszula Radwańska
- Runner-up: (France) Julie Coin
- Score: 2–6, 6–3, 7–5

Events
Singles	men	women
Doubles	men	women
← 2007 ·	Vancouver Open	· 2009 →

Anne Keothavong was the defending champion, but competed in Montreal at the same week.

Urszula Radwańska won the title by defeating Julie Coin 2–6, 6–3, 7–5 in the final.

== Seeds ==
1. (United States) Sunitha Rao (first round)
2. (Poland) Urszula Radwańska (champion)
3. (Japan) Rika Fujiwara (second round)
4. (France) Julie Coin (final)
5. (Russia) Regina Kulikova (second round)
6. (South Korea) Lee Ye-ra (quarterfinals)
7. (Japan) Junri Namigata (second round)
8. (United States) Lauren Albanese (first round)

== Draw ==
=== Key ===
- Q = Qualifier
- WC = Wild card
- LL = Lucky loser
- Alt = Alternate
- SE = Special exempt
- PR = Protected ranking
- ITF = ITF entry
- JE = Junior exempt
- w/o = Walkover
- r = Retired
- d = Defaulted
- SR = Special ranking

=== Finals ===
Semifinals
(United States) Madison Brengle	6	5	6^{4}
4	(France) Julie Coin	3	7	7^{7}
(United States) Carly Gullickson	2	1
2	(Poland) Urszula Radwańska	6	6

Final
4	(France) Julie Coin	6	3	5
2	(Poland) Urszula Radwańska	2	6	7

=== Top half ===
First round
1	(United States) S Rao	6	3	1
(United States) M Brengle	4	6	6
(United Kingdom) G Gent	6	6
WC	(Canada) Khristina Blajkevitch	4	2
WC	(Canada) Yuliana Motyl	2	1
(Chinese Taipei) I-h Hwang	6	6
(United States) G Brodsky	7	3	6
8	(United States) L Albanese	5	6	3
4	(France) J Coin	6	6
Q	(United States) A Prousis	0	4
(United States) J Cohen	1	6	4
(Republic of Ireland) K Liggan	6	3	6
(Czech Republic) N Fraňková	6	6
WC	(Canada) Stefi Gjine	0	4
(Chinese Taipei) C-w Chan	6^{5}	6^{7}
6	(South Korea) Y-r Lee	7^{7}	7^{9}

Second round
(United States) M Brengle	6	6
(United Kingdom) G Gent	3	4
(Chinese Taipei) I-h Hwang	3	3
(United States) G Brodsky	6	6
4	(France) J Coin	6	6
(Republic of Ireland) K Liggan	4	0
(Czech Republic) N Fraňková	4	6^{5}
6	(South Korea) Y-r Lee	6	7^{7}

Quarterfinals
(United States) M Brengle	6^{5}	6	6
(United States) G Brodsky	7^{7}	4	4
4	(France) J Coin	6	6
6	(South Korea) Y-r Lee	2	1

Semifinals
(United States) M Brengle	6	5	6^{4}
4	(France) J Coin	3	7	7^{7}

=== Bottom half ===
First round
7	(Japan) J Namigata	6	6
Q	(United States) Maureen Diaz	3	0
Q	(United States) S Perry	6	6
LL	(Canada) M Drake	2	1
Q	(United States) L Litvak	1	2
(United States) C Gullickson	6	6
(United States) A Podkolzina	1	1
3	(Japan) R Fujiwara	6	6
5	(Russia) R Kulikova	6	6
(Brazil) MF Alves	4	0
WC	(Canada) R Marino	6	6
(United States) L Lee-Waters	3	2
(United States) S Tweedie-Yates	6	6
(United States) A Glatch	3	4
(Australia) N Kriz	0	0
2	(Poland) U Radwańska	6	6

Second round
7	(Japan) J Namigata	1	4
Q	(United States) S Perry	6	6
(United States) C Gullickson	6	6^{5}	6
3	(Japan) R Fujiwara	2	7^{7}	1
5	(Russia) R Kulikova	6^{2}	3
WC	(Canada) R Marino	7^{7}	6
(United States) S Tweedie-Yates	3	2
2	(Poland) U Radwańska	6	6

Quarterfinals
Q	(United States) S Perry	4	3
(United States) C Gullickson	6	6
WC	(Canada) R Marino	2	5
2	(Poland) U Radwańska	6	7

Semifinals
(United States) C Gullickson	2	1
2	(Poland) U Radwańska	6	6
