= 2009 Odlum Brown Vancouver Open – Women's doubles =

Women's doubles
- 2009 Odlum Brown Vancouver Open

Final
- Champions: (United States) Ahsha Rolle (United States) Riza Zalameda
- Runners-up: (United States) Madison Brengle (United States) Lilia Osterloh
- Score: 6–4, 6–3

Events
Singles	men	women
Doubles	men	women
← 2008 ·	Vancouver Open	· 2010 →

Carly Gullickson and Nicole Kriz were the defending champions, but decided not to participate this year.

Ahsha Rolle and Riza Zalameda won the title, defeating Madison Brengle and Lilia Osterloh 6–4, 6–3 in the final.

== Seeds ==
1. (Canada) Sharon Fichman / (Canada) Marie-Ève Pelletier (semifinals)
2. (Chinese Taipei) Chen Yi / (United States) Mashona Washington (quarterfinals)
3. (Chinese Taipei) Chang Kai-chen / (Ukraine) Tetiana Luzhanska (quarterfinals)
4. (United States) Ahsha Rolle / (United States) Riza Zalameda (champions)

== Draw ==
=== Key ===
- Q = Qualifier
- WC = Wild card
- LL = Lucky loser
- Alt = Alternate
- SE = Special exempt
- PR = Protected ranking
- ITF = ITF entry
- JE = Junior exempt
- w/o = Walkover
- r = Retired
- d = Defaulted
- SR = Special ranking

First round
1	(Canada) S Fichman (Canada) M-È Pelletier	7	7^{7}
(United States) K Couts (Canada) V Tétreault	5	6^{2}
Q	(United States) L Lee-Waters (United States) A Weinhold	6	6^{4}	[13]
WC	(United States) L Albanese (United States) M Cecil	1	7^{7}	[11]
4	(United States) A Rolle (United States) R Zalameda	6	3	[10]
(Canada) H El Tabakh (Germany) L Siegemund	3	6	[6]
(United States) L Litvak (Canada) R Marino	4	6	[10]
WC	(United States) G Brodsky (United States) S Tan	6	2	[3]
(United States) M Brengle (United States) L Osterloh	6	5	[10]
LL	(Thailand) N Lertcheewakarn (Canada) K Paliivets	4	7	[6]
Q	(United States) J Cako (United States) S Tweedie-Yates	0	4
3	(Chinese Taipei) K-c Chang (Ukraine) T Luzhanska	6	6
(United States) C Fusano (United States) M Moulton-Levy	6	6
(Argentina) J Cravero (Georgia (country)) A Tatishvili	4	3
WC	(Canada) K Blajkevitch (Canada) M Jodoin	1	1
2	(Chinese Taipei) Y Chen (United States) M Washington	6	6

Quarterfinals
1	(Canada) S Fichman (Canada) M-È Pelletier	7^{13}	7
Q	(United States) L Lee-Waters (United States) A Weinhold	6^{11}	5
4	(United States) A Rolle (United States) R Zalameda	6	6
(United States) L Litvak (Canada) R Marino	1	3
(United States) M Brengle (United States) L Osterloh	7	6
3	(Chinese Taipei) K-c Chang (Ukraine) T Luzhanska	5	3
(United States) C Fusano (United States) M Moulton-Levy	5	6	[11]
2	(Chinese Taipei) Y Chen (United States) M Washington	7	3	[9]

Semifinals
1	(Canada) S Fichman (Canada) M-È Pelletier	5	3
4	(United States) A Rolle (United States) R Zalameda	7	6
(United States) M Brengle (United States) L Osterloh	6	6
(United States) C Fusano (United States) M Moulton-Levy	2	2

Final
4	(United States) A Rolle (United States) R Zalameda	6	6
(United States) M Brengle (United States) L Osterloh	4	3
