= 2009 Odlum Brown Vancouver Open – Men's doubles =

Men's doubles
- 2009 Odlum Brown Vancouver Open

Final
- Champions: (South Africa) Kevin Anderson (South Africa) Rik de Voest
- Runners-up: (Paraguay) Ramón Delgado (United States) Kaes Van't Hof
- Score: 6–4, 6–4

Events
| Singles | men | women |
| Doubles | men | women |
| ← 2008 · | Vancouver Open | · 2010 → |

Eric Butorac and Travis Parrott were the defending champions, but only Butorac tried to defend his title.

He partnered up with Scott Lipsky, but they lost to Alex Kuznetsov and Ryan Sweeting in the first round.

Kevin Anderson and Rik de Voest won in the final 6–4, 6–4, against Ramón Delgado and Kaes Van't Hof.

== Seeds ==
1. (United States) Eric Butorac / (United States) Scott Lipsky (first round)
2. (Thailand) Sanchai Ratiwatana / (Thailand) Sonchat Ratiwatana (first round)
3. (India) Prakash Amritraj / (Pakistan) Aisam-ul-Haq Qureshi (first round)
4. (United Kingdom) Colin Fleming / (United Kingdom) Ken Skupski (quarterfinals)

== Draw ==
=== Key ===
- Q = Qualifier
- WC = Wild card
- LL = Lucky loser
- Alt = Alternate
- SE = Special exempt
- PR = Protected ranking
- ITF = ITF entry
- JE = Junior exempt
- w/o = Walkover
- r = Retired
- d = Defaulted
- SR = Special ranking

=== Draw ===
First round
1 | (United States) E Butorac (United States) S Lipsky | 4 | 6^{1}
(United States) A Kuznetsov (United States) R Sweeting | 6 | 7
(Israel) A Hadad (Israel) H Levy | 7 | 6
(India) H Mankad (United States) D Martin | 6^{7} | 2
4 | (United Kingdom) C Fleming (United Kingdom) K Skupski | 6 | 6
(United States) B Battistone (United States) N Monroe | 3 | 4
(India) S Amritraj (United States) R Ram | 3 | 2
(South Africa) K Anderson (South Africa) R de Voest | 6 | 6
WC | (Cyprus) M Baghdatis (Argentina) J-F Spina | 7 | 6
WC | (Canada) P-L Duclos (Canada) V Pospisil | 6^{4} | 1
(South Korea) K-t Im (Australia) M Matosevic | 6 | 6
3 | (India) P Amritraj (Pakistan) A-u-H Qureshi | 2 | 2
Q | (Paraguay) R Delgado (United States) K Van't Hof | 7 | 6
WC | (United States) D Britton (United States) R Harrison | 5 | 1
(Australia) C Ball (Ukraine) S Bubka | 6 | 4 | [10]
2 | (Thailand) Sa Ratiwatana (Thailand) So Ratiwatana | 4 | 6 | [7]

Quarterfinals
(United States) A Kuznetsov (United States) R Sweeting | 6^{3} | 3
(Israel) A Hadad (Israel) H Levy | 7 | 6
4 | (United Kingdom) C Fleming (United Kingdom) K Skupski | 3 | 6 | [9]
(South Africa) K Anderson (South Africa) R de Voest | 6 | 3 | [11]
WC | (Cyprus) M Baghdatis (Argentina) J-F Spina | 6 | 6
(South Korea) K-t Im (Australia) M Matosevic | 4 | 4
Q | (Paraguay) R Delgado (United States) K Van't Hof | 6 | 3 | [10]
(Australia) C Ball (Ukraine) S Bubka | 4 | 6 | [8]

Semifinals
(Israel) A Hadad (Israel) H Levy | 6^{5} | 2
(South Africa) K Anderson (South Africa) R de Voest | 7 | 6
WC | (Cyprus) M Baghdatis (Argentina) J-F Spina | 4 | 6^{4}
Q | (Paraguay) R Delgado (United States) K Van't Hof | 6 | 7

Finals
(South Africa) K Anderson (South Africa) R de Voest | 6 | 6
Q | (Paraguay) R Delgado (United States) K Van't Hof | 4 | 4
