= 2009 Odlum Brown Vancouver Open =

- Date: August 3 – August 9
- Edition: 5th (men); 8th (women)
- Category: ATP Challenger Tour; ITF Women's Circuit
- Prize money: US$100,000 (men); US$75,000 (women)
- Surface: Hard – outdoors
- Location: West Vancouver, British Columbia, Canada
- Venue: Hollyburn Country Club

Champions

Men's singles
- (Cyprus) Marcos Baghdatis

Women's singles
- (Canada) Stéphanie Dubois

Men's doubles
- (South Africa) Kevin Anderson / (South Africa) Rik de Voest

Women's doubles
- (United States) Ahsha Rolle / (United States) Riza Zalameda
← 2008 ·	Vancouver Open	· 2010 →

The 2009 Odlum Brown Vancouver Open was a professional tennis tournament played on outdoor hard courts. It was the 5th edition, for men, and 8th edition, for women, of the tournament and part of the 2009 ATP Challenger Tour and the 2009 ITF Women's Circuit, offering totals of $100,000, for men, and $75,000, for women, in prize money. It took place in West Vancouver, British Columbia, Canada between August 3 and August 9, 2009.

== Men's singles main-draw entrants ==
=== Seeds ===
Country	Player	Rank^{1}	Seed
USA	Rajeev Ram	105	1
GER	Michael Berrer	111	2
CYP	Marcos Baghdatis	146	3
ISR	Harel Levy	150	4
USA	Ryan Sweeting	155	5
RSA	Kevin Anderson	157	6
SUI	Marco Chiudinelli	172	7
AUS	Marinko Matosevic	181	7

- ^{1} Rankings are as of July 27, 2009

=== Other entrants ===
The following players received wildcards into the singles main draw:

- (Canada) Philip Bester
- (United States) Devin Britton
- (United States) Taylor Dent
- (United States) Ryan Harrison

The following player entered the singles main draw with a special exempt:

- (South Africa) Kevin Anderson

The following players received entry from the qualifying draw:

- (United States) Lester Cook
- (Netherlands) Igor Sijsling
- (United States) Tim Smyczek
- (United States) Kaes Van't Hof

== Champions ==
=== Men's singles ===
(Cyprus) Marcos Baghdatis def. (Belgium) Xavier Malisse, 6–4, 6–4

=== Women's singles ===
(Canada) Stéphanie Dubois def. (India) Sania Mirza, 6–1, 6–4

=== Men's doubles ===
(South Africa) Kevin Anderson / (South Africa) Rik de Voest def. (Paraguay) Ramón Delgado / (United States) Kaes Van't Hof, 6–4, 6–4

=== Women's doubles ===
(United States) Ahsha Rolle / (United States) Riza Zalameda def. (United States) Madison Brengle / (United States) Lilia Osterloh, 6–4, 6–3
