= 2008 Odlum Brown Vancouver Open – Women's doubles =

Women's doubles
- 2008 Odlum Brown Vancouver Open

Final
- Champions: (United States) Carly Gullickson (Australia) Nicole Kriz
- Runners-up: (United States) Christina Fusano (Japan) Junri Namigata
- Score: 6–7^{(4–7)}, 6–1, [10–5]

Events
Singles	men	women
Doubles	men	women
← 2007 ·	Vancouver Open	· 2009 →

Stéphanie Dubois and Marie-Ève Pelletier were the defending champions, but none entered this year as both were competing in Montreal at the same week.

Carly Gullickson and Nicole Kriz won the title by defeating Christina Fusano and Junri Namigata 6–7^{(4–7)}, 6–1, [10–5] in the final.

== Seeds ==
1. (United States) Christina Fusano / (Japan) Junri Namigata (final)
2. (Chinese Taipei) Chan Chin-wei / (Japan) Rika Fujiwara (semifinals)
3. (United States) Sunitha Rao / (United States) Robin Stephenson (first round)
4. (United States) Carly Gullickson / (Australia) Nicole Kriz (champions)

== Draw ==
=== Key ===
- Q = Qualifier
- WC = Wild card
- LL = Lucky loser
- Alt = Alternate
- SE = Special exempt
- PR = Protected ranking
- ITF = ITF entry
- JE = Junior exempt
- w/o = Walkover
- r = Retired
- d = Defaulted
- SR = Special ranking

=== Draw ===
First round
1	(United States) C Fusano (Japan) J Namigata	3	6	[10]
(United States) G Brodsky (Poland) U Radwańska	6	2	[8]
(France) J Coin (United States) S Tweedie-Yates	7^{7}	6
(United States) M Brengle (United States) A Glatch	6^{3}	2
3	(United States) S Rao (United States) R Stephenson	2	4
(Brazil) MF Alves (United States) A Weinhold	6	6
WC	(Canada) Khristina Blajkevitch (Canada) Yuliana Motyl	1	2
WC	(Canada) M Drake (Canada) R Marino	6	6
WC	(Canada) Daniela Covello (United States) J Elie	4	7^{8}	[5]
(United States) L Albanese (United States) L Litvak	6	6^{6}	[10]
Q	(United States) W Jones (United States) Tiya Rolle	2	6^{3}
4	(United States) C Gullickson (Australia) N Kriz	6	7^{7}
(Czech Republic) N Fraňková (United States) A Prousis	6	6
(Chinese Taipei) I-h Hwang (South Korea) Y-r Lee	1	2
Q	(Slovakia) Dominika Diešková (United States) Mami Inoue	2	0
2	(Chinese Taipei) C-w Chan (Japan) R Fujiwara	6	6

Quarterfinals
1	(United States) C Fusano (Japan) J Namigata	6	4	[10]
(France) J Coin (United States) S Tweedie-Yates	3	6	[5]
(Brazil) MF Alves (United States) A Weinhold	6	6
WC	(Canada) M Drake (Canada) R Marino	2	2
(United States) L Albanese (United States) L Litvak	3	2
4	(United States) C Gullickson (Australia) N Kriz	6	6
(Czech Republic) N Fraňková (United States) A Prousis	2	2
2	(Chinese Taipei) C-w Chan (Japan) R Fujiwara	6	6

Semifinals
1	(United States) C Fusano (Japan) J Namigata	7	6
(Brazil) MF Alves (United States) A Weinhold	5	3
4	(United States) C Gullickson (Australia) N Kriz	6	6^{3}	[10]
2	(Chinese Taipei) C-w Chan (Japan) R Fujiwara	4	7^{7}	[8]

Final
1	(United States) C Fusano (Japan) J Namigata	7^{7}	1	[5]
4	(United States) C Gullickson (Australia) N Kriz	6^{4}	6	[10]
