= 2008 Odlum Brown Vancouver Open – Men's doubles =

Men's doubles
- 2008 Odlum Brown Vancouver Open

Final
- Champions: (United States) Eric Butorac (United States) Travis Parrott
- Runners-up: (South Africa) Rik de Voest (Australia) Ashley Fisher
- Score: 6–4, 7–6^{(7–3)}

Events
Singles	men	women
Doubles	men	women
← 2007 ·	Vancouver Open	· 2009 →

Rik de Voest and Ashley Fisher were the defending champions, but lost in the final 6–4, 7–6^{(7–3)} to tournament winners Eric Butorac and Travis Parrott.

== Seeds ==
1. (South Africa) Rik de Voest / (Australia) Ashley Fisher (final)
2. (Thailand) Sanchai Ratiwatana / (Thailand) Sonchat Ratiwatana (quarterfinals)
3. (United States) Eric Butorac / Travis Parrott (champions)
4. (South Africa) Chris Haggard / (Australia) Todd Perry (semifinals)

== Draw ==
=== Key ===
- Q = Qualifier
- WC = Wild card
- LL = Lucky loser
- Alt = Alternate
- SE = Special exempt
- PR = Protected ranking
- ITF = ITF entry
- JE = Junior exempt
- w/o = Walkover
- r = Retired
- d = Defaulted
- SR = Special ranking

=== Draw ===
First round
1	(South Africa) R de Voest (Australia) A Fisher	7	6
LL	(Kazakhstan) A Golubev (Italy) Marco Gualdi	5	4
WC	(United States) A Bogomolov Jr. (United States) R Kendrick	6	7^{7}
LL	(Canada) Kamil Pajkowski (Canada) Jeremy Salvo	1	6^{4}
4	(South Africa) C Haggard (Australia) T Perry	7^{7}	6
WC	(Italy) Adriano Biasella (Canada) V Pospisil	6^{3}	3
(Russia) A Kudryavtsev (Israel) D Sela	4	6	[10]
WC	(Canada) P Bester (Canada) P Polansky	6	2	[6]
Q	(United States) B Battistone (United States) D Battistone	6	6
(Australia) C Ball (United States) S Warburg	4	3
(Israel) H Levy (United States) J Thomas	4	6	[6]
3	(United States) E Butorac (United States) T Parrott	6	2	[10]
(United States) B Evans (United States) S Jenkins	1	4
(Canada) F Niemeyer (United States) B Reynolds	6	6
(United Kingdom) J Auckland (United Kingdom) A Bogdanovic	4	3
2	(Thailand) Sa Ratiwatana (Thailand) So Ratiwatana	6	6

Quarterfinals
1	(South Africa) R de Voest (Australia) A Fisher	6	6
WC	(United States) A Bogomolov Jr. (United States) R Kendrick	4	4
4	(South Africa) C Haggard (Australia) T Perry	6	7^{7}
(Russia) A Kudryavtsev (Israel) D Sela	3	6^{2}
Q	(United States) B Battistone (United States) D Battistone	6^{1}	3
3	(United States) E Butorac (United States) T Parrott	7^{7}	6
(Canada) F Niemeyer (United States) B Reynolds	6	5	[11]
2	(Thailand) Sa Ratiwatana (Thailand) So Ratiwatana	4	7	[9]

Semifinals
1	(South Africa) R de Voest (Australia) A Fisher	6^{3}	6	[10]
4	(South Africa) C Haggard (Australia) T Perry	7^{7}	1	[4]
3	(United States) E Butorac (United States) T Parrott	7^{7}	6
(Canada) F Niemeyer (United States) B Reynolds	6^{2}	2

Final
1	(South Africa) R de Voest (Australia) A Fisher	4	6^{3}
3	(United States) E Butorac (United States) T Parrott	6	7^{7}
