= Vancouver Challenger =

Vancouver Challenger can refer to one of two Challenger tennis tournaments held in Vancouver, British Columbia, Canada.

- Odlum Brown Vancouver Open, the current event, held for both men's and women's players
- Vancouver Challenger (1993), a one-time held event, in February 1993
