= 2009 French Open – Men's doubles =

Men's doubles
- 2009 French Open

Final
- Champions: (Czech Republic) Lukáš Dlouhý (India) Leander Paes
- Runners-up: (South Africa) Wesley Moodie (Belgium) Dick Norman
- Score: 3–6, 6–3, 6–2

Details
- Draw: 64
- Seeds: 16

Events
Singles	men	women		boys	girls
Doubles	men	women	mixed	boys	girls
WC Singles	men	women	quad
WC Doubles	men	women	quad
Legends	−45	45+	women
← 2008 ·	French Open	· 2010 →

Pablo Cuevas and Luis Horna were the defending champions, but lost in the third round to Igor Kunitsyn and Dmitry Tursunov.

Lukáš Dlouhý and Leander Paes won in the final 3–6, 6–3, 6–2 against Wesley Moodie and Dick Norman.

== Seeds ==
1. (Canada) Daniel Nestor / (Serbia) Nenad Zimonjić (semifinals)
2. (United States) Bob Bryan / (United States) Mike Bryan (semifinals)
3. (Czech Republic) Lukáš Dlouhý / (India) Leander Paes (champions)
4. (India) Mahesh Bhupathi / (The Bahamas) Mark Knowles (third round)
5. (Brazil) Bruno Soares / (Zimbabwe) Kevin Ullyett (quarterfinals)
6. (Poland) Mariusz Fyrstenberg / (Poland) Marcin Matkowski (second round)
7. (Belarus) Max Mirnyi / (Israel) Andy Ram (first round)
8. (Uruguay) Pablo Cuevas / (Peru) Luis Horna (third round)
9. (Poland) Łukasz Kubot / (Austria) Oliver Marach (second round)
10. (Brazil) Marcelo Melo / (Brazil) André Sá (first round)
11. (South Africa) Jeff Coetzee / (Australia) Jordan Kerr (first round)
12. (Czech Republic) František Čermák / (Slovakia) Michal Mertiňák (second round)
13. (Australia) Stephen Huss / (United Kingdom) Ross Hutchins (first round)
14. (South Africa) Rik de Voest / (Australia) Ashley Fisher (third round)
15. (United States) Travis Parrott / (Slovakia) Filip Polášek (second round)
16. (Czech Republic) Martin Damm / (Sweden) Robert Lindstedt (first round)

== Draw ==
=== Finals ===
Quarterfinals
1	(Canada) Daniel Nestor (Serbia) Nenad Zimonjić	6	6
(Russia) Igor Kunitsyn (Russia) Dmitry Tursunov	4	2
3	(Czech Republic) Lukáš Dlouhý (India) Leander Paes	6	7
5	(Brazil) Bruno Soares (Zimbabwe) Kevin Ullyett	2	6^{5}
(South Africa) Wesley Moodie (Belgium) Dick Norman	w/o
(Argentina) José Acasuso (Chile) Fernando González
(Spain) Marc López (Spain) Tommy Robredo	6^{1}	6	6^{2}
2	(United States) Bob Bryan (United States) Mike Bryan	7	4	7

Semifinals
1	(Canada) Daniel Nestor (Serbia) Nenad Zimonjić	6^{4}	6^{5}
3	(Czech Republic) Lukáš Dlouhý (India) Leander Paes	7	7
(South Africa) Wesley Moodie (Belgium) Dick Norman	0	7	6
2	(United States) Bob Bryan (United States) Mike Bryan	6	6^{5}	4

Final
3	(Czech Republic) Lukáš Dlouhý (India) Leander Paes	3	6	6
(South Africa) Wesley Moodie (Belgium) Dick Norman	6	3	2

=== Top half ===
==== Section 1 ====
First round
1	(Canada) D Nestor (Serbia) N Zimonjić	6	6
(Argentina) L Arnold Ker (Argentina) H Zeballos	3	4
(United Kingdom) J Murray (Czech Republic) P Vízner	3	2
(Czech Republic) L Friedl (Czech Republic) D Škoch	6	6
(Spain) D Ferrer (Spain) D Gimeno-Traver	6	7
(Croatia) I Karlović (Croatia) L Zovko	2	5
(Germany) C Kas (Netherlands) R Wassen	6^{6}	7	7
16	(Czech Republic) M Damm (Sweden) R Lindstedt	7	6^{5}	5
10	(Brazil) M Melo (Brazil) A Sá	4	5
(Russia) I Kunitsyn (Russia) D Tursunov	6	7
Alt	(Italy) F Fognini (Russia) T Gabashvili	6^{3}	6	6
Alt	(Switzerland) Y Allegro (Switzerland) M Chiudinelli	7	2	4
(Austria) J Knowle (Austria) J Melzer	6	6
(Spain) Ó Hernández (Spain) A Montañés	4	1
(France) A Clément (France) N Devilder	2	6^{2}
8	(Uruguay) P Cuevas (Peru) L Horna	6	7

Second round
1	(Canada) D Nestor (Serbia) N Zimonjić	6	6
(Czech Republic) L Friedl (Czech Republic) D Škoch	4	2
(Spain) D Ferrer (Spain) D Gimeno-Traver
(Germany) C Kas (Netherlands) R Wassen	w/o
(Russia) I Kunitsyn (Russia) D Tursunov	6	6
Alt	(Italy) F Fognini (Russia) T Gabashvili	2	3
(Austria) J Knowle (Austria) J Melzer	3	4
8	(Uruguay) P Cuevas (Peru) L Horna	6	6

Third round
1	(Canada) D Nestor (Serbia) N Zimonjić	6	6
(Germany) C Kas (Netherlands) R Wassen	0	3
(Russia) I Kunitsyn (Russia) D Tursunov	7	6
8	(Uruguay) P Cuevas (Peru) L Horna	6^{4}	4

Quarterfinals
1	(Canada) D Nestor (Serbia) N Zimonjić	6	6
(Russia) I Kunitsyn (Russia) D Tursunov	4	2

==== Section 2 ====
First round
3	(Czech Republic) L Dlouhý (India) L Paes	6	6
WC	(France) S de Chaunac (France) B Paire	1	3
(United States) J Cerretani (Ukraine) S Stakhovsky	6	4	6
(Spain) N Almagro (Spain) I Navarro	2	6	2
WC	(France) J Benneteau (France) N Mahut	6	5	6
WC	(France) J Haehnel (France) F Serra	3	7	4
(United States) D Martin (United States) S Querrey	5	5
15	(United States) T Parrott (Slovakia) F Polášek	7	7
11	(South Africa) J Coetzee (Australia) J Kerr	6	4	1
(Czech Republic) J Levinský (Slovakia) I Zelenay	1	6	6
(Spain) M Granollers (Spain) S Ventura	6	7
(Germany) P Petzschner (Austria) A Peya	1	6^{2}
(Italy) S Bolelli (Italy) A Seppi	6	7
WC	(France) S Grosjean (Ecuador) N Lapentti	4	6^{8}
(France) J Chardy (France) M Gicquel	6^{2}	4
5	(Brazil) B Soares (Zimbabwe) K Ullyett	7	6

Second round
3	(Czech Republic) L Dlouhý (India) L Paes	4	6	6
(United States) J Cerretani (Ukraine) S Stakhovsky	6	3	2
WC	(France) J Benneteau (France) N Mahut	6	6
15	(United States) T Parrott (Slovakia) F Polášek	2	4
(Czech Republic) J Levinský (Slovakia) I Zelenay	6	6
(Spain) M Granollers (Spain) S Ventura	2	3
(Italy) S Bolelli (Italy) A Seppi	3	1
5	(Brazil) B Soares (Zimbabwe) K Ullyett	6	6

Third round
3	(Czech Republic) L Dlouhý (India) L Paes	7	6
WC	(France) J Benneteau (France) N Mahut	6^{4}	3
(Czech Republic) J Levinský (Slovakia) I Zelenay	6	4	6^{6}
5	(Brazil) B Soares (Zimbabwe) K Ullyett	3	6	7

Quarterfinals
3	(Czech Republic) L Dlouhý (India) L Paes	6	7
5	(Brazil) B Soares (Zimbabwe) K Ullyett	2	6^{5}

=== Bottom half ===
==== Section 3 ====
First round
7	(Belarus) M Mirnyi (Israel) A Ram	6^{6}	3
(South Africa) W Moodie (Belgium) D Norman	7	6
(Czech Republic) J Hernych (Belgium) C Rochus	6^{3}	6	6
(Germany) A Beck (Switzerland) J-C Scherrer	7	2	4
(Sweden) S Aspelin (Australia) P Hanley	6	6
(Spain) F López (Spain) F Verdasco	4	4
Alt	(Germany) S Greul (Italy) A Motti	6^{5}	3
12	(Czech Republic) F Čermák (Slovakia) M Mertiňák	7	6
13	(Australia) S Huss (United Kingdom) R Hutchins	4	2
(Argentina) J Acasuso (Chile) F González	6	6
(India) R Bopanna (Israel) J Erlich	4	6^{10}
(Spain) G García-López (Argentina) S Roitman	6	7
(Sweden) J Brunström (Netherlands Antilles) J-J Rojer	6	6
(Russia) I Andreev (Russia) E Korolev	1	1
WC	(France) J Ouanna (France) J-W Tsonga	3	2
4	(India) M Bhupathi (The Bahamas) M Knowles	6	6

Second round
(South Africa) W Moodie (Belgium) D Norman	6	6
(Czech Republic) J Hernych (Belgium) C Rochus	4	4
(Sweden) S Aspelin (Australia) P Hanley	7	6
12	(Czech Republic) F Čermák (Slovakia) M Mertiňák	6^{5}	3
(Argentina) J Acasuso (Chile) F González	6	6
(Spain) G García-López (Argentina) S Roitman	1	3
(Sweden) J Brunström (Netherlands Antilles) J-J Rojer	5	7	6^{3}
4	(India) M Bhupathi (The Bahamas) M Knowles	7	6^{4}	7

Third round
(South Africa) W Moodie (Belgium) D Norman	3	6	7
(Sweden) S Aspelin (Australia) P Hanley	6	3	5
(Argentina) J Acasuso (Chile) F González	7	4	6
4	(India) M Bhupathi (The Bahamas) M Knowles	5	6	4

Quarterfinals
(South Africa) W Moodie (Belgium) D Norman	w/o
(Argentina) J Acasuso (Chile) F González

==== Section 4 ====
First round
6	(Poland) M Fyrstenberg (Poland) M Matkowski	6	6
(Argentina) S Prieto (Argentina) M Vassallo Argüello	4	3
(Spain) M López (Spain) T Robredo	4	6	7
(Argentina) JI Chela (Argentina) E Schwank	6	3	6^{4}
(United States) E Butorac (United States) S Lipsky	4	2
(Germany) M Kohlmann (Germany) A Waske	6	6
WC	(France) M Montcourt (France) É Roger-Vasselin	4	6	2
9	(Poland) Ł Kubot (Austria) O Marach	6	4	6
14	(South Africa) R de Voest (Australia) A Fisher	6	6
(Chinese Taipei) Y-h Lu (Germany) F Moser	2	2
(Serbia) D Vemić (Germany) M Zverev	6	6
WC	(France) M Llodra (France) F Santoro	4	4
(United States) R Ram (United States) B Reynolds	2	5
(Romania) A Pavel (Romania) H Tecău	6	7
(United States) R Ginepri (United States) R Kendrick	5	4
2	(United States) B Bryan (United States) M Bryan	7	6

Second round
6	(Poland) M Fyrstenberg (Poland) M Matkowski	4	6	4
(Spain) M López (Spain) T Robredo	6	4	6
(Germany) M Kohlmann (Germany) A Waske	7	7
9	(Poland) Ł Kubot (Austria) O Marach	6^{4}	6^{5}
14	(South Africa) R de Voest (Australia) A Fisher	6	7
(Serbia) D Vemić (Germany) M Zverev	3	6^{6}
(Romania) A Pavel (Romania) H Tecău	1	4
2	(United States) B Bryan (United States) M Bryan	6	6

Third round
(Spain) M López (Spain) T Robredo	6	6
(Germany) M Kohlmann (Germany) A Waske	3	4
14	(South Africa) R de Voest (Australia) A Fisher	3	4
2	(United States) B Bryan (United States) M Bryan	6	6

Quarterfinals
(Spain) M López (Spain) T Robredo	6^{1}	6	6^{2}
2	(United States) B Bryan (United States) M Bryan	7	4	7
