= 2009 Odlum Brown Vancouver Open – Women's singles =

Women's singles
- 2009 Odlum Brown Vancouver Open

Final
- Champion: (Canada) Stéphanie Dubois
- Runner-up: (India) Sania Mirza
- Score: 1–6, 6–4, 6–4

Events
Singles	men	women
Doubles	men	women
← 2008 ·	Vancouver Open	· 2010 →

Urszula Radwańska was the defending champion, but decided not to participate that year.

Stéphanie Dubois became the first Canadian women to win this title, defeating Sania Mirza 1–6, 6–4, 6–4 in the final.

== Seeds ==
1. (India) Sania Mirza (final)
2. (Canada) Stéphanie Dubois (champion)
3. (United States) Madison Brengle (second round)
4. (Canada) Valérie Tétreault (first round)
5. (Australia) Sophie Ferguson (second round)
6. (United States) Lauren Albanese (first round)
7. (Argentina) Jorgelina Cravero (first round)
8. (Australia) Olivia Rogowska (second round)

== Draw ==
=== Key ===
- Q = Qualifier
- WC = Wild card
- LL = Lucky loser
- Alt = Alternate
- SE = Special exempt
- PR = Protected ranking
- ITF = ITF entry
- JE = Junior exempt
- w/o = Walkover
- r = Retired
- d = Defaulted
- SR = Special ranking

=== Finals ===
Semifinals
1	(India) Sania Mirza	6^{6}	6	6
(Canada) Sharon Fichman	7^{8}	3	2
Q	(United States) Mashona Washington	2	6	3
2	(Canada) Stéphanie Dubois	6	4	6

Final
1	(India) Sania Mirza	6	4	4
2	(Canada) Stéphanie Dubois	1	6	6

=== Top half ===
First round
1	(India) S Mirza	6	7
Q	(United States) M Cecil	4	5
(Japan) A Nakamura	6	3	4^{r}
WC	(United States) L Granville	2	6	3
(Canada) R Marino	1	6	6
(United States) L Lee-Waters	6	2	3
WC	(Canada) K Paliivets	5	1
8	(Australia) O Rogowska	7	6
3	(United States) M Brengle	6	6
(Chinese Taipei) K-c Chang	3	3
WC	(United States) J Cohen	0	4
(Canada) S Fichman	6	6
Q	(United States) L Litvak	1	4
WC	(Canada) M-È Pelletier	6	6
(China) M Yuan	6	6
7	(Argentina) J Cravero	3	3

Second round
1	(India) S Mirza	6	7
WC	(United States) L Granville	2	5
(Canada) R Marino	7	7^{7}
8	(Australia) O Rogowska	5	6^{0}
3	(United States) M Brengle	2	2
(Canada) S Fichman	6	6
WC	(Canada) M-È Pelletier	6	6
(China) M Yuan	4	1

Quarterfinals
1	(India) S Mirza	7^{7}	6^{3}	6
(Canada) R Marino	6^{2}	7^{7}	4
(Canada) S Fichman	6	6
WC	(Canada) M-È Pelletier	4	4

Semifinals
1	(India) S Mirza	6^{6}	6	6
(Canada) S Fichman	7^{8}	3	2

=== Bottom half ===
First round
5	(Australia) S Ferguson	6	7
(United States) L Osterloh	1	5
Q	(United States) M Washington	6	6
(Ukraine) T Luzhanska	1	2
(Germany) L Siegemund	2	1
(Canada) H El Tabakh	6	6
(Georgia (country)) A Tatishvili	7^{7}	6
4	(Canada) V Tétreault	6^{2}	1
6	(United States) L Albanese	6^{2}	6	5
JE	(Thailand) N Lertcheewakarn	7^{7}	3	7
Q	(United States) C McHale	2	6	1
(Russia) O Puchkova	6	0	6
(United States) M Moulton-Levy	6	3	4
(Israel) J Glushko	3	6	6
(United States) A Rolle	6	2	6^{7}
2	(Canada) S Dubois	4	6	7^{9}

Second round
5	(Australia) S Ferguson	6^{7}	4
Q	(United States) M Washington	7^{9}	6
(Canada) H El Tabakh	4	6	6
(Georgia (country)) A Tatishvili	6	3	4
JE	(Thailand) N Lertcheewakarn	3	6	6
(Russia) O Puchkova	6	2	4
(Israel) J Glushko	1	2
2	(Canada) S Dubois	6	6

Quarterfinals
Q	(United States) M Washington	6	6
(Canada) H El Tabakh	4	3
JE	(Thailand) N Lertcheewakarn	1	0
2	(Canada) S Dubois	6	6

Semifinals
Q	(United States) M Washington	2	6	3
2	(Canada) S Dubois	6	4	6
