= 2008 Odlum Brown Vancouver Open – Men's singles =

Men's singles
- 2008 Odlum Brown Vancouver Open

Final
- Champion: (Israel) Dudi Sela
- Runner-up: (United States) Kevin Kim
- Score: 6–3, 6–0

Events
Singles	men	women
Doubles	men	women
← 2007 ·	Vancouver Open	· 2009 →

Frédéric Niemeyer was the defending champion, but lost in second round to Peter Polansky.

Dudi Sela won the title by defeating Kevin Kim 6–3, 6–0 in the final.

== Seeds ==
1. (Chinese Taipei) Lu Yen-hsun (second round, retired due to a right hamstring injury)
2. (United States) Bobby Reynolds (semifinals)
3. (Israel) Dudi Sela (champion)
4. (Colombia) Alejandro Falla (first round)
5. (United States) Robert Kendrick (second round)
6. (Japan) Go Soeda (semifinals)
7. (Denmark) Kristian Pless (second round)
8. (United States) Sam Warburg (first round)

== Draw ==
=== Key ===
- Q = Qualifier
- WC = Wild card
- LL = Lucky loser
- Alt = Alternate
- SE = Special exempt
- PR = Protected ranking
- ITF = ITF entry
- JE = Junior exempt
- w/o = Walkover
- r = Retired
- d = Defaulted
- SR = Special ranking

=== Finals ===
Semifinals
6	(Japan) Go Soeda	4	4
3	(Israel) Dudi Sela	6	6
(United States) Kevin Kim	6	6
2	(United States) Bobby Reynolds	4	2

Final
3	(Israel) Dudi Sela	6	6
(United States) Kevin Kim	3	0

=== Top half ===
First round
1	(Chinese Taipei) Y-h Lu	7^{7}	6
WC	(United States) N Monroe	6^{5}	3
LL	(Philippines) C Mamiit	4	6	6^{4}
SE	(India) S Devvarman	6	2	7^{7}
Q	(South Korea) K-t Im	7	6^{3}	6
(United States) S Jenkins	5	7^{7}	3
(Israel) H Levy	7	1	1
6	(Japan) G Soeda	5	6	6
3	(Israel) D Sela	4	7^{7}	6
(Kazakhstan) A Golubev	6	6^{4}	1
(France) G Lugassy	1	4
Q	(Paraguay) R Delgado	6	6
(United Kingdom) A Bogdanovic	6	6
(United States) B Evans	1	4
(South Africa) R de Voest	5	3
5	(United States) R Kendrick	7	6

Second round
1	(Chinese Taipei) Y-h Lu	0^{r}
SE	(India) S Devvarman	0
Q	(South Korea) K-t Im	3	6	2
6	(Japan) G Soeda	6	3	6
3	(Israel) D Sela	7^{7}	6
Q	(Paraguay) R Delgado	6^{4}	4
(United Kingdom) A Bogdanovic	7^{7}	6^{4}	6
5	(United States) R Kendrick	6^{2}	7^{7}	4

Quarterfinals
SE	(India) S Devvarman	4	6^{6}
6	(Japan) G Soeda	6	7^{8}
3	(Israel) D Sela	6	6
(United Kingdom) A Bogdanovic	4	3

Semifinals
6	(Japan) G Soeda	4	4
3	(Israel) D Sela	6	6

=== Bottom half ===
First round
7	(Denmark) K Pless	6	7^{7}
WC	(United States) M McClune	3	6^{1}
(United States) K Kim	6	6
(Russia) A Kudryavtsev	1	3
WC	(Canada) P Bester	6^{4}	6	6^{5}
(Canada) F Niemeyer	7^{7}	0	7^{7}
WC	(Canada) P Polansky	6	6
4	(Colombia) A Falla	4	4
8	(United States) S Warburg	6^{8}	1
(United States) A Bogomolov Jr.	7^{10}	6
(Thailand) D Udomchoke	6	3	4
(Australia) C Ball	4	6	6
Q	(Israel) N Okun	3	6	6
Q	(United States) P Simmonds	6	4	2
(United States) A Delić	6	4	2
2	(United States) B Reynolds	3	6	6

Second round
7	(Denmark) K Pless	0	3
(United States) K Kim	6	6
(Canada) F Niemeyer	6	3	4
WC	(Canada) P Polansky	4	6	6
(United States) A Bogomolov Jr.	6	6
(Australia) C Ball	4	4
Q	(Israel) N Okun	2	4
2	(United States) B Reynolds	6	6

Quarterfinals
(United States) K Kim	6	6
WC	(Canada) P Polansky	4	1
(United States) A Bogomolov Jr.	7	4	3
2	(United States) B Reynolds	5	6	6

Semifinals
(United States) K Kim	6	6
2	(United States) B Reynolds	4	2
