= 2009 Sony Ericsson Open – Men's doubles =

Men's doubles
- 2009 Sony Ericsson Open

Final
- Champion: (Belarus) Max Mirnyi (Israel) Andy Ram
- Runner-up: (Australia) Ashley Fisher (Australia) Stephen Huss
- Score: 6–7^{(4–7)}, 6–2, [10–7]

Events
| Singles | men | women |
| Doubles | men | women |
| ← 2008 · | Sony Ericsson Open | · 2010 → |

Bob Bryan and Mike Bryan are the defending champions. However, they lost to Ashley Fisher and Stephen Huss in the semifinals.

== Seeds ==
1. (United States) Bob Bryan / (United States) Mike Bryan (semifinals)
2. (Canada) Daniel Nestor / (Serbia) Nenad Zimonjić (first round)
3. (India) Mahesh Bhupathi / (The Bahamas) Mark Knowles (first round)
4. (Czech Republic) Lukáš Dlouhý / (India) Leander Paes (second round)
5. (Poland) Mariusz Fyrstenberg / (Poland) Marcin Matkowski (first round)
6. (Brazil) Bruno Soares / (Zimbabwe) Kevin Ullyett (quarterfinals)
7. (South Africa) Jeff Coetzee / (South Africa) Wesley Moodie (second round)
8. (Brazil) Marcelo Melo / (Brazil) André Sá (first round)

== Draw ==
=== Key ===
- Q = Qualifier
- WC = Wild card
- LL = Lucky loser
- Alt = Alternate
- SE = Special exempt
- PR = Protected ranking
- ITF = ITF entry
- JE = Junior exempt
- w/o = Walkover
- r = Retired
- d = Defaulted
- SR = Special ranking

=== Finals ===
Semifinals
1 | (United States) Bob Bryan (United States) Mike Bryan | 6^{6} | 4
(Australia) Ashley Fisher (Australia) Stephen Huss | 7^{8} | 6
(Belarus) Max Mirnyi (Israel) Andy Ram | 4 | 7^{10} | [10]
(Austria) Julian Knowle (Austria) Jürgen Melzer | 6 | 6^{8} | [6]

Final
(Australia) Ashley Fisher (Australia) Stephen Huss | 7^{7} | 2 | [7]
(Belarus) Max Mirnyi (Israel) Andy Ram | 6^{4} | 6 | [10]

=== Top half ===
First round
1 | (United States) B Bryan (United States) M Bryan | 7^{7} | 7
(Germany) N Kiefer (Germany) R Schüttler | 6^{2} | 5
(Serbia) N Djokovic (Argentina) L Arnold Ker | 6 | 6^{6} | [4]
(Croatia) I Karlović (Serbia) D Vemić | 4 | 7^{8} | [10]
WC | (Spain) M López (Spain) R Nadal | 6 | 7^{7}
ALT | (Sweden) J Brunström (Netherlands Antilles) J-J Rojer | 2 | 6^{5}
WC | (Argentina) G Gaudio (Ecuador) N Lapentti | 2 | 2
6 | (Brazil) B Soares (Zimbabwe) K Ullyett | 6 | 6
4 | (Czech Republic) L Dlouhý (India) L Paes | 6 | 6
(Chile) F González (Argentina) J Mónaco | 2 | 2
(Czech Republic) F Čermák (Slovakia) M Mertiňák | 6 | 6
(France) J Chardy (France) G Simon | 3 | 4
(Australia) A Fisher (Australia) S Huss | 6 | 6
(France) P-H Mathieu (Russia) M Safin | 4 | 2
(United States) T Parrott (Slovakia) F Polášek | 6 | 6
5 | (Poland) M Fyrstenberg (Poland) M Matkowski | 4 | 1

Second round
1 | (United States) B Bryan (United States) M Bryan | 4 | 7^{7} | [10]
(Croatia) I Karlović (Serbia) D Vemić | 6 | 6^{5} | [8]
WC | (Spain) M López (Spain) R Nadal | 3 | 4
6 | (Brazil) B Soares (Zimbabwe) K Ullyett | 6 | 6
4 | (Czech Republic) L Dlouhý (India) L Paes | 3 | 3
(Czech Republic) F Čermák (Slovakia) M Mertiňák | 6 | 6
(Australia) A Fisher (Australia) S Huss | 7^{7} | 7^{7}
(United States) T Parrott (Slovakia) F Polášek | 6^{3} | 6^{4}

Quarterfinals
1 | (United States) B Bryan (United States) M Bryan | 7^{7} | 6
6 | (Brazil) B Soares (Zimbabwe) K Ullyett | 6^{1} | 4
(Czech Republic) F Čermák (Slovakia) M Mertiňák | 4 | 6 | [6]
(Australia) A Fisher (Australia) S Huss | 6 | 3 | [10]

Semifinals
1 | (United States) B Bryan (United States) M Bryan | 6^{6} | 4
(Australia) A Fisher (Australia) S Huss | 7^{8} | 6

=== Bottom half ===
First round
7 | (South Africa) J Coetzee (South Africa) W Moodie | 6 | 6
(United States) J Cerretani (Romania) V Hănescu | 3 | 3
(Italy) S Bolelli (Italy) A Seppi | 1 | 2
(Belarus) M Mirnyi (Israel) A Ram | 6 | 6
(South Africa) R de Voest (United States) B Reynolds | 6 | 7^{7}
(Sweden) S Aspelin (United Kingdom) J Murray | 1 | 6^{4}
(France) J Benneteau (France) J-W Tsonga | 3 | 7 | [10]
3 | (India) M Bhupathi (The Bahamas) M Knowles | 6 | 5 | [6]
8 | (Brazil) M Melo (Brazil) A Sá | 6^{5} | 1
(United Kingdom) R Hutchins (Australia) J Kerr | 7^{7} | 6
(Czech Republic) M Damm (Sweden) M Lindstedt | 7 | 6
(Germany) C Kas (Germany) P Kohlschreiber | 5 | 3
(Russia) I Kunitsyn (Russia) D Tursunov | 4 | 2
(Austria) J Knowle (Austria) J Melzer | 6 | 6
(Spain) N Almagro (Spain) D Ferrer | 6 | 6
2 | (Canada) D Nestor (Serbia) N Zimonjić | 4 | 3

Second round
7 | (South Africa) J Coetzee (South Africa) W Moodie | 6^{4} | 6 | [8]
(Belarus) M Mirnyi (Israel) A Ram | 7^{7} | 3 | [10]
(South Africa) R de Voest (United States) B Reynolds | 6^{4} | 4
(France) J Benneteau (France) J-W Tsonga | 7^{7} | 6
(United Kingdom) R Hutchins (Australia) J Kerr | 6 | 6
(Czech Republic) M Damm (Sweden) M Lindstedt | 3 | 3
(Austria) J Knowle (Austria) J Melzer | 6 | 7^{9}
(Spain) N Almagro (Spain) D Ferrer | 0 | 6^{7}

Quarterfinals
(Belarus) M Mirnyi (Israel) A Ram | 7^{7} | 7^{7}
(France) J Benneteau (France) J-W Tsonga | 6^{1} | 6^{5}
(United Kingdom) R Hutchins (Australia) J Kerr | 3 | 1
(Austria) J Knowle (Austria) J Melzer | 6 | 6

Semifinals
(Belarus) M Mirnyi (Israel) A Ram | 4 | 7^{10} | [10]
(Austria) J Knowle (Austria) J Melzer | 6 | 6^{8} | [6]
