= 2009 Odlum Brown Vancouver Open – Men's singles =

Men's singles
- 2009 Odlum Brown Vancouver Open

Final
- Champion: (Cyprus) Marcos Baghdatis
- Runner-up: (Belgium) Xavier Malisse
- Score: 6–4, 6–4

Events
Singles	men	women
Doubles	men	women
← 2008 ·	Vancouver Open	· 2010 →

Dudi Sela was the defending champion. He didn't compete this year.
Marcos Baghdatis defeated Xavier Malisse 6–4, 6–4 in the final.

== Seeds ==
1. (United States) Rajeev Ram (first round)
2. (Germany) Michael Berrer (first round)
3. (Cyprus) Marcos Baghdatis (champion)
4. (Israel) Harel Levy (first round)
5. (United States) Ryan Sweeting (second round)
6. (South Africa) Kevin Anderson (first round)
7. (Switzerland) Marco Chiudinelli (second round)
8. (Australia) Marinko Matosevic (second round)

== Draw ==
=== Key ===
- Q = Qualifier
- WC = Wild card
- LL = Lucky loser
- Alt = Alternate
- SE = Special exempt
- PR = Protected ranking
- ITF = ITF entry
- JE = Junior exempt
- w/o = Walkover
- r = Retired
- d = Defaulted
- SR = Special ranking

=== Finals ===
Semifinals
(United Kingdom) Alex Bogdanovic	6	4	3
3	(Cyprus) Marcos Baghdatis	3	6	6
Q	(United States) Tim Smyczek	2	6	2
(Belgium) Xavier Malisse	6	3	6

Final
3	(Cyprus) Marcos Baghdatis	6	6
(Belgium) Xavier Malisse	4	4

=== Top half ===
First round
1	(United States) R Ram	6^{4}	4
(United States) S Jenkins	7	6
(United Kingdom) A Bogdanovic	6	5	7
Q	(Netherlands) I Sijsling	2	7	5
ALT	(United States) A Kuznetsov	4	4
(Ukraine) S Bubka	6	6
(United States) M Yani	7	4	6^{2}
8	(Australia) M Matosevic	6^{4}	6	7
3	(Cyprus) M Baghdatis	6	6
WC	(United States) D Britton	4	2
(India) P Amritraj	7	6
(Croatia) I Dodig	5	3
WC	(Canada) P Bester	6	4	6
Q	(United States) K Van't Hof	4	6	2
(Italy) A Stoppini	4	3
5	(United States) R Sweeting	6	6

Second round
(United States) S Jenkins	6	6^{14}	4
(United Kingdom) A Bogdanovic	3	7	6
(Ukraine) S Bubka	7	3	7
8	(Australia) M Matosevic	5	6	6^{5}
3	(Cyprus) M Baghdatis	6	6
(India) P Amritraj	4	1
WC	(Canada) P Bester	1	6	6
5	(United States) R Sweeting	6	3	4

Quarterfinals
(United Kingdom) A Bogdanovic	6	6
(Ukraine) S Bubka	4	3
3	(Cyprus) M Baghdatis	6	5	7
WC	(Canada) P Bester	3	7	5

Semifinals
(United Kingdom) A Bogdanovic	6	4	3
3	(Cyprus) M Baghdatis	3	6	6

=== Bottom half ===
First round
7	(Switzerland) M Chiudinelli	6	7
ALT	(Australia) N Lindahl	2	5
(Australia) C Ball	4	5
Q	(United States) L Cook	6	7
(South Korea) K-t Im	3	6	6
(South Africa) R de Voest	6	4	3
Q	(United States) T Smyczek	1	6	6
4	(Israel) H Levy	6	4	2
6/SE	(South Africa) K Anderson	3	6	4
(Canada) P-L Duclos	6	4	6
(Belgium) X Malisse	7	6
(Canada) P Polansky	5	2
WC	(United States) T Dent	3	6	6
(United States) R DeHeart	6	3	3
WC	(United States) R Harrison	7	6
2	(Germany) M Berrer	5	2

Second round
7	(Switzerland) M Chiudinelli	5	6	5
Q	(United States) L Cook	7	1	7
(South Korea) K-t Im	0	1
Q	(United States) T Smyczek	6	6
(Canada) P-L Duclos	6	0	4
(Belgium) X Malisse	3	6	6
WC	(United States) T Dent	6	6
WC	(United States) R Harrison	3	3

Quarterfinals
Q	(United States) L Cook	6	2	6^{3}
Q	(United States) T Smyczek	3	6	7
(Belgium) X Malisse	6	6
WC	(United States) T Dent	3	3

Semifinals
Q	(United States) T Smyczek	2	6	2
(Belgium) X Malisse	6	3	6
