= Open Isla de Lanzarote =

Defunct tennis tournament
- Founded: 2006
- Abolished: 2008
- Editions: 3
- Location: Puerto del Carmen, Lanzarote, Spain
- Category: ATP Challenger Series
- Surface: Hard / Outdoors
- Draw: 32S/16Q/16D
- Website: Official website

The Open Isla de Lanzarote was a tennis tournament held in Puerto del Carmen, Lanzarote, Spain, between 2006 and 2008. The event was part of the challenger series and was played on outdoor hard courts. After 2008, the tournament was cancelled in favour of the Open Costa Adeje – Isla de Tenerife-Tournament.

== Past finals ==
=== Singles ===
Year	Champion	Runner-up	Score	Ref.
2006	(Sweden) Filip Prpic	(France) Jo-Wilfried Tsonga	3-6, 6-3, 6-4	
2007	(France) Jo-Wilfried Tsonga	(Australia) Paul Baccanello	6-2, 6-2	
2008	(Switzerland) Stéphane Bohli	(Taiwan) Yen-Hsun Lu	6-3, 6-4	

=== Doubles ===
Year	Champion	Runner-up	Score
2006	(France) Gregory Carraz (France) Jean-Michel Pequery	(Germany) Benedikt Dorsch (Netherlands) Steven Korteling	6-3, 7-5
2007	(Australia) Luke Bourgeois (South Africa) Rik de Voest	(Israel) Noam Okun (Israel) Dudi Sela	6-3, 6-1
2008	(South Africa) Rik de Voest (Poland) Łukasz Kubot	(Luxembourg) Gilles Müller (Pakistan) Aisam-ul-Haq Qureshi	6-2, 7-6
