= Ashley Fisher =

Australian tennis player

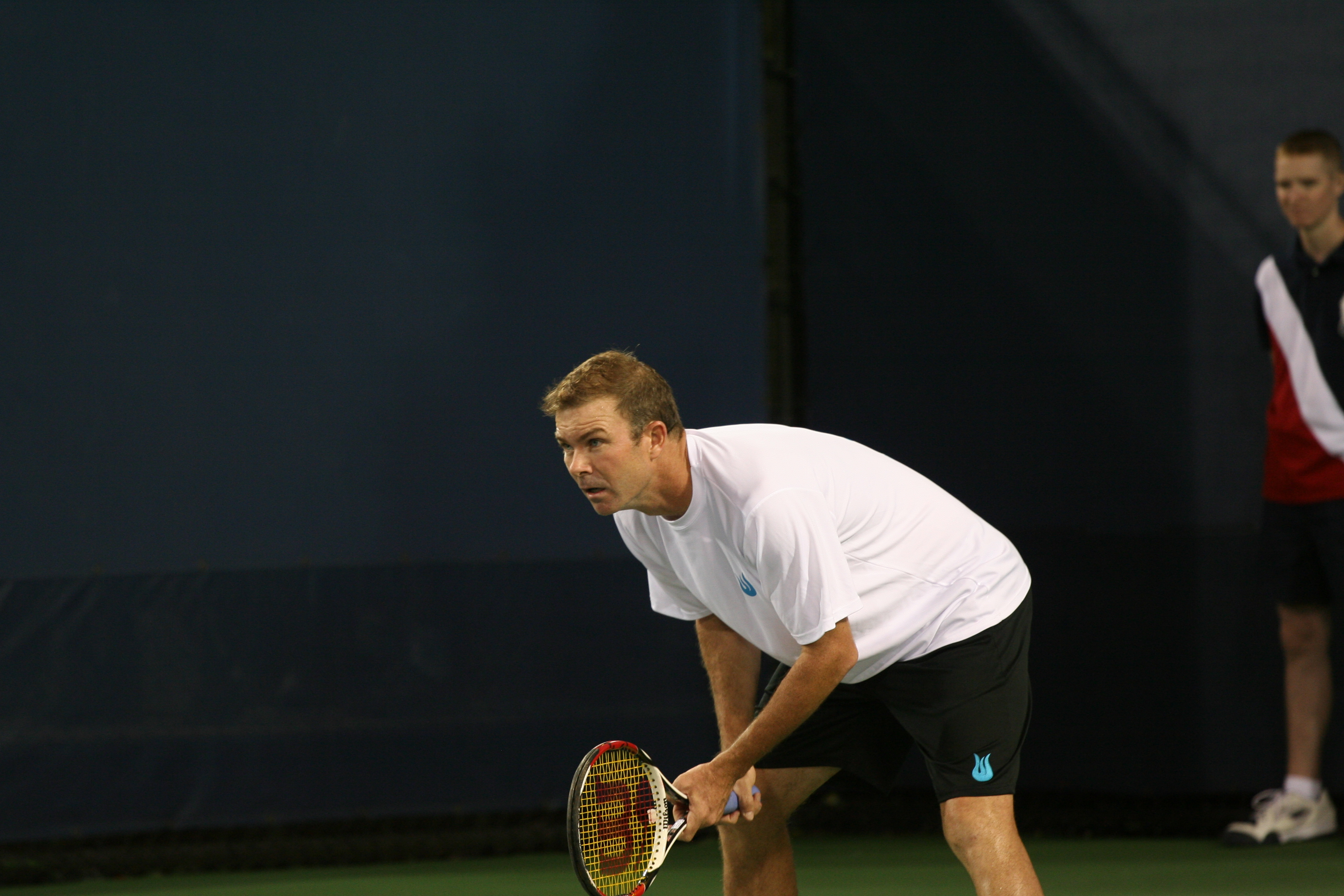
- Country (sports): Australia
- Residence: St Petersburg, Florida
- Born: 25 September 1975 (age 50) Wollongong, New South Wales, Australia
- Height: 1.83 m (6 ft 0 in)
- Turned pro: 1998
- Retired: 17 October 2011
- Plays: Right-handed (one-handed backhand)
- Prize money: $871,805

Singles
- Career record: 0–0
- Career titles: 0
- Highest ranking: No. 489 (24 July 2000)

Grand Slam singles results
- Australian Open: Q1 (2000)

Doubles
- Career record: 139–166
- Career titles: 4
- Highest ranking: No. 19 (22 June 2009)

Grand Slam doubles results
- Australian Open: QF (2006)
- French Open: 3R (2009, 2011)
- Wimbledon: QF (2004)
- US Open: SF (2006)

Grand Slam mixed doubles results
- Australian Open: 2R (2007)
- French Open: 2R (2009)
- Wimbledon: 2R (2001, 2005, 2006, 2011, 2012)
- US Open: 1R (2007, 2009)
- Last updated on: 30 April 2021.

Ashley Fisher (born 25 September 1975) is a former professional tennis player who comes from New South Wales in Australia. Fisher turned professional in 1998. Fisher has never played a major singles match on the ATP Tour, but has won four notable doubles titles on tour. The doubles specialist reached his highest doubles ranking of World Number 19 on 22 June 2009. He has reached the 2006 U.S. Open men's doubles semi-finals. Fisher is currently the head coach of the University of South Florida men's tennis team.

== Career ==
Before turning professional, Fisher played college tennis at Texas Christian University in Fort Worth, Texas, where he was a two time All-American for the Horned Frogs.

Fisher also reached the 2006 U.S. Open men's doubles semifinals alongside Tripp Phillips, where they lost to Jonas Björkman and Max Mirnyi, 6–1, 6–4. Fisher and Nikolay Davydenko were Wimbledon men's doubles quarterfinalists in 2004, where they lost to Jonas Björkman and Todd Woodbridge. He has won a total of 26 doubles titles, with 23 minor league Challengers and Futures events on the International Tennis Federation.

Fisher won his first ATP doubles title in Amersfoort with Devin Bowen, where they defeated Chris Haggard and André Sá 6–0, 6–4. His other two ATP titles were with different partners.

== Personal ==
Fisher was born to mother Pamela and father Gary, and has two older siblings. Fisher started playing tennis at age five.

He currently resides in St. Petersburg, Florida and is coached by Glenn Irwin.

In July 2016, Fisher was promoted to head coach for the Division 1 nationally ranked University of South Florida Bulls Men's Tennis Team replacing Matt Hill.

== ATP career finals ==
=== Doubles: 11 (4 titles, 7 runners-up) ===
Winner – Legend Grand Slam tournaments (0–0) ATP World Tour Finals (0–0) ATP World Tour Masters 1000 (0–1) ATP World Tour 500 Series (1–0) ATP World Tour 250 Series (3–6)	Finals by surface Hard (3–4) Clay (1–2) Grass (0–0) Carpet (0–1)

Result	W–L	Date	Tournament	Tier	Surface	Partner	Opponents	Score
Loss	0–1	Apr 2003	Grand Prix Hassan II, Morocco	250 Series	Clay	(United States) Devin Bowen	(Czech Republic) František Čermák (Czech Republic) Leoš Friedl	3–6, 5–7
Win	1–1	Jul 2003	Dutch Open, Netherlands	250 Series	Clay	(United States) Devin Bowen	(South Africa) Chris Haggard (Brazil) André Sá	6–0, 6–4
Loss	1–2	Oct 2005	Kingfisher Open, Vietnam	250 Series	Carpet	(Sweden) Robert Lindstedt	(Germany) Lars Burgsmüller (Germany) Philipp Kohlschreiber	6–7^{(3–7)}, 4–6, 2–6
Win	2–2	Oct 2006	Japan Open, Japan	500 Series	Hard	(United States) Tripp Phillips	(United States) Paul Goldstein (United States) Jim Thomas	6–2, 7–5
Win	3–2	Sep 2007	China Open, China	250 Series	Hard	(South Africa) Rik de Voest	(South Africa) Chris Haggard (Chinese Taipei) Yen-Hsun Lu	6–7^{(3–7)}, 6–0, [10–6]
Win	4–2	Jul 2008	Indianapolis, United States	250 Series	Hard	(United States) Tripp Phillips	(United States) Scott Lipsky (United States) David Martin	3–6, 6–3, [10–5]
Loss	4–3	Sep 2008	China Open, China	250 Series	Hard	(United States) Bobby Reynolds	(United Kingdom) Ross Hutchins (Australia) Stephen Huss	5–7, 4–6
Loss	4–4	Feb 2009	SA Open, South Africa	250 Series	Hard	(South Africa) Rik de Voest	(United States) James Cerretani (Belgium) Dick Norman	7–6^{(7–9)}, 2–6, [12–14]
Loss	4–5	Apr 2009	Miami Open, United States	Masters 1000	Hard	(Australia) Stephen Huss	(Belarus) Max Mirnyi (Israel) Andy Ram	6–2, 7–5
Loss	4–6	May 2009	BMW Open, Germany	250 Series	Clay	(Australia) Jordan Kerr	(Czech Republic) Jan Hernych (Czech Republic) Ivo Minář	4–6, 4–6
Loss	4–7	Jul 2009	Indianapolis, United States	250 Series	Hard	(Australia) Jordan Kerr	(Russia) Dmitry Tursunov (Latvia) Ernests Gulbis	4–6, 6–3, [9–11]

== ATP Challenger and ITF Futures finals ==
=== Doubles: 42 (27–15) ===
Legend ATP Challenger (20–9) ITF Futures (7–6)	Finals by surface Hard (20–5) Clay (7–7) Grass (0–0) Carpet (0–3)

Result	W–L	Date	Tournament	Tier	Surface	Partner	Opponents	Score
Loss	0–1	May 1998	USA F2, Vero Beach	Futures	Clay	(India) Nitten Kirrtane	(Sweden) Simon Aspelin (United States) Chris Tontz	3–6, 4–6
Loss	0–2	Oct 1998	Finland F4, Oulu	Futures	Carpet	(Australia) Ashley Ford	(Sweden) Robert Samuelsson (Sweden) Robert Lindstedt	3–6, 4–6
Win	1–2	Jul 1999	Spain F2, Alicante	Futures	Clay	(Mexico) Enrique Abaroa	(Australia) Todd Perry (Australia) Tim Crichton	6–4, 2–6, 7–6
Loss	1–3	Oct 1999	Indonesia F6, Jakarta	Futures	Hard	(United States) Minh Le	(South Africa) Myles Wakefield (Japan) Thomas Shimada	3–6, 6–7
Win	2–3	Nov 1999	Thailand F2, Pattaya City	Futures	Hard	(Canada) Dave Abelson	(Germany) Björn Jacob (Poland) Bartlomiej Dabrowski	6–4 ret.
Win	3–3	Nov 1999	Bangladesh F1, Rajshahi	Futures	Hard	(United States) Minh Le	(Indonesia) Febi Widmhiyanto (Indonesia) Hendri-Susilo Pramono	6–3, 6–0
Win	4–3	Dec 1999	Bangladesh F2, Dhaka	Futures	Hard	(United States) Minh Le	(South Africa) Rik de Voest (South Africa) Willem-Petrus Meyer	6–2, 6–4
Loss	4–4	Apr 2000	France F8, Melun	Futures	Carpet	(Cuba) José Frontera	(Germany) Andreas Tattermusch (Germany) Andreas Weber	6–7^{(6–8)}, 6–4, 6–7^{(3–7)}
Win	5–4	May 2000	Austria F1, Salzburg	Futures	Clay	(Australia) Tim Crichton	(Netherlands) Djalmar Sistermans (Poland) Bartlomiej Dabrowski	6–7^{(10–8)}, 6–3, 6–3
Loss	5–5	Jul 2000	Montauban, France	Challenger	Clay	(Australia) Tim Crichton	(Australia) Lee Pearson (Australia) Grant Silcock	1–6, 4–6
Win	6–5	Jul 2000	Ostend, Belgium	Challenger	Clay	(Australia) Tim Crichton	(Argentina) Damián Furmanski (Argentina) Francisco Cabello	6–2, 2–6, 6–1
Win	7–5	Aug 2000	Segovia, Spain	Challenger	Hard	(South Africa) Jason Weir-Smith	(South Africa) Damien Roberts (Australia) Jordan Kerr	7–6^{(7–5)}, 6–1
Loss	7–6	Aug 2000	Sylt, Germany	Challenger	Clay	(South Africa) Gareth Williams	(Romania) Ionuț Moldovan (Russia) Yuriy Schukin	4–6, 2–6
Win	8–6	Oct 2000	Austin, United States	Challenger	Hard	(Australia) Tim Crichton	(Netherlands) Raemon Sluiter (Netherlands) Dennis Van Scheppingen	6–1, 6–7^{(6–8)}, 6–0
Loss	8–7	Nov 2000	Yokohama, Japan	Challenger	Carpet	(Australia) Tim Crichton	(Switzerland) Yves Allegro (Austria) Julian Knowle	3–6, 6–7^{(2–7)}
Win	9–7	Nov 2000	Seoul, South Korea	Challenger	Hard	(Australia) Tim Crichton	(Czech Republic) František Čermák (Czech Republic) Ota Fukárek	6–4, 6–4
Win	10–7	Nov 2000	Vietnam F1, Ho Chi Minh City	Futures	Hard	(Pakistan) Aisam Qureshi	(Czech Republic) Michal Navrátil (Czech Republic) Jaroslav Levinský	6–4, 6–4
Win	11–7	Mar 2001	Singapore, Singapore	Challenger	Hard	(Australia) Tim Crichton	(United States) Brandon Hawk (United Kingdom) Kyle Spencer	3–6, 6–3, 6–4
Win	12–7	Sep 2001	Curitiba, Brazil	Challenger	Clay	(Australia) Tim Crichton	(Portugal) Pedro Pereira (Portugal) Emanuel Couto	6–3, 6–4
Loss	12–8	Apr 2002	Tunis, Tunisia	Challenger	Clay	(United States) Devin Bowen	(Spain) Álex López Morón (Argentina) Andrés Schneiter	4–6, 6–7^{(6–8)}
Loss	12–9	Jun 2002	Biella, Italy	Challenger	Clay	(Australia) Nathan Healey	(Slovakia) Dominik Hrbatý (Italy) Giorgio Galimberti	6–3, 3–6, 5–7
Win	13–9	Nov 2002	Nottingham, United Kington	Challenger	Hard	(Australia) Stephen Huss	(United States) Scott Humphries (The Bahamas) Mark Merklein	6–3, 7–6^{(7–5)}
Loss	13–10	Apr 2003	Bermuda Challenger, Bermuda	Challenger	Clay	(Australia) Andrew Kratzmann	(United States) Robert Kendrick (The Bahamas) Mark Merklein	3–6, 1–3 ret.
Win	14–10	Nov 2003	Waco, United States	Challenger	Hard	(United States) Devin Bowen	(United States) Ryan Havilland (United States) K.J. Hippensteel	6–4, 7–6^{(7–4)}
Win	15–10	Jan 2004	Nouméa, New Caledonia	Challenger	Hard	(Australia) Stephen Huss	(Australia) Luke Bourgeois (Australia) Vince Mellino	3–6, 6–4, 6–4
Win	16–10	Mar 2004	Mexico City, Mexico	Challenger	Clay	(United States) Tripp Phillips	(Netherlands) Rogier Wassen (Argentina) Federico Browne	6–4, 2–6, 6–3
Loss	16–11	Apr 2004	Bermuda Challenger, Bermuda	Challenger	Clay	(Australia) Stephen Huss	(Australia) Jordan Kerr (Belgium) Tom Vanhoudt	6–4, 3–6, 6–7^{(6–8)}
Win	17–11	Sep 2004	Seoul, South Korea	Challenger	Hard	(Sweden) Robert Lindstedt	(Sweden) Johan Landsberg (Japan) Thomas Shimada	7–5, 7–6^{(7–0)}
Win	18–11	Sep 2004	Beijing, China	Challenger	Hard	(United States) Tripp Phillips	(United States) Justin Gimelstob (United States) Graydon Oliver	7–5, 7–5
Win	19–11	Aug 2005	Vancouver, Canada	Challenger	Hard	(United States) Tripp Phillips	(United States) Huntley Montgomery (United States) Rajeev Ram	7–6^{(8–6)}, 1–6, 6–2
Win	20–11	Nov 2005	Busan 2, South Korea	Challenger	Hard	(United States) Tripp Phillips	(Thailand) Sanchai Ratiwatana (Thailand) Sonchat Ratiwatana	7–5, 6–3
Win	21–11	Nov 2005	Champaign-Urbana, United States	Challenger	Hard	(United States) Tripp Phillips	(United States) Justin Gimelstob (United States) Rajeev Ram	6–3, 5–7, 6–0
Win	22–11	Dec 2005	Orlando, United States	Challenger	Hard	(United States) Tripp Phillips	(Germany) Mischa Zverev (United States) Alex Kuznetsov	default
Win	23–11	Aug 2007	Vancouver, Cabada	Challenger	Hard	(South Africa) Rik de Voest	(United States) Alex Kuznetsov (United States) Donald Young	6–1, 6–2
Loss	23–12	Nov 2007	Nashville, United States	Challenger	Hard	(Australia) Stephen Huss	(United States) Bobby Reynolds (United States) Rajeev Ram	7–6^{(7–4)}, 1–6, [10–12]
Loss	23–13	Aug 2008	Vancouver, Canada	Challenger	Hard	(South Africa) Rik de Voest	(United States) Travis Parrott (United States) Eric Butorac	4–6, 6–7^{(3–7)}
Win	24–13	Sep 2008	Tulsa, United States	Challenger	Hard	(Australia) Stephen Huss	(United States) Bobby Reynolds (United States) Rajeev Ram	7–6^{(7–4)}, 6–3
Win	25–13	Nov 2008	Busan 2, South Korea	Challenger	Hard	(South Africa) Rik de Voest	(Netherlands Antilles) Jean-Julien Rojer (Sweden) Johan Brunström	6–4, 2–6, [10–6]
Win	26–13	May 2011	Sarasota, United States	Challenger	Clay	(Australia) Stephen Huss	(United States) Alex Kuznetsov (United States) Alex Bogomolov Jr.	6–3, 6–4
Win	27–13	May 2011	USA F12, Tampa	Futures	Clay	(South Africa) Chris Haggard	(Brazil) Clayton Almeida (United States) Joshua Zavala]	7–6^{(7–1)}, 6–4
Loss	27–14	Oct 2015	USA F29, Mansfield	Futures	Hard	(United Kingdom) Liam Broady	(Mexico) Hans Hach (United States) Eric Quigley	5–7, 3–6
Loss	27–15	Nov 2015	Australia F11, Wollongong	Futures	Hard	(United Kingdom) Dayne Kelly	(Australia) Marc Polmans (Australia) Steven de Waard	2–6, 6–4, [7–10]

== Grand Slam performance timelines ==
Key
W	F	SF	QF	#R	RR	Q#	DNQ	A	NH

(W) winner; (F) finalist; (SF) semifinalist; (QF) quarterfinalist; (#R) rounds 4, 3, 2, 1; (RR) round-robin stage; (Q#) qualification round; (DNQ) did not qualify; (A) absent; (NH) not held; (SR) strike rate (events won / competed); (W–L) win–loss record.

=== Doubles ===
Tournament	1998	1999	2000	2001	2002	2003	2004	2005	2006	2007	2008	2009	2010	2011	2012	SR	W-L
Australian Open	A	A	1R	1R	3R	3R	1R	3R	QF	2R	A	2R	A	1R	A	0 / 10	11–10
French Open	A	A	A	1R	1R	2R	1R	1R	1R	1R	1R	3R	A	3R	1R	0 / 11	5–11
Wimbledon	A	A	Q1	1R	1R	2R	QF	2R	3R	1R	2R	1R	A	3R	1R	0 / 11	10–11
US Open	A	A	Q2	Q1	1R	1R	2R	1R	SF	1R	3R	1R	A	1R	1R	0 / 10	7–10
Win–loss	0–0	0–0	0–1	0–3	2–4	4–4	4–4	3–4	9–4	1–4	3–3	3–4	0–0	4–4	0–3	0 / 41	33–41

=== Mixed doubles ===
Tournament	2001	2002	2003	2004	2005	2006	2007	2008	2009	2010	2011	2012	SR	W-L
Australian Open	A	A	A	A	A	A	2R	A	A	A	A	A	0 / 1	1–1
French Open	A	A	A	A	A	A	1R	A	2R	A	A	A	0 / 2	1–2
Wimbledon	2R	A	1R	A	2R	2R	1R	A	1R	A	2R	2R	0 / 8	5–8
US Open	A	A	A	A	A	A	1R	A	1R	A	A	A	0 / 2	0–2
Win–loss	1–1	0–0	0–1	0–0	1–1	1–1	1–4	0–0	1–3	0–0	1–1	1–1	0 / 13	7–13
