= Juan-Francisco Spina =

Argentine tennis player

- Country (sports): Argentina
- Born: 8 May 1985 (age 41)
- Prize money: $28,036

Singles
- Highest ranking: No. 738 (11 Jun 2007)

Doubles
- Career record: 0–1
- Highest ranking: No. 653 (28 Sep 2009)

Juan-Francisco Spina (born 8 May 1985) is an Argentine former professional tennis player.

Known as "Pancho", Spina comes from the city of La Plata and had a best singles world ranking of 738. His only ATP Tour main draw appearance came in doubles at the 2009 Indianapolis Championships with Marcos Baghdatis, whom he would coach on tour for several years. He won three ITF Futures doubles titles during his career.

== ITF Futures titles ==
=== Doubles: (3) ===
No.	Date	Tournament	Surface	Partner	Opponents	Score
1.	May 2005	Italy F14, Teramo	Clay	(Italy) Giuseppe Menga	(Australia) Yuri Bezeruk (United States) Kiantki Thomas	6–4, 7–6^{(5)}
2.	Sep 2006	Bolivia F3, Santa Cruz	Clay	(Argentina) Martín Alund	(Argentina) Cristhian Ignacio Benedetti (Argentina) Rodolfo Daruich	6–1, 5–7, 7–6^{(4)}
3.	Mar 2008	Italy F4, Caltanissetta	Clay	(Argentina) Juan-Martín Aranguren	(Serbia) Nikola Ćirić (Serbia) Miljan Zekić	W/O
