= Story Tweedie-Yates =

American tennis player

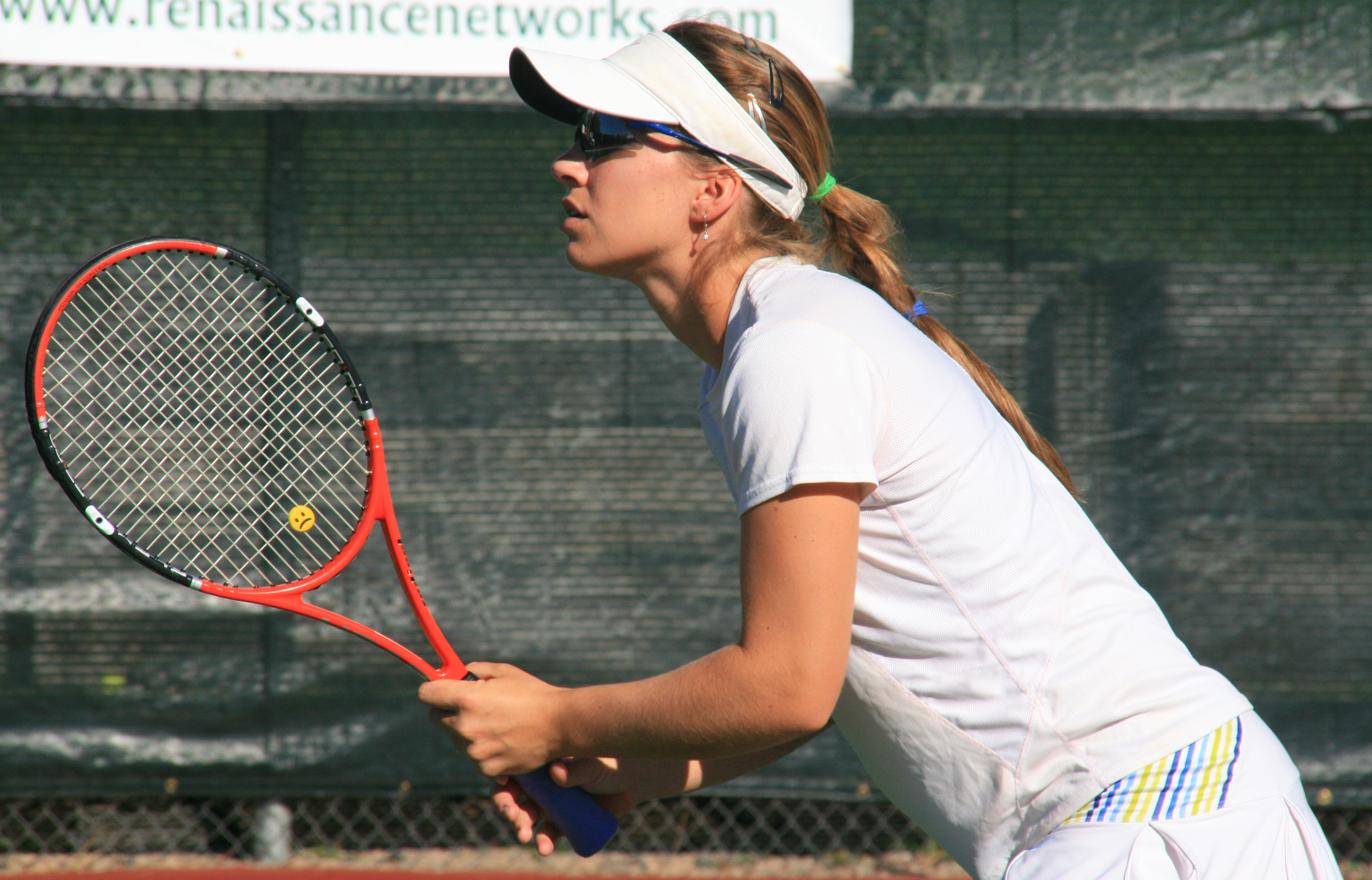
- 2008 in Albuquerque
- Country (sports): United States
- Born: May 2, 1983 (age 41)
- Height: 5 ft 7 in (1.70 m)
- Turned pro: 2004
- Retired: 2011
- Plays: Right (two-handed backhand)
- Prize money: $70,393

Singles
- Career record: 139–140
- Career titles: 2 ITF
- Highest ranking: No. 319 (October 30, 2006)

Doubles
- Career record: 97–95
- Career titles: 8 ITF
- Highest ranking: No. 189 (May 25, 2009)

Story Tweedie-Yates (born May 2, 1983) is an American former tennis player. Her career-high singles ranking is world No. 319, which she reached in October 2006. Her career-high doubles ranking is No. 189, set in May 2009.

== Early life ==
Tweedie-Yates, who grew up in Redmond, Washington, studied psychology at Stanford University from 2001 to 2005. She then focused on a career as a tennis player. Overall, she won two singles and eight doubles titles on the ITF Women's Circuit. In August 2011, she retired from professional tennis.

== ITF Circuit finals ==
$50,000 tournaments
$25,000 tournaments
$10,000 tournaments

=== Singles: 4 (2–2) ===
| Outcome | No. | Date | Tournament | Surface | Opponent | Score |
|---|---|---|---|---|---|---|
| Winner | 1. | 13 September 2004 | Matamoros, Mexico | Hard | (Mexico) Melissa Torres Sandoval | 3–6, 6–2, 6–3 |
| Runner-up | 1. | 14 June 2005 | Fort Worth, United States | Hard | (United States) Tara Snyder | 3–6, 3–6 |
| Runner-up | 2. | 27 June 2005 | Southlake, United States | Hard | (United States) Megan Bradley | 4–6, 2–6 |
| Winner | 2. | 4 September 2006 | Caracas, Venezuela | Hard | (Colombia) Mariana Duque Marino | 6–3, 6–3 |

=== Doubles: 15 (8–7) ===
| Outcome | No. | Date | Tournament | Surface | Partner | Opponents | Score |
|---|---|---|---|---|---|---|---|
| Runner-up | 1. | 12 September 2005 | Matamoros, Mexico | Hard | (Serbia) Ana Cetnik | (Mexico) Daniela Múñoz Gallegos (Colombia) Paula Zabala | 4–6, 4–6 |
| Runner-up | 2. | 25 June 2006 | Fort Worth, United States | Hard | (Argentina) Maria Victoria Domina | (United States) Christina Fusano (Australia) Nicole Kriz | 6–2, 4–6, 1–6 |
| Winner | 1. | 23 July 2006 | Hamilton, Canada | Clay | (Australia) Nicole Kriz | (Argentina) Soledad Esperón (Canada) Aleksandra Wozniak | 6–4, 6–1 |
| Winner | 2. | 6 August 2006 | Vancouver Open, Canada | Hard | (Australia) Nicole Kriz | (United States) Jennifer Magley (United States) Courtney Nagle | 7–5, 6–3 |
| Winner | 3. | 4 September 2006 | Caracas, Venezuela | Hard | (United States) Jodi Kenoyer | (Colombia) Karen Castiblanco (Venezuela) Mariana Muci | 6–1, 6–1 |
| Runner-up | 3. | 20 Mar 2007 | Coatzacoalcos, Mexico | Hard | (Latvia) Līga Dekmeijere | (South Africa) Chanelle Scheepers (United States) Robin Stephenson | 2–6, 2–6 |
| Runner-up | 4. | 11 June 2007 | Campobasso, Italy | Clay | (Australia) Christina Wheeler | (Argentina) María José Argeri (Brazil) Letícia Sobral | 5–7, 3–6 |
| Winner | 8. | 26 May 2008 | Carson Challenger, United States | Hard | (Indonesia) Romana Tedjakusuma | (United States) Kimberly Couts (Georgia (country)) Anna Tatishvili | 7–6^{(14–12)}, 4–6, [10–7] |
| Winner | 5. | 23 June 2008 | Getxo, Spain | Clay | (France) Julie Coin | (Spain) Estrella Cabeza Candela (Spain) Sara del Barrio Aragón | 6–3, 6–1 |
| Winner | 6. | 12 July 2008 | Valladolid, Spain | Hard | (Canada) Heidi El Tabakh | (Switzerland) Stefania Boffa (United Kingdom) Anna Fitzpatrick | 6–2, 6–4 |
| Runner-up | 5. | 19 January 2009 | Lutz, United States | Clay | (United States) Mashona Washington | (United States) Kimberly Couts (Canada) Sharon Fichman | 4–6, 5–7 |
| Winner | 7. | 13 April 2009 | Osprey, United States | Clay | (United States) Lindsay Lee-Waters | (Canada) Heidi El Tabakh (Austria) Melanie Klaffner | 6–3, 6–7^{(5–7)}, [12–10] |
| Runner-up | 6. | 15 June 2009 | Montpellier, France | Hard | (Switzerland) Stefania Boffa | (Ukraine) Yuliya Beygelzimer (Germany) Laura Siegemund | 4–6, 1–6 |
| Runner-up | 7. | 19 July 2010 | Lexington Challenger, United States | Hard | (United States) Jacqueline Cako | (Australia) Bojana Bobusic (United States) Christina Fusano | 4–6, 2–6 |
| Winner | 8. | 27 September 2010 | Amelia Island, United States | Clay | (United States) Elizabeth Lumpkin | (United States) Alexandra Haney (United States) Kendal Woodard | 7–5, 6–4 |
