= Vancouver Open =

Odlum Brown VanOpen
- 2026 Odlum Brown Vancouver Open

Tournament information
- Founded: 2002; 24 years ago
- Editions: 16th (men); 19th (women)
- Location: West Vancouver, British Columbia; Canada
- Venue: Hollyburn Country Club
- Surface: Hard – outdoors
- Website: Official website

Current champions (2026)
- Men's singles: (United States) J. J. Wolf
- Women's singles: (Australia) Taylah Preston
- Men's doubles: (United States) Nathaniel Lammons / (United States) Jackson Withrow
- Women's doubles: (United States) Caroline Dolehide / (Canada) Alexandra Vagramov
ATP Tour
- Category: ATP Challenger 125 (2022, 2026-)
- Draw: 32S (16Q) / 16D (0Q)
- Prize money: US$ 225,000
WTA Tour
- Category: WTA 125
- Draw: 32S (16Q) / 14D (0Q)
- Prize money: US$ 225,000

The Odlum Brown VanOpen (sponsored by Odlum Brown Limited) is a professional tennis tournament played on outdoor hardcourts. It is part of the ATP Challenger Tour 125 and the WTA Challenger Tour 125. It is held at the Hollyburn Country Club in West Vancouver, British Columbia, Canada.

The event was hosted continuously from 2002 to 2015, but returned in 2017 after a one-year hiatus. The 2020 and 2021 editions were cancelled due to the COVID-19 pandemic. The event returned for one edition in 2022 but remained on hiatus, until its second comeback in 2026, citing ongoing renovations at its host venue.

== History ==
The inaugural Odlum Brown VanOpen took place in the summer of 2002, in the Jericho Tennis Club, before it eventually moved to Hollyburn Country Club, in West Vancouver, for the 2005 edition. Started as a $25,000 ITF Women's Circuit event, the Van Open saw the victory of eventual world No. 1 Maria Sharapova over Laura Granville in 2002, and of then-Junior world No. 1 and French Open girls' singles champion Anna-Lena Grönefeld in 2003.

The following year, Tennis Canada and Tennis BC (tennis' governing body in British Columbia) joined to bring the event to the Women's Tennis Association (WTA) Tour as a $110,000 Tier V event. Czech qualifier, and eventual top-ten member Nicole Vaidišová won the singles final over 2002 runner-up Laura Granville, becoming, as World No. 180, the lowest-ranked player to win a tour title during the 2004 WTA Tour season, and at 15 years, 3 months, and 23 days, the sixth youngest player to win a professional title in tour history.

While the women's event returned to its $25k format in 2005, "to help develop some of the world's best Canadian junior girls", a $100k men's Challenger event was added to the tournament, with the United States Tennis Association (USTA) and the Association of Tennis Professionals (ATP Tour) joining Tennis Canada, Tennis BC and the ITF in the organisation of the Open. Israeli Dudi Sela won the inaugural men's singles event over Australian Paul Baccanello in straight sets, and American Ansley Cargill won the first of her two women's singles titles (2005, 2006).

The VanOpen continued to grow in the following editions, with the ITF event's prize money moving up to $50k in 2007, and $75k in 2009. Amongst the tournament's champions since 2005 have been, on the women's side, former junior world No. 1 Urszula Radwańska (2008 singles), Stéphanie Dubois (2007 doubles, 2009 singles), and on the men's side Rik de Voest (2006 singles, 2007 and 2009 doubles), Frédéric Niemeyer (2007 singles), Dudi Sela (2005, 2008 and 2010 singles), who claimed his second VanOpen title, and 2006 Australian Open runner-up Marcos Baghdatis (2009 singles), who won in Vancouver his first title since February 2007.

== Past finals ==
=== Men's singles ===
Year	Champion	Runner-up	Score
2026	(United States) J.J. Wolf	(Estonia) Mark Lajal	7–5, 6–1
2023–2025	Not held		
2022	(France) Constant Lestienne	(France) Arthur Rinderknech	6–0, 4–6, 6–3
2021	Tournament cancelled due to the COVID-19 pandemic		
2020	Tournament cancelled due to the COVID-19 pandemic		
2019	(Lithuania) Ričardas Berankis	(Chinese Taipei) Jason Jung	6–3, 5–7, 6–4
2018	(United Kingdom) Dan Evans	(Australia) Jason Kubler	4–6, 7–5, 7–6^{(7–3)}
2017	(Germany) Cedrik-Marcel Stebe	(Australia) Jordan Thompson	6–0, 6–1
2016	Not held		
2015	(Israel) Dudi Sela (4)	(Australia) John-Patrick Smith	6–4, 7–5
2014	(Cyprus) Marcos Baghdatis (2)	(Uzbekistan) Farrukh Dustov	7–6^{(8–6)}, 6–3
2013	(Canada) Vasek Pospisil	(United Kingdom) Daniel Evans	6–0, 1–6, 7–5
2012	(Netherlands) Igor Sijsling	(Ukraine) Sergei Bubka	6–1, 7–5
2011	(United Kingdom) James Ward	(United States) Robby Ginepri	7–5, 6–4
2010	(Israel) Dudi Sela (3)	(Lithuania) Ričardas Berankis	7–5, 6–2
2009	(Cyprus) Marcos Baghdatis	(Belgium) Xavier Malisse	6–4, 6–4
2008	(Israel) Dudi Sela (2)	(United States) Kevin Kim	6–3, 6–0
2007	(Canada) Frédéric Niemeyer	(United States) Sam Querrey	4–6, 6–4, 6–3
2006	(South Africa) Rik de Voest	(United States) Amer Delic	7–6^{(7–4)}, 6–2
2005	(Israel) Dudi Sela	(Australia) Paul Baccanello	6–2, 6–3

=== Women's singles ===
Year	Champion	Runner-up	Score
2026	(Australia) Taylah Preston	(Australia) Maddison Inglis	7–6^{(7–5)}, 6–3
2023–2025	Not held		
2022	(Greece) Valentini Grammatikopoulou	(Italy) Lucia Bronzetti	6–2, 6–4
⬆️ WTA 125 event ⬆️
2021	Tournament cancelled due to the COVID-19 pandemic		
2020	Tournament cancelled due to the COVID-19 pandemic		
2019	(United Kingdom) Heather Watson	(Spain) Sara Sorribes Tormo	7–5, 6–4
2018	(Japan) Misaki Doi	(United Kingdom) Heather Watson	6–7^{(4–7)}, 6–1, 6–4
2017	(Belgium) Maryna Zanevska	(Montenegro) Danka Kovinić	5–7, 6–1, 6–3
2016	Not held		
2015	(United Kingdom) Johanna Konta (2)	(Belgium) Kirsten Flipkens	6–2, 6–4
2014	(Australia) Jarmila Gajdošová	(Ukraine) Lesia Tsurenko	3–6, 6–2, 7–6^{(7–3)}
2013	(United Kingdom) Johanna Konta	(Canada) Sharon Fichman	6–4, 6–2
2012	(United States) Mallory Burdette	(United States) Jessica Pegula	6–3, 6–0
2011	(Canada) Aleksandra Wozniak	(United States) Jamie Hampton	6–3, 6–1
2010	(Australia) Jelena Dokić	(France) Virginie Razzano	6–1, 6–4
2009	(Canada) Stéphanie Dubois	(India) Sania Mirza	1–6, 6–4, 6–4
2008	(Poland) Urszula Radwańska	(France) Julie Coin	2–6, 6–3, 7–5
2007	(United Kingdom) Anne Keothavong	(Canada) Stéphanie Dubois	7–5, 6–1
2006	(United States) Ansley Cargill (2)	(Canada) Valérie Tétreault	7–5, 6–4
2005	(United States) Ansley Cargill	(Canada) Mélanie Gloria	6–4, 6–2
↑ ITF event ↑
2004	(Czech Republic) Nicole Vaidišová	(United States) Laura Granville	2–6, 6–4, 6–2
↑ WTA Tier V event ↑
2003	(Germany) Anna-Lena Grönefeld	(Puerto Rico) Vilmarie Castellvi	6–2, 6–4
2002	(Russia) Maria Sharapova	(United States) Laura Granville	0–6, 6–3, 6–1
↑ ITF event ↑

=== Men's doubles ===
Year	Champions	Runners-up	Score
2026	(United States) Nathaniel Lammons (United States) Jackson Withrow	(United States) Daniel Milavsky (United States) Braden Shick	7–6^{(9–7)}, 7–6^{(7–1)}
2023–2025	Not held		
2022	(Sweden) André Göransson (Japan) Ben McLachlan	(Philippines) Treat Huey (Australia) John-Patrick Smith	6–7^{(4–7)}, 7–6^{(9–7)}, [11–9]
2021	Tournament cancelled due to the COVID-19 pandemic		
2020	Tournament cancelled due to the COVID-19 pandemic		
2019	(Sweden) Robert Lindstedt (United Kingdom) Jonny O'Mara	(Philippines) Treat Huey (Canada) Adil Shamasdin	6–2, 7–5
2018	(United Kingdom) Luke Bambridge (United Kingdom) Neal Skupski (2)	(Australia) Marc Polmans (Australia) Max Purcell	4–6, 6–3, [10–6]
2017	(United States) James Cerretani (United Kingdom) Neal Skupski	(Philippines) Treat Huey (Sweden) Robert Lindstedt	7–6^{(8–6)}, 6–2
2016	Not held		
2015	(Philippines) Treat Huey (3) (Denmark) Frederik Nielsen	(India) Yuki Bhambri (New Zealand) Michael Venus	7–6^{(7–4)}, 6–7^{(3–7)}, [10–5]
2014	(United States) Austin Krajicek (Australia) John-Patrick Smith	(New Zealand) Marcus Daniell (New Zealand) Artem Sitak	6–3, 4–6, [10–8]
2013	(Israel) Jonathan Erlich (Israel) Andy Ram	(United States) James Cerretani (Canada) Adil Shamasdin	6–1, 6–4
2012	(Belgium) Maxime Authom (Belgium) Ruben Bemelmans	(Australia) John Peers (Australia) John-Patrick Smith	6–4, 6–2
2011	(Philippines) Treat Conrad Huey (2) (United States) Travis Parrott (3)	(Australia) Jordan Kerr (United States) David Martin	6–2, 1–6, [16–14]
2010	(Philippines) Treat Conrad Huey (United Kingdom) Dominic Inglot	(United States) Ryan Harrison (United States) Jesse Levine	6–4, 7–5
2009	(South Africa) Kevin Anderson (South Africa) Rik de Voest (2)	(Paraguay) Ramón Delgado (United States) Kaes Van't Hof	6–4, 6–4
2008	(United States) Eric Butorac (United States) Travis Parrott (2)	(South Africa) Rik de Voest (Australia) Ashley Fisher	6–4, 7–6^{(7–3)}
2007	(South Africa) Rik de Voest (Australia) Ashley Fisher (2)	(United States) Alex Kuznetsov (United States) Donald Young	6–1, 6–2
2006	(United States) Eric Butorac (United States) Travis Parrott	(South Africa) Rik de Voest (United States) Glenn Weiner	4–6, 6–3, [11–9]
2005	(Australia) Ashley Fisher (United States) Tripp Phillips	(United States) Huntley Montgomery (United States) Rajeev Ram	7–6^{(8–6)}, 1–6, 6–3

=== Women's doubles ===
Year	Champions	Runners-up	Score
2026	(United States) Caroline Dolehide (Canada) Alexandra Vagramov	(United States) Anna Rogers (United States) Allura Zamarripa	6–1, 3–6, [10–6]
2023–2025	Not held		
2022	(Japan) Miyu Kato (2) (United States) Asia Muhammad (2)	(Hungary) Tímea Babos (United States) Angela Kulikov	6–3, 7–5
⬆️ WTA 125 event ⬆️
2021	Tournament cancelled due to the COVID-19 pandemic		
2020	Tournament cancelled due to the COVID-19 pandemic		
2019	(Japan) Nao Hibino (Japan) Miyu Kato	(United Kingdom) Naomi Broady (New Zealand) Erin Routliffe	6–2, 6–2
2018	(United States) Desirae Krawczyk (Mexico) Giuliana Olmos	(Ukraine) Kateryna Kozlova (Netherlands) Arantxa Rus	6–2, 7–5
2017	(Australia) Jessica Moore (United Kingdom) Jocelyn Rae	(United States) Desirae Krawczyk (Mexico) Giuliana Olmos	6–1, 7–5
2016	Not held		
2015	(United Kingdom) Johanna Konta (United States) Maria Sanchez (2)	(Romania) Raluca Olaru (United States) Anna Tatishvili	7–6^{(7–5)}, 6–4
2014	(United States) Asia Muhammad (United States) Maria Sanchez	(United States) Jamie Loeb (United States) Allie Will	6–3, 1–6, [10–8]
2013	(Canada) Sharon Fichman (Ukraine) Maryna Zanevska	(United States) Jacqueline Cako (United States) Natalie Pluskota	6–2, 6–2
2012	(Israel) Julia Glushko (Australia) Olivia Rogowska	(United States) Jacqueline Cako (United States) Natalie Pluskota	6–4, 5–7, [10–7]
2011	(Czech Republic) Karolína Plíšková (Czech Republic) Kristýna Plíšková	(United States) Jamie Hampton (Thailand) Noppawan Lertcheewakarn	5–7, 6–2, [10–2]
2010	(Chinese Taipei) Chang Kai-chen (Canada) Heidi El Tabakh	(United States) Irina Falconi (United States) Amanda Fink	3–6, 6–3, [10–4]
2009	(United States) Ahsha Rolle (United States) Riza Zalameda	(United States) Madison Brengle (United States) Lilia Osterloh	6–4, 6–3
2008	(United States) Carly Gullickson (Australia) Nicole Kriz (2)	(United States) Christina Fusano (Japan) Junri Namigata	6–7^{(4–7)}, 6–1, [10–5]
2007	(Canada) Stéphanie Dubois (Canada) Marie-Ève Pelletier	(Argentina) Soledad Esperón (Argentina) Agustina Lepore	6–4, 6–4
2006	(Australia) Nicole Kriz (United States) Story Tweedie-Yates	(United States) Jennifer Magley (United States) Courtney Nagle	7–5, 6–3
2005	(United Kingdom) Sarah Borwell (United States) Sarah Riske	(United States) Lauren Barnikow (Germany) Antonia Matic	6–4, 3–6, 7–6^{(7–0)}
↑ ITF event ↑
2004	(United States) Bethanie Mattek (United States) Abigail Spears	(Belgium) Els Callens (Germany) Anna-Lena Grönefeld	6–3, 6–3
↑ WTA Tier V event ↑
2003	(United States) Amanda Augustus (2) (Canada) Mélanie Marois	(Australia) Nicole Sewell (Netherlands) Andrea van den Hurk	7–6^{(7–4)}, 6–4
2002	(United States) Amanda Augustus (Canada) Renata Kolbovic	(United States) Lauren Kalvaria (United States) Gabriela Lastra	7–5, 7–5
↑ ITF event ↑
