= Lauren Albanese =

American tennis player (born 1989)

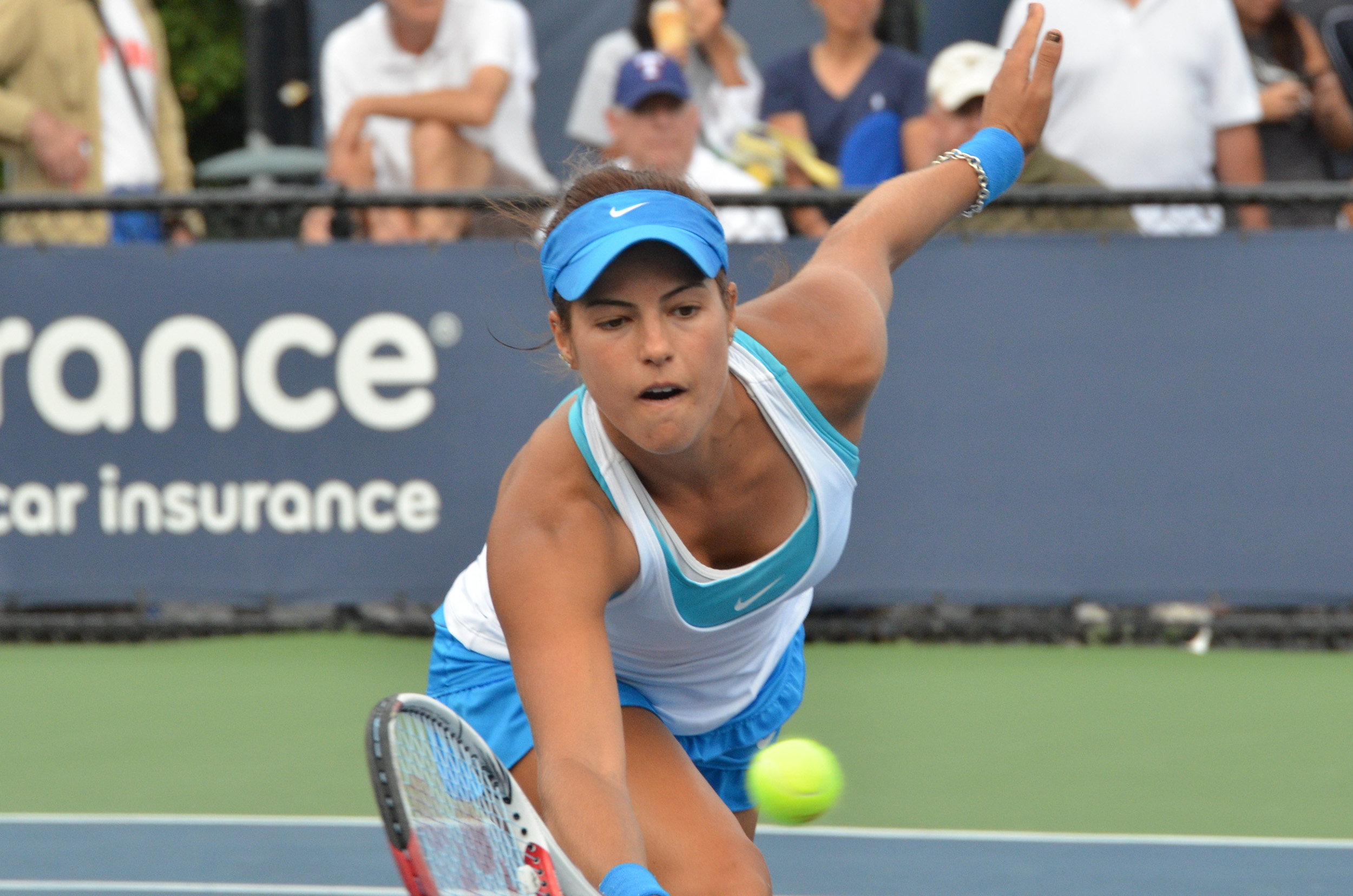
- Country (sports): United States
- Born: October 1, 1989 (age 36) Jacksonville, Florida
- Turned pro: 2006
- Plays: Right-handed
- Prize money: $258,167

Singles
- Career record: 265–236
- Career titles: 3 ITF
- Highest ranking: No. 158 (June 15, 2009)

Grand Slam singles results
- Australian Open: Q2 (2011)
- French Open: Q3 (2009)
- Wimbledon: Q2 (2009)
- US Open: 2R (2006)

Doubles
- Career record: 94–93
- Career titles: 5 ITF
- Highest ranking: No. 213 (February 28, 2011)

Grand Slam doubles results
- US Open: 1R (2009)

Lauren Albanese (born October 1, 1989) is an American former tennis player.

She began her professional career in 2006. Her highest WTA singles ranking is 158, which she reached on June 15, 2009. Her career high in doubles is 213, which she reached on February 28, 2011.

== ITF Circuit finals ==
=== Singles (3–10) ===
Legend $50,000 tournaments $25,000 tournaments $10,000 tournaments	Finals by surface Hard (3–7) Clay (0–3)

Result	No.	Date	Location	Surface	Opponent	Score
Win	1.	23 July 2006	Wichita, United States	Hard	(United States) Nicole Leimbach	6–0, 6–3
Loss	2.	30 July 2006	Evansville, United States	Hard	(United States) Audra Cohen	6–2, 2–6, 1–6
Loss	3.	28 May 2007	Carson, United States	Hard	(United States) Jessica Kirkland	6–7^{(2–7)}, 2–6
Loss	4.	18 May 2008	Raleigh, United States	Clay	(United States) Chelsey Gullickson	4–6, 6–2, 3–6
Loss	5.	15 June 2008	El Paso, United States	Hard	(United States) Anna Tatishvili	4–6, 3–6
Loss	6.	25 January 2009	Lutz, United States	Clay	(Canada) Sharon Fichman	4–6, 6–7^{(5–7)}
Loss	7.	8 February 2009	Rancho Mirage, United States	Hard	(Ukraine) Julia Vakulenko	0–6, 1–6
Win	8.	25 April 2010	Poza Rica, Mexico	Hard	(United States) Julia Cohen	6–4, 6–1
Loss	9.	14 April 2012	Caracas, Venezuela	Hard	(United States) Jennifer Elie	1–6, 2–6
Win	10.	28 July 2013	Austin, United States	Hard	(Bosnia and Herzegovina) Ema Burgić Bucko	7–5, 5–7, 7–6^{(7–4)}
Loss	11.	28 September 2013	Lambaré, Paraguay	Clay	(Paraguay) Montserrat González	2–6, 1–6
Loss	12.	3 November 2013	Quintana Roo, Mexico	Hard	(Mexico) Victoria Rodríguez	2–6, 4–6
Loss	13.	20 February 2016	Cuernavaca, Mexico	Hard	(Czech Republic) Marie Bouzková	6–0, 0–6, 1–6

=== Doubles (5–8) ===
Legend $50,000 tournaments $25,000 tournaments $10,000 tournaments	Finals by surface Hard (3–3) Clay (2–4) Carpet (0–1)

Result	No.	Date	Location	Surface	Partner	Opponents	Score
Win	1.	18 May 2007	Trivandrum, India	Clay	(Belgium) Yanina Wickmayer	(Italy) Nicole Clerico (Romania) Ágnes Szatmári	3–6, 7–5, 6–0
Loss	2.	21 October 2007	Makinohara, Japan	Carpet	(Belgium) Yanina Wickmayer	(Japan) Airi Hagimoto (Japan) Sakiko Shimizu	5–7, 3–6
Loss	3.	19 April 2008	Palm Beach Gardens, United States	Clay	(Russia) Ekaterina Afinogenova	(Czech Republic) Michaela Paštiková (Brazil) Maria Fernanda Alves	6–3, 3–6, [5–10]
Win	4.	14 June 2008	El Paso, United States	Hard	(South Africa) Surina De Beer	(United States) Lindsay Lee-Waters (United States) Ashley Weinhold	6–3, 6–3
Loss	5.	30 June 2008	Waterloo, Canada	Clay	(United States) Alexandra Mueller	(Japan) Akiko Yonemura (Japan) Tomoko Yonemura	1–6, 6–4, [3–10]
Loss	6.	8 November 2009	Rock Hill, United States	Clay	(United States) Jamie Hampton	(Canada) Sharon Fichman (United States) Anna Tatishvili	6–7^{(5–7)}, 6–4, [3–10]
Win	7.	24 April 2010	Poza Rica, Mexico	Hard	(United States) Julia Cohen	(United States) Macall Harkins (Brazil) Vivian Segnini	6–3, 7–6^{(8–6)}
Loss	8.	25 July 2010	Waterloo, Canada	Clay	(Chinese Taipei) Hsu Chieh-yu	(Canada) Elisabeth Abanda (Canada) Katarena Paliivets	w/o
Loss	9.	10 October 2010	Kansas City, United States	Hard	(United States) Irina Falconi	(United States) Julie Ditty (United States) Abigail Spears	2–6, 6–4, 4–6
Win	10.	14 April 2012	Caracas, Venezuela	Hard	(Slovakia) Zuzana Zlochová	(Brazil) Marcela Guimarães-Bueno (Brazil) Flavia Guimarães-Bueno	6–2, 6–3
Loss	11.	30 May 2014	Hilton Head, United States	Hard	(United States) Macall Harkins	(Canada) Sonja Molnar (United States) Caitlin Whoriskey	3–6, 4–6
Loss	12.	20 July 2014	Vancouver, Canada	Hard	(United States) Alexa Guarachi	(Japan) Yuka Higuchi (Japan) Hirono Watanabe	6–4, 2–6, [5–10]
Win	13.	5 December 2014	Santiago, Chile	Clay	(United States) Alexa Guarachi	(Chile) Fernanda Brito (Brazil) Eduarda Piai	6–4, 6–1
