= Rik de Voest =

South African tennis player

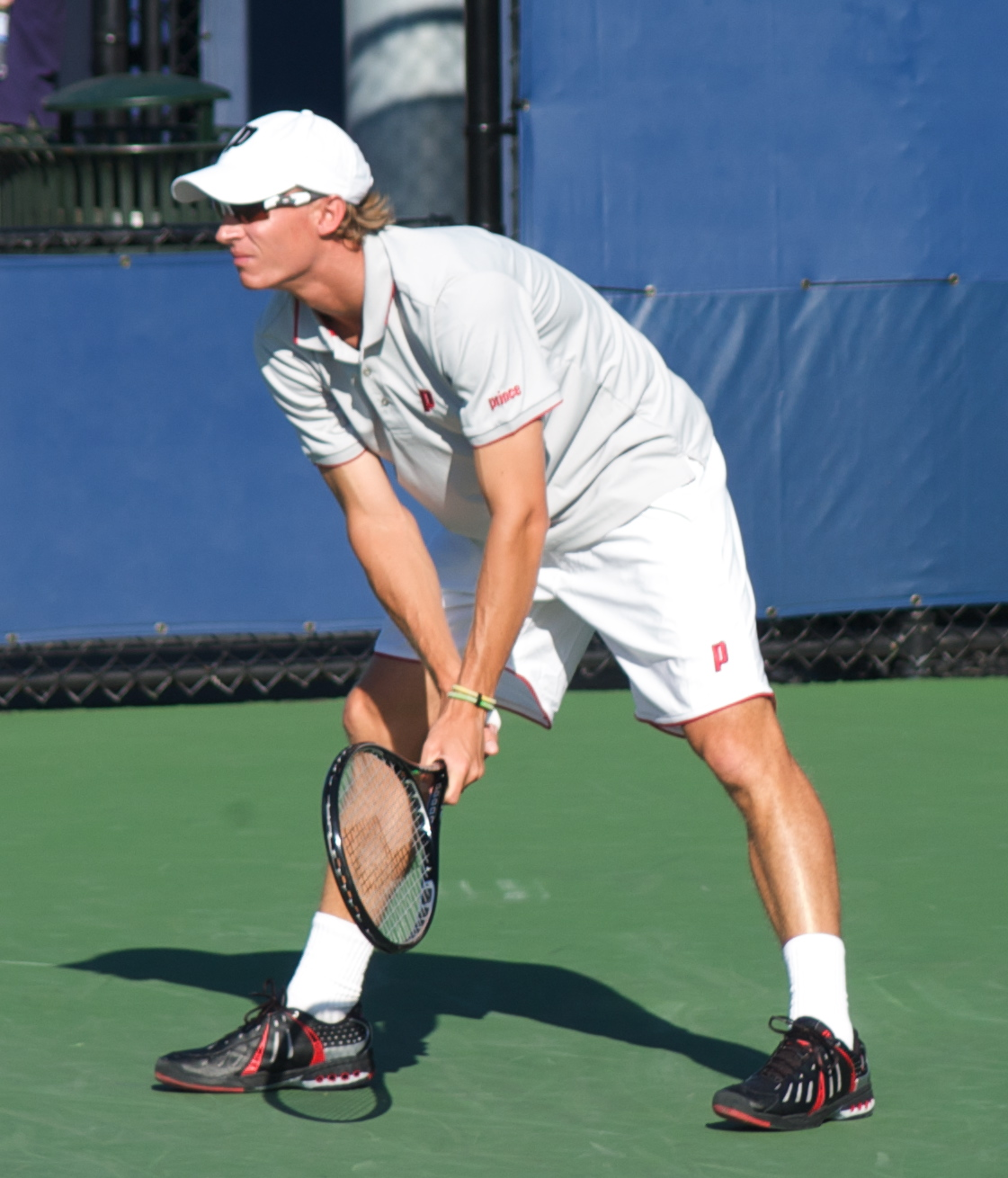
- Country (sports): South Africa
- Residence: Pretoria, South Africa; Vancouver, Canada
- Born: 5 June 1980 (age 45) Milan, Italy
- Height: 1.80 m (5 ft 11 in)
- Turned pro: 1999
- Retired: 2014
- Plays: Right-handed (two-handed backhand)
- Prize money: $1,349,991

Singles
- Career record: 33–54
- Career titles: 0
- Highest ranking: No. 110 (21 August 2006)

Grand Slam singles results
- Australian Open: 1R (2012)
- French Open: Q3 (2004, 2008)
- Wimbledon: 2R (2011)
- US Open: 2R (2007)

Doubles
- Career record: 46–48
- Career titles: 2
- Highest ranking: No. 39 (6 April 2009)

Grand Slam doubles results
- Australian Open: 2R (2008, 2009)
- French Open: 3R (2009)
- Wimbledon: 2R (2008)
- US Open: 3R (2008)

Grand Slam mixed doubles results
- Australian Open: 2R (2010)
- French Open: 2R (2009)
- Wimbledon: 1R (2009)

Team competitions
- Davis Cup: 27–19
- Last updated on: 5 November 2021.

Rik de Voest (born 5 June 1980) is a former professional South African tennis player. He achieved his career-high singles ranking of world No. 110 in August 2006. Rik resides in Vancouver, Canada where he pursues a career in real estate.

De Voest qualified for the 2007 Wimbledon Championships where he lost to Marat Safin in the first round. He also qualified for the US Open later on in 2007, where he defeated Thierry Ascione 6–2, 3–0 before Ascione retired. De Voest went on to lose to John Isner in the following round.

Playing with Scott Lipsky in men's doubles, he won the Levene Gouldin & Thompson Tennis Challenger in Binghamton, New York in 2009.

In Davis Cup matches for South Africa, de Voest has a win–loss record of 27–19 (18–16 in singles, 9–3 in doubles).

== Performance timelines ==
Key
W	F	SF	QF	#R	RR	Q#	DNQ	A	NH

(W) winner; (F) finalist; (SF) semifinalist; (QF) quarterfinalist; (#R) rounds 4, 3, 2, 1; (RR) round-robin stage; (Q#) qualification round; (DNQ) did not qualify; (A) absent; (NH) not held; (SR) strike rate (events won / competed); (W–L) win–loss record.

=== Singles ===
Tournament	2002	2003	2004	2005	2006	2007	2008	2009	2010	2011	2012	2013	2014	SR	W–L	Win%
Grand Slam tournaments
Australian Open	A	Q1	Q2	Q1	Q1	Q2	Q2	Q2	Q3	Q2	1R	Q1	Q1	0 / 1	0–1	0%
French Open	A	Q1	Q3	Q1	Q1	Q1	Q3	Q1	A	Q2	Q1	A	A	0 / 0	0–0	–
Wimbledon	Q1	Q1	Q1	Q2	Q1	1R	Q3	Q1	1R	2R	Q1	Q1	A	0 / 3	1–3	25%
US Open	A	A	Q1	Q3	Q2	2R	1R	Q2	1R	Q1	Q3	Q3	A	0 / 3	1–3	25%
Win–loss	0–0	0–0	0–0	0–0	0–0	1–2	0–1	0–0	0–2	1–1	0–1	0–0	0–0	0 / 7	2–7	22%
ATP Tour Masters 1000
Indian Wells	A	A	A	A	Q2	Q2	2R	1R	Q1	2R	1R	Q2	A	0 / 4	2–4	33%
Miami	A	A	A	A	Q2	Q2	Q1	Q2	A	Q1	Q1	A	A	0 / 0	0–0	–
Canada Masters	A	A	Q1	A	A	A	A	A	A	A	A	Q1	A	0 / 0	0–0	–
Cincinnati	A	A	A	A	1R	A	A	A	A	Q2	A	A	A	0 / 1	0–-1	0%
Shanghai	Not Held							A	A	Q2	A	A	A	0 / 0	0–0	–
Win–loss	0–0	0–0	0–0	0–0	0–1	0–0	1–1	0–1	0–0	1–1	0–1	0–0	0–0	0 / 5	2–5	29%

=== Doubles ===
Tournament	2003	2004	2005	2006	2007	2008	2009	2010	2011	2012	SR	W–L	Win%
Grand Slam tournaments
Australian Open	A	A	A	A	A	2R	2R	2R	A	A	0 / 3	3–3	50%
French Open	A	A	A	A	A	2R	3R	1R	A	A	0 / 3	3–3	50%
Wimbledon	Q1	1R	Q1	Q1	Q1	2R	1R	1R	Q1	Q2	0 / 4	1–4	20%
US Open	A	A	A	A	A	3R	2R	A	A	A	0 / 2	3–2	60%
Win–loss	0–0	0–1	0–0	0–0	0–0	5–4	4–4	1–3	0–0	0–0	0 / 12	10–12	45%
ATP Tour Masters 1000
Miami	A	A	A	A	A	A	2R	A	A	A	0 / 1	1–1	50%
Win–loss	0–0	0–0	0–0	0–0	0–0	0–0	1–1	0–0	0–0	0–0	0 / 1	1–1	50%

== ATP career finals ==
=== Doubles: 3 (2 titles, 1 runner-up) ===
Legend Grand Slam tournaments (0–0) ATP World Tour Finals (0–0) ATP Masters Series (0–0) ATP 500 Series (1–0) ATP 250 Series (1–1)	Finals by surface Hard (2–1) Clay (0–0) Grass (0–0) Carpet (0–0)	Finals by setting Outdoor (2–1) Indoor (0–0)

Result	W–L	Date	Tournament	Tier	Surface	Partner	Opponents	Score
Win	1–0	Sep 2007	Beijing, China	250 Series	Hard	(Australia) Ashley Fisher	(South Africa) Chris Haggard (Chinese Taipei) Lu Yen-hsun	6–7^{(3–7)}, 6–0, [10–6]
Loss	1–1	Feb 2009	Johannesburg, South Africa	250 Series	Hard	(Australia) Ashley Fisher	(United States) James Cerretani (Belgium) Dick Norman	6–7^{(7–9)}, 6–2, [14–12]
Win	2–1	Mar 2009	Dubai, United Arab Emirates	500 Series	Hard	(Russia) Dmitry Tursunov	(Czech Republic) Martin Damm (Sweden) Robert Lindstedt	4–6, 6–3, [10–5]

== ATP Challenger and ITF Futures finals ==
=== Singles: 27 (14–13) ===
Legend ATP Challenger (6–8) ITF Futures (8–5)	Finals by surface Hard (14–13) Clay (0–0) Grass (0–0) Carpet (0–0)

Result	W–L	Date	Tournament	Tier	Surface	Opponent	Score
Loss	0–1	Jul 1999	Indonesia F4, Jakarta	Futures	Hard	(South Korea) Yong-Il Yoon	6–7, 5–7
Win	1–1	Jun 2001	South Africa F1, Durban	Futures	Hard	(South Africa) Willem-Petrus Meyer	6–1, 6–1
Win	2–1	Jun 2001	South Africa F2, Durban	Futures	Hard	(South Africa) Raven Klaasen	7–6^{(7–4)}, 6–7^{(3–7)}, 6–3
Loss	2–2	Sep 2001	Italy F12, Selargius	Futures	Hard	(United States) Thomas Blake	4–6, 4–6
Loss	2–3	Apr 2002	Australia F2, Burnie	Futures	Hard	(Australia) Jaymon Crabb	4–6, 6–1, 3–6
Loss	2–4	May 2002	Uzbekistan F3, Andijan	Futures	Hard	(France) Rodolphe Cadart	3–6, 6–3, 2–6
Win	3–4	Sep 2002	Tunisia F2, El Menzah	Futures	Hard	(France) Rodolphe Cadart	6–2, 6–1
Win	4–4	Sep 2002	France F15, Bagnères-de-Bigorre	Futures	Hard	(France) Rodolphe Cadart	7–6^{(7–3)}, 5–7, 7–6^{(7–4)}
Loss	4–5	Nov 2002	Puebla, Mexico	Challenger	Hard	(United States) Alex Bogomolov Jr.	6–7^{(2–7)}, 3–6
Win	5–5	Mar 2004	Australia F2, Devonport	Futures	Hard	(Argentina) Juan Pablo Brzezicki	6–3, 7–6^{(7–5)}
Win	6–5	Feb 2005	Cherbourg, France	Challenger	Hard	(France) Nicolas Mahut	7–5, 6–2
Win	7–5	Oct 2005	Sacramento, United States	Challenger	Hard	(United States) Phillip Simmonds	3–6, 6–3, 6–4
Loss	7–6	Jan 2006	Nouméa, New Caledonia	Challenger	Hard	(France) Gilles Simon	2–6, 7–5, 2–6
Win	8–6	Apr 2006	Mexico City, Mexico	Challenger	Hard	(United States) Glenn Weiner	7–6^{(7–2)}, 7–6^{(7–2)}
Win	9–6	Aug 2006	Vancouver, Canada	Challenger	Hard	(United States) Amer Delić	7–6^{(7–4)}, 6–2
Loss	9–7	Jan 2007	Durban, South Africa	Challenger	Hard	(France) Mathieu Montcourt	7–5, 3–6, 2–6
Loss	9–8	Apr 2007	Tallahassee, United States	Challenger	Hard	(France) Jo-Wilfried Tsonga	1–6, 4–6
Loss	9–9	Apr 2009	Johannesburg, South Africa	Challenger	Hard	(France) Fabrice Santoro	5–7, 4–6
Win	10–9	Mar 2010	Rimouski, Canada	Challenger	Hard	(United States) Tim Smyczek	6–0, 7–5
Win	11–9	May 2010	India F5, New Delhi	Futures	Hard	(India) Karan Rastogi	7–5, 6–2
Loss	11–10	Apr 2011	Johannesburg, South Africa	Challenger	Hard	(South Africa) Izak van der Merwe	7–6^{(7–2)}, 5–7, 3–6
Loss	11–11	Nov 2011	Champaign-Urbana, United States	Challenger	Hard	(United States) Alex Kuznetsov	1–6, 3–6
Loss	11–12	Dec 2012	South Africa F1, Potchefstroom	Futures	Hard	(France) Simon Cauvard	3–6, 4–6
Win	12–12	Feb 2013	USA F5, Brownsville	Futures	Hard	(Republic of Ireland) James McGee	7–6^{(8–6)}, 6–1
Win	13–12	Mar 2013	Rimouski, Canada	Challenger	Hard	(Canada) Vasek Pospisil	7–6^{(8–6)}, 6–4
Win	14–12	Apr 2013	USA F9, Oklahoma City	Futures	Hard	(United Kingdom) Alex Bogdanovic	6–3, 6–2
Loss	14–13	May 2013	Kun-Ming, China	Challenger	Hard	(Russia) Alex Bogomolov Jr.	2–6, 6–4, 6–7^{(2–7)}

=== Doubles: 79 (47–32) ===
Legend ATP Challenger (37–21) ITF Futures (10–11)	Finals by surface Hard (40–30) Clay (4–1) Grass (1–1) Carpet (2–0)

Result	W–L	Date	Tournament	Tier	Surface	Partner	Opponents	Score
Loss	0–1	Jul 1999	Indonesia F3, Jakarta	Futures	Hard	(Mauritius) J-M Bourgault Du Coudray	(Indonesia) Sulistyo Wibowo (Indonesia) Bonit Wiryawan	4–6, 0–6
Loss	0–2	Dec 1999	Bangladesh F2, Dhaka	Futures	Hard	(South Africa) Willem-Petrus Meyer	(Australia) Ashley Fisher (United States) Minh Le	2–6, 4–6
Loss	0–3	May 2000	China F2, Chengdu	Futures	Hard	(South Africa) Johan Du Randt	(United States) Doug Bohaboy (United States) Alex Witt	6–3, 4–6, 5–7
Loss	0–4	Aug 2000	Luxembourg F1, Luxembourg	Futures	Clay	(South Africa) Willem-Petrus Meyer	(Germany) Christopher Kas (Belgium) Dick Norman	1–6, 6–7^{(2–7)}
Win	1–4	Sep 2000	France F17, Bagnères-de-Bigorre	Futures	Hard	(Canada) Frédéric Niemeyer	(Canada) David Abelson (Canada) Jerry Turek	6–3, 6–4
Win	2–4	Oct 2000	Italy F12, Selargius	Futures	Hard	(Austria) Luben Pampoulov	(United States) Keith Pollak (United States) Jeff Williams	7–6^{(7–4)}, 6–7^{(5–7)}, 6–4
Win	3–4	Dec 2000	Philippines F1, Manila	Futures	Hard	(South Africa) Andrew Anderson	(Australia) Domenic Marafiote (New Zealand) Lee Radovanovich	7–5, 6–7^{(5–7)}, 6–2
Loss	3–5	Mar 2001	New Zealand F1, Ashburton	Futures	Hard	(South Africa) Andrew Anderson	(Australia) Ashley Ford (Australia) Jordan Kerr	3–6, 4–6
Loss	3–6	May 2001	Uzbekistan F2, Andijan	Futures	Hard	(Russia) Igor Kunitsyn	(Finland) Tuomas Ketola (Australia) Jordan Kerr	7–5, 2–6, 1–6
Win	4–6	May 2001	Fergana, Uzbekistan	Challenger	Hard	(Russia) Igor Kunitsyn	(Canada) Simon Larose (Australia) Michael Tebbutt	6–1, 6–7^{(4–7)}, 6–3
Win	5–6	Oct 2001	France F18, Nevers	Futures	Hard	(France) Benjamin Cassaigne	(Brazil) Josh Goffi (United States) Nick Rainey	6–4, 6–2
Loss	5–7	Nov 2001	Thailand F2, Nonthaburi	Futures	Hard	(South Africa) Johan Du Randt	(Chinese Taipei) Lu Yen-hsun (Germany) Frank Moser	2–6, 4–6
Win	6–7	Nov 2001	Vietnam F1, Hanoi	Futures	Hard	(Israel) Lior Dahan	(Chinese Taipei) Lu Yen-hsun (Germany) Frank Moser	walkover
Loss	6–8	Mar 2002	Australia F1, Devonport	Futures	Hard	(South Africa) Willem-Petrus Meyer	(South Africa) Johan Du Randt (South Africa) Dirk Stegmann	4–6, 6–3, 4–6
Loss	6–9	May 2002	Uzbekistan F3, Andijan	Futures	Hard	(South Africa) Dirk Stegmann	(Finland) Tuomas Ketola (Pakistan) Aisam Qureshi	6–7^{(0–7)}, 3–6
Win	7–9	May 2002	Uzbekistan F4, Namangan	Futures	Hard	(South Africa) Dirk Stegmann	(Finland) Tuomas Ketola (Pakistan) Aisam Qureshi	7–5, 6–4
Win	8–9	May 2002	Fergana, Uzbekistan	Challenger	Hard	(South Africa) Dirk Stegmann	(Finland) Tuomas Ketola (Pakistan) Aisam Qureshi	6–3, 7–5
Win	9–9	Sep 2002	Tunisia F2, El Menzah	Futures	Hard	(South Africa) Dirk Stegmann	(France) Benoit Foucher (Canada) Philip Gubenco	6–4, 6–1
Loss	9–10	Sep 2002	France F16, Mulhouse	Futures	Hard	(South Africa) Dirk Stegmann	(Germany) Bernard Parun (Germany) Frank Moser	4–6, 7–6^{(7–5)}, 4–6
Win	10–10	Sep 2002	France F17, Plaisir	Futures	Hard	(South Africa) Dirk Stegmann	(France) Cyril Baudin (Belgium) Jeroen Masson	7–6^{(8–6)}, 6–3
Win	11–10	Mar 2003	Cherbourg, France	Challenger	Hard	(France) Benjamin Cassaigne	(United States) Brandon Coupe (United States) Scott Humphries	6–7^{(17–19)}, 7–6^{(7–5)}, 7–6^{(13–11)}
Win	12–10	Mar 2003	Ho Chi Minh City, Vietnam	Challenger	Hard	(South Africa) Wesley Moodie	(India) Rohan Bopanna (Netherlands) Fred Hemmes	6–3, 3–6, 6–3
Loss	12–11	Mar 2003	France F7, Poitiers	Futures	Hard	(France) Benjamin Cassaigne	(Switzerland) Yves Allegro (Italy) Daniele Bracciali	4–6, 0–6
Win	13–11	May 2003	Great Britain F6, Edinburgh	Futures	Clay	(Sweden) Marcus Sarstrand	(France) Stéphane Robert (Algeria) Slimane Saoudi	6–3, 6–1
Win	14–11	Jun 2003	Andorra La Vella, Andorra	Challenger	Hard	(Finland) Tuomas Ketola	(Brazil) Ricardo Mello (Brazil) Alexandre Simoni	6–4, 3–6, 6–4
Win	15–11	Jul 2003	Campos do Jordão, Brazil	Challenger	Hard	(Ecuador) Giovanni Lapentti	(Argentina) Carlos Berlocq (Mexico) Miguel Gallardo Valles	6–1, 7–5
Loss	15–12	Sep 2003	Grenoble, France	Challenger	Hard	(Sweden) Johan Landsberg	(Australia) Paul Baccanello (Israel) Harel Levy	7–5, 4–6, 6–7^{(5–7)}
Win	16–12	Oct 2003	Tumkur, India	Challenger	Hard	(India) Prakash Amritraj	(Slovakia) Michal Mertiňák (Slovakia) Branislav Sekáč	6–4, 6–3
Loss	16–13	Oct 2003	Dharwad, India	Challenger	Hard	(India) Prakash Amritraj	(Thailand) Sonchat Ratiwatana (Thailand) Sanchai Ratiwatana	6–3, 3–6, 5–7
Loss	16–14	Feb 2004	Dallas, United States	Challenger	Hard	(United States) Eric Taino	(Australia) Jordan Kerr (Australia) Todd Perry	5–7, 3–6
Win	17–14	Feb 2004	Ho Chi Minh City, Vietnam	Challenger	Hard	(Netherlands) Fred Hemmes	(Uzbekistan) Vadim Kutsenko (Russia) Yuri Schukin	6–3, 6–3
Win	18–14	Mar 2004	Kyoto, Japan	Challenger	Carpet	(Netherlands) Fred Hemmes	(Chinese Taipei) Lu Yen-hsun (United States) Jason Marshall	6–3, 6–7^{(8–10)}, 6–4
Win	19–14	Mar 2004	Burnie, Australia	Challenger	Hard	(Chinese Taipei) Lu Yen-hsun	(Italy) Leonardo Azzaro (Austria) Oliver Marach	6–3, 1–6, 7–5
Win	20–14	May 2004	Ljubljana, Slovenia	Challenger	Clay	(Ecuador) Giovanni Lapentti	(Sweden) Robert Lindstedt (United States) Michael Russell	6–3, 6–4
Loss	20–15	Aug 2004	Binghamton, United States	Challenger	Hard	(Australia) Nathan Healey	(United States) Huntley Montgomery (United States) Tripp Phillips	6–7^{(6–8)}, 6–7^{(4–7)}
Loss	20–16	Dec 2004	Mauritius, Mauritius	Challenger	Hard	(South Africa) Jeff Coetzee	(Romania) Andrei Pavel (Romania) Gabriel Trifu	3–6, 4–6
Win	21–16	Feb 2005	Dallas, United States	Challenger	Hard	(Ecuador) Giovanni Lapentti	(Paraguay) Ramón Delgado (Brazil) André Sá	6–4, 6–4
Win	22–16	Feb 2005	Joplin, United States	Challenger	Hard	(Poland) Łukasz Kubot	(United States) Nicholas Monroe (United States) Jeremy Wurtzman	7–6^{(7–4)}, 6–4
Loss	22–17	Apr 2005	Mexico City, Mexico	Challenger	Hard	(Poland) Łukasz Kubot	(United States) Rajeev Ram (United States) Bobby Reynolds	1–6, 7–6^{(9–7)}, 6–7^{(4–7)}
Loss	22–18	Jul 2005	Forest Hills, United States	Challenger	Grass	(Australia) Nathan Healey	(United States) Huntley Montgomery (United Kingdom) Richard Barker	6–3, 5–7, 6–7^{(6–8)}
Loss	22–19	Jul 2005	Lexington, United States	Challenger	Hard	(South Africa) Roger Anderson	(United States) Scoville Jenkins (United Kingdom) Bobby Reynolds	4–6, 4–6
Loss	22–20	Oct 2005	Tulsa, United States	Challenger	Hard	(Israel) Harel Levy	(United States) Scott Lipsky (United States) David Martin	0–6, 2–6
Loss	22–21	Oct 2005	Seoul, South Korea	Challenger	Hard	(Poland) Łukasz Kubot	(Austria) Alexander Peya (Germany) Björn Phau	6–0, 4–6, [7–10]
Win	23–21	Apr 2006	Tallahassee, United States	Challenger	Hard	(United States) Glenn Weiner	(United States) Bobby Reynolds (United States) Tripp Phillips	3–6, 6–3, [10–0]
Loss	23–22	Apr 2006	Valencia, United States	Challenger	Hard	(United States) Glenn Weiner	(United States) John Paul Fruttero (United States) Sam Warburg	5–7, 3–6
Loss	23–23	Apr 2006	Mexico City, Mexico	Challenger	Hard	(United States) Glenn Weiner	(Canada) Pierre-Ludovic Duclos (Brazil) André Ghem	4–6, 6–0, [3–10]
Loss	23–24	Aug 2006	Vancouver, Canada	Challenger	Hard	(United States) Glenn Weiner	(United States) Eric Butorac (United States) Travis Parrott	6–4, 3–6, [9–11]
Loss	23–25	Nov 2006	Nashville, United States	Challenger	Hard	(United States) Eric Nunez	(United States) Scott Lipsky (United States) David Martin	7–6^{(9–7)}, 4–6, [6–10]
Win	24–25	Nov 2006	Champaign-Urbana, United States	Challenger	Hard	(United States) Rajeev Ram	(United States) Brian Wilson (Brazil) André Sá	6–3, 4–6, [10–7]
Win	25–25	Jan 2007	Durban, South Africa	Challenger	Hard	(Germany) Dominik Meffert	(Switzerland) Stéphane Bohli (Israel) Noam Okun	6–4, 6–2
Win	26–25	May 2007	Lanzarote, Spain	Challenger	Hard	(Australia) Luke Bourgeois	(Israel) Dudi Sela (Israel) Noam Okun	6–3, 6–1
Win	27–25	Aug 2007	Vancouver, Canada	Challenger	Hard	(Australia) Ashley Fisher	(United States) Alex Kuznetsov (United States) Donald Young	6–1, 6–2
Loss	27–26	Sep 2007	Lubbock, United States	Challenger	Hard	(United States) Bobby Reynolds	(United States) Alex Kuznetsov (United States) Ryan Sweeting	3–6, 2–6
Win	28–26	Oct 2007	Seoul, South Korea	Challenger	Hard	(Chinese Taipei) Lu Yen-hsun	(Thailand) Sonchat Ratiwatana (Thailand) Sanchai Ratiwatana	6–3, 7–5
Loss	28–27	Nov 2007	Busan, South Korea	Challenger	Hard	(Canada) Pierre-Ludovic Duclos	(United States) Rajeev Ram (United States) Bobby Reynolds	0–6, 2–6
Loss	28–28	Nov 2007	Kaohsiung, Taiwan	Challenger	Hard	(Canada) Pierre-Ludovic Duclos	(India) Stephen Amritraj (Israel) Dudi Sela	4–6, 6–7^{(4–7)}
Win	29–28	Dec 2007	New Delhi, India	Challenger	Hard	(South Africa) Wesley Moodie	(India) Rohan Bopanna (Pakistan) Aisam Qureshi	6–4, 7–6^{(7–4)}
Win	30–28	Jan 2008	Heilbronn, Germany	Challenger	Hard	(United States) Bobby Reynolds	(Russia) Igor Kunitsyn (Pakistan) Aisam Qureshi	7–6^{(7–2)}, 6–7^{(5–7)}, [10–4]
Win	31–28	Apr 2008	Busan, South Korea	Challenger	Hard	(Poland) Łukasz Kubot	(Australia) Adam Feeney (Australia) Rameez Junaid	6–3, 6–3
Win	32–28	May 2008	Lanzarote, Spain	Challenger	Hard	(Poland) Łukasz Kubot	(Luxembourg) Gilles Müller (Pakistan) Aisam Qureshi	6–2, 7–6^{(7–2)}
Win	33–28	Jun 2008	Prostějov, Czech Republic	Challenger	Clay	(Poland) Łukasz Kubot	(South Africa) Chris Haggard (France) Nicolas Tourte	6–2, 6–2
Loss	33–29	Aug 2008	Vancouver, Canada	Challenger	Hard	(Australia) Ashley Fisher	(United States) Eric Butorac (United States) Travis Parrott	4–6, 6–7^{(3–7)}
Win	34–29	Nov 2008	Busan, South Korea	Challenger	Hard	(Australia) Ashley Fisher	(Sweden) Johan Brunström (Netherlands Antilles) Jean-Julien Rojer	6–2, 2–6, [10–6]
Win	35–29	Aug 2009	Vancouver, Canada	Challenger	Hard	(South Africa) Kevin Anderson	(Paraguay) Ramón Delgado (United States) Kaes Van't Hof	6–4, 6–4
Win	36–29	Aug 2009	Binghamton, United States	Challenger	Hard	(United States) Scott Lipsky	(Australia) Carsten Ball (United States) Kaes Van't Hof	7–6^{(7–2)}, 6–4
Win	37–29	Nov 2009	Seoul, South Korea	Challenger	Hard	(Chinese Taipei) Lu Yen-hsun	(Thailand) Sonchat Ratiwatana (Thailand) Sanchai Ratiwatana	7–6^{(7–5)}, 3–6, [10–6]
Win	38–29	Apr 2010	Athens, Greece	Challenger	Hard	(Chinese Taipei) Lu Yen-hsun	(Netherlands) Robin Haase (Netherlands) Igor Sijsling	6–3, 6–4
Loss	38–30	May 2010	Cremona, Italy	Challenger	Hard	(South Africa) Izak van der Merwe	(Austria) Martin Slanar (Austria) Alexander Peya	5–7, 5–7
Loss	38–31	Jul 2010	Winnetka, United States	Challenger	Hard	(India) Somdev Devvarman	(Canada) Pierre-Ludovic Duclos (United States) Ryler Deheart	6–7^{(4–7)}, 6–4, [8–10]
Win	39–31	Oct 2010	Sacramento, United States	Challenger	Hard	(South Africa) Izak van der Merwe	(United States) Nicholas Monroe (United States) Donald Young	4–6, 6–4, [10–7]
Loss	39–32	Oct 2010	Calabasas, United States	Challenger	Hard	(United States) Bobby Reynolds	(United States) Ryan Harrison (United States) Travis Rettenmaier	3–6, 3–6
Win	40–32	Nov 2010	Knoxville, United States	Challenger	Hard	(South Africa) Izak van der Merwe	(United States) Alex Bogomolov Jr. (United States) Alex Kuznetsov	6–1, 6–4
Win	41–32	May 2011	Savannah, United States	Challenger	Clay	(South Africa) Izak van der Merwe	(United States) Sekou Bangoura (United States) Jesse Witten	6–3, 6–3
Win	42–32	Jun 2011	Nottingham, United Kingdom	Challenger	Grass	(Canada) Adil Shamasdin	(South Africa) Izak van der Merwe (Philippines) Treat Huey	6–3, 7–6^{(9–7)}
Win	43–32	Nov 2011	Champaign-Urbana, United States	Challenger	Hard	(South Africa) Izak van der Merwe	(Germany) Martin Emmrich (Sweden) Andreas Siljeström	2–6, 6–3, [10–4]
Win	44–32	Aug 2012	Aptos, United States	Challenger	Hard	(Australia) John Peers	(Germany) Frank Moser (Australia) Chris Guccione	6–7^{(5–7)}, 6–1, [10–4]
Win	45–32	Oct 2012	Tiburon, United States	Challenger	Hard	(Australia) Chris Guccione	(Sweden) Andreas Siljeström (Australia) Jordan Kerr	6–1, 6–4
Win	46–32	Nov 2012	Ortisei, Italy	Challenger	Carpet	(Slovakia) Karol Beck	(Australia) Rameez Junaid (Germany) Michael Kohlmann	6–3, 6–4
Win	47–32	Jun 2014	Canada F3, Richmond	Futures	Hard	(United States) Matthew Seeberger	(Mexico) Hans Hach (Canada) Brayden Schnur	5–7, 7–5, [10–5]
