= Travis Parrott =

American tennis player

- Country (sports): United States
- Residence: Portland, Oregon
- Born: August 16, 1980 (age 44); Portland, Oregon
- Height: 1.85 m (6 ft 1 in)
- Turned pro: 2003
- Retired: 2012
- Plays: Right-handed
- Prize money: US$ 527,632

Singles
- Career record: 0–0
- Career titles: 0
- Highest ranking: No. 704 (June 9, 2003)

Doubles
- Career record: 94–109
- Career titles: 3
- Highest ranking: No. 25 (June 15, 2009)

Grand Slam doubles results
- Australian Open: 3R (2005, 2006)
- French Open: 3R (2006)
- Wimbledon: 3R (2004, 2008)
- US Open: QF (2004)

Mixed doubles
- Career record: 7–7
- Career titles: 1

Grand Slam mixed doubles results
- Australian Open: 1R (2010)
- Wimbledon: 3R (2005)
- US Open: W (2009)

Travis Parrott (born August 16, 1980) is an American former professional ATP tennis doubles player. He is primarily a doubles specialist. Travis is the son of Brian Parrott, a pro tennis organizer who helped bring a pair of Davis Cup events to Portland in the 1980s.

== Grand Slam results ==
Parrott participated in the 2008 French Open with Filip Polášek, losing in the first round to Michal Mertiňák and Jean-Claude Scherrer.

Parrott competed in doubles at the 2008 Wimbledon Championships, where he won his first round match with his partner Filip Polášek against sixth seeded Czech duo Pavel Vízner and Martin Damm. He and Polasek then defeated South African Rik de Voest and Polish player Łukasz Kubot. In the third round, they were defeated by Leander Paes and Lukáš Dlouhý.

Parrott was a surprise winner of the 2009 US Open mixed doubles event with Carly Gullickson, who had originally planned to team with Rajeev Ram. As wildcard entrants, this was the first time they'd ever played together.

== Doubles finals ==
=== Wins (3) ===
Legend
Grand Slam (0)
Tennis Masters Cup (0)
ATP Masters Series (0)
ATP International Series Gold (0)
ATP Tour (3)

No.	Date	Tournament	Surface	Partner	Opponents	Score
1.	July 28, 2003	Los Angeles, United States	Hard	(United States) Jan-Michael Gambill	(Australia) Joshua Eagle (Netherlands) Sjeng Schalken	6–4, 3–6, 7–5
2.	July 23, 2007	Indianapolis, U.S.	Hard	(Argentina) Juan Martín del Potro	(Russia) Teymuraz Gabashvili (Croatia) Ivo Karlović	3–6, 6–2, [10–6]
3.	October 20, 2008	Saint Petersburg, Russia	Carpet (i)	(Slovakia) Filip Polášek	(India) Rohan Bopanna (Belarus) Max Mirnyi	3–6, 7–6^{4}, [10–8]

=== Runners-up (6) ===
No.	Date	Tournament	Surface	Partner	Opponents	Score
1.	August 16, 2004	Washington, D.C., United States	Hard	(Russia) Dmitry Tursunov	(South Africa) Chris Haggard (South Africa) Robbie Koenig	7–6^{3}, 6–1
2.	July 4, 2005	Newport, U.S.	Grass	(United States) Graydon Oliver	(Australia) Jordan Kerr (United States) Jim Thomas	7–6^{5}, 7–6^{5}
3.	April 14, 2008	Valencia, Spain	Clay	(Slovakia) Filip Polášek	(Argentina) Máximo González (Argentina) Juan Mónaco	7–5, 7–5
4.	August 4, 2008	Los Angeles, U.S.	Hard	(Serbia) Dušan Vemić	(India) Rohan Bopanna (United States) Eric Butorac	7–6^{5}, 7–6^{5}
5.	February 22, 2009	Memphis, Tennessee, U.S.	Hard	(Slovakia) Filip Polášek	(United States) Mardy Fish (The Bahamas) Mark Knowles	7–6^{7}, 6–1
6.	June 19, 2009	Eastbourne, United Kingdom	Grass	(Slovakia) Filip Polášek	(Poland) Mariusz Fyrstenberg (Poland) Marcin Matkowski	6–4, 6–4

== Grand Slam finals ==
=== Mixed doubles (1 title) ===
Result	Year	Championship	Surface	Partner	Opponents	Score
Win	2009	US Open	Hard	(United States) Carly Gullickson	(Zimbabwe) Cara Black (India) Leander Paes	6–2, 6–4
