= 2017 Odlum Brown Vancouver Open =

- Date: August 14–20
- Edition: 12th (men); 15th (women)
- Category: ATP Challenger Tour; ITF Women's Circuit
- Prize money: US$100,000 (men); US$100,000 (women)
- Surface: Hard – outdoors
- Location: West Vancouver, British Columbia, Canada
- Venue: Hollyburn Country Club

Champions

Men's singles
- (Germany) Cedrik-Marcel Stebe

Women's singles
- (Belgium) Maryna Zanevska

Men's doubles
- (United States) James Cerretani / (United Kingdom) Neal Skupski

Women's doubles
- (Australia) Jessica Moore / (United Kingdom) Jocelyn Rae
← 2015 ·	Vancouver Open	· 2018 →

The 2017 Odlum Brown Vancouver Open was a professional tennis tournament played on outdoor hard courts. It was the 12th edition, for men, and 15th edition, for women, of the tournament and part of the 2017 ATP Challenger Tour and the 2017 ITF Women's Circuit, offering totals of $100,000, for men, and $100,000, for women, in prize money. It took place in West Vancouver, British Columbia, Canada between August 14 to August 20, 2017.

== Men's singles main-draw entrants ==
=== Seeds ===
Country	Player	Rank^{1}	Seed
ISR	Dudi Sela	77	1
AUS	Jordan Thompson	78	2
ROU	Marius Copil	86	3
SVK	Norbert Gombos	88	4
SUI	Henri Laaksonen	93	5
JPN	Taro Daniel	95	6
BEL	Ruben Bemelmans	97	7
USA	Tennys Sandgren	102	8

- ^{1} Rankings are as of August 7, 2017

=== Other entrants ===
The following players received wildcards into the singles main draw:

- (Canada) Philip Bester
- (Canada) Filip Peliwo
- (Canada) Brayden Schnur
- (Canada) Benjamin Sigouin

The following players received entry into the singles main draw as special exempts:

- (United Kingdom) Liam Broady
- (United States) Taylor Fritz

The following players received entry from the qualifying draw:

- (Zimbabwe) Takanyi Garanganga
- (South Africa) Lloyd Harris
- (United States) Thai-Son Kwiatkowski
- (Australia) Max Purcell

The following players received entry as lucky losers:

- (United States) JC Aragone
- (Australia) Marc Polmans
- (United States) Ryan Shane

== Women's singles main-draw entrants ==
=== Seeds ===
Country	Player	Rank^{1}	Seed
USA	Madison Brengle	72	1
JPN	Nao Hibino	75	2
SVK	Jana Čepelová	92	3
TUN	Ons Jabeur	101	4
USA	Julia Boserup	114	5
UKR	Kateryna Kozlova	116	6
CZE	Tereza Martincová	120	7
MNE	Danka Kovinić	123	8

- ^{1} Rankings are as of August 7, 2017

=== Other entrants ===
The following players received wildcards into the singles main draw:

- (Canada) Katherine Sebov
- (Canada) Aleksandra Wozniak
- (Canada) Carol Zhao

The following players entered the singles main draw with a protected ranking:

- (Slovenia) Polona Hercog
- (Switzerland) Stefanie Vögele

The following players received entry from the qualifying draw:

- (Belgium) Ysaline Bonaventure
- (Australia) Priscilla Hon
- (Japan) Eri Hozumi
- (Spain) Sílvia Soler Espinosa

== Champions ==
=== Men's singles ===
- (Germany) Cedrik-Marcel Stebe def. (Australia) Jordan Thompson, 6–0, 6–1

=== Women's singles ===
- (Belgium) Maryna Zanevska def. (Montenegro) Danka Kovinić, 5–7, 6–1, 6–3

=== Men's doubles ===
- (United States) James Cerretani / (United Kingdom) Neal Skupski def. (Philippines) Treat Huey / (Sweden) Robert Lindstedt, 7–6^{(8–6)}, 6–2

=== Women's doubles ===
- (Australia) Jessica Moore / (United Kingdom) Jocelyn Rae def. (United States) Desirae Krawczyk / (Mexico) Giuliana Olmos, 6–1, 7–5
