= 2018 Odlum Brown Vancouver Open – Women's singles =

Women's singles
- 2018 Odlum Brown Vancouver Open

Final
- Champion: (Japan) Misaki Doi
- Runner-up: (United Kingdom) Heather Watson
- Score: 6–7^{(4–7)}, 6–1, 6–4

Events
Singles	men	women
Doubles	men	women
← 2017 ·	Vancouver Open	· 2019 →

Maryna Zanevska was the defending champion, but lost to Nao Hibino in the second round.

Misaki Doi won the title after defeating Heather Watson 6–7^{(4–7)}, 6–1, 6–4 in the final.

== Seeds ==
1. (Ukraine) Kateryna Kozlova (second round)
2. (Belgium) Yanina Wickmayer (second round)
3. (Russia) Ekaterina Alexandrova (first round)
4. (Tunisia) Ons Jabeur (first round, retired)
5. (United Kingdom) Katie Boulter (quarterfinals)
6. (Germany) Mona Barthel (withdrew)
7. (Netherlands) Arantxa Rus (second round)
8. (Brazil) Beatriz Haddad Maia (second round)

== Draw ==
=== Key ===
- Q = Qualifier
- WC = Wild card
- LL = Lucky loser
- Alt = Alternate
- SE = Special exempt
- PR = Protected ranking
- ITF = ITF entry
- JE = Junior exempt
- w/o = Walkover
- r = Retired
- d = Defaulted
- SR = Special ranking

=== Finals ===
Semifinals
(Japan) Nao Hibino	2	2
(United Kingdom) Heather Watson	6	6
Q	(Japan) Misaki Doi	6	7
Q	(Italy) Martina Trevisan	4	5

Final
(United Kingdom) Heather Watson	7^{7}	1	4
Q	(Japan) Misaki Doi	6^{4}	6	6

=== Top half ===
First round
1	(Ukraine) K Kozlova	6	6
(France) F Ferro	3	3
(Paraguay) V Cepede Royg	2	2
(Canada) E Bouchard	6	6
WC	(Canada) G Dabrowski	3	3
(Japan) N Hibino	6	6
(Montenegro) D Kovinić	3	6^{3}
LL	(Belgium) M Zanevska	6	7^{7}
3	(Russia) E Alexandrova	2	2
(United Kingdom) H Watson	6	6
(Ukraine) M Kostyuk	4	7	0
(Belgium) Y Bonaventure	6	5	6
(United States) M Brengle	3	4
(Russia) A Kalinskaya	6	6
WC	(Canada) F Abanda	6	3	2
5	(United Kingdom) K Boulter	1	6	6

Second round
1	(Ukraine) K Kozlova	4	7	1
(Canada) E Bouchard	6	5	6
(Japan) N Hibino	6	1	6
LL	(Belgium) M Zanevska	2	6	3
(United Kingdom) H Watson	4	6	6
(Belgium) Y Bonaventure	6	4	4
(Russia) A Kalinskaya	5	2
5	(United Kingdom) K Boulter	7	6

Quarterfinals
(Canada) E Bouchard	6	1	3
(Japan) N Hibino	3	6	6
(United Kingdom) H Watson	6	3	6
5	(United Kingdom) K Boulter	3	6	1

Semifinals
(Japan) N Hibino	2	2
(United Kingdom) H Watson	6	6

=== Bottom half ===
First round
8	(Brazil) B Haddad Maia	6	6
(Canada) C Zhao	3	1
(Romania) A Dulgheru	6	6
(Hungary) F Stollár	2	1
Q	(Japan) M Doi	3	6	6
WC	(Canada) K Sebov	6	3	2
(Russia) I Khromacheva	6	0
4	(Tunisia) O Jabeur	3	0^{r}
7	(Netherlands) A Rus	4	6	6
Q	(Mexico) G Olmos	6	4	3
(Poland) M Fręch	2	7^{8}	0
Q	(Italy) M Trevisan	6	6^{6}	6
WC	(Canada) R Marino	4	6	7
(United Kingdom) N Broady	6	1	5
Q	(Israel) J Glushko	4	6^{2}
2	(Belgium) Y Wickmayer	6	7^{7}

Second round
8	(Brazil) B Haddad Maia	5	6^{7}
(Romania) A Dulgheru	7	7^{9}
Q	(Japan) M Doi	6	6
(Russia) I Khromacheva	0	0
7	(Netherlands) A Rus	2	2
Q	(Italy) M Trevisan	6	6
WC	(Canada) R Marino	7	7
2	(Belgium) Y Wickmayer	5	5

Quarterfinals
(Romania) A Dulgheru	4	0
Q	(Japan) M Doi	6	6
Q	(Italy) M Trevisan	2	6	7^{7}
WC	(Canada) R Marino	6	2	6^{3}

Semifinals
Q	(Japan) M Doi	6	7
Q	(Italy) M Trevisan	4	5
