= 2017 Odlum Brown Vancouver Open – Women's singles =

Women's singles
- 2017 Odlum Brown Vancouver Open

Final
- Champion: (Belgium) Maryna Zanevska
- Runner-up: (Montenegro) Danka Kovinić
- Score: 5–7, 6–1, 6–3

Events
Singles	men	women
Doubles	men	women
← 2015 ·	Vancouver Open	· 2018 →

Johanna Konta was the defending champion after winning the last event in 2015, but chose to participate in Cincinnati instead.

Maryna Zanevska won the title after defeating Danka Kovinić 5–7, 6–1, 6–3 in the final.

== Seeds ==
1. (United States) Madison Brengle (second round)
2. (Japan) Nao Hibino (quarterfinals)
3. (Slovakia) Jana Čepelová (second round)
4. (Tunisia) Ons Jabeur (quarterfinals, retired)
5. (United States) Julia Boserup (first round)
6. (Ukraine) Kateryna Kozlova (first round)
7. (Czech Republic) Tereza Martincová (first round)
8. (Montenegro) Danka Kovinić (final)

== Draw ==
=== Key ===
- Q = Qualifier
- WC = Wild card
- LL = Lucky loser
- Alt = Alternate
- SE = Special exempt
- PR = Protected ranking
- ITF = ITF entry
- JE = Junior exempt
- w/o = Walkover
- r = Retired
- d = Defaulted
- SR = Special ranking

=== Finals ===
Semifinals
8	(Montenegro) Danka Kovinić	6	7^{7}
WC	(Canada) Carol Zhao	3	6^{4}
(Belgium) Maryna Zanevska	6	4	6
(Croatia) Jana Fett	2	6	2

Final
8	(Montenegro) Danka Kovinić	7	1	3
(Belgium) Maryna Zanevska	5	6	6

=== Top half ===
First round
1	(United States) M Brengle	6	6
(Hungary) D Gálfi	4	1
WC	(Canada) K Sebov	7^{7}	4	5
(Italy) J Paolini	6^{5}	6	7
(Netherlands) A Rus	3	2
(United Kingdom) N Broady	6	6
(Canada) B Andreescu	6	2	4
8	(Montenegro) D Kovinić	2	6	6
4	(Tunisia) O Jabeur	6	6
Q	(Spain) S Soler Espinosa	2	1
Q	(Belgium) Y Bonaventure	7^{7}	5	4
(Romania) PM Țig	6^{3}	7	6
WC	(Canada) A Wozniak	6	4	5
WC	(Canada) C Zhao	2	6	7
(Belgium) Y Wickmayer	6	6
6	(Ukraine) K Kozlova	3	3

Second round
1	(United States) M Brengle	7^{7}	2	5
(Italy) J Paolini	6^{3}	6	7
(United Kingdom) N Broady	1^{r}
8	(Montenegro) D Kovinić	2
4	(Tunisia) O Jabeur	1	6	6
(Romania) PM Țig	6	2	2
WC	(Canada) C Zhao	0	6	6
(Belgium) Y Wickmayer	6	4	4

Quarterfinals
(Italy) J Paolini	3	4
8	(Montenegro) D Kovinić	6	6
4	(Tunisia) O Jabeur	2	2^{r}
WC	(Canada) C Zhao	6	4

Semifinals
8	(Montenegro) D Kovinić	6	7^{7}
WC	(Canada) C Zhao	3	6^{4}

=== Bottom half ===
First round
5	(United States) J Boserup	3	4
(Italy) M Trevisan	6	6
(Australia) Ar Rodionova	3	3^{r}
(Belgium) M Zanevska	6	4
(Czech Republic) B Krejčíková	6^{2}	6	4
Q	(Australia) P Hon	7^{7}	3	6
PR	(Slovenia) P Hercog	4	1
3	(Slovakia) J Čepelová	6	6
7	(Czech Republic) T Martincová	4	2
(Croatia) J Fett	6	6
Q	(Japan) E Hozumi	6^{4}	3
(Romania) M Buzărnescu	7^{7}	6
PR	(Switzerland) S Vögele	4	7	3
(South Korea) S-j Jang	6	5	6
(United States) L Chirico	6	4	1
2	(Japan) N Hibino	3	6	6

Second round
(Italy) M Trevisan	2	6	2
(Belgium) M Zanevska	6	2	6
Q	(Australia) P Hon	6	2	6
3	(Slovakia) J Čepelová	4	6	2
(Croatia) J Fett	4	7	6
(Romania) M Buzărnescu	6	5	3
(South Korea) S-j Jang	5	4
2	(Japan) N Hibino	7	6

Quarterfinals
(Belgium) M Zanevska	6	6
Q	(Australia) P Hon	4	4
(Croatia) J Fett	4	6	6
2	(Japan) N Hibino	6	1	3

Semifinals
(Belgium) M Zanevska	6	4	6
(Croatia) J Fett	2	6	2
