= 2018 Odlum Brown Vancouver Open – Men's singles =

Men's singles
- 2018 Odlum Brown Vancouver Open

Final
- Champion: (United Kingdom) Dan Evans
- Runner-up: (Australia) Jason Kubler
- Score: 4–6, 7–5, 7–6^{(7–3)}

Events
Singles	men	women
Doubles	men	women
← 2017 ·	Vancouver Open	· 2019 →

Cedrik-Marcel Stebe was the defending champion but chose not to defend his title.

Dan Evans won the title after defeating Jason Kubler 4–6, 7–5, 7–6^{(7–3)} in the final.

== Seeds ==
1. (Canada) Vasek Pospisil (semifinals)
2. (Australia) Jordan Thompson (first round)
3. (Italy) Thomas Fabbiano (second round)
4. (Australia) Jason Kubler (final)
5. (Luxembourg) Gilles Müller (second round)
6. (Canada) Peter Polansky (second round)
7. (Belarus) Ilya Ivashka (quarterfinals)
8. (Belgium) Ruben Bemelmans (second round)

== Draw ==
=== Key ===
- Q = Qualifier
- WC = Wild card
- LL = Lucky loser
- Alt = Alternate
- SE = Special exempt
- PR = Protected ranking
- ITF = ITF entry
- JE = Junior exempt
- w/o = Walkover
- r = Retired
- d = Defaulted
- SR = Special ranking

=== Finals ===
Semifinals
1/WC	(Canada) Vasek Pospisil	6	5	2
Q	(United Kingdom) Dan Evans	3	7	6
4	(Australia) Jason Kubler	4	7^{8}	6
(France) Grégoire Barrère	6	6^{6}	2

Final
Q	(United Kingdom) Dan Evans	4	7	7^{7}
4	(Australia) Jason Kubler	6	5	6^{3}

=== Top half ===
First round
1/WC	(Canada) V Pospisil	7^{8}	3	6
WC	(Canada) B Sigouin	6^{6}	6	3
(Australia) M Polmans	6	6
(United States) E King	2	2
SE	(South Africa) L Harris	6	6
Q	(United States) T-S Kwiatkowski	3	4
(Canada) F Auger-Aliassime	4	2
8/WC	(Belgium) R Bemelmans	6	6
3	(Italy) T Fabbiano	6	6
(Canada) F Peliwo	4	2
(United States) E Escobedo	4	4
Q	(United Kingdom) D Evans	6	6
(United Kingdom) L Broady	2	2
(France) Q Halys	6	6
PR	(Ukraine) I Marchenko	6	3	5
7	(Belarus) I Ivashka	4	6	7

Second round
1/WC	(Canada) V Pospisil	5	6	6
(Australia) M Polmans	7	3	2
SE	(South Africa) L Harris	6	6
8/WC	(Belgium) R Bemelmans	1	3
3	(Italy) T Fabbiano	3	6	3
Q	(United Kingdom) D Evans	6	3	6
(France) Q Halys	2	5
7	(Belarus) I Ivashka	6	7

Quarterfinals
1/WC	(Canada) V Pospisil	6^{6}	7^{13}	6
SE	(South Africa) L Harris	7^{8}	6^{11}	3
Q	(United Kingdom) D Evans	6	6
7	(Belarus) I Ivashka	4	4

Semifinals
1/WC	(Canada) V Pospisil	6	5	2
Q	(United Kingdom) D Evans	3	7	6

=== Bottom half ===
First round
6	(Canada) P Polansky	7^{7}	5	6
PR	(Colombia) S Giraldo	6^{5}	7	3
Q	(United States) JC Aragone	3	6	6
(Australia) A Bolt	6	2	4
Q	(Croatia) B Gojo	6	6
(United States) K King	4	3
(Italy) S Travaglia	3	6^{2}
4	(Australia) J Kubler	6	7^{7}
5	(Luxembourg) G Müller	6	4	6
SE	(United States) C Eubanks	4	6	3
WC	(Canada) B Schnur	5	6^{2}
(Germany) Y Maden	7	7^{7}
(France) G Barrère	6^{8}	6	6
(Egypt) M Safwat	7^{10}	4	2
(Australia) T Kokkinakis	6	1	6
2	(Australia) J Thompson	4	6	3

Second round
6	(Canada) P Polansky	6^{4}	6^{3}
Q	(United States) JC Aragone	7^{7}	7^{7}
Q	(Croatia) B Gojo	4	5
4	(Australia) J Kubler	6	7
5	(Luxembourg) G Müller	4	6^{7}
(Germany) Y Maden	6	7^{9}
(France) G Barrère	w/o
(Australia) T Kokkinakis

Quarterfinals
Q	(United States) JC Aragone	6	2	4
4	(Australia) J Kubler	2	6	6
(Germany) Y Maden	3	4
(France) G Barrère	6	6

Semifinals
4	(Australia) J Kubler	4	7^{8}	6
(France) G Barrère	6	6^{6}	2
