= 2018 Odlum Brown Vancouver Open – Women's doubles =

Women's doubles
- 2018 Odlum Brown Vancouver Open

Final
- Champions: (United States) Desirae Krawczyk (Mexico) Giuliana Olmos
- Runners-up: (Ukraine) Kateryna Kozlova (Netherlands) Arantxa Rus
- Score: 6–2, 7–5

Events
Singles	men	women
Doubles	men	women
← 2017 ·	Vancouver Open	· 2019 →

Jessica Moore and Jocelyn Rae were the defending champions, however Rae retired from professional tennis in December 2017, while Moore decided not to participate.

Desirae Krawczyk and Giuliana Olmos won the title, defeating Kateryna Kozlova and Arantxa Rus in the final, 6–2, 7–5.

== Seeds ==
1. (United Kingdom) Naomi Broady / (Hungary) Fanny Stollár (first round)
2. (United States) Desirae Krawczyk / (Mexico) Giuliana Olmos (champions)
3. (Chile) Alexa Guarachi / (New Zealand) Erin Routliffe (first round)
4. (Russia) Anna Kalinskaya / (Russia) Irina Khromacheva (quarterfinals, retired)

== Draw ==
=== Key ===
- Q = Qualifier
- WC = Wild card
- LL = Lucky loser
- Alt = Alternate
- SE = Special exempt
- PR = Protected ranking
- ITF = ITF entry
- JE = Junior exempt
- w/o = Walkover
- r = Retired
- d = Defaulted
- SR = Special ranking

=== Draw ===
First round
1	(United Kingdom) N Broady (Hungary) F Stollár	2	2
(Ukraine) K Kozlova (Netherlands) A Rus	6	6
(Belgium) Y Bonaventure (Belgium) Y Wickmayer	6	5	[9]
(United States) M Brengle (United States) L Chirico	1	7	[11]
3	(Chile) A Guarachi (New Zealand) E Routliffe	3	6	[6]
WC	(Canada) C Branstine (Canada) R Marino	6	3	[10]
WC	(Ukraine) M Kostyuk (Kazakhstan) E Rybakina	6	6
WC	(United States) J Failla (Canada) A Vagramov	3	2
(Japan) M Doi (Georgia (country)) O Kalashnikova	6	6
(United Kingdom) K Dunne (United Kingdom) E Webley-Smith	3	4
(Montenegro) D Kovinić (Belgium) M Zanevska	2	7	[9]
4	(Russia) A Kalinskaya (Russia) I Khromacheva	6	5	[11]
(Australia) M Inglis (United States) R McAdoo	4	2
(Brazil) B Haddad Maia (Brazil) L Stefani	6	6
(United States) S Marand (Mexico) V Rodríguez	2	2
2	(United States) D Krawczyk (Mexico) G Olmos	6	6

Quarterfinals
(Ukraine) K Kozlova (Netherlands) A Rus	6	6
(United States) M Brengle (United States) L Chirico	3	3
WC	(Canada) C Branstine (Canada) R Marino	6	6
WC	(Ukraine) M Kostyuk (Kazakhstan) E Rybakina	3	4
(Japan) M Doi (Georgia (country)) O Kalashnikova	6	1
4	(Russia) A Kalinskaya (Russia) I Khromacheva	2	0^{r}
(Brazil) B Haddad Maia (Brazil) L Stefani	5	6	[5]
2	(United States) D Krawczyk (Mexico) G Olmos	7	3	[10]

Semifinals
(Ukraine) K Kozlova (Netherlands) A Rus	6	0
WC	(Canada) C Branstine (Canada) R Marino	1	0^{r}
(Japan) M Doi (Georgia (country)) O Kalashnikova	6^{4}	6	[9]
2	(United States) D Krawczyk (Mexico) G Olmos	7^{7}	2	[11]

Final
(Ukraine) K Kozlova (Netherlands) A Rus	2	5
2	(United States) D Krawczyk (Mexico) G Olmos	6	7
