= 2017 Odlum Brown Vancouver Open – Women's doubles =

Women's doubles
- 2017 Odlum Brown Vancouver Open

Final
- Champions: (Australia) Jessica Moore (United Kingdom) Jocelyn Rae
- Runners-up: (United States) Desirae Krawczyk (Mexico) Giuliana Olmos
- Score: 6–1, 7–5

Events
Singles	men	women
Doubles	men	women
← 2015 ·	Vancouver Open	· 2018 →

Johanna Konta and Maria Sanchez were the defending champions, having won the previous edition in 2015, but Konta chose to participate in Cincinnati instead. Sanchez partnered Sílvia Soler Espinosa, but they lost in the quarterfinals to Emina Bektas and Alexa Guarachi.

Jessica Moore and Jocelyn Rae won the title after defeating Desirae Krawczyk and Giuliana Olmos 6–1, 7–5 in the final.

== Seeds ==
1. (Japan) Eri Hozumi / (Japan) Miyu Kato (semifinals)
2. (United States) Nicole Melichar / (United Kingdom) Anna Smith (first round)
3. (Australia) Monique Adamczak / (Australia) Storm Sanders (quarterfinals)
4. (Australia) Jessica Moore / (United Kingdom) Jocelyn Rae (champions)

== Draw ==
=== Key ===
- Q = Qualifier
- WC = Wild card
- LL = Lucky loser
- Alt = Alternate
- SE = Special exempt
- PR = Protected ranking
- ITF = ITF entry
- JE = Junior exempt
- w/o = Walkover
- r = Retired
- d = Defaulted
- SR = Special ranking

First round
1	(Japan) E Hozumi (Japan) M Kato	6	2	[14]
(United States) A Weinhold (Canada) C Zhao	3	6	[12]
(Canada) B Andreescu (Hungary) D Gálfi	7	4	[7]
WC	(United States) K Christian (Canada) A Wozniak	5	6	[10]
4	(Australia) J Moore (United Kingdom) J Rae	6	4	[10]
(Romania) M Buzărnescu (Belarus) V Lapko	4	6	[7]
(Netherlands) A Rus (Belgium) M Zanevska	7	2	[10]
WC	(United States) UM Arconada (Canada) C Robillard-Millette	5	6	[4]
(Belgium) Y Bonaventure (United Kingdom) N Broady	7	4	[9]
(United States) D Krawczyk (Mexico) G Olmos	5	6	[11]
(Greece) V Grammatikopoulou (United Kingdom) E Webley-Smith	6^{4}	3
3	(Australia) M Adamczak (Australia) S Sanders	7^{7}	6
(Montenegro) D Kovinić (United States) A Tatishvili	4	4
(United States) M Sanchez (Spain) S Soler Espinosa	6	6
(United States) E Bektas (Chile) A Guarachi	4	7	[12]
2	(United States) N Melichar (United Kingdom) A Smith	6	5	[10]

Quarterfinals
1	(Japan) E Hozumi (Japan) M Kato	6	6
WC	(United States) K Christian (Canada) A Wozniak	0	2
4	(Australia) J Moore (United Kingdom) J Rae	2
(Netherlands) A Rus (Belgium) M Zanevska	1^{r}
(United States) D Krawczyk (Mexico) G Olmos	2	6	[10]
3	(Australia) M Adamczak (Australia) S Sanders	6	2	[7]
(United States) M Sanchez (Spain) S Soler Espinosa	3	2
(United States) E Bektas (Chile) A Guarachi	6	6

Semifinals
1	(Japan) E Hozumi (Japan) M Kato	7^{10}	4	[8]
4	(Australia) J Moore (United Kingdom) J Rae	6^{8}	6	[10]
(United States) D Krawczyk (Mexico) G Olmos	7	7^{7}
(United States) E Bektas (Chile) A Guarachi	5	6^{1}

Final
4	(Australia) J Moore (United Kingdom) J Rae	6	7
(United States) D Krawczyk (Mexico) G Olmos	1	5
