= 2015 Odlum Brown Vancouver Open – Men's singles =

Men's singles
- 2015 Odlum Brown Vancouver Open

Final
- Champion: (Israel) Dudi Sela
- Runner-up: (Australia) John-Patrick Smith
- Score: 6–4, 7–5

Events
Singles	men	women
Doubles	men	women
- Vancouver Open

Marcos Baghdatis was the defending champion, but decided not participate this year.

Dudi Sela won the tournament, defeating John-Patrick Smith in the final.

== Seeds ==
1. (Lithuania) Ričardas Berankis (first round)
2. (Australia) John Millman (second round)
3. (Latvia) Ernests Gulbis (first round)
4. (Belgium) Ruben Bemelmans (second round)
5. (Japan) Go Soeda (withdrew)
6. (United Kingdom) Kyle Edmund (withdrew)
7. (Japan) Taro Daniel (second round)
8. (Colombia) Alejandro González (first round)

== Draw ==
Key

- Q = Qualifier
- WC = Wild card
- LL = Lucky loser
- Alt = Alternate
- ITF = ITF entry
- PR = Protected ranking
- SR = Special ranking
- SE = Special exempt
- JE = Junior exempt
- JR = Junior Accelerator Programme entrant
- CO = College Accelerator Programme entrant
- NG = Next Gen Accelerator Program entrant
- w/o = Walkover
- r = Retired
- d = Defaulted

=== Finals ===
Semifinals
(Israel) Dudi Sela	6	6
(India) Yuki Bhambri	2	4
Q	(United Kingdom) Daniel Evans	6	2	3
(Australia) John-Patrick Smith	4	6	6

Final
(Israel) Dudi Sela	6	7
(Australia) John-Patrick Smith	4	5

=== Top half ===
First round
1	(Lithuania) R Berankis	4	1
(Estonia) J Zopp	6	6
(Italy) M Donati	4	7^{7}	6
WC	(United States) D Novikov	6	6^{4}	1
LL	(Canada) P Bester	4	3
Q	(Argentina) G Andreozzi	6	6
(Israel) D Sela	6	7^{7}
Q	(France) M Hamou	4	6^{3}
3/WC	(Latvia) E Gulbis	3	7^{7}	6^{2}
(Ukraine) I Marchenko	6	6^{5}	7^{7}
LL	(France) M Bourgue	6	6^{4}	2
(Uzbekistan) F Dustov	4	7^{7}	6
(Colombia) A Falla	3	0
(India) Y Bhambri	6	6
(Romania) M Copil	w/o
5	(Japan) G Soeda

Second round
(Estonia) J Zopp	6^{5}	6	6
(Italy) M Donati	7^{7}	2	2
Q	(Argentina) G Andreozzi	7^{7}	5	0^{r}
(Israel) D Sela	6^{4}	7	1
(Ukraine) I Marchenko	6	4	2
(Uzbekistan) F Dustov	4	6	6
(India) Y Bhambri	3	7^{7}	6
(Romania) M Copil	6	6^{3}	2

Quarterfinals
(Estonia) J Zopp	4	7^{7}	1
(Israel) D Sela	6	6^{4}	6
(Uzbekistan) F Dustov	4	4
(India) Y Bhambri	6	6

Semifinals
(Israel) D Sela	6	6
(India) Y Bhambri	2	4

=== Bottom half ===
First round
7	(Japan) T Daniel	6
(Australia) M Ebden	0	r
Q	(United Kingdom) D Evans	6	6
Q	(Czech Republic) R Štěpánek	4	1
(United Kingdom) B Klein	6	6
(United States) A Krajicek	4	3
(Portugal) G Elias	6	5	2
4	(Belgium) R Bemelmans	3	7	6
8	(Colombia) A González	3	1
(Australia) J-P Smith	6	6
(Austria) J Melzer	6	7
(Sweden) E Ymer	2	5
(United Kingdom) L Broady	4	3
(Russia) K Khachanov	6	6
WC	(United States) A Sarkissian	1	1
2	(Australia) J Millman	6	6

Second round
7	(Japan) T Daniel	6	3	6^{6}
Q	(United Kingdom) D Evans	4	6	7^{8}
(United Kingdom) B Klein	6	3	7^{7}
4	(Belgium) R Bemelmans	3	6	6^{4}
(Australia) J-P Smith	6	6
(Austria) J Melzer	3	2
(Russia) K Khachanov	7^{8}	4	7^{7}
2	(Australia) J Millman	6^{6}	6	6^{4}

Quarterfinals
Q	(United Kingdom) D Evans	7^{7}	6^{7}	6
(United Kingdom) B Klein	6^{1}	7^{9}	0
(Australia) J-P Smith	7	6
(Russia) K Khachanov	5	1

Semifinals
Q	(United Kingdom) D Evans	6	2	3
(Australia) J-P Smith	4	6	6
