= 2018 Odlum Brown Vancouver Open – Men's doubles =

Men's doubles
- 2018 Odlum Brown Vancouver Open

Final
- Champions: (United Kingdom) Luke Bambridge (United Kingdom) Neal Skupski
- Runners-up: (Australia) Marc Polmans (Australia) Max Purcell
- Score: 4–6, 6–3, [10–6]

Events
Singles	men	women
Doubles	men	women
← 2017 ·	Vancouver Open	· 2019 →

James Cerretani and Neal Skupski were the defending champions but only Skupski chose to defend his title, partnering Luke Bambridge. Skupski successfully defended his title.

Bambridge and Skupski won the title after defeating Marc Polmans and Max Purcell 4–6, 6–3, [10–6] in the final.

== Seeds ==
1. (Israel) Jonathan Erlich / (Pakistan) Aisam-ul-Haq Qureshi (quarterfinals)
2. (United Kingdom) Luke Bambridge / (United Kingdom) Neal Skupski (champions)
3. (United States) Austin Krajicek / (India) Purav Raja (quarterfinals)
4. (United States) Evan King / (United States) Nathan Pasha (first round)

== Draw ==
=== Key ===
- Q = Qualifier
- WC = Wild card
- LL = Lucky loser
- Alt = Alternate
- SE = Special exempt
- PR = Protected ranking
- ITF = ITF entry
- JE = Junior exempt
- w/o = Walkover
- r = Retired
- d = Defaulted
- SR = Special ranking

First round
1	(Israel) J Erlich (Pakistan) A-u-H Qureshi	6	7^{7}
Alt	(United States) H Johnson (United States) Y Johnson	3	6^{2}
(France) G Barrère (France) Q Halys	7^{7}	1	[6]
(United States) A Lawson (United States) H Reese	6^{5}	6	[10]
3	(United States) A Krajicek (India) P Raja	6	6
(South Africa) R Roelofse (Australia) L Saville	3	4
(Australia) M Polmans (Australia) M Purcell	6	3	[10]
WC	(United States) JC Aragone (Canada) B Sigouin	4	6	[6]
(Australia) A Bolt (Australia) J Thompson	3	6	[10]
WC	(Canada) Joshua Peck (Canada) Luka Vukovic	6	3	[8]
(Italy) T Fabbiano (Australia) M Reid	1	6	[10]
4	(United States) E King (United States) N Pasha	6	3	[8]
(United Kingdom) L Broady (United Kingdom) J O'Mara	4	4
(Mexico) H Hach Verdugo (Sweden) A Siljeström	6	6
(Germany) Y Maden (Italy) S Travaglia	1	3
2	(United Kingdom) L Bambridge (United Kingdom) N Skupski	6	6

Quarterfinals
1	(Israel) J Erlich (Pakistan) A-u-H Qureshi	3	1
(United States) A Lawson (United States) H Reese	6	6
3	(United States) A Krajicek (India) P Raja	6	6^{5}	[4]
(Australia) M Polmans (Australia) M Purcell	4	7^{7}	[10]
(Australia) A Bolt (Australia) J Thompson	3	4
(Italy) T Fabbiano (Australia) M Reid	6	6
(Mexico) H Hach Verdugo (Sweden) A Siljeström	4	6^{4}
2	(United Kingdom) L Bambridge (United Kingdom) N Skupski	6	7^{7}

Semifinals
(United States) A Lawson (United States) H Reese	4	3
(Australia) M Polmans (Australia) M Purcell	6	6
(Italy) T Fabbiano (Australia) M Reid	3	2
2	(United Kingdom) L Bambridge (United Kingdom) N Skupski	6	6

Final
(Australia) M Polmans (Australia) M Purcell	6	3	[6]
2	(United Kingdom) L Bambridge (United Kingdom) N Skupski	4	6	[10]
