= 2019 Odlum Brown Vancouver Open – Men's doubles =

Men's doubles
- 2019 Odlum Brown Vancouver Open

Final
- Champions: (Sweden) Robert Lindstedt (United Kingdom) Jonny O'Mara
- Runners-up: (Philippines) Treat Huey (Canada) Adil Shamasdin
- Score: 6–2, 7–5

Events
Singles	men	women
Doubles	men	women
← 2018 ·	Vancouver Open	· 2022 →

Luke Bambridge and Neal Skupski were the defending champions but only Bambridge chose to defend his title, partnering Ben McLachlan. Bambridge lost in the quarterfinals to Treat Huey and Adil Shamasdin.

Robert Lindstedt and Jonny O'Mara won the title after defeating Huey and Shamasdin 6–2, 7–5 in the final.

== Seeds ==
1. (United Kingdom) Luke Bambridge / (Japan) Ben McLachlan (quarterfinals)
2. (Sweden) Robert Lindstedt / (United Kingdom) Jonny O'Mara (champions)
3. (Australia) Max Purcell / (Australia) Matt Reid (first round)
4. (United States) James Cerretani / (Israel) Jonathan Erlich (semifinals)

== Draw ==
=== Key ===
- Q = Qualifier
- WC = Wild card
- LL = Lucky loser
- Alt = Alternate
- ITF = ITF entry
- PR = Protected ranking
- SR = Special ranking
- SE = Special exempt
- JE = Junior exempt
- JR = Junior Accelerator Programme entrant
- CO = College Accelerator Programme entrant
- NG = Next Gen Accelerator Program entrant
- w/o = Walkover
- r = Retired
- d = Defaulted

First round
1	(United Kingdom) L Bambridge (Japan) B McLachlan	7^{7}	6
(Sweden) A Göransson (United States) H Reese	6^{4}	3
ITF	(United States) Jordi Arconada (United States) M Cressy	3	6^{9}
PR	(Philippines) T Huey (Canada) A Shamasdin	6	7^{11}
3	(Australia) M Purcell (Australia) M Reid	7^{7}	2	[8]
WC	(Canada) Stewart Block (Canada) P Polansky	6^{5}	6	[10]
(Venezuela) R Maytín (United States) J Withrow	2	7^{7}	[12]
(United States) A Lawson (Germany) M Zverev	6	6^{2}	[10]
PR	(Mexico) MÁ Reyes-Varela (United States) M Schnur	2	4
(United States) R Galloway (United States) N Lammons	6	6
ITF	(Colombia) A Gómez (United States) JA Ore	3	4
4	(United States) J Cerretani (Israel) J Erlich	6	6
(Lithuania) R Berankis (Mexico) H Hach Verdugo	4	6	[7]
WC	(Canada) A Galarneau (Canada) B Sigouin	6	2	[10]
WC	(Canada) T Baadi (Canada) L Draxl	0	4
2	(Sweden) R Lindstedt (United Kingdom) J O'Mara	6	6

Quarterfinals
1	(United Kingdom) L Bambridge (Japan) B McLachlan	7	6^{11}	[12]
PR	(Philippines) T Huey (Canada) A Shamasdin	5	7^{13}	[14]
WC	(Canada) S Block (Canada) P Polansky	1	4
(Venezuela) R Maytín (United States) J Withrow	6	6
(United States) R Galloway (United States) N Lammons	6	3	[7]
4	(United States) J Cerretani (Israel) J Erlich	4	6	[10]
WC	(Canada) A Galarneau (Canada) B Sigouin	4	4
2	(Sweden) R Lindstedt (United Kingdom) J O'Mara	6	6

Semifinals
PR	(Philippines) T Huey (Canada) A Shamasdin	6	6
(Venezuela) R Maytín (United States) J Withrow	2	2
4	(United States) J Cerretani (Israel) J Erlich	5	3
2	(Sweden) R Lindstedt (United Kingdom) J O'Mara	7	6

Final
PR	(Philippines) T Huey (Canada) A Shamasdin	2	5
2	(Sweden) R Lindstedt (United Kingdom) J O'Mara	6	7
