= 2017 Odlum Brown Vancouver Open – Men's doubles =

Men's doubles
- 2017 Odlum Brown Vancouver Open

Final
- Champions: (United States) James Cerretani (United Kingdom) Neal Skupski
- Runners-up: (Philippines) Treat Huey (Sweden) Robert Lindstedt
- Score: 7–6^{(8–6)}, 6–2

Events
Singles	men	women
Doubles	men	women
← 2015 ·	Vancouver Open	· 2018 →

Treat Huey and Frederik Nielsen were the defending champions but chose to defend their title with different partners. Huey partnered Robert Lindstedt but lost in the final to James Cerretani and Neal Skupski. Nielsen partnered Andreas Siljeström but lost in the semifinals to Huey and Lindstedt.

Cerretani and Skupski won the title after defeating Huey and Lindstedt 7–6^{(8–6)}, 6–2 in the final.

== Seeds ==
1. (Philippines) Treat Huey / (Sweden) Robert Lindstedt (final)
2. (United States) James Cerretani / (United Kingdom) Neal Skupski (champions)
3. (Australia) Steven de Waard / (Australia) Marc Polmans (quarterfinals, withdrew)
4. (United Kingdom) Brydan Klein / (Australia) Andrew Whittington (first round)

== Draw ==
=== Key ===
- Q = Qualifier
- WC = Wild card
- LL = Lucky loser
- Alt = Alternate
- SE = Special exempt
- PR = Protected ranking
- ITF = ITF entry
- JE = Junior exempt
- w/o = Walkover
- r = Retired
- d = Defaulted
- SR = Special ranking

First round
1	(Philippines) T Huey (Sweden) R Lindstedt	6	6
(Belgium) J De Loore (United States) Chad Rhoden	1	1
(Belgium) R Bemelmans (Australia) A Bolt	3	7^{7}	[10]
(France) B Bonzi (France) Q Halys	6	6^{4}	[3]
4	(United Kingdom) B Klein (Australia) A Whittington	5	2
(Denmark) F Nielsen (Sweden) A Siljeström	7	6
(Canada) F Peliwo (Canada) B Schnur	4	4
(South Africa) L Harris (Israel) D Sela	6	6
(United States) A Krajicek (United States) T Sandgren	6	3	[8]
(United States) JC Aragone (United States) R Shane	3	6	[10]
WC	(Canada) Alexander Day (United States) T-S Kwiatkowski	3	2
3	(Australia) S de Waard (Australia) M Polmans	6	6
(Canada) P Bester (Romania) M Copil	6	6
WC	(Canada) George Jecminek (Canada) Luka Vukovic	4	2
(United Kingdom) L Bambridge (Republic of Ireland) D O'Hare	4	4
2	(United States) J Cerretani (United Kingdom) N Skupski	6	6

Quarterfinals
1	(Philippines) T Huey (Sweden) R Lindstedt	7^{7}	4	[11]
(Belgium) R Bemelmans (Australia) A Bolt	6^{3}	6	[9]
(Denmark) F Nielsen (Sweden) A Siljeström	6	6
(South Africa) L Harris (Israel) D Sela	2	1
(United States) JC Aragone (United States) R Shane	w/o
3	(Australia) S de Waard (Australia) M Polmans
(Canada) P Bester (Romania) M Copil	5	6^{5}
2	(United States) J Cerretani (United Kingdom) N Skupski	7	7^{7}

Semifinals
1	(Philippines) T Huey (Sweden) R Lindstedt	7^{7}	7^{9}
(Denmark) F Nielsen (Sweden) A Siljeström	6^{0}	6^{7}
(United States) JC Aragone (United States) R Shane	4	3
2	(United States) J Cerretani (United Kingdom) N Skupski	6	6

Final
1	(Philippines) T Huey (Sweden) R Lindstedt	6^{6}	2
2	(United States) J Cerretani (United Kingdom) N Skupski	7^{8}	6
