= 2015 Odlum Brown Vancouver Open – Women's doubles =

Women's doubles
- 2015 Odlum Brown Vancouver Open

Final
- Champions: (United Kingdom) Johanna Konta (United States) Maria Sanchez
- Runners-up: (Romania) Raluca Olaru (United States) Anna Tatishvili
- Score: 7–6^{(7–5)}, 6–4

Events
Singles	men	women
Doubles	men	women
← 2014 ·	Vancouver Open	· 2017 →

Asia Muhammad and Maria Sanchez were the defending champions, but Muhammad chose not to participate. Sanchez partnered Johanna Konta and successfully defended her title, defeating Raluca Olaru and Anna Tatishvili in the final, 7–6^{(7–5)}, 6–4.

== Seeds ==
1. (Japan) Shuko Aoyama / (Canada) Gabriela Dabrowski (quarterfinals)
2. (Ukraine) Lyudmyla Kichenok / (Luxembourg) Mandy Minella (quarterfinals)
3. (United Kingdom) Jocelyn Rae / (United Kingdom) Anna Smith (quarterfinals)
4. (Romania) Raluca Olaru / (United States) Anna Tatishvili (final)

== Draw ==
=== Key ===
- Q = Qualifier
- WC = Wild card
- LL = Lucky loser
- Alt = Alternate
- SE = Special exempt
- PR = Protected ranking
- ITF = ITF entry
- JE = Junior exempt
- w/o = Walkover
- r = Retired
- d = Defaulted
- SR = Special ranking

First round
1	(Japan) S Aoyama (Canada) G Dabrowski	7^{7}	6
(France) A Lim (France) P Parmentier	6^{4}	3
(Chile) A Guarachi (United States) S Marand	4	4
(Netherlands) K Bertens (Latvia) J Ostapenko	6	6
4	(Romania) R Olaru (United States) A Tatishvili	7	7^{9}
(Czech Republic) E Hrdinová (Israel) S Pe'er	5	6^{7}
(Japan) N Hibino (United Kingdom) E Webley-Smith	4	6	[10]
(United States) V King (United States) S Rogers	6	2	[7]
(United Kingdom) J Konta (United States) M Sanchez	4	6	[10]
(Japan) E Hozumi (Japan) H Kuwata	6	4	[4]
WC	(Canada) H El Tabakh (United Kingdom) L Robson	2	4
3	(United Kingdom) J Rae (United Kingdom) A Smith	6	6
WC	(United States) K Christian (United States) S Santamaria	3	2
WC	(Canada) S Fichman (Canada) C Zhao	6	6
(China) X Han (Thailand) V Wongteanchai	0	3
2	(Ukraine) L Kichenok (Luxembourg) M Minella	6	6

Quarterfinals
1	(Japan) S Aoyama (Canada) G Dabrowski	4	5
(Netherlands) K Bertens (Latvia) J Ostapenko	6	7
4	(Romania) R Olaru (United States) A Tatishvili	6	7^{9}
(Japan) N Hibino (United Kingdom) E Webley-Smith	2	6^{7}
(United Kingdom) J Konta (United States) M Sanchez	6	6
3	(United Kingdom) J Rae (United Kingdom) A Smith	3	4
WC	(Canada) S Fichman (Canada) C Zhao	6	6^{5}	[10]
2	(Ukraine) L Kichenok (Luxembourg) M Minella	2	7^{7}	[4]

Semifinals
(Netherlands) K Bertens (Latvia) J Ostapenko	4	4
4	(Romania) R Olaru (United States) A Tatishvili	6	6
(United Kingdom) J Konta (United States) M Sanchez	7^{7}	6
WC	(Canada) S Fichman (Canada) C Zhao	6^{2}	2

Final
4	(Romania) R Olaru (United States) A Tatishvili	6^{5}	4
(United Kingdom) J Konta (United States) M Sanchez	7^{7}	6
