= 2018 Odlum Brown Vancouver Open =

- Date: 13–19 August
- Edition: 13th (ATP); 16th (ITF)
- Category: ATP Challenger Tour; ITF Women's Circuit
- Prize money: $100,000 (ATP) $100,000 (ITF)
- Surface: Hard
- Location: Vancouver, British Columbia, Canada

Champions

Men's singles
- (United Kingdom) Dan Evans

Women's singles
- (Japan) Misaki Doi

Men's doubles
- (United Kingdom) Luke Bambridge / (United Kingdom) Neal Skupski

Women's doubles
- (United States) Desirae Krawczyk / (Mexico) Giuliana Olmos
← 2017 ·	Vancouver Open	· 2019 →

The 2018 Odlum Brown Vancouver Open was a professional tennis tournament played on outdoor hard courts. It was the thirteenth (ATP) and sixteenth (ITF) editions of the tournament and was part of the 2018 ATP Challenger Tour and the 2018 ITF Women's Circuit. It took place in Vancouver, British Columbia, Canada, on 13–19 August 2018.

== Men's singles main draw entrants ==
=== Seeds ===
Country	Player	Rank^{1}	Seed
CAN	Vasek Pospisil	94	1
AUS	Jordan Thompson	100	2
ITA	Thomas Fabbiano	105	3
AUS	Jason Kubler	106	4
LUX	Gilles Müller	114	5
CAN	Peter Polansky	121	6
BLR	Ilya Ivashka	125	7
BEL	Ruben Bemelmans	130	8

- ^{1} Rankings as of 6 August 2018.

=== Other entrants ===
The following players received a wildcard into the singles main draw:

- (Belgium) Ruben Bemelmans
- (Canada) Vasek Pospisil
- (Canada) Brayden Schnur
- (Canada) Benjamin Sigouin

The following players received entry into the singles main draw using protected rankings:

- (Colombia) Santiago Giraldo
- (Ukraine) Illya Marchenko

The following players received entry into the singles main draw as special exempts:

- (United States) Christopher Eubanks
- (South Africa) Lloyd Harris

The following players received entry from the qualifying draw:

- (United States) JC Aragone
- (United Kingdom) Dan Evans
- (Croatia) Borna Gojo
- (United States) Thai-Son Kwiatkowski

== Women's singles main draw entrants ==
=== Seeds ===
Country	Player	Rank^{1}	Seed
UKR	Kateryna Kozlova	89	1
BEL	Yanina Wickmayer	94	2
RUS	Ekaterina Alexandrova	99	3
TUN	Ons Jabeur	112	4
GBR	Katie Boulter	114	5
~~GER~~	~~Mona Barthel~~	~~115~~	~~6~~
NED	Arantxa Rus	116	7
BRA	Beatriz Haddad Maia	118	8

- ^{1} Rankings as of 6 August 2018.

=== Other entrants ===
The following players received a wildcard into the singles main draw:

- (Canada) Françoise Abanda
- (Canada) Gabriela Dabrowski
- (Canada) Rebecca Marino
- (Canada) Katherine Sebov

The following players received entry from the qualifying draw:

- (Japan) Misaki Doi
- (Israel) Julia Glushko
- (Mexico) Giuliana Olmos
- (Italy) Martina Trevisan

The following player received entry as a lucky loser:

- (Belgium) Maryna Zanevska

== Champions ==
=== Men's singles ===
- (United Kingdom) Dan Evans def. (Australia) Jason Kubler 4–6, 7–5, 7–6^{(7–3)}

=== Women's singles ===
- (Japan) Misaki Doi def. (United Kingdom) Heather Watson 6–7^{(4–7)}, 6–1, 6–4

=== Men's doubles ===
- (United Kingdom) Luke Bambridge / (United Kingdom) Neal Skupski def. (Australia) Marc Polmans / (Australia) Max Purcell 4–6, 6–3, [10–6].

=== Women's doubles ===
- (United States) Desirae Krawczyk / (Mexico) Giuliana Olmos def. (Ukraine) Kateryna Kozlova / (Netherlands) Arantxa Rus, 6–2, 7–5
