= 2019 Odlum Brown Vancouver Open – Men's singles =

Men's singles
- 2019 Odlum Brown Vancouver Open

Final
- Champion: (Lithuania) Ričardas Berankis
- Runner-up: (Chinese Taipei) Jason Jung
- Score: 6–3, 5–7, 6–4

Events
Singles	men	women
Doubles	men	women
← 2018 ·	Vancouver Open	· 2022 →

Dan Evans was the defending champion but chose not to defend his title.

Ričardas Berankis won the title after defeating Jason Jung 6–3, 5–7, 6–4 in the final.

== Seeds ==
All seeds receive a bye into the second round.

1. (Lithuania) Ričardas Berankis (champion)
2. (United States) Steve Johnson (second round)
3. (Canada) Brayden Schnur (third round)
4. (Tunisia) Malek Jaziri (third round)
5. (Brazil) Thiago Monteiro (third round, retired)
6. (Bosnia and Herzegovina) Damir Džumhur (second round)
7. (Russia) Evgeny Donskoy (third round)
8. (Germany) Dominik Köpfer (third round)
9. (Latvia) Ernests Gulbis (second round)
10. (Chinese Taipei) Jason Jung (final)
11. (Australia) Alex Bolt (second round)
12. (South Korea) Chung Hyeon (third round)
13. (Belarus) Egor Gerasimov (second round)
14. (Serbia) Viktor Troicki (withdrew)
15. (Australia) James Duckworth (withdrew)
16. (Australia) Marc Polmans (quarterfinals)

== Draw ==
=== Key ===
- Q = Qualifier
- WC = Wild card
- LL = Lucky loser
- Alt = Alternate
- ITF = ITF entry
- PR = Protected ranking
- SR = Special ranking
- SE = Special exempt
- JE = Junior exempt
- JR = Junior Accelerator Programme entrant
- CO = College Accelerator Programme entrant
- NG = Next Gen Accelerator Program entrant
- w/o = Walkover
- r = Retired
- d = Defaulted

=== Finals ===
Quarterfinals
1	(Lithuania) Ričardas Berankis	2	6	6
(Australia) Thanasi Kokkinakis	6	4	3
(France) Enzo Couacaud	6^{3}	6	4
(Japan) Go Soeda	7^{7}	3	6
(France) Maxime Janvier	7	7
Q	(United Kingdom) Liam Broady	5	5
10	(Chinese Taipei) Jason Jung	5	6	6
16	(Australia) Marc Polmans	7	4	4

Semifinals
1	(Lithuania) Ričardas Berankis	6	6
(Japan) Go Soeda	1	1
(France) Maxime Janvier	5	6^{4}
10	(Chinese Taipei) Jason Jung	7	7^{7}

Final
1	(Lithuania) Ričardas Berankis	6	5	6
10	(Chinese Taipei) Jason Jung	3	7	4

=== Top half ===
==== Section 1 ====
First round
WC	(Canada) F Peliwo	5	4
Q	(Greece) M Pervolarakis	7	6
ITF	(United States) Jordi Arconada	5	3
ITF	(United Kingdom) L Glasspool	7	6
(Germany) M Zverev	6^{2}	5
(Australia) T Kokkinakis	7^{7}	7
ITF	(United States) M Cressy	6	7^{9}
WC	(Canada) A Galarneau	3	6^{7}

Second round
1	(Lithuania) R Berankis	4	6	6
Q	(Greece) M Pervolarakis	6	3	4
ITF	(United Kingdom) L Glasspool	6	6
LL	(Canada) T Baadi	3	2
11	(Australia) A Bolt	2	4
(Australia) T Kokkinakis	6	6
ITF	(United States) M Cressy	4	6	1
8	(Germany) D Köpfer	6	3	6

Third round
1	(Lithuania) R Berankis	7^{7}	6
ITF	(United Kingdom) L Glasspool	6^{4}	1
(Australia) T Kokkinakis	6	6
8	(Germany) D Köpfer	4	4

Quarterfinals
1	(Lithuania) R Berankis	2	6	6
(Australia) T Kokkinakis	6	4	3

==== Section 2 ====
First round
(China) Z Li	3	6	1
(Australia) A Santillan	6	4	6
(France) E Couacaud	1	6	6
(United Kingdom) J Ward	6	4	3
(Japan) G Soeda	7^{8}	6
(Japan) Yo Watanuki	6^{6}	2
ITF	(Netherlands) T van Rijthoven	6^{7}	6	6
(Slovakia) L Lacko	7^{9}	4	1

Second round
3	(Canada) B Schnur	6	2	6
(Australia) A Santillan	2	6	4
(France) E Couacaud	6	6^{4}	7
13	(Belarus) E Gerasimov	3	7^{7}	5
9/WC	(Latvia) E Gulbis	3	2
(Japan) G Soeda	6	6
ITF	(Netherlands) T van Rijthoven	4	4
5	(Brazil) T Monteiro	6	6

Third round
3	(Canada) B Schnur	6^{3}	4
(France) E Couacaud	7^{7}	6
(Japan) G Soeda	7^{7}	4	2
5	(Brazil) T Monteiro	6^{2}	6	1^{r}

Quarterfinals
(France) E Couacaud	6^{3}	6	4
(Japan) G Soeda	7^{7}	3	6

=== Bottom half ===
==== Section 3 ====
First round
(France) M Janvier	7^{8}	6
(Australia) M Purcell	6^{6}	4
ITF	(Northern Mariana Islands) C Sinclair	4	7	2
(Canada) V Pospisil	6	5	6
Q	(United Kingdom) L Broady	7^{8}	6
(Canada) P Polansky	6^{6}	3
(South Korea) D-h Lee	6	6
(Australia) M Banes	1	4

Second round
6	(Bosnia and Herzegovina) D Džumhur	2	7	4
(France) M Janvier	6	5	6
(Canada) V Pospisil	6	6^{8}	3
12	(South Korea) Hy Chung	1	7^{10}	6
LL	(Colombia) A Gómez	3	6	6^{5}
Q	(United Kingdom) L Broady	6	2	7^{7}
(South Korea) D-h Lee	6	4	1
4	(Tunisia) M Jaziri	2	6	6

Third round
(France) M Janvier	6	6
12	(South Korea) Hy Chung	4	2
Q	(United Kingdom) L Broady	6	5	6
4	(Tunisia) M Jaziri	3	7	4

Quarterfinals
(France) M Janvier	7	7
Q	(United Kingdom) L Broady	5	5

==== Section 4 ====
First round
(France) E Benchetrit	6^{0}	6	3
(Ecuador) E Gómez	7^{7}	4	6
WC	(Canada) L Draxl	4	5
(Belgium) R Bemelmans	6	7
Alt	(United States) JC Aragone	3	1
WC	(Canada) B Sigouin	6	6
(Netherlands) T Griekspoor	5	6	6
(Ecuador) R Quiroz	7	4	3

Second round
7	(Russia) E Donskoy	6	6
(Ecuador) E Gómez	3	4
(Belgium) R Bemelmans	4	2
10	(Chinese Taipei) J Jung	6	6
16	(Australia) M Polmans	6	6
WC	(Canada) B Sigouin	3	4
(Netherlands) T Griekspoor	6	6
2/SE	(United States) S Johnson	4	4

Third round
7	(Russia) E Donskoy	6	3	4
10	(Chinese Taipei) J Jung	4	6	6
16	(Australia) M Polmans	6	4	7
(Netherlands) T Griekspoor	4	6	5

Quarterfinals
10	(Chinese Taipei) J Jung	5	6	6
16	(Australia) M Polmans	7	4	4
