= 2015 Odlum Brown Vancouver Open =

- Date: August 17–23
- Edition: 11th (men); 14th (women)
- Category: ATP Challenger Tour; ITF Women's Circuit
- Prize money: US$100,000 (men); US$100,000 (women)
- Surface: Hard – outdoors
- Location: West Vancouver, British Columbia, Canada
- Venue: Hollyburn Country Club

Champions

Men's singles
- (Israel) Dudi Sela

Women's singles
- (United Kingdom) Johanna Konta

Men's doubles
- (Philippines) Treat Huey / (Denmark) Frederik Nielsen

Women's doubles
- (United Kingdom) Johanna Konta / (United States) Maria Sanchez
- Vancouver Open

The 2015 Odlum Brown Vancouver Open was a professional tennis tournament that took place on outdoor hard courts. It was the 11th edition, for men, and 14th edition, for women, of the tournament and part of the 2015 ATP Challenger Tour and the 2015 ITF Women's Circuit, offering totals of $100,000, for men, and $100,000, for women, in prize money. It took place in West Vancouver, British Columbia, Canada between August 17 to August 23, 2015.

== Men's singles main-draw entrants ==
=== Seeds ===
Country	Player	Rank^{1}	Seed
LTU	Ričardas Berankis	74	1
AUS	John Millman	85	2
LAT	Ernests Gulbis	87	3
BEL	Ruben Bemelmans	103	4
JPN	Go Soeda	108	5
GBR	Kyle Edmund	109	6
JPN	Taro Daniel	112	7
COL	Alejandro González	117	8

- ^{1} Rankings are as of August 10, 2015

=== Other entrants ===
The following players received wildcards into the singles main draw:

- (Latvia) Ernests Gulbis
- (United States) Dennis Novikov
- (United States) Alexander Sarkissian

The following players received entry from the qualifying draw:

- (Argentina) Guido Andreozzi
- (United Kingdom) Daniel Evans
- (France) Maxime Hamou
- (Czech Republic) Radek Štěpánek

The following players received entry as lucky losers:

- (Canada) Philip Bester
- (France) Mathias Bourgue

== Women's singles main-draw entrants ==
=== Seeds ===
Country	Player	Rank^{1}	Seed
BEL	Kirsten Flipkens	83	1
RUS	Vitalia Diatchenko	87	2
ITA	Francesca Schiavone	88	3
BEL	Yanina Wickmayer	98	4
USA	Bethanie Mattek-Sands	99	5
NED	Kiki Bertens	114	6
GBR	Johanna Konta	115	7
ROU	Patricia Maria Țig	116	8

- ^{1} Rankings are as of August 10, 2015

=== Other entrants ===
The following players received wildcards into the singles main draw:

- (United States) Samantha Crawford
- (Canada) Gabriela Dabrowski
- (United States) Vania King
- (United Kingdom) Laura Robson

The following player entered the singles main draw with a protected ranking:

- (Russia) Ksenia Pervak

The following players received entry from the qualifying draw:

- (Israel) Julia Glushko
- (Estonia) Anett Kontaveit
- (Ukraine) Kateryna Kozlova
- (China) Zhang Shuai

The following player received entry as a lucky loser:

- (Canada) Sharon Fichman

== Champions ==
=== Men's singles ===
- (Israel) Dudi Sela def. (Australia) John-Patrick Smith, 6–4, 7–5

=== Women's singles ===
- (United Kingdom) Johanna Konta def. (Belgium) Kirsten Flipkens, 6–2, 6–4

=== Men's doubles ===
- (Philippines) Treat Huey / (Denmark) Frederik Nielsen def. (India) Yuki Bhambri / (New Zealand) Michael Venus, 7–6^{(7–4)}, 6–7^{(3–7)}, [10–5]

=== Women's doubles ===
- (United Kingdom) Johanna Konta / (United States) Maria Sanchez def. (Romania) Raluca Olaru / (United States) Anna Tatishvili, 7–6^{(7–5)}, 6–4
