= 2019 Odlum Brown Vancouver Open =

- Date: 12–17 August 2019
- Edition: 14th (men); 17th (women)
- Category: ATP Challenger Tour; ITF Women's World Tennis Tour
- Prize money: $108,320 (men) $100,000 (women)
- Surface: Hard
- Location: Vancouver, Canada

Champions

Men's singles
- (Lithuania) Ričardas Berankis

Women's singles
- (United Kingdom) Heather Watson

Men's doubles
- (Sweden) Robert Lindstedt / (United Kingdom) Jonny O'Mara

Women's doubles
- (Japan) Nao Hibino / (Japan) Miyu Kato
← 2018 ·	Vancouver Open	· 2022 →

The 2019 Odlum Brown Vancouver Open was a professional tennis tournament played on outdoor hard courts. It was the fourteenth (men) and seventeenth (women) editions of the tournament which was part of the 2019 ATP Challenger Tour and the 2019 ITF Women's World Tennis Tour. It took place in Vancouver, Canada between 12 and 17 August 2019.

== Men's singles main-draw entrants ==
=== Seeds ===
Country	Player	Rank^{1}	Seed
LTU	Ričardas Berankis	77	1
USA	Steve Johnson	93	2
CAN	Brayden Schnur	98	3
TUN	Malek Jaziri	102	4
BRA	Thiago Monteiro	106	5
BIH	Damir Džumhur	109	6
RUS	Evgeny Donskoy	111	7
GER	Dominik Köpfer	122	8
LAT	Ernests Gulbis	124	9
TPE	Jason Jung	129	10
AUS	Alex Bolt	134	11
KOR	Chung Hyeon	141	12
BLR	Egor Gerasimov	146	13
~~SRB~~	~~Viktor Troicki~~	~~150~~	~~14~~
~~AUS~~	~~James Duckworth~~	~~158~~	~~15~~
AUS	Marc Polmans	168	16

- ^{1} Rankings are as of August 5, 2019.

=== Other entrants ===
The following players received wildcards into the singles main draw:

- (Canada) Liam Draxl
- (Canada) Alexis Galarneau
- (Latvia) Ernests Gulbis
- (Canada) Filip Peliwo
- (Canada) Benjamin Sigouin

The following player received entry into the singles main draw as a special exempt:

- (United States) Steve Johnson

The following player received entry into the singles main draw as an alternate:

- (United States) JC Aragone

The following players received entry into the singles main draw using their ITF World Tennis Ranking:

- (United States) Jordi Arconada
- (United States) Maxime Cressy
- (United Kingdom) Lloyd Glasspool
- (Northern Mariana Islands) Colin Sinclair
- (Netherlands) Tim van Rijthoven

The following players received entry from the qualifying draw:

- (United Kingdom) Liam Broady
- (Greece) Michail Pervolarakis

The following players received entry as lucky losers:

- (Canada) Taha Baadi
- (Colombia) Alejandro Gómez

== Women's singles main-draw entrants ==
=== Seeds ===
Country	Player	Rank^{1}	Seed
BEL	Alison Van Uytvanck	61	1
JPN	Misaki Doi	88	2
ESP	Sara Sorribes Tormo	96	3
BEL	Ysaline Bonaventure	110	4
CAN	Eugenie Bouchard	112	5
GBR	Heather Watson	113	6
USA	Varvara Lepchenko	115	7
BEL	Greet Minnen	121	8

- ^{1} Rankings are as of 5 August 2019.

=== Other entrants ===
The following players received wildcards into the singles main draw:

- (Canada) Carson Branstine
- (Canada) Leylah Annie Fernandez
- (Canada) Layne Sleeth
- (Canada) Carol Zhao

The following players received entry from the qualifying draw:

- (Australia) Lizette Cabrera
- (United States) Hanna Chang
- (United States) Ashley Kratzer
- (United States) Asia Muhammad
- (Mexico) Giuliana Olmos
- (Japan) Ena Shibahara

== Champions ==
=== Men's singles ===
- (Lithuania) Ričardas Berankis def. (Chinese Taipei) Jason Jung 6–3, 5–7, 6–4.

=== Women's singles ===
- (United Kingdom) Heather Watson def. (Spain) Sara Sorribes Tormo, 7–5, 6–4

=== Men's doubles ===
- (Sweden) Robert Lindstedt / (United Kingdom) Jonny O'Mara def. (Philippines) Treat Huey / (Canada) Adil Shamasdin 6–2, 7–5.

=== Women's doubles ===
- (Japan) Nao Hibino / (Japan) Miyu Kato def. (United Kingdom) Naomi Broady / (New Zealand) Erin Routliffe, 6–2, 6–2
