= 2015 Odlum Brown Vancouver Open – Men's doubles =

Men's doubles
- 2015 Odlum Brown Vancouver Open

Final
- Champions: (Philippines) Treat Huey (Denmark) Frederik Nielsen
- Runners-up: (India) Yuki Bhambri (New Zealand) Michael Venus
- Score: 7–6^{(7–4)}, 6–7^{(3–7)}, [10–5]

Events
Singles	men	women
Doubles	men	women
← 2014 ·	Vancouver Open	· 2017 →

Austin Krajicek and John-Patrick Smith were the defending champions, but Smith did not participate this year. Krajicek partnered with Nicholas Monroe, but lost in the quarterfinals to Yuki Bhambri and Michael Venus.

Treat Huey and Frederik Nielsen won the tournament, defeating Bhambri and Venus in the final.

== Seeds ==
1. (New Zealand) Marcus Daniell / (New Zealand) Artem Sitak (first round)
2. (United States) Austin Krajicek / (United States) Nicholas Monroe (quarterfinals)
3. (Philippines) Treat Huey / (Denmark) Frederik Nielsen (champions)
4. (Romania) Marius Copil / (Austria) Jürgen Melzer (semifinals, withdrew)

== Draw ==
=== Key ===
- Q = Qualifier
- WC = Wild card
- LL = Lucky loser
- Alt = Alternate
- SE = Special exempt
- PR = Protected ranking
- ITF = ITF entry
- JE = Junior exempt
- w/o = Walkover
- r = Retired
- d = Defaulted
- SR = Special ranking

First round
1	(New Zealand) M Daniell (New Zealand) A Sitak	6	3	[9]
(Lithuania) R Berankis (Israel) D Sela	3	6	[11]
(Australia) C Ball (Australia) M Reid	7^{9}	6
(United States) D Novikov (United States) M Seeberger	6^{7}	4
3	(Philippines) T Huey (Denmark) F Nielsen	6	6
(Japan) G Soeda (Japan) Y Uchiyama	4	1
(Argentina) G Andreozzi (South Africa) D O'Brien
(Australia) J Millman (Australia) L Saville	w/o
(Japan) T Daniel (Colombia) A González
(Uzbekistan) F Dustov (Ukraine) I Marchenko	w/o
(Italy) M Donati (Estonia) J Zopp	6^{5}	6	[9]
4	(Romania) M Copil (Austria) J Melzer	7^{7}	3	[11]
(India) Y Bhambri (New Zealand) M Venus	7^{7}	6
(Belgium) R Bemelmans (Canada) P Bester	6^{4}	3
(United Kingdom) B Klein (Australia) A Whittington	7^{7}	6^{4}	[8]
2	(United States) A Krajicek (United States) N Monroe	6^{4}	7^{7}	[10]

Quarterfinals
(Lithuania) R Berankis (Israel) D Sela	4	6	[10]
(Australia) C Ball (Australia) M Reid	6	2	[6]
3	(Philippines) T Huey (Denmark) F Nielsen	6	3	[10]
(Australia) J Millman (Australia) L Saville	0	6	[5]
(Uzbekistan) F Dustov (Ukraine) I Marchenko
4	(Romania) M Copil (Austria) J Melzer	w/o
(India) Y Bhambri (New Zealand) M Venus	6	6
2	(United States) A Krajicek (United States) N Monroe	3	2

Semifinals
(Lithuania) R Berankis (Israel) D Sela	1	5
3	(Philippines) T Huey (Denmark) F Nielsen	6	7
4	(Romania) M Copil (Austria) J Melzer
(India) Y Bhambri (New Zealand) M Venus	w/o

Final
3	(Philippines) T Huey (Denmark) F Nielsen	7^{7}	6^{3}	[10]
(India) Y Bhambri (New Zealand) M Venus	6^{4}	7^{7}	[5]
