= 2015 Odlum Brown Vancouver Open – Women's singles =

Women's singles
- 2015 Odlum Brown Vancouver Open

Final
- Champion: (United Kingdom) Johanna Konta
- Runner-up: (Belgium) Kirsten Flipkens
- Score: 6–2, 6–4

Events
Singles	men	women
Doubles	men	women
← 2014 ·	Vancouver Open	· 2017 →

Jarmila Gajdošová was the defending champion, but chose to participate at the 2015 Western & Southern Open instead.

Johanna Konta won the title, defeating Kirsten Flipkens in the final, 6–2, 6–4.

== Seeds ==
1. (Belgium) Kirsten Flipkens (final)
2. (Russia) Vitalia Diatchenko (first round, retired)
3. (Italy) Francesca Schiavone (first round)
4. (Belgium) Yanina Wickmayer (semifinals)
5. (United States) Bethanie Mattek-Sands (first round)
6. (Netherlands) Kiki Bertens (quarterfinals)
7. (United Kingdom) Johanna Konta (champion)
8. (Romania) Patricia Maria Țig (second round)

== Main draw ==
=== Key ===
- Q = Qualifier
- WC = Wild card
- LL = Lucky loser
- Alt = Alternate
- SE = Special exempt
- PR = Protected ranking
- ITF = ITF entry
- JE = Junior exempt
- w/o = Walkover
- r = Retired
- d = Defaulted
- SR = Special ranking

=== Finals ===
Semifinals
1	(Belgium) Kirsten Flipkens	6	7^{7}
(Russia) Alla Kudryavtseva	2	6^{1}
4	(Belgium) Yanina Wickmayer	4	3
7	(United Kingdom) Johanna Konta	6	6

Final
1	(Belgium) Kirsten Flipkens	2	4
7	(United Kingdom) Johanna Konta	6	6

=== Top half ===
First round
1	(Belgium) K Flipkens	6	4	6
(Spain) S Soler Espinosa	2	6	1
(Paraguay) V Cepede Royg	3	5
(Latvia) J Ostapenko	6	7
WC	(United Kingdom) L Robson	2	5
PR	(Russia) K Pervak	6	7
WC	(United States) S Crawford	3	6^{3}
6	(Netherlands) K Bertens	6	7^{7}
3	(Italy) F Schiavone	4	6	1
(Tunisia) O Jabeur	6	4	6
(Russia) A Kudryavtseva	4	7	6
(Croatia) D Vekić	6	5	3
Q	(China) S Zhang	6	4	1
Q	(Estonia) A Kontaveit	3	6	6
(Israel) S Pe'er	3	3
8	(Romania) PM Țig	6	6

Second round
1	(Belgium) K Flipkens	6	6
(Latvia) J Ostapenko	3	0
PR	(Russia) K Pervak	6	6^{3}	2
6	(Netherlands) K Bertens	2	7^{7}	6
(Tunisia) O Jabeur	3	3
(Russia) A Kudryavtseva	6	6
Q	(Estonia) A Kontaveit	3	6	6
8	(Romania) PM Țig	6	0	1

Quarterfinals
1	(Belgium) K Flipkens	6^{5}	6	7^{7}
6	(Netherlands) K Bertens	7^{7}	3	6^{3}
(Russia) A Kudryavtseva	6	6
Q	(Estonia) A Kontaveit	1	1

Semifinals
1	(Belgium) K Flipkens	6	7^{7}
(Russia) A Kudryavtseva	2	6^{1}

=== Bottom half ===
First round
5	(United States) B Mattek-Sands	2	6	0
(Japan) N Hibino	6	2	6
Q	(Ukraine) K Kozlova	6	6
(Japan) R Ozaki	3	3
LL	(Canada) S Fichman	4	4
Q	(Israel) J Glushko	6	6
WC	(Canada) G Dabrowski	1	6	0
4	(Belgium) Y Wickmayer	6	1	6
7	(United Kingdom) J Konta	6	6
(France) P Parmentier	3	1
(United States) A Tatishvili	6	6
WC	(United States) V King	3	2
(Ukraine) A Kalinina	6^{4}	1
(Russia) D Kasatkina	7^{7}	6
(Croatia) P Martić	6	5
2	(Russia) V Diatchenko	2	2^{r}

Second round
(Japan) N Hibino	6	7^{7}
Q	(Ukraine) K Kozlova	3	6^{2}
Q	(Israel) J Glushko	3	3
4	(Belgium) Y Wickmayer	6	6
7	(United Kingdom) J Konta	2	6	6
(United States) A Tatishvili	6	3	3
(Russia) D Kasatkina	6^{3}	1
(Croatia) P Martić	7^{7}	6

Quarterfinals
(Japan) N Hibino	3	4
4	(Belgium) Y Wickmayer	6	6
7	(United Kingdom) J Konta	7^{7}	6^{3}	6
(Croatia) P Martić	6^{5}	7^{7}	3

Semifinals
4	(Belgium) Y Wickmayer	4	3
7	(United Kingdom) J Konta	6	6
