= 2019 Odlum Brown Vancouver Open – Women's doubles =

Women's doubles
- 2019 Odlum Brown Vancouver Open

Final
- Champions: (Japan) Nao Hibino (Japan) Miyu Kato
- Runners-up: (United Kingdom) Naomi Broady (New Zealand) Erin Routliffe
- Score: 6–2, 6–2

Events
Singles	men	women
Doubles	men	women
- Odlum Brown Vancouver Open

Desirae Krawczyk and Giuliana Olmos were the defending champions, but Krawczyk chose not to participate. Olmos partnered alongside Alexa Guarachi but lost in the first round to Harriet Dart and Heather Watson.

Nao Hibino and Miyu Kato won the title, defeating Naomi Broady and Erin Routliffe in the final, 6–2, 6–2.

== Seeds ==
1. (Japan) Eri Hozumi / (Japan) Makoto Ninomiya (quarterfinals)
2. (Japan) Nao Hibino / (Japan) Miyu Kato (champions)
3. (Chile) Alexa Guarachi / (Mexico) Giuliana Olmos (first round)
4. (Belgium) Greet Minnen / (Belgium) Alison Van Uytvanck (semifinals, withdrew)

== Draw ==
Key

- Q = Qualifier
- WC = Wild card
- LL = Lucky loser
- Alt = Alternate
- ITF = ITF entry
- PR = Protected ranking
- SR = Special ranking
- SE = Special exempt
- JE = Junior exempt
- JR = Junior Accelerator Programme entrant
- CO = College Accelerator Programme entrant
- NG = Next Gen Accelerator Program entrant
- w/o = Walkover
- r = Retired
- d = Defaulted

=== Draw ===
First round
1	(Japan) E Hozumi (Japan) M Ninomiya	6	6
Alt	(Australia) M Inglis (Australia) K McPhee	1	4
(Serbia) J Jakšić (Japan) H Kuwata	0	1
(United Kingdom) N Broady (New Zealand) E Routliffe	6	6
4	(Belgium) G Minnen (Belgium) A Van Uytvanck	3	6	[10]
WC	(Canada) C Branstine (Canada) LA Fernandez	6	1	[8]
(Belgium) Y Bonaventure (United States) M Sanchez	w/o
(United States) V Lepchenko (Australia) Ar Rodionova
(Japan) M Doi (Japan) K Nara	2	4
(Canada) S Fichman (Australia) S Sanders	6	6
(United Kingdom) H Dart (United Kingdom) H Watson	6	6
3	(Chile) A Guarachi (Mexico) G Olmos	2	2
(United States) M Manasse (Japan) E Shibahara	6^{4}	5
(United States) N Gibbs (United States) A Muhammad	7^{7}	7
WC	(Canada) S Fung (Canada) A Vagramov	5	4
2	(Japan) N Hibino (Japan) M Kato	7	6

Quarterfinals
1	(Japan) E Hozumi (Japan) M Ninomiya	1	6^{6}
(United Kingdom) N Broady (New Zealand) E Routliffe	6	7^{8}
4	(Belgium) G Minnen (Belgium) A Van Uytvanck	w/o
(Belgium) Y Bonaventure (United States) M Sanchez
(Canada) S Fichman (Australia) S Sanders	w/o
(United Kingdom) H Dart (United Kingdom) H Watson
(United States) N Gibbs (United States) A Muhammad	6	6^{0}	[8]
2	(Japan) N Hibino (Japan) M Kato	4	7^{7}	[10]

Semifinals
(United Kingdom) N Broady (New Zealand) E Routliffe	w/o
4	(Belgium) G Minnen (Belgium) A Van Uytvanck
(Canada) S Fichman (Australia) S Sanders	6	3	[7]
2	(Japan) N Hibino (Japan) M Kato	3	6	[10]

Final
(United Kingdom) N Broady (New Zealand) E Routliffe	2	2
2	(Japan) N Hibino (Japan) M Kato	6	6
