= 2019 Odlum Brown Vancouver Open – Women's singles =

Women's singles
- 2019 Odlum Brown Vancouver Open

Final
- Champion: (United Kingdom) Heather Watson
- Runner-up: (Spain) Sara Sorribes Tormo
- Score: 7–5, 6–4

Events
Singles	men	women
Doubles	men	women
- Odlum Brown Vancouver Open

Misaki Doi was the defending champion, but lost to Priscilla Hon in the first round.

Heather Watson won the title, defeating Sara Sorribes Tormo in the final, 7–5, 6–4.

== Seeds ==
1. (Belgium) Alison Van Uytvanck (first round, retired)
2. (Japan) Misaki Doi (first round)
3. (Spain) Sara Sorribes Tormo (final)
4. (Belgium) Ysaline Bonaventure (first round)
5. (Canada) Eugenie Bouchard (first round)
6. (United Kingdom) Heather Watson (champion)
7. (United States) Varvara Lepchenko (first round)
8. (Belgium) Greet Minnen (first round)

== Draw ==
Key

- Q = Qualifier
- WC = Wild card
- LL = Lucky loser
- Alt = Alternate
- ITF = ITF entry
- PR = Protected ranking
- SR = Special ranking
- SE = Special exempt
- JE = Junior exempt
- JR = Junior Accelerator Programme entrant
- CO = College Accelerator Programme entrant
- NG = Next Gen Accelerator Program entrant
- w/o = Walkover
- r = Retired
- d = Defaulted

=== Finals ===
Semifinals
6	(United Kingdom) Heather Watson	7^{7}	6
WC	(Canada) Leylah Annie Fernandez	6^{4}	2
3	(Spain) Sara Sorribes Tormo	6	6
(Hungary) Tímea Babos	4	0

Final
6	(United Kingdom) Heather Watson	7	6
3	(Spain) Sara Sorribes Tormo	5	4

=== Top half ===
First round
1	(Belgium) A Van Uytvanck	2	2^{r}
(Australia) M Inglis	6	2
WC	(Canada) C Zhao	2	4
Q	(United States) A Muhammad	6	6
(Slovakia) M Rybáriková	3	3
(Japan) K Nara	6	6
WC	(Canada) C Branstine	4	3
6	(United Kingdom) H Watson	6	6
4	(Belgium) Y Bonaventure	7^{7}	4	1
(Australia) Ar Rodionova	6^{5}	6	6
(Russia) L Samsonova	5	1
(Japan) N Hibino	7	6
Q	(United States) A Kratzer	6	6
(Serbia) J Jakšić	1	4
WC	(Canada) LA Fernandez	6	7^{7}
7	(United States) V Lepchenko	3	6^{1}

Second round
(Australia) M Inglis	2	7^{7}	6
Q	(United States) A Muhammad	6	6^{3}	4
(Japan) K Nara	3	1
6	(United Kingdom) H Watson	6	6
(Australia) Ar Rodionova	4	6	4
(Japan) N Hibino	6	3	6
Q	(United States) A Kratzer	2	0^{r}
WC	(Canada) LA Fernandez	6	4

Quarterfinals
(Australia) M Inglis	3	2
6	(United Kingdom) H Watson	6	6
(Japan) N Hibino	3	4
WC	(Canada) LA Fernandez	6	6

Semifinals
6	(United Kingdom) H Watson	7^{7}	6
WC	(Canada) LA Fernandez	6^{4}	2

=== Bottom half ===
First round
8	(Belgium) G Minnen	3	4
Q	(United States) H Chang	6	6
(United States) N Gibbs	4	6	3
Q	(Japan) E Shibahara	6	4	6
(Paraguay) V Cepede Royg	4
WC	(Canada) L Sleeth	2^{r}
(Australia) K McPhee	1	2
3	(Spain) S Sorribes Tormo	6	6
5	(Canada) E Bouchard	6	3	1
(Hungary) T Babos	3	6	6
Q	(Australia) L Cabrera	6	4	2
(United Kingdom) H Dart	2	6	6
Q	(Mexico) G Olmos	1	0
(China) Xiy Wang	6	6
(Australia) P Hon	6	6
2	(Japan) M Doi	4	3

Second round
Q	(United States) H Chang	1	3
Q	(Japan) E Shibahara	6	6
(Paraguay) V Cepede Royg	6	4	6^{3}
3	(Spain) S Sorribes Tormo	2	6	7^{7}
(Hungary) T Babos	7	6
(United Kingdom) H Dart	5	2
(China) Xiy Wang	6^{5}	6	6^{3}
(Australia) P Hon	7^{7}	3	7^{7}

Quarterfinals
Q	(Japan) E Shibahara	1	3
3	(Spain) S Sorribes Tormo	6	6
(Hungary) T Babos	6	6
(Australia) P Hon	2	3

Semifinals
3	(Spain) S Sorribes Tormo	6	6
(Hungary) T Babos	4	0

== See also ==
- 2019 Odlum Brown Vancouver Open
- Odlum Brown Vancouver Open
- 2019 ITF Women's World Tennis Tour
