= 2017 Odlum Brown Vancouver Open – Men's singles =

Men's singles
- 2017 Odlum Brown Vancouver Open

Final
- Champion: (Germany) Cedrik-Marcel Stebe
- Runner-up: (Australia) Jordan Thompson
- Score: 6–0, 6–1

Events
Singles	men	women
Doubles	men	women
- Vancouver Open

Dudi Sela was the defending champion but lost in the second round to Liam Broady.

Cedrik-Marcel Stebe won the title after defeating Jordan Thompson 6–0, 6–1 in the final.

== Seeds ==
1. (Israel) Dudi Sela (second round)
2. (Australia) Jordan Thompson (final)
3. (Romania) Marius Copil (first round)
4. (Slovakia) Norbert Gombos (first round)
5. (Switzerland) Henri Laaksonen (first round, retired)
6. (Japan) Taro Daniel (second round)
7. (Belgium) Ruben Bemelmans (second round)
8. (United States) Tennys Sandgren (second round)

== Draw ==
Key

- Q = Qualifier
- WC = Wild card
- LL = Lucky loser
- Alt = Alternate
- ITF = ITF entry
- PR = Protected ranking
- SR = Special ranking
- SE = Special exempt
- JE = Junior exempt
- JR = Junior Accelerator Programme entrant
- CO = College Accelerator Programme entrant
- NG = Next Gen Accelerator Program entrant
- w/o = Walkover
- r = Retired
- d = Defaulted

=== Finals ===
Semifinals
(Belgium) Joris De Loore	2	4
(Germany) Cedrik-Marcel Stebe	6	6
(Italy) Stefano Napolitano	0	1
2	(Australia) Jordan Thompson	6	6

Final
(Germany) Cedrik-Marcel Stebe	6	6
2	(Australia) Jordan Thompson	0	1

=== Top half ===
First round
1	(Israel) D Sela	7^{7}	6
WC	(Canada) F Peliwo	6^{4}	2
LL	(Australia) M Polmans	6	3	4
SE	(United Kingdom) L Broady	1	6	6
(France) Q Halys	7^{7}	6
LL	(United States) R Shane	6^{2}	3
(Belgium) J De Loore	6	0
5	(Switzerland) H Laaksonen	3	1^{r}
3	(Romania) M Copil	5	5
(Australia) J Millman	7	7
(Germany) C-M Stebe	6	6
Q	(United States) T-S Kwiatkowski	4	4
Q	(Zimbabwe) T Garanganga	3	2
SE	(United States) T Fritz	6	6
(South Korea) D-h Lee	5	6^{5}
8	(United States) T Sandgren	7	7^{7}

Second round
1	(Israel) D Sela	6^{2}	6^{10}
SE	(United Kingdom) L Broady	7^{7}	7^{12}
(France) Q Halys	3	6	3
(Belgium) J De Loore	6	4	6
(Australia) J Millman	6	5	5
(Germany) C-M Stebe	4	7	7
SE	(United States) T Fritz	6	6
8	(United States) T Sandgren	2	2

Quarterfinals
SE	(United Kingdom) L Broady	6^{8}	6^{4}
(Belgium) J De Loore	7^{10}	7^{7}
(Germany) C-M Stebe	4	7^{7}	6
SE	(United States) T Fritz	6	6^{5}	2

Semifinals
(Belgium) J De Loore	2	4
(Germany) C-M Stebe	6	6

=== Bottom half ===
First round
7	(Belgium) R Bemelmans	7^{8}	6
WC	(Canada) P Bester	6^{6}	4
LL	(United States) JC Aragone	1	5
(Italy) S Napolitano	6	7
(Germany) Y Hanfmann	5	3
(Austria) S Ofner	7	6
Q	(South Africa) L Harris	7	6
4	(Slovakia) N Gombos	5	2
6	(Japan) T Daniel	7	6
(United States) N Rubin	5	4
(France) G Sakharov	4	6^{2}
WC	(Canada) B Schnur	6	7^{7}
Q	(Australia) M Purcell	7	6
(France) B Bonzi	5	4
WC	(Canada) B Sigouin	0	1
2	(Australia) J Thompson	6	6

Second round
7	(Belgium) R Bemelmans	5	6	4
(Italy) S Napolitano	7	3	6
(Austria) S Ofner	4	4
Q	(South Africa) L Harris	6	6
6	(Japan) T Daniel	6	2	5
WC	(Canada) B Schnur	2	6	7
Q	(Australia) M Purcell	1	3
2	(Australia) J Thompson	6	6

Quarterfinals
(Italy) S Napolitano	4	6	6
Q	(South Africa) L Harris	6	3	3
WC	(Canada) B Schnur	6	4	1
2	(Australia) J Thompson	4	6	6

Semifinals
(Italy) S Napolitano	0	1
2	(Australia) J Thompson	6	6
