= Johanna Konta =

British tennis player (born 1991)

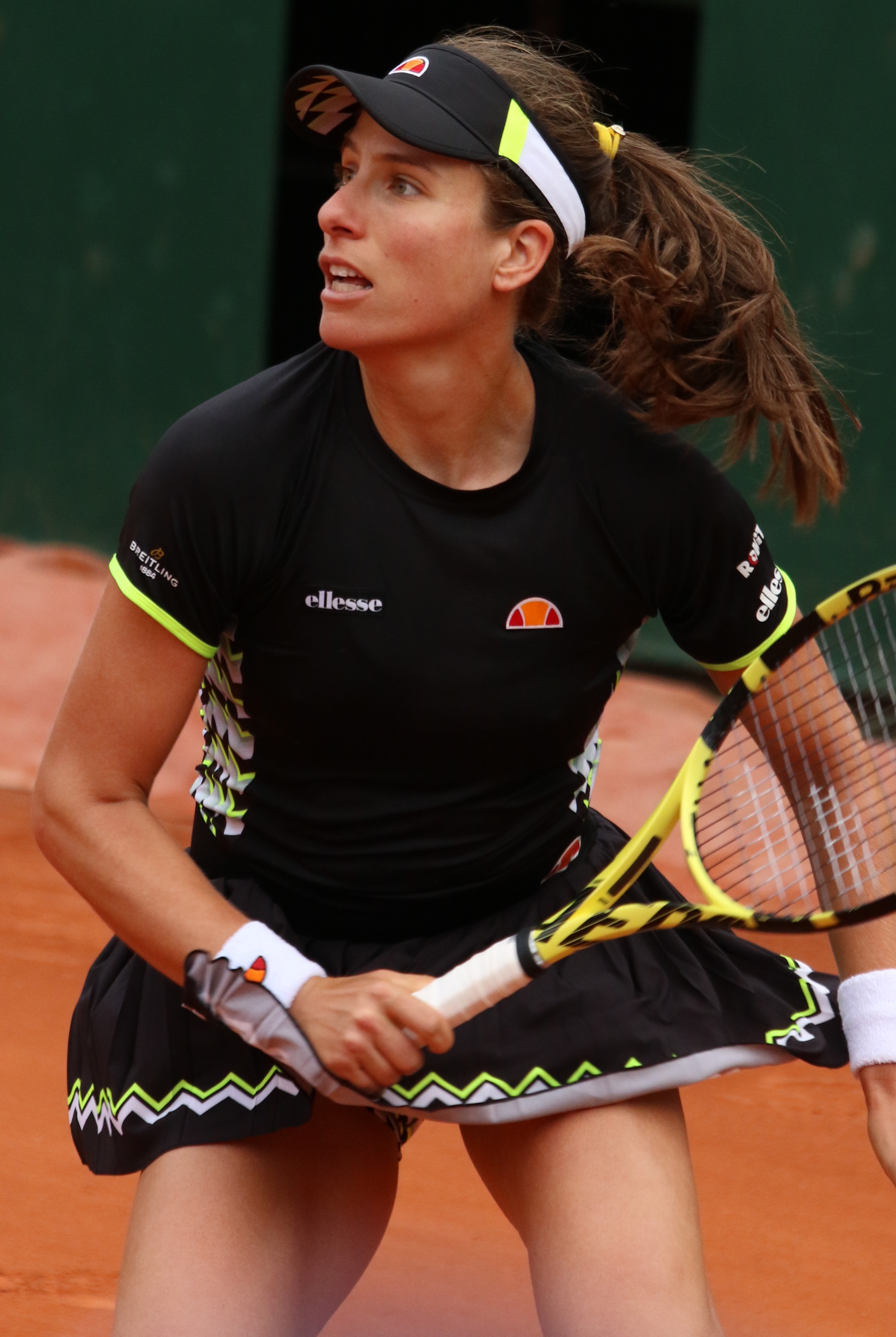
- Konta at the 2019 French Open
- Country (sports): Great Britain (2012–2021); Australia (2008–12)
- Residence: Eastbourne, England, UK
- Born: 17 May 1991 (age 35) Sydney, New South Wales, Australia
- Height: 1.80 m (5 ft 11 in)
- Turned pro: 2008
- Retired: 1 December 2021
- Plays: Right-handed (two-handed backhand)
- Coach: Esteban Carril (2014–2016); José Manuel García (2015–2016); Wim Fissette (2016–2017); Michael Joyce (2017–2018); Dimitri Zavialoff (2018–2020); Thomas Högstedt (2020–2021)
- Prize money: US$ 10,008,175

Singles
- Career record: 395–243
- Career titles: 4
- Highest ranking: No. 4 (17 July 2017)

Grand Slam singles results
- Australian Open: SF (2016)
- French Open: SF (2019)
- Wimbledon: SF (2017)
- US Open: QF (2019)

Other tournaments
- Olympic Games: QF (2016)

Doubles
- Career record: 80–80
- Career titles: 0
- Highest ranking: No. 88 (1 August 2016)

Grand Slam doubles results
- Australian Open: 2R (2016)
- French Open: 1R (2016, 2018)
- Wimbledon: 3R (2016)

Other doubles tournaments
- Olympic Games: 2R (2016)

Grand Slam mixed doubles results
- French Open: 2R (2018)
- Wimbledon: 2R (2013, 2014, 2015)

Other mixed doubles tournaments
- Olympic Games: 1R (2016)

Team competitions
- Fed Cup: 20–10

Johanna Konta (born 17 May 1991) is a British-Australian former professional tennis player. Konta won four singles titles on the WTA Tour, along with eleven titles in singles and four in doubles on the ITF Women's Circuit. She was British No. 1 and reached a career-high singles ranking of world No. 4 on 17 July 2017. She reached the semifinals of the Australian Open, Wimbledon and the French Open.

Born to Hungarian parents in Sydney, Australia, Konta moved to England when she was 14. She has Hungarian, Australian and British citizenship. She switched her sporting allegiance from Australia to Great Britain after she became a British citizen in May 2012.

Konta achieved a steep rise in her ranking by the WTA from the spring of 2015 to late 2016, climbing from 150th to inside the world's top 10, becoming the first Briton to be ranked amongst the WTA's top ten since Jo Durie was ranked fifth over 30 years prior. This period included her best major result up to that time, the semifinals of the 2016 Australian Open, a quarterfinal appearance at the Rio Summer Olympics and her maiden WTA Tour title in Stanford. In 2017, she won the Miami Open and reached the semifinals at Wimbledon. Konta had another successful season in 2019, reaching the semifinals at the French Open and the quarterfinals at Wimbledon and the US Open. Konta retired on 1 December 2021, after struggling with a chronic injury to her right knee, which led to her ranking dropping outside the top 100.

== Personal life ==
Johanna Konta was born in Sydney, Australia, to Hungarian parents: Gábor, a hotel manager, and Gabriella, a dentist. Her parents had emigrated separately from Hungary and met in Australia. One of Konta's grandfathers, Tamás Kertész (1929–1989), played football for Ferencvárosi TC; he won two international caps for Hungary in the 1950s and later coached the Ghana national team. Konta has a half sister, Eva Mumford, from her father's previous marriage. Her sister is married to former Australian rules football player Shane Mumford.

Konta's childhood was spent in Collaroy on Sydney's Northern Beaches, where she was introduced to tennis at an after-school programme at the age of eight. When she was 14, she attended the Sánchez-Casal Tennis Academy in Barcelona for 15 months, during which time her parents settled in Eastbourne, England.

Konta became a British citizen in May 2012 and concurrently switched her sporting allegiance from Australia to Great Britain. When her nationality became the subject of debate at the 2016 Australian Open after she was labelled a Plastic Brit, Konta said it was "a compliment for you guys to be interested in my Australian roots", but that she was "very pleased to be representing Great Britain ... where I grew up essentially". Konta has three passports – British, Australian and Hungarian.

Konta lives in East Sussex, where her applications to build a home in the protected Ashdown Forest have proved controversial.

Two weeks after her retirement from professional tennis, Konta announced on Twitter that she had married her long-term boyfriend Jackson Wade. The wedding took place on 11 December 2021, and on 12 September 2022, she announced the birth of her daughter on her social accounts.

== Career ==
=== 2008: First ITF Circuit title ===
Konta won her first ITF singles title at a $10k tournament in Mostar, Bosnia and Herzegovina shortly before her 17th birthday in May 2008.

=== 2009: First 25k title ===
Konta achieved a significant breakthrough at a 25k tournament in Sutton, England, in February 2009. Entering as a wildcard, she defeated the top seed, Corinna Dentoni, who was ranked 153 at the time, and two other top 250 players to reach the final where she lost in three sets to Katie O'Brien. Konta backed this performance up by winning the 25k Waterloo Challenger in Ontario in June, over Heidi El Tabakh.

Konta then went through a difficult time in the second half of the year, losing her first match in eight of the nine tournaments entered, six of these losses going to three sets. However, with the help of the earlier results, she rose from 668 to 360 in the WTA rankings during the year.

=== 2010: Maiden 50k title ===
Konta regained some form at the start of 2010. In May, she reached the quarterfinal of the 50k tournament at Indian Harbour Beach, Florida. The following week, she took the title on the green clay courts of Raleigh, North Carolina, another 50k tournament, where, the day before her 19th birthday, she defeated Lindsay Lee-Waters in the final.

Highlights later in the year included another 50k quarterfinal appearance, two semifinal appearances in 25k tournaments and her second ITF Circuit singles title of the year at a 10k event in Westende, Belgium, where, in the final, she defeated Nicky Van Dyck for the loss of just one game. Konta also played her first WTA Tour event when she entered the qualifying for Copenhagen winning a match, before exiting the event.

=== 2011: Drop in ranking ===
In April 2011, she lost in three sets in the qualifying draw of Charleston to Sania Mirza. She also fell in qualifying at Fes and Strasbourg. She reached the main draw of a WTA Tour event for the first time when she qualified at Copenhagen in June, falling in the first round to fourth seed Lucie Šafářová, who was ranked 38 at the time, in a match that lasted over two and a half hours.

Konta won her fifth ITF singles title at the GB Pro-Series event in Woking in July. In the final against Laura Robson, Konta was a set up when her opponent retired.

After a patchy couple of months interrupted by injury, Konta got back to her winning ways in Madrid, beating Lucy Brown in the final. However, her year ended during a second meeting with Robson in the first round at Barnstaple in October, with Konta having to retire this time. She slipped from 248 to 305 in the world rankings over the course of the season, and showed an improvement of only 55 places over the previous two years.

=== 2012: First match wins in WTA Tour and major events ===
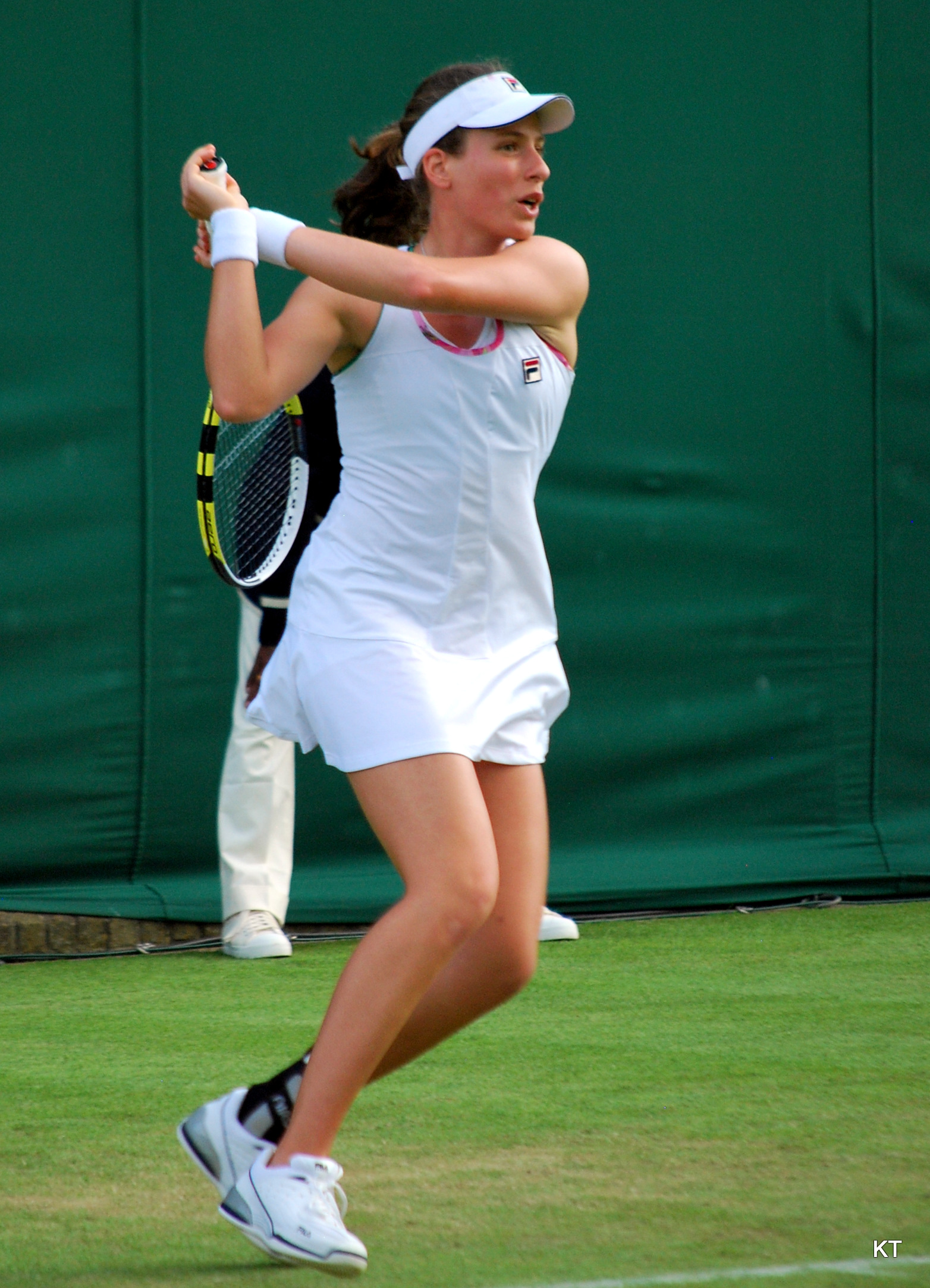
Konta during her first-round match at the 2012 Wimbledon Championships

Konta achieved some welcome results in the first half of 2012, including a 25k title at Rancho Mirage in February. She then qualified for the WTA Tour event in Copenhagen for the second successive year, recording her first-match win in a full tour main draw over seventh seed Ksenia Pervak (then ranked 38) in the opening round, before losing to Petra Martić at the next stage. By the end of April, Konta had risen nearly 100 places to No. 211 in the rankings.

Having been granted British citizenship in May, Konta received a main-draw wildcard to Wimbledon; she faced 28th seed Christina McHale in the opening round, being beaten 10–8 in the deciding set.

A $50k final appearance at Lexington in July helped to maintain momentum, and the following month Konta qualified for the US Open, bridging a gap of almost 150 places in the rankings to upset world No. 59, Tímea Babos, in the first round, saving ten set points in the second set as she recorded her first career win at major-level. In the second round, Konta let a 5–2 final set lead slip against Olga Govortsova and lost. This run propelled her into the world's top 150 for the first time in her career, slipping a few places to end the year with a ranking of 153.

=== 2013: First 100k title ===
At the Australian Open, Konta failed to build on her form from the US Open, losing in the second qualifying round to Zhou Yimiao of China, in three sets.

In February, Konta made her Fed Cup debut for Great Britain in Europe/Africa Zone Group 1 Pool B. Konta and Laura Robson won their doubles match as Britain opened with a whitewash against Bosnia and Herzegovina. Konta was then rested as Britain beat Portugal, before teaming up again with Robson in a losing doubles effort against Hungary, though Britain ultimately won this tie 2–1.

In April, Konta played in the Fed Cup World Group II play-off against Argentina. Konta was initially nominated to represent Britain in two of the singles rubbers. However, after losing her opening match against Paula Ormaechea, Great Britain captain Judy Murray decided that Elena Baltacha would replace Konta in the Sunday reverse singles.

Konta's next tournament was the Portugal Open in Oeiras, where she beat top-100 player Yulia Putintseva in the first qualifying round but was then forced to retire in the second qualifying round against Stéphanie Foretz Gacon. Konta also reached the second qualifying round at the French Open, losing to Galina Voskoboeva in three sets.

In June, Konta entered the Nottingham Trophy, a 75k tournament, reaching the semifinals after victories over An-Sophie Mestach, fifth seed Misaki Doi and Alison Riske. In the semifinals, Konta lost a tough battle against third seed Karolína Plíšková, going down in three sets. Following the event, she was handed a wildcard for the Birmingham Classic. In the first round, Konta defeated qualifier Kurumi Nara to set up a meeting with French player Kristina Mladenovic, the 12th seed at the tournament, who beat her in straight sets.

Konta also received a wildcard for Wimbledon, where she was drawn against 16th seed Jelena Janković in the first round. She lost in straight sets against the Serbian former world-number-one.

Following Wimbledon, Konta started her build-up to the US Open by winning a 25k event in Winnipeg, Manitoba, where she defeated fellow British player Samantha Murray in the final. She then kept up her form by winning the 100k Vancouver Open where she defeated Sharon Fichman in the final, after eliminating top seed and world No. 41, Hsieh Su-wei, along the way. This propelled Konta to a then career-high ranking of 115.

At the Guangzhou International Open, Konta won two rounds of qualifying to reach the main draw. In the first round, she beat fellow qualifier Richèl Hogenkamp in straight sets, before upsetting fourth seed and world No. 38, Peng Shuai, equaling her best career-win in terms of ranking to this point. However, her run was stopped in the quarterfinals, losing to wildcard entrant Zhang Shuai in straight sets. A week later, at the Ningbo International Open, Konta made the quarterfinals again, but was forced to retire in her match against Johanna Larsson, suffering from an abdominal strain.

She officially became the British No. 2 behind Laura Robson, after Heather Watson failed to defend her title in Osaka and ended the year ranked 112.

=== 2014: Top 100 ===
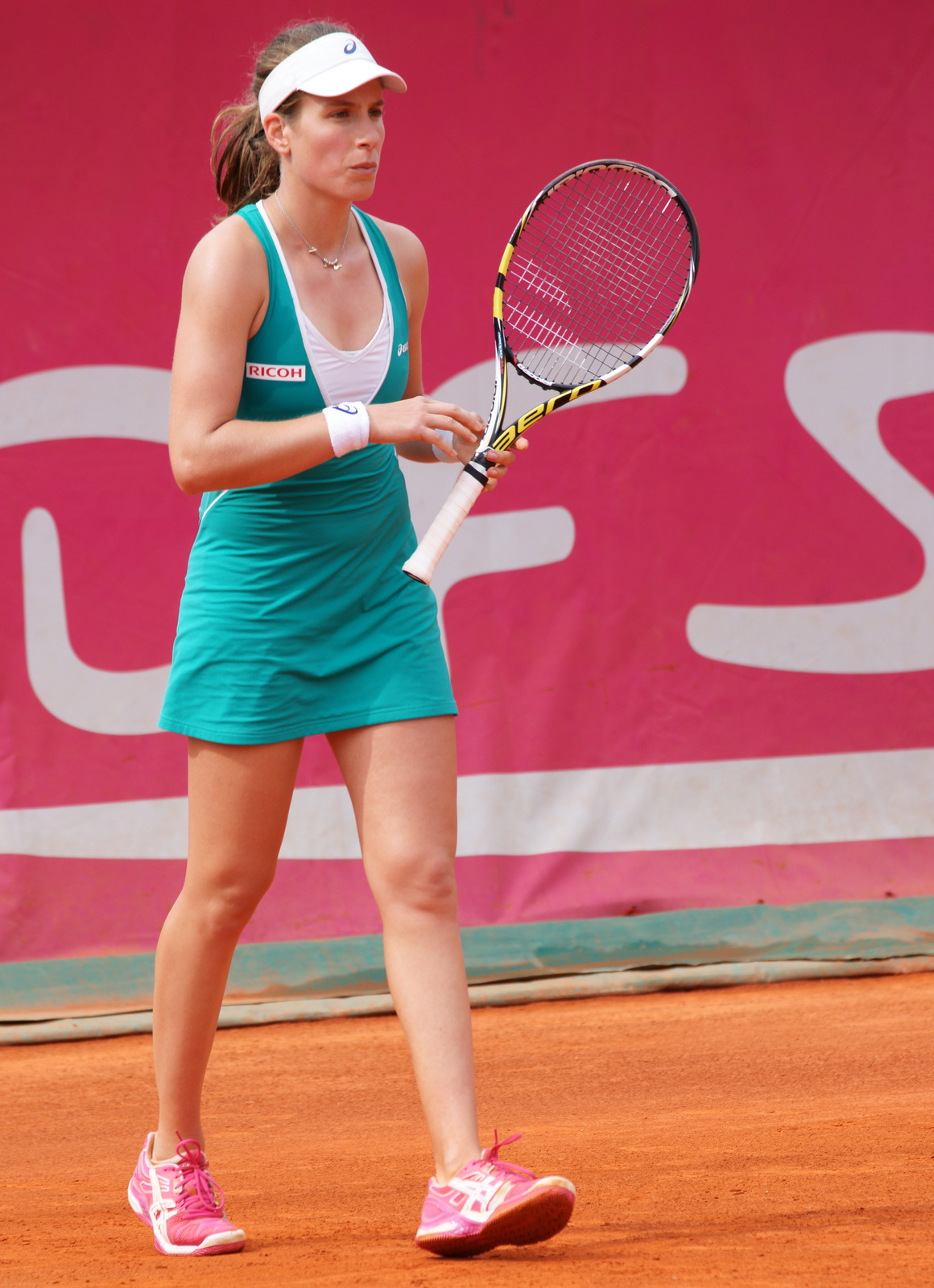
Konta at the 2014 Open de Cagnes-sur-Mer.

Konta began 2014 at the Shenzhen Open, losing to 15-year-old wildcard Xu Shilin in the first qualifying round. Together with her Austrian partner Patricia Mayr-Achleitner, she reached the semifinals in doubles, losing to the Ukrainian sisters Lyudmyla and Nadiia Kichenok, in straight sets. The following week, seeded third in Australian Open qualifying, Konta won her first match against Grace Min, but lost for the second year in succession in the second qualifying round, in straight sets to Ukrainian Olga Savchuk.

After retiring in her first-round match at a 25k event in Sunderland and losing in qualifying for the Open GdF Suez in Paris, Konta helped Great Britain to a 2–1 win over Latvia in their first round-robin match at the Fed Cup as she battled to victory over Diāna Marcinkēviča. However, she later lost singles rubbers to Romania's world No. 10, Simona Halep, and Hungary's Tímea Babos as Britain were eliminated at the pool stage.

In May, Konta reached the final qualifying round of Roland Garros for the first time, defeating Sachia Vickery, and Paula Kania, before losing to Yuliya Beygelzimer.

Konta then moved into the grass-court season by playing at the Birmingham Classic as a wildcard player. She beat 14th seed Kurumi Nara in straight sets, before losing to Aleksandra Wozniak in the second round.

Konta was awarded another wildcard to compete at the Eastbourne International, where she defeated 2013 Wimbledon junior champion Belinda Bencic, in straight sets. This set up a meeting with world No. 42, Camila Giorgi, who had stunned fourth seed Victoria Azarenka in the first round. Despite holding a match point at 5–4 up in the final set, Konta lost to the Italian. Nevertheless, her first-round success was enough to propel Konta into the top 100 as she reached a career-high of 89 in July, before falling back as she failed to replenish the ranking points won from her successes in the second half of the previous year.

Konta gained direct entry into the Wimbledon main draw, losing a tight three-set match to Peng Shuai in the first round.

Konta's next tournament was the İstanbul Cup, where she won through qualifying as the top seed. She was again drawn with Kurumi Nara in the first round, losing to the sixth-seeded Japanese in straight sets. She then moved across to North America to play the Connecticut Open; she also encountered a recent opponent here as she faced top seed Peng Shuai in the second qualifying round and was eliminated.

Her ranking gave her a second consecutive direct entry to a major main draw as she played the US Open, but she suffered a 'wasted opportunity' as she was beaten in the opening round by Shahar Pe'er.

Konta then suffered opening-round defeats at Quebec City, and in the qualifying in Luxembourg. She also played on the ITF Circuit, reaching the semifinals at Albuquerque and the second round at Nantes. She ended the year ranked 150.

=== 2015: US Open run and top 50 ===
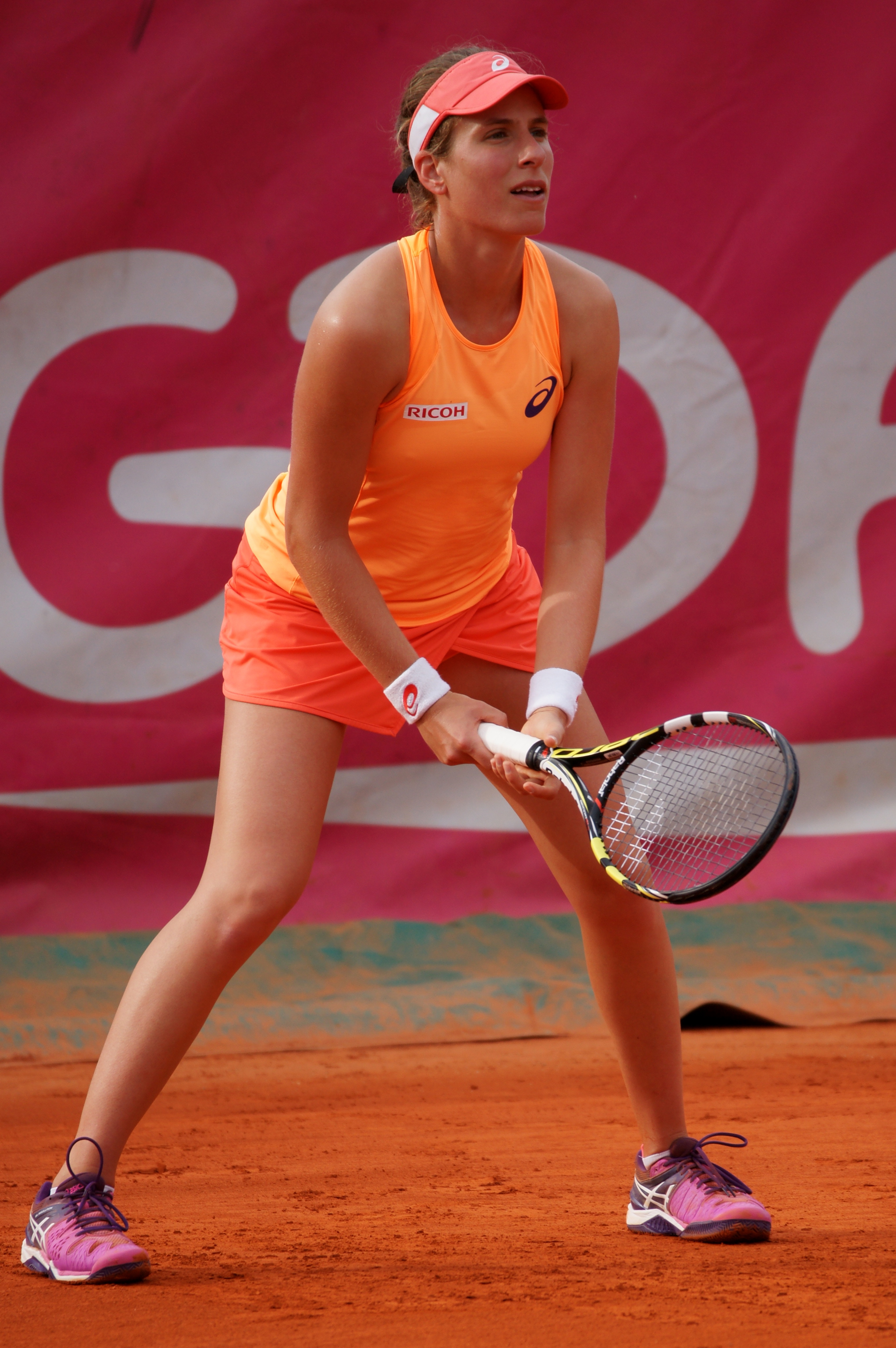
Konta at the 2015 Open de Cagnes-sur-Mer

Konta began the year by entering the qualifying of the WTA Tour events at Shenzhen and Sydney, but did not manage to progress to either of the main draws. She was also eliminated in qualifying at the Australian Open. Konta returned to Europe to join up with the British team for the Fed Cup Euro/Africa Zone Group I. She went 2–2 in singles play as Britain topped their round-robin pool, before losing a play-off to Belarus. In the play-off, Konta suffered a heavy defeat against Olga Govortsova, a match that team captain Judy Murray said 'was a catalyst for change' for Konta's success in the later part of the season.

Her sole WTA Tour event between the Australian and French Opens was at Indian Wells, where she again entered the qualifying competition, winning her opening match against tenth seed Misaki Doi, but being beaten in the final round of qualifying by Kateryna Kozlova. During this period she focused instead on the ITF Circuit, winning her first-round match in each tournament she entered, reaching three quarterfinals, one semifinal and the final of the event in Jackson, Mississippi (lost to Anhelina Kalinina).

Konta made her debut in the main draw at the French Open against Denisa Allertová after she won her way through qualifying without losing a set. Konta narrowly lost to Allertová. Konta then returned to the UK, where she was granted wildcards to the WTA Tour grass-court events in Nottingham, Birmingham and Eastbourne. At Nottingham, Konta recorded her first top 100 win of 2015 in the opening round as she beat world No. 59 and seventh seed for the event, Magdaléna Rybáriková. Konta would also beat Monica Puig before exiting in the quarterfinals to eventual tournament runner-up Monica Niculescu. Konta then played the WTA Premier event in Birmingham. She beat Jarmila Gajdošová in the first round before running into sixth seed Karolína Plíšková; Konta took the opening set off Plíšková, then ranked 13 in the world, but would eventually lose in three sets in a match played over two days. Konta's conqueror ended the tournament as the runner-up for the second week in a row.

Konta's next event was in her hometown of Eastbourne. In the opening round, she upset Zarina Diyas, before claiming a 'major scalp' by beating world No. 8 and recent Grand Slam semifinalist, Ekaterina Makarova, who was the fourth seed for the event, in the second round. Konta continued her run by beating 14th seed Garbiñe Muguruza, before losing to Belinda Bencic in a three-set quarterfinal. Bencic became the third consecutive player to beat Konta en route to the final of an event, as the rising Swiss star won the Eastbourne title.

The draw for Wimbledon paired Konta, who entered with a wildcard, with former champion Maria Sharapova. The match was scheduled for Centre Court, with Sharapova winning efficiently. After Wimbledon, Konta returned to action at the ITF event in Granby, Quebec; she entered as the top seed, and took the title without dropping a set. Konta's next event saw her reclaim the Vancouver singles crown, beating Kirsten Flipkens in the final, and also secure the doubles title with Maria Sanchez.

The Vancouver singles victory moved Konta back into the world top-100 players ahead of the US Open, which she entered at the qualifying stage as the third seed. She progressed to the main draw with wins against Réka Luca Jani, Naomi Osaka and Tamira Paszek. Prior to this, Konta had won just one major main-draw match in her career, but now added victories over Louisa Chirico, ninth seed Muguruza, and 18th seed Andrea Petkovic, extending her winning streak to 16 matches and setting up a last-16 meeting with two-time Wimbledon champion Petra Kvitová. The match against Muguruza lasted 3 hours and 23 minutes, the longest women's match at the US Open since the tie-break was introduced in 1970. It was also Konta's second top-ten win, and increased her head-to-head record against the Spaniard to 2–0. Czech fifth seed Kvitová ended Konta's run, winning in two tight sets. The points accrued during the North American swing lifted Konta to a new career-high singles ranking of world No. 58.

Konta's first event after the US Open was the Wuhan Open, a Premier-5 event, the second highest level on the WTA Tour. Having won through qualifying, Konta was drawn against Andrea Petkovic in the opening round, a rematch of their New York meeting. She won once again to advance to a second-round encounter with major champion and former world No. 1, Victoria Azarenka, who retired, after losing the first set. In the third round, Konta faced top seed and world No. 2, Simona Halep, who came into the match leading the WTA list in hardcourt victories. Halep established a 5–1 lead in the deciding set, only for Konta to take six consecutive games as she came back to win. She exited in the quarterfinals after a three-set battle with Venus Williams, who would go on to win the tournament. Konta's run in Wuhan saw her break into the top 50 for the first time, as her ranking reached another new career high at world No. 49. She also took over from Heather Watson as the British number one.

Konta's final event of the season was the Linz Open. She entered in qualifying, where she was the top seed, but lost to Klára Koukalová in the final round, her first defeat against a lower-ranked player since May. However, Konta received an entry to the main draw despite the loss, as she was awarded a lucky loser spot, after Anna Karolína Schmiedlová withdrew due to illness. She eased past Annika Beck in the opening round, but went out at the next stage to Madison Brengle. Her year-end ranking was 47. Konta's successful year was recognized by being nominated at the annual WTA Awards. She was a finalist in the Most Improved Player category, but missed out on the award to French Open semifinalist Timea Bacsinszky.

=== 2016: First major semifinal, top 10 & first WTA Tour title ===
Konta had a slow start to 2016 as she was eliminated in the first round at Shenzhen, where she was the fifth seed (her first seeding at WTA Tour-level) and also at Hobart.

Konta's next event saw her make her main-draw debut at the Australian Open. In the opening round she faced Venus Williams, who was seeded eighth. The match was played on Rod Laver Arena, with Konta winning in straight sets. Konta backed up her win by beating Zheng Saisai and Denisa Allertová, setting up a fourth-round clash with 21st seed Ekaterina Makarova. Konta recovered from a set behind to defeat the Russian and reach her first major quarterfinal. Konta defeated qualifier Zhang Shuai in the last-eight before her run ultimately came to an end in the semifinals, where she lost to eventual champion Angelique Kerber, in straight sets. Nonetheless, she became the first British female player to reach a major singles semifinal in 32 years. Konta also teamed up with fellow Brit Heather Watson to play the doubles. They beat a seeded pair in the opening round, before exiting at the next stage. Konta was at new career highs in the post-tournament rankings, moving up to world No. 28 for singles and breaking into the top 100 for the first time in doubles, at world No. 95. She also passed the $1 million mark for career earnings.

Konta took a brief break due to illness following the Australian Open, returning to action for the spring North American hardcourt swing. She was the fourth seed for the Mexican Open in Acapulco, where she exited in the second round, and also for the Monterrey Open, where she reached the quarterfinals and lost to Kirsten Flipkens. Konta then moved to the United States to participate in the Premier Mandatory events, the highest level on the WTA Tour, at Indian Wells and Miami. She was seeded 25th at Indian Wells, which gave her a bye into the second round where she defeated Madison Brengle. Konta then beat Denisa Allertová, before exiting in the fourth round to 18th seed Karolína Plíšková. Konta moved on to Miami, where she was seeded 24th, which again saw her benefit from a bye to the second round. Wins over Danka Kovinić and Elena Vesnina took Konta to the last 16, where she beat 32nd seed Monica Niculescu. She lost in the quarterfinals to Victoria Azarenka, who was en-route to completing the Indian Wells/Miami double. Konta's form in North America saw her rise to a new career-high ranking of 21.

The WTA Tour then made its spring switch to clay. Konta had a disappointing start on the surface as she lost her opening match in Stuttgart, before retiring with illness during the first round in Madrid. Her form improved in Rome as she beat Johanna Larsson and then upset world No. 7, Roberta Vinci, before exiting in the third round to Misaki Doi. Konta moved on to Paris for the French Open. She was 20th seed, the first time she had been seeded at a Grand Slam tournament, but was eliminated in the opening round by Julia Görges.

Konta entered the grass-court season as world No. 18 as her ranking climbed to a new high despite her opening-round loss at Roland Garros. After early losses at the Nottingham Open and the Birmingham Classic, Konta reached the semifinal in Eastbourne, the site of her breakout performance in 2015. Her run included a victory over two-time Wimbledon champion Petra Kvitová in the third round, but was ended in the last four by Karolína Plíšková.

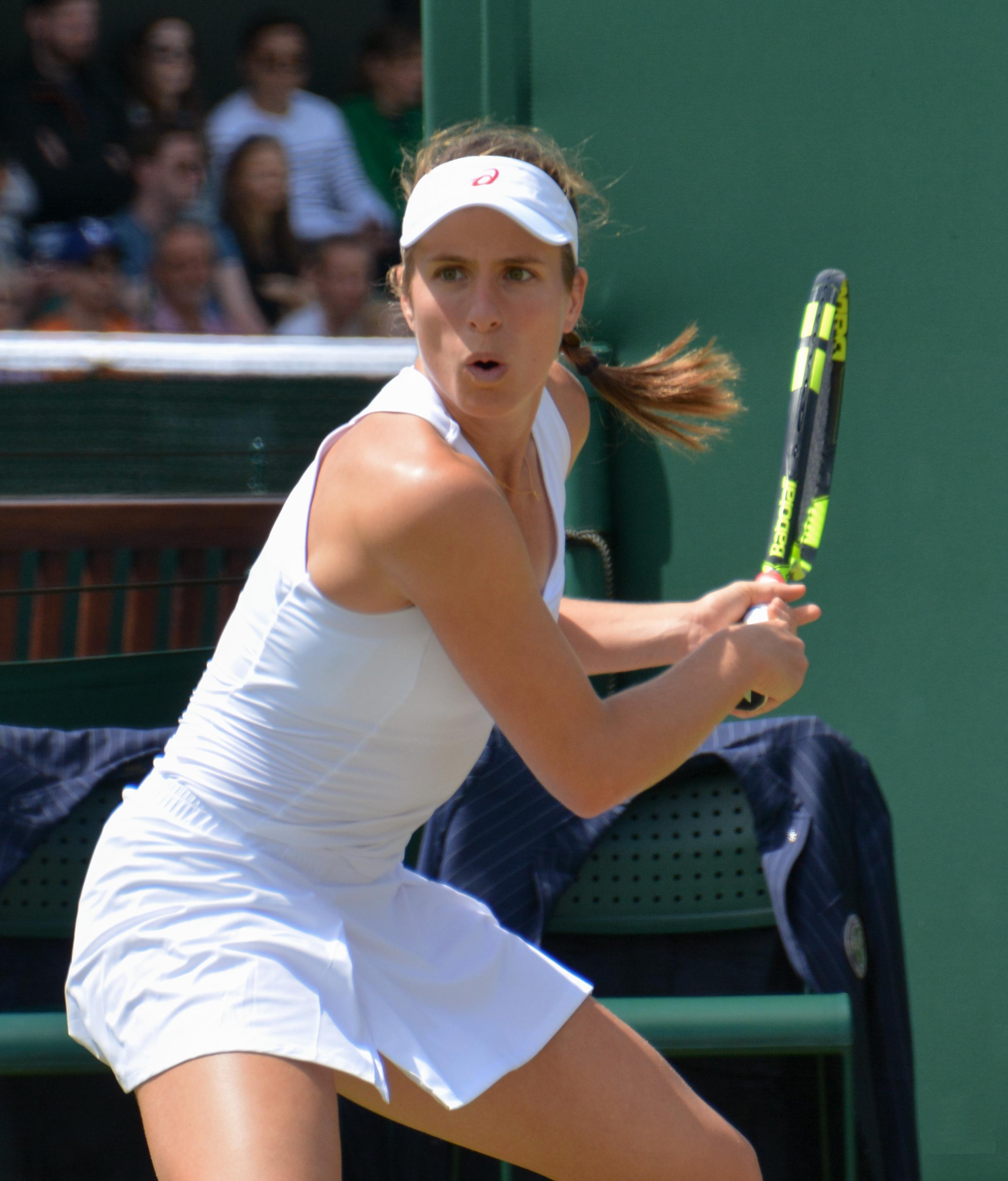
Konta at the 2016 Wimbledon Championships

Konta was the first home player to be seeded in the ladies singles at Wimbledon in over 30 years as she took the No. 16 spot. She recorded her first ever win at the venue by beating Monica Puig in a rain-affected opening round match, but went out at the next stage to former finalist Eugenie Bouchard. Following Wimbledon, Konta changed surface to hardcourts to play the Stanford Classic. In the semifinals she beat Dominika Cibulková, who had led the WTA in match wins at the time. Konta then defeated two-time former champion Venus Williams in the final to claim her first WTA Tour title. The following week, she reached the quarterfinals of the Canadian Open, the women's portion of which was held in Montreal. She was within one victory of breaking into the top ten, but missed out on the landmark, after suffering a surprise defeat to Kristina Kučová.

The Rio Olympics was Konta's next event, as she represented Britain in singles, women's doubles and mixed doubles. She was seeded tenth in singles, easing past Stephanie Vogt (Liechtenstein) and Caroline Garcia (France) in the first and second round, respectively. Konta reached the quarterfinals, after beating Svetlana Kuznetsova (Russia) in the third round, but was knocked out in the last eight by Angelique Kerber (Germany). Konta partnered Heather Watson in doubles, reaching the second round, before exiting to Chinese Taipei (Chan Hao-ching and Chan Yung-jan). She teamed up with Jamie Murray in the mixed, losing in the opening round to the eventual gold medalists (the United States pairing of Bethanie Mattek-Sands and Jack Sock).

After Rio, the WTA Tour resumed with the Cincinnati Open. Konta reached the third round, before going out to Agnieszka Radwańska. She moved on to the US Open recording victories in the opening two rounds over Bethanie Mattek-Sands and Tsvetana Pironkova. The win over Pironkova came despite a health scare towards the end of the second set, Konta collapsing on court and requiring medical attention before she could continue. Konta took just 52 minutes to beat 24th seed Belinda Bencic in the third-round, matching her run to the last 16 from the previous year. She was eliminated at that stage by Anastasija Sevastova.

The final weeks of the season saw Konta with the opportunity of breaking into the top ten and qualifying for the WTA Finals for the first time. Her first event on the Far Eastern leg of the WTA Tour was the Wuhan Open. A repeat of her Australian Open quarterfinal victory over Zhang Shuai took Konta to the third round. There she defeated Carla Suárez Navarro to record her fifth top ten win of 2016 and set up a last-eight meeting with Petra Kvitová, where she was knocked out of the competition. The following week saw Konta in Beijing for the China Open. She was drawn to face Sevastova in the opening round in a re-match of their US Open meeting of a few weeks prior, Konta gaining revenge for the defeat in New York. Victory over Tímea Babos at the next stage set up a third-round clash with Karolína Plíšková, which Konta won, reversing a previous 0–5 head-to-head record against the Czech. Konta progressed to the semifinal by beating Chinese number one, Zhang Shuai, for the second successive week. She defeated Madison Keys in the last four to reach her first Premier Mandatory final. Victory over Keys saw Konta enter the top ten for the first time in her career, making her the first British woman since Jo Durie in 1984 to be ranked amongst the elite of the WTA. It also lifted her into a qualifying place for the WTA Finals. Konta was beaten in the final by Agnieszka Radwańska.

Konta attempted to consolidate her Tour Finals place in Hong Kong, but an abdominal strain forced her to pull out of her second-round match. She slipped outside the qualifying spots when Dominika Cibulková won the tournament in Linz, which secured the last place for the Slovak. However, the subsequent withdrawal of Serena Williams gave Konta another chance. She had already travelled to Singapore to practice, only to be pipped for the final place less than 24 hours before the start of the event when Svetlana Kuznetsova won the title in Moscow. Konta remained at the venue as an alternate, but was unused. If Konta was to have qualified in the Tour Finals, she would become the first British woman since Jo Durie in the 1984 Virginia Slims Championships. Following her eventual absence from the WTA Finals' lineup, Konta entered the WTA Elite Trophy a week later in Zhuhai, China. She was placed in the Azalea Group alongside Sam Stosur and Caroline Garcia. Konta opened with a win over Stosur that guaranteed she would finish the season ranked inside the WTA's top ten, the first Briton to achieve this since 1983. She then beat Garcia to top the group and progress to a semifinal against Elina Svitolina, which Svitolina won to end Konta's season.

Konta led the 2016 WTA Tour in points won behind second serve, and sat third for top-ten wins, hardcourt-match wins and tie-breaks won. She also featured in the top ten of a number of other statistical categories. Konta was nominated as one of the WTA's Most Improved Players for the second successive year, winning the award comfortably on this occasion with over 80% of the vote. Her end-of-season ranking was No. 10.

After the conclusion of the season, Konta announced that she was parting company with her coaching team of Esteban Carril and Jose-Manuel Garcia, despite her 'stellar year'.

=== 2017: Miami Open champion, Wimbledon semifinalist ===
Konta started working with Belgian coach Wim Fissette during pre-season training. Their professional relationship began with Konta's reaching the semifinals of her first event of the new campaign in Shenzhen, before being beaten in the last four by eventual champion, Kateřina Siniaková. The following week in Sydney, she claimed her second WTA Tour title, avenging her Beijing loss to world No. 3, Agnieszka Radwańska, in the final. Konta did not lose a set in the entire tournament.

Ahead of the Australian Open Konta was widely regarded as a contender for the title. She recorded victories over Kirsten Flipkens, Naomi Osaka, former world No. 1, Caroline Wozniacki, where she hit 31 winners to six and did not face a single break point on serve, and 30th seed Ekaterina Makarova to reach the quarterfinals without dropping a set. Konta was then beaten in the last eight by the eventual champion, Serena Williams.

Her next action was in the Fed Cup Euro/Africa Zone Group I. Konta won her three singles matches in the round-robin pool as Britain reached a promotion play-off against Croatia. In the play-off Konta suffered a surprise singles defeat against Ana Konjuh, but then teamed up with Heather Watson to beat Konjuh and Darija Jurak in the decisive doubles and send Britain forward to a World Group II play-off later in the year.

Watson went from teammate to opponent as Konta won an all-British clash in the second round at Indian Wells, before exiting at the next stage against Caroline Garcia. The WTA Tour then traversed the United States to Miami, where Konta progressed to a quarterfinal meeting with third seed Simona Halep. Halep was twice two points from victory, when serving for the match at 5–4 in the second set and again in the subsequent tie-break, but both times Konta recovered and eventually won in three sets. She then defeated Venus Williams in the semifinal to progress through to her second Premier Mandatory final. There, she defeated Wozniacki to win the biggest title of her career to date, ensuring her re-entry into the WTA's top ten at a new career-high ranking of No. 7. With Premier Mandatory events second only to Grand Slams in terms prestige, some commentators rated Konta's Miami triumph as the most notable title for a British women since Virginia Wade had won Wimbledon 40 years previously.

Following her Miami triumph, Konta returned to Europe and joined back-up with the British Fed Cup team as they travelled to face Romania in the World Group II play-offs. The tie was marked by a number of incidents involving Romanian captain Ilie Năstase, culminating in him being first removed from the court and then having his accreditation revoked, effectively excluding him from the venue for the remainder of the tie, after he verbally abused Konta and British team skipper Anne Keothavong during the former's opening day singles rubber against Sorana Cîrstea. Konta broke down in tears over the abuse following Nastase's ejection, with play being suspended to allow her time to compose herself. Konta had been trailing in the second set prior to the interruption, but on resumption won five successive games to overturn the deficit and win the match, which levelled the tie at one rubber each. Konta subsequently lost to Simona Halep as Romania won by three rubbers to two. Năstase was later fined and banned for his behavior.

In the wake of the controversial Fed Cup tie Konta returned to WTA play for the clay-court season. Her first event on the surface was at Stuttgart, where she was eliminated in the second round by Anastasija Sevastova. She also lost in the opening round in Madrid to Laura Siegemund, and the third round in Rome to Venus Williams. Konta was seeded seventh in the French Open, but was upset by Hsieh Su-wei the first round. She remained yet to win a main draw match in Paris.

Konta began the grass-court swing in Nottingham, where she was the top seed. She reached the final, her first at WTA Tour-level on home soil and on grass, but was upset by Donna Vekić in the title match. The following week saw Konta eliminated in the second round in Birmingham. She then competed at the Eastbourne International. Following a bye into the second round, Konta beat Sorana Cîrstea, French Open champion Jeļena Ostapenko and world No. 1, Angelique Kerber, to reach the semifinals. She pulled out of the tournament on the morning of her semifinal because of a back injury she sustained in her quarterfinal match against Kerber, raising questions over her fitness for Wimbledon the following week.

Konta showed no ill-effects of the injury as she faced Hsieh Su-wei in the opening round of a Grand Slam championship for the second time in a row, defeating her in straight sets. In the second round, she recorded a three-set victory over Donna Vekić in a rematch of the Nottingham final. Wins against Maria Sakkari and Caroline Garcia saw Konta reach the quarterfinals, where she defeated second seed Simona Halep, denying Halep the world No. 1 ranking and becoming the first British woman to reach the Wimbledon singles semifinals since Virginia Wade in 1978. She was beaten in the last four by Venus Williams. Konta's ranking reached a new career-high of world No. 4.

Having opted to skip the defence of her Stanford title, Konta began her North American hard court swing in Toronto. Her opening match was against Ekaterina Makarova, which she lost despite holding match points in the second set. The following week in Cincinnati, she reached the quarterfinals with wins over Kiki Bertens and Dominika Cibulková, before losing to Simona Halep in the quarterfinal.

Konta then lost her first match in her next four tournaments. She lost to Aleksandra Krunić at the US Open, to Barbora Strýcová in Tokyo, to Ashleigh Barty in Wuhan and to Monica Niculescu in Beijing. As a result, on 9 October her ranking had fallen to No. 10. After withdrawing from the Kremlin Cup in Moscow as a result of a foot injury, she narrowly missed out on qualification for the WTA Finals for the second year running, with Caroline Garcia claiming the final spot at the year-end championships. On 18 October, Konta revealed that she and coach Wim Fissette would be parting and she would be ending her season, passing up being a reserve for the Finals or playing in the WTA Elite Trophy in Zhuhai. She confirmed the rest of her team would remain the same and she would be looking for a new coach "as soon as possible", and thanked Fissette for his "patience, hard work and expertise". Konta's end-of-season ranking was No. 9.

For being the first woman since 1978 to reach the Wimbledon semifinal and the first to win a Premier Mandatory title, Konta was nominated for the 2017 BBC Sports Personality of the Year Award, placing 11th of the 12 nominees on the public's vote.

=== 2018: Struggle with form ===
Konta hired Michael Joyce as her new coach during the off-season. In her first tournament of the year in Brisbane, Konta reached her first quarterfinal since August 2017 before retiring with a hip injury. She was unable to defend her title at Sydney the following week, losing in the first round. At the Australian Open, Konta was knocked out in the second round by world No. 123, lucky loser Bernarda Pera.

Following the Australian Open, Konta played for Britain in the Fed Cup Europe/Africa Group 1. Following a straightforward win over Maria João Koehler, Konta 'survived a scare' to beat Anett Kontaveit as Britain beat hosts Estonia to set up a play-off against Hungary. Konta beat Fanny Stollár as Britain progressed to the World Group II play-offs. Britain were hoping to be drawn at home for the first time since 1993, but instead were handed a tie away to Japan.

On resuming WTA play, Konta was eliminated prior to the quarterfinals of her next three tournaments, before failing to defend her title in Miami, losing in the fourth round to Venus Williams. She also exited early in the clay-court event at Charleston.

Konta next played in Britain's Fed Cup tie with Japan. She won both her singles rubbers, beating Kurumi Nara and recently crowned Indian Wells champion Naomi Osaka. However Britain were beaten in the other two singles rubbers to send the tie to a deciding doubles. Konta and Heather Watson were brought in as late replacements to play this, and though they won the opening set against the Japanese pairing of Miyu Kato and Makoto Ninomiya, the hosts fought back to win the rubber and claim overall victory.

After the Fed Cup Konta returned to clay court action. Her struggles on the surface continued as she suffered an early defeat in Madrid. Her form picked up in Rome, where she reached the third round, before exiting to Jeļena Ostapenko. Konta lost in the first round of the French Open to No. 93, Yulia Putintseva, in straight sets. At the time, she had never won a main-draw match at the French Open and in her post-match press conference she launched a scathing attack on the media.

Grass brought an upturn as Konta reached her first final of the year in Nottingham, after defeating defending champion Donna Vekić in the semifinals in a rerun of the 2017 final of the same event. She was looking to become the first British player to win a WTA Tour level title on home soil since Sue Barker in 1981, but was beaten in the final by Ashleigh Barty. However the resurgence in form was temporary as following this Konta suffered a first round loss in Birmingham, a second-round loss in Eastbourne, and a second-round loss at Wimbledon. Post-Wimbledon, her ranking dropped to 50 – her lowest since September 2015.

Konta's first tournament after Wimbledon was in San Jose. She was paired her with multiple Grand Slam champion Serena Williams in the first round and handed Williams the heaviest defeat of her career, the Briton winning 6–1, 6–0. She then beat Sofia Kenin, before losing to fourth seed Elise Mertens in the quarterfinals. She followed this by reaching the third round in Canadian Open, before losing to Elina Svitolina and then losing in the first round of Cincinnati to Aryna Sabalenka. Konta's struggles had seen ranking had slip outside the top 32, leading to her being drawn against sixth seed Caroline Garcia in the opening round of the US Open; she lost to continue a poor run of form in major matches since her Wimbledon semifinal run of the previous year.

Post the US Open Konta entered the Pan Pacific Open in Japan where she lost in the second round to Donna Vekić in two tight sets. She lost to Ashleigh Barty in the first round of the Wuhan. She also lost to Julia Görges in the opening round of the Beijing. Following these defeats Konta split with coach Michael Joyce and agreed a trial with Dimitri Zavialoff for the final event of the regular WTA season in Moscow. This provided an upbeat ending for Konta as she defeated Elise Mertens, Daria Gavrilova and Aliaksandra Sasnovich to reach her second semifinal of the year. She lost to Daria Kasatkina in the last four, who went on to win the tournament. This run moved Konta's end-of-year ranking up to 39 in the world. Following the successful trial at the Kremlin Cup, Konta hired Zavialoff as her coach on a permanent basis.

=== 2019: Return to top 20, deep runs in majors ===
Konta started the year at the Brisbane International by defeating third seed Sloane Stephens, before losing to Ajla Tomljanović in the second round. She received a lucky loser berth from qualifying for the Sydney International but withdrew with a neck injury. At the Australian Open she defeated Tomljanovic in a rematch of their Brisbane meeting, before losing in the second round to Muguruza in a marathon three set match that had the latest start in Australian Open history and ended after 3am local time.

Konta's next played the Fed Cup. Britain's ties in Europe/Africa Group 1 took place in Bath after the LTA were awarded co-hosting rights. This was the first time that the British Fed Cup team had played on home soil in 26 years. Konta recorded wins over Dalila Jakupović, Maria Sakkari and Anna Bondár as Britain topped their opening round pool with a 100% record to set up a promotional play-off with Serbia. Following a victory for teammate Katie Boulter in the opening rubber, Konta beat Aleksandra Krunić in a dramatic match to seal Britain's progress to a World Group play-off despite collapsing off-court after the end of the second set and requiring a medical timeout. Konta won a Fed Cup Heart Award for her efforts.

Konta opted not to play in either Doha or Dubai, instead returning to WTA action for the North American spring hardcourt swing. Her first event was in Acapulco where she defeated Laura Siegemund in the first round, followed by victory over Varvara Flink before losing in the quarterfinals to Donna Vekić. At Indian Wells, she defeated Pauline Parmentier and 27th seed Hsieh Su-wei, but went out to Kiki Bertens in the third round. In Miami, she lost in the second round to Wang Qiang of China.

Konta returned to Europe to rejoin Britain's Fed Cup team for their World Group II play-off against Kazakhstan. This was played at the Copper Box Arena in London. It was the first time the venue had hosted international team Tennis. In the play-off Konta twice recovered from a set down to beat Zarina Diyas and Yulia Putintseva. Konta's two victories took her winning run in Fed Cup singles play up to 11 matches. Teammate Boulter completed Britain's victory by three rubbers to one as she beat Diyas. Britain were therefore promoted to World Group II for 2020.

After returning from Fed Cup duties Konta entered the Morocco Open as the seventh seed. She saved three match points during her first-round match against Wang Yafan, before rallying to outlast the Chinese player in three sets and progress to a second round encounter with Ana Bogdan. She beat Bogdan and followed that by ousting Hsieh, the tournament's second seed, to reach the semifinals. There she defeated Tomljanović to reach her first ever clay-court final; Konta lost in the final to Maria Sakkari despite being a set and a break up.

At the Madrid Open, she defeated American Alison Riske to advance to a second-round match against third seed Simona Halep, which she lost in straight sets. The following week in Rome, Konta once again defeated Riske in the first round, moving on to face seventh seed Sloane Stephens. She lost the first set, however came back to win in three. Her third round match came later the same day due to a rain delay. She defeated Venus Williams to move into her first Premier level clay court quarterfinal. Konta defeated Czech teenager Markéta Vondroušová to reach the semifinals. She advanced to the final, after defeating Madrid Open champion Bertens; in the final, she was beaten by Karolína Plíšková, in straight sets. Following her Italian Open run, Konta's ranking improved to 26 in the world, securing her a seeding at the upcoming French Open.

Konta came to the French Open, having not won a main-draw match at the venue in four previous attempts. She finally broke her 'curse' by beating Antonia Lottner in the first round, and went on to advance to the semifinals. Her run included victory over Vekić in the fourth round and a third win of the year against Stephens in the quarterfinals. By reaching the semifinals, Konta became the first British female player to reach that stage of the French Open since Jo Durie in 1983. Konta was defeated in the semifinal by the unseeded Vondroušová in two tight sets. She returned to the top 20 in the WTA rankings after this run.

Konta started her grass-court campaign with a win over Anett Kontaveit in the first round of the Birmingham Classic. She lost to Jeļena Ostapenko in the second round. At Eastbourne, Konta reached the third round before losing to Ons Jabeur. She was seeded 19th at Wimbledon and went on to reach the quarterfinals, picking up her fourth win of the season against Stephens and defeating two-time former champion Petra Kvitová en-route. Konta was upset in the last eight by Barbora Strýcová.

Despite losing in the first round of both her US Open warm-up events, once at the US Open, Konta went on the best run of her career to date at the venue, beating former top ten player Daria Kasatkina and third seed Karolína Plíšková en route to the quarterfinals, where she lost to Elina Svitolina. She did not play in another tournament following the US Open, and finished the year as No. 12.

=== 2020: Mixed results, steady ranking ===
Starting her season at the Brisbane International, Konta lost in the first round to Barbora Strýcová. She then participated at the Australian Open, where she suffered a shock first-round exit to Ons Jabeur. Her next tournament was at St. Petersburg, where, in receipt of a first round bye, she lost to qualifier Océane Dodin in the second round. Her next tournament was at Monterrey, where she reached the semifinals, defeating Kim Clijsters, Tatjana Maria, and Anastasia Potapova, before falling to eventual runner-up Marie Bouzková. She was scheduled to play at Indian Wells, but the tour was suspended due to the COVID-19 pandemic.

Her first event upon the tour's resumption was at Lexington, where she lost in the first round to Bouzková in straight sets for the second consecutive meeting. She reached the semifinals at the Western & Southern Open, which was held in New York due to the pandemic. She defeated Kirsten Flipkens, Vera Zvonareva, and Maria Sakkari, before falling to the eventual champion, Victoria Azarenka. At the US Open she beat her compatriot Heather Watson in the first round, before losing to Sorana Cîrstea in the second round. Her next tournament was at Rome, where she defeated Irina-Camelia Begu, before falling to Garbiñe Muguruza in the third round. She then participated at the French Open, where she lost in the first round to Coco Gauff. She ended the year ranked No. 14 in the world.

=== 2021: Nottingham title, struggles with form, rankings drop, retirement ===
At the Gippsland Trophy in Melbourne, Konta won her first match of the year against Bernarda Pera, before losing to Irina-Camelia Begu. At the Australian Open, Konta retired from her first-round match against Kaja Juvan with an abdominal injury. She lost in the first round to Shelby Rogers in Adelaide, third round to Petra Kvitová in Miami, second round to Anastasija Sevastova in Madrid, and first round to Jeļena Ostapenko in Rome. Konta lost in the first round of the French Open to Sorana Cîrstea.

She won her first title in four years at the Nottingham Open on grass beating Lesley Pattinama Kerkhove, Kateryna Kozlova, Alison Van Uytvanck, and Nina Stojanović to reach the final in which she beat Zhang Shuai in under an hour.

Konta had to withdraw from Wimbledon because one of her team tested positive for COVID-19, forcing her to endure a quarantine.

At the Canadian Open in Montreal, Konta defeated Zhang Shuai in the first round, following her retirement in the second set. She then played third seed Elina Svitolina, and Konta claimed her first win against Svitolina after losing their first five matches. In the third round, Konta was forced to withdraw before her third round match against Coco Gauff due to a left knee injury.

Next, she played in Cincinnati but lost in the first round to Karolína Muchová, in three sets. She withdrew from the US Open because of an injury to her left thigh, and she did not play another match for the rest of the season. Her ranking fell to No. 113 in the world by 29 November 2021, her lowest placing since August 2015.

On 1 December 2021, Konta announced her retirement from professional tennis, suffering from a long-term right knee injury.

== Playing style ==
Konta was an aggressive baseliner, with her game centered around her flat, quick, and powerful groundstrokes. Konta was known for creating sharp angles, being able to hit winners from any position on the court. According to WTA match stats in 2016, she was fourth in ace counts, won 62% of her service points, 74.8% of service games and won most of the second serve points at 52.7%. She preferred to attack from the baseline, rather than to come to the net to volley. Konta was often criticized by commentators for a lack of mental toughness and a lack of variety or a "plan B" in tough match situations, but after hiring Dimitri Zavialoff as her coach, she utilised more drop shots and tried to come in more often although she retained an uncomfortable relationship with the net and never looked truly comfortable there. Grass was her favourite surface, but the majority of her success came on hard courts.

== Endorsements ==
Konta's clothing sponsor was Asics until 2019, when she switched to Ellesse. Her racquet sponsor was Babolat. She endorsed the Babolat Pure Aero range of racquets. In 2017, she became the first UK ambassador of Nature Valley cereal bars as part of their British Tennis partnership. In 2019 British accessories brand Radley named Konta as its second celebrity brand ambassador, as the face of its Radley Spirit campaign. In addition to fronting the Radley Spirit campaign ahead of Wimbledon, Konta also curated a collection of her favourite pieces from the spring/summer 2019 collection, the Johanna Konta collection.

== Coaching ==
Konta initially trained at the Sánchez-Casal Academy in Barcelona, before her parents decided to settle in Great Britain in 2005, and at the Roddick Lavalle Academy in Texas. She trained at the National Tennis Academy in Roehampton with LTA-supplied coaches Louis Cayer and, from mid-2012, Julien Picot. In December 2012, the Lawn Tennis Association announced that Konta was one of 21 players set to receive the LTA's funding next season, which is supported through Team Aegon.

At the start of 2014, she split from Picot for personal reasons. In August 2014, when the LTA decided to close the National Tennis Centre as a base for elite players, Konta began working with Spanish coach Esteban Carril. At the end of 2014, Konta began receiving help from mental coach Juan Coto, a friend of Carril's based in London. A dramatic cut in her LTA funding for 2015 encouraged Konta to move her training base to Gijón in northern Spain, where Esteban Carril and José Manuel García oversaw an increasingly rapid rise up the rankings. Supporters of the LTA's austerity drive argued this was a benefit of their tough love policy, though Konta disagreed that that was the case. After her mental coach Coto died suddenly in November 2016, Konta maintained that she would continue to benefit from his influence: "He's still very much a part of everything that I do, everything that I will continue to do in this sport and this career. He has gifted me with an incredible amount of tools and habits".

Konta split with Carril and Garcia in December 2016. Prior to the 2017 season, Konta recruited Belgian Wim Fissette to be her main coach. Konta and Fissette mutually ended this partnership in October 2017 after a poor run in the Asian tournaments. Konta retained the rest of her team and said she would spend the off-season looking for a new coach. On 6 December 2017, Konta announced she was hiring Michael Joyce for the 2018 season. On 10 October 2018, Konta announced that she had split with Joyce. She immediately commenced a trial period with Dimitri Zavialoff, a former coach of Stanislas Wawrinka, hiring him on a permanent basis three weeks later.

== Career statistics ==
=== Grand Slam performance timelines ===
Key
W	F	SF	QF	#R	RR	Q#	DNQ	A	NH

(W) winner; (F) finalist; (SF) semifinalist; (QF) quarterfinalist; (#R) rounds 4, 3, 2, 1; (RR) round-robin stage; (Q#) qualification round; (DNQ) did not qualify; (A) absent; (NH) not held; (SR) strike rate (events won / competed); (W–L) win–loss record.
To avoid confusion and double counting, these charts are updated at the conclusion of a tournament or when the player's participation has ended.

==== Singles ====
Tournament	2012	2013	2014	2015	2016	2017	2018	2019	2020	2021	SR	W–L	Win %
Australian Open	A	Q2	Q2	Q1	SF	QF	2R	2R	1R	1R	0 / 6	11–6	65%
French Open	A	Q2	Q3	1R	1R	1R	1R	SF	1R	1R	0 / 7	5–7	42%
Wimbledon	1R	1R	1R	1R	2R	SF	2R	QF	NH	A	0 / 8	11–8	58%
US Open	2R	Q1	1R	4R	4R	1R	1R	QF	2R	A	0 / 8	12–8	60%
Win–loss	1–2	0–1	0–2	3–3	9–4	9–4	2–4	14–4	1–3	0–2	0 / 29	39–29	57%

==== Doubles ====
Tournament	2012	2013	2014	2015	2016	2017	2018	W–L
Australian Open	A	A	A	A	2R	A	A	1–1
French Open	A	A	A	A	1R	A	1R	0–2
Wimbledon	1R	1R	1R	2R	3R	A	A	3–5
US Open	A	A	A	A	A	A	A	0–0
Win–loss	0–1	0–1	0–1	1–1	3–3	0–0	0–1	4–8

Preceded by Heather Watson	British Tennis number one 5 October 2015 – 12 September 2021	Succeeded by Emma Raducanu

Awards
Preceded by (Switzerland) Timea Bacsinszky	WTA Most Improved Player; 2016	Succeeded by (Latvia) Jeļena Ostapenko
