= 2011 WOW Tennis Challenger – Doubles =

Doubles
- 2011 WOW Tennis Challenger

Final
- Champion: (United States) Alexandra Mueller (United States) Asia Muhammed
- Runner-up: (Canada) Eugenie Bouchard (United States) Megan Moulton-Levy
- Score: 6–3, 3–6, [10–7]

Events
Singles	Doubles
← 2010 ·	Waterloo Challenger	· 2012 →

Elisabeth Abanda and Katarena Paliivets were the defending champions, but Paliivets chose not to participate. Abanda partnered up with Yawna Allen but lost in the first round.

Alexandra Mueller and Asia Muhammed won the tournament defeating Eugenie Bouchard and Megan Moulton-Levy in the final 6–3, 3–6, [10–7].

== Seeds ==
1. (Canada) Sharon Fichman / (Ukraine) Tetiana Luzhanska (quarterfinals)
2. (United States) Alexandra Mueller / (United States) Asia Muhammed (champions)
3. (United States) Amanda Fink / (Australia) Tammi Patterson (quarterfinals)
4. (Chinese Taipei) Hsu Wen-hsin / (South Africa) Chanel Simmonds (quarterfinals)

== Draw ==
=== Key ===
- Q = Qualifier
- WC = Wild card
- LL = Lucky loser
- Alt = Alternate
- SE = Special exempt
- PR = Protected ranking
- ITF = ITF entry
- JE = Junior exempt
- w/o = Walkover
- r = Retired
- d = Defaulted
- SR = Special ranking

=== Draw ===
First round
1	(Canada) S Fichman (Ukraine) T Luzhanska	6	6
(United States) C Scholl (Hong Kong) L Zhang	4	2
(Canada) E Bouchard (United States) M Moulton-Levy	7	2	[10]
(Slovenia) P Rampre (United States) E Tsay	6^{4}	6	[7]
4	(Chinese Taipei) W-h Hsu (South Africa) C Simmonds	7	7
WC	(Canada) S Molnar (Canada) C Zhao	6^{2}	6^{2}
(Canada) E Abanda (United States) Y Allen	0	1
(United States) J Boserup (Germany) K-A Grajdek	6	6
(United States) A Riske (United Kingdom) N Slater	6	1	[12]
(United States) J Elie (United States) W Jones	3	6	[10]
WC	(Canada) E Douglas-Miron (Canada) K-A Surin	7	1	[8]
3	(United States) A Fink (Australia) T Patterson	6^{5}	6	[10]
WC	(Canada) G Dabrowski (Canada) M Jodoin	7	6
(Japan) A Nakamura (Japan) A Yonemura	6^{6}	4
(United States) L Litvak (United States) E Lumpkin	4	0
2	(United States) A Mueller (United States) A Muhammed	6	6

Quarterfinals
1	(Canada) S Fichman (Ukraine) T Luzhanska	1	6^{4}
(Canada) E Bouchard (United States) M Moulton-Levy	6	7
4	(Chinese Taipei) W-h Hsu (South Africa) C Simmonds	3	2
(United States) J Boserup (Germany) K-A Grajdek	6	6
(United States) A Riske (United Kingdom) N Slater	6	6
3	(United States) A Fink (Australia) T Patterson	3	4
WC	(Canada) G Dabrowski (Canada) M Jodoin	2	2
2	(United States) A Mueller (United States) A Muhammed	6	6

Semifinals
(Canada) E Bouchard (United States) M Moulton-Levy	6	6
(United States) J Boserup (Germany) K-A Grajdek	2	4
(United States) A Riske (United Kingdom) N Slater	2	4
2	(United States) A Mueller (United States) A Muhammed	6	6

Final
(Canada) E Bouchard (United States) M Moulton-Levy	3	6	[7]
2	(United States) A Mueller (United States) A Muhammed	6	3	[10]
