= 2013 Cooper Challenger =

- Date: July 1 – July 7
- Edition: 6th
- Category: ITF Women's Circuit
- Prize money: US$50,000
- Surface: Clay – outdoors
- Location: Waterloo, Ontario, Canada
- Venue: Waterloo Tennis Club

Champions

Singles
- (Israel) Julia Glushko

Doubles
- (Canada) Gabriela Dabrowski / (Canada) Sharon Fichman
| ← 2012 · | Waterloo Challenger |

The 2013 Cooper Challenger was a professional tennis tournament played on outdoor clay courts. It was the 6th edition of the tournament and part of the 2013 ITF Women's Circuit, offering a total of $50,000 in prize money. It took place in Waterloo, Canada between July 1 and July 7, 2013. It was the final edition of the tournament.

== Singles main draw entrants ==
=== Seeds ===
| Country | Player | Rank^{1} | Seed |
|---|---|---|---|
| CAN | Sharon Fichman | 105 | 1 |
| ISR | Julia Glushko | 129 | 2 |
| AUS | Sacha Jones | 195 | 3 |
| TUN | Ons Jabeur | 211 | 4 |
| AUS | Monique Adamczak | 221 | 5 |
| CAN | Gabriela Dabrowski | 243 | 6 |
| USA | Sachia Vickery | 273 | 7 |
| JPN | Misa Eguchi | 280 | 8 |

- ^{1} Rankings are as of June 24, 2013

=== Other entrants ===
The following players received wildcards into the singles main draw:

- (Canada) Sandra Dynka
- (Canada) Gloria Liang
- (Canada) Jillian O'Neill
- (Canada) Charlotte Petrick

The following players received entry from the qualifying draw:

- (United States) Jacqueline Crawford
- (Canada) Marie-Alexandre Leduc
- (United States) Kyle McPhillips
- (Canada) Wendy Zhang

== Champions ==
=== Singles ===
- (Israel) Julia Glushko def. (Canada) Gabriela Dabrowski, 6–1, 6–3

=== Doubles ===
- (Canada) Gabriela Dabrowski / (Canada) Sharon Fichman def. (Japan) Misa Eguchi / (Japan) Eri Hozumi, 7–6^{(8–6)}, 6–3
