= 2013 Cooper Challenger – Singles =

Singles
- 2013 Cooper Challenger

Final
- Champion: (Israel) Julia Glushko
- Runner-up: (Canada) Gabriela Dabrowski
- Score: 6–1, 6–3

Events
| Singles | Doubles |
| ← 2012 · | Waterloo Challenger |

Sharon Fichman was the defending champion, having won the event in 2012, but she lost in the quarterfinals to Gabriela Dabrowski.

Julia Glushko won the title, defeating Dabrowski in the final, 6–1, 6–3.

== Seeds ==
1. (Canada) Sharon Fichman (quarterfinals)
2. (Israel) Julia Glushko (champion)
3. (Australia) Sacha Jones (semifinals)
4. (Tunisia) Ons Jabeur (semifinals)
5. (Australia) Monique Adamczak (quarterfinals)
6. (Canada) Gabriela Dabrowski (final)
7. (United States) Sachia Vickery (quarterfinals)
8. (Japan) Misa Eguchi (second round)

== Main draw ==
=== Key ===
- Q = Qualifier
- WC = Wild card
- LL = Lucky loser
- Alt = Alternate
- SE = Special exempt
- PR = Protected ranking
- ITF = ITF entry
- JE = Junior exempt
- w/o = Walkover
- r = Retired
- d = Defaulted
- SR = Special ranking

=== Finals ===
Semifinals
6 | (Canada) Gabriela Dabrowski | 6 | 6
4 | (Tunisia) Ons Jabeur | 4 | 3
3 | (Australia) Sacha Jones | 6 | 6^{1} | 6^{9}
2 | (Israel) Julia Glushko | 4 | 7^{7} | 7^{11}

Final
6 | (Canada) Gabriela Dabrowski | 1 | 3
2 | (Israel) Julia Glushko | 6 | 6

=== Top half ===
First round
1 | (Canada) S Fichman | 6 | 6
(Japan) E Mutaguchi | 1 | 0
WC | (Canada) G Liang | 6 | 3 | 6
WC | (Canada) S Dynka | 2 | 6 | 1
(Japan) K Ito | 2 | 2
(United States) L Litvak | 6 | 6
(United States) A Mueller | 6^{4} | 3
6 | (Canada) G Dabrowski | 7^{7} | 6
4 | (Tunisia) O Jabeur | 6 | 6
(Canada) E Fournier | 2 | 3
(Slovenia) D Jakupović | 6 | 6
(France) S Benamar | 4 | 4
WC | (Canada) J O'Neill | 6 | 6
(Australia) J Moriarty | 4 | 1
(Israel) K Shlomo | 2 | 0
8 | (Japan) M Eguchi | 6 | 6

Second round
1 | (Canada) S Fichman | 6 | 6
WC | (Canada) G Liang | 3 | 3
(United States) L Litvak | 4 | 3
6 | (Canada) G Dabrowski | 6 | 6
4 | (Tunisia) O Jabeur | 6 | 2 | 6
(Slovenia) D Jakupović | 0 | 6 | 4
WC | (Canada) J O'Neill | 7 | 2 | 6
8 | (Japan) M Eguchi | 5 | 6 | 4

Quarterfinals
1 | (Canada) S Fichman | 4 | 6 | 5
6 | (Canada) G Dabrowski | 6 | 3 | 7
4 | (Tunisia) O Jabeur | 6 | 6
WC | (Canada) J O'Neill | 3 | 1

Semifinals
6 | (Canada) G Dabrowski | 6 | 6
4 | (Tunisia) O Jabeur | 4 | 3

=== Bottom half ===
First round
7 | (United States) S Vickery | 3 | 6 | 6
(United States) N Melichar | 6 | 4 | 0
Q | (United States) J Crawford | 4 | 6^{2}
(United States) T Kinard | 6 | 7^{7}
Q | (Canada) M-A Leduc | 1 | 3
(Slovakia) L Wienerová | 6 | 6
Q | (United States) K McPhillips | 4 | 6 | 2
3 | (Australia) S Jones | 6 | 4 | 6
5 | (Australia) M Adamczak | 6 | 6
(Canada) E Routliffe | 2 | 0
(Japan) E Hozumi | 4 | 6 | 6
(Australia) J Moore | 6 | 3 | 4
(Canada) S Molnar | 6 | 6
Q | (Canada) W Zhang | 4 | 4
WC | (Canada) C Petrick | 2 | 2
2 | (Israel) J Glushko | 6 | 6

Second round
7 | (United States) S Vickery | 6 | 6
(United States) T Kinard | 0 | 2
(Slovakia) L Wienerová | 7^{7} | 3 | 3
3 | (Australia) S Jones | 6^{5} | 6 | 6
5 | (Australia) M Adamczak | 7 | 7
(Japan) E Hozumi | 5 | 5
(Canada) S Molnar | 6 | 1 | 6^{6}
2 | (Israel) J Glushko | 1 | 6 | 7^{8}

Quarterfinals
7 | (United States) S Vickery | 6 | 5 | 6^{3}
3 | (Australia) S Jones | 2 | 7 | 7^{7}
5 | (Australia) M Adamczak | 3 | 4
2 | (Israel) J Glushko | 6 | 6

Semifinals
3 | (Australia) S Jones | 6 | 6^{1} | 6^{9}
2 | (Israel) J Glushko | 4 | 7^{7} | 7^{11}
