= 2012 Cooper Challenger =

- Date: July 9 – July 15
- Edition: 5th
- Category: ITF Women's Circuit
- Prize money: US$50,000
- Surface: Clay – outdoors
- Location: Waterloo, Ontario, Canada
- Venue: Waterloo Tennis Club

Champions

Singles
- (Canada) Sharon Fichman

Doubles
- (Canada) Sharon Fichman / (Canada) Marie-Ève Pelletier
← 2011 ·	Waterloo Challenger	· 2013 →

The 2012 Cooper Challenger was a professional tennis tournament played on outdoor clay courts. It was the 5th edition of the tournament and part of the 2012 ITF Women's Circuit, offering a total of $50,000 in prize money. It took place in Waterloo, Ontario, Canada between July 9 and July 15, 2012.

== Singles main draw entrants ==
=== Seeds ===
Country	Player	Rank^{1}	Seed
CAN	Sharon Fichman	197	1
ISR	Julia Glushko	226	2
JPN	Misa Eguchi	254	3
CAN	Marie-Ève Pelletier	255	4
JPN	Rika Fujiwara	271	5
VEN	Gabriela Paz	317	6
AUT	Nicole Rottmann	326	7
AUT	Tina Schiechtl	327	8

- ^{1} Rankings are as of June 25, 2012

=== Other entrants ===
The following players received wildcards into the singles main draw:

- (Canada) Élisabeth Abanda
- (Canada) Marianne Jodoin
- (Canada) Sonja Molnar
- (Canada) Stephanie Wetmore

The following players received entry from the qualifying draw:

- (United States) Veronica Corning
- (France) Sherazad Benamar
- (Canada) Sandra Dynka
- (United States) Erin Clark

== Champions ==
=== Singles ===
- (Canada) Sharon Fichman def. (Israel) Julia Glushko, 6–3, 6–2

=== Doubles ===
- (Canada) Sharon Fichman / (Canada) Marie-Ève Pelletier def. (Japan) Shuko Aoyama / (Canada) Gabriela Dabrowski, 6–2, 7–5
