= 2014 Odlum Brown Vancouver Open – Women's doubles =

Women's doubles
- 2014 Odlum Brown Vancouver Open

Final
- Champions: (United States) Asia Muhammad (United States) Maria Sanchez
- Runners-up: (United States) Jamie Loeb (United States) Allie Will
- Score: 6–3, 1–6, [10–8]

Events
Singles	men	women
Doubles	men	women
← 2013 ·	Vancouver Open	· 2015 →

Sharon Fichman and Maryna Zanevska were the defending champions, but both players chose not to participate.

Asia Muhammad and Maria Sanchez won the all-American final, defeating Jamie Loeb and Allie Will, 6–3, 1–6, [10–8].

== Seeds ==
1. (Australia) Jarmila Gajdošová / (United States) Anna Tatishvili (semifinals; withdrew)
2. (United Kingdom) Naomi Broady / (Netherlands) Michaëlla Krajicek (quarterfinals)
3. (United States) Asia Muhammad / (United States) Maria Sanchez (champions)
4. (United States) Samantha Crawford / (Switzerland) Romina Oprandi (first round)

== Draw ==
=== Key ===
- Q = Qualifier
- WC = Wild card
- LL = Lucky loser
- Alt = Alternate
- SE = Special exempt
- PR = Protected ranking
- ITF = ITF entry
- JE = Junior exempt
- w/o = Walkover
- r = Retired
- d = Defaulted
- SR = Special ranking

First round
1	(Australia) J Gajdošová (United States) A Tatishvili	6	7^{7}
Q	(Japan) M Hibi (United States) A Weinhold	3	6^{5}
Q	(United States) D Muresan (United States) C Whoriskey	3	6	[9]
(United States) J Abaza (United States) M Brengle	6	1	[11]
3	(United States) A Muhammad (United States) M Sanchez	w/o
(United States) J Cako (United States) N Pluskota
WC	(United States) J Brady (United States) ZG Scandalis	4	3
(Japan) E Hozumi (France) I Pavlovic	6	6
(Brazil) L Pigossi (Mexico) M Zacarías	2^{r}
(Poland) J Jegiołka (Japan) C Okadaue	3
WC	(Canada) S Fung (Canada) P Januskova	6	6
4	(United States) S Crawford (Switzerland) R Oprandi	4	4
(Japan) N Hibino (Japan) R Sawayanagi	7	2	[5]
(United States) J Loeb (United States) A Will	5	6	[10]
(United States) J Boserup (Chinese Taipei) C-y Hsu	2	3
2	(United Kingdom) N Broady (Netherlands) M Krajicek	6	6

Quarterfinals
1	(Australia) J Gajdošová (United States) A Tatishvili	6	6
(United States) J Abaza (United States) M Brengle	2	2
3	(United States) A Muhammad (United States) M Sanchez	4	6	[10]
(Japan) E Hozumi (France) I Pavlovic	6	3	[5]
(Poland) J Jegiołka (Japan) C Okadaue	6	6
WC	(Canada) S Fung (Canada) P Januskova	1	3
(United States) J Loeb (United States) A Will	6	6
2	(United Kingdom) N Broady (Netherlands) M Krajicek	4	3

Semifinals
1	(Australia) J Gajdošová (United States) A Tatishvili
3	(United States) A Muhammad (United States) M Sanchez	w/o
(Poland) J Jegiołka (Japan) C Okadaue	5	4
(United States) J Loeb (United States) A Will	7	6

Final
3	(United States) A Muhammad (United States) M Sanchez	6	1	[10]
(United States) J Loeb (United States) A Will	3	6	[8]
