= 2013 Cooper Challenger – Doubles =

Doubles
- 2013 Cooper Challenger

Final
- Champions: (Canada) Gabriela Dabrowski (Canada) Sharon Fichman
- Runners-up: (Japan) Misa Eguchi (Japan) Eri Hozumi
- Score: 7–6^{(8–6)}, 6–3

Events
Singles	Doubles
← 2012 ·	Waterloo Challenger

Sharon Fichman and Marie-Ève Pelletier were the defending champions, having won the event in 2012, but Pelletier had retired this year after the 2013 Australian Open. Fichman partnered up with Gabriela Dabrowski as the first seeds and they went on to win the title, defeating Misa Eguchi and Eri Hozumi in the final, 7–6^{(8–6)}, 6–3.

== Seeds ==
1. (Canada) Gabriela Dabrowski / (Canada) Sharon Fichman (champions)
2. (United States) Nicole Melichar / (Slovakia) Lenka Wienerová (semifinals)
3. (Japan) Misa Eguchi / (Japan) Eri Hozumi (final)
4. (United States) Lena Litvak / (Australia) Jessica Moore (first round)

== Draw ==
=== Key ===
- Q = Qualifier
- WC = Wild card
- LL = Lucky loser
- Alt = Alternate
- SE = Special exempt
- PR = Protected ranking
- ITF = ITF entry
- JE = Junior exempt
- w/o = Walkover
- r = Retired
- d = Defaulted
- SR = Special ranking

First round
1	(Canada) G Dabrowski (Canada) S Fichman	6	6
(Canada) K Blajkevitch (Israel) K Shlomo	2	0
WC	(Canada) M-A Leduc (Canada) G Liang	6	6
(United States) S Kent (United States) A Murdock	1	4
4	(United States) L Litvak (Australia) J Moore	6	5	[9]
(Australia) S Jones (Australia) J Moriarty	1	7	[11]
(Slovenia) D Jakupović (United States) A Riley	1	3
(Canada) E Routliffe (United States) S Vickery	6	6
(United States) D Mills (Canada) C Petrick	0	2
WC	(Canada) E Fournier (Canada) P Januskova	6	6
WC	(Canada) S Dynka (Canada) J O'Neill	1	1
3	(Japan) M Eguchi (Japan) E Hozumi	6	6
(United States) E Clark (Canada) S Molnar	6	6
(United States) E Harman (United States) A Mueller	1	4
(Japan) K Ito (Japan) E Mutaguchi	4	5
2	(United States) N Melichar (Slovakia) L Wienerová	6	7

Quarterfinals
1	(Canada) G Dabrowski (Canada) S Fichman	6	6
WC	(Canada) M-A Leduc (Canada) G Liang	1	1
(Australia) S Jones (Australia) J Moriarty	5	3
(Canada) E Routliffe (United States) S Vickery	7	6
WC	(Canada) E Fournier (Canada) P Januskova	2	1
3	(Japan) M Eguchi (Japan) E Hozumi	6	6
(United States) E Clark (Canada) S Molnar	3	6^{6}
2	(United States) N Melichar (Slovakia) L Wienerová	6	7^{8}

Semifinals
1	(Canada) G Dabrowski (Canada) S Fichman	6	6
(Canada) E Routliffe (United States) S Vickery	3	2
3	(Japan) M Eguchi (Japan) E Hozumi	6	6
2	(United States) N Melichar (Slovakia) L Wienerová	2	3

Final
1	(Canada) G Dabrowski (Canada) S Fichman	7^{8}	6
3	(Japan) M Eguchi (Japan) E Hozumi	6^{6}	3
