= 2014 ASB Classic =

- Date: 30 December 2013 – 4 January 2014
- Edition: 29th
- Draw: 32S / 16D
- Prize money: $250,000
- Surface: Hard
- Location: Auckland, New Zealand
- Venue: ASB Tennis Centre

Champions

Singles
- (Serbia) Ana Ivanovic

Doubles
- (Canada) Sharon Fichman / (United States) Maria Sanchez
| ← 2013 · | WTA Auckland Open | · 2015 → |

The 2014 ASB Classic was a women's tennis tournament played on outdoor hard courts. It was the 29th edition of the ASB Classic, and was part of the WTA International tournaments category of the 2014 WTA Tour. It took place at the ASB Tennis Centre in Auckland, New Zealand, on 30 December 2013 to 4 January 2014. Second-seeded Ana Ivanovic won the singles title.

== Finals ==
=== Singles ===
- (Serbia) Ana Ivanovic defeated (United States) Venus Williams 6–2, 5–7, 6–4

=== Doubles ===
- (Canada) Sharon Fichman / (United States) Maria Sanchez defeated (Czech Republic) Lucie Hradecká / (Netherlands) Michaëlla Krajicek 2–6, 6–0, [10–4]

== Points and prize money ==
=== Point distribution ===
| Event | W | F | SF | QF | Round of 16 | Round of 32 | Q | Q3 | Q2 | Q1 |
| Singles | 280 | 180 | 110 | 60 | 30 | 1 | 18 | 14 | 10 | 1 |
| Doubles | 280 | 180 | 110 | 60 | 1 | — | — | — | — | — |

=== Prize money ===
| Event | W | F | SF | QF | Round of 16 | Round of 32^{1} | Q3 | Q2 | Q1 |
| Singles | $43,000 | $21,400 | $11,300 | $5,900 | $3,310 | $1,925 | $1,005 | $730 | $530 |
| Doubles * | $12,300 | $6,400 | $3,435 | $1,820 | $960 | — | — | — | — |

_{^{1} Qualifiers' prize money is also the Round of 32 prize money}
_{* per team}

== Singles entrants ==
=== Seeds ===
| Country | Player | Rank^{1} | Seed |
|---|---|---|---|
| ITA | Roberta Vinci | 14 | 1 |
| SRB | Ana Ivanovic | 16 | 2 |
| BEL | Kirsten Flipkens | 20 | 3 |
| ROU | Sorana Cîrstea | 22 | 4 |
| USA | Jamie Hampton | 28 | 5 |
| CZE | Lucie Šafářová | 29 | 6 |
| GER | Mona Barthel | 34 | 7 |
| ITA | Karin Knapp | 41 | 8 |

- ^{1} Rankings as of 30 December 2013

=== Other entrants ===
The following players received wildcards into the singles main draw:

- (Czech Republic) Andrea Hlaváčková
- (Croatia) Ana Konjuh
- (Austria) Tamira Paszek

The following players received entry from the qualifying draw:

- (Canada) Sharon Fichman
- (Japan) Sachie Ishizu
- (Estonia) Anett Kontaveit
- (Czech Republic) Kristýna Plíšková

=== Withdrawals ===
Before the tournament

- (Czech Republic) Iveta Melzer → replaced by (United States) Lauren Davis
- (United Kingdom) Laura Robson (wrist injury) → replaced by (Sweden) Johanna Larsson
- (Russia) Elena Vesnina (ankle injury) → replaced by (Germany) Julia Görges

During the tournament

- (United States) Jamie Hampton (hip injury)

=== Retirements ===
- (Romania) Alexandra Cadanțu (right shoulder injury)

== Doubles entrants ==
=== Seeds ===
| Country | Player | Country | Player | Rank^{1} | Seed |
|---|---|---|---|---|---|
| CZE | Andrea Hlaváčková | CZE | Lucie Šafářová | 28 | 1 |
| ZIM | Cara Black | NZL | Marina Erakovic | 41 | 2 |
| CZE | Lucie Hradecká | NED | Michaëlla Krajicek | 128 | 3 |
| GER | Mona Barthel | USA | Megan Moulton-Levy | 145 | 4 |

- ^{1} Rankings as of 23 December 2013

=== Other entrants ===
The following pairs received wildcards into the doubles main draw:

- (Belgium) Kirsten Flipkens / (Serbia) Ana Ivanovic
- (New Zealand) Abigail Guthrie / (Australia) Sacha Jones

== See also ==
- 2014 Heineken Open – men's tournament
