= 2013 ASB Classic – Doubles =

Doubles
- 2013 ASB Classic

Final
- Champion: (Zimbabwe) Cara Black (Australia) Anastasia Rodionova
- Runner-up: (Germany) Julia Görges (Kazakhstan) Yaroslava Shvedova
- Score: 2–6, 6–2, [10–5]

Details
- Draw: 16
- Seeds: 4

Events
Singles	Doubles
← 2012 ·	WTA Auckland Open	· 2014 →

Andrea Hlaváčková and Lucie Hradecká were the defending champions, but decided not to participate.

Cara Black and Anastasia Rodionova won the title, defeating Julia Görges and Yaroslava Shvedova in the final, 2–6, 6–2, [10–5].

== Seeds ==
1. (Germany) Julia Görges / (Kazakhstan) Yaroslava Shvedova (final)
2. (New Zealand) Marina Erakovic / (United Kingdom) Heather Watson (quarterfinals)
3. (Latvia) Līga Dekmeijere / (United States) Megan Moulton-Levy (semifinals)
4. (United States) Jill Craybas / (Greece) Eleni Daniilidou (quarterfinals)

== Draw ==
=== Key ===
- Q = Qualifier
- WC = Wild card
- LL = Lucky loser
- Alt = Alternate
- SE = Special exempt
- PR = Protected ranking
- ITF = ITF entry
- JE = Junior exempt
- w/o = Walkover
- r = Retired
- d = Defaulted
- SR = Special ranking

First round
(New Zealand) A Guthrie (New Zealand) E Hayman	2	5
(Ukraine) Y Beygelzimer (Israel) J Glushko	6	7
4	(United States) J Craybas (Greece) E Daniilidou	6	6
(United States) L Davis (Canada) S Dubois	2	4
(Belgium) K Flipkens (Sweden) J Larsson	4	2
(France) J Coin (Canada) M-È Pelletier	6	6
(United States) I Falconi (United States) M Sanchez	6	3	[10]
(Turkey) Ç Büyükakçay (Japan) M Doi	3	6	[5]
(Romania) S Halep (Netherlands) A Rus	4	5
3	(Latvia) L Dekmeijere (United States) M Moulton-Levy	6	7
(Russia) S Kuznetsova (Belgium) Y Wickmayer	2	3
(Zimbabwe) C Black (Australia) A Rodionova	6	6
(New Zealand) PM Hourigan (New Zealand) C Williams	0	1
2	(New Zealand) M Erakovic (United Kingdom) H Watson	6	6

Quarterfinals
1	(Germany) J Görges (Kazakhstan) Y Shvedova	6	3	[10]
(Ukraine) Y Beygelzimer (Israel) J Glushko	4	6	[6]
4	(United States) J Craybas (Greece) E Daniilidou	4	6^{5}
(France) J Coin (Canada) M-È Pelletier	6	7^{7}
(United States) I Falconi (United States) M Sanchez	6^{6}	3
3	(Latvia) L Dekmeijere (United States) M Moulton-Levy	7^{8}	6
(Zimbabwe) C Black (Australia) A Rodionova	6	4	[10]
2	(New Zealand) M Erakovic (United Kingdom) H Watson	2	6	[5]

Semifinals
1	(Germany) J Görges (Kazakhstan) Y Shvedova	6	6
(France) J Coin (Canada) M-È Pelletier	4	1
3	(Latvia) L Dekmeijere (United States) M Moulton-Levy	4	4
(Zimbabwe) C Black (Australia) A Rodionova	6	6

Final
1	(Germany) J Görges (Kazakhstan) Y Shvedova	6	2	[5]
(Zimbabwe) C Black (Australia) A Rodionova	2	6	[10]
