= 2014 ASB Classic – Singles =

Singles
- 2014 ASB Classic

Final
- Champion: (Serbia) Ana Ivanovic
- Runner-up: (United States) Venus Williams
- Score: 6–2, 5–7, 6–4

Details
- Draw: 32 (4 Q / 3 WC )
- Seeds: 8

Events
Singles	Doubles
← 2013 ·	ASB Classic	· 2015 →

Agnieszka Radwańska was the defending champion, but she chose to participate at the Hopman Cup instead.

Ana Ivanovic won the title, defeating Venus Williams in the final, 6–2, 5–7, 6–4. It was her first title since November 2011, ending her longest title drought, and her first outdoor title since winning the 2008 French Open.

== Seeds ==
1. (Italy) Roberta Vinci (first round)
2. (Serbia) Ana Ivanovic (champion)
3. (Belgium) Kirsten Flipkens (semifinals)
4. (Romania) Sorana Cîrstea (first round)
5. (United States) Jamie Hampton (semifinals, withdrew because of a right hip injury)
6. (Czech Republic) Lucie Šafářová (first round)
7. (Germany) Mona Barthel (first round)
8. (Italy) Karin Knapp (first round)

== Draw ==
=== Finals ===
Semifinals
5	(United States) Jamie Hampton
(United States) Venus Williams	w/o
3	(Belgium) Kirsten Flipkens	0	6^{3}
2	(Serbia) Ana Ivanovic	6	7^{7}

Final
(United States) Venus Williams	2	7	4
2	(Serbia) Ana Ivanovic	6	5	6

=== Top half ===
First round
1	(Italy) R Vinci	6	4	2
WC	(Croatia) A Konjuh	3	6	6
(United States) L Davis	6	6
(New Zealand) M Erakovic	1	4
Q	(Czech Republic) Kr Plíšková	7^{7}	6
(Belgium) Y Wickmayer	6^{3}	0
WC	(Austria) T Paszek	6	0	3
5	(United States) J Hampton	1	6	6
4	(Romania) S Cîrstea	1	4
Q	(Canada) S Fichman	6	6
(United States) C McHale	4	3
(Spain) G Muguruza	6	6
WC	(Czech Republic) A Hlaváčková	3	6^{1}
(United States) V Williams	6	7^{7}
(Austria) Y Meusburger	6	6
7	(Germany) M Barthel	4	3

Second round
WC	(Croatia) A Konjuh	6	2	2
(United States) L Davis	2	6	6
Q	(Czech Republic) Kr Plíšková	3	4
5	(United States) J Hampton	6	6
Q	(Canada) S Fichman	6	3	3
(Spain) G Muguruza	1	6	6
(United States) V Williams	4	6	6
(Austria) Y Meusburger	6	3	2

Quarterfinals
(United States) L Davis	2	6	4
5	(United States) J Hampton	6	4	6
(Spain) G Muguruza	3	3
(United States) V Williams	6	6

Semifinals
5	(United States) J Hampton
(United States) V Williams	w/o

=== Bottom half ===
First round
8	(Italy) K Knapp	6	6^{3}	6^{2}
(Germany) J Görges	4	7^{7}	7^{7}
Q	(Estonia) A Kontaveit	3	6	3
Q	(Japan) S Ishizu	6	1	6
(Czech Republic) Ka Plíšková	7^{7}	6
(Argentina) P Ormaechea	6^{2}	1
(Puerto Rico) M Puig	4	5
3	(Belgium) K Flipkens	6	7
6	(Czech Republic) L Šafářová	6^{2}	3
(Japan) A Morita	7^{7}	6
(Romania) A Cadanțu	1	0^{r}
(Japan) K Nara	6	4
(Sweden) J Larsson	7	6
(Spain) L Domínguez Lino	5	0
(United States) A Riske	5	6^{2}
2	(Serbia) A Ivanovic	7	7^{7}

Second round
(Germany) J Görges	2	6	5
Q	(Japan) S Ishizu	6	3	7
(Czech Republic) Ka Plíšková	4	3
3	(Belgium) K Flipkens	6	6
(Japan) A Morita	0	1
(Japan) K Nara	6	6
(Sweden) J Larsson	1	1
2	(Serbia) A Ivanovic	6	6

Quarterfinals
Q	(Japan) S Ishizu	4	5
3	(Belgium) K Flipkens	6	7
(Japan) K Nara	2	3
2	(Serbia) A Ivanovic	6	6

Semifinals
3	(Belgium) K Flipkens	0	6^{3}
2	(Serbia) A Ivanovic	6	7^{7}

== Qualifying ==
=== Seeds ===
1. (United States) Coco Vandeweghe (qualifying competition)
2. (Canada) Sharon Fichman (qualified)
3. (United States) Shelby Rogers (second round)
4. (France) Claire Feuerstein (first round)
5. (Czech Republic) Kristýna Plíšková (qualified)
6. (United States) Irina Falconi (qualifying competition)
7. (Czech Republic) Lucie Hradecká (second round)
8. (United States) Grace Min (qualifying competition)

=== Qualifiers ===
1. (Czech Republic) Kristýna Plíšková
2. (Canada) Sharon Fichman
3. (Estonia) Anett Kontaveit
4. (Japan) Sachie Ishizu

=== Qualifying draw ===
==== First qualifier ====
First round
1	(United States) Coco Vandeweghe	7	6
(Russia) Valeria Solovyeva	5	1
(France) Irena Pavlovic	7^{10}	6
(Netherlands) Michaëlla Krajicek	6^{8}	3
(Canada) Stéphanie Dubois	2	4
(Ukraine) Yuliya Beygelzimer	6	6
(United States) Sachia Vickery	6	5	3
5	(Czech Republic) Kristýna Plíšková	3	7	6

Second round
1	(United States) Coco Vandeweghe	6	6
(France) Irena Pavlovic	2	1
(Ukraine) Yuliya Beygelzimer	6	6^{2}	2
5	(Czech Republic) Kristýna Plíšková	4	7^{7}	6

Qualifying competition
1	(United States) Coco Vandeweghe	7	3	4
5	(Czech Republic) Kristýna Plíšková	5	6	6

==== Second qualifier ====
First round
2	(Canada) Sharon Fichman	7	6
(Czech Republic) Renata Voráčová	5	1
(Germany) Kristina Barrois	6	6
(Chinese Taipei) Chan Chin-wei	1	4
WC	(New Zealand) Emma Hayman	0	1
(Netherlands) Richèl Hogenkamp	6	6
(Argentina) María Irigoyen	4	1
7	(Czech Republic) Lucie Hradecká	6	6

Second round
2	(Canada) Sharon Fichman	7	6
(Germany) Kristina Barrois	5	4
(Netherlands) Richèl Hogenkamp	6	6
7	(Czech Republic) Lucie Hradecká	4	2

Qualifying competition
2	(Canada) Sharon Fichman	7	6
(Netherlands) Richèl Hogenkamp	5	2

==== Third qualifier ====
First round
3	(United States) Shelby Rogers	6	6
(United States) Julia Cohen	2	4
(United States) Nicole Gibbs	6	3	2
(Estonia) Anett Kontaveit	2	6	6
WC	(New Zealand) Abigail Guthrie	4	2
(Bulgaria) Aleksandrina Naydenova	6	6
(China) Xu Yifan	3	6	2
6	(United States) Irina Falconi	6	3	6

Second round
3	(United States) Shelby Rogers	1	2
(Estonia) Anett Kontaveit	6	6
(Bulgaria) Aleksandrina Naydenova	2	3
6	(United States) Irina Falconi	6	6

Qualifying competition
(Estonia) Anett Kontaveit	6	7^{10}
6	(United States) Irina Falconi	3	6^{8}

==== Fourth qualifier ====
First round
4	(France) Claire Feuerstein	2	4
(France) Aravane Rezaï	6	6
(Japan) Sachie Ishizu	4	7^{7}	6
WC	(Australia) Sacha Jones	6	6^{4}	4
(Poland) Paula Kania	6	4	6
(United States) Maria Sanchez	4	6	3
WC	(New Zealand) Paige Mary Hourigan	2	1
8	(United States) Grace Min	6	6

Second round
(France) Aravane Rezaï	6	3	6^{5}
(Japan) Sachie Ishizu	3	6	7^{7}
(Poland) Paula Kania	6	6^{8}	2
8	(United States) Grace Min	3	7^{10}	6

Qualifying competition
(Japan) Sachie Ishizu	6	6
8	(United States) Grace Min	2	4
