= 2013 ASB Classic – Singles =

Singles
- 2013 ASB Classic

Final
- Champion: (Poland) Agnieszka Radwańska
- Runner-up: (Belgium) Yanina Wickmayer
- Score: 6–4, 6–4

Details
- Draw: 32 (4 Q / 3 WC )
- Seeds: 8

Events
Singles	Doubles
← 2012 ·	ASB Classic	· 2014 →

Zheng Jie was the defending champion, but she lost in the first round to Jamie Hampton.

Agnieszka Radwańska won the title, defeating Yanina Wickmayer in the final, 6–4, 6–4.

== Seeds ==
1. (Poland) Agnieszka Radwańska (champion)
2. (Germany) Julia Görges (second round)
3. (Belgium) Yanina Wickmayer (final)
4. (China) Zheng Jie (first round)
5. (Romania) Sorana Cîrstea (first round, retired due to illness)
6. (Kazakhstan) Yaroslava Shvedova (second round)
7. (United States) Christina McHale (first round)
8. (Germany) Mona Barthel (semifinals)

== Draw ==
=== Finals ===
Semifinals
1	(Poland) Agnieszka Radwańska	7^{7}	7^{7}
(United States) Jamie Hampton	6^{4}	6^{3}
3	(Belgium) Yanina Wickmayer	6	1	7^{7}
8	(Germany) Mona Barthel	4	6	6^{3}

Final
1	(Poland) Agnieszka Radwańska	6	6
3	(Belgium) Yanina Wickmayer	4	4

=== Top half ===
First round
1	(Poland) A Radwańska	6	6
LL	(Hungary) G Arn	2	2
(Romania) S Halep	4	6	6
(Netherlands) A Rus	6	3	1
WC	(Canada) E Bouchard	5	3
(Russia) E Vesnina	7	6
(Spain) L Arruabarrena Vecino	3	2
6	(Kazakhstan) Y Shvedova	6	6
4	(China) J Zheng	5	1
(United States) J Hampton	7	6
Q	(Canada) S Dubois	2	1
(New Zealand) M Erakovic	6	6
(Russia) S Kuznetsova	7^{7}	2	5
(Netherlands) K Bertens	6^{5}	6	7
(United Kingdom) H Watson	6
5	(Romania) S Cîrstea	3	r

Second round
1	(Poland) A Radwańska	6	6
(Romania) S Halep	3	1
(Russia) E Vesnina	6	6
6	(Kazakhstan) Y Shvedova	2	3
(United States) J Hampton	6	7^{7}
(New Zealand) M Erakovic	1	6^{5}
(Netherlands) K Bertens	6	3	6
(United Kingdom) H Watson	4	6	3

Quarterfinals
1	(Poland) A Radwańska	6	6
(Russia) E Vesnina	3	3
(United States) J Hampton	6	6^{5}	6
(Netherlands) K Bertens	1	7^{7}	2

Semifinals
1	(Poland) A Radwańska	7^{7}	7^{7}
(United States) J Hampton	6^{4}	6^{3}

=== Bottom half ===
First round
7	(United States) C McHale	4	1
(France) P Parmentier	6	6
(Kazakhstan) G Voskoboeva	1	7^{7}	5
(Belgium) K Flipkens	6	6^{2}	7
Q	(Thailand) N Luangnam	0	2
(Switzerland) R Oprandi	6	6
(Slovakia) M Rybáriková	6^{3}	2
3	(Belgium) Y Wickmayer	7^{7}	6
8	(Germany) M Barthel	6	6
Q	(United States) G Min	1	3
WC	(Greece) E Daniilidou	1	7^{7}	6
WC	(United States) C Vandeweghe	6	6^{5}	4
(Sweden) J Larsson	4	6	6
(Japan) M Doi	6	3	2
Q	(Latvia) A Sevastova	3	4
2	(Germany) J Görges	6	6

Second round
(France) P Parmentier	2	2
(Belgium) K Flipkens	6	6
(Switzerland) R Oprandi	3	0
3	(Belgium) Y Wickmayer	6	6
8	(Germany) M Barthel	7^{8}	6
WC	(Greece) E Daniilidou	6^{6}	2
(Sweden) J Larsson	7	6^{1}	6
2	(Germany) J Görges	5	7^{7}	3

Quarterfinals
(Belgium) K Flipkens	3	4
3	(Belgium) Y Wickmayer	6	6
8	(Germany) M Barthel	6	6
(Sweden) J Larsson	2	1

Semifinals
3	(Belgium) Y Wickmayer	6	1	7^{7}
8	(Germany) M Barthel	4	6	6^{3}

== Qualifying ==
=== Seeds ===
1. (United States) Lauren Davis (second round)
2. (Hungary) Gréta Arn (Qualifying competition, lucky loser)
3. (United States) Maria Sanchez (first round)
4. (France) Claire Feuerstein (first round)
5. (United States) Madison Keys (second round)
6. (Australia) Anastasia Rodionova (second round)
7. (Canada) Stéphanie Dubois (qualified)
8. (United States) Irina Falconi (first round)

=== Qualifiers ===
1. (Latvia) Anastasija Sevastova
2. (Thailand) Nudnida Luangnam
3. (United States) Grace Min
4. (Canada) Stéphanie Dubois

=== Lucky loser ===
1. (Hungary) Gréta Arn

=== Draw ===
==== First qualifier ====
First round
(Latvia) Anastasija Sevastova	6	6
(Slovakia) Anna Karolína Schmiedlová	4	1
(Thailand) Luksika Kumkhum	6	3	6
(Canada) Marie-Ève Pelletier	0	6	3
(Turkey) Çağla Büyükakçay	0	3
5	(United States) Madison Keys	6	6

Second round
1	(United States) Lauren Davis	2	6^{2}
(Latvia) Anastasija Sevastova	6	7^{7}
(Thailand) Luksika Kumkhum	6	6
5	(United States) Madison Keys	4	3

Qualifying competition
(Latvia) Anastasija Sevastova	6	6^{5}	6
(Thailand) Luksika Kumkhum	4	7^{7}	4

==== Second qualifier ====
First round
WC	(New Zealand) Imogen Golder	5	1
WC	(New Zealand) Emma Hayman	7	6
(France) Irena Pavlovic	6	6
WC	(New Zealand) Abigail Guthrie	1	1
(Thailand) Nudnida Luangnam	6	4	6
8	(United States) Irina Falconi	3	6	1

Second round
2	(Hungary) Gréta Arn	6	6
WC	(New Zealand) Emma Hayman	3	2
(France) Irena Pavlovic	6^{4}	5
(Thailand) Nudnida Luangnam	7^{7}	7

Qualifying competition
2	(Hungary) Gréta Arn	4	6	3
(Thailand) Nudnida Luangnam	6	3	6

==== Third qualifier ====
First round
3	(United States) Maria Sanchez	4	4
(United States) Grace Min	6	6
(Ukraine) Yuliya Beygelzimer	5	6	4
(United States) Jill Craybas	7	3	6
(Israel) Julia Glushko	6^{3}	3
(Ukraine) Maryna Zanevska	7^{7}	6
(United States) Shelby Rogers	6	6^{6}	1
6	(Australia) Anastasia Rodionova	3	7^{8}	6

Second round
(United States) Grace Min	7	5	6
(United States) Jill Craybas	5	7	4
(Ukraine) Maryna Zanevska	6^{4}	7^{8}	4
6	(Australia) Anastasia Rodionova	7^{7}	6^{6}	1^{r}

Qualifying competition
(United States) Grace Min	2	6	6
(Ukraine) Maryna Zanevska	6	4	3

==== Fourth qualifier ====
First round
4	(France) Claire Feuerstein	7^{7}	4	4
(France) Julie Coin	6^{5}	6	6
(Canada) Rebecca Marino	6	6
(Poland) Sandra Zaniewska	3	2
(South Africa) Chanel Simmonds	6	6
WC	(New Zealand) Paige Mary Hourigan	0	3
WC	(New Zealand) Claudia Williams	0	1
7	(Canada) Stéphanie Dubois	6	6

Second round
(France) Julie Coin	6	6
(Canada) Rebecca Marino	4	4
(South Africa) Chanel Simmonds	4	2
7	(Canada) Stéphanie Dubois	6	6

Qualifying competition
(France) Julie Coin	2	4
7	(Canada) Stéphanie Dubois	6	6
