= 2011 WOW Tennis Challenger =

- Date: July 4 – July 10
- Edition: 4th
- Category: ITF Women's Circuit
- Prize money: US$50,000
- Surface: Clay – outdoors
- Location: Waterloo, Ontario, Canada
- Venue: Waterloo Tennis Club

Champions

Singles
- (Canada) Sharon Fichman

Doubles
- (United States) Alexandra Mueller / (United States) Asia Muhammad
← 2010 ·	Waterloo Challenger	· 2012 →

The 2011 WOW Tennis Challenger was a professional tennis tournament played on outdoor clay courts. It was the 4th edition of the tournament and part of the 2011 ITF Women's Circuit, offering a total of $50,000 in prize money. It took place in Waterloo, Ontario, Canada between July 4 and July 10, 2011.

== Singles main draw entrants ==
=== Seeds ===
Country	Player	Rank^{1}	Seed
USA	Alison Riske	115	1
UKR	Tetiana Luzhanska	192	2
HKG	Zhang Ling	198	3
ISR	Julia Glushko	200	4
CAN	Sharon Fichman	245	5
RSA	Chanel Simmonds	252	6
USA	Chichi Scholl	271	7
TPE	Hsu Wen-hsin	284	8

- ^{1} Rankings are as of June 20, 2011

=== Other entrants ===
The following players received wildcards into the singles main draw:

- (Canada) Élisabeth Abanda
- (Canada) Sonja Molnar
- (Canada) Kimberley-Ann Surin
- (Canada) Carol Zhao

The following players received entry from the qualifying draw:

- (Belarus) Victoryia Kisialeva
- (United States) Elizabeth Lumpkin
- (United States) Diana Ospina
- (United Kingdom) Nicola Slater

== Champions ==
=== Singles ===
(Canada) Sharon Fichman def. (United States) Julia Boserup, 6–3, 4–6, 6–4

=== Doubles ===
(United States) Alexandra Mueller / (United States) Asia Muhammad def. (Canada) Eugenie Bouchard / (United States) Megan Moulton-Levy, 6–3, 3–6, [10–7]
