= 2011 WOW Tennis Challenger – Singles =

Singles
- 2011 WOW Tennis Challenger

Final
- Champion: (Canada) Sharon Fichman
- Runner-up: (United States) Julia Boserup
- Score: 6–3, 4–6, 6–4

Events
Singles	Doubles
← 2010 ·	Waterloo Challenger	· 2012 →

Julia Cohen was the defending champion, but chose not to participate.

Sharon Fichman won the final against Julia Boserup 6–3, 4–6, 6–4.

== Seeds ==
1. (United States) Alison Riske (quarterfinals)
2. (Ukraine) Tetiana Luzhanska (quarterfinals)
3. (Hong Kong) Zhang Ling (second round)
4. (Israel) Julia Glushko (second round)
5. (Canada) Sharon Fichman (champion)
6. (South Africa) Chanel Simmonds (quarterfinals)
7. (United States) Chichi Scholl (semifinals)
8. (Chinese Taipei) Hsu Wen-hsin (first round)

== Draw ==
=== Key ===
- Q = Qualifier
- WC = Wild card
- LL = Lucky loser
- Alt = Alternate
- SE = Special exempt
- PR = Protected ranking
- ITF = ITF entry
- JE = Junior exempt
- w/o = Walkover
- r = Retired
- d = Defaulted
- SR = Special ranking

=== Finals ===
Semifinals
5	(Canada) Sharon Fichman	6	6
(Slovenia) Petra Rampre	4	2
7	(United States) Chichi Scholl	6	4	3
(United States) Julia Boserup	2	6	6

Final
5	(Canada) Sharon Fichman	6	4	6
(United States) Julia Boserup	3	6	4

=== Top half ===
First round
1	(United States) A Riske	6	6
(Canada) G Dabrowski	2	4
(Japan) A Yonemura	6	6
WC	(Canada) E Abanda	4	3
(United States) A Fink	7	6
(Japan) R Tezuka	6^{0}	2
Q	(Belarus) V Kisialeva	2	2
5	(Canada) S Fichman	6	6
3	(Hong Kong) L Zhang	6	6
(Germany) K Grajdek	1	3
(United States) A Mueller	6	1	1
(Slovenia) P Rampre	4	6	6
(United States) A Muhammed	6	6
(Australia) T Patterson	2	2
(United States) L Litvak	4	4
6	(South Africa) C Simmonds	6	6

Second round
1	(United States) A Riske	6	6
(Japan) A Yonemura	3	1
(United States) A Fink	5	1
5	(Canada) S Fichman	7	6
3	(Hong Kong) L Zhang	3	1
(Slovenia) P Rampre	6	6
(United States) A Muhammed	4	6	2
6	(South Africa) C Simmonds	6	3	6

Quarterfinals
1	(United States) A Riske	3	5
5	(Canada) S Fichman	6	7
(Slovenia) P Rampre	6	7
6	(South Africa) C Simmonds	0	6^{6}

Semifinals
5	(Canada) S Fichman	6	6
(Slovenia) P Rampre	4	2

=== Bottom half ===
First round
7	(United States) C Scholl	6	6
WC	(Canada) K-A Surin	0	0
(Japan) A Nakamura	7	2	2
(Belgium) T Hendler	5	6	6
WC	(Canada) C Zhao	6	2	7
(United States) J Elie	1	6	5
Q	(United States) E Lumpkin	4	4
4	(Israel) J Glushko	6	6
8	(Chinese Taipei) W-h Hsu	1	6^{5}
Q	(United Kingdom) N Slater	6	7
(United States) J Boserup	6	7
WC	(Canada) S Molnar	3	6^{3}
Q	(United States) D Ospina	2	1
(Brazil) N Rossi	6	6
(Canada) E Bouchard	2	6	1
2	(Ukraine) T Luzhanska	6	4	6

Second round
7	(United States) C Scholl	6	6
(Belgium) T Hendler	1	4
WC	(Canada) C Zhao	7	6
4	(Israel) J Glushko	5	1
Q	(United Kingdom) N Slater	1	0
(United States) J Boserup	6	6
(Brazil) N Rossi	3	2
2	(Ukraine) T Luzhanska	6	6

Quarterfinals
7	(United States) C Scholl	6	6
WC	(Canada) C Zhao	0	3
(United States) J Boserup	6	6
2	(Ukraine) T Luzhanska	3	0

Semifinals
7	(United States) C Scholl	6	4	3
(United States) J Boserup	2	6	6
