= 2013 Odlum Brown Vancouver Open =

- Date: July 29 – August 4
- Edition: 9th (men); 12th (women)
- Category: ATP Challenger Tour; ITF Women's Circuit
- Prize money: US$100,000 (men); US$100,000 (women)
- Surface: Hard – outdoors
- Location: West Vancouver, British Columbia, Canada
- Venue: Hollyburn Country Club

Champions

Men's singles
- (Canada) Vasek Pospisil

Women's singles
- (United Kingdom) Johanna Konta

Men's doubles
- (Israel) Jonathan Erlich / (Israel) Andy Ram

Women's doubles
- (Canada) Sharon Fichman / (Ukraine) Maryna Zanevska
← 2012 ·	Vancouver Open	· 2014 →

The 2013 Odlum Brown Vancouver Open was a professional tennis tournament played on outdoor hard courts. It was the 9th edition, for men, and 12th edition, for women, of the tournament and part of the 2013 ATP Challenger Tour and the 2013 ITF Women's Circuit, offering totals of $100,000, for men, and $100,000, for women, in prize money. It took place in West Vancouver, British Columbia, Canada between July 29 to August 4, 2013.

== Men's singles main-draw entrants ==
=== Seeds ===
Country	Player	Rank^{1}	Seed
RUS	Evgeny Donskoy	77	1
CAN	Vasek Pospisil	89	2
GER	Benjamin Becker	102	3
USA	Wayne Odesnik	111	4
USA	Bobby Reynolds	138	5
TPE	Jimmy Wang	143	6
GER	Mischa Zverev	144	7
BEL	Olivier Rochus	148	8

- ^{1}Rankings are as of July 22, 2013

=== Other entrants ===
The following players received wildcards into the singles main draw:

- (Canada) Philip Bester
- (Canada) Frank Dancevic
- (United States) Austin Krajicek
- (United States) Tennys Sandgren

The following players received entry into the singles main draw by special exempts:

- (Canada) Filip Peliwo
- (United Kingdom) James Ward

The following players received entry from the qualifying draw:

- (Australia) John-Patrick Smith
- (Australia) Benjamin Mitchell
- (Republic of Ireland) James McGee
- (United States) Nicolas Meister

== Women's singles main-draw entrants ==
=== Seeds ===
Country	Player	Rank^{1}	Seed
TPE	Hsieh Su-wei	41	1
JPN	Kimiko Date-Krumm	65	2
JPN	Misaki Doi	105	3
ISR	Julia Glushko	110	4
JPN	Kurumi Nara	113	5
UKR	Maryna Zanevska	115	6
CAN	Sharon Fichman	119	7
CZE	Barbora Záhlavová-Strýcová	120	8

- ^{1} Rankings are as of July 22, 2013

=== Other entrants ===
The following players received wildcards into the singles main draw:

- (Canada) Elisabeth Fournier
- (United States) Sanaz Marand
- (United States) Natalie Pluskota
- (Canada) Carol Zhao

The following players received entry from the qualifying draw:

- (United Kingdom) Naomi Broady
- (United Kingdom) Jade Windley
- (Japan) Miharu Imanishi
- (United Kingdom) Emily Webley-Smith

== Champions ==
=== Men's singles ===
- (Canada) Vasek Pospisil def. (United Kingdom) Daniel Evans, 6–0, 1–6, 7–5

=== Women's singles ===
- (United Kingdom) Johanna Konta def. (Canada) Sharon Fichman, 6–4, 6–2

=== Men's doubles ===
- (Israel) Jonathan Erlich / (Israel) Andy Ram def. (United States) James Cerretani / (Canada) Adil Shamasdin, 6–1, 6–4

=== Women's doubles ===
- (Canada) Sharon Fichman / (Ukraine) Maryna Zanevska def. (United States) Jacqueline Cako / (United States) Natalie Pluskota, 6–2, 6–2
