= 2013 Odlum Brown Vancouver Open – Women's doubles =

Women's doubles
- 2013 Odlum Brown Vancouver Open

Final
- Champions: (Canada) Sharon Fichman (Ukraine) Maryna Zanevska
- Runners-up: (United States) Jacqueline Cako (United States) Natalie Pluskota
- Score: 6–2, 6–2

Events
Singles	men	women
Doubles	men	women
← 2012 ·	Vancouver Open	· 2014 →

Julia Glushko and Olivia Rogowska were the defending champions, having won the event in 2012, but lost in the first round to Stéphanie Dubois and Stéphanie Foretz Gacon.

Sharon Fichman and Maryna Zanevska won the tournament, defeating Jacqueline Cako and Natalie Pluskota in the final, 6–2, 6–2.

== Seeds ==
1. (Chinese Taipei) Hsieh Shu-ying / (Chinese Taipei) Hsieh Su-wei (semifinals)
2. (Israel) Julia Glushko / (Australia) Olivia Rogowska (first round)
3. (Canada) Sharon Fichman / (Ukraine) Maryna Zanevska (champions)
4. (United States) Jacqueline Cako / (United States) Natalie Pluskota (final)

== Draw ==
=== Key ===
- Q = Qualifier
- WC = Wild card
- LL = Lucky loser
- Alt = Alternate
- SE = Special exempt
- PR = Protected ranking
- ITF = ITF entry
- JE = Junior exempt
- w/o = Walkover
- r = Retired
- d = Defaulted
- SR = Special ranking

First round
1	(Chinese Taipei) S-y Hsieh (Chinese Taipei) S-w Hsieh	6	6
(United Kingdom) S Murray (United Kingdom) J Windley	4	3
(Japan) M Doi (Japan) M Miyamura	5	6	[10]
(United States) S Marand (Australia) S Peers	7	3	[3]
3	(Canada) S Fichman (Ukraine) M Zanevska	6	6
WC	(France) S Benamar (Canada) H El Tabakh	0	4
(Japan) A Omae (United States) C Scholl	0	6	[7]
(Australia) M Adamczak (Japan) M Eguchi	6	1	[10]
(United Kingdom) N Broady (United Kingdom) E Webley-Smith	6	6
Q	(Hong Kong) V Chan (Israel) K Shlomo	1	4
(Japan) E Sema (Japan) Y Sema	3	6	[8]
4	(United States) J Cako (United States) N Pluskota	6	3	[10]
Q	(United Kingdom) J Konta (United Kingdom) T Moore	6	6
(Austria) N Rottmann (Slovakia) L Wienerová	4	2
(Canada) S Dubois (France) S Foretz Gacon	7^{7}	6
2	(Israel) J Glushko (Australia) O Rogowska	6^{5}	3

Quarterfinals
1	(Chinese Taipei) S-y Hsieh (Chinese Taipei) S-w Hsieh	6	5	[10]
(Japan) M Doi (Japan) M Miyamura	2	7	[7]
3	(Canada) S Fichman (Ukraine) M Zanevska	6	6
(Australia) M Adamczak (Japan) M Eguchi	3	3
(United Kingdom) N Broady (United Kingdom) E Webley-Smith	0	1
4	(United States) J Cako (United States) N Pluskota	6	6
Q	(United Kingdom) J Konta (United Kingdom) T Moore
(Canada) S Dubois (France) S Foretz Gacon	w/o

Semifinals
1	(Chinese Taipei) S-y Hsieh (Chinese Taipei) S-w Hsieh	5	2
3	(Canada) S Fichman (Ukraine) M Zanevska	7	6
4	(United States) J Cako (United States) N Pluskota	6	7
(Canada) S Dubois (France) S Foretz Gacon	3	5

Final
3	(Canada) S Fichman (Ukraine) M Zanevska	6	6
4	(United States) J Cako (United States) N Pluskota	2	2
