= 2014 Odlum Brown Vancouver Open =

- Date: July 28 – August 3
- Edition: 10th (men); 13th (women)
- Category: ATP Challenger Tour; ITF Women's Circuit
- Prize money: US$100,000 (men); US$100,000 (women)
- Surface: Hard – outdoors
- Location: West Vancouver, British Columbia, Canada
- Venue: Hollyburn Country Club

Champions

Men's singles
- (Cyprus) Marcos Baghdatis

Women's singles
- (Australia) Jarmila Gajdošová

Men's doubles
- (United States) Austin Krajicek / (Australia) John-Patrick Smith

Women's doubles
- (United States) Asia Muhammad / (United States) Maria Sanchez
← 2013 ·	Vancouver Open	· 2015 →

The 2014 Odlum Brown Vancouver Open was a professional tennis tournament played on outdoor hard courts. It marked the 10th edition, for men, and the 13th edition, for women, of the tournament and part of the 2014 ATP Challenger Tour and the 2014 ITF Women's Circuit, offering totals of $100,000, for men, and $100,000, for women, in prize money. The tournament took place in West Vancouver, British Columbia, Canada between July 28 to August 3, 2014.

== Men's singles main-draw entrants ==
=== Seeds ===
Country	Player	Rank^{1}	Seed
CYP	Marcos Baghdatis	104	1
TPE	Jimmy Wang	126	2
CRO	Ante Pavić	140	3
UZB	Farrukh Dustov	144	4
GBR	Daniel Evans	147	5
GBR	James Ward	150	6
JPN	Hiroki Moriya	151	7
RUS	Alex Bogomolov Jr.	165	8

- ^{1} Rankings are as of July 21, 2014

=== Other entrants ===
The following players received wildcards into the singles main draw:

- (United States) Dennis Novikov
- (United States) Alexander Sarkissian
- (Australia) Jordan Thompson
- (South Africa) Rik de Voest

The following players received entry from the qualifying draw:

- (United States) Marcos Giron
- (United States) Jason Jung
- (United States) Connor Smith
- (South Africa) Fritz Wolmarans

The following players entered the singles main draw with a special exempt:

- (Australia) Thanasi Kokkinakis
- (United Kingdom) James Ward

== Women's singles main-draw entrants ==
=== Seeds ===
Country	Player	Rank^{1}	Seed
HUN	Tímea Babos	100	1
USA	Grace Min	111	2
USA	Anna Tatishvili	114	3
POL	Urszula Radwańska	117	4
PAR	Verónica Cepede Royg	138	5
USA	Melanie Oudin	139	6
EST	Anett Kontaveit	146	7
GBR	Naomi Broady	147	8

- ^{1} Rankings are as of July 21, 2014

=== Other entrants ===
The following players received wildcards into the singles main draw:

- (Canada) Khristina Blajkevitch
- (Canada) Gloria Liang
- (United States) Asia Muhammad
- (United States) Maria Sanchez

The following players received entry from the qualifying draw:

- (United States) Jennifer Brady
- (United States) Samantha Crawford
- (United States) Allie Will
- (Mexico) Marcela Zacarías

== Champions ==
=== Men's singles ===
- (Cyprus) Marcos Baghdatis def. (Uzbekistan) Farrukh Dustov, 7–6^{(8–6)}, 6–3

=== Women's singles ===
- (Australia) Jarmila Gajdošová def. (Ukraine) Lesia Tsurenko, 3–6, 6–2, 7–6^{(7–3)}

=== Men's doubles ===
- (United States) Austin Krajicek / (Australia) John-Patrick Smith def. (New Zealand) Marcus Daniell / (New Zealand) Artem Sitak, 6–3, 4–6, [10–8]

=== Women's doubles ===
- (United States) Asia Muhammad / (United States) Maria Sanchez def. (United States) Jamie Loeb / (United States) Allie Will, 6–3, 1–6, [10–8]
