= 2014 Odlum Brown Vancouver Open – Men's singles =

Men's singles
- 2014 Odlum Brown Vancouver Open

Final
- Champion: (Cyprus) Marcos Baghdatis
- Runner-up: (Uzbekistan) Farrukh Dustov
- Score: 7–6^{(8–6)}, 6–3

Events
Singles	men	women
Doubles	men	women
← 2013 ·	Vancouver Open	· 2015 →

Vasek Pospisil was the defending champion, but decided not participate this year.

Marcos Baghdatis won the title, defeating Farrukh Dustov 7–6^{(8–6)}, 6–3 in the final.

== Seeds ==
1. (Cyprus) Marcos Baghdatis (champion)
2. (Chinese Taipei) Jimmy Wang (first round)
3. (Croatia) Ante Pavić (first round)
4. (Uzbekistan) Farrukh Dustov (final)
5. (United Kingdom) Daniel Evans (second round)
6. (United Kingdom) James Ward (semifinals)
7. (Japan) Hiroki Moriya (first round)
8. (Russia) Alex Bogomolov Jr. (quarterfinals)

== Draw ==
=== Key ===
- Q = Qualifier
- WC = Wild card
- LL = Lucky loser
- Alt = Alternate
- SE = Special exempt
- PR = Protected ranking
- ITF = ITF entry
- JE = Junior exempt
- w/o = Walkover
- r = Retired
- d = Defaulted
- SR = Special ranking

=== Finals ===
Semifinals
1	(Cyprus) Marcos Baghdatis	4	6	7^{7}
(Belgium) Ruben Bemelmans	6	1	6^{4}
4	(Uzbekistan) Farrukh Dustov	7^{7}	6
6/SE	(United Kingdom) James Ward	6^{4}	3

Final
1	(Cyprus) Marcos Baghdatis	7^{8}	6
4	(Uzbekistan) Farrukh Dustov	6^{6}	3

=== Top half ===
First round
1	(Cyprus) M Baghdatis	6	5	7
(Australia) J-P Smith	4	7	5
WC	(United States) A Sarkissian	6	4	3
(United States) C Buchanan	2	6	6
(Japan) T Daniel	7^{8}	6^{4}	6
WC	(Australia) J Thompson	6^{6}	7^{7}	4
(Australia) M Reid	4	7^{7}	5
5	(United Kingdom) D Evans	6	6^{3}	7
3	(Croatia) A Pavić	3	4
(Japan) Y Uchiyama	6	6
(Belgium) R Bemelmans	6	6
(Lithuania) L Grigelis	3	3
(Republic of Ireland) J McGee	4	4
(France) V Millot	6	6
WC	(United States) D Novikov	3	2
8	(Russia) A Bogomolov Jr.	6	6

Second round
1	(Cyprus) M Baghdatis	7^{7}	6
(United States) C Buchanan	6^{5}	3
(Japan) T Daniel	6	7
5	(United Kingdom) D Evans	4	5
(Japan) Y Uchiyama	4	6^{7}
(Belgium) R Bemelmans	6	7^{7}
(France) V Millot	3	2
8	(Russia) A Bogomolov Jr.	6	6

Quarterfinals
1	(Cyprus) M Baghdatis	6	7^{7}
(Japan) T Daniel	4	6^{2}
(Belgium) R Bemelmans	6	6
8	(Russia) A Bogomolov Jr.	1	3

Semifinals
1	(Cyprus) M Baghdatis	4	6	7^{7}
(Belgium) R Bemelmans	6	1	6^{4}

=== Bottom half ===
First round
7	(Japan) H Moriya	2	6	2
(United States) A Krajicek	6	4	6
(Japan) T Nishioka	6	6
LL	(France) F Martin	2	4
Q	(United States) M Giron	6^{3}	3
(Argentina) A Collarini	7^{7}	6
(United States) R Williams	0	6	4
4	(Uzbekistan) F Dustov	6	3	6
6/SE	(United Kingdom) J Ward	6	6
Q	(South Africa) F Wolmarans	4	3
(United States) W Odesnik	6	7^{9}
Q	(United States) Connor Smith	3	6^{7}
WC	(South Africa) R de Voest	4	7^{7}	7^{7}
Q	(United States) J Jung	6	6^{4}	6^{4}
SE	(Australia) T Kokkinakis	7	6
2	(Chinese Taipei) J Wang	5	4

Second round
(United States) A Krajicek	6	6
(Japan) T Nishioka	4	4
(Argentina) A Collarini	2	2
4	(Uzbekistan) F Dustov	6	6
6/SE	(United Kingdom) J Ward	w/o
(United States) W Odesnik
WC	(South Africa) R de Voest	4	7^{7}	4
SE	(Australia) T Kokkinakis	6	6^{3}	6

Quarterfinals
(United States) A Krajicek	6	1	0
4	(Uzbekistan) F Dustov	4	6	6
6/SE	(United Kingdom) J Ward	6	6
SE	(Australia) T Kokkinakis	3	4

Semifinals
4	(Uzbekistan) F Dustov	7^{7}	6
6/SE	(United Kingdom) J Ward	6^{4}	3
