= 2014 Odlum Brown Vancouver Open – Women's singles =

Women's singles
- 2014 Odlum Brown Vancouver Open

Final
- Champion: (Australia) Jarmila Gajdošová
- Runner-up: (Ukraine) Lesia Tsurenko
- Score: 3–6, 6–2, 7–6^{(7–3)}

Events
Singles	men	women
Doubles	men	women
← 2013 ·	Vancouver Open	· 2015 →

Johanna Konta was the defending champion, but chose not to participate.

Jarmila Gajdošová won the title, defeating Lesia Tsurenko in the final, 3–6, 6–2, 7–6^{(7–3)}.

== Seeds ==
1. (Hungary) Tímea Babos (quarterfinals)
2. (United States) Grace Min (first round)
3. (United States) Anna Tatishvili (quarterfinals)
4. (Poland) Urszula Radwańska (first round)
5. (Paraguay) Verónica Cepede Royg (second round)
6. (United States) Melanie Oudin (first round)
7. (Estonia) Anett Kontaveit (first round)
8. (United Kingdom) Naomi Broady (first round)

== Draw ==
=== Key ===
- Q = Qualifier
- WC = Wild card
- LL = Lucky loser
- Alt = Alternate
- SE = Special exempt
- PR = Protected ranking
- ITF = ITF entry
- JE = Junior exempt
- w/o = Walkover
- r = Retired
- d = Defaulted
- SR = Special ranking

=== Finals ===
Semifinals
(Ukraine) Lesia Tsurenko	6	6
WC	(United States) Asia Muhammad	4	3
(United States) Madison Brengle	6	2	5
(Australia) Jarmila Gajdošová	3	6	7

Final
(Ukraine) Lesia Tsurenko	6	2	6^{3}
(Australia) Jarmila Gajdošová	3	6	7^{7}

=== Top half ===
First round
1	(Hungary) T Babos	7	6
(Japan) N Hibino	5	0
(Brazil) L Pigossi	1	1
Q	(United States) A Will	6	6
(Switzerland) R Oprandi	6	2	6
WC	(United States) M Sanchez	4	6	4
(Ukraine) L Tsurenko	6	4	7
6	(United States) M Oudin	4	6	5
4	(Poland) U Radwańska	7^{7}	4	3
WC	(United States) A Muhammad	6^{3}	6	6
(Kazakhstan) Y Putintseva	7	6
WC	(Canada) G Liang	5	3
(Japan) E Hozumi	3	1
(Belgium) A-S Mestach	6	6
Q	(United States) J Brady	6	6
8	(United Kingdom) N Broady	3	1

Second round
1	(Hungary) T Babos	7^{7}	6
Q	(United States) A Will	6^{5}	3
(Switzerland) R Oprandi	3	0^{r}
(Ukraine) L Tsurenko	6	3
WC	(United States) A Muhammad	6	6
(Kazakhstan) Y Putintseva	2	2
(Belgium) A-S Mestach	6	4	4
Q	(United States) J Brady	3	6	6

Quarterfinals
1	(Hungary) T Babos	3	1
(Ukraine) L Tsurenko	6	6
WC	(United States) A Muhammad	4	6	7
Q	(United States) J Brady	6	2	5

Semifinals
(Ukraine) L Tsurenko	6	6
WC	(United States) A Muhammad	4	3

=== Bottom half ===
First round
7	(Estonia) A Kontaveit	3	1
(Ukraine) O Savchuk	6	6
(United States) M Brengle	6	6
Q	(United States) S Crawford	1	2
(Japan) R Ozaki	6	6
(Chinese Taipei) C-y Hsu	3	4
WC	(Canada) K Blajkevitch	1	3
3	(United States) A Tatishvili	6	6
5	(Paraguay) V Cepede Royg	7	3	6
Q	(Mexico) M Zacarías	5	6	3
(Netherlands) M Krajicek	2	6	4
(France) I Pavlovic	6	2	6
(United States) J Boserup	6	4	4
(Japan) M Imanishi	3	6	6
(Australia) J Gajdošová	6	6
2	(United States) G Min	0	4

Second round
(Ukraine) O Savchuk	0	1
(United States) M Brengle	6	6
(Japan) R Ozaki	6^{3}	3
3	(United States) A Tatishvili	7^{7}	6
5	(Paraguay) V Cepede Royg	1	7	3
(France) I Pavlovic	6	5	6
(Japan) M Imanishi	4	4
(Australia) J Gajdošová	6	6

Quarterfinals
(United States) M Brengle	6	6
3	(United States) A Tatishvili	4	2
(France) I Pavlovic	2	6^{5}
(Australia) J Gajdošová	6	7^{7}

Semifinals
(United States) M Brengle	6	2	5
(Australia) J Gajdošová	3	6	7
