= 2013 Odlum Brown Vancouver Open – Women's singles =

Women's singles
- 2013 Odlum Brown Vancouver Open

Final
- Champion: (United Kingdom) Johanna Konta
- Runner-up: (Canada) Sharon Fichman
- Score: 6–4, 6–2

Events
Singles	men	women
Doubles	men	women
← 2012 ·	Vancouver Open	· 2014 →

Mallory Burdette was the defending champion, having won the event in 2012, but she decided to participate at the 2013 Southern California Open instead.

Johanna Konta won the tournament, defeating Sharon Fichman in the final, 6–4, 6–2.

== Seeds ==
1. (Chinese Taipei) Hsieh Su-wei (first round)
2. (Japan) Kimiko Date-Krumm (quarterfinals)
3. (Japan) Misaki Doi (second round)
4. (Israel) Julia Glushko (second round)
5. (Japan) Kurumi Nara (semifinals)
6. (Ukraine) Maryna Zanevska (quarterfinals)
7. (Canada) Sharon Fichman (final)
8. (Czech Republic) Barbora Záhlavová-Strýcová (semifinals)

== Main draw ==
=== Key ===
- Q = Qualifier
- WC = Wild card
- LL = Lucky loser
- Alt = Alternate
- SE = Special exempt
- PR = Protected ranking
- ITF = ITF entry
- JE = Junior exempt
- w/o = Walkover
- r = Retired
- d = Defaulted
- SR = Special ranking

=== Finals ===
Semifinals
(United Kingdom) Johanna Konta	7^{7}	6
5	(Japan) Kurumi Nara	6^{1}	0
8	(Czech Republic) Barbora Záhlavová-Strýcová	6	4	4
7	(Canada) Sharon Fichman	1	6	6

Final
(United Kingdom) Johanna Konta	6	6
7	(Canada) Sharon Fichman	4	2

=== Top half ===
First round
1	(Chinese Taipei) S-w Hsieh	6^{5}	4
(United Kingdom) J Konta	7^{7}	6
Q	(United Kingdom) J Windley	6	6
WC	(United States) S Marand	2	4
(Japan) Y Sema	6	6
WC	(United States) N Pluskota	0	2
(Japan) M Eguchi	7	5	2
6	(Ukraine) M Zanevska	5	7	6
3	(Japan) M Doi	6	6
(Japan) E Sema	4	1
(Canada) H El Tabakh	5	3
(Canada) S Dubois	7	6
WC	(Canada) C Zhao	3	6	7^{7}
(Croatia) A Tomljanović	6	3	6^{4}
(Canada) G Dabrowski	1	3
5	(Japan) K Nara	6	6

Second round
(United Kingdom) J Konta	7	2	6
Q	(United Kingdom) J Windley	5	6	4
(Japan) Y Sema	2	2
6	(Ukraine) M Zanevska	6	6
3	(Japan) M Doi	1	4
(Canada) S Dubois	6	6
WC	(Canada) C Zhao	5	4
5	(Japan) K Nara	7	6

Quarterfinals
(United Kingdom) J Konta	6	6
6	(Ukraine) M Zanevska	1	3
(Canada) S Dubois	5	1
5	(Japan) K Nara	7	6

Semifinals
(United Kingdom) J Konta	7^{7}	6
5	(Japan) K Nara	6^{1}	0

=== Bottom half ===
First round
8	(Czech Republic) B Záhlavová-Strýcová	6	6
WC	(Canada) E Fournier	0	1
(United States) C Scholl	0	0
(Japan) R Ozaki	6	6
(France) S Foretz Gacon	3	3
(Russia) A Kudryavtseva	6	6
Q	(United Kingdom) E Webley-Smith	3	2
4	(Israel) J Glushko	6	6
7	(Canada) S Fichman	6	6
(Australia) M Adamczak	0	1
Q	(Japan) M Imanishi	6	6
(United Kingdom) T Moore	2	2
Q	(United Kingdom) N Broady	1	4
(United Kingdom) S Murray	6	6
(Australia) O Rogowska	2	5
2	(Japan) K Date-Krumm	6	7

Second round
8	(Czech Republic) B Záhlavová-Strýcová	6	6^{1}	6
(Japan) R Ozaki	3	7^{7}	2
(Russia) A Kudryavtseva	7	7^{7}
4	(Israel) J Glushko	5	6^{4}
7	(Canada) S Fichman	6	6
Q	(Japan) M Imanishi	2	2
(United Kingdom) S Murray	3	7	6^{4}
2	(Japan) K Date-Krumm	6	5	7^{7}

Quarterfinals
8	(Czech Republic) B Záhlavová-Strýcová	6	6
(Russia) A Kudryavtseva	4	1
7	(Canada) S Fichman	7	6
2	(Japan) K Date-Krumm	5	3

Semifinals
8	(Czech Republic) B Záhlavová-Strýcová	6	4	4
7	(Canada) S Fichman	1	6	6
