= 2013 Odlum Brown Vancouver Open – Men's doubles =

Men's doubles
- 2013 Odlum Brown Vancouver Open

Final
- Champions: (Israel) Jonathan Erlich (Israel) Andy Ram
- Runners-up: (United States) James Cerretani (Canada) Adil Shamasdin
- Score: 6–1, 6–4

Events
Singles	men	women
Doubles	men	women
← 2012 ·	Vancouver Open	· 2014 →

Maxime Authom and Ruben Bemelmans are the defending champions, having won the event in 2012, but lost in the first round.

Jonathan Erlich and Andy Ram won the title, defeating James Cerretani and Adil Shamasdin in the final, 6–1, 6–4.

== Seeds ==
1. (India) Purav Raja / (India) Divij Sharan (quarterfinals)
2. (Australia) Jordan Kerr / (Australia) John-Patrick Smith (first round)
3. (United States) James Cerretani / (Canada) Adil Shamasdin (final)
4. (Israel) Jonathan Erlich / (Israel) Andy Ram (champions)

== Draw ==
=== Key ===
- Q = Qualifier
- WC = Wild card
- LL = Lucky loser
- Alt = Alternate
- SE = Special exempt
- PR = Protected ranking
- ITF = ITF entry
- JE = Junior exempt
- w/o = Walkover
- r = Retired
- d = Defaulted
- SR = Special ranking

First round
1	(India) P Raja (India) D Sharan	6	7^{7}
WC	(Canada) É Chvojka (Canada) P Polansky	3	6^{5}
(Canada) S Diez (United States) W Odesnik	7^{7}	6^{7}	[9]
(Japan) T Ito (Japan) H Moriya	6^{4}	7^{9}	[11]
3	(United States) J Cerretani (Canada) A Shamasdin	6	6
WC	(South Africa) R de Voest (Israel) A Weintraub	3	4
(Chinese Taipei) T Chen (Chinese Taipei) J Wang	3	4
Q	(Croatia) A Pavić (Canada) Milan Pokrajac	6	6
(Belgium) M Authom (Belgium) R Bemelmans	2	3
(United States) A Krajicek (United States) B Reynolds	6	6
(Australia) C Guccione (Australia) M Reid	5	1
4	(Israel) J Erlich (Israel) A Ram	7	6
WC	(Australia) G Jones (United States) T Sandgren	2	2
WC	(France) C Reix (Belgium) O Rochus	6	6
(United States) B Klahn (New Zealand) M Venus	6	4	[10]
2	(Australia) J Kerr (Australia) J-P Smith	4	6	[8]

Quarterfinals
1	(India) P Raja (India) D Sharan	4	6	[8]
(Japan) T Ito (Japan) H Moriya	6	2	[10]
3	(United States) J Cerretani (Canada) A Shamasdin	3	7^{7}	[10]
Q	(Croatia) A Pavić (Canada) M Pokrajac	6	6^{2}	[1]
(United States) A Krajicek (United States) B Reynolds	7^{7}	3	[5]
4	(Israel) J Erlich (Israel) A Ram	6^{5}	6	[10]
WC	(France) C Reix (Belgium) O Rochus	2	3
(United States) B Klahn (New Zealand) M Venus	6	6

Semifinals
(Japan) T Ito (Japan) H Moriya	3	3
3	(United States) J Cerretani (Canada) A Shamasdin	6	6
4	(Israel) J Erlich (Israel) A Ram	6	3	[10]
(United States) B Klahn (New Zealand) M Venus	3	6	[6]

Final
3	(United States) J Cerretani (Canada) A Shamasdin	1	4
4	(Israel) J Erlich (Israel) A Ram	6	6
