= 2014 Odlum Brown Vancouver Open – Men's doubles =

Men's doubles
- 2014 Odlum Brown Vancouver Open

Final
- Champions: (United States) Austin Krajicek (Australia) John-Patrick Smith
- Runners-up: (New Zealand) Marcus Daniell (New Zealand) Artem Sitak
- Score: 6–3, 4–6, [10–8]

Events
Singles	men	women
Doubles	men	women
← 2013 ·	Vancouver Open	· 2015 →

Jonathan Erlich and Andy Ram were the defending champions, but decided not to participate this year.

Austin Krajicek and John-Patrick Smith won the title, defeating Marcus Daniell and Artem Sitak 6–3, 4–6, [10–8] in the final.

== Seeds ==
1. (United States) Austin Krajicek / (Australia) John-Patrick Smith (champions)
2. (Canada) Adil Shamasdin / (India) Divij Sharan (first round)
3. (New Zealand) Marcus Daniell / (New Zealand) Artem Sitak (final)
4. (Australia) Jordan Kerr / (France) Fabrice Martin (quarterfinals)

== Draw ==
=== Key ===
- Q = Qualifier
- WC = Wild card
- LL = Lucky loser
- Alt = Alternate
- ITF = ITF entry
- PR = Protected ranking
- SR = Special ranking
- SE = Special exempt
- JE = Junior exempt
- JR = Junior Accelerator Programme entrant
- CO = College Accelerator Programme entrant
- NG = Next Gen Accelerator Program entrant
- w/o = Walkover
- r = Retired
- d = Defaulted

=== Draw ===
First round
1	(United States) A Krajicek (Australia) J-P Smith	4	6	[10]
(Croatia) A Pavić (Chinese Taipei) J Wang	6	3	[3]
WC	(United States) J Jung (United States) E King	4	6	[10]
(Belgium) R Bemelmans (France) V Millot	6	3	[6]
4	(Australia) J Kerr (France) F Martin	6	7^{7}
(Uzbekistan) F Dustov (India) P Raja	3	6^{4}
WC	(South Africa) R de Voest (United States) M Seeberger	4	2
(United States) C Buchanan (United States) R Williams	6	6
(Argentina) A Collarini (United States) W Odesnik	1	4
(Australia) M Reid (Australia) L Saville	6	6
(Japan) T Daniel (Japan) H Moriya	1	1
3	(New Zealand) M Daniell (New Zealand) A Sitak	6	6
Q	(United Kingdom) Richard Gabb (Japan) Bumpei Sato	7	3	[7]
WC	(Australia) T Kokkinakis (Australia) J Thompson	3	6	[10]
(Russia) A Bogomolov Jr. (United States) J Cerretani	4	6	[10]
2	(Canada) A Shamasdin (India) D Sharan	6	4	[8]

Quarterfinals
1	(United States) A Krajicek (Australia) J-P Smith	6	6
WC	(United States) J Jung (United States) E King	3	2
4	(Australia) J Kerr (France) F Martin	4	6	[14]
(United States) C Buchanan (United States) R Williams	6	2	[16]
(Australia) M Reid (Australia) L Saville
3	(New Zealand) M Daniell (New Zealand) A Sitak	w/o
WC	(Australia) T Kokkinakis (Australia) J Thompson	6	4	[8]
(Russia) A Bogomolov Jr. (United States) J Cerretani	2	6	[10]

Semifinals
1	(United States) A Krajicek (Australia) J-P Smith	4	6	[11]
(United States) C Buchanan (United States) R Williams	6	3	[9]
3	(New Zealand) M Daniell (New Zealand) A Sitak	6	7^{7}
(Russia) A Bogomolov Jr. (United States) J Cerretani	3	6^{4}

Final
1	(United States) A Krajicek (Australia) J-P Smith	6	4	[10]
3	(New Zealand) M Daniell (New Zealand) A Sitak	3	6	[8]
