= 2013 Odlum Brown Vancouver Open – Men's singles =

Men's singles
- 2013 Odlum Brown Vancouver Open

Final
- Champion: (Canada) Vasek Pospisil
- Runner-up: (United Kingdom) Daniel Evans
- Score: 6–0, 1–6, 7–5

Events
Singles	men	women
Doubles	men	women
← 2012 ·	Vancouver Open	· 2014 →

Igor Sijsling is the defending champion, having won the event in 2012, but decided not to participate this year.

Vasek Pospisil won the title after defeating Daniel Evans 6–0, 1–6, 7–5 in the final.

== Seeds ==
1. (Russia) Evgeny Donskoy (first round)
2. (Canada) Vasek Pospisil (champion)
3. (Germany) Benjamin Becker (second round)
4. (United States) Wayne Odesnik (quarterfinals, retired)
5. (United States) Bobby Reynolds (semifinals)
6. (Chinese Taipei) Jimmy Wang (semifinals)
7. (Germany) Mischa Zverev (first round)
8. (Belgium) Olivier Rochus (quarterfinals)

== Main draw ==
=== Key ===
- Q = Qualifier
- WC = Wild card
- LL = Lucky loser
- Alt = Alternate
- SE = Special exempt
- PR = Protected ranking
- ITF = ITF entry
- JE = Junior exempt
- w/o = Walkover
- r = Retired
- d = Defaulted
- SR = Special ranking

=== Semifinals and final ===
Semifinals
(United Kingdom) Daniel Evans	6	6
5	(United States) Bobby Reynolds	3	4
6	(Chinese Taipei) Jimmy Wang	3	4
2	(Canada) Vasek Pospisil	6	6

Final
(United Kingdom) Daniel Evans	0	6	5
2	(Canada) Vasek Pospisil	6	1	7

=== Top half ===
First round
1	(Russia) E Donskoy	6	4	4
(United Kingdom) D Evans	3	6	6
(Israel) A Weintraub	6	3	6
Q	(Australia) J-P Smith	3	6	2
(Canada) S Diez	6	6
(Australia) M Reid	4	2
WC	(Canada) P Bester	4	7^{7}	3
8	(Belgium) O Rochus	6	6^{5}	6
3	(Germany) B Becker	7^{7}	6
(Canada) P Polansky	6^{4}	4
WC	(Canada) F Dancevic	6	6
SE	(Canada) F Peliwo	3	4
(Belgium) R Bemelmans	6	6
WC	(United States) A Krajicek	2	4
(Australia) M Barton	1	3
5	(United States) B Reynolds	6	6

Second round
(United Kingdom) D Evans	6	3	6
(Israel) A Weintraub	2	6	3
(Canada) S Diez	4	2
8	(Belgium) O Rochus	6	6
3	(Germany) B Becker	6^{4}	7	5^{7}
WC	(Canada) F Dancevic	7^{7}	5	7^{9}
(Belgium) R Bemelmans	5	4
5	(United States) B Reynolds	7	6

Quarterfinals
(United Kingdom) D Evans	6	6
8	(Belgium) O Rochus	4	2
(Canada) F Dancevic	0	3
5	(United States) B Reynolds	6	6

Semifinals
(United Kingdom) D Evans	6	6
5	(United States) B Reynolds	3	4

=== Bottom half ===
First round
6	(Chinese Taipei) J Wang	6	6
Q	(Australia) B Mitchell	3	4
(Belgium) M Authhom	1	4
(Japan) T Ito	6	6
(Japan) H Moriya	7^{7}	7
WC	(United States) T Sandgren	6^{4}	5
(South Africa) R de Voest	5	2
4	(United States) W Odesnik	7	6
7	(Germany) M Zverev	7	6^{1}	6^{2}
(Australia) G Jones	5	7^{7}	7^{7}
Q	(Republic of Ireland) J McGee	6	3	5
SE	(United Kingdom) J Ward	4	6	7
(United States) B Klahn	6	6
Q	(United States) N Meister	1	4
(Chinese Taipei) T Chen	4	6^{0}
2	(Canada) V Pospisil	6	7^{7}

Second round
6	(Chinese Taipei) J Wang	7	7^{7}
(Japan) T Ito	5	6^{1}
(Japan) H Moriya	6	3	0
4	(United States) W Odesnik	3	6	6
(Australia) G Jones	6	7^{7}
SE	(United Kingdom) J Ward	1	6^{4}
(United States) B Klahn	4	4
2	(Canada) V Pospisil	6	6

Quarterfinals
6	(Chinese Taipei) J Wang	7	0
4	(United States) W Odesnik	5	0^{r}
(Australia) G Jones	5	4
2	(Canada) V Pospisil	7	6

Semifinals
6	(Chinese Taipei) J Wang	3	4
2	(Canada) V Pospisil	6	6
