= 2014 ASB Classic – Doubles =

Doubles
- 2014 ASB Classic

Final
- Champion: (Canada) Sharon Fichman (United States) Maria Sanchez
- Runner-up: (Czech Republic) Lucie Hradecká (Netherlands) Michaëlla Krajicek
- Score: 2–6, 6–0, [10–4]

Details
- Draw: 16
- Seeds: 4

Events
Singles	Doubles
← 2013 ·	WTA Auckland Open	· 2015 →

Cara Black and Anastasia Rodionova were the defending champions, but Rodionova decided to compete in Brisbane instead. Black partnered up with Marina Erakovic, but they lost in the first round to Abigail Guthrie and Sacha Jones.
Sharon Fichman and Maria Sanchez won the title, defeating Lucie Hradecká and Michaëlla Krajicek in the final, 2–6, 6–0, [10–4].

== Seeds ==
1. (Czech Republic) Andrea Hlaváčková / (Czech Republic) Lucie Šafářová (quarterfinals)
2. (Zimbabwe) Cara Black / (New Zealand) Marina Erakovic (first round)
3. (Czech Republic) Lucie Hradecká / (Netherlands) Michaëlla Krajicek (final)
4. (Germany) Mona Barthel / (United States) Megan Moulton-Levy (semifinals)

== Draw ==
=== Key ===
- Q = Qualifier
- WC = Wild card
- LL = Lucky loser
- Alt = Alternate
- SE = Special exempt
- PR = Protected ranking
- ITF = ITF entry
- JE = Junior exempt
- w/o = Walkover
- r = Retired
- d = Defaulted
- SR = Special ranking

=== Draw ===
First round
1	(Czech Republic) A Hlaváčková (Czech Republic) L Šafářová	6	7^{7}
(South Africa) N Grandin (Austria) S Klemenschits	4	6^{3}
(Poland) P Kania (Russia) V Solovyeva	5	6^{5}
(Canada) S Fichman (United States) M Sanchez	7	7^{7}
4	(Germany) M Barthel (United States) M Moulton-Levy	4	6	[10]
(Ukraine) Y Beygelzimer (Argentina) M Irigoyen	6	3	[8]
(Germany) K Barrois (Czech Republic) R Voráčová	5	7	[4]
(Chinese Taipei) C-w Chan (China) Y Xu	7	5	[10]
(United States) I Falconi (Czech Republic) E Hrdinová	6	3	[9]
WC	(Belgium) K Flipkens (Serbia) A Ivanovic	4	6	[11]
(Spain) L Domínguez Lino (Spain) G Muguruza	1	2
3	(Czech Republic) L Hradecká (Netherlands) M Krajicek	6	6
(Austria) T Paszek (United States) C Vandeweghe	5	6	[7]
(Czech Republic) Ka Plíšková (Czech Republic) Kr Plíšková	7	3	[10]
WC	(New Zealand) A Guthrie (Australia) S Jones	3	6	[13]
2	(Zimbabwe) C Black (New Zealand) M Erakovic	6	4	[11]

Quarterfinals
1	(Czech Republic) A Hlaváčková (Czech Republic) L Šafářová	6^{6}	4
(Canada) S Fichman (United States) M Sanchez	7	6
4	(Germany) M Barthel (United States) M Moulton-Levy	6	7
(Chinese Taipei) C-w Chan (China) Y Xu	1	5
WC	(Belgium) K Flipkens (Serbia) A Ivanovic	6	4	[3]
3	(Czech Republic) L Hradecká (Netherlands) M Krajicek	3	6	[10]
(Czech Republic) Ka Plíšková (Czech Republic) Kr Plíšková	6	6
WC	(New Zealand) A Guthrie (Australia) S Jones	4	1

Semifinals
(Canada) S Fichman (United States) M Sanchez	6	6
4	(Germany) M Barthel (United States) M Moulton-Levy	2	4
3	(Czech Republic) L Hradecká (Netherlands) M Krajicek	6	6
(Czech Republic) Ka Plíšková (Czech Republic) Kr Plíšková	3	1

Final
(Canada) S Fichman (United States) M Sanchez	2	6	[10]
3	(Czech Republic) L Hradecká (Netherlands) M Krajicek	6	0	[4]
