= 2012 Cooper Challenger – Singles =

Singles
- 2012 Cooper Challenger

Final
- Champion: (Canada) Sharon Fichman
- Runner-up: (Israel) Julia Glushko
- Score: 6–3, 6–2

Events
Singles	Doubles
- Waterloo Challenger

Sharon Fichman was the defending champion and won the title again with a 6–3, 6–2 win over Julia Glushko.

== Seeds ==
1. (Canada) Sharon Fichman (champion)
2. (Israel) Julia Glushko (final)
3. (Japan) Misa Eguchi (quarterfinals)
4. (Canada) Marie-Ève Pelletier (semifinals)
5. (Japan) Rika Fujiwara (quarterfinals)
6. (Venezuela) Gabriela Paz (first round)
7. (Austria) Nicole Rottmann (quarterfinals)
8. (Austria) Tina Schiechtl (second round)

== Main draw ==
Key

- Q = Qualifier
- WC = Wild card
- LL = Lucky loser
- Alt = Alternate
- ITF = ITF entry
- PR = Protected ranking
- SR = Special ranking
- SE = Special exempt
- JE = Junior exempt
- JR = Junior Accelerator Programme entrant
- CO = College Accelerator Programme entrant
- NG = Next Gen Accelerator Program entrant
- w/o = Walkover
- r = Retired
- d = Defaulted

=== Finals ===
Semifinals
1	(Canada) Sharon Fichman	6	7
(United States) Chieh-yu Hsu	2	5
4	(Canada) Marie-Ève Pelletier	1	7	1
2	(Israel) Julia Glushko	6	5	6

Final
1	(Canada) Sharon Fichman	6	6
2	(Israel) Julia Glushko	3	2

=== Top half ===
First round
1	(Canada) S Fichman	6	6
(Japan) S Akita	0	2
Q	(Canada) S Dynka	5	1
(United States) N Melichar	7	6
(Canada) E Routliffe	7	6
Q	(United States) V Corning	5	3
(Russia) N Kukharchuk	6	6
6	(Venezuela) G Paz	3	4
3	(Japan) M Eguchi	6	6
(United States) K Hardebeck	3	2
(Poland) J Jegiołka	2	6	6
(Japan) A Yamasoto	6	2	0
(United States) C-y Hsu	6	6
WC	(Canada) É Abanda	3	1
(Canada) G Dabrowski	4	7^{7}	2
8	(Austria) T Schiechtl	6	6^{4}	6

Second round
1	(Canada) S Fichman	6	6
(United States) N Melichar	2	1
(Canada) E Routliffe	3	6	4
(Russia) N Kukharchuk	6	0	6
3	(Japan) M Eguchi	6	6
(Poland) J Jegiołka	2	4
(United States) C-y Hsu	6	6
8	(Austria) T Schiechtl	4	0

Quarterfinals
1	(Canada) S Fichman	6	6
(Russia) N Kukharchuk	0	4
3	(Japan) M Eguchi	3	3
(United States) C-y Hsu	6	6

Semifinals
1	(Canada) S Fichman	6	7
(United States) C-y Hsu	2	5

=== Bottom half ===
First round
5	(Japan) R Fujiwara	6	6
(Japan) S Aoyama	4	2
WC	(Canada) M Jodoin	6	6
WC	(Canada) S Wetmore	2	2
(United States) N Echeverria Alam	2	3
(United States) A Mueller	6	6
(Canada) C Zhao	3	1
4	(Canada) M-È Pelletier	6	6
7	(Austria) N Rottmann	7	6
(Japan) M Miyamura	5	3
Q	(United States) E Clark	3	4
Q	(France) S Benamar	6	6
WC	(Canada) S Molnar	4	2
(United States) J Elie	6	6
(Oman) F Al Nabhani	4	4
2	(Israel) J Glushko	6	6

Second round
5	(Japan) R Fujiwara	4	6	6
WC	(Canada) M Jodoin	6	2	3
(United States) A Mueller	3	0
4	(Canada) M-È Pelletier	6	6
7	(Austria) N Rottmann	6	6
Q	(France) S Benamar	3	4
(United States) J Elie	0	2
2	(Israel) J Glushko	6	6

Quarterfinals
5	(Japan) R Fujiwara	4	2
4	(Canada) M-È Pelletier	6	6
7	(Austria) N Rottmann	1	3
2	(Israel) J Glushko	6	6

Semifinals
4	(Canada) M-È Pelletier	1	7	1
2	(Israel) J Glushko	6	5	6
