= 2012 Cooper Challenger – Doubles =

Doubles
- 2012 Cooper Challenger

Final
- Champions: (Canada) Sharon Fichman (Canada) Marie-Ève Pelletier
- Runners-up: (Japan) Shuko Aoyama (Canada) Gabriela Dabrowski
- Score: 6–2, 7–5

Events
Singles	Doubles
- Waterloo Challenger

Alexandra Mueller and Asia Muhammed were the defending champions, but Muhammed chose not to participate. Mueller partners up with Julia Glushko.
Canadians Sharon Fichman and Marie-Ève Pelletier defeated Shuko Aoyama and Gabriela Dabrowski 6–2, 7–5 in the final.

== Seeds ==
1. (Canada) Sharon Fichman / (Canada) Marie-Ève Pelletier (champions)
2. (Japan) Shuko Aoyama / (Canada) Gabriela Dabrowski (final)
3. (Israel) Julia Glushko / (United States) Alexandra Mueller (semifinals)
4. (United States) Jennifer Elie / (Poland) Justyna Jegiołka (semifinals)

== Draw ==
Key

- Q = Qualifier
- WC = Wild card
- LL = Lucky loser
- Alt = Alternate
- ITF = ITF entry
- PR = Protected ranking
- SR = Special ranking
- SE = Special exempt
- JE = Junior exempt
- JR = Junior Accelerator Programme entrant
- CO = College Accelerator Programme entrant
- NG = Next Gen Accelerator Program entrant
- w/o = Walkover
- r = Retired
- d = Defaulted

=== Draw ===
First round
1	(Canada) S Fichman (Canada) M-È Pelletier	6	6
(Japan) S Akita (Japan) A Yamasoto	1	2
(Canada) E Routliffe (Canada) C Zhao	4	2
WC	(Canada) M Jodoin (Canada) S Molnar	6	6
3	(Israel) J Glushko (United States) A Mueller	6	6
WC	(Canada) É Abanda (Canada) S Wetmore	1	1
(United States) C-y Hsu (Venezuela) G Paz	6	6
(United States) E Clark (Republic of Ireland) J Moriarty	2	1
(United States) V Corning (United States) N Robinson	6	6
WC	(Canada) D Chypyha (Canada) L Chypyha	0	1
(United Kingdom) L Deigman (The Bahamas) S Pratt	6^{7}	5
4	(United States) J Elie (Poland) J Jegiołka	7^{7}	7
(Japan) M Eguchi (Japan) M Miyamura	6	6
(United States) N Echeverria Alam (United States) D Mills	1	3
(Oman) F Al Nabhani (United States) N Melichar	2	2
2	(Japan) S Aoyama (Canada) G Dabrowski	6	6

Quarterfinals
1	(Canada) S Fichman (Canada) M-È Pelletier	6	6
WC	(Canada) M Jodoin (Canada) S Molnar	1	4
3	(Israel) J Glushko (United States) A Mueller	w/o
(United States) C-y Hsu (Venezuela) G Paz
(United States) V Corning (United States) N Robinson	6^{4}	1
4	(United States) J Elie (Poland) J Jegiołka	7^{7}	6
(Japan) M Eguchi (Japan) M Miyamura	2	5
2	(Japan) S Aoyama (Canada) G Dabrowski	6	7

Semifinals
1	(Canada) S Fichman (Canada) M-È Pelletier	6	6
3	(Israel) J Glushko (United States) A Mueller	4	3
4	(United States) J Elie (Poland) J Jegiołka	7^{8}	4	[5]
2	(Japan) S Aoyama (Canada) G Dabrowski	6^{6}	6	[10]

Finals
1	(Canada) S Fichman (Canada) M-È Pelletier	6	7
2	(Japan) S Aoyama (Canada) G Dabrowski	2	5
