= Claudia Williams (tennis) =

New Zealand tennis player

- Country (sports): New Zealand
- Born: 29 February 1996 (age 29); Wellington, New Zealand
- Prize money: $11,503

Singles
- Career record: 28–60
- Career titles: 0
- Highest ranking: No. 873 (8 June 2015)

Doubles
- Career record: 31–43
- Career titles: 1 ITF
- Highest ranking: No. 702 (29 December 2014)

Claudia Williams (born 29 February 1996) is a New Zealand tennis player.

In her career, Williams won one doubles title on the ITF Women's Circuit. On 8 June 2015, she reached her best singles ranking of world No. 873. On 29 December 2014, she peaked at No. 702 in the doubles rankings.

Williams made her WTA Tour debut at the 2013 Auckland Open.

Her last pro match was a doubles semifinal in a $15k event in Cúcuta, Colombia in November 2018.

== ITF finals ==
=== Doubles (1–2) ===
Legend $10,000 tournaments	Finals by surface Hard (1–2)

Outcome	No.	Date	Tournament	Surface	Partner	Opponents	Score
Runner-up	1.	4 August 2014	Sharm El Sheikh, Egypt	Hard	(United Kingdom) Harriet Dart	(Serbia) Vojislava Lukić (Japan) Haine Ogata	4–6, 2–6
Winner	1.	18 August 2014	Sharm El Sheikh, Egypt	Hard	(Australia) Abbie Myers	(Belgium) Britt Geukens (Italy) Jasmin Ladurner	6–0, 4–6, [10–5]
Runner-up	2.	27 July 2015	Istanbul, Turkey	Hard	(Netherlands) Nikki Luttikhuis	(Sweden) Anette Munozova (Bulgaria) Julia Stamatova	4–6, 3–6
