= 2013 ASB Classic =

- Date: 31 December 2012 – 6 January 2013
- Edition: 28th
- Draw: 32S / 16D
- Prize money: $235,000
- Surface: Hard
- Location: Auckland, New Zealand
- Venue: ASB Tennis Centre

Champions

Singles
- (Poland) Agnieszka Radwańska

Doubles
- (Zimbabwe) Cara Black / (Australia) Anastasia Rodionova
- WTA Auckland Open

The 2013 ASB Classic was a women's tennis tournament played on outdoor hard courts. It was the 28th edition of the ASB Classic, and was part of the WTA International tournaments of the 2013 WTA Tour. It took place at the ASB Tennis Centre in Auckland, New Zealand, from 31 December 2012 to 6 January 2013.

== Finals ==
=== Singles ===
(Poland) Agnieszka Radwańska defeated (Belgium) Yanina Wickmayer 6–4, 6–4

- It was Radwańska's 11th career title, tying her with Ana Ivanovic and Anabel Medina Garrigues for 10th most among active players.

=== Doubles ===
- (Zimbabwe) Cara Black / (Australia) Anastasia Rodionova defeated (Germany) Julia Görges / (Kazakhstan) Yaroslava Shvedova 2–6, 6–2, [10–5]

== See also ==
- 2013 Heineken Open – men's tournament

== Singles main-draw entrants ==
=== Seeds ===
Country	Player	Rank^{1}	Seed
POL	Agnieszka Radwańska	4	1
GER	Julia Görges	18	2
BEL	Yanina Wickmayer	23	3
CHN	Zheng Jie	26	4
ROU	Sorana Cîrstea	27	5
KAZ	Yaroslava Shvedova	29	6
USA	Christina McHale	33	7
GER	Mona Barthel	39	8

- ^{1} Rankings as of 24 December 2012

=== Other entrants ===
The following players received wildcards into the singles main draw:

- (Greece) Eleni Daniilidou
- (United States) CoCo Vandeweghe
- (Canada) Eugenie Bouchard

The following players received entry from the qualifying draw:

- (Canada) Stéphanie Dubois
- (Thailand) Nudnida Luangnam
- (United States) Grace Min
- (Latvia) Anastasija Sevastova

The following player received entry as lucky loser:

- (Hungary) Gréta Arn

=== Withdrawals ===
Before the tournament

- (Czech Republic) Petra Cetkovská
- (France) Kristina Mladenovic
- (Slovenia) Polona Hercog
- (Russia) Vera Zvonareva (shoulder injury)

=== Retirements ===
- (Romania) Sorana Cîrstea (illness)

== Doubles main-draw entrants ==
=== Seeds ===
Country	Player	Country	Player	Rank^{1}	Seed
GER	Julia Görges	KAZ	Yaroslava Shvedova	47	1
NZL	Marina Erakovic	GBR	Heather Watson	104	2
LAT	Līga Dekmeijere	USA	Megan Moulton-Levy	157	3
USA	Jill Craybas	GRE	Eleni Daniilidou	171	4

- ^{1} Rankings as of 24 December 2012
