= Waterloo Challenger =

Cooper Challenger

ITF Women's Tour
- Founded: 2008
- Abolished: 2013
- Location: Waterloo, Ontario, Canada
- Venue: Waterloo Tennis Club
- Category: ITF Women's Circuit
- Surface: Clay – outdoors
- Draw: 32S (32Q) / 16D (0Q)
- Prize money: US$50,000
- Website: Official website

The Waterloo Challenger, last sponsored as Cooper Challenger (also previously known as the WOW Tennis Challenger from 2008 to 2011), was a professional tennis tournament played on outdoor clay courts. The event was classified as a $50,000 ITF Women's Circuit tournament and was held in Waterloo, Ontario, Canada from 2008 to 2013.

== Past finals ==
=== Singles ===
Year	Champions	Runners-up	Score
2013	(Israel) Julia Glushko	(Canada) Gabriela Dabrowski	6–1, 6–3
2012	(Canada) Sharon Fichman	(Israel) Julia Glushko	6–3, 6–2
2011	(Canada) Sharon Fichman	(United States) Julia Boserup	6–3, 4–6, 6–4
2010	(United States) Julia Cohen	(Oman) Fatma Al-Nabhani	1–6, 7–5, 7–5
2009	(Australia) Johanna Konta	(Canada) Heidi El Tabakh	6–2, 3–6, 6–3
2008	(United States) Alexandra Mueller	(Canada) Sharon Fichman	6–3, 6–3

=== Doubles ===
Year	Champions	Runners-up	Score
2013	(Canada) Gabriela Dabrowski (Canada) Sharon Fichman	(Japan) Misa Eguchi (Japan) Eri Hozumi	7–6^{(8–6)}, 6–3
2012	(Canada) Sharon Fichman (Canada) Marie-Ève Pelletier	(Japan) Shuko Aoyama (Canada) Gabriela Dabrowski	6–2, 7–5
2011	(United States) Alexandra Mueller (United States) Asia Muhammad	(Canada) Eugenie Bouchard (United States) Megan Moulton-Levy	6–3, 3–6, [10–7]
2010	(Canada) Élisabeth Abanda (Canada) Katarena Paliivets	(United States) Lauren Albanese (United States) Hsu Chieh-yu	Walkover
2009	(United States) Alexandra Mueller (United States) Allie Will	(Canada) Heidi El Tabakh (Ukraine) Tetiana Luzhanska	6–2, 6–1
2008	(Japan) Akiko Yonemura (Japan) Tomoko Yonemura	(United States) Lauren Albanese (United States) Alexandra Mueller	6–1, 4–6, [10–3]
