= Marianne Jodoin =

Canadian tennis player (born 1993)

- Country (sports): Canada
- Born: January 12, 1993 (age 32)
- Height: 5 ft 7 in (170 cm)
- Plays: Right-handed
- Prize money: $7,860

Singles
- Highest ranking: No. 835 (Jul 16, 2012)

Doubles
- Highest ranking: No. 491 (Oct 25, 2010)

Marianne Jodoin (born January 12, 1993) is a Canadian former professional tennis player. She was doubles champion at the $50,000 Toronto Challenger in 2009 (with Maureen Drake).

Jodoin grew up in Varennes and had her breakthrough in junior tennis when she won the Canadian national U-16 indoor championships. In 2010 she qualified for the junior draw of the Australian Open and represented Canada at the Summer Youth Olympics in Singapore. For the next four years she played collegiate tennis in the United States, for Fresno State and Duke University. She went on to pursue postgraduate studies back in Canada instead of a career in professional tennis.

== ITF Circuit finals ==
=== Doubles: 1 (1–0) ===
| Outcome | Date | Tournament | Tier | Surface | Partner | Opponents | Score |
|---|---|---|---|---|---|---|---|
| Win | Nov 2009 | Toronto Challenger, Canada | 50K | Hard | (Canada) Maureen Drake | (Canada) Sharon Fichman (United States) Mashona Washington | 2–3 ret. |
