= Sharon Fichman =

Canadian tennis player

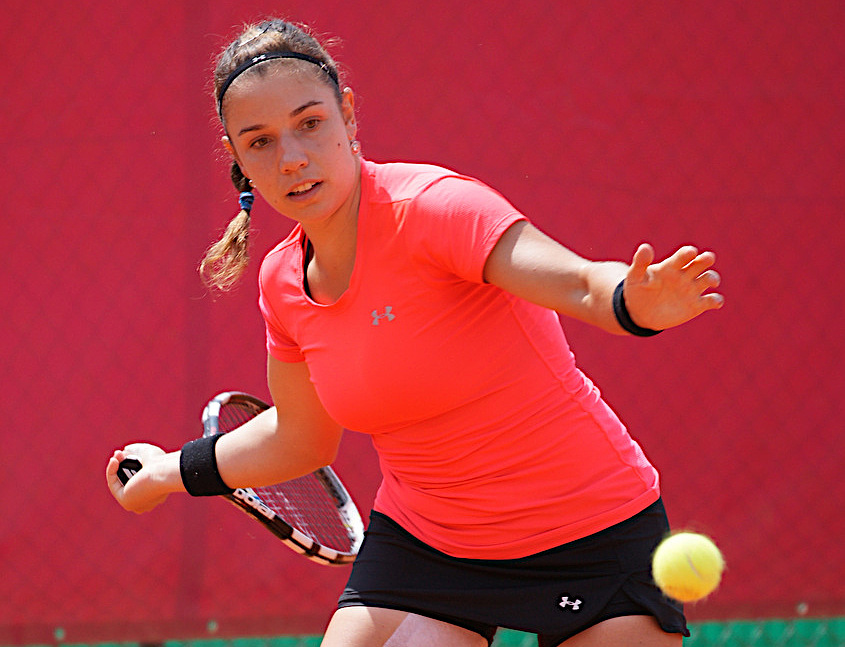
- Sharon Fichman at Cagnes-sur-Mer, 2013
- Country (sports): Canada
- Residence: Toronto, Ontario
- Born: December 3, 1990 (age 35) Toronto
- Height: 1.63 m (5 ft 4 in)
- Turned pro: 2009
- Retired: October 2024
- Plays: Right (two-handed backhand)
- Prize money: $936,706

Singles
- Career record: 299–196
- Career titles: 9 ITF
- Highest ranking: No. 77 (May 19, 2014)

Grand Slam singles results
- Australian Open: Q2 (2010)
- French Open: 1R (2014)
- Wimbledon: 1R (2014)
- US Open: 1R (2013, 2014)

Doubles
- Career record: 289–197
- Career titles: 4 WTA, 21 ITF
- Highest ranking: No. 21 (January 17, 2022)

Grand Slam doubles results
- Australian Open: QF (2021)
- French Open: 3R (2021)
- Wimbledon: 3R (2021)
- US Open: 2R (2013)

Other doubles tournaments
- Tour Finals: RR (2021)
- Olympic Games: 1R (2021)

Grand Slam mixed doubles results
- Wimbledon: 2R (2021)

Team competitions
- Fed Cup: 24–10
Medal record
Representing Canada
Women's tennis
Maccabiah Games
Gold medal – first place	2005 Israel	Singles
Silver medal – second place	2005 Israel	Mixed doubles
Bronze medal – third place	2005 Israel	Doubles

Sharon Fichman (/ˈfɪtʃmən/ FITCH-mən; born December 3, 1990) is a Canadian former tennis player. She achieved career-high WTA rankings of 77 in singles (May 2014) and 21 in doubles (January 2022).

In 2005, Fichman won the gold medal in women's singles at the 2005 Maccabiah Games in Israel, at the age of 14. She was ranked No. 5 on the ITF Junior Circuit in December 2006.

Fichman was inactive from May 2016 to April 2018, but returned to tennis in doubles at the 60k event in Indian Harbour Beach, reaching the quarterfinals with Jamie Loeb. She qualified for the 2021 WTA Finals with Giuliana Olmos.

== Personal life ==
Fichman, who is Jewish, was born and raised in Forest Hill in Toronto, Canada. She is a citizen of both Canada and Israel. Her parents, Julia and Bobby, emigrated from Romania to Israel in 1982, and then to Canada in 1989. Bobby was a semi-pro tennis player, and is now a nuclear engineer. Her mother is a computer engineer and also a tennis fan.

Fichman started playing tennis at the age of four, and won her first tournament at six. By age 13, she was the world No. 2 player under-14. In 2004, at the age of 13, she was Canada's Under-18 Indoor & Outdoor National girls' champion, and also won the doubles title with partner Mélanie Gloria. In 2006, Fichman and Anastasia Pavlyuchenkova dominated doubles at the Grand Slam juniors by winning the Australian Open and French Open. At the 2006 US Open, Fichman reached the quarterfinals in girls' singles and came close to capturing her third major title in doubles with a finalist showing. She lost in the finals of the Canadian Open Junior Championship in both singles and doubles. She attended Forest Hill Collegiate Institute, a public high school, which she graduated from in July 2008.

Fichman's idol at the beginning was Belgian tennis player Justine Henin.

== Career ==
=== 2005 ===
In 2005, Fichman won the gold medal in women's singles at the 2005 Maccabiah Games in Israel, at the age of 14. She defeated Israeli Julia Glushko in the semifinals and 23-year-old Nicole Ptak of the United States in straight sets in the final. "I represented my religion and my country", she said after beating Ptak. "These Games are not just all about sports but meeting people, learning about culture and building friendship. Being the No. 1 Jewish female tennis player in the world is also not too shabby." Fichman also won a bronze medal in the women's doubles, and wrapped up the event with silver medal in mixed doubles. She was also Canada's flag-bearer at the Games.

=== 2006–10 ===
In October 2006, while still 15, she beat world No. 114, Hana Šromová. In August 2007, at the age of 16, Fichman beat world No. 90, Stéphanie Cohen-Aloro of France in Toronto. She finished 2007 with a singles record for the year of 16–8. In October 2008, 17 years of age, Fichman beat world No. 137, Jelena Pandžić. She finished 2008 with a singles record for the year of 25–16. In January 2009, she won the singles title at the Ace Sports Group Tennis Classic tournament in Lutz, Florida dropping only one set, and also won the doubles title with Kimberly Couts.

In April 2009, she won the Osprey, Florida tournament. Fichman reached the 100k Biella Challenger singles final in September 2009, but lost to Petra Martić. In February 2010 at the Abierto Mexicano, Fichman defeated the first top-50 player when she beat world No. 40, Sorana Cîrstea, in the first round. She also won two 100k doubles titles in July 2010 (in Biarritz and in Pétange).

=== 2011–12 ===
In January 2011, Sharon won her first tournament of the year, the 25k in Plantation, by defeating Alexandra Cadanțu in the final. At the WTA Tour Copa Colsanitas, she reached the second round but lost to Catalina Castaño, despite having two match points in the second set. In July, she won her second tournament of the year at the 50k event in Waterloo, where she defeated Julia Boserup.

In July 2012, Fichman won the Waterloo Challenger for the second straight year with a win over Julia Glushko in the championship match. She won in September the 25k event in Mamaia, defeating Patricia Maria Ţig in the final.

=== 2013 ===
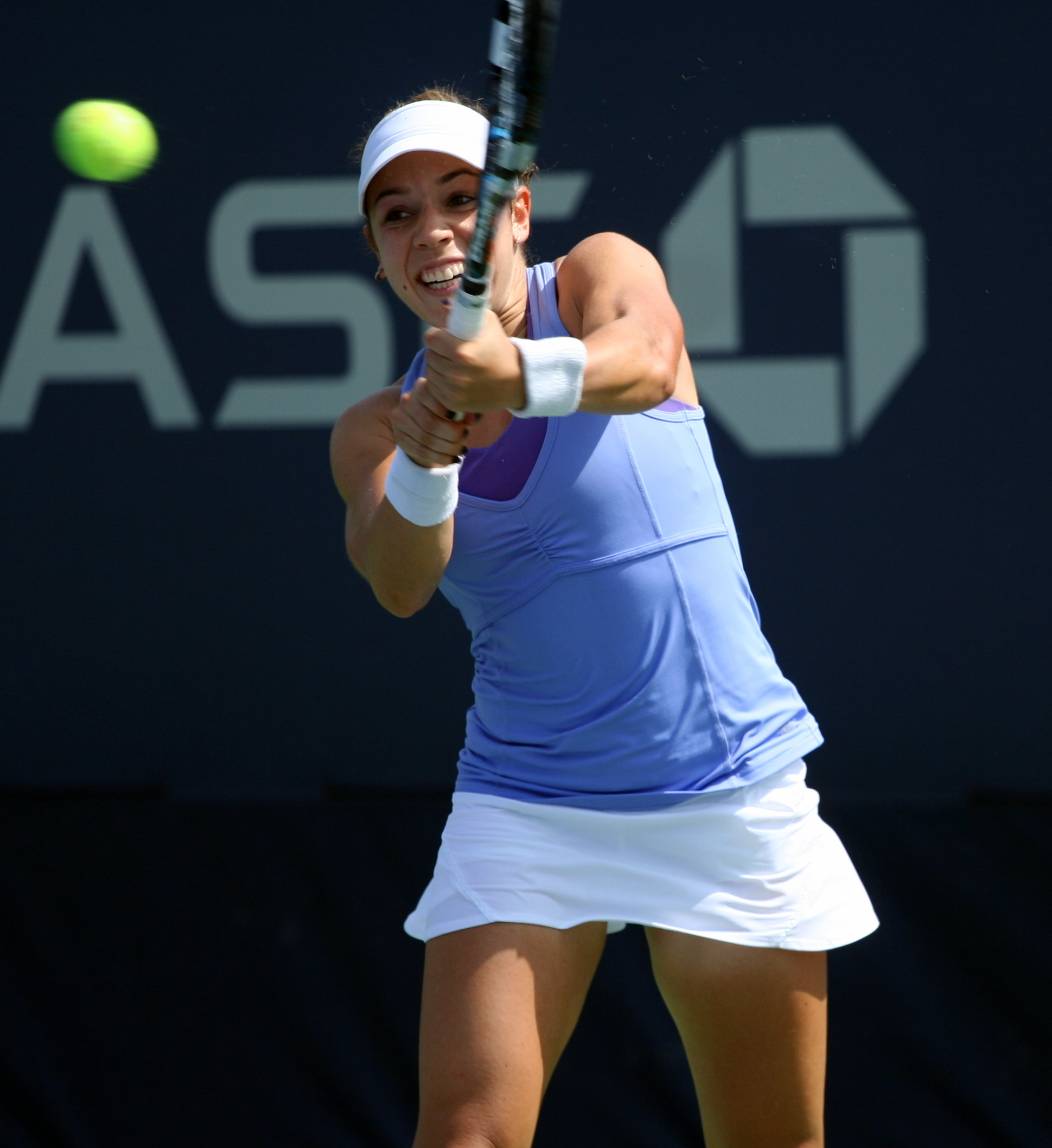
Fichman at the 2013 US Open

At the end of January, Fichman won the eighth singles title of her career at the 25k event in Port St. Lucie, with a victory over Tadeja Majerič. In August, she lost the final of the 100k Vancouver Open to Johanna Konta but won the doubles title alongside Maryna Zanevska. A week later at the Rogers Cup, she reached the second round for the first time of her career in singles, after defeating compatriot Stéphanie Dubois in her opening match. She also made it to the semifinals in doubles with fellow Canadian Gabriela Dabrowski by an upset over first seeds Sara Errani and Roberta Vinci. They were eliminated by Jelena Janković and Katarina Srebotnik.

At the US Open, Fichman qualified for her first-ever Grand Slam main draw with a victory over Alexandra Panova. She lost to world No. 22, Sorana Cîrstea, in the first round. In September, Fichman made it to the Premier Mandatory main draw in Beijing with wins over Paula Ormaechea and Yaroslava Shvedova in first and last round of qualifying, respectively. In the main draw, she was eliminated by Galina Voskoboeva in the first round.

=== 2014 ===
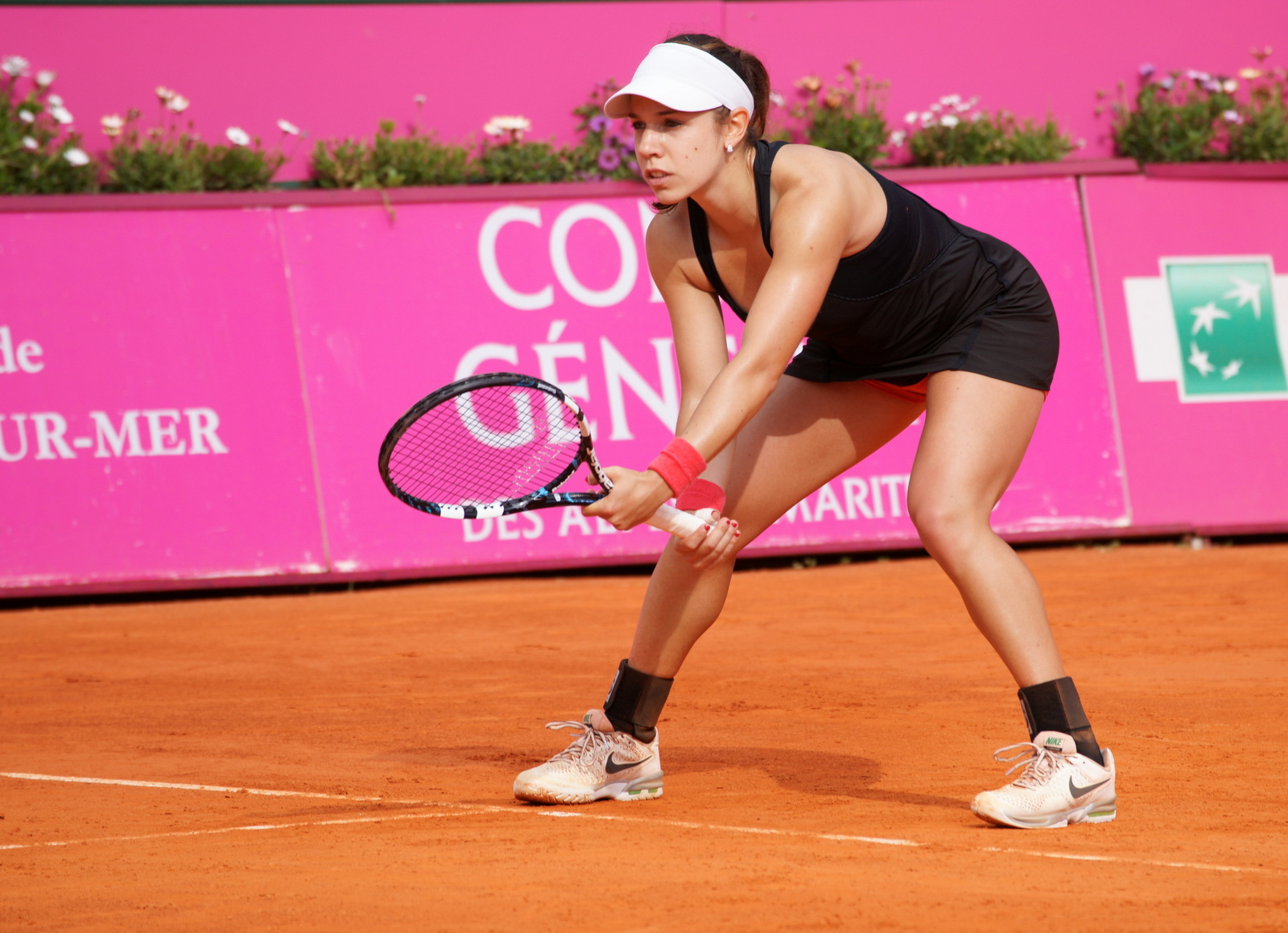
Fichman at the 2014 Open de Cagnes-sur-Mer

At the first tournament of her season, the Auckland Open, Fichman qualified and upset world No. 22, Sorana Cîrstea, in the first round to record the second top-50 win of her career (she also beat Cîrstea in 2010). The same week, she won her first WTA doubles title alongside Maria Sanchez with a victory over Lucie Hradecká and Michaëlla Krajicek in the final. In February, at the 100k event in Midland, Fichman scored her third top-50 win when she beat world No. 45, Urszula Radwańska, to reach the semifinals. She was defeated by Ksenia Pervak in the next round. At the Mexican Open in late February, Fichman upset world No. 39, Yvonne Meusburger, in her opening match to advance to the second round. She lost to Caroline Garcia in her next match.

At the beginning of March, she qualified for the Premier Mandatory Indian Wells Open and defeated Shahar Pe'er in the first round. She was eliminated by world No. 10, Sara Errani, in the second round. In May, Fichman reached her first singles final of the season at the 100k Open de Cagnes-sur-Mer, where she won the biggest tournament of her career so far with a victory over Timea Bacsinszky. At the French Open in May, Fichman earned direct entry in the main draw of a Grand Slam tournament for the first time, but was eliminated in the opening round by world No. 7, Jelena Janković, in three sets. At Wimbledon, Fichman was defeated by Timea Bacsinszky in the first round. At the US Open, her first tournament after having knee surgery at the end of July, she lost to world No. 5, Agnieszka Radwańska, in the opening round.

=== 2015–16 ===
In August 2015 at the Rogers Cup, Fichman reached the quarterfinals in doubles with compatriot Carol Zhao.

She played a match at the 100k event in Trnava in May 2016, losing in the qualifying second round to Ágnes Bukta, and was inactive for nearly two years thereafter, claiming injuries, mental fatigue and a growing interest in broadcasting and coaching made her decide to take a break from playing.

=== 2018 ===
In April 2018, Fichman returned to the pro circuit at age 27, playing in doubles at the 60k event in Indian Harbour Beach. She reached the quarterfinals with partner Jamie Loeb. Fichman credited her return to fiancé Dylan Moscovitch suffering an accident that cut off his chances of qualifying to the 2018 Winter Olympics, making her decide to take up tennis again and rise enough in the rankings to attend the 2020 Summer Olympics and bring Moscovitch along.

=== 2021: Major doubles QF, WTA 1000 title, Olympics ===
Partnering with Mexican player Giuliana Olmos, Fichman reached her first Grand Slam tournament quarterfinal at the Australian Open, where they lost to eventual runners-up, Barbora Krejčíková and Kateřina Siniaková, in three sets.

In May, she won the first WTA 1000 and biggest title in her doubles career at the Italian Open, partnering Olmos. In the final, they defeated Kristina Mladenovic and Markéta Vondroušová. As a result, she entered the top 40 in doubles for the first time in her career at No. 31. The following month, Fichman and Olmos made it through to the third round at French Open.

Fichman qualifyed for the delayed Tokyo Olympics, partnering with Gabriela Dabrowski, and the WTA Finals, alongside Olmos.

=== 2022–24: Best doubles ranking, extended hiatus ===
Fichman reached a career-high ranking in doubles of No. 21 on 17 January 2022.

She did not play in the 2022, the 2023 and the 2024 WTA Tour, after sustaining an injury in 2021. She joined Sportsnet and its team of tennis commentators.

== Style of play ==
Fichman is an aggressive counter-puncher and is known for her tenacity as well as her feistiness on the court. She was known for her speed and ability to retrieve many balls while on defence.

== Significant finals ==
=== WTA 1000 tournaments ===
==== Doubles: 1 (title) ====
Result	Year	Tournament	Surface	Partner	Opponents	Score
Win	2021	Italian Open	Clay	(Mexico) Giuliana Olmos	(France) Kristina Mladenovic (Czech Republic) Markéta Vondroušová	4–6, 7–5, [10–5]

== WTA Tour finals ==
=== Doubles: 8 (4 titles, 4 runner-ups) ===
Legend WTA 1000 (1–0) WTA 500 (0–0) WTA 250 (3–4)	Finals by surface Hard (2–1) Clay (2–3)

Result	W–L	Date	Tournament	Tier	Surface	Partner	Opponents	Score
Loss	0–1	May 2009	Estoril Open, Portugal	International*	Clay	(Hungary) Katalin Marosi	(United States) Raquel Kops-Jones (United States) Abigail Spears	6–2, 3–6, [5–10]
Loss	0–2	Feb 2011	Copa Colsanitas, Colombia	International	Clay	(Spain) Laura Pous Tió	(Romania) Edina Gallovits-Hall (Spain) Anabel Medina Garrigues	6–2, 6–7^{(6–8)}, [9–11]
Win	1–2	Jan 2014	Auckland Open, New Zealand	International	Hard	(United States) Maria Sanchez	(Czech Republic) Lucie Hradecká (Netherlands) Michaëlla Krajicek	2–6, 6–0, [10–4]
Loss	1–3	May 2019	Nuremberg Cup, Germany	International	Clay	(United States) Nicole Melichar	(Canada) Gabriela Dabrowski (China) Xu Yifan	6–4, 6–7^{(5–7)}, [5–10]
Win	2–3	Jul 2019	Baltic Open, Latvia	International	Clay	(Serbia) Nina Stojanović	(Latvia) Jeļena Ostapenko (Kazakhstan) Galina Voskoboeva	2–6, 7–6^{(7–1)}, [10–6]
Loss	2–4	Feb 2020	Abierto Mexicano, Mexico	International	Hard	(Ukraine) Kateryna Bondarenko	(United States) Desirae Krawczyk (Mexico) Giuliana Olmos	3–6, 6–7^{(5–7)}
Win	3–4	Mar 2020	Monterrey Open, Mexico	International	Hard	(Ukraine) Kateryna Bondarenko	(Japan) Miyu Kato (China) Wang Yafan	4–6, 6–3, [10–7]
Win	4–4	May 2021	Italian Open, Italy	WTA 1000	Clay	(Mexico) Giuliana Olmos	(France) Kristina Mladenovic (Czech Republic) Markéta Vondroušová	4–6, 7–5, [10–5]

- The WTA International tournaments were reclassified as WTA 250 tournaments in 2021.

== WTA Challenger finals ==
=== Doubles: 1 (runner-up) ===
Result	Date	Tournament	Surface	Partner	Opponents	Score
Loss	Nov 2019	Houston Challenger, United States	Hard	(Japan) Ena Shibahara	(Australia) Ellen Perez (Brazil) Luisa Stefani	6–1, 4–6, [5–10]

== ITF Circuit finals ==
=== Singles: 22 (9 titles, 13 runner-ups) ===
Legend
$100,000 tournaments (1–2)
$50,000 tournaments (2–1)
$25,000 tournaments (5–8)
$10,000 tournaments (1–2)

Result	W–L	Date	Tournament	Tier	Surface	Opponent	Score
Win	1–0	Nov 2005	ITF Ashkelon, Israel	10,000	Hard	(Turkey) Pemra Özgen	6–1, 6–1
Loss	1–1	Dec 2005	ITF Ramat HaSharon, Israel	10,000	Hard	(Georgia (country)) Margalita Chakhnashvili	3–6, 6–7^{(4)}
Loss	1–2	Jul 2007	ITF Hamilton, Canada	25,000	Clay	(Canada) Stéphanie Dubois	2–6, 2–6
Loss	1–3	Jul 2007	ITF Calgary, Canada	10,000	Hard	(Serbia) Ana Veselinović	2–6, 1–6
Loss	1–4	Jul 2008	Waterloo Challenger, Canada	25,000	Clay	(United States) Alexandra Mueller	3–6, 3–6
Loss	1–5	Jan 2009	ITF Boca Raton, United States	25,000	Clay	(Venezuela) Gabriela Paz	4–6, 6–7^{(4)}
Win	2–5	Jan 2009	ITF Lutz, United States	25,000	Clay	(United States) Lauren Albanese	6–4, 7–6^{(5)}
Win	3–5	Apr 2009	Osprey Challenger, US	25,000	Clay	(Ukraine) Yuliana Fedak	4–6, 1–6
Loss	3–6	Sep 2009	Internazionali di Biella, Italy	100,000	Clay	(Croatia) Petra Martić	5–7, 4–6
Win	4–6	Jan 201	ITF Plantation, US	25,000	Clay	(Romania) Alexandra Cadanțu	6–3, 7–6^{(2)}
Win	5–6	Jul 2011	Waterloo Challenger, Canada	50,000	Clay	(United States) Julia Boserup	6–3, 4–6, 6–4
Win	6–6	Jul 2012	Waterloo Challenger, Canada	50,000	Clay	(Israel) Julia Glushko	6–3, 6–2
Win	7–6	Sep 2012	ITF Mamaia, Romania	25,000	Clay	(Romania) Patricia Maria Țig	6–3, 6–7^{(5)}, 6–3
Loss	7–7	Sep 2012	ITF Sofia, Bulgaria	25,000	Clay	(Romania) Cristina Mitu	4–6, 6–3, 3–6
Loss	7–8	Oct 2012	Tennis Classic of Troy, US	25,000	Hard	(Canada) Stéphanie Dubois	6–3, 4–6, 3–6
Loss	7–9	Oct 2012	ITF Rock Hill, US	25,000	Hard	(Canada) Rebecca Marino	6–3, 6–7^{(5)}, 2–6
Loss	7–10	Nov 2012	Toronto Challenger, Canada	50,000	Hard (i)	(Canada) Eugenie Bouchard	1–6, 2–6
Win	8–10	Jan 2013	ITF Port St. Lucie, US	25,000	Clay	(Slovenia) Tadeja Majerič	6–3, 6–2
Loss	8–11	May 2013	Wiesbaden Open, Germany	25,000	Clay	(Austria) Yvonne Meusburger	7–5, 4–6, 1–6
Loss	8–12	Aug 2013	Vancouver Open, Canada	100,000	Hard	(United Kingdom) Johanna Konta	4–6, 2–6
Win	9–12	May 2014	Open de Cagnes-sur-Mer, France	100,000	Clay	(Switzerland) Timea Bacsinszky	6–2, 6–2
Loss	9–13	Aug 2015	Winnipeg Challenger, Canada	25,000	Hard	(United States) Kristie Ahn	2–6, 5–7

=== Doubles: 40 (21 titles, 19 runner-ups) ===
Legend
$100,000 tournaments (3–1)
$75/80,000 tournaments (0–2)
$50/60,000 tournaments (8–9)
$25,000 tournaments (10–7)

Result	W–L	Date	Tournament	Tier	Surface	Partner	Opponents	Score
Win	1–0	Nov 2007	Toronto Challenger, Canada	25,000	Hard (i)	(Canada) Gabriela Dabrowski	(Brazil) Maria Fernanda Alves (Australia) Christina Wheeler	6–3, 6–0
Loss	1–1	Oct 2008	Challenger de Saguenay, Canada	50,000	Hard (i)	(Canada) Gabriela Dabrowski	(Hungary) Katalin Marosi (Brazil) Marina Tavares	6–2, 4–6, [4–10]
Loss	1–2	Jan 2009	ITF Boca Raton, US	25,000	Clay	(United States) Kimberly Couts	(Russia) Alina Jidkova (Belarus) Darya Kustova	4–6, 2–6
Win	2–2	Jan 2009	ITF Lutz, US	25,000	Clay	(United States) Kimberly Couts	(United States) Story Tweedie-Yates (United States) Mashona Washington	6–4, 7–5
Win	3–2	Nov 2009	ITF Rock Hill, US	25,000	Hard	(Georgia (country)) Anna Tatishvili	(United States) Lauren Albanese (United States) Jamie Hampton	7–6^{(5)}, 4–6, [10–3]
Win	4–2	Nov 2009	Phoenix Tennis Classic, US	50,000	Hard	(United States) Mashona Washington	(Canada) Marie-Ève Pelletier (Georgia (country)) Anna Tatishvili	4–6, 6–4, [10–8]
Loss	4–3	Nov 2009	Toronto Challenger, Canada	50,000	Hard (i)	(United States) Mashona Washington	(Canada) Maureen Drake (Canada) Marianne Jodoin	3–2 ret.
Win	5–3	Jul 2010	Open de Biarritz, France	100,000	Clay	(Germany) Julia Görges	(Spain) Lourdes Domínguez Lino (Romania) Monica Niculescu	7–5, 6–4
Loss	5–4	Jul 2010	Contrexéville Open, France	50,000	Clay	(Australia) Jelena Dokić	(Russia) Nina Bratchikova (Russia) Ekaterina Ivanova	6–4, 4–6, [3–10]
Win	6–4	Jul 2010	Pétange Open, Luxembourg	100,000	Clay	(Romania) Monica Niculescu	(France) Sophie Lefèvre (France) Laura Thorpe	6–4, 6–2
Win	7–4	Nov 2010	Toronto Challenger, Canada	50,000	Hard (i)	(Canada) Gabriela Dabrowski	(United States) Brittany Augustine (United States) Alexandra Mueller	6–4, 6–0
Loss	7–5	Jan 2011	ITF Lutz, US	25,000	Clay	(Canada) Gabriela Dabrowski	(United States) Ahsha Rolle (United States) Mashona Washington	4–6, 4–6
Win	8–5	Apr 2011	ITF Jackson, US	25,000	Clay	(Canada) Marie-Ève Pelletier	(Czech Republic) Eva Hrdinová (France) Natalie Piquion	7–6^{(1)}, 7–6^{(3)}
Win	9–5	May 2011	Charlottesville Open, US	50,000	Clay	(Canada) Marie-Ève Pelletier	(United States) Julie Ditty (United States) Carly Gullickson	6–3, 6–3
Win	10–5	May 2011	ITF Raleigh, US	50,000	Clay	(Canada) Marie-Ève Pelletier	(United States) Beatrice Capra (United States) Asia Muhammad	6–1, 6–3
Loss	10–6	Jun 2011	ITF Boston, US	50,000	Hard	(Canada) Marie-Ève Pelletier	(Ukraine) Tetiana Luzhanska (United States) Alexandra Mueller	6–7^{(3)}, 3–6
Win	11–6	Jul 2011	Challenger de Granby, Canada	25,000	Hard	(China) Sun Shengnan	(Belarus) Viktoryia Kisialeva (Brazil) Nathália Rossi	6–4, 6–2
Loss	11–7	Apr 2012	Dothan Pro Classic, US	50,000	Clay	(Canada) Marie-Ève Pelletier	(Canada) Eugenie Bouchard (United States) Jessica Pegula	4–6, 6–4, [5–10]
Win	12–7	Jul 2012	Waterloo Challenger, Canada	50,000	Clay	(Canada) Marie-Ève Pelletier	(Japan) Shuko Aoyama (Canada) Gabriela Dabrowski	6–2, 7–5
Win	13–7	Jul 2012	Challenger de Granby, Canada	25,000	Hard	(Canada) Marie-Ève Pelletier	(Japan) Shuko Aoyama (Japan) Miki Miyamura	4–6, 7–5, [10–4]
Loss	13–8	Oct 2012	Tennis Classic of Troy, US	25,000	Hard	(Canada) Marie-Ève Pelletier	(Russia) Angelina Gabueva (Russia) Arina Rodionova	4–6, 4–6
Loss	13–9	Oct 2012	Saguenay Challenger, Canada	50,000	Hard (i)	(Canada) Marie-Ève Pelletier	(Canada) Gabriela Dabrowski (Russia) Alla Kudryavtseva	2–6, 2–6
Win	14–9	May 2013	Wiesbaden Open, Germany	25,000	Clay	(Canada) Gabriela Dabrowski	(Germany) Dinah Pfizenmaier (Germany) Anna Zaja	6–3, 6–3
Loss	14–10	Jun 2013	Nottingham Trophy, UK	75,000	Grass	(Canada) Gabriela Dabrowski	(United States) Maria Sanchez (United Kingdom) Nicola Slater	6–4, 3–6, [8–10]
Win	15–10	Jul 2013	Waterloo Challenger, Canada	50,000	Clay	(Canada) Gabriela Dabrowski	(Japan) Misa Eguchi (Japan) Eri Hozumi	7–6^{(6)}, 6–3
Win	16–10	Aug 2013	Vancouver Open, Canada	100,000	Hard	(Ukraine) Maryna Zanevska	(United States) Jacqueline Cako (United States) Natalie Pluskota	6–2, 6–2
Loss	16–11	Feb 2014	Midland Tennis Classic, US	100,000	Hard (i)	(United States) Maria Sanchez	(Georgia (country)) Anna Tatishvili (United Kingdom) Heather Watson	5–7, 7–5, [6–10]
Loss	16–12	May 2014	Open Saint-Gaudens, France	50,000	Clay	(United Kingdom) Johanna Konta	(Paraguay) Verónica Cepede Royg (Argentina) María Irigoyen	5–7, 3–6
Loss	16–13	Jun 2014	Nottingham Trophy, UK	75,000	Grass	(United States) Maria Sanchez	(United Kingdom) Jocelyn Rae (United Kingdom) Anna Smith	6–7^{(5)}, 6–4, [5–10]
Win	17–13	Oct 2014	ITF Rock Hill, US	25,000	Hard	(Netherlands) Cindy Burger	(Greece) Despina Papamichail (Austria) Janina Toljan	4–6, 6–1, [10–6]
Loss	17–14	May 2015	Grado Tennis Cup, Italy	25,000	Clay	(Poland) Katarzyna Piter	(Switzerland) Viktorija Golubic (Brazil) Beatriz Haddad Maia	3–6, 2–6
Win	18–14	Aug 2015	Winnipeg Challenger, Canada	25,000	Hard	(Serbia) Jovana Jakšić	(United States) Kristie Ahn (United States) Lorraine Guillermo	6–2, 6–1
Loss	18–15	Oct 2015	Challenger de Saguenay, Canada	50,000	Hard (i)	(United States) Maria Sanchez	(Romania) Mihaela Buzărnescu (Poland) Justyna Jegiołka	6–7^{(6)}, 6–4, [7–10]
Win	19–15	Oct 2015	Toronto Challenger, Canada	50,000	Hard (i)	(United States) Maria Sanchez	(United States) Kristie Ahn (Hungary) Fanny Stollár	6–2, 6–7^{(6)}, [10–6]
Loss	19–16	Jan 2016	ITF Daytona Beach, US	25,000	Clay	(Canada) Carol Zhao	(Russia) Natela Dzalamidze (Russia) Veronika Kudermetova	4–6, 3–6
Win	20–16	Apr 2016	ITF Jackson, US	25,000	Clay	(Australia) Jarmila Wolfe	(United States) Yuki Kristina Chiang (United States) Lauren Herring	6–2, 6–3
Loss	20–17	Oct 2018	Challenger de Saguenay, Canada	60,000	Hard (i)	(United States) Maria Sanchez	(United Kingdom) Tara Moore (Switzerland) Conny Perrin	0–6, 7–5, [7–10]
Win	21–17	Oct 2018	Toronto Challenger, Canada	60,000	Hard (i)	(United States) Maria Sanchez	(Poland) Maja Chwalińska (Bulgaria) Elitsa Kostova	6–0, 6–4
Loss	21–18	Dec 2018	Pune Championships, India	25,000	Hard	(Russia) Valeria Savinykh	(Indonesia) Beatrice Gumulya (Montenegro) Ana Veselinović	6–7^{(4)}, 6–1, [9–11]
Loss	21–19	Apr 2019	Chiasso Open, Switzerland	25,000	Clay	(Australia) Jaimee Fourlis	(Spain) Cristina Bucșa (Ukraine) Marta Kostyuk	1–6, 6–3, [7–10]

== Junior Grand Slam tournament finals ==
=== Doubles: 3 (2 titles, 1 runner-up) ===
Result	Year	Championship	Surface	Partner	Opponents	Score
Win	2006	Australian Open	Hard	(Russia) Anastasia Pavlyuchenkova	(France) Alizé Cornet (Italy) Corinna Dentoni	6–2, 6–2
Win	2006	French Open	Clay	(Russia) Anastasia Pavlyuchenkova	(Poland) Agnieszka Radwańska (Denmark) Caroline Wozniacki	6–7^{(4)}, 6–2, 6–1
Loss	2006	US Open	Hard	(Russia) Anastasia Pavlyuchenkova	(Romania) Mihaela Buzărnescu (Romania) Raluca Olaru	5–7, 2–6

== Grand Slam performance timelines ==
Key
W	F	SF	QF	#R	RR	Q#	P#	DNQ	A	Z#	PO	G	S	B	NMS	NTI	P	NH

(W) winner; (F) finalist; (SF) semifinalist; (QF) quarterfinalist; (#R) rounds 4, 3, 2, 1; (RR) round-robin stage; (Q#) qualification round; (P#) preliminary round; (DNQ) did not qualify; (A) absent; (Z#) Davis/Fed Cup Zonal Group (with number indication) or (PO) play-off; (G) gold, (S) silver or (B) bronze Olympic/Paralympic medal; (NMS) not a Masters tournament; (NTI) not a Tier I tournament; (P) postponed; (NH) not held; (SR) strike rate (events won / competed); (W–L) win–loss record.
To avoid confusion and double counting, these charts are updated at the conclusion of a tournament or when the player's participation has ended.

=== Singles ===
Tournament	2009	2010	2011	2012	2013	2014	2015	SR	W–L
Australian Open	A	Q2	A	A	Q1	Q1	Q1	0 / 0	0–0
French Open	A	A	A	Q1	Q2	1R	A	0 / 1	0–1
Wimbledon	Q1	A	A	Q1	Q1	1R	A	0 / 1	0–1
US Open	Q2	Q3	Q2	Q2	1R	1R	A	0 / 2	0–2
Win–loss	0–0	0–0	0–0	0–0	0–1	0–3	0–0	0 / 4	0–4

=== Doubles ===
Tournament	2010	2011	2012	2013	2014	2015	2016	2017	2018	2019	2020	2021	SR	W–L	Win %
Australian Open	1R	A	A	A	1R	A	A	A	A	A	1R	QF	0 / 4	3–4	43%
French Open	A	A	A	A	2R	A	A	A	A	A	1R	3R	0 / 3	3–2	60%
Wimbledon	A	A	Q2	Q1	1R	A	A	A	A	A	NH	3R	0 / 2	1–1	50%
US Open	A	A	A	2R	1R	A	A	A	A	1R	1R	A	0 / 4	1–4	20%
Win–loss	0–1	0–0	0–0	1–1	1–3	0–0	0–0	0–0	0–0	0–1	0–3	6–2	0 / 14	8–11	42%

== Head-to-head record ==
=== Record against top-50 players ===
Fichman's win–loss record (4–7, 36%) against players who were ranked world No. 50 or higher when played is as follows:
Players who have been ranked world No. 1 are in boldface.

- (Romania) Sorana Cîrstea 2–1
- (Poland) Urszula Radwańska 1–0
- (Austria) Yvonne Meusburger 1–0 (Note: has a 1–2 overall record vs. Meusburger)
- (Poland) Agnieszka Radwańska 0–1
- (Russia) Maria Kirilenko 0–1
- (United States) Bethanie Mattek-Sands 0–1 (Note: Has a 0–2 overall record vs. Mattek-Sands)
- (Netherlands) Kiki Bertens 0–1 (Note: has a 1–2 overall record vs. Bertens)
- **(Serbia) Jelena Janković** 0–2

* statistics as of March 2016

== See also ==
- List of select Jewish tennis players
