= 2011 Odlum Brown Vancouver Open – Women's singles =

Women's singles
- 2011 Odlum Brown Vancouver Open

Final
- Champion: (Canada) Aleksandra Wozniak
- Runner-up: (United States) Jamie Hampton
- Score: 6–3, 6–1

Events
Singles	men	women
Doubles	men	women
← 2010 ·	Vancouver Open	· 2012 →

Jelena Dokić was the defending champion but decided not to participate.
Aleksandra Wozniak won the title, defeating Jamie Hampton 6–3, 6–1 in the final.

== Seeds ==
1. (Romania) Monica Niculescu (second round, withdrew due to an abdominal injury)
2. (United Kingdom) Anne Keothavong (second round)
3. (United States) Irina Falconi (semifinals)
4. (Greece) Eleni Daniilidou (semifinals)
5. (Japan) Misaki Doi (first round)
6. (United States) Alison Riske (first round)
7. (Canada) Stéphanie Dubois (second round, retired)
8. (Poland) Urszula Radwańska (quarterfinals)

== Draw ==
=== Key ===
- Q = Qualifier
- WC = Wild card
- LL = Lucky loser
- Alt = Alternate
- SE = Special exempt
- PR = Protected ranking
- ITF = ITF entry
- JE = Junior exempt
- w/o = Walkover
- r = Retired
- d = Defaulted
- SR = Special ranking

=== Finals ===
Semifinals
(United States) Jamie Hampton	6	7
4	(Greece) Eleni Daniilidou	2	5
3	(United States) Irina Falconi	4	4
(Canada) Aleksandra Wozniak	6	6

Final
(United States) Jamie Hampton	3	1
(Canada) Aleksandra Wozniak	6	6

=== Top half ===
First round
1	(Romania) M Niculescu	6	6
(Australia) S Peers	3	2
(Thailand) N Lertcheewakarn	2	4
(United States) J Hampton	6	6
Q	(Israel) J Glushko	6	6
(Canada) S Fichman	3	4
Q	(Australia) O Rogowska	3	6	6
5	(Japan) M Doi	6	4	1
4	(Greece) E Daniilidou	6	6
(Luxembourg) A Kremer	3	1
(Czech Republic) Kr Plíšková	6^{4}	1
WC	(United States) A Fink	7^{7}	6
(United States) J Cohen	7	6
WC	(Canada) E Bouchard	5	4
(Kazakhstan) Y Shvedova	4	0
7	(Canada) S Dubois	6	6

Second round
1	(Romania) M Niculescu
(United States) J Hampton	w/o
Q	(Israel) J Glushko	6	6
Q	(Australia) O Rogowska	4	2
4	(Greece) E Daniilidou	6^{7}	6	6
WC	(United States) A Fink	7	1	4
(United States) J Cohen	6	4
7	(Canada) S Dubois	2	1^{r}

Quarterfinals
(United States) J Hampton	6	6
Q	(Israel) J Glushko	4	4
4	(Greece) E Daniilidou	6	6
(United States) J Cohen	2	4

Semifinals
(United States) J Hampton	6	7
4	(Greece) E Daniilidou	2	5

=== Bottom half ===
First round
6	(United States) A Riske	6	3	5
(Croatia) A Tomljanović	4	6	7
(Canada) H El Tabakh	5	2
Q	(Australia) C Dellacqua	7	6
SR	(Australia) M Adamczak	4	1
WC	(Canada) G Dabrowski	6	6
(Germany) K Wörle	1	7	1
3	(United States) I Falconi	6	5	6
8	(Poland) U Radwańska	6	6
Q	(United States) M Brengle	3	3
WC	(United States) G Brodsky	6	4	5
(Russia) A Rodionova	3	6	7
(Canada) A Wozniak	6	4	6
(United Kingdom) L Robson	4	6	1
(Hong Kong) L Zhang	4	1
2	(United Kingdom) A Keothavong	6	6

Second round
(Croatia) A Tomljanović	4	6	6
Q	(Australia) C Dellacqua	6	4	2
WC	(Canada) G Dabrowski	1	0
3	(United States) I Falconi	6	6
8	(Poland) U Radwańska	6	6
(Russia) A Rodionova	1	1
(Canada) A Wozniak	6	6
2	(United Kingdom) A Keothavong	2	0

Quarterfinals
(Croatia) A Tomljanović	4	1
3	(United States) I Falconi	6	6
8	(Poland) U Radwańska	7	3	3
(Canada) A Wozniak	5	6	6

Semifinals
3	(United States) I Falconi	4	4
(Canada) A Wozniak	6	6
