= 2011 Fifth Third Bank Tennis Championships – Women's singles =

Women's singles
- 2011 Fifth Third Bank Tennis Championships

Final
- Champion: (United States) Chichi Scholl
- Runner-up: (United States) Amanda Fink
- Score: 6–1, 6–1

Events
Singles	men	women
Doubles	men	women
← 2010 ·	Fifth Third Bank Tennis Championships	· 2012 →

Kurumi Nara was the defending champion, but chose not to participate.
Chichi Scholl won the final against Amanda Fink 6–1, 6–1.

== Seeds ==
1. (United States) Melanie Oudin (first round)
2. (United States) Alison Riske (quarterfinals)
3. (United States) Sloane Stephens (first round)
4. (Ukraine) Tetiana Luzhanska (quarterfinals)
5. (United States) Julia Cohen (first round)
6. (Hungary) Melinda Czink (first round)
7. (Canada) Heidi El Tabakh (second round)
8. (Hong Kong) Zhang Ling (semifinals)

== Main draw ==
=== Key ===
- Q = Qualifier
- WC = Wild card
- LL = Lucky loser
- Alt = Alternate
- SE = Special exempt
- PR = Protected ranking
- ITF = ITF entry
- JE = Junior exempt
- w/o = Walkover
- r = Retired
- d = Defaulted
- SR = Special ranking

=== Finals ===
Semifinals
Q	(United States) Amanda Fink	6	6
8	(Hong Kong) Zhang Ling	1	4
(United States) Chichi Scholl	6	7^{7}
(United States) Lauren Davis	2	6^{3}

Final
Q	(United States) Amanda Fink	1	1
(United States) Chichi Scholl	6	6

=== Top half ===
First round
1/WC	(United States) M Oudin	6^{4}	6	3
(South Africa) C Simmonds	7^{7}	2	6
Q	(United States) L Embree	6	6
(Australia) T Patterson	3	2
Q	(United States) A Fink	6	7
(United States) J Boserup	0	5
(Belgium) T Hendler	6	4	6^{3}
7	(Canada) H El Tabakh	4	6	7^{7}
3	(United States) S Stephens	2	6^{6}
(United States) J Elie	6	7^{8}
(Japan) A Nakamura	6	6
(Bolivia) MF Álvarez Terán	3	1
(United States) A Rolle	6	2	6
Q	(United States) H Barte	4	6	4
(Puerto Rico) M Puig	7	4	4
8	(Hong Kong) L Zhang	5	6	6

Second round
(South Africa) C Simmonds	6^{3}	6	6
Q	(United States) L Embree	7^{7}	0	2
Q	(United States) A Fink	7	6
7	(Canada) H El Tabakh	5	2
(United States) J Elie	1	6	2
(Japan) A Nakamura	6	2	6
(United States) A Rolle	4	6^{3}
8	(Hong Kong) L Zhang	6	7^{7}

Quarterfinals
(South Africa) C Simmonds	3	5
Q	(United States) A Fink	6	7
(Japan) A Nakamura	4	4
8	(Hong Kong) L Zhang	6	6

Semifinals
Q	(United States) A Fink	6	6
8	(Hong Kong) L Zhang	1	4

=== Bottom half ===
First round
6	(Hungary) M Czink	4	6	4
(United States) C Scholl	6	2	6
(Chinese Taipei) W-h Hsu	1	3
(United States) A Weinhold	6	6
WC	(United States) R Anderson	4	4
(United States) A Mueller	6	6
(United States) M Falcon	4	4
4	(Ukraine) T Luzhanska	6	6
5	(United States) J Cohen	4	2
Q	(United States) G Min	6	6
(United States) L Davis	4	6	6
WC	(United States) N Gibbs	6	3	2
(United States) M Keys	6	7
(United States) L Lee-Waters	1	5
(United States) K Hardebeck	4	6	1
2	(United States) A Riske	6	4	6

Second round
(United States) C Scholl	6	7^{7}
(United States) A Weinhold	1	6^{5}
(United States) A Mueller	5	0
4	(Ukraine) T Luzhanska	7	6
Q	(United States) G Min	6	3	2
(United States) L Davis	1	6	6
(United States) M Keys	3	7^{7}	3
2	(United States) A Riske	6	6^{3}	6

Quarterfinals
(United States) C Scholl	6	6
4	(Ukraine) T Luzhanska	1	3
(United States) L Davis	7	6
2	(United States) A Riske	5	0

Semifinals
(United States) C Scholl	6	7^{7}
(United States) L Davis	2	6^{3}
