= 2011 Odlum Brown Vancouver Open – Women's doubles =

Women's doubles
- 2011 Odlum Brown Vancouver Open

Final
- Champions: (Czech Republic) Karolína Plíšková (Czech Republic) Kristýna Plíšková
- Runners-up: (United States) Jamie Hampton (Thailand) Noppawan Lertcheewakarn
- Score: 5–7, 6–2, [10–2]

Events
Singles	men	women
Doubles	men	women
← 2010 ·	Vancouver Open	· 2012 →

Chang Kai-chen and Heidi El Tabakh were the defending champions but decided not to participate.
Karolína Plíšková and Kristýna Plíšková won the title, defeating Jamie Hampton and Noppawan Lertcheewakarn 5–7, 6–2, [10–2] in the final.

== Seeds ==
1. (Russia) Arina Rodionova / (Kazakhstan) Yaroslava Shvedova (quarterfinals)
2. (Russia) Maria Kondratieva / (France) Sophie Lefevre (first round)
3. (Romania) Monica Niculescu / (Poland) Urszula Radwańska (quarterfinals, withdrew due to Niculescu's abdominal injury)
4. (United Kingdom) Anne Keothavong / (Germany) Kathrin Wörle (quarterfinals)

== Draw ==
=== Key ===
- Q = Qualifier
- WC = Wild card
- LL = Lucky loser
- Alt = Alternate
- SE = Special exempt
- PR = Protected ranking
- ITF = ITF entry
- JE = Junior exempt
- w/o = Walkover
- r = Retired
- d = Defaulted
- SR = Special ranking

=== Draw ===
First round
1	(Russia) A Rodionova (Kazakhstan) Y Shvedova	7^{11}	2	[10]
(United States) L Lee-Waters (United States) M Moulton-Levy	6^{9}	6	[8]
(Australia) C Dellacqua (Australia) O Rogowska	6	6
(United States) M Brengle (United States) J Cohen	4	0
4	(United Kingdom) A Keothavong (Germany) K Wörle	4	6	[10]
WC	(Canada) E Bouchard (Canada) S Dubois	6	4	[2]
Q	(Canada) G Dabrowski (United States) L Litvak	6	1	[7]
Q	(Czech Republic) Ka Plíšková (Czech Republic) Kr Plíšková	2	6	[10]
(United States) J Hampton (Thailand) N Lertcheewakarn	7^{7}	6
SR	(Australia) M Adamczak (Japan) K Iijima	6^{3}	3
(United States) C Fusano (United States) Y Schnack	4	1
3	(Romania) M Niculescu (Poland) U Radwańska	6	6
WC	(United States) A Muhammed (United States) M Sanchez	6	6
WC	(United States) A Fink (United States) C Scholl	1	1
(Luxembourg) A Kremer (Australia) S Peers	6	6
2	(Russia) M Kondratieva (France) S Lefevre	3	2

Quarterfinals
1	(Russia) A Rodionova (Kazakhstan) Y Shvedova	3	4
(Australia) C Dellacqua (Australia) O Rogowska	6	6
4	(United Kingdom) A Keothavong (Germany) K Wörle	2	3
Q	(Czech Republic) Ka Plíšková (Czech Republic) Kr Plíšková	6	6
(United States) J Hampton (Thailand) N Lertcheewakarn	w/o
3	(Romania) M Niculescu (Poland) U Radwańska
WC	(United States) A Muhammed (United States) M Sanchez	7	6
(Luxembourg) A Kremer (Australia) S Peers	5	4

Semifinals
(Australia) C Dellacqua (Australia) O Rogowska	4	6	[8]
Q	(Czech Republic) Ka Plíšková (Czech Republic) Kr Plíšková	6	4	[10]
(United States) J Hampton (Thailand) N Lertcheewakarn	3	6	[10]
WC	(United States) A Muhammed (United States) M Sanchez	6	3	[7]

Final
Q	(Czech Republic) Ka Plíšková (Czech Republic) Kr Plíšková	5	6	[10]
(United States) J Hampton (Thailand) N Lertcheewakarn	7	2	[2]
