= 2011 Fifth Third Bank Tennis Championships =

- Date: 18–24 July
- Edition: 17th (men); 12th (women)
- Location: Lexington, Kentucky, United States

Champions

Men's singles
- (United States) Wayne Odesnik

Women's singles
- (United States) Chichi Scholl

Men's doubles
- (Australia) Jordan Kerr / (United States) David Martin

Women's doubles
- (Belgium) Tamaryn Hendler / (United States) Chichi Scholl
- Fifth Third Bank Tennis Championships

The 2011 Fifth Third Bank Tennis Championships was a professional tennis tournament played on hard courts. It was the 17th edition of the tournament which was part of the 2011 ATP Challenger Tour and the 12th edition for the 2011 ITF Women's Circuit. It took place in Lexington, Kentucky, United States between 18 and 24 July 2011.

== ATP singles main-draw entrants ==
=== Seeds ===
Country	Player	Rank^{1}	Seed
GBR	James Ward	202	1
USA	Wayne Odesnik	218	2
AUS	Chris Guccione	221	3
RSA	Fritz Wolmarans	222	4
AUS	Carsten Ball	230	5
USA	Michael Yani	234	6
SRB	Ilija Bozoljac	239	7
BIH	Amer Delić	246	8

- ^{1} Rankings are as of July 11, 2011.

=== Other entrants ===
The following players received wildcards into the singles main draw:

- (France) Alexis Musialek
- (United States) Eric Quigley
- (United States) Jack Sock
- (United States) Rhyne Williams

The following players received entry from the qualifying draw:

- (United States) Devin Britton
- (United States) Chase Buchanan
- (United States) Michael McClune
- (United States) Blake Strode

The following players received entry as a lucky loser into the singles main draw:

- (United States) Jordan Cox

== WTA singles main-draw entrants ==
=== Seeds ===
Country	Player	Rank^{1}	Seed
USA	Melanie Oudin	100	1
USA	Alison Riske	117	2
USA	Sloane Stephens	131	3
UKR	Tetiana Luzhanska	157	4
USA	Julia Cohen	165	5
HUN	Melinda Czink	167	6
CAN	Heidi El Tabakh	185	7
HKG	Zhang Ling	194	8

- ^{1} Rankings are as of July 11, 2011.

=== Other entrants ===
The following players received wildcards into the singles main draw:

- (United States) Robin Anderson
- (United States) Nicole Gibbs
- (United States) Melanie Oudin

The following players received entry from the qualifying draw:

- (United States) Hilary Barte
- (United States) Lauren Embree
- (United States) Amanda Fink
- (United States) Grace Min

== Champions ==
=== Men's singles ===
(United States) Wayne Odesnik def. (United Kingdom) James Ward, 7–5, 6–4

=== Women's singles ===
(United States) Chichi Scholl def. (United States) Amanda Fink, 6–1, 6–1

=== Men's doubles ===
(Australia) Jordan Kerr / (United States) David Martin def. (United Kingdom) James Ward / (United States) Michael Yani, 6–3, 6–4

=== Women's doubles ===
(Belgium) Tamaryn Hendler / (United States) Chichi Scholl def. (United States) Lindsay Lee-Waters / (United States) Megan Moulton-Levy, 7–6^{(11–9)}, 3–6, [10–7]
