= 2010 Odlum Brown Vancouver Open – Women's singles =

Women's singles
- 2010 Odlum Brown Vancouver Open

Final
- Champion: (Australia) Jelena Dokić
- Runner-up: (France) Virginie Razzano
- Score: 6–1, 6–4

Events
Singles	men	women
Doubles	men	women
← 2009 ·	Vancouver Open	· 2011 →

Stéphanie Dubois was the defending champion but she lost in the quarterfinals to Irina Falconi. Fourth seed Jelena Dokić from Australia defeated France's Virginie Razzano to claim the title.

== Seeds ==
1. (Chinese Taipei) Chan Yung-jan (second round)
2. (Chinese Taipei) Chang Kai-chen (first round)
3. (Australia) Alicia Molik (first round)
4. (Australia) Jelena Dokić (champion)
5. (Canada) Stéphanie Dubois (quarterfinals)
6. (France) Virginie Razzano (final)
7. (United States) Lilia Osterloh (quarterfinals)
8. (India) Sania Mirza (second round)

== Draw ==
=== Key ===
- Q = Qualifier
- WC = Wild card
- LL = Lucky loser
- Alt = Alternate
- SE = Special exempt
- PR = Protected ranking
- ITF = ITF entry
- JE = Junior exempt
- w/o = Walkover
- r = Retired
- d = Defaulted
- SR = Special ranking

=== Finals ===
Semifinals
6	(France) Virginie Razzano	7	6
(United States) Christina McHale	5	3
4	(Australia) Jelena Dokić	6^{4}	6	6
Q	(United States) Irina Falconi	7	2	3

Final
6	(France) Virginie Razzano	1	4
4	(Australia) Jelena Dokić	6	6

=== Top half ===
First round
1	(Chinese Taipei) Y-j Chan	6	6
WC	(United States) B Capra	3	4
(Georgia (country)) A Tatishvili	1	1
Q	(United States) G Brodsky	6	6
(United States) L Lee-Waters	0	3
PR	(Croatia) J Pandžić	6	6
SE	(Thailand) N Lertcheewakarn	1	2
6	(France) V Razzano	4
3	(Australia) A Molik	3	1
WC	(Canada) G Dabrowski	6	6
(United States) C McHale	6	6
(Canada) R Marino	1	4
(Canada) H El Tabakh	5	2
(United States) A Rolle	7	6
(Japan) M Doi	3	6	5
7	(United States) L Osterloh	6	2	7

Second round
1	(Chinese Taipei) Y-j Chan	4	6	2
Q	(United States) G Brodsky	6	2	6
PR	(Croatia) J Pandžić	4	5
6	(France) V Razzano	6	6
(Canada) G Dabrowski	1	4
(United States) C McHale	6	6
(United States) A Rolle	5	3
7	(United States) L Osterloh	7	6

Quarterfinals
(United States) G Brodsky	5	1
6	(France) V Razzano	7	6
(United States) C McHale	6	6
7	(United States) L Osterloh	4	4

Semifinals
6	(France) V Razzano	7	6
(United States) C McHale	5	3

=== Bottom half ===
First round
8	(India) S Mirza	6	6
WC	(Canada) E Bouchard	2	2
WC	(United States) S Rogers	3	6	6
(Canada) V Tétreault	6	4	0
(United States) K Couts	4	2
(United States) J Elie	6	6
(United States) C Gullickson	7	4	5
4	(Australia) J Dokić	6^{2}	6	7
5	(Canada) S Dubois	6	6
Q	(United States) H Barte	1	2
(Canada) S Fichman	3	3
Q	(United States) M Falcon	6	6
Q	(United States) I Falconi	6	6
(United States) M Washington	3	2
(United States) L Albanese	6	7
2	(Chinese Taipei) K-c Chang	0	6^{8}

Second round
8	(India) S Mirza	6	5	5
WC	(United States) S Rogers	2	7	7
(United States) J Elie	2	1
4	(Australia) J Dokić	6	6
5	(Canada) S Dubois	6	6
Q	(United States) M Falcon	1	1
Q	(United States) I Falconi	6	1	4
(United States) L Albanese	1	6	6

Quarterfinals
WC	(United States) S Rogers	3	6^{6}
4	(Australia) J Dokić	6	7
(Canada) S Dubois	7	1	2
Q	(United States) I Falconi	5	6	6

Semifinals
4	(Australia) J Dokić	6^{4}	6	6
Q	(United States) I Falconi	7	2	3
