= 2010 Odlum Brown Vancouver Open =

- Date: August 2 – August 8
- Edition: 6th (men); 9th (women)
- Category: ATP Challenger Tour; ITF Women's Circuit
- Prize money: US$100,000 (men); US$75,000 (women)
- Surface: Hard – outdoors
- Location: West Vancouver, British Columbia, Canada
- Venue: Hollyburn Country Club

Champions

Men's singles
- (Israel) Dudi Sela

Women's singles
- (Australia) Jelena Dokić

Men's doubles
- (Philippines) Treat Conrad Huey / (United Kingdom) Dominic Inglot

Women's doubles
- (Chinese Taipei) Chang Kai-chen / (Canada) Heidi El Tabakh
← 2009 ·	Vancouver Open	· 2011 →

The 2010 Odlum Brown Vancouver Open was a professional tennis tournament played on outdoor hard courts. It was the 6th edition, for men, and 9th edition, for women, of the tournament and part of the 2010 ATP Challenger Tour and the 2010 ITF Women's Circuit, offering totals of $100,000, for men, and $75,000, for women, in prize money. It took place in West Vancouver, British Columbia, Canada between August 2 and August 8, 2010.

== Men's singles main-draw entrants ==
=== Seeds ===
Country	Player	Rank^{1}	Seed
USA	Taylor Dent	84	1
GER	Tobias Kamke	102	2
ISR	Dudi Sela	104	3
LTU	Ričardas Berankis	131	4
SRB	Ilija Bozoljac	135	5
USA	Jesse Levine	152	6
USA	Robert Kendrick	155	7
USA	Jesse Witten	169	7

- ^{1} Rankings are as of July 26, 2010

=== Other entrants ===
The following players received wildcards into the singles main draw:

- (Canada) Philip Bester
- (United States) Andrea Collarini
- (United States) Ryan Harrison
- (Canada) Vasek Pospisil

The following players entered the singles main draw with a special exempt:

- (Canada) Frank Dancevic
- (Canada) Milos Raonic

The following players received entry from the qualifying draw:

- (Canada) Steven Diez
- (Australia) Brydan Klein
- (United States) Alex Kuznetsov
- (United Kingdom) James Ward

== Champions ==
=== Men's singles ===
(Israel) Dudi Sela def. (Lithuania) Ričardas Berankis, 7–5, 6–2

=== Women's singles ===
(Australia) Jelena Dokić def. (France) Virginie Razzano, 6–1, 6–4

=== Men's doubles ===
(Philippines) Treat Conrad Huey / (United Kingdom) Dominic Inglot def. (United States) Ryan Harrison / (United States) Jesse Levine, 6–4, 7–5

=== Women's doubles ===
(Chinese Taipei) Chang Kai-chen / (Canada) Heidi El Tabakh def. (United States) Irina Falconi / (United States) Amanda Fink, 3–6, 6–3, [10–4]
