= 2011 Fifth Third Bank Tennis Championships – Women's doubles =

Women's doubles
- 2011 Fifth Third Bank Tennis Championships

Final
- Champions: (Belgium) Tamaryn Hendler (United States) Chichi Scholl
- Runners-up: (United States) Lindsay Lee-Waters (United States) Megan Moulton-Levy
- Score: 7–6^{(11–9)}, 3–6, [10–7]

Events
Singles	men	women
Doubles	men	women
- Fifth Third Bank Tennis Championships

Bojana Bobusic and Christina Fusano were the defending champions, but both chose not to participate.
Tamaryn Hendler and Chichi Scholl defeated Lindsay Lee-Waters and Megan Moulton-Levy, 7–6^{(11–9)}, 3–6, [10–7].

== Seeds ==
1. (United States) Lindsay Lee-Waters / (United States) Megan Moulton-Levy (final)
2. (United States) Melanie Oudin / (United States) Alison Riske (first round)
3. (United States) Macall Harkins / (South Africa) Chanel Simmonds (semifinals)
4. (Chinese Taipei) Hsu Wen-hsin / (United States) Whitney Jones (semifinals)

== Draw ==
Key

- Q = Qualifier
- WC = Wild card
- LL = Lucky loser
- Alt = Alternate
- ITF = ITF entry
- PR = Protected ranking
- SR = Special ranking
- SE = Special exempt
- JE = Junior exempt
- JR = Junior Accelerator Programme entrant
- CO = College Accelerator Programme entrant
- NG = Next Gen Accelerator Program entrant
- w/o = Walkover
- r = Retired
- d = Defaulted

=== Draw ===
First round
1	(United States) L Lee-Waters (United States) M Moulton-Levy	6	6
(United States) M Broderick (United States) C McGraw	1	3
(United States) J Abaza (United States) A Assal	2	6^{3}
(United States) J Elie (India) S Uberoi	6	7^{7}
4	(Chinese Taipei) W-h Hsu (United States) W Jones	6	6
(France) S Benamar (Canada) H El Tabakh	1	4
(Bolivia) MF Álvarez Terán (United States) L Litvak	w/o
(United States) S Marand (United States) M Sanchez
(United States) N Robinson (Indonesia) R Tedjakusuma	4	6	[7]
(United States) J Cohen (United States) L Embree	6	4	[10]
(United States) R Anderson (United States) ZG Scandalis	4	6^{2}
3	(United States) M Harkins (South Africa) C Simmonds	6	7^{7}
(United States) M Falcon (United States) C-y Hsu	3	2
(Belgium) T Hendler (United States) C Scholl	6	6
(United States) H Barte (United States) A Will	6	7
2	(United States) M Oudin (United States) A Riske	3	5

Quarterfinals
1	(United States) L Lee-Waters (United States) M Moulton-Levy	7^{9}	1	[10]
(United States) J Elie (India) S Uberoi	6^{7}	6	[6]
4	(Chinese Taipei) W-h Hsu (United States) W Jones	6	6
(Bolivia) MF Álvarez Terán (United States) L Litvak	1	3
(United States) J Cohen (United States) L Embree	6	0	[5]
3	(United States) M Harkins (South Africa) C Simmonds	4	6	[10]
(Belgium) T Hendler (United States) C Scholl	6^{5}	7	[11]
(United States) H Barte (United States) A Will	7	5	[9]

Semifinals
1	(United States) L Lee-Waters (United States) M Moulton-Levy	6	6
4	(Chinese Taipei) W-h Hsu (United States) W Jones	4	2
3	(United States) M Harkins (South Africa) C Simmonds	3	1
(Belgium) T Hendler (United States) C Scholl	6	6

Finals
1	(United States) L Lee-Waters (United States) M Moulton-Levy	6^{9}	6	[7]
(Belgium) T Hendler (United States) C Scholl	7^{11}	3	[10]
