= 2010 Odlum Brown Vancouver Open – Women's doubles =

Women's doubles
- 2010 Odlum Brown Vancouver Open

Final
- Champions: (Chinese Taipei) Chang Kai-chen (Canada) Heidi El Tabakh
- Runners-up: (United States) Irina Falconi (United States) Amanda Fink
- Score: 3–6, 6–3, [10–4]

Events
Singles	men	women
Doubles	men	women
← 2009 ·	Vancouver Open	· 2011 →

Ahsha Rolle and Riza Zalameda were the defending champions, but Zalameda decided not to participate this year. Rolle partnered with Alexandra Mueller, but lost in the first round to Christina Fusano and Courtney Nagle.

Chang Kai-chen and Heidi El Tabakh won the title, defeating Irina Falconi and Amanda Fink 3–6, 6–3, [10–4] in the final.

== Seeds ==
1. (Canada) Sharon Fichman / (United States) Mashona Washington (first round)
2. (United States) Lilia Osterloh / (Georgia (country)) Anna Tatishvili (quarterfinals)
3. (United States) Lindsay Lee-Waters / (United States) Megan Moulton-Levy (first round)
4. (United States) Christina Fusano / (United States) Courtney Nagle (quarterfinals)

== Draw ==
=== Key ===
- Q = Qualifier
- WC = Wild card
- LL = Lucky loser
- Alt = Alternate
- SE = Special exempt
- PR = Protected ranking
- ITF = ITF entry
- JE = Junior exempt
- w/o = Walkover
- r = Retired
- d = Defaulted
- SR = Special ranking

First round
1	(Canada) S Fichman (United States) M Washington	0	1
(Canada) S Dubois (India) S Mirza	6	6
(Chinese Taipei) K-c Chang (Canada) H El Tabakh	3	6	[10]
(Canada) G Dabrowski (Latvia) L Dekmeijere	6	4	[6]
4	(United States) C Fusano (United States) C Nagle	6	6
(United States) A Mueller (United States) A Rolle	3	2
(Japan) M Doi (Canada) R Marino	5	4
Q	(United States) L Albanese (Thailand) N Lertcheewakarn	7	6
(United States) K Couts (United States) M Harkins	2	6	[12]
Q	(United States) I Falconi (United States) A Fink	6	4	[14]
(United States) A Muhammad (United States) A Weinhold	6^{5}	7	[10]
3	(United States) L Lee-Waters (United States) M Moulton-Levy	7^{7}	5	[8]
WC	(Canada) E Shulaeva (Canada) V Tétreault	6	4	[9]
WC	(Canada) É Abanda (Canada) E Bouchard	4	6	[11]
WC	(United States) N Gibbs (United States) S Rogers	1	0
2	(United States) L Osterloh (Georgia (country)) A Tatishvili	6	6

Quarterfinals
(Canada) S Dubois (India) S Mirza	6^{3}	6	[5]
(Chinese Taipei) K-c Chang (Canada) H El Tabakh	7^{7}	4	[10]
4	(United States) C Fusano (United States) C Nagle	2	6	[2]
Q	(United States) L Albanese (Thailand) N Lertcheewakarn	6	2	[10]
Q	(United States) I Falconi (United States) A Fink	6	6
(United States) A Muhammad (United States) A Weinhold	1	4
WC	(Canada) É Abanda (Canada) E Bouchard	6	7
2	(United States) L Osterloh (Georgia (country)) A Tatishvili	3	5

Semifinals
(Chinese Taipei) K-c Chang (Canada) H El Tabakh	6	6
Q	(United States) L Albanese (Thailand) N Lertcheewakarn	2	2
Q	(United States) I Falconi (United States) A Fink	6	6
WC	(Canada) É Abanda (Canada) E Bouchard	2	3

Final
(Chinese Taipei) K-c Chang (Canada) H El Tabakh	3	6	[10]
Q	(United States) I Falconi (United States) A Fink	6	3	[4]
