= 2011 Odlum Brown Vancouver Open – Men's doubles =

Men's doubles
- 2011 Odlum Brown Vancouver Open

Final
- Champions: (Philippines) Treat Conrad Huey (United States) Travis Parrott
- Runners-up: (Australia) Jordan Kerr (United States) David Martin
- Score: 6–2, 1–6, [16–14]

Events
Singles	men	women
Doubles	men	women
← 2010 ·	Vancouver Open	· 2012 →

Treat Conrad Huey and Dominic Inglot were the defending champions, but only Huey tries to defend his title. He played alongside Travis Parrott and they won the title, defeating Jordan Kerr and David Martin 6–2, 1–6, [16–14] in the final.

== Seeds ==
1. (Australia) Stephen Huss / (United Kingdom) Jamie Murray (first round)
2. (Philippines) Treat Conrad Huey / (United States) Travis Parrott (champion)
3. (Australia) Jordan Kerr / (United States) David Martin (final)
4. (Canada) Vasek Pospisil / (United States) Bobby Reynolds (semifinals, withdrew)

== Draw ==
=== Key ===
- Q = Qualifier
- WC = Wild card
- LL = Lucky loser
- Alt = Alternate
- SE = Special exempt
- PR = Protected ranking
- ITF = ITF entry
- JE = Junior exempt
- w/o = Walkover
- r = Retired
- d = Defaulted
- SR = Special ranking

=== Draw ===
First round
1	(Australia) S Huss (United Kingdom) J Murray	5	4
WC	(United States) B Klahn (United States) D Kosakowski	7	6
Q	(United States) B Battistone (United States) C Wettengel	4	2
(Australia) C Ball (United States) T Rettenmaier	6	6
3	(Australia) J Kerr (United States) D Martin	7	6
WC	(Switzerland) G Bastl (Canada) Daniel Chu	5	4
(France) Clément Reix (Serbia) D Vemić	4	3
(Japan) Y Sugita (Slovenia) G Žemlja	6	6
(Moldova) R Borvanov (New Zealand) M Venus
(Canada) É Chvojka (United States) Greg Ouellette	w/o
WC	(United States) Peter Aarts (Canada) Kamil Pajkowski	3	6	[4]
4	(Canada) V Pospisil (United States) B Reynolds	6	4	[10]
(Australia) Chris Letcher (United States) M Sykut	6	2	[7]
(United Kingdom) C Fleming (United Kingdom) J Ward	3	6	[10]
(Canada) P-L Duclos (Australia) G Jones	2	4
2	(Philippines) TC Huey (United States) T Parrott	6	6

Quarterfinals
WC	(United States) B Klahn (United States) D Kosakowski	6^{5}	1
(Australia) C Ball (United States) T Rettenmaier	7^{7}	6
3	(Australia) J Kerr (United States) D Martin	6	6
(Japan) Y Sugita (Slovenia) G Žemlja	1	2
(Canada) É Chvojka (United States) Greg Ouellette	3	2
4	(Canada) V Pospisil (United States) B Reynolds	6	6
(United Kingdom) C Fleming (United Kingdom) J Ward	4	4
2	(Philippines) TC Huey (United States) T Parrott	6	6

Semifinals
(Australia) C Ball (United States) T Rettenmaier	3	4
3	(Australia) J Kerr (United States) D Martin	6	6
4	(Canada) V Pospisil (United States) B Reynolds
2	(Philippines) TC Huey (United States) T Parrott	w/o

Final
3	(Australia) J Kerr (United States) D Martin	2	6	[14]
2	(Philippines) TC Huey (United States) T Parrott	6	1	[16]
