= 2011 Odlum Brown Vancouver Open =

- Date: August 1–7, 2011
- Edition: 7th (men); 10th (women)
- Category: ATP Challenger Tour; ITF Women's Circuit
- Prize money: US$100,000 (men); US$100,000 (women)
- Surface: Hard – outdoors
- Location: West Vancouver, British Columbia, Canada
- Venue: Hollyburn Country Club

Champions

Men's singles
- (United Kingdom) James Ward

Women's singles
- (Canada) Aleksandra Wozniak

Men's doubles
- (Philippines) Treat Conrad Huey / (United States) Travis Parrott

Women's doubles
- (Czech Republic) Karolína Plíšková / (Czech Republic) Kristýna Plíšková
← 2010 ·	Vancouver Open	· 2012 →

The 2011 Odlum Brown Vancouver Open was a professional tennis tournament played on outdoor hard courts. It was the 7th edition, for men, and 10th edition, for women, of the tournament and part of the 2011 ATP Challenger Tour and the 2011 ITF Women's Circuit, offering totals of $100,000, for men, and $100,000, for women, in prize money. It took place in West Vancouver, British Columbia, Canada between August 1 and August 7, 2011.

== Men's singles main-draw entrants ==
=== Seeds ===
Country	Player	Rank^{1}	Seed
TPE	Lu Yen-hsun	76	1
USA	Bobby Reynolds	123	2
SVN	Grega Žemlja	136	3
JPN	Yūichi Sugita	170	4
GBR	James Ward	177	5
CAN	Vasek Pospisil	187	6
RSA	Fritz Wolmarans	217	7
AUS	Greg Jones	222	8

- ^{1} Rankings are as of July 25, 2011

=== Other entrants ===
The following players received wildcards into the singles main draw:

- (United States) Steve Johnson
- (United States) Bradley Klahn
- (United States) Daniel Kosakowski
- (United States) David Martin

The following players received entry from the qualifying draw:

- (Slovenia) Luka Gregorc
- (Japan) Toshihide Matsui
- (United States) Michael McClune
- (United States) Travis Rettenmaier

== Women's singles main-draw entrants ==
=== Seeds ===
Country	Player	Rank^{1}	Seed
ROU	Monica Niculescu	59	1
GBR	Anne Keothavong	96	2
USA	Irina Falconi	81	3
GRE	Eleni Daniilidou	103	4
JPN	Misaki Doi	106	5
USA	Alison Riske	116	6
CAN	Stéphanie Dubois	107	7
POL	Urszula Radwańska	123	8

- ^{1} Rankings are as of August 1, 2011

=== Other entrants ===
The following players received wildcards into the singles main draw:

- (United States) Gail Brodsky
- (Canada) Eugenie Bouchard
- (Canada) Gabriela Dabrowski
- (United States) Amanda Fink

The following players received entry from the qualifying draw:

- (United States) Madison Brengle
- (Australia) Casey Dellacqua
- (Israel) Julia Glushko
- (Australia) Olivia Rogowska

== Champions ==
=== Men's singles ===
(United Kingdom) James Ward def. (United States) Robby Ginepri, 7–5, 6–4

=== Women's singles ===
(Canada) Aleksandra Wozniak def. (United States) Jamie Hampton, 6–3, 6–1

=== Men's doubles ===
(Philippines) Treat Conrad Huey / (United States) Travis Parrott def. (Australia) Jordan Kerr / (United States) David Martin, 6–2, 1–6, [16–14]

=== Women's doubles ===
(Czech Republic) Karolína Plíšková / (Czech Republic) Kristýna Plíšková def. (United States) Jamie Hampton / (Thailand) Noppawan Lertcheewakarn, 5–7, 6–2, [10–2]
