= 2011 Fifth Third Bank Tennis Championships – Men's singles =

Men's singles
- 2011 Fifth Third Bank Tennis Championships

Final
- Champion: (United States) Wayne Odesnik
- Runner-up: (United Kingdom) James Ward
- Score: 7–5, 6–4

Events
Singles	men	women
Doubles	men	women
← 2010 ·	Fifth Third Bank Tennis Championships	· 2012 →

Carsten Ball was the defending champion but lost in the second round to Blake Strode.

2nd seed Wayne Odesnik won the title, defeating 1st seed James Ward in the final, 7–5, 6–4.

== Seeds ==
1. (United Kingdom) James Ward (final)
2. (United States) Wayne Odesnik (champion)
3. (Australia) Chris Guccione (second round)
4. (South Africa) Fritz Wolmarans (second round)
5. (Australia) Carsten Ball (second round)
6. (United States) Michael Yani (quarterfinals)
7. (Serbia) Ilija Bozoljac (first round, retired)
8. (Bosnia and Herzegovina) Amer Delić (first round)

== Draw ==
=== Key ===
- Q = Qualifier
- WC = Wild card
- LL = Lucky loser
- Alt = Alternate
- SE = Special exempt
- PR = Protected ranking
- ITF = ITF entry
- JE = Junior exempt
- w/o = Walkover
- r = Retired
- d = Defaulted
- SR = Special ranking

=== Finals ===
Semifinals
1	(United Kingdom) James Ward	6	6
(Canada) Pierre-Ludovic Duclos	4	4
(United States) Greg Ouellette	0	0
2	(United States) Wayne Odesnik	6	6

Final
1	(United Kingdom) James Ward	5	4
2	(United States) Wayne Odesnik	7	6

=== Top half ===
First round
1	(United Kingdom) J Ward	6	6
(France) M Rodrigues	2	3
WC	(United States) R Williams	6	7^{7}
WC	(United States) Eric Quigley	3	6^{5}
WC	(France) A Musialek	4	6^{2}
(United States) N Monroe	6	7^{7}
(Canada) É Chvojka	7	7^{7}
8	(Bosnia and Herzegovina) A Delić	5	6^{4}
4	(South Africa) F Wolmarans	6	7
LL	(United States) J Cox	1	5
Alt	(Canada) P-L Duclos	6	6
Q	(United States) D Britton	2	3
Q	(United States) B Strode	6	4	4
(South Korea) D Yoo	3	6	0^{r}
(United Kingdom) D Cox	3	2
5	(Australia) C Ball	6	6

Second round
1	(United Kingdom) J Ward	6	7
WC	(United States) R Williams	4	5
(United States) N Monroe	3	3
(Canada) É Chvojka	6	6
4	(South Africa) F Wolmarans	2	4
(Canada) P-L Duclos	6	6
Q	(United States) B Strode	7	4	6
5	(Australia) C Ball	5	6	4

Quarterfinals
1	(United Kingdom) J Ward	3	7	6
(Canada) É Chvojka	6	5	1
(Canada) P-L Duclos	7^{7}	6
Q	(United States) B Strode	6^{2}	4

Semifinals
1	(United Kingdom) J Ward	6	6
(Canada) P-L Duclos	4	4

=== Bottom half ===
First round
7	(Serbia) I Bozoljac	0^{r}
Q	(United States) M McClune	4
(United States) J Levine	3	1^{r}
(United States) G Ouellette	6	0
(Japan) H Kondo	4	4
(United Kingdom) J Baker	6	6
(United Kingdom) J Milton	3	6^{4}
3	(Australia) C Guccione	6	7^{7}
6	(United States) M Yani	6	6
(United States) A El Mihdawy	2	4
WC	(United States) J Sock	6^{6}	1
(New Zealand) M Venus	7^{8}	6
(France) Clément Reix	4	2
Alt	(New Zealand) A Sitak	6	6
Q	(United States) C Buchanan	3	4
2	(United States) W Odesnik	6	6

Second round
Q	(United States) M McClune	3	0
(United States) G Ouellette	6	6
(United Kingdom) J Baker	7	7^{7}
3	(Australia) C Guccione	5	6^{4}
6	(United States) M Yani	7^{7}	6
(New Zealand) M Venus	6^{5}	3
Alt	(New Zealand) A Sitak	2	1
2	(United States) W Odesnik	6	6

Quarterfinals
(United States) G Ouellette	7	2
(United Kingdom) J Baker	5	0^{r}
6	(United States) M Yani	4	3
2	(United States) W Odesnik	6	6

Semifinals
(United States) G Ouellette	0	0
2	(United States) W Odesnik	6	6
