= 2011 Odlum Brown Vancouver Open – Men's singles =

Men's singles
- 2011 Odlum Brown Vancouver Open

Final
- Champion: (United Kingdom) James Ward
- Runner-up: (United States) Robby Ginepri
- Score: 7–5, 6–4

Events
| Singles | men | women |
| Doubles | men | women |
| ← 2010 · | Vancouver Open | · 2012 → |

Dudi Sela was the defending champion, but decided not to participate.

James Ward won the title. He defeated Robby Ginepri 7–5, 6–4 in the final.

== Seeds ==
1. (Chinese Taipei) Lu Yen-hsun (second round)
2. (United States) Bobby Reynolds (semifinals, withdrew to left oblique strain)
3. (Slovenia) Grega Žemlja (quarterfinals)
4. (Japan) Yuichi Sugita (first round)
5. (United Kingdom) James Ward (champion)
6. (Canada) Vasek Pospisil (semifinals)
7. (South Africa) Fritz Wolmarans (second round)
8. (Australia) Greg Jones (second round)

== Draw ==
=== Key ===
- Q = Qualifier
- WC = Wild card
- LL = Lucky loser
- Alt = Alternate
- SE = Special exempt
- PR = Protected ranking
- ITF = ITF entry
- JE = Junior exempt
- w/o = Walkover
- r = Retired
- d = Defaulted
- SR = Special ranking

=== Finals ===
Semifinals
5 | (United Kingdom) James Ward | 6 | 7
6 | (Canada) Vasek Pospisil | 4 | 5
(United States) Robby Ginepri | w/o
2 | (United States) Bobby Reynolds

Final
5 | (United Kingdom) James Ward | 7 | 6
(United States) Robby Ginepri | 5 | 4

=== Top half ===
First round
1 | (Chinese Taipei) Y-h Lu | 6 | 6
(Switzerland) G Bastl | 2 | 1
(United States) Greg Ouellette | 2 | 4
(United Kingdom) A Bogdanovic | 6 | 6
(Canada) É Chvojka | 6 | 2 | 6
(Canada) P-L Duclos | 2 | 6 | 0
(Australia) Mark Verryth | 4 | 0
5 | (United Kingdom) J Ward | 6 | 6
4 | (Japan) Y Sugita | 6^{5} | 2
(Moldova) R Borvanov | 7^{7} | 6
(Australia) C Ball | 7^{9} | 6
Q | (Japan) T Matsui | 6^{7} | 3
WC | (United States) B Klahn | 7^{7} | 6
Q | (United States) M McClune | 6^{2} | 2
(United States) M Yani | 7^{7} | 4 | 6^{1}
6 | (Canada) V Pospisil | 6^{3} | 6 | 7^{7}

Second round
1 | (Chinese Taipei) Y-h Lu | 4 | 6 | 3
(United Kingdom) A Bogdanovic | 6 | 3 | 6
(Canada) É Chvojka | 6 | 3 | 4
5 | (United Kingdom) J Ward | 4 | 6 | 6
(Moldova) R Borvanov | 6 | 6
(Australia) C Ball | 4 | 4
WC | (United States) B Klahn | 6^{5} | 3
6 | (Canada) V Pospisil | 7^{7} | 6

Quarterfinals
(United Kingdom) A Bogdanovic | 6^{6} | 6 | 3
5 | (United Kingdom) J Ward | 7^{8} | 2 | 6
(Moldova) R Borvanov | 3 | 2
6 | (Canada) V Pospisil | 6 | 6

Semifinals
5 | (United Kingdom) J Ward | 6 | 7
6 | (Canada) V Pospisil | 4 | 5

=== Bottom half ===
First round
8 | (Australia) G Jones | 6 | 6
WC | (United States) D Martin | 3 | 3
(United States) R Ginepri | 6 | 3 | 7
(United States) B Strode | 4 | 6 | 5
WC | (United States) S Johnson | 7^{7} | 6
Q | (United States) T Rettenmaier | 6^{5} | 4
(Canada) S Diez | 1 | 6^{6}
3 | (Slovenia) G Žemlja | 6 | 7^{8}
7 | (South Africa) F Wolmarans | 6^{6} | 6 | 6
WC | (United States) D Kosakowski | 7^{8} | 4 | 4
(United States) A El Mihdawy | 7^{7} | 3 | 4
(France) Clément Reix | 6^{4} | 6 | 6
(New Zealand) M Venus | 1 | 6 | 3
Q | (Slovenia) L Gregorc | 6 | 2 | 6
(Australia) B Mitchell | 0 | 1
2 | (United States) B Reynolds | 6 | 6

Second round
8 | (Australia) G Jones | 2 | 2
(United States) R Ginepri | 6 | 6
WC | (United States) S Johnson | 7^{7} | 2 | 3
3 | (Slovenia) G Žemlja | 6^{5} | 6 | 6
7 | (South Africa) F Wolmarans | 6 | 3 | 6^{9}
(France) C Reix | 4 | 6 | 7^{11}
Q | (Slovenia) L Gregorc | 4 | 6 | 2
2 | (United States) B Reynolds | 6 | 4 | 6

Quarterfinals
(United States) R Ginepri | 6 | 7^{9}
3 | (Slovenia) G Žemlja | 4 | 6^{7}
(France) C Reix | 3 | 0
2 | (United States) B Reynolds | 6 | 6

Semifinals
(United States) R Ginepri | w/o
2 | (United States) B Reynolds
