= 2012 Odlum Brown Vancouver Open =

- Date: July 30 – August 5
- Edition: 8th (men); 11th (women)
- Category: ATP Challenger Tour; ITF Women's Circuit
- Prize money: US$100,000 (men); US$100,000 (women)
- Surface: Hard – outdoors
- Location: West Vancouver, British Columbia, Canada
- Venue: Hollyburn Country Club

Champions

Men's singles
- (Netherlands) Igor Sijsling

Women's singles
- (United States) Mallory Burdette

Men's doubles
- (Belgium) Maxime Authom / (Belgium) Ruben Bemelmans

Women's doubles
- (Israel) Julia Glushko / (Australia) Olivia Rogowska
← 2011 ·	Vancouver Open	· 2013 →

The 2012 Odlum Brown Vancouver Open was a professional tennis tournament played on outdoor hard courts. It was the 8th edition, for men, and 11th edition, for women, of the tournament and part of the 2012 ATP Challenger Tour and the 2012 ITF Women's Circuit, offering totals of $100,000, for men, and $100,000, for women, in prize money. It took place in West Vancouver, British Columbia, Canada between July 30 and August 5, 2012.

== Men's singles main-draw entrants ==
=== Seeds ===
Country	Player	Rank^{1}	Seed
NED	Igor Sijsling	102	1
ISR	Dudi Sela	114	2
USA	Rajeev Ram	117	3
BEL	Ruben Bemelmans	121	4
CAN	Frank Dancevic	131	5
UKR	Sergei Bubka	151	6
THA	Danai Udomchoke	153	7
RSA	Izak van der Merwe	154	8

- ^{1} Rankings are as of July 23, 2012

=== Other entrants ===
The following players received wildcards into the singles main draw:

- (Canada) Philip Bester
- (United States) Bradley Klahn
- (Canada) Filip Peliwo
- (United States) Jack Sock

The following players received entry from the qualifying draw:

- (United States) Chase Buchanan
- (Canada) Pierre-Ludovic Duclos
- (France) Gleb Sakharov
- (South Africa) Fritz Wolmarans

== Women's singles main-draw entrants ==
=== Seeds ===
Country	Player	Rank^{1}	Seed
LUX	Mandy Minella	82	1
AUS	Olivia Rogowska	120	2
USA	Alexa Glatch	135	3
POL	Sandra Zaniewska	149	4
USA	Madison Brengle	159	5
AUS	Sacha Jones	172	6
USA	Grace Min	176	7
USA	Madison Keys	182	8

- ^{1} Rankings are as of July 23, 2012

=== Other entrants ===
The following players received wildcards into the singles main draw:

- (United States) Mallory Burdette
- (Canada) Gabriela Dabrowski
- (United States) Bethanie Mattek-Sands
- (Canada) Carol Zhao

The following players received entry from the qualifying draw:

- (United States) Lauren Embree
- (United States) Nicole Gibbs
- (United States) Krista Hardebeck
- (United States) Ashley Weinhold

The following player received entry as a lucky loser:

- (France) Sherazad Benamar

== Champions ==
=== Men's singles ===
- (Netherlands) Igor Sijsling def. (Ukraine) Sergei Bubka, 6–1, 7–5

=== Men's doubles ===
- (Belgium) Maxime Authom / (Belgium) Ruben Bemelmans def. (Australia) John Peers / (Australia) John-Patrick Smith, 6–4, 6–2

=== Women's singles ===
- (United States) Mallory Burdette def. (United States) Jessica Pegula, 6–3, 6–0

=== Women's doubles ===
- (Israel) Julia Glushko / (Australia) Olivia Rogowska def. (United States) Jacqueline Cako / (United States) Natalie Pluskota, 6–4, 5–7, [10–7]
