= 2012 Odlum Brown Vancouver Open – Women's doubles =

Women's doubles
- 2012 Odlum Brown Vancouver Open

Final
- Champions: (Israel) Julia Glushko (Australia) Olivia Rogowska
- Runners-up: (United States) Jacqueline Cako (United States) Natalie Pluskota
- Score: 6–4, 5–7, [10–7]

Events
Singles	men	women
Doubles	men	women
- Vancouver Open

Karolína Plíšková and Kristýna Plíšková were the defending champions, but both were participating in the 2012 Citi Open.

Julia Glushko and Olivia Rogowska won the title defeating Jacqueline Cako and Natalie Pluskota in the final 6–4, 5–7, [10–7].

== Seeds ==
1. (Luxembourg) Mandy Minella / (Ukraine) Olga Savchuk (quarterfinals, retired)
2. (United States) Alexa Glatch / (United States) Maria Sanchez (withdrew)
3. (United States) Jessica Pegula / (United States) Taylor Townsend (semifinals)
4. (Australia) Monique Adamczak / (Poland) Sandra Zaniewska (first round)

== Draw ==
Key

- Q = Qualifier
- WC = Wild card
- LL = Lucky loser
- Alt = Alternate
- ITF = ITF entry
- PR = Protected ranking
- SR = Special ranking
- SE = Special exempt
- JE = Junior exempt
- JR = Junior Accelerator Programme entrant
- CO = College Accelerator Programme entrant
- NG = Next Gen Accelerator Program entrant
- w/o = Walkover
- r = Retired
- d = Defaulted

=== Draw ===
First round
1	(Luxembourg) M Minella (Ukraine) O Savchuk	6	7^{7}
(Australia) B Bobusic (United Kingdom) E Webley-Smith	4	6^{5}
Q	(United States) J Abaza (Indonesia) R Tedjakusuma	1	0
Q	(United States) J Cako (United States) N Pluskota	6	6
3	(United States) J Pegula (United States) T Townsend	6	6
(United States) M Burdette (United States) N Gibbs	4	3
(United States) J Boserup (United States) C Scholl	6	3	[6]
(United States) E Lumpkin (United States) A Weinhold	3	6	[10]
(United States) L Embree (United States) S Rogers	6	6
(Canada) G Dabrowski (Canada) H El Tabakh	4	2
(Japan) M Miyamura (Brazil) T Pereira	4	6	[10]
4	(Australia) M Adamczak (Poland) S Zaniewska	6	3	[8]
(United States) M Brengle (United Kingdom) N Broady	6^{5}	4
(Israel) J Glushko (Australia) O Rogowska	7^{7}	6
(Serbia) A Krunić (Israel) K Shlomo	w/o
2	(United States) A Glatch (United States) M Sanchez

Quarterfinals
1	(Luxembourg) M Minella (Ukraine) O Savchuk	2^{r}
Q	(United States) J Cako (United States) N Pluskota	3
3	(United States) J Pegula (United States) T Townsend	6	6
(United States) E Lumpkin (United States) A Weinhold	3	2
(United States) L Embree (United States) S Rogers	6	6^{5}	[13]
(Japan) M Miyamura (Brazil) T Pereira	4	7^{7}	[11]
(Israel) J Glushko (Australia) O Rogowska	6	6
(Serbia) A Krunić (Israel) K Shlomo	1	1

Semifinals
Q	(United States) J Cako (United States) N Pluskota	3	6	[10]
3	(United States) J Pegula (United States) T Townsend	6	3	[8]
(United States) L Embree (United States) S Rogers	6^{4}	2
(Israel) J Glushko (Australia) O Rogowska	7^{7}	6

Finals
Q	(United States) J Cako (United States) N Pluskota	4	7	[7]
(Israel) J Glushko (Australia) O Rogowska	6	5	[10]
