= 2010 Odlum Brown Vancouver Open – Men's doubles =

Men's doubles
- 2010 Odlum Brown Vancouver Open

Final
- Champions: (Philippines) Treat Conrad Huey (United Kingdom) Dominic Inglot
- Runners-up: (United States) Ryan Harrison (United States) Jesse Levine
- Score: 6–4, 7–5

Events
Singles	men	women
Doubles	men	women
← 2009 ·	Vancouver Open	· 2011 →

Kevin Anderson and Rik de Voest were the defending champions, but only de Voest chose to compete this year.
He partnered with Bobby Reynolds, but they lost to Colin Fleming and Ken Skupski in the quarterfinal.
Treat Conrad Huey and Dominic Inglot won the tournament after a win against Ryan Harrison and Jesse Levine 6–4, 7–5 in the final.

== Seeds ==
1. (Australia) Jordan Kerr / (Germany) Michael Kohlmann (first round)
2. (United Kingdom) Colin Fleming / (United Kingdom) Ken Skupski (semifinals)
3. (United States) Eric Butorac / (Netherlands Antilles) Jean-Julien Rojer (first round)
4. (Thailand) Sanchai Ratiwatana / (Thailand) Sonchat Ratiwatana (first round)

== Draw ==
=== Key ===
- Q = Qualifier
- WC = Wild card
- LL = Lucky loser
- Alt = Alternate
- SE = Special exempt
- PR = Protected ranking
- ITF = ITF entry
- JE = Junior exempt
- w/o = Walkover
- r = Retired
- d = Defaulted
- SR = Special ranking

=== Draw ===
First round
1	(Australia) J Kerr (Germany) M Kohlmann	7	6^{4}	[7]
(United States) L Cook (United States) D Martin	5	7	[10]
Q	(Australia) A Feeney (Australia) B Klein	4	4
(Australia) S Huss (Australia) J Sirianni	6	6
3	(United States) E Butorac (Netherlands Antilles) J-J Rojer	1	6	[2]
(Philippines) TC Huey (United Kingdom) D Inglot	6	3	[10]
(United States) S Lipsky (United States) T Parrott	7	6
(Serbia) I Bozoljac (United States) T Smyczek	6^{11}	3
(United Kingdom) R Hutchins (Israel) H Levy	3	4
WC	(United States) R Harrison (United States) J Levine	6	6
(United States) R Kendrick (United States) J Witten	6	6
4	(Thailand) Sa Ratiwatana (Thailand) So Ratiwatana	1	2
PR	(South Africa) R de Voest (United States) B Reynolds	7	6
WC	(Canada) D Chu (Canada) V Pospisil	6^{2}	4
WC	(United States) A Collarini (United States) A Kuznetsov	4	6^{8}
2	(United Kingdom) C Fleming (United Kingdom) K Skupski	6	7

Quarterfinals
(United States) L Cook (United States) D Martin	6	6
(Australia) S Huss (Australia) J Sirianni	2	1
(Philippines) TC Huey (United Kingdom) D Inglot	5	6	[10]
(United States) S Lipsky (United States) T Parrott	7	4	[6]
WC	(United States) R Harrison (United States) J Levine	4	6	[10]
(United States) R Kendrick (United States) J Witten	6	3	[4]
PR	(South Africa) R de Voest (United States) B Reynolds	5	7	[7]
2	(United Kingdom) C Fleming (United Kingdom) K Skupski	7	6^{5}	[10]

Semifinals
(United States) L Cook (United States) D Martin	3	3
(Philippines) TC Huey (United Kingdom) D Inglot	6	6
WC	(United States) R Harrison (United States) J Levine	2	7	[10]
2	(United Kingdom) C Fleming (United Kingdom) K Skupski	6	6^{4}	[6]

Finals
(Philippines) TC Huey (United Kingdom) D Inglot	6	7
WC	(United States) R Harrison (United States) J Levine	4	5
