= 2011 Fifth Third Bank Tennis Championships – Men's doubles =

Men's doubles
- 2011 Fifth Third Bank Tennis Championships

Final
- Champions: (Australia) Jordan Kerr (United States) David Martin
- Runners-up: (United Kingdom) James Ward (United States) Michael Yani
- Score: 6–3, 6–4

Events
Singles	men	women
Doubles	men	women
- Fifth Third Bank Tennis Championships

Raven Klaasen and Izak van der Merwe were the defending champions, but they both chose to not participate this year.

Jordan Kerr and David Martin won the tournament by defeating James Ward and Michael Yani in the final, 6–3, 6–4.

== Seeds ==
1. (Australia) Jordan Kerr / (United States) David Martin (champions)
2. (Canada) Pierre-Ludovic Duclos / (India) Purav Raja (first round)
3. (United States) Nicholas Monroe / (New Zealand) Artem Sitak (first round)
4. (Bosnia and Herzegovina) Amer Delić / (United Kingdom) Ken Skupski (withdrew)

== Draw ==
Key

- Q = Qualifier
- WC = Wild card
- LL = Lucky loser
- Alt = Alternate
- ITF = ITF entry
- PR = Protected ranking
- SR = Special ranking
- SE = Special exempt
- JE = Junior exempt
- JR = Junior Accelerator Programme entrant
- CO = College Accelerator Programme entrant
- NG = Next Gen Accelerator Program entrant
- w/o = Walkover
- r = Retired
- d = Defaulted

=== Draw ===
First round
1	(Australia) J Kerr (United States) D Martin	6	6
(United States) S Bangoura (United States) J Cox	3	2
(Japan) H Kondo (Japan) B Sato	7^{7}	6
(Philippines) R Gonzales (United States) Chris Kwon	6^{4}	1
3	(United States) N Monroe (New Zealand) A Sitak	3	6	[3]
(United States) A El Mihdawy (South Korea) D Yoo	6	2	[10]
(United States) M McClune (United States) Greg Ouellette	7^{7}	6^{2}	[6]
WC	(United States) C Buchanan (United States) A Krajicek	6^{1}	7	[10]
WC	(United States) J Sock (United States) R Williams	6	6
(Canada) É Chvojka (New Zealand) M Venus	1	4
Alt	(United States) Phillip Arndt (United States) D Britton	6	6
Alt	(Barbados) D King (United States) Mark Oljaca	4	2
WC	(United States) Bradley Cox (United States) Eric Quigley	3	4
(France) Clément Reix (France) M Rodrigues	6	6
(United Kingdom) J Ward (United States) M Yani	2	6	[10]
2	(Canada) P-L Duclos (India) P Raja	6	1	[5]

Quarterfinals
1	(Australia) J Kerr (United States) D Martin	6	6
(Japan) H Kondo (Japan) B Sato	1	3
(United States) A El Mihdawy (South Korea) D Yoo	6	2	[10]
WC	(United States) C Buchanan (United States) A Krajicek	1	6	[5]
WC	(United States) J Sock (United States) R Williams	5	2
Alt	(United States) Phillip Arndt (United States) D Britton	7	6
(France) Clément Reix (France) Mathieu Rodrigues	2	3
(United Kingdom) J Ward (United States) M Yani	6	6

Semifinals
1	(Australia) J Kerr (United States) D Martin	6	6
(United States) A El Mihdawy (South Korea) D Yoo	0	1
Alt	(United States) Phillip Arndt (United States) D Britton	4	1
(United Kingdom) J Ward (United States) M Yani	6	6

Final
1	(Australia) J Kerr (United States) D Martin	6	6
(United Kingdom) J Ward (United States) M Yani	3	4
