= 2010 Odlum Brown Vancouver Open – Men's singles =

Men's singles
- 2010 Odlum Brown Vancouver Open

Final
- Champion: (Israel) Dudi Sela
- Runner-up: (Lithuania) Ričardas Berankis
- Score: 7–5, 6–2

Events
Singles	men	women
Doubles	men	women
← 2009 ·	Vancouver Open	· 2011 →

Marcos Baghdatis was the defending champion, but chose to compete in ATP 500 in Washington instead.
Dudi Sela won the title, defeating Ričardas Berankis 7–5, 6–2 in the finals.

== Seeds ==
1. (United States) Taylor Dent (semifinals)
2. (Germany) Tobias Kamke (second round)
3. (Israel) Dudi Sela (champion)
4. (Lithuania) Ričardas Berankis (final)
5. (Serbia) Ilija Bozoljac (first round)
6. (United States) Jesse Levine (quarterfinals)
7. (United States) Robert Kendrick (second round)
8. (United States) Jesse Witten (first round)

== Draw ==
=== Key ===
- Q = Qualifier
- WC = Wild card
- LL = Lucky loser
- Alt = Alternate
- SE = Special exempt
- PR = Protected ranking
- ITF = ITF entry
- JE = Junior exempt
- w/o = Walkover
- r = Retired
- d = Defaulted
- SR = Special ranking

=== Finals ===
Semifinals
1	(United States) Taylor Dent	6	4	1
3	(Israel) Dudi Sela	3	6	6
4	(Lithuania) Ričardas Berankis	6	6
(United States) Lester Cook	3	3

Final
3	(Israel) Dudi Sela	7	6
4	(Lithuania) Ričardas Berankis	5	2

=== Top half ===
First round
1	(United States) T Dent	6	5	6
(Canada) P Polansky	3	7	2
WC	(Canada) P Bester	6	6^{5}	4
(Australia) N Lindahl	4	7	6
SE	(Canada) F Dancevic	3	4
(Israel) H Levy	6	6
PR	(United States) B Reynolds	7	6
5	(Serbia) I Bozoljac	5	3
3	(Israel) D Sela	6^{3}	6	6
Q	(Australia) B Klein	7	1	4
(Chile) P Capdeville	6	6
WC	(Canada) V Pospisil	4	4
(Australia) M Ebden	6^{6}	2
(Australia) M Matosevic	7	6
ALT	(Australia) C Guccione	3	6	6
8	(United States) J Witten	6	3	2

Second round
1	(United States) T Dent	6	6
(Australia) N Lindahl	1	1
(Israel) H Levy	5	4
PR	(United States) B Reynolds	7	6
3	(Israel) D Sela	4	6	6
(Chile) P Capdeville	6	2	0
(Australia) M Matosevic	4	6	7
ALT	(Australia) C Guccione	6	2	5

Quarterfinals
1	(United States) T Dent	6	3	6
PR	(United States) B Reynolds	3	6	0
3	(Israel) D Sela	6	4	7
(Australia) M Matosevic	4	6	6^{4}

Semifinals
1	(United States) T Dent	6	4	1
3	(Israel) D Sela	3	6	6

=== Bottom half ===
First round
6	(United States) J Levine	6	6
WC	(United States) R Harrison	4	4
Q	(Canada) S Diez	5	7	4
Q	(United States) A Kuznetsov	7	6^{4}	6
(United States) M Yani	5	5
(Luxembourg) G Müller	7	7
WC	(United States) A Collarini	4	5
4	(Lithuania) R Berankis	6	7
7	(United States) R Kendrick	7	6
SE	(Canada) M Raonic	6^{3}	4
(United States) L Cook	3	6	7
(United Kingdom) A Bogdanovic	6	2	6^{5}
Q	(United Kingdom) J Ward	3	6	6
(South Africa) R de Voest	6	2	4
(United States) T Smyczek	6	4	1
2	(Germany) T Kamke	1	6	6

Second round
6	(United States) J Levine	6	6
Q	(United States) A Kuznetsov	4	4
(Luxembourg) G Müller	4	4
4	(Lithuania) R Berankis	6	6
7	(United States) R Kendrick	3	3
(United States) L Cook	6	6
Q	(United Kingdom) J Ward	6	6
2	(Germany) T Kamke	4	2

Quarterfinals
6	(United States) J Levine	3	4
4	(Lithuania) R Berankis	6	6
(United States) L Cook	6	7
Q	(United Kingdom) J Ward	2	5

Semifinals
4	(Lithuania) R Berankis	6	6
(United States) L Cook	3	3
