= 2012 Odlum Brown Vancouver Open – Women's singles =

Women's singles
- 2012 Odlum Brown Vancouver Open

Final
- Champion: (United States) Mallory Burdette
- Runner-up: (United States) Jessica Pegula
- Score: 6–3, 6–0

Events
| Singles | men | women |
| Doubles | men | women |
- Vancouver Open

Aleksandra Wozniak was the defending champion, but qualified for the 2012 Summer Olympics.

Mallory Burdette won the title, defeating Jessica Pegula 6–3, 6–0 in the final.

== Seeds ==
1. (Luxembourg) Mandy Minella (first round)
2. (Australia) Olivia Rogowska (quarterfinals)
3. (United States) Alexa Glatch (first round)
4. (Poland) Sandra Zaniewska (first round, retired)
5. (United States) Madison Brengle (first round)
6. (Australia) Sacha Jones (first round)
7. (United States) Grace Min (withdrew)
8. (United States) Madison Keys (quarterfinals)

== Draw ==
Key

- Q = Qualifier
- WC = Wild card
- LL = Lucky loser
- Alt = Alternate
- ITF = ITF entry
- PR = Protected ranking
- SR = Special ranking
- SE = Special exempt
- JE = Junior exempt
- JR = Junior Accelerator Programme entrant
- CO = College Accelerator Programme entrant
- NG = Next Gen Accelerator Program entrant
- w/o = Walkover
- r = Retired
- d = Defaulted

=== Finals ===
Semifinals
(United States) Jessica Pegula | 6 | 6
(Israel) Julia Glushko | 2 | 3
(United States) Chichi Scholl | 2 | 3
WC | (United States) Mallory Burdette | 6 | 6

Final
(United States) Jessica Pegula | 3 | 0
WC | (United States) Mallory Burdette | 6 | 6

=== Top half ===
First round
1 | (Luxembourg) M Minella | 3 | 5
(United States) J Pegula | 6 | 7
(United States) G Brodsky | 4 | 6 | 6^{7}
(Australia) B Bobusic | 6 | 3 | 7^{9}
(Serbia) A Krunić | 4 | 3
(United States) J Boserup | 6 | 6
Q | (United States) N Gibbs | 6 | 2 | 6
5 | (United States) M Brengle | 4 | 6 | 2
3 | (United States) A Glatch | 3 | 4
WC | (Canada) G Dabrowski | 6 | 6
Q | (United States) L Embree | 5 | 3
(Israel) J Glushko | 7 | 6
Q | (United States) K Hardebeck | 3 | 6 | 7
Q | (United States) A Weinhold | 6 | 2 | 5
WC | (Canada) C Zhao | 0 | 2
8 | (United States) M Keys | 6 | 6

Second round
(United States) J Pegula | w/o
(Australia) B Bobusic
(United States) J Boserup | 6 | 6
Q | (United States) N Gibbs | 1 | 1
WC | (Canada) G Dabrowski | 5 | 1
(Israel) J Glushko | 7 | 6
Q | (United States) K Hardebeck | 1 | 2
8 | (United States) M Keys | 6 | 6

Quarterfinals
(United States) J Pegula | 6 | 6
(United States) J Boserup | 4 | 1
(Israel) J Glushko | 1 | 6 | 6
8 | (United States) M Keys | 6 | 2 | 3

Semifinals
(United States) J Pegula | 6 | 6
(Israel) J Glushko | 2 | 3

=== Bottom half ===
First round
6 | (Australia) S Jones | 6 | 5 | 3
(Canada) S Fichman | 2 | 7 | 6
(Australia) M Adamczak | 6 | 6
(United Kingdom) J Konta | 4 | 1
(United Kingdom) N Broady | 1 | 4
(United States) C Scholl | 6 | 6
(Brazil) T Pereira | 7
4 | (Poland) S Zaniewska | 5 | r
LL | (France) S Benamar | 1 | 2
WC | (United States) M Burdette | 6 | 6
(Canada) M-È Pelletier | 6 | 4 | 5
(Ukraine) O Savchuk | 4 | 6 | 7
(Canada) H El Tabakh | 2 | 1
(United States) M Sanchez | 6 | 6
WC | (United States) B Mattek-Sands | 3 | 4
2 | (Australia) O Rogowska | 6 | 6

Second round
(Canada) S Fichman | 6 | 2 | 4
(Australia) M Adamczak | 0 | 6 | 6
(United States) C Scholl | 7^{8} | 4 | 7^{7}
(Brazil) T Pereira | 6^{6} | 6 | 6^{5}
WC | (United States) M Burdette | 6 | 6
(Ukraine) O Savchuk | 0 | 3
(United States) M Sanchez | 6 | 2 | 3
2 | (Australia) O Rogowska | 2 | 6 | 6

Quarterfinals
(Australia) M Adamczak | 5 | 6^{2}
(United States) C Scholl | 7 | 7^{7}
WC | (United States) M Burdette | 7 | 6
2 | (Australia) O Rogowska | 5 | 4

Semifinals
(United States) C Scholl | 2 | 3
WC | (United States) M Burdette | 6 | 6
