= 2012 Odlum Brown Vancouver Open – Men's singles =

Men's singles
- 2012 Odlum Brown Vancouver Open

Final
- Champion: (Netherlands) Igor Sijsling
- Runner-up: (Ukraine) Sergei Bubka
- Score: 6–1, 7–5

Events
Singles	men	women
Doubles	men	women
← 2011 ·	Vancouver Open	· 2013 →

James Ward was the defending champion, but decided not to participate. Igor Sijsling won the title, defeating Sergei Bubka 6–1, 7–5 in the final.

== Seeds ==
1. (Netherlands) Igor Sijsling (champion)
2. (Israel) Dudi Sela (semifinals)
3. (United States) Rajeev Ram (first round)
4. (Belgium) Ruben Bemelmans (quarterfinals)
5. (Canada) Frank Dancevic (semifinals)
6. (Ukraine) Sergei Bubka (final)
7. (Thailand) Danai Udomchoke (quarterfinals)
8. (South Africa) Izak van der Merwe (first round)

== Draw ==
=== Key ===
- Q = Qualifier
- WC = Wild card
- LL = Lucky loser
- Alt = Alternate
- SE = Special exempt
- PR = Protected ranking
- ITF = ITF entry
- JE = Junior exempt
- w/o = Walkover
- r = Retired
- d = Defaulted
- SR = Special ranking

=== Finals ===
Semifinals
1	(Netherlands) Igor Sijsling	6^{2}	6	7^{7}
5	(Canada) Frank Dancevic	7^{7}	3	6^{2}
6	(Ukraine) Sergei Bubka	6	7^{7}
2	(Israel) Dudi Sela	2	6^{5}

Final
1	(Netherlands) Igor Sijsling	6	7
6	(Ukraine) Sergei Bubka	1	5

=== Top half ===
First round
1	(Netherlands) I Sijsling	6	6
(France) A Mannarino	2	1
(Belgium) M Authom	5	6	6
(United States) A Kuznetsov	7	2	4
(Canada) P Polansky	6	4	6^{3}
(United States) D Kudla	1	6	7^{7}
(Australia) B Mitchell	0	2
7	(Thailand) D Udomchoke	6	6
4	(Belgium) R Bemelmans	6	6
(Moldova) R Borvanov	0	1
Q	(France) G Sakharov	7^{7}	5	6
WC	(Canada) P Bester	6^{4}	7	4
WC	(United States) J Sock	6	7^{9}
(South Africa) R de Voest	4	6^{7}
Q	(United States) C Buchanan	1	2
5	(Canada) F Dancevic	6	6

Second round
1	(Netherlands) I Sijsling	6	6
(Belgium) M Authom	2	1
(United States) D Kudla	2	5
7	(Thailand) D Udomchoke	6	7
4	(Belgium) R Bemelmans	6	6
Q	(France) G Sakharov	2	2
WC	(United States) J Sock	6	4	1
5	(Canada) F Dancevic	4	6	6

Quarterfinals
1	(Netherlands) I Sijsling	6	6
7	(Thailand) D Udomchoke	1	3
4	(Belgium) R Bemelmans	4	2
5	(Canada) F Dancevic	6	6

Semifinals
1	(Netherlands) I Sijsling	6^{2}	6	7^{7}
5	(Canada) F Dancevic	7^{7}	3	6^{2}

=== Bottom half ===
First round
6	(Ukraine) S Bubka	6^{5}	7^{7}	6
Q	(South Africa) F Wolmarans	7^{7}	6^{3}	2
(United States) M Yani	6	0	6^{5}
WC	(United States) B Klahn	4	6	7^{7}
(Chinese Taipei) J Wang	7^{7}	6
WC	(Canada) F Peliwo	6^{4}	0
Q	(Canada) P Duclos	6	7^{7}
3/SE	(United States) R Ram	2	6^{5}
8	(South Africa) I van der Merwe	6^{2}	3
(Australia) J Duckworth	7^{7}	6
(United Kingdom) J Baker	4	4
(Canada) S Diez	6	6
(Czech Republic) J Hernych	6	7
(Australia) J-P Smith	3	5
(Israel) A Weintraub	4	6	2
2	(Israel) D Sela	6	3	6

Second round
6	(Ukraine) S Bubka	3	6	6
WC	(United States) B Klahn	6	3	4
(Chinese Taipei) J Wang	6	6
(Canada) P Duclos	3	3
(Australia) J Duckworth	2	6	1
(Canada) S Diez	6	4	6
(Czech Republic) J Hernych	4	4
2	(Israel) D Sela	6	6

Quarterfinals
6	(Ukraine) S Bubka	6	3	6
(Chinese Taipei) J Wang	1	6	1
(Canada) S Diez	4	3
2	(Israel) D Sela	6	6

Semifinals
6	(Ukraine) S Bubka	6	7^{7}
2	(Israel) D Sela	2	6^{5}
