= 2012 Odlum Brown Vancouver Open – Men's doubles =

Men's doubles
- 2012 Odlum Brown Vancouver Open

Final
- Champions: (Belgium) Maxime Authom (Belgium) Ruben Bemelmans
- Runners-up: (Australia) John Peers (Australia) John-Patrick Smith
- Score: 6–4, 6–2

Events
Singles	men	women
Doubles	men	women
- Vancouver Open

Treat Conrad Huey and Travis Parrott were the defending champions, but decided not to compete.
Maxime Authom and Ruben Bemelmans won the title, defeating John Peers and John-Patrick Smith 6–4, 6–2 in the final.

== Seeds ==
1. (United States) John Paul Fruttero / (United States) Rajeev Ram (quarterfinals)
2. (Australia) Colin Ebelthite / (Australia) Jordan Kerr (first round)
3. (South Africa) Raven Klaasen / (South Africa) Izak van der Merwe (quarterfinals)
4. (Australia) John Peers / (Australia) John-Patrick Smith (final)

== Draw ==
Key

- Q = Qualifier
- WC = Wild card
- LL = Lucky loser
- Alt = Alternate
- ITF = ITF entry
- PR = Protected ranking
- SR = Special ranking
- SE = Special exempt
- JE = Junior exempt
- JR = Junior Accelerator Programme entrant
- CO = College Accelerator Programme entrant
- NG = Next Gen Accelerator Program entrant
- w/o = Walkover
- r = Retired
- d = Defaulted

=== Draw ===
First round
1	(United States) JP Fruttero (United States) R Ram	7^{9}	6
(South Africa) R de Voest (Canada) A Shamasdin	6^{7}	3
WC	(United States) D Britton (United States) A Krajicek	6	6
Q	(United States) C Buchanan (United States) B Klahn	2	2
4	(Australia) J Peers (Australia) J-P Smith	6	7
(United States) A Kuznetsov (Canada) P Polansky	3	5
(United States) N Monroe (United States) J Sock	6	6
(Moldova) R Borvanov (Israel) A Weintraub	2	2
(Canada) P Duclos (Netherlands) I Sijsling	2	6	[5]
(Thailand) D Udomchoke (Chinese Taipei) J Wang	6	4	[10]
WC	(Israel) D Sela (Israel) Harel Srugo	4	4
3	(South Africa) R Klaasen (South Africa) I van der Merwe	6	6
LL	(Canada) P Bester (United States) P Simmonds	6	6
(Australia) C Guccione (Australia) Matt Reid	3	4
(Belgium) M Authom (Belgium) R Bemelmans	6	7
2	(Australia) C Ebelthite (Australia) J Kerr	3	5

Quarterfinals
1	(United States) JP Fruttero (United States) R Ram	3	2
WC	(United States) D Britton (United States) A Krajicek	6	6
4	(Australia) J Peers (Australia) J-P Smith	6	6
(United States) N Monroe (United States) J Sock	2	3
(Thailand) D Udomchoke (Chinese Taipei) J Wang	1	6	[11]
3	(South Africa) R Klaasen (South Africa) I van der Merwe	6	2	[9]
LL	(Canada) P Bester (United States) P Simmonds	6^{4}	6	[8]
(Belgium) M Authom (Belgium) R Bemelmans	7^{7}	4	[10]

Semifinals
WC	(United States) D Britton (United States) A Krajicek	6	3	[5]
4	(Australia) J Peers (Australia) J-P Smith	3	6	[10]
(Thailand) D Udomchoke (Chinese Taipei) J Wang	4	6^{4}
(Belgium) M Authom (Belgium) R Bemelmans	6	7^{7}

Final
4	(Australia) J Peers (Australia) J-P Smith	4	2
(Belgium) M Authom (Belgium) R Bemelmans	6	6
