= Hilary Barte =

American tennis player

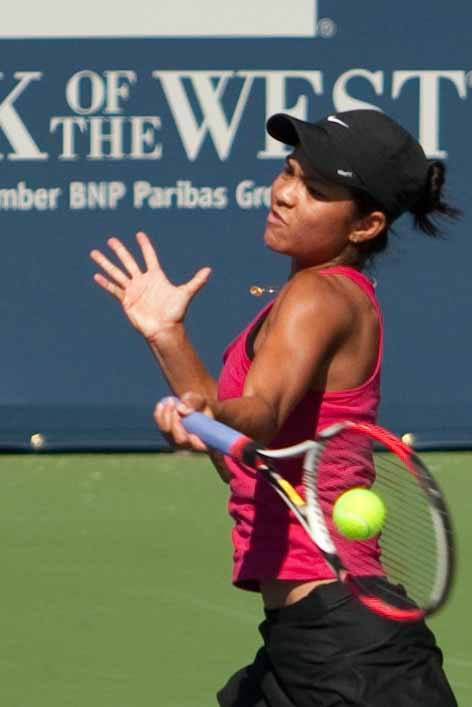
- Country (sports): United States
- Turned pro: 2006
- Retired: 2011

Singles
- Career record: 42-32
- Career titles: 0 WTA, 1 ITF
- Highest ranking: No. 455 (November 26, 2007)

Doubles
- Career record: 9-17
- Highest ranking: No. 330 (December 19, 2011)

Grand Slam doubles results
- US Open: 2R (2011)
- Last updated on: October 7, 2013.

Hilary Barte is an American professional tennis player.

== College ==
Barte played #1 singles and made All-American in singles and doubles all four years while at Stanford. She won the NCAA doubles title with Mallory Burdette at the 2011 NCAA Championships, having previously won the title with Mallory's sister Lindsay in 2010.

== Career ==
Barte has won one ITF tournament, a $10,000 donated tournament in Ciudad Obregón. In the final she beat Erika Clarke of Mexico.

She competed at the 2011 US Open Doubles Tournament as a wildcard entrant with her partner Mallory Burdette. In the first round they beat Glatch/Hampton of the United States. They lost in the second round to Andreja Klepač from Slovenia and Anna Tatishvili from Georgia.
