= Amanda Fink =

American tennis player

- Country (sports): United States
- Born: December 4, 1986 (age 38); Tarzana, California
- Retired: 2013
- Prize money: $56,351

Singles
- Career record: 114–92
- Career titles: 1 ITF
- Highest ranking: No. 260 (November 21, 2011)

Doubles
- Career record: 58–62
- Career titles: 3 ITF
- Highest ranking: No. 228 (September 27, 2010)

Amanda Michelle Fink (born December 4, 1986) is a retired American tennis player. She ranked No. 1 in the US in Under-16s. In 2006, she was the number-one ranked college freshman, and in 2008 she finished the season as the U.S. No. 5 ranked collegiate player. On November 21, 2011, she reached her highest WTA singles ranking of 260, while her best doubles ranking was 228 on September 27, 2010.

== Early life ==
Fink was born in Tarzana, California, the daughter of Howard and Laurie Fink, and is Jewish. She has one sister, Jamie.

== Tennis career ==
Fink attended Calabasas High School (class of 2005). She was named California Interscholastic Federation (CIF) MVP in doubles in 2002 and singles MVP in 2003, 2004, and 2005, named Ventura County Star All-Area Player of the Year in 2003, and an All-American in 2004 and 2005. She placed third in the 2002 Clay Court Nationals, and won the 2005 Hawaii National Open. She ranked No. 1 in the US in under-16s, and No. 2 in the under-18s.

In college at the University of Southern California, where Fink majored in psychology, she was a four-time college All-American and four-time Pac-10 selection in both tennis singles and doubles.

Fink was the No. 1 ranked college freshman, and the Pac-10 Freshman of the Year. In her freshman year in 2006 Fink was named the Intercollegiate Tennis Association (ITA) Rookie of the Year and ended the year ranked No. 8. She won the ITA Western Regional Championship.

In 2008, she was named an ITA All-American for singles and doubles, All-Pac-10 First Team, and Pac-10 All-Academic honorable mention. Fink finished the season as the U.S. No. 5 ranked collegiate player. Fink won the Freeman Memorial Singles Championship. In doubles, teamed up with Gabriela Niculescu, she won the 2008 Pac-10 Doubles Championship, won the ITA West Regional doubles title, and finished the season ranked No. 4 in the nation.

In 2015, she was inducted into the Southern California Jewish Sports Hall of Fame.

== ITF Circuit finals ==
=== Singles: 4 (1 title, 3 runner-ups) ===
$100,000 tournaments
$75,000 tournaments
$50,000 tournaments
$25,000 tournaments
$10,000 tournaments

Result	No.	Date	Tournament	Surface	Opponent	Score
Loss	1.	Jul 2008	ITF Allentown, United States	Hard	(Venezuela) Milagros Sequera	2–6, 0–6
Win	2.	Jul 2008	ITF Atlanta, United States	Hard	(Bulgaria) Svetlana Krivencheva	6–3, 6–2
Loss	3.	Mar 2011	ITF Metepec, Mexico	Hard	(Brazil) Teliana Pereira	4–6, 4–6
Loss	4.	Jul 2011	ITF Lexington, United States	Hard	(United States) Chiara Scholl	1–6, 1–6

=== Doubles: 7 (3 title, 4 runner-ups) ===
Outcome	No.	Date	Tournament	Surface	Partner	Opponents	Score
Runner-up	1	19 July 2009	Atlanta, United States	Hard	(United States) Yasmin Schnack	(United States) Kaitlyn Christian (United States) Lindsey Nelson	5–7, 6–7^{(2)}
Winner	2	23 November 2009	Puebla, Mexico	Hard	(United States) Elizabeth Lumpkin	(Argentina) Florencia Molinero (Brazil) Maria Fernanda Alves	6–4, 6–7^{(6)}, [10–8]
Winner	3	12 December 2009	Xalapa, Mexico	Hard	(United States) Elizabeth Lumpkin	(Brazil) Vivian Segnini (Slovakia) Dominika Diešková	5–7, 6–2, [15–13]
Runner-up	4	14 February 2010	Laguna Niguel, United States	Hard	(United States) Elizabeth Lumpkin	(Russia) Anastasia Pivovarova (Germany) Laura Siegemund	2–6, 3–6
Winner	5	8 March 2010	Metepec, Mexico	Clay	(United States) Elizabeth Lumpkin	(Brazil) Maria Fernanda Alves (Mexico) Daniela Múñoz Gallegos	6–3, 5–7, [10–8]
Runner-up	6	7 August 2010	Vancouver, Canada	Hard	(United States) Irina Falconi	(Chinese Taipei) Chang Kai-chen (Canada) Heidi El Tabakh	6–3, 3–6, [4–10]
Runner-up	7	6 June 2011	El Paso, United States	Hard	(United States) Yasmin Schnack	(Ukraine) Alyona Sotnikova (United States) Chiara Scholl	5–7, 6–4, [8–10]
