= Heidi El Tabakh =

Egyptian and Canadian tennis player

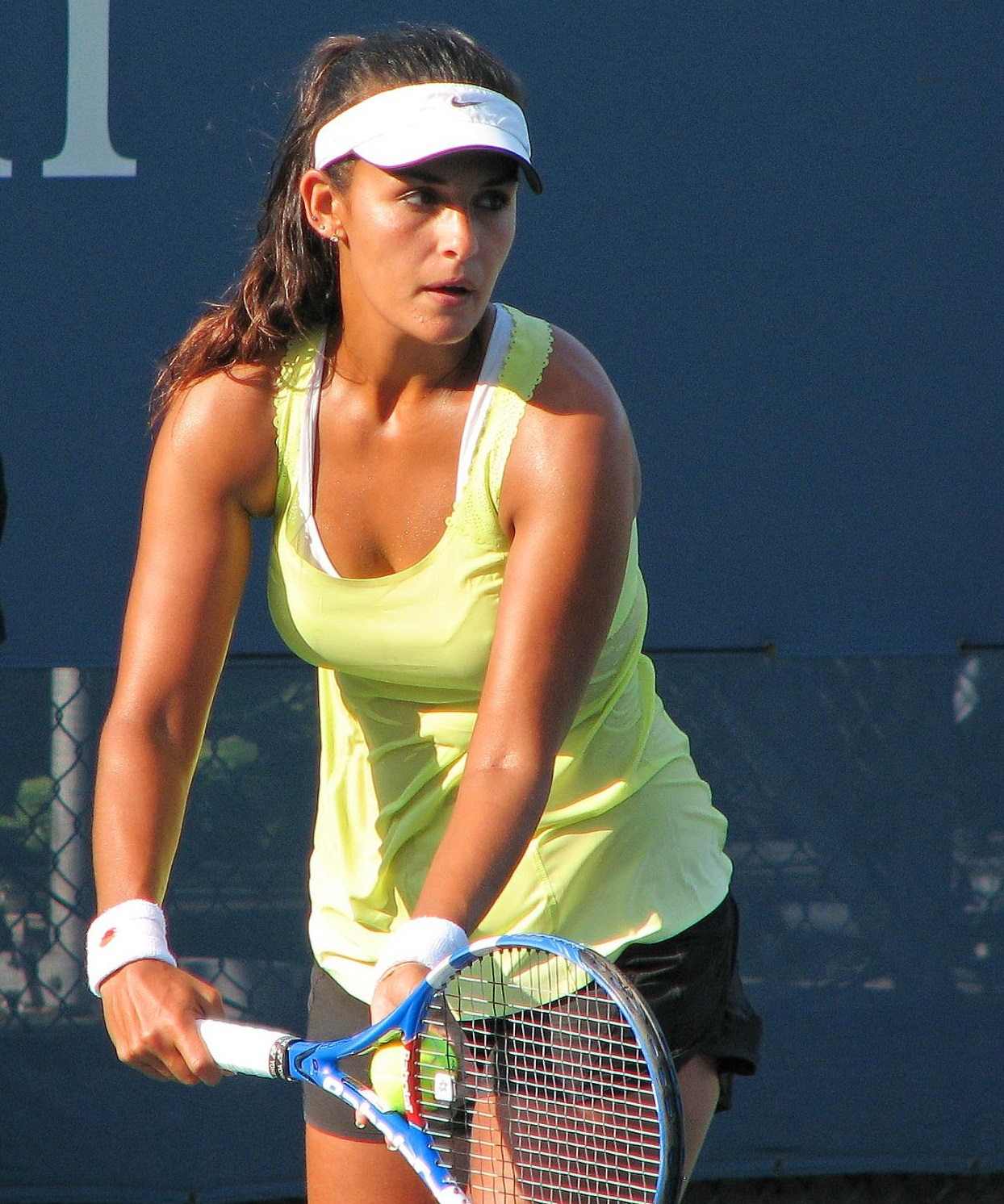
- Heidi El Tabakh in 2011
- Country (sports): Egypt (2002–2005); Canada (2005–present)
- Residence: Toronto, Ontario, Canada
- Born: September 25, 1986 (age 39) Alexandria, Egypt
- Height: 1.80 m (5 ft 11 in)
- Turned pro: 2002
- Retired: April 2016
- Plays: Right-handed (two-handed backhand)
- Prize money: $328,338

Singles
- Career record: 317–291
- Career titles: 7 ITF
- Highest ranking: No. 146 (October 8, 2012)

Grand Slam singles results
- Australian Open: Q2 (2010)
- French Open: 1R (2010, 2012)
- Wimbledon: Q2 (2011, 2012)
- US Open: Q3 (2012)

Doubles
- Career record: 133–136
- Career titles: 10 ITF
- Highest ranking: No. 173 (February 8, 2010)

Heidi El Tabakh (born September 25, 1986) is an Egyptian and Canadian former professional tennis player.

Her highest singles ranking by the WTA is 146, which she reached in October 2012. Her career-high of 173 in doubles, she set in February 2010. She represented Egypt, the country of her birth, from 2002 to April 2005, but since then has represented Canada.

She retired in April 2016 and became Canada's Fed Cup captain in 2019. She won with her team the Billie Jean King Cup in 2023.

== Tennis career ==
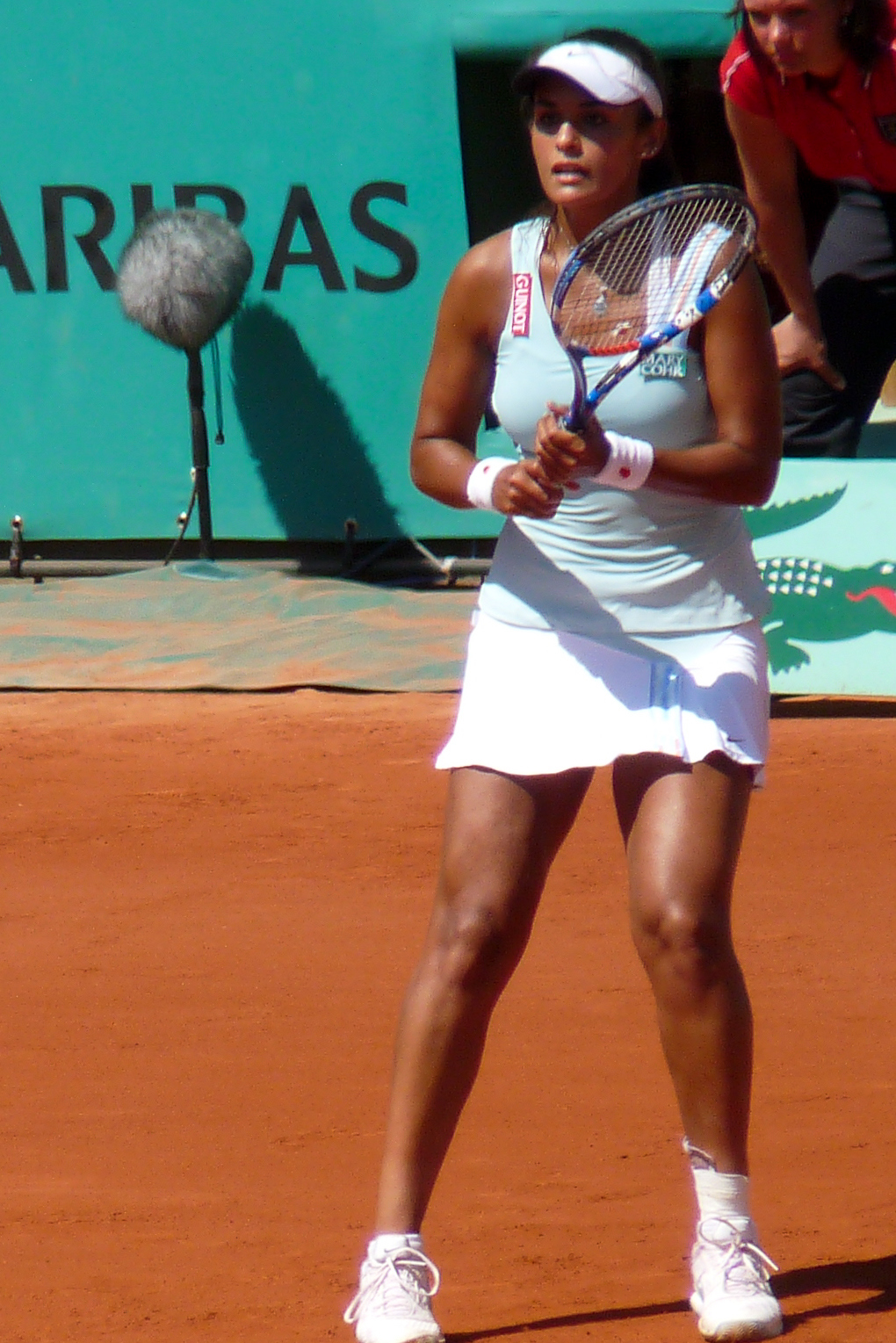
El Tabakh at the 2010 French Open

=== 2002–2016 ===
El Tabakh won one of the biggest singles tournaments of her career in 2009 at the $25k in Valladolid, Spain. In May 2010, she qualified for her Grand Slam debut at the French Open, where she lost to Aravane Rezaï in the first round.

In April 2012, El Tabakh won the second $25k event of her career at the Challenger in Jackson. She defeated former world No. 14, Elena Bovina, in the final. The week after, she won her second straight and third $25k tournament of her career in Pelham. In May 2012, El Tabakh qualified again for the French Open, but lost to fellow Canadian Aleksandra Wozniak in the first round.

In May 2014, she won the fourth $25k title of her career when she defeated Maria Sanchez in Raleigh. In August 2015 at the Rogers Cup, she reached the second round in doubles with fellow Canadian Françoise Abanda. In September 2015 in Redding, El Tabakh captured the seventh singles title of her career, her fifth $25k, by defeating Shérazad Reix in the final.

She played her last match on the professional circuit in April 2016, at the $50k Charlottesville Classic where she had to retire in the first round against Sachia Vickery.

== Grand Slam performance timeline ==
Key
W	F	SF	QF	#R	RR	Q#	DNQ	A	NH

(W) winner; (F) finalist; (SF) semifinalist; (QF) quarterfinalist; (#R) rounds 4, 3, 2, 1; (RR) round-robin stage; (Q#) qualification round; (DNQ) did not qualify; (A) absent; (NH) not held; (SR) strike rate (events won / competed); (W–L) win–loss record.

=== Singles ===
Tournament	2009	2010	2011	2012	2013	2014	2015	2016	W–L
Australian Open	A	Q2	Q1	A	A	A	A	Q1	0–0
French Open	A	1R	Q1	1R	A	A	Q1	A	0–2
Wimbledon	A	Q1	Q2	Q2	A	Q1	A	A	0–0
US Open	Q2	Q2	Q1	Q3	A	Q2	A	A	0–0
Win–loss	0–0	0–1	0–0	0–1	0–0	0–0	0–0	0–0	0–2

== ITF Circuit finals ==
=== Singles: 9 (7 titles, 2 runner-ups) ===
Legend
$25,000 tournaments (5–2)
$10,000 tournaments (2–0)

Result	W–L	Date	Tournament	Tier	Surface	Opponent	Score
Win	1–0	Oct 2003	Lagos Open, Nigeria	10,000	Hard	(India) Sai Jayalakshmy Jayaram	6–4, 6–4
Win	2–0	Sep 2007	ITF Lleida, Spain	10,000	Clay	(Spain) Eva Fernández-Brugués	6–2, 6–3
Loss	2–1	Jun 2009	Waterloo Challenger, Canada	25,000	Clay	(Australia) Johanna Konta	2–6, 6–3, 3–6
Win	3–1	Jul 2009	ITF Valladolid, Spain	25,000	Hard	(Spain) Estrella Cabeza Candela	6–2, 3–6, 6–3
Win	4–1	Apr 2012	ITF Jackson, United States	25,000	Clay	(Russia) Elena Bovina	6–0, 6–4
Win	5–1	Apr 2012	ITF Pelham, United States	25,000	Clay	(Romania) Edina Gallovits-Hall	3–6, 6–2, 6–4
Loss	5–2	Jan 2014	ITF Port St. Lucie, United States	25,000	Clay	(Canada) Françoise Abanda	3–6, 4–6
Win	6–2	May 2014	ITF Raleigh, United States	25,000	Clay	(United States) Maria Sanchez	6–3, 6–4
Win	7–2	Sep 2015	ITF Redding, United States	25,000	Hard	(France) Shérazad Reix	6–1, 6–3

=== Doubles: 19 (10 titles, 9 runner-ups) ===
Legend
$75,000 tournaments (1–0)
$50,000 tournaments (1–2)
$25,000 tournaments (5–5)
$10,000 tournaments (3–2)

Result	W–L	Date	Tournament	Tier	Surface	Partner	Opponents	Score
Loss	0–1	Oct 2003	Lagos Open, Nigeria	10,000	Hard	(Egypt) Yomna Farid	(United Kingdom) Rebecca Dandeniya (South Africa) Michelle Snyman	5–7, 3–6
Win	1–1	Nov 2003	Lagos Open, Nigeria	10,000	Hard	(Egypt) Yomna Farid	(South Africa) Lizaan du Plessis (Egypt) Noha Mohsen	6–1, 5–7, 6–1
Win	2–1	Jun 2004	ITF Edmond, United States	10,000	Hard	(Republic of Ireland) Anne Mall	(South Africa) Kelly Anderson (South Africa) Carine Vermeulen	3–6, 6–3, 6–4
Loss	2–2	Jul 2004	ITF Evansville, United States	10,000	Hard	(United States) Vania King	(United States) Kelly Schmandt (United States) Aleke Tsoubanos	4–6, 4–6
Loss	2–3	Nov 2006	Tevlin Challenger, Canada	25,000	Hard (i)	(Romania) Raluca Olaru	(Germany) Angelika Bachmann (Czech Republic) Hana Šromová	4–6, 1–6
Win	3–3	May 2008	ITF Landisville, United States	10,000	Hard	(United States) Audra Cohen	(Switzerland) Stefania Boffa (United Kingdom) Anna Fitzpatrick	6–3, 7–6^{(3)}
Win	4–3	Jul 2008	ITF Valladolid, Spain	25,000	Hard	(United States) Story Tweedie-Yates	(Switzerland) Stefania Boffa (United Kingdom) Anna Fitzpatrick	6–2, 6–4
Win	5–3	Jul 2008	ITF Darmstadt, Germany	25,000	Clay	(Finland) Emma Laine	(Netherlands) Michelle Gerards (Netherlands) Marcella Koek	6–3, 6–4
Loss	5–4	Apr 2009	ITF Osprey, United States	25,000	Clay	(Austria) Melanie Klaffner	(United States) Lindsay Lee-Waters (United States) Story Tweedie-Yates	3–6, 7–6^{(5)}, [10–12]
Win	6–4	May 2009	ITF Indian Harbor Beach, U.S.	50,000	Clay	(Austria) Melanie Klaffner	(Ukraine) Tetiana Luzhanska (United States) Lilia Osterloh	6–3, 3–6, [10–7]
Loss	6–5	Jun 2009	Waterloo Challenger, Canada	25,000	Clay	(Ukraine) Tetiana Luzhanska	(United States) Alexandra Mueller (United States) Allie Will	2–6, 1–6
Win	7–5	Jul 2009	ITF Valladolid, Spain	25,000	Hard	(Spain) Paula Fondevila Castro	(Spain) Estrella Cabeza Candela (Spain) Sara del Barrio Aragón	6–2, 6–4
Win	8–5	Nov 2009	ITF Bayamón, Puerto Rico	25,000	Hard	(United States) Kimberly Couts	(Bolivia) María Fernanda Álvarez (Colombia) Karen Castiblanco	6–3, 6–1
Win	9–5	Aug 2010	Vancouver Open, Canada	75,000	Hard	(Chinese Taipei) Chang Kai-chen	(United States) Irina Falconi (United States) Amanda Fink	3–6, 6–3, [10–4]
Loss	9–6	Sep 2010	Challenger de Saguenay, Canada	50,000	Hard (i)	(Canada) Rebecca Marino	(Argentina) Jorgelina Cravero (France) Stéphanie Foretz Gacon	3–6, 4–6
Loss	9–7	Mar 2011	ITF Clearwater, United States	25,000	Hard	(Russia) Arina Rodionova	(United States) Kimberly Couts (Latvia) Līga Dekmeijere	1–6, 4–6
Loss	9–8	Apr 2011	ITF Pelham, United States	25,000	Clay	(United States) Kimberly Couts	(Latvia) Līga Dekmeijere (Canada) Marie-Ève Pelletier	6–2, 4–6, [10–12]
Loss	9–9	Apr 2011	Hardee's Pro Classic, United States	50,000	Clay	(United States) Alison Riske	(Russia) Valeria Solovieva (Slovakia) Lenka Wienerová	3–6, 4–6
Win	10–9	Jul 2013	Winnipeg Challenger, Canada	25,000	Hard	(United States) Allie Kiick	(United Kingdom) Samantha Murray (United Kingdom) Jade Windley	6–4, 2–6, [10–8]
