= 2011 Australian Open – Men's singles qualifying =

Men's singles qualifying
- 2011 Australian Open

Events
Singles	men	women		boys	girls
Doubles	men	women	mixed	boys	girls
WC Singles	men	women	quad
WC Doubles	men	women	quad
Legends	men	women	mixed

Qualification
Singles	men	women
- Australian Open

The 2011 Australian Open was a tennis tournament featuring six different competitions, and part of the 2011 ATP World Tour, the 2011 WTA Tour, ITF Junior Tour and the NEC Tour, as tournaments for professional, junior and wheelchair players were held. The tournament took place at Melbourne Park in Melbourne, Australia, from 17 January to 30 January, it was the 99th edition of the Australian Open and the first Grand Slam event of 2011. The tournament was played on hard courts and was organised by the International Tennis Federation and Tennis Australia.

== Players ==
=== Seeds ===
1. (Slovenia) Blaž Kavčič (qualified)
2. (Italy) Simone Bolelli (second round)
3. (Bulgaria) Grigor Dimitrov (qualified)
4. (Brazil) João Souza (first round)
5. (Switzerland) Marco Chiudinelli (first round)
6. (United States) Ryan Sweeting (qualified)
7. (Austria) Andreas Haider-Maurer (second round)
8. (Japan) Go Soeda (first round)
9. (Germany) Denis Gremelmayr (qualified)
10. (Netherlands) Jesse Huta Galung (second round)
11. (Luxembourg) Gilles Müller (qualified)
12. (France) Stéphane Robert (qualified)
13. (France) Édouard Roger-Vasselin (first round)
14. (Netherlands) Igor Sijsling (first round)
15. (United States) Donald Young (qualified)
16. (Republic of Ireland) Conor Niland (first round)
17. (Germany) Simon Greul (qualifying round, lucky loser)
18. (France) Nicolas Mahut (qualified)
19. (Austria) Stefan Koubek (second round)
20. (Czech Republic) Jaroslav Pospíšil (qualifying round)
21. (Slovenia) Grega Žemlja (qualified)
22. (Russia) Konstantin Kravchuk (second round)
23. (Kazakhstan) Evgeny Korolev (second round)
24. (Russia) Alexandre Kudryavtsev (first round)
25. (Serbia) Ilija Bozoljac (second round)
26. (Canada) Milos Raonic (qualified)
27. (France) Josselin Ouanna (qualifying round)
28. (France) Marc Gicquel (first round)
29. (Brazil) Rogério Dutra da Silva (qualifying round)
30. (Poland) Jerzy Janowicz (second round)
31. (France) Vincent Millot (qualified)
32. (Czech Republic) Lukáš Rosol (first round)

=== Qualifiers ===
1. (Slovenia) Blaž Kavčič
2. (Italy) Marco Crugnola
3. (Bulgaria) Grigor Dimitrov
4. (Italy) Flavio Cipolla
5. (Canada) Frank Dancevic
6. (United States) Ryan Sweeting
7. (France) Nicolas Mahut
8. (Germany) Simon Stadler
9. (Germany) Denis Gremelmayr
10. (France) Vincent Millot
11. (Luxembourg) Gilles Müller
12. (France) Stéphane Robert
13. (Czech Republic) Jan Hernych
14. (Slovenia) Grega Žemlja
15. (United States) Donald Young
16. (Canada) Milos Raonic

=== Lucky losers ===
1. (Germany) Simon Greul

== Qualifying draw ==
Key

- Q = Qualifier
- WC = Wild card
- LL = Lucky loser
- Alt = Alternate
- ITF = ITF entry
- PR = Protected ranking
- SR = Special ranking
- SE = Special exempt
- JE = Junior exempt
- JR = Junior Accelerator Programme entrant
- CO = College Accelerator Programme entrant
- NG = Next Gen Accelerator Program entrant
- w/o = Walkover
- r = Retired
- d = Defaulted

=== First qualifier ===
First round
1	(Slovenia) Blaž Kavčič	7^{7}	6^{3}	6
WC	(Australia) Benjamin Mitchell	6^{1}	7^{7}	4
(South Africa) Rik de Voest	6	6
PR/Alt	(United States) Michael McClune	3	2
(Australia) Greg Jones	4	6	9
(France) Olivier Patience	6	4	7
(Spain) Guillermo Alcaide	4	4
25	(Serbia) Ilija Bozoljac	6	6

Second round
1	(Slovenia) Blaž Kavčič	7^{7}	0	6
(South Africa) Rik de Voest	6^{3}	6	0
(Australia) Greg Jones	7^{7}	6^{7}	10
25	(Serbia) Ilija Bozoljac	6^{5}	7^{9}	8

Qualifying competition
1	(Slovenia) Blaž Kavčič	6	6
(Australia) Greg Jones	4	4

=== Second qualifier ===
First round
2	(Italy) Simone Bolelli	6	7^{7}
(Czech Republic) Ivo Minář	4	6^{5}
(Finland) Timo Nieminen	4	5
(Italy) Marco Crugnola	6	7
(Chile) Nicolás Massú	6	6
(Canada) Philip Bester	4	4
(Australia) Brydan Klein	4	4
22	(Russia) Konstantin Kravchuk	6	6

Second round
2	(Italy) Simone Bolelli	5	2
(Italy) Marco Crugnola	7	6
(Chile) Nicolás Massú	6	6
22	(Russia) Konstantin Kravchuk	3	2

Qualifying competition
(Italy) Marco Crugnola	6	6
(Chile) Nicolás Massú	1	3

=== Third qualifier ===
First round
3	(Bulgaria) Grigor Dimitrov	6	6
(Italy) Matteo Viola	1	1
(Morocco) Reda El Amrani	7^{7}	6
(Slovakia) Marek Semjan	6^{1}	3
(France) David Guez	6	6^{2}	4
(Netherlands) Thomas Schoorel	1	7^{7}	6
(Ecuador) Giovanni Lapentti	4	0
19	(Austria) Stefan Koubek	6	6

Second round
3	(Bulgaria) Grigor Dimitrov	6	6
(Morocco) Reda El Amrani	3	4
(Netherlands) Thomas Schoorel	7^{7}	6^{3}	6
19	(Austria) Stefan Koubek	6^{4}	7^{7}	2

Qualifying competition
3	(Bulgaria) Grigor Dimitrov	6^{5}	6	6
(Netherlands) Thomas Schoorel	7^{7}	3	1

=== Fourth qualifier ===
First round
4	(Brazil) João Souza	4	7	1
(Italy) Flavio Cipolla	6	5	6
(Germany) Matthias Bachinger	7^{7}	6
WC	(Australia) Chris Guccione	6^{4}	1
(Czech Republic) Dušan Lojda	6	6
(United States) Rajeev Ram	2	4
(Russia) Evgeny Donskoy	3	3
29	(Brazil) Rogério Dutra da Silva	6	6

Second round
(Italy) Flavio Cipolla	7	6
(Germany) Matthias Bachinger	5	1
(Czech Republic) Dušan Lojda	2	6	4
29	(Brazil) Rogério Dutra da Silva	6	2	6

Qualifying competition
(Italy) Flavio Cipolla	4	7	6
29	(Brazil) Rogério Dutra da Silva	6	5	3

=== Fifth qualifier ===
First round
5	(Switzerland) Marco Chiudinelli	6	3	1
(United States) Alex Bogomolov Jr.	4	6	6
(Switzerland) Michael Lammer	3	5
(Brazil) Thiago Alves	6	7
(Romania) Adrian Ungur	2	3
(Canada) Frank Dancevic	6	6
WC	(Brazil) Tiago Fernandes	2	0
23	(Kazakhstan) Evgeny Korolev	6	6

Second round
(United States) Alex Bogomolov Jr.	4	6	6
(Brazil) Thiago Alves	6	3	3
(Canada) Frank Dancevic	7^{7}	6
23	(Kazakhstan) Evgeny Korolev	6^{5}	2

Qualifying competition
(United States) Alex Bogomolov Jr.	4	5
(Canada) Frank Dancevic	6	7

=== Sixth qualifier ===
First round
6	(United States) Ryan Sweeting	6	6
(Serbia) Nikola Ćirić	4	2
(France) Florian Reynet	6	6
WC	(Australia) Sean Berman	4	1
(Italy) Simone Vagnozzi	6	6
(Slovakia) Ivo Klec	2	3
(United States) Alex Kuznetsov	7	7^{7}
32	(Czech Republic) Lukáš Rosol	5	6^{5}

Second round
6	(United States) Ryan Sweeting	6	6
(France) Florian Reynet	2	4
(Italy) Simone Vagnozzi	4	3
(United States) Alex Kuznetsov	6	6

Qualifying competition
6	(United States) Ryan Sweeting	6	7^{7}
(United States) Alex Kuznetsov	1	6^{2}

=== Seventh qualifier ===
First round
7	(Austria) Andreas Haider-Maurer	7^{7}	2	6
(Belgium) Yannick Mertens	6^{4}	6	4
(Denmark) Frederik Nielsen	3	6	6
(Austria) Alexander Peya	6	1	2
(Spain) Guillermo Olaso	7^{7}	3	6
(Japan) Tatsuma Ito	6^{5}	6	2
WC	(Australia) Luke Saville	0	1
18	(France) Nicolas Mahut	6	6

Second round
7	(Austria) Andreas Haider-Maurer	3	0
(Denmark) Frederik Nielsen	6	6
(Spain) Guillermo Olaso	7^{8}	5	3
18	(France) Nicolas Mahut	6^{6}	7	6

Qualifying competition
(Denmark) Frederik Nielsen	5	6	3
18	(France) Nicolas Mahut	7	3	6

=== Eighth qualifier ===
First round
8	(Japan) Go Soeda	6^{7}	4
(Colombia) Robert Farah	7^{9}	6
WC	(Australia) Maverick Banes	1	2
(Germany) Simon Stadler	6	6
(France) Laurent Rochette	6	7
(Australia) Samuel Groth	3	5
PR	(Spain) Arnau Brugués-Davi	6	6
24	(Russia) Alexander Kudryavtsev	3	4

Second round
(Colombia) Robert Farah	2	4
(Germany) Simon Stadler	6	6
(France) Laurent Rochette	1	6^{8}
PR	(Spain) Arnau Brugués-Davi	6	7^{10}

Qualifying competition
(Germany) Simon Stadler	6	6
PR	(Spain) Arnau Brugués-Davi	1	2

=== Ninth qualifier ===
First round
9	(Germany) Denis Gremelmayr	6	3	6
(Romania) Victor Crivoi	2	6	3
(Slovakia) Pavol Červenák	5	2
(Germany) Bastian Knittel	7	6
(Ukraine) Ivan Sergeyev	6	6^{6}	6
(Israel) Amir Weintraub	3	7^{8}	3
(France) Romain Jouan	3	2
17	(Germany) Simon Greul	6	6

Second round
9	(Germany) Denis Gremelmayr	7^{7}	2	6
(Germany) Bastian Knittel	6^{4}	6	4
(Ukraine) Ivan Sergeyev	0^{r}
17	(Germany) Simon Greul	4

Qualifying competition
9	(Germany) Denis Gremelmayr	7	7
17	(Germany) Simon Greul	5	5

=== Tenth qualifier ===
First round
10	(Netherlands) Jesse Huta Galung	6	6
(France) Grégoire Burquier	2	4
(Colombia) Juan Sebastián Cabal	2	0
(Canada) Peter Polansky	6	6
(Germany) Sebastian Rieschick	6	5	4
(Australia) John Millman	3	7	6
(Russia) Andrey Kuznetsov	4	4
31	(France) Vincent Millot	6	6

Second round
10	(Netherlands) Jesse Huta Galung	1	6^{2}
(Canada) Peter Polansky	6	7^{7}
(Australia) John Millman	4	3
31	(France) Vincent Millot	6	6

Qualifying competition
(Canada) Peter Polansky	3	2
31	(France) Vincent Millot	6	6

=== Eleventh qualifier ===
First round
11	(Luxembourg) Gilles Müller	7^{8}	2	6
(Sweden) Nick Lindahl	6^{6}	6	4
(South Africa) Fritz Wolmarans	7^{7}	7^{7}
(France) Augustin Gensse	6^{4}	6^{5}
(Netherlands) Matwé Middelkoop	5	1
(France) Charles-Antoine Brézac	7	6
(Estonia) Jürgen Zopp	3	6^{2}
20	(Czech Republic) Jaroslav Pospíšil	6	7^{7}

Second round
11	(Luxembourg) Gilles Müller	7^{12}	7^{7}
(South Africa) Fritz Wolmarans	6^{10}	6^{5}
(France) Charles-Antoine Brézac	6	2	2
20	(Czech Republic) Jaroslav Pospíšil	4	6	6

Qualifying competition
11	(Luxembourg) Gilles Müller	6	6
20	(Czech Republic) Jaroslav Pospíšil	2	3

=== Twelfth qualifier ===
First round
12	(France) Stéphane Robert	6	6
(Portugal) Leonardo Tavares	4	4
(France) Clément Reix	5	7^{7}	2
(Croatia) Antonio Veić	7	6^{1}	6
PR	(Germany) Dominik Meffert	2	4
(United States) Bobby Reynolds	6	6
(United States) Michael Yani	3	7	4
30	(Poland) Jerzy Janowicz	6	5	6

Second round
12	(France) Stéphane Robert	6	6
(Croatia) Antonio Veić	3	4
(United States) Bobby Reynolds	6	2	13
30	(Poland) Jerzy Janowicz	2	6	11

Qualifying competition
12	(France) Stéphane Robert	6	6
(United States) Bobby Reynolds	4	1

=== Thirteenth qualifier ===
First round
13	(France) Édouard Roger-Vasselin	2	6	8
(Czech Republic) Jan Hernych	6	2	10
(Spain) Roberto Bautista-Agut	2	0^{r}
(Japan) Yuichi Sugita	6	1
(Chile) Paul Capdeville	6	6
(United Kingdom) James Ward	3	4
(Portugal) João Sousa	6	2	3
27	(France) Josselin Ouanna	2	6	6

Second round
(Czech Republic) Jan Hernych	6	6
(Japan) Yuichi Sugita	3	2
(Chile) Paul Capdeville	4	6	13
27	(France) Josselin Ouanna	6	2	15

Qualifying competition
(Czech Republic) Jan Hernych	7^{8}	6
27	(France) Josselin Ouanna	6^{6}	1

=== Fourteenth qualifier ===
First round
14	(Netherlands) Igor Sijsling	4	1
PR	(Thailand) Danai Udomchoke	6	6
(Italy) Matteo Trevisan	6	4	2
(Croatia) Franko Škugor	3	6	6
(United States) Tim Smyczek	6	6^{3}	6
WC	(Australia) James Duckworth	3	7^{7}	2
(Spain) Sergio Gutiérrez-Ferrol	6^{5}	4
21	(Slovenia) Grega Žemlja	7^{7}	6

Second round
PR	(Thailand) Danai Udomchoke	7	6
(Croatia) Franko Škugor	5	0
(United States) Tim Smyczek	1	6^{2}
21	(Slovenia) Grega Žemlja	6	7^{7}

Qualifying competition
PR	(Thailand) Danai Udomchoke	6	4	1
21	(Slovenia) Grega Žemlja	3	6	6

=== Fifteenth qualifier ===
First round
15	(United States) Donald Young	6	6
(Germany) Dieter Kindlmann	3	0
(Italy) Alberto Brizzi	7^{9}	6
(Russia) Alexander Lobkov	6^{7}	1
WC	(Australia) Matt Reid	3	7^{9}	4
(South Africa) Izak van der Merwe	6	6^{7}	6
PR	(Monaco) Jean-René Lisnard	6	7^{7}
28	(France) Marc Gicquel	3	6^{5}

Second round
15	(United States) Donald Young	6	6
(Italy) Alberto Brizzi	3	1
(South Africa) Izak van der Merwe	7	6^{4}	6
PR	(Monaco) Jean-René Lisnard	5	7^{7}	2

Qualifying competition
15	(United States) Donald Young	6	6
(South Africa) Izak van der Merwe	3	1

=== Sixteenth qualifier ===
First round
16	(Republic of Ireland) Conor Niland	6^{5}	6^{6}
(United States) Kevin Kim	7^{7}	7^{8}
(Slovakia) Andrej Martin	6	6
WC	(Australia) James Lemke	1	2
(United States) Ryler DeHeart	0	2
(Croatia) Nikola Mektić	6	6
(Belgium) David Goffin	2	0^{r}
26	(Canada) Milos Raonic	6	0

Second round
(United States) Kevin Kim	6^{1}	6^{4}
(Slovakia) Andrej Martin	7^{7}	7^{7}
(Croatia) Nikola Mektić	4	1
26	(Canada) Milos Raonic	6	6

Qualifying competition
(Slovakia) Andrej Martin	6	6^{0}	2
26	(Canada) Milos Raonic	4	7^{7}	6
