= 2011 Australian Open – Women's singles qualifying =

Women's singles qualifying
- 2011 Australian Open

Events
Singles	men	women		boys	girls
Doubles	men	women	mixed	boys	girls
WC Singles	men	women	quad
WC Doubles	men	women	quad
Legends	men	women	mixed

Qualification
Singles	men	women
- Australian Open

The 2011 Australian Open was a tennis tournament featuring six different competitions, and part of the 2011 ATP World Tour, the 2011 WTA Tour, ITF Junior Tour and the NEC Tour, as tournaments for professional, junior and wheelchair players were held. The tournament took place at Melbourne Park in Melbourne, Australia, from 17 January to 30 January, it was the 99th edition of the Australian Open and the first Grand Slam event of 2011. The tournament was played on hard courts and was organised by the International Tennis Federation and Tennis Australia.

== Players ==
=== Seeds ===
1. (United States) Coco Vandeweghe (qualified)
2. (United Kingdom) Anne Keothavong (qualified)
3. (Chinese Taipei) Chan Yung-jan (qualifying round)
4. (Slovakia) Zuzana Kučová (qualifying round)
5. (Belarus) Anastasiya Yakimova (first round)
6. (France) Olivia Sanchez (first round)
7. (Russia) Anastasia Pivovarova (qualifying round)
8. (Colombia) Mariana Duque Mariño (first round)
9. (Spain) Nuria Llagostera Vives (qualifying round)
10. (Japan) Kurumi Nara (qualifying round)
11. (China) Han Xinyun (first round)
12. (Georgia (country)) Anna Tatishvili (second round)
13. (Japan) Misaki Doi (second round, Retired)
14. (United States) Jamie Hampton (qualified)
15. (Switzerland) Stefanie Vögele (first round)
16. (Luxembourg) Mandy Minella (second round)
17. (Germany) Tatjana Malek (first round)
18. (Netherlands) Arantxa Rus (qualified)
19. (Croatia) Petra Martić (qualified)
20. (Slovenia) Maša Zec Peškirič (first round)
21. (Czech Republic) Petra Cetkovská (first round)
22. (Netherlands) Michaëlla Krajicek (first round)
23. (Russia) Nina Bratchikova (first round)
24. (India) Sania Mirza (qualified)

=== Qualifiers ===
1. (United States) Coco Vandeweghe
2. (United Kingdom) Anne Keothavong
3. (Russia) Vesna Manasieva
4. (Russia) Arina Rodionova
5. (India) Sania Mirza
6. (United States) Irina Falconi
7. (Luxembourg) Anne Kremer
8. (United States) Jamie Hampton
9. (Croatia) Petra Martić
10. (Netherlands) Arantxa Rus
11. (Germany) Kathrin Wörle
12. (Ukraine) Lesya Tsurenko

== Qualifying draw ==
Key

- Q = Qualifier
- WC = Wild card
- LL = Lucky loser
- Alt = Alternate
- ITF = ITF entry
- PR = Protected ranking
- SR = Special ranking
- SE = Special exempt
- JE = Junior exempt
- JR = Junior Accelerator Programme entrant
- CO = College Accelerator Programme entrant
- NG = Next Gen Accelerator Program entrant
- w/o = Walkover
- r = Retired
- d = Defaulted

=== First qualifier ===
First round
1	(United States) Coco Vandeweghe	7	6
PR	(Japan) Aiko Nakamura	5	3
(Ukraine) Olga Savchuk	1	6	6
WC	(Russia) Irina Khromacheva	6	3	1
(Kazakhstan) Sesil Karatantcheva	6	6
WC	(Australia) Monika Wejnert	3	0
(Japan) Ryoko Fuda	2	4
13	(Japan) Misaki Doi	6	6

Second round
1	(United States) Coco Vandeweghe	6	6
(Ukraine) Olga Savchuk	2	2
(Kazakhstan) Sesil Karatantcheva	6	6^{3}	2
13	(Japan) Misaki Doi	3	7	0r

Qualifying competition
1	(United States) Coco Vandeweghe	6	6
(Kazakhstan) Sesil Karatantcheva	4	2

=== Second qualifier ===
First round
2	(United Kingdom) Anne Keothavong	6	6
(Belarus) Darya Kustova	1	2
(South Korea) Lee Jin-a	0	3
(Romania) Ioana Raluca Olaru	6	6
WC	(Australia) Tammi Patterson	0	6	1
(Romania) Irina-Camelia Begu	6	1	6
(Czech Republic) Eva Birnerová	7	6
17	(Germany) Tatjana Malek	5	2

Second round
2	(United Kingdom) Anne Keothavong	6	6
(Romania) Ioana Raluca Olaru	4	2
(Romania) Irina-Camelia Begu	2	6	6
(Czech Republic) Eva Birnerová	6	2	3

Qualifying competition
2	(United Kingdom) Anne Keothavong	6	6
(Romania) Irina-Camelia Begu	3	4

=== Third qualifier ===
First round
3	(Chinese Taipei) Chan Yung-jan	6	6
(France) Stéphanie Foretz Gacon	4	3
(Japan) Erika Sema	6	3	6
(Czech Republic) Kristýna Plíšková	4	6	3
(Thailand) Nudnida Luangnam	2	2
(Russia) Vesna Manasieva	6	6
(Germany) Sabine Lisicki	7	6
22	(Netherlands) Michaëlla Krajicek	6^{2}	3

Second round
3	(Chinese Taipei) Chan Yung-jan	6	6
(Japan) Erika Sema	3	2
(Russia) Vesna Manasieva	7	6
(Germany) Sabine Lisicki	6^{5}	4

Qualifying competition
3	(Chinese Taipei) Chan Yung-jan	0	2
(Russia) Vesna Manasieva	6	6

=== Fourth qualifier ===
First round
4	(Slovakia) Zuzana Kučová	6	6
(Japan) Kumiko Iijima	2	3
(Argentina) María Irigoyen	2	2
(Ukraine) Yulia Beygelzimer	6	6
(Greece) Irini Georgatou	4	1
(Russia) Arina Rodionova	6	6
(United Kingdom) Katie O'Brien	6	5	3
16	(Luxembourg) Mandy Minella	3	7	6

Second round
4	(Slovakia) Zuzana Kučová	6	6
(Ukraine) Yulia Beygelzimer	1	1
(Russia) Arina Rodionova	6	6
16	(Luxembourg) Mandy Minella	1	1

Qualifying competition
4	(Slovakia) Zuzana Kučová	3	6	4
(Russia) Arina Rodionova	6	4	6

=== Fifth qualifier ===
First round
5	(Belarus) Anastasiya Yakimova	4	2
(Canada) Stéphanie Dubois	6	6
WC	(Australia) Sophie Letcher	6	3	8
(France) Séverine Beltrame	3	6	6
WC	(Australia) Viktorija Rajicic	6	3	1
(Russia) Vitalia Diatchenko	2	6	6
(Belarus) Iryna Kuryanovich	4	2
24	(India) Sania Mirza	6	6

Second round
(Canada) Stéphanie Dubois	6	6
WC	(Australia) Sophie Letcher	1	4
(Russia) Vitalia Diatchenko	4	7	3
24	(India) Sania Mirza	6	6^{7}	6

Qualifying competition
(Canada) Stéphanie Dubois	2	3
24	(India) Sania Mirza	6	6

=== Sixth qualifier ===
First round
6	(France) Olivia Sanchez	4	1
(Kazakhstan) Zarina Diyas	6	6
(Italy) Anna Floris	6	6
(France) Anaïs Laurendon	1	4
(Georgia (country)) Oksana Kalashnikova	6	6^{2}	6
(Russia) Ekaterina Bychkova	4	7	2
(United States) Irina Falconi	6	6
20	(Slovenia) Maša Zec Peškirič	0	1

Second round
(Kazakhstan) Zarina Diyas	6	6
(Italy) Anna Floris	2	3
(Georgia (country)) Oksana Kalashnikova	0	6	5
(United States) Irina Falconi	6	4	7

Qualifying competition
(Kazakhstan) Zarina Diyas	6^{6}	3
(United States) Irina Falconi	7	6

=== Seventh qualifier ===
First round
7	(Russia) Anastasia Pivovarova	6	6
WC	(Australia) Ashling Sumner	2	2
(United States) Lauren Albanese	6	5	6
(Romania) Elena Bogdan	3	7	4
(Russia) Elena Bovina	5	2
(Greece) Eleni Daniilidou	7	6
(Luxembourg) Anne Kremer	6	6
23	(Russia) Nina Bratchikova	1	4

Second round
7	(Russia) Anastasia Pivovarova	6	6
(United States) Lauren Albanese	2	4
(Greece) Eleni Daniilidou	2	0
(Luxembourg) Anne Kremer	6	6

Qualifying competition
7	(Russia) Anastasia Pivovarova	6^{3}	3
(Luxembourg) Anne Kremer	7	6

=== Eighth qualifier ===
First round
8	(Colombia) Mariana Duque Mariño	4	4
(Italy) Corinna Dentoni	6	6
(Turkey) Çağla Büyükakçay	4	6	6
(Russia) Alexandra Panova	6	4	3
(Germany) Anna-Lena Grönefeld	6	6
(Czech Republic) Karolína Plíšková	2	4
(France) Stéphanie Cohen-Aloro	2	7	2
14	(United States) Jamie Hampton	6	6^{4}	6

Second round
(Italy) Corinna Dentoni	3	6	9
(Turkey) Çağla Büyükakçay	6	0	7
(Germany) Anna-Lena Grönefeld	4	3
14	(United States) Jamie Hampton	6	6

Qualifying competition
(Italy) Corinna Dentoni	4	2
14	(United States) Jamie Hampton	6	6

=== Ninth qualifier ===
First round
9	(Spain) Nuria Llagostera Vives	6	3	6
(Croatia) Ana Vrljić	3	6	3
(Spain) Silvia Soler Espinosa	1	6	2
(Israel) Julia Glushko	6	4	6
(Croatia) Ajla Tomljanović	6	7
(Argentina) Florencia Molinero	1	6^{1}
(United States) Madison Brengle	3	3
19	(Croatia) Petra Martić	6	6

Second round
9	(Spain) Nuria Llagostera Vives	7	7
(Israel) Julia Glushko	6^{4}	5
(Croatia) Ajla Tomljanović	4	0
19	(Croatia) Petra Martić	6	6

Qualifying competition
9	(Spain) Nuria Llagostera Vives	2	2
19	(Croatia) Petra Martić	6	6

=== Tenth qualifier ===
First round
10	(Japan) Kurumi Nara	6	6
(Russia) Ekaterina Ivanova	2	2
WC	(New Zealand) Marina Erakovic	3	7	6
(France) Irena Pavlovic	6	6^{2}	4
PR	(Australia) Monique Adamczak	2	4
WC	(Australia) Isabella Holland	6	6
(United States) Julia Cohen	3	2
18	(Netherlands) Arantxa Rus	6	6

Second round
10	(Japan) Kurumi Nara	4	6	6
WC	(New Zealand) Marina Erakovic	6	1	3
WC	(Australia) Isabella Holland	2	3
18	(Netherlands) Arantxa Rus	6	6

Qualifying competition
10	(Japan) Kurumi Nara	4	1
18	(Netherlands) Arantxa Rus	6	6

=== Eleventh qualifier ===
First round
11	(China) Han Xinyun	4	6	3
(Romania) Mădălina Gojnea	6	2	6
(United States) Sloane Stephens	7	1	8
(Romania) Liana Ungur	6^{3}	6	6
(Thailand) Noppawan Lertcheewakarn	7	6
(Canada) Heidi El Tabakh	6^{4}	4
(Germany) Kathrin Wörle	6	7
21	(Czech Republic) Petra Cetkovská	4	5

Second round
(Romania) Mădălina Gojnea	6	2	7
(United States) Sloane Stephens	3	6	5
(Thailand) Noppawan Lertcheewakarn	4	2
(Germany) Kathrin Wörle	6	6

Qualifying competition
(Romania) Mădălina Gojnea	3	4
(Germany) Kathrin Wörle	6	6

=== Twelfth qualifier ===
First round
12	(Georgia (country)) Anna Tatishvili	4	6	6
(Poland) Urszula Radwańska	6	2	0
(Ukraine) Mariya Koryttseva	6	6
(France) Laura Thorpe	4	2
Alt	(France) Kristina Mladenovic	2	3
(United Kingdom) Heather Watson	6	6
(Ukraine) Lesia Tsurenko	6	7
15	(Switzerland) Stefanie Vögele	4	6^{3}

Second round
12	(Georgia (country)) Anna Tatishvili	2	3
(Ukraine) Mariya Koryttseva	6	6
(United Kingdom) Heather Watson	5	6^{0}
(Ukraine) Lesia Tsurenko	7	7

Qualifying competition
(Ukraine) Mariya Koryttseva	5	4
(Ukraine) Lesia Tsurenko	7	6
