= An-Sophie Mestach =

Belgian tennis player (born 1994)

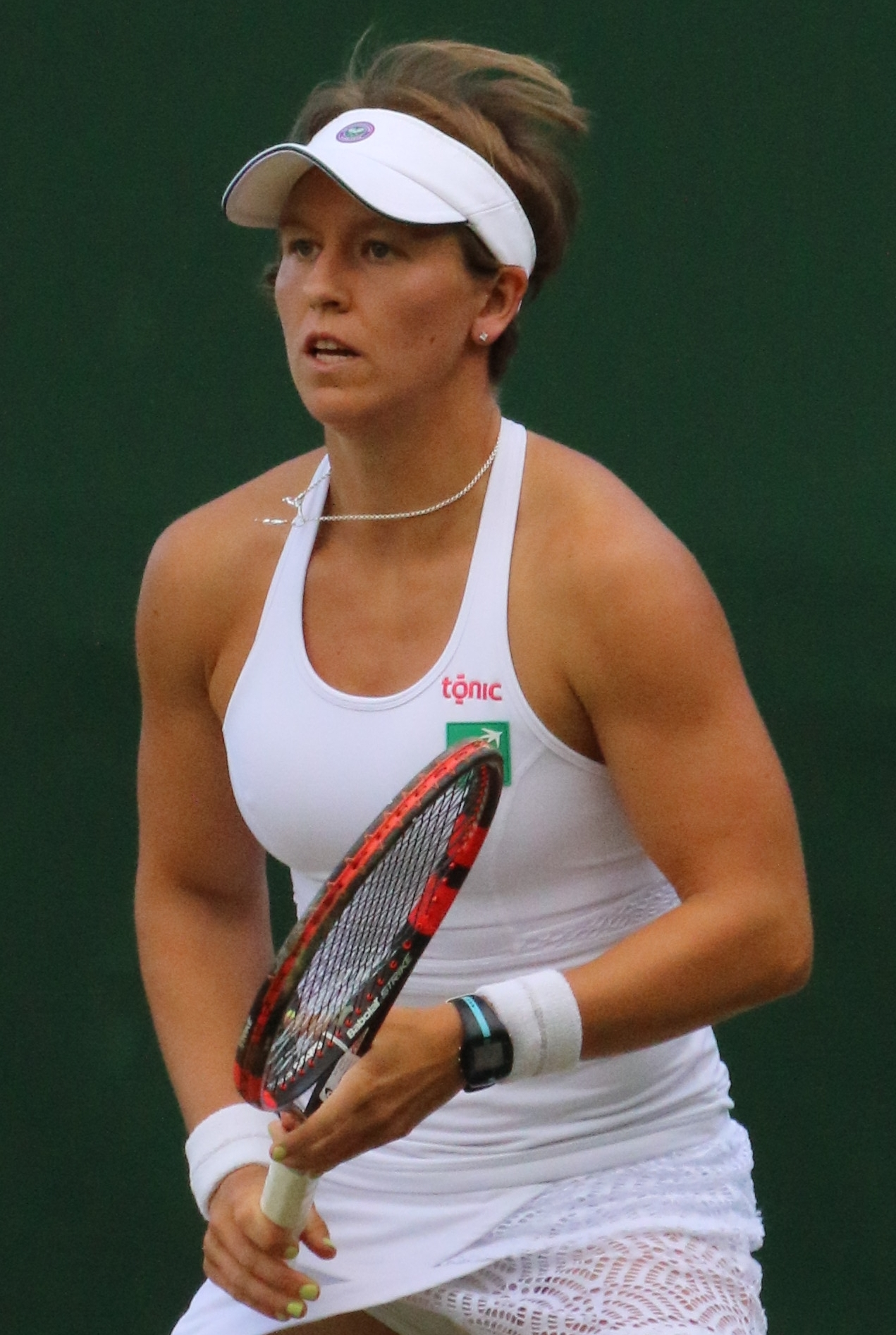
- Mestach at the 2016 Wimbledon Championships
- Country (sports): Belgium
- Born: 7 March 1994 (age 32) Ghent, Belgium
- Height: 1.70 m (5 ft 7 in)
- Turned pro: 2009
- Retired: September 2018
- Prize money: $396,005

Singles
- Career record: 237–162
- Career titles: 6 ITF
- Highest ranking: No. 98 (14 September 2015)

Grand Slam singles results
- Australian Open: 1R (2015)
- French Open: Q1 (2014)
- Wimbledon: Q3 (2013)
- US Open: Q2 (2013, 2015, 2016)

Doubles
- Career record: 131–74
- Career titles: 2 WTA, 8 ITF
- Highest ranking: No. 64 (1 February 2016)

Grand Slam doubles results
- Wimbledon: 1R (2016)

Team competitions
- Fed Cup: 9–6
Medal record
Representing a Mixed-NOCs team
Youth Olympic Games
Bronze medal – third place	2010 Singapore	Girls' doubles

An-Sophie Mestach (born 7 March 1994) is a Belgian former tennis player and padel player. She won two doubles titles on the WTA Tour with six singles and eight doubles titles on the ITF Women's Circuit. She represented Belgium in padel at the 2023 European Games.

== Career ==
Ghent-born Mestach won the junior events of the 2011 Australian Open in both singles and doubles. Following these wins, she became the world No. 1 junior. She also won two Grade-A and three Grade-1 tournaments in singles on the Junior Circuit.

In 2012, Mestach made the final of one ITF event and the semifinals of two others. She ended the year with a ranking of world No. 361.

Playing for the Belgium Fed Cup team since 2010, Mestach has accumulated a win–loss record of 9–6.

Mestach won two doubles titles on the WTA Tour, as well as six singles titles and eight doubles titles on the ITF Women's Circuit. On 14 September 2015, she reached her career-high singles ranking of world No. 98. On 1 February 2016, she peaked at No. 64 in the doubles rankings.

Since retirement, Mestach has pursued a career as a police officer. She has also spent time on the professional padel circuit and in that sport, she represented Belgium at the 2023 European Games, playing the women's doubles with Helena Wyckaert and reached the quarterfinals.

== WTA Tour finals ==
=== Doubles: 3 (2 titles, 1 runner-up) ===
Legend Grand Slam tournaments Premier M & Premier 5 Premier (0–1) International (2–0)	Finals by surface Hard (2–1) Clay (0–0)

Result	Date	Tournament	Tier	Surface	Partner	Opponents	Score
Loss	Feb 2015	Diamond Games, Belgium	Premier	Hard (i)	(Belgium) Alison Van Uytvanck	(Spain) Anabel Medina Garrigues (Spain) Arantxa Parra Santonja	4–6, 6–3, [5–10]
Win	Sep 2015	Tournoi de Québec, Canada	International	Hard (i)	(Czech Republic) Barbora Krejčíková	(Argentina) María Irigoyen (Poland) Paula Kania	4–6, 6–3, [12–10]
Win	Jan 2016	Auckland Open, New Zealand	International	Hard	(Belgium) Elise Mertens	(Montenegro) Danka Kovinić (Czech Republic) Barbora Strýcová	2–6, 6–3, [10–5]

== ITF Circuit finals ==
=== Singles: 17 (6–11) ===
Legend $75,000 tournaments $50,000 tournaments $25,000 tournaments $15,000 tournaments $10,000 tournaments	Finals by surface Hard (5–7) Clay (0–1) Grass (0–2) Carpet (1–1)

Result	No.	Date	Tournament	Surface	Opponent	Score
Loss	1.	16 May 2010	ITF Tortosa, Spain	Clay	(France) Victoria Larrière	5–7, 6–4, 4–6
Loss	2.	7 August 2010	ITF Balikpapan, Indonesia	Hard	(Thailand) Nudnida Luangnam	0–6, 6–3, 2–6
Win	1.	23 September 2012	ITF Antalya, Turkey	Hard	(Japan) Yurina Koshino	6–3, 6–2
Loss	3.	17 March 2013	GB Pro-Series Bath, UK	Hard (i)	(Liechtenstein) Stephanie Vogt	6–7^{(3)}, 3–6
Win	2.	5 May 2013	Kangaroo Cup, Japan	Hard	(China) Wang Qiang	1–6, 6–3, 6–0
Loss	4.	12 May 2013	Fukuoka International, Japan	Carpet	(Tunisia) Ons Jabeur	6–7^{(2)}, 2–6
Loss	5.	19 May 2013	Kurume Cup, Japan	Grass	(Tunisia) Ons Jabeur	0–6, 2–6
Loss	6.	13 October 2013	Open de Touraine, France	Hard (i)	(Croatia) Mirjana Lučić-Baroni	4–6, 2–6
Win	3.	26 January 2014	ITF Sunderland, UK	Hard (i)	(Switzerland) Viktorija Golubic	6–1, 6–4
Win	4.	13 September 2014	Batumi Ladies Open, Georgia	Hard	(Ukraine) Olga Ianchuk	6–2, 6–0
Win	5.	12 October 2014	ITF Monterrey, Mexico	Hard	(Spain) Lourdes Domínguez Lino	6–3, 7–5
Loss	7.	18 October 2014	Abierto Tampico, Mexico	Hard	(Colombia) Mariana Duque	6–3, 1–6, 6–7^{(4)}
Win	6.	23 November 2014	Toyota World Challenge, Japan	Carpet (i)	(Japan) Shuko Aoyama	6–1, 6–1
Loss	8.	19 July 2015	Stockton Challenger, US	Hard	(Japan) Nao Hibino	1–6, 6–7^{(6)}
Loss	9.	26 July 2015	Sacramento Challenger, US	Hard	(Ukraine) Anhelina Kalinina	6–4, 4–6, 3–6
Loss	10.	31 January 2016	Open Andrézieux-Bouthéon, France	Hard (i)	(Switzerland) Stefanie Vögele	1–6, 2–6
Loss	11.	29 May 2016	ITF Karuizawa, Japan	Grass	(Uzbekistan) Nigina Abduraimova	3–6, 5–7

=== Doubles: 19 (8–11) ===
Legend $100,000 tournaments $75,000 tournaments $50/60,000 tournaments $25,000 tournaments $10,000 tournaments	Finals by surface Hard (5–5) Clay (2–2) Grass (1–2) Carpet (0–2)

Outcome	No.	Date	Tournament	Surface	Partner	Opponents	Score
Runner-up	1.	15 May 2009	ITF Antalya, Turkey	Clay	(Belgium) Sofie Oyen	(United Kingdom) Amanda Carreras (Italy) Valentina Sulpizio	6–4, 3–6, [4–10]
Runner-up	2.	1 August 2009	ITF Bree, Belgium	Clay	(Netherlands) Demi Schuurs	(Netherlands) Kiki Bertens (Netherlands) Quirine Lemoine	1–6, 0–6
Winner	1.	13 September 2014	Batumi Ladies Open, Georgia	Hard	(Poland) Sandra Zaniewska	(Bulgaria) Aleksandrina Naydenova (Ukraine) Valeriya Strakhova	6–1, 6–1
Runner-up	3.	2 May 2015	Kangaroo Cup, Japan	Hard	(United Kingdom) Emily Webley-Smith	(China) Wang Yafan (China) Xu Yifan	2–6, 3–6
Runner-up	4.	21 June 2015	Ilkley Trophy, UK	Grass	(Netherlands) Demi Schuurs	(Romania) Raluca Olaru (China) Xu Yifan	3–6, 4–6
Winner	2.	29 January 2016	Open Andrézieux-Bouthéon, France	Hard (i)	(Belgium) Elise Mertens	(Switzerland) Viktorija Golubic (Switzerland) Xenia Knoll	6–4, 3–6, [10–7]
Runner-up	5.	18 June 2016	Ilkley Trophy, UK	Grass	(Australia) Storm Sanders	(China) Yang Zhaoxuan (China) Zhang Kailin	3–6, 6–7^{(5)}
Winner	3.	6 August 2016	Challenger de Granby, Canada	Hard	(United States) Jamie Loeb	(Israel) Julia Glushko (Belarus) Olga Govortsova	6–4, 6–4
Runner-up	6.	14 August 2016	ITF Landisville, US	Hard	(Belgium) Elise Mertens	(United Kingdom) Freya Christie (United Kingdom) Laura Robson	3–6, 4–6
Runner-up	7.	14 October 2016	ITF Équeurdreville, France	Hard (i)	(France) Amandine Hesse	(Sweden) Cornelia Lister (Russia) Polina Monova	5–7, 6–4, [6–10]
Runner-up	8.	12 November 2016	ITF Tokyo Open, Japan	Hard	(United States) Jamie Loeb	(Japan) Rika Fujiwara (Japan) Yuki Naito	4–6, 7–6^{(12)}, [8–10]
Winner	4.	19 May 2017	ITF Båstad, Sweden	Clay	(Belgium) Kimberley Zimmermann	(Belarus) Ilona Kremen (Sweden) Cornelia Lister	4–6, 6–2, [10–5]
Winner	5.	18 June 2017	Manchester Trophy, UK	Grass	(Poland) Magdalena Fręch	(Chinese Taipei) Chang Kai-chen (New Zealand) Marina Erakovic	6–4, 7–6^{(5)}
Winner	6.	23 June 2017	İzmir Cup, Turkey	Hard	(Serbia) Nina Stojanović	(Finland) Emma Laine (Japan) Kotomi Takahata	6–4, 7–5
Winner	7.	17 September 2017	Las Vegas Open, US	Hard	(United Kingdom) Laura Robson	(United States) Sophie Chang (United States) Alexandra Mueller	7–6^{(7)}, 7–6^{(2)}
Runner-up	9.	30 September 2017	ITF Stillwater, US	Hard	(United Kingdom) Harriet Dart	(Serbia) Jovana Jakšić (United States) Caitlin Whoriskey	6–4, 4–6, [3–10]
Runner-up	10.	15 April 2018	ITF Óbidos, Portugal	Carpet	(Serbia) Nina Stojanović	(United Kingdom) Sarah Beth Grey (United Kingdom) Olivia Nicholls	6–4, 6–7^{(4)}, [6–10]
Runner-up	11.	28 April 2018	ITF Óbidos, Portugal	Carpet	(United Kingdom) Freya Christie	(Spain) Estrella Cabeza Candela (Spain) Ángela Fita Boluda	6–7^{(3)}, 6–1, [6–10]
Winner	8.	14 July 2018	Open Contrexéville, France	Clay	(China) Zheng Saisai	(India) Prarthana Thombare (Netherlands) Eva Wacanno	3–6, 6–2, [10–7]

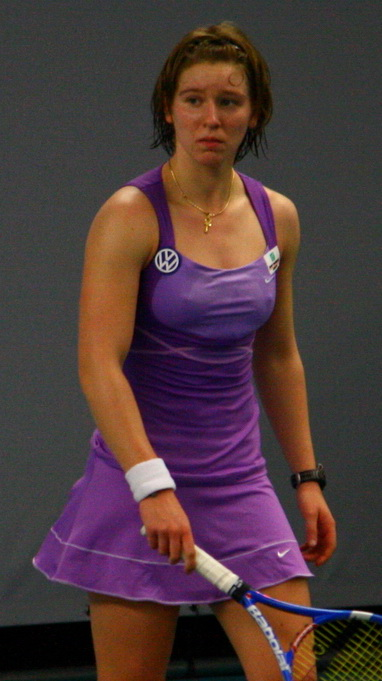
Mestach at the 2010 ITF Torhout

== Junior Circuit ==
=== Grand Slam tournament finals ===
==== Girls' singles ====
Outcome	Year	Championship	Surface	Opponent	Score
Winner	2011	Australian Open	Hard	(Puerto Rico) Monica Puig	6–4, 6–2

==== Girls' doubles ====
Outcome	Year	Championship	Surface	Partner	Opponents	Score
Runner-up	2010	US Open	Hard	(Croatia) Silvia Njirić	(Hungary) Tímea Babos (United States) Sloane Stephens	w/o
Winner	2011	Australian Open	Hard	(Netherlands) Demi Schuurs	(Japan) Eri Hozumi (Japan) Miyu Kato	6–2, 6–3
