= Karuê Sell =

Brazilian tennis player (born 1993)

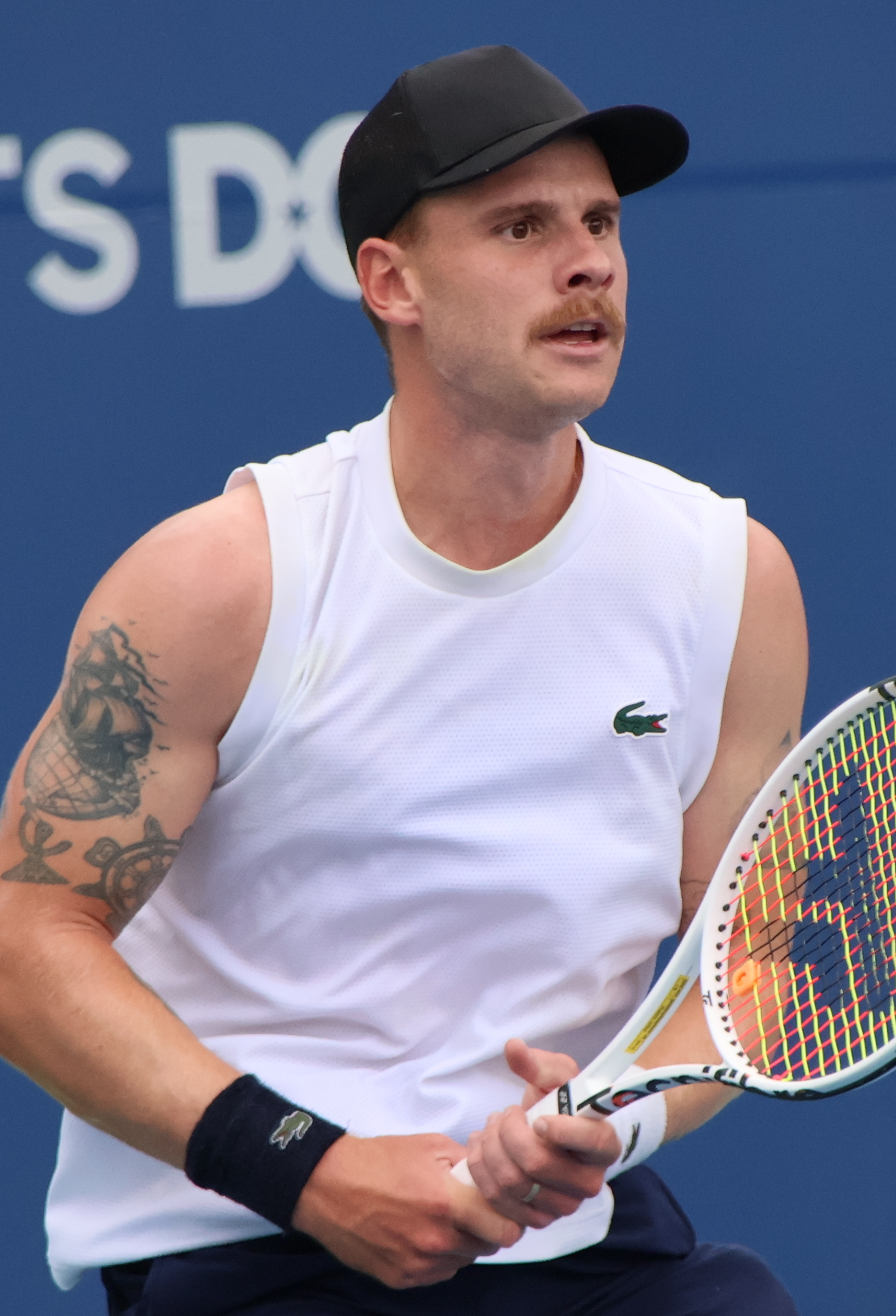
- Sell at the 2025 Washington Open
- Country (sports): Brazil
- Residence: Torrance, California, US
- Born: 13 November 1993 (age 32) Jaraguá do Sul, Brazil
- Height: 1.83 m (6 ft 0 in)
- Turned pro: 2011
- Plays: Right-handed (two-handed backhand)
- College: UCLA
- Prize money: US $110,172

Singles
- Career record: 0–1
- Career titles: 0
- Highest ranking: No. 258 (18 November 2024)
- Current ranking: No. 280 (28 July 2025)

Grand Slam singles results
- Australian Open Junior: 1R (2011)
- French Open Junior: 1R (2010)
- Wimbledon Junior: N/A
- US Open Junior: 2R (2010)

Doubles
- Career record: 0–0
- Career titles: 0
- Highest ranking: No. 581 (24 December 2018)
- Current ranking: No. 1365 (28 July 2025)

Grand Slam doubles results
- Australian Open Junior: SF (2011)
- French Open Junior: 1R (2010)
- Wimbledon Junior: N/A
- US Open Junior: QF (2010)
- Last updated on: 5 August 2026.

Karuê Wiele Sell (born 13 November 1993) is a Brazilian professional tennis player, YouTube content creator and former tennis coach. He has a career-high ATP singles ranking of world No. 258, achieved on 18 November 2024 and a doubles ranking of No. 581, achieved on 24 December 2018.

== Personal life ==
Sell is a YouTuber whose eponymous YouTube channel, formerly known as MyTennisHQ, has more than 179,000 subscribers as of September 2025. The channel began as an online tennis academy, before pivoting to focus on Karuê's YouTube series: Turning Pro at 30. With this change, Sell announced that he would rebrand his channel from MyTennisHQ to just Karuê Sell on 25 July 2023.

He moved from his native Brazil to the US aged 18 to attend college at UCLA, graduating with a Bachelor of Science in Geography.

In 2019, Sell played a pro beach tennis event in Hermosa Beach alongside Kevin Michael Schmitz.

Sell lives with his wife and their two dogs in Torrance, California.

== Junior career ==
Sell competed on the juniors professional tour, reaching a career-high ranking of world No. 33 and playing in all Grand Slams except Wimbledon. He won the first junior tournament he entered in October 2009 at Porto Seguro. He won his second singles title in March 2010 at a tournament held in Montevideo. Sell reached the semifinals of the 2011 Australian Open doubles draw. He competed in his last junior tournament at US Open qualifying that same year.

== College and coaching career ==
Sell played college tennis at UCLA. He subsequently coached the men's tennis team at Pepperdine University for a year, before playing on the ITF Men's Circuit. Following college tennis and collegiate coaching, Sell returned to competition in 2017, before retiring in 2019 to join Naomi Ōsaka's team where he worked as Ōsaka's hitting partner for close to two years. In 2021, Sell later returned to coach at UCLA. In 2023 he started coaching ATP tennis pro Marcos Giron (with whom he had previously played on the UCLA team).

== Professional career ==
In May 2011, while still a junior, Sell won his first pro doubles title at a Futures event in Teresina.

In 2023, while working at UCLA and coaching Marcos Giron, Sell won three UTR Pro Tennis Tour tournaments. Sell turned pro with the aim of entering tournaments as an on-site alternate whilst traveling with Giron. Sell continued to travel and build his world ranking after departing Giron's team, mainly competing in ITF and ATP Challenger Tour events. Sell made his ATP main draw debut at the 2025 Geneva Open after qualifying for the singles main draw.

== ITF Futures/World Tennis Tour finals ==
=== Singles: 8 (6 titles, 2 runner-ups) ===
Legend ITF Futures/WTT (6–2)	Finals by surface Hard (5–2) Clay (1–0)

Result	W–L	Date	Tournament	Tier	Surface	Opponent	Score
Win	1–0	Sep 2017	US F30, Claremont	Futures	Hard	(United States) Martin Redlicki	6–7^{(4–7)}, 6–4, 6–3
Win	2–0	Jan 2018	US F1, Los Angeles	Futures	Hard	(United States) Christopher Eubanks	6–7^{(5–7)}, 6–2, 6–2
Win	3–0	Apr 2018	US F10, Little Rock	Futures	Hard	(South Africa) Nicolaas Scholtz	7–5, 6–2
Loss	3–1	Feb 2019	M15 Tucson, US	WTT	Hard	(United States) Martin Redlicki	4–6, 4–6
Win	4–1	Oct 2023	M15 Morelia, Mexico	WTT	Hard	(Colombia) Johan Alexander Rodríguez	7–5, 6–2
Win	5–1	Jan 2024	M25 Ithaca, US	WTT	Hard (i)	(United States) Tristan McCormick	6–3, 3–0 ret.
Loss	5–2	May 2024	M15 San Diego, US	WTT	Hard	(United States) Learner Tien	7–6^{(8–6)}, 2–6, 2–6
Win	6–2	Aug 2024	M25 Londrina, Brazil	WTT	Clay	(Brazil) José Pereira	6–4, 6–4

=== Doubles: 6 (4 titles, 2 runner-ups) ===
Legend ITF Futures/WTT (4–2)	Finals by surface Hard (3–2) Clay (1–0)

Result	W–L	Date	Tournament	Tier	Surface	Partner	Opponents	Score
Win	1–0	May 2011	Brazil F12, Teresina	Futures	Clay	(Brazil) Bruno Sant'Anna	(Chile) Rodrigo Pérez (Chile) Juan Carlos Sáez	6–2, 6–7^{(3–7)}, [10–7]
Win	2–0	Sep 2017	US F30, Claremont	Futures	Hard	(United States) Deiton Baughman	(United States) Evan Song (Zimbabwe) Benjamin Lock	6–4, 7–5
Loss	2–1	Sep 2017	US F32, Fountain Valley	Futures	Hard	(United States) Martin Redlicki	(United States) Elliott Orkin (United States) Ronnie Schneider	walkover
Win	3–1	Jan 2018	US F1, Los Angeles	Futures	Hard	(United States) Martin Redlicki	(United Kingdom) Luke Bambridge (Mexico) Hans Hach Verdugo	6–4, 6–3
Win	4–1	Feb 2019	M15 Tucson, US	WTT	Hard	(United States) Martin Redlicki	(Republic of Ireland) Julian Bradley (United States) Strong Kirchheimer	6–4, 6–1
Loss	4–2	Mar 2019	M15 Cancún, Mexico	WTT	Hard	(Brazil) Mateus Alves	(Guatemala) Wilfredo González (Dominican Republic) José Olivares	2–6, 7–6^{(7–3)}, [8–10]
