= 2011 Australian Open – Boys' doubles =

Boys' doubles
- 2011 Australian Open

Final
- Champions: (Slovakia) Filip Horanský (Czech Republic) Jiří Veselý
- Runners-up: (Australia) Ben Wagland (Australia) Andrew Whittington
- Score: 6–4, 6–4

Events
Singles	men	women		boys	girls
Doubles	men	women	mixed	boys	girls
WC Singles	men	women	quad
WC Doubles	men	women	quad
Legends	men	women	mixed
- Australian Open

Dutch players Justin Eleveld and Jannick Lupescu chose to not defend their 2010 title, when they defeated Kevin Krawietz and Dominik Schulz in the final.
Filip Horanský and Jiří Veselý won this year's title, by defeating Ben Wagland and Andrew Whittington 6–4, 6–4 in the final match.

== Seeds ==
1. (United Kingdom) George Morgan / (Croatia) Mate Pavić (third round)
2. (Slovakia) Filip Horanský / (Czech Republic) Jiří Veselý (champions)
3. (Australia) Ben Wagland / (Australia) Andrew Whittington (final)
4. (Belgium) Joris De Loore / (Croatia) Mate Delić (semifinals)
5. (Switzerland) Dimitri Bretting / (Austria) Dennis Novak (first round)
6. (Austria) Dominic Thiem / (Germany) Matthias Wunner (third round)
7. (Mexico) Luis Patiño / (Canada) Filip Peliwo (first round)
8. (United States) Mitchell Krueger / (Brazil) Karue Sell (semifinals)

== Draw ==
Key

- Q = Qualifier
- WC = Wild card
- LL = Lucky loser
- Alt = Alternate
- ITF = ITF entry
- PR = Protected ranking
- SR = Special ranking
- SE = Special exempt
- JE = Junior exempt
- JR = Junior Accelerator Programme entrant
- CO = College Accelerator Programme entrant
- NG = Next Gen Accelerator Program entrant
- w/o = Walkover
- r = Retired
- d = Defaulted

=== Finals ===
Semifinals
8	(United States) Mitchell Krueger (Brazil) Karue Sell	7	2	[9]
3	(Australia) Ben Wagland (Australia) Andrew Whittington	6^{5}	6	[11]
4	(Belgium) Joris De Loore (Croatia) Mate Delić	6^{4}	4
2	(Slovakia) Filip Horanský (Czech Republic) Jiří Veselý	7	6

Final
3	(Australia) Ben Wagland (Australia) Andrew Whittington	4	4
2	(Slovakia) Filip Horanský (Czech Republic) Jiří Veselý	6	6

=== Top half ===
First round
1	(United Kingdom) George Morgan (Croatia) Mate Pavić	4	6	[10]
(Slovakia) Adrian Partl (Ukraine) Leonard Stakhovsky	6	4	[6]
(United Kingdom) Kyle Edmund (Sweden) Stefan Lindmark	6	6
(Brazil) Thiago Monteiro (Brazil) Bruno Sant'anna	3	3
WC	(Australia) Christopher O'Connell (Australia) Jordan Thompson	7	6
(Australia) Thanasi Kokkinakis (Chinese Taipei) Wang Chieh-fu	6 ^{5}	4
(Spain) Axel Álvarez Llamas (Spain) Roberto Carballés	0	6	[3]
8	(United States) Mitchell Krueger (Brazil) Karue Sell	6	4	[10]
3	(Australia) Ben Wagland (Australia) Andrew Whittington	6^{3}	6	[10]
(Canada) Andrew Ochotta (Slovenia) Nik Razboršek	7	3	[8]
(Japan) Ryota Kishi (Serbia) Nikola Milojević	3	3
(New Zealand) Jaden Grinter (Philippines) Jeson Patrombon	6	6
(Russia) Evgeny Karlovskiy (Russia) Vladimir Polyakov	6	5	[10]
(Moldova) Maxim Dubarenco (Belarus) Yaraslav Shyla	1	7	[6]
WC	(Australia) Andrew Harris (Australia) Nick Kyrgios	6	7
5	(Switzerland) Dimitri Bretting (Austria) Dennis Novak	3	6^{3}

Second round
1	(United Kingdom) G Morgan (Croatia) M Pavić	6	6
(United Kingdom) K Edmund (Sweden) S Lindmark	4	2
(Australia) C O'Connell (Australia) J Thompson	4	0
8	(United States) M Krueger (Brazil) K Sell	6	6
3	(Australia) B Wagland (Australia) A Whittington	6	7
(New Zealand) J Grinter (Philippines) J Patrombon	3	5
(Russia) E Karlovskiy (Russia) V Polyakov	6	6
WC	(Australia) A Harris (Australia) N Kyrgios	3	3

Quarterfinals
1	(United Kingdom) G Morgan (Croatia) M Pavić	7	1	[8]
8	(United States) M Krueger (Brazil) K Sell	6^{3}	6	[10]
3	(Australia) B Wagland (Australia) A Whittington	4	6	[10]
(Russia) E Karlovskiy (Russia) V Polyakov	6	4	[4]

Semifinals
8	(United States) M Krueger (Brazil) K Sell	7	2	[9]
3	(Australia) B Wagland (Australia) A Whittington	6^{5}	6	[11]

=== Bottom half ===
First round
7	(Mexico) Luis Patiño (Canada) Filip Peliwo	5	1
(France) Laurent Lokoli (France) Lucas Pouille	7	6
(Australia) Luke Saville (Australia) Jack Schipanski	6^{4}	7	[8]
(Germany) Patrick Elias (United States) Dennis Novikov	7	6^{7}	[10]
WC	(Australia) Alex Bolt (Australia) Mark Richards	6	6
(Germany) Constantin Christ (Austria) Patrick Ofner	1	4
(Egypt) Karim Hossam (Serbia) Miki Janković	3	3
4	(Belgium) Joris De Loore (Croatia) Mate Delić	6	6
6	(Austria) Dominic Thiem (Germany) Matthias Wunner	6	6
(Germany) Robin Kern (Germany) Julian Lenz	1	4
(Czech Republic) Adam Pavlásek (Czech Republic) Lukáš Vrňák	2	6	10
(Romania) Darius Florin Brăguși (Romania) Vasile-Alexandru Ghilea	6	2	8
(China) Gao Xin (South Korea) Kim Jae-hwan	6	6^{4}	10
WC	(Australia) Joey Swaysland (Australia) Todd Volmari	1	7	5
(Spain) Andrés Artuñedo (Spain) Oriol Roca Batalla	0	7	[8]
2	(Slovakia) Filip Horanský (Czech Republic) Jiří Veselý	6	5	[10]

Second round
(France) L Lokoli (France) L Pouille	6	6
(Germany) P Elias (United States) D Novikov	3	4
WC	(Australia) A Bolt (Australia) M Richards	4	4
4	(Belgium) J De Loore (Croatia) M Delić	6	6
6	(Austria) D Thiem (Germany) M Wunner	6	6
(Czech Republic) A Pavlásek (Czech Republic) L Vrňák	0	4
(China) X Gao (South Korea) J-h Kim	4	2
2	(Slovakia) F Horanský (Czech Republic) J Veselý	6	6

Quarterfinals
(France) L Lokoli (France) L Pouille	w/o
4	(Belgium) J De Loore (Croatia) M Delić
6	(Austria) D Thiem (Germany) M Wunner	2	4
2	(Slovakia) F Horanský (Czech Republic) J Veselý	6	6

Semifinals
4	(Belgium) J De Loore (Croatia) M Delić	6^{4}	4
2	(Slovakia) F Horanský (Czech Republic) J Veselý	7	6
