= 2011 Australian Open – Women's doubles =

Women's doubles
- 2011 Australian Open

Final
- Champion: (Argentina) Gisela Dulko (Italy) Flavia Pennetta
- Runner-up: (Belarus) Victoria Azarenka (Russia) Maria Kirilenko
- Score: 2–6, 7–5, 6–1

Details
- Draw: 64
- Seeds: 16

Events
Singles	men	women		boys	girls
Doubles	men	women	mixed	boys	girls
WC Singles	men	women	quad
WC Doubles	men	women	quad
Legends	men	women	mixed
- Australian Open

Serena Williams and Venus Williams were the defending champions from 2010; however, they were unable to defend their title because of Serena's foot injury, sustained in the middle of the 2010 season.

Gisela Dulko and Flavia Pennetta won the title beating Victoria Azarenka and Maria Kirilenko 2–6, 7–5, 6–1 in the final. This was to be Dulko and Pennetta's only Grand Slam doubles title.

== Seeds ==
1. (Argentina) Gisela Dulko / (Italy) Flavia Pennetta (champions)
2. (Czech Republic) Květa Peschke / (Slovenia) Katarina Srebotnik (semifinals)
3. (United States) Liezel Huber / (Russia) Nadia Petrova (semifinals)
4. (Spain) Nuria Llagostera Vives / (Spain) María José Martínez Sánchez (second round)
5. (Zimbabwe) Cara Black / (Australia) Anastasia Rodionova (quarterfinals)
6. (Czech Republic) Iveta Benešová / (Czech Republic) Barbora Záhlavová-Strýcová (third round)
7. (Germany) Julia Görges / (United States) Lisa Raymond (third round)
8. (Chinese Taipei) Chan Yung-jan / (Poland) Agnieszka Radwańska (third round)
9. (United States) Bethanie Mattek-Sands / (United States) Meghann Shaughnessy (quarterfinals)
10. (Romania) Monica Niculescu / (China) Yan Zi (second round)
11. (Italy) Francesca Schiavone / (Australia) Rennae Stubbs (first round)
12. (Belarus) Victoria Azarenka / (Russia) Maria Kirilenko (final)
13. (Russia) Elena Vesnina / (Russia) Vera Zvonareva (second round)
14. (Israel) Shahar Pe'er / (China) Peng Shuai (third round)
15. (Russia) Alisa Kleybanova / (Spain) Anabel Medina Garrigues (second round)
16. (Switzerland) Timea Bacsinszky / (Italy) Tathiana Garbin (second round)

== Draw ==
Key

- Q = Qualifier
- WC = Wild card
- LL = Lucky loser
- Alt = Alternate
- ITF = ITF entry
- PR = Protected ranking
- SR = Special ranking
- SE = Special exempt
- JE = Junior exempt
- JR = Junior Accelerator Programme entrant
- CO = College Accelerator Programme entrant
- NG = Next Gen Accelerator Program entrant
- w/o = Walkover
- r = Retired
- d = Defaulted

=== Finals ===
Quarterfinals
1	(Argentina) Gisela Dulko (Italy) Flavia Pennetta	6	6
(South Africa) Natalie Grandin (Czech Republic) Vladimíra Uhlířová	0	3
3	(United States) Liezel Huber (Russia) Nadia Petrova	6	6
5	(Zimbabwe) Cara Black (Australia) Anastasia Rodionova	1	4
12	(Belarus) Victoria Azarenka (Russia) Maria Kirilenko	5	6	6
(Chinese Taipei) Chuang Chia-jung (Chinese Taipei) Hsieh Su-wei	7	3	2
9	(United States) Bethanie Mattek-Sands (United States) Meghann Shaughnessy	3	3
2	(Czech Republic) Květa Peschke (Slovenia) Katarina Srebotnik	6	6

Semifinals
1	(Argentina) Gisela Dulko (Italy) Flavia Pennetta	6	7
3	(United States) Liezel Huber (Russia) Nadia Petrova	4	5
12	(Belarus) Victoria Azarenka (Russia) Maria Kirilenko	6	6
2	(Czech Republic) Květa Peschke (Slovenia) Katarina Srebotnik	2	4

Final
1	(Argentina) Gisela Dulko (Italy) Flavia Pennetta	2	7	6
12	(Belarus) Victoria Azarenka (Russia) Maria Kirilenko	6	5	1

=== Top half ===
==== Section 1 ====
First round
1	(Argentina) G Dulko (Italy) F Pennetta	6	6
(India) S Mirza (Czech Republic) R Voráčová	4	1
WC	(Australia) T Patterson (Australia) O Rogowska	4	2
(United States) J Craybas (Ukraine) O Savchuk	6	6
Alt	(Romania) IR Olaru (Czech Republic) Z Ondrášková	1	2
(Belarus) O Govortsova (Russia) A Kudryavtseva	6	6
(Russia) V Dushevina (Russia) E Makarova	3	2
15	(Russia) A Kleybanova (Spain) A Medina Garrigues	6	6
11	(Italy) F Schiavone (Australia) R Stubbs	0	5
(Netherlands) M Krajicek (Czech Republic) P Kvitová	6	7
(France) A Cornet (Romania) E Gallovits-Hall	6^{3}	2
(South Africa) N Grandin (Czech Republic) V Uhlířová	7	6
(Australia) J Groth (Czech Republic) K Zakopalová	6	6
(United States) C Gullickson (United States) M Oudin	1	2
(Russia) V Diatchenko (Belarus) T Poutchek	2	1
7	(Germany) J Görges (United States) L Raymond	6	6

Second round
1	(Argentina) G Dulko (Italy) F Pennetta	6	6
(United States) J Craybas (Ukraine) O Savchuk	2	2
(Belarus) O Govortsova (Russia) A Kudryavtseva	6	6
15	(Russia) A Kleybanova (Spain) A Medina Garrigues	2	4
(Netherlands) M Krajicek (Czech Republic) P Kvitová	0	4
(South Africa) N Grandin (Czech Republic) V Uhlířová	6	6
(Australia) J Groth (Czech Republic) K Zakopalová	6	3	2
7	(Germany) J Görges (United States) L Raymond	4	6	6

Third round
1	(Argentina) G Dulko (Italy) F Pennetta	6	6
(Belarus) O Govortsova (Russia) A Kudryavtseva	3	2
(South Africa) N Grandin (Czech Republic) V Uhlířová	7	3	6
7	(Germany) J Görges (United States) L Raymond	6^{5}	6	4

Quarterfinals
1	(Argentina) G Dulko (Italy) F Pennetta	6	6
(South Africa) N Grandin (Czech Republic) V Uhlířová	0	3

==== Section 2 ====
First round
3	(United States) L Huber (Russia) N Petrova	6	6
WC	(Australia) D Dominikovic (Australia) J Moore	3	0
(Greece) E Daniilidou (Estonia) K Kanepi	6	6
(Spain) L Domínguez Lino (Spain) C Suárez Navarro	1	3
(Romania) A Dulgheru (Slovakia) M Rybáriková	4	6	7
(United States) V King (Spain) A Parra Santonja	6	2	6^{6}
WC	(Australia) J Dokić (Australia) S Peers	1	4
16	(Switzerland) T Bacsinszky (Italy) T Garbin	6	6
10	(Romania) M Niculescu (China) Z Yan	6	6
(Poland) K Jans (Poland) A Rosolska	2	2
(United States) R Kops-Jones (United States) A Spears	6	7
(Slovenia) P Hercog (Croatia) P Martić	3	6^{5}
(United Kingdom) S Borwell (Canada) M-È Pelletier	7	2	2
(Romania) S Cîrstea (Czech Republic) L Šafářová	5	6	6
(Austria) T Paszek (Bulgaria) T Pironkova	2	1
5	(Zimbabwe) C Black (Australia) A Rodionova	6	6

Second round
3	(United States) L Huber (Russia) N Petrova	6	6
(Greece) E Daniilidou (Estonia) K Kanepi	3	3
(Romania) A Dulgheru (Slovakia) M Rybáriková	6	6
16	(Switzerland) T Bacsinszky (Italy) T Garbin	3	3
10	(Romania) M Niculescu (China) Z Yan	6^{4}	7	2
(United States) R Kops-Jones (United States) A Spears	7	5	6
(Romania) S Cîrstea (Czech Republic) L Šafářová	4	5
5	(Zimbabwe) C Black (Australia) A Rodionova	6	7

Third round
3	(United States) L Huber (Russia) N Petrova	6	6
(Romania) A Dulgheru (Slovakia) M Rybáriková	3	2
(United States) R Kops-Jones (United States) A Spears	4	2
5	(Zimbabwe) C Black (Australia) A Rodionova	6	6

Quarterfinals
3	(United States) L Huber (Russia) N Petrova	6	6
5	(Zimbabwe) C Black (Australia) A Rodionova	1	4

=== Bottom half ===
==== Section 3 ====
First round
8	(Chinese Taipei) Y-j Chan (Poland) A Radwańska	4	6	7
(Slovakia) D Cibulková (Russia) A Pavlyuchenkova	6	2	5
(Sweden) S Arvidsson (Sweden) J Larsson	6	6
(Uzbekistan) A Amanmuradova (Belarus) D Kustova	4	3
WC	(Australia) S Ferguson (Australia) A Molik	4	6	6
(Italy) A Brianti (Russia) A Chakvetadze	6	1	3
(Italy) R Oprandi (Germany) J Wöhr	1	0
12	(Belarus) V Azarenka (Russia) M Kirilenko	6	6
13	(Russia) E Vesnina (Russia) V Zvonareva	6	6
WC	(Australia) M Adamczak (Australia) I Holland	1	1
WC	(Australia) J Hopper (Australia) M Wejnert	1	2
(Chinese Taipei) C-j Chuang (Chinese Taipei) S-w Hsieh	6	6
(Germany) K Barrois (Germany) A Kerber	5	3
(Germany) A-L Grönefeld (Switzerland) P Schnyder	7	6
(Italy) S Errani (Italy) R Vinci	7	4	4
4	(Spain) N Llagostera Vives (Spain) MJ Martínez Sánchez	5	6	6

Second round
8	(Chinese Taipei) Y-j Chan (Poland) A Radwańska	6	6
(Sweden) S Arvidsson (Sweden) J Larsson	2	1
WC	(Australia) S Ferguson (Australia) A Molik	2	1
12	(Belarus) V Azarenka (Russia) M Kirilenko	6	6
13	(Russia) E Vesnina (Russia) V Zvonareva	2	2
(Chinese Taipei) C-j Chuang (Chinese Taipei) S-w Hsieh	6	6
(Germany) A-L Grönefeld (Switzerland) P Schnyder	6	6
4	(Spain) N Llagostera Vives (Spain) MJ Martínez Sánchez	4	4

Third round
8	(Chinese Taipei) Y-j Chan (Poland) A Radwańska	2	1
12	(Belarus) V Azarenka (Russia) M Kirilenko	6	6
(Chinese Taipei) C-j Chuang (Chinese Taipei) S-w Hsieh	6	6
(Germany) A-L Grönefeld (Switzerland) P Schnyder	4	2

Quarterfinals
12	(Belarus) V Azarenka (Russia) M Kirilenko	5	6	6
(Chinese Taipei) C-j Chuang (Chinese Taipei) S-w Hsieh	7	3	2

==== Section 4 ====
First round
6	(Czech Republic) I Benešová (Czech Republic) B Záhlavová-Strýcová	6	6
(Ukraine) K Bondarenko (Russia) D Safina	2	4
(Romania) S Halep (Belgium) Y Wickmayer	4	3
(Latvia) L Dekmeijere (Japan) A Morita	6	6
WC	(Australia) S Letcher (Australia) V Rajicic	4	2
(Russia) M Kondratieva (France) S Lefèvre	6	6
(Belgium) K Flipkens (Ukraine) M Koryttseva	1	1
9	(United States) B Mattek-Sands (United States) M Shaughnessy	6	6
14	(Israel) S Pe'er (China) S Peng	6	6
(Germany) T Malek (Germany) A Petkovic	2	3
(Serbia) B Jovanovski (United States) V Lepchenko	4	4
(Japan) K Date-Krumm (China) S Zhang	6	6
(Austria) S Bammer (Latvia) A Sevastova	3	6^{3}
(Czech Republic) A Hlaváčková (Czech Republic) L Hradecká	6	7
(New Zealand) M Erakovic (Thailand) T Tanasugarn	4	5
2	(Czech Republic) K Peschke (Slovenia) K Srebotnik	6	7

Second round
6	(Czech Republic) I Benešová (Czech Republic) B Záhlavová-Strýcová	6	6
(Latvia) L Dekmeijere (Japan) A Morita	3	2
(Russia) M Kondratieva (France) S Lefèvre	2	7	0
9	(United States) B Mattek-Sands (United States) M Shaughnessy	6	6^{4}	6
14	(Israel) S Pe'er (China) S Peng	1	6	6
(Japan) K Date-Krumm (China) S Zhang	6	3	2
(Czech Republic) A Hlaváčková (Czech Republic) L Hradecká	6	5	2
2	(Czech Republic) K Peschke (Slovenia) K Srebotnik	4	7	6

Third round
6	(Czech Republic) I Benešová (Czech Republic) B Záhlavová-Strýcová	5	3
9	(United States) B Mattek-Sands (United States) M Shaughnessy	7	6
14	(Israel) S Pe'er (China) S Peng	2	6^{3}
2	(Czech Republic) K Peschke (Slovenia) K Srebotnik	6	7

Quarterfinals
9	(United States) B Mattek-Sands (United States) M Shaughnessy	3	3
2	(Czech Republic) K Peschke (Slovenia) K Srebotnik	6	6
