= 2011 Australian Open – Girls' singles =

Girls' singles
- 2011 Australian Open

Final
- Champion: (Belgium) An-Sophie Mestach
- Runner-up: (Puerto Rico) Monica Puig
- Score: 6–4, 6–2

Events
Singles	men	women		boys	girls
Doubles	men	women	mixed	boys	girls
WC Singles	men	women	quad
WC Doubles	men	women	quad
Legends	men	women	mixed
- Australian Open

An-Sophie Mestach won the title, defeating Monica Puig in the final, 6–4, 6–2.

Karolína Plíšková was the defending champion, but was no longer eligible to participate in junior events. She competed in the women's singles qualifying competition where she lost to Anna-Lena Grönefeld in the first round.

== Seeds ==
1. (Russia) Daria Gavrilova (first round)
2. (Belgium) An-Sophie Mestach (champion)
3. (United States) Lauren Davis (third round)
4. (Russia) Irina Khromacheva (quarterfinals)
5. (Puerto Rico) Monica Puig (final)
6. (China) Zheng Saisai (third round)
7. (Russia) Yulia Putintseva (third round)
8. (France) Caroline Garcia (semifinals)
9. (Serbia) Natalija Kostić (first round)
10. (China) Tang Haochen (second round)
11. (Montenegro) Danka Kovinić (quarterfinals)
12. (Japan) Miho Kowase (first round)
13. (Belarus) Ilona Kremen (third round)
14. (Canada) Eugenie Bouchard (semifinals)
15. (Ukraine) Ganna Poznikhirenko (first round)
16. (Slovenia) Nastja Kolar (third round)

== Draw ==
Key

- Q = Qualifier
- WC = Wild card
- LL = Lucky loser
- Alt = Alternate
- ITF = ITF entry
- PR = Protected ranking
- SR = Special ranking
- SE = Special exempt
- JE = Junior exempt
- JR = Junior Accelerator Programme entrant
- CO = College Accelerator Programme entrant
- NG = Next Gen Accelerator Program entrant
- w/o = Walkover
- r = Retired
- d = Defaulted

=== Finals ===
Quarterfinals
(United States) Christina Makarova	5	2
5	(Puerto Rico) Monica Puig	7	6
14	(Canada) Eugenie Bouchard	6	6
(Slovakia) Anna Karolína Schmiedlová	2	3
8	(France) Caroline Garcia	6	6
4	(Russia) Irina Khromacheva	1	3
11	(Montenegro) Danka Kovinić	1	3
2	(Belgium) An-Sophie Mestach	6	6

Semifinals
5	(Puerto Rico) Monica Puig	6	6
14	(Canada) Eugenie Bouchard	4	4
8	(France) Caroline Garcia	3	6	4
2	(Belgium) An-Sophie Mestach	6	2	6

Final
5	(Puerto Rico) Monica Puig	4	2
2	(Belgium) An-Sophie Mestach	6	6

=== Top half ===
==== Section 1 ====
First round
1	(Russia) Daria Gavrilova	4	3
Q	(Japan) Kanami Tsuji	6	6
WC	(Australia) Kassandra Dunser	4	3
(United Kingdom) Jennifer Ren	6	6
(South Korea) Lee So-ra	6	6
Q	(Japan) Riko Sawayanagi	1	1
(United States) Christina Makarova	6	6
15	(Ukraine) Ganna Poznikhirenko	2	1
10	(China) Tang Haochen	6	6
Q	(Australia) Teiwa Casey	0	3
(Japan) Emi Mutaguchi	7	6
(India) Rishika Sunkara	5	4
(Czech Republic) Klára Fabíková	3	3
WC	(Australia) Stefani Stojic	6	6
(Belarus) Aliaksandra Sasnovich	1	3
5	(Puerto Rico) Monica Puig	6	6

Second round
Q	(Japan) K Tsuji	6	6^{2}	6
(United Kingdom) J Ren	2	7	3
(South Korea) S-r Lee	6	1	7
(United States) C Makarova	3	6	9
10	(China) H Tang	6	2	2
(Japan) E Mutaguchi	3	6	6
WC	(Australia) S Stojic	0	2
5	(Puerto Rico) M Puig	6	6

Third round
Q	(Japan) K Tsuji	5	4
(United States) C Makarova	7	6
(Japan) E Mutaguchi	3	4
5	(Puerto Rico) M Puig	6	6

Quarterfinals
(United States) C Makarova	5	2
5	(Puerto Rico) M Puig	7	6

==== Section 2 ====
First round
3/WC	(United States) Lauren Davis	6	6
WC	(Australia) Ashleigh Barty	0	3
(Thailand) Luksika Kumkhum	6	6
(Japan) Miyu Kato	4	1
(China) Tian Ran	2	6	6
(Belarus) Viktoryia Kisialeva	6	4	2
Q	(Japan) Mana Ayukawa	1	0
14	(Canada) Eugenie Bouchard	6	6
9	(Serbia) Natalija Kostić	7	5	1
(Slovakia) Anna Karolína Schmiedlová	6^{3}	7	6
WC	(Australia) Belinda Woolcock	6	5	6
(China) Zhu Lin	0	7	8
Q	(Uzbekistan) Nigina Abduraimova	5	2
(Japan) Risa Ozaki	7	6
(Sweden) Ellen Allgurin	2	6	1
7	(Russia) Yulia Putintseva	6	4	6

Second round
3/WC	(United States) L Davis	7	7
(Thailand) L Kumkhum	5	6^{5}
(China) R Tian	1	2
14	(Canada) E Bouchard	6	6
(Slovakia) AK Schmiedlová	6	6
(China) L Zhu	0	3
(Japan) R Ozaki	4	3
7	(Russia) Y Putintseva	6	6

Third round
3/WC	(United States) L Davis	0	3
14	(Canada) E Bouchard	6	6
(Slovakia) AK Schmiedlová	6	4	6
7	(Russia) Y Putintseva	2	6	3

Quarterfinals
14	(Canada) E Bouchard	6	6
(Slovakia) AK Schmiedlová	2	3

=== Bottom half ===
==== Section 3 ====
First round
8	(France) Caroline Garcia	6	6
(China) Dong Xiaorong	2	3
WC	(Australia) Storm Sanders	6	4	1
LL	(Japan) Ayaka Okuno	1	6	6
(New Zealand) Emily Fanning	4	3
(Uzbekistan) Sabina Sharipova	6	6
(Russia) Margarita Gasparyan	6	4	7
12	(Japan) Miho Kowase	1	6	5
13	(Belarus) Ilona Kremen	6	6
WC	(Australia) Samantha Harris	2	3
(Slovakia) Lucia Butkovská	6	2	2
(Netherlands) Demi Schuurs	3	6	6
(Japan) Nao Hibino	6	6
(China) Yang Zhaoxuan	3	3
(Australia) Abbie Myers	2	0
4	(Russia) Irina Khromacheva	6	6

Second round
8	(France) C Garcia	6	6
LL	(Japan) A Okuno	3	3
(Uzbekistan) S Sharipova	6	1	6
(Russia) M Gasparyan	4	6	2
13	(Belarus) I Kremen	7	6
(Netherlands) D Schuurs	6^{2}	2
(Japan) N Hibino	3	0
4	(Russia) I Khromacheva	6	6

Third round
8	(France) C Garcia	6	6
(Uzbekistan) S Sharipova	4	3
13	(Belarus) I Kremen	2	6	3
4	(Russia) I Khromacheva	6	3	6

Quarterfinals
8	(France) C Garcia	6	6
4	(Russia) I Khromacheva	1	3

==== Section 4 ====
First round
6	(China) Zheng Saisai	6	4	6
(Japan) Rio Kitagawa	2	6	0
(United States) Monica Turewicz	6	6
Q	(Belarus) Natallia Vavulina	1	3
(Czech Republic) Denisa Allertová	6	6
(Japan) Makoto Ninomiya	1	2
WC	(Australia) Brooke Rischbieth	3	3
11	(Montenegro) Danka Kovinić	6	6
16	(Slovenia) Nastja Kolar	7	7
(New Caledonia) Anaève Pain	6^{2}	6^{3}
(South Korea) Jang Su-jeong	7	7
(Russia) Ekaterina Semenova	5	6^{2}
(Japan) Eri Hozumi	6	7
(Australia) Azra Hadzic	1	5
(China) Deng Mengning	1	1
2	(Belgium) An-Sophie Mestach	6	6

Second round
6	(China) S Zheng	6	6
(United States) M Turewicz	2	2
(Czech Republic) D Allertová	1	6	2
11	(Montenegro) D Kovinić	6	2	6
16	(Slovenia) N Kolar	6	2	9
(South Korea) S-j Jang	2	6	7
(Japan) E Hozumi	3	2
2	(Belgium) A-S Mestach	6	6

Third round
6	(China) S Zheng	1	2
11	(Montenegro) D Kovinić	6	6
16	(Slovenia) N Kolar	1	2
2	(Belgium) A-S Mestach	6	6

Quarterfinals
11	(Montenegro) D Kovinić	1	3
2	(Belgium) A-S Mestach	6	6
