= 2011 Australian Open – Boys' singles =

Boys' singles
- 2011 Australian Open

Final
- Champion: (Czech Republic) Jiří Veselý
- Runner-up: (Australia) Luke Saville
- Score: 6–0, 6–3

Events
Singles	men	women		boys	girls
Doubles	men	women	mixed	boys	girls
WC Singles	men	women	quad
WC Doubles	men	women	quad
Legends	men	women	mixed
- Australian Open

Tiago Fernandes was the defending champion, having defeated Sean Berman in the 2010 final. He chose not to defend his title.
Jiří Veselý won the title defeating Luke Saville 6–0, 6–3, in the final. The player from Czech Republic won every match in straight sets.

== Seeds ==
1. (Czech Republic) Jiří Veselý (champion)
2. (Austria) Dominic Thiem (second round)
3. (Croatia) Mate Pavić (first round)
4. (United Kingdom) George Morgan (semifinals)
5. (Belgium) Joris De Loore (first round)
6. (Spain) Roberto Carballes (semifinals)
7. (Australia) Ben Wagland (first round)
8. (Philippines) Jeson Patrombon (quarterfinals)
9. (Brazil) Bruno Sant'anna (second round)
10. (Australia) Andrew Whittington (third round)
11. (Slovakia) Filip Horanský (first round)
12. (Switzerland) Dimitri Bretting (first round)
13. (Serbia) Nikola Milojević (third round)
14. (Croatia) Mate Delić (third round)
15. (Australia) Sean Berman (third round)
16. (Czech Republic) Lukáš Vrňák (first round)

Note: Bruno Sant'anna forgot to apply for a place in the tournament. He was given a wild card for the qualification round through which he qualified for the tournament.

== Draw ==
Key

- Q = Qualifier
- WC = Wild card
- LL = Lucky loser
- Alt = Alternate
- ITF = ITF entry
- PR = Protected ranking
- SR = Special ranking
- SE = Special exempt
- JE = Junior exempt
- JR = Junior Accelerator Programme entrant
- CO = College Accelerator Programme entrant
- NG = Next Gen Accelerator Program entrant
- w/o = Walkover
- r = Retired
- d = Defaulted

=== Final rounds ===
Quarterfinals
1	(Czech Republic) Jiří Veselý	6	6
(United States) Mitchell Krueger	2	2
4	(United Kingdom) George Morgan	5	6	6
8	(Philippines) Jeson Patrombon	7	2	3
6	(Spain) Roberto Carballes	6	6
Q	(United States) Mac Styslinger	3	2
(France) Lucas Pouille	5	5
(Australia) Luke Saville	7	7

Semifinals
1	(Czech Republic) Jiří Veselý	6	6
4	(United Kingdom) George Morgan	3	4
6	(Spain) Roberto Carballes	2	1
(Australia) Luke Saville	6	6

Final
1	(Czech Republic) Jiří Veselý	6	6
(Australia) Luke Saville	0	3

=== Top half ===
==== Section 1 ====
First round
1	(Czech Republic) Jiří Veselý	6	6
(Russia) Evgeny Karlovskiy	3	3
(Slovenia) Nik Razboršek	6	6^{1}	2
(Austria) Dennis Novak	4	7	6
(Belarus) Yaraslau Shyla	6	6^{5}	6
(China) Gao Xin	2	7	1
(Brazil) Karue Sell	2	4
15	(Australia) Sean Berman	6	6
11	(Slovakia) Filip Horanský	2	7	1
(Japan) Ryota Kishi	6	5	6
WC	(Australia) Mark Richards	3	6	6
Q	(Spain) Oriol Roca Batalla	6	4	4
WC	(Australia) Andrew Harris	4	3
(Germany) Matthias Wunner	6	6
(United States) Mitchell Krueger	7	7
5	(Belgium) Joris De Loore	6^{4}	6^{4}

Second round
1	(Czech Republic) J Veselý	6	6
(Austria) D Novak	2	4
(Belarus) Y Shyla	5	1
15	(Australia) S Berman	7	6
(Japan) R Kishi	4	5
WC	(Australia) M Richards	6	7
(Germany) M Wunner	6	6^{3}	2
(United States) M Krueger	4	7	6

Third round
1	(Czech Republic) J Veselý	6	6
15	(Australia) S Berman	4	1
WC	(Australia) M Richards	1	6	1
(United States) M Krueger	6	3	6

Quarterfinal
1	(Czech Republic) J Veselý	6	6
(United States) M Krueger	2	2

==== Section 2 ====
First round
4	(United Kingdom) George Morgan	7	6
(Brazil) Thiago Moura Monteiro	6^{3}	4
(South Korea) Kim Jae-hwan	6	7
Q	(Australia) Thanasi Kokkinakis	4	5
(Germany) Julian Lenz	6	6
Q	(Spain) Axel Álvarez Llamas	1	4
WC	(Australia) Andrew McLeod	3	1
14	(Croatia) Mate Delić	6	6
10	(Australia) Andrew Whittington	6	3	6
(Romania) Vasile-Alexandru Ghilea	3	6	1
Q	(France) Thomas Szewczyk	6	6
(Canada) Filip Peliwo	1	1
(Serbia) Miki Janković	6	6
(Thailand) Wishaya Trongcharoenchaikul	0	1
WC	(Australia) Jordan Thompson	4	6^{5}
8	(Philippines) Jeson Patrombon	6	7

Second round
4	(United Kingdom) G Morgan	7	6
(South Korea) Kim J-h	5	4
(Germany) J Lenz	4	1
14	(Croatia) M Delić	6	6
10	(Australia) A Whittington	6	1	6
Q	(France) T Szewczyk	2	6	2
(Serbia) M Janković	6^{4}	6	3
8	(Philippines) J Patrombon	7	3	6

Third round
4	(United Kingdom) G Morgan	6	6^{4}	10
14	(Croatia) M Delić	4	7	8
10	(Australia) A Whittington	4	6	0
8	(Philippines) J Patrombon	6	3	6

Quarterfinal
4	(United Kingdom) G Morgan	5	6	6
8	(Philippines) J Patrombon	7	2	3

=== Bottom half ===
==== Section 3 ====
First round
6	(Spain) Roberto Carballes	6	1	6
(Austria) Patrick Ofner	1	6	1
(Germany) Patrick Elias	7	6
WC	(Australia) Jack Schipanski	6^{3}	2
(Ukraine) Leonard Stakhovsky	6	4	6
(Mexico) Luis Patiño	4	6	4
WC	(Australia) Alex Bolt	6	3	8
9/Q	(Brazil) Bruno Sant'anna	1	6	10
16	(Czech Republic) Lukáš Vrňák	4	4
(Slovakia) Adrian Partl	6	6
WC	(Australia) Nick Kyrgios	6	6
(Russia) Vladimir Polyakov	4	4
(United Kingdom) Kyle Edmund	4	6^{2}
Q	(United States) Mac Styslinger	6	7
(Egypt) Karim Hossam	6	7
3	(Croatia) Mate Pavić	4	6^{3}

Second round
6	(Spain) R Carballes	6	6
(Germany) P Elias	2	3
(Ukraine) L Stakhovsky	6	6^{2}	6
9/Q	(Brazil) B Sant'anna	4	7	3
(Slovakia) A Partl	5	7	3
WC	(Australia) N Kyrgios	7	6^{6}	6
Q	(United States) M Styslinger	7	6
(Egypt) K Hossam	5	4

Third round
6	(Spain) R Carballes	6	6
(Ukraine) L Stakhovsky	3	2
WC	(Australia) N Kyrgios	3	4
Q	(United States) M Styslinger	6	6

Quarterfinal
6	(Spain) R Carballes	6	6
Q	(United States) M Styslinger	3	2

==== Section 4 ====
First round
7	(Australia) Ben Wagland	4	4
(Sweden) Stefan Lindmark	6	6
(Germany) Robin Kern	5	3
(Spain) Andrés Artuñedo	7	6
(France) Lucas Pouille	6	2	6
(Moldova) Maxim Dubarenco	3	6	4
Q	(New Zealand) Jaden Grinter	6	6
12	(Switzerland) Dimitri Bretting	3	2
13	(Serbia) Nikola Milojević	6	3	6
(Chinese Taipei) Wang Chieh-fu	2	6	1
Q	(Romania) Darius Florin Brăguși	3	2
WC	(Australia) Joey Swaysland	6	6
(Czech Republic) Adam Pavlásek	5	2
(Australia) Luke Saville	7	6
(United States) Dennis Novikov	6	4	3
2	(Austria) Dominic Thiem	4	6	6

Second round
(Sweden) S Lindmark	6^{1}	7	4
(Spain) A Artuñedo	7	5	6
(France) L Pouille	4	7	6
Q	(New Zealand) J Grinter	6	6^{0}	`
13	(Serbia) N Milojević	6	7
WC	(Australia) J Swaysland	2	6^{3}
(Australia) L Saville	7	6
2	(Austria) D Thiem	5	4

Third round
(Spain) A Artuñedo	2	1
(France) L Pouille	6	6
13	(Serbia) N Milojević	6	3	6
(Australia) L Saville	4	6	8

Quarterfinal
(France) L Pouille	5	5
(Australia) L Saville	7	7
