= 2011 Australian Open – Mixed doubles =

Mixed doubles
- 2011 Australian Open

Final
- Champions: (Slovenia) Katarina Srebotnik (Canada) Daniel Nestor
- Runners-up: (Chinese Taipei) Chan Yung-jan (Australia) Paul Hanley
- Score: 6–3, 3–6, [10–7]

Details
- Draw: 32
- Seeds: 8

Events
Singles	men	women		boys	girls
Doubles	men	women	mixed	boys	girls
WC Singles	men	women	quad
WC Doubles	men	women	quad
Legends	men	women	mixed
- Australian Open

Cara Black and Leander Paes were the defending champions, but they lost in the second round to Chan Yung-jan and Paul Hanley.

Katarina Srebotnik and Daniel Nestor won the mixed doubles title at the 2011 Australian Open, defeating Chan and Hanley in the final 6–3, 3–6, [10–7].

== Seeds ==
1. (United States) Liezel Huber / (United States) Bob Bryan (second round, withdrew)
2. (Slovenia) Katarina Srebotnik / (Canada) Daniel Nestor (champions)
3. (Russia) Maria Kirilenko / (Serbia) Nenad Zimonjić (semifinals)
4. (Zimbabwe) Cara Black / (India) Leander Paes (second round)
5. (Czech Republic) Květa Peschke / (Pakistan) Aisam-ul-Haq Qureshi (first round)
6. (United States) Lisa Raymond / (South Africa) Wesley Moodie (first round)
7. (Czech Republic) Iveta Benešová / (Czech Republic) Lukáš Dlouhý (withdrew)
8. (Czech Republic) Barbora Záhlavová-Strýcová / (Austria) Oliver Marach (second round)

== Draw ==
Key

- Q = Qualifier
- WC = Wild card
- LL = Lucky loser
- Alt = Alternate
- ITF = ITF entry
- PR = Protected ranking
- SR = Special ranking
- SE = Special exempt
- JE = Junior exempt
- JR = Junior Accelerator Programme entrant
- CO = College Accelerator Programme entrant
- NG = Next Gen Accelerator Program entrant
- w/o = Walkover
- r = Retired
- d = Defaulted

=== Finals ===
Semifinals
(United States) Bethanie Mattek-Sands (Romania) Horia Tecău	6	3	[9]
(Chinese Taipei) Chan Yung-jan (Australia) Paul Hanley	2	6	[11]
3	(Russia) Maria Kirilenko (Serbia) Nenad Zimonjić	4	5
2	(Slovenia) Katarina Srebotnik (Canada) Daniel Nestor	6	7

Final
(Chinese Taipei) Chan Yung-jan (Australia) Paul Hanley	3	6	[7]
2	(Slovenia) Katarina Srebotnik (Canada) Daniel Nestor	6	3	[10]

=== Top half ===
First round
1	(United States) L Huber (United States) B Bryan	7	6
(Russia) E Vesnina (The Bahamas) M Knowles	6^{4}	3
Alt	(Romania) M Niculescu (United States) E Butorac	1	2
WC	(Australia) S Peers (Australia) C Ball	6	6
WC	(Australia) S Ferguson (Australia) M Matosevic	6	2	[10]
WC	(Australia) O Rogowska (Australia) M Ebden	4	6	[8]
(United States) B Mattek-Sands (Romania) H Tecău	6	6
6	(United States) L Raymond (South Africa) W Moodie	4	2
4	(Zimbabwe) C Black (India) L Paes	7	4	[12]
(Russia) A Kleybanova (Belarus) M Mirnyi	6	6	[10]
(Chinese Taipei) Y-j Chan (Australia) P Hanley	6	6
Alt	(Romania) A Dulgheru (Germany) M Kohlmann	2	0
WC	(Australia) A Molik (Australia) P Luczak	3	6	[11]
(Chinese Taipei) C-j Chuang (Belgium) D Norman	6	3	[13]
WC	(Croatia) M Lučić (Australia) B Tomic	6^{3}	3
8	(Czech Republic) B Záhlavová-Strýcová (Austria) O Marach	7	6

Second round
1	(United States) L Huber (United States) B Bryan
WC	(Australia) S Peers (Australia) C Ball	w/o
WC	(Australia) S Ferguson (Australia) M Matosevic	1	2
(United States) B Mattek-Sands (Romania) H Tecău	6	6
4	(Zimbabwe) C Black (India) L Paes	6^{11}	6^{5}
(Chinese Taipei) Y-j Chan (Australia) P Hanley	7	7
(Chinese Taipei) C-j Chuang (Belgium) D Norman	6	6
8	(Czech Republic) B Záhlavová-Strýcová (Austria) O Marach	4	4

Quarterfinals
WC	(Australia) S Peers (Australia) C Ball	5	4
(United States) B Mattek-Sands (Romania) H Tecău	7	6
(Chinese Taipei) Y-j Chan (Australia) P Hanley	6	4	[10]
(Chinese Taipei) C-j Chuang (Belgium) D Norman	2	6	[7]

Semifinals
(United States) B Mattek-Sands (Romania) H Tecău	6	3	[9]
(Chinese Taipei) Y-j Chan (Australia) P Hanley	2	6	[11]

=== Bottom half ===
First round
5	(Czech Republic) K Peschke (Pakistan) A-u-H Qureshi	6	3	[5]
WC	(Australia) R Stubbs (Australia) C Guccione	3	6	[10]
(United States) M Shaughnessy (Israel) A Ram	6	7
(United States) V King (Brazil) M Melo	1	5
Alt	(Sweden) S Arvidsson (Germany) P Petzschner	6	6
Alt	(Poland) A Rosolska (United Kingdom) J Murray	3	3
(China) Z Yan (India) R Bopanna	6^{6}	1
3	(Russia) M Kirilenko (Serbia) N Zimonjić	7	6
Alt	(Italy) S Errani (Spain) D Marrero	7	6
WC	(Australia) J Groth (Australia) S Groth	6^{1}	3
(Germany) A Petkovic (Poland) M Fyrstenberg	2	2
(Australia) A Rodionova (India) M Bhupathi	6	6
(Spain) A Medina Garrigues (Spain) N Almagro	2	1
(Belarus) O Govortsova (Poland) M Matkowski	6	6
(Italy) R Vinci (Spain) M López	2	2
2	(Slovenia) K Srebotnik (Canada) D Nestor	6	6

Second round
WC	(Australia) R Stubbs (Australia) C Guccione	7	4	[5]
(United States) M Shaughnessy (Israel) A Ram	5	6	[10]
Alt	(Sweden) S Arvidsson (Germany) P Petzschner	3	4
3	(Russia) M Kirilenko (Serbia) N Zimonjić	6	6
Alt	(Italy) S Errani (Spain) D Marrero	3	1
(Australia) A Rodionova (India) M Bhupathi	6	6
(Belarus) O Govortsova (Poland) M Matkowski	6	4	[4]
2	(Slovenia) K Srebotnik (Canada) D Nestor	4	6	[10]

Quarterfinals
(United States) M Shaughnessy (Israel) A Ram	1	6^{1}
3	(Russia) M Kirilenko (Serbia) N Zimonjić	6	7
(Australia) A Rodionova (India) M Bhupathi	w/o
2	(Slovenia) K Srebotnik (Canada) D Nestor

Semifinals
3	(Russia) M Kirilenko (Serbia) N Zimonjić	4	5
2	(Slovenia) K Srebotnik (Canada) D Nestor	6	7
