= 2011 Australian Open – Wheelchair men's singles =

Wheelchair men's singles
- 2011 Australian Open

Final
- Champion: (Japan) Shingo Kunieda
- Runner-up: (France) Stéphane Houdet
- Score: 6–0, 6–3

Events
| Singles | men | women | | boys | girls |
| Doubles | men | women | mixed | boys | girls |
| WC Singles | men | women | quad |
| WC Doubles | men | women | quad |
| Legends | men | women | mixed |
- Australian Open

Four-time defending champion Shingo Kunieda defeated Stéphane Houdet in the final, 6–0, 6–3 to win the men's singles wheelchair tennis title at the 2011 Australian Open. It was his fifth Australian Open singles title and twelfth major singles title overall.

== Seeds ==
1. (Japan) Shingo Kunieda (champion)
2. (France) Stéphane Houdet (final)

== Draw ==
Key

- Q = Qualifier
- WC = Wild card
- LL = Lucky loser
- Alt = Alternate
- ITF = ITF entry
- PR = Protected ranking
- SR = Special ranking
- SE = Special exempt
- JE = Junior exempt
- JR = Junior Accelerator Programme entrant
- CO = College Accelerator Programme entrant
- NG = Next Gen Accelerator Program entrant
- w/o = Walkover
- r = Retired
- d = Defaulted

=== Finals ===
Quarterfinals
1 | (Japan) Shingo Kunieda | 6 | 6
(Netherlands) Ronald Vink | 1 | 0
(Netherlands) Robin Ammerlaan | 6 | 6
WC | (Australia) Ben Weekes | 1 | 3
(France) Nicolas Peifer | 6^{5} | 4
(Sweden) Stefan Olsson | 7^{7} | 6
(Netherlands) Maikel Scheffers | 3 | 3
2 | (France) Stéphane Houdet | 6 | 6

Semifinals
1 | (Japan) Shingo Kunieda | 6 | 6
(Netherlands) Robin Ammerlaan | 4 | 4
(Sweden) Stefan Olsson | 1 | 4
2 | (France) Stéphane Houdet | 6 | 6

Final
1 | (Japan) Shingo Kunieda | 6 | 6
2 | (France) Stéphane Houdet | 0 | 3
