= 2011 Australian Open – Wheelchair quad singles =

Wheelchair quad singles
- 2011 Australian Open

Final
- Champion: (United States) David Wagner
- Runner-up: (United Kingdom) Peter Norfolk
- Score: 6–2, 6–3

Events
Singles	men	women		boys	girls
Doubles	men	women	mixed	boys	girls
WC Singles	men	women	quad
WC Doubles	men	women	quad
Legends	men	women	mixed
- Australian Open

David Wagner defeated the three-time defending champion Peter Norfolk in the final, 6–2, 6–3 to win the quad singles wheelchair tennis title at the 2011 Australian Open.

== Seeds ==
1. (United States) David Wagner (champion)
2. (United Kingdom) Peter Norfolk (finals)

== Draw ==
Key

- Q = Qualifier
- WC = Wild card
- LL = Lucky loser
- Alt = Alternate
- ITF = ITF entry
- PR = Protected ranking
- SR = Special ranking
- SE = Special exempt
- JE = Junior exempt
- JR = Junior Accelerator Programme entrant
- CO = College Accelerator Programme entrant
- NG = Next Gen Accelerator Program entrant
- w/o = Walkover
- r = Retired
- d = Defaulted

=== Final ===
Final
1	(United States) David Wagner	6	6
2	(United Kingdom) Peter Norfolk	2	3

=== Round robin ===
		(United States) Wagner	(United States) Taylor	(United Kingdom) Lapthorne	(United Kingdom) Norfolk	RR; W–L	Set; W–L	Game; W–L	Standings
1	(United States) David Wagner		6–0, 6–2	6–3, 6–3	6–4, 3–6, 6–4	3–0	6–1	39–22	1
	(United States) Nicholas Taylor	0–6, 2–6		6–7(4–7), 4–6	3–6, 0–6	0–3	0–6	15–37	4
	(United Kingdom) Andrew Lapthorne	3–6, 3–6	7–6(7–4), 6–4		2–6, 2–6	1–2	2–4	23–34	3
2	(United Kingdom) Peter Norfolk	4–6, 6–3, 4–6	6–3, 6–0	6–2, 6–2		2–1	5–2	38–22	2

Standings are determined by: 1. number of wins; 2. number of matches; 3. in two-players-ties, head-to-head records; 4. in three-players-ties, percentage of sets won, or of games won; 5. steering-committee decision.
