= 2011 Australian Open – Men's doubles =

Men's doubles
- 2011 Australian Open

Final
- Champion: (United States) Bob Bryan (United States) Mike Bryan
- Runner-up: (India) Mahesh Bhupathi (India) Leander Paes
- Score: 6–3, 6–4

Details
- Draw: 64
- Seeds: 16

Events
Singles	men	women		boys	girls
Doubles	men	women	mixed	boys	girls
WC Singles	men	women	quad
WC Doubles	men	women	quad
Legends	men	women	mixed
- Australian Open

Bob and Mike Bryan, the two-time defending champions in this event, successfully defended their title. They defeated Mahesh Bhupathi and Leander Paes 6–3, 6–4 in the final. Both Paes and Bhupathi were vying to complete the career Grand Slam.

== Seeds ==
1. (United States) Bob Bryan / (United States) Mike Bryan (champions)
2. (Belarus) Max Mirnyi / (Canada) Daniel Nestor (semifinals)
3. (India) Mahesh Bhupathi / (India) Leander Paes (final)
4. (Poland) Łukasz Kubot / (Austria) Oliver Marach (quarterfinals)
5. (Poland) Mariusz Fyrstenberg / (Poland) Marcin Matkowski (quarterfinals)
6. (Austria) Jürgen Melzer / (Germany) Philipp Petzschner (quarterfinals)
7. (Czech Republic) Lukáš Dlouhý / (Australia) Paul Hanley (first round)
8. (France) Michaël Llodra / (Serbia) Nenad Zimonjić (quarterfinals)
9. (South Africa) Wesley Moodie / (Belgium) Dick Norman (first round)
10. (India) Rohan Bopanna / (Pakistan) Aisam-ul-Haq Qureshi (third round)
11. (Sweden) Robert Lindstedt / (Romania) Horia Tecău (first round, retired)
12. (The Bahamas) Mark Knowles / (Slovakia) Michal Mertiňák (second round)
13. (Spain) Marcel Granollers / (Spain) Tommy Robredo (third round)
14. (Israel) Jonathan Erlich / (Israel) Andy Ram (second round)
15. (Spain) Nicolás Almagro / (Spain) Marc López (first round)
16. (Brazil) Marcelo Melo / (Brazil) Bruno Soares (first round)

== Draw ==
Key

- Q = Qualifier
- WC = Wild card
- LL = Lucky loser
- Alt = Alternate
- ITF = ITF entry
- PR = Protected ranking
- SR = Special ranking
- SE = Special exempt
- JE = Junior exempt
- JR = Junior Accelerator Programme entrant
- CO = College Accelerator Programme entrant
- NG = Next Gen Accelerator Program entrant
- w/o = Walkover
- r = Retired
- d = Defaulted

=== Finals ===
Quarterfinals
1	(United States) Bob Bryan (United States) Mike Bryan	6	7
6	(Austria) Jürgen Melzer (Germany) Philipp Petzschner	3	6^{7}
4	(Poland) Łukasz Kubot (Austria) Oliver Marach	3	4
(United States) Eric Butorac (Curaçao) Jean-Julien Rojer	6	6
8	(France) Michaël Llodra (Serbia) Nenad Zimonjić	4	4
3	(India) Mahesh Bhupathi (India) Leander Paes	6	6
5	(Poland) Mariusz Fyrstenberg (Poland) Marcin Matkowski	6^{3}	3
2	(Belarus) Max Mirnyi (Canada) Daniel Nestor	7	6

Semifinals
1	(United States) Bob Bryan (United States) Mike Bryan	6	6
(United States) Eric Butorac (Curaçao) Jean-Julien Rojer	3	2
3	(India) Mahesh Bhupathi (India) Leander Paes	7	4	6
2	(Belarus) Max Mirnyi (Canada) Daniel Nestor	6^{5}	6	3

Final
1	(United States) Bob Bryan (United States) Mike Bryan	6	6
3	(India) Mahesh Bhupathi (India) Leander Paes	3	4

=== Top half ===
==== Section 1 ====
First round
1	(United States) B Bryan (United States) M Bryan	6	3	6
(United States) S Lipsky (United States) R Ram	3	6	4
(Czech Republic) F Čermak (Germany) C Kas	4	5
(Argentina) C Berlocq (Spain) P Riba	6	7
(Germany) B Becker (Germany) M Kohlmann	7	7
Alt	(Thailand) Sa Ratiwatana (Thailand) So Ratiwatana	5	5
(Slovakia) F Polášek (Slovakia) I Zelenay	6	4	6
16	(Brazil) M Melo (Brazil) B Soares	4	6	2
9	(South Africa) W Moodie (Belgium) D Norman	4	0
(Belgium) X Malisse (United Kingdom) J Murray	6	6
(Germany) B Phau (Serbia) J Tipsarević	6	6
(Croatia) I Ljubičić (Croatia) L Zovko	1	4
(Germany) M Berrer (Germany) F Mayer	6	6
Alt	(Australia) R Junaid (Germany) T Kamke	3	2
(Argentina) B Dabul (Colombia) S Giraldo	6^{3}	1
6	(Austria) J Melzer (Germany) P Petzschner	7	6

Second round
1	(United States) B Bryan (United States) M Bryan	7	6
(Argentina) C Berlocq (Spain) P Riba	6^{6}	3
(Germany) B Becker (Germany) M Kohlmann	6	6
(Slovakia) F Polášek (Slovakia) I Zelenay	4	4
(Belgium) X Malisse (United Kingdom) J Murray	6	4	3
(Germany) B Phau (Serbia) J Tipsarević	3	6	6
(Germany) M Berrer (Germany) F Mayer	3	1
6	(Austria) J Melzer (Germany) P Petzschner	6	6

Third round
1	(United States) B Bryan (United States) M Bryan	7	6
(Germany) B Becker (Germany) M Kohlmann	5	2
(Germany) B Phau (Serbia) J Tipsarević	3	2
6	(Austria) J Melzer (Germany) P Petzschner	6	6

Quarterfinals
1	(United States) B Bryan (United States) M Bryan	6	7
6	(Austria) J Melzer (Germany) P Petzschner	3	6^{7}

==== Section 2 ====
First round
4	(Poland) Ł Kubot (Austria) O Marach	6	6
(Sweden) J Brunström (Australia) S Huss	3	3
WC	(Australia) M Ebden (Australia) P Luczak	6^{4}	6	3
WC	(Australia) S Groth (Australia) G Jones	7	3	6
(Australia) A Fisher (Australia) J Kerr	4	4
(Croatia) I Dodig (Finland) J Nieminen	6	6
(Italy) D Bracciali (Italy) P Starace	1	7	7
15	(Spain) N Almagro (Spain) M López	6	6^{3}	5
12	(The Bahamas) M Knowles (Slovakia) M Mertiňák	6	7
(Russia) T Gabashvili (Kazakhstan) M Kukushkin	4	6^{5}
(Kazakhstan) A Golubev (Uzbekistan) D Istomin	7	4	0
(United States) E Butorac (Curaçao) J-J Rojer	6^{4}	6	6
(Argentina) JI Chela (Argentina) L Mayer	5	3
(Ukraine) S Stakhovsky (Russia) M Youzhny	7	6
(Spain) D Marrero (Spain) R Ramírez Hidalgo	6	1	6
7	(Czech Republic) L Dlouhý (Australia) P Hanley	4	6	1

Second round
4	(Poland) Ł Kubot (Austria) O Marach	6	6
WC	(Australia) S Groth (Australia) G Jones	1	3
(Croatia) I Dodig (Finland) J Nieminen	4	4
(Italy) D Bracciali (Italy) P Starace	6	6
12	(The Bahamas) M Knowles (Slovakia) M Mertiňák	6^{3}	0
(United States) E Butorac (Curaçao) J-J Rojer	7	6
(Ukraine) S Stakhovsky (Russia) M Youzhny	6	4	4
(Spain) D Marrero (Spain) R Ramírez Hidalgo	2	6	6

Third round
4	(Poland) Ł Kubot (Austria) O Marach	6	6
(Italy) D Bracciali (Italy) P Starace	3	1
(United States) E Butorac (Curaçao) J-J Rojer	6	6
(Spain) D Marrero (Spain) R Ramírez Hidalgo	3	4

Quarterfinals
4	(Poland) Ł Kubot (Austria) O Marach	3	4
(United States) E Butorac (Curaçao) J-J Rojer	6	6

=== Bottom half ===
==== Section 3 ====
First round
8	(France) M Llodra (Serbia) N Zimonjić	6	6
(South Africa) K Anderson (Romania) V Hănescu	3	4
(Spain) P Andújar (Spain) D Gimeno-Traver	7	7
(Uruguay) P Cuevas (Argentina) E Schwank	6^{5}	5
(United States) T Parrott (United Kingdom) K Skupski	6^{6}	3
(France) J Chardy (France) A Clément	7	6
(Brazil) F Ferreiro (Brazil) A Sá	3	0
10	(India) R Bopanna (Pakistan) A-u-H Qureshi	6	6
13	(Spain) M Granollers (Spain) T Robredo	6	6
(France) É Roger-Vasselin (France) G Simon	1	1
(Ukraine) A Dolgopolov (Czech Republic) J Hájek	6	6^{4}	6
(Italy) F Fognini (Slovakia) L Lacko	3	7	2
(Spain) F López (Argentina) J Mónaco	3	6	6
WC	(Australia) M Matosevic (Australia) J Millman	6	0	1
(Croatia) I Karlović (Serbia) D Vemić	7	3	0
3	(India) M Bhupathi (India) L Paes	5	6	6

Second round
8	(France) M Llodra (Serbia) N Zimonjić	6	6
(Spain) P Andújar (Spain) D Gimeno-Traver	3	2
(France) J Chardy (France) A Clément	3	6	4
10	(India) R Bopanna (Pakistan) A-u-H Qureshi	6	4	6
13	(Spain) M Granollers (Spain) T Robredo	7	6
(Ukraine) A Dolgopolov (Czech Republic) J Hájek	5	3
(Spain) F López (Argentina) J Mónaco	6^{2}	4
3	(India) M Bhupathi (India) L Paes	7	6

Third round
8	(France) M Llodra (Serbia) N Zimonjić	3	7	7
10	(India) R Bopanna (Pakistan) A-u-H Qureshi	6	6^{6}	6^{3}
13	(Spain) M Granollers (Spain) T Robredo	4	6	4
3	(India) M Bhupathi (India) L Paes	6	4	6

Quarterfinals
8	(France) M Llodra (Serbia) N Zimonjić	4	4
3	(India) M Bhupathi (India) L Paes	6	6

==== Section 4 ====
First round
5	(Poland) M Fyrstenberg (Poland) M Matkowski	6	7
(Spain) G García-López (Spain) A Montañés	3	5
(Chinese Taipei) Y-h Lu (Germany) R Schüttler	7	7
(Sweden) S Aspelin (Austria) A Peya	6^{5}	6^{5}
(Germany) D Brown (Netherlands) R Wassen	6	6
(Russia) D Tursunov (Germany) M Zverev	2	3
WC	(Australia) C Ebelthite (Australia) A Feeney	4	0
11	(Sweden) R Lindstedt (Romania) H Tecău	6	1	r
14	(Israel) J Erlich (Israel) A Ram	4	6	6
(United Kingdom) C Fleming (United Kingdom) R Hutchins	6	2	2
WC	(Australia) J Lemke (Australia) M Reid	4	6^{4}
WC	(Australia) C Ball (Australia) C Guccione	6	7
(Israel) D Sela (Italy) A Seppi	6^{2}	6	6^{5}
(Mexico) S González (Germany) P Marx	7	3	7
WC	(Australia) J Duckworth (Australia) B Mitchell	3	3
2	(Belarus) M Mirnyi (Canada) D Nestor	6	6

Second round
5	(Poland) M Fyrstenberg (Poland) M Matkowski	6	6
(Chinese Taipei) Y-h Lu (Germany) R Schüttler	2	3
(Germany) D Brown (Netherlands) R Wassen	3	6	2
WC	(Australia) C Ebelthite (Australia) A Feeney	6	3	6
14	(Israel) J Erlich (Israel) A Ram	6^{7}	7	2
WC	(Australia) C Ball (Australia) C Guccione	7	6^{3}	6
(Mexico) S González (Germany) P Marx	3	4
2	(Belarus) M Mirnyi (Canada) D Nestor	6	6

Third round
5	(Poland) M Fyrstenberg (Poland) M Matkowski	6	4	6
WC	(Australia) C Ebelthite (Australia) A Feeney	1	6	4
WC	(Australia) C Ball (Australia) C Guccione	4	5
2	(Belarus) M Mirnyi (Canada) D Nestor	6	7

Quarterfinals
5	(Poland) M Fyrstenberg (Poland) M Matkowski	6^{3}	3
2	(Belarus) M Mirnyi (Canada) D Nestor	7	6
