= 2011 Australian Open – Men's singles =

Tennis tournament held in 2011

Men's singles
- 2011 Australian Open

Final
- Champion: (Serbia) Novak Djokovic
- Runner-up: (United Kingdom) Andy Murray
- Score: 6–4, 6–2, 6–3

Details
- Draw: 128 (16Q / 8WC)
- Seeds: 32

Events
Singles	men	women		boys	girls
Doubles	men	women	mixed	boys	girls
WC Singles	men	women	quad
WC Doubles	men	women	quad
Legends	men	women	mixed
- Australian Open

Novak Djokovic defeated Andy Murray in the final, 6–4, 6–2, 6–3 to win the men's singles tennis title at the 2011 Australian Open. It was his second Australian Open title and second major title overall.

Roger Federer was the defending champion, but lost in the semifinals to Djokovic. With his quarterfinal win over Stanislas Wawrinka, Federer broke Jack Crawford's record for the most match wins at the Australian Open.

Rafael Nadal was attempting to complete a non-calendar-year Grand Slam and to become the first man since Rod Laver in 1969 to hold all four major titles at once, having won the preceding French Open, Wimbledon and US Open in 2010, but lost in the quarterfinals to David Ferrer.

== Seeds ==
1. (Spain) Rafael Nadal (quarterfinals)
2. (Switzerland) Roger Federer (semifinals)
3. (Serbia) Novak Djokovic (champion)
4. (Sweden) Robin Söderling (fourth round)
5. (United Kingdom) Andy Murray (final)
6. (Czech Republic) Tomáš Berdych (quarterfinals)
7. (Spain) David Ferrer (semifinals)
8. (United States) Andy Roddick (fourth round)
9. (Spain) Fernando Verdasco (fourth round)
10. (Russia) Mikhail Youzhny (third round)
11. (Austria) Jürgen Melzer (fourth round)
12. (France) Gaël Monfils (third round)
13. (France) Jo-Wilfried Tsonga (third round)
14. (Spain) Nicolás Almagro (fourth round)
15. (Croatia) Marin Čilić (fourth round)
16. (United States) Mardy Fish (second round)

17. (Croatia) Ivan Ljubičić (third round)
18. (United States) Sam Querrey (first round)
19. (Switzerland) Stan Wawrinka (quarterfinals)
20. (United States) John Isner (third round)
21. (Cyprus) Marcos Baghdatis (third round, retired due to a right finger injury)
22. (France) Michaël Llodra (second round)
23. (Russia) Nikolay Davydenko (first round)
24. (Latvia) Ernests Gulbis (first round)
25. (Spain) Albert Montañés (second round)
26. (Argentina) Juan Mónaco (second round)
27. (Argentina) David Nalbandian (second round, retired due to fatigue)
28. (France) Richard Gasquet (third round)
29. (Serbia) Viktor Troicki (third round, retired due to stomach pain)
30. (Brazil) Thomaz Bellucci (second round)
31. (Spain) Feliciano López (second round)
32. (Spain) Guillermo García-López (third round)

Click on the seed number of a player to go to their draw section.

== Draw ==
Key

- Q = Qualifier
- WC = Wild card
- LL = Lucky loser
- Alt = Alternate
- ITF = ITF entry
- PR = Protected ranking
- SR = Special ranking
- SE = Special exempt
- JE = Junior exempt
- JR = Junior Accelerator Programme entrant
- CO = College Accelerator Programme entrant
- NG = Next Gen Accelerator Program entrant
- w/o = Walkover
- r = Retired
- d = Defaulted

=== Finals ===
Quarterfinals
1	(Spain) Rafael Nadal	4	2	3
7	(Spain) David Ferrer	6	6	6
(Ukraine) Alexandr Dolgopolov	5	3	7^{7}	3
5	(United Kingdom) Andy Murray	7	6	6^{3}	6
6	(Czech Republic) Tomáš Berdych	1	6^{5}	1
3	(Serbia) Novak Djokovic	6	7^{7}	6
19	(Switzerland) Stan Wawrinka	1	3	3
2	(Switzerland) Roger Federer	6	6	6

Semifinals
7	(Spain) David Ferrer	6	6^{2}	1	6^{2}
5	(United Kingdom) Andy Murray	4	7^{7}	6	7^{7}
3	(Serbia) Novak Djokovic	7^{7}	7	6
2	(Switzerland) Roger Federer	6^{3}	5	4

Final
5	(United Kingdom) Andy Murray	4	2	3
3	(Serbia) Novak Djokovic	6	6	6

=== Top half ===
==== Section 1 ====
First round
1	(Spain) R Nadal	6	5
(Brazil) M Daniel	0	0^{r}
Q	(United States) R Sweeting	6	6	6
(Spain) D Gimeno-Traver	4	4	1
WC	(Australia) B Tomic	6	6	7^{7}
(France) J Chardy	3	2	6^{5}
(Colombia) A Falla	3	6^{6}	3
31	(Spain) F López	6	7^{8}	6
20	(United States) J Isner	6	7^{10}	6
(France) F Serra	3	6^{8}	3
(Czech Republic) R Štěpánek	6	6	6
Q	(Germany) D Gremelmayr	3	2	3
(Portugal) R Machado	4	3	7	1
(Colombia) S Giraldo	6	6	5	6
Q	(United States) D Young	3	2	1
15	(Croatia) M Čilić	6	6	6

Second round
1	(Spain) R Nadal	6	6	6
Q	(United States) R Sweeting	2	1	1
WC	(Australia) B Tomic	7^{7}	7^{7}	6
31	(Spain) F López	6^{4}	6^{3}	3
20	(United States) J Isner	4	6	6	6
(Czech Republic) R Štěpánek	6	4	2	1
(Colombia) S Giraldo	3	6^{1}	1
15	(Croatia) M Čilić	6	7^{7}	6

Third round
1	(Spain) R Nadal	6	7	6
WC	(Australia) B Tomic	2	5	3
20	(United States) J Isner	6	2	7^{7}	6^{2}	7
15	(Croatia) M Čilić	4	6	6^{5}	7^{7}	9

Fourth round
1	(Spain) R Nadal	6	6	6
15	(Croatia) M Čilić	2	4	3

==== Section 2 ====
First round
10	(Russia) M Youzhny	6	6	7^{7}
(Turkey) M İlhan	2	3	6^{5}
Q	(Slovenia) B Kavčič	2	6	7^{7}	7^{7}
(South Africa) K Anderson	6	4	6^{4}	6^{5}
Q	(Canada) M Raonic	7^{7}	6	7^{10}
(Germany) B Phau	6^{3}	3	6^{8}
(Argentina) JI Chela	3	6	2	4
22	(France) M Llodra	6	3	6	6
27	(Argentina) D Nalbandian	3	6	3	7^{7}	9
(Australia) L Hewitt	6	4	6	6^{1}	7
(Lithuania) R Berankis	6	6	7
WC	(Australia) M Matosevic	4	2	5
(United States) M Russell	6	6	5	7^{11}
WC	(Australia) M Ebden	3	2	7	6^{9}
(Finland) J Nieminen	4	3	6	2
7	(Spain) D Ferrer	6	6	1	6

Second round
10	(Russia) M Youzhny	6	6	5	4	6
Q	(Slovenia) B Kavčič	3	1	7	6	1
Q	(Canada) M Raonic	7^{7}	6	7^{7}
22	(France) M Llodra	6^{3}	3	6^{4}
27	(Argentina) D Nalbandian	1	0	0^{r}
(Lithuania) R Berankis	6	6	2
(United States) M Russell	0	1	5
7	(Spain) D Ferrer	6	6	7

Third round
10	(Russia) M Youzhny	4	5	6	4
Q	(Canada) M Raonic	6	7	4	6
(Lithuania) R Berankis	2	2	1
7	(Spain) D Ferrer	6	6	6

Fourth round
Q	(Canada) M Raonic	6	2	3	4
7	(Spain) D Ferrer	4	6	6	6

==== Section 3 ====
First round
4	(Sweden) R Söderling	6	6	6
(Italy) P Starace	4	2	2
Q	(Luxembourg) G Müller	6	7^{7}	6
Q	(Germany) S Stadler	3	6^{5}	4
(Uzbekistan) D Istomin	3	4	6	2
Q	(Czech Republic) J Hernych	6	6	3	6
(Brazil) R Mello	5	5	6	6	3
30	(Brazil) T Bellucci	7	7	4	3	6
24	(Latvia) E Gulbis	6^{5}	2	4
(Germany) B Becker	7^{7}	6	6
(Ukraine) A Dolgopolov	6	6	6
(Kazakhstan) M Kukushkin	3	2	4
(Italy) A Seppi	3	2	7	6	6
(France) A Clément	6	6	5	3	2
(Germany) P Petzschner	6	6	2	3	4
13	(France) J-W Tsonga	4	2	6	6	6

Second round
4	(Sweden) R Söderling	6	7^{7}	6
Q	(Luxembourg) G Müller	3	6^{1}	1
Q	(Czech Republic) J Hernych	6	6^{11}	6	6^{3}	8
30	(Brazil) T Bellucci	2	7^{13}	4	7^{7}	6
(Germany) B Becker	3	0	6	6^{3}
(Ukraine) A Dolgopolov	6	6	3	7^{7}
(Italy) A Seppi	3	6^{1}	6^{5}
13	(France) J-W Tsonga	6	7^{7}	7^{7}

Third round
4	(Sweden) R Söderling	6	6	6
Q	(Czech Republic) J Hernych	3	1	4
(Ukraine) A Dolgopolov	3	6	3	6	6
13	(France) J-W Tsonga	6	3	6	1	1

Fourth round
4	(Sweden) R Söderling	6	3	1	6	2
(Ukraine) A Dolgopolov	1	6	6	4	6

==== Section 4 ====
First round
11	(Austria) J Melzer	6	6	6
Q	(France) V Millot	2	4	2
WC	(Australia) C Ball	6	6^{5}	2	6	4
(Spain) P Riba	1	7^{7}	6	2	6
(Israel) D Sela	6^{13}	4	4
PR	(Argentina) JM del Potro	7^{15}	6	6
Q	(Slovenia) G Žemlja	6	5	1	6	2
21	(Cyprus) M Baghdatis	3	7	6	4	6
32	(Spain) G García-López	6	6	3	6
(Germany) M Berrer	4	4	6	3
(Argentina) E Schwank	6	6	6
(Argentina) L Mayer	2	0	4
(Ukraine) I Marchenko	6	6	6
(Spain) R Ramírez Hidalgo	3	4	1
(Slovakia) K Beck	3	1	2^{r}
5	(United Kingdom) A Murray	6	6	4

Second round
11	(Austria) J Melzer	6	6	6
(Spain) P Riba	2	4	2
PR	(Argentina) JM del Potro	1	3	6	3
21	(Cyprus) M Baghdatis	6	6	4	6
32	(Spain) G García-López	6	7^{10}	6
(Argentina) E Schwank	4	6^{8}	1
(Ukraine) I Marchenko	1	3	3
5	(United Kingdom) A Murray	6	6	6

Third round
11	(Austria) J Melzer	6^{5}	6	6	4
21	(Cyprus) M Baghdatis	7^{7}	2	1	3^{r}
32	(Spain) G García-López	1	1	2
5	(United Kingdom) A Murray	6	6	6

Fourth round
11	(Austria) J Melzer	3	1	1
5	(United Kingdom) A Murray	6	6	6

=== Bottom half ===
==== Section 5 ====
First round
6	(Czech Republic) T Berdych	6	6	6
Q	(Italy) M Crugnola	4	0	2
(Germany) P Kohlschreiber	1	4	7^{8}	6	6
(Germany) T Kamke	6	6	6^{6}	4	4
WC	(United States) R Harrison	4	3	4
(France) A Mannarino	6	6	6
Q	(Canada) F Dancevic	3	4	4
28	(France) R Gasquet	6	6	6
23	(Russia) N Davydenko	3	6	6^{4}	4
(Germany) F Mayer	6	4	7^{7}	6
(Italy) F Fognini	1	4	7^{7}	4
(Japan) K Nishikori	6	6	6^{4}	6
(Germany) M Zverev	3	1	4
(Serbia) J Tipsarević	6	6	6
(Germany) R Schüttler	1	3	2
9	(Spain) F Verdasco	6	6	6

Second round
6	(Czech Republic) T Berdych	4	6	6	6
(Germany) P Kohlschreiber	6	2	3	4
(France) A Mannarino	3	6^{4}	4
28	(France) R Gasquet	6	7^{7}	6
(Germany) F Mayer	4	3	6	3
(Japan) K Nishikori	6	6	0	6
(Serbia) J Tipsarević	6	6	4	6^{0}	0
9	(Spain) F Verdasco	2	4	6	7^{7}	6

Third round
6	(Czech Republic) T Berdych	6	7^{7}	6
28	(France) R Gasquet	2	6^{3}	2
(Japan) K Nishikori	2	4	3
9	(Spain) F Verdasco	6	6	6

Fourth round
6	(Czech Republic) T Berdych	6	6	6
9	(Spain) F Verdasco	4	2	3

==== Section 6 ====
First round
14	(Spain) N Almagro	6	6	6^{4}	7
Q	(France) S Robert	4	3	7^{7}	5
(Russia) I Andreev	6	7^{7}	6
(Italy) F Volandri	3	6^{3}	3
Q	(Italy) F Cipolla	1	5	1
WC	(France) B Paire	6	7	6
WC	(Australia) P Luczak	3	3	6^{2}
17	(Croatia) I Ljubičić	6	6	7^{7}
29	(Serbia) V Troicki	6	3	6	6
PR	(Russia) D Tursunov	2	6	2	0
(Argentina) B Dabul	3	4	4
Q	(France) N Mahut	6	6	6
(Croatia) I Karlović	4	6	7^{7}	4	4
(Croatia) I Dodig	6	3	6^{5}	6	6
(Spain) M Granollers	1	3	1
3	(Serbia) N Djokovic	6	6	6

Second round
14	(Spain) N Almagro	7	2	4	7^{12}	7
(Russia) I Andreev	5	6	6	6^{10}	5
WC	(France) B Paire	3	7^{7}	4	6^{5}
17	(Croatia) I Ljubičić	6	6^{2}	6	7^{7}
29	(Serbia) V Troicki	6	6	1	6
Q	(France) N Mahut	4	2	6	3
(Croatia) I Dodig	5	7^{10}	0	2
3	(Serbia) N Djokovic	7	6^{8}	6	6

Third round
14	(Spain) N Almagro	6	7^{10}	6
17	(Croatia) I Ljubičić	4	6^{8}	3
29	(Serbia) V Troicki	2	0^{r}
3	(Serbia) N Djokovic	6	0

Fourth round
14	(Spain) N Almagro	3	4	0
3	(Serbia) N Djokovic	6	6	6

==== Section 7 ====
First round
8	(United States) A Roddick	6	6	6
(Czech Republic) J Hájek	1	2	2
(Poland) M Przysiężny	7^{7}	4	4	6^{6}
(Russia) I Kunitsyn	6^{1}	6	6	7^{8}
(Argentina) C Berlocq	4	3	6^{5}
(Netherlands) R Haase	6	6	7^{7}
LL	(Germany) S Greul	6^{5}	6^{4}	2
26	(Argentina) J Mónaco	7^{7}	7^{7}	6
19	(Switzerland) S Wawrinka	7^{7}	6	6
(Russia) T Gabashvili	6^{3}	4	4
Q	(Bulgaria) G Dimitrov	6	6	6
(Kazakhstan) A Golubev	1	4	2
(Portugal) F Gil	6	6^{7}	4	6	9
(Uruguay) P Cuevas	4	7^{9}	6	3	7
(Netherlands) T de Bakker	7^{7}	6	5	2	1
12	(France) G Monfils	6^{5}	2	7	6	6

Second round
8	(United States) A Roddick	7^{9}	6	6
(Russia) I Kunitsyn	6^{7}	2	3
(Netherlands) R Haase	6	6	3	6
26	(Argentina) J Mónaco	4	4	6	2
19	(Switzerland) S Wawrinka	7	6	6
Q	(Bulgaria) G Dimitrov	5	3	3
(Portugal) F Gil	4	3	6	2
12	(France) G Monfils	6	6	1	6

Third round
8	(United States) A Roddick	2	7^{7}	6	6
(Netherlands) R Haase	6	6^{2}	2	2
19	(Switzerland) S Wawrinka	7^{7}	6	6
12	(France) G Monfils	6^{4}	2	3

Fourth round
8	(United States) A Roddick	3	4	4
19	(Switzerland) S Wawrinka	6	6	6

==== Section 8 ====
First round
16	(United States) M Fish	2	4	6	7	6
(Romania) V Hănescu	6	6	3	5	3
(Spain) T Robredo	7^{7}	6	6
WC	(India) S Devvarman	6^{4}	3	4
(Ukraine) S Stakhovsky	6	6	6
(Germany) D Brands	2	3	4
(Poland) Ł Kubot	5	6	3	6	8
18	(United States) S Querrey	7	2	6	1	6
25	(Spain) A Montañés	6	6	3	2	7
(Germany) D Brown	4	2	6	6	5
(Spain) P Andújar	1	2	6^{3}
(Belgium) X Malisse	6	6	7^{7}
(Chinese Taipei) Y-h Lu	7^{7}	2	4	2
(France) G Simon	6^{3}	6	6	6
(Slovakia) L Lacko	1	1	3
2	(Switzerland) R Federer	6	6	6

Second round
16	(United States) M Fish	6	3	3	3
(Spain) T Robredo	1	6	6	6
(Ukraine) S Stakhovsky	6	6	6
(Poland) Ł Kubot	3	4	4
25	(Spain) A Montañés	4	0	1
(Belgium) X Malisse	6	6	6
(France) G Simon	2	3	6	6	3
2	(Switzerland) R Federer	6	6	4	4	6

Third round
(Spain) T Robredo	5	6	6	6
(Ukraine) S Stakhovsky	7	2	4	2
(Belgium) X Malisse	3	3	1
2	(Switzerland) R Federer	6	6	6

Fourth round
(Spain) T Robredo	3	6	3	2
2	(Switzerland) R Federer	6	3	6	6

Preceded by 2010 US Open – Men's singles	Grand Slam men's singles	Succeeded by 2011 French Open – Men's singles
