= 2011 Australian Open – Wheelchair women's singles =

Wheelchair women's singles
- 2011 Australian Open

Final
- Champion: (Netherlands) Esther Vergeer
- Runner-up: (Australia) Daniela di Toro
- Score: 6–0, 6–0

Events
Singles	men	women		boys	girls
Doubles	men	women	mixed	boys	girls
WC Singles	men	women	quad
WC Doubles	men	women	quad
Legends	men	women	mixed
- Australian Open

Esther Vergeer defeated Daniela di Toro in the final, 6–0, 6–0 to win the women's singles wheelchair tennis title at the 2011 Australian Open. It was her eighth Australian Open singles title and 17th major singles overall. It also marked the fourth time that Vergeer did not drop a game during a major final, and she only lost four games en route to the title. The win in the final was her 404th consecutive match win.

Korie Homan was the reigning champion, but did not participate this year due to injury.

The 2011 Australian Open – Wheelchair Women's Singles was a tennis tournament featuring 8 paraplegic women tennis players, which was part of the NEC Tour. The tournament took place at Melbourne Park in Melbourne, Australia, from 17 January to 30 January, it was the 9th edition of the Australian Open women's wheelchair event and the first Grand Slam event of 2011. The tournament was played on Plexicushion Prestige AO hard courts, which were rated a medium-fast pace by the ITF. The competition was organised by the International Tennis Federation and Tennis Australia.

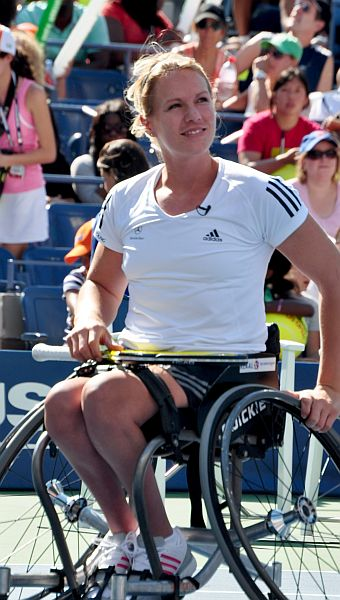
Esther Vergeer claimed her 17th major singles title.

== Tournament ==
On her Grand Slam debut Marjolein Buis won in three sets against Annick Sevenans to reach the semifinals. Also into the semifinals were World number one Esther Vergeer who recorded her 402nd consecutive match win with a 6–0, 6–0 win over her doubles partner, Sharon Walraven. Buis then took on World number two and home favourite Daniela di Toro who lost just three games on Australia Day against Aniek van Koot. While Jiske Griffioen would play Vergeer in the semifinals after defeating Grand Slam debutant Jordanne Whiley in straight sets. The semifinals witnessed di Toro and Vergeer make the final with straight sets wins. In the final Vergeer claimed her eighth Australian Open title as she defeated di Toro without losing a game to chalk up her 404th consecutive win.

=== Results ===
Key

- Q = Qualifier
- WC = Wild card
- LL = Lucky loser
- Alt = Alternate
- ITF = ITF entry
- PR = Protected ranking
- SR = Special ranking
- SE = Special exempt
- JE = Junior exempt
- JR = Junior Accelerator Programme entrant
- CO = College Accelerator Programme entrant
- NG = Next Gen Accelerator Program entrant
- w/o = Walkover
- r = Retired
- d = Defaulted

=== Seeds ===
1. (Netherlands) Esther Vergeer (champion)
2. (Australia) Daniela di Toro (final)

=== Draw ===
Quarterfinals
1	(Netherlands) Esther Vergeer	6	6
(Netherlands) Sharon Walraven	0	0
(United Kingdom) Jordanne Whiley	4	1
(Netherlands) Jiske Griffioen	6	6
(Netherlands) Marjolein Buis	5	6	6
(Belgium) Annick Sevenans	7	3	2
(Netherlands) Aniek van Koot	3	0
2	(Australia) Daniela di Toro	6	6

Semifinals
1	(Netherlands) Esther Vergeer	6	6
(Netherlands) Jiske Griffioen	2	2
(Netherlands) Marjolein Buis	3	2
2	(Australia) Daniela di Toro	6	6

Final
1	(Netherlands) Esther Vergeer	6	6
2	(Australia) Daniela di Toro	0	0
