= 2011 Australian Open – Wheelchair women's doubles =

Wheelchair women's doubles
- 2011 Australian Open

Final
- Champion: (Netherlands) Esther Vergeer (Netherlands) Sharon Walraven
- Runner-up: (Netherlands) Aniek van Koot (Netherlands) Jiske Griffioen
- Score: 6–0, 6–2

Events
Singles	men	women		boys	girls
Doubles	men	women	mixed	boys	girls
WC Singles	men	women	quad
WC Doubles	men	women	quad
Legends	men	women	mixed
← 2010 ·	Australian Open	· 2012 →

Esther Vergeer and Sharon Walraven defeated the defending champion Aniek van Koot and her partner Jiske Griffioen in the final, 6–0, 6–2 to win the women's doubles wheelchair tennis title at the 2011 Australian Open. It was their first step towards an eventual Grand Slam.

Florence Gravellier and van Koot were the reigning champions, but Gravellier did not participate.

== Seeds ==
1. (Netherlands) Esther Vergeer / (Netherlands) Sharon Walraven (champions)
2. (Netherlands) Aniek van Koot / (Netherlands) Jiske Griffioen (final)

== Draw ==
=== Key ===
- Q = Qualifier
- WC = Wild card
- LL = Lucky loser
- Alt = Alternate
- ITF = ITF entry
- PR = Protected ranking
- SR = Special ranking
- SE = Special exempt
- JE = Junior exempt
- JR = Junior Accelerator Programme entrant
- CO = College Accelerator Programme entrant
- NG = Next Gen Accelerator Program entrant
- w/o = Walkover
- r = Retired
- d = Defaulted

=== Finals ===
Semifinals
1	(Netherlands) Esther Vergeer (Netherlands) Sharon Walraven	6	7^{7}
(United Kingdom) Jordanne Whiley (Australia) Daniela Di Toro	3	6^{2}
(Netherlands) Marjolein Buis (Belgium) Annick Sevenans	6^{4}	6^{5}
2	(Netherlands) Aniek van Koot (Netherlands) Jiske Griffioen	7^{7}	7^{7}

Final
1	(Netherlands) Esther Vergeer (Netherlands) Sharon Walraven	6	6
2	(Netherlands) Aniek van Koot (Netherlands) Jiske Griffioen	0	2
