= 2011 Australian Open – Girls' doubles =

Girls' doubles
- 2011 Australian Open

Final
- Champions: (Belgium) An-Sophie Mestach (Netherlands) Demi Schuurs
- Runners-up: (Japan) Eri Hozumi (Japan) Miyu Kato
- Score: 6–2, 6–3

Events
Singles	men	women		boys	girls
Doubles	men	women	mixed	boys	girls
WC Singles	men	women	quad
WC Doubles	men	women	quad
Legends	men	women	mixed
- Australian Open

Slovak pair Jana Čepelová and Chantal Škamlová were the defending champions. They defeated Tímea Babos and Gabriela Dabrowski in the 2010 final, but chose to not start this year.

An-Sophie Mestach and Demi Schuurs won the title, defeating Eri Hozumi and Miyu Kato in the final, 6–2, 6–3.

== Seeds ==
1. (Russia) Irina Khromacheva / (Russia) Yulia Putintseva (quarterfinals)
2. (Canada) Eugenie Bouchard / (Puerto Rico) Monica Puig (second round)
3. (Serbia) Natalija Kostić / (Belarus) Ilona Kremen (semifinals)
4. (Russia) Margarita Gasparyan / (Russia) Daria Gavrilova (quarterfinals)
5. (Slovenia) Nastja Kolar / (Montenegro) Danka Kovinić (second round)
6. (Belgium) An-Sophie Mestach / (Netherlands) Demi Schuurs (champions)
7. (China) Tang Haochen / (China) Tian Ran (second round)
8. (Slovakia) Lucia Butkovská / (Slovakia) Anna Karolína Schmiedlová (quarterfinals)

== Draw ==
Key

- Q = Qualifier
- WC = Wild card
- LL = Lucky loser
- Alt = Alternate
- ITF = ITF entry
- PR = Protected ranking
- SR = Special ranking
- SE = Special exempt
- JE = Junior exempt
- JR = Junior Accelerator Programme entrant
- CO = College Accelerator Programme entrant
- NG = Next Gen Accelerator Program entrant
- w/o = Walkover
- r = Retired
- d = Defaulted

=== Finals ===
Semifinals
6	(Belgium) An-Sophie Mestach (Netherlands) Demi Schuurs	7	3	[10]
3	(Serbia) Natalija Kostić (Belarus) Ilona Kremen	6^{2}	6	[1]
(Japan) Eri Hozumi (Japan) Miyu Kato	6	6
(Czech Republic) Denisa Allertová (Czech Republic) Klára Fabíková	2	4

Final
6	(Belgium) An-Sophie Mestach (Netherlands) Demi Schuurs	6	6
(Japan) Eri Hozumi (Japan) Miyu Kato	2	3

=== Top half ===
First round
1	(Russia) Irina Khromacheva (Russia) Yulia Putintseva	6	6
WC	(Australia) Ebony Panoho (Australia) Belinda Woolcock	1	3
(China) Deng Mengning (China) Dong Xiaorong	2	3
(Japan) Mana Ayukawa (Japan) Riko Sawayanagi	6	6
WC	(Australia) Molly Polak (Australia) Brooke Rischbieth	4	4
(Uzbekistan) Nigina Abduraimova (Lithuania) Lina Padegimaitė	6	6
(Belarus) Aliaksandra Sasnovich (Belarus) Natallia Vavulina	2	0
6	(Belgium) An-Sophie Mestach (Netherlands) Demi Schuurs	6	6
3	(Serbia) Natalija Kostić (Belarus) Ilona Kremen	6	6
(Japan) Maho Kowase (Japan) Risa Ozaki	3	1
(Sweden) Ellen Allgurin (United States) Christina Makarova	4	6	[4]
(Romania) Ingrid Radu (Japan) Kanami Tsuji	6	2	[10]
WC	(Australia) Samantha Harris (Australia) Stefani Stojic	2	4
(Japan) Ayaka Okuno (Uzbekistan) Sabina Sharipova	6	6
(Australia) Ashleigh Barty (New Caledonia) Anaève Pain	7	6	[5]
5	(Slovenia) Nastja Kolar (Montenegro) Danka Kovinić	6	7	[10]

Second round
1	(Russia) I Khromacheva (Russia) Y Putintseva	6	6
(Japan) M Ayukawa (Japan) R Sawayanagi	4	1
(Uzbekistan) N Abduraimova (Lithuania) L Padegimaitė	0	0
6	(Belgium) A-S Mestach (Netherlands) D Schuurs	6	6
3	(Serbia) N Kostić (Belarus) I Kremen	6	6
(Romania) I Radu (Japan) K Tsuji	3	4
(Japan) A Okuno (Uzbekistan) S Sharipova	6	6
5	(Slovenia) N Kolar (Montenegro) D Kovinić	4	4

Quarterfinals
1	(Russia) I Khromacheva (Russia) Y Putintseva	1	2
6	(Belgium) A-S Mestach (Netherlands) D Schuurs	6	6
3	(Serbia) N Kostić (Belarus) I Kremen	7	6
(Japan) A Okuno (Uzbekistan) S Sharipova	5	2

Semifinals
6	(Belgium) A-S Mestach (Netherlands) D Schuurs	7	3	[10]
3	(Serbia) N Kostić (Belarus) I Kremen	6^{2}	6	[1]

=== Bottom half ===
First round
7	(China) Tang Haochen (China) Tian Ran	6	6
(Ukraine) Ganna Poznikhirenko (Russia) Ekaterina Semenova	3	4
(Japan) Eri Hozumi (Japan) Miyu Kato	6	6
(Belarus) Viktoryia Kisialeva (United Kingdom) Jennifer Ren	2	1
(Hungary) Krisztina Kapitány (India) Rishika Sunkara	4	6	[3]
WC	(Australia) Kassandra Dunser (Australia) Azra Hadzic	6	4	[10]
(South Korea) Jang Su-jeong (South Korea) Lee So-ra	5	4
4	(Russia) Margarita Gasparyan (Russia) Daria Gavrilova	7	6
8	(Slovakia) Lucia Butkovská (Slovakia) Anna Karolína Schmiedlová	3	6	[10]
(New Zealand) Emily Fanning (Japan) Nao Hibino	6	3	[2]
(Japan) Rio Kitagawa (Thailand) Luksika Kumkhum	2	5
(China) Yang Zhaoxuan (China) Zhu Lin	6	7
(Czech Republic) Denisa Allertová (Czech Republic) Klára Fabíková	3	6	10
(Japan) Emi Mutaguchi (Japan) Makoto Ninomiya	6	3	2
(Australia) Abbie Myers (Australia) Storm Sanders	3	3
2	(Canada) Eugenie Bouchard (Puerto Rico) Monica Puig	6	6

Second round
7	(China) H Tang (China) R Tian	3	3
(Japan) E Hozumi (Japan) M Kato	6	6
WC	(Australia) K Dunser (Australia) A Hadzic	4	4
4	(Russia) M Gasparyan (Russia) D Gavrilova	6	6
8	(Slovakia) L Butkovská (Slovakia) AK Schmiedlová	7	6
(China) Z Yang (China) L Zhu	5	2
(Czech Republic) D Allertová (Czech Republic) K Fabíková	6	6
2	(Canada) E Bouchard (Puerto Rico) M Puig	0	3

Quarterfinals
(Japan) E Hozumi (Japan) M Kato	2	6	[10]
4	(Russia) M Gasparyan (Russia) D Gavrilova	6	4	[6]
8	(Slovakia) L Butkovská (Slovakia) AK Schmiedlová	1	0
(Czech Republic) D Allertová (Czech Republic) K Fabíková	6	6

Semifinals
(Japan) E Hozumi (Japan) M Kato	6	6
(Czech Republic) D Allertová (Czech Republic) K Fabíková	2	4
