= Darius Florin Brăguși =

Romanian tennis player

- Country (sports): Romania
- Born: 18 June 1993 (age 32) Râmnicu Vâlcea, Romania
- Prize money: US$3,722

Singles
- Career record: 0–1
- Career titles: 0
- Highest ranking: No. 936 (30 January 2012)
- Current ranking: No. 942 (2 April 2012)

Doubles
- Career record: 0–0
- Career titles: 0
- Highest ranking: N/A
- Current ranking: NR
- Last updated on: 2 April 2012.

Darius Florin Brăguși (born 18 June 1993) is a Romanian professional tennis player playing on the ITF Men's Circuit and current member of the Romania Davis Cup Team. On 30 January 2012 he reached his highest ATP singles ranking of 936.

== Davis Cup ==
=== Singles performances (0–1) ===
Edition	Round	Date	Against	Surface	Opponent	Win/Lose	Result
2012 Europe/Africa Zone Group I	2R	6–8 April 2012	Netherlands	Hard (i)	(Netherlands) Thomas Schoorel	Lose	2–6, 2–6
