= Sophie Letcher =

Australian tennis player

- Country (sports): Australia
- Residence: Gold Coast, Australia
- Born: 29 November 1992 (age 32); Melbourne, Australia
- Height: 1.65 m (5 ft 5 in)
- Plays: Right handed
- Prize money: $32,161

Singles
- Career record: 38-42
- Highest ranking: No. 253 (18 April 2011)

Grand Slam singles results
- Australian Open: Q2 (2011)

Doubles
- Career record: 13-34
- Highest ranking: 367 (20 June 2011)

Grand Slam doubles results
- Australian Open: 1R (2011)

Sophie Letcher (born 29 November 1992) is an Australian tennis player. She started with tennis at the age of three, inspired by her two older brothers and parents, who also played tennis She is the daughter of the late Cliff Letcher, who achieved some success in playing doubles. She competed at the 2011 Australian Open in the women's doubles with Viktorija Rajicic, but lost in the opening round.

== ITF Circuit finals ==
=== Singles: 1 (0–1) ===
Legend
$100,000 tournaments
$75,000 tournaments
$50,000 tournaments
$25,000 tournaments
$15,000 tournaments
$10,000 tournaments

Outcome	No.	Date	Tournament	Surface	Opponent	Score
Runner-up	1.	26 April 2010	Ipswich, Australia	Clay	(Australia) Sally Peers	4–6, 3–6
