= 2011 Camparini Gioielli Cup – Trofeo Pompea – Doubles =

Trofeo Pompea – Doubles
- 2011 Camparini Gioielli Cup – Trofeo Pompea

Final
- Champion: (Australia) Sophie Ferguson (Australia) Sally Peers
- Runner-up: (Italy) Claudia Giovine (Argentina) María Irigoyen
- Score: 6–4, 6–1

Events
Singles	Doubles
← 2010 ·	Camparini Gioielli Cup – Trofeo Pompea	· 2012 →

This was a new event to the ITF Women's Circuit in 2011.
Sophie Ferguson and Sally Peers defeated Claudia Giovine and María Irigoyen in the final 6–4, 6–1.

== Seeds ==
1. (New Zealand) Marina Erakovic / (United States) Sloane Stephens (quarterfinals)
2. (Russia) Ekaterina Bychkova / (Russia) Vitalia Diatchenko (semifinals)
3. (Italy) Claudia Giovine / (Argentina) María Irigoyen (final)
4. (Australia) Sophie Ferguson / (Australia) Sally Peers (champions)

== Draw ==
=== Key ===
- Q = Qualifier
- WC = Wild card
- LL = Lucky loser
- Alt = Alternate
- SE = Special exempt
- PR = Protected ranking
- ITF = ITF entry
- JE = Junior exempt
- w/o = Walkover
- r = Retired
- d = Defaulted
- SR = Special ranking

=== Draw ===
First round
(Germany) S Lisicki (Croatia) A Tomljanović	6	6
(Italy) E Mayr (Italy) J Mayr	0	3
3	(Italy) C Giovine (Argentina) M Irigoyen	6	6
(Italy) G Sussarello (Italy) S Sussarello	3	0
(Romania) A Cadanţu (Romania) E Dabija	6	6
(Romania) D Enache (Romania) L Ungur	0	3
(Peru) B Botto (Russia) E Ivanova	1	4
(Denmark) K Barbat (Netherlands) L Kerkhove	6	6
(Italy) G Gatto-Monticone (Italy) F Quercia	3	6	[8]
4	(Australia) S Ferguson (Australia) S Peers	6	4	[10]
(Colombia) C Castaño (Austria) S Klemenschits	2	4
(Netherlands) D Harmsen (Russia) M Melnikova	6	6

Quarterfinals
1	(New Zealand) M Erakovic (United States) S Stephens	6^{3}	3
(Germany) S Lisicki (Croatia) A Tomljanović	7	6
3	(Italy) C Giovine (Argentina) M Irigoyen	w/o
(Romania) A Cadanţu (Romania) E Dabija
(Denmark) K Barbat (Netherlands) L Kerkhove	1	4
4	(Australia) S Ferguson (Australia) S Peers	6	6
(Netherlands) D Harmsen (Russia) M Melnikova	6	5	[3]
2	(Russia) E Bychkova (Russia) V Diatchenko	2	7	[10]

Semifinals
(Germany) S Lisicki (Croatia) A Tomljanović	6	3	[6]
3	(Italy) C Giovine (Argentina) M Irigoyen	4	6	[10]
4	(Australia) S Ferguson (Australia) S Peers	6	6
2	(Russia) E Bychkova (Russia) V Diatchenko	1	4

Final
3	(Italy) C Giovine (Argentina) M Irigoyen	4	1
4	(Australia) S Ferguson (Australia) S Peers	6	6
