= 2011 Camparini Gioielli Cup – Trofeo Pompea – Singles =

Trofeo Pompea – Singles
- 2011 Camparini Gioielli Cup – Trofeo Pompea

Final
- Champion: (United States) Sloane Stephens
- Runner-up: (Belarus) Anastasiya Yakimova
- Score: 6–3, 6–1

Events
Singles	Doubles
← 2010 ·	Camparini Gioielli Cup – Trofeo Pompea	· 2012 →

This is a new event to the ITF Women's Circuit in 2011.
Sloane Stephens defeated Anastasiya Yakimova in the final 6–3, 6–1.

== Seeds ==
1. (Belarus) Anastasiya Yakimova (final)
2. (Germany) Sabine Lisicki (semifinals)
3. (Australia) Sophie Ferguson (quarterfinals)
4. (France) Olivia Sanchez (first round)
5. (Australia) Sally Peers (first round)
6. (United States) Sloane Stephens (champion)
7. (Switzerland) Stefanie Vögele (second round)
8. (Luxembourg) Mandy Minella (second round)

== Draw ==
=== Key ===
- Q = Qualifier
- WC = Wild card
- LL = Lucky loser
- Alt = Alternate
- SE = Special exempt
- PR = Protected ranking
- ITF = ITF entry
- JE = Junior exempt
- w/o = Walkover
- r = Retired
- d = Defaulted
- SR = Special ranking

=== Finals ===
Semifinals
1	(Belarus) Anastasiya Yakimova	7	4	6
(Russia) Ekaterina Ivanova	5	6	1
6	(United States) Sloane Stephens	6	6
2	(Germany) Sabine Lisicki	3	3

Final
1	(Belarus) Anastasiya Yakimova	3	1
6	(United States) Sloane Stephens	6	6

=== Top half ===
First round
1	(Belarus) A Yakimova	6	6
(Colombia) C Castaño	2	3
(Georgia (country)) M Chakhnashvili	6	6
Q	(Germany) A Schäfer	2	2
(Italy) A Floris	5	6	6
WC	(Puerto Rico) M Puig	7	4	4
(Croatia) A Tomljanović	7	6
5	(Australia) S Peers	6^{4}	1
3	(Australia) S Ferguson	6	7
WC	(Italy) G Gatto-Monticone	1	5
(Russia) V Diatchenko	6	5	3
LL	(Italy) ME Camerin	4	7	6
(Russia) E Ivanova	6	2	6
(Spain) L Arruabarrena-Vecino	3	6	2
(Romania) IR Olaru	3	5
8	(Luxembourg) M Minella	6	7

Second round
1	(Belarus) A Yakimova	6	4	6
(Georgia (country)) M Chakhnashvili	4	6	2
(Italy) A Floris	2	0
(Croatia) A Tomljanović	6	6
3	(Australia) S Ferguson	6	6
LL	(Italy) ME Camerin	2	2
(Russia) E Ivanova	6	7
8	(Luxembourg) M Minella	1	5

Quarterfinals
1	(Belarus) A Yakimova	6	4	6
(Croatia) A Tomljanović	2	6	4
3	(Australia) S Ferguson	6	5	1
(Russia) E Ivanova	3	7	6

Semifinals
1	(Belarus) A Yakimova	7	4	6
(Russia) E Ivanova	5	6	1

=== Bottom half ===
First round
6	(United States) S Stephens	6	2	6
WC	(Italy) F Quercia	4	6	2
(France) L Thorpe	6	7
Q	(Italy) C Giovine	3	5
Q	(Brazil) A-C Duarte	6	2	4
(Romania) L Ungur	4	6	6
LL	(Italy) E Mayr	6	6^{3}	6
4	(France) O Sanchez	4	7	2
7	(Switzerland) S Vögele	2	6	6
(Argentina) M Irigoyen	6	3	1
(New Zealand) M Erakovic	6	7
(Germany) L Siegemund	4	5
(Romania) A Cadanţu	6	6
(Russia) E Bychkova	4	3
Q	(Germany) S Haas	0	1
2	(Germany) S Lisicki	6	6

Second round
6	(United States) S Stephens	6	6
(France) L Thorpe	2	4
(Romania) L Ungur	6	7
LL	(Italy) E Mayr	3	6^{3}
7	(Switzerland) S Vögele	3	4
(New Zealand) M Erakovic	6	6
(Romania) A Cadanţu	2	1	r
2	(Germany) S Lisicki	6	3

Quarterfinals
6	(United States) S Stephens	7	7
(Romania) L Ungur	5	6^{3}
(New Zealand) M Erakovic	3	7	2
2	(Germany) S Lisicki	6	5	6

Semifinals
6	(United States) S Stephens	6	6
2	(Germany) S Lisicki	3	3
