= 2011 Camparini Gioielli Cup – Trofeo Pompea =

- Date: May 9 – 15
- Edition: 1st
- Location: Reggio Emilia, Italy

Champions

Singles
- (United States) Sloane Stephens

Doubles
- (Australia) Sophie Ferguson / (Australia) Sally Peers
Camparini Gioielli Cup – Trofeo Pompea

The 2011 Camparini Gioielli Cup – Trofeo pompea was a professional tennis tournament played on outdoor clay courts. It was part of the 2011 ITF Women's Circuit. It took place in Reggio Emilia, Italy between 9 and 15 May 2011.

== WTA entrants ==
=== Seeds ===
Country	Player	Rank^{1}	Seed
BLR	Anastasiya Yakimova	103	1
GER	Sabine Lisicki	132	2
AUS	Sophie Ferguson	136	3
FRA	Olivia Sanchez	142	4
AUS	Sally Peers	148	5
USA	Sloane Stephens	151	6
SUI	Stefanie Vögele	152	7
LUX	Mandy Minella	153	8

- Rankings are as of May 2, 2011.

=== Other entrants ===
The following players received wildcards into the singles main draw:

- (Peru) Bianca Botto
- (Italy) Giulia Gatto-Monticone
- (Puerto Rico) Monica Puig
- (Italy) Federica Quercia

The following players received entry from the qualifying draw:

- (Brazil) Ana Clara Duarte
- (Italy) Claudia Giovine
- (Germany) Sina Haas
- (Germany) Anne Schäfer

The following players received entry by a lucky loser spot:

- (Italy) Maria Elena Camerin
- (Italy) Evelyn Mayr

== Champions ==
=== Singles ===
(United States) Sloane Stephens def. (Belarus) Anastasiya Yakimova, 6–3, 6–1

=== Doubles ===
(Australia) Sophie Ferguson / (Australia) Sally Peers def. (Italy) Claudia Giovine / (Argentina) María Irigoyen, 6–4, 6–1.
