= 2011 Australian Open =

- Date: 17–30 January 2011
- Edition: 99th
- Category: Grand Slam (ITF)
- Surface: Hard (Plexicushion)
- Location: Melbourne, Victoria, Australia
- Venue: Melbourne Park

Champions

Men's singles
- (Serbia) Novak Djokovic

Women's singles
- (Belgium) Kim Clijsters

Men's doubles
- (United States) Bob Bryan / (United States) Mike Bryan

Women's doubles
- (Argentina) Gisela Dulko / (Italy) Flavia Pennetta

Mixed doubles
- (Slovenia) Katarina Srebotnik / (Canada) Daniel Nestor

Wheelchair men's singles
- (Japan) Shingo Kunieda

Wheelchair women's singles
- (Netherlands) Esther Vergeer

Wheelchair quad singles
- (United States) David Wagner

Wheelchair men's doubles
- (Netherlands) Maikel Scheffers / (Japan) Shingo Kunieda

Wheelchair women's doubles
- (Netherlands) Esther Vergeer / (Netherlands) Sharon Walraven

Wheelchair quad doubles
- (United Kingdom) Andy Lapthorne / (United Kingdom) Peter Norfolk

Boys' singles
- (Czech Republic) Jiří Veselý

Girls' singles
- (Belgium) An-Sophie Mestach

Boys' doubles
- (Slovakia) Filip Horanský / (Czech Republic) Jiří Veselý

Girls' doubles
- (Belgium) An-Sophie Mestach / (Netherlands) Demi Schuurs
- Australian Open

The 2011 Australian Open was a tennis tournament featuring six different competitions, and part of the 2011 ATP World Tour, the 2011 WTA Tour, the ITF Junior Tour, and the NEC Tour, as tournaments for professional, junior, and wheelchair players were held. The tournament took place at Melbourne Park in Melbourne, Australia from 17 to 30 January, it was the 99th edition of the Australian Open and the first Grand Slam event of 2011. The tournament was played on hardcourts and was organised by the International Tennis Federation and Tennis Australia.

Roger Federer was unsuccessful in his title defence, being defeated by Novak Djokovic in the semi-finals, and Serena Williams was unable to defend her title due to a foot injury she suffered shortly after winning Wimbledon last year. Djokovic won the Australian Open for the second time, and Kim Clijsters, the runner-up to Justine Henin-Hardenne in 2004, won her maiden Australian Open. In the men's doubles the Bryan brothers won their fifth Australian Open while Gisela Dulko and Flavia Pennetta won their maiden Grand Slam title in the women's doubles. Daniel Nestor claimed his second mixed doubles Grand Slam alongside Katarina Srebotnik who won her fourth mixed title, her first Australian, leaving her one away from a career Grand Slam, as she has now won three of the Grand Slams, needing just Wimbledon to complete her collection.

In the junior tournaments both the singles and doubles titles in the boys' and girls' events were won by Jiří Veselý and An-Sophie Mestach. Vesely won the doubles alongside Filip Horanský whilst Mestach won her doubles crown with Demi Schuurs. Vesely and Mestach won their first Grand Slam titles and became the first players to achieve the junior double together in any Grand Slam since Kristian Pless and Virginie Razzano achieved this at the 1999 Australian Open.

Shingo Kunieda and Esther Vergeer both won the singles and doubles in the men's and women's wheelchair tennis events respectively. Kunieda won his fourth consecutive Australian Open, his fifth overall. In the doubles Kunieda was partnered to the title by Maikel Scheffers. Vergeer's singles win was her eighth Australian Open crown, her seventeenth overall, and the fourth time that she has not lost a game during a Grand Slam final. The win in the final was her 404th consecutive match win, she was partnered by Sharon Walraven in the doubles. In the Quad events David Wagner won the singles while Andy Lapthorne and Peter Norfolk took the doubles crown.

== Tournament ==
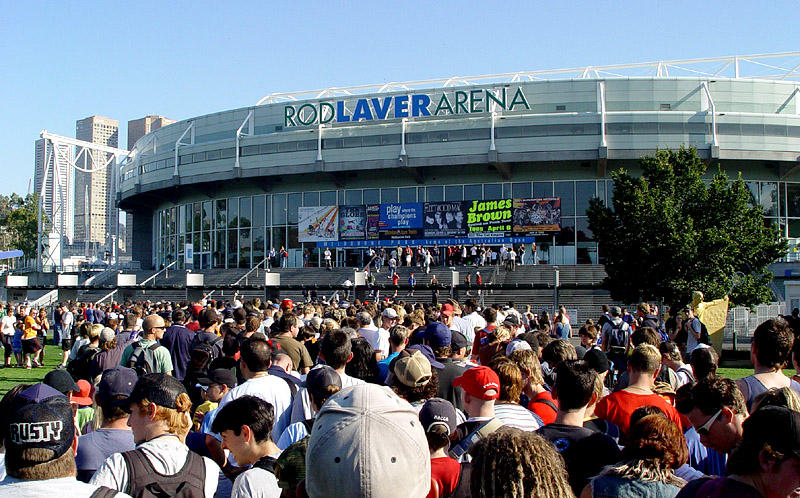
Rod Laver Arena where the Finals of the Australian Open took place.

The 2011 Australian Open was the 99th edition of the Australian Open, held at Melbourne Park, in Melbourne, Victoria. The tournament was an event run by the International Tennis Federation (ITF) and Tennis Australia, that was part of the 2011 ATP World Tour and the 2011 WTA Tour calendars, under the Grand Slam category. The tournament consisted of men's and women's singles and doubles draws as well as a mixed doubles event. There were also singles and doubles events for boys and girls (players under 18), part of the Grade A category of tournaments of the junior tour. There were also events for wheelchair tennis players, they competed in two categories: Paraplegic players where men and women play in separate competitions and a category for Quadriplegics, shortened to Quads and is a mixed event. These competitions are part of the NEC tour, under the Grand Slam category. The tournament was played on Plexicushion Prestige AO hard courts, which were rated a medium-fast pace by the ITF. The tournament took place over twenty-five courts, including three showcourts: the Hisense Arena, the Margaret Court Arena and the Rod Laver Arena (the Hisense and Rod Laver Arenas have roofs which allow play to continue indoors should the roof be needed).

== Points and prize money ==
=== Point distribution ===
Below is a series of tables for each of the competitions showing the ranking points on offer for each event.

==== Senior points ====
| Stage | Men's singles | Men's doubles | Women's singles | Women's doubles |
|---|---|---|---|---|
| Champion | 2000 | | | |
| Runner up | 1200 | | 1400 | |
| Semifinals | 720 | | 900 | |
| Quarterfinals | 360 | | 500 | |
| Round of 16 | 180 | | 280 | |
| Round of 32 | 90 | | 160 | |
| Round of 64 | 45 | 0 | 100 | 5 |
| Round of 128 | 10 | – | 5 | – |
| Qualifier | 25 | – | 60 | – |
| Qualifying 3rd round | 16 | – | 50 | – |
| Qualifying 2nd round | 8 | – | 40 | – |
| Qualifying 1st round | 0 | – | 2 | – |

==== Junior points ====
| Stage | Boys singles | Boys doubles | Girls singles | Girls doubles |
|---|---|---|---|---|
| Champion | 250 | 180 | 250 | 180 |
| Runner up | 180 | 120 | 180 | 120 |
| Semifinals | 120 | 80 | 120 | 80 |
| Quarterfinals | 80 | 50 | 80 | 50 |
| Round of 16 | 50 | 30 | 50 | 30 |
| Round of 32 | 30 | n/a | 30 | n/a |
| Qualifier who loses in first round | 25 | n/a | 25 | n/a |
| Qualifying Final round | 20 | n/a | 20 | n/a |

==== Wheelchair points ====
| Stage | Men's singles | Men's doubles | Women's singles | Women's doubles | Quad singles | Quad doubles |
|---|---|---|---|---|---|---|
| Champion | 800 | | | | | |
| Runner up | 500 | | | | | 100 |
| Semifinals/3rd | 375 | 100 | 375 | 100 | 375 | n/a |
| Quarterfinals/4th | 100 | n/a | 100 | n/a | 100 | n/a |

=== Prize money ===
The 2011 Australian Open offered record prize money to both men and women of a total of A$25 million (US$24 million), up 3.8% on the total prize money from 2010. The winners of the singles titles took home A$2.2 million (US$2.1 million) with the finalists receiving A$1.1 million (US$1 million). To put it into perspective Kim Clijsters and Rafael Nadal both took home US$1.7 million for winning the 2010 US Open. Below is the list of prize money given to each player in the main draw of the professional competitions; all prize money is in Australian dollars (A$); doubles prize money is distributed per pair.

==== Men's and women's singles ====
- Winners: $2,200,000
- Runners-up: $1,100,000
- Semi-finalists: $420,000
- Quarter-finalists: $210,000
- Fourth round: $93,000
- Third round: $54,500
- Second round: $32,000
- First round: $20,000

==== Men's and women's doubles ====
- Winners: $454,500
- Runners-up: $227,250
- Semi-finalists: $113,000
- Quarter-finalists: $56,000
- Third round: $31,500
- Second round: $17,200
- First round: $9,600

==== Mixed doubles ====
- Winners: $135,500
- Runners-up: $67,500
- Semi-finalists: $33,900
- Quarter-finalists: $15,500
- Second round: $7,800
- First round: $3,800

== Fundraising for the Queensland floods ==
Following widespread flooding in Queensland, several players decided to raise money for the cause. The Association of Tennis Professionals and the Women's Tennis Association donated ten dollars for every ace served during the Australian Open as well as during the two pre-tournament joint events in Brisbane and Sydney. In total, the ATP and WTA raised $51,070.

In Brisbane, Andy Roddick and Sam Stosur pledged a hundred dollars for every ace they hit, which was also matched by Australian player Matthew Ebden when he played in Sydney the following week. Roddick later doubled his pledge to two hundred dollars. In total, Roddick hit fifty four aces, raising just under eleven thousand dollars for his efforts during the Brisbane tournament. In addition to this, the Brisbane International donated another five thousand dollars.

American player Bethanie Mattek-Sands pledged to donate five percent of her prize money from the Hobart International and Australian Open to the cause. The ITF donated $25,000 towards the rebuilding of tennis facilities.

=== Rally for Relief ===
On 16 January, Roger Federer, Rafael Nadal, Kim Clijsters, Novak Djokovic, Lleyton Hewitt, Andy Murray, Andy Roddick, Justine Henin, Ana Ivanovic, Victoria Azarenka, Vera Zvonareva, Caroline Wozniacki and Queenslanders Sam Stosur and Pat Rafter played a charity match at Rod Laver Arena to raise money for the flood efforts. Tickets to the event cost twenty dollars, and other events – such as an auction of shirts signed by the players – also took place. Queensland Energy Resources pledged to match the total amount of money raised. The event raised $1.8 million.

== Singles players ==
Men's singles

| Champion | | Runner-up | |
|---|---|---|---|
| (Serbia) Novak Djokovic [3] | | (United Kingdom) Andy Murray [5] | |
Semifinals out
| (Spain) David Ferrer [7] | | (Switzerland) Roger Federer [2] | |
Quarterfinals out
| (Spain) Rafael Nadal [1] | (Ukraine) Alexandr Dolgopolov | (Czech Republic) Tomáš Berdych [6] | (Switzerland) Stan Wawrinka [19] |
4th round out
| (Croatia) Marin Čilić [15] | (Canada) Milos Raonic (Q) | (Sweden) Robin Söderling [4] | (Austria) Jürgen Melzer [11] |
| (Spain) Fernando Verdasco [9] | (Spain) Nicolás Almagro [14] | (United States) Andy Roddick [8] | (Spain) Tommy Robredo |
3rd round out
| (Australia) Bernard Tomic (WC) | (United States) John Isner [20] | (Russia) Mikhail Youzhny [10] | (Lithuania) Richard Berankis |
| (Czech Republic) Jan Hernych (Q) | (France) Jo-Wilfried Tsonga [13] | (Cyprus) Marcos Baghdatis [21] | (Spain) Guillermo García López [32] |
| (France) Richard Gasquet [28] | (Japan) Kei Nishikori | (Croatia) Ivan Ljubičić [17] | (Serbia) Viktor Troicki [29] |
| (Netherlands) Robin Haase | (France) Gaël Monfils [12] | (Ukraine) Sergiy Stakhovsky | (Belgium) Xavier Malisse |
2nd round out
| (United States) Ryan Sweeting (Q) | (Spain) Feliciano López [31] | (Czech Republic) Radek Štěpánek | (Colombia) Santiago Giraldo |
| (Slovenia) Blaz Kavčič (Q) | (France) Michaël Llodra [22] | (Argentina) David Nalbandian [27] | (United States) Michael Russell |
| (Luxembourg) Gilles Müller (Q) | (Brazil) Thomaz Bellucci [30] | (Germany) Benjamin Becker | (Italy) Andreas Seppi |
| (Spain) Pere Riba | (Argentina) Juan Martín del Potro (PR) | (Argentina) Eduardo Schwank | (Ukraine) Illya Marchenko |
| (Germany) Philipp Kohlschreiber | (France) Adrian Mannarino | (Germany) Florian Mayer | (Serbia) Janko Tipsarević |
| (Russia) Igor Andreev | (France) Benoît Paire (WC) | (France) Nicolas Mahut (Q) | (Croatia) Ivan Dodig |
| (Russia) Igor Kunitsyn | (Argentina) Juan Mónaco [26] | (Bulgaria) Grigor Dimitrov (Q) | (Portugal) Frederico Gil |
| (United States) Mardy Fish [16] | (Poland) Łukasz Kubot | (Spain) Albert Montañés [25] | (France) Gilles Simon |
1st round out
| (Brazil) Marcos Daniel | (Spain) Daniel Gimeno Traver | (France) Jérémy Chardy | (Colombia) Alejandro Falla |
| (France) Florent Serra | (Germany) Denis Gremelmayr (Q) | (Portugal) Rui Machado | (United States) Donald Young (Q) |
| (Turkey) Marsel İlhan | (South Africa) Kevin Anderson | (Germany) Björn Phau | (Argentina) Juan Ignacio Chela |
| (Australia) Lleyton Hewitt | (Australia) Marinko Matosevic (WC) | (Australia) Matthew Ebden (WC) | (Finland) Jarkko Nieminen |
| (Italy) Potito Starace | (Germany) Simon Stadler (Q) | (Uzbekistan) Denis Istomin | (Brazil) Ricardo Mello |
| (Latvia) Ernests Gulbis [24] | (Kazakhstan) Mikhail Kukushkin | (France) Arnaud Clément | (Germany) Philipp Petzschner |
| (France) Vincent Millot (Q) | (Australia) Carsten Ball (WC) | (Israel) Dudi Sela | (Slovenia) Grega Žemlja (Q) |
| (Germany) Michael Berrer | (Argentina) Leonardo Mayer | (Spain) Rubén Ramírez Hidalgo | (Slovakia) Karol Beck |
| (Italy) Marco Crugnola (Q) | (Germany) Tobias Kamke | (United States) Ryan Harrison (WC) | (Canada) Frank Dancevic (Q) |
| (Russia) Nikolay Davydenko [23] | (Italy) Fabio Fognini | (Germany) Mischa Zverev | (Germany) Rainer Schüttler |
| (France) Stéphane Robert (Q) | (Italy) Filippo Volandri | (Italy) Flavio Cipolla (Q) | (Australia) Peter Luczak (WC) |
| (Russia) Dmitry Tursunov (PR) | (Australia) Brian Dabul | (Croatia) Ivo Karlović | (Spain) Marcel Granollers |
| (Czech Republic) Jan Hájek | (Poland) Michał Przysiężny | (Argentina) Carlos Berlocq | (Germany) Simon Greul (LL) |
| (Russia) Teymuraz Gabashvili | (Kazakhstan) Andrey Golubev | (Uruguay) Pablo Cuevas | (Netherlands) Thiemo de Bakker |
| (Romania) Victor Hănescu | (India) Somdev Devvarman (WC) | (Germany) Daniel Brands | (United States) Sam Querrey [18] |
| (Germany) Dustin Brown | (Spain) Pablo Andújar | (Chinese Taipei) Lu Yen-hsun | (Slovakia) Lukáš Lacko |

Women's singles

| Champion | | Runner-up | |
|---|---|---|---|
| (Belgium) Kim Clijsters [3] | | (China) Li Na [9] | |
Semifinals out
| (Denmark) Caroline Wozniacki [1] | | (Russia) Vera Zvonareva [2] | |
Quarterfinals out
| (Italy) Francesca Schiavone [6] | (Germany) Andrea Petkovic [30] | (Poland) Agnieszka Radwańska [12] | (Czech Republic) Petra Kvitová [25] |
4th round out
| (Latvia) Anastasija Sevastova | (Russia) Svetlana Kuznetsova [23] | (Russia) Maria Sharapova [14] | (Belarus) Victoria Azarenka [8] |
| (China) Peng Shuai | (Russia) Ekaterina Makarova | (Italy) Flavia Pennetta [22] | (Czech Republic) Iveta Benešová |
3rd round out
| (Slovakia) Dominika Cibulková [29] | (Russia) Vesna Manasieva (Q) | (Belgium) Justine Henin [11] | (Romania) Monica Niculescu |
| (United States) Venus Williams [4] | (Germany) Julia Görges | (Czech Republic) Barbora Záhlavová-Strýcová | (South Africa) Chanelle Scheepers |
| (Japan) Ayumi Morita | (Romania) Simona Halep | (Russia) Nadia Petrova [13] | (France) Alizé Cornet |
| (Australia) Samantha Stosur [5] | (Israel) Shahar Pe'er [10] | (Russia) Anastasia Pavlyuchenkova [16] | (Czech Republic) Lucie Šafářová [31] |
2nd round out
| (United States) Vania King | (Italy) Alberta Brianti | (Belgium) Yanina Wickmayer [21] | (France) Marion Bartoli [15] |
| (United Kingdom) Elena Baltacha | (Netherlands) Arantxa Rus (Q) | (Bulgaria) Tsvetana Pironkova [32] | (Canada) Rebecca Marino |
| (Czech Republic) Sandra Záhlavová | (United Kingdom) Anne Keothavong (Q) | (Estonia) Kaia Kanepi [20] | (France) Virginie Razzano |
| (Russia) Evgeniya Rodina | (Australia) Jelena Dokić (WC) | (Russia) Regina Kulikova | (Czech Republic) Andrea Hlaváčková |
| (Serbia) Jelena Janković [7] | (France) Caroline Garcia (WC) | (Russia) Alisa Kleybanova [24] | (Croatia) Petra Martić (Q) |
| (Australia) Alicia Molik (WC) | (Ukraine) Lesia Tsurenko (Q) | (Spain) María José Martínez Sánchez [26] | (Spain) Carla Suárez Navarro |
| (United States) Vera Dushevina | (Russia) Anna Chakvetadze | (Spain) Lourdes Domínguez Lino | (Romania) Sorana Cîrstea |
| (Germany) Kristina Barrois | (Russia) Maria Kirilenko [18] | (Czech Republic) Klára Zakopalová | (Serbia) Bojana Jovanovski |
1st round out
| (Argentina) Gisela Dulko | (Austria) Tamira Paszek | (Czech Republic) Lucie Hradecká | (Germany) Angelique Kerber |
| (Australia) Jarmila Groth | (Slovenia) Polona Hercog | (Spain) Laura Pous Tió | (Italy) Tathiana Garbin |
| (India) Sania Mirza (Q) | (United States) Jamie Hampton (Q) | (United States) Bethanie Mattek-Sands | (United States) Alison Riske |
| (France) Pauline Parmentier | (Switzerland) Timea Bacsinszky | (Japan) Junri Namigata | (Spain) Arantxa Parra Santonja |
| (Italy) Sara Errani | (Czech Republic) Renata Voráčová | (Russia) Arina Rodionova (Q) | (United States) Jill Craybas |
| (Slovakia) Magdaléna Rybáriková | (Romania) Edina Gallovits-Hall | (Russia) Elena Vesnina | (Thailand) Tamarine Tanasugarn |
| (Sweden) Sofia Arvidsson | (Australia) Olivia Rogowska (WC) | (Czech Republic) Zuzana Ondrášková | (France) Aravane Rezaï [17] |
| (Slovakia) Daniela Hantuchová [28] | (Croatia) Karolina Šprem | (Austria) Patricia Mayr-Achleitner | (Germany) Kathrin Wörle (Q) |
| (Russia) Alla Kudryavtseva | (Ukraine) Kateryna Bondarenko | (United States) Varvara Lepchenko | (Romania) Alexandra Dulgheru [27] |
| (United States) Irina Falconi (Q) | (Luxembourg) Anne Kremer (Q) | (Australia) Sophie Ferguson (WC) | (Japan) Kimiko Date-Krumm |
| (United States) Ksenia Pervak | (Italy) Roberta Vinci | (Switzerland) Patty Schnyder | (Serbia) Ana Ivanovic [19] |
| (Hungary) Gréta Arn | (United States) CoCo Vandeweghe (Q) | (United States) Christina McHale | (Russia) Dinara Safina |
| (United States) Lauren Davis (WC) | (Italy) Maria Elena Camerin | (Belarus) Olga Govortsova | (Australia) Sally Peers (WC) |
| (Australia) Anastasia Rodionova | (Sweden) Johanna Larsson | (Croatia) Mirjana Lučić | (France) Mathilde Johansson |
| (Belgium) Kirsten Flipkens | (Uzbekistan) Akgul Amanmuradova | (Spain) Anabel Medina Garrigues | (Italy) Romina Oprandi |
| (China) Zhang Shuai | (United States) Melanie Oudin | (Chinese Taipei) Chang Kai-chen | (Austria) Sybille Bammer |

== Events ==
=== Seniors ===
There were five competitions open to professional tennis players. The Association of Tennis Professionals and Women's Tennis Association awarded ranking points in all events apart from the mixed doubles. The singles draws were contested by one hundred and twenty-eight players, while sixty-four teams partook in the double's events, and thirty-two teams lined up in the mixed doubles competition.

==== Men's singles ====
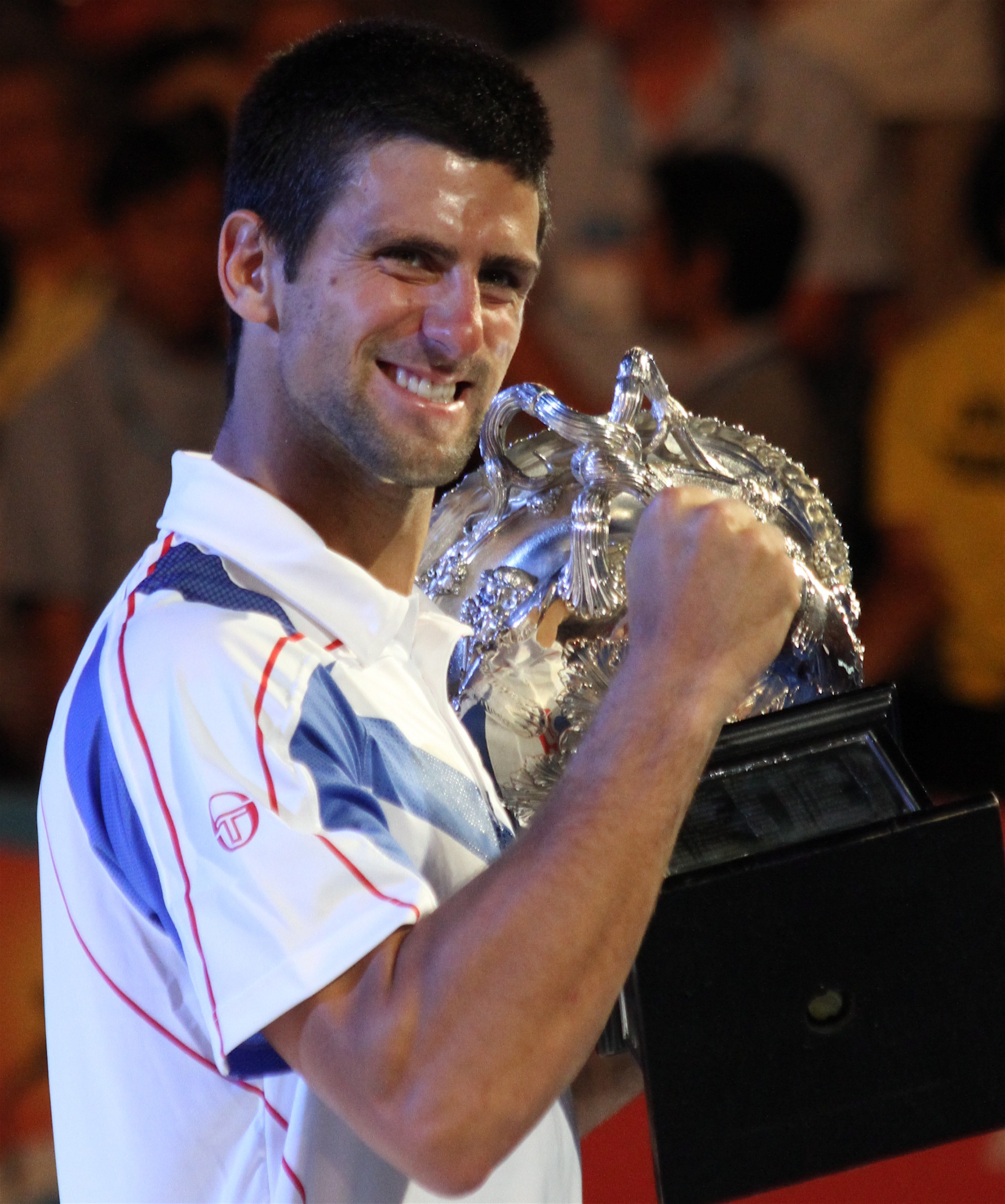
Novak Djokovic won the Australian Open for the second time.

At the start of the 2011 Australian Open, World Number one Rafael Nadal was on the edge of history, as he had an opportunity to become the first man since Rod Laver in 1969 to hold all four Grand Slams at the same time, after winning the previous three. This would not be the Grand Slam, but the media had dubbed the feat if Nadal was to achieve it the "Rafa Slam", which was taken from the "Serena Slam" which was coined when Serena Williams won all four Grand Slam titles in a row spanning two calendar years, which in turn was taken from the "Tiger Slam" in which golfer Tiger Woods accomplished a similar feat in golf.

Nadal was the number one seed and led the field. The other top ten seeds were; defending Australian Open champion and sixteen time Grand Slam champion Roger Federer, 2008 Australian Open winner Novak Djokovic, two time Grand Slam finalists Robin Söderling and Andy Murray, Wimbledon runner up Tomáš Berdych, David Ferrer, 2003 US Open champion Andy Roddick, Fernando Verdasco and Mikhail Youzhny.

The start of the 2011 Australian Open saw all the seeds apart from Gulbis, Querrey, who lost in the fifth set 8–6 and Davydenko make it to the second round. Montanes, Fish, Monfils, Baghdatis, Tsonga, Bellucci and Nalbandian all survived final set deciders. The second round witnessed all the seeds go through except Michaël Llodra who lost to qualifier Milos Raonic, Feliciano López who went out to Wildcard Bernard Tomic, Juan Mónaco lost to Robin Haase. Fish lost to Robredo and Albert Montañés lost to Malisse. While Nalbandian had to retire against Berenkis and Bellucci lost 8–6 in the final set to Hernych. Youzhny, Verdasco, Almagro and Federer all survived final set deciders to progress to the third round. Raonic continued his form from the previous round as he upset Youzhny this time in four sets, the biggest upset to date. While Alexandr Dolgopolov upset Tsonga coming back two sets to one down to win. The third round is also where the seeds meet for the first time, so Garcia–Lopez, Baghdatis, Gasquet, Ljubicic and Troicki all exited to higher seeds. While Stanislas Wawrinka who was the nineteenth seed managed to defeat Gaël Monfils the twelfth seed in straight sets. Marin Čilić, semifinalist from 2010 defeated John Isner 9–7 in the final set. The fourth round saw Ferrer end Raonic's run, and Dolgopolov edge out Soderling in the final set for the biggest upset in the tournament to date. There were also wins for Berdych, Djokovic, Federer, Murray and Nadal, all except Federer eliminated other seeds. There was one other upset as nineteenth seed Wawrinka beat Roddick in straight sets.

Djokovic, Federer and Murray successfully made their way into the semifinals, however the upset of the tournament happened as Nadal went out. The "Rafa Slam" attempt came to an end on Australia Day in straight sets against Ferrer, a year to the day since Nadal last lost a Grand Slam match. The semifinals witnessed Djokovic taking out Federer in straight sets while Murray overcame Ferrer the next night in four sets. In the final Djokovic defeated Murray for his second Australian Open crown in straight sets.

Championship match result

(Serbia) Novak Djokovic defeated (United Kingdom) Andy Murray, 6–4, 6–2, 6–3.

==== Women's singles ====
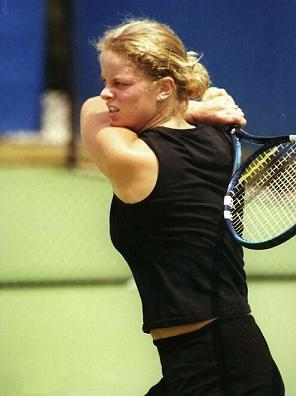
Kim Clijsters won her first Australian Open title.

The 2011 women's draw was missing its defending champion Serena Williams who pulled out in late 2010 due to ligament damage. World number one Caroline Wozniacki of Denmark was the number one seed. The Dane headed up the top ten seeds which included Vera Zvonareva, three-time US Open champion Kim Clijsters, seven-time Grand Slam champion Venus Williams, Samantha Stosur, reigning French Open Champion Francesca Schiavone, Jelena Janković, Victoria Azarenka, Li Na and Shahar Pe'er. Former Grand Slam champions, Justine Henin, Ana Ivanovic, Svetlana Kuznetsova and Maria Sharapova were also seeded.

The start of the 2011 Australian Open saw all the seeds apart from Rezaï, Hantuchová, Dulgheru. The biggest upset of the first round was Ivanovic losing 10–8 in the final set to Ekaterina Makarova while Schiavone survived after being a set down to win the final set. The biggest loser in the second round was Janković as she lost to Peng in straight sets. The Serb was not the only seed to exit though as Iveta Benešová defeated Maria Kirilenko, Martinez–Sanchez lost to Cornet. Kleybanova, Kanepi, Pironkova, Bartoli and Wickmayer all joined them on the plane home. Meanwhile, Schiavone had to survive another final set decider this time winning it 9–7. The third round saw Kutznetsova defeat Henin, in what turned out to be the Belgium's last ever match as she announced her retirement in the second week of the tournament. Andrea Petkovic had a virtual bye into round four as Williams retired after just seven points of their match. Makarova caused another upset as she knocked out Nadia Petrova, while Benešová defeated Anastasia Pavlyuchenkova in the final set. Other seeds who went out to other seeded players were Cibulková and Peer who lost in three sets. While Petra Kvitová ended home hopes as she disposed of Stosur, Sharapova had to come from a set down to progress to the next round.

The fourth round witnessed women's tennis history, as the match between Kuznetsova and Schiavone broke records. The match became the longest match, in terms of time for women in a Grand Slam as it lasted for 4 hours, and 44 minutes. At 8–7 in the final set Kutznetsova had three match points, but the Italian saved all three. In the next game Schiavone broke her opponents serve but touched the net after hitting the winner, meaning the point went to Kutznetsova, when holding three break points. Kutznetsova had another three match points in the next game before a run of four games in a row where the serve was broken. Finally, after breaking in the previous game and missing three match points Schiavone closed the match out to win 16–14 in the final set. Other fourth round matches saw Sevastova's run end against Wozniacki and Makarova's end against Clijsters, while Petkovic upset Sharapova in straight sets. Other upsets saw Na Li and Kvitová defeat higher seeded players.

"I finally feel like you guys can call me Aussie Kim, because I've won the title"

— Kim Clijsters, in her post final speech.

In the quarterfinals Wozniacki put an end to Schiavone's run by winning a final set decider. Also going into the semifinals were Li who defeated Petkovic, Clijsters who defeated Radwańska and Zvonareva who took care of Kvitová. In the first semifinal Li caused an upset, as she saved match point, to defeat the world number one Wozniacki in three sets. As a result, Li became the first Chinese citizen to reach a Grand Slam singles final. Her opponent in the final, Clijsters, won in straight sets against Zvonareva. In the final Clijsters came from a set down to claim her first Australian Open title. It was her fourth grand slam title in her career and second consecutive slam having won the US Open in 2010.

Championship match result

(Belgium) Kim Clijsters defeated (China) Li Na, 3–6, 6–3, 6–3.

==== Men's doubles ====
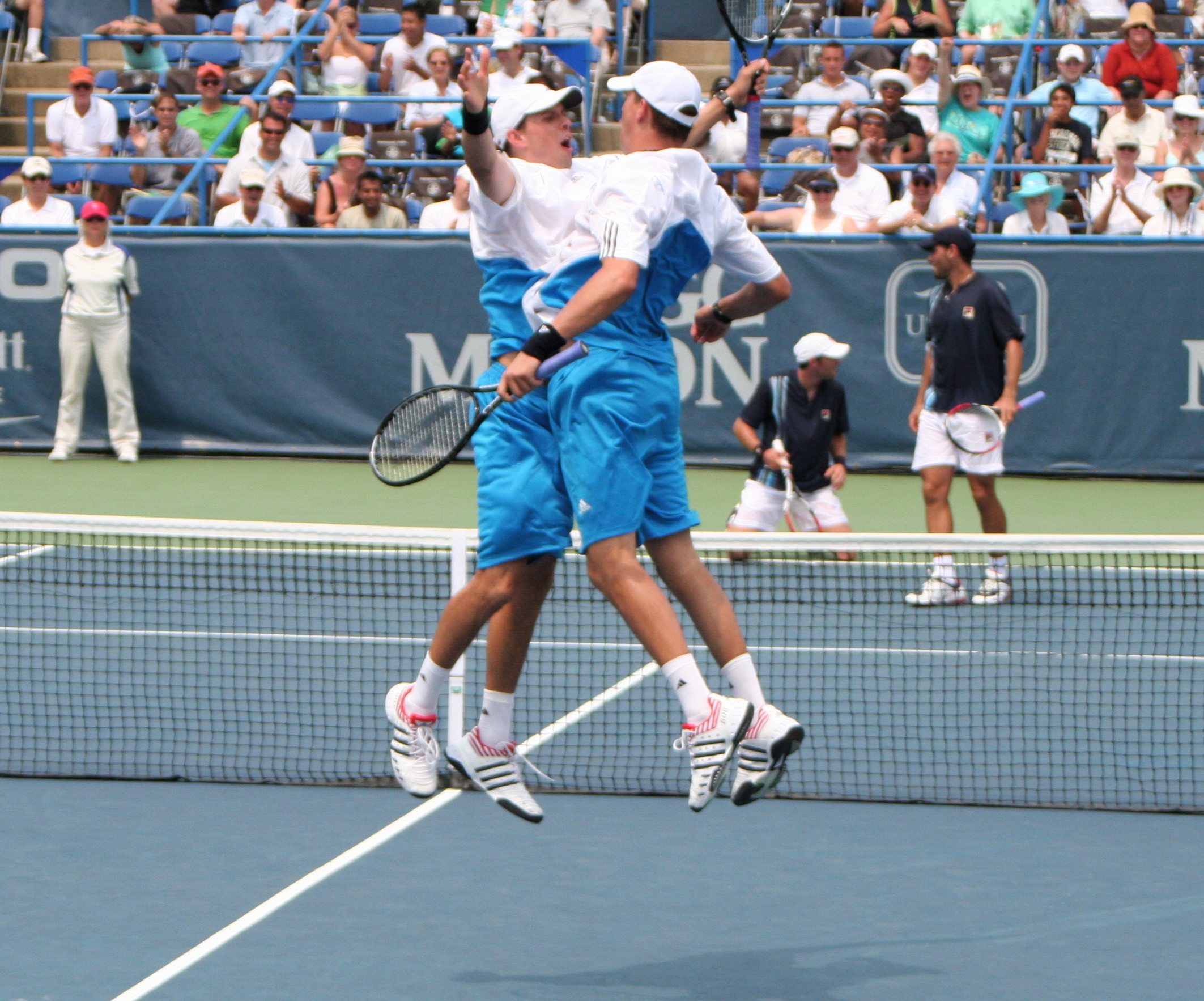
Bob and Mike Bryan won the men's doubles title for the fifth time and achieved a third consecutive title at the event.

The 2011 men's doubles competition saw the two-time defending champions and four-time champions overall come back to defend the two previous titles in the team of Bob and Mike Bryan, which they were the number one seeded team in the draw. All of the top eight seeds made the quarterfinals, with the exception being the seventh seeded team of Lukáš Dlouhý and Paul Hanley who exited in round one. Lastly, this event saw four teams exit in the quarterfinal round, which those was the 4th seeded team of Łukasz Kubot and Oliver Marach, Mariusz Fyrstenberg and Marcin Matkowski the 5 seeded team, the 6th seeded and 2010 Wimbledon Champions Jürgen Melzer and Philipp Petzschner, and the 8th seeded team of Michaël Llodra and Nenad Zimonjić.

In the semifinals Bhupathi and Peas beat Max Mirnyi and Daniel Nestor in the final set. This set up a final against the Bryan Brothers who won in straight sets over Butorac and Rojer. In the championship match the Bryan Brothers won in straight sets for their third title in a row. This was also the Bryan Brothers tenth Men's Doubles Grand Slam title leaving them one behind the Woodies (Todd Woodbridge and Mark Woodforde) all time grand slam record of 11 titles.

Championship match result

(United States) Bob Bryan / (United States) Mike Bryan defeated (India) Mahesh Bhupathi / (India) Leander Paes, 6–3, 6–4.

==== Women's doubles ====
The 2011 women's doubles competition was wide open with no team in the field having previously won a grand slam. Argentina's Gisela Dulko and Flavia Pennetta of Italy led the field as the number one seeds, who had won seven titles in 2010 including the WTA championships, but they had never been past a Grand Slam semifinal. Second seeds were the French Open finalists Květa Peschke and Katarina Srebotnik, who had already won a tournament in 2011, the ASB Classic. Number three seeds are the US Open finalists Liezel Huber and Nadia Petrova; the number four seeds are the 2009 WTA Champions Nuria Llagostera Vives and María José Martínez Sánchez with Cara Black and Anastasia Rodionova seeded fifth heading the field.

All the seeds made it through the opening round with the exception of Francesca Schiavone and Rennae Stubbs, who lost, winning just five games in what was Stubbs' final Australian Open. In round two the biggest casualties were the departure of the number four seeds; Llagostera Vives and Martínez Sánchez in straight sets. In the third round the number six, seven and eighth seeds all crashed out. In the quarterfinals Huber won the battle of the ex-partners as she downed Black's team to set up a semifinal with Dulko and Penetta. The other semi was filled by Azarenka and Kirilenko and the number two seeds. In the semis the Number one seeds advanced to the final where after a shock they faced Azerenka and Kilrenko. In the final Dulko and Pennetta came from a set down to win.

Championship match result

(Argentina) Gisela Dulko / (Italy) Flavia Pennetta defeated (Belarus) Victoria Azarenka / (Russia) Maria Kirilenko, 2–6, 7–5, 6–1.

==== Mixed doubles ====
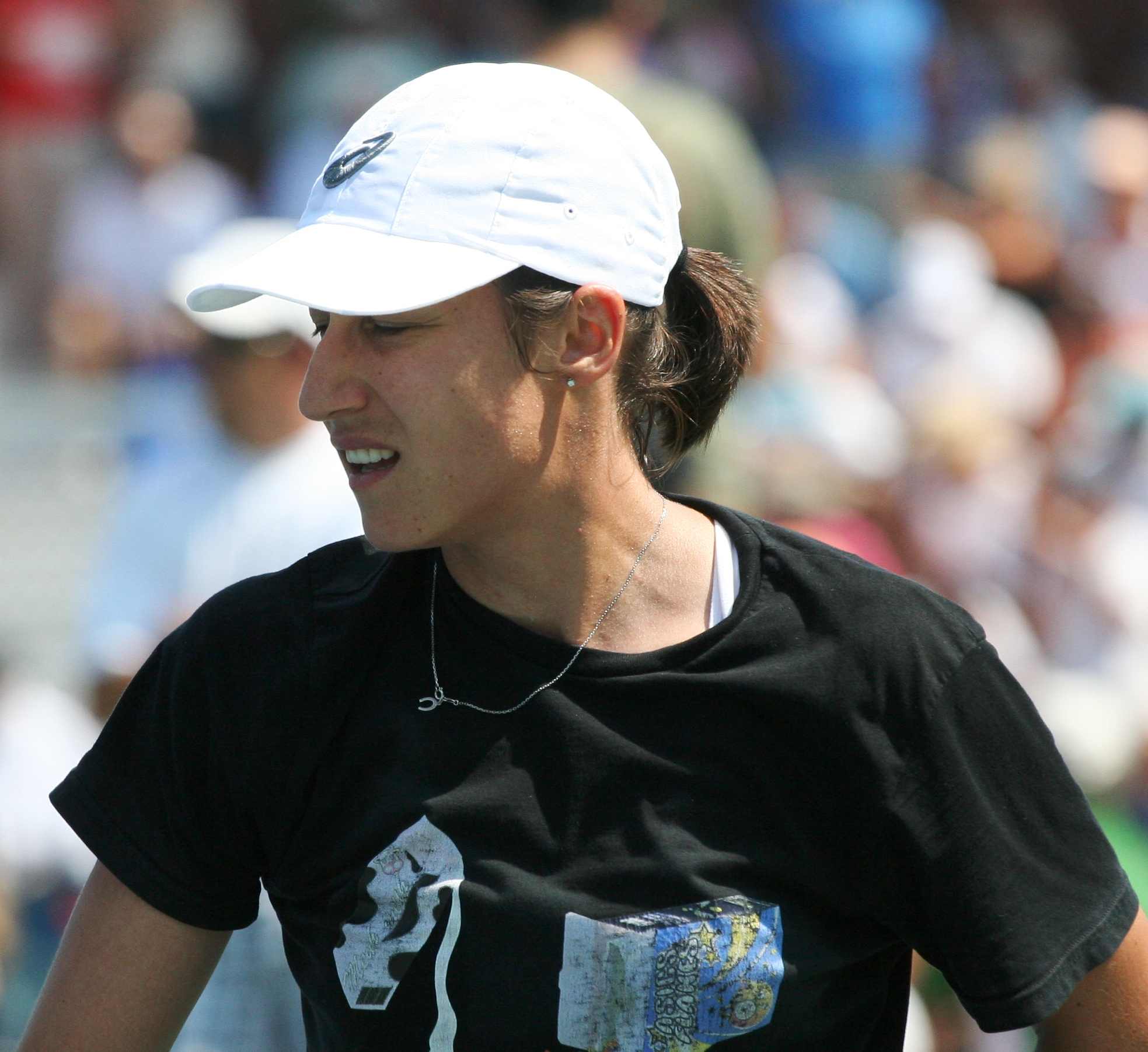
Katarina Srebotnik won her first Australian Open Mixed Doubles crown. She was partnered by Daniel Nestor.

The mixed doubles field was led by top seeds and US Open champions Bob Bryan and Liezel Huber. Other significant seeds were number two seeds Daniel Nestor and Katarina Srebotnik, Nestor's ex-doubles partner Nenad Zimonjić and Maria Kirilenko are the third seeds. Fourth seeds were defending champions Leander Paes and Cara Black, while the fifth and sixth seeds were Aisam-ul-Haq Qureshi and Květa Peschke and Wesley Moodie and Lisa Raymond.

All the seeded teams made it through the first round apart from the teams of Aisam-ul-Haq Qureshi and Květa Peschke who lost to Rennae Stubbs and Chris Guccione and Moody and Reymond who lost to Horia Tecău and Bethanie Mattek-Sands. The second round witnessed the number one seeds Bryan and Huber withdraw and the defending champions, Paes and Black go out to Paul Hanley and Chan Yung-jan after two tiebreak sets. The quarterfinals saw no upsets as Nestor and Srebotnik, Zimonjic and Kirlienko, Hanley and Chan and Tecau and Mettek–Sands made the semifinals. In the semifinals Nestor and Srebotnik won in straight sets against Zimonjic and Kirilenko. Their opponents in the final were Hanley and Chan after they won a match tiebreak 11–9 against Tecau and Mettek–Sands. The final came down to a match tiebreak which the number two seeds, Nestor and Srebotnik won. It was Nestor's second Australian Open mixed title while for Srebotnik it was her first.

Championship match result

(Slovenia) Katarina Srebotnik / (Canada) Daniel Nestor defeated (Chinese Taipei) Chan Yung-jan / (Australia) Paul Hanley, 6–3, 3–6, [10–7].

=== Juniors ===
Sixty-four players competed in the boys and girls' singles events, with thirty-two teams competing in the boys and girls doubles events. The event is one of nine ITF Grade A junior competitions. Qualifying for the main draw took place between 20 and 21 January 2011. Sixty-four players attempted to qualify for the main draw of the boys and girls' singles. There were eight qualifying spots available to join the forty-six direct acceptance, two special exemptions and eight wildcards in the main draw. The qualifying event was held at the Pakenham Regional Tennis Centre. The main draws took place between 23 and 29 January 2011.

==== Boys' singles ====
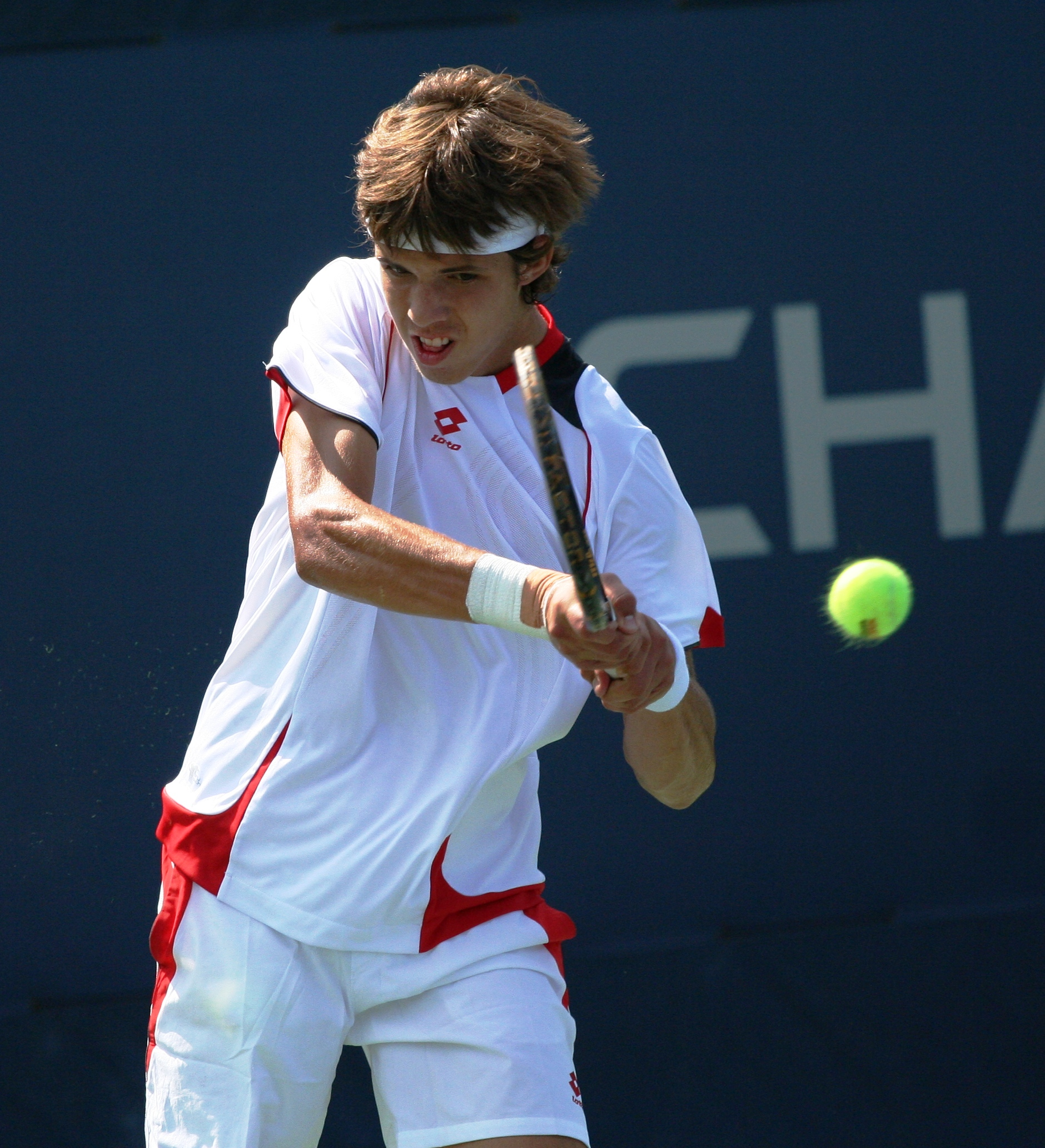
Jiri Veselý won both the singles and the doubles titles

World number one Jiří Veselý led the field. Other top seeds included World number two Dominic Thiem, Orange Bowl Champion George Morgan and World number five Mate Pavić. In the first round of the tournament Pavić exited in straight sets to Karim Hossam. While fellow seeds Dimitri Bretting, Joris De Loore and Ben Wagland also went out of the tournament. Also in action was Vesley and the 2010 finalist Sean Berman who both won their opening matches. Luke Saville caused the biggest upset in the second round as he ousted World number two Thiem in straight sets while Veselý and Morgan progressed with straight sets wins. The third round saw Morgan and Saville win epics in the final set. The quarterfinals saw Veselý, Morgan, Carballés and Saville reach the semifinals, where Veselý and Saville reached the final. In the final Veselý claimed his first junior Grand Slam title as he lost just three games against home hope Saville.

Championship match result

(Czech Republic) Jiří Veselý defeated (Australia) Luke Saville, 6–0, 6–3.

==== Girls' singles ====
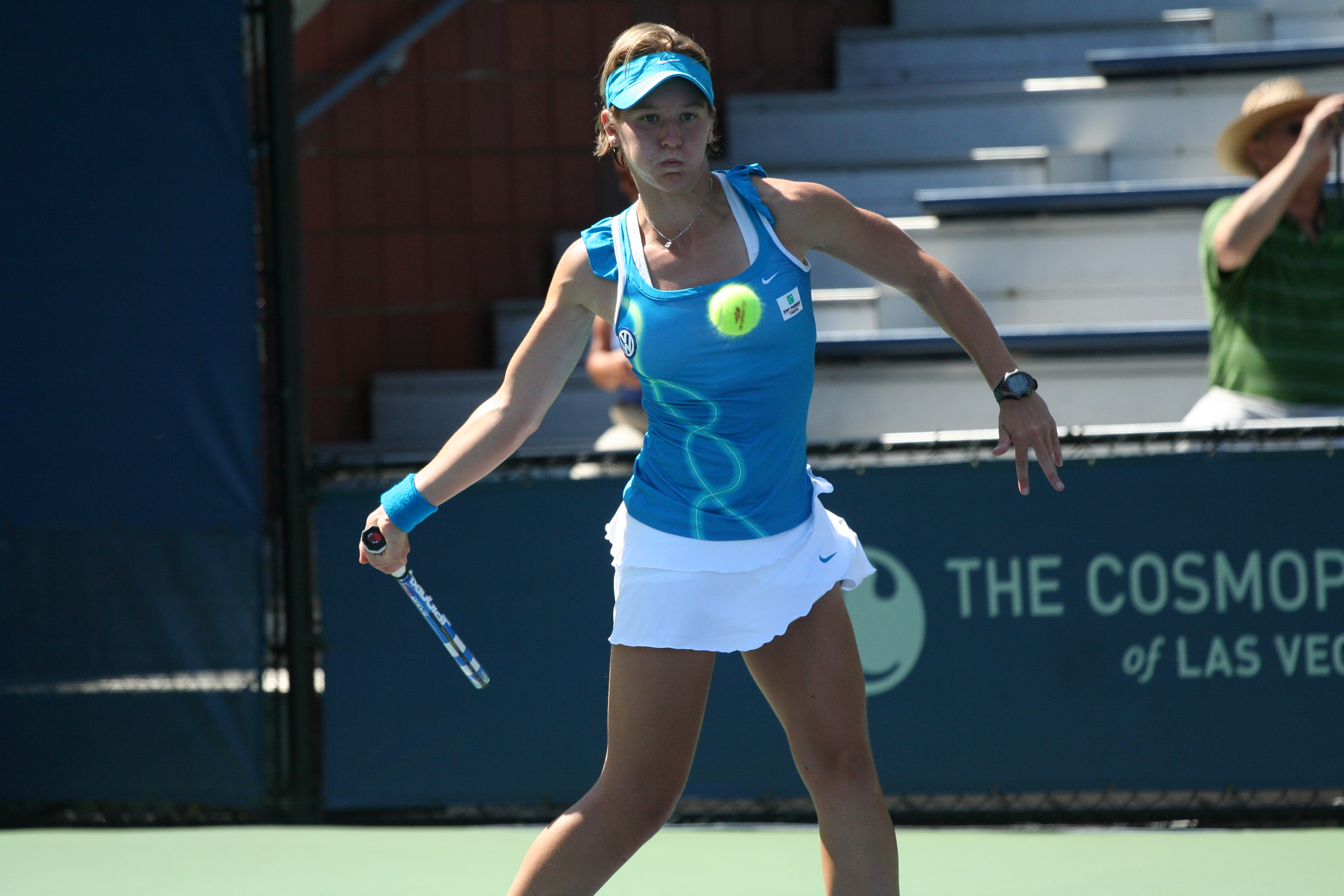
Mestach became the first girl to win both the singles and doubles titles at an Australian Open since Anastasia Pavlyuchenkova.

The 2011 Australian Open girls' field was led by the World number one, US Open and youth Olympic champion, Daria Gavrilova. Joining the Russian leading the field was An-Sophie Mestach, Irina Khromacheva and Monica Puig. While Orange Bowl champion Lauren Davis who competed in the main draw of the women's singles was the third seed and she was also joined by Caroline Garcia who also appeared in the women's draw. The first round saw all of the seeds bar Natalija Kostic move into the second round. Gavrilova, however, was not in the second round as she was dumped out in straight sets by fifteen-year-old Kanami Tsuji Puig, in the second round got rid of the last of the home contingent losing just two games in the process. Eugenie Bouchard caused the biggest upset of round three when she lost just three games against Davis. Garcia caused an upset in the quarterfinals as she upset the number four seed Khromacheva in straight sets. The semifinals witnessed Mestach drop her first and only set of the tournament when she defeated Garcia whilst Puig saw off Bouchard in straight sets. In the final Mestach defeated Puig in straight sets to win her first junior Grand Slam title.

Championship match result

(Belgium) An-Sophie Mestach defeated (Puerto Rico) Monica Puig, 6–4, 6–2.

==== Boys' doubles ====
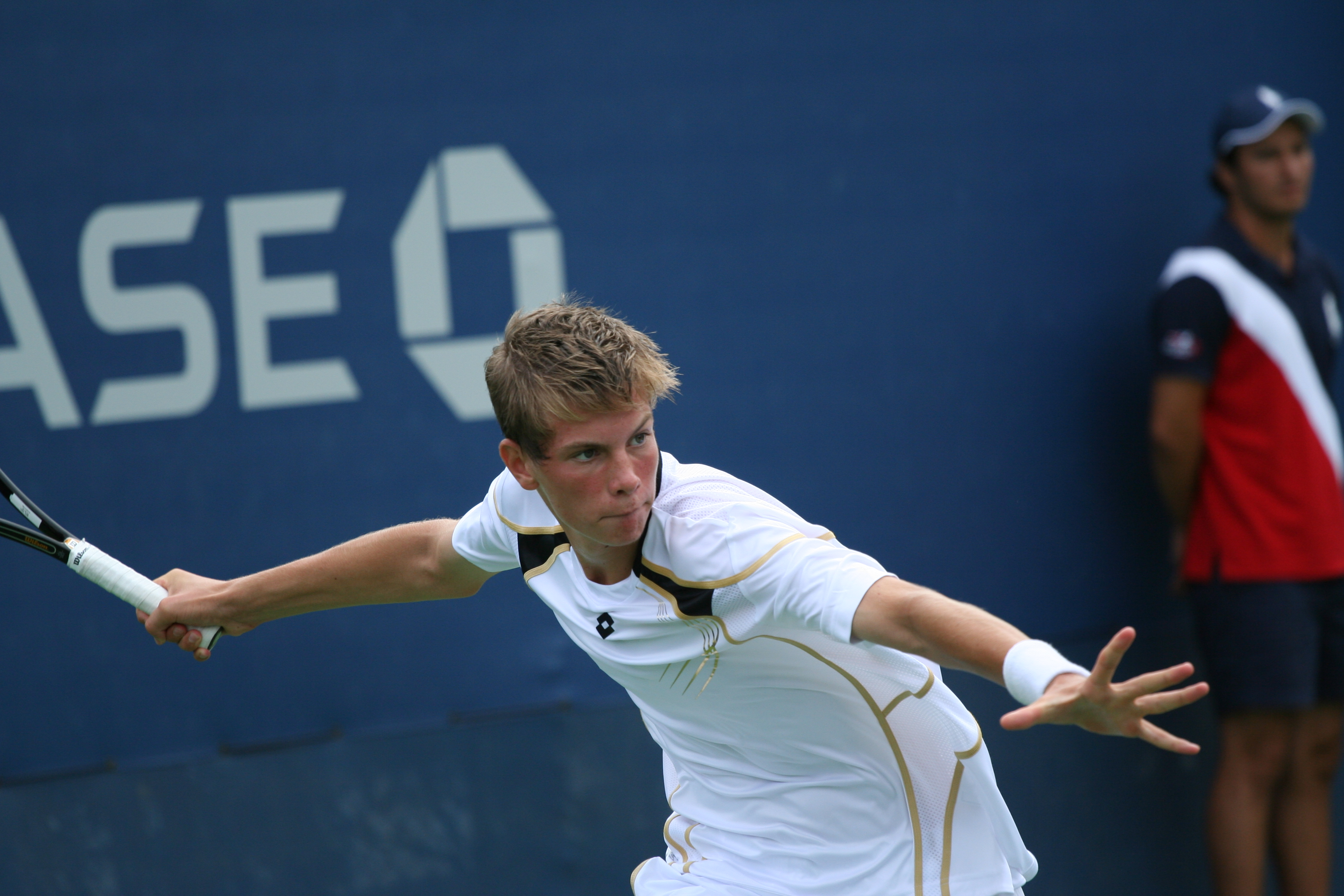
Filip Horansky won his first Junior Grand Slam title.

The first round witnessed Dimitri Bretting and Dennis Novak the fifth seeds and seventh seeds Luis Patiño and Filip Peliwo exit at the first hurdle. All the remaining seeds made it to the quarterfinals, where the number one seeds George Morgan and Mate Pavić who exited to the eighth seeds Mitchell Krueger and Karue Sell in a match tiebreak while second seeds Filip Horanský and Jiří Veselý knocked out sixth seeds Dominic Thiem and Matthias Wunner. Horansky and Vesely reached the final after defeating the fourth seeds Joris de Loore and Mate Delić who received a bye in the previous round in straight sets. While third seeds Ben Wagland and Andrew Whittington took care of Krueger and Sell in a match tiebreak. Horansky and Vesely triumphed in straight sets in the final over Wagland and Whttington.

Championship match result

(Slovakia) Filip Horanský / (Czech Republic) Jiří Veselý defeated (Australia) Ben Wagland / (Australia) Andrew Whittington, 6–4, 6–4.

==== Girls' doubles ====
All the seeds made it through the first round without incident. Nastja Kolar and Danka Kovinić the fifth seeds, Tang Haochen and Tian Ran the seventh seeds and the biggest upset with the second seeds Eugenie Bouchard and Monica Puig all went out in the second round. In the quarterfinals An-Sophie Mestach and Demi Schuurs sent the number one seeds Irina Khromacheva and Yulia Putintseva home for the loss of just three games. While Margarita Gasparyan and Daria Gavrilova the fourth seeds lost a match tiebreaker to Eri Hozumi and Miyu Kato whilst Lucia Butkovská and Anna Schmiedlová the eighth seeds won only one game. Kato and Hozumi progressed to the final, where they faced Mestach and Schuurs who knocked out the third seeds Natalija Kostić and Ilona Kremen in a match tiebreaker. In the final Mestach and Schuurs defeated Hozumi and Kato in straight sets for their first Grand Slam doubles title.

Championship match result

(Belgium) An-Sophie Mestach / (Netherlands) Demi Schuurs defeated (Japan) Eri Hozumi / (Japan) Miyu Kato, 6–2, 6–3.

=== Wheelchair tennis ===
There are six events in the wheelchair tennis discipline; a singles and doubles draw for each of the three categories. The tournament was played between 26 and 29 January 2011. All events were part of the NEC tour under the Grand Slam category. A total of $63,000 was awarded in prize money across all the events.

==== Wheelchair men's singles ====
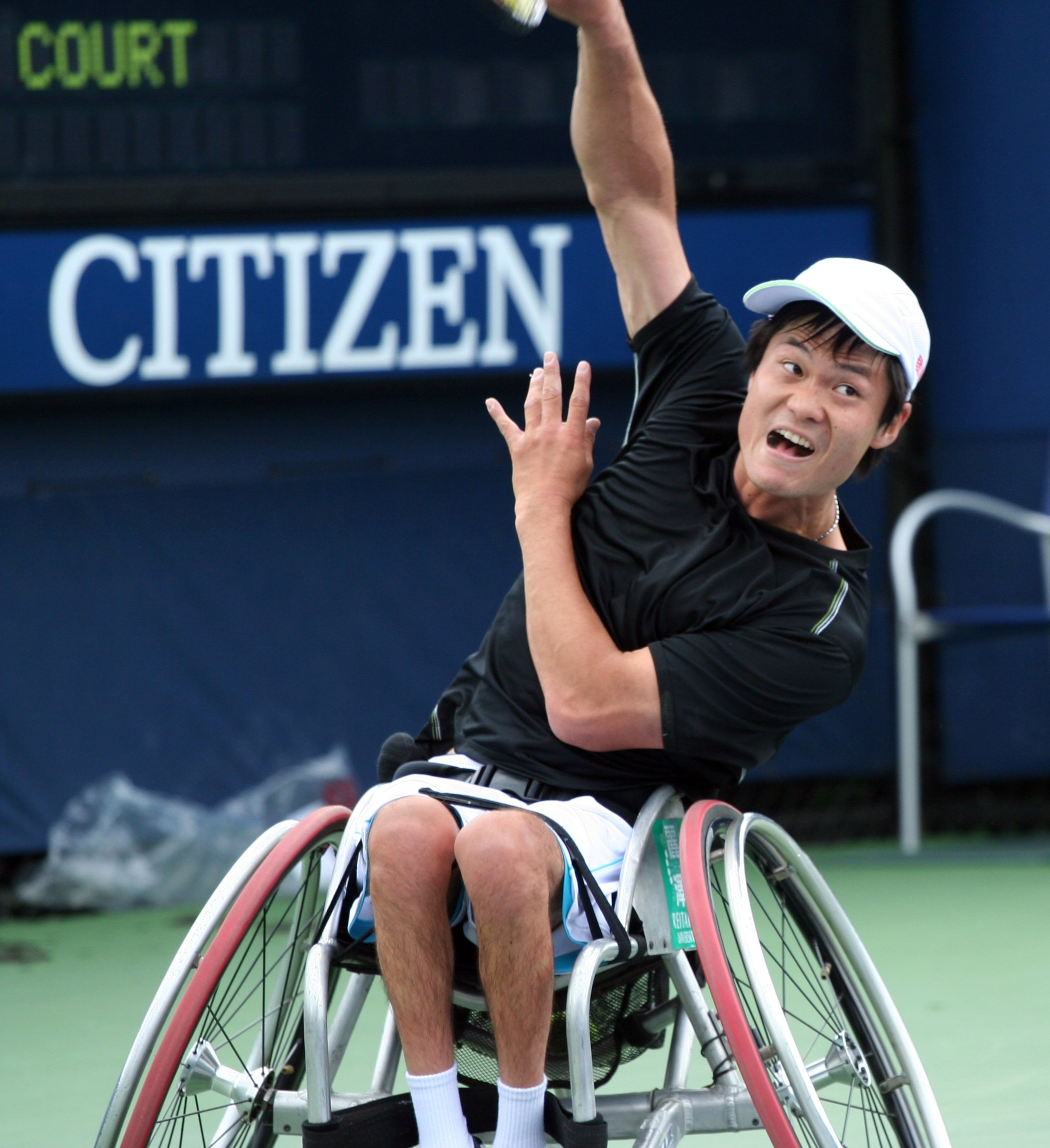
Kunieda won his fourth consecutive Australian Open

In the opening round World number one Shingo Kunieda defeated Ronald Vink for the loss of just one game. Kunieda would play Robin Ammerlaan in the semifinals after the Dutchman defeated home hope Ben Weekes. In the other half of the draw Stéphane Houdet saw off Maikel Scheffers while Stefan Olsson saw off Houdet's doubles partner Nicolas Peifer. In the semifinals Kunieda and Houdet emerged victorious in the battle for the final. Kunieda defeated Houdet for his twelfth Grand Slam title losing just three games.

Championship match result

(Japan) Shingo Kunieda defeated (France) Stéphane Houdet, 6–0, 6–3.

==== Wheelchair women's singles ====
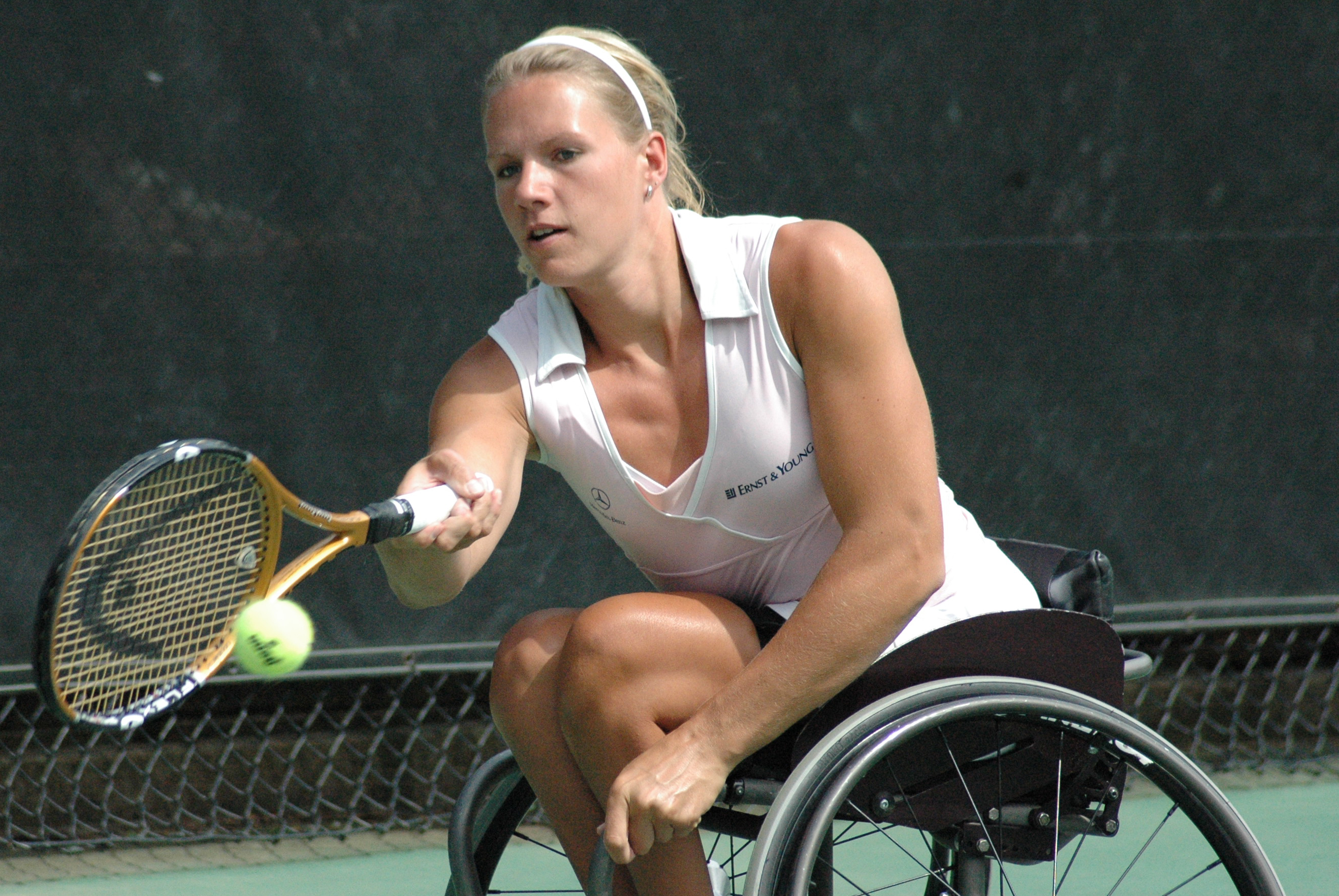
Esther Vergeer won her eighth Australian Open and recorded her 404th consecutive match win.

There were eight entries into the singles competition. On her Grand Slam debut Marjolein Buis won in three sets against Annick Sevenans to reach the semifinals. Also into the semifinals were World number one Esther Vergeer who recorded her four hundred and second consecutive match win with a 6–0, 6–0 win over her doubles partner, Sharon Walraven. Buis then took on World number two and home favourite Daniela Di Toro who lost just three games on Australia Day against Aniek van Koot. While Jiske Griffioen would play Vergeer in the semifinals after defeating Grand Slam debutant Jordanne Whiley in straight sets. The semifinals witnessed di Toro and Vergeer make the final with straight sets wins. In the final Vergeer claimed her eighth Australian Open title as she defeated di Toro without losing a game to chalk up her four hundredth and fourth consecutive win.

Championship match result

(Netherlands) Esther Vergeer defeated (Australia) Daniela Di Toro, 6–0, 6–0.

==== Wheelchair quad singles ====
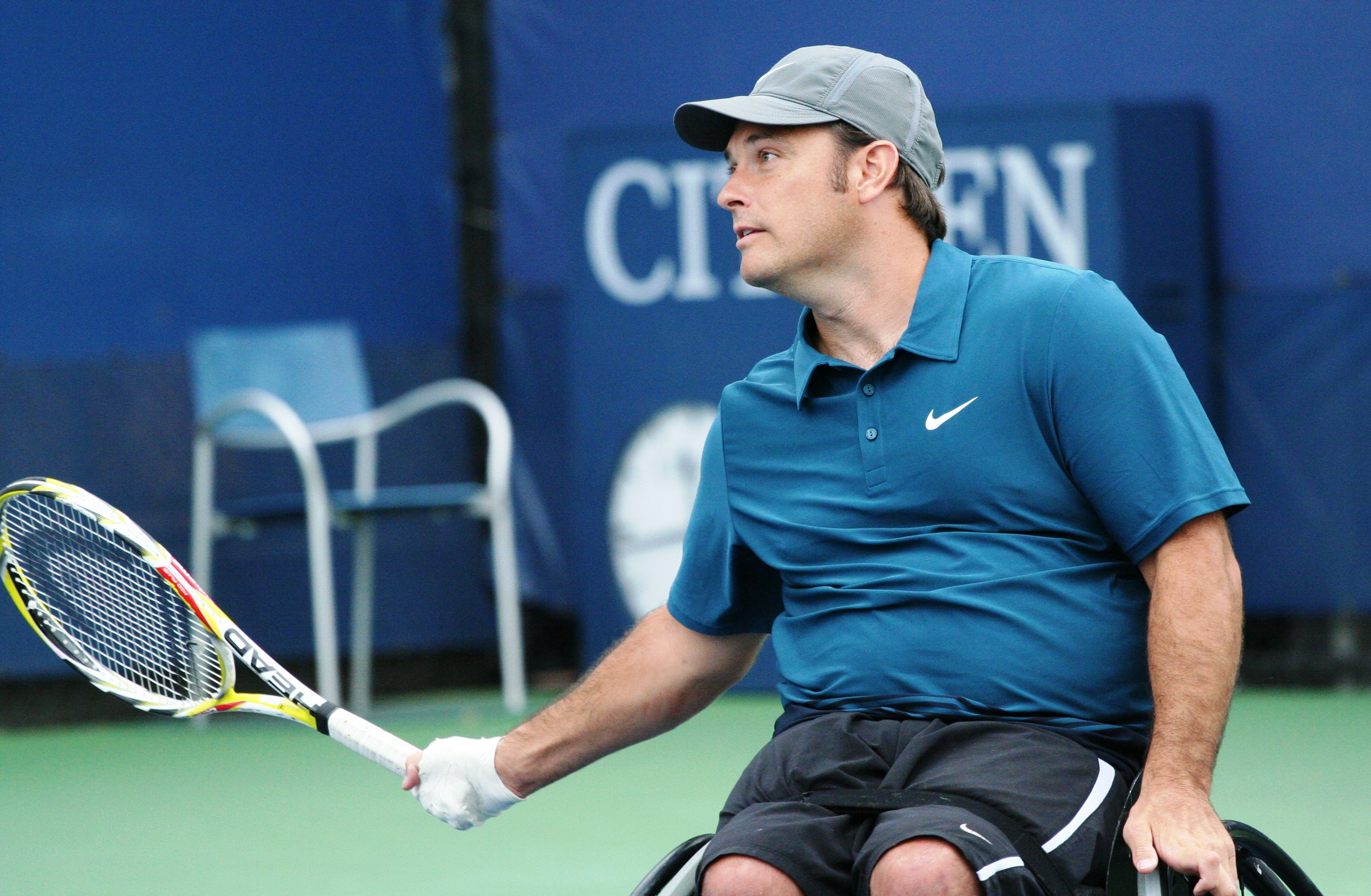
David Wagner defeated Peter Norfolk for the first time in five finals to win the Australian Open for the first time.

The tournament was played in a round robin format. Peter Norfolk, the defending champion, opened with a straight sets win over doubles partner Andrew Lapthorne. Whilst World number one David Wagner defeated his doubles partner Nick Taylor for the loss of two games. In the second round of matches Wagner edged Norfolk in a final set decider, whilst Grand Slam debutant Lapthorne recorded his first victory as he won in straight sets against Taylor. The loss for Taylor meant that he was eliminated from the event. In the final round robin matches, Norfolk defeated Taylor for the loss of just three games, while Wagner defeated Lapthorne in straight sets. The win for Norfolk and the loss for Lapthorne meant that Norfolk would play Wagner in the final. In the final Wagner defeated Norfolk for the loss of just five games. It was Wagner's first Australian Open singles title.

Championship match result

(United States) David Wagner defeated (United Kingdom) Peter Norfolk, 6–2, 6–3.

==== Wheelchair men's doubles ====
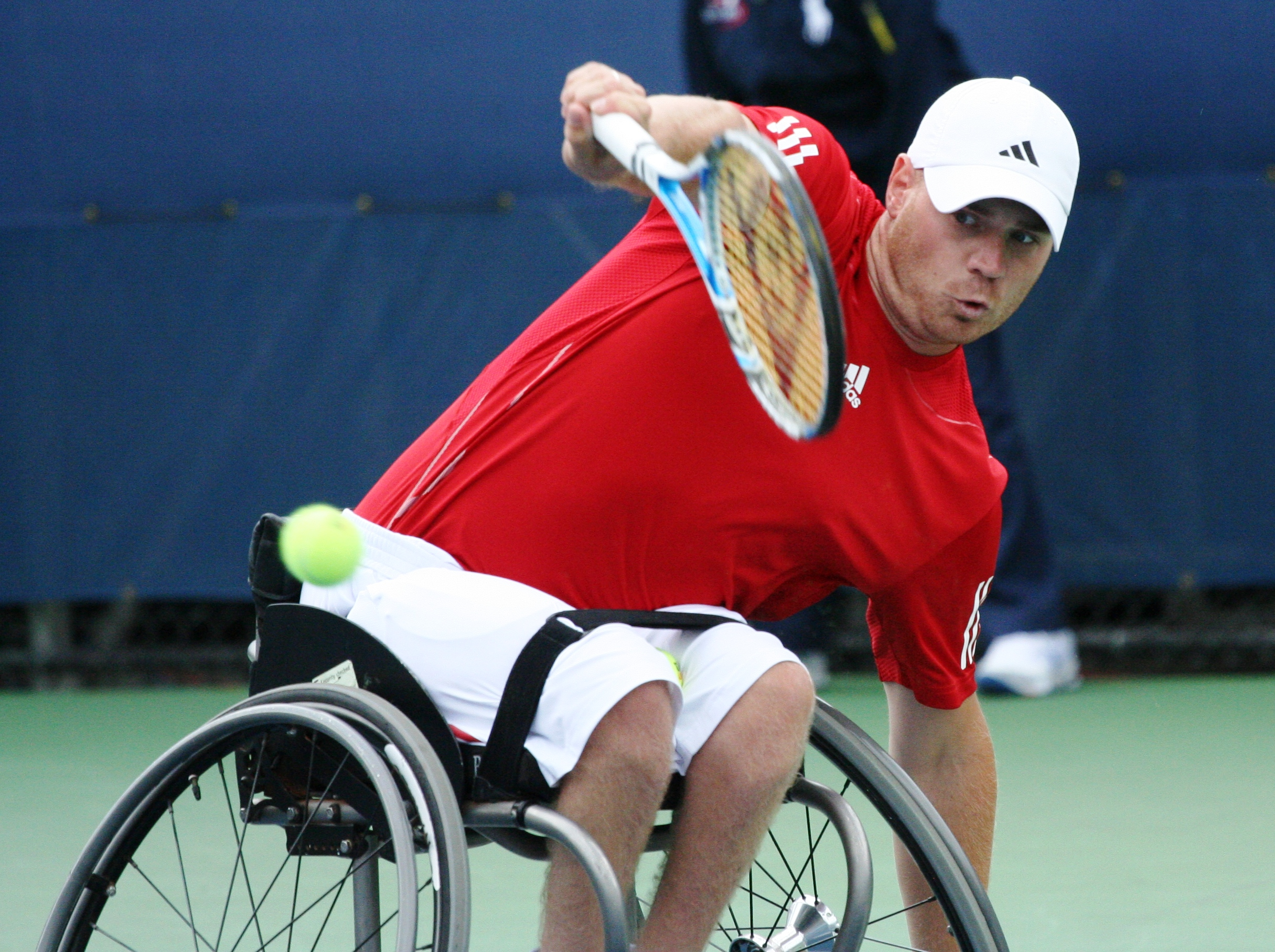
Scheffers won the doubles with Kunieda

There was four teams competing in this event. Shingo Kunieda and Maikel Scheffers beat Wimbledon champions, Robin Ammerlaan and Stefan Olsson in straight sets. They were joined in the final by the all French pairing of Stéphane Houdet and Nicolas Peifer who defeated Ronald Vink and Ben Weekes. In the final Kunieda and Scheffers came from a break down in the first set to defeat the French pair in straight sets.

Championship match result

(Japan) Shingo Kunieda / (Netherlands) Maikel Scheffers defeated (France) Stéphane Houdet / (France) Nicolas Peifer, 6–3, 6–3.

==== Wheelchair women's doubles ====
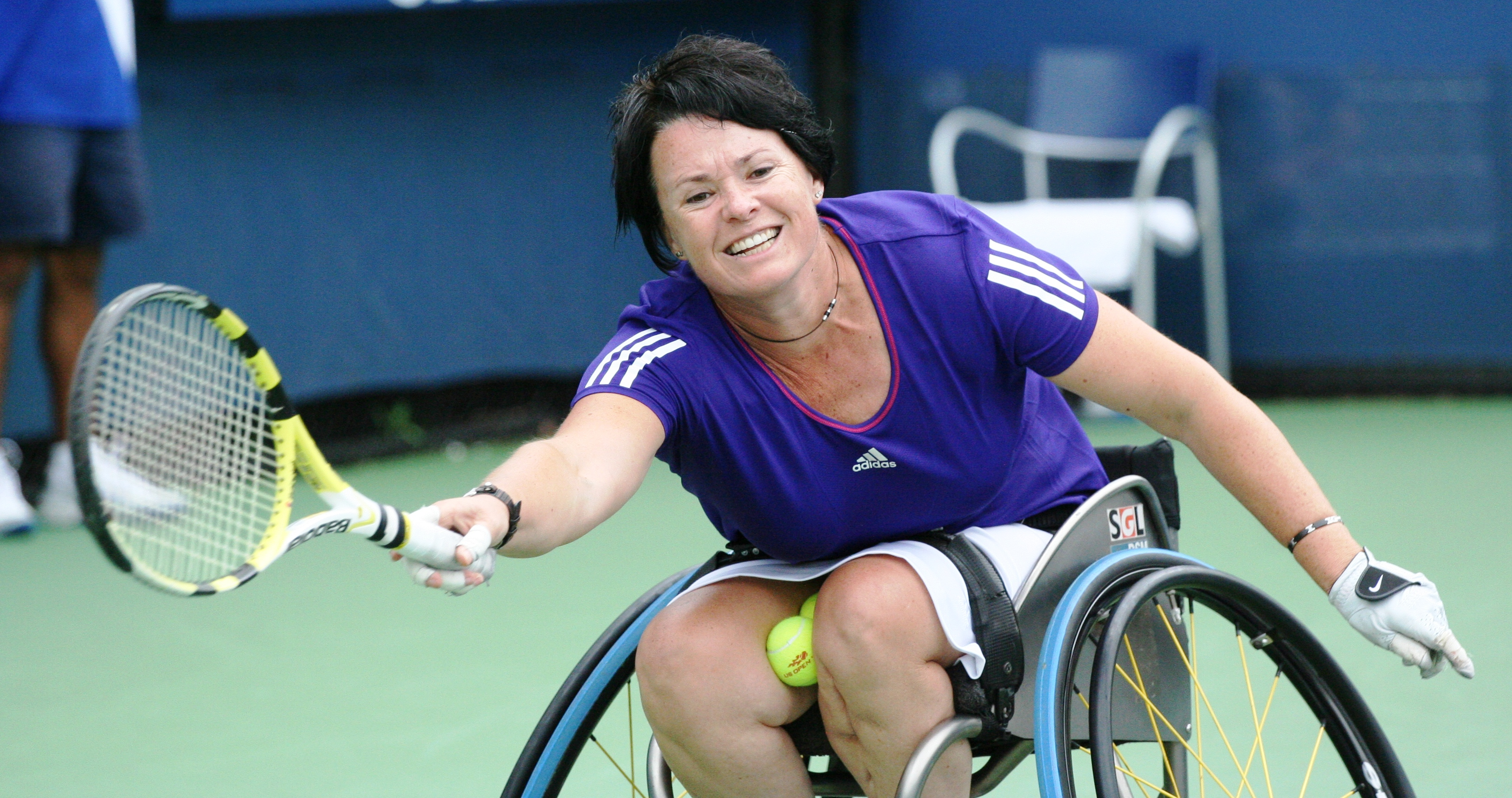
Sharon Walraven won the doubles with Vergeer

There were four entries to this competition. Esther Vergeer and Sharon Walraven defeated Daniela Di Toro and Jordanne Whiley in straight sets to make the final. The final was turned into an all-Dutch affair as Aniek van Koot and Jiske Griffioen joined them after defeating Marjolein Buis and Annick Sevenans in two tiebreaks. In the final Vergeer and Walraven lost just two games as they defeated van Koot and Griffioen to claim their third consecutive Grand Slam title.

Championship match result

(Netherlands) Esther Vergeer / (Netherlands) Sharon Walraven defeated (Netherlands) Jiske Griffioen / (Netherlands) Aniek van Koot, 6–0, 6–2.

==== Wheelchair quad doubles ====
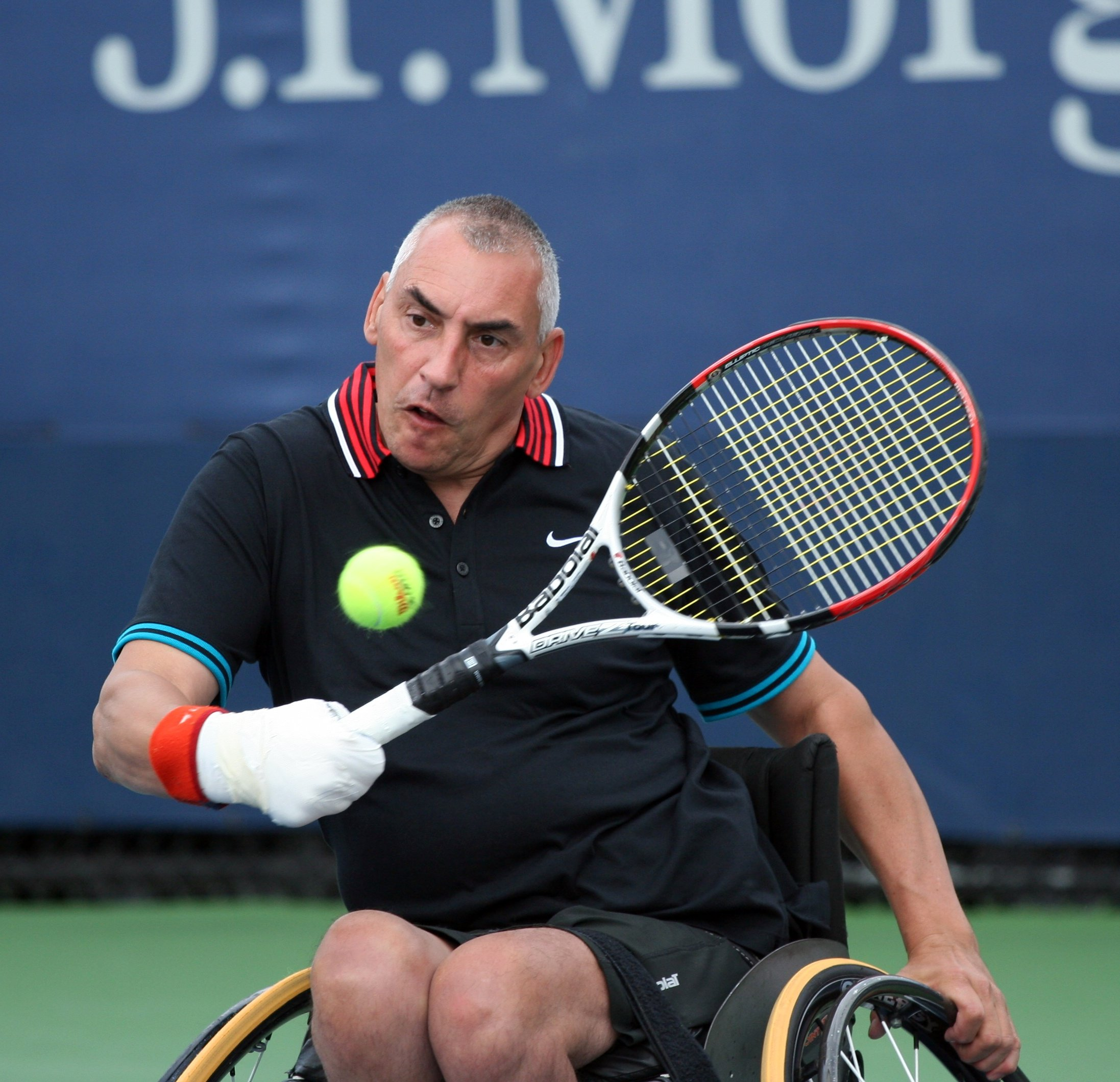
Norfolk won the Quad doubles with Andrew Lapthorne. It was Norfolk's first Australian Open doubles title.

There were just two entries in the quad doubles, and they played a straight final to decide the championship. In the one-off match history was made as Lapthorne and Norfolk became the first all-British pair to win a wheelchair Grand Slam doubles title. It was Lapthorne's first Grand Slam title and Norfolk's first Grand Slam doubles title as the pair defeated the all-American pair of Taylor and Wagner in straight sets for their fourth win over them.

Championship match result

(United Kingdom) Andrew Lapthorne / (United Kingdom) Peter Norfolk defeated (United States) Nicholas Taylor / (United States) David Wagner, 6–3, 6–3.

== Spectatorship ==
=== Broadcast ===
The 2011 Australian Open was broadcast around the world with eleven different broadcasters officially screening the event. Channel 7 was the host broadcaster, with ESPN covering North America with its International franchise covering South and Latin America. Eurosport holds the rights to broadcast the tournament in Europe. In Asia broadcasts were covered by ESPN Star Sports and in Japan by Wowow and by CN Sports Interactive Media Group in China. In Africa coverage is by SuperSport, and in the middle east by Abu Dhabi TV. Pacific coverage was broadcast by Sky New Zealand in New Zealand and by FIJI TV in Fiji. During the course of the tournament, Tennis Australia and Eurosport, announced that they had extended their partnership for another five years, which extends Eurosports unbroken coverage of the Australian Open to over twenty years.

For the first time in the history of the Australian Open, the qualifying competition for the main draw was streamed live on the internet. Camera's covered courts number three, five, six and seven, as the competition was streamed live on australianopen.com, foxsports.com.au, yahoo7.com, livestream.com and on the Australian Open's Facebook page. The qualifying competition was broadcast between 12 and 15 January. The charity event Rally for Relief was also broadcast live on australianopen.com and Australian network channel seven.

During the first week of the tournament, viewing figures in Australia were down for the second year running. 1.36 million people tuned in for the Men's singles final which was lower than the rating which the women's final received according to figures released by OzTAM.

=== Attendance ===
2011 introduced a kids tennis day event, which took place on the Saturday before the tournament took place, the final day of qualifying (But due to play being washed out Sunday was the final day of qualifying). Around eight thousand fans attended the day, as fans entertained themselves in a variety of activities, including watching stringers string racquets and arts and crafts. But the highlight of the day for many fans was a chance to watch past and present players on show court three. These players included, Pat Cash, Henri Leconte, Peter Luczak, Alicia Molik and Anastasia Rodionova.

A full house of 15,000 people watched the charity fund-raiser Rally for Relief on the Rod Laver Arena, while another twelve hundred watched in the grounds bringing the attendance for the day to 16,220.

A total of 651,127 patrons attended the tournament throughout the two weeks, which was lower than the attendance in 2010, although daily records were set on several days. The middle Saturday witnessed a record-breaking crowd. As 51,276 filled Melbourne Park, which was a record for the middle Saturday and the biggest crowd ever at the Australian Open for a day session. A further 25,845 attended the evening session which brought the total number of patrons for the day to 77,121 which was again record breaking as it was the largest number of spectators to have attended on one day.

== Players ==
=== Professional players ===
==== Singles seeds ====
The men's and women's singles draw of the 2011 Australian Open seeded the top thirty-two players who were not injured. The seeds were set on the ranking system's that the Association of Tennis Professionals and the Women's Tennis Association use; so the top thirty-two players seeded were the top thirty-two players according to their rankings.

===== Men's singles =====
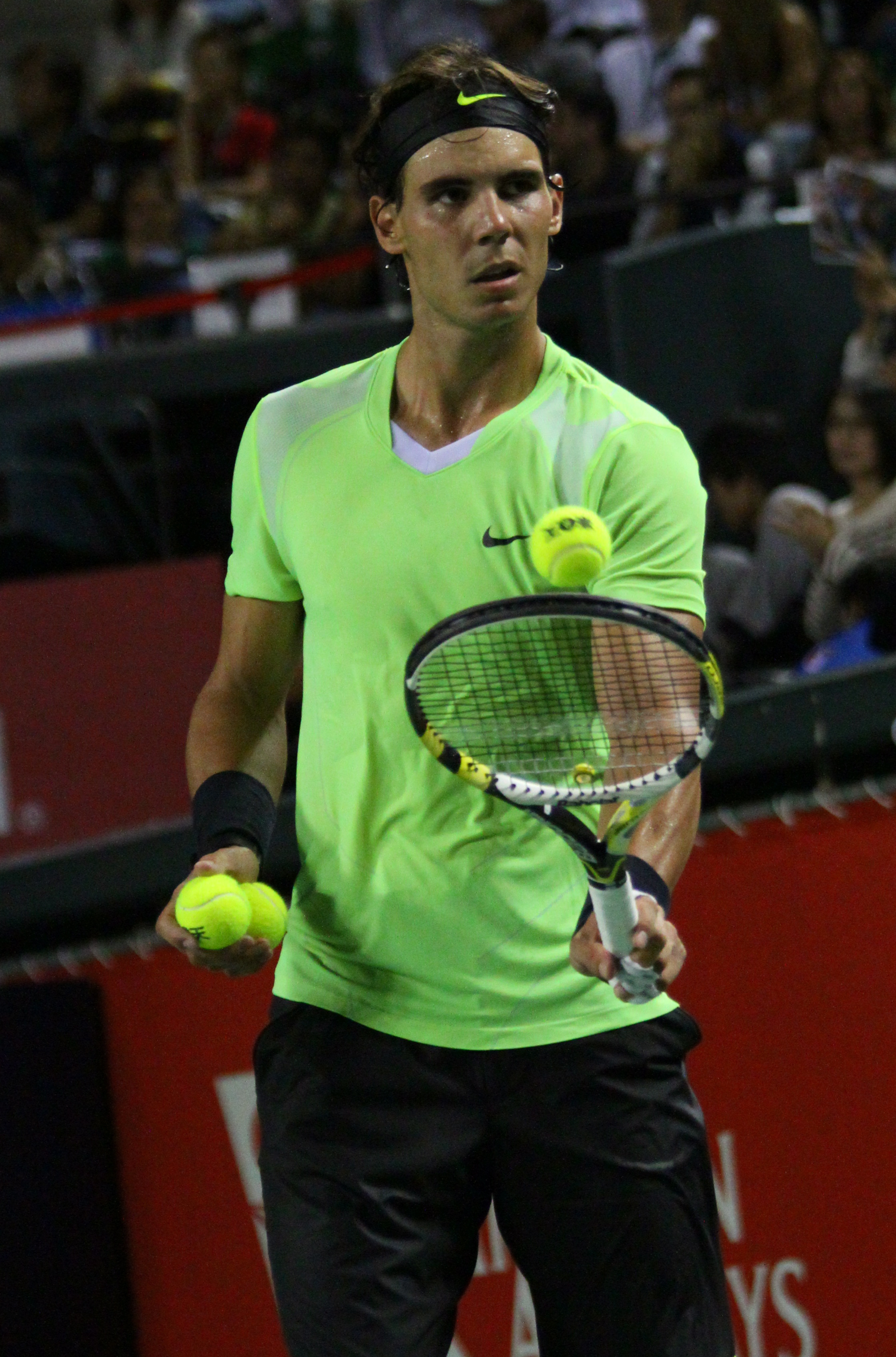
Rafael Nadal was the number one seed in the Men's Singles. He had an opportunity to complete all four Grand Slams at once, but lost to David Ferrer in the quarterfinals.

| Sd | Rk | Player | Points | Points defending | Points won | New points | Status |
|---|---|---|---|---|---|---|---|
| 1 | 1 | (Spain) Rafael Nadal | 12390 | 360 | 360 | 12390 | Quarterfinals lost to (Spain) David Ferrer |
| 2 | 2 | (Switzerland) Roger Federer | 9245 | 2000 | 720 | 7965 | Semifinals lost to (Serbia) Novak Djokovic |
| 3 | 3 | (Serbia) Novak Djokovic | 6240 | 360 | 2000 | 7880 | Champion, won against (United Kingdom) Andy Murray |
| 4 | 4 | (Sweden) Robin Söderling | 5785 | 10 | 180 | 5955 | Fourth round lost to (Ukraine) Alexandr Dolgopolov |
| 5 | 5 | (United Kingdom) Andy Murray | 5760 | 1200 | 1200 | 5760 | Final lost against (Serbia) Novak Djokovic |
| 6 | 6 | (Czech Republic) Tomáš Berdych | 3955 | 45 | 360 | 4270 | Quarterfinals lost to (Serbia) Novak Djokovic |
| 7 | 7 | (Spain) David Ferrer | 3895 | 45 | 720 | 4570 | Semifinals lost to (United Kingdom) Andy Murray |
| 8 | 8 | (United States) Andy Roddick | 3565 | 360 | 180 | 3385 | Fourth round lost to (Switzerland) Stan Wawrinka |
| 9 | 9 | (Spain) Fernando Verdasco | 3240 | 180 | 180 | 3240 | Fourth round lost to (Czech Republic) Tomáš Berdych |
| 10 | 10 | (Russia) Mikhail Youzhny | 2920 | 90 | 90 | 2920 | Third round lost to (Canada) Milos Raonic |
| 11 | 11 | (Austria) Jürgen Melzer | 2785 | 10 | 180 | 2955 | Fourth round lost to (United Kingdom) Andy Murray |
| 12 | 12 | (France) Gaël Monfils | 2560 | 90 | 90 | 2560 | Third round lost to (Switzerland) Stan Wawrinka |
| 13 | 13 | (France) Jo-Wilfried Tsonga | 2345 | 720 | 90 | 1715 | Third round lost to (Ukraine) Alexandr Dolgopolov |
| 14 | 14 | (Spain) Nicolás Almagro | 2160 | 180 | 180 | 2160 | Fourth round lost to (Serbia) Novak Djokovic |
| 15 | 15 | (Croatia) Marin Čilić | 2140 | 720 | 180 | 1600 | Fourth round lost to (Spain) Rafael Nadal |
| 16 | 16 | (United States) Mardy Fish | 1921 | 10 | 45 | 1956 | Second round lost to (Spain) Tommy Robredo |
| 17 | 17 | (Croatia) Ivan Ljubičić | 1965 | 90 | 90 | 1965 | Third round lost to (Spain) Nicolás Almagro |
| 18 | 18 | (United States) Sam Querrey | 1860 | 10 | 10 | 1860 | First round lost to (Poland) Łukasz Kubot |
| 19 | 19 | (Switzerland) Stan Wawrinka | 1855 | 90 | 360 | 2125 | Quarterfinals lost to (Switzerland) Roger Federer |
| 20 | 20 | (United States) John Isner | 1645 | 180 | 90 | 1555 | Third round lost to (Croatia) Marin Čilić |
| 21 | 21 | (Cyprus) Marcos Baghdatis | 1580 | 90 | 90 | 1580 | Third round lost to (Austria) Jürgen Melzer |
| 22 | 22 | (France) Michaël Llodra | 1575 | 45 | 45 | 1575 | Second round lost to (Canada) Milos Raonic |
| 23 | 23 | (Russia) Nikolay Davydenko | 1555 | 360 | 10 | 1205 | First round lost to (Germany) Florian Mayer |
| 24 | 24 | (Latvia) Ernests Gulbis | 1575 | 10 | 10 | 1575 | First round lost to (Germany) Benjamin Becker |
| 25 | 25 | (Spain) Albert Montañés | 1495 | 90 | 45 | 1450 | Second round lost to (Belgium) Xavier Malisse |
| 26 | 26 | (Argentina) Juan Mónaco | 1480 | 90 | 45 | 1435 | Second round lost to (Netherlands) Robin Haase |
| 27 | 27 | (Argentina) David Nalbandian | 1610 | 0 | 45 | 1655 | Second round lost to (Lithuania) Ričardas Berankis |
| 28 | 29 | (France) Richard Gasquet | 1280 | 10 | 90 | 1360 | Third round lost to (Czech Republic) Tomáš Berdych |
| 29 | 30 | (Serbia) Viktor Troicki | 1445 | 45 | 90 | 1535 | Third round lost to (Serbia) Novak Djokovic |
| 30 | 31 | (Brazil) Thomaz Bellucci | 1355 | 45 | 45 | 1355 | Second round lost to (Czech Republic) Jan Hernych |
| 31 | 32 | (Spain) Feliciano López | 1310 | 90 | 45 | 1265 | Second round lost to (Australia) Bernard Tomic |
| 32 | 33 | (Spain) Guillermo García López | 1300 | 10 | 90 | 1380 | Third round lost to (United Kingdom) Andy Murray |

===== Withdrawn players =====
| Rank | Player | Points | Points defending | Points won | New points | Withdrew due to |
|---|---|---|---|---|---|---|
| 28 | (Spain) Juan Carlos Ferrero | 1415 | 10 | 0 | 1405 | Knee and wrist injury |

===== Women's singles =====
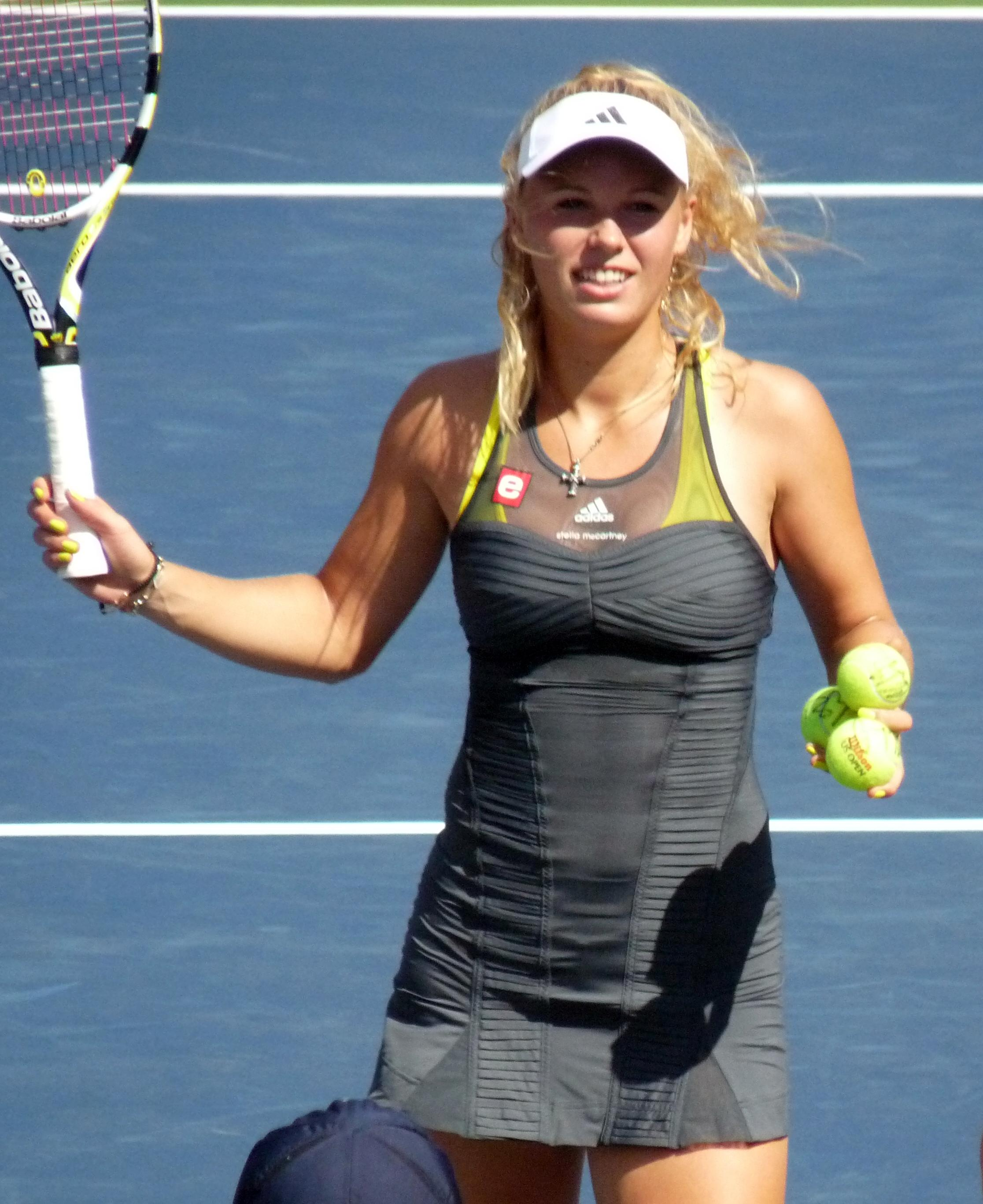
Caroline Wozniacki was the number one seed in the Women's Singles. She lost to eventual runner-up Li Na in the semifinals.

| Seed | Rank | Player | Points before | Points defending | Points won | Points after | Status |
|---|---|---|---|---|---|---|---|
| 1 | 1 | (Denmark) Caroline Wozniacki | 8,035 | 280 | 900 | 8,655 | Semifinals lost to (China) Li Na |
| 2 | 2 | (Russia) Vera Zvonareva | 6,785 | 280 | 900 | 7,405 | Semifinals lost to (Belgium) Kim Clijsters |
| 3 | 3 | (Belgium) Kim Clijsters | 6,675 | 160 | 2,000 | 8,515 | Champion, won against (China) Li Na |
| 4 | 5 | (United States) Venus Williams | 4,985 | 500 | 160 | 4,645 | Third round lost to (Germany) Andrea Petkovic |
| 5 | 6 | (Australia) Samantha Stosur | 4,982 | 280 | 160 | 4,862 | Third round lost to (Czech Republic) Petra Kvitová |
| 6 | 7 | (Italy) Francesca Schiavone | 4,835 | 280 | 500 | 5,055 | Quarterfinals lost to (Denmark) Caroline Wozniacki |
| 7 | 8 | (Serbia) Jelena Janković | 4,445 | 160 | 100 | 4,385 | Second round lost to (China) Peng Shuai |
| 8 | 9 | (Belarus) Victoria Azarenka | 4,155 | 500 | 280 | 3,935 | Fourth round lost to (China) Li Na |
| 9 | 11 | (China) Li Na | 3,950 | 900 | 1,400 | 4,450 | Final lost to (Belgium) Kim Clijsters |
| 10 | 12 | (Israel) Shahar Pe'er | 3,225 | 160 | 160 | 3,225 | Third round lost to (Italy) Flavia Pennetta |
| 11 | 13 | (Belgium) Justine Henin | 3,215 | 1,400 | 160 | 0^{†} | Third round lost to (Russia) Svetlana Kuznetsova |
| 12 | 14 | (Poland) Agnieszka Radwańska | 3,000 | 160 | 500 | 3,340 | Quarterfinals lost to (Belgium) Kim Clijsters |
| 13 | 15 | (Russia) Nadia Petrova | 2,702 | 500 | 160 | 2,362 | Third round lost to (Russia) Ekaterina Makarova |
| 14 | 16 | (Russia) Maria Sharapova | 2,661 | 5 | 280 | 2,936 | Fourth round lost (Germany) Andrea Petkovic |
| 15 | 17 | (France) Marion Bartoli | 2,655 | 160 | 100 | 2,595 | Second round lost to (Russia) Vesna Manasieva |
| 16 | 18 | (Russia) Anastasia Pavlyuchenkova | 2,585 | 100 | 160 | 2,645 | Third round lost to (Czech Republic) Iveta Benešová |
| 17 | 22 | (France) Aravane Rezaï | 2,445 | 100 | 5 | 2,350 | First round lost to (Czech Republic) Barbora Záhlavová-Strýcová |
| 18 | 19 | (Russia) Maria Kirilenko | 2,540 | 500 | 100 | 2,140 | Second round lost to (Czech Republic) Iveta Benešová |
| 19 | 20 | (Serbia) Ana Ivanovic | 2,500 | 100 | 5 | 2,405 | First round lost to (Russia) Ekaterina Makarova |
| 20 | 21 | (Estonia) Kaia Kanepi | 2,460 | 100 | 100 | 2,460 | Second round lost to (Germany) Julia Görges |
| 21 | 24 | (Belgium) Yanina Wickmayer | 2,370 | 280 | 100 | 2,190 | Second round lost to (Latvia) Anastasija Sevastova |
| 22 | 25 | (Italy) Flavia Pennetta | 2,355 | 100 | 280 | 2,535 | Fourth round lost to (Czech Republic) Petra Kvitová |
| 23 | 26 | (Russia) Svetlana Kuznetsova | 2,310 | 280 | 280 | 2,310 | Fourth round lost to (Italy) Francesca Schiavone |
| 24 | 23 | (Russia) Alisa Kleybanova | 2,420 | 160 | 100 | 2,360 | Second round lost to (Romania) Simona Halep |
| 25 | 28 | (Czech Republic) Petra Kvitová | 2,018 | 100 | 500 | 2,418 | Quarterfinals lost to (Russia) Vera Zvonareva |
| 26 | 29 | (Spain) María José Martínez Sánchez | 2,010 | 100 | 100 | 2,010 | Second round lost to (France) Alizé Cornet |
| 27 | 30 | (Romania) Alexandra Dulgheru | 2,000 | 5 | 5 | 2,000 | First round lost to (Japan) Ayumi Morita |
| 28 | 31 | (Slovakia) Daniela Hantuchová | 1,945 | 160 | 5 | 1,790 | First round lost to (Russia) Regina Kulikova |
| 29 | 32 | (Slovakia) Dominika Cibulková | 1,905 | 5 | 160 | 2,060 | Third round lost to (Denmark) Caroline Wozniacki |
| 30 | 33 | (Germany) Andrea Petkovic | 1,890 | 100 | 500 | 2,290 | Quarterfinals lost to (China) Li Na |
| 31 | 35 | (Czech Republic) Lucie Šafářová | 1,780 | 5 | 160 | 1,935 | Third round lost to (Russia) Vera Zvonareva |
| 32 | 36 | (Bulgaria) Tsvetana Pironkova | 1,722 | 100 | 100 | 1,722 | Second round lost to (Romania) Monica Niculescu |

† The player retired from professional tennis and requested to be removed from the WTA rankings at the end of the tournament.

===== Withdrawn players =====
The following players would have been seeded, but withdrew before the tournament began.

| Rank | Player | Points before | Points defending | Points after | Withdrawal reason |
|---|---|---|---|---|---|
| 4 | (United States) Serena Williams | 5,035 | 2,000 | 3,035 | Foot injury |
| 27 | (China) Zheng Jie | 2,158 | 900 | 1,258 | Wrist injury |

==== Main draw wildcard entries ====
Tennis Australia awarded eight wildcards for the men's and women's professional singles competitions. Former Australian Grand Slam champions, Pat Rafter and Todd Woodbridge helped to select the four discretionary wildcards in the men's draw. In an agreement with the United States Tennis Association, Tennis Australia gave one man and one woman from the United States a wildcard into the Australian Open. Tennis Australia also has a similar agreement with the French Tennis Federation. The Australian Open is promoted as "the Grand Slam of Asia/Pacific"; one male and one female player from this geographical area was awarded a wildcard. The final wildcard was awarded to the winner of the Australian Open wildcard playoff, a tournament between Australian players, who do not receive direct entry into the draw. Below is a list of players and teams who received wildcard entries into the main draw.

===== Men's singles wildcard entries =====
1. (Australia) Carsten Ball
2. (India) Somdev Devvarman
3. (Australia) Matthew Ebden
4. (United States) Ryan Harrison
5. (Australia) Peter Luczak
6. (Australia) Marinko Matosevic
7. (France) Benoît Paire
8. (Australia) Bernard Tomic

===== Women's singles wildcard entries =====
1. (Japan) ~~Junri Namigata~~ → (Chinese Taipei) Chang Kai-chen
2. (United States) Lauren Davis
3. (Australia) Jelena Dokic
4. (Australia) Sophie Ferguson
5. (France) ~~Virginie Razzano~~ → (France) Caroline Garcia
6. (Australia) Alicia Molik
7. (Australia) Sally Peers
8. (Australia) Olivia Rogowska

===== Men's doubles wildcard entries =====
1. (Australia) Carsten Ball / (Australia) Chris Guccione
2. (Australia) James Duckworth / (Australia) Benjamin Mitchell
3. (Australia) Colin Ebelthite / (Australia) Adam Feeney
4. (Australia) Matthew Ebden / (Australia) Peter Luczak
5. (Australia) Samuel Groth / (Australia) Greg Jones
6. (Australia) James Lemke / (Australia) Matt Reid
7. (Australia) Marinko Matosevic / (Australia) John Millman

===== Women's doubles wildcard entries =====
1. (Australia) Monique Adamczak / (Australia) Isabella Holland
2. (Australia) Jelena Dokic / (Australia) Sally Peers
3. (Australia) Daniella Dominikovic / (Australia) Jessica Moore
4. (Australia) Sophie Ferguson / (Australia) Alicia Molik
5. (Australia) Jade Hopper / (Australia) Monika Wejnert
6. (Australia) Sophie Letcher / (Australia) Viktorija Rajicic
7. (Australia) Tammi Patterson / (Australia) Olivia Rogowska

===== Mixed doubles wildcard entries =====
1. (Australia) Sophie Ferguson / (Australia) Marinko Matosevic
2. (Australia) Jarmila Groth / (Australia) Samuel Groth
3. (Croatia) Mirjana Lučić / (Australia) Bernard Tomic
4. (Australia) Alicia Molik / (Australia) Peter Luczak
5. (Australia) Sally Peers / (Australia) Carsten Ball
6. (Australia) Olivia Rogowska / (Australia) Matthew Ebden
7. (Australia) Rennae Stubbs / (Australia) Chris Guccione

==== Protected ranking ====
The following players were accepted directly into the main draw using a protected ranking:

Men's Singles

- (Argentina) Juan Martín del Potro
- (Russia) Dmitry Tursunov

==== Qualifiers entries ====
In the men's singles one hundred and twenty eight players, including eight wildcards competed for sixteen entries into the main draw of the 2011 Australian Open. Matches commenced on 12 January and concluded on 15 January 2011, with players required to win three matches to qualify. On the second day of qualifying, the entire schedule was washed out by rain. This was the first time since the Australian Open moved to Melbourne Park from Kooyong in 1988 that play has failed to take place on at least one court. Below is a list of qualifiers for the main draw of the men's and women's singles events.

===== Men's singles qualifiers entries =====
1. (Italy) Flavio Cipolla
2. (Italy) Marco Crugnola
3. (Canada) Frank Dancevic
4. (Bulgaria) Grigor Dimitrov
5. (Germany) Denis Gremelmayr
6. (Czech Republic) Jan Hernych
7. (Slovenia) Blaž Kavčič
8. (France) Nicolas Mahut
9. (France) Vincent Millot
10. (Luxembourg) Gilles Müller
11. (Canada) Milos Raonic
12. (France) Stéphane Robert
13. (Germany) Simon Stadler
14. (United States) Ryan Sweeting
15. (United States) Donald Young
16. (Slovenia) Grega Žemlja

The following players received entry from a lucky loser spot:

1. (Germany) Simon Greul

===== Women's singles qualifiers entries =====
1. (United States) Irina Falconi
2. (United States) Jamie Hampton
3. (United Kingdom) Anne Keothavong
4. (Luxembourg) Anne Kremer
5. (Russia) Vesna Manasieva
6. (Croatia) Petra Martić
7. (India) Sania Mirza
8. (Russia) Arina Rodionova
9. (Netherlands) Arantxa Rus
10. (Ukraine) Lesia Tsurenko
11. (United States) CoCo Vandeweghe
12. (Germany) Kathrin Wörle

=== Withdrawals ===
The following players were accepted directly into the main tournament, but withdrew with injuries.

==== Men's singles ====
| Original player | Replacement |
|---|---|
| (France) Julien Benneteau | (Germany) Simon Greul |
| (Spain) Juan Carlos Ferrero | (Slovakia) Karol Beck |
| (Chile) Fernando González | (Germany) Daniel Brands |
| (France) Paul-Henri Mathieu | (Colombia) Alejandro Falla |

==== Women's singles ====
| Original player | Replacement |
|---|---|
| (Ukraine) Alona Bondarenko | (Russia) Evgeniya Rodina |
| (Austria) Yvonne Meusburger | (United States) Alison Riske |
| (Kazakhstan) Yaroslava Shvedova | (France) Virginie Razzano |
| (Hungary) Ágnes Szávay | (Italy) Maria Elena Camerin |
| (United States) Serena Williams | (Czech Republic) Lucie Hradecká |
| (China) Zheng Jie | (Japan) Junri Namigata |

=== Juniors ===
Below is a list of the sixteen seeds for the boys and girls singles and the eight qualifiers for each event.

==== Singles seeds ====
===== Boys' singles =====
| Sd | Rk | Player |
|---|---|---|
| 1 | 1 | (Czech Republic) Jiří Veselý |
| 2 | 3 | (Austria) Dominic Thiem |
| 3 | 5 | (Croatia) Mate Pavić |
| 4 | 8 | (United Kingdom) George Morgan |
| 5 | 7 | (Belgium) Joris De Loore |
| 6 | 9 | (Spain) Roberto Carballés |
| 7 | 10 | (Australia) Ben Wagland |
| 8 | 12 | (Philippines) Jeson Patrombon |
| 9 | 19 | (Brazil) Bruno Sant'anna |
| 10 | 16 | (Australia) Andrew Whittington |
| 11 | 18 | (Slovakia) Filip Horanský |
| 12 | 20 | (Switzerland) Dimitri Bretting |
| 13 | 23 | (Serbia) Nikola Milojević |
| 14 | 22 | (Croatia) Mate Delić |
| 15 | 25 | (Australia) Sean Berman |
| 16 | 29 | (Czech Republic) Lukáš Vrňák |

===== Girls' singles =====
| Sd | Rk | Player |
|---|---|---|
| 1 | 1 | (Russia) Daria Gavrilova |
| 2 | 5 | (Belgium) An-Sophie Mestach |
| 3 | 3 | (United States) Lauren Davis |
| 4 | 6 | (Russia) Irina Khromacheva |
| 5 | 4 | (Puerto Rico) Monica Puig |
| 6 | 7 | (China) Zheng Saisai |
| 7 | 8 | (Russia) Yulia Putintseva |
| 8 | 13 | (France) Caroline Garcia |
| 9 | 12 | (Serbia) Natalija Kostić |
| 10 | 20 | (Montenegro) Danka Kovinić |
| 11 | 16 | (Japan) Maho Kowase |
| 12 | NA | (Serbia) Nikola Milojević |
| 13 | 23 | (Belarus) Ilona Kremen |
| 14 | 21 | (Canada) Eugenie Bouchard |
| 15 | 25 | (Ukraine) Ganna Poznikhirenko |
| 16 | 28 | (Slovenia) Nastja Kolar |

==== Qualifier entries ====
Qualifying for the junior events took place between 20 and 21 January 2011 at the Pakenham Regional Tennis Centre.

===== Boys' singles qualifiers entries =====
1. (Spain) Axel Álvarez Llamas
2. (Romania) Darius Florin Brăguși
3. (New Zealand) Jaden Grinter
4. (Australia) Thanasi Kokkinakis
5. (Spain) Oriol Roca Batalla
6. (Brazil) Bruno Sant'Anna
7. (United States) Mac Styslinger
8. (France) Thomas Szewczyk

===== Girls' singles qualifiers entries =====
1. (Uzbekistan) Nigina Abduraimova
2. (Japan) Mana Ayukawa
3. (Australia) Teiwa Casey
4. (Australia) Azra Hadzic
5. (Australia) Abbie Myers
6. (Japan) Riko Sawayanagi
7. (Japan) Kanami Tsuji
8. (Belarus) Natallia Vavulina

=== Wheelchair tennis ===
Below is a list of the seeds for the singles tournaments of the wheelchair tennis event.

==== Singles seeds ====
===== Men's singles =====
| Sd | Rk | Player |
|---|---|---|
| 1 | 1 | (Japan) Shingo Kunieda |
| 2 | 2 | (France) Stéphane Houdet |

===== Women's singles =====
| Sd | Rk | Player |
|---|---|---|
| 1 | 1 | (Netherlands) Esther Vergeer |
| 2 | 2 | (Australia) Daniela Di Toro |

===== Quad singles =====
| Sd | Rk | Player |
|---|---|---|
| 1 | 1 | (United States) David Wagner |
| 2 | 2 | (United Kingdom) Peter Norfolk |

| Preceded by 2010 US Open | Grand Slams | Succeeded by 2011 French Open |
