= Sophie Ferguson =

Australian tennis player

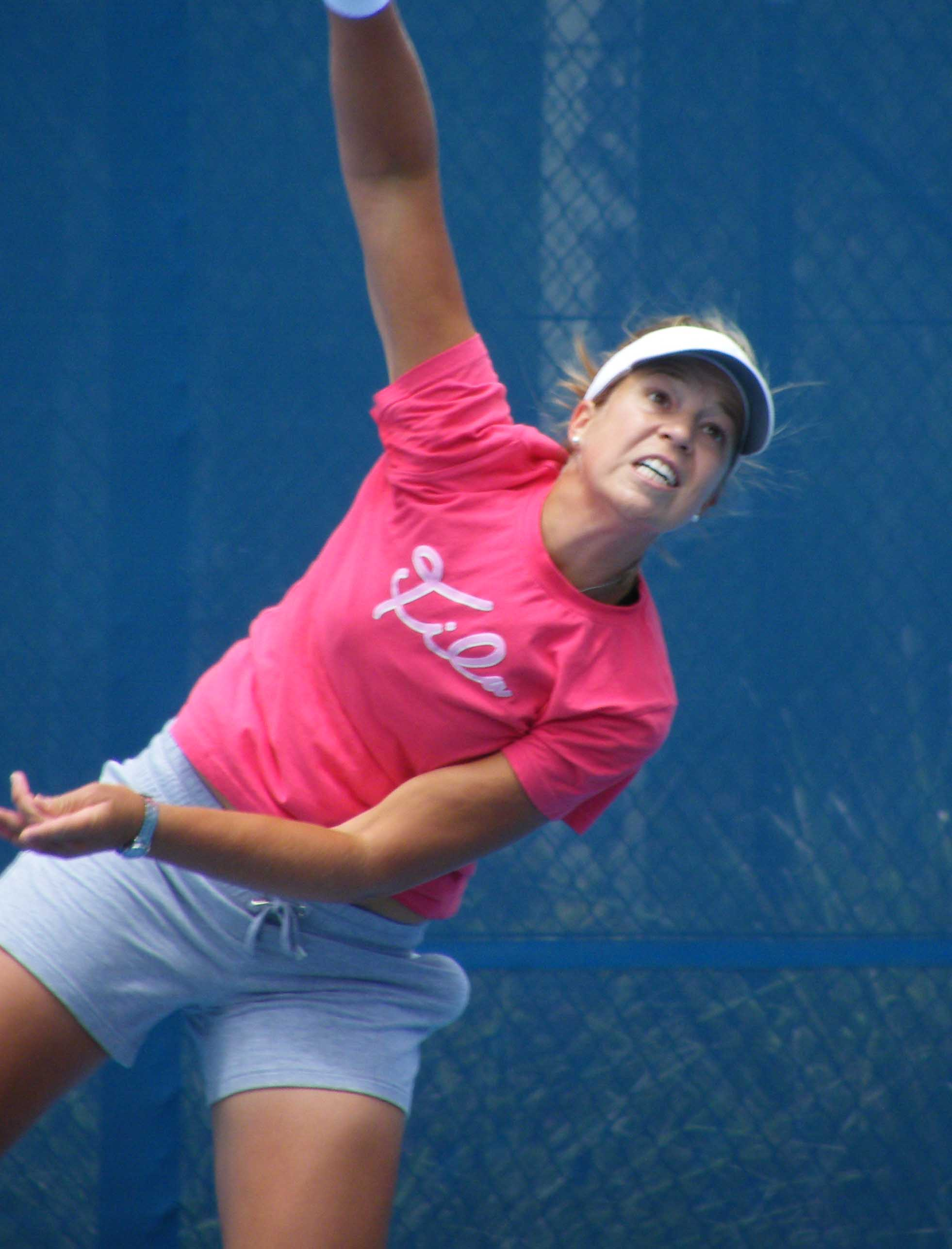
- Ferguson, 2009
- Country (sports): Australia
- Residence: Sydney, New South Wales
- Born: 19 March 1986 (age 40) Sydney, New South Wales
- Height: 1.77 m (5 ft 10 in)
- Turned pro: 2002
- Retired: 2012
- Plays: Right (one-handed backhand)
- Prize money: $438,917

Singles
- Career record: 248–186
- Career titles: 3 ITF
- Highest ranking: No. 109 (19 July 2010)

Grand Slam singles results
- Australian Open: 2R (2005)
- French Open: 2R (2010)
- Wimbledon: Q2 (2011)
- US Open: 1R (2010)

Doubles
- Career record: 100–97
- Career titles: 6 ITF
- Highest ranking: No. 148 (8 October 2007)

Grand Slam doubles results
- Australian Open: 2R (2006 & 2011)

Sophie Ferguson (born 19 March 1986) is an Australian former professional tennis player.

She won nine titles on the ITF Women's Circuit (six in doubles) and played on the WTA Tour. She reached a career-high singles ranking of world No. 109 on 19 July 2010, and best ranking in doubles of 148 on 8 October 2007. She retired from tour in 2012.

Ferguson has undergone coaching from Australian Tony Roche.

== Career ==
In 2005, Ferguson got entry in the 2005 Australian Open as a wildcard. She defeated Nuria Llagostera Vives in the first round, before falling to Nadia Petrova in the second.

At the 2007 Australian Open, she defeated former world No. 8, Ai Sugiyama. She received a wildcard to compete in the 2007 Indian Open but lost in the first round against Jelena Kostanić Tošić.

She played at the 2009 Korea Open, and won through qualifying, before losing to former champion, Maria Kirilenko.

In 2010, Ferguson got entry in the French Open as a qualifier. In the first round, she defeated Petra Kvitová, before losing in the second to eventual champion, Francesca Schiavone.

== ITF Circuit finals ==
$100,000 tournaments
$50,000 tournaments
$25,000 tournaments

=== Singles (3–9) ===
Outcome	No.	Date	Tournament	Surface	Opponent	Score
Runner-up	1.	16 May 2004	ITF Karuizawa, Japan	Carpet	(Indonesia) Wynne Prakusya	3–6, 2–6
Runner-up	2.	19 February 2006	ITF Sydney, Australia	Hard	(Slovakia) Jarmila Gajdošová	4–6, 6–3, 6–7
Runner-up	3.	26 March 2006	ITF Melbourne, Australia	Clay	(Chinese Taipei) Chan Yung-jan	3–6, 6–7
Winner	1.	5 August 2007	ITF Obihiro, Japan	Carpet	(Japan) Ayumi Morita	6–4, 6–3
Winner	2.	13 September 2007	ITF Tokyo Open, Japan	Hard	(China) Zhao Yijing	6–2, 6–4
Runner-up	4.	14 October 2007	ITF Rockhampton, Australia	Hard	(New Zealand) Marina Erakovic	6–7, 5–7
Runner-up	5.	21 October 2007	ITF Gympie, Australia	Hard	(New Zealand) Marina Erakovic	6–4, 4–6, 6–7
Runner-up	6.	29 March 2009	ITF Hammond, United States	Hard	(United States) Kristie Ahn	6–0, 4–6, 4–6
Runner-up	7.	27 June 2009	ITF Périgueux, France	Clay	(Ukraine) Julia Vakulenko	2–6, 5–7
Winner	3.	16 August 2009	Industrial Bank Cup, China	Hard	(Chinese Taipei) Chan Yung-jan	6–3, 6–1
Runner-up	8.	21 March 2010	ITF Fort Walton Beach, United States	Hard	(South Africa) Chanelle Scheepers	5–7, 5–7
Runner-up	9.	10 July 2010	Open de Biarritz, France	Clay	(Germany) Julia Görges	2–6, 2–6

=== Doubles (6–7) ===
Outcome	No.	Date	Tournament	Surface	Partner	Opponents	Score
Runner-up	1.	14 August 2005	ITF Wuxi, China	Hard	(Australia) Casey Dellacqua	(South Korea) Jeon Mi-ra (Indonesia) Wynne Prakusya	2–6, 6–7^{(6)}
Runner-up	2.	12 November 2006	ITF Mount Gambier, Australia	Hard	(Australia) Daniella Dominikovic	(South Africa) Natalie Grandin (Australia) Christina Wheeler	4–6, 6–4, 4–6
Runner-up	3.	20 April 2007	ITF Bari, Italy	Clay	(Slovakia) Katarína Kachlíková	(Ukraine) Veronika Kapshay (Ukraine) Mariya Koryttseva	5–7, 2–6
Winner	1.	19 June 2007	ITF Noto, Japan	Carpet	(United States) Anne Yelsey	(Japan) Natsumi Hamamura (Japan) Mari Tanaka	7–6^{(8)}, 6–1
Runner-up	4.	16 November 2007	ITF Nuriootpa, Australia	Hard	(Australia) Trudi Musgrave	(South Africa) Natalie Grandin (United States) Robin Stephenson	4–6, 5–7
Runner-up	5.	23 May 2007	ITF Mount Gambier, Australia	Hard	(Australia) Trudi Musgrave	(Germany) Antonia Matic (Romania) Monica Niculescu	7–5, 3–6, [8–10]
Runner-up	6.	16 May 2008	ITF Caserta, Italy	Clay	(Australia) Christina Wheeler	(China) Han Xinyun (China) Xu Yifan	6–4, 4–6, [8–10]
Winner	2.	3 May 2009	Kangaroo Cup, Japan	Carpet	(Japan) Aiko Nakamura	(Japan) Misaki Doi (Japan) Kurumi Nara	6–2, 6–1
Winner	3.	6 June 2009	ITF Brno, Czech Republic	Clay	(Australia) Trudi Musgrave	(Slovakia) Karin Morgosova (Slovakia) Romana Tabak	6–4, 6–1
Runner-up	7.	5 March 2010	ITF Sydney, Australia	Hard	(Australia) Trudi Musgrave	(Australia) Casey Dellacqua (Australia) Jessica Moore	w/o
Winner	4.	25 June 2010	ITF Rome, Italy	Clay	(Australia) Trudi Musgrave	(Italy) Claudia Giovine (Italy) Valentina Sulpizio	6–0, 6–3
Winner	5.	9 May 2011	ITF Reggio Emilia, Italy	Clay	(Australia) Sally Peers	(Italy) Claudia Giovine (Argentina) María Irigoyen	6–4, 6–1
Winner	6.	30 May 2011	ITF Rome, Italy	Clay	(Australia) Sally Peers	(Poland) Magda Linette (Romania) Liana Ungur	w/o
