= 2007 Estoril Open =

- Date: 30 April – 6 May
- Edition: 18th(ATP) / 11th(WTA)
- Surface: Clay / outdoor
- Location: Oeiras, Portugal
- Venue: Estádio Nacional

Champions

Men's singles
- (Serbia) Novak Djokovic

Women's singles
- (Germany) Gréta Arn

Men's doubles
- (Brazil) Marcelo Melo / (Brazil) André Sá

Women's doubles
- (Romania) Andreea Ehritt-Vanc / (Russia) Anastasia Rodionova
← 2006 ·	Estoril Open	· 2008 →

The 2007 Estoril Open was a combined men's and women's tennis tournament played on outdoor clay courts. It was the 18th edition of the Estoril Open for the men (the 11th for the women), and was part of the International Series of the 2007 ATP Tour, and of the Tier IV Series of the 2007 WTA Tour. Both the men's and the women's events took place at the Estádio Nacional in Oeiras, Portugal, from 30 April through 6 May 2007.

== Finals ==
=== Men's singles ===
(Serbia) Novak Djokovic defeated (France) Richard Gasquet, 7–6^{(9–7)}, 0–6, 6–1

=== Women's singles ===
(Germany) Gréta Arn defeated (Belarus) Victoria Azarenka, 2–6, 6–1, 7–6^{(7–3)}

=== Men's doubles ===
(Brazil) Marcelo Melo / (Brazil) André Sá defeated (Argentina) Martín García / (Argentina) Sebastián Prieto, 3–6, 6–2, [10–6]

=== Women's doubles ===
(Romania) Andreea Ehritt-Vanc / (Russia) Anastasia Rodionova defeated (Spain) Lourdes Domínguez Lino / (Spain) Arantxa Parra Santonja, 6–3, 6–2
