= 2007 Estoril Open – Women's doubles =

Women's doubles
- 2007 Estoril Open

Final
- Champion: (Romania) Andreea Ehritt-Vanc; (Russia) Anastasia Rodionova
- Runner-up: (Spain) Lourdes Domínguez Lino; (Spain) Arantxa Parra Santonja
- Score: 6-3, 6-2

Events
Singles	men	women
Doubles	men	women
- Estoril Open

Li Ting and Sun Tiantian were the defending champions, but both chose not to participate that year.

== Seeds ==
1. (Argentina) Gisela Dulko / (Italy) Flavia Pennetta (first round)
2. (France) Marion Bartoli / (Russia) Maria Kirilenko (first round)
3. (Greece) Eleni Daniilidou / (Germany) Jasmin Wöhr (semifinals, retired due to Daniilidou' s left calf strain)
4. (Romania) Andreea Ehritt-Vanc / (Russia) Anastasia Rodionova (champions)

== Draw ==
Key

- Q = Qualifier
- WC = Wild card
- LL = Lucky loser
- Alt = Alternate
- ITF = ITF entry
- PR = Protected ranking
- SR = Special ranking
- SE = Special exempt
- JE = Junior exempt
- JR = Junior Accelerator Programme entrant
- CO = College Accelerator Programme entrant
- NG = Next Gen Accelerator Program entrant
- w/o = Walkover
- r = Retired
- d = Defaulted

=== Draw ===
First round

Quarterfinals

Semifinals

Finals

1
- (Argentina) G Dulko
- (Italy) F Pennetta
6
4
[8]

- (Spain) L Domínguez Lino
- (Spain) A Parra Santonja
3
6
[10]

1
- (Spain) L Domínguez Lino
- (Spain) A Parra Santonja
6
7^{8}

- (Germany) J Schruff
- (Czech Republic) B Záhlavová-Strýcová
4

- (Germany) J Schruff
- (Czech Republic) B Záhlavová-Strýcová
0
6^{6}

- (Germany) G Arn
- (France) C Pin
1^{r}

- (Spain) L Domínguez Lino
- (Spain) A Parra Santonja
w/o

3
- (Greece) E Daniilidou
- (Germany) J Wöhr
6
3
[10]

3
- (Greece) E Daniilidou
- (Germany) J Wöhr

- (Italy) A Brianti
- (Georgia (country)) M Chakhnashvili
3
7
[8]

3
- (Greece) E Daniilidou
- (Germany) J Wöhr
w/o

- (Italy) S Errani
- (Spain) C Martínez Granados
7
6

- (Italy) S Errani
- (Spain) C Martínez Granados

- (Spain) N Llagostera Vives
- (Germany) M Müller
5
1

- (Spain) L Domínguez Lino
- (Spain) A Parra Santonja
3
2

- (Portugal) N Silva
- (Spain) C Suárez Navarro
7
6^{3}
[7]

4
- (Romania) A Ehritt-Vanc
- (Russia) An Rodionova
6
6

WC
- (Portugal) AC Nogueira
- (Portugal) F Piedade
5
7^{7}
[10]

WC
- (Portugal) AC Nogueira
- (Portugal) F Piedade
2
4

- (Belarus) V Azarenka
- (Denmark) C Wozniacki
6
4
[11]

4
- (Romania) A Ehritt-Vanc
- (Russia) An Rodionova
6
6

4
- (Romania) A Ehritt-Vanc
- (Russia) An Rodionova
3
6
[13]

4
- (Romania) A Ehritt-Vanc
- (Russia) An Rodionova
6
6

- (United States) N Uberoi
- (India) S Uberoi
4
6^{3}

- (Kazakhstan) A Rakhim
- (Russia) Ar Rodionova
3
2

- (Kazakhstan) A Rakhim
- (Russia) Ar Rodionova
6
7^{7}

- (Kazakhstan) A Rakhim
- (Russia) Ar Rodionova
7^{8}
2
6

- (France) S Cohen-Aloro
- (Tunisia) S Sfar
6
3
[10]

- (France) S Cohen-Aloro
- (Tunisia) S Sfar
6^{6}
6
1

2
- (France) M Bartoli
- (Russia) M Kirilenko
2
6
[7]
