= 2008 Estoril Open – Men's doubles =

Men's doubles
- 2008 Estoril Open

Final
- Champions: (South Africa) Jeff Coetzee; (South Africa) Wesley Moodie
- Runners-up: (United Kingdom) Jamie Murray; (Zimbabwe) Kevin Ullyett
- Score: 6–2, 4–6, [10–8]

Details
- Draw: 16
- Seeds: 4

Events
Singles	men	women
Doubles	men	women
← 2007 ·	Estoril Open	· 2009 →

Marcelo Melo and André Sá were the defending champions, but Sa chose not to participate, and only Melo competed that year.
Melo partnered with Sebastián Prieto, but lost in the quarterfinals to Yves Allegro and Nicolas Mahut.

Jeff Coetzee and Wesley Moodie won in the final 6–2, 4–6, [10–8], against Jamie Murray and Kevin Ullyett.

== Seeds ==
1. (South Africa) Jeff Coetzee / (South Africa) Wesley Moodie (champions)
2. (United Kingdom) Jamie Murray / (Zimbabwe) Kevin Ullyett (final)
3. (Czech Republic) František Čermák / (Australia) Jordan Kerr (semifinals)
4. (Brazil) Marcelo Melo / (Argentina) Sebastián Prieto (quarterfinals)

== Draw ==
Key

- Q = Qualifier
- WC = Wild card
- LL = Lucky loser
- Alt = Alternate
- ITF = ITF entry
- PR = Protected ranking
- SR = Special ranking
- SE = Special exempt
- JE = Junior exempt
- JR = Junior Accelerator Programme entrant
- CO = College Accelerator Programme entrant
- NG = Next Gen Accelerator Program entrant
- w/o = Walkover
- r = Retired
- d = Defaulted

=== Draw ===
First round

Quarterfinals

Semifinals

Final

1
- (South Africa) J Coetzee
- (South Africa) W Moodie
6
7^{7}

- (Austria) O Marach
- (Slovakia) M Mertiňák
3
6^{5}

1
- (South Africa) J Coetzee
- (South Africa) W Moodie
6
6^{7}
[10]

- (Sweden) R Lindstedt
- (Finland) J Nieminen
6
6

- (Sweden) R Lindstedt
- (Finland) J Nieminen
2
7^{9}
[6]

WC
- (Portugal) G Elias
- (Portugal) L Tavares
4
3

1
- (South Africa) J Coetzee
- (South Africa) W Moodie
5
6
[10]

4
- (Brazil) M Melo
- (Argentina) S Prieto
6
6

- (Switzerland) Y Allegro
- (France) N Mahut
7
4
[6]

WC
- (Portugal) F Gil
- (Portugal) R Machado
2
1

4
- (Brazil) M Melo
- (Argentina) S Prieto
4
6
[9]

- (Switzerland) Y Allegro
- (France) N Mahut
6
7

- (Switzerland) Y Allegro
- (France) N Mahut
6
3
[11]

ALT
- (Italy) S Vagnozzi
- (Russia) A Golubev
1
5

1
- (South Africa) J Coetzee
- (South Africa) W Moodie
6
4
[10]

- (Italy) F Cipolla
- (Russia) A Kudryavtsev
6^{4}
3

2
- (United Kingdom) J Murray
- (Zimbabwe) K Ullyett
2
6
[8]

- (Austria) A Peya
- (Croatia) L Zovko
7^{7}
6

- (Austria) A Peya
- (Croatia) L Zovko
6^{8}
4

- (Germany) M Berrer
- (Germany) D Gremelmayr
4
2

3
- (Czech Republic) F Čermák
- (Australia) J Kerr
7^{10}
6

3
- (Czech Republic) F Čermák
- (Australia) J Kerr
6
6

3
- (Czech Republic) F Čermák
- (Australia) J Kerr
6
4
[6]

- (Serbia) B Pašanski
- (Belgium) O Rochus
1
2

2
- (United Kingdom) J Murray
- (Zimbabwe) K Ullyett
3
6
[10]

- (Czech Republic) I Minář
- (Czech Republic) J Vaněk
6
6

- (Czech Republic) I Minář
- (Czech Republic) J Vaněk
3
1

- (Austria) J Knowle
- (Austria) J Melzer
2
7^{7}
[6]

2
- (United Kingdom) J Murray
- (Zimbabwe) K Ullyett
6
6

2
- (United Kingdom) J Murray
- (Zimbabwe) K Ullyett
6
6^{5}
[10]
