= 2007 Estoril Open – Men's singles =

Men's singles
- 2007 Estoril Open

Final
- Champion: (Serbia) Novak Djokovic
- Runner-up: (France) Richard Gasquet
- Score: 7–6^{(9–7)}, 0–6, 6–1

Details
- Draw: 32 (4Q / 3WC)
- Seeds: 8

Events
Singles	men	women
Doubles	men	women
← 2006 ·	Estoril Open	· 2008 →

Novak Djokovic defeated Richard Gasquet 7–6^{(9–7)}, 0–6, 6–1 to win the 2007 Estoril Open singles event.

== Seeds ==
1. (Russia) Nikolay Davydenko (first round)
2. (Spain) Tommy Robredo (semifinals)
3. (Serbia) Novak Djokovic (champion)
4. (Chile) Fernando González (first round)
5. (France) Richard Gasquet (final)
6. (Russia) Dmitry Tursunov (second round)
7. (Argentina) Agustín Calleri (quarterfinals)
8. (France) Gaël Monfils (first round)

== Draw ==
=== Key ===
- Q = Qualifier
- WC = Wild card
- LL = Lucky loser
- Alt = Alternate
- SE = Special exempt
- PR = Protected ranking
- ITF = ITF entry
- JE = Junior exempt
- w/o = Walkover
- r = Retired
- d = Defaulted
- SR = Special ranking

=== Finals ===
Semifinals
5	(France) Richard Gasquet	3
(France) Paul-Henri Mathieu	1^{r}
3	(Serbia) Novak Djokovic	7	6
2	(Spain) Tommy Robredo	5	1

Final
5	(France) Richard Gasquet	6^{7}	6	1
3	(Serbia) Novak Djokovic	7^{9}	0	6

=== Top half ===
First round
1	(Russia) N Davydenko	5	1
Q	(France) O Patience	7	6
(Russia) T Gabashvili	1	7	4
(United States) V Spadea	6	5	6
WC	(Portugal) F Gil	6	4	6
(Spain) R Ramírez Hidalgo	1	6	3
(Belarus) M Mirnyi	3	3
5	(France) R Gasquet	6	6
4	(Chile) F González	2	4
(France) PH Mathieu	6	6
(Russia) I Kunitsyn	6	6
WC	(Portugal) P Sousa	1	1
(Peru) L Horna	6^{5}	4
(United States) S Querrey	7^{7}	6
(Argentina) J Mónaco	7	1	6
8	(France) G Monfils	5	6	2

Second round
Q	(France) O Patience	6	3	4
(United States) V Spadea	2	6	6
WC	(Portugal) F Gil	1	2
5	(France) R Gasquet	6	6
(France) P-H Mathieu	6	6
(Russia) I Kunitsyn	2	1
(United States) S Querrey	6	1	4
(Argentina) J Mónaco	3	6	6

Quarterfinals
(United States) V Spadea	3	4
5	(France) R Gasquet	6	6
(France) PH Mathieu	6	4	6
(Argentina) J Mónaco	4	6	1

Semifinals
5	(France) R Gasquet	3
(France) PH Mathieu	1^{r}

=== Bottom half ===
First round
6	(Russia) D Tursunov	4	6	6
(France) F Serra	6	3	1
(United States) M Russell	1	2
(Spain) G García López	6	6
(Argentina) S Roitman	5	2
Q	(Spain) S Ventura	7	6
(Russia) I Andreev	2	6	6^{5}
3	(Serbia) N Djokovic	6	4	7^{7}
7	(Argentina) A Calleri	6	4	6
(Thailand) D Udomchoke	4	6	1
Q	(Colombia) A Falla	6	2	4
(Argentina) J M Del Potro	1	6	6
(Russia) E Korolev	1	0^{r}
Q	(Spain) A Martín	6	2
(Spain) A Montañés	4	3
2	(Spain) T Robredo	6	6

Second round
6	(Russia) D Tursunov	4	3
(Spain) G García López	6	6
Q	(Spain) S Ventura	2	2
3	(Serbia) N Djokovic	6	6
7	(Argentina) A Calleri	7	1
(Argentina) J M Del Potro	5	0^{r}
Q	(Spain) A Martín	7^{7}	5	2
2	(Spain) T Robredo	6^{4}	7	6

Quarterfinals
(Spain) G García López	4	6	5
3	(Serbia) N Djokovic	6	1	7
7	(Argentina) A Calleri	5	7^{7}	3
2	(Spain) T Robredo	7	6^{5}	6

Semifinals
3	(Serbia) N Djokovic	7	6
2	(Spain) T Robredo	5	1
