= 2007 Estoril Open – Women's singles =

Women's singles
- 2007 Estoril Open

Final
- Champion: (Germany) Gréta Arn
- Runner-up: (Belarus) Victoria Azarenka
- Score: 2–6, 6–1, 7–6^{(7–3)}

Events
Singles	men	women
Doubles	men	women
- Estoril Open

Zheng Jie was the defending champion, but chose not to participate this year.

Gréta Arn won the title, defeating Victoria Azarenka 2–6, 6–1, 7–6^{(7–3)} in the final.

== Seeds ==
1. (France) Marion Bartoli (quarterfinals)
2. (Italy) Francesca Schiavone (second round)
3. (Czech Republic) Lucie Šafářová (semifinals)
4. (Germany) Martina Müller (first round)
5. (Russia) Olga Puchkova (second round)
6. (Russia) Maria Kirilenko (first round)
7. ~~(France) Émilie Loit~~
8. (Greece) Eleni Daniilidou (first round)
9. (Italy) Flavia Pennetta (second round)

== Draw ==
Key

- Q = Qualifier
- WC = Wild card
- LL = Lucky loser
- Alt = Alternate
- ITF = ITF entry
- PR = Protected ranking
- SR = Special ranking
- SE = Special exempt
- JE = Junior exempt
- JR = Junior Accelerator Programme entrant
- CO = College Accelerator Programme entrant
- NG = Next Gen Accelerator Program entrant
- w/o = Walkover
- r = Retired
- d = Defaulted

=== Finals ===
Semifinals
(Spain) Nuria Llagostera Vives	6^{0}	2
Q	(Germany) Gréta Arn	7	6
3	(Czech Republic) Lucie Šafářová	4	0
(Belarus) Victoria Azarenka	6	6

Final
Q	(Germany) Gréta Arn	2	6	7
(Belarus) Victoria Azarenka	6	1	6^{3}

=== Top half ===
First round
1	(France) M Bartoli	6	6
WC	(Portugal) N Silva	2	1
(Spain) V Ruano Pascual	6	7
(France) C Pin	4	6^{4}
WC	(Portugal) AC Nogueira	1	6^{2}
(Spain) N Llagostera Vives	6	7
Q	(Croatia) N Ožegović	6	3	7
6	(Russia) M Kirilenko	3	6	5
4	(Germany) M Müller	4	0
(Denmark) C Wozniacki	6	6
Q	(Germany) G Arn	6	6
LL	(Spain) L Pous Tió	2	2
(Sweden) S Arvidsson	6	6
WC	(Portugal) F Piedade	0	0
(Russia) A Rodionova	3	6	6^{5}
5	(Russia) O Poutchkova	6	4	7

Second round
1	(France) M Bartoli	6	6
(Spain) V Ruano Pascual	3	3
(Spain) N Llagostera Vives	6	6
Q	(Croatia) N Ožegović	3	0
(Denmark) C Wozniacki	2	6	3
Q	(Germany) G Arn	6	3	6
(Sweden) S Arvidsson	6	1
5	(Russia) O Poutchkova	0	0	r

Quarterfinals
1	(France) M Bartoli	2	1	r
(Spain) N Llagostera Vives	6	3
Q	(Germany) G Arn	6	6
(Sweden) S Arvidsson	2	2

Semifinals
(Spain) N Llagostera Vives	6^{0}	2
Q	(Germany) G Arn	7	6

=== Bottom half ===
First round
8	(Greece) E Daniilidou	4	1	r
(Italy) A Brianti	6	3
(Slovakia) M Suchá	5	1
(Spain) L Domínguez Lino	7	6
Q	(Czech Republic) B Záhlavová-Strýcová	6	4	3
(Belarus) A Yakimova	2	6	6
(France) A Rezaï	6^{5}	5
3	(Czech Republic) L Šafářová	7	7
9	(Italy) F Pennetta	6	6
Q	(Spain) A Parra Santonja	3	1
(Argentina) G Dulko	6	1	6
(Germany) J Schruff	1	6	1
(France) V Razzano	6^{14}	5
(Belarus) V Azarenka	7	7
(Croatia) I Lisjak	1	5
2	(Italy) F Schiavone	6	7

Second round
(Italy) A Brianti	1	1
(Spain) L Domínguez Lino	6	6
(Belarus) A Yakimova	3	6	2
3	(Czech Republic) L Šafářová	6	2	6
9	(Italy) F Pennetta	3	6	1
(Argentina) G Dulko	6	3	6
(Belarus) V Azarenka	6	6
2	(Italy) F Schiavone	2	2

Quarterfinals
(Spain) L Domínguez Lino	5	3
3	(Czech Republic) L Šafářová	7	6
(Argentina) G Dulko	1	2
(Belarus) V Azarenka	6	6

Semifinals
3	(Czech Republic) L Šafářová	4	0
(Belarus) V Azarenka	6	6
