= 2008 Estoril Open – Women's singles =

Women's tennis tournament

Women's singles
- 2008 Estoril Open

Final
- Champion: (Russia) Maria Kirilenko
- Runner-up: (Czech Republic) Iveta Benešová
- Score: 6–4, 6–2

Events
Singles	men	women
Doubles	men	women
- Estoril Open

Gréta Arn was the defending champion, but chose not to participate that year.

Maria Kirilenko won in the final 6–4, 6–2, against Iveta Benešová.

== Seeds ==
1. (Italy) Flavia Pennetta (second round)
2. (Russia) Maria Kirilenko (champion)
3. (Italy) Karin Knapp (quarterfinals)
4. (Czech Republic) Lucie Šafářová (first round)
5. (Italy) Tathiana Garbin (quarterfinals)
6. (Czech Republic) Klára Zakopalová (semifinals)
7. (Sweden) Sofia Arvidsson (second round)
8. (France) Camille Pin (quarterfinals)

== Draw ==
Key

- Q = Qualifier
- WC = Wild card
- LL = Lucky loser
- Alt = Alternate
- ITF = ITF entry
- PR = Protected ranking
- SR = Special ranking
- SE = Special exempt
- JE = Junior exempt
- JR = Junior Accelerator Programme entrant
- CO = College Accelerator Programme entrant
- NG = Next Gen Accelerator Program entrant
- w/o = Walkover
- r = Retired
- d = Defaulted

=== Finals ===
Semifinals
(Czech Republic) Iveta Benešová	6	6
(Estonia) Maret Ani	2	1
6	(Czech Republic) Klára Zakopalová	6	3	5
2	(Russia) Maria Kirilenko	2	6	7

Final
(Czech Republic) Iveta Benešová	4	2
2	(Russia) Maria Kirilenko	6	6

=== Top half ===
First round
1	(Italy) F Pennetta	4	6	6
(Austria) Y Meusburger	6	0	2
(Czech Republic) I Benešová	6	6
WC	(Portugal) N Silva	0	2
(Bulgaria) T Pironkova	6	6
(Canada) S Dubois	0	1
(Germany) A Kerber	6^{6}	3
8	(France) C Pin	7	6
4	(Czech Republic) L Šafářová	5	4
(Belgium) K Flipkens	6
(Luxembourg) A Kremer	5	2
(Estonia) M Ani	7	6
(Germany) S Klosel	4	6	4
(Ukraine) O Savchuk	6	4	6
(United States) L Osterloh	5	4
7	(Sweden) S Arvidsson	7	6

Second round
1	(Italy) F Pennetta	2	2
(Czech Republic) I Benešová	6	6
(Bulgaria) T Pironkova	3	4
8	(France) C Pin	6	6
(Belgium) K Flipkens	0	2
(Estonia) M Ani	6	6
(Ukraine) O Savchuk	6
7	(Sweden) S Arvidsson	2	2

Quarterfinals
(Czech Republic) I Benešová	3	6	6
8	(France) C Pin	6	2	3
(Estonia) M Ani	7	4	6
(Ukraine) O Savchuk	6^{4}	6	4

Semifinals
(Czech Republic) I Benešová	6	6
(Estonia) M Ani	2	1

=== Bottom half ===
First round
6	(Czech Republic) K Zakopalová	7	3	6
(Russia) E Rodina	5	6	1
Q	(Italy) C Dentoni	6	2	6
(Paraguay) R de los Ríos	2	6	3
Q	(Colombia) M Duque Marino	6	6
(Romania) M Niculescu	4	3
WC	(Portugal) F Piedade	3	0
3	(Italy) K Knapp	6	6
5	(Italy) T Garbin	6	3	7
Q	(Ukraine) Y Beygelzimer	1	6	5
WC	(Portugal) M Larcher de Brito	6	0	4
PR	(Croatia) S Mamić	2	6	6
(Russia) A Kleybanova	2	2
(Czech Republic) P Cetkovská	6
Q	(Switzerland) S Vögele	4	7	1
2	(Russia) M Kirilenko	6	6^{2}	6

Second round
6	(Czech Republic) K Zakopalová	6	6
Q	(Italy) C Dentoni	4	1
Q	(Colombia) M Duque Marino	3	4
3	(Italy) K Knapp	6	6
5	(Italy) T Garbin	6	6
PR	(Croatia) S Mamić	2	2
(Czech Republic) P Cetkovská	3	2
2	(Russia) M Kirilenko	6	6

Quarterfinals
6	(Czech Republic) K Zakopalová	3	6	6
3	(Italy) K Knapp	6	4	4
5	(Italy) T Garbin	0	1
2	(Russia) M Kirilenko	6	6

Semifinals
6	(Czech Republic) K Zakopalová	6	3	5
2	(Russia) M Kirilenko	2	6	7
