= 2011 Australian Open – Day-by-day summaries =

The 2011 Australian Open was a tennis tournament held at Melbourne Park in Melbourne, Australia from 17 January to 30 January 2011. It was the 99th edition of the Australian Open and the first Grand Slam event of 2011. The tournament was played on hard courts and was organised by the International Tennis Federation and Tennis Australia.

The women's singles competition was won by Kim Clijsters, and the men's singles by Novak Djokovic.

== Day 1 (17 January) ==
- Seeds out:
  - Men's Singles: (United States) Sam Querrey, (Russia) Nikolay Davydenko
  - Women's Singles: (France) Aravane Rezaï, (Slovakia) Daniela Hantuchová
- Schedule of Play

Matches on main courts
Matches on Rod Laver Arena
Event	Winner	Loser	Score
Women's Singles 1st Round	(Russia) Maria Sharapova [14]	(Thailand) Tamarine Tanasugarn	6–1, 6–3
Women's Singles 1st Round	(Denmark) Caroline Wozniacki [1]	(Argentina) Gisela Dulko	6–3, 6–4
Men's Singles 1st Round	(Switzerland) Roger Federer [2]	(Slovakia) Lukáš Lacko	6–1, 6–1, 6–3
Women's Singles 1st Round	(Belgium) Yanina Wickmayer [21]	(Australia) Jarmila Groth	6–3, 2–6, 6–4
Men's Singles 1st Round	(Serbia) Novak Djokovic [3]	(Spain) Marcel Granollers	6–1, 6–3, 6–1
Matches on Hisense Arena
Event	Winner	Loser	Score
Men's Singles 1st Round	(France) Gaël Monfils [12]	(Netherlands) Thiemo de Bakker	6–7^{(5–7)}, 2–6, 7–5, 6–2, 6–1
Men's Singles 1st Round	(United States) Andy Roddick [8]	(Czech Republic) Jan Hájek	6–1, 6–2, 6–2
Women's Singles 1st Round	(United States) Venus Williams [4]	(Italy) Sara Errani	6–3, 6–2
Women's Singles 1st Round	(Belgium) Justine Henin [11]	(India) Sania Mirza [Q]	5–7, 6–3, 6–1
Matches on Margaret Court Arena
Event	Winner	Loser	Score
Women's Singles 1st Round	(Italy) Francesca Schiavone [6]	(Spain) Arantxa Parra Santonja	6–7^{(4–7)}, 6–2, 6–4
Women's Singles 1st Round	(Russia) Regina Kulikova	(Slovakia) Daniela Hantuchová [28]	7–6^{(7–3)}, 3–6, 9–7
Women's Singles 1st Round	(Australia) Jelena Dokić [WC]	(Czech Republic) Zuzana Ondrášková	6–3, 6–2
Men's Singles 1st Round	(Croatia) Ivan Ljubičić [17]	(Australia) Peter Luczak [WC]	6–3, 6–3, 7–6^{(7–2)}
Coloured background indicates a night match.

== Day 2 (18 January) ==
The second day saw both Nadal and Murray win when their opponents retired. There was also a win for wildcard Bernard Tomic whilst Baghdatis had to go to five sets before sealing victory, while Del Potro came through his first Grand Slam match since injury in straight sets. Both Tsonga and Verdasco came from two sets down to move into the next round. On the women's side both Molik and Radwańska won marathon final sets to advance into the second round. There was also a win for home hope Sam Stosur and world number two Vera Zvonerva. While the 2008 finalist Ana Ivanovic crashed out 10–8 in the final set.

In the evening matches on Rod Laver could not have been more different. The first match was a battle between two former number ones, Kim Clijsters and Dinara Safina. Clijsters did not lose a game in the forty five minutes they spent on court. The men's evening match on Laver was a repeat of the 2002 Wimbledon final between home hope Lleyton Hewitt and Argentine David Nalbandian. The pair traded breaks and shared the first four sets. Nalbandian got an early break in the deciding set. At 5–4 the Argentine served for the match, and Hewitt just as he did in the fourth set broke Nalbandian as he served for the set. At 5–6 Hewitt had two match points which Nalbandian saved, only for the Argentine to force Hewitt to save break points in the next game. At seven all the Argentine broke to love and held on to serve the match out for a 3–6 6–4 3–6 7–6(1) 9–7, win at seven minutes past one in the morning after close to a five hours battle.

- Seeds Out:
  - Men's Singles: (Latvia) Ernests Gulbis
  - Women's Singles: (Serbia) Ana Ivanovic, (Romania) Alexandra Dulgheru,
- Schedule of Play

Matches on main courts
Matches on Rod Laver Arena
Event	Winner	Loser	Score
Women's Singles 1st Round	(Russia) Vera Zvonareva [2]	(Austria) Sybille Bammer	6–2, 6–1
Men's Singles 1st Round	(Spain) Rafael Nadal [1]	(Brazil) Marcos Daniel	6–0, 5–0, retired
Women's Singles 1st Round	(Australia) Samantha Stosur [5]	(United States) Lauren Davis	6–1, 6–1
Women's Singles 1st Round	(Australia) Alicia Molik [WC]	(Italy) Roberta Vinci	1–6, 6–3, 8–6
Women's Singles 1st Round	(Belgium) Kim Clijsters [3]	(Russia) Dinara Safina	6–0, 6–0
Men's Singles 1st Round	(Argentina) David Nalbandian [27]	(Australia) Lleyton Hewitt	3–6, 6–4, 3–6, 7–6^{(7–1)}, 9–7
Matches on Hisense Arena
Event	Winner	Loser	Score
Men's Singles 1st Round	(Australia) Bernard Tomic [WC]	(France) Jérémy Chardy	6–3, 6–2, 7–6^{(7–5)}
Women's Singles 1st Round	(Serbia) Jelena Janković [7]	(Russia) Alla Kudryavtseva	6–0, 7–6^{(7–5)}
Men's Singles 1st Round	(United Kingdom) Andy Murray [5]	(Slovakia) Karol Beck	6–2, 6–1, 4–2, retired
Women's Singles 1st Round	(Russia) Ekaterina Makarova	(Serbia) Ana Ivanovic [19]	3–6, 6–4, 10–8
Matches on Margaret Court Arena
Event	Winner	Loser	Score
Men's Singles 1st Round	(United States) Michael Russell	(Australia) Matthew Ebden [WC]	6–3, 6–2, 5–7, 7–6^{(11–9)}
Women's Singles 1st Round	(Italy) Flavia Pennetta [22]	(Australia) Anastasia Rodionova	6–2, 6–1
Men's Singles 1st Round	(Sweden) Robin Söderling [4]	(Italy) Potito Starace	6–4, 6–2, 6–2
Men's Singles 1st Round	(France) Jo-Wilfried Tsonga [13]	(Germany) Philipp Petzschner	4–6, 2–6, 6–2, 6–3, 6–4
Coloured background indicates a night match.

== Day 3 (19 January) ==
- Seeds out:
  - Men's Singles: (United States) Mardy Fish, (Spain) Albert Montañés, (Argentina) Juan Mónaco
  - Women's Singles: (France) Marion Bartoli, (Estonia) Kaia Kanepi, (Belgium) Yanina Wickmayer, (Bulgaria) Tsvetana Pironkova
- Schedule of Play

Matches on main courts
Matches on Rod Laver Arena
Event	Winner	Loser	Score
Women's Singles 2nd Round	(Belgium) Justine Henin [11]	(United Kingdom) Elena Baltacha	6–1, 6–3
Men's Singles 2nd Round	(United States) Andy Roddick [8]	(Russia) Igor Kunitsyn	7–6^{(9–7)}, 6–2, 6–3
Women's Singles 2nd Round	(United States) Venus Williams [4]	(Czech Republic) Sandra Záhlavová	6–7^{(6–8)}, 6–0, 6–4
Women's Singles 2nd Round	(Czech Republic) Barbora Záhlavová-Strýcová	(Australia) Jelena Dokić [WC]	7–6^{(7–3)}, 6–1
Men's Singles 2nd Round	(Switzerland) Roger Federer [2]	(France) Gilles Simon	6–2, 6–3, 4–6, 4–6, 6–3
Matches on Hisense Arena
Event	Winner	Loser	Score
Women's Singles 2nd Round	(Denmark) Caroline Wozniacki [1]	(United States) Vania King	6–1, 6–0
Men's Singles 2nd Round	(Spain) Fernando Verdasco [9]	(Serbia) Janko Tipsarević	2–6, 4–6, 6–4, 7–6^{(7–0)}, 6–0
Women's Singles 2nd Round	(Russia) Maria Sharapova [14]	(France) Virginie Razzano	7–6^{(7–3)}, 6–3
Men's Singles 2nd Round	(Serbia) Novak Djokovic [3]	(Croatia) Ivan Dodig	7–5, 6–7^{(8–10)}, 6–0, 6–2
Matches on Margaret Court Arena
Event	Winner	Loser	Score
Men's Singles 2nd Round	(Czech Republic) Tomáš Berdych [6]	(Germany) Philipp Kohlschreiber	4–6, 6–2, 6–3, 6–4
Women's Singles 2nd Round	(Belarus) Victoria Azarenka [8]	(Czech Republic) Andrea Hlaváčková	6–4, 6–4
Women's Singles 2nd Round	(Italy) Francesca Schiavone [6]	(Canada) Rebecca Marino	6–3, 5–7, 9–7
Women's Singles 2nd Round	(China) Li Na [9]	(Russia) Evgeniya Rodina	6–3, 6–2
Men's Singles 2nd Round	(France) Gaël Monfils [12]	(Portugal) Frederico Gil	6–4, 6–3, 1–6, 6–2
Coloured background indicates a night match.

== Day 4 (20 January) ==
- Seeds out:
  - Men's Singles: (France) Michaël Llodra, (Argentina) David Nalbandian, (Brazil) Thomaz Bellucci, (Spain) Feliciano López
  - Women's Singles: (Serbia) Jelena Janković, (Russia) Maria Kirilenko, (Russia) Alisa Kleybanova, (Spain) María José Martínez Sánchez
- Schedule of Play

Matches on main courts
Matches on Rod Laver Arena
Event	Winner	Loser	Score
Women's Singles 2nd Round	(Belgium) Kim Clijsters [3]	(Spain) Carla Suárez Navarro	6–1, 6–3
Men's Singles 2nd Round	(Spain) Rafael Nadal [1]	(United States) Ryan Sweeting [Q]	6–2, 6–1, 6–1
Women's Singles 2nd Round	(Russia) Nadia Petrova [13]	(Australia) Alicia Molik [WC]	6–4, 6–1
Women's Doubles 1st Round	(Netherlands) Michaëlla Krajicek (Czech Republic) Petra Kvitová	(Italy) Francesca Schiavone [11] (Australia) Rennae Stubbs [11]	6–0, 7–5
Women's Singles 2nd Round	(Australia) Samantha Stosur [5]	(Russia) Vera Dushevina	6–3, 6–2
Men's Singles 2nd Round	(Cyprus) Marcos Baghdatis [21]	(Argentina) Juan Martín del Potro	6–1, 6–3, 4–6, 6–3
Matches on Hisense Arena
Event	Winner	Loser	Score
Women's Singles 2nd Round	(China) Peng Shuai	(Serbia) Jelena Janković [7]	7–6^{(7–3)}, 6–3
Men's Singles 2nd Round	(Australia) Bernard Tomic [WC]	(Spain) Feliciano López [31]	7–6^{(7–4)}, 7–6^{(7–3)}, 6–3
Women's Singles 2nd Round	(Russia) Vera Zvonareva [2]	(Serbia) Bojana Jovanovski	2–6, 6–3, 6–1
Men's Singles 2nd Round	(Sweden) Robin Söderling [4]	(Luxembourg) Gilles Müller [Q]	6–3, 7–6^{(7–1)}, 6–1
Matches on Margaret Court Arena
Event	Winner	Loser	Score
Women's Singles 2nd Round	(Israel) Shahar Pe'er [10]	(Romania) Sorana Cîrstea	6–3, 6–2
Women's Singles 2nd Round	(Czech Republic) Iveta Benešová	(Russia) Maria Kirilenko [18]	6–3, 6–1
Men's Singles 2nd Round	(France) Jo-Wilfried Tsonga [13]	(Italy) Andreas Seppi	6–3, 7–6^{(7–1)}, 7–6^{(7–5)}
Women's Singles 2nd Round	(Czech Republic) Lucie Šafářová [31]	(Czech Republic) Klára Zakopalová	6–3, 6–7^{(2–7)}, 7–5
Men's Singles 2nd Round	(United Kingdom) Andy Murray [5]	(Ukraine) Illya Marchenko	6–1, 6–3, 6–3
Coloured background indicates a night match.

== Day 5 (21 January) ==
- Seeds out:
  - Men's Singles: (France) Gaël Monfils, (Croatia) Ivan Ljubičić, (France) Richard Gasquet, (Serbia) Viktor Troicki
  - Women's Singles: (United States) Venus Williams, (Belgium) Justine Henin, (Slovakia) Dominika Cibulková
- Schedule of Play

Matches on main courts
Matches on Rod Laver Arena
Event	Winner	Loser	Score
Women's Singles 3rd Round	(Denmark) Caroline Wozniacki [1]	(Slovakia) Dominika Cibulková [29]	6–4, 6–3
Women's Singles 3rd Round	(Russia) Svetlana Kuznetsova [23]	(Belgium) Justine Henin [11]	6–4, 7–6^{(10–8)}
Men's Singles 3rd Round	(Switzerland) Roger Federer [2]	(Belgium) Xavier Malisse	6–3, 6–3, 6–1
Men's Singles 3rd Round	(Switzerland) Stanislas Wawrinka [19]	(France) Gaël Monfils [12]	7–6^{(7–4)}, 6–2, 6–3
Women's Singles 3rd Round	(Germany) Andrea Petkovic [30]	(United States) Venus Williams [4]	1–0, retired
Matches on Hisense Arena
Event	Winner	Loser	Score
Men's Singles 3rd Round	(Serbia) Novak Djokovic [3]	(Serbia) Viktor Troicki [29]	6–2, retired
Men's Singles 3rd Round	(United States) Andy Roddick [8]	(Netherlands) Robin Haase	2–6, 7–6^{(7–2)}, 6–2, 6–2
Women's Singles 3rd Round	(Russia) Maria Sharapova [14]	(Germany) Julia Görges	4–6, 6–4, 6–4
Men's Singles 3rd Round	(Spain) Fernando Verdasco [9]	(Japan) Kei Nishikori	6–2, 6–4, 6–3
Men's Doubles 2nd Round	(Australia) Carsten Ball [WC] (Australia) Chris Guccione [WC]	(Israel) Jonathan Erlich [14] (Israel) Andy Ram [14]	7–6^{(9–7)}, 6–7^{(3–7)}, 6–2
Matches on Margaret Court Arena
Event	Winner	Loser	Score
Women's Singles 3rd Round	(Italy) Francesca Schiavone [6]	(Romania) Monica Niculescu	6–0, 7–6^{(7–2)}
Women's Singles 3rd Round	(China) Li Na [9]	(Czech Republic) Barbora Záhlavová-Strýcová	6–2, 6–1
Men's Singles 3rd Round	(Czech Republic) Tomáš Berdych [6]	(France) Richard Gasquet [28]	6–2, 7–6^{(7–3)}, 6–2
Men's Doubles 2nd Round	(Poland) Łukasz Kubot [4] (Austria) Oliver Marach [4]	(Australia) Samuel Groth (Australia) Greg Jones	6–1, 6–3
Coloured background indicates a night match.

== Day 6 (22 January) ==
- Seeds out:
  - Men's Singles: (Russia) Mikhail Youzhny, (France) Jo-Wilfried Tsonga, (United States) John Isner, (Cyprus) Marcos Baghdatis, (Spain) Guillermo García-López
  - Women's Singles: (Australia) Samantha Stosur, (Israel) Shahar Pe'er, (Russia) Nadia Petrova, (Russia) Anastasia Pavlyuchenkova, (Czech Republic) Lucie Šafářová
- Schedule of Play

Matches on main courts
Matches on Rod Laver Arena
Event	Winner	Loser	Score
Women's Singles 3rd Round	(Russia) Vera Zvonareva [2]	(Czech Republic) Lucie Šafářová [31]	6–3, 7–6^{(11–9)}
Men's Singles 3rd Round	(United Kingdom) Andy Murray [5]	(Spain) Guillermo García-López [32]	6–1, 6–1, 6–2
Women's Singles 3rd Round	(Belgium) Kim Clijsters [3]	(France) Alizé Cornet	7–6^{(7–3)}, 6–3
Women's Singles 3rd Round	(Czech Republic) Petra Kvitová [25]	(Australia) Samantha Stosur [5]	7–6^{(7–5)}, 6–3
Men's Singles 3rd Round	(Spain) Rafael Nadal [1]	(Australia) Bernard Tomic [WC]	6–2, 7–5, 6–3
Matches on Hisense Arena
Event	Winner	Loser	Score
Men's Singles 3rd Round	(Sweden) Robin Söderling [4]	(Czech Republic) Jan Hernych [Q]	6–3, 6–1, 6–4
Women's Singles 3rd Round	(Czech Republic) Iveta Benešová	(Russia) Anastasia Pavlyuchenkova [16]	6–3, 1–6, 7–5
Women's Singles 3rd Round	(Italy) Flavia Pennetta [22]	(Israel) Shahar Pe'er [10]	3–6, 7–6^{(7–3)}, 6–4
Men's Singles 3rd Round	(Austria) Jürgen Melzer [11]	(Cyprus) Marcos Baghdatis [21]	6–7^{(5–7)}, 6–2, 6–1, 4–3, retired
Legends Doubles	(France) Henri Leconte (Australia) Patrick Rafter	(Australia) Wayne Arthurs (Australia) Pat Cash	6–4, 7–6^{(7–5)}
Matches on Margaret Court Arena
Event	Winner	Loser	Score
Women's Singles 3rd Round	(Poland) Agnieszka Radwańska [12]	(Romania) Simona Halep	6–1, 6–2
Men's Singles 3rd Round	(Ukraine) Alexandr Dolgopolov	(France) Jo-Wilfried Tsonga [13]	3–6, 6–3, 3–6, 6–1, 6–1
Men's Singles 3rd Round	(Croatia) Marin Čilić [15]	(United States) John Isner [20]	4–6, 6–2, 6–7^{(5–7)}, 7–6^{(7–2)}, 9–7
Men's Doubles 2nd Round	(Australia) Colin Ebelthite [WC] (Australia) Adam Feeney [WC]	(Germany) Dustin Brown (Netherlands) Rogier Wassen	6–3, 3–6, 6–2
Coloured background indicates a night match.

== Day 7 (23 January) ==
History was created in the match between Kuznetsova and Schiavone. The match became the longest match, in terms of time for women in a Grand Slam as it lasted for 4 hours, and 44 minutes. At 8–7 in the final set Kuznetsova had three match points, but the Italian saved all three. In the next game Schiavone broke her opponents serve but touched the net after hitting the winner, meaning the point went to Kuznetsova, when holding three break points. Kuznetsova had another three match points in the next game before a run of four games in a row where the serve was broken. Finally after breaking in the previous game and missing three match points Schiavone closed the match out to win 16–14 in the final set.

- Seeds out:
  - Men's Singles: (United States) Andy Roddick [8], (Spain) Fernando Verdasco [9], (Spain) Nicolás Almagro [14]
  - Women's Singles: (Belarus) Victoria Azarenka [8], (Russia) Maria Sharapova [14], (Russia) Svetlana Kuznetsova [23]
- Schedule of Play

Matches on main courts
Matches on Rod Laver Arena
Event	Winner	Loser	Score
Women's Singles 4th Round	(Denmark) Caroline Wozniacki [1]	(Latvia) Anastasija Sevastova	6–3, 6–4
Women's Singles 4th Round	(China) Li Na [9]	(Belarus) Victoria Azarenka [8]	6–3, 6–3
Men's Singles 4th Round	(Switzerland) Roger Federer [2]	(Spain) Tommy Robredo	6–3, 3–6, 6–3, 6–2
Women's Singles 4th Round	(Germany) Andrea Petkovic [30]	(Russia) Maria Sharapova [14]	6–2, 6–3
Men's Singles 4th Round	(Switzerland) Stanislas Wawrinka [19]	(United States) Andy Roddick [8]	6–3, 6–4, 6–4
Matches on Hisense Arena
Event	Winner	Loser	Score
Men's Doubles 3rd Round	(United States) Bob Bryan [1] (United States) Mike Bryan [1]	(Germany) Benjamin Becker (Germany) Michael Kohlmann	7–5, 6–2
Men's Singles 4th Round	(Serbia) Novak Djokovic [3]	(Spain) Nicolás Almagro [14]	6–3, 6–4, 6–0
Women's Singles 4th Round	(Italy) Francesca Schiavone [6]	(Russia) Svetlana Kuznetsova [23]	6–4, 1–6, 16–14
Matches on Margaret Court Arena
Event	Winner	Loser	Score
Legends' Doubles	(Netherlands) Jacco Eltingh (Netherlands) Paul Haarhuis	(France) Guy Forget (Sweden) Mats Wilander	7–6^{(7–5)}, 6–4
Men's Doubles 3rd Round	(Belarus) Max Mirnyi [2] (Canada) Daniel Nestor [2]	(Australia) Carsten Ball [WC] (Australia) Chris Guccione [WC]	6–4, 7–5
Men's Singles 4th Round	(Czech Republic) Tomáš Berdych [6]	(Spain) Fernando Verdasco [9]	6–4, 6–2, 6–3
Mixed Doubles 1st Round	(Czech Republic) Barbora Záhlavová-Strýcová [8] (Austria) Oliver Marach [8]	(Croatia) Mirjana Lučić [WC] (Australia) Bernard Tomic [WC]	7–6^{(7–3)}, 6–3
Legends' Doubles	(Australia) Todd Woodbridge (Australia) Mark Woodforde	(Iran) Mansour Bahrami (France) Cédric Pioline	7–5, 7–6^{(7–3)}
Coloured background indicates a night match.

== Day 8 (24 January) ==
- Seeds out:
  - Men's Singles: (Sweden) Robin Söderling, (Austria) Jürgen Melzer, (Croatia) Marin Čilić
  - Women's Singles: (Italy) Flavia Pennetta
- Schedule of Play

Matches on main courts
Matches on Rod Laver Arena
Event	Winner	Loser	Score
Men's Singles 4th Round	(Ukraine) Alexandr Dolgopolov	(Sweden) Robin Söderling [4]	1–6, 6–3, 6–1, 4–6, 6–2
Men's Singles 4th Round	(United Kingdom) Andy Murray [5]	(Austria) Jürgen Melzer [11]	6–3, 6–1, 6–1
Mixed Doubles 2nd Round	(United States) Meghann Shaughnessy (Israel) Andy Ram	(Australia) Rennae Stubbs [WC] (Australia) Chris Guccione [WC]	5–7, 6–4, [10–5]
Men's Singles 4th Round	(Spain) Rafael Nadal [1]	(Croatia) Marin Čilić [15]	6–2, 6–4, 6–3
Women's Singles 4th Round	(Belgium) Kim Clijsters [3]	(Russia) Ekaterina Makarova	7–6^{(7–3)}, 6–2
Matches on Hisense Arena
Event	Winner	Loser	Score
Women's Singles 4th Round	(Czech Republic) Petra Kvitová [25]	(Italy) Flavia Pennetta [22]	3–6, 6–3, 6–3
Women's Singles 4th Round	(Russia) Vera Zvonareva [2]	(Czech Republic) Iveta Benešová	6–4, 6–1
Men's Singles 4th Round	(Spain) David Ferrer [7]	(Canada) Milos Raonic [Q]	4–6, 6–2, 6–3, 6–4
Matches on Margaret Court Arena
Event	Winner	Loser	Score
Men's Doubles 3rd Round	(Poland) Mariusz Fyrstenberg [5] (Poland) Marcin Matkowski [5]	(Australia) Colin Ebelthite [WC] (Australia) Adam Feeney [WC]	6–1, 4–6, 6–4
Women's Doubles 3rd Round	(Zimbabwe) Cara Black [5] (Australia) Anastasia Rodionova [5]	(United States) Raquel Kops-Jones (United States) Abigail Spears	6–4, 6–2
Women's Singles 4th Round	(Poland) Agnieszka Radwańska [12]	(China) Peng Shuai	7–5, 3–6, 7–5
Men's Doubles 3rd Round	(France) Michaël Llodra [8] (Serbia) Nenad Zimonjić [8]	(India) Rohan Bopanna [10] (Pakistan) Aisam-ul-Haq Qureshi [10]	3–6, 7–6^{(8–6)}, 7–6^{(7–3)}
Legends' Doubles	(France) Henri Leconte (Australia) Patrick Rafter	(South Africa) Wayne Ferreira (Russia) Yevgeny Kafelnikov	7–5, 6–3
Coloured background indicates a night match.

== Day 9 (25 January) ==
- Seeds out:
  - Men's Singles: (Czech Republic) Tomáš Berdych, (Switzerland) Stanislas Wawrinka
  - Women's Singles: (Italy) Francesca Schiavone, (Germany) Andrea Petkovic
- Schedule of Play

Matches on main courts
Matches on Rod Laver Arena
Event	Winner	Loser	Score
Women's Singles Quarterfinals	(China) Li Na [9]	(Germany) Andrea Petkovic [30]	6–2, 6–4
Men's Singles Quarterfinals	(Switzerland) Roger Federer [2]	(Switzerland) Stanislas Wawrinka [19]	6–1, 6–3, 6–3
Women's Singles Quarterfinals	(Denmark) Caroline Wozniacki [1]	(Italy) Francesca Schiavone [6]	3–6, 6–3, 6–3
Men's Singles Quarterfinals	(Serbia) Novak Djokovic [3]	(Czech Republic) Tomáš Berdych [6]	6–1, 7–6^{(7–5)}, 6–1
Women's Doubles Quarterfinals	(United States) Liezel Huber [3] (Russia) Nadia Petrova [3]	(Zimbabwe) Cara Black [5] (Australia) Anastasia Rodionova [5]	6–1, 6–4
Matches on Margaret Court Arena
Event	Winner	Loser	Score
Legends' Doubles	(Australia) Wayne Arthurs (Australia) Pat Cash	(South Africa) Wayne Ferreira (Russia) Yevgeny Kafelnikov	6–4, 6–3
Men's Doubles Quarterfinals	(United States) Bob Bryan [1] (United States) Mike Bryan [1]	(Austria) Jürgen Melzer [6] (Germany) Philipp Petzschner [6]	6–3, 7–6^{(9–7)}
Women's Doubles Quarterfinals	(Argentina) Gisela Dulko [1] (Italy) Flavia Pennetta [1]	(South Africa) Natalie Grandin (Czech Republic) Vladimíra Uhlířová	6–0, 6–3
Legends' Doubles	(France) Henri Leconte (Australia) Patrick Rafter	(Austria) Thomas Muster (Sweden) Mikael Pernfors	6–3, 6–3
Legends' Doubles	(Netherlands) Jacco Eltingh (Netherlands) Paul Haarhuis	(Iran) Mansour Bahrami (France) Cédric Pioline	6–3, 7–6^{(10–8)}
Coloured background indicates a night match.

== Day 10 (26 January) ==
Australia Day witnessed the last four quarterfinals in the men's and women's singles and the start of the wheelchair tennis competitions. In the first of the men's quarterfinals Murray over came Dolgopolov after a four set battle.

- Seeds out:
  - Men's Singles: (Spain) Rafael Nadal
  - Women's Singles: (Poland) Agnieszka Radwańska, (Czech Republic) Petra Kvitová
- Schedule of Play

Matches on main courts
Matches on Rod Laver Arena
Event	Winner	Loser	Score
Women's Singles Quarterfinals	(Russia) Vera Zvonareva [2]	(Czech Republic) Petra Kvitová [25]	6–2, 6–4
Women's Singles Quarterfinals	(Belgium) Kim Clijsters [3]	(Poland) Agnieszka Radwańska [12]	6–3, 7–6(4)
Men's Singles Quarterfinals	(United Kingdom) Andy Murray [5]	(Ukraine) Alexandr Dolgopolov	7–5, 6–3, 6–7^{(3–7)}, 6–3
Men's Singles Quarterfinals	(Spain) David Ferrer [7]	(Spain) Rafael Nadal [1]	6–4, 6–2, 6–3
Mixed Doubles Quarterfinals	(United States) Bethanie Mattek-Sands (Romania) Horia Tecău	(Australia) Sally Peers [WC] (Australia) Carsten Ball [WC]	7–5, 6–4
Matches on Margaret Court Arena
Event	Winner	Loser	Score
Legends' Doubles	(France) Guy Forget (Sweden) Mats Wilander	(Iran) Mansour Bahrami (France) Cédric Pioline	6–4, 6–7^{(3–7)}, [10–8]
Men's Doubles Quarterfinals	(India) Mahesh Bhupathi [3] (India) Leander Paes [3]	(France) Michaël Llodra [8] (Serbia) Nenad Zimonjić [8]	6–4, 6–4
Men's Doubles Quarterfinals	(Belarus) Max Mirnyi [2] (Canada) Daniel Nestor [2]	(Poland) Mariusz Fyrstenberg [5] (Poland) Marcin Matkowski [5]	7–6^{(7–3)}, 6–3
Women's Doubles Semifinals	(Argentina) Gisela Dulko [1] (Italy) Flavia Pennetta [1]	(United States) Liezel Huber [3] (Russia) Nadia Petrova [3]	6–4, 7–5
Mixed Doubles Second Round	(Chinese Taipei) Chan Yung-jan (Australia) Paul Hanley	(Zimbabwe) Cara Black [4] (India) Leander Paes [4]	7–6^{(13–11)}, 7–6^{(7–5)}
Coloured background indicates a night match.

== Day 11 (27 January) ==
- Seeds out:
  - Men's Singles: (Switzerland) Roger Federer
  - Women's Singles: (Denmark) Caroline Wozniacki, (Russia) Vera Zvonareva
- Schedule of Play

Matches on main courts
Matches on Rod Laver Arena
Event	Winner	Loser	Score
Men's Doubles Semifinals	(United States) Bob Bryan [1] (United States) Mike Bryan [1]	(United States) Eric Butorac (Curaçao) Jean-Julien Rojer	6–3, 6–2
Women's Singles Semifinals	(China) Li Na [9]	(Denmark) Caroline Wozniacki [1]	3–6, 7–5, 6–3
Women's Singles Semifinals	(Belgium) Kim Clijsters [3]	(Russia) Vera Zvonareva [2]	6–3, 6–3
Men's Singles Semifinals	(Serbia) Novak Djokovic [3]	(Switzerland) Roger Federer [2]	7–6^{(7–3)}, 7–5, 6–4
Exhibition Doubles – 2nd Round	(Netherlands) Jacco Eltingh (Netherlands) Paul Haarhuis	(France) Henri Leconte (Australia) Patrick Rafter	6–4, 6–3
Matches on Margaret Court Arena
Event	Winner	Loser	Score
Wheelchair Women's Singles Semifinals	(Australia) Daniela di Toro [2]	(Netherlands) Marjolein Buis	6–3, 6–2
Men's Doubles Semifinals	(India) Mahesh Bhupathi [3] (India) Leander Paes [3]	(Belarus) Max Mirnyi [2] (Canada) Daniel Nestor [2]	7–6^{(7–5)}, 4–6, 6–3
Boys' Singles Quarterfinals	(Australia) Luke Saville	(France) Lucas Pouille	7–5, 7–5
Mixed Doubles Quarterfinals	(Slovenia) Katarina Srebotnik [2] (Canada) Daniel Nestor [2]	(Australia) Anastasia Rodionova (India) Mahesh Bhupathi	Walkover
Coloured background indicates a night match.

== Day 12 (28 January) ==
- Seeds out:
  - Men's Singles: (Spain) David Ferrer
- Schedule of Play

Matches on main courts
Matches on Rod Laver Arena
Event	Winner	Loser	Score
Women's Doubles Final	(Argentina) Gisela Dulko [1] (Italy) Flavia Pennetta [1]	(Belarus) Victoria Azarenka [12] (Russia) Maria Kirilenko [12]	2–6, 7–5, 6–1
Mixed Doubles Semifinals	(Chinese Taipei) Chan Yung-jan (Australia) Paul Hanley	(United States) Bethanie Mattek-Sands (Romania) Horia Tecău	2–6, 6–3, [11–9]
Men's Singles Semifinals	(United Kingdom) Andy Murray [5]	(Spain) David Ferrer [7]	4–6, 7–6^{(7–2)}, 6–1, 7–6^{(7–2)}
Matches on Margaret Court Arena
Event	Winner	Loser	Score
Boys' Singles Semifinals	(Australia) Luke Saville	(Spain) Roberto Carballes	6–2, 6–1
Legends' Doubles	(Australia) Todd Woodbridge (Australia) Mark Woodforde	(France) Henri Leconte (Australia) Patrick Rafter	6–4, 6–4
Mixed Doubles Semifinals	(Slovenia) Katarina Srebotnik [2] (Canada) Daniel Nestor [2]	(Russia) Maria Kirilenko [3] (Serbia) Nenad Zimonjić [3]	6–4, 7–5
Coloured background indicates a night match.

== Day 13 (29 January) ==
- Seeds out:
  - Women's Singles: (China) Li Na
- Schedule of Play

Matches on main courts
Matches on Rod Laver Arena
Event	Winner	Loser	Score
Boys' Singles Final	(Czech Republic) Jiří Veselý [1]	(Australia) Luke Saville	6–0, 6–3
Girls' Singles Final	(Belgium) An-Sophie Mestach [2]	(Puerto Rico) Monica Puig [5]	6–4, 6–2
Women's Singles Final	(Belgium) Kim Clijsters [3]	(China) Li Na [9]	3–6, 6–3, 6–3
Men's Doubles Final	(United States) Bob Bryan [1] (United States) Mike Bryan [1]	(India) Mahesh Bhupathi [3] (India) Leander Paes [3]	6–3, 6–4
Matches on Margaret Court Arena
Event	Winner	Loser	Score
Wheelchair Quad Singles Final	(United States) David Wagner [1]	(United Kingdom) Peter Norfolk [2]	6–2, 6–3
Wheelchair Men's Singles Final	(Japan) Shingo Kunieda [1]	(France) Stéphane Houdet [2]	6–0, 6–3
Wheelchair Women's Singles Final	(Netherlands) Esther Vergeer [1]	(Australia) Daniela Di Toro [2]	6–0, 6–0
Coloured background indicates a night match.

== Day 14 (30 January) ==
- Seeds out:
  - Men's Singles: (United Kingdom) Andy Murray
- Schedule of Play

Matches on main courts
Matches on Rod Laver Arena
Event	Winner	Loser	Score
Mixed Doubles Final	(Slovenia) Katarina Srebotnik [2] (Canada) Daniel Nestor [2]	(Chinese Taipei) Chan Yung-jan (Australia) Paul Hanley	6–3, 3–6, [10–7]
Men's Singles Final	(Serbia) Novak Djokovic [3]	(United Kingdom) Andy Murray [5]	6–4, 6–2, 6–3
Coloured background indicates a night match.
