= 2006 Estoril Open – Women's doubles =

Women's doubles
- 2006 Estoril Open

Final
- Champions: (China) Li Ting (China) Sun Tiantian
- Runners-up: (Argentina) Gisela Dulko (Spain) María Sánchez Lorenzo
- Score: 6–2, 6–2

Details
- Draw: 16
- Seeds: 4

Events
Singles	men	women
Doubles	men	women
- Estoril Open

Li Ting and Sun Tiantian were the defending champions and successfully defended their title, by defeating Gisela Dulko and María Sánchez Lorenzo 6–2, 6–2 in the final.

It was the 9th title for Li and the 8th title for Sun in their respective doubles careers. It was also the 2nd title for the pair during the season, after their win in Pattaya City.

== Seeds ==
1. (China) Yan Zi / (China) Zheng Jie (quarterfinals)
2. (China) Li Ting / (China) Sun Tiantian (champions)
3. (Spain) Lourdes Domínguez Lino / (France) Émilie Loit (first round)
4. (Greece) Eleni Daniilidou / (Germany) Jasmin Wöhr (quarterfinals)

== Draw ==
Key

- Q = Qualifier
- WC = Wild card
- LL = Lucky loser
- Alt = Alternate
- ITF = ITF entry
- PR = Protected ranking
- SR = Special ranking
- SE = Special exempt
- JE = Junior exempt
- JR = Junior Accelerator Programme entrant
- CO = College Accelerator Programme entrant
- NG = Next Gen Accelerator Program entrant
- w/o = Walkover
- r = Retired
- d = Defaulted

First round
1	(China) Z Yan (China) J Zheng	6	6
WC	(Portugal) A C Nogueira (Portugal) N Silva	3	3
(Russia) V Dushevina (France) V Razzano	6	4	2
(Argentina) G Dulko (Spain) M Sánchez Lorenzo	4	6	6
3	(Spain) L Domínguez Lino (France) E Loit	2	6	4
(Germany) S Klösel (Russia) A Rodionova	6	4	6
(Spain) C Martínez Granados (Venezuela) M Vento-Kabchi	7^{7}	6
(United States) B Mattek (Australia) B Stewart	6^{4}	3
Q	(United States) N Uberoi (India) S Uberoi	4	6	7
(South Africa) N Grandin (Austria) B Schwartz	6	2	5
(Argentina) MJ Argeri (Brazil) L Sobral	2	1
4	(Greece) E Daniilidou (Germany) J Wöhr	6	6
(Ukraine) Y Beygelzimer (Czech Republic) E Birnerová	3	3
(France) S Foretz (Italy) An Serra Zanetti	6	6
(Spain) A Parra Santonja (Argentina) ME Salerni	3	2
2	(China) T Li (China) T Sun	6	6

Quarterfinals
1	(China) Z Yan (China) J Zheng	2	1
(Argentina) G Dulko (Spain) M Sánchez Lorenzo	6	6
(Germany) S Klösel (Russia) A Rodionova	6	3	6
(Spain) C Martínez Granados (Venezuela) M Vento-Kabchi	2	6	4
Q	(United States) N Uberoi (India) S Uberoi	4	6	6
4	(Greece) E Daniilidou (Germany) J Wöhr	6	4	2
(France) S Foretz (Italy) An Serra Zanetti	7	2	5
2	(China) T Li (China) T Sun	5	6	7

Semifinals
(Argentina) G Dulko (Spain) M Sánchez Lorenzo	w/o
(Germany) S Klösel (Russia) A Rodionova
Q	(United States) N Uberoi (India) S Uberoi	6	2	1
2	(China) T Li (China) T Sun	4	6	6

Final
(Argentina) G Dulko (Spain) M Sánchez Lorenzo	2	2
2	(China) T Li (China) T Sun	6	6
