= 2008 Estoril Open – Men's singles =

Men's singles
- 2008 Estoril Open

Final
- Champion: (Switzerland) Roger Federer
- Runner-up: (Russia) Nikolay Davydenko
- Score: 7–6^{(7–5)}, 1–2 retired

Details
- Draw: 32 (4Q / 3WC)
- Seeds: 8

Events
Singles	men	women
Doubles	men	women
← 2007 ·	Estoril Open	· 2009 →

Novak Djokovic was the defending champion, but chose not to participate that year.

First-seeded Roger Federer won in the final 7–6^{(7–5)}, 1–2, after Nikolay Davydenko retired due to a left leg injury.

== Seeds ==
1. (Switzerland) Roger Federer (champion)
2. (Russia) Nikolay Davydenko (final, retired due to a left leg injury)
3. (Croatia) Ivo Karlović (first round, retired due to a right knee injury)
4. (Finland) Jarkko Nieminen (first round)
5. (France) Gilles Simon (second round, retired due to a back injury)
6. (France) Nicolas Mahut (first round)
7. (France) Marc Gicquel (quarterfinals)
8. (Germany) Michael Berrer (second round)

== Draw ==
=== Key ===
- Q = Qualifier
- WC = Wild card
- LL = Lucky loser
- Alt = Alternate
- SE = Special exempt
- PR = Protected ranking
- ITF = ITF entry
- JE = Junior exempt
- w/o = Walkover
- r = Retired
- d = Defaulted
- SR = Special ranking

=== Finals ===
Semifinals
1	(Switzerland) Roger Federer	2	7	6
(Germany) Denis Gremelmayr	6	5	1
(France) Florent Serra	2	2
2	(Russia) Nikolay Davydenko	6	6

Final
1	(Switzerland) Roger Federer	7^{7}	1
2	(Russia) Nikolay Davydenko	6^{5}	2^{r}

=== Top half ===
First round
1	(Switzerland) R Federer	4	6	6
(Belgium) O Rochus	6	3	2
(France) O Patience	1	6^{2}
(Romania) V Hănescu	6	7^{7}
Q	(Austria) O Marach	1	3
Q	(Portugal) J Sousa	6	6
WC	(Portugal) F Gil	6	6
6	(France) N Mahut	0	3
4	(Finland) J Nieminen	6	1	2
(Germany) D Gremelmayr	3	6	6
(Germany) F Mayer	5	5
(Russia) T Gabashvili	7	7
(Czech Republic) J Vaněk	4	6	6
(Germany) P Petzschner	6	3	4
WC	(Portugal) G Elias	4	5
8	(Germany) M Berrer	6	7

Second round
1	(Switzerland) R Federer	6	6
(Romania) V Hănescu	3	2
Q	(Portugal) J Sousa	6^{5}	2
WC	(Portugal) F Gil	7^{7}	6
(Germany) D Gremelmayr	7^{8}	6
(Russia) T Gabashvili	6^{6}	1
(Czech Republic) J Vaněk	6	3	7
8	(Germany) M Berrer	3	6	5

Quarterfinals
1	(Switzerland) R Federer	6	6
WC	(Portugal) F Gil	4	1
(Germany) D Gremelmayr	6	3	6
(Czech Republic) J Vaněk	2	6	2

Semifinals
1	(Switzerland) R Federer	2	7	6
(Germany) D Gremelmayr	6	5	1

=== Bottom half ===
First round
5	(France) G Simon	7	7
(Croatia) R Karanušić	5	5
(Italy) F Cipolla	6	5	6
(France) É Roger-Vasselin	4	7	4
Q	(Italy) G Naso	1	2
(France) F Serra	6	6
WC	(Portugal) R Machado	6	1
3	(Croatia) I Karlović	4	0^{r}
7	(France) M Gicquel	6	6
(Serbia) B Pašanski	4	3
(France) T Ascione	6	6
Q	(Russia) A Kudryavtsev	1	4
(Czech Republic) I Minář	7	6
(Argentina) M Vassallo Argüello	5	1
(Austria) J Melzer	3	1
2	(Russia) N Davydenko	6	6

Second round
5	(France) G Simon	2	3^{r}
(Italy) F Cipolla	6	5
(France) F Serra	7^{7}	6
WC	(Portugal) R Machado	6^{5}	1
7	(France) M Gicquel	7^{7}	6
(France) T Ascione	6^{2}	3
(Czech Republic) I Minář	6	2	4
2	(Russia) N Davydenko	2	6	6

Quarterfinals
(Italy) F Cipolla	1	1
(France) F Serra	6	6
7	(France) M Gicquel	4	7	3
2	(Russia) N Davydenko	6	5	6

Semifinals
(France) F Serra	2	2
2	(Russia) N Davydenko	6	6
