= 2008 Estoril Open – Women's doubles =

Women's doubles
- 2008 Estoril Open

Final
- Champions: (Russia) Maria Kirilenko; (Italy) Flavia Pennetta
- Runners-up: (Bosnia and Herzegovina) Mervana Jugić-Salkić; (Turkey) İpek Şenoğlu
- Score: 6–4, 6–4

Events
Singles	men	women
Doubles	men	women
- Estoril Open

Andreea Ehritt-Vanc and Anastasia Rodionova were the defending champions, but chose not to participate that year.

Maria Kirilenko and Flavia Pennetta won in the final 6–4, 6–4, against Mervana Jugić-Salkić and İpek Şenoğlu.

== Seeds ==
1. (Russia) Maria Kirilenko / (Italy) Flavia Pennetta (champions)
2. (Czech Republic) Gabriela Navrátilová / (Romania) Monica Niculescu (first round)
3. (Czech Republic) Iveta Benešová / (Czech Republic) Petra Cetkovská (first round)
4. (Czech Republic) Eva Hrdinová / (Poland) Klaudia Jans (second round)

== Draw ==
Key

- Q = Qualifier
- WC = Wild card
- LL = Lucky loser
- Alt = Alternate
- ITF = ITF entry
- PR = Protected ranking
- SR = Special ranking
- SE = Special exempt
- JE = Junior exempt
- JR = Junior Accelerator Programme entrant
- CO = College Accelerator Programme entrant
- NG = Next Gen Accelerator Program entrant
- w/o = Walkover
- r = Retired
- d = Defaulted

=== Draw ===
First round

Quarterfinals

Semifinals

Final

1
- (Russia) M Kirilenko
- (Italy) F Pennetta
6
6

- (South Africa) N Grandin
- (France) C Pin
1
3

1
- (Russia) M Kirilenko
- (Italy) F Pennetta
6
6

- (Belarus) D Kustova
- (Spain) M Marrero
6
6

- (Belarus) D Kustova
- (Spain) M Marrero
2
3

- (Canada) S Dubois
- (Russia) E Rodina
2
2

1
- (Russia) M Kirilenko (Italy) F Pennetta
6
6

4
- (Czech Republic) E Hrdinová
- (Poland) K Jans
6
4
[10]

- (Russia) A Rodionova
- (Ukraine) O Savchuk
2
3

- (South Africa) K Anderson
- (Japan) R Fujiwara
2
6
[7]

4
- (Czech Republic) E Hrdinová
- (Poland) K Jans
2
6
[4]

- (Russia) A Rodionova
- (Ukraine) O Savchuk
7
5
[10]

- (Russia) A Rodionova
- (Ukraine) O Savchuk
6
4
[10]

- (Latvia) L Dekmeijere
- (Poland) A Rosolska
6^{5}
7
[5]

1
(Russia) M Kirilenko
(Italy) F Pennetta
6
6

- (Russia) A Kleybanova
- (Germany) S Klösel
6
4
[10]

- (Bosnia and Herzegovina) M Jugić-Salkić
- (Turkey) İ Şenoğlu
4
4

WC
- (Portugal) M Larcher de Brito
- (Portugal) N Silva
4
6
[8]

- (Russia) A Kleybanova
- (Germany) S Klösel
3
3

- (Bosnia and Herzegovina) M Jugić-Salkić
- (Turkey) İ Şenoğlu
3
6
[10]

- (Bosnia and Herzegovina) M Jugić-Salkić
- (Turkey) İ Şenoğlu
6
6

3
- (Czech Republic) I Benešová
- (Czech Republic) P Cetkovská
6
4
[8]

- (Bosnia and Herzegovina) M Jugić-Salkić
- (Turkey) İ Şenoğlu
6
6

- (Sweden) S Arvidsson
- (United States) L Osterloh
6
6

- (Sweden) S Arvidsson
- (United States) L Osterloh
2
2

- (Czech Republic) A Hlaváčková
- (Czech Republic) L Šafářová
3
4

- (Sweden) S Arvidsson
- (United States) L Osterloh
6
6

- (Estonia) M Ani
- (Slovenia) A Klepač
6
6

- (Estonia) M Ani
- (Slovenia) A Klepač
2
1

2
- (Czech Republic) G Navrátilová
- (Romania) M Niculescu
2
3
