= 2006 Estoril Open – Women's singles =

Women's singles
- 2006 Estoril Open

Final
- Champion: (China) Zheng Jie
- Runner-up: (China) Li Na
- Score: 6–7^{(5–7)}, 7–5, retired

Details
- Draw: 32
- Seeds: 8

Events
Singles	men	women
Doubles	men	women
- Estoril Open

Lucie Šafářová was the defending champion, but did not compete this year.

Sixth-seeded Zheng Jie won the title with the score tied at 1 set all, after her opponent Li Na was forced to retire due to a heat illness. It was the first all Chinese WTA Tour final and for Zheng the second title in her career.

== Seeds ==
1. (Italy) Flavia Pennetta (semifinals)
2. (Argentina) Gisela Dulko (quarterfinals)
3. (Spain) Lourdes Domínguez Lino (quarterfinals)
4. (Italy) ~~Roberta Vinci~~ (withdrew due to a right leg injury)
5. (Russia) Vera Dushevina (first round)
6. (China) Zheng Jie (champion)
7. (France) Émilie Loit (semifinals)
8. (China) Li Na (final, retired due to a heat illness)
9. (France) Virginie Razzano (first round)

== Draw ==
Key

- Q = Qualifier
- WC = Wild card
- LL = Lucky loser
- Alt = Alternate
- ITF = ITF entry
- PR = Protected ranking
- SR = Special ranking
- SE = Special exempt
- JE = Junior exempt
- JR = Junior Accelerator Programme entrant
- CO = College Accelerator Programme entrant
- NG = Next Gen Accelerator Program entrant
- w/o = Walkover
- r = Retired
- d = Defaulted

=== Finals ===
Semifinals
1	(Italy) Flavia Pennetta	2	3
6	(China) Zheng Jie	6	6
7	(France) Émilie Loit	5	2
8	(China) Li Na	7	6

Final
6	(China) Zheng Jie	6^{5}	7	0
8	(China) Li Na	7^{7}	5	0^{r}

=== Top half ===
First round
1	(Italy) F Pennetta	6	2	7^{7}
(Russia) E Vesnina	2	6	6^{2}
Q	(India) S Uberoi	6	4	3
(Estonia) M Ani	4	6	6
(United States) B Mattek	5	4
(Greece) E Daniilidou	7	6
(Argentina) M Díaz Oliva	3	6	6
9	(France) V Razzano	6	4	4
5	(Russia) V Dushevina	4	4
(Italy) An Serra Zanetti	6	6
(Czech Republic) Z Ondrášková	6	6
(Italy) M Elena Camerin	3	3
(Spain) L Pous Tió	6	6
(Venezuela) M Vento-Kabchi	0	0
LL	(Belarus) V Azarenka	5	4
6	(China) J Zheng	7	6

Second round
1	(Italy) F Pennetta	6	2	6
(Estonia) M Ani	4	6	2
(Greece) E Daniilidou	7	7
(Argentina) M Díaz Oliva	5	5
(Italy) An Serra Zanetti	2	1
(Czech Republic) Z Ondrášková	6	6
(Spain) L Pous Tió	2	6	3
6	(China) J Zheng	6	2	6

Quarterfinals
1	(Italy) F Pennetta	6	5	6
(Greece) E Daniilidou	2	7	3
(Czech Republic) Z Ondrášková	1	3
6	(China) J Zheng	6	6

Semifinals
1	(Italy) F Pennetta	2	3
6	(China) J Zheng	6	6

=== Bottom half ===
First round
7	(France) É Loit	6	6
WC	(Portugal) F Piedade	1	2
(Czech Republic) E Birnerová	3	3
Q	(Argentina) N Gussoni	6	6
(France) S Foretz	4	1
(Estonia) K Kanepi	6	6
WC	(Portugal) M de Lattre	1	2
3	(Spain) L Domínguez Lino	6	6
8	(China) N Li	6	6
Q	(Germany) K Barrois	4	3
Q	(Czech Republic) K Böhmová	6	4	7
(Spain) A Parra Santonja	2	6	5
(Spain) A Sánchez Lorenzo	5	3
WC	(Argentina) P Suárez	7	6
(China) Z Yan	4	4
2	(Argentina) G Dulko	6	6

Second round
7	(France) É Loit	6	6
Q	(Argentina) N Gussoni	2	2
(Estonia) K Kanepi	1	4
3	(Spain) L Domínguez Lino	6	6
8	(China) N Li	6	6
Q	(Czech Republic) K Böhmová	1	0
WC	(Argentina) P Suárez	2	1
2	(Argentina) G Dulko	6	6

Quarterfinals
7	(France) É Loit	6	4	6
3	(Spain) L Domínguez Lino	4	6	2
8	(China) N Li	6	6
2	(Argentina) G Dulko	3	1

Semifinals
7	(France) É Loit	5	2
8	(China) N Li	7	6
