= 2006 Estoril Open – Men's doubles =

Men's doubles
- 2006 Estoril Open

Final
- Champions: (Czech Republic) Lukáš Dlouhý (Czech Republic) Pavel Vízner
- Runners-up: (Argentina) Lucas Arnold (Czech Republic) Leoš Friedl
- Score: 6–3, 6–1

Details
- Draw: 16
- Seeds: 4

Events
Singles	men	women
Doubles	men	women
- Estoril Open

In the finale of the 2006 Estoril Open's Men's Doubles, František Čermák and Leoš Friedl were defending champions from the previous year. Čermák did not participate. Lukáš Dlouhý and Pavel Vízner won in the final 6–3, 6–1, against Lucas Arnold and Leoš Friedl.

== Seeds ==
1. (Poland) Mariusz Fyrstenberg / (Poland) Marcin Matkowski (quarterfinals)
2. (Czech Republic) Lukáš Dlouhý / (Czech Republic) Pavel Vízner (champions)
3. (Argentina) Lucas Arnold / (Czech Republic) Leoš Friedl (final)
4. (Czech Republic) Tomáš Cibulec / (Czech Republic) Jaroslav Levinský (semifinals)

== Draw ==
Key

- Q = Qualifier
- WC = Wild card
- LL = Lucky loser
- Alt = Alternate
- ITF = ITF entry
- PR = Protected ranking
- SR = Special ranking
- SE = Special exempt
- JE = Junior exempt
- JR = Junior Accelerator Programme entrant
- CO = College Accelerator Programme entrant
- NG = Next Gen Accelerator Program entrant
- w/o = Walkover
- r = Retired
- d = Defaulted

=== Draw ===
First round
1	(Poland) M Fyrstenberg (Poland) M Matkowski	6	6
(Argentina) C Berlocq (Chinese Taipei) Y-t Wang	4	3
(Russia) M Safin (Russia) D Tursunov	6	4	[10]
(Czech Republic) D Škoch (Czech Republic) T Zíb	3	6	[8]
3	(Argentina) L Arnold (Czech Republic) L Friedl	6	6
(Australia) A Fisher (Australia) J Kerr	2	2
(Argentina) M García (Netherlands) R Sluiter	4	3
(Argentina) G Marcaccio (Brazil) F Saretta	6	6
WC	(Portugal) N Marques (Portugal) L Tavares	5	6	[10]
(United States) J Gimelstob (Spain) A Portas	7	2	[3]
(Luxembourg) G Müller (Belgium) C Rochus	6	5	[8]
4	(Czech Republic) T Cibulec (Czech Republic) J Levinský	3	7	[10]
(Italy) L Azzaro (Costa Rica) JA Marín	6	6
(Romania) R Sabău (United States) V Spadea	4	1
WC	(Portugal) F Gil (Portugal) G Nicau	3	3
2	(Czech Republic) L Dlouhý (Czech Republic) P Vízner	6	6

Quarterfinals
1	(Poland) M Fyrstenberg (Poland) M Matkowski	4	7^{7}	[5]
(Russia) M Safin (Russia) D Tursunov	6	6^{3}	[10]
3	(Argentina) L Arnold (Czech Republic) L Friedl	6	6
(Argentina) G Marcaccio (Brazil) F Saretta	2	3
WC	(Portugal) N Marques (Portugal) L Tavares	3	6	[4]
4	(Czech Republic) T Cibulec (Czech Republic) J Levinský	6	4	[10]
(Italy) L Azzaro (Costa Rica) JA Marín	3	3
2	(Czech Republic) L Dlouhý (Czech Republic) P Vízner	6	6

Semifinals
(Russia) M Safin (Russia) D Tursunov
3	(Argentina) L Arnold (Czech Republic) L Friedl	w/o
4	(Czech Republic) T Cibulec (Czech Republic) J Levinský	3	2
2	(Czech Republic) L Dlouhý (Czech Republic) P Vízner	6	6

Final
3	(Argentina) L Arnold (Czech Republic) L Friedl	3	1
2	(Czech Republic) L Dlouhý (Czech Republic) P Vízner	6	6
