= 2007 Estoril Open – Men's doubles =

Men's doubles
- 2007 Estoril Open

Final
- Champions: (Brazil) Marcelo Melo (Brazil) André Sá
- Runners-up: (Argentina) Martín García (Argentina) Sebastián Prieto
- Score: 3–6, 6–2, [10–6]

Events
Singles	men	women
Doubles	men	women
- Estoril Open

Lukáš Dlouhý and Pavel Vízner were the defending champions, but did not participate this year.

Marcelo Melo and André Sá won in the final 3–6, 6–2, [10–6], against Martín García and Sebastián Prieto.

== Seeds ==
1. (Poland) Mariusz Fyrstenberg / (Poland) Marcin Matkowski (semifinals)
2. (Sweden) Simon Aspelin / (Czech Republic) František Čermák (first round)
3. (Czech Republic) Leoš Friedl / (Czech Republic) David Škoch (first round)
4. (United States) Eric Butorac / (United Kingdom) Jamie Murray (first round)

== Draw ==
Key

- Q = Qualifier
- WC = Wild card
- LL = Lucky loser
- Alt = Alternate
- ITF = ITF entry
- PR = Protected ranking
- SR = Special ranking
- SE = Special exempt
- JE = Junior exempt
- JR = Junior Accelerator Programme entrant
- CO = College Accelerator Programme entrant
- NG = Next Gen Accelerator Program entrant
- w/o = Walkover
- r = Retired
- d = Defaulted

=== Draw ===
First round
1	(Poland) M Fyrstenberg (Poland) M Matkowski	7	5	[10]
Alt	(Russia) I Kunitsyn (Argentina) S Roitman	5	7	[5]
(United States) M Russell (United States) V Spadea	4	1
(Czech Republic) T Cibulec (Australia) J Kerr	6	6
3	(Czech Republic) L Friedl (Czech Republic) D Škoch	6	2	[4]
(Brazil) M Melo (Brazil) A Sá	2	6	[10]
WC	(Portugal) G Elias (Portugal) P Sousa	w/o
(Peru) L Horna (Argentina) J Mónaco
(United States) S Lipsky (United States) T Phillips	6	6^{8}	[10]
WC	(Belarus) M Mirnyi (Belarus) V Voltchkov	4	7^{10}	[7]
(Argentina) M García (Argentina) S Prieto	4	6	[10]
4	(United States) E Butorac (United Kingdom) J Murray	6	4	[6]
(South Africa) J Coetzee (Netherlands) R Wassen	6	6
(United Kingdom) J Auckland (Australia) S Huss	3	0
(Spain) A Montañés (Spain) R Ramírez Hidalgo	7^{7}	1	[23]
2	(Sweden) S Aspelin (Czech Republic) F Čermák	6^{2}	6	[21]

Quarterfinals
1	(Poland) M Fyrstenberg (Poland) M Matkowski	6	6
(Czech Republic) T Cibulec (Australia) J Kerr	2	1
(Brazil) M Melo (Brazil) A Sá	7	6
WC	(Portugal) G Elias (Portugal) P Sousa	5	3
(United States) S Lipsky (United States) T Phillips	6^{5}	1
(Argentina) M García (Argentina) S Prieto	7^{7}	6
(South Africa) J Coetzee (Netherlands) R Wassen	6	6
(Spain) A Montañés (Spain) R Ramírez Hidalgo	2	2

Semifinals
1	(Poland) M Fyrstenberg (Poland) M Matkowski	1	6^{3}
(Brazil) M Melo (Brazil) A Sá	6	7^{7}
(Argentina) M García (Argentina) S Prieto	6	7^{7}
(South Africa) J Coetzee (Netherlands) R Wassen	4	6^{4}

Final
(Brazil) M Melo (Brazil) A Sá	3	6	[10]
(Argentina) M García (Argentina) S Prieto	6	2	[6]
