= 2011 Australian Open – Women's singles =

Women's singles
- 2011 Australian Open

Final
- Champion: (Belgium) Kim Clijsters
- Runner-up: (China) Li Na
- Score: 3–6, 6–3, 6–3

Details
- Draw: 128 (12Q / 8WC)
- Seeds: 32

Events
Singles	men	women		boys	girls
Doubles	men	women	mixed	boys	girls
WC Singles	men	women	quad
WC Doubles	men	women	quad
Legends	men	women	mixed
- Australian Open

Kim Clijsters defeated Li Na in the final, 3–6, 6–3, 6–3 to win the women's singles tennis title at the 2011 Australian Open. It was her first Australian Open title and her fourth and last major overall, as well as the 41st and last singles title of her career.

Li was the first Asian player to reach a major singles final, and would go on to win the French Open a few months later. This was the first major where Caroline Wozniacki competed as the world No. 1; she lost to Li in the semifinals, despite having a match point in the second set.

Serena Williams was the two-time reigning champion, but did not participate due to a long-term foot injury.

The fourth-round match between Svetlana Kuznetsova and Francesca Schiavone, which lasted 4 hours and 44 minutes, was the longest women's singles major match, with Schiavone winning in the third set, 16–14.

This marked the last major for two former world No. 1's: Justine Henin and Dinara Safina, who both retired due to injury (Henin's elbow and Safina's back).

== Seeds ==
1. (Denmark) Caroline Wozniacki (semifinals)
2. (Russia) Vera Zvonareva (semifinals)
3. (Belgium) Kim Clijsters (champion)
4. (United States) Venus Williams (third round, retired because of a hip injury)
5. (Australia) Samantha Stosur (third round)
6. (Italy) Francesca Schiavone (quarterfinals)
7. (Serbia) Jelena Janković (second round)
8. (Belarus) Victoria Azarenka (fourth round)
9. (China) Li Na (final)
10. (Israel) Shahar Pe'er (third round)
11. (Belgium) Justine Henin (third round)
12. (Poland) Agnieszka Radwańska (quarterfinals)
13. (Russia) Nadia Petrova (third round)
14. (Russia) Maria Sharapova (fourth round)
15. (France) Marion Bartoli (second round)
16. (Russia) Anastasia Pavlyuchenkova (third round)

17. (France) Aravane Rezaï (first round)
18. (Russia) Maria Kirilenko (second round)
19. (Serbia) Ana Ivanovic (first round)
20. (Estonia) Kaia Kanepi (second round)
21. (Belgium) Yanina Wickmayer (second round)
22. (Italy) Flavia Pennetta (fourth round)
23. (Russia) Svetlana Kuznetsova (fourth round)
24. (Russia) Alisa Kleybanova (second round)
25. (Czech Republic) Petra Kvitová (quarterfinals)
26. (Spain) María José Martínez Sánchez (second round)
27. (Romania) Alexandra Dulgheru (first round)
28. (Slovakia) Daniela Hantuchová (first round)
29. (Slovakia) Dominika Cibulková (third round)
30. (Germany) Andrea Petkovic (quarterfinals)
31. (Czech Republic) Lucie Šafářová (third round)
32. (Bulgaria) Tsvetana Pironkova (second round)

Click on the seed number of a player to go to their draw section.

== Draw ==
Key

- Q = Qualifier
- WC = Wild card
- LL = Lucky loser
- Alt = Alternate
- ITF = ITF entry
- PR = Protected ranking
- SR = Special ranking
- SE = Special exempt
- JE = Junior exempt
- JR = Junior Accelerator Programme entrant
- CO = College Accelerator Programme entrant
- NG = Next Gen Accelerator Program entrant
- w/o = Walkover
- r = Retired
- d = Defaulted

=== Finals ===
Quarterfinals
1	(Denmark) Caroline Wozniacki	3	6	6
6	(Italy) Francesca Schiavone	6	3	3
30	(Germany) Andrea Petkovic	2	4
9	(China) Li Na	6	6
12	(Poland) Agnieszka Radwańska	3	6^{4}
3	(Belgium) Kim Clijsters	6	7^{7}
25	(Czech Republic) Petra Kvitová	2	4
2	(Russia) Vera Zvonareva	6	6

Semifinals
1	(Denmark) Caroline Wozniacki	6	5	3
9	(China) Li Na	3	7	6
3	(Belgium) Kim Clijsters	6	6
2	(Russia) Vera Zvonareva	3	3

Final
9	(China) Li Na	6	3	3
3	(Belgium) Kim Clijsters	3	6	6

=== Top half ===
==== Section 1 ====
First round
1	(Denmark) C Wozniacki	6	6
(Argentina) G Dulko	3	4
(Austria) T Paszek	7^{7}	0	3
(United States) V King	6^{4}	6	6
(Czech Republic) L Hradecká	4	5
(Italy) A Brianti	6	7
(Germany) A Kerber	2	7^{7}	4
29	(Slovakia) D Cibulková	6	6^{4}	6
21	(Belgium) Y Wickmayer	6	2	6
(Australia) J Groth	3	6	4
(Slovenia) P Hercog	4	6^{5}
(Latvia) A Sevastova	6	7^{7}
Q	(Russia) V Manasieva	7	6
(Spain) L Pous Tió	5	2
(Italy) T Garbin	0	0
15	(France) M Bartoli	6	6

Second round
1	(Denmark) C Wozniacki	6	6
(United States) V King	1	0
(Italy) A Brianti	1	6	2
29	(Slovakia) D Cibulková	6	4	6
21	(Belgium) Y Wickmayer	4	2
(Latvia) A Sevastova	6	6
Q	(Russia) V Manasieva	3	6	6
15	(France) M Bartoli	6	3	0

Third round
1	(Denmark) C Wozniacki	6	6
29	(Slovakia) D Cibulková	4	3
(Latvia) A Sevastova	6	6
Q	(Russia) V Manasieva	1	3

Fourth round
1	(Denmark) C Wozniacki	6	6
(Latvia) A Sevastova	3	4

==== Section 2 ====
First round
11	(Belgium) J Henin	5	6	6
Q	(India) S Mirza	7	3	1
Q	(United States) J Hampton	6	4	5
(United Kingdom) E Baltacha	3	6	7
(United States) B Mattek-Sands	1	6	5
Q	(Netherlands) A Rus	6	3	7
(United States) A Riske	3	2
23	(Russia) S Kuznetsova	6	6
32	(Bulgaria) T Pironkova	6	3	6
(France) P Parmentier	4	6	3
(Switzerland) T Bacsinszky	0	3
(Romania) M Niculescu	6	6
(Canada) R Marino	6	4	6
(Japan) J Namigata	2	6	3
(Spain) A Parra Santonja	7^{7}	2	4
6	(Italy) F Schiavone	6^{4}	6	6

Second round
11	(Belgium) J Henin	6	6
(United Kingdom) E Baltacha	1	3
Q	(Netherlands) A Rus	1	4
23	(Russia) S Kuznetsova	6	6
32	(Bulgaria) T Pironkova	4	1
(Romania) M Niculescu	6	6
(Canada) R Marino	3	7	7
6	(Italy) F Schiavone	6	5	9

Third round
11	(Belgium) J Henin	4	6^{8}
23	(Russia) S Kuznetsova	6	7^{10}
(Romania) M Niculescu	0	6^{2}
6	(Italy) F Schiavone	6	7^{7}

Fourth round
23	(Russia) S Kuznetsova	4	6	14
6	(Italy) F Schiavone	6	1	16

==== Section 3 ====
First round
4	(United States) V Williams	6	6
(Italy) S Errani	3	2
(Czech Republic) S Záhlavová	6	6
(Czech Republic) R Voráčová	3	1
Q	(United Kingdom) A Keothavong	7	6
Q	(Russia) Ar Rodionova	5	4
(United States) J Craybas	1	2
30	(Germany) A Petkovic	6	6
20	(Estonia) K Kanepi	2	6	6
(Slovakia) M Rybáriková	6	4	3
(Germany) J Görges	6	4	6
(Romania) E Gallovits-Hall	3	6	3
(Russia) E Vesnina	6	3	3
(France) V Razzano	4	6	6
(Thailand) T Tanasugarn	1	3
14	(Russia) M Sharapova	6	6

Second round
4	(United States) V Williams	6^{6}	6	6
(Czech Republic) S Záhlavová	7^{8}	0	4
Q	(United Kingdom) A Keothavong	6	5	0
30	(Germany) A Petkovic	2	7	6
20	(Estonia) K Kanepi	4	6	4
(Germany) J Görges	6	3	6
(France) V Razzano	6^{3}	3
14	(Russia) M Sharapova	7^{7}	6

Third round
4	(United States) V Williams	0^{r}
30	(Germany) A Petkovic	1
(Germany) J Görges	6	4	4
14	(Russia) M Sharapova	4	6	6

Fourth round
30	(Germany) A Petkovic	6	6
14	(Russia) M Sharapova	2	3

==== Section 4 ====
First round
9	(China) N Li	6	7
(Sweden) S Arvidsson	1	5
(Russia) E Rodina	6	6
WC	(Australia) O Rogowska	3	1
(Czech Republic) Z Ondrášková	3	2
WC	(Australia) J Dokić	6	6
(Czech Republic) B Záhlavová-Strýcová	6	3	7
17	(France) A Rezaï	0	6	5
28	(Slovakia) D Hantuchová	6^{3}	6	7
(Russia) R Kulikova	7^{7}	3	9
(Croatia) K Šprem	6	4	2
(South Africa) C Scheepers	4	6	6
(Austria) P Mayr-Achleitner	5	4
(Czech Republic) A Hlaváčková	7	6
Q	(Germany) K Wörle	0	2
8	(Belarus) V Azarenka	6	6

Second round
9	(China) N Li	6	6
(Russia) E Rodina	3	2
WC	(Australia) J Dokić	6^{3}	1
(Czech Republic) B Záhlavová-Strýcová	7^{7}	6
(Russia) R Kulikova	4	6	5
(South Africa) C Scheepers	6	4	7
(Czech Republic) A Hlaváčková	4	4
8	(Belarus) V Azarenka	6	6

Third round
9	(China) N Li	6	6
(Czech Republic) B Záhlavová-Strýcová	2	1
(South Africa) C Scheepers	3	3
8	(Belarus) V Azarenka	6	6

Fourth round
9	(China) N Li	6	6
8	(Belarus) V Azarenka	3	3

=== Bottom half ===
==== Section 5 ====
First round
7	(Serbia) J Janković	6	7^{7}
(Russia) A Kudryavtseva	0	6^{5}
(Ukraine) K Bondarenko	6	3	6
(China) S Peng	2	6	8
WC	(France) C Garcia	7	4	6
(United States) V Lepchenko	5	6	3
(Japan) A Morita	6	6
27	(Romania) A Dulgheru	4	4
24	(Russia) A Kleybanova	6	6
Q	(United States) I Falconi	1	0
Q	(Luxembourg) A Kremer	3	6	2
(Romania) S Halep	6	3	6
WC	(Australia) S Ferguson	6^{6}	6	3
Q	(Croatia) P Martić	7^{8}	0	6
(Japan) K Date-Krumm	4	6	5
12	(Poland) A Radwańska	6	4	7

Second round
7	(Serbia) J Janković	6^{3}	3
(China) S Peng	7^{7}	6
WC	(France) C Garcia	4	4
(Japan) A Morita	6	6
24	(Russia) A Kleybanova	4	6^{2}
(Romania) S Halep	6	7^{7}
Q	(Croatia) P Martić	3	4
12	(Poland) A Radwańska	6	6

Third round
(China) S Peng	6	3	6
(Japan) A Morita	1	6	3
(Romania) S Halep	1	2
12	(Poland) A Radwańska	6	6

Fourth round
(China) S Peng	5	6	5
12	(Poland) A Radwańska	7	3	7

==== Section 6 ====
First round
13	(Russia) N Petrova	6	6
(Russia) K Pervak	2	1
WC	(Australia) A Molik	1	6	8
(Italy) R Vinci	6	3	6
(Switzerland) P Schnyder	2	3
Q	(Ukraine) L Tsurenko	6	6
(Russia) E Makarova	3	6	10
19	(Serbia) A Ivanovic	6	4	8
26	(Spain) MJ Martínez Sánchez	6	4	6
(Hungary) G Arn	3	6	2
Q	(United States) C Vandeweghe	2	1
(France) A Cornet	6	6
(United States) C McHale	6	3	4
(Spain) C Suárez Navarro	4	6	6
(Russia) D Safina	0	0
3	(Belgium) K Clijsters	6	6

Second round
13	(Russia) N Petrova	6	6
WC	(Australia) A Molik	4	1
Q	(Ukraine) L Tsurenko	6^{6}	1
(Russia) E Makarova	7^{8}	6
26	(Spain) MJ Martínez Sánchez	5	1
(France) A Cornet	7	6
(Spain) C Suárez Navarro	1	3
3	(Belgium) K Clijsters	6	6

Third round
13	(Russia) N Petrova	2	6	6
(Russia) E Makarova	6	3	8
(France) A Cornet	6^{3}	3
3	(Belgium) K Clijsters	7^{7}	6

Fourth round
(Russia) E Makarova	6^{3}	2
3	(Belgium) K Clijsters	7^{7}	6

==== Section 7 ====
First round
5	(Australia) S Stosur	6	6
WC	(United States) L Davis	1	1
(Italy) ME Camerin	3	6	1
(Russia) V Dushevina	6	3	6
(Belarus) O Govortsova	3	4
(Russia) A Chakvetadze	6	6
WC	(Australia) S Peers	2	4
25	(Czech Republic) P Kvitová	6	6
22	(Italy) F Pennetta	6	6
(Australia) An Rodionova	2	1
(Spain) L Domínguez Lino	6	6
(Sweden) J Larsson	2	1
(Romania) S Cîrstea	6	6
(Croatia) M Lučić	4	2
(France) M Johansson	1	1
10	(Israel) S Pe'er	6	6

Second round
5	(Australia) S Stosur	6	6
(Russia) V Dushevina	3	2
(Russia) A Chakvetadze	3	4
25	(Czech Republic) P Kvitová	6	6
22	(Italy) F Pennetta	6	6
(Spain) L Domínguez Lino	2	2
(Romania) S Cîrstea	3	2
10	(Israel) S Pe'er	6	6

Third round
5	(Australia) S Stosur	6^{5}	3
25	(Czech Republic) P Kvitová	7^{7}	6
22	(Italy) F Pennetta	3	7^{7}	6
10	(Israel) S Pe'er	6	6^{3}	4

Fourth round
25	(Czech Republic) P Kvitová	3	6	6
22	(Italy) F Pennetta	6	3	3

==== Section 8 ====
First round
16	(Russia) A Pavlyuchenkova	6	7^{7}
(Belgium) K Flipkens	4	6^{4}
(Uzbekistan) A Amanmuradova	4	2
(Germany) K Barrois	6	6
(Spain) A Medina Garrigues	0	1
(Czech Republic) I Benešová	6	6
(Italy) R Oprandi	3	7	6
18	(Russia) M Kirilenko	6	5	8
31	(Czech Republic) L Šafářová	7	4	6
(China) S Zhang	5	6	1
(Czech Republic) K Zakopalová	6	3	6
(United States) M Oudin	1	6	1
(Serbia) B Jovanovski	7	6
WC	(Chinese Taipei) K-c Chang	5	1
(Austria) S Bammer	2	1
2	(Russia) V Zvonareva	6	6

Second round
16	(Russia) A Pavlyuchenkova	6	6
(Germany) K Barrois	2	2
(Czech Republic) I Benešová	6	6
18	(Russia) M Kirilenko	3	1
31	(Czech Republic) L Šafářová	6	6^{2}	7
(Czech Republic) K Zakopalová	3	7^{7}	5
(Serbia) B Jovanovski	6	3	1
2	(Russia) V Zvonareva	2	6	6

Third round
16	(Russia) A Pavlyuchenkova	3	6	5
(Czech Republic) I Benešová	6	1	7
31	(Czech Republic) L Šafářová	3	6^{9}
2	(Russia) V Zvonareva	6	7^{11}

Fourth round
(Czech Republic) I Benešová	4	1
2	(Russia) V Zvonareva	6	6

== Championship match statistics ==
Category	(Belgium) Clijsters	(China) Li
1st serve %	56/86 (65%)	69/96 (72%)
1st serve points won	37 of 56 = 66%	36 of 69 = 52%
2nd serve points won	12 of 30 = 40%	11 of 27 = 41%
Total service points won	49 of 86 = 56.98%	47 of 96 = 48.96%
Aces	1	1
Double faults	3	4
Winners	22	24
Unforced errors	26	40
Net points won	8 of 14 = 57%	13 of 23 = 57%
Break points converted	7 of 17 = 41%	6 of 12 = 50%
Return points won	49 of 96 = 51%	37 of 86 = 43%
Total points won	98	84

Preceded by 2010 US Open – Women's singles	Grand Slam women's singles	Succeeded by 2011 French Open – Women's singles
