= 2006 Estoril Open – Men's singles =

Men's singles
- 2006 Estoril Open

Final
- Champion: (Argentina) David Nalbandian
- Runner-up: (Russia) Nikolay Davydenko
- Score: 6–3, 6–4

Details
- Draw: 32
- Seeds: 8

Events
Singles	men	women
Doubles	men	women
- Portugal Open

In the men's singles final, David Nalbandian defeated Nikolay Davydenko with a score of 6–3, 6–4.

== Seeds ==
1. (Argentina) David Nalbandian (champion)
2. (Russia) Nikolay Davydenko (finalist)
3. (Spain) ~~Tommy Robredo~~ (withdrew due to abdominal injury)
4. (France) Gaël Monfils (second round)
5. (Russia) Dmitry Tursunov (second round)
6. (Spain) Carlos Moyà (semifinals)
7. (Chile) Nicolás Massú (second round)
8. (Belgium) Christophe Rochus (first round)

== Draw ==
Key

- Q = Qualifier
- WC = Wild card
- LL = Lucky loser
- Alt = Alternate
- ITF = ITF entry
- PR = Protected ranking
- SR = Special ranking
- SE = Special exempt
- JE = Junior exempt
- JR = Junior Accelerator Programme entrant
- CO = College Accelerator Programme entrant
- NG = Next Gen Accelerator Program entrant
- w/o = Walkover
- r = Retired
- d = Defaulted

=== Finals ===
Semifinals
1	(Argentina) David Nalbandian	7	6
(Spain) Albert Portas	5	1
6/WC	(Spain) Carlos Moyà	6	2	2
2	(Russia) Nikolay Davydenko	3	6	6

Final
1	(Argentina) David Nalbandian	6	6
2	(Russia) Nikolay Davydenko	3	4

=== Top half ===
First round
1	(Argentina) D Nalbandian	7	7
(France) N Mahut	5	5
LL	(France) J Chardy	7	6
(Chinese Taipei) Y-t Wang	5	1
LL	(Spain) D Luque-Velasco	6	6^{5}	4
WC	(Portugal) F Gil	1	7^{7}	6
LL	(Portugal) G Elias	2	1
5	(Russia) D Tursunov	6	6
4/WC	(France) G Monfils	6	6
(Romania) R Sabău	1	2
(Costa Rica) J A Marín	3	4
(Spain) A Portas	6	6
(Czech Republic) L Dlouhý	6	5	3
(United States) J Gimelstob	3	7	6
(Netherlands) R Sluiter	0	5
7	(Chile) N Massú	6	6

Second round
1	(Argentina) D Nalbandian	6	7^{7}
LL	(France) J Chardy	1	6^{0}
WC	(Portugal) F Gil	4	6	6
5	(Russia) D Tursunov	6	4	1
4/WC	(France) G Monfils	6	6^{3}	4
5	(Spain) A Portas	3	7^{7}	6
(United States) J Gimelstob	2	7^{7}	6
7	(Chile) N Massú	6	6^{3}	4

Quarterfinals
1	(Argentina) D Nalbandian	6	6
WC	(Portugal) F Gil	2	1
(Spain) A Portas	6	6
(United States) J Gimelstob	4	3

Semifinals
1	(Argentina) D Nalbandian	7	6
(Spain) A Portas	5	1

=== Bottom half ===
First round
6/WC	(Spain) C Moyà	6	6
(Brazil) F Saretta	3	4
Q	(Argentina) G Marcaccio	6	6
(Czech Republic) T Zíb	4	2
(Spain) G García López	6	4	6
Q	(Italy) L Azzaro	4	6	4
(Argentina) C Berlocq	6	6
LL	(Spain) D Pérez	0	1
8	(Belgium) C Rochus	2	0
(Luxembourg) G Müller	6	6
(Ecuador) N Lapentti	6^{3}	6	6
Q	(Poland) M Przysiężny	7^{7}	4	4
(Russia) M Safin	6	6
Q	(Italy) Fabio Fognini	1	4
(United States) V Spadea	6^{3}	3
2	(Russia) N Davydenko	7^{7}	6

Second round
6/WC	(Spain) C Moyà	6	7
Q	(Argentina) G Marcaccio	1	5
(Spain) G García López	6^{11}	7	7^{7}
(Argentina) C Berlocq	7^{13}	5	6^{5}
(Luxembourg) G Müller	6	6
(Ecuador) N Lapentti	1	4
(Russia) M Safin	6	1	1
2	(Russia) N Davydenko	4	6	6

Quarterfinals
6/WC	(Spain) C Moyà	7^{7}	6
(Spain) G García López	6^{4}	4
(Luxembourg) G Müller	4	4
2	(Russia) N Davydenko	6	6

Semifinals
6/WC	(Spain) C Moyà	6	2	2
2	(Russia) N Davydenko	3	6	6
