= 2006 Estoril Open =

- Date: 1–7 May
- Edition: 17th (ATP) / 10th (WTA)
- Surface: Clay / outdoor
- Location: Oeiras, Portugal

Champions

Men's singles
- (Argentina) David Nalbandian

Women's singles
- (China) Zheng Jie

Men's doubles
- (Czech Republic) Lukáš Dlouhý / (Czech Republic) Pavel Vízner

Women's doubles
- (China) Li Ting / (China) Sun Tiantian
- Estoril Open

The 2006 Estoril Open was a tennis tournament played on outdoor clay courts. This event was the 17th edition of the Estoril Open for the men (the 10th for the women), included in the 2006 ATP Tour International Series and in the 2006 WTA Tour Tier IV Series. Both the men's and the women's events took place at the Estoril Court Central, in Oeiras, Portugal, from 1 May through 7 May 2006.

== Finals ==
=== Men's singles ===
(Argentina) David Nalbandian defeated (Russia) Nikolay Davydenko, 6–3, 6–4

=== Women's singles ===
(China) Zheng Jie defeated (China) Li Na, 6–7^{(5–7)}, 7–5, retired

=== Men's doubles ===
(Czech Republic) Lukáš Dlouhý / (Czech Republic) Pavel Vízner defeated (Argentina) Lucas Arnold / (Czech Republic) Leoš Friedl, 6–3, 6–1

=== Women's doubles ===
(China) Li Ting / (China) Sun Tiantian defeated (Argentina) Gisela Dulko / (Spain) María Sánchez Lorenzo, 6–2, 6–2
