= 2008 Estoril Open =

- Date: 12–20 April
- Edition: 19th (ATP) / 12th (WTA)
- Surface: Clay / outdoor
- Location: Oeiras, Portugal
- Venue: Estádio Nacional

Champions

Men's singles
- (Switzerland) Roger Federer

Women's singles
- (Russia) Maria Kirilenko

Men's doubles
- (South Africa) Jeff Coetzee / (South Africa) Wesley Moodie

Women's doubles
- (Russia) Maria Kirilenko / (Italy) Flavia Pennetta
- Estoril Open

The 2008 Estoril Open was a tennis tournament played on outdoor clay courts. It was the 19th edition of the Estoril Open for the men (the 12th for the women), and was part of the International Series of the 2008 ATP Tour, and of the Tier IV Series of the 2008 WTA Tour. Both the men's and the women's events took place at the Estádio Nacional in Oeiras, Portugal, from April 14 through April 20, 2008.

The men's draw featured World No. 1, reigning Wimbledon and US Open champion, Australian Open semifinalist Roger Federer, ATP No. 4, Miami Masters winner and 2003 Estoril titlist Nikolay Davydenko, and Rotterdam semifinalist Ivo Karlović. Other seeded players were Australian Open quarterfinalist and Adelaide runner-up Jarkko Nieminen, Rotterdam semifinalist Gilles Simon, Nicolas Mahut, Marc Gicquel and Michael Berrer.

The women's draw was headlined by Viña del Mar and Acapulco champion Flavia Pennetta, Auckland quarterfinalist Maria Kirilenko, and Antwerp runner-up Karin Knapp. Also present in the field were 2005 Estoril titlist Lucie Šafářová, 2000 Estoril semifinalist Tathiana Garbin, Klára Zakopalová, Sofia Arvidsson and Camille Pin.

== Finals ==
=== Men's singles ===
(Switzerland) Roger Federer defeated (Russia) Nikolay Davydenko 7–6^{(7–5)}, 1–2 retired

- It was Roger Federer's 1st title of the year, and his 54th overall.

=== Women's singles ===
(Russia) Maria Kirilenko defeated (Czech Republic) Iveta Benešová, 6–4, 6–2

- It was Maria Kirilenko's 1st title of the year, and her 3rd overall.

=== Men's doubles ===
(South Africa) Jeff Coetzee / (South Africa) Wesley Moodie defeated (United Kingdom) Jamie Murray / (Zimbabwe) Kevin Ullyett, 6–2, 4–6, [10–8]

=== Women's doubles ===
(Russia) Maria Kirilenko / (Italy) Flavia Pennetta defeated (Bosnia and Herzegovina) Mervana Jugić-Salkić / (Turkey) İpek Şenoğlu, 6–4, 6–4
