= Gréta Arn =

Hungarian tennis player (born 1979)

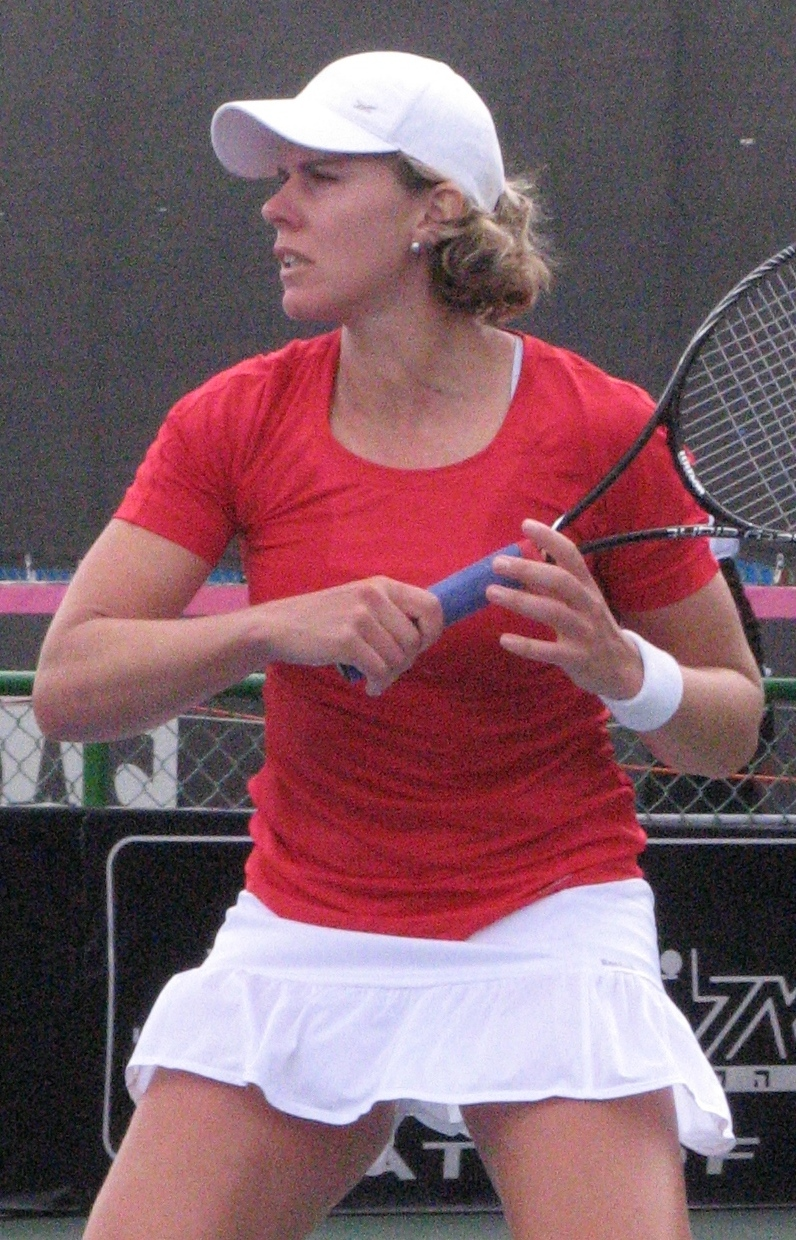
- Arn in 2013
- Country (sports): Hungary (2008–present); Germany (1997–2008)
- Born: 13 April 1979 (age 47) Budapest, Hungary
- Height: 1.80 m (5 ft 11 in)
- Turned pro: 1997
- Retired: 13 January 2021
- Plays: Right (two-handed backhand)
- Prize money: $1,103,890

Singles
- Career record: 486–352
- Career titles: 2 WTA, 5 ITF
- Highest ranking: No. 40 (16 May 2011)

Grand Slam singles results
- Australian Open: 3R (2012)
- French Open: 1R (2001, 2002, 2011, 2012)
- Wimbledon: 3R (2010)
- US Open: 2R (2012)

Doubles
- Career record: 69–75
- Career titles: 4 ITF
- Highest ranking: No. 175 (4 December 2000)

Grand Slam doubles results
- Australian Open: 1R (2012)
- French Open: 1R (2011, 2012)
- US Open: 1R (2011)

Other doubles tournaments
- Olympic Games: 1R (2008)

Team competitions
- Fed Cup: 9–7

Gréta Arn (born 13 April 1979) is a Hungarian former professional tennis player of Danube Swabian German descent.

She has won two titles on the WTA Tour, the 2007 Estoril Open in Portugal, and the 2011 ASB Classic in Auckland, New Zealand, as well as four ITF titles in singles. She reached her career-high singles ranking of world No. 40 on 16 May 2011. She has picked up wins against Mary Pierce at the 2002 Acura Classic and Maria Sharapova at the 2011 ASB Classic.

== Personal life ==
Arn was born in Budapest, Hungary. After playing for Germany with dual Hungarian citizenship for nine years, she chose for the 2008 Fed Cup to compete for Hungary alongside Ágnes Szávay. She also chose to play for her nation of birth full-time.

== Career ==
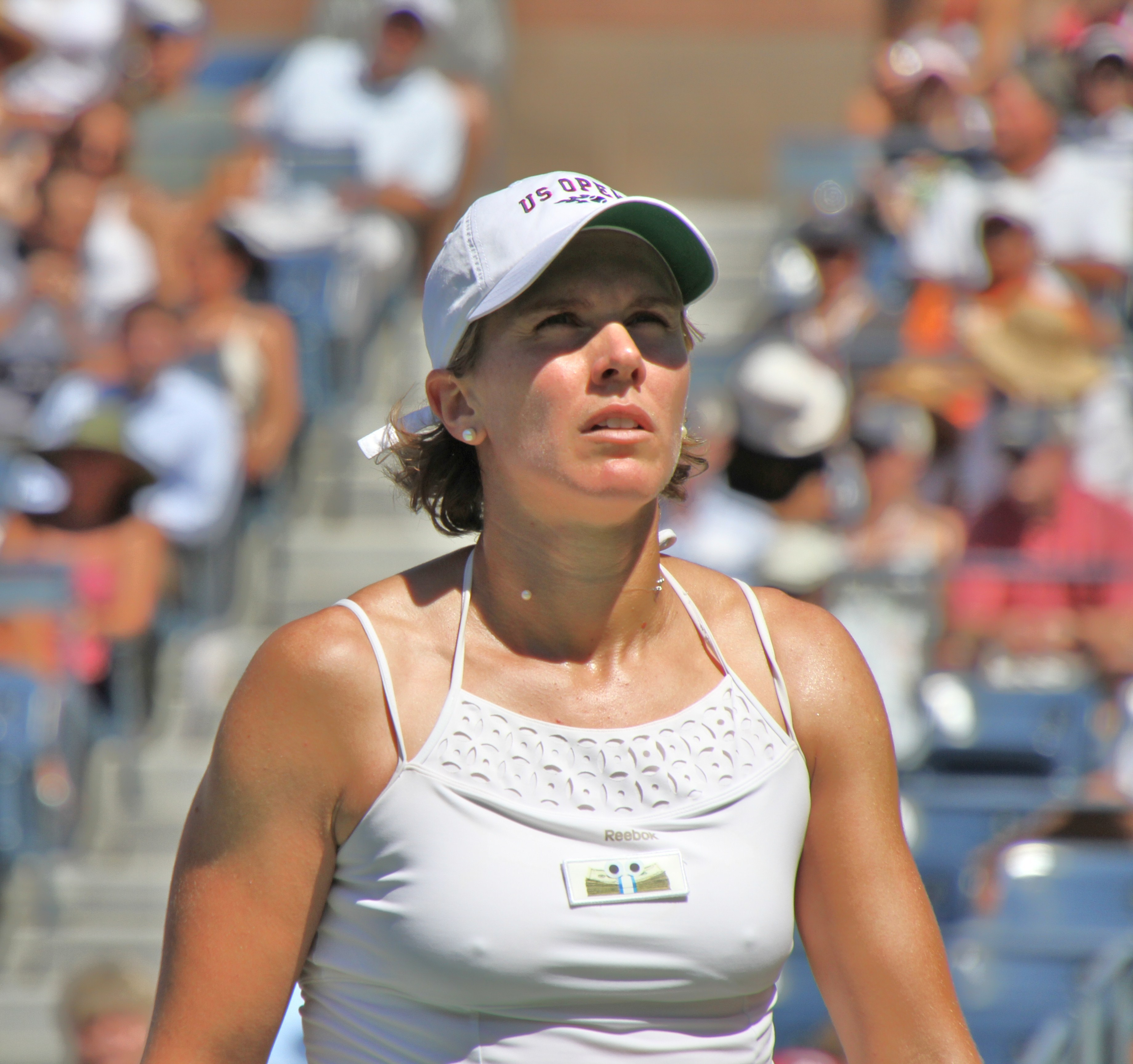
Arn in her first-round match against Kim Clijsters at the 2010 US Open

In 1997, Arn won her first title on the ITF Women's Circuit at Stockholm. In 1999, she won her second ITF title at Glasgow. In 2004, at Bad Saulgau, she won her third $10k title.

In 2006, Arn won a $25k event in Fort Walton Beach. In 2007, she won her first title on the WTA Tour as a qualifier ranked No. 176 in the world, becoming the lowest ranked and first qualifier to win a WTA event in 2007. In the Tier IV 2007 Estoril Open final she defeated Victoria Azarenka, saving two match points at 4–5 in the third set.

At the 2010 Wimbledon Championships, Arn qualified and reached the third round of a Grand Slam tournament for the first time at the age of 31. In the first round, she beat 34th seed Kateryna Bondarenko before following it up with a win over former top-10 player Alicia Molik. Her run was ended by 2007 Wimbledon finalist Marion Bartoli in the third round. At the 2010 US Open, Arn was pitted against second seeded defending champion Kim Clijsters. She lost in straight sets. Arn qualified for the WTA Premier tournament in Tokyo, by defeating Chan Yung-jan and Elena Baltacha. In the main draw she then defeated fellow qualifier Laura Robson in the first round, before losing to top seed Caroline Wozniacki.

In her first event of 2011, at the ASB Classic in Auckland, New Zealand, Arn beat Zuzana Ondrášková. Arn then defeated eighth seed Sofia Arvidsson, saving five match points along the way. She followed it up with the biggest win of her career by defeating top seed and former world No. 1 Maria Sharapova. Arn won her semifinal match against fourth seed Julia Görges in straight sets to book a final berth against defending champion and second seed Yanina Wickmayer for the title. Arn went on to defeat Wickmayer in straight sets to become the 2011 ASB Classic champion and add her second title win.

At the 2012 Australian Open, Arn defeated Rebecca Marino in the first round. In the second round, she won a very tight battle against 17th seed Dominika Cibulková to make her second Grand Slam third round appearance and set up an encounter with Serena Williams, to whom she lost in straight sets. Seeded sixth at the Monterrey Open in February, she advanced to the semifinals before losing to Alexandra Cadanțu.

Arn announced her retirement in January 2014, after no longer being active since the 2013 Wimbledon Championships where she lost in the first round of qualifying.

Almost four years later, at the age of 38, Arn made a comeback on the ITF Circuit. In September 2017, she reached the final of an $25k event in Balatonboglár, Hungary, losing to top seed Polona Hercog.

Arn's retirement was again announced in January 2021.

== Grand Slam performance timelines ==
Key
W	F	SF	QF	#R	RR	Q#	P#	DNQ	A	Z#	PO	G	S	B	NMS	NTI	P	NH

(W) winner; (F) finalist; (SF) semifinalist; (QF) quarterfinalist; (#R) rounds 4, 3, 2, 1; (RR) round-robin stage; (Q#) qualification round; (P#) preliminary round; (DNQ) did not qualify; (A) absent; (Z#) Davis/Fed Cup Zonal Group (with number indication) or (PO) play-off; (G) gold, (S) silver or (B) bronze Olympic/Paralympic medal; (NMS) not a Masters tournament; (NTI) not a Tier I tournament; (P) postponed; (NH) not held; (SR) strike rate (events won / competed); (W–L) win–loss record.
To avoid confusion and double counting, these charts are updated at the conclusion of a tournament or when the player's participation has ended.

=== Singles ===
Tournament	2000	2001	2002	2003	2004	2005	2006	2007	2008	2009	2010	2011	2012	2013
Australian Open	A	2R	2R	1R	A	A	A	A	Q1	A	A	1R	3R	1R
French Open	Q3	1R	1R	Q2	A	A	A	Q3	Q2	Q1	A	1R	1R	A
Wimbledon	1R	Q1	2R	Q1	A	A	A	1R	Q1	Q3	3R	A	1R	Q1
US Open	1R	1R	1R	Q1	A	A	Q1	1R	Q1	A	1R	1R	2R	A

=== Doubles ===
Tournament	2011	2012	2013
Australian Open	A	1R	A
French Open	1R	1R	A
Wimbledon	A	A	A
US Open	1R	A	A

== WTA Tour finals ==
=== Singles: 2 (2 titles) ===
Winner — Legend
Grand Slam tournaments
Tier I / Premier M & Premier 5
Tier II / Premier (0–0)
Tier III/IV / International (2–0)

Outcome	No.	Date	Tournament	Surface	Opponent	Score
Winner	1.	6 May 2007	Estoril, Portugal	Clay	(Belarus) Victoria Azarenka	2–6, 6–1, 7–6^{(7–3)}
Winner	2.	8 January 2011	Auckland, New Zealand	Hard	(Belgium) Yanina Wickmayer	6–3, 6–3

== ITF finals ==
=== Singles: 9 (5 titles, 4 runner–ups) ===
Legend
$60,000 tournaments
$25,000 tournaments
$10,000 tournaments

Result	W–L	Date	Tournament	Tier	Surface	Opponent	Score
Win	1–0	Oct 1997	ITF Stockholm, Sweden	10,000	Hard (i)	(Germany) Athina Briegel	6–2, 6–3
Win	2–0	Oct 1999	GB Pro-Series Glasgow, UK	10,000	Carpet (i)	(India) Manisha Malhotra	w/o
Win	3–0	Jul 2004	ITF Bad Saulgau, Germany	10,000	Clay	(Germany) Tanja Ostertag	6–4, 6–2
Loss	3–1	Sep 2005	GB Pro-Series Glasgow, UK	25,000	Hard (i)	(Germany) Kristina Barrois	3–6, 6–3, 4–6
Loss	3–2	Nov 2005	ITF Nuriootpa, Australia	25,000	Hard (i)	(Australia) Anastasia Rodionova	3–6, 1–6
Win	4–2	Jan 2006	ITF Fort Walton Beach, United States	25,000	Hard	(Italy) Valentina Sassi	7–5, 6–2
Loss	4–3	Apr 2007	ITF Pelham, US	25,000	Clay	(United States) Edina Gallovits-Hall	3–6, 5–7
Loss	4–4	Sep 2017	ITF Balatonboglár, Hungary	25,000	Clay	(Slovenia) Polona Hercog	1–6, 2–6
Win	5–4	Oct 2017	Challenger de Saguenay, Canada	60,000	Hard (i)	(Netherlands) Bibiane Schoofs	6–1, 6–2

=== Doubles (4 titles, 9 runner–ups) ===
Legend
$25,000 tournaments
$10,000 tournaments

Result	No.	Date	Location	Surface	Partner	Opponents	Score
Winner	1.	14 September 1998	Biograd, Croatia	Clay	(Croatia) Lana Miholcek	(Switzerland) Diane Asensio (Bosnia and Herzegovina) Mervana Jugić-Salkić	6–3, 6–2
Runner-up	1.	16 November 1998	Biel, Switzerland	Hard (i)	(Hungary) Katalin Miskolczi	(Czech Republic) Dája Bedáňová (Germany) Lydia Steinbach	2–6, 1–6
Runner-up	2.	5 April 1999	Makarska, Croatia	Clay	(Hungary) Petra Mandula	(Czech Republic) Gabriela Chmelinová (Czech Republic) Olga Vymetálková	6–0, 3–6, 6–7^{(3)}
Runner-up	3.	23 August 1999	Hechingen, Germany	Clay	(Hungary) Eszter Molnár	(Germany) Jennifer Tinnacher (Sweden) Maria Wolfbrandt	4–6, 3–6
Runner-up	4.	3 October 1999	Glasgow, UK	Carpet (i)	(India) Manisha Malhotra	(United Kingdom) Lizzie Jelfs (Republic of Ireland) Karen Nugent	w/o
Winner	2.	6 March 2000	Haikou, China	Hard	(United Kingdom) Julie Pullin	(South Korea) Chae Kyung-yee (Japan) Ryoko Takemura	7–5, 6–4
Runner-up	5.	3 July 2001	Stuttgart, Germany	Clay	(Australia) Amanda Grahame	(Czech Republic) Dája Bedáňová (Czech Republic) Eva Martincová	6–0, 3–6, 3–6
Runner-up	6.	3 October 2004	Nantes, France	Hard (i)	(Hungary) Rita Kuti-Kis	(France) Iryna Brémond (Belarus) Tatsiana Uvarova	4–6, 6–4, 6–7^{(5)}
Runner-up	7.	3 April 2005	Rome, Italy	Clay	(Czech Republic) Janette Bejlková	(Spain) Adriana González Peñas (Switzerland) Romina Oprandi	3–6, 3–6
Winner	3.	13 November 2005	Port Pirie, Australia	Hard	(United States) Sunitha Rao	(Australia) Monique Adamczak (Australia) Christina Horiatopoulos	6–4, 3–6, 6–2
Winner	4.	19 November 2005	Nuriootpa, Australia	Hard	(Australia) Anastasia Rodionova	(Australia) Casey Dellacqua (Australia) Trudi Musgrave	6–4, 1–6, 7–5
Runner-up	8.	27 November 2005	Mount Gambier, Australia	Hard	(Australia) Anastasia Rodionova	(Japan) Ryoko Fuda (United States) Sunitha Rao	1–6, ret.
Runner-up	9.	10 December 2005	Přerov, Czech Republic	Carpet (i)	(Estonia) Margit Rüütel	(Czech Republic) Lucie Hradecká (Czech Republic) Gabriela Chmelinová	6–3, 4–6, 4–6
