= 2012 Australian Open – Men's singles qualifying =

Men's singles qualifying
- 2012 Australian Open

Events
Singles	men	women		boys	girls
Doubles	men	women	mixed	boys	girls
WC Singles	men	women	quad
WC Doubles	men	women	quad
Legends	men	women	mixed

Qualification
Singles	men	women
- Australian Open

This article displays the qualifying for the singles tournament.

== Players ==
=== Seeds ===
1. (Japan) Go Soeda (second round)
2. (Slovenia) Grega Žemlja (second round)
3. (Germany) Daniel Brands (first round)
4. (Turkey) Marsel İlhan (first round)
5. (Russia) Igor Andreev (second round)
6. (South Africa) Izak van der Merwe (first round)
7. (Slovakia) Lukáš Lacko (qualified)
8. (Brazil) Rogério Dutra da Silva (first round)
9. (Canada) Vasek Pospisil (second round)
10. (Tunisia) Malek Jaziri (first round)
11. (South Africa) Rik de Voest (qualifying competition, lucky loser)
12. (Germany) Rainer Schüttler (second round)
13. (Lithuania) Ričardas Berankis (second round)
14. (Italy) Simone Bolelli (qualifying competition)
15. (Spain) Arnau Brugués-Davi (second round)
16. (Spain) Daniel Muñoz-de la Nava (first round)
17. (Czech Republic) Jan Hájek (first round)
18. (Argentina) Eduardo Schwank (second round)
19. (Russia) Evgeny Donskoy (first round)
20. (Kazakhstan) Andrey Golubev (qualified)
21. (United States) Rajeev Ram (first round)
22. (Estonia) Jürgen Zopp (qualified)
23. (France) Arnaud Clément (first round)
24. (Belgium) Ruben Bemelmans (first round)
25. (Ukraine) Sergei Bubka (qualifying competition)
26. (Germany) Simon Greul (first round)
27. (Italy) Matteo Viola (qualified)
28. (Argentina) Facundo Bagnis (first round)
29. (France) Florent Serra (qualified)
30. (France) Augustin Gensse (second round)
31. (Germany) Dustin Brown (first round)
32. (United Kingdom) James Ward (qualified)

== Qualifiers ==
1. (France) Florent Serra
2. (Germany) Peter Gojowczyk
3. (Thailand) Danai Udomchoke
4. (Kazakhstan) Andrey Golubev
5. (United Kingdom) James Ward
6. (Netherlands) Jesse Huta Galung
7. (Slovakia) Lukáš Lacko
8. (United States) Denis Kudla
9. (Estonia) Jürgen Zopp
10. (Italy) Matteo Viola
11. (Russia) Alexandre Kudryavtsev
12. (Spain) Roberto Bautista-Agut
13. (Denmark) Frederik Nielsen
14. (United States) Alex Kuznetsov
15. (Germany) Björn Phau
16. (Ukraine) Illya Marchenko

== Lucky loser ==
1. (South Africa) Rik de Voest

== Qualifying draw ==
Key

- Q = Qualifier
- WC = Wild card
- LL = Lucky loser
- Alt = Alternate
- ITF = ITF entry
- PR = Protected ranking
- SR = Special ranking
- SE = Special exempt
- JE = Junior exempt
- JR = Junior Accelerator Programme entrant
- CO = College Accelerator Programme entrant
- NG = Next Gen Accelerator Program entrant
- w/o = Walkover
- r = Retired
- d = Defaulted

=== First qualifier ===
First round
1	(Japan) Go Soeda	6	6
(Slovakia) Pavol Červenák	2	4
WC	(Australia) Andrew Harris	1	5
(Ukraine) Denys Molchanov	6	7
(Czech Republic) Dušan Lojda	4	4
(France) Maxime Teixeira	6	6
PR	(United States) Robby Ginepri	6^{2}	3
29	(France) Florent Serra	7^{7}	6

Second round
1	(Japan) Go Soeda	4	2
(Ukraine) Denys Molchanov	6	6
(France) Maxime Teixeira	7^{10}	3	1
29	(France) Florent Serra	6^{8}	6	6

Qualifying competition
(Ukraine) Denys Molchanov	3	3
29	(France) Florent Serra	6	6

=== Second qualifier ===
First round
2	(Slovenia) Grega Žemlja	2	7^{7}	8
(Germany) Denis Gremelmayr	6	6^{5}	6
(France) Grégoire Burquier	1	3
(Germany) Peter Gojowczyk	6	6
(Spain) Javier Martí	6	6
(Finland) Harri Heliövaara	0	3
(Netherlands) Thiemo de Bakker	7^{7}	4	8
31	(Germany) Dustin Brown	6^{3}	6	6

Second round
2	(Slovenia) Grega Žemlja	2	1
(Germany) Peter Gojowczyk	6	6
(Spain) Javier Martí	6	5	4
(Netherlands) Thiemo de Bakker	4	7	6

Qualifying competition
(Germany) Peter Gojowczyk	6	6
(Netherlands) Thiemo de Bakker	1	1

=== Third qualifier ===
First round
3	(Germany) Daniel Brands	2	6	2
(Thailand) Danai Udomchoke	6	4	6
(France) Romain Jouan	4	7^{7}	7
(Spain) Gerard Granollers-Pujol	6	6^{5}	5
(Italy) Simone Vagnozzi	3	2
(Canada) Peter Polansky	6	6
WC	(Australia) James Lemke	6	2	2
30	(France) Augustin Gensse	4	6	6

Second round
(Thailand) Danai Udomchoke	6	6
(France) Romain Jouan	3	3
(Canada) Peter Polansky	6	6
30	(France) Augustin Gensse	3	2

Qualifying competition
(Thailand) Danai Udomchoke	6	6
(Canada) Peter Polansky	4	2

=== Fourth qualifier ===
First round
4	(Turkey) Marsel İlhan	6	3	2
(Bosnia and Herzegovina) Amer Delić	4	6	6
WC	(Australia) Maverick Banes	5	3
(Belgium) Yannick Mertens	7	6
(Russia) Denis Matsukevich	0	2
(Moldova) Radu Albot	6	6
(Canada) Érik Chvojka	6	3	2
20	(Kazakhstan) Andrey Golubev	3	6	6

Second round
(Bosnia and Herzegovina) Amer Delić	3	7^{7}	4
(Belgium) Yannick Mertens	6	6^{5}	6
(Moldova) Radu Albot	4	4
20	(Kazakhstan) Andrey Golubev	6	6

Qualifying competition
(Belgium) Yannick Mertens	1	3
20	(Kazakhstan) Andrey Golubev	6	6

=== Fifth qualifier ===
First round
5	(Russia) Igor Andreev	6	6
(Moldova) Roman Borvanov	3	4
(France) Axel Michon	3	5
(Netherlands) Igor Sijsling	6	7
(Czech Republic) Ivo Minář	7^{7}	6
WC	(Australia) Luke Saville	6^{3}	1
(Spain) Iñigo Cervantes Huegun	7^{7}	6^{3}	1
32	(United Kingdom) James Ward	6^{2}	7^{7}	6

Second round
5	(Russia) Igor Andreev	6^{6}	3
(Netherlands) Igor Sijsling	7^{7}	6
(Czech Republic) Ivo Minář	3	6	3
32	(United Kingdom) James Ward	6	1	6

Qualifying competition
(Netherlands) Igor Sijsling	6^{5}	2
32	(United Kingdom) James Ward	7^{7}	6

=== Sixth qualifier ===
First round
6	(South Africa) Izak van der Merwe	4	2
(Chinese Taipei) Jimmy Wang	6	6
(France) David Guez	6	7^{7}
(United States) Michael Yani	4	6^{2}
(Germany) Peter Torebko	3	4
(Brazil) Caio Zampieri	6	6
(Netherlands) Jesse Huta Galung	6	3	6
26	(Germany) Simon Greul	3	6	3

Second round
(Chinese Taipei) Jimmy Wang	3	6	4
(France) David Guez	6	1	6
(Brazil) Caio Zampieri	0	0
(Netherlands) Jesse Huta Galung	6	6

Qualifying competition
(France) David Guez	4	0
(Netherlands) Jesse Huta Galung	6	6

=== Seventh qualifier ===
First round
7	(Slovakia) Lukáš Lacko	6	6
(Czech Republic) Jaroslav Pospíšil	0	3
(Slovenia) Aljaž Bedene	6	6
(Czech Republic) Jan Mertl	2	2
(France) Ludovic Walter	2	0
(France) Jonathan Dasnières de Veigy	6	6
(Germany) Andre Begemann	5	6^{3}
25	(Ukraine) Sergei Bubka	7	7^{7}

Second round
7	(Slovakia) Lukáš Lacko	6	6
(Slovenia) Aljaž Bedene	2	0
(France) Jonathan Dasnières de Veigy	3	3
25	(Ukraine) Sergei Bubka	6	6

Qualifying competition
7	(Slovakia) Lukáš Lacko	6	6
25	(Ukraine) Sergei Bubka	2	4

=== Eighth qualifier ===
First round
9	(Canada) Vasek Pospisil	3	7^{7}	6
PR	(Australia) John Millman	6	6^{5}	2
(Kazakhstan) Yuri Schukin	6	3	5
(Australia) Carsten Ball	4	6	7
(Serbia) Nikola Ćirić	7	6^{2}	2
(United States) Denis Kudla	5	7^{7}	6
(Colombia) Juan Sebastián Cabal	3	1
18	(Argentina) Eduardo Schwank	6	6

Second round
9	(Canada) Vasek Pospisil	6^{7}	4
(Australia) Carsten Ball	7^{9}	6
(United States) Denis Kudla	6	6
18	(Argentina) Eduardo Schwank	4	2

Qualifying competition
(Australia) Carsten Ball	6^{1}	5
(United States) Denis Kudla	7^{7}	7

=== Ninth qualifier ===
First round
10	(Tunisia) Malek Jaziri	2	6^{5}
(United States) Tim Smyczek	6	7^{7}
(Switzerland) Stéphane Bohli	6	6
(Republic of Ireland) Conor Niland	3	2
WC	(Australia) Nick Kyrgios	7^{7}	3	2
(France) Mathieu Rodrigues	6^{3}	6	6
(Belarus) Uladzimir Ignatik	6	5	7
22	(Estonia) Jürgen Zopp	2	7	9

Second round
(United States) Tim Smyczek	6	7
(Switzerland) Stéphane Bohli	4	5
(France) Mathieu Rodrigues	7^{7}	3	9
22	(Estonia) Jürgen Zopp	6^{4}	6	11

Qualifying competition
(United States) Tim Smyczek	2	7	3
22	(Estonia) Jürgen Zopp	6	5	6

=== Tenth qualifier ===
First round
11	(South Africa) Rik de Voest	6	4	6
(Belgium) Maxime Authom	0	6	1
WC	(Australia) John-Patrick Smith	7^{7}	4	3
(Uzbekistan) Farrukh Dustov	6^{5}	6	6
(Colombia) Robert Farah	2	6	4
(Croatia) Antonio Veić	6	3	6
(Serbia) Dušan Lajović	2	7^{8}	6
27	(Italy) Matteo Viola	6	6^{6}	8

Second round
11	(South Africa) Rik de Voest	6^{4}	6	6
(Uzbekistan) Farrukh Dustov	7^{7}	3	1
(Croatia) Antonio Veić	7^{7}	5	4
27	(Italy) Matteo Viola	6^{1}	7	6

Qualifying competition
11	(South Africa) Rik de Voest	6	6^{5}	4
27	(Italy) Matteo Viola	4	7	6

=== Eleventh qualifier ===
First round
12	(Germany) Rainer Schüttler	7^{7}	7^{7}
(Australia) Chris Guccione	6^{5}	6^{4}
(Russia) Alexandre Kudryavtsev	6	4	6
(Chinese Taipei) Yang Tsung-hua	3	6	4
(Spain) Adrián Menéndez Maceiras	6	6
(Colombia) Alejandro González	4	1
(Portugal) João Sousa	6	7
19	(Russia) Evgeny Donskoy	3	5

Second round
12	(Germany) Rainer Schüttler	6^{4}	6	6
(Russia) Alexandre Kudryavtsev	7^{7}	0	8
(Spain) Adrián Menéndez Maceiras	4	6^{4}
(Portugal) João Sousa	6	7^{7}

Qualifying competition
(Russia) Alexandre Kudryavtsev	7	2	6
(Portugal) João Sousa	5	6	4

=== Twelfth qualifier ===
First round
13	(Lithuania) Ričardas Berankis	6	6
(France) Fabrice Martin	4	4
WC	(Australia) Michael Look	4	4
(Spain) Roberto Bautista-Agut	6	6
(Argentina) Juan Pablo Brzezicki	6^{5}	6^{2}
(Brazil) André Ghem	7^{7}	7^{7}
(Canada) Pierre-Ludovic Duclos	6	1	6
28	(Argentina) Facundo Bagnis	3	6	4

Second round
13	(Lithuania) Ričardas Berankis	7^{7}	3	1
(Spain) Roberto Bautista-Agut	6^{3}	6	6
(Brazil) André Ghem	6^{3}	6	6
(Canada) Pierre-Ludovic Duclos	7^{7}	3	4

Qualifying competition
(Spain) Roberto Bautista-Agut	7^{7}	6
(Brazil) André Ghem	6^{2}	3

=== Thirteenth qualifier ===
First round
14	(Italy) Simone Bolelli	4	7^{7}	6
(Switzerland) Michael Lammer	6	6^{5}	4
(Russia) Konstantin Kravchuk	5	6	6
(Lithuania) Laurynas Grigelis	7	3	2
(Germany) Dominik Meffert	3	6^{2}
(Australia) Peter Luczak	6	7^{7}
(Denmark) Frederik Nielsen	7	6
21	(United States) Rajeev Ram	5	4

Second round
14	(Italy) Simone Bolelli	6	3	12
(Russia) Konstantin Kravchuk	4	6	10
(Australia) Peter Luczak	2	5
(Denmark) Frederik Nielsen	6	7

Qualifying competition
14	(Italy) Simone Bolelli	7^{7}	4	2
(Denmark) Frederik Nielsen	6^{4}	6	6

=== Fourteenth qualifier ===
First round
15	(Spain) Arnau Brugués-Davi	7^{7}	6
(Austria) Philipp Oswald	6^{3}	3
(United States) Alex Kuznetsov	6	7^{8}
(Brazil) Guilherme Clézar	1	6^{6}
(Italy) Gianluca Naso	4	7^{7}	9
(Australia) Matt Reid	6	6^{5}	7
(Japan) Yuichi Sugita	6	6
24	(Belgium) Ruben Bemelmans	1	4

Second round
15	(Spain) Arnau Brugués-Davi	2	2
(United States) Alex Kuznetsov	6	6
(Italy) Gianluca Naso	4	4
(Japan) Yuichi Sugita	6	6

Qualifying competition
(United States) Alex Kuznetsov	3	6	6
(Japan) Yuichi Sugita	6	3	2

=== Fifteenth qualifier ===
First round
16	(Spain) Daniel Muñoz-de la Nava	6	0	3
(Belgium) David Goffin	4	6	6
(Germany) Sebastian Rieschick	6	5	4
(France) Guillaume Rufin	3	7	6
(Israel) Amir Weintraub	4	0
(Italy) Marco Crugnola	6	6
(Germany) Björn Phau	7	6
23	(France) Arnaud Clément	5	2

Second round
(Belgium) David Goffin	4	5
(France) Guillaume Rufin	6	7
(Italy) Marco Crugnola	1	1
(Germany) Björn Phau	6	6

Qualifying competition
(France) Guillaume Rufin	6^{5}	7	1
(Germany) Björn Phau	7^{7}	5	6

=== Sixteenth qualifier ===
First round
8	(Brazil) Rogério Dutra da Silva	4	1
(Ukraine) Illya Marchenko	6	6
(Slovakia) Kamil Čapkovič	6	7
WC	(Czech Republic) Jiří Veselý	1	5
(South Africa) Raven Klaasen	4	3
(Czech Republic) Jan Hernych	6	6
(Austria) Martin Fischer	3	7	6
17	(Czech Republic) Jan Hájek	6	5	0

Second round
(Ukraine) Illya Marchenko	2	6	6
(Slovakia) Kamil Čapkovič	6	3	2
(Czech Republic) Jan Hernych
(Austria) Martin Fischer	w/o

Qualifying competition
(Ukraine) Illya Marchenko	7	6
(Austria) Martin Fischer	5	3
