= 2012 Australian Open – Women's singles qualifying =

Women's singles qualifying
- 2012 Australian Open

Events
Singles	men	women		boys	girls
Doubles	men	women	mixed	boys	girls
WC Singles	men	women	quad
WC Doubles	men	women	quad
Legends	men	women	mixed

Qualification
Singles	men	women
- Australian Open

This article displays the qualifying draw for the women's singles event at the 2012 Australian Open.

== Players ==
=== Seeds ===
1. (Russia) Vesna Dolonc (first round, retired)
2. (Uzbekistan) Akgul Amanmuradova (first round)
3. (Czech Republic) Andrea Hlaváčková (qualified)
4. (Spain) Arantxa Parra Santonja (second round)
5. (Russia) Alexandra Panova (qualifying competition)
6. (Japan) Misaki Doi (first round)
7. (United States) Coco Vandeweghe (first round)
8. (Russia) Regina Kulikova (first round, retired)
9. (Russia) Valeria Savinykh (qualified)
10. (Russia) Anastasia Pivovarova (first round)
11. (United States) Varvara Lepchenko (qualified)
12. (Japan) Erika Sema (first round)
13. (Croatia) Mirjana Lučić-Baroni (second round)
14. (United Kingdom) Laura Robson (qualified)
15. (France) Caroline Garcia (qualifying competition)
16. (Russia) Nina Bratchikova (qualified)
17. (United States) Alison Riske (qualified)
18. (United States) Tetiana Luzhanska (first round)
19. (Austria) Yvonne Meusburger (qualifying competition)
20. (Switzerland) Stefanie Vögele (qualified)
21. (Hungary) Tímea Babos (second round)
22. (Kazakhstan) Sesil Karatantcheva (first round)
23. (United States) Jamie Hampton (qualified)
24. (France) Kristina Mladenovic (second round)

=== Qualifiers ===
1. (United Kingdom) Laura Robson
2. (France) Irena Pavlovic
3. (Czech Republic) Andrea Hlaváčková
4. (Switzerland) Stefanie Vögele
5. (United States) Alison Riske
6. (Portugal) Maria João Koehler
7. (Argentina) Paula Ormaechea
8. (Russia) Nina Bratchikova
9. (Russia) Valeria Savinykh
10. (Chinese Taipei) Chang Kai-chen
11. (United States) Varvara Lepchenko
12. (United States) Jamie Hampton

== Qualifying draw ==
Key

- Q = Qualifier
- WC = Wild card
- LL = Lucky loser
- Alt = Alternate
- ITF = ITF entry
- PR = Protected ranking
- SR = Special ranking
- SE = Special exempt
- JE = Junior exempt
- JR = Junior Accelerator Programme entrant
- CO = College Accelerator Programme entrant
- NG = Next Gen Accelerator Program entrant
- w/o = Walkover
- r = Retired
- d = Defaulted

=== First qualifier ===
First round
1	(Russia) Vesna Dolonts	0	0^{r}
(Netherlands) Kiki Bertens	6	4
(Slovakia) Jana Čepelová	4	3
(Ukraine) Olga Savchuk	6	6
(Italy) Anna Floris	3	6	6
(Japan) Misa Eguchi	6	4	2
(United States) Melanie Oudin	3	4
14	(United Kingdom) Laura Robson	6	6

Second round
(Netherlands) Kiki Bertens	4	7^{10}	3
(Ukraine) Olga Savchuk	6	6^{8}	6
(Italy) Anna Floris	3	4
14	(United Kingdom) Laura Robson	6	6

Qualifying competition
(Ukraine) Olga Savchuk	1	6^{2}
14	(United Kingdom) Laura Robson	6	7^{7}

=== Second qualifier ===
First round
2	(Uzbekistan) Akgul Amanmuradova	3	3
(Romania) Mădălina Gojnea	6	6
(Turkey) Çağla Büyükakçay	4	6	2
(Hungary) Réka-Luca Jani	6	3	6
(France) Irena Pavlovic	1	6	7
(Czech Republic) Kristýna Plíšková	6	3	5
(Georgia (country)) Margalita Chakhnashvili	2	1
21	(Hungary) Tímea Babos	6	6

Second round
(Romania) Mădălina Gojnea	6	6
(Hungary) Réka-Luca Jani	1	0
(France) Irena Pavlovic	6	1	8
21	(Hungary) Tímea Babos	4	6	6

Qualifying competition
(Romania) Mădălina Gojnea	1	0^{r}
(France) Irena Pavlovic	6	2

=== Third qualifier ===
First round
3	(Czech Republic) Andrea Hlaváčková	6	6
(Slovakia) Kristína Kučová	1	1
(Israel) Julia Glushko	6	3	6
(Japan) Rika Fujiwara	1	6	3
(United States) Madison Brengle	6	3	6
(Italy) Nastassya Burnett	1	6	4
(Slovenia) Petra Rampre	6	3	4
15	(France) Caroline Garcia	1	6	6

Second round
3	(Czech Republic) Andrea Hlaváčková	7	6
(Israel) Julia Glushko	5	2
(United States) Madison Brengle	2	3
15	(France) Caroline Garcia	6	6

Qualifying competition
3	(Czech Republic) Andrea Hlaváčková	6	6
15	(France) Caroline Garcia	4	4

=== Fourth qualifier ===
First round
4	(Spain) Arantxa Parra Santonja	6	7
(Spain) Leticia Costas-Moreira	1	5
(Portugal) Michelle Larcher de Brito	6	7
(Germany) Kathrin Wörle	3	5
(Romania) Mihaela Buzărnescu	6	6
(Hong Kong) Zhang Ling	1	2
(Spain) Lara Arruabarrena-Vecino	4	2
20	(Switzerland) Stefanie Vögele	6	6

Second round
4	(Spain) Arantxa Parra Santonja	3	6	2
(Portugal) Michelle Larcher de Brito	6	4	6
(Romania) Mihaela Buzărnescu	3	6	2
20	(Switzerland) Stefanie Vögele	6	4	6

Qualifying competition
(Portugal) Michelle Larcher de Brito	5	6	4
20	(Switzerland) Stefanie Vögele	7	3	6

=== Fifth qualifier ===
First round
5	(Russia) Alexandra Panova	6	6
WC	(Australia) Sally Peers	2	4
(South Africa) Chanel Simmonds	1	2
(France) Claire Feuerstein	6	6
(United Kingdom) Naomi Broady	6	5	6
(United States) Ashley Weinhold	4	7	3
(Thailand) Noppawan Lertcheewakarn	5	5
17	(United States) Alison Riske	7	7

Second round
5	(Russia) Alexandra Panova	6	6
(France) Claire Feuerstein	4	4
(United Kingdom) Naomi Broady	6	2	0
17	(United States) Alison Riske	3	6	6

Qualifying competition
5	(Russia) Alexandra Panova	4	2
17	(United States) Alison Riske	6	6

=== Sixth qualifier ===
First round
6	(Japan) Misaki Doi	6	6^{3}	6
(Portugal) Maria João Koehler	4	7^{7}	8
(Italy) Maria Elena Camerin	7	6
(Ukraine) Mariya Koryttseva	5	3
(United States) Julia Boserup	7	6
WC	(Australia) Viktorija Rajicic	5	1
(Belgium) Tamaryn Hendler	1	0
24	(France) Kristina Mladenovic	6	6

Second round
(Portugal) Maria João Koehler	3	6	6
(Italy) Maria Elena Camerin	6	3	4
(United States) Julia Boserup	7^{7}	5	6
24	(France) Kristina Mladenovic	6^{3}	7	2

Qualifying competition
(Portugal) Maria João Koehler	6	6
(United States) Julia Boserup	2	2

=== Seventh qualifier ===
First round
7	(United States) Coco Vandeweghe	4	1
(Argentina) Paula Ormaechea	6	6
(Chinese Taipei) Hsieh Su-wei	6	7^{7}
(China) Lu Jingjing	4	6^{1}
(Germany) Sarah Gronert	6	6
WC	(Belgium) An-Sophie Mestach	4	3
(United States) Julia Cohen	5	0
19	(Austria) Yvonne Meusburger	7	6

Second round
(Argentina) Paula Ormaechea	3	6	6
(Chinese Taipei) Hsieh Su-wei	6	4	2
(Germany) Sarah Gronert	4	4
19	(Austria) Yvonne Meusburger	6	6

Qualifying competition
(Argentina) Paula Ormaechea	6	6
19	(Austria) Yvonne Meusburger	1	3

=== Eighth qualifier ===
First round
8	(Russia) Regina Kulikova	6	4	0^{r}
WC	(Russia) Irina Khromacheva	4	6	1
(Kazakhstan) Yaroslava Shvedova	4	6	9
(Netherlands) Bibiane Schoofs	6	3	11
(Hungary) Melinda Czink	6	6
WC	(Australia) Tammi Patterson	1	3
(Czech Republic) Karolína Plíšková	1	2
16	(Russia) Nina Bratchikova	6	6

Second round
WC	(Russia) Irina Khromacheva	6	6
(Netherlands) Bibiane Schoofs	2	4
(Hungary) Melinda Czink	3	6^{5}
16	(Russia) Nina Bratchikova	6	7^{7}

Qualifying competition
WC	(Russia) Irina Khromacheva	3	4
16	(Russia) Nina Bratchikova	6	6

=== Ninth qualifier ===
First round
9	(Russia) Valeria Savinykh	6	6
(Ukraine) Yuliya Beygelzimer	2	2
(Poland) Marta Domachowska	6	6
(Italy) Corinna Dentoni	2	2
(Italy) Karin Knapp	6	6
(Russia) Ekaterina Bychkova	4	3
(Japan) Kurumi Nara	7^{9}	3	6
22	(Kazakhstan) Sesil Karatantcheva	6^{7}	6	4

Second round
9	(Russia) Valeria Savinykh	6	6
(Poland) Marta Domachowska	1	4
(Italy) Karin Knapp	2	2
(Japan) Kurumi Nara	6	6

Qualifying competition
9	(Russia) Valeria Savinykh	6	6
(Japan) Kurumi Nara	3	3

=== Tenth qualifier ===
First round
10	(Russia) Anastasia Pivovarova	3	3
(Russia) Ekaterina Ivanova	6	6
(Japan) Yurika Sema	4	3
(Chinese Taipei) Chang Kai-chen	6	6
(France) Victoria Larrière	6	6
WC	(Australia) Arina Rodionova	4	4
(United States) Chichi Scholl	2	2
13	(Croatia) Mirjana Lučić-Baroni	6	6

Second round
(Russia) Ekaterina Ivanova	6	4	3
(Chinese Taipei) Chang Kai-chen	3	6	6
(France) Victoria Larrière	6	6
13	(Croatia) Mirjana Lučić-Baroni	1	4

Qualifying competition
(Chinese Taipei) Chang Kai-chen	4	6	6
(France) Victoria Larrière	6	4	3

=== Eleventh qualifier ===
First round
11	(United States) Varvara Lepchenko	6	6
(Colombia) Mariana Duque-Mariño	1	0
WC	(Australia) Storm Sanders	5	3
(Bulgaria) Elitsa Kostova	7	6
(United States) Jill Craybas	1	7	7
(Spain) Estrella Cabeza Candela	6	5	5
(Serbia) Aleksandra Krunić	6	1	6
18	(United States) Tetiana Luzhanska	3	6	3

Second round
11	(United States) Varvara Lepchenko	6	6
(Bulgaria) Elitsa Kostova	1	2
(United States) Jill Craybas	3	6^{5}
(Serbia) Aleksandra Krunić	6	7^{7}

Qualifying competition
11	(United States) Varvara Lepchenko	6	6
(Serbia) Aleksandra Krunić	1	2

=== Twelfth qualifier ===
First round
12	(Japan) Erika Sema	1	2
(Belgium) Kirsten Flipkens	6	6
(Puerto Rico) Monica Puig	7	6
(Romania) Elena Bogdan	5	4
(Russia) Olga Puchkova	6^{3}	6	6
WC	(Australia) Monique Adamczak	7^{7}	3	4
(Bulgaria) Dia Evtimova	2	1
23	(United States) Jamie Hampton	6	6

Second round
(Belgium) Kirsten Flipkens	7	6
(Puerto Rico) Monica Puig	5	3
(Russia) Olga Puchkova	7^{7}	3	0
23	(United States) Jamie Hampton	6^{5}	6	6

Qualifying competition
(Belgium) Kirsten Flipkens	5	4
23	(United States) Jamie Hampton	7	6
