= 2014 Trophée des Alpilles – Doubles =

Doubles
- 2014 Trophée des Alpilles

Final
- Champion: (France) Pierre-Hugues Herbert (Russia) Konstantin Kravchuk
- Runner-up: (France) David Guez (France) Martin Vaïsse
- Score: 6–1, 7–6^{(7–3)}

Events
Singles	Doubles
← 2013 ·	Trophée des Alpilles	· 2015 →

Pierre-Hugues Herbert and Konstantin Kravchuk won the title, beating David Guez and Martin Vaïsse 6–1, 7–6^{(7–3)}

== Seeds ==
1. (United Kingdom) Ken Skupski / (United Kingdom) Neal Skupski (semifinals)
2. (Belarus) Sergey Betov / (Belarus) Aliaksandr Bury (quarterfinals)
3. (France) Pierre-Hugues Herbert / (Russia) Konstantin Kravchuk (champions)
4. (Belgium) Ruben Bemelmans / (Canada) Adil Shamasdin (quarterfinals)

== Draw ==
=== Key ===
- Q = Qualifier
- WC = Wild card
- LL = Lucky loser
- Alt = Alternate
- SE = Special exempt
- PR = Protected ranking
- ITF = ITF entry
- JE = Junior exempt
- w/o = Walkover
- r = Retired
- d = Defaulted
- SR = Special ranking

=== Draw ===
First round
1	(United Kingdom) K Skupski (United Kingdom) N Skupski	7^{9}	6
(Belarus) E Gerasimov (Japan) H Moriya	6^{7}	4
(Italy) Erik Crepaldi (Croatia) F Veger	7	6
(France) G Burquier (France) V Millot	5	4
3	(France) P-H Herbert (Russia) K Kravchuk	6	6
(Austria) M Fischer (Switzerland) M Lammer	2	2
(Australia) J Kerr (France) F Martin	6	6
WC	(France) Constantin Belot (France) Noe Khlif	0	2
(France) D Guez (France) M Vaïsse	7^{9}	6
WC	(Russia) D Medvedev (Ukraine) Vitalii Shcherba	6^{7}	4
WC	(France) Alexandre Buchner (France) Enguerran Tringali	4	1
4	(Belgium) R Bemelmans (Canada) A Shamasdin	6	6
(Ukraine) S Bubka (Ukraine) D Molchanov	6	6
(France) M Chazal (France) Maxime Tchoutakian	2	4
(Russia) D Matsukevich (Germany) A Zverev	2	2
2	(Belarus) S Betov (Belarus) A Bury	6	6

Quarterfinals
1	(United Kingdom) K Skupski (United Kingdom) N Skupski	3	6	[15]
(Italy) E Crepaldi (Croatia) F Veger	6	3	[13]
3	(France) P-H Herbert (Russia) K Kravchuk	6	6
(Australia) J Kerr (France) F Martin	4	3
(France) D Guez (France) M Vaïsse	6	6
4	(Belgium) R Bemelmans (Canada) A Shamasdin	1	4
(Ukraine) S Bubka (Ukraine) D Molchanov	6	3	[10]
2	(Belarus) S Betov (Belarus) A Bury	4	6	[6]

Semifinals
1	(United Kingdom) K Skupski (United Kingdom) N Skupski	3	3
3	(France) P-H Herbert (Russia) K Kravchuk	6	6
(France) D Guez (France) M Vaïsse	6	6
(Ukraine) S Bubka (Ukraine) D Molchanov	4	3

Final
3	(France) P-H Herbert (Russia) K Kravchuk	6	7^{7}
(France) D Guez (France) M Vaïsse	1	6^{3}
