= 2012 Australian Open – Boys' singles =

Boys' singles
- 2012 Australian Open

Final
- Champion: (Australia) Luke Saville
- Runner-up: (Canada) Filip Peliwo
- Score: 6–3, 5–7, 6–4

Events
Singles	men	women		boys	girls
Doubles	men	women	mixed	boys	girls
WC Singles	men	women	quad
WC Doubles	men	women	quad
Legends	men	women	mixed
- Australian Open

Jiří Veselý was the defending champion, but he was ineligible to compete this year. World number one, Luke Saville of Australia led the field. The Aussie junior tennis player headed up the top ten seeds which included Thiago Monteiro, 2011 Wimbledon junior finalist Liam Broady, Kaichi Uchida, Frederico Ferreira Silva, Andrew Harris, Kyle Edmund, Stefano Napolitano, Nikola Milojević and Adam Pavlásek.

The start of the 2012 Australian Open saw all the seeds apart from Monteiro, Cagnina and Farren made it to the second round. The biggest upset of the first round was Brazilian Thiago Monteiro losing to Australian wild card Jack Schipanski. Julien Cagnina lost to French Mathias Bourgue and American Connor Farren went to French Laurent Lokoli. The second round witnessed all the seeds go through except Broady lost to Robin Staněk, Napolitano to Joshua Ward-Hibbert and Kyrgios to Marek Routa. The third round is also where the seeds meet for the first time. Kimmer Coppejans and Hossam exited to higher seeds. Seventh seeded Edmund defeated eleventh seeded Coppejans and No. 1 seeded Saville defeated sixteenth seeded Hossam. The biggest upset of the third round was tenth seeded Pavlásek defeating fifth seeded Silva and sixth seeded Harris losing to American qualifier Mackenzie McDonald. Milojevic lost to Joshua Ward-Hibbert and Pöllänen to Staněk. The quarter finals saw Saville end Edmund's run and Pavlásek end Uchida's run successfully making their way into the semifinals. The semifinals witnessed Saville taking out Pavlásek while Filip Peliwo overcame McDonald. In the final, Luke Saville defeated Filip Peliwo to claim his first Junior Boys' Singles Australian Open title and second grand slam title of his career.

== Seeds ==
1. (Australia) Luke Saville (champion)
2. (Brazil) Thiago Monteiro (first round)
3. (United Kingdom) Liam Broady (second round)
4. (Japan) Kaichi Uchida (quarterfinals)
5. (Portugal) Frederico Ferreira Silva (third round)
6. (Australia) Andrew Harris (third round)
7. (United Kingdom) Kyle Edmund (quarterfinals)
8. (Italy) Stefano Napolitano (second round)
9. (Serbia) Nikola Milojević (third round)
10. (Czech Republic) Adam Pavlásek (semifinals)
11. (Belgium) Kimmer Coppejans (third round)
12. (Belgium) Julien Cagnina (first round)
13. (Australia) Nick Kyrgios (second round)
14. (United States) Connor Farren (first round)
15. (Finland) Herkko Pöllänen (third round)
16. (Egypt) Karim Hossam (third round)

== Draw ==
Key

- Q = Qualifier
- WC = Wild card
- LL = Lucky loser
- Alt = Alternate
- ITF = ITF entry
- PR = Protected ranking
- SR = Special ranking
- SE = Special exempt
- JE = Junior exempt
- JR = Junior Accelerator Programme entrant
- CO = College Accelerator Programme entrant
- NG = Next Gen Accelerator Program entrant
- w/o = Walkover
- r = Retired
- d = Defaulted

=== Finals ===
Quarterfinals
1	(Australia) Luke Saville	7	7
7	(United Kingdom) Kyle Edmund	5	5
4	(Japan) Kaichi Uchida	3	3
10	(Czech Republic) Adam Pavlásek	6	6
Q	(United States) Mackenzie McDonald	0	6	6
(Czech Republic) Robin Staněk	6	4	2
(United Kingdom) Joshua Ward-Hibbert	3	2
(Canada) Filip Peliwo	6	6

Semifinals
1	(Australia) Luke Saville	6	6
10	(Czech Republic) Adam Pavlásek	3	4
Q	(United States) Mackenzie McDonald	4	4
(Canada) Filip Peliwo	6	6

Final
1	(Australia) Luke Saville	6	5	6
(Canada) Filip Peliwo	3	7	4

=== Top half ===
==== Section 1 ====
First round
1	(Australia) Luke Saville	6	6
(Israel) Or Ram-Harel	1	1
(France) Lucas Pouille	6	6
(Germany) Jannis Kahlke	2	2
SE	(Australia) Alexander Babanine	3	1
Q	(Brazil) Pedro Dumont	6	6
Q	(Japan) Takashi Saito	2	2
16	(Egypt) Karim Hossam	6	6
11	(Belgium) Kimmer Coppejans	7	6
WC	(Australia) Thanasi Kokkinakis	5	2
(Croatia) Borna Ćorić	6	7^{7}
(Greece) Markos Kalovelonis	4	6^{3}
WC	(Australia) Daniel Guccione	4	6	6
(Spain) Pol Toledo Bagué	6	0	8
SE	(France) Alexandre Favrot	6	4	1
7	(United Kingdom) Kyle Edmund	4	6	6

Second round
1	(Australia) L Saville	6	3	6
(France) L Pouille	3	6	4
Q	(Brazil) P Dumont	5	6^{9}
16	(Egypt) K Hossam	7	7^{11}
11	(Belgium) K Coppejans	4	6	6
(Croatia) B Ćorić	6	2	0
(Spain) P Toledo Bagué	6	1	1
7	(United Kingdom) K Edmund	4	6	6

Third round
1	(Australia) L Saville	6	6
16	(Egypt) K Hossam	2	2
11	(Belgium) K Coppejans	6^{7}	1
7	(United Kingdom) K Edmund	7^{9}	6

Quarterfinal
1	(Australia) L Saville	7	7
7	(United Kingdom) K Edmund	5	5

==== Section 2 ====
First round
4	(Japan) Kaichi Uchida	7	7^{7}
Q	(Italy) Pietro Licciardi	5	6^{4}
(Germany) Daniel Masur	0	6^{8}
(United Kingdom) Luke Bambridge	6	7^{10}
(Romania) Ștefan Vinți	3	6^{6}
WC	(Australia) Bradley Mousley	6	7^{8}
(France) Laurent Lokoli	6	6
14	(United States) Connor Farren	2	3
10	(Czech Republic) Adam Pavlásek	4	6	6
LL	(Chinese Taipei) Ho Chih-jen	6	4	2
(Australia) James Frawley	1	2
(Serbia) Peđa Krstin	6	6
(Russia) Evgeny Karlovskiy	6	7^{12}
(Denmark) Mikael Torpegaard	1	6^{10}
WC	(Australia) Li Tu	4	4
5	(Portugal) Frederico Ferreira Silva	6	6

Second round
4	(Japan) K Uchida	6	7^{10}
(United Kingdom) L Bambridge	4	6^{8}
WC	(Australia) B Mousley	6	4	4
(France) L Lokoli	0	6	6
10	(Czech Republic) A Pavlásek	7^{7}	6
(Serbia) P Krstin	6^{5}	1
(Russia) E Karlovskiy	3	4
5	(Portugal) FF Silva	6	6

Third round
4	(Japan) K Uchida	6	6
(France) L Lokoli	3	3
10	(Czech Republic) A Pavlásek	6	6
5	(Portugal) FF Silva	3	2

Quarterfinal
4	(Japan) K Uchida	3	3
10	(Czech Republic) A Pavlásek	6	6

=== Bottom half ===
==== Section 3 ====
First round
6	(Australia) Andrew Harris	6	3	6
(Croatia) Filip Veger	2	6	4
(South Africa) Wayne Montgomery	6^{5}	7	6
(Israel) Bar Tzuf Botzer	7^{7}	5	1
(Uzbekistan) Temur Ismailov	1	6^{2}
Q	(United States) Mackenzie McDonald	6	7^{7}
(France) Mathias Bourgue	6	3	6
12	(Belgium) Julien Cagnina	4	6	3
15	(Finland) Herkko Pöllänen	6	6
(Thailand) Wishaya Trongcharoenchaikul	3	3
(Slovakia) Patrik Fabian	3	4
WC	(Australia) Christopher O'Connell	6	6
(Czech Republic) Robin Staněk	7	6
WC	(Australia) Jordan Thompson	5	0
Q	(Italy) Matteo Donati	5	3
3	(United Kingdom) Liam Broady	7	6

Second round
6	(Australia) A Harris	6	6
(South Africa) W Montgomery	4	2
Q	(United States) M McDonald	6	6
(France) M Bourgue	2	1
15	(Finland) H Pöllänen	3	7	7
WC	(Australia) C O'Connell	6	5	5
(Czech Republic) R Staněk	6	6
3	(United Kingdom) L Broady	4	1

Third round
6	(Australia) A Harris	2	3
Q	(United States) M McDonald	6	6
15	(Finland) H Pöllänen	1	2
(Czech Republic) R Staněk	6	6

Quarterfinal
Q	(United States) M McDonald	0	6	6
(Czech Republic) R Staněk	6	4	2

==== Section 4 ====
First round
8	(Italy) Stefano Napolitano	6	6
Q	(United States) Trey Strobel	4	3
(United Kingdom) Joshua Ward-Hibbert	6	6
WC	(Australia) Matthew Tanza	1	2
Q	(India) Arjun Kadhe	4	6^{4}
(France) Quentin Halys	6	7^{7}
(Australia) Jay Andrijic	2	0
9	(Serbia) Nikola Milojević	6	6
13	(Australia) Nick Kyrgios	6	6
(South Korea) Kim Jae-hwan	1	2
(Germany) Kevin Kaczynski	6	5	0
(Czech Republic) Marek Routa	2	7	6
(Canada) Filip Peliwo	3	6	6
Q	(Japan) Ken Onishi	6	1	4
WC	(Australia) Jack Schipanski	2	6	6
2	(Brazil) Thiago Monteiro	6	3	4

Second round
8	(Italy) S Napolitano	3	4
(United Kingdom) J Ward-Hibbert	6	6
(France) Q Halys	3	6	3
9	(Serbia) N Milojević	6	2	6
13	(Australia) N Kyrgios	6^{7}	4
(Czech Republic) M Routa	7^{9}	6
(Canada) F Peliwo	6	6
WC	(Australia) J Schipanski	2	4

Third round
(United Kingdom) J Ward-Hibbert	6	6
9	(Serbia) N Milojević	3	2
(Czech Republic) M Routa	6	3	3
(Canada) F Peliwo	4	6	6

Quarterfinal
(United Kingdom) J Ward-Hibbert	3	2
(Canada) F Peliwo	6	6
