= 2012 Australian Open – Boys' doubles =

Boys' doubles
- 2012 Australian Open

Final
- Champion: (United Kingdom) Liam Broady (United Kingdom) Joshua Ward-Hibbert
- Runner-up: (Czech Republic) Adam Pavlásek (Croatia) Filip Veger
- Score: 6–3, 6–2

Events
Singles	men	women		boys	girls
Doubles	men	women	mixed	boys	girls
WC Singles	men	women	quad
WC Doubles	men	women	quad
Legends	men	women	mixed
- Australian Open

Filip Horanský and Jiří Veselý were the defending champions but were both ineligible to compete.

Liam Broady and Joshua Ward-Hibbert won the title, defeating Adam Pavlásek and Filip Veger in the final 6–3, 6–2.

== Seeds ==
1. (Serbia) Nikola Milojević / (Japan) Kaichi Uchida (first round)
2. (Belgium) Julien Cagnina / (Brazil) Thiago Monteiro (quarterfinals)
3. (United States) Connor Farren / (Portugal) Frederico Ferreira Silva (second round)
4. (Australia) Andrew Harris / (Australia) Nick Kyrgios (semifinals)
5. (Belgium) Kimmer Coppejans / (Finland) Herkko Pöllänen (second round)
6. (United Kingdom) Liam Broady / (United Kingdom) Joshua Ward-Hibbert (champions)
7. (Serbia) Peđa Krstin / (Canada) Filip Peliwo (quarterfinals)
8. (United Kingdom) Luke Bambridge / (United Kingdom) Kyle Edmund (first round)

== Draw ==
Key

- Q = Qualifier
- WC = Wild card
- LL = Lucky loser
- Alt = Alternate
- ITF = ITF entry
- PR = Protected ranking
- SR = Special ranking
- SE = Special exempt
- JE = Junior exempt
- JR = Junior Accelerator Programme entrant
- CO = College Accelerator Programme entrant
- NG = Next Gen Accelerator Program entrant
- w/o = Walkover
- r = Retired
- d = Defaulted

=== Finals ===
Semifinals
(Czech Republic) Adam Pavlásek (Croatia) Filip Veger	6	6
(France) Alexandre Favrot (France) Quentin Halys	4	2
4	(Australia) Andrew Harris (Australia) Nick Kyrgios	6	4	[6]
6	(United Kingdom) Liam Broady (United Kingdom) Joshua Ward-Hibbert	4	6	[10]

Final
(Czech Republic) Adam Pavlásek (Croatia) Filip Veger	3	2
6	(United Kingdom) Liam Broady (United Kingdom) Joshua Ward-Hibbert	6	6

=== Top half ===
First round
1	(Serbia) Nikola Milojević (Japan) Kaichi Uchida	6	4	[6]
(Germany) Kevin Kaczynski (Germany) Jannis Kahlke	4	6	[10]
WC	(Australia) Harry Bourchier (Australia) Bradley Mousley	3	1
(Czech Republic) Adam Pavlásek (Croatia) Filip Veger	6	6
(Japan) Ken Onishi (Japan) Takashi Saito	4	3
(Australia) Luke Saville (Australia) Jack Schipanski	6	6
(South Korea) Kim Jae-hwan (Germany) Daniel Masur	6^{6}	6	[7]
5	(Belgium) Kimmer Coppejans (Finland) Herkko Pöllänen	7^{8}	4	[10]
3	(United States) Connor Farren (Portugal) Frederico Ferreira Silva	6	4	[11]
WC	(Australia) Jay Andrijic (Australia) Jordan Thompson	4	6	[9]
(Italy) Matteo Donati (Italy) Stefano Napolitano	3	6^{3}
(France) Alexandre Favrot (France) Quentin Halys	6	7^{7}
(Slovakia) Patrik Fabian (Croatia) Franko Miočić	6	6
(Australia) Alexander Babanine (Australia) James Frawley	3	3
(Egypt) Karim Hossam (United States) Trey Strobel	6	7
8	(United Kingdom) Luke Bambridge (United Kingdom) Kyle Edmund	3	5

Second round
(Germany) K Kaczynski (Germany) J Kahlke	4	2
(Czech Republic) A Pavlásek (Croatia) F Veger	6	6
(Australia) L Saville (Australia) J Schipanski	6	0	[10]
5	(Belgium) K Coppejans (Finland) H Pöllänen	0	6	[4]
3	(United States) C Farren (Portugal) FF Silva	4	4
(France) A Favrot (France) Q Halys	6	6
(Slovakia) P Fabian (Croatia) F Miočić	6^{2}	6	[10]
(Egypt) K Hossam (United States) T Strobel	7^{7}	2	[6]

Quarterfinals
(Czech Republic) A Pavlásek (Croatia) F Veger	6	6
(Australia) L Saville (Australia) J Schipanski	4	4
(France) A Favrot (France) Q Halys	7^{7}	6
(Slovakia) P Fabian (Croatia) F Miočić	6^{4}	4

Semifinals
(Czech Republic) A Pavlásek (Croatia) F Veger	6	6
(France) A Favrot (France) Q Halys	4	2

=== Bottom half ===
First round
7	(Serbia) Peđa Krstin (Canada) Filip Peliwo	5	7^{7}	[10]
WC	(Australia) Jacob Grills (Australia) Daniel Guccione	7	6^{4}	[7]
(France) Mathias Bourgue (Brazil) Pedro Dumont	4	6	4
(Croatia) Borna Ćorić (Italy) Pietro Licciardi	6	3	[10]
(United States) Mackenzie McDonald (South Africa) Wayne Montgomery	7^{7}	1	[9]
(France) Laurent Lokoli (France) Lucas Pouille	6^{5}	6	[11]
(Chinese Taipei) Ho Chih-jen (Thailand) Wishaya Trongcharoenchaikul	3	1
4	(Australia) Andrew Harris (Australia) Nick Kyrgios	6	6
6	(United Kingdom) Liam Broady (United Kingdom) Joshua Ward-Hibbert	4	6	[10]
(Israel) Bar Tzuf Botzer (Israel) Or Ram-Harel	6	2	[7]
(Uzbekistan) Temur Ismailov (Greece) Markos Kalovelonis	7^{7}	6
(Sweden) Fred Simonsson (Denmark) Mikael Torpegaard	6^{2}	0
(Czech Republic) Marek Routa (Czech Republic) Robin Staněk	7^{7}	4	[10]
WC	(Australia) Thanasi Kokkinakis (Australia) Li Tu	6^{4}	6	[5]
(India) Arjun Kadhe (Romania) Ștefan Vinți	6^{6}	6	[7]
2	(Belgium) Julien Cagnina (Brazil) Thiago Monteiro	7^{8}	4	[10]

Second round
7	(Serbia) P Krstin (Canada) F Peliwo	2	6	[10]
(Croatia) B Ćorić (Italy) P Licciardi	6	2	[6]
(France) L Lokoli (France) L Pouille	2	6	[4]
4	(Australia) A Harris (Australia) N Kyrgios	6	4	[10]
6	(United Kingdom) L Broady (United Kingdom) J Ward-Hibbert	6	6
(Uzbekistan) T Ismailov (Greece) M Kalovelonis	2	2
(Czech Republic) M Routa (Czech Republic) R Staněk	6	4	[8]
2	(Belgium) J Cagnina (Brazil) T Monteiro	2	6	[10]

Quarterfinals
7	(Serbia) P Krstin (Canada) F Peliwo	4	7^{8}	[3]
4	(Australia) A Harris (Australia) N Kyrgios	6	6^{6}	[10]
6	(United Kingdom) L Broady (United Kingdom) J Ward-Hibbert	7^{7}	6
2	(Belgium) J Cagnina (Brazil) T Monteiro	6^{3}	3

Semifinals
4	(Australia) A Harris (Australia) N Kyrgios	6	4	[6]
6	(United Kingdom) L Broady (United Kingdom) J Ward-Hibbert	4	6	[10]
