= Filip Veger =

Croatian tennis player and coach

- Full name: Filip Veger
- Country (sports): Croatia
- Residence: Slatina, Croatia
- Born: 21 December 1994 (age 30) Slatina, Croatia
- Plays: Right-handed (two handed-backhand)
- Prize money: $47,011

Singles
- Career record: 0–1 (at ATP Tour level, Grand Slam level, and in Davis Cup)
- Career titles: 0
- Highest ranking: No. 478 (16 February 2015)

Doubles
- Career titles: 0
- Highest ranking: No. 557 (21 April 2014)
- Current ranking: No. 2279 (31 May 2021)
- Last updated on: 12 June 2021.

Filip Veger (born 21 December 1994, in Slatina) is a Croatian tennis coach and former professional tennis player.

== Career ==
Veger made his ATP main draw debut at the 2013 PBZ Zagreb Indoors where he came through qualifying defeating Simon Greul, Kamil Čapkovič and Ante Pavić. He lost in the first round to Lukáš Rosol, 6–2, 6–4.

As a singles player, Veger reached a career high of 478 in February 2015. He had some success as a junior, reaching a highest ranking of 52 in singles and was also a finalist in the 2012 Australian Open Boys' Doubles alongside Adam Pavlásek, losing to the British pair of Liam Broady and Joshua Ward-Hibbert.

== Personal ==
Veger studied at Durham University from 2017 to 2018, also playing for and coaching the men's tennis team. He was the 2018 BUCS singles champion.

He currently coaches with the Qatar Tennis Federation.

== Junior Grand Slam finals ==
=== Doubles: 1 (1 runner-up) ===
Result	Year	Tournament	Surface	Partner	Opponent	Score
Loss	2012	Australian Open	Hard	(Czech Republic) Adam Pavlásek	(United Kingdom) Liam Broady (United Kingdom) Joshua Ward-Hibbert	3–6, 2–6

== ATP Challenger and ITF Futures finals ==
=== Singles: 4 (0–4) ===
Legend ATP Challenger (0–0) ITF Futures (0–4)	Finals by surface Hard (0–1) Clay (0–1) Grass (0–0) Carpet (0–2)

Result	W–L	Date	Tournament	Tier	Surface	Opponent	Score
Loss	0-1	Feb 2014	Croatia F3, Zagreb	Futures	Hard	(United Kingdom) Kyle Edmund	2-6, 5–7
Loss	0-2	Nov 2015	Czech Republic F7, Jablonec nad Nisou	Futures	Carpet	(Czech Republic) Jan Mertl	2-6, 4–6
Loss	0-3	Jan 2016	Czech Republic F7, Jablonec nad Nisou	Futures	Carpet	(Germany) Mats Moraing	1–6, 6–7^{(6–8)}
Loss	0-4	Sep 2016	Serbia F8, Sokobanja	Futures	Clay	(Bulgaria) Alexandar Lazarov	7–6^{(7–2)}, 6–7^{(4–7)}, 0–3 ret.

=== Doubles: 4 (2–2) ===
Legend ATP Challenger (0–0) ITF Futures (2–2)	Finals by surface Hard (2–1) Clay (0–1) Grass (0–0) Carpet (0–0)

Result	W–L	Date	Tournament	Tier	Surface	Partner	Opponents	Score
Loss	0-1	Jun 2013	Bosnia & Herzegovina F4, Kiseljak	Futures	Clay	(Croatia) Lovro Zovko	(Croatia) Tomislav Draganja (Croatia) Mate Delić	4–6, 3–6
Win	1-1	Mar 2014	Ukraine F1, Cherkassy	Futures	Hard	(Ukraine) Vladyslav Manafov	(Latvia) Janis Podzus (Latvia) Mārtiņš Podžus	6-2, 7–5
Loss	1-2	Mar 2014	Ukraine F2, Cherkassy	Futures	Hard	(Ukraine) Vladyslav Manafov	(Ukraine) Volodymyr Uzhylovskyi (Ukraine) Artem Smirnov	4-6, 3–6
Win	2-2	Mar 2014	Ukraine F3, Cherkassy	Futures	Hard	(Ukraine) Vladyslav Manafov	(Ukraine) Marat Deviatiarov (Germany) Pirmin Haenle	6-2, 6–3
