= Joshua Ward-Hibbert =

British tennis and basketball player

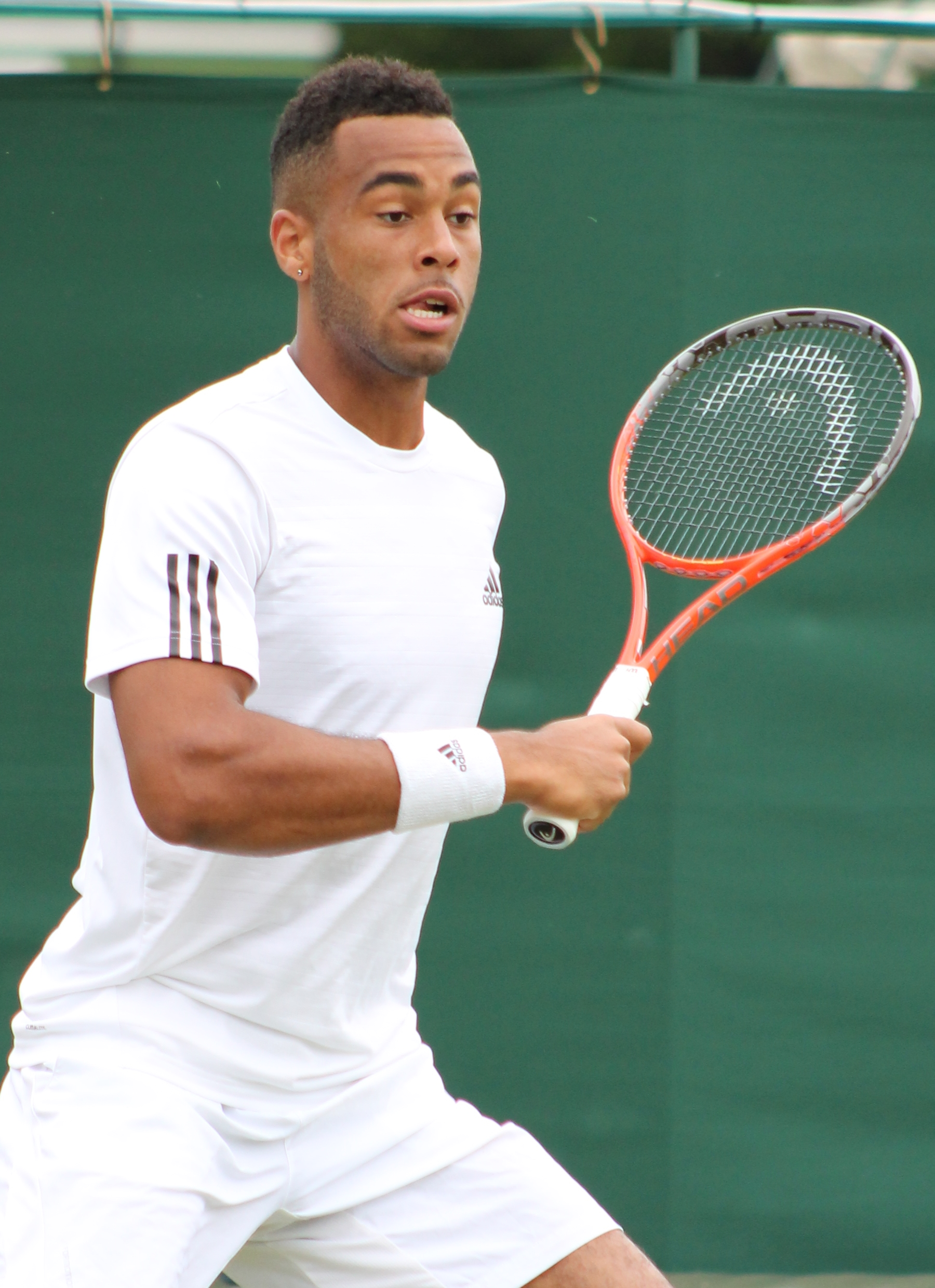
- Ward-Hibbert at the 2014 Wimbledon Championships
- Born: Joshua Thomas Ward-Hibbert; 25 January 1994 (age 32); Mansfield, England
- Occupations: Tennis player, basketball player
- Height: 1.96 m (6 ft 5 in)
- Basketball career

No. 2 – Newcastle Eagles
- Position: Guard / forward
- League: BBL

Career information
- Playing career: 2008–present

Career history
- 2008–2009; 2011–2012; 2016: Derby Trailblazers
- 2016–2020: Leicester Riders
- 2020–2023: London Lions
- 2023-Present: Newcastle Eagles
- Tennis career
- Country (sports): United Kingdom
- Plays: Right-handed (one-handed backhand)
- Prize money: $38,290

Singles
- Career record: 0–0
- Career titles: 0
- Highest ranking: No. 588 (16 February 2015)

Grand Slam singles results
- Wimbledon: Q1 (2014)

Doubles
- Career record: 0–0
- Career titles: 0
- Highest ranking: No. 305 (18 November 2013)

Joshua Thomas Ward-Hibbert (born 25 January 1994) is a British basketball player for the Newcastle Eagles of the Super League Basketball.

== Personal ==
Ward-Hibbert's infant and junior school was Dagfa House School a small independent school in Nottingham. Ward-Hibbert was an accomplished basketball player as a teenager, playing for the England under-16 team. In 2010, he was named the England under-16 boys' player of the year by England Basketball after being named to the All-Tournament team at the Division B European Championships.

== Career ==
=== Tennis ===
Best known for his former occupation as a tennis player. Ward-Hibbert holds the record for the fastest serve by a junior player at Wimbledon after clocking a 133 mph serve at the 2011 Wimbledon Championships. Ward-Hibbert, along with Liam Broady, won the 2012 Australian Open Boys' doubles title after defeating Adam Pavlasek and Filip Veger 6–3, 6–2 in 2012.

=== Basketball ===
In 2016, while studying at Loughborough University, Ward-Hibbert switched his attention from tennis to basketball, initially playing for the Derby Trailblazers. He transferred to the British Basketball League (BBL) club Leicester Riders during the 2016–17 BBL season.

On 13 August 2020, Ward-Hibbert signed with the London Lions for the 2020–21 BBL season.

== Tennis career ==
=== Juniors ===
Junior Slam results – Singles:

Australian Open: QF (2012)
French Open: 1R (2012)
Wimbledon: 2R (2011)
US Open: 2R (2012)

Junior Slam results – Doubles:

Australian Open: W (2012)
French Open: QF (2012)
Wimbledon: QF (2011)
US Open: QF (2012)

== ATP Challengers and ITF Futures finals ==
=== Singles: 1 (1–0) ===
Legend ATP Challengers (0–0) ITF Futures (1–0)	Finals by surface Hard (1–0) Clay (0–0) Grass (0–0) Carpet (0–0)

Result	W–L	Date	Tournament	Tier	Surface	Opponent	Score
Win	1–0	Dec 2014	Tunisia F11, Sousse	Futures	Hard	(Japan) Hiroyasu Ehara	6–2, 3–6, 6–4

=== Doubles: 27 (13–14) ===
Legend ATP Challengers (0–0) ITF Futures (13–14)	Finals by surface Hard (12–10) Clay (1–2) Grass (0–2) Carpet (0–0)

Result	W–L	Date	Tournament	Tier	Surface	Partner	Opponents	Score
Win	1–0	Apr 2013	Vietnam F2, Ho Chi Minh City	Futures	Hard	(United Kingdom) Andrew Fitzpatrick	(Cambodia) Bun Kenny (South Korea) Jae Hwan Kim	6–4, 6–2
Win	2–0	Apr 2013	Vietnam F3, Ho Chi Minh City	Futures	Hard	(United Kingdom) Andrew Fitzpatrick	(New Zealand) Logan MacKenzie (Australia) Dane Propoggia	4–6, 7–6^{(9–7)}, [11–9]
Win	3–0	May 2013	Egypt F8, Sharm El Sheikh	Futures	Clay	(United Kingdom) Liam Broady	(Italy) Marco Crugnola (Italy) Riccardo Sinicropi	6–3, 7–5
Loss	3–1	Jun 2013	Egypt F9, Sharm El Sheikh	Futures	Clay	(United Kingdom) Liam Broady	(Belgium) Joris De Loore (Belgium) Jeroen Vanneste	2–6, 2–6
Win	4–1	Aug 2013	Great Britain F15, Nottingham	Futures	Hard	(United Kingdom) Liam Broady	(United Kingdom) Scott Clayton (United Kingdom) Toby Martin	4–6, 6–3, [10–6]
Win	5–1	Aug 2013	Great Britain F16, Chiswick	Futures	Hard	(United Kingdom) Liam Broady	(United Kingdom) David Rice (United Kingdom) Sean Thornley	7–6^{(7–5)}, 2–6, [10–6]
Loss	5–2	Aug 2013	Great Britain F17, Wrexham	Futures	Hard	(United Kingdom) Liam Broady	(United Kingdom) George Coupland (United Kingdom) Marcus Willis	6–7^{(6–8)}, 3–6
Loss	5–3	Sep 2013	Great Britain F19, Roehampton	Futures	Hard	(United Kingdom) Edward Corrie	(United Kingdom) Lewis Burton (United Kingdom) Marcus Willis	6–4, 4–6, [8–10]
Win	6–3	Oct 2013	Israel F13, Akko	Futures	Hard	(United Kingdom) Liam Broady	(Slovakia) Ivo Klec (Czech Republic) Michal Schmid	6–3, 6–0
Loss	6–4	Oct 2013	Israel F14, Ramat HaSharon	Futures	Hard	(United Kingdom) Liam Broady	(United Kingdom) Luke Bambridge (United Kingdom) Evan Hoyt	6–7^{(5–7)}, 6–7^{(4–7)}
Loss	6–5	Jan 2014	Great Britain F2, Sunderland	Futures	Hard (i)	(United Kingdom) Richard Gabb	(United Kingdom) David Rice (United Kingdom) Sean Thornley	3–6, 3–6
Loss	6–6	Mar 2014	Great Britain F7, Preston	Futures	Hard (i)	(Denmark) Frederik Nielsen	(United Kingdom) Luke Bambridge (United Kingdom) Liam Broady	4–6, 4–6
Loss	6–7	Mar 2014	Bahrain F1, Manama	Futures	Hard	(United Kingdom) Liam Broady	(Spain) Jaime Pulgar-Garcia (Spain) Javier Pulgar-Garcia	2–6, 6–2, [6–10]
Win	7–7	Apr 2014	Qatar F4, Doha	Futures	Hard	(United Kingdom) Liam Broady	(Italy) Lorenzo Frigerio (Italy) Luca Vanni	6–3, 7–5
Loss	7–8	Apr 2014	Qatar F3, Doha	Futures	Hard	(United Kingdom) Oliver Golding	(Chinese Taipei) Chen Ti (South Africa) Ruan Roelofse	1–6, 1–6
Loss	7–9	Jul 2014	Great Britain F12, Manchester	Futures	Grass	(United Kingdom) Edward Corrie	(United Kingdom) Oliver Golding (United Kingdom) George Morgan	6–7^{(4–7)}, 6–4, [6–10]
Loss	7–10	Jul 2014	Great Britain F13, Ilkley	Futures	Grass	(United Kingdom) Brydan Klein	(United Kingdom) Lewis Burton (United Kingdom) Edward Corrie	2–6, 4–6
Win	8–10	Sep 2014	Great Britain F15, London	Futures	Hard	(Denmark) Frederik Nielsen	(Republic of Ireland) David O'Hare (United Kingdom) Joe Salisbury	6–7^{(5–7)}, 6–4, [10–8]
Win	9–10	Sep 2014	Portugal F7, Castelo Branco	Futures	Hard	(United Kingdom) Luke Bambridge	(Spain) Iván Arenas Gualda (Spain) Jaime Pulgar García	7–6^{(7–0)}, 6–4
Loss	9–11	Apr 2015	Greece F4, Heraklion	Futures	Hard	(United Kingdom) Joe Salisbury	(Greece) Alexandros Jakupovic (Greece) Markos Kalovelonis	1–6, 2–6
Win	10–11	Sep 2015	Great Britain F9, Nottingham	Futures	Hard	(United Kingdom) Lloyd Glasspool	(United Kingdom) Daniel Cox (United Kingdom) David Rice	6–4, 3–6, [10–7]
Loss	10–12	Sep 2015	Spain F30, Sevilla	Futures	Clay	(United Kingdom) Lloyd Glasspool	(Italy) Marco Bortolotti (Spain) Juan Lizariturry	3–6, 4–6
Win	11–12	Oct 2015	Greece F7, Heraklion	Futures	Hard	(United Kingdom) Lloyd Glasspool	(Republic of Ireland) Peter Bothwell (United Kingdom) Toby Martin	6–3, 7–5
Win	12–12	Oct 2015	Greece F8, Heraklion	Futures	Hard	(United Kingdom) Lloyd Glasspool	(France) Corentin Denolly (France) Alexandre Müller	Walkover
Loss	12–13	Nov 2015	Great Britain F10, Tipton	Futures	Hard (i)	(United Kingdom) Lloyd Glasspool	(United Kingdom) Billy Harris (United Kingdom) Evan Hoyt	6–4, 3–6, [9–11]
Win	13–13	Nov 2015	Great Britain F11, Bath	Futures	Hard (i)	(United Kingdom) Lloyd Glasspool	(Republic of Ireland) Sam Barry (Canada) Filip Peliwo	6–4, 3–6, [10–2]
Loss	13–14	Feb 2016	Great Britain F2, Sunderland	Futures	Hard (i)	(United Kingdom) Lloyd Glasspool	(Italy) Andrea Vavassori (Germany) George Von Massow	5–7, 3–6
