= 2012 Australian Open – Women's doubles =

Women's doubles
- 2012 Australian Open

Final
- Champion: (Russia) Svetlana Kuznetsova (Russia) Vera Zvonareva
- Runner-up: (Italy) Sara Errani (Italy) Roberta Vinci
- Score: 5–7, 6–4, 6–3

Details
- Draw: 64
- Seeds: 16

Events
Singles	men	women		boys	girls
Doubles	men	women	mixed	boys	girls
WC Singles	men	women	quad
WC Doubles	men	women	quad
Legends	men	women	mixed
- Australian Open

Svetlana Kuznetsova and Vera Zvonareva defeated Sara Errani and Roberta Vinci in the final, 5–7, 6–4, 6–3 to win the women's doubles tennis title at the 2012 Australian Open.

Gisela Dulko and Flavia Pennetta were the defending champions, but lost to Kuznetsova and Zvonareva in the third round.

== Seeds ==
1. (Czech Republic) Květa Peschke / (Slovenia) Katarina Srebotnik (second round, retired)
2. (United States) Liezel Huber / (United States) Lisa Raymond (quarterfinals)
3. (United States) Vania King / (Kazakhstan) Yaroslava Shvedova (quarterfinals)
4. (Argentina) Gisela Dulko / (Italy) Flavia Pennetta (third round)
5. (Russia) Maria Kirilenko / (Russia) Nadia Petrova (third round, retired)
6. (India) Sania Mirza / (Russia) Elena Vesnina (semifinals)
7. (Czech Republic) Andrea Hlaváčková / (Czech Republic) Lucie Hradecká (semifinals)
8. (Slovakia) Daniela Hantuchová / (Poland) Agnieszka Radwańska (third round)
9. (South Africa) Natalie Grandin / (Czech Republic) Vladimíra Uhlířová (second round)
10. (Czech Republic) Iveta Benešová / (Czech Republic) Barbora Záhlavová-Strýcová (second round)
11. (Italy) Sara Errani / (Italy) Roberta Vinci (final)
12. (Australia) Jarmila Gajdošová / (United States) Bethanie Mattek-Sands (third round)
13. (Spain) Nuria Llagostera Vives / (Spain) Arantxa Parra Santonja (second round)
14. (Chinese Taipei) Hsieh Su-wei / (Kazakhstan) Galina Voskoboeva (second round)
15. (United States) Raquel Kops-Jones / (United States) Abigail Spears (first round)
16. (Russia) Vera Dushevina / (Israel) Shahar Pe'er (second round)

== Draw ==
Key

- Q = Qualifier
- WC = Wild card
- LL = Lucky loser
- Alt = Alternate
- ITF = ITF entry
- PR = Protected ranking
- SR = Special ranking
- SE = Special exempt
- JE = Junior exempt
- JR = Junior Accelerator Programme entrant
- CO = College Accelerator Programme entrant
- NG = Next Gen Accelerator Program entrant
- w/o = Walkover
- r = Retired
- d = Defaulted

=== Finals ===
Quarterfinals
(Russia) Alla Kudryavtseva (Russia) Ekaterina Makarova	3	1
11	(Italy) Sara Errani (Italy) Roberta Vinci	6	6
3	(United States) Vania King (Kazakhstan) Yaroslava Shvedova	5	2
7	(Czech Republic) Andrea Hlaváčková (Czech Republic) Lucie Hradecká	7	6
(Romania) Irina-Camelia Begu (Romania) Monica Niculescu	5	3
(Russia) Svetlana Kuznetsova (Russia) Vera Zvonareva	7	6
6	(India) Sania Mirza (Russia) Elena Vesnina	6	5	7^{8}
2	(United States) Liezel Huber (United States) Lisa Raymond	3	7	6^{6}

Semifinals
11	(Italy) Sara Errani (Italy) Roberta Vinci	5	7	6
7	(Czech Republic) Andrea Hlaváčková (Czech Republic) Lucie Hradecká	7	5	1
(Russia) Svetlana Kuznetsova (Russia) Vera Zvonareva	7^{7}	2	6
6	(India) Sania Mirza (Russia) Elena Vesnina	6^{4}	6	4

Final
11	(Italy) Sara Errani (Italy) Roberta Vinci	7	4	3
(Russia) Svetlana Kuznetsova (Russia) Vera Zvonareva	5	6	6

=== Top half ===
==== Section 1 ====
First round
1	(Czech Republic) K Peschke (Slovenia) K Srebotnik	2	6	6
(Germany) A Kerber (United States) C McHale	6	2	2
(Serbia) B Jovanovski (Netherlands) M Krajicek	6^{1}	6	3
(Russia) A Kudryavtseva (Russia) E Makarova	7^{7}	4	6
(Slovenia) P Hercog (China) J Zheng	6	6
(France) M Johansson (France) P Parmentier	2	2
(Sweden) S Arvidsson (Sweden) J Larsson	5	3
16	(Russia) V Dushevina (Israel) S Pe'er	7	6
11	(Italy) S Errani (Italy) R Vinci	6	6
WC	(Australia) T Patterson (Australia) S Sanders	0	0
(Australia) An Rodionova (Australia) Ar Rodionova	6	6
WC	(Australia) S Peers (Australia) I Holland	2	1
(China) S Peng (Italy) F Schiavone	6	2^{r}
(Austria) T Paszek (Germany) J Wöhr	3	5
(Georgia (country)) A Tatishvili (Belarus) A Yakimova	1	0
8	(Slovakia) D Hantuchová (Poland) A Radwańska	6	6

Second round
1	(Czech Republic) K Peschke (Slovenia) K Srebotnik	2^{r}
(Russia) A Kudryavtseva (Russia) E Makarova	3
(Slovenia) P Hercog (China) J Zheng	6	6
16	(Russia) V Dushevina (Israel) S Pe'er	2	2
11	(Italy) S Errani (Italy) R Vinci	4	6	6
(Australia) An Rodionova (Australia) Ar Rodionova	6	4	3
(Austria) T Paszek (Germany) J Wöhr	0	0
8	(Slovakia) D Hantuchová (Poland) A Radwańska	6	6

Third round
(Russia) A Kudryavtseva (Russia) E Makarova	7	6
(Slovenia) P Hercog (China) J Zheng	5	4
11	(Italy) S Errani (Italy) R Vinci	6	6
8	(Slovakia) D Hantuchová (Poland) A Radwańska	4	2

Quarterfinals
(Russia) A Kudryavtseva (Russia) E Makarova	3	1
11	(Italy) S Errani (Italy) R Vinci	6	6

==== Section 2 ====
First round
3	(United States) V King (Kazakhstan) Y Shvedova	1	6	6
(Germany) K Barrois (Germany) A-L Grönefeld	6	3	1
Alt	(Latvia) L Dekmeijere (Russia) M Kondratieva	4	1
WC	(Australia) S Jones (Australia) B Bobusic	6	6
(Germany) M Barthel (United Kingdom) A Keothavong	4	7^{7}	5
(Croatia) P Martić (France) K Mladenovic	6	6^{3}	7
(Japan) K Date-Krumm (China) S Zhang	2	1
14	(Chinese Taipei) S-w Hsieh (Kazakhstan) G Voskoboeva	6	6
10	(Czech Republic) I Benešová (Czech Republic) B Záhlavová-Strýcová	6	6
(Uzbekistan) A Amanmuradova (Ukraine) M Koryttseva	4	1
(Kazakhstan) K Pervak (United States) S Stephens	6^{4}	4
(Japan) R Fujiwara (Japan) A Morita	7^{7}	6
(Czech Republic) P Cetkovská (France) S Foretz Gacon	6	6
WC	(Australia) M Adamczak (Australia) O Rogowska	4	3
(Slovakia) M Rybáriková (Czech Republic) K Zakopalová	2	5
7	(Czech Republic) A Hlaváčková (Czech Republic) L Hradecká	6	7

Second round
3	(United States) V King (Kazakhstan) Y Shvedova	6	6
WC	(Australia) S Jones (Australia) B Bobusic	1	0
(Croatia) P Martić (France) K Mladenovic	6^{1}	7	6
14	(Chinese Taipei) S-w Hsieh (Kazakhstan) G Voskoboeva	7^{7}	5	3
10	(Czech Republic) I Benešová (Czech Republic) B Záhlavová-Strýcová	4	6	5
(Japan) R Fujiwara (Japan) A Morita	6	3	7
(Czech Republic) P Cetkovská (France) S Foretz Gacon	5	3
7	(Czech Republic) A Hlaváčková (Czech Republic) L Hradecká	7	6

Third round
3	(United States) V King (Kazakhstan) Y Shvedova	6	2	6
(Croatia) P Martić (France) K Mladenovic	2	6	2
(Japan) R Fujiwara (Japan) A Morita	3	6	2
7	(Czech Republic) A Hlaváčková (Czech Republic) L Hradecká	6	3	6

Quarterfinals
3	(United States) V King (Kazakhstan) Y Shvedova	5	2
7	(Czech Republic) A Hlaváčková (Czech Republic) L Hradecká	7	6

=== Bottom half ===
==== Section 3 ====
First round
5	(Russia) M Kirilenko (Russia) N Petrova	6	4	6
(Thailand) T Tanasugarn (Spain) L Domínguez Lino	2	6	1
(Poland) K Jans-Ignacik (Poland) U Radwańska	6	7
WC	(Australia) D Jeflea (Australia) V Rajicic	4	5
(Romania) S Halep (Netherlands) A Rus	4	4
(Romania) I-C Begu (Romania) M Niculescu	6	6
(Romania) S Cîrstea (Czech Republic) L Šafářová	6	4	4
9	(South Africa) N Grandin (Czech Republic) V Uhlířová	2	6	6
15	(United States) R Kops-Jones (United States) A Spears	1	6	3
(Germany) J Görges (Estonia) K Kanepi	6	4	6
(Russia) S Kuznetsova (Russia) V Zvonareva	7^{7}	6
(France) A Cornet (Belarus) O Govortsova	6^{4}	4
(Spain) S Soler-Espinosa (Spain) C Suárez Navarro	6	7^{7}
(Chinese Taipei) C-j Chuang (New Zealand) M Erakovic	3	6^{2}
(United States) I Falconi (Canada) R Marino	6	4	4
4	(Argentina) G Dulko (Italy) F Pennetta	3	6	6

Second round
5	(Russia) M Kirilenko (Russia) N Petrova	6	6
(Poland) K Jans-Ignacik (Poland) U Radwańska	1	1
(Romania) I-C Begu (Romania) M Niculescu	6	4	6
9	(South Africa) N Grandin (Czech Republic) V Uhlířová	1	6	3
(Germany) J Görges (Estonia) K Kanepi	0	3
(Russia) S Kuznetsova (Russia) V Zvonareva	6	6
(Spain) S Soler-Espinosa (Spain) C Suárez Navarro	2	2
4	(Argentina) G Dulko (Italy) F Pennetta	6	6

Third round
5	(Russia) M Kirilenko (Russia) N Petrova	0^{r}
(Romania) I-C Begu (Romania) M Niculescu	3
(Russia) S Kuznetsova (Russia) V Zvonareva	3	6	7^{7}
4	(Argentina) G Dulko (Italy) F Pennetta	6	3	6^{4}

Quarterfinals
(Romania) I-C Begu (Romania) M Niculescu	5	3
(Russia) S Kuznetsova (Russia) V Zvonareva	7	6

==== Section 4 ====
First round
6	(India) S Mirza (Russia) E Vesnina	6	6
(Greece) E Daniilidou (Russia) A Panova	0	2
(Czech Republic) E Birnerová (Italy) A Brianti	6	6
WC	(Australia) S Bengson (Australia) T Calderwood	4	4
WC	(Australia) A Barty (United Kingdom) L Robson	6	2	3
(Slovakia) D Cibulková (United States) J Craybas	3	6	6
(Russia) N Bratchikova (Croatia) D Jurak	6	3	2
12	(Australia) J Gajdošová (United States) B Mattek-Sands	4	6	6
13	(Spain) N Llagostera Vives (Spain) A Parra Santonja	2	6	6
(Australia) C Dellacqua (South Africa) C Scheepers	6	4	4
(Slovenia) A Klepač (Poland) A Rosolska	7^{8}	7
(Ukraine) K Bondarenko (Australia) J Dokić	6^{6}	5
(Romania) A Dulgheru (France) V Razzano	6	6
(Hungary) G Arn (Ukraine) O Savchuk	4	0
(Spain) A Medina Garrigues (Russia) A Pavlyuchenkova	3	1
2	(United States) L Huber (United States) L Raymond	6	6

Second round
6	(India) S Mirza (Russia) E Vesnina	7	7
(Czech Republic) E Birnerová (Italy) A Brianti	5	5
(Slovakia) D Cibulková (United States) J Craybas	7	3	3
12	(Australia) J Gajdošová (United States) B Mattek-Sands	5	6	6
13	(Spain) N Llagostera Vives (Spain) A Parra Santonja	5	4
(Slovenia) A Klepač (Poland) A Rosolska	7	6
(Romania) A Dulgheru (France) V Razzano	0	0
2	(United States) L Huber (United States) L Raymond	6	6

Third round
6	(India) S Mirza (Russia) E Vesnina	7	6
12	(Australia) J Gajdošová (United States) B Mattek-Sands	5	3
(Slovenia) A Klepač (Poland) A Rosolska	2	1
2	(United States) L Huber (United States) L Raymond	6	6

Quarterfinals
6	(India) S Mirza (Russia) E Vesnina	6	5	7^{8}
2	(United States) L Huber (United States) L Raymond	3	7	6^{6}
