= 2012 Australian Open – Girls' singles =

Girls' singles
- 2012 Australian Open

Final
- Champion: (United States) Taylor Townsend
- Runner-up: (Russia) Yulia Putintseva
- Score: 6–1, 3–6, 6–3

Events
Singles	men	women		boys	girls
Doubles	men	women	mixed	boys	girls
WC Singles	men	women	quad
WC Doubles	men	women	quad
Legends	men	women	mixed
- Australian Open

Taylor Townsend won the title, defeating Yulia Putintseva in the final, 6–1, 3–6, 6–3.

An-Sophie Mestach was the defending champion, but withdrew before the tournament began.

== Seeds ==
1. (Russia) Irina Khromacheva (quarterfinals)
2. (Canada) Eugenie Bouchard (semifinals)
3. (Estonia) Anett Kontaveit (third round)
4. (Russia) Yulia Putintseva (final)
5. (Netherlands) Indy de Vroome (second round, retired)
6. (Russia) Elizaveta Kulichkova (first round)
7. (Montenegro) Danka Kovinić (first round)
8. (Slovakia) Anna Karolína Schmiedlová (third round)
9. (China) Zheng Saisai (second round)
10. (Romania) Ilka Csöregi (second round)
11. (Poland) Zuzanna Maciejewska (first round)
12. (Uzbekistan) Sabina Sharipova (quarterfinals)
13. (Croatia) Donna Vekić (first round)
14. (United States) Taylor Townsend (champion)
15. (Russia) Varvara Flink (first round)
16. (United States) Kyle McPhillips (third round)

== Draw ==
Key

- Q = Qualifier
- WC = Wild card
- LL = Lucky loser
- Alt = Alternate
- ITF = ITF entry
- PR = Protected ranking
- SR = Special ranking
- SE = Special exempt
- JE = Junior exempt
- JR = Junior Accelerator Programme entrant
- CO = College Accelerator Programme entrant
- NG = Next Gen Accelerator Program entrant
- w/o = Walkover
- r = Retired
- d = Defaulted

=== Finals ===
Quarterfinals
1	(Russia) Irina Khromacheva	3	3
SE	(United States) Krista Hardebeck	6	6
14	(United States) Taylor Townsend	6	2	6
12	(Uzbekistan) Sabina Sharipova	3	6	4
(Czech Republic) Barbora Krejčíková	2	3
4	(Russia) Yulia Putintseva	6	6
(Japan) Risa Ozaki	4	3
2	(Canada) Eugenie Bouchard	6	6

Semifinals
SE	(United States) Krista Hardebeck	6^{3}	4
14	(United States) Taylor Townsend	7^{7}	6
4	(Russia) Yulia Putintseva	7	6
2	(Canada) Eugenie Bouchard	5	1

Final
14	(United States) Taylor Townsend	6	3	6
4	(Russia) Yulia Putintseva	1	6	3

=== Top half ===
==== Section 1 ====
First round
1	(Russia) Irina Khromacheva	6	6
WC	(Australia) Naiktha Bains	3	2
(United States) Stephanie Nauta	6	2	7
(Indonesia) Aldila Sutjiadi	4	6	5
WC	(Australia) Storm Sanders	7	6
(Liechtenstein) Kathinka von Deichmann	5	4
Q	(United States) Julia Elbaba	6	6
13	(Croatia) Donna Vekić	4	1
9	(China) Zheng Saisai	6	6
SE	(Japan) Riko Sawayanagi	4	1
SE	(United States) Krista Hardebeck	6	6
(Czech Republic) Petra Rohanová	1	2
WC	(Australia) Brooke Rischbieth	2	1
(Canada) Carol Zhao	6	6
(New Zealand) Emily Fanning	5	1
8	(Slovakia) Anna Karolína Schmiedlová	7	6

Second round
1	(Russia) I Khromacheva	6	6
(United States) S Nauta	1	2
WC	(Australia) S Sanders	6	6
Q	(United States) J Elbaba	3	4
9	(China) S Zheng	1	3
SE	(United States) K Hardebeck	6	6
(Canada) C Zhao	6	5	2
8	(Slovakia) AK Schmiedlová	4	7	6

Third round
1	(Russia) I Khromacheva	6	6
WC	(Australia) S Sanders	4	1
SE	(United States) K Hardebeck	6	6
8	(Slovakia) AK Schmiedlová	1	2

Quarterfinal
1	(Russia) I Khromacheva	3	3
SE	(United States) K Hardebeck	6	6

==== Section 2 ====
First round
3	(Estonia) Anett Kontaveit	6	6
(Japan) Miho Kowase	1	0
(Brazil) Beatriz Haddad Maia	3	2
(South Korea) Lee So-ra	6	6
(Australia) Abbie Myers	6	3	5
Q	(Romania) Ioana Loredana Roșca	4	6	7
(India) Ratnika Batra	1	2
14	(United States) Taylor Townsend	6	6
12	(Uzbekistan) Sabina Sharipova	6	2	6
(Czech Republic) Jesika Malečková	0	6	4
WC	(Australia) Georgiana Ruhrig	7^{7}	0	6
Q	(Israel) Valeria Patiuk	6^{4}	6	4
(United States) Samantha Crawford	6	4	6
(Japan) Makoto Ninomiya	3	6	4
(France) Jade Suvrijn	7	6
6	(Russia) Elizaveta Kulichkova	5	1

Second round
3	(Estonia) A Kontaveit	6	6^{6}	8
(South Korea) S-r Lee	1	7^{8}	6
Q	(Romania) IL Roșca	1	1
14	(United States) T Townsend	6	6
12	(Uzbekistan) S Sharipova	6	6
WC	(Australia) G Ruhrig	0	2
(United States) S Crawford	7	7
(France) J Suvrijn	5	5

Third round
3	(Estonia) A Kontaveit	4	4
14	(United States) T Townsend	6	6
12	(Uzbekistan) S Sharipova	7	6
(United States) S Crawford	5	1

Quarterfinal
14	(United States) T Townsend	6	2	6
12	(Uzbekistan) S Sharipova	3	6	4

=== Bottom half ===
==== Section 3 ====
First round
5	(Netherlands) Indy de Vroome	6	6	6
Q	(Japan) Eri Hozumi	4	7^{7}	1
Q	(Italy) Camilla Rosatello	6^{0}	6	7
Q	(Australia) Zoe Hives	7^{7}	3	5
(United States) Sachia Vickery	2	3
(Czech Republic) Barbora Krejčíková	6	6
WC	(Australia) Priscilla Hon	6	6^{5}	3
10	(Romania) Ilka Csöregi	3	7^{7}	6
16	(United States) Kyle McPhillips	6	6
Q	(Switzerland) Mégane Bianco	3	2
(South Korea) Jang Su-jeong	6	6^{4}	3
(Latvia) Jeļena Ostapenko	2	7^{7}	6
(Japan) Nao Hibino	6	6
WC	(Australia) Belinda Woolcock	2	2
Q	(United States) Catherine Harrison	2	2
4	(Russia) Yulia Putintseva	6	6

Second round
5	(Netherlands) I de Vroome	4	6	1^{r}
Q	(Italy) C Rosatello	6	1	4
(Czech Republic) B Krejčíková	7^{7}	6
10	(Romania) I Csöregi	6^{4}	1
16	(United States) K McPhillips	6	6
(Latvia) J Ostapenko	2	3
(Japan) N Hibino	2	1
4	(Russia) Y Putintseva	6	6

Third round
Q	(Italy) C Rosatello	2	3
(Czech Republic) B Krejčíková	6	6
16	(United States) K McPhillips	7	1	5
4	(Russia) Y Putintseva	5	6	7

Quarterfinal
(Czech Republic) B Krejčíková	2	3
4	(Russia) Y Putintseva	6	6

==== Section 4 ====
First round
7	(Montenegro) Danka Kovinić	2	6	1
(Kazakhstan) Anna Danilina	6	1	6
WC	(Australia) Eliza Long	6	4	0
(Japan) Risa Ozaki	4	6	6
(United States) Gabrielle Andrews	7	6^{6}	4
(Russia) Olga Doroshina	5	7^{8}	6
(Romania) Elena-Theodora Cadar	7	0	7
11	(Poland) Zuzanna Maciejewska	5	6	5
15	(Russia) Varvara Flink	6^{3}	3
(Sweden) Ellen Allgurin	7^{7}	6
(United States) Christina Makarova	6	6
WC	(Australia) Sara Tomic	2	2
(Croatia) Iva Mekovec	3	6	6
(India) Rutuja Bhosale	6	4	2
(Japan) Miyu Kato	2	4
2	(Canada) Eugenie Bouchard	6	6

Second round
(Kazakhstan) A Danilina	1	4
(Japan) R Ozaki	6	6
(Russia) O Doroshina	4	4
(Romania) E-T Cadar	6	6
(Sweden) E Allgurin	2	1
(United States) C Makarova	6	6
(Croatia) I Mekovec	3	6	3
2	(Canada) E Bouchard	6	3	6

Third round
(Japan) R Ozaki	6	6
(Romania) E-T Cadar	2	2
(United States) C Makarova	5	5
2	(Canada) E Bouchard	7	7

Quarterfinal
(Japan) R Ozaki	4	3
2	(Canada) E Bouchard	6	6
