= 2012 Australian Open – Wheelchair quad doubles =

Wheelchair quad doubles
- 2012 Australian Open

Final
- Champions: (United Kingdom) Andrew Lapthorne (United Kingdom) Peter Norfolk
- Runners-up: (United States) David Wagner (Israel) Noam Gershony
- Score: 6–4, 6–2

Events
Singles	men	women		boys	girls
Doubles	men	women	mixed	boys	girls
WC Singles	men	women	quad
WC Doubles	men	women	quad
Legends	men	women	mixed
- Australian Open

Defending champions Andrew Lapthorne and Peter Norfolk defeated David Wagner and Noam Gershony in the final, 6–4, 6–2 to win the quad doubles wheelchair tennis title at the 2012 Australian Open.

== Seeds ==
1. (United Kingdom) Andrew Lapthorne / (United Kingdom) Peter Norfolk (champions)
2. (United States) David Wagner / (Israel) Noam Gershony (final)

== Main draw ==
Key

- Q = Qualifier
- WC = Wild card
- LL = Lucky loser
- Alt = Alternate
- ITF = ITF entry
- PR = Protected ranking
- SR = Special ranking
- SE = Special exempt
- JE = Junior exempt
- JR = Junior Accelerator Programme entrant
- CO = College Accelerator Programme entrant
- NG = Next Gen Accelerator Program entrant
- w/o = Walkover
- r = Retired
- d = Defaulted

=== Finals ===
Finals
1	(United Kingdom) Andrew Lapthorne (United Kingdom) Peter Norfolk	6	6
2	(United States) David Wagner (Israel) Noam Gershony	4	2
