= Herkko Pöllänen =

Finnish tennis player (born 1994)

- Country (sports): Finland
- Born: 21 July 1994 (age 31) Helsinki, Finland
- Plays: Right-handed
- Prize money: $15,998

Singles
- Career record: 1–2 (at ATP Tour level, Grand Slam level, and in Davis Cup)
- Career titles: 0 ITF
- Highest ranking: No. 711 (13 January 2014)

Doubles
- Career record: 0–0 (at ATP Tour level, Grand Slam level, and in Davis Cup)
- Career titles: 3 ITF
- Highest ranking: No. 526 (3 April 2017)

Herkko Pöllänen (born 21 July 1994) is a Finnish tennis player.

Pöllänen has a career high ATP singles ranking of No. 711 achieved on 13 January 2014 and a career high ATP doubles ranking of No. 526 achieved on 3 April 2017.

Pöllänen represents Finland at the Davis Cup where he has a W/L record of 1–3. His first Davis Cup win came against Latvian tennis player Mārtiņš Podžus.
