= 2012 Australian Open – Girls' doubles =

Girls' doubles
- 2012 Australian Open

Final
- Champions: (United States) Gabrielle Andrews (United States) Taylor Townsend
- Runners-up: (Russia) Irina Khromacheva (Montenegro) Danka Kovinić
- Score: 5–7, 7–5, [10–6]

Events
| Singles | men | women | | boys | girls |
| Doubles | men | women | mixed | boys | girls |
| WC Singles | men | women | quad |
| WC Doubles | men | women | quad |
| Legends | men | women | mixed |
- Australian Open

An-Sophie Mestach and Demi Schuurs were the defending champions but neither of them were eligible to participate in 2012.

American pair Gabrielle Andrews and Taylor Townsend won the title, defeating Irina Khromacheva and Danka Kovinić in the final, 5–7, 7–5, [10–6].

== Seeds ==
1. (Russia) Irina Khromacheva / (Montenegro) Danka Kovinić (final)
2. (Netherlands) Indy de Vroome / (Estonia) Anett Kontaveit (second round, retired)
3. (Romania) Ilka Csöregi / (Russia) Elizaveta Kulichkova (semifinals)
4. (Uzbekistan) Sabina Sharipova / (Slovakia) Anna Karolína Schmiedlová (quarterfinals)
5. (United States) Kyle McPhillips / (Russia) Yulia Putintseva (quarterfinals)
6. (Russia) ~~Varvara Flink~~ / (Croatia) ~~Donna Vekić~~ (withdrew)
7. (Kazakhstan) Anna Danilina / (Poland) Zuzanna Maciejewska (second round)
8. (Canada) Eugenie Bouchard / (Canada) Carol Zhao (quarterfinals)

== Draw ==
Key

- Q = Qualifier
- WC = Wild card
- LL = Lucky loser
- Alt = Alternate
- ITF = ITF entry
- PR = Protected ranking
- SR = Special ranking
- SE = Special exempt
- JE = Junior exempt
- JR = Junior Accelerator Programme entrant
- CO = College Accelerator Programme entrant
- NG = Next Gen Accelerator Program entrant
- w/o = Walkover
- r = Retired
- d = Defaulted

=== Finals ===
Semifinals
1 | (Russia) Irina Khromacheva (Montenegro) Danka Kovinić | 6 | 6
3 | (Romania) Ilka Csöregi (Russia) Elizaveta Kulichkova | 3 | 4
(United States) Gabrielle Andrews (United States) Taylor Townsend | 6 | 6
(India) Rutuja Bhosale (Indonesia) Aldila Sutjiadi | 3 | 1

Final
1 | (Russia) Irina Khromacheva (Montenegro) Danka Kovinić | 7 | 5 | [6]
(United States) Gabrielle Andrews (United States) Taylor Townsend | 5 | 7 | [10]

=== Top half ===
First round
1 | (Russia) Irina Khromacheva (Montenegro) Danka Kovinić | 6 | 6
(Japan) Makoto Ninomiya (Japan) Riko Sawayanagi | 4 | 4
(Croatia) Iva Mekovec (France) Jade Suvrijn | 3 | 5
(United States) Krista Hardebeck (United States) Catherine Harrison | 6 | 7
(Russia) Olga Doroshina (United States) Christina Makarova | 6 | 6
(United States) Julia Elbaba (New Zealand) Emily Fanning | 1 | 4
WC | (Australia) Brigitte Beck (Australia) Ebony Panoho | 2 | 4
5 | (United States) Kyle McPhillips (Russia) Yulia Putintseva | 6 | 6
3 | (Romania) Ilka Csöregi (Russia) Elizaveta Kulichkova | 6 | 7
WC | (Australia) Zoe Hives (Australia) Belinda Woolcock | 3 | 5
(South Korea) Jang Su-jeong (South Korea) Lee So-ra | 6 | 2 | [13]
(Sweden) Ellen Allgurin (United States) Stephanie Nauta | 3 | 6 | [11]
(Japan) Miyu Kato (Japan) Risa Ozaki | 4 | 6 | [10]
(Czech Republic) Barbora Krejčíková (Czech Republic) Petra Rohanová | 6 | 3 | [8]
(Switzerland) Mégane Bianco (Liechtenstein) Kathinka von Deichmann | 1 | 6 | [6]
8 | (Canada) Eugenie Bouchard (Canada) Carol Zhao | 6 | 4 | [10]

Second round
1 | (Russia) I Khromacheva (Montenegro) D Kovinić | 2 | 6 | [10]
(United States) K Hardebeck (United States) C Harrison | 6 | 0 | [4]
(Russia) O Doroshina (United States) C Makarova | 4 | 3
5 | (United States) K McPhillips (Russia) Y Putintseva | 6 | 6
3 | (Romania) I Csöregi (Russia) E Kulichkova | 6 | 4 | [10]
(South Korea) S-j Jang (South Korea) S-r Lee | 4 | 6 | [4]
(Japan) M Kato (Japan) R Ozaki | 2 | 4
8 | (Canada) E Bouchard (Canada) C Zhao | 6 | 6

Quarterfinals
1 | (Russia) I Khromacheva (Montenegro) D Kovinić | 6 | 6
5 | (United States) K McPhillips (Russia) Y Putintseva | 2 | 1
3 | (Romania) I Csöregi (Russia) E Kulichkova | 6 | 6
8 | (Canada) E Bouchard (Canada) C Zhao | 4 | 2

Semifinals
1 | (Russia) I Khromacheva (Montenegro) D Kovinić | 6 | 6
3 | (Romania) I Csöregi (Russia) E Kulichkova | 3 | 4

=== Bottom half ===
First round
7 | (Kazakhstan) Anna Danilina (Poland) Zuzanna Maciejewska | 4 | 6 | [10]
(Japan) Mami Adachi (Japan) Miho Kowase | 6 | 2 | [3]
(Romania) Elena-Theodora Cadar (Romania) Ioana Loredana Roșca | 0 | 1
(United States) Gabrielle Andrews (United States) Taylor Townsend | 6 | 6
Alt | (Italy) Francesca Palmigiano (Bulgaria) Viktoriya Tomova | 2 | 1
(Brazil) Beatriz Haddad Maia (Czech Republic) Jesika Malečková | 6 | 6
WC | (Australia) Brooke Rischbieth (Australia) Storm Sanders | 4 | 6 | [9]
4 | (Uzbekistan) Sabina Sharipova (Slovakia) Anna Karolína Schmiedlová | 6 | 4 | [11]
Alt | (India) Ratnika Batra (Australia) Georgiana Ruhrig | 6 | 4 | [5]
(India) Rutuja Bhosale (Indonesia) Aldila Sutjiadi | 1 | 6 | [10]
WC | (Australia) Naiktha Bains (Australia) Danielle Wagland | 3 | 7^{7} | [10]
(United States) Samantha Crawford (United States) Sachia Vickery | 6 | 6^{1} | [7]
(Romania) Irina Maria Bara (Latvia) Jeļena Ostapenko | 6 | 4 | [10]
(Italy) Camilla Rosatello (China) Zheng Saisai | 4 | 6 | [5]
(Japan) Nao Hibino (Japan) Eri Hozumi | 4 | 4
2 | (Netherlands) Indy de Vroome (Estonia) Anett Kontaveit | 6 | 6

Second round
7 | (Kazakhstan) A Danilina (Poland) Z Maciejewska | 2 | 2
(United States) G Andrews (United States) T Townsend | 6 | 6
(Brazil) B Haddad Maia (Czech Republic) J Malečková | 2 | 4
4 | (Uzbekistan) S Sharipova (Slovakia) AK Schmiedlová | 6 | 6
(India) R Bhosale (Indonesia) A Sutjiadi | 5 | 6 | [10]
(Australia) N Bains (Australia) D Wagland | 7 | 2 | [5]
(Romania) IM Bara (Latvia) J Ostapenko | w/o
2 | (Netherlands) I de Vroome (Estonia) A Kontaveit

Quarterfinals
(United States) G Andrews (United States) T Townsend | 6 | 6
4 | (Uzbekistan) S Sharipova (Slovakia) AK Schmiedlová | 1 | 0
(India) R Bhosale (Indonesia) A Sutjiadi | 5 | 6 | [10]
(Romania) IM Bara (Latvia) J Ostapenko | 7 | 1 | [7]

Semifinals
(United States) G Andrews (United States) T Townsend | 6 | 6
(India) R Bhosale (Indonesia) A Sutjiadi | 3 | 1
