= 2012 Australian Open – Wheelchair men's singles =

Wheelchair men's singles
- 2012 Australian Open

Final
- Champion: (Netherlands) Maikel Scheffers
- Runner-up: (France) Nicolas Peifer
- Score: 3–6, 7–6^{(7–2)}, 6–0

Events
| Singles | men | women | | boys | girls |
| Doubles | men | women | mixed | boys | girls |
| WC Singles | men | women | quad |
| WC Doubles | men | women | quad |
| Legends | men | women | mixed |
- Australian Open

Maikel Scheffers defeated Nicolas Peifer in the final, 3–6, 7–6^{(7–2)}, 6–0 to win the men's singles wheelchair tennis title at the 2012 Australian Open.

Shingo Kunieda was the five-time reigning champion, but did not participate.

The 2012 Australian Open – Wheelchair men's singles is a tennis tournament featuring 8 paraplegic men tennis players, which is part of the NEC Tour. The tournament takes place at Melbourne Park in Melbourne, Australia, from 25 January to 28 January 2012, it is the 10th edition of the Australian Open men's wheelchair event and the first Grand Slam event of 2012. The tournament is played on Plexicushion Prestige AO hard courts, which is rated a medium-fast pace by the ITF. The competition is organised by the International Tennis Federation and Tennis Australia.

== Seeds ==
1. (Netherlands) Maikel Scheffers (champion)
2. (France) Stéphane Houdet (semifinals)

== Draw ==
Key

- Q = Qualifier
- WC = Wild card
- LL = Lucky loser
- Alt = Alternate
- ITF = ITF entry
- PR = Protected ranking
- SR = Special ranking
- SE = Special exempt
- JE = Junior exempt
- JR = Junior Accelerator Programme entrant
- CO = College Accelerator Programme entrant
- NG = Next Gen Accelerator Program entrant
- w/o = Walkover
- r = Retired
- d = Defaulted

=== Finals ===
Quarterfinals
1 | (Netherlands) Maikel Scheffers | 4 | 6 | 6
(Japan) Satoshi Saida | 6 | 2 | 3
(Sweden) Stefan Olsson | 6 | 6
WC | (Australia) Ben Weekes | 1 | 0
(France) Nicolas Peifer | 6 | 6
(Netherlands) Robin Ammerlaan | 3 | 1
(Netherlands) Ronald Vink | 4 | 7^{9} | 4
2 | (France) Stéphane Houdet | 6 | 6^{7} | 6

Semifinals
1 | (Netherlands) Maikel Scheffers | 2 | 7 | 9
(Sweden) Stefan Olsson | 6 | 5 | 7
(France) Nicolas Peifer | 6 | 6
2 | (France) Stéphane Houdet | 4 | 4

Final
1 | (Netherlands) Maikel Scheffers | 3 | 7^{7} | 6
(France) Nicolas Peifer | 6 | 6^{2} | 0
