= 2012 Australian Open – Wheelchair quad singles =

Wheelchair quad singles
- 2012 Australian Open

Final
- Champion: (United Kingdom) Peter Norfolk
- Runner-up: (United States) David Wagner
- Score: 4–6, 6–4, 6–2

Events
Singles	men	women		boys	girls
Doubles	men	women	mixed	boys	girls
WC Singles	men	women	quad
WC Doubles	men	women	quad
Legends	men	women	mixed
- Australian Open

Peter Norfolk defeated the defending champion David Wagner in the final, 4–6, 6–4, 6–2 to win the quad singles wheelchair tennis title at the 2012 Australian Open.

== Seeds ==
1. (United States) David Wagner (final)
2. (United Kingdom) Peter Norfolk (champion)

== Draw ==
Key

- Q = Qualifier
- WC = Wild card
- LL = Lucky loser
- Alt = Alternate
- ITF = ITF entry
- PR = Protected ranking
- SR = Special ranking
- SE = Special exempt
- JE = Junior exempt
- JR = Junior Accelerator Programme entrant
- CO = College Accelerator Programme entrant
- NG = Next Gen Accelerator Program entrant
- w/o = Walkover
- r = Retired
- d = Defaulted

=== Final ===
Final
1	(United States) David Wagner	6	4	2
2	(United Kingdom) Peter Norfolk	4	6	6

=== Round robin ===
		(United States) Wagner	(Israel) Gershony	(United Kingdom) Lapthorne	(United Kingdom) Norfolk	RR; W–L	Set; W–L	Game; W–L	Standings
1	(United States) David Wagner		5–7, 3–6	6–0, 7–6 (7–5)	6–4, 6–3	2–1	4–2	34–26	1
	(Israel) Noam Gershony	7–5, 6–3		7–5, 6–1	3–6, 0–6	2–1	4–2	29–26	3
WC	(United Kingdom) Andrew Lapthorne	0–6, 6–7 (5–7)	5–7, 1–6		4–6, 6–7(6–8)	0–3	0–6	22–29	4
2	(United Kingdom) Peter Norfolk	4–6, 3–6	6–3, 6–0	6–4, 7–6(8–6)		2–1	4–2	32–25	2

Standings are determined by: 1. number of wins; 2. number of matches; 3. in two-players-ties, head-to-head records; 4. in three-players-ties, percentage of sets won, or of games won; 5. steering-committee decision.
