= 2012 Australian Open – Men's singles =

Men's singles
- 2012 Australian Open

Final
- Champion: (Serbia) Novak Djokovic
- Runner-up: (Spain) Rafael Nadal
- Score: 5–7, 6–4, 6–2, 6–7^{(5–7)}, 7–5

Details
- Draw: 128 (16Q / 8WC)
- Seeds: 32

Events
Singles	men	women		boys	girls
Doubles	men	women	mixed	boys	girls
WC Singles	men	women	quad
WC Doubles	men	women	quad
Legends	men	women	mixed
- Australian Open

Defending champion Novak Djokovic defeated Rafael Nadal in the final, 5–7, 6–4, 6–2, 6–7^{(5–7)}, 7–5 to win the men's singles tennis title at the 2012 Australian Open. It was his third Australian Open title and fifth major title overall. The final lasted 5 hours and 53 minutes, the longest match in Australian Open history and the longest major singles final of all time. It is considered by many to be one of the greatest matches in tennis history.

This edition of the tournament saw the top four seeds advance to the semifinals. It is also the last major, and tournament overall, in which all of the Big Four reached the semifinals.

This was the last Australian Open for former world No. 1s Andy Roddick and Juan Carlos Ferrero.

== Seeds ==
1. (Serbia) Novak Djokovic (champion)
2. (Spain) Rafael Nadal (final)
3. (Switzerland) Roger Federer (semifinals)
4. (United Kingdom) Andy Murray (semifinals)
5. (Spain) David Ferrer (quarterfinals)
6. (France) Jo-Wilfried Tsonga (fourth round)
7. (Czech Republic) Tomáš Berdych (quarterfinals)
8. (United States) Mardy Fish (second round)
9. (Serbia) Janko Tipsarević (third round)
10. (Spain) Nicolás Almagro (fourth round)
11. (Argentina) Juan Martín del Potro (quarterfinals)
12. (France) Gilles Simon (second round)
13. (Ukraine) Alexandr Dolgopolov (third round)
14. (France) Gaël Monfils (third round)
15. (United States) Andy Roddick (second round, Retired because of a hamstring injury)^{[h]}
16. (United States) John Isner (third round)
17. (France) Richard Gasquet (fourth round)
18. (Spain) Feliciano López (fourth round)
19. (Serbia) Viktor Troicki (second round)
20. (Germany) ~~Florian Mayer~~ (withdrew because of a hip strain, replaced by Rik de Voest)
21. (Switzerland) Stan Wawrinka (third round)
22. (Spain) Fernando Verdasco (first round)
23. (Canada) Milos Raonic (third round)
24. (Japan) Kei Nishikori (quarterfinals)
25. (Argentina) Juan Mónaco (first round)
26. (Spain) Marcel Granollers (second round)
27. (Argentina) Juan Ignacio Chela (third round)
28. (Croatia) Ivan Ljubičić (first round)
29. (Czech Republic) Radek Štěpánek (first round)
30. (South Africa) Kevin Anderson (third round)
31. (Austria) Jürgen Melzer (first round)
32. (Russia) Alex Bogomolov Jr. (second round)

Click on the seed number of a player to go to their draw section.

== Draw ==
Key

- Q = Qualifier
- WC = Wild card
- LL = Lucky loser
- Alt = Alternate
- ITF = ITF entry
- PR = Protected ranking
- SR = Special ranking
- SE = Special exempt
- JE = Junior exempt
- JR = Junior Accelerator Programme entrant
- CO = College Accelerator Programme entrant
- NG = Next Gen Accelerator Program entrant
- w/o = Walkover
- r = Retired
- d = Defaulted

=== Finals ===
Quarterfinals
1	(Serbia) Novak Djokovic	6	7^{7}	6
5	(Spain) David Ferrer	4	6^{4}	1
4	(United Kingdom) Andy Murray	6	6	6
24	(Japan) Kei Nishikori	3	3	1
11	(Argentina) Juan Martín del Potro	4	3	2
3	(Switzerland) Roger Federer	6	6	6
7	(Czech Republic) Tomáš Berdych	7^{7}	6^{6}	4	3
2	(Spain) Rafael Nadal	6^{5}	7^{8}	6	6

Semifinals
1	(Serbia) Novak Djokovic	6	3	6^{4}	6	7
4	(United Kingdom) Andy Murray	3	6	7^{7}	1	5
3	(Switzerland) Roger Federer	7^{7}	2	6^{5}	4
2	(Spain) Rafael Nadal	6^{5}	6	7^{7}	6

Final
1	(Serbia) Novak Djokovic	5	6	6	6^{5}	7
2	(Spain) Rafael Nadal	7	4	2	7^{7}	5

=== Top half ===
==== Section 1 ====
First round
1	(Serbia) N Djokovic	6	6	6
(Italy) P Lorenzi	2	0	0
(Colombia) S Giraldo	6	6	6
Q	(Italy) M Viola	4	2	1
WC	(Japan) T Ito	6	4	6	6
(Italy) P Starace	3	6	3	4
(France) N Mahut	7	7	6
29	(Czech Republic) R Štěpánek	5	5	3
23	(Canada) M Raonic	6	6	6
(Italy) F Volandri	4	0	2
(Czech Republic) L Rosol	0	0	2
(Germany) P Petzschner	6	6	6
(Germany) C-M Stebe	5	4	6	5
WC	(Australia) L Hewitt	7	6	3	7
(Netherlands) R Haase	3	4	1
15	(United States) A Roddick	6	6	6

Second round
1	(Serbia) N Djokovic	6	6	6
(Colombia) S Giraldo	3	2	1
WC	(Japan) T Ito	6	6^{6}	2	2
(France) N Mahut	1	7^{8}	6	6
23	(Canada) M Raonic	6	5	6	7
(Germany) P Petzschner	4	7	2	5
WC	(Australia) L Hewitt (Note: Lleyton Hewitt advanced to the third round after Andy Roddick was forced to retire after the third set because of a hamstring injury.)	3	6	6	0
15	(United States) A Roddick	6	3	4	0^{r}

Third round
1	(Serbia) N Djokovic	6	6	6
(France) N Mahut	0	1	1
23	(Canada) M Raonic	6	3	6^{5}	3
WC	(Australia) L Hewitt	4	6	7^{7}	6

Fourth round
1	(Serbia) N Djokovic	6	6	4	6
WC	(Australia) L Hewitt	1	3	6	3

==== Section 2 ====
First round
9	(Serbia) J Tipsarević	5	7^{14}	6	6
(Russia) D Tursunov	7	6^{12}	3	4
Q	(Estonia) J Zopp	3	4	4
WC	(Australia) J Duckworth	6	6	6
(Russia) M Youzhny	5	7^{7}	4	6	3
Q	(Kazakhstan) A Golubev	7	6^{4}	6	4	6
(Italy) A Seppi	3	6	3	1
17	(France) R Gasquet	6	3	6	6
27	(Argentina) JI Chela	7^{7}	6	6
(United States) M Russell	6^{3}	3	4
(Russia) I Kunitsyn	1	6^{12}	0
(Spain) P Andújar	6	7^{14}	6
(Germany) M Bachinger	4	4	2
(United States) R Sweeting	6	6	6
(Portugal) R Machado	1	4	2
5	(Spain) D Ferrer	6	6	6

Second round
9	(Serbia) J Tipsarević	3	6	7^{7}	6
WC	(Australia) J Duckworth	6	2	6^{5}	4
Q	(Kazakhstan) A Golubev	4	2	0^{r}
17	(France) R Gasquet (Note: Richard Gasquet advanced to the third round after Andrey Golubev was forced to retire in the third set because of injury.)	6	6	3
27	(Argentina) JI Chela	6	6	6
(Spain) P Andújar	4	4	3
(United States) R Sweeting	7^{7}	2	6	2	3
5	(Spain) D Ferrer	6^{4}	6	3	6	6

Third round
9	(Serbia) J Tipsarević	3	3	1
17	(France) R Gasquet	6	6	6
27	(Argentina) JI Chela	5	2	1
5	(Spain) D Ferrer	7	6	6

Fourth round
17	(France) R Gasquet	4	4	1
5	(Spain) D Ferrer	6	6	6

==== Section 3 ====
First round
4	(United Kingdom) A Murray	4	6	6	6
(United States) R Harrison	6	3	4	2
(Belgium) X Malisse	6^{6}	0^{r}
(France) É Roger-Vasselin (Note: Édouard Roger-Vasselin advanced to the second round after Xavier Malisse was forced to retire after the first set because of an arm injury.)	7^{8}	0
(France) M Llodra	2	6	6	6
(Latvia) E Gulbis	6	1	2	2
(Spain) D Gimeno Traver	3	2	4
32	(Russia) A Bogomolov Jr.	6	6	6
19	(Serbia) V Troicki	4	6^{3}	6	7^{7}	6
(Spain) JC Ferrero	6	7^{7}	2	6^{3}	2
(Spain) G García López	4	3	0
(Kazakhstan) M Kukushkin	6	6	6
(Brazil) T Bellucci	7^{7}	6	6
(Israel) D Sela	6^{5}	4	3
WC	(Australia) M Matosevic	6^{5}	3	3
14	(France) G Monfils	7^{7}	6	6

Second round
4	(United Kingdom) A Murray	6	6	6
(France) É Roger-Vasselin	1	4	4
(France) M Llodra	6	6	4	5	6
32	(Russia) A Bogomolov Jr.	1	3	6	7	4
19	(Serbia) V Troicki	7	4	2	6	3
(Kazakhstan) M Kukushkin	5	6	6	4	6
(Brazil) T Bellucci	6	0	4	2
14	(France) G Monfils	2	6	6	6

Third round
4	(United Kingdom) A Murray	6	6	6
(France) M Llodra	4	2	0
(Kazakhstan) M Kukushkin	6	7	5	1	6
14	(France) G Monfils	2	5	7	6	4

Fourth round
4	(United Kingdom) A Murray (Note: Andy Murray advanced to the quarterfinals after Mikhail Kukushkin was forced to retire in the third set because of a left hip flexor injury.)	6	6	1
(Kazakhstan) M Kukushkin	1	1	0^{r}

==== Section 4 ====
First round
12	(France) G Simon	6	3	6^{5}	6	6
Q	(Thailand) D Udomchoke	1	6	7^{7}	3	2
(France) J Benneteau	6	6	7
(Slovakia) K Beck	4	2	5
(Brazil) J Souza	3	6^{1}	2
(Australia) M Ebden	6	7^{7}	6
(France) S Robert	1	6^{7}	0
24	(Japan) K Nishikori	6	7^{9}	6
26	(Spain) M Granollers	6	7^{7}	5	5	6
WC	(United States) J Levine	0	6^{4}	7	7	3
(Portugal) F Gil (Note: Frederico Gil advanced to the second round after Ivan Dodig was forced to retire in the fourth set because of shoulder and back injuries.)	2	6	6	4
(Croatia) I Dodig	6	1	1	1^{r}
Q	(Spain) R Bautista Agut	4	4	5
(Brazil) R Mello	6	6	7
(Uzbekistan) D Istomin	4	6	2	5
6	(France) J-W Tsonga	6	3	6	7

Second round
12	(France) G Simon	5	6^{8}	6	6	2
(France) J Benneteau	7	7^{10}	1	3	6
(Australia) M Ebden	6	6	4	1	1
24	(Japan) K Nishikori	3	1	6	6	6
26	(Spain) M Granollers	3	6	4	3
(Portugal) F Gil	6	4	6	6
(Brazil) R Mello	5	4	4
6	(France) J-W Tsonga	7	6	6

Third round
(France) J Benneteau	6	6^{3}	6^{4}	3
24	(Japan) K Nishikori	4	7^{7}	7^{7}	6
(Portugal) F Gil	2	2	2
6	(France) J-W Tsonga	6	6	6

Fourth round
24	(Japan) K Nishikori	2	6	6	3	6
6	(France) J-W Tsonga	6	2	1	6	3

=== Bottom half ===
==== Section 5 ====
First round
8	(United States) M Fish	6	6	6
(Luxembourg) G Müller	4	4	2
(Colombia) A Falla	6	6	3	6
(Italy) F Fognini	3	2	6	1
(Spain) A Montañés	6^{2}	6	4	6^{5}
(Spain) P Riba	7^{7}	2	6	7^{7}
(Germany) P Kohlschreiber	7	4	6	6^{4}	6
25	(Argentina) J Mónaco	5	6	3	7^{7}	0
LL	(South Africa) R de Voest	4	6	1	6	3
(Chinese Taipei) Y-h Lu	6	3	6	3	6
Q	(France) F Serra (Note: Florent Serra advanced to the second round after Steve Darcis was forced to retire in the third set, leading two sets to love, because of leg cramps.)	6^{3}	3	5
(Belgium) S Darcis	7^{7}	6	4^{r}
Q	(United Kingdom) J Ward	4	3	4
(Slovenia) B Kavčič	6	6	6
(France) A Mannarino	6	1	5	4
11	(Argentina) JM del Potro	2	6	7	6

Second round
8	(United States) M Fish	6^{4}	3	6^{6}
(Colombia) A Falla	7^{7}	6	7^{8}
(Spain) P Riba	0	0^{r}
(Germany) P Kohlschreiber (Note: Philipp Kohlschreiber advanced to the third round after Pere Riba was forced to retire in the second set because of a left foot injury.)	6	4
(Chinese Taipei) Y-h Lu	7	6	6
Q	(France) F Serra	5	2	2
(Slovenia) B Kavčič	4	5	3
11	(Argentina) JM del Potro	6	7	6

Third round
(Colombia) A Falla	3	2	6^{3}
(Germany) P Kohlschreiber	6	6	7^{7}
(Chinese Taipei) Y-h Lu	2	3	0
11	(Argentina) JM del Potro	6	6	6

Fourth round
(Germany) P Kohlschreiber	4	2	1
11	(Argentina) JM del Potro	6	6	6

==== Section 6 ====
First round
13	(Ukraine) A Dolgopolov	1	4	6	6	6
WC	(Australia) G Jones	6	6	1	1	2
(Germany) T Kamke	6	6	6
(Romania) V Hănescu	2	1	2
WC	(France) K de Schepper	3	2	2
(United States) S Querrey	6	6	6
(Australia) B Tomic	4	6^{3}	6	6	7
22	(Spain) F Verdasco	6	7^{7}	4	2	5
31	(Austria) J Melzer	6^{3}	5	3
(Croatia) I Karlović	7^{7}	7	6
(Argentina) C Berlocq	2	6	7^{7}	6
Q	(Netherlands) J Huta Galung	6	3	6^{3}	3
(France) É Prodon	4	2	6	5
(Germany) A Beck	6	6	4	7
Q	(Russia) A Kudryavtsev	5	2	2
3	(Switzerland) R Federer	7	6	6

Second round
13	(Ukraine) A Dolgopolov	4	6	6	3	8
(Germany) T Kamke	6	1	1	6	6
(United States) S Querrey	6	3	6^{3}	3
(Australia) B Tomic	3	6	7^{7}	6
(Croatia) I Karlović	7^{7}	3	6	6
(Argentina) C Berlocq	6^{4}	6	3	4
(Germany) A Beck
3	(Switzerland) R Federer (Note: Roger Federer received a walkover into the third round after Andreas Beck withdrew from the tournament because of a lower back injury.)	w/o

Third round
13	(Ukraine) A Dolgopolov	6	6^{0}	6^{6}	6	3
(Australia) B Tomic	4	7^{7}	7^{8}	2	6
(Croatia) I Karlović	6^{6}	5	3
3	(Switzerland) R Federer	7^{8}	7	6

Fourth round
(Australia) B Tomic	4	2	2
3	(Switzerland) R Federer	6	6	6

==== Section 7 ====
First round
7	(Czech Republic) T Berdych	7	4	6	6
(Spain) A Ramos Viñolas	5	6	2	3
(Belgium) O Rochus	6	6	6
Q	(Germany) B Phau	1	4	0
(Ukraine) S Stakhovsky	6	6^{9}	4	6	7
Q	(Ukraine) I Marchenko	3	7^{11}	6	3	5
Q	(Denmark) F Nielsen	1	2	4
30	(South Africa) K Anderson	6	6	6
21	(Switzerland) S Wawrinka	6	6	7
(France) B Paire	1	1	5
(Cyprus) M Baghdatis	6	7^{7}	6
PR	(Germany) B Becker	1	6^{5}	2
(France) J Chardy	6	3	6	4	4
(Bulgaria) G Dimitrov	4	6	3	6	6
(Poland) Ł Kubot	6	5	3	5
10	(Spain) N Almagro	1	7	6	7

Second round
7	(Czech Republic) T Berdych	6	6	7^{7}
(Belgium) O Rochus	1	0	6^{4}
(Ukraine) S Stakhovsky	6	1	6^{3}	3
30	(South Africa) K Anderson	3	6	7^{7}	6
21	(Switzerland) S Wawrinka	7^{7}	6	5	6
(Cyprus) M Baghdatis	6^{3}	4	7	1
(Bulgaria) G Dimitrov	6	3	7^{7}	4	0
10	(Spain) N Almagro	4	6	6^{4}	6	6

Third round
7	(Czech Republic) T Berdych	7^{7}	7^{7}	6
30	(South Africa) K Anderson	6^{5}	6^{1}	1
21	(Switzerland) S Wawrinka	6^{2}	2	4
10	(Spain) N Almagro	7^{7}	6	6

Fourth round
7	(Czech Republic) T Berdych	4	7^{7}	7^{7}	7^{7}
10	(Spain) N Almagro	6	6^{5}	6^{3}	6^{2}

==== Section 8 ====
First round
16	(United States) J Isner	6	6	7^{7}
WC	(Australia) B Mitchell	4	4	6^{1}
(Finland) J Nieminen	4	2^{r}
(Argentina) D Nalbandian (Note: David Nalbandian advanced to the second round after Jarkko Nieminen was forced to retire in the second set because of stomach cramps.)	6	4
(Italy) F Cipolla	6	4	3	6	6
(Russia) N Davydenko	4	6	6	2	1
(Argentina) L Mayer	6^{5}	3	6^{2}
18	(Spain) F López	7^{7}	6	7^{7}
28	(Croatia) I Ljubičić	6	6	3	4	4
Q	(Slovakia) L Lacko	3	4	6	6	6
Q	(Germany) P Gojowczyk	1	2	6	6	2
(United States) D Young	6	6	4	1	6
PR	(Germany) T Haas	7^{7}	3	6	7
Q	(United States) D Kudla	6^{5}	6	0	5
Q	(United States) A Kuznetsov	4	1	1
2	(Spain) R Nadal	6	6	6

Second round
16	(United States) J Isner	4	6	2	7^{7}	10
(Argentina) D Nalbandian	6	3	6	6^{5}	8
(Italy) F Cipolla	5	6^{4}	2
18	(Spain) F López	7	7^{7}	6
Q	(Slovakia) L Lacko	6	6	3	6
(United States) D Young	3	1	6	3
PR	(Germany) T Haas	4	3	4
2	(Spain) R Nadal	6	6	6

Third round
16	(United States) J Isner	3	7^{7}	4	7^{7}	1
18	(Spain) F López	6	6^{3}	6	6^{0}	6
Q	(Slovakia) L Lacko	2	4	2
2	(Spain) R Nadal	6	6	6

Fourth round
18	(Spain) F López	4	4	2
2	(Spain) R Nadal	6	6	6

== Notes ==
Preceded by 2011 US Open – Men's singles	Grand Slam men's singles	Succeeded by 2012 French Open – Men's singles
