= 2012 Australian Open – Wheelchair men's doubles =

Wheelchair men's doubles
- 2012 Australian Open

Final
- Champion: (Netherlands) Ronald Vink (Netherlands) Robin Ammerlaan
- Runner-up: (France) Stéphane Houdet (France) Nicolas Peifer
- Score: 6–2, 4–6, 6–1

Events
Singles	men	women		boys	girls
Doubles	men	women	mixed	boys	girls
WC Singles	men	women	quad
WC Doubles	men	women	quad
Legends	men	women	mixed
← 2011 ·	Australian Open	· 2013 →

Ronald Vink and Robin Ammerlaan defeated Stéphane Houdet and Nicolas Peifer in the final, 6–2, 4–6, 6–1 to win the men's doubles wheelchair tennis title at the 2012 Australian Open.

The 2012 Australian Open – Wheelchair men's doubles was a tennis tournament that featured 8 paraplegic male tennis players, which was part of the NEC Tour. The tournament took place at Melbourne Park in Melbourne, Australia, from 25 January to 28 January 2012, it was the 10th edition of the Australian Open men's wheelchair event and the first Grand Slam event of 2012. The tournament was played on Plexicushion Prestige AO hard courts, which was rated a medium-fast pace by the ITF. The competition was organised by the International Tennis Federation and Tennis Australia.

Shingo Kunieda and Maikel Scheffers were the reigning champions, but Kunieda did not participate. Scheffers partnered Satoshi Saida, but was defeated in the semifinals by Houdet and Peifer.

== Seeds ==
1. (France) Stéphane Houdet / (France) Nicolas Peifer (final)
2. (Netherlands) Ronald Vink / (Netherlands) Robin Ammerlaan (champions)

== Draw ==
=== Key ===
- Q = Qualifier
- WC = Wild card
- LL = Lucky loser
- Alt = Alternate
- ITF = ITF entry
- PR = Protected ranking
- SR = Special ranking
- SE = Special exempt
- JE = Junior exempt
- JR = Junior Accelerator Programme entrant
- CO = College Accelerator Programme entrant
- NG = Next Gen Accelerator Program entrant
- w/o = Walkover
- r = Retired
- d = Defaulted

=== Finals ===
Semifinals
1	(France) Stéphane Houdet (France) Nicolas Peifer	6	6
(Japan) Satoshi Saida (Netherlands) Maikel Scheffers	2	1
(Australia) Ben Weekes (Sweden) Stefan Olsson	3	2
2	(Netherlands) Ronald Vink (Netherlands) Robin Ammerlaan	6	6

Final
1	(France) Stéphane Houdet (France) Nicolas Peifer	2	6	1
2	(Netherlands) Ronald Vink (Netherlands) Robin Ammerlaan	6	4	6
