= 2012 Australian Open – Mixed doubles =

Mixed doubles
- 2012 Australian Open

Final
- Champions: (United States) Bethanie Mattek-Sands (Romania) Horia Tecău
- Runners-up: (Russia) Elena Vesnina (India) Leander Paes
- Score: 6–3, 5–7, [10–3]

Details
- Draw: 32
- Seeds: 8

Events
Singles	men	women		boys	girls
Doubles	men	women	mixed	boys	girls
WC Singles	men	women	quad
WC Doubles	men	women	quad
Legends	men	women	mixed
- Australian Open

Katarina Srebotnik and Daniel Nestor were the defending champions, but they chose not to participate together. Srebotnik was scheduled to play with Nenad Zimonjić, but the pair were forced to withdraw from their first round match after Srebotnik was injured during her 2nd round doubles match. Nestor was scheduled to play with Maria Kirilenko, but the pair withdrew after Kirilenko sustained an injury during her third round singles match.

Bethanie Mattek-Sands and Horia Tecău won the mixed doubles title at the 2012 Australian Open tennis tournament, defeating Elena Vesnina and Leander Paes in the final 6–3, 5–7, [10–3].

== Seeds ==
1. (Czech Republic) Květa Peschke / (United States) Mike Bryan (first round)
2. (Slovenia) Katarina Srebotnik / (Serbia) Nenad Zimonjić (withdrew)
3. (Russia) Maria Kirilenko / (Canada) Daniel Nestor (withdrew)
4. (United States) Lisa Raymond / (India) Rohan Bopanna (quarterfinals)
5. (Russia) Elena Vesnina / (India) Leander Paes (final)
6. (India) Sania Mirza / (India) Mahesh Bhupathi (semifinals)
7. (Czech Republic) Andrea Hlaváčková / (Pakistan) Aisam-ul-Haq Qureshi (quarterfinals)
8. (United States) Bethanie Mattek-Sands / (Romania) Horia Tecău (champions)

== Draw ==
Key

- Q = Qualifier
- WC = Wild card
- LL = Lucky loser
- Alt = Alternate
- ITF = ITF entry
- PR = Protected ranking
- SR = Special ranking
- SE = Special exempt
- JE = Junior exempt
- JR = Junior Accelerator Programme entrant
- CO = College Accelerator Programme entrant
- NG = Next Gen Accelerator Program entrant
- w/o = Walkover
- r = Retired
- d = Defaulted

=== Finals ===
Semifinals
Alt	(Italy) Roberta Vinci (Italy) Daniele Bracciali	7	2	[7]
5	(Russia) Elena Vesnina (India) Leander Paes	5	6	[10]
6	(India) Sania Mirza (India) Mahesh Bhupathi	3	3
8	(United States) Bethanie Mattek-Sands (Romania) Horia Tecău	6	6

Final
5	(Russia) Elena Vesnina (India) Leander Paes	3	7	[3]
8	(United States) Bethanie Mattek-Sands (Romania) Horia Tecău	6	5	[10]

=== Top half ===
First round
1	(Czech Republic) K Peschke (United States) M Bryan	6	2	[9]
Alt	(Italy) R Vinci (Italy) D Bracciali	3	6	[11]
WC	(Japan) K Date-Krumm (Japan) K Nishikori	6	6
(Argentina) G Dulko (Argentina) E Schwank	4	1
WC	(Australia) A Barty (Australia) B Mitchell	1	3
WC	(Serbia) J Janković (Australia) B Tomic	6	6
WC	(Australia) J Dokić (Australia) P Hanley	3	1
7	(Czech Republic) A Hlaváčková (Pakistan) A-u-H Qureshi	6	6
4	(United States) L Raymond (India) R Bopanna	6	6
(Kazakhstan) G Voskoboeva (Austria) A Peya	1	0
WC	(Australia) O Rogowska (Australia) M Matosevic	4	2
WC	(Australia) C Dellacqua (Australia) M Ebden	6	6
(Russia) N Petrova (Brazil) M Melo	6	6^{2}	[5]
(Chinese Taipei) S-w Hsieh (Poland) M Matkowski	4	7^{7}	[10]
(Russia) A Pavlyuchenkova (Belarus) M Mirnyi	2	5
5	(Russia) E Vesnina (India) L Paes	6	7

Second round
Alt	(Italy) R Vinci (Italy) D Bracciali	6	7^{8}
WC	(Japan) K Date-Krumm (Japan) K Nishikori	3	6^{6}
WC	(Serbia) J Janković (Australia) B Tomic	3	3
7	(Czech Republic) A Hlaváčková (Pakistan) A-u-H Qureshi	6	6
4	(United States) L Raymond (India) R Bopanna	6	6
WC	(Australia) C Dellacqua (Australia) M Ebden	4	2
(Chinese Taipei) S-w Hsieh (Poland) M Matkowski	3	5
5	(Russia) E Vesnina (India) L Paes	6	7

Quarterfinals
Alt	(Italy) R Vinci (Italy) D Bracciali	6	7
7	(Czech Republic) A Hlaváčková (Pakistan) A-u-H Qureshi	1	5
4	(United States) L Raymond (India) R Bopanna	2	2
5	(Russia) E Vesnina (India) L Paes	6	6

Semifinals
Alt	(Italy) R Vinci (Italy) D Bracciali	7	2	[7]
5	(Russia) E Vesnina (India) L Paes	5	6	[10]

=== Bottom half ===
First round
6	(India) S Mirza (India) M Bhupathi	6	6
(South Africa) N Grandin (Curaçao) J-J Rojer	4	2
(Czech Republic) I Benešová (Austria) J Melzer	6	7^{8}
(Spain) N Llagostera Vives (Austria) O Marach	1	6^{6}
(Czech Republic) V Uhlířová (United States) S Lipsky	7^{7}	7
Alt	(Slovenia) P Hercog (Colombia) J-S Cabal	6^{4}	5
(United States) L Huber (United Kingdom) C Fleming	7	6
Alt	(United States) R Kops-Jones (United States) E Butorac	5	2
8	(United States) B Mattek-Sands (Romania) H Tecău	4	6	[10]
(Czech Republic) L Hradecká (Czech Republic) F Čermák	6	3	[6]
(Australia) A Rodionova (Germany) C Kas	6	3	[5]
(Kazakhstan) Y Shvedova (Israel) A Ram	4	6	[10]
(United States) A Spears (Poland) M Fyrstenberg	6	5	[10]
(China) S Peng (United Kingdom) J Murray	3	7	[5]
WC	(Australia) J Gajdošová (Brazil) B Soares	6^{4}	6	[11]
Alt	(Poland) K Jans-Ignacik (Mexico) S González	7^{7}	2	[9]

Second round
6	(India) S Mirza (India) M Bhupathi	3	6	[12]
(Czech Republic) I Benešová (Austria) J Melzer	6	4	[10]
(Czech Republic) V Uhlířová (United States) S Lipsky	3	2
(United States) L Huber (United Kingdom) C Fleming	6	6
8	(United States) B Mattek-Sands (Romania) H Tecău	6	7^{7}
(Kazakhstan) Y Shvedova (Israel) A Ram	4	6^{2}
(United States) A Spears (Poland) M Fyrstenberg	3	2
WC	(Australia) J Gajdošová (Brazil) B Soares	6	6

Quarterfinals
6	(India) S Mirza (India) M Bhupathi	7^{7}	6
(United States) L Huber (United Kingdom) C Fleming	6^{5}	2
8	(United States) B Mattek-Sands (Romania) H Tecău	4	6	[13]
WC	(Australia) J Gajdošová (Brazil) B Soares	6	1	[11]

Semifinals
6	(India) S Mirza (India) M Bhupathi	3	3
8	(United States) B Mattek-Sands (Romania) H Tecău	6	6
