= 2012 Australian Open – Men's doubles =

Tennis tournament

Men's doubles
- 2012 Australian Open

Final
- Champion: (India) Leander Paes (Czech Republic) Radek Štěpánek
- Runner-up: (United States) Bob Bryan (United States) Mike Bryan
- Score: 7–6^{(7–1)}, 6–2

Details
- Draw: 64
- Seeds: 16

Events
Singles	men	women		boys	girls
Doubles	men	women	mixed	boys	girls
WC Singles	men	women	quad
WC Doubles	men	women	quad
Legends	men	women	mixed
- Australian Open

Bob and Mike Bryan were the three-time defending champions, but lost to the unseeded pair Leander Paes and Radek Štěpánek, 7–6^{(7–1)}, 6–2, in the final. With this win Paes completed the career grand slam in men's doubles.

== Seeds ==
1. (United States) Bob Bryan / (United States) Mike Bryan (final)
2. (Belarus) Max Mirnyi / (Canada) Daniel Nestor (semifinals)
3. (France) Michaël Llodra / (Serbia) Nenad Zimonjić (third round)
4. (India) Mahesh Bhupathi / (India) Rohan Bopanna (third round)
5. (Austria) Jürgen Melzer / (Germany) Philipp Petzschner (third round)
6. (Poland) Mariusz Fyrstenberg / (Poland) Marcin Matkowski (quarterfinals)
7. (Sweden) Robert Lindstedt / (Romania) Horia Tecău (semifinals)
8. (Pakistan) Aisam-ul-Haq Qureshi / (Curaçao) Jean-Julien Rojer (third round)
9. (Austria) Oliver Marach / (Austria) Alexander Peya (first round)
10. (United States) Eric Butorac / (Brazil) Bruno Soares (quarterfinals)
11. (Czech Republic) František Čermák / (Slovakia) Filip Polášek (third round)
12. (Mexico) Santiago González / (Germany) Christopher Kas (quarterfinals)
13. (United States) Scott Lipsky / (United States) Rajeev Ram (quarterfinals)
14. (Italy) Simone Bolelli / (Italy) Fabio Fognini (second round)
15. (United Kingdom) Colin Fleming / (United Kingdom) Ross Hutchins (third round)
16. (Australia) Paul Hanley / (United Kingdom) Jamie Murray (first round)

== Draw ==
Key

- Q = Qualifier
- WC = Wild card
- LL = Lucky loser
- Alt = Alternate
- ITF = ITF entry
- PR = Protected ranking
- SR = Special ranking
- SE = Special exempt
- JE = Junior exempt
- JR = Junior Accelerator Programme entrant
- CO = College Accelerator Programme entrant
- NG = Next Gen Accelerator Program entrant
- w/o = Walkover
- r = Retired
- d = Defaulted

=== Finals ===
Quarterfinals
1	(United States) Bob Bryan (United States) Mike Bryan	6	6^{4}	6
6	(Poland) Mariusz Fyrstenberg (Poland) Marcin Matkowski	4	7^{7}	4
13	(United States) Scott Lipsky (United States) Rajeev Ram	4	4
7	(Sweden) Robert Lindstedt (Romania) Horia Tecău	6	6
10	(United States) Eric Butorac (Brazil) Bruno Soares	4	6^{4}
(India) Leander Paes (Czech Republic) Radek Štěpánek	6	7^{7}
12	(Mexico) Santiago González (Germany) Christopher Kas	1	7^{7}	2
2	(Belarus) Max Mirnyi (Canada) Daniel Nestor	6	6^{4}	6

Semifinals
1	(United States) Bob Bryan (United States) Mike Bryan	4	6	7^{7}
7	(Sweden) Robert Lindstedt (Romania) Horia Tecău	6	3	6^{5}
(India) Leander Paes (Czech Republic) Radek Štěpánek	2	6	6
2	(Belarus) Max Mirnyi (Canada) Daniel Nestor	6	4	4

Final
1	(United States) Bob Bryan (United States) Mike Bryan	6^{1}	2
(India) Leander Paes (Czech Republic) Radek Štěpánek	7^{7}	6

=== Top half ===
==== Section 1 ====
First round
1	(United States) B Bryan (United States) M Bryan	7^{8}	6
(Israel) J Erlich (Israel) A Ram	6^{6}	4
WC	(Australia) L Hewitt (Australia) P Luczak	7	6
(Germany) M Bachinger (Germany) P Kohlschreiber	5	3
(Russia) A Bogomolov Jr. (Russia) I Kunitsyn	6	7
(Kazakhstan) M Kukushkin (Russia) D Tursunov	4	5
(United States) R Harrison (United States) R Sweeting	5	6^{2}
15	(United Kingdom) C Fleming (United Kingdom) R Hutchins	7	7^{7}
11	(Czech Republic) F Čermák (Slovakia) F Polášek	6	7^{7}
(France) J Benneteau (France) N Mahut	4	6^{1}
(Russia) M Elgin (Russia) A Kudryavtsev	6	7^{8}
(Netherlands) R Haase (Finland) J Nieminen	2	6^{6}
(Spain) P Andújar (Spain) G García López	6	2	6
Alt	(Germany) T Kamke (Denmark) F Nielsen	3	6	3
(United Kingdom) J Delgado (United Kingdom) J Marray	4	4
6	(Poland) M Fyrstenberg (Poland) M Matkowski	6	6

Second round
1	(United States) B Bryan (United States) M Bryan	6	7^{7}
WC	(Australia) L Hewitt (Australia) P Luczak	3	6^{5}
(Russia) A Bogomolov Jr. (Russia) I Kunitsyn	0	3
15	(United Kingdom) C Fleming (United Kingdom) R Hutchins	6	6
11	(Czech Republic) F Čermák (Slovakia) F Polášek	4	6	7
(Russia) M Elgin (Russia) A Kudryavtsev	6	4	5
(Spain) P Andújar (Spain) G García López	3	5
6	(Poland) M Fyrstenberg (Poland) M Matkowski	6	7

Third round
1	(United States) B Bryan (United States) M Bryan	6	0	6
15	(United Kingdom) C Fleming (United Kingdom) R Hutchins	4	6	2
11	(Czech Republic) F Čermák (Slovakia) F Polášek	4	3
6	(Poland) M Fyrstenberg (Poland) M Matkowski	6	6

Quarterfinals
1	(United States) B Bryan (United States) M Bryan	6	6^{4}	6
6	(Poland) M Fyrstenberg (Poland) M Matkowski	4	7^{7}	4

==== Section 2 ====
First round
4	(India) M Bhupathi (India) R Bopanna	5	6	6
WC	(Australia) M Ebden (Australia) C Guccione	7	4	4
(Croatia) I Karlović (Germany) F Moser	3	4
(Australia) C Ball (Philippines) TC Huey	6	6
(Slovakia) M Mertiňák (Brazil) A Sá	6	6
(Ukraine) A Dolgopolov (Ukraine) D Molchanov	2	2
(Spain) A Montañés (Spain) A Ramos	6^{4}	6^{8}
13	(United States) S Lipsky (United States) R Ram	7^{7}	7^{10}
9	(Austria) O Marach (Austria) A Peya	6^{4}	6	5
(Romania) V Hănescu (Belgium) O Rochus	7^{7}	4	7
(Colombia) A Falla (Colombia) S Giraldo	7^{7}	5	4
(Brazil) R Mello (Brazil) J Souza	6^{3}	7	6
WC	(Australia) C Ebelthite (Australia) M Matosevic	6	6
WC	(Australia) L Saville (Australia) A Whittington	0	3
(Sweden) A Siljeström (Slovakia) I Zelenay	3	6^{6}
7	(Sweden) R Lindstedt (Romania) H Tecău	6	7^{8}

Second round
4	(India) M Bhupathi (India) R Bopanna	6	6
(Australia) C Ball (Philippines) TC Huey	2	2
(Slovakia) M Mertiňák (Brazil) A Sá	7	3	2
13	(United States) S Lipsky (United States) R Ram	5	6	6
(Romania) V Hănescu (Belgium) O Rochus	4	4
(Brazil) R Mello (Brazil) J Souza	6	6
WC	(Australia) C Ebelthite (Australia) M Matosevic	6	4	2
7	(Sweden) R Lindstedt (Romania) H Tecău	3	6	6

Third round
4	(India) M Bhupathi (India) R Bopanna	6^{6}	2
13	(United States) S Lipsky (United States) R Ram	7^{8}	6
(Brazil) R Mello (Brazil) J Souza	4	3
7	(Sweden) R Lindstedt (Romania) H Tecău	6	6

Quarterfinals
13	(United States) S Lipsky (United States) R Ram	4	4
7	(Sweden) R Lindstedt (Romania) H Tecău	6	6

=== Bottom half ===
==== Section 3 ====
First round
8	(Pakistan) A-u-H Qureshi (Curaçao) J-J Rojer	6	7^{13}
(Croatia) I Ljubičić (Germany) C-M Stebe	3	6^{11}
(Brazil) T Bellucci (Brazil) M Melo	5	6^{7}
(Germany) P Marx (Canada) A Shamasdin	7	7^{9}
WC	(Australia) J Duckworth (Australia) A Feeney	2	6	6^{5}
(Italy) F Cipolla (Uzbekistan) D Istomin	6	3	7^{7}
Alt	(Portugal) F Gil (Spain) D Gimeno-Traver	6^{5}	6^{9}
10	(United States) E Butorac (Brazil) B Soares	7^{7}	7^{11}
14	(Italy) S Bolelli (Italy) F Fognini	5	6	6
(Portugal) R Machado (Czech Republic) L Rosol	7	4	2
(India) L Paes (Czech Republic) R Štěpánek	6	6
WC	(Australia) G Jones (Australia) J-P Smith	2	2
(Spain) M López (Spain) D Marrero	3	6	6
(Italy) A Seppi (Italy) S Vagnozzi	6	4	3
(Australia) J Kerr (United States) D Young	6^{6}	3
3	(France) M Llodra (Serbia) N Zimonjić	7^{8}	6

Second round
8	(Pakistan) A-u-H Qureshi (Curaçao) J-J Rojer	7^{10}	6
(Germany) P Marx (Canada) A Shamasdin	6^{8}	4
(Italy) F Cipolla (Uzbekistan) D Istomin	2	3
10	(United States) E Butorac (Brazil) B Soares	6	6
14	(Italy) S Bolelli (Italy) F Fognini	2	6^{5}
(India) L Paes (Czech Republic) R Štěpánek	6	7^{7}
(Spain) M López (Spain) D Marrero	3	2
3	(France) M Llodra (Serbia) N Zimonjić	6	6

Third round
8	(Pakistan) A-u-H Qureshi (Curaçao) J-J Rojer	4	2
10	(United States) E Butorac (Brazil) B Soares	6	6
(India) L Paes (Czech Republic) R Štěpánek	7	7^{7}
3	(France) M Llodra (Serbia) N Zimonjić	5	6^{2}

Quarterfinals
10	(United States) E Butorac (Brazil) B Soares	4	6^{4}
(India) L Paes (Czech Republic) R Štěpánek	6	7^{7}

==== Section 4 ====
First round
5	(Austria) J Melzer (Germany) P Petzschner	6	6
(Spain) N Almagro (Spain) P Riba	4	4
(Germany) D Brown (Croatia) I Dodig	1	4
(Argentina) JI Chela (Argentina) E Schwank	6	6
(United States) J Cerretani (Belgium) D Norman	6	4	6^{6}
(Argentina) C Berlocq (Argentina) L Mayer	3	6	7^{8}
(Spain) M Granollers (Poland) Ł Kubot	4	6^{1}
12	(Mexico) S González (Germany) C Kas	6	7^{7}
16	(Australia) P Hanley (United Kingdom) J Murray	6^{2}	6	6^{5}
(Austria) J Knowle (Germany) M Kohlmann	7^{7}	4	7^{7}
(Belgium) X Malisse (United Kingdom) K Skupski	6^{4}	3
(Italy) D Bracciali (Italy) P Starace	7^{7}	6
(Ukraine) S Stakhovsky (Russia) M Youzhny	4	5
(Colombia) JS Cabal (Colombia) R Farah	6	7
WC	(Australia) B Mitchell (Australia) M Reid	2	2
2	(Belarus) M Mirnyi (Canada) D Nestor	6	6

Second round
5	(Austria) J Melzer (Germany) P Petzschner	6	6
(Argentina) JI Chela (Argentina) E Schwank	2	4
(Argentina) C Berlocq (Argentina) L Mayer	6	6^{5}	1
12	(Mexico) S González (Germany) C Kas	4	7^{7}	6
(Austria) J Knowle (Germany) M Kohlmann	4	4
(Italy) D Bracciali (Italy) P Starace	6	6
(Colombia) JS Cabal (Colombia) R Farah	6^{0}	2
2	(Belarus) M Mirnyi (Canada) D Nestor	7^{7}	6

Third round
5	(Austria) J Melzer (Germany) P Petzschner	6^{1}	5
12	(Mexico) S González (Germany) C Kas	7^{7}	7
(Italy) D Bracciali (Italy) P Starace	6^{7}	2
2	(Belarus) M Mirnyi (Canada) D Nestor	7^{9}	6

Quarterfinals
12	(Mexico) S González (Germany) C Kas	1	7^{7}	2
2	(Belarus) M Mirnyi (Canada) D Nestor	6	6^{4}	6
