= 2012 Australian Open – Wheelchair women's doubles =

Wheelchair women's doubles
- 2012 Australian Open

Final
- Champion: (Netherlands) Esther Vergeer (Netherlands) Sharon Walraven
- Runner-up: (Netherlands) Aniek van Koot (Netherlands) Marjolein Buis
- Score: 4–6, 6–2, 6–4

Events
| Singles | men | women | | boys | girls |
| Doubles | men | women | mixed | boys | girls |
| WC Singles | men | women | quad |
| WC Doubles | men | women | quad |
| Legends | men | women | mixed |
| ← 2011 · | Australian Open | · 2013 → |

Defending champions Esther Vergeer and Sharon Walraven defeated Aniek van Koot and Marjolein Buis in the final, 4–6, 6–2, 6–4 to win the women's doubles wheelchair tennis title at the 2012 Australian Open.

The 2012 Australian Open – Wheelchair women's doubles is a tennis tournament featuring 8 paraplegic women tennis players, which is part of the NEC Tour. The tournament takes place at Melbourne Park in Melbourne, Australia, from 25 January to 28 January 2012, it is the 10th edition of the Australian Open women's wheelchair event and the first Grand Slam event of 2012. The tournament is played on Plexicushion Prestige AO hard courts, which is rated a medium-fast pace by the ITF. The competition is organised by the International Tennis Federation and Tennis Australia.

== Seeds ==
1. (Netherlands) Esther Vergeer / (Netherlands) Sharon Walraven (champions)
2. (Netherlands) Aniek van Koot / (Netherlands) Marjolein Buis (final)

== Draw ==
=== Key ===
- Q = Qualifier
- WC = Wild card
- LL = Lucky loser
- Alt = Alternate
- ITF = ITF entry
- PR = Protected ranking
- SR = Special ranking
- SE = Special exempt
- JE = Junior exempt
- JR = Junior Accelerator Programme entrant
- CO = College Accelerator Programme entrant
- NG = Next Gen Accelerator Program entrant
- w/o = Walkover
- r = Retired
- d = Defaulted

=== Finals ===
Semifinals
1 | (Netherlands) Esther Vergeer (Netherlands) Sharon Walraven | 6 | 6
(Germany) Sabine Ellerbrock (Japan) Yui Kamiji | 1 | 1
(Belgium) Annick Sevenans (Australia) Daniela Di Toro | 2 | 3
2 | (Netherlands) Aniek van Koot (Netherlands) Marjolein Buis | 6 | 6

Final
1 | (Netherlands) Esther Vergeer (Netherlands) Sharon Walraven | 4 | 6 | 6
2 | (Netherlands) Aniek van Koot (Netherlands) Marjolein Buis | 6 | 2 | 4
