= 2012 Australian Open – Wheelchair women's singles =

Wheelchair women's singles
- 2012 Australian Open

Final
- Champion: (Netherlands) Esther Vergeer
- Runner-up: (Netherlands) Aniek van Koot
- Score: 6–0, 6–0

Events
Singles	men	women		boys	girls
Doubles	men	women	mixed	boys	girls
WC Singles	men	women	quad
WC Doubles	men	women	quad
Legends	men	women	mixed
← 2011 ·	Australian Open	· 2013 →

Defending champion Esther Vergeer defeated Aniek van Koot in the final, 6–0, 6–0 to win the women's singles wheelchair tennis title at the 2012 Australian Open. She lost only four games en route to the title.

The 2012 Australian Open – Wheelchair women's singles was a tennis tournament featuring 8 paraplegic women tennis players, and part of the NEC Tour. The tournament took place at Melbourne Park in Melbourne, Australia, from 25 January to 28 January 2012, as the 10th edition of the Australian Open women's wheelchair event and the first Grand Slam event of 2012. The tournament was played on Plexicushion Prestige AO hard courts, which was rated a medium-fast pace by the ITF. The competition was organised by the International Tennis Federation and Tennis Australia.

== Seeds ==
1. (Netherlands) Esther Vergeer (champion)
2. (Netherlands) Aniek van Koot (final)

== Draw ==
=== Key ===
- Q = Qualifier
- WC = Wild card
- LL = Lucky loser
- Alt = Alternate
- ITF = ITF entry
- PR = Protected ranking
- SR = Special ranking
- SE = Special exempt
- JE = Junior exempt
- JR = Junior Accelerator Programme entrant
- CO = College Accelerator Programme entrant
- NG = Next Gen Accelerator Program entrant
- w/o = Walkover
- r = Retired
- d = Defaulted

=== Finals ===
Quarterfinals
1	(Netherlands) Esther Vergeer	6	6
(Belgium) Annick Sevenans	0	2
(Germany) Sabine Ellerbrock	6	7
(Japan) Yui Kamiji	1	5
(Australia) Daniela Di Toro	2	6^{3}
(Netherlands) Marjolein Buis	6	7^{7}
WC	(Netherlands) Sharon Walraven	4	2
2	(Netherlands) Aniek van Koot	6	6

Semifinals
1	(Netherlands) Esther Vergeer	6	6
(Germany) Sabine Ellerbrock	0	2
(Netherlands) Marjolein Buis	3	4
2	(Netherlands) Aniek van Koot	6	6

Final
1	(Netherlands) Esther Vergeer	6	6
2	(Netherlands) Aniek van Koot	0	0
