= List of Portugal Davis Cup team representatives =

This is a list of tennis players who have represented the Portugal Davis Cup team in an official Davis Cup match. Portugal has taken part in the Davis Cup since 1925.

== Players ==
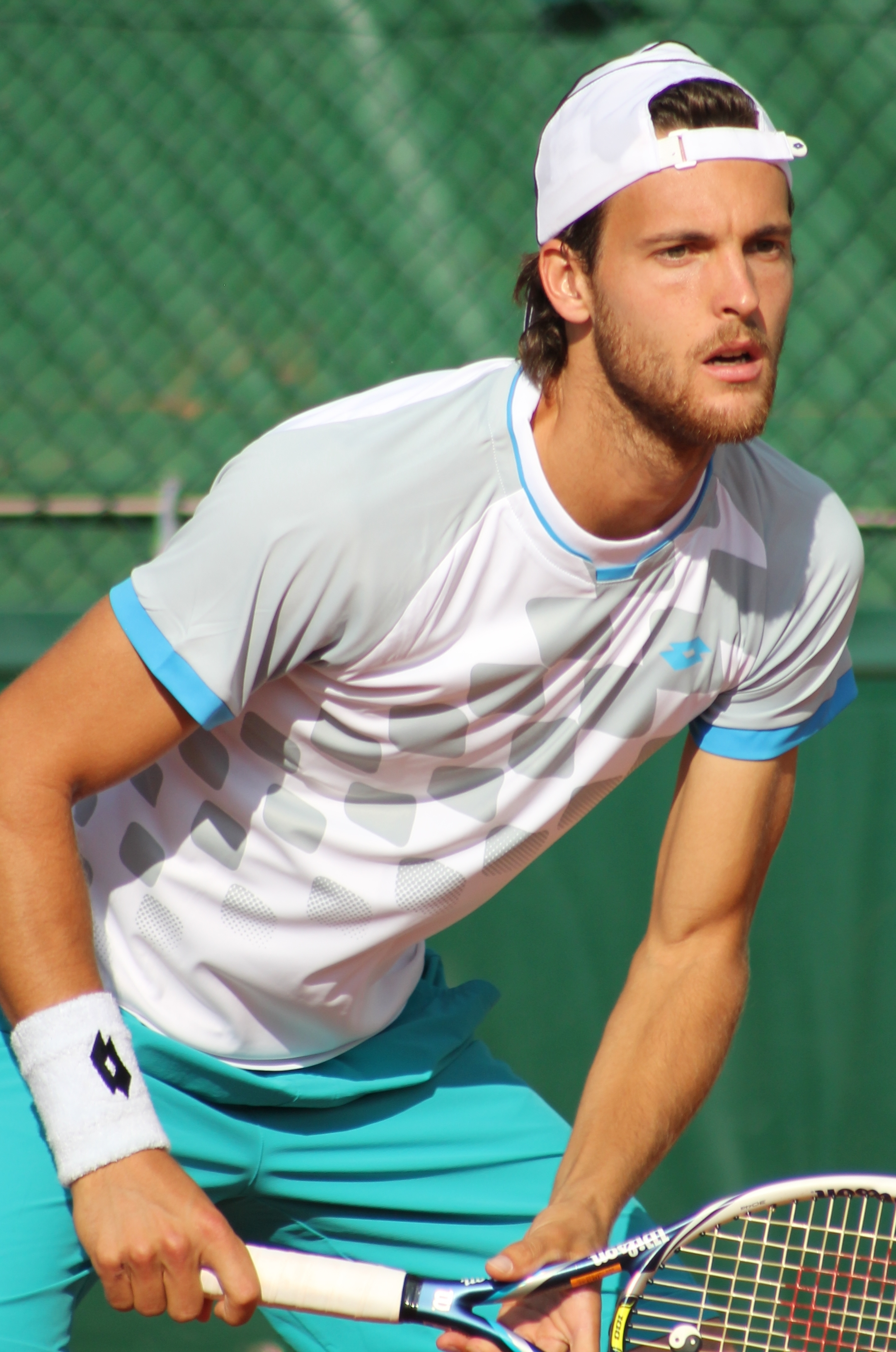
João Sousa

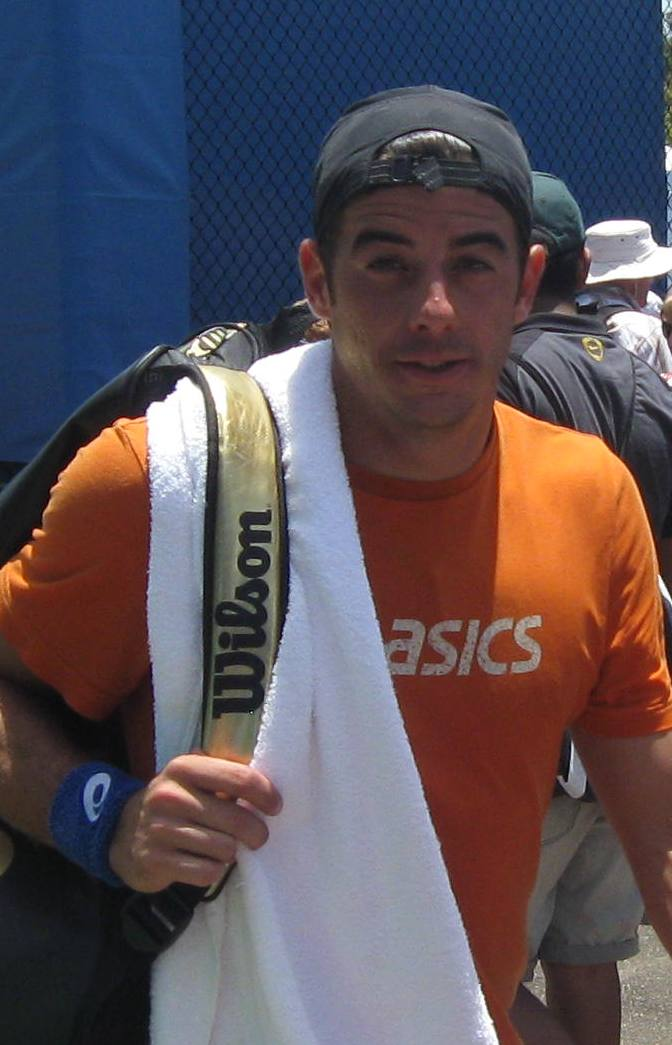
Frederico Gil

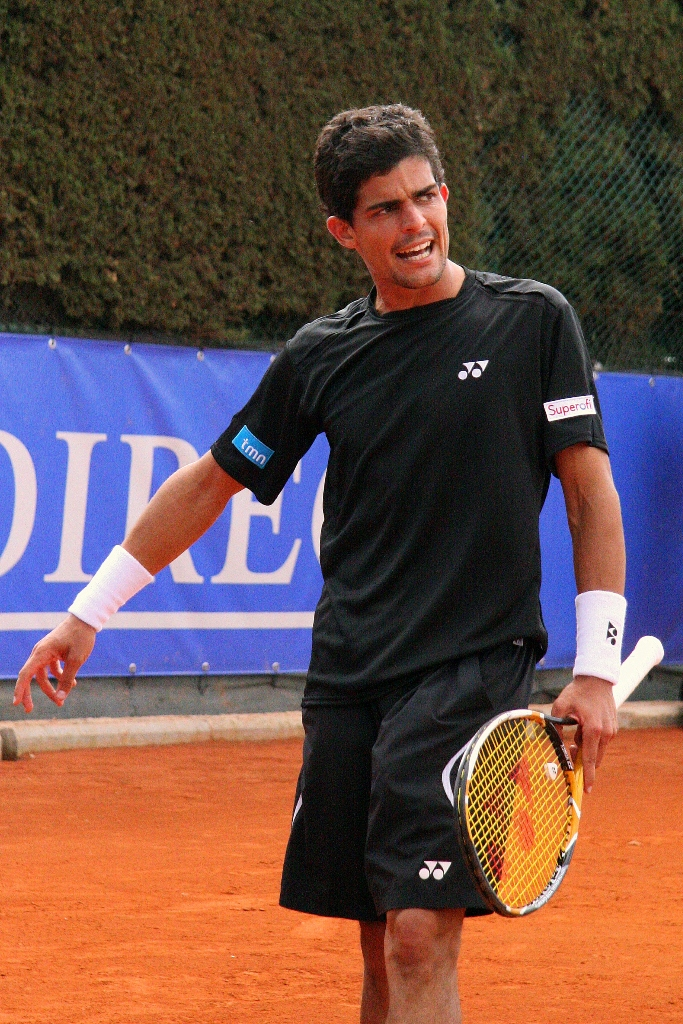
Rui Machado

Current through 2017 Davis Cup Europe/Africa Zone Group I Second round.

Name	First	Last	Ties	Singles		Doubles		Total		% won	Ref(s)
Name	First	Last	Ties	Won	Lost	Won	Lost	Won	Lost	% won	Ref(s)
António Azevedo Gomes	1955	1963	3	0	2	0	2	0	4	0%	
António Casanovas	1925	1928	4	1	5	0	3	1	8	11%	
David Cohen	1955	1964	3	1	5	0	0	1	5	17%	
José Manuel Cordeiro	1980	1983	3	0	4	0	3	0	7	0%	
Pedro Cordeiro	1980	1989	12	5	8	5	7	10	15	40%	
Emanuel Couto	1994	2003	20	11	10	13	5	24	15	62%	
Sérgio Cruz	1974	1978	5	1	8	0	1	1	9	10%	
João Cunha e Silva	1984	2000	30	25	28	12	12	37	40	48%	
Manuel Dinis	1963	1970	3	0	0	0	3	0	3	0%	
João Domingues	2015	2016	2	2	0	0	0	2	0	100%	
Gastão Elias	2007	2017	16	6	8	7	9	13	17	43%	
Frederico Ferreira Silva	2014	2017	5	3	2	1	0	4	2	67%	
Bruno Fragoso	1996	1999	2	1	1	0	0	1	1	50%	
André Gaspar Murta	2013	–	1	1	0	0	0	1	0	100%	
Frederico Gil	2004	2013	20	18	10	10	7	28	17	62%	
Tiago Godinho	2002	–	1	0	1	0	0	0	1	0%	
João Guedes	1982	–	1	1	0	0	0	1	0	100%	
João Lagos	1965	1975	7	3	8	0	3	3	11	21%	
André Lopes	1998	–	1	0	1	0	0	0	1	0%	
Hélder Lopes	2002	2003	5	2	3	0	1	2	4	33%	
Rui Machado	2003	2015	27	16	16	1	1	17	17	50%	
João Maio	1984	–	1	0	2	0	1	0	3	0%	
Nuno Marques	1986	2002	27	21	18	11	8	32	26	55%	
Arsénio Marta	1977	–	1	0	2	0	0	0	2	0%	
Bernardo Mota	1991	2004	18	10	11	6	3	16	14	53%	
Gonçalo Nicau	2006	2006	2	0	2	1	0	1	2	33%	
Raúl Peralta	1970	1976	8	5	4	1	6	6	10	38%	
António Pinto Coelho	1928	–	1	0	2	0	0	0	2	0%	
Eduardo Ricciardi	1948	–	1	0	2	0	1	0	3	0%	
Diogo Rocha	2005	–	1	1	0	0	0	1	0	100%	
João Roquette	1963	1969	7	0	2	0	6	0	8	0%	
José Roquette	1948	1949	2	0	4	0	1	0	5	0%	
Marco Seruca	1988	1988	2	0	2	0	0	0	2	0%	
José da Silva	1948	1955	3	0	4	0	3	0	7	0%	
Luís Filipe Silva	1978	–	1	0	1	0	1	0	2	0%	
Olívio Silva	1969	1971	2	0	2	0	0	0	2	0%	
Miguel Soares	1977	1982	4	1	4	1	2	2	6	25%	
João Sousa	2008	2017	21	19	9	7	6	26	15	63%	
Manuel de Sousa	1977	1983	4	1	3	0	1	1	4	20%	
Pedro Sousa	2006	2017	9	7	2	1	0	8	2	80%	
Leonardo Tavares	2002	2011	20	5	9	10	7	15	16	48%	
António van Grichen	2001	–	1	0	1	0	1	0	2	0%	
Fernando Vasconcelos	1925	1928	3	0	0	0	3	0	3	0%	
Alfredo Vaz Pinto	1963	1975	15	7	18	2	8	9	26	26%	
José de Verda	1925	1928	4	2	6	0	2	2	8	20%	
José Vilela	1971	1979	11	8	10	1	7	9	17	35%	
Tiago Vinhas Sousa	2001	–	1	0	2	0	0	0	2	0%	

== ITF Commitment Award ==
The following players have received the ITF Commitment Award from the International Tennis Federation for having competed in a minimum of 20 home or away ties or 50 ties at any level of the competition (including Zone Group Events) over their career.

- Emanuel Couto
- João Cunha e Silva
- Frederico Gil
- Rui Machado
- Nuno Marques
- João Sousa
- Leonardo Tavares
