= Rui Machado =

Portuguese tennis player (born 1984)

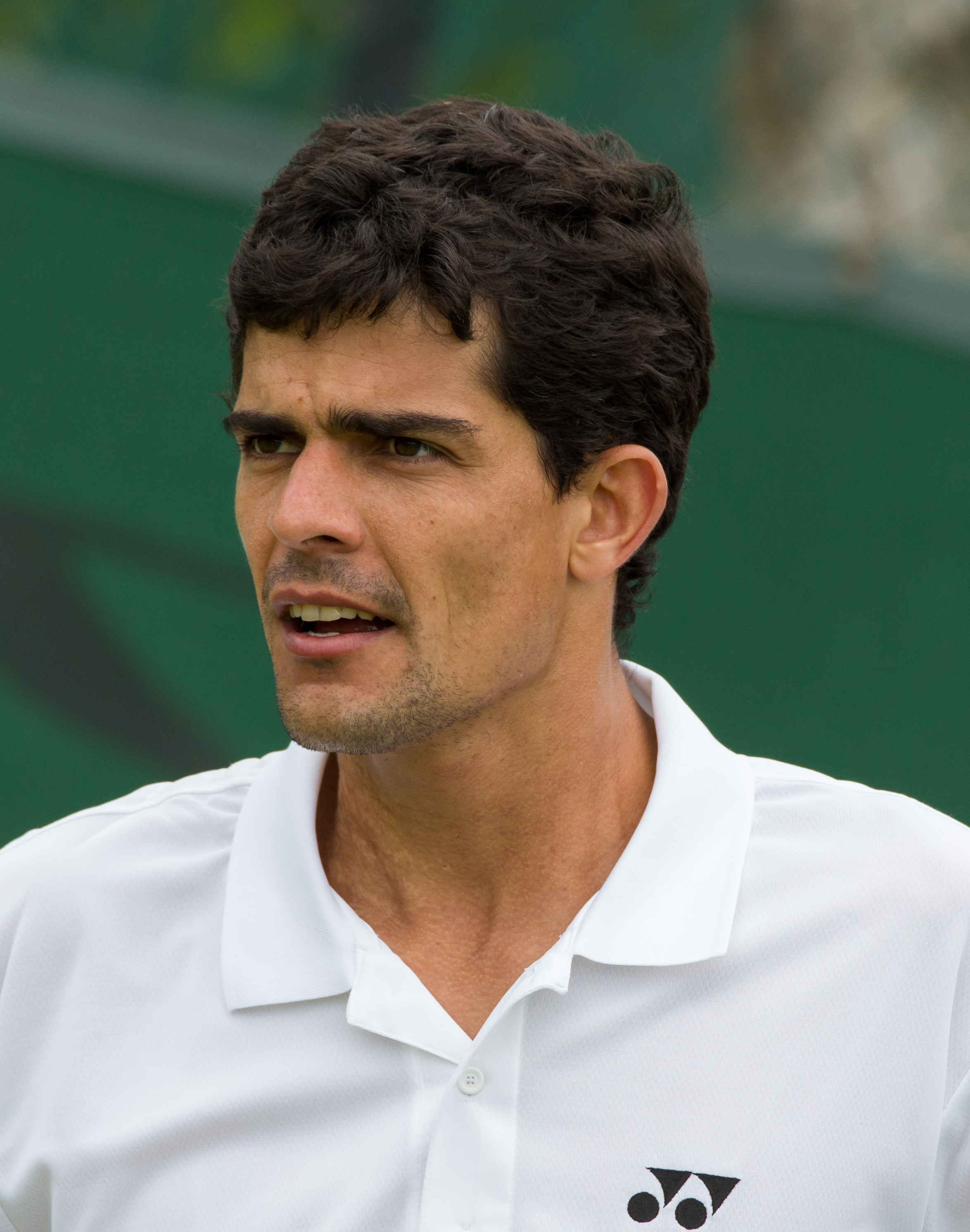
- Country (sports): Portugal
- Residence: Lisbon, Portugal
- Born: April 10, 1984 (age 41) Faro, Algarve, Portugal
- Height: 1.78 m (5 ft 10 in)
- Turned pro: 2002
- Retired: 2016
- Plays: Right-handed (two-handed backhand)
- Coach: André Lopes
- Prize money: $900,563

Singles
- Career record: 29–52 (Note: The official ATP records are incomplete as they do not count one Davis Cup loss against Serbia and Montenegro in 2004.)
- Career titles: 0
- Highest ranking: No. 59 (3 October 2011)

Grand Slam singles results
- Australian Open: 1R (2011, 2012)
- French Open: 2R (2009)
- Wimbledon: 1R (2012)
- US Open: 2R (2008)

Doubles
- Career record: 4–18
- Career titles: 0
- Highest ranking: No. 185 (17 January 2011)

Grand Slam doubles results
- Australian Open: 1R (2012)
- French Open: 1R (2012)
- Wimbledon: Q1 (2011)
- US Open: 2R (2011)
- Last updated on: N/A.

Rui Machado (born April 10, 1984) is a Portuguese retired professional tennis player. In October 2011, he achieved a career-high singles world ranking at 59, at the time the highest ranking a Portuguese player had ever held (since surpassed by João Sousa, Gastão Elias and Nuno Borges).

== Early life ==
At the age of six, Machado was first introduced to tennis when he attended lessons at a local club. He began participating in regional competitions, and five years later he was ranked no. 1 in the initiated players national ranking. In 1998, he was singles runner-up and team champion at the national juvenile championship, this time competing for the Faro Tennis Centre. One year later, Machado decided to attend a summer training camp of the Catalan Tennis Federation, in Barcelona. There he took the decision of pursuing a professional tennis career and with his family's help, he kept on training and finished his secondary education in Spain. Machado is of mixed heritage – Portuguese and Cape Verdean.

In 2001, he won the junior national singles championship and was runner-up for the Catalan regional singles title. In July, he earned his first ATP ranking point at a Spanish leg of the ITF Futures circuit. Despite being accepted to study economics at a Catalan university, Machado decided to concentrate his efforts on tennis and initiate a fully professional career.

== Career ==
=== 2002–2007 ===
Machado turned professional in 2002 and until 2005, Machado competed exclusively in the Futures circuit, where he collected two doubles titles. In April of that year, he entered his first ATP Challenger Series event in Olbia, Italy, ranked no. 322. Machado did not pass the first round, losing to ranked no. 245. Steve Darcis by 6–3, 6–3, but his first participation in an ATP Tour event soon followed, as he was selected to enter the Estoril Open, an ATP International Series event, with a wildcard, losing in the first round to ranked no. 94. Agustín Calleri by 4–6, 6–3, 6–1. He followed that with two straight Challenger quarterfinal runs in France and Italy, beating in the process former top-60 players Álex Calatrava 6–0, 6–1 and Juan Antonio Marín 6–4, 6–3. Peaking at a career-high no. 242 in October, Machado closed the year by reaching three consecutive Futures finals, and grabbing his first singles title and third doubles titles in Gran Canaria, Spain (although in different tournaments).

In early 2006, Machado suffered wrist and knee injuries. A nearly two-year competitive stoppage made him drop to an all-time low no. 1512, in July 2007, despite winning two more Futures doubles titles. Attempting to return to his previous level, Machado achieved modest results that helped him, nonetheless, to climb back to no. 733, at the end of 2007.

=== 2008 ===
Machado made his definitive comeback to high-level competition in early 2008 with an impressive winning streak of 26 consecutive matches in the Futures circuit. Along this run, he won four consecutive finals (Bari, Faro, Lagos, and Albufeira). He finally lost a semifinal match two weeks later in Zaragoza to no. 264 Pere Riba 7–5, 6–2, but avenged this loss in the following week in Loja, beating Riba in the final 6–3, 3–6, 6–1, for a fifth Future singles title in six consecutive tries and sixth overall. Machado would add yet another one in May, beating Antonio Pastorino in a hard-fought three-set final in Naples 6–4, 3–6, 7–6. This string of victories boosted Machado's ranking by 400 places to no. 328. In the meantime, he helped Portugal to a 4–1 defeat of Tunisia in their Euro/African Zone – Group II Davis Cup match in Estoril. The following week, he received a wildcard to the Estoril Open, but despite defeating world no. 22 Ivo Karlović 6–4, 1–0 ret. in the first round, Machado bowed out to no. 101 Florent Serra 7–6, 6–1.

The remainder of Machado's season included mostly participations in Challenger events, where his best record included two semifinal places in Cancún and Córdoba, but also his debut in Grand Slam qualification round matches. In June, he was unable to overcome the first qualifying round of Wimbledon against no. 383 Richard Bloomfield 6–3, 7–5, but later in August, he went through the qualification, defeating former Olympic champion no. 121 Nicolás Massú 6–2, 3–6, 6–3, in the process, to reach his first ever Gram Slam main round, where he would lose in a battled five-set second round match before no. 13 Fernando Verdasco 6–7, 7–6, 6–4, 6–7, 6–0. This participation earned Machado 100 points, his biggest share of ATP points in a single event, moving him up 22 places in the overall ranking to no. 178. He closed the year with a new career-high singles ranking of 153rd, achieving a net improvement of 529 places from his 2008 starting rank (732nd).

=== 2009 ===
A participation in the Costa do Sauípe 250 Series event opened Machado's new season. He survived the qualifying round and, in the main round, defeated world no. 75 Iván Navarro, 6–4, 6–1, only to lose in the next round to Eduardo Schwank, by two tiebreak-deciding sets after having won the first. In late February, Machado won his first Challenger-level tournament in Meknes, Morocco, surpassing no. 242 David Marrero, 6–2, 6–7, 6–3.

In March, he was unable to impose his game once again in Moroccan soil, at the Marrakech Challenger. Machado then tried to reach the main round of the Miami Masters but failed to go past the first qualifying round, losing to no. 110 Andrey Golubev. At the Athens Challenger, he earned his second Challenger singles title along with €12,250, his biggest career singles prize money and the biggest tournament won by a Portuguese player, defeating no. 168 Daniel Muñoz de la Nava by 6–3, 7–6 . In the doubles, he was losing finalist partnering with Jesse Huta Galung.

In May, in his third appearance at the Estoril Open, he lost his first round match 7–5, 1–6, 7–5 against no. 69 Óscar Hernández. He nevertheless reached an all-time high rank no. 123 and would soon manage to go through the 2009 French Open qualifiers and past the first round, only to be beaten by no. 12 seed Fernando González 6–3, 6–2, 6–3. Despite being eliminated in the first round of the Czech Open by eventual runner-up no. 90 Steve Darcis 6–4, 6–4, Machado climbed to a new lifetime best singles ranking of no. 116. He contested the qualifying tournament at Wimbledon, but lost in the second round to no. 201 Lukáš Lacko 1–6, 6–2, 8–6.

In July, Machado played for Portugal in the 2009 Davis Cup Europe/Africa Zone Group II. He recorded the largest win in tennis history, defeating Algeria's Valentin Rahmine 6–0, 6–0, 6–0.

In August, Machado qualified to the US Open as a lucky loser. He lost 6–2, 6–4, 2–6, 6–2 against no. 62 Daniel Köllerer.

=== 2010 ===
Machado began the season in the Australian Open qualifying tournament, where he lost in the second round 7–5, 6–3 to no. 300 Alex Bogomolov Jr.

In February, at the Brasil Open, in Costa do Sauípe, he upset no. 89 Marcos Daniel by 6–3, 7–6 and lost in the second round to no. 41 Igor Andreev by 6–3, 5–7, 6–4. Machado then tried to reach the main round of the Miami Masters but failed to go past the first qualifying round, losing to no. 155 Ivan Dodig by 7–6, 7–5. A week later he won the Naples Challenger defeating no. 204 Federico Delbonis 6–4, 6–4 in the final.

Machado entered the Estoril Open as a wildcard, in virtue of his low ranking, but he eventually achieved his career's best result by reaching the quarter finals. He paved his way by defeating higher ranked players: Nicolás Massú (92nd; 6–2, 6–4) and Michał Przysiężny (97st; 6–4, 6–4), losing only to his friend Frederico Gil (133rd; 4–6, 7–6, 6–3). With this successful campaign, on May 10, Machado climbed 6 places in the world rankings to become no. 108.

He contested the qualifying tournament at 2010 French Open, but lost in the second round to no. 245 Alexandre Sidorenko 7–6, 5–7, 6–3. He also contested the qualifying tournament at Wimbledon, but lost in the first round to no. 256 Tatsuma Ito 4–6, 6–3, 6–3 and in US Open he also lost in the second qualifying round to no. 220 Ryan Harrison 5–7, 7–6, 6–3.

In October, he won the Asunción Challenger defeating no. 138 Ramón Delgado 6–2, 3–6, 7–5 in the final.

=== 2011 ===
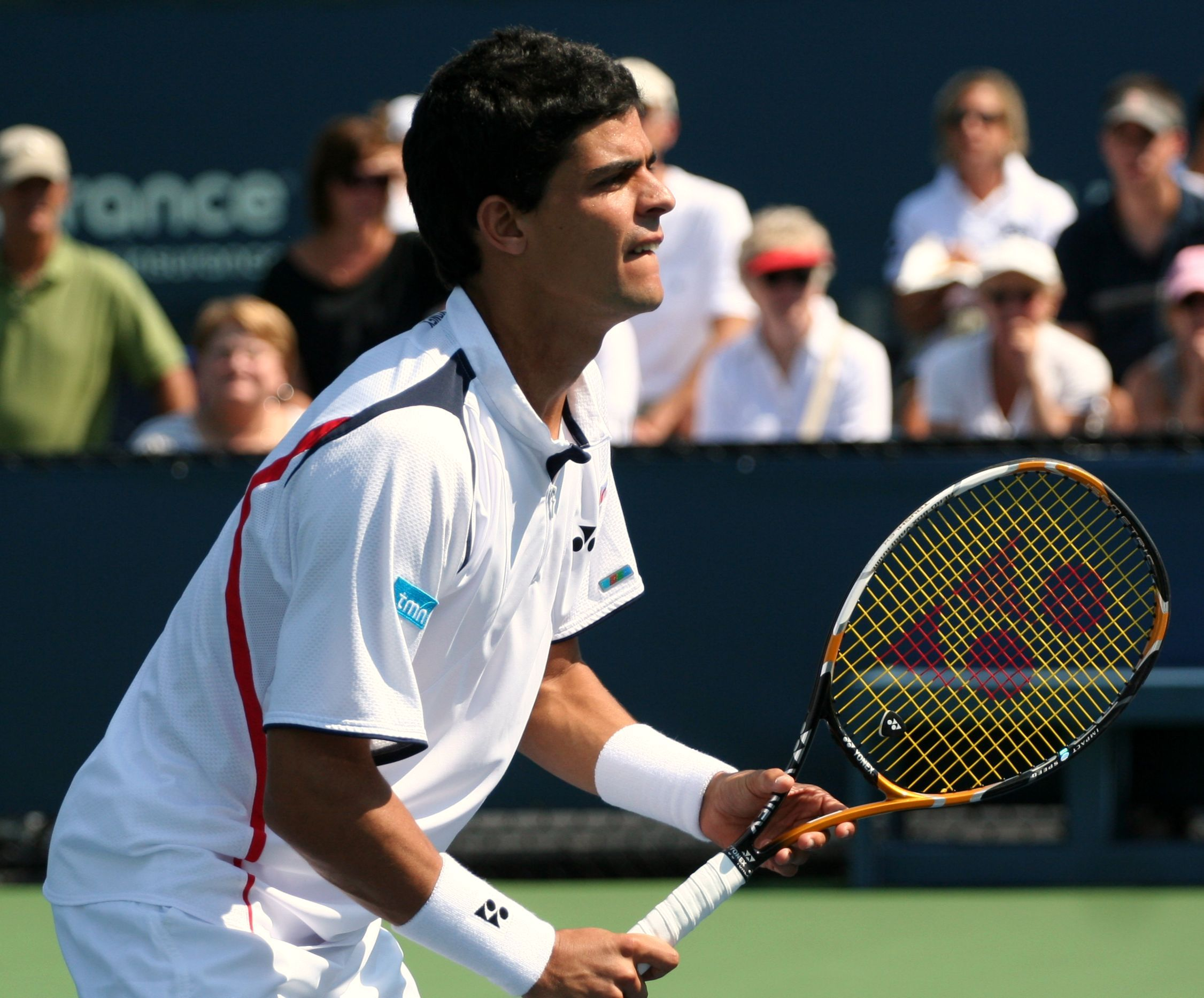
US Open 2011

Machado began the season losing in the Aircel Chennai Open in the first round to Alejandro Falla (105th) by 7–5, 6–3. Later at the Australian Open, he lost in the first round by 6–4, 6–3, 5–7, 6–1 to Santiago Giraldo (64th).

In February, at the Movistar Open, he lost in Second Round to no. 30 Thomaz Bellucci by 7–5, 1–6, 6–1. At the Brasil Open, in Costa do Sauípe, he upset no. 86 Filippo Volandri by 6–2, 6–1 and lost in Quarter Finals to no. 13 Nicolás Almagro by 6–2, 6–4. A week later, he lost in the first round of Copa Claro to no. 39 Juan Ignacio Chela by 4–6, 6–2, 6–2.

In March, he won the Marrakech Challenger defeating no. 267 Maxime Teixeira 6–3, 6–7, 6–4 in the final.

In April, in Casablanca, he lost in the first round to no. 103 Rubén Ramírez Hidalgo by 7–5, 6–1. Machado then tried to reach the main round of the 2011 Monte-Carlo Rolex Masters but failed to go past the first qualifying round, losing to no. 180 Bernard Tomic by 6–3, 6–7, 6–4. In Barcelona Open he achieved the second round as a lucky-loser where he lost to no. 48 Kei Nishikori by 6–1, 6–4. Machado entered the Estoril Open as a wildcard, in virtue of his low ranking, but he eventually qualified directly, for the first time, because of pre-tournament drop-outs. He lost in the first round to no. 63 Victor Hănescu by 6–3, 6–3.

In May, at the French Open he couldn't past the first round, he lost to no. 83 Julien Benneteau by 4–6, 6–1, 6–2, 6–0.

In June, he won the Rijeka Challenger defeating no. 154 Grega Žemlja 6–3, 6–0 in the final. He also contested the qualifying tournament at Wimbledon, but lost in the first round to no. 163 Robert Farah 4–6, 6–4, 6–2.

In July, he won the Poznań Challenger defeating no. 164 Jerzy Janowicz 6–3, 6–3 in the final. A week later, he lost in the first round of Croatia Open in Umag to no. 38 Fabio Fognini by 6–4, 6–3.

In August, he reached the semi-final in the Trani Challenger and he lost in the first round of US Open to the world no. 41 Robin Haase by 6–0, 6–4, 6–4 in 1h32m.

In September, he reached the quarter-finals in the Genova Challenger and he won the Szczecin Challenger defeating no. 104 Éric Prodon 2–6, 7–5, 6–2 in the final in 2h53m. In the semi-finals, he achieved the biggest win of his career winning the first seed of the tournament and world no. 54 Albert Montañés by 6–2, 0–6, 6–0 in 1h40m. After this, he broke the previous Portuguese singles ranking record by reaching the 61st position at the ATP rankings table. A day after he won the final, he arrived in Bucharest and he lost that same day in the first round of the Bucharest Open to no. 86 Filippo Volandri by 6–3, 6–3 in 1h25m. A week later he reached the semi-final in the Madrid Challenger. After this, he broke again his previous Portuguese singles ranking record by reaching the 59th position at the ATP rankings table.

In October, he reached the semi-finals in the São José do Rio Preto Challenger.

In November, he reached the semi-finals in the São Leopoldo Challenger. His last tournament of the season was the 2011 ATP Challenger Tour Finals in São Paulo, Brazil. It was the first edition of the event. Machado qualified as the leader of the ATP Challenger Tour ranking. In the first game, he defeated the no. 109 Matthias Bachinger by 3–6, 7–6^{(4)}, 6–4 in almost 3h. In the second game, he defeated the no. 95 Dudi Sela by 6–2, 6–2 in only 58m. In the last game of the round-robin group, Machado lost to no. 103 Cedrik-Marcel Stebe by 7–5, 6–0 in 1h23m. With this result Machado finish 3rd in his group with the same points of two others players qualified for the semi-finals and he was eliminated by game difference.

=== 2012 ===
Machado began the season losing in the Qatar Open in the first round to Gaël Monfils (16th) by 7–5, 6–3 in 1h21m. A week later, at Auckland he lost in the first round by 6–3, 7–6^{(3)} to Thomaz Bellucci (38th) in 1h43m. Later at the Australian Open, he lost in the first round by 6–1, 6–4, 6–2 to David Ferrer (5th) in 1h44m.

In February, Machado lost in the first round to the Spanish qualifier no. 128 Rubén Ramírez Hidalgo, the oldest player in the main draw at 34, by 6–3, 1–6, 6–2 in two hours in the Brasil Open, in São Paulo. A week later, he lost in the first round of Copa Claro to no. 12 Gilles Simon by 6–3, 7–5. The third-seeded Frenchman converted four of his nine break point opportunities against Machado to wrap up the victory in two hours and five minutes. A week later, at Abierto Mexicano Telcel he suffer his sixth consecutive lost in a first round of a tournament to no. 64 Jérémy Chardy by 7–6^{(4)}, 6–3 in 2h.

In March, at Indian Wells, Machado lost again in the first round to no. 92 Guillermo García López by 7–6^{(6)}, 4–6, 6–2 in 2h36m.

In April, at Casablanca, Machado lost again in the first round to the Spanish qualifier no. 544 Sergio Gutiérrez Ferrol by 6–2, 6–1 in 1h11m. A week later, he achieved the final of the Rome Challenger winning the first games of the season. In the final he lost in 2h45m to world no. 149 Roberto Bautista Agut by 6–7^{(9)}, 6–4, 6–3. A week later, at Barcelona Open he lost again in the first round to no. 102 Victor Hănescu by 6–3, 7–6^{(5)} in 2h1m.

In May, at the Estoril Open Machado improved to 1–10 on the year by beating in the first round wild card and friend no. 244 Pedro Sousa 6–7^{(3)}, 6–1, 6–2 in just over two hours, despite hitting eight double faults. He then lost in the second round to the top seed and world no. 12 Juan Martín del Potro who got his Estoril Open title defence off to a fine start with a 6–1, 6–0 victory in only 1h3m. Del Potro hit four aces and won 70 per cent of his service points. A week later, he achieved the semi-finals of the Roma Open. At the French Open he couldn't pass the first round, losing to no. 31 seed Kevin Anderson. The unheralded Portuguese player, who was 25 centimetres smaller than his opponent took Anderson to five sets, before losing by 7–6^{(2)}, 6–7^{(6)}, 4–6, 6–1, 11–9 in 4h50m in a match that was carried over from the previous day.

In June, at Wimbledon he couldn't pass the first round, losing to no. 126 Brian Baker by 7–6^{(2)}, 6–4, 6–0 in 1h54m.

In August, returning from injury, he lost in the first round of US Open to the world no. 26 Fernando Verdasco by 6–1, 6–2, 6–4 in 1h40m.

=== 2013 ===
Machado, started his year in February, after a long absence from injury, in Davis Cup against Alexis Klegou from Benim winning 2–6, 6–2, 6–0. He came back to the circuit, in a future in Vale do Lobo where he lost in the quarter finals. A week later, in a future in Loule, he achieved the final where he lost to Pedro Sousa by 5–7, 6–4, 7–6^{(3)}. A week later, in a future in Faro he defeated no. 308 and no. 1 seed Guillermo Olaso by 7–6^{(3)}, 6–2. A week later, in the fourth future in Portugal, Guimarães, Machado achieved the quarter-finals.

In April, in Davis Cup he won with Gastão Elias the doubles game that give Portugal the decisive point to win the tie in the second round against Lithuania by 6–3, 6–0, 6–2 in only 1h27m. He also played the Sunday match giving a 5–0 advantage against Lukas Mugevicius by 6–2, 6–0. Later, he enter in the qualifying of his favourite tournament the Estoril Open, and he defeats no. 249 Igor Andreev by 7–6^{(2)}, 6–1 in 1h31m. In the second round, he defeated world no. 385 Andis Juška by 6–1, 6–3 in 1h12m. Finally, in the third round, he qualified for the main draw by winning his match against 2nd seed and world no. 87 Thiemo de Bakker by 7–5, 6–2 in 1h15m. In the first round of the main draw, Machado lost to no. 54 Victor Hănescu by 6–4, 6–4 in 1h40m.

In June, Machado won a future in Romania beating in the final no. 286 and no. 1 seed Guillermo Olaso by 6–2, 6–0 in 1h. A week later, in a future in Italy he achieved the semi-finals.

In August, Machado won a future in Polonia beating in the final no. 508 and no. 6 seed Benjamin Balleret by 7–6^{(5)}, 6–1 and achieved 2 semi-finals in 2 futures in Polonia.

In September, in Davis Cup he won the last singles game that give Portugal the decisive point to win the tie in the third round against Moldova against Maxim Dubarenco by 7–5, 6–1, 6–3 and that allow Portugal to play in division I in the next year.

== Career Finals ==
=== ATP Challenger Tour ===
==== Singles: 10 (8 titles, 2 runners-up) ====
Legend ATP Challenger Tour (8–2)	Titles by surface Hard (1–0) Clay (7–2)	Titles by setting Outdoors (8–2) Indoors (0–0)

Outcome	Date	Category	Tournament	Surface	Opponent	Score
Winner	1 March 2009	Challenger	Meknes, Morocco	Clay	(Spain) David Marrero	6–2, 6–7^{(6–8)}, 6–3
Winner	12 April 2009	Challenger	Athens, Greece	Hard	(Spain) Daniel Muñoz de la Nava	6–3, 7–6^{(7–4)}
Runner-up	28 February 2010	Challenger	Meknes, Morocco	Clay	(Ukraine) Alexandr Dolgopolov	5–7, 2–6
Winner	4 April 2010	Challenger	Naples, Italy	Clay	(Argentina) Federico Delbonis	6–4, 6–4
Winner	17 October 2010	Challenger	Asunción, Paraguay	Clay	(Paraguay) Ramón Delgado	6–2, 3–6, 7–5
Winner	26 March 2011	Challenger	Marrakesh, Morocco	Clay	(France) Maxime Teixeira	6–3, 6–7^{(6–8)}, 6–4
Winner	5 June 2011	Challenger	Rijeka, Croatia	Clay	(Slovenia) Grega Žemlja	6–3, 6–0
Winner	24 July 2011	Challenger	Poznań, Poland	Clay	(Poland) Jerzy Janowicz	6–3, 6–3
Winner	18 September 2011	Challenger	Szczecin, Poland	Clay	(France) Éric Prodon	2–6, 7–5, 6–2
Runner-up	22 April 2012	Challenger	Rome, Italy	Clay	(Spain) Roberto Bautista Agut	7–6^{(9–7)}, 4–6, 3–6

==== Doubles: 3 (1 title, 2 runners-up) ====
Legend ATP Challenger Tour (1–2)	Titles by surface Hard (0–1) Clay (1–1)	Titles by setting Outdoors (1–2) Indoors (0–0)

Outcome	Date	Category	Tournament	Surface	Partner	Opponents	Score
Runner-up	12 April 2009	Challenger	Athens, Greece	Hard	(Netherlands) Jesse Huta Galung	(Australia) Rameez Junaid (Germany) Philipp Marx	4–6, 3–6
Winner	25 July 2010	Challenger	Póznan, Poland	Clay	(Spain) Daniel Muñoz de la Nava	(United States) James Cerretani (Canada) Adil Shamasdin	6–2, 6–3
Runner-up	30 October 2010	Challenger	São Paulo, Brazil	Clay	(Spain) Daniel Muñoz de la Nava	(Brazil) Franco Ferreiro (Brazil) André Sá	6–3, 6–7^{(2–7)}, [8–10]

=== ITF Men's Circuit ===
==== Singles: 28 (18 titles, 10 runners-up) ====
Category Futures (18–10)	Titles by surface Hard (8–7) Clay (10–3)	Titles by setting Outdoors (17–10) Indoors (1–0)

Outcome	Date	Category	Tournament	Surface	Opponent	Score
Runner-up	11 August 2003	Futures	Dénia, Spain F16	Clay	(Spain) José Antonio Sánchez de Luna	3–6, 2–6
Runner-up	6 December 2004	Futures	Gran Canaria, Spain F32	Clay	(Spain) Daniel Muñoz de la Nava	7–5, 6–7^{(7–9)}, 6–7^{(4–7)}
Runner-up	14 November 2005	Futures	Gran Canaria, Spain F32	Clay	(Slovakia) Ivo Klec	3–6, 3–6
Winner	27 November 2005	Futures	Gran Canaria, Spain F33	Clay	(Slovakia) Ivo Klec	2–6, 6–3, 6–3
Runner-up	12 December 2005	Futures	Pontevedra, Spain F34	Hard	(Spain) Gorka Fraile	1–6, 7–6^{(7–1)}, 6–7^{(3–7)}
Runner-up	27 March 2006	Futures	Faro, Portugal F3	Hard	(Portugal) Frederico Gil	6–7^{(4–7)}, 6–1, 4–6
Winner	25 February 2008	Futures	Bari, Italy F1	Clay (i)	(Germany) Daniel Stoehr	6–2, 6–3
Winner	3 March 2008	Futures	Faro, Portugal F4	Hard	(France) Frederic Jeanclaude	6–2, 2–6, 6–4
Winner	10 March 2008	Futures	Lagos, Portugal F5	Hard	(Netherlands) Thiemo de Bakker	6–4, 6–3
Winner	24 March 2008	Futures	Albufeira, Portugal F6	Hard	(Australia) Carsten Ball	6–2, 6–2
Winner	14 April 2008	Futures	Loja, Spain F13	Clay	(Spain) Pere Riba	6–3, 3–6, 6–1
Winner	26 May 2008	Futures	Naples, Italy F13	Clay	(Argentina) Antonio Pastorino	6–4, 3–6, 7–6^{(7–1)}
Runner-up	4 March 2013	Futures	Loulé, Portugal F2	Hard	(Portugal) Pedro Sousa	7–5, 4–6, 6–7^{(3–7)}
Winner	10 March 2013	Futures	Faro, Portugal F3	Hard	(Spain) Guillermo Olaso	7–6^{(7–3)}, 6–2
Winner	23 June 2013	Futures	Cluj-Napoca, Romania F4	Clay	(Spain) Guillermo Olaso	6–2, 6–0
Winner	18 August 2013	Futures	Bydgoszcz, Poland F3	Clay	(Monaco) Benjamin Balleret	7–6^{(7–5)}, 6–1
Winner	20 October 2013	Futures	Guimarães, Portugal F10	Hard	(Netherlands) Miliaan Niesten	5–7, 6–1, 3–0 ret.
Winner	27 October 2013	Futures	Guimarães, Portugal F11	Hard	(Belgium) Niels Desein	7–6^{(7–4)}, 6–3
Winner	6 April 2014	Futures	Lima, Peru F3	Clay	(Peru) Jorge Brian Panta	6–1, 6–2
Winner	26 October 2014	Futures	Ponta Delgada, Portugal F11	Hard	(Portugal) Frederico Ferreira Silva	6–2, 6–3
Winner	8 February 2015	Futures	Colombo, Sri Lanka F1	Clay	(Czech Republic) Jan Šátral	6–3, 6–3
Winner	15 February 2015	Futures	Colombo, Sri Lanka F2	Clay	(Serbia) Miljan Zekić	6–2, 6–1
Winner	21 February 2015	Futures	Colombo, Sri Lanka F3	Clay	(Serbia) Miljan Zekić	6–0, 6–3
Runner-up	1 March 2015	Futures	Vale do Lobo, Portugal F1	Hard	(France) Rémi Boutillier	4–6, 4–6
Winner	15 March 2015	Futures	Loulé, Portugal F3	Hard	(Belgium) Yannick Mertens	6–4, 7–6^{(8–6)}
Runner-up	4 April 2015	Futures	Doha, Qatar F1	Hard	(Czech Republic) Jaroslav Pospíšil	0–6, 5–7
Runner-up	11 April 2015	Futures	Doha, Qatar F2	Hard	(Switzerland) Adrien Bossel	3–6, 4–6
Runner-up	13 March 2016	Futures	Loulé, Portugal F3	Hard	(Portugal) Frederico Ferreira Silva	6–1, 3–6, 1–6

==== Doubles: 9 (5 titles, 4 runners-up) ====
Category Futures (5–4)	Titles by surface Hard (1–0) Clay (4–4)	Titles by setting Outdoors (4–4) Indoors (1–0)

Outcome	Date	Category	Tournament	Surface	Partner	Opponents	Score
Runner-up	4 August 2003	Futures	Dénia, Spain F15	Clay	(Egypt) Karim Maamoun	(Spain) Jordi Marse-Vidri (Spain) Daniel Muñoz de la Nava	7–6^{(7–1)}, 6–7^{(6–8)}, 4–6
Winner	23 August 2004	Futures	Vigo, Spain F18	Clay	(Uruguay) Martín Vilarrubí	(Spain) David Marrero (Spain) Carlos Rexach Itoiz	2–6, 6–3, 6–3
Winner	6 December 2004	Futures	Gran Canaria, Spain F32	Clay (i)	(Spain) David de Miguel	(Czech Republic) Dušan Karol (Spain) Roberto Menéndez	4–6, 7–5, 7–5
Winner	27 November 2005	Futures	Gran Canaria, Spain F33	Clay	(Spain) David de Miguel	(Spain) Pablo Andújar (Czech Republic) Dušan Karol	4–6, 6–4, 6–4
Winner	3 April 2006	Futures	Faro, Portugal F2	Hard	(Spain) Marcel Granollers	(Germany) Sebastian Fitz (Croatia) Franko Škugor	6–1, 6–1
Winner	9 July 2007	Futures	Málaga, Spain F24	Clay	(Portugal) Gonçalo Nicau	(Spain) Carlos Gonzalez-De Cueto (Spain) Sergio Pérez-Pérez	6–4, 6–0
Runner-up	25 February 2008	Futures	Bari, Italy F1	Clay	(Spain) Ignacio Coll-Riudavets	(Italy) Alberto Brizzi (Italy) Matteo Volante	4–6, 2–6
Runner-up	7 April 2008	Futures	Zaragoza, Spain F12	Clay	(Spain) Andoni Vivanco-Guzmán	(Spain) Guillermo Olaso (Spain) Albert Ramos	3–6, 4–6
Runner-up	7 February 2015	Futures	Colombo, Sri Lanka F1	Clay	(Spain) José Checa-Calvo	(Germany) Daniel Altmaier (Germany) Tom Schonenberg	7–6^{(8–6)}, 3–6, [9–11]

== Performance timelines ==
Key
W	F	SF	QF	#R	RR	Q#	P#	DNQ	A	Z#	PO	G	S	B	NMS	NTI	P	NH

(W) winner; (F) finalist; (SF) semifinalist; (QF) quarterfinalist; (#R) rounds 4, 3, 2, 1; (RR) round-robin stage; (Q#) qualification round; (P#) preliminary round; (DNQ) did not qualify; (A) absent; (Z#) Davis/Fed Cup Zonal Group (with number indication) or (PO) play-off; (G) gold, (S) silver or (B) bronze Olympic/Paralympic medal; (NMS) not a Masters tournament; (NTI) not a Tier I tournament; (P) postponed; (NH) not held; (SR) strike rate (events won / competed); (W–L) win–loss record.

=== Singles ===
Tournament	2003	2004	2005	2006	2007	2008	2009	2010	2011	2012	2013	2014	2015	2016	SR	W–L	Win %
Grand Slam tournaments
Australian Open	A	A	A	A	A	A	A	Q2	1R	1R	A	Q2	A	A	0 / 2	0–2	0%
French Open	A	A	A	A	A	A	2R	Q2	1R	1R	A	Q1	Q1	A	0 / 3	1–3	25%
Wimbledon	A	A	A	A	A	Q1	Q2	Q1	Q1	1R	A	Q1	Q1	A	0 / 1	0–1	0%
US Open	A	A	A	A	A	2R	1R	Q2	1R	1R	A	A	A	A	0 / 4	1–4	20%
Win–loss	0–0	0–0	0–0	0–0	0–0	1–1	1–2	0–0	0–3	0–4	0–0	0–0	0–0	0–0	0 / 10	2–10	17%
ATP World Tour Masters 1000
Indian Wells	A	A	A	A	A	A	A	A	A	1R	A	A	A	A	0 / 1	0–1	0%
Miami	A	A	A	A	A	A	Q1	Q1	A	A	A	A	A	A	0 / 0	0–0	N/A
Monte Carlo	A	A	A	A	A	A	A	A	Q1	A	A	A	A	A	0 / 0	0–0	N/A
Win–loss	0–0	0–0	0–0	0–0	0–0	0–0	0–0	0–0	0–0	0–1	0–0	0–0	0–0	0–0	0 / 1	0–1	0%
National representation
Summer Olympics	NH	A	Not Held			A	Not Held			A	Not Held			A	0 / 0	0–0	N/A
Davis Cup	Z2	Z2	Z2	Z1	Z1	Z2	Z2	Z2	Z1	Z1	Z2	Z1	Z2	A	0 / 13	16–16	50%
Career statistics
	2003	2004	2005	2006	2007	2008	2009	2010	2011	2012	2013	2014	2015	2016	SR	W–L	Win %
Tournaments	0	0	1	0	0	2	4	2	12	13	1	1	1	0	37		
Titles	0	0	0	0	0	0	0	0	0	0	0	0	0	0	0		
Finals	0	0	0	0	0	0	0	0	0	0	0	0	0	0	0		
Hard win–loss	0–1	0–1	0–0	1–1	0–1	1–2	0–2	0–0	0–4	0–6	1–0	1–0	1–0	0–0	0 / 10	5–18	22%
Clay win–loss	0–0	0–1	2–3	0–0	0–0	3–1	3–3	6–3	5–9	1–7	2–1	1–1	1–3	0–0	0 / 26	24–32	43%
Grass win–loss	0–0	0–0	0–0	0–0	0–0	0–0	0–0	0–0	0–0	0–1	0–0	0–0	0–0	0–0	0 / 1	0–1	0%
Carpet win–loss	0–0	0–0	0–1	0–0	0–1	0–0	Discontinued								0 / 0	0–2	0%
Outdoor win–loss	0–1	0–2	2–3	0–0	0–0	4–2	3–5	5–3	5–12	1–13	1–1	1–1	1–3	0–0	0 / 36	23–46	33%
Indoor win–loss	0–0	0–0	0–1	1–1	0–2	0–1	0–0	1–0	0–1	0–1	2–0	1–0	1–0	0–0	0 / 1	6–7	46%
Overall win–loss	0–1	0–2	2–4	1–1	0–2	4–3	3–5	6–3	5–13	1–14	3–1	2–1	2–3	0–0	0 / 37	29–53	35%
Win (%)	0%	0%	33%	50%	0%	57%	38%	67%	28%	7%	75%	67%	40%	N/A	35.37%		
Year-end ranking	486	393	259	893	733	153	124	93	68	306	255	291	320	891	$ 900,563		

=== Doubles ===
Tournament	2003	2004	2005	2006	2007	2008	2009	2010	2011	2012	2013	2014	2015	2016	SR	W–L	Win %
Grand Slam tournaments
Australian Open	Absent									1R	Absent				0 / 1	0–1	0%
French Open	Absent									1R	Absent				0 / 1	0–1	0%
Wimbledon	Absent								Q1	Absent					0 / 0	0–0	N/A
US Open	Absent								2R	Absent					0 / 1	1–1	0%
Win–loss	0–0	0–0	0–0	0–0	0–0	0–0	0–0	0–0	1–1	0–2	0–0	0–0	0–0	0–0	0 / 3	1–3	0%
National representation
Summer Olympics	NH	A	Not Held			A	Not Held			A	Not Held			A	0 / 0	0–0	N/A
Davis Cup	Z2	Z2	Z2	Z1	Z1	Z2	Z2	Z2	Z1	Z1	Z2	Z1	Z2	A	0 / 13	1–1	50%
Career statistics
	2003	2004	2005	2006	2007	2008	2009	2010	2011	2012	2013	2014	2015	2016	SR	W–L	Win %
Tournaments	0	0	1	0	0	1	1	1	5	5	0	1	1	1	17		
Titles	0	0	0	0	0	0	0	0	0	0	0	0	0	0	0		
Finals	0	0	0	0	0	0	0	0	0	0	0	0	0	0	0		
Hard win–loss	0–1	0–0	0–0	0–0	0–0	0–0	0–0	0–0	1–1	0–1	0–0	0–0	0–0	0–0	0 / 2	1–3	25%
Clay win–loss	0–0	0–0	0–1	0–0	0–0	0–1	0–1	0–1	0–4	2–4	1–0	0–1	0–1	0–1	0 / 15	3–15	17%
Grass win–loss	0–0	0–0	0–0	0–0	0–0	0–0	0–0	0–0	0–0	0–0	0–0	0–0	0–0	0–0	0 / 0	0–0	N/A
Outdoor win–loss	0–1	0–0	0–1	0–0	0–0	0–1	0–1	0–1	1–5	2–4	1–0	0–1	0–1	0–1	0 / 16	4–17	19%
Indoor win–loss	0–0	0–0	0–0	0–0	0–0	0–0	0–0	0–0	0–0	0–1	0–0	0–0	0–0	0–0	0 / 1	0–1	0%
Overall win–loss	0–1	0–0	0–1	0–0	0–0	0–1	0–1	0–1	1–5	2–5	1–0	0–1	0–1	0–1	0 / 17	4–18	18%
Win (%)	0%	N/A	0%	N/A	N/A	0%	0%	0%	17%	29%	100%	0%	0%	0%	18.18%		
Year-end ranking	651	472	426	1025	931	407	375	191	351	564	–	631	1476	–	$76,840		

== Head-to-head vs. Top 20 players ==
This section contains Machado's win–loss record against players who have been ranked 20th or higher in the world rankings during their careers.

Opponent	Highest rank	Matches	Won	Lost	Win %	Last match	Ref
Roger Federer (SUI)	1	1	0	1	0.00%	Lost (7–5, 3–6, 4–6, 2–6) at the 2011 Davis Cup	
David Ferrer (ESP)	3	1	0	1	0.00%	Lost (1–6, 4–6, 2–6) at the 2012 Australian Open	
Kei Nishikori (JPN)	4	1	0	1	0.00%	Lost (1–6, 4–6) at the 2011 Barcelona Open	
Juan Martín del Potro (ARG)	4	1	0	1	0.00%	Lost (1–6, 0–6) at the 2012 Estoril Open	
Fernando González (CHI)	5	1	0	1	0.00%	Lost (3–6, 2–6, 3–6) at the 2009 French Open	
Gaël Monfils (FRA)	6	1	0	1	0.00%	Lost (5–7, 3–6) at the 2012 Qatar Open	
Gilles Simon (FRA)	6	1	0	1	0.00%	Lost (3–6, 5–7) at the 2012 ATP Buenos Aires	
Fernando Verdasco (ESP)	7	2	0	2	0.00%	Lost (1–6, 2–6, 4–6) at the 2012 US Open	
Marcos Baghdatis (CYP)	8	1	0	1	0.00%	Lost (3–6, 5–7, 4–6) at the 2009 Davis Cup	
Nicolás Almagro (ESP)	9	1	0	1	0.00%	Lost (2–6, 4–6) at the 2011 Brasil Open	
Nicolás Massú (CHI)	9	1	1	0	100.00%	Won (6–2, 6–4) at the 2010 Estoril Open	
Kevin Anderson (RSA)	10	1	0	1	0.00%	Lost (6–7^{(2–7)}, 7–6^{(8–6)}, 6–4, 1–6, 9–11) at the 2012 French Open	
Fabio Fognini (ITA)	13	1	0	1	0.00%	Lost (4–6, 3–6) at the 2011 Croatia Open	
Jarkko Nieminen (FIN)	13	1	0	1	0.00%	Lost (1–6, 6–3, 4–6, 3–6) at the 2015 Davis Cup	
Ivo Karlović (CRO)	14	1	1	0	100.00%	Won (6–4, 1–0 ret.) at the 2008 Estoril Open	
Juan Ignacio Chela (ARG)	15	1	0	1	0.00%	Lost (6–4, 2–6, 2–6) at the 2011 ATP Buenos Aires	
Agustín Calleri (ARG)	16	1	0	1	0.00%	Lost (6–4, 3–6, 1–6) at the 2005 Estoril Open	
Igor Andreev (RUS)	18	1	0	1	0.00%	Lost (3–6, 7–5, 4–6) at the 2010 Brasil Open	
Dmitry Tursunov (RUS)	20	1	1	0	100.00%	Won (6–0, 6–0) at the 2014 Portugal Open	
Total		20	3	17	15.00%	Statistics correct as of 3 April 2017	

== Career earnings ==
Year	Majors	ATP wins	Total wins	Earnings	References
2003	0	0	0	$3,570	
2004	0	0	0	$8,989	
2005	0	0	0	$22,196	
2006	0	0	0	$2,361	
2007	0	0	0	$4,895	
2008	0	0	0	$80,594	
2009	0	0	0	$135,921	
2010	0	0	0	$112,742	
2011	0	0	0	$245,290	
2012	0	0	0	$175,840	
2013	0	0	0	$22,895	
2014	0	0	0	$45,185	
2015	0	0	0	$34,314	
2016	0	0	0	$4,441	
Career	0	0	0	$900,563	

== National participation ==
=== Davis Cup (17 wins, 17 losses) ===
Machado debuted for the Portugal Davis Cup team in 2003 and played 34 matches in 27 ties. His singles record was 16–16 and his doubles record was 1–1 (17–17 overall). His final participation was in the 2015 edition.

Group membership World Group (0–0) WG Play-off (0–0) Group I (4–5) Group II (13–12) Group III (0–0) Group IV (0–0)	Matches by surface Hard (4–9) Clay (13–6) Grass (0–0) Carpet (0–2)	Matches by Type Singles (16–16) Doubles (1–1)	Matches by Setting Indoors (6–6) Outdoors (11–11)	Matches by Venue Portugal (13–6) Away (4–11)

- ▲ ▼ indicates the result of the Davis Cup match followed by the score, date, place of event, the zonal classification and its phase, and the court surface.

Rubber result	Rubber	Match type (partner if any)	Opponent nation	Opponent player(s)	Score
▼0–5; 11–13 July 2003; Westridge Park, Durban, South Africa; Group II Europe/Africa Quarterfinal; Hard surface
Defeat	III	Doubles (with Leonardo Tavares)	South Africa	Chris Haggard / Robbie Koenig	5–7, 3–6, 2–6
Defeat	IV	Singles (dead rubber)	South Africa	Wesley Moodie	6–2, 1–6, 2–6
▲3–2; 9–11 April 2004; Centre National de Tennis, Tunis, Tunisia; Group II Europe/Africa First Round; Hard surface
Defeat	V	Singles (dead rubber)	Tunisia	Malek Jaziri	4–6, 3–6
▼0–5; 16–18 July 2004; Complexo Municipal de Tenis da Maia, Maia, Portugal; Group II Europe/Africa Quarterfinal; Clay surface
Defeat	IV	Singles (dead rubber)	Serbia and Montenegro	Dušan Vemić	3–6, 3–6
▲4–1; 4–6 March 2005; Kadrioru Tennis Center, Tallinn, Estonia; Group II Europe/Africa First Round; Carpet(i) surface
Defeat	IV	Singles (dead rubber)	Estonia	Andrei Luzgin	7–5, 4–6, 3–6
▲3–2; 15–17 July 2005; Estádio Nacional, Lisbon, Portugal; Group II Europe/Africa Quarterfinal; Clay surface
Defeat	I	Singles	Algeria	Slimane Saoudi	6–4, 0–6, 6–3, 6–7^{(3–7)}, 4–6
Victory	IV	Singles	Algeria	Lamine Ouahab	6–4, 6–2, 6–2
▲4–1; 23–25 September 2005; Clube de Tenis do Estoril, Estoril, Portugal; Group II Europe/Africa Semifinal; Clay surface
Defeat	II	Singles	Slovenia	Marko Tkalec	3–6, 6–4, 7–6^{(7–5)}, 1–6, 3–6
Victory	IV	Singles	Slovenia	Grega Žemlja	6–3, 6–3, 2–6, 6–4
▼1–4; 10–12 February 2006; National Tennis Centre, Esch-sur-Alzette, Luxembourg; Group I Europe/Africa First Round; Hard(i) surface
Victory	I	Singles	Luxembourg	Laurent Bram	7–5, 6–4, 6–2
Defeat	IV	Singles	Luxembourg	Gilles Müller	6–7^{(3–7)}, 6–7^{(2–7)}, 1–6
▼2–3; 9–11 February 2007; Tbilisi Sport Palace, Tbilisi, Georgia; Group I Europe/Africa First Round; Carpet(i) surface
Defeat	I	Singles	(Georgia (country)) Georgia	Irakli Labadze	5–7, 3–6, 6–7^{(3–7)}
▼0–5; 21–23 September 2007; Ahoy, Rotterdam, Netherlands; Group I Europe/Africa Relegation Play-off; Hard(i) surface
Defeat	V	Singles (dead rubber)	Netherlands	Jesse Huta Galung	3–6, 6–3, 2–6
▲4–1; 11–13 April 2008; Clube de Tenis do Estoril, Estoril, Portugal; Group II Europe/Africa First Round; Clay surface
Victory	I	Singles	Tunisia	Walid Jallali	6–1, 6–1, 7–5
▲5–0; 18–20 July 2008; Lawn Tennis Club da Foz, Porto, Portugal; Group II Europe/Africa Quarterfinal; Clay surface
Victory	II	Singles	Cyprus	Photos Kallias	6–4, 6–4, 7–5
▼0–5; 19–21 September 2008; Megaron Tennis Club, Dnipropetrovsk, Ukraine; Group II Europe/Africa Semifinal; Hard (i) surface
Defeat	II	Singles	Ukraine	Sergei Bubka	3–6, 6–3, 6–7^{(4–7)}, 4–6
▼2–3; 6–8 March 2009; National Tennis Centre, Nicosia, Cyprus; Group II Europe/Africa First Round; Hard surface
Defeat	II	Singles	Cyprus	Marcos Baghdatis	3–6, 5–7, 4–6
▲5–0; 10–12 July 2009; Office des parc Omnisport Wilaya d'Oran, Oran, Algeria; Group II Europe/Africa Relegation Play-off; Clay surface
Victory	I	Singles	Algeria	Valentin Rahmine	6–0, 6–0, 6–0
▲4–1; 5–7 March 2010; Complexo de Tenis da Maia, Maia, Portugal; Group II Europe/Africa First Round; Clay(i) surface
Victory	I	Singles	Denmark	Frederik Nielsen	4–6, 6–4, 6–0, 6–1
▲5–0; 9–11 July 2010; Centro de Tenis do Jamor, Cruz Quebrada, Portugal; Group II Europe/Africa Quarterfinal; Clay surface
Victory	I	Singles	Cyprus	Rareș Cuzdriorean	6–3, 6–0, 6–3
Victory	V	Singles (dead rubber)	Cyprus	Sergis Kyratzis	6–2, 6–0
▲3–2; 17–19 September 2010; Centro de Tenis do Jamor, Cruz Quebrada, Portugal; Group II Europe/Africa Semifinal; Clay surface
Defeat	II	Singles	Bosnia and Herzegovina	Aldin Šetkić	4–6, 3–6, 6–1, 1–6
▲4–1; 4–6 March 2011; Centro Desportivo Nacional do Jamor, Cruz Quebrada, Portugal; Group I Europe/Africa First Round; Clay surface
Victory	II	Singles	Slovakia	Martin Kližan	6–4, 6–4, 1–6, 2–6, 6–4
Victory	IV	Singles	Slovakia	Lukáš Lacko	6–4, 3–6, 6–4, 6–0
▼0–5; 8–10 July 2011; PostFinance-Arena, Bern, Switzerland; Group I Europe/Africa Quarterfinal; Hard(i) surface
Defeat	II	Singles	Switzerland	Roger Federer	7–5, 3–6, 4–6, 2–6
▼2–3; 6–8 April 2012; Canada Stadium, Ramat HaSharon, Israel; Group I Europe/Africa Quarterfinal; Hard surface
Defeat	II	Singles	Israel	Amir Weintraub	7–5, 3–6, 1–6, 5–7
▲5–0; 1–3 February 2013; Club Internacional de Football, Lisbon, Portugal; Group II Europe/Africa First Round; Clay(i) surface
Victory	IV	Singles (dead rubber)	Benin	Alexis Klegou	2–6, 6–2, 6–0
▲5–0; 5–7 April 2013; Club Internacional de Football, Lisbon, Portugal; Group II Europe/Africa Quarterfinal; Clay surface
Victory	III	Doubles (with Gastão Elias)	Lithuania	Mantas Bugailiskis / Lukas Mugevičius	6–3, 6–0, 6–2
Victory	V	Singles (dead rubber)	Lithuania	Lukas Mugevičius	6–2, 6–0
▲3–2; 13–15 September 2013; Manejul de Atletica Usoara, Chișinău, Moldova; Group II Europe/Africa Semifinal; Hard(i) surface
Victory	V	Singles	Moldova	Maxim Dubarenco	7–5, 6–1, 6–3
▼1–4; 12–14 September 2014; Olympic Stadium, Moscow, Russia; Group I Europe/Africa Relegation Play-off; Hard(i) surface
Victory	IV	Singles (dead rubber)	Russia	Konstantin Kravchuk	6–7^{(4–7)}, 6–4, 6–1
▲4–1; 6–8 March 2015; Centro Desportivo do Jamor, Cruz Quebrada, Portugal; Group II Europe/Africa First Round; Hard(i) surface
Victory	II	Singles	Morocco	Lamine Ouahab	6–2, 6–4, 6–4
▲4–1; 17–19 July 2015; Clube de Ténis de Viana, Viana do Castelo, Portugal; Group II Europe/Africa Quarterfinal; Clay surface
Defeat	II	Singles	Finland	Jarkko Nieminen	1–6, 6–3, 4–6, 3–6
▲3–2; 18–20 September 2015; Clube de Ténis de Viana, Viana do Castelo, Portugal; Group II Europe/Africa Semifinal; Clay surface
Defeat	V	Singles (dead rubber)	Belarus	Egor Gerasimov	7–6^{(7–3)}, 1–6, 4–6

== Awards ==
- 2013 – ITF Commitment Award

== See also ==
- Portugal Davis Cup team
