= 2012 Australian Open =

- Date: 16–29 January 2012
- Edition: 100th
- Category: Grand Slam (ITF)
- Surface: Hard (Plexicushion)
- Location: Melbourne, Victoria, Australia
- Venue: Melbourne Park

Champions

Men's singles
- (Serbia) Novak Djokovic

Women's singles
- (Belarus) Victoria Azarenka

Men's doubles
- (India) Leander Paes / (Czech Republic) Radek Štěpánek

Women's doubles
- (Russia) Svetlana Kuznetsova / (Russia) Vera Zvonareva

Mixed doubles
- (United States) Bethanie Mattek-Sands / (Romania) Horia Tecău

Wheelchair men's singles
- (Netherlands) Maikel Scheffers

Wheelchair women's singles
- (Netherlands) Esther Vergeer

Wheelchair quad singles
- (United Kingdom) Peter Norfolk

Wheelchair men's doubles
- (Netherlands) Ronald Vink / (Netherlands) Robin Ammerlaan

Wheelchair women's doubles
- (Netherlands) Esther Vergeer / (Netherlands) Sharon Walraven

Wheelchair quad doubles
- (United Kingdom) Andrew Lapthorne / (United Kingdom) Peter Norfolk

Boys' singles
- (Australia) Luke Saville

Girls' singles
- (United States) Taylor Townsend

Boys' doubles
- (United Kingdom) Liam Broady / (United Kingdom) Joshua Ward-Hibbert

Girls' doubles
- (United States) Gabrielle Andrews / (United States) Taylor Townsend
- Australian Open

The 2012 Australian Open was a tennis tournament that took place in Melbourne Park in Melbourne, Australia, from 16 to 29 January 2012. It was the 100th edition of the Australian Open, and the first Grand Slam event of the year. The tournament consisted of events for professional players in singles, doubles, and mixed doubles play. Junior and wheelchair players competed in singles and doubles tournaments.

Novak Djokovic successfully defended his title after he defeated Rafael Nadal in the longest Grand Slam final in history. The 2012 final passed the 2008 Wimbledon final for the record, finishing after 5 hours and 53 minutes of play. Kim Clijsters was the defending champion for the women's singles, but lost to Victoria Azarenka in the semifinals. Azarenka defeated Maria Sharapova for her first Grand Slam title; and over took Caroline Wozniacki as the number one ranked player on the WTA Tour. In the doubles Leander Paes and Radek Štěpánek won the title. Paes completed a career Grand Slam with the title while Štěpánek won his first Slam. On the women's side an all Russian duo of Svetlana Kuznetsova and Vera Zvonareva took the title. The mixed event was won by Bethanie Mattek-Sands and Horia Tecău.

== Tournament ==
The 2012 Australian Open took place in January 2012 at Melbourne Park. The men's singles was staged for the 100th time. There have been 59 different previous winners and the 100th staging of the event was marked by a special coin and the 2012 Champion received a special medallion. The tournament also marked 50 years since Rod Laver won his first Grand Slam. For the first time Hawk-Eye ball tracking system was used on the Margaret Court Arena, while Ken Fletcher was inducted into the Australian Tennis Hall of Fame.

== Points and prize money ==
=== Point distribution ===
Below is a series of tables for each of the competitions showing the ranking points on offer for each event.

==== Seniors points ====
Stage	Men's singles	Men's doubles	Women's singles	Women's doubles
Champion	2000			
Runner up	1200		1400	
Semifinals	720		900	
Quarterfinals	360		500	
Round of 16	180		280	
Round of 32	90		160	
Round of 64	45	0	100	5
Round of 128	10	–	5	–
Qualifier	25	–	60	–
Qualifying 3rd round	16	–	50	–
Qualifying 2nd round	8	–	40	–
Qualifying 1st round	0	–	2	–

==== Junior points ====
Stage	Boys singles	Boys doubles	Girls singles	Girls doubles
Champion	250	180	250	180
Runner up	180	120	180	120
Semifinals	120	80	120	80
Quarterfinals	80	50	80	50
Round of 16	50	30	50	30
Round of 32	30	–	30	–
Qualifier who loses in first round	25	–	25	–
Qualifying final round	20	–	20	–

==== Wheelchair points ====
Stage	Men's singles	Men's doubles	Women's singles	Women's doubles	Quad singles	Quad doubles
Champion	800					
Runner up	500					100
Semifinals/3rd	375	100	375	100	375	–
Quarterfinals/4th	100	–	100	–	100	–

=== Prize money ===
The 2012 Australian Open was the richest Grand Slam tournament in history, with the singles champions pocketing 2.3 million dollars. All prize money is in Australian dollars (AUD); doubles prize money is distributed per pair.

==== Men's and women's singles ====
- Winners: $2,300,000
- Runners-up: $1,150,000
- Semi-finalists: $437,000
- Quarter-finalists: $218,500
- Fourth round: $109,250
- Third round: $54,625
- Second round: $33,300
- First round: $20,000

==== Men's and women's doubles ====
- Winners: $454,500
- Runners-up: $227,250
- Semi-finalists: $113,000
- Quarter-finalists: $56,000
- Third round: $31,500
- Second round: $17,200
- First round: $9,600

==== Mixed doubles ====
- Winners: $135,500
- Runners-up: $67,500
- Semi-finalists: $33,900
- Quarter-finalists: $15,500
- Second round: $7,800
- First round: $3,800

== Events ==
=== Seniors ===
==== Men's singles ====
Novak Djokovic was the defending champion and won in the final 5–7, 6–4, 6–2, 6–7^{(5–7)}, 7–5 against Rafael Nadal entering the season as reigning world number 1 for the first time of his career. It was the longest match in the history of the Australian Open, and in fact, the longest ever singles final in the Open Era in Grand Slam history; clocked at 5 hours and 53 minutes and ending after midnight with Nadal memorable saying after the match "good morning." It marked the fifth Grand Slam of Djokovic's career and his 3rd Australian Open. It also marked the first time that he had defended a Grand Slam title. After winning the 2012 Australian Open, Djokovic had an opportunity to become the first man since Rod Laver in 1969 to hold all four Grand Slams at the same time, after winning the previous two in 2011. Nadal became the first player to lose in the final of three consecutive Grand Slams in the Open Era.

Championship match result (Serbia) Novak Djokovic defeated (Spain) Rafael Nadal, 5–7, 6–4, 6–2, 6–7^{(5–7)}, 7–5

==== Women's singles ====
Victoria Azarenka won her first Grand Slam title, becoming the first Belarusian player to win a Grand Slam in singles, by defeating Maria Sharapova in the final. She also became the 21st player to be ranked World No. 1 by the Women's Tennis Association on 30 January 2012 as a result of this win. It was Azarenka's 2nd title of the year and 10th of her career.

Championship match result (Belarus) Victoria Azarenka defeated (Russia) Maria Sharapova, 6–3, 6–0

==== Men's doubles ====
(India) Leander Paes / (Czech Republic) Radek Štěpánek defeated (United States) Bob Bryan / (United States) Mike Bryan, 7–6^{(7–1)}, 6–2

==== Women's doubles ====
(Russia) Svetlana Kuznetsova / (Russia) Vera Zvonareva defeated (Italy) Sara Errani / (Italy) Roberta Vinci, 5–7, 6–4, 6–3

==== Mixed doubles ====
(United States) Bethanie Mattek-Sands / (Romania) Horia Tecău defeated (Russia) Elena Vesnina / (India) Leander Paes, 6–3, 5–7, [10–3]

=== Juniors ===
==== Boys' singles ====
(Australia) Luke Saville defeated (Canada) Filip Peliwo, 6–3, 5–7, 6–4

==== Girls' singles ====
(United States) Taylor Townsend defeated (Russia) Yulia Putintseva, 6–1, 3–6, 6–3

==== Boys' doubles ====
(United Kingdom) Liam Broady / (United Kingdom) Joshua Ward-Hibbert defeated (Czech Republic) Adam Pavlásek / (Croatia) Filip Veger, 6–3, 6–2

==== Girls' doubles ====
(United States) Gabrielle Andrews / (United States) Taylor Townsend defeated (Russia) Irina Khromacheva / (Montenegro) Danka Kovinić, 5–7, 7–5, [10–6]

=== Other events ===
==== Wheelchair men's singles ====
(Netherlands) Maikel Scheffers defeated (France) Nicolas Peifer, 3–6, 7–6^{(7–2)}, 6–0

==== Wheelchair women's singles ====
(Netherlands) Esther Vergeer defeated (Netherlands) Aniek van Koot, 6–0, 6–0

==== Wheelchair quad singles ====
(United Kingdom) Peter Norfolk defeated (United States) David Wagner, 4–6, 6–4, 6–2

==== Wheelchair men's doubles ====
(Netherlands) Ronald Vink / (Netherlands) Robin Ammerlaan defeated (France) Stéphane Houdet / (France) Nicolas Peifer, 6–2, 4–6, 6–1

==== Wheelchair women's doubles ====
(Netherlands) Esther Vergeer / (Netherlands) Sharon Walraven defeated (Netherlands) Aniek van Koot / (Netherlands) Marjolein Buis, 4–6, 6–2, 6–4

==== Wheelchair quad doubles ====
(United Kingdom) Andrew Lapthorne / (United Kingdom) Peter Norfolk defeated (United States) David Wagner / (Israel) Noam Gershony, 6–4, 6–2

== Broadcast ==
The host broadcaster of the event was the Seven Network which ran all day and night coverage on its primary channel and its digital channel 7Two from 11 am until the close of play around midnight Melbourne time. 2012 is the first year Seven has aired live primetime play across the entire country, switching coverage to 7Two for various live news and Today Tonight broadcasts in different time zones of Australia. Associated media partnership Yahoo!7 (co-owned by Seven and Yahoo!) saw more than 100 000 viewers check into live match coverage via the Fango mobile app, with check-ins peaking during the Hewitt vs. Djokovic match in the Open's fourth round.

The event was also shown in Australia on Fox Sports which broadcast secondary matches live.

== Singles players ==
Men's singles

Champion		Runner-up	
(Serbia) Novak Djokovic [1]		(Spain) Rafael Nadal [2]	
Semifinals out
(United Kingdom) Andy Murray [4]		(Switzerland) Roger Federer [3]	
Quarterfinals out
(Spain) David Ferrer [5]	(Japan) Kei Nishikori [24]	(Argentina) Juan Martín del Potro [11]	(Czech Republic) Tomáš Berdych [7]
4th round out
(Australia) Lleyton Hewitt (WC)	(France) Richard Gasquet [17]	(Kazakhstan) Mikhail Kukushkin	(France) Jo-Wilfried Tsonga [6]
(Germany) Philipp Kohlschreiber	(Australia) Bernard Tomic	(Spain) Nicolás Almagro [10]	(Spain) Feliciano López [18]
3rd round out
(France) Nicolas Mahut	(Canada) Milos Raonic [23]	(Serbia) Janko Tipsarević [9]	(Argentina) Juan Ignacio Chela [27]
(France) Michaël Llodra	(France) Gaël Monfils [14]	(France) Julien Benneteau	(Portugal) Fred Gil
(Colombia) Alejandro Falla	(Chinese Taipei) Lu Yen-hsun	(Ukraine) Alexandr Dolgopolov [13]	(Croatia) Ivo Karlović
(South Africa) Kevin Anderson [30]	(Switzerland) Stanislas Wawrinka [21]	(United States) John Isner [16]	(Slovakia) Lukáš Lacko (Q)
2nd round out
(Colombia) Santiago Giraldo	(Japan) Tatsuma Ito (WC)	(Germany) Philipp Petzschner	(United States) Andy Roddick [15]
(Australia) James Duckworth (WC)	(Kazakhstan) Andrey Golubev (Q)	(Spain) Pablo Andújar	(United States) Ryan Sweeting
(France) Édouard Roger-Vasselin	(Russia) Alex Bogomolov Jr. [32]	(Serbia) Viktor Troicki [19]	(Brazil) Thomaz Bellucci
(France) Gilles Simon [12]	(Australia) Matthew Ebden	(Spain) Marcel Granollers [26]	(Brazil) Ricardo Mello
(United States) Mardy Fish [8]	(Spain) Pere Riba	(France) Florent Serra (Q)	(Slovenia) Blaž Kavčič
(Germany) Tobias Kamke	(United States) Sam Querrey	(Argentina) Carlos Berlocq	(Germany) Andreas Beck
(Belgium) Olivier Rochus	(Ukraine) Sergiy Stakhovsky	(Cyprus) Marcos Baghdatis	(Bulgaria) Grigor Dimitrov
(Argentina) David Nalbandian	(Italy) Flavio Cipolla	(United States) Donald Young	(Germany) Tommy Haas (PR)
1st round out
(Italy) Paolo Lorenzi	(Italy) Matteo Viola (Q)	(Italy) Potito Starace	(Czech Republic) Radek Štěpánek [29]
(Italy) Filippo Volandri	(Czech Republic) Lukáš Rosol	(Germany) Cedrik-Marcel Stebe	(Netherlands) Robin Haase
(Russia) Dmitry Tursunov	(Estonia) Jürgen Zopp (Q)	(Russia) Mikhail Youzhny	(Italy) Andreas Seppi
(United States) Michael Russell	(Russia) Igor Kunitsyn	(Germany) Matthias Bachinger	(Portugal) Rui Machado
(United States) Ryan Harrison	(Belgium) Xavier Malisse	(Latvia) Ernests Gulbis	(Spain) Daniel Gimeno Traver
(Spain) Juan Carlos Ferrero	(Spain) Guillermo García López	(Israel) Dudi Sela	(Australia) Marinko Matosevic (WC)
(Thailand) Danai Udomchoke (Q)	(Slovakia) Karol Beck	(Brazil) João Souza	(France) Stéphane Robert
(United States) Jesse Levine (WC)	(Croatia) Ivan Dodig	(Spain) Roberto Bautista Agut (Q)	(Uzbekistan) Denis Istomin
(Luxembourg) Gilles Müller	(Italy) Fabio Fognini	(Spain) Albert Montañés	(Argentina) Juan Mónaco [25]
(South Africa) Rik de Voest (LL)	(Belgium) Steve Darcis	(United Kingdom) James Ward (Q)	(France) Adrian Mannarino
(Australia) Greg Jones (WC)	(Romania) Victor Hănescu	(France) Kenny de Schepper (WC)	(Spain) Fernando Verdasco [22]
(Austria) Jürgen Melzer [31]	(Netherlands) Jesse Huta Galung (Q)	(France) Éric Prodon	(Russia) Alexander Kudryavtsev (Q)
(Spain) Albert Ramos Viñolas	(Germany) Björn Phau (Q)	(Ukraine) Illya Marchenko (Q)	(Denmark) Frederik Nielsen (Q)
(France) Benoît Paire	(Germany) Benjamin Becker (PR)	(France) Jérémy Chardy	(Poland) Łukasz Kubot
(Australia) Benjamin Mitchell (WC)	(Finland) Jarkko Nieminen	(Russia) Nikolay Davydenko	(Argentina) Leonardo Mayer
(Croatia) Ivan Ljubičić [28]	(Germany) Peter Gojowczyk (Q)	(United States) Denis Kudla (Q)	(United States) Alex Kuznetsov (Q)

Women's singles

Champion		Runner-up	
(Belarus) Victoria Azarenka [3]		(Russia) Maria Sharapova [4]	
Semifinals out
(Belgium) Kim Clijsters [11]		(Czech Republic) Petra Kvitová [2]	
Quarterfinals out
(Denmark) Caroline Wozniacki [1]	(Poland) Agnieszka Radwańska [8]	(Russia) Ekaterina Makarova	(Italy) Sara Errani
4th round out
(Serbia) Jelena Janković [13]	(China) Li Na [5]	(Czech Republic) Iveta Benešová	(Germany) Julia Görges [22]
(United States) Serena Williams [12]	(Germany) Sabine Lisicki [14]	(China) Zheng Jie	(Serbia) Ana Ivanovic [21]
3rd round out
(Romania) Monica Niculescu [31]	(United States) Christina McHale	(Slovakia) Daniela Hantuchová [20]	(Spain) Anabel Medina Garrigues [26]
(Germany) Mona Barthel	(Russia) Nina Bratchikova (Q)	(Italy) Romina Oprandi	(Kazakhstan) Galina Voskoboeva
(Russia) Vera Zvonareva [7]	(Hungary) Gréta Arn	(Russia) Svetlana Kuznetsova [18]	(Germany) Angelique Kerber [30]
(Romania) Sorana Cîrstea	(France) Marion Bartoli [9]	(United States) Vania King	(Russia) Maria Kirilenko [27]
2nd round out
(Georgia (country)) Anna Tatishvili	(France) Pauline Parmentier	(New Zealand) Marina Erakovic	(Chinese Taipei) Chang Kai-chen (Q)
(France) Stéphanie Foretz Gacon	(Ukraine) Lesia Tsurenko	(Belarus) Olga Govortsova	(Australia) Olivia Rogowska (WC)
(Australia) Casey Dellacqua (WC)	(Czech Republic) Petra Cetkovská [32]	(Italy) Alberta Brianti	(China) Peng Shuai [16]
(Italy) Francesca Schiavone [10]	(Greece) Eleni Daniilidou	(Bulgaria) Tsvetana Pironkova	(Argentina) Paula Ormaechea (Q)
(Czech Republic) Lucie Hradecká	(Estonia) Kaia Kanepi [25]	(Slovakia) Dominika Cibulková [17]	(Czech Republic) Barbora Záhlavová-Strýcová
(Israel) Shahar Pe'er	(United States) Sloane Stephens	(Canada) Stéphanie Dubois	(United States) Jamie Hampton (Q)
(Poland) Urszula Radwańska	(Russia) Nadia Petrova [29]	(Italy) Roberta Vinci [23]	(Australia) Jelena Dokić
(Russia) Anastasia Pavlyuchenkova [15]	(Netherlands) Michaëlla Krajicek	(Canada) Aleksandra Wozniak	(Spain) Carla Suárez Navarro
1st round out
(Australia) Anastasia Rodionova	(Australia) Ashleigh Barty (WC)	(Russia) Alla Kudryavtseva	(France) Alizé Cornet
(Czech Republic) Lucie Šafářová [24]	(France) Irena Pavlovic (Q)	(Croatia) Petra Martić	(United Kingdom) Laura Robson (Q)
(Portugal) Maria João Köhler (Q)	(United Kingdom) Elena Baltacha	(Netherlands) Arantxa Rus	(United States) Varvara Lepchenko (Q)
(Czech Republic) Eva Birnerová	(Austria) Patricia Mayr-Achleitner	(Sweden) Sofia Arvidsson	(Kazakhstan) Ksenia Pervak
(United Kingdom) Heather Watson	(Serbia) Bojana Jovanovski	(United Kingdom) Anne Keothavong	(Japan) Ayumi Morita
(Italy) Flavia Pennetta [19]	(United States) Irina Falconi	(France) Mathilde Johansson	(France) Aravane Rezaï (WC)
(Spain) Laura Pous Tió	(Belarus) Anastasiya Yakimova	(Japan) Kimiko Date-Krumm	(Slovenia) Polona Hercog
(Belgium) Yanina Wickmayer [28]	(India) Sania Mirza	(Romania) Simona Halep	(United States) Bethanie Mattek-Sands
(Romania) Alexandra Dulgheru	(Russia) Evgeniya Rodina	(Thailand) Tamarine Tanasugarn	(Sweden) Johanna Larsson
(Slovakia) Magdaléna Rybáriková	(Canada) Rebecca Marino	(France) Iryna Brémond	(Austria) Tamira Paszek
(Switzerland) Stefanie Vögele (Q)	(Australia) Isabella Holland (WC)	(Spain) Sílvia Soler-Espinosa	(South Africa) Chanelle Scheepers
(Australia) Bojana Bobusic (WC)	(Russia) Elena Vesnina	(Luxembourg) Mandy Minella	(Argentina) Gisela Dulko
(Australia) Samantha Stosur [6]	(United States) Alison Riske (Q)	(Russia) Valeria Savinykh (Q)	(Czech Republic) Andrea Hlaváčková
(Romania) Alexandra Cadanțu	(United States) Madison Keys (WC)	(Russia) Anna Chakvetadze (PR)	(France) Virginie Razzano
(Czech Republic) Klára Zakopalová	(Ukraine) Kateryna Bondarenko	(Germany) Kristina Barrois	(Spain) Lourdes Domínguez Lino
(Australia) Jarmila Gajdošová	(China) Zhang Shuai (WC)	(Romania) Irina-Camelia Begu	(Russia) Vera Dushevina

== Singles seeds ==
Seeds and Rankings are as of 9 January 2012 and Points are as of 16 January 2012.

=== Men's singles ===
Sd	Rk	Player	Points	Points defending	Points won	New points	Status
1	1	(Serbia) Novak Djokovic	13,630	2,000	2,000	13,630	Champion, won in the final against (Spain) Rafael Nadal [2]
2	2	(Spain) Rafael Nadal	9,595	360	1,200	10,435	Runner-up, Final lost to (Serbia) Novak Djokovic [1]
3	3	(Switzerland) Roger Federer	8,010	720	720	8,010	Semifinals lost to (Spain) Rafael Nadal [2]
4	4	(United Kingdom) Andy Murray	7,380	1,200	720	6,900	Semifinals lost to (Serbia) Novak Djokovic [1]
5	5	(Spain) David Ferrer	4,925	720	360	4,565	Quarterfinals lost to (Serbia) Novak Djokovic [1]
6	6	(France) Jo-Wilfried Tsonga	4,335	90	180	4,425	Fourth round lost to (Japan) Kei Nishikori [24]
7	7	(Czech Republic) Tomáš Berdych	3,700	360	360	3,700	Quarterfinals lost to (Spain) Rafael Nadal [2]
8	8	(United States) Mardy Fish	2,965	45	45	2,965	Second round lost to (Colombia) Alejandro Falla
9	9	(Serbia) Janko Tipsarević	2,655	45	90	2,700	Third round lost to (France) Richard Gasquet [17]
10	10	(Spain) Nicolás Almagro	2,380	180	180	2,380	Fourth round lost to (Czech Republic) Tomáš Berdych [7]
11	11	(Argentina) Juan Martín del Potro	2,315	45	360	2,630	Quarterfinals lost to (Switzerland) Roger Federer [3]
12	12	(France) Gilles Simon	2,005	45	45	2,005	Second round lost to (France) Julien Benneteau
13	14	(Ukraine) Alexandr Dolgopolov	2,030	360	90	1,760	Third round lost to (Australia) Bernard Tomic
14	15	(France) Gaël Monfils	1,970	90	90	1,970	Third round lost to (Kazakhstan) Mikhail Kukushkin
15	16	(United States) Andy Roddick	1,880	180	45	1,745	Second round retired against (Australia) Lleyton Hewitt [WC]
16	17	(United States) John Isner	1,800	90	90	1,800	Third round lost to (Spain) Feliciano López [18]
17	18	(France) Richard Gasquet	1,765	90	180	1,855	Fourth round lost to (Spain) David Ferrer [5]
18	19	(Spain) Feliciano López	1,755	45	180	1,890	Fourth round lost to (Spain) Rafael Nadal [2]
19	21	(Serbia) Viktor Troicki	1,595	90	45	1,550	Second round lost to (Kazakhstan) Mikhail Kukushkin
20	22	(Germany) Florian Mayer	1,630	45	0	1,585	withdrew due to hip strain
21	23	(Switzerland) Stan Wawrinka	1,615	360	90	1,345	Third round lost to (Spain) Nicolás Almagro [10]
22	24	(Spain) Fernando Verdasco	1,550	180	10	1,380	First round lost to (Australia) Bernard Tomic
23	25	(Canada) Milos Raonic	1,460	205	90	1,345	Third round lost to (Australia) Lleyton Hewitt [WC]
24	26	(Japan) Kei Nishikori	1,410	90	360	1,680	Quarterfinals lost to (United Kingdom) Andy Murray [4]
25	27	(Argentina) Juan Mónaco	1,335	45	10	1,300	First round lost to (Germany) Philipp Kohlschreiber
26	28	(Spain) Marcel Granollers	1,315	10	45	1,350	Second round lost to (Portugal) Frederico Gil
27	29	(Argentina) Juan Ignacio Chela	1,270	10	90	1,350	Third round lost to (Spain) David Ferrer [5]
28	30	(Croatia) Ivan Ljubičić	1,270	90	10	1,190	First round lost to (Slovakia) Lukáš Lacko [Q]
29	31	(Czech Republic) Radek Štěpánek	1,230	45	10	1,195	First round lost to (France) Nicolas Mahut
30	32	(South Africa) Kevin Anderson	1,190	10	90	1,270	Third round lost to (Czech Republic) Tomáš Berdych [7]
31	33	(Austria) Jürgen Melzer	1,170	180	10	1,000	First round lost to (Croatia) Ivo Karlović
32	34	(Russia) Alex Bogomolov Jr.	1,135	45	45	1,135	Second round lost to (France) Michaël Llodra

=== Withdrawn players (men's singles) ===
Rank	Player	Points	Points defending	New points	Withdrew due to
13	(Sweden) Robin Söderling	2,120	180	1,940	mononucleosis
20	(Croatia) Marin Čilić	1,665	180	1,485	patella tendon injury

=== Women's singles ===
Sd	Rk	Player	Points	Points defending	Points won	New points	Status
1	1	(Denmark) Caroline Wozniacki	7,485	900	500	7,085	Quarterfinals lost to (Belgium) Kim Clijsters [11]
2	2	(Czech Republic) Petra Kvitová	7,290	500	900	7,690	Semifinals lost to (Russia) Maria Sharapova [4]
3	3	(Belarus) Victoria Azarenka	6,865	280	2,000	8,585	Champion, won in the final against (Russia) Maria Sharapova [4]
4	4	(Russia) Maria Sharapova	6,440	280	1,400	7,560	Runner-up, Final lost to (Belarus) Victoria Azarenka [3]
5	5	(China) Li Na	5,570	1,400	280	4,450	Fourth round lost to (Belgium) Kim Clijsters [11]
6	6	(Australia) Samantha Stosur	5,585	160	5	5,430	First round lost to (Romania) Sorana Cîrstea
7	7	(Russia) Vera Zvonareva	5,435	900	160	4,695	Third round lost to (Russia) Ekaterina Makarova
8	8	(Poland) Agnieszka Radwańska	5,330	500	500	5,330	Quarterfinals lost to (Belarus) Victoria Azarenka [3]
9	9	(France) Marion Bartoli	4,710	100	160	4,770	Third round lost to (China) Zheng Jie
10	11	(Italy) Francesca Schiavone	4,040	500	100	3,640	Second round lost to (Italy) Romina Oprandi
11	12	(Belgium) Kim Clijsters	3,041	2,000	900	1,941	Semifinals lost to (Belarus) Victoria Azarenka [3]
12	13	(United States) Serena Williams	3,300	0	280	3,580	Fourth round lost to (Russia) Ekaterina Makarova
13	14	(Serbia) Jelena Janković	3,115	100	280	3,295	Fourth round lost to (Denmark) Caroline Wozniacki [1]
14	15	(Germany) Sabine Lisicki	2,903	(40)	280	3,143	Fourth round lost to (Russia) Maria Sharapova [4]
15	16	(Russia) Anastasia Pavlyuchenkova	2,795	160	100	2,735	Second round lost to (United States) Vania King
16	17	(China) Peng Shuai	2,760	280	100	2,580	Second round lost to (Czech Republic) Iveta Benešová
17	18	(Slovakia) Dominika Cibulková	2,695	160	100	2,635	Second round lost to (Hungary) Gréta Arn
18	19	(Russia) Svetlana Kuznetsova	2,646	280	160	2,526	Third round lost to (Germany) Sabine Lisicki [14]
19	20	(Italy) Flavia Pennetta	2,570	280	5	2,295	First round lost to (Russia) Nina Bratchikova [Q]
20	21	(Slovakia) Daniela Hantuchová	2,295	5	160	2,450	Third round lost to (Belgium) Kim Clijsters [11]
21	22	(Serbia) Ana Ivanovic	2,260	5	280	2,535	Fourth round lost to (Czech Republic) Petra Kvitová [2]
22	23	(Germany) Julia Görges	2,225	160	280	2,345	Fourth round lost to (Poland) Agnieszka Radwańska [8]
23	24	(Italy) Roberta Vinci	2,115	5	100	2,210	Second round lost to (China) Zheng Jie
24	25	(Czech Republic) Lucie Šafářová	2,120	160	5	1,965	First round lost to (United States) Christina McHale
25	26	(Estonia) Kaia Kanepi	2,049	100	100	2,049	Second round lost to (Russia) Ekaterina Makarova
26	27	(Spain) Anabel Medina Garrigues	1,950	5	160	2,105	Third round retired against (China) Li Na [5]
27	28	(Russia) Maria Kirilenko	1,930	100	160	1,990	Third round retired against (Czech Republic) Petra Kvitová [2]
28	29	(Belgium) Yanina Wickmayer	2,050	100	5	1,955	First round lost to (Kazakhstan) Galina Voskoboeva
29	30	(Russia) Nadia Petrova	1,765	160	100	1,705	Second round lost to (Italy) Sara Errani
30	31	(Germany) Angelique Kerber	1,810	5	160	1,965	Third round lost to (Russia) Maria Sharapova [4]
31	32	(Romania) Monica Niculescu	1,725	160	160	1,725	Third round lost to (Denmark) Caroline Wozniacki [1]
32	33	(Czech Republic) Petra Cetkovská	1,666	(18)	100	1,748	Second round lost to (Germany) Mona Barthel

=== Withdrawn players (women's singles) ===
Rank	Player	Points	Points defending	New points	Withdrew due to
10	(Germany) Andrea Petkovic	4,500	500	4,000	stress fracture

== Main draw wildcard entries ==
=== Men's singles ===
- (France) Kenny de Schepper
- (Australia) James Duckworth
- (Australia) Lleyton Hewitt
- (Australia) Marinko Matosevic
- (Australia) Benjamin Mitchell
- (Australia) Greg Jones
- (Japan) Tatsuma Ito
- (United States) Jesse Levine

=== Women's singles ===
- (Australia) Ashleigh Barty
- (Australia) Casey Dellacqua
- (Australia) Olivia Rogowska
- (Australia) Isabella Holland
- (Australia) Bojana Bobusic
- (United States) Madison Keys
- (France) Aravane Rezaï
- (China) Zhang Shuai

=== Men's doubles ===
- (Australia) James Duckworth / (Australia) Adam Feeney
- (Australia) Matthew Ebden / (Australia) Chris Guccione
- (Australia) Colin Ebelthite / (Australia) Marinko Matosevic
- (Australia) Lleyton Hewitt / (Australia) Peter Luczak
- (Australia) Greg Jones / (Australia) John-Patrick Smith
- (Australia) Benjamin Mitchell / (Australia) Matt Reid
- (Australia) Luke Saville / (Australia) Andrew Whittington

=== Women's doubles ===
- (Australia) Monique Adamczak / (Australia) Olivia Rogowska
- (Australia) Ashleigh Barty / (United Kingdom) Laura Robson
- (Australia) Stephanie Bengson / (Australia) Tyra Calderwood
- (Australia) Daniella Jeflea / (Australia) Viktorija Rajicic
- (Australia) Sacha Jones / (Australia) Bojana Bobusic
- (Australia) Tammi Patterson / (Australia) Storm Sanders
- (Australia) Sally Peers / (Australia) Isabella Holland

=== Mixed doubles ===
- (Australia) Ashleigh Barty / (Australia) Benjamin Mitchell
- (Japan) Kimiko Date-Krumm / (Japan) Kei Nishikori
- (Australia) Casey Dellacqua / (Australia) Matthew Ebden
- (Australia) Jelena Dokić / (Australia) Paul Hanley
- (Australia) Jarmila Gajdošová / (Brazil) Bruno Soares
- (Serbia) Jelena Janković / (Australia) Bernard Tomic
- (Australia) Olivia Rogowska / (Australia) Marinko Matosevic

== Protected ranking ==
=== Men's singles ===
- (Germany) Benjamin Becker
- (Germany) Tommy Haas

=== Women's singles ===
- (Russia) Anna Chakvetadze

== Qualifying entries ==
=== Men's singles ===
- (France) Florent Serra
- (Germany) Peter Gojowczyk
- (Thailand) Danai Udomchoke
- (Kazakhstan) Andrey Golubev
- (United Kingdom) James Ward
- (Netherlands) Jesse Huta Galung
- (Slovakia) Lukáš Lacko
- (United States) Denis Kudla
- (Estonia) Jürgen Zopp
- (Italy) Matteo Viola
- (Russia) Alexander Kudryavtsev
- (Spain) Roberto Bautista Agut
- (Denmark) Frederik Nielsen
- (United States) Alex Kuznetsov
- (Germany) Björn Phau
- (Ukraine) Illya Marchenko

The following players received as a lucky loser:

- (South Africa) Rik de Voest

=== Women's singles ===
- (United Kingdom) Laura Robson
- (France) Irena Pavlovic
- (Czech Republic) Andrea Hlaváčková
- (Switzerland) Stefanie Vögele
- (United States) Alison Riske
- (Portugal) Maria João Köhler
- (Argentina) Paula Ormaechea
- (Russia) Nina Bratchikova
- (Russia) Valeria Savinykh
- (Chinese Taipei) Chang Kai-chen
- (United States) Varvara Lepchenko
- (United States) Jamie Hampton

=== Withdrawals ===
The following players were accepted directly into the main tournament, but withdrew with injuries.

==== Men's singles ====
Original player	Replacement
(Germany) Michael Berrer	(France) Édouard Roger-Vasselin
(United States) James Blake	(Brazil) João Souza
(Croatia) Marin Čilić	(Portugal) Frederico Gil
(India) Somdev Devvarman	(Italy) Paolo Lorenzi
(Chile) Fernando González	(France) Jérémy Chardy
(France) Paul-Henri Mathieu	(France) Stéphane Robert
(Germany) Florian Mayer	(South Africa) Rik de Voest
(Spain) Tommy Robredo	(Spain) Daniel Gimeno Traver
(Sweden) Robin Söderling	(Slovakia) Karol Beck

==== Women's singles ====
Original player	Replacement
(Switzerland) Timea Bacsinszky	(Canada) Aleksandra Wozniak
(Russia) Alisa Kleybanova	(Poland) Urszula Radwańska
(Spain) María José Martínez Sánchez	(Ukraine) Lesia Tsurenko
(Germany) Andrea Petkovic	(Belarus) Olga Govortsova
(Latvia) Anastasija Sevastova	(Australia) Anastasia Rodionova
(United States) Venus Williams	(Luxembourg) Mandy Minella

=== Juniors ===
Below is a list of the sixteen seeds for the boys and girls singles and the eight qualifiers for each event.

==== Singles seeds ====
===== Boys' singles =====
Sd	Player
1	(Australia) Luke Saville
2	(Brazil) Thiago Monteiro
3	(United Kingdom) Liam Broady
4	(Japan) Kaichi Uchida
5	(Portugal) Frederico Ferreira Silva
6	(Australia) Andrew Harris
7	(United Kingdom) Kyle Edmund
8	(Italy) Stefano Napolitano
9	(Serbia) Nikola Milojević
10	(Czech Republic) Adam Pavlásek
11	(Belgium) Kimmer Coppejans
12	(Belgium) Julien Cagnina
13	(Australia) Nick Kyrgios
14	(United States) Connor Farren
15	(Finland) Herkko Pöllänen
16	(Egypt) Karim Hossam

===== Girls' singles =====
Sd	Player
1	(Russia) Irina Khromacheva
2	(Canada) Eugenie Bouchard
3	(Estonia) Anett Kontaveit
4	(Russia) Yulia Putintseva
5	(Netherlands) Indy de Vroome
6	(Russia) Elizaveta Kulichkova
7	(Montenegro) Danka Kovinić
8	(Slovakia) Anna Karolína Schmiedlová
9	(China) Zheng Saisai
10	(Romania) Ilka Csöregi
11	(Poland) Zuzanna Maciejewska
12	(Uzbekistan) Sabina Sharipova
13	(Croatia) Donna Vekić
14	(United States) Taylor Townsend
15	(Russia) Varvara Flink
16	(United States) Kyle McPhillips

=== Wheelchair tennis ===
The field consisted of top seven ranked players in the men's and women's singles, the three top three ranked players in the quad singles category and one wildcard was chosen for each draw.

==== Singles seeds ====
===== Men's singles =====
- (Netherlands) Maikel Scheffers (1)
- (France) Stéphane Houdet (2)

===== Women =====
- (Netherlands) Esther Vergeer (1)
- (Netherlands) Aniek van Koot (2)

===== Quad =====
- (United States) David Wagner (1)
- (United Kingdom) Peter Norfolk (2)

Preceded by 2011 US Open	Grand Slams	Succeeded by 2012 French Open
