= 2006 Davis Cup Europe/Africa Zone Group I =

International tennis competition

The European and African Zone was one of the three zones of regional Davis Cup competition in 2006.

In the European and African Zone there were four different groups in which teams compete against each other to advance to the next group.

== Participating teams ==
- Belgium
- Czech Republic
- Great Britain
- Israel
- Italy
- Luxembourg
- Morocco
- Portugal
- Serbia and Montenegro
- Ukraine

== Draw ==
Second Round Play-offs
Marrakesh, Morocco (clay)
Morocco	2
Portugal	3
Odesa, Ukraine (clay)
4	Great Britain	3
Ukraine	2

First Round Play-offs
Morocco
bye
bye
Portugal
Eastbourne, UK (grass)
Israel	3
4	Great Britain	2
Ukraine
bye

First round
1	Czech Republic
bye
Morocco
bye
3	Italy
bye
Esch/Alzette, Luxembourg (indoor hard)
Portugal	1
Luxembourg	4
Ramat Hasharon, Israel (hard)
Israel	1
Serbia and Montenegro	4
bye
4	Great Britain
bye
Ukraine
bye
2	Belgium

Second round
Oujda, Morocco (clay)
1	Czech Republic	5
Morocco	0
Torre del Greco, Italy (clay)
3	Italy	5
Luxembourg	0
Glasgow, UK (indoor carpet)
Serbia and Montenegro	3
4	Great Britain	2
Kyiv, Ukraine (indoor carpet)
Ukraine	1
2	Belgium	4

- Morocco and Ukraine relegated to Group II in 2007.
- Czech Republic, Italy, Serbia and Montenegro, and Belgium advance to World Group Play-off.

== First Round Matches ==
=== Luxembourg vs. Portugal ===
Luxembourg
4
National Tennis Centre, Esch-sur-Alzette, Luxembourg
10–12 February 2006
Hard (indoor)

Portugal
1

			1	2	3	4	5
1	(Luxembourg) (Portugal)	Laurent Bram; Rui Machado	5; 7	4; 6	2; 6
2	(Luxembourg) (Portugal)	Gilles Müller; Frederico Gil	6; 2	6; 1	6; 4
3	(Luxembourg) (Portugal)	Gilles Müller / Mike Scheidweiler; Frederico Gil / Leonardo Tavares	4; 6	6; 3	7; 5	6; 1
4	(Luxembourg) (Portugal)	Gilles Müller; Rui Machado	7^{7} 6^{3}	7^{7} 6^{2}	6; 1
5	(Luxembourg) (Portugal)	Gilles Kremer; Gonçalo Nicau	6^{8} 7^{10}	6; 4	6; 4

=== Israel vs. Serbia and Montenegro ===
Israel
1
Canada Stadium, Ramat HaSharon, Israel
10–12 February 2006
Hard

Serbia and Montenegro
4

			1	2	3	4	5
1	(Israel) (Serbia and Montenegro)	Dudi Sela; Janko Tipsarević	6^{3} 7^{7}	6; 2	0; 6	4; 6
2	(Israel) (Serbia and Montenegro)	Noam Okun; Novak Djokovic	6^{2} 7^{7}	6^{6} 7^{8}	2; 6
3	(Israel) (Serbia and Montenegro)	Jonathan Erlich / Andy Ram; Ilija Bozoljac / Janko Tipsarević	6; 3	6; 2	6; 4
4	(Israel) (Serbia and Montenegro)	Dudi Sela; Novak Djokovic	1; 6	2; 6	6^{3} 7^{7}
5	(Israel) (Serbia and Montenegro)	Noam Okun; Janko Tipsarević	6^{10} 7^{12}	4; 6

== Second Round Matches ==
=== Morocco vs. Czech Republic ===
Morocco
0
Oujda, Morocco
7–9 April 2006
Clay

Czech Republic
5

			1	2	3	4	5
1	(Morocco) (Czech Republic)	Mounir El Aarej; Tomáš Zíb	6; 2	1; 6	5; 7	4; 6
2	(Morocco) (Czech Republic)	Mehdi Tahiri; Tomáš Berdych	3; 6	1; 6	2; 6
3	(Morocco) (Czech Republic)	Talal Ouahabi / Mehdi Ziadi; Tomáš Berdych / Lukáš Dlouhý	3; 6	2; 6	3; 6
4	(Morocco) (Czech Republic)	Mehdi Ziadi; Lukáš Dlouhý	2; 6	1; 6
5	(Morocco) (Czech Republic)	Mehdi Tahiri; Tomáš Zíb	4; 6	5; 7

=== Italy vs. Luxembourg ===
Italy
5
Sporting Club Oplonti, Torre del Greco, Italy
7–9 April 2006
Clay

Luxembourg
0

			1	2	3	4	5
1	(Italy) (Luxembourg)	Filippo Volandri; Gilles Kremer	6; 2	6; 1	6; 2
2	(Italy) (Luxembourg)	Andreas Seppi; Laurent Bram	6; 2	6; 1	6; 3
3	(Italy) (Luxembourg)	Daniele Bracciali / Giorgio Galimberti; Laurent Bram / Gilles Kremer	6; 3	6; 2	6; 4
4	(Italy) (Luxembourg)	Filippo Volandri; Laurent Bram	6; 3	6; 1
5	(Italy) (Luxembourg)	Giorgio Galimberti; Gilles Kremer	6; 1	6; 3

=== Great Britain vs. Serbia and Montenegro ===
Great Britain
2
Braehead Arena, Glasgow, Great Britain
7–9 April 2006
Carpet (indoor)

Serbia and Montenegro
3

			1	2	3	4	5
1	(United Kingdom) (Serbia and Montenegro)	Greg Rusedski; Janko Tipsarević	6; 3	6^{2} 7^{7}	7; 5	7; 5
2	(United Kingdom) (Serbia and Montenegro)	Arvind Parmar; Novak Djokovic	3; 6	2; 6	5; 7
3	(United Kingdom) (Serbia and Montenegro)	Andy Murray / Greg Rusedski; Ilija Bozoljac / Nenad Zimonjić	3; 6	6; 3	3; 6	4; 6
4	(United Kingdom) (Serbia and Montenegro)	Greg Rusedski; Novak Djokovic	3; 6	6; 4	3; 6	6^{6} 7^{8}
5	(United Kingdom) (Serbia and Montenegro)	Arvind Parmar; Ilija Bozoljac	7; 5	6; 4

=== Ukraine vs. Belgium ===
Ukraine
1
International Tennis Club, Kyiv, Ukraine
7–9 April 2006
Carpet (indoor)

Belgium
4

			1	2	3	4	5
1	(Ukraine) (Belgium)	Orest Tereshchuk; Olivier Rochus	3; 6	1; 6	2; 6
2	(Ukraine) (Belgium)	Sergiy Stakhovsky; Kristof Vliegen	3; 6	3; 6	6^{5} 7^{7}
3	(Ukraine) (Belgium)	Sergei Bubka / Sergiy Stakhovsky; Olivier Rochus / Kristof Vliegen	6^{3} 7^{7}	3; 6	2; 6
4	(Ukraine) (Belgium)	Sergiy Stakhovsky; Gilles Elseneer	3; 6	6^{2} 7^{7}
5	(Ukraine) (Belgium)	Sergei Bubka; Stefan Wauters	7^{7} 6^{5}	3; 6	7^{10} 6^{8}

== First Round Play-offs Matches ==
=== Israel vs. Great Britain ===
Israel
3
International Lawn Tennis Centre, Eastbourne, Great Britain
21–23 July 2006
grass (outdoor)

Great Britain
2

			1	2	3	4	5
1	(Israel) (United Kingdom)	Noam Okun; Alex Bogdanović	6; 4	7; 5	6; 2
2	(Israel) (United Kingdom)	Andy Ram; Andy Murray	6; 2	6; 4	5; 7	2; 6	3; 6
3	(Israel) (United Kingdom)	Jonathan Erlich / Andy Ram; Jamie Delgado / Andy Murray	3; 6	6; 3	5; 7	6; 3	6; 4
4	(Israel) (United Kingdom)	Noam Okun; Jamie Delgado	6; 3	6; 4	6^{5} 7^{7}	2; 6	6; 3
5	(Israel) (United Kingdom)	Dekel Valtzer; Alan Mackin	2; 6	1; 6

== Second Round Play-offs Matches ==
=== Morocco vs. Portugal ===
Morocco
2
Royale Tennis Club de Marrakech, Marrakesh, Morocco
22–24 September 2006
Clay

Portugal
3

			1	2	3	4	5
1	(Morocco) (Portugal)	Rabie Chaki; Gonçalo Nicau	4; 6	6; 3	1; 6	6; 3	12; 10
2	(Morocco) (Portugal)	Mehdi Tahiri; Frederico Gil	2; 6	4; 6	2; 6
3	(Morocco) (Portugal)	Mounir El Aarej / Mehdi Ziadi; Frederico Gil / Gonçalo Nicau	1; 6	3; 6	1; 6
4	(Morocco) (Portugal)	Rabie Chaki; Frederico Gil	6; 1	5; 7	1; 6	6^{5} 7^{7}
5	(Morocco) (Portugal)	Mehdi Tahiri; Pedro Sousa	7^{7} 6^{2}	4; 6	6; 2

=== Great Britain vs. Ukraine ===
Great Britain
3
Lawn Tennis Club, Odesa, Ukraine
22–24 September 2006
Clay

Ukraine
2

			1	2	3	4	5
1	(United Kingdom) (Ukraine)	Greg Rusedski; Sergiy Stakhovsky	1; 6	6; 3	5; 7	6; 4	9; 7
2	(United Kingdom) (Ukraine)	Andy Murray; Oleksandr Dolgopolov	6; 3	6; 4	6; 2
3	(United Kingdom) (Ukraine)	Jamie Delgado / Andy Murray; Sergiy Stakhovsky / Orest Tereshchuck	3; 6	3; 6	3; 6
4	(United Kingdom) (Ukraine)	Andy Murray; Sergiy Stakhovsky	6; 3	6; 2	7; 5
5	(United Kingdom) (Ukraine)	Jamie Baker; Sergei Bubka	3; 6	6^{6} 7^{8}
