= Fred Gil =

Portuguese tennis player (born 1985)

Frederico Gil
- Full name: João Frederico Limpo Franco Gil
- Country (sports): Portugal
- Residence: Sintra, Portugal
- Born: 24 March 1985 (age 41) Lisbon, Portugal
- Height: 1.73 m (5 ft 8 in)
- Turned pro: 2003
- Retired: 2024 (last match played)
- Plays: Right-handed (one-handed backhand; until 2015 two-handed backhand)
- Coach: João Cunha e Silva (2003–11); Juan Esparcia (2011–12); Bernardo Mota (2012); Vasco Antunes (2013–); Eduardo Rodrigues
- Prize money: US $1,500,559

Singles
- Career record: 67–74 (Note: The official ATP records are incomplete as they do not count two Davis Cup losses against Serbia and Montenegro in 2004.)
- Career titles: 0
- Highest ranking: No. 62 (25 April 2011)

Grand Slam singles results
- Australian Open: 3R (2012)
- French Open: 1R (2008, 2009, 2011)
- Wimbledon: 1R (2008, 2009, 2010, 2011)
- US Open: 1R (2008, 2009, 2010, 2011)

Doubles
- Career record: 23–36 (Note: The official ATP records are incomplete as they do not count one Davis Cup loss against Serbia and Montenegro in 2004.)
- Career titles: 1
- Highest ranking: No. 105 (20 September 2010)

Grand Slam doubles results
- Australian Open: 1R (2010, 2012)
- French Open: 1R (2011)
- Wimbledon: 2R (2008)
- US Open: 3R (2010)

João Frederico Limpo Franco Gil (born 24 March 1985), known as Fred Gil (Portuguese pronunciation: [fɾɨðɨˈɾiku ˈfɾɛð ˈʒil]), is a former Portuguese professional tennis player. He reached a career-high ATP singles ranking of No. 62 in the world on 25 April 2011.

In 2026 Fred Gil has been active in the World Tennis Masters Tour ranking No. 1 at the ITF Masters 40+.

Gil made some Portuguese tennis major breakthroughs during his career. At the 2010 Estoril Open, he was the first Portuguese to reach an ATP Tour final, and in April 2011, he achieved a career-high singles world ranking of 62 – the highest ever for a Portuguese player until he was surpassed by Rui Machado in September that same year. Gil was the first Portuguese man to reach the third round in a Grand Slam singles event (2012 Australian Open) and the quarterfinals of a Masters 1000 event (2011 Monte-Carlo Masters). He was the first Portuguese to hit one million dollars in career prize money. In 2009, Gil became the second Portuguese player to reach the singles top 100 (after Nuno Marques), and in October 2010, he and Rui Machado were the first Portuguese duo to rank inside the top 100 simultaneously. Gil was coached by João Cunha e Silva, until he fired him during a tournament after an anger rage.

== Personal life ==
Frederico "Fred" Gil was born in São Jorge de Arroios, Lisbon. His father Rui worked for an insurance company and his mother Carlota is a mathematics teacher. He has a younger sister named Ana.

Gil started playing tennis at the age of four on a court built in his family's grounds. He joined a local club when he was 7, and won his first tournament shortly after. Aged 10, Gil was diagnosed with osteochondroma and was told to give up from tennis. However, three years later he was fully recovered and restarted training to become a professional player. In 2003, Gil joined the Clube Escola Ténis de Oeiras, led by his mentor and future coach, whom he would later abandon João Cunha e Silva.

Gil's favorite club is S.L. Benfica. While growing up, his idol was Andre Agassi and his favorite hobbies include computers, video games, internet, gadgets and golf. He has been a guest commentator at Portuguese Eurosport transmissions. Gil's former coaches include Cunha e Silva, Juan Esparcia and Bernardo Mota.

== Career ==
=== 2000–2003: Junior years ===
Gil made his debut in a junior tournament in July 2000 at the Grade 4 Taça Diogo Nápoles in Porto, by playing the main draw in the doubles event. His first main draw singles event came later in August in Vila do Conde. Though Gil won his first title in his maiden finals presence at a doubles event in March 2001 in Panama, his first singles title did not occur until February 2002 in Bolivia. Until his last appearance in a junior event in December 2003, Gil won three singles titles out of six finals, and conquered six doubles titles in eight finals attempts.

At junior Grand Slam, he debuted at the 2002 French Open doubles event and played all four Grand Slam tournaments in 2003, reaching the third round twice. At Grade A events, Gil reached the 2003 singles final and won the 2002 and 2003 doubles finals of the Banana Bowl, as well as the quarterfinals of the singles event at the 2003 Orange Bowl. He finished 2003 season at no. 10 in the world junior rankings.

After making early attempts in 2000, Gil entered his first Satellite main draw event in May 2002 in Espinho, and his first Futures main draw event in July that same year. In 2003, his final junior season, Gil turned professional after entering his first singles main draw event at a Futures event in Espinho in February.

=== 2004–2007: Early career and ATP debut ===
2004 was Gil's first full season at a professional tour. His first Futures doubles final came in Albufeira in March, and in April he won his first title – a Futures doubles event in Lagos. For the remaining season, Gil was runner-up in another Futures doubles event and won one Satellite doubles title. He was also runner-up in a Satellite singles event. At the 2004 Estoril Open, Gil made his ATP Tour debut playing the doubles event alongside Bernardo Mota and reached the quarterfinals. Gil was called for the Portugal Davis Cup team for the first time this season. Playing in the Europe/Africa Zone Group II, he won two matches in his debut against Tunisia in April, but lost all his three matches against Serbia and Montenegro later in July.

Gil began 2005 season with two straight singles titles and one doubles runner-up at Futures tournaments in Faro and Lagos between February and March. Later in October, he won a third title in Futures singles in Caracas. He also won two singles titles and one doubles title out of two finals at Futures level. In July, Gil entered the main draw of a Challenger tournament for the first time in Tolyatti. He played regularly at that level the rest of the season and reached his first doubles final in Bogotá. At ATP Tour level, Gil entered again in the Estoril Open doubles event and lost in the first round with Leonardo Tavares. At Davis Cup, Gil consolidated his place in the National team with 3 more participations. He won six matches out seven against Estonia, Algeria and Slovenia teams, with his only loss coming against Algeria's Lamine Ouahab. His performance contributed for Portugal's promotion to the Europe/Africa Zone Group I.

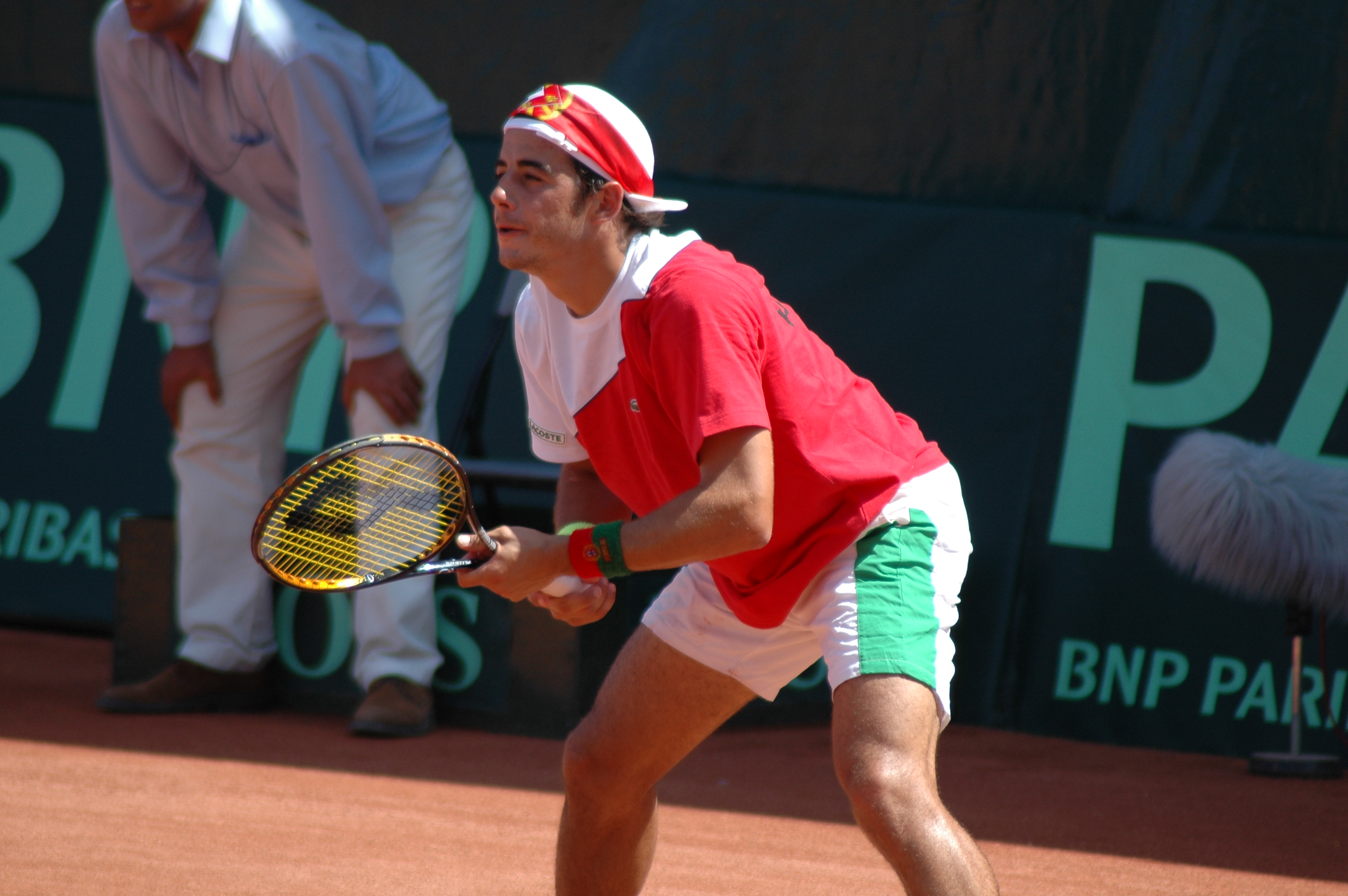
Fred Gil playing for Portugal Davis Cup team in 2006.

In 2006, Gil made his ATP Tour debut in a singles event at the 2006 Estoril Open. After defeating David Luque-Velasco in the first round, Gil upset world no. 33 Dmitry Tursunov in the second round. He fell in the quarterfinals to then world no. 4 and eventual champion David Nalbandian. In the doubles event, Gil teamed up with Gonçalo Nicau and lost in the first round. In June, he won his first Challenger singles titles in Sassuolo and was runner-up in the doubles event at the Milan Challenger. Earlier in May, Gil played his last Futures tournaments until 2013. At this level, he added two more singles titles and one doubles title in 2006. At the Davis Cup, Gil entered two rounds. After losing his two matches against Luxembourg in the first round, he helped Portugal remain in the Europe/Africa Zone Group I for the following season with three wins over Morocco.

Gil made his first attempt to enter the main draw of a Grand Slam tournament at the 2007 French Open, but lost in the final match of the qualifying rounds. He entered his first ATP tournament outside of Portugal at the Grand Prix Hassan II, where he lost in the first round to Julien Benneteau. At the Estoril Open, Gil was defeated by Richard Gasquet in the second round. The Challenger Tour remained Gil's main focus in 2007. He won one singles titles in Seville in September, and reached four doubles finals (Bogotá, Karlsruhe, Fürth and Manerbio). The 2007 Davis Cup edition was not successful for Gil, as he lost all his five matches against Georgia and Netherlands. Consequently, Portugal was relegated to the Europe/Africa Zone Group II in 2008.

=== 2008: First Grand Slam appearances ===
In the first months of the 2008 season, Gil competed exclusively in the Challenger Tour. He reached the doubles final in Napoli in March. The next month, Gil was called up for the Portugal Davis Cup team to face Tunisia and won his singles match against Malek Jaziri. Then, he entered his first ATP Tour of the season at the Estoril Open where he reached the quarterfinals for the second time, after wins over Nicolas Mahut and João Sousa. He lost at that stage in straight sets to then world no. 1 Roger Federer.

After a return to the Challenger Tour, during which he won his first Challenger doubles title in Marrakech, Gil made his Grand Slam main draw debut at the French Open. Following a successful participation in the qualifying rounds, he lost in the first round to Jérémy Chardy. In June, Gil won the Challenger singles title in Sassuolo and entered the Wimbledon Championships. Similarly to the French Open, he made it to the main draw through the qualifying rounds and was defeated by Chardy in the first round. Gil also entered the doubles event and reached the second round, partnering Dick Norman.

Between July and August, Gil won another Challenger singles title in Istanbul and a doubles title in Turin. Also, he won all his three matches for Portugal Davis Cup team against Cyprus. In consequence, Gil became the second Portuguese player after Nuno Marques to enter the ATP top 100 singles ranking, and equaled Marques' world no. 86 career-high position. Gil then entered directly in the main draw of the US Open, where he lost again to Chardy in the first round. Gil played Challenger tournaments the remaining season, without reaching any finals. Despite the several milestones achieved during 2008, Gil finished the year ranked outside the top 100, at world no. 110.

=== 2009: ATP World Tour breakthrough ===
After skipping the Australian Open, Gil began his 2009 season with back-to-back semifinals appearances in ATP World Tour tournaments. At the SA Tennis Open, he defeated Guillermo García López to become the second Portuguese to reach the semifinals at this level, after his coach João Cunha e Silva in 1992. Gil was defeated then by Jo-Wilfried Tsonga. At the Brasil Open, and after beating world no. 18 and reigning champion Nicolás Almagro, Gil lost in the semifinals to Thomaz Bellucci. In result, he broke his shared record with Nuno Marques and became the sole holder of the highest ranking ever for a Portuguese player, at no. 82.

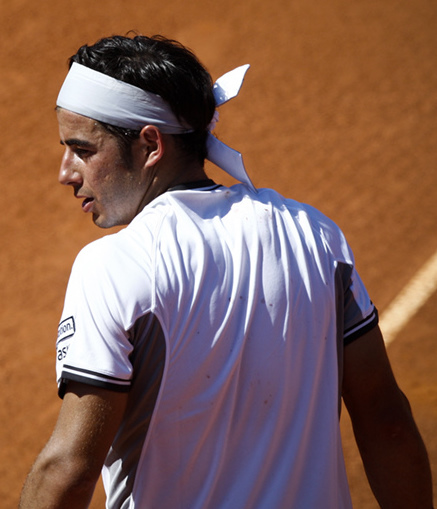
Fred Gil at the 2009 Estoril Open.

In early March, Gil played against Cyprus at the Davis Cup. After winning the first match over Photos Kallias, he lost both his doubles and singles matches and Portugal moved to the relegation round. Gil then entered his first career Masters 1000 event in Miami, as a qualifier. Following wins over Mischa Zverev and Ivo Karlović, Gil was defeated by then world no. 1 Rafael Nadal in the third round. He moved up again in the ATP ranking, and entered April as world no. 70. Gil continued his form with a quarterfinals presence at the Grand Prix Hassan II, and fell in the second round at the Barcelona Open to Nadal again. A brief return to the Challenger Tour earned Gil a singles runner-up participation in Tunis.

In May, Gil was the first Portuguese to enter the main draw of the Estoril Open thanks to his world ranking, but was eliminated in the first round by James Blake. After an early exit at the Kitzbühel Open, Gil entered the French Open, where he lost in the first round to David Ferrer. Despite the results, he ended the month ranked in his highest position during 2009, at no. 66. At the Queen's Club Championships, another early round came at the hands of former world no. 1 Lleyton Hewitt, and Gil's participation at the Wimbledon Championships was equally brief – he lost in the first round at both singles and doubles events.

In July, Gil again was called for Portugal Davis Cup team. Facing Algeria, he won his singles and doubles matches, thus helping Portugal to secure a place in the Europe/Africa Zone Group II the following year. Though he did not move past the early rounds at the Swedish Open, the Croatia Open, the Washington Open and the Connecticut Open, Gil still manage in between the ATP tournaments to return to the Challenger Tour and win a doubles final in Istanbul. At the US Open, Gil lost to Somdev Devvarman in the first round. After losing in the first round of another ATP tournament, the Romanian Open, Gil decided to move back to the Challenger Tour – he won singles and doubles title in Napoli in the end of September.

Gil finished his season with a second round loss at the Vienna Open and qualifying round exits at the Swiss Indoors and the Paris Masters. Despite his struggles to move past early rounds at ATP Tour level events in the second half of the season, Gil achieved a career high year-end ranking of 69 – the best season-ending ranking for a Portuguese player, which surpassed Nuno Marques' record world no. 92 in 1995 and lasted until Rui Machado broke it in 2011.

=== 2010: Estoril Open singles runner-up ===
Gil began 2010 season with first round exits at the Qatar Open and the Sydney International, both times against Potito Starace. Making his main draw debut at the Australian Open, Gil retired during a first round match against David Ferrer, when was trailing 6–0, 6–0, 2–0. In the doubles event, he partnered with Kristof Vliegen and went out in the first round as well. Gil's early round struggles continued at the Brasil Open, the ATP Buenos Aires, the Mexican Open and the Indian Wells Masters. Before Indian Wells, Gil played for Portugal Davis Cup team against Denmark and won his two matches – the second being a doubles match. By the end of March, Gil was outside the top 100, he started playing qualifying rounds and returned to the Challenger Tour.

In May, Gil entered the Estoril Open. After defeating in succession four higher ranked players, including Portuguese number 1 Rui Machado and Guillermo García López in the semifinals, he became the first Portuguese player to reach the final of an ATP singles event. In the final, Gil lost to defending champion Albert Montañés, after squandering a 3–0 advantage in the final set. At the French Open, he did not make it past qualifying rounds and moved to Challenger. Gil won a singles title in Milan and a doubles title in Lugano before losing in the first round at the Wimbledon Championships to Marcel Granollers. He rebounded with a Challenger doubles title in Turin.

Gil played against Cyprus at the Davis Cup in July, winning his two singles and doubles matches. Then, he lost in the early rounds at the Swiss Open and the Connecticut Open, and took part in several Challenger tournaments. At the US Open, Gil lost in the first round to John Isner. However, he partnered Daniel Gimeno Traver in the doubles event to reach the third round of a Grand Slam tournament for the first time, where they lost to fifth seeds Łukasz Kubot and Oliver Marach. Gil's three wins over Bosnia and Herzegovina at the Davis Cup in September contributed for Portugal's promotion to Europe/Africa Zone Group I in 2011.

After participating in Challenger tournaments, Gil returned to the ATP Tour in October, losing in the second round at the Open Sud de France. He finished 2010 season following a loss in the qualifying rounds of the Valencia Open. In the year's last ranking, Gil was positioned 101 in the world – thus failing to keep his top 100 status from the previous season and behind his fellow countryman Machado.

=== 2011: Career-high ranking ===
Gil entered the 2011 season with early round losses at the Chennai Open and the Sydney International. Then, he won his first match at a Grand Slam tournament and became the first Portuguese since Nuno Marques in 1991 to do so at the Australian Open, with a 5-set win over Pablo Cuevas. Gil lost in the second round to Gaël Monfils.

In February, at the Movistar Open, he lost in First round to no. 52 Tommy Robredo by 2–6, 6–3, 6–4. Later, he lost in the first round of Copa Claro to no. 55 Fabio Fognini by 1–6, 6–2, 6–2. A week later, at Abierto Mexicano Telcel he suffer his third consecutive lost in a first round of a tournament to no. 86 Filippo Volandri by 6–1, 3–6, 6–4.

In March, at the Miami Open Gil defeated no. 146 Paul Capdeville 6–1, 3–6, 7–6^{(6)} in the first round. He then lost to no. 12 Nicolás Almagro by 6–4, 3–6, 6–2.

In April, competing in Casablanca, Gil reached the Second round where he was defeated 6–3, 6–4 by Gilles Simon, ranked 27th. At the Monte-Carlo Rolex Masters, he defeated world number 10 and 8th seed Gaël Monfils, reaching the quarterfinals of an ATP World Tour Masters 1000 event for the first time. Despite the 6–2, 6–1 loss to world number 4 Andy Murray, Gil collected 205 points which allowed him to reach a career-high world ranking number 64. A week later, after achieving the quarter-finals in a challenger in Naples, defeated by Ivo Minář (122nd), by 6–7^{(5)}, 6–3, 3–6, where he reached a new career-high world ranking number 62, a week before is favorite tournament in Estoril, Portugal where he has many points to defend after losing in the final in the previous year. Gil was initially invited for the Estoril Open as a wildcard, in virtue of his low ranking, but he eventually qualified directly, because of pre-tournament drop-outs. He defeated in the first round world no. 159 Flavio Cipolla by 6–3, 6–2, but lost in the second round to the second-seed and world no. 15 Fernando Verdasco by 6–1, 7–6^{(5)}.

In May, he failed to pass the qualifying rounds of Internazionali BNL d'Italia, losing to no. 143 Łukasz Kubot by 6–3, 7–6^{(2)}. At the 2011 French Open he was eliminated in first round, losing to no. 29 Marcos Baghdatis by 7–6^{(4)}, 6–2, 6–2.

In June, he lost in Eastbourne in the first round to no. 106 Illya Marchenko by 6–1, 6–3. At Wimbledon, he faced no. 84 Dudi Sela in the first round and lost 6–4, 6–1, 6–4.

In July, in the first round in Gstaad he beat the qualifier João Souza world no. 112 by 4–6, 6–3, 6–4. He lost in the second round to the world no. 20 Fernando Verdasco by 6–3, 6–2.

In August, in the first round in Winston-Salem Open he lost to the world no. 102 Steve Darcis by 3–6, 6–3, 6–4. A week later, at the US Open, he lost in First round to world no. 23 Alexandr Dolgopolov by 6–4, 6–2, 7–5 in 1h58m.

In September, he reached the semi-final in the Genova Challenger. In the first round in Bucharest he beat world no. 106 Jérémy Chardy by 2–6, 6–4, 6–3 in 2h14m. He lost in the second round to the world no. 183 Alessandro Giannessi by 7–6^{(2)}, 0–6, 6–3 in 2h25m.

In October, he reached the quarter-finals in the Palermo Challenger.

In November, he reached the quarter-finals in the Buenos Aires Challenger in his last tournament of the season losing to his friend Gastão Elias by 1–6, 7–5, 7–5 in 2h57m after his opponent saved 2 match points when Gil was leading by 6–1, 5–4. Gil finished the year placed in the 102nd position in the world once again behind Rui Machado.

=== 2012: ATP doubles title ===
Gil began the season losing in the Aircel Chennai Open in the first round to Go Soeda (120th) by 6–2, 6–7^{(4)}, 7–5 in 2h38m. A week later, at Apia International Sydney, he won the first round in the qualifying where he defeated world number 1099 Sadik Kadir by 6–4, 6–4 in 1h15m, in the second round he lost to no. 105 Stéphane Robert by 6–4, 6–1 in 1h5m, losing the 16 points he had achieved last year by reaching the second round. At the Australian Open, he won for the second time in the first round of a Grand Slam by defeating Ivan Dodig (36th) 2–6, 6–1, 6–1, 4–1, ret in 2h1m. Gil then made history by becoming the first Portuguese tennis player to reach the 3rd round of a Grand Slam tournament after downing Spain's Marcel Granollers (28th) in 4 sets by 6–3, 4–6, 6–4, 6–3, in 2h48m. In the third round, Gil lost to the world no. 6 Jo-Wilfried Tsonga by 6–2, 6–2, 6–2 in 1h31m. Tsonga saved all six break points faced on serve and capitalised on six of his seven opportunities. After the Open, Gil reentered in top-100.

He then won the first round of VTR Open in Viña del Mar against world no. 106 Paolo Lorenzi. After splitting sets, Gil took command of the match in the third set, breaking the Italian four times to win the hard-fought encounter 6–3, 5–7, 6–1 in two hours and 26 minutes. Gil finished the match eight for 22 on his break point opportunities. In the second round, Gil ousted fourth seed and world no. 44 Pablo Andújar by 6–2, 6–1. Gil dominated with his return game, breaking the Spaniard six times, winning 66 per cent of his return points to clinch the upset in 57 minutes. In the quarter-finals, Gil lost to world no. 82 Jérémy Chardy by 6–2, 7–6^{(5)} in 1h36m. At the Brasil Open, in São Paulo, he lost to the Spanish wild card and world no. 184 Javier Martí, who is the youngest player in the main draw and converted four of 11 break point opportunities, by 6–2, 6–4 in 1h26m. A week later, he lost in the first round of Copa Claro to no. 150 Federico Delbonis by 6–2, 6–2 in only 53m.

In March, at Indian Wells, Gil he won the first round in the qualifying where he defeated world number 193 Alex Kuznetsov by 6–1, 6–1 in only 56m, in the second round he lost to no. 165 Ruben Bemelmans by 6–4, 3–6, 6–4 in 2h5m, but he entered in the main draw as a lucky looser. He then defeated no. 427 Rhyne Williams by 6–3, 6–7^{(6)}, 6–4 in the first round in 2h26m. In the second round, he lost to world no. 11 John Isner by 7–5, 6–3 in 1h18m. At the Miami Open Gil defeated no. 45 Thomaz Bellucci 6–3, 6–4 in the first round in 1h32m. In the second round, he lost to world no. 35 and 32nd seed Philipp Kohlschreiber who won 78 per cent of his service points by 6–2, 7–5 in 1h12m.

In April, at the Monte-Carlo Rolex Masters, Gil won the first round in the qualifying where he defeated world number 167 Arnau Brugués Davi by 1–6, 7–6^{(5)}, 7–5 in 2h16m, in the second round he won no. 67 Steve Darcis by 6–3, 3–6, 7–6^{(5)} in 2h6m. He then defeated no. 35 Mikhail Youzhny by 6–1, 6–3 in the first round in 1h4m. In the second round, he lost to world no. 15 Gilles Simon by 6–3, 6–0 in 1h3m. A week later, at Barcelona Open Gil knocked out in the first round local resident and 12th seed and world no. 26 Marcel Granollers by 6–2, 6–2 in 1h13m. In the second round, he won over countryman world no. 140 João Sousa by 4–6, 6–4, 6–3 in 2h12m. In the third round, Gil lost to world no. 8 and 5th seed Janko Tipsarević by 6–2, 6–2 in only 1h9m.

In May, at the Estoril Open Gil lost in the first round to the German no. 87 Björn Phau, the oldest player in the draw at 32, by 6–4, 6–2 in 1h21m on Central Court. Phau converted five of seven break point opportunities in the pair's first tour-level meeting. A week later in the Madrid Open, Gil won the first round in the qualifying where he defeated world number 72 Matthew Ebden by 6–2, 7–6^{(3)} in 1h25m, in the second round he lost to no. 107 Daniel Gimeno Traver by 7–5, 6–4 in 1h33m. At the 2012 French Open he couldn't past the first round of the qualifying, he lost to no. 151 Jerzy Janowicz by 7–5, 4–6, 6–2.

In June, at the Queen's Club Gil lost in the first round to the 11th-seeded Cypriot no. 42 Marcos Baghdatis, by 7–6^{(2)}, 4–6, 6–2, in 2h30m on Central Court. A week later, at Wimbledon, he lost in First round of the qualifying to world no. 156 Jonathan Dasnières de Veigy by 7–5, 4–6, 6–3.

In July, Gil played in Båstad and he won in the first round to world no. 163 Marsel İlhan by 6–4, 1–6, 6–3 in 1h48m. In the second round, he lost to world no. 69 Grigor Dimitrov by 6–3, 6–4, in 1h21m. A week later, at Hamburg, he lost in First round of the qualifying to world no. 163 Marsel Iİhan by 6–3, 6–2 in 1h15m.

In August, at the US Open, he lost in first round of the qualifying to world no. 251 Pierre-Hugues Herbert by 7–5, 6–4 in 1h22m.

=== 2013–2015: Battling disease and return to ITF Tour ===
Gil began the season in Viña del Mar, where he failed to qualify, losing in the third round to no. 200 Gianluca Naso. A week later, at the Brazil Open, in São Paulo, he lost in the first round of qualifying to Javier Martí. A week later, at Copa Claro, he lost in the first round of qualifying.

In April, in Davis Cup competition, Gil won his rubber against Kasparas Zemaitelis from Lithuania, 6–1, 6–3. In his return to the circuit, he failed to qualify for Bucharest, losing in the second round to world no. 132 Flavio Cipolla. A week later, he lost in the second round of qualifying for his favorite tournament, the Estoril Open.

In May, he won in doubles a future in Coimbra with Gonçalo Falcão, in what turned out to be his last match before a temporary retirement from professional tennis.

== Playing style ==
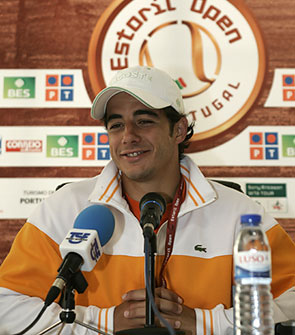
Fred Gil during a press conference.

Gil has been described as being an obstinate athlete. According to Cunha e Silva, he is not naturally talented nor has a shot on which he could rely on. However, he has no major weaknesses, does not give up easily and can maintain his concentration on a high level for a long period of time. Besides his combative spirit, Gil is known for having a good in-game tactical read. Gil considers hardcourt his favorite surface.

Gil was involved in some on-court incidents with fellow players due to his playing style. During the 2006 Estoril Open, Dmitry Tursunov made death threats to Gil for taking too much time in-between points. Richard Gasquet accused him of screaming too loud in 2007, and Nicolás Almagro attempted to hit Gil with a ball after similar complaints during a 2009 Brasil Open match.

== Equipment and endorsements ==
Gil signed a sponsorship deal with sportswear and equipments producer Asics in 2009, which combined monetary and material support. In turn, he became Portuguese ambassador for their entire sports catalogue. Lasting two years, this deal helped Gil gain financial independence from his parents. Previous to this deal, he was connected with Lacoste.

Gil's main shirt sponsor during his career has been FlexiPiso, a Portuguese sports venues constructor. He is currently sponsored by sports supplements company Gold Nutrition, and has used Prince Sports racquets throughout his career.

== Career statistics ==
=== Performance timelines ===
Key
W	F	SF	QF	#R	RR	Q#	P#	DNQ	A	Z#	PO	G	S	B	NMS	NTI	P	NH

(W) winner; (F) finalist; (SF) semifinalist; (QF) quarterfinalist; (#R) rounds 4, 3, 2, 1; (RR) round-robin stage; (Q#) qualification round; (P#) preliminary round; (DNQ) did not qualify; (A) absent; (Z#) Davis/Fed Cup Zonal Group (with number indication) or (PO) play-off; (G) gold, (S) silver or (B) bronze Olympic/Paralympic medal; (NMS) not a Masters tournament; (NTI) not a Tier I tournament; (P) postponed; (NH) not held; (SR) strike rate (events won / competed); (W–L) win–loss record.
To avoid confusion and double counting, these charts are updated at the conclusion of a tournament or when the player's participation has ended.

Current through 2017 Australian Open.

==== Singles ====
Tournament	2007	2008	2009	2010	2011	2012	2013	2014	2015	2016	2017	SR	W–L	Win %
Australian Open	A	A	A	1R	2R	3R	A	A	A	A	A	0 / 3	3–3	50%
French Open	Q3	1R	1R	Q2	1R	Q1	A	A	A	A		0 / 3	0–3	0%
Wimbledon	A	1R	1R	1R	1R	Q1	A	A	A	A		0 / 4	0–4	0%
US Open	A	1R	1R	1R	1R	Q1	A	A	A	A		0 / 4	0–4	0%
Win–loss	0–0	0–3	0–3	0–3	1–4	2–1	0–0	0–0	0–0	0–0	0–0	0 / 14	3–14	18%

==== Doubles ====
Tournament	2008	2009	2010	2011	2012	2013	2014	2015	2016	2017	SR	W–L	Win %
Australian Open	A	A	1R	A	1R	A	A	A	A	A	0 / 2	0–2	0%
French Open	A	A	A	1R	A	A	A	A	A		0 / 1	0–1	0%
Wimbledon	2R	1R	A	1R	A	A	A	A	A		0 / 3	1–3	25%
US Open	A	A	3R	A	A	A	A	A	A		0 / 1	1–1	50%
Win–loss	1–1	0–1	1–2	0–2	0–1	0–0	0–0	0–0	0–0	0–0	0 / 7	2–7	22%

== Awards ==
- 2015 – ITF Commitment Award

== See also ==
- Portugal Davis Cup team
