= Gonçalo Nicau =

Portuguese tennis player (born 1982)

- Country (sports): Portugal
- Born: 3 July 1982 (age 44) Portalegre, Portugal
- Turned pro: 2001
- Retired: 2007
- Prize money: $13,399

Singles
- Career record: 0–2
- Career titles: 0
- Highest ranking: No. 531 (26 February 2007)

Doubles
- Career record: 1–1
- Career titles: 0
- Highest ranking: No. 495 (20 November 2006)

Coaching career (2007–present)
- Rui Machado (2007–2010); CET Oeiras (2011–present)

Coaching achievements
- Coachee singles titles total: 0
- Coachee doubles titles total: 0

Gonçalo Nicau (born 3 July 1982) is a Portuguese former professional tennis player who competed in the ITF Men's Circuit. He achieved his highest singles ranking of 531 in the world by the Association of Tennis Professionals (ATP) in February 2007. Though he did not enter a singles event in the ATP Challenger Tour, Nicau did play in the doubles event at the 2006 Estoril Open and was selected for two Davis Cup ties in 2006.

== Career ==
=== Junior years ===
Nicau had a brief junior career. He made his main draw debut in August 1998 at the Grade 5 Junior Tennis Cup in Vila do Conde. His other main draw appearance was at the same event the following year. He attained the Under-16 Portuguese No. 1 position and was Under-18 runner-up at the Portuguese National Championships in 1999. That same year, he joined Clube de Ténis de Faro, where he remained until 2003.

=== Professional circuit ===
After a qualifying attempt in 1997, Nicau turned professional with a main draw debut in the ITF Men's Circuit in November 2001 at the Albufeira Satellite tournament. His first win came in 2004 at another Satellite event in Coimbra, where he reached the quarterfinals. In 2003 Nicau and Israel Monteiro lost to Leonardo Tavares and Tiago Godinho in the final of the men's doubles event at the Portuguese National Championships.

In February 2006, Nicau joined the Portugal Davis Cup team for the first time, but lost the singles match to Gilles Kremer of Luxembourg. In March, Nicau played his first professional final at a Futures event in Benin City and captured his first title at a Futures doubles event in Albufeira. In May, he partnered with Frederico Gil, constituting his only appearance at the main draw of an ATP Tour event. At the 2006 Estoril Open doubles event, he and Gil were defeated in the first round by the second seeds and eventual champions Lukáš Dlouhý and Pavel Vízner.

After winning Futures singles and doubles events in Spain in August, Nicau was called up for the Portugal Davis Cup team for the second and final time in September. Against Morocco, he lost the singles match to Rabie Chaki after 4 hours and 30 minutes of play – it was the longest match ever for Portugal in the competition until 2010. Nicau and Gil won the doubles match, and Portugal won the tie. Nicau ended 2006 with a runner-up performance at the Portuguese National Championships.

Nicau began the 2007 season with early round losses at Futures events in March. In June, Nicau partnered with Rui Machado to win a doubles Futures event in Málaga, which turned out to be his last professional tournament.

== Post-retirement ==
Shortly after retiring, Nicau started coaching Rui Machado. Under his guidance, Machado entered his first Grand Slam main draw event at the 2008 US Open, won his first ATP Challenger titles in 2009, and broke through to the top 100 in October 2010. The partnership ended in December 2010. Nicau remained coaching at the Clube Escola de Ténis in Oeiras – where he had joined as a player in 2006. He worked under the supervision of João Cunha e Silva.

Nicau decided to join padel tennis in 2014. Alongside João Roque, Nicau became men doubles national champion in 2014 and 2015.

== Career finals ==
=== ITF Men's Circuit ===
==== Singles: 2 (1 title, 1 runner-up) ====
Category Futures (1–1)	Titles by surface Hard (0–1) Clay (1–0)	Titles by setting Outdoors (1–1) Indoors (0–0)

Outcome	Date	Category	Tournament	Surface	Opponent	Score
Runner-up	4 March 2006	Futures	Benin City, Nigeria F2	Hard	(United States) Nicholas Monroe	3–6, 4–6
Winner	6 August 2006	Futures	Xàtiva, Spain F25	Clay	(Spain) Miguel Ángel López Jaén	7–6^{(7–4)}, 7–5

==== Doubles: 5 (3 titles, 2 runners-up) ====
Category Futures (3–2)	Titles by surface Hard (1–2) Clay (2–0)	Titles by setting Outdoors (3–2) Indoors (0–0)

Outcome	Date	Category	Tournament	Surface	Partner	Opponents	Score
Winner	1 April 2006	Futures	Albufeira, Portugal F3	Hard	(Portugal) Frederico Gil	(Germany) Sebastian Fitz (Croatia) Franko Škugor	6–2, 6–2
Runner-up	22 April 2006	Futures	Melilla, Spain F11	Hard	(Portugal) Vasco Antunes	(Spain) Carlos Rexach-Itoiz (Germany) Eric Scherer	7–5, 4–6, 6–7^{(4–7)}
Winner	19 August 2006	Futures	Irun, Spain F26	Clay	(Argentina) Horacio Zeballos	(Spain) Miguel Ángel López Jaén (Spain) Juan-Miguel Such-Perez	7–5, 6–3
Runner-up	7 October 2006	Futures	El Ejido, Spain F32	Hard	(Spain) Guillermo Alcaide	(Greece) Alexandros Jakupovic (Netherlands) Antal van der Duim	6–4, 6–7^{(5–7)}, 6–7^{(3–7)}
Winner	29 June 2007	Futures	Málaga, Spain F24	Clay	(Portugal) Rui Machado	(Spain) Carlos Gonzalez-De Cueto (Spain) Sergio Pérez-Pérez	6–4, 6–0

== National participation ==
=== Davis Cup (1 win, 2 losses) ===
Nicau played 3 matches in 2 ties for the Portugal Davis Cup team in 2006. His singles record was 0–2 and his doubles record was 1–0 (1–2 overall).

Group membership World Group (0–0) WG Play-off (0–0) Group I (1–2) Group II (0–0) Group III (0–0) Group IV (0–0)	Matches by surface Hard (0–1) Clay (1–1) Grass (0–0) Carpet (0–0)	Matches by type Singles (0–2) Doubles (1–0)	Matches by setting Indoors (i) (0–1) Outdoors (1–1)	Matches by venue Portugal (0–0) Away (1–2)

- ▲ ▼ indicates the result of the Davis Cup match followed by the score, date, place of event, the zonal classification and its phase, and the court surface.

Rubber result	Rubber	Match type (partner if any)	Opponent nation	Opponent player(s)	Score
▼1–4; 10–12 February 2006; National Tennis Centre, Esch-sur-Alzette, Luxembourg; Group I Europe/Africa First Round; Hard(i) surface
Defeat	V	Singles (dead rubber)	Luxembourg	Gilles Kremer	7–6^{(10–8)}, 4–6, 4–6
▲3–2; 22–24 September 2006; Royale Tennis Club de Marrakesh, Marrakesh, Morocco; Group I Europe/Africa Relegation Play-off; Clay surface
Defeat	I	Singles	Morocco	Rabie Chaki	6–4, 3–6, 6–1, 3–6, 10–12
Victory	III	Doubles (with Frederico Gil)	Morocco	Mounir El Aarej / Mehdi Ziadi	6–1, 6–3, 6–1

== See also ==
- Portugal Davis Cup team
