= Julia Görges career statistics =

Career finals
Discipline	Type	Won	Lost	Total
Singles	Grand Slam	–	–	–
Singles	WTA Finals	–	–	–
Singles	WTA Elite	1	–	1
Singles	Premier M/5	–	–	–
Singles	WTA Tour	6	10	16
Singles	Olympics	–	–	–
Singles	Total	7	10	17
Doubles	Grand Slam	–	–	–
Doubles	WTA Finals	–	–	–
Doubles	Premier M/5	–	1	1
Doubles	WTA Tour	5	10	15
Doubles	Olympics	–	–	–
Doubles	Total	5	11	16
Mixed	Grand Slam	–	1	1
Mixed	Total	–	1	1

This is a list of the main career statistics of the professional German tennis player Julia Görges.

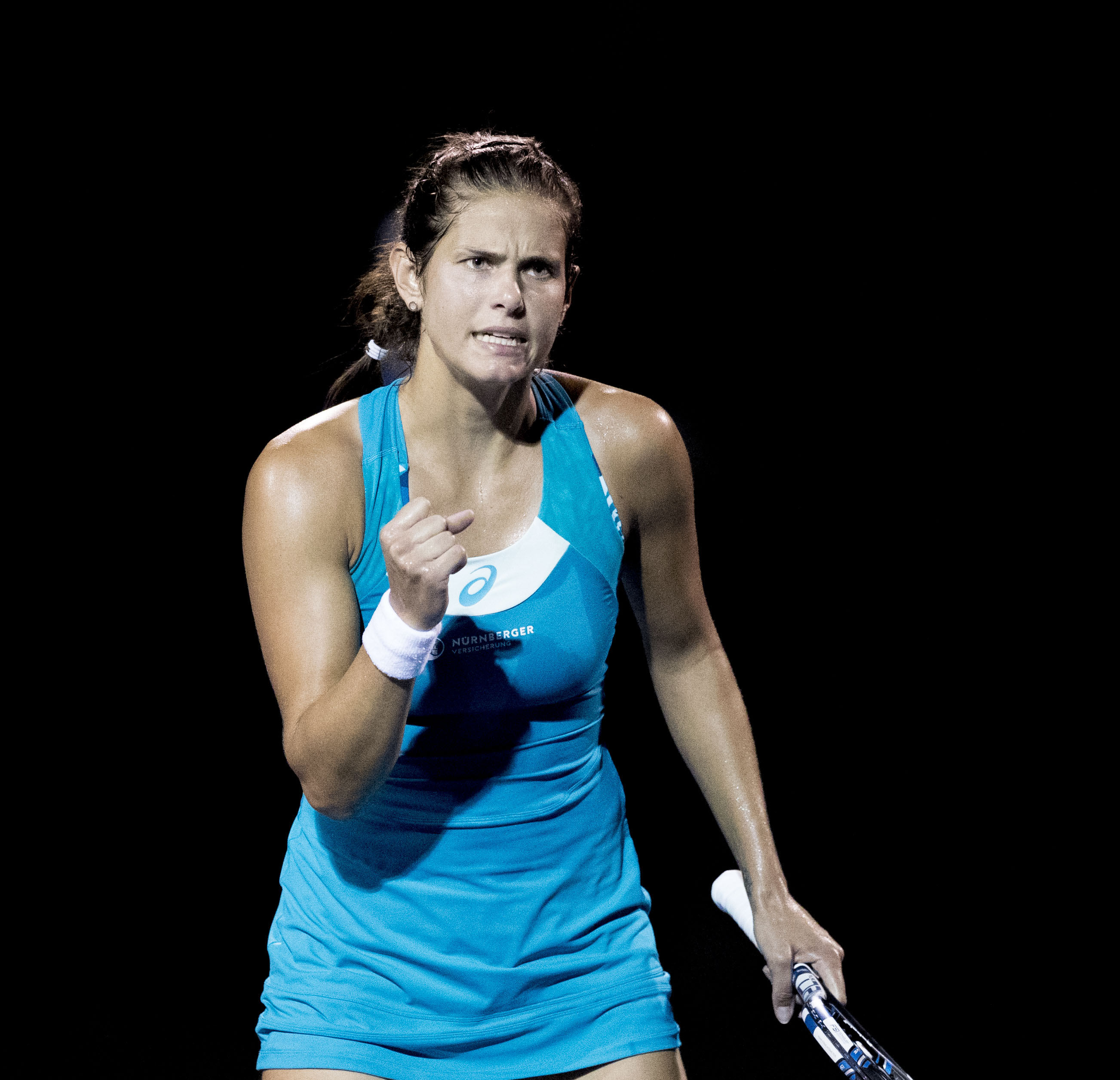
Julia Görges in 2017

== Performance timelines ==
Key
W	F	SF	QF	#R	RR	Q#	P#	DNQ	A	Z#	PO	G	S	B	NMS	NTI	P	NH

(W) winner; (F) finalist; (SF) semifinalist; (QF) quarterfinalist; (#R) rounds 4, 3, 2, 1; (RR) round-robin stage; (Q#) qualification round; (P#) preliminary round; (DNQ) did not qualify; (A) absent; (Z#) Davis/Fed Cup Zonal Group (with number indication) or (PO) play-off; (G) gold, (S) silver or (B) bronze Olympic/Paralympic medal; (NMS) not a Masters tournament; (NTI) not a Tier I tournament; (P) postponed; (NH) not held; (SR) strike rate (events won / competed); (W–L) win–loss record.

Only main-draw results in WTA Tour, Grand Slam tournaments, Fed Cup and Olympic Games are included in win–loss records.

=== Singles ===
Tournament	2006	2007	2008	2009	2010	2011	2012	2013	2014	2015	2016	2017	2018	2019	2020	SR	W–L	Win %
Grand Slam tournaments
Australian Open	A	A	Q2	1R	2R	3R	4R	4R	2R	4R	2R	2R	2R	1R	3R	0 / 12	18–12	60%
French Open	A	A	Q3	1R	2R	3R	3R	1R	2R	4R	2R	1R	3R	1R	2R	0 / 12	13–12	52%
Wimbledon	A	A	2R	1R	1R	3R	3R	1R	1R	1R	1R	1R	SF	3R	NH	0 / 12	12–12	50%
US Open	A	1R	1R	1R	2R	3R	1R	1R	1R	1R	2R	4R	2R	4R	A	0 / 13	11–13	46%
Win–loss	0–0	0–1	1–2	0–4	3–4	8–4	7–4	3–4	2–4	6–4	3–4	4–4	9–4	5–4	3–2	0 / 49	54–49	52%
Year-end championships
WTA Elite Trophy^{[1]}	not held			did not qualify								W	SF	DNQ	NH	1 / 2	5–2	71%
National representation
Summer Olympics	not held		A	not held			3R	not held			A	not held				0 / 1	2–1	67%
Fed Cup	A	A	1R	A	1R	PO	PO	PO	F	SF	1R	1R	SF	PO	A	0 / 7	8–8	50%
Premier Mandatory tournaments
Indian Wells Open	A	A	Q1	Q1	2R	3R	4R	3R	2R	1R	1R	3R	3R	3R	NH	0 / 10	13–10	57%
Miami Open	A	A	A	2R	2R	1R	2R	2R	Q2	2R	3R	3R	2R	3R	NH	0 / 10	10–10	50%
Madrid Open	not held			A	A	SF	1R	2R	1R	2R	Q1	1R	3R	1R	NH	0 / 8	8–7	53%
China Open	not Tier I			A	1R	1R	3R	1R	A	1R	1R	2R	3R	1R	NH	0 / 9	5–9	36%
Premier 5 + former Tier I tournaments
Dubai / Qatar Open^{[2]}	not Tier I		1R	1R	A	A	2R	A	A	1R	1R	A	QF	1R	1R	0 / 8	4–8	33%
Italian Open	A	A	A	A	A	A	3R	2R	Q2	Q1	1R	3R	A	2R	1R	0 / 6	6–6	50%
Canadian Open	A	A	A	A	A	2R	1R	1R	Q2	2R	A	1R	3R	2R	NH	0 / 7	5–7	42%
Cincinnati Open	not Tier I			A	A	1R	2R	1R	Q2	1R	Q1	QF	1R	1R	A	0 / 7	4–7	36%
Pan Pac. / Wuhan Open^{[3]}	A	A	A	A	3R	3R	2R	1R	A	2R	1R	2R	2R	A	NH	0 / 8	8–8	50%
German Open	A	Q1	1R	not held												0 / 1	0–1	0%
Win–loss	0–0	0–0	0–2	1–2	4–4	9–7	11–9	5–7	1–2	4–8	2–6	11–8	11–8	4–8	0–2	0 / 74	63–73	46%
Career statistics
	2006	2007	2008	2009	2010	2011	2012	2013	2014	2015	2016	2017	2018	2019	2020	SR	W–L	Win %
Tournaments	0	5	7	11	23	25	26	27	18	20	20	24	24	21	6	Career total: 257		
Titles	0	0	0	0	1	1	0	0	0	0	0	2	2	1	0	Career total: 7		
Finals	0	0	0	0	2	1	2	0	0	0	1	5	3	2	0	Career total: 16		
Hard win–loss	0–0	4–5	5–6	3–6	15–13	18–16	22–17	7–17	6–9	11–13	13–11	35–14	28–14	20–12	5–4	5 / 158	192–157	55%
Clay win–loss	0–0	0–0	0–1	1–2	13–8	18–7	9–9	9–8	5–7	6–7	8–6	9–7	11–7	1–6	1–2	2 / 75	91–77	54%
Grass win–loss	0–0	0–0	1–1	2–2	0–1	2–2	4–2	0–1	0–1	0–1	0–2	4–2	7–3	6–2	0–0	0 / 20	26–20	57%
Carpet win–loss	0–0	0–0	0–0	3–1	1–1	0–0	0–0	0–0	3–1	0–0	0–1	0–0	0–0	discontinued		0 / 4	7–4	64%
Overall win–loss	0–0	4–5	6–8	9–11	29–23	38–25	35–28	16–26	14–18	17–21	21–20	48–23	46–24	27–20	6–6	7 / 257	316–258	55%
Win (%)	–	44%	43%	45%	56%	61%	56%	38%	44%	45%	51%	68%	66%	57%	50%	Career total: 55%		
Year-end ranking	425	131	102	78	40	21	18	73	75	50	54	14	14	28	N/A			

=== Doubles ===
Tournament	2006	2007	2008	2009	2010	2011	2012	2013	2014	2015	2016	2017	2018	2019	2020	SR	W–L	Win %
Grand Slam tournaments
Australian Open	A	A	A	A	1R	3R	2R	2R	2R	SF	SF	1R	A	A	2R	0 / 9	14–9	61%
French Open	A	A	A	A	2R	3R	1R	A	1R	1R	3R	A	A	A	A	0 / 6	5–6	45%
Wimbledon	A	A	Q1	A	QF	1R	1R	QF	QF	1R	SF	3R	A	A	NH	0 / 8	15–8	65%
US Open	A	A	A	1R	3R	2R	QF	2R	1R	1R	3R	1R	A	1R	A	0 / 10	9–10	47%
Win–loss	0–0	0–0	0–0	0–1	6–4	5–4	4–4	5–4	4–3	4–4	12–4	2–3	0–0	0–1	1–1	0 / 33	43–33	57%
Year-end championship
WTA Finals	did not qualify										QF	did not qualify			NH	0 / 1	0–1	0%
National representation
Summer Olympics	not held		A	not held			2R	not held			A	not held				0 / 1	1–1	50%
Fed Cup	A	A	1R	A	1R	PO	PO	PO	F	SF	1R	1R	SF	PO	A	0 / 7	5–4	56%
Premier Mandatory tournaments
Indian Wells Open	A	A	A	A	A	1R	2R	2R	2R	1R	F	1R	A	1R	NH	0 / 8	7–8	47%
Miami Open	A	A	A	A	1R	2R	2R	QF	2R	2R	1R	1R	1R	2R	NH	0 / 10	7–10	41%
Madrid Open	A	A	A	A	A	1R	2R	1R	2R	1R	1R	1R	2R	A	NH	0 / 8	3–8	27%
China Open	not Tier I			A	1R	A	QF	2R	A	QF	QF	QF	A	2R	NH	0 / 7	9–7	56%
Premier 5 + former Tier I tournaments
Dubai / Qatar Open^{[2]}	not Tier I		A	A	A	A	QF	A	A	QF	QF	A	A	A	1R	0 / 4	5–4	56%
Italian Open	A	A	A	A	A	A	2R	1R	SF	QF	2R	1R	A	1R	A	0 / 7	7–7	50%
Canadian Open	A	A	A	A	A	2R	1R	QF	1R	2R	A	2R	2R	2R	NH	0 / 8	7–7	50%
Cincinnati Open	not Tier I			A	A	2R	2R	SF	1R	2R	SF	2R	A	1R	A	0 / 8	9–8	53%
Pan Pac. / Wuhan Open^{[3]}	A	A	A	A	1R	QF	SF	QF	A	QF	2R	1R	A	A	NH	0 / 7	7–7	50%
German Open	A	1R	A	not held												0 / 1	0–1	0%
Win–loss	0–0	0–1	0–0	0–0	0–3	4–6	11–9	9–8	6–6	10–9	12–8	4–8	2–2	3–6	0–1	0 / 68	61–67	48%
Career statistics
	2006	2007	2008	2009	2010	2011	2012	2013	2014	2015	2016	2017	2018	2019	2020	Career		
Tournaments	0	4	1	8	22	18	19	22	18	23	15	12	4	9	4	Career total: 179		
Titles	0	0	0	1	2	0	1	0	0	1	0	0	0	0	0	Career total: 5		
Finals	0	0	0	2	3	2	4	2	1	1	1	0	0	0	0	Career total: 16		
Overall win–loss	0–0	0–4	1–1	11–7	27–20	22–18	31–19	22–22	19–20	25–22	28–15	8–11	2–4	6–8	2–4	204–175		
Win (%)	–	0%	50%	61%	57%	55%	62%	50%	49%	53%	65%	42%	33%	43%	33%	Career total: 54%		
Year-end ranking	569	366	266	68	36	40	21	27	40	24	16	82	299	126	N/A			

Notes
- ^{^{1}} WTA Tournament of Champions was held from 2009 to 2014, when WTA Elite Trophy replaced it.
- ^{^{2}} The first Premier 5 event of the year has switched back and forth between the Dubai Tennis Championships and the Qatar Open since 2009. Dubai was classified as a Premier 5 event from 2009 to 2011 before being succeeded by Doha for the 2012–2014 period. In 2015, Dubai regained its Premier 5 status while Doha was demoted to Premier status. The two tournaments have since alternated status every year.
- ^{^{3}} In 2014, the Pan Pacific Open in Tokyo was downgraded to a Premier event and replaced by the Wuhan Open.

=== Mixed doubles ===
Tournament	2010	2011	2012	2013	2014	2015	2016	2017	2018	2019	2020	SR	W–L
Grand Slam tournaments
Australian Open	A	A	A	A	QF	A	A	A	A	A	A	0 / 1	2–1
French Open	A	A	A	A	F	A	A	A	A	A	NH	0 / 1	4–1
Wimbledon	1R	A	QF	2R	A	A	A	A	A	A	NH	0 / 3	3–3
US Open	A	A	1R	1R	1R	2R	A	A	A	A	NH	0 / 4	1–4
Win–loss	0–1	0–0	2–2	1–2	6–3	1–1	0–0	0–0	0–0	0–0	0–0	0 / 9	10–9

== Significant finals ==
=== Grand Slam finals ===
==== Mixed doubles: 1 (1 runner–up) ====
Result	Year	Championship	Surface	Partner	Opponents	Score
Loss	2014	French Open	Clay	(Serbia) Nenad Zimonjić	(Germany) Anna-Lena Grönefeld (Netherlands) Jean-Julien Rojer	6–4, 2–6, [7–10]

=== WTA Premier Mandatory & Premier 5 finals ===
==== Doubles: 1 (1 runner–up) ====
Result	Year	Tournament	Surface	Partner	Opponents	Score
Loss	2016	Indian Wells Open	Hard	(Czech Republic) Karolína Plíšková	(United States) Bethanie Mattek-Sands (United States) CoCo Vandeweghe	6–4, 4–6, [6–10]

=== WTA Elite Trophy ===
==== Singles: 1 (1 title) ====
Result	Year	Tournament	Surface	Opponent	Score
Win	2017	WTA Elite Trophy, Zhuhai, China	Hard (i)	(United States) CoCo Vandeweghe	7–5, 6–1

== WTA career finals ==
=== Singles: 17 (7 titles, 10 runner-ups) ===
Legend Grand Slam tournaments (0–0) WTA Elite Trophy (1–0) Premier M & Premier 5 (0–0) Premier (2–3) International (4–7)	Finals by surface Hard (5–6) Clay (2–2) Grass (0–2) Carpet (0–0)

Result	W–L	Date	Tournament	Tier	Surface	Opponent	Score
Win	1–0	Jul 2010	Gastein Ladies, Austria	International	Clay	(Switzerland) Timea Bacsinszky	6–1, 6–4
Loss	1–1	Oct 2010	Luxembourg Open, Luxembourg	International	Hard (i)	(Italy) Roberta Vinci	3–6, 4–6
Win	2–1	Apr 2011	Stuttgart Open, Germany	Premier	Clay (i)	(Denmark) Caroline Wozniacki	7–6^{(7–3)}, 6–3
Loss	2–2	Feb 2012	Dubai Championships, UAE	Premier	Hard	(Poland) Agnieszka Radwańska	5–7, 4–6
Loss	2–3	Oct 2012	Linz Open, Austria	International	Hard (i)	(Belarus) Victoria Azarenka	3–6, 4–6
Loss	2–4	Jan 2016	Auckland Open, New Zealand	International	Hard	(United States) Sloane Stephens	5–7, 2–6
Loss	2–5	Jun 2017	Mallorca Open, Spain	International	Grass	(Latvia) Anastasija Sevastova	4–6, 6–3, 3–6
Loss	2–6	Jul 2017	Bucharest Open, Romania	International	Clay	(Romania) Irina-Camelia Begu	3–6, 5–7
Loss	2–7	Aug 2017	Washington Open, US	International	Hard	(Russia) Ekaterina Makarova	6–3, 6–7^{(2–7)}, 0–6
Win	3–7	Oct 2017	Kremlin Cup, Russia	Premier	Hard (i)	(Russia) Daria Kasatkina	6–1, 6–2
Win	4–7	Nov 2017	WTA Elite Trophy, China	Elite Trophy	Hard (i)	(United States) CoCo Vandeweghe	7–5, 6–1
Win	5–7	Jan 2018	Auckland Open, New Zealand	International	Hard	(Denmark) Caroline Wozniacki	6–4, 7–6^{(7–4)}
Loss	5–8	Apr 2018	Charleston Open, US	Premier	Clay	(Netherlands) Kiki Bertens	2–6, 1–6
Win	6–8	Oct 2018	Luxembourg Open, Luxembourg	International	Hard (i)	(Switzerland) Belinda Bencic	6–4, 7–5
Win	7–8	Jan 2019	Auckland Open, New Zealand (2)	International	Hard	(Canada) Bianca Andreescu	2–6, 7–5, 6–1
Loss	7–9	Jun 2019	Birmingham Classic, UK	Premier	Grass	(Australia) Ashleigh Barty	3–6, 5–7
Loss	7–10	Oct 2019	Luxembourg Open, Luxembourg	International	Hard (i)	(Latvia) Jeļena Ostapenko	4–6, 1–6

=== Doubles: 16 (5 titles, 11 runner-ups) ===
Legend Grand Slam tournaments (0–0) Premier M & Premier 5 (0–1) Premier (1–2) International (4–8)	Finals by surface Hard (4–7) Clay (1–3) Grass (0–0) Carpet (0–1)

Result	W–L	Date	Tournament	Tier	Surface	Partner	Opponents	Score
Win	1–0	Jul 2009	Slovenia Open, Slovenia	International	Hard	(Czech Republic) Vladimíra Uhlířová	(France) Camille Pin (Czech Republic) Klára Zakopalová	6–4, 6–2
Loss	1–1	Jul 2009	İstanbul Cup, Turkey	International	Hard	(Switzerland) Patty Schnyder	(Czech Republic) Lucie Hradecká (Czech Republic) Renata Voráčová	6–2, 3–6, [10–12]
Loss	1–2	Jul 2010	Palermo International, Italy	International	Clay	(United States) Jill Craybas	(Italy) Alberta Brianti (Italy) Sara Errani	4–6, 1–6
Win	2–2	Aug 2010	Danish Open, Denmark	International	Hard (i)	(Germany) Anna-Lena Grönefeld	(Russia) Vitalia Diatchenko (Belarus) Tatiana Poutchek	6–4, 6–4
Win	3–2	Sep 2010	Korea Open, South Korea	International	Hard	(Slovenia) Polona Hercog	(South Africa) Natalie Grandin (Czech Republic) Vladimíra Uhlířová	6–3, 6–4
Loss	3–3	Jul 2011	Gastein Ladies, Austria	International	Clay	(Australia) Jarmila Gajdošová	(Czech Republic) Eva Birnerová (Czech Republic) Lucie Hradecká	6–4, 2–6, [10–12]
Loss	3–4	Oct 2011	Linz Open, Austria	International	Hard (i)	(Germany) Anna-Lena Grönefeld	(New Zealand) Marina Erakovic (Russia) Elena Vesnina	5–7, 1–6
Loss	3–5	Jan 2012	Auckland Open, New Zealand	International	Hard	(Italy) Flavia Pennetta	(Czech Republic) Andrea Hlaváčková (Czech Republic) Lucie Hradecká	7–6^{(7–2)}, 2–6, [7–10]
Loss	3–6	Apr 2012	Stuttgart Open, Germany	Premier	Clay (i)	(Germany) Anna-Lena Grönefeld	(Czech Republic) Iveta Benešová (Czech Republic) Barbora Strýcová	4–6, 5–7
Win	4–6	Jun 2012	Gastein Ladies, Austria	International	Clay	(United States) Jill Craybas	(Germany) Anna-Lena Grönefeld (Croatia) Petra Martić	6–7^{(4–7)}, 6–4, [11–9]
Loss	4–7	Oct 2012	Linz Open, Austria	International	Hard (i)	(Czech Republic) Barbora Strýcová	(Germany) Anna-Lena Grönefeld (Czech Republic) Květa Peschke	3–6, 4–6
Loss	4–8	Jan 2013	Auckland Open, New Zealand	International	Hard	(Kazakhstan) Yaroslava Shvedova	(Zimbabwe) Cara Black (Australia) Anastasia Rodionova	6–2, 2–6, [5–10]
Loss	4–9	Jul 2013	Stanford Classic, United States	Premier	Hard	(Croatia) Darija Jurak	(United States) Raquel Kops-Jones (United States) Abigail Spears	2–6, 6–7^{(4–7)}
Loss	4–10	Sep 2014	Tournoi de Québec, Canada	International	Carpet (i)	(Czech Republic) Andrea Hlaváčková	(Czech Republic) Lucie Hradecká (Croatia) Mirjana Lučić-Baroni	3–6, 6–7^{(8–10)}
Win	5–10	Aug 2015	Connecticut Open, United States	Premier	Hard	(Czech Republic) Lucie Hradecká	(Chinese Taipei) Chuang Chia-jung (China) Liang Chen	6–3, 6–1
Loss	5–11	Mar 2016	Indian Wells Open, United States	Premier M	Hard	(Czech Republic) Karolína Plíšková	(United States) Bethanie Mattek-Sands (United States) Coco Vandeweghe	6–4, 4–6, [6–10]

=== Team competition: 1 (1 runner-up) ===
Result	Date	Tournament	Surface	Partners	Opponents	Score
Loss	Nov 2014	Fed Cup, Prague, Czech Republic	Hard (i)	(Germany) Angelique Kerber (Germany) Andrea Petkovic (Germany) Sabine Lisicki	(Czech Republic) Petra Kvitová (Czech Republic) Lucie Šafářová (Czech Republic) Lucie Hradecká (Czech Republic) Andrea Hlaváčková	1–3

== ITF Circuit finals ==
=== Singles: 8 (6 titles, 2 runner-ups) ===
$100,000 tournaments (2–0)
$75,000 tournaments (0–0)
$50,000 tournaments (0–0)
$25,000 tournaments (2–1)
$10,000 tournaments (2–1)

Result	W–L	Date	Tournament	Tier	Surface	Opponent	Score
Win	1–0	Aug 2006	ITF Wahlstedt, Germany	10,000	Clay	(Bulgaria) Maria Geznenge	6–3, 6–2
Win	2–0	Aug 2006	ITF Bielefeld, Germany	10,000	Clay	(Germany) Andrea Sieveke	6–4, 4–6, 6–3
Loss	2–1	Nov 2006	ITF Erding, Germany	10,000	Carpet (i)	(Germany) Carmen Klaschka	4–6, 0–1 ret.
Win	3–1	May 2007	ITF Antalya, Turkey	25,000	Clay	(Germany) Kathrin Wörle-Scheller	7–6^{(7–5)}, 6–4
Win	4–1	Jul 2007	ITF Bucharest, Romania	25,000	Clay	(Bulgaria) Dia Evtimova	6–0, 6–1
Loss	4–2	Jul 2007	ITF Darmstadt, Germany	25,000	Clay	(Germany) Stephanie Gehrlein	0–6, 5–7
Win	5–2	Jul 2009	ITF Biarritz, France	100,000	Clay	(Belarus) Ekaterina Dzehalevich	7–5, 6–0
Win	6–2	Jul 2010	ITF Biarritz, France (2)	100,000	Clay	(Australia) Sophie Ferguson	6–2, 6–2

=== Doubles: 10 (6 titles, 4 runner-ups) ===
$100,000 tournaments (1–2)
$75,000 tournaments (2–0)
$50,000 tournaments (0–1)
$25,000 tournaments (2–0)
$10,000 tournaments (1–1)

Result	W–L	Date	Tournament	Tier	Surface	Partner	Opponents	Score
Loss	0–1	Jul 2006	ITF Horb, Germany	10,000	Clay	(Germany) Lydia Steinbach	(Croatia) Josipa Bek (Bulgaria) Dia Evtimova	6–3, 3–6, 3–6
Win	1–1	Aug 2006	ITF Wahlstedt, Germany	10,000	Clay	(Germany) Laura Siegemund	(Romania) Raluca Ciulei (Serbia) Neda Kozić	6–1, 6–3
Win	2–1	Jul 2007	ITF Bucharest, Romania	25,000	Clay	(Serbia) Vojislava Lukić	(Romania) Laura Ioana Andrei (Romania) Mădălina Gojnea	6–2, 6–4
Win	3–1	Nov 2007	ITF Ismaning, Germany	25,000	Carpet (i)	(Germany) Kristina Barrois	(Czech Republic) Andrea Sestini Hlaváčková (Czech Republic) Lucie Hradecká	2–6, 6–2, [10–7]
Loss	3–2	Nov 2008	ITF Ismaning, Germany	50,000	Carpet (i)	(Germany) Laura Siegemund	(Ukraine) Oxana Lyubtsova (Russia) Ksenia Pervak	2–6, 6–4, [7–10]
Loss	3–3	Apr 2009	ITF Torhout, Belgium	100,000	Hard (i)	(Austria) Sandra Klemenschits	(Netherlands) Michaëlla Krajicek (Belgium) Yanina Wickmayer	4–6, 0–6
Loss	3–4	May 2009	ITF Bucharest, Romania	100,000	Clay	(Austria) Sandra Klemenschits	(Romania) Irina-Camelia Begu (Romania) Simona Halep	6–2, 0–6, [10–12]
Win	4–4	Dec 2009	ITF Dubai, United Arab Emirates	75,000	Hard	(Georgia (country)) Oksana Kalashnikova	(Czech Republic) Vladimíra Uhlířová (Czech Republic) Renata Voráčová	4–6, 6–2, [10–8]
Win	5–4	Jul 2010	ITF Biarritz, France	100,000	Clay	(Canada) Sharon Fichman	(Spain) Lourdes Domínguez Lino (Romania) Monica Niculescu	7–5, 6–4
Win	6–4	Dec 2010	ITF Dubai, United Arab Emirates (2)	75,000	Hard	(Croatia) Petra Martić	(India) Sania Mirza (Czech Republic) Vladimíra Uhlířová	6–4, 7–6^{(9–7)}

== Head-to-head records ==
=== Record against top-10 players ===
Görges' record against players who have been ranked in the top 10.

Player	Years	Record	Win %	Hard	Clay	Grass	Last match
Number 1 ranked players							
(Russia) Dinara Safina	2008–2011	2–1	67%	1–0	1–1	–	Won (6–4, 4–6, 6–4) at 2011 Madrid
(Denmark) Caroline Wozniacki	2010–2020	6–5	55%	3–5	3–0	–	Lost (1–6, 4–6) at 2020 Auckland
(Spain) Garbiñe Muguruza	2012–2017	1–1	50%	–	1–1	–	Lost (5–7, 4–6) at 2017 Rome
(Serbia) Jelena Janković	2009–2017	2–4	33%	1–3	1–0	0–1	Won (2–6, 7–6^{(7–2)}, 6–1) at 2017 Rome
(Australia) Ashleigh Barty	2018–2019	1–2	33%	0–1	–	1–1	Lost (3–6, 5–7) at 2019 Birmingham
(Germany) Angelique Kerber	2010–2012	1–2	33%	1–1	0–1	–	Lost (4–6, 1–6) at 2012 Rome
(Japan) Naomi Osaka	2016–2018	1–2	33%	0–2	1–0	–	Lost (1–6, 2–6) at 2018 Beijing
(Czech Republic) Karolína Plíšková	2014–2018	1–2	33%	0–2	1–0	–	Won (6–4, 6–2) at 2018 Fed Cup
(Romania) Simona Halep	2009–2019	1–3	25%	1–2	0–1	–	Lost (6–7^{(1–7)}, 6–7^{(6–8)}) at 2019 Doha
(Belarus) Victoria Azarenka	2011–2013	1–5	17%	0–3	1–2	–	Lost (2–6, 0–6) at 2013 Rome
(Serbia) Ana Ivanovic	2009–2014	1–5	17%	1–2	0–1	0–2	Lost (6–1, 2–6, 3–6) at 2014 Stuttgart
(Belgium) Kim Clijsters	2012	0–1	0%	0–1	–	–	Lost (2–6, 5–7) at 2012 Miami
(United States) Lindsay Davenport	2008	0–1	0%	0–1	–	–	Lost (1–6, 2–6) at 2008 Fed Cup
(Belgium) Justine Henin	2007–2010	0–2	0%	0–1	0–1	–	Lost (6–7^{(3–7)}, 1–6) at 2010 Stuttgart
(Belarus) Aryna Sabalenka	2018	0–2	0%	0–1	–	0–1	Lost (4–6, 6–7^{(3–7)}) at 2018 New Haven
(United States) Venus Williams	2015–2016	0–2	0%	0–2	–	–	Lost (2–6, 3–6) at 2016 US Open
(Russia) Maria Sharapova	2010–2014	0–4	0%	0–3	0–1	–	Lost (1–6, 4–6) at 2014 Indian Wells
(United States) Serena Williams	2010–2019	0–5	0%	0–1	0–2	0–2	Lost (3–6, 4–6) at 2019 Wimbledon
Number 2 ranked players							
(Estonia) Anett Kontaveit	2017–2018	1–1	50%	1–1	–	–	Lost (2–6, 6–4, 4–6) at 2018 WTA Elite Trophy
(Poland) Agnieszka Radwańska	2012–2017	2–4	33%	1–4	–	1–0	Lost (5–7, 5–7) at 2017 Wuhan
(Russia) Svetlana Kuznetsova	2007–2016	2–5	29%	2–4	0–1	–	Lost (3–6, 3–6) at 2016 Doha
(Czech Republic) Petra Kvitová	2010–2018	1–6	14%	1–3	0–2	0–1	Lost (1–6, 4–6) at 2018 Birmingham
(China) Li Na	2013	0–1	0%	0–1	–	–	Lost (6–7^{(6–8)}, 1–6) at 2013 Australian Open
(Russia) Vera Zvonareva	2007–2019	0–2	0%	0–2	–	–	Lost (6–4, 4–6, 4–6) at 2019 St. Petersburg
Number 3 ranked players							
(Kazakhstan) Elena Rybakina	2018–2019	2–0	100%	2–0	–	–	Won (6–3, 6–4) at 2019 Luxembourg
(Ukraine) Elina Svitolina	2017	2–0	100%	1–0	1–0	–	Won (7–5, 6–4) at 2017 Cincinnati
(Greece) Maria Sakkari	2016–2020	3–2	60%	2–1	0–1	1–0	Lost (4–6, 3–6) at 2020 Doha
(United States) Sloane Stephens	2011–2017	1–5	17%	0–5	1–0	–	Lost (3–6, 6–3, 1–6) at 2017 US Open
(Russia) Nadia Petrova	2013	0–1	0%	0–1	–	–	Lost (1–6, 2–6) at 2013 Indian Wells
Number 4 ranked players							
(United Kingdom) Johanna Konta	2016–2018	2–0	100%	1–0	1–0	–	Won (6–2, 4–6, 6–3) at 2018 Beijing
(Canada) Bianca Andreescu	2019	1–0	100%	1–0	–	–	Won (2–6, 7–5, 6–1) at 2019 Auckland
(Australia) Samantha Stosur	2010–2017	5–1	83%	4–0	1–1	–	Won (4–6, 6–4, 6–4) at 2017 Indian Wells
(Slovakia) Dominika Cibulková	2011–2018	2–1	67%	1–0	1–0	0–1	Won (6–3, 6–1) at 2018 New Haven
(Netherlands) Kiki Bertens	2016–2019	2–2	50%	1–0	0–2	1–0	Won (6–2, 6–3) at 2019 US Open
(Switzerland) Belinda Bencic	2015–2020	2–3	40%	2–2	0–1	–	Lost (6–7^{(6–8)}, 6–7^{(4–7)}) at 2020 Adelaide
(United States) Sofia Kenin	2018–2019	1–2	33%	1–2	–	–	Lost (4–6, 6–7^{(6–8)}) at 2019 Cincinnati
(France) Caroline Garcia	2016–2019	0–3	0%	0–2	0–1	–	Lost (0–6, 5–7) at 2019 Miami
Number 5 ranked players							
(Slovakia) Daniela Hantuchová	2012	2–0	100%	2–0	–	–	Won (6–4, 7–6^{(7–5)}) at 2012 Linz
(Czech Republic) Lucie Šafářová	2009–2018	4–2	67%	3–1	1–0	0–1	Won (2–6, 6–4, 6–3) at 2018 Montreal
(Canada) Eugenie Bouchard	2014–2019	2–1	67%	2–0	0–1	–	Won (3–6, 6–3, 7–6^{(8–6)}) at 2019 Auckland
(Italy) Sara Errani	2009–2015	2–3	40%	1–1	0–2	1–0	Lost (2–6, 2–6) at 2015 French Open
(Latvia) Jeļena Ostapenko	2019	0–1	0%	0–1	–	–	Lost (4–6, 1–6) at 2019 Luxembourg
Number 6 ranked players							
(Spain) Carla Suárez Navarro	2007–2017	3–2	60%	3–0	0–2	–	Won (6–4, 7–6^{(7–5)}) at 2017 Miami
(Czech Republic) Markéta Vondroušová	2018	1–1	50%	1–0	0–1	–	Won (6–3, 3–6, 7–6^{(7–4)}) at 2018 Wuhan
(Italy) Flavia Pennetta	2010–2015	0–3	0%	0–2	0–1	–	Lost (6–2, 6–7^{(3–7)}, 4–6) at 2015 Dubai
Number 7 ranked players							
(Italy) Roberta Vinci	2010–2018	1–3	25%	1–2	0–1	–	Won (7–5, 6–0) at 2018 St. Petersburg
(France) Marion Bartoli	2010–2012	1–4	20%	0–2	1–1	0–1	Lost (3–6, 6–7^{(2–7)}) at 2012 Beijing
(United States) Danielle Collins	2019	0–1	0%	0–1	–	–	Lost (6–2, 6–7^{(5–7)}, 4–6) at 2019 Australian Open
(United States) Madison Keys	2014	0–1	0%	–	0–1	–	Lost (2–6, 6–2, 2–6) at 2014 Strasbourg
Number 8 ranked players							
(Russia) Daria Kasatkina	2015–2018	4–2	67%	2–1	2–1	–	Won (6–4, 6–3) at 2018 Charleston
(Russia) Ekaterina Makarova	2015–2018	1–3	25%	1–3	–	–	Lost (6–7^{(10–12)}, 3–6) at 2018 US Open
Number 9 ranked players							
(United States) CoCo Vandeweghe	2010–2017	3–2	60%	1–2	2–0	–	Won (7–5, 6–1) at 2017 WTA Elite Trophy
(Germany) Andrea Petkovic	2008–2019	2–4	33%	2–3	0–1	–	Lost (6–7^{(2–7)}, 0–6) at 2019 Linz
(Switzerland) Timea Bacsinszky	2010–2015	1–2	33%	0–1	1–0	0–1	Lost (2–6, 5–7) at 2015 Wimbledon
Number 10 ranked players							
(France) Kristina Mladenovic	2013–2018	3–2	60%	1–2	2–0	–	Lost (4–6, 2–3 ret.) at 2018 Cincinnati
(Russia) Maria Kirilenko	2011–2012	0–3	0%	0–2	–	0–1	Lost (6–7^{(5–7)}, 3–6) at 2012 Olympics
Total	2007–2020	77–128	38%	49–83	23–32	5–13	Statistics correct as of 2 October 2023.

=== Record against No. 11–20 players ===
Görges' record against players who have been ranked world No. 11–20.

- (Czech Republic) Barbora Strýcová 6–6
- (Israel) Shahar Pe'er 5–0
- (France) Alizé Cornet 5–1
- (Latvia) Anastasija Sevastova 5–4
- (Russia) Anastasia Pavlyuchenkova 4–3
- (Greece) Eleni Daniilidou 3–0
- (Croatia) Petra Martić 3–0
- (Belgium) Kirsten Flipkens 3–1
- (Croatia) Donna Vekić 3–1
- (Spain) Anabel Medina Garrigues 3–2
- (United States) Alison Riske-Amritraj 3–2
- (Czech Republic) Klára Koukalová 3–3
- (Estonia) Kaia Kanepi 3–4
- (Belgium) Yanina Wickmayer 3–6
- (Austria) Sybille Bammer 2–0
- (Luxembourg) Anne Kremer 2–0
- (France) Aravane Rezaï 2–0
- (Slovenia) Katarina Srebotnik 2–0
- (Romania) Mihaela Buzărnescu 2–1
- (Germany) Sabine Lisicki 2–2
- (Russia) Elena Vesnina 2–4
- (Belgium) Elise Mertens 1–0
- (United States) Alexandra Stevenson 1–0
- (China) Wang Qiang 1–0
- (Australia) Daria Gavrilova 1–1
- (Germany) Anna-Lena Grönefeld 1–1
- (Croatia) Ana Konjuh 1–1
- (France) Virginie Razzano 1–1
- (Slovakia) Magdaléna Rybáriková 1–1
- (Hungary) Ágnes Szávay 1–1
- (China) Zheng Jie 1–2
- (United States) Varvara Lepchenko 1–3
- (Russia) Ekaterina Alexandrova 0–1
- (Croatia) Mirjana Lučić-Baroni 0–1
- (China) Peng Shuai 0–1
- (Spain) María José Martínez Sánchez 0–2
- (Croatia) Karolina Šprem 0–2

* Statistics correct as of 2 October 2023.

== Top 10 wins ==
Görges has a 17–40 record against players who were, at the time the match was played, ranked in the top 10.

Season	2007	2008	2009	2010	2011	2012	2013	2014	2015	2016	2017	2018	2019	2020	Total
Wins	0	0	0	1	4	4	0	1	1	0	3	2	1	0	17

#	Player	Rank	Event	Surface	Round	Score	JG Rank
2010
1.	(Australia) Samantha Stosur	No. 7	Pan Pacific Open, Japan	Hard	2R	7–5, 6–3	No. 42
2011
2.	(Belarus) Victoria Azarenka	No. 5	Stuttgart Open, Germany	Clay (i)	2R	4–6, ret.	No. 32
3.	(Australia) Samantha Stosur	No. 7	Stuttgart Open, Germany	Clay (i)	SF	6–4, 3–6, 7–5	No. 32
4.	(Denmark) Caroline Wozniacki	No. 1	Stuttgart Open, Germany	Clay (i)	F	7–6^{(7–3)}, 6–3	No. 32
5.	(Denmark) Caroline Wozniacki	No. 1	Madrid Open, Spain	Clay	3R	6–4, 1–6, 6–3	No. 27
2012
6.	(Denmark) Caroline Wozniacki	No. 4	Dubai Championships, UAE	Hard	SF	7–6^{(7–3)}, 7–5	No. 19
7.	(France) Marion Bartoli	No. 7	Italian Open	Clay	2R	6–3, 6–1	No. 29
8.	(Poland) Agnieszka Radwańska	No. 2	Summer Olympics, London	Grass	1R	7–5, 6–7^{(5–7)}, 6–4	No. 24
9.	(Australia) Samantha Stosur	No. 9	China Open	Hard	2R	7–6^{(7–2)}, 4–6, 7–5	No. 21
2014
10.	(Italy) Sara Errani	No. 7	Australian Open	Hard	1R	6–3, 6–2	No. 73
2015
11.	(Denmark) Caroline Wozniacki	No. 5	French Open	Clay	2R	6–3, 7–6^{(7–4)}	No. 72
2017
12.	(Poland) Agnieszka Radwańska	No. 10	Cincinnati Open, United States	Hard	1R	6–4, 6–4	No. 37
13.	(Ukraine) Elina Svitolina	No. 4	Cincinnati Open, United States	Hard	3R	7–5, 6–4	No. 37
14.	(France) Kristina Mladenovic	No. 10	WTA Elite Trophy, China	Hard	RR	6–2, 7–6^{(7–4)}	No. 18
2018
15.	(Denmark) Caroline Wozniacki	No. 3	Auckland Open, New Zealand	Hard	F	6–4, 7–6^{(7–4)}	No. 14
16.	(Czech Republic) Karolina Plíšková	No. 6	Fed Cup, Stuttgart, Germany	Clay (i)	SF	6–4, 6–2	No. 11
2019
17.	(Netherlands) Kiki Bertens	No. 7	US Open	Hard	3R	6–2, 6–3	No. 30

== Longest winning streak ==
=== 15-match win streak (2017–18) ===
#	Tournament	Category	Start date	Surface	Rd	Opponent	Rank	Score
–	China Open	Premier Mandatory	2 October 2017	Hard	2R	(Czech Republic) Barbora Strýcová	No. 29	4–6, 2–6
1	Kremlin Cup	Premier	16 October 2017	Hard (i)	1R	(Russia) Polina Monova (Q)	No. 186	6–0, 6–3
2	Kremlin Cup	Premier	16 October 2017	Hard (i)	2R	(Kazakhstan) Yulia Putintseva	No. 53	6–3, 6–3
3	Kremlin Cup	Premier	16 October 2017	Hard (i)	QF	(Ukraine) Lesia Tsurenko	No. 50	6–3, 6–4
4	Kremlin Cup	Premier	16 October 2017	Hard (i)	SF	(Russia) Natalia Vikhlyantseva	No. 67	6–2, 2–6, 7–5
5	Kremlin Cup	Premier	16 October 2017	Hard (i)	F	(Russia) Daria Kasatkina	No. 28	6–1, 6–2
6	WTA Elite Trophy	WTA Elite Trophy	31 October 2017	Hard (i)	RR	(France) Kristina Mladenovic (1)	No. 10	6–2, 7–6^{(7–4)}
7	WTA Elite Trophy	WTA Elite Trophy	31 October 2017	Hard (i)	RR	(Slovakia) Magdaléna Rybáriková (10)	No. 22	6–1, 7–6^{(7–5)}
8	WTA Elite Trophy	WTA Elite Trophy	31 October 2017	Hard (i)	SF	(Latvia) Anastasija Sevastova (5)	No. 15	6–3, 6–3
9	WTA Elite Trophy	WTA Elite Trophy	31 October 2017	Hard (i)	F	(United States) CoCo Vandeweghe (2)	No. 12	7–5, 6–1
10	ASB Classic	International	1 January 2018	Hard	1R	(Puerto Rico) Monica Puig	No. 57	6–4, 4–6, 6–2
11	ASB Classic	International	1 January 2018	Hard	2R	(Slovakia) Viktória Kužmová (Q)	No. 138	6–4, 6–0
12	ASB Classic	International	1 January 2018	Hard	QF	(Slovenia) Polona Hercog	No. 100	6–4, 6–4
13	ASB Classic	International	1 January 2018	Hard	SF	(Chinese Taipei) Hsieh Su-wei	No. 103	6–1, 6–4
14	ASB Classic	International	1 January 2018	Hard	F	(Denmark) Caroline Wozniacki (1)	No. 3	6–4, 7–6^{(7–4)}
15	Australian Open	Grand Slam	15 January 2018	Hard	1R	(United States) Sofia Kenin	No. 102	6–4, 6–4
–	Australian Open	Grand Slam	15 January 2018	Hard	2R	(France) Alizé Cornet	No. 42	4–6, 3–6
