= Timea Bacsinszky career statistics =

Career finals
Discipline	Type	Won	Lost	Total	WR (Note: Winning rate)
Singles	Grand Slam	–	–	–	–
Singles	Summer Olympics	–	–	–	–
Singles	WTA Finals (Note: Formerly known as: Virginia Slims Championships (until 1995); WTA Tour Championships (until 2014))	–	–	–	–
Singles	WTA Elite (Note: Elite tier: WTA Tournament of Champions (2009–14); WTA Elite Trophy (2015–present))	–	–	–	–
Singles	WTA 1000 (Note: Formerly known as: Category 4 & 5 & 6 (until 1990); Tier I (until 2009); Premier Mandatory and Premier 5 (until 2021))	0	1	1	0.00
Singles	WTA 500 (Note: Formerly known as: Category 3 (until 1990); Tier II (until 2009); Premier (until 2021))	–	–	–	–
Singles	WTA 250 (Note: Formerly known as: Category 1 & 2 (until 1990); Tier III & IV & V (until 2009); WTA International (until 2021))	4	2	6	0.67
Singles	Total	4	3	7	0.57
Doubles	Grand Slam	–	–	–	–
Doubles	Summer Olympics	–	–	–	–
Doubles	WTA Finals	–	–	–	–
Doubles	WTA Elite	–	–	–	–
Doubles	WTA 1000	–	–	–	–
Doubles	WTA 500	1	0	1	1.00
Doubles	WTA 250	4	4	8	0.50
Doubles	Total	5	4	9	0.56
Total		9	7	16	0.56

This is a list of career statistics of Swiss professional tennis player Timea Bacsinszky since her professional debut in 2004. Bacsinszky has won four singles titles and five doubles titles on the WTA Tour. She also partnered Martina Hingis to win a silver medal in women's doubles at the 2016 Summer Olympics.

== Performance timelines ==
Key
W	F	SF	QF	#R	RR	Q#	DNQ	A	NH

(W) winner; (F) finalist; (SF) semifinalist; (QF) quarterfinalist; (#R) rounds 4, 3, 2, 1; (RR) round-robin stage; (Q#) qualification round; (DNQ) did not qualify; (A) absent; (NH) not held; (SR) strike rate (events won / competed); (W–L) win–loss record.
To avoid confusion and double counting, these charts are updated at the conclusion of a tournament or when the player's participation has ended.

Only main-draw results in WTA Tour, Grand Slam tournaments, Billie Jean King Cup (Fed Cup), Hopman Cup and Olympic Games are included in win–loss records.

=== Singles ===
Tournament	2004	2005	2006	2007	2008	2009	2010	2011	2012	2013	2014	2015	2016	2017	2018	2019	SR	W–L	Win %
Grand Slam tournaments
Australian Open	A	Q1	A	Q3	2R	A	1R	1R	A	A	A	3R	2R	3R	A	3R	0 / 7	8–7	53%
French Open	A	A	A	2R	2R	2R	2R	A	A	Q1	2R	SF	QF	SF	A	Q2	0 / 8	19–8	70%
Wimbledon	A	A	A	1R	2R	2R	1R	A	A	Q2	2R	QF	3R	3R	A	1R	0 / 9	11–9	55%
US Open	A	A	A	1R	3R	2R	1R	A	1R	A	2R	1R	2R	A	1R	1R	0 / 10	5–10	33%
Win–loss	0–0	0–0	0–0	1–3	5–4	3–3	1–4	0–1	0–1	0–0	3–3	11–4	8–4	9–3	0–1	2–3	0 / 34	43–34	56%
Year-end championships
WTA Finals	DNQ											Alt/A	DNQ				0 / 0	0–0	–
WTA Elite Trophy	NH					DNQ						A	RR	DNQ			0 / 1	1–1	50%
National representation
Summer Olympics	A	NH			1R	NH			A	NH			1R	NH			0 / 2	0–2	0%
Billie Jean King Cup	A	PO	WGII	A	A	WGII	A	A	WGII	A	WGII	PO	SF	SF	QF	PO	0 / 3	20–19	51%
WTA 1000
Dubai / Qatar Open (Note: The first Premier 5 event of the year has switched back and forth between the Dubai Tennis Championships and the Qatar Ladies Open since 2009. Dubai was classified as a Premier 5 event from 2009 to 2011 before being succeeded by Doha for the 2012–2014 period. In 2015, Dubai regained its Premier 5 status while Doha was demoted to Premier status. The Premier 5 tournaments were reclassified as WTA 1000 tournaments in 2021.)	NMS				A	A	1R	2R	A	A	A	A	3R	A	A	A	0 / 3	3–3	50%
Indian Wells Open	A	A	A	A	A	2R	1R	2R	2R	A	A	QF	4R	4R	1R	Q2	0 / 8	10–8	56%
Miami Open	A	A	A	A	Q1	1R	4R	2R	A	A	A	A	SF	A	1R	A	0 / 5	8–5	62%
Madrid Open	NH					A	Q1	A	A	A	A	1R	3R	2R	A	A	0 / 3	3–3	50%
Italian Open	A	A	A	A	Q1	A	2R	A	1R	A	A	3R	QF	3R	A	A	0 / 5	8–5	62%
Canadian Open	A	A	A	A	A	A	2R	A	A	A	1R	1R	A	A	A	A	0 / 3	1–3	25%
Cincinnati Open	NMS					A	A	A	A	A	Q1	1R	3R	A	A	A	0 / 2	1–2	33%
Pan Pacific / Wuhan Open (Note: In 2014, the Pan Pacific Open was downgraded to a Premier event and replaced by the Wuhan Open. The Premier 5 tournaments were reclassified as WTA 1000 tournaments in 2021.)	A	A	A	A	A	A	1R	A	A	A	QF	A	1R	A	A	A	0 / 3	3–3	50%
China Open	NMS					A	QF	A	1R	A	A	F	2R	A	A	A	0 / 4	9–4	69%
Career statistics
	2004	2005	2006	2007	2008	2009	2010	2011	2012	2013	2014	2015	2016	2017	2018	2019	SR	W–L	Win %
Tournaments	2	0	3	6	16	11	21	6	6	1	10	16	20	9	8	10	Career total: 145		
Titles	0	0	0	0	0	1	0	0	0	0	0	2	1	0	0	0	Career total: 4		
Finals	0	0	0	0	0	1	1	0	0	0	0	4	1	0	0	0	Career total: 7		
Hard win–loss	0–1	0–0	3–2	0–2	6–8	10–7	9–12	3–5	1–3	0–1	7–8	28–9	13–17	7–4	3–7	4–8	3 / 86	94–94	50%
Clay win–loss	0–1	1–1	1–2	2–3	6–7	6–3	10–7	0–0	1–4	0–0	3–2	9–4	17–4	9–4	0–2	2–3	1 / 45	67–47	59%
Grass win–loss	0–0	0–0	0–0	0–1	1–1	1–1	0–1	0–0	0–0	0–0	1–1	4–1	2–2	2–2	0–0	0–1	0 / 11	11–11	50%
Carpet win–loss	0–0	0–0	0–0	0–0	0–0	0–1	0–1	0–1	0–0	0–0	0–0	0–0	0–0	0–0	0–0	Disc.	0 / 3	0–3	0%
Overall win–loss	0–2	1–1	4–4	2–6	13–16	17–12	19–21	3–6	2–7	0–1	11–11	41–14	32–23	18–10	3–9	6–12	4 / 145	171–155	52%
Year-end ranking	247	392	121	123	53	54	51	242	185	285	48	12	15	39	241	125	$6,665,012		

=== Doubles ===
Tournament	2008	2009	2010	2011	2012	2013	2014	2015	2016	2017	2018	2019	W–L
Grand Slam tournaments
Australian Open	A	A	2R	2R	A	A	A	1R	A	A	A	1R	2–4
French Open	2R	A	1R	A	A	A	A	2R	A	A	A	A	2–3
Wimbledon	1R	A	2R	A	A	A	Q2	1R	A	A	A	1R	1–4
US Open	1R	1R	3R	A	A	A	1R	2R	A	A	3R	A	5–6
Win–loss	1–3	0–1	4–4	1–1	0–0	0–0	0–1	2–4	0–0	0–	2–1	0–2	10–17

== Significant finals ==
=== WTA 1000 ===
==== Singles: 1 (runner-up) ====
Result	Year	Tournament	Surface	Opponent	Score
Loss	2015	China Open	Hard	(Spain) Garbiñe Muguruza	5–7, 4–6

=== Olympic medal matches ===
==== Doubles: 1 (silver) ====
Result	Year	Tournament	Surface	Partner	Opponents	Score
Silver	2016	Rio Summer Olympics	Hard	(Switzerland) Martina Hingis	(Russia) Ekaterina Makarova (Russia) Elena Vesnina	4–6, 4–6

== WTA Tour finals ==
=== Singles: 7 (4 titles, 3 runner-ups) ===
Legend WTA 1000 (Premier M) (0–1) WTA 250 (International) (4–2)	Finals by surface Hard (3–2) Clay (1–1)

Result	W–L	Date	Tournament	Tier	Surface	Opponent	Score
Win	1–0	Oct 2009	Luxembourg Open, Luxembourg	International	Hard (i)	(Germany) Sabine Lisicki	6–2, 7–5
Loss	1–1	Jul 2010	Gastein Ladies, Austria	International	Clay	(Germany) Julia Görges	1–6, 4–6
Loss	1–2	Jan 2015	Shenzhen Open, China	International	Hard	(Romania) Simona Halep	2–6, 2–6
Win	2–2	Feb 2015	Mexican Open, Mexico	International	Hard	(France) Caroline Garcia	6–3, 6–0
Win	3–2	Mar 2015	Monterrey Open, Mexico	International	Hard	(France) Caroline Garcia	4–6, 6–2, 6–4
Loss	3–3	Oct 2015	China Open, China	Premier M	Hard	(Spain) Garbiñe Muguruza	5–7, 4–6
Win	4–3	Apr 2016	Morocco Open, Morocco	International	Clay	(New Zealand) Marina Erakovic	6–2, 6–1

=== Doubles: 9 (5 titles, 4 runner-ups) ===
Legend WTA 500 (Premier) (1–0) WTA 250 (International) (4–4)	Finals by surface Hard (3–1) Clay (2–3)

Result	W–L	Date	Tournament	Tier	Surface	Partner	Opponents	Score
Loss	0–1	Apr 2010	Barcelona Ladies Open, Spain	International	Clay	(Italy) Tathiana Garbin	(Italy) Sara Errani (Italy) Roberta Vinci	1–6, 6–3, [2–10]
Win	1–1	Jul 2010	Budapest Grand Prix, Hungary	International	Clay	(Italy) Tathiana Garbin	(Romania) Sorana Cîrstea (Spain) Anabel Medina Garrigues	6–3, 6–3
Win	2–1	Jul 2010	Prague Open, Czech Republic	International	Clay	(Italy) Tathiana Garbin	(Romania) Monica Niculescu (Hungary) Ágnes Szávay	7–5, 7–6^{(7–4)}
Loss	2–2	Jul 2010	Gastein Ladies, Austria	International	Clay	(Italy) Tathiana Garbin	(Czech Republic) Lucie Hradecká (Spain) Anabel Medina Garrigues	7–6^{(7–2)}, 1–6, [5–10]
Win	3–2	Oct 2010	Luxembourg Open, Luxembourg	International	Hard (i)	(Italy) Tathiana Garbin	(Czech Republic) Iveta Benešová (Czech Republic) Barbora Záhlavová-Strýcová	6–4, 6–4
Win	4–2	Oct 2014	Luxembourg Open, Luxembourg (2)	International	Hard (i)	(Germany) Kristina Barrois	(Czech Republic) Lucie Hradecká (Czech Republic) Barbora Krejčíková	3–6, 6–4, [10–4]
Loss	4–3	Apr 2017	Ladies Open Biel Bienne, Switzerland	International	Hard (i)	(Switzerland) Martina Hingis	(Chinese Taipei) Hsieh Su-wei (Romania) Monica Niculescu	7–5, 3–6, [7–10]
Win	5–3	Feb 2018	St. Petersburg Trophy, Russia	Premier	Hard (i)	(Russia) Vera Zvonareva	(Russia) Alla Kudryavtseva (Slovenia) Katarina Srebotnik	2–6, 6–1, [10–3]
Loss	5–4	Jul 2018	Swiss Open, Switzerland	International	Clay	(Spain) Lara Arruabarrena	(Chile) Alexa Guarachi (United States) Desirae Krawczyk	6–4, 4–6, [6–10]

== WTA Challenger finals ==
=== Doubles: 2 (1 title, 1 runner-up) ===
Result	W–L	Date	Tournament	Surface	Partner	Opponents	Score
Loss	0–1	Nov 2018	Open de Limoges, France	Hard (i)	(Russia) Vera Zvonareva	(Russia) Veronika Kudermetova (Kazakhstan) Galina Voskoboeva	5–7, 4–6
Win	1–1	Jun 2019	Bol Ladies Open, Croatia	Clay	(Luxembourg) Mandy Minella	(Sweden) Cornelia Lister (Czech Republic) Renata Voráčová	0–6, 7–6^{(7–3)}, [10–4]

== ITF Circuit finals ==
Legend
$100,000 tournaments
$75/80,000 tournaments
$50,000 tournaments
$25,000 tournaments
$10/15,000 tournaments

=== Singles: 20 (13 titles, 7 runner-ups) ===
Result	W–L	Date	Tournament	Tier	Surface	Opponent	Score
Win	1–0	Aug 2003	ITF Wrexham, United Kingdom	10,000	Hard	(United Kingdom) Karen Paterson	6–0, 6–3
Win	2–0	Apr 2004	Open de Saint-Malo, France	50,000	Clay (i)	(Israel) Tzipora Obziler	6–2, 6–1
Win	3–0	Sep 2004	ITF Martina Franca, Italy	25,000	Clay	(Morocco) Bahia Mouhtassine	6–4, 6–4
Loss	3–1	Apr 2005	Open de Biarritz, France	25,000	Clay	(Germany) Martina Müller	6–4, 6–7^{(2–7)}, 2–6
Win	4–1	Apr 2006	ITF Dinan, France	75,000	Clay (i)	(Russia) Yaroslava Shvedova	4–6, 7–5, 6–2
Win	5–1	May 2006	Open Saint-Gaudens, France	50,000	Clay	(Croatia) Ivana Abramović	7–5, 6–4
Win	6–1	May 2007	Open de Cagnes-sur-Mer, France	100,000	Clay	(Germany) Tatjana Malek	6–4, 6–1
Win	7–1	Jul 2012	ITF Rovereto, Italy	10,000	Clay	(Germany) Anne Schäfer	6–0, 6–2
Win	8–1	Sep 2012	ITF Mont-de-Marsan, France	25,000	Clay	(Brazil) Teliana Pereira	6–2, 3–6, 6–2
Win	9–1	Oct 2012	ITF Brasília, Brazil	25,000	Clay	(Romania) Raluca Olaru	7–5, 6–2
Loss	9–2	Feb 2013	ITF Kreuzlingen, Switzerland	10,000	Carpet (i)	(Russia) Ekaterina Alexandrova	4–6, 3–6
Win	10–2	Jul 2013	Contrexéville Open, France	50,000	Clay	(Spain) Beatriz García Vidagany	6–1, 6–1
Loss	10–3	Nov 2013	ITF Équeurdreville, France	25,000	Hard	(France) Amandine Hesse	6–7^{(5–7)}, 6–3, 4–6
Win	11–3	Jan 2014	Open Andrézieux-Bouthéon, France	25,000	Hard (i)	(Belgium) Ysaline Bonaventure	6–1, 6–1
Win	12–3	Feb 2014	ITF Tallinn, Estonia	15,000	Hard (i)	(Estonia) Anett Kontaveit	6–3, 6–3
Loss	12–4	Feb 2014	ITF Kreuzlingen, Switzerland	25,000	Carpet (i)	(Netherlands) Michaëlla Krajicek	4–6, 6–7^{(5–7)}
Loss	12–5	May 2014	Open de Cagnes-sur-Mer, France	100,000	Clay	(Canada) Sharon Fichman	2–6, 2–6
Loss	12–6	Jun 2014	Nottingham Challenge, United Kingdom	50,000	Grass	(Australia) Jarmila Gajdošová	2–6, 2–6
Loss	12–7	Sep 2018	Open de Biarritz, France	80,000	Clay	(Germany) Tamara Korpatsch	2–6, 5–7
Win	13–7	Nov 2018	Open Nantes Atlantique, France	25,000	Hard (i)	(France) Amandine Hesse	6–4, 3–6, 6–1

=== Doubles: 22 (14 titles, 8 runner-ups) ===
Result	W–L	Date	Tournament	Tier	Surface	Partner	Opponents	Score
Loss	0–1	Apr 2005	Open de Biarritz, France	25,000	Clay	(France) Aurélie Védy	(France) Stéphanie Cohen (Tunisia) Selima Sfar	2–6, 1–6
Win	1–1	Nov 2005	ITF Opole, Poland	25,000	Carpet (i)	(Belarus) Nadejda Ostrovskaya	(Czech Republic) Lucie Hradecká (Czech Republic) Gabriela Navrátilová	6–4, 7–6^{(5)}
Win	2–1	Feb 2006	ITF Stockholm, Italy	25,000	Hard (i)	(France) Aurélie Védy	(South Africa) Surina De Beer (United Kingdom) Anne Keothavong	6–4, 6–4
Win	3–1	Apr 2007	Open de Cagnes-sur-Mer, France	100,000	Hard	(France) Aurélie Védy	(Slovakia) Katarína Kachlíková (Russia) Anastasia Pavlyuchenkova	7–5, 7–5
Loss	3–2	Sep 2007	Open Porte du Hainaut, France	75,000	Clay	(Poland) Karolina Kosińska	(Czech Republic) Eva Hrdinová (Canada) Marie-Ève Pelletier	3–6, 2–6
Win	4–2	Sep 2007	Open Bordeaux Aquitaine, France	100,000	Clay	(Germany) Sandra Klösel	(Russia) Alisa Kleybanova (Italy) Nathalie Viérin	7–6^{(2)}, 6–4
Loss	4–3	Jun 2009	Open de Marseille, France	100,000	Clay	(Russia) Elena Bovina	(Italy) Tathiana Garbin (Argentina) María Emilia Salerni	7–6^{(4)}, 3–6, [7–10]
Win	5–3	Sep 2009	Sofia Cup, Bulgaria	100,000	Clay	(Italy) Tathiana Garbin	(Slovenia) Polona Hercog (Croatia) Petra Martić	6–2, 7–6^{(4)}
Win	6–3	Sep 2009	Open de Saint-Malo, France	100,000	Clay	(Italy) Tathiana Garbin	(Slovenia) Andreja Klepač (France) Aurélie Védy	6–3, ret.
Loss	6–4	Oct 2009	Athens Open, Greece	100,000	Hard	(Italy) Tathiana Garbin	(Slovenia) Eleni Daniilidou (Germany) Jasmin Wöhr	2–6, 7–5, [4–10]
Win	7–4	Nov 2009	Internazionali di Ortisei, Italy	100,000	Carpet (i)	(Italy) Tathiana Garbin	(Kazakhstan) Galina Voskoboeva (Czech Republic) Barbora Strýcová	6–2, 6–2
Win	8–4	Oct 2010	Torhout Open, Belgium	100,000	Hard (i)	(Italy) Tathiana Garbin	(Netherlands) Michaëlla Krajicek (Belgium) Yanina Wickmayer	6–4, 6–2
Loss	8–5	Jul 2012	ITF Les Contamines-Montjoie, France	25,000	Hard	(France) Estelle Guisard Diemer	(Switzerland) Conny Perrin (Slovenia) Maša Zec Peškirič	6–2, 4–6, [5–10]
Win	9–5	Sep 2012	ITF Mont-de-Marsan, France	25,000	Clay	(Romania) Mihaela Buzărnescu	(Bulgaria) Aleksandrina Naydenova (Brazil) Teliana Pereira	6–4, 6–1
Win	10–5	Oct 2012	Suzhou Ladies Open, China	100,000	Hard	(France) Caroline Garcia	(China) Yang Zhaoxuan (China) Zhao Yijing	7–5, 6–3
Loss	10–6	Oct 2012	ITF Brasília, Brazil	25,000	Clay	(United States) Julia Cohen	(Romania) Elena Bogdan (Romania) Raluca Olaru	3–6, 6–3, [8–10]
Win	11–6	Feb 2013	ITF Kreuzlingen, Switzerland	10,000	Carpet (i)	(Switzerland) Xenia Knoll	(Croatia) Matea Mezak (Croatia) Silvia Njirić	6–2, 6–3
Win	12–6	Oct 2013	ITF Budapest, Hungary	25,000	Clay	(Switzerland) Xenia Knoll	(Hungary) Réka Luca Jani (Ukraine) Veronika Kapshay	7–6^{(2)}, 6–2
Win	13–6	Nov 2013	ITF Équeurdreville, France	25,000	Hard (i)	(Germany) Kristina Barrois	(Latvia) Diāna Marcinkēviča (Netherlands) Eva Wacanno	6–4, 6–3
Win	14–6	Nov 2013	Soho Square Tournament, Egypt	75,000	Clay	(Germany) Kristina Barrois	(Russia) Anna Morgina (Czech Republic) Kateřina Siniaková	6–7^{(5)}, 6–0, [10–4]
Loss	14–7	Jan 2014	Open Andrézieux-Bouthéon, France	25,000	Hard (i)	(Germany) Kristina Barrois	(Ukraine) Yuliya Beygelzimer (Ukraine) Kateryna Kozlova	3–6, 6–3, [8–10]
Loss	14–8	Mar 2014	ITF Preston, United Kingdom	25,000	Hard (i)	(Germany) Kristina Barrois	(United Kingdom) Tara Moore (Russia) Marta Sirotkina	6–3, 1–6, [11–13]

== Grand Slam tournament seedings ==
Year	Australian Open	French Open	Wimbledon	US Open
2007	did not qualify	qualifier	not seeded	not seeded
2008	qualifier	not seeded	not seeded	not seeded
2009	absent	not seeded	not seeded	not seeded
2010	not seeded	not seeded	not seeded	not seeded
2011	not seeded	absent	absent	absent
2012	absent	absent	absent	protected ranking
2013	absent	did not qualify	did not qualify	absent
2014	absent	qualifier	qualifier	not seeded
2015	not seeded	23rd	15th	14th
2016	11th	8th	11th	15th
2017	12th	30th	19th	absent
2018	absent	absent	absent	protected ranking
2019	protected ranking	did not qualify	not seeded	not seeded

== Wins against top 10 players ==
#	Player	Rk	Tournament	Surface	Rd	Score	Rk	Ref
2008
1.	(Slovakia) Daniela Hantuchová	8	Diamond Games, Belgium	Hard (i)	QF	6–2, 4–6, 4–1 ret.		
2010
2.	(Belarus) Victoria Azarenka	10	China Open, China	Hard	2R	4–6, 3–2 ret.		
2014
3.	(Russia) Maria Sharapova	4	Wuhan Open, China	Hard	3R	7–6^{(7–3)}, 7–5		
2015
4.	(Czech Republic) Petra Kvitová	4	Shenzhen Open, China	Hard	SF	6–4, 6–4		
5.	(Russia) Ekaterina Makarova	8	Indian Wells Open, US	Hard	3R	3–6, 7–5, 6–4		
6.	(Poland) Agnieszka Radwańska	9	Fed Cup, Poland	Hard (i)	RR	6–1, 6–1		
7.	(Czech Republic) Petra Kvitová	4	French Open, France	Clay	4R	2–6, 6–0, 6–3		
2016
8.	(Poland) Agnieszka Radwańska	2	Miami Open, United States	Hard	4R	2–6, 6–4, 6–2		
9.	(Romania) Simona Halep	5	Miami Open, United States	Hard	QF	4–6, 6–3, 6–2		
2017
10.	(Spain) Garbiñe Muguruza	6	Madrid Open, Spain	Clay	1R	6–1, 6–3		
2019
11.	(Russia) Daria Kasatkina	10	Australian Open, Australia	Hard	1R	6–3, 6–0		
