= 2011 Gastein Ladies =

Women's tennis tournament in Austria

- Date: 11–18 July
- Edition: 5th
- Category: WTA International
- Draw: 32S / 16D
- Prize money: $220,000
- Surface: Clay / outdoor
- Location: Bad Gastein, Austria

Champions

Singles
- (Spain) María José Martínez Sánchez

Doubles
- (Czech Republic) Eva Birnerová / (Czech Republic) Lucie Hradecká
← 2010 ·	Gastein Ladies	· 2012 →

The 2011 Gastein Ladies was a professional women's tennis tournament played on outdoor clay courts. It was the fifth edition of the tournament which was part of the WTA International series of the 2011 WTA Tour. It took place in Bad Gastein, Austria between 11 and 18 July 2011. Unseeded María José Martínez Sánchez won the singles title.

== Finals ==
=== Singles ===
(Spain) María José Martínez Sánchez defeated (Austria) Patricia Mayr-Achleitner, 6–0, 7–5

- It was her first title of the year and fourth of her career.

=== Doubles ===
(Czech Republic) Eva Birnerová / (Czech Republic) Lucie Hradecká defeated (Australia) Jarmila Gajdošová / (Germany) Julia Görges, 4–6, 6–2, [12–10]

== WTA entrants ==
=== Seeds ===
Country	Player	Rank^{1}	Seed
GER	Julia Görges	16	1
AUS	Jarmila Gajdošová	29	2
CZE	Lucie Hradecká	42	3
CZE	Iveta Benešová	44	4
ESP	Lourdes Domínguez Lino	45	5
AUS	Jelena Dokić	47	6
LAT	Anastasija Sevastova	51	7
ROU	Monica Niculescu	52	8

- ^{1} Rankings are as of July 4, 2011.

=== Other entrants ===
The following players received wildcards into the singles main draw:

- (Austria) Nikola Hofmanova
- (Austria) Melanie Klaffner
- (Austria) Patricia Mayr-Achleitner

The following players received entry from the qualifying draw:

- (Bulgaria) Dia Evtimova
- (Slovenia) Nastja Kolar
- (Argentina) Paula Ormaechea
- (Georgia (country)) Sofia Shapatava
