= 2017 China Open =

2017 China Open may refer to:

- 2017 China Open (snooker)
- 2017 China Open (tennis)
