= 2012 Gastein Ladies – Singles =

Singles
- 2012 Gastein Ladies

Final
- Champion: (France) Alizé Cornet
- Runner-up: (Belgium) Yanina Wickmayer
- Score: 7–5, 7–6^{(7–1)}

Details
- Draw: 32
- Seeds: 8

Events
Singles	Doubles
- Gastein Ladies

María José Martínez Sánchez was the defending champion but decided not to participate.
Alizé Cornet won the title defeating Yanina Wickmayer in the final, 7–5, 7–6^{(7–1)}

== Seeds ==
1. (Germany) Julia Görges (first round)
2. (Belgium) Yanina Wickmayer (final)
3. (Kazakhstan) Ksenia Pervak (semifinals)
4. (Spain) Carla Suárez Navarro (second round)
5. (Croatia) Petra Martić (first round)
6. (Romania) Irina-Camelia Begu (second round)
7. (France) Alizé Cornet (champion)
8. (Sweden) Johanna Larsson (quarterfinals)

== Draw ==
Key

- Q = Qualifier
- WC = Wild card
- LL = Lucky loser
- Alt = Alternate
- ITF = ITF entry
- PR = Protected ranking
- SR = Special ranking
- SE = Special exempt
- JE = Junior exempt
- JR = Junior Accelerator Programme entrant
- CO = College Accelerator Programme entrant
- NG = Next Gen Accelerator Program entrant
- w/o = Walkover
- r = Retired
- d = Defaulted

=== Finals ===
Semifinals
7	(France) Alizé Cornet	6	6
3	(Kazakhstan) Ksenia Pervak	2	2
(Luxembourg) Mandy Minella	6^{3}	3
2/WC	(Belgium) Yanina Wickmayer	7^{7}	6

Final
7	(France) Alizé Cornet	7	7^{7}
2/WC	(Belgium) Yanina Wickmayer	5	6^{1}

=== Top half ===
First round
1	(Germany) J Görges	6	3	3
Q	(Netherlands) R Hogenkamp	3	6	6
(Spain) E Cabeza Candela	3	6	6
(Spain) L Pous Tió	6	3	3
(Ukraine) Y Beygelzimer	6	3	1
(Australia) S Jones	4	6	6
(Romania) E Gallovits-Hall	5	5
7	(France) A Cornet	7	7
3	(Kazakhstan) K Pervak	3	6	7^{7}
(Spain) L Arruabarrena Vecino	6	3	6^{3}
(Germany) S Gronert	6	6
(Czech Republic) E Birnerová	2	0
Q	(United States) C Scholl	6	6
(Czech Republic) Z Ondrášková	3	0
(Germany) K Wörle	5	6	3
6	(Romania) I-C Begu	7	1	6

Second round
Q	(Netherlands) R Hogenkamp	4	3
(Spain) E Cabeza Candela	6	6
(Australia) S Jones	3	2
7	(France) A Cornet	6	6
3	(Kazakhstan) K Pervak	6	6
(Germany) S Gronert	2	3
Q	(United States) C Scholl	6	6
6	(Romania) I-C Begu	3	4

Quarterfinals
(Spain) E Cabeza Candela	1	2
7	(France) A Cornet	6	6
3	(Kazakhstan) K Pervak	6	6
Q	(United States) C Scholl	4	1

Semifinals
7	(France) A Cornet	6	6
3	(Kazakhstan) K Pervak	2	2

=== Bottom half ===
First round
8	(Sweden) J Larsson	6	7^{7}
Q	(Slovakia) J Čepelová	4	6^{1}
(Russia) N Bratchikova	5	3
(United States) J Craybas	7	6
PR	(Croatia) A Tomljanović	3	4
(Luxembourg) M Minella	6	6
(Poland) M Domachowska	4	5
4	(Spain) C Suárez Navarro	6	7
5	(Croatia) P Martić	1	6	6^{5}
(Austria) Y Meusburger	6	4	7^{7}
WC	(Austria) B Haas	7	1	3
Q	(Bulgaria) D Evtimova	5	6	6
(Austria) P Mayr-Achleitner	6	6
WC	(Austria) N Rottmann	2	3
(Colombia) M Duque-Mariño	3	4
2/WC	(Belgium) Y Wickmayer	6	6

Second round
8	(Sweden) J Larsson	6	6
(United States) J Craybas	2	3
(Luxembourg) M Minella	6	3	6
4	(Spain) C Suárez Navarro	2	6	3
(Austria) Y Meusburger	6	6
Q	(Bulgaria) D Evtimova	2	3
(Austria) P Mayr-Achleitner	6^{4}	3
2/WC	(Belgium) Y Wickmayer	7^{7}	6

Quarterfinals
8	(Sweden) J Larsson	6	2	2
(Luxembourg) M Minella	1	6	6
(Austria) Y Meusburger	3	2
2/WC	(Belgium) Y Wickmayer	6	6

Semifinals
(Luxembourg) M Minella	6^{3}	3
2/WC	(Belgium) Y Wickmayer	7^{7}	6

== Qualifying ==
=== Seeds ===
1. (Bulgaria) Dia Evtimova (qualified)
2. (Slovakia) Jana Čepelová (qualified)
3. (United States) Chichi Scholl (qualified)
4. (Germany) Kathrin Wörle (moved to Main draw)
5. (Spain) Inés Ferrer Suárez (qualifying competition)
6. (Italy) Maria Elena Camerin (first round)
7. (Spain) Leticia Costas-Moreira (qualifying competition)
8. (Netherlands) Richèl Hogenkamp (qualified)

=== Qualifiers ===
1. (Bulgaria) Dia Evtimova
2. (Slovakia) Jana Čepelová
3. (United States) Chichi Scholl
4. (Netherlands) Richèl Hogenkamp

=== Draw ===
==== First qualifier ====
First round
1	(Bulgaria) Dia Evtimova	6	4	6
WC	(Austria) Janina Toljan	4	6	3
(Croatia) Ani Mijačika	6	6
6	(Italy) Maria Elena Camerin	3	3

Qualifying competition
1	(Bulgaria) Dia Evtimova	3	6	6
(Croatia) Ani Mijačika	6	3	3

==== Second qualifier ====
First round
2	(Slovakia) Jana Čepelová	6	7^{12}
(Russia) Marina Melnikova	3	6^{10}
Alt	(Slovenia) Andreja Klepač	2	7	3
7	(Spain) Leticia Costas-Moreira	6	5	6

Qualifying competition
2	(Slovakia) Jana Čepelová	6	6
7	(Spain) Leticia Costas-Moreira	1	2

==== Third qualifier ====
First round
3	(United States) Chiara Scholl	7^{7}	6
WC	(Austria) Yvonne Neuwirth	6^{4}	4
(Bosnia and Herzegovina) Mervana Jugić-Salkić	3	3
(Latvia) Anastasija Sevastova	6	6

Qualifying competition
3	(United States) Chiara Scholl	4	7^{7}	0
(Latvia) Anastasija Sevastova	6	6^{4}	0^{r}

==== Fourth qualifier ====
First round
5	(Spain) Inés Ferrer Suárez	6	4	7^{7}
(Czech Republic) Sandra Záhlavová	3	6	6^{0}
(Croatia) Maria Abramović	3	3
8	(Netherlands) Richèl Hogenkamp	6	6

Qualifying competition
5	(Spain) Inés Ferrer Suárez	7^{8}	3	6^{5}
8	(Netherlands) Richèl Hogenkamp	6^{6}	6	7^{7}
