= 2017 China Open – Men's doubles =

Men's doubles
- 2017 China Open

Final
- Champions: (Finland) Henri Kontinen; (Australia) John Peers
- Runners-up: (United States) John Isner; (United States) Jack Sock
- Score: 6–3, 3–6, [10–7]

Events
Singles	men	women
Doubles	men	women
← 2016 ·	China Open	· 2018 →

Pablo Carreño Busta and Rafael Nadal were the defending champions, but chose not to participate this year.

Henri Kontinen and John Peers won the title, defeating John Isner and Jack Sock in the final, 6–3, 3–6, [10–7].

== Seeds ==
1. (Finland) Henri Kontinen / (Australia) John Peers (champions)
2. (Poland) Łukasz Kubot / (Brazil) Marcelo Melo (first round)
3. (Croatia) Ivan Dodig / (Spain) Marcel Granollers (first round)
4. (Austria) Oliver Marach / (Croatia) Mate Pavić (first round)

== Draw ==
Key

- Q = Qualifier
- WC = Wild card
- LL = Lucky loser
- Alt = Alternate
- ITF = ITF entry
- PR = Protected ranking
- SR = Special ranking
- SE = Special exempt
- JE = Junior exempt
- JR = Junior Accelerator Programme entrant
- CO = College Accelerator Programme entrant
- NG = Next Gen Accelerator Program entrant
- w/o = Walkover
- r = Retired
- d = Defaulted

=== Draw ===
First round

Quarterfinals

Semifinals

Final

1
(Finland) H Kontinen
(Australia) J Peers
6
7

- (Czech Republic) T Berdych
- (Serbia) N Zimonjić
3
5

1
(Finland) H Kontinen
(Australia) J Peers
7
7^{8}

WC
- (China) M Gong
- (China) Ze Zhang
0
4

- (India) R Bopanna
- (Uruguay) P Cuevas
5
6^{6}

(India) R Bopanna
(Uruguay) P Cuevas
6
6

1
(Finland) H Kontinen
(Australia) J Peers
7^{8}
3
[10]

3
- (Croatia) I Dodig
- (Spain) M Granollers
5
6
[7]

- (Italy) P Lorenzi
- (Germany) M Zverev
6^{6}
6
[7]

(Italy) P Lorenzi
(Germany) M Zverev
7
1
[10]

(Italy) P Lorenzi
(Germany) M Zverev
6
7^{7}

Q
- (Netherlands) W Koolhof
- (New Zealand) A Sitak
4
6
[7]

WC
- (Argentina) JM del Potro
- (Argentina) L Mayer
4
6^{5}

WC
(Argentina) JM del Potro
(Argentina) L Mayer
6
3
[10]

1
(Finland) H Kontinen
(Australia) J Peers
6
3
[10]

(France) L Pouille
(Spain) F Verdasco
6
6

- (United States) J Isner
- (United States) J Sock
3
6
[7]

- (Spain) R Bautista Agut
- (United Kingdom) A Bedene
4
4

- (France) L Pouille
- (Spain) F Verdasco
6^{3}
4

(United States) J Isner
(United States) J Sock
7^{7}
7^{8}

(United States) J Isner
(United States) J Sock
7^{7}
6

4
- (Austria) O Marach
- (Croatia) M Pavić
6^{3}
6^{6}

(United States) J Isner
(United States) J Sock
6^{5}
6
[10]

(Italy) F Fognini
(Netherlands) R Haase
3
6
[10]

- (Colombia) JS Cabal
- (Colombia) R Farah
7^{7}
2
[6]

- (France) F Martin
- (Netherlands) M Middelkoop
6
3
[6]

- (Italy) F Fognini
- (Netherlands) R Haase
1
5

(Colombia) JS Cabal
(Colombia) R Farah
3
7^{11}
[12]

(Colombia) JS Cabal
(Colombia) R Farah
6
7

2
- (Poland) Ł Kubot
- (Brazil) M Melo
6
6^{9}
[10]

== Qualifying ==
=== Seeds ===
1. (Netherlands) Wesley Koolhof / (New Zealand) Artem Sitak (qualified)
2. (Czech Republic) Roman Jebavý / (Spain) David Marrero (qualifying competition)

=== Qualifiers ===
1. (Netherlands) Wesley Koolhof / (New Zealand) Artem Sitak

=== Qualifying draw ===
Qualifying competition

1
(Netherlands) Wesley Koolhof
(New Zealand) Artem Sitak
7^{7}
6

2
- (Czech Republic) Roman Jebavý
- (Spain) David Marrero
6^{5}
1
