= 2017 China Open – Men's singles =

Men's singles
- 2017 China Open

Final
- Champion: (Spain) Rafael Nadal
- Runner-up: (Australia) Nick Kyrgios
- Score: 6–2, 6–1

Details
- Draw: 32 (4Q / 3WC)
- Seeds: 8

Events
| Singles | men | women |
| Doubles | men | women |
- China Open

Rafael Nadal defeated Nick Kyrgios in the final, 6–2, 6–1 to win the men's singles tennis title at the 2017 China Open. Nadal saved two match points en route to the title, in his first-round match against Lucas Pouille.

Andy Murray was the reigning champion, but withdrew with a hip injury before the tournament.

== Seeds ==
1. (Spain) Rafael Nadal (champion)
2. (Germany) Alexander Zverev (semifinals)
3. (Bulgaria) Grigor Dimitrov (semifinals)
4. (Spain) Pablo Carreño Busta (first round)
5. (Spain) Roberto Bautista Agut (quarterfinals)
6. (United States) John Isner (quarterfinals)
7. (Czech Republic) Tomáš Berdych (second round)
8. (Australia) Nick Kyrgios (final)

== Draw ==
Key

- Q = Qualifier
- WC = Wild card
- LL = Lucky loser
- Alt = Alternate
- ITF = ITF entry
- PR = Protected ranking
- SR = Special ranking
- SE = Special exempt
- JE = Junior exempt
- JR = Junior Accelerator Programme entrant
- CO = College Accelerator Programme entrant
- NG = Next Gen Accelerator Program entrant
- w/o = Walkover
- r = Retired
- d = Defaulted

=== Finals ===
Semifinals
1 | (Spain) Rafael Nadal | 6 | 4 | 6
3 | (Bulgaria) Grigor Dimitrov | 3 | 6 | 1
8 | (Australia) Nick Kyrgios | 6 | 7
2 | (Germany) Alexander Zverev | 3 | 5

Final
1 | (Spain) Rafael Nadal | 6 | 6
8 | (Australia) Nick Kyrgios | 2 | 1

=== Top half ===
First round
1 | (Spain) R Nadal | 4 | 7^{8} | 7
(France) L Pouille | 6 | 6^{6} | 5
WC | (China) D Wu | 4 | 2
(Russia) K Khachanov | 6 | 6
(Argentina) L Mayer | 7^{8} | 5 | 6
(Italy) P Lorenzi | 6^{6} | 7 | 4
Q | (Tunisia) M Jaziri | 2 | 3
6 | (United States) J Isner | 6 | 6
3 | (Bulgaria) G Dimitrov | 6 | 3 | 6
SE | (Bosnia and Herzegovina) D Džumhur | 1 | 6 | 3
(Uruguay) P Cuevas | 6^{4} | 4
WC | (Argentina) JM del Potro | 7^{7} | 6
Q | (Spain) M Granollers | 4 | 2
(United Kingdom) A Bedene | 6 | 6
WC | (China) Ze Zhang | 1 | 3
5 | (Spain) R Bautista Agut | 6 | 6

Second round
1 | (Spain) R Nadal | 6 | 6
(Russia) K Khachanov | 3 | 3
(Argentina) L Mayer | 0 | 3
6 | (United States) J Isner | 6 | 6
3 | (Bulgaria) G Dimitrov | 7^{8} | 7
WC | (Argentina) JM del Potro | 6^{6} | 5
(United Kingdom) A Bedene | 0 | 0^{r}
5 | (Spain) R Bautista Agut | 6 | 4

Quarterfinals
1 | (Spain) R Nadal | 6 | 7^{7}
6 | (United States) J Isner | 4 | 6^{0}
3 | (Bulgaria) G Dimitrov | 7^{7} | 4 | 6
5 | (Spain) R Bautista Agut | 6^{5} | 6 | 2

Semifinals
1 | (Spain) R Nadal | 6 | 4 | 6
3 | (Bulgaria) G Dimitrov | 3 | 6 | 1

=== Bottom half ===
First round
8 | (Australia) N Kyrgios | 6 | 6
(Georgia (country)) N Basilashvili | 1 | 2
(Germany) J-L Struff | 7 | 4 | 4
(Germany) M Zverev | 5 | 6 | 6
(Spain) F Verdasco | 1 | 6 | 3
Q | (Serbia) D Lajović | 6 | 3 | 6
Q | (Belgium) S Darcis | 6 | 6
4 | (Spain) P Carreño Busta | 0 | 4
7 | (Czech Republic) T Berdych | 6 | 0 | 6
(United States) J Donaldson | 3 | 6 | 2
(United States) J Sock | 6 | 1 | 2
(Russia) A Rublev | 3 | 6 | 6
(Netherlands) R Haase | 6^{4} | 2
(Italy) F Fognini | 7^{7} | 6
(United Kingdom) K Edmund | 3 | 6^{3}
2 | (Germany) A Zverev | 6 | 7^{7}

Second round
8 | (Australia) N Kyrgios | 3 | 6 | 6
(Germany) M Zverev | 6 | 2 | 2
Q | (Serbia) D Lajović | 3 | 4
Q | (Belgium) S Darcis | 6 | 6
7 | (Czech Republic) T Berdych | 6 | 4 | 1
(Russia) A Rublev | 1 | 6 | 6
(Italy) F Fognini | 4 | 2
2 | (Germany) A Zverev | 6 | 6

Quarterfinals
8 | (Australia) N Kyrgios | 6 | 3
Q | (Belgium) S Darcis | 0 | 0^{r}
(Russia) A Rublev | 2 | 3
2 | (Germany) A Zverev | 6 | 6

Semifinals
8 | (Australia) N Kyrgios | 6 | 7
2 | (Germany) A Zverev | 3 | 5

== Qualifying ==
=== Seeds ===
1. (Croatia) Borna Ćorić (qualifying competition)
2. (Brazil) Rogério Dutra Silva (qualifying competition)
3. (Belgium) Steve Darcis (qualified)
4. (Tunisia) Malek Jaziri (qualified)
5. (Serbia) Dušan Lajović (qualified)
6. (France) Jérémy Chardy (first round)
7. (Ukraine) Sergiy Stakhovsky (qualifying competition)
8. (Canada) Peter Polansky (qualifying competition)

=== Qualifiers ===
1. (Spain) Marcel Granollers
2. (Serbia) Dušan Lajović
3. (Belgium) Steve Darcis
4. (Tunisia) Malek Jaziri

=== Qualifying draw ===
==== First qualifier ====
First round
1 | (Croatia) Borna Ćorić | 6 | 6
Alt | (United States) Marcos Giron | 3 | 4
Alt | (Spain) Marcel Granollers | 6 | 6
6 | (France) Jérémy Chardy | 3 | 2

Qualifying competition
1 | (Croatia) Borna Ćorić | 3 | 4
Alt | (Spain) Marcel Granollers | 6 | 6

==== Second qualifier ====
First round
2 | (Brazil) Rogério Dutra Silva | 6 | 6
WC | (China) Te Rigele | 0 | 4
(Italy) Alessandro Giannessi | 3 | 6 | 3
5 | (Serbia) Dušan Lajović | 6 | 3 | 6

Qualifying competition
2 | (Brazil) Rogério Dutra Silva | 3 | 7 | 3
5 | (Serbia) Dušan Lajović | 6 | 5 | 6

==== Third qualifier ====
First round
3 | (Belgium) Steve Darcis | 6 | 6
WC | (China) Sun Fajing | 4 | 2
Alt | (Croatia) Ivan Dodig | 6 | 5 | 0^{r}
8/Alt | (Canada) Peter Polansky | 4 | 7 | 0

Qualifying competition
3 | (Belgium) Steve Darcis | 5 | 7^{8} | 6
8/Alt | (Canada) Peter Polansky | 7 | 6^{6} | 4

==== Fourth qualifier ====
First round
4 | (Tunisia) Malek Jaziri | 6 | 6
WC | (China) Zhang Zhizhen | 4 | 1
(Brazil) Thiago Monteiro | 7^{7} | 5 | 3
7 | (Ukraine) Sergiy Stakhovsky | 6^{4} | 7 | 6

Qualifying competition
4 | (Tunisia) Malek Jaziri | 6 | 7^{9}
7 | (Ukraine) Sergiy Stakhovsky | 4 | 6^{7}
