= 2010 Gastein Ladies =

- Date: 19–25 July
- Edition: 4th
- Category: WTA International
- Draw: 32S / 16D
- Prize money: $220,000
- Surface: Clay / outdoor
- Location: Bad Gastein, Austria

Champions

Singles
- (Germany) Julia Görges

Doubles
- (Czech Republic) Lucie Hradecká / (Spain) Anabel Medina Garrigues
- Gastein Ladies

The 2010 Gastein Ladies (also known as NÜRNBERGER Gastein Ladies for sponsorship purposes) was a women's tennis tournament played on outdoor clay courts. It was the 4th edition of the Gastein Ladies, and was part of the WTA International tournaments of the 2010 WTA Tour. It was held in Bad Gastein, Austria, from 19 July until 25 July 2010. Unseeded Julia Görges won the singles title.

== Finals ==
=== Singles ===
(Germany) Julia Görges defeated (Switzerland) Timea Bacsinszky, 6–1, 6–4

- It was Görges' only singles title of the year and the first of her career.

=== Doubles ===
(Czech Republic) Lucie Hradecká / (Spain) Anabel Medina Garrigues defeated (Switzerland) Timea Bacsinszky / (Italy) Tathiana Garbin, 6–7^{(2–7)}, 6–1, [10–5]

== WTA entrants ==
=== Seeds ===
Player	Nationality	Ranking*	Seeding
Andrea Petkovic	Germany	36	1
Timea Bacsinszky	Switzerland	41	2
Anabel Medina Garrigues	Spain	44	3
Klára Zakopalová	Czech Republic	45	4
Sybille Bammer	Austria	48	5
Barbora Záhlavová-Strýcová	Czech Republic	52	6
Tathiana Garbin	Italy	63	7
Anastasija Sevastova	Latvia	64	8

- Seedings are based on the rankings of July 12, 2010.

=== Other entrants ===
The following players received wildcards into the singles main draw:

- (Austria) Nikola Hofmanova
- (Austria) Melanie Klaffner
- (Austria) Patricia Mayr

The following players received entry from the qualifying draw:

- (Belarus) Ekaterina Dzehalevich
- (Spain) Laura Pous Tió
- (Ukraine) Lesya Tsurenko
- (Slovakia) Lenka Tvarošková
