= 2010 Gastein Ladies – Singles =

Singles
- 2010 Gastein Ladies

Final
- Champion: (Germany) Julia Görges
- Runner-up: (Switzerland) Timea Bacsinszky
- Score: 6–1, 6–4

Details
- Draw: 32
- Seeds: 8

Events
Singles	Doubles
← 2009 ·	Gastein Ladies	· 2011 →

Andrea Petkovic was the defender of title; however, she lost to Alizé Cornet in the second round.
Julia Görges won in the final 6–1, 6–4, against Timea Bacsinszky.

== Seeds ==
1. (Germany) Andrea Petkovic (second round)
2. (Switzerland) Timea Bacsinszky (final)
3. (Spain) Anabel Medina Garrigues (first round)
4. (Czech Republic) Klára Zakopalová (first round)
5. (Austria) Sybille Bammer (first round)
6. (Czech Republic) Barbora Záhlavová-Strýcová (first round)
7. (Italy) Tathiana Garbin (second round)
8. (Latvia) Anastasija Sevastova (quarterfinals)

== Draw ==
=== Key ===
- Q = Qualifier
- WC = Wild card
- LL = Lucky loser
- Alt = Alternate
- SE = Special exempt
- PR = Protected ranking
- ITF = ITF entry
- JE = Junior exempt
- w/o = Walkover
- r = Retired
- d = Defaulted
- SR = Special ranking

=== Finals ===
Semifinals
(France) Alizé Cornet	1	4
(Germany) Julia Görges	6	6
(Austria) Yvonne Meusburger	6	4	3
2	(Switzerland) Timea Bacsinszky	1	6	6

Final
(Germany) Julia Görges	6	6
2	(Switzerland) Timea Bacsinszky	1	4

=== Top half ===
First round
1	(Germany) A Petkovic	6	6
(Czech Republic) I Benešová	4	0
(France) A Cornet	6	6
(Netherlands) A Rus	2	0
WC	(Austria) P Mayr	6	6
Q	(Slovakia) L Tvarošková	2	0
(France) P Parmentier	6	3	1
7	(Italy) T Garbin	3	6	6
4	(Czech Republic) K Zakopalová	2	7	1
(Germany) J Görges	6	5	6
(Ukraine) M Koryttseva	6^{2}	7	6
(Germany) T Malek	7	6^{3}	2
(Romania) IR Olaru	1	6	6
(Germany) K Wörle	6	4	3
(Russia) A Pivovarova	7	6
5	(Austria) S Bammer	6^{10}	3

Second round
1	(Germany) A Petkovic	2	5
(France) A Cornet	6	7
WC	(Austria) P Mayr	6	6
7	(Italy) T Garbin	3	4
(Germany) J Görges	6	7
(Ukraine) M Koryttseva	2	5
(Romania) IR Olaru	1	6	4
(Russia) A Pivovarova	6	2	6

Quarterfinals
(France) A Cornet	6	6^{5}	6
WC	(Austria) P Mayr	2	7	1
(Germany) J Görges	6	6^{4}	6
(Russia) A Pivovarova	4	7	4

Semifinals
(France) A Cornet	1	4
(Germany) J Görges	6	6

=== Bottom half ===
First round
8	(Latvia) A Sevastova	6	6
Q	(Spain) L Pous Tió	2	4
(Romania) S Halep	7	6
(Czech Republic) R Voráčová	5	2
(Czech Republic) L Hradecká	6	6
WC	(Austria) N Hofmanova	2	2
(Austria) Y Meusburger	6	7
3	(Spain) A Medina Garrigues	4	5
6	(Czech Republic) B Záhlavová-Strýcová	5	3
(Czech Republic) S Záhlavová	7	6
(Colombia) M Duque Mariño	3	6^{3}
Q	(Ukraine) L Tsurenko	6	7
WC	(Austria) M Klaffner	6	4	1
Q	(Belarus) E Dzehalevich	0	6	6
(Germany) A-L Grönefeld	1	2
2	(Switzerland) T Bacsinszky	6	6

Second round
8	(Latvia) A Sevastova	5	6	5
(Romania) S Halep	7	1	0^{r}
(Czech Republic) L Hradecká	5	5
(Austria) Y Meusburger	7	7
(Czech Republic) S Záhlavová	6	6
Q	(Ukraine) L Tsurenko	2	4
Q	(Belarus) E Dzehalevich	6	3	3
2	(Switzerland) T Bacsinszky	4	6	6

Quarterfinals
8	(Latvia) A Sevastova	5	4
(Austria) Y Meusburger	7	6
(Czech Republic) S Záhlavová	0	4
2	(Switzerland) T Bacsinszky	6	6

Semifinals
(Austria) Y Meusburger	6	4	3
2	(Switzerland) T Bacsinszky	1	6	6
