= 2011 Gastein Ladies – Doubles =

Doubles
- 2011 Gastein Ladies

Final
- Champions: (Czech Republic) Eva Birnerová (Czech Republic) Lucie Hradecká
- Runners-up: (Australia) Jarmila Gajdošová (Germany) Julia Görges
- Score: 4–6, 6–2, [12–10]

Details
- Draw: 16
- Seeds: 4

Events
Singles	Doubles
- Gastein Ladies

Lucie Hradecká and Anabel Medina Garrigues were the defending champions, but Garrigues chose to participate in the 2011 Internazionali Femminili di Palermo.

Hradecká has partnered up with Eva Birnerová and won the tournament, beating Jarmila Gajdošová and Julia Görges in the final, 4–6, 6–2, [12–10]. This was the fifth straight time that Hradecká won the event in doubles, having won every time since the event's creation in 2007.

== Seeds ==
1. (South Africa) Natalie Grandin / (Czech Republic) Vladimíra Uhlířová (first round)
2. (Belarus) Olga Govortsova / (Russia) Alla Kudryavtseva (quarterfinals,
  withdrew due to Kudryavtseva's toothache)
3. (Spain) Nuria Llagostera Vives / (Spain) Arantxa Parra Santonja (quarterfinals,
  withdrew due to Llagostera Vives's right shoulder injury)
4. (Poland) Klaudia Jans / (Poland) Alicja Rosolska (quarterfinals)

== Draw ==
Key

- Q = Qualifier
- WC = Wild card
- LL = Lucky loser
- Alt = Alternate
- ITF = ITF entry
- PR = Protected ranking
- SR = Special ranking
- SE = Special exempt
- JE = Junior exempt
- JR = Junior Accelerator Programme entrant
- CO = College Accelerator Programme entrant
- NG = Next Gen Accelerator Program entrant
- w/o = Walkover
- r = Retired
- d = Defaulted

=== Draw ===
First round
1	(South Africa) N Grandin (Czech Republic) V Uhlířová	6	5	[5]
(Australia) J Gajdošová (Germany) J Görges	4	7	[10]
(Spain) L Domínguez Lino (Spain) L Pous Tió	6	6
(Ukraine) A Bondarenko (Ukraine) K Bondarenko	4	3
3	(Spain) N Llagostera Vives (Spain) A Parra Santonja	7	6
(Germany) K Barrois (Germany) J Wöhr	5	3
(Croatia) P Martić (Australia) J Moore	0	6	[6]
WC	(Austria) N Hofmanova (Austria) M Klaffner	6	3	[10]
(Czech Republic) E Birnerová (Czech Republic) L Hradecká	6	7^{7}
(Australia) D Dominikovic (Germany) L Siegemund	4	6^{1}
(United Kingdom) S Borwell (Hungary) K Marosi	1	6	[8]
4	(Poland) K Jans (Poland) A Rosolska	6	4	[10]
(Russia) K Pervak (Ukraine) L Tsurenko	6	6
(Ukraine) L Kichenok (Ukraine) N Kichenok	1	4
(Poland) M Domachowska (Austria) S Klemenschits	4	6	[10]
2	(Belarus) O Govortsova (Russia) A Kudryavtseva	6	2	[12]

Quarterfinals
(Australia) J Gajdošová (Germany) J Görges	6	6
(Spain) L Domínguez Lino (Spain) L Pous Tió	3	3
3	(Spain) N Llagostera Vives (Spain) A Parra Santonja
WC	(Austria) N Hofmanova (Austria) M Klaffner	w/o
(Czech Republic) E Birnerová (Czech Republic) L Hradecká	5	7	[10]
4	(Poland) K Jans (Poland) A Rosolska	7	5	[8]
(Russia) K Pervak (Ukraine) L Tsurenko	w/o
2	(Belarus) O Govortsova (Russia) A Kudryavtseva

Semifinals
(Australia) J Gajdošová (Germany) J Görges	6	6
WC	(Austria) N Hofmanova (Austria) M Klaffner	3	3
(Czech Republic) E Birnerová (Czech Republic) L Hradecká	6	6
(Russia) K Pervak (Ukraine) L Tsurenko	3	3

Final
(Australia) J Gajdošová (Germany) J Görges	6	2	[10]
(Czech Republic) E Birnerová (Czech Republic) L Hradecká	4	6	[12]
