= 2012 Gastein Ladies – Doubles =

Doubles
- 2012 Gastein Ladies

Final
- Champions: (United States) Jill Craybas (Germany) Julia Görges
- Runners-up: (Germany) Anna-Lena Grönefeld (Croatia) Petra Martić
- Score: 6–7^{(4–7)}, 6–4, [11–9]

Details
- Draw: 16
- Seeds: 4

Events
Singles	Doubles
- Gastein Ladies

Eva Birnerová and Lucie Hradecká were the defending champions but Hradecká decided not to participate.

Birnerová teamed up with Alizé Cornet, but had to withdraw due to the Czech's right thigh injury.

Jill Craybas and Julia Görges won the title, defeating Anna-Lena Grönefeld and Petra Martić in the final with the score 6–7^{(4–7)}, 6–4, [11–9].

== Seeds ==
1. (Germany) Anna-Lena Grönefeld / (Croatia) Petra Martić (final)
2. (Romania) Irina-Camelia Begu / (Luxembourg) Mandy Minella (quarterfinals)
3. (Czech Republic) Eva Birnerová / (France) Alizé Cornet (withdrew because of a right thigh injury for Birnerová)
4. (United States) Jill Craybas / (Germany) Julia Görges (champions)
5. (Croatia) Darija Jurak / (Hungary) Katalin Marosi (semifinals)

== Draw ==
Key

- Q = Qualifier
- WC = Wild card
- LL = Lucky loser
- Alt = Alternate
- ITF = ITF entry
- PR = Protected ranking
- SR = Special ranking
- SE = Special exempt
- JE = Junior exempt
- JR = Junior Accelerator Programme entrant
- CO = College Accelerator Programme entrant
- NG = Next Gen Accelerator Program entrant
- w/o = Walkover
- r = Retired
- d = Defaulted

=== Draw ===
First round
1	(Germany) A-L Grönefeld (Croatia) P Martić	3	6	[10]
(Spain) E Cabeza Candela (Colombia) M Duque	6	4	[3]
(United States) L Lee-Waters (United States) M Moulton-Levy	6	3	[10]
(Ukraine) Y Beygelzimer (Germany) K Wörle	4	6	[6]
5	(Croatia) D Jurak (Hungary) K Marosi	6	6
(Spain) L Arruabarrena Vecino (Spain) L Pous Tió	2	1
Alt	(Czech Republic) H Birnerová (Netherlands) R Hogenkamp	6	6
WC	(Austria) B Haas (Austria) J Toljan	4	1
(Romania) E Gallovits-Hall (Kazakhstan) K Pervak	6^{1}	3
(Spain) L Costas-Moreira (Spain) I Ferrer Suárez	7^{7}	6
WC	(Austria) Y Neuwirth (Austria) N Rottmann	2	2
4	(United States) J Craybas (Germany) J Görges	6	6
(Croatia) M Abramović (Croatia) A Tomljanović	6^{5}	1
(Bosnia and Herzegovina) M Jugić-Salkić (Austria) S Klemenschits	7^{7}	6
(Italy) ME Camerin (Slovenia) A Klepač	3	0
2	(Romania) I-C Begu (Luxembourg) M Minella	6	6

Quarterfinals
1	(Germany) A-L Grönefeld (Croatia) P Martić	6	6
(United States) L Lee-Waters (United States) M Moulton-Levy	3	3
5	(Croatia) D Jurak (Hungary) K Marosi	6	6
Alt	(Czech Republic) H Birnerová (Netherlands) R Hogenkamp	3	4
(Spain) L Costas-Moreira (Spain) I Ferrer Suárez	1	5
4	(United States) J Craybas (Germany) J Görges	6	7
(Bosnia and Herzegovina) M Jugić-Salkić (Austria) S Klemenschits	6	4	[11]
2	(Romania) I-C Begu (Luxembourg) M Minella	2	6	[9]

Semifinals
1	(Germany) A-L Grönefeld (Croatia) P Martić	6	6^{2}	[10]
5	(Croatia) D Jurak (Hungary) K Marosi	3	7^{7}	[4]
4	(United States) J Craybas (Germany) J Görges	6	6
(Bosnia and Herzegovina) M Jugić-Salkić (Austria) S Klemenschits	0	4

Final
1	(Germany) A-L Grönefeld (Croatia) P Martić	7	4	[9]
4	(United States) J Craybas (Germany) J Görges	6^{4}	6	[11]
