= 2010 Gastein Ladies – Doubles =

Doubles
- 2010 Gastein Ladies

Final
- Champions: (Czech Republic) Lucie Hradecká (Spain) Anabel Medina Garrigues
- Runners-up: (Switzerland) Timea Bacsinszky (Italy) Tathiana Garbin
- Score: 6–7^{(2–7)}, 6–1, [10–5]

Details
- Draw: 16
- Seeds: 4

Events
Singles	Doubles
- Gastein Ladies

Andrea Hlaváčková and Lucie Hradecká were the defending champions, but Hlaváčková chose not to participate.
Hradecká chose to compete with Anabel Medina Garrigues and they became the new winners, after their won 6–7^{(2–7)}, 6–1, [10–5], against Timea Bacsinszky and Tathiana Garbin. This was the fourth straight time that Hradecká won the event in doubles, having won every time since the event's creation in 2007.

== Seeds ==
1. (Czech Republic) Iveta Benešová / (Czech Republic) Barbora Záhlavová-Strýcová (semifinals)
2. (Czech Republic) Lucie Hradecká / (Spain) Anabel Medina Garrigues (champions)
3. (Germany) Julia Görges / (Germany) Anna-Lena Grönefeld (semifinals, withdrew due to Görges' low back injury)
4. (Switzerland) Timea Bacsinszky / (Italy) Tathiana Garbin (final)

== Draw ==
Key

- Q = Qualifier
- WC = Wild card
- LL = Lucky loser
- Alt = Alternate
- ITF = ITF entry
- PR = Protected ranking
- SR = Special ranking
- SE = Special exempt
- JE = Junior exempt
- JR = Junior Accelerator Programme entrant
- CO = College Accelerator Programme entrant
- NG = Next Gen Accelerator Program entrant
- w/o = Walkover
- r = Retired
- d = Defaulted

=== Draw ===
First round
1	(Czech Republic) I Benešová (Czech Republic) B Záhlavová-Strýcová	2
(Ukraine) M Koryttseva (Tunisia) S Sfar	1	r
(Czech Republic) R Voráčová (Czech Republic) K Zakopalová	5	6^{6}
(Austria) S Klemenschits (Latvia) A Sevastova	7	7
4	(Switzerland) T Bacsinszky (Italy) T Garbin	6	6
WC	(Austria) C Kandler (Austria) J Toljan	1	2
(France) A Cornet (Austria) Y Meusburger	3	4
(Belarus) E Dzehalevich (Belarus) T Poutchek	6	6
WC	(Austria) N Hofmanova (Czech Republic) E Hrdinová	1	7	[10]
(Russia) A Pivovarova (Ukraine) L Tsurenko	6	5	[2]
(Germany) T Malek (Germany) A Petkovic	4	3
3	(Germany) J Görges (Germany) A-L Grönefeld	6	6
(Argentina) J Cravero (Germany) K Wörle	6^{9}	2
(Argentina) M Irigoyen (Austria) M Klaffner	7	6
(Bosnia and Herzegovina) M Jugić-Salkić (Croatia) D Jurak	2	2
2	(Czech Republic) L Hradecká (Spain) A Medina Garrigues	6	6

Quarterfinals
1	(Czech Republic) I Benešová (Czech Republic) B Záhlavová-Strýcová	6	6
(Austria) S Klemenschits (Latvia) A Sevastova	4	1
4	(Switzerland) T Bacsinszky (Italy) T Garbin	7	6
(Belarus) E Dzehalevich (Belarus) T Poutchek	5	1
WC	(Austria) N Hofmanova (Czech Republic) E Hrdinová	2	6	[5]
3	(Germany) J Görges (Germany) A-L Grönefeld	6	2	[10]
(Argentina) M Irigoyen (Austria) M Klaffner	3	0
2	(Czech Republic) L Hradecká (Spain) A Medina Garrigues	6	6

Semifinals
1	(Czech Republic) I Benešová (Czech Republic) B Záhlavová-Strýcová	5	6	[8]
4	(Switzerland) T Bacsinszky (Italy) T Garbin	7	2	[10]
3	(Germany) J Görges (Germany) A-L Grönefeld	w/o
2	(Czech Republic) L Hradecká (Spain) A Medina Garrigues

Finals
4	(Switzerland) T Bacsinszky (Italy) T Garbin	7	2	[5]
2	(Czech Republic) L Hradecká (Spain) A Medina Garrigues	6^{2}	6	[10]
