= 2017 China Open – Women's doubles =

Women's doubles
- 2017 China Open

Final
- Champions: (Chinese Taipei) Chan Yung-jan (Switzerland) Martina Hingis
- Runners-up: (Hungary) Tímea Babos (Czech Republic) Andrea Hlaváčková
- Score: 6–1, 6–4

Events
Singles	men	women
Doubles	men	women
← 2016 ·	China Open	· 2018 →

Bethanie Mattek-Sands and Lucie Šafářová were the defending champions, but neither player could participate this year due to injury.

Chan Yung-jan and Martina Hingis won the title, defeating Tímea Babos and Andrea Hlaváčková in the final, 6–1, 6–4.

== Seeds ==
The top four seeds received a bye into the second round.

1. (Chinese Taipei) Chan Yung-jan / (Switzerland) Martina Hingis (champions)
2. (Russia) Ekaterina Makarova / (Russia) Elena Vesnina (semifinals)
3. (India) Sania Mirza / (China) Peng Shuai (semifinals)
4. (Hungary) Tímea Babos / (Czech Republic) Andrea Hlaváčková (final)
5. (Czech Republic) Kateřina Siniaková / (Czech Republic) Barbora Strýcová (quarterfinals)
6. (Australia) Ashleigh Barty / (Australia) Casey Dellacqua (second round)
7. (Canada) Gabriela Dabrowski / (China) Xu Yifan (quarterfinals)
8. (Germany) Anna-Lena Grönefeld / (Czech Republic) Květa Peschke (second round)

== Draw ==
=== Key ===
- Q = Qualifier
- WC = Wild card
- LL = Lucky loser
- Alt = Alternate
- SE = Special exempt
- PR = Protected ranking
- ITF = ITF entry
- JE = Junior exempt
- w/o = Walkover
- r = Retired
- d = Defaulted
- SR = Special ranking

=== Finals ===
Semifinals
1	(Chinese Taipei) Chan Yung-jan (Switzerland) Martina Hingis	2	6	[10]
3	(India) Sania Mirza (China) Peng Shuai	6	1	[5]
4	(Hungary) Tímea Babos (Czech Republic) Andrea Hlaváčková	7	6^{4}	[10]
2	(Russia) Ekaterina Makarova (Russia) Elena Vesnina	5	7^{7}	[8]

Final
1	(Chinese Taipei) Chan Yung-jan (Switzerland) Martina Hingis	6	6
4	(Hungary) Tímea Babos (Czech Republic) Andrea Hlaváčková	1	4

=== Top half ===
First round
(Romania) S Cîrstea (Latvia) J Ostapenko	4	3
(Chinese Taipei) S-w Hsieh (Romania) M Niculescu	6	6
Alt	(United States) L Davis (United States) A Riske	7	2	[6]
(Ukraine) L Kichenok (Romania) R Olaru	5	6	[10]
(Ukraine) N Kichenok (Australia) An Rodionova	6	2	[8]
7	(Canada) G Dabrowski (China) Y Xu	1	6	[10]
(United States) A Spears (United States) C Vandeweghe	7^{7}	6^{3}	[10]
(Belgium) E Mertens (Netherlands) D Schuurs	6^{5}	7^{7}	[12]
(Japan) M Ninomiya (Czech Republic) R Voráčová	6	6^{7}	[9]
(Chinese Taipei) H-c Chan (France) A Cornet	1	7^{9}	[11]
(Russia) A Kudryavtseva (Poland) A Rosolska	2	2
5	(Czech Republic) K Siniaková (Czech Republic) B Strýcová	6	6

Second round
1	(Chinese Taipei) Y-j Chan (Switzerland) M Hingis	3	6	[12]
(Chinese Taipei) S-w Hsieh (Romania) M Niculescu	6	4	[10]
(Ukraine) L Kichenok (Romania) R Olaru	5	5
7	(Canada) G Dabrowski (China) Y Xu	7	7
3	(India) S Mirza (China) S Peng	7	6
(Belgium) E Mertens (Netherlands) D Schuurs	5	2
(Chinese Taipei) H-c Chan (France) A Cornet	6	4	[7]
5	(Czech Republic) K Siniaková (Czech Republic) B Strýcová	4	6	[10]

Quarterfinals
1	(Chinese Taipei) Y-j Chan (Switzerland) M Hingis	6	6
7	(Canada) G Dabrowski (China) Y Xu	3	2
3	(India) S Mirza (China) S Peng	4	6	[10]
5	(Czech Republic) K Siniaková (Czech Republic) B Strýcová	6	2	[7]

Semifinals
1	(Chinese Taipei) Y-j Chan (Switzerland) M Hingis	2	6	[10]
3	(India) S Mirza (China) S Peng	6	1	[5]

=== Bottom half ===
First round
8	(Germany) A-L Grönefeld (Czech Republic) K Peschke	3	6	[12]
(United States) N Melichar (United Kingdom) A Smith	6	2	[10]
WC	(China) Q Wang (China) Y Wang	5	3
(Netherlands) K Bertens (Germany) J Görges	7	6
(Latvia) A Sevastova (Croatia) D Vekić	6	4	[7]
(United States) S Stephens (United Kingdom) H Watson	4	6	[10]
6	(Australia) A Barty (Australia) C Dellacqua	6	6
(Ukraine) O Savchuk (Slovenia) K Srebotnik	1	2
(Japan) S Aoyama (China) Z Yang	4	3
(Slovenia) A Klepač (Spain) MJ Martínez Sánchez	6	6
WC	(China) X Han (China) C Liang	7^{15}	6
(United States) R Atawo (Croatia) D Jurak	6^{13}	3

Second round
8	(Germany) A-L Grönefeld (Czech Republic) K Peschke	6	6^{5}	[5]
(Netherlands) K Bertens (Germany) J Görges	2	7^{7}	[10]
(United States) S Stephens (United Kingdom) H Watson	3	4
4	(Hungary) T Babos (Czech Republic) A Hlaváčková	6	6
6	(Australia) A Barty (Australia) C Dellacqua	5	4
(Slovenia) A Klepač (Spain) MJ Martínez Sánchez	7	6
WC	(China) X Han (China) C Liang	1	2
2	(Russia) E Makarova (Russia) E Vesnina	6	6

Quarterfinals
(Netherlands) K Bertens (Germany) J Görges	6	3	[9]
4	(Hungary) T Babos (Czech Republic) A Hlaváčková	3	6	[11]
(Slovenia) A Klepač (Spain) MJ Martínez Sánchez	6	0	[7]
2	(Russia) E Makarova (Russia) E Vesnina	4	6	[10]

Semifinals
4	(Hungary) T Babos (Czech Republic) A Hlaváčková	7	6^{4}	[10]
2	(Russia) E Makarova (Russia) E Vesnina	5	7^{7}	[8]
