= 2012 Gastein Ladies =

- Date: 9–17 June
- Edition: 6th
- Category: WTA International
- Draw: 32S / 16D
- Surface: Clay / outdoor
- Location: Bad Gastein, Austria

Champions

Singles
- (France) Alizé Cornet

Doubles
- (United States) Jill Craybas / (Germany) Julia Görges
- Gastein Ladies

The 2012 Gastein Ladies was a professional women's tennis tournament played on outdoor clay courts. It was the sixth edition of the tournament which was part of the 2012 WTA Tour. It took place in Bad Gastein, Austria between 9 and 17 June 2012. Seventh-seeded Alizé Cornet won the singles title.

== Finals ==
=== Singles ===
- (France) Alizé Cornet defeated (Belgium) Yanina Wickmayer, 7–5, 7–6^{(7–1)}

=== Doubles ===
(United States) Jill Craybas / (Germany) Julia Görges defeated (Germany) Anna-Lena Grönefeld / (Croatia) Petra Martić, 6–7^{(4–7)}, 6–4, [11–9]

== Singles main draw entrants ==
=== Seeds ===
Country	Player	Rank^{1}	Seed
GER	Julia Görges	27	1
BEL	Yanina Wickmayer	35	2
KAZ	Ksenia Pervak	40	3
ESP	Carla Suárez Navarro	46	4
CRO	Petra Martić	50	5
ROU	Irina-Camelia Begu	59	6
FRA	Alizé Cornet	66	7
SWE	Johanna Larsson	80	8

- ^{1} Rankings are as of 28 May 2012

=== Other entrants ===
The following players received wildcards into the singles main draw:

- (Austria) Barbara Haas
- (Austria) Nicole Rottmann
- (Belgium) Yanina Wickmayer

The following players received entry from the qualifying draw:

- (Slovakia) Jana Čepelová
- (Bulgaria) Dia Evtimova
- (Netherlands) Richèl Hogenkamp
- (United States) Chichi Scholl

=== Withdrawals ===
- (Italy) Sara Errani (fatigue)
- (Slovenia) Polona Hercog
- (Spain) Silvia Soler-Espinosa
- (Canada) Aleksandra Wozniak

== Doubles main draw entrants ==
=== Seeds ===
Country	Player	Country	Player	Rank^{1}	Seed
GER	Anna-Lena Grönefeld	CRO	Petra Martić	105	1
ROU	Irina-Camelia Begu	LUX	Mandy Minella	120	2
~~CZE~~	~~Eva Birnerová~~	~~FRA~~	~~Alizé Cornet~~	~~134~~	~~3~~
USA	Jill Craybas	GER	Julia Görges	162	4
CRO	Darija Jurak	HUN	Katalin Marosi	181	5

- ^{1} Rankings are as of 28 May 2012

=== Other entrants ===
The following pairs received wildcards into the doubles main draw:

- (Austria) Barbara Haas / (Austria) Janina Toljan
- (Austria) Yvonne Neuwirth / (Austria) Nicole Rottmann

The following pair received entry as alternates:

- (Czech Republic) Hana Birnerová / (Netherlands) Richèl Hogenkamp

=== Withdrawals ===
- (Czech Republic) Eva Birnerová (right thigh injury)
