= 2011 Gastein Ladies – Singles =

Singles
- 2011 Gastein Ladies

Final
- Champion: (Spain) María José Martínez Sánchez
- Runner-up: (Austria) Patricia Mayr-Achleitner
- Score: 6–0, 7–5

Details
- Draw: 32
- Seeds: 8

Events
Singles	Doubles
- Gastein Ladies

Julia Görges was the defending champion, but lost to Laura Pous Tió in the first round.

María José Martínez Sánchez won the tournament beating home player Patricia Mayr-Achleitner in the final, 6–0, 7–5.

== Seeds ==
1. (Germany) Julia Görges (first round)
2. (Australia) Jarmila Gajdošová (first round)
3. (Czech Republic) Lucie Hradecká (first round)
4. (Czech Republic) Iveta Benešová (first round, retired due to right knee injury)
5. (Spain) Lourdes Domínguez Lino (first round)
6. (Romania) Simona Halep (first round)
7. (Czech Republic) Barbora Záhlavová-Strýcová (first round)
8. (Russia) Ksenia Pervak (semifinals)

== Draw ==
Key

- Q = Qualifier
- WC = Wild card
- LL = Lucky loser
- Alt = Alternate
- ITF = ITF entry
- PR = Protected ranking
- SR = Special ranking
- SE = Special exempt
- JE = Junior exempt
- JR = Junior Accelerator Programme entrant
- CO = College Accelerator Programme entrant
- NG = Next Gen Accelerator Program entrant
- w/o = Walkover
- r = Retired
- d = Defaulted

=== Finals ===
Semifinals
8	(Russia) Ksenia Pervak	0	0
WC	(Austria) Patricia Mayr-Achleitner	6	6
(Spain) María José Martínez Sánchez	6	7^{7}
(Ukraine) Kateryna Bondarenko	1	6^{5}

Final
WC	(Austria) Patricia Mayr-Achleitner	0	5
(Spain) María José Martínez Sánchez	6	7

=== Top half ===
First round
1	(Germany) J Görges	1	6	1
(Spain) L Pous Tió	6	2	6
(Germany) K Barrois	6	6
(Ukraine) L Tsurenko	2	3
(Russia) A Kudryavtseva	1	1
Q	(Slovenia) N Kolar	6	6
(France) A Cornet	6^{3}	2
8	(Russia) K Pervak	7^{7}	6
4	(Czech Republic) I Benešová	5	2	r
WC	(Austria) N Hofmanova	7	3
WC	(Austria) M Klaffner	1	0
Q	(Bulgaria) D Evtimova	6	6
Q	(Georgia (country)) S Shapatava	6	3	2
(Croatia) P Martić	3	6	6
WC	(Austria) P Mayr-Achleitner	6	7^{7}
5	(Spain) L Domínguez Lino	0	6^{5}

Second round
(Spain) L Pous Tió	7^{8}	7^{7}
(Germany) K Barrois	6^{6}	6^{5}
Q	(Slovenia) N Kolar	6	6^{8}	2
8	(Russia) K Pervak	4	7^{10}	6
WC	(Austria) N Hofmanova	6	4	3
Q	(Bulgaria) D Evtimova	3	6	6
(Croatia) P Martić	1	4
WC	(Austria) P Mayr-Achleitner	6	6

Quarterfinals
(Spain) L Pous Tió	2	6^{5}
8	(Russia) K Pervak	6	7^{7}
Q	(Bulgaria) D Evtimova	2	2
WC	(Austria) P Mayr-Achleitner	6	6

Semifinals
8	(Russia) K Pervak	0	0
WC	(Austria) P Mayr-Achleitner	6	6

=== Bottom half ===
First round
6	(Romania) S Halep	6	5	6^{6}
(Austria) S Bammer	4	7	7^{8}
(Ukraine) A Bondarenko	3	6^{6}
(Austria) Y Meusburger	6	7^{8}
Q	(Argentina) P Ormaechea	6^{5}	6^{4}
(Spain) MJ Martínez Sánchez	7^{7}	7^{7}
(Czech Republic) S Záhlavová	7	6
3	(Czech Republic) L Hradecká	5	3
7	(Czech Republic) B Záhlavová-Strýcová	6^{7}	2
(Spain) C Suárez Navarro	7^{9}	6
(Spain) A Parra Santonja	6	1	7^{7}
(Belarus) O Govortsova	3	6	6^{5}
(Ukraine) K Bondarenko	6	6
(Spain) N Llagostera Vives	0	4
(Sweden) J Larsson	6	6
2	(Australia) J Gajdošová	4	2

Second round
(Austria) S Bammer	2	1
(Austria) Y Meusburger	6	6
(Spain) MJ Martínez Sánchez	6	6
(Czech Republic) S Záhlavová	4	2
(Spain) C Suárez Navarro	6	6
(Spain) A Parra Santonja	3	3
(Ukraine) K Bondarenko	7	6
(Sweden) J Larsson	5	0

Quarterfinals
(Austria) Y Meusburger	6^{5}	6	3
(Spain) MJ Martínez Sánchez	7^{7}	4	6
(Spain) C Suárez Navarro	2	1
(Ukraine) K Bondarenko	6	6

Semifinals
(Spain) MJ Martínez Sánchez	6	7^{7}
(Ukraine) K Bondarenko	1	6^{5}
