= 2017 China Open – Women's singles =

Women's singles
- 2017 China Open

Final
- Champion: (France) Caroline Garcia
- Runner-up: (Romania) Simona Halep
- Score: 6–4, 7–6^{(7–3)}

Details
- Seeds: 16

Events
Singles	men	women
Doubles	men	women
- China Open

Caroline Garcia defeated Simona Halep in the final, 6–4, 7–6^{(7–3)} to win the women's singles tennis title at the 2017 China Open. As of 2026, Garcia is the only player to win singles titles in both Wuhan and Beijing in the same year.

Agnieszka Radwańska was the defending champion, but lost in the third round to Daria Kasatkina.

As a result of Garbiñe Muguruza's retirement in the first round, Halep attained the WTA no. 1 singles ranking for the first time at the end of the tournament by defeating Jeļena Ostapenko in the semifinals.

== Seeds ==
1. (Spain) Garbiñe Muguruza (first round, retired)
2. (Romania) Simona Halep (final)
3. (Ukraine) Elina Svitolina (quarterfinals)
4. (Czech Republic) Karolína Plíšková (third round)
5. (Denmark) Caroline Wozniacki (third round)
6. (United Kingdom) Johanna Konta (first round)
7. (Russia) Svetlana Kuznetsova (first round)
8. (Slovakia) Dominika Cibulková (first round)

9. (Latvia) Jeļena Ostapenko (semifinals)
10. (Germany) Angelique Kerber (second round)
11. (Poland) Agnieszka Radwańska (third round)
12. (Czech Republic) Petra Kvitová (semifinals)
13. (France) Kristina Mladenovic (first round)
14. (United States) CoCo Vandeweghe (second round, retired)
15. (United States) Sloane Stephens (first round)
16. (Latvia) Anastasija Sevastova (first round)

Click on the seed number of a player to go to their draw section.

The three Wuhan semifinalists who were accepted into the main draw received a bye into the second round. They were as follows:

- (Australia) Ashleigh Barty
- (France) Caroline Garcia
- (Latvia) Jeļena Ostapenko

Maria Sakkari, the fourth Wuhan semifinalist, did not have a ranking that qualified her for the main draw. Sakkari withdrew from the qualifying draw as she was still competing in Wuhan.

== Draw ==
Key

- Q = Qualifier
- WC = Wild card
- LL = Lucky loser
- Alt = Alternate
- ITF = ITF entry
- PR = Protected ranking
- SR = Special ranking
- SE = Special exempt
- JE = Junior exempt
- JR = Junior Accelerator Programme entrant
- CO = College Accelerator Programme entrant
- NG = Next Gen Accelerator Program entrant
- w/o = Walkover
- r = Retired
- d = Defaulted

=== Finals ===
Quarterfinals
(Czech Republic) Barbora Strýcová	3	4
12	(Czech Republic) Petra Kvitová	6	6
3	(Ukraine) Elina Svitolina	7^{7}	5	6^{6}
(France) Caroline Garcia	6^{5}	7	7^{8}
9	(Latvia) Jeļena Ostapenko	6	6
(Romania) Sorana Cîrstea	4	4
(Russia) Daria Kasatkina	2	1
2	(Romania) Simona Halep	6	6

Semifinals
12	(Czech Republic) Petra Kvitová	3	5
(France) Caroline Garcia	6	7
9	(Latvia) Jeļena Ostapenko	2	4
2	(Romania) Simona Halep	6	6

Final
(France) Caroline Garcia	6	7^{7}
2	(Romania) Simona Halep	4	6^{3}

=== Top half ===
==== Section 1 ====
First round
1	(Spain) G Muguruza	1	0^{r}
(Czech Republic) B Strýcová	6	2
Q	(United States) M Brengle	4	3
(Germany) J Görges	6	6
(Australia) D Gavrilova	7	7
(Estonia) A Kontaveit	5	5
(Croatia) D Vekić	2	2
14	(United States) C Vandeweghe	6	6
12	(Czech Republic) P Kvitová	6	7
(Czech Republic) Kr Plíšková	3	5
Q	(United States) V Lepchenko	5	6	6
(Ukraine) L Tsurenko	7	4	2
(Russia) A Pavlyuchenkova	6	6
(United States) L Davis	1	1
(China) Q Wang	1	7^{7}	1
5	(Denmark) C Wozniacki	6	6^{4}	6

Second round
(Czech Republic) B Strýcová	6	6
(Germany) J Görges	4	2
(Australia) D Gavrilova	6	2
14	(United States) C Vandeweghe	3	0^{r}
12	(Czech Republic) P Kvitová	6	6
Q	(United States) V Lepchenko	4	4
(Russia) A Pavlyuchenkova	2	2
5	(Denmark) C Wozniacki	6	6

Third round
(Czech Republic) B Strýcová	6	6
(Australia) D Gavrilova	0	4
12	(Czech Republic) P Kvitová	6	6
5	(Denmark) C Wozniacki	1	4

Quarterfinals
(Czech Republic) B Strýcová	3	4
12	(Czech Republic) P Kvitová	6	6

==== Section 2 ====
First round
3	(Ukraine) E Svitolina	6	6
WC	(China) L Zhu	3	2
(Russia) E Vesnina	6	0
Q	(Poland) M Linette	0	0^{r}
WC	(China) Y Duan	7	6
13	(France) K Mladenovic	5	4
10	(Germany) A Kerber	6	7
(Japan) N Osaka	2	5
WC	(China) Y Wang	3	5
(France) A Cornet	6	7
(Belgium) E Mertens	7^{7}	6
8	(Slovakia) D Cibulková	6^{4}	1

Second round
3	(Ukraine) E Svitolina	6	6
(Australia) A Barty	4	2
(Russia) E Vesnina	6	6
WC	(China) Y Duan	3	2
10	(Germany) A Kerber	4	4
(France) A Cornet	6	6
(France) C Garcia	7^{7}	6
(Belgium) E Mertens	6^{4}	4

Third round
3	(Ukraine) E Svitolina	6	7
(Russia) E Vesnina	2	5
(France) A Cornet	2	1
(France) C Garcia	6	6

Quarterfinals
3	(Ukraine) E Svitolina	7^{7}	5	6^{6}
(France) C Garcia	6^{5}	7	7^{8}

=== Bottom half ===
==== Section 3 ====
First round
6	(United Kingdom) J Konta	1	2
(Romania) M Niculescu	6	6
(United States) S Rogers	6^{3}	6	5
(China) S Peng	7^{7}	3	7
(Czech Republic) K Siniaková	3	2
(Australia) S Stosur	6	6
15/PR	(United States) S Stephens	3	0
Q	(United States) C McHale	6	6
(Germany) M Barthel	6^{4}	1
(Romania) S Cîrstea	7^{7}	6
Q	(Germany) A Petkovic	6	6
(Netherlands) K Bertens	4	0
(Spain) C Suárez Navarro	3	4
4	(Czech Republic) Ka Plíšková	6	6

Second round
(Romania) M Niculescu	3	2
(China) S Peng	6	6
(Australia) S Stosur	3	5
9	(Latvia) J Ostapenko	6	7
Q	(United States) C McHale	6^{4}	0
(Romania) S Cîrstea	7^{7}	6
Q	(Germany) A Petkovic	4	4
4	(Czech Republic) Ka Plíšková	6	6

Third round
(China) S Peng	0^{r}
9	(Latvia) J Ostapenko	3
(Romania) S Cîrstea	6	7
4	(Czech Republic) Ka Plíšková	1	5

Quarterfinals
9	(Latvia) J Ostapenko	6	6
(Romania) S Cîrstea	4	4

==== Section 4 ====
First round
7	(Russia) S Kuznetsova	7^{7}	5	1
Q	(Spain) L Arruabarrena	6^{2}	7	6
(Russia) N Vikhlyantseva	6^{5}	1
(Russia) D Kasatkina	7^{7}	6
(China) S Zhang	6	6
(Kazakhstan) Y Putintseva	4	4
Q	(Germany) C Witthöft	5	3
11	(Poland) A Radwańska	7	6
16	(Latvia) A Sevastova	6^{3}	7	6^{7}
WC	(Russia) M Sharapova	7^{7}	5	7^{9}
Q	(United States) J Brady	3	3
(Russia) E Makarova	6	6
(Slovakia) M Rybáriková	6	6
WC	(Canada) E Bouchard	4	3
(United States) A Riske	3	6	2
2	(Romania) S Halep	6	3	6

Second round
Q	(Spain) L Arruabarrena	4	5
(Russia) D Kasatkina	6	7
(China) S Zhang	5	5
11	(Poland) A Radwańska	7	7
WC	(Russia) M Sharapova	6	4	6
(Russia) E Makarova	4	6	1
(Slovakia) M Rybáriková	1	1^{r}
2	(Romania) S Halep	6	2

Third round
(Russia) D Kasatkina	4	7	6
11	(Poland) A Radwańska	6	5	2
WC	(Russia) M Sharapova	2	2
2	(Romania) S Halep	6	6

Quarterfinals
(Russia) D Kasatkina	2	1
2	(Romania) S Halep	6	6

== Qualifying ==
=== Seeds ===
1. (United States) Shelby Rogers (moved to main draw)
2. (Brazil) Beatriz Haddad Maia (first round)
3. (Kazakhstan) Zarina Diyas (qualifying competition)
4. (Russia) Natalia Vikhlyantseva (moved to main draw)
5. (United States) Jennifer Brady (qualified)
6. (Germany) Carina Witthöft (qualified)
7. (United Kingdom) Heather Watson (first round)
8. (Paraguay) Verónica Cepede Royg (first round)
9. (United States) Varvara Lepchenko (qualified)
10. (Puerto Rico) Monica Puig (qualifying competition)
11. (United States) Christina McHale (qualified)
12. (Greece) Maria Sakkari (withdrew, still competing in Wuhan)
13. (United States) Madison Brengle (qualified)
14. (Poland) Magda Linette (qualified)
15. (Tunisia) Ons Jabeur (qualifying competition)
16. (Spain) Lara Arruabarrena (qualified)
17. (Spain) Sara Sorribes Tormo (qualifying competition)
18. (Chinese Taipei) Hsieh Su-wei (qualifying competition)
19. (Belarus) Aliaksandra Sasnovich (qualifying competition)

=== Qualifiers ===
1. (United States) Varvara Lepchenko
2. (Germany) Andrea Petkovic
3. (Spain) Lara Arruabarrena
4. (United States) Madison Brengle
5. (United States) Jennifer Brady
6. (Germany) Carina Witthöft
7. (United States) Christina McHale
8. (Poland) Magda Linette

=== Draw ===
==== First qualifier ====
First round
19	(Belarus) Aliaksandra Sasnovich	6	6
PR	(Russia) Alla Kudryavtseva	3	0
(China) Liu Fangzhou	6	4	4
9	(United States) Varvara Lepchenko	4	6	6

Qualifying competition
19	(Belarus) Aliaksandra Sasnovich	6	3	4
9	(United States) Varvara Lepchenko	0	6	6

==== Second qualifier ====
First round
2	(Brazil) Beatriz Haddad Maia	3	3
(Germany) Andrea Petkovic	6	6
(United States) Kristie Ahn	7^{7}	4	5
17	(Spain) Sara Sorribes Tormo	6^{3}	6	7

Qualifying competition
(Germany) Andrea Petkovic	6	6
17	(Spain) Sara Sorribes Tormo	0	4

==== Third qualifier ====
First round
3	(Kazakhstan) Zarina Diyas	6	6
Alt	(Canada) Gabriela Dabrowski	2	2
WC	(China) Liu Yanni	1	1
16	(Spain) Lara Arruabarrena	6	6

Qualifying competition
3	(Kazakhstan) Zarina Diyas	6	3	5
16	(Spain) Lara Arruabarrena	3	6	7

==== Fourth qualifier ====
First round
18	(Chinese Taipei) Hsieh Su-wei	2	6	6
Alt	(China) Lu Jiajing	6	3	3
(China) Han Xinyun	4	1
13	(United States) Madison Brengle	6	6

Qualifying competition
18	(Chinese Taipei) Hsieh Su-wei	3	2
13	(United States) Madison Brengle	6	6

==== Fifth qualifier ====
First round
5	(United States) Jennifer Brady	6	6
(Montenegro) Danka Kovinić	4	1
WC	(Switzerland) Jil Teichmann	4	1
10	(Puerto Rico) Monica Puig	6	6

Qualifying competition
5	(United States) Jennifer Brady	6	6
10	(Puerto Rico) Monica Puig	4	4

==== Sixth qualifier ====
First round
6	(Germany) Carina Witthöft	6	6
(Australia) Lizette Cabrera	0	2
Alt	(China) Xun Fangying	3	2
15	(Tunisia) Ons Jabeur	6	6

Qualifying competition
6	(Germany) Carina Witthöft	6	6
15	(Tunisia) Ons Jabeur	4	1

==== Seventh qualifier ====
First round
7	(United Kingdom) Heather Watson	7^{7}	4	4
(United States) Nicole Gibbs	6^{3}	6	6
(Belarus) Aryna Sabalenka	6	1	4
11	(United States) Christina McHale	1	6	6

Qualifying competition
(United States) Nicole Gibbs	4	6	4
11	(United States) Christina McHale	6	3	6

==== Eighth qualifier ====
First round
8	(Paraguay) Verónica Cepede Royg	4	6	1
WC	(China) Gao Xinyu	6	2	6
(Chinese Taipei) Chang Kai-chen	2	2
14	(Poland) Magda Linette	6	6

Qualifying competition
WC	(China) Gao Xinyu	2	6	1
14	(Poland) Magda Linette	6	2	6
