= 2019 Fed Cup World Group play-offs =

Part of tennis tournament

The Fed Cup is an annual tournament between national teams in women's tennis. The four losing teams in the World Group first round ties and four winners of the World Group II ties competed in the World Group play-offs.

At the time of the ties taking place, it was expected that the winners would secure a place in the World Group for 2020, while the losers would be relegated to World Group II, in accordance with the existing competition structure.

However, the restructuring of the Fed Cup for 2020 announced on 27 June 2019 stipulated that all eight nations which participated in the World Group play-offs would enter into the 2020 Fed Cup Qualifiers. Consequently, the results of the 2019 World Group play-off ties had no bearing on promotion or relegation for the following year.

Participating teams
Belgium	Canada	Czech Republic	Germany
Latvia	Spain	Switzerland	United States

== Seeding ==
The seeding was announced on 11 February 2019.

Seeds:

1. Czech Republic
2. United States
3. Germany
4. Belgium

Remaining nations:

1. Canada
2. Latvia
3. Spain
4. Switzerland

== Czech Republic vs. Canada ==
Czech Republic
4
Agrofert Arena, Prostějov, Czech Republic
20–21 April
Clay (indoor)

Canada
0

			1	2	3
1	(Czech Republic) (Canada)	Karolína Muchová; Rebecca Marino	6; 3	6; 0
2	(Czech Republic) (Canada)	Markéta Vondroušová; Leylah Annie Fernandez	6; 4	6; 1
3	(Czech Republic) (Canada)	Markéta Vondroušová; Rebecca Marino	6; 3	6; 4
4	(Czech Republic) (Canada)	Karolína Muchová; Leylah Annie Fernandez				not played
5	(Czech Republic) (Canada)	Barbora Krejčíková / Lucie Šafářová; Gabriela Dabrowski / Sharon Fichman	7^{7} 6^{4}	7; 5

== United States vs. Switzerland ==
United States
3
Freeman Coliseum, San Antonio, United States
20–21 April
Hard (indoor)

Switzerland
2

			1	2	3
1	(United States) (Switzerland)	Madison Keys; Viktorija Golubic	2; 6	3; 6
2	(United States) (Switzerland)	Sloane Stephens; Timea Bacsinszky	6; 4	6; 3
3	(United States) (Switzerland)	Sloane Stephens; Viktorija Golubic	6; 3	6; 2
4	(United States) (Switzerland)	Sofia Kenin; Timea Bacsinszky	6; 3	7^{7} 6^{4}
5	(United States) (Switzerland)	Jennifer Brady / Jessica Pegula; Ylena In-Albon / Conny Perrin	5; 7	2; 6

== Latvia vs. Germany ==
Latvia
1
Arēna Rīga, Riga, Latvia
19–20 April
Hard (indoor)

Germany
3

			1	2	3
1	(Latvia) (Germany)	Jeļena Ostapenko; Andrea Petkovic	5; 7	4; 6
2	(Latvia) (Germany)	Diāna Marcinkēviča; Julia Görges	4; 6	6; 4	1; 6
3	(Latvia) (Germany)	Jeļena Ostapenko; Mona Barthel	4; 6	3; 6
4	(Latvia) (Germany)	Diāna Marcinkēviča; Andrea Petkovic				not played
5	(Latvia) (Germany)	Jeļena Ostapenko / Daniela Vismane; Anna-Lena Grönefeld / Andrea Petkovic	6; 1	6; 3

== Belgium vs. Spain ==
Belgium
2
Sportcampus Lange Munte, Kortrijk, Belgium
20–21 April
Hard (indoor)

Spain
3

			1	2	3
1	(Belgium) (Spain)	Kirsten Flipkens; Garbiñe Muguruza	6; 3	4; 6	6; 4
2	(Belgium) (Spain)	Alison Van Uytvanck; Carla Suárez Navarro	3; 6	2; 6
3	(Belgium) (Spain)	Ysaline Bonaventure; Garbiñe Muguruza	6; 4	0; 6	6; 4
4	(Belgium) (Spain)	Yanina Wickmayer; Carla Suárez Navarro	2; 6	1; 6
5	(Belgium) (Spain)	Ysaline Bonaventure / Kirsten Flipkens; Garbiñe Muguruza / Carla Suárez Navarro	6^{4} 7^{7}	6; 2	2; 6
