= 2017 China Open (tennis) =

- Date: 2 October – 8 October
- Edition: 19th (ATP) / 21st (WTA)
- Category: ATP World Tour 500 (men); Premier Mandatory (women)
- Prize money: ATP $2,916,550; WTA $6,289,521
- Surface: Hard
- Location: Beijing, China
- Venue: National Tennis Center

Champions

Men's singles
- (Spain) Rafael Nadal

Women's singles
- (France) Caroline Garcia

Men's doubles
- (Finland) Henri Kontinen / (Australia) John Peers

Women's doubles
- (Chinese Taipei) Chan Yung-jan / (Switzerland) Martina Hingis
| ← 2016 · | China Open (tennis) | · 2018 → |

The 2017 China Open was a tennis tournament played on outdoor hard courts. It was the 19th edition of the China Open for the men (21st for the women). It was part of ATP World Tour 500 series on the 2017 ATP World Tour, and the last WTA Premier Mandatory tournament of the 2017 WTA Tour. Both the men's and the women's events were held at the National Tennis Center in Beijing, China, from October 2 to October 8, 2017.

== Points and prize money ==
=== Point distribution ===
| Event | W | F | SF | QF | Round of 16 | Round of 32 | Round of 64 | Q | Q2 | Q1 |
| Men's singles | 500 | 300 | 180 | 90 | 45 | 0 | — | 20 | 10 | 0 |
| Men's doubles | 500 | 300 | 180 | 90 | 0 | — | — | — | — | — |
| Women's singles | 1,000 | 650 | 390 | 215 | 120 | 65 | 10 | 30 | 20 | 2 |
| Women's doubles | 1,000 | 650 | 390 | 215 | 120 | 10 | — | — | — | — |

=== Prize money ===
| Event | W | F | SF | QF | Round of 16 | Round of 32 | Round of 64 | Q2 | Q1 |
| Men's singles | $652,370 | $319,825 | $160,930 | $81,845 | $42,505 | $22,415 | — | $5,160 | $2,630 |
| Men's doubles | $196,420 | $96,160 | $48,230 | $24,755 | $12,800 | — | — | — | — |
| Women's singles | $1,271,525 | $636,300 | $310,455 | $149,138 | $71,774 | $34,744 | $19,960 | $4,650 | $2,702 |
| Women's doubles | $430,180 | $215,865 | $96,100 | $44,354 | $20,700 | $9,615 | — | — | — |

== ATP singles main-draw entrants ==
=== Seeds ===
| Country | Player | Rank^{1} | Seed |
|---|---|---|---|
| ESP | Rafael Nadal | 1 | 1 |
| GER | Alexander Zverev | 4 | 2 |
| BUL | Grigor Dimitrov | 8 | 3 |
| ESP | Pablo Carreño Busta | 10 | 4 |
| ESP | Roberto Bautista Agut | 13 | 5 |
| USA | John Isner | 17 | 6 |
| CZE | Tomáš Berdych | 19 | 7 |
| AUS | Nick Kyrgios | 20 | 8 |

- ^{1} Rankings are as of September 25, 2017

=== Other entrants ===
The following players received wildcards into the singles main draw:

- (Argentina) Juan Martín del Potro
- (China) Wu Di
- (China) Zhang Ze

The following player received entry as a special exempt:

- (Bosnia and Herzegovina) Damir Džumhur

The following players received entry from the qualifying draw:

- (Belgium) Steve Darcis
- (Spain) Marcel Granollers
- (Tunisia) Malek Jaziri
- (Serbia) Dušan Lajović

=== Withdrawals ===
Before the tournament

- (Spain) David Ferrer →replaced by (Argentina) Leonardo Mayer
- (Germany) Philipp Kohlschreiber →replaced by (Russia) Andrey Rublev
- (United Kingdom) Andy Murray →replaced by (United States) Jared Donaldson
- (France) Jo-Wilfried Tsonga →replaced by (Germany) Jan-Lennard Struff

=== Retirements ===
- (United Kingdom) Aljaž Bedene
- (Belgium) Steve Darcis

== ATP doubles main-draw entrants ==
=== Seeds ===
| Country | Player | Country | Player | Rank^{1} | Seed |
|---|---|---|---|---|---|
| FIN | Henri Kontinen | AUS | John Peers | 3 | 1 |
| POL | Łukasz Kubot | BRA | Marcelo Melo | 7 | 2 |
| AUT | Oliver Marach | CRO | Mate Pavić | 39 | 3 |
| IND | Rohan Bopanna | URU | Pablo Cuevas | 45 | 4 |

- Rankings are as of September 25, 2017

=== Other entrants ===
The following pairs received wildcards into the doubles main draw:

- (Argentina) Juan Martín del Potro / (Argentina) Leonardo Mayer
- (China) Gong Maoxin / (China) Zhang Ze

The following pair received entry from the qualifying draw:

- (Netherlands) Wesley Koolhof / (New Zealand) Artem Sitak

== WTA singles main-draw entrants ==
=== Seeds ===
The following are the seeded players. Seedings are based on WTA rankings as of 25 September 2017. Rankings and points before are as of 2 October 2017.

| Seed | Rank | Player | Points before | Points defending | Points won | Points after | Status |
|---|---|---|---|---|---|---|---|
| 1 | 1 | (Spain) Garbiñe Muguruza | 6,245 | 120 | 10 | 6,135 | First round retired against (Czech Republic) Barbora Strýcová |
| 2 | 2 | (Romania) Simona Halep | 5,645 | 120 | 650 | 6,175 | Runner-up, lost to (France) Caroline Garcia |
| 3 | 3 | (Ukraine) Elina Svitolina | 5,640 | 390 | 215 | 5,465 | Quarterfinals lost to (France) Caroline Garcia |
| 4 | 4 | (Czech Republic) Karolína Plíšková | 5,605 | 120 | 120 | 5,605 | Third round lost to (Romania) Sorana Cîrstea |
| 5 | 6 | (Denmark) Caroline Wozniacki | 4,640 | 120 | 120 | 4,640 | Third round lost to (Czech Republic) Petra Kvitová [12] |
| 6 | 7 | (United Kingdom) Johanna Konta | 4,435 | 650 | 10 | 3,795 | First round lost to (Romania) Monica Niculescu |
| 7 | 9 | (Russia) Svetlana Kuznetsova | 4,115 | 120 | 10 | 4,005 | First round lost to (Spain) Lara Arruabarrena [Q] |
| 8 | 10 | (Slovakia) Dominika Cibulková | 3,330 | 10 | 10 | 3,330 | First round lost to (Belgium) Elise Mertens |
| 9 | 8 | (Latvia) Jeļena Ostapenko | 4,130 | 10 | 390 | 4,510 | Semifinals lost to (Romania) Simona Halep [2] |
| 10 | 12 | (Germany) Angelique Kerber | 3,236 | 120 | 65 | 3,181 | Second round lost to (France) Alizé Cornet |
| 11 | 11 | (Poland) Agnieszka Radwańska | 3,250 | 1,000 | 120 | 2,370 | Third round lost to (Russia) Daria Kasatkina |
| 12 | 18 | (Czech Republic) Petra Kvitová | 2,357 | 215 | 390 | 2,532 | Semifinals lost to (France) Caroline Garcia |
| 13 | 14 | (France) Kristina Mladenovic | 3,090 | 65 | 10 | 2,981 | First round lost to (China) Duan Yingying [WC] |
| 14 | 16 | (United States) CoCo Vandeweghe | 2,764 | 10 | 10 | 2,764 | First round retired against (Australia) Daria Gavrilova |
| 15 | 17 | (United States) Sloane Stephens | 2,712 | 0 | 10 | 2,722 | First round lost to (United States) Christina McHale [Q] |
| 16 | 19 | (Latvia) Anastasija Sevastova | 2,295 | 10 | 10 | 2,295 | First round lost to (Russia) Maria Sharapova [WC] |

=== Other entrants ===
The following players received wildcards into the singles main draw:

- (Canada) Eugenie Bouchard
- (China) Duan Yingying
- (Russia) Maria Sharapova
- (China) Wang Yafan
- (China) Zhu Lin

The following players received entry using a protected ranking into the singles main draw:

- (United States) Sloane Stephens

The following players received entry from the qualifying draw:

- (Spain) Lara Arruabarrena
- (United States) Jennifer Brady
- (United States) Madison Brengle
- (United States) Varvara Lepchenko
- (Poland) Magda Linette
- (United States) Christina McHale
- (Germany) Andrea Petkovic
- (Germany) Carina Witthöft

=== Withdrawals ===
Before the tournament

- (Switzerland) Timea Bacsinszky →replaced by (Croatia) Donna Vekić
- (United States) Catherine Bellis →replaced by (China) Wang Qiang
- (France) Océane Dodin →replaced by (Romania) Monica Niculescu
- (United States) Madison Keys →replaced by (United States) Shelby Rogers
- (Croatia) Ana Konjuh →replaced by (United States) Alison Riske
- (Croatia) Mirjana Lučić-Baroni →replaced by (Kazakhstan) Yulia Putintseva
- (Czech Republic) Lucie Šafářová →replaced by (Romania) Sorana Cîrstea
- (Italy) Roberta Vinci →replaced by (Russia) Natalia Vikhlyantseva
- (United States) Serena Williams →replaced by (France) Alizé Cornet
- (United States) Venus Williams →replaced by (Germany) Mona Barthel

=== Retirements ===
- (Poland) Magda Linette
- (Spain) Garbiñe Muguruza
- (China) Peng Shuai
- (Slovakia) Magdaléna Rybáriková
- (United States) CoCo Vandeweghe

== WTA doubles main-draw entrants ==
=== Seeds ===
| Country | Player | Country | Player | Rank^{1} | Seed |
|---|---|---|---|---|---|
| TPE | Chan Yung-jan | SUI | Martina Hingis | 5 | 1 |
| RUS | Ekaterina Makarova | RUS | Elena Vesnina | 10 | 2 |
| IND | Sania Mirza | CHN | Peng Shuai | 17 | 3 |
| HUN | Tímea Babos | CZE | Andrea Hlaváčková | 24 | 4 |
| CZE | Kateřina Siniaková | CZE | Barbora Strýcová | 25 | 5 |
| AUS | Ashleigh Barty | AUS | Casey Dellacqua | 28 | 6 |
| CAN | Gabriela Dabrowski | CHN | Xu Yifan | 37 | 7 |
| GER | Anna-Lena Grönefeld | CZE | Květa Peschke | 42 | 8 |

- ^{1} Rankings are as of September 25, 2017

=== Other entrants ===
The following pairs received wildcards into the doubles main draw:

- (China) Han Xinyun / (China) Liang Chen
- (China) Wang Qiang / (China) Wang Yafan

The following pair received entry as alternates:

- (United States) Lauren Davis / (United States) Alison Riske

=== Withdrawals ===
Before the tournament

- (France) Kristina Mladenovic

== Champions ==
=== Men's singles ===
- (Spain) Rafael Nadal def. (Australia) Nick Kyrgios, 6–2, 6–1

=== Women's singles ===
- (France) Caroline Garcia def. (Romania) Simona Halep, 6–4, 7–6^{(7–3)}

=== Men's doubles ===
- (Finland) Henri Kontinen / (Australia) John Peers def. (United States) John Isner / (United States) Jack Sock, 6–3, 3–6, [10–7]

=== Women's doubles ===
- (Chinese Taipei) Chan Yung-jan / (Switzerland) Martina Hingis def. (Hungary) Tímea Babos / (Czech Republic) Andrea Hlaváčková, 6–1, 6–4
