= 2013 Gastein Ladies – Singles =

Singles
- 2013 Gastein Ladies

Final
- Champion: (Austria) Yvonne Meusburger
- Runner-up: (Czech Republic) Andrea Hlaváčková
- Score: 7–5, 6–2

Details
- Draw: 32
- Seeds: 8

Events
Singles	Doubles
← 2012 ·	Gastein Ladies	· 2014 →

Alizé Cornet was the defending champion, but withdrew before the tournament began.
Yvonne Meusburger defeated Andrea Hlaváčková 7–5, 6–2 in the final for her first WTA title.

== Seeds ==
1. (Germany) Mona Barthel (second round, retired)
2. (Germany) Annika Beck (quarterfinals)
3. (Romania) Irina-Camelia Begu (second round)
4. (Germany) Andrea Petkovic (first round)
5. (Netherlands) Kiki Bertens (first round)
6. (South Africa) Chanelle Scheepers (second round)
7. (Spain) María Teresa Torró Flor (first round)
8. (Italy) Karin Knapp (semifinals)

== Draw ==
=== Key ===
- Q = Qualifier
- WC = Wild card
- LL = Lucky loser
- Alt = Alternate
- SE = Special exempt
- PR = Protected ranking
- ITF = ITF entry
- JE = Junior exempt
- w/o = Walkover
- r = Retired
- d = Defaulted
- SR = Special ranking

=== Finals ===
Semifinals
(Czech Republic) Andrea Hlaváčková	7	6^{1}	6
(Ukraine) Elina Svitolina	5	7^{7}	4
(Austria) Yvonne Meusburger	6	6
8	(Italy) Karin Knapp	4	3

Final
(Czech Republic) Andrea Hlaváčková	5	2
(Austria) Yvonne Meusburger	7	6

=== Top half ===
First round
1	(Germany) M Barthel	6	6
(United States) C Scholl	0	0
Q	(Romania) E Bogdan	6^{6}	6	4
WC	(Austria) L-M Moser	7^{8}	2	6
(Greece) E Daniilidou	3	1
(Czech Republic) A Hlaváčková	6	6
Q	(Switzerland) V Golubic	6	6
5	(Netherlands) K Bertens	2	2
4	(Germany) A Petkovic	7^{7}	5	3
(Croatia) P Martić	6^{5}	7	6
WC	(Austria) P Mayr-Achleitner	6	6
(Croatia) T Mrdeža	4	3
(Ukraine) E Svitolina	6	6
Q	(Slovakia) M Hončová	2	2
(Slovakia) AK Schmiedlová	1	4
6	(South Africa) C Scheepers	6	6

Second round
1	(Germany) M Barthel	2	3^{r}
WC	(Austria) L-M Moser	6	4
(Czech Republic) A Hlaváčková	5	6	6
Q	(Switzerland) V Golubic	7	1	0
(Croatia) P Martić	4	4
WC	(Austria) P Mayr-Achleitner	6	6
(Ukraine) E Svitolina	7	1	6
6	(South Africa) C Scheepers	5	6	1

Quarterfinals
WC	(Austria) L-M Moser	3	6^{4}
(Czech Republic) A Hlaváčková	6	7^{7}
WC	(Austria) P Mayr-Achleitner	3	0
(Ukraine) E Svitolina	6	6

Semifinals
(Czech Republic) A Hlaváčková	7	6^{1}	6
(Ukraine) E Svitolina	5	7^{7}	4

=== Bottom half ===
First round
7	(Spain) MT Torró Flor	5	7	4
(Netherlands) A Rus	7	5	6
(Spain) E Cabeza Candela	6	6
(Slovenia) T Majerič	1	3
Q	(Bosnia and Herzegovina) J Tinjić	0	0
(Austria) Y Meusburger	6	6
WC	(Germany) C Witthöft	3	3
3	(Romania) I-C Begu	6	6
8	(Italy) K Knapp	6	6
(Russia) V Solovyeva	3	2
(Romania) A Cadanțu	6	6
(Portugal) MJ Koehler	2	4
(Luxembourg) M Minella	6	2	6
LL	(Bulgaria) D Evtimova	2	6	3
(Israel) S Pe'er	5	3
2	(Germany) A Beck	7	6

Second round
(Netherlands) A Rus	5	7	6
(Spain) E Cabeza Candela	7	5	3
(Austria) Y Meusburger	6	6
3	(Romania) I-C Begu	3	3
8	(Italy) K Knapp	7^{7}	4	6
(Romania) A Cadanțu	6^{5}	6	1
(Luxembourg) M Minella	6	4	4
2	(Germany) A Beck	2	6	6

Quarterfinals
(Netherlands) A Rus	1	6^{1}
(Austria) Y Meusburger	6	7^{7}
8	(Italy) K Knapp	6	6
2	(Germany) A Beck	0	1

Semifinals
(Austria) Y Meusburger	6	6
8	(Italy) K Knapp	4	3

== Qualifying ==
=== Seeds ===
1. (Russia) Valeria Solovyeva (moved to main draw)
2. (United States) Chiara Scholl (moved to main draw)
3. (Romania) Raluca Olaru (first round)
4. (Bulgaria) Elitsa Kostova (first round)
5. (Czech Republic) Tereza Smitková (first round)
6. (Bosnia and Herzegovina) Jasmina Tinjić (qualified)
7. (Slovakia) Michaela Hončová (qualified)
8. (France) Myrtille Georges (first round)
9. (Bulgaria) Dia Evtimova (qualifying competition, lucky loser)
10. (Switzerland) Viktorija Golubic (qualified)

=== Qualifiers ===
1. (Bosnia and Herzegovina) Jasmina Tinjić
2. (Switzerland) Viktorija Golubic
3. (Romania) Elena Bogdan
4. (Slovakia) Michaela Hončová

=== Lucky loser ===
1. (Bulgaria) Dia Evtimova

=== Qualifying draw ===
==== First qualifier ====
First round
9	(Bulgaria) Dia Evtimova	6	6
(Serbia) Tamara Čurović	3	1
(Germany) Anna Zaja	6	6
WC	(Italy) Claudia Coppola	2	1
(Bulgaria) Isabella Shinikova	7^{9}	6^{4}	4
(Germany) Kristina Barrois	6^{7}	7^{7}	6
(Italy) Anna Remondina	6	2	2
6	(Bosnia and Herzegovina) Jasmina Tinjić	2	6	6

Second round
9	(Bulgaria) Dia Evtimova	6	6
(Germany) Anna Zaja	1	3
(Germany) Kristina Barrois	7	5	2
6	(Bosnia and Herzegovina) Jasmina Tinjić	5	7	6

Qualifying competition
9	(Bulgaria) Dia Evtimova	1	5
6	(Bosnia and Herzegovina) Jasmina Tinjić	6	7

==== Second qualifier ====
First round
10	(Switzerland) Viktorija Golubic	6	6^{5}	6
(Ukraine) Veronika Kapshay	3	7^{7}	4
(Slovenia) Nastja Kolar	2	6	1
(Spain) Inés Ferrer Suárez	6	1	6
WC	(Austria) Pia König	5	3
Alt	(South Africa) Natalie Grandin	7	6
(Serbia) Barbara Bonić	0	7^{9}	6
8	(France) Myrtille Georges	6	6^{7}	4

Second round
10	(Switzerland) Viktorija Golubic	2	6	6
(Spain) Inés Ferrer Suárez	6	1	3
Alt	(South Africa) Natalie Grandin	6	6
(Serbia) Barbara Bonić	3	1

Qualifying competition
10	(Switzerland) Viktorija Golubic	6	4	7
Alt	(South Africa) Natalie Grandin	3	6	5

==== Third qualifier ====
First round
3	(Romania) Raluca Olaru	6	4	3
(Slovakia) Lenka Juríková	4	6	6
(Italy) Francesca Palmigiano	1	2
(Romania) Ana Bogdan	6	6
(Romania) Elena Bogdan	6	6
5	(Czech Republic) Tereza Smitková	1	1

Second round
(Slovakia) Lenka Juríková	6^{4}	4
(Romania) Ana Bogdan	7^{7}	6
(Austria) Janina Toljan	6	3	5
(Romania) Elena Bogdan	3	6	7

Qualifying competition
(Romania) Ana Bogdan	3	5
(Romania) Elena Bogdan	6	7

==== Fourth qualifier ====
First round
4	(Bulgaria) Elitsa Kostova	2	2
(Bulgaria) Aleksandrina Naydenova	6	6
WC	(Austria) Yvonne Neuwirth	6	6
(Greece) Stamatia Fafaliou	1	0
(Serbia) Teodora Mirčić	6	3	2
(Switzerland) Conny Perrin	2	6	6
WC	(Bosnia and Herzegovina) Anita Husarić	4	4
7	(Slovakia) Michaela Hončová	6	6

Second round
(Bulgaria) Aleksandrina Naydenova	5	6	3
WC	(Austria) Yvonne Neuwirth	7	0	6
(Switzerland) Conny Perrin	7	5	2
7	(Slovakia) Michaela Hončová	5	7	6

Qualifying competition
WC	(Austria) Yvonne Neuwirth	6^{4}	6	3
7	(Slovakia) Michaela Hončová	7^{7}	3	6
