= 2014 Gastein Ladies =

- Date: 7–13 July
- Edition: 8th
- Category: WTA International
- Draw: 32S / 16D
- Prize money: $250,000
- Surface: Clay / outdoor
- Location: Bad Gastein, Austria

Champions

Singles
- (Germany) Andrea Petkovic

Doubles
- (Czech Republic) Karolína Plíšková / (Czech Republic) Kristýna Plíšková
← 2013 ·	Gastein Ladies	· 2015 →

The 2014 Nürnberger Gastein Ladies was the 2014 edition of the women's tennis tournament. It was the eighth edition of the Gastein Ladies tournament, which was part of the WTA International series of the 2014 WTA Tour. It was played on outdoor clay courts in Bad Gastein, Austria between 7 July and 13 July 2014. Fourth-seeded Andrea Petkovic won the singles title.

== Finals ==
=== Singles ===
- (Germany) Andrea Petkovic defeated (United States) Shelby Rogers, 6–3, 6–3
- It was Petkovic's 2nd singles title of the year and the 4th of her career.

=== Doubles ===
- (Czech Republic) Karolína Plíšková / (Czech Republic) Kristýna Plíšková defeated (Slovenia) Andreja Klepač / (Spain) María Teresa Torró Flor, 4–6, 6–3, [10–6]

== Points and prize money ==
=== Point distribution ===
Event	W	F	SF	QF	Round of 16	Round of 32	Q	Q2	Q1
Singles	280	180	110	60	30	1	18	12	1
Doubles	280	180	110	60	1	—	—	—	—

=== Prize money ===
Event	W	F	SF	QF	Round of 16	Round of 32	Q2	Q1
Singles	€34,677	€17,258	€9,274	€4,980	€2,742	€1,694	€823	€484
Doubles	€9,919	€5,161	€2,770	€1,468	€774	—	—	—

== Singles main-draw entrants ==
=== Seeds ===
Country	Player	Rank^{1}	Seed
~~ITA~~	~~Flavia Pennetta~~	~~12~~	~~1~~
ITA	Sara Errani	14	2
ESP	Carla Suárez Navarro	15	3
GER	Andrea Petkovic	20	4
UKR	Elina Svitolina	35	5
AUT	Yvonne Meusburger	38	6
ITA	Camila Giorgi	39	7
CZE	Karolína Plíšková	50	8

- ^{1} Rankings are as of June 23, 2014

=== Other entrants ===
The following players received wildcards into the singles main draw:

- (Austria) Lisa-Maria Moser
- (Austria) Yvonne Neuwirth
- (Italy) Flavia Pennetta

The following players received entry from the qualifying draw:

- (Romania) Ana Bogdan
- (United States) Irina Falconi
- (United States) Shelby Rogers
- (Germany) Laura Siegemund
- (Czech Republic) Kateřina Siniaková
- (Czech Republic) Tereza Smitková

The following player received entry as a lucky loser:

- (Spain) Beatriz García Vidagany

=== Withdrawals ===
Before the tournament

- (Croatia) Mirjana Lučić-Baroni
- (Italy) Flavia Pennetta
- (Czech Republic) Lucie Šafářová

== Doubles main-draw entrants ==
=== Seeds ===
Country	Player	Country	Player	Rank^{1}	Seed
~~GER~~	~~Julia Görges~~	~~ITA~~	~~Flavia Pennetta~~	~~57~~	~~1~~
CZE	Karolína Plíšková	CZE	Kristýna Plíšková	131	2
CAN	Gabriela Dabrowski	POL	Alicja Rosolska	135	3
GER	Kristina Barrois	GRE	Eleni Daniilidou	148	4
SLO	Andreja Klepač	ESP	María Teresa Torró Flor	227	5

- ^{1} Rankings as of June 23, 2014.

=== Other entrants ===
The following pairs received wildcards into the main draw:

- (Austria) Lisa-Maria Moser / (Germany) Laura Siegemund
- (Austria) Yvonne Neuwirth / (Austria) Janina Toljan

The following pair received entry as alternates:

- (Argentina) Paula Ormaechea / (Germany) Dinah Pfizenmaier

=== Withdrawals ===
Before the tournament

- (Italy) Flavia Pennetta
