= 2014 Gastein Ladies – Singles =

Women's tennis tournament

Singles
- 2014 Gastein Ladies

Final
- Champion: (Germany) Andrea Petkovic
- Runner-up: (United States) Shelby Rogers
- Score: 6–3, 6–3

Details
- Draw: 32
- Seeds: 8

Events
| Singles | Doubles |
| ← 2013 · | Gastein Ladies | · 2015 → |

Yvonne Meusburger was the defending champion, but lost to Chanelle Scheepers in the second round.

Andrea Petkovic won the title, defeating qualifier Shelby Rogers in the final, 6–3, 6–3.

== Seeds ==
1. (Italy) Flavia Pennetta (withdrew)
2. (Italy) Sara Errani (semifinals)
3. (Spain) Carla Suárez Navarro (second round)
4. (Germany) Andrea Petkovic (champion)
5. (Ukraine) Elina Svitolina (second round)
6. (Austria) Yvonne Meusburger (second round)
7. (Italy) Camila Giorgi (quarterfinals)
8. (Czech Republic) Karolína Plíšková (quarterfinals)

== Draw ==
=== Key ===
- Q = Qualifier
- WC = Wild card
- LL = Lucky loser
- Alt = Alternate
- SE = Special exempt
- PR = Protected ranking
- ITF = ITF entry
- JE = Junior exempt
- w/o = Walkover
- r = Retired
- d = Defaulted
- SR = Special ranking

=== Finals ===
Semifinals
(United States) Grace Min | 6 | 2 | 4
4 | (Germany) Andrea Petkovic | 4 | 6 | 6
Q | (United States) Shelby Rogers | 7^{14} | 6
2 | (Italy) Sara Errani | 6^{12} | 3

Final
4 | (Germany) Andrea Petkovic | 6 | 6
Q | (United States) Shelby Rogers | 3 | 3

=== Top half ===
First round
LL | (Spain) B García Vidagany | 3 | 2
(United States) G Min | 6 | 6
Q | (United States) I Falconi | 6 | 6
(Sweden) J Larsson | 3 | 3
Q | (Romania) A Bogdan | 6 | 3
(Croatia) A Tomljanović | 3 | 0^{r}
(Germany) M Barthel | 4 | 4
8 | (Czech Republic) Ka Plíšková | 6 | 6
4 | (Germany) A Petkovic | 7^{10} | 7
(Slovakia) J Čepelová | 6^{8} | 5
(Spain) MT Torró Flor | 7^{7} | 1 | 4
(Germany) D Pfizenmaier | 6^{5} | 6 | 6
(Switzerland) S Vögele | 7^{7} | 6
(Germany) J Görges | 6^{0} | 2
(Austria) P Mayr-Achleitner | 1 | 4
5 | (Ukraine) E Svitolina | 6 | 6

Second round
(United States) G Min | 6 | 6
Q | (United States) I Falconi | 3 | 3
Q | (Romania) A Bogdan | 2 | 5
8 | (Czech Republic) Ka Plíšková | 6 | 7
4 | (Germany) A Petkovic | 6 | 6
(Germany) D Pfizenmaier | 1 | 3
(Switzerland) S Vögele | 6 | 7
5 | (Ukraine) E Svitolina | 2 | 5

Quarterfinals
(United States) G Min | 6 | 6
8 | (Czech Republic) Ka Plíšková | 2 | 1
4 | (Germany) A Petkovic | 6 | 6
(Switzerland) S Vögele | 3 | 2

Semifinals
(United States) G Min | 6 | 2 | 4
4 | (Germany) A Petkovic | 4 | 6 | 6

=== Bottom half ===
First round
7 | (Italy) C Giorgi | 6 | 6
(Czech Republic) A Hlaváčková | 2 | 3
WC | (Austria) Y Neuwirth | 2 | 4
WC | (Austria) L-M Moser | 6 | 6
(Czech Republic) Kr Plíšková | 7^{10} | 5 | 4
Q | (United States) S Rogers | 6^{8} | 7 | 6
Q | (Germany) L Siegemund | 6^{3} | 6 | 4
3 | (Spain) C Suárez Navarro | 7^{7} | 1 | 6
6 | (Austria) Y Meusburger | 7^{11} | 4 | 7
Q | (Czech Republic) T Smitková | 6^{9} | 6 | 5
(Colombia) M Duque Mariño | 1 | 2
(South Africa) C Scheepers | 6 | 6
(Serbia) J Jakšić | 3 | 6 | 3
(Argentina) P Ormaechea | 6 | 4 | 6
Q | (Czech Republic) K Siniaková | 3 | 2
2 | (Italy) S Errani | 6 | 6

Second round
7 | (Italy) C Giorgi | 6 | 6
WC | (Austria) L-M Moser | 0 | 2
Q | (United States) S Rogers | 6 | 6
3 | (Spain) C Suárez Navarro | 4 | 0
6 | (Austria) Y Meusburger | 6 | 1 | 2
(South Africa) C Scheepers | 4 | 6 | 6
(Argentina) P Ormaechea | 3 | 0
2 | (Italy) S Errani | 6 | 6

Quarterfinals
7 | (Italy) C Giorgi | 1 | 5
Q | (United States) S Rogers | 6 | 7
(South Africa) C Scheepers | 6 | 1 | 3
2 | (Italy) S Errani | 2 | 6 | 6

Semifinals
Q | (United States) S Rogers | 7^{14} | 6
2 | (Italy) S Errani | 6^{12} | 3

== Qualifying ==
=== Seeds ===
1. (Ukraine) Maryna Zanevska (first round, retired)
2. (Czech Republic) Kateřina Siniaková (qualified)
3. (United States) Shelby Rogers (qualified)
4. (United States) Irina Falconi (qualified)
5. (Czech Republic) Tereza Smitková (qualified)
6. (Germany) Laura Siegemund (qualified)
7. (Spain) Beatriz García Vidagany (qualifying competition, lucky loser)
8. (Georgia (country)) Sofia Shapatava (first round)
9. (Uzbekistan) Nigina Abduraimova (qualifying competition)
10. (Canada) Gabriela Dabrowski (qualifying competition)
11. (Germany) Kristina Barrois (qualifying competition)
12. (Slovenia) Nastja Kolar (qualifying competition)

=== Qualifiers ===
1. (Romania) Ana Bogdan
2. (Czech Republic) Kateřina Siniaková
3. (United States) Shelby Rogers
4. (United States) Irina Falconi
5. (Czech Republic) Tereza Smitková
6. (Germany) Laura Siegemund

=== Lucky losers ===
1. (Spain) Beatriz García Vidagany

=== Draw ===
==== First qualifier ====
First round
1 | (Ukraine) Maryna Zanevska | 1 | 0^{r}
(Romania) Ana Bogdan | 6 | 0
(Czech Republic) Tereza Martincová | 6 | 6
8 | (Georgia (country)) Sofia Shapatava | 1 | 1

Qualifying competition
(Romania) Ana Bogdan | 6 | 7
(Czech Republic) Tereza Martincová | 3 | 5

==== Second qualifier ====
First round
2 | (Czech Republic) Kateřina Siniaková | 6 | 4 | 6
(Ukraine) Kateryna Bondarenko | 4 | 6 | 3
WC | (Austria) Barbara Haas | 2 | 1
12 | (Slovenia) Nastja Kolar | 6 | 6

Qualifying competition
2 | (Czech Republic) Kateřina Siniaková | 6 | 7^{7}
12 | (Slovenia) Nastja Kolar | 4 | 6^{3}

==== Third qualifier ====
First round
3 | (United States) Shelby Rogers | 6 | 2 | 6
(Russia) Marina Melnikova | 4 | 6 | 3
WC | (Austria) Lena Reichel | 6 | 1 | 4
7 | (Spain) Beatriz García Vidagany | 2 | 6 | 6

Qualifying competition
3 | (United States) Shelby Rogers | 6 | 7^{7}
7 | (Spain) Beatriz García Vidagany | 1 | 6^{1}

==== Fourth qualifier ====
First round
4 | (United States) Irina Falconi | 6 | 6
WC | (Austria) Janina Toljan | 1 | 2
(Czech Republic) Kateřina Kramperová | 2 | 3
11 | (Germany) Kristina Barrois | 6 | 6

Qualifying competition
4 | (United States) Irina Falconi | 2 | 7^{7} | 6
11 | (Germany) Kristina Barrois | 6 | 6^{3} | 1

==== Fifth qualifier ====
First round
5 | (Czech Republic) Tereza Smitková | 6 | 6
(Greece) Eleni Daniilidou | 2 | 3
(Russia) Ekaterina Alexandrova | 6 | 4 | 5
10 | (Canada) Gabriela Dabrowski | 4 | 6 | 7

Qualifying competition
5 | (Czech Republic) Tereza Smitková | 6 | 6
10 | (Canada) Gabriela Dabrowski | 2 | 0

==== Sixth qualifier ====
First round
6 | (Germany) Laura Siegemund | 6 | 6
(Ukraine) Sofiya Kovalets | 1 | 0
WC | (Austria) Julia Grabher | 2 | 2
9 | (Uzbekistan) Nigina Abduraimova | 6 | 6

Qualifying competition
6 | (Germany) Laura Siegemund | 6 | 6
9 | (Uzbekistan) Nigina Abduraimova | 3 | 1
