= 2011 Gastein Ladies – Singles qualifying =

This article displays the qualifying draw of the 2011 Gastein Ladies.

== Players ==
=== Seeds ===
1. (Czech Republic) Eva Birnerová (first round)
2. (United States) Ashley Weinhold (first round)
3. (Germany) Laura Siegemund (first round)
4. (Croatia) Ana Vrljić (first round)
5. (Hungary) Réka-Luca Jani (qualifying competition)
6. (Poland) Marta Domachowska (second round)
7. (Colombia) Catalina Castaño (first round)
8. (Argentina) Paula Ormaechea (qualified)

=== Qualifiers ===
1. (Slovenia) Nastja Kolar
2. (Georgia (country)) Sofia Shapatava
3. (Bulgaria) Dia Evtimova
4. (Argentina) Paula Ormaechea

== Qualifying draw ==
=== First qualifier ===
First round
1	(Czech Republic) Eva Birnerová	4	5
(Slovakia) Lenka Juríková	6	7
(Australia) Jessica Moore	6	3	6
(Ukraine) Nadiya Kichenok	3	6	1
(Belgium) Alison van Uytvanck	6	1	1
WC	(Austria) Lisa-Maria Moser	3	6	6
(Slovenia) Nastja Kolar	6	1	6
7	(Colombia) Catalina Castaño	3	6	2

Second round
(Slovakia) Lenka Juríková	6	6
(Australia) Jessica Moore	4	2
(Austria) Lisa-Maria Moser	1	4
(Slovenia) Nastja Kolar	6	6

Qualifying competition
(Slovakia) Lenka Juríková	2	1
(Slovenia) Nastja Kolar	6	6

=== Second qualifier ===
First round
2	(United States) Ashley Weinhold	4	6^{12}
(Georgia (country)) Sofia Shapatava	6	7
(Slovakia) Zuzana Luknárová	6	6
WC	(Austria) Janina Toljan	2	4
(Croatia) Silvia Njirić	6	3	3
(Austria) Nicole Rottmann	3	6	6
(Ukraine) Lyudmyla Kichenok	7	3	4
6	(Poland) Marta Domachowska	5	6	6

Second round
(Georgia (country)) Sofia Shapatava	6	6
(Slovakia) Zuzana Luknárová	0	2
(Austria) Nicole Rottmann	7^{8}	6
6	(Poland) Marta Domachowska	6^{6}	3

Qualifying competition
(Georgia (country)) Sofia Shapatava	4	6	6
(Austria) Nicole Rottmann	6	2	4

=== Third qualifier ===
First round
3	(Germany) Laura Siegemund	4	6	1
(Bulgaria) Dia Evtimova	6	1	6
WC	(Austria) Yvonne Neuwirth	6	1	3
(Slovakia) Michaela Pochabová	2	6	6
WC	(Austria) Anna Maria Heil	3	6	2
(Japan) Ryoko Fuda	6	4	6
(Australia) Daniella Dominikovic	5	2
5	(Hungary) Réka-Luca Jani	7	6

Second round
(Bulgaria) Dia Evtimova	6	6
(Slovakia) Michaela Pochabová	4	2
(Japan) Ryoko Fuda	5	6	2
5	(Hungary) Réka-Luca Jani	7	4	6

Qualifying competition
(Bulgaria) Dia Evtimova	6	6
5	(Hungary) Réka-Luca Jani	2	2

=== Fourth qualifier ===
First round
4	(Croatia) Ana Vrljić	6	3	1
(United States) Gail Brodsky	3	6	6
WC	(Austria) Pia Konig	6	1	6
(Russia) Olga Puchkova	4	6	2
(Slovakia) Michaela Hončová	6	7^{7}
(Slovenia) Dalila Jakupovič	1	6^{4}
(Serbia) Aleksandra Krunić
8	(Argentina) Paula Ormaechea	w/o

Second round
(United States) Gail Brodsky	6	7
WC	(Austria) Pia Konig	1	5
(Slovakia) Michaela Hončová	4	6^{3}
8	(Argentina) Paula Ormaechea	6	7^{7}

Qualifying competition
(United States) Gail Brodsky	3	4
8	(Argentina) Paula Ormaechea	6	6
