= 2014 Gastein Ladies – Doubles =

Doubles
- 2014 Gastein Ladies

Final
- Champions: (Czech Republic) Karolína Plíšková (Czech Republic) Kristýna Plíšková
- Runners-up: (Slovenia) Andreja Klepač (Spain) María Teresa Torró Flor
- Score: 4–6, 6–3, [10–6]

Details
- Draw: 16
- Seeds: 4

Events
Singles	Doubles
← 2013 ·	Gastein Ladies	· 2015 →

Sandra Klemenschits and Andreja Klepač were the defending champions, but decided not to participate together. Klemenschits teamed up with Mona Barthel, but lost in the quarterfinals to Paula Ormaechea and Dinah Pfizenmaier. Klepač teamed up with María Teresa Torró Flor, but they lost in the final to Karolína Plíšková and Kristýna Plíšková, 6–4, 3–6, [6–10].

== Seeds ==
1. (Germany) ~~Julia Görges~~ / (Italy) ~~Flavia Pennetta~~ (withdrew)
2. (Czech Republic) Karolína Plíšková / (Czech Republic) Kristýna Plíšková (champions)
3. (Canada) Gabriela Dabrowski / (Poland) Alicja Rosolska (first round)
4. (Germany) Kristina Barrois / (Greece) Eleni Daniilidou (semifinals)
5. (Slovenia) Andreja Klepač / (Spain) María Teresa Torró Flor (final)

== Draw ==
=== Key ===
- Q = Qualifier
- WC = Wild card
- LL = Lucky loser
- Alt = Alternate
- SE = Special exempt
- PR = Protected ranking
- ITF = ITF entry
- JE = Junior exempt
- w/o = Walkover
- r = Retired
- d = Defaulted
- SR = Special ranking

First round
5	(Slovenia) A Klepač (Spain) MT Torró Flor	2	6	[10]
(Czech Republic) A Hlaváčková (Ukraine) E Svitolina	6	4	[6]
(Netherlands) D Schuurs (Netherlands) E Wacanno	6^{5}	7^{7}	[7]
WC	(Austria) L-M Moser (Germany) L Siegemund	7^{7}	6^{2}	[10]
3	(Canada) G Dabrowski (Poland) A Rosolska	1	3
(Germany) M Barthel (Austria) S Klemenschits	6	6
(Czech Republic) B Krejčíková (Czech Republic) K Siniaková	4	7	[7]
Alt	(Argentina) P Ormaechea (Germany) D Pfizenmaier	6	5	[10]
(Ukraine) K Bondarenko (United States) N Melichar	3	6	[10]
(United States) I Falconi (Belarus) S Pirazhenka	6	4	[3]
(Russia) M Melnikova (Georgia (country)) S Shapatava	6	4	[7]
4	(Germany) K Barrois (Greece) E Daniilidou	4	6	[10]
(Ukraine) A Fomina (Germany) C Shakovets	2	6	[6]
(Colombia) M Duque (Spain) B García Vidagany	6	4	[10]
WC	(Austria) Y Neuwirth (Austria) J Toljan	2	0
2	(Czech Republic) Ka Plíšková (Czech Republic) Kr Plíšková	6	6

Quarterfinals
5	(Slovenia) A Klepač (Spain) MT Torró Flor	7	6^{4}	[10]
WC	(Austria) L-M Moser (Germany) L Siegemund	5	7^{7}	[7]
(Germany) M Barthel (Austria) S Klemenschits	4	2
Alt	(Argentina) P Ormaechea (Germany) D Pfizenmaier	6	6
(Ukraine) K Bondarenko (United States) N Melichar	6	2	[5]
4	(Germany) K Barrois (Greece) E Daniilidou	3	6	[10]
(Colombia) M Duque (Spain) B García Vidagany	6^{10}	6	[3]
2	(Czech Republic) Ka Plíšková (Czech Republic) Kr Plíšková	7^{12}	3	[10]

Semifinals
5	(Slovenia) A Klepač (Spain) MT Torró Flor	6	6
Alt	(Argentina) P Ormaechea (Germany) D Pfizenmaier	3	2
4	(Germany) K Barrois (Greece) E Daniilidou	3	4
2	(Czech Republic) Ka Plíšková (Czech Republic) Kr Plíšková	6	6

Final
5	(Slovenia) A Klepač (Spain) MT Torró Flor	6	3	[6]
2	(Czech Republic) Ka Plíšková (Czech Republic) Kr Plíšková	4	6	[10]
