= 2013 Gastein Ladies – Doubles =

Doubles
- 2013 Gastein Ladies

Final
- Champions: (Austria) Sandra Klemenschits (Slovenia) Andreja Klepač
- Runners-up: (Germany) Kristina Barrois (Greece) Eleni Daniilidou
- Score: 6–1, 6–4

Details
- Draw: 16
- Seeds: 4

Events
Singles	Doubles
← 2012 ·	Gastein Ladies	· 2014 →

Jill Craybas and Julia Görges were the defending champions but chose not to participate.
Sandra Klemenschits and Andreja Klepač won the title, defeating Kristina Barrois and Eleni Daniilidou in the final, 6–1, 6–4.

== Seeds ==
1. (Luxembourg) Mandy Minella / (South Africa) Chanelle Scheepers (quarterfinals)
2. (South Africa) Natalie Grandin / (Croatia) Petra Martić (first round)
3. (Romania) Raluca Olaru / (Russia) Valeria Solovyeva (quarterfinals)
4. (Czech Republic) Eva Hrdinová / (Israel) Shahar Pe'er (quarterfinals, retired)

== Draw ==
=== Key ===
- Q = Qualifier
- WC = Wild card
- LL = Lucky loser
- Alt = Alternate
- SE = Special exempt
- PR = Protected ranking
- ITF = ITF entry
- JE = Junior exempt
- w/o = Walkover
- r = Retired
- d = Defaulted
- SR = Special ranking

=== Draw ===
First round
1	(Luxembourg) M Minella (South Africa) C Scheepers	6	6
(Bulgaria) E Kostova (Bulgaria) I Shinikova	2	4
(Serbia) T Čurović (United States) C Scholl	6	6
(Slovakia) M Hončová (Switzerland) C Perrin	3	3
3	(Romania) R Olaru (Russia) V Solovyeva	6	5	[10]
WC	(Austria) L-M Moser (Austria) Y Neuwirth	3	7	[8]
(Austria) S Klemenschits (Slovenia) A Klepač	6	3	[10]
(Romania) E Bogdan (Bulgaria) A Naydenova	0	6	[1]
WC	(Germany) M Barthel (Germany) A Beck	3	6	[4]
(Germany) K Barrois (Greece) E Daniilidou	6	4	[10]
(Romania) I-C Begu (Ukraine) E Svitolina	7	5	[9]
4	(Czech Republic) E Hrdinová (Israel) S Pe'er	5	7	[11]
(Italy) N Clerico (Germany) A Zaja	1	6	[4]
(Spain) I Ferrer Suárez (Netherlands) A Rus	6	2	[10]
(Ukraine) V Kapshay (Serbia) T Mirčić	6	6
2	(South Africa) N Grandin (Croatia) P Martić	3	4

Quarterfinals
1	(Luxembourg) M Minella (South Africa) C Scheepers	2	6	[9]
(Serbia) T Čurović (United States) C Scholl	6	3	[11]
3	(Romania) R Olaru (Russia) V Solovyeva	2	3
(Austria) S Klemenschits (Slovenia) A Klepač	6	6
(Germany) K Barrois (Greece) E Daniilidou	6	0
4	(Czech Republic) E Hrdinová (Israel) S Pe'er	1	0^{r}
(Spain) I Ferrer Suárez (Netherlands) A Rus	2	3
(Ukraine) V Kapshay (Serbia) T Mirčić	6	6

Semifinals
(Serbia) T Čurović (United States) C Scholl	2	4
(Austria) S Klemenschits (Slovenia) A Klepač	6	6
(Germany) K Barrois (Greece) E Daniilidou	4	7	[10]
(Ukraine) V Kapshay (Serbia) T Mirčić	6	5	[5]

Final
(Austria) S Klemenschits (Slovenia) A Klepač	6	6
(Germany) K Barrois (Greece) E Daniilidou	1	4
