= 2013 Gastein Ladies =

- Date: 13–21 July
- Edition: 7th
- Category: WTA International
- Draw: 32S / 16D
- Prize money: $235,000
- Surface: Clay / outdoor
- Location: Bad Gastein, Austria

Champions

Singles
- (Austria) Yvonne Meusburger

Doubles
- (Austria) Sandra Klemenschits / (Slovenia) Andreja Klepač
- Gastein Ladies

2013 Gastein Ladies is the 2013 edition of the outdoor clay courts women's tennis tournament Gastein Ladies. It was the seventh edition of the tournament, which was part of the 2013 WTA Tour. It took place in Bad Gastein, Austria between 13 and 21 July 2013. Unseeded Yvonne Meusburger won the singles title.

== Finals ==
=== Singles ===
(Austria) Yvonne Meusburger defeated (Czech Republic) Andrea Hlaváčková, 7–5, 6–2

- It was Meusberger's only singles title of her career.

=== Doubles ===
(Austria) Sandra Klemenschits / (Slovenia) Andreja Klepač defeated (Germany) Kristina Barrois / (Greece) Eleni Daniilidou, 6–1, 6–4

== Singles main draw entrants ==
=== Seeds ===
Country	Player	Rank^{1}	Seed
GER	Mona Barthel	33	1
GER	Annika Beck	53	2
ROU	Irina-Camelia Begu	59	3
GER	Andrea Petkovic	62	4
NED	Kiki Bertens	67	5
RSA	Chanelle Scheepers	69	6
ESP	María Teresa Torró Flor	71	7
ITA	Karin Knapp	72	8

- ^{1} Rankings are as of July 8, 2013

=== Other entrants ===
The following players received wildcards into the singles main draw:

- (Austria) Patricia Mayr-Achleitner
- (Austria) Lisa-Maria Moser
- (Germany) Carina Witthöft

The following players received entry from the qualifying draw:

- (Romania) Elena Bogdan
- (Switzerland) Viktorija Golubic
- (Slovakia) Michaela Hončová
- (Bosnia and Herzegovina) Jasmina Tinjić

The following player received entry as lucky loser:

- (Bulgaria) Dia Evtimova

=== Withdrawals ===
Before the tournament

- (Slovakia) Jana Čepelová
- (France) Alizé Cornet
- (Hungary) Melinda Czink
- (Czech Republic) Lucie Hradecká
- (Croatia) Mirjana Lučić-Baroni (gastrointestinal illness)
- (Germany) Tatjana Maria
- (France) Kristina Mladenovic (fatigue)
- (Switzerland) Romina Oprandi (back injury)

=== Retirements ===
- (Germany) Mona Barthel (shoulder injury)

== Doubles main draw entrants ==
=== Seeds ===
Country	Player	Country	Player	Rank^{1}	Seed
LUX	Mandy Minella	RSA	Chanelle Scheepers	125	1
RSA	Natalie Grandin	CRO	Petra Martić	134	2
ROU	Raluca Olaru	RUS	Valeria Solovyeva	148	3
CZE	Eva Hrdinová	ISR	Shahar Pe'er	195	4

- ^{1} Rankings are as of July 8, 2013

=== Other entrants ===
The following pairs received wildcards into the doubles main draw:

- (Germany) Mona Barthel / (Germany) Annika Beck
- (Austria) Lisa-Maria Moser / (Austria) Yvonne Neuwirth

=== Retirements ===
- (Czech Republic) Eva Hrdinová (gastrointestinal illness)
