= Tamara Čurović =

Serbian tennis player (born 1994)

Tamara Čurović Тамара Чуровић
- Country (sports): Serbia
- Residence: Belgrade, Serbia
- Born: 31 October 1994 (age 31) Belgrade, FR Yugoslavia
- Height: 1.79 m (5 ft 10 in)
- Turned pro: 2009
- Retired: 2024
- Plays: Right (two-handed backhand)
- Prize money: $152,088

Singles
- Career record: 382–310
- Career titles: 8 ITF
- Highest ranking: No. 394 (27 May 2013)

Doubles
- Career record: 371–233
- Career titles: 34 ITF
- Highest ranking: No. 208 (19 May 2014)

Tamara Čurović (Serbian Cyrillic: Тамара Чуровић; born 31 October 1994) is a Serbian former professional tennis player.

Čurović was an official member of Serbia Fed Cup team in 2011, but she did not play any match.

She won eight singles titles and 34 doubles titles on the ITF Women's Circuit. On 27 May 2013, she reached her best singles ranking of world No. 394. On 19 May 2014, she peaked at No. 208 in the WTA doubles rankings.

Čurović made her WTA Tour main-draw debut in doubles at the 2013 Gastein Ladies, partnering Chiara Scholl. They defeated Michaela Hončová and Conny Perrin in the first round and top seeds Mandy Minella and Chanelle Scheepers in the quarterfinals, before losing to eventual champions, Sandra Klemenschits and Andreja Klepač. At the same tournament, Čurović lost in the first round of the singles qualifying. To date, her only other WTA Tour main-draw appearance in doubles was at the 2014 Bucharest Open, partnering with Elitsa Kostova and losing in the first round.

== Personal life ==
Tamara was born to Slavko Čurović and Svetlana Prudnikova, a former Russian chess champion. She has a brother, Vladislav. Čurović began playing tennis aged nine at a local tennis club, and is currently a member of the Partizan Tennis Club. She cites Maria Sharapova, Ana Ivanovic and Jelena Janković as her idols.

== ITF Circuit finals ==
=== Singles: 17 (8 titles, 9 runner-ups) ===
Legend $60,000 tournaments $25,000 tournaments $10/15,000 tournaments (8–9)	Finals by surface Hard (0–1) Clay (7–7) Carpet (1–1)

Result	W–L	Date	Tournament	Tier	Surface	Opponent	Score
Loss	0–1	Sep 2009	ITF Doboj, Bosnia & Herzegovina	10k	Clay	(Croatia) Matea Mezak	6–4, 2–6, 4–6
Win	1–1	Jun 2011	ITF Paros, Greece	10k	Carpet	(Ukraine) Yuliya Lysa	6–4, 6–1
Loss	1–2	Apr 2012	ITF Heraklion, Greece	10k	Carpet	(Croatia) Silvia Njirić	3–6, 4–6
Loss	1–3	Aug 2012	ITF Brčko, Bosnia & Herzegovina	10k	Hard	(Croatia) Jelena Pandžić	3–6, 1–4 ret.
Win	2–3	Sep 2013	ITF Belgrade, Serbia	10k	Clay	(Czech Republic) Tereza Malíková	6–4, 6–3
Loss	2–4	Jul 2017	ITF Prokuplje, Serbia	15k	Clay	(Romania) Oana Gavrilă	4–6, 3–6
Loss	2–5	Apr 2019	ITF Shymkent, Kazakhstan	W15	Clay	(Russia) Kamilla Rakhimova	2–6, 5–7
Loss	2–6	Sep 2019	ITF Shymkent, Kazakhstan	W15	Clay	(Russia) Elina Avanesyan	2–6, 5–7
Loss	2–7	Jan 2020	ITF Cairo, Egypt	W15	Clay	(Russia) Anastasia Zolotareva	6–4, 4–6, 0–6
Win	3–7	Jan 2021	ITF Antalya, Turkey	W15	Clay	(Italy) Aurora Zantedeschi	7–5, 7–6^{(4)}
Loss	3–8	Apr 2021	ITF Shymkent, Kazakhstan	W15	Clay	(United States) Jessie Aney	7–5, 6–7, 0–6
Win	4–8	Oct 2022	ITF Antalya, Turkey	W15	Clay	(Slovakia) Anika Jašková	6–2, 4–6, 6–3
Loss	4–9	Nov 2022	ITF Antalya, Turkey	W15	Clay	(Russia) Anastasia Zolotareva	6–2, 6–7^{(2)}, 4–6
Win	5–9	Nov 2022	ITF Antalya, Turkey	W15	Clay	(Belgium) Amelie Van Impe	6–3, 2–6, 6–4
Win	6–9	Feb 2023	ITF Jhajjar, India	W15	Clay	(India) Vaidehi Chaudhari	4–6, 6–2, 6–3
Win	7–9	Sep 2023	ITF Kuršumlijska Banja, Serbia	W15	Clay	(Serbia) Dunja Marić	2–6, 6–2, 6–4
Win	8–9	Oct 2023	ITF Bad Waltersdorf, Austria	W15	Clay	(Bulgaria) Julia Stamatova	6–4, 7–5

=== Doubles: 62 (34 titles, 28 runner-ups) ===
Legend $60,000 tournaments (0–1) $25,000 tournaments (2–5) $10/15,000 tournaments (32–22)	Finals by surface Hard (13–14) Clay (17–13) Carpet (4–1)

Result	W–L	Date	Tournament	Tier	Surface	Partner	Opponents	Score
Win	1–0	Jan 2011	ITF Tallinn, Estonia	10k	Hard	(Ukraine) Yevgeniya Kryvoruchko	(Estonia) Maret Ani (Estonia) Anett Kontaveit	7–6^{(8)}, 6–1
Win	2–0	May 2011	ITF Paros, Greece	10k	Carpet	(Ukraine) Yuliya Lysa	(Germany) Kim Grajdek (Ukraine) Anastasia Kharchenko	3–6, 6–0, [11–9]
Win	3–0	Jun 2011	ITF Paros, Greece	10k	Carpet	(Ukraine) Yuliya Lysa	(Australia) Anneliese Tepper (Australia) Bianca Tepper	6–4, 7–5
Loss	3–1	Jun 2011	ITF Astana, Kazakhstan	25k	Hard	(Uzbekistan) Sabina Sharipova	(Ukraine) Veronika Kapshay (Russia) Ekaterina Yashina	6–2, 3–6, [13–15]
Loss	3–2	Dec 2011	ITF Pune, India	10k	Hard	(Ukraine) Anna Shkudun	(China) Lu Jiajing (China) Lu Jiaxiang	7–6^{(6)}, 1–6, [5–10]
Loss	3–3	Nov 2012	ITF Heraklion, Greece	10k	Carpet	(Russia) Yana Sizikova	(Turkey) Başak Eraydın (Australia) Abbie Myers	4–6, 4–6
Loss	3–4	Mar 2013	ITF Sydney, Australia	10k	Hard	(China) Wang Yafan	(Japan) Misa Eguchi (Japan) Mari Tanaka	6–4, 5–7, [8–10]
Win	4–4	Apr 2013	ITF Heraklion, Greece	10k	Carpet	(Italy) Camilla Rosatello	(Spain) Olga Parres Azcoitia (Spain) Nuria Párrizas Díaz	7–6^{(4)}, 6–3
Win	5–4	May 2013	ITF Heraklion, Greece	10k	Carpet	(Netherlands) Valeria Podda	(Spain) Olga Parres Azcoitia (Mexico) Ximena Hermoso	6–3, 6–2
Loss	5–5	Jun 2013	ITF Cologne, Germany	10k	Clay	(Germany) Antonia Lottner	(Russia) Eugeniya Pashkova (Ukraine) Anastasiya Vasylyeva	3–6, 7–5, [6–10]
Loss	5–6	Sep 2013	ITF Belgrade, Serbia	10k	Clay	(Switzerland) Xenia Knoll	(North Macedonia) Lina Gjorcheska (Romania) Camelia Hristea	0–6, 1–6
Win	6–6	Mar 2014	ITF Lima, Peru	10k	Clay	(Russia) Yana Sizikova	(Argentina) Sofía Luini (Argentina) Aranza Salut	6–4, 7–5
Win	7–6	Mar 2014	ITF Lima, Peru	10k	Clay	(Russia) Yana Sizikova	(Argentina) Sofía Luini (Argentina) Aranza Salut	6–2, 7–6^{(2)}
Win	8–6	Apr 2014	ITF Lima, Peru	10k	Clay	(Russia) Yana Sizikova	(Argentina) Stephanie Petit (Argentina) Carolina Zeballos	6–0, 6–4
Loss	8–7	Sep 2014	ITF Tlemcen, Algeria	10k	Clay	(Hungary) Naomi Totka	(Serbia) Barbara Bonić (Russia) Margarita Lazareva	2–6, 2–6
Loss	8–8	Oct 2014	ITF Stockholm, Sweden	10k	Hard (i)	(Russia) Margarita Lazareva	(Sweden) Anette Munozova (France) Victoria Muntean	6–2, 4–6, [8–10]
Win	9–8	Nov 2014	ITF Stockholm, Sweden	10k	Hard (i)	(Russia) Margarita Lazareva	(Germany) Nora Niedmers (Germany) Caroline Uebelhoer	6–3, 7–6^{(3)}
Loss	9–9	Apr 2015	ITF Heraklion, Greece	10k	Hard	(Serbia) Barbara Bonić	(Greece) Valentini Grammatikopoulou (Russia) Anastasiya Komardina	2–6, 3–6
Loss	9–10	Apr 2015	ITF Heraklion, Greece	10k	Hard	(Greece) Despina Papamichail	(Greece) Valentini Grammatikopoulou (Russia) Anastasiya Komardina	2–6, 2–6
Loss	9–11	Apr 2015	ITF Heraklion, Greece	10k	Hard	(Belarus) Aryna Sabalenka	(India) Sharmada Balu (Chinese Taipei) Lee Pei-chi	6–4, 3–6, [2–10]
Win	10–11	Jul 2015	ITF Sakarya, Turkey	10k	Hard	(Russia) Ekaterina Yashina	(Turkey) Basak Eraydin (Russia) Margarita Lazareva	4–6, 6–1, [10–6]
Loss	10–12	Jun 2016	ITF Baku, Azerbaijan	10k	Hard	(Singapore) Stefanie Tan	(Russia) Kseniia Bekker (Russia) Alina Silich	3–6, 4–6
Loss	10–13	Jul 2016	ITF Niš, Serbia	10k	Clay	(Serbia) Natalija Kostić	(Russia) Amina Anshba (Russia) Angelina Gabueva	5–7, 5–7
Win	11–13	Jul 2016	ITF Prokuplje, Serbia	10k	Clay	(Slovakia) Barbara Kötelesová	(Australia) Masa Jovanovic (Australia) Angelique Svinos	5–7, 6–3, [10–8]
Win	12–13	Sep 2016	ITF Vrnjačka Banja, Serbia	10k	Clay	(Slovakia) Sandra Jamrichová	(Serbia) Kristina Ostojić (Bulgaria) Ani Vangelova	6–3, 6–2
Win	13–13	Oct 2016	ITF Hammamet, Tunisia	10k	Clay	(Slovakia) Barbara Kötelesová	(Czech Republic) Tereza Kolářová (Russia) Yulia Kulikova	3–6, 6–4, [10–3]
Loss	13–14	Nov 2016	ITF Hammamet, Tunisia	10k	Clay	(Slovakia) Barbara Kötelesová	(Argentina) Guadalupe Pérez Rojas (Switzerland) Jil Teichmann	1–6, 6–4, [9–11]
Win	14–14	Nov 2016	ITF Hammamet, Tunisia	10k	Clay	(Slovakia) Barbara Kötelesová	(Belgium) Déborah Kerfs (Poland) Patrycja Polańska	7–5, 3–6, [10–4]
Win	15–14	Nov 2016	ITF Hammamet, Tunisia	10k	Clay	(Belgium) Déborah Kerfs	(Brazil) Carolina Alves (Bolivia) Noelia Zeballos	7–6^{(5)}, 6–3
Win	16–14	Dec 2016	ITF Hammamet, Tunisia	10k	Clay	(Brazil) Carolina Alves	(Romania) Oana Gavrilă (Slovakia) Sandra Jamrichová	6–1, 3–6, [10–8]
Win	17–14	Dec 2016	ITF Hammamet, Tunisia	10k	Clay	(Brazil) Carolina Alves	(Romania) Oana Gavrilă (Slovakia) Sandra Jamrichová	6–3, 6–2
Win	18–14	Dec 2016	ITF Hammamet, Tunisia	10k	Clay	(Bosnia and Herzegovina) Jelena Simić	(France) Audrey Albié (France) Jade Suvrijn	w/o
Loss	18–15	Apr 2017	ITF Heraklion, Greece	15k	Clay	(Paraguay) Camila Giangreco Campiz	(Slovenia) Nastja Kolar (Bosnia and Herzegovina) Jasmina Tinjić	1–6, 1–6
Loss	18–16	May 2017	ITF Győr, Hungary	15k	Clay	(China) Wang Xinyu	(Austria) Mira Antonitsch (Hungary) Panna Udvardy	1–6, 2–6
Loss	18–17	Jun 2017	ITF Banja Luka, BiH	15k	Clay	(India) Riya Bhatia	(Turkey) Berfu Cengiz (Bulgaria) Ani Vangelova	5–7, 6–7^{(4)}
Win	19–17	Aug 2017	ITF Arad, Romania	15k	Clay	(Czech Republic) Vendula Žovincová	(Romania) Cristina Ene (Serbia) Bojana Marinković	6–1, 6–2
Win	20–17	Nov 2017	ITF Hammamet, Tunisia	15k	Clay	(Germany) Lisa Ponomar	(Italy) Anastasia Grymalska (Italy) Giorgia Marchetti	6–4, 7–6^{(7)}
Loss	20–18	Aug 2018	ITF El Espinar, Spain	25k	Hard	(Turkey) Başak Eraydın	(Spain) Marina Bassols Ribera (Spain) Olga Parres Azcoitia	5–7, 4–6
Loss	20–19	Sep 2018	ITF Székesfehérvár, Hungary	15k	Clay	(Serbia) Draginja Vuković	(Russia) Victoria Kan (Slovakia) Ingrid Vojčináková	5–7, 3–6
Win	21–19	Nov 2018	ITF Monastir, Tunisia	15k	Hard	(Belgium) Eliessa Vanlangendonck	(United States) Jessie Aney (United Kingdom) Olivia Sonnekus-Williams	6–0, 6–3
Loss	21–20	Nov 2018	ITF Monastir, Tunisia	15k	Hard	(Belgium) Eliessa Vanlangendonck	(Finland) Mia Eklund (Serbia) Bojana Marinković	1–6, 6–7^{(8)}
Win	22–20	Nov 2018	ITF Monastir, Tunisia	15k	Hard	(Netherlands) Dominique Karregat	(Finland) Mia Eklund (Sweden) Linnea Malmqvist	7–6^{(6)}, 6–1
Win	23–20	Dec 2018	ITF Monastir, Tunisia	15k	Hard	(Croatia) Silvia Njirić	(Switzerland) Nicole Gadient (United States) Chiara Scholl	7–6^{(2)}, 4–6, [10–6]
Win	24–20	Dec 2018	ITF Monastir, Tunisia	15k	Hard	(United States) Chiara Scholl	(United Kingdom) Ali Collins (Italy) Claudia Giovine	7–6^{(5)}, 6–4
Loss	24–21	Feb 2019	ITF Shymkent, Kazakhstan	W15	Hard (i)	(Estonia) Elena Malõgina	(Russia) Ekaterina Kazionova (Russia) Anastasia Zakharova	6–7^{(4)}, 1–6
Win	25–21	Apr 2019	ITF Shymkent, Kazakhstan	W15	Clay	(Russia) Anastasia Zakharova	(Kazakhstan) Dariya Detkovskaya (Kazakhstan) Zhibek Kulambayeva	7–5, 6–2
Win	26–21	Apr 2019	ITF Andijan, Uzbekistan	W25	Hard	(Hong Kong) Eudice Chong	(Russia) Amina Anshba (Czech Republic) Anastasia Dețiuc	6–2, 6–3
Loss	26–22	Jul 2019	ITF Stuttgart, Germany	W25	Clay	(United States) Chiara Scholl	(Russia) Alena Fomina (Slovakia) Vivien Juhászová	6–2, 2–6, [12–14]
Loss	26–23	Aug 2019	ITF Almaty, Kazakhstan	W25	Hard	(Russia) Alina Silich	(Kyrgyzstan) Ksenia Palkina (Georgia (country)) Sofia Shapatava	4–6, 6–7^{(3)}
Win	27–23	Nov 2019	ITF Monastir, Tunisia	W15	Hard	(France) Carole Monnet	(France) Manon Arcangioli (France) Alice Robbe	6–3, 6–4
Win	28–23	Dec 2019	ITF Monastir, Tunisia	W15	Hard	(Russia) Mariia Tkacheva	(Poland) Anna Hertel (Switzerland) Marie Mettraux	6–3, 0–6, [10–8]
Win	29–23	Jan 2020	ITF Cairo, Egypt	W15	Hard	(Serbia) Elena Milovanović	(Russia) Anna Morgina (Russia) Anastasia Zolotareva	6–2, 2–6, [10–2]
Win	30–23	Mar 2020	ITF Heraklion, Greece	W15	Hard	(Sweden) Fanny Östlund	(Romania) Ioana Gașpar (Spain) Rebeka Masarova	6–4, 7–5
Win	31–23	Jun 2021	ITF L'Aquila, Italy	W15	Clay	(Germany) Natalia Siedliska	(Czech Republic) Michaela Bayerlová (Germany) Emily Seibold	6–2, 6–3
Loss	31–24	Oct 2021	ITF Karaganda, Kazakhstan	W25	Hard (i)	(Estonia) Elena Malõgina	(Poland) Martyna Kubka (Kazakhstan) Zhibek Kulambayeva	5–7, 4–6
Win	32–24	Oct 2021	ITF Karaganda, Kazakhstan	W25	Hard (i)	(Russia) Ekaterina Reyngold	(Russia) Ekaterina Kazionova (Russia) Ekaterina Makarova	2–6, 6–3, [10–7]
Win	33–24	Mar 2022	ITF Gonesse, France	W15	Clay (i)	(France) Flavie Brugnone	(Germany) Julia Middendorf (Germany) Nicole Rivkin	6–2, 6–3
Loss	33–25	Aug 2022	Ladies Open Hechingen, Germany	W60	Clay	(United States) Chiara Scholl	(Russia) Irina Khromacheva (Russia) Diana Shnaider	2–6, 3–6
Loss	33–26	Oct 2022	ITF Antalya, Turkey	W15	Clay	(Serbia) Bojana Marinković	(Republic of Ireland) Celine Simunyu (Turkey) Melis Ayda Uyar	4–6, 6–3, [6–10]
Win	34–26	Nov 2022	ITF Antalya, Turkey	W15	Clay	(Japan) Mayuka Aikawa	(Russia) Ksenia Laskutova (Russia) Anna Ureke	6–3, 7–5
Loss	34–27	Oct 2023	ITF Bad Waltersdorf, Austria	W15	Clay	(Slovakia) Nikola Daubnerová	(Czech Republic) Denise Hrdinková (Slovakia) Laura Svatiková	6–7^{(5)}, 2–6
Loss	34–28	Oct 2023	ITF Monastir, Tunisia	W15	Hard	(Belgium) Amelia Waligora	(Germany) Alicia Melosch (Germany) Johanna Silva	w/o

== Other finals ==
Result	Year	Competition	Surface	Winners	Finalists	Score
Win	2009	Serbian National Tennis Championships	Clay	(Serbia) TK Partizan; Tamara Čurović; Bojana Jovanovski; Marija Mirkovic; Andrea Petkovic	(Serbia) TK Crvena Zvezda; Ana Jovanović; Carmen Klaschka; Aleksandra Ludvig; Ana Timotić	5–0

== Awards ==
- 2008 – Tennis Association of Serbia Award for Best Female Player U–14
- 2009 – Tennis Association of Serbia Award for Best Female Player U–16

== Personal Links ==
- Coaching
