= 2013 Fed Cup World Group II =

Part of tennis tournament

The World Group II was the second-highest level of Fed Cup competition in 2013. Four of the winners advanced to the World Group play-offs, and the losing nations resorted to the World Group II play-offs.

== Switzerland vs. Belgium ==
Switzerland
4
Sporthalle Wankdorf, Bern, Switzerland
9–10 February 2013
Hard (indoors)

Belgium
1

			1	2	3
1	(Switzerland) (Belgium)	Stefanie Vögele; Yanina Wickmayer	1; 6	6; 4	6; 8
2	(Switzerland) (Belgium)	Romina Oprandi; Kirsten Flipkens	6; 3	6; 3
3	(Switzerland) (Belgium)	Romina Oprandi; Yanina Wickmayer	6; 2	6; 2
4	(Switzerland) (Belgium)	Stefanie Vögele; Alison van Uytvanck	6; 2	7^{7} 6^{4}
5	(Switzerland) (Belgium)	Timea Bacsinszky / Amra Sadiković; Ysaline Bonaventure / Alison van Uytvanck	6; 4	6; 4

== Argentina vs. Sweden ==
Argentina
2
Estadio Mary Terán de Weiss, Buenos Aires, Argentina
9–10 February 2013
Red clay (outdoors)

Sweden
3

			1	2	3
1	(Argentina) (Sweden)	Paula Ormaechea; Johanna Larsson	6; 3	6; 0
2	(Argentina) (Sweden)	Florencia Molinero; Sofia Arvidsson	6; 3	2; 6	6; 1
3	(Argentina) (Sweden)	Paula Ormaechea; Sofia Arvidsson	5; 7	7^{8} 6^{6}	2; 3	retired
4	(Argentina) (Sweden)	Florencia Molinero; Johanna Larsson	3; 6	2; 6
5	(Argentina) (Sweden)	Mailen Auroux / María Irigoyen; Sofia Arvidsson / Johanna Larsson	4; 6	4; 6

== Spain vs. Ukraine ==
Spain
3
Club Atlético Montemar, Alicante, Spain
9–10 February 2013
Red clay (outdoors)

Ukraine
1

			1	2	3
1	(Spain) (Ukraine)	Lourdes Domínguez Lino; Elina Svitolina	5; 7	6; 2	8; 6
2	(Spain) (Ukraine)	Silvia Soler Espinosa; Lesia Tsurenko	7; 5	6; 4
3	(Spain) (Ukraine)	María Teresa Torró Flor; Yulia Beygelzimer	6; 4	6; 2
4	(Spain) (Ukraine)	Silvia Soler Espinosa; Elina Svitolina				not played
5	(Spain) (Ukraine)	Nuria Llagostera Vives / María Teresa Torró Flor; Yulia Beygelzimer / Olga Savchuk	3; 6	6; 2	[5] [10]

== France vs. Germany ==
France
1
Palais des Sports de Fetes, Limoges, France
9–10 February 2013
Red clay (indoors)

Germany
3

			1	2	3
1	(France) (Germany)	Pauline Parmentier; Sabine Lisicki	5; 7	5; 7
2	(France) (Germany)	Kristina Mladenovic; Julia Görges	3; 6	6^{5} 7^{7}
3	(France) (Germany)	Pauline Parmentier; Julia Görges	4; 6	2; 6
4	(France) (Germany)	Kristina Mladenovic; Sabine Lisicki				not played
5	(France) (Germany)	Alizé Cornet / Kristina Mladenovic; Annika Beck / Anna-Lena Grönefeld	6; 3	6; 4

== See also ==
- Fed Cup structure
