= WTA Austrian Open =

Generali Open

WTA 125
- Event name: Generali Open Ladies Kitzbühel
- Tour: WTA 125 (2026–)
- Founded: 1896; 130 years ago
- Editions: 1
- Location: Kitzbühel, Austria
- Venue: Tennis Stadium Kitzbühel
- Surface: Clay / outdoor
- Draw: 32S/8Q/8D
- Prize money: €100,000
- Website: generaliopen.com

Current champions (2026)
- Singles: (Austria) Sinja Kraus
- Doubles: (United Kingdom) Alicia Barnett (France) Elixane Lechemia

The Generali Open Ladies Kitzbühel is a WTA 125-level tennis tournament, held on outdoor clay courts. The event, founded in 1896, was cancelled in 2015, but returned in 2026. An ATP event is also held in Kitzbühel as the Generali Open Kitzbühel a week after the WTA event.

== History ==
The men's tournament the Championships of Austria was established in 1894, with the women's event following two years later in 1896, becoming a combined event. Following World War II it was known as the Austrian International Championships up to the Open Era. It was originally held in Prague in what was then (Bohemia) up until World War One; then in Vienna from 1921 to 1951, '54 '55 '57 '64, then moved to Salzburg in '1952, then held in Portschach in 1954 '58 '60 '63 '66 '68, it was held for year Linz in 1956, then in Kitzbühel in '59 '61 '65 .

In the Open Era, seven locations hosted the event: Pörtschach in 1968 and 1999; Kitzbühel from 1969 to 1983 and from 1990 to 1993; Vienna in 1979 and from 2001 to 2004; Bregenz from 1985 to 1986; Maria Lankowitz from 1994 to 1998, Klagenfurt in 2000 and Bad Gastein from 2007 to 2015 where it took place as Nürnberger Gastein Ladies. The tournament was not contested in 1984, 1987 to 1989 and from 2005 to 2006.

Four Austrians won the singles event: Judith Wiesner in 1995, Barbara Paulus in 1996, Barbara Schett in 1997 and 1999 and Yvonne Meusberger in 2013. Two Austrians were victorious in the doubles event: Petra Huber in 1986 partnering West German Petra Keppeler, Patricia Wartusch in 2002 partnering Hungarian Petra Mandula along with Sandra Klemenschits in 2013, partnering Slovenian Andreja Klepač. Romanian Virginia Ruzici holds the Open Era record for singles titles, with three victories in 1980, 1982 and 1985.

Nürnberger Gastein Ladies was a tennis tournament held in Bad Gastein, Austria between 2007 and 2015. It was an WTA International event on the WTA Tour with total prize-money of $250,000 and was played on red clay. In 2016, a new addition to the 2016 calendar was announced on March 11, the Ladies Championship Gstaad, Switzerland, which replaced the Nurnberger Gastein Ladies International tournament.

In 2020, amidst the COVID-19 pandemic, the WTA announced the Carinthian Ladies Open, a WTA 125K tournament, to be held in Austria on clay courts. The tournament was scheduled to be held during the same week as the 2020 US Open to allow players affected by the cancellation of US Open qualifying to compete. However, the tournament was cancelled just days after the announcement due to the pandemic.

== Finals ==
=== Singles ===
(incomplete list)

Year	Location	Champion	Finalist(s)	Score
1968	Pörtschach	(United Kingdom) Winnie Shaw	(Mexico) Elena Subirats	6–1, 7–5
1969	Kitzbühel	(Australia) Judy Tegart	(South Africa) Pat Walkden	8–6, 6–2
1970	Kitzbühel	(West Germany) Helga Niessen	(Australia) Evonne Goolagong	7–5, 6–3
1971	Kitzbühel	(United States) Billie Jean King	(South Africa) Laura Rossouw	6–2, 4–6, 7–5
1972	Kitzbühel	(West Germany) Katja Ebbinghaus	(Netherlands) Marijke Schaar	7–5, 6–3
1973	Kitzbühel		(Australia) Evonne Goolagong (Soviet Union) Olga Morozova	not completed
1974	Kitzbühel	(Czechoslovakia) Mirka Koželuhová	(Socialist Federal Republic of Yugoslavia) Mima Jaušovec	6–3, 6–0
1975	Kitzbühel	(United Kingdom) Sue Barker	(United States) Pam Teeguarden	6–4, 6–4
1976	Kitzbühel	(Australia) Wendy Turnbull	(Romania) Virginia Ruzici	6–4, 5–7, 6–2
1977	Kitzbühel	(Czechoslovakia) Renáta Tomanová	(West Germany) Katja Ebbinghaus	6–3, 7–5
1978	Kitzbühel	(Romania) Virginia Ruzici	(West Germany) Sylvia Hanika	6–4, 6–3
1979	Vienna	(United States) Chris Evert	(United States) Caroline Stoll	6–1, 6–1
1979	Kitzbühel	(Czechoslovakia) Hana Mandlíková	(West Germany) Sylvia Hanika	2–6, 7–5, 6–3
1980	Kitzbühel	(Romania) Virginia Ruzici	(Czechoslovakia) Hana Mandlíková	3–6, 6–1, ret.
1981	Kitzbühel	(West Germany) Claudia Kohde-Kilsch	(West Germany) Sylvia Hanika	7–5, 7–6
1982	Kitzbühel	(Romania) Virginia Ruzici	(Czechoslovakia) Lea Plchová	6–2, 6–2
1983	Kitzbühel	(France) Pascale Paradis	(Austria) Petra Huber	3–6, 6–3, 6–2
1984	Kitzbühel	(Czech Republic) Helena Suková	(Romania) Virginia Ruzici	6–2, 6–2
1985	Bregenz	(Romania) Virginia Ruzici	(Socialist Federal Republic of Yugoslavia) Mima Jaušovec	6–2, 6–3
1986	Bregenz	(Italy) Sandra Cecchini	(Argentina) Mariana Pérez-Roldán	6–4, 6–0
1987	not held			
1988	not held			
1989	not held			
1990	Kitzbühel	(West Germany) Claudia Kohde-Kilsch	(Australia) Rachel McQuillan	7–6, 6–4
1991	Kitzbühel	(Spain) Conchita Martínez	(Austria) Judith Wiesner	6–1, 2–6, 6–3
1992	Kitzbühel	(Spain) Conchita Martínez	(Switzerland) Manuela Maleeva-Fragnière	6–0, 3–6, 6–2
1993	Kitzbühel	(Germany) Anke Huber	(Austria) Judith Wiesner	6–4, 6–1
1994	Maria Lankowitz	(Germany) Anke Huber	(Austria) Judith Wiesner	6–3, 6–3
1995	Maria Lankowitz	(Austria) Judith Wiesner	(Romania) Ruxandra Dragomir	7–6, 6–3
1996	Maria Lankowitz	(Austria) Barbara Paulus	(Italy) Sandra Cecchini	w/o
1997	Maria Lankowitz	(Austria) Barbara Schett	(Slovakia) Henrieta Nagyová	3–6, 6–2, 6–3
1998	Maria Lankowitz	(Switzerland) Patty Schnyder	(Spain) Gala León García	6–2, 4–6, 6–3
1999	Pörtschach	(Slovakia) Karina Habšudová	(Croatia) Silvija Talaja	2–6, 6–4, 6–4
2000	Klagenfurt	(Austria) Barbara Schett	(Switzerland) Patty Schnyder	5–7, 6–4, 6–4
2001	Vienna	(Uzbekistan) Iroda Tulyaganova	(Switzerland) Patty Schnyder	6–3, 6–2
2002	Vienna	(Israel) Anna Smashnova	(Uzbekistan) Iroda Tulyaganova	6–4, 6–1
2003	Vienna	(Argentina) Paola Suárez	(Croatia) Karolina Šprem	7–6, 2–6, 6–4
2004	Vienna	(Israel) Anna Smashnova	(Australia) Alicia Molik	6–2, 3–6, 6–2
2005	not held			
2006	not held			
2007	Bad Gastein	(Italy) Francesca Schiavone	(Austria) Yvonne Meusburger	6–1, 6–4
2008	Bad Gastein	(France) Pauline Parmentier	(Czech Republic) Lucie Hradecká	6–4, 6–4
2009	Bad Gastein	(Germany) Andrea Petkovic	(Romania) Ioana Raluca Olaru	6–2, 6–3
2010	Bad Gastein	(Germany) Julia Görges	(Switzerland) Timea Bacsinszky	6–1, 6–4
2011	Bad Gastein	(Spain) María José Martínez Sánchez	(Austria) Patricia Mayr-Achleitner	6–0, 7–5
2012	Bad Gastein	(France) Alizé Cornet	(Belgium) Yanina Wickmayer	7–5, 7–6^{(7–1)}
2013	Bad Gastein	(Austria) Yvonne Meusburger	(Czech Republic) Andrea Hlaváčková	7–5, 6–2
2014	Bad Gastein	(Germany) Andrea Petkovic (2)	(United States) Shelby Rogers	6–3, 6–3
2015	Bad Gastein	(Australia) Samantha Stosur	(Italy) Karin Knapp	3–6, 7–6^{(7–3)}, 6–2
2016–2025	Not held			
↓ WTA 125 tournament ↓
2026	Kitzbühel	(Austria) Sinja Kraus	(Austria) Julia Grabher	6–3, 6–1

=== Doubles ===
Year	Location	Champions	Runners-up	Score
1968	Pörtschach			unavailable
1969	Kitzbühel	(Australia) Judy Tegart (South Africa) Pat Walkden	(South Africa) Marianna Brummer (South Africa) Anita van Deventer	6–0, 6–3
1970	Kitzbühel	(South Africa) Brenda Kirk (South Africa) Annette Van Zyl	(West Germany) Helga Niessen (United Kingdom) Winnie Shaw	6–4, 6–3
1971	Kitzbühel	(United States) Rosemary Casals (United States) Billie Jean King	(West Germany) Helga Niessen (West Germany) Heide Orth	6–2, 6–4
1972	Kitzbühel	(West Germany) Katja Ebbinghaus (West Germany) Heide Orth	(Australia) Mandy Morgan (Uruguay) Lucia Sarno	6–0, 6–1
1973	Kitzbühel	(Soviet Union) Aleksandra Ivanova (Soviet Union) Olga Morozova	(Australia) Evonne Goolagong (Australia) Janet Young	2–6, 6–4, 6–2
1974	Kitzbühel	(Hungary) Beatrix Klein (Hungary) Éva Szabó	(Chile) Ana María Pinto Bravo (West Germany) Iris Riedel	6–1, 6–4
1975	Kitzbühel	(United Kingdom) Sue Barker (United States) Pam Teeguarden	(Peru) Fiorella Bonicelli (Argentina) Raquel Giscafré	6–4, 6–3
1976	Kitzbühel	(Sweden) Helena Anliot (Sweden) Mimmi Wikstedt	(West Germany) Katja Ebbinghaus (West Germany) Heidi Eisterlehner	6–4, 2–6, 7–5
1977	Kitzbühel	(Australia) Helen Gourlay-Cawley (United States) Rayni Fox	(United Kingdom) Lesley Charles (United Kingdom) Jackie Fayter	6–1, 6–4
1978	Kitzbühel	(Romania) Virginia Ruzici (Czechoslovakia) Renáta Tomanová	(Czechoslovakia) Regina Maršíková (Romania) Florența Mihai	7–5, 6–2
1979	Vienna	(Australia) Dianne Fromholtz (South Africa) Marise Kruger	(South Africa) Ilana Kloss (United States) Betty-Ann Stuart	3–6, 6–4, 6–1
1979	Kitzbühel	(Sweden) Helena Anliot (Australia) Dianne Evers	(Romania) Virginia Ruzici (Netherlands) Elly Vessies	6–0, 6–4
1980	Kitzbühel	(West Germany) Claudia Kohde-Kilsch (West Germany) Eva Pfaff	(Czechoslovakia) Renáta Tomanová (Czechoslovakia) Hana Mandlíková	w/o
1981	Kitzbühel	(West Germany) Claudia Kohde-Kilsch (West Germany) Eva Pfaff	(Australia) Elizabeth Little (South Africa) Yvonne Vermaak	6–4, 6–3
1982	Kitzbühel	(Czechoslovakia) Yvona Brzáková (Czechoslovakia) Kateřina Skronská	(United States) Jill Patterson (United States) Courtney Lord	6–1, 7–5
1983	Kitzbühel	(New Zealand) Chris Newton (Australia) Pam Whytcross	(France) Nathalie Herreman (France) Pascale Paradis	2–6, 6–4, 7–6
1984	not held			
1985	Bregenz	(Socialist Federal Republic of Yugoslavia) Mima Jaušovec (Romania) Virginia Ruzici	(Czechoslovakia) Andrea Holíková (Czechoslovakia) Kateřina Skronská	6–2, 6–3
1986	Bregenz	(Austria) Petra Huber (West Germany) Petra Keppeler	(Socialist Federal Republic of Yugoslavia) Sabrina Goleš (Denmark) Tine Scheuer-Larsen	6–2, 6–4
1987	not held			
1988	not held			
1989	not held			
1990	Kitzbühel	(Czechoslovakia) Petra Langrová (Czechoslovakia) Radka Zrubáková	(Italy) Sandra Cecchini (Argentina) Patricia Tarabini	6–0, 6–4
1991	Kitzbühel	(Argentina) Bettina Fulco (Netherlands) Nicole Muns-Jagerman	(Italy) Sandra Cecchini (Argentina) Patricia Tarabini	7–5, 6–4
1992	Kitzbühel	(Argentina) Florencia Labat (France) Alexia Dechaume-Balleret	(South Africa) Amanda Coetzer (Germany) Wiltrud Probst	6–3, 6–3
1993	Kitzbühel	(China) Fang Li (Belgium) Dominique Monami	(Croatia) Maja Murić (Czech Republic) Pavlína Rajzlová	6–2, 6–1
1994	Maria Lankowitz	(Italy) Sandra Cecchini (Argentina) Patricia Tarabini	(France) Alexandra Fusai (Slovakia) Karina Habšudová	7–5, 7–5
1995	Maria Lankowitz	(Italy) Silvia Farina (Hungary) Andrea Temesvári	(France) Alexandra Fusai (Germany) Wiltrud Probst	6–2, 6–2
1996	Maria Lankowitz	(Slovakia) Janette Husárová (Ukraine) Natalia Medvedeva	(Czech Republic) Lenka Cenková (Czech Republic) Kateřina Šišková	6–4, 7–5
1997	Maria Lankowitz	(Czech Republic) Eva Melicharová (Czech Republic) Helena Vildová	(Czech Republic) Radka Bobková (Germany) Wiltrud Probst	6–2, 6–2
1998	Maria Lankowitz	(Argentina) Laura Montalvo (Argentina) Paola Suárez	(Slovenia) Tina Križan (Slovenia) Katarina Srebotnik	6–1, 6–2
1999	Pörtschach	(Italy) Silvia Farina Elia (Slovakia) Karina Habšudová	(Ukraine) Olga Lugina (Argentina) Laura Montalvo	6–4, 6–4
2000	Klagenfurt	(Argentina) Laura Montalvo (Argentina) Paola Suárez	(Austria) Barbara Schett (Switzerland) Patty Schnyder	7–6, 6–1
2001	Vienna	(Argentina) Paola Suárez (Argentina) Patricia Tarabini	(Germany) Vanessa Henke (Czech Republic) Lenka Němečková	6–4, 6–2
2002	Vienna	(Hungary) Petra Mandula (Austria) Patricia Wartusch	(Austria) Barbara Schwartz (Germany) Jasmin Wöhr	6–2, 6–4
2003	Vienna	(China) Ting Li (China) Tiantian Sun	(China) Yan Zi (China) Zheng Jie	6–3, 6–4
2004	Vienna	(United States) Martina Navratilova (United States) Lisa Raymond	(Zimbabwe) Cara Black (Australia) Rennae Stubbs	6–2, 7–5
2005	not held			
2006	not held			
2007	Bad Gastein	(Czech Republic) Lucie Hradecká (Czech Republic) Renata Voráčová	(Hungary) Ágnes Szávay (Czech Republic) Vladimíra Uhlířová	6–3, 7–5
2008	Bad Gastein	(Czech Republic) Andrea Hlaváčková (Czech Republic) Lucie Hradecká	(Bulgaria) Sesil Karatantcheva (Serbia) Nataša Zorić	6–3, 6–3
2009	Bad Gastein	(Czech Republic) Andrea Hlaváčková (Czech Republic) Lucie Hradecká	(Germany) Tatjana Malek (Germany) Andrea Petkovic	6–2, 6–4
2010	Bad Gastein	(Czech Republic) Lucie Hradecká (Spain) Anabel Medina Garrigues	(Switzerland) Timea Bacsinszky (Italy) Tathiana Garbin	6–7^{(2–7)}, 6–1, [10–5]
2011	Bad Gastein	(Czech Republic) Eva Birnerová (Czech Republic) Lucie Hradecká	(Australia) Jarmila Gajdošová (Germany) Julia Görges	4–6, 6–2, [12–10]
2012	Bad Gastein	(United States) Jill Craybas (Germany) Julia Görges	(Germany) Anna-Lena Grönefeld (Croatia) Petra Martić	6–7^{(4–7)}, 6–4, [11–9]
2013	Bad Gastein	(Austria) Sandra Klemenschits (Slovenia) Andreja Klepač	(Germany) Kristina Barrois (Greece) Eleni Daniilidou	6–1, 6–4
2014	Bad Gastein	(Czech Republic) Karolína Plíšková (Czech Republic) Kristýna Plíšková	(Slovenia) Andreja Klepač (Spain) María Teresa Torró Flor	4–6, 6–3, [10–6]
2015	Bad Gastein	(Montenegro) Danka Kovinić (Liechtenstein) Stephanie Vogt	(Spain) Lara Arruabarrena (Czech Republic) Lucie Hradecká	4–6, 6–4, [10–3]
2016–2025	Not held			
↓ WTA 125 tournament ↓
2026	Kitzbühel	(United Kingdom) Alicia Barnett (France) Elixane Lechemia	(Spain) Yvonne Cavallé Reimers (Brazil) Laura Pigossi	6–4, 6–3

== See also ==
- List of tennis tournaments
- Linz Open
