= Pia König =

Austrian tennis player

- Country (sports): Austria
- Born: 14 May 1993 (age 31); Klosterneuburg
- Plays: Right (two-handed backhand)
- Prize money: $78,769

Singles
- Career record: 227–189
- Career titles: 3 ITF
- Highest ranking: No. 306 (21 September 2015)

Doubles
- Career record: 133–122
- Career titles: 12 ITF
- Highest ranking: No. 316 (27 February 2017)

Pia König (German pronunciation: [ˈpiːa ˈkøːnɪç]; born 14 May 1993) is an Austrian former professional tennis player.

König has a career-high WTA singles ranking of 306, achieved on 21 September 2015 and a career-high doubles ranking of world No. 316, reached on 27 February 2017. In her career, she won three singles and 12 doubles titles in tournaments of the ITF Circuit.

Since 2017, König has represented Austria in the Fed Cup with a win–loss record of 0–3.

== ITF Circuit finals ==
Legend
$25,000 tournaments
$15,000 tournaments
$10,000 tournaments

=== Singles: 9 (3 titles, 6 runner-ups) ===
| Result | Date | Tournament | Surface | Opponent | Score |
|---|---|---|---|---|---|
| Loss | Jun 2013 | ITF Sharm El Sheikh, Egypt | Hard | (Sweden) Susanne Celik | 4–6, 0–6 |
| Loss | Nov 2013 | ITF Fez, Morocco | Clay | (France) Jade Suvrijn | 4–6, 6–4, 0–6 |
| Win | Aug 2014 | ITF Pörtschach, Austria | Clay | (Austria) Barbara Haas | 6–3, 4–6, 7–5 |
| Loss | Nov 2014 | ITF Casablanca, Morocco | Clay | (Italy) Corinna Dentoni | 2–6, 5–7 |
| Win | Dec 2014 | ITF Antalya, Turkey | Clay | (North Macedonia) Lina Gjorcheska | 7–5, 6–4 |
| Loss | Jan 2015 | ITF Sharm El Sheikh, Egypt | Hard | (Bulgaria) Aleksandrina Naydenova | 3–6, 4–6 |
| Loss | Mar 2015 | ITF Clare, Australia | Hard | (South Korea) Jang Su-jeong | 3–6, 3–6 |
| Win | Sep 2015 | ITF Sankt Pölten, Austria | Clay | (Czech Republic) Diana Šumová | 6–0, 3–6, 7–5 |
| Loss | Mar 2017 | ITF Antalya, Turkey | Clay | (Romania) Georgia Andreea Crăciun | 3–6, 2–6 |

=== Doubles: 26 (12 titles, 14 runner-ups) ===
| Result | Date | Tournament | Surface | Partner | Opponents | Score |
|---|---|---|---|---|---|---|
| Loss | 29 July 2011 | ITF Bad Waltersdorf, Austria | Clay | (Austria) Yvonne Neuwirth | (Bosnia and Herzegovina) Sandra Martinović (Czech Republic) Kateřina Vaňková | 3–6, 6–3, [8–10] |
| Loss | 27 August 2011 | ITF Pörtschach, Austria | Clay | (Austria) Yvonne Neuwirth | (Russia) Victoria Kan (Belarus) Ilona Kremen | 1–6, 3–6 |
| Win | 3 May 2013 | ITF Ashkelon, Israel | Hard | (Israel) Ester Masuri | (United Kingdom) Laura Deigman (Israel) Keren Shlomo | 1–0 ret. |
| Loss | 21 September 2013 | ITF Pula, Italy | Clay | (Poland) Agata Barańska | (Netherlands) Quirine Lemoine (Netherlands) Gabriela van de Graaf | 4–6, 7–6^{(10)}, [3–10] |
| Win | 20 October 2013 | ITF Antalya, Turkey | Clay | (Poland) Barbara Sobaszkiewicz | (Belarus) Sviatlana Pirazhenka (Germany) Julia Wachaczyk | 6–1, 6–4 |
| Loss | 2 November 2013 | ITF Antalya, Turkey | Clay | (Georgia (country)) Ekaterine Gorgodze | (Romania) Diana Buzean (Romania) Raluca Elena Platon | 6–3, 3–6, [5–10] |
| Loss | 25 November 2013 | ITF Fez, Morocco | Clay | (Austria) Anna Maria Heil | (Australia) Alexandra Nancarrow (Spain) Olga Parres Azcoitia | 4–6, 4–6 |
| Win | 22 February 2014 | ITF Antalya, Turkey | Clay | (Georgia (country)) Sofia Kvatsabaia | (China) Li Yihong (China) Yang Zhaoxuan | 2–1 ret. |
| Loss | 19 April 2014 | ITF Sharm El Sheikh, Egypt | Hard | (China) Dong Xiaorong | (United Kingdom) Katy Dunne (Russia) Anna Morgina | 5–7, 6–7^{(5)} |
| Loss | 3 May 2014 | ITF Sharm El Sheikh, Egypt | Hard | (China) Dong Xiaorong | (United Kingdom) Katie Boulter (Serbia) Nina Stojanović | 4–6, 2–6 |
| Win | 30 May 2014 | ITF Netanya, Israel | Hard | (Czech Republic) Barbora Štefková | (Georgia (country)) Mariam Bolkvadze (Russia) Anastasia Pribylova | 6–3, 6–2 |
| Win | 25 July 2014 | ITF Bad Waltersdorf, Austria | Clay | (Slovenia) Polona Reberšak | (Czech Republic) Kristýna Hrabalová (Czech Republic) Tereza Janatová | 6–7^{(4)}, 7–5, [14–12] |
| Win | 26 September 2014 | ITF Algiers, Algeria | Clay | (Switzerland) Conny Perrin | (Serbia) Natalija Kostić (Russia) Margarita Lazareva | 6–3, 6–1 |
| Win | 17 January 2015 | ITF Sharm El Sheikh, Egypt | Hard | (Netherlands) Eva Wacanno | (Italy) Camilla Rosatello (Japan) Yuuki Tanaka | 4–6, 7–6^{(2)}, [10–5] |
| Loss | 28 June 2015 | ITF Breda, Netherlands | Clay | (Austria) Barbara Haas | (Belarus) Sviatlana Pirazhenka (Ukraine) Alyona Sotnikova | 3–6, 1–6 |
| Loss | 22 August 2015 | ITF Leipzig, Germany | Clay | (Switzerland) Conny Perrin | (Australia) Priscilla Hon (Switzerland) Jil Teichmann | 1–6, 4–6 |
| Win | 3 September 2015 | ITF Sankt Pölten, Austria | Clay | (Slovakia) Rebecca Šramková | (Germany) Nora Niedmers (United States) Tina Tehrani | 6–2, 6–2 |
| Win | 22 April 2016 | ITF Pula, Italy | Clay | (Ukraine) Sofiya Kovalets | (France) Vinciane Remy (France) Marie Témin | 6–3, 3–6, [10–8] |
| Win | 29 April 2016 | ITF Pula, Italy | Clay | (United Kingdom) Lisa Whybourn | (Italy) Marcella Cucca (Italy) Camilla Scala | 1–6, 7–5, [11–9] |
| Loss | 24 June 2016 | ITF Ystad, Sweden | Clay | (Bulgaria) Dia Evtimova | (Sweden) Cornelia Lister (Serbia) Nina Stojanović | 4–6, 2–6 |
| Loss | 14 August 2016 | Ladies Open Hechingen, Germany | Clay | (Germany) Vivian Heisen | (Germany) Nicola Geuer (Germany) Anna Zaja | 3–6, 1–6 |
| Win | 8 October 2016 | ITF Hammamet, Tunisia | Clay | (France) Alice Bacquié | (Chile) Fernanda Brito (Bolivia) Noelia Zeballos | 6–4, 6–1 |
| Loss | 3 February 2017 | ITF Almaty, Kazakhstan | Hard (i) | (Philippines) Katharina Lehnert | (Russia) Olga Doroshina (Russia) Polina Monova | 1–6, 2–6 |
| Win | 17 November 2017 | ITF Agadir, Morocco | Clay | (Italy) Miriana Tona | (Croatia) Mariana Dražić (Romania) Oana Georgeta Simion | 4–6, 7–6^{(5)}, [10–8] |
| Loss | 2 December 2017 | ITF Antalya, Turkey | Clay | (Russia) Alina Silich | (Japan) Chihiro Muramatsu (Turkey) Melis Sezer | 1–6, 4–6 |
| Loss | 30 March 2018 | ACT Clay Court International, Australia | Clay | (Japan) Michika Ozeki | (Romania) Irina Fetecău (Australia) Kaylah McPhee | 1–6, 6–4, [5–10] |
