= Andreja Klepač =

Slovenian tennis player

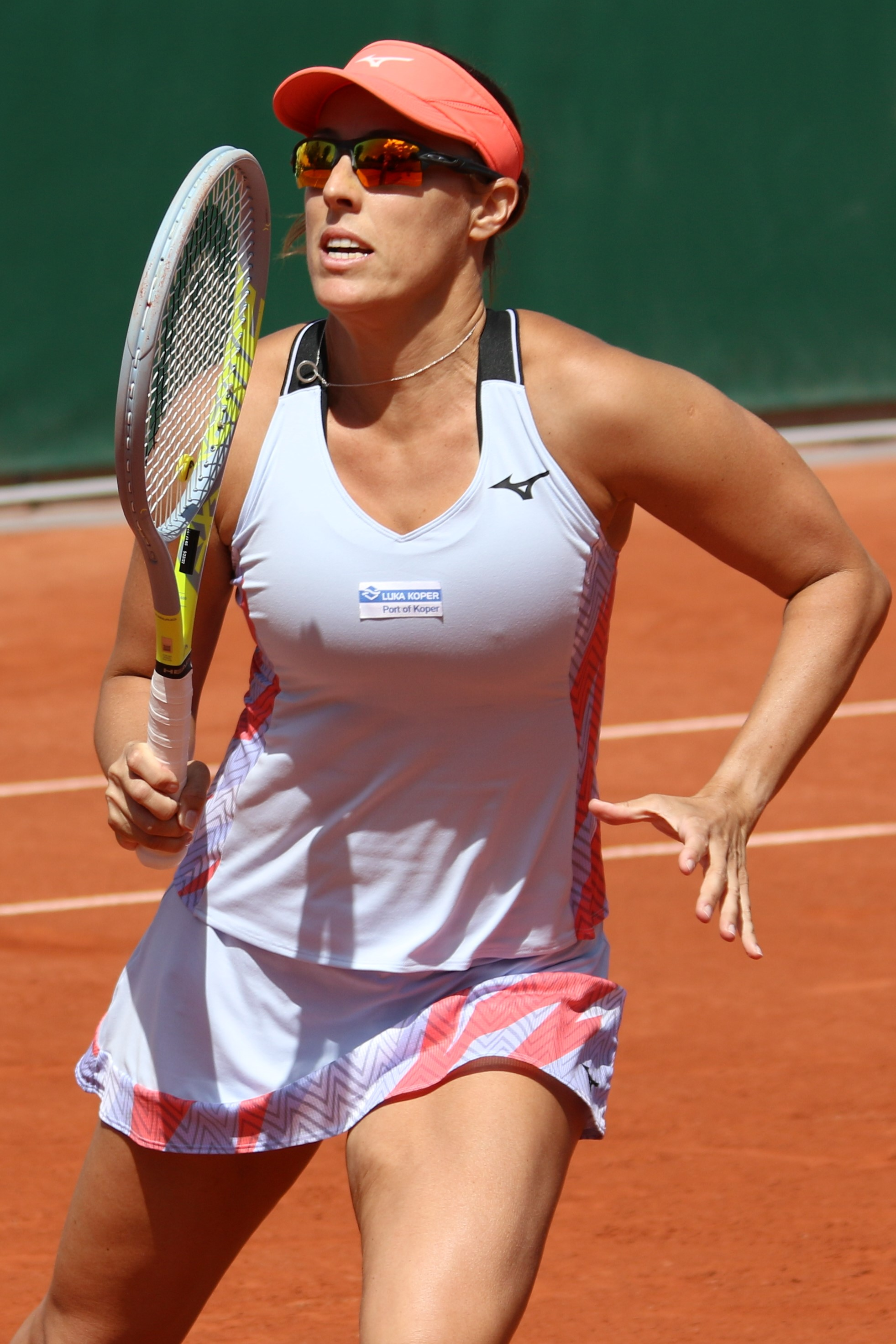
- Klepač at the 2022 French Open
- Country (sports): Slovenia
- Born: 13 March 1986 (age 40) Koper, SR Slovenia, SFR Yugoslavia
- Height: 1.75 m (5 ft 9 in)
- Turned pro: 2004
- Plays: Right (two-handed backhand)
- Prize money: $2,613,240

Singles
- Career record: 217–232
- Career titles: 3 ITF
- Highest ranking: No. 99 (14 July 2008)

Grand Slam singles results
- Australian Open: 1R (2007)
- French Open: Q2 (2007)
- Wimbledon: Q3 (2007)
- US Open: 1R (2007, 2008)

Doubles
- Career record: 423–370
- Career titles: 11 WTA, 14 ITF
- Highest ranking: No. 11 (11 April 2022)
- Current ranking: No. 89 (20 July 2026)

Grand Slam doubles results
- Australian Open: QF (2015, 2019)
- French Open: QF (2018, 2021, 2026)
- Wimbledon: QF (2022)
- US Open: QF (2015, 2016, 2017)

Other doubles tournaments
- Tour Finals: RR (2021)

Grand Slam mixed doubles results
- Australian Open: SF (2016)
- French Open: QF (2017)
- Wimbledon: QF (2016, 2021)
- US Open: 2R (2021)

Team competitions
- Fed Cup: 14–24
- Last updated on: 22 July 2026.

Andreja Klepač (born 13 March 1986) is a Slovenian tennis player. On 14 July 2008, she reached her career-high singles rankings of world No. 99. On 11 April 2022, she peaked at No. 11 in the WTA doubles rankings. She qualified also with Darija Jurak for the 2021 WTA Finals, after nearly 20 years on the professional tour.

== Career ==
Klepač has made one WTA Tour singles final in Budapest in 2008. She won eleven WTA Tour doubles titles and appeared in twelve other finals.

In July 2013, she won her first WTA Tour doubles title in Bad Gastein with Sandra Klemenschits.

In 2015, Klepač reached quarterfinals at the Australian Open with Klaudia Jans-Ignacik and US Open with Lara Arruabarrena.

In 2017, together with María José Martínez Sánchez, she reached her third consecutive quarterfinal at the US Open. In 2018, they also reached three finals, defeating en route top pairs Latisha Chan/Andrea Sestini Hlaváčková (Brisbane) and Tímea Babos/Kristina Mladenovic (Doha). They lost two tie-breakers in the semifinal of the Madrid Open against Ekaterina Makarova/Elena Vesnina.

Klepač also appeared in the quarterfinals of the 2018 French Open, and the 2019 Australian Open, partnering with Martínez Sánchez, and of the 2021 French Open, alongside Croatian Darija Jurak.

Klepač came back to Tour in 2026 after 4 years hiatus at 2026 Australian Open partnering Marie Bouzková.

== World TeamTennis ==
Klepač has played four seasons with World TeamTennis starting in 2016 when she debuted in the league with the Washington Kastles. In 2017, she played her first season for the Orange County Breakers and was named the Female MVP of the 2017 World TeamTennis Finals after leading the Breakers to the title. She played for Breakers for the 2018 and 2019 seasons as well.

It was announced that she would join the Orange County Breakers during the 2020 WTT season set to begin July 12 but was cancelled due to the COVID-19 pandemic.

== Significant finals ==
=== WTA 1000 tournaments ===
==== Doubles: 3 (1 title, 2 runner-ups) ====
| Result | Year | Tournament | Surface | Partner | Opponents | Score |
|---|---|---|---|---|---|---|
| Loss | 2018 | Qatar Ladies Open | Hard | (Spain) María José Martínez Sánchez | (Canada) Gabriela Dabrowski (Latvia) Jeļena Ostapenko | 3–6, 3–6 |
| Win | 2019 | Cincinnati Open | Hard | (Czech Republic) Lucie Hradecká | (Germany) Anna-Lena Grönefeld (Netherlands) Demi Schuurs | 6–4, 6–1 |
| Loss | 2021 | Canadian Open | Hard | (Croatia) Darija Jurak | (Canada) Gabriela Dabrowski (Brazil) Luisa Stefani | 3–6, 4–6 |

=== WTA Elite Trophy ===
==== Doubles: 1 (title) ====
| Result | Year | Tournament | Surface | Partner | Opponents | Score |
|---|---|---|---|---|---|---|
| Win | 2019 | Elite Trophy, Zhuhai | Hard (i) | (Ukraine) Lyudmyla Kichenok | (China) Duan Yingying (China) Yang Zhaoxuan | 6–3, 6–3 |

== Grand Slam doubles performance timeline ==
Key
| W | F | SF | QF | #R | RR | Q# | DNQ | A | NH |

(W) winner; (F) finalist; (SF) semifinalist; (QF) quarterfinalist; (#R) rounds 4, 3, 2, 1; (RR) round-robin stage; (Q#) qualification round; (DNQ) did not qualify; (A) absent; (NH) not held; (SR) strike rate (events won / competed); (W–L) win–loss record.
To avoid confusion and double counting, these charts are updated at the conclusion of a tournament or when the player's participation has ended.

| Tournament | 2009 | 2010 | 2011 | 2012 | 2013 | 2014 | 2015 | 2016 | 2017 | 2018 | 2019 | 2020 | 2021 | 2022 | SR | W–L |
|---|---|---|---|---|---|---|---|---|---|---|---|---|---|---|---|---|
| Australian Open | A | A | A | 3R | 1R | 1R | QF | 1R | 3R | 1R | QF | 1R | 2R | 1R | 0 / 11 | 11–11 |
| French Open | 2R | A | A | 1R | A | 2R | 1R | 3R | 3R | QF | 3R | 1R | QF | 1R | 0 / 11 | 14–11 |
| Wimbledon | Q1 | A | 1R | 2R | A | 1R | 1R | 1R | 3R | 3R | 1R | NH | 1R | QF | 0 / 10 | 8–10 |
| US Open | A | A | 3R | 1R | 2R | 1R | QF | QF | QF | 1R | 1R | 2R | 3R | 3R | 0 / 12 | 17–12 |
| Win–loss | 1–1 | 0–0 | 2–2 | 3–4 | 1–2 | 1–4 | 6–4 | 5–4 | 9–4 | 5–4 | 5–4 | 1–3 | 6–4 | 4–4 | 0 / 44 | 50–44 |

== WTA Tour finals ==
=== Singles: 1 (runner-up) ===
| Legend Tier I Tier II Tier III, IV & V (0–1) | Finals by surface Clay (0–1) |

| Result | W–L | Date | Tournament | Tier | Surface | Opponent | Score |
|---|---|---|---|---|---|---|---|
| Loss | 0–1 | Jul 2008 | Budapest Grand Prix, Hungary | Tier III | Clay | (France) Alizé Cornet | 6–7^{(5–7)}, 3–6 |

=== Doubles: 24 (11 titles, 13 runner-ups) ===
| Legend WTA Elite Trophy (1–0) Tier I / Premier M & Premier 5 / WTA 1000 (1–2) Tier II / Premier / WTA 500 (4–4) Tier III, IV & V / International / WTA 250 (5–7) | Finals by surface Hard (6–9) Clay (3–4) Grass (2–0) |

| Result | W–L | Date | Tournament | Tier | Surface | Partner | Opponents | Score |
|---|---|---|---|---|---|---|---|---|
| Loss | 0–1 | Sep 2007 | Koper Open, Slovenia | Tier IV | Hard | (Russia) Elena Likhovtseva | (Czech Republic) Lucie Hradecká (Czech Republic) Renata Voráčová | 7–5, 4–6, [7–10] |
| Loss | 0–2 | Apr 2009 | Barcelona Open, Spain | Tier III | Clay | (Romania) Sorana Cîrstea | (Spain) Nuria Llagostera Vives (Spain) María José Martínez Sánchez | 6–3, 2–6, [8–10] |
| Win | 1–2 | Jul 2013 | Gastein Ladies, Austria | International | Clay | (Austria) Sandra Klemenschits | (Germany) Kristina Barrois (Greece) Eleni Daniilidou | 6–1, 6–4 |
| Loss | 1–3 | Jul 2014 | Gastein Ladies, Austria | International | Clay | (Spain) María Teresa Torró Flor | (Czech Republic) Karolína Plíšková (Czech Republic) Kristýna Plíšková | 6–4, 3–6, [6–10] |
| Win | 2–3 | Jul 2014 | Bastad Open, Sweden | International | Clay | (Spain) María Teresa Torró Flor | (United Kingdom) Jocelyn Rae (United Kingdom) Anna Smith | 6–1, 6–1 |
| Win | 3–3 | Aug 2014 | Connecticut Open, United States | Premier | Hard | (Spain) Sílvia Soler Espinosa | (New Zealand) Marina Erakovic (Spain) Arantxa Parra Santonja | 7–5, 4–6, [10–7] |
| Loss | 3–4 | Oct 2014 | Tianjin Open, China | International | Hard | (Romania) Sorana Cîrstea | (Russia) Alla Kudryavtseva (Australia) Anastasia Rodionova | 7–6^{(8–6)}, 2–6, [8–10] |
| Loss | 3–5 | Aug 2015 | Washington Open, United States | International | Hard | (Spain) Lara Arruabarrena | (Switzerland) Belinda Bencic (France) Kristina Mladenovic | 5–7, 6–7^{(7–9)} |
| Win | 4–5 | Sep 2015 | Korea Open, South Korea | International | Hard | (Spain) Lara Arruabarrena | (Netherlands) Kiki Bertens (Sweden) Johanna Larsson | 2–6, 6–3, [10–6] |
| Loss | 4–6 | Oct 2015 | Hong Kong Open, China SAR | International | Hard | (Spain) Lara Arruabarrena | (France) Alizé Cornet (Kazakhstan) Yaroslava Shvedova | 5–7, 4–6 |
| Win | 5–6 | Sep 2017 | Pan Pacific Open, Japan | Premier | Hard | (Spain) María José Martínez Sánchez | (Australia) Daria Gavrilova (Russia) Daria Kasatkina | 6–3, 6–2 |
| Loss | 5–7 | Jan 2018 | Brisbane International, Australia | Premier | Hard | (Spain) María José Martínez Sánchez | (Netherlands) Kiki Bertens (Netherlands) Demi Schuurs | 5–7, 2–6 |
| Loss | 5–8 | Feb 2018 | Qatar Ladies Open | Premier 5 | Hard | (Spain) María José Martínez Sánchez | (Canada) Gabriela Dabrowski (Latvia) Jeļena Ostapenko | 3–6, 3–6 |
| Loss | 5–9 | Apr 2018 | Charleston Open, United States | Premier | Clay | (Spain) María José Martínez Sánchez | (Russia) Alla Kudryavtseva (Slovenia) Katarina Srebotnik | 3–6, 3–6 |
| Win | 6–9 | Jun 2018 | Mallorca Open, Spain | International | Grass | (Spain) María José Martínez Sánchez | (Czech Republic) Lucie Šafářová (Czech Republic) Barbora Štefková | 6–1, 3–6, [10–3] |
| Win | 7–9 | Aug 2019 | Cincinnati Open, United States | Premier 5 | Hard | (Czech Republic) Lucie Hradecká | (Germany) Anna-Lena Grönefeld (Netherlands) Demi Schuurs | 6–4, 6–1 |
| Win | 8–9 | Oct 2019 | WTA Elite Trophy, China | Elite Trophy | Hard (i) | (Ukraine) Lyudmyla Kichenok | (China) Duan Yingying (China) Yang Zhaoxuan | 6–3, 6–3 |
| Loss | 8–10 | May 2021 | Parma Open, Italy | WTA 250 | Clay | (Croatia) Darija Jurak | (United States) Coco Gauff (United States) Caty McNally | 3–6, 2–6 |
| Win | 9–10 | Jun 2021 | Bad Homburg Open, Germany | WTA 250 | Grass | (Croatia) Darija Jurak | (Ukraine) Nadiia Kichenok (Romania) Raluca Olaru | 6–3, 6–1 |
| Win | 10–10 | Aug 2021 | Silicon Valley Classic, United States | WTA 500 | Hard | (Croatia) Darija Jurak | (Canada) Gabriela Dabrowski (Brazil) Luisa Stefani | 6–1, 7–5 |
| Loss | 10–11 | Aug 2021 | Canadian Open, Canada | WTA 1000 | Hard | (Croatia) Darija Jurak | (Canada) Gabriela Dabrowski (Brazil) Luisa Stefani | 3–6, 4–6 |
| Loss | 10–12 | Jan 2022 | Adelaide International, Australia | WTA 500 | Hard | (Croatia) Darija Jurak Schreiber | (Australia) Ashleigh Barty (Australia) Storm Sanders | 1–6, 4–6 |
| Win | 11–12 | Apr 2022 | Charleston Open, United States | WTA 500 | Clay | (Poland) Magda Linette | (Czech Republic) Lucie Hradecká (India) Sania Mirza | 6–2, 4–6, [10–7] |
| Loss | 11–13 | Jul 2026 | Washington Open, United States | WTA 500 | Hard | (Japan) Makoto Ninomiya | (New Zealand) Erin Routliffe (Indonesia) Aldila Sutjiadi | 4–6, 1–6 |

== ITF Circuit finals ==
Legend
$100,000 tournaments
$75,000 tournaments
$50,000 tournaments
$25,000 tournaments
$10,000 tournaments

=== Singles: 7 (3 titles, 4 runner-ups) ===
| Result | W–L | Date | Tournament | Tier | Surface | Opponent | Score |
|---|---|---|---|---|---|---|---|
| Loss | 0–1 | Aug 2004 | ITF Maribor, Slovenia | 10,000 | Clay | (Slovenia) Maša Zec Peškirič | 6–2, 7–5 |
| Win | 1–1 | Apr 2005 | ITF Rabat, Morocco | 10,000 | Clay | (Slovakia) Dominika Cibulková | 6–1, 3–6, 6–4 |
| Loss | 1–2 | Mar 2006 | ITF Abu Dhabi, U.A.E. | 10,000 | Hard | (Ukraine) Katerina Avdiyenko | 6–4, 6–2 |
| Win | 2–2 | Jul 2006 | Bella Cup Torun, Poland | 25,000 | Clay | (Poland) Joanna Sakowicz | 6–0, 6–2 |
| Loss | 2–3 | Jul 2006 | ITF Dnipropetrovsk, Ukraine | 25,000 | Clay | (Ukraine) Kristina Antoniychuk | 6–3, 6–7^{(5)}, 6–4 |
| Win | 3–3 | Aug 2006 | ITF Maribor, Slovenia | 10,000 | Clay | (Bulgaria) Dia Evtimova | 6–4, 2–6, 6–3 |
| Loss | 3–4 | Mar 2011 | ITF Irapuato, Mexico | 25,000 | Hard | (New Zealand) Marina Erakovic | 7–5, 6–4 |

=== Doubles: 22 (14 titles, 8 runner-ups) ===
| Result | W–L | Date | Tournament | Tier | Surface | Partner | Opponents | Score |
|---|---|---|---|---|---|---|---|---|
| Win | 1–0 | Apr 2005 | ITF Rabat, Morocco | 10,000 | Clay | (Estonia) Anett Kaasik | (Morocco) Meryem El Haddad (Morocco) Habiba Ifrakh | 6–0, 6–2 |
| Win | 2–0 | Sep 2005 | ITF Madrid, Spain | 25,000 | Hard | (Croatia) Nika Ožegović | (Republic of Ireland) Kelly Liggan (Netherlands) Seda Noorlander | 6–3, 6–3 |
| Win | 3–0 | Mar 2006 | ITF Abu Dhabi, U.A.E. | 10,000 | Hard | (Czech Republic) Petra Cetkovská | (Ukraine) Katerina Avdiyenko (Georgia (country)) Kristina Grigorian | 6–1, 6–3 |
| Loss | 3–1 | Jun 2006 | ITF Padova, Italy | 25,000 | Clay | (Brazil) Larissa Carvalho | (Croatia) Darija Jurak (Czech Republic) Renata Voráčová | 6–4, 6–3 |
| Win | 4–1 | Jul 2006 | Bella Cup, Poland | 25,000 | Clay | (Belarus) Ekaterina Dzehalevich | (United States) Edina Gallovits-Hall (Slovakia) Lenka Tvarošková | 7–6^{(5)}, 6–4 |
| Win | 5–1 | Aug 2006 | ITF Alphen a/d Rijn, Netherlands | 25,000 | Clay | (Montenegro) Danica Krstajić | (Belgium) Leslie Butkiewicz (Belgium) Caroline Maes | 6–2, 7–6^{(1)} |
| Win | 6–1 | Apr 2007 | ITF Putignano, Italy | 25,000 | Hard | (Romania) Monica Niculescu | (United States) Jessica Kirkland (Germany) Carmen Klaschka | 6–2, 7–5 |
| Win | 7–1 | July 2007 | ITF Rimini, Italy | 75,000 | Clay | (Estonia) Maret Ani | (Serbia) Karolina Jovanović (Bosnia and Herzegovina) Mervana Jugić-Salkić | 6–4, 6–0 |
| Loss | 7–2 | Sep 2009 | Open de Saint-Malo, France | 100,000 | Clay | (France) Aurélie Védy | (Switzerland) Timea Bacsinszky (Italy) Tathiana Garbin | 6–3, ret. |
| Win | 8–2 | Dec 2009 | Zubr Cup Prerov, Czech Republic | 25,000 | Hard (i) | (Austria) Sandra Klemenschits | (Serbia) Darija Jurak (Hungary) Katalin Marosi | 7–6^{(3)}, 3–6, [10–7] |
| Loss | 8–3 | May 2010 | ITF Rio de Janeiro, Brazil | 25,000 | Clay | (Bolivia) María Fernanda Álvarez Terán | (Peru) Bianca Botto (United Kingdom) Amanda Carreras | 3–6, 6–4, [10–8] |
| Win | 9–3 | Jun 2010 | Maribor Open, Slovenia | 50,000 | Clay | (Slovenia) Tadeja Majerič | (Russia) Alexandra Panova (Russia) Ksenia Pervak | 6–3, 7–6^{(6)} |
| Win | 10–3 | Jun 2010 | ITF Padova, Italy | 25,000 | Clay | (Austria) Sandra Klemenschits | (Italy) Claudia Giovine (Italy) Valentina Sulpizio | 4–6, 6–4, [10–5] |
| Win | 11–3 | Jun 2010 | ITF Getxo, Spain | 25,000 | Clay | (Austria) Sandra Klemenschits | (China) Lu Jingjing (Germany) Laura Siegemund | 6–0, 6–0 |
| Loss | 11–4 | Jun 2010 | ITF Cuneo, Italy | 100,000 | Clay | (Romania) Sorana Cîrstea | (Czech Republic) Eva Birnerová (Czech Republic) Lucie Hradecká | 3–6, 6–4, [10–8] |
| Loss | 11–5 | Sep 2010 | ITF Biella, Italy | 100,000 | Clay | (France) Aurélie Védy | (Ukraine) Mariya Koryttseva (Romania) Raluca Olaru | 7–5, 6–4 |
| Loss | 11–6 | Sep 2010 | Save Cup Mestre, Italy | 50,000 | Clay | (Czech Republic) Eva Birnerová | (Italy) Claudia Giovine (Italy) Karin Knapp | 6–7^{(6)}, 7–5, [13–11] |
| Loss | 11–7 | Oct 2010 | ITF Jounieh Open, Lebanon | 100,000 | Clay | (Czech Republic) Eva Birnerová | (Czech Republic) Petra Cetkovská (Czech Republic) Renata Voráčová | 7–5, 6–2 |
| Loss | 11–8 | Jun 2011 | Bella Cup, Poland | 50,000 | Clay | (United States) Edina Gallovits-Hall | (France) Stéphanie Foretz Gacon (Germany) Tatjana Malek | 6–2, 7–5 |
| Win | 12–8 | Aug 2011 | Tatarstan Open, Russia | 50,000 | Hard | (Russia) Ekaterina Lopes | (Russia) Vitalia Diatchenko (Russia) Alexandra Panova | w/o |
| Win | 13–8 | Jun 2013 | Open de Marseille, France | 100,000 | Clay | (Austria) Sandra Klemenschits | (United States) Asia Muhammad (United States) Allie Will | 1–6, 6–4, [10–5] |
| Win | 14–8 | Dec 2019 | Dubai Tennis Challenge, U.A.E. | 100,000 | Hard | (Czech Republic) Lucie Hradecká | (Spain) Georgina García Pérez (Spain) Sara Sorribes Tormo | 7–5, 3–6, [10–8] |
