= María Teresa Torró Flor =

Spanish tennis player (born 1992)

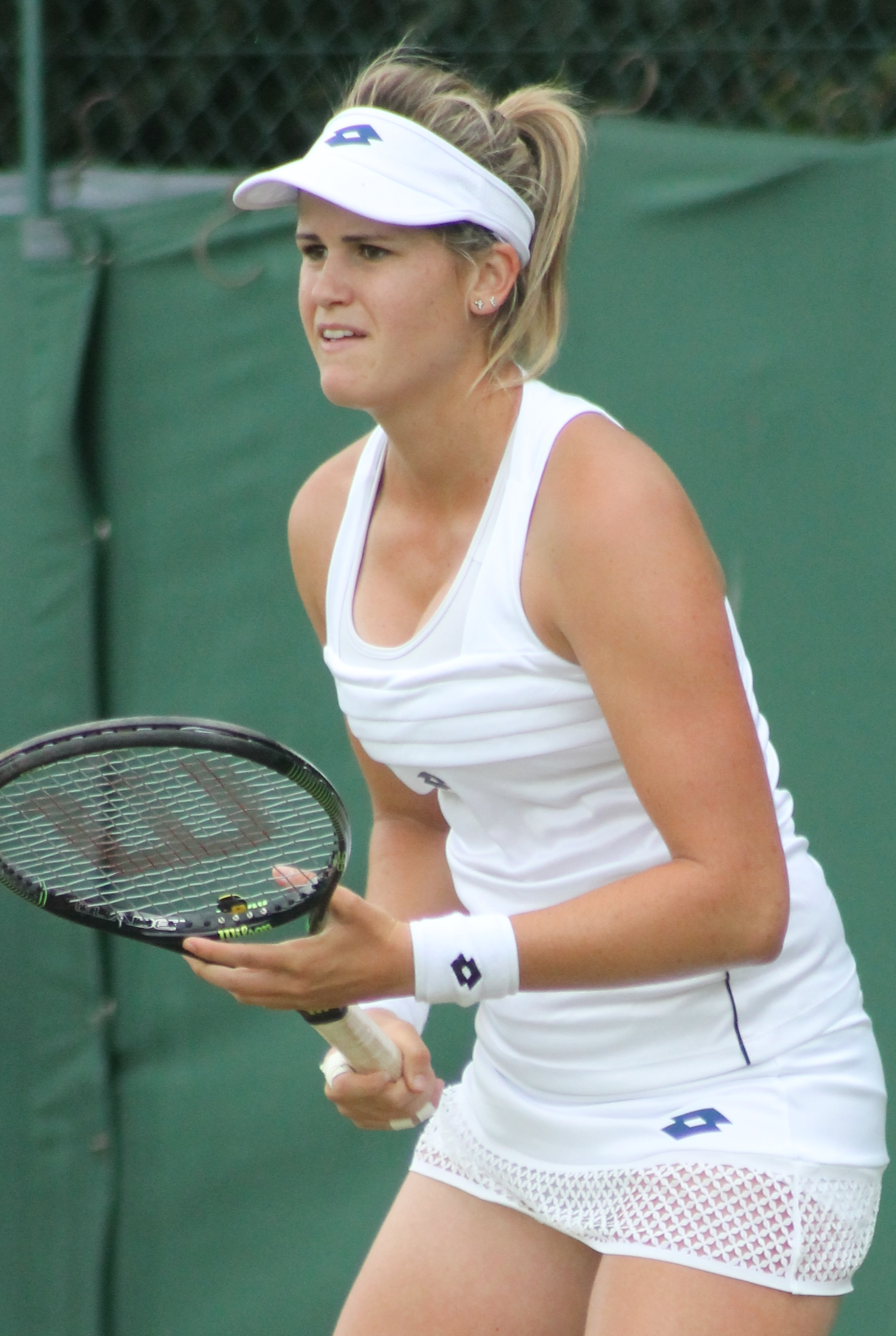
- Torró Flor during the 2015 Wimbledon Qualifying
- Country (sports): Spain
- Born: 2 May 1992 (age 33) Villena, Spain
- Height: 1.78 m (5 ft 10 in)
- Plays: Right-handed (two-handed backhand)
- Prize money: $1,054,057

Singles
- Career record: 269–177
- Career titles: 1 WTA, 18 ITF
- Highest ranking: No. 47 (5 May 2014)

Grand Slam singles results
- Australian Open: 1R (2013, 2015)
- French Open: 3R (2014)
- Wimbledon: 2R (2013)
- US Open: 2R (2013)

Doubles
- Career record: 67–51
- Career titles: 3 WTA, 5 ITF
- Highest ranking: No. 47 (8 June 2015)

Grand Slam doubles results
- Australian Open: 3R (2015)
- French Open: QF (2015)
- Wimbledon: 1R (2013, 2014)
- US Open: 1R (2014, 2015)

Grand Slam mixed doubles results
- Wimbledon: 1R (2013)

Team competitions
- Fed Cup: 2–3

María Teresa Torró Flor (Spanish pronunciation: [maˈɾi.a teˈɾesa toˈro floɾ]; born 2 May 1992) is a Spanish former professional tennis player.

In her career, Torró Flor won one singles title and three doubles titles on the WTA Tour, as well as 18 singles and five doubles titles on the ITF Women's Circuit. On 5 May 2014, she reached her career-high singles ranking of world No. 47. On 8 June 2015, she peaked at No. 47 in the doubles rankings.

Torró Flor was victorious upon her debut for the Spain Fed Cup team in February 2013, defeating Ukraine's Yuliya Beygelzimer in their 2013 Fed Cup World Group II tie.

== Biography ==
María Teresa Torró Flor was born on 2 May 1992 to Francisco Torró, an engineer, and Marita Teresa Flor, a teacher. She has one sister, Ana. She started playing tennis at the age of 4. Her favorite shot is her forehand; her favorite surface is clay. Her tennis idol growing up was Juan Carlos Ferrero; her favorite singer is Rihanna, and her favorite actor is Leonardo DiCaprio. She enjoys listening to music, reading, watching movies, and soccer. She has a dog named Greta.

== Career ==
=== 2012 ===
Torró Flor began her 2012 season by playing a $25k tournament in Andrézieux-Bouthéon, France, where she lost in the first round of qualifying to Garbiñe Muguruza. She remained in France to play one more $25k event in Grenoble, for which she qualified. In the first round of the main draw, she overcame fellow qualifier and home favorite Jessica Ginier, only to be swept aside by fifth seeded Sandra Záhlavová in the second round.

Torró Flor then played her third consecutive $25k tournament in Rabat. She once more qualified, and defeated Cristina Dinu and Laura Thorpe en route to the quarterfinals where she lost to Jasmina Tinjić.

=== 2014 ===
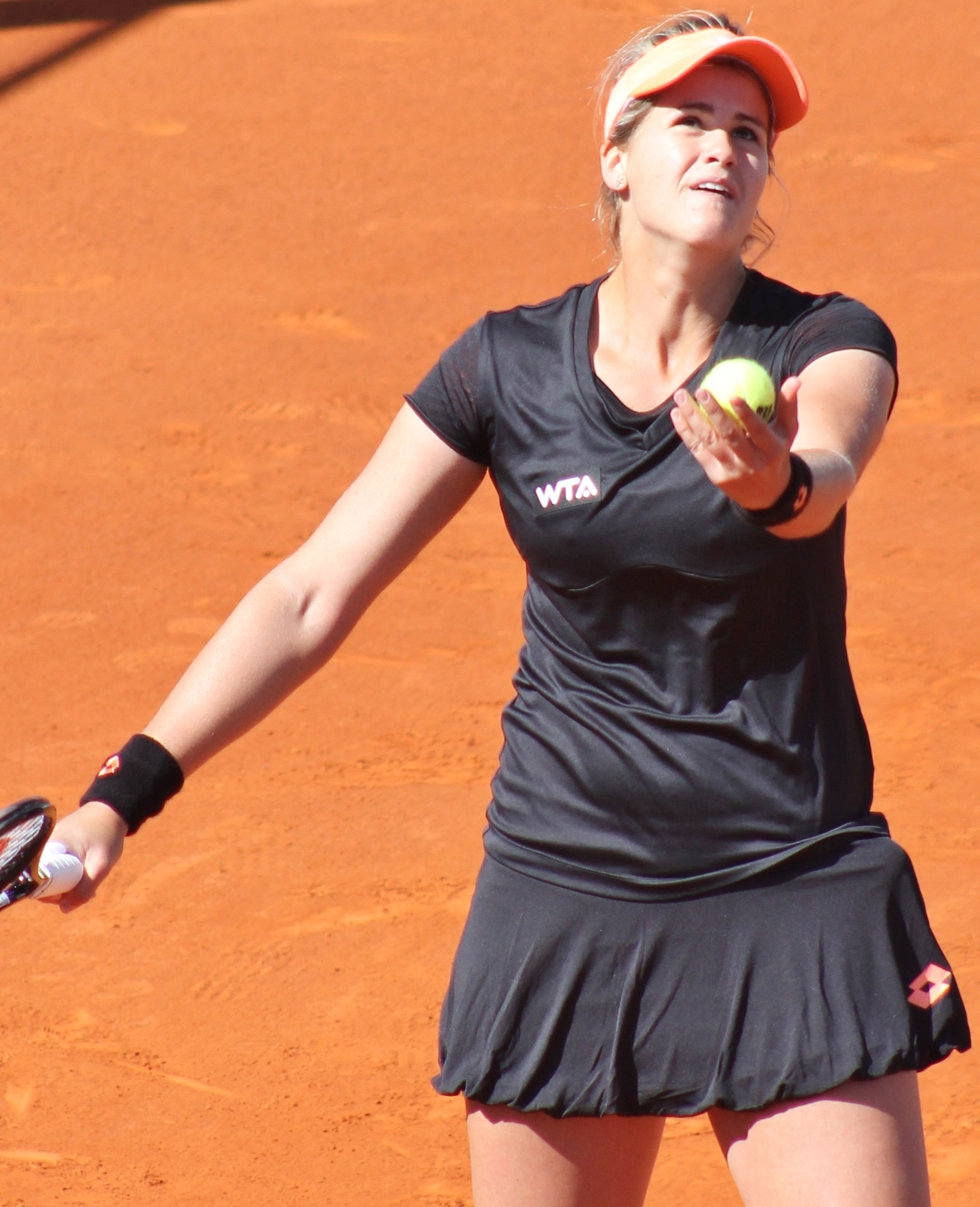
Torró Flor at the 2014 Madrid Open

Torró Flor missed the Shenzhen Open and the Australian Open due to a left leg injury.

She returned from injury in February at the Open GdF Suez in Paris. She lost in the first round of qualifying to Nadia Petrova. During the Fed Cup tie against the Czech Republic, Torró Flor played one rubber and lost to Klára Zakopalová. The Czech Republic ended up winning 3–2 over Spain to advance to the semifinal round. Seeded sixth at the first edition of the Rio Open, Torró Flor was defeated in the first round by qualifier Nastassja Burnett. Next, she played at the Brasil Tennis Cup. Seeded seventh, Torró Flor lost in the first round to Brazilian Teliana Pereira. In March, Torró Flor played at the Indian Wells Open. She won her first-round match when her opponent, Galina Voskoboeva, retired due to an upper respiratory infection. In the second round, she stunned fifth seed Angelique Kerber to earn her first career win over a top ten player. She was defeated in the third round by Alisa Kleybanova. At the Miami Open, Torró Flor lost in the first round to Andrea Petkovic. In April, Torró Flor played in the Fed Cup tie versus Poland. She won her first rubber over Urszula Radwańska but then lost her second rubber to Agnieszka Radwańska. Poland ended up winning 3–2.

Torró Flor began her clay-court season at the Morocco Open. She reached her first WTA final defeating fourth seed Bojana Jovanovski, qualifier Lara Arruabarrena, Polona Hercog, and fifth seed Garbiñe Muguruza. In the final, she beat Romina Oprandi to win her first WTA singles title. After this win, she broke into the world's top 50 for the first time in her career. At the Portugal Open, Torró Flor was defeated in the second round by seventh seed and eventual finalist, Svetlana Kuznetsova. At the Madrid Open, Torró Flor lost in the first round to Anastasia Pavlyuchenkova. At the Italian Open, Torró Flor was defeated in the first round of qualifying by Mona Barthel. She played at the Internationaux de Strasbourg and lost in the first round to Madison Keys. At the French Open, she beat 30th seed Klára Koukalová and Magdaléna Rybáriková in her first two rounds but was defeated in the third round by fourth seed and eventual finalist, Simona Halep.

Starting her grass-court season at the Rosmalen Open, Torró Flor lost in the first round to eighth seed Klára Koukalová. At the Wimbledon Championships, she was defeated in the first round by 30th seed, former world No. 1, and five-time Wimbledon champion, Venus Williams.

== Grand Slam singles performance timeline ==
Key
W	F	SF	QF	#R	RR	Q#	DNQ	A	NH

(W) winner; (F) finalist; (SF) semifinalist; (QF) quarterfinalist; (#R) rounds 4, 3, 2, 1; (RR) round-robin stage; (Q#) qualification round; (DNQ) did not qualify; (A) absent; (NH) not held; (SR) strike rate (events won / competed); (W–L) win–loss record.
To avoid confusion and double counting, these charts are updated at the conclusion of a tournament or when the player's participation has ended.

Tournament	2012	2013	2014	2015	2016	2017	2018	2019	2020	W–L
Australian Open	A	1R	A	1R	Q1	A	Q1	A		0–2
French Open	A	2R	3R	1R	A	A	A	A		3–3
Wimbledon	A	2R	1R	Q2	A	A	A	A		1–2
US Open	Q1	2R	1R	Q2	A	A	A	A		1–2
Win–loss	0–0	3–4	2–3	0–2	0–0	0–0	0–0	0–0		5–9
Career statistics
Year-end ranking	99	65	89	127	460	210	805			$1,054,057

== WTA career finals ==
=== Singles: 1 (title) ===
Legend Grand Slam WTA Premier Mandatory & 5 WTA Premier WTA International (1–0)	Finals by surface Hard (0–0) Clay (1–0) Grass (0–0) Carpet (0–0)

Result	W–L	Date	Tournament	Tier	Surface	Opponent	Score
Win	1–0	Apr 2014	Morocco Open	International	Clay	(Switzerland) Romina Oprandi	6–3, 3–6, 6–3

=== Doubles: 4 (3 titles, 1 runner–up) ===
Legend Grand Slam WTA Premier Mandatory & 5 WTA Premier WTA International (3–1)	Finals by surface Hard (2–0) Clay (1–1) Grass (0–0) Carpet (0–0)

Result	W–L	Date	Tournament	Tier	Surface	Partner	Opponents	Score
Win	1–0	Jan 2013	Hobart International, Australia	International	Hard	(Spain) Garbiñe Muguruza	(Hungary) Tímea Babos (Luxembourg) Mandy Minella	6–3, 7–6^{(7–5)}
Loss	1–1	Jul 2014	Gastein Ladies, Austria	International	Clay	(Slovenia) Andreja Klepač	(Czech Republic) Karolína Plíšková (Czech Republic) Kristýna Plíšková	6–4, 3–6, [6–10]
Win	2–1	Jul 2014	Bastad Open, Sweden	International	Clay	(Slovenia) Andreja Klepač	(United Kingdom) Jocelyn Rae (United Kingdom) Anna Smith	6–1, 6–1
Win	3–1	Feb 2015	Acapulco Open, Mexico	International	Hard	(Spain) Lara Arruabarrena	(Czech Republic) Andrea Hlaváčková (Czech Republic) Lucie Hradecká	7–6^{(7–2)}, 5–7, [13–11]

== ITF finals ==
=== Singles: 22 (18 titles, 4 runner–ups) ===
Legend $100,000 tournaments $80,000 tournaments $60,000 tournaments $25,000 tournaments $15,000 tournaments	Finals by surface Hard (1–1) Clay (17–3) Grass (0–0) Carpet (0–0)

Result	W–L	Date	Tournament	Tier	Surface	Opponent	Score
Win	1–0	Dec 2008	ITF Benicarló, Spain	10,000 (Note: The $10,000 ITF tournaments were reclassified as $15,000 in 2017. However, there were some $15,000 even before 2017.)	Clay	(United States) Ashley Weinhold	6–4, 1–6, 7–5
Win	2–0	Oct 2009	ITF Antalya, Turkey	10,000	Clay	(Belarus) Anna Orlik	6–0, 6–3
Win	3–0	Feb 2010	ITF Madrid, Spain	10,000	Clay	(Italy) Giulia Gatto-Monticone	7–5, 3–6, 6–4
Loss	3–1	Mar 2010	ITF Antalya, Turkey	10,000	Clay	(Italy) Julia Mayr	2–6, 1–6
Loss	3–2	Jul 2010	ITF La Coruña, Spain	25,000	Hard	(Spain) Leticia Costas	6–1, 4–6, 3–6
Loss	3–3	Sep 2010	ITF Foggia, Italy	25,000	Clay	(Spain) Laura Pous Tió	6–3, 3–6, 4–6
Win	4–3	Apr 2011	ITF Civitavecchia, Italy	25,000	Clay	(Italy) Anna Remondina	6–3, 6–4
Win	5–3	Apr 2012	ITF Civitavecchia, Italy	25,000	Clay	(Ukraine) Yuliya Beygelzimer	3–6, 7–5, 6–2
Win	6–3	Jun 2012	ITF Zlín, Czech Republic	25,000	Clay	(Bosnia and Herzegovina) Jasmina Tinjić	6–1, 1–6, 6–1
Win	7–3	Jun 2012	ITF Craiova, Romania	50,000 (Note: The $50,000 ITF tournaments were reclassified as $60,000 in 2017.)	Clay	(Romania) Andreea Mitu	6–3, 6–4
Win	8–3	Jun 2012	ITF Rome, Italy	25,000	Clay	(Croatia) Tereza Mrdeža	6–3, 6–0
Win	9–3	Jul 2012	Open Romania Ladies	100,000	Clay	(Spain) Garbiñe Muguruza	6–3, 4–6, 6–4
Win	10–3	Jul 2012	ITS Cup, Czech Republic	100,000	Clay	(Romania) Alexandra Cadanțu	6–2, 6–3
Win	11–3	Oct 2012	ITF Sant Cugat, Spain	25,000	Clay	(Spain) Estrella Cabeza Candela	6–1, 6–4
Win	12–3	May 2015	Open Saint-Gaudens, France	50,000	Clay	(Slovakia) Jana Čepelová	6–1, 6–0
Win	13–3	Aug 2015	ITF Prague, Czech Republic	75,000 (Note: The $75,000 ITF tournaments were reclassified as $75,000 in 2017.)	Clay	(Czech Republic) Denisa Allertová	6–3, 7–6^{(7–5)}
Win	14–3	Jan 2017	ITF Hammamet, Tunisia	15,000	Clay	(Austria) Julia Grabher	6–2, 6–2
Win	15–3	Jan 2017	ITF Hammamet, Tunisia	15,000	Clay	(Romania) Alexandra Dulgheru	6–3, ret.
Loss	15–4	Feb 2017	ITF Manacor, Spain	15,000	Clay	(Australia) Isabelle Wallace	3–6, 6–7^{(5–7)}
Win	16–4	Feb 2017	ITF Manacor, Spain	15,000	Clay	(Ukraine) Anastasia Zarycká	6–4, 6–2
Win	17–4	Jun 2017	ITF Figueira da Foz, Portugal	25,000	Hard	(Germany) Sarah-Rebecca Sekulic	6–4, 6–2
Win	18–4	Aug 2017	ITF Montreux, Switzerland	25,000	Clay	(Italy) Deborah Chiesa	4–6, 6–1, 6–2

=== Doubles: 6 (5 titles, 1 runner–up) ===
Legend $60,000 tournaments $25,000 tournaments $15,000 tournaments	Finals by surface Hard (0–0) Clay (5–1) Grass (0–0) Carpet (0–0)

Result	W–L	Date	Tournament	Tier	Surface	Partner	Opponents	Score
Loss	0–1	Aug 2010	ITF Koksijde, Belgium	25,000	Clay	(Spain) Lara Arruabarrena	(Italy) Nicole Clerico (Germany) Justine Ozga	7–5, 4–6, [6–10]
Win	1–1	Oct 2010	ITF Madrid, Spain	50,000	Clay	(Spain) Lara Arruabarrena	(Romania) Irina-Camelia Begu (Romania) Elena Bogdan	6–4, 7–5
Win	2–1	Jan 2017	ITF Hammamet, Tunisia	15,000	Clay	(France) Chloé Paquet	(France) Joséphine Boualem (Austria) Julia Grabher	6–4, 6–4
Win	3–1	Jan 2017	ITF Hammamet, Tunisia	15,000	Clay	(Brazil) Laura Pigossi	(Romania) Cristina Dinu (Russia) Yana Sizikova	6–2, 6–4
Win	4–1	Feb 2017	ITF Manacor, Spain	15,000	Clay	(Spain) Olga Sáez Larra	(Spain) Yvonne Cavallé Reimers (Ecuador) Charlotte Römer	6–3, 6–2
Win	5–1	Aug 2017	ITF Braunschweig, Germany	25,000	Clay	(Sweden) Cornelia Lister	(Russia) Anastasiya Komardina (Latvia) Diāna Marcinkēviča	3–6, 7–6^{(7–5)}, [11–9]

== Fed Cup participation ==
=== Singles ===
Edition	Stage	Date	Location	Against	Surface	Opponent	W/L	Score
2013	WG2	Feb 2013	Alicante, Spain	Ukraine	Clay	Yuliya Beygelzimer	W	6–4, 6–2
2014	WG 1R	Feb 2014	Seville, Spain	Czech Republic	Clay	Klára Zakopalová	L	3–6, 6–2, 1–6
2014	WG PO	Apr 2014	Barcelona, Spain	Poland	Clay	Urszula Radwańska	W	4–6, 6–0, 6–1
2014	WG PO	Apr 2014	Barcelona, Spain	Poland	Clay	Agnieszka Radwańska	L	3–6, 2–6

=== Doubles ===
Edition	Stage	Date	Location	Against	Surface	Partner	Opponents	W/L	Score
2013	WG2	Feb 2013	Alicante, Spain	Ukraine	Clay	Nuria Llagostera Vives	Yuliya Beygelzimer; Olga Savchuk	L	3–6, 6–2, [5–10]

== Junior Grand Slam finals ==
=== Girls' doubles: 1 (runner–up) ===
Result	Year	Tournament	Surface	Partner	Opponents	Score
Loss	2010	French Open	Clay	(Spain) Lara Arruabarrena	(Hungary) Tímea Babos (United States) Sloane Stephens	2–6, 3–6

=== Top-10 wins ===
#	Player	Rank	Event	Surface	Round	Score
2014
1.	(Germany) Angelique Kerber	No. 6	Indian Wells Open, United States	Hard	2R	2–6, 7–6^{(5)}, 6–4
