= Janina Toljan =

Austrian tennis player

- Country (sports): Austria
- Born: 27 March 1990 (age 36) Linz
- Prize money: $57,872

Singles
- Career record: 192–198
- Career titles: 3 ITF
- Highest ranking: No. 437 (20 October 2014)

Doubles
- Career record: 102–101
- Career titles: 5 ITF
- Highest ranking: No. 458 (28 September 2015)

Janina Toljan (born 27 March 1990) is an Austrian former tennis player.

In her career, Toljan won three singles and five doubles titles on the ITF Circuit. On 20 October 2014, she reached her career-high singles ranking of world No. 437. On 28 September 2015, she peaked at No. 458 in the doubles rankings.

== ITF Circuit finals ==
=== Singles: 8 (3 titles, 5 runner-ups) ===
Legend $100,000 tournaments $75,000 tournaments $50,000 tournaments $25,000 tournaments $10,000 tournaments	Finals by surface Hard (3–1) Clay (0–4)

Result	No.	Date	Tournament	Surface	Opponent	Score
Loss	1.	Aug 2007	ITF Pörtschach, Austria	Clay	(Sweden) Hanna Nooni	1–6, 6–4, 1–6
Loss	2.	May 2008	ITF Mostar, Bosnia & Herzegovina	Clay	(Australia) Johanna Konta	3–6, 6–3, 4–6
Win	1.	Feb 2010	ITF Eilat, Israel	Hard	(Slovakia) Jana Čepelová	6–1, 6–2
Loss	3.	Jun 2012	ITF Alkmaar, Netherlands	Clay	(Slovakia) Kristína Kučová	3–6, 4–6
Loss	4.	Aug 2012	ITF Pörtschach, Austria	Clay	(Austria) Yvonne Neuwirth	7–5, 3–6, 3–6
Loss	5.	Nov 2013	ITF Sharm El Sheikh, Egypt	Hard	(Serbia) Ivana Jorović	0–6, 2–6
Win	2.	May 2014	ITF Monzón, Spain	Hard	(Spain) María José Luque Moreno	6–3, 5–7, 6–0
Win	3.	May 2014	ITF Antalya, Turkey	Hard	(Romania) Daiana Negreanu	6–7^{(5)}, 6–4, 6–4

=== Doubles: 21 (5–16) ===
Legend $100,000 tournaments $75,000 tournaments $50,000 tournaments $25,000 tournaments $10,000 tournaments	Finals by surface Hard (4–6) Clay (1–10)

Result	No.	Date	Tournament	Surface	Partner	Opponents	Score
Loss	1.	16 July 2006	ITF Garching, Germany	Clay	(Serbia) Ana Veselinović	(Germany) Katharina Killi (Germany) Sarah Raab	5–7, 5–7
Loss	2.	22 June 2008	ITF Davos, Switzerland	Clay	(Czech Republic) Kateřina Kramperová	(Hungary) Katalin Marosi (Brazil) Marina Tavares	7–5, 4–6, [7–10]
Loss	3.	6 December 2009	ITF Havana, Cuba	Hard	(Austria) Lisa Summerer	(Ecuador) Mariana Correa (Russia) Angelina Gabueva	2–6, 6–7^{(6)}
Loss	4.	5 September 2010	ITF Istanbul, Turkey	Hard	(Belgium) Gally De Wael	(Denmark) Malou Ejdesgaard (Kyrgyzstan) Ksenia Palkina	4–6, 4–6
Win	1.	26 September 2010	ITF Madrid, Spain	Hard	(Germany) Lena-Marie Hofmann	(Spain) Laura Apaolaza Miradevilla (Spain) Yvonne Cavallé Reimers	7–6^{(7)}, 7–5
Win	2.	22 October 2010	ITF Acre, Israel	Hard	(Israel) Julia Glushko	(Belgium) Gally De Wael (Czech Republic) Zuzana Linhová	6–2, 6–2
Loss	5.	5 August 2011	ITF Vienna, Austria	Clay	(Bosnia and Herzegovina) Sandra Martinović	(Czech Republic) Simona Dobrá (Czech Republic) Lucie Kriegsmannová	4–6, 1–6
Win	3.	21 April 2012	ITF Antalya, Turkey	Hard	(Germany) Nicola Geuer	(United States) Lauren Megale (United States) Nicole Melichar	6–2, 6–2
Loss	6.	1 December 2012	ITF Antalya, Turkey	Clay	(Romania) Laura-Ioana Andrei	(Russia) Eugeniya Pashkova (Ukraine) Anastasiya Vasylyeva	6–4, 3–6, [2–10]
Loss	7.	10 March 2014	ITF Antalya, Turkey	Clay	(Slovakia) Lenka Juríková	(Japan) Mana Ayukawa (France) Estelle Cascino	5–7, 5–7
Loss	8.	12 May 2014	ITF Monzón, Spain	Hard	(Italy) Giulia Sussarello	(Spain) Ariadna Martí Riembau (Spain) Marta Sexmilo Pascual	6–4, 4–6, [5–10]
Loss	9.	12 October 2014	ITF Rock Hill, United States	Hard	(Greece) Despina Papamichail	(Netherlands) Cindy Burger (Canada) Sharon Fichman	6–4, 1–6, [6–10]
Win	4.	10 November 2014	ITF Sousse, Tunisia	Hard	(Russia) Natela Dzalamidze	(United Kingdom) Francesca Stephenson (Netherlands) Mandy Wagemaker	6–2, 6–1
Loss	10.	14 March 2015	ITF Solarino, Italy	Hard	(Ukraine) Sofiya Kovalets	(Hungary) Anna Bondár (Hungary) Dalma Gálfi	3–6, 2–6
Loss	11.	24 July 2015	ITF Bad Waltersdorf, Austria	Clay	(Austria) Nikola Hofmanova	(United States) Natalie Suk (Czech Republic) Anna Vrbenská	1–6, 5–7
Loss	12.	6 August 2015	ITF Vienna, Austria	Clay	(Hungary) Ágnes Bukta	(Australia) Sally Peers (France) Laëtitia Sarrazin	1–6, 2–6
Loss	13.	28 August 2015	ITF Pörtschach, Austria	Clay	(Croatia) Iva Primorac	(Austria) Mira Antonitsch (Austria) Julia Grabher	2–6, 1–6
Loss	14.	18 September 2015	ITF Brčko, Bosnia & Herzegovina	Clay	(Bosnia and Herzegovina) Anita Husarić	(Hungary) Ágnes Bukta (Slovakia) Vivien Juhászová	7–5, 4–6, [8–10]
Loss	15.	9 April 2016	ITF Heraklion, Greece	Hard	(Uzbekistan) Vlada Ekshibarova	(Russia) Victoria Kan (Ukraine) Alyona Sotnikova	1–6, 2–6
Win	5.	5 August 2016	ITF Vienna, Austria	Clay	(Germany) Vivian Heisen	(Czech Republic) Petra Krejsová (Czech Republic) Anna Slováková	6–3, 6–2
Loss	16.	1 September 2016	ITF Sankt Pölten, Austria	Clay	(Croatia) Mariana Dražić	(Poland) Justyna Jegiołka (Hungary) Vanda Lukács	4–6, 6–4, [9–11]
