= Lisa-Maria Moser =

Austrian tennis player (born 1991)

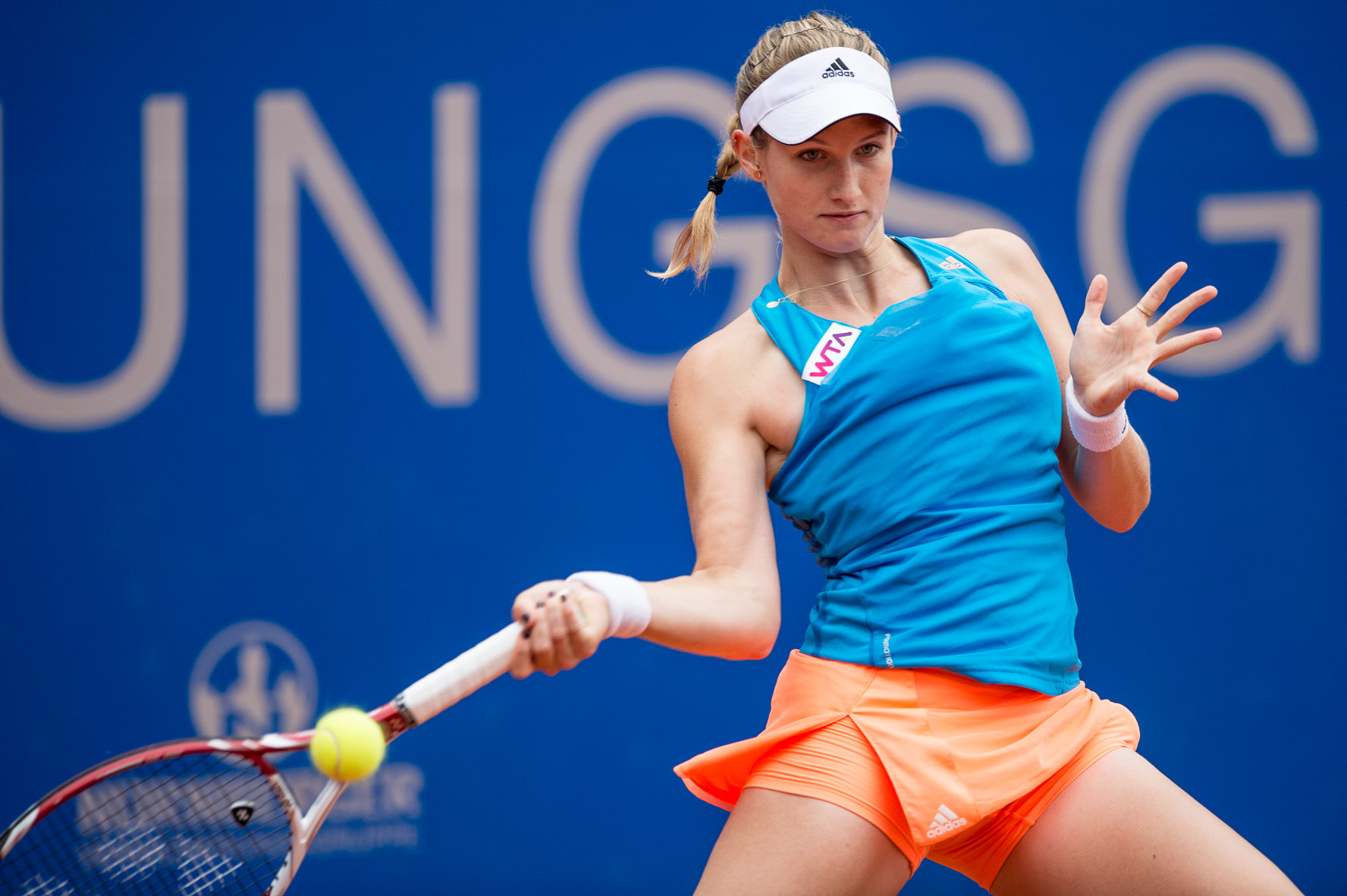
- Moser at the 2014 Nürnberger Versicherungscup
- Country (sports): Austria
- Born: 28 March 1991 (age 34) Graz, Austria
- Prize money: $46,737

Singles
- Career record: 121–118
- Career titles: 2 ITF
- Highest ranking: No. 280 (14 July 2014)

Doubles
- Career record: 24–35
- Career titles: 1 ITF
- Highest ranking: No. 480 (4 May 2015)

Lisa-Maria Moser (born 28 March 1991) is an Austrian former tennis player.

Moser won two singles titles and one doubles title on the ITF Women's Circuit in her career. On 28 July 2014, she reached her best singles ranking of world No. 280. On 4 May 2015, she peaked at No. 480 in the doubles rankings.

== Career ==
Moser was given a wildcard for the 2013 Gastein Ladies, where she made her WTA Tour main-draw debut, defeating qualifier Elena Bogdan in three sets to set up a second-round match against Mona Barthel. However, the German, ranked No. 31 in the world, had to retire with an injured shoulder in the second set, to send Moser through to a quarterfinal match-up with Andrea Hlaváčková. Her Czech opponent proved to be her decline, and the Austrian debutant lost in straight sets. As a result of her first WTA International quarterfinal appearance, Moser's career ranking jumped 331 places to world No. 394.

Later in the year, Moser was also given a wildcard into the doubles event of the Linz Open, partnering fellow Austrian player Nicole Rottmann, but they lost to top seeds Gabriela Dabrowski and Alicja Rosolska in the first round.

== Generali Ladies Linz controversy ==
Ranked world No. 322 in October 2013, Moser was awarded a wildcard into the main singles draw of the 2013 Generali Ladies Linz. However, just prior to the start of the tournament, it was announced that world No. 10, Angelique Kerber, would contest the event. As the original draw had already been released without Kerber's name, the draw was revised (excluding Moser) and she was subsequently given the top seed. Nonetheless, Kerber was placed in the bottom half of the draw and several seeds were moved around to accommodate her late entry. The move was seen as controversial because no top-10 player is allowed to participate in more than two International-level tournaments per season. Kerber had been allowed to play three (Monterrey, Washington and Linz) because, in the summer, she played the International-level event in Washington D.C. when the Premier-level tournament in Carlsbad was over-subscribed. Kerber, who was within points of qualifying for the year-end WTA Championships in Istanbul, was criticised for competing in (and later winning) a lower-level event to achieve substantial points and then withdrawing from her next scheduled tournament in Moscow, a Premier-level event. Moser, who had withdrawn upon request from tournament director Sandra Reichel, cited "personal reasons" as the official explanation for her absence.

At the 2014 edition of the tournament, Moser was again given a wildcard to compete in the singles draw, where she ultimately lost to world No. 44, Tsvetana Pironkova, in the first round.

== ITF finals ==
=== Singles: 4 (2 titles, 2 runner-ups) ===
Legend $15,000 tournaments $10,000 tournaments	Finals by surface Hard (2–1) Clay (0–1)

Result	No.	Date	Tier	Tournament	Surface	Opponent	Score
Win	1.	3 June 2013	10,000	ITF Sharm El Sheikh, Egypt	Hard	(Poland) Sylwia Zagórska	6–2, 6–4
Loss	1.	10 June 2013	10,000	ITF Sharm El Sheikh, Egypt	Hard	(Russia) Alina Mikheeva	4–6, 4–6
Loss	2.	2 September 2013	15,000	ITF Sarajevo, Bosnia & Herzegovina	Clay	(Germany) Lena-Marie Hofmann	4–6, 2–6
Win	2.	22 September 2014	10,000	ITF Antalya, Turkey	Hard	(Italy) Claudia Giovine	7–5, 6–4

=== Doubles: 3 (1 title, 2 runner-ups) ===
Legend $15,000 tournaments $10,000 tournaments	Finals by surface Hard (1–1) Clay (0–1)

Result	No.	Date	Tier	Tournament	Surface	Partner	Opponents	Score
Loss	1.	10 December 2007	10,000	ITF Havana, Cuba	Hard	(Austria) Nicole Rottmann	(Mexico) Daniela Múñoz Gallegos (Mexico) Valeria Pulido	3–6, 4–6
Loss	2.	2 September 2013	15,000	ITF Sarajevo, Bosnia & Herzegovina	Clay	(Bosnia and Herzegovina) Anita Husarić	(Slovakia) Vivien Juhászová (Czech Republic) Tereza Malíková	4–6, 1–6
Win	1.	20 April 2015	15,000	ITF Heraklion, Greece	Hard	(Hungary) Anna Bondár	(Oman) Fatma Al-Nabhani (India) Sharmada Balu	6–3, 7–5
