= Yvonne Neuwirth =

Austrian tennis player

- Country (sports): Austria
- Born: 4 August 1992 (age 32); Austria
- Prize money: $41,302

Singles
- Career record: 157–103
- Career titles: 1 ITF
- Highest ranking: No. 305 (14 July 2014)

Doubles
- Career record: 48–54
- Career titles: 2 ITF
- Highest ranking: No. 442 (18 May 2015)
- Last updated on: 5 March 2024.

Yvonne Neuwirth (born 4 August 1992) is an Austrian tennis player.

She won one singles title and two doubles titles on the ITF Women's Circuit. On 14 July 2014, she reached her best singles ranking of world No. 305. On 18 May 2015, she peaked at No. 442 in the doubles rankings.

Neuwirth made her WTA Tour main-draw debut at the 2012 Gastein Ladies.

== ITF Circuit finals ==
=== Singles: 7 (1 title, 6 runner–ups) ===
Legend $25,000 tournaments $15,000 tournaments $10,000 tournaments	Finals by surface Hard (0–1) Clay (1–4) Grass (0–1)

Result	W–L	Date	Tournament	Tier	Surface	Opponent	Score
Loss	0–1	Apr 2011	ITF Lucknow, India	10,000	Grass	(India) Sharmada Balu	3–6, 6–2, 2–6
Loss	0–2	Apr 2012	ITF Algiers, Algeria	10,000	Clay	(Switzerland) Conny Perrin	3–6, 0–6
Win	1–2	Aug 2012	ITF Pörtschach, Austria	10,000	Clay	(Austria) Janina Toljan	5–7, 6–3, 6–3
Loss	1–3	Jul 2013	ITF Bad Waltersdorf, Austria	10,000	Clay	(Croatia) Adrijana Lekaj	2–6, 4–6
Loss	1–4	May 2014	ITF Maribor, Slovenia	25,000	Clay	(Czech Republic) Kateřina Siniaková	1–6, 5–7
Loss	1–5	Jul 2019	ITF Tabarka, Tunisia	15,000	Clay	(Italy) Anna Turati	4–6, 6–7^{(4)}
Loss	1–6	Oct 2019	ITF Pretoria, South Africa	15,000	Hard	(Netherlands) Merel Hoedt	2–6, 1–6

=== Doubles: 7 (2–5) ===
Legend $25,000 tournaments $10,000 tournaments	Finals by surface Hard (0–1) Clay (2–4)

Result	No.	Date	Tournament	Surface	Partner	Opponents	Score
Loss	1.	28 March 2011	ITF New Delhi, India	Hard	(Austria) Stephanie Hirsch	(Slovenia) Anja Prislan (India) Kyra Shroff	3–6, 5–7
Loss	2.	25 July 2011	ITF Bad Waltersdorf, Austria	Clay	(Austria) Pia König	(Bosnia and Herzegovina) Sandra Martinović (Czech Republic) Kateřina Vaňková	3–6, 6–3, [8–10]
Loss	3.	22 August 2011	ITF Pörtschach, Austria	Clay	(Austria) Pia König	(Russia) Victoria Kan (Belarus) Ilona Kremen	1–6, 3–6
Loss	4.	23 September 2013	ITF Prague, Czech Republic	Clay	(Germany) Jil Nora Engelmann	(Czech Republic) Jesika Malečková (Czech Republic) Tereza Malíková	2–6, 2–6
Win	1.	16 June 2014	ITF Ystad, Sweden	Clay	(Slovenia) Nastja Kolar	(Kazakhstan) Anna Danilina (Switzerland) Xenia Knoll	7–6^{(3)}, 3–6, [10–6]
Loss	5.	18 May 2015	ITF Velenje, Slovenia	Clay	(Germany) Anna Klasen	(Slovenia) Nina Potočnik (Slovenia) Natalija Šipek	6–4, 3–6, [4–10]
Win	2.	7 March 2016	ITF Antalya, Turkey	Clay	(Austria) Nicole Rottmann	(Romania) Andreea Ghițescu (Romania) Raluca Șerban	2–6, 6–4, [10–5]

== ITF Junior finals ==
Category G1
Category G2
Category G3
Category G4
Category G5

=== Doubles (0–1) ===
Outcome	No.	Date	Tournament	Grade	Surface	Partner	Opponents	Score
Runner-up	1.	Jul 2009	Corfu, Greece	G5	Carpet	(Austria) Sabrina Emerschitz	(Israel) Rona Lavian (Israel) Noy Mor	1–6, 2–6
