= Andrea Petkovic career statistics =

Career finals
Discipline	Type	Won	Lost	Total
Singles	Grand Slam	–	–	–
Singles	Summer Olympics	–	–	–
Singles	WTA Finals	–	–	–
Singles	WTA Elite Trophy (Note: WTA Tournament of Champions was held from 2009 to 2014, when WTA Elite Trophy replaced it.)	1	–	1
Singles	WTA 1000	–	1	1
Singles	WTA Tour	6	5	11
Singles	Total	7	6	13
Doubles	Grand Slam	–	–	–
Doubles	Summer Olympics	–	–	–
Doubles	WTA Finals	–	–	–
Doubles	WTA 1000	–	–	–
Doubles	WTA Tour	1	2	3
Doubles	Total	1	2	3
Total		8	8	16

This is a list of the main career statistics of professional German tennis player, Andrea Petkovic. To date, Petkovic has won seven WTA singles titles including one year-ending championship at the 2014 Tournament of Champions. Other highlights of Petkovic's career include a runner-up finish at the 2011 China Open, a semifinal appearance at the 2014 French Open and quarterfinal appearances at the 2011 Australian Open and 2011 US Open. Petkovic achieved a career-high singles ranking of world No. 9 on October 10, 2011.

== Career achievements ==
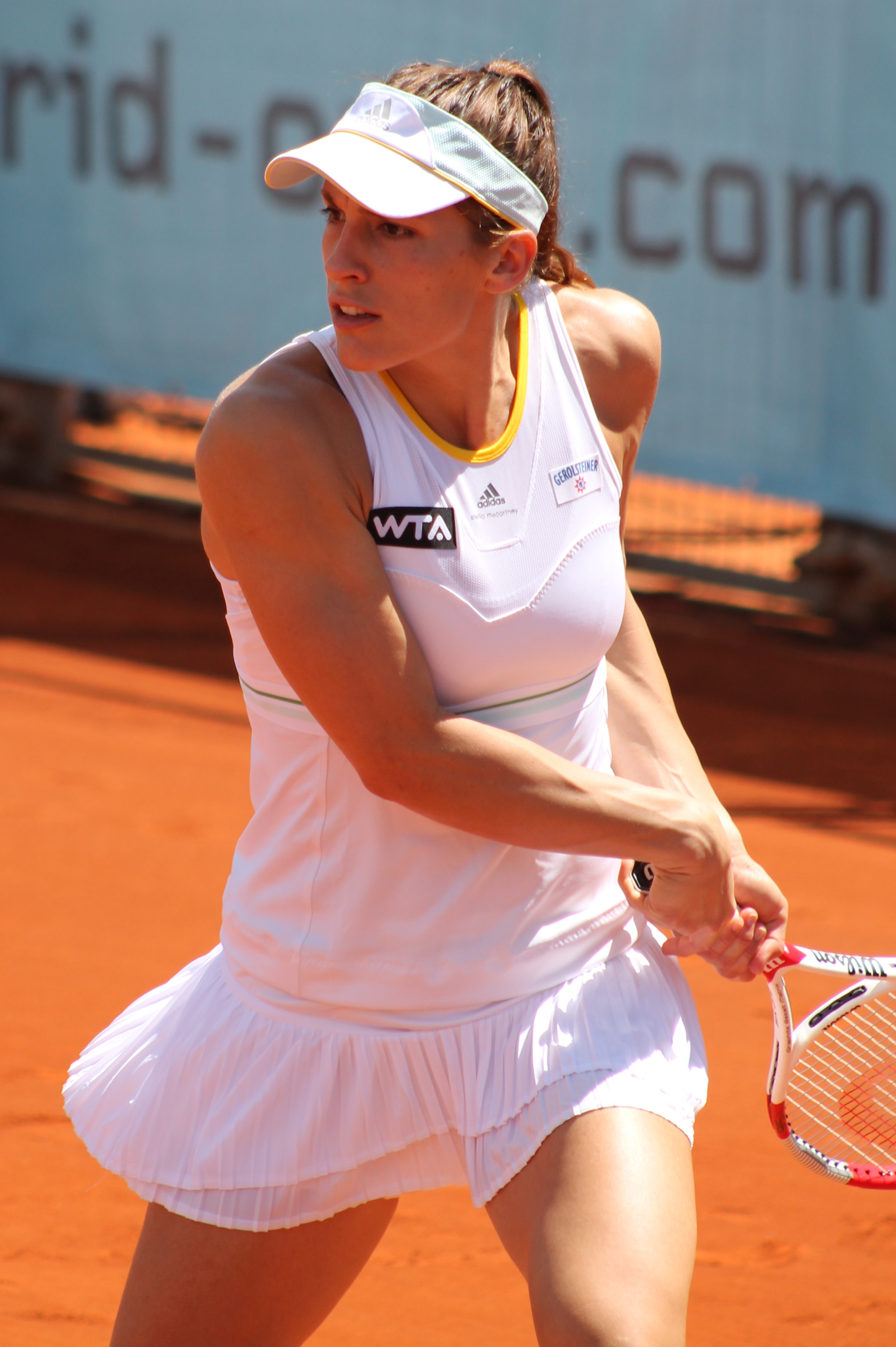
Petkovic has enjoyed most of her success on clay with four of her titles coming on this surface. She was also a semifinalist at the 2014 French Open.

In July 2009, Petkovic won the first WTA Tour singles title of her career at the International event in Bad Gastein, Austria after a straight sets win over Ioana Raluca Olaru in the final. At the 2011 Australian Open, she defeated the 2008 champion and former world No. 1, Maria Sharapova in the fourth round to reach her first Grand Slam quarterfinal where she lost in straight sets to the ninth seed and eventual runner-up, Li Na. In March 2011, she reached her first Premier Mandatory semifinal at the Sony Ericsson Open, upsetting world No. 1, Caroline Wozniacki, and sixth seed Jelena Janković en route before falling to Sharapova in three sets. Two months later, she won her second career singles title at the Internationaux de Strasbourg before reaching her second consecutive Grand Slam quarterfinal at the French Open where she lost to Sharapova in straight sets, winning just three games. After quarterfinal and semifinal appearances at the Rogers Cup and Western & Southern Open respectively, Petkovic reached her third Grand Slam quarterfinal of the year at the US Open, where she lost in straight sets to the top-seeded Wozniacki. In October, she reached the biggest final of her career to date at the China Open where she lost to the 11th seed Agnieszka Radwańska in three sets. Petkovic rose to a career high of World No. 9 as a result of this performance and eventually finished the year ranked World No. 10, marking her first finish in the year-end top ten.

In April 2014, Petkovic won her first WTA Premier singles title and first career title on green clay at the Family Circle Cup, defeating Jana Čepelová (who had upset world No. 1 and two-time defending champion, Serena Williams earlier in the tournament) in the final. It was Petkovic's first tour level singles title in three years and remains the biggest title of her career thus far. In June, Petkovic advanced to her first Grand Slam semifinal at the French Open, defeating tenth seed and 2012 finalist Sara Errani en route before losing to the eventual runner-up, Simona Halep, in straight sets. The following month, she won her second title in Bad Gastein, defeating first time finalist Shelby Rogers, in straight sets.

== Performance timelines ==
Key
W	F	SF	QF	#R	RR	Q#	P#	DNQ	A	Z#	PO	G	S	B	NMS	NTI	P	NH

(W) winner; (F) finalist; (SF) semifinalist; (QF) quarterfinalist; (#R) rounds 4, 3, 2, 1; (RR) round-robin stage; (Q#) qualification round; (P#) preliminary round; (DNQ) did not qualify; (A) absent; (Z#) Davis/Fed Cup Zonal Group (with number indication) or (PO) play-off; (G) gold, (S) silver or (B) bronze Olympic/Paralympic medal; (NMS) not a Masters tournament; (NTI) not a Tier I tournament; (P) postponed; (NH) not held; (SR) strike rate (events won / competed); (W–L) win–loss record.
To avoid confusion and double counting, these charts are updated at the conclusion of a tournament or when the player's participation has ended.

Only main-draw results in WTA Tour, Grand Slam tournaments, Fed Cup/Billie Jean King Cup and Olympic Games are included in win–loss records.

=== Singles ===
Tournament	2005	2006	2007	2008	2009	2010	2011	2012	2013	2014	2015	2016	2017	2018	2019	2020	2021	2022	SR	W–L	Win %
Grand Slam tournaments
Australian Open	A	A	A	1R	2R	2R	QF	A	A	1R	1R	1R	2R	2R	1R	A	1R	1R	0 / 12	8–12	40%
French Open	A	A	2R	A	Q1	2R	QF	A	Q2	SF	3R	2R	1R	3R	3R	1R	1R	2R	0 / 12	19–12	61%
Wimbledon	A	A	Q1	A	Q2	1R	3R	A	2R	3R	3R	2R	1R	2R	1R	NH	2R	1R	0 / 11	10–11	48%
US Open	A	A	2R	A	1R	4R (Note: Petkovic's third-round win at the 2010 US Open was a walkover (so doesn't count as a win).)	QF	1R	1R	3R	3R	2R	1R	1R	3R	A	2R	1R	0 / 14	15–14	52%
Win–loss	0–0	0–0	2–2	0–1	1–2	4–4	14–4	0–1	1–2	9–4	6–4	3–4	1–4	4–4	4–4	0–1	2–4	1–4	0 / 49	52–49	51%
Year-end championships
WTA Elite Trophy	NH				DNQ		A	DNQ		W	RR	DNQ				NH			1 / 2	4–3	57%
National representation
Summer Olympics	NH			A	NH			A	NH			1R	NH				A	NH	0 / 1	0–1	0%
Billie Jean King Cup (Note: Formerly known as Fed Cup until 2020.)	A	A	PO	A	A	1R	PO	PO	A	F	SF	1R	1R	A	1R	A	RR	A	0 / 7	13–11	54%
WTA 1000 + former Tier I tournaments
Dubai / Qatar Open (Note: The first Premier 5 event of the year has switched back and forth between the Dubai Tennis Championships and the Qatar Open since 2009. Dubai was classified as a Premier 5 event from 2009 to 2011 before being succeeded by Doha for the 2012–2014 period. In 2015, Dubai regained its Premier 5 status while Doha was demoted to Premier status. The Premier 5 tournaments were reclassified as WTA 1000 tournaments in 2021.)	NMS			A	A	2R	2R	A	A	1R	2R	SF	A	Q2	A	A	A	1R	0 / 6	6–6	50%
Indian Wells Open	A	A	A	A	Q2	1R	3R	A	Q2	1R	2R	2R	2R	Q2	1R	NH	1R	A	0 / 8	2–8	20%
Miami Open	A	A	A	A	Q1	3R	SF	A	3R	2R	SF	2R	1R	2R	1R	NH	2R	A	0 / 10	15–10	60%
Madrid Open	NH				A	3R	2R	A	Q1	1R	2R	1R	1R	A	Q2	NH	Q1	1R	0 / 7	4–6	40%
Italian Open	A	A	A	A	A	3R	2R	A	A	2R	A	1R	1R	A	Q2	A	Q2	Q2	0 / 5	4–5	44%
Canadian Open	A	A	A	A	Q2	1R	QF	A	A	A	3R	2R	A	A	Q2	NH	A	Q1	0 / 4	6–4	60%
Cincinnati Open	NMS				A	2R	SF	A	2R	1R	3R	2R	Q1	Q1	Q2	A	Q2	Q2	0 / 6	9–6	60%
Pan Pac. / Wuhan Open (Note: In 2014, the Pan Pacific Open was downgraded to a Premier event and replaced by the Wuhan Open. The Premier 5 tournaments were reclassified as WTA 1000 tournaments in 2021.)	A	A	A	A	3R	3R	A	1R	2R	2R	1R	A	1R	A	Q1	NH			0 / 7	6–7	46%
China Open	NMS				Q1	2R	F	1R	3R	3R	3R	A	2R	1R	2R	NH			0 / 9	14–9	61%
German Open	Q1	Q2	1R	A	NH / NMS														0 / 1	0–1	0%
Win–loss	0–0	0–0	0–1	0–0	2–1	11–9	20–8	0–2	6–4	5–8	11–7	6–7	2–6	1–2	1–3	0–0	1–2	0–2	0 / 63	66–62	52%
Career statistics
	2005	2006	2007	2008	2009	2010	2011	2012	2013	2014	2015	2016	2017	2018	2019	2020	2021	2022	SR	W–L	Win %
Tournaments	0	1	4	1	9	24	18	9	14	24	25	20	21	14	19	1	17	12	Career total: 233		
Titles	0	0	0	0	1	0	1	0	0	3	1	0	0	0	0	0	1	0	Career total: 7		
Finals	0	0	0	0	1	1	3	0	2	3	1	0	0	0	0	0	2	0	Career total: 13		
Hard win–loss	0–0	0–1	1–2	0–1	6–6	22–17	35–11	8–8	12–9	19–16	20–18	13–13	10–14	13–9	11–12	0–0	5–11	4–6	2 / 145	179–154	54%
Clay win–loss	0–0	0–0	1–2	0–0	5–2	8–6	17–4	1–2	6–3	19–5	7–3	3–6	1–7	2–4	5–5	0–1	9–4	3–3	5 / 62	87–57	60%
Grass win–loss	0–0	0–0	0–0	0–0	0–0	4–3	2–2	0–0	1–1	3–2	4–3	4–3	1–2	1–1	1–3	0–0	2–3	1–3	0 / 26	24–26	48%
Overall win–loss	0–0	0–1	2–4	0–1	11–8	34–26	54–17	9–10	19–13	41–23	31–24	20–22	12–23	16–14	17–20	0–1	16–18	8–12	7 / 233	290–237	55%
Win (%)	–	0%	33%	0%	58%	57%	76%	47%	59%	64%	56%	48%	34%	53%	46%	0%	47%	40%	Career total: 55%		
Year-end ranking	338	238	100	315	56	32	10	143	39	14	24	56	97	64	79	102	76	141	$8,829,248		

=== Doubles ===
Tournament	2006	2007	2008	2009	2010	2011	2012	2013	2014	2015	2016	2017	2018	2019	2020	2021	2022	SR	W–L
Grand Slam tournaments
Australian Open	A	A	A	A	1R	1R	A	A	2R	1R	1R	QF	1R	1R	A	A	3R	0 / 9	6–9
French Open	A	A	A	A	1R	3R	A	1R	3R	1R	2R	2R	1R	2R	1R	A	1R	0 / 11	7–11
Wimbledon	A	A	A	1R	1R	2R	A	2R	SF	1R	1R	2R	2R	1R	NH	A	2R	0 / 11	9–11
US Open	A	A	A	2R	1R	2R	1R	1R	1R	A	2R	1R	1R	A	A	2R	A	0 / 10	4–10
Win–loss	0–0	0–0	0–0	1–2	0–4	4–4	0–1	1–3	7–4	0–3	2–4	5–4	1–4	1–3	0–1	1–1	3–3	0 / 41	26–41
National representation
Summer Olympics	NH		A	NH			A	NH			1R	NH				A	NH	0 / 1	0–1
Billie Jean King Cup	A	PO	A	A	1R	PO	PO	A	F	SF	1R	1R	A	1R	A	RR	A	0 / 7	2–4
WTA 1000 + former Tier I tournaments
Dubai / Qatar Open	NMS		A	A	A	A	A	A	A	1R	A	A	A	A	A	A	A	0 / 1	0–1
Indian Wells Open	A	A	A	A	A	1R	A	1R	1R	QF	1R	A	A	A	NH	A	A	0 / 5	2–5
Miami Open	A	A	A	A	A	QF	A	A	A	A	A	A	A	A	NH	A	A	0 / 1	2–1
Madrid Open	NH			A	A	A	A	A	1R	A	A	A	A	A	NH	A	A	0 / 1	0–1
Italian Open	A	A	A	A	2R	A	A	A	A	A	A	2R	A	A	A	A	A	0 / 2	2–2
Canadian Open	A	A	A	A	A	2R	A	A	A	A	1R	A	A	A	NH	A	A	0 / 2	1–2
Cincinnati Open	NMS			A	A	1R	A	QF	1R	A	A	A	A	A	A	A	A	0 / 3	2–3
Pan Pac. / Wuhan Open	A	A	A	A	A	A	A	A	QF	A	A	A	A	A	NH			0 / 1	2–1
China Open	NMS			A	A	A	2R	A	A	A	A	A	A	A	NH			0 / 1	1–1
German Open	Q1	1R	A	NH / NMS														0 / 1	0–1
Win–loss	0–0	0–1	0–0	0–0	1–1	3–4	1–1	2–2	2–4	2–2	0–2	1–1	0–0	0–0	0–0	0–0	0–0	0 / 18	12–18
Career statistics
	2006	2007	2008	2009	2010	2011	2012	2013	2014	2015	2016	2017	2018	2019	2020	2021	2022	Career	
Titles	0	0	0	0	0	0	0	0	0	0	0	0	0	0	0	1	0	1	
Finals	0	0	0	1	0	0	0	0	0	0	1	0	0	0	0	1	0	3	
Overall win–loss	0–0	1–2	2–2	9–7	3–11	7–8	4–6	6–8	10–11	4–10	7–10	6–7	2–5	2–5	0–1	7–3	3–4	73–100	
Year-end ranking	–	412	235	84	241	85	230	113	49	147	97	80	280	292	317	132	296	42%	

== Significant finals ==
=== WTA Tournament of Champions ===
==== Singles: 1 (1 title) ====
Result	Year	Tournament	Surface	Opponent	Score
Win	2014	WTA Tournament of Champions, Sofia	Hard (i)	(Italy) Flavia Pennetta	1–6, 6–4, 6–3

=== WTA Premier Mandatory & Premier 5 finals ===
==== Singles: 1 (1 runner-up) ====
Result	Year	Tournament	Surface	Opponent	Score
Loss	2011	China Open	Hard	(Poland) Agnieszka Radwańska	5–7, 6–0, 4–6

== WTA career finals ==
=== Singles: 13 (7 titles, 6 runner-ups) ===
Legend Grand Slam WTA Elite Trophy (1–0) WTA 1000 (0–1) WTA 500 (2–0) WTA 250 (4–5)	Finals by surface Hard (2–3) Grass (0–1) Clay (5–2) Carpet (0–0)

Result	W–L	Date	Tournament	Tier	Surface	Opponent	Score
Win	1–0	Jul 2009	Gastein Ladies, Austria	International (Note: The WTA International tournaments were reclassified as WTA 250 tournaments in 2021.)	Clay	(Romania) Ioana Raluca Olaru	6–2, 6–3
Loss	1–1	Jun 2010	Rosmalen Championships, Netherlands	International	Grass	(Belgium) Justine Henin	6–3, 3–6, 4–6
Loss	1–2	Jan 2011	Brisbane International, Australia	International	Hard	(Czech Republic) Petra Kvitová	1–6, 3–6
Win	2–2	May 2011	Internationaux de Strasbourg, France	International	Clay	(France) Marion Bartoli	6–4, 1–0, ret.
Loss	2–3	Oct 2011	China Open, China	Premier M (Note: The WTA Premier 5 & Mandatory tournaments were reclassified as WTA 1000 tournaments in 2021.)	Hard	(Poland) Agnieszka Radwańska	5–7, 6–0, 4–6
Loss	2–4	Jun 2013	Nuremberg Cup, Germany	International	Clay	(Romania) Simona Halep	3–6, 3–6
Loss	2–5	Aug 2013	Washington Open, United States	International	Hard	(Slovakia) Magdaléna Rybáriková	4–6, 6–7^{(2–7)}
Win	3–5	Apr 2014	Charleston Open, United States	Premier (Note: The WTA Premier tournaments were reclassified as WTA 500 tournaments in 2021.)	Clay	(Slovakia) Jana Čepelová	7–5, 6–2
Win	4–5	Jul 2014	Gastein Ladies, Austria (2)	International	Clay	(United States) Shelby Rogers	6–3, 6–3
Win	5–5	Nov 2014	WTA Tournament of Champions, Bulgaria	Elite Trophy	Hard (i)	(Italy) Flavia Pennetta	1–6, 6–4, 6–3
Win	6–5	Feb 2015	Antwerp Diamond Games, Belgium	Premier	Hard (i)	(Spain) Carla Suárez Navarro	walkover
Loss	6–6	Jul 2021	Hamburg European Open, Germany	WTA 250	Clay	(Romania) Elena-Gabriela Ruse	6–7^{(6–8)}, 4–6
Win	7–6	Aug 2021	Cluj-Napoca Open, Romania	WTA 250	Clay	(Egypt) Mayar Sherif	6–1, 6–1

=== Doubles: 3 (1 title, 2 runner-ups) ===
Legend Grand Slam WTA 1000 WTA 500 (1–1) WTA 250 (0–1)	Finals by surface Hard (1–1) Grass (0–0) Clay (0–1) Carpet (0–0)

Result	W–L	Date	Tournament	Tier	Surface	Partner	Opponents	Score
Loss	0–1	Jul 2009	Gastein Ladies, Austria	International	Clay	(Germany) Tatjana Maria	(Czech Republic) Andrea Hlaváčková (Czech Republic) Lucie Hradecká	2–6, 4–6
Loss	0–2	Jan 2016	Brisbane International, Australia	Premier	Hard	(Germany) Angelique Kerber	(Switzerland) Martina Hingis (India) Sania Mirza	5–7, 1–6
Win	1–2	Oct 2021	Chicago Fall Classic, United States	WTA 500	Hard	(Czech Republic) Květa Peschke	(United States) Caroline Dolehide (United States) CoCo Vandeweghe	6–3, 6–1

=== Team competition: 1 (1 runner-up) ===
Result	Date	Tournament	Surface	Partners	Opponents	Score
Loss	Nov 2014	Fed Cup, Czech Republic	Hard (i)	(Germany) Angelique Kerber (Germany) Sabine Lisicki (Germany) Julia Görges	(Czech Republic) Petra Kvitová (Czech Republic) Lucie Šafářová (Czech Republic) Lucie Hradecká (Czech Republic) Andrea Hlaváčková	1–3

== ITF career finals ==
=== Singles: 13 (9 titles, 4 runner–ups) ===
Legend
$100,000 tournaments (2–0)
$80,000 tournaments (0–0)
$60,000 tournaments (1–2)
$25,000 tournaments (2–2)
$10,000 tournaments (4–0)

Result	W–L	Date	Tournament	Tier	Surface	Opponent	Score
Win	1–0	May 2004	ITF Antalya, Turkey	10,000	Clay	(Ukraine) Kateryna Avdiyenko	6–3, 6–4
Win	2–0	Jun 2004	ITF Podgorica, Serbia and Montenegro	10,000	Clay	(Serbia and Montenegro) Danica Krstajić	6–1, 6–3
Win	3–0	Jun 2005	ITF Davos, Switzerland	10,000	Clay	(Czech Republic) Janette Bejlková	6–4, 6–2
Win	4–0	Sep 2005	ITF Alphen aan den Rijn, Netherlands	10,000	Clay	(Netherlands) Eva Pera	7–5, 7–5
Loss	4–1	Sep 2006	ITF Alphen aan den Rijn, Netherlands	25,000	Clay	(New Zealand) Marina Erakovic	6–4, 2–6, 5–7
Win	5–1	Sep 2006	ITF Sofia, Bulgaria	25,000	Clay	(Romania) Simona Matei	7–5, 7–5
Loss	5–2	Apr 2007	ITF Torrent, Spain	50,000 (Note: The $50,000 ITF tournaments were reclassified as $60,000 in 2017.)	Clay	(Romania) Ioana Raluca Olaru	4–6, 7–5, 4–6
Win	6–2	Jul 2007	ITF Contrexéville, France	50,000	Clay	(Belarus) Ksenia Milevskaya	6–2, 6–0
Win	7–2	Oct 2008	ITF Istanbul, Turkey	25,000	Hard	(Greece) Anna Gerasimou	6–2, 6–2
Loss	7–3	Apr 2009	ITF Latina, Italy	50,000	Clay	(Germany) Julia Schruff	5–7, 6–7^{(0–7)}
Loss	7–4	Apr 2009	ITF Civitavecchia, Italy	25,000	Clay	(Slovenia) Polona Hercog	2–6, 4–6
Win	8–4	May 2009	ITF Bucharest, Romania	100,000	Clay	(Switzerland) Stefanie Vögele	6–3, 6–2
Win	9–4	Jun 2013	ITF Marseille, France	100,000	Clay	(Spain) Anabel Medina Garrigues	6–4, 6–2

=== Doubles: 5 (3 titles, 2 runner–ups) ===
Legend
$100,000 tournaments (0–0)
$80,000 tournaments (0–0)
$60,000 tournaments (1–0)
$25,000 tournaments (0–1)
$10,000 tournaments (2–1)

Result	W–L	Date	Tournament	Tier	Surface	Partner	Opponents	Score
Win	1–0	Jun 2004	ITF Podgorica, Serbia and Montenegro	10,000	Clay	(Russia) Sofia Avakova	(Serbia and Montenegro) Ljiljana Nanušević (Serbia and Montenegro) Marta Simić	6–3 ret.
Loss	1–1	Jun 2005	ITF Buchen, Germany	10,000	Hard (i)	(Germany) Korina Perkovic	(Bosnia and Herzegovina) Mervana Jugić-Salkić (Croatia) Darija Jurak	2–6, 2–6
Win	2–1	Jun 2005	ITF Davos, Switzerland	10,000	Clay	(Czech Republic) Zuzana Hejdová	(Czech Republic) Petra Cetkovská (Bosnia and Herzegovina) Sandra Martinović	6–3, 6–2
Loss	2–2	Jul 2007	ITF Padova, Italy	25,000	Clay	(Germany) Vanessa Henke	(Estonia) Maret Ani (New Zealand) Marina Erakovic	4–6, 4–6
Win	3–2	Sep 2008	ITF Maribor, Slovenia	50,000	Clay	(Germany) Carmen Klaschka	(Hungary) Kira Nagy (Belarus) Anastasiya Yakimova	6–3, 6–2

== Top 10 wins ==
Petkovic has a 15–41 record against players who were, at the time the match was played, ranked in the top 10.

Season	2009	2010	2011	2012	2013	2014	2015	2016	2017	2018	2019	2020	2021	2022	Total
Wins	1	0	7	0	1	0	1	1	0	2	1	0	0	1	15

#	Player	Rank	Event	Surface	Round	Score	AP Rank
2009
1.	(Russia) Svetlana Kuznetsova	No. 6	Pan Pacific Open, Japan	Hard	2R	7–5, 4–6, 6–3	No. 58
2011
2.	(United States) Venus Williams	No. 5	Australian Open	Hard	3R	1–0 ret.	No. 30
3.	(Denmark) Caroline Wozniacki	No. 1	Miami Open, United States	Hard	4R	7–5, 3–6, 6–3	No. 21
4.	(Serbia) Jelena Janković	No. 7	Miami Open, United States	Hard	QF	2–6, 6–2, 6–4	No. 21
5.	(Serbia) Jelena Janković	No. 6	Stuttgart Open, Germany	Clay (i)	2R	3–6, 6–1, 6–3	No. 19
6.	(Czech Republic) Petra Kvitová	No. 7	Canadian Open	Hard	3R	6–1, 6–2	No. 11
7.	(Czech Republic) Petra Kvitová	No. 6	Cincinnati Open, United States	Hard	3R	6–3, 6–3	No. 11
8.	(France) Marion Bartoli	No. 10	China Open	Hard	3R	4–6, 6–4, 7–5	No. 11
2013
9.	(Belarus) Victoria Azarenka	No. 2	China Open	Hard	1R	6–4, 2–6, 6–4	No. 43
2015
10.	(Russia) Ekaterina Makarova	No. 9	Miami Open, United States	Hard	4R	6–1, 7–5	No. 10
2016
11.	(Spain) Garbiñe Muguruza	No. 5	Qatar Open	Hard	QF	6–1, 5–7, 6–2	No. 27
2018
12.	(United States) Sloane Stephens	No. 3	Citi Open, United States	Hard	2R	2–6, 6–4, 6–2	No. 91
13.	(Germany) Julia Görges	No. 9	Linz Open, Austria	Hard (i)	1R	1–6, 7–5, 6–4	No. 82
2019
14.	(Czech Republic) Petra Kvitová	No. 6	US Open	Hard	2R	6–4, 6–4	No. 88
2022
15.	(Spain) Garbiñe Muguruza	No. 10	German Open	Grass	1R	7–6^{(10–8)}, 6–4	No. 59

== Billie Jean King Cup performance ==
Group membership	2007	2008	2009	2010	2011	2012	2013	2014	2015	2016	2017	2018	2019	2020–21	2022	W–L
World Group / Finals	NP	A	NP	1R	NP	A	NP	F	SF	1R	1R	A	1R	RR	NP	5–11
WG Play-offs / Qualifiers	A	A	A	PO	PO	PO	A	NP		PO	A	NP	PO	A	A	7–4
World Group II	G2	NP	A	NP	G2	NP	A	not participating / discontinued								3–0
Singles win–loss	0–0	0–0	0–0	2–2	4–0	0–1	0–0	2–1	3–0	1–2	0–2	0–0	1–1	0–2	0–0	13–11
Doubles win–loss	1–0	0–0	0–0	0–1	0–0	1–0	0–0	0–0	0–1	0–1	0–0	0–0	0–1	0–0	0–0	2–4
Overall win–loss	1–0	0–0	0–0	2–3	4–0	1–1	0–0	2–1	3–1	1–3	0–2	0–0	1–2	0–2	0–0	15–15

Note: Levels of Fed Cup in which Germany did not compete in a particular year are marked "not participating" or "NP".
