= 2009 Gastein Ladies – Doubles =

Doubles
- 2009 Gastein Ladies

Final
- Champions: (Czech Republic) Andrea Hlaváčková; (Czech Republic) Lucie Hradecká
- Runners-up: (Germany) Tatjana Malek; (Germany) Andrea Petkovic
- Score: 6–2, 6–4

Details
- Draw: 16
- Seeds: 4

Events
Singles	Doubles
- Gastein Ladies

Andrea Hlaváčková and Lucie Hradecká were the defending champions, and won in the final, 6–2, 6–4, against Tatjana Malek and Andrea Petkovic.

== Seeds ==
1. (Czech Republic) Iveta Benešová / (Czech Republic) Barbora Záhlavová-Strýcová (quarterfinals, withdrew)
2. (Turkey) İpek Şenoğlu / (Kazakhstan) Yaroslava Shvedova (first round)
3. (Czech Republic) Andrea Hlaváčková / (Czech Republic) Lucie Hradecká (champions)
4. (Ukraine) Mariya Koryttseva / (Romania) Ioana Raluca Olaru (semifinals)

== Draw ==
Key

- Q = Qualifier
- WC = Wild card
- LL = Lucky loser
- Alt = Alternate
- ITF = ITF entry
- PR = Protected ranking
- SR = Special ranking
- SE = Special exempt
- JE = Junior exempt
- JR = Junior Accelerator Programme entrant
- CO = College Accelerator Programme entrant
- NG = Next Gen Accelerator Program entrant
- w/o = Walkover
- r = Retired
- d = Defaulted

=== Draw ===
First round

Quarterfinals

Semifinals

Final

1
- (Czech Republic) I Benešová
- (Czech Republic) B Záhlavová-Strýcová
6
6

- (Argentina) E Krauth
- (Sweden) H Nooni
1
1

1
- (Czech Republic) I Benešová
- (Czech Republic) B Záhlavová-Strýcová

- (France) A Cornet
- (Germany) A-L Grönefeld
4
4

- (United Kingdom) S Borwell
- (Canada) S Fichman
w/o

- (United Kingdom) S Borwell
- (Canada) S Fichman
6
6

- (United Kingdom) S Borwell
- (Canada) S Fichman
2
6
[7]

3
- (Czech Republic) A Hlaváčková
- (Czech Republic) L Hradecká
6
6

3
- (Czech Republic) A Hlaváčková
- (Czech Republic) L Hradecká
6
4
[10]

- (Austria) S Klemenschits
- (Austria) Y Meusburger
3
3

3
- (Czech Republic) A Hlaváčková
- (Czech Republic) L Hradecká
5
7
[10]

WC
- (Austria) M Klaffner
- (Latvia) A Sevastova
2
6^{5}

- (Germany) S Klösel
- (Slovakia) L Tvarošková
7
5
[7]

- (Germany) S Klösel
- (Slovakia) L Tvarošková
6
7

3
- (Czech Republic) A Hlaváčková
- (Czech Republic) L Hradecká
6
6

- (Poland) M Domachowska
- (South Africa) N Grandin
6
6

- (Germany) T Malek
- (Germany) A Petkovic
2
4

- (Russia) M Kondratieva
- (France) S Lefèvre
1
1

- (Poland) M Domachowska
- (South Africa) N Grandin
2
4

- (South Africa) K Anderson
- (Georgia (country)) M Chakhnashvili
0
4

4
- (Ukraine) M Koryttseva
- (Romania) IR Olaru
6
6

4
- (Ukraine) M Koryttseva
- (Romania) IR Olaru
6
6

4
- (Ukraine) M Koryttseva
- (Romania) IR Olaru
2
1

- (Poland) O Brózda
- (Poland) M Kiszczyńska
7
7

- (Germany) T Malek
- (Germany) A Petkovic
6
6

- (Russia) A Jidkova
- (Germany) C Klaschka
5
6^{5}

- (Poland) O Brózda
- (Poland) M Kiszczyńska
2
4

- (Germany) T Malek
- (Germany) A Petkovic
4
7
[10]

- (Germany) T Malek
- (Germany) A Petkovic
6
6

2
- (Turkey) İ Şenoğlu
- (Kazakhstan) Y Shvedova
6
5
[6]
