= 2011 Internationaux de Strasbourg =

- Date: 16–22 May
- Edition: 25th
- Category: WTA International
- Draw: 32S / 16D
- Prize money: $220,000
- Surface: Clay
- Location: Strasbourg, France
- Venue: Tennis Club de Strasbourg

Champions

Singles
- (Germany) Andrea Petkovic

Doubles
- (Uzbekistan) Akgul Amanmuradova / (Chinese Taipei) Chuang Chia-jung
- Internationaux de Strasbourg

The 2011 Internationaux de Strasbourg was a professional tennis tournament played on clay courts. It was the 25th edition of the tournament which was part of the 2011 WTA Tour. It took place in Strasbourg, France between 16 May and 22 May 2011. Second-seeded Andrea Petkovic won the singles title.

== Finals ==
=== Singles ===
(Germany) Andrea Petkovic defeated (France) Marion Bartoli, 6–4, 1–0 ret.

- It was Petkovic's 1st singles title of the year and the 2nd of her career.

=== Doubles ===
(Uzbekistan) Akgul Amanmuradova / (Chinese Taipei) Chuang Chia-jung defeated (South Africa) Natalie Grandin / (Czech Republic) Vladimíra Uhlířová, 6–4, 5–7, [10–2]

== WTA entrants ==
=== Seeds ===
| Country | Player | Rank^{1} | Seed |
|---|---|---|---|
| FRA | Marion Bartoli | 12 | 1 |
| GER | Andrea Petkovic | 15 | 2 |
| SRB | ~~Ana Ivanovic~~ | ~~22~~ | ~~3~~ |
| RUS | Nadia Petrova | 27 | 4 |
| RUS | Maria Kirilenko | 30 | 5 |
| SVK | Daniela Hantuchová | 33 | 6 |
| ESP | Anabel Medina Garrigues | 42 | 7 |
| CZE | Lucie Hradecká | 45 | 8 |

- Rankings are as of May 9, 2011.

=== Other entrants ===
The following players received wildcards into the singles main draw:

- (France) Alizé Cornet
- ~~(Serbia) Ana Ivanovic~~
- (France) Pauline Parmentier
- (Russia) Nadia Petrova

The following players received entry from the qualifying draw:

- (France) Stéphanie Foretz Gacon
- (Germany) Anna-Lena Grönefeld
- (Croatia) Mirjana Lučić
- (United States) Ahsha Rolle

The following players received entry from a lucky loser spot:

- (United States) Christina McHale
