= 2014 Garanti Koza WTA Tournament of Champions – Singles =

Singles
- 2014 Garanti Koza WTA Tournament of Champions

Final
- Champion: (Germany) Andrea Petkovic
- Runner-up: (Italy) Flavia Pennetta
- Score: 1–6, 6–4, 6–3

Details
- Draw: 8

Events
Singles
← 2013 ·	WTA Tournament of Champions

Simona Halep was the defending champion, but did not participate since she qualified for the WTA Finals.

Andrea Petkovic won the tournament, defeating Flavia Pennetta in the final, 1–6, 6–4, 6–3.

== Players ==
1. (Russia) Ekaterina Makarova (round robin, withdrew)
2. (Slovakia) Dominika Cibulková (round robin)
3. (Italy) Flavia Pennetta (final)
4. (Germany) Andrea Petkovic (champion)
5. (Spain) Carla Suárez Navarro (semifinals)
6. (France) Alizé Cornet (round robin)
7. (Spain) Garbiñe Muguruza (semifinals)
8. (Bulgaria) Tsvetana Pironkova (round robin)

== Alternates ==
1. (Czech Republic) Karolína Plíšková (round robin)
2. (Ukraine) Elina Svitolina (Did not play)

== Draw ==
Key

- Q = Qualifier
- WC = Wild card
- LL = Lucky loser
- Alt = Alternate
- ITF = ITF entry
- PR = Protected ranking
- SR = Special ranking
- SE = Special exempt
- JE = Junior exempt
- JR = Junior Accelerator Programme entrant
- CO = College Accelerator Programme entrant
- NG = Next Gen Accelerator Program entrant
- w/o = Walkover
- r = Retired
- d = Defaulted

=== Finals ===
Semifinals
7	(Spain) Garbiñe Muguruza	1	4
4	(Germany) Andrea Petkovic	6	6
5	(Spain) Carla Suárez Navarro	4	2
3/WC	(Italy) Flavia Pennetta	6	6

Final
4	(Germany) Andrea Petkovic	1	6	6
3/WC	(Italy) Flavia Pennetta	6	4	3

=== Serdika group ===
		(Russia) Makarova (Czech Republic) Plíšková	(Italy) Pennetta	(France) Cornet	(Spain) Muguruza	RR W–L	Set W–L	Game W–L	Standings
1 Alt	(Russia) Ekaterina Makarova (Czech Republic) Karolína Plíšková		(w/ Plíšková); 1–6, 3–6	1–6, 4–6 (w/ Makarova)	2–6, 1–6 (w/ Makarova)	0–2; 0–1	0–4 (0.0%); 0–2 (0.0%)	8–24 (25.0%); 4–12 (25.0%)	X 4
3/WC	(Italy) Flavia Pennetta	6–1, 6–3 (w/ Plíšková)		6–1, 6–2	6–0, 1–6, 1–6	2–1	5–2 (71.4%)	32–19 (62.7%)	2
6	(France) Alizé Cornet	6–1, 6–4 (w/ Makarova)	1–6, 2–6		3–6, 5–7	1–2	2–4 (33.3%)	23–30 (43.3%)	3
7	(Spain) Garbiñe Muguruza	6–2, 6–1 (w/ Makarova)	0–6, 6–1, 6–1	6–3, 7–5		3–0	6–1 (85.7%)	37–19 (66.1%)	1

Standings are determined by: 1. number of wins; 2. number of matches; 3. in two-players-ties, head-to-head records; 4. in three-players-ties, percentage of sets won, or of games won; 5. steering-committee decision.

=== Sredets group ===
		(Slovakia) Cibulková	(Germany) Petkovic	(Spain) Suárez Navarro	(Bulgaria) Pironkova	RR W–L	Set W–L	Game W–L	Standings
2	(Slovakia) Dominika Cibulková		5–7, 3–6	7–5, 6–4	6–3, 7–6^{(8–6)}	2–1	4–2 (66.7%)	34–31 (52.3%)	3
4	(Germany) Andrea Petkovic	7–5, 6–3		0–6, 4–6	7–5, 6–2	2–1	4–2 (66.7%)	30–27 (52.6%)	2
5	(Spain) Carla Suárez Navarro	5–7, 4–6	6–0, 6–4		7–6^{(7–2)}, 6–1	2–1	4–2 (66.7%)	34–24 (58.6%)	1
8/WC	(Bulgaria) Tsvetana Pironkova	3–6, 6–7^{(6–8)}	5–7, 2–6	6–7^{(2–7)}, 1–6		0–3	0–6 (0.0%)	23–39 (37.1%)	4

Standings are determined by: 1. number of wins; 2. number of matches; 3. in two-players-ties, head-to-head records; 4. in three-players-ties, percentage of sets won, or of games won; 5. steering-committee decision.
