= 2009 Gastein Ladies – Singles =

Singles
- 2009 Gastein Ladies

Final
- Champion: (Germany) Andrea Petkovic
- Runner-up: (Romania) Ioana Raluca Olaru
- Score: 6–2, 6–3

Details
- Draw: 32
- Seeds: 8

Events
Singles	Doubles
← 2008 ·	Gastein Ladies	· 2010 →

Pauline Parmentier was the defending champion, but she was defeated in the second round by Magdaléna Rybáriková.

Andrea Petkovic won in the final, 6–2, 6–3, against Ioana Raluca Olaru.

== Seeds ==
1. (France) Alizé Cornet (semifinals)
2. (Italy) Francesca Schiavone (withdrew due to a back injury )
3. (Austria) Sybille Bammer (second round)
4. (Czech Republic) Iveta Benešová (second round, retired)
5. (Spain) Carla Suárez Navarro (first round)
6. (Slovakia) Magdaléna Rybáriková (quarterfinals)
7. (Germany) Anna-Lena Grönefeld (quarterfinals)
8. (Czech Republic) Lucie Hradecká (first round)
9. (Israel) Shahar Pe'er (second round)

== Draw ==
=== Key ===
- Q = Qualifier
- WC = Wild card
- LL = Lucky loser
- Alt = Alternate
- SE = Special exempt
- PR = Protected ranking
- ITF = ITF entry
- JE = Junior exempt
- w/o = Walkover
- r = Retired
- d = Defaulted
- SR = Special ranking

=== Finals ===
Semifinals
1	(France) Alizé Cornet	6	5	3
(Romania) Ioana Raluca Olaru	3	7	6
(Germany) Andrea Petkovic	6	6
(Kazakhstan) Yaroslava Shvedova	2	1

Final
(Romania) Ioana Raluca Olaru	2	3
(Germany) Andrea Petkovic	6	6

=== Top half ===
First round
1	(France) A Cornet	4	7	6
(Colombia) M Duque Marino	6	6^{3}	4
(Spain) L Domínguez Lino	3	3
(Austria) P Mayr	6	6
(Czech Republic) B Záhlavová-Strýcová	6	2	6
(Czech Republic) S Záhlavová	1	6	4
(Spain) N Llagostera Vives	6	6
8	(Czech Republic) L Hradecká	2	2
3	(Austria) S Bammer	7	6
LL	(Italy) N Viérin	5	4
(Poland) M Domachowska	7	4	3
(Romania) IR Olaru	5	6	6
(France) P Parmentier	6	6
Q	(Germany) C Klaschka	1	1
(Ukraine) M Koryttseva	3	1
6	(Slovakia) M Rybáriková	6	6

Second round
1	(France) A Cornet	3	6	6
(Austria) P Mayr	6	4	1
(Czech Republic) B Záhlavová-Strýcová	6	6
(Spain) N Llagostera Vives	0	3
3	(Austria) S Bammer	6	2	1
(Romania) IR Olaru	4	6	6
(France) P Parmentier	3	6	4
6	(Slovakia) M Rybáriková	6	4	6

Quarterfinals
1	(France) A Cornet	6	2	6
(Czech Republic) B Záhlavová-Strýcová	4	6	2
(Romania) IR Olaru	6	6
6	(Slovakia) M Rybáriková	4	4

Semifinals
1	(France) A Cornet	6	5	3
(Romania) IR Olaru	3	7	6

=== Bottom half ===
First round
7	(Germany) A-L Grönefeld	6	6
Q	(Czech Republic) Z Ondrášková	4	3
WC	(Austria) M Klaffner	4	6	4
LL	(Czech Republic) T Hladíková	6	2	6
(Germany) S Klösel	4	3
(Germany) A Petkovic	6	6
(Romania) A Dulgheru	6^{5}	3
4	(Czech Republic) I Benešová	7	6
5	(Spain) C Suárez Navarro	6	2	4
(Germany) T Malek	2	6	6
WC	(Austria) Y Meusburger	6	6
Q	(Canada) S Fichman	4	3
(Kazakhstan) Y Shvedova	6	6
Q	(Slovakia) L Juríková	1	0
WC	(Austria) T Schiechtl	4	3
9	(Israel) S Pe'er	6	6

Second round
7	(Germany) A-L Grönefeld	6	6
LL	(Czech Republic) T Hladíková	3	2
(Germany) A Petkovic	6
4	(Czech Republic) I Benešová	1	r
(Germany) T Malek	2	6	4
WC	(Austria) Y Meusburger	6	2	6
(Kazakhstan) Y Shvedova	6	6
9	(Israel) S Pe'er	2	1

Quarterfinals
7	(Germany) A-L Grönefeld	7	3	1
(Germany) A Petkovic	6^{6}	6	6
WC	(Austria) Y Meusburger	2	3
(Kazakhstan) Y Shvedova	6	6

Semifinals
(Germany) A Petkovic	6	6
(Kazakhstan) Y Shvedova	2	1
