= Zoran Petković =

Bosnian-born tennis coach and former player

- Country (sports): Yugoslavia
- Residence: Darmstadt, Germany
- Born: 1960 (age 65–66) Tuzla, SR Bosnia and Herzegovina, SFR Yugoslavia
- Plays: Right-handed

Singles
- Career record: 1–1

Doubles
- Career record: 0–0

Team competitions
- Davis Cup: 1–1
Medal record
Mediterranean Games
Silver medal – second place	1979 Split	Doubles

Zoran Petković (Serbian Cyrillic: Зоран Петковић) is a Bosnia-born tennis coach and former professional ATP player who competed for Yugoslavia. He is an ethnic Serb.

== Career ==
Petković won a doubles silver medal at the 1979 Mediterranean Games partnering with Zoltan Ilin. In the early 1980s he took part in two Davis Cup ties for Yugoslavia; he lost a dead rubber to former World No. 1 Romania's Ilie Năstase in straight sets in 1980.

Also in the early 1980s, he played college tennis for the South Carolina Gamecocks men's tennis.

== Personal life ==
His older daughter is German tennis player Andrea Petkovic, whom he has coached in the past.
