= 2009 Gastein Ladies =

- Date: 20–26 July
- Edition: 3rd
- Category: WTA International
- Draw: 32S / 16D
- Prize money: $220,000
- Surface: Clay - outdoor
- Location: Bad Gastein, Austria

Champions

Singles
- (Germany) Andrea Petkovic

Doubles
- (Czech Republic) Andrea Hlaváčková / (Czech Republic) Lucie Hradecká
- Gastein Ladies

The 2009 Gastein Ladies was a women's tennis tournament played on outdoor clay courts. It was the 3rd edition of the Gastein Ladies, and was part of the WTA International tournaments of the 2009 WTA Tour. It was held in Bad Gastein, Austria, from 20 July until 26 July 2009. Unseeded Andrea Petkovic won the singles title.

== Finals ==
=== Singles ===
(Germany) Andrea Petkovic defeated (Romania) Ioana Raluca Olaru, 6–2, 6–3

- It was Petkovic's only singles title of the year and the 1st of her career.

=== Doubles ===
(Czech Republic) Andrea Hlaváčková / (Czech Republic) Lucie Hradecká defeated (Germany) Tatjana Malek / (Germany) Andrea Petkovic, 6–2, 6–4

== WTA entrants ==
=== Seeds ===
Player	Nationality	Ranking*	Seeding
Alizé Cornet	France	28	1
Francesca Schiavone	Italy	30	2
Sybille Bammer	Austria	31	3
Iveta Benešová	Czech Republic	32	4
Carla Suárez Navarro	Spain	33	5
Magdaléna Rybáriková	Slovakia	48	6
Anna-Lena Grönefeld	Germany	54	7
Lucie Hradecká	Czech Republic	56	8
Shahar Pe'er	Israel	62	9

- Seedings are based on the rankings of July 13, 2009.
- Francesca Schiavone withdrew due to a back injury, so Shahar Peer became the No. 9 seed.

=== Other entrants ===
The following players received wildcards into the singles main draw

- (Austria) Melanie Klaffner
- (Austria) Yvonne Meusburger
- (Austria) Tina Schiechtl

The following players received entry from the qualifying draw:

- (Czech Republic) Zuzana Ondrášková
- (Slovakia) Lenka Juríková
- (Canada) Sharon Fichman
- (Germany) Carmen Klaschka

The following player received the lucky loser spot:

- (Czech Republic) Tereza Hladiková
