= 2011 Internationaux de Strasbourg – Singles =

Singles
- 2011 Internationaux de Strasbourg

Final
- Champion: (Germany) Andrea Petkovic
- Runner-up: (France) Marion Bartoli
- Score: 6–4, 1–0 ret.

Details
- Seeds: 8

Events
Singles	Doubles
- Internationaux de Strasbourg

Maria Sharapova was the defending champion, but chose not to participate.

Andrea Petkovic won the title, after Marion Bartoli retired in the final with the scoreline at 6–4, 1–0.

== Seeds ==
1. (France) Marion Bartoli (final, retired due to thigh injury)
2. (Germany) Andrea Petkovic (champion)
3. (Serbia) Ana Ivanovic (withdrew due to left wrist injury)
4. (Russia) Nadia Petrova (quarterfinals)
5. (Russia) Maria Kirilenko (quarterfinals)
6. (Slovakia) Daniela Hantuchová (semifinals)
7. (Spain) Anabel Medina Garrigues (semifinals)
8. (Czech Republic) Lucie Hradecká (quarterfinals)

== Draw ==
Key

- Q = Qualifier
- WC = Wild card
- LL = Lucky loser
- Alt = Alternate
- ITF = ITF entry
- PR = Protected ranking
- SR = Special ranking
- SE = Special exempt
- JE = Junior exempt
- JR = Junior Accelerator Programme entrant
- CO = College Accelerator Programme entrant
- NG = Next Gen Accelerator Program entrant
- w/o = Walkover
- r = Retired
- d = Defaulted

=== Finals ===
Semifinals
1	(France) Marion Bartoli	6	6
7	(Spain) Anabel Medina Garrigues	1	2
6	(Slovakia) Daniela Hantuchová	4	6	4
2	(Germany) Andrea Petkovic	6	3	6

Final
1	(France) Marion Bartoli	4	0^{r}
2	(Germany) Andrea Petkovic	6	1

=== Top half ===
First round
1	(France) M Bartoli	6	6
(Japan) K Date-Krumm	2	1
(United Kingdom) E Baltacha	6
(Slovakia) M Rybáriková	3^{r}
Q	(France) S Foretz Gacon	6	6
(Ukraine) A Bondarenko	4	1
Q	(United States) A Rolle	3	4
8	(Czech Republic) L Hradecká	6	6
LL	(United States) C McHale	5	6^{7}
Q	(Croatia) M Lučić	7	7
(Australia) J Dokić	6	6
(Romania) S Halep	2	1
(Russia) A Kudryavtseva	6^{3}	3
(Serbia) B Jovanovski	7	6
(United States) M Oudin	3	1
7	(Spain) A Medina Garrigues	6	6

Second round
1	(France) M Bartoli	w/o
(United Kingdom) E Baltacha
Q	(France) S Foretz Gacon	2	4
8	(Czech Republic) L Hradecká	6	6
Q	(Croatia) M Lučić	6	6
(Australia) J Dokić	2	2
(Serbia) B Jovanovski	2	0
7	(Spain) A Medina Garrigues	6	6

Quarterfinals
1	(France) M Bartoli	6	6
8	(Czech Republic) L Hradecká	2	3
Q	(Croatia) M Lučić	4	4
7	(Spain) A Medina Garrigues	6	6

Semifinals
1	(France) M Bartoli	6	6
7	(Spain) A Medina Garrigues	1	2

=== Bottom half ===
First round
6	(Slovakia) D Hantuchová	6	6
(Sweden) J Larsson	3	4
(Uzbekistan) A Amanmuradova	1	1
(France) M Johansson	6	6
(India) S Mirza	4	6	1
WC	(France) A Cornet	6	4	6
(Canada) R Marino	6^{4}	3
4/WC	(Russia) N Petrova	7	6
5	(Russia) M Kirilenko	6	6
(Germany) K Barrois	2	3
(Germany) A Kerber	4	2
(Spain) L Pous Tió	6	6
WC	(France) P Parmentier	2	4
(China) S Zhang	6	6
Q	(Germany) A-L Grönefeld	3	1
2	(Germany) A Petkovic	6	6

Second round
6	(Slovakia) D Hantuchová	6	6
(France) M Johansson	4	2
WC	(France) A Cornet	6	2	2
4/WC	(Russia) N Petrova	2	6	6
5	(Russia) M Kirilenko	6	3	7
(Spain) L Pous Tió	3	6	6^{5}
(China) S Zhang	1	3
2	(Germany) A Petkovic	6	6

Quarterfinals
6	(Slovakia) D Hantuchová	6	6
4/WC	(Russia) N Petrova	4	2
5	(Russia) M Kirilenko	4	3
2	(Germany) A Petkovic	6	6

Semifinals
6	(Slovakia) D Hantuchová	4	6	4
2	(Germany) A Petkovic	6	3	6

== Qualifying ==
=== Seeds ===
1. (India) Sania Mirza (moved to Main Draw)
2. (United States) Christina McHale (qualifying competition) (Lucky loser)
3. (Croatia) Mirjana Lučić (qualified)
4. (Ukraine) Kateryna Bondarenko (qualifying competition)
5. (France) Stéphanie Foretz Gacon (qualified)
6. (Turkey) Çağla Büyükakçay (first round)
7. (Italy) Anna Floris (qualifying competition)
8. (France) Laura Thorpe (first round)
9. (Germany) Anna-Lena Grönefeld (qualified)

=== Qualifiers ===
1. (Germany) Anna-Lena Grönefeld
2. (United States) Ahsha Rolle
3. (Croatia) Mirjana Lučić
4. (France) Stéphanie Foretz Gacon

=== Qualifying draw ===
==== First qualifier ====
First round
9	(Germany) Anna-Lena Grönefeld	6	6
(Germany) Karolina Nowak	1	0
WC	(France) Elixane Lechemia	6^{4}	1
(China) Xu Yifan	7	6
(Portugal) Maria João Koehler	3	7	6
(Poland) Katarzyna Piter	6	5	4
Alt	(Greece) Stamatia Fafaliou	1	1
7	(Italy) Anna Floris	6	6

Second round
9	(Germany) Anna-Lena Grönefeld	6	6
(China) Xu Yifan	2	1
(Portugal) Maria João Koehler	3	6	1
7	(Italy) Anna Floris	6	3	6

Qualifying competition
9	(Germany) Anna-Lena Grönefeld	6	6
7	(Italy) Anna Floris	0	2

==== Second qualifier ====
First round
2	(United States) Christina McHale	6	3	6
(Germany) Sina Haas	2	6	4
PR	(Ukraine) Viktoriya Kutuzova	4	6	6
WC	(Germany) Christina Shakovets	6	3	3
(Brazil) Ana-Clara Duarte	6	6
WC	(France) Ana-Maria Zubori	2	2
(United States) Ahsha Rolle	5	7	6
6	(Turkey) Çağla Büyükakçay	7	6^{2}	3

Second round
2	(United States) Christina McHale	6	7
PR	(Ukraine) Viktoriya Kutuzova	3	6^{4}
(Brazil) Ana-Clara Duarte	2	1
(United States) Ahsha Rolle	6	6

Qualifying competition
2	(United States) Christina McHale	5	6	3
(United States) Ahsha Rolle	7	3	6

==== Third qualifier ====
First round
3	(Croatia) Mirjana Lučić	6	7
(Switzerland) Conny Perrin	3	6^{3}
(Australia) Jessica Moore	6	6
(Austria) Melanie Klaffner	0	1
(United States) Gail Brodsky	7	6
(United States) Mashona Washington	6^{3}	4
(France) Kristina Mladenovic	6	6
8	(France) Laura Thorpe	3	2

Second round
3	(Croatia) Mirjana Lučić	6	6
(Australia) Jessica Moore	2	2
(United States) Gail Brodsky	7	7
(France) Kristina Mladenovic	5	6^{5}

Qualifying competition
3	(Croatia) Mirjana Lučić	6	6^{3}	6
(United States) Gail Brodsky	1	7	4

==== Fourth qualifier ====
First round
4	(Ukraine) Kateryna Bondarenko	6	6
(Australia) Karolina Wlodarczak	1	4
(Australia) Daniella Dominikovic	4	4
WC	(France) Victoria Muntean	6	6
(China) Sun Shengnan	2	1
(Australia) Johanna Konta	6	6
(Bulgaria) Dia Evtimova	6^{5}	6	4
5	(France) Stéphanie Foretz Gacon	7	3	6

Second round
4	(Ukraine) Kateryna Bondarenko	6	6
WC	(France) Victoria Muntean	0	0
(Australia) Johanna Konta	3	1
5	(France) Stéphanie Foretz Gacon	6	6

Qualifying competition
4	(Ukraine) Kateryna Bondarenko	3	7	2
5	(France) Stéphanie Foretz Gacon	6	6^{7}	6
