= 2014 Garanti Koza WTA Tournament of Champions =

- Date: 28 October – 2 November
- Edition: 6th
- Category: WTA Tournament of Champions
- Surface: Hard / indoor
- Location: Sofia, Bulgaria
- Venue: Arena Armeec

Champions

Singles
- (Germany) Andrea Petkovic
← 2013 ·	WTA Tournament of Champions

The 2014 Garanti Koza WTA Tournament of Champions was a singles-only tennis tournament played from 28 October until 2 November 2014, on an indoor hard court. It was won by Andrea Petkovic. For the second year of a two-year deal, the tournament by Turkish construction firm Garanti Koza. This was the sixth edition of the tournament as part of the 2014 WTA Tour as well as the third and last held at Arena Armeec in Sofia, Bulgaria. Defending champion Simona Halep did not take part since she qualified for the 2014 WTA Finals.

== Participants and format ==
The tournament was the season ending event for players who had won one of the WTA International tournaments but had not qualified for the WTA Championships. It consisted of a singles draw of eight players including two wild cards in a round robin format, split into two groups of four. Over the first four days of competition, each player met the other three players in their group, with the top two in each group advancing to the semifinals. The first-placed player in one group met the second-placed player in the other group, and vice versa. The winners of each semifinal met in the championship match.

=== Round robin tie-breaking methods ===
The final standings of each group was determined by the first of the following methods that apply:

1. Greatest number of wins
2. Greatest number of matches played; or
3. Head-to-head results if only two players are tied, or if three players are tied then:

a If three players each have the same number of wins, a player having played less than all three matches is automatically eliminated and the player advancing to the single elimination competition is the winner of the match-up of the two remaining tied players; or
b Highest percentage of sets won; or
c Highest percentage of games won

== Prize money and points ==
The total prize money for the 2014 Garanti Koza WTA Tournament of Champions was 750,000 United States dollars.

Stage	Singles	Points ^{1}
Champion	RR^{2} + 200,000	RR^{2} + 195
Runner-up	RR^{2} + 75,000	RR^{2} + 75
Semifinalist	RR^{2} + 10,000	RR^{2}
Round Robin (3 wins)	80,000	180
Round Robin (2 wins)	65,000	145
Round Robin (1 win)	50,000	110
Round Robin (0 wins)	35,000	75
Alternate	7,500^{3}	0

- ^{1} for every match played in the round robin stage, a player got 25 points, and for each round robin win a player got 35 additional points.
- ^{2} RR means prize money or points won during round robin play.
- ^{3} Alternates received $7,500 in prize money, even if they did not play.

== 2014 WTA International tournaments champions ==
Player	Nationality	Tournament/s Won
Ana Ivanovic	SRB	(New Zealand) Auckland (Mexico) Monterrey
Li Na	CHN	(China) Shenzhen
Garbiñe Muguruza	ESP	(Australia) Hobart
Ekaterina Makarova	RUS	(Thailand) Pattaya City
Kurumi Nara	JPN	(Brazil) Rio de Janeiro
Klára Koukalová	CZE	(Brazil) Florianópolis
Dominika Cibulková	SVK	(Mexico) Acapulco
Alizé Cornet	FRA	(Poland) Katowice
Caroline Garcia	FRA	(Colombia) Bogota
Donna Vekić	CRO	(Malaysia) Kuala Lumpur
María Teresa Torró Flor	ESP	(Morocco) Marrakech
Carla Suárez Navarro	ESP	(Portugal) Oeiras
Monica Puig	PUR	(France) Strasbourg
Eugénie Bouchard	CAN	(Germany) Nürnberg
Coco Vandeweghe	USA	(Netherlands) 's-Hertogenbosch
Andrea Petkovic	GER	(Austria) Bad Gastein
Simona Halep	ROU	(Romania) Bucharest
Caroline Wozniacki	DEN	(Turkey) İstanbul
Mona Barthel	GER	(Sweden) Bastad
Elina Svitolina	UKR	(Azerbaijan) Baku
Svetlana Kuznetsova	RUS	(United States) Washington D.C.
Karin Knapp	ITA	(Uzbekistan) Tashkent
Sabine Lisicki	GER	Hong Kong
Mirjana Lučić-Baroni	CRO	(Canada) Quebec City
Monica Niculescu	ROU	(China) Guangzhou
Karolína Plíšková	CZE	(South Korea) Seoul (Austria) Linz
Alison Riske	USA	(China) Tianjin
Samantha Stosur	AUS	(Japan) Osaka
Annika Beck	GER	Luxembourg

== Participants ==
The six highest-ranked players who had captured at least one International tournament during the year and who were not participating in singles at the year-end WTA Finals in Singapore. Players with a purple colour qualified for the 2014 WTA Finals. The two wildcards were first awarded to Tsvetana Pironkova and Jelena Janković. On 11 October, Jankovic withdrew from the tournament and the wild card went to Flavia Pennetta. On 23 October, Samantha Stosur withdrew due to a foot injury and her place went to Garbiñe Muguruza.

WTA singles Rankings (20 October 2014)
Sd	Player	Rk	Won
-	(Romania) Simona Halep	4	(Romania) Bucharest
-	(Canada) Eugenie Bouchard	5	(Germany) Nürnberg
-	(Serbia) Ana Ivanovic	7	(New Zealand) Auckland (Mexico) Monterrey
-	(Denmark) Caroline Wozniacki	8	(Turkey) İstanbul
-	(China) Li Na	9	(China) Shenzhen
1	(Russia) Ekaterina Makarova	11	(Thailand) Pattaya City
2	(Slovakia) Dominika Cibulková	12	(Mexico) Acapulco
3	(Italy) Flavia Pennetta	15	Wildcard
4	(Germany) Andrea Petkovic	17	(Austria) Bad Gastein
5	(Spain) Carla Suárez Navarro	18	(Portugal) Oeiras
6	(France) Alizé Cornet	20	(Poland) Katowice
-	(Australia) Samantha Stosur	21	(Japan) Osaka
7	(Spain) Garbiñe Muguruza	23	(Australia) Hobart
8	(Bulgaria) Tsvetana Pironkova	41	Wildcard
Alt	(Czech Republic) Karolína Plíšková	24	(South Korea) Seoul (Austria) Linz
Alt	(Ukraine) Elina Svitolina	30	(Azerbaijan) Baku

== Final ==
=== Singles ===
- (Germany) Andrea Petkovic defeated (Italy) Flavia Pennetta, 1–6, 6–4, 6–3

== See also ==
- WTA Tournament of Champions
- 2014 WTA Tour
- 2014 WTA Finals
