= Raluca Olaru =

Romanian tennis player

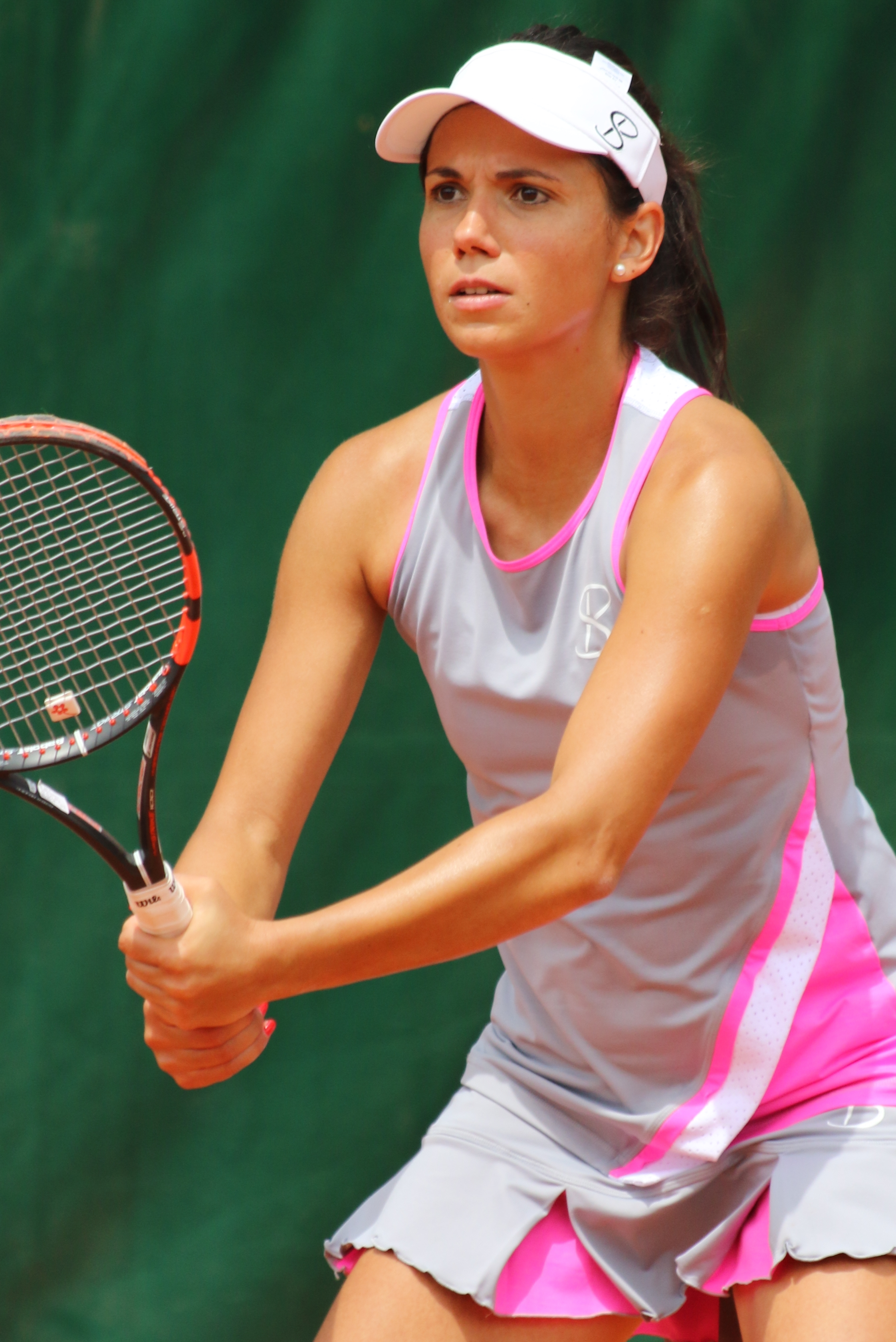
- Olaru at the 2020 French Open
- Full name: Ioana Raluca Olaru
- Country (sports): Romania
- Residence: Bucharest, Romania
- Born: 3 March 1989 (age 37) Bucharest
- Height: 1.73 m (5 ft 8 in)
- Turned pro: 2003
- Retired: 2024
- Plays: Right (two–handed backhand)
- Prize money: $1,770,957

Singles
- Career record: 258–186
- Career titles: 11 ITF
- Highest ranking: No. 53 (27 July 2009)

Grand Slam singles results
- Australian Open: 1R (2008, 2010)
- French Open: 3R (2007)
- Wimbledon: 2R (2009, 2010)
- US Open: 2R (2007, 2008)

Doubles
- Career record: 337–273
- Career titles: 11 WTA, 15 ITF
- Highest ranking: No. 30 (31 January 2022)

Grand Slam doubles results
- Australian Open: 2R (2010, 2014, 2016, 2017, 2018, 2021, 2022)
- French Open: QF (2017)
- Wimbledon: 3R (2021, 2022)
- US Open: 3R (2015, 2021)

Other doubles tournaments
- Tour Finals: Alt (2021)
- Olympic Games: 2R (2016, 2020)

Grand Slam mixed doubles results
- Australian Open: 1R (2022)
- French Open: 2R (2019)
- Wimbledon: QF (2019)
- US Open: QF (2018)

Team competitions
- Fed Cup: 6–11

Ioana Raluca Olaru (born 3 March 1989) is a Romanian former tennis player. The winner of eleven singles and fifteen doubles titles on the ITF Women's Circuit, Olaru reached one WTA Tour singles final, at the 2009 Gastein Ladies, losing to Andrea Petkovic, in straight sets. She also won eleven doubles titles on WTA Tour tournaments.

Olaru was a successful junior player. She was the runner-up in both junior singles and doubles at the 2005 French Open, and captured the 2006 US Open doubles title along with Mihaela Buzărnescu. Her best result as professional at a major was reaching the third round of the 2007 French Open, when she defeated the 30th seed, Julia Vakulenko, in straight sets, and lost to eventual runner-up and seventh seed, Ana Ivanovic. Olaru reached her highest singles ranking, world No. 53, on 27 July 2009, and her best doubles ranking, No. 30, on 31 January 2022.

Olaru announced her retirement from tennis in June 2024.

== Personal life ==
Olaru resides in her hometown Bucharest. Her parents, Adrian and Doina, run a convenience store together. Her sister Cristina is 16 years older than Olaru, and lives in London. Olaru began playing tennis aged seven, and cites Kim Clijsters, Martina Navratilova and Roger Federer as her role models. She graduated from school in 2007, and is fluent in English, Spanish and Romanian.

== Career ==
Raluca started her 2017 season at Shenzhen Open where she reached the final with Olga Savchuk, but they lost to Peng Shuai and Andrea Hlaváčková. The following week, partnering with Olga Savchuk, Olaru won the doubles title at the Hobart International, it was her sixth career doubles title.

== Playing style ==
Olaru considers being a fighter as her biggest asset. She cites clay as her favourite surface and backhand down the line as favourite shot, but she can play well on all surfaces and she likes mixing her game with drop shots. Olaru was coached by Adrian Gavrila, Adrian Cruciat and Artemon Apostu Efremov.

== Performance timelines ==
Key
W	F	SF	QF	#R	RR	Q#	DNQ	A	NH

(W) winner; (F) finalist; (SF) semifinalist; (QF) quarterfinalist; (#R) rounds 4, 3, 2, 1; (RR) round-robin stage; (Q#) qualification round; (DNQ) did not qualify; (A) absent; (NH) not held; (SR) strike rate (events won / competed); (W–L) win–loss record.
To avoid confusion and double counting, these charts are updated at the conclusion of a tournament or when the player's participation has ended.

Only main-draw results in WTA Tour, Grand Slam tournaments, Fed Cup/Billie Jean King Cup and Olympic Games are included in win–loss records.

=== Singles ===
Tournament	2005	2006	2007	2008	2009	2010	2011	2012	2013	2014	SR	W–L	Win %
Grand Slam tournaments
Australian Open	A	A	A	1R	Q2	1R	Q2	A	Q1	A	0 / 2	0–2	0%
French Open	A	A	3R	1R	1R	1R	Q1	A	Q1	A	0 / 4	2–4	33%
Wimbledon	A	A	A	1R	2R	2R	Q1	A	Q1	A	0 / 3	2–3	40%
US Open	A	A	2R	2R	1R	Q1	A	A	A	A	0 / 3	2–3	40%
Win–Loss	0–0	0–0	3–2	1–4	1–3	1–3	0–0	0–0	0–0	0–0	0 / 12	6–12	33%
National representation
Summer Olympics	NH			A	NH			A	NH	A	0 / 0	0–0	–
Billie Jean King Cup (Note: known as the Fed Cup during Olaru's singles career)	A	A	Z1	Z1	A	A	PO2	WG	WG2	WG2	0 / 0	0–0	—
WTA 1000
Indian Wells	A	A	A	2R	A	1R	A	A	A	A	0 / 2	1–2	33%
Miami Open	A	A	A	1R	A	1R	A	A	A	A	0 / 2	0–2	0%
Madrid Open	NH				Q2	A	A	A	A	A	0 / 0	0–0	–
Cincinnati Open	NMS			Q1	A	A	A	A	A	A	0 / 0	0–0	–
Win–Loss	0–0	0–0	0–0	1–2	0–0	0–2	0–0	0–0	0–0	0–0	0 / 4	1–4	20%
Career statistics
	2005	2006	2007	2008	2009	2010	2011	2012	2013	2014	SR	W–L	Win %
Titles	0	0	0	0	0	0	0	0	0	0	Career total: 0		
Finals	0	0	0	0	1	0	0	0	0	0	Career total: 1		
Year-end ranking	509	311	56	126	73	182	247	247	359	773			

=== Doubles ===
Tournament	2005	2006	2007	2008	2009	2010	2011	2012	2013	2014	2015	2016	2017	2018	2019	2020	2021	2022	SR	W–L	Win %
Grand Slam tournaments
Australian Open	A	A	A	1R	A	2R	1R	A	A	2R	1R	2R	2R	2R	1R	1R	2R	2R	0 / 12	7–12	37%
French Open	A	A	A	1R	A	1R	A	A	A	1R	1R	1R	QF	1R	1R	1R	2R	1R	0 / 11	4–11	27%
Wimbledon	A	A	A	A	Q1	A	A	A	2R	1R	1R	1R	1R	1R	1R	NH	3R	3R	0 / 9	5–9	36%
US Open	A	A	A	A	1R	A	A	A	A	1R	3R	1R	1R	2R	2R	1R	3R	1R	0 / 10	6–10	38%
Win–Loss	0–0	0–0	0–0	0–2	0–1	1–2	0–1	0–0	1–1	1–4	2–4	1–4	4–4	2–4	1–4	0–3	6–4	3–4	0 / 42	22–42	34%
National representation
Summer Olympics	NH	A	NH			A	NH			A	NH	2R	NH			A (Note: The 2020 Summer Olympics were postponed to 2021 because of the COVID-19 pandemic.)	2R	NH	0 / 2	2–2	50%
Billie Jean King Cup (Note: known as Fed Cup until 2020.)	A	A	A	Z1	A	A	PO2	WG	WG2	WG2	WG	PO	WG2	WG	SF	A	A	A	0 / 0	7–5	58%
WTA 1000 tournaments
Dubai Championships	A	A	A	A	A	A	A	1R	A	1R	2R	A	QF	A	A	A	A	A	0 / 4	3–4	43%
Indian Wells Open	A	A	A	A	A	A	A	A	A	A	2R	1R	1R	1R	QF	NH	1R	1R	0 / 7	3–7	30%
Miami Open	A	A	A	A	A	A	A	A	A	A	A	1R	1R	1R	QF	NH	1R	1R	0 / 6	2–6	25%
Madrid Open	NH				A	A	A	2R	2R	A	A	1R	NH	2R	A	A	A	A	0 / 4	2–4	33%
Italian Open	A	A	A	A	A	A	A	A	A	A	1R	A	A	A	1R	F	1R	A	0 / 4	4–4	50%
Canadian Open	A	A	A	A	A	A	A	A	A	A	QF	A	A	A	2R	NH	A	A	0 / 2	3–1	75%
Cincinnati Open	NMS				A	A	A	A	1R	QF	2R	1R	A	1R	A	NH	A	A	0 / 5	3–5	38%
Wuhan Open	NMS									1R	1R	A	1R	A	2R	NH			0 / 4	1–4	20%
China Open	NMS				A	A	A	A	A	A	A	A	2R	1R	1R	A	A	A	0 / 3	1–3	25%
Win–Loss	0–0	0–0	0–0	0–0	0–0	0–0	0–0	1–2	1–2	1–3	4–7	0–4	2–4	1–4	5–6	4–0	0–4	0–2	0 / 41	19–38	33%
Career statistics
	2005	2006	2007	2008	2009	2010	2011	2012	2013	2014	2015	2016	2017	2018	2019	2020	2021	2022	SR	W–L	Win %
Tournaments	1	1	2	6	11	10	6	1	9	22	24	23	23	21	22	10	20	12	Career total: 224		
Titles	0	0	0	1	0	0	1	0	1	1	0	1	2	2	0	0	2	0	Career total: 11		
Overall win–loss	—																		11 / 224	337–273	55%
Year-end ranking	no rank	no rank	no rank	no rank	no rank	no rank	no rank	no rank	73	55	54	74	36	44	48	43	36	155			

=== Mixed doubles ===
Tournament	2005-2012	2013	2014	2015	2016	2017	2018	2019	2020	2021	SR	W–L
Australian Open	A									1R	0 / 1	0–1
French Open	A							2R	NH	A	0 / 1	1–1
Wimbledon	A			3R	1R	2R	2R	QF	NH	A	0 / 5	6–5
US Open	A					2R	QF	2R	NH	A	0 / 3	4–3
Win–Loss	0–0	0–0	0–0	2–1	0–1	2–2	3–2	4–3	0–0	0–1	0 / 10	11–10

== Significant finals ==
=== Premier-Mandatory/Premier-5 tournaments ===
==== Doubles: 1 (runner-up) ====
Result	Year	Tournament	Surface	Partner	Opponents	Score
Loss	2020	Italian Open	Clay	(Germany) Anna-Lena Friedsam	(Chinese Taipei) Hsieh Su-wei (Czech Republic) Barbora Strýcová	2–6, 2–6

== WTA Tour finals ==
=== Singles: 1 (runner-up) ===
Legend WTA 250 (0–1)	Finals by surface Clay (0–1)	Finals by setting Outdoor (0–1)

Result	W–L	Date	Tournament	Tier	Surface	Opponent	Score
Loss	0–1	Jul 2009	Gastein Ladies, Austria	International (Note: The WTA Tier III tournaments, WTA Tier IV tournaments and WTA Tier V tournaments were reclassified as WTA International tournaments in 2009 and later as WTA 250 tournaments in 2021.)	Clay	(Germany) Andrea Petkovic	2–6, 3–6

=== Doubles: 24 (11 titles, 13 runner-ups) ===
Legend WTA 1000 (0–1) WTA 500 (1–2) WTA 250 (10–10)	Finals by surface Hard (7–5) Clay (4–7) Grass (0–1)	Finals by setting Outdoor (9–10) Indoor (2–3)

Result	W–L	Date	Tournament	Tier	Surface	Partner	Opponents	Score
Loss	0–1	Jul 2008	Budapest Grand Prix, Hungary	Tier III	Clay	(Germany) Vanessa Henke	(France) Alizé Cornet (Slovakia) Janette Husárová	7–6^{(7–5)}, 1–6, [6–10]
Win	1–1	Oct 2008	Tashkent Open, Uzbekistan	Tier IV	Hard	(Ukraine) Olga Savchuk	(Russia) Nina Bratchikova (Germany) Kathrin Wörle	5–7, 7–5, [10–7]
Win	2–1	Feb 2011	Abierto Mexicano, Mexico	International	Hard	(Ukraine) Mariya Koryttseva	(Spain) Arantxa Parra Santonja (Spain) Lourdes Domínguez Lino	5–7, 7–5, [10–7]
Loss	2–2	Apr 2013	Katowice Open, Poland	International	Clay (i)	(Russia) Valeria Solovyeva	(Spain) Lara Arruabarrena (Spain) Lourdes Domínguez Lino	4–6, 5–7
Win	3–2	Jun 2013	Nuremberg Cup, Germany	International	Clay	(Russia) Valeria Solovyeva	(Germany) Anna-Lena Grönefeld (Czech Republic) Květa Peschke	2–6, 7–6^{(7–3)}, [11–9]
Loss	3–3	May 2014	Nuremberg Cup, Germany	International	Clay	(Israel) Shahar Pe'er	(Netherlands) Michaëlla Krajicek (Czech Republic) Karolína Plíšková	0–6, 6–4, [6–10]
Loss	3–4	Jul 2014	Baku Cup, Azerbaijan	International	Hard	(Israel) Shahar Pe'er	(Russia) Alexandra Panova (United Kingdom) Heather Watson	2–6, 6–7^{(3–7)}
Win	4–4	Oct 2014	Linz Open, Austria	International	Hard (i)	(United States) Anna Tatishvili	(Germany) Annika Beck (France) Caroline Garcia	6–2, 6–1
Loss	4–5	May 2015	Nuremberg Cup, Germany	International	Clay	(Spain) Lara Arruabarrena	(Chinese Taipei) Chan Hao-ching (Spain) Anabel Medina Garrigues	4–6, 6–7^{(5–7)}
Loss	4–6	Apr 2016	Rabat Grand Prix, Morocco	International	Clay	(Germany) Tatjana Maria	(Switzerland) Xenia Knoll (Serbia) Aleksandra Krunić	3–6, 0–6
Win	5–6	Oct 2016	Tashkent Open, Uzbekistan (2)	International	Hard	(Turkey) İpek Soylu	(Netherlands) Demi Schuurs (Czech Republic) Renata Voráčová	7–5, 6–3
Loss	5–7	Jan 2017	Shenzhen Open, China	International	Hard	(Ukraine) Olga Savchuk	(Czech Republic) Andrea Hlaváčková (China) Peng Shuai	1–6, 5–7
Win	6–7	Jan 2017	Hobart International, Australia	International	Hard	(Ukraine) Olga Savchuk	(Canada) Gabriela Dabrowski (China) Yang Zhaoxuan	0–6, 6–4, [10–5]
Win	7–7	Jul 2017	Bucharest Open, Romania	International	Clay	(Romania) Irina-Camelia Begu	(Belgium) Elise Mertens (Netherlands) Demi Schuurs	6–3, 6–3
Win	8–7	May 2018	Rabat Grand Prix, Morocco	International	Clay	(Russia) Anna Blinkova	(Spain) Georgina García Pérez (Hungary) Fanny Stollár	6–4, 6–4
Win	9–7	May 2018	Strasbourg International, France	International	Clay	(Romania) Mihaela Buzărnescu	(Ukraine) Nadiia Kichenok (Australia) Anastasia Rodionova	7–5, 7–5
Loss	9–8	Sep 2018	Tashkent Open, Uzbekistan	International	Hard	(Romania) Irina-Camelia Begu	(Serbia) Olga Danilović (Slovenia) Tamara Zidanšek	5–7, 3–6
Loss	9–9	Oct 2018	Kremlin Cup, Russia	Premier (Note: The WTA Premier tournaments were reclassified as WTA 500 tournaments in 2021.)	Hard (i)	(Croatia) Darija Jurak	(Russia) Alexandra Panova (Germany) Laura Siegemund	2–6, 6–7^{(2–7)}
Loss	9–10	Aug 2020	Prague Open, Czech Republic	International	Clay	(Romania) Monica Niculescu	(Czech Republic) Lucie Hradecká (Czech Republic) Kristýna Plíšková	2–6, 2–6
Loss	9–11	Sep 2020	Italian Open, Italy	Premier 5 (Note: The WTA Premier 5 & Mandatory tournaments were reclassified as WTA 1000 tournaments in 2021.)	Clay	(Germany) Anna-Lena Friedsam	(Chinese Taipei) Hsieh Su-wei (Czech Republic) Barbora Strýcová	2–6, 2–6
Win	10–11	Mar 2021	St. Petersburg Trophy, Russia	WTA 500	Hard (i)	(Ukraine) Nadiia Kichenok	(United States) Kaitlyn Christian (United States) Sabrina Santamaria	2–6, 6–3, [10–8]
Loss	10–12	Jun 2021	Bad Homburg Open, Germany	WTA 250	Grass	(Ukraine) Nadiia Kichenok	(Croatia) Darija Jurak (Slovenia) Andreja Klepač	3–6, 1–6
Win	11–12	Aug 2021	Chicago Open, US	WTA 250	Hard	(Ukraine) Nadiia Kichenok	(Ukraine) Lyudmyla Kichenok (Japan) Makoto Ninomiya	7–6^{(8–6)}, 5–7, [10–8]
Loss	11–13	Oct 2021	Kremlin Cup, Russia	WTA 500	Hard (i)	(Ukraine) Nadiia Kichenok	(Latvia) Jeļena Ostapenko (Czech Republic) Kateřina Siniaková	2–6, 6–4, [8–10]

== WTA 125 finals ==
=== Doubles: 1 (runner-up) ===
Result	Date	Tournament	Surface	Partner	Opponents	Score
Loss	May 2016	Bol Ladies Open, Croatia	Clay	(Turkey) İpek Soylu	(Switzerland) Xenia Knoll (Croatia) Petra Martić	3–6, 2–6

== ITF Circuit finals ==
Legend
$100,000 tournaments
$75,000 tournaments
$50,000 tournaments
$25,000 tournaments
$10,000 tournaments

=== Singles: 18 (11 titles, 7 runner-ups) ===
Result	W–L	Date	Tournament	Tier	Surface	Opponent	Score
Loss	0–1	Aug 2004	ITF Iași, Romania	10,000	Clay	(Romania) Monica Niculescu	6–7, 0–6
Win	1–1	Apr 2005	ITF Herceg Novi, Serbia	10,000	Clay	(Serbia) Miljana Adanko	7–5, 7–6^{(2)}
Win	2–1	Jul 2005	ITF Bucharest, Romania	10,000	Clay	(Russia) Anna Bastrikova	6–3, 6–2
Win	3–1	Aug 2005	ITF Bucharest, Romania	10,000	Clay	(Romania) Mădălina Gojnea	7–6^{(3)}, 7–5
Win	4–1	May 2006	ITF Bucharest, Romania	10,000	Clay	(Romania) Sorana Cîrstea	1–6, 6–4, 6–1
Win	5–1	May 2006	ITF Rabat, Morocco	10,000	Clay	(Algeria) Samia Medjahdi	6–2, 2–6, 7–5
Loss	5–2	Jul 2006	ITF Mont-de-Marsan, France	25,000	Clay	(Russia) Nina Bratchikova	4–6, 6–4, 0–6
Win	6–2	Nov 2006	ITF Toronto, Canada	25,000	Hard(i)	(United States) Carly Gullickson	6–3, 6–1
Win	7–2	Apr 2007	ITF Torrent, Spain	50,000	Clay	(Germany) Andrea Petkovic	6–4, 5–7, 6–4
Loss	7–3	Apr 2007	ITF Catania, Italy	25,000	Clay	(Belarus) Darya Kustova	3–6, 6–2, 3–6
Win	8–3	Jul 2008	Contrexéville Open, France	50,000	Clay	(France) Stéphanie Foretz	6–4, 6–2
Win	9–3	Jun 2009	Open de Marseille, France	100,000	Clay	(Slovenia) Maša Zec Peškirič	6–7^{(4)}, 7–5, 6–4
Win	10–3	Jul 2011	ITF Bad Saulgau, Germany	25,000	Clay	(Germany) Tatjana Maria	6–3, 3–6, 7–5
Loss	10–4	Apr 2012	ITF Pomezia, Italy	10,000	Clay	(Belarus) Aliaksandra Sasnovich	6–0, 1–6, 1–6
Loss	10–5	Oct 2012	ITF Brasília, Brazil	25,000	Clay	(Switzerland) Timea Bacsinszky	5–7, 2–6
Loss	10–6	Nov 2012	ITF Asunción, Paraguay	25,000	Clay	(Paraguay) Verónica Cepede Royg	7–5, 6–7^{(7)}, 2–6
Loss	10–7	Jan 2013	ITF Eilat, İsrael	10,000	Hard	(Russia) Alla Kudryavtseva	7–6^{(4)}, 3–6, 2–6
Win	11–7	Mar 2013	ITF Antalya, Turkey	10,000	Clay	(Serbia) Jovana Jakšić	6–3, 7–5

=== Doubles: 31 (15 titles, 16 runner-ups) ===
Result	W–L	Date	Tournament	Tier	Surface	Partner	Opponents	Score
Loss	0–1	Jun 2004	ITF Brașov, Romania	10,000	Clay	(Romania) Lenore Lăzăroiu	(Romania) Corina Corduneanu (Romania) Alexandra Iacob	4–6, 5–7
Loss	0–2	Aug 2004	ITF Timișoara, Romania	10,000	Clay	(Romania) Lenore Lăzăroiu	(Romania) Sorana Cîrstea (Romania) Gabriela Niculescu	1–6, 6–2, 2–6
Win	1–2	Sep 2004	ITF Cluj-Napoca, Romania	10,000	Clay	(Romania) Corina Corduneanu	(Czech Republic) Veronika Raimrová (Romania) Anamaria Sere	4–6, 6–0, 6–4
Win	2–2	Apr 2005	ITF Herceg Novi, Serbia	10,000	Clay	(Romania) Antonia Xenia Tout	(Slovenia) Aleksandra Lukič (Slovenia) Patricia Vollmeier	6–4, 4–1 ret.
Win	3–2	July 2005	ITF Arad, Romania	10,000	Clay	(Romania) Corina Corduneanu	(Russia) Anna Bastrikova (Russia) Vasilisa Davydova	6–1, 6–4
Win	4–2	Aug 2005	ITF Bucharest, Romania	10,000	Clay	(Romania) Corina Corduneanu	(Romania) Bianca Ioana Bonifate (Romania) Sorana Cîrstea	6–1, 6–1
Win	5–2	Apr 2006	ITF Makarska, Croatia	10,000	Clay	(Romania) Antonia Xenia Tout	(Sweden) Johanna Larsson (Sweden) Nadja Roma	6–4, 7–5
Loss	5–3	May 2006	ITF Bucharest, Romania	10,000	Clay	(Romania) Simona Matei	(Romania) Sorana Cîrstea (Romania) Gabriela Niculescu	4–6, 6–0, 6–7^{(3)}
Loss	5–4	May 2006	ITF Rabat, Morocco	10,000	Clay	(Bolivia) María Fernanda Álvarez	(Morocco) Bahia Mouhtassine (France) Émilie Bacquet	w/o
Win	6–4	July 2006	ITF Mont-de-Marsan, France	25,000	Clay	(Georgia (country)) Margalita Chakhnashvili	(Uzbekistan) Akgul Amanmuradova (Russia) Nina Bratchikova	7–5, 1–6, 6–1
Loss	6–5	Aug 2006	Ladies Open Hechingen, Germany	25,000	Clay	(Ukraine) Kristina Antoniichuk	(Slovakia) Eva Fislová (Slovakia) Stanislava Hrozenská	3–6, 7–6^{(3)}, 3–6
Loss	6–6	Nov 2006	ITF Toronto, Canada	25,000	Hard (i)	(Canada) Heidi El Tabakh	(Germany) Angelika Bachmann (Czech Republic) Hana Šromová	4–6, 1–6
Win	7–6	Sep 2010	ITF Biella, Italy	100,000	Clay	(Ukraine) Mariya Koryttseva	(Slovenia) Andreja Klepač (France) Aurélie Védy	7–5, 6–4
Loss	7–7	Sep 2010	Open de Saint Malo, France	100,000	Clay	(Ukraine) Mariya Koryttseva	(Czech Republic) Petra Cetkovská (Czech Republic) Lucie Hradecká	4–6, 2–6
Loss	7–8	Sep 2011	Sofia Cup, Bulgaria	100,000	Clay	(Romania) Alexandra Cadanțu	(Russia) Nina Bratchikova (Croatia) Darija Jurak	4–6, 5–7
Win	8–8	Jan 2012	ITF Innisbrook, United States	25,000	Clay	(Belarus) Darya Kustova	(Italy) Gioia Barbieri (Russia) Nadejda Guskova	6–3, 6–1
Loss	8–9	Feb 2012	Copa Cali, Colombia	100,000	Clay	(Romania) Alexandra Cadanțu	(Italy) Karin Knapp (Luxembourg) Mandy Minella	4–6, 3–6
Win	9–9	Apr 2012	ITF Civitavecchia, Italy	25,000	Clay	(Romania) Elena Bogdan	(Italy) Claudia Giovine (Russia) Marina Shamayko	6–3, 7–5
Win	10–9	Apr 2012	ITF Tunis, Tunisia	25,000	Clay	(Romania) Elena Bogdan	(Spain) Inés Ferrer Suárez (Netherlands) Richèl Hogenkamp	6–4, 6–3
Loss	10–10	May 2012	ITF Casablanca, Morocco	25,000	Clay	(Romania) Elena Bogdan	(Ukraine) Olga Savchuk (Czech Republic) Renata Voráčová	1–6, 4–6
Loss	10–11	Jul 2012	Open Romania Ladies	100,000	Clay	(Romania) Elena Bogdan	(Romania) Irina-Camelia Begu (France) Alizé Cornet	2–6, 0–6
Win	11–11	Aug 2012	ITF Mamaia, Romania	25,000	Clay	(Romania) Elena Bogdan	(Montenegro) Danka Kovinić (Slovenia) Tadeja Majerič	7–6^{(4)}, 6–3
Loss	11–12	Sep 2012	ITF Sofia, Bulgaria	25,000	Clay	(Russia) Marina Melnikova	(Poland) Katarzyna Piter (Poland) Barbara Sobaszkiewicz	5–7, 1–6
Win	12–12	Oct 2012	ITF Brasília, Brazil	25,000	Clay	(Romania) Elena Bogdan	(Switzerland) Timea Bacsinszky (United States) Julia Cohen	6–3, 3–6, [10–8]
Win	13–12	Nov 2012	ITF Buenos Aires, Argentina	25,000	Clay	(Romania) Elena Bogdan	(Bolivia) María Fernanda Álvarez (Brazil) Maria Fernanda Alves	1–6, 6–2, [10–7]
Win	14–12	Jan 2013	ITF Eilat, Israel	10,000	Hard	(Russia) Alla Kudryavtseva	(Belarus) Ilona Kremen (Turkey) Pemra Özgen	6–3, 6–3
Loss	14–13	Nov 2013	GB Pro-Series Barnstaple, UK	75,000	Hard (i)	(Austria) Tamira Paszek	(United Kingdom) Naomi Broady (Czech Republic) Kristýna Plíšková	3–6, 6–3, [5–10]
Win	15–13	Jun 2015	Ilkley Trophy, UK	50,000	Grass	(China) Xu Yifan	(Belgium) An-Sophie Mestach (Netherlands) Demi Schuurs	6–3, 6–4
Loss	15–14	Aug 2015	Vancouver Open, Canada	100,000	Hard	(United States) Anna Tatishvili	(United Kingdom) Johanna Konta (United States) Maria Sanchez	6–7^{(5)}, 4–6
Loss	15–15	Sep 2016	Neva Cup, Russia	100,000	Hard (i)	(Russia) Alena Tarasova	(Russia) Maria Marfutina (Russia) Anna Morgina	2–6, 3–6
Loss	15–16	May 2017	Open de Cagnes-sur-Mer, France	100,000	Clay	(Czech Republic) Renata Voráčová	(Chinese Taipei) Chang Kai-chen (Chinese Taipei) Hsieh Su-wei	5–7, 1–6

== WTA Tour career earnings ==
Current through the end of the 2023 season.

Year	Grand Slam doubles titles	WTA doubles titles	Total doubles titles	Earnings ($)	Money list rank
2005	0	0	0	Not listed	Outside top 100
2006	0	0	0	Not listed	Outside top 100
2007	0	0	0	Not listed	Outside top 100
2008	0	1	1	amount	rank
2009	0	0	0	185,829	98
2010	0	0	0	amount	rank
2011	0	1	1	amount	rank
2012	0	0	0	amount	rank
2013	0	1	1	amount	rank
2014	0	1	1	amount	rank
2015	0	0	0	amount	rank
2016	0	1	1	88,392	202
2017	0	2	2	164,033	163
2018	0	2	2	amount	rank
2019	0	0	0	amount	rank
2020	0	0	0	amount	rank
2021	0	2	2	amount	rank
2022	0	0	0	85,579	278
2023	0	0	0	Not listed	Outside top 100
Career	0	11	11	1,770,957	—
