= Andrea Petkovic =

German tennis player

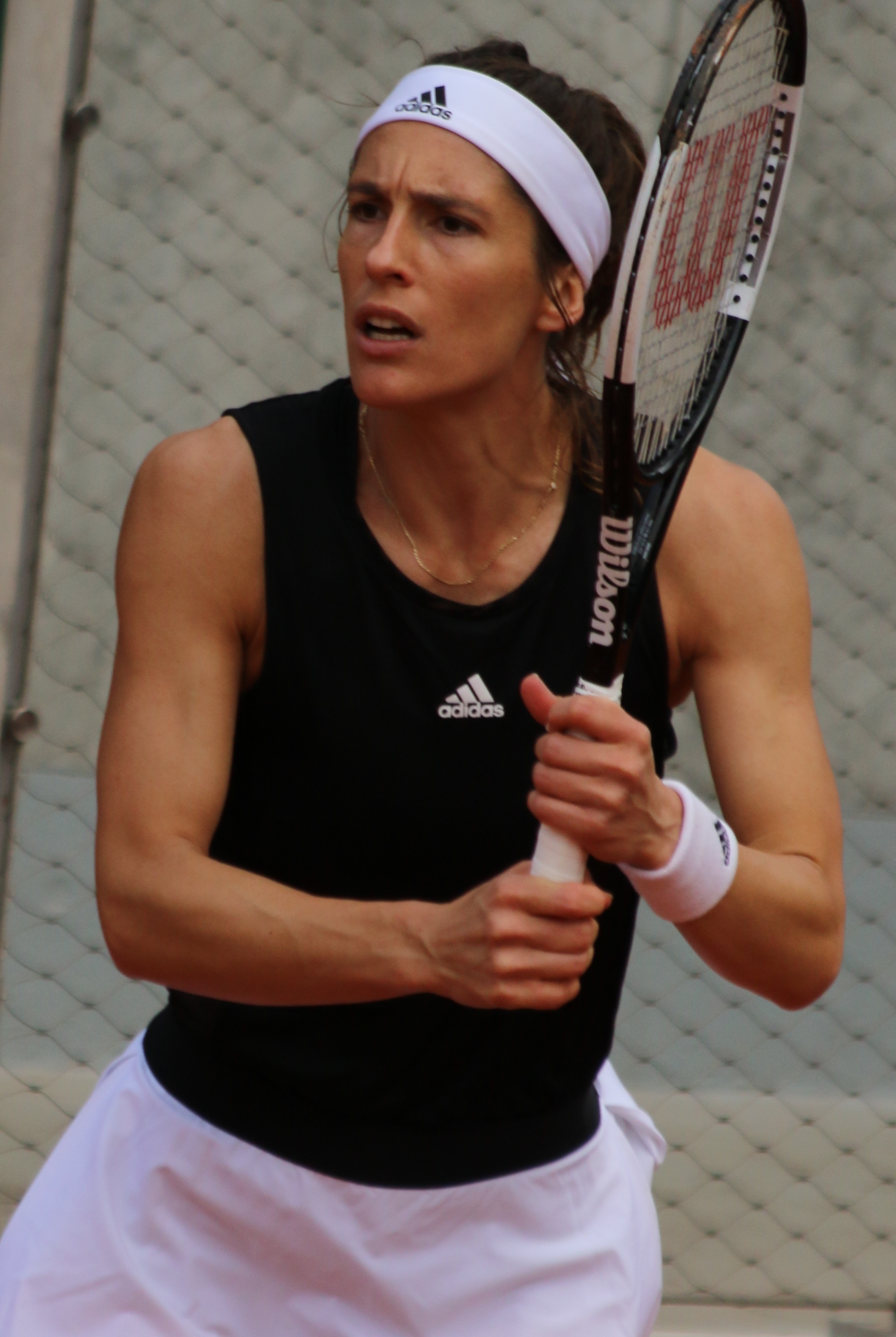
- Petkovic at the 2019 French Open
- Native name: Андреа Петковић
- Country (sports): Germany
- Born: 9 September 1987 (age 39) Tuzla, SR Bosnia and Herzegovina, SFR Yugoslavia
- Height: 1.80 m (5 ft 11 in)
- Turned pro: 2006
- Retired: 2022
- Plays: Right-handed (two-handed backhand)
- Prize money: US$8,829,248

Singles
- Career record: 518–366
- Career titles: 7
- Highest ranking: No. 9 (10 October 2011)

Grand Slam singles results
- Australian Open: QF (2011)
- French Open: SF (2014)
- Wimbledon: 3R (2011, 2014, 2015)
- US Open: QF (2011)

Doubles
- Career record: 106–120
- Career titles: 1
- Highest ranking: No. 46 (14 July 2014)

Grand Slam doubles results
- Australian Open: QF (2017)
- French Open: 3R (2011, 2014)
- Wimbledon: SF (2014)
- US Open: 2R (2009, 2011, 2016, 2021)

Grand Slam mixed doubles results
- Australian Open: 1R (2010)
- Wimbledon: 3R (2011)
- US Open: 1R (2012)

Team competitions
- Fed Cup: F (2014), record 15–15

Andrea Petkovic (Serbian: Андреа Петковић, romanized: Andrea Petković, pronounced [ǎndrea pêtkoʋitɕ]; born 9 September 1987) is a German former professional tennis player. Born in Tuzla, SFR Yugoslavia, to Serbian father Zoran and Bosniak mother Amira, she moved to Germany at six months old and turned professional in 2006 at the age of 18. A former top-10 player, Petkovic reached a career-high singles ranking of world No. 9 on 10 October 2011, becoming the first German female player ranked inside the top 10 since Steffi Graf in 1999. That year, she played in the quarterfinals of three Grand Slam tournaments as well as a Premier Mandatory final at the China Open, and qualified as an alternate to the WTA Tour Championships.

Petkovic suffered three separate injuries in 2012: a back injury in January, an ankle injury in August and a knee injury in December that kept her out for nine months, and almost saw her fall out of the top 200. She rebounded in 2014 by reaching her first Grand Slam semifinal at the 2014 French Open and later winning the WTA Tournament of Champions at the end of the season. Petkovic has won seven WTA Tour singles titles and one doubles title, as well as nine ITF singles and three ITF doubles titles. Petkovic became the German national champion in 2007 and 2009.

== Early and personal life ==
Andrea Petkovic was born in Tuzla, SR Bosnia and Herzegovina, SFR Yugoslavia. When she was six months old, the family relocated to Germany. Petkovic first took to the tennis courts when she was six; her father Zoran Petković, former Yugoslav tennis player and member of the Yugoslavia Davis Cup team, was a coach at a club in Darmstadt at the time. He introduced her to the sport and later became her coach. She was able to finish high school before competing in tennis full-time because Zoran never pressured her into joining the professional circuit.

Apart from tennis, she likes to educate herself by reading; her favourite authors are Goethe and Wilde. Her mother Amira is a dental assistant while her younger sister Anja is a student. Petkovic graduated from high school in 2006 with an Abitur from the Georg-Büchner-Schule in Darmstadt. She has been studying political science at the FernUniversität Hagen since 2008.

Petkovic also has a successful YouTube channel which is home to her video blog entitled "Petkorazzi". In the blog, she makes fun of herself, gives fans chances to win prizes, and shows fans what life is like on the tour. She does the blog in both German and English. In April 2018, she started writing a column for the Süddeutsche Zeitung.

Since the beginning of her professional career, she has kept a diary at irregular intervals about her life on the WTA Tour in the Frankfurter Allgemeine Zeitung, a major German newspaper. Petkovic obtained German citizenship in 2001. She speaks Serbian, German, English, and French. Petkovic is of Bosniak and Serb ancestry. In a 2009 interview with the WTA, she stated that her parents might move to Novi Sad, Serbia, where they have a second home. When asked how German she feels, Petkovic replied, "Obviously I'm German, but I always say my soul is still Serbian. Germans are generally more cool, reserved. I'm very emotional, have lots of fire in my personality. In that sense still feel very close to my heritage. For all that, there is much to appreciate about Germany. I feel like I am part of the 'system' and feel very rooted there."

== Career ==
=== Early career ===
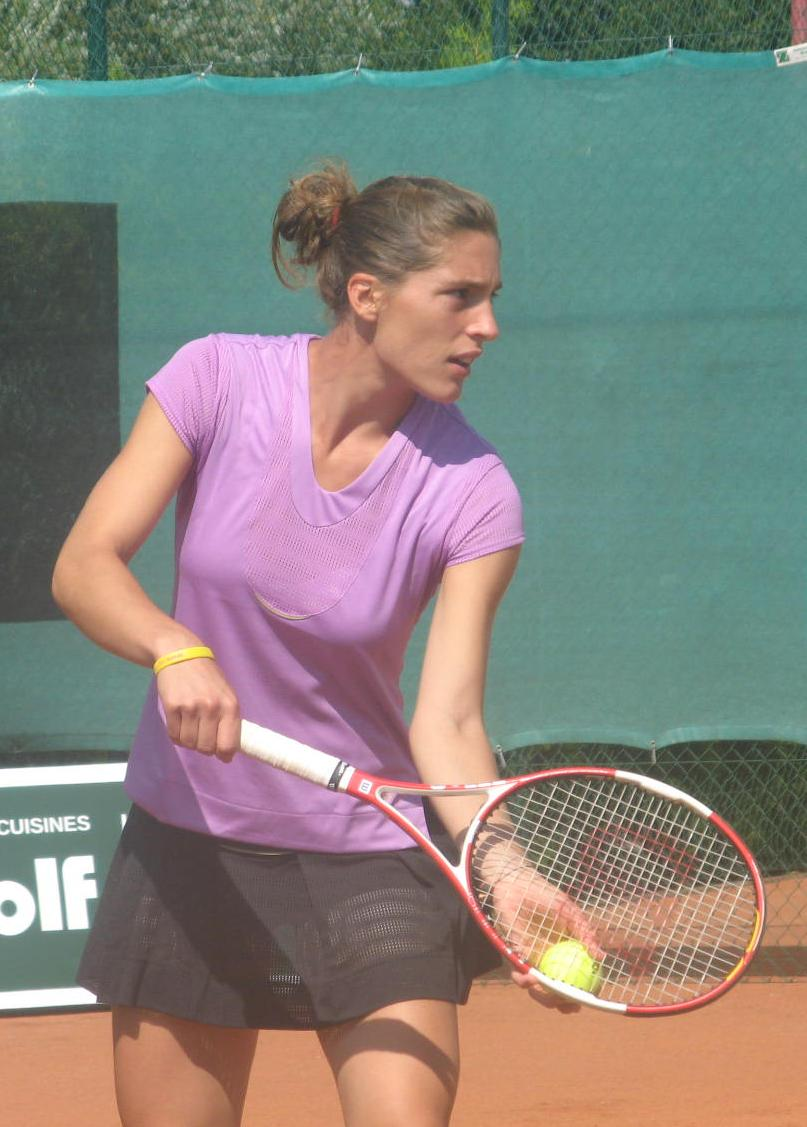
Petkovic at the ITF tournament in Pétange, Luxembourg, in July 2007

Petkovic turned professional in 2006 after she finished school, but she had already won four titles on the ITF Circuit. She was the winner of the tournaments in Antalya, Podgorica (both in 2004), Davos and Alphen aan den Rijn (both in 2005).

In April 2007, she became a member of the German Fed Cup team. She played her first Grand Slam tournament at the 2007 French Open where she reached the second round, after coming through the qualifying without losing a set and beating Jarmila Groth. There she lost to later Wimbledon champion Marion Bartoli. After this, and having some success on the ITF Circuit (she won the ITF title in Contrexéville in July 2007), she reached the top 100 of the WTA rankings for the first time. Because of that, she was able to play in the US Open main draw without having to qualify. She once again reached the second round after beating Audra Cohen. In round two she lost to Lucie Šafářová.

At the Australian Open in January 2008, in her first-round match against Anna Chakvetadze, she suffered a cruciate ligament rupture in her right knee after only two minutes of play. This prevented her from playing any tournament for almost eight months, which caused her ranking drop to 465. After the injury, she started playing mostly on the ITF Circuit again where she won a tournament in Istanbul in November 2008. She finished the year with a ranking of 315.

=== 2009: First WTA Tour title ===
In 2009, Petkovic played her first tournament at the Australian Open due to a protected ranking, where she reached the second round. She mostly kept on playing ITF tournaments until June with success. She won the Open Romania in Bucharest, defeating Jelena Dokić in the semifinals along the way, and regained a top-100 ranking.

In July 2009, Petkovic won her first WTA tournament in Bad Gastein, losing only one set throughout the tournament. In the final, she beat Raluca Olaru.The following week, she reached the semifinals in Istanbul, losing to Lucie Hradecká in three tight sets. After those two weeks, she achieved her then career high singles ranking of world No. 52.

For the rest of the year, she struggled to repeat her success but had another good tournament at the Pan Pacific Open in Tokyo where she came through the qualifying and reached the round of 16. In the second round, she had her win over a top-10 player in beating Svetlana Kuznetsova, but was knocked out by Agnieszka Radwańska.

=== 2010: Breakthrough year; into top 50 ===
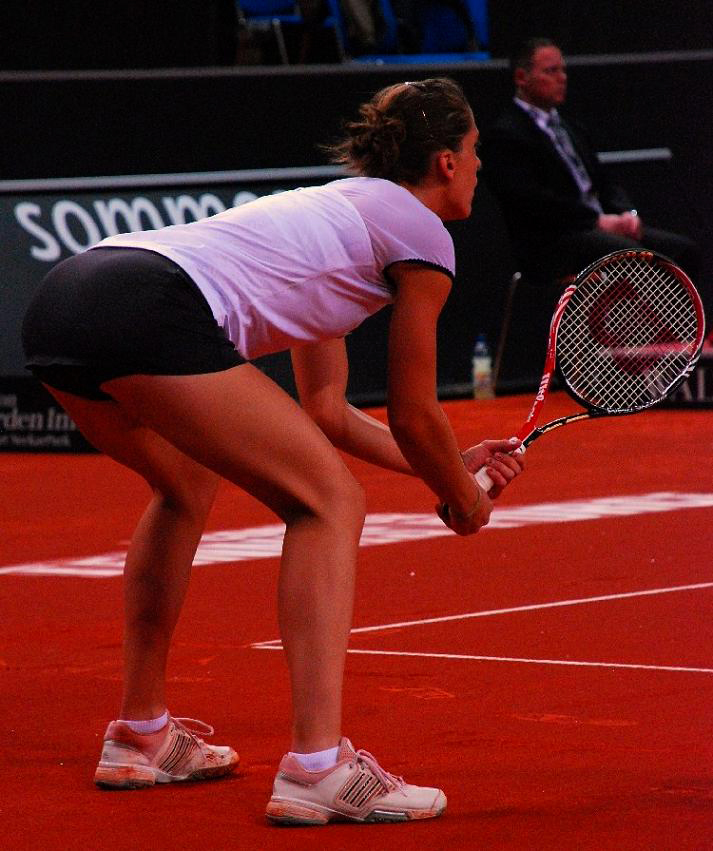
Petkovic at the 2010 Porsche Tennis Grand Prix

She played her first tournament in 2010 in Brisbane, Australia, where she reached the semifinal before losing to eventual champion Kim Clijsters. After that tournament, she reached the top 50 of the WTA rankings for the first time.

Petkovic's best singles performance in a Grand Slam event came at the US Open. Her first two matches were three-set upset victories over Nadia Petrova and Bethanie Mattek-Sands. She performed an on-court dance following both triumphs. After she received a third-round walkover due to an injury to Peng Shuai, Petkovic lost her first career Arthur Ashe Stadium appearance to eventual tournament finalist Vera Zvonareva.

=== 2011: Break into top 10; three Grand Slam quarterfinals ===
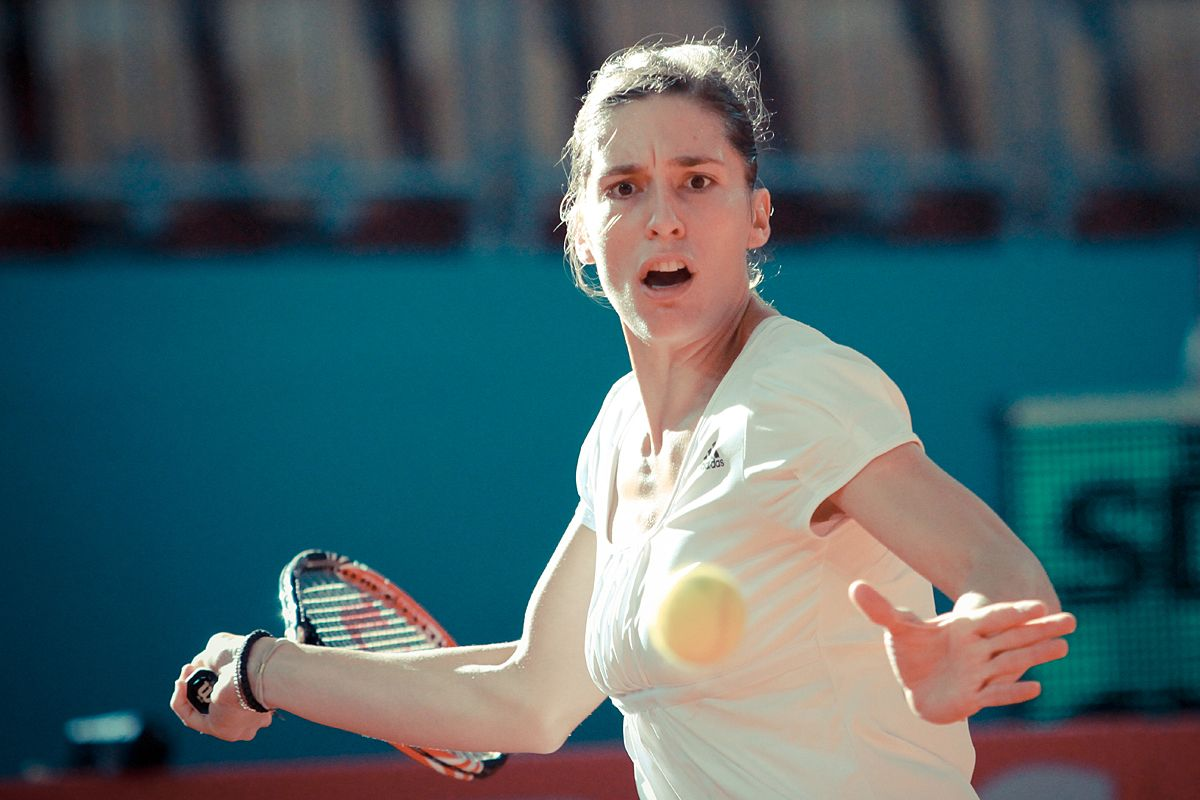
Petkovic at the 2011 Fed Cup

Returning to the Brisbane International, and with coach Petar Popović, Petkovic improved on her previous best semifinal appearance by reaching the final, where she lost to Wimbledon semifinalist Petra Kvitová.

Petkovic reached the quarterfinals of the Australian Open, where she was defeated by eventual finalist Li Na, her best achievement in a Grand Slam championship of her career.

Petkovic then played Fed Cup for Germany and helped them to a win over Slovenia with two wins in singles rubbers.

Petkovic defeated world number one Caroline Wozniacki in the fourth round at the Sony Ericsson Open in Miami, eventually reaching the semi-finals.

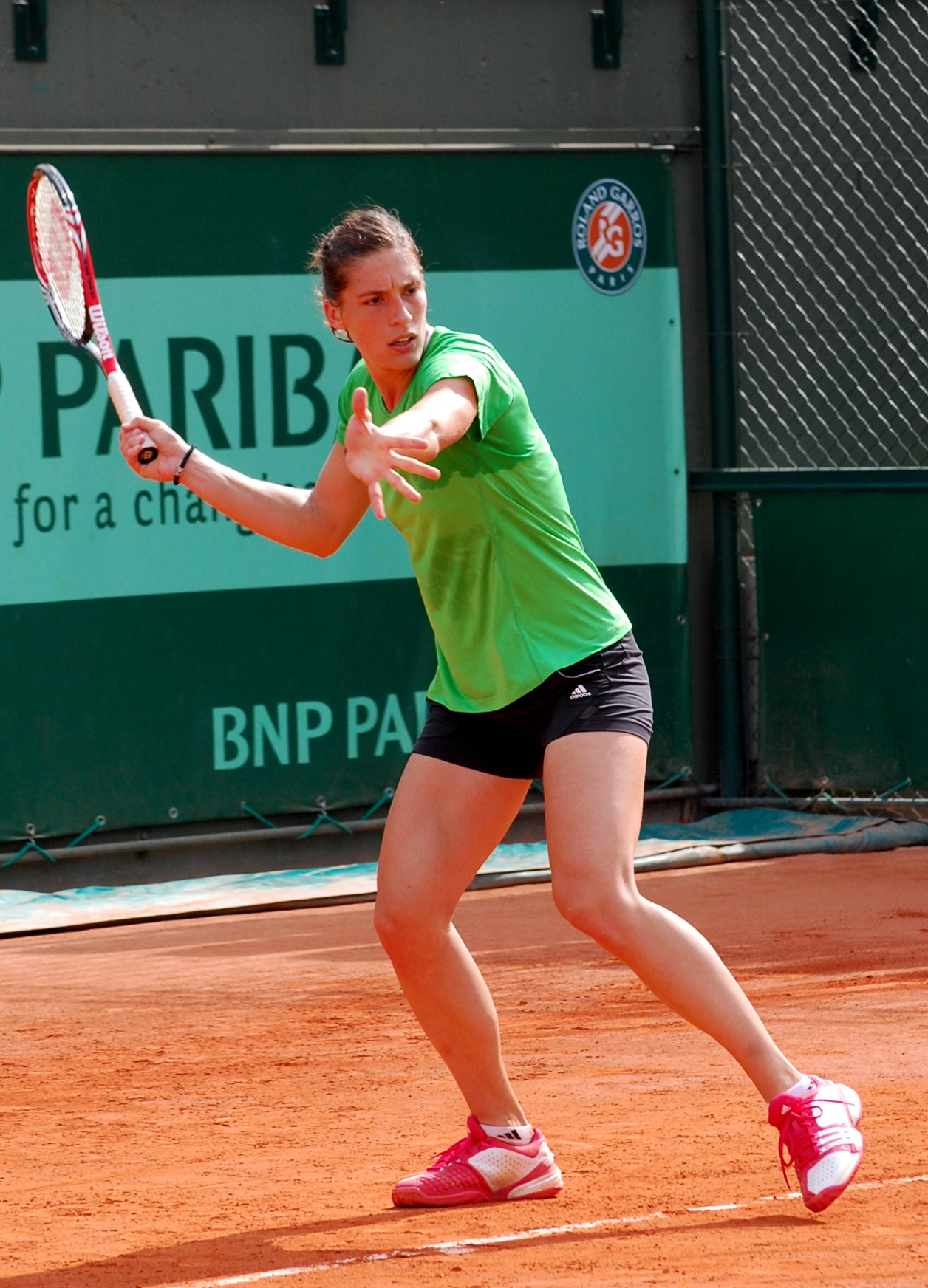
Petkovic practicing at the French Open in 2011

Petkovic won her second WTA Tour title in Strasbourg, defeating Marion Bartoli by retirement in the second set. After that performance, Petkovic reached her new career-high ranking of No. 12 as of 23 May 2011.

As the 15th seed, Petkovic reached the quarterfinals of the French Open.

In August, coach Dušan Vemić joined the team. Petkovic became the sixth German player in history to crack the top 10 by winning her opening match at the Southern California Open in San Diego against American player Alexa Glatch.

At the US Open, Petkovic was seeded tenth. She reached her first ever quarterfinals spot at the US Open against the world No. 1, Caroline Wozniacki. She performed her trademark dance to delight the audience after her fourth round win. On 8 September she lost to Wozniacki.

Seeded ninth at the China Open, Petkovic reached the final, where she lost to Agnieszka Radwańska. It was her last match of the year. She was seeded second at the Linz Open in October but withdrew before the tournament began, citing a right knee injury. In 2011, Petkovic reached her highest ranking alongside her then coaching staff (Popovic/Vemić).

=== 2012: Injuries and out of top 100 ===
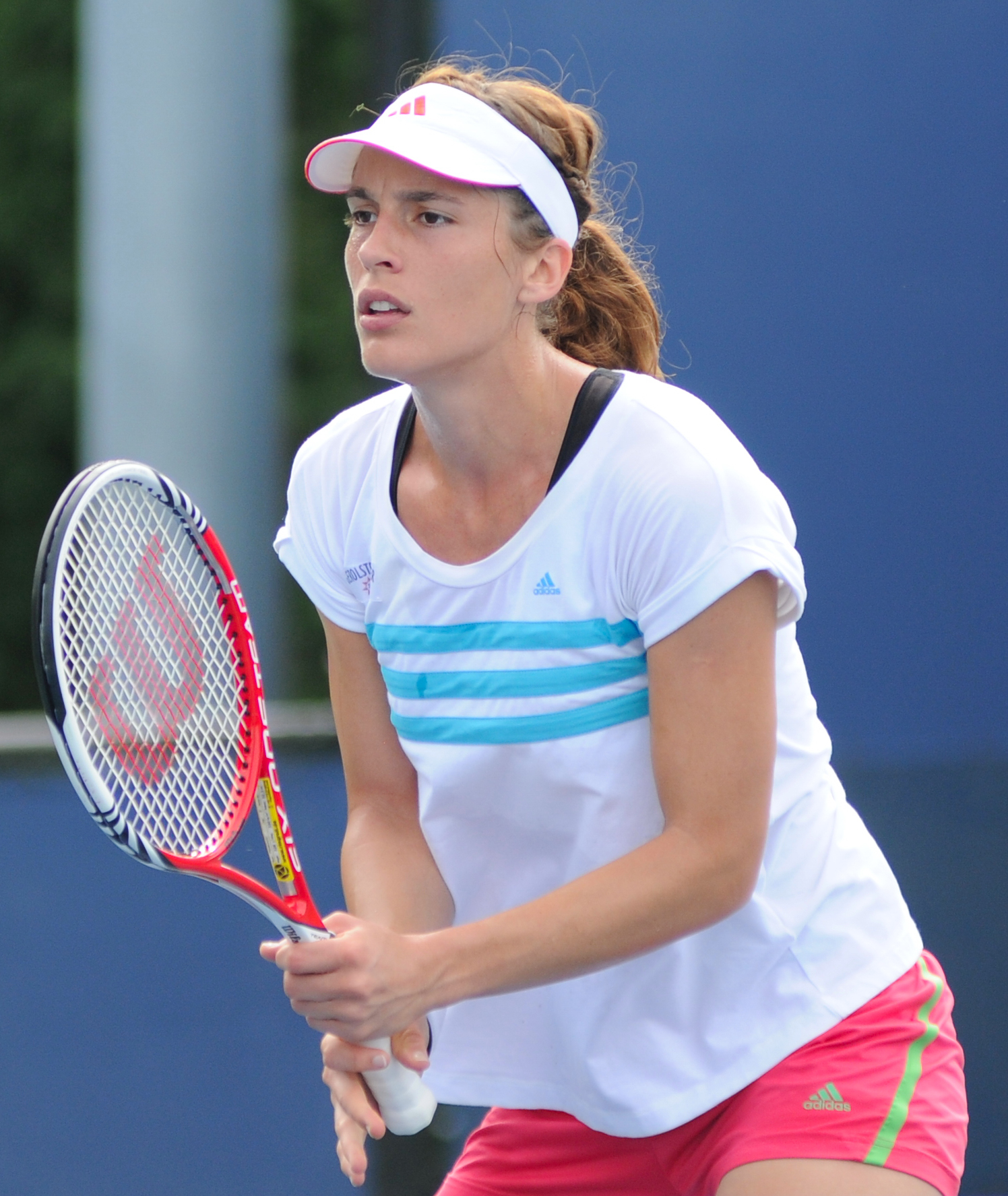
Petkovic at the US Open in 2012

Her first tournament of 2012 was the Brisbane International in January. Seeded second, she reached the quarterfinal before losing to eventual winner Kaia Kanepi. Petkovic then played at the Sydney International the following week, where she lost to Agnieszka Radwańska in the second round. During the match, Petkovic received treatment for what was revealed the following day to be a double stress fracture of her spine and a spinal disc herniation. She explained: "I've been having some back problems for the last three or four months. I've been struggling with it, but I've always believed it was going to be fine and so I pushed through the pain. The last two weeks in Australia I've been having bigger problems and I could only play for 30–45 minutes without pain." As a result, Petkovic withdrew from the Australian Open the following week, where she would have been seeded 10th. The injury ultimately kept her out for three months.

Petkovic made her comeback in a Fed Cup match in April, losing to Samantha Stosur. She then played at the Porsche Tennis Grand Prix in Stuttgart. In her second round match against Victoria Azarenka, Petkovic was down 2–6 and 4–4 when she rolled her right ankle. She was forced out with what was later revealed to be torn ankle ligaments, which required surgery and kept her out for another four months, including the French Open, Wimbledon, and the London Olympics. She said of the injury: "I knew immediately that it was bad because I heard everything crack. I tried to pull my foot up, and it just flopped there. The first thing I thought was: 'Don't cry. Don't cry. Don't cry.' With 4,000 people watching. In Germany." She attended weeks of rehabilitation to rebuild the muscles in her leg, working seven hours a day, five days a week.

Ahead of her return to the tour, Petkovic was worried that she had fallen behind: "I was really scared that I would not be able to compete with the top players and that I might not be able to get back to where I was. Your expectations once you were in the top 10 are to be back in the top 10. Not to be in the top 30 – you're not going to be satisfied with that. I'm definitely scared of that." Petkovic made her second comeback of the year at the New Haven Open in mid-August, reaching the second round. At her next three tournaments, the US Open in August, the Pan Pacific Open in September and the China Open in October, Petkovic was eliminated in the first round, by Romina Oprandi, Petra Martić, and Jelena Janković, respectively. After her defeat in China, Petkovic fell to world rank 192, her lowest since March 2009. She received a wildcard for the Generali Ladies Linz in October, beating Záhlavová-Strýcová in the first round and losing to Ana Ivanovic in the second round. She had much more success in her final two tournaments of the year, reaching the semifinals of the Luxembourg Open and the Royal Indian Open By this time, her world ranking had risen to 126.

Petkovic's final match of 2012 was on 29 December in the 2013 Hopman Cup against Ashleigh Barty. She won the first set 6–4 but appeared to be suffering from a knee injury late on in the set. She received treatment for it before the second set but could not continue and retired from the match in tears.

=== 2013: Comeback from injury; two WTA Tour finals ===
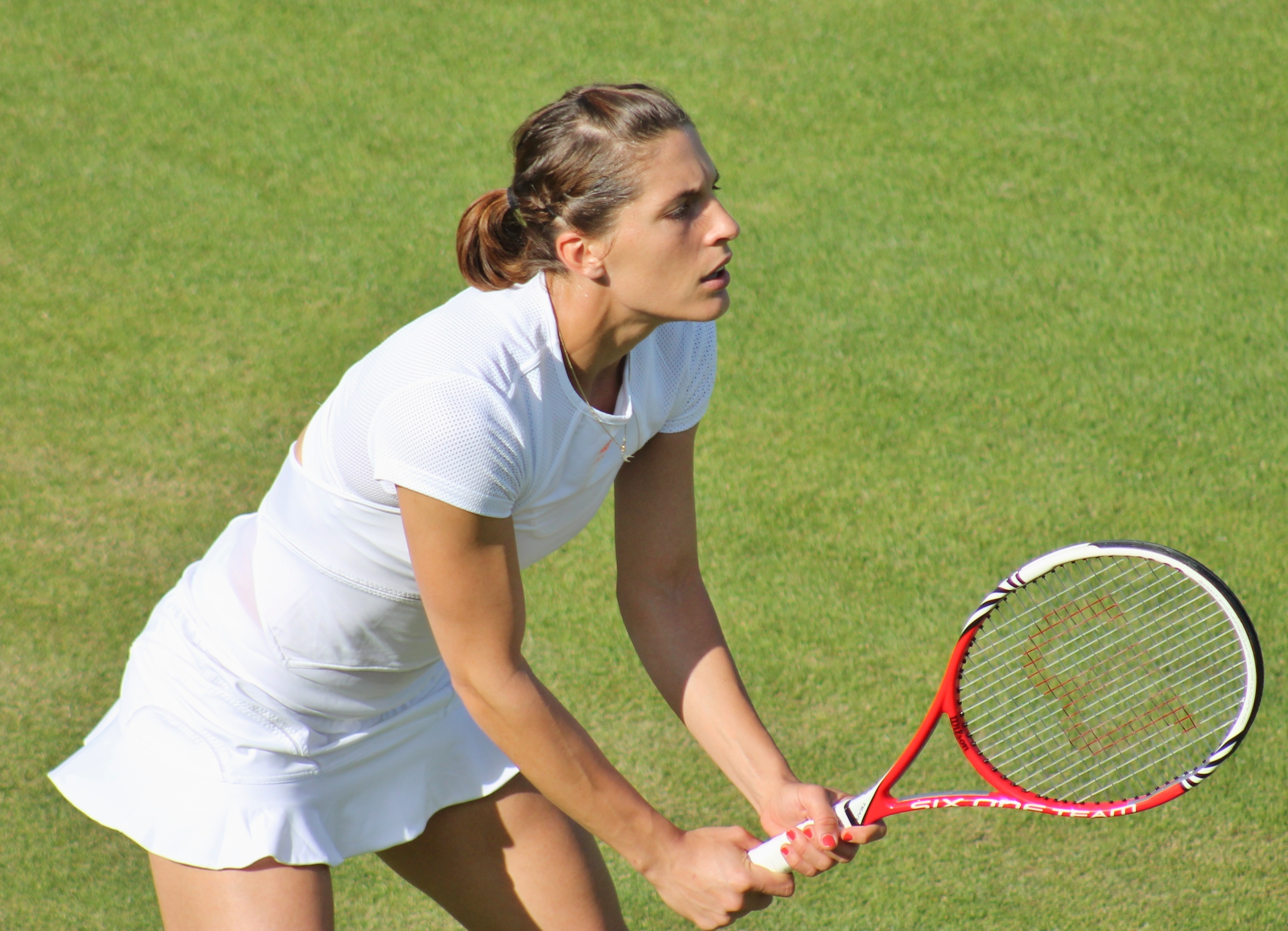
Petkovic at Wimbledon in 2013

The injury was identified as a ruptured meniscus in her right knee, the second time in two years she had suffered the injury, and she underwent surgery on it in early January. She said of the injury: "My team and I are actually managing to take it tragically funny... Everything bad that could happen, happened to me. So nothing surprises me anymore. I'm quite relieved it wasn't the ACL because it was a very similar pain and very similar symptoms to what I had in 2008 when I had my ACL torn in Australia. I'm just hoping for a quick recovery. I would so much appreciate if I could be back on court after three or four weeks." Having suffered from a third serious injury in less than a year, Petkovic considered retiring. "I did actually ask for a few internships. I asked a few magazines if I could do an internship. I asked a few politicians that I know if I could do an internship. They all told me you can come whenever you want, and you can stay as long as you want. But I never really wanted."

She returned to the tour in March, having fallen back to world No. 177, entering the qualifiers for the Indian Wells Open and losing in the second qualifying round. Petkovic then received a wildcard for the Miami Masters, where she reached the third round. She also received a wildcard for the Family Circle Cup in April, where she also reached the third round. She was due to face Caroline Wozniacki but withdrew before the match with a calf injury. It had been causing her discomfort since her loss to Tomljanović, so she withdrew as a precaution, noting her recent experience with injuries.

Her next tournaments were the Porsche Tennis Grand Prix in Stuttgart, where she received a wildcard and lost in the first round to Ana Ivanovic; and the Madrid Open in May, where she lost in the first qualifying round to Bethanie Mattek-Sands. She then lost in the second qualifying round of the French Open. After that defeat, her ranking fell back down to world No. 138 and she again contemplated retirement, but her coach didn't take her seriously: "He just laughed and a few days later [I] picked up my racquet again." She then received a wildcard for the ITF Open de Marseille in June, which she won without dropping a set, beating Anabel Medina Garrigues in the final. It was her first tournament win for over two years, her last coming when she won the Internationaux de Strasbourg in May 2011. After the win, she re-entered the world top 100 for the first time since September 2012. She also reached the final of the Nürnberger Versicherungscup that same month, after receiving a wildcard. Petkovic received a wildcard for the Wimbledon Championships, making only her second Grand Slam appearance since reaching the quarterfinals of the US Open in 2011. She reached the second round.

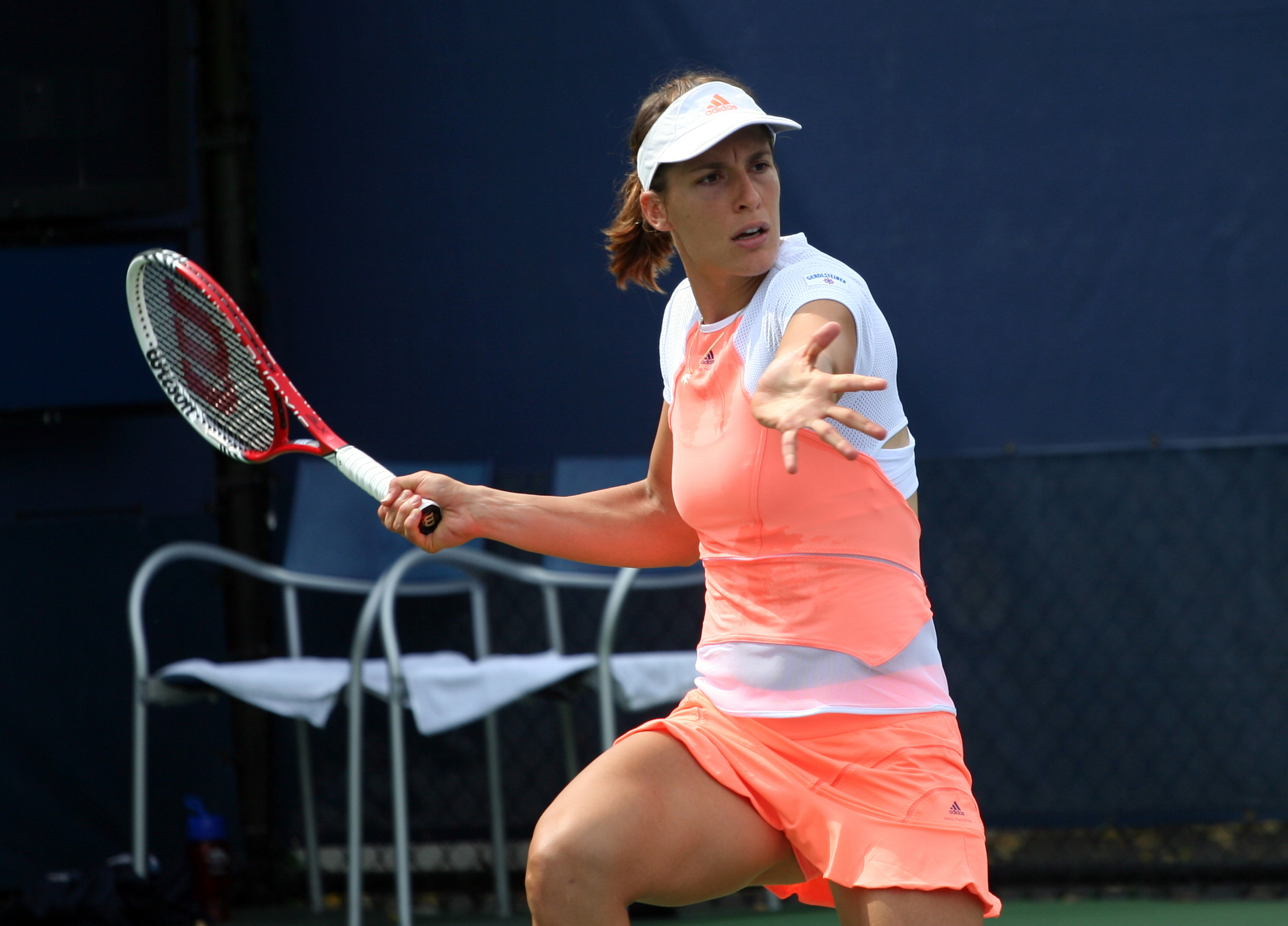
Petkovic at the US Open in 2013

After a defeat to Petra Martić at the Gastein Ladies on 16 July, Petkovic traveled to America for the US Open Series. Her first tournament was the Washington Open at the end of July, where she reached the final, losing to defending champion, Magdaléna Rybáriková.

At the end of September, she took part in the China Open, where she reached the third round.

=== 2014: Return to form; first Grand Slam semifinal and three titles ===
Petkovic started the year in Brisbane where she defeated Bethanie Mattek-Sands before losing to Serena Williams. At the Australian Open, she lost in first round to Magdaléna Rybáriková.

In the first round of the Fed Cup World Group, Petkovic defeated Dominika Cibulková, the reigning Australian Open finalist, and contributed to a 3–1 win for Germany.

After losing in results in Asia (Doha and Dubai) and also both Indian Wells and Miami, Petkovic won her third WTA title in Charleston.

Petkovic then played again in the Fed Cup where she defeated Grand Slam champion Samantha Stosur. With that win, she helped Germany into the 2014 Fed Cup final for the first time since 1992 when they won the title.

After that, she played four tournaments on clay to prepare for the second annual Grand Slam, Roland Garros. She won just one match during the Stuttgart, Madrid, and Rome, before reaching the quarterfinals in Strasbourg.

After a rather mediocre clay season, Petkovic surprisingly reached the semifinals of the French Open. She lost to world No. 4, Simona Halep. Nevertheless, this long run catapulted her back into the world's top 20.

She started the grass court season in 's-Hertogenbosch, where she lost in the second round. At Wimbledon she reached the third round as the 20th seed, losing to another French Open semifinalist and eventual Wimbledon finalist, Eugenie Bouchard. She reached the semi finals in doubles with Magdaléna Rybáriková.

Petkovic then played at the Bad Gastein tournament on clay. There she won her fourth title, beating Shelby Rogers in the final. In Stanford, she beat Venus Williams in the quarterfinals to set up a clash with her sister Serena, but she could not beat both Williams sisters, as Serena ended Petkovic's eight-match winning streak and also won their third match of the year. Next, Petkovic lost in the early rounds of Cincinnati and New Haven. And at the last major of the season, the US Open, she reached the third round, losing to eventual finalist Caroline Wozniacki.

Petkovic played two events in Europe and she won a total of nine matches with only two losses. But she finished the season in style, winning the last tournament of the season – the WTA Tournament of Champions, the tournament for the six players which had not qualified for the WTA Finals, but who had won at least one WTA International tournament. She lost her first match convincingly to Carla Suárez Navarro, but beat Tsvetana Pironkova, Dominika Cibulková, and Garbiñe Muguruza to reach the final. There she beat Flavia Pennetta in three sets for the biggest title of her career.

At the season-ending Fed Cup final, Petkovic lost the opening rubber to Petra Kvitová. Germany went on to lose their first Fed Cup final since 1992, with a final score of 3–1 for the Czech Republic.

Petkovic finished the season for the second time in the top 20, ranked world No. 13.

=== 2015: Return to the top 10 ===
After losing in the first rounds of Brisbane, Sydney, and the Australian Open, Petkovic bounced back at the 2015 Fed Cup World Group by beating Sam Stosur and Jarmila Gajdošová. Due to those two wins, Petkovic helped Germany defeat Australia and reach another semifinal.

She followed her good form by playing at the Diamond Games as the ninth seed, winning the title as Carla Suárez Navarro withdrew due to a neck injury. Kim Clijsters, the tournament director, stepped in unexpectedly at the last moment and beat Andrea in a single set exhibition match. Due to this success, Petkovic broke back into the top 10 for the first time since Miami in 2012.

After receiving a first round bye and suffering an early loss in Indian Wells, she reached the semifinals of the Miami Open for the second time in her career. Petkovic played for Germany in Fed Cup semifinals where they lost to Russia.

Petkovic withdrew from Stuttgart due to a thigh injury. In Madrid, she reached the second round before withdrawing due to illness. In Nürnberg, Petkovic retired in her first-round match against Yulia Putintseva due to injury. She went on to reach the third round at the French Open.

At Wimbledon, she double-bageled Shelby Rogers in the first round. She went on to win against Mariana Duque before losing to Zarina Diyas in the third round.

=== 2016 ===
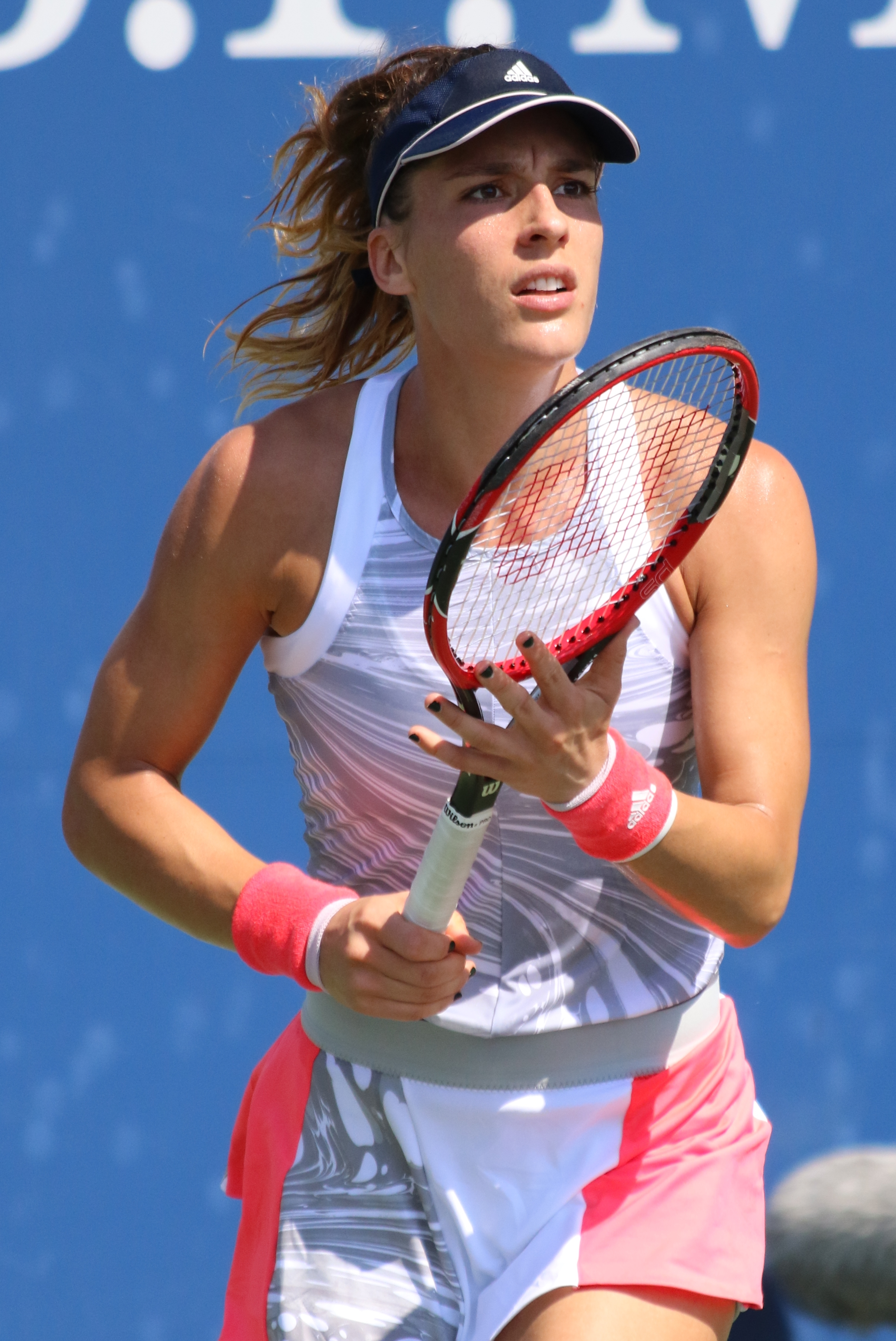
Petkovic at the 2016 US Open

Petkovic began the year at the Brisbane International where she reached the quarterfinals. At the Australian Open, Petkovic was the 22nd seed; she lost in the first round to Elizaveta Kulichkova. After the Australian Open, she represented Germany as they lost to Switzerland in the 2016 Fed Cup World Group. After reaching the quarterfinals in the Dubai Championships, Petkovic played in the Qatar Open, where she reached the semi finals, beating Garbiñe Muguruza en route. Her win over Muguruza was the first against a top-five player since 2013. However, Petkovic had to retire in her match against Jeļena Ostapenko due to a left thigh injury.

=== 2017 ===
Petkovic represented Germany in 2017 Hopman Cup alongside Alexander Zverev, where they finished second in Group A.

In Hobart, Petkovic lost in second round to Verónica Cepede Royg. At the Australian Open, she lost in second round to Barbora Strýcová.

At the French Open, she lost in the first round to Varvara Lepchenko.

=== 2018 ===
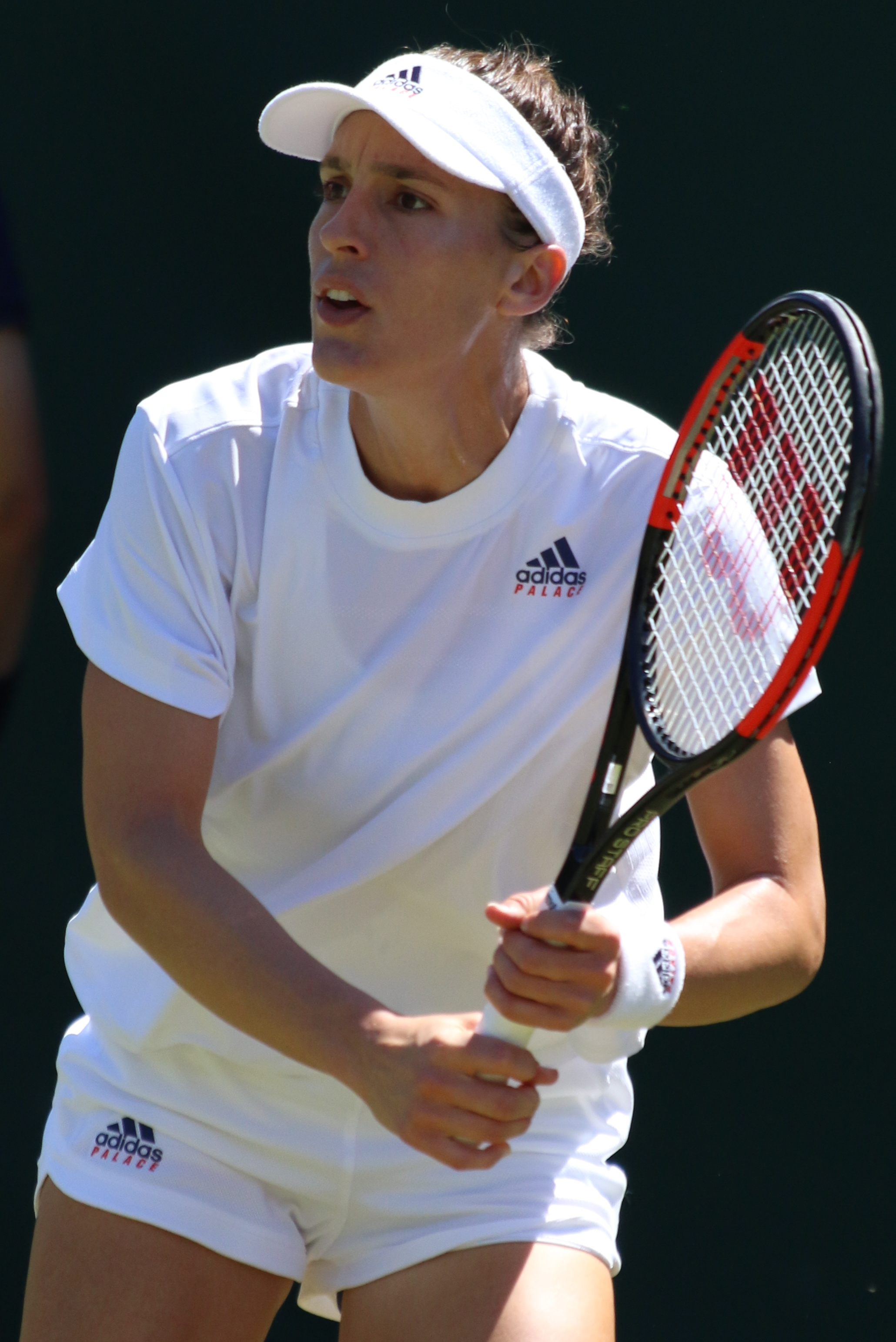
Petkovic at the 2018 Wimbledon Championships

At the Australian Open, Petkovic defeated Petra Kvitová in the first round in a match lasting almost three hours. In the second round, she lost to Lauren Davis without winning a single game during the second and third set.

At the French Open, Petkovic defeated Kristina Mladenovic and Bethanie Mattek-Sands before losing to Simona Halep in the third round.

At Wimbledon, she defeated Zhang Shuai but then lost to Yanina Wickmayer in the second round.

In Washington, she defeated two seeded players Sloane Stephens and Belinda Bencic, before losing to Svetlana Kuznetsova in the semifinals. At US Open, she lost in the first round to Jeļena Ostapenko.

Petkovic reached semifinals in Linz, and lost to qualifier Ekaterina Alexandrova. At Luxembourg Open, she lost in quarterfinals to a qualifier Eugenie Bouchard.

=== 2019-2020: Loss of form, hiatus, out of top 100 ===
Petkovic started her 2019 season at the Brisbane International where she lost in the final round of qualifying to Harriet Dart. At the Australian Open, she retired from her first-round match against Irina-Camelia Begu.

Petkovic played for Germany in Fed Cup against Belarus, she lost her singles match against Aryna Sabalenka.

At the US Open, she upset Kvitová in the second round in straight sets, only her third top-ten win since 2016, but lost in the next round to Elise Mertens.

In September 2020, she returned to the WTA Tour, after an extended absence of almost a year, at the 2020 French Open where she lost in the first round to Bulgarian Tsvetana Pironkova. She finished the year 2020 ranked No. 102, having played only one match on WTA level.

=== 2021: Return to top 100, first WTA Tour title since 2015 ===
Petkovic started off her 2021 season at the Gippsland Trophy where she lost in the second round to the third seed Elina Svitolina in straight sets. She wouldn't record another match win until Miami including a first-round loss at the Australian Open to Ons Jabeur. In Miami, she defeated Zhang Shuai in straight sets before losing to fourth seed Sofia Kenin. This was the start of a five match losing-streak in main draws which lasted the entire clay-court season. She reached the second round at Bad Homburg and at Wimbledon losing to Amanda Anisimova and Barbora Krejčíková, respectively. Petkovic's season started to turn once, she returned to her best surface - clay. She reached her first final in six years at the Hamburg Open. However, she was upset by qualifier Elena-Gabriela Ruse. She also made the semifinals in Belgrade losing to eventual runner up Arantxa Rus. She then won the Winners Open in Cluj-Napoca, Romania, defeating Mayar Sherif to claim her first WTA Tour title since Antwerp in 2015 and her seventh career title.

=== 2022: Retirement ===
On 28 August, Petkovic announced that she would retire from professional tennis after the US Open or a European tournament afterwards. In the first round of the US Open, she lost to Belinda Bencic in three sets.

== Career statistics ==
=== Grand Slam singles performance timeline ===
Key
W	F	SF	QF	#R	RR	Q#	DNQ	A	NH

(W) winner; (F) finalist; (SF) semifinalist; (QF) quarterfinalist; (#R) rounds 4, 3, 2, 1; (RR) round-robin stage; (Q#) qualification round; (DNQ) did not qualify; (A) absent; (NH) not held; (SR) strike rate (events won / competed); (W–L) win–loss record.
To avoid confusion and double counting, these charts are updated at the conclusion of a tournament or when the player's participation has ended.

Tournament	2007	2008	2009	2010	2011	2012	2013	2014	2015	2016	2017	2018	2019	2020	2021	2022	SR	W–L	Win %
Australian Open	A	1R	2R	2R	QF	A	A	1R	1R	1R	2R	2R	1R	A	1R	1R	0 / 12	8–12	40%
French Open	2R	A	Q1	2R	QF	A	Q2	SF	3R	2R	1R	3R	3R	1R	1R	2R	0 / 12	19–12	61%
Wimbledon	Q1	A	Q2	1R	3R	A	2R	3R	3R	2R	1R	2R	1R	NH	2R	1R	0 / 11	10–11	48%
US Open	2R	A	1R	4R^{[1]}	QF	1R	1R	3R	3R	2R	1R	1R	3R	A	2R	1R	0 / 14	15–14	52%
Win–loss	2–2	0–1	1–2	4–4	14–4	0–1	1–2	9–4	6–4	3–4	1–4	4–4	4–4	0–1	2–4	1–4	0 / 49	52–49	51%
