= Lucie Hradecká career statistics =

Career finals
Discipline	Type	Won	Lost	Total
Singles	Grand Slam	–	–	0
Singles	WTA Finals	–	–	0
Singles	WTA 1000	–	–	0
Singles	WTA 500	–	–	0
Singles	WTA 250	–	7	7
Singles	Olympics	–	–	0
Singles	Total	0	7	7
Doubles	Grand Slam	2	4	6
Doubles	WTA Finals	–	1	1
Doubles	WTA 1000	3	2	5
Doubles	WTA 500	2	6	8
Doubles	WTA 250	19	14	33
Doubles	Olympics	–	–	0
Doubles	Total	26	27	53
Mixed	Grand Slam	1	2	3
Mixed	Olympics	–	–	0
Mixed	Total	1	2	3

This is a list of the main career statistics of professional Czech tennis player Lucie Hradecká.

== Performance timelines ==
Key
W	F	SF	QF	#R	RR	Q#	P#	DNQ	A	Z#	PO	G	S	B	NMS	NTI	P	NH

(W) winner; (F) finalist; (SF) semifinalist; (QF) quarterfinalist; (#R) rounds 4, 3, 2, 1; (RR) round-robin stage; (Q#) qualification round; (P#) preliminary round; (DNQ) did not qualify; (A) absent; (Z#) Davis/Fed Cup Zonal Group (with number indication) or (PO) play-off; (G) gold, (S) silver or (B) bronze Olympic/Paralympic medal; (NMS) not a Masters tournament; (NTI) not a Tier I tournament; (P) postponed; (NH) not held; (SR) strike rate (events won / competed); (W–L) win–loss record.
To avoid confusion and double counting, these charts are updated at the conclusion of a tournament or when the player's participation has ended.

Only main-draw results in WTA Tour, Grand Slam tournaments, Billie Jean King Cup, United Cup, Hopman Cup and Olympic Games are included in win–loss records.

=== Singles ===
Current through the 2021 Wimbledon.

Tournament	2005	2006	2007	2008	2009	2010	2011	2012	2013	2014	2015	2016	2017	2018	2019	2020	2021	SR	W–L	Win%
Grand Slam tournaments
Australian Open	A	Q1	Q1	Q1	Q1	1R	1R	2R	2R	2R	3R	1R	Q2	A	Q2	A	A	0 / 7	5–7	42%
French Open	A	Q3	A	Q1	2R	1R	2R	1R	1R	Q1	2R	1R	Q3	A	A	A	A	0 / 7	3–7	30%
Wimbledon	Q1	Q1	A	Q1	1R	1R	1R	1R	1R	Q2	1R	Q1	A	A	A	NH	A	0 / 6	0–6	0%
US Open	Q2	A	Q2	Q3	1R	1R	1R	2R	1R	Q1	1R	Q2	Q2	Q1	A	A	A	0 / 6	1–6	14%
Win–Loss	0–0	0–0	0–0	0–0	1–3	0–4	1–4	2–4	1–4	1–1	3–4	0–2	0–0	0–0	0–0	0–0	0–0	0 / 26	9–26	26%
National representation
Summer Olympics	Not Held			A	Not Held			A	Not Held			1R	Not Held				A	0 / 1	0–1	0%
WTA 1000 tournaments
Qatar Open	Not Tier I			A	Not Held		NTI	A	A	A	NTI	1R	NTI	A	NTI	Q1	NTI	0 / 1	0–1	0%
Dubai Championships	Not Tier I				A	A	A	Not Tier I			A	NTI	Q1	NTI	1R	NTI	Q1	0 / 1	0–1	0%
Indian Wells Open	A	A	A	A	Q2	1R	3R	1R	1R	A	2R	2R	Q2	A	A	NH	A	0 / 6	4–6	40%
Miami Open	A	A	A	A	Q1	1R	2R	1R	1R	A	Q2	2R	Q1	A	A	NH	A	0 / 5	2–5	29%
Madrid Open	Not Held				A	A	A	SF	Q1	A	A	Q1	A	A	A	NH	A	0 / 1	4–1	80%
Italian Open	A	A	A	A	A	A	A	A	A	A	1R	A	A	A	A	A	A	0 / 1	0–1	0%
Canadian Open	A	A	A	A	Q2	1R	1R	A	A	A	Q1	A	A	A	Q1	NH	A	0 / 2	0–2	0%
Cincinnati Open	Not Tier I				A	Q2	1R	Q1	A	A	1R	A	A	A	A	A	A	0 / 2	0–2	0%
Wuhan Open	Not Held									A	Q1	Q1	Q1	A	A	Not Held		0 / 0	0–0	–
China Open	Not Tier I				A	A	1R	A	A	A	Q2	Q2	A	A	A	Not Held		0 / 1	0–1	0%
Win–Loss																				
Career statistics
Tournaments	0	2	1	3	11	17	20	17	11	3	17	14	3	0	1	0	1	Career total: 121		
Titles	0	0	0	0	0	0	0	0	0	0	0	0	0	0	0	0	0	Career total: 0		
Finals	0	0	0	1	2	0	1	1	1	0	1	0	0	0	0	0	0	Career total: 7		
Overall Win–Loss	0–0	1–2	0–1	4–3	14–11	6–19	16–20	18–18	5–11	3–3	17–17	5–14	4–3	0–0	0–1	0–0	0–1	0 / 121	93–124	43%
Win %	–	33%	0%	57%	56%	24%	44%	50%	31%	50%	50%	26%	57%	–	0%	–	0%	Career total: 43%		
Year-end ranking	204	174	241	119	65	111	51	46	150	157	53	170	184	740	300	490	565	$6,014,015		

=== Doubles ===
Tournament	2005	2006	2007	2008	2009	2010	2011	2012	2013	2014	2015	2016	2017	2018	2019	2020	2021	2022	SR	W–L	Win%
Grand Slam tournaments
Australian Open	A	A	1R	1R	2R	3R	2R	SF	2R	3R	3R	F	1R	A	2R	1R	2R	2R	0 / 15	21–15	58%
French Open	A	1R	1R	2R	1R	3R	W	SF	SF	SF	SF	QF	SF	1R	3R	1R	3R	3R	1 / 17	38–16	70%
Wimbledon	A	3R	1R	1R	1R	2R	1R	F	QF	2R	2R	3R	3R	3R	1R	NH	QF	1R	0 / 16	21–16	57%
US Open	A	1R	1R	2R	2R	1R	QF	F	W	3R	3R	3R	F	QF	1R	2R	QF	2R	1 / 17	35–16	69%
Win–Loss	0–0	1–3	0–4	2–4	2–4	5–4	10–3	18–4	14–3	9–4	9–4	12–4	11–4	5–3	3–4	1–3	9–4	4–4	2 / 65	115–63	65%
Olympic Games
Summer Olympics	NH			A	Not Held			F–S	NH			4th	NH				A		0 / 2	7–3	70%
Year-end championships
WTA Finals	DNQ							F	DNQ		SF	QF	A	DNQ		NH	Alt		0 / 3	2–5	29%
WTA 1000 tournaments
Qatar Open	Not Tier I			A	Not Held		NTI	A	A	A	NTI	1R	NTI	A	NTI	2R	NTI	SF	0 / 3	4–3	50%
Dubai Championships	Not Tier I				A	A	A	Not Tier I			A	NTI	1R	NTI	F	NTI	1R	NTI	0 / 3	2–3	50%
Indian Wells Open	A	A	SF	A	1R	2R	1R	SF	2R	SF	2R	QF	F	A	1R	NH	QF	QF (Note: Withdraw before quarterfinal-match.)	0 / 13	22–12	65%
Miami Open	A	A	A	2R	1R	1R	1R	1R	1R	1R	SF	QF	1R	A	1R	NH	1R	1R	0 / 13	6–13	32%
Madrid Open	Not Held				A	A	A	2R	2R	A	1R	QF	QF	A	A	NH	1R	A	0 / 6	4–6	40%
Italian Open	A	A	A	2R	A	A	A	A	A	A	2R	SF	A	A	A	QF	2R	SF	0 / 5	7–5	58%
Canadian Open	A	A	A	A	2R	2R	QF	A	A	A	1R	A	1R	A	1R	NH	A	A	0 / 6	4–5	44%
Cincinnati Open	Not Tier I				A	2R	2R	W	A	1R	1R	A	1R	W	W	SF	1R	2R	3 / 11	19–8	70%
China Open	Not Tier I				A	A	2R	A	A	A	QF	1R	A	SF	A	Not Held			0 / 4	6–4	60%
Wuhan Open	Not Held									A	SF	2R	A	2R	A	Not Held			0 / 3	4–3	57%
Guadalajara Open	Not Held																	1R	0 / 1	0–1	0%
Win–Loss																					
Career statistics
Tournaments	7	7	11	12	17	18	19	16	13	12	23	19	15	7	12	12	23	20	Career total: 263		
Titles	0	1	2	2	2	2	2	4	2	1	1	2	0	1	1	1	2	0	Career total: 26		
Finals	0	2	2	2	3	3	4	9	3	3	5	3	5	1	2	2	3	2	Career total: 54		
Overall Win–Loss	4–7	7–6	15–9	16–9	22–15	25–15	30–16	47–12	25–11	23–12	42–24	35–17	27–15	15–6	12–11	15–11	29–22	27–19	26 / 263	400–228	64%
Year-end ranking	87	53	67	51	42	38	15	4	14	22	17	10	14	32	28	32	29				

== Grand Slam tournament finals ==
=== Doubles: 6 (2 titles, 4 runner-ups) ===
Result	Year	Tournament	Surface	Partner	Opponents	Score
Win	2011	French Open	Clay	(Czech Republic) Andrea Hlaváčková	(India) Sania Mirza (Russia) Elena Vesnina	6–4, 6–3
Loss	2012	Wimbledon	Grass	(Czech Republic) Andrea Hlaváčková	(United States) Serena Williams (United States) Venus Williams	5–7, 4–6
Loss	2012	US Open	Hard	(Czech Republic) Andrea Hlaváčková	(Italy) Sara Errani (Italy) Roberta Vinci	4–6, 2–6
Win	2013	US Open	Hard	(Czech Republic) Andrea Hlaváčková	(Australia) Ashleigh Barty (Australia) Casey Dellacqua	6–7^{(4–7)}, 6–1, 6–4
Loss	2016	Australian Open	Hard	(Czech Republic) Andrea Hlaváčková	(Switzerland) Martina Hingis (India) Sania Mirza	6–7^{(1–7)}, 3–6
Loss	2017	US Open	Hard	(Czech Republic) Kateřina Siniaková	(Chinese Taipei) Chan Yung-jan (Switzerland) Martina Hingis	3–6, 2–6

=== Mixed doubles: 3 (1 title, 2 runner-ups) ===
Result	Year	Tournament	Surface	Partner	Opponents	Score
Loss	2013	Australian Open	Hard	(Czech Republic) František Čermák	(Australia) Jarmila Gajdošová (Australia) Matthew Ebden	3–6, 5–7
Win	2013	French Open	Clay	(Czech Republic) František Čermák	(France) Kristina Mladenovic (Canada) Daniel Nestor	1–6, 6–4, [10–6]
Loss	2015	French Open	Clay	(Poland) Marcin Matkowski	(United States) Bethanie Mattek-Sands (United States) Mike Bryan	6–7^{(3–7)}, 1–6

== Other significant finals ==
=== Year-end championships ===
==== Doubles: 1 (runner-up) ====
Result	Year	Tournament	Surface	Partner	Opponents	Score
Loss	2012	WTA Finals, Istanbul	Hard (i)	(Czech Republic) Andrea Hlaváčková	(Russia) Maria Kirilenko (Russia) Nadia Petrova	1–6, 4–6

=== WTA Premier Mandatory & 5 tournaments ===
==== Doubles: 5 (3 titles, 2 runner-ups) ====
Result	Year	Tournament	Surface	Partner	Opponents	Score
Win	2012	Cincinnati Open	Hard	(Czech Republic) Andrea Hlaváčková	(Slovenia) Katarina Srebotnik (China) Zheng Jie	6–1, 6–3
Loss	2017	Indian Wells Open	Hard	(Czech Republic) Kateřina Siniaková	(Chinese Taipei) Chan Yung-jan (Switzerland) Martina Hingis	6–7^{(4–7)}, 2–6
Win	2018	Cincinnati Open (2)	Hard	(Russia) Ekaterina Makarova	(Belgium) Elise Mertens (Netherlands) Demi Schuurs	6–2, 7–5
Loss	2019	Dubai Championships	Hard	(Russia) Ekaterina Makarova	(Chinese Taipei) Hsieh Su-wei (Czech Republic) Barbora Strýcová	4–6, 4–6
Win	2019	Cincinnati Open (3)	Hard	(Slovenia) Andreja Klepač	(Germany) Anna-Lena Grönefeld (Netherlands) Demi Schuurs	6–4, 6–1

=== Summer Olympics ===
==== Doubles: 2 (1 silver medal) ====
Result	Year	Tournament	Surface	Partner	Opponents	Score
Silver	2012	London Summer Olympics	Grass	(Czech Republic) Andrea Hlaváčková	(United States) Serena Williams (United States) Venus Williams	4–6, 4–6
4th place	2016	Rio Summer Olympics	Hard	(Czech Republic) Andrea Hlaváčková	(Czech Republic) Lucie Šafářová (Czech Republic) Barbora Strýcová	5–7, 1–6

==== Mixed doubles: 1 (bronze medal) ====
Result	Year	Tournament	Surface	Partner	Opponents	Score
Bronze	2016	Rio Summer Olympics	Hard	(Czech Republic) Radek Štěpánek	(India) Sania Mirza (India) Rohan Bopanna	6–1, 7–5

== WTA Tour finals ==
=== Singles: 7 (7 runner-ups) ===
Legend
Tier III / International (0–7)

Result	W–L	Date	Tournament	Tier	Surface	Opponent	Score
Loss	0–1	Jul 2008	Gastein Ladies, Austria	Tier III	Clay	(France) Pauline Parmentier	4–6, 4–6
Loss	0–2	May 2009	Internationaux de Strasbourg, France	International	Clay	(France) Aravane Rezaï	6–7^{(2–7)}, 1–6
Loss	0–3	Aug 2009	İstanbul Cup, Turkey	International	Hard	(Russia) Vera Dushevina	0–6, 1–6
Loss	0–4	Apr 2011	Barcelona Ladies Open, Spain	International	Clay	(Italy) Roberta Vinci	6–4, 2–6, 2–6
Loss	0–5	Sep 2012	Tournoi de Québec, Canada	International	Carpet (i)	(Belgium) Kirsten Flipkens	1–6, 5–7
Loss	0–6	May 2013	Internationaux de Strasbourg, France	International	Clay	(France) Alizé Cornet	6–7^{(4–7)}, 0–6
Loss	0–7	May 2015	Prague Open, Czech Republic	International	Clay	(Czech Republic) Karolína Plíšková	6–4, 5–7, 3–6

=== Doubles: 53 (26 titles, 27 runner-ups) ===
Legend Grand Slam (2–4) WTA Tour Championships (0–1) Premier M & Premier 5 (3–2) Premier / WTA 500 (2–6) Tier III & IV / International / WTA 250 (19–14)	Finals by surface Hard (15–17) Grass (1–2) Clay (8–7) Carpet (2–1)

Result	W–L	Date	Tournament	Tier	Surface	Partner	Opponents	Score
Loss	0–1	Jul 2006	Budapest Grand Prix, Hungary	Tier IV	Hard	(Czech Republic) Renata Voráčová	(Slovakia) Janette Husárová (Netherlands) Michaëlla Krajicek	6–4, 4–6, 4–6
Win	1–1	Sep 2006	Slovenia Open, Slovenia	Tier IV	Hard (i)	(Czech Republic) Renata Voráčová	(Czech Republic) Eva Birnerová (France) Émilie Loit	w/o
Win	2–1	Jul 2007	Gastein Ladies, Austria	Tier III	Clay	(Czech Republic) Renata Voráčová	(Hungary) Ágnes Szávay (Czech Republic) Vladimíra Uhlířová	6–3, 7–5
Win	3–1	Sep 2007	Slovenia Open, Slovenia (2)	Tier IV	Hard (i)	(Czech Republic) Renata Voráčová	(Slovenia) Andreja Klepač (Russia) Elena Likhovtseva	5–7, 6–4, [10–7]
Win	4–1	May 2008	Prague Open, Czech Republic	Tier IV	Clay	(Czech Republic) Andrea Hlaváčková	(United States) Jill Craybas (Netherlands) Michaëlla Krajicek	1–6, 6–3, [10–6]
Win	5–1	Jul 2008	Gastein Ladies, Austria (2)	Tier III	Clay	(Czech Republic) Andrea Hlaváčková	(Bulgaria) Sesil Karatantcheva (Serbia) Nataša Zorić	6–3, 6–3
Win	6–1	Jul 2009	Gastein Ladies, Austria (3)	International	Hard	(Czech Republic) Andrea Hlaváčková	(Germany) Tatjana Malek (Germany) Andrea Petkovic	6–2, 6–4
Win	7–1	Aug 2009	İstanbul Cup, Turkey	International	Hard	(Czech Republic) Renata Voráčová	(Germany) Julia Görges (Switzerland) Patty Schnyder	2–6, 6–3, [12–10]
Loss	7–2	Aug 2009	Connecticut Open, United States	Premier	Hard	(Czech Republic) Iveta Benešová	(Spain) Nuria Llagostera Vives (Spain) María José Martínez Sánchez	2–6, 5–7
Win	8–2	Jan 2010	Brisbane International, Australia	International	Hard	(Czech Republic) Andrea Hlaváčková	(Hungary) Melinda Czink (Spain) Arantxa Parra Santonja	2–6, 7–6^{(7–3)}, [10–4]
Loss	8–3	May 2010	Morocco Open, Morocco	International	Clay	(Czech Republic) Renata Voráčová	(Czech Republic) Iveta Benešová (Spain) Anabel Medina Garrigues	3–6, 1–6
Win	9–3	Jul 2010	Gastein Ladies, Austria (4)	International	Clay	(Spain) Anabel Medina Garrigues	(Switzerland) Timea Bacsinszky (Italy) Tathiana Garbin	6–7^{(2–7)}, 6–1, [10–5]
Loss	9–4	Feb 2011	National Indoors, United States	International	Hard (i)	(Czech Republic) Andrea Hlaváčková	(Belarus) Olga Govortsova (Russia) Alla Kudryavtseva	3–6, 6–4, [8–10]
Win	10–4	Jun 2011	French Open, France	Grand Slam	Clay	(Czech Republic) Andrea Hlaváčková	(India) Sania Mirza (Russia) Elena Vesnina	6–4, 6–3
Win	11–4	Jul 2011	Gastein Ladies, Austria (5)	International	Clay	(Czech Republic) Eva Birnerová	(Australia) Jarmila Gajdošová (Germany) Julia Görges	4–6, 6–2, [12–10]
Loss	11–5	Oct 2011	Luxembourg Open, Luxembourg	International	Hard (i)	(Russia) Ekaterina Makarova	(Czech Republic) Iveta Benešová (Czech Republic) Barbora Záhlavová-Strýcová	5–7, 3–6
Win	12–5	Jan 2012	Auckland Open, New Zealand	International	Hard	(Czech Republic) Andrea Hlaváčková	(Germany) Julia Görges (Italy) Flavia Pennetta	6–7^{(2–7)}, 6–2, [10–7]
Win	13–5	Feb 2012	National Indoors, United States	International	Hard (i)	(Czech Republic) Andrea Hlaváčková	(Russia) Vera Dushevina (Belarus) Olga Govortsova	6–3, 6–4
Loss	13–6	Jul 2012	Wimbledon, United Kingdom	Grand Slam	Grass	(Czech Republic) Andrea Hlaváčková	(United States) Serena Williams (United States) Venus Williams	5–7, 4–6
Win	14–6	Aug 2012	Cincinnati Open, United States	Premier 5	Hard	(Czech Republic) Andrea Hlaváčková	(Slovenia) Katarina Srebotnik (China) Zheng Jie	6–1, 6–3
Loss	14–7	Aug 2012	Connecticut Open, United States	Premier	Hard	(Czech Republic) Andrea Hlaváčková	(United States) Liezel Huber (United States) Lisa Raymond	6–4, 0–6, [4–10]
Loss	14–8	Sep 2012	US Open, United States	Grand Slam	Hard	(Czech Republic) Andrea Hlaváčková	(Italy) Sara Errani (Italy) Roberta Vinci	4–6, 2–6
Win	15–8	Oct 2012	Luxembourg Open, Luxembourg	International	Hard (i)	(Czech Republic) Andrea Hlaváčková	(Romania) Irina-Camelia Begu (Romania) Monica Niculescu	6–3, 6–4
Loss	15–9	Oct 2012	WTA Finals, Turkey	Championships	Hard	(Czech Republic) Andrea Hlaváčková	(Russia) Maria Kirilenko (Russia) Nadia Petrova	1–6, 4–6
Win	16–9	Jul 2013	Budapest Grand Prix, Hungary	International	Clay	(Czech Republic) Andrea Hlaváčková	(Russia) Nina Bratchikova (Georgia (country)) Anna Tatishvili	6–4, 6–1
Win	17–9	Sep 2013	US Open, United States	Grand Slam	Hard	(Czech Republic) Andrea Hlaváčková	(Australia) Ashleigh Barty (Australia) Casey Dellacqua	6–7^{(4–7)}, 6–1, 6–4
Loss	17–10	Sep 2013	Tournoi de Québec, Canada	International	Carpet (i)	(Czech Republic) Andrea Hlaváčková	(Russia) Alla Kudryavtseva (Australia) Anastasia Rodionova	4–6, 3–6
Loss	17–11	Jan 2014	Auckland Open, New Zealand	International	Hard	(Netherlands) Michaëlla Krajicek	(Canada) Sharon Fichman (United States) Maria Sanchez	6–2, 0–6, [4–10]
Win	18–11	Sep 2014	Tournoi de Québec, Canada	International	Carpet (i)	(Croatia) Mirjana Lučić-Baroni	(Germany) Julia Görges (Czech Republic) Andrea Hlaváčková	6–3, 7–6^{(10–8)}
Loss	18–12	Oct 2014	Luxembourg Open, Luxembourg	International	Hard (i)	(Czech Republic) Barbora Krejčíková	(Switzerland) Timea Bacsinszky (Germany) Kristina Barrois	6–3, 4–6, [4–10]
Loss	18–13	Feb 2015	Mexican Open, Mexico	International	Hard	(Czech Republic) Andrea Hlaváčková	(Spain) Lara Arruabarrena (Spain) María Teresa Torró Flor	6–7^{(2–7)}, 7–5, [11–13]
Loss	18–14	Jun 2015	Birmingham Classic, United Kingdom	Premier	Grass	(Czech Republic) Andrea Hlaváčková	(Spain) Garbiñe Muguruza (Spain) Carla Suárez Navarro	4–6, 4–6
Loss	18–15	Jul 2015	Gastein Ladies, Austria	International	Clay	(Spain) Lara Arruabarrena	(Montenegro) Danka Kovinić (Liechtenstein) Stephanie Vogt	6–4, 4–6, [3–10]
Win	19–15	Aug 2015	Connecticut Open, United States	Premier	Hard	(Germany) Julia Görges	(Chinese Taipei) Chuang Chia-jung (China) Liang Chen	6–3, 6–1
Loss	19–16	Oct 2015	Linz Open, Austria	International	Hard	(Czech Republic) Andrea Hlaváčková	(United States) Raquel Kops-Jones (United States) Abigail Spears	3–6, 5–7
Loss	19–17	Jan 2016	Australian Open, Australia	Grand Slam	Hard	(Czech Republic) Andrea Hlaváčková	(Switzerland) Martina Hingis (India) Sania Mirza	6–7^{(1–7)}, 3–6
Win	20–17	Sep 2016	Tournoi de Québec, Canada (2)	International	Carpet (i)	(Czech Republic) Andrea Hlaváčková	(Russia) Alla Kudryavtseva (Russia) Alexandra Panova	7–6^{(7–2)},7–6^{(7–2)}
Win	21–17	Oct 2016	Kremlin Cup, Russia	Premier	Hard (i)	(Czech Republic) Andrea Hlaváčková	(Australia) Daria Gavrilova (Russia) Daria Kasatkina	4–6, 6–0, [10–7]
Loss	21–18	Feb 2017	Taiwan Open, Taiwan	International	Hard	(Czech Republic) Kateřina Siniaková	(Chinese Taipei) Chan Hao-ching (Chinese Taipei) Chan Yung-jan	4–6, 2–6
Loss	21–19	Mar 2017	Indian Wells Open, United States	Premier M	Hard	(Czech Republic) Kateřina Siniaková	(Chinese Taipei) Chan Yung-jan (Switzerland) Martina Hingis	6–7^{(4–7)}, 2–6
Loss	21–20	Apr 2017	Charleston Open, United States	Premier	Clay	(Czech Republic) Kateřina Siniaková	(United States) Bethanie Mattek-Sands (Czech Republic) Lucie Šafářová	1–6, 6–4, [7–10]
Loss	21–21	May 2017	Prague Open, Czech Republic	International	Clay	(Czech Republic) Kateřina Siniaková	(Germany) Anna-Lena Grönefeld (Czech Republic) Květa Peschke	4–6, 6–7^{(3–7)}
Loss	21–22	Sep 2017	US Open, United States	Grand Slam	Hard	(Czech Republic) Kateřina Siniaková	(Chinese Taipei) Chan Yung-jan (Switzerland) Martina Hingis	3–6, 2–6
Win	22–22	Aug 2018	Cincinnati Open, United States (2)	Premier 5	Hard	(Russia) Ekaterina Makarova	(Belgium) Elise Mertens (Netherlands) Demi Schuurs	6–2, 7–5
Loss	22–23	Feb 2019	Dubai Championships, UAE	Premier 5	Hard	(Russia) Ekaterina Makarova	(Chinese Taipei) Hsieh Su-wei (Czech Republic) Barbora Strýcová	4–6, 4–6
Win	23–23	Aug 2019	Cincinnati Open, United States (3)	Premier 5	Hard	(Slovenia) Andreja Klepač	(Germany) Anna-Lena Grönefeld (Netherlands) Demi Schuurs	6–4, 6–1
Win	24–23	Aug 2020	Prague Open, Czech Republic (2)	International	Clay	(Czech Republic) Kristýna Plíšková	(Romania) Monica Niculescu (Romania) Raluca Olaru	6–2, 6–2
Loss	24–24	Nov 2020	Linz Open, Austria	International	Hard (i)	(Czech Republic) Kateřina Siniaková	(Netherlands) Arantxa Rus (Slovenia) Tamara Zidanšek	3–6, 4–6
Loss	24–25	Apr 2021	Charleston Open, United States	WTA 500	Clay (green)	(Czech Republic) Marie Bouzková	(United States) Nicole Melichar (Netherlands) Demi Schuurs	2–6, 4–6
Win	25–25	Jun 2021	Birmingham Classic, United Kingdom	WTA 250	Grass	(Czech Republic) Marie Bouzková	(Tunisia) Ons Jabeur (Australia) Ellen Perez	6–4, 2–6, [10–8]
Win	26–25	Jul 2021	Prague Open, Czech Republic (3)	WTA 250	Hard	(Czech Republic) Marie Bouzková	(Slovakia) Viktória Kužmová (Serbia) Nina Stojanović	7–6^{(7–4)}, 6–4
Loss	26–26	Apr 2022	Charleston Open, United States	WTA 500	Clay (green)	(India) Sania Mirza	(Slovenia) Andreja Klepač (Poland) Magda Linette	2–6, 6–4, [7–10]
Loss	26–28	May 2022	Internationaux de Strasbourg, France	WTA 250	Clay	(India) Sania Mirza	(United States) Nicole Melichar-Martinez (Australia) Daria Saville	7–5, 5–7, [6–10]

== ITF Circuit finals ==
=== Singles: 27 (20 titles, 7 runner–ups) ===
Legend
$100,000 tournaments
$80,000 tournaments
$60,000 tournaments
$25,000 tournaments
$15,000 tournaments

Result	W–L	Date	Tournament	Tier	Surface	Opponent	Score
Loss	0–1	May 2003	ITF Pula, Croatia	10,000	Clay	(Hungary) Virág Németh	6–4, 0–6, 1–6
Win	1–1	Aug 2003	ITF Enschede, Netherlands	10,000	Clay	(Netherlands) Lotty Seelen	7–5, 6–4
Loss	1–2	Sep 2003	ITF Mestre, Italy	10,000	Clay	(Czech Republic) Lenka Šnajdrová	3–6, 6–1, 2–6
Win	2–2	Oct 2003	ITF Trenčianske Teplice, Slovakia	10,000	Clay	(Germany) Irina Delitz	6–3, 6–2
Win	3–2	Apr 2004	ITF Cavtat, Croatia	10,000	Clay	(Slovakia) Lenka Tvarošková	7–5, 6–0
Win	4–2	Apr 2004	ITF Bol, Croatia	10,000	Clay	(Italy) Romina Oprandi	6–4, 6–3
Win	5–2	May 2004	ITF Biograd, Croatia	10,000	Clay	(Italy) Lisa Tognetti	6–3, 6–2
Win	6–2	Jun 2004	ITF Staré Splavy, Czech Republic	10,000	Clay	(Germany) Sabrina Jolk	6–1, 7–6^{(3)}
Win	7–2	Sep 2004	ITF Durmersheim, Germany	10,000	Clay	(Austria) Petra Russegger	6–0, 5–7, 7–6^{(1)}
Loss	7–3	Feb 2005	Biberach Open, Germany	10,000	Hard (i)	(Germany) Kristina Barrois	5–7, 4–6
Win	8–3	Mar 2005	ITF Rogaška Slatina, Slovenia	10,000	Carpet (i)	(Sweden) Kristina Andlovic	6–4, 6–2
Win	9–3	Nov 2005	Czech Indoor Open	25,000	Hard (i)	(Poland) Agnieszka Radwańska	4–6, 6–1, 7–6^{(8)}
Loss	9–4	Dec 2005	Přerov Cup, Czech Republic	25,000	Carpet (i)	(Poland) Joanna Sakowicz	4–6, 4–6
Win	10–4	Feb 2006	ITF Capriolo, Italy	25,000	Carpet (i)	(Croatia) Darija Jurak	6–1, 6–4
Win	11–4	May 2007	ITF Gorizia, Italy	25,000	Clay	(Spain) Eloisa Compostizo de Andrés	6–2, 6–3
Loss	11–5	May 2008	ITF Florence, Italy	25,000	Clay	(Australia) Jelena Dokić	1–6, 3–6
Win	12–5	Aug 2008	ITF Bad Saulgau, Germany	25,000	Clay	(Germany) Carmen Klaschka	6–1, 4–6, 6–4
Win	13–5	Feb 2009	ITF Belfort, France	25,000	Carpet (i)	(Russia) Vesna Manasieva	6–3, 6–2
Win	14–5	Feb 2009	Midland Tennis Classic, US	75,000	Hard (i)	(Greece) Eleni Daniilidou	6–3, 6–3
Loss	14–6	Feb 2010	Midland Tennis Classic, US	100,000	Hard (i)	(United Kingdom) Elena Baltacha	7–5, 2–6, 3–6
Win	15–6	May 2010	Prague Open, Czech Republic	50,000	Clay	(Croatia) Ajla Tomljanović	6–1, 7–6^{(4)}
Loss	15–7	Sep 2010	Save Cup Mestre, Italy	50,000	Clay	(Czech Republic) Zuzana Ondrášková	3–6, 3–6
Win	16–7	Nov 2010	Open Nantes Atlantique, France	50,000	Hard (i)	(Russia) Valeria Savinykh	6–3, 6–1
Win	17–7	Feb 2011	Midland Tennis Classic, US	100,000	Hard (i)	(United States) Irina Falconi	6–4, 6–4
Win	18–7	May 2011	Prague Open, Czech Republic	50,000	Clay	(Argentina) Paula Ormaechea	4–6, 6–3, 6–2
Win	19–7	Apr 2014	Chiasso Open, Switzerland	25,000	Clay	(Croatia) Tereza Mrdeža	6–3, 7–6^{(4)}
Win	20–7	Feb 2019	Trnava Indoor, Slovakia	25,000	Hard (i)	(Slovakia) Kristína Kučová	6–4, 3–6, 7–6^{(0)}

=== Doubles: 50 (35 titles, 15 runner–ups) ===
Legend
$100,000 tournaments
$80,000 tournaments
$60,000 tournaments
$25,000 tournaments
$15,000 tournaments

Result	W–L	Date	Tournament	Tier	Surface	Partner	Opponents	Score
Win	1–0	Mar 2004	ITF Buchen, Germany	10,000	Hard (i)	(Czech Republic) Eva Hrdinová	(Belgium) Elke Clijsters (Belgium) Caroline Maes	6–1, 6–4
Loss	1–1	Nov 2004	ITF Prague, Czech Republic	25,000	Hard (i)	(Czech Republic) Sandra Kleinová	(Czech Republic) Gabriela Chmelinová (Czech Republic) Michaela Paštiková	3–6, 3–6
Win	2–1	Nov 2004	ITF Opole, Poland	25,000	Carpet (i)	(Czech Republic) Eva Hrdinová	(Belarus) Ekaterina Dzehalevich (Belarus) Nadejda Ostrovskaya	7–5, 6–3
Loss	2–2	Dec 2004	ITF Valašské Meziříčí, Czech Republic	25,000	Hard (i)	(Czech Republic) Eva Hrdinová	(Austria) Daniela Klemenschits (Austria) Sandra Klemenschits	w/o
Loss	2–3	Jan 2005	ITF Oberhaching, Germany	10,000	Carpet (i)	(Czech Republic) Zuzana Zálabská	(Germany) Kristina Barrois (Germany) Korina Perkovic	3–6, 7–5, 6–7^{(6)}
Win	3–3	Feb 2005	Biberach Open, Germany	10,000	Hard (i)	(Czech Republic) Sandra Záhlavová	(Germany) Kristina Barrois (Germany) Stefanie Weis	5–7, 6–2, 7–5
Win	4–3	Mar 2005	ITF Rogaška Slatina, Slovenia	10,000	Hard (i)	(Czech Republic) Zuzana Zálabská	(Slovakia) Kristína Michalaková (Czech Republic) Andrea Hlaváčková	7–5, 6–0
Win	5–3	Apr 2005	ITF Civitavecchia, Italy	25,000	Clay	(Czech Republic) Sandra Záhlavová	(Romania) Gabriela Niculescu (Romania) Monica Niculescu	6–4, 6–3
Win	6–3	Jun 2005	Zagreb Ladies Open, Croatia	75,000	Clay	(Czech Republic) Vladimíra Uhlířová	(Austria) Daniela Klemenschits (Austria) Sandra Klemenschits	6–2, 6–2
Win	7–3	Sep 2005	Open Porte du Hainaut, France	75,000	Clay	(Czech Republic) Vladimíra Uhlířová	(Hungary) Zsófia Gubacsi (Ukraine) Mariya Koryttseva	6–0, 7–5
Win	8–3	Sep 2005	Internazionale di Biella, Italy	50,000	Clay	(Czech Republic) Renata Voráčová	(Estonia) Maret Ani (Bosnia and Herzegovina) Mervana Jugić-Salkić	6–4, 7–6^{(4)}
Win	9–3	Oct 2005	Open de Saint-Raphaël, France	50,000	Hard (i)	(Czech Republic) Sandra Záhlavová	(Argentina) María Emilia Salerni (United States) Meilen Tu	4–6, 6–4, 7–5
Win	10–3	Nov 2005	Czech Indoor Open, Czech Republic	25,000	Hard (i)	(Czech Republic) Libuše Průšová	(Czech Republic) Olga Blahotová (Czech Republic) Eva Hrdinová	6–3, 3–6, 6–3
Loss	10–4	Nov 2005	ITF Opole, Poland	25,000	Carpet (i)	(Czech Republic) Gabriela Chmelinová	(Switzerland) Timea Bacsinszky (Belarus) Nadejda Ostrovskaya	4–6, 6–7^{(5)}
Win	11–4	Dec 2005	Přerov Cup, Czech Republic	25,000	Carpet (i)	(Czech Republic) Gabriela Chmelinová	(Germany) Gréta Arn (Estonia) Margit Rüütel	3–6, 6–4, 6–4
Loss	11–5	Dec 2005	ITF Valašské Meziříčí, Czech Republic	25,000	Hard (i)	(Czech Republic) Sandra Záhlavová	(Croatia) Darija Jurak (Czech Republic) Renata Voráčová	3–6, 3–6
Win	12–5	Jan 2006	ITF Ortisei, Italy	75,000	Carpet	(Czech Republic) Vladimíra Uhlířová	(Belarus) Tatiana Poutchek (Belarus) Anastasiya Yakimova	6–4, 6–2
Win	13–5	Feb 2006	Biberach Open, Germany	25,000	Hard (i)	(Czech Republic) Olga Vymetálková	(Croatia) Darija Jurak (Czech Republic) Renata Voráčová	6–2, 4–6, 6–7^{(4)}
Win	14–5	Apr 2006	ITF Civitavecchia, Italy	25,000	Clay	(Germany) Martina Müller	(Ukraine) Tatiana Perebiynis (Czech Republic) Barbora Strýcová	6–7^{(9)}, 6–3, 7–5
Loss	14–6	Jun 2006	Zagreb Ladies Open, Croatia	50,000	Clay	(Czech Republic) Olga Vymetálková	(Czech Republic) Michaela Paštiková (Czech Republic) Hana Šromová	w/o
Loss	14–7	Aug 2006	Bronx Open, United States	50,000	Hard	(Czech Republic) Michaela Paštiková	(United States) Julie Ditty (South Africa) Natalie Grandin	1–6, 6–7^{(2)}
Loss	14–8	Oct 2006	ITF Biella, Italy	50,000	Hard	(Czech Republic) Michaela Paštiková	(Czech Republic) Barbora Strýcová (Czech Republic) Renata Voráčová	3–6, 2–6
Loss	14–9	Oct 2006	Bratislava Open, Slovakia	75,000	Hard (i)	(Czech Republic) Michaela Paštiková	(Poland) Alicja Rosolska (Poland) Klaudia Jans	1–6, 3–6
Win	15–9	Jun 2007	Přerov Cup, Czech Republic	75,000	Clay	(Czech Republic) Renata Voráčová	(Paraguay) Rossana de los Ríos (United States) Edina Gallovits	5–7, 6–3, 6–2
Win	16–9	Jun 2007	Zlín Open, Czech Republic	50,000	Hard	(Czech Republic) Renata Voráčová	(Czech Republic) Michaela Paštiková (Czech Republic) Hana Šromová	6–2, 2–6, 6–4
Win	17–9	Aug 2007	Bronx Open, United States	50,000	Hard	(Poland) Urszula Radwańska	(Ukraine) Mariya Koryttseva (Belarus) Darya Kustova	6–3, 1–6, 6–1
Win	18–9	Oct 2007	ITF Jersey, United Kingdom	25,000	Hard (i)	(Czech Republic) Andrea Hlaváčková	(United Kingdom) Katie O'Brien (United Kingdom) Georgie Gent	6–0, 6–4
Loss	18–10	Nov 2007	Ismaning Open, Germany	25,000	Hard (i)	(Czech Republic) Andrea Hlaváčková	(Germany) Julia Görges (Germany) Kristina Barrois	6–2, 2–6, [7–10]
Win	19–10	Dec 2007	ITF Valašské Meziříčí, Czech Republic	25,000	Hard (i)	(Czech Republic) Andrea Hlaváčková	(Croatia) Darija Jurak (Croatia) Ivana Lisjak	6–2, 6–1
Win	20–10	Feb 2008	ITF Belfort, France	25,000	Hard (i)	(Czech Republic) Andrea Hlaváčková	(Spain) Marta Marrero (Spain) María José Martínez Sánchez	7–6^{(8)}, 6–4
Win	21–10	Feb 2008	ITF Sutton, United Kingdom	25,000	Hard (i)	(Czech Republic) Andrea Hlaváčková	(Sweden) Johanna Larsson (United Kingdom) Anna Smith	6–3, 6–3
Loss	21–11	Jun 2008	Zlín Open, Czech Republic	75,000	Clay	(Czech Republic) Renata Voráčová	(Czech Republic) Simona Dobrá (Czech Republic) Tereza Hladíková	4–6, 3–6
Win	22–11	Oct 2008	Open de Saint-Raphaël, France	50,000	Hard (i)	(Czech Republic) Eva Birnerová	(France) Gracia Radovanovic (Czech Republic) Renata Voráčová	6–4, 6–3
Win	23–11	Oct 2008	Bratislava Open, Slovakia	100,000	Hard (i)	(Czech Republic) Andrea Hlaváčková	(Uzbekistan) Akgul Amanmuradova (Romania) Monica Niculescu	7–6^{(1)}, 6–1
Win	24–11	Mar 2009	Clearwater Open, United States	50,000	Hard	(Czech Republic) Michaela Paštiková	(Italy) Maria Elena Camerin (Belgium) Yanina Wickmayer	w/o
Win	25–11	Nov 2009	Open Nantes Atlantique, France	50,000	Hard (i)	(Czech Republic) Michaela Paštiková	(Czech Republic) Vladimíra Uhlířová (Czech Republic) Renata Voráčová	6–4, 6–4
Win	26–11	Feb 2010	Midland Tennis Classic, United States	100,000	Hard	(United States) Laura Granville	(United States) Anna Tatishvili (United States) Lilia Osterloh	7–6^{(3)}, 3–6, [12–10]
Win	27–11	Jun 2010	International Country Cuneo, Italy	100,000	Clay	(Czech Republic) Eva Birnerová	(Romania) Sorana Cîrstea (Slovenia) Andreja Klepač	3–6, 6–4, [10–8]
Win	28–11	Sep 2010	Open de Saint-Malo, France	100,000	Clay	(Czech Republic) Petra Cetkovská	(Ukraine) Mariya Koryttseva (Romania) Raluca Olaru	6–4, 6–2
Win	29–11	Oct 2010	Internationaux de Poitiers, France	100,000	Hard (i)	(Czech Republic) Renata Voráčová	(Uzbekistan) Akgul Amanmuradova (Germany) Kristina Barrois	6–7^{(5)}, 6–2 [10–5]
Win	30–11	Feb 2012	Midland Tennis Classic, United States	100,000	Hard (i)	(Czech Republic) Andrea Hlaváčková	(Russia) Vesna Dolonc (France) Stéphanie Foretz	7–6^{(4)}, 6–2
Win	31–11	Oct 2013	Internationaux de Poitiers, France	100,000	Hard (i)	(Netherlands) Michaëlla Krajicek	(United States) Christina McHale (Romania) Monica Niculescu	7–6^{(5)}, 6–2
Win	32–11	Nov 2013	Open Nantes Atlantique, France	50,000	Hard (i)	(Netherlands) Michaëlla Krajicek	(France) Stéphanie Foretz (Czech Republic) Eva Hrdinová	6–3, 6–2
Win	33–11	May 2014	Sparta Prague Open, Czech Republic	100,000	Clay	(Netherlands) Michaëlla Krajicek	(Czech Republic) Lucie Šafářová (Czech Republic) Andrea Hlaváčková	6–3, 6–2
Win	34–11	Oct 2014	Internationaux de Poitiers, France	100,000	Hard (i)	(Czech Republic) Andrea Hlaváčková	(Poland) Katarzyna Piter (Ukraine) Maryna Zanevska	6–1, 7–5
Loss	34–12	Jun 2018	ITF Klosters, Switzerland	25,000	Clay	(Japan) Yuki Naito	(Uzbekistan) Akgul Amanmuradova (Georgia (country)) Ekaterine Gorgodze	2–6, 3–6
Loss	34–13	Jul 2018	ITS Cup, Czech Republic	80,000	Clay	(Netherlands) Michaëlla Krajicek	(Czech Republic) Petra Krejsová (Czech Republic) Jesika Malečková	2–6, 1–6
Loss	34–14	Apr 2019	Charlottesville Open, United States	80,000	Clay	(Poland) Katarzyna Kawa	(United States) Asia Muhammad (United States) Taylor Townsend	6–4, 5–7 [3–10]
Loss	34–15	Jul 2019	Prague Open, Czech Republic	60,000	Clay	(Czech Republic) Johana Marková	(Romania) Nicoleta Dascălu (Cyprus) Raluca Șerban	4–6, 4–6
Win	35–15	Nov 2019	Dubai Tennis Challenge, UAE	100,000	Hard	(Slovenia) Andreja Klepac	(Spain) Sara Sorribes Tormo (Spain) Georgina García Pérez	7–5, 3–6, [10–8]
