= 2004 ITF Jounieh Open =

- Date: 21–26 September
- Edition: 1st
- Surface: Clay
- Location: Jounieh, Lebanon

Champions

Singles
- (Spain) Nuria Llagostera Vives

Doubles
- (Czech Republic) Petra Cetkovská / (Czech Republic) Hana Šromová
| ITF Jounieh Open | · 2005 → |

The 2004 ITF Jounieh Open was a tennis tournament played on Clay courts. It was the 1st edition of the ITF Jounieh Open, and was part of the $50,000 tournaments of the 2004 ITF Women's Circuit. It took place in Jounieh, Lebanon, from September 21–26, 2004. The total prize money offered at this tournament was US$50,000.

== WTA entrants ==
=== Seeds ===
| Country | Player | Rank^{1} | Seed |
|---|---|---|---|
| ESP | Nuria Llagostera Vives | 89 | 1 |
| MAR | Bahia Mouhtassine | 162 | 2 |
| UKR | Elena Tatarkova | 172 | 3 |
| ESP | Laura Pous Tió | 174 | 4 |
| HUN | Kyra Nagy | 192 | 5 |
| SVK | Stanislava Hrozenská | 196 | 6 |
| GER | Angelika Bachmann | 206 | 7 |
| SVK | Eva Fislová | 214 | 8 |

- Rankings as of September 14, 2004.

=== Other entrants ===
The following players received wildcards into the singles main draw:

- (Canada) Heidi El Tabakh
- (Luxembourg) Mandy Minella
- (Czech Republic) Petra Cetkovská
- (Venezuela) Mariana Muci

The following players received entry from the qualifying draw:

- (Germany) Franziska Etzel
- (Croatia) Maria Abramović
- (Germany) Laura Siegemund
- (Austria) Eva-Maria Hoch

== Champions ==
=== Singles ===
(Spain) Nuria Llagostera Vives def. (Spain) Lourdes Domínguez Lino, 2–6, 6–0, 6–4.

=== Doubles ===
(Czech Republic) Petra Cetkovská / (Czech Republic) Hana Šromová def. (Spain) Nuria Llagostera Vives / (Portugal) Frederica Piedade, 6–4, 6–2.
