= 2004 ITF Jounieh Open – Singles =

Singles
- 2004 ITF Jounieh Open

Final
- Champion: (Spain) Nuria Llagostera Vives
- Runner-up: (Spain) Lourdes Domínguez Lino
- Score: 2–6, 6–0, 6–4

Events
Singles	Doubles
← 2003 ·	ITF Jounieh Open	· 2005 →

This was the first edition of the tournament.

Nuria Llagostera Vives won in the final, defeating compatriot Lourdes Domínguez Lino 2–6, 6–0, 6–4 in the final.

== Seeds ==
1. (Spain) Nuria Llagostera Vives (champion)
2. (Morocco) Bahia Mouhtassine (second round)
3. (Ukraine) Elena Tatarkova (second round)
4. (Spain) Laura Pous Tió (quarterfinals)
5. (Hungary) Kyra Nagy (quarterfinals, retired)
6. (Slovakia) Stanislava Hrozenská (first round)
7. (Germany) Angelika Bachmann (first round)
8. (Slovakia) Eva Fislová (first round)

== Draw ==
=== Key ===
- Q = Qualifier
- WC = Wild card
- LL = Lucky loser
- Alt = Alternate
- SE = Special exempt
- PR = Protected ranking
- ITF = ITF entry
- JE = Junior exempt
- w/o = Walkover
- r = Retired
- d = Defaulted
- SR = Special ranking

=== Finals ===
Semifinals
1	(Spain) Nuria Llagostera Vives	6	6
(Czech Republic) Hana Šromová	2	0
(Spain) Lourdes Domínguez Lino	6	6
(India) Sania Mirza	2	4

Final
1	(Spain) Nuria Llagostera Vives	2	6	6
(Spain) Lourdes Domínguez Lino	6	0	4

=== Top half ===
First round
1	(Spain) N Llagostera Vives	6	6
(Romania) S Matei	3	4
(Russia) G Fattakhetdinova	2	6	6
(Spain) N Roig	6	4	2
(Croatia) I Abramović	6	6
(Germany) A Rösch	4	4
(Belarus) N Ostrovskaya	4	6	6
8	(Slovakia) E Fislová	6	2	0
3	(Ukraine) E Tatarkova	6	6
(Japan) M Yamamoto	3	2
WC	(Venezuela) M Muci	1	0
(United States) T Dabek	6	6
WC	(Czech Republic) P Cetkovská	7^{7}	3	4
(Czech Republic) H Šromová	6^{1}	6	6
(Slovakia) L Tvarošková	4	6	7^{7}
6	(Slovakia) S Hrozenská	6	2	6^{3}

Second round
1	(Spain) N Llagostera Vives	6	6
(Russia) G Fattakhetdinova	1	1
(Croatia) I Abramović	6	6
(Belarus) N Ostrovskaya	0	2
3	(Ukraine) E Tatarkova	3	4
(United States) T Dabek	6	6
(Czech Republic) H Šromová	7^{7}	6
(Slovakia) L Tvarošková	6^{3}	4

Quarter Finals
1	(Spain) N Llagostera Vives	4	6	6
(Croatia) I Abramović	6	3	2
(United States) T Dabek	2	1
(Czech Republic) H Šromová	6	6

Semi Final
1	(Spain) N Llagostera Vives	6	6
(Czech Republic) H Šromová	2	0

=== Bottom half ===
First round
7	(Germany) A Bachmann	2	6	5
(Spain) L Domínguez Lino	6	4	7
(Poland) J Sakowicz	7	6
Q	(Austria) E-M Hoch	5	3
(Slovakia) Z Kučová	1	6	3
WC	(Luxembourg) M Minella	6	3	6
(Singapore) B Ko	5	2
4	(Spain) L Pous Tió	7	6
5	(Hungary) K Nagy	5
Q	(Germany) L Siegemund	2^{r}
WC	(Egypt) H El Tabakh	4	1
Q	(Croatia) M Abramović	6	6
(India) S Mirza	6	6
(Portugal) F Piedade	1	2
Q	(Germany) F Etzel	6	2	1
2	(Morocco) B Mouhtassine	3	6	6

Second round
(Spain) L Domínguez Lino	6	6
(Poland) J Sakowicz	3	2
WC	(Luxembourg) M Minella	3	0
4	(Spain) L Pous Tió	6	6
5	(Hungary) K Nagy	6	6
Q	(Croatia) M Abramović	2	3
(India) S Mirza	6	6
2	(Morocco) B Mouhtassine	4	2

Quarter Finals
(Spain) L Domínguez Lino	7	6
4	(Spain) L Pous Tió	5	2
5	(Hungary) K Nagy	1	1^{r}
(India) S Mirza	6	3

Semi Final
(Spain) L Domínguez Lino	6	6
(India) S Mirza	2	4
