= 2004 Wien Energie Grand Prix =

- Date: 17–22 May
- Category: WTA Tour Tier III
- Draw: 32S / 16D
- Prize money: $170,000
- Surface: Clay /outdoor
- Location: Vienna, Austria

Champions

Singles
- (Israel) Anna Smashnova-Pistolesi

Doubles
- (United States) Martina Navratilova / (United States) Lisa Raymond
← 2003 ·	WTA Austrian Open	· 2007 →

The 2004 Wien Energie Grand Prix was a tennis tournament played on outdoor clay courts. It was part of the Tier III series of the 2004 WTA Tour. It took place in Vienna, Austria, in late May 2004.

== Finals ==
=== Singles ===
(Israel) Anna Smashnova-Pistolesi defeated (Australia) Alicia Molik 6–2, 3–6, 6–2

- It was Smashnova's 9th career title and her first in 2004

=== Doubles ===
(United States) Martina Navratilova and (United States) Lisa Raymond defeated (Zimbabwe) Cara Black and (Australia) Rennae Stubbs, 6–2, 7–5

- It was Navratilova's 174th career title and her first in 2004; it was Raymond's 43rd career title and her first in 2004.
