= 2008 Gastein Ladies =

- Date: 14–20 July
- Edition: 2nd
- Category: Tier III Series
- Draw: 32S / 16D
- Prize money: $175,000
- Surface: Clay / outdoor
- Location: Bad Gastein, Austria

Champions

Singles
- (France) Pauline Parmentier

Doubles
- (Czech Republic) Andrea Hlaváčková / (Czech Republic) Lucie Hradecká
- Gastein Ladies

The 2008 Gastein Ladies was a women's professional tennis tournament played on outdoor clay courts. It was the 2nd edition of the Gastein Ladies, and was part of the Tier III Series of the 2008 WTA Tour. It took place in Bad Gastein, Austria, from 14 July through 20 July 2008. Fourth-seeded Pauline Parmentier won the singles title.

== Finals ==
=== Singles ===
(France) Pauline Parmentier defeated (Czech Republic) Lucie Hradecká 6–4, 6–4

- It was Parmentier's only singles title of the year and the 2nd of her career.

=== Doubles ===
(Czech Republic) Andrea Hlaváčková / (Czech Republic) Lucie Hradecká defeated (Bulgaria) Sesil Karatantcheva / (Serbia) Nataša Zorić 6–3, 6–3
