= 2004 Wien Energie Grand Prix – Doubles =

Doubles
- 2004 Wien Energie Grand Prix

Final
- Champion: (United States) Martina Navratilova (United States) Lisa Raymond
- Runner-up: (Zimbabwe) Cara Black (Australia) Rennae Stubbs
- Score: 6–2, 7–5

Events
Singles	Doubles
← 2003 ·	WTA Austrian Open	· 2007 →

Li Ting and Sun Tiantian were the defending champions, but lost in the semifinals to Martina Navratilova and Lisa Raymond.

Navratilova and Raymond eventually won the title.

== Results ==
=== Seeds ===
1. (United States) Martina Navratilova / (United States) Lisa Raymond (champions)
2. (Zimbabwe) Cara Black / (Australia) Rennae Stubbs (final)
3. (China) Li Ting / (China) Sun Tiantian (semifinals)
4. (Australia) Alicia Molik / (Spain) Magüi Serna (first round)

=== Key ===
- Q = Qualifier
- WC = Wild card
- LL = Lucky loser
- Alt = Alternate
- SE = Special exempt
- PR = Protected ranking
- ITF = ITF entry
- JE = Junior exempt
- w/o = Walkover
- r = Retired
- d = Defaulted
- SR = Special ranking

=== Draw ===
First round
1	(United States) M Navratilova (United States) L Raymond	6	6
(Australia) B Stewart (Australia) S Stosur	2	4
(Bosnia and Herzegovina) M Jugić-Salkić (Germany) M Weingärtner	7	6
(Czech Republic) O Blahotová (Czech Republic) G Chmelinová	5	3
3	(China) T Li (China) T Sun	7	6
Q	(Austria) D Klemenschits (Austria) S Klemenschits	6^{5}	3
(Argentina) G Dulko (Argentina) P Tarabini	6	6
LL	(Austria) V Amesbauer (Austria) D Kix	3	3
(Australia) N Pratt (Australia) C Wheeler	6	6
(Switzerland) M Casanova (Germany) M Müller	4	2
(China) Z Yan (China) J Zheng	6	6
4	(Australia) A Molik (Spain) M Serna	2	2
WC	(Austria) B Schwartz (Germany) J Wöhr	6	6
(Russia) A Jidkova (Croatia) S Talaja	2	4
(Bulgaria) M Geznenge (Australia) N Sewell	0	1
2	(Zimbabwe) C Black (Australia) R Stubbs	6	6

Quarterfinals
1	(United States) M Navratilova (United States) L Raymond	6	3	6
(Bosnia and Herzegovina) M Jugić-Salkić (Germany) M Weingärtner	1	6	1
3	(China) T Li (China) T Sun	6	6
(Argentina) G Dulko (Argentina) P Tarabini	4	2
(Australia) N Pratt (Australia) C Wheeler	6	6
(China) Z Yan (China) J Zheng	2	4
WC	(Austria) B Schwartz (Germany) J Wöhr
2	(Zimbabwe) C Black (Australia) R Stubbs	w/o

Semifinals
1	(United States) M Navratilova (United States) L Raymond	6	3	6
3	(China) T Li (China) T Sun	1	6	2
(Australia) N Pratt (Australia) C Wheeler	3	3
2	(Zimbabwe) C Black (Australia) R Stubbs	6	6

Final
1	(United States) M Navratilova (United States) L Raymond	6	7
2	(Zimbabwe) C Black (Australia) R Stubbs	2	5
