= 2007 Gastein Ladies – Singles =

Singles
- 2007 Gastein Ladies

Final
- Champion: (Italy) Francesca Schiavone
- Runner-up: (Austria) Yvonne Meusburger
- Score: 6–1, 6–4

Details
- Draw: 32
- Seeds: 8

Events
Singles	Doubles
← 2004 ·	WTA Austrian Open	· 2008 →

The Gastein Ladies was a new addition to the WTA Tour in 2007.

Top seed Francesca Schiavone won her first career title over the unseeded Austrian Yvonne Meusburger, 6–1, 6–4.

== Seeds ==
1. (Italy) Francesca Schiavone (champion)
2. (France) Émilie Loit (first round)
3. (Italy) Roberta Vinci (first round)
4. (Estonia) Kaia Kanepi (semifinals)
5. (France) Aravane Rezaï (first round)
6. (Hungary) Ágnes Szávay (quarterfinals)
7. (Italy) Karin Knapp (semifinals)
8. (Spain) Lourdes Domínguez Lino (quarterfinals)

== Draw ==
=== Key ===
- Q = Qualifier
- WC = Wild card
- LL = Lucky loser
- Alt = Alternate
- SE = Special exempt
- PR = Protected ranking
- ITF = ITF entry
- JE = Junior exempt
- w/o = Walkover
- r = Retired
- d = Defaulted
- SR = Special ranking

=== Finals ===
Semifinals
1	(Italy) Francesca Schiavone	6	6
4	(Estonia) Kaia Kanepi	4	2
7	(Italy) Karin Knapp	1	6	3
(Austria) Yvonne Meusburger	6	3	6

Final
1	(Italy) Francesca Schiavone	6	6
(Austria) Yvonne Meusburger	1	4

=== Top half ===
First round
1	(Italy) F Schiavone	6	6
Q	(Switzerland) E Gagliardi	0	4
(Spain) V Ruano Pascual	6	6
(Croatia) N Ožegović	2	3
(Italy) F Pennetta	5	6	1
(Slovakia) D Cibulková	7	4	6
WC	(Austria) T Schiechtl	0	1
6	(Hungary) Á Szávay	6	6
4	(Estonia) K Kanepi	6	4	7
(Romania) R Olaru	2	6	5
(Czech Republic) K Zakopalová	1	7^{7}	6
Q	(Slovenia) A Klepač	6	6^{3}	1
WC	(Austria) M Klaffner	4	3
(Czech Republic) R Voráčová	6	6
(Romania) E Gallovits	3	6	6
5	(France) A Rezaï	6	3	3

Second round
1	(Italy) F Schiavone	6	2	6
(Spain) V Ruano Pascual	4	6	1
(Slovakia) D Cibulková	5	0
6	(Hungary) Á Szávay	7	6
4	(Estonia) K Kanepi	6	6
(Czech Republic) K Zakopalová	3	4
(Czech Republic) R Voráčová	6	6
(Romania) E Gallovits	2	4

Quarterfinals
1	(Italy) F Schiavone	7^{7}	2	6
6	(Hungary) Á Szávay	6^{5}	6	4
4	(Estonia) K Kanepi	6	3	6
(Czech Republic) R Voráčová	4	6	0

Semifinals
1	(Italy) F Schiavone	6	6
4	(Estonia) K Kanepi	4	2

=== Bottom half ===
First round
7	(Italy) K Knapp	6	6
WC	(Austria) E-M Hoch	2	3
Q	(Spain) L Pous Tió	7^{7}	6^{5}	6
(Russia) E Bychkova	6^{4}	7^{7}	2
(Croatia) J Kostanić Tošić	4	0
Q	(Spain) MJ Martínez Sánchez	6	6
(Germany) A-L Grönefeld	6	2	6
3	(Italy) R Vinci	4	6	0
8	(Spain) L Domínguez Lino	6	7
(Germany) T Malek	4	5
(Italy) ME Camerin	4	6^{4}
(Argentina) ME Salerni	6	7^{7}
(Czech Republic) I Benešová	6^{5}	3
(Czech Republic) E Birnerová	7^{7}	6
(Austria) Y Meusburger	6	6
2	(France) É Loit	1	3

Second round
7	(Italy) K Knapp	7^{7}	6
Q	(Spain) L Pous Tió	6^{4}	1
Q	(Spain) MJ Martínez Sánchez	6	1	7^{8}
(Germany) A-L Grönefeld	4	6	6^{6}
8	(Spain) L Domínguez Lino	0	7^{7}	6
(Argentina) ME Salerni	6	6^{4}	3
(Czech Republic) E Birnerová	4	1
(Austria) Y Meusburger	6	6

Quarterfinals
7	(Italy) K Knapp	4	7^{7}	6
Q	(Spain) MJ Martínez Sánchez	6	6^{2}	1
8	(Spain) L Domínguez Lino	1	4
(Austria) Y Meusburger	6	6

Semifinals
7	(Italy) K Knapp	1	6	3
(Austria) Y Meusburger	6	3	6

== Qualifying ==
=== Seeds ===
1. (Slovenia) Andreja Klepač (qualified)
2. (Switzerland) Emmanuelle Gagliardi (qualified)
3. (Spain) Laura Pous Tió (qualified)
4. (Czech Republic) Renata Voráčová (moved to main draw)
5. (Uzbekistan) Iroda Tulyaganova (second round)
6. (Russia) Ekaterina Ivanova (first round)
7. —
8. (Germany) Julia Görges (qualifying competition)
9. (Slovenia) Maša Zec Peškirič (second round)

=== Qualifiers ===
1. (Switzerland) Emmanuelle Gagliardi
2. (Slovenia) Andreja Klepač
3. (Spain) María José Martínez Sánchez
4. (Spain) Laura Pous Tió

=== Qualifying draw ===
==== First qualifier ====
First round
1	(Slovenia) Andreja Klepač	6	6
Alt	(Germany) Sarah-Rebecca Sekulic	2	0
(Italy) Nathalie Viérin	6	5	6
(Italy) Silvia Disderi	2	7	4
(Germany) Anne Schäfer	0	0
WC	(Austria) Marlena Metzinger	6	6
(Poland) Marta Domachowska	7	6
6	(Russia) Ekaterina Ivanova	5	3

Second round
1	(Slovenia) Andreja Klepač	6	7
(Italy) Nathalie Viérin	4	5
WC	(Austria) Marlena Metzinger	3	2
(Poland) Marta Domachowska	6	6

Qualifying competition
1	(Slovenia) Andreja Klepač	6	6
(Poland) Marta Domachowska	3	3

==== Second qualifier ====
First round
2	(Switzerland) Emmanuelle Gagliardi	7	7^{7}
(France) Violette Huck	5	6^{2}
(Czech Republic) Lucie Hradecká	6^{5}	6	6
(Slovakia) Zuzana Kučová	7^{7}	0	1
(Slovakia) Magdaléna Rybáriková	6	6
(Poland) Joanna Sakowicz	2	1
(Germany) Kathrin Wörle	6^{1}	2
5	(Uzbekistan) Iroda Tulyaganova	7^{7}	6

Second round
2	(Switzerland) Emmanuelle Gagliardi	0	6	6
(Czech Republic) Lucie Hradecká	6	2	3
(Slovakia) Magdaléna Rybáriková	6	6
5	(Uzbekistan) Iroda Tulyaganova	3	1

Qualifying competition
2	(Switzerland) Emmanuelle Gagliardi	6	6
(Slovakia) Magdaléna Rybáriková	2	1

==== Third qualifier ====
First round
3	(Spain) Laura Pous Tió	6	6
(Hungary) Zsófia Gubacsi	2	2
(Slovenia) Anja Poglajen	1	1
(Germany) Caroline Schneider	6	6
(Croatia) Ana Vrljić	5	4
(Spain) Marta Marrero	7	6
(Germany) Antonia Matic	2	5
8	(Germany) Julia Görges	6	7

Second round
3	(Spain) Laura Pous Tió	6	6
(Germany) Caroline Schneider	1	2
(Spain) Marta Marrero	4	6	6^{5}
8	(Germany) Julia Görges	6	2	7^{7}

Qualifying competition
3	(Spain) Laura Pous Tió	7^{7}	7
8	(Germany) Julia Görges	6^{3}	5

==== Fourth qualifier ====
First round
Alt	(Czech Republic) Vladimíra Uhlířová	7	4	6^{3}
WC	(Austria) Janina Toljan	5	6	7^{7}
(Germany) Carmen Klaschka	2	0
(Germany) Stephanie Gehrlein	6	6
(Spain) María José Martínez Sánchez	6	6
Alt	(Poland) Anna Mydłowska	0	0
WC	(Austria) Jeannine Prentner	1	3
9	(Slovenia) Maša Zec Peškirič	6	6

Second round
WC	(Austria) Janina Toljan	1	0
(Germany) Stephanie Gehrlein	6	6
(Spain) María José Martínez Sánchez	5	7^{7}	6
9	(Slovenia) Maša Zec Peškirič	7	6^{3}	1

Qualifying competition
(Germany) Stephanie Gehrlein	2	4
(Spain) María José Martínez Sánchez	6	6
