= Eva-Maria Hoch =

Austrian tennis player

- Country (sports): Austria
- Born: 6 August 1984 (age 40); Austria
- Retired: 2008
- Prize money: $33,394

Singles
- Career record: 94–120
- Career titles: 0
- Highest ranking: No. 491 (26 November 2007)

Doubles
- Career record: 63–65
- Career titles: 7 ITF
- Highest ranking: No. 354 (8 October 2007)

Eva-Maria Hoch (born 6 August 1984) is an Austrian former tennis player.

In her career, she won seven doubles titles on the ITF Women's Circuit. On 26 November 2007, she reached her best singles ranking of world No. 491. On 8 October 2007, she peaked at No. 354 in the WTA doubles rankings.

Hoch made her WTA Tour debut at the 2007 Gastein Ladies in both singles and doubles.

== ITF finals ==
=== Singles (0–1) ===
Legend $10,000 tournaments	Finals by surface Clay (0–1)

Result	Date	Tournament	Surface	Opponent	Score
Loss	25 June 2007	Oslo, Norway	Clay	(Latvia) Irina Kuzmina	4–6, 0–3 ret.

=== Doubles (7–4) ===
Legend $50,000 tournaments $25,000 tournaments $10,000 tournaments	Finals by surface Hard (2–1) Clay (4–1) Carpet (1–2)

Result	No.	Date	Tournament	Surface	Partner	Opponents	Score
Loss	1.	17 May 2004	Santa Cruz, Spain	Hard	(Germany) Martina Pavelec	(Brazil) Larissa Carvalho (United Kingdom) Anna Hawkins	6–2, 1–6, 6–7^{(4)}
Loss	2.	13 June 2005	Lenzerheide, Switzerland	Clay	(Germany) Diana Vrânceanu	(Czech Republic) Petra Cetkovská (Switzerland) Martina Lautenschläger	0–6, 3–6
Win	1.	11 July 2005	Garching, Germany	Clay	(Czech Republic) Zuzana Hejdová	(Slovakia) Lenka Dlhopolcová (Germany) Laura Siegemund	4–6, 6–4, 6–3
Win	2.	31 October 2005	Stockholm, Sweden	Hard (i)	(Germany) Martina Pavelec	(Sweden) Mari Andersson (Sweden) Johanna Larsson	6–4, 6–3
Loss	3.	16 January 2006	Oberhaching, Germany	Carpet (i)	(Germany) Martina Pavelec	(Croatia) Josipa Bek (Croatia) Ani Mijačika	6–2, 1–6, 4–6
Win	3.	6 November 2006	Ismaning Open, Germany	Carpet (i)	(Germany) Lydia Steinbach	(Germany) Sabrina Jolk (Germany) Annette Kolb	6–2, 6–1
Win	4.	27 November 2006	Tel Aviv, Israel	Hard	(Serbia) Ana Veselinović	(Netherlands) Marrit Boonstra (Netherlands) Renée Reinhard	6–4, 7–6^{(5)}
Loss	4.	26 February 2007	Buchen, Germany	Carpet (i)	(Italy) Lisa Sabino	(Czech Republic) Nikola Fraňková (Poland) Magdalena Kiszczyńska	0–0 ret.
Win	5.	11 June 2007	Lenzerheide, Switzerland	Clay	(Germany) Laura Siegemund	(Switzerland) Amra Sadiković (Germany) Paola Sprovieri	6–4, 6–3
Win	6.	25 June 2007	Oslo, Norway	Clay	(Austria) Melanie Klaffner	(Sweden) Mari Andersson (Norway) Karoline Steiro	6–2, 6–3
Win	7.	27 August 2007	Pörtschach, Austria	Clay	(Austria) Stefanie Haidner	(Slovenia) Taja Mohorčič (Serbia) Nataša Zorić	6–2, 6–2
