= ITF Jounieh Open =

ITF Women's Tour
- Event name: ITF Jounieh Open
- Location: Jounieh, Lebanon
- Category: ITF Women's Circuit
- Surface: Clay / outdoor
- Draw: 32S/32Q/16D
- Prize money: US$100,000

The ITF Jounieh Open (also known as the Jounieh Challenger) is a tournament for female professional tennis players played on outdoor clay courts, classified as a $100k ITF Women's Circuit event. It is held annually in Jounieh, Lebanon, since 2003. The event was cancelled in 2006 and from 2011 due to sponsorship reasons.

== Past finals ==
=== Singles ===
Year	Champion	Runner-up	Score
2010	(Czech Republic) Petra Cetkovská	(France) Mathilde Johansson	6–1, 6–3
2009	(Romania) Alexandra Dulgheru	(Slovakia) Zuzana Kučová	3–6, 6–3, 6–4
2008	(Romania) Irina-Camelia Begu	(Belarus) Anastasiya Yakimova	6–0, 6–2
2007	(Ukraine) Mariya Koryttseva	(Germany) Laura Siegemund	6–1, 6–3
2005	(Ukraine) Mariya Koryttseva	(Spain) Lourdes Domínguez Lino	7–5, 7–5
2004	(Spain) Nuria Llagostera Vives	(Spain) Lourdes Domínguez Lino	2–6, 6–0, 6–4
2003	(Hungary) Kyra Nagy	(Serbia) Ana Timotić	6–1, 7–5

=== Doubles ===
Year	Champions	Runners-up	Score
2010	(Czech Republic) Petra Cetkovská (Czech Republic) Renata Voráčová	(Czech Republic) Eva Birnerová (Slovenia) Andreja Klepač	7–5, 6–2
2009	(Ukraine) Mariya Koryttseva (Belarus) Darya Kustova	(Belarus) Ekaterina Dzehalevich (Ukraine) Yuliana Fedak	6–3, 6–4
2008	(Netherlands) Chayenne Ewijk (Belarus) Anastasiya Yakimova	(Germany) Carmen Klaschka (Germany) Laura Siegemund	7–5, 7–5
2007	(Poland) Olga Brózda (Russia) Maria Kondratieva	(Italy) Nicole Clerico (Brazil) Teliana Pereira	6–3, 6–1
2005	(Ukraine) Mariya Koryttseva (Belarus) Anastasiya Yakimova	(Ukraine) Olena Antypina (Czech Republic) Hana Šromová	7–5, 6–2
2004	(Czech Republic) Petra Cetkovská (Czech Republic) Hana Šromová	(Spain) Nuria Llagostera Vives (Portugal) Frederica Piedade	6–4, 6–2
2003	(Germany) Isabel Collischonn (Hungary) Kyra Nagy	(Germany) Antonia Matic (Germany) Stefanie Weis	6–4, 7–6^{(7–3)}
