= 2008 Gastein Ladies – Doubles =

Doubles
- 2008 Gastein Ladies

Final
- Champions: (Czech Republic) Andrea Hlaváčková (Czech Republic) Lucie Hradecká
- Runners-up: (Bulgaria) Sesil Karatantcheva (Serbia) Nataša Zorić
- Score: 6–3, 6–3

Details
- Draw: 16
- Seeds: 4

Events
| Singles | Doubles |
| ← 2007 · | Gastein Ladies | · 2009 → |

While Lucie Hradecká and Renata Voráčová were the defending champions, Voráčová chose not to participate, and only Hradecká competed that year.
Hradecká partnered with Andrea Hlaváčková, and won in the final 6–3, 6–3, against Sesil Karatantcheva and Nataša Zorić.

== Seeds ==
1. (Czech Republic) Iveta Benešová / (Slovakia) Janette Husárová (quarterfinals)
2. (Ukraine) Mariya Koryttseva / (Russia) Galina Voskoboeva (withdrew)
3. (Czech Republic) Andrea Hlaváčková / (Czech Republic) Lucie Hradecká (champions)
4. (Switzerland) Timea Bacsinszky / (France) Alizé Cornet (withdrew due to a gastrointestinal illness for Cornet)

== Draw ==
=== Key ===
- Q = Qualifier
- WC = Wild card
- LL = Lucky loser
- Alt = Alternate
- SE = Special exempt
- PR = Protected ranking
- ITF = ITF entry
- JE = Junior exempt
- w/o = Walkover
- r = Retired
- d = Defaulted
- SR = Special ranking

=== Draw ===
First round
1 | (Czech Republic) I Benešová (Slovakia) J Husárová | w/o
(France) S Cohen-Aloro (France) P Parmentier
(Slovakia) K Kachlíková (Austria) M Klaffner | 0 | 2
(United Kingdom) S Borwell (United States) C Nagle | 6 | 6
4 | (Switzerland) T Bacsinszky (France) A Cornet
(Germany) A-L Grönefeld (Germany) M Müller | w/o
(Austria) S Haidner (Bulgaria) H Esen | 0 | 0
(Bulgaria) S Karatantcheva (Serbia) N Zorić | 6 | 6
(Czech Republic) L Šafářová (Czech Republic) K Zakopalová | 6 | 6
(Germany) AP Schaefer (Russia) A Tseplukhova | 0 | 0
(Estonia) M Ani (Italy) A Besser | 1 | r
3 | (Czech Republic) A Hlaváčková (Czech Republic) L Hradecká | 2
(Israel) T Obziler (Australia) B Stewart | 5 | 2
(China) Y-f Xu (China) S Zhang | 7 | 6
WC | (Austria) S Klemenschits (Germany) M Weingärtner | w/o
2 | (Ukraine) M Koryttseva (Russia) G Voskoboeva

Quarterfinals
1 | (Czech Republic) I Benešová (Slovakia) J Husárová | 4 | 6 | [9]
(United Kingdom) S Borwell (United States) C Nagle | 6 | 3 | [11]
(Germany) A-L Grönefeld (Germany) M Müller | 4 | 6 | [6]
(Bulgaria) S Karatantcheva (Serbia) N Zorić | 6 | 4 | [10]
(Czech Republic) L Šafářová (Czech Republic) K Zakopalová | 0 | 2
3 | (Czech Republic) A Hlaváčková (Czech Republic) L Hradecká | 6 | 6
(China) Y-f Xu (China) S Zhang | 6 | 7
WC | (Austria) S Klemenschits (Germany) M Weingärtner | 2 | 5

Semifinals
(United Kingdom) S Borwell (United States) C Nagle | 4 | 6 | [5]
(Bulgaria) S Karatantcheva (Serbia) N Zorić | 6 | 4 | [10]
3 | (Czech Republic) A Hlaváčková (Czech Republic) L Hradecká | 7 | 6
(China) Y-f Xu (China) S Zhang | 6^{3} | 4

Final
(Bulgaria) S Karatantcheva (Serbia) N Zorić | 3 | 3
3 | (Czech Republic) A Hlaváčková (Czech Republic) L Hradecká | 6 | 6
