= 2004 Wien Energie Grand Prix – Singles =

Singles
- 2004 Wien Energie Grand Prix

Final
- Champion: (Israel) Anna Smashnova-Pistolesi
- Runner-up: (Australia) Alicia Molik
- Score: 6–2, 3–6, 6–2

Details
- Draw: 30
- Seeds: 8

Events
Singles	Doubles
← 2003 ·	WTA Austrian Open	· 2007 →

Paola Suárez was the defending champion, but chose not to compete in 2004.

Anna Smashnova-Pistolesi won the title.

== Seeds ==
1. (United States) Chanda Rubin (second round)
2. (Israel) Anna Smashnova-Pistolesi (winner)
3. (United States) Lisa Raymond (first round)
4. (Venezuela) María Vento-Kabchi (second round)
5. (United States) Amy Frazier (semifinals)
6. (Australia) Alicia Molik (final)
7. (Spain) Magüi Serna (quarterfinals)
8. (Croatia) Jelena Kostanić (semifinals)

== Draw ==
=== Key ===
- Q = Qualifier
- WC = Wild card
- LL = Lucky loser
- Alt = Alternate
- SE = Special exempt
- PR = Protected ranking
- ITF = ITF entry
- JE = Junior exempt
- w/o = Walkover
- r = Retired
- d = Defaulted
- SR = Special ranking

=== Finals ===
Semifinals
8	(Croatia) Jelena Kostanić	4	3
6	(Australia) Alicia Molik	6	6
5	(United States) Amy Frazier	5	2
2	(Israel) Anna Smashnova-Pistolesi	7	6

Final
6	(Australia) Alicia Molik	2	6	2
2	(Israel) Anna Smashnova-Pistolesi	6	3	6

=== Top half ===
First round
Q	(Russia) A Jidkova	6	6
WC	(Austria) B Schwartz	3	2
Q	(China) T Li	6	6
(Czech Republic) I Benešová	4	1
Q	(Australia) S Stosur	0	1
8	(Croatia) J Kostanić	6	6
4	(Venezuela) M Vento-Kabchi	4	6	6
(Hungary) M Czink	6	0	2
(Germany) M Weingärtner	7	6
(Zimbabwe) C Black	6^{4}	1
Q	(Croatia) S Talaja	6	3	1
(Slovakia) D Hantuchová	4	6	6
(Slovakia) M Suchá	5	6^{4}
6	(Australia) A Molik	7	7

Second round
1	(United States) C Rubin	6^{2}	7	4
Q	(Russia) A Jidkova	7	6^{3}	6
Q	(China) T Li	6	2	4
8	(Croatia) J Kostanić	3	6	6
4	(Venezuela) M Vento-Kabchi	1	1
(Germany) M Weingärtner	6	6
(Slovakia) D Hantuchová	6^{1}	3
6	(Australia) A Molik	7	6

Quarterfinals
Q	(Russia) A Jidkova	6^{5}	2
8	(Croatia) J Kostanić	7	6
(Germany) M Weingärtner	2	3
6	(Australia) A Molik	6	6

Semifinals
8	(Croatia) J Kostanić	4	3
6	(Australia) A Molik	6	6

=== Bottom half ===
First round
5	(United States) A Frazier	6	6
(Serbia and Montenegro) A Ivanovic	4	1
(Australia) N Pratt	7	7
(Czech Republic) D Chládková	6^{5}	5
(Slovakia) Ľ Kurhajcová	6	6
(Slovakia) Ľ Cervanová	3	1
(China) J Zheng	6	6
3	(United States) L Raymond	3	2
7	(Spain) M Serna	6	6
(Germany) A Barna	1	0
WC	(Austria) Y Meusburger	7	6
(Italy) ME Camerin	6^{4}	1
(Argentina) G Dulko	6	2	2
(Czech Republic) K Koukalová	2	6	6

Second round
5	(United States) A Frazier	6	6
(Australia) N Pratt	1	2
(Slovakia) Ľ Kurhajcová	6	6
(China) J Zheng	4	1
7	(Spain) M Serna	6	6
WC	(Austria) Y Meusburger	1	2
(Czech Republic) K Koukalová	0	1
2	(Israel) A Smashnova-Pistolesi	6	6

Quarterfinals
5	(United States) A Frazier	3	6	6
(Slovakia) Ľ Kurhajcová	6	2	2
7	(Spain) M Serna	1	0
2	(Israel) A Smashnova-Pistolesi	6	6

Semifinals
5	(United States) A Frazier	5	2
2	(Israel) A Smashnova-Pistolesi	7	6
