= 2007 Gastein Ladies – Doubles =

Doubles
- 2007 Gastein Ladies

Final
- Champions: (Czech Republic) Lucie Hradecká (Czech Republic) Renata Voráčová
- Runners-up: (Hungary) Ágnes Szávay (Czech Republic) Vladimíra Uhlířová
- Score: 6–3, 7–5

Details
- Draw: 16
- Seeds: 4

Events
Singles	Doubles
← 2004 ·	WTA Austrian Open	· 2008 →

The doubles tournament of the 2007 Gastein Ladies took place on 23–29 July on outdoor clay courts in Bad Gastein, Austria. Lucie Hradecká and Renata Voráčová won the title, defeating Ágnes Szávay and Vladimíra Uhlířová in the final.

== Seeds ==
1. (Hungary) Ágnes Szávay / (Czech Republic) Vladimíra Uhlířová (final)
2. (Spain) Lourdes Domínguez Lino / (Italy) Flavia Pennetta (first round; Penneta retired for personal reasons)
3. (Czech Republic) Lucie Hradecká / (Czech Republic) Renata Voráčová (champions)
4. (Czech Republic) Iveta Benešová / (Croatia) Jelena Kostanić Tošić (first round)

== Draw ==
=== Key ===
- Q = Qualifier
- WC = Wild card
- LL = Lucky loser
- Alt = Alternate
- SE = Special exempt
- PR = Protected ranking
- ITF = ITF entry
- JE = Junior exempt
- w/o = Walkover
- r = Retired
- d = Defaulted
- SR = Special ranking

First round
1	(Hungary) Á Szávay (Czech Republic) V Uhlířová	6	4	[10]
(Poland) M Domachowska (Poland) A Rosolska	4	6	[6]
(Germany) J Görges (Austria) E-M Hoch	2	6	[7]
(Spain) L Pous Tió (Argentina) ME Salerni	6	4	[10]
4	(Czech Republic) I Benešová (Croatia) J Kostanić Tošić	4	6	[7]
WC	(Austria) M Klaffner (Austria) Y Meusburger	6	4	[10]
(Czech Republic) E Birnerová (Czech Republic) E Hrdinová	6	6^{5}	[10]
(Chinese Taipei) C-w Chan (Ukraine) T Luzhanska	2	7	[4]
(Romania) E Gallovits (Romania) R Olaru	7	4	[10]
(Russia) E Bychkova (Slovenia) A Klepač	6^{8}	6	[8]
(Spain) M Marrero (Spain) MJ Martínez Sánchez	2	6	[8]
3	(Czech Republic) L Hradecká (Czech Republic) R Voráčová	6	1	[10]
(Switzerland) E Gagliardi (Romania) M Niculescu	2	6	[11]
WC	(Russia) E Ivanova (Uzbekistan) I Tulyaganova	6	3	[9]
(Germany) A-L Grönefeld (Germany) T Malek	w/o
2	(Spain) L Domínguez Lino (Italy) F Pennetta

Quarterfinals
1	(Hungary) Á Szávay (Czech Republic) V Uhlířová	6	6
(Spain) L Pous Tió (Argentina) ME Salerni	3	3
WC	(Austria) M Klaffner (Austria) Y Meusburger	3	5
(Czech Republic) E Birnerová (Czech Republic) E Hrdinová	6	7
(Romania) E Gallovits (Romania) R Olaru	3	6	[6]
3	(Czech Republic) L Hradecká (Czech Republic) R Voráčová	6	4	[10]
(Switzerland) E Gagliardi (Romania) M Niculescu	4	6	[10]
(Germany) A-L Grönefeld (Germany) T Malek	6	2	[5]

Semifinals
1	(Hungary) Á Szávay (Czech Republic) V Uhlířová	7	7
(Czech Republic) E Birnerová (Czech Republic) E Hrdinová	5	6^{3}
3	(Czech Republic) L Hradecká (Czech Republic) R Voráčová	6	6
(Switzerland) E Gagliardi (Romania) M Niculescu	2	3

Final
1	(Hungary) Á Szávay (Czech Republic) V Uhlířová	3	5
3	(Czech Republic) L Hradecká (Czech Republic) R Voráčová	6	7
