= 2008 Gastein Ladies – Singles =

Singles
- 2008 Gastein Ladies

Final
- Champion: (France) Pauline Parmentier
- Runner-up: (Czech Republic) Lucie Hradecká
- Score: 6–4, 6–4

Details
- Draw: 32
- Seeds: 8

Events
Singles	Doubles
← 2007 ·	Gastein Ladies	· 2009 →

Francesca Schiavone was the defending champion, but chose not to participate that year.

Pauline Parmentier won in the final 6–4, 6–4, against Lucie Hradecká.

== Seeds ==
1. (Hungary) Ágnes Szávay (semifinals)
2. (France) Alizé Cornet (first round, retired due to a gastrointestinal illness)
3. (Denmark) Caroline Wozniacki (second round)
4. (France) Pauline Parmentier (champion)
5. (Switzerland) Timea Bacsinszky (second round)
6. (Italy) Sara Errani (withdrew due to a shoulder injury)
7. (Czech Republic) Iveta Benešová (quarterfinals)
8. (Russia) Vera Dushevina (first round)
9. (Czech Republic) Klára Zakopalová (first round)

== Draw ==
=== Key ===
- Q = Qualifier
- WC = Wild card
- LL = Lucky loser
- Alt = Alternate
- SE = Special exempt
- PR = Protected ranking
- ITF = ITF entry
- JE = Junior exempt
- w/o = Walkover
- r = Retired
- d = Defaulted
- SR = Special ranking

=== Finals ===
Semifinals
1	(Hungary) Ágnes Szávay	4	2
4	(France) Pauline Parmentier	6	6
(Ukraine) Mariya Koryttseva	3	2
Q	(Czech Republic) Lucie Hradecká	6	6

Final
4	(France) Pauline Parmentier	6	6
Q	(Czech Republic) Lucie Hradecká	4	4

=== Top half ===
First round
1	(Hungary) Á Szávay	6	6
LL	(Ukraine) V Kutuzova	4	2
WC	(Austria) M Klaffner	6	6
(Czech Republic) L Šafářová	3	4
PR	(Croatia) S Mamić	6	4	0
(Russia) G Voskoboeva	4	6	6
(Belgium) K Flipkens	7	5	4
7	(Czech Republic) I Benešová	6^{5}	7	6
4	(France) P Parmentier	6	7
(Italy) T Garbin	2	6^{3}
WC	(Germany) A-L Grönefeld	6	6
(Ukraine) J Vakulenko	1	1
(France) S Cohen-Aloro	5	2
(Austria) Y Meusburger	7	6
(Estonia) M Ani	7	4	6
9	(Czech Republic) K Zakopalová	5	6	3

Second round
1	(Hungary) Á Szávay	3	7	7
WC	(Austria) M Klaffner	6	6^{8}	6^{3}
(Russia) G Voskoboeva	4	6	1
7	(Czech Republic) I Benešová	6	4	6
4	(France) P Parmentier	7	4	6
WC	(Germany) A-L Grönefeld	5	6	4
(Austria) Y Meusburger	6	2	6
(Estonia) M Ani	2	6	3

Quarterfinals
1	(Hungary) Á Szávay	6	6
7	(Czech Republic) I Benešová	2	2
4	(France) P Parmentier	7	6
(Austria) Y Meusburger	6^{3}	3

Semifinals
1	(Hungary) Á Szávay	4	2
4	(France) P Parmentier	6	6

=== Bottom half ===
First round
8	(Russia) V Dushevina	3	4
(Croatia) K Šprem	6	6
(Spain) N Llagostera Vives	6	6^{6}	5
Q	(Czech Republic) T Hladíková	3	7	7
(Ukraine) M Koryttseva	6	6
(Israel) T Obziler	2	1
(Chinese Taipei) S-w Hsieh	1	1
3	(Denmark) C Wozniacki	6	6
5	(Switzerland) T Bacsinszky	6	3	6
Q	(Romania) L Ungur	3	6	3
Q	(Czech Republic) L Hradecká	6	6
Q	(China) S Zhang	3	0
(Germany) M Müller	3	3
WC	(Austria) P Mayr	6	6
(Paraguay) R de los Ríos	2	6	3
2	(France) A Cornet	6	2	2^{r}

Second round
(Croatia) K Šprem	3	6	4
Q	(Czech Republic) T Hladíková	6	1	6
(Ukraine) M Koryttseva	6	4	7
3	(Denmark) C Wozniacki	4	6	6^{5}
5	(Switzerland) T Bacsinszky	1	4
Q	(Czech Republic) L Hradecká	6	6
WC	(Austria) P Mayr	6	6
(Paraguay) R de los Ríos	3	3

Quarterfinals
Q	(Czech Republic) T Hladíková	3	1
(Ukraine) M Koryttseva	6	6
Q	(Czech Republic) L Hradecká	6	6
WC	(Austria) P Mayr	3	1

Semifinals
(Ukraine) M Koryttseva	3	2
Q	(Czech Republic) L Hradecká	6	6
