= 2010 Dow Corning Tennis Classic – Doubles =

Doubles
- 2010 Dow Corning Tennis Classic

Final
- Champions: (Czech Republic) Lucie Hradecká (United States) Laura Granville
- Runners-up: (Georgia (country)) Anna Tatishvili (United States) Lilia Osterloh
- Score: 7–6(3), 3–6, [12–10]

Events
Singles	Doubles
← 2009 ·	Dow Corning Tennis Classic	· 2011 →

The 2010 Dow Corning Tennis Classic doubles was held in Midland, Michigan.

In the finals, top seeds Lucie Hradecká and Laura Granville defeated fourth seeds Anna Tatishvili and Lilia Osterloh to win the first edition of the Dow Corning Tennis Classic as a 100K tournament.

== Seeds ==
1. (Czech Republic) Lucie Hradecká / (United States) Laura Granville (champions)
2. (Greece) Eleni Daniilidou / (Germany) Jasmin Wöhr (Semi finals)
3. (Romania) Monica Niculescu / USA Meghann Shaughnessy (Semi finals)
4. GEO Anna Tatishvili / USA Lilia Osterloh (finals)

== Draw ==
Key

- Q = Qualifier
- WC = Wild card
- LL = Lucky loser
- Alt = Alternate
- ITF = ITF entry
- PR = Protected ranking
- SR = Special ranking
- SE = Special exempt
- JE = Junior exempt
- JR = Junior Accelerator Programme entrant
- CO = College Accelerator Programme entrant
- NG = Next Gen Accelerator Program entrant
- w/o = Walkover
- r = Retired
- d = Defaulted

=== Finals ===
First round
1	(Czech Republic) L Hradecká (United States) L Granville	4	6	[10]
(United States) C Fusano (United States) C Nagle	6	4	[3]
(Slovenia) P Rampre (Canada) M Drake	6	6
WC	(Dominican Republic) D Patton (United States) K Close	0	1
3	(Romania) M Niculescu (United States) M Shaughnessy	4	6	[10]
(France) Y Fedossova (Russia) K Lykina	6	3	[3]
(Netherlands) A Rus (United Kingdom) K Obrien	2	3
(Australia) M Adamczak (United States) M Moulton-Levy	6	6
WC	(United States) S Sundaram (United States) C Hsu	0	4
(Serbia) T Mirčić (Germany) K Wörle	6	6
(United Kingdom) A Keothavong (United Kingdom) H Watson	3	3
4	(Georgia (country)) A Tatishvili (United States) L Osterloh	6	6
(Belgium) T Hendler (Czech Republic) N Vaidišová	6	6
(United States) C Dolehide (United States) A Haynes	1	4
2	(Greece) E Daniilidou (Germany) J Wöhr	6	2	[10]
(United States) M Brengle (United States) J Hampton	3	6	[6]

Quarterfinals
1	(Czech Republic) L Hradecká (United States) L Granville	6	6
(Slovenia) P Rampre (Canada) M Drake	1	2
3	(Romania) M Niculescu (United States) M Shaughnessy	7^{7}	7
(Australia) M Adamczak (United States) M Moulton-Levy	6^{4}	5
4	(Georgia (country)) A Tatishvili (United States) L Osterloh	6	6
(Serbia) T Mirčić (Germany) K Wörle	2	3
2	(Greece) E Daniilidou (Germany) J Wöhr	6	6
(Belgium) T Hendler (Czech Republic) N Vaidišová	2	3

Semifinals
1	(Czech Republic) L Hradecká (United States) L Granville	6	2	[12]
3	(Romania) M Niculescu (United States) M Shaughnessy	3	6	[10]
2	(Greece) E Daniilidou (Germany) J Wöhr	3	6^{3}
4	(Georgia (country)) A Tatishvili (United States) L Osterloh	6	7^{7}

Finals
1	(Czech Republic) L Hradecká (United States) L Granville	7^{7}	3	[12]
4	(Georgia (country)) A Tatishvili (United States) L Osterloh	6^{4}	6	[10]

== See also ==
- 2010 Dow Corning Tennis Classic - Singles
