= Pauline Parmentier =

French tennis player (born 1986)

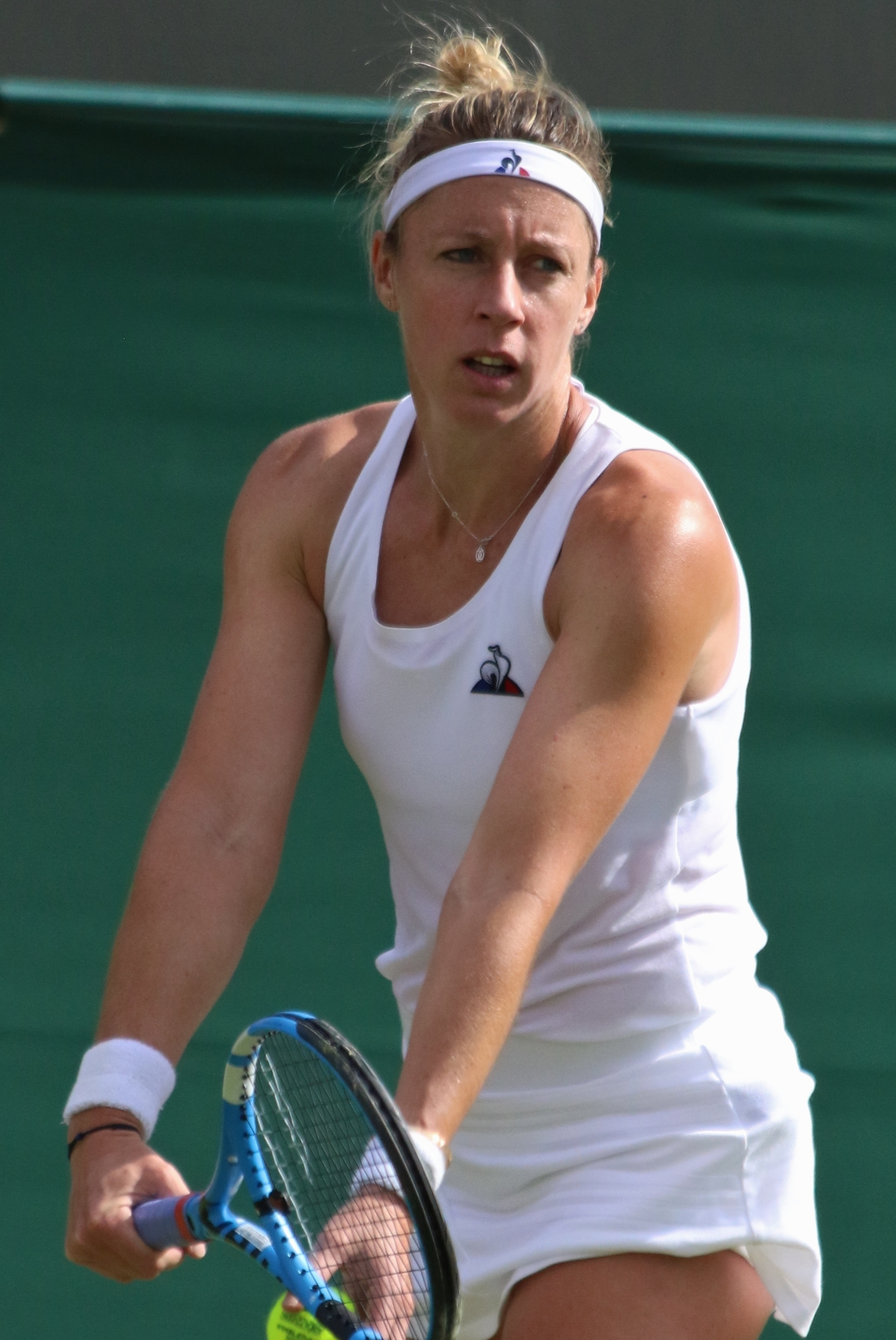
- Parmentier at the 2019 Wimbledon
- Country (sports): France
- Residence: Paris
- Born: 31 January 1986 (age 40) Cucq, France
- Height: 1.75 m (5 ft 9 in)
- Turned pro: 2000
- Retired: 2020
- Plays: Right-handed (two-handed backhand)
- Coach: Nicolas Sabas; Alexia Dechaume-Balleret (2013-2016); Olivier Patience (2016-2020); Loïc Courteau (2017-2020)
- Prize money: US$ 3,788,336

Singles
- Career record: 474–444
- Career titles: 4 WTA, 10 ITF
- Highest ranking: No. 40 (21 July 2008)

Grand Slam singles results
- Australian Open: 2R (2008, 2012, 2017)
- French Open: 4R (2014)
- Wimbledon: 2R (2008, 2009, 2011, 2019)
- US Open: 3R (2012)

Other tournaments
- Olympic Games: 1R (2008)

Doubles
- Career record: 79–141
- Career titles: 0 WTA, 3 ITF
- Highest ranking: No. 89 (30 April 2012)

Grand Slam doubles results
- Australian Open: 2R (2013, 2017)
- French Open: 3R (2014)
- Wimbledon: 2R (2008, 2013)
- US Open: 2R (2014)

Other doubles tournaments
- Olympic Games: 1R (2008)

Grand Slam mixed doubles results
- Australian Open: 1R (2017)
- French Open: 2R (2009, 2017)

Team competitions
- Fed Cup: W (2019)

Pauline Parmentier (French pronunciation: [pɔlin paʁmɑ̃tje, po-]; born 31 January 1986) is a French former tennis player.

Her career-high WTA singles ranking is 40, which she attained on 21 July 2008. On 30 April 2012, she peaked at No. 89 on the WTA doubles rankings. She won four singles titles on the WTA Tour, as well as ten singles and three doubles titles on the ITF Women's Circuit. She competed in the singles and women's doubles events at the 2008 Summer Olympics, and had been playing for France in the Fed Cup since 2010, with a win–loss record of 7–14. Parmentier retired following the 2020 French Open.

== Personal life ==
Parmentier was born in the northern French town of Cucq to Dominique and Jean-Philippe. She has two older brothers named Olivier and Julien. Pauline began playing tennis at age six and trained for five years at the Mouratoglou Tennis Academy.

== Career ==
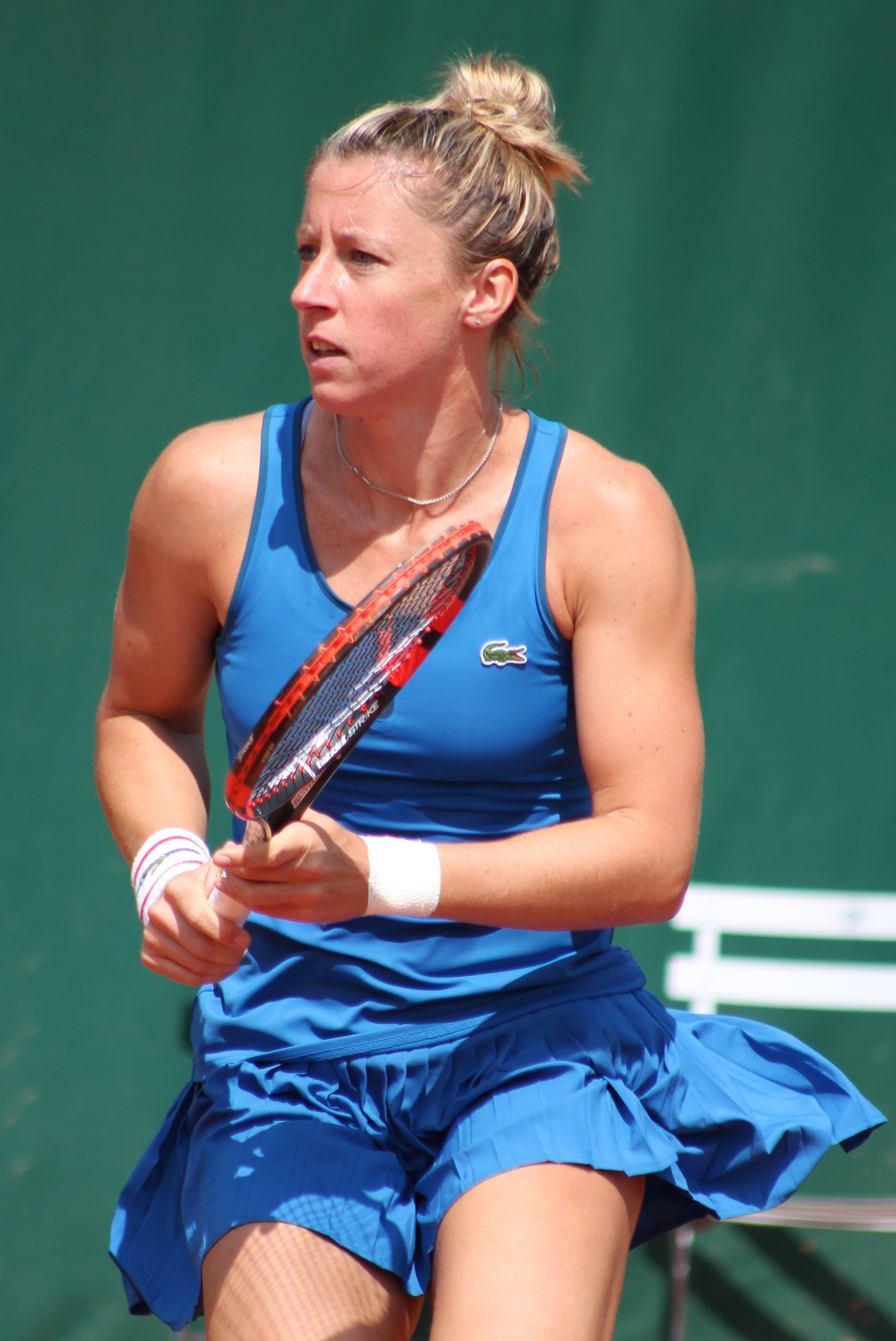
Parmentier, 2015

=== 2000–2003 ===
In 2000, Parmentier played only one tournament on the ITF Women's Circuit; she lost her main-draw opening match in both the singles and doubles events of a $10k tournament held in November in the French commune of Villenave-d'Ornon.

In 2001, she played just three ITF tournaments (in Villenave-d'Ornon, Le Havre and Deauville – all held in November, $10k each) and only took part in their singles events; she was eliminated in the qualifying rounds of all three.

She did not play a single ITF event in 2002. She did not have any year-end WTA singles or doubles ranking for 2000, 2001 and 2002.

Parmentier played 13 tournaments in the 2003 ITF Women's Circuit, appearing in their singles or doubles events or both.

=== 2004–2005 ===
In May 2004, she made her WTA Tour singles debut at the Internationaux de Strasbourg, losing in the second qualifying round to Henrieta Nagyová. At her major debut at the 2004 French Open (she received wildcards for both events), she lost in the second singles qualifying round to Roberta Vinci and in the first round of the women's doubles.

It was in 2005 at the French Open that Parmentier appeared in the singles main draw of a WTA tournament for the first time in her career; she entered as a wildcard and lost in the first round to Iveta Benešová. At the US Open, she won three qualifying matches to reach the main draw, where she lost to second seed Lindsay Davenport in the second round.

=== 2007: First WTA Tour singles title ===
Parmentier again qualified for the main draw of the US Open where she defeated Tatjana Malek in the first round and fell to Martina Hingis in the second. She broke into the top 100 (at world No. 87) of the WTA rankings for the first time in her career on 10 September 2007 (her singles ranking was No. 106 on 27 August, at the start of the 2007 US Open). Parmentier won her first career WTA Tour singles title at the Tashkent Open as an unseeded player in October 2007; she did not drop a set during the tournament, defeating the three top seeds Dominika Cibulková (first round), Olga Govortsova (semifinals) and Victoria Azarenka (final) en route to winning the title. She also won three ITF singles titles in 2007.

=== 2008: Second singles title ===
On 18 February 2008, two days after losing in the semifinals of the Tier-III Cachantún Cup in Viña del Mar to top seed Flavia Pennetta, Parmentier made her debut in the top 50 of the singles rankings; she rose from world No. 53 at the start of the 2008 Cachantún Cup to No. 47. She won the title at Bad Gastein in July – it was her second career (and first Tier III) singles title. Seeded No. 4, she defeated top seed Ágnes Szávay in the semifinals before defeating qualifier Lucie Hradecká in the final. Parmentier was nominated to play at the Summer Olympics after Mary Pierce and Amélie Mauresmo withdrew. She lost her singles first-round match to the No. 16 seed Dominika Cibulková and her doubles first-round match (she was paired with Tatiana Golovin) to the Indian pair of Sania Mirza and Sunitha Rao by walkover.

=== 2010 ===
Parmentier made her Fed Cup debut at the World Group quarterfinal tie against the team of the United States in February 2010. She lost her first match against Melanie Oudin but won her second against Christina McHale by the same scoreline. France lost the tie 1–4.

Parmentier qualified for the singles main draw of the Miami Open by defeating American teenager Lauren Davis and Tamarine Tanasugarn in the qualifying rounds; in the main draw, she beat Sybille Bammer before losing to No. 25 seed Ana Ivanovic in the second round.

=== 2012 ===
In late May, the unseeded Parmentier upset the top seed Sabine Lisicki (who was then ranked world No. 12 in the singles ranking) in the first round of the Internationaux de Strasbourg. She then defeated Stéphanie Foretz in the second round and Alexandra Panova in the quarterfinals to reach her first WTA Tour singles semifinal since winning the title in Bad Gastein; she lost her semifinal to her compatriot and unseeded wildcard Alizé Cornet in three sets.

At the US Open, as an unseeded player, Parmentier defeated No. 25 seed Yanina Wickmayer in the second round, before losing to fifth seed Petra Kvitová in the third; it was the first time that she had advanced to the third round of the main draw in a Grand Slam tournament.

=== 2013 ===
In 2013, Parmentier won only one match (Auckland, held in the first week of January) and exited the first round nine times in ten singles main-draw events, including the Australian Open, French Open and Wimbledon. She missed several events in April and May because of a right shoulder injury. In the second half of the year, she played the singles events of eleven tournaments (ten of those on ITF level), including the US Open qualifying event.

=== 2014: French Open 4th round ===
In the first week of January, the unseeded Parmentier lost in the semifinals of the $25k tournament in Hong Kong to Elizaveta Kulichkova in three sets after having defeated top seed Magda Linette in the first round and eighth-seeded Mayo Hibi in the quarterfinals.

At the French Open, Parmentier achieved her career-best singles showing in a Grand Slam tournament. She had received a main-draw wildcard and was ranked world No. 145 in the WTA rankings coming into that tournament. There she defeated three players then ranked in the top 100 (the No. 17 seed Roberta Vinci, the unseeded Yaroslava Shvedova and the unseeded Mona Barthel) before losing to the unseeded Garbiñe Muguruza in the fourth round.

=== 2016 ===
In the first five months of 2016, Parmentier reached at least the last eight of the singles main draw in four WTA Tour tournaments as a lucky loser, unseeded player or wildcard; she lost to No. 8 seed, Dominika Cibulková, in the semifinals in Katowice (that was her first singles semifinal appearance on the WTA Tour since the 2012 Internationaux de Strasbourg) and was defeated in the singles quarterfinals in Monterrey, Rabat and Strasbourg.

She was the No. 88 in the singles rankings coming into the French Open, defeating No. 31 seed Monica Niculescu in the first round and Irina Falconi in the second before losing to No. 8 seed, Timea Bacsinszky, in the third.

In July, the unseeded Parmentier reached her fifth and final WTA Tour singles quarterfinal of the year at the Bucharest Open, in which she lost to Vania King.

=== 2017 ===
In February, Parmentier played only one match (which was the fourth and final singles rubber) in the Fed Cup World Group quarterfinal against Switzerland. She lost it to Belinda Bencic, what enabled Switzerland to take an unassailable 3–1 lead and sent France to the World Group play-offs. Three weeks after her Fed Cup defeat, the unseeded Parmentier lost in the quarterfinals of the WTA Tour tournament in Acapulco to top seed Mirjana Lučić-Baroni.

Coming into the Premier Mandatory Indian Wells Open, Parmentier had never in her singles career beaten a player ranked in the WTA top ten. In that tournament, Parmentier came close to doing so, holding a set point in the first set and leading 4–1 in the third set of her third-round match against world No. 2, Angelique Kerber, before losing in three sets. She also lost in the third round of the Miami Open (the next Premier Mandatory tournament) to world No. 11, Johanna Konta, after causing an upset by beating No. 24 seed Tímea Babos in the second round.

After her good performances at Indian Wells and Miami, Parmentier lost in the first round of her next four tournaments – Biel, Rabat, Madrid and Strasbourg. At Strasbourg, she failed to convert two match points while leading 6–5 in the final set against qualifier Madison Brengle. She ended her run of four consecutive singles main-draw first-round defeats at the French Open when she defeated Irina Khromacheva, before losing to Carina Witthöft in the second round.

In July, she reached her second Tour singles quarterfinal of the year at the tournament in Bucharest, where she eliminated No. 5 seed, Elise Mertens, in the second round before losing her quarterfinal match against No. 7 seed, Irina-Camelia Begu. In her third-last event of the year in Luxembourg, Parmentier won three qualifying and three main-draw matches to reach her first and only singles semifinal of the 2017 WTA Tour, where she lost to Carina Witthöft in three sets (it was Witthöft's third straight win over Parmentier). In November, Parmentier narrowly failed to qualify for her first WTA 125 singles final when she was beaten in three sets in the semifinals by Monica Niculescu at the Open de Limoges. However, she reached her first career WTA 125 doubles final at Limoges; she and her partner Chloé Paquet lost in the final to Valeria Savinykh and Maryna Zanevska.

=== 2018: Two more career singles titles ten years after her last one ===
In the first 15 weeks of the year, Parmentier compiled a singles match record of two wins and 13 defeats. During that period, she won her first-round match but lost her second-round match in the singles main draw events at the Taiwan Open and in Croissy-Beaubourg. She registered eleven other singles defeats during that period by losing both her matches in the Fed Cup World Group quarterfinal tie against Belgium on 10–11 February, and her opening matches at seven WTA Tour tournaments (Shenzhen, Hobart, Australian Open, Budapest, Acapulco, Indian Wells and Miami) and two ITF tournaments (Andrézieux-Bouthéon and Tunis). In April, Parmentier played in the World Group semifinal tie against the United States in Aix-en-Provence. She pushed two players ranked in the top 20 to tight losses, losing to Sloane Stephens and Madison Keys; the Americans won the tie 3–2.

At the Istanbul Cup, held in the last week of April, Parmentier registered her first career singles win over a top-ten player in her 16th attempt by defeating the top seed and world No. 2, Caroline Wozniacki, who retired in the quarterfinals, after leading 4–6, 6–3 due to a left abdominal injury. She then defeated the No. 7 seed, Irina-Camelia Begu, in the semifinals to reach her first WTA Tour singles final since winning the 2008 Gastein Ladies title. In the final, she defeated the unseeded Polona Hercog to win her third career singles title. On 30 April, the day after winning the Istanbul Cup singles title, Parmentier rose from No. 122 (seven days earlier) to world No. 76 in the singles rankings.

She lost in the first and second round in her next two tournaments, in Cagnes-sur-Mer and Strasbourg, respectively. She entered the main draw of the French Open as a wildcard, and defeated Chloé Paquet (another French wildcard) and Alizé Cornet (seeded No. 32) in the first and second rounds, respectively, both in three sets. She lost to second seeded Caroline Wozniacki in the third round. Parmentier played only one pre-Wimbledon grass-court tournament in June, in Southsea, where she was defeated by Kirsten Flipkens in the semifinals. Parmentier lost her opening matches in her next two tournaments (Wimbledon Championships and Contrexéville Open) to Taylor Townsend and Zheng Saisai, respectively. Parmentier entered the Bucharest Open as the No. 7 seed and defeated Alexandra Dulgheru in three sets. In her second-round match against Wang Yafan, Parmentier was trailing 6–7, 0–3 when she was forced to retire because of a neck injury. The following week in Moscow, she was beaten in the first round by third-seeded Anastasija Sevastova. Parmentier entered the main draw of the New Haven Open as a lucky loser, losing in the first round to Anett Kontaveit. She lost her opening matches in her next two tournaments (US Open and Chicago Challenger) to Madison Keys and Dayana Yastremska, respectively.

Parmentier won the title at the Tournoi de Québec in September, defeating qualifier Jessica Pegula in the final.

== Performance timelines ==
Key
W	F	SF	QF	#R	RR	Q#	P#	DNQ	A	Z#	PO	G	S	B	NMS	NTI	P	NH

(W) winner; (F) finalist; (SF) semifinalist; (QF) quarterfinalist; (#R) rounds 4, 3, 2, 1; (RR) round-robin stage; (Q#) qualification round; (P#) preliminary round; (DNQ) did not qualify; (A) absent; (Z#) Davis/Fed Cup Zonal Group (with number indication) or (PO) play-off; (G) gold, (S) silver or (B) bronze Olympic/Paralympic medal; (NMS) not a Masters tournament; (NTI) not a Tier I tournament; (P) postponed; (NH) not held; (SR) strike rate (events won / competed); (W–L) win–loss record.
To avoid confusion and double counting, these charts are updated at the conclusion of a tournament or when the player's participation has ended.

Only main-draw results in WTA Tour, Grand Slam tournaments, Fed Cup and Olympic Games are included in win–loss records.

=== Singles ===
Tournament	2003	2004	2005	2006	2007	2008	2009	2010	2011	2012	2013	2014	2015	2016	2017	2018	2019	SR	W–L	Win%
Grand Slam tournaments
Australian Open	A	A	A	Q2	A	2R	A	1R	1R	2R	1R	1R	1R	Q1	2R	1R	1R	0 / 10	3–10	23%
French Open	A	Q2	1R	1R	2R	1R	1R	1R	2R	1R	1R	4R	1R	3R	2R	3R	1R	0 / 15	10–15	40%
Wimbledon	A	A	A	Q1	A	2R	2R	1R	2R	1R	1R	Q1	1R	1R	1R	1R	2R	0 / 11	4–11	27%
US Open	A	A	2R	Q2	2R	2R	Q3	2R	2R	3R	Q2	1R	Q1	1R	1R	1R	1R	0 / 11	7–11	39%
Win–loss	0–0	0–0	1–2	0–1	2–2	3–4	1–2	1–4	3–4	3–4	0–3	3–3	0–3	2–3	2–4	2–4	1–4	0 / 47	24–47	34%
Career statistics
Tournaments	0	0	2	2	5	22	12	15	13	16	10	10	9	15	20	17		Career total: 168		
Titles	0	0	0	0	1	1	0	0	0	0	0	0	0	0	0	2		Career total: 4		
Finals	0	0	0	0	1	1	0	0	0	0	0	0	0	0	0	2		Career total: 4		
Overall win–loss	0–0	0–0	1–2	0–2	9–4	17–21	6–12	6–16	5–14	13–16	1–10	7–10	2–9	13–15	16–20	15–18		4 / 168	111–169	40%
Win (%)	–	–	33%	0%	69%	45%	33%	27%	26%	45%	9%	41%	18%	46%	44%	45%		Career total: 40%		
Year-end ranking	493	261	207	197	59	62	109	102	74	66	225	79	116	73	91	54	122	$3,709,571		

=== Doubles ===
Tournament	2003	2004	2005	2006	2007	2008	2009	2010	2011	2012	2013	2014	2015	2016	2017	2018	2019	SR	W–L	Win%
Grand Slam tournaments
Australian Open	A	A	A	A	A	1R	A	A	A	1R	2R	A	1R	A	2R	1R	1R	0 / 7	2–7	22%
French Open	A	1R	1R	1R	1R	2R	2R	1R	2R	1R	2R	3R	1R	2R	2R	1R	1R	0 / 16	8–16	33%
Wimbledon	A	A	A	A	A	2R	1R	A	1R	1R	2R	1R	A	A	A	A	1R	0 / 7	2–7	22%
US Open	A	A	A	A	A	1R	A	A	1R	1R	A	2R	A	1R	A	1R	A	0 / 6	1–6	14%
Win–loss	0–0	0–1	0–1	0–1	0–1	2–4	1–2	0–1	1–3	0–4	3–3	3–3	0–2	1–2	2–2	0–3	0–3	0 / 36	13–36	27%
Career statistics
Year-end ranking	733	356	369	657	424	172	192	587	124	210	112	129	295	364	262	384	829	$3,709,571		

== WTA Tour finals ==
=== Singles: 4 (4 titles) ===
Legend Premier M & Premier 5 Premier International (4–0)	Finals by surface Hard (1–0) Clay (2–0) Carpet (1–0)

Result	W–L	Date	Tournament	Tier	Surface	Opponent	Score
Win	1–0	Oct 2007	Tashkent Open, Uzbekistan	Tier IV (Note: The WTA Tier II tournaments were reclassified as WTA Premier tournaments in 2009, while the WTA Tier III tournaments, WTA Tier IV tournaments and WTA Tier V tournaments were reclassified as WTA International tournaments the same year .)	Hard	(Belarus) Victoria Azarenka	7–5, 6–2
Win	2–0	Jul 2008	Gastein Ladies, Austria	Tier III	Clay	(Czech Republic) Lucie Hradecká	6–4, 6–4
Win	3–0	Apr 2018	İstanbul Cup, Turkey	International	Clay	(Slovenia) Polona Hercog	6–4, 3–6, 6–3
Win	4–0	Sep 2018	Tournoi de Québec, Canada	International	Carpet (i)	(United States) Jessica Pegula	7–5, 6–2

=== Doubles: 1 (runner-up) ===
Legend International (0–1)	Finals by surface Hard (0–1)

Result	Date	Tournament	Tier	Surface	Partner	Opponents	Score
Loss	Aug 2011	Texas Open, United States	International	Hard	(France) Alizé Cornet	(Italy) Alberta Brianti (Romania) Sorana Cîrstea	5–7, 3–6

== WTA 125 finals ==
=== Doubles: 1 (runner-up) ===
Result	Date	Tournament	Surface	Partner	Opponents	Score
Loss	Nov 2017	Open de Limoges, France	Hard (i)	(France) Chloé Paquet	(Russia) Valeria Savinykh (Belgium) Maryna Zanevska	0–6, 2–6

== ITF Circuit finals ==
=== Singles: 25 (10 titles, 15 runner-ups) ===
Legend $100,000 tournaments $75,000 tournaments $50,000 tournaments $25,000 tournaments $10,000 tournaments	Finals by surface Hard (3–6) Clay (7–9)

Result	W–L	Date	Tournament	Tier	Surface	Opponent	Score
Win	1–0	Dec 2004	ITF Cairo, Egypt	10,000	Clay	(Ukraine) Yuliya Ustyuzhanina	6–1, 6–1
Loss	1–1	Dec 2004	ITF Cairo, Egypt	10,000	Clay	(Russia) Galina Fokina	4–6, 3–6
Loss	1–2	Jul 2006	ITF Périgueux, France	25,000	Clay	(Israel) Yevgenia Savransky	6–1, 6–7^{(3)}, 2–6
Win	2–2	Jan 2007	ITF Fort Walton Beach, United States	25,000	Hard	(Slovakia) Jana Juricová	6–4, 6–3
Win	3–2	Apr 2007	Open de Biarritz, France	25,000	Clay	(Tunisia) Selima Sfar	6–2, 6–4
Win	4–2	Jul 2007	Pétange Open, Luxembourg	75,000	Clay	(Germany) Martina Müller	6–1, 6–4
Loss	4–3	Oct 2009	GB Pro-Series Barnstaple, UK	50,000	Hard (i)	(Sweden) Johanna Larsson	2–6, 2–6
Win	5–3	Oct 2009	Open Saint Raphaël, France	50,000	Hard (i)	(Czech Republic) Sandra Záhlavová	7–6^{(4)}, 6–2
Loss	5–4	Jul 2010	ITF Cuneo, Italy	100,000	Clay	(Italy) Romina Oprandi	0–6, 2–6
Loss	5–5	Oct 2010	Internationaux de Poitiers, France	100,000	Hard (i)	(Sweden) Sofia Arvidsson	2–6, 6–7^{(4)}
Loss	5–6	May 2011	Open de Cagnes-sur-Mer, France	100,000	Clay	(Romania) Sorana Cîrstea	7–6^{(5)}, 2–6, 2–6
Win	6–6	Jun 2011	Open de Marseille, France	100,000	Clay	(Romania) Irina-Camelia Begu	6–3, 6–2
Win	7–6	Jul 2011	Open de Biarritz, France	100,000	Clay	(Austria) Patricia Mayr-Achleitner	1–6, 6–4, 6–4
Loss	7–7	Jun 2012	Open de Marseille, France	100,000	Clay	(Spain) Lourdes Domínguez Lino	3–6, 3–6
Loss	7–8	Sep 2013	ITF Mont-de-Marsan, France	25,000	Clay	(Brazil) Teliana Pereira	1–6, 4–6
Loss	7–9	Sep 2013	Open de Saint-Malo, France	25,000	Clay	(Brazil) Teliana Pereira	2–6, 1–6
Win	8–9	Feb 2014	Open de l'Isère, France	25,000	Hard (i)	(Ukraine) Anastasiya Vasylyeva	2–6, 6–0, 6–4
Loss	8–10	Feb 2014	ITF Nottingham, UK	25,000	Hard (i)	(Russia) Ekaterina Bychkova	0–3 ret.
Loss	8–11	Apr 2014	ITF Edgbaston, UK	25,000	Hard (i)	(Turkey) Çağla Büyükakçay	4–6, 6–2, 2–6
Loss	8–12	May 2014	Open Saint-Gaudens, France	50,000	Clay	(Montenegro) Danka Kovinić	1–6, 2–6
Loss	8–13	Jun 2015	Open de Marseille, France	100,000	Clay	(Romania) Monica Niculescu	2–6, 5–7
Win	9–13	Jun 2015	Bredeney Ladies Open, Germany	25,000	Clay	(Switzerland) Viktorija Golubic	3–6, 7–6^{(4)}, 6–3
Loss	9–14	Nov 2015	Internationaux de Poitiers, France	100,000	Hard (i)	(Romania) Monica Niculescu	5–7, 2–6
Loss	9–15	Apr 2016	Open de Seine-et-Marne, France	50,000	Hard (i)	(Serbia) Ivana Jorović	1–6, 6–4, 4–6
Win	10–15	Jul 2016	Contrexéville Open, France	100,000	Clay	(France) Océane Dodin	6–1, 6–1

=== Doubles: 5 (3 titles, 2 runner-ups) ===
Legend $50,000 tournaments $25,000 tournaments $10,000 tournaments	Finals by surface Clay (3–2)

Result	W–L	Date	Tournament	Tier	Surface	Partner	Opponents	Score
Loss	0–1	Jul 2003	ITF Le Touquet, France	10,000	Clay	(Luxembourg) Mandy Minella	(Madagascar) Natacha Randriantefy (France) Aurélie Védy	2–6, 2–6
Win	1–1	Nov 2003	ITF Deauville, France	25,000	Clay (i)	(France) Aurélie Védy	(Bulgaria) Maria Geznenge (Czech Republic) Zuzana Hejdová	5–7, 6–2, 6–1
Win	2–1	Nov 2004	ITF Cairo, Egypt	10,000	Clay	(Czech Republic) Petra Cetkovská	(Russia) Galina Fokina (Russia) Raissa Gourevitch	6–4, 6–2
Loss	2–2	Jul 2009	Contrexéville Open, France	50,000	Clay	(France) Stéphanie Cohen-Aloro	(Austria) Yvonne Meusburger (Germany) Kathrin Wörle	2–6, 2–6
Win	3–2	Mar 2015	ITF Campinas, Brazil	25,000	Clay	(Australia) Olivia Rogowska	(Venezuela) Andrea Gámiz (Brazil) Paula Cristina Gonçalves	7–5, 4–6, [10–8]

== Top-10 wins per season ==
Season	2018	2019	Total
Wins	1	1	2

#	Player	Rank	Event	Surface	Rd	Score
2018
1.	(Denmark) Caroline Wozniacki	No. 2	Istanbul Cup, Turkey	Clay	QF	4–6, 6–3, ret.
2019
2.	(Ukraine) Elina Svitolina	No. 6	Madrid Open, Spain	Clay	1R	6–4, 7–6^{(8–6)}

== Fed Cup participation ==
Result	W–L	Date	Competition	Surface	Partner/Team	Opponents	Score
Loss	0–1	Nov 2016	Fed Cup, France	Hard (i)	(France) Caroline Garcia (France) Kristina Mladenovic (France) Alizé Cornet	(Czech Republic) Karolína Plíšková (Czech Republic) Lucie Hradecká (Czech Republic) Petra Kvitová (Czech Republic) Barbora Strýcová	2–3
