= 2010 Dow Corning Tennis Classic – Singles =

Singles
- 2010 Dow Corning Tennis Classic

Final
- Champion: (United Kingdom) Elena Baltacha
- Runner-up: (Czech Republic) Lucie Hradecká
- Score: 5–7, 6–2, 6–3

Events
Singles	Doubles
← 2009 ·	Dow Corning Tennis Classic	· 2011 →

The 2010 Dow Corning Tennis Classic singles was held in Midland, Michigan, USA.

Third seed Elena Baltacha defeated the top seed Lucie Hradecká in the finals to win the first edition of the Dow Corning Tennis Classic as a 100K tournament.

== Seeds ==
1. CZE Lucie Hradecká (Runner Up)
2. USA Vania King (round 1)
3. GBR Elena Baltacha (champion)
4. GBR Katie O'Brien (round 1)
5. SWE Sofia Arvidsson (Quarter finals)
6. SVK Kristína Kučová (round 1)
7. ROU Monica Niculescu (round 1)
8. NED Arantxa Rus (Quarter finals)

== Draw ==
Key

- Q = Qualifier
- WC = Wild card
- LL = Lucky loser
- Alt = Alternate
- ITF = ITF entry
- PR = Protected ranking
- SR = Special ranking
- SE = Special exempt
- JE = Junior exempt
- JR = Junior Accelerator Programme entrant
- CO = College Accelerator Programme entrant
- NG = Next Gen Accelerator Program entrant
- w/o = Walkover
- r = Retired
- d = Defaulted

=== Finals ===
Semifinals
1	(Czech Republic) Lucie Hradecká	6	6
(United States) Laura Granville	1	4
(Poland) Marta Domachowska	3	1
3	(United Kingdom) Elena Baltacha	6	6

Final
1	(Czech Republic) Lucie Hradecká	7	2	3
3	(United Kingdom) Elena Baltacha	5	6	6

=== Top half ===
First round
1	(Czech Republic) L Hradecká	6	6
(Russia) K Lykina	1	2
(Canada) V Tetreault	6	7
WC	(United States) J Hampton	3	5
Q	(France) Y Fedossova	6	5	5
(Germany) K Wörle	3	7	7
WC	(United States) J Cako	1	3
5	(Sweden) S Arvidsson	6	6
4	(United Kingdom) K O'Brien	2	3
SR	(United States) L Granville	6	6
(Georgia (country)) A Tatishvili	6	6
WC	(United States) C Dolehide	3	4
WC	(United Kingdom) H Watson	6	2	5
Q	(United States) B Capra	4	6	7
(Czech Republic) N Vaidišová	4	6^{10}
8	(Netherlands) A Rus	6	7^{12}

Second round
(United States) M Brengle	2	3
(Canada) R Marino	6	6
(France) S Beltrame	2	0
3	(United Kingdom) E Baltacha	6	6
(Greece) E Daniilidou	1	1
(United Kingdom) A Keothavong	6	6
(Poland) M Domachowska	6	6
(United States) L Osterloh	2	4

Quarterfinals
(Canada) R Marino	4	4
3	(United Kingdom) E Baltacha	6	6
(Poland) M Domachowska	4	7	6
(United Kingdom) A Keothavong	6	5	3

Semifinal
(Poland) M Domachowska	3	1
3	(United Kingdom) E Baltacha	6	6

=== Bottom half ===
First round
6	(Slovakia) K Kucova	7^{7}	1	2
(United States) M Brengle	6^{2}	6	6
(Canada) R Marino	6	4	6
(United States) A Haynes	2	6	4
Q	(United Kingdom) N Broady	6^{4}	6	4
(France) S Beltrame	7^{7}	4	6
Q	(Canada) M Drake	1	1
3	(United Kingdom) E Baltacha	6	6
(Greece) E Daniilidou	6	6
7	(Romania) M Niculescu	4	2
Q	(Croatia) I Lisjak	6	2	5
(United Kingdom) A Keothavong	3	6	7
(Australia) M Adamczak	2	4
(United States) L Osterloh	6	6
(Poland) M Domachowska	6	7
2	(United States) V King	1	5

Second round
(United States) M Brengle	2	3
(Canada) R Marino	6	6
(France) S Beltrame	2	0
3	(United Kingdom) E Baltacha	6	6
(Greece) E Daniilidou	1	1
(United Kingdom) A Keothavong	6	6
(Poland) M Domachowska	6	6
(United States) L Osterloh	2	4

Quarterfinals
(Canada) R Marino	4	4
3	(United Kingdom) E Baltacha	6	6
(Poland) M Domachowska	4	7	6
(United Kingdom) A Keothavong	6	5	3

Semifinal
(Poland) M Domachowska	3	1
3	(United Kingdom) E Baltacha	6	6

== See also ==
- 2010 Dow Corning Tennis Classic - Doubles
