= 2004 ITF Women's Circuit =

Details

Achievements (singles)

The ITF Women's Circuit is the second-tier tour for women's professional tennis organised by the International Tennis Federation, and is the tier below the WTA Tour. In 2004, the ITF Women's circuit included tournaments with prize money ranging from $10,000 to $75,000.

The ITF world champions in 2004 were Anastasia Myskina (senior singles), Virginia Ruano Pascual / Paola Suárez (senior doubles) and Michaëlla Krajicek (combined junior ranking).

== Tournament breakdown by region ==
Region	Number of events	Total prize money
Africa	17	$200,000
Asia	52	$1,000,000
Europe	195	$3,835,000
North America*	61	$1,715,000
Oceania	12	$225,000
South America	12	$135,000
Total	349	$7,110,000

*Includes figures for events in Central America and the Caribbean.

== Singles titles by nation ==
Rank	Nation	Titles won
1.	Czech Republic	27
1.	United States	27
3.	Spain	18
=	Russia	18
5.	Argentina	14
=	Germany	14
=	Romania	14
8.	France	13
=	India	13
10.	Australia	12
11.	Italy	11
12.	China	10
=	Hungary	10
=	Japan	10
15.	Serbia	9
16.	Brazil	8
=	(South Korea) Korea	8
=	Poland	8
19.	Netherlands	7
=	Portugal	7

This list displays only the top 20 nations in terms of singles titles wins.

== Sources ==
- List of ITF World Champions
- ITF prize money (1983–2008)
- ITF Pro Circuit Titles Won By Nations Players in 2004
