= 2003 ITF Women's Circuit =

Details

Achievements (singles)

The ITF Women's Circuit is the second-tier tour for women's professional tennis organised by the International Tennis Federation, and is the tier below the WTA Tour. In 2003, the ITF Women's circuit included tournaments with prize money ranging from $10,000 to $75,000. In addition to the traditional tournament format, there were also three four-week circuits each worth $40,000 in prize money.

The ITF world champions in 2003 were Justine Henin-Hardenne (senior singles), Virginia Ruano Pascual / Paola Suárez (senior doubles), Kirsten Flipkens (junior singles) and Andrea Hlaváčková (junior doubles).

== Tournament breakdown by region ==
Region	Number of events	Total prize money
Africa	16	$160,000
Asia	48	$820,000
Europe	179	$3,225,000
North America*	65	$1,770,000
Oceania	12	$225,000
South America	12	$135,000
Total	322	$6,335,000

*Includes information for events in Central America and the Caribbean

== Singles titles by nation ==
Rank	Nation	Titles won
1.	Czech Republic	23
2.	United States	18
3.	Spain	16
4.	Japan	15
5.	France	13
6.	Germany	12
7.	India	11
8.	Argentina	10
=	Australia	10
=	Croatia	10
=	Russia	10
12.	Austria	9
=	Brazil	9
=	Hungary	9
15.	Puerto Rico	8
=	Ukraine	8
17.	Italy	7
=	Romania	7
=	Slovakia	7
20.	Bulgaria	6
=	Netherlands	6
=	Chinese Taipei	6

This list displays only the top 22 nations in terms of singles titles wins.

== Sources ==
- List of ITF World Champions
- ITF prize money (1983–2008)
- ITF Pro Circuit Titles Won By Nations Players in 2003
