= 2007 Gastein Ladies =

- Date: 23–29 July
- Category: WTA Tour Tier III
- Draw: 32S / 16D
- Prize money: $175,000
- Surface: Clay - outdoor
- Location: Bad Gastein, Austria

Champions

Singles
- (Italy) Francesca Schiavone

Doubles
- (Czech Republic) Lucie Hradecká / (Czech Republic) Renata Voráčová
- WTA Austrian Open

The 2007 Gastein Ladies was a women's tennis tournament played on outdoor clay courts. It was the first edition of the Gastein Ladies, and was part of the Tier III series of the 2007 WTA Tour. It took place in Bad Gastein, Austria, from 23 July until 29 July 2008. First-seeded Francesca Schiavone won the singles title and earned $25,840 first-prize money.

== Finals ==
=== Singles ===
(Italy) Francesca Schiavone defeated (Austria) Yvonne Meusburger 6–1, 6–4

- It was Schiavone's first career singles title after losing in eight previous finals.

=== Doubles ===
(Czech Republic) Lucie Hradecká / (Czech Republic) Renata Voráčová defeated (Hungary) Ágnes Szávay / (Czech Republic) Vladimíra Uhlířová 6–3, 7–5
