= Women's World Tennis Tour =

Series of professional tennis tournaments

Tour logo

The Women's World Tennis Tour, previously known as the ITF Women's Circuit, is a series of professional tennis tournaments run by World Tennis (formerly the International Tennis Federation) for female professional tennis players.

== History ==
It serves as a developmental circuit for the WTA Tour, which is run by the independent Women's Tennis Association (WTA). There are several hundred World Tennis Tour tournaments each year, spread across all six inhabited continents, with prize money ranging from US$15,000 to US$100,000. Players who succeed on the Women's Tour earn sufficient points to be eligible for qualifying draw or main draw entry to WTA tournaments.

Until 2011 the ITF Women's Circuit was the level immediately below the main WTA Tour, but in 2012 the WTA introduced an intermediate level, the WTA 125 tournaments.

There is also a Men's World Tennis Tour, but it only incorporates the lower-level Futures tournaments. Mid-level men's tournaments, equivalent to the WTA 125 tournaments and the bigger money events on the Women's World Tennis Tour, fall under the jurisdiction of the ATP as part of the ATP Challenger Tour.

In 2019, reforms were made to the circuit, renaming it the ITF World Tennis Tour as a new umbrella name for former Pro Circuit and Junior Circuit tournaments and will serve as the player pathway between the junior game and the elite levels of professional tennis.

The launch of the tour is the culmination of a series of ITF reforms designed to support talented junior players in their progression to the senior game, and target the prize money effectively at professional tournaments to enable more players to make a living as professionals.

== Most Championships in the World Tennis Tour ==
=== Singles ===
Titles	Player
33	(Netherlands) Arantxa Rus
30	(Chile) Fernanda Brito
27	(Taiwan) Hsieh Su-wei
27	(Bulgaria) Isabella Shinikova
26	(Italy) / (Switzerland) Romina Oprandi
25	(Romania) Cristina Dinu
25	(Hungary) Réka Luca Jani
24	(Spain) Nuria Párrizas Díaz
24	(Russia) Victoria Kan
24	(China) Zhang Shuai
23	(Brazil) Maria Fernanda Alves
23	(Romania) Mihaela Buzărnescu
23	(Czech Republic) Petra Cetkovská
23	(South Africa) Chanel Simmonds
22	(Australia) Casey Dellacqua
22	(Russia) Vitalia Diatchenko
22	(Brazil) Teliana Pereira
22	(Germany) Anne Schäfer
21	(United States) Madison Brengle
21	(Estonia) Kaia Kanepi
21	(Israel) Deniz Khazaniuk
21	(Romania) Patricia Maria Țig
20	(Sweden) Sofia Arvidsson
20	(Hungary) Melinda Czink
20	(Italy) Anastasia Grymalska
20	(Czech Republic) Lucie Hradecká
20	(United Kingdom) Anne Keothavong
20	(Germany) Tatjana Maria
20	(Romania) Andreea Mitu
20	(Czech Republic) Zuzana Ondrášková
20	(Spain) Laura Pous Tió
20	(Egypt) Sandra Samir
20	(United Kingdom) Katie Swan

=== Doubles ===
Titles	Player
60	(Argentina) María Irigoyen
59	(Czech Republic) Renata Voráčová
58	(Brazil) Maria Fernanda Alves
56	(Australia) Lisa McShea
55	(Czech Republic) Gabriela Chmelinová
54	(Greece) Sapfo Sakellaridi
53	(Romania) Laura Ioana Paar
50	(Ukraine) Valeriya Strakhova
49	(Romania) Diana Enache
49	(Taiwan) Chan Chin-wei
48	(Poland) Olga Brózda
47	(North Macedonia) Lina Gjorcheska
45	(Japan) Erika Sema
44	(Finland) Emma Laine
44	(Brazil) Laura Pigossi
44	(Russia) Yana Sizikova
43	(Bosnia and Herzegovina) Mervana Jugić-Salkić
42	(Russia) \ (Australia) Arina Rodionova

== Seasons ==
- 2001 ITF Women's Circuit
- 2002 ITF Women's Circuit
- 2003 ITF Women's Circuit
- 2004 ITF Women's Circuit
- 2005 ITF Women's Circuit
- 2006 ITF Women's Circuit
- 2007 ITF Women's Circuit
- 2008 ITF Women's Circuit
- 2009 ITF Women's Circuit
- 2010 ITF Women's Circuit
- 2011 ITF Women's Circuit
- 2012 ITF Women's Circuit
- 2013 ITF Women's Circuit
- 2014 ITF Women's Circuit
- 2015 ITF Women's Circuit
- 2016 ITF Women's Circuit
- 2017 ITF Women's Circuit
- 2018 ITF Women's Circuit
- 2019 ITF Women's World Tennis Tour
- 2020 ITF Women's World Tennis Tour
- 2021 ITF Women's World Tennis Tour
- 2022 ITF Women's World Tennis Tour
- 2023 ITF Women's World Tennis Tour
- 2024 ITF Women's World Tennis Tour
- 2025 ITF Women's World Tennis Tour
- 2026 ITF Women's World Tennis Tour
