= 2013 Australian Open – Day-by-day summaries =

The 2013 Australian Open described in detail, in the form of day-by-day summaries.

== Day 1 (14 January) ==
In men's singles, on the opening day, play began with the defending champion and world no. 1, Novak Djokovic, dismantling Frenchman Paul-Henri Mathieu. The other top seeds cruised through with 4th-seed David Ferrer winning over Olivier Rochus and 5th-seed Tomáš Berdych over Michael Russell. Last year's quarterfinalist Kei Nishikori also came through over Victor Hănescu. Former finalist Marcos Baghdatis struggled to get past Spaniard Albert Ramos, winning in five sets; another seed in Fernando Verdasco, who was a former semifinalist, was also pushed to his limits, winning in 5 over David Goffin. All other seeds came through with the exception of 11th seed Juan Mónaco who lost to Andrey Kuznetsov after suffering from a back injury. The Australians didn't have a good day with all three that competed in the day losing. The first of which was Matthew Ebden falling to 23rd seed Mikhail Youzhny despite leading 2 sets to 0. His exit was followed by Australian wildcard John Millman who fell also in five to Tatsuma Ito. In the final men's match of the day, 8th seed Janko Tipsarević defeated former world no. 1 Lleyton Hewitt in three tight sets.

In women's singles, world no. 2 and last year's finalist Maria Sharapova defeated compatriot Olga Puchkova in 55 minutes. 4th seed Agnieszka Radwańska struggled but got through Australian wild card Bojana Bobusic to protect her record of 10–0 matches won all in straight sets in 2013. Other Australians fell as well with Ashleigh Barty losing to 15th seed Dominika Cibulková, Casey Dellacqua losing to Madison Keys, Sacha Jones losing to Kristýna Plíšková, and Olivia Rogowska losing to Vesna Dolonc. The only Australian to win in the day was 9th seed Samantha Stosur, ending her six-match losing streak in Australia to Chang Kai-chen. Venus Williams cruised past her first-round match over Galina Voskoboeva. Li Na, the 2011 finalist and 6th seed, also won over Sesil Karatantcheva. 11th seed Marion Bartoli needed an hour and forty minutes in a win over Anabel Medina Garrigues. The only seed to fall was 32nd seed Mona Barthel losing to Ksenia Pervak.

- Day 1 attendance: 61,955
- Seeds out:
  - Men's singles: (Argentina) Juan Mónaco [11]
  - Women's singles: (Germany) Mona Barthel [32]
- Schedule of Play

Matches on main courts
Matches on Rod Laver Arena
Event	Winner	Loser	Score
Women's singles 1st round	(Russia) Maria Sharapova [2]	(Russia) Olga Puchkova	6–0, 6–0
Women's singles 1st round	(Australia) Samantha Stosur [9]	(Chinese Taipei) Chang Kai-chen	7–6^{(7–3)}, 6–3
Men's singles 1st round	(Serbia) Novak Djokovic [1]	(France) Paul-Henri Mathieu	6–2, 6–4, 7–5
Men's singles 1st round	(Serbia) Janko Tipsarević [8]	(Australia) Lleyton Hewitt	7–6^{(7–4)}, 7–5, 6–3
Women's singles 1st round	(Serbia) Ana Ivanovic [13]	(Hungary) Melinda Czink	6–2, 6–1
Matches on Hisense Arena
Event	Winner	Loser	Score
Women's singles 1st round	(United States) Venus Williams [25]	(Kazakhstan) Galina Voskoboeva	6–1, 6–0
Men's singles 1st round	(Spain) Fernando Verdasco [22]	(Belgium) David Goffin	6–3, 3–6, 4–6, 6–3, 6–4
Women's singles 1st round	(Slovakia) Dominika Cibulková [15]	(Australia) Ashleigh Barty [WC]	3–6, 6–0, 6–1
Men's singles 1st round	(Spain) David Ferrer [4]	(Belgium) Olivier Rochus	6–3, 6–4, 6–2
Matches on Margaret Court Arena
Event	Winner	Loser	Score
Women's singles 1st round	(China) Li Na [6]	(Kazakhstan) Sesil Karatantcheva	6–1, 6–3
Women's singles 1st round	(Poland) Agnieszka Radwańska [4]	(Australia) Bojana Bobusic [WC]	7–5, 6–0
Men's singles 1st round	(Russia) Mikhail Youzhny [23]	(Australia) Matthew Ebden	4–6, 6–7^{(0–7)}, 6–2, 7–6^{(7–4)}, 6–3
Women's singles 1st round	(United States) Madison Keys [WC]	(Australia) Casey Dellacqua	6–4, 7–6^{(7–0)}
Men's singles 1st round	(Cyprus) Marcos Baghdatis [28]	(Spain) Albert Ramos	6–7^{(0–7)}, 7–6^{(7–4)}, 6–4, 3–6, 6–3
Colored background indicates a night match
Matches started at 11:00 am. Night matches did not start before 7:00 pm.

== Day 2 (15 January) ==
In men's singles, World no. 3 and US Open champion Andy Murray started things off in his half with an over Robin Haase. world no. 2 and Wimbledon champion Roger Federer made quick work of Benoît Paire. Other top seeds, 7th seed Jo-Wilfried Tsonga and 6th seed Juan Martín del Potro also got through over Frenchmen Michaël Llodra and Adrian Mannarino, respectively. Other seeds also came through with 9th seed Richard Gasquet winning over Albert Montañés, 12th seed Marin Čilić defeating Marinko Matosevic, and 13th seed Milos Raonic winning over Jan Hájek. Australians Luke Saville and John-Patrick Smith fell to Go Soeda and to João Sousa. In the battle of the Aussie wildcards James Duckworth outlasted compatriot Ben Mitchell. Australian hope Bernard Tomic made quick work of Leonardo Mayer. Many seeds fell in the day; 18th seed Alexandr Dolgopolov losing to Gaël Monfils, and was joined by 19th seed Tommy Haas, 27th seed Martin Kližan, and 29th seed Thomaz Bellucci.

In women's singles, day two play began with the defending champion and top seeded, Victoria Azarenka came through with a victory over the often-unpredictable Monica Niculescu. Serena Williams continued her good form with a win over Edina Gallovits-Hall, despite twisting her ankle at the 5th game of the first set. 8th seed Petra Kvitová struggled to get past Francesca Schiavone, winning. 10th seed and former world no. 1 Caroline Wozniacki also needed 3 sets against Sabine Lisicki winning despite being down 0–3 in the third. Other seeds Maria Kirilenko and Sloane Stephens got through with wins over Vania King and Simona Halep respectively. 20th seed Yanina Wickmayer ended the hopes of Australian Jarmila Gajdošová with a win. The biggest upset of the day and the tournament so far was when 7th seed and last year's quarterfinalist Sara Errani fell to Spaniard Carla Suárez Navarro. Another major upset was when Kimiko Date-Krumm became the oldest woman in the Open era to win a main draw match at the Australian Open with a victory over 12th seed Nadia Petrova. Other upsets included 24th seed and Brisbane finalist Anastasia Pavlyuchenkova losing to Lesia Tsurenko, 28th seed Yaroslava Shvedova losing to Annika Beck, and 31st seed Urszula Radwańska to Jamie Hampton.

- Day 2 attendance: 68,055
- Seeds out:
  - Men's Singles: (Ukraine) Alexandr Dolgopolov [18], (Germany) Tommy Haas [19], (Slovakia) Martin Kližan [27], (Brazil) Thomaz Bellucci [29]
  - Women's Singles: (Italy) Sara Errani [7], (Russia) Nadia Petrova [12], (Russia) Anastasia Pavlyuchenkova [24], (Kazakhstan) Yaroslava Shvedova [28], (Poland) Urszula Radwańska [31]
- Schedule of Play

Matches on main courts
Matches on Rod Laver Arena
Event	Winner	Loser	Score
Men's singles 1st round	(United Kingdom) Andy Murray [3]	(Netherlands) Robin Haase	6–3, 6–1, 6–3
Women's singles 1st round	(Belarus) Victoria Azarenka [1]	(Romania) Monica Niculescu	6–1, 6–4
Men's singles 1st round	(Switzerland) Roger Federer [2]	(France) Benoît Paire	6–2, 6–4, 6–1
Men's singles 1st round	(Australia) Bernard Tomic	(Argentina) Leonardo Mayer	6–3, 6–2, 6–3
Women's singles 1st round	(Belgium) Yanina Wickmayer [20]	(Australia) Jarmila Gajdošová [WC]	6–1, 7–5
Matches on Hisense Arena
Event	Winner	Loser	Score
Women's singles 1st round	(Denmark) Caroline Wozniacki [10]	(Germany) Sabine Lisicki	2–6, 6–3, 6–3
Women's singles 1st round	(United States) Serena Williams [3]	(Romania) Edina Gallovits-Hall	6–0, 6–0
Men's singles 1st round	(France) Jo-Wilfried Tsonga [7]	(France) Michaël Llodra	6–4, 7–5, 6–2
Men's singles 1st round	(Argentina) Juan Martín del Potro [6]	(France) Adrian Mannarino [Q]	6–1, 6–2, 6–2
Matches on Margaret Court Arena
Event	Winner	Loser	Score
Women's singles 1st round	(Spain) Carla Suárez Navarro	(Italy) Sara Errani [7]	6–4, 6–4
Women's singles 1st round	(Czech Republic) Petra Kvitová [8]	(Italy) Francesca Schiavone	6–4, 2–6, 6–2
Women's singles 1st round	(United States) Sloane Stephens [29]	(Romania) Simona Halep	6–1, 6–1
Men's singles 1st round	(Croatia) Marin Čilić [12]	(Australia) Marinko Matosevic	6–4, 7–5, 6–2
Men's singles 1st round	(France) Gaël Monfils	(Ukraine) Alexandr Dolgopolov [18]	6–7^{(7–9)}, 7–6^{(7–4)}, 6–3, 6–3
Coloured background indicates a night match
Matches started at 11:00 am. Night matches did not start before 7:00 pm.

== Day 3 (16 January) ==
In men's singles, It was 4th seed David Ferrer who started things off with a win over American lucky loser Tim Smyczek. He was joined in the third round by 5th seeded Czech Tomáš Berdych, who defeated Guillaume Rufin. Two other seeded Spaniards came through with 10th seed Nicolás Almagro defeating compatriot Daniel Gimeno-Traver and former semifinalist Fernando Verdasco who came through with ease against Xavier Malisse. Japanese Kei Nishikori triumph against opponent Carlos Berlocq to advance to the third round. In the battle of the Americans Sam Querrey took on Brian Baker and won when Baker retired when he was leading. Cypriot Marcos Baghdatis came back against Tatsuma Ito recovering from a slow start. The only seed to fall was 23rd seed Mikhail Youzhny, when he lost to compatriot Evgeny Donskoy. In the final match of the day, 2-time defending champion Novak Djokovic made quick work of American Ryan Harrison.

In women's singles, Angelique Kerber was the first to advance to the 3rd round with a victory over Czech Lucie Hradecká. She was joined by Wimbledon finalist Agnieszka Radwańska who remains undefeated in 2013 defeating Irina-Camelia Begu. Serbians 13th seed Ana Ivanovic and 22nd seed Jelena Janković both won against Chan Yung-jan and Maria João Koehler respectively to set up a third round clash. Julia Görges is also quietly going about the draw with a win over Romina Oprandi 2nd seed Maria Sharapova won 24 straight games with another win over Misaki Doi. Venus Williams also got through easily over France's Alizé Cornet to set up a third-round meeting with Sharapova. However, Australia's hope Samantha Stosur wasn't so fortunate leading the falling seeds when she lost to Zheng Jie after leading and serving for the match at 5–2 in the third set. Stosur was joined by other seeds Sydney finalistDominika Cibulková, Klára Zakopalová, Tamira Paszek.

- Day 3 attendance: 66,568
- Seeds out:
  - Men's Singles: (Russia) Mikhail Youzhny [23]
  - Women's Singles: (Australia) Samantha Stosur [9], (Slovakia) Dominika Cibulková [15], (Czech Republic) Klára Zakopalová [23], (Austria) Tamira Paszek [30]
  - Men's Doubles: (Croatia) Ivan Dodig / (Brazil) Marcelo Melo [10], (Mexico) Santiago González / (United States) Scott Lipsky [13], (Austria) Julian Knowle / (Slovakia) Filip Polášek [14], (Czech Republic) František Čermák / (Slovakia) Michal Mertiňák [15]
  - Women's Doubles: (United States) Bethanie Mattek-Sands / (India) Sania Mirza [10], (United States) Vania King / (Kazakhstan) Yaroslava Shvedova [11]
- Schedule of Play

Matches on main courts
Matches on Rod Laver Arena
Event	Winner	Loser	Score
Women's singles 2nd round	(Poland) Agnieszka Radwańska [4]	(Romania) Irina-Camelia Begu	6–3, 6–3
Men's singles 2nd round	(Czech Republic) Tomáš Berdych [5]	(France) Guillaume Rufin	6–2, 6–2, 6–4
Women's singles 2nd round	(China) Zheng Jie	(Australia) Samantha Stosur [9]	6–4, 1–6, 7–5
Women's singles 2nd round	(United States) Venus Williams [25]	(France) Alizé Cornet	6–3, 6–3
Men's singles 2nd round	(Serbia) Novak Djokovic [1]	(United States) Ryan Harrison	6–1, 6–2, 6–3
Matches on Hisense Arena
Event	Winner	Loser	Score
Men's singles 2nd round	(Spain) Nicolás Almagro [10]	(Spain) Daniel Gimeno-Traver	6–4, 6–1, 6–2
Women's singles 2nd round	(China) Li Na [6]	(Belarus) Olga Govortsova	6–2, 7–5
Men's singles 2nd round	(Cyprus) Marcos Baghdatis [28]	(Japan) Tatsuma Ito	3–6, 6–3, 6–2, 6–2
Women's singles 2nd round	(Russia) Maria Sharapova [2]	(Japan) Misaki Doi	6–0, 6–0
Matches on Margaret Court Arena
Event	Winner	Loser	Score
Women's singles 2nd round	(Germany) Angelique Kerber [5]	(Czech Republic) Lucie Hradecká	6–3, 6–1
Women's singles 2nd round	(Germany) Julia Görges [18]	(Switzerland) Romina Oprandi	6–3, 6–2
Men's singles 2nd round	(Spain) David Ferrer [4]	(United States) Tim Smyczek [LL]	6–0, 7–5, 4–6, 6–3
Women's singles 2nd round	(Serbia) Ana Ivanovic [13]	(Chinese Taipei) Chan Yung-jan [Q]	7–5, 1–6, 6–4
Men's singles 2nd round	(Spain) Fernando Verdasco [22]	(Belgium) Xavier Malisse	6–1, 6–3, 6–2
Coloured background indicates a night match
Matches started at 11:00 am. Night matches did not start before 7:00 pm.

== Day 4 (17 January) ==
In men's singles, day four play began with British Andy Murray having an easy win over Portuguese João Sousa. Frenchman Jo-Wilfried Tsonga overcomes Japanese Go Soeda in three tight sets, while compatriot Richard Gasquet made quick work of Alejandro Falla. Big serving Canadian and 13th seed Milos Raonic stormed pass Lukáš Rosol. The Australians had mixed results with James Duckworth falling to Blaž Kavčič in a tight five setter and with Bernard Tomic winning in a tight four setter over German qualifier Daniel Brands. Sixth seed Juan Martín del Potro continues with ease winning over Benjamin Becker. 17-time slam champion Roger Federer defeated a resurgent Nikolay Davydenko. Two seeds fell, with 25th seed Florian Mayer losing convincingly to Lithuanian qualifier Ričardas Berankis, and 30th seed Marcel Granollers falling to Jérémy Chardy. Frenchman Gaël Monfils outlasted Chinese Taipei's Lu Yen-hsun.

In women's singles, day four play began with the defending champion and top seeded Belarusian Victoria Azarenka dismantling Greek Eleni Daniilidou. Russian 14th seed Maria Kirilenko also got through with a win over Peng Shuai. American and third seed Serena Williams made quick work of Spaniard Garbiñe Muguruza; however, Williams had another incident when she hit her face with a racket. Another American Sloane Stephens also got through the 3rd round win over fellow 19-year-old Kristina Mladenovic. Former world no. 1 Caroline Wozniacki also got through with a win over 16-year-old Donna Vekić. Forty-two-year-old Kimiko Date-Krumm continued her run defeating Shahar Pe'er. In the final match of the day 8th seed Petra Kvitová continues her bad form falling to Australian-born Brit Laura Robson in a match that had 30 doubles faults combined 18 from the Czech and 12 from the Brit. Other seeds that fell were 17th seed Lucie Šafářová, 21st seed Varvara Lepchenko, and 26th seed Hsieh Su-wei all falling in straight sets.

- Day 4 attendance: 55,671
- Seeds out:
  - Men's Singles: (Germany) Florian Mayer [25], (Spain) Marcel Granollers [30]
  - Women's Singles: (Czech Republic) Petra Kvitová [8], (Czech Republic) Lucie Šafářová [17], (United States) Varvara Lepchenko [21], (Chinese Taipei) Hsieh Su-wei [26]
  - Men's Doubles: (India) Leander Paes / (Czech Republic) Radek Štěpánek [2], (Poland) Mariusz Fyrstenberg / (Poland) Marcin Matkowski [8]
  - Women's Doubles: (Slovakia) Daniela Hantuchová / (Spain) Anabel Medina Garrigues [16]
- Schedule of Play

Matches on main courts
Matches on Rod Laver Arena
Event	Winner	Loser	Score
Women's singles 2nd round	(Belarus) Victoria Azarenka [1]	(Greece) Eleni Daniilidou	6–1, 6–0
Women's singles 2nd round	(United States) Serena Williams [3]	(Spain) Garbiñe Muguruza	6–2, 6–0
Men's singles 2nd round	(Australia) Bernard Tomic	(Germany) Daniel Brands [Q]	6–7^{(4–7)}, 7–5, 7–6^{(7–3)}, 7–6^{(10–8)}
Men's singles 2nd round	(Switzerland) Roger Federer [2]	(Russia) Nikolay Davydenko	6–3, 6–4, 6–4
Women's singles 2nd round	(United Kingdom) Laura Robson	(Czech Republic) Petra Kvitová [8]	2–6, 6–3, 11–9
Matches on Hisense Arena
Event	Winner	Loser	Score
Women's singles 2nd round	(Russia) Maria Kirilenko [14]	(China) Peng Shuai	7–5, 6–2
Men's singles 2nd round	(United Kingdom) Andy Murray [3]	(Portugal) João Sousa	6–2, 6–2, 6–4
Women's singles 2nd round	(Denmark) Caroline Wozniacki [10]	(Croatia) Donna Vekić	6–1, 6–4
Men's singles 2nd round	(France) Gaël Monfils	(Chinese Taipei) Lu Yen-hsun	7–6^{(7–5)}, 4–6, 0–6, 6–1, 8–6
Matches on Margaret Court Arena
Event	Winner	Loser	Score
Men's singles 2nd round	(France) Jo-Wilfried Tsonga [7]	(Japan) Go Soeda	6–3, 7–6^{(7–1)}, 6–3
Women's singles 2nd round	(Russia) Svetlana Kuznetsova	(Chinese Taipei) Hsieh Su-wei [26]	6–2, 6–1
Women's doubles 1st round	(Germany) Julia Görges (Australia) Samantha Stosur	(Slovakia) Daniela Hantuchová (Spain) Anabel Medina Garrigues [16]	6–3, 6–1
Men's doubles 1st round	(Cyprus) Marcos Baghdatis (Bulgaria) Grigor Dimitrov	(Australia) Matthew Ebden (United States) Ryan Harrison	7–6^{(8–6)}, 6–2
Men's singles 2nd round	(Argentina) Juan Martín del Potro [6]	(Germany) Benjamin Becker	6–2, 6–4, 6–2
Coloured background indicates a night match
Matches started at 11:00 am. Night matches did not start before 7:00 pm.

== Day 5 (18 January) ==
In men's singles, day five play began with the defending champion and top seeded Serbian Novak Djokovic who was tested by Czech Radek Štěpánek in three sets. His fellow Serb and 8th seed Janko Tipsarević was pushed by Frenchman Julien Benneteau but won in 5 sets. 16th seed Kei Nishikori cruised pass Evgeny Donskoy after a sluggish start winning in straights. 10th seed Nicolás Almagro made to work hard as well in three over 24th seed Jerzy Janowicz. Swiss Stanislas Wawrinka ended the hopes of American tennis in the men's side when he defeated Sam Querrey in tight three sets. South African Kevin Anderson was the only lower ranked player in the day to win when he defeated 22nd seed Fernando Verdasco. At the night session, 5th seed Tomáš Berdych continues to cruise, winning over Jürgen Melzer. In the final match of the day Spaniard David Ferrer got into the third round winning over former finalist Marcos Baghdatis

In women's singles, day five play began with Polish Agnieszka Radwańska defeating British Heather Watson to continue her undefeated 2013 run. Celebrating her birthday Angelique Kerber got a great present defeating American wildcard Madison Keys. Another German Julia Görges got through the fourth round with a win over Zheng Jie after coming from 4–5 down with Zheng serving for the match. world No.19 Ekaterina Makarova downed French world No.11 Marion Bartoli in three tight sets. In the battle of the Serbs and former world no. 1's Ana Ivanovic dispatched Jelena Janković. China's Li Na continues her good 2013 run with a win over Romania's Sorana Cîrstea. Belgium's Kirsten Flipkens defeated Russia's Valeria Savinykh to advance to her first slam fourth round. In the blockbuster match of the tournament so far, it saw Maria Sharapova defeating Venus Williams with relative ease.

- Day 5 attendance: 70,426
- Seeds out:
  - Men's Singles: (United States) Sam Querrey [20], (Spain) Fernando Verdasco [22], (Poland) Jerzy Janowicz [24], (Austria) Jürgen Melzer [26], (Cyprus) Marcos Baghdatis [28], (Czech Republic) Radek Štěpánek [31], (France) Julien Benneteau [32]
  - Women's Singles: (France) Marion Bartoli [11], (Serbia) Jelena Janković [22], (United States) Venus Williams [25], (Romania) Sorana Cîrstea [27]
  - Women's Doubles: (Czech Republic) Andrea Hlaváčková / (Czech Republic) Lucie Hradecká [2], (Russia) Maria Kirilenko / (United States) Lisa Raymond [3], (United States) Raquel Kops-Jones / (United States) Abigail Spears [8]
- Schedule of Play

Matches on main courts
Matches on Rod Laver Arena
Event	Winner	Loser	Score
Women's singles 3rd round	(Germany) Angelique Kerber [5]	(United States) Madison Keys [WC]	6–2, 7–5
Women's singles 3rd round	(China) Li Na [6]	(Romania) Sorana Cîrstea [27]	6–4, 6–1
Men's singles 3rd round	(Serbia) Novak Djokovic [1]	(Czech Republic) Radek Štěpánek [31]	6–4, 6–3, 7–5
Women's singles 3rd round	(Russia) Maria Sharapova [2]	(United States) Venus Williams [25]	6–1, 6–3
Men's singles 3rd round	(Spain) David Ferrer [4]	(Cyprus) Marcos Baghdatis [28]	6–4, 6–2, 6–3
Matches on Hisense Arena
Event	Winner	Loser	Score
Women's singles 3rd round	(Poland) Agnieszka Radwańska [4]	(United Kingdom) Heather Watson	6–3, 6–1
Women's singles 3rd round	(Serbia) Ana Ivanovic [13]	(Serbia) Jelena Janković [22]	7–5, 6–3
Men's singles 3rd round	(South Africa) Kevin Anderson	(Spain) Fernando Verdasco [22]	4–6, 6–3, 4–6, 7–6^{(7–4)}, 6–2
Men's singles 3rd round	(Czech Republic) Tomáš Berdych [5]	(Austria) Jürgen Melzer [26]	6–3, 6–2, 6–2
Mixed doubles 1st round	(India) Sania Mirza [3] (United States) Bob Bryan [3]	(Australia) Samantha Stosur [WC] (Australia) Luke Saville [WC]	6–2, 6–2
Matches on Margaret Court Arena
Event	Winner	Loser	Score
Women's singles 3rd round	(Russia) Ekaterina Makarova [19]	(France) Marion Bartoli [11]	6–7^{(4–7)}, 6–3, 6–4
Men's singles 3rd round	(Serbia) Janko Tipsarević [8]	(France) Julien Benneteau [32]	3–6, 6–4, 2–6, 6–4, 6–3
Men's singles 3rd round	(Switzerland) Stanislas Wawrinka [15]	(United States) Sam Querrey [20]	7–6^{(8–6)}, 7–5, 6–4
Men's doubles 2nd round	(Italy) Daniele Bracciali (Czech Republic) Lukáš Dlouhý	(Australia) Alex Bolt [WC] (Australia) Greg Jones [WC]	6–2, 7–6^{(7–4)}
Coloured background indicates a night match
Matches started at 11:00 am. Night matches did not start before 7:00 pm.

== Day 6 (19 January) ==
In the Men's Singles, Frenchman Richard Gasquet who got to the fourth round in the bottom half first when he defeated Ivan Dodig. He was followed by Olympic gold medalist Andy Murray who defeated Lithuanian qualifier Ričardas Berankis in three tight sets. It was followed by the biggest upset of the tournament so far when 6th seed Juan Martín del Potro fell to unseeded Frenchman Jérémy Chardy. It was followed by another upset when 21st Andreas Seppi eliminating 12th seed Marin Čilić. Jo-Wilfried Tsonga then made quick work of Slovenian Blaž Kavčič to face Gasquet in the next round. Canadian Milos Raonic defeated Philipp Kohlschreiber. In the night session, in the anticipated match between Roger Federer and the only Australian to get to the third round Bernard Tomic, Federer came through. In the most dramatic match of the tournament so far it was a battle of sheer guts and determination as both struggled with injury as two Frenchmen Gilles Simon who struggled through leg and forearm cramps, while Gaël Monfils battled hand blisters. The match saw a 71-shot rally, one of the many long rallies in the match. Simon outlasted Monfils winning.

In the Women's Singles, it was 14th seed Russian Maria Kirilenko was the first victor of the day when she defeated 20th seed Belgian Yanina Wickmayer. Another Russian in Svetlana Kuznetsova got through the 4th round defeating Carla Suárez Navarro World no. 1 and defending champion Victoria Azarenka got her first challenge in the match in American Jamie Hampton winning in three sets. Serena Williams continues her winning streak defeating Ayumi Morita, winning the last 6 games and saw Williams serve her second 207 km/h serve in the tournament. Another Russian made it through the 4th round in Elena Vesnina when she upset 16th seed Roberta Vinci, making it 5 Russians in the fourth round. Dane Caroline Wozniacki is slowly getting into the draw with a win over Qualifier Lesia Tsurenko. In the battle of the youngsters American Sloane Stephens defeated Brit Laura Robson. The dream run of 42-year-old Kimiko Date-Krumm came to an end in the third round, with 21-year-old Bojana Jovanovski taking her out with a loss.

- Day 6 attendance: 80,735
- Seeds out:
  - Men's Singles: (Argentina) Juan Martín del Potro [6], (Croatia) Marin Čilić [12], (Germany) Philipp Kohlschreiber [17]
  - Women's Singles: (Italy) Roberta Vinci [16], (Belgium) Yanina Wickmayer [20]
  - Men's Doubles: (Belarus) Max Mirnyi / (Romania) Horia Tecău [4], (Sweden) Robert Lindstedt / (Serbia) Nenad Zimonjić [7], (Austria) Alexander Peya / (Brazil) Bruno Soares [9], (India) Rohan Bopanna / (United States) Rajeev Ram [12], (United Kingdom) Jonathan Marray / (Brazil) André Sá [16]
  - Women's Doubles: (Germany) Anna-Lena Grönefeld / (Czech Republic) Květa Peschke [9]
- Schedule of Play

Matches on main courts
Matches on Rod Laver Arena
Event	Winner	Loser	Score
Women's singles 3rd round	(Belarus) Victoria Azarenka [1]	(United States) Jamie Hampton	6–4, 4–6, 6–2
Women's singles 3rd round	(United States) Serena Williams [3]	(Japan) Ayumi Morita	6–1, 6–3
Men's singles 3rd round	(United Kingdom) Andy Murray [3]	(Lithuania) Ričardas Berankis [Q]	6–3, 6–4, 7–5
Men's singles 3rd round	(Switzerland) Roger Federer [2]	(Australia) Bernard Tomic	6–4, 7–6^{(7–5)}, 6–1
Mixed doubles 1st round	(Czech Republic) Andrea Hlaváčková [7] (Italy) Daniele Bracciali [7]	(Australia) Casey Dellacqua [WC] (Australia) John-Patrick Smith [WC]	7–6^{(7–3)}, 7–6^{(7–4)}
Matches on Hisense Arena
Event	Winner	Loser	Score
Women's singles 3rd round	(Russia) Maria Kirilenko [14]	(Belgium) Yanina Wickmayer [20]	7–6^{(7–4)}, 6–3
Men's singles 3rd round	(France) Jérémy Chardy	(Argentina) Juan Martín del Potro [6]	6–3, 6–3, 6–7^{(3–7)}, 3–6, 6–3
Women's singles 3rd round	(Denmark) Caroline Wozniacki [10]	(Ukraine) Lesia Tsurenko [Q]	6–4, 6–3
Men's singles 3rd round	(France) Gilles Simon [14]	(France) Gaël Monfils	6–4, 6–4, 4–6, 1–6, 8–6
Men legends' doubles	(Croatia) Goran Ivanišević / (France) Cédric Pioline vs (France) Guy Forget / (France) Henri Leconte		Cancelled
Matches on Margaret Court Arena
Event	Winner	Loser	Score
Men legends' doubles	(Australia) Todd Woodbridge (Australia) Mark Woodforde	(Iran) Mansour Bahrami (South Africa) Wayne Ferreira	7–6^{(19–17)}, 6–4
Women's singles 3rd round	(Russia) Elena Vesnina	(Italy) Roberta Vinci [16]	4–6, 7–6^{(7–4)}, 6–4
Men's singles 3rd round	(France) Jo-Wilfried Tsonga [7]	(Slovenia) Blaž Kavčič	6–2, 6–1, 6–4
Women's doubles 2nd round	(United States) Serena Williams [12] (United States) Venus Williams [12]	(Russia) Vera Dushevina (Belarus) Olga Govortsova	6–1, 6–2
Women's doubles 2nd round	(Zimbabwe) Cara Black [WC] (Australia) Anastasia Rodionova [WC]	(Japan) Shuko Aoyama (United States) Irina Falconi	6–4, 6–4
Coloured background indicates a night match
Matches started at 11:00 am. Night matches did not start before 7:00 pm.

== Day 7 (20 January) ==
In the Men's Singles, It was a battle of last year's quarterfinalists 4th seed David Ferrer and 16th seed Kei Nishikori, Nishikori lead the head-to-head 2–1, but Ferrer proved to be too strong as he won easily. Ferrer will now face compatriot Nicolás Almagro who advance to the quarterfinals after Janko Tipsarević retired when Almagro was leading with a left foot injury. 5th seed Tomáš Berdych continues his good run and hasn't drop a set in the tournament with a win over Kevin Anderson The final match of the day was a marathon battle of wills between world no. 1 and defending champion Novak Djokovic and the no. 2 Swiss and 15th seed Stanislas Wawrinka. It went to five hour and two minutes before seeing Djokovic outlast Wawrinka, and has been rated the match of the tournament so far. Djokovic, showing great stamina, finally got hold of the match in a grueling last set. Wawrinka winning the first set 6–1, proved to be an unexpected competitor to Novak Djokovic. But, in the end, his sustenance was declined.

In the Women's Singles, last year's quarterfinalist Ekaterina Makarova provided the upset of the day after defeating 5th seed Angelique Kerber to reach her second straight quarterfinal at the Australian Open. world no. 2 Maria Sharapova continues her dominant force in the tournament with a victory over unseeded Kirsten Flipkens, which meant she has only lost 5 games en route to the quarterfinals, the fewest since 1988. China's Li Na reaches her first slam quarterfinal since her win at the 2011 French Open when she beat German Julia Görges. 4th seed Agnieszka Radwańska continues her undefeated run in 2013 when she got through 13th seed Ana Ivanovic in another straight sets win.

- Day 7 attendance: 62,812
- Seeds out:
  - Men's Singles: (Serbia) Janko Tipsarević [8], (Switzerland) Stanislas Wawrinka [15], (Japan) Kei Nishikori [16]
  - Women's Singles: (Germany) Angelique Kerber [5], (Serbia) Ana Ivanovic [13], (Germany) Julia Görges [18]
  - Men's Doubles: (Pakistan) Aisam-ul-Haq Qureshi / (Netherlands) Jean-Julien Rojer [6]
  - Women's Doubles: (Russia) Nadia Petrova / (Slovenia) Katarina Srebotnik [5], (United States) Liezel Huber / (Spain) María José Martínez Sánchez [6], (Romania) Irina-Camelia Begu / (Romania) Monica Niculescu [13], (Chinese Taipei) Hsieh Su-wei / (China) Peng Shuai [15]
- Schedule of Play

Matches on main courts
Matches on Rod Laver Arena
Event	Winner	Loser	Score
Women's singles 4th round	(Russia) Ekaterina Makarova [19]	(Germany) Angelique Kerber [5]	7–5, 6–4
Men's singles 4th round	(Spain) David Ferrer [4]	(Japan) Kei Nishikori [16]	6–2, 6–1, 6–4
Women's singles 4th round	(Russia) Maria Sharapova [2]	(Belgium) Kirsten Flipkens	6–1, 6–0
Women's singles 4th round	(Poland) Agnieszka Radwańska [4]	(Serbia) Ana Ivanovic [13]	6–2, 6–4
Men's singles 4th round	(Serbia) Novak Djokovic [1]	(Switzerland) Stanislas Wawrinka [15]	1–6, 7–5, 6–4, 6–7^{(5–7)}, 12–10
Matches on Hisense Arena
Event	Winner	Loser	Score
Men legends' doubles	(Netherlands) Jacco Eltingh (Netherlands) Paul Haarhuis	(Iran) Mansour Bahrami (South Africa) Wayne Ferreira	6–3, 6–4
Men's doubles 3rd round	(United States) Bob Bryan [1] (United States) Mike Bryan [1]	(France) Jérémy Chardy (Poland) Łukasz Kubot	6–7^{(4–7)}, 6–4, 6–3
Men's singles 4th round	(Spain) Nicolás Almagro [10]	(Serbia) Janko Tipsarević [8]	6–2, 5–1 retired
Women's singles 4th round	(China) Li Na [6]	(Germany) Julia Görges [18]	7–6^{(8–6)}, 6–1
Matches on Margaret Court Arena
Event	Winner	Loser	Score
Men legends' doubles	(Australia) Wayne Arthurs (Australia) Pat Cash	(Sweden) Thomas Enqvist (France) Fabrice Santoro	7–6^{(7–5)}, 6–7^{(3–7)}, [10–7]
Women's doubles 3rd round	(Italy) Sara Errani [1] (Italy) Roberta Vinci [1]	(Chinese Taipei) Hsieh Su-wei [15] (China) Peng Shuai [15]	6–4, 0–6, 7–5
Women's doubles 3rd round	(United States) Serena Williams [12] (United States) Venus Williams [12]	(Russia) Nadia Petrova [5] (Slovenia) Katarina Srebotnik [5]	6–2, 6–3
Men's singles 4th round	(Czech Republic) Tomáš Berdych [5]	(South Africa) Kevin Anderson	6–3, 6–2, 7–6^{(15–13)}
Coloured background indicates a night match
Matches started at 11:00 am. Night matches did not start before 7:00 pm.

== Day 8 (21 January) ==
In the Men's Singles, It was a match between Frenchman Jérémy Chardy and Italian Andreas Seppi, who are both trying to reach the quarterfinals of a slam for the first time. It was Chardy who came through in four sets, dominating the final three sets He was followed by compatriots 7th seed Jo-Wilfried Tsonga and 9th seed Richard Gasquet in an all French fourth round, where Tsonga came through in four sets as well. 3rd seed Andy Murray made quick work of a clearly hampered Gilles Simon winning. In the night match, Roger Federer took on another up-and-comer in Milos Raonic, the two battled it out in the first two sets with both going to Federer. Federer then cruised through the final set.

In the Women's Singles, former world no. 1 Caroline Wozniacki took on 2-time slam champion Svetlana Kuznetsova in a heavily contested match, which saw Kuznetsova prevailing in three sets to be the only woman in quarterfinals not to be seeded. After her third round scare, defending champion Victoria Azarenka made quick work of Russia's Elena Vesnina with a win in just 57 minutes. In a bother of the youngsters it was 19 year old Sloane Stephens and 21 year old Bojana Jovanovski, where the American Stephens came through against Serb Jovanovski in three sets. In the night match it was Serena Williams who claimed her 20th straight victory with a win over Maria Kirilenko, serving an impressive 87% of first serves in.

- Day 8 attendance: 44,902
- Seeds out:
  - Men's Singles: (France) Richard Gasquet [9], (Canada) Milos Raonic [13], (France) Gilles Simon [14], (Italy) Andreas Seppi [21]
  - Women's Singles: (Denmark) Caroline Wozniacki [10], (Russia) Maria Kirilenko [14]
  - Men's Doubles: (India) Mahesh Bhupathi / (Canada) Daniel Nestor [5]
  - Women's Doubles: (South Africa) Natalie Grandin / (Czech Republic) Vladimíra Uhlířová [14]
  - Mixed Doubles: (Czech Republic) Andrea Hlaváčková / (Italy) Daniele Bracciali [7]
- Schedule of Play

Matches on main courts
Matches on Rod Laver Arena
Event	Winner	Loser	Score
Women's singles 4th round	(Russia) Svetlana Kuznetsova	(Denmark) Caroline Wozniacki [10]	6–2, 2–6, 7–5
Women's singles 4th round	(Belarus) Victoria Azarenka [1]	(Russia) Elena Vesnina	6–1, 6–1
Men's singles 4th round	(France) Jo-Wilfried Tsonga [7]	(France) Richard Gasquet [9]	6–4, 3–6, 6–3, 6–2
Women's singles 4th round	(United States) Serena Williams [3]	(Russia) Maria Kirilenko [14]	6–2, 6–0
Men's singles 4th round	(Switzerland) Roger Federer [2]	(Canada) Milos Raonic [13]	6–4, 7–6^{(7–4)}, 6–2
Matches on Hisense Arena
Event	Winner	Loser	Score
Men legends' doubles	(Australia) Todd Woodbridge (Australia) Mark Woodforde	(Netherlands) Jacco Eltingh (Netherlands) Paul Haarhuis	7–5, 3–6, [10–3]
Men's singles 4th round	(France) Jérémy Chardy	(Italy) Andreas Seppi [21]	5–7, 6–3, 6–2, 6–2
Women's singles 4th round	(United States) Sloane Stephens [29]	(Serbia) Bojana Jovanovski	6–1, 3–6, 7–5
Men's singles 4th round	(United Kingdom) Andy Murray [3]	(France) Gilles Simon [14]	6–3, 6–1, 6–3
Matches on Margaret Court Arena
Event	Winner	Loser	Score
Women's doubles 3rd round	(United States) Varvara Lepchenko (China) Zheng Saisai	(Japan) Kimiko Date-Krumm (Spain) Arantxa Parra Santonja	3–6, 6–3, 7–6^{(7–5)}
Men's doubles 3rd round	(Colombia) Juan Sebastián Cabal (Colombia) Robert Farah	(Cyprus) Marcos Baghdatis (Bulgaria) Grigor Dimitrov	7–6^{(8–6)}, 7–6^{(7–5)}
Mixed doubles 2nd round	(India) Sania Mirza [3] (United States) Bob Bryan [3]	(United States) Abigail Spears (United States) Scott Lipsky	4–6, 6–1, [10–4]
Women's doubles 3rd round	(Australia) Ashleigh Barty [WC] (Australia) Casey Dellacqua [WC]	(South Africa) Natalie Grandin [14] (Czech Republic) Vladimíra Uhlířová [14]	7–6^{(7–3)}, 6–3
Women legends' doubles	(Switzerland) Martina Hingis (United States) Martina Navratilova	(United States) Lindsay Davenport (Zimbabwe) Cara Black	7–6^{(7–4)}
Coloured background indicates a night match
Matches started at 11:00 am. Night matches did not start before 7:30 pm.

== Day 9 (22 January) ==
In the Men's Singles, The first quarterfinal match of the tournament, between Spaniards 4th seed David Ferrer and 10th seed Nicolás Almagro in the third all-Spanish quarterfinal in the Australian Open. The higher-ranked Spaniard Ferrer came through despite Almagro serving for the match three times at 5–4 in the third, 5–4 in the fourth, and 6–5 in the fourth, though not having match points. In the night match, world no. 1 and 2-time defending champion Novak Djokovic scraped through in 4 sets against 5th seed Tomáš Berdych.

In the Women's Singles, the opener saw Poland's Agnieszka Radwańska take on China's Li Na. It was Li who took control of the match and advance to the semifinals with a win to end Radwańska's 13 match winning streak. In the second quarterfinals, it featured an all-Russian affair with a repeat of last year's quarterfinal between Maria Sharapova and Ekaterina Makarova, with Sharapova once again coming through with relative ease with a win.

- Day 9 attendance: 38,283
- Seeds out:
  - Men's Singles: (Czech Republic) Tomáš Berdych [5], (Spain) Nicolás Almagro [10]
  - Women's Singles: (Poland) Agnieszka Radwańska [4], (Russia) Ekaterina Makarova [19]
  - Men's Doubles: (Spain) David Marrero / (Spain) Fernando Verdasco [11]
  - Women's Doubles: (Spain) Nuria Llagostera Vives / (China) Zheng Jie [7], (United States) Serena Williams / (United States) Venus Williams [12]
  - Mixed Doubles: (Russia) Elena Vesnina / (India) Leander Paes [2]
- Schedule of Play

Matches on main courts
Matches on Rod Laver Arena
Event	Winner	Loser	Score
Women's singles quarterfinals	(China) Li Na [6]	(Poland) Agnieszka Radwańska [4]	7–5, 6–3
Men's singles quarterfinals	(Spain) David Ferrer [4]	(Spain) Nicolás Almagro [10]	4–6, 4–6, 7–5, 7–6^{(7–4)}, 6–2
Women's singles quarterfinals	(Russia) Maria Sharapova [2]	(Russia) Ekaterina Makarova [19]	6–2, 6–2
Men's singles quarterfinals	(Serbia) Novak Djokovic [1]	(Czech Republic) Tomáš Berdych [5]	6–1, 4–6, 6–1, 6–4
Mixed doubles Second Round	(Australia) Jarmila Gajdošová [WC] (Australia) Matthew Ebden [WC]	(Russia) Elena Vesnina [2] (India) Leander Paes [2]	6–3, 6–2
Matches on Margaret Court Arena
Event	Winner	Loser	Score
Women legends' doubles	(United States) Lindsay Davenport (France) Amélie Mauresmo	(Australia) Nicole Bradtke (Australia) Rennae Stubbs	4–6, 6–3, [10–6]
Men's doubles quarterfinals	(Spain) Marcel Granollers [3] (Spain) Marc López [3]	(Brazil) Thomaz Bellucci (France) Benoît Paire	6–3, 6–1
Women's doubles quarterfinals	(Italy) Sara Errani [1] (Italy) Roberta Vinci [1]	(United States) Serena Williams [12] (United States) Venus Williams [12]	3–6, 7–6^{(7–1)}, 7–5
Women's doubles quarterfinals	(Australia) Ashleigh Barty [WC] (Australia) Casey Dellacqua [WC]	(Russia) Anastasia Pavlyuchenkova (Czech Republic) Lucie Šafářová	6–2, 6–3
Men legends' doubles	(Australia) Wayne Arthurs (Australia) Pat Cash	(Croatia) Goran Ivanišević (France) Cédric Pioline	4–6, 7–6^{(10–8)}, [10–5]
Coloured background indicates a night match
Matches started at 11:00 am. Night matches did not start before 7:30 pm.

== Day 10 (23 January) ==
In the Men's Singles, The first match saw US Open champion Andy Murray took on the only unseeded quarterfinalist Jérémy Chardy in which the Brit came out comfortably 6–4, 6–1, 6–2 to advance to the semifinals. In the last quarterfinals of the tournament, second seed Roger Federer took on seventh seed Jo-Wilfried Tsonga in a tough match that went 5 sets and the two players trading sets, which saw Federer coming through.

In the Women's Singles, the play began with two slam champions Victoria Azarenka and Svetlana Kuznetsova taking on each other. Kuznetsova took a 4–1 lead in the first, but Azarenka took 12 of the last 14 games winning the match. In the other quarterfinal, it was an all-American clash between Serena Williams and Sloane Stephens, providing the upset of the tournament when Stephens defeated Williams.

- Day 10 attendance: 36,353
- Seeds out:
  - Men's Singles: (France) Jo-Wilfried Tsonga [7]
  - Women's Singles: (United States) Serena Williams [3]
  - Women's Doubles: (Russia) Ekaterina Makarova / (Russia) Elena Vesnina [4]
- Schedule of Play

Matches on main courts
Matches on Rod Laver Arena
Event	Winner	Loser	Score
Women's singles quarterfinals	(Belarus) Victoria Azarenka [1]	(Russia) Svetlana Kuznetsova	7–5, 6–1
Women's singles quarterfinals	(United States) Sloane Stephens [29]	(United States) Serena Williams [3]	3–6, 7–5, 6–4
Men's singles quarterfinals	(United Kingdom) Andy Murray [3]	(France) Jérémy Chardy	6–4, 6–1, 6–2
Men's singles quarterfinals	(Switzerland) Roger Federer [2]	(France) Jo-Wilfried Tsonga [7]	7–6^{(7–4)}, 4–6, 7–6^{(7–4)}, 3–6, 6–3
Women's doubles semifinals	(Australia) Ashleigh Barty [WC] (Australia) Casey Dellacqua [WC]	(United States) Varvara Lepchenko (China) Zheng Saisai	6–2, 6–4
Matches on Margaret Court Arena
Event	Winner	Loser	Score
Women legends' doubles	(Croatia) Iva Majoli (Austria) Barbara Schett	(United States) Lindsay Davenport (France) Amélie Mauresmo	6–3, 1–6, [10–5]
Men's doubles quarterfinals	(United States) Bob Bryan [1] (United States) Mike Bryan [1]	(Italy) Daniele Bracciali (Czech Republic) Lukáš Dlouhý	6–3, 7–5
Mixed doubles quarterfinals	(Czech Republic) Květa Peschke (Poland) Marcin Matkowski	(Chinese Taipei) Hsieh Su-wei (India) Rohan Bopanna	6–2, 6–3
Women's doubles semifinals	(Italy) Sara Errani [1] (Italy) Roberta Vinci [1]	(Russia) Ekaterina Makarova [4] (Russia) Elena Vesnina [4]	6–2, 6–4
Men legends' doubles	(Sweden) Thomas Enqvist (France) Fabrice Santoro	(Croatia) Goran Ivanišević (France) Cédric Pioline	1–6, 6–2, [10–8]
Coloured background indicates a night match
Matches started at 11:00 am. Night matches did not start before 7:30 pm.

== Day 11 (24 January) ==
In the Men's singles, 2-time defending champion Novak Djokovic took on 4th seed David Ferrer. Djokovic made quick work of defeating Ferrer. Djokovic made 30 winners to 16 unforced errors, while Ferrer made 11 winners to 32 unforced errors.

In the Women's singles, the first semifinal featured two of the most recent French Open champions 2012 winner Maria Sharapova and 2011 winner Li Na. Li came through comfortably winning to advance to her second Australian Open final. Li made 21 winners and 18 unforced errors to Sharapova's 17 winners and 32 unforced errors. In the second semifinals defending champion from Belarus Victoria Azarenka took on American Sloane Stephens. Azarenka came through also with ease winning in her sixth match point despite failing to convert five match points and to serve it out at 5–3.

- Day 11 attendance: 31,497
- Seeds out:
  - Men's Singles: (Spain) David Ferrer [4]
  - Women's Singles: (Russia) Maria Sharapova [2], (United States) Sloane Stephens [29]
  - Men's Doubles: (Spain) Marcel Granollers / (Spain) Marc López [3]
  - Mixed Doubles: (India) Sania Mirza / (United States) Bob Bryan [3], (Russia) Nadia Petrova / (India) Mahesh Bhupathi [5]
- Schedule of Play

Matches on main courts
Matches on Rod Laver Arena
Event	Winner	Loser	Score
Men's doubles semifinals	(United States) Bob Bryan [1] (United States) Mike Bryan [1]	(Italy) Simone Bolelli (Italy) Fabio Fognini	6–4, 4–6, 6–1
Women's singles semifinals	(China) Li Na [6]	(Russia) Maria Sharapova [2]	6–2, 6–2
Women's singles semifinals	(Belarus) Victoria Azarenka [1]	(United States) Sloane Stephens [29]	6–1, 6–4
Men's singles semifinals	(Serbia) Novak Djokovic [1]	(Spain) David Ferrer [4]	6–2, 6–2, 6–1
Men legends' doubles	(Australia) Pat Cash (Croatia) Goran Ivanišević	(France) Guy Forget (France) Henri Leconte	7–6^{(8–6)}, 2–6, [10–8]
Matches on Margaret Court Arena
Event	Winner	Loser	Score
Men legends' doubles	(Iran) Mansour Bahrami (South Africa) Wayne Ferreira	(Australia) Wayne Arthurs (Australia) Darren Cahill	6–2, 4–6, [10–8]
Men's doubles semifinals	(Netherlands) Robin Haase (Netherlands) Igor Sijsling	(Spain) Marcel Granollers [3] (Spain) Marc López [3]	7–5, 6–4
Mixed doubles quarterfinals	(Czech Republic) Lucie Hradecká (Czech Republic) František Čermák	(India) Sania Mirza [3] (United States) Bob Bryan [3]	7–5, 6–4
Mixed doubles quarterfinals	(Australia) Jarmila Gajdošová [WC] (Australia) Matthew Ebden [WC]	(Russia) Nadia Petrova [5] (India) Mahesh Bhupathi [5]	6–3, 3–6, [13–11]
Women legends' doubles	(Switzerland) Martina Hingis (United States) Martina Navratilova	(Australia) Nicole Bradtke (Australia) Rennae Stubbs	6–3, 7–6^{(7–0)}
Coloured background indicates a night match
Matches started at 11:00 am. Night matches did not start before 7:30 pm.

== Day 12 (25 January) ==
In the Men's Singles, it was Wimbledon champion Roger Federer taking on US Open champion Andy Murray. Murray took a two sets to one lead and served for the match at 6–5 in the fourth but Federer broke back and won the tie-break to take it to a fifth. Murray won the fifth set, defeating Federer for the first time in a slam.

In the Women's doubles, the no. 1 team of Italians Sara Errani and Roberta Vinci took on Australian wildcard Ashleigh Barty and Casey Dellacqua and won in three sets to win 3 of the last 4 slams.

- Day 12 attendance: 22,103
- Seeds out:
  - Men's Singles: (Switzerland) Roger Federer [2]
- Schedule of Play

Matches on main courts
Matches on Rod Laver Arena
Event	Winner	Loser	Score
Mixed doubles semifinals	(Australia) Jarmila Gajdošová [WC] (Australia) Matthew Ebden [WC]	(Kazakhstan) Yaroslava Shvedova (Uzbekistan) Denis Istomin	7–5, 7–6^{(7–5)}
Women's doubles final	(Italy) Sara Errani [1] (Italy) Roberta Vinci [1]	(Australia) Ashleigh Barty [WC] (Australia) Casey Dellacqua [WC]	6–2, 3–6, 6–2
Men's singles semifinals	(United Kingdom) Andy Murray [3]	(Switzerland) Roger Federer [2]	6–4, 6–7^{(5–7)}, 6–3, 6–7^{(2–7)}, 6–2
Matches on Margaret Court Arena
Event	Winner	Loser	Score
Boys' singles semifinals	(Australia) Nick Kyrgios [3]	(Italy) Filippo Baldi [8]	6–2, 6–1
Boys' singles semifinals	(Australia) Thanasi Kokkinakis [WC]	(Croatia) Borna Ćorić [11]	6–3, 6–2
Mixed doubles semifinals	(Czech Republic) Lucie Hradecká (Czech Republic) František Čermák	(Czech Republic) Květa Peschke (Poland) Marcin Matkowski	3–6, 7–5, [10–7]
Coloured background indicates a night match
Matches started at 3:00 pm. Night matches did not start before 7:30 pm.

== Day 13 (26 January) ==
Day 13 saw the finals of the Girls', Boys' and Women's singles as well as the Men's doubles.

Ana Konjuh, who had already won the Girls' Doubles with partner Belinda Bencic, defeated Kateřina Siniaková in straight sets to take the Girls' singles title. In doing so Konjuh took the No. 1 junior ranking.

Also in straight sets, Australian Nick Kyrgios defeated compatriot Thanasi Kokkinakis to take the Boys' Singles title having not lost a set all tournament. Scans the previous day had discovered a stress fracture in the left side of Kokkinakis' back, and his movement during the final was reported to be evidently hampered.

In the Women's final, due to her controversial medical time-out in her semifinal match, defending champion Victoria Azarenka's reception onto the Rod Laver Arena was much more subdued than that of her opponent Li Na. The opening set saw seven breaks of serve in total, with Li Na winning 6–4. During the second set, with Azarenka 3–1 up, Li twisted her left ankle and called the first of two 10-minute medical time-outs. Li was not able to undo her opponent's advantage, Azerenka won the set 6–4 to level the match. The match was also interrupted at the beginning of the third set due to Australia Day fireworks. Li rolled her left ankle once again on the first point after play resumed, this time also heavily knocking the rear of her head on the court, thus incurring another 10-minute medical time-out. Azarenka broke in the fifth game and maintained the advantage to take the set 6–3 and win the match two sets to one.

The victory was Azarenka's second Australian Open title. In post-match interviews she declared that "This one is way more emotional".

Top seeds Bob and Mike Bryan defeated Robin Haase and Igor Sijsling to claim their 6th Men's Doubles Australian Open title and their 13th Grand Slam, surpassing John Newcombe and Tony Roche's record for the most doubles majors. Though Haase and Sijsling broke the serve in the opening game, the match was won by the Bryans in straight sets.

- Day 13 attendance: 20,036
- Seeds out:
  - Women's Singles: (China) Li Na [6]
- Schedule of Play

Matches on main courts
Matches on Rod Laver Arena
Event	Winner	Loser	Score
Girls' singles final	(Croatia) Ana Konjuh [3]	(Czech Republic) Kateřina Siniaková [2]	6–3, 6–4
Boys' singles final	(Australia) Nick Kyrgios [3]	(Australia) Thanasi Kokkinakis [WC]	7–6^{(7–4)}, 6–3
Women's singles final	(Belarus) Victoria Azarenka [1]	(China) Li Na [6]	4–6, 6–4, 6–3
Men's doubles final	(United States) Bob Bryan [1] (United States) Mike Bryan [1]	(Netherlands) Robin Haase (Netherlands) Igor Sijsling	6–3, 6–4
Coloured background indicates a night match
Matches started at 12:30 pm. Night matches did not start before 7:30 pm.

== Day 14 (27 January) ==
In the Mixed doubles final, Australian wildcard entries Jarmila Gajdošová and Matthew Ebden defeated the Czech pair of Lucie Hradecká and František Čermák in straight sets. Two breaks of the Hradecká serve gave the Australians the first set. In the second set Gajdošová and Ebden were a break up, but the Hradecká and Čermák managed to break back. The advantage was recovered in the 11th game, and the Australians won the second set 7–5 after a long return from Cermak.

Defending Champion Novak Djokovic defeated Andy Murray in four sets to take his third consecutive Australian Open title, being the first man in the Open Era to do so. Murray and Djokovic took the first and second sets respectively, both on tiebreaks. The first break of serve came when Djokovic took the eighth game of the third set. In post-match interviews Djokovic stated he tried to be more aggressive in the third and fourth sets, coming to the net more often. The match was Djokovic's 21st successive victory at the Australian Open.

Though Murray received treatment for a blister after the first set, he insisted it had no impact on the result. After the match, Djokovic was quoted as saying "I'm full of joy right now. It's going to give me a lot of confidence for the rest of the season."

- Day 14 attendance: 25,061
- Seeds out:
  - Men's Singles: (United Kingdom) Andy Murray [3]
- Schedule of Play

Matches on main courts
Matches on Rod Laver Arena
Event	Winner	Loser	Score
Mixed doubles final	(Australia) Jarmila Gajdošová [WC] (Australia) Matthew Ebden [WC]	(Czech Republic) Lucie Hradecká (Czech Republic) František Čermák	6–3, 7–5
Men's singles final	(Serbia) Novak Djokovic [1]	(United Kingdom) Andy Murray [3]	6–7^{(2–7)}, 7–6^{(7–3)}, 6–3, 6–2
Coloured background indicates a night match
Matches started at 4:00 pm. Night matches did not start before 7:30 pm.
