= 2013 Australian Open – Wheelchair men's singles =

Wheelchair men's singles
- 2013 Australian Open

Final
- Champions: (Japan) Shingo Kunieda
- Runners-up: (France) Stéphane Houdet
- Score: 6–2, 6–0

Events
Singles	men	women		boys	girls
Doubles	men	women	mixed	boys	girls
WC Singles	men	women	quad
WC Doubles	men	women	quad
Legends	men	women	mixed
- Australian Open

Shingo Kunieda defeated Stéphane Houdet in the final, 6–2, 6–0 to win the men's singles wheelchair tennis title at the 2013 Australian Open. It was his sixth Australian Open singles title and 14th major singles title overall.

Maikel Scheffers was the defending champion, but was defeated by Kunieda in the quarterfinals.

The 2013 Australian Open Wheelchair men's singles (also known as the Optius Australian Open Wheelchair men's singles for sponsorship reasons) draw, featured eight players with two seeds and a wildcard. All matches were played as best-of-three-sets.

== Draw ==
Key

- Q = Qualifier
- WC = Wild card
- LL = Lucky loser
- Alt = Alternate
- ITF = ITF entry
- PR = Protected ranking
- SR = Special ranking
- SE = Special exempt
- JE = Junior exempt
- JR = Junior Accelerator Programme entrant
- CO = College Accelerator Programme entrant
- NG = Next Gen Accelerator Program entrant
- w/o = Walkover
- r = Retired
- d = Defaulted

Quarterfinals
1	(France) Stéphane Houdet	7	7^{7}
(France) Michaël Jérémiasz	5	6^{4}
(Netherlands) Ronald Vink	6	6
(Argentina) Gustavo Fernández	4	1
WC	(Australia) Adam Kellerman	4	3
(Sweden) Stefan Olsson	6	6
(Netherlands) Maikel Scheffers	7^{7}	1	3
2	(Japan) Shingo Kunieda	6^{5}	6	6

Semifinals
1	(France) Stéphane Houdet	6	3	6
(Netherlands) Ronald Vink	1	6	3
(Sweden) Stefan Olsson	0	2
2	(Japan) Shingo Kunieda	6	6

Final
1	(France) Stéphane Houdet	2	0
2	(Japan) Shingo Kunieda	6	6
