= 2014 Australian Open – Wheelchair men's doubles =

Wheelchair men's doubles
- 2014 Australian Open

Final
- Champions: (France) Stéphane Houdet (Japan) Shingo Kunieda
- Runners-up: (United Kingdom) Gordon Reid (Netherlands) Maikel Scheffers
- Score: 6–3, 6–3

Events
Singles	men	women		boys	girls
Doubles	men	women	mixed	boys	girls
WC Singles	men	women	quad
WC Doubles	men	women	quad
Legends	men	women	mixed
← 2013 ·	Australian Open	· 2015 →

Defending champion Shingo Kunieda and his partner Stéphane Houdet defeated Gordon Reid and Maikel Scheffers in the final, 6–3, 6–3 to win the men's doubles wheelchair tennis title at the 2014 Australian Open. It was Houdet's first step towards a Grand Slam.

Michaël Jérémiasz and Kunieda were the defending champions, but did not compete together. Jérémiasz partnered Gustavo Fernández, but was defeated by Reid and Scheffers in the semifinals.

== Seeds ==
1. (France) Stéphane Houdet / (Japan) Shingo Kunieda (champions)
2. (United Kingdom) Gordon Reid / (Netherlands) Maikel Scheffers (final)

== Draw ==
=== Key ===
- Q = Qualifier
- WC = Wild card
- LL = Lucky loser
- Alt = Alternate
- ITF = ITF entry
- PR = Protected ranking
- SR = Special ranking
- SE = Special exempt
- JE = Junior exempt
- JR = Junior Accelerator Programme entrant
- CO = College Accelerator Programme entrant
- NG = Next Gen Accelerator Program entrant
- w/o = Walkover
- r = Retired
- d = Defaulted

=== Finals ===
Semifinals
1	(France) Stéphane Houdet (Japan) Shingo Kunieda	6	6
(Belgium) Joachim Gérard (Australia) Adam Kellerman	1	4
(Argentina) Gustavo Fernández (France) Michaël Jérémiasz	2	5
2	(United Kingdom) Gordon Reid (Netherlands) Maikel Scheffers	6	7

Final
1	(France) Stéphane Houdet (Japan) Shingo Kunieda	6	6
2	(United Kingdom) Gordon Reid (Netherlands) Maikel Scheffers	3	3
