= 2014 Australian Open – Wheelchair men's singles =

Wheelchair men's singles
- 2014 Australian Open

Final
- Champion: (Japan) Shingo Kunieda
- Runner-up: (Argentina) Gustavo Fernández
- Score: 6–0, 6–1

Events
| Singles | men | women | | boys | girls |
| Doubles | men | women | mixed | boys | girls |
| WC Singles | men | women | quad |
| WC Doubles | men | women | quad |
| Legends | men | women | mixed |
- Australian Open

Defending champion Shingo Kunieda defeated Gustavo Fernández in the final, 6–0, 6–1 to win the men's singles wheelchair tennis title at the 2014 Australian Open. It was his seventh Australian Open singles title and 15th major singles title overall.

== Seeds ==
1. (Japan) Shingo Kunieda (champion)
2. (France) Stéphane Houdet (semifinals)

== Draw ==
Key

- Q = Qualifier
- WC = Wild card
- LL = Lucky loser
- Alt = Alternate
- ITF = ITF entry
- PR = Protected ranking
- SR = Special ranking
- SE = Special exempt
- JE = Junior exempt
- JR = Junior Accelerator Programme entrant
- CO = College Accelerator Programme entrant
- NG = Next Gen Accelerator Program entrant
- w/o = Walkover
- r = Retired
- d = Defaulted

Quarterfinals
1 | (Japan) Shingo Kunieda | 7 | 6
(United Kingdom) Gordon Reid | 5 | 2
(Netherlands) Maikel Scheffers | 7 | 7
WC | (Australia) Adam Kellerman | 5 | 5
(France) Michaël Jérémiasz | 4 | 1
(Argentina) Gustavo Fernández | 6 | 6
(Belgium) Joachim Gérard | 6 | 2 | 2
2 | (France) Stéphane Houdet | 4 | 6 | 6

Semifinals
1 | (Japan) Shingo Kunieda | 6 | 6
(Netherlands) Maikel Scheffers | 0 | 0
(Argentina) Gustavo Fernández | 6 | 7^{7}
2 | (France) Stéphane Houdet | 1 | 6^{4}

Final
1 | (Japan) Shingo Kunieda | 6 | 6
(Argentina) Gustavo Fernández | 0 | 1
