= 2013 Australian Open – Wheelchair men's doubles =

Wheelchair men's doubles
- 2013 Australian Open

Final
- Champions: (France) Michaël Jérémiasz (Japan) Shingo Kunieda
- Runners-up: (Sweden) Stefan Olsson (Australia) Adam Kellerman
- Score: 6–0, 6–1

Events
Singles	men	women		boys	girls
Doubles	men	women	mixed	boys	girls
WC Singles	men	women	quad
WC Doubles	men	women	quad
Legends	men	women	mixed
← 2012 ·	Australian Open	· 2014 →

Michaël Jérémiasz and Shingo Kunieda defeated Stefan Olsson and Adam Kellerman in the final, 6–0, 6–1 to win the men's doubles wheelchair tennis title at the 2013 Australian Open. With the win, Jérémaisz completed the career Super Slam.

Robin Ammerlaan and Ronald Vink were the reigning champions, but Ammerlaan did not participate. Vink partnered Stéphane Houdet, but was defeated by Olsson and Kellerman in the semifinals.

The 2013 Australian Open – Wheelchair men's doubles was a tennis tournament featuring 8 paraplegic men tennis players, which was part of the NEC Tour. The tournament took place at Melbourne Park in Melbourne, Australia, from 25 January to 28 January 2012. It was the 10th edition of the Australian Open men's wheelchair event and the first Grand Slam event of 2013. The tournament was played on Plexicushion Prestige AO hard courts, which was rated a medium-fast pace by the ITF. The competition was organised by the International Tennis Federation and Tennis Australia.

== Seeds ==
1. (France) Stéphane Houdet / (Netherlands) Ronald Vink (semifinals)
2. (France) Michaël Jérémiasz / (Japan) Shingo Kunieda (champions)

== Draw ==
=== Key ===
- Q = Qualifier
- WC = Wild card
- LL = Lucky loser
- Alt = Alternate
- ITF = ITF entry
- PR = Protected ranking
- SR = Special ranking
- SE = Special exempt
- JE = Junior exempt
- JR = Junior Accelerator Programme entrant
- CO = College Accelerator Programme entrant
- NG = Next Gen Accelerator Program entrant
- w/o = Walkover
- r = Retired
- d = Defaulted

=== Finals ===
Semifinals
1	(France) Stéphane Houdet (Netherlands) Ronald Vink	4	6^{6}
(Sweden) Stefan Olsson (Australia) Adam Kellerman	6	7^{8}
(Netherlands) Maikel Scheffers (Argentina) Gustavo Fernández	3	2
2	(France) Michaël Jérémiasz (Japan) Shingo Kunieda	6	6

Final
(Sweden) Stefan Olsson (Australia) Adam Kellerman	0	1
2	(France) Michaël Jérémiasz (Japan) Shingo Kunieda	6	6
