= Yeung Pak-long =

Hong Kong tennis player (born 1995)

- Country (sports): Hong Kong
- Residence: Hong Kong
- Born: 14 February 1995 (age 31) Hong Kong
- Plays: Right-handed (two-handed backhand)
- College: Harvard University
- Prize money: $22,104

Singles
- Career record: 67–84
- Career titles: 0
- Highest ranking: No. 940 (24 August 2020)

Grand Slam singles results
- Australian Open Junior: 2R (2013)

Doubles
- Career record: 93–73
- Career titles: 5 ITF
- Highest ranking: No. 394 (6 August 2018)

Grand Slam doubles results
- Australian Open Junior: QF (2013)

Team competitions
- Davis Cup: 2–4

Yeung Pak-long (Chinese: 楊柏朗; born 14 February 1995; also known as Brian Yeung) is a Hong Kong tennis player.

Yeung has a career high ATP singles ranking of No. 940 achieved on 24 August 2020 and a career high ATP doubles ranking of No. 394 achieved on 6 August 2018.

Yeung has represented Hong Kong at the Davis Cup, where he has a win–loss record of 2–4.
