= 2013 Australian Open – Boys' doubles =

Boys' doubles
- 2013 Australian Open

Final
- Champions: (Australia) Jay Andrijic (Australia) Bradley Mousley
- Runners-up: (Germany) Maximilian Marterer (Austria) Lucas Miedler
- Score: 6–3, 7–6^{(7–3)}

Events
Singles	men	women		boys	girls
Doubles	men	women	mixed	boys	girls
WC Singles	men	women	quad
WC Doubles	men	women	quad
Legends	men	women	mixed
- Australian Open

Liam Broady and Joshua Ward-Hibbert won the event in 2012.
Jay Andrijic and Bradley Mousley won this year's edition 6–3, 7–6^{(7–3)} against Maximilian Marterer and Lucas Miedler.

== Seeds ==
1. (Croatia) Borna Ćorić / (Serbia) Laslo Djere (second round)
2. (United States) Thai-Son Kwiatkowski / (Sweden) Elias Ymer (second round)
3. (Italy) Filippo Baldi / (Czech Republic) Robin Staněk (second round)
4. (France) Quentin Halys / (Serbia) Nikola Milojević (first round, withdrew)
5. (Canada) Hugo Di Feo / (Canada) Brayden Schnur (second round)
6. (South Africa) Wayne Montgomery / (United States) Martin Redlicki (first round)
7. (United States) Mackenzie McDonald / (Egypt) Mazen Osama (second round)
8. (Japan) Naoki Nakagawa / (Japan) Yoshihito Nishioka (first round)

== Draw ==
Key

- Q = Qualifier
- WC = Wild card
- LL = Lucky loser
- Alt = Alternate
- ITF = ITF entry
- PR = Protected ranking
- SR = Special ranking
- SE = Special exempt
- JE = Junior exempt
- JR = Junior Accelerator Programme entrant
- CO = College Accelerator Programme entrant
- NG = Next Gen Accelerator Program entrant
- w/o = Walkover
- r = Retired
- d = Defaulted

=== Finals ===
Semifinals
(South Korea) Chung Hyeon (South Korea) Kim Duk-young	3	2
(Germany) Maximilian Marterer (Austria) Lucas Miedler	6	6
(France) Enzo Couacaud (Italy) Stefano Napolitano	6	4	[4]
(Australia) Jay Andrijic (Australia) Bradley Mousley	4	6	[10]

Final
(Germany) Maximilian Marterer (Austria) Lucas Miedler	3	6^{3}
(Australia) Jay Andrijic (Australia) Bradley Mousley	6	7^{7}

=== Top half ===
First round
1	(Croatia) Borna Ćorić (Serbia) Laslo Djere	6	0	[10]
(Serbia) Luka Ilić (Turkey) Cem İlkel	4	6	[7]
(Chile) Cristian Garín (Chile) Nicolás Jarry	5	7	[7]
(Russia) Karen Khachanov (Croatia) Franko Miočić	7	5	[10]
(South Korea) Chung Hyeon (South Korea) Kim Duk-young	6	6
(Australia) Marc Polmans (Australia) Akira Santillan	2	3
(Sweden) Gustav Hansson (Japan) Takashi Saito	6	4	[10]
8	(Japan) Naoki Nakagawa (Japan) Yoshihito Nishioka	4	6	[4]
4	(France) Quentin Halys (Serbia) Nikola Milojević
(Germany) Maximilian Marterer (Austria) Lucas Miedler	w/o
(Cyprus) Petros Chrysochos (Cyprus) Sergis Kyratzis	6^{6}	5
(Australia) Omar Jasika (Australia) Blake Mott	7^{8}	7
(China) Liu Siyu (China) Zheng Weiqiang	4	6	[8]
(Philippines) Jurence Mendoza (Hong Kong) Yeung Pak-long	6	4	[10]
(Germany) Adrian Obert (Germany) Paul Wörner	6	1	[6]
7	(United States) Mackenzie McDonald (Egypt) Mazen Osama	2	6	[10]

Second round
1	(Croatia) B Ćorić (Serbia) L Djere	6	3	[7]
(Russia) K Khachanov (Croatia) F Miočić	2	6	[10]
(South Korea) H Chung (South Korea) D-y Kim	7^{7}	6
(Sweden) G Hansson (Japan) T Saito	6^{4}	3
(Germany) M Marterer (Austria) L Miedler	6	6
(Australia) O Jasika (Australia) B Mott	4	4
(Philippines) J-Z Mendoza (Hong Kong) P-l Yeung	7^{7}	1	[10]
7	(United States) M McDonald (Egypt) M Osama	6^{4}	6	[6]

Quarterfinals
(Russia) K Khachanov (Croatia) F Miočić	6^{3}	5
(South Korea) H Chung (South Korea) D-Y Kim	7^{7}	7
(Germany) M Marterer (Austria) L Miedler	7^{7}	6
(Philippines) J-Z Mendoza (Hong Kong) P-l Yeung	6^{3}	2

Semifinals
(South Korea) H Chung (South Korea) D-y Kim	3	2
(Germany) M Marterer (Austria) L Miedler	6	6

=== Bottom half ===
First round
6	(South Africa) Wayne Montgomery (United States) Martin Redlicki	5	3
(Australia) Jacob Grills (Australia) Daniel Guccione	7	6
(France) Enzo Couacaud (Italy) Stefano Napolitano	6	6
(Australia) Harry Bourchier (New Zealand) Cameron Norrie	3	2
(Russia) Anton Desyatnik (Russia) Fedor Andrienko	1	1
(Australia) Thanasi Kokkinakis (Australia) Nick Kyrgios	6	6
(South Korea) Kang Ku-keon (South Korea) Lee Duck-hee	3	1
3	(Italy) Filippo Baldi (Czech Republic) Robin Staněk	6	6
5	(Canada) Hugo Di Feo (Canada) Brayden Schnur	6	7^{7}
(Russia) Alexandr Spirin (Germany) Alexander Zverev	3	6^{4}
(Germany) Hannes Wagner (Austria) Dominic Weidinger	5	3
(Australia) Jay Andrijic (Australia) Bradley Mousley	7	6
(South Korea) Hong Seong-chan (South Korea) Kim Young-seok	6	6
(France) Maxime Hamou (France) Johan Sébastien Tatlot	2	3
(Slovakia) Matej Maruščák (Slovakia) Jakub Oravec	4	3
2	(United States) Thai-Son Kwiatkowski (Sweden) Elias Ymer	6	6

Second round
(Australia) J Grills (Australia) D Guccione	3	4
(France) E Couacaud (Italy) S Napolitano	6	6
(Australia) T Kokkinakis (Australia) N Kyrgios	6	6
3	(Italy) F Baldi (Czech Republic) R Staněk	3	1
5	(Canada) H Di Feo (Canada) B Schnur	3	5
(Australia) J Andrijic (Australia) B Mousley	6	7
(South Korea) S-c Hong (South Korea) Y-s Kim	3	7	[10]
2	(United States) T-S Kwiatkowski (Sweden) E Ymer	6	5	[5]

Quarterfinals
(France) E Couacaud (Italy) S Napolitano	6	6
(Australia) T Kokkinakis (Australia) N Kyrgios	2	4
(Australia) J Andrijic (Australia) B Mousley	7^{7}	6
(South Korea) S-c Hong (South Korea) Y-s Kim	6^{4}	4

Semifinals
(France) E Couacaud (Italy) S Napolitano	6	4	[4]
(Australia) J Andrijic (Australia) B Mousley	4	6	[10]
