= 2014 Australian Open – Boys' singles =

Boys' singles
- 2014 Australian Open

Final
- Champion: (Germany) Alexander Zverev
- Runner-up: (United States) Stefan Kozlov
- Score: 6–3, 6–0

Events
Singles	men	women		boys	girls
Doubles	men	women	mixed	boys	girls
WC Singles	men	women	quad
WC Doubles	men	women	quad
Legends	men	women	mixed
- Australian Open

Alexander Zverev defeated Stefan Kozlov in the final, 6–3, 6–0 to win the boys' singles tennis title at the 2014 Australian Open.

Nick Kyrgios was the defending champion, but he received a wildcard into the men's singles main draw and was lost to Benoît Paire in the second round.

== Seeds ==
1. (Germany) Alexander Zverev (champion)
2. (United States) Stefan Kozlov (final)
3. (France) Johan-Sébastien Tatlot (first round)
4. (Russia) Roman Safiullin (first round)
5. (United States) Michael Mmoh (second round)
6. (Italy) Filippo Baldi (first round)
7. (France) Quentin Halys (semifinals)
8. (Russia) Daniil Medvedev (third round)
9. (Poland) Kamil Majchrzak (Quarterfinal)
10. (Russia) Andrey Rublev (Quarterfinal)
11. (South Korea) Chung Hyeon (Quarterfinal)
12. (South Korea) Lee Duck-hee (third round)
13. (Austria) Lucas Miedler (second round)
14. (Japan) Jumpei Yamasaki (second round)
15. (Brazil) Marcelo Zormann (third round)
16. (Japan) Naoki Nakagawa (second round)

== Draw ==
Key

- Q = Qualifier
- WC = Wild card
- LL = Lucky loser
- Alt = Alternate
- ITF = ITF entry
- PR = Protected ranking
- SR = Special ranking
- SE = Special exempt
- JE = Junior exempt
- JR = Junior Accelerator Programme entrant
- CO = College Accelerator Programme entrant
- NG = Next Gen Accelerator Program entrant
- w/o = Walkover
- r = Retired
- d = Defaulted

=== Finals ===
Quarterfinals
1	(Germany) Alexander Zverev	6	6
11	(South Korea) Chung Hyeon	2	4
(Australia) Bradley Mousley	6	6
9	(Poland) Kamil Majchrzak	3	4
7	(France) Quentin Halys	6	6
(Cyprus) Petros Chrysochos	3	4
10	(Russia) Andrey Rublev	2	1
2	(United States) Stefan Kozlov	6	6

Semifinals
1	(Germany) Alexander Zverev	6	1	6
(Australia) Bradley Mousley	4	6	1
7	(France) Quentin Halys	6	6^{3}	3
2	(United States) Stefan Kozlov	2	7^{7}	6

Final
1	(Germany) Alexander Zverev	6	6
2	(United States) Stefan Kozlov	3	0

=== Top half ===
==== Section 1 ====
First round
1	(Germany) Alexander Zverev	6	6
(Croatia) Nino Serdarušić	3	4
Q	(Italy) Jacopo Stefanini	2	7	3
Q	(Japan) Ryotaro Matsumura	6	5	6
Q	(Russia) Ilya Vasiliyev	6^{2}	6	6
WC	(Australia) Brian Tran	7^{7}	4	2
(South Korea) Chung Yun-seong	3	3
15	(Brazil) Marcelo Zormann	6	6
11	(South Korea) Chung Hyeon	6	6
Q	(New Zealand) William Matheson	2	1
(Japan) Ken Onishi	2	7	2
(Australia) Akira Santillan	6	5	6
WC	(China) Sun Fajing	6	6
Q	(Switzerland) Marko Osmakcic	3	3
WC	(Australia) Daniel Nolan	2	2
8	(Russia) Daniil Medvedev	6	6

Second round
1	(Germany) A Zverev	4	6	9
Q	(Japan) R Matsumura	6	2	7
Q	(Russia) I Vasiliyev	7^{7}	3	4
15	(Brazil) M Zormann	6^{5}	6	6
11	(South Korea) H Chung	6	6
(Australia) A Santillan	1	2
WC	(China) F Sun	4	0
8	(Russia) D Medvedev	6	6

Third round
1	(Germany) A Zverev	6	6
15	(Brazil) M Zormann	2	3
11	(South Korea) H Chung	6	3	6
8	(Russia) D Medvedev	3	6	1

Quarterfinal
1	(Germany) A Zverev	6	6
11	(South Korea) H Chung	2	4

==== Section 2 ====
First round
3	(France) Johan-Sébastien Tatlot	4	6	4
(Slovakia) Martin Blaško	6	0	6
(China) Qiu Zhuoyang	2	4
(Russia) Artur Shakhnubaryan	6	6
(Australia) Bradley Mousley	6	6
(South Korea) Kang Ku-keon	3	0
Q	(Italy) Mirko Cutuli	1	0
16	(Japan) Naoki Nakagawa	6	6
9	(Poland) Kamil Majchrzak	3	7	6
SE	(Australia) Daniel Guccione	6	5	2
Q	(Italy) Matteo Berrettini	6^{4}	6	6
(Belgium) Clément Geens	7^{7}	2	3
(Spain) Pedro Martínez	6	6^{4}	5
(Australia) Marc Polmans	2	7^{7}	7
(Sweden) Daniel Windahl	4	4
5	(United States) Michael Mmoh	6	6

Second round
(Slovakia) M Blaško	7^{7}	3	2
(Russia) A Shakhnubaryan	6^{5}	6	6
(Australia) B Mousley	5	7^{7}	6
16	(Japan) N Nakagawa	7	6^{5}	4
9	(Poland) K Majchrzak	3	6	6
Q	(Italy) M Berrettini	6	4	4
(Australia) M Polmans	6	7
5	(United States) M Mmoh	3	5

Third round
(Russia) A Shakhnubaryan	1	5
(Australia) B Mousley	6	7
9	(Poland) K Majchrzak	6	6
(Australia) M Polmans	3	3

Quarterfinal
(Australia) B Mousley	6	6
9	(Poland) K Majchrzak	3	4

=== Bottom half ===
==== Section 3 ====
First round
7	(France) Quentin Halys	6	6
(Germany) Johannes Härteis	4	2
WC	(Australia) Oliver Anderson	6	6
(Brazil) Rafael Matos	4	3
Q	(Italy) Andrea Pellegrino	5	6	6
(Japan) Sora Fukuda	7	1	3
WC	(Australia) Mitchell Harper	3	2
12	(South Korea) Lee Duck-hee	6	6
13	(Austria) Lucas Miedler	6	6
(Japan) Makoto Ochi	2	2
(China) Zheng Weiqiang	3	2
(Australia) Omar Jasika	6	6
(Cyprus) Petros Chrysochos	7	7^{7}
(South Korea) Oh Chan-yeong	5	6^{3}
(Slovakia) Alex Molčan	3	7^{7}	6
4	(Russia) Roman Safiullin	6	6^{2}	4

Second round
7	(France) Q Halys	7	6
WC	(Australia) O Anderson	5	1
Q	(Italy) A Pellegrino	1	6	1
12	(South Korea) D-h Lee	6	3	6
13	(Austria) L Miedler	1	4
(Australia) O Jasika	6	6
(Cyprus) P Chrysochos	6^{3}	7^{7}	6
(Slovakia) A Molčan	7^{7}	6^{2}	2

Third round
7	(France) Q Halys	7^{7}	6
12	(South Korea) D-h Lee	6^{5}	2
(Australia) O Jasika	6^{6}	3
(Cyprus) P Chrysochos	7^{8}	6

Quarterfinal
7	(France) Q Halys	6	6
(Cyprus) P Chrysochos	3	4

==== Section 4 ====
First round
6	(Italy) Filippo Baldi	6^{2}	6^{9}
(Spain) Jaume Munar	7^{7}	7^{11}
(India) Sumit Nagal	3	3
(Australia) Harry Bourchier	6	6
(Japan) Yusuke Takahashi	3	4
(South Korea) Hong Seong-chan	6	6
WC	(Australia) Jake Delaney	3	2
10	(Russia) Andrey Rublev	6	6
14	(Japan) Jumpei Yamasaki	6	6
(Brazil) Gabriel Vellinho Hocevar	1	3
WC	(Australia) Max Purcell	6	4	2
(Russia) Boris Pokotilov	3	6	6
(New Zealand) Alexander Klintcharov	4	3
(Denmark) Simon Friis Søndergaard	6	6
WC	(Australia) Blake Mott	6^{5}	6	5^{r}
2	(United States) Stefan Kozlov	7^{7}	4	6

Second round
(Spain) J Munar	3	4
(Australia) H Bourchier	6	6
(South Korea) S-c Hong	6	2	4
10	(Russia) A Rublev	4	6	6
14	(Japan) J Yamasaki	4	6	6
(Russia) B Pokotilov	6	4	8
(Denmark) SF Søndergaard	7^{10}	5	0
2	(United States) S Kozlov	6^{8}	7	6

Third round
(Australia) H Bourchier	5	7^{9}	12
10	(Russia) A Rublev	7	6^{7}	14
(Russia) B Pokotilov	1	2
2	(United States) S Kozlov	6	6

Quarterfinal
10	(Russia) A Rublev	2	1
2	(United States) S Kozlov	6	6
