= 2014 Australian Open – Wheelchair women's singles =

Wheelchair women's singles
- 2014 Australian Open

Final
- Champion: (Germany) Sabine Ellerbrock
- Runner-up: (Japan) Yui Kamiji
- Score: 3–6, 6–4, 6–2

Events
Singles	men	women		boys	girls
Doubles	men	women	mixed	boys	girls
WC Singles	men	women	quad
WC Doubles	men	women	quad
Legends	men	women	mixed
← 2013 ·	Australian Open	· 2015 →

Sabine Ellerbrock defeated Yui Kamiji in the final, 3–6, 6–4, 6–2 to win the women's singles wheelchair tennis title at the 2014 Australian Open.

Aniek van Koot was the reigning champion, but did not participate due to tendinitis.

== Seeds ==
1. (Germany) Sabine Ellerbrock (champion)
2. (Japan) Yui Kamiji (final)

== Draw ==
=== Key ===
- Q = Qualifier
- WC = Wild card
- LL = Lucky loser
- Alt = Alternate
- ITF = ITF entry
- PR = Protected ranking
- SR = Special ranking
- SE = Special exempt
- JE = Junior exempt
- JR = Junior Accelerator Programme entrant
- CO = College Accelerator Programme entrant
- NG = Next Gen Accelerator Program entrant
- w/o = Walkover
- r = Retired
- d = Defaulted

Quarterfinals
1	(Germany) Sabine Ellerbrock	6	6
(South Africa) Kgothatso Montjane	1	3
(Netherlands) Sharon Walraven	3	3
(United Kingdom) Jordanne Whiley	6	6
(Netherlands) Jiske Griffioen	6	6
(United Kingdom) Lucy Shuker	1	2
(Netherlands) Marjolein Buis	1	4
2	(Japan) Yui Kamiji	6	6

Semifinals
1	(Germany) Sabine Ellerbrock	6	6
(United Kingdom) Jordanne Whiley	1	1
(Netherlands) Jiske Griffioen	3	6	4
2	(Japan) Yui Kamiji	6	0	6

Final
1	(Germany) Sabine Ellerbrock	3	6	6
2	(Japan) Yui Kamiji	6	4	2
