= 2014 Australian Open – Girls' doubles =

Girls' doubles
- 2014 Australian Open

Final
- Champions: (Ukraine) Anhelina Kalinina (Russia) Elizaveta Kulichkova
- Runners-up: (United Kingdom) Katie Boulter (Serbia) Ivana Jorović
- Score: 6–4, 6–2

Events
Singles	men	women		boys	girls
Doubles	men	women	mixed	boys	girls
WC Singles	men	women	quad
WC Doubles	men	women	quad
Legends	men	women	mixed
- Australian Open

Ana Konjuh and Carol Zhao were the defending champions, but both players chose not to compete in 2014.

Anhelina Kalinina and Elizaveta Kulichkova won the tournament, defeating Katie Boulter and Ivana Jorović in the final, 6–4, 6–2.

== Seeds ==
1. (Ukraine) Anhelina Kalinina / (Russia) Elizaveta Kulichkova (champions)
2. (United Kingdom) Katie Boulter / (Serbia) Ivana Jorović (final)
3. (China) Xu Shilin / (China) You Xiaodi (second round)
4. (Russia) Anastasiya Komardina / (Serbia) Nina Stojanović (semifinals)
5. (Hungary) Fanny Stollár / (United Kingdom) Isabelle Wallace (quarterfinals)
6. (Thailand) Kamonwan Buayam / (Australia) Sara Tomic (second round)
7. (United States) Michaela Gordon / (United States) Katrine Steffensen (second round)
8. (Australia) Priscilla Hon / (Switzerland) Jil Belen Teichmann (quarterfinals)

== Draw ==
Key

- Q = Qualifier
- WC = Wild card
- LL = Lucky loser
- Alt = Alternate
- ITF = ITF entry
- PR = Protected ranking
- SR = Special ranking
- SE = Special exempt
- JE = Junior exempt
- JR = Junior Accelerator Programme entrant
- CO = College Accelerator Programme entrant
- NG = Next Gen Accelerator Program entrant
- w/o = Walkover
- r = Retired
- d = Defaulted

=== Finals ===
Semifinals
1	(Ukraine) Anhelina Kalinina (Russia) Elizaveta Kulichkova	7	7^{7}
4	(Russia) Anastasiya Komardina (Serbia) Nina Stojanović	5	6^{3}
(Australia) Naiktha Bains (Australia) Olivia Tjandramulia	4	6	[5]
2	(United Kingdom) Katie Boulter (Serbia) Ivana Jorović	6	3	[10]

Final
1	(Ukraine) Anhelina Kalinina (Russia) Elizaveta Kulichkova	6	6
2	(United Kingdom) Katie Boulter (Serbia) Ivana Jorović	4	2

=== Top half ===
First round
1	(Ukraine) Anhelina Kalinina (Russia) Elizaveta Kulichkova	6	6
WC	(Australia) Kimberly Birrell (Australia) Anja Dokic	1	4
(Japan) Nozomi Ohya (Japan) Yukina Saigo	2	7^{7}	[5]
(India) Snehadevi Reddy (India) Dhruthi Tatachar Venugopal	6	6^{4}	[10]
(United Kingdom) Freya Christie (Latvia) Jeļena Ostapenko	6	6
(Australia) Danielle McIntyre (Australia) Michelle Pits	2	2
(Italy) Georgia Brescia (Austria) Julia Grabher	0	1
6	(Thailand) Kamonwan Buayam (Australia) Sara Tomic	6	6
4	(Russia) Anastasiya Komardina (Serbia) Nina Stojanović	6	6
(Australia) Destanee Aiava (Australia) Seone Mendez	2	4
(China) Cao Siqi (China) Zheng Wushuang	6	6
WC	(Australia) Annabelle Adrinopoulos (Australia) Katerina Valos	3	4
(Croatia) Jana Fett (France) Margot Yerolymos	6	6
(Japan) Shiori Fukuda (Brazil) Leticia Vidal	1	4
(Australia) Andrea Dikosavljevic (Australia) Lyann Hoang	5	4
5	(Hungary) Fanny Stollár (United Kingdom) Isabelle Wallace	7	6

Second round
1	(Ukraine) A Kalinina (Russia) E Kulichkova	6	6
(India) S Reddy (India) D Tatachar Venugopal	1	2
(United Kingdom) F Christie (Latvia) J Ostapenko	6	6
6	(Thailand) K Buayam (Australia) S Tomic	4	2
4	(Russia) A Komardina (Serbia) N Stojanović	6	4	[10]
(China) S Cao (China) W Zheng	2	6	[7]
(Croatia) J Fett (France) M Yerolymos	6	3	[10]
5	(Hungary) F Stollár (United Kingdom) I Wallace	3	6	[12]

Quarterfinals
1	(Ukraine) A Kalinina (Russia) E Kulichkova	3	6	[10]
(United Kingdom) F Christie (Latvia) J Ostapenko	6	1	[8]
4	(Russia) A Komardina (Serbia) N Stojanović	6	6
5	(Hungary) F Stollár (United Kingdom) I Wallace	3	3

Semifinals
1	(Ukraine) A Kalinina (Russia) E Kulichkova	7	7^{7}
4	(Russia) A Komardina (Serbia) N Stojanović	5	6^{3}

=== Bottom half ===
First round
8	(Australia) Priscilla Hon (Switzerland) Jil Belen Teichmann	7	6
(Australia) Chloe Hule (Australia) Petra Hule	5	0
(Russia) Anastasia Shaulskaya (Russia) Natalia Vikhlyantseva	3	6	[10]
(New Zealand) Rosie Cheng (Czech Republic) Natálie Novotná	6	3	[7]
(Australia) Naiktha Bains (Australia) Olivia Tjandramulia	6	6
(Italy) Verena Hofer (Italy) Beatrice Lombardo	3	2
(Denmark) Emilie Francati (Slovakia) Tereza Mihalíková	3	1
3	(China) Xu Shilin (China) You Xiaodi	6	6
7	(United States) Michaela Gordon (United States) Katrine Steffensen	7^{7}	6^{7}	[10]
(South Africa) Ilze Hattingh (India) Simran Kaur Sethi	6^{2}	7^{9}	[3]
(United Kingdom) Emily Arbuthnott (United States) Olivia Hauger	3	2
(Australia) Lizette Cabrera (Australia) Zoe Hives	6	6
WC	(Australia) Linda Huang (Australia) Kaylah McPhee	7	1	[10]
(China) Sun Ziyue (China) Zhang Ying	5	6	[7]
(Japan) Natsuho Arakawa (China) Ye Qiuyu	5	4
2	(United Kingdom) Katie Boulter (Serbia) Ivana Jorović	7	6

Second round
8	(Australia) P Hon (Switzerland) JB Teichmann	6	6
(Russia) A Shaulskaya (Russia) N Vikhlyantseva	3	4
(Australia) N Bains (Australia) O Tjandramulia	6^{4}	6	[12]
3	(China) S Xu (China) X You	7^{7}	3	[10]
7	(United States) M Gordon (United States) K Steffensen	1	2
(Australia) L Cabrera (Australia) Z Hives	6	6
WC	(Australia) L Huang (Australia) K McPhee	6	1	[4]
2	(United Kingdom) K Boulter (Serbia) I Jorović	2	6	[10]

Quarterfinals
8	(Australia) P Hon (Switzerland) JB Teichmann	1	4
(Australia) N Bains (Australia) O Tjandramulia	6	6
(Australia) L Cabrera (Australia) Z Hives	6^{4}	5
2	(United Kingdom) K Boulter (Serbia) I Jorović	7^{7}	7

Semifinals
(Australia) N Bains (Australia) O Tjandramulia	4	6	[5]
2	(United Kingdom) K Boulter (Serbia) I Jorović	6	3	[10]
