= 2014 Australian Open – Girls' singles =

Girls' singles
- 2014 Australian Open

Final
- Champion: (Russia) Elizaveta Kulichkova
- Runner-up: (Croatia) Jana Fett
- Score: 6–2, 6–1

Events
Singles	men	women		boys	girls
Doubles	men	women	mixed	boys	girls
WC Singles	men	women	quad
WC Doubles	men	women	quad
Legends	men	women	mixed
- Australian Open

Elizaveta Kulichkova won the title, defeating Jana Fett in the final, 6–2, 6–1.

Ana Konjuh was the defending champion, but after winning the girls' singles title at the 2013 US Open, she announced she would no longer compete on the junior tour. She received a wildcard into the women's qualifying competition and qualified for the main draw, losing to eventual champion Li Na in the first round.

== Seeds ==
1. (Russia) Varvara Flink (second round)
2. (Serbia) Ivana Jorović (quarterfinals)
3. (Ukraine) Anhelina Kalinina (second round)
4. (Russia) Elizaveta Kulichkova (champion)
5. (China) Xu Shilin (second round)
6. (Latvia) Jeļena Ostapenko (quarterfinals)
7. (China) Sun Ziyue (semifinals)
8. (Serbia) Nina Stojanović (first round)
9. (United Kingdom) Katie Boulter (third round)
10. (Russia) Anastasiya Komardina (quarterfinals)
11. (China) You Xiaodi (first round)
12. (Australia) Priscilla Hon (first round)
13. (Australia) Sara Tomic (first round)
14. (United States) Katrine Steffensen (second round)
15. (France) Fiona Ferro (third round)
16. (Hungary) Fanny Stollár (first round)

== Main draw ==
Key

- Q = Qualifier
- WC = Wild card
- LL = Lucky loser
- Alt = Alternate
- ITF = ITF entry
- PR = Protected ranking
- SR = Special ranking
- SE = Special exempt
- JE = Junior exempt
- JR = Junior Accelerator Programme entrant
- CO = College Accelerator Programme entrant
- NG = Next Gen Accelerator Program entrant
- w/o = Walkover
- r = Retired
- d = Defaulted

=== Finals ===
Quarterfinals
(United States) Olivia Hauger	2	6	3
(Croatia) Jana Fett	6	3	6
(Australia) Kimberly Birrell	6^{7}	6	6
10	(Russia) Anastasiya Komardina	7^{9}	1	3
6	(Latvia) Jeļena Ostapenko	1	6	4
4	(Russia) Elizaveta Kulichkova	6	1	6
7/Q	(China) Sun Ziyue	6	7
2	(Serbia) Ivana Jorović	3	5

Semifinals
(Croatia) Jana Fett	6	6
(Australia) Kimberly Birrell	0	4
4	(Russia) Elizaveta Kulichkova	6	7
7/Q	(China) Sun Ziyue	4	5

Final
(Croatia) Jana Fett	2	1
4	(Russia) Elizaveta Kulichkova	6	6

=== Top half ===
==== Section 1 ====
First round
1	(Russia) Varvara Flink	7	6
Q	(China) Ye Qiuyu	5	4
WC	(Australia) Chloe Hule	2	5
(United States) Olivia Hauger	6	7
WC	(Australia) Petra Hule	6^{6}	1
(Slovakia) Tereza Mihalíková	7^{8}	6
Q	(New Zealand) Rosie Cheng	6	6
16	(Hungary) Fanny Stollár	4	4
12	(Australia) Priscilla Hon	3	7	10
(United Kingdom) Isabelle Wallace	6	5	12
(Italy) Beatrice Lombardo	4	3
Q	(Czech Republic) Natálie Novotná	6	6
LL	(Australia) Nicole Kraemer	2	1
(Croatia) Jana Fett	6	6
WC	(Australia) Seone Mendez	2	1
5	(China) Xu Shilin	6	6

Second round
1	(Russia) V Flink	4	3
(United States) O Hauger	6	6
(Slovakia) T Mihalíková	6	3	6
Q	(New Zealand) R Cheng	4	6	1
(United Kingdom) I Wallace	6	6
Q	(Czech Republic) N Novotná	2	1
(Croatia) J Fett	3	6	7
5	(China) S Xu	6	4	5

Third round
(United States) O Hauger	6	6
(Slovakia) T Mihalíková	4	1
(United Kingdom) I Wallace	6	1	1
(Croatia) J Fett	3	6	6

Quarterfinals
(United States) O Hauger	2	6	3
(Croatia) J Fett	6	3	6

==== Section 2 ====
First round
3	(Ukraine) Anhelina Kalinina	6	7^{7}
(China) Cao Siqi	3	6^{4}
(United Kingdom) Emily Arbuthnott	6	6^{6}	3
(Australia) Kimberly Birrell	3	7^{8}	6
(Denmark) Emilie Francati	6	6
WC	(Australia) Sasha Bollweg	1	2
(Italy) Georgia Brescia	5	6	2
15	(France) Fiona Ferro	7	0	6
10	(Russia) Anastasiya Komardina	3	6	6
WC	(Australia) Zoe Hives	6	4	3
(India) Snehadevi Reddy	4	0
(China) Zhang Ying	6	6
(Japan) Yukina Saigo	6	4	6
WC	(Australia) Anja Dokic	4	6	4
(South Africa) Ilze Hattingh	6	6
8	(Serbia) Nina Stojanović	1	2

Second round
3	(Ukraine) A Kalinina	6	4	4
(Australia) K Birrell	2	6	6
(Denmark) E Francati	2	2
15	(France) F Ferro	6	6
10	(Russia) A Komardina	6	6
(China) Y Zhang	3	1
(Japan) Y Saigo	3	3
(South Africa) I Hattingh	6	6

Third round
(Australia) K Birrell	6	6
15	(France) F Ferro	4	1
10	(Russia) A Komardina	6	6
(South Africa) I Hattingh	4	4

Quarterfinals
(Australia) K Birrell	6^{7}	6	6
10	(Russia) A Komardina	7^{9}	1	3

=== Bottom half ===
==== Section 3 ====
First round
6	(Latvia) Jeļena Ostapenko	6	7
WC	(Australia) Kaylah McPhee	1	5
(Austria) Julia Grabher	0	5
(France) Margot Yerolymos	6	7
Q	(Japan) Shiori Fukuda	2	1
(Australia) Naiktha Bains	6	6
(Russia) Anastasia Shaulskaya	6	6
11	(China) You Xiaodi	2	4
14	(United States) Katrine Steffensen	6	6
(India) Simran Kaur Sethi	4	2
SE	(Australia) Destanee Aiava	7	6
(Italy) Verena Hofer	5	2
(United Kingdom) Freya Christie	5	3
(Australia) Lizette Cabrera	7	6
(China) Zheng Wushuang	2	0
4	(Russia) Elizaveta Kulichkova	6	6

Second round
6	(Latvia) J Ostapenko	7^{7}	6
(France) M Yerolymos	6^{5}	2
(Australia) N Bains	6	6
(Russia) A Shaulskaya	2	2
14	(United States) K Steffensen	7	2	1
SE	(Australia) D Aiava	5	6	6
(Australia) L Cabrera	1	3
4	(Russia) E Kulichkova	6	6

Third round
6	(Latvia) J Ostapenko	3	7	6
(Australia) N Bains	6	5	1
SE	(Australia) D Aiava	6^{1}	0
4	(Russia) E Kulichkova	7^{7}	6

Quarterfinals
6	(Latvia) J Ostapenko	1	6	4
4	(Russia) E Kulichkova	6	1	6

==== Section 4 ====
First round
7/Q	(China) Sun Ziyue	6	6
WC	(Australia) Linda Huang	3	0
(Australia) Olivia Tjandramulia	6	4	6
Q	(Japan) Nozomi Ohya	4	6	2
Q	(Australia) Andrea Dikosavljevic	2	0
(Russia) Natalia Vikhlyantseva	6	6
(India) Dhruthi Tatachar Venugopal	3	3
9	(United Kingdom) Katie Boulter	6	6
13	(Australia) Sara Tomic	5	2
(Thailand) Kamonwan Buayam	7	6
(Italy) Jasmine Paolini	6	1	6
(United States) Michaela Gordon	2	6	4
(Switzerland) Jil Belen Teichmann	6	6
(Brazil) Leticia Vidal	0	2
Q	(Australia) Michelle Pits	2	3
2	(Serbia) Ivana Jorović	6	6

Second round
7/Q	(China) Z Sun	6	2	6
(Australia) O Tjandramulia	1	6	2
(Russia) N Vikhlyantseva	4	3
9	(United Kingdom) K Boulter	6	6
(Thailand) K Buayam	0	6	3
(Italy) J Paolini	6	4	6
(Switzerland) JB Teichmann	2	3
2	(Serbia) I Jorović	6	6

Third round
7/Q	(China) Z Sun	6	6
9	(United Kingdom) K Boulter	2	4
(Italy) J Paolini	2	2
2	(Serbia) I Jorović	6	6

Quarterfinals
7/Q	(China) Z Sun	6	7
2	(Serbia) I Jorović	3	5
