= 2014 Australian Open – Women's legends' doubles =

Women's legends' doubles
- 2014 Australian Open

Events
Singles	men	women		boys	girls
Doubles	men	women	mixed	boys	girls
WC Singles	men	women	quad
WC Doubles	men	women	quad
Legends	men	women	mixed
← 2013 ·	Australian Open	· 2015 →

== Draw ==
=== Key ===
- Q = Qualifier
- WC = Wild card
- LL = Lucky loser
- Alt = Alternate
- ITF = ITF entry
- PR = Protected ranking
- SR = Special ranking
- SE = Special exempt
- JE = Junior exempt
- JR = Junior Accelerator Programme entrant
- CO = College Accelerator Programme entrant
- NG = Next Gen Accelerator Program entrant
- w/o = Walkover
- r = Retired
- d = Defaulted

	(United States) Austin (United States) Fernandez	(Australia) Bradtke (Australia) Stubbs	(Switzerland) Hingis (United States) Navratilova	(Croatia) Majoli (Austria) Schett	RR; W–L	Set; W–L	Game; W–L	Standings
(United States) Tracy Austin (United States) Mary Joe Fernandez		4–6, 6–7^{(4–7)}	3–6, 3–6	4–6	0–3	0–5	19–31	4
(Australia) Nicole Bradtke (Australia) Rennae Stubbs	6–3, 7–6^{(7–4)}		7–6^{(7–3)}, 1–6, [10–6]	6–3, 3–6, [10–7]	3–0	6–2	32–30	1
(Switzerland) Martina Hingis (United States) Martina Navratilova	6–3, 6–3	6–7^{(3–7)}, 6–1, [6–10]		7–6^{(7–3)}, 6–4	2–1	5–2	37–25	2
(Croatia) Iva Majoli (Austria) Barbara Schett	6–4	3–6, 6–3, [7–10]	6–7^{(3–7)}, 4–6		1–2	2–4	25–27	3

Standings are determined by: 1. number of wins; 2. number of matches; 3. in two-players-ties, head-to-head records; 4. in three-players-ties, percentage of sets won, or of games won; 5. steering-committee decision.
