= 2013 Australian Open – Wheelchair quad singles =

Wheelchair quad singles
- 2013 Australian Open

Final
- Champion: (United States) David Wagner
- Runner-up: (United Kingdom) Andrew Lapthorne
- Score: 2–6, 6–1, 6–4

Events
Singles	men	women		boys	girls
Doubles	men	women	mixed	boys	girls
WC Singles	men	women	quad
WC Doubles	men	women	quad
Legends	men	women	mixed
- Australian Open

David Wagner defeated Andrew Lapthorne in the final, 2–6, 6–1, 6–4 to win the quad singles wheelchair tennis title at the 2013 Australian Open.

Peter Norfolk was the reigning champion, but did not participate.

== Draw ==
Key

- Q = Qualifier
- WC = Wild card
- LL = Lucky loser
- Alt = Alternate
- ITF = ITF entry
- PR = Protected ranking
- SR = Special ranking
- SE = Special exempt
- JE = Junior exempt
- JR = Junior Accelerator Programme entrant
- CO = College Accelerator Programme entrant
- NG = Next Gen Accelerator Program entrant
- w/o = Walkover
- r = Retired
- d = Defaulted

=== Final ===
Final
1	(United States) David Wagner	2	6	6
2	(United Kingdom) Andrew Lapthorne	6	1	4

=== Round robin ===
		(United States) Wagner	(Sweden) Hard	(United States) Taylor	(United Kingdom) Lapthorne	RR; W–L	Set; W–L	Game; W–L	Standings
1	(United States) David Wagner		6–2, 6–3	6–1, 6–0	7–5, 1–6, 6–4	3–0	6–1	38–21	1
	(Sweden) Anders Hard	2–6, 3–6		6–3, 4–6, 1–6	6–4, 3–6, 3–6	0–3	2–6	28–43	4
	(United States) Nicholas Taylor	1–6, 0–6	3–6, 6–4, 6–1		6–7^{(5–7)}, 2–6	1–2	2–5	24–36	3
2	(United Kingdom) Andrew Lapthorne	5–7, 6–1, 4–6	4–6, 6–3, 6–3	7–6^{(7–5)}, 6–2		2–1	5–3	44–34	2

Standings are determined by: 1. number of wins; 2. number of matches; 3. in two-players-ties, head-to-head records; 4. in three-players-ties, percentage of sets won, or of games won; 5. steering-committee decision.
