= 2014 Australian Open – Boys' doubles =

Boys' doubles
- 2014 Australian Open

Final
- Champions: (Austria) Lucas Miedler (Australia) Bradley Mousley
- Runners-up: (France) Quentin Halys (France) Johan-Sébastien Tatlot
- Score: 6–4, 6–3

Events
Singles	men	women		boys	girls
Doubles	men	women	mixed	boys	girls
WC Singles	men	women	quad
WC Doubles	men	women	quad
Legends	men	women	mixed
- Australian Open

Jay Andrijic and Bradley Mousley were the defending champions, but Andrijic was no longer eligible to participate.
Mousley successfully defended the title with Lucas Miedler, defeating Quentin Halys and Johan-Sébastien Tatlot in the final, 6–4, 6–3.

== Seeds ==
1. (United States) Stefan Kozlov / (United States) Michael Mmoh (quarterfinals)
2. (Russia) Andrey Rublev / (Germany) Alexander Zverev (quarterfinals)
3. (France) Quentin Halys / (France) Johan-Sébastien Tatlot (final)
4. (Russia) Daniil Medvedev / (Russia) Roman Safiullin (quarterfinals)
5. (Austria) Lucas Miedler / (Australia) Bradley Mousley (champion)
6. (Italy) Filippo Baldi / (Germany) Johannes Härteis (second round)
7. (Australia) Omar Jasika / (Poland) Kamil Majchrzak (semifinals)
8. (South Korea) Chung Hyeon / (India) Sumit Nagal (first round)

== Draw ==
Key

- Q = Qualifier
- WC = Wild card
- LL = Lucky loser
- Alt = Alternate
- ITF = ITF entry
- PR = Protected ranking
- SR = Special ranking
- SE = Special exempt
- JE = Junior exempt
- JR = Junior Accelerator Programme entrant
- CO = College Accelerator Programme entrant
- NG = Next Gen Accelerator Program entrant
- w/o = Walkover
- r = Retired
- d = Defaulted

=== Finals ===
Semifinals
7	(Australia) Omar Jasika (Poland) Kamil Majchrzak	2	6^{5}
3	(France) Quentin Halys (France) Johan-Sébastien Tatlot	6	7^{7}
(Spain) Pedro Martínez (Spain) Jaume Antoni Munar Clar	7^{7}	3	[8]
5	(Austria) Lucas Miedler (Australia) Bradley Mousley	6^{4}	6	[10]

Final
3	(France) Quentin Halys (France) Johan-Sébastien Tatlot	4	3
5	(Austria) Lucas Miedler (Australia) Bradley Mousley	6	6

=== Top half ===
First round
1	(United States) Stefan Kozlov (United States) Michael Mmoh	6	6
(South Korea) Chung Yun-seong (South Korea) Kang Ku-keon	2	0
WC	(Australia) Max Purcell (Australia) Brian Tran	0	3
(Japan) Ken Onishi (Australia) Akira Santillan	6	6
(South Korea) Lee Duck-hee (Denmark) Simon Friis Søndergaard	4	6^{5}
(Slovakia) Martin Blaško (Slovakia) Alex Molčan	6	7^{7}
(Japan) Ryotaro Matsumura (Japan) Makoto Ochi	4	1
7	(Australia) Omar Jasika (Poland) Kamil Majchrzak	6	6
3	(France) Quentin Halys (France) Johan-Sébastien Tatlot	4	6	[10]
(Japan) Sora Fukuda (Japan) Naoki Nakagawa	6	3	[5]
(Italy) Andrea Pellegrino (Italy) Jacopo Stefanini	6	3	[9]
(China) Qiu Zhuoyang (China) Zheng Weiqiang	2	6	[11]
(Russia) Artur Shakhnubaryan (Russia) Ilya Vasilyev	7^{7}	6
(Australia) Jake Delaney (Russia) Boris Pokotilov	6^{4}	4
(Australia) Harry Bourchier (Australia) Daniel Nolan	3	6	[1]
6	(Italy) Filippo Baldi (Germany) Johannes Härteis	6	2	[10]

Second round
1	(United States) S Kozlov (United States) M Mmoh	6	6
(Japan) K Onishi (Australia) A Santillan	3	4
(Slovakia) M Blaško (Slovakia) A Molčan	3	7	[5]
7	(Australia) O Jasika (Poland) K Majchrzak	6	5	[10]
3	(France) Q Halys (France) J-S Tatlot	6	6
(China) Z Qiu (China) W Zheng	3	4
(Russia) A Shakhnubaryan (Russia) I Vasilyev	5	7^{7}	[10]
6	(Italy) F Baldi (Germany) J Härteis	7	6^{3}	[5]

Quarterfinals
1	(United States) S Kozlov (United States) M Mmoh	2	7	[8]
7	(Australia) O Jasika (Poland) K Majchrzak	6	5	[10]
3	(France) Q Halys (France) J-S Tatlot	6	6
(Russia) A Shakhnubaryan (Russia) I Vasilyev	3	4

Semifinals
7	(Australia) O Jasika (Poland) K Majchrzak	2	6^{5}
3	(France) Q Halys (France) J-S Tatlot	6	7^{7}

=== Bottom half ===
First round
8	(South Korea) Chung Hyeon (India) Sumit Nagal	3	6^{2}
(Spain) Pedro Martínez (Spain) Jaume Antoni Munar Clar	6	7^{7}
(Cyprus) Petros Chrysochos (Croatia) Nino Serdarušić	6	4	[10]
(Japan) Yusuke Takahashi (Japan) Jumpei Yamasaki	3	6	[12]
WC	(Australia) Mitchell Harper (Australia) Jack Jaeda	5	3
(South Korea) Hong Seong-chan (South Korea) Oh Chan-yeong	7	6
(Italy) Matteo Berrettini (Italy) Mirko Cutuli	6^{2}	4
4	(Russia) Daniil Medvedev (Russia) Roman Safiullin	7^{7}	6
5	(Austria) Lucas Miedler (Australia) Bradley Mousley	6	6
(Sweden) Daniel Windahl (Brazil) Marcelo Zormann da Silva	4	4
(Australia) Daniel Guccione (Australia) Marc Polmans	6	6
(New Zealand) William Matheson (Switzerland) Marko Osmakcic	3	4
(Brazil) Gabriel Vellinho Hocevar (Brazil) Rafael Matos	1	4
(Australia) Oliver Anderson (New Zealand) Alexander Klintcharov	6	6
WC	(Australia) Alex de Minaur (Australia) Daniel Hobart	2	4
2	(Russia) Andrey Rublev (Germany) Alexander Zverev	6	6

Second round
(Spain) P Martínez (Spain) JA Munar Clar	6	6
(Japan) Y Takahashi (Japan) J Yamasaki	1	1
(South Korea) S-c Hong (South Korea) C-y Oh	6	5	[14]
4	(Russia) D Medvedev (Russia) R Safiullin	3	7	[16]
5	(Austria) L Miedler (Australia) B Mousley	7^{11}	7^{7}
(Australia) D Guccione (Australia) M Polmans	6^{9}	6^{2}
(Australia) O Anderson (New Zealand) A Klintcharov	4	2
2	(Russia) A Rublev (Germany) A Zverev	6	6

Quarterfinals
(Spain) P Martínez (Spain) JA Munar Clar	7	6
4	(Russia) D Medvedev (Russia) R Safiullin	5	1
5	(Austria) L Miedler (Australia) B Mousley	6	7^{7}
2	(Russia) A Rublev (Germany) A Zverev	4	6^{3}

Semifinals
(Spain) P Martínez (Spain) JA Munar Clar	7^{7}	3	[8]
5	(Austria) L Miedler (Australia) B Mousley	6^{4}	6	[10]
