= 2014 Australian Open – Wheelchair women's doubles =

Wheelchair women's doubles
- 2014 Australian Open

Final
- Champions: (Japan) Yui Kamiji (United Kingdom) Jordanne Whiley
- Runners-up: (Netherlands) Marjolein Buis (Netherlands) Jiske Griffioen
- Score: 6–2, 6–7^{(3–7)}, 6–2

Events
Singles	men	women		boys	girls
Doubles	men	women	mixed	boys	girls
WC Singles	men	women	quad
WC Doubles	men	women	quad
Legends	men	women	mixed
← 2013 ·	Australian Open	· 2015 →

Yui Kamiji and Jordanne Whiley defeated the defending champion Jiske Griffioen and her partner Marjolein Buis in the final, 6–2, 6–7^{(3–7)}, 6–2 to win the women's doubles wheelchair tennis title at the 2014 Australian Open. It was their first step towards an eventual Grand Slam.

Griffioen and Aniek van Koot were the reigning champions, but van Koot did not participate due to injury.

== Seeds ==
1. (Japan) Yui Kamiji / (United Kingdom) Jordanne Whiley (champions)
2. (Netherlands) Marjolein Buis / (Netherlands) Jiske Griffioen (final)

== Draw ==
=== Key ===
- Q = Qualifier
- WC = Wild card
- LL = Lucky loser
- Alt = Alternate
- ITF = ITF entry
- PR = Protected ranking
- SR = Special ranking
- SE = Special exempt
- JE = Junior exempt
- JR = Junior Accelerator Programme entrant
- CO = College Accelerator Programme entrant
- NG = Next Gen Accelerator Program entrant
- w/o = Walkover
- r = Retired
- d = Defaulted

=== Finals ===
Semifinals
1	(Japan) Yui Kamiji (United Kingdom) Jordanne Whiley	6	7^{7}
(Germany) Sabine Ellerbrock (South Africa) Kgothatso Montjane	4	6^{4}
(United Kingdom) Lucy Shuker (Netherlands) Sharon Walraven	3	1
2	(Netherlands) Marjolein Buis (Netherlands) Jiske Griffioen	6	6

Final
1	(Japan) Yui Kamiji (United Kingdom) Jordanne Whiley	6	6^{3}	6
2	(Netherlands) Marjolein Buis (Netherlands) Jiske Griffioen	2	7^{7}	2
