= 2014 Australian Open – Men's legends' doubles =

Men's legends' doubles
- 2014 Australian Open

Events
Singles	men	women		boys	girls
Doubles	men	women	mixed	boys	girls
WC Singles	men	women	quad
WC Doubles	men	women	quad
Legends	men	women	mixed
← 2013 ·	Australian Open	· 2015 →

== Draw ==
=== Key ===
- Q = Qualifier
- WC = Wild card
- LL = Lucky loser
- Alt = Alternate
- ITF = ITF entry
- PR = Protected ranking
- SR = Special ranking
- SE = Special exempt
- JE = Junior exempt
- JR = Junior Accelerator Programme entrant
- CO = College Accelerator Programme entrant
- NG = Next Gen Accelerator Program entrant
- w/o = Walkover
- r = Retired
- d = Defaulted

=== Finals ===
Final
(Australia) Todd Woodbridge (Australia) Mark Woodforde	4	6	[13]
(Sweden) Jonas Björkman (Sweden) Thomas Enqvist	6	2	[11]

=== Newcombe group ===
	(France) Noah (France) Santoro	(Iran) Bahrami (France) Pioline	(Australia) Woodbridge (Australia) Woodforde	(Australia) Cash (Sweden) Wilander	RR W–L	Set W–L	Game W–L	Standings
(France) Yannick Noah (France) Fabrice Santoro		6–1, 1–6, [12–10]	6–4, 3–6, [9–11]	7–6^{(7–4)}, 3–6, [10–6]	2–1	5–5	29–30	2
(Iran) Mansour Bahrami (France) Cédric Pioline	1–6, 6–1, [10–12]		6–4, 2–6, [9–11]	6–7^{(2–7)}, 6–1, [10–8]	1–2	4–5	28–27	3
(Australia) Todd Woodbridge (Australia) Mark Woodforde	4–6, 6–3, [11–9]	4–6, 6–2, [11–9]		6–3, 1–6, [10–3]	3–0	6–3	30–26	1
(Australia) Pat Cash (Sweden) Mats Wilander	6–7^{(4–7)}, 6–3, [6–10]	7–6^{(7–2)}, 1–6, [8–10]	3–6, 6–1, [3–10]		0–3	3–6	30–32	4

Standings are determined by: 1. number of wins; 2. number of matches; 3. in two-players-ties, head-to-head records; 4. in three-players-ties, percentage of sets won, or of games won; 5. steering-committee decision.

=== Roche group ===
	(South Africa) Ferreira (Croatia) Ivanišević	(France) Forget (France) Leconte	(Sweden) Björkman (Sweden) Enqvist	(Australia) Eagle (Australia) Florent	RR W–L	Set W–L	Game W–L	Standings
(South Africa) Wayne Ferreira (Croatia) Goran Ivanišević		2–6, 7–6^{(7–5)}, [8–10]	6–4, 3–6, [8–10]	6–7^{(3–7)}, 6–1, [7–10]	0–3	3–6	30–33	4
(France) Guy Forget (France) Henri Leconte	6–2, 6–7^{(5–7)}, [10–8]		3–6, 6–7^{(8–10)}	6–3, 4–6, [10–7]	2–1	4–4	33–31	2
(Sweden) Jonas Björkman (Sweden) Thomas Enqvist	4–6, 6–3, [10–8]	6–3, 7–6^{(10–8)}		6–3, 6–4	3–0	6–1	36–25	1
(Australia) Joshua Eagle (Australia) Andrew Florent	7–6^{(7–3)}, 1–6, [10–7]	3–6, 6–4, [7–10]	3–6, 4–6		1–2	3–5	25–35	3

Standings are determined by: 1. number of wins; 2. number of matches; 3. in two-players-ties, head-to-head records; 4. in three-players-ties, percentage of sets won, or of games won; 5. steering-committee decision.
