= 2013 Australian Open – Wheelchair women's singles =

Wheelchair women's singles
- 2013 Australian Open

Final
- Champion: (Netherlands) Aniek van Koot
- Runner-up: (Germany) Sabine Ellerbrock
- Score: 6–1, 1–6, 7–5

Events
Singles	men	women		boys	girls
Doubles	men	women	mixed	boys	girls
WC Singles	men	women	quad
WC Doubles	men	women	quad
Legends	men	women	mixed
← 2012 ·	Australian Open	· 2014 →

Aniek van Koot defeated Sabine Ellerbrock in the final, 6–1, 1–6, 7–5 to win the women's singles wheelchair tennis title at the 2013 Australian Open.

Esther Vergeer was the two-time reigning champion, but did not participate. She would announce her retirement from professional wheelchair tennis in February of that year.

The 2013 Optus Australian Open Wheelchair women's singles featured eight players and had two seeds and one wild card. All matches were played as best-of-three-sets.

== Draw ==
=== Key ===
- Q = Qualifier
- WC = Wild card
- LL = Lucky loser
- Alt = Alternate
- ITF = ITF entry
- PR = Protected ranking
- SR = Special ranking
- SE = Special exempt
- JE = Junior exempt
- JR = Junior Accelerator Programme entrant
- CO = College Accelerator Programme entrant
- NG = Next Gen Accelerator Program entrant
- w/o = Walkover
- r = Retired
- d = Defaulted

Quarterfinals
1	(Netherlands) Aniek van Koot	6	7
WC	(South Africa) Kgothatso Montjane	1	5
(Netherlands) Jiske Griffioen	6^{13}	4
(Netherlands) Marjolein Buis	7^{15}	6
(United Kingdom) Lucy Shuker	2	6	6
(Australia) Daniela Di Toro	6	4	4
(Netherlands) Sharon Walraven	2	3
2	(Germany) Sabine Ellerbrock	6	6

Semifinals
1	(Netherlands) Aniek van Koot	1	7^{8}	6
(Netherlands) Marjolein Buis	6	6^{6}	3
(United Kingdom) Lucy Shuker	6^{1}	5
2	(Germany) Sabine Ellerbrock	7^{7}	7

Final
1	(Netherlands) Aniek van Koot	6	1	7
2	(Germany) Sabine Ellerbrock	1	6	5
