= 2013 Australian Open – Wheelchair quad doubles =

Wheelchair quad doubles
- 2013 Australian Open

Final
- Champions: (United States) David Wagner (United States) Nicholas Taylor
- Runners-up: (United Kingdom) Andrew Lapthorne (Sweden) Anders Hard
- Score: 6–2, 6–3

Events
Singles	men	women		boys	girls
Doubles	men	women	mixed	boys	girls
WC Singles	men	women	quad
WC Doubles	men	women	quad
Legends	men	women	mixed
- Australian Open

David Wagner and Nicholas Taylor defeated the two-time defending champion Andrew Lapthorne and his partner Anders Hard in the final, 6–2, 6–3 to win the quad doubles wheelchair tennis title at the 2013 Australian Open.

Lapthorne and Peter Norfolk were the two-time reigning champions, but Norfolk did not participate.

== Seeds ==
1. (United States) David Wagner / (United States) Nicholas Taylor (champions)
2. (United Kingdom) Andrew Lapthorne / (Sweden) Anders Hard (final)

== Main draw ==
Key

- Q = Qualifier
- WC = Wild card
- LL = Lucky loser
- Alt = Alternate
- ITF = ITF entry
- PR = Protected ranking
- SR = Special ranking
- SE = Special exempt
- JE = Junior exempt
- JR = Junior Accelerator Programme entrant
- CO = College Accelerator Programme entrant
- NG = Next Gen Accelerator Program entrant
- w/o = Walkover
- r = Retired
- d = Defaulted

=== Final ===
Finals
1	(United States) David Wagner (United States) Nicholas Taylor	6	6
2	(United Kingdom) Andrew Lapthorne (Sweden) Anders Hard	2	3
