= 2013 Australian Open – Wheelchair women's doubles =

Wheelchair women's doubles
- 2013 Australian Open

Final
- Champions: (Netherlands) Jiske Griffioen (Netherlands) Aniek van Koot
- Runners-up: (United Kingdom) Lucy Shuker (Netherlands) Marjolein Buis
- Score: 6–4, 6–3

Events
Singles	men	women		boys	girls
Doubles	men	women	mixed	boys	girls
WC Singles	men	women	quad
WC Doubles	men	women	quad
Legends	men	women	mixed
← 2012 ·	Australian Open	· 2014 →

Jiske Griffioen and Aniek van Koot defeated Marjolein Buis and Lucy Shuker in the final, 6–4, 6–3 to win the women's doubles wheelchair tennis title at the 2013 Australian Open. It was their first step towards an eventual Grand Slam.

Esther Vergeer and Sharon Walraven were the two-time reigning champions, but Vergeer did not compete. Walraven partnered Sabine Ellerbrock, but was defeated in the semifinals by Buis and Shuker.

The 2013 Australian Open – Wheelchair women's doubles was a tennis tournament featuring 8 paraplegic women tennis players, which was part of the NEC Tour. The tournament took place at Melbourne Park in Melbourne, Australia, from 25 January to 28 January 2012. It was the 10th edition of the Australian Open men's wheelchair event and the first Grand Slam event of 2013. The tournament was played on Plexicushion Prestige AO hard courts, which was rated a medium-fast pace by the ITF. The competition was organised by the International Tennis Federation and Tennis Australia.

== Seeds ==
1. (Netherlands) Jiske Griffioen / (Netherlands) Aniek van Koot (champions)
2. (United Kingdom) Lucy Shuker / (Netherlands) Marjolein Buis (final)

== Draw ==
=== Key ===
- Q = Qualifier
- WC = Wild card
- LL = Lucky loser
- Alt = Alternate
- ITF = ITF entry
- PR = Protected ranking
- SR = Special ranking
- SE = Special exempt
- JE = Junior exempt
- JR = Junior Accelerator Programme entrant
- CO = College Accelerator Programme entrant
- NG = Next Gen Accelerator Program entrant
- w/o = Walkover
- r = Retired
- d = Defaulted

=== Finals ===
Semifinals
1	(Netherlands) Jiske Griffioen (Netherlands) Aniek van Koot	6	1	7
(South Africa) Kgothatso Montjane (Australia) Daniela Di Toro	0	6	5
(Germany) Sabine Ellerbrock (Netherlands) Sharon Walraven	5	3
2	(United Kingdom) Lucy Shuker (Netherlands) Marjolein Buis	7	6

Final
1	(Netherlands) Jiske Griffioen (Netherlands) Aniek van Koot	6	6
2	(United Kingdom) Lucy Shuker (Netherlands) Marjolein Buis	4	3
