= 2013 Australian Open – Boys' singles =

Boys' singles
- 2013 Australian Open

Final
- Champion: (Australia) Nick Kyrgios
- Runner-up: (Australia) Thanasi Kokkinakis
- Score: 7–6^{(7–4)}, 6–3

Events
Singles	men	women		boys	girls
Doubles	men	women	mixed	boys	girls
WC Singles	men	women	quad
WC Doubles	men	women	quad
Legends	men	women	mixed
- Australian Open

Nick Kyrgios defeated Thanasi Kokkinakis in the final, 7–6^{(7–4)}, 6–3 to win the boys' singles tennis title at the 2013 Australian Open.

Luke Saville was the defending champion, but was no longer eligible to compete in junior tournaments.

== Seeds ==
1. (Serbia) Nikola Milojević (quarterfinals)
2. (Italy) Gianluigi Quinzi (quarterfinals)
3. (Australia) Nick Kyrgios (champion)
4. (Serbia) Laslo Djere (first round)
5. (Sweden) Elias Ymer (first round)
6. (South Korea) Chung Hyeon (third round)
7. (South Africa) Wayne Montgomery (quarterfinals)
8. (Italy) Filippo Baldi (semifinals)
9. (Chile) Christian Garín (third round)
10. (Germany) Maximilian Marterer (second round)
11. (Croatia) Borna Ćorić (semifinals)
12. (United States) Thai-Son Kwiatkowski (first round)
13. (United States) Mackenzie McDonald (second round)
14. (Japan) Yoshihito Nishioka (third round)
15. (South Korea) Hong Seong-chan (first round)
16. (Canada) Hugo Di Feo (third round)

== Draw ==
Key

- Q = Qualifier
- WC = Wild card
- LL = Lucky loser
- Alt = Alternate
- ITF = ITF entry
- PR = Protected ranking
- SR = Special ranking
- SE = Special exempt
- JE = Junior exempt
- JR = Junior Accelerator Programme entrant
- CO = College Accelerator Programme entrant
- NG = Next Gen Accelerator Program entrant
- w/o = Walkover
- r = Retired
- d = Defaulted

=== Finals ===
Quarterfinals
1	(Serbia) Nikola Milojević	6	3	3
8	(Italy) Filippo Baldi	2	6	6
3	(Australia) Nick Kyrgios	6	6
7	(South Africa) Wayne Montgomery	1	1
11	(Croatia) Borna Ćorić	6	6
(Slovakia) Matej Maruščák	3	2
WC	(Australia) Thanasi Kokkinakis	7^{7}	2	8
2	(Italy) Gianluigi Quinzi	6^{5}	6	6

Semifinals
8	(Italy) Filippo Baldi	2	1
3	(Australia) Nick Kyrgios	6	6
11	(Croatia) Borna Ćorić	3	2
WC	(Australia) Thanasi Kokkinakis	6	6

Final
3	(Australia) Nick Kyrgios	7^{7}	6
WC	(Australia) Thanasi Kokkinakis	6^{4}	3

=== Top half ===
==== Section 1 ====
First round
1	(Serbia) Nikola Milojević	6	6
(Philippines) Jurence Zosimo Mendoza	3	1
(Canada) Brayden Schnur	6	0	5
WC	(Australia) Oliver Anderson	2	6	7
(Austria) Lucas Miedler	6	6
(France) Johan Sébastien Tatlot	2	2
(South Korea) Kim Duk-young	6	0	1
13	(United States) Mackenzie McDonald	3	6	6
9	(Chile) Christian Garin	7^{7}	6
(Japan) Takashi Saito	6^{2}	2
WC	(Australia) Jacob Grills	4	6^{4}
Q	(South Korea) Lee Duck-hee	6	7^{7}
(Germany) Hannes Wagner	6	7^{7}
(Slovakia) Jakub Oravec	3	6^{2}
(Australia) Jay Andrijic	4	2
8	(Italy) Filippo Baldi	6	6

Second round
1	(Serbia) N Milojević	6	1	8
WC	(Australia) O Anderson	2	6	6
(Austria) L Miedler	6	6
13	(United States) M McDonald	4	2
9	(Chile) C Garin	6	6
Q	(South Korea) D-h Lee	3	3
(Germany) H Wagner	5	2
8	(Italy) F Baldi	7	6

Third round
1	(Serbia) N Milojević	6	6
(Austria) L Miedler	4	2
9	(Chile) C Garin	3	5
8	(Italy) F Baldi	6	7

Quarterfinal
1	(Serbia) N Milojević	6	3	3
8	(Italy) F Baldi	2	6	6

==== Section 2 ====
First round
3	(Australia) Nick Kyrgios	6	6
(Turkey) Cem İlkel	3	1
(New Zealand) Cameron Norrie	6	7^{7}
Q	(China) Liu Siyu	4	6^{4}
Q	(Japan) Naoki Nakagawa	7^{7}	6
Q	(Sweden) Gustav Hansson	6^{5}	3
(Australia) Omar Jasika	3	6	6
15	(South Korea) Hong Seong-chan	6	4	1
10	(Germany) Maximilian Marterer	6	6
WC	(Australia) Daniel Guccione	4	4
(Croatia) Franko Miočić	7	6
(Russia) Aleksandr Ivanovich Spirin	5	1
(Italy) Stefano Napolitano	6	4	3
(France) Quentin Halys	2	6	6
(Australia) Harry Bourchier	6^{4}	6	7
7	(South Africa) Wayne Montgomery	7^{7}	1	9

Second round
3	(Australia) N Kyrgios	6	6
(New Zealand) C Norrie	3	1
Q	(Japan) N Nakagawa	3	2
(Australia) O Jasika	6	6
10	(Germany) M Marterer	4	4
(Croatia) F Miočić	6	6
(France) Q Halys	4	4
7	(South Africa) W Montgomery	6	6

Third round
3	(Australia) N Kyrgios	6	6
(Australia) O Jasika	4	3
(Croatia) F Miočić	3	1
7	(South Africa) W Montgomery	6	6

Quarterfinal
3	(Australia) N Kyrgios	6	6
7	(South Africa) W Montgomery	1	1

=== Bottom half ===
==== Section 3 ====
First round
6	(South Korea) Chung Hyeon	6	6
WC	(Australia) Jake Delaney	1	2
(France) Maxime Hamou	1	0
Q	(Hong Kong) Yeung Pak-long	6	6
(Chile) Nicolás Jarry	2	4
WC	(Australia) Marc Polmans	6	6
(United States) Martin Redlicki	2	4
11	(Croatia) Borna Ćorić	6	6
14	(Japan) Yoshihito Nishioka	6	6
(Russia) Karen Khachanov	4	2
(Egypt) Mazen Osama	1	2
WC	(Australia) Akira Santillan	6	6
(Austria) Dominic Weidinger	3	6^{3}
Q	(Germany) Paul Wörner	6	7^{7}
(Slovakia) Matej Maruščák	6	6^{7}	6
4	(Serbia) Laslo Djere	4	7^{9}	2

Second round
6	(South Korea) H Chung	6	6
Q	(Hong Kong) P-l Yeung	1	4
WC	(Australia) M Polmans	1	1
11	(Croatia) B Ćorić	6	6
14	(Japan) Y Nishoka	6	6
WC	(Australia) A Santillan	0	2
Q	(Germany) P Wörner	1	3
(Slovakia) M Maruščák	6	6

Third round
6	(South Korea) H Chung	6^{6}	4
11	(Croatia) B Ćorić	7^{8}	6
14	(Japan) Y Nishoka	6	1	7
(Slovakia) M Maruščák	4	6	9

Quarterfinal
11	(Croatia) B Ćorić	6	6
(Slovakia) M Maruščák	3	2

==== Section 4 ====
First round
5	(Sweden) Elias Ymer	4	0
(South Korea) Kang Ku-keon	6	6
WC	(Australia) Blake Mott	1	3
(France) Enzo Couacaud	6	6
(Czech Republic) Robin Staněk	6	6
(China) Zheng Weiqiang	4	3
WC	(Australia) Thanasi Kokkinakis	7	6
12	(United States) Thai-Son Kwiatkowski	5	4
16	(Canada) Hugo Di Feo	6	6
(Serbia) Luka Ilić	4	2
Q	(Cyprus) Petros Chrysochos	2	6	6
Q	(Germany) Alexander Zverev	6	2	0
(Russia) Anton Desyatnik	2	1
(South Korea) Kim Young-seok	6	6
(Australia) Bradley Mousley	4	0
2	(Italy) Gianluigi Quinzi	6	6

Second round
(South Korea) K-k Kang	1	3
(France) E Couacaud	6	6
(Czech Republic) R Staněk	6	4	3
WC	(Australia) T Kokkinakis	2	6	6
16	(Canada) H Di Feo	6^{2}	7^{7}	6
Q	(Cyprus) P Chrysochos	7^{7}	6^{2}	2
(South Korea) Y-s Kim	2	4
2	(Italy) G Quinzi	6	6

Third round
(France) E Couacaud	2	0
WC	(Australia) T Kokkinakis	6	6
16	(Canada) H Di Feo	1	4
2	(Italy) G Quinzi	6	6

Quarterfinal
WC	(Australia) T Kokkinakis	7^{7}	2	8
2	(Italy) G Quinzi	6^{5}	6	6
