= 2013 Australian Open – Women's legends' doubles =

Women's legends' doubles
- 2013 Australian Open

Final

Events
| Singles | men | women | | boys | girls |
| Doubles | men | women | mixed | boys | girls |
| WC Singles | men | women | quad |
| WC Doubles | men | women | quad |
| Legends | men | women | mixed |
| ← 2012 · | Australian Open | · 2014 → |

== Draw ==
=== Key ===
- Q = Qualifier
- WC = Wild card
- LL = Lucky loser
- Alt = Alternate
- ITF = ITF entry
- PR = Protected ranking
- SR = Special ranking
- SE = Special exempt
- JE = Junior exempt
- JR = Junior Accelerator Programme entrant
- CO = College Accelerator Programme entrant
- NG = Next Gen Accelerator Program entrant
- w/o = Walkover
- r = Retired
- d = Defaulted

=== Final ===
| Final |
| 1 | (Switzerland) Martina Hingis (United States) Martina Navratilova |
| 2 | (Croatia) Iva Majoli (Austria) Barbara Schett |

=== Round robin ===
| | (Croatia) Majoli (Austria) Schett | (Australia) Bradtke (Australia) Stubbs | (United States) Davenport (Zimbabwe) Black (France) Mauresmo | (Switzerland) Hingis (United States) Navratilova | RR; W–L | Set; W–L | Game; W–L | Standings |
| (Croatia) Iva Majoli (Austria) Barbara Schett | | 7–5, 6–1 | 6–3, 1–6, [10–5] (w/ Mauresmo) | 3–6, 2–6 | 2–1 | 4–3 | 26–27 | 2 |
| (Australia) Nicole Bradtke (Australia) Rennae Stubbs | 5–7, 1–6 | | 6–4, 3–6, [10–6] (w/ Mauresmo) | 3–6, 6–7^{(0–7)} | 0–3 | 1–6 | 24–37 | 4 |
| (United States) Lindsay Davenport (Zimbabwe) Cara Black (France) Amélie Mauresmo | 3–6, 6–1, [5–10] (w/ Mauresmo) | 4–6, 6–3, [10–6] (w/ Mauresmo) | | 6–7^{(4–7)} (w/ Black) | 0–1; 1–1 | 0–1; 3–3 | 6–7; 20–17 | X 3 |
| (Switzerland) Martina Hingis (United States) Martina Navratilova | 6–3, 6–2 | 6–3, 7–6^{(7–0)} | 7–6^{(7–4)} (w/ Black) | | 3–0 | 5–0 | 32–20 | 1 |

Standings are determined by: 1. number of wins; 2. number of matches; 3. in two-players-ties, head-to-head records; 4. in three-players-ties, percentage of sets won, or of games won; 5. steering-committee decision.
