= 2013 Australian Open – Men's legends' doubles =

Men's legends' doubles
- 2013 Australian Open

Final
- Champions: (Australia) (Australia)
- Runners-up: (Australia) (Australia)

Events
Singles	men	women		boys	girls
Doubles	men	women	mixed	boys	girls
WC Singles	men	women	quad
WC Doubles	men	women	quad
Legends	men	women	mixed
← 2012 ·	Australian Open	· 2014 →

== Draw ==
=== Key ===
- Q = Qualifier
- WC = Wild card
- LL = Lucky loser
- Alt = Alternate
- ITF = ITF entry
- PR = Protected ranking
- SR = Special ranking
- SE = Special exempt
- JE = Junior exempt
- JR = Junior Accelerator Programme entrant
- CO = College Accelerator Programme entrant
- NG = Next Gen Accelerator Program entrant
- w/o = Walkover
- r = Retired
- d = Defaulted

=== Final ===
Final
(Australia) Todd Woodbridge (Australia) Mark Woodforde
(Australia) Wayne Arthurs (Australia) Pat Cash

=== Group A ===
	(Australia) Woodbridge (Australia) Woodforde	(Iran) Bahrami (South Africa) Ferreira	(Netherlands) Eltingh (Netherlands) Haarhuis	(Australia) Cahill (Sweden) Wilander (Australia) Arthurs	RR; W–L	Set; W–L	Game; W–L	Standings
(Australia) Todd Woodbridge (Australia) Mark Woodforde		7–6^{(19–17)}, 6–4	7–5, 3–6, [10–3]	6–2, 6–4 (w/ Wilander)	3–0	6–1	36–27	1
(Iran) Mansour Bahrami (South Africa) Wayne Ferreira	6–7^{(17–19)}, 4–6		3–6, 4–6	6–2, 4–6, [10–8] (w/ Arthurs)	1–2	2–5	28–33	3
(Netherlands) Jacco Eltingh (Netherlands) Paul Haarhuis	5–7, 6–3, [3–10]	6–3, 6–4		7–6^{(7–4)}, 6–2 (w/ Wilander)	2–1	5–2	36–26	2
(Australia) Darren Cahill (Sweden) Mats Wilander (Australia) Wayne Arthurs	2–6, 4–6 (w/ Wilander)	2–6, 6–4, [8–10] (w/ Arthurs)	6–7^{(4–7)}, 2–6 (w/ Wilander)		0–2; 0–1	0–4; 1–2	14–25; 8–11	4 X

Standings are determined by: 1. number of wins; 2. number of matches; 3. in two-players-ties, head-to-head records; 4. in three-players-ties, percentage of sets won, or of games won; 5. steering-committee decision.

=== Group B ===
	(Croatia) Ivanišević (France) Pioline	(France) Forget (France) Leconte	(Australia) Arthurs (Australia) Cash (Croatia) Ivanišević	(Sweden) Enqvist (France) Santoro	RR; W–L	Set; W–L	Game; W–L	Standings
(Croatia) Goran Ivanišević (France) Cédric Pioline		7–5, 5–7, [10–6]	6–4, 6–7^{(8–10)}, [5–10] (w/ Arthurs)	6–1, 2–6, [8–10]	1–2	4–5	33–32	3
(France) Guy Forget (France) Henri Leconte	5–7, 7–5, [6–10]		6–7^{(6–8)}, 6–2, [8–10] (w/ Ivanišević)	6–4, 4–6, [10–7]	1–2	4–5	35–33	2
(Australia) Wayne Arthurs (Australia) Pat Cash (Croatia) Goran Ivanišević	4–6, 7–6^{(10–8)}, [10–5] (w/ Arthurs)	7–6^{(8–6)}, 2–6, [10–8] (w/ Ivanišević)		7–6^{(7–5)}, 6–7^{(3–7)}, [10–7] (w/ Arthurs)	2–0; 1–0	4–2; 2–1	26–25; 10–12	1 X
(Sweden) Thomas Enqvist (France) Fabrice Santoro	1–6, 6–2, [10–8]	4–6, 6–4, [7–10]	6–7^{(5–7)}, 7–6^{(7–3)}, [7–10] (w/ Arthurs)		1–2	4–5	31–33	4

Standings are determined by: 1. number of wins; 2. number of matches; 3. in two-players-ties, head-to-head records; 4. in three-players-ties, percentage of sets won, or of games won; 5. steering-committee decision.
