= Adam Kellerman =

Australian wheelchair tennis player

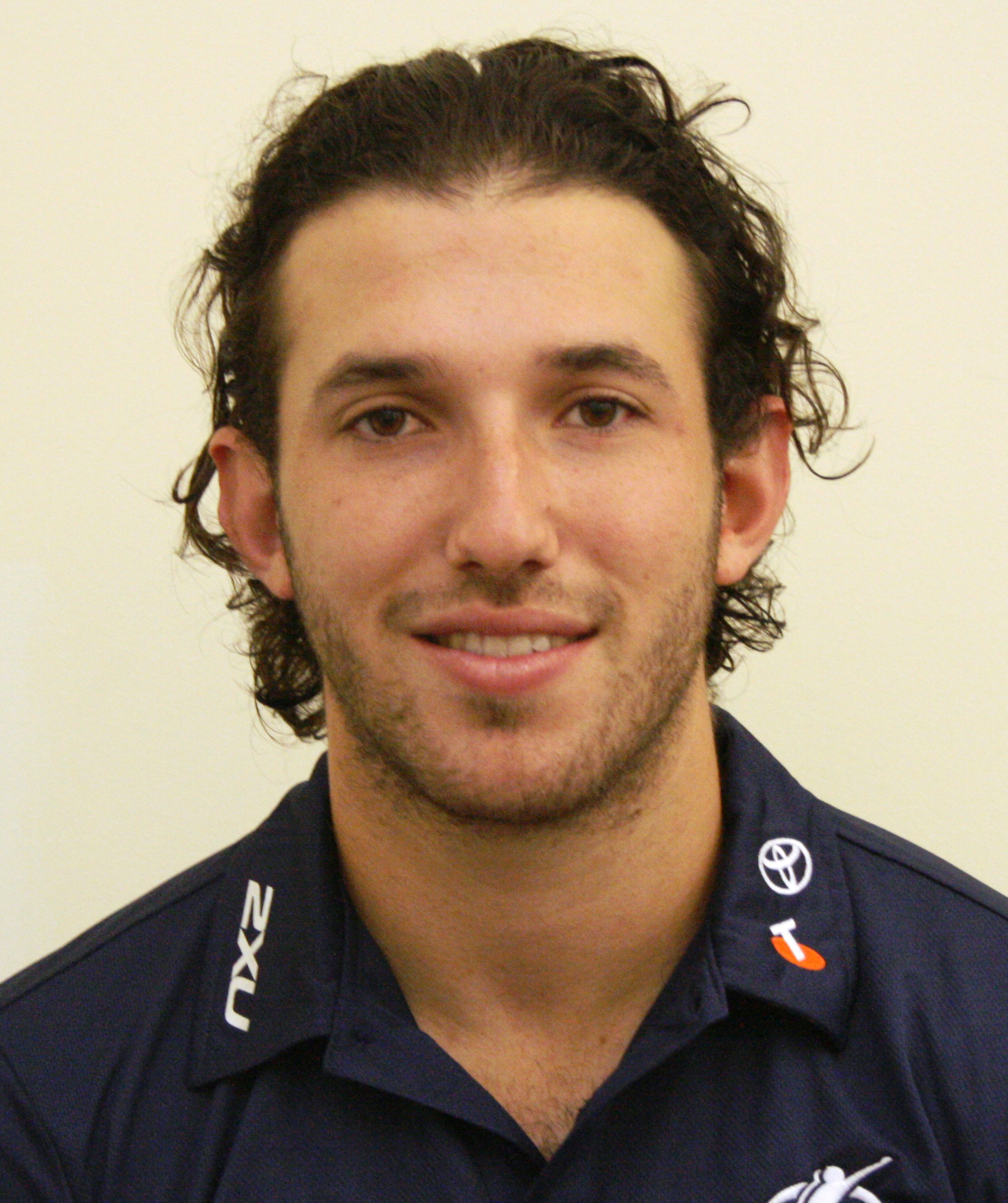
- 2012 Australian Paralympic team portrait of Kellerman
- Country (sports): Australia
- Born: 26 July 1990 (age 36) Sydney, New South Wales
- Official website: www.adamkellerman.com

Singles
- Highest ranking: No.8 (6 June 2016)
- Current ranking: Retired.

Grand Slam singles results
- Australian Open: QF (2016, 2018)

Doubles
- Highest ranking: No.14 (29 June 2015)

Grand Slam doubles results
- Australian Open: SF (2016, 2018)
- Last updated on: 21 July 2016.

Adam Kellerman (born 26 July 1990) is an Australian wheelchair tennis player. When he was thirteen years old, he was diagnosed with a form of cancer called Ewing sarcoma. He represented Australia at the 2012 Summer Paralympics in the men's singles and doubles wheelchair tennis events. As of 21 July 2016, he is ranked Number 1 in Australia and Number 11 in the World for Men's Single Wheelchair Tennis. He competed for Australia at the 2016 Rio Paralympics.

== Personal ==
While dealing with his cancer, he developed an infection that resulted in the removal of his right hip which resulted in limited use of his right leg. His medical condition left him in a state of depression that lasted 2 years and he had ongoing chronic pain.

He attended Masada College High School. In 2010, he won the New South Wales Maccabi Sportsman of the Year. In 2014 he won Tennis Australia's Most Outstanding Athlete with a Disability. He attended the University of Arizona for 3 semesters before leaving university to pursue his tennis career. He works as a motivational keynote speaker and resilience and wellbeing coach.

Kellerman is right handed.

== Wheelchair tennis ==
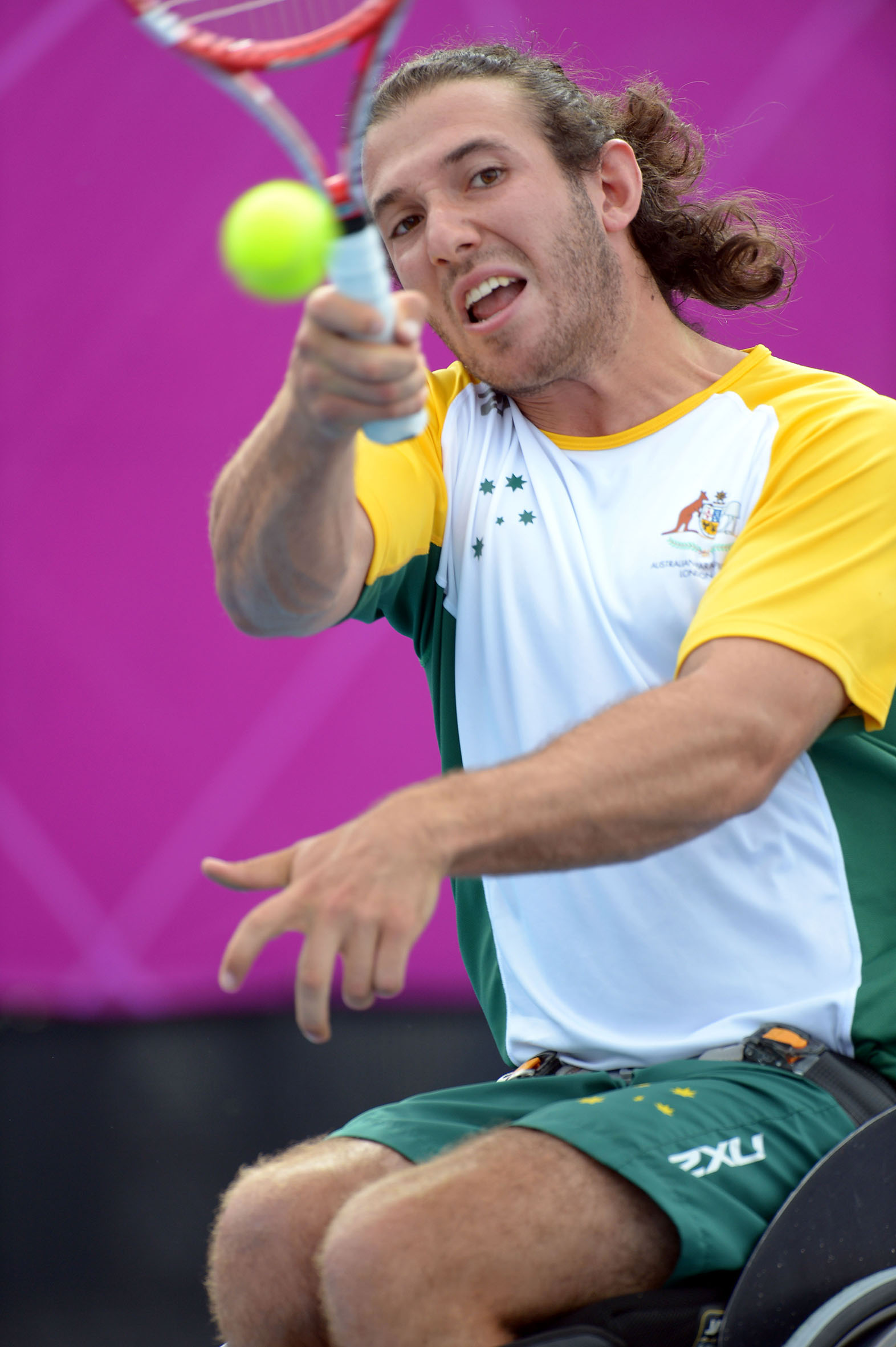

Adam Kellerman is a wheelchair tennis player. When playing, he follows the same rules as his able-bodied counterparts except the ball is allowed to bounce twice. He started playing tennis in December 2006, and took up the sport full-time in 2011.

Kellerman first represented Australia in 2007, and was a member of Australia's junior national team in 2007 and 2008. In 2008, he played some doubles matches with Ben Weekes.

At the beginning of 2012, Kellerman was ranked 61st in the world. By June 2012, he was ranked 29th in the world and number two in Australia. He had worked hard to improve his ranking over the course of the year because only the top 46 ranked players in the world qualified for the Paralympics. In the last half of 2011 and first half of 2012, he participated in 21 different competitions.

Kellerman was selected to represent Australia at the 2012 Summer Paralympics in London, United Kingdom, in the men's singles and the doubles event where he teamed up with Ben Weekes. The Games were his first. He was twenty-two years old at the Games. Prior to competing at the 2012 Summer Paralympics, he had only played wheelchair tennis for five and a half years.

He made the round of 16 in the men's singles and doubles at the London Games.

Leading up to the 2016 Rio Paralympics, Kellerman reached his career high ranking of 8 in the world. Soon afterwards he injured his right shoulder which almost ended his chances of competing in Rio. He ended up making it although not at full fitness. Kellerman lost to Gustavo Fernández (4 in the world) (ARG) 0–2 (1–6, 2–6) in the Men's Singles round of 16 and in the Men's Doubles with Ben Weekes lost in the round of 16.

== Recognition ==
- 2010 - New South Wales Maccabi Sportsman of the Year.
- 2014 – Tennis Australia Most Outstanding Athlete with a Disability.

== Post Wheelchair Tennis Career ==
In July 2017 Kellerman was part of a humanitarian trip to Tanzania with one of his sponsors EG Funds to visit one of the charities they support Neema Crafts. Kellerman shared his story and message of "to look for your abilities and strengths beyond any physical disability" with the staff of the Neema Crafts. He also took this opportunity to run a training camp and donate equipment to the wheelchair tennis teams in Tanzania and Kenya.

In Tanzania, Kellerman met former NSW parliamentarian Tony Stewart who had arranged an amazing welcome and tour at the orphanage he has supported for many years. Tony Stewart challenged Kellerman to walk the Kokoda Track to raise money for Youth Off The Streets in collaboration with Clubs NSW as sponsor. In October 2018 Kellerman, with business partner and friend Rani Vincent walked the Kokoda Track in 8 days. They were accompanied by a team of 9 others and raised $56,000 for Youth Off The Streets.

Kellerman retired from wheelchair tennis in January 2019. Since then he has trained in a year long program to offer mentorships, completed a 200hr Yoga Teacher Training and is a Certified Calligraphy Health Instructor. He finishes a Meditation Teacher (Holistic Counselling) Certificate in December 2023.
