= 2013 Australian Open – Women's singles qualifying =

Women's singles qualifying
- 2013 Australian Open

Events
Singles	men	women		boys	girls
Doubles	men	women	mixed	boys	girls
WC Singles	men	women	quad
WC Doubles	men	women	quad
Legends	men	women	mixed

Qualification
Singles	men	women
- Australian Open

This article displays the qualifying draw for the women's singles event at the 2013 Australian Open.

== Seeds ==
1. (Ukraine) Lesia Tsurenko (qualified)
2. (Puerto Rico) Monica Puig (first round)
3. (Hungary) Gréta Arn (qualified)
4. (Germany) Tatjana Malek (qualifying competition)
5. (Chinese Taipei) Chan Yung-jan (qualified)
6. (Serbia) Vesna Dolonc (qualified)
7. (Spain) Estrella Cabeza Candela (qualifying competition)
8. (Italy) Karin Knapp (qualified)
9. (United States) Julia Cohen (first round)
10. (United States) Alexa Glatch (first round)
11. (Czech Republic) Eva Birnerová (first round)
12. (United States) Maria Sanchez (second round)
13. (Portugal) Maria João Koehler (qualified)
14. (China) Duan Yingying (qualifying competition)
15. (Portugal) Michelle Larcher de Brito (qualified)
16. (France) Claire Feuerstein (second round)
17. (China) Zheng Saisai (first round)
18. (Canada) Stéphanie Dubois (qualifying competition)
19. (Australia) Anastasia Rodionova (second round)
20. (Germany) Dinah Pfizenmaier (first round)
21. (Argentina) Paula Ormaechea (first round)
22. (United Kingdom) Anne Keothavong (first round)
23. (Colombia) Mariana Duque (first round)
24. (Canada) Eugenie Bouchard (second round)

== Qualifiers ==
1. (Ukraine) Lesia Tsurenko
2. (Russia) Valeria Savinykh
3. (Hungary) Gréta Arn
4. (Russia) Vera Dushevina
5. (Chinese Taipei) Chan Yung-jan
6. (Serbia) Vesna Dolonc
7. (Uzbekistan) Akgul Amanmuradova
8. (Italy) Karin Knapp
9. (Thailand) Luksika Kumkhum
10. (Portugal) Maria João Koehler
11. (Russia) Daria Gavrilova
12. (Portugal) Michelle Larcher de Brito

== Qualifying draw ==
Key

- Q = Qualifier
- WC = Wild card
- LL = Lucky loser
- Alt = Alternate
- ITF = ITF entry
- PR = Protected ranking
- SR = Special ranking
- SE = Special exempt
- JE = Junior exempt
- JR = Junior Accelerator Programme entrant
- CO = College Accelerator Programme entrant
- NG = Next Gen Accelerator Program entrant
- w/o = Walkover
- r = Retired
- d = Defaulted

=== First qualifier ===
First round
1	(Ukraine) Lesia Tsurenko	6	6^{5}	6
(United States) Bethanie Mattek-Sands	3	7^{7}	3
(Ukraine) Maryna Zanevska	4	6	6
(United States) Jill Craybas	6	2	2
(Thailand) Tamarine Tanasugarn	6	2	8
(Turkey) Çağla Büyükakçay	4	6	10
(Ukraine) Lyudmyla Kichenok	3	7	8
21	(Argentina) Paula Ormaechea	6	5	6

Second round
1	(Ukraine) Lesia Tsurenko	6	6
(Ukraine) Maryna Zanevska	3	4
(Turkey) Çağla Büyükakçay	6	6
(Ukraine) Lyudmyla Kichenok	4	1

Qualifying competition
1	(Ukraine) Lesia Tsurenko	6	6
(Turkey) Çağla Büyükakçay	3	1

=== Second qualifier ===
First round
2	(Puerto Rico) Monica Puig	6	3	5
(China) Wang Qiang	4	6	7
WC	(Australia) Priscilla Hon	7^{7}	3	0
(Russia) Valeria Solovyeva	6^{5}	6	6
(Russia) Valeria Savinykh	2	6	6
(France) Victoria Larrière	6	3	4
(Italy) Nastassja Burnett	5	6	4
19	(Australia) Anastasia Rodionova	7	0	6

Second round
(China) Wang Qiang	2	2
(Russia) Valeria Solovyeva	6	6
(Russia) Valeria Savinykh	7^{7}	4	6
19	(Australia) Anastasia Rodionova	6^{5}	6	2

Qualifying competition
(Russia) Valeria Solovyeva	1	2
(Russia) Valeria Savinykh	6	6

=== Third qualifier ===
First round
3	(Hungary) Gréta Arn	6	6
(Japan) Akiko Omae	1	2
WC	(Australia) Storm Sanders	2	2
(Ukraine) Yuliya Beygelzimer	6	6
(Russia) Irina Khromacheva	3	7	0
(Croatia) Tereza Mrdeža	6	5	6
(Israel) Julia Glushko	6	4	7
23	(Colombia) Mariana Duque	2	6	5

Second round
3	(Hungary) Gréta Arn	6	6
(Ukraine) Yuliya Beygelzimer	1	2
(Croatia) Tereza Mrdeža	0	6	6
(Israel) Julia Glushko	6	4	3

Qualifying competition
3	(Hungary) Gréta Arn	6	5	6
(Croatia) Tereza Mrdeža	4	7	4

=== Fourth qualifier ===
First round
4	(Germany) Tatjana Malek	6	6
(United States) Madison Brengle	3	2
(Japan) Yurika Sema	4	3
(United States) Nicole Gibbs	6	6
(Russia) Vera Dushevina	6	4	6
(United States) Jessica Pegula	4	6	1
(United States) Grace Min	7	7
22	(United Kingdom) Anne Keothavong	5	5

Second round
4	(Germany) Tatjana Malek	0	6	6
(United States) Nicole Gibbs	6	4	3
(Russia) Vera Dushevina	6	6
(United States) Grace Min	2	4

Qualifying competition
4	(Germany) Tatjana Malek	6	6^{3}	3
(Russia) Vera Dushevina	4	7^{7}	6

=== Fifth qualifier ===
First round
5	(Chinese Taipei) Chan Yung-jan	6	6
WC	(Australia) Abbie Myers	1	2
(United States) Irina Falconi	6	6
(France) Irina Pavlovic	4	3
(Germany) Kathrin Wörle	6	6
PR	(Kazakhstan) Zarina Diyas	2	4
(United States) Shelby Rogers	3	4
14	(China) Duan Yingying	6	6

Second round
5	(Chinese Taipei) Chan Yung-jan	6	6
(United States) Irina Falconi	1	2
(Germany) Kathrin Wörle	7^{7}	3	3
14	(China) Duan Yingying	6^{5}	6	6

Qualifying competition
5	(Chinese Taipei) Chan Yung-jan	6	6
14	(China) Duan Yingying	3	1

=== Sixth qualifier ===
First round
6	(Serbia) Vesna Dolonc	6	6
(Slovakia) Anna Karolína Schmiedlová	1	1
(Spain) Inés Ferrer Suárez	4	4
(Japan) Erika Sema	6	6
(Russia) Alla Kudryavtseva	5	3
(Bosnia and Herzegovina) Mervana Jugić-Salkić	7	6
(Russia) Ekaterina Bychkova	3	2
18	(Canada) Stéphanie Dubois	6	6

Second round
6	(Serbia) Vesna Dolonc	6	6
(Japan) Erika Sema	1	3
(Bosnia and Herzegovina) Mervana Jugić-Salkić	0	4
18	(Canada) Stéphanie Dubois	6	6

Qualifying competition
6	(Serbia) Vesna Dolonc	6	6
18	(Canada) Stéphanie Dubois	1	0

=== Seventh qualifier ===
First round
7	(Spain) Estrella Cabeza Candela	6	6
(Thailand) Nudnida Luangnam	1	3
(Ukraine) Olga Savchuk	6	7^{7}
(Canada) Sharon Fichman	4	6^{4}
(France) Julie Coin	6	5	4
(Uzbekistan) Akgul Amanmuradova	4	7	6
(Australia) Monique Adamczak	6	2	6
20	(Germany) Dinah Pfizenmaier	1	6	4

Second round
7	(Spain) Estrella Cabeza Candela	6	6
(Ukraine) Olga Savchuk	4	3
(Uzbekistan) Akgul Amanmuradova	6	6
(Australia) Monique Adamczak	2	3

Qualifying competition
7	(Spain) Estrella Cabeza Candela	3	4
(Uzbekistan) Akgul Amanmuradova	6	6

=== Eighth qualifier ===
First round
8	(Italy) Karin Knapp	6	6
WC	(Australia) Jessica Moore	2	1
(Italy) Corinna Dentoni	6	6
(Romania) Raluca Olaru	2	3
(Serbia) Aleksandra Krunić	5	6	7
(Italy) Maria Elena Camerin	7	4	9
(United States) Alison Riske	6	6
17	(China) Zheng Saisai	2	2

Second round
8	(Italy) Karin Knapp	6	7
(Italy) Corinna Dentoni	0	5
(Italy) Maria Elena Camerin	3	4
(United States) Alison Riske	6	6

Qualifying competition
8	(Italy) Karin Knapp	6	2	6
(United States) Alison Riske	4	6	1

=== Ninth qualifier ===
First round
9	(United States) Julia Cohen	0	1
(Japan) Kurumi Nara	6	6
(Spain) María José Martínez Sánchez	6	3	1
(Thailand) Luksika Kumkhum	4	6	6
(Russia) Marta Sirotkina	6	6
(Canada) Marie-Ève Pelletier	2	1
WC	(Australia) Viktorija Rajicic	4	5
16	(France) Claire Feuerstein	6	7

Second round
(Japan) Kurumi Nara	1	7	3
(Thailand) Luksika Kumkhum	6	5	6
(Russia) Marta Sirotkina	6	7^{7}
16	(France) Claire Feuerstein	2	6^{5}

Qualifying competition
(Thailand) Luksika Kumkhum	7^{8}	3	6
(Russia) Marta Sirotkina	6^{6}	6	2

=== Tenth qualifier ===
First round
10	(United States) Alexa Glatch	4	4
(Spain) Arantxa Parra Santonja	6	6
(Australia) Arina Rodionova	6	6
(Argentina) María Irigoyen	1	4
PR	(Czech Republic) Zuzana Ondrášková	3	0
WC	(Australia) Tammi Patterson	6	6
(United States) Chiara Scholl	3	1
13	(Portugal) Maria João Koehler	6	6

Second round
(Spain) Arantxa Parra Santonja	3	6	3
(Australia) Arina Rodionova	6	1	6
WC	(Australia) Tammi Patterson	3	4
13	(Portugal) Maria João Koehler	6	6

Qualifying competition
(Australia) Arina Rodionova	2	6	1
13	(Portugal) Maria João Koehler	6	4	6

=== Eleventh qualifier ===
First round
11	(Czech Republic) Eva Birnerová	4	3
(China) Zhou Yimiao	6	6
(Latvia) Anastasija Sevastova	3	7^{10}	4
(United Kingdom) Johanna Konta	6	6^{8}	6
(Liechtenstein) Stephanie Vogt	3	4
(Russia) Daria Gavrilova	6	6
(Brazil) Teliana Pereira	6	3	2
24	(Canada) Eugenie Bouchard	4	6	6

Second round
(China) Zhou Yimiao	7	2	8
(United Kingdom) Johanna Konta	5	6	6
(Russia) Daria Gavrilova	7^{9}	7^{8}
24	(Canada) Eugenie Bouchard	6^{7}	6^{6}

Qualifying competition
(China) Zhou Yimiao	6	4	5
(Russia) Daria Gavrilova	4	6	7

=== Twelfth qualifier ===
First round
12	(United States) Maria Sanchez	7	6
(France) Virginie Razzano	5	2
(South Africa) Chanel Simmonds	7^{7}	3	6
(Japan) Junri Namigata	6^{5}	6	4
(Romania) Cristina Mitu	6	6
WC	(Australia) Sally Peers	0	0
WC	(Australia) Azra Hadzic	1	1
15	(Portugal) Michelle Larcher de Brito	6	6

Second round
12	(United States) Maria Sanchez	4	4
(South Africa) Chanel Simmonds	6	6
(Romania) Cristina Mitu	6	5	2
15	(Portugal) Michelle Larcher de Brito	1	7	6

Qualifying competition
(South Africa) Chanel Simmonds	6	1	6
15	(Portugal) Michelle Larcher de Brito	4	6	8
