= 2013 Australian Open – Men's singles qualifying =

Men's singles qualifying
- 2013 Australian Open

Events
Singles	men	women		boys	girls
Doubles	men	women	mixed	boys	girls
WC Singles	men	women	quad
WC Doubles	men	women	quad
Legends	men	women	mixed

Qualification
Singles	men	women
- Australian Open

This article displays the qualifying draw for the Men's singles at the 2013 Australian Open.

== Players ==
=== Seeds ===
1. (Austria) Andreas Haider-Maurer (second round)
2. (Lithuania) Ričardas Berankis (qualified)
3. (Israel) Dudi Sela (qualified)
4. (Belgium) Ruben Bemelmans (qualified)
5. (Argentina) Martín Alund (first round)
6. (France) Kenny de Schepper (second round)
7. (Germany) Daniel Brands (qualified)
8. (France) Florent Serra (qualifying competition)
9. (United States) James Blake (second round)
10. (Germany) Matthias Bachinger (second round)
11. (United States) Tim Smyczek (qualifying competition, lucky loser)
12. (Russia) Alex Bogomolov Jr. (qualified)
13. (Netherlands) Thiemo de Bakker (second round)
14. (Japan) Yuichi Sugita (first round)
15. (United States) Rajeev Ram (qualified)
16. (Croatia) Antonio Veić (first round)
17. (Germany) Michael Berrer (qualifying competition)
18. (United States) Denis Kudla (first round)
19. (Italy) Matteo Viola (second round)
20. (France) Marc Gicquel (second round)
21. (United States) Ryan Sweeting (qualifying competition)
22. (United States) Wayne Odesnik (first round)
23. (Belarus) Uladzimir Ignatik (first round)
24. (France) Jonathan Dasnières de Veigy (first round)
25. (Switzerland) Marco Chiudinelli (qualifying competition)
26. (United States) Jack Sock (first round, retired)
27. (Germany) Simon Greul (first round, retired)
28. (Thailand) Danai Udomchoke (second round)
29. (Ukraine) Ivan Sergeyev (first round)
30. (Chinese Taipei) Jimmy Wang (first round)
31. (Belgium) Maxime Authom (qualified)
32. (China) Ze Zhang (first round)

== Qualifiers ==
1. (France) Adrian Mannarino
2. (Lithuania) Ričardas Berankis
3. (Israel) Dudi Sela
4. (Belgium) Ruben Bemelmans
5. (Israel) Amir Weintraub
6. (United States) Steve Johnson
7. (Germany) Daniel Brands
8. (Belgium) Maxime Authom
9. (United Kingdom) Jamie Baker
10. (Spain) Adrián Menéndez
11. (Germany) Cedrik-Marcel Stebe
12. (Russia) Alex Bogomolov Jr.
13. (Spain) Arnau Brugués-Davi
14. (Germany) Julian Reister
15. (United States) Rajeev Ram
16. (Spain) Daniel Muñoz de la Nava

== Lucky loser ==
1. (United States) Tim Smyczek

== Qualifying draw ==
Key

- Q = Qualifier
- WC = Wild card
- LL = Lucky loser
- Alt = Alternate
- ITF = ITF entry
- PR = Protected ranking
- SR = Special ranking
- SE = Special exempt
- JE = Junior exempt
- JR = Junior Accelerator Programme entrant
- CO = College Accelerator Programme entrant
- NG = Next Gen Accelerator Program entrant
- w/o = Walkover
- r = Retired
- d = Defaulted

=== First qualifier ===
First round
1	(Austria) Andreas Haider-Maurer	7	6
(Kazakhstan) Evgeny Korolev	5	2
(Indonesia) Christopher Rungkat	3	2
(Canada) Peter Polansky	6	6
(Australia) Brydan Klein	5	1
(Italy) Riccardo Ghedin	7	6
(France) Adrian Mannarino	6	7
29	(Ukraine) Ivan Sergeyev	2	5

Second round
1	(Austria) Andreas Haider-Maurer	5	6^{4}
(Canada) Peter Polansky	7	7^{7}
(Italy) Riccardo Ghedin	2	1
(France) Adrian Mannarino	6	6

Qualifying competition
(Canada) Peter Polansky	1	3
(France) Adrian Mannarino	6	6

=== Second qualifier ===
First round
2	(Lithuania) Ričardas Berankis	6	6
(Germany) Peter Gojowczyk	3	4
(United States) Bradley Klahn	6	6
WC	(Australia) Nick Kyrgios	3	2
(Italy) Gianluca Naso	3	2
(Czech Republic) Jan Hernych	6	6
(Chile) Paul Capdeville	6^{4}	7^{7}	3
26	(United States) Jack Sock	7^{7}	6^{1}	1^{r}

Second round
2	(Lithuania) Ričardas Berankis	4	6	6
(United States) Bradley Klahn	6	4	2
(Czech Republic) Jan Hernych	4	4
(Chile) Paul Capdeville	6	6

Qualifying competition
2	(Lithuania) Ričardas Berankis	6	6
(Chile) Paul Capdeville	2	1

=== Third qualifier ===
First round
3	(Israel) Dudi Sela	6	4
(Spain) Sergio Gutiérrez Ferrol	1	1^{r}
(Russia) Igor Kunitsyn	7^{9}	7^{7}
(Czech Republic) Ivo Minář	6^{7}	6^{4}
(Germany) Dominik Meffert	7	6^{5}	2
(France) Pierre-Hugues Herbert	5	7^{7}	6
(Poland) Michał Przysiężny	2	3
17	(Germany) Michael Berrer	6	6

Second round
3	(Israel) Dudi Sela	6	6
(Russia) Igor Kunitsyn	2	3
(France) Pierre-Hugues Herbert	5	3
17	(Germany) Michael Berrer	7	6

Qualifying competition
3	(Israel) Dudi Sela	4	6	6
17	(Germany) Michael Berrer	6	2	4

=== Fourth qualifier ===
First round
4	(Belgium) Ruben Bemelmans	6	7
(Kazakhstan) Andrey Golubev	3	5
(Australia) Samuel Groth	2	2
WC	(France) Lucas Pouille	6	6
(Croatia) Nikola Mektić	4	2
(Turkey) Marsel İlhan	6	6
(France) Vincent Millot	6^{4}	6	4
28	(Thailand) Danai Udomchoke	7^{7}	3	6

Second round
4	(Belgium) Ruben Bemelmans	6	6
WC	(France) Lucas Pouille	4	1
(Turkey) Marsel İlhan	4	6	6
28	(Thailand) Danai Udomchoke	6	3	1

Qualifying competition
4	(Belgium) Ruben Bemelmans	7^{10}	6
(Turkey) Marsel İlhan	6^{8}	4

=== Fifth qualifier ===
First round
5	(Argentina) Martín Alund	6	0	2
(Argentina) Diego Schwartzman	0	6	6
(Italy) Thomas Fabbiano	6	4	6
(India) Yuki Bhambri	3	6	4
(South Africa) Rik de Voest	6	6^{4}	3
(Moldova) Radu Albot	4	7^{7}	6
(Israel) Amir Weintraub	7^{7}	4	6
22	(United States) Wayne Odesnik	6^{4}	6	3

Second round
(Argentina) Diego Schwartzman	6	6
(Italy) Thomas Fabbiano	4	4
(Moldova) Radu Albot	7^{10}	4	0
(Israel) Amir Weintraub	6^{8}	6	6

Qualifying competition
(Argentina) Diego Schwartzman	4	3
(Israel) Amir Weintraub	6	6

=== Sixth qualifier ===
First round
6	(France) Kenny de Schepper	7	6
(Brazil) Fabiano de Paula	5	1
WC	(Australia) Thanasi Kokkinakis	4	7^{7}	15
(United States) Steve Johnson	6	6^{5}	17
WC	(Australia) Jordan Thompson	4	6	9
(France) Nicolas Renavand	6	2	7
(United States) Alex Kuznetsov	4	2
21	(United States) Ryan Sweeting	6	6

Second round
6	(France) Kenny de Schepper	6^{6}	6^{4}
(United States) Steve Johnson	7^{8}	7^{7}
WC	(Australia) Jordan Thompson	2	4
21	(United States) Ryan Sweeting	6	6

Qualifying competition
(United States) Steve Johnson	6	6
21	(United States) Ryan Sweeting	3	4

=== Seventh qualifier ===
First round
7	(Germany) Daniel Brands	6^{4}	6	7
(Canada) Frank Dancevic	7^{7}	4	5
(France) Grégoire Burquier	3	4
(France) David Guez	6	6
(Canada) Steven Diez	2	6	7
(Slovakia) Pavol Červenák	6	4	5
(Spain) Javier Martí	6	6
30	(Chinese Taipei) Jimmy Wang	4	4

Second round
7	(Germany) Daniel Brands	6	6
(France) David Guez	2	4
(Canada) Steven Diez	7	2	3
(Spain) Javier Martí	5	6	6

Qualifying competition
7	(Germany) Daniel Brands	6	6
(Spain) Javier Martí	4	4

=== Eighth qualifier ===
First round
8	(France) Florent Serra	4	6	6
(Slovakia) Andrej Martin	6	2	0
WC	(Australia) Alex Bolt	7^{7}	6
(Netherlands) Boy Westerhof	6^{5}	4
(Germany) Dustin Brown	4	6	6
(Japan) Hiroki Moriya	6	4	2
WC	(Australia) Jacob Grills	3	1
31	(Belgium) Maxime Authom	6	6

Second round
8	(France) Florent Serra	6	5	8
WC	(Australia) Alex Bolt	4	7	6
(Germany) Dustin Brown	5	1
31	(Belgium) Maxime Authom	7	6

Qualifying competition
8	(France) Florent Serra	4	4
31	(Belgium) Maxime Authom	6	6

=== Ninth qualifier ===
First round
9	(United States) James Blake	6	6
(Romania) Marius Copil	4	4
(United States) Donald Young	6	6
(Bosnia and Herzegovina) Aldin Šetkić	3	4
(Ecuador) Julio César Campozano	3	5
(United Kingdom) Jamie Baker	6	7
(Netherlands) Matwé Middelkoop	2	6	3
19	(Italy) Matteo Viola	6	4	6

Second round
9	(United States) James Blake	5	4
(United States) Donald Young	7	6
(United Kingdom) Jamie Baker	3	6	6
19	(Italy) Matteo Viola	6	2	4

Qualifying competition
(United States) Donald Young	4	6	3
(United Kingdom) Jamie Baker	6	1	6

=== Tenth qualifier ===
First round
10	(Germany) Matthias Bachinger	6	7^{7}
(France) Stéphane Robert	3	6^{2}
(Canada) Érik Chvojka	6^{4}	3
(Spain) Adrián Menéndez	7^{7}	6
(Ukraine) Denys Molchanov	7^{7}	6
(Uzbekistan) Farrukh Dustov	6^{5}	4
(United States) Denis Zivkovic	2	3
20	(France) Marc Gicquel	6	6

Second round
10	(Germany) Matthias Bachinger	6^{3}	3
(Spain) Adrián Menéndez	7^{7}	6
(Ukraine) Denys Molchanov	6	3	6
20	(France) Marc Gicquel	4	6	3

Qualifying competition
(Spain) Adrián Menéndez	6	6
(Ukraine) Denys Molchanov	4	3

=== Eleventh qualifier ===
First round
11	(United States) Tim Smyczek	6	6
(Brazil) Marcelo Demoliner	2	2
(Slovakia) Kamil Čapkovič	1	3
(Australia) Matthew Barton	6	6
(United States) Daniel Kosakowski	7	4	3
WC	(Australia) Adam Feeney	5	6	6
(Germany) Cedrik-Marcel Stebe	6	6
23	(Belarus) Uladzimir Ignatik	3	4

Second round
11	(United States) Tim Smyczek	3	6	6
(Australia) Matthew Barton	6	4	1
WC	(Australia) Adam Feeney	5	4
(Germany) Cedrik-Marcel Stebe	7	6

Qualifying competition
11	(United States) Tim Smyczek	4	2
(Germany) Cedrik-Marcel Stebe	6	6

=== Twelfth qualifier ===
First round
12	(Russia) Alex Bogomolov Jr.	6	6
(Belgium) Niels Desein	3	2
(Italy) Potito Starace	4	4
(United States) Tennys Sandgren	6	6
(United States) Michael Yani	6	3	6
(Bosnia and Herzegovina) Mirza Bašić	3	6	3
(Chinese Taipei) Chen Ti	7^{7}	0
27	(Germany) Simon Greul	6^{4}	0^{r}

Second round
12	(Russia) Alex Bogomolov Jr.	7^{9}	6
(United States) Tennys Sandgren	6^{7}	3
(United States) Michael Yani	6	7
(Chinese Taipei) Chen Ti	2	5

Qualifying competition
12	(Russia) Alex Bogomolov Jr.	6	4
(United States) Michael Yani	3	3^{r}

=== Thirteenth qualifier ===
First round
13	(Netherlands) Thiemo de Bakker	6	6
(Ukraine) Oleksandr Nedovyesov	3	4
(Netherlands) Jesse Huta Galung	6	3	5
(Germany) Jan-Lennard Struff	2	6	7
(Chinese Taipei) Yang Tsung-hua	6	6
(Germany) Bastian Knittel	3	0
(Spain) Arnau Brugués-Davi	6	6
32	(China) Zhang Ze	3	2

Second round
13	(Netherlands) Thiemo de Bakker	4	1
(Germany) Jan-Lennard Struff	6	6
(Chinese Taipei) Yang Tsung-hua	5	6	3
(Spain) Arnau Brugués-Davi	7	4	6

Qualifying competition
(Germany) Jan-Lennard Struff	1	3
(Spain) Arnau Brugués-Davi	6	6

=== Fourteenth qualifier ===
First round
14	(Japan) Yuichi Sugita	1	6	1
(Germany) Mischa Zverev	6	3	6
(Serbia) Boris Pašanski	4	3
(United Kingdom) James Ward	6	6
WC	(Australia) Matt Reid	6	6
(Brazil) Ricardo Hocevar	2	4
PR	(Germany) Julian Reister	7^{7}	6
18	(United States) Denis Kudla	6^{2}	2

Second round
(Germany) Mischa Zverev	7^{7}	4	4
(United Kingdom) James Ward	6^{1}	6	6
WC	(Australia) Matt Reid	6^{2}	4
PR	(Germany) Julian Reister	7^{7}	6

Qualifying competition
(United Kingdom) James Ward	3	5
PR	(Germany) Julian Reister	6	7

=== Fifteenth qualifier ===
First round
15	(United States) Rajeev Ram	6	7^{7}
(France) Nicolas Devilder	3	6^{5}
(France) Jonathan Eysseric	6	6
(Chile) Hans Podlipnik-Castillo	3	2
(Bosnia and Herzegovina) Damir Džumhur	6	6
(South Africa) Izak van der Merwe	3	4
(Italy) Alessandro Giannessi	3	7	4
25	(Switzerland) Marco Chiudinelli	6	5	6

Second round
15	(United States) Rajeev Ram	6^{7}	6	6
(France) Jonathan Eysseric	7^{9}	1	3
(Bosnia and Herzegovina) Damir Džumhur	6	2	1
25	(Switzerland) Marco Chiudinelli	3	6	6

Qualifying competition
15	(United States) Rajeev Ram	5	6	11
25	(Switzerland) Marco Chiudinelli	7	2	9

=== Sixteenth qualifier ===
First round
16	(Croatia) Antonio Veić	3	7^{7}	4
(Czech Republic) Jan Mertl	6	6^{5}	6
(Serbia) Dušan Lajović	6	7^{8}
(Brazil) Guilherme Clezar	3	6^{6}
(Colombia) Robert Farah	3	3
(Spain) Daniel Muñoz de la Nava	6	6
(France) Maxime Teixeira	6	6
24	(France) Jonathan Dasnières de Veigy	4	0

Second round
(Czech Republic) Jan Mertl	6	6^{5}	6
(Serbia) Dušan Lajović	1	7^{7}	4
(Spain) Daniel Muñoz de la Nava	6	6
(France) Maxime Teixeira	2	2

Qualifying competition
(Czech Republic) Jan Mertl	5	0
(Spain) Daniel Muñoz de la Nava	7	6
