= 2013 Australian Open =

- Date: 14–27 January 2013
- Edition: 101st
- Category: Grand Slam (ITF)
- Draw: 128S/64D/32X
- Surface: Hard (Plexicushion)
- Location: Melbourne, Victoria, Australia
- Venue: Melbourne Park

Champions

Men's singles
- (Serbia) Novak Djokovic

Women's singles
- (Belarus) Victoria Azarenka

Men's doubles
- (United States) Bob Bryan / (United States) Mike Bryan

Women's doubles
- (Italy) Sara Errani / (Italy) Roberta Vinci

Mixed doubles
- (Australia) Jarmila Gajdošová / (Australia) Matthew Ebden

Wheelchair men's singles
- (Japan) Shingo Kunieda

Wheelchair women's singles
- (Netherlands) Aniek van Koot

Wheelchair quad singles
- (United States) David Wagner

Wheelchair men's doubles
- (France) Michaël Jérémiasz / (Japan) Shingo Kunieda

Wheelchair women's doubles
- (Netherlands) Jiske Griffioen / (Netherlands) Aniek van Koot

Wheelchair quad doubles
- (United States) David Wagner / (United States) Nicholas Taylor

Boys' singles
- (Australia) Nick Kyrgios

Girls' singles
- (Croatia) Ana Konjuh

Boys' doubles
- (Australia) Jay Andrijic / (Australia) Bradley Mousley

Girls' doubles
- (Croatia) Ana Konjuh / (Canada) Carol Zhao
- Australian Open

The 2013 Australian Open was a tennis tournament that took place in Melbourne Park in Melbourne, Australia, from 14 to 27 January 2013. It was the 101st edition of the Australian Open, and the first Grand Slam event of the year. The tournament consisted of events for professional players in singles, doubles and mixed doubles play. Junior and wheelchair players competed in singles and doubles tournaments.

All four of the main events in singles and same-sex doubles were won by the top seeds—Novak Djokovic in men's singles, Victoria Azarenka in women's singles, Bob and Mike Bryan in men's doubles, and Sara Errani and Roberta Vinci in women's doubles. This year's Australian Open was the first Grand Slam event since that tournament's 2004 edition in which the women's singles and doubles were won by the top seeds, and the first Grand Slam event since the 1997 Wimbledon Championships in which the men's and women's singles and doubles were all won by the top seeds. In addition, this year's Australian Open remains the most recent Grand Slam where the men's and women's singles titles were both successfully defended.

== Point and prize money distribution ==
=== Point distribution ===
Below is a series of tables for each of the competitions showing the ranking points on offer for each event.

==== Seniors points ====
Event	W	F	SF	QF	Round of 16	Round of 32	Round of 64	Round of 128	Q	Q3	Q2	Q1
Men's singles	2000	1200	720	360	180	90	45	10	25	16	8	0
Men's doubles	2000	1200	720	360	180	90	0	—N/a	—N/a	—N/a	—N/a	—N/a
Women's singles	2000	1400	900	500	280	160	100	5	60	50	40	2
Women's doubles	2000	1400	900	500	280	160	5	—N/a	—N/a	—N/a	—N/a	—N/a

==== Junior points ====
Event	W	F	SF	QF	Round of 16	Round of 32	Q	Q3
Boys' singles	375	270	180	120	75	30	25	20
Girls' singles	375	270	180	120	75	30	25	20
Boys' doubles	270	180	120	75	45	—		
Girls' doubles	270	180	120	75	45	—		

==== Wheelchair points ====
	Men's singles	Men's doubles	Women's singles	Women's doubles	Quad singles	Quad doubles
Champion	700					
Runner up	500					100
Semifinals/3rd	375	100	375	100	375	—N/a
Quarterfinals/4th	100	—N/a	100	—N/a	100	—N/a

=== Prize money ===
The 2013 Australian Open featured a significant increase in prize money in comparison with previous years, with all players competing for a share of AUD$30 million, becoming the highest paying tournament of all time. This was the result of an ATP players' meeting, primarily focusing on the money received by players who exit the competition in the earlier rounds. All prize money is in Australian dollars (AUD).

Event	W	F	SF	QF	Round of 16	Round of 32	Round of 64	Round of 128	Q3	Q2	Q1
Singles	$2,430,000	$1,215,000	$500,000	$250,000	$125,000	$71,000	$45,500	$27,600	$13,120	$6,560	$3,280
Doubles *	$475,000	$237,500	$118,750	$60,000	$33,500	$19,500	$12,500	—N/a	—N/a	—N/a	—N/a
Mixed doubles *	$135,500	$67,500	$33,900	$15,500	$7,800	$3,800	—N/a	—N/a	—N/a	—N/a	—N/a

_{* per team}

== Singles players ==
Men's singles

Champion		Runner-up	
(Serbia) Novak Djokovic [1]		(United Kingdom) Andy Murray [3]	
Semifinals out
(Spain) David Ferrer [4]		(Switzerland) Roger Federer [2]	
Quarterfinals out
(Czech Republic) Tomáš Berdych [5]	(Spain) Nicolás Almagro [10]	(France) Jérémy Chardy	(France) Jo-Wilfried Tsonga [7]
4th round out
(Switzerland) Stanislas Wawrinka [15]	(South Africa) Kevin Anderson	(Japan) Kei Nishikori [16]	(Serbia) Janko Tipsarević [8]
(Italy) Andreas Seppi [21]	(France) Gilles Simon [14]	(France) Richard Gasquet [9]	(Canada) Milos Raonic [13]
3rd round out
(Czech Republic) Radek Štěpánek [31]	(United States) Sam Querrey [20]	(Spain) Fernando Verdasco [22]	(Austria) Jürgen Melzer [26]
(Cyprus) Marcos Baghdatis [28]	(Russia) Evgeny Donskoy	(Poland) Jerzy Janowicz [24]	(France) Julien Benneteau [32]
(Argentina) Juan Martín del Potro [6]	(Croatia) Marin Čilić [12]	(France) Gaël Monfils	(Lithuania) Ričardas Berankis (Q)
(Slovenia) Blaž Kavčič	(Croatia) Ivan Dodig	(Germany) Philipp Kohlschreiber [17]	(Australia) Bernard Tomic
2nd round out
(United States) Ryan Harrison	(Spain) Feliciano López	(United States) Brian Baker	(Germany) Tobias Kamke
(Russia) Andrey Kuznetsov	(Belgium) Xavier Malisse	(Spain) Roberto Bautista Agut	(France) Guillaume Rufin
(United States) Tim Smyczek (LL)	(Japan) Tatsuma Ito	(Russia) Mikhail Youzhny [23]	(Argentina) Carlos Berlocq
(Spain) Daniel Gimeno Traver	(India) Somdev Devvarman (PR)	(France) Édouard Roger-Vasselin	(Slovakia) Lukáš Lacko
(Germany) Benjamin Becker	(Spain) Marcel Granollers [30]	(Uzbekistan) Denis Istomin	(United States) Rajeev Ram (Q)
(Canada) Jesse Levine	(Chinese Taipei) Lu Yen-hsun	(Germany) Florian Mayer [25]	(Portugal) João Sousa
(Japan) Go Soeda	(Australia) James Duckworth (WC)	(Finland) Jarkko Nieminen	(Colombia) Alejandro Falla
(Czech Republic) Lukáš Rosol	(Israel) Amir Weintraub (Q)	(Germany) Daniel Brands (Q)	(Russia) Nikolay Davydenko
1st round out
(France) Paul-Henri Mathieu	(Colombia) Santiago Giraldo	(Spain) Arnau Brugués Davi (Q)	(Serbia) Viktor Troicki
(Spain) Daniel Muñoz de la Nava (Q)	(Russia) Alex Bogomolov Jr.	(Italy) Flavio Cipolla	(Germany) Cedrik-Marcel Stebe (Q)
(Argentina) Juan Mónaco [11]	(Italy) Paolo Lorenzi	(Spain) Pablo Andújar	(Belgium) David Goffin
(Kazakhstan) Mikhail Kukushkin	(Italy) Fabio Fognini	(Germany) Julian Reister (Q)	(United States) Michael Russell
(Belgium) Olivier Rochus	(Croatia) Ivo Karlović	(Australia) John Millman (WC)	(Spain) Albert Ramos
(Australia) Matthew Ebden	(Romania) Adrian Ungur	(Belgium) Maxime Authom (Q)	(Romania) Victor Hănescu
(United States) Steve Johnson (Q)	(Poland) Łukasz Kubot	(Germany) Björn Phau	(Italy) Simone Bolelli
(Bulgaria) Grigor Dimitrov	(Belgium) Ruben Bemelmans (Q)	(Luxembourg) Gilles Müller	(Australia) Lleyton Hewitt
(France) Adrian Mannarino (Q)	(Slovenia) Aljaž Bedene	(Spain) Adrián Menéndez (Q)	(Slovenia) Grega Žemlja
(Argentina) Horacio Zeballos	(Netherlands) Igor Sijsling	(Spain) Guillermo García López	(Australia) Marinko Matosevic
(Italy) Filippo Volandri	(Spain) Tommy Robredo (PR)	(Spain) Rubén Ramírez Hidalgo	(Ukraine) Alexandr Dolgopolov [18]
(United States) Rhyne Williams (WC)	(Ukraine) Sergiy Stakhovsky	(Australia) John-Patrick Smith (WC)	(Netherlands) Robin Haase
(France) Michaël Llodra	(Australia) Luke Saville (WC)	(Australia) Benjamin Mitchell (WC)	(Brazil) Thomaz Bellucci [29]
(Germany) Tommy Haas [19]	(China) Wu Di (WC)	(France) Josselin Ouanna (WC)	(Spain) Albert Montañés
(Czech Republic) Jan Hájek	(United Kingdom) Jamie Baker (Q)	(Argentina) Guido Pella	(Belgium) Steve Darcis
(Slovakia) Martin Kližan [27]	(Argentina) Leonardo Mayer	(Israel) Dudi Sela (Q)	(France) Benoît Paire

Women's singles

Champion		Runner-up	
(Belarus) Victoria Azarenka [1]		(China) Li Na [6]	
Semifinals out
(United States) Sloane Stephens [29]		(Russia) Maria Sharapova [2]	
Quarterfinals out
(Russia) Svetlana Kuznetsova	(United States) Serena Williams [3]	(Poland) Agnieszka Radwańska [4]	(Russia) Ekaterina Makarova [19]
4th round out
(Russia) Elena Vesnina	(Denmark) Caroline Wozniacki [10]	(Russia) Maria Kirilenko [14]	(Serbia) Bojana Jovanovski
(Germany) Julia Görges [18]	(Serbia) Ana Ivanovic [13]	(Germany) Angelique Kerber [5]	(Belgium) Kirsten Flipkens
3rd round out
(United States) Jamie Hampton	(Italy) Roberta Vinci [16]	(Ukraine) Lesia Tsurenko (Q)	(Spain) Carla Suárez Navarro
(Japan) Ayumi Morita	(Belgium) Yanina Wickmayer [20]	(Japan) Kimiko Date-Krumm	(United Kingdom) Laura Robson
(Romania) Sorana Cîrstea [27]	(China) Zheng Jie	(Serbia) Jelena Janković [22]	(United Kingdom) Heather Watson
(United States) Madison Keys (WC)	(France) Marion Bartoli [11]	(Russia) Valeria Savinykh (Q)	(United States) Venus Williams [25]
2nd round out
(Greece) Eleni Daniilidou	(Thailand) Luksika Kumkhum (Q)	(United States) Varvara Lepchenko [21]	(Uzbekistan) Akgul Amanmuradova (Q)
(Croatia) Donna Vekić	(Russia) Daria Gavrilova (Q)	(Chinese Taipei) Hsieh Su-wei [26]	(Kazakhstan) Yulia Putintseva (Q)
(Spain) Garbiñe Muguruza	(Germany) Annika Beck	(Slovakia) Jana Čepelová	(China) Peng Shuai
(Israel) Shahar Pe'er	(Czech Republic) Lucie Šafářová [17]	(France) Kristina Mladenovic	(Czech Republic) Petra Kvitová [8]
(Belarus) Olga Govortsova	(Czech Republic) Kristýna Plíšková	(Switzerland) Romina Oprandi	(Australia) Samantha Stosur [9]
(Chinese Taipei) Chan Yung-jan (Q)	(Portugal) Maria João Koehler (Q)	(Kazakhstan) Ksenia Pervak	(Romania) Irina-Camelia Begu
(Czech Republic) Lucie Hradecká	(Austria) Tamira Paszek [30]	(France) Stéphanie Foretz Gacon	(Serbia) Vesna Dolonc (Q)
(Slovakia) Dominika Cibulková [15]	(Czech Republic) Klára Zakopalová [23]	(France) Alizé Cornet	(Japan) Misaki Doi
1st round out
(Romania) Monica Niculescu	(Czech Republic) Karolína Plíšková	(Sweden) Sofia Arvidsson	(Poland) Urszula Radwańska [31]
(Slovenia) Polona Hercog	(France) Caroline Garcia (WC)	(France) Mathilde Johansson	(Spain) Sílvia Soler Espinosa
(Germany) Sabine Lisicki	(Czech Republic) Andrea Hlaváčková	(United States) Lauren Davis	(Russia) Anastasia Pavlyuchenkova [24]
(Spain) Lara Arruabarrena Vecino	(Spain) Lourdes Domínguez Lino	(United States) Christina McHale	(Italy) Sara Errani [7]
(Romania) Edina Gallovits-Hall	(Slovakia) Magdaléna Rybáriková	(Georgia (country)) Anna Tatishvili	(Kazakhstan) Yaroslava Shvedova [28]
(Australia) Jarmila Gajdošová (WC)	(Hungary) Gréta Arn (Q)	(Canada) Rebecca Marino (PR)	(United States) Vania King
(Russia) Nadia Petrova [12]	(Russia) Alexandra Panova	(Spain) María Teresa Torró Flor	(Croatia) Mirjana Lučić-Baroni
(Romania) Simona Halep	(Hungary) Tímea Babos	(United States) Melanie Oudin	(Italy) Francesca Schiavone
(Kazakhstan) Sesil Karatantcheva	(France) Pauline Parmentier	(Australia) Sacha Jones (WC)	(United States) CoCo Vandeweghe
(Russia) Vera Dushevina	(Bulgaria) Tsvetana Pironkova	(China) Zhang Yuxuan (WC)	(Chinese Taipei) Chang Kai-chen
(Hungary) Melinda Czink	(Slovakia) Daniela Hantuchová	(Italy) Karin Knapp (Q)	(Sweden) Johanna Larsson
(Germany) Mona Barthel [32]	(Romania) Alexandra Cadanțu	(Netherlands) Arantxa Rus	(Australia) Bojana Bobusic (WC)
(Ukraine) Elina Svitolina	(Netherlands) Kiki Bertens	(Australia) Casey Dellacqua	(Switzerland) Stefanie Vögele
(Portugal) Michelle Larcher de Brito (Q)	(Italy) Camila Giorgi	(Australia) Olivia Rogowska (WC)	(Spain) Anabel Medina Garrigues
(Australia) Ashleigh Barty (WC)	(Luxembourg) Mandy Minella	(Russia) Nina Bratchikova	(South Africa) Chanelle Scheepers
(Kazakhstan) Galina Voskoboeva	(New Zealand) Marina Erakovic	(Croatia) Petra Martić	(Russia) Olga Puchkova

== Champions ==
=== Seniors ===
==== Men's singles ====
(Serbia) Novak Djokovic defeated (United Kingdom) Andy Murray, 6–7^{(2–7)}, 7–6^{(7–3)}, 6–3, 6–2

• It was Djokovic's 6th career Grand Slam singles title and his 4th title at the Australian Open (a record).

==== Women's singles ====
(Belarus) Victoria Azarenka defeated (China) Li Na, 4–6, 6–4, 6–3

• It was Azarenka's 2nd career Grand Slam singles title and her 2nd (consecutive) title at the Australian Open.

==== Men's doubles ====
(United States) Bob Bryan / (United States) Mike Bryan defeated (Netherlands) Robin Haase / (Netherlands) Igor Sijsling, 6–3, 6–4

• It was Bob and Mike's 13th career Grand Slam doubles title and their 6th title at the Australian Open. The victory also gave them sole possession of the all-time record for Grand Slam men's doubles titles by a team.

==== Women's doubles ====
(Italy) Sara Errani / (Italy) Roberta Vinci defeated (Australia) Ashleigh Barty / (Australia) Casey Dellacqua, 6–2, 3–6, 6–2

• It was Errani's 3rd career Grand Slam doubles title and her 1st title at the Australian Open.
• It was Vinci's 3rd career Grand Slam doubles title and her 1st title at the Australian Open.

==== Mixed doubles ====
(Australia) Jarmila Gajdošová / (Australia) Matthew Ebden defeated (Czech Republic) Lucie Hradecká / (Czech Republic) František Čermák, 6–3, 7–5

• It was Gajdošová's 1st career Grand Slam mixed doubles title.
• It was Ebden's 1st career Grand Slam mixed doubles title.

=== Juniors ===
==== Boys' singles ====
(Australia) Nick Kyrgios defeated (Australia) Thanasi Kokkinakis 7–6^{(7–4)}, 6–3

==== Girls' singles ====
(Croatia) Ana Konjuh defeated (Czech Republic) Kateřina Siniaková 6–3, 6–4

==== Boys' doubles ====
(Australia) Jay Andrijic / (Australia) Bradley Mousley defeated (Germany) Maximilian Marterer / (Austria) Lucas Miedler 6–3, 7–6^{(7–3)}

==== Girls' doubles ====
(Croatia) Ana Konjuh / (Canada) Carol Zhao defeated (Ukraine) Oleksandra Korashvili / (Czech Republic) Barbora Krejčíková 5–7, 6–4, [10–7]

=== Wheelchair tennis ===
==== Wheelchair men's singles ====
(Japan) Shingo Kunieda defeated (France) Stéphane Houdet 6–2, 6–0

==== Wheelchair women's singles ====
(Netherlands) Aniek van Koot defeated (Germany) Sabine Ellerbrock 6–1, 1–6, 7–5

==== Wheelchair quad singles ====
(United States) David Wagner defeated (United Kingdom) Andrew Lapthorne 2–6, 6–1, 6–4

==== Wheelchair men's doubles ====
(France) Michaël Jérémiasz / (Japan) Shingo Kunieda defeated (Sweden) Stefan Olsson / (Australia) Adam Kellerman 6–0, 6–1

==== Wheelchair women's doubles ====
(Netherlands) Jiske Griffioen / (Netherlands) Aniek van Koot defeated (United Kingdom) Lucy Shuker / (Netherlands) Marjolein Buis 6–4, 6–3

==== Wheelchair quad doubles ====
(United States) David Wagner / (United States) Nicholas Taylor defeated (United Kingdom) Andrew Lapthorne / (Sweden) Anders Hard 6–2, 6–3

== Players ==
=== Seniors ===
==== Singles seeds ====
Seeds and Rankings are as of 7 January 2013 and Points are as of 14 January 2013.

===== Men's singles =====
Sd	Rk	Player	Points	Points defending	Points won	New points	Status
1	1	(Serbia) Novak Djokovic	12,920	2,000	2,000	12,920	Champion, won in the final against (United Kingdom) Andy Murray [3]
2	2	(Switzerland) Roger Federer	10,265	720	720	10,265	Semifinals lost to (United Kingdom) Andy Murray [3]
3	3	(United Kingdom) Andy Murray	8,000	720	1,200	8,480	Runner-up, lost to (Serbia) Novak Djokovic [1]
4	5	(Spain) David Ferrer	6,505	360	720	6,865	Semifinals lost to (Serbia) Novak Djokovic [1]
5	6	(Czech Republic) Tomáš Berdych	4,680	360	360	4,680	Quarterfinals lost to (Serbia) Novak Djokovic [1]
6	7	(Argentina) Juan Martín del Potro	4,480	360	90	4,210	Third round lost to (France) Jérémy Chardy
7	8	(France) Jo-Wilfried Tsonga	3,375	180	360	3,555	Quarterfinals lost to (Switzerland) Roger Federer [2]
8	9	(Serbia) Janko Tipsarević	3,090	90	180	3,180	Fourth round lost to (Spain) Nicolás Almagro [10]
9	10	(France) Richard Gasquet	2,720	180	180	2,720	Fourth round lost to (France) Jo-Wilfried Tsonga [7]
10	11	(Spain) Nicolás Almagro	2,515	180	360	2,695	Quarterfinals lost to (Spain) David Ferrer [4]
11	12	(Argentina) Juan Mónaco	2,430	10	10	2,430	First round lost to (Russia) Andrey Kuznetsov
12	14	(Croatia) Marin Čilić	2,210	0	90	2,300	Third round lost to (Italy) Andreas Seppi [21]
13	15	(Canada) Milos Raonic	2,175	90	180	2,265	Fourth round lost to (Switzerland) Roger Federer [2]
14	16	(France) Gilles Simon	2,145	45	180	2,280	Fourth round lost to (United Kingdom) Andy Murray [3]
15	17	(Switzerland) Stanislas Wawrinka	1,900	90	180	1,990	Fourth round lost to (Serbia) Novak Djokovic [1]
16	18	(Japan) Kei Nishikori	1,870	360	180	1,690	Fourth round lost to (Spain) David Ferrer [4]
17	19	(Germany) Philipp Kohlschreiber	1,830	180	90	1,740	Third round lost to (Canada) Milos Raonic [13]
18	20	(Ukraine) Alexandr Dolgopolov	1,750	90	10	1,670	First round lost to (France) Gaël Monfils
19	21	(Germany) Tommy Haas	1,720	45	10	1,685	First round lost to (Finland) Jarkko Nieminen
20	22	(United States) Sam Querrey	1,650	45	90	1,695	Third round lost to (Switzerland) Stanislas Wawrinka [15]
21	23	(Italy) Andreas Seppi	1,595	10	180	1,765	Fourth round lost to (France) Jérémy Chardy
22	24	(Spain) Fernando Verdasco	1,445	10	90	1,525	Third round lost to (South Africa) Kevin Anderson
23	25	(Russia) Mikhail Youzhny	1,335	10	45	1,370	Second round lost to (Russia) Evgeny Donskoy
24	26	(Poland) Jerzy Janowicz	1,299	0	90	1,389	Third round lost to (Spain) Nicolás Almagro [10]
25	28	(Germany) Florian Mayer	1,215	0	45	1,260	Second round lost to (Lithuania) Ričardas Berankis (Q)
26	29	(Austria) Jürgen Melzer	1,177	10	90	1,257	Third round lost to (Czech Republic) Tomáš Berdych [5]
27	30	(Slovakia) Martin Kližan	1,175	20	10	1,165	First round lost to (Germany) Daniel Brands [Q]
28	31	(Cyprus) Marcos Baghdatis	1,115	45	90	1,160	Third round lost to (Spain) David Ferrer [4]
29	32	(Brazil) Thomaz Bellucci	1,112	45	10	1,077	First round lost to (Slovenia) Blaz Kavčič
30	33	(Czech Republic) Radek Štěpánek	1,110	10	90	1,190	Third round lost to (Serbia) Novak Djokovic [1]
31	34	(Spain) Marcel Granollers	1,125	45	45	1,125	Second round lost to (France) Jérémy Chardy
32	35	(France) Julien Benneteau	1,075	90	90	1,075	Third round lost to (Serbia) Janko Tipsarević [8]

===== Withdrawn players (men's singles) =====
Rank	Player	Points	Points defending	Points Won	New points	Withdrew due to
4	(Spain) Rafael Nadal	6,600	1,200	0	5,400	Stomach virus
13	(United States) John Isner	2,215	90	0	2,125	Knee injury
27	(United States) Mardy Fish	1,255	45	0	1,210	Health reasons

===== Women's singles =====
Sd	Rk	Player	Points	Points defending	Points won	New points	Status
1	1	(Belarus) Victoria Azarenka	10,325	2,000	2,000	10,325	Champion, won in the final against (China) Li Na [6]
2	2	(Russia) Maria Sharapova	10,045	1,400	900	9,545	Semifinals lost to (China) Li Na [6]
3	3	(United States) Serena Williams	9,750	280	500	9,970	Quarterfinals lost to (United States) Sloane Stephens [29]
4	4	(Poland) Agnieszka Radwańska	7,750	500	500	7,750	Quarterfinals lost to (China) Li Na [6]
5	5	(Germany) Angelique Kerber	5,575	160	280	5,695	Fourth round lost to (Russia) Ekaterina Makarova [19]
6	6	(China) Li Na	5,135	280	1,400	6,255	Runner-up, lost to (Belarus) Victoria Azarenka [1]
7	7	(Italy) Sara Errani	5,100	500	5	4,605	First round lost to (Spain) Carla Suárez Navarro
8	8	(Czech Republic) Petra Kvitová	5,085	900	100	4,285	Second round lost to (United Kingdom) Laura Robson
9	9	(Australia) Samantha Stosur	4,135	5	100	4,230	Second round lost to (China) Zheng Jie
10	10	(Denmark) Caroline Wozniacki	3,765	500	280	3,545	Fourth round lost to (Russia) Svetlana Kuznetsova
11	11	(France) Marion Bartoli	3,740	160	160	3,740	Third round lost to (Russia) Ekaterina Makarova [19]
12	12	(Russia) Nadia Petrova	3,040	100	5	2,945	First round lost to (Japan) Kimiko Date-Krumm
13	13	(Serbia) Ana Ivanovic	2,841	280	280	2,841	Fourth round lost to (Poland) Agnieszka Radwańska [4]
14	14	(Russia) Maria Kirilenko	2,570	160	280	2,690	Fourth round lost to (United States) Serena Williams [3]
15	15	(Slovakia) Dominika Cibulková	2,695	100	100	2,695	Second round lost to (Russia) Valeria Savinykh [Q]
16	16	(Italy) Roberta Vinci	2,525	100	160	2,585	Third round lost to (Russia) Elena Vesnina
17	17	(Czech Republic) Lucie Šafářová	2,065	5	100	2,160	Second round lost to (Serbia) Bojana Jovanovski
18	18	(Germany) Julia Görges	1,965	280	280	1,965	Fourth round lost to (China) Li Na [6]
19	19	(Russia) Ekaterina Makarova	1,881	500	500	1,881	Quarterfinals lost to (Russia) Maria Sharapova [2]
20	20	(Belgium) Yanina Wickmayer	1,680	5	160	1,835	Third round lost to (Russia) Maria Kirilenko [14]
21	21	(United States) Varvara Lepchenko	1,835	60	100	1,870	Second round lost to (Russia) Elena Vesnina
22	22	(Serbia) Jelena Janković	1,751	280	160	1,631	Third round lost to (Serbia) Ana Ivanovic [13]
23	23	(Czech Republic) Klára Zakopalová	1,705	5	100	1,800	Second round lost to (Belgium) Kirsten Flipkens
24	24	(Russia) Anastasia Pavlyuchenkova	1,690	100	5	1,595	First round lost to (Ukraine) Lesia Tsurenko [Q]
25	25	(United States) Venus Williams	1,650	0	160	1,810	Third round lost to (Russia) Maria Sharapova [2]
26	26	(Chinese Taipei) Hsieh Su-wei	1,636	40	100	1,696	Second round lost to (Russia) Svetlana Kuznetsova
27	27	(Romania) Sorana Cîrstea	1,565	160	160	1,565	Third round lost to (China) Li Na [6]
28	28	(Kazakhstan) Yaroslava Shvedova	1,583	2	5	1,586	First round lost to (Germany) Annika Beck
29	29	(United States) Sloane Stephens	1,666	100	900	2,466	Semifinals lost to (Belarus) Victoria Azarenka [1]
30	30	(Austria) Tamira Paszek	1,523	5	100	1,618	Second round lost to (United States) Madison Keys [WC]
31	31	(Poland) Urszula Radwańska	1,490	100	5	1,395	First round lost to (United States) Jamie Hampton
32	32	(Germany) Mona Barthel	1,380	160	5	1,225	First round lost to (Kazakhstan) Ksenia Pervak

==== Main draw wildcard entries ====
===== Men's singles =====
- (Australia) James Duckworth
- (Australia) John Millman
- (Australia) Ben Mitchell
- (France) Josselin Ouanna
- (Australia) Luke Saville
- (Australia) John-Patrick Smith
- (United States) Rhyne Williams
- (China) Wu Di

===== Women's singles =====
- (Australia) Ashleigh Barty
- (Australia) Bojana Bobusic
- (Australia) Jarmila Gajdošová
- (France) Caroline Garcia
- (Australia) Sacha Jones
- (United States) Madison Keys
- (Australia) Olivia Rogowska
- (China) Zhang Yuxuan

===== Men's doubles =====
- (Australia) Matthew Barton / (Australia) John Millman
- (Australia) Alex Bolt / (Australia) Greg Jones
- (Australia) James Duckworth / (Australia) Chris Guccione
- (Australia) Samuel Groth / (Australia) Matt Reid
- (Australia) Minos Kokkinakis / (Australia) Andrew Harris
- (Australia) John Peers / (Australia) John-Patrick Smith
- (Thailand) Danai Udomchoke / (Chinese Taipei) Jimmy Wang

===== Women's doubles =====
- (Australia) Monique Adamczak / (Australia) Stephanie Bengson
- (Australia) Ashleigh Barty / (Australia) Casey Dellacqua
- (Zimbabwe) Cara Black / (Australia) Anastasia Rodionova
- (Australia) Bojana Bobusic / (Australia) Jessica Moore
- (China) Han Xinyun / (China) Zhou Yimiao
- (Australia) Viktorija Rajicic / (Australia) Storm Sanders
- (Australia) Arina Rodionova / (Australia) Olivia Rogowska

===== Mixed doubles =====
- (Australia) Ashleigh Barty / (United States) Jack Sock
- (Zimbabwe) Cara Black / (Australia) Paul Hanley
- (Australia) Bojana Bobusic / (Australia) Chris Guccione
- (Australia) Casey Dellacqua / (Australia) John-Patrick Smith
- (Australia) Jarmila Gajdošová / (Australia) Matthew Ebden
- (Australia) Olivia Rogowska / (Australia) Marinko Matosevic
- (Australia) Samantha Stosur / (Australia) Luke Saville

==== Main draw qualifiers entries ====
===== Men's singles =====
1. (Belgium) Maxime Authom
2. (United Kingdom) Jamie Baker
3. (Belgium) Ruben Bemelmans
4. (Lithuania) Ričardas Berankis
5. (Russia) Alex Bogomolov Jr.
6. (Germany) Daniel Brands
7. (Spain) Arnau Brugués Davi
8. (United States) Steve Johnson
9. (France) Adrian Mannarino
10. (Spain) Adrián Menéndez
11. (Spain) Daniel Muñoz de la Nava
12. (United States) Rajeev Ram
13. (Germany) Julian Reister
14. (Israel) Dudi Sela
15. (Germany) Cedrik-Marcel Stebe
16. (Israel) Amir Weintraub

The following players received entry from a lucky loser spot:

1. (United States) Tim Smyczek

===== Women's singles =====
1. (Uzbekistan) Akgul Amanmuradova
2. (Hungary) Gréta Arn
3. (Serbia) Vesna Dolonc
4. (Russia) Vera Dushevina
5. (Russia) Daria Gavrilova
6. (Portugal) Maria João Koehler
7. (Italy) Karin Knapp
8. (Thailand) Luksika Kumkhum
9. (Portugal) Michelle Larcher de Brito
10. (Russia) Valeria Savinykh
11. (Ukraine) Lesia Tsurenko
12. (Chinese Taipei) Chan Yung-jan

== Protected ranking ==
The following players were accepted directly into the main draw using a protected ranking:

Men's singles

- (Spain) Tommy Robredo (50)
- (India) Somdev Devvarman (85)

Women's singles

- (Canada) Rebecca Marino (114)

== Withdrawals ==
The following players were accepted directly into the main tournament, but withdrew with injuries or personal reasons.

Men's singles

- ‡ (United States) Andy Roddick (39) → replaced by (Ukraine) Sergiy Stakhovsky (103)
- ‡ (United States) Mardy Fish (27) → replaced by (Canada) Jesse Levine (104)
- ‡ (Argentina) David Nalbandian (82) → replaced by (Australia) Matthew Ebden (105)
- ‡ (Estonia) Jürgen Zopp (89) → replaced by (Czech Republic) Jan Hájek (106)
- ‡ (Spain) Rafael Nadal (4) → replaced by (Kazakhstan) Mikhail Kukushkin (107)
- ‡ (United States) John Isner (14) → replaced by (United States) Tim Smyczek (LL)

Women's singles

- † (Estonia) Kaia Kanepi (19) → replaced by (Croatia) Donna Vekić (109)
- ‡ (Czech Republic) Barbora Záhlavová-Strýcová (90) → replaced by (Spain) Garbiñe Muguruza (110)
- ‡ (Czech Republic) Iveta Benešová (81) → replaced by (Kazakhstan) Sesil Karatantcheva (111)
- ‡ (Russia) Vera Zvonareva (96) → replaced by (Ukraine) Elina Svitolina (112)
- ‡ (Czech Republic) Petra Cetkovská (55) → replaced by (Czech Republic) Karolína Plíšková (113)
- ‡ (Italy) Flavia Pennetta (44) → replaced by (Slovakia) Jana Čepelová (114)
- ‡ (Canada) Aleksandra Wozniak (42) → replaced by (Canada) Rebecca Marino (114 PR)

† – not included on entry list
‡ – withdrew from entry list

Preceded by 2012 US Open	Grand Slam Tournaments	Succeeded by 2013 French Open
