= Minos Kokkinakis =

Greek Jehovah's Witness

Minos Kokkinakis (25 February 1909 , Sitia, Crete – 28 January 1999 Sitia) was a Greek member of Jehovah's Witnesses. He is most notable for his repeated clashes with Greece's ban on proselytism.

== Early life ==
A shopkeeper by trade, Kokkinakis originally was a Greek Orthodox Christian but became a Jehovah's Witness in 1936.

== Imprisonment ==
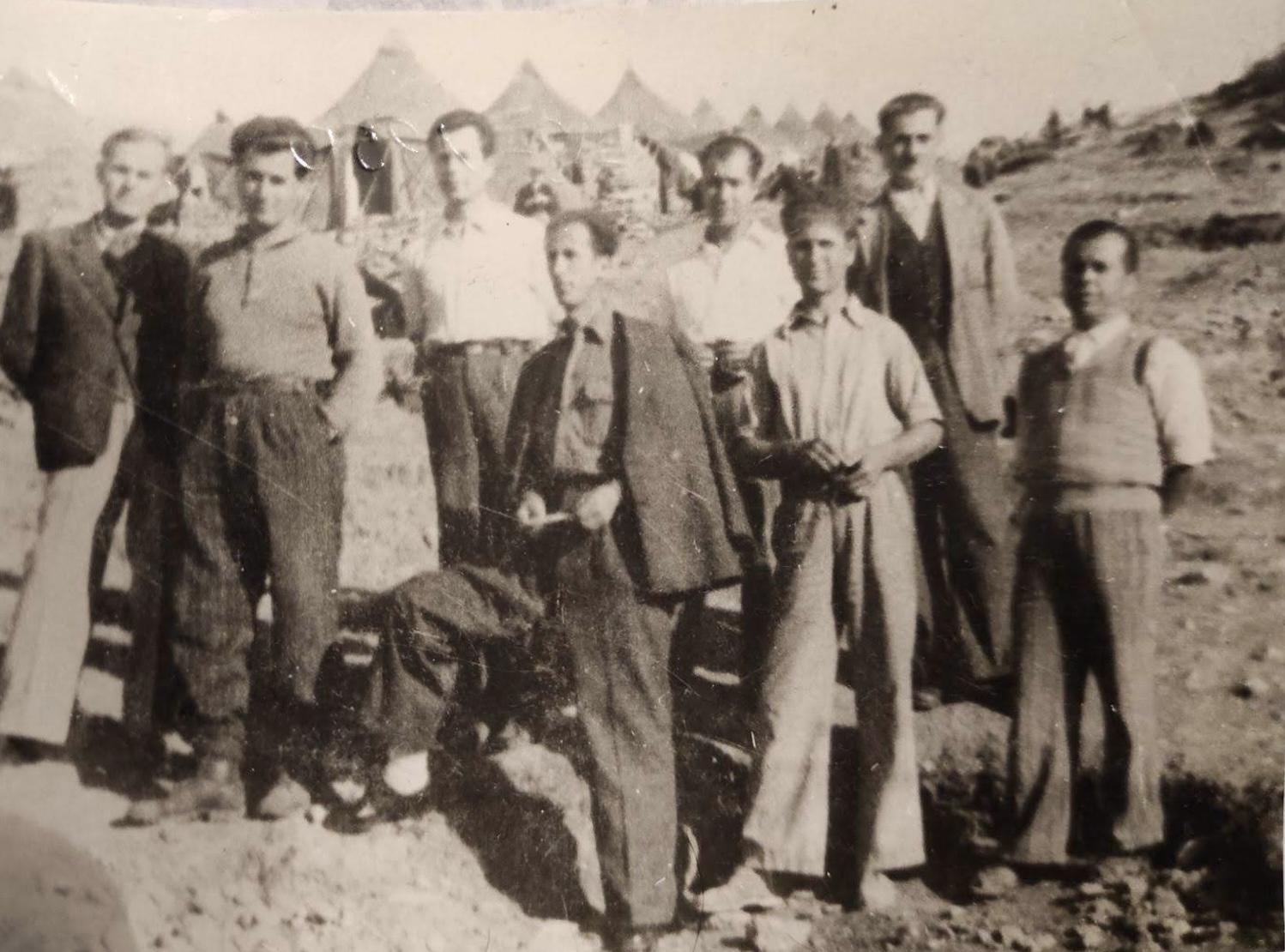
Minos Kokkinakis among other Jehovah's Witnesses in exile at Makronisos during 1949-1950. (He is fourth from the left.)

In 1938 he was the first Witness in Greece to be arrested for violating the law against proselytism which the government of dictator Ioannis Metaxas had just enacted under pressure from the Greek Orthodox Church. After his 1938 arrest, further short sentences followed in 1939 and 1940. During World War II, Kokkinakis was incarcerated in the military prison in Athens for more than 18 months. He was again sentenced in 1947 and 1949, when he was exiled to the notorious prison island of Makronisos, where torture was widespread. He was among forty Witnesses in a prison housing 14,000. After surviving the hardships of Makronisos, Kokkinakis was repeatedly arrested in the 1950s and 1960s for proselytism, one of hundreds of Witnesses to be imprisoned on such charges. All in all, he would be arrested more than sixty times, tried 18 times and spend a combined total of six and a half years in prison.

== 1986 imprisonment ==
In March 1986, when Kokkinakis and his wife Elissavet visited a home in Sitia on Crete, where they apparently tried to convert a woman whose husband was the cantor at a local Orthodox church. He informed the police, who arrested the couple. They were charged with proselytism and sentenced in the criminal court of Lasithi to four months' imprisonment. The court declared the defendants had intruded "on the religious beliefs of Orthodox Christians ... by taking advantage of their inexperience, their low intellect and their naivete." The Crete Court of Appeal later acquitted Elissavet but upheld her husband's conviction, although it reduced his prison sentence to three months.

== European court case ==
Kokkinakis persisted in his challenge to the ruling and after the Greek Supreme Court dismissed his appeal in April 1988 he took his case to the European Court. The petition was eventually accepted in February 1992 and the case was heard the following November in his presence. One of the nine judges declared Kokkinakis had been convicted "only for having shown such zeal, without any impropriety on his part."

In May 1993, the European Court of Human Rights in Strasbourg ruled his right to religious freedom had been violated and awarded him damages of three and a half million drachmas. "Fifty years of persecution were worth going through if only for this historic moment", Kokkinakis said. The landmark judgement was frequently cited in similar cases of proselytism in Greece, leading to acquittals not just of Jehovah's Witnesses but of other non Orthodox Greeks as well such as Pentecostal Christians and Buddhists.
