= 2013 Australian Open – Girls' singles =

Girls' singles
- 2013 Australian Open

Final
- Champion: (Croatia) Ana Konjuh
- Runner-up: (Czech Republic) Kateřina Siniaková
- Score: 6–3, 6–4

Events
Singles	men	women		boys	girls
Doubles	men	women	mixed	boys	girls
WC Singles	men	women	quad
WC Doubles	men	women	quad
Legends	men	women	mixed
- Australian Open

Ana Konjuh won the title, defeating Kateřina Siniaková in the final, 6–3, 6–4.

Taylor Townsend was the defending champion, but chose not to participate.

== Seeds ==
1. (Kazakhstan) Yulia Putintseva (withdrew)
2. (Czech Republic) Kateřina Siniaková (final)
3. (Croatia) Ana Konjuh (champion)
4. (Germany) Antonia Lottner (quarterfinals)
5. (Chinese Taipei) Hsu Ching-wen (third round)
6. (Canada) Carol Zhao (second round)
7. (Kazakhstan) Anna Danilina (third round)
8. (Belgium) Elise Mertens (quarterfinals)
9. (United States) Christina Makarova (first round)
10. (Estonia) Anett Kontaveit (semifinals)
11. (Brazil) Beatriz Haddad Maia (second round)
12. (Czech Republic) Barbora Krejčíková (quarterfinals)
13. (United Kingdom) Katy Dunne (third round)
14. (Canada) Erin Routliffe (first round)
15. (United States) Allie Kiick (third round)
16. (Ukraine) Oleksandra Korashvili (second round)
17. (Romania) Ilka Csöregi (first round)

== Qualifiers ==
1. (Poland) Zuzanna Maciejewska
2. (Australia) Danielle Wagland
3. (Australia) Stefani Stojic
4. (Ukraine) Olga Fridman
5. (Romania) Nicoleta-Cătălina Dascălu
6. (Australia) Eliza Long
7. (China) Xun Fangying
8. (New Zealand) Paige Mary Hourigan

== Main draw ==
Key

- Q = Qualifier
- WC = Wild card
- LL = Lucky loser
- Alt = Alternate
- ITF = ITF entry
- PR = Protected ranking
- SR = Special ranking
- SE = Special exempt
- JE = Junior exempt
- JR = Junior Accelerator Programme entrant
- CO = College Accelerator Programme entrant
- NG = Next Gen Accelerator Program entrant
- w/o = Walkover
- r = Retired
- d = Defaulted

=== Finals ===
Quarterfinals
(Russia) Elizaveta Kulichkova	6	7
8	(Belgium) Elise Mertens	4	5
3	(Croatia) Ana Konjuh	6	6
12	(Czech Republic) Barbora Krejčíková	4	4
10	(Estonia) Anett Kontaveit	6	6
4	(Germany) Antonia Lottner	1	3
(Latvia) Jeļena Ostapenko	2	2
2	(Czech Republic) Kateřina Siniaková	6	6

Semifinals
(Russia) Elizaveta Kulichkova	2	6	1
3	(Croatia) Ana Konjuh	6	3	6
10	(Estonia) Anett Kontaveit	2	3
2	(Czech Republic) Kateřina Siniaková	6	6

Final
3	(Croatia) Ana Konjuh	6	6
2	(Czech Republic) Kateřina Siniaková	3	4

=== Top half ===
==== Section 1 ====
First round
17	(Romania) Ilka Csöregi	4	3
(Russia) Elizaveta Kulichkova	6	6
Q	(Australia) Danielle Wagland	3	7	7
(China) You Xiaodi	6	5	5
Q	(Australia) Eliza Long	2	6^{4}
(Hong Kong) Katherine Ip	6	7^{7}
(Italy) Giulia Pairone	1	2
13	(United Kingdom) Katy Dunne	6	6
11	(Brazil) Beatriz Haddad Maia	6	6
Q	(New Zealand) Paige Mary Hourigan	3	1
(Turkey) İpek Soylu	3	6	6
Q	(Poland) Zuzanna Maciejewska	6	4	2
WC	(Australia) Kimberly Birrell	3	1
(Sweden) Rebecca Peterson	6	6
(Czech Republic) Dominika Paterová	0	2
8	(Belgium) Elise Mertens	6	6

Second round
(Russia) E Kulichkova	6	6
Q	(Australia) D Wagland	1	2
(Hong Kong) K Ip	4	4
13	(United Kingdom) K Dunne	6	6
11	(Brazil) B Haddad Maia	4	4
(Turkey) İ Soylu	6	6
(Sweden) R Peterson	4	6	3
8	(Belgium) E Mertens	6	2	6

Third round
(Russia) E Kulichkova	6	6
13	(United Kingdom) K Dunne	3	4
(Turkey) İ Soylu	2	0
8	(Belgium) E Mertens	6	6

Quarterfinals
(Russia) E Kulichkova	6	7
8	(Belgium) E Mertens	4	5

==== Section 2 ====
First round
3	(Croatia) Ana Konjuh	6	6
WC	(Australia) Ellen Perez	3	4
LL	(New Zealand) Bridget Liddell	1	1
(Japan) Mami Adachi	6	6
Q	(Australia) Stefani Stojic	6	2	7
(China) Xu Shilin	4	6	9
(Italy) Deborah Chiesa	3	4
15	(United States) Allie Kiick	6	6
12	(Czech Republic) Barbora Krejčíková	6	6
(Thailand) Kamonwan Buayam	0	4
WC	(Australia) Naiktha Bains	2	6	8
Q	(Ukraine) Olga Fridman	6	2	10
(France) Fiona Ferro	7^{9}	3	6
(South Africa) Madrie Le Roux	6^{7}	6	4
LL	(Australia) Brooke Rischbieth	6	5	4
6	(Canada) Carol Zhao	4	7	6

Second round
3	(Croatia) A Konjuh	7^{7}	6
(Japan) M Adachi	6^{5}	2
(China) S Xu	6	4	4
15	(United States) A Kiick	3	6	6
12	(Czech Republic) B Krejčíková	6	6
Q	(Ukraine) O Fridman	4	3
(France) F Ferro	6	6
6	(Canada) C Zhao	3	1

Third round
3	(Croatia) A Konjuh	6	6
15	(United States) A Kiick	0	1
12	(Czech Republic) B Krejčíková	6	6
(France) F Ferro	1	4

Quarterfinals
3	(Croatia) A Konjuh	6	6
12	(Czech Republic) B Krejčíková	4	4

=== Bottom half ===
==== Section 3 ====
First round
7	(Kazakhstan) Anna Danilina	6	7
(Japan) Hikari Yamamoto	2	5
(Italy) Camilla Rosatello	1	2
(United States) Jamie Loeb	6	6
(Slovakia) Natália Vajdová	6	6
(Australia) Lizette Cabrera	2	2
(United Kingdom) Harriet Dart	2	5
10	(Estonia) Anett Kontaveit	6	7
16	(Ukraine) Oleksandra Korashvili	6	7
Q	(Romania) Nicoleta-Cătălina Dascălu	2	5
(China) Sun Ziyue	4	6	6
WC	(Australia) Priscilla Hon	6	1	0
WC	(Australia) Sara Tomic	2	6	6
(Czech Republic) Gabriela Pantůčková	6	2	4
(Moldova) Aliona Bolsova	6^{2}	7^{7}	2
4	(Germany) Antonia Lottner	7^{7}	6^{4}	6

Second round
7	(Kazakhstan) A Danilina	6	5	6
(United States) J Loeb	3	7	1
(Slovakia) N Vajdová	6^{6}	0
10	(Estonia) A Kontaveit	7^{8}	6
16	(Ukraine) O Korashvili	7^{7}	4	2
(China) Z Sun	6^{4}	6	6
WC	(Australia) S Tomic	1	6	3
4	(Germany) A Lottner	6	2	6

Third round
7	(Kazakhstan) A Danilina	5	1
10	(Estonia) A Kontaveit	7	6
(China) Z Sun	6^{1}	1
4	(Germany) A Lottner	7^{7}	6

Quarterfinals
10	(Estonia) A Kontaveit	6	6
4	(Germany) A Lottner	1	3

==== Section 4 ====
First round
5	(Chinese Taipei) Hsu Ching-wen	6	4	6
WC	(Australia) Belinda Woolcock	1	6	3
(Belgium) Klaartje Liebens	6	1	6
Q	(China) Xun Fangying	3	6	0
WC	(Australia) Zoe Hives	5	6	1
(Egypt) Sandra Samir	7	2	6
(Latvia) Jeļena Ostapenko	6	6
9	(United States) Christina Makarova	0	2
14	(Canada) Erin Routliffe	6^{3}	3
(Serbia) Ivana Jorović	7^{7}	6
(Croatia) Adrijana Lekaj	6	2	6
(Indonesia) Aldila Sutjiadi	1	6	4
(New Zealand) Emily Fanning	3	3
WC	(Australia) Olivia Tjandramulia	6	6
(South Africa) Ilze Hattingh	6	2	4
2	(Czech Republic) Kateřina Siniaková	3	6	6

Second round
5	(Chinese Taipei) C-w Hsu	4	6	6
(Belgium) K Liebens	6	1	0
(Egypt) S Samir	3	4
(Latvia) J Ostapenko	6	6
(Serbia) I Jorović	6	3	4
(Croatia) A Lekaj	2	6	6
WC	(Australia) O Tjandramulia	0	2
2	(Czech Republic) K Siniaková	6	6

Third round
5	(Chinese Taipei) C-w Hsu	3	3
(Latvia) J Ostapenko	6	6
(Croatia) A Lekaj	0	3
2	(Czech Republic) K Siniaková	6	6

Quarterfinals
(Latvia) J Ostapenko	2	2
2	(Czech Republic) K Siniaková	6	6
