= 2013 Australian Open – Girls' doubles =

Girls' doubles
- 2013 Australian Open

Final
- Champions: (Croatia) Ana Konjuh (Canada) Carol Zhao
- Runners-up: (Ukraine) Oleksandra Korashvili (Czech Republic) Barbora Krejčíková
- Score: 5–7, 6–4, [10–7]

Events
Singles	men	women		boys	girls
Doubles	men	women	mixed	boys	girls
WC Singles	men	women	quad
WC Doubles	men	women	quad
Legends	men	women	mixed
- Australian Open

Gabrielle Andrews and Taylor Townsend were the defending champions, having won the event in 2012, but both chose not to defend their title.

Ana Konjuh and Carol Zhao won the tournament, defeating Oleksandra Korashvili and Barbora Krejčíková in the final, 5–7, 6–4, [10–7].

== Seeds ==
1. (Croatia) Ana Konjuh / (Canada) Carol Zhao (champions)
2. (Germany) Antonia Lottner / (Canada) Erin Routliffe (quarterfinals)
3. (United States) Allie Kiick / (Belgium) Elise Mertens (first round)
4. (United Kingdom) Katy Dunne / (United States) Christina Makarova (second round)
5. (Kazakhstan) Anna Danilina / (Russia) Elizaveta Kulichkova (semifinals)
6. (Ukraine) Oleksandra Korashvili / (Czech Republic) Barbora Krejčíková (final)
7. (France) Fiona Ferro / (Czech Republic) Kateřina Siniaková (second round)
8. (Italy) Camilla Rosatello / (Turkey) İpek Soylu (quarterfinals)

== Draw ==
Key

- Q = Qualifier
- WC = Wild card
- LL = Lucky loser
- Alt = Alternate
- ITF = ITF entry
- PR = Protected ranking
- SR = Special ranking
- SE = Special exempt
- JE = Junior exempt
- JR = Junior Accelerator Programme entrant
- CO = College Accelerator Programme entrant
- NG = Next Gen Accelerator Program entrant
- w/o = Walkover
- r = Retired
- d = Defaulted

=== Finals ===
Semifinals
1	(Croatia) Ana Konjuh (Canada) Carol Zhao	4	7^{7}	[10]
5	(Kazakhstan) Anna Danilina (Russia) Elizaveta Kulichkova	6	6^{5}	[4]
(Thailand) Kamonwan Buayam (China) Sun Ziyue	3	6	[7]
6	(Ukraine) Oleksandra Korashvili (Czech Republic) Barbora Krejčíková	6	2	[10]

Final
1	(Croatia) Ana Konjuh (Canada) Carol Zhao	5	6	[10]
6	(Ukraine) Oleksandra Korashvili (Czech Republic) Barbora Krejčíková	7	4	[7]

=== Top half ===
First round
1	(Croatia) Ana Konjuh (Canada) Carol Zhao	6	6
(Ukraine) Olga Fridman (Latvia) Jeļena Ostapenko	2	4
(Japan) Mami Adachi (Japan) Hikari Yamamoto	4	3
(Brazil) Beatriz Haddad Maia (Italy) Giulia Pairone	6	6
(Belgium) Klaartje Liebens (Egypt) Sandra Samir	3	1
WC	(Australia) Brooke Rischbieth (Australia) Sara Tomic	6	6
(United States) Jamie Loeb (Sweden) Rebecca Peterson	6	0	[5]
8	(Italy) Camilla Rosatello (Turkey) İpek Soylu	2	6	[10]
3	(United States) Allie Kiick (Belgium) Elise Mertens	6	2	[5]
WC	(Australia) Samantha Harris (Australia) Astra Sharma	1	6	[10]
(Romania) Ilka Csöregi (Serbia) Ivana Jorović	6	6
(Croatia) Adrijana Lekaj (Indonesia) Aldila Sutjiadi	2	1
(Australia) Naiktha Bains (Australia) Danielle Wagland	7	6
(Romania) Nicoleta-Cătălina Dascălu (Australia) Georgiana Ruhrig	5	3
(Czech Republic) Dominika Paterová (Slovakia) Natália Vajdová	6^{5}	1
5	(Kazakhstan) Anna Danilina (Russia) Elizaveta Kulichkova	7^{7}	6

Second round
1	(Croatia) A Konjuh (Canada) C Zhao	6	6
(Brazil) B Haddad Maia (Italy) G Pairone	3	1
WC	(Australia) B Rischbieth (Australia) S Tomic	3	5
8	(Italy) C Rosatello (Turkey) İ Soylu	6	7
WC	(Australia) S Harris (Australia) A Sharma	4	2
(Romania) I Csöregi (Serbia) I Jorović	6	6
(Australia) N Bains (Australia) D Wagland	3	2
5	(Kazakhstan) A Danilina (Russia) E Kulichkova	6	6

Quarterfinals
1	(Croatia) A Konjuh (Canada) C Zhao	3	6	[10]
8	(Italy) C Rosatello (Turkey) İ Soylu	6	2	[5]
(Romania) I Csöregi (Serbia) I Jorović	3	3
5	(Kazakhstan) A Danilina (Russia) E Kulichkova	6	6

Semifinals
1	(Croatia) A Konjuh (Canada) C Zhao	4	7^{7}	[10]
5	(Kazakhstan) A Danilina (Russia) E Kulichkova	6	6^{5}	[4]

=== Bottom half ===
First round
7	(France) Fiona Ferro (Czech Republic) Kateřina Siniaková	7^{7}	6
(China) Xu Shilin (China) Xun Fangying	6^{5}	1
(Italy) Alice Matteucci (Czech Republic) Gabriela Pantůčková	6	6
(Australia) Eliza Long (Australia) Stefani Stojic	2	1
(Thailand) Kamonwan Buayam (China) Sun Ziyue	6	6
WC	(Australia) Priscilla Hon (Australia) Olivia Tjandramulia	0	4
(New Zealand) Emily Fanning (Estonia) Anett Kontaveit	6	6^{5}	[3]
4	(United Kingdom) Katy Dunne (United States) Christina Makarova	3	7^{7}	[10]
6	(Ukraine) Oleksandra Korashvili (Czech Republic) Barbora Krejčíková	6	6
(Australia) Lizette Cabrera (Australia) Zoe Hives	1	4
(South Africa) Ilze Hattingh (South Africa) Madrie Le Roux	2	3
(Hong Kong) Katherine Ip (China) You Xiaodi	6	6
WC	(Australia) Ellen Perez (Australia) Belinda Woolcock	4	5
(United Kingdom) Harriet Dart (Chinese Taipei) Hsu Ching-wen	6	7
(Moldova) Aliona Bolsova (Italy) Deborah Chiesa	2	2
2	(Germany) Antonia Lottner (Canada) Erin Routliffe	6	6

Second round
7	(France) F Ferro (Czech Republic) K Siniaková	6	5	[5]
(Italy) A Matteucci (Czech Republic) G Pantůčková	1	7	[10]
(Thailand) K Buayam (China) Z Sun	6	6
4	(United Kingdom) K Dunne (United States) C Makarova	1	0
6	(Ukraine) O Korashvili (Czech Republic) B Krejčíková	6	7^{7}
(Hong Kong) K Ip (China) X You	1	6^{4}
(United Kingdom) H Dart (Chinese Taipei) C-w Hsu	3	2
2	(Germany) A Lottner (Canada) E Routliffe	6	6

Quarterfinals
(Italy) A Matteucci (Czech Republic) G Pantůčková	0	6^{4}
(Thailand) K Buayam (China) Z Sun	6	7^{7}
6	(Ukraine) O Korashvili (Czech Republic) B Krejčíková	6	6
2	(Germany) A Lottner (Canada) E Routliffe	1	2

Semifinals
(Thailand) K Buayam (China) Z Sun	3	6	[7]
6	(Ukraine) O Korashvili (Czech Republic) B Krejčíková	6	2	[10]
