= 2013 Australian Open – Men's doubles =

Tennis tournament

Men's doubles
- 2013 Australian Open

Final
- Champion: (United States) Bob Bryan (United States) Mike Bryan
- Runner-up: (Netherlands) Robin Haase (Netherlands) Igor Sijsling
- Score: 6–3, 6–4

Details
- Draw: 64
- Seeds: 16

Events
Singles	men	women		boys	girls
Doubles	men	women	mixed	boys	girls
WC Singles	men	women	quad
WC Doubles	men	women	quad
Legends	men	women	mixed
- Australian Open

Leander Paes and Radek Štěpánek were the defending champions but lost in the first round to Kevin Anderson and Jonathan Erlich.

Bob and Mike Bryan won the title by defeating Robin Haase and Igor Sijsling 6–3, 6–4 in the final. The win was their 13th Grand Slam men's doubles title, giving them sole possession of the all-time record for a doubles team. The twins had previously been tied with Australians John Newcombe and Tony Roche. Additionally, this was the Bryan's 5th consecutive Australian Open final and 9th in the past decade.

== Seeds ==
1. (United States) Bob Bryan / (United States) Mike Bryan (champions)
2. (India) Leander Paes / (Czech Republic) Radek Štěpánek (first round)
3. (Spain) Marcel Granollers / (Spain) Marc López (semifinals)
4. (Belarus) Max Mirnyi / (Romania) Horia Tecău (second round)
5. (India) Mahesh Bhupathi / (Canada) Daniel Nestor (third round)
6. (Pakistan) Aisam-ul-Haq Qureshi / (Netherlands) Jean-Julien Rojer (third round)
7. (Sweden) Robert Lindstedt / (Serbia) Nenad Zimonjić (second round)
8. (Poland) Mariusz Fyrstenberg / (Poland) Marcin Matkowski (first round)
9. (Austria) Alexander Peya / (Brazil) Bruno Soares (second round)
10. (Croatia) Ivan Dodig / (Brazil) Marcelo Melo (first round)
11. (Spain) David Marrero / (Spain) Fernando Verdasco (quarterfinals)
12. (India) Rohan Bopanna / (United States) Rajeev Ram (second round)
13. (Mexico) Santiago González / (United States) Scott Lipsky (first round)
14. (Austria) Julian Knowle / (Slovakia) Filip Polášek (first round)
15. (Czech Republic) František Čermák / (Slovakia) Michal Mertiňák (first round)
16. (United Kingdom) Jonathan Marray / (Brazil) André Sá (second round)

== Draw ==
Key

- Q = Qualifier
- WC = Wild card
- LL = Lucky loser
- Alt = Alternate
- ITF = ITF entry
- PR = Protected ranking
- SR = Special ranking
- SE = Special exempt
- JE = Junior exempt
- JR = Junior Accelerator Programme entrant
- CO = College Accelerator Programme entrant
- NG = Next Gen Accelerator Program entrant
- w/o = Walkover
- r = Retired
- d = Defaulted

=== Finals ===
Quarterfinals
1	(United States) Bob Bryan (United States) Mike Bryan	6	7
(Italy) Daniele Bracciali (Czech Republic) Lukáš Dlouhý	3	5
(Colombia) Juan Sebastián Cabal (Colombia) Robert Farah	6	4	3
(Italy) Simone Bolelli (Italy) Fabio Fognini	1	6	6
(Brazil) Thomaz Bellucci (France) Benoît Paire	3	1
3	(Spain) Marcel Granollers (Spain) Marc López	6	6
11	(Spain) David Marrero (Spain) Fernando Verdasco	4	6^{3}
(Netherlands) Robin Haase (Netherlands) Igor Sijsling	6	7^{7}

Semifinals
1	(United States) Bob Bryan (United States) Mike Bryan	6	4	6
(Italy) Simone Bolelli (Italy) Fabio Fognini	4	6	1
3	(Spain) Marcel Granollers (Spain) Marc López	5	4
(Netherlands) Robin Haase (Netherlands) Igor Sijsling	7	6

Final
1	(United States) Bob Bryan (United States) Mike Bryan	6	6
(Netherlands) Robin Haase (Netherlands) Igor Sijsling	3	4

=== Top half ===
==== Section 1 ====
First round
1	(United States) B Bryan (United States) M Bryan	7	6
(Austria) O Marach (Argentina) H Zeballos	5	3
(Czech Republic) L Rosol (Serbia) V Troicki	3	4
(Italy) F Cipolla (Italy) A Seppi	6	6
WC	(Australia) J Duckworth (Australia) C Guccione	3	7^{7}	6^{5}
WC	(Australia) S Groth (Australia) M Reid	6	6^{1}	7^{7}
(France) J Chardy (Poland) Ł Kubot	6	6
15	(Czech Republic) F Čermák (Slovakia) M Mertiňák	4	2
10	(Croatia) I Dodig (Brazil) M Melo	5	7^{7}	6^{5}
(Italy) D Bracciali (Czech Republic) L Dlouhý	7	6^{1}	7^{7}
WC	(Australia) A Bolt (Australia) G Jones	3	6	7^{7}
(Colombia) A Falla (Colombia) S Giraldo	6	2	6^{5}
(Thailand) Sa Ratiwatana (Thailand) So Ratiwatana	7^{7}	4	2
(Ukraine) S Stakhovsky (Russia) M Youzhny	6^{5}	6	6
WC	(Australia) J Peers (Australia) J-P Smith	6	6^{2}	6
8	(Poland) M Fyrstenberg (Poland) M Matkowski	4	7^{7}	1

Second round
1	(United States) B Bryan (United States) M Bryan	6	6
(Italy) F Cipolla (Italy) A Seppi	3	4
WC	(Australia) S Groth (Australia) M Reid	4	6	3
(France) J Chardy (Poland) Ł Kubot	6	3	6
(Italy) D Bracciali (Czech Republic) L Dlouhý	6	7^{7}
WC	(Australia) A Bolt (Australia) G Jones	2	6^{4}
(Ukraine) S Stakhovsky (Russia) M Youzhny	6	6
WC	(Australia) J Peers (Australia) J-P Smith	3	3

Third round
1	(United States) B Bryan (United States) M Bryan	6^{4}	6	6
(France) J Chardy (Poland) Ł Kubot	7^{7}	4	3
(Italy) D Bracciali (Czech Republic) L Dlouhý	7^{7}	1	7^{7}
(Ukraine) S Stakhovsky (Russia) M Youzhny	6^{3}	6	6^{4}

Quarterfinals
1	(United States) B Bryan (United States) M Bryan	6	7
(Italy) D Bracciali (Czech Republic) L Dlouhý	3	5

==== Section 2 ====
First round
4	(Belarus) M Mirnyi (Romania) H Tecău	6^{4}	7^{10}	6
(Philippines) TC Huey (United Kingdom) D Inglot	7^{7}	6^{8}	3
(Cyprus) M Baghdatis (Bulgaria) G Dimitrov	7^{8}	6
(Australia) M Ebden (United States) R Harrison	6^{6}	2
(Colombia) JS Cabal (Colombia) R Farah	3	6	7^{11}
WC	(Thailand) D Udomchoke (Chinese Taipei) J Wang	6	3	6^{9}
(Chinese Taipei) Y-h Lu (Japan) G Soeda	4	7^{10}	6
14	(Austria) J Knowle (Slovakia) F Polášek	6	6^{8}	3
12	(India) R Bopanna (United States) R Ram	6	6
WC	(Australia) N Kyrgios (Australia) T Kokkinakis	2	4
(Italy) S Bolelli (Italy) F Fognini	6	6
(Sweden) J Brunström (Denmark) F Nielsen	3	3
Alt	(Germany) A Begemann (Germany) M Emmrich	3	4
(Romania) V Hănescu (Slovakia) M Kližan	6	6
(Spain) P Andújar (Spain) G García-López	2	4
5	(India) M Bhupathi (Canada) D Nestor	6	6

Second round
4	(Belarus) M Mirnyi (Romania) H Tecău	6	3	2
(Cyprus) M Baghdatis (Bulgaria) G Dimitrov	3	6	6
(Colombia) JS Cabal (Colombia) R Farah	6	6
(Chinese Taipei) Y-h Lu (Japan) G Soeda	4	4
12	(India) R Bopanna (United States) R Ram	2	6^{3}
(Italy) S Bolelli (Italy) F Fognini	6	7^{7}
(Romania) V Hănescu (Slovakia) M Kližan	1	6^{8}
5	(India) M Bhupathi (Canada) D Nestor	6	7^{10}

Third round
(Cyprus) M Baghdatis (Bulgaria) G Dimitrov	6^{6}	6^{5}
(Colombia) JS Cabal (Colombia) R Farah	7^{8}	7^{7}
(Italy) S Bolelli (Italy) F Fognini	6	4	6
5	(India) M Bhupathi (Canada) D Nestor	3	6	3

Quarterfinals
(Colombia) JS Cabal (Colombia) R Farah	6	4	3
(Italy) S Bolelli (Italy) F Fognini	1	6	6

=== Bottom half ===
==== Section 3 ====
First round
6	(Pakistan) A-u-H Qureshi (Netherlands) J-J Rojer	6	6
(Belgium) D Goffin (Germany) S Stadler	3	1
(United States) N Monroe (Slovenia) G Žemlja	7^{8}	2	6^{6}
(Belgium) X Malisse (Belgium) D Norman	6^{6}	6	7^{8}
Alt	(Argentina) C Berlocq (United States) J Cerretani	2	1
(Brazil) T Bellucci (France) B Paire	6	6
(Austria) J Melzer (Belgium) O Rochus	3	2
9	(Austria) A Peya (Brazil) B Soares	6	6
13	(Mexico) S González (United States) S Lipsky	4	5
(United States) E Butorac (Australia) P Hanley	6	7
(Germany) M Kohlmann (Finland) J Nieminen	7	7
(United Kingdom) C Fleming (United Kingdom) J Murray	5	5
(Italy) P Lorenzi (Italy) P Starace	7^{7}	6
(Germany) B Becker (Germany) F Moser	6^{0}	3
(Germany) D Brown (Germany) C Kas	2	6	6^{7}
3	(Spain) M Granollers (Spain) M López	6	3	7^{9}

Second round
6	(Pakistan) A-u-H Qureshi (Netherlands) J-J Rojer	7^{7}	6
(Belgium) X Malisse (Belgium) D Norman	6^{5}	4
(Brazil) T Bellucci (France) B Paire	3	6	6
9	(Austria) A Peya (Brazil) B Soares	6	4	3
(United States) E Butorac (Australia) P Hanley	6	6
(Germany) M Kohlmann (Finland) J Nieminen	1	4
(Italy) P Lorenzi (Italy) P Starace	5	4
3	(Spain) M Granollers (Spain) M López	7	6

Third round
6	(Pakistan) A-u-H Qureshi (Netherlands) J-J Rojer	7^{7}	3	6^{5}
(Brazil) T Bellucci (France) B Paire	6^{5}	6	7^{7}
(United States) E Butorac (Australia) P Hanley	2	5
3	(Spain) M Granollers (Spain) M López	6	7

Quarterfinals
(Brazil) T Bellucci (France) B Paire	3	1
3	(Spain) M Granollers (Spain) M López	6	6

==== Section 4 ====
First round
7	(Sweden) R Lindstedt (Serbia) N Zimonjić	3	7	0
(France) M Llodra (France) N Mahut	6	5	0^{r}
(Russia) M Elgin (Uzbekistan) D Istomin	0	4
(France) J Benneteau (France) É Roger-Vasselin	6	6
(Poland) T Bednarek (Poland) J Janowicz	6	6^{2}	6
(United Kingdom) J Delgado (United Kingdom) K Skupski	0	7^{7}	3
(Spain) R Bautista-Agut (Spain) F López	6^{0}	0^{r}
11	(Spain) D Marrero (Spain) F Verdasco	7^{7}	0
16	(United Kingdom) J Marray (Brazil) A Sá	4	7	7^{7}
(Slovakia) L Lacko (Slovakia) I Zelenay	6	5	6^{5}
(Argentina) L Mayer (Spain) A Ramos	6^{3}	7^{8}	6^{6}
(Netherlands) R Haase (Netherlands) I Sijsling	7^{7}	6^{6}	7^{8}
WC	(Australia) M Barton (Australia) J Millman	3	6	7
(Spain) D Gimeno-Traver (Australia) M Matosevic	6	4	5
(South Africa) K Anderson (Israel) J Erlich	6	7
2	(India) L Paes (Czech Republic) R Štěpánek	3	5

Second round
7	(Sweden) R Lindstedt (Serbia) N Zimonjić	3	7^{7}	6^{5}
(France) J Benneteau (France) É Roger-Vasselin	6	6^{5}	7^{7}
(Poland) T Bednarek (Poland) J Janowicz	1	2
11	(Spain) D Marrero (Spain) F Verdasco	6	6
16	(United Kingdom) J Marray (Brazil) A Sá	4	6^{5}
(Netherlands) R Haase (Netherlands) I Sijsling	6	7^{7}
WC	(Australia) M Barton (Australia) J Millman	1	7^{7}	3
(South Africa) K Anderson (Israel) J Erlich	6	6^{5}	6

Third round
(France) J Benneteau (France) É Roger-Vasselin	7^{7}	4	4
11	(Spain) D Marrero (Spain) F Verdasco	6^{5}	6	6
(Netherlands) R Haase (Netherlands) I Sijsling	6	7
(South Africa) K Anderson (Israel) J Erlich	2	5

Quarterfinals
11	(Spain) D Marrero (Spain) F Verdasco	4	6^{3}
(Netherlands) R Haase (Netherlands) I Sijsling	6	7^{7}
