= Oleksandra Korashvili =

Ukrainian tennis player

Oleksandra Korashvili Олександра Корашвілі
- Full name: Oleksandra Nodariyivna Korashvili
- Country (sports): Ukraine
- Born: 1 March 1996 (age 29) Odesa, Ukraine
- Prize money: $53,101

Singles
- Career record: 144–113
- Career titles: 3 ITF
- Highest ranking: No. 414 (11 July 2016)

Doubles
- Career record: 128–75
- Career titles: 14 ITF
- Highest ranking: No. 202 (13 July 2015)

Oleksandra Nodariyivna Korashvili (Ukrainian: Олександра Нодаріївна Корашвілі; born 1 March 1996) is a Ukrainian former tennis player.

In her career, Korashvili won three singles and 14 doubles titles on the ITF Women's Circuit. In July 2016, she reached her best singles ranking of world No. 414. On 13 July 2015, she peaked at No. 202 in the WTA doubles rankings.

Korashvili made her WTA Tour debut at the 2012 Baku Cup, and alongside Barbora Krejčíková ended runners-up in the girls' doubles draw at the 2013 Australian Open.

== ITF Circuit finals ==
=== Singles: 7 (3 titles, 4 runner-ups) ===
Legend $25,000 tournaments $10,000 tournaments	Finals by surface Hard (1–1) Clay (2–3)

Result	No.	Date	Tournament	Surface	Opponent	Score
Loss	1.	Aug 2013	ITF Wanfercée-Baulet, Belgium	Clay	(Israel) Deniz Khazaniuk	3–6, 6–7^{(6)}
Win	1.	Nov 2014	ITF Sousse, Tunisia	Hard	(France) Manon Arcangioli	6–3, 6–2
Loss	2.	Sep 2015	ITF La Vall d'Uixó, Spain	Clay	(Spain) Estrella Cabeza Candela	6–7^{(5)}, 2–6
Win	2.	Nov 2015	ITF Nules, Spain	Clay	(Venezuela) Andrea Gámiz	6–4, 6–7^{(7)}, 7–6^{(3)}
Loss	3.	Apr 2016	ITF Sharm El Sheikh, Egypt	Hard	(United Kingdom) Manisha Foster	4–6, 6–7^{(4)}
Win	3.	Oct 2016	ITF Hammamet, Tunisia	Clay	(Argentina) Guadalupe Pérez Rojas	5–7, 6–2, 6–1
Loss	4.	Dec 2016	ITF Nules, Spain	Clay	(Spain) Olga Sáez Larra	2–6, 6–4, 2–6

=== Doubles: 28 (14 titles, 14 runner-ups) ===
Legend $50,000 tournaments $25,000 tournaments $15,000 tournaments $10,000 tournaments	Finals by surface Hard (7–5) Clay (7–9)

Result	No.	Date	Tournament	Surface	Partner	Opponents	Score
Win	1.	1 October 2012	ITF Bidar, India	Hard	(India) Rishika Sunkara	(Thailand) Nungnadda Wannasuk (China) Zhang Nannan	6–4, 7–5
Win	2.	25 February 2013	ITF Netanya, Israel	Hard	(Russia) Polina Leykina	(Russia) Natela Dzalamidze (Russia) Aminat Kushkhova	6–4, 6–2
Win	3.	31 March 2014	ITF Sharm El Sheikh, Egypt	Hard	(Croatia) Jana Fett	(Egypt) Ola Abou Zekry (Egypt) Mayar Sherif	6–4, 7–5
Loss	1.	20 October 2014	ITF Phuket, Thailand	Hard (i)	(Ukraine) Alyona Sotnikova	(Thailand) Nicha Lertpitaksinchai (Thailand) Peangtarn Plipuech	6–7^{(0)}, 6–2, [4–10]
Win	4.	10 November 2014	ITF Sousse, Tunisia	Hard	(Russia) Natela Dzalamidze	(United Kingdom) Harriet Dart (United Kingdom) Francesca Stephenson	6–3, 6–1
Win	5.	17 November 2014	ITF Sousse, Tunisia	Hard	(Russia) Natela Dzalamidze	(Bosnia and Herzegovina) Dea Herdželaš (Bosnia and Herzegovina) Jelena Simić	6–3, 6–1
Loss	2.	24 November 2014	ITF Sousse, Tunisia	Hard	(Serbia) Barbara Bonić	(Italy) Alice Balducci (Italy) Martina Caregaro	6–7^{(2)}, 4–6
Loss	3.	15 December 2014	Ankara Cup, Turkey	Hard (i)	(Bulgaria) Elitsa Kostova	(Georgia (country)) Ekaterine Gorgodze (Slovenia) Nastja Kolar	4–6, 6–7^{(5)}
Win	6.	30 March 2015	Osprey Challenger, United States	Clay	(Ukraine) Anhelina Kalinina	(Paraguay) Verónica Cepede Royg (Argentina) María Irigoyen	6–1, 6–4
Loss	4.	3 August 2015	ITF Moscow, Russia	Clay	(Ukraine) Valeriya Strakhova	(Russia) Natela Dzalamidze (Russia) Veronika Kudermetova	3–6, 3–6
Win	7.	10 August 2015	ITF Kazan, Russia	Clay	(Russia) Polina Leykina	(Russia) Anastasia Frolova (Uzbekistan) Polina Merenkova	w/o
Loss	5.	31 August 2015	ITF Barcelona, Spain	Clay	(Spain) Estrella Cabeza Candela	(Spain) Aliona Bolsova (Italy) Gaia Sanesi	3–6, 4–6
Win	8.	14 September 2015	ITF Bucha, Ukraine	Clay	(Ukraine) Alona Fomina	(Ukraine) Olga Ianchuk (Russia) Victoria Kan	6–4, 6–3
Win	9.	12 October 2015	ITF Melilla, Spain	Hard	(Spain) Estrella Cabeza Candela	(Spain) Irene Burillo Escorihuela (Australia) Isabelle Wallace	6–3, 6–1
Win	10.	2 November 2015	ITF Vinaròs, Spain	Clay	(Spain) Estrella Cabeza Candela	(Spain) Alicia Herrero Liñana (Russia) Ksenija Sharifova	6–2, 4–6, [10–5]
Loss	6.	9 November 2015	ITF Benicarló, Spain	Clay	(Romania) Ioana Loredana Roșca	(United Kingdom) Amanda Carreras (Italy) Alice Savoretti	3–6, 2–6
Loss	7.	16 November 2015	ITF Castellón, Spain	Clay	(Romania) Ioana Loredana Roșca	(Spain) Noelia Bouzó Zanotti (Spain) Olga Sáez Larra	3–6, 5–7
Loss	8.	2 April 2016	ITF Sharm El Sheikh, Egypt	Hard	(Russia) Margarita Lazareva	(Georgia (country)) Mariam Bolkvadze (Slovenia) Nastja Kolar	6–7^{(0)}, 5–7
Win	11.	9 April 2016	ITF Sharm El Sheikh, Egypt	Hard	(Russia) Margarita Lazareva	(Georgia (country)) Mariam Bolkvadze (France) Victoria Muntean	7–5, 6–3
Loss	9.	16 April 2016	ITF Sharm El Sheikh, Egypt	Hard	(United Kingdom) Katie Boulter	(Austria) Melanie Klaffner (Germany) Julia Wachaczyk	4–6, 6–2, [11–13]
Loss	10.	20 May 2016	ITF Caserta, Italy	Clay	(Russia) Maria Marfutina	(United Kingdom) Amanda Carreras (Italy) Alice Savoretti	7–6^{(9)}, 6–7^{(5)}, [6–10]
Win	12.	8 July 2016	ITF Getxo, Spain	Clay	(Romania) Ioana Loredana Roșca	(Argentina) Carla Lucero (France) Jessika Ponchet	6–0, 6–3
Loss	11.	31 July 2016	ITF Horb, Germany	Clay	(Bosnia and Herzegovina) Anita Husarić	(Netherlands) Richèl Hogenkamp (Netherlands) Lesley Kerkhove	1–6, 6–7^{(2)}
Win	13.	7 August 2016	ITF Bad Saulgau, Germany	Clay	(Romania) Irina Bara	(Germany) Nicola Geuer (Germany) Anna Zaja	7–5, 4–6, [10–4]
Win	14.	11 November 2016	ITF Vinaròs, Spain	Clay	(Romania) Ioana Loredana Roșca	(Venezuela) Andrea Gámiz (Ecuador) Charlotte Römer	6–4, 7–6^{(2)}
Loss	12.	18 November 2016	ITF Benicarló, Spain	Clay	(Australia) Isabelle Wallace	(United Kingdom) Amanda Carreras (Ecuador) Charlotte Römer	7–5, 3–6, [7–10]
Loss	13.	9 December 2016	ITF Nules, Spain	Clay	(Brazil) Laura Pigossi	(Ecuador) Charlotte Römer (Spain) Olga Sáez Larra	4–6, 2–6
Loss	14.	4 August 2017	ITF Ivano-Frankivsk, Ukraine	Clay	(Romania) Elena-Teodora Cadar	(Ukraine) Maryna Chernyshova (Ukraine) Veronika Kapshay	6–4, 2–6, [9–11]

== Junior Grand Slam finals ==
=== Girls' doubles ===
Result	Year	Championship	Surface	Partner	Opponents	Score
Loss	2013	Australian Open	Hard	(Czech Republic) Barbora Krejčíková	(Croatia) Ana Konjuh (Canada) Carol Zhao	7–5, 4–6, [7–10]
