= 2013 Australian Open – Men's singles =

Men's singles
- 2013 Australian Open

Final
- Champion: (Serbia) Novak Djokovic
- Runner-up: (United Kingdom) Andy Murray
- Score: 6–7^{(2–7)}, 7–6^{(7–3)}, 6–3, 6–2

Details
- Draw: 128 (16Q / 8WC)
- Seeds: 32

Events
| Singles | men | women | | boys | girls |
| Doubles | men | women | mixed | boys | girls |
| WC Singles | men | women | quad |
| WC Doubles | men | women | quad |
| Legends | men | women | mixed |
- Australian Open

Two-time defending champion Novak Djokovic defeated Andy Murray in the final, 6–7^{(2–7)}, 7–6^{(7–3)}, 6–3, 6–2 to win the men's singles tennis title at the 2013 Australian Open. It was his fourth Australian Open title and sixth major title overall. With the win, Djokovic became the first man in the Open Era to win the Australian Open three consecutive times.

Djokovic's five-set victory over Stanislas Wawrinka in the fourth round is considered by many observers to be one of the greatest matches ever. It was the first of three consecutive five-set matches the two would contest at the tournament; each time, the victor of said match would go on to win the title.

== Seeds ==
1. (Serbia) Novak Djokovic (champion)
2. (Switzerland) Roger Federer (semifinals)
3. (United Kingdom) Andy Murray (final)
4. (Spain) David Ferrer (semifinals)
5. (Czech Republic) Tomáš Berdych (quarterfinals)
6. (Argentina) Juan Martín del Potro (third round)
7. (France) Jo-Wilfried Tsonga (quarterfinals)
8. (Serbia) Janko Tipsarević (fourth round, retired because of a jarred heel)
9. (France) Richard Gasquet (fourth round)
10. (Spain) Nicolás Almagro (quarterfinals)
11. (Argentina) Juan Mónaco (first round)
12. (Croatia) Marin Čilić (third round)
13. (Canada) Milos Raonic (fourth round)
14. (France) Gilles Simon (fourth round)
15. (Switzerland) Stanislas Wawrinka (fourth round)
16. (Japan) Kei Nishikori (fourth round)

17. (Germany) Philipp Kohlschreiber (third round)
18. (Ukraine) Alexandr Dolgopolov (first round)
19. (Germany) Tommy Haas (first round)
20. (United States) Sam Querrey (third round)
21. (Italy) Andreas Seppi (fourth round)
22. (Spain) Fernando Verdasco (third round)
23. (Russia) Mikhail Youzhny (second round)
24. (Poland) Jerzy Janowicz (third round)
25. (Germany) Florian Mayer (second round)
26. (Austria) Jürgen Melzer (third round)
27. (Slovakia) Martin Kližan (first round)
28. (Cyprus) Marcos Baghdatis (third round)
29. (Brazil) Thomaz Bellucci (first round)
30. (Spain) Marcel Granollers (second round)
31. (Czech Republic) Radek Štěpánek (third round)
32. (France) Julien Benneteau (third round)

Click on the seed number of a player to go to their draw section.

== Draw ==
Key

- Q = Qualifier
- WC = Wild card
- LL = Lucky loser
- Alt = Alternate
- ITF = ITF entry
- PR = Protected ranking
- SR = Special ranking
- SE = Special exempt
- JE = Junior exempt
- JR = Junior Accelerator Programme entrant
- CO = College Accelerator Programme entrant
- NG = Next Gen Accelerator Program entrant
- w/o = Walkover
- r = Retired
- d = Defaulted

=== Finals ===
Quarterfinals
1 | (Serbia) Novak Djokovic | 6 | 4 | 6 | 6
5 | (Czech Republic) Tomáš Berdych | 1 | 6 | 1 | 4
4 | (Spain) David Ferrer | 4 | 4 | 7 | 7^{7} | 6
10 | (Spain) Nicolás Almagro | 6 | 6 | 5 | 6^{4} | 2
(France) Jérémy Chardy | 4 | 1 | 2
3 | (United Kingdom) Andy Murray | 6 | 6 | 6
7 | (France) Jo-Wilfried Tsonga | 6^{4} | 6 | 6^{4} | 6 | 3
2 | (Switzerland) Roger Federer | 7^{7} | 4 | 7^{7} | 3 | 6

Semifinals
1 | (Serbia) Novak Djokovic | 6 | 6 | 6
4 | (Spain) David Ferrer | 2 | 2 | 1
3 | (United Kingdom) Andy Murray | 6 | 6^{5} | 6 | 6^{2} | 6
2 | (Switzerland) Roger Federer | 4 | 7^{7} | 3 | 7^{7} | 2

Final
1 | (Serbia) Novak Djokovic | 6^{2} | 7^{7} | 6 | 6
3 | (United Kingdom) Andy Murray | 7^{7} | 6^{3} | 3 | 2

=== Top half ===
==== Section 1 ====
First round
1 | (Serbia) N Djokovic | 6 | 6 | 7
(France) P-H Mathieu | 2 | 4 | 5
(United States) R Harrison | 2 | 6 | 7 | 6
(Colombia) S Giraldo | 6 | 4 | 5 | 4
Q | (Spain) A Brugués-Davi | 3 | 2 | 4
(Spain) F López | 6 | 6 | 6
(Serbia) V Troicki | 7 | 6 | 3 | 3 | 5
31 | (Czech Republic) R Štěpánek | 5 | 4 | 6 | 6 | 7
20 | (United States) S Querrey | 6^{2} | 6 | 6 | 6
Q | (Spain) D Muñoz de la Nava | 7^{7} | 4 | 2 | 4
Q | (Russia) A Bogomolov Jr. | 6^{4} | 3 | 7^{7} | 6 | 2
(United States) B Baker | 7^{7} | 6 | 6^{0} | 3 | 6
(Germany) T Kamke | 6 | 6 | 6
(Italy) F Cipolla | 1 | 4 | 1
Q | (Germany) C-M Stebe | 2 | 4 | 3
15 | (Switzerland) S Wawrinka | 6 | 6 | 6

Second round
1 | (Serbia) N Djokovic | 6 | 6 | 6
(United States) R Harrison | 1 | 2 | 3
(Spain) F López | 2 | 2 | 4
31 | (Czech Republic) R Štěpánek | 6 | 6 | 6
20 | (United States) S Querrey | 6^{2} | 1
(United States) B Baker | 7^{7} | 1^{r}
(Germany) T Kamke | 3 | 6^{4} | 0^{r}
15 | (Switzerland) S Wawrinka | 6 | 7^{7} | 0

Third round
1 | (Serbia) N Djokovic | 6 | 6 | 7
31 | (Czech Republic) R Štěpánek | 4 | 3 | 5
20 | (United States) S Querrey | 6^{6} | 5 | 4
15 | (Switzerland) S Wawrinka | 7^{8} | 7 | 6

Fourth round
1 | (Serbia) N Djokovic | 1 | 7 | 6 | 6^{5} | 12
15 | (Switzerland) S Wawrinka | 6 | 5 | 4 | 7^{7} | 10

==== Section 2 ====
First round
11 | (Argentina) J Mónaco | 6^{3} | 1 | 1
(Russia) A Kuznetsov | 7^{7} | 6 | 6
(South Africa) K Anderson | 3 | 7^{7} | 6 | 6
(Italy) P Lorenzi | 6 | 6^{3} | 3 | 4
(Belgium) X Malisse | 6 | 6 | 6
(Spain) P Andújar | 3 | 1 | 2
(Belgium) D Goffin | 3 | 6 | 6 | 3 | 4
22 | (Spain) F Verdasco | 6 | 3 | 4 | 6 | 6
26 | (Austria) J Melzer | 6 | 6 | 6
(Kazakhstan) M Kukushkin | 1 | 1 | 2
(Italy) F Fognini | 0 | 6 | 4 | 6 | 1
(Spain) R Bautista-Agut | 6 | 2 | 6 | 3 | 6
Q | (Germany) J Reister | 6 | 6^{4} | 1 | 2
(France) G Rufin | 4 | 7^{7} | 6 | 6
(United States) M Russell | 3 | 5 | 3
5 | (Czech Republic) T Berdych | 6 | 7 | 6

Second round
(Russia) A Kuznetsov | 1 | 5 | 4
(South Africa) K Anderson | 6 | 7 | 6
(Belgium) X Malisse | 1 | 3 | 2
22 | (Spain) F Verdasco | 6 | 6 | 6
26 | (Austria) J Melzer | 6^{4} | 6 | 6^{3} | 6 | 6
(Spain) R Bautista-Agut | 7^{7} | 3 | 7^{7} | 3 | 2
(France) G Rufin | 2 | 2 | 4
5 | (Czech Republic) T Berdych | 6 | 6 | 6

Third round
(South Africa) K Anderson | 4 | 6 | 4 | 7^{7} | 6
22 | (Spain) F Verdasco | 6 | 3 | 6 | 6^{4} | 2
26 | (Austria) J Melzer | 3 | 2 | 2
5 | (Czech Republic) T Berdych | 6 | 6 | 6

Fourth round
(South Africa) K Anderson | 3 | 2 | 6^{13}
5 | (Czech Republic) T Berdych | 6 | 6 | 7^{15}

==== Section 3 ====
First round
4 | (Spain) D Ferrer | 6 | 6 | 6
(Belgium) O Rochus | 3 | 4 | 2
(Croatia) I Karlović | 4 | 6^{5} | 5
LL | (United States) T Smyczek | 6 | 7^{7} | 7
WC | (Australia) J Millman | 4 | 4 | 6 | 6 | 5
(Japan) T Ito | 6 | 6 | 3 | 0 | 7
(Spain) A Ramos | 7^{7} | 6^{4} | 4 | 6 | 3
28 | (Cyprus) M Baghdatis | 6^{0} | 7^{7} | 6 | 3 | 6
23 | (Russia) M Youzhny | 4 | 6^{0} | 6 | 7^{7} | 6
(Australia) M Ebden | 6 | 7^{7} | 2 | 6^{4} | 3
(Russia) E Donskoy | 6 | 6 | 6
(Romania) A Ungur | 4 | 4 | 2
Q | (Belgium) M Authom | 6 | 6^{5} | 6^{4} | 2
(Argentina) C Berlocq | 1 | 7^{7} | 7^{7} | 6
(Romania) V Hănescu | 7^{7} | 3 | 1 | 3
16 | (Japan) K Nishikori | 6^{5} | 6 | 6 | 6

Second round
4 | (Spain) D Ferrer | 6 | 7 | 4 | 6
LL | (United States) T Smyczek | 0 | 5 | 6 | 3
(Japan) T Ito | 6 | 3 | 2 | 2
28 | (Cyprus) M Baghdatis | 3 | 6 | 6 | 6
23 | (Russia) M Youzhny | 6 | 6^{4} | 2 | 6 | 3
(Russia) E Donskoy | 3 | 7^{7} | 6 | 3 | 6
(Argentina) C Berlocq | 6^{4} | 4 | 1
16 | (Japan) K Nishikori | 7^{7} | 6 | 6

Third round
4 | (Spain) D Ferrer | 6 | 6 | 6
28 | (Cyprus) M Baghdatis | 4 | 2 | 3
(Russia) E Donskoy | 6^{3} | 2 | 3
16 | (Japan) K Nishikori | 7^{7} | 6 | 6

Fourth round
4 | (Spain) D Ferrer | 6 | 6 | 6
16 | (Japan) K Nishikori | 2 | 1 | 4

==== Section 4 ====
First round
10 | (Spain) N Almagro | 7 | 6^{4} | 6 | 6^{6} | 6
Q | (United States) S Johnson | 5 | 7^{7} | 2 | 7^{8} | 2
(Spain) D Gimeno-Traver | 6^{4} | 6 | 6 | 4 | 6
(Poland) Ł Kubot | 7^{7} | 4 | 0 | 6 | 4
(Germany) B Phau | 3 | 2 | 3
PR | (India) S Devvarman | 6 | 6 | 6
(Italy) S Bolelli | 5 | 4 | 3
24 | (Poland) J Janowicz | 7 | 6 | 6
32 | (France) J Benneteau | 6 | 6 | 6
(Bulgaria) G Dimitrov | 4 | 2 | 4
(France) É Roger-Vasselin | 6 | 6^{5} | 2 | 7 | 11
Q | (Belgium) R Bemelmans | 3 | 7^{7} | 6 | 5 | 9
(Slovakia) L Lacko | 6 | 6 | 7^{7}
(Luxembourg) G Müller | 2 | 4 | 6^{3}
(Australia) L Hewitt | 6^{4} | 5 | 3
8 | (Serbia) J Tipsarević | 7^{7} | 7 | 6

Second round
10 | (Spain) N Almagro | 6 | 6 | 6
(Spain) D Gimeno-Traver | 4 | 1 | 2
PR | (India) S Devvarman | 7^{12} | 6 | 1 | 0 | 5
24 | (Poland) J Janowicz | 6^{10} | 3 | 6 | 6 | 7
32 | (France) J Benneteau | 4 | 7 | 7^{7} | 7^{7}
(France) É Roger-Vasselin | 6 | 5 | 6^{5} | 6^{5}
(Slovakia) L Lacko | 3 | 4 | 6 | 6 | 5
8 | (Serbia) J Tipsarević | 6 | 6 | 3 | 4 | 7

Third round
10 | (Spain) N Almagro | 7^{7} | 7^{7} | 6
24 | (Poland) J Janowicz | 6^{3} | 6^{4} | 1
32 | (France) J Benneteau | 6 | 4 | 6 | 4 | 3
8 | (Serbia) J Tipsarević | 3 | 6 | 2 | 6 | 6

Fourth round
10 | (Spain) N Almagro | 6 | 5
8 | (Serbia) J Tipsarević | 2 | 1^{r}

=== Bottom half ===
==== Section 5 ====
First round
6 | (Argentina) JM del Potro | 6 | 6 | 6
Q | (France) A Mannarino | 1 | 2 | 2
(Slovenia) A Bedene | 6 | 3 | 5 | 6^{1}
(Germany) B Becker | 4 | 6 | 7 | 7^{7}
(France) J Chardy | 7^{7} | 6^{3} | 6 | 6
Q | (Spain) A Menéndez | 6^{5} | 7^{7} | 2 | 1
(Slovenia) G Žemlja | 6^{6} | 6^{5} | 0^{r}
30 | (Spain) M Granollers | 7^{8} | 7^{7} | 1
21 | (Italy) A Seppi | 6 | 6 | 6
(Argentina) H Zeballos | 2 | 4 | 2
(Netherlands) I Sijsling | 6 | 3 | 4 | 2
(Uzbekistan) D Istomin | 4 | 6 | 6 | 6
(Spain) G García-López | 4 | 4 | 6 | 2
Q | (United States) R Ram | 6 | 6 | 3 | 6
(Australia) M Matosevic | 4 | 5 | 2
12 | (Croatia) M Čilić | 6 | 7 | 6

Second round
6 | (Argentina) JM del Potro | 6 | 6 | 6
(Germany) B Becker | 2 | 4 | 2
(France) J Chardy | 6 | 3 | 6 | 6
30 | (Spain) M Granollers | 3 | 6 | 1 | 2
21 | (Italy) A Seppi | 7^{7} | 5 | 6^{3} | 7^{7} | 6
(Uzbekistan) D Istomin | 6^{4} | 7 | 7^{7} | 6^{3} | 2
Q | (United States) R Ram | 5 | 2 | 4
12 | (Croatia) M Čilić | 7 | 6 | 6

Third round
6 | (Argentina) JM del Potro | 3 | 3 | 7^{7} | 6 | 3
(France) J Chardy | 6 | 6 | 6^{3} | 3 | 6
21 | (Italy) A Seppi | 6^{2} | 6 | 2 | 6 | 6
12 | (Croatia) M Čilić | 7^{7} | 3 | 6 | 4 | 2

Fourth round
(France) J Chardy | 5 | 6 | 6 | 6
21 | (Italy) A Seppi | 7 | 3 | 2 | 2

==== Section 6 ====
First round
14 | (France) G Simon | 2 | 6 | 6 | 6
(Italy) F Volandri | 6 | 3 | 2 | 2
PR | (Spain) T Robredo | 6^{5} | 7^{7} | 4 | 4
(Canada) J Levine | 7^{7} | 6^{2} | 6 | 6
(Chinese Taipei) Y-h Lu | 6 | 6 | 4 | 6
(Spain) R Ramírez Hidalgo | 2 | 1 | 6 | 1
(France) G Monfils | 6^{7} | 7^{7} | 6 | 6
18 | (Ukraine) A Dolgopolov | 7^{9} | 6^{4} | 3 | 3
25 | (Germany) F Mayer | 2 | 3 | 6 | 7^{14} | 6
WC | (United States) R Williams | 6 | 6 | 2 | 6^{12} | 1
Q | (Lithuania) R Berankis | 6 | 7^{7} | 7
(Ukraine) S Stakhovsky | 2 | 6^{4} | 5
(Portugal) J Sousa | 6 | 6 | 6
WC | (Australia) J-P Smith | 4 | 1 | 3
(Netherlands) R Haase | 3 | 1 | 3
3 | (United Kingdom) A Murray | 6 | 6 | 6

Second round
14 | (France) G Simon | 2 | 6 | 7^{7} | 6
(Canada) J Levine | 6 | 3 | 6^{4} | 2
(Chinese Taipei) Y-h Lu | 6^{5} | 6 | 6 | 1 | 6
(France) G Monfils | 7^{7} | 4 | 0 | 6 | 8
25 | (Germany) F Mayer | 2 | 3 | 1
Q | (Lithuania) R Berankis | 6 | 6 | 6
(Portugal) J Sousa | 2 | 2 | 4
3 | (United Kingdom) A Murray | 6 | 6 | 6

Third round
14 | (France) G Simon | 6 | 6 | 4 | 1 | 8
(France) G Monfils | 4 | 4 | 6 | 6 | 6
Q | (Lithuania) R Berankis | 3 | 4 | 5
3 | (United Kingdom) A Murray | 6 | 6 | 7

Fourth round
14 | (France) G Simon | 3 | 1 | 3
3 | (United Kingdom) A Murray | 6 | 6 | 6

==== Section 7 ====
First round
7 | (France) J-W Tsonga | 6 | 7 | 6
(France) M Llodra | 4 | 5 | 2
(Japan) G Soeda | 6^{4} | 6 | 6 | 6
WC | (Australia) L Saville | 7^{7} | 3 | 2 | 2
WC | (Australia) J Duckworth | 6 | 7^{10} | 4 | 5 | 8
WC | (Australia) B Mitchell | 4 | 6^{8} | 6 | 7 | 6
(Slovenia) B Kavčič | 6 | 6 | 6
29 | (Brazil) T Bellucci | 3 | 1 | 3
19 | (Germany) T Haas | 6^{3} | 6 | 3 | 6 | 6
(Finland) J Nieminen | 7^{7} | 4 | 6 | 4 | 8
(Croatia) I Dodig | 7 | 4 | 6 | 6
WC | (China) D Wu | 5 | 6 | 3 | 3
WC | (France) J Ouanna | 4 | 5 | 4
(Colombia) A Falla | 6 | 7 | 6
(Spain) A Montañés | 5 | 2 | 1
9 | (France) R Gasquet | 7 | 6 | 6

Second round
7 | (France) J-W Tsonga | 6 | 7^{7} | 6
(Japan) G Soeda | 3 | 6^{1} | 3
WC | (Australia) J Duckworth | 6 | 3 | 4 | 7^{7} | 8
(Slovenia) B Kavčič | 3 | 6 | 6 | 6^{3} | 10
(Finland) J Nieminen | 3 | 7^{7} | 3 | 7^{7} | 1
(Croatia) I Dodig | 6 | 6^{4} | 6 | 6^{4} | 6
(Colombia) A Falla | 3 | 2 | 2
9 | (France) R Gasquet | 6 | 6 | 6

Third round
7 | (France) J-W Tsonga | 6 | 6 | 6
(Slovenia) B Kavčič | 2 | 1 | 4
(Croatia) I Dodig | 6 | 3 | 6^{2} | 0
9 | (France) R Gasquet | 4 | 6 | 7^{7} | 6

Fourth round
7 | (France) J-W Tsonga | 6 | 3 | 6 | 6
9 | (France) R Gasquet | 4 | 6 | 3 | 2

==== Section 8 ====
First round
13 | (Canada) M Raonic | 3 | 6 | 6 | 7^{7}
(Czech Republic) J Hájek | 6 | 1 | 2 | 6^{0}
Q | (United Kingdom) J Baker | 6^{5} | 5 | 2
(Czech Republic) L Rosol | 7^{7} | 7 | 6
Q | (Israel) A Weintraub | 7^{7} | 7 | 6
(Argentina) G Pella | 6^{2} | 5 | 2
(Belgium) S Darcis | 2 | 3 | 4
17 | (Germany) P Kohlschreiber | 6 | 6 | 6
27 | (Slovakia) M Kližan | 3 | 6 | 3 | 4
Q | (Germany) D Brands | 6 | 3 | 6 | 6
(Australia) B Tomic | 6 | 6 | 6
(Argentina) L Mayer | 3 | 2 | 3
Q | (Israel) D Sela | 6 | 1 | 5 | 3
(Russia) N Davydenko | 3 | 6 | 7 | 6
(France) B Paire | 2 | 4 | 1
2 | (Switzerland) R Federer | 6 | 6 | 6

Second round
13 | (Canada) M Raonic | 7^{7} | 6 | 6
(Czech Republic) L Rosol | 6^{2} | 2 | 3
Q | (Israel) A Weintraub | 2 | 6^{4} | 4
17 | (Germany) P Kohlschreiber | 6 | 7^{7} | 6
Q | (Germany) D Brands | 7^{7} | 5 | 6^{3} | 6^{8}
(Australia) B Tomic | 6^{4} | 7 | 7^{7} | 7^{10}
(Russia) N Davydenko | 3 | 4 | 4
2 | (Switzerland) R Federer | 6 | 6 | 6

Third round
13 | (Canada) M Raonic | 7^{7} | 6 | 6
17 | (Germany) P Kohlschreiber | 6^{4} | 3 | 4
(Australia) B Tomic | 4 | 6^{5} | 1
2 | (Switzerland) R Federer | 6 | 7^{7} | 6

Fourth round
13 | (Canada) M Raonic | 4 | 6^{4} | 2
2 | (Switzerland) R Federer | 6 | 7^{7} | 6

| Preceded by 2012 US Open – Men's singles | Grand Slam men's singles | Succeeded by 2013 French Open – Men's singles |
