= 2013 Australian Open – Mixed doubles =

Mixed doubles
- 2013 Australian Open

Final
- Champions: (Australia) Jarmila Gajdošová (Australia) Matthew Ebden
- Runners-up: (Czech Republic) Lucie Hradecká (Czech Republic) František Čermák
- Score: 6–3, 7–5

Details
- Draw: 32
- Seeds: 8

Events
Singles	men	women		boys	girls
Doubles	men	women	mixed	boys	girls
WC Singles	men	women	quad
WC Doubles	men	women	quad
Legends	men	women	mixed
- Australian Open

Bethanie Mattek-Sands and Horia Tecău were the defending champions, but lost in the first round to Lucie Hradecká and František Čermák.

Jarmila Gajdošová and Matthew Ebden won their first mixed doubles title, defeating Hradecká and Čermák in the final, 6–3, 7–5. This would be Gajdošová's only Grand Slam title before her retirement in 2017.

== Seeds ==
1. (United States) Lisa Raymond / (United States) Mike Bryan (withdrew)
2. (Russia) Elena Vesnina / (India) Leander Paes (second round)
3. (India) Sania Mirza / (United States) Bob Bryan (quarterfinals)
4. (United States) Liezel Huber / (Belarus) Max Mirnyi (second round)
5. (Russia) Nadia Petrova / (India) Mahesh Bhupathi (quarterfinals)
6. (Germany) Anna-Lena Grönefeld / (Sweden) Robert Lindstedt (withdrew)
7. (Czech Republic) Andrea Hlaváčková / (Italy) Daniele Bracciali (second round)
8. (Germany) Julia Görges / (Canada) Daniel Nestor (withdrew)

== Draw ==
Key

- Q = Qualifier
- WC = Wild card
- LL = Lucky loser
- Alt = Alternate
- ITF = ITF entry
- PR = Protected ranking
- SR = Special ranking
- SE = Special exempt
- JE = Junior exempt
- JR = Junior Accelerator Programme entrant
- CO = College Accelerator Programme entrant
- NG = Next Gen Accelerator Program entrant
- w/o = Walkover
- r = Retired
- d = Defaulted

=== Finals ===
Semifinals
(Czech Republic) Květa Peschke (Poland) Marcin Matkowski	6	5	[7]
(Czech Republic) Lucie Hradecká (Czech Republic) František Čermák	3	7	[10]
(Kazakhstan) Yaroslava Shvedova (Uzbekistan) Denis Istomin	5	6^{5}
WC	(Australia) Jarmila Gajdošová (Australia) Matthew Ebden	7	7^{7}

Final
(Czech Republic) Lucie Hradecká (Czech Republic) František Čermák	3	5
WC	(Australia) Jarmila Gajdošová (Australia) Matthew Ebden	6	7

=== Top half ===
First round
Alt	(Czech Republic) V Uhlířová (Brazil) A Sá	3	5
(Czech Republic) K Peschke (Poland) M Matkowski	6	7
WC	(Australia) B Bobusic (Australia) C Guccione	4	7^{9}	[3]
(Spain) A Medina Garrigues (Brazil) B Soares	6	6^{7}	[10]
WC	(Australia) A Barty (United States) J Sock	3	3
(Chinese Taipei) S-w Hsieh (India) R Bopanna	6	6
Alt	(Slovakia) D Hantuchová (Italy) F Fognini	6	6
Alt	(South Africa) N Grandin (United States) R Ram	2	3
3	(India) S Mirza (United States) B Bryan	6	6
WC	(Australia) S Stosur (Australia) L Saville	2	2
(United States) A Spears (United States) S Lipsky	6	3	[10]
(United States) R Kops-Jones (Philippines) TC Huey	3	6	[7]
(United States) B Mattek-Sands (Romania) H Tecău	6	6^{5}	[8]
(Czech Republic) L Hradecká (Czech Republic) F Čermák	4	7^{7}	[10]
WC	(Australia) C Dellacqua (Australia) J-P Smith	6^{3}	6^{4}
7	(Czech Republic) A Hlaváčková (Italy) D Bracciali	7^{7}	7^{7}

Second round
(Czech Republic) K Peschke (Poland) M Matkowski	w/o
(Spain) A Medina Garrigues (Brazil) B Soares
(Chinese Taipei) S-w Hsieh (India) R Bopanna	6	7
Alt	(Slovakia) D Hantuchová (Italy) F Fognini	1	5
3	(India) S Mirza (United States) B Bryan	4	6	[10]
(United States) A Spears (United States) S Lipsky	6	1	[4]
(Czech Republic) L Hradecká (Czech Republic) F Čermák	6	7^{9}
7	(Czech Republic) A Hlaváčková (Italy) D Bracciali	4	6^{7}

Quarterfinals
(Czech Republic) K Peschke (Poland) M Matkowski	6	6
(Chinese Taipei) S-w Hsieh (India) R Bopanna	2	3
3	(India) S Mirza (United States) B Bryan	5	4
(Czech Republic) L Hradecká (Czech Republic) F Čermák	7	6

Semifinals
(Czech Republic) K Peschke (Poland) M Matkowski	6	5	[7]
(Czech Republic) L Hradecká (Czech Republic) F Čermák	3	7	[10]

=== Bottom half ===
First round
Alt	(China) Z Yan (Mexico) S González	6	6
(Austria) T Paszek (Austria) A Peya	2	2
(Kazakhstan) Y Shvedova (Uzbekistan) D Istomin	2	6	[10]
(United States) V King (Brazil) M Melo	6	4	[7]
(Spain) MJ Martínez Sánchez (Colombia) JS Cabal	4	3
(Spain) N Llagostera Vives (Spain) D Marrero	6	6
WC	(Zimbabwe) C Black (Australia) P Hanley	3	2
4	(United States) L Huber (Belarus) M Mirnyi	6	6
5	(Russia) N Petrova (India) M Bhupathi	6	6
(Australia) A Rodionova (Netherlands) J-J Rojer	4	2
(Slovenia) K Srebotnik (Serbia) N Zimonjić	6	6
WC	(Australia) O Rogowska (Australia) M Matosevic	3	3
(Germany) S Lisicki (Denmark) F Nielsen	6^{6}	3
WC	(Australia) J Gajdošová (Australia) M Ebden	7^{8}	6
(Sweden) S Arvidsson (Pakistan) A-u-H Qureshi	7^{10}	4	[7]
2	(Russia) E Vesnina (India) L Paes	6^{8}	6	[10]

Second round
Alt	(China) Z Yan (Mexico) S González	2	1
(Kazakhstan) Y Shvedova (Uzbekistan) D Istomin	6	6
(Spain) N Llagostera Vives (Spain) D Marrero	6	5	[10]
4	(United States) L Huber (Belarus) M Mirnyi	2	7	[4]
5	(Russia) N Petrova (India) M Bhupathi	3	6	[10]
(Slovenia) K Srebotnik (Serbia) N Zimonjić	6	2	[5]
WC	(Australia) J Gajdošová (Australia) M Ebden	6	6
2	(Russia) E Vesnina (India) L Paes	3	2

Quarterfinals
(Kazakhstan) Y Shvedova (Uzbekistan) D Istomin	6	7
(Spain) N Llagostera Vives (Spain) D Marrero	4	5
5	(Russia) N Petrova (India) M Bhupathi	3	6	[11]
WC	(Australia) J Gajdošová (Australia) M Ebden	6	3	[13]

Semifinals
(Kazakhstan) Y Shvedova (Uzbekistan) D Istomin	5	6^{5}
WC	(Australia) J Gajdošová (Australia) M Ebden	7	7^{7}
