= 2013 Australian Open – Women's doubles =

Women's doubles
- 2013 Australian Open

Final
- Champions: (Italy) Sara Errani (Italy) Roberta Vinci
- Runners-up: (Australia) Ashleigh Barty (Australia) Casey Dellacqua
- Score: 6–2, 3–6, 6–2

Details
- Draw: 64
- Seeds: 16

Events
Singles	men	women		boys	girls
Doubles	men	women	mixed	boys	girls
WC Singles	men	women	quad
WC Doubles	men	women	quad
Legends	men	women	mixed
- Australian Open

Russian pair Svetlana Kuznetsova and Vera Zvonareva were the defending champions, but Zvonareva decided not to participate due to injury. Kuznetsova partnered up with Yanina Wickmayer but they lost in the second round to Nuria Llagostera Vives and Zheng Jie.

Top seeds Sara Errani and Roberta Vinci won the title, defeating wild cards Ashleigh Barty and Casey Dellacqua in the final, 6–2, 3–6, 6–2.

== Seeds ==
1. (Italy) Sara Errani / (Italy) Roberta Vinci (champions)
2. (Czech Republic) Andrea Hlaváčková / (Czech Republic) Lucie Hradecká (second round)
3. (Russia) Maria Kirilenko / (United States) Lisa Raymond (second round)
4. (Russia) Ekaterina Makarova / (Russia) Elena Vesnina (semifinals)
5. (Russia) Nadia Petrova / (Slovenia) Katarina Srebotnik (third round)
6. (United States) Liezel Huber / (Spain) María José Martínez Sánchez (third round)
7. (Spain) Nuria Llagostera Vives / (China) Zheng Jie (quarterfinals)
8. (United States) Raquel Kops-Jones / (United States) Abigail Spears (second round)
9. (Germany) Anna-Lena Grönefeld / (Czech Republic) Květa Peschke (second round, withdrew)
10. (United States) Bethanie Mattek-Sands / (India) Sania Mirza (first round)
11. (United States) Vania King / (Kazakhstan) Yaroslava Shvedova (first round)
12. (United States) Serena Williams / (United States) Venus Williams (quarterfinals)
13. (Romania) Irina-Camelia Begu / (Romania) Monica Niculescu (third round)
14. (South Africa) Natalie Grandin / (Czech Republic) Vladimíra Uhlířová (third round)
15. (Chinese Taipei) Hsieh Su-wei / (China) Peng Shuai (third round)
16. (Slovakia) Daniela Hantuchová / (Spain) Anabel Medina Garrigues (first round)

== Draw ==
Key

- Q = Qualifier
- WC = Wild card
- LL = Lucky loser
- Alt = Alternate
- ITF = ITF entry
- PR = Protected ranking
- SR = Special ranking
- SE = Special exempt
- JE = Junior exempt
- JR = Junior Accelerator Programme entrant
- CO = College Accelerator Programme entrant
- NG = Next Gen Accelerator Program entrant
- w/o = Walkover
- r = Retired
- d = Defaulted

=== Finals ===
Quarterfinals
1	(Italy) Sara Errani (Italy) Roberta Vinci	3	7^{7}	7
12	(United States) Serena Williams (United States) Venus Williams	6	6^{1}	5
4	(Russia) Ekaterina Makarova (Russia) Elena Vesnina	1	7	6
(Spain) Sílvia Soler Espinosa (Spain) Carla Suárez Navarro	6	5	4
(Russia) Anastasia Pavlyuchenkova (Czech Republic) Lucie Šafářová	2	3
WC	(Australia) Ashleigh Barty (Australia) Casey Dellacqua	6	6
7	(Spain) Nuria Llagostera Vives (China) Zheng Jie	3	7	5
(United States) Varvara Lepchenko (China) Zheng Saisai	6	5	7

Semifinals
1	(Italy) Sara Errani (Italy) Roberta Vinci	6	6
4	(Russia) Ekaterina Makarova (Russia) Elena Vesnina	2	4
WC	(Australia) Ashleigh Barty (Australia) Casey Dellacqua	6	6
(United States) Varvara Lepchenko (China) Zheng Saisai	2	4

Final
1	(Italy) Sara Errani (Italy) Roberta Vinci	6	3	6
WC	(Australia) Ashleigh Barty (Australia) Casey Dellacqua	2	6	2

=== Top half ===
==== Section 1 ====
First round
1	(Italy) S Errani (Italy) R Vinci	7^{7}	6
(Sweden) S Arvidsson (Sweden) J Larsson	6^{3}	2
(Japan) R Fujiwara (Bosnia and Herzegovina) M Jugić-Salkić	1	4
(United States) J Craybas (South Africa) C Scheepers	6	6
(France) M Johansson (France) P Parmentier	7^{9}	4	7
(Netherlands) K Bertens (Germany) T Malek	6^{7}	6	5
(Australia) J Gajdošová (Czech Republic) K Zakopalová	1	4
15	(Chinese Taipei) S-w Hsieh (China) S Peng	6	6
12	(United States) S Williams (United States) V Williams	6	6
(Italy) C Giorgi (Switzerland) S Vögele	3	1
(Russia) V Dushevina (Belarus) O Govortsova	0	6	6
(Russia) N Bratchikova (Slovakia) J Husárová	6	4	2
(Russia) A Kudryavtseva (Israel) S Pe'er	0	3
(Croatia) D Jurak (Hungary) K Marosi	6	6
WC	(Australia) B Bobusic (Australia) J Moore	4	2
5	(Russia) N Petrova (Slovenia) K Srebotnik	6	6

Second round
1	(Italy) S Errani (Italy) R Vinci	6	6
(United States) J Craybas (South Africa) C Scheepers	2	0
(France) M Johansson (France) P Parmentier	2	4
15	(Chinese Taipei) S-w Hsieh (China) S Peng	6	6
12	(United States) S Williams (United States) V Williams	6	6
(Russia) V Dushevina (Belarus) O Govortsova	1	2
(Croatia) D Jurak (Hungary) K Marosi	1	6^{3}
5	(Russia) N Petrova (Slovenia) K Srebotnik	6	7^{7}

Third round
1	(Italy) S Errani (Italy) R Vinci	6	0	7
15	(Chinese Taipei) S-w Hsieh (China) S Peng	4	6	5
12	(United States) S Williams (United States) V Williams	6	6
5	(Russia) N Petrova (Slovenia) K Srebotnik	2	3

Quarterfinals
1	(Italy) S Errani (Italy) R Vinci	3	7^{7}	7
12	(United States) S Williams (United States) V Williams	6	6^{1}	5

==== Section 2 ====
First round
4	(Russia) E Makarova (Russia) E Vesnina	6	7
Alt	(Uzbekistan) A Amanmuradova (France) S Foretz Gacon	2	5
(Croatia) P Martić (France) K Mladenovic	6	4	6^{8}
(Luxembourg) M Minella (United States) M Moulton-Levy	2	6	7^{10}
(Russia) A Panova (Kazakhstan) G Voskoboeva	7^{7}	4	7
(Germany) M Barthel (France) A Cornet	6^{3}	6	5
(Czech Republic) E Birnerová (Switzerland) R Oprandi	2	4
13	(Romania) I-C Begu (Romania) M Niculescu	6	6
10	(United States) B Mattek-Sands (India) S Mirza	6^{4}	3
(Spain) S Soler Espinosa (Spain) C Suárez Navarro	7^{7}	6
(Chinese Taipei) K-c Chang (China) Z Yan	0	3
(Slovakia) D Cibulková (Kazakhstan) K Pervak	6	6
(Slovenia) A Klepač (Georgia (country)) A Tatishvili	6	6^{5}	5
WC	(China) X Han (China) Y Zhou	1	7^{7}	7
(Japan) M Doi (Japan) A Morita	2	6^{4}
6	(United States) L Huber (Spain) MJ Martínez Sánchez	6	7^{7}

Second round
4	(Russia) E Makarova (Russia) E Vesnina	6	6
(Luxembourg) M Minella (United States) M Moulton-Levy	4	4
(Russia) A Panova (Kazakhstan) G Voskoboeva	4	6	5
13	(Romania) I-C Begu (Romania) M Niculescu	6	2	7
(Spain) S Soler Espinosa (Spain) C Suárez Navarro	3
(Slovakia) D Cibulková (Kazakhstan) K Pervak	2^{r}
WC	(China) X Han (China) Y Zhou	6	6^{3}	3
6	(United States) L Huber (Spain) MJ Martínez Sánchez	1	7^{7}	6

Third round
4	(Russia) E Makarova (Russia) E Vesnina	4	6	6
13	(Romania) I-C Begu (Romania) M Niculescu	6	1	2
(Spain) S Soler Espinosa (Spain) C Suárez Navarro	7^{7}	2	6
6	(United States) L Huber (Spain) MJ Martínez Sánchez	6^{5}	6	4

Quarterfinals
4	(Russia) E Makarova (Russia) E Vesnina	1	7	6
(Spain) S Soler Espinosa (Spain) C Suárez Navarro	6	5	4

=== Bottom half ===
==== Section 3 ====
First round
8	(United States) R Kops-Jones (United States) A Spears	6	6
(Belgium) K Flipkens (Slovakia) M Rybáriková	1	2
(Russia) A Pavlyuchenkova (Czech Republic) L Šafářová	6	6
(Hungary) T Babos (United Kingdom) L Robson	2	4
(Serbia) J Janković (Croatia) M Lučić-Baroni	6	1	6
WC	(Australia) Ar Rodionova (Australia) O Rogowska	4	6	3
(New Zealand) M Erakovic (United Kingdom) H Watson	4	0
9	(Germany) A-L Grönefeld (Czech Republic) K Peschke	6	6
14	(South Africa) N Grandin (Czech Republic) V Uhlířová	6	6
WC	(Australia) V Rajicic (Australia) S Sanders	4	4
(Hungary) M Czink (Serbia) B Jovanovski	4	6	7^{7}
(Romania) S Halep (Netherlands) A Rus	6	2	6^{2}
(Slovenia) P Hercog (Italy) F Schiavone	2	4
WC	(Australia) A Barty (Australia) C Dellacqua	6	6
(Poland) A Rosolska (Thailand) T Tanasugarn	2	6	4
3	(Russia) M Kirilenko (United States) L Raymond	6	1	6

Second round
8	(United States) R Kops-Jones (United States) A Spears	4	2
(Russia) A Pavlyuchenkova (Czech Republic) L Šafářová	6	6
(Serbia) J Janković (Croatia) M Lučić-Baroni	w/o
9	(Germany) A-L Grönefeld (Czech Republic) K Peschke
14	(South Africa) N Grandin (Czech Republic) V Uhlířová	6	6
(Hungary) M Czink (Serbia) B Jovanovski	3	3
WC	(Australia) A Barty (Australia) C Dellacqua	6	6
3	(Russia) M Kirilenko (United States) L Raymond	4	4

Third round
(Russia) A Pavlyuchenkova (Czech Republic) L Šafářová	2
(Serbia) J Janković (Croatia) M Lučić-Baroni	1^{r}
14	(South Africa) N Grandin (Czech Republic) V Uhlířová	6^{3}	3
WC	(Australia) A Barty (Australia) C Dellacqua	7^{7}	6

Quarterfinals
(Russia) A Pavlyuchenkova (Czech Republic) L Šafářová	2	3
WC	(Australia) A Barty (Australia) C Dellacqua	6	6

==== Section 4 ====
First round
7	(Spain) N Llagostera Vives (China) J Zheng	6	6
(Chinese Taipei) H-c Chan (Chinese Taipei) Y-j Chan	3	3
(Russia) S Kuznetsova (Belgium) Y Wickmayer	6	2	6
(Germany) A Beck (Latvia) L Dekmeijere	1	6	1
WC	(Australia) M Adamczak (Australia) S Bengson	3	4
WC	(Zimbabwe) C Black (Australia) An Rodionova	6	6
(Japan) S Aoyama (United States) I Falconi	6	5	7^{7}
11	(United States) V King (Kazakhstan) Y Shvedova	3	7	6^{2}
16	(Slovakia) D Hantuchová (Spain) A Medina Garrigues	3	1
(Germany) J Görges (Australia) S Stosur	6	6
(United States) V Lepchenko (China) S Zheng	4	7^{7}	6
(Romania) S Cîrstea (Austria) T Paszek	6	6^{5}	3
(Japan) K Date-Krumm (Spain) A Parra Santonja	4	6	6
(Spain) L Arruabarrena Vecino (Spain) L Domínguez Lino	6	3	2
(Greece) E Daniilidou (United States) C McHale	4	3
2	(Czech Republic) A Hlaváčková (Czech Republic) L Hradecká	6	6

Second round
7	(Spain) N Llagostera Vives (China) J Zheng	6	6
(Russia) S Kuznetsova (Belgium) Y Wickmayer	3	3
WC	(Zimbabwe) C Black (Australia) An Rodionova	6	6
(Japan) S Aoyama (United States) I Falconi	4	4
(Germany) J Görges (Australia) S Stosur	5	6	5
(United States) V Lepchenko (China) S Zheng	7	3	7
(Japan) K Date-Krumm (Spain) A Parra Santonja	7	3	6
2	(Czech Republic) A Hlaváčková (Czech Republic) L Hradecká	5	6	3

Third round
7	(Spain) N Llagostera Vives (China) J Zheng	7	6
WC	(Zimbabwe) C Black (Australia) An Rodionova	5	2
(United States) V Lepchenko (China) S Zheng	3	6	7^{7}
(Japan) K Date-Krumm (Spain) A Parra Santonja	6	3	6^{5}

Quarterfinals
7	(Spain) N Llagostera Vives (China) J Zheng	3	7	5
(United States) V Lepchenko (China) S Zheng	6	5	7
