= 2014 Australian Open – Men's singles qualifying =

Men's singles qualifying
- 2014 Australian Open

Events
Singles	men	women		boys	girls
Doubles	men	women	mixed	boys	girls
WC Singles	men	women	quad
WC Doubles	men	women	quad
Legends	men	women	mixed

Qualification
Singles	men	women
- Australian Open

This article displays the qualifying draw for the Men's singles at the 2014 Australian Open. The draw was announced on 7 January 2014, with play commencing the next day.

== Seeds ==
1. (Germany) Dustin Brown (first round)
2. (Slovakia) Martin Kližan (qualifying competition, lucky loser)
3. (Belgium) David Goffin (withdrew because of a right quadriceps injury)
4. (United States) Denis Kudla (qualified)
5. (Serbia) Dušan Lajović (qualified)
6. (Argentina) Diego Schwartzman (first round)
7. (France) Stéphane Robert (qualifying competition, lucky loser)
8. (Canada) Frank Dancevic (qualified)
9. (Spain) Pere Riba (second round)
10. (Brazil) Thomaz Bellucci (qualified)
11. (France) Marc Gicquel (first round)
12. (France) Paul-Henri Mathieu (second round)
13. (United States) Rhyne Williams (qualified)
14. (Lithuania) Ričardas Berankis (qualified)
15. (United States) Rajeev Ram (second round)
16. (Germany) Peter Gojowczyk (qualified)
17. (Austria) Dominic Thiem (qualified)
18. (Romania) Marius Copil (second round)
19. (United States) Wayne Odesnik (qualified)
20. (United States) Alex Kuznetsov (qualifying competition)
21. (Canada) Peter Polansky (second round)
22. (Germany) Michael Berrer (qualified)
23. (Netherlands) Thiemo de Bakker (qualifying competition)
24. (Slovakia) Andrej Martin (qualifying competition)
25. (Belgium) Ruben Bemelmans (qualifying competition)
26. (United Kingdom) Daniel Evans (second round)
27. (France) Pierre-Hugues Herbert (qualifying competition)
28. (Italy) Potito Starace (qualifying competition)
29. (Chile) Paul Capdeville (second round)
30. (Japan) Tatsuma Ito (first round)
31. (Moldova) Radu Albot (first round)
32. (Japan) Yuichi Sugita (qualifying competition)

== Qualifiers ==
1. (Bosnia and Herzegovina) Damir Džumhur
2. (Austria) Dominic Thiem
3. (France) David Guez
4. (United States) Denis Kudla
5. (Serbia) Dušan Lajović
6. (China) Zhang Ze
7. (Germany) Michael Berrer
8. (Canada) Frank Dancevic
9. (United States) Wayne Odesnik
10. (Brazil) Thomaz Bellucci
11. (France) Vincent Millot
12. (Chinese Taipei) Jimmy Wang
13. (United States) Rhyne Williams
14. (Lithuania) Ričardas Berankis
15. (Slovenia) Blaž Rola
16. (Germany) Peter Gojowczyk

== Lucky losers ==
1. (Slovakia) Martin Kližan
2. (France) Stéphane Robert

== Draw ==
Key

- Q = Qualifier
- WC = Wild card
- LL = Lucky loser
- Alt = Alternate
- ITF = ITF entry
- PR = Protected ranking
- SR = Special ranking
- SE = Special exempt
- JE = Junior exempt
- JR = Junior Accelerator Programme entrant
- CO = College Accelerator Programme entrant
- NG = Next Gen Accelerator Program entrant
- w/o = Walkover
- r = Retired
- d = Defaulted

=== First qualifier ===
First round
1	(Germany) Dustin Brown	4	2
(Bosnia and Herzegovina) Damir Džumhur	6	6
(Australia) Matt Reid	6^{2}	4
(Belgium) Niels Desein	7^{7}	6
(Croatia) Kristijan Mesaroš	6	2	1
(Croatia) Ante Pavić	4	6	6
(Canada) Filip Peliwo	2	2
25	(Belgium) Ruben Bemelmans	6	6

Second round
(Bosnia and Herzegovina) Damir Džumhur	7^{7}	6
(Belgium) Niels Desein	6^{3}	1
(Croatia) Ante Pavić	4	2
25	(Belgium) Ruben Bemelmans	6	6

Qualifying competition
(Bosnia and Herzegovina) Damir Džumhur	7^{7}	6
25	(Belgium) Ruben Bemelmans	6^{1}	3

=== Second qualifier ===
First round
2	(Slovakia) Martin Kližan	6^{4}	7^{8}	6
(Germany) Andreas Beck	7^{7}	6^{6}	2
(Japan) Hiroki Kondo	1	2
WC	(France) Enzo Couacaud	6	6
(Germany) Matthias Bachinger	6	5	6
(Spain) Jordi Samper-Montaña	4	7	1
(South Africa) Rik de Voest	6	5	8
17	(Austria) Dominic Thiem	3	7	10

Second round
2	(Slovakia) Martin Kližan	7^{7}	6
WC	(France) Enzo Couacaud	6^{3}	3
(Germany) Matthias Bachinger	3	6	3
17	(Austria) Dominic Thiem	6	0	6

Qualifying competition
2	(Slovakia) Martin Kližan	2	5
17	(Austria) Dominic Thiem	6	7

=== Third qualifier ===
First round
Alt	(Poland) Grzegorz Panfil	3	6	3
(Italy) Lorenzo Giustino	6	4	6
(Japan) Hiroki Moriya	2	3
(France) David Guez	6	6
(Russia) Valery Rudnev	6	7^{7}
PR	(Ukraine) Sergei Bubka	4	6^{3}
(Japan) Yasutaka Uchiyama	6^{2}	3
32	(Japan) Yūichi Sugita	7^{7}	6

Second round
(Italy) Lorenzo Giustino	3	3
(France) David Guez	6	6
(Russia) Valery Rudnev	4	2
32	(Japan) Yūichi Sugita	6	6

Qualifying competition
(France) David Guez	4	6	6
32	(Japan) Yūichi Sugita	6	3	4

=== Fourth qualifier ===
First round
4	(United States) Denis Kudla	6	6
(United Kingdom) Daniel Cox	4	1
(Australia) Benjamin Mitchell	5	3
(Australia) John-Patrick Smith	7	6
(France) Axel Michon	6	3	11
WC	(Australia) Alex Bolt	4	6	9
(Greece) Theodoros Angelinos	6^{1}	4
20	(United States) Alex Kuznetsov	7^{7}	6

Second round
4	(United States) Denis Kudla	6	6
(Australia) John-Patrick Smith	2	2
(France) Axel Michon	3	6^{2}
20	(United States) Alex Kuznetsov	6	7^{7}

Qualifying competition
4	(United States) Denis Kudla	6	6
20	(United States) Alex Kuznetsov	4	2

=== Fifth qualifier ===
First round
5	(Serbia) Dušan Lajović	7^{7}	6
(United States) Tennys Sandgren	6^{5}	3
(Italy) Matteo Viola	5	4
(Croatia) Toni Androić	7	6
(France) Grégoire Burquier	2	6	2
(Chinese Taipei) Yang Tsung-hua	6	4	6
(Belgium) Kimmer Coppejans	6^{3}	7	4
18	(Romania) Marius Copil	7^{7}	5	6

Second round
5	(Serbia) Dušan Lajović	7^{7}	6
(Croatia) Toni Androić	6^{5}	4
(Chinese Taipei) Yang Tsung-hua	6	6
18	(Romania) Marius Copil	4	4

Qualifying competition
5	(Serbia) Dušan Lajović	6	6
(Chinese Taipei) Yang Tsung-hua	0	3

=== Sixth qualifier ===
First round
6	(Argentina) Diego Schwartzman	6	5	4
(China) Zhang Ze	3	7	6
WC	(Australia) Andrew Harris	6	7
(Italy) Simone Vagnozzi	1	5
(Ukraine) Illya Marchenko	6	6
(Czech Republic) Jaroslav Pospíšil	2	4
(Bosnia and Herzegovina) Mirza Bašić	4	6^{10}
21	(Canada) Peter Polansky	6	7^{12}

Second round
(China) Zhang Ze	6	6
WC	(Australia) Andrew Harris	2	4
(Ukraine) Illya Marchenko	3	6	6
21	(Canada) Peter Polansky	6	1	4

Qualifying competition
(China) Zhang Ze	7	6
(Ukraine) Illya Marchenko	5	3

=== Seventh qualifier ===
First round
7	(France) Stéphane Robert	6	6
(Russia) Alexander Kudryavtsev	3	4
WC	(Australia) Akira Santillan	0	5
(Belgium) Germain Gigounon	6	7
WC	(Australia) Blake Mott	3	6	2
(Spain) Enrique López Pérez	6	2	6
(Australia) Greg Jones	5	7	2
22	(Germany) Michael Berrer	7	5	6

Second round
7	(France) Stéphane Robert	6	7
(Belgium) Germain Gigounon	3	5
(Spain) Enrique López Pérez	2	2
22	(Germany) Michael Berrer	6	6

Qualifying competition
7	(France) Stéphane Robert	5	1
22	(Germany) Michael Berrer	7	6

=== Eighth qualifier ===
First round
8	(Canada) Frank Dancevic	6	6
(Belarus) Egor Gerasimov	2	2
(United States) Bobby Reynolds	6	7^{7}
(Slovakia) Miloslav Mečíř Jr.	4	6^{1}
(Portugal) Rui Machado	4	7^{7}	6
(Netherlands) Boy Westerhof	6	6^{2}	4
(India) Yuki Bhambri	3	6	2
28	(Italy) Potito Starace	6	1	6

Second round
8	(Canada) Frank Dancevic	6	1	7
(United States) Bobby Reynolds	4	6	5
(Portugal) Rui Machado	6	3	3
28	(Italy) Potito Starace	1	6	6

Qualifying competition
8	(Canada) Frank Dancevic	6^{4}	6	6
28	(Italy) Potito Starace	7^{7}	4	3

=== Ninth qualifier ===
First round
9	(Spain) Pere Riba	6	6
PR	(Spain) Óscar Hernández	1	1
(Spain) Adrián Menéndez Maceiras	6^{7}	6	6
(Croatia) Nikola Mektić	7^{9}	4	1
(Turkey) Marsel İlhan	6	6
(Australia) Matthew Barton	1	1
(Italy) Thomas Fabbiano	5	6^{1}
19	(United States) Wayne Odesnik	7	7^{7}

Second round
9	(Spain) Pere Riba	2	4
(Spain) Adrián Menéndez Maceiras	6	6
(Turkey) Marsel İlhan	1	6^{3}
19	(United States) Wayne Odesnik	6	7^{7}

Qualifying competition
(Spain) Adrián Menéndez Maceiras	3	6	6
19	(United States) Wayne Odesnik	6	2	8

=== Tenth qualifier ===
First round
10	(Brazil) Thomaz Bellucci	6	6
(France) Maxime Teixeira	4	0
(Austria) Martin Fischer	6	6
(Spain) Roberto Carballés Baena	1	3
(Switzerland) Henri Laaksonen	2	4
(Japan) Taro Daniel	6	6
WC	(Australia) Luke Saville	7^{9}	0	9
29	(Chile) Paul Capdeville	6^{7}	6	11

Second round
10	(Brazil) Thomaz Bellucci	4	6	10
(Austria) Martin Fischer	6	3	8
(Japan) Taro Daniel	6	6
29	(Chile) Paul Capdeville	0	4

Qualifying competition
10	(Brazil) Thomaz Bellucci	7	6
(Japan) Taro Daniel	5	2

=== Eleventh qualifier ===
First round
11	(France) Marc Gicquel	7^{8}	1	1
(Czech Republic) Jan Hernych	6^{6}	6	6
(France) Vincent Millot	6	6
WC	(Australia) Bradley Mousley	2	4
(Monaco) Benjamin Balleret	1	2
(Hungary) Márton Fucsovics	6	6
(Chinese Taipei) Huang Liang-chi	1	2
26	(United Kingdom) Daniel Evans	6	6

Second round
(Czech Republic) Jan Hernych	3	3
(France) Vincent Millot	6	6
(Hungary) Márton Fucsovics	6	6
26	(United Kingdom) Daniel Evans	4	1

Qualifying competition
(France) Vincent Millot	3	6	6
(Hungary) Márton Fucsovics	6	4	1

=== Twelfth qualifier ===
First round
12	(France) Paul-Henri Mathieu	6	6
WC	(Australia) Marc Polmans	2	1
(Chinese Taipei) Jimmy Wang	7^{7}	7
(Republic of Ireland) James McGee	6^{2}	5
(Spain) José Checa Calvo	1	2
(Slovakia) Norbert Gombos	6	6
PR	(United States) Daniel Kosakowski	6	2	6
30	(Japan) Tatsuma Ito	3	6	4

Second round
12	(France) Paul-Henri Mathieu	4	1
(Chinese Taipei) Jimmy Wang	6	6
(Slovakia) Norbert Gombos	3	2
PR	(United States) Daniel Kosakowski	6	6

Qualifying competition
(Chinese Taipei) Jimmy Wang	7^{9}	6
PR	(United States) Daniel Kosakowski	6^{7}	3

=== Thirteenth qualifier ===
First round
13	(United States) Rhyne Williams	7^{7}	2	6
(Canada) Steven Diez	6^{3}	6	4
(Tunisia) Malek Jaziri	3	6	7
(United States) Austin Krajicek	6	4	9
(Italy) Alessandro Giannessi	6	6
(Egypt) Mohamed Safwat	4	4
WC	(Australia) Andrew Whittington	5	4
23	(Netherlands) Thiemo de Bakker	7	6

Second round
13	(United States) Rhyne Williams	7^{7}	7^{7}
(United States) Austin Krajicek	6^{4}	6^{4}
(Italy) Alessandro Giannessi	3	6^{8}
23	(Netherlands) Thiemo de Bakker	6	7^{10}

Qualifying competition
13	(United States) Rhyne Williams	2	7^{8}	6
23	(Netherlands) Thiemo de Bakker	6	6^{6}	2

=== Fourteenth qualifier ===
First round
14	(Lithuania) Ričardas Berankis	6	6
(Italy) Gianluca Naso	2	3
(Ukraine) Denys Molchanov	4	4
(Brazil) André Ghem	6	6
(Spain) Gerard Granollers	1	2
(Serbia) Ilija Bozoljac	6	6
(Switzerland) Marco Chiudinelli	3	6	1
24	(Slovakia) Andrej Martin	6	3	6

Second round
14	(Lithuania) Ričardas Berankis	6	6
(Brazil) André Ghem	4	3
(Serbia) Ilija Bozoljac	6	4	5
24	(Slovakia) Andrej Martin	0	6	7

Qualifying competition
14	(Lithuania) Ričardas Berankis	6	6
24	(Slovakia) Andrej Martin	3	1

=== Fifteenth qualifier ===
First round
15	(United States) Rajeev Ram	6	7
(Italy) Marco Cecchinato	1	5
(Italy) Alessio di Mauro	6^{2}	4
(Slovenia) Blaž Rola	7^{7}	6
(United Kingdom) James Ward	6^{2}	4
(Italy) Andrea Arnaboldi	7^{7}	6
(Israel) Amir Weintraub	7^{12}	4	6
27	(France) Pierre-Hugues Herbert	6^{10}	6	8

Second round
15	(United States) Rajeev Ram	3	6	3
(Slovenia) Blaž Rola	6	3	6
(Italy) Andrea Arnaboldi	6	6^{3}	2
27	(France) Pierre-Hugues Herbert	4	7^{7}	6

Qualifying competition
(Slovenia) Blaž Rola	6	6
27	(France) Pierre-Hugues Herbert	1	4

=== Sixteenth qualifier ===
First round
16	(Germany) Peter Gojowczyk	6	6
(France) Albano Olivetti	4	2
(Czech Republic) Jan Mertl	4	5
(Germany) Mischa Zverev	6	7
(Serbia) Filip Krajinović	6^{2}	3
(Italy) Flavio Cipolla	7^{7}	6
(Russia) Konstantin Kravchuk	7^{7}	4	6
31	(Moldova) Radu Albot	6^{3}	6	3

Second round
16	(Germany) Peter Gojowczyk	6	6
(Germany) Mischa Zverev	3	1
(Italy) Flavio Cipolla	4	6	6
(Russia) Konstantin Kravchuk	6	2	1

Qualifying competition
16	(Germany) Peter Gojowczyk	6	6
(Italy) Flavio Cipolla	2	3
