= 2014 Australian Open – Women's singles qualifying =

Tennis qualifying draw

Women's singles qualifying
- 2014 Australian Open

Events
Singles	men	women		boys	girls
Doubles	men	women	mixed	boys	girls
WC Singles	men	women	quad
WC Doubles	men	women	quad
Legends	men	women	mixed

Qualification
Singles	men	women
- Australian Open

This article displays the qualifying draw for the women's singles tournament at the 2014 Australian Open. The draw was made on 8 January 2014.

== Seeds ==
1. (Canada) Sharon Fichman (first round)
2. (United States) Coco Vandeweghe (first round)
3. (United Kingdom) Johanna Konta (second round)
4. (Germany) Anna-Lena Friedsam (first round)
5. (Poland) Katarzyna Piter (qualified)
6. (Ukraine) Maryna Zanevska (first round)
7. (United Kingdom) Heather Watson (qualified)
8. (Poland) Magda Linette (second round)
9. (Czech Republic) Kristýna Plíšková (second round)
10. (Russia) Vera Dushevina (qualifying competition)
11. (United States) Shelby Rogers (second round)
12. (Georgia (country)) Anna Tatishvili (qualified)
13. (France) Claire Feuerstein (qualifying competition)
14. (Romania) Irina-Camelia Begu (qualified)
15. (Russia) Alexandra Panova (second round)
16. (Sweden) Sofia Arvidsson (first round)
17. (Czech Republic) Andrea Hlaváčková (second round)
18. (France) Mathilde Johansson (second round)
19. (Russia) Marta Sirotkina (qualifying competition)
20. (Portugal) Maria João Koehler (first round)
21. (Russia) Olga Puchkova (first round)
22. (Kazakhstan) Sesil Karatantcheva (first round)
23. (United States) Irina Falconi (qualifying competition; Lucky loser)
24. (Belgium) An-Sophie Mestach (second round)

== Qualifiers ==
1. (Switzerland) Belinda Bencic
2. (Germany) Carina Witthöft
3. (Croatia) Ana Konjuh
4. (Kazakhstan) Zarina Diyas
5. (Poland) Katarzyna Piter
6. (Russia) Alla Kudryavtseva
7. (United Kingdom) Heather Watson
8. (Czech Republic) Lucie Hradecká
9. (Czech Republic) Kateřina Siniaková
10. (China) Duan Yingying
11. (Romania) Irina-Camelia Begu
12. (Georgia (country)) Anna Tatishvili

== Lucky loser ==
1. (United States) Irina Falconi

== Qualifying draw ==
Key

- Q = Qualifier
- WC = Wild card
- LL = Lucky loser
- Alt = Alternate
- ITF = ITF entry
- PR = Protected ranking
- SR = Special ranking
- SE = Special exempt
- JE = Junior exempt
- JR = Junior Accelerator Programme entrant
- CO = College Accelerator Programme entrant
- NG = Next Gen Accelerator Program entrant
- w/o = Walkover
- r = Retired
- d = Defaulted

=== First qualifier ===
First round
1	(Canada) Sharon Fichman	3	1
(Switzerland) Belinda Bencic	6	6
(Italy) Nastassja Burnett	6	6
(Greece) Eleni Daniilidou	3	4
WC	(Australia) Priscilla Hon	0	1
(United States) Nicole Gibbs	6	6
WC	(Australia) Maddison Inglis	6^{4}	3
19	(Russia) Marta Sirotkina	7^{7}	6

Second round
(Switzerland) Belinda Bencic	6	7
(Italy) Nastassja Burnett	1	5
(United States) Nicole Gibbs	4	4
19	(Russia) Marta Sirotkina	6	6

Qualifying competition
(Switzerland) Belinda Bencic	6	6
19	(Russia) Marta Sirotkina	2	4

=== Second qualifier ===
First round
2	(United States) Coco Vandeweghe	4	4
(Australia) Anastasia Rodionova	6	6
(Austria) Melanie Klaffner	5	4
(Germany) Carina Witthöft	7	6
(Netherlands) Richèl Hogenkamp	1	6^{4}
(Croatia) Ana Vrljić	6	7^{7}
(France) Alizé Lim	7^{7}	6
21	(Portugal) Maria João Koehler	6^{1}	1

Second round
(Australia) Anastasia Rodionova	3	5
(Germany) Carina Witthöft	6	7
(Croatia) Ana Vrljić	6	1	5
(France) Alizé Lim	3	6	7

Qualifying competition
(Germany) Carina Witthöft	1	6	6
(France) Alizé Lim	6	4	3

=== Third qualifier ===
First round
3	(United Kingdom) Johanna Konta	6	6
(United States) Grace Min	2	1
(Japan) Sachie Ishizu	3	7	4
(Ukraine) Olga Savchuk	6	5	6
WC	(Croatia) Ana Konjuh	6	6
(Latvia) Diāna Marcinkēviča	4	0
(Uzbekistan) Nigina Abduraimova	3	2
18	(France) Mathilde Johansson	6	6

Second round
3	(United Kingdom) Johanna Konta	1	2
(Ukraine) Olga Savchuk	6	6
WC	(Croatia) Ana Konjuh	6	6^{5}	6
18	(France) Mathilde Johansson	2	7^{7}	4

Qualifying competition
(Ukraine) Olga Savchuk	0	3
WC	(Croatia) Ana Konjuh	6	6

=== Fourth qualifier ===
First round
4	(Germany) Anna-Lena Friedsam	6	4	7
(Romania) Andreea Mitu	3	6	9
(Serbia) Aleksandra Krunić	3	6	4
(Kazakhstan) Zarina Diyas	6	2	6
(Thailand) Noppawan Lertcheewakarn	6^{1}	4
(Canada) Stéphanie Dubois	7^{7}	6
(Italy) Alberta Brianti	6	1	4
15	(Russia) Alexandra Panova	4	6	6

Second round
(Romania) Andreea Mitu	7	3	0
(Kazakhstan) Zarina Diyas	5	6	6
(Canada) Stéphanie Dubois	6	6
15	(Russia) Alexandra Panova	3	3

Qualifying competition
(Kazakhstan) Zarina Diyas	7	6
(Canada) Stéphanie Dubois	5	3

=== Fifth qualifier ===
First round
5	(Poland) Katarzyna Piter	6	7^{7}
(Czech Republic) Eva Birnerová	3	6^{2}
(Japan) Yurika Sema	7^{7}	6
(United States) Julia Cohen	6^{0}	3
(Slovakia) Kristína Kučová	6	5	2
(Poland) Paula Kania	4	7	6
(United States) Maria Sanchez	3	6^{7}
13	(France) Claire Feuerstein	6	7^{9}

Second round
5	(Poland) Katarzyna Piter	7^{7}	6
(Japan) Yurika Sema	6^{4}	4
(Poland) Paula Kania	1	2
13	(France) Claire Feuerstein	6	6

Qualifying competition
5	(Poland) Katarzyna Piter	4	6	6
13	(France) Claire Feuerstein	6	2	3

=== Sixth qualifier ===
First round
6	(Ukraine) Maryna Zanevska	1	6^{3}
(Montenegro) Danka Kovinić	6	7^{7}
(Georgia (country)) Sofia Shapatava	6	4	0
(Japan) Eri Hozumi	2	6	6
(Russia) Alla Kudryavtseva	6	6
PR	(France) Aravane Rezaï	4	2
WC	(Australia) Naiktha Bains	2	6^{3}
17	(Czech Republic) Andrea Hlaváčková	6	7^{7}

Second round
(Montenegro) Danka Kovinić	6	6
(Japan) Eri Hozumi	3	2
(Russia) Alla Kudryavtseva	6	6
17	(Czech Republic) Andrea Hlaváčková	3	4

Qualifying competition
(Montenegro) Danka Kovinić	6^{4}	1
(Russia) Alla Kudryavtseva	7^{7}	6

=== Seventh qualifier ===
First round
7	(United Kingdom) Heather Watson	6	6
WC	(Australia) Arina Rodionova	4	3
(France) Stéphanie Foretz Gacon	6	6
WC	(Australia) Tammi Patterson	2	3
(Italy) Maria Elena Camerin	5	0
(South Africa) Chanel Simmonds	7	6
(China) Zheng Saisai	3	1
23	(United States) Irina Falconi	6	6

Second round
7	(United Kingdom) Heather Watson	6	2
(France) Stéphanie Foretz Gacon	0	0^{r}
(South Africa) Chanel Simmonds	2	0
23	(United States) Irina Falconi	6	6

Qualifying competition
7	(United Kingdom) Heather Watson	6	7^{7}
23	(United States) Irina Falconi	4	6^{1}

=== Eighth qualifier ===
First round
8	(Poland) Magda Linette	6	6
(Ukraine) Lyudmyla Kichenok	3	4
(Czech Republic) Lucie Hradecká	4	6	8
(Croatia) Tereza Mrdeža	6	0	6
(Argentina) María Irigoyen	4	1
(Ukraine) Anastasiya Vasylyeva	6	6
(Czech Republic) Renata Voráčová	5	7	6
16	(Sweden) Sofia Arvidsson	7	5	2

Second round
8	(Poland) Magda Linette	4	4
(Czech Republic) Lucie Hradecká	6	6
(Ukraine) Anastasiya Vasylyeva	5	7^{7}	2
(Czech Republic) Renata Voráčová	7	6^{4}	6

Qualifying competition
(Czech Republic) Lucie Hradecká	6	7^{7}
(Czech Republic) Renata Voráčová	4	6^{5}

=== Ninth qualifier ===
First round
9	(Czech Republic) Kristýna Plíšková	6	6
(Russia) Alisa Kleybanova	3	4
(United States) Victoria Duval	3	6	6
(Ukraine) Yuliya Beygelzimer	6	1	4
(Czech Republic) Kateřina Siniaková	2	6	6
(Turkey) Çağla Büyükakçay	6	3	3
(Romania) Alexandra Dulgheru	6	3	6
20	(Russia) Olga Puchkova	3	6	0

Second round
9	(Czech Republic) Kristýna Plíšková	2	2
(United States) Victoria Duval	6	6
(Czech Republic) Kateřina Siniaková	6	2	6
(Romania) Alexandra Dulgheru	3	6	2

Qualifying competition
(United States) Victoria Duval	2	3
(Czech Republic) Kateřina Siniaková	6	6

=== Tenth qualifier ===
First round
10	(Russia) Vera Dushevina	5	6	6
(Belarus) Ilona Kremen	7	2	1
(Japan) Erika Sema	6	7
(United Kingdom) Tara Moore	0	5
(Austria) Tamira Paszek	6	7
WC	(Australia) Sara Tomic	2	5
(China) Duan Yingying	6	7
22	(Kazakhstan) Sesil Karatantcheva	1	5

Second round
10	(Russia) Vera Dushevina	6	6
(Japan) Erika Sema	1	2
(Austria) Tamira Paszek	2	1
(China) Duan Yingying	6	6

Qualifying competition
10	(Russia) Vera Dushevina	6	4	4
(China) Duan Yingying	3	6	6

=== Eleventh qualifier ===
First round
11	(United States) Shelby Rogers	7	6
(Uzbekistan) Akgul Amanmuradova	5	2
(United States) Madison Brengle	7	6
(Czech Republic) Tereza Smitková	5	2
(Slovenia) Petra Rampre	2	4
(Serbia) Jovana Jakšić	6	6
(Liechtenstein) Stephanie Vogt	6	2	6
14	(Romania) Irina-Camelia Begu	4	6	8

Second round
11	(United States) Shelby Rogers	3	2
(United States) Madison Brengle	6	6
(Serbia) Jovana Jakšić	3	6	4
14	(Romania) Irina-Camelia Begu	6	1	6

Qualifying competition
(United States) Madison Brengle	3	7	1
14	(Romania) Irina-Camelia Begu	6	5	6

=== Twelfth qualifier ===
First round
12	(Georgia (country)) Anna Tatishvili	3	6	6
WC	(Canada) Aleksandra Wozniak	6	2	4
(Netherlands) Arantxa Rus	3	4
(Russia) Ekaterina Bychkova	6	6
(Japan) Risa Ozaki	6	6
(Belarus) Aliaksandra Sasnovich	1	4
(Switzerland) Viktorija Golubic	5	1
24	(Belgium) An-Sophie Mestach	7	6

Second round
12	(Georgia (country)) Anna Tatishvili	6	6^{5}	6
(Russia) Ekaterina Bychkova	4	7^{7}	4
(Japan) Risa Ozaki	6	3	6
24	(Belgium) An-Sophie Mestach	2	6	4

Qualifying competition
12	(Georgia (country)) Anna Tatishvili	6^{4}	7	6
(Japan) Risa Ozaki	7^{7}	5	2
