= 2014 Australian Open – Day-by-day summaries =

The 2014 Australian Open described in detail, in the form of day-by-day summaries.

== Day 1 (January 13) ==
- Damir Džumhur became the first Bosnia and Herzegovina male to compete in any Grand Slam tournament. He won his opening round match over Jan Hájek.
- Day 1 attendance: 63,595
- Seeds out:
  - Men's Singles: (Germany) Tommy Haas [12]
  - Women's Singles: (Czech Republic) Petra Kvitová [6], (Italy) Sara Errani [7], (Italy) Roberta Vinci [12], (Russia) Elena Vesnina [23]
- Schedule of Play

Matches on main courts
Matches on Rod Laver Arena
Event	Winner	Loser	Score
Women's Singles 1st Round	(Germany) Angelique Kerber [9]	(Australia) Jarmila Gajdošová [WC]	6–3, 0–6, 6–2
Men's Singles 1st Round	(Spain) David Ferrer [3]	(Colombia) Alejandro González	6–3, 6–4, 6–4
Women's Singles 1st Round	(Australia) Samantha Stosur [17]	(Czech Republic) Klára Zakopalová	6–3, 6–4
Men's Singles 1st Round	(Serbia) Novak Djokovic [2]	(Slovakia) Lukáš Lacko	6–3, 7–6^{(7–2)}, 6–1
Women's Singles 1st Round	(United States) Serena Williams [1]	(Australia) Ashleigh Barty [WC]	6–2, 6–1
Matches on Hisense Arena
Event	Winner	Loser	Score
Men's Singles 1st Round	(Switzerland) Stanislas Wawrinka [8]	(Kazakhstan) Andrey Golubev	6–4, 4–1, retired
Women's Singles 1st Round	(China) Li Na [4]	(Croatia) Ana Konjuh [Q]	6–2, 6–0
Women's Singles 1st Round	(Serbia) Ana Ivanovic [14]	(Netherlands) Kiki Bertens	6–4, 6–4
Men's Singles 1st Round	(Poland) Jerzy Janowicz [20]	(Australia) Jordan Thompson [WC]	1–6, 4–6, 6–4, 6–2, 6–1
Matches on Margaret Court Arena
Event	Winner	Loser	Score
Women's Singles 1st Round	(Russia) Ekaterina Makarova [22]	(United States) Venus Williams	2–6, 6–4, 6–4
Men's Singles 1st Round	(Czech Republic) Tomáš Berdych [7]	(Kazakhstan) Oleksandr Nedovyesov	6–3, 6–4, 6–3
Women's Singles 1st Round	(Germany) Julia Görges	(Italy) Sara Errani [7]	6–3, 6–2
Women's Singles 1st Round	(Thailand) Luksika Kumkhum	(Czech Republic) Petra Kvitová [6]	6–2, 1–6, 6–4
Men's Singles 1st Round	(Uzbekistan) Denis Istomin	(Cyprus) Marcos Baghdatis	6–4, 7–5, 6–4
Colored background indicates a night match
Matches start at 11:00 am; night matches do not start before 7:00 pm

== Day 2 (January 14) ==
On court temperatures hit 41 °C (106 °F), causing players and ballboys to collapse. Frank Dancevic describes the conditions as "inhumane".

- Day 2 attendance: 53,627
- Seeds out:
  - Men's Singles: (United States) John Isner [13]
  - Women's Singles: (Russia) Svetlana Kuznetsova [19], (Romania) Sorana Cîrstea [21], (Estonia) Kaia Kanepi [24]
- Schedule of Play

Matches on main courts
Matches on Rod Laver Arena
Event	Winner	Loser	Score
Women's Singles 1st Round	(Belarus) Victoria Azarenka [2]	(Sweden) Johanna Larsson	7–6^{(7–2)}, 6–2
Men's Singles 1st Round	(Switzerland) Roger Federer [6]	(Australia) James Duckworth [WC]	6–4, 6–4, 6–2
Men's Singles 1st Round	(Italy) Andreas Seppi [24]	(Australia) Lleyton Hewitt	7–6^{(7–4)}, 6–3, 5–7, 5–7, 7–5
Men's Singles 1st Round	(Spain) Rafael Nadal [1]	(Australia) Bernard Tomic	6–4, retired
Women's Singles 1st Round	(Russia) Maria Sharapova [3]	(United States) Bethanie Mattek-Sands	6–3, 6–4
Matches on Hisense Arena
Event	Winner	Loser	Score
Women's Singles 1st Round	(Denmark) Caroline Wozniacki [10]	(Spain) Lourdes Domínguez Lino	6–0, 6–2
Men's Singles 1st Round	(France) Jo-Wilfried Tsonga [10]	(Italy) Filippo Volandri	7–5, 6–3, 6–3
Women's Singles 1st Round	(Poland) Agnieszka Radwańska [5]	(Kazakhstan) Yulia Putintseva	6–0, 5–7, 6–2
Men's Singles 1st Round	(United Kingdom) Andy Murray [4]	(Japan) Go Soeda	6–1, 6–1, 6–3
Matches on Margaret Court Arena
Event	Winner	Loser	Score
Women's Singles 1st Round	(Romania) Simona Halep [11]	(Poland) Katarzyna Piter [Q]	6–0, 6–1
Women's Singles 1st Round	(Slovakia) Dominika Cibulková [20]	(Italy) Francesca Schiavone	6–3, 6–4
Women's Singles 1st Round	(Serbia) Jelena Janković [8]	(Japan) Misaki Doi	6–1, 6–2
Men's Singles 1st Round	(Argentina) Juan Martín del Potro [5]	(United States) Rhyne Williams	6–7^{(1–7)}, 6–3, 6–4, 6–4
Men's Singles 1st Round	(France) Gaël Monfils [25]	(United States) Ryan Harrison	6–4, 6–4, 6–4
Colored background indicates a night match
Matches start at 11:00 am; night matches do not start before 7:00 pm

== Day 3 (January 15) ==
Patrick Rafter played his first match in more than ten years when he partnered with Lleyton Hewitt in the opening round of doubles competition. The duo lost to Eric Butorac and Raven Klaasen 6–4, 7–5.

- Day 3 attendance: 49,860
- Seeds out:
  - Men's Singles: (Russia) Mikhail Youzhny [14], (Latvia) Ernests Gulbis [23], (Russia) Dmitry Tursunov [30], (Croatia) Ivan Dodig [32]
  - Women's Singles: (Germany) Sabine Lisicki [15], (Belgium) Kirsten Flipkens [18]
  - Men's Doubles: (Mexico) Santiago González / (United States) Scott Lipsky [16]
- Schedule of Play

Matches on main courts
Matches on Rod Laver Arena
Event	Winner	Loser	Score
Women's Singles 2nd Round	(China) Li Na [4]	(Switzerland) Belinda Bencic [Q]	6–0, 7–6^{(7–5)}
Women's Singles 2nd Round	(United States) Serena Williams [1]	(Serbia) Vesna Dolonc	6–1, 6–2
Men's Singles 2nd Round	(Serbia) Novak Djokovic [2]	(Argentina) Leonardo Mayer	6–0, 6–4, 6–4
Women's Singles 2nd Round	(Australia) Samantha Stosur [17]	(Bulgaria) Tsvetana Pironkova	6–2, 6–0
Men's Singles 2nd Round	(Canada) Vasek Pospisil [28]	(Australia) Matthew Ebden	3–6, 7–6^{(8–6)}, 7–6^{(11–9)}, 6–1
Matches on Hisense Arena
Event	Winner	Loser	Score
Men's Singles 2nd Round	(Czech Republic) Tomáš Berdych [7]	(France) Kenny de Schepper	6–4, 6–1, 6–3
Men's Singles 2nd Round	(Spain) David Ferrer [3]	(France) Adrian Mannarino	7–6^{(7–2)}, 5–7, 6–0, 6–3
Women's Singles 2nd Round	(Australia) Casey Dellacqua [WC]	(Belgium) Kirsten Flipkens [18]	6–3, 6–0
Men's Doubles 1st Round	(United States) Eric Butorac (South Africa) Raven Klaasen	(Australia) Lleyton Hewitt [WC] (Australia) Patrick Rafter [WC]	6–4, 7–5
Matches on Margaret Court Arena
Event	Winner	Loser	Score
Women's Singles 2nd Round	(Romania) Monica Niculescu	(Germany) Sabine Lisicki [15]	2–6, 6–2, 6–2
Women's Singles 2nd Round	(Italy) Flavia Pennetta [28]	(Puerto Rico) Monica Puig	6–3, 6–4
Women's Singles 2nd Round	(Germany) Angelique Kerber [9]	(Russia) Alla Kudryavtseva [Q]	6–4, 6–2
Men's Singles 2nd Round	(United States) Sam Querrey	(Latvia) Ernests Gulbis [23]	6–2, 6–3, 6–4
Men's Singles 2nd Round	(Switzerland) Stanislas Wawrinka [8]	(Colombia) Alejandro Falla	6–3, 6–3, 6–7^{(4–7)}, 6–4
Colored background indicates a night match
Matches start at 11:00 am; night matches do not start before 7:00 pm

== Day 4 (January 16) ==
- Day 4 attendance: 53,226
- Seeds out:
  - Men's Singles: (Argentina) Juan Martín del Potro [5], (Italy) Andreas Seppi [24], (Spain) Fernando Verdasco [31]
  - Women's Singles: (Slovakia) Magdaléna Rybáriková [32], (Serbia) Bojana Jovanovski [33]
  - Women's Doubles: (New Zealand) Marina Erakovic / (China) Zheng Jie [10]
- Schedule of Play

Matches on main courts
Matches on Rod Laver Arena
Event	Winner	Loser	Score
Women's Singles 2nd Round	(Russia) Maria Sharapova [3]	(Italy) Karin Knapp	6–3, 4–6, 10–8
Women's Singles 2nd Round	(Denmark) Caroline Wozniacki [10]	(United States) Christina McHale	6–0, 1–6, 6–2
Men's Singles 2nd Round	(Spain) Rafael Nadal [1]	(Australia) Thanasi Kokkinakis [WC]	6–2, 6–4, 6–2
Women's Singles 2nd Round	(Belarus) Victoria Azarenka [2]	(Czech Republic) Barbora Záhlavová-Strýcová	6–1, 6–4
Men's Singles 2nd Round	(United Kingdom) Andy Murray [4]	(France) Vincent Millot [Q]	6–2, 6–2, 7–5
Matches on Hisense Arena
Event	Winner	Loser	Score
Women's Singles 2nd Round	(Ukraine) Elina Svitolina	(Australia) Olivia Rogowska [WC]	6–4, 7–5
Men's Singles 2nd Round	(France) Jo-Wilfried Tsonga [10]	(Brazil) Thomaz Bellucci [Q]	7–6^{(8–6)}, 6–4, 6–4
Women's Singles 2nd Round	(Poland) Agnieszka Radwańska [5]	(Belarus) Olga Govortsova	6–0, 7–5
Men's Singles 2nd Round	(Switzerland) Roger Federer [6]	(Slovenia) Blaž Kavčič	6–2, 6–1, 7–6^{(7–4)}
Men's Singles 2nd Round	(France) Gaël Monfils [25]	(United States) Jack Sock	7–6^{(7–2)}, 7–5, 6–2
Matches on Margaret Court Arena
Event	Winner	Loser	Score
Women's Singles 2nd Round	(France) Alizé Cornet [25]	(Italy) Camila Giorgi	6–3, 4–6, 6–4
Women's Singles 2nd Round	(United States) Sloane Stephens [13]	(Croatia) Ajla Tomljanović	3–6, 6–2, 7–5
Men's Singles 2nd Round	(France) Benoît Paire [27]	(Australia) Nick Kyrgios [WC]	6–7^{(5–7)}, 6–7^{(5–7)}, 6–4, 6–2, 6–2
Colored background indicates a night match
Matches start at 11:00 am; night matches do not start before 7:00 pm

== Day 5 (January 17) ==
By winning her third round encounter against Daniela Hantuchová, Serena Williams broke Margaret Court's record of 60 match victories at the Australian Open. Chinese Li Na saved 1 match point at 1–6, 5–6, 30-40 during the match against Lucie Šafářová.

- Day 5 attendance:57,174
- Seeds out:
  - Men's Singles: (France) Richard Gasquet [9], (Poland) Jerzy Janowicz [20], (Canada) Vasek Pospisil [28], (France) Jérémy Chardy [29]
  - Women's Singles: (Australia) Samantha Stosur [17], (Czech Republic) Lucie Šafářová [26], (Slovakia) Daniela Hantuchová [31]
  - Men's Doubles: (Spain) Marcel Granollers / (Spain) Marc López [6], (Netherlands) Jean-Julien Rojer / (Romania) Horia Tecău [10]
  - Women's Doubles: (Chinese Taipei) Hsieh Su-wei / (China) Peng Shuai [2], (Russia) Alla Kudryavtseva / (Australia) Anastasia Rodionova [9], (United States) Vania King / (Kazakhstan) Galina Voskoboeva [16]
- Schedule of Play

Matches on main courts
Matches on Rod Laver Arena
Event	Winner	Loser	Score
Women's Singles 3rd Round	(United States) Serena Williams [1]	(Slovakia) Daniela Hantuchová [31]	6–3, 6–3
Men's Singles 3rd Round	(Spain) David Ferrer [3]	(France) Jérémy Chardy [29]	6–2, 7–6^{(7–5)}, 6–2
Women's Singles 3rd Round	(Australia) Casey Dellacqua [WC]	(China) Zheng Jie	6–2, 6–4
Women's Singles 3rd Round	(Serbia) Ana Ivanovic [14]	(Australia) Samantha Stosur [17]	6–7^{(8–10)}, 6–4, 6–2
Men's Singles 3rd Round	(Serbia) Novak Djokovic [2]	(Uzbekistan) Denis Istomin	6–3, 6–3, 7–5
Matches on Hisense Arena
Event	Winner	Loser	Score
Women's Singles 3rd Round	(Germany) Angelique Kerber [9]	(United States) Alison Riske	6–3, 6–4
Women's Singles 3rd Round	(China) Li Na [4]	(Czech Republic) Lucie Šafářová [26]	1–6, 7–6^{(7–2)}, 6–3
Men's Singles 3rd Round	(Czech Republic) Tomáš Berdych [7]	(Bosnia and Herzegovina) Damir Džumhur [Q]	6–4, 6–2, 6–2
Men's Singles 3rd Round	(Spain) Tommy Robredo [17]	(France) Richard Gasquet [9]	2–6, 7–5, 6–4, 7–6^{(8–6)}
Men's Doubles 1st Round	(United States) Bob Bryan [1] (United States) Mike Bryan [1]	(Australia) Paul Hanley (United Kingdom) Jonathan Marray	6–4, 7–6^{(7–3)}
Matches on Margaret Court Arena
Event	Winner	Loser	Score
Women's Singles 3rd Round	(Italy) Flavia Pennetta [28]	(Germany) Mona Barthel	6–1, 7–5
Men's Doubles 1st Round	(Croatia) Ivan Dodig [4] (Brazil) Marcelo Melo [4]	(Australia) Chris Guccione [WC] (Australia) Thanasi Kokkinakis [WC]	7–5, 7–6^{(7–5)}
Men's Singles 3rd Round	(South Africa) Kevin Anderson [19]	(France) Édouard Roger-Vasselin	3–6, 4–6, 6–3, 7–6^{(7–5)}, 7–5
Men's Singles 3rd Round	(Italy) Fabio Fognini [15]	(United States) Sam Querrey	7–5, 6–4, 6–4
Colored background indicates a night match
Matches start at 11:00 am; night matches do not start before 7:00 pm

== Day 6 (January 18) ==
- Day 6 attendance:80,219
- Seeds out:
  - Men's Singles: (Canada) Milos Raonic [11], (France) Gilles Simon [18], (France) Gaël Monfils [25], (Spain) Feliciano López [26], (France) Benoît Paire [27]
  - Women's Singles: (Denmark) Caroline Wozniacki [10] (Spain) Carla Suárez Navarro [16], (France) Alizé Cornet [25], (Russia) Anastasia Pavlyuchenkova [29]
  - Men's Doubles: (Spain) David Marrero / (Spain) Fernando Verdasco [3], (United Kingdom) Jamie Murray / (Australia) John Peers [15]
  - Women's Doubles: (Australia) Ashleigh Barty / (Australia) Casey Dellacqua [5], (Germany) Anna-Lena Grönefeld / (Croatia) Mirjana Lučić-Baroni [11], (France) Kristina Mladenovic / (Italy) Flavia Pennetta [12], (Germany) Julia Görges / (Czech Republic) Barbora Záhlavová-Strýcová [14]
- Schedule of Play

Matches on main courts
Matches on Rod Laver Arena
Event	Winner	Loser	Score
Women's Singles 3rd Round	(Russia) Maria Sharapova [3]	(France) Alizé Cornet [25]	6–1, 7–6^{(8–6)}
Men's Singles 3rd Round	(Switzerland) Roger Federer [6]	(Russia) Teymuraz Gabashvili	6–2, 6–2, 6–3
Women's Singles 3rd Round	(Spain) Garbiñe Muguruza	(Denmark) Caroline Wozniacki [10]	4–6, 7–5, 6–3
Women's Singles 3rd Round	(Belarus) Victoria Azarenka [2]	(Austria) Yvonne Meusburger	6–1, 6–0
Men's Singles 3rd Round	(Spain) Rafael Nadal [1]	(France) Gaël Monfils [25]	6–1, 6–2, 6–3
Matches on Hisense Arena
Event	Winner	Loser	Score
Women's Singles 3rd Round	(Serbia) Jelena Janković [8]	(Japan) Kurumi Nara	6–4, 7–5
Women's Singles 3rd Round	(Poland) Agnieszka Radwańska [5]	(Russia) Anastasia Pavlyuchenkova [29]	5–7, 6–2, 6–2
Men's Singles 3rd Round	(United Kingdom) Andy Murray [4]	(Spain) Feliciano López [26]	7–6 ^{(7–2)}, 6–4, 6–2
Men's Singles 3rd Round	(France) Jo-Wilfried Tsonga [10]	(France) Gilles Simon [18]	7–6 ^{(7–5)}, 6–4, 6–2
Men Legends' Doubles Round Robin	(France) Guy Forget (France) Henri Leconte	(South Africa) Wayne Ferreira (Croatia) Goran Ivanišević	6–2, 6–7^{(5–7)}, [10–8]
Matches on Margaret Court Arena
Event	Winner	Loser	Score
Women's Singles 3rd Round	(Slovakia) Dominika Cibulková [20]	(Spain) Carla Suárez Navarro [16]	6–1, 6–0
Women's Singles 3rd Round	(United States) Sloane Stephens [13]	(Ukraine) Elina Svitolina	7–5, 6–4
Men's Singles 3rd Round	(Bulgaria) Grigor Dimitrov [22]	(Canada) Milos Raonic [11]	6–3, 3–6, 6–4, 7–6^{(12–10)}
Men's Singles 3rd Round	(Japan) Kei Nishikori [16]	(United States) Donald Young	7–5, 6–1, 6–0
Colored background indicates a night match
Matches start at 11:00 am; night matches do not start before 7:00 pm

== Day 7 (January 19) ==
Former world number one and 2008 French Open champion Ana Ivanovic caused the biggest upset of the tournament thus far, coming from a set down to defeat world number one, five-time Australian Open champion and 17-time Grand Slam champion Serena Williams for the first time in five attempts. Her victory not only ended Williams' 25-match winning streak, which had dated back to Cincinnati last year, but also earned worldwide recognition and was one of the most discussed matches on social media, beating the record previously set during the 2012 Australian Open men's final. It was later revealed that Williams had played through the match with a back injury, which affected her performance in this match.

Elsewhere, 6-time Australian Open champions, the Bryan Brothers made their earliest exit at the Australian Open in 11 years after they were defeated by the unseeded duo of Eric Butorac and Raven Klaasen. The match lasted only 78 minutes, as Butorac and Klaasen won 7–6 (9), 6–4. Eugenie Bouchard became the first Canadian woman to reach a Grand Slam quarterfinal since Patricia Hy-Boulais did so at the 1992 US Open.

- Day 7 attendance: ?
- Seeds out:
  - Men's Singles: (Italy) Fabio Fognini [15], (Spain) Tommy Robredo [17], (South Africa) Kevin Anderson [19]
  - Women's Singles: (United States) Serena Williams [1], (Germany) Angelique Kerber [9], (Russia) Ekaterina Makarova [22]
  - Men's Doubles: (Austria) Alexander Peya / (Brazil) Bruno Soares [2], (India) Rohan Bopanna / (Pakistan) Aisam-ul-Haq Qureshi [7]
  - Women's Doubles: (Chinese Taipei) Chan Hao-ching / (United States) Liezel Huber [13]
  - Mixed Doubles: (United States) Liezel Huber / (Brazil) Marcelo Melo [3]
- Schedule of Play

Matches on main courts
Matches on Rod Laver Arena
Event	Winner	Loser	Score
Women's Singles 4th Round	(Italy) Flavia Pennetta [28]	(Germany) Angelique Kerber [9]	6–1, 4–6, 7–5
Women's Singles 4th Round	(Serbia) Ana Ivanovic [14]	(United States) Serena Williams [1]	4–6, 6–3, 6–3
Men's Singles 4th Round	(Serbia) Novak Djokovic [2]	(Italy) Fabio Fognini [15]	6–3, 6–0, 6–2
Women's Singles 4th Round	(Canada) Eugenie Bouchard [30]	(Australia) Casey Dellacqua [WC]	6–7^{(5–7)}, 6–2, 6–0
Men's Singles 4th Round	(Switzerland) Stanislas Wawrinka [8]	(Spain) Tommy Robredo [17]	6–3, 7–6^{(7–3)}, 7–6^{(7–5)}
Matches on Hisense Arena
Event	Winner	Loser	Score
Men Legends' Doubles Round Robin	(Iran) Mansour Bahrami (France) Cédric Pioline	(Australia) Pat Cash (Sweden) Mats Wilander	6–7^{(2–7)}, 6–1, [10–8]
Women's Singles 4th Round	(China) Li Na [4]	(Russia) Ekaterina Makarova [22]	6–2, 6–0
Men's Singles 4th Round	(Spain) David Ferrer [3]	(Germany) Florian Mayer	6–7^{(5–7)}, 7–5, 6–2, 6–1
Women's Doubles 3rd Round	(Italy) Sara Errani [1] (Italy) Roberta Vinci [1]	(Australia) Monique Adamczak [WC] (Australia) Olivia Rogowska [WC]	6–2, 6–2
Matches on Margaret Court Arena
Event	Winner	Loser	Score
Women's Doubles 3rd Round	(Australia) Jarmila Gajdošová [PR] (Croatia) Ajla Tomljanović [PR]	(Hungary) Tímea Babos (Croatia) Petra Martić	6–2, 7–5
Men's Doubles 3rd Round	(India) Leander Paes [5] (Czech Republic) Radek Štěpánek [5]	(India) Yuki Bhambri [WC] (New Zealand) Michael Venus [WC]	6–3, 6–2
Men's Doubles 3rd Round	(Australia) Alex Bolt [WC] (Australia) Andrew Whittington [WC]	(Spain) Pablo Carreño Busta (Spain) Guillermo García-López	6–7^{(4–7)}, 7–6^{(7–5)}, 7–5
Men's Singles 4th Round	(Czech Republic) Tomáš Berdych [7]	(South Africa) Kevin Anderson [19]	6–2, 6–2, 6–3
Colored background indicates a night match
Matches start at 11:00 am; night matches do not start before 7:00 pm

== Day 8 (January 20) ==
New ground was broken on Day 8 as Simona Halep reached the quarterfinals of Grand Slam for the first time in her career by defeating Jelena Janković in three sets, while Grigor Dimitrov became the first Bulgarian man to reach the quarterfinals of a Grand Slam tournament.

- Day 8 attendance: 48,491
- Seeds out:
  - Men's Singles: (France) Jo-Wilfried Tsonga [10], (Japan) Kei Nishikori [16]
  - Women's Singles: (Russia) Maria Sharapova [3], (Serbia) Jelena Janković [8], (United States) Sloane Stephens [13]
  - Men's Doubles: (United States) Bob Bryan / (United States) Mike Bryan [1], (Croatia) Ivan Dodig / (Brazil) Marcelo Melo [4], (Poland) Mariusz Fyrstenberg / (Poland) Marcin Matkowski [9], (France) Julien Benneteau / (France) Édouard Roger-Vasselin [11]
  - Women's Doubles: (Slovakia) Daniela Hantuchová / (United States) Lisa Raymond [15]
  - Mixed Doubles: (Czech Republic) Květa Peschke / (Poland) Marcin Matkowski [7], (Russia) Elena Vesnina / (India) Mahesh Bhupathi [8]
- Schedule of Play

Matches on main courts
Matches on Rod Laver Arena
Event	Winner	Loser	Score
Women's Singles 4th Round	(Slovakia) Dominika Cibulková [20]	(Russia) Maria Sharapova [3]	3–6, 6–4, 6–1
Women's Singles 4th Round	(Belarus) Victoria Azarenka [2]	(United States) Sloane Stephens [13]	6–3, 6–2
Men's Singles 4th Round	(Spain) Rafael Nadal [1]	(Japan) Kei Nishikori [16]	7–6^{(7–3)}, 7–5, 7–6^{(7–3)}
Men's Singles 4th Round	(Switzerland) Roger Federer [6]	(France) Jo-Wilfried Tsonga [10]	6–3, 7–5, 6–4
Women's Singles 4th Round	(Poland) Agnieszka Radwańska [5]	(Spain) Garbiñe Muguruza	6–1, 6–3
Matches on Hisense Arena
Event	Winner	Loser	Score
Men's Doubles 3rd Round	(United States) Eric Butorac (South Africa) Raven Klaasen	(United States) Bob Bryan [1] (United States) Mike Bryan [1]	7–6^{(11–9)}, 6–4
Women's Singles 4th Round	(Romania) Simona Halep [11]	(Serbia) Jelena Janković [8]	6–4, 2–6, 6–0
Mixed Doubles 2nd Round	(Slovenia) Katarina Srebotnik [2] (India) Rohan Bopanna [2]	(Australia) Ashleigh Barty (Australia) John Peers	7–6^{(7–5)}, 7–5
Men's Singles 4th Round	(United Kingdom) Andy Murray [4]	(France) Stéphane Robert [LL]	6–1, 6–2, 6–7^{(6–8)}, 6–2
Matches on Margaret Court Arena
Event	Winner	Loser	Score
Women's Doubles 3rd Round	(Czech Republic) Andrea Hlaváčková [7] (Czech Republic) Lucie Šafářová [7]	(United States) Madison Keys (United States) Alison Riske	6–4, 6–3
Men's Singles 4th Round	(Bulgaria) Grigor Dimitrov [22]	(Spain) Roberto Bautista Agut	6–3, 3–6, 6–2, 6–4
Women's Doubles 3rd Round	(Russia) Ekaterina Makarova [3] (Russia) Elena Vesnina [3]	(Slovakia) Daniela Hantuchová [15] (United States) Lisa Raymond [15]	6–4, 6–7^{(5–7)}, 6–2
Mixed Doubles 3rd Round	(India) Sania Mirza [6] (Romania) Horia Tecău [6]	(Australia) Anastasia Rodionova (United Kingdom) Colin Fleming	6–2, 6–2
Men Legends' Doubles Round Robin	(Australia) Todd Woodbridge (Australia) Mark Woodforde	(Iran) Mansour Bahrami (France) Cédric Pioline	4–6, 6–2, [11–9]
Colored background indicates a night match
Matches start at 11:00 am; night matches do not start before 7:00 pm

== Day 9 (January 21) ==
Eugenie Bouchard defeated Ana Ivanovic to become only the second Canadian to ever reach the semifinals of a Grand Slam in the open era, after Carling Bassett.

Another Serbian, Novak Djokovic, lost a five-set thriller to Stanislas Wawrinka, ending his 25 match winning streak at the event and 28 match winning streak overall. The defeat also ensured that there would be a new Australian Open finalist in the bottom half, as neither player from the opposing quarter-final (David Ferrer and Tomáš Berdych) had reached the final before. Berdych beat Ferrer in four sets to reach his first Australian Open semi-final and became the latest player to have reached at least the semi-finals of all four majors.

- Day 9 attendance:
- Seeds out:
  - Men's Singles: (Serbia) Novak Djokovic [2], (Spain) David Ferrer [3]
  - Women's Singles: (Serbia) Ana Ivanovic [14], (Italy) Flavia Pennetta [28]
  - Men's Doubles: (Philippines) Treat Huey / (United Kingdom) Dominic Inglot [12]
  - Women's Doubles: (Zimbabwe) Cara Black / (India) Sania Mirza [6], (Czech Republic) Andrea Hlaváčková / (Czech Republic) Lucie Šafářová [7]
  - Mixed Doubles: (Germany) Anna-Lena Grönefeld / (Austria) Alexander Peya [1], (Czech Republic) Andrea Hlaváčková / (Belarus) Max Mirnyi [4]
- Schedule of Play

Matches on main courts
Matches on Rod Laver Arena
Event	Winner	Loser	Score
Women's Singles Quarterfinals	(China) Li Na [4]	(Italy) Flavia Pennetta [28]	6–2, 6–2
Women's Singles Quarterfinals	(Canada) Eugenie Bouchard [30]	(Serbia) Ana Ivanovic [14]	5–7, 7–5, 6–2
Men's Singles Quarterfinals	(Czech Republic) Tomáš Berdych [7]	(Spain) David Ferrer [3]	6–1, 6–4, 2–6, 6–4
Men's Singles Quarterfinals	(Switzerland) Stanislas Wawrinka [8]	(Serbia) Novak Djokovic [2]	2–6, 6–4, 6–2, 3–6, 9–7
Men's Doubles Quarterfinals	(Canada) Daniel Nestor [8] (Serbia) Nenad Zimonjić [8]	(Australia) Alex Bolt [WC] (Australia) Andrew Whittington [WC]	6–2, 7–6^{(7–1)}
Matches on Margaret Court Arena
Event	Winner	Loser	Score
Men Legends' Doubles Round Robin	(Sweden) Jonas Björkman (Sweden) Thomas Enqvist	(France) Guy Forget (France) Henri Leconte	6–3, 7–6^{(10–8)}
Mixed Doubles 2nd Round	(China) Zheng Jie (United States) Scott Lipsky	(Germany) Anna-Lena Grönefeld [1] (Austria) Alexander Peya [1]	2–6, 7–6^{(7–5)}, [10–5]
Women's Doubles Quarterfinals	(Russia) Ekaterina Makarova [3] (Russia) Elena Vesnina [3]	(Czech Republic) Andrea Hlaváčková [7] (Czech Republic) Lucie Šafářová [7]	6–2, 2–6, 7–6^{(7–4)}
Women's Doubles Quarterfinals	(Italy) Sara Errani [1] (Italy) Roberta Vinci [1]	(Zimbabwe) Cara Black [6] (India) Sania Mirza [6]	6–2, 3–6, 6–4
Women's Doubles Quarterfinals	(Czech Republic) Květa Peschke [4] (Slovenia) Katarina Srebotnik [4]	(Australia) Jarmila Gajdošová [PR] (Croatia) Ajla Tomljanović [PR]	7–5, 4–6, 6–4
Colored background indicates a night match
Matches start at 11:00 am; night matches do not start before 7:00 pm

== Day 10 (January 22) ==
Roger Federer became the first man to reach 11 consecutive semifinals at the Australian Open following his four-set victory over Andy Murray in the quarterfinals. Victoria Azarenka lost to Agnieszka Radwańska, ending a seven match winning streak over Radwańska and an eighteen match winning streak at the event. By defeating Azarenka, Radwańska advanced to her third major semifinal, the first since the 2013 Wimbledon Championships.

- Day 10 attendance:
- Seeds out:
  - Men's Singles: (United Kingdom) Andy Murray [4], (Bulgaria) Grigor Dimitrov [22]
  - Women's Singles: (Belarus) Victoria Azarenka [2], (Romania) Simona Halep [11]
  - Men's Doubles: (India) Leander Paes / (Czech Republic) Radek Štěpánek [5]
  - Women's Doubles: (Czech Republic) Květa Peschke / (Slovenia) Katarina Srebotnik [4], (United States) Raquel Kops-Jones / (United States) Abigail Spears [8]
  - Mixed Doubles: (Slovenia) Katarina Srebotnik / (India) Rohan Bopanna [2], (Spain) Anabel Medina Garrigues / (Brazil) Bruno Soares [5]
- Schedule of Play

Matches on main courts
Matches on Rod Laver Arena
Event	Winner	Loser	Score
Women's Singles Quarterfinals	(Slovakia) Dominika Cibulková [20]	(Romania) Simona Halep [11]	6–3, 6–0
Women's Singles Quarterfinals	(Poland) Agnieszka Radwańska [5]	(Belarus) Victoria Azarenka [2]	6–1, 5–7, 6–0
Men's Singles Quarterfinals	(Spain) Rafael Nadal [1]	(Bulgaria) Grigor Dimitrov [22]	3–6, 7–6^{(7–3)}, 7–6^{(9–7)}, 6–2
Men's Singles Quarterfinals	(Switzerland) Roger Federer [6]	(United Kingdom) Andy Murray [4]	6–3, 6–4, 6–7^{(6–8)}, 6–3
Mixed Doubles Quarterfinals	(Australia) Jarmila Gajdošová [WC] (Australia) Matthew Ebden [WC]	(Slovenia) Katarina Srebotnik [2] (India) Rohan Bopanna [2]	7–5, 6–3
Matches on Margaret Court Arena
Event	Winner	Loser	Score
Men Legends' Doubles Round Robin	(Australia) Todd Woodbridge (Australia) Mark Woodforde	(Australia) Pat Cash (Sweden) Mats Wilander	6–3, 1–6, [10–3]
Men's Doubles Quarterfinals	(France) Michaël Llodra [13] (France) Nicolas Mahut [13]	(India) Leander Paes [5] (Czech Republic) Radek Štěpánek [5]	6–2, 7–6^{(7–4)}
Women Legends' Doubles Round Robin	(Australia) Nicole Bradtke (Australia) Rennae Stubbs	(Croatia) Iva Majoli (Austria) Barbara Schett	6–3, 3–6, [10–7]
Women's Doubles Semifinals	(Italy) Sara Errani [1] (Italy) Roberta Vinci [1]	(Czech Republic) Květa Peschke [4] (Slovenia) Katarina Srebotnik [4]	6–1, 6–4
Mixed Doubles Quarterfinals	(China) Zheng Jie (United States) Scott Lipsky	(Spain) Anabel Medina Garrigues [5] (Brazil) Bruno Soares [5]	3–6, 6–4, [10–7]
Colored background indicates a night match
Matches start at 11:00 am; night matches do not start before 7:00 pm

== Day 11 (January 23) ==
Li Na reached her third Australian Open final in four years by beating Eugenie Bouchard. Dominika Cibulková became the first Slovak to reach the Australian Open final following her win over Agnieszka Radwańska. Stanislas Wawrinka reached his first major final by beating Tomáš Berdych in four sets.

- Day 11 attendance:33,942
- Seeds out:
- Seeds out:
  - Men's Singles: (Czech Republic) Tomáš Berdych [7]
  - Women's Singles: (Poland) Agnieszka Radwańska [5], (Canada) Eugenie Bouchard [30]
  - Men's Doubles: (Canada) Daniel Nestor / (Serbia) Nenad Zimonjić [8], (France) Michaël Llodra / (France) Nicolas Mahut [13]
- Schedule of Play

Matches on main courts
Matches on Rod Laver Arena
Event	Winner	Loser	Score
Men's Doubles Semifinals	(United States) Eric Butorac (South Africa) Raven Klaasen	(Canada) Daniel Nestor [8] (Serbia) Nenad Zimonjić [8]	6–2, 6–4
Women's Singles Semifinals	(China) Li Na [4]	(Canada) Eugenie Bouchard [30]	6–2, 6–4
Women's Singles Semifinals	(Slovakia) Dominika Cibulková [20]	(Poland) Agnieszka Radwańska [5]	6–1, 6–2
Men's Singles Semifinals	(Switzerland) Stanislas Wawrinka [8]	(Czech Republic) Tomáš Berdych [7]	6–3, 6–7^{(1–7)},7–6^{(7–3)}, 7–6^{(7–4)}
Exhibition Doubles	(Iran) Mansour Bahrami (Croatia) Goran Ivanišević	(Australia) Pat Cash (France) Henri Leconte	4–2, 4–2
Matches on Margaret Court Arena
Event	Winner	Loser	Score
Women Legends' Doubles Round Robin	(Switzerland) Martina Hingis (United States) Martina Navratilova	(Croatia) Iva Majoli (Austria) Barbara Schett	7–6^{(7–3)}, 6–4
Men's Doubles Semifinals	(Poland) Łukasz Kubot [14] (Sweden) Robert Lindstedt [14]	(France) Michaël Llodra [13] (France) Nicolas Mahut [13]	6–4, 6–7^{(12–14)}, 6–3
Mixed Doubles Quarterfinals	(India) Sania Mirza [6] (Romania) Horia Tecău [6]	(Germany) Julia Görges (Pakistan) Aisam-ul-Haq Qureshi	6–3, 6–4
Men Legends' Doubles Round Robin	(France) Yannick Noah (France) Fabrice Santoro	(Iran) Mansour Bahrami (France) Cédric Pioline	6–1, 1–6, [12–10]
Mixed Doubles Quarterfinals	(France) Kristina Mladenović (Canada) Daniel Nestor	(Slovakia) Daniela Hantuchová (India) Leander Paes	6–3, 6–3
Colored background indicates a night match
Matches start at 11:00 am; night matches do not start before 7:00 pm

== Day 12 (January 24) ==
Rafael Nadal beat Roger Federer in straight sets to reach his third Australian Open final and 19th Grand Slam final overall.

- Day 12 attendance:
- Seeds out:
  - Men's Singles: (Switzerland) Roger Federer [6]
  - Women's Doubles: (Russia) Ekaterina Makarova / (Russia) Elena Vesnina [3]
- Schedule of Play

Matches on main courts
Matches on Rod Laver Arena
Event	Winner	Loser	Score
Mixed Doubles Semifinals	(India) Sania Mirza [6] (Romania) Horia Tecău [6]	(Australia) Jarmila Gajdošová [WC] (Australia) Matthew Ebden [WC]	2–6, 6–3, [10–2]
Women's Doubles Final	(Italy) Sara Errani [1] (Italy) Roberta Vinci [1]	(Russia) Ekaterina Makarova [3] (Russia) Elena Vesnina [3]	6–4, 3–6, 7–5
Men's Singles Semifinals	(Spain) Rafael Nadal [1]	(Switzerland) Roger Federer [6]	7–6^{(7–4)}, 6–3, 6–3
Matches on Margaret Court Arena
Event	Winner	Loser	Score
Boys' Singles Semifinals	(Germany) Alexander Zverev [1]	(Australia) Bradley Mousley	6–4, 1–6, 6–1
Mixed Doubles Semifinals	(France) Kristina Mladenovic (Canada) Daniel Nestor	(China) Zheng Jie (United States) Scott Lipsky	6–3, 6–1
Men Legends' Doubles Finals	(Australia) Todd Woodbridge (Australia) Mark Woodforde	(Sweden) Jonas Björkman (Sweden) Thomas Enqvist	4–6, 6–2, [13–11]
Colored background indicates a night match
Matches start at 3:00 pm; night matches do not start before 7:30 pm

== Day 13 (January 25) ==
Li Na won her first Australian Open title against first-time major finalist Dominika Cibulková. Li broke serve in the first game of the match but was broken back at 3–2, only to break again at 5–5 and serve for the set. Cibulková saved set point and took it into a tiebreak, which Li won and completed the second set 6–0 for the victory. For Li, it was her second Grand Slam title.

- Day 13 attendance: 19,225
- Seeds out:
  - Women's Singles: (Slovakia) Dominika Cibulková [20]

Matches on main courts
Matches on Rod Laver Arena
Event	Winner	Loser	Score
Boys' Singles Finals	(Germany) Alexander Zverev [1]	(United States) Stefan Kozlov [2]	6–3, 6–0
Girls' Singles Finals	(Russia) Elizaveta Kulichkova [4]	(Croatia) Jana Fett	6–2, 6–1
Women's Singles Final	(China) Li Na [4]	(Slovakia) Dominika Cibulková [20]	7–6^{(7–3)}, 6–0
Men's Doubles Final	(Poland) Łukasz Kubot [14] (Sweden) Robert Lindstedt [14]	(United States) Eric Butorac (South Africa) Raven Klaasen	6–3, 6–3
Colored background indicates a night match
Matches start at 1:00 pm; night matches do not start before 7:30 pm

== Day 14 (January 26) ==
Stanislas Wawrinka won the first two sets against Rafael Nadal in the final. In winning the first set, Wawrinka was down 0–40 while serving for it at 5–3, but Nadal was unable to return any of Wawrinka's next five serves, which proved to be Wawrinka's 34th consecutive successful hold of serve. In the second set, Wawrinka broke in the opening game and held his own serve to lead 2–0, before Nadal sustained a back injury and needed a medical timeout. Wawrinka comfortably won the set as commentators speculated that Nadal may have been considering forfeiting the match and was seen to be in tears during changeovers. Nadal continued and won the third set, despite facing 15–40 in the first game on his own serve and also facing 15–40 while serving for the set at 5–3, as Wawrinka appeared to be suffering from nerves. Wawrinka won the match in the fourth set by winning the last eight points without reply. Pete Sampras awarded Wawrinka the trophy. This was the first time since Sergi Bruguera's 1993 French Open win that the winner of a Grand Slam men's event beat both number one and two seeds to clinch the championship; Wawrinka also became the first player to beat both Djokovic and Nadal in the same grand slam.

For Wawrinka, it was his first career Grand Slam title. In twelve previous match versus Nadal, he had not won a single set. Wawrinka became the third Swiss player to win a Grand Slam after Martina Hingis (who won five singles titles) and Roger Federer (who has won 17 to date). It was also the first time Nadal had lost a major final to anyone other than Federer or Novak Djokovic.

- Day 14 attendance:
- Seeds out:
  - Men's Singles: (Spain) Rafael Nadal [1]
  - Mixed Doubles: (India) Sania Mirza / (Romania) Horia Tecău [6]
- Schedule of Play

Matches on main courts
Matches on Rod Laver Arena
Event	Winner	Loser	Score
Mixed Doubles Final	(France) Kristina Mladenovic (Canada) Daniel Nestor	(India) Sania Mirza [6] (Romania) Horia Tecău [6]	6–3, 6–2
Men's Singles Final	(Switzerland) Stanislas Wawrinka [8]	(Spain) Rafael Nadal [1]	6–3, 6–2, 3–6, 6–3
Colored background indicates a night match
Matches start at 4:00 pm; night matches do not start before 7:30 pm
