= 2014 Australian Open – Wheelchair quad singles =

Wheelchair quad singles
- 2014 Australian Open

Final
- Champion: (United States) David Wagner
- Runner-up: (South Africa) Lucas Sithole
- Score: 3–6, 7–5, 6–3

Events
Singles	men	women		boys	girls
Doubles	men	women	mixed	boys	girls
WC Singles	men	women	quad
WC Doubles	men	women	quad
Legends	men	women	mixed
- Australian Open

Defending champion David Wagner defeated Lucas Sithole in the final, 3–6, 7–5, 6–3 to win the quad singles wheelchair tennis title at the 2014 Australian Open.

== Seeds ==
1. (United States) David Wagner (champion)
2. (South Africa) Lucas Sithole (final)

== Draw ==
Key

- Q = Qualifier
- WC = Wild card
- LL = Lucky loser
- Alt = Alternate
- ITF = ITF entry
- PR = Protected ranking
- SR = Special ranking
- SE = Special exempt
- JE = Junior exempt
- JR = Junior Accelerator Programme entrant
- CO = College Accelerator Programme entrant
- NG = Next Gen Accelerator Program entrant
- w/o = Walkover
- r = Retired
- d = Defaulted

=== Final ===
Final
1	(United States) David Wagner	3	7	6
2	(South Africa) Lucas Sithole	6	5	3

=== Round robin ===
		(United States) Wagner	(Australia) Alcott	(United Kingdom) Lapthorne	(South Africa) Sithole	RR; W–L	Set; W–L	Game; W–L	Standings
1	(United States) David Wagner		4–6, 7–6^{(7–5)}, 6–3	5–7, 5–7	7–6^{(7–2)}, 7–6^{(7–4)}	2–1	4–3	42–41	1
	(Australia) Dylan Alcott	6–4, 6–7^{(5–7)}, 3–6		6–4, 5–7, 8–6	6–2, 2–6, 6–8	1–2	4–5	48–50	3
	(United Kingdom) Andrew Lapthorne	7–5, 7–5	4–6, 7–5, 6–8		4–6, 2–6	1–2	3–4	37–39	4
2	(South Africa) Lucas Sithole	6–7^{(2–7)}, 6–7^{(4–7)}	2–6, 6–2, 8–6	6–4, 6–2		2–1	4–3	40–34	2

Standings are determined by: 1. number of wins; 2. number of matches; 3. in two-players-ties, head-to-head records; 4. in three-players-ties, percentage of sets won, or of games won; 5. steering-committee decision.
