= 2014 Australian Open – Wheelchair quad doubles =

Wheelchair quad doubles
- 2014 Australian Open

Final
- Champions: (United States) David Wagner (United Kingdom) Andrew Lapthorne
- Runners-up: (Australia) Dylan Alcott (South Africa) Lucas Sithole
- Score: 6–4, 6–4

Events
Singles	men	women		boys	girls
Doubles	men	women	mixed	boys	girls
WC Singles	men	women	quad
WC Doubles	men	women	quad
Legends	men	women	mixed
- Australian Open

Defending champion David Wagner and his partner Andrew Lapthorne defeated Dylan Alcott and Lucas Sithole in the final, 6–4, 6–4 to win the quad doubles wheelchair tennis title at the 2014 Australian Open.

Wagner and Nicholas Taylor were the reigning champions, but Taylor did not compete this year as he was ranked outside the world's top 3, and did not receive the event's wildcard.

== Seeds ==
1. (United Kingdom) Andrew Lapthorne / (United States) David Wagner
2. (Australia) Dylan Alcott / (South Africa) Lucas Sithole

== Main draw ==
Key

- Q = Qualifier
- WC = Wild card
- LL = Lucky loser
- Alt = Alternate
- ITF = ITF entry
- PR = Protected ranking
- SR = Special ranking
- SE = Special exempt
- JE = Junior exempt
- JR = Junior Accelerator Programme entrant
- CO = College Accelerator Programme entrant
- NG = Next Gen Accelerator Program entrant
- w/o = Walkover
- r = Retired
- d = Defaulted

=== Final ===
Finals
1	(United Kingdom) Andrew Lapthorne (United States) David Wagner	6	6
2	(Australia) Dylan Alcott (South Africa) Lucas Sithole	4	4
