= 2014 Australian Open – Mixed doubles =

Mixed doubles
- 2014 Australian Open

Final
- Champions: (France) Kristina Mladenovic (Canada) Daniel Nestor
- Runners-up: (India) Sania Mirza (Romania) Horia Tecău
- Score: 6–3, 6–2

Details
- Draw: 32
- Seeds: 8

Events
Singles	men	women		boys	girls
Doubles	men	women	mixed	boys	girls
WC Singles	men	women	quad
WC Doubles	men	women	quad
Legends	men	women	mixed
- Australian Open

Jarmila Gajdošová and Matthew Ebden were the defending champions, but they lost in the semifinals to Sania Mirza and Horia Tecău.

Kristina Mladenovic and Daniel Nestor won the title, defeating Mirza and Tecău in the final, 6–3, 6–2.

== Seeds ==
1. (Germany) Anna-Lena Grönefeld / (Austria) Alexander Peya (second round)
2. (Slovenia) Katarina Srebotnik / (India) Rohan Bopanna (quarterfinals)
3. (United States) Liezel Huber / (Brazil) Marcelo Melo (first round)
4. (Czech Republic) Andrea Hlaváčková / (Belarus) Max Mirnyi (second round)
5. (Spain) Anabel Medina Garrigues / (Brazil) Bruno Soares (quarterfinals)
6. (India) Sania Mirza / (Romania) Horia Tecău (final)
7. (Czech Republic) Květa Peschke / (Poland) Marcin Matkowski (second round)
8. (Russia) Elena Vesnina / (India) Mahesh Bhupathi (second round)

== Draw ==
Key

- Q = Qualifier
- WC = Wild card
- LL = Lucky loser
- Alt = Alternate
- ITF = ITF entry
- PR = Protected ranking
- SR = Special ranking
- SE = Special exempt
- JE = Junior exempt
- JR = Junior Accelerator Programme entrant
- CO = College Accelerator Programme entrant
- NG = Next Gen Accelerator Program entrant
- w/o = Walkover
- r = Retired
- d = Defaulted

=== Finals ===
Semifinals
(China) Zheng Jie (United States) Scott Lipsky	3	1
(France) Kristina Mladenovic (Canada) Daniel Nestor	6	6
6	(India) Sania Mirza (Romania) Horia Tecău	2	6	[10]
WC	(Australia) Jarmila Gajdošová (Australia) Matthew Ebden	6	3	[2]

Final
(France) Kristina Mladenovic (Canada) Daniel Nestor	6	6
6	(India) Sania Mirza (Romania) Horia Tecău	3	2

=== Top half ===
First round
1	(Germany) A-L Grönefeld (Austria) A Peya	6	7^{7}
(Russia) V Dushevina (Netherlands) J-J Rojer	3	6^{5}
Alt	(Poland) A Rosolska (Sweden) J Brunström	3	4
(China) J Zheng (United States) S Lipsky	6	6
Alt	(Czech Republic) L Hradecká (Germany) M Emmrich	1	6^{5}
(United States) A Spears (United Kingdom) D Inglot	6	7^{7}
(Zimbabwe) C Black (United Kingdom) J Murray	2	4
5	(Spain) A Medina Garrigues (Brazil) B Soares	6	6
3	(United States) L Huber (Brazil) M Melo	2	2
(United States) L Raymond (Poland) M Fyrstenberg	6	6
(Chinese Taipei) S-w Hsieh (South Africa) R Klaasen	5	3
(France) K Mladenovic (Canada) D Nestor	7	6
WC	(Croatia) A Tomljanović (Australia) J Duckworth	5	6	[7]
(Slovakia) D Hantuchová (India) L Paes	7	4	[10]
(Spain) A Parra Santonja (Spain) D Marrero	7^{7}	4	[5]
8	(Russia) E Vesnina (India) M Bhupathi	6^{3}	6	[10]

Second round
1	(Germany) A-L Grönefeld (Austria) A Peya	6	6^{5}	[5]
(China) J Zheng (United States) S Lipsky	2	7^{7}	[10]
(United States) A Spears (United Kingdom) D Inglot	7^{7}	5	[8]
5	(Spain) A Medina Garrigues (Brazil) B Soares	6^{5}	7	[10]
(United States) L Raymond (Poland) M Fyrstenberg	4	1
(France) K Mladenovic (Canada) D Nestor	6	6
(Slovakia) D Hantuchová (India) L Paes	6	2	[10]
8	(Russia) E Vesnina (India) M Bhupathi	0	6	[6]

Quarterfinals
(China) J Zheng (United States) S Lipsky	3	6	[10]
5	(Spain) A Medina Garrigues (Brazil) B Soares	6	4	[7]
(France) K Mladenovic (Canada) D Nestor	6	6
(Slovakia) D Hantuchová (India) L Paes	3	3

Semifinals
(China) J Zheng (United States) S Lipsky	3	1
(France) K Mladenovic (Canada) D Nestor	6	6

=== Bottom half ===
First round
6	(India) S Mirza (Romania) H Tecău	4	7^{7}	[10]
(Chinese Taipei) H-c Chan (Sweden) R Lindstedt	6	6^{3}	[8]
(Russia) S Kuznetsova (Serbia) N Zimonjić	4	4
(Australia) An Rodionova (United Kingdom) C Fleming	6	6
WC	(Croatia) D Vekić (Australia) T Kokkinakis	3	4
(Germany) J Görges (Pakistan) A-u-H Qureshi	6	6
(Australia) C Dellacqua (United Kingdom) R Hutchins	4	4
4	(Czech Republic) A Hlaváčková (Belarus) M Mirnyi	6	6
7	(Czech Republic) K Peschke (Poland) M Matkowski	7	6
WC	(Australia) Ar Rodionova (Australia) N Kyrgios	5	4
WC	(Australia) S Sanders (Australia) C Guccione	2	4
WC	(Australia) J Gajdošová (Australia) M Ebden	6	6
WC	(Australia) O Rogowska (Australia) J-P Smith	3	4
(Australia) A Barty (Australia) J Peers	6	6
(United States) R Kops-Jones (Philippines) T Huey	2	3
2	(Slovenia) K Srebotnik (India) R Bopanna	6	6

Second round
6	(India) S Mirza (Romania) H Tecău	6	6
(Australia) An Rodionova (United Kingdom) C Fleming	2	2
(Germany) J Görges (Pakistan) A-u-H Qureshi	6	6
4	(Czech Republic) A Hlaváčková (Belarus) M Mirnyi	3	4
7	(Czech Republic) K Peschke (Poland) M Matkowski	4	6	[6]
WC	(Australia) J Gajdošová (Australia) M Ebden	6	3	[10]
(Australia) A Barty (Australia) J Peers	6^{5}	5
2	(Slovenia) K Srebotnik (India) R Bopanna	7^{7}	7

Quarterfinals
6	(India) S Mirza (Romania) H Tecău	6	6
(Germany) J Görges (Pakistan) A-u-H Qureshi	3	4
WC	(Australia) J Gajdošová (Australia) M Ebden	7	6
2	(Slovenia) K Srebotnik (India) R Bopanna	5	3

Semifinals
6	(India) S Mirza (Romania) H Tecău	2	6	[10]
WC	(Australia) J Gajdošová (Australia) M Ebden	6	3	[2]
