= 2014 Australian Open – Men's singles =

Tennis tournament held in 2014

Men's singles
- 2014 Australian Open

Final
- Champion: (Switzerland) Stan Wawrinka
- Runner-up: (Spain) Rafael Nadal
- Score: 6–3, 6–2, 3–6, 6–3

Details
- Draw: 128 ( 16Q / 8WC)
- Seeds: 32

Events
Singles	men	women		boys	girls
Doubles	men	women	mixed	boys	girls
WC Singles	men	women	quad
WC Doubles	men	women	quad
Legends	men	women	mixed
- Australian Open

Stan Wawrinka defeated Rafael Nadal in the final, 6–3, 6–2, 3–6, 6–3 to win the men's singles tennis title at the 2014 Australian Open. It was his first major title, becoming the first man outside the Big Four to win a major since Juan Martín del Potro at the 2009 US Open. Wawrinka was the first man to defeat the top two seeds at a major since Sergi Bruguera at the 1993 French Open, defeating top-seed Nadal and second-seed Novak Djokovic. Nadal was attempting to complete the double career Grand Slam; he would achieve the feat eight years later.

Djokovic was the three-time defending champion, but lost in the quarterfinals to Wawrinka in a rematch of the previous year's fourth-round match. This ended Djokovic's 25-match winning streak at the Australian Open, 28-match winning streak overall, and streak of 14 consecutive major semifinals.

Roger Federer made his 57th consecutive major appearance, breaking Wayne Ferreira's all-time record. He also made his eleventh consecutive semifinal at this tournament.

This was the first major appearance for future US Open champion and world No. 3 Dominic Thiem; he lost in the second round to Kevin Anderson.

Stéphane Robert became the first lucky loser to reach the fourth round, defeating fellow lucky loser Martin Kližan in the third round — the first such encounter at a major since the 1973 Wimbledon Championships.

== Seeds ==
1. (Spain) Rafael Nadal (final)
2. (Serbia) Novak Djokovic (quarterfinals)
3. (Spain) David Ferrer (quarterfinals)
4. (United Kingdom) Andy Murray (quarterfinals)
5. (Argentina) Juan Martín del Potro (second round)
6. (Switzerland) Roger Federer (semifinals)
7. (Czech Republic) Tomáš Berdych (semifinals)
8. (Switzerland) Stan Wawrinka (champion)
9. (France) Richard Gasquet (third round)
10. (France) Jo-Wilfried Tsonga (fourth round)
11. (Canada) Milos Raonic (third round)
12. (Germany) Tommy Haas (first round, retired because of a shoulder injury)
13. (United States) John Isner (first round, retired because of a foot injury)
14. (Russia) Mikhail Youzhny (second round)
15. (Italy) Fabio Fognini (fourth round)
16. (Japan) Kei Nishikori (fourth round)

17. (Spain) Tommy Robredo (fourth round)
18. (France) Gilles Simon (third round)
19. (South Africa) Kevin Anderson (fourth round)
20. (Poland) Jerzy Janowicz (third round)
21. (Germany) Philipp Kohlschreiber (withdrew due to hamstring injury)
22. (Bulgaria) Grigor Dimitrov (quarterfinals)
23. (Latvia) Ernests Gulbis (second round)
24. (Italy) Andreas Seppi (second round)
25. (France) Gaël Monfils (third round)
26. (Spain) Feliciano López (third round)
27. (France) Benoît Paire (third round)
28. (Canada) Vasek Pospisil (third round, withdrew because of a back injury)
29. (France) Jérémy Chardy (third round)
30. (Russia) Dmitry Tursunov (second round)
31. (Spain) Fernando Verdasco (second round)
32. (Croatia) Ivan Dodig (second round, retired because of severe cramping)

Click on the seed number of a player to go to their draw section.

== Draw ==
Key

- Q = Qualifier
- WC = Wild card
- LL = Lucky loser
- Alt = Alternate
- ITF = ITF entry
- PR = Protected ranking
- SR = Special ranking
- SE = Special exempt
- JE = Junior exempt
- JR = Junior Accelerator Programme entrant
- CO = College Accelerator Programme entrant
- NG = Next Gen Accelerator Program entrant
- w/o = Walkover
- r = Retired
- d = Defaulted

=== Finals ===
Quarterfinals
1	(Spain) Rafael Nadal	3	7^{7}	7^{9}	6
22	(Bulgaria) Grigor Dimitrov	6	6^{3}	6^{7}	2
4	(United Kingdom) Andy Murray	3	4	7^{8}	3
6	(Switzerland) Roger Federer	6	6	6^{6}	6
7	(Czech Republic) Tomáš Berdych	6	6	2	6
3	(Spain) David Ferrer	1	4	6	4
8	(Switzerland) Stan Wawrinka	2	6	6	3	9
2	(Serbia) Novak Djokovic	6	4	2	6	7

Semifinals
1	(Spain) Rafael Nadal	7^{7}	6	6
6	(Switzerland) Roger Federer	6^{4}	3	3
7	(Czech Republic) Tomáš Berdych	3	7^{7}	6^{3}	6^{4}
8	(Switzerland) Stan Wawrinka	6	6^{1}	7^{7}	7^{7}

Final
1	(Spain) Rafael Nadal	3	2	6	3
8	(Switzerland) Stan Wawrinka	6	6	3	6

=== Top half ===
==== Section 1 ====
First round
1	(Spain) R Nadal	6	0
(Australia) B Tomic	4	0^{r}
WC	(Australia) T Kokkinakis	7^{7}	0	7^{7}	6
(Netherlands) I Sijsling	6^{4}	6	6^{3}	2
(Germany) T Kamke	6^{5}	7	2	4
(United States) J Sock	7^{7}	5	6	6
(United States) R Harrison	4	4	4
25	(France) G Monfils	6	6	6
24	(Italy) A Seppi	7^{7}	6	5	5	7
(Australia) L Hewitt	6^{4}	3	7	7	5
(Netherlands) R Haase	7^{7}	6^{2}	2	0^{r}
(United States) D Young	6^{4}	7^{7}	6	1
Q	(Serbia) D Lajović	6	7^{11}	4	6
WC	(France) L Pouille	4	6^{9}	6	3
(Australia) M Matosevic	3	7	2	6	2
16	(Japan) K Nishikori	6	5	6	4	6

Second round
1	(Spain) R Nadal	6	6	6
WC	(Australia) T Kokkinakis	2	4	2
(United States) J Sock	6^{2}	5	2
25	(France) G Monfils	7^{7}	7	6
24	(Italy) A Seppi	4	6	3	6	5
(United States) D Young	6	2	6	4	7
Q	(Serbia) D Lajović	1	1	6^{3}
16	(Japan) K Nishikori	6	6	7^{7}

Third round
1	(Spain) R Nadal	6	6	6
25	(France) G Monfils	1	2	3
(United States) D Young	5	1	0
16	(Japan) K Nishikori	7	6	6

Fourth round
1	(Spain) R Nadal	7^{7}	7	7^{7}
16	(Japan) K Nishikori	6^{3}	5	6^{3}

==== Section 2 ====
First round
11	(Canada) M Raonic	7^{7}	6	4	6
(Spain) D Gimeno Traver	6^{2}	1	6	2
Q	(Germany) P Gojowczyk	6^{5}	6^{5}	3
(Romania) V Hănescu	7^{7}	7^{7}	6
Q	(Chinese Taipei) J Wang	3	2	1
(Chinese Taipei) Y-h Lu	6	6	6
(United States) B Klahn	7^{9}	4	4	3
22	(Bulgaria) G Dimitrov	6^{7}	6	6	6
27	(France) B Paire	7^{14}	6	6
Q	(Canada) F Dancevic	6^{12}	3	4
WC	(Australia) N Kyrgios	6	6^{5}	6	7^{7}
(Germany) B Becker	3	7^{7}	2	6^{2}
(Spain) R Bautista Agut	6	6	6
(United States) T Smyczek	2	1	1
Q	(United States) R Williams	7^{7}	3	4	4
5	(Argentina) JM del Potro	6^{1}	6	6	6

Second round
11	(Canada) M Raonic	7^{11}	6	6
(Romania) V Hănescu	6^{9}	4	4
(Chinese Taipei) Y-h Lu	3	3	6^{11}
22	(Bulgaria) G Dimitrov	6	6	7^{13}
27	(France) B Paire	6^{5}	6^{5}	6	6	6
WC	(Australia) N Kyrgios	7^{7}	7^{7}	4	2	2
(Spain) R Bautista Agut	4	6	5	6	7
5	(Argentina) JM del Potro	6	3	7	4	5

Third round
11	(Canada) M Raonic	3	6	4	6^{10}
22	(Bulgaria) G Dimitrov	6	3	6	7^{12}
27	(France) B Paire	2	1	4
(Spain) R Bautista Agut	6	6	6

Fourth round
22	(Bulgaria) G Dimitrov	6	3	6	6
(Spain) R Bautista Agut	3	6	2	4

==== Section 3 ====
First round
4	(United Kingdom) A Murray	6	6	6
(Japan) G Soeda	1	1	3
Q	(France) V Millot	7	4	6^{4}	6	6
Q	(United States) W Odesnik	5	6	7^{7}	1	3
Q	(Germany) M Berrer	6	7	6
(France) M Llodra	4	5	1
(India) S Devvarman	4	4	6^{2}
26	(Spain) F López	6	6	7^{7}
LL	(France) S Robert	7^{7}	6	6
(Slovenia) A Bedene	6^{3}	3	0
(Poland) M Przysiężny	6	7^{7}	7
(Argentina) H Zeballos	3	6^{4}	5
Q	(Slovenia) B Rola	6	6	7
(Argentina) F Delbonis	4	2	5
LL	(Slovakia) M Kližan	6	7^{8}	0
13	(United States) J Isner	2	6^{6}	0^{r}

Second round
4	(United Kingdom) A Murray	6	6	7
Q	(France) V Millot	2	2	5
Q	(Germany) M Berrer	4	6^{6}	4
26	(Spain) F López	6	7^{8}	6
LL	(France) S Robert	7^{7}	6	6^{3}	6
(Poland) M Przysiężny	6^{3}	1	7^{7}	1
Q	(Slovenia) B Rola	4	3	7	6^{2}
LL	(Slovakia) M Kližan	6	6	5	7^{7}

Third round
4	(United Kingdom) A Murray	7^{7}	6	6
26	(Spain) F López	6^{2}	4	2
LL	(France) S Robert	6	7^{7}	6
LL	(Slovakia) M Kližan	0	6^{2}	4

Fourth round
4	(United Kingdom) A Murray	6	6	6^{6}	6
LL	(France) S Robert	1	2	7^{8}	2

==== Section 4 ====
First round
10	(France) J-W Tsonga	7	6	6
(Italy) F Volandri	5	3	3
Q	(Brazil) T Bellucci	4	6	7^{7}	0
(Germany) J Reister	6	3	6^{5}	0^{r}
(Croatia) M Čilić	4	4	6	6	6
(Spain) M Granollers	6	6	3	3	2
(Germany) D Brands	7^{7}	4	6	3	14
18	(France) G Simon	6^{4}	6	3	6	16
31	(Spain) F Verdasco	5	6	6	6
Q	(China) Z Zhang	7	3	2	3
(Russia) T Gabashvili	6^{3}	6	6	6
(Ukraine) S Stakhovsky	7^{7}	4	2	0
(Czech Republic) R Štěpánek	7^{7}	6	1	0^{r}
(Slovenia) B Kavčič	6^{3}	4	6	2
WC	(Australia) J Duckworth	4	4	2
6	(Switzerland) R Federer	6	6	6

Second round
10	(France) J-W Tsonga	7^{8}	6	6
Q	(Brazil) T Bellucci	6^{6}	4	4
(Croatia) M Čilić	6	6^{3}	7^{8}	1	2
18	(France) G Simon	4	7^{7}	6^{6}	6	6
31	(Spain) F Verdasco	6^{1}	6	6	4	4
(Russia) T Gabashvili	7^{7}	3	2	6	6
(Slovenia) B Kavčič	2	1	6^{4}
6	(Switzerland) R Federer	6	6	7^{7}

Third round
10	(France) J-W Tsonga	7^{7}	6	6
18	(France) G Simon	6^{5}	4	2
(Russia) T Gabashvili	2	2	3
6	(Switzerland) R Federer	6	6	6

Fourth round
10	(France) J-W Tsonga	3	5	4
6	(Switzerland) R Federer	6	7	6

=== Bottom half ===
==== Section 5 ====
First round
7	(Czech Republic) T Berdych	6	6	6
(Kazakhstan) A Nedovyesov	3	4	3
WC	(China) D Wu	5	5	6^{2}
(France) K de Schepper	7	7	7^{7}
(Czech Republic) J Hájek	4	2	1
Q	(Bosnia and Herzegovina) D Džumhur	6	6	6
(Croatia) I Karlović	6^{8}	3	6^{4}
32	(Croatia) I Dodig	7^{10}	6	7^{7}
19	(South Africa) K Anderson	2	6^{4}	6	6	6
(Czech Republic) J Veselý	6	7^{7}	4	4	4
Q	(Austria) D Thiem	5	6	6	7^{7}
(Portugal) J Sousa	7	4	3	6^{3}
(Argentina) C Berlocq	4	6^{5}	7^{11}	2
(France) É Roger-Vasselin	6	7^{7}	6^{9}	6
(Spain) G García-López	7	5
12	(Germany) T Haas	5	2^{r}

Second round
7	(Czech Republic) T Berdych	6	6	6
(France) K de Schepper	4	1	3
Q	(Bosnia and Herzegovina) D Džumhur	4	4	6	4
32	(Croatia) I Dodig	6	6	3	1^{r}
19	(South Africa) K Anderson	6	6	6
Q	(Austria) D Thiem	4	3	4
(France) É Roger-Vasselin	7^{7}	6	4	6
(Spain) G García-López	6^{1}	4	6	1

Third round
7	(Czech Republic) T Berdych	6	6	6
Q	(Bosnia and Herzegovina) D Džumhur	4	2	2
19	(South Africa) K Anderson	3	4	6	7^{7}	7
(France) É Roger-Vasselin	6	6	3	6^{5}	5

Fourth round
7	(Czech Republic) T Berdych	6	6	6
19	(South Africa) K Anderson	2	2	3

==== Section 6 ====
First round
14	(Russia) M Youzhny	6	6	6
(Germany) J-L Struff	1	4	2
(Germany) F Mayer	6	6	6
Q	(United States) D Kudla	4	2	4
(Spain) A Ramos	4	2	4
(Spain) P Andújar	6	6	6
WC	(Australia) J Thompson	6	6	4	2	1
20	(Poland) J Janowicz	1	4	6	6	6
29	(France) J Chardy	6	6	6
(Netherlands) J Huta Galung	2	4	4
Q	(Lithuania) R Berankis	5	5	2
(Ukraine) A Dolgopolov	7	7	6
WC	(United States) S Johnson	6	3	0	7	4
(France) A Mannarino	3	6	6	5	6
(Colombia) A González	3	4	4
3	(Spain) D Ferrer	6	6	6

Second round
14	(Russia) M Youzhny	4	6	3	6	3
(Germany) F Mayer	6	3	6	3	6
(Spain) P Andújar	6	6^{3}	6^{5}	3
20	(Poland) J Janowicz	4	7^{7}	7^{7}	6
29	(France) J Chardy	7	7^{7}	6^{3}	7^{7}
(Ukraine) A Dolgopolov	5	6^{5}	7^{7}	6^{5}
(France) A Mannarino	6^{2}	7	0	3
3	(Spain) D Ferrer	7^{7}	5	6	6

Third round
(Germany) F Mayer	7	6	6
20	(Poland) J Janowicz	5	2	2
29	(France) J Chardy	2	6^{5}	2
3	(Spain) D Ferrer	6	7^{7}	6

Fourth round
(Germany) F Mayer	7^{7}	5	2	1
3	(Spain) D Ferrer	6^{5}	7	6	6

==== Section 7 ====
First round
8	(Switzerland) S Wawrinka	6	4
(Kazakhstan) A Golubev	4	1^{r}
(Colombia) A Falla	6^{2}	6	6	6
(Kazakhstan) M Kukushkin	7^{7}	2	2	3
(France) N Mahut	3	5	6	6	3
(Australia) M Ebden	6	7	4	0	6
WC	(Australia) S Groth	4	3	4
28	(Canada) V Pospisil	6	6	6
17	(Spain) T Robredo	6	6^{7}	3	7^{7}	8
(Czech Republic) L Rosol	1	7^{9}	6	6^{5}	6
(Spain) P Carreño	3	6	6	1	2
(France) J Benneteau	6	3	4	6	6
(Russia) N Davydenko	3	6	3	6	6
(Poland) Ł Kubot	6	3	6	3	4
Q	(France) D Guez	5	4	1
9	(France) R Gasquet	7	6	6

Second round
8	(Switzerland) S Wawrinka	6	6	6^{4}	6
(Colombia) A Falla	3	3	7^{7}	4
(Australia) M Ebden	6	6^{6}	6^{9}	1
28	(Canada) V Pospisil	3	7^{8}	7^{11}	6
17	(Spain) T Robredo	6	6^{4}	6	7^{8}
(France) J Benneteau	3	7^{7}	1	6^{6}
(Russia) N Davydenko	6^{3}	4	4
9	(France) R Gasquet	7^{7}	6	6

Third round
8	(Switzerland) S Wawrinka	w/o
28	(Canada) V Pospisil
17	(Spain) T Robredo	2	7	6	7^{8}
9	(France) R Gasquet	6	5	4	6^{6}

Fourth round
8	(Switzerland) S Wawrinka	6	7^{7}	7^{7}
17	(Spain) T Robredo	3	6^{3}	6^{5}

==== Section 8 ====
First round
15	(Italy) F Fognini	6	6	0
(Russia) A Bogomolov Jr.	3	2	0^{r}
(Israel) D Sela	6	6^{3}	7^{7}	3	3
(Finland) J Nieminen	3	7^{7}	6^{3}	6	6
(Colombia) S Giraldo	3	2	6	6^{3}
(United States) S Querrey	6	6	3	7^{7}
(Argentina) J Mónaco	6	4	6^{4}	2
23	(Latvia) E Gulbis	1	6	7^{7}	6
30	(Russia) D Tursunov	6	6	6
(United States) M Russell	2	2	3
(Cyprus) M Baghdatis	4	5	4
(Uzbekistan) D Istomin	6	7	6
(Argentina) L Mayer	6	6	6
(Spain) A Montañés	1	3	1
(Slovakia) L Lacko	3	6^{2}	1
2	(Serbia) N Djokovic	6	7^{7}	6

Second round
15	(Italy) F Fognini	7	6	3	6
(Finland) J Nieminen	5	4	6	2
(United States) S Querrey	6	6	6
23	(Latvia) E Gulbis	2	3	4
30	(Russia) D Tursunov	6^{3}	6	1	4
(Uzbekistan) D Istomin	7^{7}	4	6	6
(Argentina) L Mayer	0	4	4
2	(Serbia) N Djokovic	6	6	6

Third round
15	(Italy) F Fognini	7	6	6
(United States) S Querrey	5	4	4
(Uzbekistan) D Istomin	3	3	5
2	(Serbia) N Djokovic	6	6	7

Fourth round
15	(Italy) F Fognini	3	0	2
2	(Serbia) N Djokovic	6	6	6

Preceded by 2013 US Open – Men's singles	Grand Slam men's singles	Succeeded by 2014 French Open – Men's singles
