= 2014 Australian Open – Men's doubles =

Tennis tournament

Men's doubles
- 2014 Australian Open

Final
- Champions: (Poland) Łukasz Kubot (Sweden) Robert Lindstedt
- Runners-up: (United States) Eric Butorac (South Africa) Raven Klaasen
- Score: 6–3, 6–3

Details
- Draw: 64
- Seeds: 16

Events
| Singles | men | women | | boys | girls |
| Doubles | men | women | mixed | boys | girls |
| WC Singles | men | women | quad |
| WC Doubles | men | women | quad |
| Legends | men | women | mixed |
- Australian Open

Bob and Mike Bryan were the defending champions at the time of the finals, but lost in the third round to Eric Butorac and Raven Klaasen.
Łukasz Kubot and Robert Lindstedt won the title, defeating Butorac and Klaasen in the final, 6–3, 6–3.

== Seeds ==
1. (United States) Bob Bryan / (United States) Mike Bryan (third round)
2. (Austria) Alexander Peya / (Brazil) Bruno Soares (third round)
3. (Spain) David Marrero / (Spain) Fernando Verdasco (second round)
4. (Croatia) Ivan Dodig / (Brazil) Marcelo Melo (third round)
5. (India) Leander Paes / (Czech Republic) Radek Štěpánek (quarterfinals)
6. (Spain) Marcel Granollers / (Spain) Marc López (second round)
7. (India) Rohan Bopanna / (Pakistan) Aisam-ul-Haq Qureshi (third round)
8. (Canada) Daniel Nestor / (Serbia) Nenad Zimonjić (semifinals)
9. (Poland) Mariusz Fyrstenberg / (Poland) Marcin Matkowski (third round)
10. (Netherlands) Jean-Julien Rojer / (Romania) Horia Tecău (second round)
11. (France) Julien Benneteau / (France) Édouard Roger-Vasselin (third round)
12. (Philippines) Treat Conrad Huey / (United Kingdom) Dominic Inglot (quarterfinals)
13. (France) Michaël Llodra / (France) Nicolas Mahut (semifinals)
14. (Poland) Łukasz Kubot / (Sweden) Robert Lindstedt (champions)
15. (United Kingdom) Jamie Murray / (Australia) John Peers (second round)
16. (Mexico) Santiago González / (United States) Scott Lipsky (first round)

== Draw ==
Key

- Q = Qualifier
- WC = Wild card
- LL = Lucky loser
- Alt = Alternate
- ITF = ITF entry
- PR = Protected ranking
- SR = Special ranking
- SE = Special exempt
- JE = Junior exempt
- JR = Junior Accelerator Programme entrant
- CO = College Accelerator Programme entrant
- NG = Next Gen Accelerator Program entrant
- w/o = Walkover
- r = Retired
- d = Defaulted

=== Finals ===
Quarterfinals
(United States) Eric Butorac (South Africa) Raven Klaasen | 6^{3} | 7^{8} | 6
12 | (Philippines) Treat Conrad Huey (United Kingdom) Dominic Inglot | 7^{7} | 6^{6} | 4
WC | (Australia) Alex Bolt (Australia) Andrew Whittington | 2 | 6^{1}
8 | (Canada) Daniel Nestor (Serbia) Nenad Zimonjić | 6 | 7^{7}
(Belarus) Max Mirnyi (Russia) Mikhail Youzhny | 4 | 7 | 2
14 | (Poland) Łukasz Kubot (Sweden) Robert Lindstedt | 6 | 5 | 6
5 | (India) Leander Paes (Czech Republic) Radek Štěpánek | 2 | 6^{4}
13 | (France) Michaël Llodra (France) Nicolas Mahut | 6 | 7^{7}

Semifinals
(United States) Eric Butorac (South Africa) Raven Klaasen | 6 | 6
8 | (Canada) Daniel Nestor (Serbia) Nenad Zimonjić | 2 | 4
14 | (Poland) Łukasz Kubot (Sweden) Robert Lindstedt | 6 | 6^{12} | 6
13 | (France) Michaël Llodra (France) Nicolas Mahut | 4 | 7^{14} | 3

Final
(United States) Eric Butorac (South Africa) Raven Klaasen | 3 | 3
14 | (Poland) Łukasz Kubot (Sweden) Robert Lindstedt | 6 | 6

=== Top half ===
==== Section 1 ====
First round
1 | (United States) B Bryan (United States) M Bryan | 6 | 7^{7}
(Australia) P Hanley (United Kingdom) J Marray | 4 | 6^{3}
(Netherlands) R Haase (Germany) C Kas | 4 | 6 | 7
(Russia) N Davydenko (Kazakhstan) A Golubev | 6 | 2 | 5
WC | (Australia) L Hewitt (Australia) P Rafter | 4 | 5
(United States) E Butorac (South Africa) R Klaasen | 6 | 7
WC | (Australia) M Reid (Australia) L Saville | 6^{4} | 6^{6}
15 | (United Kingdom) J Murray (Australia) J Peers | 7^{7} | 7^{8}
12 | (Philippines) TC Huey (United Kingdom) D Inglot | 4 | 6 | 6
(Colombia) JS Cabal (Colombia) R Farah | 6 | 4 | 3
(Germany) T Kamke (Germany) F Mayer | 6^{1} | 4
(Italy) A Seppi (Italy) P Starace | 7^{7} | 6
(Australia) M Matosevic (Poland) M Przysiężny | 6 | 4 | 0
PR | (United Kingdom) C Fleming (United Kingdom) R Hutchins | 4 | 6 | 6
(Australia) R Junaid (France) A Mannarino | 3 | 6 | 6^{5}
7 | (India) R Bopanna (Pakistan) A-u-H Qureshi | 6 | 4 | 7^{7}

Second round
1 | (United States) B Bryan (United States) M Bryan | 6 | 6
(Netherlands) R Haase (Germany) C Kas | 3 | 2
(United States) E Butorac (South Africa) R Klaasen | 6 | 6
15 | (United Kingdom) J Murray (Australia) J Peers | 4 | 4
12 | (Philippines) TC Huey (United Kingdom) D Inglot | 6 | 6^{5} | 6
(Italy) A Seppi (Italy) P Starace | 3 | 7^{7} | 1
PR | (United Kingdom) C Fleming (United Kingdom) R Hutchins | 6 | 3 | 2
7 | (India) R Bopanna (Pakistan) A-u-H Qureshi | 4 | 6 | 6

Third round
1 | (United States) B Bryan (United States) M Bryan | 6^{9} | 4
(United States) E Butorac (South Africa) R Klaasen | 7^{11} | 6
12 | (Philippines) TC Huey (United Kingdom) D Inglot | 6 | 7^{7}
7 | (India) R Bopanna (Pakistan) A-u-H Qureshi | 4 | 6^{1}

Quarterfinals
(United States) E Butorac (South Africa) R Klaasen | 6^{3} | 7^{8} | 6
12 | (Philippines) TC Huey (United Kingdom) D Inglot | 7^{7} | 6^{6} | 4

==== Section 2 ====
First round
3 | (Spain) D Marrero (Spain) F Verdasco | 3 | 6 | 6
WC | (Australia) J Duckworth (Australia) M Ebden | 6 | 3 | 2
WC | (Australia) A Bolt (Australia) A Whittington | 1
(Austria) J Knowle (Canada) V Pospisil | 2^{r}
(Germany) D Brown (France) G Monfils | 4 | 6 | 4
(Spain) P Carreño Busta (Spain) G García López | 6 | 2 | 6
(Austria) O Marach (Romania) F Mergea | 6 | 7^{8}
16 | (Mexico) S González (United States) S Lipsky | 3 | 6^{6}
9 | (Poland) M Fyrstenberg (Poland) M Matkowski | 7 | 7
(Poland) T Bednarek (Croatia) I Karlović | 5 | 5
(Finland) J Nieminen (Russia) D Tursunov | 7^{7} | 6
(Germany) A Begemann (Germany) M Emmrich | 6^{3} | 4
(Croatia) M Draganja (Croatia) M Pavić | 7^{7} | 6
(France) M Gicquel (France) B Paire | 6^{0} | 3
(Germany) B Becker (Germany) D Brands | 4 | 3
8 | (Canada) D Nestor (Serbia) N Zimonjić | 6 | 6

Second round
3 | (Spain) D Marrero (Spain) F Verdasco | 6^{4} | 3
WC | (Australia) A Bolt (Australia) A Whittington | 7^{7} | 6
(Spain) P Carreño Busta (Spain) G García López | 7^{7} | 6
(Austria) O Marach (Romania) F Mergea | 6^{3} | 3
9 | (Poland) M Fyrstenberg (Poland) M Matkowski | 5 | 7 | 7^{7}
(Finland) J Nieminen (Russia) D Tursunov | 7 | 5 | 6^{4}
(Croatia) M Draganja (Croatia) M Pavić | 5 | 1
8 | (Canada) D Nestor (Serbia) N Zimonjić | 7 | 6

Third round
WC | (Australia) A Bolt (Australia) A Whittington | 6^{4} | 7^{7} | 7
(Spain) P Carreño Busta (Spain) G García López | 7^{7} | 6^{5} | 5
9 | (Poland) M Fyrstenberg (Poland) M Matkowski | 4 | 7^{7} | 3
8 | (Canada) D Nestor (Serbia) N Zimonjić | 6 | 6^{5} | 6

Quarterfinals
WC | (Australia) A Bolt (Australia) A Whittington | 2 | 6^{1}
8 | (Canada) D Nestor (Serbia) N Zimonjić | 6 | 7^{7}

=== Bottom half ===
==== Section 3 ====
First round
6 | (Spain) M Granollers (Spain) M López | 6 | 6
(Australia) S Groth (Australia) J-P Smith | 4 | 4
(United States) N Monroe (Argentina) H Zeballos | 3 | 6^{7}
(Belarus) M Mirnyi (Russia) M Youzhny | 6 | 7^{9}
(Sweden) J Brunström (Denmark) F Nielsen | 6 | 6
(Chinese Taipei) Y-h Lu (India) D Sharan | 2 | 4
(Russia) M Elgin (Uzbekistan) D Istomin | 2 | 4
11 | (France) J Benneteau (France) É Roger-Vasselin | 6 | 6
14 | (Poland) Ł Kubot (Sweden) R Lindstedt | 6 | 6
(Argentina) F Delbonis (Spain) A Ramos | 3 | 2
(Argentina) C Berlocq (Colombia) A González | 7 | 3 | 4
WC | (Australia) B Mitchell (Australia) J Thompson | 5 | 6 | 6
(Italy) S Bolelli (Italy) F Fognini | 6 | 7
(United States) R Harrison (United States) S Querrey | 2 | 5
WC | (Australia) C Guccione (Australia) T Kokkinakis | 5 | 6^{5}
4 | (Croatia) I Dodig (Brazil) M Melo | 7 | 7^{7}

Second round
6 | (Spain) M Granollers (Spain) M López | 6 | 3 | 6^{3}
(Belarus) M Mirnyi (Russia) M Youzhny | 4 | 6 | 7^{7}
(Sweden) J Brunström (Denmark) F Nielsen | 6 | 5 | 3
11 | (France) J Benneteau (France) É Roger-Vasselin | 0 | 7 | 6
14 | (Poland) Ł Kubot (Sweden) R Lindstedt | 6 | 6
WC | (Australia) B Mitchell (Australia) J Thompson | 1 | 3
(Italy) S Bolelli (Italy) F Fognini | 6 | 1 | 4
4 | (Croatia) I Dodig (Brazil) M Melo | 2 | 6 | 6

Third round
(Belarus) M Mirnyi (Russia) M Youzhny | 6 | 4 | 6
11 | (France) J Benneteau (France) É Roger-Vasselin | 2 | 6 | 3
14 | (Poland) Ł Kubot (Sweden) R Lindstedt | 5 | 6 | 6
4 | (Croatia) I Dodig (Brazil) M Melo | 7 | 4 | 4

Quarterfinals
(Belarus) M Mirnyi (Russia) M Youzhny | 4 | 7 | 2
14 | (Poland) Ł Kubot (Sweden) R Lindstedt | 6 | 5 | 6

==== Section 4 ====
First round
5 | (India) L Paes (Czech Republic) R Štěpánek | 6 | 6
(Czech Republic) L Dlouhý (Czech Republic) L Rosol | 4 | 1
(Italy) D Bracciali (Ukraine) A Dolgopolov | 7^{7} | 4 | 6
PR | (Israel) J Erlich (Israel) A Ram | 6^{4} | 6 | 3
WC | (India) Y Bhambri (New Zealand) M Venus | 6 | 7
(Spain) R Bautista Agut (Spain) D Gimeno Traver | 2 | 5
(Russia) T Gabashvili (Kazakhstan) M Kukushkin | 2 | 5
10 | (Netherlands) J-J Rojer (Romania) H Tecău | 6 | 7
13 | (France) M Llodra (France) N Mahut | 6 | 7
(Spain) P Andújar (Argentina) L Mayer | 3 | 5
(Netherlands) J Huta Galung (Netherlands) I Sijsling | 6 | 6^{5} | 2
(Austria) P Oswald (Germany) S Stadler | 3 | 7^{7} | 6
(India) M Bhupathi (United States) R Ram | 4 | 6 | 6
(Colombia) S Giraldo (Portugal) J Sousa | 6 | 3 | 4
(Spain) F López (Brazil) A Sá | 4 | 4
2 | (Austria) A Peya (Brazil) B Soares | 6 | 6

Second round
5 | (India) L Paes (Czech Republic) R Štěpánek | 6 | 6
(Italy) D Bracciali (Ukraine) A Dolgopolov | 1 | 4
WC | (India) Y Bhambri (New Zealand) M Venus | 6 | 6
10 | (Netherlands) J-J Rojer (Romania) H Tecău | 4 | 4
13 | (France) M Llodra (France) N Mahut | 7^{7} | 7^{7}
(Austria) P Oswald (Germany) S Stadler | 6^{5} | 6^{2}
(India) M Bhupathi (United States) R Ram | 4 | 6^{7}
2 | (Austria) A Peya (Brazil) B Soares | 6 | 7^{9}

Third round
5 | (India) L Paes (Czech Republic) R Štěpánek | 6 | 6
WC | (India) Y Bhambri (New Zealand) M Venus | 3 | 2
13 | (France) M Llodra (France) N Mahut | 7^{7} | 6
2 | (Austria) A Peya (Brazil) B Soares | 6^{4} | 4

Quarterfinals
5 | (India) L Paes (Czech Republic) R Štěpánek | 2 | 6^{4}
13 | (France) M Llodra (France) N Mahut | 6 | 7^{7}
