= 2014 Australian Open – Women's singles =

Women's singles
- 2014 Australian Open

Final
- Champion: (China) Li Na
- Runner-up: (Slovakia) Dominika Cibulková
- Score: 7–6^{(7–3)}, 6–0

Details
- Draw: 128 (12Q / 8WC)
- Seeds: 32

Events
Singles	men	women		boys	girls
Doubles	men	women	mixed	boys	girls
WC Singles	men	women	quad
WC Doubles	men	women	quad
Legends	men	women	mixed
- Australian Open

Li Na defeated Dominika Cibulková in the final, 7–6^{(7–3)}, 6–0 to win the women's singles tennis title at the 2014 Australian Open. It was her first Australian Open title (following two runner-up finishes at the event in 2011 and 2013) and her second and last major singles title. Li saved a match point en route to the title, in the third round against Lucie Šafářová, and became the first Asian champion at the Australian Open.

Victoria Azarenka was the two-time defending champion and was attempting to become the first woman to win three consecutive Australian Open singles titles since Martina Hingis in 1999, but was defeated by Agnieszka Radwańska in the quarterfinals.

By winning her third-round match, Serena Williams surpassed Margaret Court's record of 60 match victories at the Australian Open. She lost to Ana Ivanovic in the fourth round, ending her 25-match winning streak dating back to the 2013 US Open.

Eugenie Bouchard was the first Canadian to reach a major semifinal since Carling Bassett-Seguso at the 1984 US Open.

This event marked the first major main draw appearance for future world No. 4 and Olympic gold medalist Belinda Bencic, who lost to Li in the second round. In her previous match, Bencic knocked out 43 year old Kimiko Date, the oldest player in the draw, with Bencic herself being the second youngest player at 16.

== Seeds ==
1. (United States) Serena Williams (fourth round)
2. (Belarus) Victoria Azarenka (quarterfinals)
3. (Russia) Maria Sharapova (fourth round)
4. (China) Li Na (champion)
5. (Poland) Agnieszka Radwańska (semifinals)
6. (Czech Republic) Petra Kvitová (first round)
7. (Italy) Sara Errani (first round)
8. (Serbia) Jelena Janković (fourth round)
9. (Germany) Angelique Kerber (fourth round)
10. (Denmark) Caroline Wozniacki (third round)
11. (Romania) Simona Halep (quarterfinals)
12. (Italy) Roberta Vinci (first round)
13. (United States) Sloane Stephens (fourth round)
14. (Serbia) Ana Ivanovic (quarterfinals)
15. (Germany) Sabine Lisicki (second round)
16. (Spain) Carla Suárez Navarro (third round)
17. (Australia) Samantha Stosur (third round)

18. (Belgium) Kirsten Flipkens (second round)
19. (Russia) Svetlana Kuznetsova (first round)
20. (Slovakia) Dominika Cibulková (final)
21. (Romania) Sorana Cîrstea (first round)
22. (Russia) Ekaterina Makarova (fourth round)
23. (Russia) Elena Vesnina (first round)
24. (Estonia) Kaia Kanepi (first round)
25. (France) Alizé Cornet (third round)
26. (Czech Republic) Lucie Šafářová (third round)
27. (United States) Jamie Hampton (withdrew because of a hip injury)
28. (Italy) Flavia Pennetta (quarterfinals)
29. (Russia) Anastasia Pavlyuchenkova (third round)
30. (Canada) Eugenie Bouchard (semifinals)
31. (Slovakia) Daniela Hantuchová (third round)
32. (Slovakia) Magdaléna Rybáriková (second round)
33. (Serbia) Bojana Jovanovski (second round)

Click on the seed number of a player to go to their draw section.

== Draw ==
Key

- Q = Qualifier
- WC = Wild card
- LL = Lucky loser
- Alt = Alternate
- ITF = ITF entry
- PR = Protected ranking
- SR = Special ranking
- SE = Special exempt
- JE = Junior exempt
- JR = Junior Accelerator Programme entrant
- CO = College Accelerator Programme entrant
- NG = Next Gen Accelerator Program entrant
- w/o = Walkover
- r = Retired
- d = Defaulted

=== Finals ===
Quarterfinals
14	(Serbia) Ana Ivanovic	7	5	2
30	(Canada) Eugenie Bouchard	5	7	6
4	(China) Li Na	6	6
28	(Italy) Flavia Pennetta	2	2
11	(Romania) Simona Halep	3	0
20	(Slovakia) Dominika Cibulková	6	6
5	(Poland) Agnieszka Radwańska	6	5	6
2	(Belarus) Victoria Azarenka	1	7	0

Semifinals
30	(Canada) Eugenie Bouchard	2	4
4	(China) Li Na	6	6
20	(Slovakia) Dominika Cibulková	6	6
5	(Poland) Agnieszka Radwańska	1	2

Final
4	(China) Li Na	7^{7}	6
20	(Slovakia) Dominika Cibulková	6^{3}	0

=== Top half ===
==== Section 1 ====
First round
1	(United States) S Williams	6	6
WC	(Australia) A Barty	2	1
(Serbia) V Dolonc	2	6	6
(Spain) L Arruabarrena	6	2	4
WC	(France) P Parmentier	0	1
(Czech Republic) Ka Plíšková	6	6
Q	(United Kingdom) H Watson	5	6	3
31	(Slovakia) D Hantuchová	7	3	6
17	(Australia) S Stosur	6	6
(Czech Republic) K Zakopalová	3	4
(Bulgaria) T Pironkova	6	6
(Spain) S Soler Espinosa	3	2
(Germany) A Beck	6	6
(Croatia) P Martić	0	0
(Netherlands) K Bertens	4	4
14	(Serbia) A Ivanovic	6	6

Second round
1	(United States) S Williams	6	6
(Serbia) V Dolonc	1	2
(Czech Republic) Ka Plíšková	3	6	10
31	(Slovakia) D Hantuchová	6	3	12
17	(Australia) S Stosur	6	6
(Bulgaria) T Pironkova	2	0
(Germany) A Beck	1	2
14	(Serbia) A Ivanovic	6	6

Third round
1	(United States) S Williams	6	6
31	(Slovakia) D Hantuchová	3	3
17	(Australia) S Stosur	7^{10}	4	2
14	(Serbia) A Ivanovic	6^{8}	6	6

Fourth round
1	(United States) S Williams	6	3	3
14	(Serbia) A Ivanovic	4	6	6

==== Section 2 ====
First round
12	(Italy) R Vinci	4	3
(China) J Zheng	6	6
(Austria) P Mayr-Achleitner	2	7^{10}	7
(United States) M Keys	6	6^{8}	9
WC	(Australia) C Dellacqua	6	6
PR	(Russia) V Zvonareva	2	2
(United Kingdom) L Robson	3	0
18	(Belgium) K Flipkens	6	6
30	(Canada) E Bouchard	7	6
WC	(China) H Tang	5	1
(Belgium) A Van Uytvanck	6^{3}	6^{3}
(France) V Razzano	7^{7}	7^{7}
WC	(United States) S Vickery	3	3
(United States) L Davis	6	6
(Germany) J Görges	6	6
7	(Italy) S Errani	3	2

Second round
(China) J Zheng	7^{7}	1	7
(United States) M Keys	6^{5}	6	5
WC	(Australia) C Dellacqua	6	6
18	(Belgium) K Flipkens	3	0
30	(Canada) E Bouchard	6	7^{12}
(France) V Razzano	2	6^{10}
(United States) L Davis	7	2	6
(Germany) J Görges	5	6	4

Third round
(China) J Zheng	2	4
WC	(Australia) C Dellacqua	6	6
30	(Canada) E Bouchard	6	6
(United States) L Davis	2	2

Fourth round
WC	(Australia) C Dellacqua	7^{7}	2	0
30	(Canada) E Bouchard	6^{5}	6	6

==== Section 3 ====
First round
4	(China) N Li	6	6
Q	(Croatia) A Konjuh	2	0
Q	(Switzerland) B Bencic	6	4	6
(Japan) K Date-Krumm	4	6	3
(Croatia) D Vekić	3	1
Q	(Czech Republic) L Hradecká	6	6
(Israel) J Glushko	5	6	1
26	(Czech Republic) L Šafářová	7	3	6
22	(Russia) E Makarova	2	6	6
(United States) V Williams	6	4	4
(Spain) A Medina Garrigues	3	1
LL	(United States) I Falconi	6	6
(Israel) S Pe'er	4	1
(Romania) M Niculescu	6	6
(Croatia) M Lučić-Baroni	2	1
15	(Germany) S Lisicki	6	6

Second round
4	(China) N Li	6	7^{7}
Q	(Switzerland) B Bencic	0	6^{5}
Q	(Czech Republic) L Hradecká	7^{7}	3	0
26	(Czech Republic) L Šafářová	6^{4}	6	6
22	(Russia) E Makarova	6	7
LL	(United States) I Falconi	2	5
(Romania) M Niculescu	2	6	6
15	(Germany) S Lisicki	6	2	2

Third round
4	(China) N Li	1	7^{7}	6
26	(Czech Republic) L Šafářová	6	6^{2}	3
22	(Russia) E Makarova	6	6
(Romania) M Niculescu	4	4

Fourth round
4	(China) N Li	6	6
22	(Russia) E Makarova	2	0

==== Section 4 ====
First round
9	(Germany) A Kerber	6	0	6
WC	(Australia) J Gajdošová	3	6	2
(France) C Garcia	2	6^{7}
Q	(Russia) A Kudryavtseva	6	7^{9}
(Germany) D Pfizenmaier	6^{5}	3
(Belgium) Y Wickmayer	7^{7}	6
(United States) A Riske	6	6
23	(Russia) E Vesnina	2	2
28	(Italy) F Pennetta	6	6
(Romania) A Cadanțu	0	2
(Puerto Rico) M Puig	6	6
Q	(Georgia (country)) A Tatishvili	2	4
(China) S Zhang	6^{4}	3
(Germany) M Barthel	7^{7}	6
(Thailand) L Kumkhum	6	1	6
6	(Czech Republic) P Kvitová	2	6	4

Second round
9	(Germany) A Kerber	6	6
Q	(Russia) A Kudryavtseva	4	2
(Belgium) Y Wickmayer	1	1
(United States) A Riske	6	6
28	(Italy) F Pennetta	6	6
(Puerto Rico) M Puig	3	4
(Germany) M Barthel	4	6	6
(Thailand) L Kumkhum	6	3	4

Third round
9	(Germany) A Kerber	6	6
(United States) A Riske	3	4
28	(Italy) F Pennetta	6	7
(Germany) M Barthel	1	5

Fourth round
9	(Germany) A Kerber	1	6	5
28	(Italy) F Pennetta	6	4	7

=== Bottom half ===
==== Section 5 ====
First round
8	(Serbia) J Janković	6	6
(Japan) M Doi	1	2
(Ukraine) N Kichenok	2	6^{5}
(Japan) A Morita	6	7^{7}
(Japan) K Nara	7	4	6
(China) S Peng	5	6	3
(Germany) A Petkovic	2	3
32	(Slovakia) M Rybáriková	6	6
21	(Romania) S Cîrstea	4	6^{6}
(New Zealand) M Erakovic	6	7^{8}
Q	(Kazakhstan) Z Diyas	6	6
Q	(Czech Republic) K Siniaková	2	4
(Ukraine) L Tsurenko	6	3	4
(United States) V Lepchenko	2	6	6
Q	(Poland) K Piter	0	1
11	(Romania) S Halep	6	6

Second round
8	(Serbia) J Janković	6	6
(Japan) A Morita	2	0
(Japan) K Nara	6	6
32	(Slovakia) M Rybáriková	4	3
(New Zealand) M Erakovic	4	0
Q	(Kazakhstan) Z Diyas	6	6
(United States) V Lepchenko	6	0	1
11	(Romania) S Halep	4	6	6

Third round
8	(Serbia) J Janković	6	7
(Japan) K Nara	4	5
Q	(Kazakhstan) Z Diyas	1	4
11	(Romania) S Halep	6	6

Fourth round
8	(Serbia) J Janković	4	6	0
11	(Romania) S Halep	6	2	6

==== Section 6 ====
First round
16	(Spain) C Suárez Navarro	6	6
(United States) V King	3	2
(Kazakhstan) G Voskoboeva	7	4	7
Q	(Romania) I-C Begu	5	6	5
(France) K Mladenovic	5	5
(Switzerland) S Vögele	7	7
(Italy) F Schiavone	3	4
20	(Slovakia) D Cibulková	6	6
25	(France) A Cornet	1
(Slovenia) P Hercog	0^{r}
(Italy) C Giorgi	4	6	6
WC	(Australia) S Sanders	6	1	4
(Argentina) P Ormaechea	4	2
(Italy) K Knapp	6	6
(United States) B Mattek-Sands	3	4
3	(Russia) M Sharapova	6	6

Second round
16	(Spain) C Suárez Navarro	7^{7}	3	8
(Kazakhstan) G Voskoboeva	6^{2}	6	6
(Switzerland) S Vögele	0	1
20	(Slovakia) D Cibulková	6	6
25	(France) A Cornet	6	4	6
(Italy) C Giorgi	3	6	4
(Italy) K Knapp	3	6	8
3	(Russia) M Sharapova	6	4	10

Third round
16	(Spain) C Suárez Navarro	1	0
20	(Slovakia) D Cibulková	6	6
25	(France) A Cornet	1	6^{6}
3	(Russia) M Sharapova	6	7^{8}

Fourth round
20	(Slovakia) D Cibulková	3	6	6
3	(Russia) M Sharapova	6	4	1

==== Section 7 ====
First round
5	(Poland) A Radwańska	6	5	6
(Kazakhstan) Y Putintseva	0	7	2
(Belarus) O Govortsova	6	7^{8}
Q	(China) Y Duan	0	6^{6}
Q	(Germany) C Witthöft	1	4
(Luxembourg) M Minella	6	6
(Brazil) T Pereira	6^{7}	4
29	(Russia) A Pavlyuchenkova	7^{9}	6
24	(Estonia) K Kanepi	2	6	2
(Spain) G Muguruza	6	2	6
(Hungary) T Babos	6	4	5
(Slovakia) AK Schmiedlová	4	6	7
(United States) C McHale	7	6
PR	(Chinese Taipei) Y-j Chan	5	4
(Spain) L Domínguez Lino	0	2
10	(Denmark) C Wozniacki	6	6

Second round
5	(Poland) A Radwańska	6	7
(Belarus) O Govortsova	0	5
(Luxembourg) M Minella	2	2
29	(Russia) A Pavlyuchenkova	6	6
(Spain) G Muguruza	6	6
(Slovakia) AK Schmiedlová	3	3
(United States) C McHale	0	6	2
10	(Denmark) C Wozniacki	6	1	6

Third round
5	(Poland) A Radwańska	5	6	6
29	(Russia) A Pavlyuchenkova	7	2	2
(Spain) G Muguruza	4	7	6
10	(Denmark) C Wozniacki	6	5	3

Fourth round
5	(Poland) A Radwańska	6	6
(Spain) G Muguruza	1	3

==== Section 8 ====
First round
13	(United States) S Stephens	7^{7}	6
(Kazakhstan) Y Shvedova	6^{1}	3
(Slovenia) T Majerič	6	6^{1}	4
(Croatia) A Tomljanović	3	7^{7}	6
WC	(Australia) O Rogowska	6	6
(Colombia) M Duque	3	3
(Ukraine) E Svitolina	6	6
19	(Russia) S Kuznetsova	3	3
33	(Serbia) B Jovanovski	6^{1}	6	6
(Slovakia) J Čepelová	7^{7}	1	3
(South Africa) C Scheepers	6^{3}	4
(Austria) Y Meusburger	7^{7}	6
(Chinese Taipei) S-w Hsieh	1	6	1
(Czech Republic) B Záhlavová-Strýcová	6	4	6
(Sweden) J Larsson	6^{2}	2
2	(Belarus) V Azarenka	7^{7}	6

Second round
13	(United States) S Stephens	3	6	7
(Croatia) A Tomljanović	6	2	5
WC	(Australia) O Rogowska	4	5
(Ukraine) E Svitolina	6	7
33	(Serbia) B Jovanovski	6	3	2
(Austria) Y Meusburger	3	6	6
(Czech Republic) B Záhlavová-Strýcová	1	4
2	(Belarus) V Azarenka	6	6

Third round
13	(United States) S Stephens	7	6
(Ukraine) E Svitolina	5	4
(Austria) Y Meusburger	1	0
2	(Belarus) V Azarenka	6	6

Fourth round
13	(United States) S Stephens	3	2
2	(Belarus) V Azarenka	6	6

== Championship match statistics ==
Category	(China) Li	(Slovakia) Cibulková
1st serve %	36/60 (60%)	49/73 (67%)
1st serve points won	21 of 36 = 58%	29 of 49 = 59%
2nd serve points won	15 of 24 = 63%	5 of 24 = 21%
Total service points won	36 of 60 = 60.00%	34 of 73 = 46.58%
Aces	2	0
Double faults	3	7
Winners	30	11
Unforced errors	28	22
Net points won	7 of 12 = 58%	2 of 3 = 67%
Break points converted	5 of 10 = 50%	2 of 3 = 67%
Return points won	39 of 73 = 53%	24 of 60 = 40%
Total points won	75	58

Preceded by 2013 US Open – Women's singles	Grand Slam women's singles	Succeeded by 2014 French Open – Women's singles
