= 2014 Australian Open – Women's doubles =

Women's doubles
- 2014 Australian Open

Final
- Champions: (Italy) Sara Errani (Italy) Roberta Vinci
- Runners-up: (Russia) Ekaterina Makarova (Russia) Elena Vesnina
- Score: 6–4, 3–6, 7–5

Details
- Draw: 64
- Seeds: 16

Events
Singles	men	women		boys	girls
Doubles	men	women	mixed	boys	girls
WC Singles	men	women	quad
WC Doubles	men	women	quad
Legends	men	women	mixed
- Australian Open

Sara Errani and Roberta Vinci were the defending champions and retained their title, defeating Ekaterina Makarova and Elena Vesnina in the final, 6–4, 3–6, 7–5.

== Seeds ==
1. (Italy) Sara Errani / (Italy) Roberta Vinci (champions)
2. (Chinese Taipei) Hsieh Su-wei / (China) Peng Shuai (second round)
3. (Russia) Ekaterina Makarova / (Russia) Elena Vesnina (final)
4. (Czech Republic) Květa Peschke / (Slovenia) Katarina Srebotnik (semifinals)
5. (Australia) Ashleigh Barty / (Australia) Casey Dellacqua (second round)
6. (Zimbabwe) Cara Black / (India) Sania Mirza (quarterfinals)
7. (Czech Republic) Andrea Hlaváčková / (Czech Republic) Lucie Šafářová (quarterfinals)
8. (United States) Raquel Kops-Jones / (United States) Abigail Spears (semifinals)
9. (Russia) Alla Kudryavtseva / (Australia) Anastasia Rodionova (first round)
10. (New Zealand) Marina Erakovic / (China) Zheng Jie (first round)
11. (Germany) Anna-Lena Grönefeld / (Croatia) Mirjana Lučić-Baroni (second round)
12. (France) Kristina Mladenovic / (Italy) Flavia Pennetta (second round)
13. (Chinese Taipei) Chan Hao-ching / (United States) Liezel Huber (third round)
14. (Germany) Julia Görges / (Czech Republic) Barbora Záhlavová-Strýcová (second round)
15. (Slovakia) Daniela Hantuchová / (United States) Lisa Raymond (third round)
16. (United States) Vania King / (Kazakhstan) Galina Voskoboeva (second round)

== Draw ==
Key

- Q = Qualifier
- WC = Wild card
- LL = Lucky loser
- Alt = Alternate
- ITF = ITF entry
- PR = Protected ranking
- SR = Special ranking
- SE = Special exempt
- JE = Junior exempt
- JR = Junior Accelerator Programme entrant
- CO = College Accelerator Programme entrant
- NG = Next Gen Accelerator Program entrant
- w/o = Walkover
- r = Retired
- d = Defaulted

=== Finals ===
Quarterfinals
1	(Italy) Sara Errani (Italy) Roberta Vinci	6	3	6
6	(Zimbabwe) Cara Black (India) Sania Mirza	2	6	4
4	(Czech Republic) Květa Peschke (Slovenia) Katarina Srebotnik	7	4	6
PR	(Australia) Jarmila Gajdošová (Croatia) Ajla Tomljanović	5	6	4
7	(Czech Republic) Andrea Hlaváčková (Czech Republic) Lucie Šafářová	2	6	6^{4}
3	(Russia) Ekaterina Makarova (Russia) Elena Vesnina	6	2	7^{7}
8	(United States) Raquel Kops-Jones (United States) Abigail Spears	6	6
(Israel) Shahar Pe'er (Spain) Sílvia Soler Espinosa	4	0

Semifinals
1	(Italy) Sara Errani (Italy) Roberta Vinci	6	6
4	(Czech Republic) Květa Peschke (Slovenia) Katarina Srebotnik	1	4
3	(Russia) Ekaterina Makarova (Russia) Elena Vesnina	7	3	6
8	(United States) Raquel Kops-Jones (United States) Abigail Spears	5	6	3

Final
1	(Italy) Sara Errani (Italy) Roberta Vinci	6	3	7
3	(Russia) Ekaterina Makarova (Russia) Elena Vesnina	4	6	5

=== Top half ===
==== Section 1 ====
First round
1	(Italy) S Errani (Italy) R Vinci	7	6
(Germany) M Barthel (United States) M Moulton-Levy	5	2
WC	(Australia) S Peers (Australia) V Rajicic	3	1
(Estonia) K Kanepi (Czech Republic) R Voráčová	6	6
WC	(Australia) M Adamczak (Australia) O Rogowska	6	7^{7}
(Croatia) D Jurak (Slovenia) A Klepač	3	6^{2}
WC	(Australia) N Bains (Australia) O Tjandramulia	3	3
14	(Germany) J Görges (Czech Republic) B Záhlavová-Strýcová	6	6
11	(Germany) A-L Grönefeld (Croatia) M Lučić-Baroni	6	6
WC	(Australia) A Hadzic (Australia) J Moore	3	1
(Canada) E Bouchard (Russia) V Dushevina	6	6
(Russia) V Solovyeva (Ukraine) E Svitolina	3	1
(Romania) M Niculescu (Czech Republic) K Zakopalová	6	6
(Romania) I-C Begu (Romania) S Cîrstea	3	2
WC	(Australia) T Patterson (Australia) Ar Rodionova	1	4
6	(Zimbabwe) C Black (India) S Mirza	6	6

Second round
1	(Italy) S Errani (Italy) R Vinci	1	6	6
(Estonia) K Kanepi (Czech Republic) R Voráčová	6	1	1
WC	(Australia) M Adamczak (Australia) O Rogowska	6	6
14	(Germany) J Görges (Czech Republic) B Záhlavová-Strýcová	2	3
11	(Germany) A-L Grönefeld (Croatia) M Lučić-Baroni	4	5
(Canada) E Bouchard (Russia) V Dushevina	6	7
(Romania) M Niculescu (Czech Republic) K Zakopalová	5	1
6	(Zimbabwe) C Black (India) S Mirza	7	6

Third round
1	(Italy) S Errani (Italy) R Vinci	6	6
WC	(Australia) M Adamczak (Australia) O Rogowska	2	2
(Canada) E Bouchard (Russia) V Dushevina	4	3
6	(Zimbabwe) C Black (India) S Mirza	6	6

Quarterfinals
1	(Italy) S Errani (Italy) R Vinci	6	3	6
6	(Zimbabwe) C Black (India) S Mirza	2	6	4

==== Section 2 ====
First round
4	(Czech Republic) K Peschke (Slovenia) K Srebotnik	2	6	6
(Romania) A Cadanțu (Romania) S Halep	6	3	2
(Belarus) O Govortsova (United States) C McHale	3	3
(Poland) K Piter (Poland) A Rosolska	6	6
(Japan) S Aoyama (Japan) M Doi	2	4
(United States) V Lepchenko (Romania) R Olaru	6	6
(Thailand) T Tanasugarn (China) S Zheng	3	3
13	(Chinese Taipei) H-c Chan (United States) L Huber	6	6
9	(Russia) A Kudryavtseva (Australia) An Rodionova	6	4	5
PR	(Australia) J Gajdošová (Croatia) A Tomljanović	1	6	7
Alt	(Ukraine) O Savchuk (Ukraine) L Tsurenko	4	2
(Germany) A Beck (Germany) A Petkovic	6	6
(Slovakia) D Cibulková (Belgium) Y Wickmayer	4	6	5
(Hungary) T Babos (Croatia) P Martić	6	3	7
(Russia) A Panova (Czech Republic) Ka Plíšková	1	1
5	(Australia) A Barty (Australia) C Dellacqua	6	6

Second round
4	(Czech Republic) K Peschke (Slovenia) K Srebotnik	7^{7}	6
(Poland) K Piter (Poland) A Rosolska	6^{2}	4
(United States) V Lepchenko (Romania) R Olaru	4	6^{4}
13	(Chinese Taipei) H-c Chan (United States) L Huber	6	7^{7}
PR	(Australia) J Gajdošová (Croatia) A Tomljanović	6	6
(Germany) A Beck (Germany) A Petkovic	4	2
(Hungary) T Babos (Croatia) P Martić	6	6
5	(Australia) A Barty (Australia) C Dellacqua	1	3

Third round
4	(Czech Republic) K Peschke (Slovenia) K Srebotnik	6	6^{6}	6
13	(Chinese Taipei) H-c Chan (United States) L Huber	2	7^{8}	4
PR	(Australia) J Gajdošová (Croatia) A Tomljanović	6	7
(Hungary) T Babos (Croatia) P Martić	2	5

Quarterfinals
4	(Czech Republic) K Peschke (Slovenia) K Srebotnik	7	4	6
PR	(Australia) J Gajdošová (Croatia) A Tomljanović	5	6	4

=== Bottom half ===
==== Section 3 ====
First round
7	(Czech Republic) A Hlaváčková (Czech Republic) L Šafářová	6	6
(Japan) K Date-Krumm (China) S Zhang	4	4
(Serbia) B Jovanovski (Croatia) D Vekić	0	1
(Spain) A Medina Garrigues (Kazakhstan) Y Shvedova	6	6
WC	(China) X Han (Japan) M Miyamura	2	5
(United States) M Keys (United States) A Riske	6	7
Alt	(Bulgaria) A Naydenova (Brazil) T Pereira	1	2
12	(France) K Mladenovic (Italy) F Pennetta	6	6
15	(Slovakia) D Hantuchová (United States) L Raymond	6^{2}	6	6
(Luxembourg) M Minella (South Africa) C Scheepers	7^{7}	2	1
WC	(Australia) J Dokić (Australia) S Sanders	4	4
(Slovakia) M Rybáriková (Switzerland) S Vögele	6	6
(Serbia) J Janković (Italy) K Knapp	6	6
PR	(Russia) A Pavlyuchenkova (Russia) V Zvonareva	2	4
(United States) L Davis (Spain) L Domínguez Lino	3	2
3	(Russia) E Makarova (Russia) E Vesnina	6	6

Second round
7	(Czech Republic) A Hlaváčková (Czech Republic) L Šafářová	6	6
(Spain) A Medina Garrigues (Kazakhstan) Y Shvedova	2	2
(United States) M Keys (United States) A Riske	7	6
12	(France) K Mladenovic (Italy) F Pennetta	5	4
15	(Slovakia) D Hantuchová (United States) L Raymond	6	6
(Slovakia) M Rybáriková (Switzerland) S Vögele	2	3
(Serbia) J Janković (Italy) K Knapp	4	3
3	(Russia) E Makarova (Russia) E Vesnina	6	6

Third round
7	(Czech Republic) A Hlaváčková (Czech Republic) L Šafářová	6	6
(United States) M Keys (United States) A Riske	4	3
15	(Slovakia) D Hantuchová (United States) L Raymond	4	7^{7}	2
3	(Russia) E Makarova (Russia) E Vesnina	6	6^{5}	6

Quarterfinals
7	(Czech Republic) A Hlaváčková (Czech Republic) L Šafářová	2	6	6^{4}
3	(Russia) E Makarova (Russia) E Vesnina	6	2	7^{7}

==== Section 4 ====
First round
8	(United States) R Kops-Jones (United States) A Spears	6	6
PR	(Chinese Taipei) C-j Chuang (Latvia) L Dekmeijere	1	1
(Spain) G Muguruza (Spain) A Parra Santonja	4	6	7
(Canada) S Fichman (Puerto Rico) M Puig	6	4	5
(Russia) S Kuznetsova (Australia) S Stosur	6	6
(Ukraine) I Buryachok (Georgia (country)) O Kalashnikova	1	2
(France) A Cornet (France) C Garcia	6	6
10	(New Zealand) M Erakovic (China) J Zheng	3	3
16	(United States) V King (Kazakhstan) G Voskoboeva	6	6
(Austria) S Klemenschits (Austria) Y Meusburger	2	3
(Netherlands) K Bertens (Belgium) K Flipkens	6	3	4
(Czech Republic) L Hradecká (Netherlands) M Krajicek	3	6	6
(Chinese Taipei) Y-j Chan (Slovakia) J Husárová	5	6	4
(Israel) S Pe'er (Spain) S Soler Espinosa	7	4	6
(Czech Republic) E Hrdinová (Argentina) P Ormaechea	7^{8}	6^{1}	0
2	(Chinese Taipei) S-w Hsieh (China) S Peng	6^{6}	7^{7}	6

Second round
8	(United States) R Kops-Jones (United States) A Spears	6	7^{7}
(Spain) G Muguruza (Spain) A Parra Santonja	4	6^{4}
(Russia) S Kuznetsova (Australia) S Stosur	3	6^{4}
(France) A Cornet (France) C Garcia	6	7^{7}
16	(United States) V King (Kazakhstan) G Voskoboeva	6^{4}	1
(Czech Republic) L Hradecká (Netherlands) M Krajicek	7^{7}	6
(Israel) S Pe'er (Spain) S Soler Espinosa	7	3	6
2	(Chinese Taipei) S-w Hsieh (China) S Peng	5	6	4

Third round
8	(United States) R Kops-Jones (United States) A Spears	4	6	6
(France) A Cornet (France) C Garcia	6	4	4
(Czech Republic) L Hradecká (Netherlands) M Krajicek	6	6^{5}	2
(Israel) S Pe'er (Spain) S Soler Espinosa	4	7^{7}	6

Quarterfinals
8	(United States) R Kops-Jones (United States) A Spears	6	6
(Israel) S Pe'er (Spain) S Soler Espinosa	4	0
