= 2013 Moorilla Hobart International – Singles =

Singles
- 2013 Moorilla Hobart International

Final
- Champion: (Russia) Elena Vesnina
- Runner-up: (Germany) Mona Barthel
- Score: 6–3, 6–4

Details
- Draw: 32
- Seeds: 8

Events
Singles	Doubles
← 2012 ·	Moorilla Hobart International	· 2014 →

Elena Vesnina won the title, defeating defending champion Mona Barthel in the final, 6–3, 6–4. It was her maiden WTA singles title, having lost six previous finals.

== Seeds ==
1. (Chinese Taipei) Hsieh Su-wei (first round)
2. (Romania) Sorana Cîrstea (second round)
3. (Czech Republic) Klára Zakopalová (second round)
4. (Kazakhstan) Yaroslava Shvedova (second round)
5. (Spain) Carla Suárez Navarro (first round)
6. (Italy) Francesca Schiavone (first round)
7. (Russia) Anastasia Pavlyuchenkova (withdrew because of a left hip injury)
8. (United States) Sloane Stephens (semifinals)
9. (Germany) Mona Barthel (final)

== Draw ==
=== Key ===
- Q = Qualifier
- WC = Wild card
- LL = Lucky loser
- Alt = Alternate
- ITF = ITF entry
- PR = Protected ranking
- SR = Special ranking
- SE = Special exempt
- JE = Junior exempt
- JR = Junior Accelerator Programme entrant
- CO = College Accelerator Programme entrant
- NG = Next Gen Accelerator Program entrant
- w/o = Walkover
- r = Retired
- d = Defaulted

=== Finals ===
Semifinals
(Belgium) Kirsten Flipkens	4	4
9	(Germany) Mona Barthel	6	6
(Russia) Elena Vesnina	6	6
8	(United States) Sloane Stephens	2	2

Final
9	(Germany) Mona Barthel	3	4
(Russia) Elena Vesnina	6	6

=== Top half ===
First round
1	(Chinese Taipei) S-w Hsieh	2	7^{7}	6^{4}
(China) S Peng	6	6^{4}	7^{7}
(Romania) M Niculescu	6	6
Q	(Luxembourg) M Minella	4	3
(Serbia) B Jovanovski	6	7^{9}
LL	(Spain) MT Torró Flor	0	6^{7}
(Belgium) K Flipkens	2	6	7^{7}
6	(Italy) F Schiavone	6	3	6^{4}
3	(Czech Republic) K Zakopalová	6	6
(Hungary) T Babos	4	3
(Bulgaria) T Pironkova	6	6
(Romania) I-C Begu	3	4
(South Africa) C Scheepers	6	6
(France) A Cornet	1	2
WC	(Australia) A Barty	6	0	1
9	(Germany) M Barthel	2	6	6

Second round
(China) S Peng	6	4	4
(Romania) M Niculescu	3	6	6
(Serbia) B Jovanovski	3	2
(Belgium) K Flipkens	6	6
3	(Czech Republic) K Zakopalová	6	4	2
(Bulgaria) T Pironkova	3	6	6
(South Africa) C Scheepers	6^{3}	5
9	(Germany) M Barthel	7^{7}	7

Quarterfinals
(Romania) M Niculescu	6	4	0
(Belgium) K Flipkens	2	6	6
(Bulgaria) T Pironkova	3	3
9	(Germany) M Barthel	6	6

Semifinals
(Belgium) K Flipkens	4	4
9	(Germany) M Barthel	6	6

=== Bottom half ===
First round
5	(Spain) C Suárez Navarro	2	1
(Belarus) O Govortsova	6	6
WC	(Australia) J Gajdošová	6	7
(Switzerland) R Oprandi	4	5
Q	(Spain) S Soler Espinosa	2	4
(Russia) E Vesnina	6	6
(Spain) L Domínguez Lino	4	1
4	(Kazakhstan) Y Shvedova	6	6
8	(United States) S Stephens	6	7^{7}
(United Kingdom) L Robson	4	6^{4}
Q	(Spain) L Arruabarrena Vecino	3	2
(Romania) S Halep	6	6
Q	(United States) L Davis	1	6	7^{7}
WC	(Australia) B Bobusic	6	2	6^{5}
LL	(Russia) N Bratchikova	6	5	2
2	(Romania) S Cîrstea	3	7	6

Second round
(Belarus) O Govortsova	3	1
WC	(Australia) J Gajdošová	6	6
(Russia) E Vesnina	4	6	6
4	(Kazakhstan) Y Shvedova	6	2	1
8	(United States) S Stephens	6	6
(Romania) S Halep	4	0
Q	(United States) L Davis	6	6
2	(Romania) S Cîrstea	1	3

Quarterfinals
WC	(Australia) J Gajdošová	3	2
(Russia) E Vesnina	6	6
8	(United States) S Stephens	6	4	7
Q	(United States) L Davis	3	6	5

Semifinals
(Russia) E Vesnina	6	6
8	(United States) S Stephens	2	2

== Qualifying ==
=== Seeds ===
1. (Luxembourg) Mandy Minella (qualified)
2. (Spain) Lara Arruabarrena Vecino (qualified)
3. (Russia) Nina Bratchikova (qualifying competition, lucky loser)
4. (Spain) Sílvia Soler Espinosa (qualified)
5. (United States) Lauren Davis (qualified)
6. (Spain) María Teresa Torró Flor (qualifying competition, lucky loser)
7. (Spain) Garbiñe Muguruza (qualifying competition)
8. (Kazakhstan) Yulia Putintseva (qualifying competition)

=== Qualifiers ===
1. (Luxembourg) Mandy Minella
2. (Spain) Lara Arruabarrena Vecino
3. (United States) Lauren Davis
4. (Spain) Sílvia Soler Espinosa

=== Lucky losers ===
1. (Russia) Nina Bratchikova
2. (Spain) María Teresa Torró Flor

=== Draw ===
==== First qualifier ====
First round
1	(Luxembourg) Mandy Minella	7^{12}	6
(Canada) Rebecca Marino	6^{10}	4
(United States) Chiara Scholl	6	2	1
WC	(China) Zhang Yuxuan	3	6	6
(Australia) Tammi Patterson	6	6
WC	(Slovakia) Janette Husárová	2	2
(Slovenia) Andreja Klepač	4	3
7	(Spain) Garbiñe Muguruza	6	6

Second round
1	(Luxembourg) Mandy Minella	6	6
WC	(China) Zhang Yuxuan	2	3
(Australia) Tammi Patterson	3	1
7	(Spain) Garbiñe Muguruza	6	6

Qualifying competition
1	(Luxembourg) Mandy Minella	0	6	6
7	(Spain) Garbiñe Muguruza	6	2	4

==== Second qualifier ====
First round
2	(Spain) Lara Arruabarrena Vecino	6	6
WC	(Australia) Sally Peers	3	2
(Russia) Daria Gavrilova	3	4
(Colombia) Mariana Duque	6	6
WC	(Australia) Viktorija Rajicic	2	6	6
(Canada) Stéphanie Dubois	6	4	1
(China) Zhou Yimiao
8	(Kazakhstan) Yulia Putintseva	w/o

Second round
2	(Spain) Lara Arruabarrena Vecino	6	7
(Colombia) Mariana Duque	2	5
(Australia) Viktorija Rajicic	4	5
8	(Kazakhstan) Yulia Putintseva	6	7

Qualifying competition
2	(Spain) Lara Arruabarrena Vecino	6	2	7^{10}
8	(Kazakhstan) Yulia Putintseva	4	6	6^{8}

==== Third qualifier ====
First round
3	(Russia) Nina Bratchikova	6	5	6
(Russia) Valeria Savinykh	4	7	4
WC	(Australia) Stephanie Bengson	2	4
(Australia) Sacha Jones	6	6
(Canada) Marie-Ève Pelletier
(Israel) Julia Glushko	w/o
(China) Hu Yueyue	4	1
5	(United States) Lauren Davis	6	6

Second round
3	(Russia) Nina Bratchikova	3	7	6
(Australia) Sacha Jones	6	5	2
(Israel) Julia Glushko	4	0
5	(United States) Lauren Davis	6	6

Qualifying competition
3	(Russia) Nina Bratchikova	6	4	1
5	(United States) Lauren Davis	3	6	6

==== Fourth qualifier ====
First round
4	(Spain) Sílvia Soler Espinosa	6	2	7
(Brazil) Teliana Pereira	2	6	5
(South Africa) Chanel Simmonds	7	6
(Australia) Karolina Wlodarczak	5	4
WC	(Australia) Jessica Moore	3	5
(China) Duan Yingying	6	7
(Italy) Maria Elena Camerin	2	6	1
6	(Spain) María Teresa Torró Flor	6	2	6

Second round
4	(Spain) Sílvia Soler Espinosa	7	7^{8}
(South Africa) Chanel Simmonds	5	6^{6}
(China) Duan Yingying	3	3
6	(Spain) María Teresa Torró Flor	6	6

Qualifying competition
4	(Spain) Sílvia Soler Espinosa	1	7^{7}	6
6	(Spain) María Teresa Torró Flor	6	6^{3}	1
