= 2013 Moorilla Hobart International – Doubles =

Doubles
- 2013 Moorilla Hobart International

Final
- Champions: (Spain) Garbiñe Muguruza (Spain) María Teresa Torró Flor
- Runners-up: (Hungary) Tímea Babos (Luxembourg) Mandy Minella
- Score: 6–3, 7–6^{(7–5)}

Events
Singles	Doubles
← 2012 ·	Moorilla Hobart International	· 2014 →

Irina-Camelia Begu and Monica Niculescu were the defending champions but Niculescu decided not to participate.
Begu teamed up alongside Simona Halep, but they lost in the quarterfinals to Tímea Babos and Mandy Minella.
Garbiñe Muguruza and María Teresa Torró Flor won the title, defeating Babos and Minella in the final 6–3, 7–6^{(7–5)}.

== Seeds ==
1. (Spain) Anabel Medina Garrigues / (Kazakhstan) Yaroslava Shvedova (quarterfinals, withdrew)
2. (Australia) Jarmila Gajdošová / (Czech Republic) Klára Zakopalová (quarterfinals, withdrew)
3. (Russia) Nina Bratchikova / (Slovakia) Janette Husárová (quarterfinals)
4. (Latvia) Līga Dekmeijere / (United States) Megan Moulton-Levy (first round)

== Draw ==
=== Key ===
- Q = Qualifier
- WC = Wild card
- LL = Lucky loser
- Alt = Alternate
- SE = Special exempt
- PR = Protected ranking
- ITF = ITF entry
- JE = Junior exempt
- w/o = Walkover
- r = Retired
- d = Defaulted
- SR = Special ranking

First round
(Australia) S Jones (Canada) R Marino	6	4	[5]
(Spain) L Arruabarrena Vecino (Spain) L Domínguez Lino	4	6	[10]
4	(Latvia) L Dekmeijere (United States) M Moulton-Levy	5	3
(Romania) I-C Begu (Romania) S Halep	7	6
(Spain) S Soler Espinosa (Spain) C Suárez Navarro	6	6^{7}	[8]
(Hungary) T Babos (Luxembourg) M Minella	3	7^{9}	[10]
(Australia) A Barty (Australia) B Bobusic	6	6
(Australia) S Bengson (Australia) J Moore	1	3
WC	(Australia) A Hibberd (Australia) J Smith	1	3
3	(Russia) N Bratchikova (Slovakia) J Husárová	6	6
(Spain) G Muguruza (Spain) MT Torró Flor	6	6
WC	(Australia) V Dobson (Australia) K Wlodarczak	1	1
(France) A Cornet (Slovenia) A Klepač	3	4
2	(Australia) J Gajdošová (Czech Republic) K Zakopalová	6	6

Quarterfinals
1	(Spain) A Medina Garrigues (Kazakhstan) Y Shvedova
(Spain) L Arruabarrena Vecino (Spain) L Domínguez Lino	w/o
(Romania) I-C Begu (Romania) S Halep	6^{1}	0
(Hungary) T Babos (Luxembourg) M Minella	7^{7}	6
(Australia) A Barty (Australia) B Bobusic	7	7
3	(Russia) N Bratchikova (Slovakia) J Husárová	5	5
(Spain) G Muguruza (Spain) MT Torró Flor	w/o
2	(Australia) J Gajdošová (Czech Republic) K Zakopalová

Semifinals
(Spain) L Arruabarrena Vecino (Spain) L Domínguez Lino	2	2
(Hungary) T Babos (Luxembourg) M Minella	6	6
(Australia) A Barty (Australia) B Bobusic	6	6^{7}	[2]
(Spain) G Muguruza (Spain) MT Torró Flor	2	7^{9}	[10]

Final
(Hungary) T Babos (Luxembourg) M Minella	3	6^{5}
(Spain) G Muguruza (Spain) MT Torró Flor	6	7^{7}
