= 2012 Moorilla Hobart International – Singles =

Singles
- 2012 Moorilla Hobart International

Final
- Champion: (Germany) Mona Barthel
- Runner-up: (Belgium) Yanina Wickmayer
- Score: 6–1, 6–2

Details
- Draw: 32
- Seeds: 8

Events
Singles	Doubles
← 2011 ·	Moorilla Hobart International	· 2013 →

Jarmila Gajdošová was the defending champion, but lost in the quarterfinals to Mona Barthel.

Barthel reached the final where she defeated Yanina Wickmayer 6–1, 6–2 to win her first WTA Tour title. With this win, Barthel became the first qualifier to win a WTA tournament since Tamira Paszek won Quebec City in September 2010.

This tournament also marked the first WTA main draw appearance of future French Open champion and world No. 1 Ashleigh Barty, who was awarded a wild card and defeated in the first round by Bethanie Mattek-Sands.

== Seeds ==
1. (Belgium) Yanina Wickmayer (final)
2. (Spain) Anabel Medina Garrigues (second round)
3. (Romania) Monica Niculescu (first round)
4. (Germany) Angelique Kerber (semifinals)
5. (Australia) Jarmila Gajdošová (quarterfinals)
6. (Israel) Shahar Pe'er (semifinals)
7. (Kazakhstan) Ksenia Pervak (first round)
8. (Romania) Irina-Camelia Begu (second round)

== Draw ==
=== Key ===
- Q = Qualifier
- WC = Wild card
- LL = Lucky loser
- Alt = Alternate
- ITF = ITF entry
- PR = Protected ranking
- SR = Special ranking
- SE = Special exempt
- JE = Junior exempt
- JR = Junior Accelerator Programme entrant
- CO = College Accelerator Programme entrant
- NG = Next Gen Accelerator Program entrant
- w/o = Walkover
- r = Retired
- d = Defaulted

=== Finals ===
Semifinals
1	(Belgium) Yanina Wickmayer	7^{7}	6
6	(Israel) Shahar Pe'er	6^{1}	3
4	(Germany) Angelique Kerber	0	6^{6}
Q	(Germany) Mona Barthel	6	7^{8}

Final
1	(Belgium) Yanina Wickmayer	1	2
Q	(Germany) Mona Barthel	6	6

=== Top half ===
First round
1	(Belgium) Y Wickmayer	7	6
(New Zealand) M Erakovic	5	4
(Kazakhstan) G Voskoboeva	5	6	4
WC	(Australia) C Dellacqua	7	4	6
(Czech Republic) K Zakopalová	6	2	5
(Romania) S Halep	4	6	7
(United Kingdom) E Baltacha	2	5
8	(Romania) I-C Begu	6	7
3	(Romania) M Niculescu	0	4
PR	(Russia) A Chakvetadze	6	6
(Bulgaria) T Pironkova	7^{12}	3	7^{7}
Q	(United Kingdom) H Watson	6^{10}	6	6^{2}
LL	(Germany) K Barrois	1	4
Q	(Australia) S Jones	6	6
(Czech Republic) L Hradecká	3	1
6	(Israel) S Pe'er	6	6

Second round
1	(Belgium) Y Wickmayer	6	6
WC	(Australia) C Dellacqua	1	1
(Romania) S Halep	6	6
8	(Romania) I-C Begu	4	2
PR	(Russia) A Chakvetadze	6	6
(Bulgaria) T Pironkova	3	2
Q	(Australia) S Jones	6^{7}	4
6	(Israel) S Pe'er	7^{9}	6

Quarterfinals
1	(Belgium) Y Wickmayer	6	6
(Romania) S Halep	4	0
PR	(Russia) A Chakvetadze	6	4	0^{r}
6	(Israel) S Pe'er	4	6	1

Semifinal
1	(Belgium) Y Wickmayer	7^{7}	6
6	(Israel) S Pe'er	6^{1}	3

=== Bottom half ===
First round
7	(Kazakhstan) K Pervak	2	6^{6}
(Romania) S Cîrstea	6	7^{8}
WC	(Australia) A Barty	2	2
(United States) B Mattek-Sands	6	6
(Sweden) J Larsson	3	3
(Italy) S Errani	6	6
(Russia) E Vesnina	2	4
4	(Germany) A Kerber	6	6
5	(Australia) J Gajdošová	6	6
(Japan) A Morita	3	4
(Hungary) G Arn	4	5
WC	(Australia) A Rodionova	6	7
Q	(Germany) M Barthel	6	6
Q	(Italy) R Oprandi	1	4
(Spain) C Suárez Navarro	2	6^{3}
2	(Spain) A Medina Garrigues	6	7^{7}

Second round
(Romania) S Cîrstea	2	6	7
(United States) B Mattek-Sands	6	3	5
(Italy) S Errani	1	2
4	(Germany) A Kerber	6	6
5	(Australia) J Gajdošová	6	1	6
WC	(Australia) A Rodionova	3	6	4
Q	(Germany) M Barthel	6	6
2	(Spain) A Medina Garrigues	1	4

Quarterfinals
(Romania) S Cîrstea	0	6	5
4	(Germany) A Kerber	6	3	7
5	(Australia) J Gajdošová	6	3	2
Q	(Germany) M Barthel	2	6	6

Semifinal
4	(Germany) A Kerber	0	6^{6}
Q	(Germany) M Barthel	6	7^{8}

== Qualifying ==
=== Seeds ===
1. (Canada) Rebecca Marino (second round)
2. (Germany) Mona Barthel (qualified)
3. (Italy) Alberta Brianti (first round)
4. (Slovakia) Magdaléna Rybáriková (second round)
5. (France) Mathilde Johansson (first round)
6. (Italy) Romina Oprandi (qualified)
7. (United States) Irina Falconi (second round)
8. (Germany) Kristina Barrois (qualifying competition, lucky loser)

=== Qualifiers ===
1. (Italy) Romina Oprandi
2. (Germany) Mona Barthel
3. (United Kingdom) Heather Watson
4. (Australia) Sacha Jones

=== Lucky loser ===
1. (Germany) Kristina Barrois

=== Qualifying draw ===
==== First qualifier ====
First round
1	(Canada) Rebecca Marino	6	6
(United States) Chichi Scholl	4	3
(Canada) Aleksandra Wozniak	6	2	7^{7}
(Ukraine) Mariya Koryttseva	4	6	6^{4}
(United States) Sloane Stephens	4	6	2
(United States) CoCo Vandeweghe	6	3	6
(Ukraine) Lesia Tsurenko	3	6^{2}
6	(Italy) Romina Oprandi	6	7^{7}

Second round
1	(Canada) Rebecca Marino	7	4	6^{9}
(Canada) Aleksandra Wozniak	5	6	7^{11}
(United States) CoCo Vandeweghe	6^{3}	1
6	(Italy) Romina Oprandi	7^{7}	6

Qualifying competition
(Canada) Aleksandra Wozniak	2	3
6	(Italy) Romina Oprandi	6	6

==== Second qualifier ====
First round
2	(Germany) Mona Barthel	6	6
(Russia) Valeria Savinykh	4	3
(Russia) Evgeniya Rodina	6^{8}	2
(Belarus) Olga Govortsova	7^{10}	6
WC	(Australia) Storm Sanders	2	4
(Spain) Estrella Cabeza Candela	6	6
(Russia) Nina Bratchikova	6	6
5	(France) Mathilde Johansson	4	2

Second round
2	(Germany) Mona Barthel	6	6
(Belarus) Olga Govortsova	2	3
(Spain) Estrella Cabeza Candela	3	6^{4}
(Russia) Nina Bratchikova	6	7^{7}

Qualifying competition
2	(Germany) Mona Barthel	4	6	6
(Russia) Nina Bratchikova	6	2	1

==== Third qualifier ====
First round
3	(Italy) Alberta Brianti	1	1
(Australia) Olivia Rogowska	6	6
WC	(Australia) Bojana Bobusic	6	3	5
(United Kingdom) Heather Watson	3	6	7
(Czech Republic) Eva Birnerová	7^{7}	2	2
(Poland) Marta Domachowska	6^{2}	6	6
WC	(Australia) Belinda Woolcock	0	3
8	(Germany) Kristina Barrois	6	6

Second round
(Australia) Olivia Rogowska	3	2
(United Kingdom) Heather Watson	6	6
(Poland) Marta Domachowska	1	2
8	(Germany) Kristina Barrois	6	6

Qualifying competition
(United Kingdom) Heather Watson	4	7	7^{7}
8	(Germany) Kristina Barrois	6	5	6^{1}

==== Fourth qualifier ====
First round
4	(Slovakia) Magdaléna Rybáriková	4	6	7^{7}
(Canada) Stéphanie Dubois	6	3	6^{5}
(Romania) Alexandra Cadanțu	4	2
WC	(Australia) Sacha Jones	6	6
(United States) Alison Riske	7^{7}	6
(Hungary) Réka-Luca Jani	6^{2}	3
(Italy) Karin Knapp	6	3	2
7	(United States) Irina Falconi	4	6	6

Second round
4	(Slovakia) Magdaléna Rybáriková	3	2
WC	(Australia) Sacha Jones	6	6
(United States) Alison Riske	6	3	7
7	(United States) Irina Falconi	0	6	5

Qualifying competition
WC	(Australia) Sacha Jones	6	6
(United States) Alison Riske	2	3
