= 2012 Moorilla Hobart International – Doubles =

Doubles
- 2012 Moorilla Hobart International

Final
- Champions: (Romania) Irina-Camelia Begu (Romania) Monica Niculescu
- Runners-up: (Chinese Taipei) Chuang Chia-jung (New Zealand) Marina Erakovic
- Score: 6–7^{(4–7)}, 7–6^{(7–4)}, [10–5]

Events
Singles	Doubles
← 2011 ·	Moorilla Hobart International	· 2013 →

Sara Errani and Roberta Vinci were the defending champions but decided not to participate.

Irina-Camelia Begu and Monica Niculescu won in the final, defeating Chuang Chia-jung and Marina Erakovic, 6–7^{(4–7)}, 7–6^{(7–4)}, [10–5].

== Seeds ==
The top seeds received a bye into the quarterfinals.

1. (Czech Republic) Lucie Hradecká / (Spain) Anabel Medina Garrigues (quarterfinals)
2. (Australia) Jarmila Gajdošová / (United States) Bethanie Mattek-Sands (semifinals, retired)
3. (Chinese Taipei) Chuang Chia-jung / (New Zealand) Marina Erakovic (final)
4. (Romania) Irina-Camelia Begu / (Romania) Monica Niculescu (champions)

== Draw ==
=== Key ===
- Q = Qualifier
- WC = Wild card
- LL = Lucky loser
- Alt = Alternate
- SE = Special exempt
- PR = Protected ranking
- ITF = ITF entry
- JE = Junior exempt
- w/o = Walkover
- r = Retired
- d = Defaulted
- SR = Special ranking

=== Draw ===
First round
(Ukraine) K Bondarenko (Australia) A Rodionova	6	0	[10]
(Japan) S Aoyama (United States) I Falconi	2	6	[6]
3	(Chinese Taipei) C-j Chuang (New Zealand) M Erakovic	7	6
(Poland) K Jans-Ignacik (Bosnia and Herzegovina) M Jugić-Salkić	5	4
(Latvia) L Dekmeijere (United States) M Moulton-Levy	3	7^{7}	[7]
(Romania) S Halep (Slovakia) J Husárová	6	6^{5}	[10]
(Romania) S Cîrstea (Croatia) D Jurak	6	7^{7}
(Germany) K Barrois (Germany) J Wöhr	3	6^{5}
(Slovakia) M Rybáriková (Czech Republic) K Zakopalová	1	2
4	(Romania) I-C Begu (Romania) M Niculescu	6	6
(Kazakhstan) X Pervak (United States) S Stephens	4	6	[11]
(Czech Republic) E Birnerová (Italy) A Brianti	6	1	[9]
(Australia) D Jeflea (Australia) T Patterson	3	3
2	(Australia) J Gajdošová (United States) B Mattek-Sands	6	6

Quarterfinals
1	(Czech Republic) L Hradecká (Spain) A Medina Garrigues	6^{3}	6	[6]
(Ukraine) K Bondarenko (Australia) A Rodionova	7^{7}	3	[10]
3	(Chinese Taipei) C-j Chuang (New Zealand) M Erakovic	6	6
(Romania) S Halep (Slovakia) J Husárová	3	4
(Romania) S Cîrstea (Croatia) D Jurak	3	5
4	(Romania) I-C Begu (Romania) M Niculescu	6	7
(Kazakhstan) X Pervak (United States) S Stephens	3	1
2	(Australia) J Gajdošová (United States) B Mattek-Sands	6	6

Semifinals
(Ukraine) K Bondarenko (Australia) A Rodionova	6	1	[4]
3	(Chinese Taipei) C-j Chuang (New Zealand) M Erakovic	3	6	[10]
4	(Romania) I-C Begu (Romania) M Niculescu	3
2	(Australia) J Gajdošová (United States) B Mattek-Sands	1^{r}

Final
3	(Chinese Taipei) C-j Chuang (New Zealand) M Erakovic	7^{7}	6^{4}	[5]
4	(Romania) I-C Begu (Romania) M Niculescu	6^{4}	7^{7}	[10]
