= 2013 Australian Open – Women's singles =

Women's singles
- 2013 Australian Open

Final
- Champion: (Belarus) Victoria Azarenka
- Runner-up: (China) Li Na
- Score: 4–6, 6–4, 6–3

Details
- Draw: 128 (12Q / 8WC)
- Seeds: 32

Events
Singles	men	women		boys	girls
Doubles	men	women	mixed	boys	girls
WC Singles	men	women	quad
WC Doubles	men	women	quad
Legends	men	women	mixed
- Australian Open

Defending champion Victoria Azarenka defeated Li Na in the final, 4–6, 6–4, 6–3 to win the women's singles tennis title at the 2013 Australian Open. It was her second Australian Open title and second major title overall.

Azarenka, Maria Sharapova and Serena Williams were in contention for the world No. 1 singles ranking. Azarenka retained the top ranking by winning the title after Sharapova and Williams lost in the semifinals and quarterfinals, respectively.

== Seeds ==
1. (Belarus) Victoria Azarenka (champion)
2. (Russia) Maria Sharapova (semifinals)
3. (United States) Serena Williams (quarterfinals)
4. (Poland) Agnieszka Radwańska (quarterfinals)
5. (Germany) Angelique Kerber (fourth round)
6. (China) Li Na (final)
7. (Italy) Sara Errani (first round)
8. (Czech Republic) Petra Kvitová (second round)
9. (Australia) Samantha Stosur (second round)
10. (Denmark) Caroline Wozniacki (fourth round)
11. (France) Marion Bartoli (third round)
12. (Russia) Nadia Petrova (first round)
13. (Serbia) Ana Ivanovic (fourth round)
14. (Russia) Maria Kirilenko (fourth round)
15. (Slovakia) Dominika Cibulková (second round)
16. (Italy) Roberta Vinci (third round)

17. (Czech Republic) Lucie Šafářová (second round)
18. (Germany) Julia Görges (fourth round)
19. (Russia) Ekaterina Makarova (quarterfinals)
20. (Belgium) Yanina Wickmayer (third round)
21. (United States) Varvara Lepchenko (second round)
22. (Serbia) Jelena Janković (third round)
23. (Czech Republic) Klára Zakopalová (second round)
24. (Russia) Anastasia Pavlyuchenkova (first round)
25. (United States) Venus Williams (third round)
26. (Chinese Taipei) Hsieh Su-wei (second round)
27. (Romania) Sorana Cîrstea (third round)
28. (Kazakhstan) Yaroslava Shvedova (first round)
29. (United States) Sloane Stephens (semifinals)
30. (Austria) Tamira Paszek (second round)
31. (Poland) Urszula Radwańska (first round)
32. (Germany) Mona Barthel (first round)

Click on the seed number of a player to go to their draw section.

== Draw ==
Key

- Q = Qualifier
- WC = Wild card
- LL = Lucky loser
- Alt = Alternate
- ITF = ITF entry
- PR = Protected ranking
- SR = Special ranking
- SE = Special exempt
- JE = Junior exempt
- JR = Junior Accelerator Programme entrant
- CO = College Accelerator Programme entrant
- NG = Next Gen Accelerator Program entrant
- w/o = Walkover
- r = Retired
- d = Defaulted

=== Finals ===
Quarterfinals
1	(Belarus) Victoria Azarenka	7	6
(Russia) Svetlana Kuznetsova	5	1
3	(United States) Serena Williams	6	5	4
29	(United States) Sloane Stephens	3	7	6
6	(China) Li Na	7	6
4	(Poland) Agnieszka Radwańska	5	3
19	(Russia) Ekaterina Makarova	2	2
2	(Russia) Maria Sharapova	6	6

Semifinals
1	(Belarus) Victoria Azarenka	6	6
29	(United States) Sloane Stephens	1	4
6	(China) Li Na	6	6
2	(Russia) Maria Sharapova	2	2

Final
1	(Belarus) Victoria Azarenka	4	6	6
6	(China) Li Na	6	4	3

=== Top half ===
==== Section 1 ====
First round
1	(Belarus) V Azarenka	6	6
(Romania) M Niculescu	1	4
(Greece) E Daniilidou	7	5	6
(Czech Republic) Ka Plíšková	5	7	4
Q	(Thailand) L Kumkhum	7^{7}	6
(Sweden) S Arvidsson	6^{5}	4
(United States) J Hampton	6	6
31	(Poland) U Radwańska	2	4
21	(United States) V Lepchenko	6	6
(Slovenia) P Hercog	4	1
WC	(France) C Garcia	6	3	1
(Russia) E Vesnina	3	6	6
(France) M Johansson	4	2
Q	(Uzbekistan) A Amanmuradova	6	6
(Spain) S Soler Espinosa	3	5
16	(Italy) R Vinci	6	7

Second round
1	(Belarus) V Azarenka	6	6
(Greece) E Daniilidou	1	0
Q	(Thailand) L Kumkhum	1	2
(United States) J Hampton	6	6
21	(United States) V Lepchenko	4	2
(Russia) E Vesnina	6	6
Q	(Uzbekistan) A Amanmuradova	3	2
16	(Italy) R Vinci	6	6

Third round
1	(Belarus) V Azarenka	6	4	6
(United States) J Hampton	4	6	2
(Russia) E Vesnina	4	7^{7}	6
16	(Italy) R Vinci	6	6^{4}	4

Fourth round
1	(Belarus) V Azarenka	6	6
(Russia) E Vesnina	1	1

==== Section 2 ====
First round
10	(Denmark) C Wozniacki	2	6	6
(Germany) S Lisicki	6	3	3
(Czech Republic) A Hlaváčková	1	2
(Croatia) D Vekić	6	6
Q	(Russia) D Gavrilova	6	6^{2}	6
(United States) L Davis	3	7^{7}	4
Q	(Ukraine) L Tsurenko	7	3	7
24	(Russia) A Pavlyuchenkova	5	6	5
26	(Chinese Taipei) S-w Hsieh	7^{7}	6
(Spain) L Arruabarrena	6^{5}	2
(Russia) S Kuznetsova	6	6
(Spain) L Domínguez Lino	2	1
(Kazakhstan) Y Putintseva	6	6^{0}	6
(United States) C McHale	1	7^{7}	2
(Spain) C Suárez Navarro	6	6
7	(Italy) S Errani	4	4

Second round
10	(Denmark) C Wozniacki	6	6
(Croatia) D Vekić	1	4
Q	(Russia) D Gavrilova	5	3
Q	(Ukraine) L Tsurenko	7	6
26	(Chinese Taipei) S-w Hsieh	2	1
(Russia) S Kuznetsova	6	6
(Kazakhstan) Y Putintseva	6	6^{5}	2
(Spain) C Suárez Navarro	1	7^{7}	6

Third round
10	(Denmark) C Wozniacki	6	6
Q	(Ukraine) L Tsurenko	4	3
(Russia) S Kuznetsova	6	4	6
(Spain) C Suárez Navarro	2	6	3

Fourth round
10	(Denmark) C Wozniacki	2	6	5
(Russia) S Kuznetsova	6	2	7

==== Section 3 ====
First round
3	(United States) S Williams	6	6
(Romania) E Gallovits-Hall	0	0
(Slovakia) M Rybáriková	6	1	12
(Spain) G Muguruza	4	6	14
(Japan) A Morita	6	6
(Georgia (country)) A Tatishvili	3	3
(Germany) A Beck	6	6^{7}	6
28	(Kazakhstan) Y Shvedova	2	7^{9}	3
20	(Belgium) Y Wickmayer	6	7
WC	(Australia) J Gajdošová	1	5
Q	(Hungary) G Arn	2	2
(Slovakia) J Čepelová	6	6
PR	(Canada) R Marino	3	0
(China) S Peng	6	6
(United States) V King	4	2
14	(Russia) M Kirilenko	6	6

Second round
3	(United States) S Williams	6	6
(Spain) G Muguruza	2	0
(Japan) A Morita	6	6
(Germany) A Beck	2	0
20	(Belgium) Y Wickmayer	7^{10}	7
(Slovakia) J Čepelová	6^{8}	5
(China) S Peng	5	2
14	(Russia) M Kirilenko	7	6

Third round
3	(United States) S Williams	6	6
(Japan) A Morita	1	3
20	(Belgium) Y Wickmayer	6^{4}	3
14	(Russia) M Kirilenko	7^{7}	6

Fourth round
3	(United States) S Williams	6	6
14	(Russia) M Kirilenko	2	0

==== Section 4 ====
First round
12	(Russia) N Petrova	2	0
(Japan) K Date-Krumm	6	6
(Israel) S Pe'er	6	1	6
(Russia) A Panova	4	6	3
(Spain) MT Torró Flor	6	4	3
(Serbia) B Jovanovski	2	6	6
(Croatia) M Lučić-Baroni	6^{4}	4
17	(Czech Republic) L Šafářová	7^{7}	6
29	(United States) S Stephens	6	6
(Romania) S Halep	1	1
(France) K Mladenovic	6	4	11
(Hungary) T Babos	3	6	9
(United States) M Oudin	2	3
(United Kingdom) L Robson	6	6
(Italy) F Schiavone	4	6	2
8	(Czech Republic) P Kvitová	6	2	6

Second round
(Japan) K Date-Krumm	6	7
(Israel) S Pe'er	2	5
(Serbia) B Jovanovski	7	7
17	(Czech Republic) L Šafářová	5	5
29	(United States) S Stephens	6	6
(France) K Mladenovic	4	3
(United Kingdom) L Robson	2	6	11
8	(Czech Republic) P Kvitová	6	3	9

Third round
(Japan) K Date-Krumm	2	6^{3}
(Serbia) B Jovanovski	6	7^{7}
29	(United States) S Stephens	7	6
(United Kingdom) L Robson	5	3

Fourth round
(Serbia) B Jovanovski	1	6	5
29	(United States) S Stephens	6	3	7

=== Bottom half ===
==== Section 5 ====
First round
6	(China) N Li	6	6
(Kazakhstan) S Karatantcheva	1	3
(France) P Parmentier	6	3	2
(Belarus) O Govortsova	2	6	6
(Czech Republic) Kr Plíšková	6	6
WC	(Australia) S Jones	3	2
(United States) C Vandeweghe	4	2
27	(Romania) S Cîrstea	6	6
18	(Germany) J Görges	7	2	6
Q	(Russia) V Dushevina	5	6	4
(Switzerland) R Oprandi	4	7	6
(Bulgaria) T Pironkova	6	5	2
WC	(China) Y Zhang	1	6	4
(China) J Zheng	6	3	6
(Chinese Taipei) K-c Chang	6^{3}	3
9	(Australia) S Stosur	7^{7}	6

Second round
6	(China) N Li	6	7
(Belarus) O Govortsova	2	5
(Czech Republic) Kr Plíšková	6	3	2
27	(Romania) S Cîrstea	1	6	6
18	(Germany) J Görges	6	6
(Switzerland) R Oprandi	3	2
(China) J Zheng	6	1	7
9	(Australia) S Stosur	4	6	5

Third round
6	(China) N Li	6	6
27	(Romania) S Cîrstea	4	1
18	(Germany) J Görges	6	1	7
(China) J Zheng	3	6	5

Fourth round
6	(China) N Li	7^{8}	6
18	(Germany) J Görges	6^{6}	1

==== Section 6 ====
First round
13	(Serbia) A Ivanovic	6	6
(Hungary) M Czink	2	1
Q	(Chinese Taipei) Y-j Chan	6	1	6
(Slovakia) D Hantuchová	1	6	1
Q	(Portugal) MJ Koehler	3	6	6
Q	(Italy) K Knapp	6	3	3
(Sweden) J Larsson	2	2
22	(Serbia) J Janković	6	6
32	(Germany) M Barthel	5	6	4
(Kazakhstan) K Pervak	7	2	6
(United Kingdom) H Watson	2	6	6
(Romania) A Cadanțu	6	3	2
(Romania) I-C Begu	6	6
(Netherlands) A Rus	4	2
WC	(Australia) B Bobusic	5	0
4	(Poland) A Radwańska	7	6

Second round
13	(Serbia) A Ivanovic	7	1	6
Q	(Chinese Taipei) Y-j Chan	5	6	4
Q	(Portugal) MJ Koehler	6	6^{5}	2
22	(Serbia) J Janković	2	7^{7}	6
(Kazakhstan) K Pervak	6	6^{7}	2
(United Kingdom) H Watson	4	7^{9}	6
(Romania) I-C Begu	3	3
4	(Poland) A Radwańska	6	6

Third round
13	(Serbia) A Ivanovic	7	6
22	(Serbia) J Janković	5	3
(United Kingdom) H Watson	3	1
4	(Poland) A Radwańska	6	6

Fourth round
13	(Serbia) A Ivanovic	2	4
4	(Poland) A Radwańska	6	6

==== Section 7 ====
First round
5	(Germany) A Kerber	6	6
(Ukraine) E Svitolina	2	4
(Czech Republic) L Hradecká	6	7^{10}
(Netherlands) K Bertens	2	6^{8}
(Australia) C Dellacqua	4	6^{0}
WC	(United States) M Keys	6	7^{7}
(Switzerland) S Vögele	6	4	5
30	(Austria) T Paszek	4	6	7
19	(Russia) E Makarova	6	7
Q	(Portugal) M Larcher de Brito	2	5
(Italy) C Giorgi	2	3
(France) S Foretz Gacon	6	6
Q	(Serbia) V Dolonc	5	7	8
WC	(Australia) O Rogowska	7	5	6
(Spain) A Medina Garrigues	2	4
11	(France) M Bartoli	6	6

Second round
5	(Germany) A Kerber	6	6
(Czech Republic) L Hradecká	3	1
WC	(United States) M Keys	6	6
30	(Austria) T Paszek	2	1
19	(Russia) E Makarova	6	6
(France) S Foretz Gacon	3	3
Q	(Serbia) V Dolonc	5	0
11	(France) M Bartoli	7	6

Third round
5	(Germany) A Kerber	6	7
WC	(United States) M Keys	2	5
19	(Russia) E Makarova	6^{4}	6	6
11	(France) M Bartoli	7^{7}	3	4

Fourth round
5	(Germany) A Kerber	5	4
19	(Russia) E Makarova	7	6

==== Section 8 ====
First round
15	(Slovakia) D Cibulková	3	6	6
WC	(Australia) A Barty	6	0	1
(Luxembourg) M Minella	6^{4}	1
Q	(Russia) V Savinykh	7^{7}	6
(Belgium) K Flipkens	6	6
(Russia) N Bratchikova	4	3
(South Africa) C Scheepers	1	2
23	(Czech Republic) K Zakopalová	6	6
25	(United States) V Williams	6	6
(Kazakhstan) G Voskoboeva	1	0
(France) A Cornet	7	6^{3}	10
(New Zealand) M Erakovic	5	7^{7}	8
(Croatia) P Martić	3	4
(Japan) M Doi	6	6
(Russia) O Puchkova	0	0
2	(Russia) M Sharapova	6	6

Second round
15	(Slovakia) D Cibulková	6^{6}	4
Q	(Russia) V Savinykh	7^{8}	6
(Belgium) K Flipkens	6	6
23	(Czech Republic) K Zakopalová	1	0
25	(United States) V Williams	6	6
(France) A Cornet	3	3
(Japan) M Doi	0	0
2	(Russia) M Sharapova	6	6

Third round
Q	(Russia) V Savinykh	2	6	3
(Belgium) K Flipkens	6	4	6
25	(United States) V Williams	1	3
2	(Russia) M Sharapova	6	6

Fourth round
(Belgium) K Flipkens	1	0
2	(Russia) M Sharapova	6	6

== Championship match statistics ==
Category	(Belarus) Azarenka	(China) Li
1st serve %	76/97 (78%)	62/95 (65%)
1st serve points won	41 of 76 = 54%	30 of 62 = 48%
2nd serve points won	8 of 21 = 38%	14 of 33 = 42%
Total service points won	49 of 97 = 50.52%	44 of 95 = 46.32%
Aces	1	4
Double faults	4	5
Winners	18	36
Unforced errors	28	57
Net points won	8 of 14 = 57%	7 of 11 = 64%
Break points converted	9 of 12 = 75%	7 of 18 = 39%
Return points won	51 of 95 = 54%	48 of 97 = 49%
Total points won	100	92

Preceded by 2012 US Open – Women's singles	Grand Slam women's singles	Succeeded by 2013 French Open – Women's singles
