= 2013 Moorilla Hobart International =

- Date: 6–12 January
- Edition: 20th
- Category: WTA International tournaments
- Draw: 32S / 16D
- Prize money: €235,000
- Surface: Hard
- Location: Hobart, Australia

Champions

Singles
- (Russia) Elena Vesnina

Doubles
- (Spain) Garbiñe Muguruza / (Spain) María Teresa Torró Flor
← 2012 ·	Moorilla Hobart International	· 2014 →

The 2013 Moorilla Hobart International was a men's tennis tournament played on outdoor hard courts. It was the 20th edition of the event and part of the WTA International tournaments of the 2013 WTA Tour. It took place at the Hobart International Tennis Centre in Hobart, Australia from 6 through 12 January 2013. Unseeded Elena Vesnina wo the singles title.

== Finals ==
=== Singles ===
- (Russia) Elena Vesnina defeated (Germany) Mona Barthel, 6–3, 6–4

=== Doubles ===
- (Spain) Garbiñe Muguruza / (Spain) María Teresa Torró Flor defeated (Hungary) Tímea Babos / (Luxembourg) Mandy Minella, 6–3, 7–6^{(7–5)}

== Single main-draw entrants ==
=== Seeds ===
Country	Player	Rank^{1}	Seed
TPE	Hsieh Su-wei	25	1
ROU	Sorana Cîrstea	27	2
CZE	Klára Zakopalová	28	3
KAZ	Yaroslava Shvedova	29	4
ESP	Carla Suárez Navarro	34	5
ITA	Francesca Schiavone	35	6
~~RUS~~	~~Anastasia Pavlyuchenkova~~	~~36~~	~~7~~
USA	Sloane Stephens	38	8
GER	Mona Barthel	39	9

- ^{1} Rankings as of 31 December 2012.

=== Other entrants ===
The following players received wildcards into the singles main draw:

- (Australia) Ashleigh Barty
- (Australia) Bojana Bobusic
- (Australia) Jarmila Gajdošová

The following players received entry from the qualifying draw:

- (Spain) Lara Arruabarrena Vecino
- (United States) Lauren Davis
- (Spain) Sílvia Soler Espinosa
- (Luxembourg) Mandy Minella

The following players received entry as lucky losers:

- (Russia) Nina Bratchikova
- (Spain) María Teresa Torró Flor

=== Withdrawals ===
Before the tournament

- (Czech Republic) Petra Cetkovská
- (Spain) Anabel Medina Garrigues (abdominal injury)
- (Russia) Anastasia Pavlyuchenkova (left hip injury)
- (United Kingdom) Heather Watson (elbow injury)

== Doubles main-draw entrants ==
=== Seeds ===
Country	Player	Country	Player	Rank^{1}	Seed
ESP	Anabel Medina Garrigues	KAZ	Yaroslava Shvedova	50	1
AUS	Jarmila Gajdošová	CZE	Klára Zakopalová	116	2
RUS	Nina Bratchikova	SVK	Janette Husárová	123	3
LAT	Līga Dekmeijere	USA	Megan Moulton-Levy	157	4

- ^{1} Rankings as of 31 December 2012.

=== Other entrants ===
The following pairs received wildcards into the doubles main draw:

- (Australia) Vanessa Dobson / (Australia) Karolina Wlodarczak
- (Australia) Alyssa Hibberd / (Australia) Joanna Smith

=== Withdrawals ===
Before the tournament

- (Spain) Anabel Medina Garrigues (abdominal injury)

During the tournament

- (Czech Republic) Klára Zakopalová (ankle injury)
