= 2012 Moorilla Hobart International =

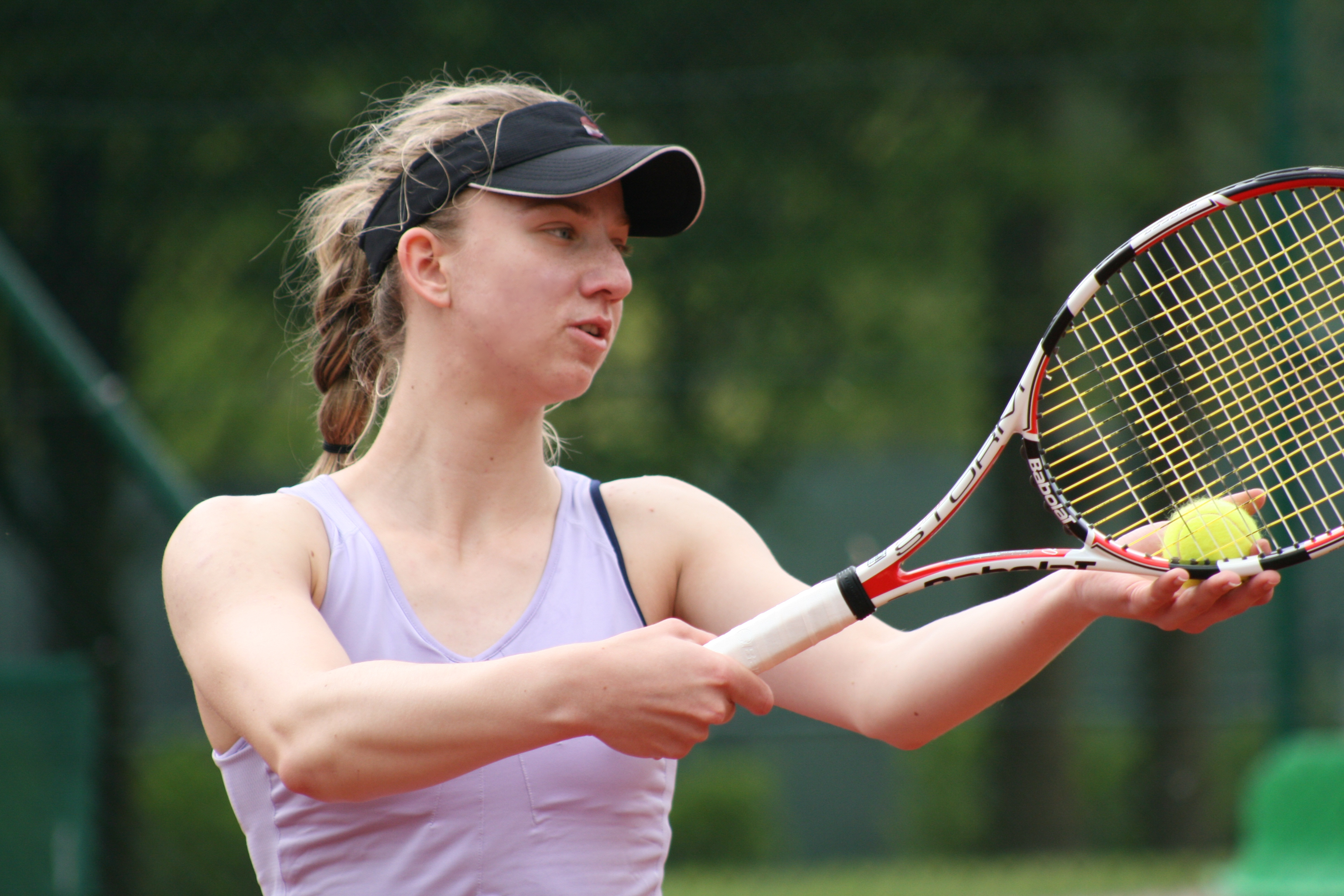
- Date: 6–14 January
- Edition: 19th
- Category: WTA International tournaments

Champions

Singles
- (Germany) Mona Barthel

Doubles
- (Romania) Irina-Camelia Begu / (Romania) Monica Niculescu
- Moorilla Hobart International

The 2012 Moorilla Hobart International was a women's tennis tournament played on outdoor hard courts. It was the 19th edition of the event and part of the WTA International tournaments of the 2012 WTA Tour. It took place at the Hobart International Tennis Centre in Hobart, Australia, from 6 January through 14 January 2012. Unseeded Mona Barthel won the singles title.

== Finals ==
=== Singles ===
(Germany) Mona Barthel defeated (Belgium) Yanina Wickmayer, 6–1, 6–2

- It was Barthel's first career title.

=== Doubles ===
(Romania) Irina-Camelia Begu / (Romania) Monica Niculescu defeated (Chinese Taipei) Chuang Chia-jung / (New Zealand) Marina Erakovic, 6–7^{(4–7)}, 7–6^{(7–4)}, [10–5]

== Single main-draw entrants ==
=== Seeds ===
Country	Player	Rank^{1}	Seed
BEL	Yanina Wickmayer	26	1
ESP	Anabel Medina Garrigues	27	2
ROU	Monica Niculescu	30	3
GER	Angelique Kerber	32	4
AUS	Jarmila Gajdošová	33	5
ISR	Shahar Pe'er	37	6
KAZ	Xeniya Pervak	39	7
ROU	Irina-Camelia Begu	40	8

- ^{1} Rankings are as of 26 December 2011

=== Other entrants ===
The following players received wildcards into the singles main draw:

- (Australia) Ashleigh Barty
- (Australia) Casey Dellacqua
- (Australia) Anastasia Rodionova

The following players received entry from the qualifying draw:

- (Germany) Mona Barthel
- (Australia) Sacha Jones
- (Italy) Romina Oprandi
- (United Kingdom) Heather Watson

The following players received entry from a lucky loser spot:

- (Germany) Kristina Barrois

=== Withdrawals ===
- (Russia) Anna Chakvetadze (left leg cramp)

== Doubles main-draw entrants ==
=== Seeds ===
Country	Player	Country	Player	Rank^{1}	Seed
CZE	Lucie Hradecká	ESP	Anabel Medina Garrigues	45	1
AUS	Jarmila Gajdošová	USA	Bethanie Mattek-Sands	58	2
TPE	Chuang Chia-jung	NZL	Marina Erakovic	95	3
ROU	Irina-Camelia Begu	ROU	Monica Niculescu	114	4

- ^{1} Rankings are as of 26 December 2011

=== Retirements ===
- (United States) Bethanie Mattek-Sands (neck injury)
