= 2012 Australian Open – Women's singles =

Women's singles
- 2012 Australian Open

Final
- Champion: (Belarus) Victoria Azarenka
- Runner-up: (Russia) Maria Sharapova
- Score: 6–3, 6–0

Details
- Draw: 128 (12Q / 8WC)
- Seeds: 32

Events
| Singles | men | women | | boys | girls |
| Doubles | men | women | mixed | boys | girls |
| WC Singles | men | women | quad |
| WC Doubles | men | women | quad |
| Legends | men | women | mixed |
- Australian Open

Victoria Azarenka defeated Maria Sharapova in the final, 6–3, 6–0 to win the women's singles tennis title at the 2012 Australian Open. It was her first major title. Azarenka was the first Belarusian to win a singles major, and became the world No. 1 in doing so. (Note: Azarenka became the first player to achieve these feats while representing Belarus as an independent country, following its independence from the Soviet Union in 1991. Natasha Zvereva, who reached the 1988 French Open final, did so when Belarus (then known as Byelorussia) was part of the Soviet Union.) Caroline Wozniacki, Petra Kvitová and Sharapova were also in contention for the top ranking.

Kim Clijsters was the defending champion, but was defeated in the semifinals by Azarenka.

For the first time in the tournament's history, all eight quarterfinalists were European. This was also the first major main draw appearance for future three-time major champion and world No. 1 Ashleigh Barty, who was defeated in the first round by Anna Tatishvili.

This tournament marked the first Australian Open appearance of future champion Madison Keys; she lost to Zheng Jie in the first round.

== Seeds ==
1. (Denmark) Caroline Wozniacki (quarterfinals)
2. (Czech Republic) Petra Kvitová (semifinals)
3. (Belarus) Victoria Azarenka (champion)
4. (Russia) Maria Sharapova (final)
5. (China) Li Na (fourth round)
6. (Australia) Samantha Stosur (first round)
7. (Russia) Vera Zvonareva (third round)
8. (Poland) Agnieszka Radwańska (quarterfinals)
9. (France) Marion Bartoli (third round)
10. (Italy) Francesca Schiavone (second round)
11. (Belgium) Kim Clijsters (semifinals)
12. (United States) Serena Williams (fourth round)
13. (Serbia) Jelena Janković (fourth round)
14. (Germany) Sabine Lisicki (fourth round)
15. (Russia) Anastasia Pavlyuchenkova (second round)
16. (China) Peng Shuai (second round)

17. (Slovakia) Dominika Cibulková (second round)
18. (Russia) Svetlana Kuznetsova (third round)
19. (Italy) Flavia Pennetta (first round)
20. (Slovakia) Daniela Hantuchová (third round)
21. (Serbia) Ana Ivanovic (fourth round)
22. (Germany) Julia Görges (fourth round)
23. (Italy) Roberta Vinci (second round)
24. (Czech Republic) Lucie Šafářová (first round)
25. (Estonia) Kaia Kanepi (second round)
26. (Spain) Anabel Medina Garrigues (third round, retired because of a right ankle injury)
27. (Russia) Maria Kirilenko (third round, retired because of a left leg injury)
28. (Belgium) Yanina Wickmayer (first round)
29. (Russia) Nadia Petrova (second round)
30. (Germany) Angelique Kerber (third round)
31. (Romania) Monica Niculescu (third round)
32. (Czech Republic) Petra Cetkovská (second round)

Click on the seed number of a player to go to their draw section.

== Draw ==
Key

- Q = Qualifier
- WC = Wild card
- LL = Lucky loser
- Alt = Alternate
- ITF = ITF entry
- PR = Protected ranking
- SR = Special ranking
- SE = Special exempt
- JE = Junior exempt
- JR = Junior Accelerator Programme entrant
- CO = College Accelerator Programme entrant
- NG = Next Gen Accelerator Program entrant
- w/o = Walkover
- r = Retired
- d = Defaulted

=== Finals ===
Quarterfinals
1 | (Denmark) Caroline Wozniacki | 3 | 6^{4}
11 | (Belgium) Kim Clijsters | 6 | 7^{7}
3 | (Belarus) Victoria Azarenka | 6^{0} | 6 | 6
8 | (Poland) Agnieszka Radwańska | 7^{7} | 0 | 2
(Russia) Ekaterina Makarova | 2 | 3
4 | (Russia) Maria Sharapova | 6 | 6
(Italy) Sara Errani | 4 | 4
2 | (Czech Republic) Petra Kvitová | 6 | 6

Semifinals
11 | (Belgium) Kim Clijsters | 4 | 6 | 3
3 | (Belarus) Victoria Azarenka | 6 | 1 | 6
4 | (Russia) Maria Sharapova | 6 | 3 | 6
2 | (Czech Republic) Petra Kvitová | 2 | 6 | 4

Final
3 | (Belarus) Victoria Azarenka | 6 | 6
4 | (Russia) Maria Sharapova | 3 | 0

=== Top half ===
==== Section 1 ====
First round
1 | (Denmark) C Wozniacki | 6 | 6
(Australia) An Rodionova | 2 | 1
WC | (Australia) A Barty | 2 | 6^{4}
(Georgia (country)) A Tatishvili | 6 | 7^{7}
(France) P Parmentier | 6 | 5 | 6
(Russia) A Kudryavtseva | 3 | 7 | 3
(France) A Cornet | 7 | 0 | 3
31 | (Romania) M Niculescu | 5 | 6 | 6
24 | (Czech Republic) L Šafářová | 2 | 4
(United States) C McHale | 6 | 6
Q | (France) I Pavlovic | 5 | 6^{4}
(New Zealand) M Erakovic | 7 | 7^{7}
Q | (Chinese Taipei) K-c Chang | 6 | 6
(Croatia) P Martić | 4 | 2
Q | (United Kingdom) L Robson | 2 | 0
13 | (Serbia) J Janković | 6 | 6

Second round
1 | (Denmark) C Wozniacki | 6 | 7^{7}
(Georgia (country)) A Tatishvili | 1 | 6^{4}
(France) P Parmentier | 6 | 4 | 1
31 | (Romania) M Niculescu | 4 | 6 | 6
(United States) C McHale | 3 | 7^{7} | 6
(New Zealand) M Erakovic | 6 | 6^{4} | 3
Q | (Chinese Taipei) K-c Chang | 4 | 2
13 | (Serbia) J Janković | 6 | 6

Third round
1 | (Denmark) C Wozniacki | 6 | 6
31 | (Romania) M Niculescu | 2 | 2
(United States) C McHale | 2 | 0
13 | (Serbia) J Janković | 6 | 6

Fourth round
1 | (Denmark) C Wozniacki | 6 | 7
13 | (Serbia) J Janković | 0 | 5

==== Section 2 ====
First round
11 | (Belgium) K Clijsters | 7 | 6
Q | (Portugal) MJ Köhler | 5 | 1
(France) S Foretz Gacon | 6 | 6
(United Kingdom) E Baltacha | 2 | 4
(Netherlands) A Rus | 6^{4} | 1
(Ukraine) L Tsurenko | 7^{7} | 6
Q | (United States) V Lepchenko | 6 | 3 | 2
20 | (Slovakia) D Hantuchová | 4 | 6 | 6
26 | (Spain) A Medina Garrigues | 6 | 6
(Czech Republic) E Birnerová | 3 | 3
(Austria) P Mayr-Achleitner | 2 | 4
(Belarus) O Govortsova | 6 | 6
(Sweden) S Arvidsson | 3 | 1
WC | (Australia) O Rogowska | 6 | 6
(Kazakhstan) K Pervak | 3 | 1
5 | (China) N Li | 6 | 6

Second round
11 | (Belgium) K Clijsters | 6 | 6
(France) S Foretz Gacon | 0 | 1
(Ukraine) L Tsurenko | 6 | 4 | 3
20 | (Slovakia) D Hantuchová | 4 | 6 | 6
26 | (Spain) A Medina Garrigues | 6 | 6
(Belarus) O Govortsova | 1 | 0
WC | (Australia) O Rogowska | 2 | 2
5 | (China) N Li | 6 | 6

Third round
11 | (Belgium) K Clijsters | 6 | 6
20 | (Slovakia) D Hantuchová | 3 | 2
26 | (Spain) A Medina Garrigues | 0^{r}
5 | (China) N Li (Note: Li Na advanced to the fourth round after Anabel Medina Garrigues was forced to retire during the first set because of a right ankle injury.) | 3

Fourth round
11 | (Belgium) K Clijsters | 4 | 7^{8} | 6
5 | (China) N Li | 6 | 6^{6} | 4

==== Section 3 ====
First round
3 | (Belarus) V Azarenka | 6 | 6
(United Kingdom) H Watson | 1 | 0
WC | (Australia) C Dellacqua | 6 | 6
(Serbia) B Jovanovski | 3 | 2
(United Kingdom) A Keothavong | 0^{r}
(Germany) M Barthel (Note: Mona Barthel advanced to the second round after Anne Keothavong was forced to retire after the first set because of foodborne illness.) | 6
(Japan) A Morita | 6 | 1 | 5
32 | (Czech Republic) P Cetkovská | 3 | 6 | 7
19 | (Italy) F Pennetta | 3 | 6 | 2
Q | (Russia) N Bratchikova | 6 | 1 | 6
(Italy) A Brianti | 6 | 7
(United States) I Falconi | 2 | 5
(Czech Republic) I Benešová | 6 | 2 | 6
(France) M Johansson | 3 | 6 | 4
WC | (France) A Rezaï | 3 | 4
16 | (China) S Peng | 6 | 6

Second round
3 | (Belarus) V Azarenka | 6 | 6
WC | (Australia) C Dellacqua | 1 | 0
(Germany) M Barthel | 7 | 6
32 | (Czech Republic) P Cetkovská | 5 | 3
Q | (Russia) N Bratchikova | 6 | 6
(Italy) A Brianti | 2 | 1
(Czech Republic) I Benešová | 6 | 6
16 | (China) S Peng | 2 | 4

Third round
3 | (Belarus) V Azarenka | 6 | 6
(Germany) M Barthel | 2 | 4
Q | (Russia) N Bratchikova | 1 | 3
(Czech Republic) I Benešová | 6 | 6

Fourth round
3 | (Belarus) V Azarenka | 6 | 6
(Czech Republic) I Benešová | 2 | 2

==== Section 4 ====
First round
10 | (Italy) F Schiavone | 6 | 6
(Spain) L Pous Tió | 1 | 3
(Belarus) A Yakimova | 4 | 1
(Italy) R Oprandi | 6 | 6
(Japan) K Date-Krumm | 3 | 2
(Greece) E Daniilidou | 6 | 6
(Slovenia) P Hercog | 3 | 6^{3}
22 | (Germany) J Görges | 6 | 7^{7}
28 | (Belgium) Y Wickmayer | 5 | 2
(Kazakhstan) G Voskoboeva | 7 | 6
(Bulgaria) T Pironkova | 6 | 6
(India) S Mirza | 4 | 2
Q | (Argentina) P Ormaechea | 6 | 3 | 7
(Romania) S Halep | 1 | 6 | 5
(United States) B Mattek-Sands | 7^{12} | 4 | 2
8 | (Poland) A Radwańska | 6^{10} | 6 | 6

Second round
10 | (Italy) F Schiavone | 4 | 3
(Italy) R Oprandi | 6 | 6
(Greece) E Daniilidou | 2 | 0^{r}
22 | (Germany) J Görges (Note: Julia Görges advanced to the third round after Eleni Daniilidou was forced to retire during the second set because of a neck injury.) | 6 | 2
(Kazakhstan) G Voskoboeva | 6 | 6
(Bulgaria) T Pironkova | 4 | 4
Q | (Argentina) P Ormaechea | 3 | 1
8 | (Poland) A Radwańska | 6 | 6

Third round
(Italy) R Oprandi | 6 | 3 | 1
22 | (Germany) J Görges | 3 | 6 | 6
(Kazakhstan) G Voskoboeva | 2 | 2
8 | (Poland) A Radwańska | 6 | 6

Fourth round
22 | (Germany) J Görges | 1 | 1
8 | (Poland) A Radwańska | 6 | 6

=== Bottom half ===
==== Section 5 ====
First round
7 | (Russia) V Zvonareva | 7^{7} | 6^{5} | 6
(Romania) A Dulgheru | 6^{4} | 7^{7} | 3
(Russia) E Rodina | 3 | 1
(Czech Republic) L Hradecká | 6 | 6
(Russia) E Makarova | 6 | 2 | 6
(Thailand) T Tanasugarn | 0 | 6 | 0
(Sweden) J Larsson | 2 | 4
25 | (Estonia) K Kanepi | 6 | 6
17 | (Slovakia) D Cibulková | 6 | 6
(Slovakia) M Rybáriková | 3 | 1
(Canada) R Marino | 4 | 2
(Hungary) G Arn | 6 | 6
(France) I Brémond | 0 | 4
(Czech Republic) B Záhlavová-Strýcová | 6 | 6
(Austria) T Paszek | 3 | 2
12 | (United States) S Williams | 6 | 6

Second round
7 | (Russia) V Zvonareva | 6 | 7^{7}
(Czech Republic) L Hradecká | 1 | 6^{3}
(Russia) E Makarova | 6 | 7
25 | (Estonia) K Kanepi | 2 | 5
17 | (Slovakia) D Cibulková | 2 | 6 | 8
(Hungary) G Arn | 6 | 3 | 10
(Czech Republic) B Záhlavová-Strýcová | 0 | 4
12 | (United States) S Williams | 6 | 6

Third round
7 | (Russia) V Zvonareva | 6^{7} | 1
(Russia) E Makarova | 7^{9} | 6
(Hungary) G Arn | 1 | 1
12 | (United States) S Williams | 6 | 6

Fourth round
(Russia) E Makarova | 6 | 6
12 | (United States) S Williams | 2 | 3

==== Section 6 ====
First round
14 | (Germany) S Lisicki | 6 | 4 | 6
Q | (Switzerland) S Vögele | 2 | 6 | 4
(Israel) S Pe'er | 6 | 6
WC | (Australia) I Holland | 2 | 0
(United States) S Stephens | 6 | 6
(Spain) S Soler-Espinosa | 4 | 2
(South Africa) C Scheepers | 3 | 6 | 0
18 | (Russia) S Kuznetsova | 6 | 3 | 6
30 | (Germany) A Kerber | 6 | 6
WC | (Australia) B Bobusic | 1 | 3
(Canada) S Dubois | 6 | 1 | 6
(Russia) E Vesnina | 4 | 6 | 4
(Luxembourg) M Minella | 1 | 1
Q | (United States) J Hampton | 6 | 6
(Argentina) G Dulko | 0 | 1
4 | (Russia) M Sharapova | 6 | 6

Second round
14 | (Germany) S Lisicki | 6 | 6
(Israel) S Pe'er | 1 | 2
(United States) S Stephens | 6^{6} | 5
18 | (Russia) S Kuznetsova | 7^{8} | 7
30 | (Germany) A Kerber | 7 | 6
(Canada) S Dubois | 5 | 1
Q | (United States) J Hampton | 0 | 1
4 | (Russia) M Sharapova | 6 | 6

Third round
14 | (Germany) S Lisicki | 2 | 6 | 6
18 | (Russia) S Kuznetsova | 6 | 4 | 2
30 | (Germany) A Kerber | 1 | 2
4 | (Russia) M Sharapova | 6 | 6

Fourth round
14 | (Germany) S Lisicki | 6 | 2 | 3
4 | (Russia) M Sharapova | 3 | 6 | 6

==== Section 7 ====
First round
6 | (Australia) S Stosur | 6^{2} | 3
(Romania) S Cîrstea | 7^{7} | 6
Q | (United States) A Riske | 4 | 6 | 2
(Poland) U Radwańska | 6 | 1 | 6
Q | (Russia) V Savinykh | 2 | 1
(Italy) S Errani | 6 | 6
Q | (Czech Republic) A Hlaváčková | 3 | 6 | 0
29 | (Russia) N Petrova | 6 | 3 | 6
23 | (Italy) R Vinci | 6 | 6
(Romania) A Cadanțu | 0 | 1
WC | (United States) M Keys | 2 | 1
(China) J Zheng | 6 | 6
(Australia) J Dokić | 6 | 6
PR | (Russia) A Chakvetadze | 2 | 1
(France) V Razzano | 5 | 0
9 | (France) M Bartoli | 7 | 6

Second round
(Romania) S Cîrstea | 1 | 6 | 6
(Poland) U Radwańska | 6 | 2 | 3
(Italy) S Errani | 6 | 6
29 | (Russia) N Petrova | 2 | 2
23 | (Italy) R Vinci | 4 | 2
(China) J Zheng | 6 | 6
(Australia) J Dokić | 3 | 2
9 | (France) M Bartoli | 6 | 6

Third round
(Romania) S Cîrstea | 7^{8} | 0 | 2
(Italy) S Errani | 6^{6} | 6 | 6
(China) J Zheng | 6 | 6
9 | (France) M Bartoli | 3 | 3

Fourth round
(Italy) S Errani | 6 | 6
(China) J Zheng | 2 | 1

==== Section 8 ====
First round
15 | (Russia) A Pavlyuchenkova | 7^{7} | 6
(Czech Republic) K Zakopalová | 6^{5} | 1
(Ukraine) K Bondarenko | 6^{3} | 3
(United States) V King | 7^{7} | 6
(Germany) K Barrois | 3 | 6^{13}
(Netherlands) M Krajicek | 6 | 7^{15}
(Spain) L Domínguez Lino | 0 | 3
21 | (Serbia) A Ivanovic | 6 | 6
27 | (Russia) M Kirilenko | 6 | 6
(Australia) J Gajdošová | 4 | 2
WC | (China) S Zhang | 3 | 3
(Canada) A Wozniak | 6 | 6
(Romania) I-C Begu | 1 | 5
(Spain) C Suárez Navarro | 6 | 7
(Russia) V Dushevina | 2 | 0
2 | (Czech Republic) P Kvitová | 6 | 6

Second round
15 | (Russia) A Pavlyuchenkova | 7 | 3 | 4
(United States) V King | 5 | 6 | 6
(Netherlands) M Krajicek | 2 | 3
21 | (Serbia) A Ivanovic | 6 | 6
27 | (Russia) M Kirilenko | 6 | 1 | 6
(Canada) A Wozniak | 4 | 6 | 2
(Spain) C Suárez Navarro | 2 | 6 | 4
2 | (Czech Republic) P Kvitová | 6 | 2 | 6

Third round
(United States) V King | 3 | 4
21 | (Serbia) A Ivanovic | 6 | 6
27 | (Russia) M Kirilenko | 0 | 0^{r}
2 | (Czech Republic) P Kvitová (Note: Petra Kvitová advanced to the fourth round after Maria Kirilenko was forced to retire during the second set because of a left leg injury.) | 6 | 1

Fourth round
21 | (Serbia) A Ivanovic | 2 | 6^{2}
2 | (Czech Republic) P Kvitová | 6 | 7^{7}

== Championship match statistics ==
| Category | (Belarus) Azarenka | (Russia) Sharapova |
|---|---|---|
| 1st serve % | 37/52 (71%) | 30/47 (64%) |
| 1st serve points won | 25 of 37 = 68% | 16 of 30 = 53% |
| 2nd serve points won | 8 of 15 = 53% | 3 of 17 = 18% |
| Total service points won | 33 of 52 = 63.46% | 19 of 47 = 40.43% |
| Aces | 0 | 1 |
| Double faults | 4 | 3 |
| Winners | 14 | 14 |
| Unforced errors | 12 | 30 |
| Net points won | 6 of 7 = 86% | 4 of 9 = 44% |
| Break points converted | 5 of 7 = 71% | 1 of 4 = 25% |
| Return points won | 28 of 47 = 60% | 19 of 52 = 37% |
| Total points won | 61 | 38 |

== Notes ==
| Preceded by 2011 US Open – Women's singles | Grand Slam women's singles | Succeeded by 2012 French Open – Women's singles |
