= Irina-Camelia Begu =

Romanian tennis player (born 1990)

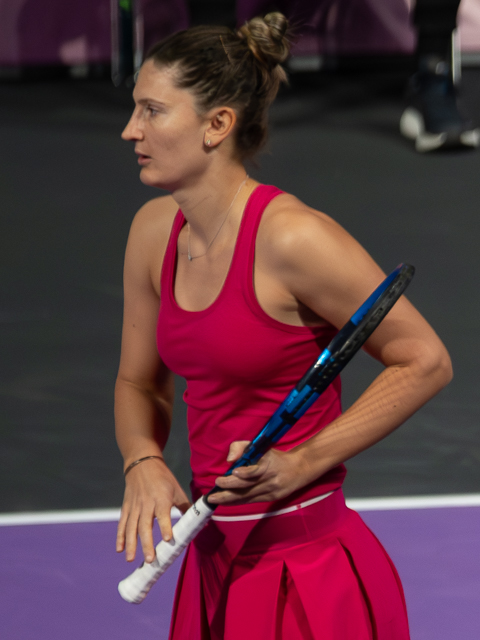
- Begu at the 2025 Transylvania Open
- Country (sports): Romania
- Residence: Bucharest, Romania
- Born: 26 August 1990 (age 36) Bucharest
- Height: 1.81 m (5 ft 11 in)
- Turned pro: 2005
- Plays: Right-handed (two-handed backhand)
- Coach: Victor Crivoi
- Prize money: US$ 9,074,683

Singles
- Career record: 527–368
- Career titles: 6
- Highest ranking: No. 22 (22 August 2016)
- Current ranking: No. 451 (21 September 2026)

Grand Slam singles results
- Australian Open: 4R (2015)
- French Open: 4R (2016, 2022)
- Wimbledon: 3R (2015, 2021, 2022)
- US Open: 2R (2012, 2014, 2018, 2022)

Other tournaments
- Olympic Games: 1R (2012, 2016, 2024)

Doubles
- Career record: 291–201
- Career titles: 9
- Highest ranking: No. 22 (1 October 2018)
- Current ranking: No. 1,620 (21 September 2026)

Grand Slam doubles results
- Australian Open: SF (2018)
- French Open: SF (2021)
- Wimbledon: QF (2018)
- US Open: 3R (2015)

Other doubles tournaments
- Olympic Games: 1R (2016, 2024)

Grand Slam mixed doubles results
- Australian Open: 2R (2017)

Other mixed doubles tournaments
- Olympic Games: QF (2016)

Team competitions
- Fed Cup: 15–12
- Last updated on: 22 September 2026.

Irina-Camelia Begu (born 26 August 1990) is a Romanian tennis player. She reached a career-high WTA singles ranking of No. 22 in August 2016. Two years later, she reached her highest ranking in doubles, also No. 22.

Begu has won six singles titles and nine doubles titles on the WTA Tour. She also has won three singles titles on the WTA Challenger Tour, with 12 singles and 19 doubles titles on the ITF Women's Circuit.

As a junior, she reached the semifinals of the 2007 Wimbledon Championships, partnering with Oksana Kalashnikova. Later, as a senior, she continued with Grand Slam doubles success. She reached the semifinal at the 2018 Australian Open and quarterfinals of the 2017 French Open and 2018 Wimbledon Championships. In singles, reaching the round of 16 has been her best Grand Slam result at the 2015 Australian Open, 2016 French Open and 2022 French Open.

In singles, she reached one Premier final, at the 2014 Kremlin Cup, but lost to Anastasia Pavlyuchenkova. Her other significant results in singles include two quarterfinals of the Premier Mandatory-level Madrid Open in 2015 and 2016 and semifinal of the Premier 5 Italian Open in 2016. In doubles, she has never won higher level tournament than International, but reached the final of the Premier-5 Wuhan Open in 2015, as well as two Premier-level finals at the Kremlin Cup in 2015 and Eastbourne International in 2018.

== Early life and background ==
Begu was born on 26 August 1990 in Bucharest. Her mother Steluţa is a civil servant, while her father Paul is an electrician. She has an older brother, Andrei. She started playing tennis when she was three-and-a-half years old as her aunt, former tennis player Aurelia Gheorghe, introduced her to the sport. At junior ages, she also did gymnastics and played handball. At the age of 14, Irina took part in a one-month tour promoted by the ITF with seven other girls and eight boys, joining the likes of Grigor Dimitrov and Ricardas Berankis. Her idol growing up was Martina Hingis.

== Career ==
=== Juniors ===
Begu is a former junior world No. 14. She achieved this ranking on 27 August 2007, day after she turned 17. She made her singles ITF Junior Circuit debut at the Grade-4 Wilson ITF Junior Classic in Salzburg in January 2005. In March 2005, she made her doubles debut at the Grade-3 Trofeul D Sturdza in Moldova. She won one singles and three doubles title in total on the ITF junior tour.

She won her first singles junior title at the Grade-2 Raquette d'Or in Mohammedia in June 2006. The following week, she reached another Grade-2 final, but this time in Casablanca, where she lost. In December 2006, she made her debut at the Orange Bowl, where she reached third round in singles and first round in doubles. She followed this with semifinal of the Grade-1 Yucatán World Cup in singles, but there won the title in doubles. She then finished season of 2006 with quarterfinal of the Grade-A International Casablanca Junior Cup in Tlalnepantla.

She started the 2007 season with the quarterfinal of the Grade-1 Coffee Bowl in San José. Nearly after that, she reached semifinal of the Grade-1 Czech International Junior Indoor Championships in Přerov. In April 2007, she won Grade-1 Perin Memorial in doubles in Umag. In May 2007, she reached semifinal of the Grade-1 International Junior Tournament "Città di Santa Croce". The following week, she played at the Trofeo Bonfiglio and reached quarterfinal, losing there to Anastasia Pivovarova. At the 2007 French Open, she made her major debut, but lost in the first round to Ksenia Lykina. She lost in the first round of the doubles draw, as well. She then reached singles final of the Grade-1 International Junior Tournament of Offenbach, but won the title in doubles.

At Wimbledon in 2007, she lost in the first round to Arantxa Rus; in doubles, she reached semifinal alongside Oksana Kalashnikova. They lost to Misaki Doi and Kurumi Nara. The 2008 French Open was her last junior tournament, she lost in the first round in both singles and doubles.

=== 2005–10: Early professional years ===
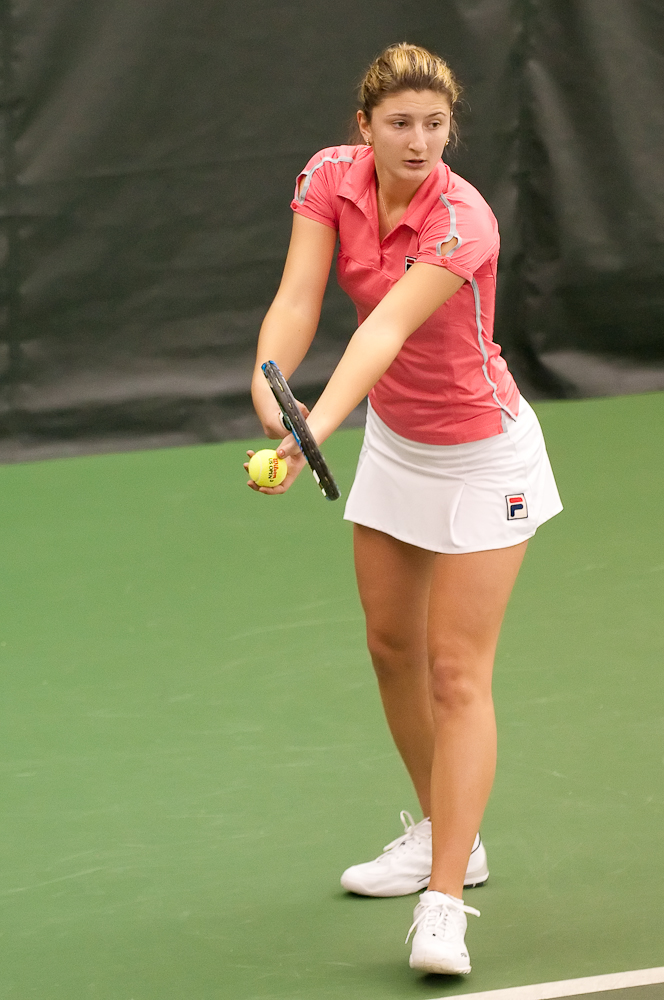
Begu in 2009

==== Singles ====
Begu made her ITF Women's Circuit debut at a 10k event at Bucharest in May 2005. In September 2006, she reached her first ITF final at Bucharest, but lost to Alexandra Cadanțu. Year later, she won her first ITF title at Brașov, defeating Andreea Mitu in the final. In October 2008, she won her first major ITF title at the 50k event in Jounieh, defeating Anastasiya Yakimova in the final. During the season of 2008, she was climbing more and more on the rankings, getting from top 800 to top 250 at the end of the year. At the 2009 French Open, she had her first major attempt to participate in the main draw, but failed in the final stage of the qualifications. In July 2009, she made her WTA Tour debut at the Hungarian Open, but lost to Shahar Pe'er in the first round.

==== Doubles ====
She made her ITF Circuit doubles debut in Câmpina in September 2005. In July 2006, she won her first ITF title at Galați. In May 2009, she won her first major ITF title at the 100k event in Bucharest, alongside Simona Halep. At the 2009 Palermo Ladies Open, she made her WTA Tour doubles debut. In August 2010, she won the 75k Bucharest, alongside Elena Bogdan. Later that year, she won three 25k titles and finished runner-up at a 50k event in Madrid and the 75k Toyota World Challenge.

=== 2011–12: First WTA Tour title ===
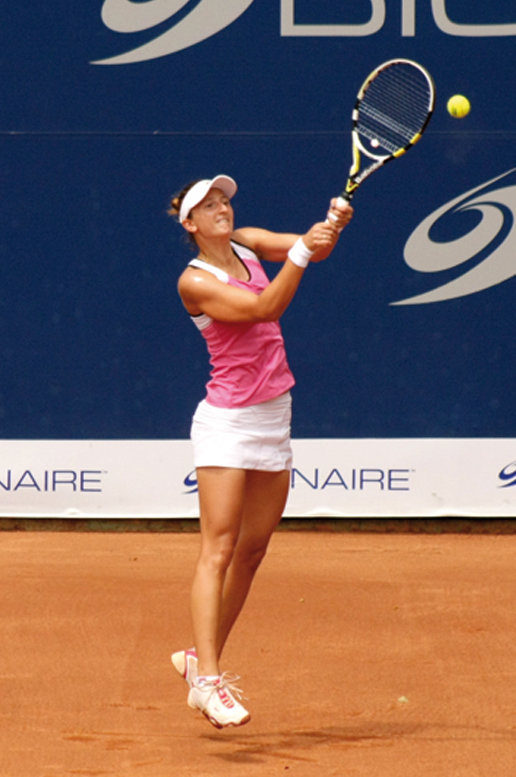
Begu won both the singles and the doubles trophies at Copa Bionaire and at the Romania Open

==== Singles ====
Begu continued to progress at the ITF Circuit, winning her first 100k title at the Copa Bionaire in Cali in February, after defeating Laura Pous Tió in straight sets in the final. In April, as a qualifier, she reached her first WTA Tour final at the Andalucia Tennis Experience. On her way to the final, she defeated then-top 40 Klára Koukalová and top 20 Svetlana Kuznetsova, before losing to Victoria Azarenka in the final. At the French Open, she made her Grand Slam main-draw debut. She recorded her first major win and lost to Svetlana Kuznetsova in the second round. In June, she returned to the ITF Circuit, where she reached the final of the 100k Open de Marseille, being defeated by Pauline Parmentier. Then, she returned to the WTA Tour and reached another final at the Hungarian Open, but lost to Roberta Vinci. After that, she won the 100k Bucharest event, defeating Laura Pous Tió in the final. She reached the semifinals of the Texas Open but lost to Sabine Lisicki. During the year, she progressed in the rankings, debuting in the top 100 in April and in the top 50 in July.

Begu continued to progress on the WTA Tour. In March, she reached the semifinal of the Mexican Open in Acapulco, but lost to Flavia Pennetta. In April, she reached the quarterfinals of the Morocco Open, where she also defeated former world No. 2, Svetlana Kuznetsova. In July, she reached another WTA Tour semifinal at the Palermo Ladies Open, losing to Sara Errani in straight sets. Despite falling early at the US Open, she made her first top-10 win, defeating world No. 9, Caroline Wozniacki, in the first round. In the following round, she lost to Sílvia Soler Espinosa. She did even better in September, when she won her first WTA Tour title, defeating Donna Vekić in the final. There, she also defeated top-50 players Alizé Cornet and Urszula Radwańska. She followed this with semifinal of the Linz Open, where Victoria Azarenka defeated her.

==== Doubles ====
Begu started year of 2011 well, winning title at the 100k tournament in Cali, as her first doubles tournament of the year. In June 2011, she won another 100k title in Marseille. At the 2011 Wimbledon Championships, she made her Grand Slam doubles debut, but lost in the first round. In July 2011, she won her year-third 100k title in Bucharest. She started year with the title at the Hobart International, her first WTA Tour doubles title, partnered with Monica Niculescu. She followed this with quarterfinal of the Australian Open, again with Niculescu. Then, in April, she reached the final of the Morocco Open, but finished runners-up with Alexandra Cadanțu. In July, she won the 100k Bucharest event for the second year in-a-row. Begu finished year reaching the final at the Luxembourg Open. During these two seasons, she debuted in the top 100 in February 2011, then in the top 50 in late January 2012.

=== 2013–14: From fall to improvement ===
==== Singles ====
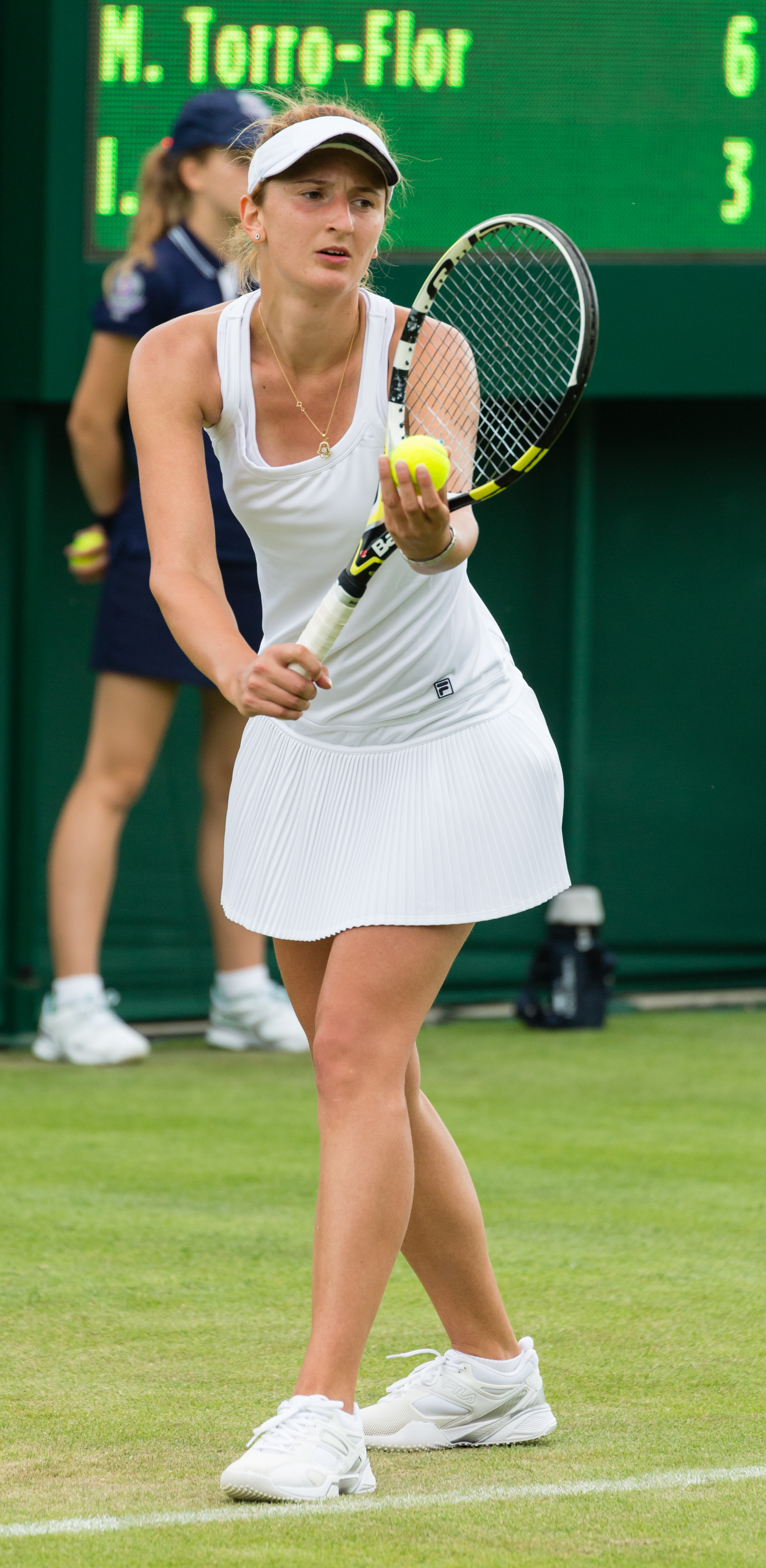
Begu at the 2013 Wimbledon Championships

Unlike previous years, Begu did not made any progress during the season of 2013. She started year with first round loss at the Hobart International. After that, she reached only first or second round at every tournaments with the exception of the one quarterfinal at the Korea Open in September. There she defeated top 50 Julia Görges, but later lost to Anastasia Pavlyuchenkova. Weak results caused her dropping on the rankings and falling out the top 100 in the September.

Things got changed in the season of 2014. At the Australian Open, she was forced to play in the qualifications. She succeed to qualify, but then lost to Galina Voskoboeva. At her following participation, she reached quarterfinal of the Rio Open, losing there to Teliana Pereira. She then was successful at the ITF Women's Circuit. She won two 25k events and reached final of the 50k Open Medellín. Nearly after that, in May, she reached semifinal of the Portugal Open in Oeiras, defeating top 30 Kaia Kanepi and top 50 Kurumi Nara, before she lost to top 20 player Carla Suárez Navarro. In July, she won $100k Contrexéville Open, after defeating top-seeded Kaia Kanepi. She finished year with the final of Premier-level Kremlin Cup, but then lost to Anastasia Pavlyuchenkova. All these results, helped her to climbed from outside the top 120 to the top 50, at the end of the year.

==== Doubles: Three WTA Tour titles ====
Just like in singles, Begu did not show her best in doubles, during these two seasons. At the 2013 Australian Open, she reached third round, alongside Niculescu, failing to repeat previous year quarterfinal result. In June, she won title at the Rosmalen Championships, alongside Anabel Medina Garrigues. That was her first grass title. In February 2014, she won title at the Rio Open, alongside María Irigoyen. Soon after that, she returned at the ITF Women's Circuit, where she first won 25k event in São Paulo and then the 50k Open Medellín. When she returned to the WTA Tour, she did not do well, but later reached third round of the French Open. In July, she reached final of the $100k Contrexéville Open. In September, she reached semifinals at the Tashkent Open, followed with title at the Korea Open. Despite her inconsistent, she remained in the top 100 through whole 2013 and 2014 seasons.

=== 2015–17: Another three career titles, top 30 ===
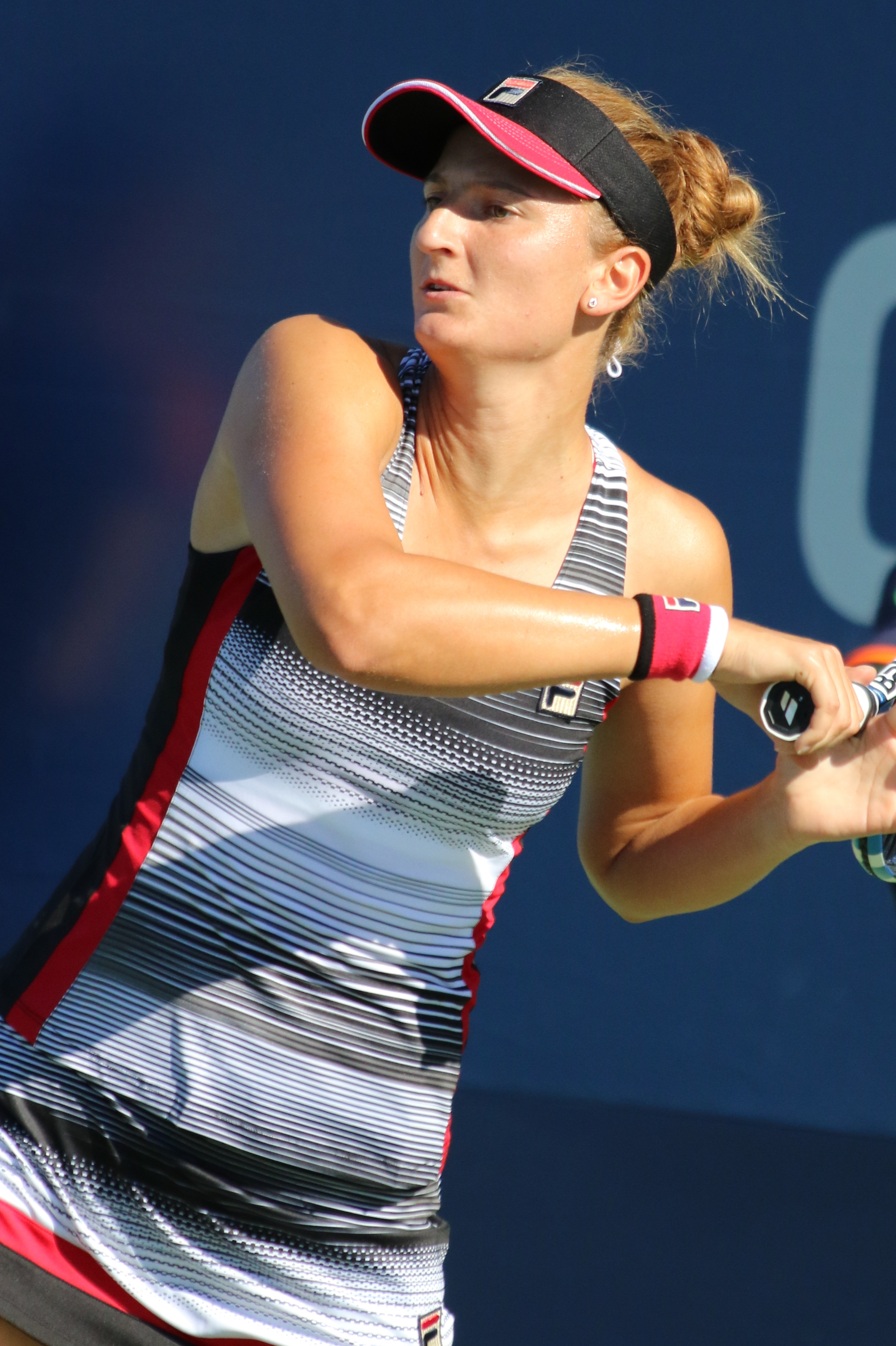
Begu at the 2016 US Open

==== Singles ====
Begu made big progress at the 2015 Australian Open. Until then, she had second round as her best Grand Slam result, but then she reached her first third round, and later round of 16. In the first round, she defeated top 10 Angelique Kerber, but later failed to reach her first Grand Slam quarterfinal, losing to world No. 7, Eugenie Bouchard. A month later, she reached the semifinal of the Rio Open, but lost to Anna Karolína Schmiedlová. She started well clay-season with quarterfinal of the Premier-level Charleston Open, where she was defeated by Angelique Kerber. At the Madrid Open, she reached her first Premier Mandatory quarterfinal, losing there to world No. 4, Petra Kvitová. She then reached third rounds at the Italian Open, French Open and Wimbledon. In September, she won WTA title at the Korea Open, defeating qualifier Aliaksandra Sasnovich in the final. In May, she debuted in the top 30 and later reached place of 25 as her then-highest ranking.

Despite having a slow start at the season of 2016, Begu reached round of 16 at the Miami Open. There she defeated top 40 Sabine Lisicki, before she later lost to Madison Keys. She followed this with quarterfinal of the Premier-level Charleston Open, losing to Angelique Kerber. She then made her second consecutive Madrid Open quarterfinal. She defeated world No. 4 Garbiñe Muguruza in the second round, but later lost to her compatriot, Simona Halep. She then reached her first Premier 5 semifinal at the Italian Open. There she made another top 10 win over Victoria Azarenka, but later lost to Serena Williams. At the French Open, she reached round of 16, after defeating two top 50 players, CoCo Vandeweghe and Annika Beck, before losing to Shelby Rogers. In August, she won title at the Brasil Tennis Cup by defeating Tímea Babos in the final. There she also defeated top 50 Monica Puig. Soon after that, also in August, she reached her career-highest singles ranking of place 22.

Until April 2017, Begu did not made any significant results since the start of the season. She then reached quarterfinal of the Premier-level Charleston Open, including win over top 20 Samantha Stosur, right before she later lost to Daria Kasatkina. She followed this with semifinal of the Istanbul Cup, but then lost to Elise Mertens. At the Madrid Open, she reached third round and also defeated top 20 Elena Vesnina in the first round. In July, she reached final of the $100k Southsea Trophy, but then lost to Tatjana Maria. Nearly after that, she won title at the Bucharest Open, defeating top 50 Julia Görges in the final and not losing a single set in the entire tournament. In the semifinal, she defeated top 40 Carla Suárez Navarro. She then did not do well, but in October, she reached semifinal of the Premier-level Kremlin Cup, where she was defeated by Daria Kasatkina. Previously, in the second round, she defeated top 30 Anastasija Sevastova. Through whole of the year, she stayed in the top 70.

==== Doubles ====
In February 2015, Begu finished runner-up alongside Maria Irigoyen at the Rio Open. At the Madrid Open, she reached her first Premier Mandatory quarterfinal. At the Canadian Open, she reached first Premier 5 quarterfinal, and then at the 2015 Wuhan Open, alongside Monica Niculescu, she reached her first final from that level. They lost to Martina Hingis and Sania Mirza. She finished season with the final of the Premier-level Kremlin Cup. Right after that, she debuted in the top 30. The following year, she continued with significant performances at the Premier 5-level, reaching semifinal at the 2016 Italian Open. However, her other results during the season of 2016 was not such significant. She started year inside top 30, then start dropping at the rankings and finished year outside the top 150. In 2017, she first got recognised at the Madrid Open, where she reached semifinal alongside Simona Halep. She followed this with her first 2017 French Open quarterfinal alongside Zheng Saisai, where they lost to Ashleigh Barty and Casey Dellacqua. In July 2017, alongside Raluca Olaru, she won Bucharest Open, defeating Elise Mertens and Demi Schuurs in the final. Then, again with Olaru, she reached quarterfinal of the Cincinnati Open. At the 2017 Tianjin Open, she won title alongside Sara Errani. Unlike in 2016, she start climbing in the rankings and returned to the top 40 in October.

=== 2018–20 ===
==== Singles ====
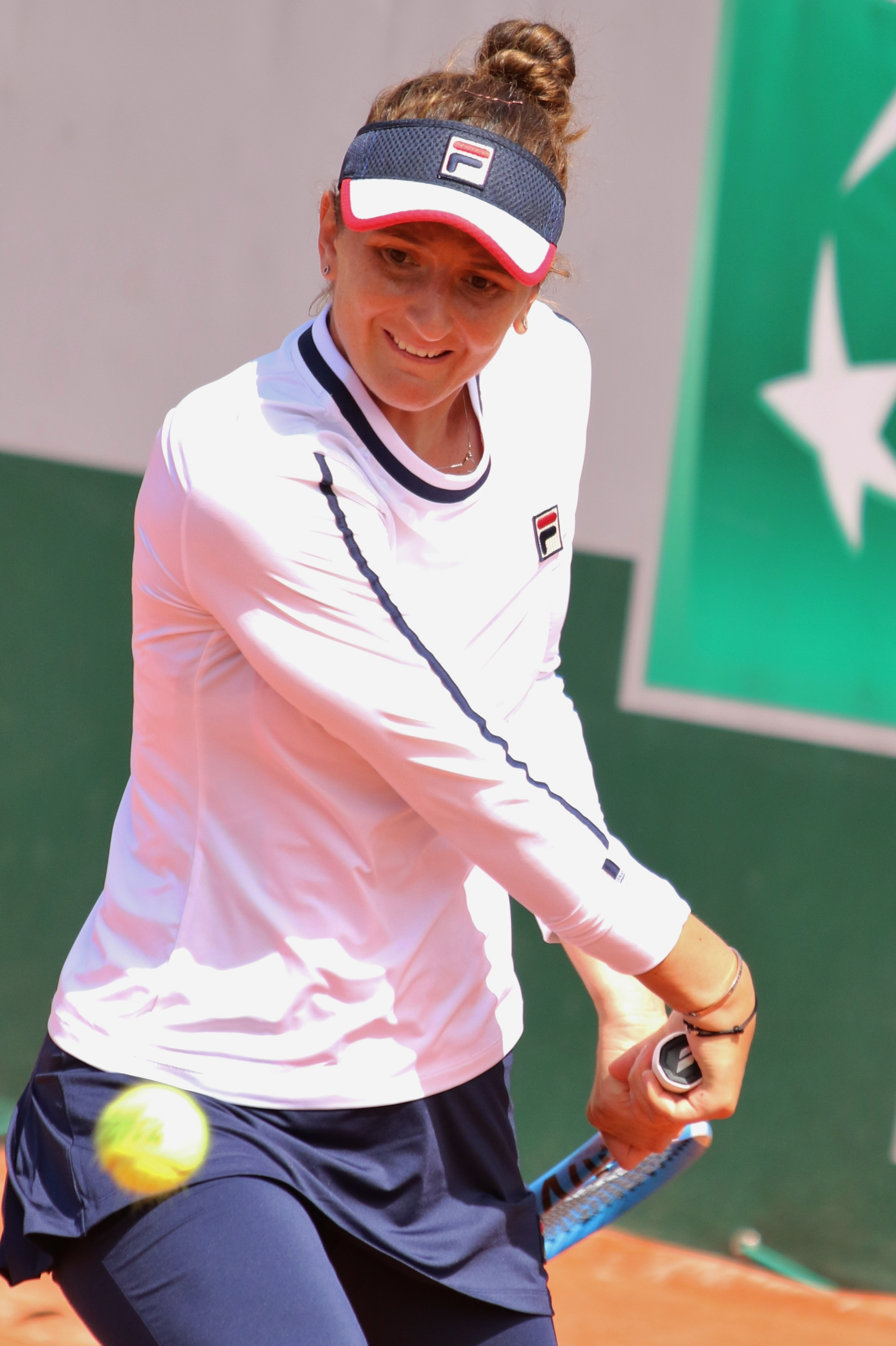
Begu at the 2019 French Open

Begu had variable results during these three seasons. She started season of 2018 with semifinal of the Shenzhen Open, but then lost to world No. 1 Simona Halep. She then start reaching only first or second rounds, before she reached quarterfinal of the Premier-level Charleston Open in April. There she lost to Daria Kasatkina. Nearly after that she reached semifinal of the Istanbul Cup. At the Madrid Open, she defeated world No. 5 Jeļena Ostapenko in the first round, but then lost to Maria Sharapova. At the French Open, she reached third round, after defeating top 30 Zhang Shuai. In the third-round match, she was defeated by world No. 7, Caroline Garcia. She then start not doing well, but reached quarterfinals of the Korea Open in September by defeating Agnieszka Radwańska.

In the early 2019, she reached quarterfinals of the Hobart International, but then lost to Anna Karolína Schmiedlová. A month later, she reached another quarterfinal at the Hungarian Open, losing there to Markéta Vondroušová. In May, she fall out the top 100 for the first time since April 2014. Later she reached quarterfinals at the Bucharest Open, where Laura Siegemund defeated her. Her last tournament of year was the $100k Kiskút Open, where she finished a runner-up, after losing to Danka Kovinić.

Begu won the $100k Cairo Open in February 2020 defeating Lesia Tsurenko in the final. This brought her back to the top 100. She continued her good form in March and won a title on the WTA 125 Indian Wells Challenger. She did not lose a set in the entire tournament and defeated Misaki Doi in the final. In August, she reached semifinals at the Prague Open, but then lost to compatriot Simona Halep. In the first round, she defeated top 50 player Anastasija Sevastova.

==== Doubles ====
Begu started season of 2018 with a title at the Shenzhen Open, alongside Simona Halep. She done even better at the Australian Open, where she reached her first major semifinal, playing along Monica Niculescu. However, they lost to Ekaterina Makarova and Elena Vesnina. In late June, she reached the final of the Eastbourne International, but failed to win the title. At Wimbledon alongside Mihaela Buzărnescu, she lost in the quarterfinals to Nicole Melichar and Květa Peschke. She followed this up winning the title at the Bucharest Open with Andreea Mitu. In September 2018, she reached the final of the Tashkent Open with Raluca Olaru, but they lost to Olga Danilović and Tamara Zidanšek. In October 2018, she reached her career-high doubles ranking of 22. In February 2019, she and Niculescu won the title at the Thailand Open, beating Anna Blinkova and Wang Yafan in the final. Later, she struggled with results and dropped out of the top 100 in late January 2020. During the season of 2020, Begu won only one match, that was at the Linz Open.

=== 2021: Major doubles semifinal ===
She reached the semifinals with local favorite Sara Errani as a wildcard pair at the Italian Open, where they were defeated by Markéta Vondroušová and Kristina Mladenovic. At the French Open, Begu reached the semifinals in doubles, partnering with Argentinian Nadia Podoroska for the second time in her career. They lost to Iga Świątek and Bethanie Mattek-Sands.

=== 2022: Major fourth round, first title since 2017 ===
She played at the Melbourne Summer Set 2 in January. In the first round, she defeated Jessica Pegula, the top seed of the tournament. She lost in straight sets to Amanda Anisimova in the quarterfinals. Then she lost in the second round to Elise Mertens at the Australian Open.

The next tournament was in Saint Petersburg, where she defeated Zhang Shuai, sixth seed Petra Kvitová and Tereza Martincová in straight sets, but she lost to the top seed Maria Sakkari in the semifinals, after a three-hour match. She then lost her opening round matches in Dubai Championships, Qatar Ladies Open, and Indian Wells Open. At Miami, she defeated Hailey Baptiste in three sets and then went on to defeat top seed Aryna Sabalenka, in straight sets, before losing to Aliaksandra Sasnovich in the third round.

During the clay-court season, she reached the round of 16 in Charleston and qualified for the main draw in Madrid where she lost to Belinda Bencic. At the French Open, she defeated 30th seed Ekaterina Alexandrova in the second round and wildcard Léolia Jeanjean in the third to enter the second week of a major event for the first time since the 2016 French Open, where she lost to Jessica Pegula. Begu was fined $10,000 for an unsportsmanlike conduct, after she threw her racket in her third-round match against Ekaterina Alexandrova. At Wimbledon, Begu lost in the third round to Jeļena Ostapenko, in three sets.

At the Palermo Ladies Open, Begu beat qualifier Marina Bassols Ribera, along with Océane Dodin, Diane Parry, Sara Sorribes Tormo, and Lucia Bronzetti, to win her first title in five years.

In September, she won the WTA 125 2022 Țiriac Foundation Trophy, defeating Réka Luca Jani in the final.

=== 2023–2024: First WTA 1000 quarterfinal since 2016, Romanian No. 1 ===
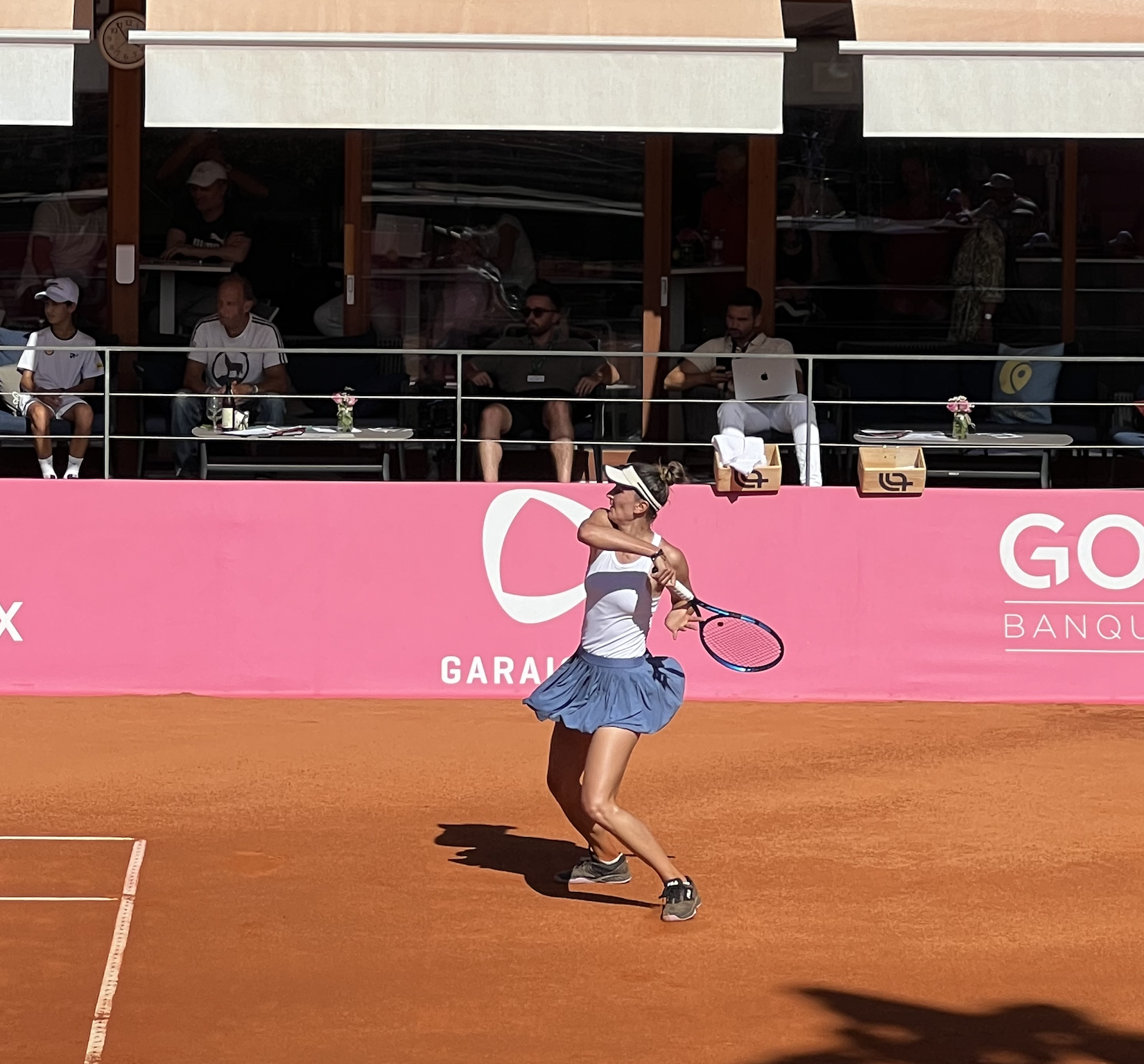
Begu hits a forehand in her semifinal at the 2024 Montreux Open.

At the 2023 Miami Open, she reached the second round saving five set points against Alexandra Eala. She lost to 23rd seed Zheng Qinwen. At the same tournament she reached the quarterfinals in doubles with Anhelina Kalinina as an alternate pair.

Seeded 31st at the 2023 Madrid Open, she reached the quarterfinals for the third time at this tournament, defeating Karolína Muchová, 33rd seed Shelby Rogers and 14th seed Liudmila Samsonova, before losing to ninth seed Maria Sakkari. As a result, she became the Romanian No. 1 female player ahead of Simona Halep, at world No. 27, on 8 May 2023.

A year later, when she entered the Madrid Open ranked No. 128 using protected ranking, after a six months hiatus from the WTA Tour, she defeated wildcard Linda Fruhvirtová in the first round, going out in round two against 18th seed Madison Keys Also using protected ranking at the next WTA 1000, the 2024 Italian Open, Begu reached the fourth round with wins over qualifier Rebeka Masarova, lucky loser Océane Dodin by retirement and 27th seed Elise Mertens, in straight sets, before losing to 13th seed Danielle Collins.

At the 2024 French Open, she overcame qualifier Julia Riera and 27th seed Linda Nosková. Her run was ended in the third round by Varvara Gracheva.

Begu won the 2024 Montreux Open, defeating Petra Marčinko in the final.

At the China Open, she recorded a first-round win over wildcard Ma Ye-Xin, before losing her next match to 17th seed Mirra Andreeva As a result, she returned to the top 100 in the WTA singles rankings.

Wins over wildcard Lucciana Pérez Alarcón, Emiliana Arango, eighth seed Anca Todoni and qualifier Tina Smith saw Begu reach the final at the 2024 WTA 125 Cali Open, where she defeated Veronika Erjavec to take the title.

== National representation ==
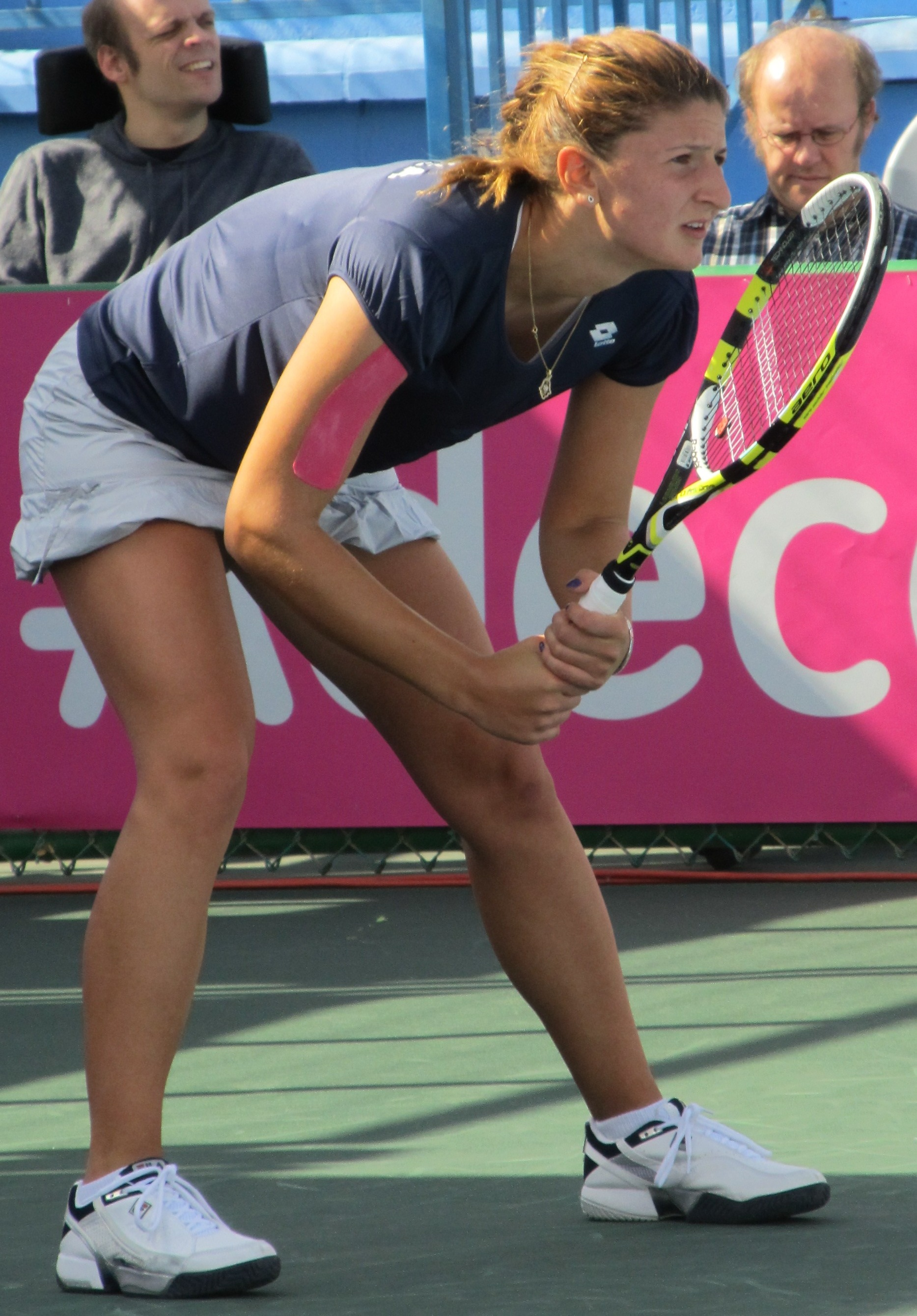
Begu at the 2012 Fed Cup

=== Olympics ===
Begu competed at the London Olympics in the women's singles, but lost in the first round to Victoria Azarenka. At the 2016 Summer Olympics in Rio, she competed in the women's singles (losing in the first round to Nao Hibino), the women's doubles (with Monica Niculescu, they lost in the first round) and the mixed doubles (with Horia Tecău, reaching the quarterfinals). Partnering Monica Niculescu, Begu represented Romania at the Paris Olympics, losing in the first round to Taiwanese pairing Hsieh Su-wei and Tsao Chia-yi.

== Career statistics ==
=== Grand Slam performance timelines ===
Key
W	F	SF	QF	#R	RR	Q#	P#	DNQ	A	Z#	PO	G	S	B	NMS	NTI	P	NH

(W) winner; (F) finalist; (SF) semifinalist; (QF) quarterfinalist; (#R) rounds 4, 3, 2, 1; (RR) round-robin stage; (Q#) qualification round; (P#) preliminary round; (DNQ) did not qualify; (A) absent; (Z#) Davis/Fed Cup Zonal Group (with number indication) or (PO) play-off; (G) gold, (S) silver or (B) bronze Olympic/Paralympic medal; (NMS) not a Masters tournament; (NTI) not a Tier I tournament; (P) postponed; (NH) not held; (SR) strike rate (events won / competed); (W–L) win–loss record.
To avoid confusion and double counting, these charts are updated at the conclusion of a tournament or when the player's participation has ended.

==== Singles ====
Tournament	2009	2010	2011	2012	2013	2014	2015	2016	2017	2018	2019	2020	2021	2022	2023	2024	2025	2026	SR	W–L	Win %
Australian Open	A	A	Q3	1R	2R	1R	4R	1R	2R	2R	2R	1R	1R	2R	2R	A	1R	A	0 / 13	9–13	41%
French Open	Q3	A	2R	2R	1R	Q3	3R	4R	1R	3R	3R	2R	1R	4R	3R	3R	1R	Q2	0 / 14	19–14	58%
Wimbledon	Q2	Q1	1R	1R	1R	2R	3R	1R	2R	1R	Q2	NH	3R	3R	2R	1R	2R	1R	0 / 14	10–14	42%
US Open	Q1	A	1R	2R	1R	2R	1R	1R	1R	2R	Q2	1R	1R	2R	1R	A	A	A	0 / 12	4–12	25%
Win–loss	0–0	0–0	1–3	2–4	1–4	2–3	7–4	3–4	2–4	4–4	3–2	1–3	2–4	7–4	4–4	2–2	1–3	0–1	0 / 53	42–53	44%

==== Doubles ====
Tournament	2011	2012	2013	2014	2015	2016	2017	2018	2019	2020	2021	2022	2023	SR	W–L
Australian Open	A	QF	3R	1R	2R	1R	1R	SF	2R	1R	1R	1R	1R	0 / 12	11–12
French Open	A	1R	2R	3R	2R	A	QF	2R	1R	1R	SF	2R	1R	0 / 11	13–11
Wimbledon	1R	2R	1R	1R	2R	1R	A	QF	3R	NH	A	1R	2R	0 / 10	8–10
US Open	2R	1R	1R	1R	3R	1R	1R	2R	A	A	2R	1R	1R	0 / 11	5–11
Win–loss	1–2	4–4	3–4	2–4	5–4	0–3	3–3	9–4	3–3	0–2	5–3	1–4	1–4	0 / 44	37–44

== Awards ==
2011

- WTA Newcomer of the Year

Awards
Preceded by (Czech Republic) Petra Kvitová	WTA Newcomer of the Year; 2011	Succeeded by (United Kingdom) Laura Robson
