= Bojana Bobusic =

Australian tennis player (born 1987)

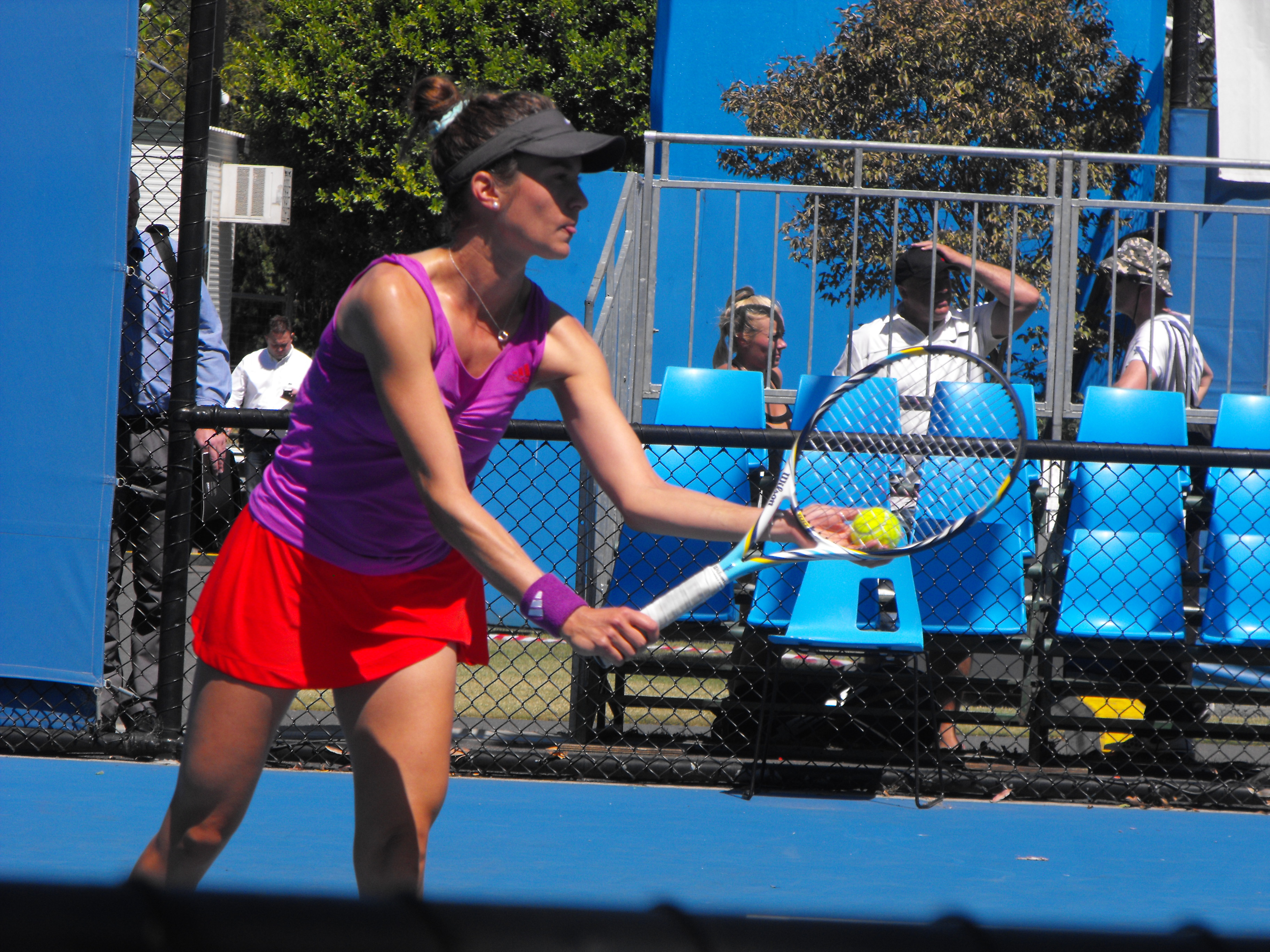
- At the 2012 Australian Open Wildcard Playoff
- Country (sports): Australia
- Residence: Perth, Western Australia
- Born: 2 October 1987 (age 37); Belgrade, SFR Yugoslavia
- Height: 1.70 m (5 ft 7 in)
- Turned pro: 2009
- Retired: 2014
- Plays: Right-handed (two-handed backhand)
- Prize money: $127,959

Singles
- Career record: 100–74
- Career titles: 1 ITF
- Highest ranking: No. 222 (17 September 2012)

Grand Slam singles results
- Australian Open: 1R (2012, 2013)

Doubles
- Career record: 64–63
- Career titles: 3 ITF
- Highest ranking: No. 187 (14 January 2013)

Grand Slam doubles results
- Australian Open: 2R (2012)

Bojana Bobusic (Serbian Cyrillic: Бојана Бобушић, Bojana Bobušić; born 2 October 1987) is a former professional Australian tennis player. On 20 February 2012, she reached her highest WTA singles ranking of 222. In her career, she won one singles title and three doubles titles on the ITF Women's Circuit. She was coached by Rohan Fisher.

== Career ==
=== 2004 ===
Bobusic made her senior debut at the Australian Open losing to American Jennifer Hopkins in the first round of qualifying. She played on the ITF Junior Circuit for the rest of the year, with her highlight coming at Wimbledon where she defeated former world No. 1, Caroline Wozniacki, 1–6, 6–2, 10–8.

=== 2005 ===
In 2005, Bobusic played at ITF events in New Zealand, Australia, Indonesia and Thailand before she attended the University of California, Berkeley, majoring in Sociology. She graduated in 2009.

=== 2009 ===
Bobusic returned to Australia and competed in ITF events, losing to Sacha Jones in her first four events. She reached the final in Darwin and lost in the semifinals in Port Pirie. She ended the year ranked 441.

=== 2010 ===
Starting the year at ITF events in Australia and Korea, Bobusic played ITF events in America in June and July, but only won one of the six matches she competed in. She returned to Australia and entered seven ITF events, only winning two main-draw matches, both in Alice Springs. She finished 2010 with a win–loss record of 10–17, and dropped to 596 in the WTA rankings.

=== 2011 ===
Started the year by qualifying for five consecutive $25k events in Australia, winning a main draw match in Mildura and reaching the quarterfinals in Bundaberg. Bobusic travelled to America again, and reached her second and third ITF finals at Landisville and Hilton Head Island. She then played in three events in Great Britain and lost in her fourth career ITF final at Chiswick to Donna Vekić, in three sets. She returned to Australia and had a successful end to the year, reaching two $25k semifinals, losing her fifth ITF final to Olivia Rogowska and winning her first ITF title in her sixth final at the $25k event in Mount Gambier against Korean Han Sung-hee. She received direct entry into Tennis Australia's annual Australian Open Wildcard Playoff, where she defeated Viktorija Rajicic and Sally Peers and was beaten by Storm Sanders in the round-robin stage. In her semifinal match, Bobusic lost to defending champion Rogowska. She finished 2011 ranked 294, the highest year-end ranking of her career.

=== 2012 ===
Bobusic benefited from her career-best season in 2011 by receiving qualifying wildcards into the Brisbane International and Hobart International. In her WTA Tour debut, Bobusic faced Russian Nina Bratchikova and lost 1–6, 6–7. Against Heather Watson in Hobart, her first ever top 100 opponent, Bobusic lost a close match 6–3, 3–6, 5–7. Her first main-draw appearance in a major ended at the Australian Open with a 1–6, 3–6 loss to 30th seed Angelique Kerber.

Following the Australian season, Bobusic didn't play for four months due to plantar fasciitis. She returned to the ITF Circuit in June 2012, achieving mixed results for the remainder of the year. Her final tournament in 2012 was the Australian Open Wildcard Playoff tournament, which she won, defeating three higher-ranked opponents including second seed Ashleigh Barty, fourth seed Arina Rodionova and third seed Monique Adamczak. The tournament win secured Bobusic a wildcard in the 2013 Australian Open.

=== 2013 ===
Her win in the Wildcard Playoff helped Bobusic to gain a wildcard into the qualifying draw at the Brisbane International. It was only the third time she had played in a WTA Tour tournament. She drew fellow wildcard recipient Arina Rodionova in the first round of qualifying and won in three sets. In the second round she defeated Karin Knapp of Italy in a match lasting over three hours. She then defeated sixth seeded Kristýna Plíšková in three sets to qualify for the main draw of a WTA tournament for the first time. She drew world No. 44, Alizé Cornet, in the first round and lost in three sets.

Bobusic's strong performance in Brisbane help her to gain a wildcard to the main draw of the Hobart International where she lost a tight match to qualifier Lauren Davis, in the first round in three sets. In Hobart, she reached her first WTA doubles semifinal, partnering Ashleigh Barty.

Bobusic received a difficult challenge at the Australian Open, drawing fourth seed Agnieszka Radwańska. Bobusic played well above her ranking and served for the first set, before losing in straight sets.

=== Retirement ===
She announced retirement because of chronic back and foot injuries. Her last match was at the Hopman Cup (3 January 2014) where she competed together with Oliver Anderson, they were replacing players from the United States team – Sloane Stephens and John Isner. She has moved on to tennis and physical education teaching at Applecross Senior High School.

== ITF Circuit finals ==
Legend
$50,000 tournaments
$25,000 tournaments
$10,000 tournaments

=== Singles: 6 (1–5) ===
Result	No.	Date	Tournament	Tier	Surface	Opponent	Score
Loss	1.	21 September 2009	Darwin, Australia	25,000	Hard	(Australia) Sacha Jones	4–6, 1–6
Loss	2.	17 May 2011	Landisville, United States	10,000	Hard	(United States) Robin Anderson	2–6, 3–6
Loss	3.	31 May 2011	Hilton Head, United States	10,000	Hard	(United States) Alexandra Mueller	2–6, 0–6
Loss	4.	27 July 2011	Chiswick, United Kingdom	10,000	Hard	(Croatia) Donna Vekić	6–3, 3–6, 3–6
Loss	5.	25 October 2011	Port Pirie, Australia	25,000	Hard	(Australia) Olivia Rogowska	3–6, 2–6
Win	6.	1 November 2011	Mount Gambier, Australia	25,000	Hard	(South Korea) Han Sung-hee	6–3, 6–2

=== Doubles: 8 (3–5) ===
Result	No.	Date	Tournament	Tier	Surface	Partner	Opponents	Score
Loss	1.	16 October 2009	Port Pirie, Australia	25,000	Hard	(Australia) Alenka Hubacek	(Japan) Erika Sema (Japan) Yurika Sema	1–6, 7–5, [6–10]
Win	2.	25 July 2010	Lexington, United States	50,000	Hard	(United States) Christina Fusano	(United States) Jacqueline Cako (United States) Story Tweedie-Yates	6–4, 6–2
Win	3.	5 October 2010	Port Pirie, Australia	25,000	Hard	(Australia) Alenka Hubacek	(United Kingdom) Melanie South (Japan) Remi Tezuka	6–3, 6–3
Win	4.	23 May 2011	Sumter, United States	10,000	Hard	(United Kingdom) Nicola Slater	(Australia) Ebony Panoho (Australia) Storm Sanders	4–6, 7–5, [10–6]
Loss	5.	24 October 2011	Port Pirie, Australia	25,000	Hard	(Australia) Monique Adamczak	(Australia) Isabella Holland (Australia) Sally Peers	w/o
Loss	6.	14 November 2011	Traralgon, Australia	25,000	Hard	(Australia) Monique Adamczak	(Australia) Stephanie Bengson (Australia) Tyra Calderwood	7–6, 1–6, [8–10]
Loss	7.	28 January 2013	Burnie, Australia	25,000	Hard	(Australia) Jessica Moore	(Japan) Shuko Aoyama (Japan) Erika Sema	w/o
Loss	8.	18 February 2013	Mildura, Australia	25,000	Grass	(United Kingdom) Emily Webley-Smith	(Russia) Ksenia Lykina (Japan) Yurika Sema	4–6, 2–6

== Grand Slam performance timelines ==
Key
W	F	SF	QF	#R	RR	Q#	DNQ	A	NH

(W) winner; (F) finalist; (SF) semifinalist; (QF) quarterfinalist; (#R) rounds 4, 3, 2, 1; (RR) round-robin stage; (Q#) qualification round; (DNQ) did not qualify; (A) absent; (NH) not held; (SR) strike rate (events won / competed); (W–L) win–loss record.

=== Singles ===
Tournament	2012	2013	W–L
Australian Open	1R	1R	0–2
French Open	–	–	0–0
Wimbledon	–	–	0–0
US Open	–	–	0–0
Overall win–loss	0–1	0–1	0–2

=== Doubles ===
Tournament	2012	2013	W–L
Australian Open	2R	1R	1–2
French Open	–	–	0–0
Wimbledon	–	–	0–0
US Open	–	–	0–0
Overall win–loss	1–1	0–1	1–2
