= Sacha Hughes =

Australian-New Zealander tennis player

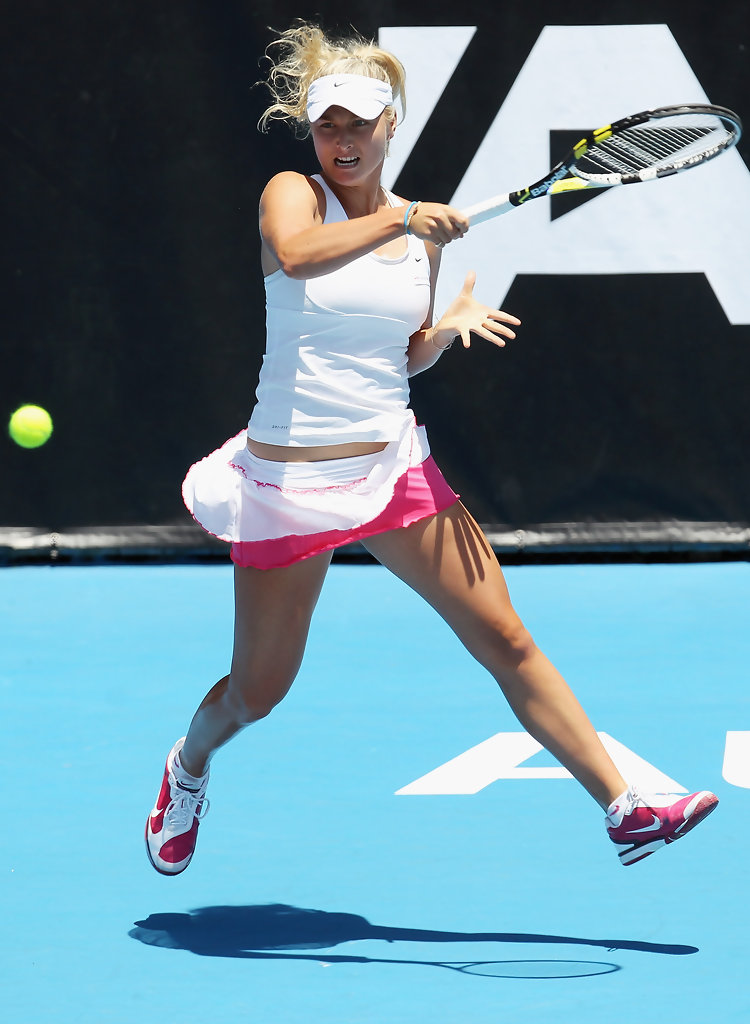
- Sacha Hughes at the ASB Classic in Auckland in 2014.
- Country (sports): Australia (2012–2018); New Zealand (2005–2012)
- Residence: Auckland, New Zealand
- Born: 8 November 1990 (age 36) Auckland
- Height: 1.74 m (5 ft 9 in)
- Turned pro: 2008
- Retired: 2018
- Plays: Right-handed (two-handed backhand)
- Prize money: $193,622

Singles
- Career record: 212–119
- Career titles: 10 ITF
- Highest ranking: No. 150 (8 October 2012)

Grand Slam singles results
- Australian Open: 1R (2013)
- French Open: Q1 (2011, 2012)
- Wimbledon: Q2 (2011, 2013)
- US Open: Q2 (2011)

Doubles
- Career record: 35–37
- Career titles: 2 ITF
- Highest ranking: No. 169 (29 October 2012)

Grand Slam doubles results
- Australian Open: 2R (2012)

Sacha Hughes (née Jones; born 8 November 1990) is the current New Zealand Fed Cup captain, appointed May 2019. She is a former professional New Zealand and Australian tennis player who competed as Sacha Jones. Her highest WTA singles ranking is 150, which she reached on 8 October 2012. Her highest ITF junior ranking is 11 in the world. She attained the No. 1 ranking in New Zealand in 2009 and competed in the ASB Classic, New Zealand's only WTA event, on seven occasions.

== Personal life ==
Her father is Australian-born and her mother is a New Zealander. She has two older brothers and one older sister.

In 2014, Jones retired from professional tennis citing a succession of injuries including three stress fractures in her ribs. Upon retiring from professional tennis she completed her private pilots license.

In 2016, she co-founded a website called RealYou, with her friend Stephanie Hughes, which seeks to encourage young women to grow their inner confidence, and offers personal support for the challenges that teenagers experience. Praised for openly discussing topics such as depression and body image, Hughes talks openly about her own experiences with such subjects.

As at 2023, she lives in Noosa, Queensland.

== Tennis career ==
=== 2003–2008 ===
In 2003, Jones became the youngest person, female or male, to win the New Zealand 18&under National Championships at 13 years, one month. She defeated Lucy Cole in the final, 6–0, 6–1.

Jones began 2005 ranked outside the top 500 juniors in the world and finished inside the top 75 thanks to winning three tournaments in a row, including the Oceania Junior Championships held in Lautoka, Fiji.

In 2006, she competed in all four Junior Grand Slam tournaments. She lost in the second round of the Australian Open to Dominika Cibulková, second round of junior Wimbledon to Caroline Wozniacki and the quarterfinals of the US Open to Tamira Paszek. At 16 years old, she finished 2006 ranked 11 in the world junior 18&under ITF rankings.

As a 17-year-old, Jones lost in round one of the 2008 ASB Classic to second seed, Vera Zvonareva. Later in the year, Jones teamed up with Justin Gimelstob and Serena Williams to play for the Washington Kastles World TeamTennis team.

=== 2009 ===
Sacha began 2009 ranked 306 in the world. In June, she won her first professional tournament in Texas. In September she embarked on a 24 match winning streak. At a tournament in Darwin, Jones won her second title of the year, recording a win over former top-10 player Alicia Molik who was working on a comeback. Two weeks later, she won another title in Mount Gambier, defeating Molik in the final. The next week, Jones' run continued in Port Pirie, where she again defeated Molik in the final. Jones then traveled to Rock Hill, South Carolina where she won another tournament without dropping a set. The following week, Jones again raced to another final in Phoenix, Arizona but had her run snapped by Varvara Lepchenko. After this run of good form, she was ranked at a career high of 167 in the world.

=== 2010–2011 ===
Jones was set to compete in the Auckland Open but had to withdraw due to an abdominal injury.

She played at the Pattaya Open but lost in the first round to Alberta Brianti. She was able to compete only sporadically on tour for the remainder of the year due to stress fractures in her ribs.

Jones featured in the 2011 Auckland Open as a wildcard draw in which she was defeated in two tight sets by third seed Svetlana Kuznetsova in the first round. She was the hitting partner for Maria Sharapova during this tournament. She also competed in the US Open qualifying draw, losing in the second round in three sets.

=== 2012 ===
Jones started off at the Auckland Open as a wildcard where she lost her first-round match to Elena Baltacha, in three tight sets. She qualified for the Hobart International and won her first round at the WTA event- beating Kristina Barrois in straight sets. She lost to Shahar Pe'er in round two in an extremely tight two-setter.

At the Australian Open, Sacha partnered compatriot Bojana Bobusic to enter the women's doubles draw where the pair beat Līga Dekmeijere and Maria Kondratieva in the first round. This was her first ever win at a main draw of a Grand Slam tournament.

She recorded mixed results for most of 2012 including a three set win over Eugenie Bouchard to secure her spot in the French Open. At the Gastein Ladies, Jones won her second WTA Tour main-draw match, defeating Yuliya Beygelzimer in round one. She lost to Alizé Cornet in round two.

During the year, she secured three $25k victories on the ITF Circuit, including one title in Kristenhamm, Sweden and two in Australia.

=== 2013–2014 ===
Jones made her Grand Slam singles debut at the Australian Open; she was beaten in the first round by Kristýna Plíšková. In 2013, she suffered from chronic fatigue syndrome and stress fractures in her shin, and played a limited schedule.

Jones lost at the 2014 Auckland Open to Sachie Ishizu 6–7 in the third set, after holding several match points. Partnering with her best childhood friend in the doubles event at Auckland, they beat the top seeds, former world No. 1, Cara Black and New Zealand's Marina Erakovic, in the opening round. She announced that the Auckland Open was her last tournament, and retired from professional tennis. Later in 2014, she won the New Zealand Women's Open in singles and in doubles.

=== 2018: Short comeback ===
Jones started her comeback at the Auckland Open, where she lost in the first round of qualifying to Katie Boulter.

== ITF Circuit finals ==
Legend
$100,000 tournaments
$75,000 tournaments
$50,000 tournaments
$25,000 tournaments
$10,000 tournaments

=== Singles: 15 (10 titles, 5 runner–ups) ===
Result	W–L	Date	Tournament	Tier	Surface	Opponent	Score
Loss	0–1	Nov 2008	ITF Manila, Philippines	10,000	Hard	(Indonesia) Ayu Fani Damayanti	6–7^{(5–7)}, 2–6
Win	1–1	Jun 2009	ITF Brownsville, United States	10,000	Hard	(United States) Ester Goldfeld	6–3, 2–6, 6–0
Win	2–1	Sep 2009	ITF Darwin, Australia	25,000	Hard	(Australia) Bojana Bobusic	6–4, 6–1
Win	3–1	Oct 2009	ITF Mount Gambier, Australia	25,000	Hard	(Australia) Alicia Molik	4–6, 6–4, 6–3
Win	4–1	Oct 2009	ITF Port Pirie, Australia	25,000	Hard	(Australia) Alicia Molik	3–6, 6–1, 7–5
Win	5–1	Nov 2009	ITF Rock Hill, United States	25,000	Hard	(Croatia) Ani Mijačika	6–0, 6–4
Loss	5–2	Nov 2009	ITF Phoenix, United States	50,000	Hard	(United States) Varvara Lepchenko	0–6, 0–6
Win	6–2	Sep 2010	ITF Alice Springs, Australia	25,000	Hard	(Brazil) Ana Clara Duarte	5–7, 6–3, 6–3
Win	7–2	Nov 2010	ITF Esperance, Australia	25,000	Hard	(Turkey) Çağla Büyükakçay	6–2, 6–3
Loss	7–3	Nov 2010	ITF Traralgon, Australia	25,000	Hard	(Israel) Julia Glushko	6–2, 5–7, 6–7^{(4–7)}
Loss	7–4	Nov 2011	ITF Traralgon, Australia	25,000	Hard	(Australia) Casey Dellacqua	5–7, 6–7^{(6–8)}
Win	8–4	Jun 2012	ITF Kristinehamn, Sweden	25,000	Clay	(Poland) Magda Linette	6–4, 6–4
Win	9–4	Sep 2012	ITF Cairns, Australia	25,000	Hard	(Hong Kong) Zhang Ling	6–0, 6–2
Loss	9–5	Sep 2012	ITF Traralgon, Australia	25,000	Hard	(Australia) Olivia Rogowska	6–0, 3–6, 2–6
Win	10–5	Sep 2012	ITF Traralgon, Australia	25,000	Hard	(Australia) Olivia Rogowska	6–2, 7–5

=== Doubles: 4 (2 titles, 2 runner-ups) ===
Result	W–L	Date	Tournament	Tier	Surface	Partner	Opponents	Score
Win	1–0	Jun 2009	ITF Brownsville, United States	10,000	Hard	(United States) Ashley Weinhold	(United States) Ester Goldfeld (United States) Macall Harkins	6–3, 6–3
Loss	1–1	Aug 2009	ITF Qianshan, China	10,000	Hard	(Australia) Alison Bai	(China) Liang Chen (China) Sun Shengnan	2–6, 4–6
Loss	1–2	Apr 2012	ITF Bundaberg, Australia	25,000	Clay	(Australia) Sally Peers	(Japan) Shuko Aoyama (Japan) Junri Namigata	1–6, 5–7
Win	2–2	Sep 2012	ITF Port Pirie, Australia	25,000	Hard	(Australia) Sally Peers	(Australia) Stephanie Bengson (South Africa) Chanel Simmonds	6–4, 6–2
