= 2013 Copa Bionaire =

- Date: 11–17 February
- Edition: 7th
- Category: WTA 125s
- Draw: 32S/16D
- Prize money: $125,000+H
- Surface: Clay
- Location: Cali, Colombia
- Venue: Club Campestre de Cali

Champions

Singles
- (Spain) Lara Arruabarrena

Doubles
- (Colombia) Catalina Castaño / (Colombia) Mariana Duque
← 2012 ·	Copa Bionaire	· 2023 →

The 2013 Copa Bionaire was a professional tennis tournament played on clay courts. It was the seventh edition of the tournament which was part of the 2013 WTA 125s. It took place in Cali, Colombia on 11–17 February 2013.

== Singles main draw entrants ==
=== Seeds ===
Country	Player	Rank^{1}	Seed
LUX	Mandy Minella	80	1
ESP	Lara Arruabarrena	81	2
ROU	Alexandra Cadanțu	94	3
RUS	Alexandra Panova	100	4
ESP	María Teresa Torró Flor	101	5
UKR	Elina Svitolina	104	6
RUS	Nina Bratchikova	106	7
GER	Tatjana Malek	110	8

- ^{1} Rankings as of 4 February 2013

=== Other entrants ===
The following players received wildcards into the singles main draw:

- (Brazil) Maria Fernanda Alves
- (Colombia) Catalina Castaño
- (Romania) Alexandra Dulgheru
- (Colombia) Yuliana Lizarazo

The following players received entry from the qualifying draw:

- (Spain) Inés Ferrer Suárez
- (Spain) Arantxa Parra Santonja
- (France) Laura Thorpe
- (Slovenia) Maša Zec Peškirič

The following player received entry into the singles main draw as a Lucky Loser:

- (Ukraine) Kateryna Kozlova

== Doubles main draw entrants ==
=== Seeds ===
Country	Player	Country	Player	Seed
CZE	Eva Birnerová	GER	Tatjana Malek	1
RUS	Nina Bratchikova	GEO	Oksana Kalashnikova	2
ESP	Inés Ferrer Suárez	ESP	Arantxa Parra Santonja	3
COL	Catalina Castaño	COL	Mariana Duque	4

== Champions ==
=== Singles ===
- (Spain) Lara Arruabarrena def. (Colombia) Catalina Castaño 6–3, 6–2

=== Doubles ===
- (Colombia) Catalina Castaño / (Colombia) Mariana Duque def. (Argentina) Florencia Molinero / (Brazil) Teliana Pereira 3–6, 6–1, [10–5]
