= 2024 Cali Open WTA 125 =

- Date: 4 – 9 November
- Edition: 9th
- Category: WTA 125
- Draw: 32S/16D
- Prize money: $115,000
- Surface: Clay
- Location: Cali, Colombia
- Venue: Club Campestre de Cali

Champions

Singles
- (Romania) Irina-Camelia Begu

Doubles
- (Slovenia) Veronika Erjavec / (France) Kristina Mladenovic
← 2023 ·	Copa Bionaire	· 2025 →

The 2024 Cali Open WTA 125 was a professional tennis tournament played on outdoor clay courts. It was the ninth edition of the tournament and part of the 2024 WTA 125 tournaments. It took place at the Club Campestre in Cali, Colombia between 4 and 9 November 2024.

== Champions ==
=== Singles ===
- (Romania) Irina-Camelia Begu def. (Slovenia) Veronika Erjavec 6–3, 6–3

=== Doubles ===
- (Slovenia) Veronika Erjavec / (France) Kristina Mladenovic def. (Croatia) Tara Würth / (Ukraine) Katarina Zavatska 6–2, 7–6^{(7–4)}

== Singles main draw entrants ==
=== Seeds ===
Country	Player	Rank^{1}	Seed
COL	Camila Osorio	64	1
ROU	Irina-Camelia Begu	102	2
USA	Robin Montgomery	107	3
FRA	Chloé Paquet	108	4
ARG	Julia Riera	117	5
BRA	Laura Pigossi	129	6
LAT	Darja Semeņistaja	131	7
ROU	Anca Todoni	138	8

- ^{1} Rankings as of 28 October 2024

=== Other entrants ===
The following players received wildcards into the singles main draw:

- (Colombia) Yuliana Lizarazo
- (Colombia) Valentina Mediorreal
- (Colombia) María Paulina Pérez
- (Peru) Lucciana Pérez Alarcón

The following players received entry from the qualifying draw:

- (Spain) Alicia Herrero Liñana
- Daria Kudashova
- (Slovakia) Martina Okáľová
- (Australia) Tina Smith

== Doubles main draw entrants ==
=== Seeds ===
Country	Player	Country	Player	Rank	Seed
SLO	Veronika Erjavec	FRA	Kristina Mladenovic	180	1
	Maria Kononova		Maria Kozyreva	360	2
ESP	Alicia Herrero Liñana	ARG	Melany Krywoj	387	3
ESP	Aliona Bolsova	UKR	Valeriya Strakhova	405	3

- ^{1} Rankings as of 28 October 2024

=== Other entrants ===
The following pair received a wildcard into the doubles main draw:

- (Colombia) Mariana Higuita / (Colombia) Valentina Mediorreal
