= 2024 Cali Open WTA 125 – Doubles =

Doubles
- 2024 Cali Open WTA 125

Final
- Champions: (Slovenia) Veronika Erjavec (France) Kristina Mladenovic
- Runners-up: (Croatia) Tara Würth (Ukraine) Katarina Zavatska
- Score: 6–2, 7–6^{(7–4)}

Events
Singles	Doubles
← 2023 ·	Copa Bionaire	· 2025 →

Weronika Falkowska and Katarzyna Kawa were the reigning champions, but Falkowska chose not to participate and Kawa chose to compete in Midland instead.

Veronika Erjavec and Kristina Mladenovic won the title, defeating Tara Würth and Katarina Zavatska 6–2, 7–6^{(7–4)} in the final. They did not drop a set throughout the tournament. It was Erjavec's third WTA 125 title and Mladenovic's second.

== Seeds ==
1. (Slovenia) Veronika Erjavec / (France) Kristina Mladenovic (champions)
2. Maria Kononova / Maria Kozyreva (semifinals)
3. (Spain) Alicia Herrero Liñana / (Argentina) Melany Krywoj (semifinals)
4. (Spain) Aliona Bolsova / (Ukraine) Valeriya Strakhova (quarterfinals)

== Draw ==
=== Key ===
- Q = Qualifier
- WC = Wild card
- LL = Lucky loser
- Alt = Alternate
- ITF = ITF entry
- PR = Protected ranking
- SR = Special ranking
- SE = Special exempt
- JE = Junior exempt
- JR = Junior Accelerator Programme entrant
- CO = College Accelerator Programme entrant
- NG = Next Gen Accelerator Program entrant
- w/o = Walkover
- r = Retired
- d = Defaulted

=== Draw ===
First round
WC	(Colombia) S Alba Verastegui (Colombia) M Sánchez Uribe	3	4
D Lodikova (Bolivia) N Zeballos	6	6
3	(Spain) A Herrero Liñana (Argentina) M Krywoj	3	6	[10]
(Slovakia) M Okáľová (Australia) T Smith	6	0	[3]
(Argentina) M Capurro Taborda (Colombia) Y Lizarazo	4	6^{1}
(Brazil) L Pigossi (Argentina) J Riera	6	7^{7}
(Colombia) Y Monroy (Colombia) M Torres Murcia	0	3
(Croatia) T Würth (Ukraine) K Zavatska	6	6
(Colombia) E Arango (Colombia) MP Pérez	5	6	[6]
4	(Spain) A Bolsova (Ukraine) V Strakhova	7	1	[10]
WC	(Colombia) M Higuita (Colombia) V Mediorreal	3	6	[7]
(Argentina) J Ortenzi (Peru) L Pérez Alarcón	6	3	[10]
(Italy) N Brancaccio (Spain) L Romero Gormaz	7	6^{2}	[6]
2	M Kononova; M Kozyreva	5	7^{7}	[10]

Quarterfinals
1	(Slovenia) V Erjavec (France) K Mladenovic	w/o
D Lodikova (Bolivia) N Zeballos
3	(Spain) A Herrero Liñana (Argentina) M Krywoj	w/o
(Brazil) L Pigossi (Argentina) J Riera
(Croatia) T Würth (Ukraine) K Zavatska	3	7^{7}	[10]
4	(Spain) A Bolsova (Ukraine) V Strakhova	6	6^{5}	[6]
(Argentina) J Ortenzi (Peru) L Pérez Alarcón	3	4
2	M Kononova; M Kozyreva	6	6

Semifinals
1	(Slovenia) V Erjavec (France) K Mladenovic	6	7^{7}
3	(Spain) A Herrero Liñana (Argentina) M Krywoj	4	6^{4}
(Croatia) T Würth (Ukraine) K Zavatska	6	3	[10]
2	M Kononova; M Kozyreva	3	6	[7]

Final
1	(Slovenia) V Erjavec (France) K Mladenovic	6	7^{7}
(Croatia) T Würth (Ukraine) K Zavatska	2	6^{4}
