= 2012 Copa Bionaire – Doubles =

Doubles
- 2012 Copa Bionaire

Final
- Champions: (Italy) Karin Knapp (Luxembourg) Mandy Minella
- Runners-up: (Romania) Alexandra Cadanțu (Romania) Raluca Olaru
- Score: 6–4, 6–3

Events
Singles	Doubles
← 2011 ·	Copa Bionaire	· 2013 →

Irina-Camelia Begu and Elena Bogdan were the defending champions, but both chose not to participate.

Karin Knapp and Mandy Minella won the tournament, defeating Alexandra Cadanțu and Raluca Olaru in the final, 6–4, 6–3.

== Seeds ==
1. (Romania) Alexandra Dulgheru / (Romania) Edina Gallovits-Hall (first round)
2. (Canada) Sharon Fichman / (China) Sun Shengnan (semifinals)
3. (Spain) Lourdes Domínguez Lino / (Spain) Inés Ferrer Suárez (first round)
4. (Romania) Alexandra Cadanțu / (Romania) Raluca Olaru (final)

== Draw ==
=== Key ===
- Q = Qualifier
- WC = Wild card
- LL = Lucky loser
- Alt = Alternate
- SE = Special exempt
- PR = Protected ranking
- ITF = ITF entry
- JE = Junior exempt
- w/o = Walkover
- r = Retired
- d = Defaulted
- SR = Special ranking

First round
1	(Romania) A Dulgheru (Romania) E Gallovits-Hall	6	6^{5}	[8]
(Colombia) K Castiblanco (Puerto Rico) M Puig	2	7^{7}	[10]
(Colombia) Y Lizarazo (United States) L Muma	4	3
(Italy) C Dentoni (Germany) K Wörle	6	6
4	(Romania) A Cadanțu (Romania) R Olaru	6	6
WC	(United States) N Robinson (Colombia) A Ternera	0	3
(Czech Republic) E Birnerová (Czech Republic) H Birnerová	4	1
(Colombia) C Castaño (Colombia) M Duque	6	6
(Italy) K Knapp (Luxembourg) M Minella	6	6
(Spain) L Arruabarrena (Spain) E Cabeza Candela	3	1
(Bulgaria) A Naydenova (Brazil) T Pereira	6	6
3	(Spain) L Domínguez Lino (Spain) I Ferrer Suárez	4	3
WC	(Colombia) MP Pérez (Colombia) PA Pérez	1	1
(Brazil) MF Alves (United States) T Luzhanska	6	6
(United States) J Cohen (Kazakhstan) S Karatantcheva	3	6^{2}
2	(Canada) S Fichman (China) S Sun	6	7^{7}

Quarterfinals
(Colombia) K Castiblanco (Puerto Rico) M Puig	7	6
(Italy) C Dentoni (Germany) K Wörle	5	4
4	(Romania) A Cadanțu (Romania) R Olaru	6	6^{3}	[10]
(Colombia) C Castaño (Colombia) M Duque	3	7^{7}	[6]
(Italy) K Knapp (Luxembourg) M Minella	1	6	[10]
(Bulgaria) A Naydenova (Brazil) T Pereira	6	3	[8]
(Brazil) MF Alves (United States) T Luzhanska	5	6	[10]
2	(Canada) S Fichman (China) S Sun	7	1	[12]

Semifinals
(Colombia) K Castiblanco (Puerto Rico) M Puig	2	1
4	(Romania) A Cadanțu (Romania) R Olaru	6	6
(Italy) K Knapp (Luxembourg) M Minella	6	6
2	(Canada) S Fichman (China) S Sun	2	2

Finals
4	(Romania) A Cadanțu (Romania) R Olaru	4	3
(Italy) K Knapp (Luxembourg) M Minella	6	6
