= 2024 Cali Open WTA 125 – Singles =

Singles
- 2024 Cali Open WTA 125

Final
- Champion: (Romania) Irina-Camelia Begu
- Runner-up: (Slovenia) Veronika Erjavec
- Score: 6–3, 6–3

Events
Singles	Doubles
← 2023 ·	Copa Bionaire	· 2025 →

Nadia Podoroska was the reigning champion, but did not participate this year.

Irina-Camelia Begu won the title, defeating Veronika Erjavec 6–3, 6–3 in the final. She did not drop a set throughout the tournament. This was Begu's fourth WTA 125 title and third of the year.

== Seeds ==
1. (Colombia) Camila Osorio (quarterfinals)
2. (Romania) Irina-Camelia Begu (champion)
3. (United States) Robin Montgomery (second round)
4. (France) Chloé Paquet (first round)
5. (Argentina) Julia Riera (first round)
6. (Brazil) Laura Pigossi (first round)
7. (Latvia) Darja Semeņistaja (second round)
8. (Romania) Anca Todoni (quarterfinals)

== Draw ==
Key

- Q = Qualifier
- WC = Wild card
- LL = Lucky loser
- Alt = Alternate
- ITF = ITF entry
- PR = Protected ranking
- SR = Special ranking
- SE = Special exempt
- JE = Junior exempt
- JR = Junior Accelerator Programme entrant
- CO = College Accelerator Programme entrant
- NG = Next Gen Accelerator Program entrant
- w/o = Walkover
- r = Retired
- d = Defaulted

=== Finals ===
Semifinals
(Hungary) Panna Udvardy	3	2
(Slovenia) Veronika Erjavec	6	6
Q	(Australia) Tina Smith	1	3
2	(Romania) Irina-Camelia Begu	6	6

Final
(Slovenia) Veronika Erjavec	3	3
2	(Romania) Irina-Camelia Begu	6	6

=== Top half ===
First round
1	(Colombia) C Osorio	6	7
(Argentina) M Capurro Taborda	2	5
(France) K Mladenovic	4	3
(Italy) N Brancaccio	6	6
(Ukraine) K Zavatska	2	0
(Hungary) P Udvardy	6	6
(Croatia) T Würth	6^{3}	6^{4}
7	(Latvia) D Semeņistaja	7^{7}	7^{7}
4	(France) C Paquet	2	2
(Slovenia) V Erjavec	6	6
(United Kingdom) F Jones	6	7^{7}
(Romania) M Bulgaru	4	6^{3}
WC	(Colombia) V Mediorreal	6^{8}	6	6
Q	D Kudashova	7^{10}	4	3
(Argentina) J Ortenzi	6	6
6	(Brazil) L Pigossi	3	1

Second round
1	(Colombia) C Osorio	7^{8}	4	6
(Italy) N Brancaccio	6^{6}	6	2
(Hungary) P Udvardy	4	6	6
7	(Latvia) D Semeņistaja	6	4	2
(Slovenia) V Erjavec	7^{7}	5
(United Kingdom) F Jones	6^{3}	0^{r}
WC	(Colombia) V Mediorreal	0	1
(Argentina) J Ortenzi	6	6

Quarterfinals
1	(Colombia) C Osorio	4	2
(Hungary) P Udvardy	6	6
(Slovenia) V Erjavec	6	6
(Argentina) J Ortenzi	0	3

Semifinals
(Hungary) P Udvardy	3	2
(Slovenia) V Erjavec	6	6

=== Bottom half ===
First round
5	(Argentina) J Riera	6^{5}	3
(Spain) L Romero Gormaz	7^{7}	6
WC	(Colombia) Y Lizarazo	3	2
Q	(Spain) A Herrero Liñana	6	6
Q	(Australia) T Smith	6	6
(Spain) A Bolsova	3	3
WC	(Colombia) MP Pérez	3	0
3	(United States) R Montgomery	6	6
8	(Romania) A Todoni	6	6
Q	(Slovakia) M Okáľová	0	0
(Argentina) S Sierra	6	4	6
(Ukraine) V Strakhova	1	6	3
(Colombia) E Arango	6	4	6
(France) S Janicijevic	3	6	3
WC	(Peru) L Pérez Alarcón	1	2
2	(Romania) I-C Begu	6	6

Second round
(Spain) L Romero Gormaz	6	3	6
Q	(Spain) A Herrero Liñana	4	6	3
Q	(Australia) T Smith	6	6
3	(United States) R Montgomery	3	3
8	(Romania) A Todoni	6	7^{7}
(Argentina) S Sierra	4	6^{5}
(Colombia) E Arango	2	2
2	(Romania) I-C Begu	6	6

Quarterfinals
(Spain) L Romero Gormaz	2	3
Q	(Australia) T Smith	6	6
8	(Romania) A Todoni	6^{6}	4
2	(Romania) I-C Begu	7^{8}	6

Semifinals
Q	(Australia) T Smith	1	3
2	(Romania) I-C Begu	6	6

== Qualifying ==
=== Seeds ===
1. (Brazil) Carolina Alves (qualifying competition)
2. (Australia) Tina Smith (qualified)
3. Daria Lodikova (first round)
4. (Argentina) Julieta Estable (qualifying competition)
5. (Slovakia) Martina Okáľová (qualified)
6. Daria Kudashova (qualified)
7. (Argentina) Melany Krywoj (first round, retired)
8. Ekaterina Kazionova (qualifying competition)

=== Qualifiers ===
1. (Slovakia) Martina Okáľová
2. (Australia) Tina Smith
3. (Spain) Alicia Herrero Liñana
4. Daria Kudashova

=== Draw ===
==== First qualifier ====
First round
1	(Brazil) Carolina Alves	6	0
(Bolivia) Noelia Zeballos	3	0^{r}
(Colombia) Mariana Higuita	2	0
5	(Slovakia) Martina Okáľová	6	6

Qualifying competition
1	(Brazil) Carolina Alves	4	3
5	(Slovakia) Martina Okáľová	6	6

==== Second qualifier ====
First round
2	(Australia) Tina Smith	6	6
WC	(Colombia) Sara Alba Verastegui	1	1
(Colombia) María Sánchez Uribe	4	6	4
8	Ekaterina Kazionova	6	3	6

Qualifying competition
2	(Australia) Tina Smith	6	6
8	Ekaterina Kazionova	4	4

==== Third qualifier ====
First round
3	Daria Lodikova	6^{5}	3
(Spain) Alicia Herrero Liñana	7^{7}	6
(Colombia) Yuliana Monroy	6	0
7	(Argentina) Melany Krywoj	3	0^{r}

Qualifying competition
(Spain) Alicia Herrero Liñana	6	6
(Colombia) Yuliana Monroy	1	3

==== Fourth qualifier ====
First round
4	(Argentina) Julieta Estable	6	6
WC	(Colombia) Emanuela Lares	2	3
(Colombia) María Torres Murcia	5	1
6	Daria Kudashova	7	6

Qualifying competition
4	(Argentina) Julieta Estable	7	5	3
6	Daria Kudashova	5	7	6
