= 2025 Cali Open WTA 125 – Doubles =

Doubles
- 2025 Cali Open WTA 125

Final
- Champions: (Brazil) Ana Candiotto (Brazil) Laura Pigossi
- Runners-up: (Italy) Nicole Fossa Huergo (Georgia (country)) Ekaterine Gorgodze
- Score: 6–3, 6–1

Events
| Singles | Doubles |
| ← 2024 · | Copa Bionaire | · 2026 → |

Ana Candiotto and Laura Pigossi won the title, defeating Nicole Fossa Huergo and Ekaterine Gorgodze in the final, 6–3, 6–1.

Veronika Erjavec and Kristina Mladenovic were the reigning champions, but did not participate this year.

== Seeds ==
1. (Italy) Nicole Fossa Huergo / (Georgia (country)) Ekaterine Gorgodze (final)
2. (Spain) Alicia Herrero Liñana / (Ukraine) Valeriya Strakhova (quarterfinals)
3. (Brazil) Ana Candiotto / (Brazil) Laura Pigossi (champions)
4. (Venezuela) Andrea Gámiz / (Netherlands) Eva Vedder (semifinals)

== Draw ==
Key

- Q = Qualifier
- WC = Wild card
- LL = Lucky loser
- Alt = Alternate
- ITF = ITF entry
- PR = Protected ranking
- SR = Special ranking
- SE = Special exempt
- JE = Junior exempt
- JR = Junior Accelerator Programme entrant
- CO = College Accelerator Programme entrant
- NG = Next Gen Accelerator Program entrant
- w/o = Walkover
- r = Retired
- d = Defaulted

=== Draw ===
First round
(Greece) D Papamichail (Argentina) J Riera | 7^{7} | 5 | [9]
(Bolivia) N Zeballos; A Zolotareva | 6^{3} | 7 | [11]
4 | (Venezuela) A Gámiz (Netherlands) E Vedder | 7^{7} | 6
(Argentina) L Giovannini (Mexico) M Gómez Pezuela Cano | 6^{2} | 4
(Colombia) Y Lizarazo (Colombia) MP Pérez | 6 | 6^{6} | [10]
(United States) H Chang (Serbia) K Jokić | 3 | 7^{8} | [6]
(Argentina) C Markus (Colombia) V Mediorreal | 2 | 5
(Romania) G Lee (Australia) T Smith | 6 | 7
(Argentina) J Ortenzi (Brazil) R Pereira | 3 | 5
3 | (Brazil) A Candiotto (Brazil) L Pigossi | 6 | 7
(Colombia) MI Higuita Barraza (Colombia) M Torres Murcia | 3 | 1
(France) S Janicijevic (United States) V Lepchenko | 6 | 6

Quarterfinals
1 | (Italy) N Fossa Huergo (Georgia (country)) E Gorgodze | 6 | 6
(Bolivia) N Zeballos; A Zolotareva | 3 | 1
4 | (Venezuela) A Gámiz (Netherlands) E Vedder | 7^{7} | 6
(Colombia) Y Lizarazo (Colombia) MP Pérez | 6^{4} | 3
(Romania) G Lee (Australia) T Smith | 3 | 6^{4}
3 | (Brazil) A Candiotto (Brazil) L Pigossi | 6 | 7^{7}
(France) S Janicijevic (United States) V Lepchenko | 6 | 4 | [10]
2 | (Spain) A Herrero Liñana (Ukraine) V Strakhova | 1 | 6 | [8]

Semifinals
1 | (Italy) N Fossa Huergo (Georgia (country)) E Gorgodze | 6 | 6
4 | (Venezuela) A Gámiz (Netherlands) E Vedder | 2 | 3
3 | (Brazil) A Candiotto (Brazil) L Pigossi | 7^{8} | 6
(France) S Janicijevic (United States) V Lepchenko | 6^{6} | 4

Final
1 | (Italy) N Fossa Huergo (Georgia (country)) E Gorgodze | 3 | 1
3 | (Brazil) A Candiotto (Brazil) L Pigossi | 6 | 6
