= 2011 Copa Bionaire – Doubles =

Doubles
- 2011 Copa Bionaire

Final
- Champion: (Romania) Irina-Camelia Begu (Romania) Elena Bogdan
- Runner-up: (Russia) Ekaterina Ivanova (Germany) Kathrin Wörle
- Score: 2–6, 7^{8}–6^{6}, [11–9]

Events
Singles	Doubles
← 2010 ·	Copa Bionaire	· 2012 →

Edina Gallovits-Hall and Polona Hercog were the defending champions. However, they chose not to compete this year.
In the final, 4th seeded Irina-Camelia Begu and Elena Bogdan defeated the unseeded Ekaterina Ivanova and Kathrin Wörle.

== Seeds ==
1. (Russia) Nina Bratchikova / (Russia) Alexandra Panova (semifinals)
2. (Czech Republic) Eva Birnerová / (Slovenia) Andreja Klepač (semifinals)
3. (Argentina) María Irigoyen / (Argentina) Florencia Molinero (first round)
4. (Romania) Irina-Camelia Begu / (Romania) Elena Bogdan (champions)

== Draw ==
=== Key ===
- Q = Qualifier
- WC = Wild card
- LL = Lucky loser
- Alt = Alternate
- SE = Special exempt
- PR = Protected ranking
- ITF = ITF entry
- JE = Junior exempt
- w/o = Walkover
- r = Retired
- d = Defaulted
- SR = Special ranking

== Finals ==
First round
1	(Russia) N Bratchikova (Russia) A Panova	6	5	[12]
WC	(Peru) B Botto (Colombia) M Duque	2	7	[10]
(United States) J Cohen (France) O Sanchez	1	6	[10]
(Ukraine) L Kichenok (Ukraine) N Kichenok	6	2	[12]
3	(Argentina) M Irigoyen (Argentina) F Molinero	6	2	[6]
(China) X Han (Spain) S Soler Espinosa	3	6	[10]
(Russia) E Ivanova (Germany) K Wörle	6	7
(Czech Republic) P Cetkovská (France) M Johansson	3	5
(Romania) A Cadanţu (Romania) M Gojnea	6	3	[11]
(Italy) C Dentoni (Spain) L Pous Tio	3	6	[9]
WC	(Italy) V Confalonieri (Colombia) A Moreno-Kaste	2	4
4	(Romania) I-C Begu (Romania) E Bogdan	6	6
(Argentina) P Ormaechea (Russia) V Solovieva	2	1
(Spain) L Costas-Moreira (Spain) A Parra Santonja	6	6
WC	(Colombia) C Castaño (Colombia) K Castiblanco	4	4
2	(Czech Republic) E Birnerová (Slovenia) A Klepač	6	6

Quarterfinals
1	(Russia) N Bratchikova (Russia) A Panova	6	2	[10]
(Ukraine) L Kichenok (Ukraine) N Kichenok	4	6	7
(China) X Han (Spain) S Soler Espinosa	3	5
(Russia) E Ivanova (Germany) K Wörle	6	7
(Romania) A Cadanţu (Romania) M Gojnea	4	1
4	(Romania) I-C Begu (Romania) E Bogdan	6	6
(Spain) L Costas-Moreira (Spain) A Parra Santonja	3	3
2	(Czech Republic) E Birnerová (Slovenia) A Klepač	6	6

Semifinals
1	(Russia) N Bratchikova (Russia) A Panova	4	2
(Russia) E Ivanova (Germany) K Wörle	6	6
4	(Romania) I-C Begu (Romania) E Bogdan	6	7^{7}
2	(Czech Republic) E Birnerová (Slovenia) A Klepač	1	6^{3}

Final
(Russia) E Ivanova (Germany) K Wörle	6	6^{6}	[9]
4	(Romania) I-C Begu (Romania) E Bogdan	2	7^{8}	[11]
