= ITF Women's Bogotá =

ITF Women's Bogota may refer to:

- Copa Bionaire (2007)
- Open Bogotá (2014–2007)
