= 2012 Copa Bionaire =

- Date: 6–12 February
- Edition: 6th
- Location: Cali, Colombia

Champions

Singles
- (Romania) Alexandra Dulgheru

Doubles
- (Italy) Karin Knapp / (Luxembourg) Mandy Minella
← 2011 ·	Copa Bionaire	· 2013 →

The 2012 Copa Bionaire is a professional tennis tournament played on Clay courts. It is the sixth edition of the tournament, which was part of the 2012 ITF Women's Circuit. The event took place in Cali, Colombia between 6 and 12 February 2012. It offered the prize of US$ 100,000.

== WTA entrants ==
=== Seeds ===
Country	Player	Rank^{1}	Seed
NZL	Marina Erakovic	56	1
ROU	Alexandra Dulgheru	61	2
FRA	Mathilde Johansson	73	3
ESP	Lourdes Domínguez Lino	82	4
AUT	Patricia Mayr-Achleitner	96	5
CZE	Eva Birnerová	102	6
RUS	Alexandra Panova	109	7
ROU	Alexandra Cadanțu	112	8

- ^{1} Rankings are as of January 30, 2012.

=== Other entrants ===
The following players received wildcards into the singles main draw:

- (Colombia) Catalina Castaño
- (Colombia) Karen Castiblanco
- (Colombia) Yuliana Lizarazo

The following players received entry from the qualifying draw:

- (Italy) Annalisa Bona
- (Spain) Inés Ferrer Suárez
- (Bulgaria) Alexandrina Naydenova
- (Brazil) Teliana Pereira

The following players received entry by a lucky loser spot:

- (Mexico) Ximena Hermoso

== Champions ==
=== Singles ===
(Romania) Alexandra Dulgheru def. (Luxembourg) Mandy Minella, 6–3, 1–6, 6–3

=== Doubles ===
(Italy) Karin Knapp / (Luxembourg) Mandy Minella def. (Romania) Alexandra Cadanțu / (Romania) Raluca Olaru, 6–4, 6–3
