= 2023 Copa Oster =

- Date: 30 January – 5 February
- Edition: 8th
- Category: WTA 125
- Draw: 32S/16D
- Prize money: $115,000
- Surface: Clay
- Location: Cali, Colombia
- Venue: Club Campestre de Cali

Champions

Singles
- (Argentina) Nadia Podoroska

Doubles
- (Poland) Weronika Falkowska / (Poland) Katarzyna Kawa
← 2013 ·	Copa Bionaire	· 2024 →

The 2023 Copa Oster was a professional tennis tournament played on outdoor clay courts. It was the eighth edition of the tournament and second as a WTA 125 tournament which is part of the 2023 WTA 125 tournaments. It took place at the Club Campestre in Cali, Colombia between 30 January and 5 February 2023. The event made a return to Cali after an absence of 10 years.

== Champions ==
=== Singles ===
- (Argentina) Nadia Podoroska def. (Argentina) Paula Ormaechea, 6–4, 6–2

=== Doubles ===
- (Poland) Weronika Falkowska / (Poland) Katarzyna Kawa def. (Japan) Kyōka Okamura / (China) You Xiaodi, 6–1, 5–7, [10–6]

== Singles main draw entrants ==
=== Seeds ===
Country	Player	Rank^{1}	Seed
HUN	Réka Luca Jani	111	1
BRA	Laura Pigossi	112	2
ESP	Aliona Bolsova	144	3
ARG	María Lourdes Carlé	146	4
USA	Caroline Dolehide	149	5
USA	Hailey Baptiste	156	6
CAN	Carol Zhao	169	7
MEX	Fernanda Contreras Gómez	172	8

- ^{1} Rankings as of 16 January 2023

=== Other entrants ===
The following players received wildcards into the singles main draw:

- (Colombia) Emiliana Arango
- (Colombia) María Herazo González
- (Colombia) Yuliana Lizarazo
- (Colombia) María Paulina Pérez

The following players received entry from the qualifying draw:

- (Brazil) Carolina Alves
- (Italy) Martina Colmegna
- (United States) Quinn Gleason
- (France) Marine Partaud

=== Withdrawals ===
- (Germany) Katharina Hobgarski → replaced by (Brazil) Gabriela Cé
- (France) Séléna Janicijevic → replaced by (Italy) Nuria Brancaccio
- (United Kingdom) Francesca Jones → replaced by (Argentina) Julia Riera
- (Belgium) Magali Kempen → replaced by (United States) Jamie Loeb
- (Romania) Gabriela Lee → replaced by (United States) Whitney Osuigwe
- (United States) Elizabeth Mandlik → replaced by (Poland) Weronika Falkowska
- (Netherlands) Arantxa Rus → replaced by (Ukraine) Valeriya Strakhova

=== Retirements ===
- (United States) Whitney Osuigwe

== Doubles main draw entrants ==
=== Seeds ===
Country	Player	Country	Player	Rank	Seed
~~ESP~~	~~Aliona Bolsova~~	~~USA~~	~~Caroline Dolehide~~	~~94~~	~~1~~
POL	Weronika Falkowska	POL	Katarzyna Kawa	186	2
USA	Anna Rogers	AUS	Olivia Tjandramulia	264	3
USA	Jessie Aney	UKR	Valeriya Strakhova	266	4

- ^{1} Rankings as of 16 January 2023

=== Other entrants ===
The following pair received a wildcard into the doubles main draw:

- (Colombia) Yuliana Lizarazo / (Colombia) María Paulina Pérez

The following pair received entry as alternates:

- (Mexico) Renata Zarazúa / (Colombia) Emiliana Arango

=== Withdrawals ===
- (Spain) Aliona Bolsova / (United States) Caroline Dolehide → replaced by (Mexico) Renata Zarazúa / (Colombia) Emiliana Arango
