= 2011 Copa Bionaire – Singles =

Singles
- 2011 Copa Bionaire

Final
- Champion: (Romania) Irina-Camelia Begu
- Runner-up: (Spain) Laura Pous Tió
- Score: 6–3, 7^{7}–6^{1}

Events
Singles	Doubles
← 2010 ·	Copa Bionaire	· 2012 →

Polona Hercog was the defending champion, but chose to not compete this year.
Irina-Camelia Begu defeated Laura Pous Tió in the final 6–3, 7^{7}–6^{1}.

== Seeds ==
1. (Spain) Arantxa Parra Santonja (second round)
2. (Spain) Lourdes Domínguez Lino (first round)
3. (Czech Republic) Zuzana Ondrášková (first round)
4. (Austria) Patricia Mayr-Achleitner (quarterfinals)
5. (France) Mathilde Johansson (quarterfinals)
6. (Spain) Laura Pous Tió (final)
7. (France) Olivia Sanchez (first round)
8. (Colombia) Mariana Duque-Marino (first round)

== Draw ==
=== Key ===
- Q = Qualifier
- WC = Wild card
- LL = Lucky loser
- Alt = Alternate
- SE = Special exempt
- PR = Protected ranking
- ITF = ITF entry
- JE = Junior exempt
- w/o = Walkover
- r = Retired
- d = Defaulted
- SR = Special ranking

=== Finals ===
Semifinals
(Germany) Kathrin Wörle	1	2
Q	(Romania) Irina-Camelia Begu	6	6
(Russia) Alexandra Panova	3	6	6
6	(Spain) Laura Pous Tió	6	3	3

Final
Q	(Romania) Irina-Camelia Begu	6	7^{7}
6	(Spain) Laura Pous Tió	3	6^{1}

=== Top half ===
First round
1	(Spain) A Parra Santonja	6	6
PR	(Spain) E Fernández Brugués	2	3
(Czech Republic) E Birnerová	2	6	6
(Argentina) F Molinero	6	4	2
(Colombia) Y Lizarazo	4	1
(Germany) K Wörle	6	6
Q	(Romania) IR Olaru	6	6
7	(France) O Sanchez	4	0
4	(Austria) P Mayr-Achleitner	7^{8}	6
(Italy) C Dentoni	6^{6}	4
(Colombia) K Castiblanco	1	1
(China) X Han	6	6
(United States) J Cohen	3	1
(Czech Republic) P Cetkovská	6	6
Q	(Romania) I-C Begu	6	6
8	(Colombia) M Duque-Marino	2	3

Second round
1	(Spain) A Parra Santonja	1	4
(Czech Republic) E Birnerová	6	6
(Germany) K Wörle	6	6
Q	(Romania) IR Olaru	2	4
4	(Austria) P Mayr-Achleitner	6	6^{2}	6
(China) X Han	0	7^{7}	1
(Czech Republic) P Cetkovská	6	0	5
Q	(Romania) I-C Begu	2	6	7

Quarter Finals
(Czech Republic) E Birnerová	5	2
(Germany) K Wörle	7	6
4	(Austria) P Mayr-Achleitner	4	1
Q	(Romania) I-C Begu	6	6

Semi Final
(Germany) K Wörle	1	2
Q	(Romania) I-C Begu	6	6

=== Bottom half ===
First round
5	(France) M Johansson	6	6
(Spain) B García Vidagany	0	2
(Slovakia) Z Zlochová	1	r
Q	(Germany) L Siegemund	1
(Colombia) C Castaño	0	3
(Russia) A Panova	6	6
(Russia) N Bratchikova	6	6
3	(Czech Republic) Z Ondrášková	3	2
6	(Spain) L Pous Tió	6	6
(Spain) S Soler Espinosa	4	4
Q	(Romania) A Cadanţu	6	6
(Argentina) M Irigoyen	2	1
(Slovenia) M Zec Peškirič	3	7^{7}	4
(Brazil) A-C Durate	6	6^{5}	6
(Russia) E Ivanova	4	6	6
2	(Spain) L Domínguez Lino	6	4	2

Second round
5	(France) M Johansson	3	7^{7}	6
Q	(Germany) L Siegemund	6	6^{3}	4
(Russia) A Panova	3	7	6
(Russia) N Bratchikova	6	5	4
6	(Spain) L Pous Tió	7^{7}	6
Q	(Romania) A Cadanţu	6^{5}	2
(Brazil) A-C Duarte	3	2
(Russia) E Ivanova	6	6

Quarter Finals
5	(France) M Johansson	6^{5}	4
(Russia) A Panova	7^{7}	6
6	(Spain) L Pous Tió	1	1
(Russia) E Ivanova	6	6

Semi Final
(Russia) A Panova	6	3	3
6	(Spain) L Pous Tió	3	6	6
