= 2025 Cali Open WTA 125 =

- Date: 27 October – 1 November
- Edition: 10th
- Category: WTA 125
- Draw: 32S/16D
- Prize money: $115,000
- Surface: Clay
- Location: Cali, Colombia
- Venue: Club Campestre de Cali

Champions

Singles
- (Austria) Sinja Kraus

Doubles
- (Brazil) Ana Candiotto / (Brazil) Laura Pigossi
- Copa Bionaire

The 2025 Cali Open WTA 125, also known as Kia Open, for sponsorship reasons, was a professional women's tennis tournament played on outdoor clay courts. It was the tenth edition of the tournament and part of the 2025 WTA 125 tournaments. It took place at the Club Campestre in Cali, Colombia between 27 October and 1 November 2025.

== Singles main draw entrants ==
=== Seeds ===
Country	Player	Rank^{1}	Seed
CZE	Sára Bejlek	101	1
AUT	Julia Grabher	109	2
HUN	Panna Udvardy	110	3
ESP	Leyre Romero Gormaz	133	4
AUT	Sinja Kraus	134	5
UKR	Oleksandra Oliynykova	139	6
USA	Varvara Lepchenko	153	7
ARG	Julia Riera	192	8

- ^{1} Rankings as of 20 October 2025

=== Other entrants ===
The following players received wildcards into the singles main draw:

- (Colombia) Yuliana Lizarazo
- (Colombia) Valentina Mediorreal
- (Colombia) María Paulina Pérez García
- (Colombia) María Torres Murcia

The following players received entry from the qualifying draw:

- (Argentina) Carla Markus
- (Chile) Antonia Vergara Rivera
- (Bolivia) Noelia Zeballos
- Anastasia Zolotareva

The following player received entry as a lucky loser:

- (Brazil) Ana Candiotto

=== Withdrawals ===
Before the tournament

- (Poland) Maja Chwalińska → replaced by (Australia) Tina Smith
- (France) Carole Monnet → replaced by (Brazil) Ana Candiotto (LL)
- (Argentina) Paula Ormaechea → replaced by (Italy) Jessica Pieri
- (Czech Republic) Barbora Palicová → replaced by (Italy) Nicole Fossa Huergo
- (United States) Anna Rogers → replaced by (France) Séléna Janicijevic
- (Egypt) Mayar Sherif → replaced by (Romania) Gabriela Lee
- (Italy) Martina Trevisan → replaced by (Spain) Alicia Herrero Liñana
- (Switzerland) Simona Waltert → replaced by (Ukraine) Valeriya Strakhova
- (Croatia) Tara Würth → replaced by (Argentina) Luisina Giovannini

== Doubles main draw entrants ==
=== Seeds ===
Country	Player	Country	Player	Rank	Seed
ITA	Nicole Fossa Huergo	GEO	Ekaterine Gorgodze	268	1
ESP	Alicia Herrero Liñana	UKR	Valeriya Strakhova	294	2
BRA	Ana Candiotto	BRA	Laura Pigossi	422	3
VEN	Andrea Gámiz	NED	Eva Vedder	508	4

- ^{1} Rankings as of 20 October 2025

== Champions ==
=== Singles ===
- (Austria) Sinja Kraus def. (Hungary) Panna Udvardy, 6–2, 6–0

=== Doubles ===
- (Brazil) Ana Candiotto / (Brazil) Laura Pigossi def. (Italy) Nicole Fossa Huergo / (Georgia (country)) Ekaterine Gorgodze, 6–3, 6–1
