= 2025 Cali Open WTA 125 – Singles =

Singles
- 2025 Cali Open WTA 125

Final
- Champion: (Austria) Sinja Kraus
- Runner-up: (Hungary) Panna Udvardy
- Score: 6–2, 6–0

Events
Singles	Doubles
← 2024 ·	Copa Bionaire	· 2026 →

Sinja Kraus won the title, defeating Panna Udvardy in the final, 6–2, 6–0.

Irina-Camelia Begu was the reigning champion, but did not participate this year.

== Seeds ==
1. (Czech Republic) Sára Bejlek (semifinals)
2. (Austria) Julia Grabher (quarterfinals, withdrew)
3. (Hungary) Panna Udvardy (final)
4. (Spain) Leyre Romero Gormaz (first round)
5. (Austria) Sinja Kraus (champion)
6. (Ukraine) Oleksandra Oliynykova (second round)
7. (United States) Varvara Lepchenko (quarterfinals)
8. (Argentina) Julia Riera (quarterfinals)

== Draw ==
Key

- Q = Qualifier
- WC = Wild card
- LL = Lucky loser
- Alt = Alternate
- ITF = ITF entry
- PR = Protected ranking
- SR = Special ranking
- SE = Special exempt
- JE = Junior exempt
- JR = Junior Accelerator Programme entrant
- CO = College Accelerator Programme entrant
- NG = Next Gen Accelerator Program entrant
- w/o = Walkover
- r = Retired
- d = Defaulted

=== Finals ===
Semifinals
1	(Czech Republic) Sára Bejlek	6^{4}	3
3	(Hungary) Panna Udvardy	7^{7}	6
5	(Austria) Sinja Kraus	5	6	7^{8}
(Argentina) Jazmín Ortenzi	7	3	6^{6}

Final
3	(Hungary) Panna Udvardy	2	0
5	(Austria) Sinja Kraus	6	6

=== Top half ===
First round
1	(Czech Republic) S Bejlek	6	6
(Netherlands) E Vedder	1	4
(Ukraine) V Strakhova	3	1
(Brazil) L Pigossi	6	6
(Italy) J Pieri	3	3
(Spain) A Herrero Liñana	6	6
Q	(Bolivia) N Zeballos	2	2
8	(Argentina) J Riera	6	6
3	(Hungary) P Udvardy	6	6
Q	(Chile) A Vergara Rivera	3	3
WC	(Colombia) Y Lizarazo	6	6
WC	(Colombia) MP Pérez	0	1
(Greece) D Papamichail	6	6
WC	(Colombia) V Mediorreal	2	2
LL	(Brazil) A Candiotto	2	5
7	(United States) V Lepchenko	6	7

Second round
1	(Czech Republic) S Bejlek	6	6
(Brazil) L Pigossi	4	1
(Spain) A Herrero Liñana	4	3
8	(Argentina) J Riera	6	6
3	(Hungary) P Udvardy	7^{7}	6
WC	(Colombia) Y Lizarazo	6^{4}	4
(Greece) D Papamichail	0	4
7	(United States) V Lepchenko	6	6

Quarterfinals
1	(Czech Republic) S Bejlek	6	6
8	(Argentina) J Riera	2	4
3	(Hungary) P Udvardy	7^{7}	6
7	(United States) V Lepchenko	6^{5}	0

Semifinals
1	(Czech Republic) S Bejlek	6^{4}	3
3	(Hungary) P Udvardy	7^{7}	6

=== Bottom half ===
First round
5	(Austria) S Kraus	7^{7}	6
(Argentina) L Giovannini	6^{3}	3
(Australia) T Smith	6	6
PR	(Slovenia) P Hercog	3	4
(Italy) N Fossa Huergo	2	0
Q	A Zolotareva	6	6
(France) S Janicijevic	6^{3}	6	6
4	(Spain) L Romero Gormaz	7^{7}	2	4
6	(Ukraine) O Oliynykova	7^{7}	6
(Georgia (country)) E Gorgodze	6^{5}	3
WC	(Colombia) M Torres Murcia	2	1
(Argentina) J Ortenzi	6	6
Q	(Argentina) C Markus	6	1	5
(Romania) G Lee	2	6	7
(United States) H Chang	3	3
2	(Austria) J Grabher	6	6

Second round
5	(Austria) S Kraus	6	6
(Australia) T Smith	0	4
Q	A Zolotareva	2	6	3
(France) S Janicijevic	6	3	6
6	(Ukraine) O Oliynykova	4	2
(Argentina) J Ortenzi	6	6
(Romania) G Lee	1	5
2	(Austria) J Grabher	6	7

Quarterfinals
5	(Austria) S Kraus	6	6
(France) S Janicijevic	2	1
(Argentina) J Ortenzi	w/o
2	(Austria) J Grabher

Semifinals
5	(Austria) S Kraus	5	6	7^{8}
(Argentina) J Ortenzi	7	3	6^{6}

== Qualifying ==
=== Seeds ===
1. (Serbia) Katarina Jokić (qualifying competition)
2. Anastasia Zolotareva (qualified)
3. (Slovakia) Martina Okáľová (first round)
4. (Brazil) Ana Candiotto (qualifying competition, lucky loser)
5. (Bulgaria) Gergana Topalova (qualifying competition)
6. (Chile) Antonia Vergara Rivera (qualified)
7. (Bolivia) Noelia Zeballos (qualified)
8. (Argentina) Carla Markus (qualified)

=== Qualifiers ===
1. (Chile) Antonia Vergara Rivera
2. Anastasia Zolotareva
3. (Argentina) Carla Markus
4. (Bolivia) Noelia Zeballos

=== Lucky loser ===
1. (Brazil) Ana Candiotto

=== Qualifying draw ===
==== First qualifier ====
First round				Qualifying competition
				1	(Serbia) Katarina Jokić	2	7	3
				6	(Chile) Antonia Vergara Rivera	6	5	6
WC	(Colombia) Isabella Ascencio Jaramillo	0	0	6	(Chile) Antonia Vergara Rivera	6	5	6
6	(Chile) Antonia Vergara Rivera	6	6

==== Second qualifier ====
First round				Qualifying competition
				2	Anastasia Zolotareva	2	6	6
				5	(Bulgaria) Gergana Topalova	6	4	2
	(Brazil) Rebeca Pereira	0	3	5	(Bulgaria) Gergana Topalova	6	4	2
5	(Bulgaria) Gergana Topalova	6	6

==== Third qualifier ====
First round
3	(Slovakia) Martina Okáľová	6^{5}	1
(Colombia) María José Sánchez Uribe	7^{7}	6
WC	(Colombia) María Isabel Suárez	0	1
8	(Argentina) Carla Markus	6	6

Qualifying competition
(Colombia) María José Sánchez Uribe	1	2
8	(Argentina) Carla Markus	6	6

==== Fourth qualifier ====
First round
4	(Brazil) Ana Candiotto	6	6
(Colombia) Mariana Higuita	3	3
(Mexico) Sabastiani León	3	4
7	(Bolivia) Noelia Zeballos	6	6

Qualifying competition
4	(Brazil) Ana Candiotto	4	0
7	(Bolivia) Noelia Zeballos	6	6
