= 2023 Copa Oster – Doubles =

Doubles
- 2023 Copa Oster

Final
- Champions: (Poland) Weronika Falkowska (Poland) Katarzyna Kawa
- Runners-up: (Japan) Kyōka Okamura (China) You Xiaodi
- Score: 6–1, 5–7, [10–6]

Events
Singles	Doubles
← 2013 ·	Copa Bionaire	· 2024 →

This was the first WTA 125 tournament in Cali since 2013. Catalina Castaño and Mariana Duque were the champions when the event was last held, but they have both since retired from professional tennis.

Weronika Falkowska and Katarzyna Kawa defeated Kyōka Okamura and You Xiaodi in the final, 6–1, 5–7, [10–6] to win the women's doubles tennis title at the 2023 Copa Oster.

== Seeds ==
1. (Spain) Aliona Bolsova / (United States) Caroline Dolehide (withdrew)
2. (Poland) Weronika Falkowska / (Poland) Katarzyna Kawa (champions)
3. (United States) Anna Rogers / (Australia) Olivia Tjandramulia (first round)
4. (United States) Jessie Aney / (Ukraine) Valeriya Strakhova (first round)

== Draw ==
=== Key ===
- Q = Qualifier
- WC = Wild card
- LL = Lucky loser
- Alt = Alternate
- SE = Special exempt
- PR = Protected ranking
- ITF = ITF entry
- JE = Junior exempt
- w/o = Walkover
- r = Retired
- d = Defaulted
- SR = Special ranking

=== Draw ===
First round
Alt	(Colombia) E Arango (Mexico) R Zarazúa	7^{7}	6
(United States) R McAdoo (France) M Partaud	6^{1}	2
(United States) H Baptiste (United States) W Osuigwe	3	3
(Japan) K Okamura (China) X You	6	6
3	(United States) A Rogers (Australia) O Tjandramulia	6^{6}	3
(United States) Q Gleason (France) E Lechemia	7^{8}	6
WC	(Colombia) Y Lizarazo (Colombia) MP Pérez García	6	6
(Chinese Taipei) C-y Hsu (Brazil) R Pereira	0	4
(Argentina) ML Carlé (Argentina) J Riera	5	6	[10]
(Brazil) C Alves (United States) J Loeb	7	4	[4]
A Anshba (United States) E Kalieva	6^{1}	6	[10]
4	(United States) J Aney (Ukraine) V Strakhova	7^{7}	3	[6]
(Argentina) N Podoroska (Cyprus) R Șerban	6	6
(Hungary) RL Jani (Brazil) L Pigossi	1	4
(Italy) N Brancaccio (Colombia) M Herazo González	0	5
2	(Poland) W Falkowska (Poland) K Kawa	6	7

Quarterfinals
Alt	(Colombia) E Arango (Mexico) R Zarazúa	7^{7}	5	[4]
(Japan) K Okamura (China) X You	6^{2}	7	[10]
(United States) Q Gleason (France) E Lechemia	6	6
WC	(Colombia) Y Lizarazo (Colombia) MP Pérez García	4	4
(Argentina) ML Carlé (Argentina) J Riera	7	4	[4]
A Anshba (United States) E Kalieva	5	6	[10]
(Argentina) N Podoroska (Cyprus) R Șerban	2	7	[11]
2	(Poland) W Falkowska (Poland) K Kawa	6	5	[13]

Semifinals
(Japan) K Okamura (China) X You	6	6^{3}	[10]
(United States) Q Gleason (France) E Lechemia	4	7^{7}	[5]
A Anshba (United States) E Kalieva	2	6^{6}
2	(Poland) W Falkowska (Poland) K Kawa	6	7^{8}

Final
(Japan) K Okamura (China) X You	1	7	[6]
2	(Poland) W Falkowska (Poland) K Kawa	6	5	[10]
