= 2012 Copa Bionaire – Singles =

Singles
- 2012 Copa Bionaire

Final
- Champion: (Romania) Alexandra Dulgheru
- Runner-up: (Luxembourg) Mandy Minella
- Score: 6–3, 1–6, 6–3

Events
Singles	Doubles
← 2011 ·	Copa Bionaire	· 2013 →

Irina-Camelia Begu was the defending champion, but decided not to participate this year.

Alexandra Dulgheru won the title, defeating Mandy Minella in the final, 6–3, 1–6, 6–3.

== Seeds ==
1. (New Zealand) Marina Erakovic (second round)
2. (Romania) Alexandra Dulgheru (champion)
3. (France) Mathilde Johansson (first round)
4. (Spain) Lourdes Domínguez Lino (semifinals)
5. (Austria) Patricia Mayr-Achleitner (second round)
6. (Czech Republic) Eva Birnerová (second round)
7. (Russia) Alexandra Panova (quarterfinals)
8. (Romania) Alexandra Cadanțu (quarterfinals)

== Draw ==
=== Key ===
- Q = Qualifier
- WC = Wild card
- LL = Lucky loser
- Alt = Alternate
- SE = Special exempt
- PR = Protected ranking
- ITF = ITF entry
- JE = Junior exempt
- w/o = Walkover
- r = Retired
- d = Defaulted
- SR = Special ranking

=== Finals ===
Semifinals
(Luxembourg) Mandy Minella	6	6
(Kazakhstan) Sesil Karatantcheva	4	1
4	(Spain) Lourdes Domínguez Lino	6	2	5
2	(Romania) Alexandra Dulgheru	3	6	7

Final
(Luxembourg) Mandy Minella	3	6	3
2	(Romania) Alexandra Dulgheru	6	1	6

=== Top half ===
First round
1	(New Zealand) M Erakovic	6	6^{2}	6
WC	(Colombia) C Castaño	2	7^{7}	3
(Luxembourg) M Minella	6	6
(Puerto Rico) M Puig	3	4
(Italy) C Dentoni	3	6	5
(United States) J Cohen	6	1	7
(Spain) L Arruabarrena-Vecino	7^{7}	4	3
6	(Czech Republic) E Birnerová	6^{2}	6	6
3	(France) M Johansson	6	2	3
(Spain) E Cabeza Candela	0	6	6
(Kazakhstan) S Karatantcheva	4	6	6
(Russia) V Savinykh	6	2	4
(Germany) K Wörle	7^{7}	6
(United States) T Luzhanska	6^{3}	3
(Colombia) M Duque-Mariño	7	5	2
5	(Austria) P Mayr-Achleitner	2	7	6

Second round
1	(New Zealand) M Erakovic	3	3
(Luxembourg) M Minella	6	6
(United States) J Cohen	6	6
6	(Czech Republic) E Birnerová	3	4
(Spain) E Cabeza Candela	6^{3}	1
(Kazakhstan) S Karatantcheva	7^{7}	6
(Germany) K Wörle	4	6	6
5	(Austria) P Mayr-Achleitner	6	1	0

Quarterfinals
(Luxembourg) M Minella	6	6
(United States) J Cohen	4	3
(Kazakhstan) S Karatantcheva	6	6
(Germany) K Wörle	3	3

Semifinals
(Luxembourg) M Minella	6	6
(Kazakhstan) S Karatantcheva	4	1

=== Bottom half ===
First round
7	(Russia) A Panova	6	6
(Italy) K Knapp	4	1
Q	(Brazil) T Pereira	6	6
LL	(Mexico) X Hermoso	1	2
(Romania) E Gallovits-Hall	2	1
(Spain) L Costas-Moreira	6	6
WC	(Colombia) Y Lizarazo	4	3
4	(Spain) L Domínguez Lino	6	6
8	(Romania) A Cadanțu	6	6
Q	(Italy) A Bona	4	0
(Slovenia) P Rampre	6	6
WC	(Colombia) K Castiblanco	3	2
Q	(Bulgaria) A Naydenova	1	5
Q	(Spain) I Ferrer Suárez	6	7
(Canada) S Fichman	2	0
2	(Romania) A Dulgheru	6	6

Second round
7	(Russia) A Panova	6	6
Q	(Brazil) T Pereira	2	2
(Spain) L Costas-Moreira	1	3
4	(Spain) L Domínguez Lino	6	6
8	(Romania) A Cadanțu	6	5	7^{8}
(Slovenia) P Rampre	4	7	6^{6}
Q	(Spain) I Ferrer Suárez	6^{9}	4
2	(Romania) A Dulgheru	7^{11}	6

Quarterfinals
7	(Russia) A Panova	3	3
4	(Spain) L Domínguez Lino	6	6
8	(Romania) A Cadanțu	2	3
2	(Romania) A Dulgheru	6	6

Semifinals
4	(Spain) L Domínguez Lino	6	2	5
2	(Romania) A Dulgheru	3	6	7
