= 2011 Copa Bionaire =

- Date: February 7 – 13
- Edition: 5th
- Location: Cali, Colombia

Champions

Singles
- (Romania) Irina-Camelia Begu

Doubles
- (Romania) Irina-Camelia Begu / (Romania) Elena Bogdan
← 2010 ·	Copa Bionaire	· 2012 →

The 2011 Copa Bionaire was a professional tennis tournament played on outdoor clay courts. It was the fifth edition of the tournament which was part of the 2011 ITF Women's Circuit. It took place in Cali, Colombia between 7 and 13 February 2011.

The 2011 edition was one of the biggest ITF Circuit Tournaments of the year with US$100,000 in prize money.

== WTA entrants ==
=== Seeds ===
Country	Player	Rank^{1}	Seed
ESP	Arantxa Parra Santonja	75	1
ESP	Lourdes Domínguez Lino	77	2
CZE	Zuzana Ondrášková	82	3
AUT	Patricia Mayr-Achleitner	98	4
FRA	Mathilde Johansson	99	5
ESP	Laura Pous Tió	105	6
FRA	Olivia Sanchez	126	7
COL	Mariana Duque-Marino	136	8

- Rankings are as of January 31, 2011.

=== Other entrants ===
The following players received wildcards into the singles main draw:

- (Brazil) Ana Clara Duarte
- (Colombia) Karen Castiblanco
- (Colombia) Yuliana Lizarazo
- (Slovakia) Zuzana Zlochová

The following players received entry from the qualifying draw:

- (Germany) Laura Siegemund
- (Romania) Irina-Camelia Begu
- (Romania) Alexandra Cadanţu
- (Romania) Ioana Raluca Olaru

== Champions ==
=== Singles ===
(Romania) Irina-Camelia Begu def. (Spain) Laura Pous Tió, 6–3, 7–6(1)

=== Doubles ===
(Romania) Irina-Camelia Begu / (Romania) Elena Bogdan def. (Russia) Ekaterina Ivanova / (Germany) Kathrin Wörle, 2–6, 7–6(6), [11–9]
