= 2023 Copa Oster – Singles =

Singles
- 2023 Copa Oster

Final
- Champion: (Argentina) Nadia Podoroska
- Runner-up: (Argentina) Paula Ormaechea
- Score: 6–4, 6–2

Events
Singles	Doubles
← 2013 ·	Copa Bionaire	· 2024 →

This was the first WTA 125 tournament in Cali since 2013. Lara Arruabarrena was the champion when the event was last held, but she retired from professional tennis in August 2022.

Nadia Podoroska won the title, defeating Paula Ormaechea in the final, 6–4, 6–2.

== Seeds ==
1. (Hungary) Réka Luca Jani (first round)
2. (Brazil) Laura Pigossi (semifinals)
3. (Spain) Aliona Bolsova (second round)
4. (Argentina) María Lourdes Carlé (first round)
5. (United States) Caroline Dolehide (first round)
6. (United States) Hailey Baptiste (first round)
7. (Canada) Carol Zhao (first round)
8. (Mexico) Fernanda Contreras Gómez (quarterfinals)

== Draw ==
=== Key ===
- Q = Qualifier
- WC = Wild card
- LL = Lucky loser
- Alt = Alternate
- SE = Special exempt
- PR = Protected ranking
- ITF = ITF entry
- JE = Junior exempt
- w/o = Walkover
- r = Retired
- d = Defaulted
- SR = Special ranking

=== Finals ===
Semifinals
(Argentina) Nadia Podoroska	6	6
WC	(Colombia) Emiliana Arango	4	1
(Argentina) Paula Ormaechea	7	6
2	(Brazil) Laura Pigossi	5	3

Final
(Argentina) Nadia Podoroska	6	6
(Argentina) Paula Ormaechea	4	2

=== Top half ===
First round
1	(Hungary) RL Jani	0	2
(Argentina) N Podoroska	6	6
(United States) J Loeb	3	4
(France) C Monnet	6	6
WC	(Colombia) MP Pérez	0	4
(China) X You	6	6
Q	(France) M Partaud	1	6	1
8	(Mexico) F Contreras Gómez	6	1	6
4	(Argentina) ML Carlé	4	2
Q	(Italy) M Colmegna	6	6
WC	(Colombia) Y Lizarazo	4
(United States) W Osuigwe	2^{r}
(Mexico) R Zarazúa	6^{4}	6	6
(United States) J Aney	7^{7}	0	1
WC	(Colombia) E Arango	6	6
7	(Canada) C Zhao	4	3

Second round
(Argentina) N Podoroska	4	6	6
(France) C Monnet	6	3	1
(China) X You	2	0
8	(Mexico) F Contreras Gómez	6	6
Q	(Italy) M Colmegna	7	6
WC	(Colombia) Y Lizarazo	5	4
(Mexico) R Zarazúa	3	3
WC	(Colombia) E Arango	6	6

Quarterfinals
(Argentina) N Podoroska	6	6
8	(Mexico) F Contreras Gómez	3	3
Q	(Italy) M Colmegna	1	5
WC	(Colombia) E Arango	6	7

Semifinals
(Argentina) N Podoroska	6	6
WC	(Colombia) E Arango	4	1

=== Bottom half ===
First round
6	(United States) H Baptiste	7	6^{4}	4
(United States) E Kalieva	5	7^{7}	6
(Italy) N Brancaccio	7	6
(Argentina) J Riera	5	3
(Poland) W Falkowska	7	0	1
(Argentina) P Ormaechea	5	6	6
(Poland) K Kawa	6^{1}	5
3	(Spain) A Bolsova	7^{7}	7
5	(United States) C Dolehide	6^{5}	6	6^{4}
Q	(Brazil) C Alves	7^{7}	3	7^{7}
WC	(Colombia) M Herazo González	2	2
(Ukraine) V Strakhova	6	6
(Cyprus) R Șerban	5	6	7^{7}
Q	(United States) Q Gleason	7	1	6^{4}
(Brazil) G Cé	1	1
2	(Brazil) L Pigossi	6	6

Second round
(United States) E Kalieva	6	4	6
(Italy) N Brancaccio	3	6	2
(Argentina) P Ormaechea	7^{7}	6
3	(Spain) A Bolsova	6^{4}	3
Q	(Brazil) C Alves	1	7	1
(Ukraine) V Strakhova	6	5	6
(Cyprus) R Șerban	2	3
2	(Brazil) L Pigossi	6	6

Quarterfinals
(United States) E Kalieva	5	6	3
(Argentina) P Ormaechea	7	3	6
(Ukraine) V Strakhova	3	6	3
2	(Brazil) L Pigossi	6	3	6

Semifinals
(Argentina) P Ormaechea	7	6
2	(Brazil) L Pigossi	5	3

== Qualifying ==
=== Seeds ===
1. (Brazil) Carolina Alves (qualified)
2. (Japan) Kyōka Okamura (first round)
3. (Germany) Luisa Meyer auf der Heide (first round)
4. (Ukraine) Valeriya Strakhova (moved to main draw)
5. (Italy) Martina Colmegna (qualified)
6. (France) Marine Partaud (qualified)
7. (Australia) Olivia Tjandramulia (first round)
8. Amina Anshba (qualifying competition)

=== Qualifiers ===
1. (Brazil) Carolina Alves
2. (Italy) Martina Colmegna
3. (United States) Quinn Gleason
4. (France) Marine Partaud

=== Draw ===
==== First qualifier ====
First round
1	(Brazil) Carolina Alves	6	6
(United States) Alexandra Riley	0	0
(Germany) Emily Seibold	6	6
7	(Australia) Olivia Tjandramulia	2	1

Qualifying competition
1	(Brazil) Carolina Alves	6	6
(Germany) Emily Seibold	4	3

==== Second qualifier ====
First round
2	(Japan) Kyōka Okamura	2	3
(Canada) Cadence Brace	6	6
(United States) Sabastiani León	0	0
5	(Italy) Martina Colmegna	6	6

Qualifying competition
(Canada) Cadence Brace	1	4
5	(Italy) Martina Colmegna	6	6

==== Third qualifier ====
First round
3	(Germany) Luisa Meyer auf der Heide	1	1
PR	(United States) Quinn Gleason	6	6
WC	(Colombia) María Paula Vargas Triana	0	0
8	Amina Anshba	6	6

Qualifying competition
PR	(United States) Quinn Gleason	4	6	6
8	Amina Anshba	6	4	2

==== Fourth qualifier ====
First round
Alt	(Colombia) María Torres Murcia	3	2
(Colombia) Yuliana Monroy	6	6
WC	(Colombia) María Paz Ospina	0	1
6	(France) Marine Partaud	6	6

Qualifying competition
(Colombia) Yuliana Monroy	6	3	1
6	(France) Marine Partaud	4	6	6
