= 2013 Copa Bionaire – Singles =

Singles
- 2013 Copa Bionaire

Final
- Champion: (Spain) Lara Arruabarrena Vecino
- Runner-up: (Colombia) Catalina Castaño
- Score: 6–3, 6–2

Events
Singles	Doubles
← 2012 ·	Copa Bionaire	· 2014 →

Alexandra Dulgheru was the defending champion, but lost to Lara Arruabarrena Vecino in the second round. Arruabarrena Vecino went on to win the title, defeating Catalina Castaño in the final, 6–3, 6–2.

== Seeds ==
1. (Luxembourg) Mandy Minella (second round)
2. (Spain) Lara Arruabarrena Vecino (champion)
3. (Romania) Alexandra Cadanțu (second round)
4. (Russia) Alexandra Panova (quarterfinals)
5. (Spain) María Teresa Torró Flor (first round)
6. (Ukraine) Elina Svitolina (semifinals)
7. (Russia) Nina Bratchikova (second round)
8. (Germany) Tatjana Malek (first round)

== Draw ==
=== Key ===
- Q = Qualifier
- WC = Wild card
- LL = Lucky loser
- Alt = Alternate
- SE = Special exempt
- PR = Protected ranking
- ITF = ITF entry
- JE = Junior exempt
- w/o = Walkover
- r = Retired
- d = Defaulted
- SR = Special ranking

=== Finals ===
Semifinals
6	(Ukraine) Elina Svitolina	6	4	4
WC	(Colombia) Catalina Castaño	2	6	6
(Argentina) Paula Ormaechea	3	1
2	(Spain) Lara Arruabarrena Vecino	6	6

Final
WC	(Colombia) Catalina Castaño	3	2
2	(Spain) Lara Arruabarrena Vecino	6	6

=== Top half ===
First round
1	(Luxembourg) M Minella	2	6	6
Q	(Spain) A Parra Santonja	6	3	2
WC	(Brazil) MF Alves	0	2
(Colombia) M Duque Mariño	6	6
(United States) G Min	2	1
(United States) J Cohen	6	6
(Latvia) A Sevastova	3	6^{7}
6	(Ukraine) E Svitolina	6	7^{9}
3	(Romania) A Cadanțu	3	6	6
(Spain) L Pous Tió	6	3	1
(Canada) S Dubois	6	4	6^{5}
(Kazakhstan) S Karatantcheva	4	6	7^{7}
WC	(Colombia) C Castaño	6	6
Q	(Spain) I Ferrer Suárez	1	3
(Czech Republic) E Birnerová	7^{7}	3	3
7	(Russia) N Bratchikova	6^{4}	6	6

Second round
1	(Luxembourg) M Minella	6	5	1
(Colombia) M Duque Mariño	4	7	6
(United States) J Cohen	6^{2}	6^{5}
6	(Ukraine) E Svitolina	7^{7}	7^{7}
3	(Romania) A Cadanțu	4	7	2
(Kazakhstan) S Karatantcheva	6	5	6
WC	(Colombia) C Castaño	7^{8}	6
7	(Russia) N Bratchikova	6^{6}	2

Quarterfinals
(Colombia) M Duque Mariño	2	5
6	(Ukraine) E Svitolina	6	7
(Kazakhstan) S Karatantcheva	7	3	3
WC	(Colombia) C Castaño	5	6	6

Semifinals
6	(Ukraine) E Svitolina	6	4	4
WC	(Colombia) C Castaño	2	6	6

=== Bottom half ===
First round
5	(Spain) MT Torró Flor	3	6^{4}
(Argentina) P Ormaechea	6	7^{7}
(Spain) E Cabeza Candela	6	6
LL	(Ukraine) K Kozlova	4	3
(Canada) E Bouchard	7	6
Q	(France) L Thorpe	5	2
Q	(Slovenia) M Zec Peškirič	3	2
4	(Russia) A Panova	6	6
8	(Germany) T Malek	2	0
(Canada) S Fichman	6	6
(Brazil) T Pereira	6	6
WC	(Colombia) Y Lizarazo	3	0
(Germany) D Pfizenmaier	7^{12}	5	3
WC	(Romania) A Dulgheru	6^{10}	7	6
(United States) C Scholl	2	0
2	(Spain) L Arruabarrena Vecino	6	6

Second round
(Argentina) P Ormaechea	6^{8}	6	6
(Spain) E Cabeza Candela	7^{10}	2	1
(Canada) E Bouchard	6	5	6^{4}
4	(Russia) A Panova	3	7	7^{7}
(Canada) S Fichman	6	3	2
(Brazil) T Pereira	0	6	6
WC	(Romania) A Dulgheru	5	6	3
2	(Spain) L Arruabarrena Vecino	7	4	6

Quarterfinals
(Argentina) P Ormaechea	7^{7}	3	6
4	(Russia) A Panova	6^{2}	6	2
(Brazil) T Pereira	3	4
2	(Spain) L Arruabarrena Vecino	6	6

Semifinals
(Argentina) P Ormaechea	3	1
2	(Spain) L Arruabarrena Vecino	6	6
