= 2013 Copa Bionaire – Doubles =

Doubles
- 2013 Copa Bionaire

Final
- Champions: (Colombia) Catalina Castaño (Colombia) Mariana Duque Mariño
- Runners-up: (Argentina) Florencia Molinero (Brazil) Teliana Pereira
- Score: 3–6, 6–1, [10–5]

Events
Singles	Doubles
← 2012 ·	Copa Bionaire	· 2014 →

Karin Knapp and Mandy Minella were the defending champions but Knapp chose not to participate. Minella played with Elina Svitolina, but they lost in the first round to Estrella Cabeza Candela and Laura Pous Tió.

Catalina Castaño and Mariana Duque Mariño won the title, defeating Florencia Molinero and Teliana Pereira in the final, 3–6, 6–1, [10–5].

== Seeds ==
1. (Czech Republic) Eva Birnerová / (Germany) Tatjana Malek (semifinals)
2. (Russia) Nina Bratchikova / (Georgia (country)) Oksana Kalashnikova (first round)
3. (Spain) Inés Ferrer Suárez / (Spain) Arantxa Parra Santonja (quarterfinals)
4. (Colombia) Catalina Castaño / (Colombia) Mariana Duque Mariño (champions)

== Draw ==
=== Key ===
- Q = Qualifier
- WC = Wild card
- LL = Lucky loser
- Alt = Alternate
- SE = Special exempt
- PR = Protected ranking
- ITF = ITF entry
- JE = Junior exempt
- w/o = Walkover
- r = Retired
- d = Defaulted
- SR = Special ranking

First round
1	(Czech Republic) E Birnerová (Germany) T Malek	6	6
(United States) J Cohen (France) L Thorpe	4	2
(Romania) E Bogdan (Romania) A Cadanțu	3	4
(Canada) S Fichman (Brazil) PC Gonçalves	6	6
4	(Colombia) C Castaño (Colombia) M Duque Mariño	7	6
(United States) N Melichar (United States) C Scholl	5	1
(Brazil) MF Alves (Canada) E Bouchard	6	6^{7}	[6]
(Poland) M Linette (Poland) K Piter	2	7^{9}	[10]
(Ukraine) K Kozlova (Belarus) P Pekhova	7	3	[6]
(Argentina) F Molinero (Brazil) T Pereira	5	6	[10]
(Argentina) M Auroux (Argentina) M Irigoyen	4	6	[8]
3	(Spain) I Ferrer Suárez (Spain) A Parra Santonja	6	4	[10]
Alt	(Spain) E Cabeza Candela (Spain) L Pous Tió	6	2	[10]
(Luxembourg) M Minella (Ukraine) E Svitolina	3	6	[8]
(Switzerland) C Perrin (Slovenia) M Zec Peškirič	7^{9}	6
2	(Russia) N Bratchikova (Georgia (country)) O Kalashnikova	6^{7}	1

Quarterfinals
1	(Czech Republic) E Birnerová (Germany) T Malek	6	6
(Canada) S Fichman (Brazil) PC Gonçalves	2	1
4	(Colombia) C Castaño (Colombia) M Duque Mariño	6	1	[10]
(Poland) M Linette (Poland) K Piter	4	6	[3]
(Argentina) F Molinero (Brazil) T Pereira	6	6
3	(Spain) I Ferrer Suárez (Spain) A Parra Santonja	3	3
Alt	(Spain) E Cabeza Candela (Spain) L Pous Tió	6	4	[5]
(Switzerland) C Perrin (Slovenia) M Zec Peškirič	2	6	[10]

Semifinals
1	(Czech Republic) E Birnerová (Germany) T Malek	4	4
4	(Colombia) C Castaño (Colombia) M Duque Mariño	6	6
(Argentina) F Molinero (Brazil) T Pereira	6^{6}	6	[13]
(Switzerland) C Perrin (Slovenia) M Zec Peškirič	7^{8}	3	[11]

Final
4	(Colombia) C Castaño (Colombia) M Duque Mariño	3	6	[10]
(Argentina) F Molinero (Brazil) T Pereira	6	1	[5]
