= Catalina Castaño =

Colombian tennis player

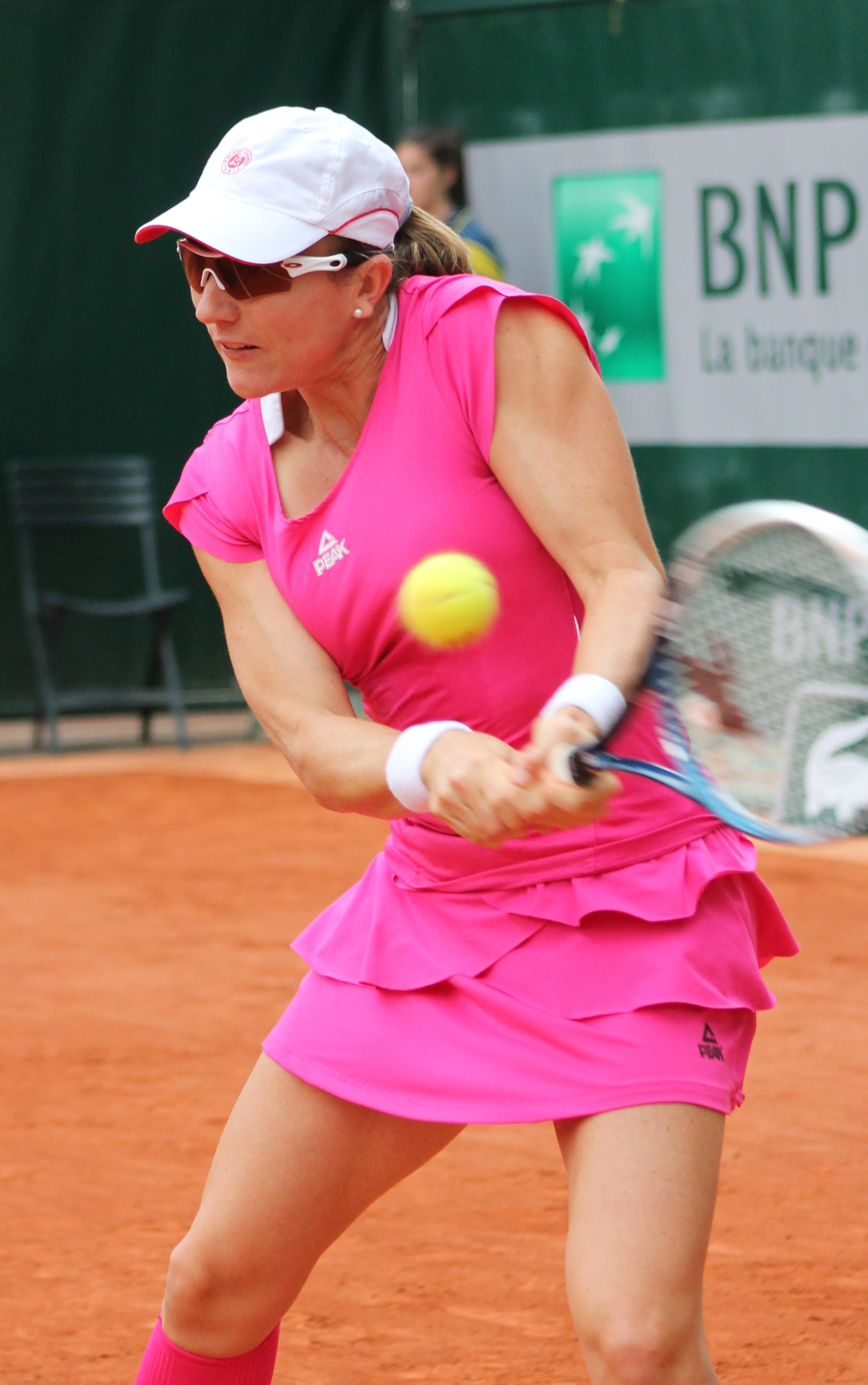
- Catalina Castaño at the 2013 French Open
- Country (sports): Colombia
- Residence: Pereira
- Born: 7 July 1979 (age 46) Pereira
- Height: 1.71 m (5 ft 7 in)
- Turned pro: January 1998
- Retired: 2014
- Plays: Right (two-handed backhand)
- Prize money: $1,162,113

Singles
- Career record: 421–369
- Career titles: 6 ITF
- Highest ranking: No. 35 (10 July 2006)

Grand Slam singles results
- Australian Open: 2R (2006, 2008)
- French Open: 2R (2001, 2005-07)
- Wimbledon: 1R (2001, 2004–08)
- US Open: 2R (2005)

Doubles
- Career record: 118–161
- Career titles: 1 WTA, 1 WTA 125
- Highest ranking: No. 71 (8 July 2013)

Grand Slam doubles results
- Australian Open: 2R (2006, 2007)
- French Open: 2R (2005, 2013)
- Wimbledon: 3R (2008)
- US Open: 2R (2006)

Team competitions
- Fed Cup: 51–23
Medal record
Representing Colombia
Men's tennis
Pan American Games
Bronze medal – third place	2011 Guadalajara	Doubles

Catalina Castaño Álvarez (Latin American Spanish: [kataˈlina kasˈtaɲo ˈalβares]; born 7 July 1979) is a Colombian former tennis player. Her highest singles ranking is world No. 35 which she achieved July 2006.

In her career, she won ten titles on the ITF Women's Circuit, six in singles and four in doubles, as well as one doubles title on both the WTA Tour and Challenger Tour.

Castaño defeated top-20 players such as Nicole Vaidišová, Anna-Lena Grönefeld, Patty Schnyder, Paola Suárez, Li Na and Lucie Šafářová. She was coached by Peruvian-born British citizen Pablo Giacopelli since 2004.

== Career summary ==
=== 1999–2004 ===
In 1999 she won her first ITF title in Santiago. The following year she won two ITF titles in Midlothian and Cali. In 2001, she reached the quarterfinals in her home tournament of Bogotá, Colombia (Tier III). In 2002, Castaño advanced the semifinals in Bogotá. She reached four ITF finals, winning two of them - in Gorizia and Campobasso. She won 39 matches in the year and lost 18. In 2004, she reached the quarterfinals in Bogotá for the third time. She was the last player to be defeated by Martina Navratilova at Wimbledon in the ladies singles, losing the match 0–6, 1–6. She won her sixth ITF title in Orbetello.

=== 2005 ===
In April, she won five matches in Miami (Tier I) including back-to-back wins over world No. 19, Paola Suárez, and world No. 13, Patty Schnyder, before falling to world No. 9, Venus Williams, in three sets in the round of 16. In May, she won four matches in Rome (Tier I) before losing to world No. 10, Vera Zvonareva, in the round of 16. In August, she reached her first ever WTA Tour final in Budapest. She lost to the top seed Anna Smashnova in the final, in straight sets. In October, she reached the semifinals in Seoul (Tier IV) but lost to the eventual champion Nicole Vaidišová.

=== 2006 ===
She commenced January with a semifinal showing in Canberra (Tier IV) and passed the first round of the Australian Open for the first time. In Charleston in mid-April, Catalina reached her first Tier I quarterfinal, after defeating Ashley Harkleroad, Nicole Vaidišová and Marion Bartoli. Her two-sets win over Vaidišová, who was ranked 14 at the time, was her best win of the year. The following week in Berlin, Catalina beat Anna-Lena Grönefeld, who was ranked 14 at the time. It was her second win over a top-15 player in as many weeks. In May, she reached the quarterfinals in Istanbul (Tier III) for the first time. She reached her highest ranking of No. 35 on July 16.

=== 2007 ===
Catalina commenced the new season with a solid start, recording two quarterfinal appearances at the Gold Coast and Hobart in January. At the Gold Coast, she defeated Li Na who was ranked 21 at the time.

=== 2014 ===
Castaño retired from professional tennis after a diagnosis of breast cancer.

== WTA Tour finals ==
=== Singles: 1 (runner-up) ===
Outcome	Date	Tournament	Tier	Surface	Opponent	Score
Runner-up	Jul 2005	Budapest Grand Prix, Hungary	Tier IV	Clay	(Israel) Anna Smashnova	2–6, 2–6

=== Doubles: 2 (1 title, 1 runner-up) ===
Outcome	Date	Tournament	Tier	Surface	Partner	Opponents	Score
Winner	Jul 2012	Swedish Open, Båstad	International	Clay	(Colombia) Mariana Duque Mariño	(Czech Republic) Eva Hrdinová (Bosnia and Herzegovina) Mervana Jugić-Salkić	4–6, 7–5, [10–5]
Runner-up	Mar 2013	Mexican Open, Acapulco	International	Clay	(Colombia) Mariana Duque Mariño	(Spain) Lourdes Domínguez Lino (Spain) Arantxa Parra Santonja	4–6, 6–7^{(1–7)}

== WTA Challenger finals ==
=== Singles: 1 (runner-up) ===
Result	W–L	Date	Tournament	Surface	Opponent	Score
Loss	0–1	Feb 2013	Copa Bionaire, Colombia	Clay	(Spain) Lara Arruabarrena	3–6, 2–6

=== Doubles: 1 (title) ===
Result	W–L	Date	Tournament	Surface	Partner	Opponents	Score
Win	1–0	Feb 2013	Copa Bionaire, Colombia	Clay	(Colombia) Mariana Duque Mariño	(Argentina) Florencia Molinero (Brazil) Teliana Pereira	3–6, 6–1, [10–5]

== ITF Circuit finals ==
Legend
$100,000 tournaments
$75,000 tournaments
$50,000 tournaments
$25,000 tournaments
$10,000 tournaments

=== Singles (6–7) ===
Result	No.	Date	Tournament	Surface	Opponent	Score
Win	1.	29 March 1999	ITF Santiago, Chile	Clay	(Argentina) María Fernanda Landa	6–4, 6–2
Loss	1.	18 October 1999	ITF Nashville, United States	Hard	(Argentina) Florencia Labat	1–6, 1–6
Win	2.	8 May 2000	ITF Midlothian, Canada	Clay	(Austria) Evelyn Fauth	6–3, 7–5
Loss	2.	23 April 2000	ITF San Luis Potosí, Mexico	Clay	(Venezuela) Milagros Sequera	4–6, 6–3, 5–7
Loss	3.	13 November 2000	ITF Naples, United States	Clay	(Netherlands) Yvette Basting	0–4, 0–4, 2–4
Win	3.	10 December 2000	ITF Bogotá, Colombia	Clay	(Colombia) Fabiola Zuluaga	4–1 ret.
Loss	4.	14 October 2001	ITF Hallandale Beach, United States	Clay	(Colombia) Fabiola Zuluaga	6–3, 3–6, 4–3 ret.
Win	4.	1 June 2003	ITF Campobasso, Italy	Clay	(Russia) Nina Bratchikova	6–2, 6–2
Loss	5.	9 June 2003	Grado Tennis Cup, Italy	Clay	(Slovakia) Martina Suchá	1–6, 2–6
Win	5.	16 June 2003	ITF Gorizia, Italy	Clay	(Czech Republic) Michaela Paštiková	7–6^{(2)}, 6–4
Runner-up	6.	1 September 2003	ITF Fano, Italy	Clay	(Spain) Cristina Torrens Valero	3–6, 7–5, 3–6
Win	6.	29 June 2004	ITF Orbetello, Italy	Clay	(Ukraine) Alona Bondarenko	2–6, 6–2, 6–3
Loss	7.	24 June 2012	Open de Montpellier, France	Clay	(France) Séverine Beltrame	2–6, 6–7^{(4)}

=== Doubles (4–3) ===
Result	No.	Date	Tournament	Surface	Partner	Opponents	Score
Loss	1.	14 September 1998	ITF La Paz, Bolivia	Clay	(Colombia) Carolina Mayorga	(Paraguay) Laura Bernal (Uruguay) Daniela Olivera	5–7, 7–6^{(5)}, 1–6
Win	1.	24 January 2011	ITF Bucaramanga, Colombia	Clay	(Colombia) Viky Núñez Fuentes	(Brazil) Nathália Rossi (Slovakia) Zuzana Zlochová	7–6^{(3)}, 6–1
Loss	2.	25 July 2011	ITF Bad Saulgau, Germany	Clay	(Colombia) Mariana Duque Mariño	(Croatia) Maria Abramović (Italy) Nicole Clerico	3–6, 7–5, [7–10]
Win	2.	17 January 2012	ITF Plantation, United States	Clay	(France) Laura Thorpe	(United States) Jessica Pegula (United States) Ahsha Rolle	6–4, 6–2
Win	3.	22 October 2012	Internationaux de Poitiers, France	Hard	(Bosnia and Herzegovina) Mervana Jugić-Salkić	(France) Stéphanie Foretz Gacon (Germany) Tatjana Maria	6–4, 5–7, [10–4]
Win	4.	29 October 2012	Open Nantes Atlantique, France	Hard	(Bosnia and Herzegovina) Mervana Jugić-Salkić	(Czech Republic) Petra Cetkovská (Czech Republic) Renata Voráčová	6–4, 6–4
Loss	3.	12 May 2013	Open de Cagnes-sur-Mer, France	Clay	(Brazil) Teliana Pereira	(United States) Vania King (Netherlands) Arantxa Rus	6–4, 5–7, [8–10]

== Performance timelines ==
Key
W	F	SF	QF	#R	RR	Q#	DNQ	A	NH

(W) winner; (F) finalist; (SF) semifinalist; (QF) quarterfinalist; (#R) rounds 4, 3, 2, 1; (RR) round-robin stage; (Q#) qualification round; (DNQ) did not qualify; (A) absent; (NH) not held; (SR) strike rate (events won / competed); (W–L) win–loss record.

=== Singles ===
Tournament	1999	2000	2001	2002	2003	2004	2005	2006	2007	2008	2009	2010	2011	2012	2013	SR	W-L
Grand Slam tournaments
Australian Open	A	A	A	A	Q1	Q2	1R	2R	1R	2R	Q2	A	A	A	A	0 / 4	2–4
French Open	A	Q2	2R	Q1	A	1R	2R	2R	2R	1R	Q2	Q1	A	A	Q1	0 / 6	4–6
Wimbledon	A	A	1R	Q1	A	1R	1R	1R	1R	1R	A	Q1	A	A	Q1	0 / 6	0–6
US Open	A	Q1	1R	Q1	1R	1R	2R	1R	1R	Q1	Q1	Q3	A	Q3	Q3	0 / 6	1–6
Olympic Games
Summer Olympics	NH	A	NH			1R	NH			A	NH			A	NH	0 / 1	0–1
Premier Mandatory
Indian Wells	A	A	A	A	A	Q1	Q1	2R	1R	1R	A	A	A	A	A	0 / 3	1–3
Miami	A	A	Q1	Q1	A	Q1	4R	1R	2R	Q1	A	A	A	A	A	0 / 3	4–3
Beijing	A	A	A	A	A	Q2	A	1R	Q3	A	A	A	A	A	A	0 / 1	0–1
Premier 5
Doha	A	A	A	A	A	A	A	A	1R	A	Not Held		A	A	A	0 / 1	0–1
Rome	A	A	A	Q1	A	A	3R	2R	2R	Q2	A	A	A	A	A	0 / 3	4–3
Cincinnati	NH					A	A	A	1R	A	A	A	A	A	A	0 / 1	0–1
Premier
Charleston	A	A	1R	A	A	2R	A	QF	A	A	Q2	2R	A	Q1	Q1	0 / 4	5–4
San Diego	A	A	A	A	A	A	A	A	1R	NH		Q1	A	A	A	0 / 1	0–1
WTA International
Brisbane	A	A	A	A	A	A	A	A	QF	A	Q2	A	A	A	A	0 / 1	2–1
Auckland	A	A	A	A	A	Q1	A	1R	A	Q1	A	A	A	A	A	0 / 1	0–1
Bogotá	1R	2R	QF	SF	QF	QF	QF	QF	A	QF	1R	2R	QF	2R	1R	0 / 14	19–14
Acapulco	NH		Q2	A	A	A	QF	2R	A	Q1	A	2R	A	Q3	1R	0 / 4	4–4
Budapest	A	A	A	A	A	A	F	QF	A	A	A	2R	A	A	A	0 / 3	7–3
Istanbul	A	A	A	A	A	A	1R	QF	QF	A	A	A	A	A	A	0 / 3	4–3
Quebec	A	A	2R	A	A	A	A	A	1R	A	A	A	A	A	Q2	0 / 2	1–2
Barcelona	NH				A	A	A	A	1R	1R	A	A	A	A	NH	0 / 2	0–2
Seoul	A	A	A	A	A	2R	SF	2R	QF	A	A	A	A	Q3	A	0 / 4	7–4
Luxembourg	A	A	A	A	A	Q2	A	A	A	2R	1R	A	A	Q1	A	0 / 2	1–2
WTA 125s
Cali	NH								A	A	A	A	1R	1R	F	0 / 3	4–3
Year-end ranking	A	143	122	201	133	110	59	55	115	147	219	183	251	236	196	0 / 78	64-78

=== Doubles ===
Tournament	2001	2002	2003	2004	2005	2006	2007	2008	2009	2010	2011	2012	2013	SR	W-L
Grand Slam tournaments
Australian Open	A	A	A	A	A	2R	2R	A	A	A	A	A	A	0 / 2	2–2
French Open	A	A	A	A	2R	1R	A	1R	A	A	A	A	2R	0 / 4	2–4
Wimbledon	A	A	A	A	1R	A	A	3R	A	A	A	A	1R	0 / 3	2–3
US Open	A	A	A	A	1R	2R	A	1R	A	A	A	A	A	0 / 3	1–3
Olympic Games
Summer Olympics	NH			2R	NH			A	NH			A	NH	0 / 1	1–1
Premier 5
Doha	A	A	A	A	A	A	QF	A	NH		A	A	A	0 / 1	1–1
Rome	A	A	A	A	A	A	2R	A	A	A	A	A	2R	0 / 2	2–2
Cincinnati	NH			A	A	A	1R	A	A	A	A	A	A	0 / 1	0–1
WTA International
Bogotá	QF	QF	1R	A	QF	1R	A	1R	QF	1R	A	QF	1R	0 / 10	5–10
Acapulco	A	A	A	A	A	A	A	1R	A	A	A	A	F	0 / 2	3–2
Estoril	A	A	A	A	A	A	A	A	A	A	A	A	1R	0 / 1	0–1
Båstad	NH								A	A	A	W	A	1 / 0	4–0
Washington	NH										A	A	QF	0 / 1	1–1
Quebec	A	A	A	A	A	A	1R	A	A	A	A	A	1R	0 / 2	0–2
WTA 125s
Cali	NH						A	A	A	A	1R	QF	W	1 / 2	5–2
Year-end ranking	316	361	A	305	236	144	91	163	280	455	238	96	104	2 / 33	29–33

== Head-to-head record ==
Players who have been ranked world No. 1 are in boldface.

- **Martina Navratilova** - 0–1
- **Nadia Petrova** - 0–1
- **Serena Williams** - 0–1
