= Alexandra Dulgheru =

Romanian tennis player

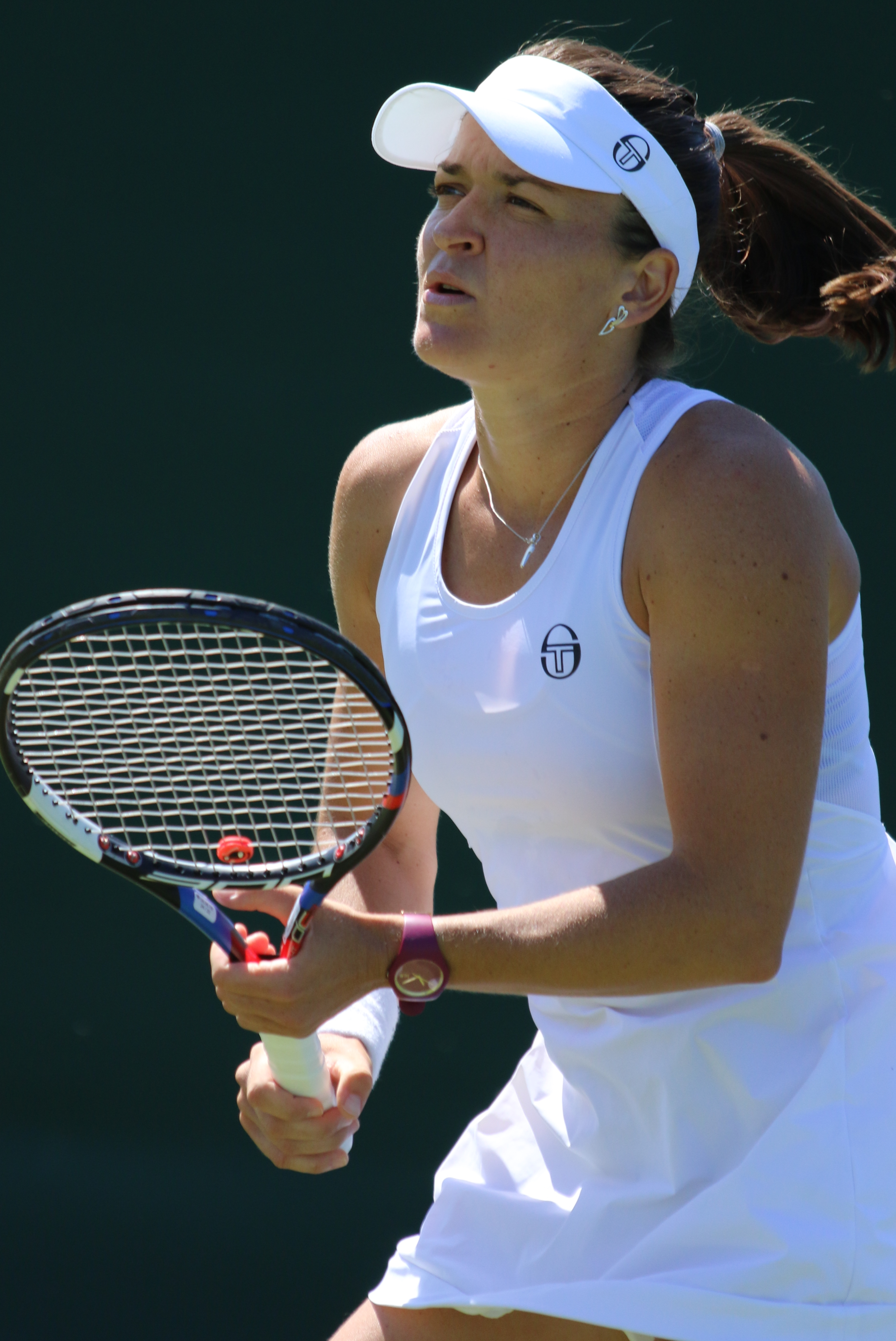
- Dulgheru at the 2018 Wimbledon qualifying
- Country (sports): Romania
- Born: 30 May 1989 (age 37) Bucharest, Socialist Republic of Romania
- Height: 1.72 m (5 ft 8 in)
- Turned pro: 5 May 2005
- Retired: (2021 last match)
- Plays: Right-handed (two-handed backhand)
- Coach: Martin Vilar
- Prize money: US$ 2,329,967

Singles
- Career record: 388–259
- Career titles: 2
- Highest ranking: No. 26 (11 April 2011)

Grand Slam singles results
- Australian Open: 2R (2016)
- French Open: 3R (2010)
- Wimbledon: 3R (2010)
- US Open: 3R (2010)

Doubles
- Career record: 86–100
- Career titles: 0 WTA, 3 ITF
- Highest ranking: No. 41 (4 July 2011)

Grand Slam doubles results
- Australian Open: 3R (2011)
- French Open: 3R (2011)
- Wimbledon: 1R (2010, 2015)
- US Open: 3R (2010)

Mixed doubles
- Career record: 2–2

Grand Slam mixed doubles results
- Australian Open: 1R (2011)
- Wimbledon: 2R (2010, 2011)
- US Open: 1R (2015)

Team competitions
- Fed Cup: 7–9

Alexandra Dulgheru (Romanian pronunciation: [alekˈsandra dulˈɡeru]; born 30 May 1989) is a former professional tennis player from Romania. On 11 April 2011, she achieved a career-high singles ranking of world No. 26. Her best ranking in doubles is No. 41, which she reached on 4 July 2011.

== Personal life ==
Her father Dumitru is a pilot, and her mother Doina is an airline coordinator. Her sister Bianca is an assistant hotel manager. Besides Romanian she speaks English and Spanish, and is studying economics at Bucharest Academy of Economic Studies.

== Career ==
Her best junior result came at the 2006 Wimbledon girls' championship, where she was defeated in the quarterfinals by Tamira Paszek. She also made the doubles final with Kristina Antoniychuk. They lost to Alisa Kleybanova and Anastasia Pavlyuchenkova. At the end of 2008, she was No. 346 in the WTA rankings.

=== 2009: First WTA Tour title ===
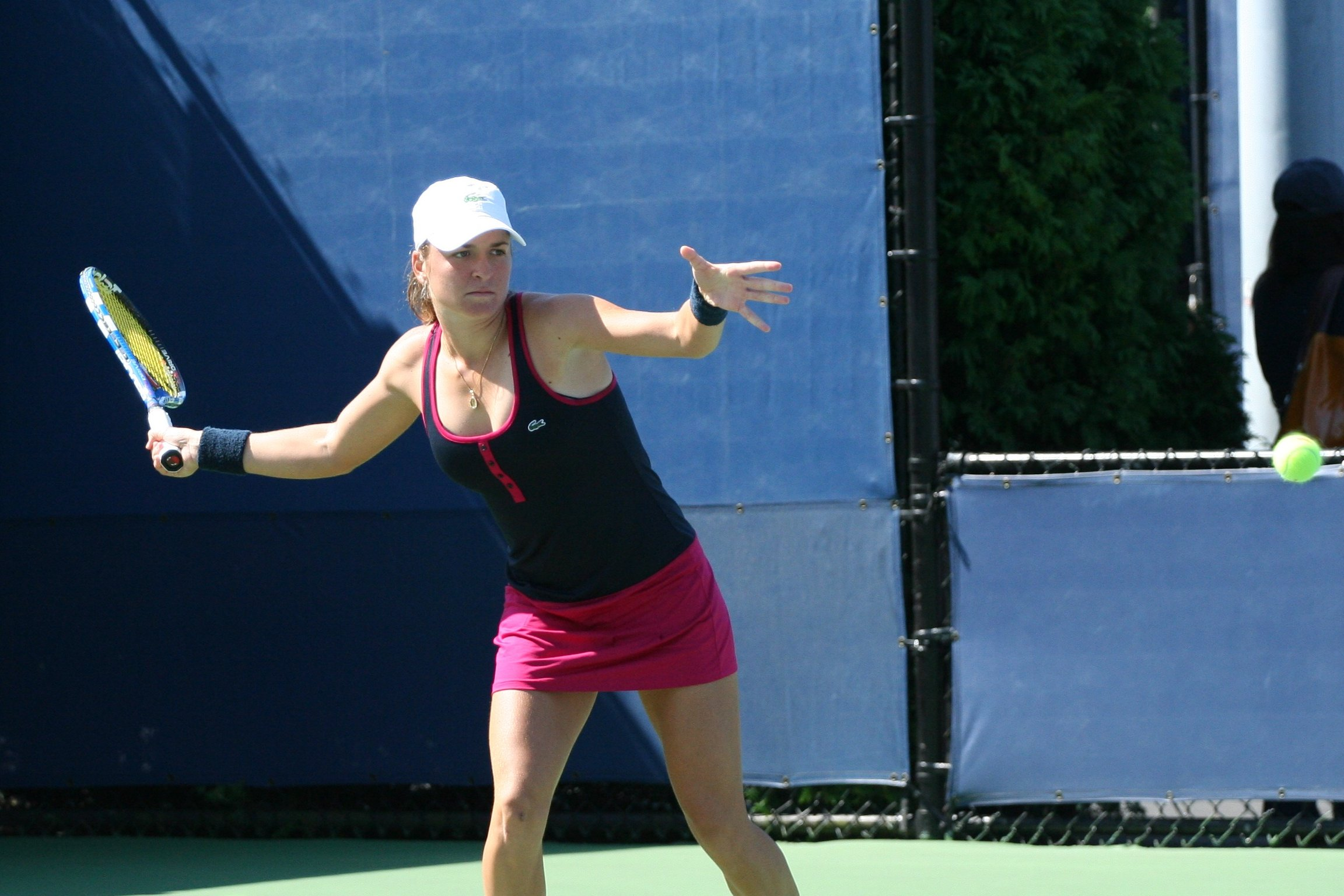
Dulgheru at the 2009 US Open

In April 2009, she finished runner-up to Kimiko Date-Krumm in a $75k tournament in Monzón. Two weeks later, she won a $25k tournament in Bari, where she defeated Sandra Záhlavová in the final.

She made her WTA Tour debut as a qualifier in the Warsaw Open where she defeated fellow Romanian qualifier Ágnes Szatmári in the first round. She followed that up with a two-sets win over 44th-ranked Sara Errani to advance to the quarterfinals, beating 95th-ranked Galina Voskoboeva. She then defeated world No. 36 and former world No. 5, Daniela Hantuchová, to reach her first WTA tournament final, in which she beat Alona Bondarenko in three sets.

Her next tournament was Prague Open where she lost in the opening round to Carla Suárez Navarro. In Bad Gastein, she suffered yet another opening-round exit at the hands of the fourth seeded Iveta Benešová.

In August 2009, she made her major debut at the US Open, losing in the first round to eighth seeded Victoria Azarenka.

At Linz, she won in the first round over Sybille Bammer in two sets, before losing to third seeded and eventual champion, Yanina Wickmayer. In the first round of the Luxembourg Open, she lost again to Wickmayer.

These results brought her, by the year end, to world No. 52 in the WTA rankings.

=== 2010: Reaching top 30 ===
At the first Grand Slam championship of the year, the Australian Open, Dulgheru entered both the singles and the doubles events, these being her first appearances at Melbourne. In singles, she lost in the first round to qualifier Yanina Wickmayer in three sets. In doubles, she teamed up with compatriot Edina Gallovits; they lost in the first round to American-Czech team of Carly Gullickson/Vladimíra Uhlířová, in three sets.

The first highlight of the year came at the Barcelona Open where Alexandra reached the semifinals. She defeated Sílvia Soler Espinosa, Sara Errani, Arantxa Parra Santonja, then lost in the semifinals to Roberta Vinci, in a three-setter.

Dulgheru got her first top-ten win at the Italian Open against world No. 3, Dinara Safina, in three sets. In the third round, she lost to Nadia Petrova.

At the Madrid Open, she defeated Elena Dementieva in the second round for her second top-ten win. In round three, she lost to Lucie Šafářová in three sets.

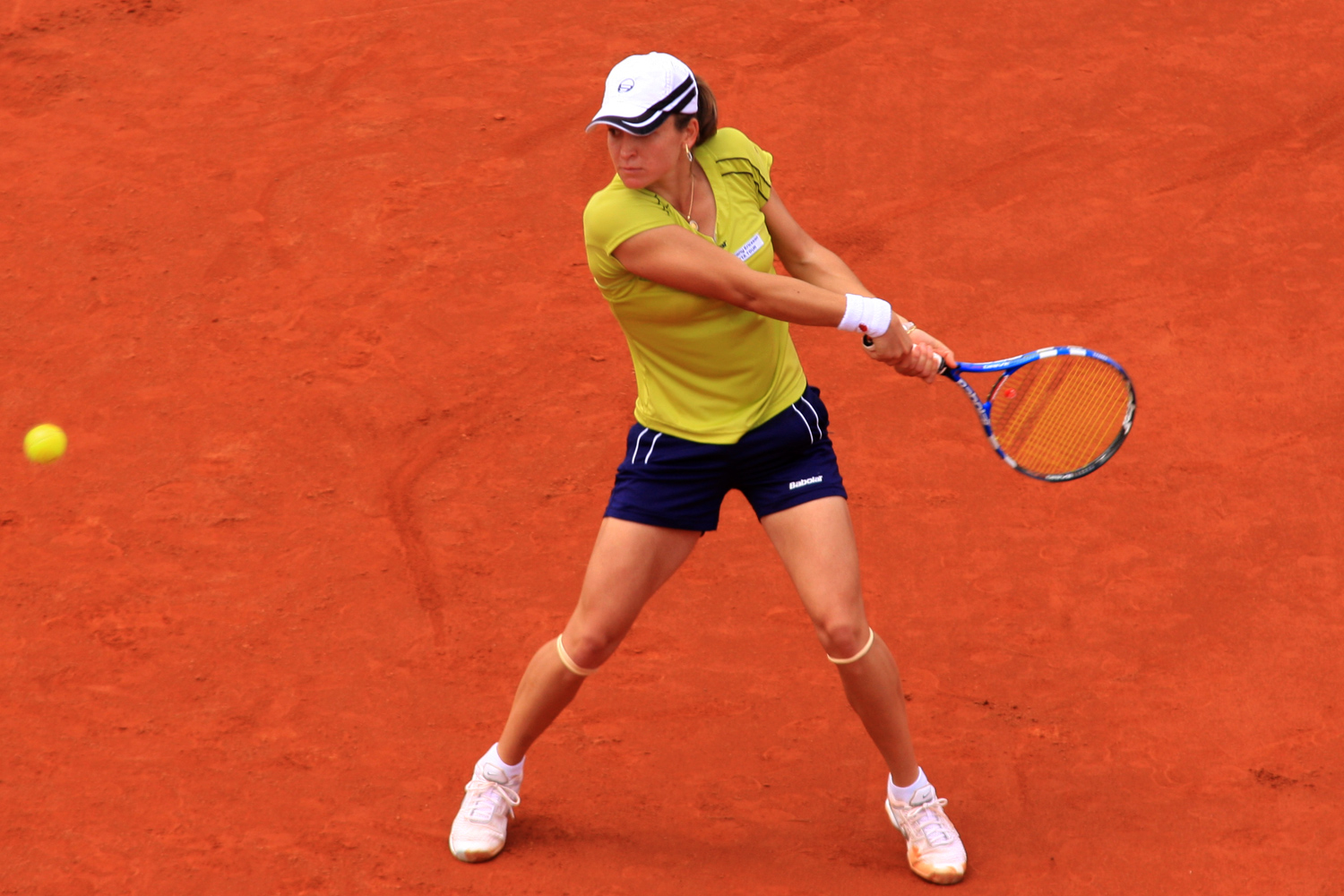
Alexandra Dulgheru at the 2010 Polsat Warsaw Open

She won her second WTA Premier title and second overall at the Warsaw Open where she was the defending champion. In the first rounds, she won over Kateryna Bondarenko and Timea Bacsinszky, in straight sets. In the quarterfinal, she defeated Bulgarian qualifier Tsvetana Pironkova. In her semifinal match, she won over third seeded Li Na. In the final, she beat Zheng Jie, in straight sets.

==== Grand Slam tournament success and injury ====
Playing at the French Open for the first time, she defeated Lucie Hradecká in the first round, and Timea Bacsinszky in the second. She then lost to third seeded Caroline Wozniacki, in straight sets.

In doubles, she teamed up with Alberta Brianti. They defeated the team of Jill Craybas/Anastasia Pavlyuchenkova in the first round in straight sets. They eventually lost the match against fifth seeds Gisela Dulko and Flavia Pennetta.

Another semifinal followed at the Rosmalen Open. For the first time in her career she was a seeded player (fifth seed), and following wins over Julie Coin, Alla Kudryavtseva and Yaroslava Shvedova, Alexandra eventually lost in the semifinals to Justine Henin.

A first time appearance at Wimbledon saw her entering there all three possible draws: singles, doubles and mixed doubles. In singles, as the 31st seed, she defeated in the first round Japanese veteran Kimiko Date-Krumm, in three sets. She faced in the second qualifier Romina Oprandi who she swept through in straight sets. Her victorious run ended in the third round when she easily lost to Estonian qualifier Kaia Kanepi. In the doubles, she teamed up with Alberta Brianti. They lost in the first round to American-Kazakh team and eventual Wimbledon champions, Vania King and Yaroslava Shvedova. In the mixed-doubles section, she teamed up with Spaniard David Marrero.

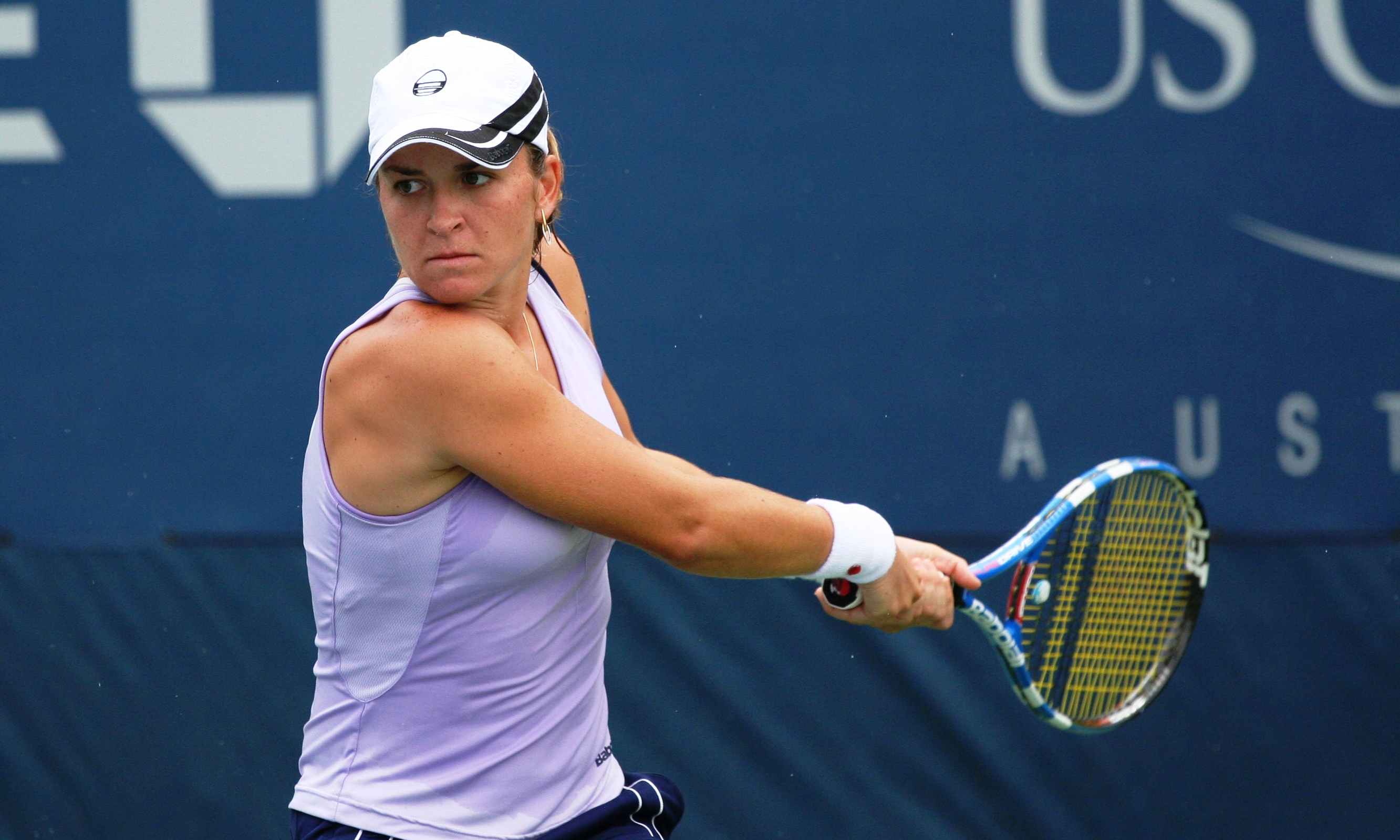
Dulgheru at the 2010 US Open

At the Paris Indoor Grand Prix, second seeded Alexandra reached her fourth semifinal of the year. She won over Sandra Záhlavová, Anna Chakvetadze and Anastasija Sevastova being defeated in the semifinals by Ágnes Szávay, in three sets.

Following good form, Alexandra was second seeded at Prague Open too. In the first round, she defeated Tathiana Garbin, in three sets. Soon after the victory, she felt pain in her right knee and had to withdraw from the tournament ahead of her second-round match with Polona Hercog. The injury held her away from tennis for one month.

In August 2010, she returned to the courts preparing for the US Open Series. She entered the Cincinnati Open where she lost in the first round to Alisa Kleybanova.

She finally found her game at the US Open where she entered both singles and doubles events. In singles, being the 25th seed she won in the first round over French Julie Coin in straight sets. She then faced in the second round Sofia Arvidsson whom she defeated also in straight sets. Her run came to an end in the third round when she lost to seventh seeded Vera Zvonareva, in two sets. In the doubles event, partnering Magdaléna Rybáriková, Alexandra and her partner surprised in the first round third seeded Spanish duo consisting of Nuria Llagostera Vives and María José Martínez Sánchez, in a close three-setter. In the second round, Dulgheru and her partner defeated Edina Gallovits and Klaudia Jans in straight sets. Their run was stopped by 14th seeded Russian duo of Elena Vesnina/Vera Zvonareva who won in two sets.

At the end of the year, she was ranked No. 29 in the world.

=== 2011: High ranked 26th ===
Dulgheru started off the year losing in the first round of both of her first two tournaments in straight sets. Her poor form continued at the Australian Open losing to Ayumi Morita. Then in Miami, Dulgheru had a very good tournament. She won in the second round over Chanelle Scheepers, and in the third over Johanna Larsson. In the fourth round, she beat Peng Shuai, also in straight sets. In the quarterfinals Dulgheru faced Sharapova, and they played a marathon match. After splitting the first two sets, at 5–4 Dulgheru served for the match, but Sharapova got a break and then won the match in the third set tiebreak. Dulgheru's ranking rose to No. 26, her best ranking so far.

At the US Open, Dulgheru upset recent Wimbledon champion and fifth seed Petra Kvitová in the first round before losing in the second round to compatriot Monica Niculescu, in straight sets.

=== 2012: Injury and fall out of top 200 ===
Ranked No. 65 at the beginning of the year, Dulgheru won her only (ITF) title of the year in Cali, defending Mandy Minella in three sets.

After consecutively losing openers in Bogotá, in Monterrey and in Acapulco, she played in the first round at Indian Wells with Irina Falconi, but after winning the first set, she retired in the second set with a knee injury.

She came back on courts after eight months in November in a couple of ITF tournaments, yet with poor results. By the end of the year she was ranked No. 233.

=== 2013: Slowly climbing back ===
After making semifinals and then becoming winner in two ITF Circuit events in Antalya, Alexandra returned to the WTA Tour with a protected ranking in Indian Wells and defeated qualifier Michelle Larcher de Brito, before losing in the second round to 32nd seeded Peng Shuai. Next week, in Miami, she lost her opener to Anabel Medina Garrigues.

She received a wildcard for the qualifying tournament in Madrid, and she did qualify, but lost to eventual finalist Maria Sharapova in the first round. Still as a qualifier at the Palermo Ladies Open, she had to retire in the first round with Lourdes Domínguez Lino due to right toe injury.

In Båstad, she started better, defeating Caroline Garcia in two sets, but she then lost to Virginie Razzano in the second round. In Toronto, she had to play the qualifying matches again, and she qualified for the first round, where she lost to Magdaléna Rybáriková in straight sets. In Cincinnati, she did not manage to qualify for the main draw, losing again to Sofia Arvidsson in the second qualifying round.

With a protected ranking she received an entrance directly in the first round at the US Open, and first she defeated Varvara Lepchenko in a tough three-setter, before losing to 13th seeded Ana Ivanovic.

Before playing some smaller ITF tournaments, she ended her WTA Tour in Seoul, where she won in straight sets against wildcard Han Sung-hee, before losing in the second round to Lara Arruabarrena in three sets.

At the end of the year, Alexandra was ranked 164th in the WTA rankings.

=== 2014: Return to top 100 ===
After inconsistent results on the WTA Tour, Dulgheru did very well in ITF tournaments, winning in Marseille and Dubai, and making semifinals in Campinas. The points she gathered made her climb up to No. 83 in the rankings by the end of year.

=== 2015: Finalist in Kuala Lumpur and top 50 again ===
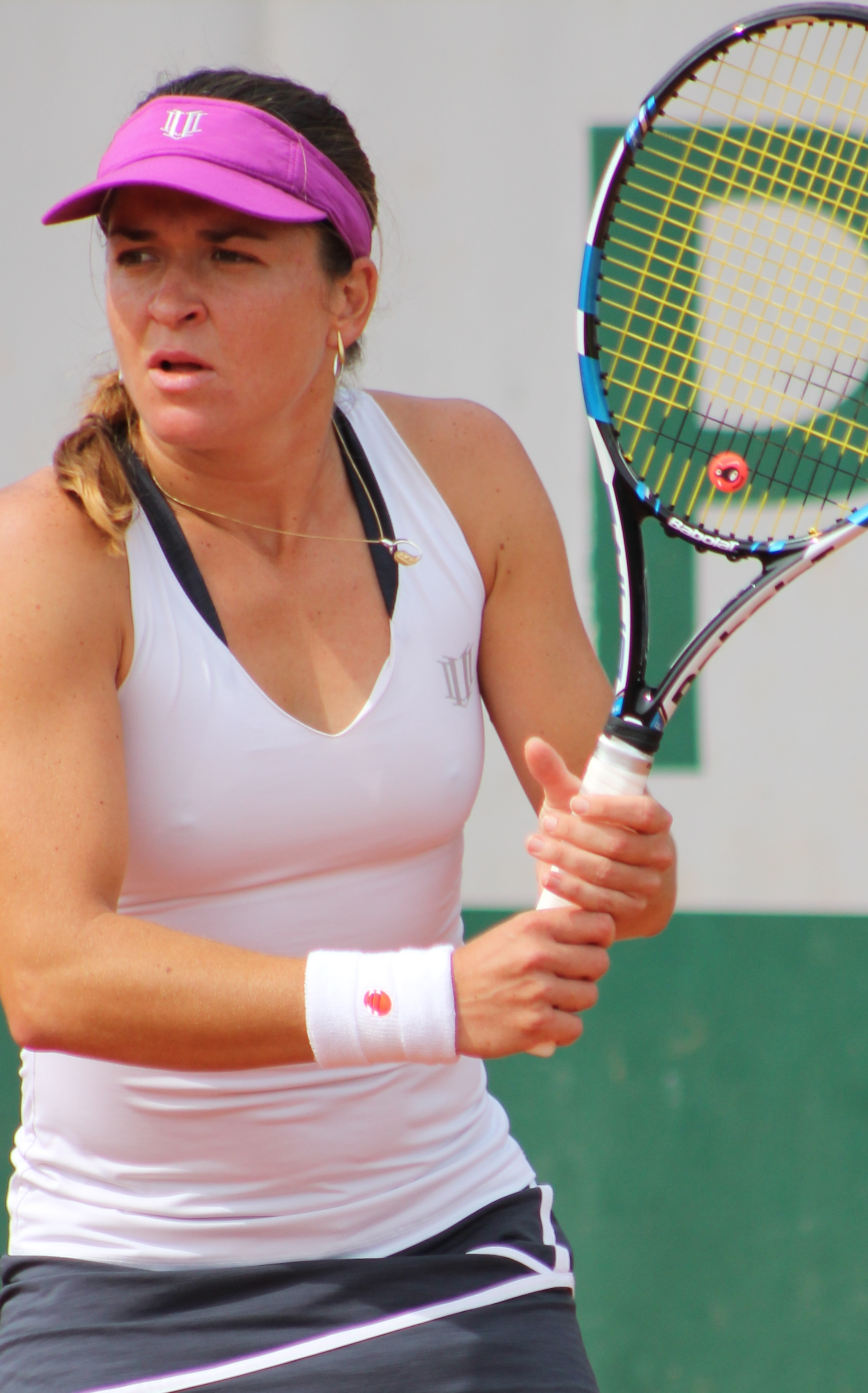
Dulgheru at the 2015 French Open

Dulgheru started her season at the Shenzhen Open. She lost in the first round to Zheng Saisai. In Sydney, she was defeated in the second round of qualifying by Kristina Mladenovic. At the Australian Open, she lost in the first round to Australian Jarmila Gajdošová.

In February, Dulgheru reached the final round of qualifying at the Dubai Championships where she was defeated by Mirjana Lučić-Baroni. Getting past qualifying in Qatar, she retired during her second-round match against third seed Caroline Wozniacki due to an upper respiratory tract infection. After she recovered from the infection, she made it to the third career final at the Malaysian Open, before losing to top seed Caroline Wozniacki. This brought her to be 72nd in the WTA rankings. Following this performance, she entered the Miami Open and qualified for the event but lost in the first round to Elena Vesnina.

Dulgheru began her clay-court season in Charleston where she again lost in the first round to Ajla Tomljanović. She then played for Romania at the 2015 Fed Cup World Group play-offs and won both matches against Françoise Abanda and world No. 7, Eugenie Bouchard. Dulgheru then received a wildcard for the Madrid Open but retired in the third set against former French Open champion, Ana Ivanovic, after taking the first set.

Dulgheru had another great tournament at the Premier 5 Italian Open. She qualified for the event and defeated Misaki Doi, 12th seed Lucie Šafářová and eighth seed Ekaterina Makarova (her fourth career top-ten win) but lost to world No. 2, Simona Halep, in the quarterfinals. Her performance brought her back into top 50.

== Performance timelines ==
Key
W	F	SF	QF	#R	RR	Q#	P#	DNQ	A	Z#	PO	G	S	B	NMS	NTI	P	NH

(W) winner; (F) finalist; (SF) semifinalist; (QF) quarterfinalist; (#R) rounds 4, 3, 2, 1; (RR) round-robin stage; (Q#) qualification round; (P#) preliminary round; (DNQ) did not qualify; (A) absent; (Z#) Davis/Fed Cup Zonal Group (with number indication) or (PO) play-off; (G) gold, (S) silver or (B) bronze Olympic/Paralympic medal; (NMS) not a Masters tournament; (NTI) not a Tier I tournament; (P) postponed; (NH) not held; (SR) strike rate (events won / competed); (W–L) win–loss record.
To avoid confusion and double counting, these charts are updated at the conclusion of a tournament or when the player's participation has ended.

Only main-draw results in WTA Tour, Grand Slam tournaments, Fed Cup/Billie Jean King Cup and Olympic Games are included in win–loss records.

=== Singles ===
Tournament	2009	2010	2011	2012	2013	2014	2015	2016	2017	2018	2019	...	2021	SR	W–L	Win%
Grand Slam tournaments
Australian Open	A	1R	1R	1R	A	Q2	1R	2R	A	Q3	A		A	0 / 5	1–5	17%
French Open	A	3R	2R	A	A	Q2	2R	1R	Q1	2R	A		Q2	0 / 5	5–5	50%
Wimbledon	A	3R	2R	A	A	Q2	1R	A	A	2R	A		Q1	0 / 4	4–4	50%
US Open	1R	3R	2R	A	2R	2R	1R	A	A	Q3	A		A	0 / 6	5–6	45%
Win–loss	0–1	6–4	3–4	0–1	1–1	1–1	1–4	1–2	0–0	2–2	0–0		0–0	0 / 20	15–20	43%
WTA 1000
Dubai / Qatar Open	A	2R	2R	A	A	Q2	Q2	A	A	A	Q1		A	0 / 2	2–2	50%
Indian Wells Open	A	2R	2R	1R	2R	A	A	1R	A	A	A		A	0 / 5	2–5	29%
Miami Open	A	2R	QF	A	1R	A	1R	1R	A	A	A		A	0 / 5	4–5	44%
Madrid Open	A	3R	1R	A	1R	Q1	1R	A	A	A	A		A	0 / 4	2–4	33%
Italian Open	A	3R	1R	A	A	A	QF	A	A	A	A		A	0 / 3	5–3	63%
Canadian Open	Q1	1R	A	A	1R	A	A	A	A	A	A		A	0 / 2	0–2	0%
Cincinnati Open	Q1	1R	A	A	Q2	Q1	Q1	A	A	A	A		A	0 / 1	0–1	0%
Pan Pacific / Wuhan Open	A	2R	1R	A	A	A	1R	A	A	A	A	NH		0 / 3	1–3	25%
China Open	A	2R	1R	A	A	A	1R	A	A	A	A	NH		0 / 3	1–3	25%
Career statistics
Tournaments	6	26	21	7	8	6	17	9	1	4	0		3	Career total: 108		
Titles	1	1	0	0	0	0	0	0	0	0	0		0	Career total: 2		
Finals	1	1	0	0	0	0	1	0	0	0	0		0	Career total: 3		
Overall win–loss	6–5	33–24	14–21	1–7	4–8	5–6	12–17	3–9	2–1	3–4	0–3		0–0	2 / 108	83–105	44%
Year-end ranking	51	29	70	238	157	105	57	280	193	148	823		359	$2,329,967		

=== Doubles ===
Tournament	2009	2010	2011	2012	2013	2014	2015	2016	...	2021	W–L
Australian Open	A	1R	3R	2R	A	A	A	1R		A	3–4
French Open	A	2R	3R	A	A	A	2R	A		A	4–3
Wimbledon	A	1R	A	A	A	A	1R	A		A	0–2
US Open	1R	3R	1R	A	1R	A	A	A		A	2–4
Win–loss	0–1	3–4	4–3	1–1	0–1	0–0	1–2	0–1		0–0	9–13

== WTA Tour finals ==
=== Singles: 3 (2 titles, 1 runner-up) ===
Legend WTA 500 (2–0) WTA 250 (0–1)	Finals by surface Hard (0–1) Clay (2–0)	Finals by setting Outdoor (2–1)

Result	W–L	Date	Tournament	Tier	Surface	Partner	Opponents	Score
Win	1–0	May 2009	Warsaw Open, Poland	Premier (Note: The WTA Premier tournaments were reclassified as WTA 500 tournaments in 2021.)	Clay	(Ukraine) Alona Bondarenko	7–6^{(7–3)}, 3–6, 6–0	
Win	2–0	May 2010	Warsaw Open, Poland (2)	Premier	Clay	(China) Zheng Jie	6–3, 6–4	
Loss	2–1	Mar 2015	Malaysian Open, Malaysia	International (Note: The WTA International tournaments were reclassified as WTA 250 tournaments in 2021.)	Hard	(Denmark) Caroline Wozniacki	6–4, 2–6, 1–6	

=== Doubles: 2 (2 runner-ups) ===
Legend WTA 500 (–) WTA 250 (0–2)	Finals by surface Hard (0–1) Clay (0–1)	Finals by setting Outdoor (0–2)

Result	W–L	Date	Tournament	Tier	Surface	Partner	Opponents	Score
Loss	0–1	Oct 2010	Tashkent Open, Uzbekistan	International	Hard	(Slovakia) Magdaléna Rybáriková	(Russia) Alexandra Panova (Belarus) Tatiana Poutchek	3–6, 4–6
Loss	0–2	Jul 2013	Båstad Open, Sweden	International	Clay	(Italy) Flavia Pennetta	(Spain) Anabel Medina Garrigues (Czech Republic) Klára Zakopalová	1–6, 4–6

== ITF Circuit finals ==
Legend
$100,000 tournaments
$75,000 tournaments
$60,000 tournaments
$25,000 tournaments
$10/15,000 tournaments

=== Singles: 19 (11 titles, 8 runner-ups) ===
Result	W–L	Date	Tournament	Tier	Surface	Opponent	Score
Win	1–0	May 2005	ITF Bucharest, Romania	10,000	Clay	(Romania) Liana Balaci	6–2, 6–2
Loss	1–1	May 2005	ITF Pitești, Romania	10,000	Clay	(Romania) Anamaria-Alexandra Sere	5–7, 2–6
Loss	1–2	Nov 2006	ITF Cairo, Egypt	10,000	Clay	(Romania) Liana Balaci	1–6, 1–6
Loss	1–3	Jul 2007	Bella Cup, Poland	25,000	Clay	(Switzerland) Stefanie Vögele	2–6, 6–4, 5–7
Loss	1–4	Aug 2007	Open Romania Ladies	25,000	Clay	(Romania) Sorana Cîrstea	4–6, 3–6
Loss	1–5	Apr 2009	ITF Monzón, Spain	75,000	Hard	(Japan) Kimiko Date-Krumm	5–7, 2–6
Win	2–5	Apr 2009	ITF Bari, Italy	25,000	Clay	(Czech Republic) Sandra Záhlavová	6–4, 6–4
Win	3–5	Sep 2009	Sofia Cup, Bulgaria	100,000	Clay	(Italy) Tathiana Garbin	6–7^{(4)}, 7–5, 6–1
Loss	3–6	Sep 2009	Open de Saint-Malo, France	100,000	Clay	(Spain) Arantxa Parra Santonja	4–6, 3–6
Win	4–6	Oct 2009	ITF Jounieh Open, Lebanon	75,000	Clay	(Slovakia) Zuzana Kučová	3–6, 6–3, 6–4
Win	5–6	Feb 2012	Copa Bionaire, Colombia	100,000	Clay	(Luxembourg) Mandy Minella	6–3, 1–6, 6–3
Win	6–6	Jan 2013	ITF Antalya, Turkey	10,000	Clay	(Hungary) Réka Luca Jani	6–2, 6–2
Win	7–6	Jun 2014	Open de Marseille, France	100,000	Clay	(Sweden) Johanna Larsson	6–3, 7–5
Win	8–6	Nov 2014	Dubai Tennis Challenge, UAE	75,000	Hard	(Japan) Kimiko Date-Krumm	6–3, 6–4
Win	9–6	Jul 2015	Contrexéville Open, France	100,000	Clay	(Kazakhstan) Yulia Putintseva	6–3, 1–6, 7–5
Loss	9–7	Jan 2017	ITF Hammamet, Tunisia	15,000	Clay	(Spain) María Teresa Torró Flor	3–6, ret.
Win	10–7	Jun 2017	Open de Montpellier, France	25,000	Clay	(France) Shérazad Reix	6–2, 6–2
Win	11–7	Aug 2017	Hódmezővásárhely Open, Hungary	25,000	Clay	(Ukraine) Ganna Poznikhirenko	7–5, 6–2
Loss	11–8	May 2021	Open Saint-Gaudens, France	60,000	Clay	(France) Clara Burel	2–6, 6–1, 2–6

=== Doubles: 9 (3 titles, 6 runner-ups) ===
Result	W–L	Date	Tournament	Tier	Surface	Partner	Opponents	Score
Loss	0–1	Jun 2005	ITF Bucharest, Romania	10,000	Clay	(Romania) Mihaela Moldovan	(Romania) Corina-Claudia Corduneanu (Romania) Diana Enache	2–2 ret.
Loss	0–2	May 2006	ITF Antalya, Turkey	10,000	Clay	(France) Claire de Gubernatis	(Georgia (country)) Margalita Chakhnashvili (Turkey) İpek Şenoğlu	4–6, 3–6
Loss	0–3	Sep 2006	ITF Guadalajara, Mexico	10,000	Clay	(Mexico) Valeria Pulido-Velasco	(Argentina) Betina Jozami (Mexico) Daniela Múñoz Gallegos	5–7, 4–6
Win	1–3	Nov 2006	ITF Cairo, Egypt	10,000	Clay	(Netherlands) Marcella Koek	(South Africa) Tegan Edwards (Ukraine) Oksana Pavlova	6–3, 6–2
Win	2–3	Nov 2006	ITF Cairo, Egypt	10,000	Clay	(Netherlands) Marcella Koek	(Austria) Stefanie Haidner (Bulgaria) Biljana Pavlova	7–6^{(4)}, 3–6, 7–6^{(5)}
Loss	2–4	Mar 2007	ITF Rome, Italy	10,000	Clay	(Serbia) Vojislava Lukić	(Italy) Giulia Gatto-Monticone (Belarus) Darya Kustova	7–5, 1–6, 2–6
Loss	2–5	Sep 2007	ITF Granada, Spain	25,000	Hard	(Romania) Monica Niculescu	(Spain) Marta Marrero (Spain) María José Martínez Sánchez	4–6, 1–6
Win	3–5	Apr 2010	ITF Monzón, Spain	75,000	Hard	(Thailand) Tamarine Tanasugarn	(Indonesia) Yayuk Basuki (United States) Riza Zalameda	6–2, 6–0
Loss	3–6	Dec 2011	Dubai Tennis Challenge, United Arab Emirates	75,000	Hard	(Uzbekistan) Akgul Amanmuradova	(Russia) Nina Bratchikova (Croatia) Darija Jurak	4–6, 6–3, [6–10]

== Wins over top-10 players ==
#	Player	Rank	Event	Surface	Round	Score
2010
1.	(Russia) Dinara Safina	No. 3	Italian Open, Italy	Clay	3R	6–4, 6–7^{(5–7)}, 6–1
2.	(Russia) Elena Dementieva	No. 7	Madrid Open, Spain	Clay	3R	6–1, 3–6, 7–5
2011
3.	(Czech Republic) Petra Kvitová	No. 6	US Open, United States	Hard	1R	7–6^{(7–3)}, 6–3
2015
4.	(Canada) Eugenie Bouchard	No. 7	Fed Cup, Canada	Hard	Play-off	6–4, 6–4
5.	(Russia) Ekaterina Makarova	No. 8	Italian Open, Italy	Clay	3R	6–4, 6–3
