= Tina Nadine Smith =

Australian tennis player (born 2002)

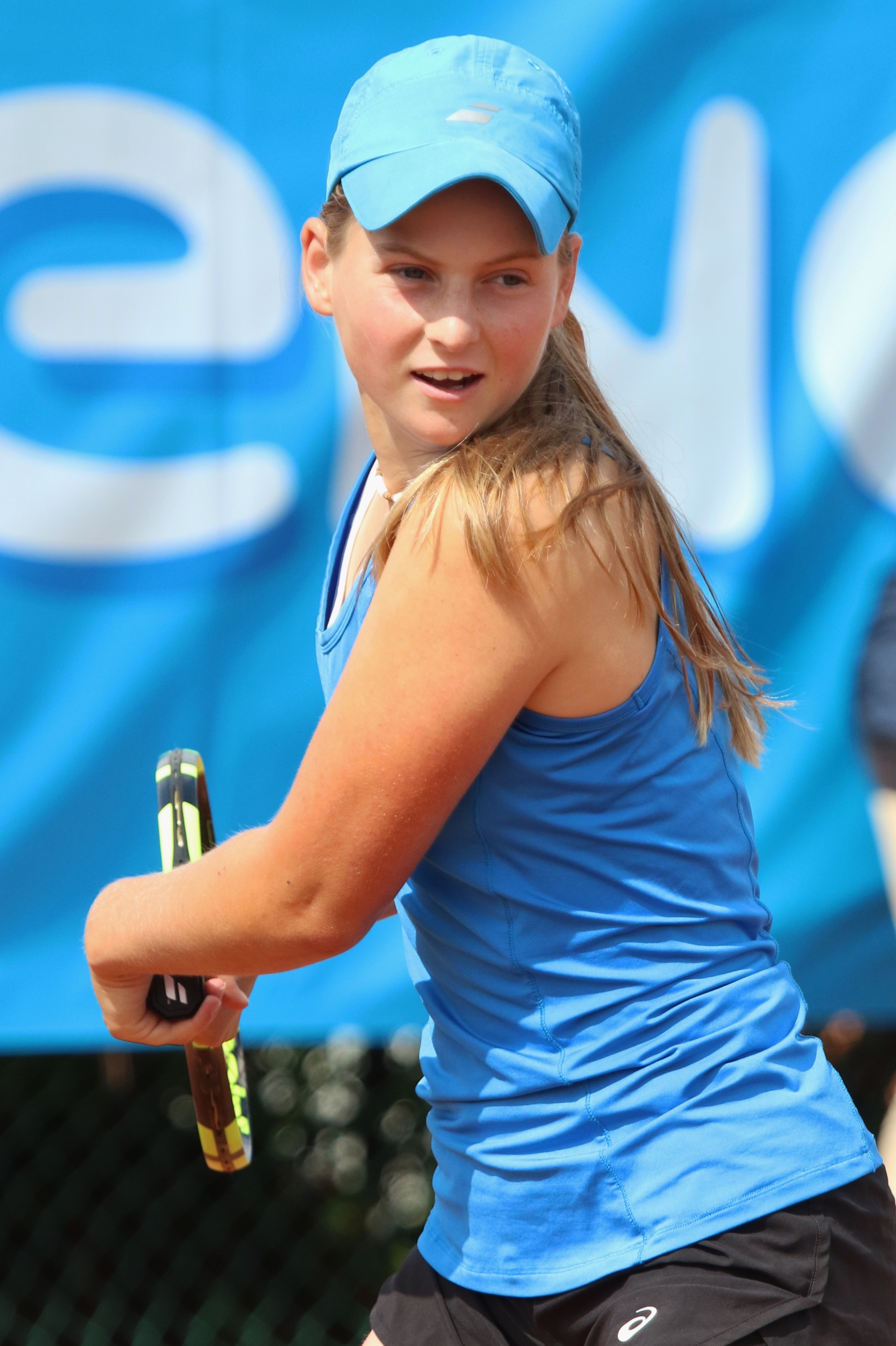
- Smith in 2021
- Country (sports): Australia
- Residence: Meggen, Switzerland
- Born: 12 June 2002 (age 24)
- Plays: Left (two-handed backhand)
- Coach: Roland Burtscher
- Prize money: $183,508

Singles
- Career record: 205–161
- Career titles: 3 ITF
- Highest ranking: No. 266 (23 December 2024)
- Current ranking: No. 618 (21 September 2026)

Grand Slam singles results
- Australian Open: Q2 (2026)

Doubles
- Career record: 39–61
- Career titles: 2 ITF
- Highest ranking: No. 442 (24 November 2025)
- Current ranking: No. 704 (21 September 2026)
- Last updated on: 22 September 2026.

Tina Nadine Smith (born 12 June 2002) is an inactive Australian tennis player. She has a career-high WTA ranking of 266 in singles, achieved on 23 December 2024. On 24 September 2025, she peaked at No. 442 in the doubles rankings. Smith has won two singles titles and two doubles titles on the ITF World Tour.

== Career ==
Smith made her WTA Tour main-draw debut at the 2022 Adelaide International 2 where she partnered with Annerly Poulos in the doubles competition.

She qualified for the WTA 125 2024 Cali Open and reached the semifinals with wins over Aliona Bolsova, third seed Robin Montgomery and Leyre Romero Gormaz. Her run was ended in the last four by second seed and eventual champion, Irina-Camelia Begu.

== Personal life ==
Smith lives in Meggen, Switzerland, and has dual Swiss-Australian citizenship.

== ITF Circuit finals ==
=== Singles: 8 (3 titles, 5 runner-ups) ===
Legend W50 tournaments (0–1) W35 tournaments (2–2) W15 tournaments (1–2)	Finals by surface Hard (0–2) Clay (3–2) Grass (0–1)

Result	W–L	Date	Tournament	Tier	Surface	Opponent	Score
Loss	0–1	Sep 2019	ITF Johannesburg, South Africa	W15	Hard	(South Africa) Chanel Simmonds	0–6, 1–6
Loss	0–2	Jul 2021	ITF Cairo, Egypt	W15	Clay	(Spain) Leyre Romero Gormaz	5–7, 6–7^{(4)}
Win	1–2	Aug 2021	ITF Cairo, Egypt	W15	Clay	(Italy) Diletta Cherubini	6–0, 6–2
Loss	1–3	Jan 2024	Pune Open, India	W50	Hard	(Japan) Moyuka Uchijima	4–6, 0–6
Loss	1–4	Mar 2024	ITF Mildura, Australia	W35	Grass	(Australia) Maddison Inglis	4–6, 1–6
Loss	1–5	Aug 2024	Verbier Open, Switzerland	W35	Clay	(Germany) Lara Schmidt	4–6, 5–7
Win	2–5	Aug 2025	Verbier Open, Switzerland	W35	Clay	(Switzerland) Alina Granwehr	6–3, 6–4
Win	3–5	Aug 2025	Verbier Open, Switzerland	W35	Clay	(France) Tiphanie Lemaître	5–7, 6–3, 7–5

=== Doubles: 2 (2 titles) ===
Legend W35 tournaments (1–0) W15 tournaments (1–0)	Finals by surface Clay (2–0)

Result	W–L	Date	Tournament	Tier	Surface	Partner	Opponents	Score
Win	1–0	Oct 2019	ITF Bogotá, Colombia	W15	Clay	(Italy) Alessandra Simone	(Brazil) Marcela Guimarães Bueno (United States) Sierra Stone	6–4, 6–1
Win	2–0	Aug 2025	Verbier Open, Switzerland	W35	Clay	(France) Tiphanie Lemaître	(Bulgaria) Rositsa Dencheva (Poland) Monika Stankiewicz	6–7^{(3)}, 6–3, [10–5]
