= Copa Bionaire =

Cali Open

WTA 125
- Location: Cali; Colombia
- Venue: Club Campestre de Cali
- Category: WTA 125
- Surface: Red clay / Outdoors
- Draw: 32M/7Q/8D
- Prize money: $115,000

Current champions (2026)
- Singles: (Spain) Leyre Romero Gormaz
- Doubles: (United States) Anna Rogers; (United States) Allura Zamarripa

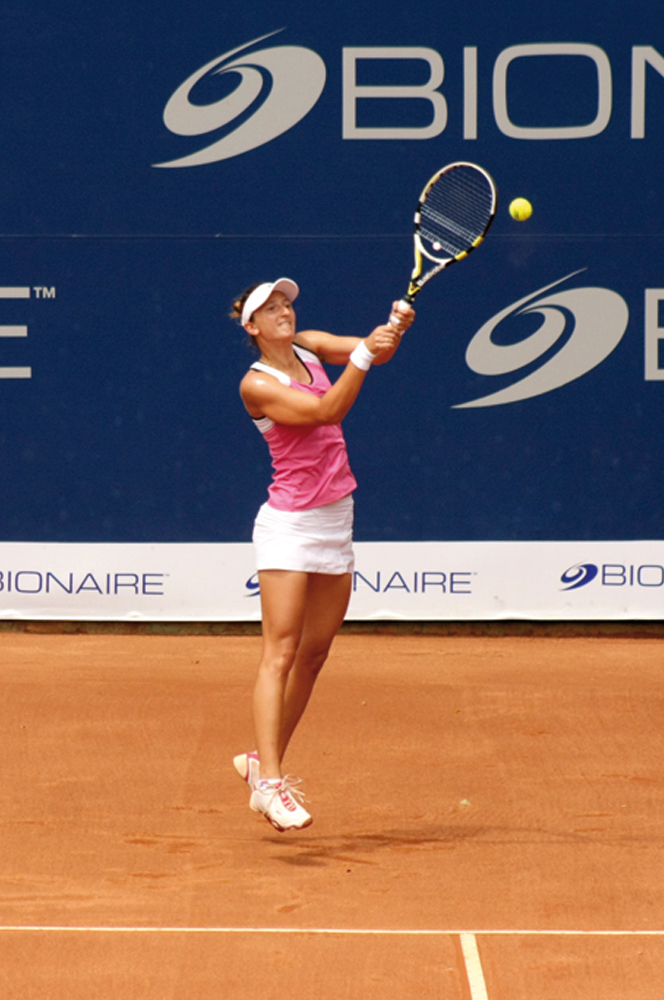
Romanian Irina-Camelia Begu lifted both singles and doubles champions' trophies in 2011

The Cali Open (formerly Copa Oster and Copa Bionaire) is a tournament for female professional tennis players played on outdoor clay courts. The event is classified as a WTA 125s tournament. It was held annually in Cali, Colombia, from 2008 to 2013. The first edition of the tournament was held in Bogotá in 2007. After a ten-year hiatus, the tournament returned to the WTA Challenger Circuit in 2023 as Copa Oster.

== History ==
- I Copa Bionaire – $25,000 – August 11–19, 2007.

The first Copa Bionaire took place at the Country Club Los Arrayanes in Bogotá with more than 55 players participating from 13 countries around the world. The winner was Brazilian Teliana Pereira and the runner up was Federica Piedade of Portugal. In the doubles category the winners were Joana Cortés and Roxana Vaisemnberg of Brazil.

- II Copa Bionaire – $25,000 – February 2–10, 2008.

The second Copa Bionaire was held in the Farallones Club in Cali, Colombia as the largest ITF female tennis event and most important held in the city that year. More than 61 players participated from 19 countries worldwide. The winner in the singles category was Matilde Johansson of France, having defeated Canadian Ekaterina Shulaeva. In doubles, the winners were Mailen Auroux of Argentina and Estefanía Craciún from Uruguay.

- III Copa Bionaire – $50,000 – February 7–15, 2009.

The third annual Copa Bionaire was the most important ITF professional women's tournament in Latin America. It took place at the Country Club and had 56 players participating from 25 countries, three of the players were ranked in the top 100 female tennis players in the WTA rankings. The winner was Anastasiya Yakimova of Belarus who beat Rosanna de los Ríos of Paraguay. In doubles, the winners were Betina Jozami from Argentina and Arantxa Parra Santonja from Spain.

- IV Copa Bionaire – $75,000 – February 6–14, 2010.

The fourth annual Copa Bionaire was the most important ITF professional women's tournament in Latin America that year. It took place at the Cali Country Club and had 62 players participating from 20 countries, six of the players were ranked in the top 100 female tennis players in the WTA such as Polona Hercog of Slovenia who won that year, beating Colombian Mariana Duque. In doubles, the winning team was Hercog and Edina Gallovits of Romania.

- V Copa Bionaire – $100,000 – February 3–13, 2011

The Copa Bionaire has become the most relevant ITF women's professional tournament in all of Latin America. Once again, the tournament took place at the Cali Country Club and had 58 players participating from 22 countries around the world, five of which were ranked in the top 100 and 23 in the top 200. The winner was Irina-Camelia Begu of Romania who also won the doubles tournament with teammate and fellow Romanian Elena Bogdan.

- VI Copa Bionaire – $100.000+H – February 4–12, 2012

In February 2012 the VI Copa Bionaire took place with an increased prize of $100,000+H, offering a higher ranking for WTA players. The ITF considers the Copa Bionaire as the most important tennis cup in Latin America bringing together some of the best international female tennis players to Cali.

- VII Copa Bionaire – $125,000+H – February 9–17, 2013

In February 2013, the VI Copa Bionaire took place with a record prize money of $125,000+H, evolving into an even bigger tournament and offering a higher ranking for WTA players. The WTA category tournament kicked off the women's tennis circuit in Latin America.

- VIII Copa Oster – $115,000 – January 30–February 5, 2023

== Past finals ==
=== Singles ===
Year	Champion	Runner-up	Score
2026	(Spain) Leyre Romero Gormaz	(Canada) Bianca Andreescu	7–6^{(7–4)}, 6–3
2025	(Austria) Sinja Kraus	(Hungary) Panna Udvardy	6–2, 6–0
2024	(Romania) Irina-Camelia Begu (2)	(Slovenia) Veronika Erjavec	6–3, 6–3
2023	(Argentina) Nadia Podoroska	(Argentina) Paula Ormaechea	6–4, 6–2
2014–22	not held		
2013	(Spain) Lara Arruabarrena Vecino	(Colombia) Catalina Castaño	6–3, 6–2
↑ WTA $125,000 event ↑
2012	(Romania) Alexandra Dulgheru	(Luxembourg) Mandy Minella	6–3, 1–6, 6–3
2011	(Romania) Irina-Camelia Begu	(Spain) Laura Pous Tió	6–3, 7–6^{(7–1)}
2010	(Slovenia) Polona Hercog	(Colombia) Mariana Duque-Marino	6–4, 5–7, 6–2
2009	(Belarus) Anastasiya Yakimova	(Paraguay) Rossana de los Ríos	6–3, 6–0
2008	(France) Mathilde Johansson	(Canada) Ekaterina Shulaeva	3–6, 6–0, 6–1
2007	(Brazil) Teliana Pereira	(Portugal) Frederica Piedade	7–6^{(7–2)}, 6–2
↑ ITF event ↑

=== Doubles ===
Year	Champions	Runners-up	Score
2026	(United States) Anna Rogers (United States) Allura Zamarripa	(Argentina) María Lourdes Carlé (Brazil) Laura Pigossi	7–6^{(7–5)}, 7–5
2025	(Brazil) Ana Candiotto (Brazil) Laura Pigossi	(Italy) Nicole Fossa Huergo (Georgia (country)) Ekaterine Gorgodze	6–3, 6–1
2024	(Slovenia) Veronika Erjavec (France) Kristina Mladenovic	(Croatia) Tara Würth (Ukraine) Katarina Zavatska	6–2, 7–6^{(7–4)}
2023	(Poland) Weronika Falkowska (Poland) Katarzyna Kawa	(Japan) Kyōka Okamura (China) You Xiaodi	6–1, 5–7, [10–6]
2014–22	not held		
2013	(Colombia) Catalina Castaño (Colombia) Mariana Duque-Marino	(Argentina) Florencia Molinero (Brazil) Teliana Pereira	3–6, 6–1, [10–5]
↑ WTA $125,000 event ↑
2012	(Italy) Karin Knapp (Luxembourg) Mandy Minella	(Romania) Alexandra Cadanțu (Romania) Raluca Olaru	6–4, 6–3
2011	(Romania) Irina-Camelia Begu (Romania) Elena Bogdan	(Russia) Ekaterina Ivanova (Germany) Kathrin Wörle	2–6, 7–6^{(8–6)}, [11–9]
2010	(Romania) Edina Gallovits (Slovenia) Polona Hercog	(Spain) Estrella Cabeza Candela (Spain) Laura Pous Tió	3–6, 6–3, [10–8]
2009	(Argentina) Betina Jozami (Spain) Arantxa Parra Santonja	(Portugal) Frederica Piedade (Belarus) Anastasiya Yakimova	6–3, 6–1
2008	(Argentina) Mailen Auroux (Uruguay) Estefanía Craciún	(Austria) Melanie Klaffner (Belarus) Ksenia Milevskaya	6–1, 6–4
2007	(Brazil) Joana Cortez (Brazil) Roxane Vaisemberg	(Brazil) Ana Clara Duarte (Brazil) Teliana Pereira	5–7, 6–4, 6–4
↑ ITF event ↑
