= 2010 Copa BBVA-Colsanitas – Singles =

Singles
- 2010 Copa BBVA-Colsanitas

Final
- Champion: (Colombia) Mariana Duque Mariño
- Runner-up: (Germany) Angelique Kerber
- Score: 6–4, 6–3

Details
- Draw: 32
- Seeds: 8

Events
Singles	Doubles
- Copa Colsanitas

María José Martínez Sánchez was the defending champion, but chose to compete in the 2010 Dubai Tennis Championships instead.
Mariana Duque Mariño won in the final 6–4, 6–3, against Angelique Kerber.

== Seeds ==
1. (Argentina) Gisela Dulko (semifinals)
2. (Spain) Carla Suárez Navarro (first round)
3. (Italy) Sara Errani (quarterfinals)
4. (Slovenia) Polona Hercog (first round)
5. (Germany) Angelique Kerber (final)
6. (Czech Republic) Sandra Záhlavová (quarterfinals)
7. (Czech Republic) Klára Zakopalová (quarterfinals)
8. (Spain) Arantxa Parra Santonja (semifinals)

== Draw ==
Key

- Q = Qualifier
- WC = Wild card
- LL = Lucky loser
- Alt = Alternate
- ITF = ITF entry
- PR = Protected ranking
- SR = Special ranking
- SE = Special exempt
- JE = Junior exempt
- JR = Junior Accelerator Programme entrant
- CO = College Accelerator Programme entrant
- NG = Next Gen Accelerator Program entrant
- w/o = Walkover
- r = Retired
- d = Defaulted

=== Finals ===
Semifinals
1	(Argentina) Gisela Dulko	5	3
5	(Germany) Angelique Kerber	7	6
8	(Spain) Arantxa Parra Santonja	4	5
(Colombia) Mariana Duque Mariño	6	7

Final
5	(Germany) Angelique Kerber	4	3
(Colombia) Mariana Duque Mariño	6	6

=== Top half ===
First round
1	(Argentina) G Dulko	6	6
(France) M Johansson	4	4
(Romania) E Gallovits	6	6
(Spain) L Domínguez Lino	2	1
(Czech Republic) P Cetkovská	6	7
WC	(Peru) B Botto	4	5
(Russia) A Panova	3	2
6	(Czech Republic) S Záhlavová	6	6
4	(Slovenia) P Hercog	5	2
WC	(Colombia) C Castaño	7	6
(France) P Parmentier	6	6
Q	(Italy) C Dentoni	3	2
(Paraguay) R de los Ríos	6	6
(Slovenia) M Zec Peškirič	4	1
(Canada) S Fichman	3	6	4
5	(Germany) A Kerber	6	3	6

Second round
1	(Argentina) G Dulko	6	7
(Romania) E Gallovits	2	5
(Czech Republic) P Cetkovská	2	2
6	(Czech Republic) S Záhlavová	6	6
WC	(Colombia) C Castaño	2	4
(France) P Parmentier	6	6
(Paraguay) R de los Ríos	6^{2}	4
5	(Germany) A Kerber	7	6

Quarterfinals
1	(Argentina) G Dulko	6	6
6	(Czech Republic) S Záhlavová	2	3
(France) P Parmentier	1	4
5	(Germany) A Kerber	6	6

Semifinals
1	(Argentina) G Dulko	5	3
5	(Germany) A Kerber	7	6

=== Bottom half ===
First round
8	(Spain) A Parra Santonja	6^{6}	6	6
(Ukraine) O Savchuk	7	4	2
WC	(Colombia) P Zabala	1	3
(Austria) P Mayr	6	6
(Spain) S Soler Espinosa	3	6	6
(Slovakia) L Wienerová	6	4	2
(Belarus) A Yakimova	0	4
3	(Italy) S Errani	6	6
7	(Czech Republic) K Zakopalová	4	7^{7}	6
(United States) L Albanese	6	6^{2}	1
Q	(Spain) L Pous Tió	3	6	1
(Ukraine) M Koryttseva	6	1	6
Q	(Hungary) G Arn	6	0	3
(Colombia) M Duque Mariño	2	6	6
Q	(Ukraine) K Antoniychuk	6	6
2	(Spain) C Suárez Navarro	1	4

Second round
8	(Spain) A Parra Santonja	5	7	6
(Austria) P Mayr	7	6^{5}	4
(Spain) S Soler Espinosa	3	1
3	(Italy) S Errani	6	6
7	(Czech Republic) K Zakopalová	1	6	6
(Ukraine) M Koryttseva	6	3	4
(Colombia) M Duque Mariño	7	7
Q	(Ukraine) K Antoniychuk	6^{3}	6^{10}

Quarterfinals
8	(Spain) A Parra Santonja	7	6
3	(Italy) S Errani	5	2
7	(Czech Republic) K Zakopalová	0	6^{4}
(Colombia) M Duque Mariño	6	7

Semifinals
8	(Spain) A Parra Santonja	4	5
(Colombia) M Duque Mariño	6	7
