= 2011 Copa Sony Ericsson Colsanitas – Singles =

Singles
- 2011 Copa Sony Ericsson Colsanitas

Final
- Champion: (Spain) Lourdes Domínguez Lino
- Runner-up: (France) Mathilde Johansson
- Score: 2–6, 6–3, 6–2

Details
- Draw: 32
- Seeds: 8

Events
Singles	Doubles
- Copa Sony Ericsson Colsanitas

Mariana Duque Mariño was the defending champion, but she lost to Han Xinyun in the first round.
Seventh seed Lourdes Domínguez Lino defeated Mathilde Johansson 2–6, 6–3, 6–2 in the final.

== Seeds ==
1. (Germany) Julia Görges (second round)
2. (Slovenia) Polona Hercog (second round)
3. (Romania) Simona Halep (first round)
4. (Spain) Arantxa Parra Santonja (first round)
5. (Spain) Carla Suárez Navarro (semifinals)
6. (Romania) Edina Gallovits-Hall (first round)
7. (Spain) Lourdes Domínguez Lino (champion)
8. (Spain) Anabel Medina Garrigues (first round)

== Draw ==
Key

- Q = Qualifier
- WC = Wild card
- LL = Lucky loser
- Alt = Alternate
- ITF = ITF entry
- PR = Protected ranking
- SR = Special ranking
- SE = Special exempt
- JE = Junior exempt
- JR = Junior Accelerator Programme entrant
- CO = College Accelerator Programme entrant
- NG = Next Gen Accelerator Program entrant
- w/o = Walkover
- r = Retired
- d = Defaulted

=== Finals ===
Semifinals
5	(Spain) Carla Suárez Navarro	2	6	0
(France) Mathilde Johansson	6	2	6
7	(Spain) Lourdes Domínguez Lino	w/o
(Croatia) Petra Martić

Final
(France) Mathilde Johansson	6	3	2
7	(Spain) Lourdes Domínguez Lino	2	6	6

=== Top half ===
First round
1	(Germany) J Görges	7	2	7
(France) O Sanchez	6^{5}	6	5
(Colombia) M Duque Mariño	1	6	1
(China) X Han	6	3	6
(Ukraine) M Koryttseva	2	6^{4}
(Austria) P Mayr-Achleitner	6	7
(Slovenia) M Zec Peškirič	3	2
5	(Spain) C Suárez Navarro	6	6
3	(Romania) S Halep	6^{5}	5
(France) M Johansson	7	7
(Austria) Y Meusburger	7	6
(Russia) A Panova	6^{1}	3
Q	(Canada) S Fichman	6	6
WC	(Spain) L Costas Moreira	1	2
WC	(Colombia) C Castaño	7	2	7
8	(Spain) A Medina Garrigues	6^{5}	6	6^{5}

Second round
1	(Germany) J Görges	7	3	6^{4}
(China) X Han	5	6	7
(Austria) P Mayr-Achleitner	6	4	2
5	(Spain) C Suárez Navarro	1	6	6
(France) M Johansson	6	6
(Austria) Y Meusburger	4	0
Q	(Canada) S Fichman	6	5	2
WC	(Colombia) C Castaño	4	7	6

Quarterfinals
(China) X Han	4	3
5	(Spain) C Suárez Navarro	6	6
(France) M Johansson	6	7
WC	(Colombia) C Castaño	3	6^{5}

Semifinals
5	(Spain) C Suárez Navarro	2	6	0
(France) M Johansson	6	2	6

=== Bottom half ===
First round
7	(Spain) L Domínguez Lino	6	6
(Luxembourg) M Minella	1	4
Q	(Peru) B Botto	1	1	r
(Czech Republic) E Birnerová	6	0
Q	(Italy) C Dentoni	6	2	6
(Czech Republic) P Cetkovská	2	6	3
Q	(Spain) B García Vidagany	7	3	6
4	(Spain) A Parra Santonja	5	6	4
6	(Romania) E Gallovits-Hall	7	4	3
(Russia) N Bratchikova	5	6	6
(Spain) L Pous Tió	6	7
WC	(Spain) S Soler Espinosa	1	5
(Czech Republic) Z Ondrášková	5	1
(Croatia) P Martić	7	6
(France) P Parmentier	7	6^{10}	2
2	(Slovenia) P Hercog	6^{2}	7	6

Second round
7	(Spain) L Domínguez Lino	6	6
(Czech Republic) E Birnerová	2	2
Q	(Italy) C Dentoni	6	3	4
Q	(Spain) B García Vidagany	3	6	6
(Russia) N Bratchikova	6	2	1
(Spain) L Pous Tió	3	6	6
(Croatia) P Martić	6	6
2	(Slovenia) P Hercog	2	3

Quarterfinals
7	(Spain) L Domínguez Lino	6	6
Q	(Spain) B García Vidagany	4	3
(Spain) L Pous Tió	6	3
(Croatia) P Martić	7	6

Semifinals
7	(Spain) L Domínguez Lino	w/o
(Croatia) P Martić
