= 2010 Copa BBVA-Colsanitas =

- Date: 15–21 February
- Edition: 13th
- Category: WTA International
- Draw: 32S / 16D
- Prize money: $220,000
- Surface: Clay / outdoor
- Location: Bogotá, Colombia
- Venue: Club Campestre El Rancho

Champions

Singles
- (Colombia) Mariana Duque Mariño

Doubles
- (Argentina) Gisela Dulko / (Romania) Edina Gallovits
← 2009 ·	Copa Colsanitas	· 2011 →

The 2010 Copa BBVA-Colsanitas was a women's tennis tournament played on outdoor clay courts. It was the 13th edition of the Copa Colsanitas, and was on the International category of the 2010 WTA Tour. It took place at the Club Campestre El Rancho in Bogotá, Colombia, from 15 to 21 February 2010. Unseeded Mariana Duque Mariño won the singles title.

The previous year's finalist Gisela Dulko was the top-seeded player. Also in the field were 2008 semifinalist Carla Suárez Navarro, Italian Sara Errani, the previous year's semifinalist Patricia Mayr, Klára Zakopalová, Angelique Kerber, and Arantxa Parra Santonja.

== Finals ==
=== Singles ===
(Colombia) Mariana Duque Mariño defeated (Germany) Angelique Kerber 6–4, 6–3

- It was Duque Mariño's ony singles title of her career.

=== Doubles ===
(Argentina) Gisela Dulko / (Romania) Edina Gallovits defeated (Ukraine) Olga Savchuk / (Belarus) Anastasiya Yakimova 6–2, 7–6^{(8–6)}

== Singles main draw entrants ==
=== Seeds ===
Country	Player	Ranking^{1}	Seeding
ARG	Gisela Dulko	35	1
ESP	Carla Suárez Navarro	42	2
ITA	Sara Errani	45	3
SLO	Polona Hercog	63	4
GER	Angelique Kerber	85	5
CZE	Sandra Záhlavová	86	6
CZE	Klára Zakopalová	90	7
ESP	Arantxa Parra Santonja	93	8

- ^{1} Rankings as of February 8, 2010.

=== Other entrants ===
The following players received wildcards into the main draw:

- (Peru) Bianca Botto
- (Colombia) Catalina Castaño
- (Colombia) Paula Zabala

The following players received entry from the qualifying draw:

- (Ukraine) Kristina Antoniychuk
- (Hungary) Gréta Arn
- (Italy) Corinna Dentoni
- (Spain) Laura Pous Tió

== Doubles main draw entrants ==
=== Seeds ===
Country	Player	Country	Player	Rank^{1}	Seed
UKR	Mariya Koryttseva	CAN	Marie-Ève Pelletier	124	1
ARG	Gisela Dulko	ROU	Edina Gallovits	128	2
ESP	Lourdes Domínguez Lino	ESP	Arantxa Parra Santonja	186	3
CAN	Sharon Fichman	USA	Mashona Washington	198	4

- ^{1} Rankings as of February 8, 2010.

=== Other entrants ===
The following pairs received wildcards into the doubles main draw:

- (Peru) Bianca Botto / (Colombia) Mariana Duque Mariño
- (Slovakia) Martina Frantová / (Colombia) Karen Ramírez Rivera
