= 2011 Copa Sony Ericsson Colsanitas – Singles qualifying =

This article displays the qualifying draw of the 2011 Copa Sony Ericsson Colsanitas.

== Players ==
=== Seeds ===
1. (Italy) Corinna Dentoni (Qualifier)
2. (United States) Julia Cohen (first round)
3. (Germany) Kathrin Wörle (first round)
4. (Greece) Eleni Daniilidou (second round)
5. (Russia) Ekaterina Ivanova (first round)
6. (Russia) Arina Rodionova (first round)
7. (Romania) Irina-Camelia Begu (withdrew - still playing ITF Cali)
8. (Spain) Beatriz García Vidagany (Qualifier)

=== Qualifiers ===
1. (Italy) Corinna Dentoni
2. (Peru) Bianca Botto
3. (Spain) Beatriz García Vidagany
4. (Canada) Sharon Fichman

== Qualifying draw ==
=== First qualifier ===
First round
1	(Italy) Corinna Dentoni	6	6
(Russia) Valeria Solovieva	4	2
(Argentina) Paula Ormaechea	6	6
(Liechtenstein) Stephanie Vogt	4	1
(Romania) Elena Bogdan	6	6
(Brazil) Ana-Clara Duarte	4	3
(Spain) María-Teresa Torró-Flor	6	5	6
6	(Russia) Arina Rodionova	3	7	4

Second round
1	(Italy) Corinna Dentoni	4	7	6
(Argentina) Paula Ormaechea	6	6^{1}	2
(Romania) Elena Bogdan	6	6
(Spain) María-Teresa Torró-Flor	3	2

Qualifying competition
1	(Italy) Corinna Dentoni	4	7	6
(Romania) Elena Bogdan	6	5	2

=== Second qualifier ===
First round
2	(United States) Julia Cohen	6	1	3
(Slovenia) Andreja Klepač	3	6	6
WC	(Colombia) Angélica María Torres	1	0
(Israel) Julia Glushko	6	6
(Romania) Alexandra Cadanțu	0	6	6^{3}
(Ukraine) Lyudmyla Kichenok	6	2	7
(Peru) Bianca Botto	7	7
5	(Russia) Ekaterina Ivanova	5	5

Second round
(Slovenia) Andreja Klepač	4	4
(Israel) Julia Glushko	6	6
(Ukraine) Lyudmyla Kichenok	1	6	6^{5}
(Peru) Bianca Botto	6	3	7

Qualifying competition
(Israel) Julia Glushko	6^{4}	6	3
(Peru) Bianca Botto	7	2	6

=== Third qualifier ===
First round
3	(Germany) Kathrin Wörle	4	7	3
WC	(Colombia) Yuliana Lizarazo	6	5	6
(Romania) Mădălina Gojnea	3	6	6
(Spain) Eva Fernández Brugués	6	3	4
(Romania) Ioana Raluca Olaru	6	7
(Canada) Heidi El Tabakh	4	6^{6}
WC	(Colombia) Alexandra Moreno-Kaste	0	3
8	(Spain) Beatriz García Vidagany	6	6

Second round
WC	(Colombia) Yuliana Lizarazo	6^{5}	4
(Romania) Mădălina Gojnea	7	6
(Romania) Ioana Raluca Olaru	4	6	3
8	(Spain) Beatriz García Vidagany	6	4	6

Qualifying competition
(Romania) Mădălina Gojnea	4	2
8	(Spain) Beatriz García Vidagany	6	6

=== Fourth qualifier ===
First round
4	(Greece) Eleni Daniilidou	6	6
(United States) Lindsay Lee-Waters	3	1
WC	(Colombia) Karen Castiblanco	2	0
(Argentina) María Irigoyen	6	6
(Germany) Laura Siegemund	3	1
(Argentina) Florencia Molinero	6	6
(Canada) Sharon Fichman	6	6
Alt	(Brazil) Maria Fernanda Alves	1	1

Second round
4	(Greece) Eleni Daniilidou	6^{5}	4
(Argentina) María Irigoyen	7	6
(Argentina) Florencia Molinero	2	1
(Canada) Sharon Fichman	6	6

Qualifying competition
(Argentina) María Irigoyen	6^{6}	6	6^{4}
(Canada) Sharon Fichman	7	2	7
