= 2008 French Open – Women's singles =

Women's singles
- 2008 French Open

Final
- Champion: (Serbia) Ana Ivanovic
- Runner-up: (Russia) Dinara Safina
- Score: 6–4, 6–3

Events
Singles	men	women		boys	girls
Doubles	men	women	mixed	boys	girls
WC Singles	men	women	quad
WC Doubles	men	women	quad
Legends	−45	45+	women
- French Open

Ana Ivanovic defeated Dinara Safina in the final, 6–4, 6–3 to win the women's singles tennis title at the 2008 French Open. It was her first and only major singles title. Ivanovic attained the world No. 1 singles ranking for the first time by reaching the final; Maria Sharapova, Jelena Janković and Svetlana Kuznetsova were also in contention for the top position.

Justine Henin was the three-time reigning champion and reigning world No. 1, but she retired from the sport in May 2008. This left Serena Williams as the only former French Open champion in the draw; when Williams was defeated in the third round by Katarina Srebotnik, a first-time French Open champion was guaranteed.

Safina reached the final after having come back from a set and match point down in both of her fourth round and quarterfinal matches, against Sharapova and Elena Dementieva, respectively.

This was the first major main draw appearance for future world No. 2 and two-time Wimbledon champion Petra Kvitová, who lost to Kaia Kanepi in the fourth round. With that win, Kanepi became the first Estonian to reach a major quarterfinal.

== Seeds ==
1. (Russia) Maria Sharapova (fourth round)
2. (Serbia) Ana Ivanovic (champion)
3. (Serbia) Jelena Janković (semifinals)
4. (Russia) Svetlana Kuznetsova (semifinals)
5. (United States) Serena Williams (third round)
6. (Russia) Anna Chakvetadze (second round)
7. (Russia) Elena Dementieva (quarterfinals)
8. (United States) Venus Williams (third round)
9. (France) Marion Bartoli (first round)
10. (Switzerland) Patty Schnyder (quarterfinals)
11. (Russia) Vera Zvonareva (fourth round)
12. (Hungary) Ágnes Szávay (third round)
13. (Russia) Dinara Safina (final)
14. (Poland) Agnieszka Radwańska (fourth round)
15. (Czech Republic) Nicole Vaidišová (first round)
16. (Belarus) Victoria Azarenka (fourth round)

17. (Israel) Shahar Pe'er (first round)
18. (Italy) Francesca Schiavone (third round)
19. (France) Alizé Cornet (third round)
20. (Austria) Sybille Bammer (first round)
21. (Russia) Maria Kirilenko (second round)
22. (France) Amélie Mauresmo (second round)
23. (Ukraine) Alona Bondarenko (first round)
24. (France) Virginie Razzano (first round)
25. (Russia) Nadia Petrova (third round)
26. (Italy) Flavia Pennetta (fourth round)
27. (Slovenia) Katarina Srebotnik (fourth round)
28. (Slovakia) Dominika Cibulková (third round)
29. (Spain) Anabel Medina Garrigues (third round)
30. (Denmark) Caroline Wozniacki (third round)
31. (Japan) Ai Sugiyama (second round)
32. (Italy) Karin Knapp (third round)

Click on the seed number of a player to go to their draw section.

== Draw ==
Key

- Q = Qualifier
- WC = Wild card
- LL = Lucky loser
- Alt = Alternate
- ITF = ITF entry
- PR = Protected ranking
- SR = Special ranking
- SE = Special exempt
- JE = Junior exempt
- JR = Junior Accelerator Programme entrant
- CO = College Accelerator Programme entrant
- NG = Next Gen Accelerator Program entrant
- w/o = Walkover
- r = Retired
- d = Defaulted

=== Finals ===
Quarterfinals
13	(Russia) Dinara Safina	4	7^{7}	6
7	(Russia) Elena Dementieva	6	6^{5}	0
4	(Russia) Svetlana Kuznetsova	7	6
(Estonia) Kaia Kanepi	5	2
Q	(Spain) Carla Suárez Navarro	3	2
3	(Serbia) Jelena Janković	6	6
10	(Switzerland) Patty Schnyder	3	2
2	(Serbia) Ana Ivanovic	6	6

Semifinals
13	(Russia) Dinara Safina	6	6
4	(Russia) Svetlana Kuznetsova	3	2
3	(Serbia) Jelena Janković	4	6	4
2	(Serbia) Ana Ivanovic	6	3	6

Final
13	(Russia) Dinara Safina	4	3
2	(Serbia) Ana Ivanovic	6	6

=== Top half ===
==== Section 1 ====
First round
1	(Russia) M Sharapova	6	3	8
(Russia) E Rodina	1	6	6
Q	(United States) B Mattek	6	2	6
WC	(United States) M Brengle	3	6	4
Q	(Slovakia) J Gajdošová	6^{4}	6^{8}
WC	(France) O Sanchez	7^{7}	7^{10}
(Germany) M Müller	0	4
32	(Italy) K Knapp	6	6
21	(Russia) M Kirilenko	6	6
(Italy) ME Camerin	1	0
Q	(China) J Zheng	4	6	6
(Italy) M Santangelo	6	3	0
Q	(Slovakia) M Rybáriková	7^{7}	3	8
PR	(Croatia) K Šprem	6^{3}	6	6
(Ukraine) K Bondarenko	1	3
13	(Russia) D Safina	6	6

Second round
1	(Russia) M Sharapova	6	3	6
Q	(United States) B Mattek	2	6	2
WC	(France) O Sanchez	2	6^{4}
32	(Italy) K Knapp	6	7^{7}
21	(Russia) M Kirilenko	6	3	2
Q	(China) J Zheng	4	6	6
Q	(Slovakia) M Rybáriková	0	1
13	(Russia) D Safina	6	6

Third round
1	(Russia) M Sharapova	7^{7}	6
32	(Italy) K Knapp	6^{4}	0
Q	(China) J Zheng	2	5
13	(Russia) D Safina	6	7

Fourth round
1	(Russia) M Sharapova	7^{8}	6^{5}	2
13	(Russia) D Safina	6^{6}	7^{7}	6

==== Section 2 ====
First round
11	(Russia) V Zvonareva	6	6
WC	(France) S Foretz	2	1
(Romania) IR Olaru	6^{4}	3
(France) S Cohen-Aloro	7^{7}	6
Q	(Belgium) Y Wickmayer	2	5
(Uzbekistan) A Amanmuradova	6	7
(Canada) A Wozniak	6	6
20	(Austria) S Bammer	0	2
31	(Japan) A Sugiyama	6	2	6
(Russia) A Kudryavtseva	1	6	3
(Belarus) O Govortsova	7	2	6
(Ukraine) Y Fedak	5	6	3
(Poland) M Domachowska	3	6	6
(Paraguay) R de los Ríos	6	3	1
(Russia) V Dushevina	7^{8}	0	2
7	(Russia) E Dementieva	6^{6}	6	6

Second round
11	(Russia) V Zvonareva	6	6
(France) S Cohen-Aloro	2	4
(Uzbekistan) A Amanmuradova	6	1	3
(Canada) A Wozniak	1	6	6
31	(Japan) A Sugiyama	0	5
(Belarus) O Govortsova	6	7
(Poland) M Domachowska	1	4
7	(Russia) E Dementieva	6	6

Third round
11	(Russia) V Zvonareva	6	6
(Canada) A Wozniak	2	2
(Belarus) O Govortsova	0	4
7	(Russia) E Dementieva	6	6

Fourth round
11	(Russia) V Zvonareva	4	6	2
7	(Russia) E Dementieva	6	1	6

==== Section 3 ====
First round
4	(Russia) S Kuznetsova	6	6
(Japan) A Nakamura	2	3
(United States) V King	4	6	6
WC	(France) V Huck	6	2	1
(Russia) A Kleybanova	6	6
(Thailand) T Tanasugarn	3	0
(France) A Rezaï	6^{4}	3
25	(Russia) N Petrova	7^{7}	6
18	(Italy) F Schiavone	6	6
(United States) J Craybas	3	2
PR	(Croatia) S Mamić	6	6
(Netherlands) M Krajicek	4	3
(Romania) S Cîrstea	6	3
(Luxembourg) A Kremer	0	0^{r}
(Romania) E Gallovits	1	3
16	(Belarus) V Azarenka	6	6

Second round
4	(Russia) S Kuznetsova	6	6
(United States) V King	4	2
(Russia) A Kleybanova	3	3
25	(Russia) N Petrova	6	6
18	(Italy) F Schiavone	6	6
PR	(Croatia) S Mamić	3	0
(Romania) S Cîrstea	0	0
16	(Belarus) V Azarenka	6	6

Third round
4	(Russia) S Kuznetsova	6	6
25	(Russia) N Petrova	2	1
18	(Italy) F Schiavone	1	1
16	(Belarus) V Azarenka	6	6

Fourth round
4	(Russia) S Kuznetsova	6	6
16	(Belarus) V Azarenka	2	3

==== Section 4 ====
First round
12	(Hungary) Á Szávay	6	4	6
(Japan) A Morita	1	6	4
(Germany) S Lisicki	3	6	6
(Russia) E Vesnina	6	4	0
(Czech Republic) P Kvitová	6	6
(Japan) A Morigami	4	3
WC	(Australia) S Stosur	6	3	6
17	(Israel) S Pe'er	2	6	1
29	(Spain) A Medina Garrigues	6	6
Q	(Spain) MJ Martínez Sánchez	3	2
(Chinese Taipei) Y-j Chan	7	2	0
(Bulgaria) T Pironkova	5	6	6
(Estonia) K Kanepi	6	6
(China) M Yuan	2	2
(Spain) N Llagostera Vives	3	7	1
6	(Russia) A Chakvetadze	6	5	6

Second round
12	(Hungary) Á Szávay	7^{7}	6
(Germany) S Lisicki	6^{3}	3
(Czech Republic) P Kvitová	6	6
WC	(Australia) S Stosur	2	1
29	(Spain) A Medina Garrigues	4	6	6
(Bulgaria) T Pironkova	6	3	1
(Estonia) K Kanepi	6	7^{7}
6	(Russia) A Chakvetadze	4	6^{2}

Third round
12	(Hungary) Á Szávay	6^{5}	6	2
(Czech Republic) P Kvitová	7^{7}	4	6
29	(Spain) A Medina Garrigues	1	7^{7}	5
(Estonia) K Kanepi	6	6^{5}	7

Fourth round
(Czech Republic) P Kvitová	3	6	1
(Estonia) K Kanepi	6	3	6

=== Bottom half ===
==== Section 5 ====
First round
8	(United States) V Williams	6	4	6
(Israel) T Obziler	3	6	2
(Canada) S Dubois	5	2
Q	(Tunisia) S Sfar	7	6
Q	(Russia) A Pavlyuchenkova	6	6
(Argentina) ME Salerni	1	1
(Ukraine) T Perebiynis	3	2
26	(Italy) F Pennetta	6	6
22	(France) A Mauresmo	7	4	6
(Ukraine) O Savchuk	5	6	1
Q	(Spain) C Suárez Navarro	6	5	6
(France) P Parmentier	4	7	2
(United States) J Ditty	5	6^{3}
(France) N Dechy	7	7^{7}
(Australia) C Dellacqua	6^{4}	6	6
9	(France) M Bartoli	7^{7}	3	2

Second round
8	(United States) V Williams	6	6
Q	(Tunisia) S Sfar	2	4
Q	(Russia) A Pavlyuchenkova	6	1	1
26	(Italy) F Pennetta	3	6	6
22	(France) A Mauresmo	3	4
Q	(Spain) C Suárez Navarro	6	6
(France) N Dechy	4	2
(Australia) C Dellacqua	6	6

Third round
8	(United States) V Williams	5	3
26	(Italy) F Pennetta	7	6
Q	(Spain) C Suárez Navarro	6	6
(Australia) C Dellacqua	3	3

Fourth round
26	(Italy) F Pennetta	3	2
Q	(Spain) C Suárez Navarro	6	6

==== Section 6 ====
First round
14	(Poland) A Radwańska	6	6
(Ukraine) M Koryttseva	4	3
WC	(France) S Brémond	6	3	2
Q	(Croatia) J Pandžić	4	6	6
(Italy) S Errani	4	6	5
(Argentina) G Dulko	6	4	7
(Ukraine) J Vakulenko	5	4
19	(France) A Cornet	7	6
28	(Slovakia) D Cibulková	6	6
(Germany) A Kerber	2	2
(Venezuela) M Sequera	7^{7}	7
(United States) L Osterloh	6^{5}	5
(Italy) T Garbin	7^{11}	3	3
(New Zealand) M Erakovic	6^{9}	6	6
LL	(Romania) M Niculescu	6^{3}	2
3	(Serbia) J Janković	7^{7}	6

Second round
14	(Poland) A Radwańska	6	6
Q	(Croatia) J Pandžić	2	0
(Argentina) G Dulko	0	6	4
19	(France) A Cornet	6	4	6
28	(Slovakia) D Cibulková	6	6
(Venezuela) M Sequera	3	0
(New Zealand) M Erakovic	2	6^{5}
3	(Serbia) J Janković	6	7^{7}

Third round
14	(Poland) A Radwańska	6	6
19	(France) A Cornet	4	4
28	(Slovakia) D Cibulková	5	3
3	(Serbia) J Janković	7	6

Fourth round
14	(Poland) A Radwańska	3	6^{3}
3	(Serbia) J Janković	6	7^{7}

==== Section 7 ====
First round
5	(United States) S Williams	6	6
(United States) A Harkleroad	2	1
WC	(France) M Johansson	6	4	6
(France) C Pin	4	6	2
(Russia) E Makarova	7	6
(Colombia) C Castaño	5	1
(Spain) V Ruano Pascual	4	2
27	(Slovenia) K Srebotnik	6	6
24	(France) V Razzano	6	3	2
(Czech Republic) K Zakopalová	4	6	6
(China) Z Yan	6	4	6
(France) É Loit	1	6	8
(Austria) T Paszek	6	3	3
(Switzerland) T Bacsinszky	1	6	6
(Russia) E Bychkova	3	4
10	(Switzerland) P Schnyder	6	6

Second round
5	(United States) S Williams	6	7
WC	(France) M Johansson	2	5
(Russia) E Makarova	0	5
27	(Slovenia) K Srebotnik	6	7
(Czech Republic) K Zakopalová	4	3
(France) É Loit	6	6
(Switzerland) T Bacsinszky	4	6	1
10	(Switzerland) P Schnyder	6	4	6

Third round
5	(United States) S Williams	4	4
27	(Slovenia) K Srebotnik	6	6
(France) É Loit	6^{4}	7	2
10	(Switzerland) P Schnyder	7^{7}	5	6

Fourth round
27	(Slovenia) K Srebotnik	2	4
10	(Switzerland) P Schnyder	6	6

==== Section 8 ====
First round
15	(Czech Republic) N Vaidišová	6^{2}	1
Q	(Czech Republic) I Benešová	7^{7}	6
(Russia) A Rodionova	0	6	3
(China) S Peng	6	2	6
(Russia) G Voskoboeva	6	6^{4}	6
WC	(France) Y Fedossova	0	7^{7}	1
(Czech Republic) P Cetkovská	6	6
23	(Ukraine) A Bondarenko	3	0
30	(Denmark) C Wozniacki	6	6
(Austria) Y Meusburger	0	2
Q	(Belarus) A Yakimova	6^{4}	7	6
(Chinese Taipei) S-w Hsieh	7^{7}	5	4
(Germany) S Klösel	1	1
(Czech Republic) L Šafářová	6	6
(Sweden) S Arvidsson	2	5
2	(Serbia) A Ivanovic	6	7

Second round
Q	(Czech Republic) I Benešová	6	6
(China) S Peng	4	3
(Russia) G Voskoboeva	5	3
(Czech Republic) P Cetkovská	7	6
30	(Denmark) C Wozniacki	6	6
Q	(Belarus) A Yakimova	0	4
(Czech Republic) L Šafářová	1	2
2	(Serbia) A Ivanovic	6	6

Third round
Q	(Czech Republic) I Benešová	3	3
(Czech Republic) P Cetkovská	6	6
30	(Denmark) C Wozniacki	4	1
2	(Serbia) A Ivanovic	6	6

Fourth round
(Czech Republic) P Cetkovská	0	0
2	(Serbia) A Ivanovic	6	6

== Championship match statistics ==
Category	(Serbia) Ivanovic	(Russia) Safina
1st serve %	47/68 (69%)	50/74 (68%)
1st serve points won	32 of 47 = 68%	27 of 50 = 54%
2nd serve points won	9 of 21 = 43%	10 of 24 = 42%
Total service points won	41 of 68 = 60%	37 of 74 = 50%
Aces	0	2
Double faults	1	5
Winners	41	37
Unforced errors	22	28
Net points won	9 of 11 = 82%	7 of 9 = 78%
Break points converted	5 of 9 = 56%	2 of 5 = 40%
Return points won	37 of 74 = 50%	27 of 68 = 40%
Total points won	78	64

Preceded by 2008 Australian Open – Women's singles	Grand Slam women's singles	Succeeded by 2008 Wimbledon Championships – Women's singles
