= 2013 US Open – Women's singles =

Women's singles
- 2013 US Open

Final
- Champion: (United States) Serena Williams
- Runner-up: (Belarus) Victoria Azarenka
- Score: 7–5, 6–7^{(6–8)}, 6–1

Details
- Draw: 128
- Seeds: 32

Events
Singles	men	women		boys	girls
Doubles	men	women	mixed	boys	girls
WC Singles	men	women	quad
WC Doubles	men	women	quad
Legends	men	women	mixed
← 2012 ·	US Open	· 2014 →

Defending champion Serena Williams defeated Victoria Azarenka in a rematch of the previous year's final, 7–5, 6–7^{(6–8)}, 6–1 to win the women's singles tennis title at the 2013 US Open. It was her fifth US Open singles title and 17th major singles title overall.

== Seeds ==
1. (United States) Serena Williams (champion)
2. (Belarus) Victoria Azarenka (final)
3. (Poland) Agnieszka Radwańska (fourth round)
4. (Italy) Sara Errani (second round)
5. (China) Li Na (semifinals)
6. (Denmark) Caroline Wozniacki (third round)
7. (Czech Republic) Petra Kvitová (third round)
8. (Germany) Angelique Kerber (fourth round)
9. (Serbia) Jelena Janković (fourth round)
10. (Italy) Roberta Vinci (quarterfinals)
11. (Australia) Samantha Stosur (first round)
12. (Belgium) Kirsten Flipkens (first round)
13. (Serbia) Ana Ivanovic (fourth round)
14. (Russia) Maria Kirilenko (third round)
15. (United States) Sloane Stephens (fourth round)
16. (Germany) Sabine Lisicki (third round)

17. (Slovakia) Dominika Cibulková (first round)
18. (Spain) Carla Suárez Navarro (quarterfinals)
19. (Romania) Sorana Cîrstea (second round)
20. (Russia) Nadia Petrova (first round)
21. (Romania) Simona Halep (fourth round)
22. (Russia) Elena Vesnina (second round)
23. (United States) Jamie Hampton (third round)
24. (Russia) Ekaterina Makarova (quarterfinals)
25. (Estonia) Kaia Kanepi (third round)
26. (France) Alizé Cornet (third round)
27. (Russia) Svetlana Kuznetsova (third round)
28. (Germany) Mona Barthel (second round)
29. (Slovakia) Magdaléna Rybáriková (first round)
30. (United Kingdom) Laura Robson (third round)
31. (Czech Republic) Klára Zakopalová (first round)
32. (Russia) Anastasia Pavlyuchenkova (third round)

Click on the seed number of a player to go to their draw section.

== Draw ==
=== Key ===
- Q = Qualifier
- WC = Wild card
- LL = Lucky loser
- Alt = Alternate
- ITF = ITF entry
- PR = Protected ranking
- SR = Special ranking
- SE = Special exempt
- JE = Junior exempt
- JR = Junior Accelerator Programme entrant
- CO = College Accelerator Programme entrant
- NG = Next Gen Accelerator Program entrant
- w/o = Walkover
- r = Retired
- d = Defaulted

=== Finals ===
Quarterfinals
1	(United States) Serena Williams	6	6
18	(Spain) Carla Suárez Navarro	0	0
24	(Russia) Ekaterina Makarova	4	7^{7}	2
5	(China) Li Na	6	6^{5}	6
10	(Italy) Roberta Vinci	4	1
(Italy) Flavia Pennetta	6	6
(Slovakia) Daniela Hantuchová	2	3
2	(Belarus) Victoria Azarenka	6	6

Semifinals
1	(United States) Serena Williams	6	6
5	(China) Li Na	0	3
(Italy) Flavia Pennetta	4	2
2	(Belarus) Victoria Azarenka	6	6

Final
1	(United States) Serena Williams	7	6^{6}	6
2	(Belarus) Victoria Azarenka	5	7^{8}	1

=== Top half ===
==== Section 1 ====
First round
1	(United States) S Williams	6	6
(Italy) F Schiavone	0	1
(Kazakhstan) G Voskoboeva	6	6
(Romania) M Niculescu	4	3
(Kazakhstan) Y Shvedova	6	6
(Russia) O Puchkova	1	0
LL	(Austria) P Mayr-Achleitner	7^{7}	6
29	(Slovakia) M Rybáriková	6^{2}	3
23	(United States) J Hampton	6	6
(Spain) L Arruabarrena	4	2
(France) K Mladenovic	6	1	6
(Spain) A Medina Garrigues	1	6	1
(Romania) I-C Begu	1	3
(Poland) U Radwańska	6	6
(Luxembourg) M Minella	6	3	6^{5}
15	(United States) S Stephens	4	6	7^{7}

Second round
1	(United States) S Williams	6	6
(Kazakhstan) G Voskoboeva	3	0
(Kazakhstan) Y Shvedova	6	6
LL	(Austria) P Mayr-Achleitner	2	3
23	(United States) J Hampton	7	6
(France) K Mladenovic	5	4
(Poland) U Radwańska	1	1
15	(United States) S Stephens	6	6

Third round
1	(United States) S Williams	6	6
(Kazakhstan) Y Shvedova	3	1
23	(United States) J Hampton	1	3
15	(United States) S Stephens	6	6

Fourth round
1	(United States) S Williams	6	6
15	(United States) S Stephens	4	1

==== Section 2 ====
First round
12	(Belgium) K Flipkens	1	2
(United States) V Williams	6	6
(Netherlands) K Bertens	1	3
(China) J Zheng	6	6
Q	(United States) C Vandeweghe	6	7^{7}
Q	(Serbia) A Krunić	4	6^{5}
(United States) L Davis	0	0
18	(Spain) C Suárez Navarro	6	6
25	(Estonia) K Kanepi	4	7^{7}	6
WC	(United States) V King	6	6^{4}	1
(Switzerland) S Vögele	1	7	6^{4}
(Slovakia) AK Schmiedlová	6	5	7^{7}
(Czech Republic) Ka Plíšková	6	4	5
(Canada) E Bouchard	4	6	7
(Czech Republic) L Hradecká	1	1
8	(Germany) A Kerber	6	6

Second round
(United States) V Williams	3	6	6^{5}
(China) J Zheng	6	2	7^{7}
Q	(United States) C Vandeweghe	3	4
18	(Spain) C Suárez Navarro	6	6
25	(Estonia) K Kanepi	6	6
(Slovakia) AK Schmiedlová	4	1
(Canada) E Bouchard	4	6	3
8	(Germany) A Kerber	6	2	6

Third round
(China) J Zheng	2	4
18	(Spain) C Suárez Navarro	6	6
25	(Estonia) K Kanepi	0	4
8	(Germany) A Kerber	6	6

Fourth round
18	(Spain) C Suárez Navarro	4	6	7^{7}
8	(Germany) A Kerber	6	3	6^{3}

==== Section 3 ====
First round
3	(Poland) A Radwańska	6	6
(Spain) S Soler Espinosa	1	2
(Spain) MT Torró Flor	6	6
(New Zealand) M Erakovic	0	4
(Spain) E Cabeza Candela	1	4
WC	(Australia) A Barty	6	6
WC	(France) V Razzano	5	0
32	(Russia) A Pavlyuchenkova	7	6
24	(Russia) E Makarova	6	6
(Slovenia) P Hercog	2	4
(France) M Johansson	3	1
(United States) B Mattek-Sands	6	6
(Argentina) P Ormaechea	6	7^{9}
(Japan) K Date-Krumm	3	6^{7}
Q	(Russia) V Dushevina	2	6^{3}
16	(Germany) S Lisicki	6	7^{7}

Second round
3	(Poland) A Radwańska	6	7
(Spain) MT Torró Flor	0	5
WC	(Australia) A Barty	4	0
32	(Russia) A Pavlyuchenkova	6	6
24	(Russia) E Makarova	6	6
(United States) B Mattek-Sands	4	4
(Argentina) P Ormaechea	2	3
16	(Germany) S Lisicki	6	6

Third round
3	(Poland) A Radwańska	6	7^{7}
32	(Russia) A Pavlyuchenkova	4	6^{1}
24	(Russia) E Makarova	6	7
16	(Germany) S Lisicki	4	5

Fourth round
3	(Poland) A Radwańska	4	4
24	(Russia) E Makarova	6	6

==== Section 4 ====
First round
9	(Serbia) J Janković	6	6
(United States) M Keys	3	4
(Puerto Rico) M Puig	4	6	5
PR	(Russia) A Kleybanova	6	3	7
Q	(Japan) K Nara	6	6
(Romania) A Cadanțu	2	2
Q	(Canada) S Fichman	5	7	1
19	(Romania) S Cîrstea	7	5	6
30	(United Kingdom) L Robson	7	6
(Spain) L Domínguez Lino	5	0
(France) C Garcia	6	6
WC	(United States) S Rogers	3	2
PR	(Czech Republic) P Cetkovská	6	4	1
(Sweden) S Arvidsson	1	6	6
(Belarus) O Govortsova	2	2
5	(China) N Li	6	6

Second round
9	(Serbia) J Janković	6	6
PR	(Russia) A Kleybanova	3	2
Q	(Japan) K Nara	7	6
19	(Romania) S Cîrstea	5	1
30	(United Kingdom) L Robson	6	7^{7}
(France) C Garcia	4	6^{5}
(Sweden) S Arvidsson	2	2
5	(China) N Li	6	6

Third round
9	(Serbia) J Janković	6	7^{7}
Q	(Japan) K Nara	4	6^{5}
30	(United Kingdom) L Robson	2	5
5	(China) N Li	6	7

Fourth round
9	(Serbia) J Janković	3	0
5	(China) N Li	6	6

=== Bottom half ===
==== Section 5 ====
First round
6	(Denmark) C Wozniacki	6	7
Q	(China) Y Duan	2	5
(South Africa) C Scheepers	2	6	6
Q	(South Africa) C Simmonds	6	2	1
(Slovakia) J Čepelová	2	2
Q	(Italy) C Giorgi	6	6
(Chinese Taipei) S-w Hsieh	6	6
31	(Czech Republic) K Zakopalová	3	3
22	(Russia) E Vesnina	6	6
(Germany) A Beck	1	1
(Italy) K Knapp	6	6
Q	(United States) G Min	3	1
(Ukraine) L Tsurenko	3	6	4
(Czech Republic) L Šafářová	6	2	6
(Hungary) T Babos	4	2
10	(Italy) R Vinci	6	6

Second round
6	(Denmark) C Wozniacki	6	6
(South Africa) C Scheepers	1	2
Q	(Italy) C Giorgi	6	7^{10}
(Chinese Taipei) S-w Hsieh	4	6^{8}
22	(Russia) E Vesnina	1	4
(Italy) K Knapp	6	6
(Czech Republic) L Šafářová	6	1	2
10	(Italy) R Vinci	4	6	6

Third round
6	(Denmark) C Wozniacki	6	4	3
Q	(Italy) C Giorgi	4	6	6
(Italy) K Knapp	4	3
10	(Italy) R Vinci	6	6

Fourth round
Q	(Italy) C Giorgi	4	2
10	(Italy) R Vinci	6	6

==== Section 6 ====
First round
14	(Russia) M Kirilenko	6	6
(Belgium) Y Wickmayer	1	1
Q	(Portugal) M Larcher de Brito	6	6
(Greece) E Daniilidou	4	3
(Croatia) D Vekić	7^{7}	4	6
(Colombia) M Duque Mariño	6^{5}	6	2
(United Kingdom) H Watson	6	4	2
21	(Romania) S Halep	4	6	6
27	(Russia) S Kuznetsova	6	7
(United States) M Burdette	3	5
(China) S Peng	6	6
(Austria) Y Meusburger	3	4
WC	(United States) N Gibbs	0	2
(Italy) F Pennetta	6	6
LL	(Australia) O Rogowska	0	0
4	(Italy) S Errani	6	6

Second round
14	(Russia) M Kirilenko	6	6
Q	(Portugal) M Larcher de Brito	3	1
(Croatia) D Vekić	2	1
21	(Romania) S Halep	6	6
27	(Russia) S Kuznetsova	6	4	6
(China) S Peng	1	6	4
(Italy) F Pennetta	6	6
4	(Italy) S Errani	3	1

Third round
14	(Russia) M Kirilenko	1	0
21	(Romania) S Halep	6	6
27	(Russia) S Kuznetsova	5	1
(Italy) F Pennetta	7	6

Fourth round
21	(Romania) S Halep	2	6^{3}
(Italy) F Pennetta	6	7^{7}

==== Section 7 ====
First round
7	(Czech Republic) P Kvitová	6	3	6
(Japan) M Doi	2	6	1
(Serbia) B Jovanovski	6	6
(Germany) A Petkovic	2	4
(Bulgaria) T Pironkova	3	3
WC	(United States) A Riske	6	6
(Sweden) J Larsson	1	4
28	(Germany) M Barthel	6	6
20	(Russia) N Petrova	3	4
Q	(Israel) J Glushko	6	6
Q	(Croatia) M Lučić-Baroni	4	4
WC	(United States) S Vickery	6	6
WC	(United States) M Sanchez	5	2
(Slovakia) D Hantuchová	7	6
Q	(United States) V Duval	5	6	6
11	(Australia) S Stosur	7	4	4

Second round
7	(Czech Republic) P Kvitová	6	6
(Serbia) B Jovanovski	2	4
WC	(United States) A Riske	6	6
28	(Germany) M Barthel	4	2
Q	(Israel) J Glushko	7	6
WC	(United States) S Vickery	5	3
(Slovakia) D Hantuchová	6	6
Q	(United States) V Duval	2	3

Third round
7	(Czech Republic) P Kvitová	3	0
WC	(United States) A Riske	6	6
Q	(Israel) J Glushko	6	5	6^{4}
(Slovakia) D Hantuchová	3	7	7^{7}

Fourth round
WC	(United States) A Riske	3	7	2
(Slovakia) D Hantuchová	6	5	6

==== Section 8 ====
First round
13	(Serbia) A Ivanovic	6	6
(Georgia (country)) A Tatishvili	2	0
(United States) V Lepchenko	7^{7}	2	6^{5}
PR	(Romania) A Dulgheru	6^{5}	6	7^{7}
(Germany) J Görges	4	3
(United States) C McHale	6	6
(Ukraine) E Svitolina	6	6
17	(Slovakia) D Cibulková	4	3
26	(France) A Cornet	6	6
Q	(Portugal) MJ Koehler	3	2
Q	(Australia) C Dellacqua	6	1	4
Q	(Croatia) A Tomljanović	3	6	6
PR	(Canada) A Wozniak	7	7^{7}
(Serbia) V Dolonc	5	6^{5}
(Germany) D Pfizenmaier	0	0
2	(Belarus) V Azarenka	6	6

Second round
13	(Serbia) A Ivanovic	6	6
PR	(Romania) A Dulgheru	2	1
(United States) C McHale	6	3	7
(Ukraine) E Svitolina	4	6	5
26	(France) A Cornet	6	6
Q	(Croatia) A Tomljanović	2	2
PR	(Canada) A Wozniak	3	1
2	(Belarus) V Azarenka	6	6

Third round
13	(Serbia) A Ivanovic	4	7	6
(United States) C McHale	6	5	4
26	(France) A Cornet	7^{7}	3	2
2	(Belarus) V Azarenka	6^{2}	6	6

Fourth round
13	(Serbia) A Ivanovic	6	3	4
2	(Belarus) V Azarenka	4	6	6

== Championship match statistics ==
Category	(United States) S. Williams	(Belarus) Azarenka
1st serve %	58/101 (57%)	56/99 (57%)
1st serve points won	44 of 58 = 76%	31 of 56 = 55%
2nd serve points won	20 of 43 = 47%	23 of 43 = 53%
Total service points won	64 of 101 = 63.37%	54 of 99 = 54.55%
Aces	9	2
Double faults	5	7
Winners	36	17
Unforced errors	35	27
Net points won	3 of 9 = 33%	4 of 6 = 67%
Break points converted	7 of 12 = 58%	4 of 8 = 50%
Return points won	45 of 99 = 45%	37 of 101 = 37%
Total points won	109	91

Preceded by 2013 Wimbledon Championships – Women's singles	Grand Slam women's singles	Succeeded by 2014 Australian Open – Women's singles
