= 2011 Copa Sony Ericsson Colsanitas – Doubles =

Tennis tournament

Doubles
- 2011 Copa Sony Ericsson Colsanitas

Final
- Champions: (Romania) Edina Gallovits-Hall (Spain) Anabel Medina Garrigues
- Runners-up: (Canada) Sharon Fichman (Spain) Laura Pous Tió
- Score: 2–6, 7–6^{(8–6)}, [11–9]

Details
- Draw: 16
- Seeds: 4

Events
Singles	Doubles
← 2010 ·	Copa Sony Ericsson Colsanitas	· 2012 →

Gisela Dulko and Edina Gallovits-Hall were the defending champions, but Dulko decided to not participate.
As a result, Gallovits-Hall played with Anabel Medina Garrigues and they won this tournament, by defeating Sharon Fichman and Laura Pous Tió 2–6, 7–6^{(8–6)}, [11–9].

== Seeds ==
1. (Romania) Edina Gallovits-Hall / (Spain) Anabel Medina Garrigues (champions)
2. (Greece) Eleni Daniilidou / (Germany) Jasmin Wöhr (semifinals)
3. (Spain) Lourdes Domínguez Lino / (Spain) Arantxa Parra Santonja (first round)
4. (Ukraine) Mariya Koryttseva / (Romania) Ioana Raluca Olaru (quarterfinals)

== Draw ==
=== Key ===
- Q = Qualifier
- WC = Wild card
- LL = Lucky loser
- Alt = Alternate
- SE = Special exempt
- PR = Protected ranking
- ITF = ITF entry
- JE = Junior exempt
- w/o = Walkover
- r = Retired
- d = Defaulted
- SR = Special ranking

=== Draw ===
First round
1	(Romania) E Gallovits-Hall (Spain) A Medina Garrigues	6	7
(United States) C Fusano (United States) C Nagle	1	5
WC	(Spain) I Ferrer Suárez (Bulgaria) A Naydenova	3	4
(Czech Republic) E Birnerová (Slovenia) A Klepač	6	6
3	(Spain) L Domínguez Lino (Spain) A Parra Santonja	6^{5}	6	[11]
(United States) L Lee-Waters (United States) M Moulton-Levy	7	0	[13]
(Russia) A Rodionova (Germany) K Wörle	3	3
WC	(Peru) B Botto (Colombia) M Duque Mariño	6	6
(Canada) S Fichman (Spain) L Pous Tió	7	6
(Argentina) M Irigoyen (Argentina) F Molinero	5	4
(Austria) Y Meusburger (France) A Védy	3	2
4	(Ukraine) M Koryttseva (Romania) IR Olaru	6	6
(Russia) N Bratchikova (Russia) A Panova	3	5
(Romania) I-C Begu (Romania) E Bogdan	6	7
(China) W Liu (China) S Sun	2	1
2	(Greece) E Daniilidou (Germany) J Wöhr	6	6

Quarterfinals
1	(Romania) E Gallovits-Hall (Spain) A Medina Garrigues	6	6
(Czech Republic) E Birnerová (Slovenia) A Klepač	4	2
(United States) L Lee-Waters (United States) M Moulton-Levy	w/o
WC	(Peru) B Botto (Colombia) M Duque Mariño
(Canada) S Fichman (Spain) L Pous Tió	6	6^{6}	[10]
4	(Ukraine) M Koryttseva (Romania) IR Olaru	3	7	[6]
(Romania) I-C Begu (Romania) E Bogdan	3	2
2	(Greece) E Daniilidou (Germany) J Wöhr	6	6

Semifinals
1	(Romania) E Gallovits-Hall (Spain) A Medina Garrigues	6	6
(United States) L Lee-Waters (United States) M Moulton-Levy	2	3
(Canada) S Fichman (Spain) L Pous Tió	5	6	[10]
2	(Greece) E Daniilidou (Germany) J Wöhr	7	1	[8]

Final
1	(Romania) E Gallovits-Hall (Spain) A Medina Garrigues	2	7	[11]
(Canada) S Fichman (Spain) L Pous Tió	6	6^{6}	[9]
