= 2010 Copa BBVA-Colsanitas – Doubles =

Tennis tournament

Doubles
- 2010 Copa BBVA-Colsanitas

Final
- Champions: (Argentina) Gisela Dulko (Romania) Edina Gallovits
- Runners-up: (Ukraine) Olga Savchuk (Belarus) Anastasiya Yakimova
- Score: 6–2, 7–6^{(8–6)}

Details
- Draw: 16
- Seeds: 4

Events
Singles	Doubles
← 2009 ·	Copa Colsanitas	· 2011 →

Nuria Llagostera Vives and María José Martínez Sánchez were the defending champions; however, they chose to compete in the 2010 Dubai Tennis Championships instead.
Gisela Dulko and Edina Gallovits defeated Olga Savchuk and Anastasiya Yakimova 6–2, 7–6^{(8–6)} in the final.

== Seeds ==
1. (Ukraine) Mariya Koryttseva / (Canada) Marie-Ève Pelletier (semifinals)
2. (Argentina) Gisela Dulko / (Romania) Edina Gallovits (champions)
3. (Spain) Lourdes Domínguez Lino / (Spain) Arantxa Parra Santonja (semifinals)
4. (Canada) Sharon Fichman / (United States) Mashona Washington (quarterfinals)

== Draw ==
=== Key ===
- Q = Qualifier
- WC = Wild card
- LL = Lucky loser
- Alt = Alternate
- SE = Special exempt
- PR = Protected ranking
- ITF = ITF entry
- JE = Junior exempt
- w/o = Walkover
- r = Retired
- d = Defaulted
- SR = Special ranking

=== Draws ===
First round
1	(Ukraine) M Koryttseva (Canada) M-È Pelletier	6	6
(Brazil) MF Alves (Austria) M Klaffner	4	0
(Czech Republic) P Cetkovská (Czech Republic) K Zakopalová	3	6^{4}
WC	(Peru) B Botto (Colombia) M Duque Mariño	6	7
4	(Canada) S Fichman (United States) M Washington	6	6
WC	(Slovakia) M Frantová (Colombia) K Ramírez Rivera	1	1
(Spain) E Cabeza Candela (Italy) C Dentoni	4	2
(Ukraine) O Savchuk (Belarus) A Yakimova	6	6
(Bolivia) MF Álvarez (Colombia) KE Castiblanco Duarte	5	2
(Russia) N Bratchikova (France) L Thorpe	7	6
(United States) L Albanese (Germany) A Kerber	4	2
3	(Spain) L Domínguez Lino (Spain) A Parra Santonja	6	6
(Austria) P Mayr (Slovenia) M Zec Peškirič
(Slovenia) P Hercog (France) P Parmentier	w/o
(Colombia) C Castaño (Russia) A Jidkova	2	4
2	(Argentina) G Dulko (Romania) E Gallovits	6	6

Quarterfinals
1	(Ukraine) M Koryttseva (Canada) M-È Pelletier	6	6
WC	(Peru) B Botto (Colombia) M Duque Mariño	4	2
4	(Canada) S Fichman (United States) M Washington	2	7	[7]
(Ukraine) O Savchuk (Belarus) A Yakimova	6	6^{5}	[10]
(Russia) N Bratchikova (France) L Thorpe	3	3
3	(Spain) L Domínguez Lino (Spain) A Parra Santonja	6	6
(Slovenia) P Hercog (France) P Parmentier	6	4
2	(Argentina) G Dulko (Romania) E Gallovits	7	6

Semifinals
1	(Ukraine) M Koryttseva (Canada) M-È Pelletier	2	1
(Ukraine) O Savchuk (Belarus) A Yakimova	6	6
3	(Spain) L Domínguez Lino (Spain) A Parra Santonja	6^{3}	2
2	(Argentina) G Dulko (Romania) E Gallovits	7	6

Finals
(Ukraine) O Savchuk (Belarus) A Yakimova	2	6^{6}
2	(Argentina) G Dulko (Romania) E Gallovits	6	7
