= 2015 US Open – Women's singles qualifying =

Women's singles qualifying
- 2015 US Open

Events
Singles	men	women		boys	girls
Doubles	men	women	mixed	boys	girls
WC Singles	men	women	quad
WC Doubles	men	women	quad
Legends	men	women	mixed

Qualification
Singles	men	women
- US Open

== Seeds ==
1. (Russia) Margarita Gasparyan (second round)
2. (Kazakhstan) Yaroslava Shvedova (qualifying competition)
3. (United Kingdom) Johanna Konta (qualified)
4. (Belgium) An-Sophie Mestach (second round)
5. (China) Duan Yingying (second round)
6. (Ukraine) Kateryna Bondarenko (qualified)
7. (Russia) Elizaveta Kulichkova (qualified)
8. (Netherlands) Kiki Bertens (qualified)
9. (Slovakia) Jana Čepelová (second round)
10. (Czech Republic) Kristýna Plíšková (first round)
11. (Latvia) Jeļena Ostapenko (qualified)
12. (Chinese Taipei) Hsieh Su-wei (second round)
13. (Romania) Patricia Maria Țig (second round)
14. (Belarus) Aliaksandra Sasnovich (qualified)
15. (Russia) Alla Kudryavtseva (qualifying competition)
16. (United States) Anna Tatishvili (qualified)
17. (Netherlands) Richèl Hogenkamp (first round)
18. (Japan) Nao Hibino (qualifying competition)
19. (Spain) María Teresa Torró Flor (second round)
20. (China) Zhu Lin (first round)
21. (Germany) Laura Siegemund (qualified)
22. (Switzerland) Romina Oprandi (second round)
23. (Croatia) Donna Vekić (second round)
24. (China) Wang Yafan (second round)
25. (Spain) Sílvia Soler Espinosa (second round)
26. (Russia) Alexandra Panova (qualified)
27. (Russia) Daria Kasatkina (qualifying competition, lucky loser)
28. (Switzerland) Stefanie Vögele (first round)
29. (Israel) Shahar Pe'er (first round)
30. (Czech Republic) Andrea Hlaváčková (first round)
31. (Japan) Risa Ozaki (first round)
32. (Croatia) Petra Martić (qualifying competition)

== Qualifiers ==
1. (United States) Jessica Pegula
2. (Croatia) Tereza Mrdeža
3. (United Kingdom) Johanna Konta
4. (Greece) Maria Sakkari
5. (Estonia) Anett Kontaveit
6. (Ukraine) Kateryna Bondarenko
7. (Russia) Elizaveta Kulichkova
8. (Netherlands) Kiki Bertens
9. (Russia) Alexandra Panova
10. (Ukraine) Kateryna Kozlova
11. (Latvia) Jeļena Ostapenko
12. (Germany) Laura Siegemund
13. (Japan) Mayo Hibi
14. (Belarus) Aliaksandra Sasnovich
15. (United States) Shelby Rogers
16. (United States) Anna Tatishvili

== Lucky losers ==
1. (Russia) Daria Kasatkina

== Draw ==
Key

- Q = Qualifier
- WC = Wild card
- LL = Lucky loser
- Alt = Alternate
- ITF = ITF entry
- PR = Protected ranking
- SR = Special ranking
- SE = Special exempt
- JE = Junior exempt
- JR = Junior Accelerator Programme entrant
- CO = College Accelerator Programme entrant
- NG = Next Gen Accelerator Program entrant
- w/o = Walkover
- r = Retired
- d = Defaulted

=== First qualifier ===
First round
1	(Russia) Margarita Gasparyan	6	6
(Russia) Marina Melnikova	1	1
(Japan) Shuko Aoyama	1	6	4
WC	(United States) Jessica Pegula	6	3	6
(Bulgaria) Elitsa Kostova	3	5
PR	(United States) Melanie Oudin	6	7
PR	(Norway) Ulrikke Eikeri	4	3
24	(China) Wang Yafan	6	6

Second round
1	(Russia) Margarita Gasparyan	3	3
WC	(United States) Jessica Pegula	6	6
PR	(United States) Melanie Oudin	6^{2}	6	7^{7}
24	(China) Wang Yafan	7^{7}	3	6^{5}

Qualifying competition
WC	(United States) Jessica Pegula	7^{10}	6
PR	(United States) Melanie Oudin	6^{8}	0

=== Second qualifier ===
First round
2	(Kazakhstan) Yaroslava Shvedova	6	6
(France) Virginie Razzano	2	2
(China) Zhang Kailin	2	3
(France) Amandine Hesse	6	6
(Croatia) Tereza Mrdeža	7	7
(Slovakia) Kristína Kučová	5	5
WC	(United States) Raveena Kingsley	6	6
30	(Czech Republic) Andrea Hlaváčková	3	4

Second round
2	(Kazakhstan) Yaroslava Shvedova	6	6
(France) Amandine Hesse	4	3
(Croatia) Tereza Mrdeža	6	3	7
WC	(United States) Raveena Kingsley	1	6	5

Qualifying competition
2	(Kazakhstan) Yaroslava Shvedova	7	6^{8}	6^{4}
(Croatia) Tereza Mrdeža	5	7^{10}	7^{7}

=== Third qualifier ===
First round
3	(United Kingdom) Johanna Konta	7	6
(Hungary) Réka-Luca Jani	5	4
(Japan) Naomi Osaka	7^{10}	7^{7}
(United States) Katerina Stewart	6^{8}	6^{5}
(China) Yang Zhaoxuan	6	6
(Brazil) Gabriela Cé	3	4
PR	(Austria) Tamira Paszek	6	6
28	(Israel) Shahar Pe'er	2	3

Second round
3	(United Kingdom) Johanna Konta	6	6
(Japan) Naomi Osaka	4	4
(China) Yang Zhaoxuan	0	2
PR	(Austria) Tamira Paszek	6	6

Qualifying competition
3	(United Kingdom) Johanna Konta	6	3	6
PR	(Austria) Tamira Paszek	4	6	2

=== Fourth qualifier ===
First round
4	(Belgium) An-Sophie Mestach	6	5	7
(Japan) Junri Namigata	1	7	5
(Greece) Maria Sakkari	6	7^{7}
(Latvia) Anastasija Sevastova	2	6^{2}
WC	(United States) Jennifer Elie	3	0
(China) Zhang Shuai	6	6
(Argentina) Florencia Molinero	1	2
32	(Croatia) Petra Martić	6	6

Second round
4	(Belgium) An-Sophie Mestach	5	6	3
(Greece) Maria Sakkari	7	3	6
(China) Zhang Shuai	6	4	4
32	(Croatia) Petra Martić	4	6	6

Qualifying competition
(Greece) Maria Sakkari	6	6
32	(Croatia) Petra Martić	4	4

=== Fifth qualifier ===
First round
5	(China) Duan Yingying	6	7
(France) Mathilde Johansson	2	5
(United Kingdom) Naomi Broady	3	6	7^{10}
(Czech Republic) Barbora Krejčíková	6	4	6^{8}
(Liechtenstein) Stephanie Vogt	2	5
(Estonia) Anett Kontaveit	6	7
WC	(United States) Usue Maitane Arconada	0	5
19	(Spain) María Teresa Torró Flor	6	7

Second round
5	(China) Duan Yingying	4	6^{2}
(United Kingdom) Naomi Broady	6	7^{7}
(Estonia) Anett Kontaveit	7^{7}	6
19	(Spain) María Teresa Torró Flor	6^{4}	2

Qualifying competition
(United Kingdom) Naomi Broady	6^{4}	6	4
(Estonia) Anett Kontaveit	7^{7}	2	6

=== Sixth qualifier ===
First round
6	(Ukraine) Kateryna Bondarenko	6	6
(Japan) Miyu Kato	2	0
(Turkey) İpek Soylu	5	7	6
(United States) Maria Sanchez	7	5	1
(Japan) Eri Hozumi	6	6
(Turkey) Çağla Büyükakçay	2	2
(Czech Republic) Tereza Martincová	3	4
18	(Japan) Nao Hibino	6	6

Second round
6	(Ukraine) Kateryna Bondarenko	7	6
(Turkey) İpek Soylu	5	2
(Japan) Eri Hozumi	2	5
18	(Japan) Nao Hibino	6	7

Qualifying competition
6	(Ukraine) Kateryna Bondarenko	6	6
18	(Japan) Nao Hibino	1	1

=== Seventh qualifier ===
First round
7	(Russia) Elizaveta Kulichkova	6	6
(United States) Jennifer Brady	2	4
(Belgium) Elise Mertens	3	6	4
PR	(Italy) Nastassja Burnett	6	3	6
(United States) Taylor Townsend	6	7
(France) Pauline Parmentier	2	5
(Argentina) María Irigoyen	2	3
27	(Russia) Daria Kasatkina	6	6

Second round
7	(Russia) Elizaveta Kulichkova	6	6
PR	(Italy) Nastassja Burnett	3	3
(United States) Taylor Townsend	2	2
27	(Russia) Daria Kasatkina	6	6

Qualifying competition
7	(Russia) Elizaveta Kulichkova	6	6
27	(Russia) Daria Kasatkina	2	4

=== Eighth qualifier ===
First round
8	(Netherlands) Kiki Bertens	6	6
WC	(United States) Robin Anderson	2	4
(Netherlands) Lesley Kerkhove	4	1
(China) Han Xinyun	6	6
WC	(United States) Bernarda Pera	6	4	2
(Czech Republic) Renata Voráčová	2	6	6
(Chinese Taipei) Chan Yung-jan	6	7
31	(Japan) Risa Ozaki	3	5

Second round
8	(Netherlands) Kiki Bertens	6	6
(China) Han Xinyun	2	4
(Czech Republic) Renata Voráčová	6	6
(Chinese Taipei) Chan Yung-jan	3	2

Qualifying competition
8	(Netherlands) Kiki Bertens	6	6
(Czech Republic) Renata Voráčová	0	4

=== Ninth qualifier ===
First round
9	(Slovakia) Jana Čepelová	6	6
(China) Lu Jiajing	4	2
WC	(United States) Claire Liu	4	7	6
(Paraguay) Verónica Cepede Royg	6	5	2
(Uzbekistan) Sabina Sharipova	2	6	0
(Poland) Paula Kania	6	1	6
(Italy) Alberta Brianti	3	3
26	(Russia) Alexandra Panova	6	6

Second round
9	(Slovakia) Jana Čepelová	6^{4}	4
WC	(United States) Claire Liu	7^{7}	6
(Poland) Paula Kania	2	1
26	(Russia) Alexandra Panova	6	6

Qualifying competition
WC	(United States) Claire Liu	4	1
26	(Russia) Alexandra Panova	6	6

=== Tenth qualifier ===
First round
10	(Czech Republic) Kristýna Plíšková	5	6^{5}
(Ukraine) Maryna Zanevska	7	7^{7}
(Czech Republic) Kateřina Vaňková	6^{6}	4
(Uzbekistan) Nigina Abduraimova	7^{8}	6
(China) Xu Yifan	3	7	2
(Ukraine) Kateryna Kozlova	6	5	6
(Poland) Katarzyna Piter	6	2	6
20	(China) Zhu Lin	3	6	3

Second round
(Ukraine) Maryna Zanevska	6	6
(Uzbekistan) Nigina Abduraimova	3	4
(Ukraine) Kateryna Kozlova	6	6
(Poland) Katarzyna Piter	3	4

Qualifying competition
(Ukraine) Maryna Zanevska	1	1
(Ukraine) Kateryna Kozlova	6	6

=== Eleventh qualifier ===
First round
11	(Latvia) Jeļena Ostapenko	7^{9}	6
(Japan) Hiroko Kuwata	6^{7}	4
(United States) Julia Boserup	6	3	1
(Israel) Julia Glushko	4	6	6
(Japan) Kimiko Date-Krumm	6	1	4
(United States) Catherine Bellis	4	6	6
WC	(United States) Tornado Alicia Black	4	0
22	(Switzerland) Romina Oprandi	6	6

Second round
11	(Latvia) Jeļena Ostapenko	2	6	6
(Israel) Julia Glushko	6	0	4
(United States) Catherine Bellis	7	7
22	(Switzerland) Romina Oprandi	5	5

Qualifying competition
11	(Latvia) Jeļena Ostapenko	6	6
(United States) Catherine Bellis	3	2

=== Twelfth qualifier ===
First round
12	(Chinese Taipei) Hsieh Su-wei	6	5	6
(France) Stéphanie Foretz	2	7	4
(France) Alizé Lim	6	6
(Australia) Anastasia Rodionova	3	4
(Sweden) Rebecca Peterson	6	7^{8}
(Austria) Patricia Mayr-Achleitner	4	6^{6}
(Netherlands) Cindy Burger	3	6	1
21	(Germany) Laura Siegemund	6	4	6

Second round
12	(Chinese Taipei) Hsieh Su-wei	5	6^{1}
(France) Alizé Lim	7	7^{7}
(Sweden) Rebecca Peterson	6^{1}	5
21	(Germany) Laura Siegemund	7^{7}	7

Qualifying competition
(France) Alizé Lim	0	0^{r}
21	(Germany) Laura Siegemund	6	2

=== Thirteenth qualifier ===
First round
13	(Romania) Patricia Maria Țig	6	6
(Russia) Ekaterina Bychkova	4	2
PR	(United States) Edina Gallovits-Hall	6	1	2
(Japan) Mayo Hibi	3	6	6
(South Korea) Han Na-lae	4	4
(Romania) Sorana Cîrstea	6	6
(Japan) Riko Sawayanagi	6	5	4
23	(Croatia) Donna Vekić	3	7	6

Second round
13	(Romania) Patricia Maria Țig	6	4	3
(Japan) Mayo Hibi	4	6	6
(Romania) Sorana Cîrstea	7^{7}	2	6
23	(Croatia) Donna Vekić	6^{4}	6	4

Qualifying competition
(Japan) Mayo Hibi	6	6
(Romania) Sorana Cîrstea	4	4

=== Fourteenth qualifier ===
First round
14	(Belarus) Aliaksandra Sasnovich	6	6
PR	(Romania) Mihaela Buzărnescu	4	2
(Spain) Paula Badosa Gibert	7^{7}	2	6
(Tunisia) Ons Jabeur	6^{2}	6	4
(Japan) Misa Eguchi	6	6
(France) Julie Coin	2	4
(Ukraine) Anhelina Kalinina	6	3	1
25	(Spain) Sílvia Soler Espinosa	3	6	6

Second round
14	(Belarus) Aliaksandra Sasnovich	2	6	6
(Spain) Paula Badosa Gibert	6	3	1
(Japan) Misa Eguchi	2	6	6
25	(Spain) Sílvia Soler Espinosa	6	3	0

Qualifying competition
14	(Belarus) Aliaksandra Sasnovich	6^{4}	6	6
(Japan) Misa Eguchi	7^{7}	2	4

=== Fifteenth qualifier ===
First round
15	(Russia) Alla Kudryavtseva	7	2	6
(United States) Alexa Glatch	5	6	2
(Thailand) Luksika Kumkhum	7	3	1
WC	(United States) Victoria Duval	5	6	6
(United States) Shelby Rogers	6	6
(United States) Grace Min	4	3
(Luxembourg) Mandy Minella	6	7
29	(Switzerland) Stefanie Vögele	2	5

Second round
15	(Russia) Alla Kudryavtseva	7^{7}	4	6
WC	(United States) Victoria Duval	6^{5}	6	0
(United States) Shelby Rogers	6	6
(Luxembourg) Mandy Minella	2	3

Qualifying competition
15	(Russia) Alla Kudryavtseva	6	2	4
(United States) Shelby Rogers	1	6	6

=== Sixteenth qualifier ===
First round
16	(United States) Anna Tatishvili	6	6
Alt	(Canada) Gabriela Dabrowski	4	2
(Thailand) Varatchaya Wongteanchai	1	2
(Spain) Laura Pous Tió	6	6
(Chinese Taipei) Chang Kai-chen	2	7	3
(Belgium) Ysaline Bonaventure	6	5	6
(Mexico) Marcela Zacarías	5	6	6
17	(Netherlands) Richèl Hogenkamp	7	2	3

Second round
16	(United States) Anna Tatishvili	6	6
(Spain) Laura Pous Tió	0	0
(Belgium) Ysaline Bonaventure	7	4	6
(Mexico) Marcela Zacarías	5	6	4

Qualifying competition
16	(United States) Anna Tatishvili	6	0	6
(Belgium) Ysaline Bonaventure	1	6	2
