= Carla Suárez Navarro =

Spanish tennis player (born 1988)

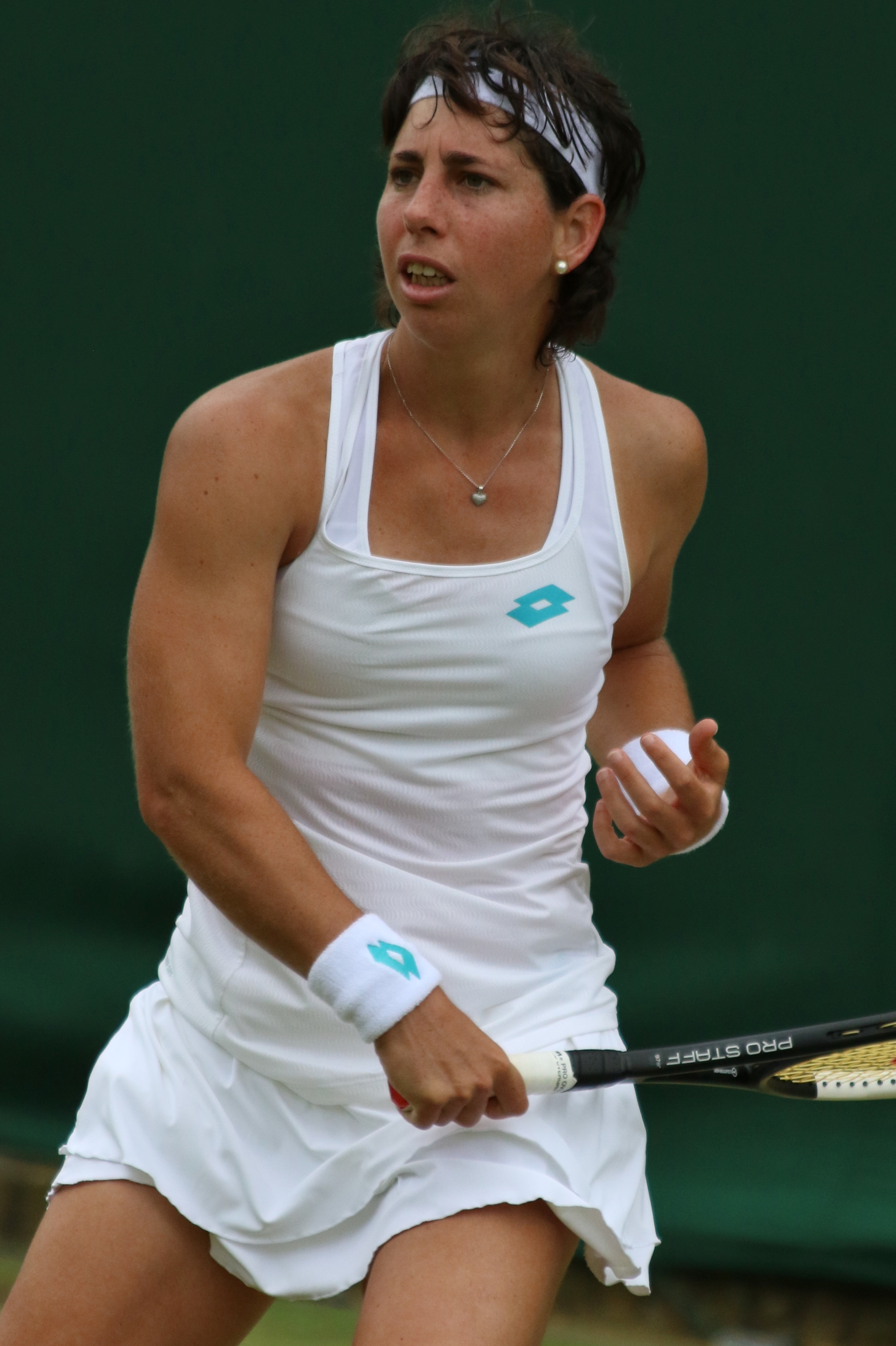
- Suárez Navarro at the 2019 Wimbledon Championships
- Country (sports): Spain
- Residence: Barcelona
- Born: 3 September 1988 (age 37) Las Palmas de Gran Canaria
- Height: 1.62 m (5 ft 4 in)
- Turned pro: 2003
- Retired: 2021
- Plays: Right (one-handed backhand)
- Coach: Marc Casabo; Oscar Serrano
- Prize money: US$ 11,920,116

Singles
- Career record: 516–345
- Career titles: 2
- Highest ranking: No. 6 (29 February 2016)

Grand Slam singles results
- Australian Open: QF (2009, 2016, 2018)
- French Open: QF (2008, 2014)
- Wimbledon: 4R (2013, 2016, 2019)
- US Open: QF (2013, 2018)

Other tournaments
- Olympic Games: 3R (2016)

Doubles
- Career record: 138–122
- Career titles: 3
- Highest ranking: No. 11 (27 April 2015)

Grand Slam doubles results
- Australian Open: QF (2013)
- French Open: SF (2014)
- Wimbledon: 3R (2013, 2014)
- US Open: 3R (2014)

Other doubles tournaments
- Tour Finals: F (2015)
- Olympic Games: QF (2016)

Team competitions
- Fed Cup: 19–12

Carla Suárez Navarro (Spanish pronunciation: [ˈkaɾla ˈswaɾeθ naˈβaro]; born 3 September 1988) is a Spanish former professional tennis player. A former top 10 singles player, she reached a career-high singles ranking of world No. 6 on 29 February 2016, and a best WTA doubles ranking of 11, on 27 April 2015, and won two singles and three doubles titles on the WTA Tour.

She first came to prominence by reaching the quarterfinals of the 2008 French Open as a qualifier, in what was her first appearance in the main draw of a Grand Slam tournament. That year she also began representing Spain in the 2008 Fed Cup. She reached another six Grand Slam quarterfinals in her career. These events were the 2009 Australian Open, where she defeated Venus Williams en route, the 2013 US Open, where she lost to eventual champion Serena Williams, the 2014 French Open, where she lost in three sets to Eugenie Bouchard, the 2016 Australian Open, where she lost to Agnieszka Radwańska, the 2018 Australian Open, where she was defeated by eventual champion Caroline Wozniacki, and the 2018 US Open, where she lost to Madison Keys.

In September 2020, she was diagnosed with Hodgkin lymphoma just months after announcing her retirement from tennis. The following year, she was declared cancer-free and returned to the tour.

== Personal life ==
Suárez Navarro was born in the Canary Islands to handball player José Luís Suárez and former gymnast Loli Navarro. She started playing tennis when she was 9 and moved to Barcelona in 2007 in order to train at the Pro-Ab Team Tennis Academy. She admires Steffi Graf, Lleyton Hewitt, Justine Henin and Michael Jordan. She is in a relationship with Spanish football player Olga García. On June 2, 2023, she gave birth to twin daughters.

== Career ==
=== 2008–2009 ===
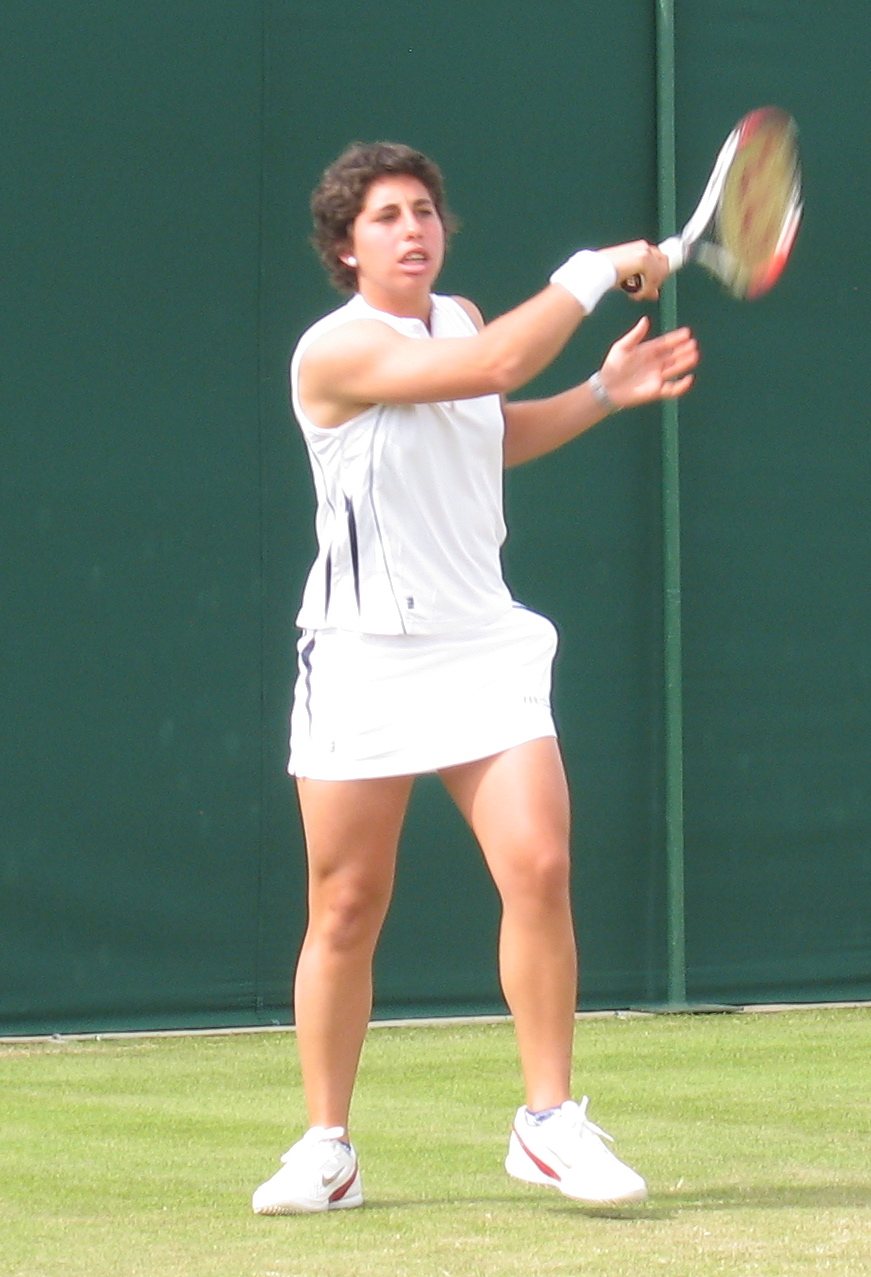
Suárez playing at the 2008 Wimbledon Championships

At the French Open, Suárez Navarro reached the quarterfinals of her first Grand Slam main-draw tournament. After three qualifying matches she defeated former world No. 1, Amélie Mauresmo, in the second round 6–3, 6–4, Australian Casey Dellacqua in the third round, and 26th-seeded Italian Flavia Pennetta in the fourth round 6–3, 6–2. Suárez Navarro then lost to third-seeded Jelena Janković in the quarterfinals. At Wimbledon, she lost to second-seeded Janković in the second round, also in straight sets.

Suárez Navarro reached the second Grand Slam quarterfinal of her career at the 2009 Australian Open before being defeated by Elena Dementieva, 6–2, 6–2. She upset Venus Williams in the second round 2–6, 6–3, 7–5. This was her first win over a top-10 player.

In March, Suárez Navarro reached her first final on the WTA Tour at the Andalucia Tennis Experience, a clay court event in Marbella, Spain. She lost to Jelena Janković in the final.

At Roland Garros seeded 22, she defeated Edina Gallovits 6–1, 6–4 and Lucie Hradecká 6–2, 6–4, before losing to Victoria Azarenka in the third round.

At Wimbledon, Suárez Navarro defeated No. 25 Kaia Kanepi in the first round and Ekaterina Makarova in the second. She faced defending champion Venus Williams for the first time since the 2009 Australian Open but was unable to repeat the upset win, losing 0–6, 4–6.

=== 2010 ===
Suárez Navarro had a good start to 2010, making the second round of the Auckland Open before losing to top seed Flavia Pennetta, in straight sets. She then made the quarterfinal of the Hobart International losing to No. 2 seed Shahar Pe'er in a close three-setter.

At the Australian Open, Suárez Navarro made it to the third round before losing to top seed, the defending (and eventual) champion Serena Williams, 0–6, 3–6.

She was upset in the first round of the Copa Colsanitas by world No. 198, Kristina Antoniychuk, 1–6, 4–6, then made it to the semifinals of the Mexican Open in Acapulco before losing to Polona Hercog 3–6, 5–7.

Unseeded at the Indian Wells Open, Suárez Navarro reached the fourth round, losing to Alisa Kleybanova 6–2, 6–7, 4–6. Along the way, she gained one of the biggest wins of her career by defeating world No. 3 and top seed, Svetlana Kuznetsova, 6–4, 4–6, 6–1 in the second round.

She reached the final of the Andalucia Tennis Experience in Marbella for the second year in a row, losing to Flavia Pennetta 2–6, 6–4, 3–6.

Suarez Navarro suffered an ankle injury at the tournament in Fes, Morocco. She returned to play in the French Open, losing her first-round match to Olga Govortsova 6–7, 1–6, she remained sidelined until the US Open.

=== 2011 ===
Carla began the season at Auckland. As the ninth seed, she was upset in round two by Heather Watson. She also lost early in Hobart to Alberta Brianti.

Going into the Australian Open, she defeated American Christina McHale but lost to eventual titlist Kim Clijsters of Belgium in the following round. Next, she represented Spain at the Fed Cup against Estonia in Tallinn, where she had a 1–1 record, getting past Anett Kontaveit but falling to Kaia Kanepi.

Then, Suárez followed an early loss in Paris with a semifinal and a quarterfinal, in Bogotá and Acapulco, respectively. An elbow injury caused her to stop playing for two and a half months and withdraw from Roland Garros.

She returned to the competition at the Open de Marseille, where she beat Sun Shengnan and Aleksandra Wozniak to make the quarterfinals, but was beaten by home crowd favourite Pauline Parmentier.

She failed to qualify for Wimbledon, losing to Ekaterina Ivanova in round two.

In early September, Suárez reached round four of the US Open for the first time, defeating Mathilde Johansson, Simona Halep and compatriot Sílvia Soler Espinosa. However, her run was ended by Andrea Petkovic.

=== 2012: Olympics debut ===
Carla Suárez Navarro was impressive in the French Open, reaching the third round. In the first round, Suárez Navarro comfortably beat Tamarine Tanasugarn, 6–0, 6–2. In the second, she faced Sesil Karatantcheva of Kazakhstan, and beat her 4–6, 6–4, 6–1. In the third round, she lost to Yaroslava Shvedova, also from Kazakhstan, who had just returned from an injury.

At Wimbledon, Carla Suárez Navarro only made it to the first round, but it was against fifth seed Samantha Stosur of Australia, she was defeated 1–6, 3–6.

At the Italiacom Open, she reached the quarterfinals, losing to Laura Robson 4–6, 6–2, 3–6.

At the London Olympics, she beat Samantha Stosur in a thrilling first-round match, 3–6, 7–5, 10–8, avenging her first round defeat to the Australian at Wimbledon the previous month.

=== 2015: Top 10 ranking ===
At the Australian Open she lost in the first round to Carina Witthöft in straight sets. At the Indian Wells Open, she reached the quarterfinals before losing to Simona Halep in three sets. Her good form on the U.S. hardcourts continued with a run to her first Premier Mandatory final at Miami. She defeated Agnieszka Radwańska, Venus Williams and Andrea Petkovic before losing, 2–6, 0–6, in the final to Serena Williams. Despite this defeat she entered the top ten of the world rankings for the first time in her career. Another good run at the Madrid Open resulted in a quarterfinal defeat to Williams, again in straight sets. In Rome at the Italian Open, she reached her first final at Premier 5 level. She recorded three victories over top-ten players at the same event for the first time, with victories over Eugenie Bouchard, Petra Kvitová and Simona Halep before losing to Maria Sharapova in three sets.

At the French Open she was seeded eighth. She lost to Jeļena Ostapenko in the first round of Wimbledon that year, and her results for the rest of the year were inauspicious apart from reaching the quarterfinals in Moscow in October and a crushing 6–0, 6–0 victory over an injured Andrea Petkovic at Zhuhai in November. Carla ended the year ranked 13th.

=== 2016: Australian Open quarterfinal, top 10 return, first Premier 5 title, career-high ranking as world No. 6 ===
Suárez Navarro made a good start to the year. She reached the semifinals at Brisbane, losing to Angelique Kerber, and the quarterfinals of the Australian Open, losing to Agnieszka Radwańska. As a result, she moved back up to world No. 8 on February 1. She then defeated Jelena Janković in Spain's Fed Cup tie against Serbia.

At the Dubai Tennis Championships, she received a first round bye but fell to eventual semifinalist Caroline Garcia. Her next tournament was the Qatar Open where she also received a first-round bye and defeated Donna Vekić, Timea Bacsinszky, Elena Vesnina and Agnieszka Radwańska en route to the final, ensuring a new career-high ranking of world No. 6. She then avenged her first round loss to Jeļena Ostapenko in the previous year's Wimbledon with a three set win over Ostapenko, earning her first Premier title and her biggest title to date.

At the 2016 Summer Olympics, she reached the third round, beating Ana Ivanovic and Ana Konjuh.

=== 2021: Comeback and retirement farewell tour ===
In April 2021, Suárez Navarro announced that her cancer was in complete remission, and that she would commence a farewell tour beginning at Roland-Garros and culminating in a final US Open appearance.

At the delayed 2020 Tokyo Olympics, she again reached the second round, where she was defeated by fifth seed Karolina Plíšková.

Suárez Navarro retired after Spain's elimination from the Billie Jean King Cup Finals. Her final matches in singles and doubles took place during Spain's previous tie against Slovakia.

== Post-retirement ==
In January 2025, Suárez Navarro was named as captain of the Spanish Billie Jean King Cup team.

== Playing style ==
Suárez Navarro uses a single-handed backhand, unlike most female players of her era. She has said in interviews that her favorite shot is her cross-court backhand and that her favourite surfaces are clay and hard. Frew McMillan has said, "There's something of Justine Henin about her game. She has a great variety of shots."

== Apparel and equipment ==
Suárez Navarro wears Lotto clothing and shoes and uses Wilson racquets.

== Career statistics ==
=== Grand Slam performance timelines ===
Key
| W | F | SF | QF | #R | RR | Q# | DNQ | A | NH |

(W) winner; (F) finalist; (SF) semifinalist; (QF) quarterfinalist; (#R) rounds 4, 3, 2, 1; (RR) round-robin stage; (Q#) qualification round; (DNQ) did not qualify; (A) absent; (NH) not held; (SR) strike rate (events won / competed); (W–L) win–loss record.
To avoid confusion and double counting, these charts are updated at the conclusion of a tournament or when the player's participation has ended.

==== Singles ====
| Tournament | 2007 | 2008 | 2009 | 2010 | 2011 | 2012 | 2013 | 2014 | 2015 | 2016 | 2017 | 2018 | 2019 | 2020 | 2021 | SR | W–L | Win % |
|---|---|---|---|---|---|---|---|---|---|---|---|---|---|---|---|---|---|---|
| Australian Open | A | Q2 | QF | 3R | 2R | 2R | 3R | 3R | 1R | QF | 2R | QF | 2R | 2R | A | 0 / 12 | 23–12 | 66% |
| French Open | A | QF | 3R | 1R | A | 3R | 4R | QF | 3R | 4R | 4R | 2R | 3R | A | 1R | 0 / 12 | 26–12 | 70% |
| Wimbledon | A | 2R | 3R | A | Q2 | 1R | 4R | 2R | 1R | 4R | 2R | 3R | 4R | NH | 1R | 0 / 11 | 16–11 | 59% |
| US Open | Q2 | 1R | 2R | 1R | 4R | 2R | QF | 3R | 1R | 4R | 4R | QF | 1R | A | 1R | 0 / 13 | 21–13 | 64% |
| Win–loss | 0–0 | 5–3 | 9–4 | 2–3 | 4–2 | 4–4 | 12–4 | 9–4 | 2–4 | 13–4 | 8–4 | 11–4 | 6–4 | 1–1 | 0–3 | 0 / 48 | 86–48 | 65% |

==== Doubles ====
| Tournament | 2008 | 2009 | 2010 | 2011 | 2012 | 2013 | 2014 | 2015 | ... | 2021 | SR | W–L | Win % |
|---|---|---|---|---|---|---|---|---|---|---|---|---|---|
| Australian Open | A | 1R | 1R | 1R | 2R | QF | A | 2R | | A | 0 / 6 | 5–6 | 45% |
| French Open | A | 1R | A | A | 1R | 1R | SF | 1R | | A | 0 / 5 | 4–5 | 44% |
| Wimbledon | 1R | 2R | A | A | 2R | 3R | 3R | 2R | | A | 0 / 6 | 6–6 | 50% |
| US Open | 1R | 2R | A | 1R | 2R | 1R | 3R | 2R | | 1R | 0 / 8 | 5–8 | 46% |
| Win–loss | 0–2 | 2–4 | 0–1 | 0–2 | 3–4 | 4–4 | 8–3 | 3–4 | | 0–1 | 0 / 25 | 20–25 | 45% |
