= Paula Zabala =

Colombian tennis player (born 1985)

- Full name: Paula Zabala Alvarez
- Country (sports): Colombia
- Born: 26 January 1985 (age 40); Medellín, Colombia
- Height: 1.63 m (5 ft 4 in)
- Prize money: $46,277

Singles
- Career record: 107–186
- Career titles: 0
- Highest ranking: No. 368 (22 February 2010)

Doubles
- Career record: 95–96
- Career titles: 7 ITF
- Highest ranking: No. 312 (28 December 2009)

Paula Zabala Alvarez (born 26 January 1985) is a former professional tennis player from Colombia.

== Biography ==
Born in Medellín, Zabala was based in the United States and played collegiate tennis for Florida International University.

As a professional player, she reached career-high rankings of 368 in singles and 312 in doubles. She won seven ITF titles, all in doubles. Her only WTA Tour main-draw appearance came at the 2010 Copa Colsanitas in Bogotá, where she competed as a singles wildcard and was beaten in the first round by Austria's Patricia Mayr.

Zabala played a Fed Cup doubles match for Colombia in 2010, partnering Karen Castiblanco in a win over the Bolivian pairing of María Fernanda Álvarez Terán and Maria Paula Deheza.

== ITF Circuit finals ==
$25,000 tournaments
$10,000 tournaments

=== Singles (0–2) ===
Result	No.	Date	Tournament	Surface	Opponent	Score
Loss	1.	25 May 2008	ITF Managua, Nicaragua	Hard	(Brazil) Nathália Rossi	6–3, 1–6, 4–6
Loss	2.	18 October 2009	ITF Mexico City	Hard	(United States) Macall Harkins	5–7, 4–6

=== Doubles (7–6) ===
Result	No.	Date	Tournament	Surface	Partner	Opponents	Score
Loss	1.	4 July 2004	ITF Inyo County, United States	Hard	(Ukraine) Tetiana Luzhanska	(United States) Tamara Encina (United States) Alison Ojeda	3–6, 3–6
Win	2.	18 September 2005	ITF Matamoros, Mexico	Hard	(Mexico) Daniela Múñoz Gallegos	(Serbia and Montenegro) Ana Četnik (United States) Story Tweedie-Yates	6–4, 6–4
Win	3.	7 May 2006	ITF Mazatlan, Mexico	Hard	(Mexico) Daniela Múñoz Gallegos	(Slovenia) Jelena Durisic (United States) Andrea Remynse	5–7, 6–3, 6–1
Loss	4.	22 July 2007	ITF Hamilton, Canada	Clay	(Sweden) Michaela Johansson	(Canada) Stéphanie Dubois (South Africa) Surina De Beer	w/o
Win	5.	21 June 2008	ITF Alcobaça, Portugal	Hard	(United States) Lena Litvak	(Brazil) Verena Piccolo (Australia) Alison Shemon	6–4, 6–2
Loss	6.	20 July 2008	ITF Badajoz, Spain	Hard	(Colombia) Karen Castiblanco	(France) Adeline Goncalves (Australia) Kristina Pejkovic	5–7, 5–7
Loss	7.	27 July 2008	ITF La Coruña, Spain	Hard	(Colombia) Karen Castiblanco	(Portugal) Neuza Silva (Netherlands) Nicole Thyssen	2–6, 2–6
Win	8.	20 September 2008	ITF Chihuahua, Mexico	Clay	(Mexico) Lorena Arias	(Mexico) Erika Clarke (Mexico) Daniela Múñoz Gallegos	2–6, 6–4, [10–5]
Win	9.	18 July 2009	ITF Bogotá, Colombia	Clay	(Colombia) Karen Castiblanco	(Brazil) Maria Fernanda Alves (Italy) Nicole Clerico	1–6, 6–1, [10–7]
Win	10.	3 October 2009	ITF Juárez, Mexico	Clay	(Chile) Andrea Koch Benvenuto	(Argentina) Lucía Jara Lozano (Chile) Giannina Minieri	6–0, 3–6, [10–4]
Loss	11.	17 October 2009	ITF Mexico City	Hard	(Chile) Andrea Koch Benvenuto	(Slovakia) Dominika Diešková (Mexico) Daniela Múñoz Gallegos	w/o
Loss	12.	6 November 2009	ITF Bogotá, Colombia	Clay	(Colombia) Yuliana Lizarazo	(Colombia) Karen Castiblanco (Chile) Andrea Koch Benvenuto	3–6, 1–6
Win	13.	6 December 2009	ITF Poza Rica, Mexico	Hard	(Brazil) Maria Fernanda Alves	(Italy) Alessia Camplone (Belarus) Viktoryia Kisialeva	6–2, 6–0
