= Mathilde Johansson =

French tennis player

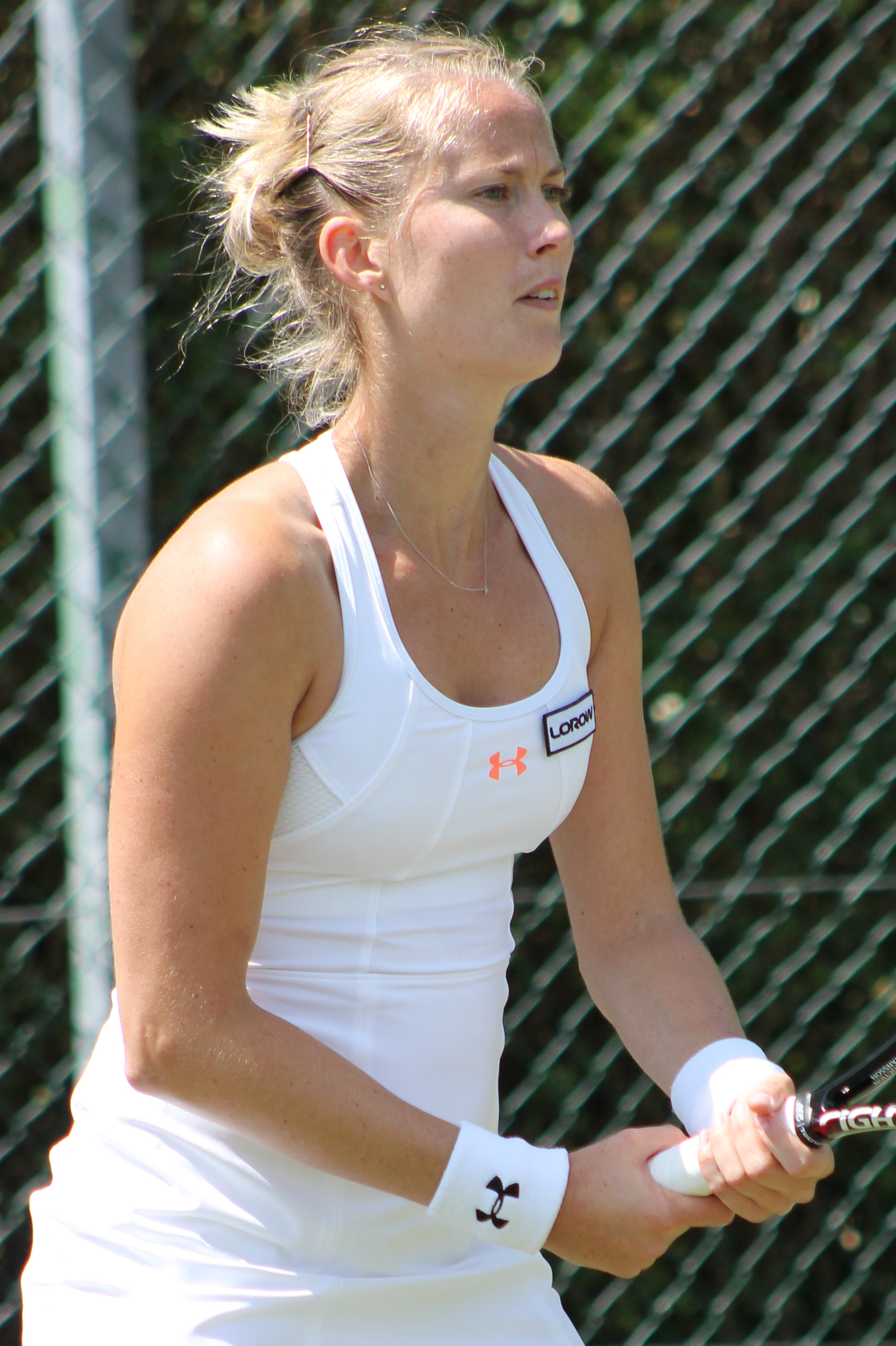
- Country (sports): France
- Residence: Boulogne Billancourt, France
- Born: 28 April 1985 (age 40) Gothenburg, Sweden
- Height: 1.73 m (5 ft 8 in)
- Turned pro: 2000
- Retired: 2016
- Plays: Right-handed (two-handed backhand)
- Prize money: $1,446,131

Singles
- Career record: 386–319
- Career titles: 14 ITF
- Highest ranking: No. 59 (6 April 2009)

Grand Slam singles results
- Australian Open: 2R (2009)
- French Open: 3R (2012)
- Wimbledon: 2R (2009, 2011, 2012, 2013)
- US Open: 1R (2007 2009, 2011, 2013)

Doubles
- Career record: 70–90
- Career titles: 1 ITF
- Highest ranking: No. 110 (10 May 2010)

Grand Slam doubles results
- Australian Open: 1R (2009)
- French Open: 2R (2007, 2008, 2009, 2013, 2016)
- Wimbledon: 1R (2011)
- US Open: 1R (2011, 2012)

Mathilde Johansson (born 28 April 1985) is a Swedish-born French former tennis player.

== Professional career ==
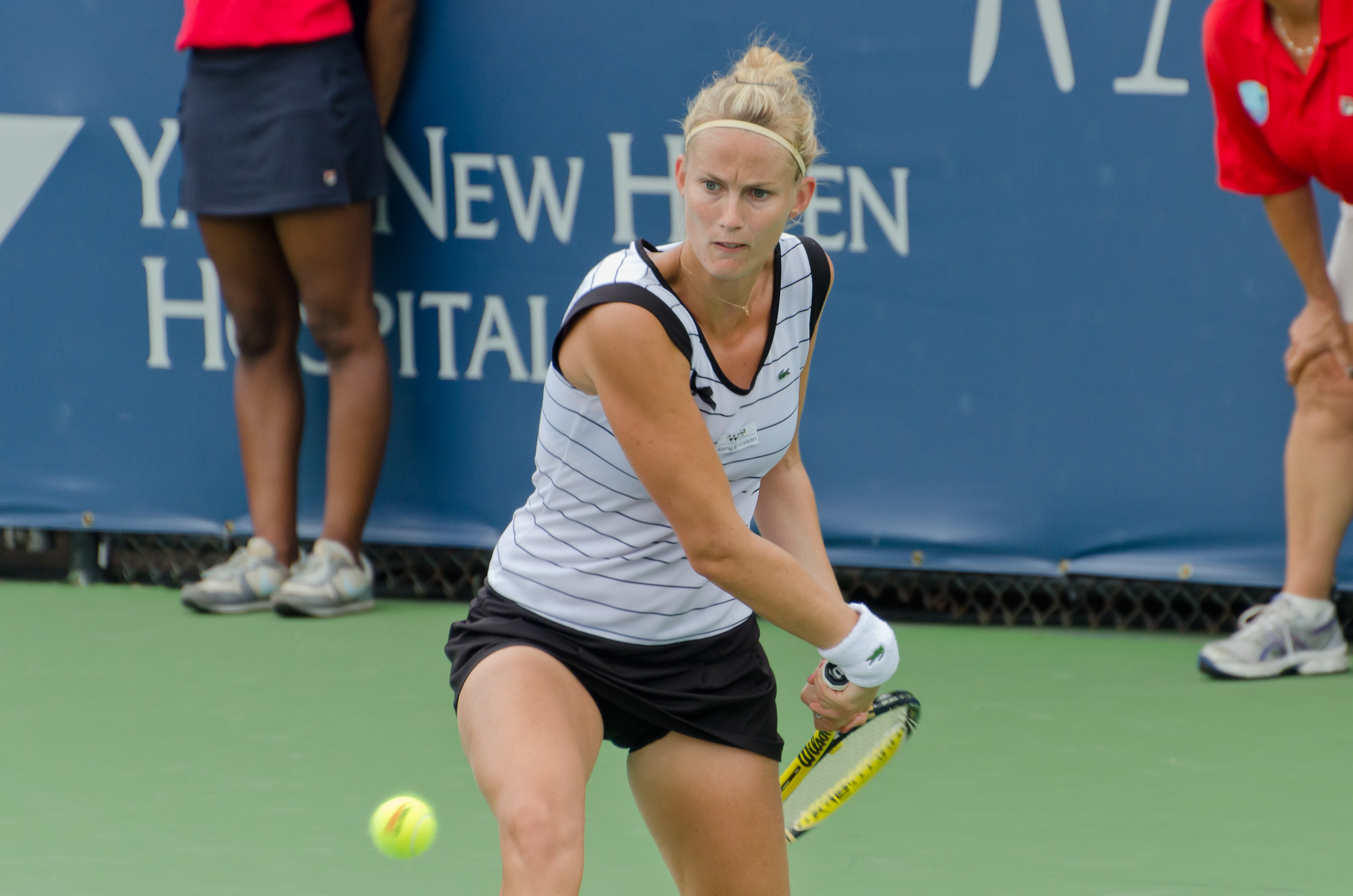
Mathilde Johansson returning a shot at the 2011 Connecticut Open qualifying tournament

She made her WTA Tour main-draw debut at the 2005 French Open, losing to sixth-seed Svetlana Kuznetsova in the first round. In 2006, she reached the second round, losing to Russian youngster Maria Kirilenko in straight sets.

In 2009, she reached two WTA Tour quarterfinals, in Acapulco and in Bogotá (where she was seeded No. 6).

In 2011, she reached her first WTA tournament final in Bogotá, losing to Lourdes Domínguez Lino in three sets.

In April 2012, as a lucky loser, Johansson reached the semifinals of the Grand Prix in Fès (Morocco), eventually falling to Laura Pous Tio. Later in May, at the French Open, she reached for the first time the third round of a major tournament, falling to Sloane Stephens. In July, Johansson reached the finals of the Swedish Open, losing to Polona Hercog, in three sets.

For one of her last tournaments in the season, she reached the quarterfinals in Guangzhou, where she was beaten by Hsieh Su-wei in straight sets. Overall in 2012, she fell in the first round ten times.

In 2016, Johansson decided to retire after the French Open singles qualifying tournament where she was beaten in the second round by Ivana Jorović.

== WTA career finals ==
=== Singles: 2 (2 runner-ups) ===
Legend Grand Slam Premier M & Premier 5 Premier International (0–2)	Finals by surface Hard (0–0) Clay (0–2) Grass (0–0) Carpet (0–0)

Result	W–L	Date	Tournament	Tier	Surface	Opponent	Score
Loss	0–1	Feb 2011	Copa Colsanitas, Bogotá	Internat.	Clay	(Spain) Lourdes Domínguez Lino	6–2, 3–6, 2–6
Loss	0–2	Jul 2012	Swedish Open	Internat.	Clay	(Slovenia) Polona Hercog	6–0, 4–6, 5–7

== ITF Circuit finals ==
=== Singles: 20 (14–6) ===
Legend $100,000 tournaments $75,000 tournaments $50,000 tournaments $25,000 tournaments $10,000 tournaments	Finals by surface Hard (5–2) Clay (9–4) Grass (0–0) Carpet (0–0)

Result	No.	Date	Tournament	Surface	Opponent	Score
Loss	1.	24 June 2001	ITF Algiers, Algeria	Clay	(Slovakia) Zuzana Kučová	3–6, 3–6
Win	2.	1 July 2001	ITF Algiers, Algeria	Clay	(Germany) Isabel Collischönn	6–2, 6–3
Loss	2.	21 November 2004	ITF Puebla, Mexico	Hard	(Argentina) Mariana Díaz Oliva	3–6, 1–6
Win	2.	3 July 2005	ITF Mont-de-Marsan, France	Clay	(Argentina) Natalia Gussoni	3–6, 6–4, 6–4
Loss	3.	17 July 2005	ITF Vittel, France	Clay	(Sweden) Hanna Nooni	2–6, 2–6
Win	3.	30 October 2005	ITF Mexico City	Hard	(France) Florence Haring	w/o
Win	4.	5 November 2006	ITF Mexico City	Hard	(Brazil) Larissa Carvalho	6–1, 7–6^{(7)}
Win	5.	12 November 2006	ITF Mexico City	Hard	(Austria) Yvonne Meusburger	7–5, 6–2
Win	6.	10 February 2008	ITF Cali, Colombia	Clay	(Canada) Ekaterina Shulaeva	3–6, 6–0, 6–1
Win	7.	27 July 2008	ITF Pétange, Luxembourg	Clay	(Czech Republic) Renata Voráčová	2–6, 7–5, 7–5
Win	8.	13 June 2010	ITF Budapest, Hungary	Clay	(Hungary) Tímea Babos	6–7^{(4)}, 6–1, 6–0
Win	9.	20 June 2010	Montpellier Open, France	Clay	(France) Claire de Gubernatis	5–7, 6–4, 6–2
Win	10.	25 July 2010	ITF Pétange, Luxembourg	Clay	(Romania) Monica Niculescu	6–3, 6–3
Win	11.	19 September 2010	ITF Sofia, Bulgaria	Clay	(Spain) Carla Suárez Navarro	6–4, 3–1 ret.
Loss	4.	9 October 2010	ITF Jounieh, Lebanon	Clay	(Czech Republic) Petra Cetkovská	1–6, 3–6
Win	12.	18 July 2011	ITF Petange, Luxembourg	Hard	(Czech Republic) Petra Cetkovská	7–5, 6–3
Loss	5.	5 April 2015	ITF Croissy-Beaubourg, France	Hard (i)	(Russia) Margarita Gasparyan	3–6, 4–6
Loss	6.	21 June 2015	ITF Ystad, Sweden	Clay	(Sweden) Rebecca Peterson	2–6, 1–6
Win	13.	28 June 2015	ITF Périgueux, France	Clay	(France) Chloé Paquet	6–4, 6−2
Win	14.	8 November 2015	Open Nantes, France	Hard (i)	(Romania) Andreea Mitu	6–3, 6−4

=== Doubles: 3 (1–2) ===
Legend $100,000 tournaments $75,000 tournaments $50,000 tournaments $25,000 tournaments $10,000 tournaments	Finals by surface Hard (1–1) Clay (0–1) Grass (0–0) Carpet (0–0)

Result	No.	Date	Tournament	Surface	Partner	Opponents	Score
Win	1.	21 June 2004	ITF Orestiada, Greece	Hard	(France) Aurélie Védy	(Argentina) Belen Karbalai (Argentina) Luciana Sarmento	6–0, 6–0
Loss	1.	4 July 2009	ITF Cuneo, Italy	Clay	(Czech Republic) Petra Cetkovská	(Uzbekistan) Akgul Amanmuradova (Belarus) Darya Kustova	7–5, 1–6, [7–10]
Loss	2.	4 April 2015	ITF Croissy-Beaubourg, France	Hard (i)	(France) Julie Coin	(United Kingdom) Jocelyn Rae (United Kingdom) Anna Smith	6–7^{(5)}, 6–7^{(2)}

== Grand Slam performance timelines ==
Key
W	F	SF	QF	#R	RR	Q#	DNQ	A	NH

(W) winner; (F) finalist; (SF) semifinalist; (QF) quarterfinalist; (#R) rounds 4, 3, 2, 1; (RR) round-robin stage; (Q#) qualification round; (DNQ) did not qualify; (A) absent; (NH) not held; (SR) strike rate (events won / competed); (W–L) win–loss record.

=== Singles ===
Tournament	2003	2004	2005	2006	2007	2008	2009	2010	2011	2012	2013	2014	2015	2016	W–L
Australian Open	A	A	A	Q2	Q1	1R	2R	Q1	1R	1R	1R	Q2	Q1	Q1	1–5
French Open	Q1	A	1R	2R	2R	2R	1R	1R	1R	3R	2R	1R	1R	Q2	6–11
Wimbledon	A	A	A	Q1	Q3	1R	2R	A	2R	2R	2R	Q2	A	A	4-5
US Open	A	A	Q1	Q2	1R	Q3	1R	Q1	1R	1R	1R	A	Q1	A	0–5
Win–loss	0–0	0–0	0–1	1–1	1–2	1–3	2–4	0–1	1–4	3-4	2–4	0–1	0–1	0–0	11–26

=== Doubles ===
Tournament	2003	2004	2005	2006	2007	2008	2009	2010	2011	2012	2013	2014	2015	2016	W–L
Australian Open							1R			1R	2R				1–3
French Open	1R		1R	1R	2R	2R	2R	1R	1R	1R	2R	1R	1R	2R	5–13
Wimbledon									1R						0–1
US Open									1R	1R					0–2
Win–loss	0–1	0–0	0–1	0–1	1–1	1–1	1–2	0–1	0–3	0–3	2–2	0–1	0–1	1–1	6–19
