= 2011 Copa Sony Ericsson Colsanitas =

- Date: 14–20 February
- Edition: 14th
- Category: WTA International
- Draw: 32S / 16D
- Prize money: $220,000
- Surface: Clay / outdoor
- Venue: Club Campestre El Rancho

Champions

Singles
- (Spain) Lourdes Domínguez Lino

Doubles
- (Romania) Edina Gallovits-Hall / (Spain) Anabel Medina Garrigues
- Copa Colsanitas

The 2011 Copa Sony Ericsson Colsanitas was a women's tennis tournament played on outdoor clay courts. It was the 14th edition of the Copa Sony Ericsson Colsanitas, and was on the International category of the 2011 WTA Tour. It took place at the Club Campestre El Rancho in Bogotá, Colombia, from 14 to 20 February.

== Finals ==
=== Singles ===
(Spain) Lourdes Domínguez Lino defeated (France) Mathilde Johansson, 2–6, 6–3, 6–2

- It was Lino's 1st title of the year and 2nd of her career. It was her 2nd win at the event, also winning in 2006.

=== Doubles ===
(Romania) Edina Gallovits-Hall / (Spain) Anabel Medina Garrigues defeated (Canada) Sharon Fichman / (Spain) Laura Pous Tió, 2–6, 7–6^{(8–6)}, [11–9]

== WTA entrants ==
=== Seeds ===
Country	Player	Ranking^{1}	Seeding
GER	Julia Görges	34	1
SLO	Polona Hercog	47	2
ROU	Simona Halep	63	3
ESP	Arantxa Parra Santonja	65	4
ESP	Carla Suárez Navarro	66	5
ROU	Edina Gallovits-Hall	76	6
ESP	Lourdes Domínguez Lino	77	7
ESP	Anabel Medina Garrigues	81	8

- ^{1} Rankings are as of February 7, 2011.

=== Other entrants ===
The following players received wildcards into the main draw:

- (Colombia) Catalina Castaño
- (Spain) Leticia Costas Moreira
- (Spain) Sílvia Soler Espinosa

The following players received entry from the qualifying draw:

- (Peru) Bianca Botto
- (Italy) Corinna Dentoni
- (Canada) Sharon Fichman
- (Spain) Beatriz García Vidagany
