= Edina Gallovits-Hall =

Romanian-born American tennis player

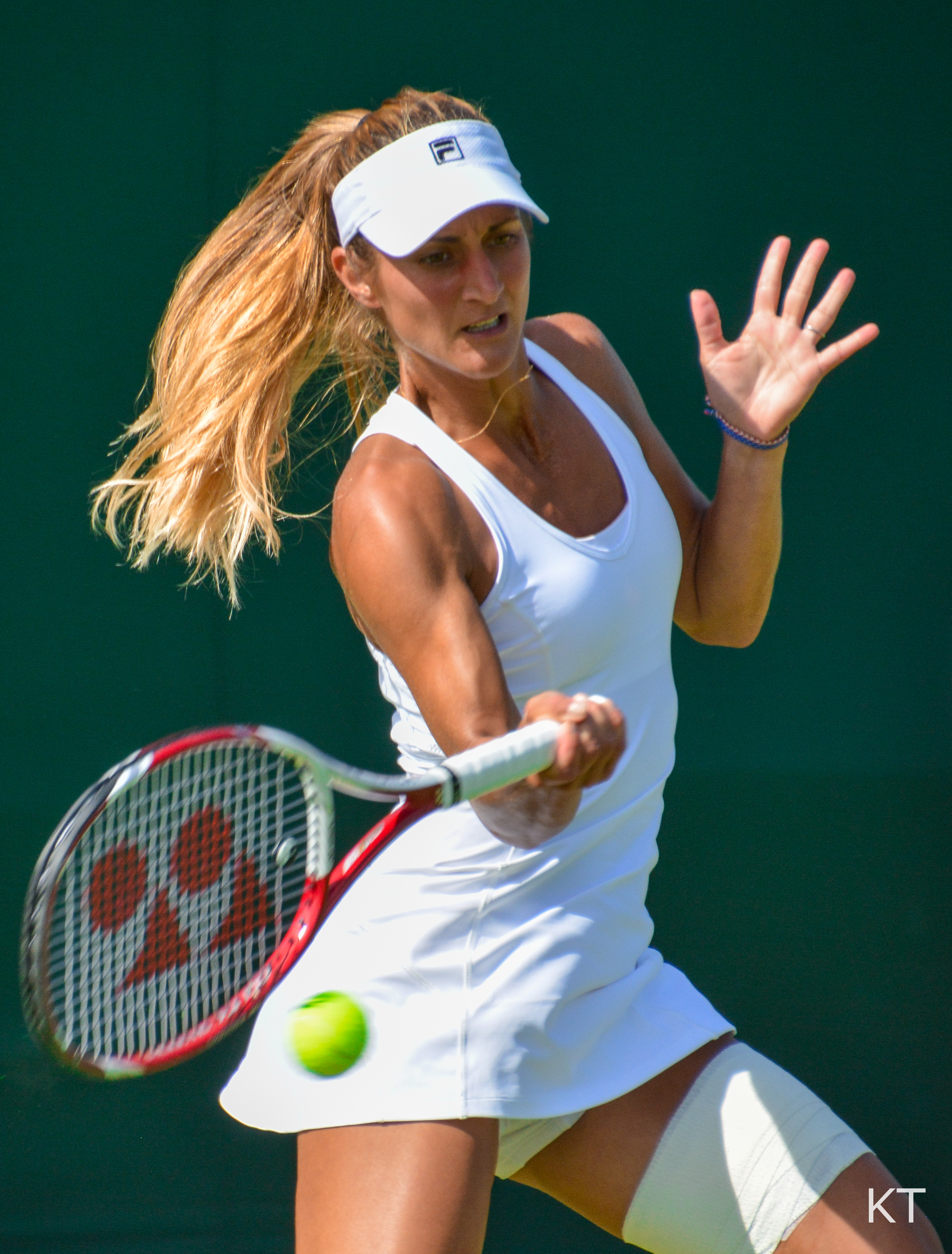
- Gallovits-Hall at the 2015 Wimbledon Championships
- Full name: Klaudia Edina Gallovits-Hall
- Country (sports): Romania (1999–2014); United States (2015)
- Residence: Atlanta, Georgia, U.S.
- Born: December 10, 1984 (age 41) Timișoara, Romania
- Height: 1.65 m (5 ft 5 in)
- Turned pro: 1999
- Plays: Right (two-handed backhand)
- Prize money: $1,294,978

Singles
- Career record: 419–262
- Career titles: 19 ITF
- Highest ranking: No. 54 (28 April 2008)

Grand Slam singles results
- Australian Open: 2R (2008, 2009)
- French Open: 2R (2007, 2011)
- Wimbledon: 2R (2008, 2010)
- US Open: 2R (2012)

Doubles
- Career record: 159–133
- Career titles: 3 WTA, 9 ITF
- Highest ranking: No. 63 (6 April 2009)

Grand Slam doubles results
- Australian Open: 2R (2009)
- French Open: 3R (2012)
- Wimbledon: 1R (2005, 2008, 2009, 2010)
- US Open: 2R (2009, 2010)

Klaudia Edina Gallovits-Hall (née Gallovits; born December 10, 1984) is a Romanian-born American former tennis player. On 28 April 2008, she achieved a career-high ranking of No. 54. She represented Romania until April 2015, then started playing for the United States.

Playing for the Romania Fed Cup team, she accumulated a win-loss record of 4–8.

== Personal life ==
She married American Andrew Hall in November 2010. Her father was in the 1980 Olympics representing Romania in the Modern Pentathlon. Her sister played tennis at Florida State University. Her mother was also a world class goalie for the Romanian handball team

== Career ==
In June 2007, she reached the final of the inaugural Barcelona KIA event.

In February 2010, she won her first WTA Tour title in doubles, at the Copa Colsanitas in Bogotá. Her second doubles title came in September 2010 at the Guangzhou International Women's Open.

In 2011, she defended her Bogotá title, winning the Copa Colsanitas alongside Anabel Medina Garrigues.

At the 2015 US Open, she played her last match on the professional tour. She was beaten in the first round of qualifying by Mayo Hibi, in three sets.

== Grand Slam performance timelines ==
Key
| W | F | SF | QF | #R | RR | Q# | DNQ | A | NH |

(W) winner; (F) finalist; (SF) semifinalist; (QF) quarterfinalist; (#R) rounds 4, 3, 2, 1; (RR) round-robin stage; (Q#) qualification round; (DNQ) did not qualify; (A) absent; (NH) not held; (SR) strike rate (events won / competed); (W–L) win–loss record.
To avoid confusion and double counting, these charts are updated at the conclusion of a tournament or when the player's participation has ended.

Only main-draw results in WTA Tour, Grand Slam tournaments, Fed Cup and Olympic Games are included in win–loss records.

Note: Gallovits-Hall played under Romanian flag until 2015.

=== Singles ===
| Tournament | 2001 | 2002 | 2003 | 2004 | 2005 | 2006 | 2007 | 2008 | 2009 | 2010 | 2011 | 2012 | 2013 | 2015 | SR | W–L | Win% |
|---|---|---|---|---|---|---|---|---|---|---|---|---|---|---|---|---|---|
Grand Slam tournaments
| Australian Open | A | A | A | A | Q2 | Q1 | 1R | 2R | 2R | 1R | 1R | A | 1R | A | 0 / 6 | 2–6 | 25% |
| French Open | A | A | 1R | Q3 | Q2 | Q3 | 2R | 1R | 1R | Q2 | 2R | 1R | A | A | 0 / 6 | 2–6 | 25% |
| Wimbledon | A | A | A | 1R | Q2 | Q2 | 1R | 2R | 1R | 2R | Q2 | 1R | A | 1R | 0 / 7 | 2–7 | 22% |
| US Open | A | A | Q1 | Q1 | Q3 | Q1 | 1R | 1R | 1R | 1R | Q3 | 2R | A | Q1 | 0 / 5 | 1–5 | 17% |
| Win–loss | 0–0 | 0–0 | 0–1 | 0–1 | 0–0 | 0–0 | 1–4 | 2–4 | 1–4 | 1–3 | 1–2 | 1–3 | 0–1 | 0–1 | 0 / 24 | 7–24 | 23% |
Premier Mandatory & Premier 5 + former
| Indian Wells Open | A | A | A | A | A | Q1 | Q1 | 2R | 2R | 1R | 1R | Q2 | A | Q1 | 0 / 4 | 2–4 | 33% |
| Miami Open | A | A | A | A | A | A | Q2 | 2R | 1R | Q1 | 1R | Q1 | A | Q1 | 0 / 3 | 1–3 | 25% |
| Cincinnati Open | NMS | | | | | | | | A | Q1 | A | A | A | A | 0 / 0 | 0–0 | – |
| Charleston Open (former) | A | A | A | A | A | A | A | 2R | NMS | | | | | | 0 / 1 | 1–1 | 50% |
| Win–loss | 0–0 | 0–0 | 0–0 | 0–0 | 0–0 | 0–0 | 0–0 | 3–3 | 1–2 | 0–1 | 0–2 | 0–0 | 0–0 | 0–0 | 0 / 8 | 4–8 | 33% |
Career statistics
| Tournaments | 0 (Note: During the season, she did not play in the main-draw of any WTA Tour-level tournaments. However, she played at the Fed Cup that is not counted as a played tournament but matches counted.) | 1 | 1 | 3 | 4 | 0 | 12 | 14 | 15 | 9 | 9 | 8 | 2 | 2 | Career total: 80 | | |
| Titles | 0 | 0 | 0 | 0 | 0 | 0 | 0 | 0 | 0 | 0 | 0 | 0 | 0 | 0 | Career total: 0 | | |
| Finals | 0 | 0 | 0 | 0 | 0 | 0 | 1 | 0 | 0 | 0 | 0 | 0 | 0 | 0 | Career total: 1 | | |
| Overall win-loss | 3–0 | 1–1 | 0–4 | 0–3 | 0–4 | 0–0 | 9–12 | 13–14 | 10–15 | 9–9 | 2–9 | 6–8 | 0–2 | 0–2 | 0 / 80 | 53–83 | 39% |
| Year-end ranking | 291 | 204 | 187 | 186 | 129 | 111 | 87 | 84 | 93 | 75 | 124 | 109 | 744 | 542 | $1,294,978 | | |

=== Doubles ===
| Tournament | 2001 | 2002 | 2003 | 2004 | 2005 | 2006 | 2007 | 2008 | 2009 | 2010 | 2011 | 2012 | 2013 | SR | W–L | Win |
|---|---|---|---|---|---|---|---|---|---|---|---|---|---|---|---|---|
Grand Slam tournaments
| Australian Open | A | A | A | A | A | A | A | 1R | 2R | 1R | 1R | A | A | 0 / 4 | 1–4 | 20% |
| French Open | A | A | A | A | A | A | A | 2R | 1R | 2R | 1R | 3R | A | 0 / 5 | 4–5 | 44% |
| Wimbledon | A | A | A | A | 1R | A | Q1 | 1R | 1R | 1R | A | A | A | 0 / 4 | 0–4 | 0% |
| US Open | A | A | A | A | A | A | 1R | A | 2R | 2R | 1R | A | A | 0 / 4 | 2–4 | 33% |
| Win–loss | 0–0 | 0–0 | 0–0 | 0–0 | 0–1 | 0–0 | 0–1 | 1–3 | 2–4 | 2–4 | 0–3 | 2–1 | 0–0 | 0 / 17 | 7–17 | 29% |
Premier Mandatory & Premier 5 + former
| Miami Open | A | A | A | A | A | A | A | 1R | A | A | A | A | A | 0 / 1 | 0–1 | 0% |
| Cincinnati Open | NMS | | | | | | | | A | 1R | A | A | A | 0 / 1 | 0–1 | 0% |
| Charleston Open (former) | A | A | A | A | A | A | F | A | NMS | | | | | 0 / 1 | 4–1 | 80% |
| Win–loss | 0–0 | 0–0 | 0–0 | 0–0 | 0–0 | 0–0 | 4–1 | 0–1 | 0–0 | 0–1 | 0–0 | 0–0 | 0–0 | 0 / 3 | 4–3 | 57% |
Career statistics
| Tournaments | 1 | 0 | 0 | 1 | 4 | 0 | 6 | 9 | 14 | 11 | 6 | 5 | 1 | Career total: 58 | | |
| Titles | 0 | 0 | 0 | 0 | 0 | 0 | 0 | 0 | 0 | 2 | 1 | 0 | 0 | Career total: 3 | | |
| Finals | 0 | 0 | 0 | 0 | 0 | 0 | 0 | 1 | 0 | 2 | 1 | 0 | 0 | Career total: 4 | | |
| Overall win-loss | 0–4 | 0–0 | 1–2 | 1–1 | 1–4 | 0–0 | 3–6 | 6–9 | 10–14 | 11–9 | 6–5 | 5–5 | 0–1 | 3 / 58 | 44–60 | 42% |
| Year-end ranking | 351 | 254 | 246 | 208 | 285 | 151 | 176 | 97 | 77 | 73 | 125 | 126 | n/a | | | |

== Significant finals ==
=== Premier Mandatory & Premier 5 tournaments ===
==== Doubles: 1 (runner-up) ====
| Result | Year | Tournament | Surface | Partner | Opponents | Score |
|---|---|---|---|---|---|---|
| Loss | 2008 | Charleston Open | Clay | (Belarus) Olga Govortsova | (Slovenia) Katarina Srebotnik (Japan) Ai Sugiyama | 2–6, 2–6 |

== WTA Tour finals ==
=== Singles: 1 (runner-up) ===
Legend
Premier
International (0–1)

| Result | W–L | Date | Tournament | Tier | Surface | Opponent | Score |
|---|---|---|---|---|---|---|---|
| Loss | 0–1 | Jun 2007 | Barcelona Open, Spain | Tier IV (Note: In 2009, the WTA Tier II tournaments were reclassified as WTA Premier tournaments, while the Tier III, Tier IV and Tier V were reclassified as International tournaments.) | Clay | (United States) Meghann Shaughnessy | 3–6, 2–6 |

=== Doubles: 4 (3 titles, 1 runner-up) ===
Legend
Premier M & Premier 5 (0–1)
Premier
International (3–0)

| Result | W–L | Date | Tournament | Tier | Surface | Partner | Opponents | Score |
|---|---|---|---|---|---|---|---|---|
| Loss | 0–1 | Apr 2008 | Charleston Open, United States | Tier I (Note: In 2009, the WTA Tier I tournaments were reclassified as Premier M & Premier 5.) | Clay | (Belarus) Olga Govortsova | (Slovenia) Katarina Srebotnik (Japan) Ai Sugiyama | 2–6, 2–6 |
| Win | 1–1 | Feb 2010 | Copa Colsanitas, Colombia | International | Clay | (Argentina) Gisela Dulko | (Ukraine) Olga Savchuk (Belarus) Anastasiya Yakimova | 6–2, 7–6^{(8–6)} |
| Win | 2–1 | Sep 2010 | Guangzhou Open, China | International | Hard | (India) Sania Mirza | (China) Han Xinyun (China) Liu Wanting | 7–5, 6–3 |
| Win | 3–1 | Feb 2011 | Copa Colsanitas, Colombia (2) | International | Clay | (Spain) Anabel Medina Garrigues | (Canada) Sharon Fichman (Spain) Laura Pous Tió | 2–6, 7–6^{(8–6)}, [11–9] |

== ITF finals ==
Legend
$100,000 tournaments
$75,000 tournaments
$50,000 tournaments
$25,000 tournaments
$10,000 tournaments

=== Singles: 28 (19 titles, 9 runner-ups) ===
| Result | W–L | Date | Tournament | Tier | Surface | Opponent | Score |
|---|---|---|---|---|---|---|---|
| Win | 1–0 | Aug 2000 | ITF Bucharest, Romania | 10,000 | Clay | (Romania) Raluca Ciochină | 6–3, 6–3 |
| Win | 2–0 | Apr 2001 | ITF Cavtat, Croatia | 10,000 | Clay | (Germany) Daniela Salomon | 6–0, 6–0 |
| Loss | 2–1 | Apr 2001 | ITF Taranto, Italy | 25,000 | Clay | (Greece) Eleni Daniilidou | 5–7, 2–6 |
| Win | 3–1 | Apr 2002 | ITF Hvar, Croatia | 10,000 | Clay | (Austria) Sandra Klemenschits | 6–2, 6–1 |
| Win | 4–1 | May 2002 | ITF Szeged, Hungary | 10,000 | Clay | (Switzerland) Daniela Casanova | 6–3, 6–0 |
| Win | 5–1 | Jun 2002 | Grado Tennis Cup, Italy | 25,000 | Clay | (Morocco) Bahia Mouhtassine | 6–3, 6–3 |
| Loss | 5–2 | Aug 2002 | Maribor Open, Slovenia | 25,000 | Clay | (Italy) Mara Santangelo | 2–6, 3–6 |
| Loss | 5–3 | Sep 2003 | ITF Raleigh, United States | 25,000 | Clay | (United States) Tiffany Dabek | 6–3, 5–7, 3–6 |
| Win | 6–3 | Oct 2003 | ITF Greenville, United States | 25,000 | Clay | (United States) Kristen Schlukebir | 6–0, 6–4 |
| Win | 7–3 | Apr 2005 | ITF Tunica Resorts, US | 25,000 | Clay (i) | (Uzbekistan) Varvara Lepchenko | 6–3, 4–6, 6–3 |
| Win | 8–3 | May 2005 | ITF Lafayette, United States | 50,000 | Clay | (Ukraine) Olga Lazarchuk | 6–2, 7–6^{(8–6)} |
| Win | 9–3 | May 2006 | ITF Indian Harbour Beach, US | 50,000 | Clay | (Paraguay) Rossana de los Ríos | 3–6, 7–6^{(7–5)}, 7–6^{(7–0)} |
| Loss | 9–4 | Jul 2006 | ITF Monteroni d'Arbia, Italy | 25,000 | Clay | (Italy) Karin Knapp | 2–6, 1–6 |
| Win | 10–4 | Oct 2006 | ITF Augusta, United States | 25,000 | Hard | (Russia) Ekaterina Afinogenova | 6–0, 6–2 |
| Loss | 10–5 | Jan 2007 | ITF Waikoloa, United States | 50,000 | Hard | (Hungary) Melinda Czink | 2–6, 3–6 |
| Win | 11–5 | Apr 2007 | ITF Pelham, United States | 25,000 | Clay | (Hungary) Gréta Arn | 6–3, 7–5 |
| Win | 12–5 | May 2007 | Charlottesville Open, US | 50,000 | Clay | (Germany) Angelika Bachmann | 6–3, 6–3 |
| Win | 13–5 | Nov 2008 | ITF Auburn, United States | 50,000 | Hard | (United States) Julie Ditty | 6–0, 6–7^{(7–9)}, 7–5 |
| Win | 14–5 | Nov 2008 | ITF San Diego, United States | 50,000 | Hard | (United States) Julie Ditty | 4–6, 6–3, 6–2 |
| Win | 15–5 | Apr 2010 | ITF Pelham, United States | 25,000 | Clay | (Croatia) Ajla Tomljanović | 6–2, 6–0 |
| Win | 16–5 | Apr 2010 | Dothan Pro Classic, US | 50,000 | Clay | (Belarus) Anastasiya Yakimova | 6–1, 6–4 |
| Win | 17–5 | May 2010 | ITF Indian Harbour Beach, US (2) | 50,000 | Clay | (United States) Shelby Rogers | 2–6, 6–3, 6–4 |
| Loss | 17–6 | Oct 2010 | ITF Kansas City, US | 50,000 | Hard | (Canada) Rebecca Marino | 7–6^{(7–4)}, 0–6, 2–6 |
| Win | 18–6 | Jun 2011 | Bella Cup, Poland | 50,000 | Clay | (France) Stéphanie Foretz | 6–4, 6–3 |
| Loss | 18–7 | Apr 2012 | ITF Pelham, United States | 25,000 | Clay | (Canada) Heidi El Tabakh | 6–3, 2–6, 4–6 |
| Loss | 18–8 | Apr 2012 | Dothan Pro Classic, US | 50,000 | Clay | (Italy) Camila Giorgi | 2–6, 6–4, 4–6 |
| Loss | 18–9 | Sep 2014 | ITF Amelia Island, US | 10,000 | Clay | (United States) Ingrid Neel | 4–4 ret. |
| Win | 19–9 | Nov 2014 | ITF Captiva Island, US | 50,000 | Hard | (Croatia) Petra Martić | 6–2, 6–2 |

=== Doubles: 22 (9 titles, 13 runner-ups) ===
| Result | W–L | Date | Tournament | Tier | Surface | Partner | Opponents | Score |
|---|---|---|---|---|---|---|---|---|
| Win | 1–0 | Aug 2000 | ITF Bucharest, Romania | 10,000 | Clay | (Romania) Liana Ungur | (Slovakia) Zuzana Kučová (Czech Republic) Dominika Luzarová | 7–5, 4–0 ret. |
| Loss | 1–1 | Sep 2000 | ITF Makarska, Croatia | 10,000 | Clay | (Romania) Ramona But | (Netherlands) Natasha Galouza (Czech Republic) Zuzana Hejdová | 5–7, 3–6 |
| Loss | 1–2 | Jul 2001 | ITF Civitanova, Italy | 25,000 | Clay | (Argentina) Gisela Dulko | (Italy) Gloria Pizzichini (Italy) Antonella Serra Zanetti | 3–6, 6–3, 1–6 |
| Loss | 1–3 | Apr 2002 | ITF Maglie, Italy | 25,000 | Carpet (i) | (Romania) Magda Mihalache | (China) Yan Zi (China) Zheng Jie | 4–6, 1–6 |
| Win | 2–3 | Jun 2002 | ITF Galatina, Italy | 25,000 | Clay | (Romania) Andreea Ehritt-Vanc | (Morocco) Bahia Mouhtassine (Austria) Sylvia Plischke | 6–3, 6–2 |
| Win | 3–3 | Sep 2002 | ITF Lecce, Italy | 25,000 | Clay | (Romania) Andreea Ehritt-Vanc | (Spain) Rosa María Andrés Rodríguez (Italy) Elisa Balsamo | 6–7^{(5–7)}, 6–3, 6–3 |
| Win | 4–3 | May 2003 | ITF Maglie, Italy | 25,000 | Clay | (Romania) Delia Sescioreanu | (Spain) Nuria Llagostera Vives (Spain) María José Martínez Sánchez | 6–4, 4–6, 6–3 |
| Loss | 4–4 | Sep 2003 | ITF Raleigh, United States | 25,000 | Clay | (Canada) Maureen Drake | (Brazil) Maria Fernanda Alves (United States) Tiffany Dabek | 6–2, 3–6, 1–6 |
| Win | 5–4 | Jul 2004 | International Country Cuneo, Italy | 50,000 | Clay | (Hungary) Zsófia Gubacsi | (Italy) Eva Hrdinová (Czech Republic) Sandra Záhlavová | 7–5, 6–3 |
| Win | 6–4 | Aug 2004 | ITF Louisville, US | 50,000 | Hard | (United States) Julie Ditty | (Republic of Ireland) Claire Curran (South Africa) Natalie Grandin | 1–6, 6–4, 6–2 |
| Loss | 6–5 | Apr 2005 | ITF Tunica Resorts, US | 25,000 | Clay (i) | (Uzbekistan) Varvara Lepchenko | (Belarus) Tatiana Poutchek (Russia) Anastasia Rodionova | 2–6, 4–6 |
| Loss | 6–6 | Apr 2006 | Dothan Pro Classic, US | 75,000 | Clay | (Uzbekistan) Varvara Lepchenko | (Australia) Monique Adamczak (Argentina) Soledad Esperón | 4–6, 6–3, 4–6 |
| Win | 7–6 | May 2006 | ITF Indian Harbour Beach, US | 50,000 | Hard | (United States) Jessica Kirkland | (Brazil) Maria Fernanda Alves (Canada) Marie-Ève Pelletier | 6–3, 6–2 |
| Loss | 7–7 | Jul 2006 | Bella Cup, Poland | 25,000 | Clay | (Slovakia) Lenka Tvarošková | (Slovenia) Andreja Klepač (Belarus) Ekaterina Dzehalevich | 6–7^{(5–7)}, 4–6 |
| Loss | 7–8 | Jul 2006 | ITF Martina Franca, Italy | 50,000 | Clay | (Bosnia and Herzegovina) Mervana Jugić-Salkić | (Italy) Ivana Abramović (France) Aurélie Védy | 3–6, 2–6 |
| Loss | 7–9 | Oct 2006 | ITF Barcelona, Spain | 75,000 | Clay | (Germany) Vanessa Henke | (Poland) Klaudia Jans-Ignacik (Poland) Alicja Rosolska | 1–6, 2–6 |
| Win | 8–9 | Feb 2007 | ITF Palm Desert, US | 25,000 | Hard | (United States) Julie Ditty | (South Africa) Natalie Grandin (United States) Raquel Kops-Jones | 6–2, 6–1 |
| Loss | 8–10 | Jun 2007 | Přerov Cup, Czech Republic | 75,000 | Clay | (Paraguay) Rossana de los Ríos | (Czech Republic) Lucie Hradecká (Czech Republic) Renata Voráčová | 7–5, 3–6, 2–6 |
| Loss | 8–11 | Oct 2009 | Tennis Classic of Troy, US | 50,000 | Hard | (Argentina) Jorgelina Cravero | (Slovenia) Petra Rampre (Austria) Nicole Rottmann | 3–6, 6–3, [8–10] |
| Win | 9–11 | Feb 2010 | Copa Bionaire, Colombia | 75,000 | Clay | (Slovenia) Polona Hercog | (Spain) Estrella Cabeza Candela (Spain) Laura Pous Tió | 3–6, 6–3, [10–8] |
| Loss | 9–12 | Jun 2011 | Bella Cup, Poland | 50,000 | Clay | (Slovenia) Andreja Klepač | (France) Stéphanie Foretz (Germany) Tatjana Malek | 2–6, 5–7 |
| Loss | 9–13 | Sep 2012 | Las Vegas Open, US | 50,000 | Hard | (Russia) Elena Bovina | (Australia) Anastasia Rodionova (Australia) Arina Rodionova | 2–6, 6–2, [6–10] |
