= Irina-Camelia Begu career statistics =

Career finals
Discipline	Type	Won	Lost	Total	WR
Singles	Grand Slam	–	–	–	–
Singles	WTA Finals	–	–	–	–
Singles	WTA 1000	–	–	–	–
Singles	WTA 500 and 250	6	4	10	0.60
Singles	Olympics	–	–	–	–
Singles	Total	6	4	10	0.60
Doubles	Grand Slam	–	–	–	–
Doubles	WTA Finals	–	–	–	–
Doubles	WTA 1000	0	1	0	0.00
Doubles	WTA 500 and 250	9	6	15	0.60
Doubles	Olympics	–	–	–	–
Doubles	Total	9	7	16	0.57

This is a list of the main career statistics of professional Romanian tennis player Irina-Camelia Begu.

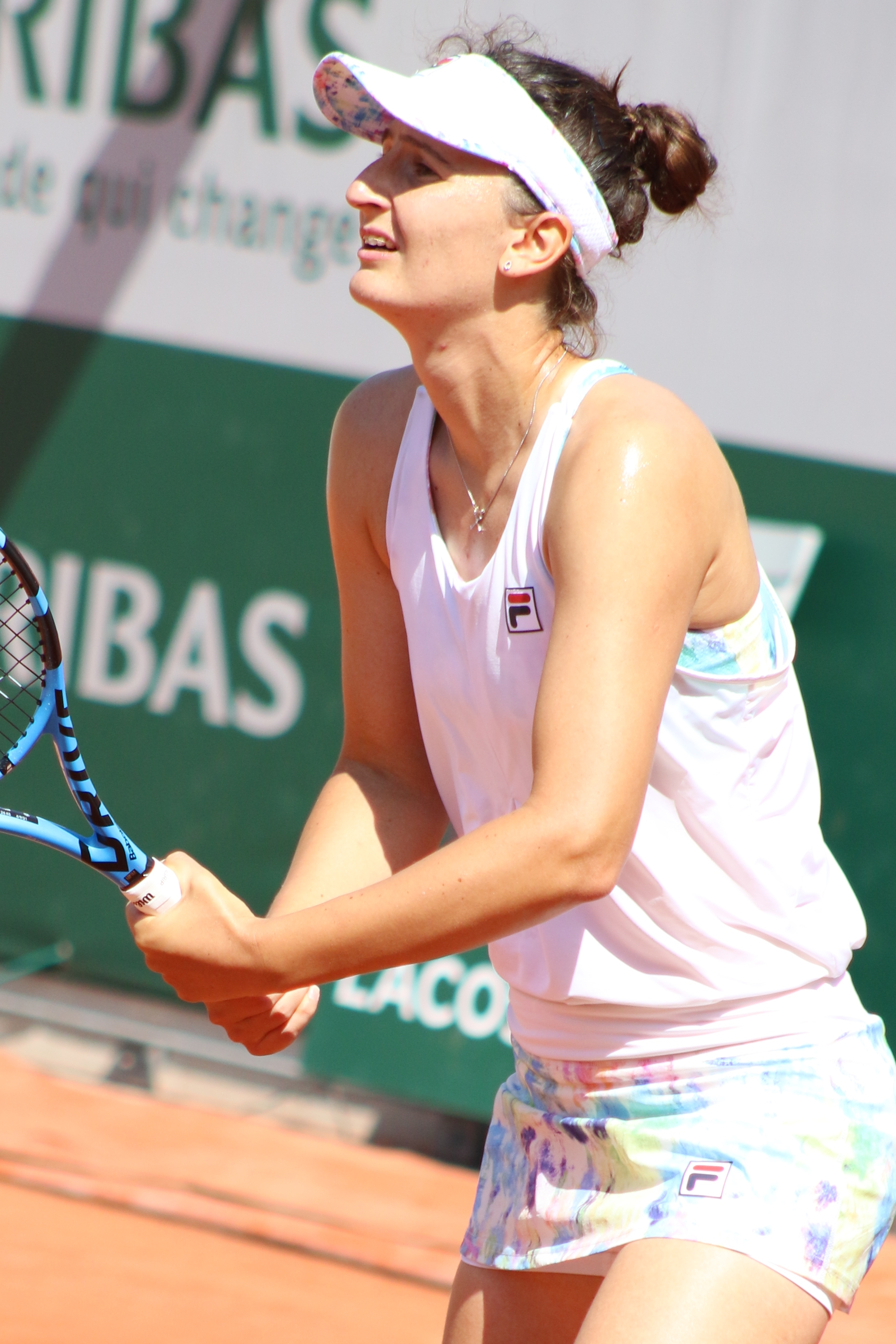
Begu at the 2021 French Open

== Performance timelines ==
Key
W	F	SF	QF	#R	RR	Q#	P#	DNQ	A	Z#	PO	G	S	B	NMS	NTI	P	NH

(W) winner; (F) finalist; (SF) semifinalist; (QF) quarterfinalist; (#R) rounds 4, 3, 2, 1; (RR) round-robin stage; (Q#) qualification round; (P#) preliminary round; (DNQ) did not qualify; (A) absent; (Z#) Davis/Fed Cup Zonal Group (with number indication) or (PO) play-off; (G) gold, (S) silver or (B) bronze Olympic/Paralympic medal; (NMS) not a Masters tournament; (NTI) not a Tier I tournament; (P) postponed; (NH) not held; (SR) strike rate (events won / competed); (W–L) win–loss record.
To avoid confusion and double counting, these charts are updated at the conclusion of a tournament or when the player's participation has ended.

Only main-draw results in WTA Tour, Grand Slam tournaments, Fed Cup/Billie Jean King Cup, Hopman Cup, United Cup and Olympic Games are included in win–loss records.

=== Singles ===
Current through the 2026 Madrid Open.

Tournament	2009	2010	2011	2012	2013	2014	2015	2016	2017	2018	2019	2020	2021	2022	2023	2024	2025	2026	SR	W–L	Win %
Grand Slam tournaments
Australian Open	A	A	Q3	1R	2R	1R	4R	1R	2R	2R	2R	1R	1R	2R	2R	A	1R	A	0 / 13	9–13	41%
French Open	Q3	A	2R	2R	1R	Q3	3R	4R	1R	3R	3R	2R	1R	4R	3R	3R	1R	Q2	0 / 14	19–14	58%
Wimbledon	Q2	Q1	1R	1R	1R	2R	3R	1R	2R	1R	Q2	NH	3R	3R	2R	1R	2R		0 / 13	10–13	43%
US Open	Q1	A	1R	2R	1R	2R	1R	1R	1R	2R	Q2	1R	1R	2R	1R	A	A		0 / 12	4–12	25%
Win–loss	0–0	0–0	1–3	2–4	1–4	2–3	7–4	3–4	2–4	4–4	3–2	1–3	2–4	7–4	4–4	2–2	1–3	0–0	0 / 52	42–52	45%
National representation
Summer Olympics	NH			1R	NH			1R	NH				A	NH		1R	NH		0 / 3	0–3	0%
Billie Jean King Cup (Note: Formerly known as Fed Cup until 2020.)	A	Z1	A	Z1	A	PO2	PO	RR	WG2	PO	SF	A (Note: Edition is split into the two years due to COVID-19.)		QR	A	A	A		0 / 2	8–8	50%
WTA 1000
Qatar Open (Note: The first Premier 5 event of the year has switched back and forth between the Dubai Tennis Championships and the Qatar Ladies Open since 2009. Dubai was classified as a Premier 5 event from 2009 to 2011 before being succeeded by Doha for the 2012–2014 period. In 2015, Dubai regained its Premier 5 status while Doha was demoted to Premier status. The Premier 5 tournaments were reclassified as WTA 1000 tournaments in 2021.)	NMS			A	A	A	NMS	A	NMS	1R	NMS	A	NMS	1R	NMS	A	A	A	0 / 5	0–5	0%
Dubai	A	A	A	NMS			A	NMS	1R	NMS	A	NMS	1R	NMS	1R	A	1R	A	0 / 6	0–6	0%
Indian Wells Open	A	A	A	2R	2R	A	A	1R	3R	2R	1R	NH	3R	1R	1R	A	2R	A	0 / 10	7–10	41%
Miami Open	A	A	A	1R	2R	A	3R	4R	2R	1R	1R	NH	1R	3R	2R	A	Q2	A	0 / 10	8–10	44%
Madrid Open	A	A	A	1R	A	2R	QF	QF	3R	2R	1R	NH	1R	1R	QF	2R	1R	1R	0 / 13	13–13	50%
Italian Open	A	A	A	A	A	A	3R	SF	1R	2R	1R	2R	Q1	A	2R	4R	1R	Q1	0 / 9	11–9	55%
Canadian Open	A	A	A	A	Q2	A	1R	A	1R	1R	A	NH	A	A	A	A	A		0 / 3	0–3	0%
Cincinnati Open	A	A	A	Q2	Q1	1R	2R	1R	Q1	1R	A	A	Q1	Q1	1R	A	A		0 / 5	1–5	17%
Guadalajara Open	NH													A	A	NMS			0 / 0	0–0	–
Pan Pacific / Wuhan Open (Note: In 2014, the Pan Pacific Open was downgraded to a Premier event and replaced by the Wuhan Open. The Premier 5 tournaments were reclassified as WTA 1000 tournaments in 2021.)	A	A	2R	A	A	A	2R	2R	A	A	A	NH				1R	A		0 / 4	3–4	43%
China Open	A	A	1R	A	A	A	1R	1R	A	A	A	NH			A	2R	A		0 / 4	1–4	20%
Win–loss	0–0	0–0	1–2	1–3	2–2	1–2	7–7	11–7	3–6	3–7	0–4	1–1	2–4	2–4	4–6	5–4	1–4	0–1	0 / 64	44–64	41%
Career statistics
	2009	2010	2011	2012	2013	2014	2015	2016	2017	2018	2019	2020	2021	2022	2023	2024	2025	2026	SR	W–L	Win %
Tournaments	1	1	11	20	17	15	21	21	23	25	15	8	15	16	13	8	9	1	Career total: 240		
Titles	0	0	0	1	0	0	1	1	1	0	0	0	0	1	0	0	1	0	Career total: 6		
Finals	0	0	2	1	0	1	1	1	1	0	0	0	1	1	0	0	1	0	Career total: 10		
Hard win–loss	0–0	1–0	5–5	12–9	6–10	7–8	16–13	11–12	6–15	12–16	6–9	0–4	14–10	10–10	5–8	1–2	1–4	0–0	3 / 132	113–135	46%
Clay win–loss	0–1	0–1	11–5	10–9	3–5	7–6	11–6	13–6	14–7	10–7	5–7	5–4	1–4	13–5	7–4	9–5	5–4	0–1	3 / 90	124–87	59%
Grass win–loss	0–0	0–0	0–1	1–3	1–2	1–1	2–3	1–3	1–1	0–2	0–0	NH	2–1	2–1	1–1	0–1	0–0	0–0	0 / 20	12–20	38%
Overall win–loss	0–1	1–1	16–11	23–21	10–17	15–15	29–22	25–21	21–23	22–25	11–16	5–8	17–15	25–16	13–13	10–8	7–9	0–1	6 / 249	250–243	51%
Win (%)	0%	50%	59%	52%	37%	50%	57%	54%	48%	47%	41%	38%	53%	61%	50%	56%	44%	0%	Career total: 51%		
Year-end ranking (Note: 2006: WTA ranking–974, 2007: WTA ranking–710, 2008: WTA ranking–231.)	230	214	40	52	124	42	31	29	43	66	99	76	60	34	76	83	147		$8,871,136		

=== Doubles ===
Current through the 2023 Australian Open.

Tournament	2009	2010	2011	2012	2013	2014	2015	2016	2017	2018	2019	2020	2021	2022	2023	SR	W–L	Win%
Grand Slam tournaments
Australian Open	A	A	A	QF	3R	1R	2R	1R	1R	SF	2R	1R	1R	1R	1R	0 / 12	11–12	48%
French Open	A	A	A	1R	2R	3R	2R	A	QF	2R	1R	1R	SF	2R	1R	0 / 11	13–11	54%
Wimbledon	A	A	1R	2R	1R	1R	2R	1R	A	QF	3R	NH	A	1R	2R	0 / 10	8–10	44%
US Open	A	A	2R	1R	1R	1R	3R	1R	1R	2R	A	A	2R	1R	1R	0 / 11	5–11	31%
Win–loss	0–0	0–0	1–2	4–4	3–4	2–4	5–4	0–3	3–3	9–4	3–3	0–2	5–3	1–4	1–4	0 / 44	37–44	46%
National representation
Summer Olympics	NH			A	NH			1R	NH				A	NH		0 / 1	0–1	0%
WTA 1000
Dubai / Qatar Open	A	A	A	A	A	A	A	A	2R	A	A	A	A	A		0 / 1	1–1	50%
Indian Wells Open	A	A	A	2R	2R	A	A	1R	A	1R	1R	NH	1R	QF		0 / 7	4–6	40%
Miami Open	A	A	A	1R	1R	A	A	A	A	2R	1R	NH	A	1R	QF	0 / 6	3–6	33%
Madrid Open	A	A	A	1R	A	1R	QF	1R	SF	1R	2R	NH	A	A		0 / 7	6–7	46%
Italian Open	A	A	A	A	A	A	2R	SF	A	1R	1R	A	SF	A		0 / 5	7–5	58%
Canadian Open	A	A	A	A	2R	A	QF	A	A	1R	A	NH	A	A		0 / 3	3–3	50%
Cincinnati Open	A	A	A	1R	1R	A	1R	A	QF	1R	A	A	A	2R	2R	0 / 7	4–7	36%
Guadalajara Open	NH													A	A	0 / 0	0–0	–
Pan Pacific / Wuhan Open	A	A	QF	A	A	A	F	A	A	A	A	NH				0 / 2	4–2	67%
China Open	A	A	A	A	A	A	1R	A	A	A	A	NH				0 / 1	0–1	0%
Career statistics
Tournaments	1	0	10	18	16	15	17	8	13	18	13	5	7	8	6	Career total: 155		
Titles	0	0	0	1	1	2	0	0	2	2	1	0	0	0	0	Career total: 9		
Finals	0	0	0	3	1	2	3	0	2	4	1	0	0	0	0	Career total: 16		
Overall win–loss	1–1	0–0	6–10	26–17	13–15	15–13	22–17	3–9	19–11	26–16	15–12	1–5	10–7	6–8	4–6	9 / 155	167–147	53%
Year-end ranking	188	157	62	37	69	56	30	170	38	23	73	123	63	134				

== Significant finals ==
=== Premier Mandatory/Premier 5 tournaments ===
==== Doubles: 1 (runner-up) ====
Result	Year	Tournament	Surface	Partner	Opponent	Score
Loss	2015	Wuhan Open	Hard	(Romania) Monica Niculescu	(Switzerland) Martina Hingis (India) Sania Mirza	2–6, 3–6

== WTA Tour finals ==
=== Singles: 10 (6 titles, 4 runner-ups) ===
Legend Grand Slam (0–0) WTA 1000 (0–0) WTA 500 (0–1) WTA 250 (6–3)	Finals by surface Hard (3–2) Grass (0–0) Clay (3–2) Carpet (0–0)

Result	W–L	Date	Tournament	Tier	Surface	Opponent	Score
Loss	0–1	Apr 2011	Andalucia Tennis Experience, Spain	International (Note: The WTA International tournaments were reclassified as WTA 250 tournaments in 2021.)	Clay	(Belarus) Victoria Azarenka	3–6, 2–6
Loss	0–2	Jul 2011	Budapest Grand Prix, Hungary	International	Clay	(Italy) Roberta Vinci	4–6, 6–1, 4–6
Win	1–2	Sep 2012	Tashkent Open, Uzbekistan	International	Hard	(Croatia) Donna Vekić	6–4, 6–4
Loss	1–3	Oct 2014	Kremlin Cup, Russia	Premier (Note: The WTA Premier tournaments were reclassified as WTA 500 tournaments in 2021.)	Hard (i)	(Russia) Anastasia Pavlyuchenkova	4–6, 7–5, 1–6
Win	2–3	Sep 2015	Korea Open, South Korea	International	Hard	(Belarus) Aliaksandra Sasnovich	6–3, 6–1
Win	3–3	Aug 2016	Brasil Tennis Cup, Brazil	International	Hard	(Hungary) Tímea Babos	2–6, 6–4, 6–3
Win	4–3	Jul 2017	Bucharest Open, Romania	International	Clay	(Germany) Julia Görges	6–3, 7–5
Loss	4–4	Aug 2021	Tennis in Cleveland, United States	WTA 250	Hard	(Estonia) Anett Kontaveit	6–7^{(5–7)}, 4–6
Win	5–4	Jul 2022	Palermo Ladies Open, Italy	WTA 250	Clay	(Italy) Lucia Bronzetti	6–2, 6–2
Win	6–4	Jul 2025	Iași Open, Romania	WTA 250	Clay	(Switzerland) Jil Teichmann	6–0, 7–5

=== Doubles: 16 (9 titles, 7 runner-ups) ===
Legend Grand Slam (0–0) WTA 1000 (0–1) WTA 500 (0–2) WTA 250 (9–4)	Finals by surface Hard (5–4) Grass (1–1) Clay (3–2) Carpet (0–0)

Result	W–L	Date	Tournament	Tier	Surface	Partner	Opponents	Score
Win	1–0	Jan 2012	Hobart International, Australia	International	Hard	(Romania) Monica Niculescu	(Chinese Taipei) Chuang Chia-jung (New Zealand) Marina Erakovic	6–7^{(4–7)}, 7–6^{(7–4)}, [10–5]
Loss	1–1	Apr 2012	Fez Grand Prix, Morocco	International	Clay	(Romania) Alexandra Cadanțu	(Czech Republic) Petra Cetkovská (Russia) Alexandra Panova	6–3, 6–7^{(5–7)}, [9–11]
Loss	1–2	Oct 2012	Luxembourg Open, Luxembourg	International	Hard (i)	(Romania) Monica Niculescu	(Czech Republic) Andrea Hlaváčková (Czech Republic) Lucie Hradecká	3–6, 4–6
Win	2–2	Jun 2013	Rosmalen Open, Netherlands	International	Grass	(Spain) Anabel Medina Garrigues	(Slovakia) Dominika Cibulková (Spain) Arantxa Parra Santonja	4–6, 7–6^{(7–3)}, [11–9]
Win	3–2	Feb 2014	Rio Open, Brazil	International	Clay	(Argentina) María Irigoyen	(Sweden) Johanna Larsson (South Africa) Chanelle Scheepers	6–2, 6–0
Win	4–2	Sep 2014	Korea Open, South Korea	International	Hard	(Spain) Lara Arruabarrena	(Germany) Mona Barthel (Luxembourg) Mandy Minella	6–3, 6–3
Loss	4–3	Feb 2015	Rio Open, Brazil	International	Clay	(Argentina) María Irigoyen	(Belgium) Ysaline Bonaventure (Sweden) Rebecca Peterson	0–3 ret.
Loss	4–4	Oct 2015	Wuhan Open, China	Premier 5 (Note: The WTA Premier 5 & Mandatory tournaments were reclassified as WTA 1000 tournaments in 2021.)	Hard	(Romania) Monica Niculescu	(Switzerland) Martina Hingis (India) Sania Mirza	2–6, 3–6
Loss	4–5	Oct 2015	Kremlin Cup, Russia	Premier	Hard (i)	(Romania) Monica Niculescu	(Russia) Daria Kasatkina (Russia) Elena Vesnina	3–6, 7–6^{(9–7)}, [5–10]
Win	5–5	Jul 2017	Bucharest Open, Romania	International	Clay	(Romania) Raluca Olaru	(Belgium) Elise Mertens (Netherlands) Demi Schuurs	6–3, 6–3
Win	6–5	Oct 2017	Tianjin Open, China	International	Hard	(Italy) Sara Errani	(Slovenia) Dalila Jakupović (Serbia) Nina Stojanović	6–4, 6–3
Win	7–5	Jan 2018	Shenzhen Open, China	International	Hard	(Romania) Simona Halep	(Czech Republic) Kateřina Siniaková (Czech Republic) Barbora Krejčíková	1–6, 6–1, [10–8]
Loss	7–6	Jun 2018	Eastbourne International, United Kingdom	Premier	Grass	(Romania) Mihaela Buzărnescu	(Canada) Gabriela Dabrowski (China) Xu Yifan	3–6, 5–7
Win	8–6	Jul 2018	Bucharest Open, Romania (2)	International	Clay	(Romania) Andreea Mitu	(Montenegro) Danka Kovinić (Belgium) Maryna Zanevska	6–3, 6–4
Loss	8–7	Sep 2018	Tashkent Open, Uzbekistan	International	Hard	(Romania) Raluca Olaru	(Serbia) Olga Danilović (Slovenia) Tamara Zidanšek	5–7, 3–6
Win	9–7	Feb 2019	Hua Hin Championships, Thailand	International	Hard	(Romania) Monica Niculescu	(Russia) Anna Blinkova (China) Wang Yafan	2–6, 6–1, [12–10]

== WTA Challenger finals ==
=== Singles: 6 (4 titles, 2 runner-ups) ===
Result	W–L	Date	Tournament	Surface	Opponent	Score
Win	1–0	Mar 2020	Indian Wells Challenger, United States	Hard	(Japan) Misaki Doi	6–3, 6–3
Win	2–0	Sep 2022	Open Romanian Ladies, Romania	Clay	(Hungary) Réka Luca Jani	6–3, 6–3
Loss	2–1	Jul 2023	Iași Open, Romania	Clay	(Romania) Ana Bogdan	2–6, 3–6
Loss	2–2	Mar 2024	Antalya Challenger, Turkey	Clay	(Spain) Jéssica Bouzas Maneiro	2–6, 6–4, 2–6
Win	3–2	Sep 2024	Montreux Ladies Open, Switzerland	Clay	(Croatia) Petra Marčinko	1–6, 6–3, 6–0
Win	4–2	Nov 2024	Cali Open, Colombia	Clay	(Slovenia) Veronika Erjavec	6–3, 6–3

== ITF Circuit finals ==
=== Singles: 20 (12 titles, 8 runner–ups) ===
Legend
$100,000 tournaments (4–3)
$50,000 tournaments (1–1)
$25,000 tournaments (4–2)
$10,000 tournaments (3–2)

Result	W–L	Date	Tournament	Tier	Surface	Opponent	Score
Loss	0–1	Sep 2006	ITF Bucharest, Romania	10,000	Clay	(Romania) Alexandra Cadanţu	3–6, 6–2, 3–6
Win	1–1	Sep 2007	ITF Brașov, Romania	10,000	Clay	(Romania) Cristina Mitu	7–6^{(7–2)}, 6–2
Loss	1–2	Mar 2008	ITF Ain Sukhna, Egypt	10,000	Carpet	(Poland) Katarzyna Piter	6–7^{(7–9)}, 4–6
Win	2–2	Sep 2008	ITF Brașov, Romania	10,000	Clay	(Romania) Diana Enache	4–6, 6–4, 6–1
Win	3–2	Sep 2008	ITF Budapest, Hungary	10,000	Clay	(Romania) Laura Ioana Andrei	7–5, 6–1
Win	4–2	Oct 2008	ITF Jounieh Open, Lebanon	50,000	Clay	(Belarus) Anastasiya Yakimova	6–2, 6–0
Win	5–2	Oct 2008	GB Pro-Series Glasgow, United Kingdom	25,000	Hard (i)	(Austria) Patricia Mayr	2–6, 7–5, 7–6^{(7–1)}
Loss	5–3	Apr 2010	ITF Incheon, South Korea	25,000	Hard	(South Korea) Lee Jin-a	4–6, 2–6
Loss	5–4	Aug 2010	Reinert Open, Germany	25,000	Clay	(Poland) Magda Linette	2–6, 5–7
Win	6–4	Sep 2010	Royal Cup, Montenegro	25,000	Clay	(Italy) Annalisa Bona	6–1, 6–1
Win	7–4	Feb 2011	Copa Cali, Colombia	100,000	Clay	(Spain) Laura Pous Tió	6–3, 7–6^{(7–1)}
Loss	7–5	Jun 2011	Open de Marseille, France	100,000	Clay	(France) Pauline Parmentier	3–6, 2–6
Win	8–5	Jul 2011	Open Romanian Ladies, Romania	100,000	Clay	(Spain) Laura Pous Tió	6–3, 7–5
Win	9–5	Mar 2014	ITF Campinas, Brazil	25,000	Clay	(Russia) Alexandra Panova	6–2, 6–4
Win	10–5	Mar 2014	ITF São Paulo, Brazil	25,000	Clay	(Russia) Alexandra Panova	7–5, 4–6, 6–4
Loss	10–6	Apr 2014	Open Medellín, Colombia	50,000	Clay	(Paraguay) Verónica Cepede Royg	4–6, 6–4, 4–6
Win	11–6	Jul 2014	Contrexéville Open, France	100,000	Clay	(Estonia) Kaia Kanepi	6–3, 6–4
Loss	11–7	Jun 2017	Southsea Trophy, United Kingdom	100,000+H	Grass	(Germany) Tatjana Maria	2–6, 2–6
Loss	11–8	Oct 2019	Kiskút Open, Hungary	100,000	Clay (i)	(Montenegro) Danka Kovinic	4–6, 6–3, 3–6
Win	12–8	Feb 2020	Cairo Open, Egypt	100,000	Hard	(Ukraine) Lesia Tsurenko	6–4, 3–6, 6–2

=== Doubles: 27 (19 titles, 8 runner–ups) ===
Legend
$100,000 tournaments (5–2)
$75,000 tournaments (1–1)
$50,000 tournaments (1–1)
$25,000 tournaments (5–1)
$10,000 tournaments (7–3)

Result	W–L	Date	Tournament	Tier	Surface	Partner	Opponents	Score
Win	1–0	Jun 2006	ITF Galaţi, Romania	10,000	Clay	(Romania) Carmen-Raluca Ţibuleac	(Romania) Bianca Bonifate (Romania) Diana Gae	6–2, 7–5
Win	2–0	May 2007	ITF Bucharest, Romania	10,000	Clay	(Romania) Simona Halep	(Romania) Laura Ioana Andrei (Romania) Ioana Gașpar	6–4, 6–2
Loss	2–1	Aug 2007	ITF Hunedoara, Romania	10,000	Clay	(Romania) Laura Ioana Andrei	(Romania) Diana Enache (Romania) Antonia Xenia Tout	6–3, 4–6, 4–6
Loss	2–2	Sep 2007	ITF Brașov, Romania	10,000	Clay	(Romania) Diana Gae	(Romania) Raluca Ciulei (Romania) Camelia Hristea	5–7, 4–6
Loss	2–3	Jun 2008	ITF Craiova, Romania	10,000	Clay	(Romania) Alexandra Damaschin	(Romania) Laura-Ioana Andrei (Romania) Diana Enache	3–6, 1–6
Win	3–3	Jul 2008	ITF Bucharest, Romania	10,000	Clay	(Romania) Ioana Gașpar	(Romania) Mihaela Bunea (Romania) Gabriela Niculescu	4–6, 6–3, [10–3]
Win	4–3	Jul 2008	ITF Hunedoara, Romania	10,000	Clay	(Romania) Elora Dabija	(Slovakia) Katarína Poljaková (Slovakia) Zuzana Zlochová	7–5, 6–2
Win	5–3	Aug 2008	ITF Bucharest, Romania	10,000	Clay	(Romania) Laura Ioana Andrei	(Ukraine) Lyudmyla Kichenok (Ukraine) Nadiia Kichenok	6–2, 3–6, [10–6]
Win	6–3	Sep 2008	ITF Brașov, Romania	10,000	Clay	(Romania) Laura Ioana Andrei	(Romania) Bianca Hîncu (Romania) Cristina Stancu	6–2, 6–2
Win	7–3	Sep 2008	ITF Budapest, Hungary	10,000	Clay	(Romania) Laura Ioana Andrei	(Belgium) Davinia Lobbinger (Israel) Efrat Mishor	6–2, 6–4
Loss	7–4	Oct 2008	GB Pro-Series Glasgow, United Kingdom	25,000	Hard	(Romania) Laura Ioana Andrei	(Switzerland) Stefania Boffa (United Kingdom) Amanda Elliott	4–6, 6–7^{(3)}
Win	8–4	May 2009	Open Romania Ladies, Romania	100,000	Clay	(Romania) Simona Halep	(Germany) Julia Görges (Austria) Sandra Klemenschits	2–6, 6–1, [12–10]
Win	9–4	Apr 2010	ITF Incheon, South Korea	25,000	Hard	(Japan) Erika Sema	(Japan) Misaki Doi (Japan) Junri Namigata	6–0, 7–6^{(8)}
Loss	9–5	Jul 2010	ITF Darmstadt, Germany	25,000	Clay	(Japan) Erika Sema	(Russia) Vitalia Diatchenko (Germany) Laura Siegemund	6–4, 1–6, [4–10]
Win	10–5	Jul 2010	Open Romania Ladies, Romania (2)	75,000	Clay	(Romania) Elena Bogdan	(Argentina) María Irigoyen (Argentina) Florencia Molinero	6–1, 6–1
Win	11–5	Aug 2010	Ladies Open Hechingen, Germany	25,000	Clay	(France) Anaïs Laurendon	(Germany) Julia Schruff (Japan) Erika Sema	6–2, 4–6, [10–8]
Win	12–5	Sep 2010	Royal Cup, Montenegro	25,000	Clay	(Romania) Mihaela Buzărnescu	(Russia) Valeriya Solovyeva (Ukraine) Maryna Zanevska	5–7, 7–5, [12–10]
Win	13–5	Sep 2010	ITF Bucharest, Romania	25,000	Clay	(Romania) Elena Bogdan	(Spain) Leticia Costas Moreira (Spain) Eva Fernández Brugués	6–1, 6–3
Loss	13–6	Oct 2010	ITF Madrid, Spain	50,000	Clay	(Romania) Elena Bogdan	(Spain) Lara Arruabarrena-Vecino (Spain) María-Teresa Torró-Flor	4–6, 5–7
Loss	13–7	Nov 2010	Toyota World Challenge, Japan	75,000	Carpet (i)	(Romania) Mădălina Gojnea	(Japan) Shuko Aoyama (Japan) Rika Fujiwara	6–1, 3–6, [9–11]
Win	14–7	Feb 2011	Copa Cali, Colombia	100,000	Clay	(Romania) Elena Bogdan	(Russia) Ekaterina Ivanova (Germany) Kathrin Wörle	2–6, 7–6^{(6)}, [11–9]
Win	15–7	Jun 2011	Open de Marseille, France	100,000	Clay	(Russia) Nina Bratchikova	(Romania) Laura Ioana Andrei (Romania) Mădălina Gojnea	6–2, 6–2
Win	16–7	Jul 2011	Open Romania Ladies (3)	100,000	Clay	(Romania) Elena Bogdan	(Italy) Maria Elena Camerin (Turkey) İpek Şenoğlu	6–7^{(1)}, 7–6^{(4)}, [16–14]
Win	17–7	Jul 2012	Open Romania Ladies (4)	100,000	Clay	(France) Alizé Cornet	(Romania) Elena Bogdan (Romania) Raluca Olaru	6–2, 6–0
Win	18–7	Mar 2014	ITF São Paulo, Brazil	25,000	Clay	(Russia) Alexandra Panova	(Argentina) María Irigoyen (Bolivia) María Fernanda Álvarez Terán	6–4, 3–6, [11–9]
Win	19–7	Apr 2014	Open Medellín, Colombia	50,000	Clay	(Argentina) María Irigoyen	(Australia) Monique Adamczak (Russia) Marina Shamayko	6–2, 7–6^{(2)}
Loss	19–8	Jul 2014	Contrexéville Open, France	100,000	Clay	(Argentina) María Irigoyen	(Russia) Alexandra Panova (France) Laura Thorpe	3–6, 0–4 ret.

== WTA Tour career earnings ==
Current through the 2022 US Open

Year	Grand Slam singles titles	WTA singles titles	Total singles titles	Earnings ($)	Money list rank
2011	0	0	0	238,281	81
2012	0	1	1	330,858	67
2013	0	0	0	281,193	91
2014	0	0	0	408,147	75
2015	0	1	1	956,716	31
2016	0	1	1	846,456	38
2017	0	1	1	685,538	45
2018	0	0	0	823,497	47
2019	0	0	0	481,728	92
2020	0	0	0	316,842	78
2021	0	0	0	613,646	55
2022	0	1	1	950,415	42
2023	0	0	0
Career	0	5	5	7,035,859	92

== Career Grand Slam statistics ==
=== Grand Slam seedings ===
The tournaments won by Begu are in boldface, and advanced into finals by Begu are in italics.

Year	Australian Open	French Open	Wimbledon	US Open
2009	did not play	did not qualify	did not qualify	did not qualify
2010	did not play	did not play	did not qualify	did not play
2011	did not qualify	not seeded	not seeded	not seeded
2012	not seeded	not seeded	not seeded	not seeded
2013	not seeded	not seeded	not seeded	not seeded
2014	qualifier	did not qualify	not seeded	not seeded
2015	not seeded	30th	29th	28th
2016	29th	25th	25th	21st
2017	27th	not seeded	not seeded	not seeded
2018	not seeded	not seeded	not seeded	not seeded
2019	not seeded	not seeded	did not qualify	did not qualify
2020	not seeded	not seeded	not held	not seeded
2021	not seeded	not seeded	not seeded	not seeded
2022	not seeded	not seeded	not seeded	not seeded

== Top 10 wins ==
Season	2012	...	2015	2016	2017	2018	...	2022	2023	Total
Wins	1		1	3	0	1		1	1	8

#	Player	Rk	Event	Surface	Rd	Score	Rk	Ref
2012
1.	(Denmark) Caroline Wozniacki	8	US Open, United States	Hard	1R	6–2, 6–2	96	
2015
2.	(Germany) Angelique Kerber	9	Australian Open, Australia	Hard	1R	6–4, 0–6, 6–1	42	
2016
3.	(Spain) Garbiñe Muguruza	4	Madrid Open, Spain	Clay	2R	5–7, 7–6^{(7–4)}, 6–3	34	
4.	(Belarus) Victoria Azarenka	6	Italian Open, Italy	Clay	2R	6–3, 6–2	35	
5.	(Switzerland) Belinda Bencic	8	Birmingham Classic, UK	Grass	1R	6–4, 4–3 ret.	26	
2018
6.	(Latvia) Jeļena Ostapenko	5	Madrid Open, Spain	Clay	1R	6–3, 6–3	38	
2022
7.	Aryna Sabalenka	5	Miami Open, United States	Hard	2R	6–4, 6–4	70	
2023
8.	Veronika Kudermetova	9	Adelaide International 1, Australia	Hard	QF	7–5, 6–4	34	

== Awards ==
2011

- WTA Newcomer of the Year
