= 2011 BCR Open Romania Ladies – Doubles =

Doubles
- 2011 BCR Open Romania Ladies

Final
- Champion: (Romania) Irina-Camelia Begu (Romania) Elena Bogdan
- Runner-up: (Italy) Maria Elena Camerin (Turkey) İpek Şenoğlu
- Score: 6–7^{(1–7)}, 7–6^{(7–4)}, [16–14]

Events
Singles	Doubles
← 2010 ·	BCR Open Romania Ladies	· 2012 →

Irina-Camelia Begu and Elena Bogdan were the defending champions, and successfully defended their title by defeating Maria Elena Camerin and İpek Şenoğlu in the final, 6–7^{(1–7)}, 7–6^{(7–4)}, [16–14]

== Seeds ==
1. (Slovenia) Andreja Klepač / (Czech Republic) Renata Voráčová (semifinals)
2. (Russia) Maria Kondratieva / (France) Sophie Lefèvre (semifinals)
3. (Romania) Irina-Camelia Begu / (Romania) Elena Bogdan (champions)
4. (Italy) Maria Elena Camerin / (Turkey) İpek Şenoğlu (final)

== Draw ==
=== Key ===
- Q = Qualifier
- WC = Wild card
- LL = Lucky loser
- Alt = Alternate
- SE = Special exempt
- PR = Protected ranking
- ITF = ITF entry
- JE = Junior exempt
- w/o = Walkover
- r = Retired
- d = Defaulted
- SR = Special ranking

First round
1	(Slovenia) A Klepač (Czech Republic) R Voráčová	6	6
(Italy) C Dentoni (Romania) L Ungur	2	3
(Romania) D Enache (Netherlands) D Harmsen	5	6	[5]
WC	(Spain) L Pous Tió (Romania) S Halep	7	2	[10]
3	(Romania) I-C Begu (Romania) E Bogdan	6	6
(Romania) M Gojnea (Croatia) D Jurak	3	0
(France) L Thorpe (Slovenia) M Zec Peškirič	6	6^{3}	[10]
(Ukraine) L Kichenok (Ukraine) N Kichenok	2	7^{7}	[6]
(Romania) I-R Olaru (Japan) E Sema	6	6
(Spain) E Fernández-Brugués (Bulgaria) E Kostova	1	2
(Austria) S Klemenschits (Switzerland) S Vögele	1	6^{5}
4	(Italy) ME Camerin (Turkey) İ Şenoğlu	6	7^{7}
WC	(Romania) A Cadanțu (Romania) E Dabija	6	6
WC	(Romania) L-I Andrei (Romania) C Mitu	4	3
(Czech Republic) Ka Plíšková (Czech Republic) Kr Plíšková	5	7	[4]
2	(Russia) M Kondratieva (France) S Lefèvre	7	5	[10]

Quarterfinals
1	(Slovenia) A Klepač (Czech Republic) R Voráčová	6	7
WC	(Spain) L Pous Tió (Romania) S Halep	1	5
3	(Romania) I-C Begu (Romania) E Bogdan	6	3	[10]
(France) L Thorpe (Slovenia) M Zec Peškirič	4	6	[8]
(Romania) I-R Olaru (Japan) E Sema	3	6	[4]
4	(Italy) ME Camerin (Turkey) İ Şenoğlu	6	3	[10]
WC	(Romania) A Cadanțu (Romania) E Dabija	6	3	[11]
2	(Russia) M Kondratieva (France) S Lefèvre	1	6	[13]

Semifinals
1	(Slovenia) A Klepač (Czech Republic) R Voráčová	6	5	[11]
3	(Romania) I-C Begu (Romania) E Bogdan	4	7	[13]
4	(Italy) ME Camerin (Turkey) İ Şenoğlu	7^{7}	3	[10]
2	(Russia) M Kondratieva (France) S Lefèvre	6^{4}	6	[4]

Final
3	(Romania) I-C Begu (Romania) E Bogdan	6^{1}	7^{7}	[16]
4	(Italy) ME Camerin (Turkey) İ Şenoğlu	7^{7}	6^{4}	[14]
