= 2012 BCR Open Romania Ladies =

- Date: July 16–22
- Edition: 6th
- Surface: Clay – Outdoor
- Location: Bucharest, Romania

Champions

Singles
- (Spain) María-Teresa Torró-Flor

Doubles
- (Romania) Irina-Camelia Begu / (France) Alizé Cornet
← 2011 ·	BCR Open Romania Ladies	· 2014 →

The 2012 BCR Open Romania Ladies was a professional tennis tournament played on outdoor clay courts. It was the 6th edition of the tournament and was part of the 2012 ITF Women's Circuit. It took place in Bucharest, Romania between 16 and 22 July 2012.

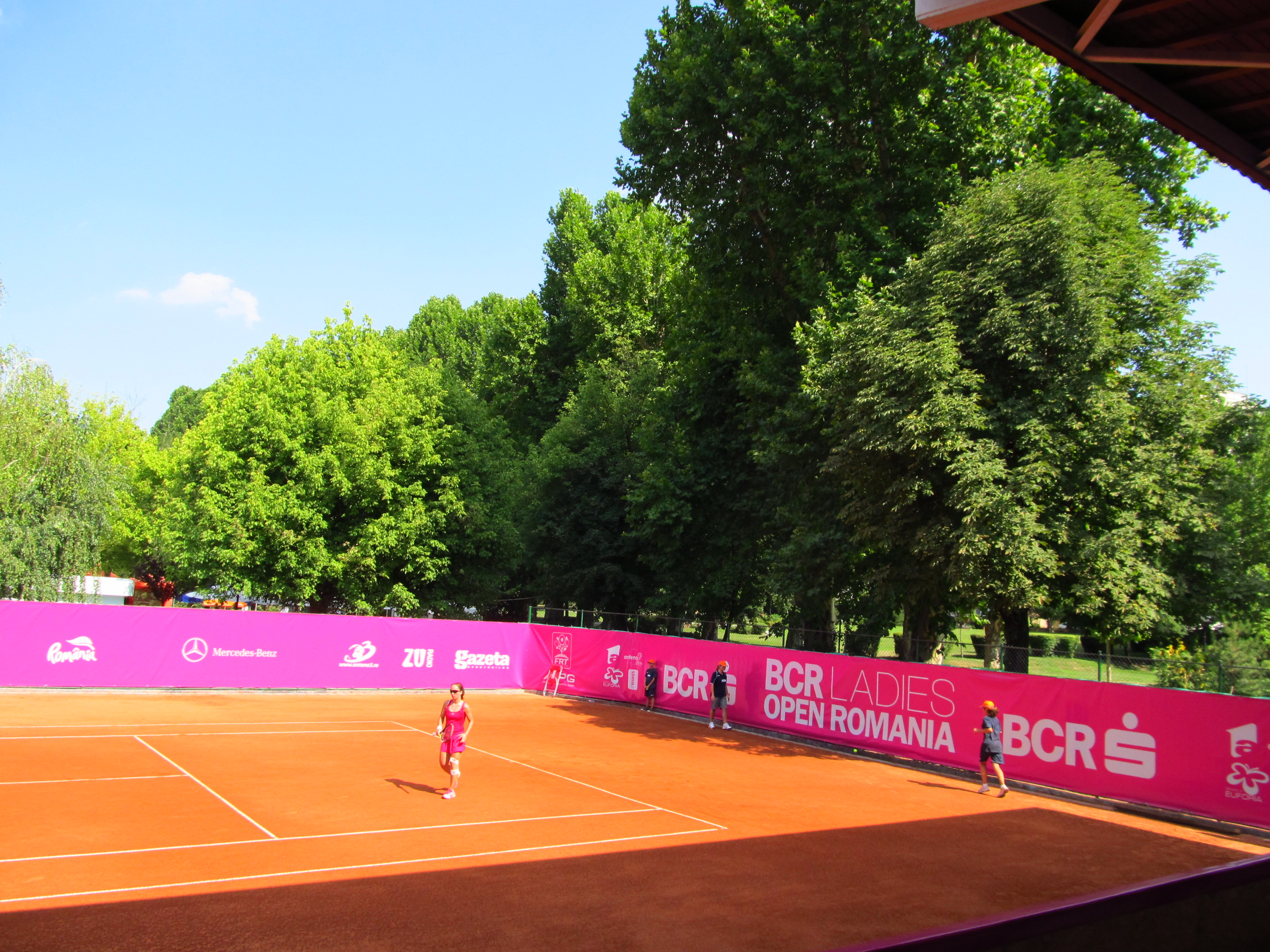
Court No. 1 at the 2012 BCR Open Romania Ladies

== WTA entrants ==
=== Seeds ===
Country	Player	Rank^{1}	Seed
FRA	Alizé Cornet	55	1
SUI	Romina Oprandi	66	2
ROU	Irina-Camelia Begu	73	3
ROU	Alexandra Cadanțu	85	4
FRA	Pauline Parmentier	97	5
ESP	Laura Pous Tió	102	6
FRA	Virginie Razzano	104	7
ESP	Garbiñe Muguruza	105	8

- Rankings are as of July 9, 2012.

=== Other entrants ===
The following players received wildcards into the singles main draw:

- (Romania) Elena Bogdan
- (Romania) Cristina Mitu
- (Romania) Raluca Olaru
- (Romania) Patricia Maria Țig

The following players received entry from the qualifying draw:

- (Netherlands) Daniëlle Harmsen
- (Croatia) Ana Savić
- (Spain) Rocío de la Torre-Sánchez
- (Spain) María-Teresa Torró-Flor

== Champions ==
=== Singles ===
- (Spain) María-Teresa Torró-Flor def. (Spain) Garbiñe Muguruza, 6–3, 4–6, 6–4

=== Doubles ===
- (Romania) Irina-Camelia Begu / (France) Alizé Cornet def. (Romania) Elena Bogdan / (Romania) Raluca Olaru, 6–2, 6–0
