= 2011 BCR Open Romania Ladies – Singles =

Singles
- 2011 BCR Open Romania Ladies

Final
- Champion: (Romania) Irina-Camelia Begu
- Runner-up: (Spain) Laura Pous Tió
- Score: 6–3, 7–5

Events
Singles	Doubles
← 2010 ·	BCR Open Romania Ladies	· 2012 →

Jelena Dokić was the defending champion, but chose not to participate.
Irina-Camelia Begu won the tournament defeating Laura Pous Tió in the final 6–3, 7–5.

== Seeds ==
1. (Romania) Simona Halep (semifinals)
2. (Romania) Irina-Camelia Begu (champion)
3. (Romania) Sorana Cîrstea (quarterfinals)
4. (Croatia) Petra Martić (withdrew)
5. (Spain) Laura Pous Tió (final)
6. (Spain) Carla Suárez Navarro (semifinals)
7. (Italy) Maria Elena Camerin (quarterfinals)
8. (Czech Republic) Renata Voráčová (second round)

== Main draw ==
=== Key ===
- Q = Qualifier
- WC = Wild card
- LL = Lucky loser
- Alt = Alternate
- SE = Special exempt
- PR = Protected ranking
- ITF = ITF entry
- JE = Junior exempt
- w/o = Walkover
- r = Retired
- d = Defaulted
- SR = Special ranking

=== Finals ===
Semifinals
1	(Romania) Simona Halep	0	3
5	(Spain) Laura Pous Tió	6	6
6	(Spain) Carla Suárez Navarro	4	5
2	(Romania) Irina-Camelia Begu	6	7

Final
5	(Spain) Laura Pous Tió	3	5
2	(Romania) Irina-Camelia Begu	6	7

=== Top half ===
First round
1	(Romania) S Halep	6	6
(Slovenia) M Zec Peškirič	2	2
Q	(Slovakia) L Juríková	6	6
WC	(Romania) C Dinu	0	2
(Italy) A Floris	2	6	5
(Romania) A Cadanţu	6	4	7
(France) L Thorpe	3	3
8	(Czech Republic) R Voráčová	6	6
3	(Romania) S Cîrstea	6	6
WC	(Romania) D Enache	3	4
(Romania) L Ungur	4	6	5
(Romania) M Gojnea	6	2	7
Q	(Spain) E Cabeza Candela	6	6
(Czech Republic) K Plíšková	3	2
(Romania) IR Olaru	1	4
5	(Spain) L Pous Tió	6	6

Second round
1	(Romania) S Halep	6	7^{7}
Q	(Slovakia) L Juríková	1	6^{5}
(Romania) A Cadanţu	6	6
8	(Czech Republic) R Voráčová	3	4
3	(Romania) S Cîrstea	6	6
(Romania) M Gojnea	1	3
Q	(Spain) E Cabeza Candela	3	3
5	(Spain) L Pous Tió	6	6

Quarterfinals
1	(Romania) S Halep	6	1	7^{7}
(Romania) A Cadanţu	3	6	6^{5}
3	(Romania) S Cîrstea	6^{6}	6	4
5	(Spain) L Pous Tió	7^{8}	1	6

Semifinals
1	(Romania) S Halep	0	3
5	(Spain) L Pous Tió	6	6

=== Bottom half ===
First round
6	(Spain) C Suárez Navarro	6	6
Q	(Spain) E Fernández-Brugués	2	4
Q	(Italy) A Bona	6	6
(Romania) E Bogdan	2	3
(Bulgaria) E Kostova	1	1
(Netherlands) K Bertens	6	6
(Switzerland) S Vögele	6	6
LL	(Romania) L-I Andrei	4	3
7	(Italy) ME Camerin	6	3	6
(Spain) B García Vidagany	3	6	3
(Japan) E Sema	6	6^{6}	6
WC	(Romania) E Dabija	2	7^{8}	1
WC	(Romania) C Mitu	6	6
(Kazakhstan) S Karatantcheva	4	2
(Italy) C Dentoni	3	4
2	(Romania) I-C Begu	6	6

Second round
6	(Spain) C Suárez Navarro	6	6
Q	(Italy) A Bona	3	2
(Netherlands) K Bertens	6	6
(Switzerland) S Vögele	2	1
7	(Italy) ME Camerin	7	6
(Japan) E Sema	5	2
WC	(Romania) C Mitu	1	1
2	(Romania) I-C Begu	6	6

Quarterfinals
6	(Spain) C Suárez Navarro	6	7^{11}
(Netherlands) K Bertens	2	6^{9}
7	(Italy) ME Camerin	6	0	0
2	(Romania) I-C Begu	2	6	6

Semifinals
6	(Spain) C Suárez Navarro	4	5
2	(Romania) I-C Begu	6	7
