= 2012 BCR Open Romania Ladies – Singles =

Singles
- 2012 BCR Open Romania Ladies

Final
- Champion: (Spain) María-Teresa Torró-Flor
- Runner-up: (Spain) Garbiñe Muguruza
- Score: 6–3, 4–6, 6–4

Details
- Draw: 32
- Seeds: 8

Events
Singles	Doubles
- BCR Open Romania Ladies

Irina-Camelia Begu was the defending champion, but lost in the quarterfinals against Garbiñe Muguruza.

María-Teresa Torró-Flor won the title defeating Garbiñe Muguruza in the final 6–3, 4–6, 6–4.

== Seeds ==
1. (France) Alizé Cornet (semifinals)
2. (Switzerland) Romina Oprandi (second round)
3. (Romania) Irina-Camelia Begu (quarterfinals)
4. (Romania) Alexandra Cadanțu (semifinals)
5. (France) Pauline Parmentier (quarterfinals)
6. (Spain) Laura Pous Tió (quarterfinals)
7. (France) Virginie Razzano (first round)
8. (Spain) Garbiñe Muguruza (final)

== Draw ==
Key

- Q = Qualifier
- WC = Wild card
- LL = Lucky loser
- Alt = Alternate
- ITF = ITF entry
- PR = Protected ranking
- SR = Special ranking
- SE = Special exempt
- JE = Junior exempt
- JR = Junior Accelerator Programme entrant
- CO = College Accelerator Programme entrant
- NG = Next Gen Accelerator Program entrant
- w/o = Walkover
- r = Retired
- d = Defaulted

=== Finals ===
Semifinals
1	(France) Alizé Cornet	6	2	4
8	(Spain) Garbiñe Muguruza	2	6	6
4	(Romania) Alexandra Cadanțu	7^{7}	5	1
Q	(Spain) María-Teresa Torró-Flor	6^{5}	7	6

Final
8	(Spain) Garbiñe Muguruza	3	6	4
Q	(Spain) María-Teresa Torró-Flor	6	4	6

=== Top half ===
First round
1	(France) A Cornet	6	6
(Germany) D Pfizenmaier	1	2
(Czech Republic) E Birnerová	6^{3}	6	6
Q	(Croatia) A Savić	7^{7}	4	3
WC	(Romania) C Mitu	2	7	6
(Argentina) P Ormaechea	6	5	4
(Argentina) F Molinero	3	6	4
6	(Spain) L Pous Tió	6	3	6
3	(Romania) I-C Begu	6	6
WC	(Romania) PM Țig	3	2
Q	(Spain) R de la Torre-Sánchez	0	3
(Switzerland) S Vögele	6	6
(Italy) K Knapp	4	6	6
(United States) J Cohen	6	2	4
(Romania) M Gojnea	2	4
8	(Spain) G Muguruza	6	6

Second round
1	(France) A Cornet	6	2	6
(Czech Republic) E Birnerová	4	6	4
WC	(Romania) C Mitu	6^{4}	6	3
6	(Spain) L Pous Tió	7^{7}	3	6
3	(Romania) I-C Begu	6	6
(Switzerland) S Vögele	3	1
(Italy) K Knapp	2	3
8	(Spain) G Muguruza	6	6

Quarterfinals
1	(France) A Cornet	6	6
6	(Spain) L Pous Tió	3	2
3	(Romania) I-C Begu	6	3	5
8	(Spain) G Muguruza	1	6	7

Semifinals
1	(France) A Cornet	6	2	4
8	(Spain) G Muguruza	2	6	6

=== Bottom half ===
First round
5	(France) P Parmentier	6	3	6
(France) C Garcia	0	6	4
(Italy) A Brianti	6	3	6
(Romania) M Buzărnescu	4	6	4
WC	(Romania) E Bogdan	7	7^{7}
(Italy) ME Camerin	5	6^{5}
(Italy) N Burnett	5	6	1
4	(Romania) A Cadanțu	7	4	6
7	(France) V Razzano	6	2	6^{2}
WC	(Romania) R Olaru	2	6	7^{7}
(Netherlands) B Schoofs	1	2
Q	(Spain) M-T Torró-Flor	6	6
(Spain) L Arruabarrena Vecino	6	6
(Bulgaria) E Kostova	3	3
Q	(Netherlands) D Harmsen	4	5
2	(Switzerland) R Oprandi	6	7

Second round
5	(France) P Parmentier	7	6
(Italy) A Brianti	5	1
WC	(Romania) E Bogdan	5	1
4	(Romania) A Cadanțu	7	6
WC	(Romania) R Olaru	4	3
Q	(Spain) M-T Torró-Flor	6	6
(Spain) L Arruabarrena Vecino	6	2	6
2	(Switzerland) R Oprandi	4	6	3

Quarterfinals
5	(France) P Parmentier	2	6	1
4	(Romania) A Cadanțu	6	4	6
Q	(Spain) M-T Torró-Flor	6	6
(Spain) L Arruabarrena Vecino	2	2

Semifinals
4	(Romania) A Cadanțu	7^{7}	5	1
Q	(Spain) M-T Torró-Flor	6^{5}	7	6
