= 2011 BCR Open Romania Ladies =

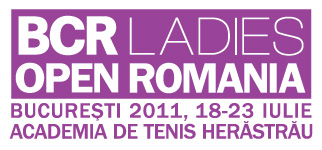
- Date: July 18 – July 23
- Edition: 5th
- Location: Bucharest, Romania

Champions

Singles
- (Romania) Irina-Camelia Begu

Doubles
- (Romania) Irina-Camelia Begu / (Romania) Elena Bogdan
← 2010 ·	BCR Open Romania Ladies	· 2012 →

The 2011 BCR Open Romania Ladies was a professional tennis tournament played on outdoor clay courts. It was the 5th edition of the tournament which was part of the 2011 ITF Women's Circuit. It took place in Bucharest, Romania between July 18 and July 23, 2011.

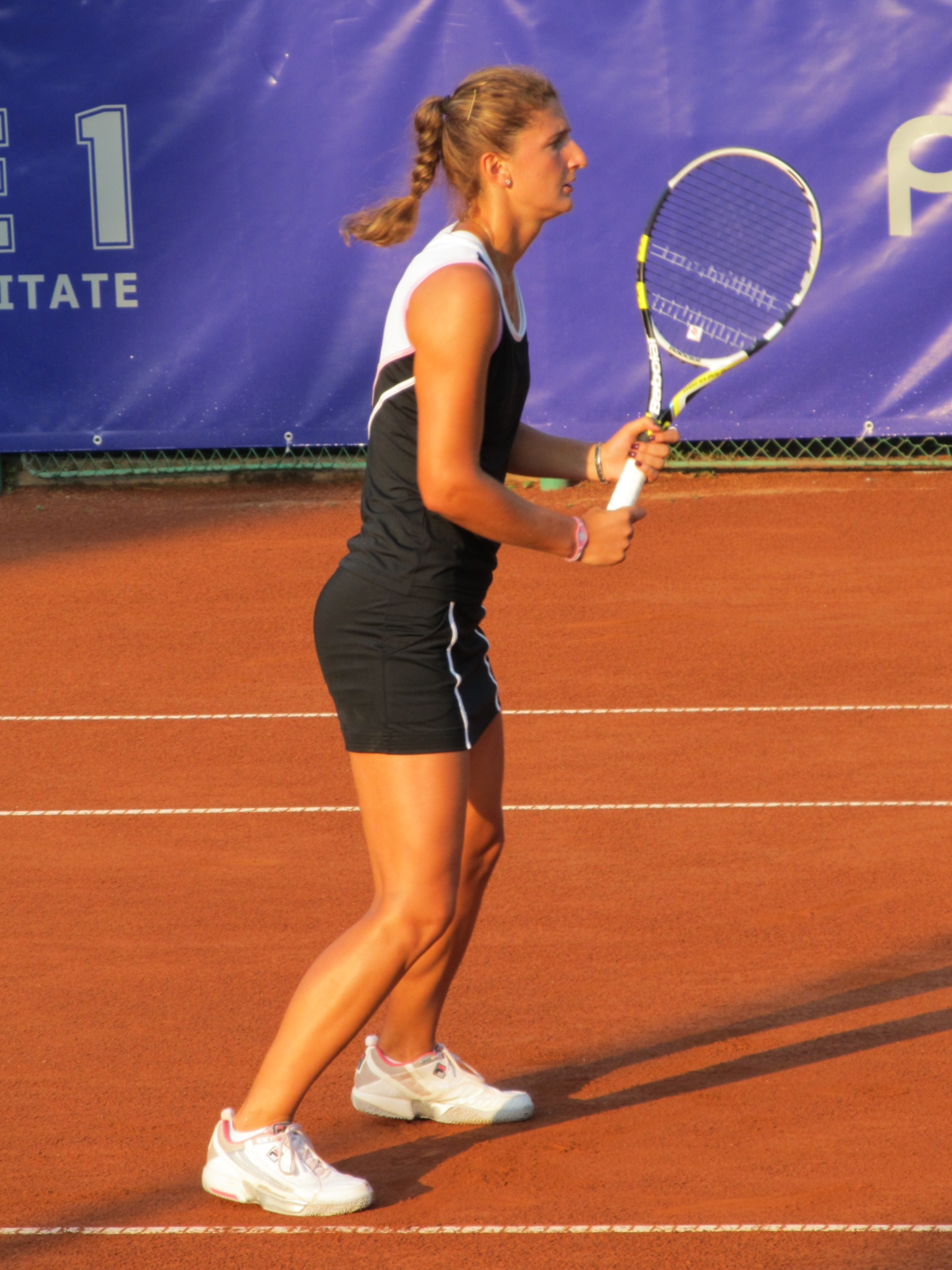
Romanian Irina-Camelia Begu lifted both the singles and the doubles trophies

== Singles entrants ==
=== Seeds ===
Country	Player	Rank^{1}	Seed
ROU	Simona Halep	59	1
ROU	Irina-Camelia Begu	60	2
ROU	Sorana Cîrstea	79	3
CRO	Petra Martić	89	4
ESP	Laura Pous Tió	94	5
ESP	Carla Suárez Navarro	103	6
ITA	Maria Elena Camerin	114	7
CZE	Renata Voráčová	129	8

- Rankings are as of July 11, 2011.

=== Other entrants ===
The following players received wildcards into the singles main draw:

- (Romania) Elora Dabija
- (Romania) Cristina Dinu
- (Romania) Diana Enache
- (Romania) Cristina Mitu

The following players received entry from the qualifying draw:

- (Italy) Annalisa Bona
- (Spain) Estrella Cabeza Candela
- (Spain) Eva Fernández-Brugués
- (Slovakia) Lenka Juríková

The following players received entry as a Lucky loser:

- (Romania) Laura-Ioana Andrei

== Champions ==
=== Singles ===
(Romania) Irina-Camelia Begu def. (Spain) Laura Pous Tió, 6–3, 7–5.

=== Doubles ===
(Romania) Irina-Camelia Begu / (Romania) Elena Bogdan def. (Italy) Maria Elena Camerin / (Turkey) İpek Şenoğlu, 6–7^{(1–7)}, 7–6^{(7–4)}, [16–14].
