= BCR Open Romania =

BCR Open Romania may refer to:

- BRD Năstase Ţiriac Trophy, an ATP men's tennis tournament formerly known as the 'BCR Open Romania'
- BCR Open Romania Ladies, an ITF women's tennis tournament
