= 2012 Grand Prix SAR La Princesse Lalla Meryem – Singles =

Singles
- 2012 Grand Prix SAR La Princesse Lalla Meryem

Final
- Champions: (Netherlands) Kiki Bertens
- Runners-up: (Spain) Laura Pous Tió
- Score: 7–5, 6–0

Details
- Draw: 32
- Seeds: 8

Events
Singles	Doubles
- Grand Prix SAR La Princesse Lalla Meryem

Alberta Brianti was the defending champion, but she lost in the first round to Alexandra Cadanțu.

Kiki Bertens won her first WTA Tour singles title as a qualifier, defeating Laura Pous Tió in the final, 7–5, 6–0.

== Seeds ==
1. (Spain) Anabel Medina Garrigues (quarterfinals)
2. (Russia) Svetlana Kuznetsova (second round, retired because of a left thigh injury)
3. (Czech Republic) Petra Cetkovská (quarterfinals)
4. (Belgium) Yanina Wickmayer (first round)
5. (Romania) Simona Halep (semifinals)
6. (South Africa) Chanelle Scheepers (second round)
7. (Czech Republic) Klára Zakopalová (first round)
8. (Israel) Shahar Pe'er (second round)

== Draw ==
Key

- Q = Qualifier
- WC = Wild card
- LL = Lucky loser
- Alt = Alternate
- ITF = ITF entry
- PR = Protected ranking
- SR = Special ranking
- SE = Special exempt
- JE = Junior exempt
- JR = Junior Accelerator Programme entrant
- CO = College Accelerator Programme entrant
- NG = Next Gen Accelerator Program entrant
- w/o = Walkover
- r = Retired
- d = Defaulted

=== Finals ===
Semifinals
5	(Romania) Simona Halep	3	4
Q	(Netherlands) Kiki Bertens	6	6
LL	(France) Mathilde Johansson	1	6	5
(Spain) Laura Pous Tió	6	2	7

Final
Q	(Netherlands) Kiki Bertens	7	6
(Spain) Laura Pous Tió	5	0

=== Top half ===
First round
1/WC	(Spain) A Medina Garrigues	6	6
(Russia) N Bratchikova	2	4
(Russia) A Panova	3	6^{10}
(Luxembourg) M Minella	6	7^{12}
(Italy) A Brianti	7	5	1
(Romania) A Cadanțu	5	7	6
WC	(Morocco) FZ El Allami	1^{r}
5	(Romania) S Halep	6
4	(Belgium) Y Wickmayer	4	2
(Austria) P Mayr-Achleitner	6	6
(Georgia (country)) A Tatishvili	5	7	4
Q	(Spain) G Muguruza Blanco	7	5	6
(Poland) U Radwańska	4	5
Q	(Netherlands) K Bertens	6	7
(Australia) An Rodionova	4	4
6	(South Africa) C Scheepers	6	6

Second round
1/WC	(Spain) A Medina Garrigues	6	6
(Luxembourg) M Minella	2	3
(Romania) A Cadanțu	2	5
5	(Romania) S Halep	6	7
(Austria) P Mayr-Achleitner	4	r
Q	(Spain) G Muguruza Blanco	6
Q	(Netherlands) K Bertens	7	1	6
6	(South Africa) C Scheepers	5	6	3

Quarterfinals
1/WC	(Spain) A Medina Garrigues	2	1
5	(Romania) S Halep	6	6
Q	(Spain) G Muguruza Blanco	1	4
Q	(Netherlands) K Bertens	6	6

Semifinals
5	(Romania) S Halep	3	4
Q	(Netherlands) K Bertens	6	6

=== Bottom half ===
First round
8	(Israel) S Pe'er	5	6	7
(Slovakia) M Rybáriková	7	3	5
LL	(France) M Johansson	6	6
WC	(Morocco) N Lalami	1	1
(Switzerland) T Bacsinszky	2	4
Q	(Russia) Ar Rodionova	6	0^{r}
Q	(Hungary) M Czink	4	2
3	(Czech Republic) P Cetkovská	6	6
7	(Czech Republic) K Zakopalová	4	7	6^{9}
(Netherlands) A Rus	6	5	7^{11}
(Spain) L Pous Tió	6	6
(Belarus) O Govortsova	2	1
(Hungary) T Babos	6^{3}	3
(Romania) I-C Begu	7^{7}	6
(Greece) E Daniilidou	1	5
2	(Russia) S Kuznetsova	6	7

Second round
8	(Israel) S Pe'er	6	3	2
LL	(France) M Johansson	4	6	6
(Switzerland) T Bacsinszky	3	2
3	(Czech Republic) P Cetkovská	6	6
(Netherlands) A Rus	3	5
(Spain) L Pous Tió	6	7
(Romania) I-C Begu	1	7^{7}	3
2	(Russia) S Kuznetsova	6	6^{4}	2^{r}

Quarterfinals
LL	(France) M Johansson	6	6
3	(Czech Republic) P Cetkovská	3	4
(Spain) L Pous Tió	6	6
(Romania) I-C Begu	4	1

Semifinals
LL	(France) M Johansson	1	6	5
(Spain) L Pous Tió	6	2	7

== Qualifying ==
=== Seeds ===
The top four seeds received a bye into the second round.

1. (Australia) Anastasia Rodionova (moved to Main Draw)
2. (Hungary) Melinda Czink (qualified)
3. (France) Mathilde Johansson (qualifying competition, lucky loser)
4. (Czech Republic) Eva Birnerová (second round)
5. (Czech Republic) Karolína Plíšková (second round)
6. (Spain) Lara Arruabarrena Vecino (second round)
7. (Kazakhstan) Yaroslava Shvedova (second round)
8. (France) Aravane Rezaï (second round)
9. (Spain) Garbiñe Muguruza Blanco (qualified)

=== Qualifiers ===
1. (Spain) Garbiñe Muguruza Blanco
2. (Hungary) Melinda Czink
3. (Russia) Arina Rodionova
4. (Netherlands) Kiki Bertens

=== Lucky loser ===
1. (France) Mathilde Johansson

=== Draw ===
==== First qualifier ====
First round
(France) Laura Thorpe	2	2
(France) Claire Feuerstein	6	6
(Peru) Bianca Botto	6	7^{7}
(France) Caroline Garcia	3	6^{5}
WC	(Morocco) Fatima Erraji	1	0
7	(Kazakhstan) Yaroslava Shvedova	6	6

Second round
9	(Spain) Garbiñe Muguruza Blanco	6	6
(France) Claire Feuerstein	3	3
(Peru) Bianca Botto	4	6	6
7	(Kazakhstan) Yaroslava Shvedova	6	2	1

Qualifying competition
9	(Spain) Garbiñe Muguruza Blanco	7	7
(Peru) Bianca Botto	5	5

==== Second qualifier ====
First round
(France) Séverine Beltrame	3	2
(Hungary) Réka-Luca Jani	6	6
(Bulgaria) Elitsa Kostova	4	6	1
8	(France) Aravane Rezaï	6	1	6

Second round
2	(Hungary) Melinda Czink	6	6
(Hungary) Réka-Luca Jani	1	4
(Russia) Ekaterina Ivanova	6	4	6
8	(France) Aravane Rezaï	4	6	4

Qualifying competition
2	(Hungary) Melinda Czink	6	6
(Russia) Ekaterina Ivanova	0	4

==== Third qualifier ====
First round
(Spain) Estrella Cabeza Candela	1	6	6
(Ukraine) Olga Savchuk	6	3	4
(Russia) Arina Rodionova	1	7	6
(Croatia) Darija Jurak	6	5	3
WC	(Morocco) Ghita Benhadi	0	0
5	(Czech Republic) Karolína Plíšková	6	6

Second round
3	(France) Mathilde Johansson	6	6
(Spain) Estrella Cabeza Candela	2	1
(Russia) Arina Rodionova	3	6	6
5	(Czech Republic) Karolína Plíšková	6	0	1

Qualifying competition
3	(France) Mathilde Johansson	7	4	3
(Russia) Arina Rodionova	5	6	6

==== Fourth qualifier ====
First round
(Czech Republic) Kristýna Plíšková	6	4	7
(Poland) Marta Domachowska	3	6	5
(Netherlands) Kiki Bertens	6	6
WC	(Morocco) Intissar Rassif	0	0
(Portugal) Maria João Koehler	6^{3}	2
6	(Spain) Lara Arruabarrena Vecino	7^{7}	6

Second round
4	(Czech Republic) Eva Birnerová	6^{1}	5
(Czech Republic) Kristýna Plíšková	7^{7}	7
(Netherlands) Kiki Bertens	3	6	6
6	(Spain) Lara Arruabarrena Vecino	6	1	4

Qualifying competition
(Czech Republic) Kristýna Plíšková	1	6	4
(Netherlands) Kiki Bertens	6	4	6
