= Tennis at the 2005 Mediterranean Games =

- Date: 27 June–3 July
- Location: Almeria Tennis Club

Champions

Men's singles
- Nicolás Almagro (ESP)

Women's singles
- Laura Pous (ESP)

Men's doubles
- Nicolás Almagro / Guillermo García-López (ESP)

Women's doubles
- Laura Pous / Nuria Llagostera (ESP)
- Mediterranean Games

The Tennis Tournament at the 2005 Mediterranean Games was held in the Almería Tennis Club in Almería, Spain from June 27 to July 3.

== Men's final eight ==
Quarterfinals
1	(Spain) Nicolás Almagro	6	6
6	(Slovenia) Boštjan Ošabnik	3	4
4	(Morocco) Mounir El Aarej	6	6
5	(Algeria) Lamine Ouahab	3	3
–	(Slovenia) Grega Žemlja	2	1
3	(Italy) Simone Bolelli	6	6
7	(Algeria) Slimane Saoudi	2	3
2	(Spain) Guillermo García-López	6	6

Semifinals
1	(Spain) Nicolás Almagro	6	5	7
4	(Morocco) Mounir El Aarej	4	7	6^{4}
3	(Italy) Simone Bolelli	4	2
2	(Spain) Guillermo García-López	6	6

Finals
1	(Spain) Nicolás Almagro	6	7
2	(Spain) Guillermo García-López	2	5
Third place
4	(Morocco) Mounir El Aarej	3	6	1
3	(Italy) Simone Bolelli	6	3	6

== Women's final eight ==
Quarterfinals
1	(Spain) Nuria Llagostera	6	6
–	(Italy) Verdiana Verardi	3	4
4	(Morocco) Habiba Ifrakh	5	3
3	(Croatia) Matea Mezak	7	6
–	(Serbia and Montenegro) Ana Jovanović	1	1
–	(Italy) Stefania Chieppa	6	6
–	(Croatia) Ana Vrljić	5	5
2	(Spain) Laura Pous	7	7

Semifinals
1	(Spain) Nuria Llagostera	6	6
3	(Croatia) Matea Mezak	1	2
–	(Italy) Stefania Chieppa	2	4
2	(Spain) Laura Pous	6	6

Finals
1	(Spain) Nuria Llagostera	2	1
2	(Spain) Laura Pous	6	6
Third place
3	(Croatia) Matea Mezak	6	5	6
–	(Italy) Stefania Chieppa	3	7	2
