= 2012 BCR Open Romania Ladies – Doubles =

Doubles
- 2012 BCR Open Romania Ladies

Final
- Champions: (Romania) Irina-Camelia Begu (France) Alizé Cornet
- Runners-up: (Romania) Elena Bogdan (Romania) Raluca Olaru
- Score: 6–2, 6–0

Details
- Draw: 16
- Seeds: 4

Events
Singles	Doubles
- BCR Open Romania Ladies

Irina-Camelia Begu and Elena Bogdan were the defending champions, but they did not partner up together. Begu partnered up with Alizé Cornet and successfully defended her title defeating Elena Bogdan and Raluca Olaru in the final 6–2, 6–0.

== Seeds ==
1. (Romania) Irina-Camelia Begu / (France) Alizé Cornet (champions)
2. (Romania) Elena Bogdan / (Romania) Raluca Olaru (final)
3. (France) Pauline Parmentier / (France) Virginie Razzano (withdrew)
4. (Czech Republic) Eva Birnerová / (France) Caroline Garcia (quarterfinals)

== Draw ==
Key

- Q = Qualifier
- WC = Wild card
- LL = Lucky loser
- Alt = Alternate
- ITF = ITF entry
- PR = Protected ranking
- SR = Special ranking
- SE = Special exempt
- JE = Junior exempt
- JR = Junior Accelerator Programme entrant
- CO = College Accelerator Programme entrant
- NG = Next Gen Accelerator Program entrant
- w/o = Walkover
- r = Retired
- d = Defaulted

=== Draw ===
First round
1	(Romania) I-C Begu (France) A Cornet	6	6
(Australia) S Bengson (Spain) L Pous Tió	2	2
(Bulgaria) E Kostova (Romania) Á Szatmári	4	6	[10]
(Romania) M Buzărnescu (United States) J Cohen	6	3	[3]
4	(Czech Republic) E Birnerová (France) C Garcia	6	6
(Spain) R de la Torre-Sánchez (Argentina) F Molinero	2	1
(Romania) C Hristea (Romania) D Marcu	3	3
(Romania) M Gojnea (Romania) C Mitu	6	6
(Italy) A Brianti (Italy) N Burnett	6	7
WC	(Romania) B Hîncu (Romania) I-A Iova	4	5
WC	(Romania) IM Bara (Romania) PM Țig	6	6
Alt	(Turkey) H Esen (Turkey) L Esen	2	1
(Romania) D Buzean (Netherlands) D Harmsen	1	4
(Spain) L Arruabarrena Vecino (Italy) ME Camerin	6	6
(Romania) L-I Andrei (Romania) RE Platon	6^{6}	1
2	(Romania) E Bogdan (Romania) R Olaru	7^{8}	6

Quarterfinals
1	(Romania) I-C Begu (France) A Cornet	6	6
(Bulgaria) E Kostova (Romania) Á Szatmári	1	1
4	(Czech Republic) E Birnerová (France) C Garcia	5	3
(Romania) M Gojnea (Romania) C Mitu	7	6
(Italy) A Brianti (Italy) N Burnett	6	6
WC	(Romania) IM Bara (Romania) PM Țig	2	3
(Spain) L Arruabarrena Vecino (Italy) ME Camerin	6^{7}	1
2	(Romania) E Bogdan (Romania) R Olaru	7^{9}	6

Semifinals
1	(Romania) I-C Begu (France) A Cornet	6	7
(Romania) M Gojnea (Romania) C Mitu	4	5
(Italy) A Brianti (Italy) N Burnett	4	3
2	(Romania) E Bogdan (Romania) R Olaru	6	6

Finals
1	(Romania) I-C Begu (France) A Cornet	6	6
2	(Romania) E Bogdan (Romania) R Olaru	2	0
