= 2012 Grand Prix SAR La Princesse Lalla Meryem – Doubles =

Doubles
- 2012 Grand Prix SAR La Princesse Lalla Meryem

Final
- Champions: (Czech Republic) Petra Cetkovská (Russia) Alexandra Panova
- Runners-up: (Romania) Irina-Camelia Begu (Romania) Alexandra Cadanțu
- Score: 3–6, 7–6^{(7–5)}, [11–9]

Events
Singles	Doubles
← 2011 ·	Grand Prix SAR La Princesse Lalla Meryem	· 2013 →

Andrea Hlaváčková and Renata Voráčová were the defending champions but decided not to participate.
Petra Cetkovská and Alexandra Panova won the final over Irina-Camelia Begu and Alexandra Cadanțu, 3–6, 7–6^{(7–5)}, [11–9].

== Seeds ==
1. (Australia) Anastasia Rodionova / (Russia) Arina Rodionova (first round, retired due to Rodionova's left wrist injury)
2. (Greece) Eleni Daniilidou / (Czech Republic) Klára Zakopalová (withdrew)
3. (Russia) Nina Bratchikova / (Croatia) Darija Jurak (quarterfinals)
4. (Belarus) Olga Govortsova / (Ukraine) Olga Savchuk (quarterfinals)

== Draw ==
=== Key ===
- Q = Qualifier
- WC = Wild card
- LL = Lucky loser
- Alt = Alternate
- SE = Special exempt
- PR = Protected ranking
- ITF = ITF entry
- JE = Junior exempt
- w/o = Walkover
- r = Retired
- d = Defaulted
- SR = Special ranking

=== Draw ===
First round
1	(Australia) An Rodionova (Russia) Ar Rodionova	0	r
(Czech Republic) Ka Plíšková (Czech Republic) Kr Plíšková	2
(Poland) U Radwańska (Georgia (country)) A Tatishvili	5	6	[10]
(Slovakia) J Husárová (Hungary) K Marosi	7	1	[8]
3	(Russia) N Bratchikova (Croatia) D Jurak	7^{7}	7
(United States) L Lee-Waters (United States) M Moulton-Levy	6^{5}	5
(Switzerland) T Bacsinszky (Italy) A Brianti	0	6	[5]
(Romania) I-C Begu (Romania) A Cadanțu	6	1	[10]
(Spain) E Cabeza Candela (Spain) L Pous Tió	3	1
(Hungary) T Babos (Luxembourg) M Minella	6	6
WC	(Hungary) M Czink (South Africa) C Scheepers	1	3
4	(Belarus) O Govortsova (Ukraine) O Savchuk	6	6
(Czech Republic) P Cetkovská (Russia) A Panova	6	6
WC	(Morocco) FZ El Allami (Morocco) N Lalami	3	2
(Spain) L Arruabarrena Vecino (Russia) E Ivanova	2	2
Alt	(Netherlands) K Bertens (Netherlands) A Rus	6	6

Quarterfinals
(Czech Republic) Ka Plíšková (Czech Republic) Kr Plíšková	6	6
(Poland) U Radwańska (Georgia (country)) A Tatishvili	4	3
3	(Russia) N Bratchikova (Croatia) D Jurak	2	6	[14]
(Romania) I-C Begu (Romania) A Cadanțu	6	4	[16]
(Hungary) T Babos (Luxembourg) M Minella	6	6
4	(Belarus) O Govortsova (Ukraine) O Savchuk	2	2
(Czech Republic) P Cetkovská (Russia) A Panova	6	6
Alt	(Netherlands) K Bertens (Netherlands) A Rus	4	0

Semifinals
(Czech Republic) Ka Plíšková (Czech Republic) Kr Plíšková	4	6	[5]
(Romania) I-C Begu (Romania) A Cadanțu	6	4	[10]
(Hungary) T Babos (Luxembourg) M Minella	7^{7}	2	[5]
(Czech Republic) P Cetkovská (Russia) A Panova	6^{5}	6	[10]

Final
(Romania) I-C Begu (Romania) A Cadanțu	6	6^{5}	[9]
(Czech Republic) P Cetkovská (Russia) A Panova	3	7^{7}	[11]
