= 2012 Grand Prix SAR La Princesse Lalla Meryem =

- Date: 23 – 29 April
- Edition: 12th
- Category: WTA International
- Draw: 32S / 16D
- Prize money: US$220,000
- Surface: Clay / outdoor
- Location: Fés, Morocco

Champions

Singles
- (Netherlands) Kiki Bertens

Doubles
- (Czech Republic) Petra Cetkovská / (Russia) Alexandra Panova
- Morocco Open

The 2012 Grand Prix SAR La Princesse Lalla Meryem was a professional women's tennis tournament played on outdoor clay courts. It was the twelfth edition of the tournament which was part of the WTA International tournaments of the 2012 WTA Tour. It took place in Fés, Morocco from 23 to 29 April 2012. Qualifier Kiki Bertens won the singles title.

== Singles main draw entrants ==
=== Seeds ===
Country	Player	Rank^{1}	Seed
ESP	Anabel Medina Garrigues	26	1
RUS	Svetlana Kuznetsova	27	2
CZE	Petra Cetkovská	30	3
BEL	Yanina Wickmayer	31	4
ROU	Simona Halep	42	5
RSA	Chanelle Scheepers	44	6
CZE	Klára Zakopalová	47	7
ISR	Shahar Pe'er	55	8

- ^{1} Rankings are as of April 16, 2012

=== Other entrants ===
The following players received wildcards into the singles main draw:

- (Spain) Anabel Medina Garrigues
- (Morocco) Nadia Lalami
- (Morocco) Fatima Zahrae El Allami

The following players received entry from the qualifying draw:

- (Netherlands) Kiki Bertens
- (Hungary) Melinda Czink
- (Spain) Garbiñe Muguruza Blanco
- (Russia) Arina Rodionova

The following players received entry as lucky loser:

- (France) Mathilde Johansson

=== Withdrawals ===
- (Slovenia) Polona Hercog
- (Russia) Ekaterina Makarova
- (Kazakhstan) Ksenia Pervak

=== Retirements ===
- (Morocco) Fatima Zahrae El Allami (gastro intestinal illness)
- (Russia) Svetlana Kuznetsova (left thigh injury)
- (Austria) Patricia Mayr-Achleitner (right hip injury)
- (Russia) Arina Rodionova (left wrist injury)

== Doubles main draw entrants ==
=== Seeds ===
Country	Player	Country	Player	Rank^{1}	Seed
AUS	Anastasia Rodionova	RUS	Arina Rodionova	113	1
~~GRE~~	~~Eleni Daniilidou~~	~~CZE~~	~~Klára Zakopalová~~	~~135~~	~~2~~
RUS	Nina Bratchikova	CRO	Darija Jurak	141	3
BLR	Olga Govortsova	UKR	Olga Savchuk	168	4

- ^{1} Rankings are as of April 16, 2012

=== Other entrants ===
The following pairs received wildcards into the doubles main draw:

- (Hungary) Melinda Czink / (South Africa) Chanelle Scheepers
- (Morocco) Fatima Zahrae El Allami / (Morocco) Nadia Lalami

The following pair received entry as alternates:

- (Netherlands) Kiki Bertens / (Netherlands) Arantxa Rus

=== Withdrawals ===
- (Czech Republic) Klára Zakopalová

=== Retirements ===
- (Russia) Arina Rodionova (left wrist injury)

== Finals ==
=== Singles ===
- (Netherlands) Kiki Bertens defeated (Spain) Laura Pous Tió, 7–5, 6–0

It was Bertens' first career title.

=== Doubles ===
- (Czech Republic) Petra Cetkovská / (Russia) Alexandra Panova defeated (Romania) Irina-Camelia Begu / (Romania) Alexandra Cadanțu, 3–6, 7–6^{(7–5)}, [11–9]
