= Verdiana Verardi =

Italian tennis player (born 1987)

- Country (sports): Italy
- Born: 16 December 1987 (age 38)
- Turned pro: 2003
- Retired: 2011
- Plays: Right (two-handed backhand)
- Prize money: $53,034

Singles
- Career record: 174–122
- Career titles: 4 ITF
- Highest ranking: No. 358 (15 June 2009)

Doubles
- Career record: 71–43
- Career titles: 10 ITF
- Highest ranking: No. 287 (7 May 2007)
Medal record
Women's tennis
Representing Italy
Mediterranean Games
Bronze medal – third place	2005 Almería	Women's doubles

Verdiana Verardi (born 16 December 1987) is an Italian former professional tennis player.

Verardi has career-high WTA rankings of 358 in singles, achieved on 15 June 2009, and 287 in doubles, set on 7 May 2007. She won four singles and ten doubles titles on the ITF Women's Circuit.

In 2005, she played for Italy in the Mediterranean Games in Almería (Spain) where she won the bronze medal in women's doubles.

She retired from tennis due to a serious shoulder injury and personal issues.

== ITF Circuit finals ==
$50,000 tournaments
$25,000 tournaments
$10,000 tournaments

=== Singles: 11 (4 titles, 7 runner–ups) ===
Result	W–L	Date	Tournament	Tier	Surface	Opponent	Score
Loss	0–1	Jul 2005	ITF Monteroni, Italy	10,000	Clay	(Italy) Corinna Dentoni	0–6, 7–5, 4–6
Loss	0–2	Jul 2005	ITF Ancona, Italy	10,000	Clay	(Italy) Claudia Ivone	3–6, 4–6
Loss	0–3	Aug 2006	ITF Westende, Belgium	10,000	Hard	(France) Claire de Gubernatis	3–6, 3–6
Win	1–3	Oct 2006	ITF Benicarló, Spain	10,000	Clay	(Ukraine) Veronika Kapshay	6–4, 6–4
Win	2–3	Oct 2006	ITF Seville, Spain	10,000	Clay	(Serbia) Ana Timotić	6–4, 6–4
Win	3–3	Aug 2007	ITF Gardone Val Trompia, Italy	10,000	Clay	(Italy) Federica Di Sarra	4–6, 6–4, 6–3
Loss	3–4	Sep 2007	ITF Ciampino, Italy	10,000	Clay	(Italy) Valentina Sassi	1–6, 6–1, 3–6
Loss	3–5	Mar 2009	ITF Bath, United Kingdom	10,000	Hard (i)	(France) Stéphanie Vongsouthi	2–6, 4–6
Win	4–5	May 2009	ITF Bucharest, Romania	10,000	Clay	(Romania) Elena Bogdan	3–6, 7–5, 6–1
Loss	4–6	May 2010	ITF Rivoli, Italy	10,000	Clay	(Morocco) Nadia Lalami	4–6, 2–6
Loss	4–7	Jul 2010	ITF Imola, Italy	10,000	Clay	(Italy) Gioia Barbieri	1–6, 1–6

=== Doubles: 18 (10 titles, 8 runner–ups) ===
Result	W–L	Date	Tournament	Tier	Surface	Partner	Opponents	Score
Win	1–0	Sep 2004	ITF Ciampino, Italy	10,000	Clay	(Italy) Giulia Meruzzi	(Italy) Raffaella Bindi (Italy) Francesca Frappi	0–6, 6–4, 6–2
Loss	1–1	Apr 2005	ITF Bath, United Kingdom	10,000	Hard	(Germany) Vanessa Pinto	(United Kingdom) Anna Hawkins (United Kingdom) Rebecca Llewellyn	6–3, 1–6, 4–6
Win	2–1	Jul 2005	ITF Monteroni, Italy	10,000	Clay	(Italy) Giulia Meruzzi	(Italy) Silvia Disderi (Italy) Giorgia Mortello	7–6^{(4)}, 7–6^{(1)}
Win	3–1	Jul 2006	ITF Napoli, Italy	10,000	Clay	(Italy) Valentina Sulpizio	(Italy) Emilia Desiderio (Austria) Stefanie Haidner	6–1, 6–3
Win	4–1	Jul 2006	ITF Gardone Val Trompia, Italy	10,000	Clay	(Italy) Valentina Sulpizio	(Italy) Emilia Desiderio (France) Anaïs Laurendon	6–1, 6–3
Loss	4–2	Aug 2006	ITF Rebecq, Belgium	10,000	Clay	(France) Claire de Gubernatis	(Netherlands) Daniëlle Harmsen (Belgium) Jessie de Vries	4–6, 2–6
Loss	4–3	Oct 2006	ITF Granada, Spain	10,000	Clay	(Spain) Carolina Gago Fuentes	(Spain) Beatriz García Vidagany (Russia) Julia Parasyuk	4–6, 4–6
Win	5–3	Oct 2006	ITF Benicarló, Spain	10,000	Clay	(Spain) Nuria Sánchez García	(Ukraine) Veronika Kapshay (Spain) Gabriela Velasco Andreu	6–4, 6–3
Win	6–3	Mar 2007	ITF Sabadell, Spain	10,000	Clay	(Spain) Nuria Sánchez García	(Italy) Nicole Clerico (France) Violette Huck	6–3, 7–6^{(5)}
Loss	6–4	Apr 2007	ITF Torhout, Belgium	10,000	Hard	(Italy) Elena Pioppo	(Slovakia) Martina Babáková (Netherlands) Kika Hogendoorn	6–7^{(2)}, 3–6
Win	7–4	Jun 2007	ITF Tortosa, Spain	10,000	Clay	(Italy) Valentina Sulpizio	(Argentina) Paula Cantarutti (Spain) Sabina Mediano Alvarez	7–5, 7–5
Loss	7–5	Jul 2007	ITF Monteroni d'Arbia, Italy	25,000	Clay	(Italy) Elena Pioppo	(Russia) Alisa Kleybanova (Italy) Valentina Sassi	5–7, 2–6
Win	8–4	Aug 2007	ITF Wrexham, United Kingdom	10,000	Hard	(Italy) Nicole Clerico	(United Kingdom) Katharina Brown (India) Tara Iyer	6–4, 6–3
Win	9–4	Sep 2007	ITF Ciampino, Italy	10,000	Clay	(Italy) Valentina Sulpizio	(Italy) Astrid Besser (Italy) Letizia Lo Re	6–3, 6–4
Win	10–4	Apr 2008	ITF Torrent, Spain	10,000	Clay	(Italy) Elena Pioppo	(Russia) Julia Parasyuk (Germany) Dominice Ripoll	7–5, 4–6, [10–5]
Loss	10–6	Aug 2008	ITF Monteroni d'Arbia, Italy	25,000	Clay	(Italy) Valentina Sulpizio	(Bosnia and Herzegovina) Mervana Jugić-Salkić (France) Aurélie Védy	4–6, 2–6
Loss	10–7	Sep 2010	ITF Bassano del Grappa, Italy	10,000	Clay	(Italy) Giulia Gasparri	(Italy) Federica Grazioso (Italy) Vivienne Vierin	1–6, 3–6
Loss	10–8	Oct 2010	ITF Antalya, Turkey	10,000	Clay	(Italy) Giulia Gasparri	(Russia) Viktoria Kamenskaya (Russia) Ksenia Kirillova	7–6^{(10)}, 3–6, [3–10]
