= Elena Bogdan =

Romanian tennis player (born 1992)

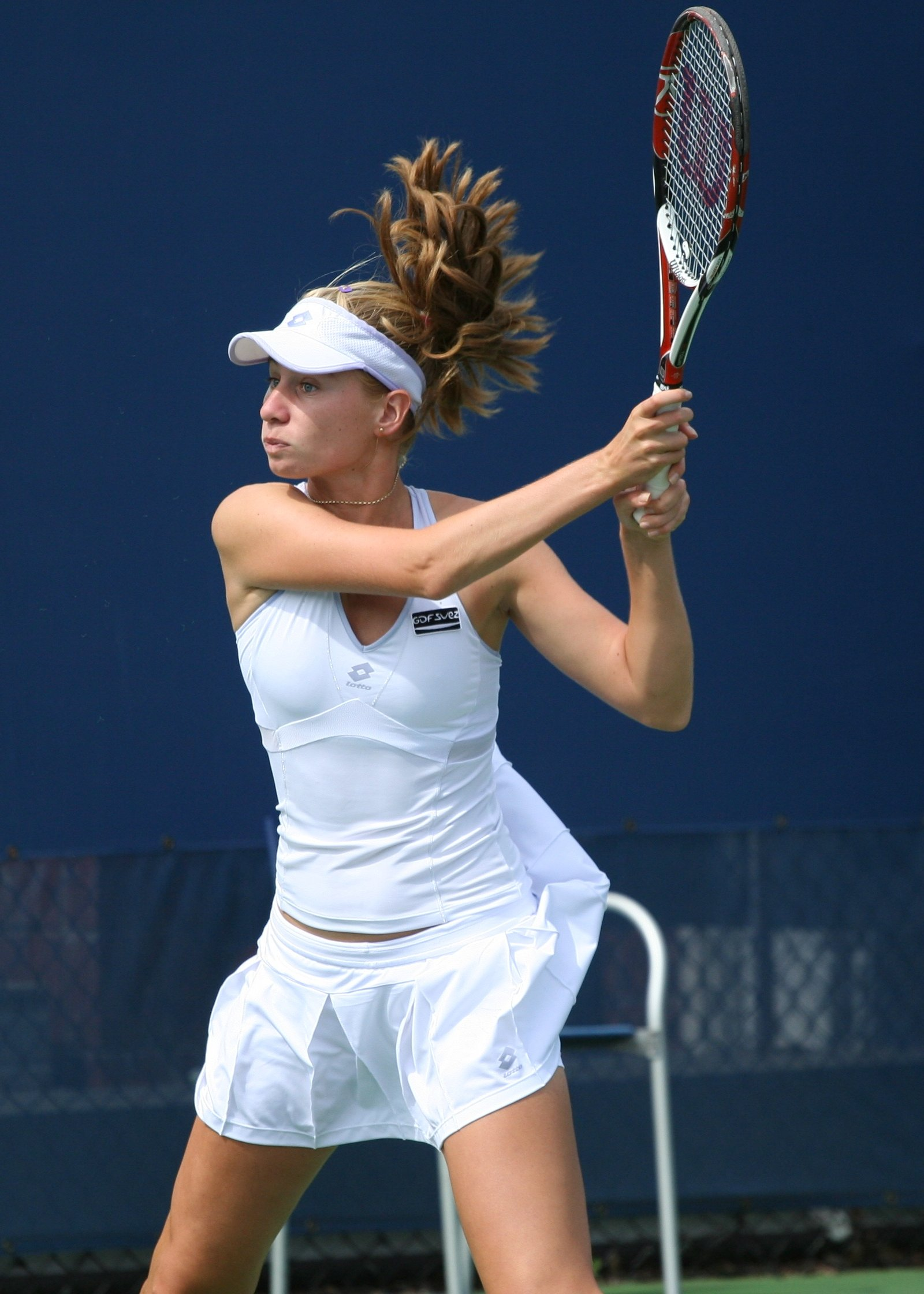
- Country (sports): Romania
- Residence: Craiova, Romania
- Born: 28 March 1992 (age 34) Craiova
- Height: 1.83 m (6 ft 0 in)
- Turned pro: 2009
- Plays: Left (two-handed backhand)
- Prize money: $255,436

Singles
- Career record: 227–209
- Career titles: 4 ITF
- Highest ranking: No. 151 (18 July 2011)

Grand Slam singles results
- Australian Open: Q1 (2011, 2012)
- French Open: Q3 (2011, 2012)
- Wimbledon: Q2 (2011)
- US Open: Q1 (2011, 2012)

Doubles
- Career record: 261–203
- Career titles: 1 WTA, 22 ITF
- Highest ranking: No. 79 (8 June 2015)

Grand Slam doubles results
- French Open: 1R (2015)
- Wimbledon: 1R (2015)

Elena Bogdan (born 28 March 1992) is a former tennis player from Romania.

On 18 July 2011, she achieved her career-high singles ranking of world No. 151. On 8 June 2015, she peaked at No. 79 in the WTA doubles rankings.

== Career overview ==
=== Juniors ===
At the 2008 French Open, she reached the final of the girls' singles tournament but lost to Simona Halep in three sets. In 2009, she won the French Open girls' doubles title, partnering Noppawan Lertcheewakarn of Thailand. In the final, they beat Tímea Babos and Heather Watson, in three sets.

== WTA Tour finals ==
=== Doubles: 1 (title) ===
Legend International (1–0)	Finals by surface Clay (1–0)

Result	Date	Tournament	Tier	Surface	Partner	Opponents	Score
Win	Jul 2014	Bucharest Open, Romania	International	Clay	(Romania) Alexandra Cadanțu	(Turkey) Çağla Büyükakçay (Italy) Karin Knapp	6–4, 3–6, [10–5]

== ITF Circuit finals ==
Legend
$100,000 tournaments
$75,000 tournaments
$50/60,000 tournaments
$25,000 tournaments
$15,000 tournaments
$10,000 tournaments

=== Singles: 8 (4 titles, 4 runner-ups) ===
Result	W–L	Date	Tournament	Tier	Surface	Opponent	Score
Loss	0–1	May 2008	ITF Bucharest, Romania	10,000	Clay	(Romania) Simona Halep	1–6, 3–6
Loss	0–2	May 2009	ITF Bucharest, Romania	10,000	Clay	(Italy) Verdiana Verardi	6–3, 5–7, 1–6
Win	1–2	Jun 2009	ITF Bucharest, Romania	10,000	Clay	(Romania) Simona Matei	6–4, 6–3
Win	2–2	Jul 2009	ITF Bucharest, Romania	10,000	Clay	(Bulgaria) Dia Evtimova	6–3, 6–1
Win	3–2	Oct 2010	Internacional de Madrid, Spain	50,000	Clay	(Spain) Leticia Costas	6–4, 6–2
Loss	3–3	Oct 2011	ITF Dobrich, Bulgaria	25,000	Clay	(Bulgaria) Elitsa Kostova	6–7^{(6)}, 2–6
Win	4–3	Jun 2014	ITF Galați, Romania	10,000	Clay	(Romania) Oana Georgeta Simion	6–3, 6–1
Loss	4–4	Oct 2014	ITF Albena, Bulgaria	10,000	Clay	(Czech Republic) Pernilla Mendesová	4–6, 6–0, 3–6

=== Doubles: 45 (22 titles, 23 runner-ups) ===
Result	W–L	Date	Tournament	Surface	Partner	Opponents	Score
Loss	0–1	Sep 2008	ITF Sandanski, Bulgaria	Clay	(Ukraine) Alyona Sotnikova	(Romania) Laura-Ioana Andrei (Poland) Sylwia Zagórska	3–6, 1–6
Loss	0–2	Apr 2009	ITF Hvar, Croatia	Clay	(Czech Republic) Martina Borecká	(Hungary) Réka Luca Jani (Czech Republic) Martina Kubičíková	4–6, 6–0, [6–10]
Loss	0–3	Mar 2010	ITF Lyon, France	Hard	(France) Stéphanie Vongsouthi	(Poland) Olga Brózda (Poland) Magdalena Kiszczyńska	7–5, 4–6, [6–10]
Loss	0–4	Jul 2010	ITF Aschaffenburg, Germany	Clay	(Chile) Andrea Koch Benvenuto	(Serbia) Teodora Mirčić (Japan) Erika Sema	6–7^{(4)}, 6–2, [8–10]
Win	1–4	Jul 2010	Open Romania Ladies	Clay	(Romania) Irina-Camelia Begu	(Argentina) María Irigoyen (Argentina) Florencia Molinero	6–1, 6–1
Win	2–4	Sep 2010	ITF Bucharest, Romania	Clay	(Romania) Irina-Camelia Begu	(Spain) Leticia Costas (Spain) Eva Fernández Brugués	6–1, 6–3
Loss	2–5	Oct 2010	Internacional de Madrid, Spain	Clay	(Romania) Irina-Camelia Begu	(Spain) Lara Arruabarrena (Spain) María Teresa Torró Flor	4–6, 5–7
Win	3–5	Feb 2011	Copa Bionaire, Colombia	Clay	(Romania) Irina-Camelia Begu	(Russia) Ekaterina Ivanova (Germany) Kathrin Wörle	2–6, 7–6^{(6)}, [11–9]
Loss	3–6	Jul 2011	ITF Craiova, Romania	Clay	(Romania) Mihaela Buzărnescu	(Romania) Diana Enache (Netherlands) Daniëlle Harmsen	6–4, 6–7^{(5)}, [6–10]
Win	4–6	Jul 2011	Open Romania Ladies (2)	Clay	(Romania) Irina-Camelia Begu	(Italy) Maria Elena Camerin (Turkey) İpek Şenoğlu	6–7^{(1)}, 7–6^{(4)}, [16–14]
Loss	4–7	Jul 2011	ITS Cup Olomouc, Czech Republic	Clay	(Ukraine) Yulia Beygelzimer	(Netherlands) Michaëlla Krajicek (Czech Republic) Renata Voráčová	5–7, 4–6
Win	5–7	Sep 2011	ITF Mamaia, Romania	Clay	(Romania) Alexandra Cadanțu	(Russia) Marina Shamayko (Georgia (country)) Sofia Shapatava	6–2, 6–2
Loss	5–8	Sep 2011	ITF Tbilisi, Georgia	Clay	(Chile) Andrea Koch Benvenuto	(Ukraine) Irina Buryachok (Hungary) Réka Luca Jani	6–7^{(3)}, 2–6
Win	6–8	Oct 2011	Telavi Open, Georgia	Clay	(Romania) Mihaela Buzărnescu	(Georgia (country)) Ekaterine Gorgodze (Italy) Anastasia Grymalska	1–6, 6–1, [10–3]
Win	7–8	Apr 2012	ITF Civitavecchia, Italy	Clay	(Romania) Raluca Olaru	(Italy) Claudia Giovine (Russia) Marina Shamayko	6–3, 7–5
Win	8–8	Apr 2012	Nana Trophy Tunis, Tunisia	Clay	(Romania) Raluca Olaru	(Spain) Inés Ferrer Suárez (Netherlands) Richèl Hogenkamp	6–4, 6–3
Loss	8–9	May 2012	ITF Casablanca, Morocco	Clay	(Romania) Raluca Olaru	(Ukraine) Olga Savchuk (Czech Republic) Renata Voráčová	1–6, 4–6
Win	9–9	Jun 2012	Maribor Open, Slovenia	Clay	(Germany) Kathrin Wörle	(Denmark) Karen Barbat (Germany) Anna-Lena Friedsam	6–2, 2–6, [10–5]
Loss	9–10	Jul 2012	Reinert Open, Germany	Clay	(Hungary) Réka Luca Jani	(Argentina) Mailen Auroux (Argentina) María Irigoyen	1–6, 4–6
Loss	9–11	Jul 2012	Open Romania Ladies	Clay	(Romania) Raluca Olaru	(Romania) Irina-Camelia Begu (France) Alizé Cornet	2–6, 0–6
Win	10–11	Aug 2012	Empire Slovak Open, Slovakia	Clay	(Czech Republic) Renata Voráčová	(Poland) Marta Domachowska (Austria) Sandra Klemenschits	7–6^{(2)}, 6–4
Win	11–11	Sep 2012	ITF Mamaia, Romania (2)	Clay	(Romania) Raluca Olaru	(Montenegro) Danka Kovinić (Slovenia) Tadeja Majerič	7–6^{(4)}, 6–3
Win	12–11	Oct 2012	ITF Brasília, Brazil	Clay	(Romania) Raluca Olaru	(Switzerland) Timea Bacsinszky (United States) Julia Cohen	6–3, 3–6, [10–8]
Win	13–11	Nov 2012	ITF Buenos Aires, Argentina	Clay	(Romania) Raluca Olaru	(Bolivia) María Fernanda Álvarez Terán (Brazil) Maria Fernanda Alves	1–6, 6–2, [10–7]
Loss	13–12	May 2013	ITF Caserta, Italy	Clay	(Romania) Cristina Dinu	(Montenegro) Danka Kovinic (Czech Republic) Renata Voráčová	4–6, 6–7^{(7)}
Loss	13–13	Jul 2013	Bella Cup Toruń, Poland	Clay	(Ukraine) Yuliya Beygelzimer	(Poland) Paula Kania (Poland) Magda Linette	2–6, 6–4, [5–10]
Win	14–13	Aug 2013	ITF Bad Saulgau, Germany	Clay	(Romania) Laura-Ioana Andrei	(Czech Republic) Barbora Krejčíková (Czech Republic) Kateřina Siniaková	6–7^{(11)}, 6–4, [10–8]
Win	15–13	Aug 2014	Ladies Open Hechingen, Germany	Clay	(Russia) Valeria Solovyeva	(Germany) Carolin Daniels (Germany) Antonia Lottner	6–3, 6–1
Loss	15–14	Aug 2016	ITF Bucharest, Romania	Clay	(Romania) Camelia Hristea	(Romania) Andreea Roșca (Romania) Gabriela Tătăruș	7–6^{(9)}, 2–6, [7–10]
Loss	15–15	Sep 2016	ITF Hódmezővásárhely, Hungary	Clay	(Romania) Irina Bara	(Switzerland) Conny Perrin (Slovakia) Chantal Škamlová	4–6, 2–6
Win	16–15	Oct 2016	Challenger de Saguenay, Canada	Hard (i)	(Romania) Mihaela Buzărnescu	(Canada) Bianca Andreescu (Canada) Charlotte Robillard-Millette	6–4, 6–7^{(4)}, [10–6]
Win	17–15	Nov 2016	ITF Solarino, Italy	Carpet	(Poland) Justyna Jegiołka	(Italy) Veronica Napolitano (Italy) Miriana Tona	4–6, 6–3, [10–7]
Loss	17–16	Feb 2017	ITF Sharm El Sheikh, Egypt	Hard	(Romania) Miriam Bianca Bulgaru	(Belgium) Britt Geukens (Belgium) Magali Kempen	3–6, 6–2, [7–10]
Loss	17–17	Jun 2017	ITF Bucharest, Romania	Clay	(Romania) Miriam Bianca Bulgaru	(Romania) Cristina Ene (Moldova) Alexandra Perper	6–4, 3–6, [4–10]
Loss	17–18	Aug 2017	ITF Bucharest, Romania	Clay	(Romania) Elena-Teodora Cadar	(Romania) Oana Georgeta Simion (Romania) Gabriela Talabă	3–6, 6–2, [10–12]
Win	18–18	Sep 2017	ITF Székesfehérvár, Hungary	Clay	(Romania) Laura-Ioana Andrei	(Hungary) Réka Luca Jani (Hungary) Panna Udvardy	1–6, 6–2, [10–7]
Win	19–18	Oct 2017	ITF Pula, Italy	Clay	(Russia) Valeriya Solovyeva	(Croatia) Tereza Mrdeža (Japan) Akiko Omae	7–6^{(7)}, 5–7, [11–9]
Loss	19–19	Oct 2017	ITF Pula, Italy	Clay	(Bosnia and Herzegovina) Anita Husarić	(Romania) Cristina Dinu (Italy) Camilla Rosatello	2–6, 1–6
Win	20–19	Feb 2018	ITF Antalya, Turkey	Hard	(Romania) Cristina Ene	(Japan) Haruna Arakawa (South Korea) Kim Da-bin	6–4, 6–3
Loss	20–20	Sep 2018	Zagreb Ladies Open, Croatia	Clay	(Romania) Alexandra Cadanțu	(Venezuela) Andrea Gamiz (Venezuela) Aymet Uzcátegui	3–6, 4–6
Win	21–20	Feb 2019	Trnava Indoor, Slovakia	Hard (i)	(Bulgaria) Elitsa Kostova	(Slovakia) Michaela Honcová (Ukraine) Ganna Poznikhirenko	7–5, 7–6^{(5)}
Loss	21–21	May 2019	ITF Caserta, Italy	Clay	(Slovakia) Vivien Juhászová	(Australia) Lizette Cabrera (Austria) Julia Grabher	3–6, 4–6
Loss	21–22	Jun 2019	Internazionale di Roma, Italy	Clay	(Brazil) Carolina Alves	(Italy) Elisabetta Cocciaretto (Romania) Nicoleta Dascălu	5–7, 6–4, [7–10]
Win	22–22	Jul 2019	ITF Biella, Italy	Clay	(Hungary) Réka Luca Jani	(Japan) Chihiro Muramatsu (Japan) Yuki Naito	6–1, 6–3
Loss	22–23	Oct 2019	Kiskút Open, Hungary	Clay (i)	(Uzbekistan) Akgul Amanmuradova	(Romania) Irina Bara (Belgium) Maryna Zanevska	6–3, 2–6, [8–10]
