= BCR Open Romania Ladies =

Defunct tennis tournament
- Location: Bucharest, Romania
- Venue: Arenele BNR
- Category: ITF Women's Circuit
- Surface: Clay (Outdoor)
- Draw: 32S/32Q/16D
- Prize money: $100,000+H
- Website: bcropen.ro

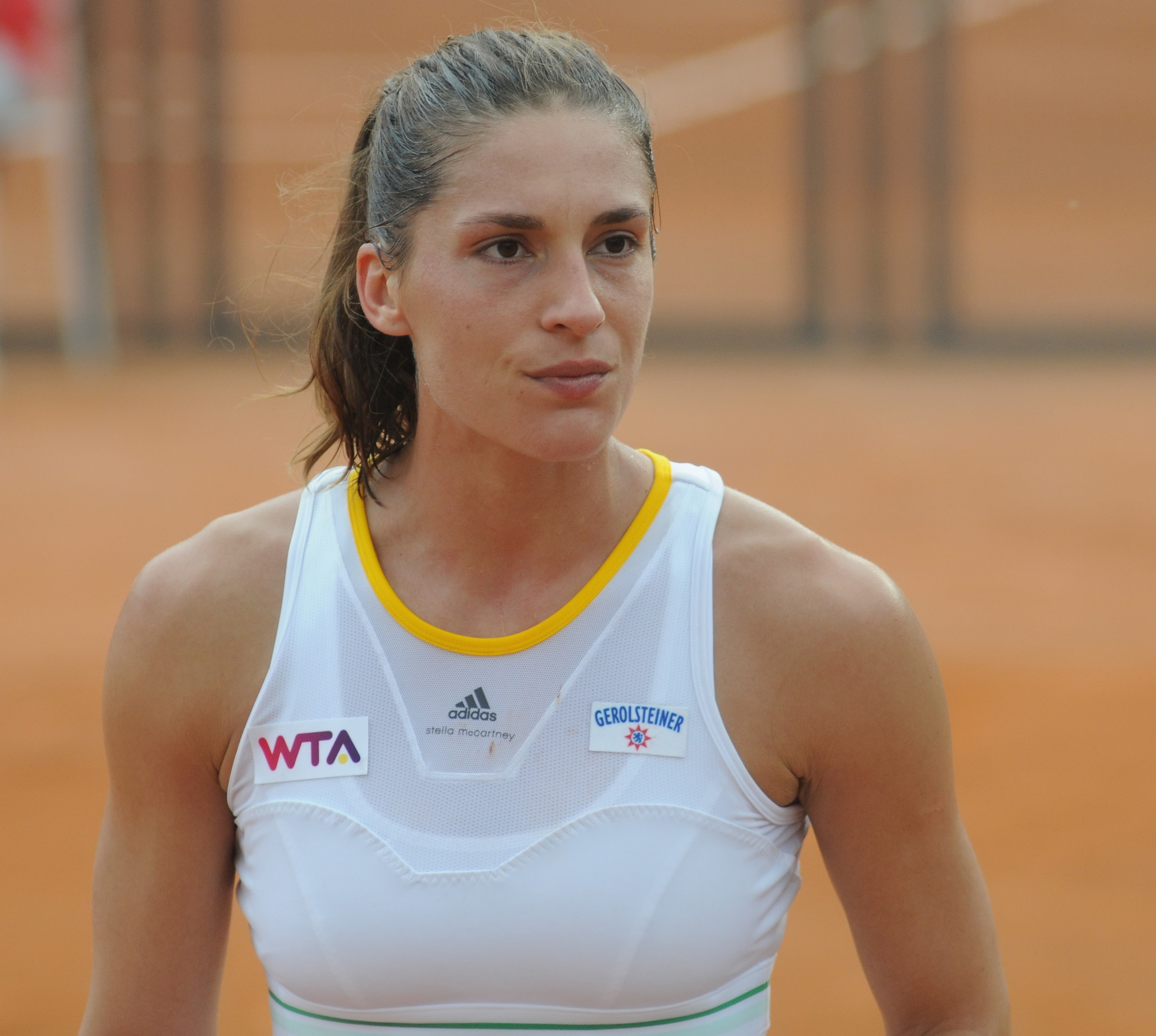
Andrea Petkovic won the tournament once (in 2009)

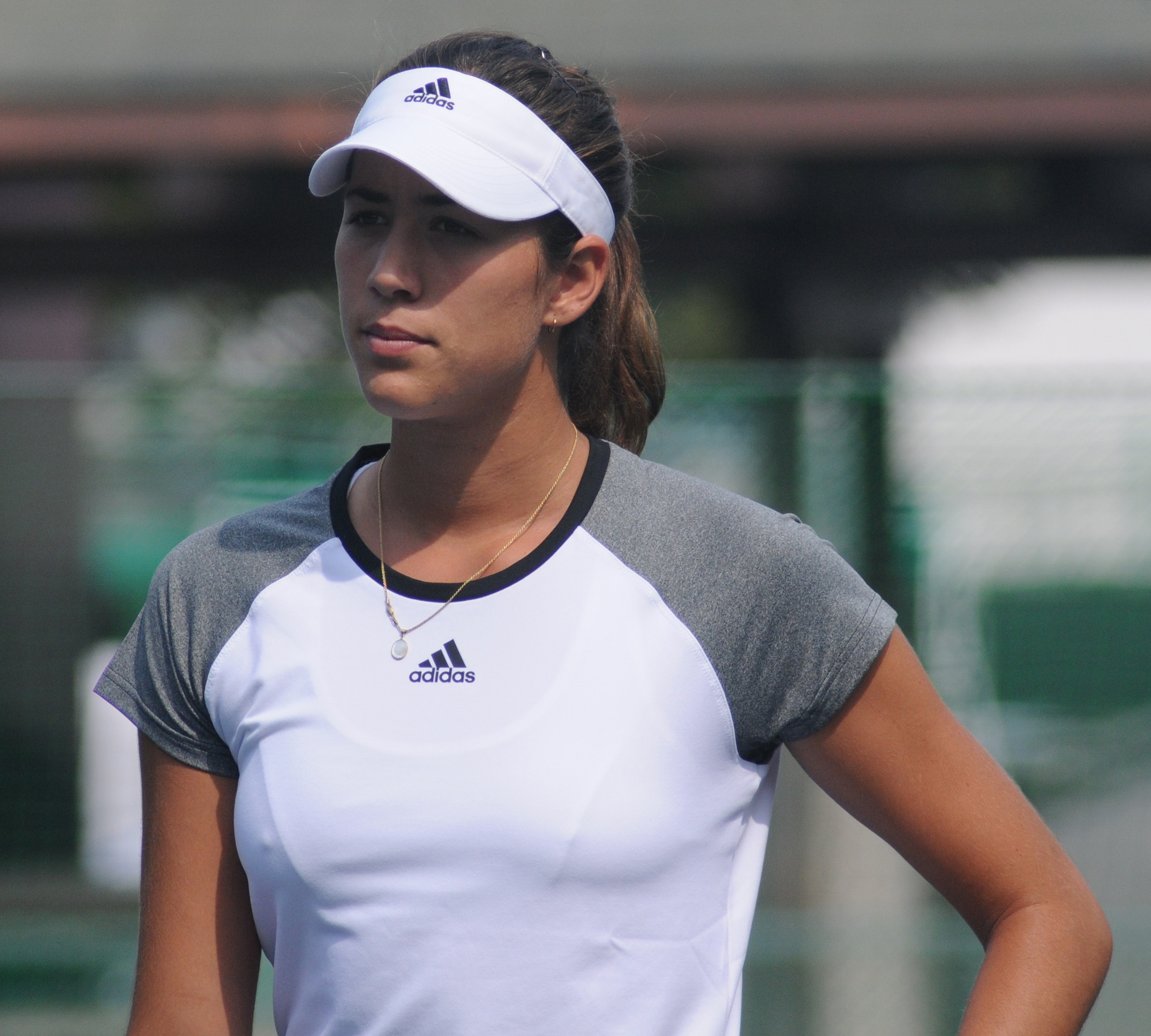
Garbiñe Muguruza was the 2012 singles runner-up

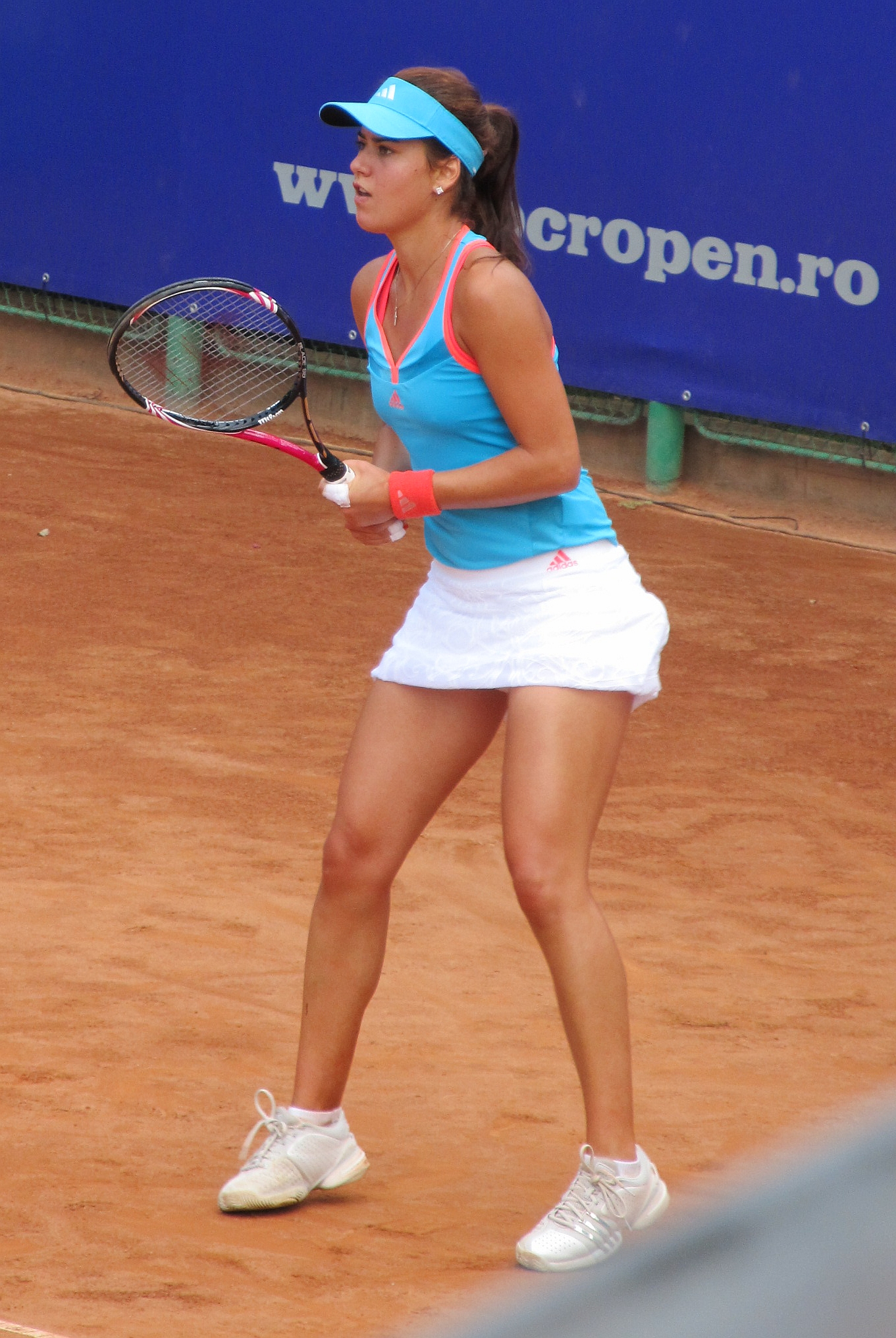
Sorana Cîrstea won in 2007 the first edition of the event, and would play the final once again the following year

The BCR Open Romania Ladies was a tennis tournament held in Bucharest, the capital of Romania. This ITF Circuit event was a $100,000+H tournament. It started off being a $25,000 back in 2007 but has slowly increased the prize money and was played on outdoor clay courts.

== Previous names ==
- 2007–2008: Gaz de France Stars Bucharest
- 2009: GDF Suez Open Romania
- 2010: Ruxandra Dragomir Open

== Past finals ==
=== Singles ===
Year	Champion	Runner-up	Score
2012	(Spain) María-Teresa Torró-Flor	(Spain) Garbiñe Muguruza	6–3, 4–6, 6–4
2011	(Romania) Irina-Camelia Begu	(Spain) Laura Pous Tió	6–3, 7–5
2010	(Australia) Jelena Dokić	(Czech Republic) Zuzana Ondrášková	3–6, 6–1, 7–6^{(7–3)}
2009	(Germany) Andrea Petkovic	(Switzerland) Stefanie Vögele	6–3, 6–2
2008	(Czech Republic) Petra Cetkovská	(Romania) Sorana Cîrstea	7–6^{(7–5)}, 7–6^{(7–3)}
2007	(Romania) Sorana Cîrstea	(Romania) Alexandra Dulgheru	6–4, 6–3

=== Doubles ===
Year	Champions	Runners-up	Score
2012	(Romania) Irina-Camelia Begu (France) Alizé Cornet	(Romania) Elena Bogdan (Romania) Raluca Olaru	6–2, 6–0
2011	(Romania) Irina-Camelia Begu (Romania) Elena Bogdan	(Italy) Maria Elena Camerin (Turkey) İpek Şenoğlu	6–7^{(1–7)}, 7–6^{(7–4)}, [16–14]
2010	(Romania) Irina-Camelia Begu (Romania) Elena Bogdan	(Argentina) María Irigoyen (Argentina) Florencia Molinero	6–1, 6–1
2009	(Romania) Irina-Camelia Begu (Romania) Simona Halep	(Germany) Julia Görges (Austria) Sandra Klemenschits	2–6, 6–0, [12–10]
2008	(Czech Republic) Petra Cetkovská (Czech Republic) Hana Šromová	(Romania) Sorana Cîrstea (Romania) Ágnes Szatmári	6–4, 7–5
2007	(Romania) Sorana Cîrstea (Romania) Ágnes Szatmári	(Romania) Mihaela Buzărnescu (Romania) Monica Niculescu	walkover

== See also ==
- List of tennis tournaments
