= Laura Pous Tió =

Spanish tennis player (born 1984)

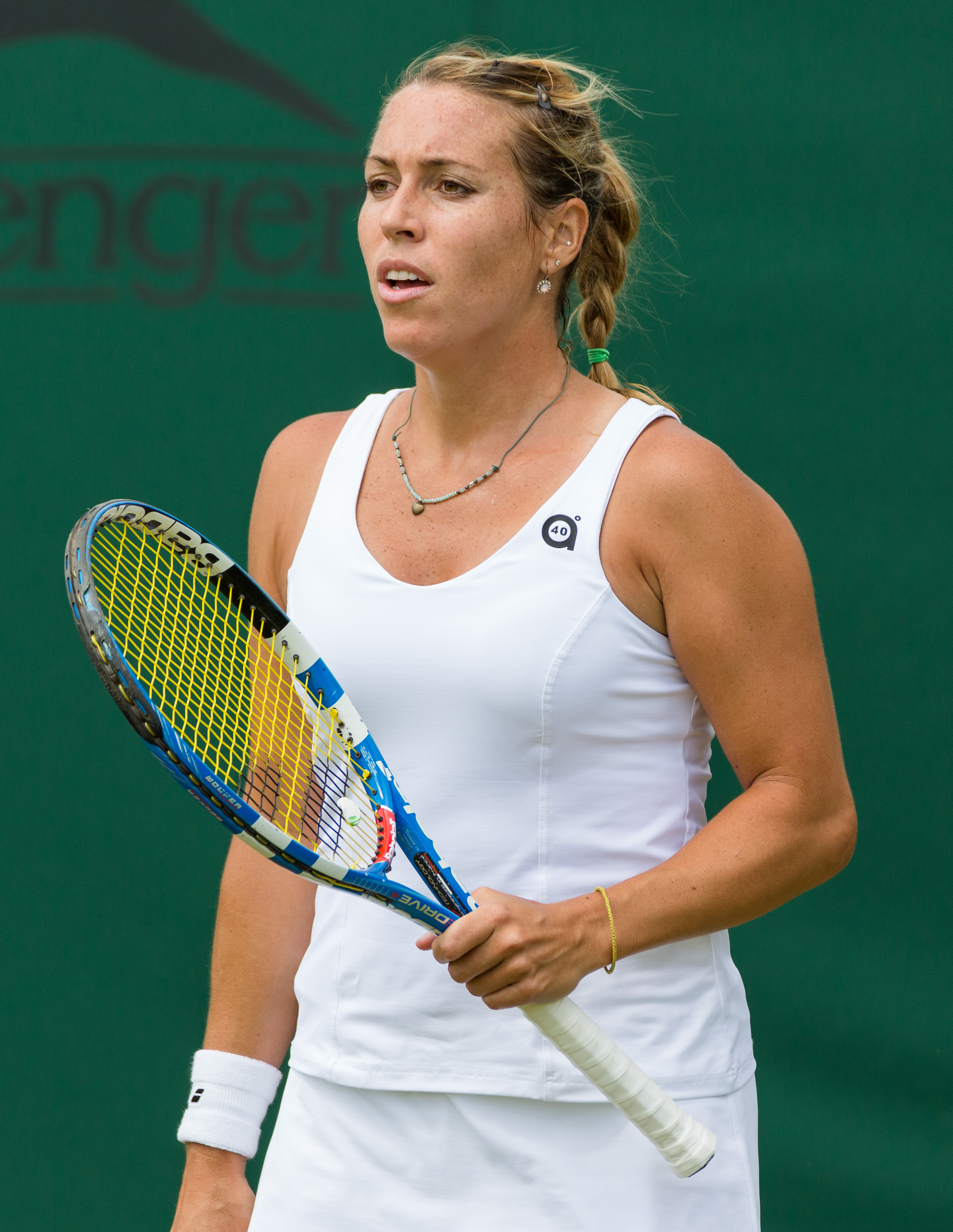
- Pous Tió at the 2015 Wimbledon Championships
- Country (sports): Spain
- Residence: Granollers, Spain
- Born: 1 October 1984 (age 41) Granollers
- Height: 1.73 m (5 ft 8 in)
- Turned pro: 2003
- Plays: Right (two-handed backhand)
- Prize money: $827,965

Singles
- Career record: 435–264
- Career titles: 20 ITF
- Highest ranking: No. 72 (30 January 2012)

Grand Slam singles results
- Australian Open: 1R (2006, 2007, 2011)
- French Open: 1R (2006, 2011, 2012)
- Wimbledon: 1R (2006, 2011, 2012)
- US Open: 2R (2011)

Doubles
- Career record: 123–130
- Career titles: 9 ITF
- Highest ranking: No. 112 (25 July 2011)
Medal record
Mediterranean Games
| Gold medal – first place | 2005 Almería | Women's singles |
| Gold medal – first place | 2009 Almería | Women's doubles |
| Gold medal – first place | 2009 Pescara | Women's doubles |
| Silver medal – second place | 2009 Pescara | Women's singles |

Laura Pous Tió (born 1 October 1984) is a former professional tennis player from Spain.

== Career ==
Pous Tió won the gold medal at the 2005 Mediterranean Games in Almería by defeating compatriot Nuria Llagostera Vives in straight sets. She won a total of 20 singles and nine doubles ITF titles. At the WTA Tour-level, she was a singles runner-up at the Morocco Open in Fés, losing the final in straight sets to Kiki Bertens. In 2007, she played a doubles match for the Spanish Fed Cup team against Russia. Pous Tió reached her career-high singles ranking of No. 72 on 30 January 2012.

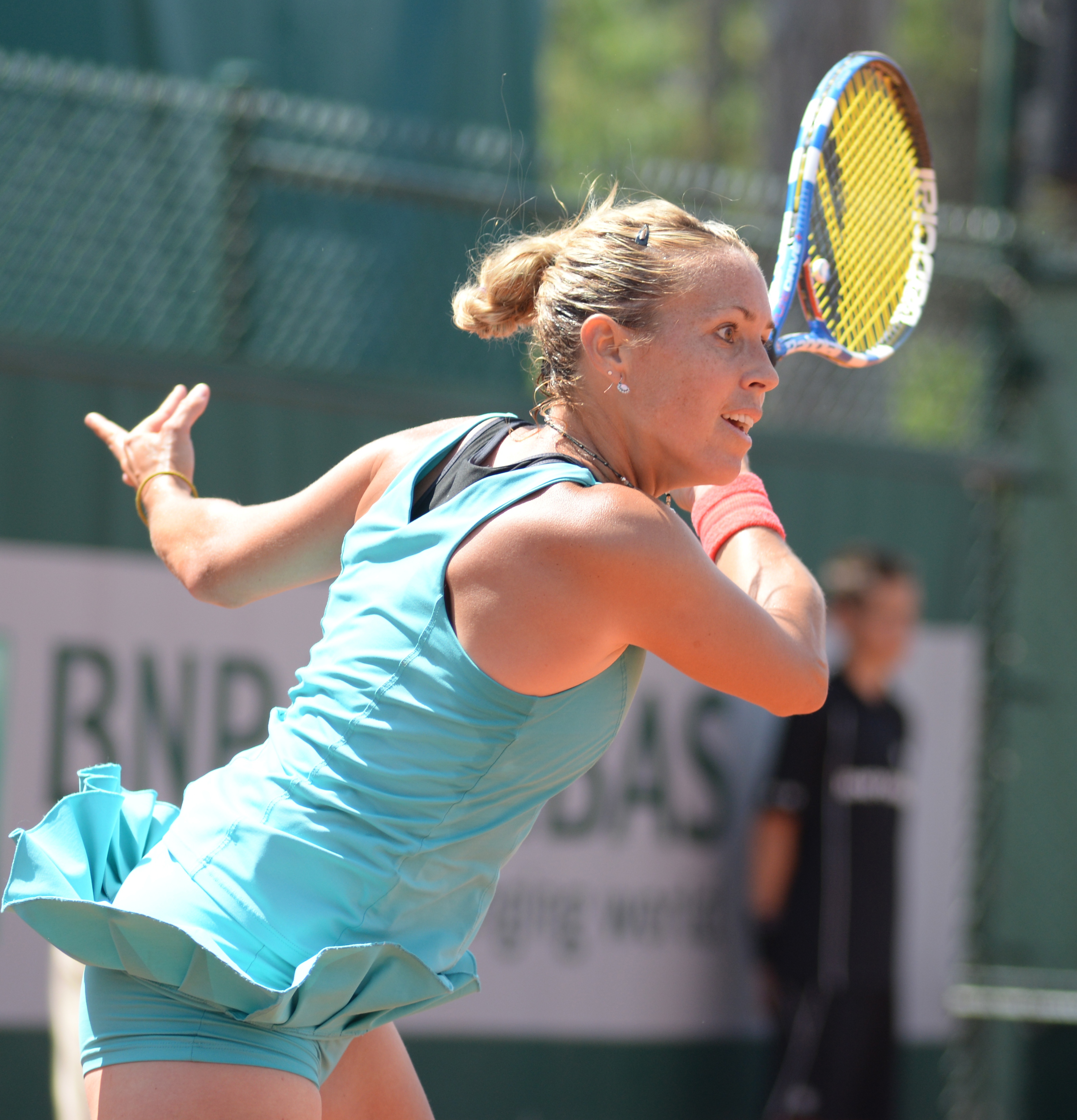
Laura Pous Tió in 2015

Pous Tió served a two-year ban from 2007 to 2009 for an anti-doping rule violation after testing positive for banned diuretics at the 2007 Wimbledon qualifiers. The ban, imposed by the ITF, was upheld by the Court of Arbitration for Sport despite her claim of unintentional use.

== WTA Tour finals ==
=== Singles: 1 (runner-up) ===
| Legend Grand Slam tournaments Premier M & Premier 5 Premier (0–0) International (0–1) | Finals by surface Hard (0–0) Grass (0–0) Clay (0–1) Carpet (0–0) |

| Result | Date | Tournament | Surface | Opponent | Score |
|---|---|---|---|---|---|
| Loss | Apr 2012 | Morocco Open, Fez | Clay | (Netherlands) Kiki Bertens | 5–7, 0–6 |

=== Doubles: 1 (runner-up) ===
| Legend Grand Slam tournaments Premier M & Premier 5 Premier (0–0) International (0–1) | Finals by surface Hard (0–0) Grass (0–0) Clay (0–1) Carpet (0–0) |

| Result | Date | Tournament | Surface | Partner | Opponents | Score |
|---|---|---|---|---|---|---|
| Loss | Feb 2011 | Copa Colsanitas, Colombia | Clay | (Canada) Sharon Fichman | (Romania) Edina Gallovits-Hall (Spain) Anabel Medina Garrigues | 6–2, 6–7^{(6)}, [9–11] |

== Grand Slam performance timelines ==
Key
| W | F | SF | QF | #R | RR | Q# | DNQ | A | NH |

(W) winner; (F) finalist; (SF) semifinalist; (QF) quarterfinalist; (#R) rounds 4, 3, 2, 1; (RR) round-robin stage; (Q#) qualification round; (DNQ) did not qualify; (A) absent; (NH) not held; (SR) strike rate (events won / competed); (W–L) win–loss record.

=== Singles ===
| Tournament | 2004 | 2005 | 2006 | 2007 | 2008 | 2009 | 2010 | 2011 | 2012 | 2013 | 2014 | 2015 | 2016 | W–L |
|---|---|---|---|---|---|---|---|---|---|---|---|---|---|---|
| Australian Open | A | Q1 | 1R | 1R | A | A | A | 1R | 1R | A | A | A | Q1 | 0–4 |
| French Open | A | Q2 | 1R | Q3 | A | A | Q1 | 1R | 1R | A | A | Q3 | Q1 | 0–3 |
| Wimbledon | A | Q2 | 1R | Q1 | A | A | Q1 | 1R | 1R | A | A | Q1 | A | 0–3 |
| US Open | Q3 | 1R | Q3 | A | A | A | Q1 | 2R | Q1 | A | A | Q2 | A | 1–2 |
| Win–loss | 0–0 | 0–1 | 0–3 | 0–1 | 0–0 | 0–0 | 0–0 | 1–4 | 0–3 | 0–0 | 0–0 | 0–0 | 0–0 | 1–12 |

=== Doubles ===
| Tournament | 2005 | 2006 | 2011 | W–L |
|---|---|---|---|---|
| Australian Open | A | 1R | A | 0–1 |
| French Open | A | A | 2R | 1–1 |
| Wimbledon | LQ | A | 1R | 0–1 |
| US Open | 1R | A | 1R | 0–2 |
| Win–loss | 0–1 | 0–1 | 1–3 | 1–5 |

== ITF finals ==
=== Singles: 31 (20–11) ===
| Legend $100,000 tournaments $75,000 tournaments $50,000 tournaments $25,000 tournaments $10,000 tournaments | Finals by surface Hard (2–3) Clay (18–8) |

| Result | W–L | Date | Tournament | Tier | Surface | Opponent | Score |
|---|---|---|---|---|---|---|---|
| Loss | 0–1 | 6 July 2003 | ITF Camargo, Spain | 10,000 | Clay | (Spain) Sabina Mediano-Alvarez | 6–3, 3–6, 1–6 |
| Win | 1–1 | 26 October 2003 | ITF Seville, Spain | 10,000 | Clay | (Spain) Adriana González Peñas | 6–2, 3–6, 6–3 |
| Win | 2–1 | 15 February 2004 | ITF Mallorca, Spain | 10,000 | Clay | (Serbia) Ana Timotić | 4–6, 6–3, 6–0 |
| Win | 3–1 | 28 February 2004 | ITF Gran Canaria, Spain | 10,000 | Clay | (Spain) Núria Roig | 5–7, 6–2, 7–6^{(3)} |
| Loss | 3–2 | 18 April 2004 | Open de Biarritz, France | 25,000 | Clay | (Morocco) Bahia Mouhtassine | 4–6, 6–7^{(4)} |
| Loss | 3–3 | 1 May 2004 | ITF Coatzacoalcos, Mexico | 25,000 | Hard | (United States) Jessica Kirkland | 0–6, 4–6 |
| Win | 4–3 | 24 October 2004 | ITF Seville, Spain | 25,000 | Clay | (Hungary) Kira Nagy | 7–5, 6–1 |
| Win | 5–3 | 21 November 2004 | ITF Barcelona, Spain | 25,000 | Clay | (Bulgaria) Tsvetana Pironkova | 4–6, 7–5, 6–2 |
| Win | 6–3 | 1 May 2005 | Open de Cagnes-sur-Mer, France | 75,000 | Clay | (Russia) Ekaterina Bychkova | 7–6^{(4)}, 6–4 |
| Win | 7–3 | 10 July 2005 | ITF Cuneo, Italy | 50,000 | Clay | (Spain) Conchita Martínez Granados | 6–3, 6–2 |
| Loss | 7–4 | 17 May 2009 | ITF Ain Sukhna, Egypt | 10,000 | Clay | (Russia) Galina Fokina | 6–7^{(2)}, 5–7 |
| Win | 8–4 | 24 May 2009 | ITF Ain Sukhna, Egypt | 10,000 | Clay | (Czech Republic) Zuzana Linhová | 6–1, 6–2 |
| Loss | 8–5 | 15 November 2009 | ITF Mallorca, Spain | 10,000 | Clay | (Italy) Martina di Giuseppe | 3–6, 3–6 |
| Win | 9–5 | 13 December 2009 | ITF Benicarló, Spain | 10,000 | Clay | (Spain) Leticia Costas | 6–1, 6–1 |
| Loss | 9–6 | 6 June 2010 | Maribor Open, Slovenia | 50,000 | Clay | (China) Zhang Shuai | 3–6, 6–3, 3–6 |
| Win | 10–6 | 25 September 2010 | ITF Foggia, Italy | 25,000 | Clay | (Spain) María Teresa Torró Flor | 3–6, 6–3, 6–4 |
| Loss | 10–7 | 3 October 2010 | ITF Athens, Greece | 50,000 | Hard | (Greece) Eleni Daniilidou | 4–6, 1–6 |
| Loss | 10–8 | Feb 2011 | Copa Bionaire, Colombia | 100,000 | Clay | (Romania) Irina-Camelia Begu | 3–6, 6–7^{(1)} |
| Loss | 10–9 | Jul 2011 | Bucharest Ladies Open, Romania | 100,000 | Clay | (Romania) Irina-Camelia Begu | 3–6, 5–7 |
| Win | 11–9 | 11 November 2012 | ITF Benicarló, Spain | 25,000 | Clay | (Germany) Dinah Pfizenmaier | 6–4, 6–1 |
| Win | 12–9 | 24 May 2013 | ITF Casablanca, Morocco | 25,000 | Clay | (Poland) Sandra Zaniewska | 6–3, 6–0 |
| Loss | 12–10 | 26 January 2014 | ITF Tinajo, Spain | 10,000 | Hard | (Italy) Claudia Giovine | 3–6, 6–0, 2–6 |
| Win | 13–10 | 2 February 2014 | ITF Tinajo, Spain | 10,000 | Hard | (South Africa) Natasha Fourouclas | 6–0, 6–3 |
| Win | 14–10 | 9 February 2014 | ITF Tinajo, Spain | 10,000 | Hard | (Italy) Anna Remondina | 6–3, 3–6, 6–2 |
| Win | 15–10 | 13 July 2014 | ITF Getxo, Spain | 10,000 | Clay | (Spain) Olga Sáez Larra | 6–7^{(4)}, 6–3, 7–5 |
| Win | 16–10 | 27 July 2014 | ITF Valladolid, Spain | 10,000 | Clay | (France) Océane Dodin | 4–6, 7–5, 6–2 |
| Win | 17–10 | 2 August 2014 | ITF Rovereto, Italy | 10,000 | Clay | (Switzerland) Lisa Sabino | 6–2, 4–6, 6–1 |
| Win | 18–10 | 9 August 2014 | ITF Vienna, Austria | 10,000 | Clay | (Czech Republic) Gabriela Pantucková | 6–7^{(6)}, 6–3, 6–1 |
| Win | 19–10 | 28 September 2014 | ITF Juárez, Mexico | 25,000 | Clay | (Spain) Lourdes Domínguez Lino | 6–4, 6–1 |
| Win | 20–10 | 14 February 2015 | ITF São Paulo, Brazil | 25,000 | Clay | (Romania) Andreea Mitu | 6–2, 6–2 |
| Loss | 20–11 | 2 July 2016 | ITF Rome, Italy | 50,000 | Clay | (Spain) Sílvia Soler Espinosa | 6–2, 4–6, 5–7 |

=== Doubles: 14 (9–5) ===
| Result | No. | Date | Tournament | Surface | Partner | Opponents | Score |
|---|---|---|---|---|---|---|---|
| Loss | 1. | 14 February 2004 | ITF Mallorca, Spain | Clay | (Spain) Lourdes Domínguez Lino | (Serbia and Montenegro) Ana Timotić (Spain) Rosa María Andrés Rodríguez | 6–3, 4–6, 4–6 |
| Loss | 2. | 30 April 2004 | ITF Coatzacoalcos, Mexico | Hard | (Spain) Lourdes Domínguez Lino | (Argentina) Soledad Esperón (Argentina) Flavia Mignola | 0–6, 1–6 |
| Win | 1. | 23 October 2004 | ITF Seville, Spain | Clay | (Spain) Lourdes Domínguez Lino | (Hungary) Kira Nagy (Hungary) Virág Németh | 6–2, 6–3 |
| Win | 2. | 20 November 2004 | ITF Barcelona, Spain | Clay | (Spain) Lourdes Domínguez Lino | (Russia) Nina Bratchikova (Russia) Ekaterina Kozhokina | 6–2, 6–3 |
| Win | 3. | 30 June 2007 | ITF Getxo, Spain | Clay | (Spain) Nuria Llagostera Vives | (Spain) Conchita Martínez Granados (Argentina) María Emilia Salerni | 6–2, 6–1 |
| Win | 4. | 16 May 2009 | ITF Ain Sukhna, Egypt | Clay | (Egypt) Yasmin Ebada | (Russia) Galina Fokina (Russia) Anna Morgina | 6–4, 2–6, [10–5] |
| Win | 5. | 14 November 2009 | ITF Mallorca, Spain | Clay | (Switzerland) Romina Oprandi | (Spain) Leticia Costas (Spain) Inés Ferrer Suárez | 7–6^{(5)}, 6–2 |
| Win | 6. | 11 December 2009 | ITF Benicarló, Spain | Clay | (Switzerland) Romina Oprandi | (Romania) Alexandra Cadanțu (Romania) Diana Enache | 6–4, 6–3 |
| Loss | 3. | 12 February 2010 | Copa Bionaire, Colombia | Clay | (Spain) Estrella Cabeza Candela | (Romania) Edina Gallovits-Hall (Slovenia) Polona Hercog | 6–3, 3–6, [8–10] |
| Loss | 4. | 24 September 2010 | ITF Foggia, Italy | Clay | (Spain) Estrella Cabeza Candela | (Argentina) María Irigoyen (Argentina) Florencia Molinero | 2–6, 2–6 |
| Loss | 5. | 23 October 2010 | Open Saint-Raphaël, France | Hard (i) | (Spain) Estrella Cabeza Candela | (Austria) Sandra Klemenschits (Germany) Tatjana Maria | 2–6, 4–6 |
| Win | 7. | 10 July 2015 | Bursa Cup, Turkey | Clay | (Russia) Marina Melnikova | (Georgia (country)) Sofia Shapatava (Ukraine) Anastasiya Vasylyeva | 6–4, 6–4 |
| Win | 8. | 11 June 2016 | Bredeney Ladies Open, Germany | Clay | (Germany) Anne Schäfer | (Belgium) Elyne Boeykens (Romania) Elena-Gabriela Ruse | 6–2, 6–3 |
| Win | 9. | 10 July 2016 | Contrexéville Open, France | Clay | (Netherlands) Cindy Burger | (United States) Nicole Melichar (Czech Republic) Renata Voráčová | 6–1, 6–3 |
