= 2011 ITF Women's Circuit (January–March) =

Tennis tournaments

The 2011 ITF Women's Circuit is the 2011 edition of the second-tier tour for women's professional tennis. It is organised by the International Tennis Federation and is a tier below the WTA Tour. During the months of January 2011 and March 2011 over 50 tournaments were played.

== Key ==
$100,000 tournaments
$75,000 tournaments
$50,000 tournaments
$25,000 tournaments
$10,000 tournaments

== January ==
Week of	Tournament	Winner	Runners-up	Semifinalists	Quarterfinalists
January 3	2011 Blossom Cup; Quanzhou, China; Hard $50,000; Singles draw – Doubles draw	(China) Lu Jingjing; 3–6, 7–6^{(7–2)}, 6–3	(France) Stéphanie Foretz Gacon	(China) Sun Shengnan (Chinese Taipei) Chan Chin-wei	(Ukraine) Tetiana Luzhanska (Japan) Chiaki Okadaue (Serbia) Doroteja Erić (France) Julie Coin
January 3	2011 Blossom Cup; Quanzhou, China; Hard $50,000; Singles draw – Doubles draw	(China) Liu Wanting (China) Sun Shengnan; 6–3, 6–2	(Ukraine) Yulia Beygelzimer (Georgia (country)) Oksana Kalashnikova	(China) Sun Shengnan (Chinese Taipei) Chan Chin-wei	(Ukraine) Tetiana Luzhanska (Japan) Chiaki Okadaue (Serbia) Doroteja Erić (France) Julie Coin
January 3	Saint-Martin; Hard $10,000; Singles draw – Doubles draw	(France) Céline Cattaneo; 6–7^{(7–9)}, 6–4, 7–6^{(8–6)}	(Switzerland) Lara Michel	(United States) Gail Brodsky (United States) Amanda McDowell	(France) Irina Ramialison (France) Laurence Combes (Austria) Christine Kandler (United States) Samantha Powers
January 3	Saint-Martin; Hard $10,000; Singles draw – Doubles draw	(United States) Elizabeth Lumpkin (Norway) Nina Munch-Søgaard; 3–6, 6–4, [10–3]	(France) Céline Cattaneo (Switzerland) Lara Michel	(United States) Gail Brodsky (United States) Amanda McDowell	(France) Irina Ramialison (France) Laurence Combes (Austria) Christine Kandler (United States) Samantha Powers
January 10	Pingguo, China; Hard $25,000; Singles draw – Doubles draw	(China) Lu Jingjing; 6–4, 7–5	(Ukraine) Tetiana Luzhanska	(China) Liu Chang (China) Lu Jiajing	(China) Liang Chen (China) Zheng Saisai (China) Sun Shengnan (United Kingdom) Tara Moore
January 10	Pingguo, China; Hard $25,000; Singles draw – Doubles draw	(Japan) Shuko Aoyama (Japan) Rika Fujiwara; 6–4, 6–3	(China) Liu Wanting (China) Sun Shengnan	(China) Liu Chang (China) Lu Jiajing	(China) Liang Chen (China) Zheng Saisai (China) Sun Shengnan (United Kingdom) Tara Moore
January 10	Plantation Open; Plantation, Florida, United States; Clay $25,000; Singles draw – Doubles draw	(Canada) Sharon Fichman; 6–3, 7–6^{(7–2)}	(Romania) Alexandra Cadanţu	(Slovakia) Lenka Wienerová (Italy) Camila Giorgi	(United States) Julia Boserup (United States) Shelby Rogers (Austria) Melanie Klaffner (Russia) Valeria Solovyeva
January 10	Plantation Open; Plantation, Florida, United States; Clay $25,000; Singles draw – Doubles draw	(United States) Ahsha Rolle (United States) Mashona Washington; 6–4, 6–2	(United States) Christina Fusano (United States) Yasmin Schnack	(Slovakia) Lenka Wienerová (Italy) Camila Giorgi	(United States) Julia Boserup (United States) Shelby Rogers (Austria) Melanie Klaffner (Russia) Valeria Solovyeva
January 10	Gosier, Guadeloupe; Hard $10,000; Singles draw – Doubles draw	(United States) Gail Brodsky; 6–3, 2–6, 6–2	(United States) Sachia Vickery	(United States) Amanda McDowell (France) Marion Gaud	(South Africa) Surina de Beer (France) Clothilde de Bernardi (France) Virginie Ayassamy (France) Céline Cattaneo
January 10	Gosier, Guadeloupe; Hard $10,000; Singles draw – Doubles draw	(United States) Amanda McDowell (Norway) Nina Munch-Søgaard; 6–0, 7–5	(France) Amandine Cazeaux (France) Irina Ramialison	(United States) Amanda McDowell (France) Marion Gaud	(South Africa) Surina de Beer (France) Clothilde de Bernardi (France) Virginie Ayassamy (France) Céline Cattaneo
January 10	Glasgow, United Kingdom; Hard $10,000; Singles draw – Doubles draw	(Croatia) Jasmina Tinjić; 6–2, 6–2	(United Kingdom) Naomi Broady	(United Kingdom) Anna Fitzpatrick (United Kingdom) Lisa Whybourn	(United Kingdom) Daneika Borthwick (Serbia) Teodora Mirčić (Norway) Ulrikke Eikeri (Germany) Kim Grajdek
January 10	Glasgow, United Kingdom; Hard $10,000; Singles draw – Doubles draw	(Norway) Ulrikke Eikeri (Bulgaria) Isabella Shinikova; 6–4, 6–4	(Serbia) Teodora Mirčić (Croatia) Jasmina Tinjić	(United Kingdom) Anna Fitzpatrick (United Kingdom) Lisa Whybourn	(United Kingdom) Daneika Borthwick (Serbia) Teodora Mirčić (Norway) Ulrikke Eikeri (Germany) Kim Grajdek
January 17	Muzaffarnagar, India; Grass $25,000; Singles draw – Doubles draw	(Slovenia) Tadeja Majerič; 6–2, 5–7, 6–2	(China) Zheng Saisai	(Kyrgyzstan) Ksenia Palkina (Serbia) Doroteja Erić	(Japan) Miki Miyamura (United Kingdom) Emily Webley-Smith (Slovenia) Dalila Jakupović (Japan) Sakiko Shimizu
January 17	Muzaffarnagar, India; Grass $25,000; Singles draw – Doubles draw	(India) Rushmi Chakravarthi (India) Poojashree Venkatesha; 3–6, 6–4, [14–12]	(Japan) Miki Miyamura (Japan) Mari Tanaka	(Kyrgyzstan) Ksenia Palkina (Serbia) Doroteja Erić	(Japan) Miki Miyamura (United Kingdom) Emily Webley-Smith (Slovenia) Dalila Jakupović (Japan) Sakiko Shimizu
January 17	Lutz, Florida, United States; Clay $25,000; Singles draw – Doubles draw	(Germany) Laura Siegemund; 6–7^{(4–7)}, 6–1, 6–2	(United States) Jessica Pegula	(Italy) Camila Giorgi (Russia) Valeria Solovyeva	(United States) Jennifer Elie (Croatia) Jelena Pandžić (United States) Ahsha Rolle (Canada) Sharon Fichman
January 17	Lutz, Florida, United States; Clay $25,000; Singles draw – Doubles draw	(United States) Ahsha Rolle (United States) Mashona Washington; 6–4, 6–4	(Canada) Gabriela Dabrowski (Canada) Sharon Fichman	(Italy) Camila Giorgi (Russia) Valeria Solovyeva	(United States) Jennifer Elie (Croatia) Jelena Pandžić (United States) Ahsha Rolle (Canada) Sharon Fichman
January 17	Andrézieux-Bouthéon, France; Hard $25,000; Singles draw – Doubles draw	(Germany) Mona Barthel; 6–3, 3–6, 6–4	(Liechtenstein) Stephanie Vogt	(Austria) Nikola Hofmanova (Germany) Annika Beck	(Russia) Valeria Savinykh (France) Claire Feuerstein (Georgia (country)) Margalita Chakhnashvili (Croatia) Ivana Lisjak
January 17	Andrézieux-Bouthéon, France; Hard $25,000; Singles draw – Doubles draw	(Croatia) Darija Jurak (Russia) Valeria Savinykh; 6–3, 7–6^{(7–0)}	(Netherlands) Kiki Bertens (Netherlands) Richèl Hogenkamp	(Austria) Nikola Hofmanova (Germany) Annika Beck	(Russia) Valeria Savinykh (France) Claire Feuerstein (Georgia (country)) Margalita Chakhnashvili (Croatia) Ivana Lisjak
January 17	Tallinn, Estonia; Hard $10,000; Singles draw – Doubles draw	(Slovakia) Michaela Hončová; 6–0, 6–4	(Austria) Katharina Negrin	(Slovakia) Zuzana Luknárová (Russia) Polina Vinogradova	(Norway) Emma Flood (Latvia) Diāna Marcinkēviča (Estonia) Anett Kontaveit (Russia) Yana Buchina
January 17	Tallinn, Estonia; Hard $10,000; Singles draw – Doubles draw	(Poland) Veronika Domagała (Poland) Natalia Kołat; 6–1, 6–0	(Russia) Yanina Darishina (Russia) Polina Rodionova	(Slovakia) Zuzana Luknárová (Russia) Polina Vinogradova	(Norway) Emma Flood (Latvia) Diāna Marcinkēviča (Estonia) Anett Kontaveit (Russia) Yana Buchina
January 17	Stuttgart, Germany; Hard $10,000; Singles draw – Doubles draw	(Slovakia) Jana Čepelová; 6–4, 6–4	(Germany) Nina Zander	(Slovakia) Michaela Pochabová (Germany) Korina Perkovic	(Czech Republic) Tereza Hladíková (Germany) Tanja Ostertag (Switzerland) Viktorija Golubic (Germany) Jasmin Kling
January 17	Stuttgart, Germany; Hard $10,000; Singles draw – Doubles draw	(Netherlands) Daniëlle Harmsen (Russia) Marina Melnikova; 3–6, 6–4, [14–12]	(Slovakia) Jana Čepelová (Slovakia) Michaela Pochabová	(Slovakia) Michaela Pochabová (Germany) Korina Perkovic	(Czech Republic) Tereza Hladíková (Germany) Tanja Ostertag (Switzerland) Viktorija Golubic (Germany) Jasmin Kling
January 17	Wrexham, United Kingdom; Hard $10,000; Singles draw – Doubles draw	(United Kingdom) Anna Fitzpatrick; 6–7^{(3–7)}, 6–3, 7–5	(United Kingdom) Jade Windley	(France) Elixane Lechemia (United Kingdom) Lisa Whybourn	(United Kingdom) Lucy Brown (Czech Republic) Petra Krejsová (Republic of Ireland) Amy Bowtell (United Kingdom) Jocelyn Rae
January 17	Wrexham, United Kingdom; Hard $10,000; Singles draw – Doubles draw	(United Kingdom) Anna Fitzpatrick (United Kingdom) Jade Windley; 6–1, 6–0	(Norway) Ulrikke Eikeri (United Kingdom) Nicole George	(France) Elixane Lechemia (United Kingdom) Lisa Whybourn	(United Kingdom) Lucy Brown (Czech Republic) Petra Krejsová (Republic of Ireland) Amy Bowtell (United Kingdom) Jocelyn Rae
January 24	Grenoble, France; Hard $25,000; Singles draw – Doubles draw	(Poland) Marta Domachowska; 6–4, 6–4	(United Kingdom) Naomi Broady	(Liechtenstein) Stephanie Vogt (France) Stéphanie Foretz Gacon	(France) Irena Pavlovic (Italy) Giulia Gatto-Monticone (Belarus) Iryna Kuryanovich (Georgia (country)) Margalita Chakhnashvili
January 24	Grenoble, France; Hard $25,000; Singles draw – Doubles draw	(France) Stéphanie Cohen-Aloro (Tunisia) Selima Sfar; 6–1, 6–3	(Belarus) Iryna Kuryanovich (France) Aurélie Védy	(Liechtenstein) Stephanie Vogt (France) Stéphanie Foretz Gacon	(France) Irena Pavlovic (Italy) Giulia Gatto-Monticone (Belarus) Iryna Kuryanovich (Georgia (country)) Margalita Chakhnashvili
January 24	Tallinn, Estonia; Hard $10,000; Singles draw – Doubles draw	(Estonia) Anett Kontaveit; 6–4, 4–6, 6–2	(Slovakia) Zuzana Luknárová	(Estonia) Margit Rüütel (Russia) Yanina Darishina	(Russia) Daria Mironova (Russia) Polina Vinogradova (Poland) Natalia Kołat (Russia) Polina Rodionova
January 24	Tallinn, Estonia; Hard $10,000; Singles draw – Doubles draw	(Serbia) Tamara Čurović (Ukraine) Yevgeniya Kyrvoruchko; 7–6^{(10–8)}, 6–1	(Estonia) Maret Ani (Estonia) Anett Kontaveit	(Estonia) Margit Rüütel (Russia) Yanina Darishina	(Russia) Daria Mironova (Russia) Polina Vinogradova (Poland) Natalia Kołat (Russia) Polina Rodionova
January 24	Kolkata, India; Clay $10,000; Singles draw – Doubles draw	(Japan) Mari Tanaka; 6–4, 6–3	(Slovenia) Dalila Jakupović	(Chinese Taipei) Lee Hua-chen (India) Poojashree Venkatesha	(Slovenia) Anja Prislan (India) Sharmada Balu (India) Sheethal Goutham (Japan) Yumi Miyazaki
January 24	Kolkata, India; Clay $10,000; Singles draw – Doubles draw	(Italy) Nicole Clerico (Slovenia) Dalila Jakupović; 6–3, 6–1	(India) Ankita Raina (India) Poojashree Venkatesha	(Chinese Taipei) Lee Hua-chen (India) Poojashree Venkatesha	(Slovenia) Anja Prislan (India) Sharmada Balu (India) Sheethal Goutham (Japan) Yumi Miyazaki
January 24	Kaarst, Germany; Carpet $10,000; Singles draw – Doubles draw	(Germany) Sarah Gronert; 6–7^{(4–7)}, 7–6^{(7–5)}, 6–3	(Germany) Anna Zaja	(Czech Republic) Tereza Hladíková (Germany) Korina Perkovic	(Czech Republic) Tereza Martincová (Germany) Julia Kimmelmann (Poland) Paula Kania (Switzerland) Amra Sadiković
January 24	Kaarst, Germany; Carpet $10,000; Singles draw – Doubles draw	(Czech Republic) Nikola Fraňková (Czech Republic) Tereza Hladíková; 3–6, 7–6^{(7–1)}, [10–8]	(Poland) Paula Kania (Russia) Marina Melnikova	(Czech Republic) Tereza Hladíková (Germany) Korina Perkovic	(Czech Republic) Tereza Martincová (Germany) Julia Kimmelmann (Poland) Paula Kania (Switzerland) Amra Sadiković
January 24	Bucaramanga, Colombia; Clay $10,000; Singles draw – Doubles draw	(Bulgaria) Aleksandrina Naydenova; 6–1, 6–2	(Colombia) Yuliana Lizarazo	(Colombia) Catalina Castaño (Slovakia) Zuzana Zlochová	(Peru) Ingrid Várgas Calvo (Brazil) Nathalia Rossi (Brazil) Vivian Segnini (United States) Libby Muma
January 24	Bucaramanga, Colombia; Clay $10,000; Singles draw – Doubles draw	(Colombia) Catalina Castaño (Colombia) Viky Núñez Fuentes; 7–6^{(7–3)}, 6–1	(Brazil) Nathalia Rossi (Slovakia) Zuzana Zlochová	(Colombia) Catalina Castaño (Slovakia) Zuzana Zlochová	(Peru) Ingrid Várgas Calvo (Brazil) Nathalia Rossi (Brazil) Vivian Segnini (United States) Libby Muma
January 31	Rabat, Morocco; Clay $25,000; Singles draw – Doubles draw	(Russia) Nina Bratchikova; 3–6, 6–4, 6–1	(Portugal) Maria João Koehler	(Spain) Lara Arruabarrena (Italy) Karin Knapp	(Russia) Anastasia Mukhametova (Italy) Anna Floris (France) Laura Thorpe (Russia) Marina Shamayko
January 31	Rabat, Morocco; Clay $25,000; Singles draw – Doubles draw	(Czech Republic) Eva Hrdinová (Italy) Karin Knapp; 6–4, 6–1	(Czech Republic) Iveta Gerlová (Czech Republic) Lucie Kriegsmannová	(Spain) Lara Arruabarrena (Italy) Karin Knapp	(Russia) Anastasia Mukhametova (Italy) Anna Floris (France) Laura Thorpe (Russia) Marina Shamayko
January 31	2011 McDonald's Burnie International; Burnie, Australia; Hard $25,000; Singles – Doubles	(Canada) Eugenie Bouchard; 6–4, 6–3	(China) Zheng Saisai	(Slovenia) Nastja Kolar (Australia) Karolina Wlodarczak	(Russia) Daria Gavrilova (Australia) Olivia Rogowska (United Kingdom) Emily Webley-Smith (Russia) Yulia Putintseva
January 31	2011 McDonald's Burnie International; Burnie, Australia; Hard $25,000; Singles – Doubles	(Japan) Natsumi Hamamura (Japan) Erika Takao; 6–2, 3–6, [10–7]	(Australia) Sally Peers (Australia) Olivia Rogowska	(Slovenia) Nastja Kolar (Australia) Karolina Wlodarczak	(Russia) Daria Gavrilova (Australia) Olivia Rogowska (United Kingdom) Emily Webley-Smith (Russia) Yulia Putintseva
January 31	Rancho Santa Fe, California, United States; Hard $25,000; Singles draw – Doubles draw	(Portugal) Michelle Larcher de Brito; 3–6, 6–4, 6–1	(United States) Madison Brengle	(United States) Krista Hardebeck (Slovakia) Lenka Wienerová	(United States) Julia Cohen (Ukraine) Tetiana Luzhanska (United States) Alexa Glatch (United States) Nicole Gibbs
January 31	Rancho Santa Fe, California, United States; Hard $25,000; Singles draw – Doubles draw	(United States) Julie Ditty (Bosnia and Herzegovina) Mervana Jugić-Salkić; 6–0, 6–2	(Japan) Shuko Aoyama (Japan) Remi Tezuka	(United States) Krista Hardebeck (Slovakia) Lenka Wienerová	(United States) Julia Cohen (Ukraine) Tetiana Luzhanska (United States) Alexa Glatch (United States) Nicole Gibbs
January 31	Mallorca, Spain; Clay $10,000; Singles draw – Doubles draw	(Georgia (country)) Ekaterine Gorgodze; 6–4, 6–2	(Ukraine) Sofiya Kovalets	(Italy) Claudia Giovine (Russia) Viktoria Kamenskaya	(Spain) Alejandra Sala Juste (Georgia (country)) Sofia Kvatsabaia (Bulgaria) Martina Gledacheva (Italy) Agnese Zucchini
January 31	Mallorca, Spain; Clay $10,000; Singles draw – Doubles draw	(Spain) Yera Campos Molina (Spain) Alejandra Sala Juste; 7–6^{(7–5)}, 6–4	(Czech Republic) Jana Jandová (Czech Republic) Vivien Juhászová	(Italy) Claudia Giovine (Russia) Viktoria Kamenskaya	(Spain) Alejandra Sala Juste (Georgia (country)) Sofia Kvatsabaia (Bulgaria) Martina Gledacheva (Italy) Agnese Zucchini
January 31	Coimbra, Portugal; Hard $10,000; Singles draw – Doubles draw	(Spain) Rocío de la Torre Sánchez; 7–5, 4–0 ret.	(Germany) Kim Grajdek	(France) Morgane Pons (Germany) Jasmin Steinherr	(Italy) Martina Caciotti (Italy) Alice Savoretti (Republic of Ireland) Amy Bowtell (Argentina) Veronica Saucedo
January 31	Coimbra, Portugal; Hard $10,000; Singles draw – Doubles draw	(Germany) Kim Grajdek (Poland) Barbara Sobaszkiewicz; 7–6^{(7–1)}, 6–3	(Norway) Ulrikke Eikeri (Spain) Arabela Fernández Rabener	(France) Morgane Pons (Germany) Jasmin Steinherr	(Italy) Martina Caciotti (Italy) Alice Savoretti (Republic of Ireland) Amy Bowtell (Argentina) Veronica Saucedo
January 31	Sutton, United Kingdom; Hard $25,000; Singles draw – Doubles draw	(France) Kristina Mladenovic; 6–3, 1–6, 6–2	(Germany) Mona Barthel	(Poland) Marta Domachowska (France) Irena Pavlovic	(Belarus) Iryna Kuryanovich (Netherlands) Elise Tamaëla (Poland) Katarzyna Piter (United Kingdom) Naomi Broady
January 31	Sutton, United Kingdom; Hard $25,000; Singles draw – Doubles draw	(Finland) Emma Laine (United Kingdom) Melanie South; 6–3, 5–7, [10–8]	(Poland) Marta Domachowska (Croatia) Darija Jurak	(Poland) Marta Domachowska (France) Irena Pavlovic	(Belarus) Iryna Kuryanovich (Netherlands) Elise Tamaëla (Poland) Katarzyna Piter (United Kingdom) Naomi Broady

== February ==
Week of	Tournament	Winner	Runners-up	Semifinalists	Quarterfinalists
February 7	2011 Copa Bionaire; Cali, Colombia; Clay $100,000; Singles – Doubles	(Romania) Irina-Camelia Begu; 6–3, 7–6^{(7–1)}	(Spain) Laura Pous Tió	(Germany) Kathrin Wörle (Russia) Alexandra Panova	(Czech Republic) Eva Birnerová (Austria) Patricia Mayr-Achleitner (France) Mathilde Johansson (Russia) Ekaterina Ivanova
February 7	2011 Copa Bionaire; Cali, Colombia; Clay $100,000; Singles – Doubles	(Romania) Irina-Camelia Begu (Romania) Elena Bogdan; 2–6, 7–6^{(8–6)}, [11–9]	(Russia) Ekaterina Ivanova (Germany) Kathrin Wörle	(Germany) Kathrin Wörle (Russia) Alexandra Panova	(Czech Republic) Eva Birnerová (Austria) Patricia Mayr-Achleitner (France) Mathilde Johansson (Russia) Ekaterina Ivanova
February 7	2011 Dow Corning Tennis Classic; Midland, Michigan, United States; Hard $100,000; Singles – Doubles	(Czech Republic) Lucie Hradecká; 6–4, 6–4	(United States) Irina Falconi	(Russia) Ksenia Pervak (Canada) Rebecca Marino	(Germany) Sabine Lisicki (United States) Ahsha Rolle (United States) Madison Brengle (United States) Alexandra Stevenson
February 7	2011 Dow Corning Tennis Classic; Midland, Michigan, United States; Hard $100,000; Singles – Doubles	(United States) Jamie Hampton (Georgia (country)) Anna Tatishvili w/o	(United States) Irina Falconi (United States) Alison Riske	(Russia) Ksenia Pervak (Canada) Rebecca Marino	(Germany) Sabine Lisicki (United States) Ahsha Rolle (United States) Madison Brengle (United States) Alexandra Stevenson
February 7	Rancho Mirage, California, United States; Hard $25,000; Singles draw – Doubles draw	(United States) Ashley Weinhold; 6–3, 3–6, 7–5	(Czech Republic) Kristýna Plíšková	(Czech Republic) Karolína Plíšková (United States) Lauren Albanese	(South Africa) Chanel Simmonds (Ukraine) Tetiana Luzhanska (Slovakia) Lenka Wienerová (Japan) Shuko Aoyama
February 7	Rancho Mirage, California, United States; Hard $25,000; Singles draw – Doubles draw	(Czech Republic) Karolína Plíšková (Czech Republic) Kristýna Plíšková; 6–7^{(6–8)}, 6–1, [10–5]	(Russia) Nadejda Guskova (Poland) Sandra Zaniewska	(Czech Republic) Karolína Plíšková (United States) Lauren Albanese	(South Africa) Chanel Simmonds (Ukraine) Tetiana Luzhanska (Slovakia) Lenka Wienerová (Japan) Shuko Aoyama
February 7	Antalya, Turkey; Clay $10,000; Singles draw – Doubles draw	(Italy) Carolina Pillot; 7–5, 6–0	(Sweden) Beatrice Cedermark	(Morocco) Nadia Lalami (Turkey) Melis Sezer	(Slovenia) Anja Prislan (Russia) Anna Arina Marenko (Morocco) Fatima El Allami (Russia) Marina Shamayko
February 7	Antalya, Turkey; Clay $10,000; Singles draw – Doubles draw	(Russia) Margarita Lazareva (Russia) Ekaterina Yashina; 6–4, 6–4	(Turkey) Sultan Gönen (Ukraine) Anna Karavayeva	(Morocco) Nadia Lalami (Turkey) Melis Sezer	(Slovenia) Anja Prislan (Russia) Anna Arina Marenko (Morocco) Fatima El Allami (Russia) Marina Shamayko
February 7	Mallorca, Spain; Clay $10,000; Singles draw – Doubles draw	(Spain) Lara Arruabarrena; 6–1, 6–2	(Switzerland) Conny Perrin	(Ukraine) Sofiya Kovalets (Georgia (country)) Ekaterine Gorgodze	(Hungary) Réka-Luca Jani (Netherlands) Daniëlle Harmsen (Italy) Paola Cigui (Venezuela) Andrea Gámiz
February 7	Mallorca, Spain; Clay $10,000; Singles draw – Doubles draw	(Netherlands) Daniëlle Harmsen (Germany) Scarlett Werner; 6–4, 6–3	(Hungary) Réka-Luca Jani (Switzerland) Conny Perrin	(Ukraine) Sofiya Kovalets (Georgia (country)) Ekaterine Gorgodze	(Hungary) Réka-Luca Jani (Netherlands) Daniëlle Harmsen (Italy) Paola Cigui (Venezuela) Andrea Gámiz
February 7	Stockholm, Sweden; Hard $25,000; Singles draw – Doubles draw	(France) Kristina Mladenovic; 6–3, 6–4	(Netherlands) Arantxa Rus	(Germany) Annika Beck (Slovakia) Michaela Hončová	(Luxembourg) Anne Kremer (Poland) Katarzyna Piter (United Kingdom) Naomi Broady (Ukraine) Yulia Beygelzimer
February 7	Stockholm, Sweden; Hard $25,000; Singles draw – Doubles draw	(Netherlands) Arantxa Rus (Belarus) Anastasiya Yakimova; 6–3, 2–6, [10–8]	(France) Claire Feuerstein (Russia) Ksenia Lykina	(Germany) Annika Beck (Slovakia) Michaela Hončová	(Luxembourg) Anne Kremer (Poland) Katarzyna Piter (United Kingdom) Naomi Broady (Ukraine) Yulia Beygelzimer
February 7	Vale do Lobo, Portugal; Hard $10,000; Singles draw – Doubles draw	(Belgium) Alison Van Uytvanck; 6–4, 4–6, 6–2	(Bulgaria) Elitsa Kostova	(France) Amandine Hesse (Poland) Justyna Jegiołka	(United Kingdom) Jocelyn Rae (Russia) Natalia Orlova (Spain) Lucía Cervera Vázquez (Norway) Ulrikke Eikeri
February 7	Vale do Lobo, Portugal; Hard $10,000; Singles draw – Doubles draw	(Spain) Rocío de la Torre Sánchez (Spain) Olga Sáez Larra w/o	(Norway) Ulrikke Eikeri (United Kingdom) Anna Fitzpatrick	(France) Amandine Hesse (Poland) Justyna Jegiołka	(United Kingdom) Jocelyn Rae (Russia) Natalia Orlova (Spain) Lucía Cervera Vázquez (Norway) Ulrikke Eikeri
February 7	Buenos Aires, Argentina; Clay $10,000; Singles draw – Doubles draw	(Argentina) Catalina Pella; 6–4, 2–6, 6–3	(Argentina) Mailen Auroux	(Chile) Andrea Koch Benvenuto (Paraguay) Verónica Cepede Royg	(Austria) Yvonne Neuwirth (Argentina) Florencia di Biasi (Israel) Deniz Khazaniuk (Argentina) Andrea Benítez
February 7	Buenos Aires, Argentina; Clay $10,000; Singles draw – Doubles draw	(Paraguay) Verónica Cepede Royg (Argentina) Luciana Sarmenti; 6–0, 6–3	(Chile) Fernanda Brito (Argentina) Catalina Pella	(Chile) Andrea Koch Benvenuto (Paraguay) Verónica Cepede Royg	(Austria) Yvonne Neuwirth (Argentina) Florencia di Biasi (Israel) Deniz Khazaniuk (Argentina) Andrea Benítez
February 14	Surprise, Arizona, United States; Hard $25,000; Singles draw – Doubles draw	(Puerto Rico) Monica Puig; 6–4, 6–0	(Slovakia) Lenka Wienerová	(South Africa) Chanel Simmonds (United States) Chiara Scholl	(Slovakia) Michaela Pochabová (Ukraine) Tetiana Luzhanska (Russia) Nadejda Guskova (Russia) Olga Puchkova
February 14	Surprise, Arizona, United States; Hard $25,000; Singles draw – Doubles draw	(Japan) Shuko Aoyama (Japan) Remi Tezuka; 6–3, 6–1	(Bosnia and Herzegovina) Mervana Jugić-Salkić (Ukraine) Tetiana Luzhanska	(South Africa) Chanel Simmonds (United States) Chiara Scholl	(Slovakia) Michaela Pochabová (Ukraine) Tetiana Luzhanska (Russia) Nadejda Guskova (Russia) Olga Puchkova
February 14	Mallorca, Spain; Clay $25,000; Singles draw – Doubles draw	(Belarus) Iryna Kuryanovich; 6–2, 6–3	(Ukraine) Sofiya Kovalets	(Italy) Anna Floris (Portugal) Maria João Koehler	(Bulgaria) Elitsa Kostova (Spain) Estrella Cabeza Candela (Romania) Cristina Dinu (Slovakia) Lenka Juríková
February 14	Mallorca, Spain; Clay $25,000; Singles draw – Doubles draw	(Ukraine) Irina Buryachok (Belarus) Iryna Kuryanovich; 7–5, 6–2	(Czech Republic) Iveta Gerlová (Czech Republic) Lucie Kriegsmannová	(Italy) Anna Floris (Portugal) Maria João Koehler	(Bulgaria) Elitsa Kostova (Spain) Estrella Cabeza Candela (Romania) Cristina Dinu (Slovakia) Lenka Juríková
February 14	Antalya, Turkey; Clay $10,000; Singles draw – Doubles draw	(Germany) Christina Shakovets; 6–4, 6–1	(Serbia) Teodora Mirčić	(Russia) Aminat Kushkhova (Canada) Carol Zhao	(Italy) Carolina Pillot (France) Emilie Bacquet (Sweden) Beatrice Cedermark (Russia) Marina Shamayko
February 14	Antalya, Turkey; Clay $10,000; Singles draw – Doubles draw	(Russia) Irina Glimakova (Russia) Polina Monova; 6–3, 6–3	(Romania) Patricia Chirea (Italy) Valentina Sulpizio	(Russia) Aminat Kushkhova (Canada) Carol Zhao	(Italy) Carolina Pillot (France) Emilie Bacquet (Sweden) Beatrice Cedermark (Russia) Marina Shamayko
February 14	Leimen, Germany; Hard $10,000; Singles draw – Doubles draw	(Italy) Gioia Barbieri; 6–4, 6–2	(Germany) Korina Perkovic	(Serbia) Doroteja Erić (Uzbekistan) Albina Khabibulina	(Germany) Sarah Gronert (France) Myrtille Georges (Latvia) Diāna Marcinkēviča (Germany) Katharina Lehnert
February 14	Leimen, Germany; Hard $10,000; Singles draw – Doubles draw	(Czech Republic) Martina Borecká (Czech Republic) Petra Krejsová; 2–6, 7–6^{(7–5)}, [10–4]	(Netherlands) Kim Kilsdonk (Netherlands) Nicolette van Uitert	(Serbia) Doroteja Erić (Uzbekistan) Albina Khabibulina	(Germany) Sarah Gronert (France) Myrtille Georges (Latvia) Diāna Marcinkēviča (Germany) Katharina Lehnert
February 14	Albufeira, Portugal; Hard $10,000; Singles draw – Doubles draw	(Netherlands) Lesley Kerkhove; 3–6, 7–5, 6–2	(Switzerland) Amra Sadiković	(Italy) Alice Balducci (Slovakia) Zuzana Luknárová	(France) Alice Tisset (Spain) Lucía Cervera Vázquez (France) Constance Sibille (Croatia) Ani Mijačika
February 14	Albufeira, Portugal; Hard $10,000; Singles draw – Doubles draw	All doubles matches cancelled due to rain.		(Italy) Alice Balducci (Slovakia) Zuzana Luknárová	(France) Alice Tisset (Spain) Lucía Cervera Vázquez (France) Constance Sibille (Croatia) Ani Mijačika
February 14	Aurangabad, India; Clay $10,000; Singles draw – Doubles draw	(Uzbekistan) Vlada Ekshibarova; 6–1, 6–4	(Thailand) Varatchaya Wongteanchai	(India) Sharmada Balu (Italy) Nicole Clerico	(South Korea) Han Sung-hee (Japan) Kanae Hisami (Japan) Ai Yamamoto (Slovenia) Anja Prislan
February 14	Aurangabad, India; Clay $10,000; Singles draw – Doubles draw	(Thailand) Varatchaya Wongteanchai (Thailand) Varunya Wongteanchai; 4–6, 6–2, [10–6]	(Italy) Nicole Clerico (Italy) Maria Masini	(India) Sharmada Balu (Italy) Nicole Clerico	(South Korea) Han Sung-hee (Japan) Kanae Hisami (Japan) Ai Yamamoto (Slovenia) Anja Prislan
February 14	Buenos Aires, Argentina; Clay $10,000; Singles draw – Doubles draw	(Paraguay) Verónica Cepede Royg; 4–1, ret.	(Brazil) Nathalia Rossi	(Argentina) Mailen Auroux (Brazil) Vivian Segnini	(Chile) Cecilia Costa Melgar (Chile) Andrea Koch Benvenuto (Argentina) Vanesa Furlanetto (Argentina) Andrea Benítez
February 14	Buenos Aires, Argentina; Clay $10,000; Singles draw – Doubles draw	(Paraguay) Verónica Cepede Royg (Argentina) Luciana Sarmenti; 5–7, 6–3, [10–7]	(Argentina) Andrea Benítez (Argentina) Tatiana Búa	(Argentina) Mailen Auroux (Brazil) Vivian Segnini	(Chile) Cecilia Costa Melgar (Chile) Andrea Koch Benvenuto (Argentina) Vanesa Furlanetto (Argentina) Andrea Benítez
February 21	Mildura, Australia; Grass $25,000; Singles draw – Doubles draw	(Chinese Taipei) Hsieh Su-wei; 6–1, 6–2	(United Kingdom) Katie O'Brien	(United States) Gail Brodsky (Australia) Isabella Holland	(Australia) Ashleigh Barty (Japan) Shiho Akita (Australia) Daniella Dominikovic (Japan) Rika Fujiwara
February 21	Mildura, Australia; Grass $25,000; Singles draw – Doubles draw	(Australia) Casey Dellacqua (Australia) Olivia Rogowska; 4–6, 7–6^{(8–6)}, [10–4]	(Japan) Rika Fujiwara (Japan) Kumiko Iijima	(United States) Gail Brodsky (Australia) Isabella Holland	(Australia) Ashleigh Barty (Japan) Shiho Akita (Australia) Daniella Dominikovic (Japan) Rika Fujiwara
February 21	Antalya, Turkey; Clay $10,000; Singles draw – Doubles draw	(Bulgaria) Dia Evtimova; 6–3, 6–4	(France) Marion Gaud	(Germany) Anne Schäfer (Ukraine) Nadya Kolb	(China) Liang Chen (Russia) Anna Arina Marenko (France) Gracia Radovanovic (Slovakia) Zuzana Zlochová
February 21	Antalya, Turkey; Clay $10,000; Singles draw – Doubles draw	(China) Liang Chen (China) Tian Ran; 6–7^{(2–7)}, 7–5, [11–9]	(Russia) Olga Panova (Russia) Marina Shamayko	(Germany) Anne Schäfer (Ukraine) Nadya Kolb	(China) Liang Chen (Russia) Anna Arina Marenko (France) Gracia Radovanovic (Slovakia) Zuzana Zlochová
February 21	Zell am Harmersbach, Germany; Carpet $10,000; Singles draw – Doubles draw	(Germany) Nina Zander; 6–7^{(3–7)}, 7–5, 6–1	(Czech Republic) Eva Hrdinová	(Russia) Marina Melnikova (Germany) Sarah Gronert	(Croatia) Darija Jurak (Germany) Julia Kimmelmann (Italy) Gioia Barbieri (Belarus) Polina Pekhova
February 21	Zell am Harmersbach, Germany; Carpet $10,000; Singles draw – Doubles draw	(Netherlands) Kim Kilsdonk (Netherlands) Nicolette van Uitert; 7–5, 6–4	(Belarus) Lidziya Marozava (Belarus) Sviatlana Pirazhenka	(Russia) Marina Melnikova (Germany) Sarah Gronert	(Croatia) Darija Jurak (Germany) Julia Kimmelmann (Italy) Gioia Barbieri (Belarus) Polina Pekhova
February 21	Portimão, Portugal; Hard $10,000; Singles draw – Doubles draw	(Croatia) Ani Mijačika; 6–4, 6–4	(Germany) Justine Ozga	(Bulgaria) Elitsa Kostova (Poland) Justyna Jegiołka	(United States) Sachia Vickery (Spain) Arabela Fernández Rabener (France) Constance Sibille (Spain) Rocío de la Torre Sánchez
February 21	Portimão, Portugal; Hard $10,000; Singles draw – Doubles draw	(Croatia) Ani Mijačika (Switzerland) Amra Sadiković; 6–1, 7–6^{(7–4)}	(Russia) Ksenia Gospodinova (Germany) Dejana Raickovic	(Bulgaria) Elitsa Kostova (Poland) Justyna Jegiołka	(United States) Sachia Vickery (Spain) Arabela Fernández Rabener (France) Constance Sibille (Spain) Rocío de la Torre Sánchez
February 21	Mumbai, India; Hard $10,000; Singles draw – Doubles draw	(Thailand) Varatchaya Wongteanchai; 2–6, 6–4, 6–1	(Uzbekistan) Vlada Ekshibarova	(Singapore) Stefanie Tan (Thailand) Nicha Lertpitaksinchai	(South Korea) Han Na-lae (Italy) Nicole Clerico (China) Liu Shaozhuo (Thailand) Luksika Kumkhum
February 21	Mumbai, India; Hard $10,000; Singles draw – Doubles draw	(Japan) Kanae Hisami (China) Li Ting; 6–1, 7–5	(South Korea) Han Sung-hee (Thailand) Varatchaya Wongteanchai	(Singapore) Stefanie Tan (Thailand) Nicha Lertpitaksinchai	(South Korea) Han Na-lae (Italy) Nicole Clerico (China) Liu Shaozhuo (Thailand) Luksika Kumkhum
February 28	Sydney, Australia; Hard $25,000; Singles draw – Doubles draw	(Japan) Yurika Sema; 6–4, 5–7, 7–6^{(7–2)}	(Japan) Rika Fujiwara	(United Kingdom) Emily Webley-Smith (United States) Gail Brodsky	(Japan) Kumiko Iijima (Australia) Ashleigh Barty (Australia) Shannon Golds (Australia) Daniella Dominikovic
February 28	Sydney, Australia; Hard $25,000; Singles draw – Doubles draw	(Australia) Casey Dellacqua (Australia) Olivia Rogowska; 3–6, 7–6^{(7–3)}, [10–4]	(Japan) Rika Fujiwara (Japan) Kumiko Iijima	(United Kingdom) Emily Webley-Smith (United States) Gail Brodsky	(Japan) Kumiko Iijima (Australia) Ashleigh Barty (Australia) Shannon Golds (Australia) Daniella Dominikovic
February 28	Hammond, Louisiana, United States; Hard $25,000; Singles draw – Doubles draw	(United States) Madison Brengle; 6–3, 6–3	(France) Stéphanie Foretz Gacon	(Russia) Valeria Savinykh (Romania) Elena Bogdan	(Australia) Sophie Ferguson (Israel) Julia Glushko (New Zealand) Marina Erakovic (United States) Irina Falconi
February 28	Hammond, Louisiana, United States; Hard $25,000; Singles draw – Doubles draw	(United States) Julie Ditty (United States) Christina Fusano; 6–3, 6–3	(Bosnia and Herzegovina) Mervana Jugić-Salkić (United Kingdom) Melanie South	(Russia) Valeria Savinykh (Romania) Elena Bogdan	(Australia) Sophie Ferguson (Israel) Julia Glushko (New Zealand) Marina Erakovic (United States) Irina Falconi
February 28	Lyon, France; Hard $10,000; Singles draw – Doubles draw	(Italy) Anna Remondina; 7–6^{(8–6)}, 6–3	(France) Claire Feuerstein	(Russia) Yana Buchina (Croatia) Silvia Njirić	(Germany) Kim Grajdek (Italy) Annalisa Bona (Switzerland) Xenia Knoll (Czech Republic) Petra Krejsová
February 28	Lyon, France; Hard $10,000; Singles draw – Doubles draw	(Croatia) Maria Abramović (Georgia (country)) Sofia Kvatsabaia; 6–4, 3–6, [10–5]	(Czech Republic) Martina Borecká (Czech Republic) Petra Krejsová	(Russia) Yana Buchina (Croatia) Silvia Njirić	(Germany) Kim Grajdek (Italy) Annalisa Bona (Switzerland) Xenia Knoll (Czech Republic) Petra Krejsová
February 28	Antalya, Turkey; Clay $10,000; Singles draw – Doubles draw	(Romania) Cristina Dinu; 6–2, 6–3	(Romania) Diana Enache	(Bulgaria) Dia Evtimova (Russia) Anastasia Mukhametova	(Bulgaria) Martina Gledacheva (Germany) Anne Schäfer (China) Tian Ran (Ukraine) Oksana Lyubtsova
February 28	Antalya, Turkey; Clay $10,000; Singles draw – Doubles draw	(China) Liang Chen (China) Tian Ran; 4–6, 6–2, [10–6]	(Croatia) Darija Jurak (Poland) Katarzyna Kawa	(Bulgaria) Dia Evtimova (Russia) Anastasia Mukhametova	(Bulgaria) Martina Gledacheva (Germany) Anne Schäfer (China) Tian Ran (Ukraine) Oksana Lyubtsova

== March ==
Week of	Tournament	Winner	Runners-up	Semifinalists	Quarterfinalists
March 7	Clearwater, Florida, United States; Hard $25,000; Singles draw – Doubles draw	(Croatia) Ajla Tomljanović; 7–6^{(7–3)}, 6–3	(Kazakhstan) Sesil Karatantcheva	(Russia) Valeria Solovyeva (Portugal) Michelle Larcher de Brito	(Greece) Irini Georgatou (United States) Grace Min (Czech Republic) Karolína Plíšková (Czech Republic) Kristýna Plíšková
March 7	Clearwater, Florida, United States; Hard $25,000; Singles draw – Doubles draw	(United States) Kimberly Couts (Latvia) Līga Dekmeijere; 6–1, 6–4	(Canada) Heidi El Tabakh (Russia) Arina Rodionova	(Russia) Valeria Solovyeva (Portugal) Michelle Larcher de Brito	(Greece) Irini Georgatou (United States) Grace Min (Czech Republic) Karolína Plíšková (Czech Republic) Kristýna Plíšková
March 7	Dijon, France; Hard $10,000; Singles draw – Doubles draw	(Belgium) Alison Van Uytvanck; 6–2, 6–3	(France) Claire Feuerstein	(Netherlands) Angelique van der Meet (Switzerland) Myriam Casanova	(Croatia) Ana Vrljić (France) Estelle Cascino (Italy) Anna Remondina (Czech Republic) Martina Borecká
March 7	Dijon, France; Hard $10,000; Singles draw – Doubles draw	(Czech Republic) Martina Borecká (Czech Republic) Petra Krejsová; 6–3, 6–4	(Croatia) Maria Abramović (Georgia (country)) Sofia Kvatsabaia	(Netherlands) Angelique van der Meet (Switzerland) Myriam Casanova	(Croatia) Ana Vrljić (France) Estelle Cascino (Italy) Anna Remondina (Czech Republic) Martina Borecká
March 7	Antalya, Turkey; Clay $10,000; Singles draw – Doubles draw	(Netherlands) Bibiane Schoofs; 6–0, 4–6, 6–3	(Netherlands) Daniëlle Harmsen	(Romania) Diana Enache (Ukraine) Oksana Lyubtsova	(Romania) Raluca Elena Platon (Bulgaria) Martina Gledacheva (Czech Republic) Martina Kubičíková (Russia) Eugeniya Pashkova
March 7	Antalya, Turkey; Clay $10,000; Singles draw – Doubles draw	(Netherlands) Daniëlle Harmsen (Netherlands) Bibiane Schoofs; 6–3, 7–5	(Russia) Eugeniya Pashkova (Russia) Maria Zharkova	(Romania) Diana Enache (Ukraine) Oksana Lyubtsova	(Romania) Raluca Elena Platon (Bulgaria) Martina Gledacheva (Czech Republic) Martina Kubičíková (Russia) Eugeniya Pashkova
March 7	Madrid, Spain; Clay $10,000; Singles draw – Doubles draw	(Spain) Lara Arruabarrena; 6–4, 6–2	(Spain) Leticia Costas	(Italy) Carolina Pillot (Russia) Nanuli Pipiya	(Romania) Ionela-Andreea Iova (Greece) Despina Papamichail (Spain) Arabela Fernández Rabener (Italy) Evelyn Mayr
March 7	Madrid, Spain; Clay $10,000; Singles draw – Doubles draw	(Italy) Nicole Clerico (Spain) Leticia Costas; 6–0, 6–1	(Italy) Evelyn Mayr (Italy) Julia Mayr	(Italy) Carolina Pillot (Russia) Nanuli Pipiya	(Romania) Ionela-Andreea Iova (Greece) Despina Papamichail (Spain) Arabela Fernández Rabener (Italy) Evelyn Mayr
March 7	Irapuato, Mexico; Hard $25,000; Singles draw – Doubles draw	(New Zealand) Marina Erakovic; 7–5, 6–4	(Slovenia) Andreja Klepač	(Croatia) Ivana Lisjak (Bolivia) María Fernanda Álvarez Terán	(Brazil) Vivian Segnini (United States) Julia Cohen (Argentina) María Irigoyen (France) Kristina Mladenovic
March 7	Irapuato, Mexico; Hard $25,000; Singles draw – Doubles draw	(Hungary) Tímea Babos (Australia) Johanna Konta; 6–3, 6–4	(United States) Macall Harkins (Austria) Nicole Rottmann	(Croatia) Ivana Lisjak (Bolivia) María Fernanda Álvarez Terán	(Brazil) Vivian Segnini (United States) Julia Cohen (Argentina) María Irigoyen (France) Kristina Mladenovic
March 7	Concepción, Chile; Clay $10,000; Singles draw – Doubles draw	(Bulgaria) Aleksandrina Naydenova; 1–6, 6–4, 6–4	(Argentina) Andrea Benítez	(Argentina) Tatiana Búa (Germany) Karolina Nowak	(United States) Alexandra Hirsch (United States) Elizabeth Ferris (Chile) Andrea Koch Benvenuto (Serbia) Nataša Zorić
March 7	Concepción, Chile; Clay $10,000; Singles draw – Doubles draw	(United States) Alexandra Hirsch (United States) Amanda McDowell; 6–4, 5–7, [10–8]	(Argentina) Andrea Benítez (Argentina) Barbara Rush	(Argentina) Tatiana Búa (Germany) Karolina Nowak	(United States) Alexandra Hirsch (United States) Elizabeth Ferris (Chile) Andrea Koch Benvenuto (Serbia) Nataša Zorić
March 14	2011 The Bahamas Women's Open; Nassau, Bahamas; Hard $100,000+H; Singles – Doubles	(Belarus) Anastasiya Yakimova; 6–3, 6–2	(Germany) Angelique Kerber	(Slovakia) Magdaléna Rybáriková (Canada) Rebecca Marino	(Netherlands) Arantxa Rus (Switzerland) Timea Bacsinszky (United Kingdom) Heather Watson (Bulgaria) Tsvetana Pironkova
March 14	2011 The Bahamas Women's Open; Nassau, Bahamas; Hard $100,000+H; Singles – Doubles	(South Africa) Natalie Grandin (Czech Republic) Vladimíra Uhlířová; 6–4, 6–2	(United States) Raquel Kops-Jones (United States) Abigail Spears	(Slovakia) Magdaléna Rybáriková (Canada) Rebecca Marino	(Netherlands) Arantxa Rus (Switzerland) Timea Bacsinszky (United Kingdom) Heather Watson (Bulgaria) Tsvetana Pironkova
March 14	Amiens, France; Clay $10,000; Singles draw – Doubles draw	(Italy) Nastassya Burnett; 2–6, 6–1, 6–4	(Poland) Paula Kania	(Georgia (country)) Sofia Kvatsabaia (Russia) Anna Arina Marenko	(Italy) Alice Savoretti (Croatia) Maria Abramović (France) Estelle Cascino (Czech Republic) Iveta Gerlová
March 14	Amiens, France; Clay $10,000; Singles draw – Doubles draw	(Poland) Paula Kania (Poland) Barbara Sobaszkiewicz; 3–6, 6–4, [10–6]	(Czech Republic) Iveta Gerlová (Czech Republic) Lucie Kriegsmannová	(Georgia (country)) Sofia Kvatsabaia (Russia) Anna Arina Marenko	(Italy) Alice Savoretti (Croatia) Maria Abramović (France) Estelle Cascino (Czech Republic) Iveta Gerlová
March 14	Antalya, Turkey; Clay $10,000; Singles draw – Doubles draw	(Romania) Cristina Dinu; 6–3, 6–4	(Hungary) Réka-Luca Jani	(Bulgaria) Dia Evtimova (Netherlands) Daniëlle Harmsen	(Bulgaria) Martina Gledacheva (Spain) Garbiñe Muguruza (Sweden) Anna Brazhnikova (Poland) Sandra Zaniewska
March 14	Antalya, Turkey; Clay $10,000; Singles draw – Doubles draw	(Turkey) Pemra Özgen (Poland) Sandra Zaniewska; 2–6, 7–5, [10–7]	(Hungary) Réka-Luca Jani (Czech Republic) Martina Kubičíková	(Bulgaria) Dia Evtimova (Netherlands) Daniëlle Harmsen	(Bulgaria) Martina Gledacheva (Spain) Garbiñe Muguruza (Sweden) Anna Brazhnikova (Poland) Sandra Zaniewska
March 14	Madrid, Spain; Clay $10,000; Singles draw – Doubles draw	(Italy) Julia Mayr; 3–6, 6–2, 6–2	(Italy) Giulia Sussarello	(Italy) Benedetta Davato (Spain) Inés Ferrer Suárez	(Romania) Ionela-Andreea Iova (Italy) Agnese Zucchini (Italy) Carolina Pillot (Italy) Federica Quercia
March 14	Madrid, Spain; Clay $10,000; Singles draw – Doubles draw	(Italy) Evelyn Mayr (Italy) Julia Mayr; 6–2, 6–2	(Spain) Lucía Cervera Vázquez (Italy) Benedetta Davato	(Italy) Benedetta Davato (Spain) Inés Ferrer Suárez	(Romania) Ionela-Andreea Iova (Italy) Agnese Zucchini (Italy) Carolina Pillot (Italy) Federica Quercia
March 14	Fällanden, Switzerland; Carpet $10,000; Singles draw – Doubles draw	(Switzerland) Myriam Casanova; 6–3, 6–4	(Latvia) Diāna Marcinkēviča	(France) Céline Cattaneo (Bosnia and Herzegovina) Sandra Martinović	(Switzerland) Xenia Knoll (Germany) Syna Kayser (Switzerland) Belinda Bencic (Switzerland) Amra Sadiković
March 14	Fällanden, Switzerland; Carpet $10,000; Singles draw – Doubles draw	(Switzerland) Xenia Knoll (Switzerland) Amra Sadiković; 6–3, 6–3	(Slovenia) Dalila Jakupović (Slovenia) Anja Prislan	(France) Céline Cattaneo (Bosnia and Herzegovina) Sandra Martinović	(Switzerland) Xenia Knoll (Germany) Syna Kayser (Switzerland) Belinda Bencic (Switzerland) Amra Sadiković
March 14	Bath, United Kingdom; Hard $10,000; Singles draw – Doubles draw	(Russia) Marta Sirotkina w/o	(Italy) Giulia Gatto-Monticone	(United Kingdom) Lucy Brown (Italy) Claudia Giovine	(United Kingdom) Samantha Murray (Estonia) Margit Rüütel (Netherlands) Lesley Kerkhove (France) Elixane Lechemia
March 14	Bath, United Kingdom; Hard $10,000; Singles draw – Doubles draw	(Italy) Giulia Gatto-Monticone (Italy) Anastasia Grymalska; 6–4, 2–6, [10–6]	(Finland) Emma Laine (United Kingdom) Tara Moore	(United Kingdom) Lucy Brown (Italy) Claudia Giovine	(United Kingdom) Samantha Murray (Estonia) Margit Rüütel (Netherlands) Lesley Kerkhove (France) Elixane Lechemia
March 14	Metepec, Mexico; Hard $10,000; Singles draw – Doubles draw	(Brazil) Teliana Pereira; 6–4, 6–4	(United States) Amanda Fink	(Colombia) Karen Castiblanco (Mexico) Carolina Betancourt	(Japan) Sachie Ishizu (Indonesia) Romana Tedjakusuma (Brazil) Vivian Segnini (Mexico) Nadia Abdala
March 14	Metepec, Mexico; Hard $10,000; Singles draw – Doubles draw	(South Africa) Surina de Beer (Indonesia) Romana Tedjakusuma; 6–2, 6–4	(Mexico) Nadia Abdala (France) Virginie Ayassamy	(Colombia) Karen Castiblanco (Mexico) Carolina Betancourt	(Japan) Sachie Ishizu (Indonesia) Romana Tedjakusuma (Brazil) Vivian Segnini (Mexico) Nadia Abdala
March 14	Miyazaki, Japan; Hard $10,000; Singles draw – Doubles draw	(Japan) Kanae Hisami; 6–3, 6–1	(Japan) Emi Mutaguchi	(Japan) Yuka Higuchi (Japan) Kaori Onishi	(Japan) Yumi Miyazaki (Japan) Yuuki Tanaka (New Zealand) Katherine Westbury (Japan) Yumi Nakano
March 14	Miyazaki, Japan; Hard $10,000; Singles draw – Doubles draw	(Japan) Mari Inoue (Japan) Ayumi Oka; 5–7, 6–2, [10–8]	(Japan) Chinami Ogi (Japan) Yuuki Tanaka	(Japan) Yuka Higuchi (Japan) Kaori Onishi	(Japan) Yumi Miyazaki (Japan) Yuuki Tanaka (New Zealand) Katherine Westbury (Japan) Yumi Nakano
March 14	Santiago, Chile; Clay $10,000; Singles draw – Doubles draw	(Argentina) Paula Ormaechea; 6–2, 7–6^{(7–4)}	(Argentina) Catalina Pella	(Serbia) Nataša Zorić (Paraguay) Verónica Cepede Royg	(Chile) Camila Silva (Czech Republic) Kateřina Kramperová (Brazil) Nathalia Rossi (Brazil) Maria Fernanda Alves
March 14	Santiago, Chile; Clay $10,000; Singles draw – Doubles draw	(Brazil) Maria Fernanda Alves (Argentina) Paula Ormaechea; 6–3, 7–6^{(7–2)}	(Argentina) Barbara Rush (Argentina) Carolina Zeballos	(Serbia) Nataša Zorić (Paraguay) Verónica Cepede Royg	(Chile) Camila Silva (Czech Republic) Kateřina Kramperová (Brazil) Nathalia Rossi (Brazil) Maria Fernanda Alves
March 14	Sanya, China; Hard $25,000; Singles draw – Doubles draw	(Hong Kong) Zhang Ling; 3–6, 7–6^{(7–4)}, 6–2	(France) Iryna Brémond	(South Korea) Lee Ye-ra (Turkey) Çağla Büyükakçay	(China) Liu Chang (Kazakhstan) Galina Voskoboeva (Ukraine) Irina Buryachok (Thailand) Noppawan Lertcheewakarn
March 14	Sanya, China; Hard $25,000; Singles draw – Doubles draw	(France) Iryna Brémond (Croatia) Ani Mijačika; 3–6, 7–5, [12–10]	(Japan) Rika Fujiwara (Chinese Taipei) Hsu Wen-hsin	(South Korea) Lee Ye-ra (Turkey) Çağla Büyükakçay	(China) Liu Chang (Kazakhstan) Galina Voskoboeva (Ukraine) Irina Buryachok (Thailand) Noppawan Lertcheewakarn
March 21	Gonesse, France; Clay $10,000; Singles draw – Doubles draw	(Germany) Anne Schäfer; 7–5, 6–1	(Italy) Anastasia Grymalska	(Italy) Gioia Barbieri (Georgia (country)) Sofia Shapatava	(Poland) Paula Kania (Switzerland) Amra Sadiković (Switzerland) Xenia Knoll (Italy) Nastassya Burnett
March 21	Gonesse, France; Clay $10,000; Singles draw – Doubles draw	(Italy) Gioia Barbieri (Italy) Anastasia Grymalska; 6–3, 6–2	(Germany) Lena-Marie Hofmann (Germany) Scarlett Werner	(Italy) Gioia Barbieri (Georgia (country)) Sofia Shapatava	(Poland) Paula Kania (Switzerland) Amra Sadiković (Switzerland) Xenia Knoll (Italy) Nastassya Burnett
March 21	Antalya, Turkey; Clay $10,000; Singles draw – Doubles draw	(Hungary) Réka-Luca Jani; 6–2, 6–1	(Spain) Garbiñe Muguruza	(Morocco) Fatima El Allami (Netherlands) Daniëlle Harmsen	(Serbia) Dunja Šunkić (Netherlands) Bibiane Schoofs (Bulgaria) Martina Gledacheva (Bosnia and Herzegovina) Jasmina Kajtazović
March 21	Antalya, Turkey; Clay $10,000; Singles draw – Doubles draw	(Belarus) Ilona Kremen (Netherlands) Demi Schuurs; 3–6, 7–6^{(7–3)}, [10–8]	(Bulgaria) Martina Gledacheva (Bulgaria) Isabella Shinikova	(Morocco) Fatima El Allami (Netherlands) Daniëlle Harmsen	(Serbia) Dunja Šunkić (Netherlands) Bibiane Schoofs (Bulgaria) Martina Gledacheva (Bosnia and Herzegovina) Jasmina Kajtazović
March 21	Madrid, Spain; Clay $10,000; Singles draw – Doubles draw	(Spain) Estrella Cabeza Candela; 6–3, 6–2	(Romania) Laura-Ioana Andrei	(Spain) Sara Sorribes Tormo (Spain) Arabela Fernández Rabener	(Norway) Ulrikke Eikeri (Spain) Inés Ferrer Suárez (Poland) Karolina Kosińska (Spain) Lucía Cervera Vázquez
March 21	Madrid, Spain; Clay $10,000; Singles draw – Doubles draw	(Spain) Lucía Cervera Vázquez (Italy) Benedetta Davato; 7–5, 7–6^{(7–4)}	(Poland) Karolina Kosińska (Ukraine) Yevgeniya Kryvoruchko	(Spain) Sara Sorribes Tormo (Spain) Arabela Fernández Rabener	(Norway) Ulrikke Eikeri (Spain) Inés Ferrer Suárez (Poland) Karolina Kosińska (Spain) Lucía Cervera Vázquez
March 21	2011 Aegon GB Pro–Series Bath; Bath, United Kingdom; Hard $25,000; Singles – Doubles	(Switzerland) Stefanie Vögele; 6–7^{(3–7)}, 7–5, 6–2	(Poland) Marta Domachowska	(Bulgaria) Elitsa Kostova (France) Claire Feuerstein	(United Kingdom) Melanie South (Italy) Anna Floris (Russia) Marta Sirotkina (Netherlands) Kiki Bertens
March 21	2011 Aegon GB Pro–Series Bath; Bath, United Kingdom; Hard $25,000; Singles – Doubles	(Hungary) Tímea Babos (Luxembourg) Anne Kremer; 7–6^{(7–5)}, 6–2	(Poland) Marta Domachowska (Poland) Katarzyna Piter	(Bulgaria) Elitsa Kostova (France) Claire Feuerstein	(United Kingdom) Melanie South (Italy) Anna Floris (Russia) Marta Sirotkina (Netherlands) Kiki Bertens
March 21	Moscow, Russia; Hard $25,000; Singles draw – Doubles draw	(Ukraine) Lyudmyla Kichenok; 6–2, 6–0	(Russia) Daria Gavrilova	(Russia) Maria Zharkova (Russia) Alexandra Panova	(Russia) Yuliya Kalabina (Russia) Arina Rodionova (Russia) Ekaterina Yashina (Russia) Aminat Kushkhova
March 21	Moscow, Russia; Hard $25,000; Singles draw – Doubles draw	(Ukraine) Lyudmyla Kichenok (Ukraine) Nadiia Kichenok; 6–3, 6–3	(Russia) Alexandra Panova (Russia) Olga Panova	(Russia) Maria Zharkova (Russia) Alexandra Panova	(Russia) Yuliya Kalabina (Russia) Arina Rodionova (Russia) Ekaterina Yashina (Russia) Aminat Kushkhova
March 21	Namangan, Uzbekistan; Hard $25,000; Singles draw – Doubles draw	(Croatia) Jasmina Tinjić; 7–6^{(7–2)}, 2–6, 7–6^{(7–5)}	(Russia) Ekaterina Bychkova	(Slovakia) Zuzana Luknárová (Ukraine) Kateryna Kozlova	(Ukraine) Tetyana Arefyeva (Ukraine) Valentyna Ivakhnenko (Uzbekistan) Albina Khabibulina (Uzbekistan) Nigina Abduraimova
March 21	Namangan, Uzbekistan; Hard $25,000; Singles draw – Doubles draw	(Uzbekistan) Nigina Abduraimova (Uzbekistan) Albina Khabibulina; 4–6, 7–6^{(7–4)}, [10–8]	(Russia) Ekaterina Bychkova (Russia) Marina Shamayko	(Slovakia) Zuzana Luknárová (Ukraine) Kateryna Kozlova	(Ukraine) Tetyana Arefyeva (Ukraine) Valentyna Ivakhnenko (Uzbekistan) Albina Khabibulina (Uzbekistan) Nigina Abduraimova
March 21	Poza Rica, Mexico; Hard $10,000; Singles draw – Doubles draw	(Bolivia) María Fernanda Álvarez Terán; 6–3, 6–4	(Indonesia) Romana Tedjakusuma	(United States) Amanda Fink (Mexico) Nadia Abdala	(Brazil) Vivian Segnini (Brazil) Fernanda Hermenegildo (Spain) Pilar Domínguez López (Austria) Nicole Rottmann
March 21	Poza Rica, Mexico; Hard $10,000; Singles draw – Doubles draw	(United States) Macall Harkins (Austria) Nicole Rottmann; 6–2, 6–4	(Brazil) Fernanda Hermenegildo (Brazil) Teliana Pereira	(United States) Amanda Fink (Mexico) Nadia Abdala	(Brazil) Vivian Segnini (Brazil) Fernanda Hermenegildo (Spain) Pilar Domínguez López (Austria) Nicole Rottmann
March 21	Rancagua, Chile; Clay $10,000; Singles draw – Doubles draw	(Bulgaria) Aleksandrina Naydenova; 3–6, 6–2, 6–2	(Argentina) Catalina Pella	(Chile) Andrea Koch Benvenuto (Paraguay) Verónica Cepede Royg	(Brazil) Maria Fernanda Alves (Italy) Gaia Sanesi (Paraguay) Isabella Robbiani (Brazil) Nathalia Rossi
March 21	Rancagua, Chile; Clay $10,000; Singles draw – Doubles draw	(Argentina) Andrea Benítez (Brazil) Raquel Piltcher; 7–6^{(7–5)}, 6–1	(Chile) Belén Ludueña (Chile) Daniela Seguel	(Chile) Andrea Koch Benvenuto (Paraguay) Verónica Cepede Royg	(Brazil) Maria Fernanda Alves (Italy) Gaia Sanesi (Paraguay) Isabella Robbiani (Brazil) Nathalia Rossi
March 21	Kunming, China; Hard $25,000; Singles draw – Doubles draw	(France) Iryna Brémond; 1–6, 6–2, 6–3	(Kazakhstan) Zarina Diyas	(China) Duan Yingying (Indonesia) Ayu-Fani Damayanti	(Japan) Aiko Nakamura (Ukraine) Yulia Beygelzimer (Georgia (country)) Oksana Kalashnikova (Hong Kong) Zhang Ling
March 21	Kunming, China; Hard $25,000; Singles draw – Doubles draw	(Japan) Shuko Aoyama (Japan) Rika Fujiwara; 6–3, 6–2	(Ukraine) Irina Buryachok (Ukraine) Veronika Kapshay	(China) Duan Yingying (Indonesia) Ayu-Fani Damayanti	(Japan) Aiko Nakamura (Ukraine) Yulia Beygelzimer (Georgia (country)) Oksana Kalashnikova (Hong Kong) Zhang Ling
March 28	Ipswich, Australia; Clay $25,000; Singles draw – Doubles draw	(Australia) Sally Peers; 5–7, 7–5, 6–0	(Ukraine) Lesia Tsurenko	(Russia) Olga Puchkova (Australia) Olivia Rogowska	(United States) Gail Brodsky (New Zealand) Sacha Jones (Australia) Isabella Holland (Australia) Sophie Letcher
March 28	Ipswich, Australia; Clay $25,000; Singles draw – Doubles draw	(Australia) Casey Dellacqua (Australia) Olivia Rogowska; 6–4, 6–4	(Japan) Miki Miyamura (Japan) Mari Tanaka	(Russia) Olga Puchkova (Australia) Olivia Rogowska	(United States) Gail Brodsky (New Zealand) Sacha Jones (Australia) Isabella Holland (Australia) Sophie Letcher
March 28	Pelham, Alabama, United States; Clay $25,000; Singles draw – Doubles draw	(New Zealand) Marina Erakovic; 6–4, 2–6, 6–1	(Czech Republic) Renata Voráčová	(Romania) Edina Gallovits-Hall (France) Caroline Garcia	(Australia) Johanna Konta (United States) Alexandra Stevenson (United States) Christina McHale (Italy) Camila Giorgi
March 28	Pelham, Alabama, United States; Clay $25,000; Singles draw – Doubles draw	(Latvia) Līga Dekmeijere (Canada) Marie-Ève Pelletier; 2–6, 6–4, [12–10]	(United States) Kimberly Couts (Canada) Heidi El Tabakh	(Romania) Edina Gallovits-Hall (France) Caroline Garcia	(Australia) Johanna Konta (United States) Alexandra Stevenson (United States) Christina McHale (Italy) Camila Giorgi
March 28	Antalya, Turkey; Clay $10,000; Singles draw – Doubles draw	(Georgia (country)) Ekaterine Gorgodze; 6–1, 6–3	(Bulgaria) Isabella Shinikova	(Romania) Cristina Dinu (Sweden) Sandra Roma	(Slovakia) Vivien Juhászová (Italy) Valentina Sulpizio (Sweden) Beatrice Cedermark (Belgium) Valerie Verhamme
March 28	Antalya, Turkey; Clay $10,000; Singles draw – Doubles draw	(Romania) Cristina Dinu (Italy) Andreea Văideanu; 6–3, 6–2	(Czech Republic) Kristýna Hančárová (Czech Republic) Nikola Horáková	(Romania) Cristina Dinu (Sweden) Sandra Roma	(Slovakia) Vivien Juhászová (Italy) Valentina Sulpizio (Sweden) Beatrice Cedermark (Belgium) Valerie Verhamme
March 28	Monzón, Spain; Hard $50,000; Singles draw – Doubles draw	(Czech Republic) Petra Cetkovská; 5–7, 6–4, 6–2	(Belgium) Kirsten Flipkens	(Russia) Nina Bratchikova (Canada) Stéphanie Dubois	(Spain) Lara Arruabarrena (Russia) Ekaterina Ivanova (Switzerland) Stefanie Vögele (Portugal) Maria João Koehler
March 28	Monzón, Spain; Hard $50,000; Singles draw – Doubles draw	(Russia) Elena Bovina (Russia) Valeria Savinykh; 6–1, 2–6, [10–4]	(Georgia (country)) Margalita Chakhnashvili (Croatia) Ivana Lisjak	(Russia) Nina Bratchikova (Canada) Stéphanie Dubois	(Spain) Lara Arruabarrena (Russia) Ekaterina Ivanova (Switzerland) Stefanie Vögele (Portugal) Maria João Koehler
March 28	New Delhi, India; Hard $10,000; Singles draw – Doubles draw	(France) Céline Cattaneo; 6–1, 6–4	(Thailand) Nicha Lertpitaksinchai	(India) Kyra Shroff (Italy) Stephanie Scimone	(India) Ratnika Batra (Austria) Pia König (Slovenia) Anja Prislan (India) Ashvarya Shrivastava
March 28	New Delhi, India; Hard $10,000; Singles draw – Doubles draw	(Slovenia) Anja Prislan (India) Kyra Shroff; 6–3, 7–5	(Austria) Stephanie Hirsch (Austria) Yvonne Neuwirth	(India) Kyra Shroff (Italy) Stephanie Scimone	(India) Ratnika Batra (Austria) Pia König (Slovenia) Anja Prislan (India) Ashvarya Shrivastava
March 28	Astana, Kazakhstan; Hard $10,000; Singles draw – Doubles draw	(Russia) Ekaterina Yashina; 6–7^{(6–8)}, 7–6^{(7–4)}, 6–4	(Russia) Maya Gaverova	(Russia) Natalia Orlova (Russia) Ekaterina Pushkareva	(Belarus) Sviatlana Pirazhenka (Uzbekistan) Albina Khabibulina (Russia) Alexandra Artamonova (Russia) Alexandra Romanova
March 28	Astana, Kazakhstan; Hard $10,000; Singles draw – Doubles draw	(Turkmenistan) Anastasiya Prenko (Russia) Ekaterina Yashina; 6–4, 7–5	(Russia) Nadezda Gorbachkova (Russia) Ekaterina Pushkareva	(Russia) Natalia Orlova (Russia) Ekaterina Pushkareva	(Belarus) Sviatlana Pirazhenka (Uzbekistan) Albina Khabibulina (Russia) Alexandra Artamonova (Russia) Alexandra Romanova
March 28	Wenshan, China; Hard $50,000; Singles draw – Doubles draw	(France) Iryna Brémond; 7–5, 3–6, 7–5	(Croatia) Ani Mijačika	(Luxembourg) Mandy Minella (Kazakhstan) Zarina Diyas	(China) Liang Chen (China) Lu Jingjing (Japan) Kumiko Iijima (United Kingdom) Laura Robson
March 28	Wenshan, China; Hard $50,000; Singles draw – Doubles draw	(Japan) Shuko Aoyama (Japan) Rika Fujiwara; 6–4, 6–0	(China) Liang Chen (China) Tian Ran	(Luxembourg) Mandy Minella (Kazakhstan) Zarina Diyas	(China) Liang Chen (China) Lu Jingjing (Japan) Kumiko Iijima (United Kingdom) Laura Robson
March 28	Ribeirão Preto, Brazil; Clay $10,000; Singles draw – Doubles draw	(Russia) Irina Khromacheva; 6–1, 6–3	(Slovakia) Viktória Maľová	(Brazil) Monique Albuquerque (Bulgaria) Aleksandrina Naydenova	(Brazil) Karina Souza (Brazil) Eduarda Piai (Brazil) Nathaly Kurata (Brazil) Carla Forte
March 28	Ribeirão Preto, Brazil; Clay $10,000; Singles draw – Doubles draw	(Brazil) Gabriela Cé (Russia) Irina Khromacheva; 6–2, 6–4	(Brazil) Monique Albuquerque (Brazil) Isabela Miró	(Brazil) Monique Albuquerque (Bulgaria) Aleksandrina Naydenova	(Brazil) Karina Souza (Brazil) Eduarda Piai (Brazil) Nathaly Kurata (Brazil) Carla Forte
March 28	Buenos Aires, Argentina; Clay $25,000; Singles draw – Doubles draw	(Austria) Patricia Mayr-Achleitner; 0–6, 6–2, 6–2	(Argentina) Florencia Molinero	(Brazil) Vivian Segnini (Paraguay) Verónica Cepede Royg	(Bolivia) María Fernanda Álvarez Terán (Argentina) María Irigoyen (Argentina) Mailen Auroux (Argentina) Paula Ormaechea
March 28	Buenos Aires, Argentina; Clay $25,000; Singles draw – Doubles draw	(Bolivia) María Fernanda Álvarez Terán (Argentina) Paula Ormaechea; 4–6, 7–5, [10–4]	(Argentina) María Irigoyen (Argentina) Florencia Molinero	(Brazil) Vivian Segnini (Paraguay) Verónica Cepede Royg	(Bolivia) María Fernanda Álvarez Terán (Argentina) María Irigoyen (Argentina) Mailen Auroux (Argentina) Paula Ormaechea

== See also ==
- 2011 ITF Women's Circuit
- 2011 ITF Women's Circuit (April–June)
- 2011 ITF Women's Circuit (July–September)
- 2011 ITF Women's Circuit (October–December)
- 2011 WTA Tour
