= 2012 The Bahamas Women's Open – Singles =

Singles
- 2012 The Bahamas Women's Open

Final
- Champion: (Canada) Aleksandra Wozniak
- Runner-up: (France) Alizé Cornet
- Score: 6–4, 7–5

Events
Singles	Doubles
← 2011 ·	The Bahamas Women's Open

Anastasiya Yakimova was the defending champion, but decided not to participate this year.

Aleksandra Wozniak won the title, defeating Alizé Cornet in the final, 6–4, 7–5.

== Seeds ==
1. (France) Pauline Parmentier (second round)
2. (Ukraine) Kateryna Bondarenko (second round)
3. (United Kingdom) Anne Keothavong (semifinals)
4. (Poland) Urszula Radwańska (second round)
5. (Canada) Aleksandra Wozniak (champion)
6. (Canada) Stéphanie Dubois (second round)
7. (France) Virginie Razzano (first round, retired)
8. (Luxembourg) Mandy Minella (second round)

== Draw ==
=== Key ===
- Q = Qualifier
- WC = Wild card
- LL = Lucky loser
- Alt = Alternate
- SE = Special exempt
- PR = Protected ranking
- ITF = ITF entry
- JE = Junior exempt
- w/o = Walkover
- r = Retired
- d = Defaulted
- SR = Special ranking

=== Finals ===
Semifinals
(France) Alizé Cornet	6	6
3	(United Kingdom) Anne Keothavong	3	2
(Serbia) Bojana Jovanovski	7^{7}	4	1
5	(Canada) Aleksandra Wozniak	6^{5}	6	6

Final
(France) Alizé Cornet	4	5
5	(Canada) Aleksandra Wozniak	6	7

=== Top half ===
First round
1	(France) P Parmentier	6	6
(Germany) K Barrois	4	3
(Czech Republic) Kr Plíšková	4
(Russia) A Kudryavtseva	1^{r}
(United States) J Cohen	3	6	3
(France) A Cornet	6	4	6
(Kazakhstan) S Karatantcheva	2	0
8	(Luxembourg) M Minella	6	6
3	(United Kingdom) A Keothavong	6	6^{4}	6
(Slovenia) P Rampre	3	7^{7}	3
(United States) J Craybas	6	6
WC	(United States) R Foster	0	0
Q	(Czech Republic) Ka Plíšková	7	6
(United States) A Riske	5	2
(Croatia) M Lučić	6
7	(France) V Razzano	4	r

Second round
1	(France) P Parmentier	4	1
(Czech Republic) Kr Plíšková	6	6
(France) A Cornet	6	6
8	(Luxembourg) M Minella	1	2
3	(United Kingdom) A Keothavong	6	6
(United States) J Craybas	3	3
Q	(Czech Republic) Ka Plíšková	6	6
(Croatia) M Lučić	4	2

Quarterfinals
(Czech Republic) Kr Plíšková	1	1
(France) A Cornet	6	6
3	(United Kingdom) A Keothavong	7	6
Q	(Czech Republic) Ka Plíšková	5	4

Semifinals
(France) A Cornet	6	6
3	(United Kingdom) A Keothavong	3	2

=== Bottom half ===
First round
6	(Canada) S Dubois	6^{3}	6	6
WC	(United States) A Stevenson	7^{7}	2	2
(Serbia) B Jovanovski	6	6
(Colombia) M Duque-Mariño	1	4
(Czech Republic) E Birnerová	6^{9}	7^{9}	3
WC	(United States) M Sanchez	7^{11}	6^{7}	6
WC	(The Bahamas) S Pratt	0	1
4	(Poland) U Radwańska	6	6
5	(Canada) A Wozniak	7^{7}	6
(Ukraine) O Savchuk	6^{2}	1
Q	(Japan) R Fujiwara	6	6
(Russia) V Savinykh	1	3
Q	(United States) G Brodsky	1	6	6
Q	(United States) C Vandeweghe	6	4	3
(Russia) N Bratchikova	6	0	2
2	(Ukraine) K Bondarenko	4	6	6

Second round
6	(Canada) S Dubois	3	1
(Serbia) B Jovanovski	6	6
WC	(United States) M Sanchez	6	6
4	(Poland) U Radwańska	2	2
5	(Canada) A Wozniak	6	6
Q	(Japan) R Fujiwara	3	2
Q	(United States) G Brodsky	6	7^{8}
2	(Ukraine) K Bondarenko	3	6^{6}

Quarterfinals
(Serbia) B Jovanovski	6	7^{7}
WC	(United States) M Sanchez	1	6^{5}
5	(Canada) A Wozniak	6	3
Q	(United States) G Brodsky	0	0^{r}

Semifinals
(Serbia) B Jovanovski	7^{7}	4	1
5	(Canada) A Wozniak	6^{5}	6	6
