= 2011 The Bahamas Women's Open =

- Date: 14–20 March
- Edition: 1st
- Location: Nassau, Bahamas

Champions

Singles
- (Belarus) Anastasiya Yakimova

Doubles
- (South Africa) Natalie Grandin / (Czech Republic) Vladimíra Uhlířová
The Bahamas Women's Open	· 2012 →

The 2011 The Bahamas Women's Open was a professional tennis tournament played on hard courts. It was part of the 2011 ITF Women's Circuit. It took place in Nassau, Bahamas between 14 and 20 March 2011.

== Singles entrants ==
=== Seeds ===
Country	Player	Rank^{1}	Seed
CZE	Petra Kvitová	14	1
BUL	Tsvetana Pironkova	33	2
SUI	Timea Bacsinszky	46	3
CAN	Rebecca Marino	63	4
GER	Angelique Kerber	67	5
SWE	Johanna Larsson	69	6
AUS	Anastasia Rodionova	72	7
SVK	Magdaléna Rybáriková	73	8

- Rankings are as of March 7, 2010.

=== Other entrants ===
The following players received wildcards into the singles main draw:

- (Switzerland) Timea Bacsinszky
- (Czech Republic) Petra Kvitová
- (Germany) Sabine Lisicki
- (United States) Alexandra Stevenson

The following players received entry from the qualifying draw:

- (Australia) Sophie Ferguson
- (China) Han Xinyun
- (Ukraine) Olga Savchuk
- (United Kingdom) Heather Watson

== Champions ==
=== Singles ===
(Belarus) Anastasiya Yakimova def. (Germany) Angelique Kerber, 6–3, 6–2

=== Doubles ===
(South Africa) Natalie Grandin / (Czech Republic) Vladimíra Uhlířová def. (United States) Raquel Kops-Jones / (United States) Abigail Spears, 6–4, 6–2
