= 2011 The Bahamas Women's Open – Doubles =

Doubles
- 2011 The Bahamas Women's Open

Final
- Champions: (South Africa) Natalie Grandin (Czech Republic) Vladimíra Uhlířová
- Runners-up: (United States) Raquel Kops-Jones (United States) Abigail Spears
- Score: 6–4, 6–2

Events
Singles	Doubles
The Bahamas Women's Open	· 2012 →

It was the first edition of the tournament.
Natalie Grandin and Vladimíra Uhlířová won in the final against Raquel Kops-Jones and Abigail Spears 6–4, 6–2.

== Seeds ==
1. (South Africa) Natalie Grandin / (Czech Republic) Vladimíra Uhlířová (champions)
2. (Romania) Edina Gallovits-Hall / (Romania) Monica Niculescu (semifinals)
3. (United States) Raquel Kops-Jones / (United States) Abigail Spears (final)
4. (Czech Republic) Andrea Hlaváčková / (Slovakia) Magdaléna Rybáriková (first round)

== Draw ==
=== Key ===
- Q = Qualifier
- WC = Wild card
- LL = Lucky loser
- Alt = Alternate
- ITF = ITF entry
- PR = Protected ranking
- SR = Special ranking
- SE = Special exempt
- JE = Junior exempt
- JR = Junior Accelerator Programme entrant
- CO = College Accelerator Programme entrant
- NG = Next Gen Accelerator Program entrant
- w/o = Walkover
- r = Retired
- d = Defaulted

=== Draw ===
First round
1	(South Africa) N Grandin (Czech Republic) V Uhlířová	6	6
(Canada) S Fichman (France) S Lefèvre	4	2
(Sweden) J Larsson (Germany) T Malek	6	1	[2]
(Ukraine) K Bondarenko (Ukraine) O Savchuk	2	6	[10]
4	(Czech Republic) A Hlaváčková (Slovakia) M Rybáriková	6	5	[8]
Alt	(Netherlands) A Rus (Belarus) A Yakimova	4	7	[10]
(United Kingdom) S Borwell (Latvia) L Dekmeijere	4	6	[11]
WC	(The Bahamas) N Fountain (The Bahamas) L Russell	6	4	[9]
(United States) J Craybas (United Kingdom) A Keothavong	6	6
(China) W Liu (China) S Sun	4	4
(Romania) E Bogdan (Romania) IR Olaru	6^{5}	6	[4]
3	(United States) R Kops-Jones (United States) A Spears	7	2	[10]
(Germany) K Barrois (Austria) Y Meusburger	3	5
(Italy) A Brianti (China) S Zhang	6	7
(Australia) An Rodionova (Russia) Ar Rodionova	2	4
2	(Romania) E Gallovits-Hall (Romania) M Niculescu	6	6

Quarterfinals
1	(South Africa) N Grandin (Czech Republic) V Uhlířová	6	6
(Ukraine) K Bondarenko (Ukraine) O Savchuk	2	3
Alt	(Netherlands) A Rus (Belarus) A Yakimova	6	6
(United Kingdom) S Borwell (Latvia) L Dekmeijere	1	3
(United States) J Craybas (United Kingdom) A Keothavong	5	4
3	(United States) R Kops-Jones (United States) A Spears	7	6
(Italy) A Brianti (China) S Zhang	1	3
2	(Romania) E Gallovits-Hall (Romania) M Niculescu	6	6

Semifinals
1	(South Africa) N Grandin (Czech Republic) V Uhlířová	6	7
Alt	(Netherlands) A Rus (Belarus) A Yakimova	1	6^{4}
3	(United States) R Kops-Jones (United States) A Spears	7	6
2	(Romania) E Gallovits-Hall (Romania) M Niculescu	6^{2}	4

Finals
1	(South Africa) N Grandin (Czech Republic) V Uhlířová	6	6
3	(United States) R Kops-Jones (United States) A Spears	4	2
