= 2012 The Bahamas Women's Open – Doubles =

Doubles
- 2012 The Bahamas Women's Open

Final
- Champions: (Slovakia) Janette Husárová (Hungary) Katalin Marosi
- Runners-up: (Czech Republic) Eva Birnerová (United Kingdom) Anne Keothavong
- Score: 6–1, 3–6, [10–6]

Events
Singles	Doubles
← 2011 ·	The Bahamas Women's Open

Natalie Grandin and Vladimíra Uhlířová were the defending champions, but lost in the semifinals to Janette Husárová and Katalin Marosi.

Janette Husárová and Katalin Marosi won the title, defeating Eva Birnerová and Anne Keothavong in the final, 6–1, 3–6, [10–6].

== Seeds ==
1. (South Africa) Natalie Grandin / (Czech Republic) Vladimíra Uhlířová (semifinals)
2. (Japan) Rika Fujiwara / (Poland) Klaudia Jans-Ignacik (first round)
3. (Germany) Kristina Barrois / (Germany) Jasmin Wöhr (first round)
4. (United States) Jill Craybas / (Australia) Anastasia Rodionova (quarterfinals)

== Draw ==
=== Key ===
- Q = Qualifier
- WC = Wild card
- LL = Lucky loser
- Alt = Alternate
- SE = Special exempt
- PR = Protected ranking
- ITF = ITF entry
- JE = Junior exempt
- w/o = Walkover
- r = Retired
- d = Defaulted
- SR = Special ranking

=== Draw ===
First round
1	(South Africa) N Grandin (Czech Republic) V Uhlířová	6	7^{7}
(Czech Republic) Ka Plíšková (Czech Republic) Kr Plíšková	2	6^{4}
WC	(United States) R Foster (The Bahamas) S Pratt	6^{7}	7	[2]
WC	(The Bahamas) N Fountain (The Bahamas) L Russell	7^{9}	5	[10]
4	(United States) J Craybas (Australia) A Rodionova	3	6	[10]
WC	(United States) M Sanchez (United States) Y Schnack	6	3	[8]
(Slovakia) J Husárová (Hungary) K Marosi	6	7^{9}
(Ukraine) O Savchuk (Russia) V Savinykh	1	6^{7}
(Luxembourg) M Minella (Poland) U Radwańska	6	6
(Canada) S Fichman (Canada) M-È Pelletier	4	4
(Czech Republic) E Birnerová (United Kingdom) A Keothavong	6	6
3	(Germany) K Barrois (Germany) J Wöhr	4	4
(United States) L Lee-Waters (United States) M Moulton-Levy	6	6
(France) A Cornet (France) P Parmentier	4	3
(Russia) N Bratchikova (Croatia) D Jurak	6	6
2	(Japan) R Fujiwara (Poland) K Jans-Ignacik	3	3

Quarterfinals
1	(South Africa) N Grandin (Czech Republic) V Uhlířová	6	6
WC	(The Bahamas) N Fountain (The Bahamas) L Russell	1	0
4	(United States) J Craybas (Australia) A Rodionova	6	6^{4}	[5]
(Slovakia) J Husárová (Hungary) K Marosi	2	7^{7}	[10]
(Luxembourg) M Minella (Poland) U Radwańska	4	6	[1]
(Czech Republic) E Birnerová (United Kingdom) A Keothavong	6	3	[10]
(United States) L Lee-Waters (United States) M Moulton-Levy	3	2
(Russia) N Bratchikova (Croatia) D Jurak	6	6

Semifinals
1	(South Africa) N Grandin (Czech Republic) V Uhlířová	6^{3}	6	[0]
(Slovakia) J Husárová (Hungary) K Marosi	7^{7}	3	[10]
(Czech Republic) E Birnerová (United Kingdom) A Keothavong	6	5	[10]
(Russia) N Bratchikova (Croatia) D Jurak	3	7	[8]

Finals
(Slovakia) J Husárová (Hungary) K Marosi	6	3	[10]
(Czech Republic) E Birnerová (United Kingdom) A Keothavong	1	6	[6]
