= 2011 The Bahamas Women's Open – Singles =

Singles
- 2011 The Bahamas Women's Open

Final
- Champions: (Belarus) Anastasiya Yakimova
- Runners-up: (Germany) Angelique Kerber
- Score: 6–3, 6–2

Events
Singles	Doubles
The Bahamas Women's Open	· 2012 →

This is the first edition of the tournament.
Anastasiya Yakimova won the tournament by defeating 5th seed Angelique Kerber 6–3, 6–2 in the final.

== Seeds ==
1. (Czech Republic) Petra Kvitová (first round)
2. (Bulgaria) Tsvetana Pironkova (quarterfinals)
3. (Switzerland) Timea Bacsinszky (quarterfinals)
4. (Canada) Rebecca Marino (semifinals)
5. (Germany) Angelique Kerber (finals)
6. (Sweden) Johanna Larsson (first round)
7. (Australia) Anastasia Rodionova (second round)
8. (Slovakia) Magdaléna Rybáriková (semifinals)

== Main draw ==
=== Key ===
- Q = Qualifier
- WC = Wild card
- LL = Lucky loser
- Alt = Alternate
- SE = Special exempt
- PR = Protected ranking
- ITF = ITF entry
- JE = Junior exempt
- w/o = Walkover
- r = Retired
- d = Defaulted
- SR = Special ranking

=== Finals ===
Semifinals
(Belarus) Anastasiya Yakimova	6	7
8	(Slovakia) Magdaléna Rybáriková	1	5
4	(Canada) Rebecca Marino	6^{2}	4
5	(Germany) Angelique Kerber	7	6

Final
(Belarus) Anastasiya Yakimova	6	6
5	(Germany) Angelique Kerber	3	2

=== Top half ===
First round
1/WC	(Czech Republic) P Kvitová	6	5	3
(Germany) K Barrois	1	7	6
(Netherlands) A Rus	6	6
(United States) J Craybas	3	4
(Belarus) A Yakimova	6	6
(Belgium) K Flipkens	4	1
Q	(Ukraine) O Savchuk	4	7	5
7	(Australia) A Rodionova	6	6^{3}	7
3/WC	(Switzerland) T Bacsinszky	7	6
(United States) A Riske	5	4
(Romania) E Gallovits-Hall	2	6	5
(Russia) E Rodina	6	3	7
(Ukraine) K Bondarenko	6	6
Q	(China) X Han	0	3
WC	(Germany) S Lisicki	6^{5}	3
8	(Slovakia) M Rybáriková	7	6

Second round
(Germany) K Barrois	5	2
(Netherlands) A Rus	7	6
(Belarus) A Yakimova	6	6
7	(Australia) A Rodionova	0	2
3/WC	(Switzerland) T Bacsinszky	6	6
(Russia) E Rodina	2	3
(Ukraine) K Bondarenko	6^{5}	6	2
8	(Slovakia) M Rybáriková	7	2	6

Quarterfinals
(Netherlands) A Rus	3	3
(Belarus) A Yakimova	6	6
3/WC	(Switzerland) T Bacsinszky	1	4
8	(Slovakia) M Rybáriková	6	6

Semifinals
(Belarus) A Yakimova	6	7
8	(Slovakia) M Rybáriková	1	5

=== Bottom half ===
First round
6	(Sweden) J Larsson	7	4	4
Q	(United Kingdom) H Watson	6^{8}	6	6
(Russia) K Pervak	6^{4}	2
(Italy) A Brianti	7	6
WC	(United States) A Stevenson	4	6	4
(France) P Parmentier	6	3	6
Q	(Australia) S Ferguson	3	2
4	(Canada) R Marino	6	6
5	(Germany) A Kerber	6	6
(Croatia) M Lučić	1	2
(Austria) P Mayr-Achleitner	2	1
(United Kingdom) A Keothavong	6	6
(United States) V Lepchenko	6	6
(Austria) Y Meusburger	2	2
(Czech Republic) A Hlaváčková	1	4
2	(Bulgaria) T Pironkova	6	6

Second round
Q	(United Kingdom) H Watson	6	6
(Italy) A Brianti	1	1
(France) P Parmentier	2	6	4
4	(Canada) R Marino	6	3	6
5	(Germany) A Kerber	7	6
(United Kingdom) A Keothavong	5	3
(United States) V Lepchenko	3	3
2	(Bulgaria) T Pironkova	6	6

Quarterfinals
Q	(United Kingdom) H Watson	3	6	4
4	(Canada) R Marino	6	4	6
5	(Germany) A Kerber	6	7
2	(Bulgaria) T Pironkova	3	5

Semifinals
4	(Canada) R Marino	6^{2}	4
5	(Germany) A Kerber	7	6
