= Paula Ormaechea =

Argentine tennis player (born 1992)

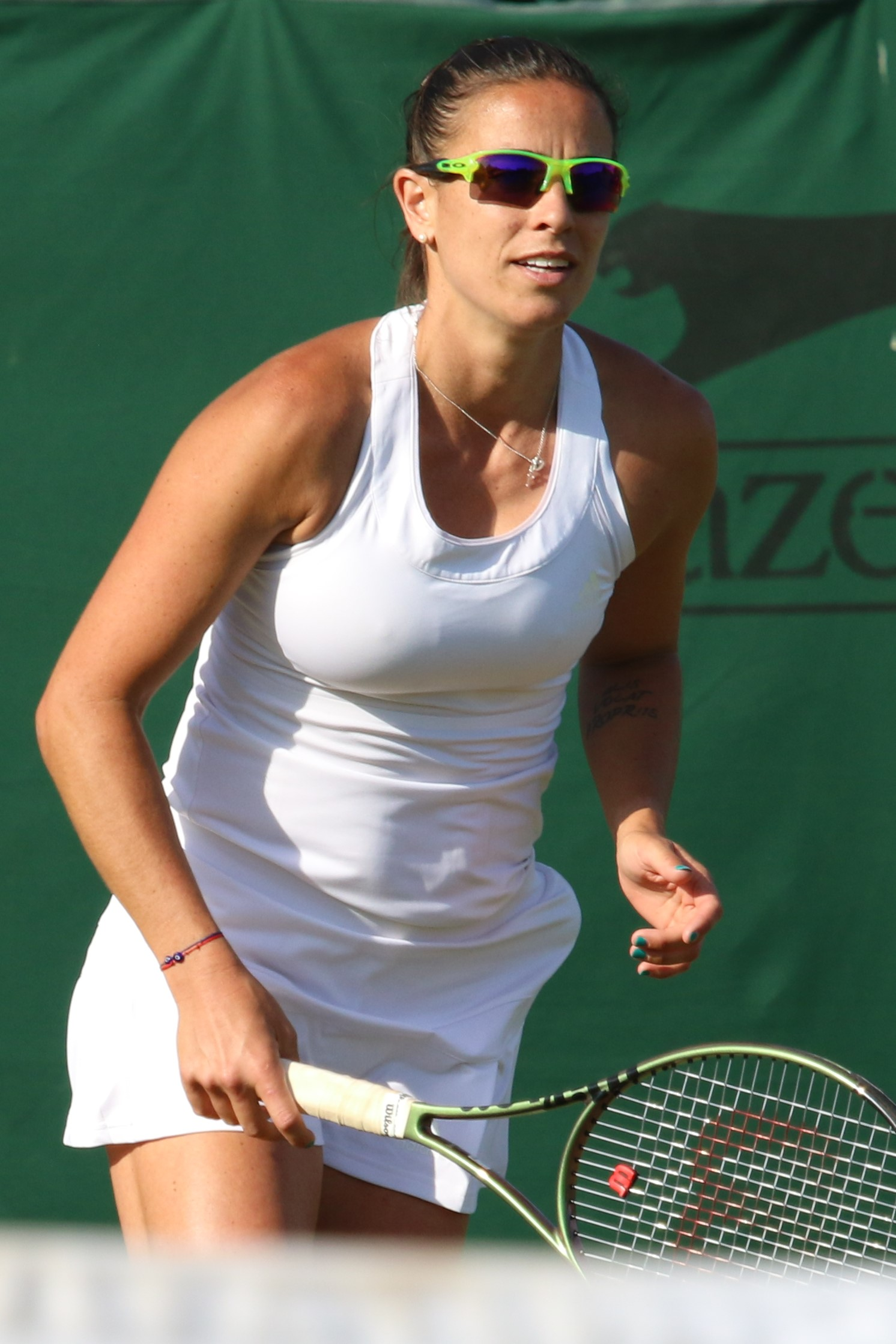
- Ormaechea at the 2022 Wimbledon Championships
- Country (sports): Argentina
- Residence: Buenos Aires, Argentina
- Born: 28 September 1992 (age 33) Sunchales, Argentina
- Height: 1.70 m (5 ft 7 in)
- Turned pro: 2007
- Plays: Right-handed (two-handed backhand)
- Prize money: $1,107,541

Singles
- Career record: 411–280
- Career titles: 16 ITF
- Highest ranking: No. 59 (21 October 2013)
- Current ranking: No. 840 (26 August 2024)

Grand Slam singles results
- Australian Open: 2R (2012)
- French Open: 3R (2013, 2014)
- Wimbledon: 1R (2014)
- US Open: 2R (2013)

Doubles
- Career record: 147–134
- Career titles: 9 ITF
- Highest ranking: No. 188 (22 July 2013)

Grand Slam doubles results
- Australian Open: 1R (2014)
- Wimbledon: 1R (2013)
- US Open: 1R (2013)

Team competitions
- Fed Cup: 21–13
Medal record
Representing Argentina
Women's Tennis
Pan American Games
Bronze medal – third place	2015 Toronto	Doubles
- Last updated on: 2 September 2024.

Paula Ormaechea (Spanish pronunciation: [ˈpawla oɾmaeˈtʃea]; born 28 September 1992) is an Argentine tennis player based in Italy. She has won sixteen singles and nine doubles titles on the ITF Circuit. On 21 October 2013, she reached a career-high singles ranking of world No. 59.

Ormaechea has a 21–13 win–loss record, playing for Argentina Fed Cup team. She plays in the Italian Tennis Serie A1 (major circuit) in the Tennis Club Rungg of Eppan an der Weinstraße, in South Tyrol near Bolzano.

== Personal life ==
Paula Ormaechea was born 1992 to Mirna and Marcelo Ormaechea. She has two sisters, Valentina and Sofía. Juan Pablo Guzmán, former ATP tennis player, serves as her coach. Ormaechea cites Roger Federer, Serena and Venus Williams as her role models, and also admires Andre Agassi and Pete Sampras.

== Career review ==
=== Junior career ===
Ormaechea entered professional junior tournaments in 2006. She defeated Kristina Mladenovic in the semifinals of the Banana Bowl, but lost to Ana Bogdan in the final. Ormaechea won her next title at the Uruguay Bowl in March 2009. She also played at the French Open and US Open, but fell to Bianca Botto and Richèl Hogenkamp in the first round, respectively. In addition, she won four doubles events, her last junior doubles title came at Canadian Open championship in September 2009.

=== Fed Cup / BJK Cup ===
Ormaechea made her debut for Argentina Fed Cup team on 26 April 2009 in the 2009 World Group Playoff against Ukraine. She partnered María Irigoyen, losing to Mariya Koryttseva and Olga Savchuk in straight sets. Ormaechea made her singles debut in 2010 World Group II rubber against Estonia. She lost her first match to world No. 61, Kaia Kanepi, and the second one to Maret Ani. Ormaechea also played in the rubber against Canada, and lost both of her singles matches — against Aleksandra Wozniak and Valérie Tétreault.

=== 2011 ===
Her first tournament was an ITF event in Colombia, where she lost to Alexandra Cadanțu in straight sets in the first round of qualifying. After this, she played the Copa Colsanitas, but again lost in qualifying, this time in the second round. Despite her bad run, Paula rebounded and won an ITF tournament in Santiago, Chile one month later. She then played four ITF events during May, reaching the final of one, but losing to top seed Lucie Hradecká.

Paula then played the qualifying for the Brussels Open, her first Premier tournament. She got to the final round of qualifying after defeating Catalina Castaño and Andrea Hlaváčková, but was then swept aside by doubles specialist Abigail Spears, 6–1, 6–1.

Following this loss, she headed to Rome to play a $25k tournament, but lost in the second round to Sofia Shapatava. Then, following another loss in the quarterfinals of an ITF event in Poland and an early elimination in the qualifying at the Budapest Grand Prix, Paula's form improved when she qualified for the Gastein Ladies in Kitzbühel, Austria. She there lost in the first round of the main draw to María José Martínez Sánchez, in straight sets.

Paula then took a break from the WTA Tour, playing eight ITF events from August to October, winning two of them.

=== 2012 ===
Ormaechea began new season at the Sydney International where she lost in the second round of qualifying to 13th seed Vania King. Following this loss, she headed to Melbourne for the Australian Open where she qualified for her first Grand Slam main draw beating seventh seed CoCo Vandeweghe, Hsieh Su-wei, and 19th seed Yvonne Meusburger. In the first round of the main draw, she overcame Simona Halep in three sets. In the second round, however, she was sent crashing out by eighth seed Agnieszka Radwańska, in straight sets. Due to her strong beginning of the new season, her ranking peaked at over No. 140 for the first time.

=== 2013: French Open 3rd round, top 100 and new career-high rankings ===
She made her debut in the top 100 on 10 June 2013, at world No. 81, following the 2013 French Open where she reached the third round.

She reached a career-high of No. 59, on 21 October 2013.

== Performance timelines ==
Key
W	F	SF	QF	#R	RR	Q#	P#	DNQ	A	Z#	PO	G	S	B	NMS	NTI	P	NH

(W) winner; (F) finalist; (SF) semifinalist; (QF) quarterfinalist; (#R) rounds 4, 3, 2, 1; (RR) round-robin stage; (Q#) qualification round; (P#) preliminary round; (DNQ) did not qualify; (A) absent; (Z#) Davis/Fed Cup Zonal Group (with number indication) or (PO) play-off; (G) gold, (S) silver or (B) bronze Olympic/Paralympic medal; (NMS) not a Masters tournament; (NTI) not a Tier I tournament; (P) postponed; (NH) not held; (SR) strike rate (events won / competed); (W–L) win–loss record.
To avoid confusion and double counting, these charts are updated at the conclusion of a tournament or when the player's participation has ended.

Only main-draw results in WTA Tour, Grand Slam tournaments, Fed Cup/Billie Jean King Cup and Olympic Games are included in win–loss records.

=== Singles ===
Current through the 2023 Charleston Open.

Tournament	2010	2011	2012	2013	2014	2015	...	2019	2020	2021	2022	2023	SR	W–L	Win%
Grand Slam tournaments
Australian Open	A	A	2R	Q1	1R	Q2		Q2	A	A	Q1	Q1	0 / 2	1–2	33%
French Open	A	A	1R	3R	3R	Q1		A	A	A	Q1	Q1	0 / 3	4–3	57%
Wimbledon	A	A	Q1	Q2	1R	A		Q1	NH	A	Q1	Q1	0 / 1	0–1	0%
US Open	A	A	Q3	2R	1R	A		Q1	A	Q1	A	A	0 / 2	1–2	33%
Win–loss	0–0	0–0	1–2	3–2	2–4	0–0		0–0	0–0	0–0	0–0	0–0	0 / 8	6–8	43%
WTA 1000
Dubai / Qatar Open (Note: The first Premier 5 event of the year has switched back and forth between the Dubai Tennis Championships and the Qatar Ladies Open since 2009. Dubai was classified as a Premier 5 event from 2009 to 2011 before being succeeded by Doha for the 2012–2014 period. In 2015, Dubai regained its Premier 5 status while Doha was demoted to Premier status. The two tournaments have since alternated status every year. The Premier 5 tournaments were reclassified as WTA 1000 tournaments in 2021.)	A	A	A	A	A	A		A	A	A	A	A	0 / 0	0–0	–
Indian Wells Open	A	A	Q2	A	1R	Q1		A	NH	Q1	A	A	0 / 1	0–1	0%
Miami Open	A	A	Q1	Q1	2R	A		A	NH	A	A	A	0 / 1	1–1	50%
Madrid Open	A	A	Q1	A	Q1	A		A	NH	A	A		0 / 0	0–0	–
Italian Open	A	A	Q2	A	2R	A		A	A	A	Q1		0 / 1	1–1	50%
Canadian Open	A	A	A	Q2	Q1	A		A	NH	A	A		0 / 0	0–0	–
Cincinnati Open	A	A	A	Q1	Q1	A		A	A	A	A		0 / 0	0–0	–
Pan Pacific / Wuhan Open (Note: In 2014, the Pan Pacific Open was downgraded to a Premier event and replaced by the Wuhan Open. The Premier 5 tournaments were reclassified as WTA 1000 tournaments in 2021.)	A	A	A	1R	A	A		A	NH				0 / 1	0–1	0%
China Open	A	A	A	Q1	A	A		A	NH				0 / 0	0–0	–
Guadalajara Open	NH										A		0 / 0	0–0	–
Career statistics
Tournaments	0	1	5	6	17	2		2	0	3	1	1	Career total: 38		
Overall win–loss	0–2	0–1	4–5	10–7	11–19	2–3		1–2	1–0	2–3	0–1	0–1	0 / 38	30–44	41%

=== Doubles ===
Tournament	2012	2013	2014	W–L
Australian Open	A	A	1R	0–1
French Open	A	A	1R	0–1
Wimbledon	Q1	1R	Q1	0–1
US Open	A	1R	A	0–1
Win–loss	0–0	0–2	0–2	0–4

== WTA Tour finals ==
=== Singles: 1 (runner-up) ===
Legend Grand Slam WTA 1000 WTA 500 WTA 250 (0–1)	Finals by surface Hard (0–0) Clay (0–1) Grass (0–0) Carpet (0–0)

Result	W–L	Date	Tournament	Tier	Surface	Opponent	Score
Loss	0–1	Feb 2013	Copa Colsanitas, Colombia	International (Note: The WTA International tournaments were reclassified as WTA 250 tournaments in 2021.)	Clay	(Serbia) Jelena Janković	1–6, 2–6

== WTA Challenger finals ==
=== Singles: 1 (runner-up) ===
Result	W–L	Date	Tournament	Surface	Opponent	Score
Loss	0–1	Feb 2023	Copa Cali, Colombia	Clay	(Argentina) Nadia Podoroska	4–6, 2–6

== ITF Circuit finals ==
=== Singles: 32 (16 titles, 16 runner–ups) ===
Legend $60,000 tournaments (1–5) $25,000 tournaments (7–7) $10/15,000 tournaments (8–4)	Finals by surface Hard (0–1) Clay (16–15)

Result	W–L	Date	Tournament	Tier	Surface	Opponent	Score
Loss	0–1	Oct 2009	ITF Juárez, Mexico	10,000	Clay	(Argentina) Mailen Auroux	6–4, 4–6, 2–6
Win	1–1	Nov 2009	ITF Buenos Aires, Argentina	10,000	Clay	(Argentina) Verónica Spiegel	6–4, 3–6, 6–2
Win	2–1	Nov 2009	ITF Asunción, Paraguay	10,000	Clay	(Chile) Andrea Koch Benvenuto	4–6, 6–4, 6–2
Loss	2–2	Dec 2009	ITF Buenos Aires, Argentina	25,000	Clay	(Paraguay) Rossana de los Ríos	5–7, 1–6
Loss	2–3	Jun 2010	ITF Buenos Aires, Argentina	10,000	Clay	(Argentina) Mailen Auroux	1–6, 5–7
Win	3–3	Jun 2010	ITF Buenos Aires, Argentina	10,000	Clay	(Argentina) Lucía Jara Lozano	6–2, 6–2
Win	4–3	Jul 2010	Open Bogotá, Colombia	25,000	Clay	(United States) Julia Cohen	7–5, 6–2
Win	5–3	Jul 2010	ITF Brasília, Brazil	10,000	Clay	(Brazil) Ana Clara Duarte	3–6, 7–6^{(1)}, 7–6^{(6)}
Win	6–3	Mar 2011	ITF Santiago, Chile	10,000	Clay	(Argentina) Catalina Pella	6–2, 7–6^{(4)}
Loss	6–4	May 2011	Prague Open, Czech Republic	50,000	Clay	(Czech Republic) Lucie Hradecká	4–6, 6–3, 6–2
Win	7–4	Sep 2011	Royal Cup, Montenegro	25,000	Clay	(Montenegro) Danka Kovinić	6–1, 6–1
Win	8–4	Sep 2011	ITF Foggia, Italy	25,000	Clay	(Czech Republic) Renata Voráčová	6–4, 6–4
Loss	8–5	Oct 2011	ITF Villa de Madrid, Spain	25,000	Clay	(Italy) Nastassja Burnett	2–6, 3–6
Win	9–5	May 2013	Open Saint-Gaudens, France	50,000	Clay	(Germany) Dinah Pfizenmaier	6–3, 3–6, 6–4
Win	10–5	Jun 2015	ITF Padua, Italy	25,000	Clay	(Hungary) Réka Luca Jani	6–3, 6–4
Win	11–5	Apr 2016	ITF Sao Jose do Rio Preto, Brazil	10,000	Clay	(Brazil) Laura Pigossi	6–4, 6–1
Win	12–5	Apr 2016	ITF Lins, Brazil	10,000	Clay	(France) Harmony Tan	6–3, 6–2
Win	13–5	Apr 2016	ITF Bauru, Brazil	10,000	Clay	(Argentina) Julieta Lara Estable	1–6, 6–3, 7–5
Loss	13–6	Sep 2016	Royal Cup, Montenegro	25,000	Clay	(Netherlands) Quirine Lemoine	5–7, 1–6
Loss	13–7	Dec 2017	ITF Antalya, Turkey	15,000	Clay	(Croatia) Tena Lukas	4–6, 7–6^{(5)}, 1–6
Win	14–7	Jul 2018	ITF Baja, Hungary	25,000	Clay	(Slovenia) Nina Potočnik	6–3, 7–5
Loss	14–8	Sep 2018	Zagreb Ladies Open, Croatia	60,000	Clay	(Croatia) Tereza Mrdeža	6–2, 4–6, 5–7
Loss	14–9	Nov 2018	Copa Colina, Chile	60,000	Clay	(China) Xu Shilin	5–7, 3–6
Win	15–9	Sep 2019	ITF Sankt Pölten, Austria	25,000	Clay	(Hungary) Réka Luca Jani	2–6, 6–3, 6–3
Loss	15–10	Mar 2021	ITF Amiens, France	15,000	Clay (i)	(Australia) Seone Mendez	4–6, 2–6
Loss	15–11	Jun 2021	ITF Denain, France	25,000	Clay	(Hungary) Dalma Gálfi	7–5, 2–6, 4–6
Loss	15–12	Jul 2021	ITS Cup, Czech Republic	60,000	Clay	(Czech Republic) Sara Bejlek	0–6, 0–6
Loss	15–13	Jan 2022	Traralgon International, Australia	60,000+H	Hard	(China) Yuan Yue	3–6, 2–6
Loss	15–14	Feb 2022	ITF Tucumán, Argentina	25,000	Clay	(Czech Republic) Brenda Fruhvirtová	3–6, 6–1, 4–6
Loss	15–15	Mar 2022	ITF Anapoima, Colombia	25,000	Clay	(Russia) Marina Melnikova	2–6, 1–6
Loss	15–16	Sep 2022	ITF Otočec, Slovenia	25,000	Clay	(Romania) Miriam Bulgaru	5–7, 4–6
Win	16–16	Oct 2022	ITF Tucumán, Argentina	25,000	Clay	(Ukraine) Valeriya Strakhova	6–2, 6–3

=== Doubles: 25 (10 titles, 15 runner–ups) ===
Legend $60,000 tournaments (2–0) $25/35 tournaments (6–8) $10/15 tournaments (2–7)	Finals by surface Hard (0–0) Clay (10–15)

Result	W–L	Date	Tournament	Tier	Surface	Partner	Opponents	Score
Loss	0–1	Oct 2008	ITF Santa Cruz, Bolivia	10,000	Clay	(Peru) Claudia Razzeto	(Argentina) Rocio Galarza (Chile) Gabriela Roux	6–7^{(5)}, 6–3, [9–11]
Loss	0–2	Oct 2008	ITF Lima, Peru	10,000	Clay	(Venezuela) Marina Giral Lores	(Chile) Andrea Koch Benvenuto (Colombia) Karen Castiblanco	2–6, 1–6
Loss	0–3	Oct 2008	ITF Lima, Peru	10,000	Clay	(Venezuela) Marina Giral Lores	(Chile) Andrea Koch Benvenuto (Colombia) Karen Castiblanco	7–6^{(7)}, 0–6, [3–10]
Loss	0–4	Nov 2009	ITF Lima, Peru	10,000	Clay	(Argentina) Agustina Eskenazi	(Chile) Cecilia Costa Melgar (Chile) Andrea Koch Benvenuto	1–6, 3–6
Win	1–4	Jul 2010	ITF Bogotá, Colombia	25,000	Clay	(Venezuela) Andrea Gámiz	(Argentina) Mailen Auroux (Colombia) Karen Castiblanco	5–7, 6–4, [10–8]
Loss	1–5	Dec 2010	ITF Rio de Janeiro, Brazil	25,000	Clay	(France) Alizé Lim	(Brazil) Maria Fernanda Alves (Brazil) Ana Clara Duarte	default
Win	2–5	Mar 2011	ITF Santiago, Chile	10,000	Clay	(Brazil) Maria Fernanda Alves	(Argentina) Barbara Rush (Argentina) Carolina Zeballos	6–3, 7–6^{(2)}
Win	3–5	Apr 2011	ITF Buenos Aires, Argentina	25,000	Clay	(Bolivia) María Fernanda Álvarez Terán	(Argentina) María Irigoyen (Argentina) Florencia Molinero	4–6, 7–5, [10–4]
Win	4–5	Jun 2011	ITF Rome, Italy	25,000	Clay	(Paraguay) Verónica Cepede Royg	(Russia) Marina Shamayko (Georgia (country)) Sofia Shapatava	7–5, 6–4
Win	5–5	May 2013	Open Saint-Gaudens, France	50,000	Clay	(Israel) Julia Glushko	(Canada) Stéphanie Dubois (Japan) Kurumi Nara	7–5, 7–6^{(11)}
Loss	5–6	Mar 2015	ITF Palm Harbor, United States	25,000	Clay	(Argentina) María Irigoyen	(Czech Republic) Petra Krejsová (Brazil) Paula Cristina Gonçalves	2–6, 4–6
Loss	5–7	Jun 2015	ITF Padua, Italy	25,000	Clay	(Hungary) Réka Luca Jani	(Argentina) María Irigoyen (Czech Republic) Barbora Krejčíková	4–6, 2–6
Loss	5–8	Apr 2016	ITF Lins, Brazil	10,000	Clay	(Argentina) Constanza Vega	(Chile) Bárbara Gatica (Argentina) Stephanie Petit	5–7, 3–6
Loss	5–9	Aug 2017	ITF Oldenzaal, Netherlands	15,000	Clay	(Mexico) Ana Sofía Sánchez	(Belgium) Deborah Kerfs (United States) Chiara Scholl	5–7, 3–6
Win	6–9	Sep 2017	ITF Trieste, Italy	15,000	Clay	(Italy) Martina Caregaro	(Italy) Alice Balducci (Italy) Camilla Scala	5–7, 7–5, [10–1]
Loss	6–10	Dec 2017	ITF Antalya, Turkey	15,000	Clay	(Bulgaria) Dia Evtimova	(Romania) Cristina Dinu (Finland) Mia Eklund	3–6, 2–6
Win	7–10	Jul 2018	ITF Baja, Hungary	25,000	Clay	(Serbia) Natalija Kostić	(Romania) Nicoleta Dascalu (Bulgaria) Isabella Shinikova	w/o
Win	8–10	Oct 2018	ITF Seville, Spain	25,000	Clay	(Venezuela) Andrea Gámiz	(Turkey) Başak Eraydın (Russia) Anastasiya Komardina	7–5, 7–6^{(5)}
Win	9–10	Sep 2019	Zagreb Ladies Open, Croatia	60,000	Clay	(Hungary) Anna Bondár	(France) Amandine Hesse (Chile) Daniela Seguel	7–5, 7–5
Loss	9–11	Jan 2020	ITF Daytona Beach, United States	25,000	Clay	(India) Prarthana Thombare	(Hungary) Dalma Gálfi (Belgium) Kimberley Zimmermann	6–7^{(4)}, 2–6
Loss	9–12	Sep 2020	ITF Tarvisio, Italy	25,000	Clay	(Hungary) Anna Bondár	(Belgium) Marie Benoît (Romania) Alexandra Cadanțu	1–6, 3–6
Loss	9–13	Jun 2021	ITF Denain, France	25,000	Clay	(Hungary) Dalma Gálfi	(Kazakhstan) Anna Danilina (Ukraine) Valeriya Strakhova	5–7, 6–3, [4–10]
Loss	9–14	Oct 2021	ITF Lisbon, Portugal	25,000	Clay	(Serbia) Natalija Stevanović	(Spain) Yvonne Cavallé Reimers (Spain) Ángela Fita Boluda	6–3, 3–6, [4–10]
Loss	9–15	Feb 2022	ITF Tucumán, Argentina	25,000	Clay	(Venezuela) Andrea Gámiz	(Chile) Bárbara Gatica (Brazil) Rebeca Pereira	3–6, 5–7
Win	10–15	Jun 2026	ITF San Gregorio, Italy	W35	Clay	(Italy) Anastasia Abbagnato	(Belgium) Ema Kovacevic (Italy) Carolina Troiano	6–3, 6–7^{(3)}, [10–7]

== National team participation ==
=== Fed Cup/Billie Jean King Cup ===
==== Singles (12–10) ====
Edition	Round	Date	Location	Surface	Against	Opponent	W/L	Score
2010	WG2	Feb 2010	Tallinn (EST)	Hard (i)	Estonia	Kaia Kanepi	L	1–6, 5–7
2010	WG2	Feb 2010	Tallinn (EST)	Hard (i)	Estonia	Maret Ani	L	2–6, 3–6
2010	WG2 PO	Apr 2010	Montreal (CAN)	Carpet (i)	Canada	Aleksandra Wozniak	L	4–6, 2–6
2010	WG2 PO	Apr 2010	Montreal (CAN)	Carpet (i)	Canada	Valérie Tétreault	L	7–6^{(6)}, 1–6, 1–6
2012	Z1 RR	Feb 2012	Curitiba (BRA)	Clay	(The Bahamas) Bahamas	Larikah Russell	W	6–3, 6–0
2012	Z1 RR	Feb 2012	Curitiba (BRA)	Clay	Canada	Aleksandra Wozniak	W	7–5, 6–4
2012	Z1 RR	Feb 2012	Curitiba (BRA)	Clay	Peru	Ferny Ángeles Paz	W	6–1, 6–0
2012	Z1 RR	Feb 2012	Curitiba (BRA)	Clay	Colombia	Catalina Castaño	W	6–2, 6–4
2012	WG2 PO	Apr 2012	Buenos Aires (ARG)	Clay	China	Yi-Miao Zhou	W	6–2, 6–2
2012	WG2 PO	Apr 2012	Buenos Aires (ARG)	Clay	China	Qiang Wang	W	6–4, 6–2
2013	WG2	Feb 2013	Buenos Aires (ARG)	Clay	Sweden	Johanna Larsson	W	6–3, 6–0
2013	WG2	Feb 2013	Buenos Aires (ARG)	Clay	Sweden	Sofia Arvidsson	L	5–7, 7–6^{(6)}, 2–3 ret.
2013	WG2 PO	Apr 2013	Buenos Aires (ARG)	Clay	(United Kingdom) Great Britain	Johanna Konta	W	6–3, 6–2
2013	WG2 PO	Apr 2013	Buenos Aires (ARG)	Clay	(United Kingdom) Great Britain	Laura Robson	W	6–4, 4–6, 6–2
2014	WG2	Feb 2014	Pilar (ARG)	Clay	Japan	Misaki Doi	W	6–2, 3–6, 6–3
2014	WG2	Feb 2014	Pilar (ARG)	Clay	Japan	Kurumi Nara	W	6–3, 6–4
2014	WG PO	Apr 2014	Sochi (RUS)	Clay	Russia	Elena Vesnina	L	3–6, 3–6
2014	WG PO	Apr 2014	Sochi (RUS)	Clay	Russia	Ekaterina Makarova	L	1–6, 2–6
2015	WG2	Feb 2015	Buenos Aires (ARG)	Clay	United States	Venus Williams	L	3–6, 2–6
2015	WG2	Feb 2015	Buenos Aires (ARG)	Clay	United States	CoCo Vandeweghe	W	6–4, 6–4
2015	WG2 PO	Apr 2015	Buenos Aires (ARG)	Clay	Spain	Sara Sorribes Tormo	L	6–4, 6–7^{(2)}, 1–6
2015	WG2 PO	Apr 2015	Buenos Aires (ARG)	Clay	Spain	Lara Arruabarrena	L	1–6, 6–4, 7–9

==== Doubles (0–2) ====
Edition	Round	Date	Location	Against	Surface	Partner	Opponents	W/L	Score
2009	WG PO	Apr 2009	Mar del Plata (ARG)	Ukraine	Hard	María Irigoyen	Mariya Koryttseva; Olga Savchuk	L	6–2, 6–0
2014	WG2	Feb 2014	Pilar (ARG)	Japan	Clay	María Irigoyen	Shuko Aoyama; Risa Ozaki	L	6–0, 6–4
