= 2012 The Bahamas Women's Open =

- Date: 12 – 18 March
- Edition: 2nd
- Location: Nassau, Bahamas

Champions

Singles
- (Canada) Aleksandra Wozniak

Doubles
- (Slovakia) Janette Husárová / (Hungary) Katalin Marosi
- The Bahamas Women's Open

The 2012 The Bahamas Women's Open is a professional tennis tournament played on Hard courts. It is the second edition of the tournament which is part of the 2012 ITF Women's Circuit. It took place in Nassau, Bahamas between 12 and 18 March 2012. It offered the prize of US$ 100,000.

== WTA entrants ==
=== Seeds ===
Country	Player	Rank^{1}	Seed
FRA	Pauline Parmentier	60	1
UKR	Kateryna Bondarenko	72	2
GBR	Anne Keothavong	77	3
POL	Urszula Radwańska	85	4
CAN	Aleksandra Wozniak	86	5
CAN	Stéphanie Dubois	91	6
FRA	Virginie Razzano	92	7
LUX	Mandy Minella	93	8

- ^{1} Rankings are as of March 9, 2012.

=== Other entrants ===
The following players received wildcards into the singles main draw:

- (United States) Ryann Foster
- (The Bahamas) Simone Pratt
- (United States) Maria Sanchez
- (United States) Alexandra Stevenson

The following players received entry from the qualifying draw:

- (United States) Gail Brodsky
- (Japan) Rika Fujiwara
- (Czech Republic) Karolína Plíšková
- (United States) Coco Vandeweghe

== Champions ==
=== Singles ===
(Canada) Aleksandra Wozniak def. (France) Alizé Cornet, 6–4, 7–5

=== Doubles ===
(Slovakia) Janette Husárová / (Hungary) Katalin Marosi def. (Czech Republic) Eva Birnerová / (United Kingdom) Anne Keothavong, 6–1, 3–6, [10–6]
