= The Bahamas Women's Open =

Defunct tennis tournament
- Location: Nassau, Bahamas
- Venue: National Tennis Centre
- Category: ITF Women's Circuit
- Surface: Hard
- Draw: 32S/32Q/16D
- Prize money: $100,000+H
- Website: thebahamasopen.com

The Bahamas Women's Open was a professional tennis tournament played on outdoor hard courts. It was part of the International Tennis Federation (ITF) Women's Circuit. It was held at the National Tennis Centre in Nassau, Bahamas from 2011 to 2012.

== Past finals ==
=== Singles ===
Year	Champion	Runner-up	Score
2012	(Canada) Aleksandra Wozniak	(France) Alizé Cornet	6–4, 7–5
2011	(Belarus) Anastasiya Yakimova	(Germany) Angelique Kerber	6–3, 6–2

=== Doubles ===
Year	Champions	Runners-up	Score
2012	(Slovakia) Janette Husárová (Hungary) Katalin Marosi	(Czech Republic) Eva Birnerová (United Kingdom) Anne Keothavong	6–1, 3–6, [10–6]
2011	(South Africa) Natalie Grandin (Czech Republic) Vladimíra Uhlířová	(United States) Raquel Kops-Jones (United States) Abigail Spears	6–4, 6–2
