= Anastasiya Yakimova =

Belarusian tennis player

Anastasiya Yakimova Настасся Якімава
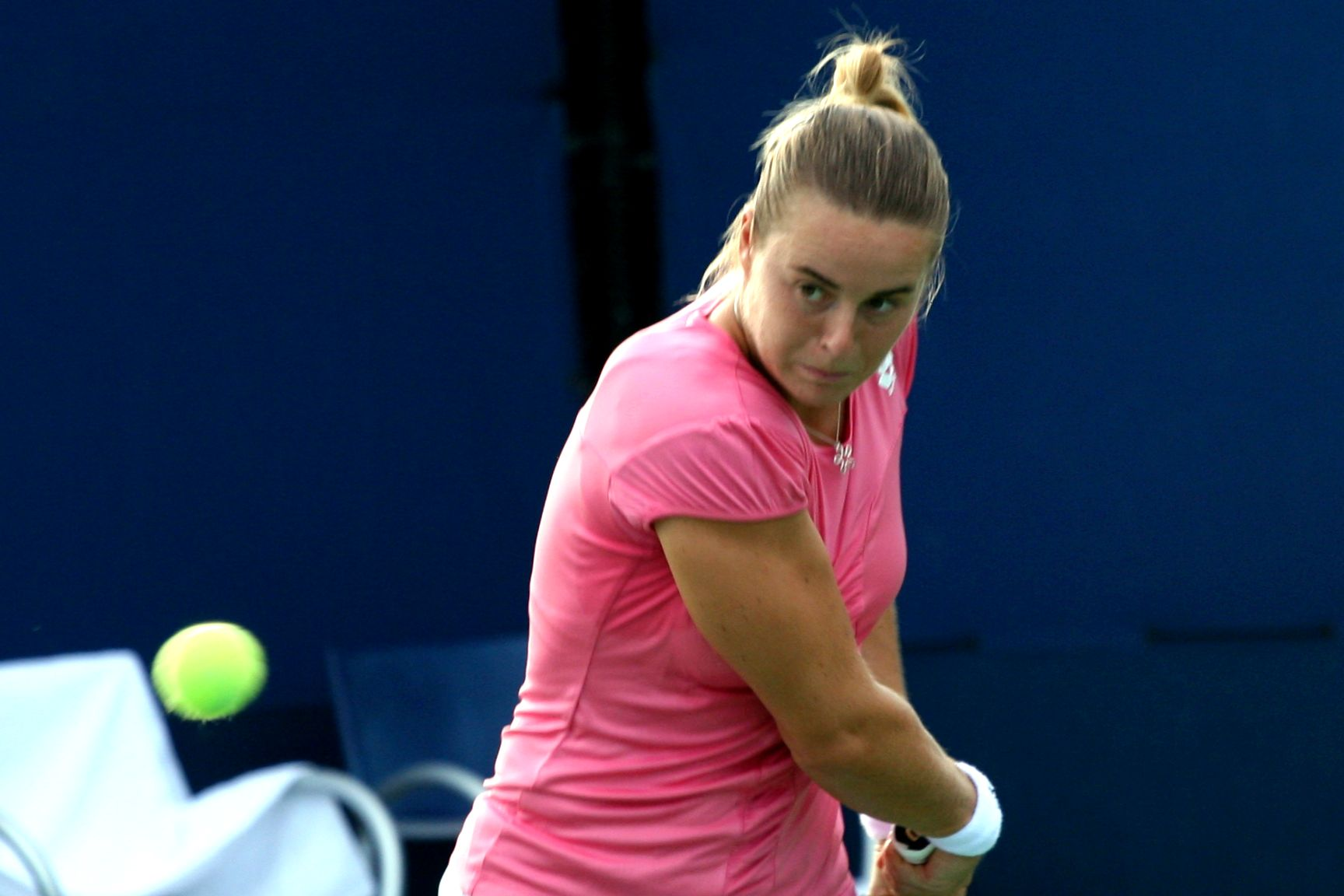
- Yakimova at the 2011 US Open
- Country (sports): Belarus
- Born: 1 November 1986 (age 40) Minsk, Soviet Union
- Height: 165 cm (5 ft 5 in)
- Turned pro: 2001
- Plays: Right (two-handed backhand)
- Prize money: $1,075,533

Singles
- Career record: 355–240
- Career titles: 0 WTA, 13 ITF
- Highest ranking: No. 49 (31 July 2006)

Grand Slam singles results
- Australian Open: 3R (2007)
- French Open: 2R (2006, 2008)
- Wimbledon: 2R (2011, 2012)
- US Open: 2R (2011)

Doubles
- Career record: 134–105
- Career titles: 2 WTA, 11 ITF
- Highest ranking: No. 67 (19 June 2006)

Team competitions
- Fed Cup: 10–13

Anastasiya Yakimova (Belarusian: Настасся Аляксееўна Якімава; Russian: Анастасия Алексеевна Екимова; born 1 November 1986) is a former tennis player from Belarus. She made it to the third round of the 2007 Australian Open, defeating Ai Sugiyama, a seeded player, on the way in the second round.

The last tournament on the ITF Women's Circuit she played in August 2017, in Las Palmas de Gran Canaria.

== Career ==
Yakimova began the year by qualifying for the 2009 Sydney International. She defeated Stéphanie Cohen-Aloro, Sophie Ferguson and Klára Zakopalová en route to qualifying. She faced Annabel Medina Garrigues in the first round and lost in three sets. She then headed to the Australian Open where she lost to Gisela Dulko, also in three sets. She played her first ITF tournament of the year at the $50k event in Cali, Colombia. As the fourth seed, Yakimova battled through to the final where she defeated Rossana de los Ríos to take her seventh ITF title.

She then qualified for both Indian Wells and Miami, two Premier Mandatory events. In Indian Wells, she defeated Varvara Lepchenko before falling to reigning champion Ana Ivanovic. In Miami, she beat fellow Olga Govortsova and then 13th seed Marion Bartoli to reach the third round. There she lost to Alisa Kleybanova.

At the 2009 Barcelona Ladies Open, Yakimova qualified and managed to make it to her first WTA Tour quarterfinal of the year. She defeated Sorana Cîrstea and Magdaléna Rybáriková, before falling to eventual champion, Roberta Vinci. She then played in the $50k Open Saint-Gaudens as the top seed. She made it to the final where she defeated Yanina Wickmayer for her second title of the year. Then, in Strasbourg she received main-draw entry without qualifying. She defeated Maret Ani in the first round, before falling to eventual finalist, Aravane Rezaï.

At the 2009 French Open, she was drawn against comeback player Maria Sharapova in the first round, losing in three sets.

In 2011, she won the $100k Bahamas Open.

== WTA Tour finals ==
=== Doubles: 3 (2 titles, 1 runner-up) ===
Before 2009	Starting in 2009
Tier III	Premier
Tier IV & V (2–0)	International (0–1)

Result	Date	Tournament	Surface	Partner	Opponents	Score
Win	May 2006	İstanbul Cup, Turkey	Clay	(Ukraine) Alona Bondarenko	(India) Sania Mirza (Australia) Alicia Molik	6–2, 6–4
Win	Oct 2007	Tashkent Open, Uzbekistan	Hard	(Belarus) Ekaterina Dzehalevich	(Belarus) Tatiana Poutchek (Australia) Anastasia Rodionova	2–6, 6–4, [10–7]
Loss	Feb 2010	Copa Colsanitas, Colombia	Clay	(Ukraine) Olga Savchuk	(Argentina) Gisela Dulko (Romania) Edina Gallovits-Hall	2–6, 6–7^{(8)}

== ITF Circuit finals ==
Legend
$100,000 tournaments
$75,000 tournaments
$50,000 tournaments
$25,000 tournaments
$10,000 tournaments

=== Singles: 25 (13–12) ===
Result	No.	Date	Tournament	Surface	Opponent	Score
Loss	1.	Oct 2002	ITF Minsk, Belarus	Carpet (i)	(Israel) Evgenia Linetskaya	2–6, 1–6
Win	1.	Feb 2003	ITF Vale do Lobo, Portugal	Hard	(Germany) Caroline-Ann Basu	6–3, 6–1
Loss	2.	Jul 2003	Bella Cup, Poland	Clay	(Poland) Marta Domachowska	5–7, 6–3, 4–6
Win	2.	Mar 2004	ITF St. Petersburg, Russia	Carpet (i)	(Finland) Emma Laine	3–6, 6–2, 6–1
Loss	3.	Aug 2004	ITF Balashikha, Russia	Clay	(Austria) Yvonne Meusburger	3–6, 7–6, 0–6
Loss	4.	Oct 2004	ITF Minsk, Belarus	Carpet (i)	(Ukraine) Olga Savchuk	4–6, 4–6
Win	3.	Nov 2004	ITF Poitiers, France	Carpet (i)	(Switzerland) Marie-Gaïané Mikaelian	7–5, 6–2
Win	4.	Oct 2005	Batumi Ladies Open, Georgia	Hard	(Serbia) Ana Timotić	6–4, 6–1
Loss	5.	Apr 2006	Open de Cagnes-sur-Mer, France	Clay	(Germany) Martina Müller	6–7, 6–2, 0–6
Loss	6.	May 2006	ITF Jounieh Open, Lebanon	Clay	(Tunisia) Selima Sfar	4–6, 5–7
Loss	7.	Sep 2007	Open Denain, France	Clay	(France) Olivia Sanchez	2–6, 6–1, 1–6
Win	5.	Jul 2008	ITF Mont-de-Marsan, France	Clay	(Greece) Anna Gerasimou	6–3, 1–6, 6–4
Loss	8.	Oct 2008	ITF Jounieh Open, Lebanon	Clay	(Romania) Irina-Camelia Begu	2–6, 0–6
Win	6.	Nov 2008	ITF Phoenix, Mauritius	Hard	(Austria) Patricia Mayr-Achleitner	3–6, 6–2, 1–0 ret.
Win	7.	Feb 2009	ITF Cali, Colombia	Clay	(Paraguay) Rossana de los Ríos	6–3, 6–0
Win	8.	May 2009	Open Saint-Gaudens, France	Clay	(Belgium) Yanina Wickmayer	7–5, 7–6^{(0)}
Win	9.	Aug 2009	ITF Astana, Kazakhstan	Hard	(Austria) Nikola Hofmanova	6–0, 6–4
Win	10.	Apr 2010	ITF Monzón, Spain	Hard	(Slovakia) Zuzana Kučová	6–4, 4–6, 6–3
Loss	9.	Apr 2010	ITF Dothan Classic, United States	Clay	(Romania) Edina Gallovits-Hall	1–6, 4–6
Win	11.	Mar 2011	Bahamas Open	Hard	(Germany) Angelique Kerber	6–3, 6–2
Loss	10.	May 2011	ITF Reggio Emilia, Italy	Clay	(United States) Sloane Stephens	3–6, 1–6
Win	12.	Sep 2011	Ningbo Challenger, China	Hard	(Japan) Erika Sema	7–6^{(3)}, 6–3
Loss	11.	Apr 2012	ITF Les Franqueses del Vallès, Spain	Hard	(Belarus) Ksenia Milevskaya	5–7, 7–6^{(5)}, 4–6
Loss	12.	Apr 2012	ITF Vic, Spain	Clay	(Belarus) Ksenia Milevskaya	4–6, 2–6
Win	13.	Aug 2015	ITF Las Palmas, Spain	Clay	(Spain) Irene Burillo	6–1, 6–7^{(3)}, 6–2

=== Doubles: 18 (11–7) ===
Result	No.	Date	Tournament	Surface	Partner	Opponents	Score
Win	1.	Oct 2004	ITF Minsk, Belarus	Carpet (i)	(Belarus) Darya Kustova	(Russia) Irina Bulykina (Slovakia) Katarína Kachlíková	6–4, 6–0
Loss	1.	Aug 2005	Bronx Open, United States	Hard	(Belarus) Tatiana Poutchek	(China) Li Ting (China) Sun Tiantian	6–2, 2–6, 4–6
Win	2.	Sep 2005	ITF Jounieh Open, Lebanon	Clay	(Ukraine) Mariya Koryttseva	(Ukraine) Olena Antypina (Czech Republic) Hana Šromová	7–5, 6–2
Win	3.	Oct 2005	Batumi Ladies Open, Georgia	Hard	(Belarus) Nadejda Ostrovskaya	(Russia) Anna Bastrikova (Russia) Nina Bratchikova	2–6, 6–2, 7–6
Loss	2.	Jan 2006	ITF Ortisei, Italy	Carpet (i)	(Belarus) Tatiana Poutchek	(Czech Republic) Lucie Hradecká (Czech Republic) Vladimíra Uhlířová	4–6, 2–6
Win	4.	May 2006	ITF Jounieh Open, Lebanon	Clay	(Belarus) Tatiana Poutchek	(Argentina) María José Argeri (Brazil) Letícia Sobral	6–4, 7–6
Win	5.	May 2007	ITF Jounieh Open, Lebanon	Clay	(Belarus) Tatiana Poutchek	(Romania) Mădălina Gojnea (Romania) Monica Niculescu	7–5, 6–0
Win	6.	Jul 2007	ITF Pétange, Luxembourg	Clay	(Spain) Carla Suárez Navarro	(Germany) Martina Müller (Luxembourg) Claudine Schaul	6–7, 6–1, 7–6
Loss	3.	Nov 2007	ITF Deauville, France	Carpet (i)	(Uzbekistan) Akgul Amanmuradova	(Czech Republic) Renata Voráčová (Czech Republic) Barbora Záhlavová-Strýcová	3–6, 5–7
Win	7.	Mar 2008	ITF Patras, Greece	Clay	(Israel) Tzipora Obziler	(Spain) María José Martínez Sánchez (Spain) Arantxa Parra Santonja	7–5, 6–1
Loss	4.	Apr 2008	Open de Saint-Malo, France	Clay	(Czech Republic) Renata Voráčová	(Spain) María José Martínez Sánchez (Spain) Arantxa Parra Santonja	2–6, 1–6
Loss	5.	Sep 2008	Maribor Open, Slovenia	Clay	(Hungary) Kyra Nagy	(Germany) Carmen Klaschka (Germany) Andrea Petkovic	0–6, 6–2, [3–10]
Win	8.	Oct 2008	ITF Jounieh Open, Lebanon	Clay	(Netherlands) Chayenne Ewijk	(Germany) Carmen Klaschka (Germany) Laura Siegemund	7–5, 7–5
Loss	6.	Feb 2009	ITF Cali, Colombia	Clay	(Portugal) Frederica Piedade	(Argentina) Betina Jozami (Spain) Arantxa Parra Santonja	3–6, 1–6
Win	9.	Apr 2010	Dothan Tennis Classic, United States	Clay	(Russia) Alina Jidkova	(Argentina) María Irigoyen (Serbia) Teodora Mirčić	6–4, 6–2
Loss	7.	May 2010	Open Saint-Gaudens, France	Clay	(Ukraine) Olga Savchuk	(France) Claire Feuerstein (France) Stéphanie Foretz	2–6, 4–6
Win	10.	Feb 2011	ITF Stockholm, Sweden	Hard (i)	(Netherlands) Arantxa Rus	(France) Claire Feuerstein (Russia) Ksenia Lykina	6–3, 2–6, 6–4
Win	11.	Aug 2017	ITF Las Palmas, Spain	Clay	(Spain) Carlota Molina Megías	(Oman) Fatma Al-Nabhani (Spain) Arabela Fernández Rabener	6–4, 6–3

== Performance timelines ==
Key
W	F	SF	QF	#R	RR	Q#	DNQ	A	NH

(W) winner; (F) finalist; (SF) semifinalist; (QF) quarterfinalist; (#R) rounds 4, 3, 2, 1; (RR) round-robin stage; (Q#) qualification round; (DNQ) did not qualify; (A) absent; (NH) not held; (SR) strike rate (events won / competed); (W–L) win–loss record.

=== Singles ===
Tournament	2001	2002	2003	2004	2005	2006	2007	2008	2009	2010	2011	2012	SR	W–L
Grand Slam tournaments
Australian Open	A	A	A	A	1R	1R	3R	QR	1R	1R	Q1	1R	0 / 6	2–6
French Open	A	A	A	Q1	1R	2R	1R	2R	1R	Q2	1R	1R	0 / 7	2–7
Wimbledon	A	A	A	Q1	Q2	1R	1R	QR	1R	1R	2R	2R	0 / 6	2–6
US Open	A	A	A	A	QR	1R	Q1	Q1	1R	Q2	2R	Q1	0 / 3	1–3
Win–Loss	0–0	0–0	0–0	0–0	0–2	1–4	2–3	1–1	0–4	0–2	2–3	1–3	0 / 22	7–22
Premier Mandatory tournaments
Indian Wells	A	A	A	A	1R	2R	1R	A	2R	Q1	Q1	1R	0 / 5	2–5
Miami	A	A	A	A	QR	2R	2R	A	3R	Q1	2R	1R	0 / 5	5–5
Madrid	not held								A	A	A	A	0 / 0	0–0
Beijing	not held			not Tier I					A	A	A	A	0 / 0	0–0
Premier 5 tournaments
Dubai	not Tier I								A	A	A	Q1	0 / 0	0–0
Doha	not Tier I							A	not held		nP5	1R	0 / 1	0–1
Rome	A	A	A	A	A	A	A	A	A	A	A	A	0 / 0	0–0
Canada	A	A	A	A	A	A	A	A	A	A	A	A	0 / 0	0–0
Cincinnati	not held			not Tier I					A	A	A	A	0 / 0	0–0
Tokyo	A	A	A	A	A	A	A	A	A	A	1R	A	0 / 1	0–1
Career statistics
Tournaments	0	1	11	17	25	24	25	28	22	31	31	23	Total: 238	
Titles	0	0	0	0	0	0	0	0	0	0	0	0	0	
Finals	0	0	0	0	0	0	0	0	0	0	0	0	0	
Overall win–loss	0–0	4–1	26–11	37–17	36–25	39–24	24–26	44–26	36–20	36–30	42–29	23–24	0 / 238	339–233
Year-end ranking	–	–	288	177	101	69	121	113	98	121	62	253	$1,075,533	

=== Doubles ===
Tournament	2005	2006	2011	2012	SR	W–L
Australian Open	A	A	A	1R	0 / 6	0–1
French Open	A	1R	A	1R	0 / 2	0–2
Wimbledon	1R	1R	A	Q1	0 / 2	0–2
US Open	A	2R	1R	A	0 / 2	1–2
Win–Loss	0–1	1–3	0–1	0–2	0 / 7	1–7
