= 2011 Internazionali Femminili di Palermo – Singles qualifying =

This article displays the qualifying draw of the 2011 Internazionali Femminili di Palermo.

== Players ==
=== Seeds ===
1. (Spain) Lara Arruabarrena-Vecino (qualifying competition) (lucky loser)
2. (Croatia) Ajla Tomljanović (second round)
3. (France) Laura Thorpe (second round)
4. (Romania) Liana Ungur (first round)
5. (France) Kristina Mladenovic (second round)
6. (Kazakhstan) Sesil Karatantcheva (qualified)
7. (Italy) Karin Knapp (qualified)
8. (Spain) Beatriz García Vidagany (first round)

=== Qualifiers ===
1. (Kazakhstan) Sesil Karatantcheva
2. (Croatia) Ani Mijačika
3. (Italy) Karin Knapp
4. (Russia) Elena Bovina

=== Lucky losers ===
1. (Spain) Lara Arruabarrena-Vecino

== Qualifying draw ==
=== First qualifier ===
First round
(Poland) Katarzyna Piter	6	6
(Greece) Stamatia Fafaliou	2	2
WC	(Australia) Marisa Gianotti	5	5
WC	(France) Sophie Lefèvre	7	7
WC	(Hungary) Vanda Lukács	3	4
6	(Kazakhstan) Sesil Karatantcheva	6	6

Second round
1	(Spain) Lara Arruabarrena-Vecino	1	6	6
(Poland) Katarzyna Piter	6	1	4
WC	(France) Sophie Lefèvre	0	3
6	(Kazakhstan) Sesil Karatantcheva	6	6

Qualifying competition
1	(Spain) Lara Arruabarrena-Vecino	5	3
6	(Kazakhstan) Sesil Karatantcheva	7	6

=== Second qualifier ===
First round
(Italy) Anna Remondina	5	6	3
(Croatia) Ani Mijačika	7	4	6
(Italy) Claudia Giovine	6	6
WC	(Italy) Vincenza Ciraola	0	0
(Italy) Gioia Barbieri	5	6	7^{7}
8	(Spain) Beatriz García Vidagany	7	2	6^{3}

Second round
2	(Croatia) Ajla Tomljanović	2	7^{7}	2
(Croatia) Ani Mijačika	6	6^{3}	6
(Italy) Claudia Giovine	6	1	6
(Italy) Gioia Barbieri	2	6	4

Qualifying competition
(Croatia) Ani Mijačika	6	6
(Italy) Claudia Giovine	4	3

=== Third qualifier ===
First round
(Serbia) Teodora Mirčić	6	3	6
WC	(Italy) Camilla Rosatello	3	6	0
(Italy) Nastassya Burnett	4	6	6
WC	(Italy) Carolina Pillot	6	4	3
(Latvia) Līga Dekmeijere	0	2
7	(Italy) Karin Knapp	6	6

Second round
3	(France) Laura Thorpe	1	6	5
(Serbia) Teodora Mirčić	6	4	7
(Italy) Nastassya Burnett	2	1
7	(Italy) Karin Knapp	6	6

Qualifying competition
(Serbia) Teodora Mirčić	1	6	6^{5}
7	(Italy) Karin Knapp	6	3	7^{7}

=== Fourth qualifier ===
First round
4	(Romania) Liana Ungur	1	4
(Spain) Eva Fernández-Brugués	6	6
(Russia) Elena Bovina	6^{4}	6	6
(Croatia) Darija Jurak	7^{7}	1	1
(Slovenia) Andreja Klepač	5	5
(France) Alizé Lim	7	7
WC	(Russia) Maria Kondratieva	2	4
5	(France) Kristina Mladenovic	6	6

Second round
(Spain) Eva Fernández-Brugués	6^{4}	6	2
(Russia) Elena Bovina	7^{7}	2	6
(France) Alizé Lim	3	6	6
5	(France) Kristina Mladenovic	6	4	4

Qualifying competition
(Russia) Elena Bovina	6	6
(France) Alizé Lim	1	3
