= 2012 Internazionali Femminili di Palermo – Singles =

Singles
- 2012 Internazionali Femminili di Palermo

Final
- Champion: (Italy) Sara Errani
- Runner-up: (Czech Republic) Barbora Záhlavová-Strýcová
- Score: 6–1, 6–3

Details
- Draw: 32
- Seeds: 8

Events
Singles	Doubles
← 2011 ·	Internazionali Femminili di Palermo	· 2013 →

Anabel Medina Garrigues was the defending champion, but lost to Maria Elena Camerin in the first round.

Top seed Sara Errani won the title by beating Barbora Záhlavová-Strýcová 6–1, 6–3 in the final. She did not drop a set the entire tournament.

== Seeds ==
1. (Italy) Sara Errani (champion)
2. (Italy) Roberta Vinci (second round)
3. (Germany) Julia Görges (quarterfinals)
4. (Spain) Anabel Medina Garrigues (first round)
5. (Spain) Carla Suárez Navarro (quarterfinals)
6. (Slovenia) Polona Hercog (first round)
7. (France) Alizé Cornet (second round)
8. (Czech Republic) Barbora Záhlavová-Strýcová (final)

== Draw ==
=== Key ===
- Q = Qualifier
- WC = Wild card
- LL = Lucky loser
- Alt = Alternate
- SE = Special exempt
- PR = Protected ranking
- ITF = ITF entry
- JE = Junior exempt
- w/o = Walkover
- r = Retired
- d = Defaulted
- SR = Special ranking

=== Finals ===
Semifinals
1	(Italy) Sara Errani	6	6
(Romania) Irina-Camelia Begu	4	1
8	(Czech Republic) Barbora Záhlavová-Strýcová	2	7	6
(United Kingdom) Laura Robson	6	5	2

Final
1	(Italy) Sara Errani	6	6
8	(Czech Republic) Barbora Záhlavová-Strýcová	1	3

=== Top half ===
First round
1	(Italy) S Errani	6	6
(Romania) E Gallovits-Hall	1	1
WC	(Italy) N Burnett	3	4
(Austria) P Mayr-Achleitner	6	6
(Romania) A Cadanțu	6	6
(Netherlands) K Bertens	3	2
(Colombia) M Duque-Mariño	3	2
7	(France) A Cornet	6	6
4	(Spain) A Medina Garrigues	1	3
WC	(Italy) ME Camerin	6	6
Q	(Spain) E Cabeza Candela	6	3	6
WC	(Italy) A Grymalska	2	6	1
(Kazakhstan) Y Putintseva	2	4
(Spain) L Domínguez Lino	6	6
(Romania) I-C Begu	6	7^{10}
6	(Slovenia) P Hercog	1	6^{8}

Second round
1	(Italy) S Errani	6	6
(Austria) P Mayr-Achleitner	3	2
(Romania) A Cadanțu	6	5	6
7	(France) A Cornet	3	7	2
WC	(Italy) ME Camerin	6^{3}	5
Q	(Spain) E Cabeza Candela	7^{7}	7
(Spain) L Domínguez Lino	6	1	4
(Romania) I-C Begu	3	6	6

Quarterfinals
1	(Italy) S Errani	6	6
(Romania) A Cadanțu	2	2
Q	(Spain) E Cabeza Candela	7	4	4
(Romania) I-C Begu	5	6	6

Semifinals
1	(Italy) S Errani	6	6
(Romania) I-C Begu	4	1

=== Bottom half ===
First round
8	(Czech Republic) B Záhlavová-Strýcová	7	7^{7}
(Spain) S Soler Espinosa	5	6^{3}
(United States) J Cohen	6	4	7
(Russia) V Dushevina	4	6	5
Q	(Hungary) K Marosi	6	6
(Russia) V Savinykh	4	3
(Uzbekistan) A Amanmuradova	4	6^{8}
3	(Germany) J Görges	6	7^{10}
5	(Spain) C Suárez Navarro	6	6
LL	(Australia) S Jones	4	1
(Georgia (country)) A Tatishvili	6	6
Q	(Bulgaria) D Evtimova	2	2
(United Kingdom) L Robson	6	6
Q	(Ukraine) V Ivakhnenko	1	0
(Italy) K Knapp	2	2
2	(Italy) R Vinci	6	6

Second round
8	(Czech Republic) B Záhlavová-Strýcová	3	6	7
(United States) J Cohen	6	3	5
Q	(Hungary) K Marosi
3	(Germany) J Görges	w/o
5	(Spain) C Suárez Navarro	6	3
(Georgia (country)) A Tatishvili	1	2^{r}
(United Kingdom) L Robson	6	7
2	(Italy) R Vinci	3	5

Quarterfinals
8	(Czech Republic) B Záhlavová-Strýcová	7^{7}	6^{4}	6
3	(Germany) J Görges	6^{4}	7^{7}	1
5	(Spain) C Suárez Navarro	4	6	4
(United Kingdom) L Robson	6	2	6

Semifinals
8	(Czech Republic) B Záhlavová-Strýcová	2	7	6
(United Kingdom) L Robson	6	5	2

== Qualifying ==
=== Seeds ===
1. (Spain) Estrella Cabeza Candela (qualified)
2. (Bulgaria) Dia Evtimova (qualified)
3. (Russia) Olga Puchkova (second round)
4. (Belgium) Tamaryn Hendler (first round)
5. (Slovenia) Petra Rampre (first round)
6. (Romania) Mădălina Gojnea (second round)
7. (Australia) Sacha Jones (qualifying competition, lucky loser)
8. (Croatia) Tereza Mrdeža (qualifying competition)

=== Qualifiers ===
1. (Spain) Estrella Cabeza Candela
2. (Bulgaria) Dia Evtimova
3. (Hungary) Katalin Marosi
4. (Ukraine) Valentyna Ivakhnenko

=== Lucky losers ===
- (Australia) Sacha Jones

=== Draw ===
==== First qualifier ====
First round
1	(Spain) Estrella Cabeza Candela	6	6
(Italy) Claudia Giovine	1	2
WC	(Italy) Francesca Brancato	0	1
(Greece) Maria Sakkari	6	6
(Australia) Stephanie Bengson	6	1	2
WC	(Italy) Carolina Pillot	4	6	6
(Slovenia) Nastja Kolar	4	2
6	(Romania) Mădălina Gojnea	6	6

Second round
1	(Spain) Estrella Cabeza Candela	6	6
(Greece) Maria Sakkari	0	1
WC	(Italy) Carolina Pillot	6	7
6	(Romania) Mădălina Gojnea	3	5

Qualifying competition
1	(Spain) Estrella Cabeza Candela	6	2	6
WC	(Italy) Carolina Pillot	1	6	0

==== Second qualifier ====
First round
2	(Bulgaria) Dia Evtimova	6	6
(Russia) Marina Shamayko	4	4
(Croatia) Darija Jurak	1	6	3
(Czech Republic) Renata Voráčová	6	4	6
WC	(Italy) Camilla Rosatello	5	5
(Hungary) Vanda Lukács	7	7
WC	(Italy) Aleda Rinciari	1	2
7	(Australia) Sacha Jones	6	6

Second round
2	(Bulgaria) Dia Evtimova	6	2	6
(Czech Republic) Renata Voráčová	2	6	4
(Hungary) Vanda Lukács	6	1	2
7	(Australia) Sacha Jones	2	6	6

Qualifying competition
2	(Bulgaria) Dia Evtimova	6	6
7	(Australia) Sacha Jones	4	4

==== Third qualifier ====
First round
3	(Russia) Olga Puchkova	6	3	6
(Italy) Anna Remondina	3	6	0
(Hungary) Katalin Marosi	3	6	6
(Italy) Giulia Gatto-Monticone	6	3	4
(Spain) Beatriz García Vidagany	6	6
WC	(Belarus) Ekaterina Dzehalevich	4	2
(Italy) Nicole Clerico	2	2
8	(Croatia) Tereza Mrdeža	6	6

Second round
3	(Russia) Olga Puchkova	6	2	3
(Hungary) Katalin Marosi	1	6	6
(Spain) Beatriz García Vidagany	3	1
8	(Croatia) Tereza Mrdeža	6	6

Qualifying competition
(Hungary) Katalin Marosi	7^{7}	3	7^{7}
8	(Croatia) Tereza Mrdeža	6^{5}	6	6^{5}

==== Fourth qualifier ====
First round
4	(Belgium) Tamaryn Hendler	6^{5}	4
(Colombia) Catalina Castaño	7^{7}	6
WC	(Italy) Corinna Dentoni	6	6
(Lithuania) Lina Stančiūtė	4	2
(Bosnia and Herzegovina) Jasmina Tinjić	1	4
(Serbia) Teodora Mirčić	6	6
(Ukraine) Valentyna Ivakhnenko	6	6
5	(Slovenia) Petra Rampre	1	1

Second round
(Colombia) Catalina Castaño	6	6
WC	(Italy) Corinna Dentoni	3	0
(Serbia) Teodora Mirčić	3	4
(Ukraine) Valentyna Ivakhnenko	6	6

Qualifying competition
(Colombia) Catalina Castaño	6	2	3
(Ukraine) Valentyna Ivakhnenko	3	6	6
