= 2013 Internazionali Femminili di Palermo – Doubles =

Doubles
- 2013 Internazionali Femminili di Palermo

Final
- Champions: (France) Kristina Mladenovic (Poland) Katarzyna Piter
- Runners-up: (Czech Republic) Karolína Plíšková (Czech Republic) Kristýna Plíšková
- Score: 6–1, 5–7, [10–8]

Details
- Draw: 16
- Seeds: 4

Events
Singles	Doubles
← 2012 ·	Internazionali Femminili di Palermo	· 2019 →

Renata Voráčová and Barbora Záhlavová-Strýcová were the defending champions, but they lost in the semifinals to Karolína Plíšková and Kristýna Plíšková.
Kristina Mladenovic and Katarzyna Piter won the title, defeating the Plíšková sisters in the final, 6–1, 5–7, [10–8].

== Seeds ==
1. (France) Kristina Mladenovic / (Poland) Katarzyna Piter (champions)
2. (Slovakia) Janette Husárová / (Spain) Silvia Soler Espinosa (first round)
3. (Czech Republic) Renata Voráčová / (Czech Republic) Barbora Záhlavová-Strýcová (semifinals)
4. (Croatia) Mirjana Lučić-Baroni / (Czech Republic) Klára Zakopalová (first round)

== Draw ==
=== Key ===
- Q = Qualifier
- WC = Wild card
- LL = Lucky loser
- Alt = Alternate
- SE = Special exempt
- PR = Protected ranking
- ITF = ITF entry
- JE = Junior exempt
- w/o = Walkover
- r = Retired
- d = Defaulted
- SR = Special ranking

=== Draw ===
First round
1	(France) K Mladenovic (Poland) K Piter	6	6
WC	(Italy) C Dentoni (Italy) A Grymalska	4	3
(Spain) L Domínguez Lino (Spain) A Parra Santonja	6	6
(Russia) M Melnikova (Serbia) T Mirčić	4	3
4	(Croatia) M Lučić-Baroni (Czech Republic) K Zakopalová	4	3
WC	(Italy) K Knapp (Italy) F Pennetta	6	6
(France) C Garcia (Ukraine) M Zanevska	6	6
(Italy) N Clerico (Switzerland) A Sadiković	3	1
(Czech Republic) E Birnerová (Ukraine) I Buryachok	6	7^{8}
(United States) J Cohen (Belarus) A Sasnovich	1	6^{6}
(Romania) A Dulgheru (Spain) I Ferrer Suárez	1	7^{7}	[6]
3	(Czech Republic) R Voráčová (Czech Republic) B Záhlavová-Strýcová	6	6^{4}	[10]
(Germany) K Barrois (Austria) N Rottmann	1	4
(Colombia) M Duque Mariño (Brazil) T Pereira	6	6
(Czech Republic) Ka Plíšková (Czech Republic) Kr Plíšková	6^{5}	6	[10]
2	(Slovakia) J Husárová (Spain) S Soler Espinosa	7^{7}	2	[8]

Quarterfinals
1	(France) K Mladenovic (Poland) K Piter	6	6
(Spain) L Domínguez Lino (Spain) A Parra Santonja	3	1
WC	(Italy) K Knapp (Italy) F Pennetta	6^{8}	6^{4}
(France) C Garcia (Ukraine) M Zanevska	7^{10}	7^{7}
(Czech Republic) E Birnerová (Ukraine) I Buryachok	0	2
3	(Czech Republic) R Voráčová (Czech Republic) B Záhlavová-Strýcová	6	6
(Colombia) M Duque Mariño (Brazil) T Pereira	3	7^{7}	[10]
(Czech Republic) Ka Plíšková (Czech Republic) Kr Plíšková	6	6^{1}	[12]

Semifinals
1	(France) K Mladenovic (Poland) K Piter	6	2	[10]
(France) C Garcia (Ukraine) M Zanevska	1	6	[5]
3	(Czech Republic) R Voráčová (Czech Republic) B Záhlavová-Strýcová	7	5	[8]
(Czech Republic) Ka Plíšková (Czech Republic) Kr Plíšková	5	7	[10]

Final
1	(France) K Mladenovic (Poland) K Piter	6	5	[10]
(Czech Republic) Ka Plíšková (Czech Republic) Kr Plíšková	1	7	[8]
