= 2011 Internazionali Femminili di Palermo – Singles =

Singles
- 2011 Internazionali Femminili di Palermo

Final
- Champion: (Spain) Anabel Medina Garrigues
- Runner-up: (Slovenia) Polona Hercog
- Score: 6–3, 6–2

Details
- Draw: 32
- Seeds: 8

Events
| Singles | Doubles |
- Internazionali Femminili di Palermo

Kaia Kanepi was the defending champion, but decided not to participate.

5th seed Anabel Medina Garrigues defeated 7th seed Polona Hercog in the final, 6–3, 6–2.

== Seeds ==
1. (Italy) Flavia Pennetta (semifinals)
2. (Italy) Roberta Vinci (second round)
3. (Italy) Sara Errani (quarterfinals)
4. (Czech Republic) Klára Zakopalová (quarterfinals)
5. (Spain) Anabel Medina Garrigues (champion)
6. (Bulgaria) Tsvetana Pironkova (quarterfinals)
7. (Slovenia) Polona Hercog (final)
8. (Czech Republic) Petra Cetkovská (semifinals)

== Draw ==
Key

- Q = Qualifier
- WC = Wild card
- LL = Lucky loser
- Alt = Alternate
- ITF = ITF entry
- PR = Protected ranking
- SR = Special ranking
- SE = Special exempt
- JE = Junior exempt
- JR = Junior Accelerator Programme entrant
- CO = College Accelerator Programme entrant
- NG = Next Gen Accelerator Program entrant
- w/o = Walkover
- r = Retired
- d = Defaulted

=== Finals ===
Semifinals
1 | (Italy) Flavia Pennetta | 2 | 2
7 | (Slovenia) Polona Hercog | 6 | 6
8 | (Czech Republic) Petra Cetkovská | 5 | 3
5 | (Spain) Anabel Medina Garrigues | 7 | 6

Final
7 | (Slovenia) Polona Hercog | 3 | 2
5 | (Spain) Anabel Medina Garrigues | 6 | 6

=== Top half ===
First round
1 | (Italy) F Pennetta | 6 | 6
WC | (Italy) A Grymalska | 4 | 1
(France) M Johansson | 7^{7} | 6
(France) A Rezaï | 6^{5} | 1
(Romania) S Cîrstea | 6 | 6
(Czech Republic) A Hlaváčková | 3 | 2
(Georgia (country)) A Tatishvili | 2 | 5
6 | (Bulgaria) T Pironkova | 6 | 7
4 | (Czech Republic) K Zakopalová | 0 | 6 | 6
(Russia) A Pivovarova | 6 | 1 | 1
(Greece) E Daniilidou | 6 | 3 | 3
Q | (Croatia) A Mijačika | 3 | 6 | 6
(Italy) A Brianti | 6 | 6
WC | (Italy) S Albano | 1 | 0
Q | (Italy) K Knapp | 7 | 4 | 2
7 | (Slovenia) P Hercog | 5 | 6 | 6

Second round
1 | (Italy) F Pennetta | 4 | 7 | 7
(France) M Johansson | 6 | 5 | 5
(Romania) S Cîrstea | 6 | 1 | 1
6 | (Bulgaria) T Pironkova | 2 | 6 | 6
4 | (Czech Republic) K Zakopalová | 7 | 4 | 6
Q | (Croatia) A Mijačika | 5 | 6 | 3
(Italy) A Brianti | 2 | 4
7 | (Slovenia) P Hercog | 6 | 6

Quarterfinals
1 | (Italy) F Pennetta | 6 | 6
6 | (Bulgaria) T Pironkova | 2 | 2
4 | (Czech Republic) K Zakopalová | 1 | 1
7 | (Slovenia) P Hercog | 6 | 6

Semifinals
1 | (Italy) F Pennetta | 2 | 2
7 | (Slovenia) P Hercog | 6 | 6

=== Bottom half ===
First round
8 | (Czech Republic) P Cetkovská | 6 | 7
Q | (Russia) E Bovina | 1 | 5
(Romania) M Gojnea | 6^{4} | 2
(Uzbekistan) A Amanmuradova | 7^{7} | 6
(France) P Parmentier | 6 | 3 | 6
(United States) J Craybas | 4 | 6 | 4
(Russia) R Kulikova | 1 | 3
3 | (Italy) S Errani | 6 | 6
5 | (Spain) A Medina Garrigues | 6 | 6
WC | (Italy) A Floris | 3 | 3
(Italy) C Dentoni | 3 | 6^{5}
LL | (Spain) L Arruabarrena-Vecino | 6 | 7^{7}
(Romania) I-C Begu | 6 | 7
(Italy) ME Camerin | 2 | 5
Q | (Kazakhstan) S Karatantcheva | 2 | 5
2 | (Italy) R Vinci | 6 | 7

Second round
8 | (Czech Republic) P Cetkovská | 6 | 6
(Uzbekistan) A Amanmuradova | 2 | 4
(France) P Parmentier | 5 | 1
3 | (Italy) S Errani | 7 | 6
5 | (Spain) A Medina Garrigues | 6 | 7
LL | (Spain) L Arruabarrena-Vecino | 1 | 5
(Romania) I-C Begu | 6 | 6
2 | (Italy) R Vinci | 4 | 3

Quarterfinals
8 | (Czech Republic) P Cetkovská | 5 | 6 | 7^{7}
3 | (Italy) S Errani | 7 | 3 | 6^{4}
5 | (Spain) A Medina Garrigues | 6 | 1 | 6
(Romania) I-C Begu | 2 | 6 | 0

Semifinals
8 | (Czech Republic) P Cetkovská | 5 | 3
5 | (Spain) A Medina Garrigues | 7 | 6
