= 2012 Goldwater Women's Tennis Classic =

- Date: November 5–11
- Edition: 4th
- Location: Phoenix, Arizona, United States

Champions

Singles
- (United States) Madison Keys

Doubles
- (United States) Jacqueline Cako / (United States) Natalie Pluskota
← 2011 ·	Goldwater Women's Tennis Classic

The 2012 Goldwater Women's Tennis Classic was a professional tennis tournament played on outdoor hard courts. It was the fourth edition of the tournament which was part of the 2012 ITF Women's Circuit. It took place in Phoenix, Arizona, on November 5–11, 2012.

== WTA entrants ==
=== Seeds ===
Country	Player	Rank^{1}	Seed
ITA	Camila Giorgi	79	1
KAZ	Sesil Karatantcheva	83	2
USA	Melanie Oudin	92	3
POR	Michelle Larcher de Brito	110	4
CRO	Mirjana Lučić	112	5
USA	Alexa Glatch	130	6
USA	Mallory Burdette	139	7
USA	Maria Sanchez	149	8

- ^{1} Rankings are as of October 29, 2012.

=== Other entrants ===
The following players received wildcards into the singles main draw:

- (United States) Victoria Duval
- (Netherlands) Jainy Scheepens
- (United States) Taylor Townsend
- (United States) Ashley Weinhold

The following players received entry from the qualifying draw:

- (United States) Jan Abaza
- (United States) Kristie Ahn
- (Canada) Gabriela Dabrowski
- (United States) Sachia Vickery

The following player received entry as a Lucky Loser:

- (Indonesia) Romana Tedjakusuma

== Champions ==
=== Singles ===
- (United States) Madison Keys def. (United States) Maria Sanchez, 6–3, 7–6^{(7–1)}.

=== Doubles ===
- (United States) Jacqueline Cako / (United States) Natalie Pluskota def. (Canada) Eugenie Bouchard / (Norway) Ulrikke Eikeri, 6–3, 2–6, [10–4]
