= 2011 Goldwater Women's Tennis Classic – Doubles =

Doubles
- 2011 Goldwater Women's Tennis Classic

Final
- Champions: (United States) Jamie Hampton (Croatia) Ajla Tomljanović
- Runners-up: (United States) Maria Sanchez (United States) Yasmin Schnack
- Score: 3–6, 6–3, [10–6]

Events
| Singles | Doubles |
| ← 2010 · | Goldwater Women's Tennis Classic | · 2012 → |

Tetiana Luzhanska and Coco Vandeweghe were the defending champions, but Luzhanska chose not to participate. Vandeweghe competed with Mashona Washington, but lost in the first round to Elizabeth Lumpkin and Ioana Raluca Olaru.

Jamie Hampton and Ajla Tomljanović won the title defeating Maria Sanchez and Yasmin Schnack in the final 3–6, 6–3, [10–6].

== Seeds ==
1. (United States) Lindsay Lee-Waters / (United States) Megan Moulton-Levy (semifinals)
2. (Russia) Elena Bovina / (Luxembourg) Mandy Minella (semifinals)
3. (United States) Coco Vandeweghe / (United States) Mashona Washington (first round)
4. (United States) Jamie Hampton / (Croatia) Ajla Tomljanović (champions)

== Draw ==
=== Key ===
- Q = Qualifier
- WC = Wild card
- LL = Lucky loser
- Alt = Alternate
- SE = Special exempt
- PR = Protected ranking
- ITF = ITF entry
- JE = Junior exempt
- w/o = Walkover
- r = Retired
- d = Defaulted
- SR = Special ranking

=== Draw ===
First round
1 | (United States) L Lee-Waters (United States) M Moulton-Levy | 6 | 6
(United States) G Brodsky (Kazakhstan) S Karatantcheva | 2 | 1
WC | (United States) J Elie (United States) D Starr | 6 | 6
WC | (United States) J Buterbaugh (United States) A Raines | 3 | 2
4 | (United States) J Hampton (Croatia) A Tomljanović | 6 | 6
(Belgium) T Hendler (United States) C Scholl | 2 | 2
(Canada) E Bouchard (United States) A Fink | 6 | 6^{3} | [13]
(United States) I Falconi (United States) A Weinhold | 3 | 7^{7} | [15]
(United States) M Harkins (Austria) N Rottmann | 2 | 2
(United States) M Sanchez (United States) Y Schnack | 6 | 6
(United States) E Lumpkin (Romania) IR Olaru | 6 | 6
3 | (United States) C Vandeweghe (United States) M Washington | 3 | 1
WC | (United States) S Rogers (United States) A Will | 6 | 4 | [5]
(United States) M Brengle (South Africa) C Simmonds | 3 | 6 | [10]
(United States) B Augustine (United States) W Jones | 0 | 4
2 | (Russia) E Bovina (Luxembourg) M Minella | 6 | 6

Quarterfinals
1 | (United States) L Lee-Waters (United States) M Moulton-Levy | 6 | 6
WC | (United States) J Elie (United States) D Starr | 3 | 0
4 | (United States) J Hampton (Croatia) A Tomljanović | 6 | 6
(United States) I Falconi (United States) A Weinhold | 2 | 3
(United States) M Sanchez (United States) Y Schnack | 6 | 3 | [10]
(United States) E Lumpkin (Romania) IR Olaru | 4 | 6 | [7]
(United States) M Brengle (South Africa) C Simmonds | 4 | 3
2 | (Russia) E Bovina (Luxembourg) M Minella | 6 | 6

Semifinals
1 | (United States) L Lee-Waters (United States) M Moulton-Levy | 6 | 6^{5} | [8]
4 | (United States) J Hampton (Croatia) A Tomljanović | 4 | 7^{7} | [10]
(United States) M Sanchez (United States) Y Schnack | 6^{3} | 6 | [10]
2 | (Russia) E Bovina (Luxembourg) M Minella | 7^{7} | 4 | [5]

Finals
4 | (United States) J Hampton (Croatia) A Tomljanović | 3 | 6 | [10]
(United States) M Sanchez (United States) Y Schnack | 6 | 3 | [6]
