= 2011 Saransk Cup – Singles =

Singles
- 2011 Saransk Cup

Final
- Champion: (Russia) Alexandra Panova
- Runner-up: (Russia) Marina Melnikova
- Score: 6–0, 6–2

Events
Singles	Doubles
← 2010 ·	Saransk Cup	· 2012 →

This was a new event to the 2011 ITF Women's Circuit.
Alexandra Panova won the title by defeating Marina Melnikova in the final 6–0, 6–2.

== Seeds ==
1. (Russia) Anastasia Pivovarova (quarterfinals)
2. (Russia) Alexandra Panova (champion)
3. (Romania) Mihaela Buzărnescu (semifinals)
4. (Turkey) Çağla Büyükakçay (first round)
5. (Russia) Valeria Solovieva (quarterfinals)
6. (Ukraine) Veronika Kapshay (semifinals)
7. (Ukraine) Valentyna Ivakhnenko (second round)
8. (Serbia) Teodora Mirčić (first round)

== Main draw ==
=== Key ===
- Q = Qualifier
- WC = Wild card
- LL = Lucky loser
- Alt = Alternate
- SE = Special exempt
- PR = Protected ranking
- ITF = ITF entry
- JE = Junior exempt
- w/o = Walkover
- r = Retired
- d = Defaulted
- SR = Special ranking

=== Finals ===
Semifinals
WC	(Russia) Marina Melnikova	6	6
6	(Ukraine) Veronika Kapshay	4	4
3	(Romania) Mihaela Buzărnescu	6^{6}	1
2	(Russia) Alexandra Panova	7^{8}	6

Final
WC	(Russia) Marina Melnikova	0	2
2	(Russia) Alexandra Panova	6	6

=== Top half ===
First round
1	(Russia) A Pivovarova	6	6
(Russia) A Artamonova	3	3
Q	(Russia) N Gorbachkova	6	2	5
(Russia) M Shamayko	3	6	7
WC	(Russia) M Melnikova	6	7
(Ukraine) K Kozlova	3	5
(Russia) A Gabueva	5	6	1
7	(Ukraine) V Ivakhnenko	7	3	6
4	(Turkey) Ç Büyükakçay	6^{6}	3
Q	(Russia) V Kan	7^{8}	6
(Russia) E Kulikova	6	6
(Ukraine) A Piven	3	0
(Russia) E Pashkova	3	2
WC	(Russia) K Lykina	6	6
(Russia) P Vinogradova	3	0
6	(Ukraine) V Kapshay	6	6

Second round
1	(Russia) A Pivovarova	3	6	6
(Russia) M Shamayko	6	1	3
WC	(Russia) M Melnikova	2	6	6
7	(Ukraine) V Ivakhnenko	6	2	3
Q	(Russia) V Kan	6	6
(Russia) E Kulikova	4	2
WC	(Russia) K Lykina	3	6	3
6	(Ukraine) V Kapshay	6	2	6

Quarterfinals
1	(Russia) A Pivovarova	4	3
WC	(Russia) M Melnikova	6	6
Q	(Russia) V Kan	2	4
6	(Ukraine) V Kapshay	6	6

Semifinals
WC	(Russia) M Melnikova	6	6
6	(Ukraine) V Kapshay	4	4

=== Bottom half ===
First round
5	(Russia) V Solovieva	6	6
Q	(Russia) P Rodionova	4	0
(Ukraine) Y Lysa	6	6
(Russia) M Zharkova	2	2
(Czech Republic) E Hrdinová	6	6
WC	(Russia) M Gasparyan	2	0
WC	(Russia) A Frolova	1	1
3	(Romania) M Buzărnescu	6	6
8	(Serbia) T Mirčić	6^{6}	5
(Ukraine) A Vasylyeva	7^{8}	7
(Ukraine) E Ianchuk	6	6
(Russia) A Mukhametova	2	4
(Russia) Y Buchina	6^{4}	2
Q	(Russia) D Mironova	7^{7}	6
(Russia) E Yashina	4	0
2	(Russia) A Panova	6	6

Second round
5	(Russia) V Solovieva	6	6
(Ukraine) Y Lysa	1	2
(Czech Republic) E Hrdinová	2	2
3	(Romania) M Buzărnescu	6	6
(Ukraine) A Vasylyeva	7	1	6
(Ukraine) E Ianchuk	5	6	1
Q	(Russia) D Mironova	2	7^{7}	3
2	(Russia) A Panova	6	6^{4}	6

Quarterfinals
5	(Russia) V Solovieva	2	4
3	(Romania) M Buzărnescu	6	6
(Ukraine) A Vasylyeva	2	4
2	(Russia) A Panova	6	6

Semifinals
3	(Romania) M Buzărnescu	6^{6}	1
2	(Russia) A Panova	7^{8}	6
