= 2011 Saransk Cup =

- Date: 5–11 September
- Edition: 1st
- Location: Saransk, Russia

Champions

Singles
- (Russia) Alexandra Panova

Doubles
- (Romania) Mihaela Buzărnescu / (Serbia) Teodora Mirčić
Saransk Cup	· 2012 →

The 2011 Saransk Cup was a professional tennis tournament played on clay courts. It was the 1st edition of the tournament which was part of the 2011 ITF Women's Circuit. It took place in Saransk, Russia between 5 and 11 September 2011.

== WTA entrants ==
=== Seeds ===
Country	Player	Rank^{1}	Seed
RUS	Anastasia Pivovarova	132	1
RUS	Alexandra Panova	154	2
ROU	Mihaela Buzărnescu	194	3
TUR	Çağla Büyükakçay	223	4
RUS	Valeria Solovieva	255	5
UKR	Veronika Kapshay	269	6
UKR	Valentyna Ivakhnenko	270	7
SRB	Teodora Mirčić	328	8

- ^{1} Rankings are as of August 29, 2011.

=== Other entrants ===
The following players received wildcards into the singles main draw:

- (Russia) Anastasia Frolova
- (Russia) Margarita Gasparyan
- (Russia) Ksenia Lykina
- (Russia) Marina Melnikova

The following players received entry from the qualifying draw:

- (Russia) Nadezda Gorbachkova
- (Russia) Victoria Kan
- (Russia) Daria Mironova
- (Russia) Polina Rodionova

== Champions ==
=== Singles ===
(Russia) Alexandra Panova def. (Russia) Marina Melnikova, 6–0, 6–2

=== Doubles ===
(Romania) Mihaela Buzărnescu / (Serbia) Teodora Mirčić def. (Czech Republic) Eva Hrdinová / (Ukraine) Veronika Kapshay, 6–3, 6–1
