= 2012 Internazionali Femminili di Palermo =

- Date: 9–15 July
- Edition: 25th
- Surface: Clay / outdoor
- Location: Palermo, Italy

Champions

Singles
- (Italy) Sara Errani

Doubles
- (Czech Republic) Renata Voráčová / (Czech Republic) Barbora Záhlavová-Strýcová
← 2011 ·	Internazionali Femminili di Palermo	· 2013 →

The 2012 Internazionali Femminili di Palermo was a professional women's tennis tournament played on outdoor clay courts. It was the 25th edition of the tournament which was part of the 2012 WTA Tour. It took place in Palermo, Italy between 9 July and 15 July 2012. First-seeded Sara Errani won the singles title.

== Singles main draw entrants ==
=== Seeds ===
Country	Player	Rank^{1}	Seed
ITA	Sara Errani	10	1
ITA	Roberta Vinci	23	2
GER	Julia Görges	24	3
ESP	Anabel Medina Garrigues	28	4
ESP	Carla Suárez Navarro	40	5
SLO	Polona Hercog	46	6
FRA	Alizé Cornet	60	7
CZE	Barbora Záhlavová-Strýcová	62	8

- ^{1} Rankings are as of June 25, 2012

=== Other entrants ===
The following players received wildcards into the singles main draw:

- (Italy) Nastassja Burnett
- (Italy) Maria Elena Camerin
- (Italy) Anastasia Grymalska

The following players received entry from the qualifying draw:

- (Spain) Estrella Cabeza Candela
- (Bulgaria) Dia Evtimova
- (Hungary) Katalin Marosi
- (Ukraine) Valentyna Ivakhnenko

The following players received entry as lucky loser:

- (Australia) Sacha Jones

=== Withdrawals ===
- (Estonia) Kaia Kanepi (heels)
- (Netherlands) Michaëlla Krajicek
- (Russia) Alexandra Panova
- (Israel) Shahar Peer
- (Poland) Agnieszka Radwańska (upper respiratory illness)
- (Italy) Francesca Schiavone (bronchitis)
- (Kazakhstan) Galina Voskoboeva
- (Czech Republic) Klára Zakopalová

=== Retirements ===
- (Hungary) Katalin Marosi
- (Georgia (country)) Anna Tatishvili

== Doubles main draw entrants ==
=== Seeds ===
Country	Player	Country	Player	Rank^{1}	Seed
CZE	Renata Voráčová	CZE	Barbora Záhlavová-Strýcová	106	1
CRO	Darija Jurak	HUN	Katalin Marosi	163	2
RUS	Vera Dushevina	ROU	Edina Gallovits-Hall	171	3
RUS	Elena Bovina	FRA	Alizé Cornet	191	4

- ^{1} Rankings are as of June 25, 2012

=== Other entrants ===
The following pairs received wildcards into the doubles main draw:

- (Italy) Nastassja Burnett / (Italy) Anastasia Grymalska
- (Italy) Claudia Giovine / (Romania) Mădălina Gojnea

=== Retirements ===
- (Georgia (country)) Anna Tatishvili (right thigh strain)

== Finals ==
=== Singles ===
- (Italy) Sara Errani defeated (Czech Republic) Barbora Záhlavová-Strýcová, 6–1, 6–3

=== Doubles ===
- (Czech Republic) Renata Voráčová / (Czech Republic) Barbora Záhlavová-Strýcová defeated (Croatia) Darija Jurak / (Hungary) Katalin Marosi, 7–6^{(7–5)}, 6–4
