= 2011 Saransk Cup – Doubles =

Doubles
- 2011 Saransk Cup

Final
- Champions: (Romania) Mihaela Buzărnescu (Serbia) Teodora Mirčić
- Runners-up: (Czech Republic) Eva Hrdinová (Ukraine) Veronika Kapshay
- Score: 6–3, 6–1

Events
Singles	Doubles
← 2010 ·	Saransk Cup	· 2012 →

This was a new event to the 2011 ITF Women's Circuit.
Mihaela Buzărnescu and Teodora Mirčić won the title by defeating Eva Hrdinová and Veronika Kapshay in the final 6–3, 6–1.

== Seeds ==
1. (Romania) Mihaela Buzărnescu / (Serbia) Teodora Mirčić (champions)
2. (Czech Republic) Eva Hrdinová / (Ukraine) Veronika Kapshay (final)
3. (Russia) Ksenia Lykina / (Russia) Anastasia Pivovarova (semifinals)
4. (Ukraine) Valentyna Ivakhnenko / (Ukraine) Kateryna Kozlova (semifinals)

== Draw ==
=== Key ===
- Q = Qualifier
- WC = Wild card
- LL = Lucky loser
- Alt = Alternate
- SE = Special exempt
- PR = Protected ranking
- ITF = ITF entry
- JE = Junior exempt
- w/o = Walkover
- r = Retired
- d = Defaulted
- SR = Special ranking

=== Draw ===
First round
1	(Romania) M Buzărnescu (Serbia) T Mirčić	7^{7}	6
(Russia) A Artamonova (Belarus) L Marozava	6^{1}	2
(Ukraine) A Piven (Ukraine) A Vasylyeva	7	6
WC	(Belarus) V Kuzmenkova (Russia) M Lazareva	5	3
3	(Russia) K Lykina (Russia) A Pivovarova	6	6
WC	(Russia) A Klyueva (Russia) I Slizovskaya	2	4
(Russia) E Svintsova (Russia) E Yashina	3	4
(Russia) E Pashkova (Russia) M Zharkova	6	6
(Russia) M Melnikova (Russia) M Shamayko	7	6
(Russia) I Glimakova (Russia) P Monova	5	3
(Russia) M Gasparyan (Russia) J Valetova	2	3
4	(Ukraine) V Ivakhnenko (Ukraine) K Kozlova	6	6
(Ukraine) E Ianchuk (Russia) V Solovieva	2	6	[10]
(Ukraine) A Fomina (Russia) A Gabueva	6	0	[8]
WC	(Russia) N Gorbachkova (Russia) A Treskunova	0	1
2	(Czech Republic) E Hrdinová (Ukraine) V Kapshay	6	6

Quarterfinals
1	(Romania) M Buzărnescu (Serbia) T Mirčić	6	6
(Ukraine) A Piven (Ukraine) A Vasylyeva	0	3
3	(Russia) K Lykina (Russia) A Pivovarova	6	6
(Russia) E Pashkova (Russia) M Zharkova	4	1
(Russia) M Melnikova (Russia) M Shamayko	4	5
4	(Ukraine) V Ivakhnenko (Ukraine) K Kozlova	6	7
(Ukraine) E Ianchuk (Russia) V Solovieva	5	3
2	(Czech Republic) E Hrdinová (Ukraine) V Kapshay	7	6

Semifinals
1	(Romania) M Buzărnescu (Serbia) T Mirčić	6	6
3	(Russia) K Lykina (Russia) A Pivovarova	4	2
4	(Ukraine) V Ivakhnenko (Ukraine) K Kozlova	5	1
2	(Czech Republic) E Hrdinová (Ukraine) V Kapshay	7	6

Finals
1	(Romania) M Buzărnescu (Serbia) T Mirčić	6	6
2	(Czech Republic) E Hrdinová (Ukraine) V Kapshay	3	1
