= 2012 Internazionali Femminili di Palermo – Doubles =

Doubles
- 2012 Internazionali Femminili di Palermo

Final
- Champions: (Czech Republic) Renata Voráčová (Czech Republic) Barbora Záhlavová-Strýcová
- Runners-up: (Croatia) Darija Jurak (Hungary) Katalin Marosi
- Score: 7–6^{(7–5)}, 6–4

Details
- Draw: 16
- Seeds: 4

Events
Singles	Doubles
← 2011 ·	Internazionali Femminili di Palermo	· 2013 →

Sara Errani and Roberta Vinci were the defending champions but decided not to participate.
In the final Renata Voráčová and Barbora Záhlavová-Strýcová defeated Darija Jurak and Katalin Marosi 7–6^{(7–5)}, 6–4.

== Seeds ==
1. (Czech Republic) Renata Voráčová / (Czech Republic) Barbora Záhlavová-Strýcová (champions)
2. (Croatia) Darija Jurak / (Hungary) Katalin Marosi (final)
3. (Russia) Vera Dushevina / (Romania) Edina Gallovits-Hall (semifinals)
4. (Russia) Elena Bovina / (France) Alizé Cornet (quarterfinals)

== Draw ==
=== Key ===
- Q = Qualifier
- WC = Wild card
- LL = Lucky loser
- Alt = Alternate
- SE = Special exempt
- PR = Protected ranking
- ITF = ITF entry
- JE = Junior exempt
- w/o = Walkover
- r = Retired
- d = Defaulted
- SR = Special ranking

=== Draw ===
First round
1	(Czech Republic) R Voráčová (Czech Republic) B Záhlavová-Strýcová	6	6
(Spain) S Soler Espinosa (Spain) C Suárez Navarro	3	4
(Russia) M Kondratieva (France) S Lefèvre	w/o
(Spain) E Cabeza Candela (Georgia (country)) A Tatishvili
3	(Russia) V Dushevina (Romania) E Gallovits-Hall	3	7^{7}	[11]
(Italy) ME Camerin (Italy) K Knapp	6	6^{2}	[9]
(United States) J Cohen (Belgium) T Hendler	7^{7}	6
WC	(Italy) C Giovine (Romania) M Gojnea	6^{4}	2
(Belarus) E Dzehalevich (Georgia (country)) O Kalashnikova	6	6
(Austria) S Klemenschits (Russia) V Savinykh	4	2
WC	(Italy) N Burnett (Italy) A Grymalska	1	4
4	(Russia) E Bovina (France) A Cornet	6	6
(Colombia) C Castaño (Colombia) M Duque	7	6
(Romania) A Cadanțu (Serbia) T Mirčić	5	4
(Australia) S Bengson (Italy) N Clerico	2	7	[8]
2	(Croatia) D Jurak (Hungary) K Marosi	6	5	[10]

Quarterfinals
1	(Czech Republic) R Voráčová (Czech Republic) B Záhlavová-Strýcová	6	7^{7}
(Russia) M Kondratieva (France) S Lefèvre	2	6^{4}
3	(Russia) V Dushevina (Romania) E Gallovits-Hall	6	6
(United States) J Cohen (Belgium) T Hendler	3	0
(Belarus) E Dzehalevich (Georgia (country)) O Kalashnikova	6	6
4	(Russia) E Bovina (France) A Cornet	2	3
(Colombia) C Castaño (Colombia) M Duque	1	5
2	(Croatia) D Jurak (Hungary) K Marosi	6	7

Semifinals
1	(Czech Republic) R Voráčová (Czech Republic) B Záhlavová-Strýcová	2	6	[10]
3	(Russia) V Dushevina (Romania) E Gallovits-Hall	6	4	[5]
(Belarus) E Dzehalevich (Georgia (country)) O Kalashnikova	6	4	[10]
2	(Croatia) D Jurak (Hungary) K Marosi	4	6	[12]

Final
1	(Czech Republic) R Voráčová (Czech Republic) B Záhlavová-Strýcová	7^{7}	6
2	(Croatia) D Jurak (Hungary) K Marosi	6^{5}	4
