= 2012 Goldwater Women's Tennis Classic – Singles =

Aspect of the tournament

Singles
- 2012 Goldwater Women's Tennis Classic

Final
- Champion: (United States) Madison Keys
- Runner-up: (United States) Maria Sanchez
- Score: 6–3, 7–6^{(7–1)}

Events
| Singles | Doubles |
| ← 2011 · | Goldwater Women's Tennis Classic |

Sesil Karatantcheva was the defending champion, but lost to Shelby Rogers in the first round.

Madison Keys won the title, defeating Maria Sanchez in the final, 6–3, 7–6^{(7–1)}.

== Seeds ==
1. (Italy) Camila Giorgi (quarterfinals)
2. (Kazakhstan) Sesil Karatantcheva (first round)
3. (United States) Melanie Oudin (first round)
4. (Portugal) Michelle Larcher de Brito (quarterfinals)
5. (Croatia) Mirjana Lučić (quarterfinals)
6. (United States) Alexa Glatch (first round)
7. (United States) Mallory Burdette (first round)
8. (United States) Maria Sanchez (final)

== Main draw ==
=== Key ===
- Q = Qualifier
- WC = Wild card
- LL = Lucky loser
- Alt = Alternate
- SE = Special exempt
- PR = Protected ranking
- ITF = ITF entry
- JE = Junior exempt
- w/o = Walkover
- r = Retired
- d = Defaulted
- SR = Special ranking

=== Finals ===
Semifinals
8 | (United States) Maria Sanchez | 6 | 6
Q | (Canada) Gabriela Dabrowski | 2 | 2
(United States) Madison Keys | 6 | 6
(Canada) Sharon Fichman | 1 | 3

Final
8 | (United States) Maria Sanchez | 3 | 6^{1}
(United States) Madison Keys | 6 | 7^{7}

=== Top half ===
First round
1 | (Italy) C Giorgi | 6 | 4 | 6
Q | (United States) S Vickery | 4 | 6 | 3
(United States) C Scholl | 7^{7} | 6
WC | (United States) A Weinhold | 6^{5} | 3
(Venezuela) A Pérez | 6 | 1 | 4
(United States) S Crawford | 4 | 6 | 6
(Canada) E Bouchard | 5 | 3
8 | (United States) M Sanchez | 7 | 6
4 | (Portugal) M Larcher de Brito | 6 | 3 | 7^{7}
Q | (United States) J Abaza | 4 | 6 | 6^{4}
(United States) J Craybas | 4 | 3
WC | (United States) V Duval | 6 | 6
Q | (United States) K Ahn | 6 | 6
WC | (Netherlands) J Scheepens | 2 | 3
Q | (Canada) G Dabrowski | 4 | 6 | 6
6 | (United States) A Glatch | 6 | 2 | 2

Second round
1 | (Italy) C Giorgi | 6^{4} | 7 | 6
(United States) C Scholl | 7^{7} | 5 | 3
(United States) S Crawford | 3 | 6 | 0
8 | (United States) M Sanchez | 6 | 4 | 6
4 | (Portugal) M Larcher de Brito | 6 | 6
WC | (United States) V Duval | 3 | 0
Q | (United States) K Ahn | 1 | 2
Q | (Canada) G Dabrowski | 6 | 6

Quarterfinals
1 | (Italy) C Giorgi | 6 | 0 | 5
8 | (United States) M Sanchez | 1 | 6 | 7
4 | (Portugal) M Larcher de Brito | 3 | 2
Q | (Canada) G Dabrowski | 6 | 6

Semifinals
8 | (United States) M Sanchez | 6 | 6
Q | (Canada) G Dabrowski | 2 | 2

=== Bottom half ===
First round
5 | (Croatia) M Lučić | 6 | 1 | 7
(Russia) A Kudryavtseva | 3 | 6 | 5
(United States) J Boserup | 6 | 1 | 6
(Colombia) M Duque | 3 | 6 | 2
(United States) M Keys | 6 | 6
LL | (Indonesia) R Tedjakusuma | 1 | 2
(United States) B Mattek-Sands | 6 | 6
3 | (United States) M Oudin | 3 | 4
7 | (United States) M Burdette | 5 | 4
(Canada) S Fichman | 7 | 6
(United States) C-Y Hsu | 4 | 6 | 0
(United States) G Min | 6 | 2 | 6
WC | (United States) T Townsend | 6 | 6
(Slovakia) M Hončová | 0 | 4
(United States) S Rogers | 6 | 6
2 | (Kazakhstan) S Karatantcheva | 1 | 2

Second round
5 | (Croatia) M Lučić | 6 | 6
(United States) J Boserup | 1 | 4
(United States) M Keys | 6 | 7
(United States) B Mattek-Sands | 3 | 5
(Canada) S Fichman | 2 | 6 | 6
(United States) G Min | 6 | 3 | 4
WC | (United States) T Townsend | 7 | 6
(United States) S Rogers | 5 | 4

Quarterfinals
5 | (Croatia) M Lučić | 5 | 1
(United States) M Keys | 7 | 6
(Canada) S Fichman | 6 | 3 | 6
WC | (United States) T Townsend | 4 | 6 | 4

Semifinals
(United States) M Keys | 6 | 6
(Canada) S Fichman | 1 | 3
