= 2013 Internazionali Femminili di Palermo – Singles =

Singles
- 2013 Internazionali Femminili di Palermo

Final
- Champion: (Italy) Roberta Vinci
- Runner-up: (Italy) Sara Errani
- Score: 6–3, 3–6, 6–3

Details
- Draw: 32
- Seeds: 8

Events
| Singles | Doubles |
| ← 2012 · | Internazionali Femminili di Palermo | · 2019 → |

Sara Errani was the defending champion, but lost in the final to her long-term doubles partner Roberta Vinci, 3–6, 6–3, 3–6.

== Seeds ==
1. (Italy) Sara Errani (final)
2. (Italy) Roberta Vinci (champion)
3. (France) Kristina Mladenovic (second round)
4. (Czech Republic) Klára Zakopalová (semifinals)
5. (Spain) Lourdes Domínguez Lino (quarterfinals)
6. (Romania) Irina-Camelia Begu (first round)
7. (Spain) Silvia Soler Espinosa (quarterfinals)
8. (Czech Republic) Karolína Plíšková (first round)

== Draw ==
=== Key ===
- Q = Qualifier
- WC = Wild card
- LL = Lucky loser
- Alt = Alternate
- SE = Special exempt
- PR = Protected ranking
- ITF = ITF entry
- JE = Junior exempt
- w/o = Walkover
- r = Retired
- d = Defaulted
- SR = Special ranking

=== Finals ===
Semifinals
1/WC | (Italy) Sara Errani | 6 | 6
4 | (Czech Republic) Klára Zakopalová | 4 | 4
(Spain) Estrella Cabeza Candela | 7 | 2 | 2
2 | (Italy) Roberta Vinci | 5 | 6 | 6

Final
1/WC | (Italy) Sara Errani | 3 | 6 | 3
2 | (Italy) Roberta Vinci | 6 | 3 | 6

=== Top half ===
First round
1/WC | (Italy) S Errani | 6 | 6
(United States) J Cohen | 0 | 1
(Czech Republic) Kr Plíšková | 4 | 4
(Czech Republic) B Záhlavová-Strýcová | 6 | 6
(Colombia) M Duque Mariño | 3 | 3
(Croatia) M Lučić-Baroni | 6 | 6
(France) M Johansson | 4 | 6 | 5
7 | (Spain) S Soler Espinosa | 6 | 1 | 7
4 | (Czech Republic) K Zakopalová | 6 | 2 | 6
(Italy) F Pennetta | 2 | 6 | 3
(Brazil) T Pereira | 3 | 2
(Italy) K Knapp | 6 | 6
Q | (Germany) K Barrois | 4 | 6 | 2
(Spain) A Medina Garrigues | 6 | 4 | 6
(Germany) D Pfizenmaier | 7 | 7
8 | (Czech Republic) Ka Plíšková | 5 | 5

Second round
1/WC | (Italy) S Errani | 6 | 6
(Czech Republic) B Záhlavová-Strýcová | 3 | 2
(Croatia) M Lučić-Baroni | 2 | 0^{r}
7 | (Spain) S Soler Espinosa | 6 | 1
4 | (Czech Republic) K Zakopalová | 6 | 4 | 6
(Italy) K Knapp | 3 | 6 | 4
(Spain) A Medina Garrigues | 1 | 1
(Germany) D Pfizenmaier | 6 | 6

Quarterfinals
1/WC | (Italy) S Errani | 6 | 6
7 | (Spain) S Soler Espinosa | 4 | 0
4 | (Czech Republic) K Zakopalová | 7 | 6^{4} | 6
(Germany) D Pfizenmaier | 5 | 7^{7} | 1

Semifinals
1/WC | (Italy) S Errani | 6 | 6
4 | (Czech Republic) K Zakopalová | 4 | 4

=== Bottom half ===
First round
6 | (Romania) I-C Begu | 5 | 2
(Czech Republic) R Voráčová | 7 | 6
(France) C Garcia | 7 | 4 | 4
WC | (Italy) C Dentoni | 5 | 6 | 6
(Spain) E Cabeza Candela | 6 | 6
WC | (Italy) A Matteucci | 4 | 1
Q | (Portugal) MJ Koehler | 1 | 6^{5}
3 | (France) K Mladenovic | 6 | 7^{7}
5 | (Spain) L Domínguez Lino | 5
Q | (Romania) A Dulgheru | 1^{r}
(Italy) N Burnett | 6 | 7
(Ukraine) M Zanevska | 0 | 5
(Czech Republic) E Birnerová | 4 | 1
(Slovenia) P Hercog | 6 | 6
Q | (Italy) G Gatto-Monticone | 6^{6} | 3
2 | (Italy) R Vinci | 7^{8} | 6

Second round
(Czech Republic) R Voráčová | 7 | 6
WC | (Italy) C Dentoni | 5 | 1
(Spain) E Cabeza Candela | 6 | 2 | 7^{8}
3 | (France) K Mladenovic | 3 | 6 | 6^{6}
5 | (Spain) L Domínguez Lino | 7 | 4 | 6
(Italy) N Burnett | 5 | 6 | 3
(Slovenia) P Hercog | 2 | 6^{3}
2 | (Italy) R Vinci | 6 | 7^{7}

Quarterfinals
(Czech Republic) R Voráčová | 5 | 4
(Spain) E Cabeza Candela | 7 | 6
5 | (Spain) L Domínguez Lino | 1 | 4
2 | (Italy) R Vinci | 6 | 6

Semifinals
(Spain) E Cabeza Candela | 7 | 2 | 2
2 | (Italy) R Vinci | 5 | 6 | 6

== Qualifying ==
=== Seeds ===
1. (Portugal) Maria João Koehler (qualified)
2. (Spain) Arantxa Parra Santonja (qualifying competition)
3. (Switzerland) Amra Sadiković (second round)
4. (Belarus) Aliaksandra Sasnovich (second round)
5. (Italy) Anastasia Grymalska (first round)
6. (Venezuela) Andrea Gámiz (second round)
7. (Spain) Beatriz García Vidagany (qualifying competition)
8. (Italy) Anna Floris (qualifying competition)

=== Qualifiers ===
1. (Portugal) Maria João Koehler
2. (Germany) Kristina Barrois
3. (Romania) Alexandra Dulgheru
4. (Italy) Giulia Gatto-Monticone

=== Qualifying draw ===
==== First qualifier ====
First round
1 | (Portugal) Maria João Koehler | 6 | 6
(Poland) Justyna Jegiołka | 2 | 2
WC | (Italy) Martina Caregaro | 6 | 2 | 4
(Spain) Sara Sorribes Tormo | 3 | 6 | 6
(Serbia) Teodora Mirčić | 6 | 7
(Georgia (country)) Margalita Chakhnashvili | 0 | 5
(Germany) Julia Kimmelmann | 4 | 6 | 2
8 | (Italy) Anna Floris | 6 | 1 | 6

Second round
1 | (Portugal) Maria João Koehler | 6 | 6
(Spain) Sara Sorribes Tormo | 4 | 2
(Serbia) Teodora Mirčić | 7 | 2 | 4
8 | (Italy) Anna Floris | 5 | 6 | 6

Qualifying competition
1 | (Portugal) Maria João Koehler | 6 | 7
8 | (Italy) Anna Floris | 1 | 5

==== Second qualifier ====
First round
2 | (Spain) Arantxa Parra Santonja | 6^{5} | 6 | 6
WC | (Italy) Carolina Pillot | 7^{7} | 4 | 1
(Russia) Marina Melnikova | 7^{7} | 7^{7}
(Italy) Anna Remondina | 6^{4} | 6^{3}
(Slovenia) Nastja Kolar | 3 | 2
(Germany) Kristina Barrois | 6 | 6
(Spain) Inés Ferrer Suárez | 2 | 2
6 | (Venezuela) Andrea Gámiz | 6 | 6

Second round
2 | (Spain) Arantxa Parra Santonja | 6 | 7
(Russia) Marina Melnikova | 1 | 5
(Germany) Kristina Barrois | 6 | 6
6 | (Venezuela) Andrea Gámiz | 3 | 1

Qualifying competition
2 | (Spain) Arantxa Parra Santonja | 6 | 3 | 1
(Germany) Kristina Barrois | 3 | 6 | 6

==== Third qualifier ====
First round
3 | (Switzerland) Amra Sadiković | 6 | 6
(Austria) Nicole Rottmann | 1 | 0
(Romania) Alexandra Dulgheru | 6 | 6
(Bulgaria) Isabella Shinikova | 3 | 0
(Germany) Kim Grajdek | 6 | 4 | 6
WC | (Italy) Miriana Tona | 4 | 6 | 3
(Russia) Marina Shamayko | 7^{8} | 3 | 6^{1}
7 | (Spain) Beatriz García Vidagany | 6^{6} | 6 | 7^{7}

Second round
3 | (Switzerland) Amra Sadiković | 7 | 5 | 4
(Romania) Alexandra Dulgheru | 5 | 7 | 6
(Germany) Kim Grajdek | 1 | 1
7 | (Spain) Beatriz García Vidagany | 6 | 6

Qualifying competition
(Romania) Alexandra Dulgheru | 6 | 6
7 | (Spain) Beatriz García Vidagany | 4 | 4

==== Fourth qualifier ====
First round
4 | (Belarus) Aliaksandra Sasnovich | 7 | 6
WC | (Italy) Giulia Pairone | 5 | 0
(Italy) Francesca Palmigiano | 1 | 3
(Switzerland) Viktorija Golubic | 6 | 6
WC | (Spain) Paula Badosa | 7^{7} | 4
(Germany) Justine Ozga | 6^{5} | 2^{r}
(Italy) Giulia Gatto-Monticone | 6 | 6
5 | (Italy) Anastasia Grymalska | 3 | 2

Second round
4 | (Belarus) Aliaksandra Sasnovich | 1 | 2
(Switzerland) Viktorija Golubic | 6 | 6
WC | (Spain) Paula Badosa | 1 | 0
(Italy) Giulia Gatto-Monticone | 6 | 6

Qualifying competition
(Switzerland) Viktorija Golubic | 6^{5} | 6^{6}
(Italy) Giulia Gatto-Monticone | 7^{7} | 7^{8}
