= 2011 Goldwater Women's Tennis Classic =

Tennis tournament

- Date: 7–13 November
- Edition: 3rd
- Location: Phoenix, Arizona, United States

Champions

Singles
- (Kazakhstan) Sesil Karatantcheva

Doubles
- (United States) Jamie Hampton / (Croatia) Ajla Tomljanović
← 2010 ·	Goldwater Women's Tennis Classic	· 2012 →

The 2011 Goldwater Women's Tennis Classic was a professional tennis tournament played on hard courts. It was the third edition of the tournament which was part of the 2011 ITF Women's Circuit. It took place in Phoenix, Arizona, United States between 7 and 13 November 2011.

== WTA entrants ==
=== Seeds ===
Country	Player	Rank^{1}	Seed
USA	Irina Falconi	79	1
USA	Varvara Lepchenko	103	2
LUX	Mandy Minella	119	3
USA	Jamie Hampton	125	4
CHN	Zhang Shuai	127	5
USA	Coco Vandeweghe	128	6
ITA	Camila Giorgi	143	7
CRO	Ajla Tomljanović	147	8

- ^{1} Rankings are as of October 31, 2011.

=== Other entrants ===
The following players received wildcards into the singles main draw:

- (United States) Gail Brodsky
- (United States) Victoria Duval
- (United States) June Lee

The following players received entry from the qualifying draw:

- (Russia) Elena Bovina
- (United States) Krista Hardebeck
- (United States) Grace Min
- (United States) Yasmin Schnack

== Champions ==
=== Singles ===
(Kazakhstan) Sesil Karatantcheva def. (Portugal) Michelle Larcher de Brito, 6–1, 7–5

=== Doubles ===
(United States) Jamie Hampton / (Croatia) Ajla Tomljanović def. (United States) Maria Sanchez / (United States) Yasmin Schnack, 3–6, 6–3, [10–6]
