= 2011 Internazionali Femminili di Palermo – Doubles =

Doubles
- 2011 Internazionali Femminili di Palermo

Final
- Champions: (Italy) Sara Errani (Italy) Roberta Vinci
- Runners-up: (Czech Republic) Andrea Hlaváčková (Czech Republic) Klára Zakopalová
- Score: 7–5, 6–1

Details
- Draw: 16
- Seeds: 4

Events
Singles	Doubles
← 2010 ·	Internazionali Femminili di Palermo	· 2012 →

Alberta Brianti and Sara Errani were the defending champions, but decided not to participate together.

Brianti partnered up with Akgul Amanmuradova, but lost already in the first round to eventual champions Errani and Roberta Vinci. This pair won the tournament, defeating Andrea Hlaváčková and Klára Zakopalová, 7–5, 6–1, in the final.

== Seeds ==
1. (Italy) Sara Errani / (Italy) Roberta Vinci (champions)
2. (Czech Republic) Andrea Hlaváčková / (Czech Republic) Klára Zakopalová (final)
3. (Russia) Maria Kondratieva / (France) Sophie Lefèvre (semifinals)
4. (Romania) Sorana Cîrstea / (Slovenia) Andreja Klepač (first round)

== Draw ==
=== Key ===
- Q = Qualifier
- WC = Wild card
- LL = Lucky loser
- Alt = Alternate
- SE = Special exempt
- PR = Protected ranking
- ITF = ITF entry
- JE = Junior exempt
- w/o = Walkover
- r = Retired
- d = Defaulted
- SR = Special ranking

=== Draw ===
First round
1	(Italy) S Errani (Italy) R Vinci	6	6
(Uzbekistan) A Amanmuradova (Italy) A Brianti	4	1
(Romania) I-C Begu (Croatia) D Jurak	6	6
(Spain) L Arruabarrena-Vecino (Spain) E Fernández-Brugués	4	1
3	(Russia) M Kondratieva (France) S Lefèvre	6	6
(France) K Mladenovic (Poland) K Piter	4	1
(Russia) E Bovina (Latvia) L Dekmeijere	6^{3}	2
(Italy) ME Camerin (Turkey) İ Şenoğlu	7^{7}	6
(Spain) B García Vidagany (Italy) C Giovine	2	6	[10]
(Russia) R Kulikova (Croatia) A Mijačika	6	4	[5]
(Serbia) T Mirčić (France) L Thorpe	4	6	[11]
4	(Romania) S Cîrstea (Slovenia) A Klepač	6	2	[9]
(Italy) C Dentoni (Italy) K Knapp	2	3
(Italy) G Barbieri (Italy) A Grymalska	6	6
(Romania) M Gojnea (Romania) L Ungur	4	4
2	(Czech Republic) A Hlaváčková (Czech Republic) K Zakopalová	6	6

Quarterfinals
1	(Italy) S Errani (Italy) R Vinci	6	6
(Romania) I-C Begu (Croatia) D Jurak	3	4
3	(Russia) M Kondratieva (France) S Lefèvre	7^{7}	6
(Italy) ME Camerin (Turkey) İ Şenoğlu	6^{2}	3
(Spain) B García Vidagany (Italy) C Giovine	4	4
(Serbia) T Mirčić (France) L Thorpe	6	6
(Italy) G Barbieri (Italy) A Grymalska	3	2
2	(Czech Republic) A Hlaváčková (Czech Republic) K Zakopalová	6	6

Semifinals
1	(Italy) S Errani (Italy) R Vinci	6	6
3	(Russia) M Kondratieva (France) S Lefèvre	1	2
(Serbia) T Mirčić (France) L Thorpe	2	4
2	(Czech Republic) A Hlaváčková (Czech Republic) K Zakopalová	6	6

Final
1	(Italy) S Errani (Italy) R Vinci	7	6
2	(Czech Republic) A Hlaváčková (Czech Republic) K Zakopalová	5	1
