= 2011 Goldwater Women's Tennis Classic – Singles =

Singles
- 2011 Goldwater Women's Tennis Classic

Final
- Champion: (Kazakhstan) Sesil Karatantcheva
- Runner-up: (Portugal) Michelle Larcher de Brito
- Score: 6–1, 7–5

Events
Singles	Doubles
← 2010 ·	Goldwater Women's Tennis Classic	· 2012 →

Varvara Lepchenko was the defending champion, but lost to Monica Puig in the second round.

Sesil Karatantcheva won the title defeating Michelle Larcher de Brito in the final 6–1, 7–5.

== Seeds ==
1. (United States) Irina Falconi (first round)
2. (United States) Varvara Lepchenko (second round)
3. (Luxembourg) Mandy Minella (semifinals)
4. (United States) Jamie Hampton (first round)
5. (China) Zhang Shuai (second round)
6. (United States) Coco Vandeweghe (second round)
7. (Italy) Camila Giorgi (first round)
8. (Croatia) Ajla Tomljanović (second round)

== Draw ==
=== Key ===
- Q = Qualifier
- WC = Wild card
- LL = Lucky loser
- Alt = Alternate
- SE = Special exempt
- PR = Protected ranking
- ITF = ITF entry
- JE = Junior exempt
- w/o = Walkover
- r = Retired
- d = Defaulted
- SR = Special ranking

=== Finals ===
Semifinals
(Portugal) Michelle Larcher de Brito	6	6
3	(Luxembourg) Mandy Minella	2	0
(United States) Madison Keys	6	6^{4}	3
(Kazakhstan) Sesil Karatantcheva	1	7^{7}	6

Final
(Portugal) Michelle Larcher de Brito	1	5
(Kazakhstan) Sesil Karatantcheva	6	7

=== Top half ===
First round
1	(United States) I Falconi	2	6	0
(Portugal) M Larcher de Brito	6	4	6
(Japan) K Nara	6	6
Q	(United States) Y Schnack	2	3
(Russia) O Puchkova	6	4	6
(Japan) E Takao	1	6	4
WC	(United States) J Lee	2	1
6	(United States) C Vandeweghe	6	6
3	(Luxembourg) M Minella	7^{11}	6
(South Africa) C Simmonds	6^{9}	4
Q	(United States) K Hardebeck	0	3
(United States) A Fink	6	6
(United States) M Brengle	3	6	4
WC	(United States) G Brodsky	6	1	6
(Slovenia) P Rampre	6	2	7
7	(Italy) C Giorgi	3	6	5

Second round
(Portugal) M Larcher de Brito	6	6
(Japan) K Nara	4	4
(Russia) O Puchkova	6	7^{7}
6	(United States) C Vandeweghe	4	6^{3}
3	(Luxembourg) M Minella	6	6
(United States) A Fink	3	1
WC	(United States) G Brodsky	3	3
(Slovenia) P Rampre	6	6

Quarterfinals
(Portugal) M Larcher de Brito	2	6	6
(Russia) O Puchkova	6	2	1
3	(Luxembourg) M Minella	6	6
(Slovenia) P Rampre	2	3

Semifinals
(Portugal) M Larcher de Brito	6	6
3	(Luxembourg) M Minella	2	0

=== Bottom half ===
First round
5	(China) S Zhang	6	6
(Belgium) T Hendler	1	0
Q	(United States) G Min	6	6
(United States) C Scholl	3	0
WC	(United States) V Duval	0	6	4
(United States) A Stevenson	6	3	1^{r}
(United States) M Keys	6	6
4	(United States) J Hampton	3	4
8	(Croatia) A Tomljanović	1	6	7
(United States) J Boserup	6	4	5
Q	(Russia) E Bovina	0	2
(Kazakhstan) S Karatantcheva	6	6
(Puerto Rico) M Puig	6	6
(United States) A Weinhold	3	2
(Romania) IR Olaru	4	3
2	(United States) V Lepchenko	6	6

Second round
5	(China) S Zhang	3	6	2
Q	(United States) G Min	6	1	6
WC	(United States) V Duval	3	1
(United States) M Keys	6	6
8	(Croatia) A Tomljanović	2	3
(Kazakhstan) S Karatantcheva	6	6
(Puerto Rico) M Puig	3	6	6
2	(United States) V Lepchenko	6	3	1

Quarterfinals
Q	(United States) G Min	3	3
(United States) M Keys	6	6
(Kazakhstan) S Karatantcheva	6	7^{7}
(Puerto Rico) M Puig	3	6^{4}

Semifinals
(United States) M Keys	6	6^{4}	3
(Kazakhstan) S Karatantcheva	1	7^{7}	6
