= Saransk Cup =

ITF Women's Tour
- Event name: Saransk Cup
- Location: Saransk, Russia
- Category: ITF Women's Circuit
- Surface: Clay
- Draw: 32S/32Q/16D
- Prize money: $50,000

The Saransk Cup was a tournament for professional female tennis players played on outdoor clay courts. The event was classified as a $50,000 ITF Women's Circuit tournament. It was held in Saransk, Russia, in 2011.

== Past finals ==
=== Women's singles ===
Year	Champion	Runner-up	Score
2011	(Russia) Alexandra Panova	(Russia) Marina Melnikova	6–0, 6–2

=== Women's doubles ===
Year	Champions	Runners-up	Score
2011	(Romania) Mihaela Buzărnescu (Serbia) Teodora Mirčić	(Czech Republic) Eva Hrdinová (Ukraine) Veronika Kapshay	6–3, 6–1
