= 2012 Goldwater Women's Tennis Classic – Doubles =

Aspect of the tournament

Doubles
- 2012 Goldwater Women's Tennis Classic

Final
- Champions: (United States) Jacqueline Cako (United States) Natalie Pluskota
- Runners-up: (Canada) Eugenie Bouchard (Norway) Ulrikke Eikeri
- Score: 6–3, 2–6, [10–4]

Events
Singles	Doubles
← 2011 ·	Goldwater Women's Tennis Classic

Jamie Hampton and Ajla Tomljanović were the defending champions, but none of them took part in the 2012 tournament.

Jacqueline Cako and Natalie Pluskota won the title by defeating Eugenie Bouchard and Ulrikke Eikeri in the final, 6–3, 2–6, [10–4].

== Seeds ==
1. (United States) Jill Craybas / (Latvia) Līga Dekmeijere (first round)
2. (Canada) Gabriela Dabrowski / (Russia) Alla Kudryavtseva (first round)
3. (United States) Melanie Oudin / (United States) Maria Sanchez (quarterfinals)
4. (Canada) Sharon Fichman / (United Kingdom) Samantha Murray (first round)

== Draw ==
=== Key ===
- Q = Qualifier
- WC = Wild card
- LL = Lucky loser
- Alt = Alternate
- SE = Special exempt
- PR = Protected ranking
- ITF = ITF entry
- JE = Junior exempt
- w/o = Walkover
- r = Retired
- d = Defaulted
- SR = Special ranking

First round
1	(United States) J Craybas (Latvia) L Dekmeijere	4	3
(United States) A Glatch (United States) A Muhammad	6	6
(United States) J Cako (United States) N Pluskota	6	7
(United States) E Lumpkin (Ukraine) A Sotnikova	4	5
3	(United States) M Oudin (United States) M Sanchez	6	4	[14]
(United States) S Rogers (United States) A Weinhold	3	6	[12]
(United Kingdom) S Borwell (United Kingdom) N Slater	2	6	[10]
(United States) S Crawford (United States) M Keys	6	2	[5]
(Slovakia) M Hončová (Slovakia) L Wienerová	5	4
(United States) N Melichar (United States) C Scholl	7	6
(United States) EJ Harman (United States) C-Y Hsu	6	6^{5}	[10]
4	(Canada) S Fichman (United Kingdom) S Murray	2	7^{7}	[7]
(Canada) E Bouchard (Norway) U Eikeri	6	6
(United States) L Litvak (Venezuela) A Pérez	2	0
(United States) K Ahn (United States) M Burdette	6	6
2	(Canada) G Dabrowski (Russia) A Kudryavtseva	2	4

Quarterfinals
(United States) A Glatch (United States) A Muhammad	4	6	[3]
(United States) J Cako (United States) N Pluskota	6	4	[10]
3	(United States) M Oudin (United States) M Sanchez	6	1	[8]
(United Kingdom) S Borwell (United Kingdom) N Slater	1	6	[10]
(United States) N Melichar (United States) C Scholl	6	4	[5]
(United States) EJ Harman (United States) C-Y Hsu	4	6	[10]
(Canada) E Bouchard (Norway) U Eikeri	6^{3}	6	[10]
(United States) K Ahn (United States) M Burdette	7^{7}	4	[8]

Semifinals
(United States) J Cako (United States) N Pluskota	6	6
(United Kingdom) S Borwell (United Kingdom) N Slater	1	3
(United States) EJ Harman (United States) C-Y Hsu	7	3	[4]
(Canada) E Bouchard (Norway) U Eikeri	5	6	[10]

Finals
(United States) J Cako (United States) N Pluskota	6	2	[10]
(Canada) E Bouchard (Norway) U Eikeri	3	6	[4]
