= 2011 Poli-Farbe Budapest Grand Prix – Singles qualifying =

This article displays the qualifying draw of the 2011 Poli-Farbe Budapest Grand Prix.

== Players ==
=== Seeds ===
1. (Ukraine) Mariya Koryttseva (first round)
2. (Romania) Ioana Raluca Olaru (second round)
3. (Slovakia) Lenka Juríková (qualified)
4. (Spain) Estrella Cabeza Candela (qualified)
5. (Serbia) Aleksandra Krunić (qualified)
6. (Hungary) Réka-Luca Jani (qualified)
7. (Argentina) Paula Ormaechea (second round)
8. (Italy) Anna-Giulia Remondina (qualifying competition, lucky loser)

=== Qualifiers ===
1. (Serbia) Aleksandra Krunić
2. (Hungary) Réka-Luca Jani
3. (Slovakia) Lenka Juríková
4. (Spain) Estrella Cabeza Candela

=== Lucky losers ===
1. (Italy) Anna-Giulia Remondina

== Qualifying draw ==
=== First qualifier ===
First round
1	(Ukraine) Mariya Koryttseva	3	7	2
(Russia) Olga Puchkova	6	5	6
(Japan) Ryoko Fuda	6	6
(Ukraine) Nadiya Kichenok	4	4
(Serbia) Teodora Mirčić	6	6
WC	(Hungary) Vaszilisza Bulgakova	4	1
WC	(South Africa) Natalie Grandin	3	4
5	(Serbia) Aleksandra Krunić	6	6

Second round
(Russia) Olga Puchkova	3	6	6
(Japan) Ryoko Fuda	6	4	3
(Serbia) Teodora Mirčić	6	3	3
5	(Serbia) Aleksandra Krunić	3	6	6

Qualifying competition
(Russia) Olga Puchkova	0	2
5	(Serbia) Aleksandra Krunić	6	6

=== Second qualifier ===
First round
2	(Romania) Ioana Raluca Olaru	6	6
(Croatia) Ani Mijačika	4	4
(Australia) Daniella Dominikovic	3	3
(Ukraine) Irina Buryachok	6	6
(Bosnia and Herzegovina) Jasmina Tinjić	6	6
(Greece) Stamatia Fafaliou	0	0
WC	(Australia) Lauren Breadmore	3	3
6	(Hungary) Réka-Luca Jani	6	6

Second round
2	(Romania) Ioana Raluca Olaru	4	2
(Ukraine) Irina Buryachok	6	6
(Bosnia and Herzegovina) Jasmina Tinjić	6	1	4
6	(Hungary) Réka-Luca Jani	0	6	6

Qualifying competition
(Ukraine) Irina Buryachok	4	6	3
6	(Hungary) Réka-Luca Jani	6	3	6

=== Third qualifier ===
First round
3	(Slovakia) Lenka Juríková	6	6^{3}	6
(Austria) Nicole Rottmann	1	7^{7}	2
(Slovakia) Michaela Pochabová	1	4
(Slovenia) Andreja Klepač	6	6
(Switzerland) Viktorija Golubic	3	1
(Ukraine) Lyudmyla Kichenok	6	6
WC	(Hungary) Ágnes Bukta	3	1
7	(Argentina) Paula Ormaechea	6	6

Second round
3	(Slovakia) Lenka Juríková	6	6
(Slovenia) Andreja Klepač	1	3
(Ukraine) Lyudmyla Kichenok	6	6
7	(Argentina) Paula Ormaechea	4	3

Qualifying competition
3	(Slovakia) Lenka Juríková	6	6
(Ukraine) Lyudmyla Kichenok	4	3

=== Fourth qualifier ===
First round
4	(Spain) Estrella Cabeza Candela	6	3	6
(Croatia) Silvia Njirić	4	6	1
(Belarus) Tatiana Poutchek	6	6
(Czech Republic) Eva Hrdinová	2	2
(Slovakia) Michaela Hončová	6	6
(Australia) Jessica Moore	0	3
Alt	(Czech Republic) Vladimíra Uhlířová	0	4
8	(Italy) Anna-Giulia Remondina	6	6

Second round
4	(Spain) Estrella Cabeza Candela	6	6
(Belarus) Tatiana Poutchek	0	3
(Slovakia) Michaela Hončová	2	1
8	(Italy) Anna-Giulia Remondina	6	6

Qualifying competition
4	(Spain) Estrella Cabeza Candela	6	6
8	(Italy) Anna-Giulia Remondina	4	3
