= 2013 Internazionali Femminili di Palermo =

- Date: 8 – 14 July
- Edition: 26th
- Surface: Clay / Outdoor
- Location: Palermo, Italy
- Venue: Country Time Club

Champions

Singles
- (Italy) Roberta Vinci

Doubles
- (France) Kristina Mladenovic / (Poland) Katarzyna Piter
← 2012 ·	Internazionali Femminili di Palermo	· 2019 →

The 2013 Internazionali Femminili di Palermo was a professional women's tennis tournament played on outdoor clay courts. It was the 26th edition of the tournament which was part of the 2013 WTA Tour. It took place in Palermo, Italy between 8 and 14 July 2013.

== Singles main draw entrants ==
=== Seeds ===
Country	Player	Rank^{1}	Seed
ITA	Sara Errani	5	1
ITA	Roberta Vinci	11	2
FRA	Kristina Mladenovic	37	3
CZE	Klára Zakopalová	43	4
ESP	Lourdes Domínguez Lino	53	5
ROU	Irina-Camelia Begu	61	6
ESP	Silvia Soler Espinosa	74	7
CZE	Karolína Plíšková	77	8

- ^{1} Rankings are as of June 24, 2013

=== Other entrants ===
The following players received wildcards into the singles main draw:

- (Italy) Corinna Dentoni
- (Italy) Sara Errani
- (Italy) Alice Matteucci

The following players received entry from the qualifying draw:

- (Germany) Kristina Barrois
- (Romania) Alexandra Dulgheru
- (Italy) Giulia Gatto-Monticone
- (Portugal) Maria João Koehler

=== Withdrawals ===
Before the tournament

- (United States) Alexa Glatch
- (Germany) Tatjana Maria
- (Argentina) Paula Ormaechea
- (Kazakhstan) Yaroslava Shvedova

=== Retirements ===
- (Romania) Alexandra Dulgheru (right toe injury)
- (Croatia) Mirjana Lučić-Baroni (gastrointestinal illness)

== Doubles main draw entrants ==
=== Seeds ===
Country	Player	Country	Player	Rank^{1}	Seed
FRA	Kristina Mladenovic	POL	Katarzyna Piter	131	1
SVK	Janette Husárová	ESP	Silvia Soler Espinosa	131	2
CZE	Renata Voráčová	CZE	Barbora Záhlavová-Strýcová	137	3
CRO	Mirjana Lučić-Baroni	CZE	Klára Zakopalová	146	4

- ^{1} Rankings are as of June 24, 2013

=== Other entrants ===
The following pairs received wildcards into the doubles main draw:

- (Italy) Corinna Dentoni / (Italy) Anastasia Grymalska
- (Italy) Karin Knapp / (Italy) Flavia Pennetta

== Champions ==
=== Singles ===
- (Italy) Roberta Vinci def. (Italy) Sara Errani, 6–3, 3–6, 6–3

=== Doubles ===
- (France) Kristina Mladenovic / (Poland) Katarzyna Piter def. (Czech Republic) Karolína Plíšková / (Czech Republic) Kristýna Plíšková, 6–1, 5–7, [10–8]
