= Goldwater Women's Tennis Classic =

ITF Women's Tour
- Event name: Phoenix
- Location: Phoenix, Arizona, United States
- Venue: Phoenix Country Club
- Category: ITF Women's Circuit
- Surface: Hard / Outdoor
- Draw: 32S/32Q/16D
- Prize money: US$75,000
- Website: Official Website

The Goldwater Women's Tennis Classic was a tournament for professional female tennis players played on outdoor hardcourts. It was classified as a $75,000 ITF Women's Circuit event, and was held annually in Phoenix, Arizona, from 2009 to 2012.

== Past finals ==
=== Singles ===
Year	Champion	Runner-up	Score
2012	(United States) Madison Keys	(United States) Maria Sanchez	6–3, 7–6^{(7–1)}
2011	(Kazakhstan) Sesil Karatantcheva	(Portugal) Michelle Larcher de Brito	6–1, 7–5
2010	(United States) Varvara Lepchenko	(United States) Melanie Oudin	6–3, 7–6^{(7–5)}
2009	(United States) Varvara Lepchenko	(New Zealand) Sacha Jones	6–0, 6–0

=== Doubles ===
Year	Champions	Runners-up	Score
2012	(United States) Jacqueline Cako (United States) Natalie Pluskota	(Canada) Eugenie Bouchard (Norway) Ulrikke Eikeri	6–3, 2–6, [10–4]
2011	(United States) Jamie Hampton (Croatia) Ajla Tomljanović	(United States) Maria Sanchez (United States) Yasmin Schnack	3–6, 6–3, [10–6]
2010	(Ukraine) Tetiana Luzhanska (United States) CoCo Vandeweghe	(United States) Julia Boserup (United States) Sloane Stephens	7–5, 6–4
2009	(Canada) Sharon Fichman (United States) Mashona Washington	(Canada) Marie-Ève Pelletier (Georgia (country)) Anna Tatishvili	4–6, 6–4, [10–8]
