= 2011 Internazionali Femminili di Palermo =

- Date: 11–18 July
- Edition: 24th
- Category: WTA International
- Draw: 32S / 16D
- Prize money: $220,000
- Surface: Clay / outdoor
- Location: Palermo, Italy
- Venue: Country Time Club

Champions

Singles
- (Spain) Anabel Medina Garrigues

Doubles
- (Italy) Sara Errani / (Italy) Roberta Vinci
- Internazionali Femminili di Palermo

The 2011 Internazionali Femminili di Palermo was a professional women's tennis tournament played on clay courts. It was the 24th edition of the tournament which was part of the WTA International category of the 2011 WTA Tour. It took place in Palermo, Italy between 11 and 18 July 2011. Fifth-seeded Anabel Medina Garrigues won the singles title.

== WTA entrants ==
=== Seeds ===
Country	Player	Rank^{1}	Seed
ITA	Flavia Pennetta	21	1
ITA	Roberta Vinci	25	2
ITA	Sara Errani	35	3
CZE	Klára Zakopalová	36	4
ESP	Anabel Medina Garrigues	43	5
BUL	Tsvetana Pironkova	48	6
SVN	Polona Hercog	53	7
CZE	Petra Cetkovská	55	8

- ^{1} Rankings are as of July 4, 2011.

=== Other entrants ===
The following players received wildcards into the singles main draw:

- (Italy) Silvia Albano
- (Italy) Anna Floris
- (Italy) Anastasia Grymalska

The following players received entry from the qualifying draw:

- (Russia) Elena Bovina
- (Kazakhstan) Sesil Karatantcheva
- (Italy) Karin Knapp
- (Croatia) Ani Mijačika

The following player received entry from a lucky loser spot:

- (Spain) Lara Arruabarrena-Vecino

== Finals ==
=== Singles ===
(Spain) Anabel Medina Garrigues defeated (Slovenia) Polona Hercog, 6–3, 6–2.

- It was Medina Garrigues' second title of the year and 11th of her career. It was her fifth win at Palermo, also winning in 2001, 2004, 2005, and 2006.

=== Doubles ===
(Italy) Sara Errani / (Italy) Roberta Vinci defeated (Czech Republic) Andrea Hlaváčková / (Czech Republic) Klára Zakopalová, 7–5, 6–1.
