= Silvia Albano (tennis player) =

Italian tennis player

- Country (sports): Italy
- Residence: Italy
- Born: 12 September 1994 (age 31) Palermo, Italy
- Retired: Active
- Plays: Right-handed
- Prize money: $ 2,559

Singles
- Career record: 7–10
- Career titles: 0 WTA, 0 ITF
- Highest ranking: 954 (25 October 2010)
- Current ranking: 1012 (4 July 2011)

Doubles
- Career record: 3–4
- Career titles: 0 WTA, 0 ITF
- Highest ranking: No. 941 (30 August 2010)
- Current ranking: NR
- Last updated on: 4 July 2011.

Silvia Albano (born 12 September 1994) is a professional Italian tennis player. On 25 October 2010 she reached her highest WTA singles ranking of 954, whilst her best doubles ranking was 941 on 30 August 2010.
