= Sesil Karatantcheva =

Bulgarian tennis player (born 1989)

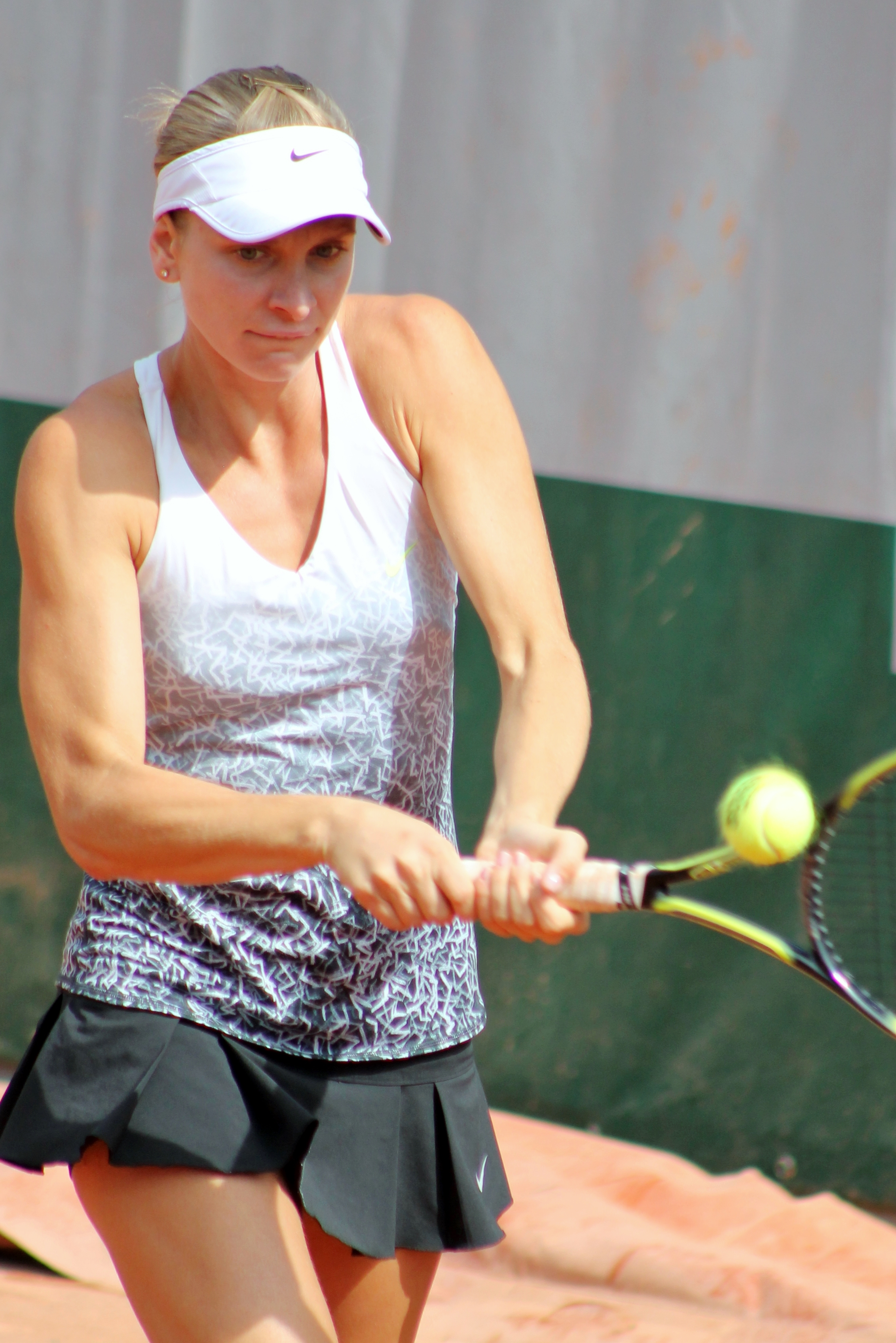
- Karatantcheva at the 2015 French Open
- Country (sports): Bulgaria (2003–2009, 2014–); Kazakhstan (2009–2014)
- Residence: Sofia, Bulgaria
- Born: 8 August 1989 (age 36) Sofia, Bulgaria
- Height: 1.71 m (5 ft 7 in)
- Turned pro: 2003
- Retired: September 2023 (last match played)
- Plays: Right (two-handed backhand)
- Prize money: US$1,405,232

Singles
- Career record: 420–309
- Career titles: 0 WTA, 9 ITF
- Highest ranking: No. 35 (7 November 2005)

Grand Slam singles results
- Australian Open: 2R (2009)
- French Open: QF (2005)
- Wimbledon: 2R (2005)
- US Open: 2R (2005)

Doubles
- Career record: 26–46
- Career titles: 0
- Highest ranking: No. 154 (19 April 2010)

Grand Slam doubles results
- Wimbledon: 1R (2005)
- US Open: 1R (2005)

Team competitions
- Fed Cup: 20–13 (singles 13–5)
- Last updated on: 30 April 2026.

Sesil Radoslavova Karatantcheva (Bulgarian: Сесил Радославова Каратанчева; born 8 August 1989) is a Bulgarian former professional tennis player. On 7 November 2005, she reached her best singles ranking of world No. 35. On 19 April 2010, she peaked at No. 154 in the doubles rankings. In her career, she won nine singles titles on the ITF Women's Circuit.

Karatantcheva is perhaps best known for reaching the quarterfinals of the 2005 French Open, upsetting seven-time Grand Slam champion Venus Williams en route.

== Tennis career ==
She began playing tennis at the age of five. In 2001, 12-year-old Karatantcheva won the Orange Bowl tournament for her age group, defeating Alisa Kleybanova in the final. Early in her playing days, she trained for approximately six months at the famous IMG Academy of Nick Bollettieri.

=== 2003–2004: Early career ===
Karatantcheva played her first professional tournament in September 2003 in Sofia, Bulgaria at the age of 14. As an unranked qualifier the next week, she defeated the No. 1, 2, and 3 seeds en route to her first professional tournament title at a small ITF tournament in Volos, Greece. Karatantcheva went on to win two other ITF titles in 2003. In 2004, Karatantcheva began her season at the WTA tournament in Indian Wells, where she defeated Alexandra Stevenson in the first, and upset the 17th seed Magüi Serna in the second round. In an interview prior to her match against 16th seed Maria Sharapova, Karatantcheva claimed that Sharapova had skipped a hitting session with her a few weeks earlier in Florida, and began a war of words with the Russian.

Sharapova then defeated Karatantcheva in three sets in the third round. On April 19, she played her first match for the Bulgaria Fed Cup team. Because of her age, Karatantcheva was restricted in the number of tournaments she was able to play. In August, she reached the quarterfinals of a WTA tournament in Vancouver, British Columbia, and qualified for the US Open, before losing to eventual champion Svetlana Kuznetsova in the first round. Karatantcheva also reached the quarterfinals of the WTA tournament in Québec City, and captured another ITF tournament in December at Palm Beach Gardens. In 2004 she became the French Open junior champion without losing a set, defeating Romanian Mădălina Gojnea in the final.

=== 2005: Breakthrough and first French Open quarterfinal ===
The 2005 season was Karatantcheva's breakthrough season. She started off the year at the tournament in Gold Coast, Australia by qualifying, and then defeating the tournament's No. 7 seed Elena Likhovtseva before falling in the quarterfinals. At 15 years and 5 months, she qualified for the 2005 Australian Open, losing to the No. 4 seed Maria Sharapova in the first round.

Her most successful tournament to date was at the 2005 Roland Garros where Karatantcheva defeated the No. 19 seed Shinobu Asagoe in the second round, and then stunned the world with her victory over the No. 11 seed and former world number one Venus Williams in the third round. After defeating Emmanuelle Gagliardi, she fell to Likhovtseva in the quarterfinals. Karatantcheva became the youngest female to reach the quarterfinals of a Grand Slam tournament since Martina Hingis, who was 15 years and 4 months old in 1996 at the Australian Open. At Wimbledon, she lost to Sharapova once again, being able to win just one game. In 2005, Karatantcheva also won a European club championship in Rennes as a member of the Cherno More Elite team (Bulgarian: Черно море Елит). Her teammates were Virginiya Trifonova, Maria Penkova and Tsvetana Pironkova. At the end of the year, Karatantcheva came up eighth in the Bulgarian Sportsperson of the Year rankings, earning 676 points. She was also honoured by the Bulgarian Tennis Federation as the "Best female tennis player of the year".

On December 20, 2005, the French sports newspaper L'Équipe reported that Karatantcheva had failed a drug test earlier in the year at Roland Garros (after the 1/4 final match against Likhovtseva), and that she had appeared in front of a three-person panel of judges to explain the results. The newspaper claims that Karatantcheva said she was pregnant at the time of the test, which would explain the high levels of nandrolone in her system. Karatantcheva has denied all allegations, saying "I am shocked. I have not appeared before judges of the international federation."

=== 2006–2007: Doping scandal and two-year suspension ===
On 11 January 2006, the ITF issued a two-year ban after two positive drug tests for nandrolone. While Karatantcheva has claimed she was pregnant at the time of one of the tests, another laboratory carried out a pregnancy test on her urine sample, and it tested negative. On 3 July 2006, the Court of Arbitration for Sport denied her appeal to overturn the ban with the argument that said nandrolone was found in concentrations which were inconsistent with the normal levels for that stage of pregnancy.

Karatantcheva did not play any matches in 2006 or 2007 following her drug ban. She mainly trained in Pravets.

=== 2008: Back to the WTA Tour ===
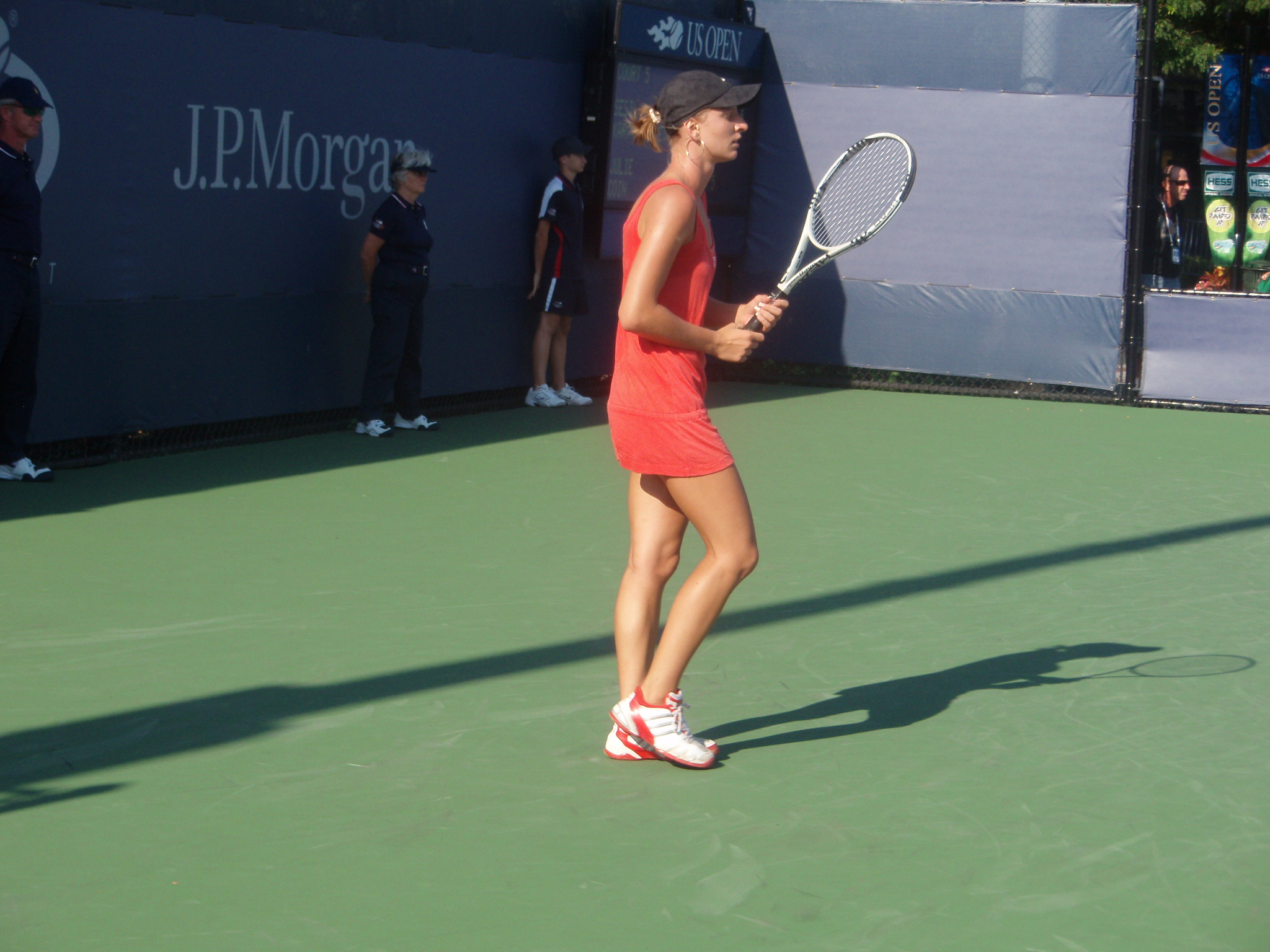
Karatantcheva at the 2008 US Open

Karatantcheva's first match after the ban was in a pre-qualification tournament for a wildcard into the $25k tournament in Surprise, Arizona. She won three matches in one day to win the event and thus won a wildcard for the qualifying draw, in which she beat Susanna Lingman, Maria Kondratieva, and Kristína Kučová. In the main draw, Karatantcheva beat the fifth seed Sunitha Rao in three sets in the first round, and Robin Stephenson in the second round. In the quarterfinals, Karatantcheva beat Magdaléna Rybáriková in two sets, and in the semifinals she defeated the second seed Viktoriya Kutuzova. In the finals, Sesil played a tough three-set match and overcame the eighth seed American Angela Haynes.

In late January, still unranked, she entered another $25k tournament at La Quinta, and again battled through three rounds of qualifying into the main draw, despite a scare in her qualifying match against American player Stacia Fonseca, who took the first set. Having fended off a spirited challenge from second-seeded Angelika Bachmann in the first round of the main draw, she made light work of subsequent opponents en route to the semifinals, where for the second tournament in succession she was scheduled to play Viktoriya Kutuzova. This time, the match ran to three sets, but Karatantcheva ultimately prevailed in three sets. In the final, Karatantcheva defeated the third seed Sandra Klösel.

Karatantcheva attracted criticism from the Bulgarian tennis federation for competing at La Quinta in preference to participating in Bulgaria's Federation Cup tie scheduled the same week. She was accused of breach of contract and threatened with a fine, but the Bulgarian teenager stood by her decision, which she had taken on the grounds that it was proving extremely difficult for her to gain entry even to low-level tournaments following the loss of all her ranking points and any right to protected ranking status after her ban, so she needed to work at re-establishing herself at least in the mid-hundreds of the WTA rankings as a matter of priority before tending to national team commitments.

In February, the Bulgarian was awarded a wildcard into the $75k Midland Classic, but her winning streak came to an abrupt end as she was defeated in the first round by qualifier Valérie Tétreault of Canada, who had raced through the three qualifying rounds for the loss of just nine games, five of them against former top 50 star Mirjana Lučić. Karatantcheva then attempted to qualify for the WTA Tier III event in Memphis but lost in the first round of qualifying to Hana Šromová of the Czech Republic.

In early March, she qualified for the $50k Las Vegas event including victories over Amber Liu and Elena Bovina. However, she lost in the first round of the main draw to wildcarded American Madison Brengle. She also received a wildcard into the qualifying event for the Tier I event at Indian Wells but lost in the first round of qualifying to Evgeniya Rodina. Her luck changed however, when, at the end of March, she managed to qualify and reach the final of the $50k event in Latina, losing to Iveta Benešová in straight sets.

In April, she reached the quarterfinals of the $25k event at Civitavecchia, losing to Betina Jozami of Argentina in straight sets. Her route through to the final of the $25k event in Palm Beach Gardens, Florida, included a victory over seventh-seeded Lauren Albanese. Argentinian Soledad Esperón beat her in two sets in the final.

In May, she played her first WTA main-draw match since her suspension in Fes, Morocco against Elena Baltacha which she won in straight sets. In June, Sesil reached the quarterfinals of the $75k tournament in Marseille. In the qualifications of Wimbledon, she lost in the second round to Magdaléna Rybáriková from Slovakia.

=== 2009: Representing Kazakhstan ===
On 10 January 2009, it was announced that Karatantcheva would take Kazakh citizenship and compete for the Kazakhstan Fed Cup team. She did not participate in Fed Cup competitions for Kazakhstan during 2009.

In tournament play in January, she reached the second round (as a qualifier) at the Brisbane International, defeating top 50 player Iveta Benešová along the way and then backed it up by playing (and winning) her first main-draw major match (again as a qualifier) at the Australian Open. She then lost in the second round to Peng Shuai. This was to be her last main tournament playing for Bulgaria until 2015.

=== 2010: First WTA Tour semifinal ===
At the Pattaya Open, Karatantcheva reached her first WTA semifinal, before losing to Tamarine Tanasugarn. Karatantcheva qualified for the Birmingham Classic where she reached the quarterfinals winning five matches in a row, upsetting Yaroslava Shvedova in straight sets in the second round, before losing to second seed Maria Sharapova.

=== 2011 ===
Karatantcheva failed to qualify in Brisbane, Melbourne, Pattaya, and Monterrey. She reached the final of a $25k event in Clearwater, Florida, losing to Ajla Tomljanović. At the French Open, she lost to Olga Govortsova in the final round of qualifying. After barely missing out on qualifying for the Birmingham Classic, Karatantcheva fell to Arina Rodionova in the first round of qualifying of Wimbledon. She took a two-week break following Wimbledon.

She returned at the Palermo Ladies Open, where she qualified for the main draw. She drew second seed Roberta Vinci in the first round. Although Karatantcheva played well she was beaten in straight sets. She then competed in two $100k events – in Bucharest and Astana, losing in the early round of both tournaments.

She then failed to qualify for the US Open, marking the first year since 2009 that she had not competed in the main draw of a major. Her poor form continued, losing in the first or second rounds of four more ITF tournaments.

She began to improve her game by advancing to the semifinals of a $50k event in Troy, Alabama. She then competed in a $25k tournament in Rock Hill, losing in the quarterfinals. Karatantcheva then played at the $50k event in Grapevine, Texas, where she advanced to the final, losing to eighth seed Kurumi Nara in three sets. Following her performance in Grapevine, Sesil achieved her best result of the year by winning a $75k tournament, the Goldwater Women's Tennis Classic, in Phoenix, Arizona, the biggest title of her career. She won the title dropping only two sets the entire tournament, defeating a seeded player along the way. Karatantcheva's recent change in form has propelled her well back inside the top 200 and she established herself as one of the leading Kazakh players.

=== 2012 ===
Karatantcheva began the year ranked World No. 139. She failed to qualify in Brisbane and at the Australian Open. She then competed in the $100k tournament in Cali. Unseeded, she advanced to the semifinals before losing to Mandy Minella. She then played at the Copa Sony Ericsson Colsanitas and Monterrey Open. Although she qualified for both, she lost in the first round to Catalina Castaño and Yaroslava Shvedova, respectively. Sesil then qualified for the Abierto Mexicano Telcel. Although she put up a fight, Sesil was defeated by sixth seed Johanna Larsson in three sets, in the first round. Karatantcheva committed 18 double faults during the match – almost an all-time high in WTA history. Karatantcheva then competed at the Indian Wells Open and the Miami Open, losing in the first round of qualifying for both tournaments. Despite the losses, she rebounded and reached the final of a $50k event, losing to Arantxa Rus.

Karatantcheva headed to Portugal for the Estoril Open. In the first round of qualifications, she drew Italian Maria Elena Camerin, whom she defeated in three tough sets. In the second round of qualifying, however, she was defeated by Mariana Duque-Marino, despite the fact she was leading with a break in the deciding set. Karatantcheva then lost in the first round of qualifying of the Madrid Open. At the French Open, she lost in the final round of qualifying to Alexa Glatch. However, she was offered a spot in the main draw after the withdrawal of Vera Zvonareva. She played Tímea Babos in the first round and won in two easy sets. This was Karatantcheva's first Grand Slam tournament main-draw appearance in almost 2 1/2 years. In the second round Karatantcheva took the first set against Carla Suárez Navarro, but subsequently lost the next two and was eliminated from the tournament.

She opened her grass-court season at Birmingham where she entered the qualifying draw and defeated local girl Francesca Stephenson but fell to Thailand's Noppawan Lertcheewakarn in the final round. However, she was offered a place in the main draw as a lucky loser due to the withdrawal of another player. She faced another Thai player, Tamarine Tanasugarn, defeating her in straight sets. Her run was ended in the second round by eighth seed Ekaterina Makarova. She then lost in the final round of qualifying at Wimbledon. Despite the loss, her ranking climbed due to her improved result from 2011.

Karatantcheva then played at the Stanford Classic. She fell in the first round of qualifying. She then qualified for the Premier-level Carlsbad Open. She was points away from winning, but was finally beaten by Melinda Czink in the first round. She then competed at the second annual Washington Open where she lost to Sloane Stephens in the first round. She then continued her hardcourt season at the Rogers Cup in Montreal. As the 18th seed in qualifying, she won three matches for a place in the main draw. In the first round she dismantled Sorana Cîrstea, without losing a single game, in only 43 minutes. Karatantcheva lost to 16th seed Lucie Šafářová in the second round in straight sets. Her ranking climbed to No. 92, her highest ranking since 2005. Karatantcheva then played at the Western & Southern Open, qualifying into the main draw by beating world No. 64 Arantxa Rus and Olga Govortsova. In the first round of the main draw, she won against fellow qualifier Kiki Bertens, but was soundly beaten by former world No. 1, Caroline Wozniacki, in the second round. Her next tournament was the US Open. Ranked world No. 85, she was given direct entrance into the main draw. She lost to Lourdes Domínguez Lino in the first round.

Following the US Open, Karatantcheva competed in Québec and Seoul, losing in the first round of both tournaments. She continued by then losing in the qualifying draw of the next four events in Tokyo, Beijing, Linz, and Moscow. Her final tournament of the year was in Phoenix, where she was the defending champion and second seed. She suffered a shock straight set loss to world No. 217 Shelby Rogers in the first round. Despite the loss, she ended the year at No. 93, her first year-end ranking inside the top 100 since 2005.

=== 2013 ===
Karatantcheva began the season at the Australian Open, losing to 6th seed Li Na in the first round. She next played for Kazakhstan in Fed Cup. Placed in the Asia/Oceania Zone Group I in Astana, Karatantcheva played with Galina Voskoboeva to beat Rutuja Bhosale and Ankita Raina, securing Kazakhstan's 3–0 sweep over India. Following Kazakhstan's win over Thailand, they defeated Uzbekistan in the Group I promotional play-off. Their win over Uzbekistan has catapulted Kazakhstan into the World Group II play-offs in April for the first time ever. Karatantcheva then played at the WTA 125,000 event in Cali, losing in the quarterfinals to Catalina Castaño in three sets. She then lost in Memphis qualifying before losing to Francesca Schiavone in the second round at Acapulco. Karatantcheva then qualified for the Indian Wells Open, but lost to Lara Arruabarrena in the first round. At the Miami Open, she entered the qualifying draw and defeated Anastasia Rodionova in the first round, saving two match points and battling almost three hours before winning. She lost in the final round to Sílvia Soler Espinosa. Karatantcheva closed the hard court season with a first round loss in Osprey to Olga Puchkova.

Karatantcheva opened her clay court season by falling in the qualifying rounds in Charleston and Oeiras. She then won only two matches in her next four tournaments before heading to Wimbledon, where she lost in the final round of qualifying to Austrian Yvonne Meusburger in a close three-set match. Following Wimbledon, Karatantcheva played two more clay-court events in Budapest and Båstad, losing to Simona Halep and Serena Williams, respectively.

After skipping the first week of the US Open Series, Karatantcheva entered the Southern California Open in Carlsbad. She played the qualifying draw and won three consecutive matches against Chieh-yu Hsu, Katalin Marosi, and Ivana Lisjak for a spot in the main draw. There, she drew Julia Görges and defeated the world No. 42 in straight sets. She advanced to the second round but lost to eventual champion Samantha Stosur, winning only five games. Despite the loss, her win over Görges was the biggest win of her season. Her next tournament was the Rogers Cup in Toronto where she fell in the first round of qualifying. Her ranking plummeted to No. 163 as a result of her failure to defend 2012's second round points. At the US Open, Karatantcheva played the qualifying draw and won two matches before losing out to Mirjana Lučić-Baroni in straight sets.

Following the US Open, Karatantcheva played at the Challenge Bell, again entering the qualifying draw. She beat Élisabeth Fournier, Petra Rampre, and CoCo Vandeweghe to enter the main draw. She played fellow qualifier Amra Sadiković and beat the Swiss in straight sets. In the second round, she lost to fifth seeded local hope Eugenie Bouchard. She returned to the United States to compete in two ITF Circuit events in Albuquerque and Las Vegas, losing in the first round of both tournaments. Her final events of the season saw her lose in Linz qualifying, bow out to Karin Knapp in the first round of the Luxembourg Open, and lose in the first round of an ITF event in Nantes.

=== 2014 ===
Karatantcheva made her 2014 debut at the Hobart International, losing in the first round of qualifying to Belgian Alison Van Uytvanck. At the Australian Open, she was seeded 22nd in the qualifying draw and lost there in the first round to Duan Yingying in straight sets. For Kazakhstan in 2014 Fed Cup in the Group I final position play-off, Karatantcheva played Liu Fangzhou and defeated the Chinese in three sets, ultimately sending Kazakhstan into third place in the Asia/Oceania Group I Zone. After that, Karatantcheva competed in Midland, losing out to young American Victoria Duval, and then traveled to Brazil to compete at the Rio Open and Brasil Tennis Cup. In Rio, she fell in the qualifying competition to Verónica Cepede Royg. In Florianópolis, however, she was more successful with qualifying wins over world No. 95 Anabel Medina Garrigues and Alexandra Panova, the latter match lasting over three hours. Her run was ended in the first round by Kiki Bertens.

Karatantcheva proceeded to compete in Osprey, but lost to Gioia Barbieri in the first round. At the Family Circle Cup, she played qualifying and overcame Sanaz Marand before bowing out to Alla Kudryavtseva. She next played at the Dothan Pro Tennis Classic, but suffered another loss, going down to world No. 125 Michelle Larcher de Brito in the first round. Karatantcheva's final clay-court event in the United States was in Charlottesville, in which she was able to pick up form by reaching the quarterfinals. For the second consecutive year, she entered the Nürnberger Versicherungscup, but was defeated in the qualifying draw by German Nina Zander. At the French Open, she won one match in the qualifying draw but would progress no further, as she was eliminated by Laura Siegemund in what was a tough three-set match. She would then compete in Marseille, advancing to the quarterfinals before going down to Johanna Larsson in a final-set tiebreak. Karatantcheva elected to skip all grass court events before Wimbledon, and suffered another Grand Slam defeat, this time at the hands of young Estonian Anett Kontaveit in the second round of qualifying.

She entered the inaugural Bucharest Open, winning three qualifying matches before losing to Sílvia Soler Espinosa in the first round. Karatantcheva then played qualifying at the İstanbul Cup but was beaten in the first round by Ana Konjuh of Croatia. She returned to the ITF Circuit at the $50k Powiat Poznański Open in Sobota, advancing to the final having only dropped a set, but suffered a disappointing three-set loss there after winning the first set. It was her first final since April 2012. At US Open qualifying she was beaten in the first round by Melanie Oudin.

Karatantcheva returned to action at the Canadian Open as a direct entrant in the main draw. She began with a win over Sanaz Marand in the first round and squared off against third seeded Kristina Mladenovic in the second, edging the Frenchwoman in a match that lasted over two-and-a-half hours. Karatantcheva subsequently moved on to the quarterfinals but was defeated there by Mirjana Lučić-Baroni, who would go on to win the tournament.

In October, Karatantcheva announced that she had decided to play for her home country Bulgaria again. She and her father first made the decision known to the Bulgarian public in an interview for TV7. Her switch back to Bulgaria was finalized a few weeks later and she reappeared under the Bulgarian flag in the 20 October WTA rankings.

=== 2015: Representing Bulgaria once again ===
Karatancheva's first tournament of the year was the Auckland Open, where she lost in the third round of the qualifying competition to Urszula Radwańska. Karatancheva also failed to qualify for the Australian Open, losing in the second qualifying round to Alexandra Panova. In February, she participated at the Abierto Mexicano where she was defeated in straight sets in the third qualifying round by Lucie Hradecká, but nonetheless reached the main tournament as a lucky loser. Karatantcheva then eliminated Marie Bouzková, Kiki Bertens and Monica Puig to secure herself a place in the semifinals for the second time in her career. She subsequently lost to fifth seed Timea Bacsinszky in two sets. Next, she played at Monterrey Open, where she lost in the first round of qualifying. Despite the setback, Karatantcheva was nonetheless able to stay on course towards improving her ranking by qualifying for the main phase of the Indian Wells Open shortly after that. In the first round, she managed a two-set victory over compatriot and friend Tsvetana Pironkova. This was the first time since 2000 that two Bulgarian women had met in the main draw of a WTA tournament. Karatantcheva then suffered a defeat in straight sets to CoCo Vandeweghe. Next, Karatantcheva qualified for the main draw of Miami Open, where she reached the second round, defeating Lauren Davis, then ranked No. 61, in the first round in straight sets, and losing to 21st seed Garbiñe Muguruza. Her ranking improved to 109. Next, at the Family Circle Cup in Charleston, she qualified for the main draw, beating Arantxa Rus and Louisa Chirico along the way, and lost in the first round to ninth seed Samantha Stosur. At the French Open, Karatantcheva was seeded 3rd in the qualifying draw and she qualified for the main draw. In the first round she defeated former world No. 1, Jelena Janković, in straight sets, which allowed her to return to the top 100 in the WTA rankings. Then, she lost in the second round to Irina Falconi in three sets. Due to her improved ranking, Karatantcheva entered the main draw at Wimbledon. In the first round, she lost to Sílvia Soler Espinosa in a tight three-setter match. At the US Open, Karatantcheva suffered a 1–6, 2–6 loss to Belinda Bencic from Switzerland.

=== 2016 ===
The new season began with a disappointment at Brisbane, where she lost in the first round of the qualifying draw. She played at Sydney, starting once again from the qualifications, defeating Yaroslava Shvedova (after taking a 4–1 lead in the first set and her opponent retiring) in the first round, but then succumbing in straight sets to Magdaléna Rybáriková. In the qualifying for the Australian Open, Karatantcheva was seeded fourth. However, she was unable to pass the first hurdle, being defeated 6–2, 6–0 by Jessica Pegula. Karatantcheva did not manage to reach the main draw of the 2016 French Open, losing to Maryna Zanevska in three sets after taking the first one in the second round of qualifying, for which she was not among the seeds. Her downturn in fortunes continued in Wimbledon, where she suffered elimination in the first round of the qualifying competition at the hands of Shérazad Reix in a hard-fought match that was decided in three sets. In the qualifying draw for the US Open, Karatantcheva posted a win in three sets against Rebecca Šramková in the first round, but was then defeated by Elise Mertens in another three-setter.

=== 2017 ===
Karatantcheva did not get past the first hurdle in the qualifying for the Australian Open, being on the receiving end of a 6–3, 6–2 defeat by Anna Blinkova. After not participating in the qualifying competitions for the French Open and Wimbledon, in late August 2017 she entered the one for the US Open, where she convincingly defeated Arantxa Rus in the first round, but then lost in a dramatic three-setter match (that was decided by a tiebreak) against American Claire Liu. In September 2017, Karatantcheva won the title at the Red Rock Pro Open in Las Vegas, defeating compatriot Elitsa Kostova in the final by a score of 6–4, 4–6, 7–5.

=== 2018 ===
Karatantcheva played in the qualifying of the Australian Open, but had to exit in the first round losing 5–7, 6–3, 5–7 to Irina Bara. She was also eliminated in the earliest possible stage of the qualifying draw for the French Open, being on the receiving end of a three-set-loss against Ons Jabeur. The negative trend continued in her first qualifying match for Wimbledon, in which she emerged second best to Mayo Hibi by a score of 6–1, 3–6, 1–6. The qualifying event for the US Open saw a repeat of her previous performances, as Karatantcheva did not get past the first round, being defeated 6–3, 2–6, 6–4 by Italian Martina Trevisan.

=== 2019 ===
Karatantcheva entered the Australian Open qualifying, taking the first set against American Asia Muhammad, but eventually lost the other two. Her luck didn't change in the qualifying draw for Wimbledon when she was defeated in straight sets by Romanian Elena-Gabriela Ruse, at her last tournament for years.

=== 2023: Comeback to the Tour ===
In April, Karatantcheva participated in a $80k tournament in Zaragoza, losing in the first round.

In May, at the French Open, she defeated Fernanda Contreras to reach the second round of qualifying. It was her first qualifying win at a major since she defeated Arantxa Rus at the 2017 US Open, and her first at Roland Garros since beating Zhang Kailin in qualifying in 2016.

In August, in the qualifying for the US Open, Karatantcheva was defeated in three sets by her first-round opponent Arianne Hartono from the Netherlands.

== Personal life ==
She is the daughter of former rower and member of parliament as part of the Bulgarian Business Bloc, Radoslav Karatantchev. He also used to be a member of the Bulgarian Socialist Party and additionally acts as Karatantcheva's coach.

She has three sisters, one of whom, Gabriel Karatantcheva, was active as a professional tennis player from 2014 to 2017. The younger sisters, Lia and Alexa, are also tennis players. Karatantcheva married long-time boyfriend and former footballer Georgi Dolmov in November 2017. On 20 August 2021, she gave birth to her first child.

In 2021, Karatantcheva established her own tennis academy in Sofia.

== Grand Slam performance timeline ==
Key
W	F	SF	QF	#R	RR	Q#	P#	DNQ	A	Z#	PO	G	S	B	NMS	NTI	P	NH

(W) winner; (F) finalist; (SF) semifinalist; (QF) quarterfinalist; (#R) rounds 4, 3, 2, 1; (RR) round-robin stage; (Q#) qualification round; (P#) preliminary round; (DNQ) did not qualify; (A) absent; (Z#) Davis/Fed Cup Zonal Group (with number indication) or (PO) play-off; (G) gold, (S) silver or (B) bronze Olympic/Paralympic medal; (NMS) not a Masters tournament; (NTI) not a Tier I tournament; (P) postponed; (NH) not held; (SR) strike rate (events won / competed); (W–L) win–loss record.
To avoid confusion and double counting, these charts are updated at the conclusion of a tournament or when the player's participation has ended.

Tournament	2003	2004	2005	2008	2009	2010	2011	2012	2013	2014	2015	2016	2017	2018	2019	2020	2023	SR	W–L
Grand Slam tournaments
Australian Open	A	A	1R	A	2R	1R	Q3	Q1	1R	Q1	Q2	Q1	Q1	Q1	Q1	A	A	0 / 4	1–4
French Open	A	A	QF	A	Q2	Q1	Q3	2R	Q2	Q2	2R	Q2	A	Q1	A	A	Q2	0 / 3	6–3
Wimbledon	A	A	2R	Q2	1R	Q2	Q1	Q3	Q3	Q2	1R	Q1	A	Q1	Q1	NH	A	0 / 3	1–3
US Open	A	1R	2R	Q2	Q2	Q3	Q2	1R	Q3	Q1	1R	Q2	Q2	Q1	A	A	Q1	0 / 4	1–4
Win–loss	0–0	0–1	6–4	0–0	1–2	0–1	0–0	1–2	0–1	0–0	1–3	0–0	0–0	0–0	0–0	0–0	0–0	0 / 14	9–14
Career statistics
Year-end ranking	526	127	35	150	134	139	175	93	142	176	109	216	176	238	385	604			

== Junior Grand Slam finals ==
=== Singles: 1 (1 title) ===
Result	Year	Tournament	Surface	Opponent	Score
Win	2004	French Open	Clay	(Romania) Mădălina Gojnea	6–4, 6–0

== WTA Tour finals ==
=== Doubles: 1 (runner–up) ===
Legend Grand Slam WTA 1000 WTA 500 WTA 250 (0–1)	Finals by surface Hard (0–0) Clay (0–1) Grass (0–0) Carpet (0–0)

Result	Date	Tournament	Tier	Surface	Partner	Opponents	Score
Loss	Jul 2008	Gastein Ladies, Austria	Tier III (Note: The WTA Tier III tournaments, WTA Tier IV tournaments and WTA Tier V tournaments were reclassified as WTA International tournaments in 2009 and later as WTA 250 tournaments in 2021.)	Clay	(Serbia) Nataša Zorić	(Czech Republic) Andrea Hlaváčková (Czech Republic) Lucie Hradecká	3–6, 3–6

== ITF Circuit finals ==
=== Singles: 17 (9 titles, 8 runner–ups) ===
Legend $100,000 tournaments $75,000 tournaments $50,000 tournaments $25,000 tournaments $10,000 tournaments	Finals by surface Hard (6–3) Clay (2–5) Grass (0–0) Carpet (1–0)

Result	W–L	Date	Tournament	Tier	Surface	Opponent	Score
Win	1–0	Sep 2003	ITF Volos, Greece	10,000	Carpet	(Bulgaria) Tsvetana Pironkova	6–4, 2–6, 6–2
Loss	1–1	Oct 2003	ITF Carcavelos, Portugal	10,000	Clay	(Hungary) Barbara Pócza	2–6, 0–6
Win	2–1	Oct 2003	ITF Carcavelos, Portugal	10,000	Clay	(Spain) Rosa María Andrés Rodríguez	7–5, 6–3
Win	3–1	Dec 2003	ITF Shenzhen, China	50,000	Hard	(China) Zheng Jie	7–5, 1–6, 6–3
Win	4–1	Dec 2004	Palm Beach Gardens Challenger, U.S.	50,000	Clay	(India) Sania Mirza	3–6, 6–2, 7–5
Win	5–1	Jan 2008	ITF Surprise, United States	25,000	Hard	(United States) Angela Haynes	6–2, 4–6, 6–4
Win	6–1	Feb 2008	ITF La Quinta, United States	25,000	Hard	(Germany) Sandra Klösel	6–4, 7–5
Loss	6–2	Mar 2008	Internazionali di Latina, Italy	50,000	Clay	(Czech Republic) Iveta Benešová	0–6, 2–6
Loss	6–3	Apr 2008	ITF Palm Beach Gardens, U.S.	25,000	Clay	(Argentina) Soledad Esperón	4–6, 1–6
Loss	6–4	Mar 2011	ITF Clearwater, United States	25,000	Hard	(Croatia) Ajla Tomljanović	6–7^{(3–7)}, 3–6
Loss	6–5	Nov 2011	Grapevine Tennis Classic, United States	50,000	Hard	(Japan) Kurumi Nara	6–1, 0–6, 3–6
Win	7–5	Nov 2011	Phoenix Tennis Classic, United States	75,000	Hard	(Portugal) Michelle Larcher de Brito	6–1, 7–5
Loss	7–6	Apr 2012	Osprey Challenger, United States	50,000	Clay	(Netherlands) Arantxa Rus	4–6, 1–6
Loss	7–7	Jul 2014	Powiat Poznański Open, Poland	50,000	Clay	(Slovakia) Kristína Kučová	6–1, 5–7, 3–6
Win	8–7	Sep 2017	Henderson Open, United States	60,000	Hard	(Bulgaria) Elitsa Kostova	6–4, 4–6, 7–5
Loss	8–8	Sep 2018	ITF Templeton Pro, United States	60,000	Hard	(United States) Asia Muhammad	6–2, 4–6, 3–6
Win	9–8	Feb 2019	ITF Surprise, United States	25,000	Hard	(United States) Coco Gauff	5–7, 6–3, 6–1

== Fed Cup participation ==
Sesil Karatantcheva debuted for the Bulgaria Fed Cup team in 2004, winning her singles match in the tie against the Estonia Fed Cup team. Between 2010 and 2014 she competed for the Kazakhstan Fed Cup team. She maintains a 12–5 singles record and a 7–8 doubles record (19–13 overall). In January 2017, Karatantcheva was recalled to the Bulgarian team for the February 2017 Europe/Africa Zone (Group I) matches.

=== Singles (12–5) ===
Edition	Round	Date	Against	Surface	Opponent	W/L	Result
↓ Representing Bulgaria ↓
2004 Europe/Africa Group I	RR	19 April	Estonia	Clay	(Estonia) Kaia Kanepi	W	6–3, 6–3
2004 Europe/Africa Group I	RR	21 April	Greece	Clay	(Greece) Eleni Daniilidou	W	4–6, 6–3, 7–5
2004 Europe/Africa Group I	RR	22 April	Poland	Clay	(Poland) Klaudia Jans-Ignacik	W	6–3, 6–0
2005 Europe/Africa Group I	RR	20 April	South Africa	Clay	(South Africa) Chanelle Scheepers	W	6–1, 6–2
2005 Europe/Africa Group I	RR	21 April	Hungary	Clay	(Hungary) Ágnes Szávay	W	6–4, 6–3
2005 Europe/Africa Group I	PPO	23 April	Netherlands	Clay	(Netherlands) Elise Tamaëla	W	6–1, 6–1
2005 World Group II Play-Offs	PO	9 July	Japan	Hard (i)	(Japan) Akiko Morigami	L	6–2, 6–7^{(4–7)}, 0–6
2005 World Group II Play-Offs	PO	10 July	Japan	Hard (i)	(Japan) Aiko Nakamura	L	4–6, 6–7^{(2–7)}
↓ Representing Kazakhstan ↓
2010 Asia/Oceania Group I	RR	3 February	Chinese Taipei	Hard	(Chinese Taipei) Chang Kai-chen	W	6–4, 6–3
2010 Asia/Oceania Group I	RR	4 February	Thailand	Hard	(Thailand) Suchanan Viratprasert	W	6–4, 6–2
2010 Asia/Oceania Group I	RR	5 February	Uzbekistan	Hard	(Uzbekistan) Nigina Abduraimova	W	6–2, 6–2
2011 Asia/Oceania Group I	RR	31 January	South Korea	Hard	(South Korea) Kim So-jung	L	4–6, 5–7
2011 Asia/Oceania Group I	RR	2 February	Chinese Taipei	Hard	(Chinese Taipei) Chan Chin-wei	W	7–6^{(10–8)}, 6–2
2011 Asia/Oceania Group I	RR	4 February	Japan	Hard	(Japan) Ayumi Morita	L	4–6, 6–7^{(5–7)}
2011 Asia/Oceania Group I	PO3	6 February	Thailand	Hard	(Thailand) Noppawan Lertcheewakarn	L	3–6, 3–6
2012 Asia/Oceania Group I	RR	2 February	Indonesia	Hard	(Indonesia) Ayu Fani Damayanti	W	6–1, 6–1
2014 Asia/Oceania Group I	PO3	8 February	China	Hard (i)	(China) Liu Fangzhou	W	4–6, 6–1, 6–1

=== Doubles (7–8) ===
Edition	Round	Date	Partner	Against	Surface	Opponents	W/L	Result
↓ Representing Bulgaria ↓
2004 Europe/Africa Group I	RR	19 April	Maria Penkova	Estonia	Clay	(Estonia) Maret Ani (Estonia) Margit Rüütel	L	5–7, 6–3, 4–6
2004 Europe/Africa Group I	RR	22 April	Maria Penkova	Poland	Clay	(Poland) Karolina Kosińska (Poland) Alicja Rosolska	L	6–3, 6–7^{(1–7)}, 5–7
2004 Europe/Africa Group I	PPO	24 April	Maria Penkova	Serbia and Montenegro	Clay	(Serbia and Montenegro) Ana Timotić (Serbia and Montenegro) Dragana Zarić	W	6–4, 2–6, 6–3
2005 Europe/Africa Group I	RR	20 April	Magdalena Maleeva	South Africa	Clay	(South Africa) Lizaan du Plessis (South Africa) Alicia Pillay	W	6–3, 6–2
2005 Europe/Africa Group I	RR	21 April	Magdalena Maleeva	Hungary	Clay	(Hungary) Virág Németh (Hungary) Ágnes Szávay	L	6–4, 3–6, 1–6
↓ Representing Kazakhstan ↓
2010 Asia/Oceania Group I	PO3	6 February	Zarina Diyas	South Korea	Hard	(South Korea) Kim So-jung (South Korea) Lee Jin-a	L	6–1, 1–6, 5–7
2011 Asia/Oceania Group I	RR	2 February	Galina Voskoboeva	Chinese Taipei	Hard	(Chinese Taipei) Juan Ting-fei (Chinese Taipei) Miao Yui-lynn	W	6–2, 6–1
2011 Asia/Oceania Group I	PO3	6 February	Galina Voskoboeva	Thailand	Hard	(Thailand) Nicha Lertpitaksinchai (Thailand) Nungnadda Wannasuk	L	2–6, ret.
2012 Asia/Oceania Group I	RR	2 February	Galina Voskoboeva	Indonesia	Hard	(Indonesia) Jessy Rompies (Indonesia) Lavinia Tananta	W	6–1, 7–6^{(7–3)}
2012 Asia/Oceania Group I	RR	3 February	Yaroslava Shvedova	Thailand	Hard	(Thailand) Nungnadda Wannasuk (Thailand) Varatchaya Wongteanchai	L	4–6, 6–3, 4–6
2013 Asia/Oceania Group I	RR	6 February	Galina Voskoboeva	India	Hard	(India) Rutuja Bhosale (India) Ankita Raina	W	6–3, 6–1
2013 World Group II Play-offs	PO	21 April	Galina Voskoboeva	France	Hard (i)	(France) Caroline Garcia (France) Kristina Mladenovic	L	2–6, 5–7
↓ Representing Bulgaria ↓
2017 Europe/Africa Group I	RR	8 February	Elitsa Kostova	Israel	Hard	(Israel) Julia Glushko (Israel) Shelly Krolitzky	W	2–6, 6–3, 7–5
2017 Europe/Africa Group I	RR	9 February	Elitsa Kostova	Serbia	Hard	(Serbia) Bojana Marinković (Serbia) Dejana Radanović	W	6–1, 6–3
2017 Europe/Africa Group I	RR	10 February	Isabella Shinikova	Estonia	Hard	(Estonia) Anett Kontaveit (Estonia) Maileen Nuudi	L	3–6, 5–7

== See also ==
- List of sportspeople sanctioned for doping offences
