= Teodora Mirčić =

Serbian tennis player (born 1988)

Teodora Mirčić Теодора Мирчић
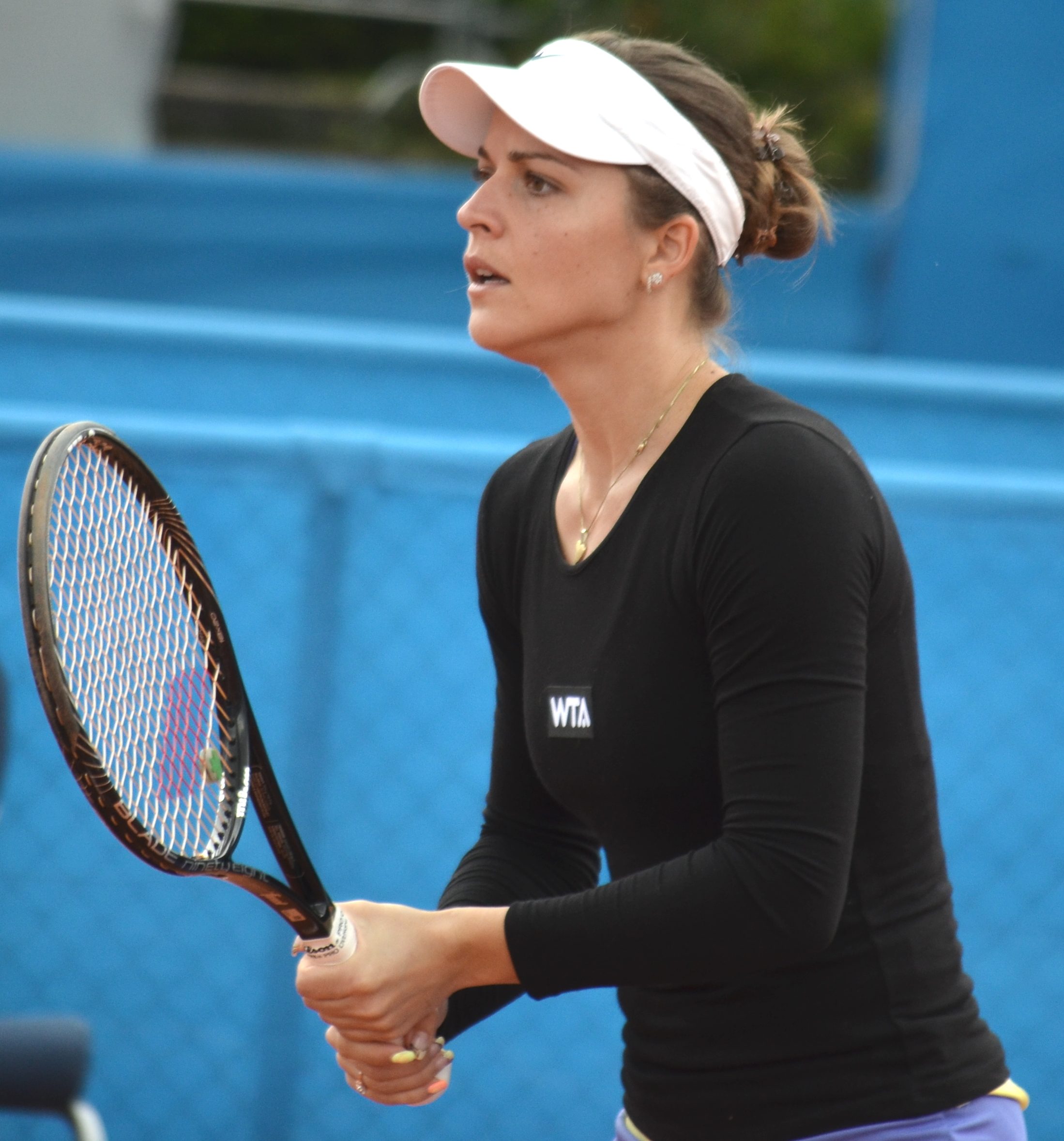
- Country (sports): FR Yugoslavia (2000–2003); Serbia and Montenegro (2003–2006); Serbia (2006–2014)
- Residence: Sarasota, Florida, U.S.
- Born: 3 March 1988 (age 38) Belgrade, SR Serbia, SFR Yugoslavia
- Height: 1.70 m (5 ft 7 in)
- Turned pro: 2002
- Retired: 2014
- Plays: Right-handed (two-handed backhand)
- Prize money: $151,315

Singles
- Career record: 263–221
- Career titles: 3 ITF
- Highest ranking: No. 249 (16 June 2008)

Doubles
- Career record: 258–144
- Career titles: 33 ITF
- Highest ranking: No. 125 (5 May 2014)

Team competitions
- Fed Cup: 0–3

Teodora Mirčić (Serbian Cyrillic: Теодора Мирчић, pronounced [teodǒːra mîːrtʃitɕ]; born 3 March 1988) is a Serbian former professional tennis player. Over her career, she won three singles and 33 doubles titles on the ITF Circuit, and also played for the Serbia Fed Cup team.

== Personal life ==
Teodora Mirčić was born to Miomir and Draginja Mirčić in Belgrade, and also has a brother, Radovan. A great fan of sports, she cites hardcourt as her favourite surface, and Roger Federer and Monica Seles her idols. Mirčić began training tennis aged 8 at Belgrade's tennis club As. She trained at the Nick Bollettieri Tennis Academy in Bradenton, Florida with a full scholarship, and currently resides in Sarasota, Florida. She also earned a bachelor's degree in Psychology at Indiana East University.

== Tennis career ==
Teodora Mirčić was one of the best doubles players Serbia has had on the pro tour. She is the only female Serbian tennis player to win thirty-three ITF doubles titles. In singles, Mirčić was always ranked amongst the top 5 in the country. As a young player, she started competing on both WTA Tour and ITF Circuit tournaments. She also captured three ITF singles titles. As a young player, Mirčić played her first WTA Tour qualifying in 2005, at the Budapest Grand Prix. She then earned a wildcard for the 2006 Budapest Grand Prix, losing to Kaia Kanepi in the first round. In 2009, Mirčić played qualifying for two WTA Tour events, the Morocco Open and the Swedish Open. At the 2011 Budapest Grand Prix, she played singles qualifying, losing to Aleksandra Krunić in the second round. Along with Laura Thorpe, Mirčić competed in doubles at the 2011 Palermo Ladies Open. The pair defeated fourth seeds Sorana Cîrstea and Andreja Klepač in a super tiebreak in the first round and later reached the semifinals. She lost to Karin Knapp in the last round of singles qualifying. Mirčić reached another doubles semifinal at a WTA event, partnering Veronika Kapshay in Bad Gastein (July 2013), as well as a quarterfinal at the Tashkent Open.

Mirčić joined the Serbia Fed Cup team in 2008, playing with Jelena Janković, Ana Ivanovic and Ana Jovanović against Poland. Ivanovic defeated Urszula Radwańska, and then Janković defeated Agnieszka Radwańska, securing Serbia a place in World Group II. In the dead rubber, Mirčić and Jovanović lost to Klaudia Jans and Alicja Rosolska in straight sets. The same Serbian team played against Croatia. Mirčić lost her singles match, but Janković, Ivanovic and Jovanović defeated their opponents, with Serbia winning the tie 3–2. Mirčić and Jovanović also played a doubles match, but retired for a final 4–1 result. Mirčić has not played in the Fed Cup since 2008.

== ITF Circuit finals ==
$50,000 tournaments
$25,000 tournaments
$10,000 tournaments

=== Singles: 6 (3–3) ===
Result	No.	Date	Tournament	Surface	Opponent	Score
Loss	1.	11 July 2004	ITF Felixstowe, United Kingdom	Grass	(United Kingdom) Amanda Janes	2–6, 1–6
Win	1.	1 July 2007	ITF Sarajevo, Bosnia and Herzegovina	Clay	(Serbia) Karolina Jovanović	6–3, 6–3
Loss	2.	27 October 2007	ITF Saint-Denis, France	Hard	(France) Virginie Pichet	1–6, 3–6
Loss	3.	20 February 2011	ITF Antalya, Turkey	Clay	(Germany) Christina Shakovets	4–6, 1–6
Win	2.	12 August 2012	ITF Pirot, Serbia	Clay	(North Macedonia) Lina Gjorcheska	6–3, 6–1
Win	3.	7 April 2013	ITF Heraklion, Greece	Carpet	(Bulgaria) Aleksandra Karamanoleva	6–0, 6–1

=== Doubles: 49 (33–16) ===
Result	No.	Date	Tournament	Surface	Partner	Opponents	Score
Loss	1.	15 September 2006	ITF Torre del Greco, Italy	Clay	(Italy) Emilia Desiderio	(Italy) Andreea Vaideanu (Italy) Erika Zanchetta	1–6, 6–1, 1–6
Win	1.	23 September 2006	ITF Lecce, Italy	Clay	(Russia) Ekaterina Lopes	(France) Kildine Chevalier (Italy) Adriana Serra Zanetti	7–6^{(4)}, 6–4
Win	2.	22 October 2006	ITF Dubrovnik, Croatia	Clay	(Serbia) Ana Veselinović	(Serbia) Ana Jovanović (Slovenia) Polona Reberšak	6–4, 7–5
Win	3.	29 October 2006	ITF Dubrovnik, Croatia	Clay	(Austria) Stefanie Haidner	(Slovenia) Aleksandra Lukič (Slovenia) Patricia Vollmeier	6–4, 6–3
Loss	2.	1 April 2007	ITF Hammond, United States	Hard	(Canada) Marie-Ève Pelletier	(Chinese Taipei) Chan Chin-wei (United States) Tetiana Luzhanska	1–6, 6–7^{(3)}
Loss	3.	9 June 2007	Zagreb Ladies Open, Croatia	Clay	(Montenegro) Danica Krstajić	(Serbia) Ana Jovanović (Russia) Anastasia Poltoratskaya	6–0, 4–6, 1–6
Win	4.	23 June 2007	ITF Fontanafredda, Italy	Clay	(Bosnia and Herzegovina) Mervana Jugić-Salkić	(Germany) Carmen Klaschka (Romania) Magda Mihalache	6–2, 6–1
Win	5.	29 June 2007	ITF Sarajevo, Bosnia and Herzegovina	Clay	(Serbia) Karolina Jovanović	(Slovakia) Katarína Poljaková (Slovakia) Zuzana Zlochová	6–1, 6–0
Win	6.	5 July 2007	ITF Båstad, Sweden	Clay	(Sweden) Hanna Nooni	(Bosnia and Herzegovina) Mervana Jugić-Salkić (Greece) Anna Koumantou	7–5, 7–5
Win	7.	27 October 2007	ITF Saint-Denis, France	Hard	(Mauritius) Marinne Giraud	(France) Florence Haring (France) Virginie Pichet	6–2, 7–5
Win	8.	2 December 2007	ITF Sintra, Portugal	Clay (i)	(Belgium) Caroline Maes	(Portugal) Neuza Silva (Brazil) Roxane Vaisemberg	6–4, 6–1
Win	9.	21 March 2008	ITF Noida, India	Hard	(Slovakia) Lenka Tvarošková	(South Africa) Kelly Anderson (South Africa) Chanelle Scheepers	6–2, 6–7^{(7)}, [10–6]
Loss	4.	14 May 2008	ITF Szczecin, Poland	Clay	(Finland) Emma Laine	(Czech Republic) Iveta Gerlová (Czech Republic) Tereza Hladíková	1–6, 4–6
Win	10.	24 May 2008	ITF Moscow, Russia	Clay	(Finland) Emma Laine	(Russia) Maria Kondratieva (Ukraine) Oksana Teplyakova	7–6^{(5)}, 6–2
Win	11.	21 June 2008	ITF Istanbul, Turkey	Hard	(Slovakia) Lenka Tvarošková	(Switzerland) Stefania Boffa (Czech Republic) Nikola Fraňková	7–5, 7–6^{(4)}
Win	12.	27 July 2008	ITF Les Contamines, France	Hard	(Bosnia and Herzegovina) Mervana Jugić-Salkić	(Germany) Justine Ozga (Czech Republic) Darina Šeděnková	6–1, 6–4
Loss	5.	15 August 2008	Palić Open, Serbia	Clay	(Bosnia and Herzegovina) Mervana Jugić-Salkić	(Poland) Olga Brózda (Poland) Magdalena Kiszczyńska	3–6, 5–7^{(6)}
Win	13.	30 August 2008	ITF Vlaardingen, Netherlands	Clay	(Bosnia and Herzegovina) Mervana Jugić-Salkić	(Latvia) Irina Kuzmina (Russia) Anastasia Poltoratskaya	6–1, 6–2
Win	14.	22 November 2008	ITF Phoenix, Mauritius	Hard	(Slovakia) Lenka Tvarošková	(South Africa) Kelly Anderson (South Africa) Natalie Grandin	6–4, 3–6, [10–4]
Win	15.	12 April 2009	ITF Šibenik, Croatia	Clay	(Serbia) Nataša Zorić	(Slovenia) Tina Obrez (Slovenia) Mika Urbančič	6–0, 6–3
Win	16.	17 July 2009	ITF Rome, Italy	Clay	(Argentina) María Irigoyen	(Italy) Elisa Balsamo (Italy) Stefania Chieppa	7–5, 6–2
Win	17.	5 September 2009	ITF Brčko, Bosnia and Herzegovina	Clay	(Serbia) Karolina Jovanović	(Romania) Patricia Chirea (Slovenia) Petra Pajalič	6–4, 6–1
Loss	6.	13 September 2009	Open Porte du Hainaut, France	Clay	(Poland) Magdalena Kiszczyńska	(Russia) Elena Chalova (Russia) Ksenia Lykina	4–6, 3–6
Loss	7.	10 October 2009	Royal Cup, Montenegro	Clay	(Serbia) Karolina Jovanović	(Italy) Nicole Clerico (Poland) Karolina Kosińska	7–6^{(4)}, 4–6, [4–10]
Loss	8.	25 April 2010	Hardee's Pro Classic, U.S.	Clay	(Argentina) María Irigoyen	(Russia) Alina Jidkova (Belarus) Anastasia Yakimova	4–6, 2–6
Win	18.	12 June 2010	ITF Budapest, Hungary	Clay	(Slovakia) Lenka Wienerová	(Germany) Anna Livadaru (Argentina) Florencia Molinero	6–4, 6–1
Win	19.	2 July 2010	Bella Cup Toruń, Poland	Clay	(Australia) Marija Mirkovic	(Poland) Katarzyna Piter (Poland) Barbara Sobaszkiewicz	4–6, 6–2, [10–5]
Win	20.	10 July 2010	ITF Aschaffenburg, Germany	Clay	(Japan) Erika Sema	(Romania) Elena Bogdan (Chile) Andrea Koch Benvenuto	7–6^{(4)}, 2–6, [10–8]
Loss	9.	6 August 2010	ITF Moscow, Russia	Clay	(Australia) Marija Mirkovic	(Russia) Nadejda Guskova (Russia) Valeria Solovyeva	6–7^{(5)}, 3–6
Loss	10.	15 January 2011	GB Pro-Series Glasgow, UK	Hard (i)	(Bosnia and Herzegovina) Jasmina Tinjić	(Norway) Ulrikke Eikeri (Bulgaria) Isabella Shinikova	4–6, 4–6
Win	21.	12 February 2011	ITF Antalya, Turkey	Clay	(Russia) Marina Shamayko	(Turkey) Sultan Gönen (Ukraine) Anna Karavayeva	6–4, 6–4
Loss	11.	29 April 2011	ITF Minsk, Belarus	Hard (i)	(Austria) Nicole Rottmann	(Ukraine) Lyudmyla Kichenok (Ukraine) Nadiya Kichenok	1–6, 2–6
Win	22.	18 June 2011	ITF Istanbul, Turkey	Hard	(Poland) Marta Domachowska	(Australia) Daniella Dominikovic (Turkey) Melis Sezer	6–4, 6–2
Win	23.	10 September 2011	Saransk Cup, Russia	Clay	(Romania) Mihaela Buzărnescu	(Czech Republic) Eva Hrdinová (Ukraine) Veronika Kapshay	6–3, 6–1
Loss	12.	19 March 2012	ITF Antalya, Turkey	Clay	(Italy) Claudia Giovine	(Italy) Evelyn Mayr (Italy) Julia Mayr	2–6, 3–6
Win	24.	23 April 2012	ITF San Severo, Italy	Clay	(Italy) Anastasia Grymalska	(Italy) Chiara Mendo (Italy) Giulia Sussarello	6–2, 6–4
Win	25.	26 May 2012	ITF Timișoara, Romania	Clay	(Romania) Andreea Mitu	(North Macedonia) Lina Gjorcheska (Bulgaria) Dalia Zafirova	6–1, 6–2
Loss	13.	4 June 2012	ITF Qarshi, Uzbekistan	Clay	(Ukraine) Veronika Kapshay	(Ukraine) Valentyna Ivakhnenko (Ukraine) Kateryna Kozlova	5–7, 3–6
Win	26.	25 June 2012	ITF Izmir, Turkey	Hard	(Romania) Ana Bogdan	(Australia) Abbie Myers (Turkey) Melis Sezer	6–3, 3–0 ret.
Loss	14.	25 June 2012	Save Cup Mestre, Italy	Clay	(Hungary) Réka Luca Jani	(Argentina) Mailen Auroux (Argentina) Maria Irigoyen	7–5, 4–6, [8–10]
Loss	15.	4 February 2013	ITF Antalya, Turkey	Clay	(Romania) Ana Bogdan	(Italy) Giulia Bruzzone (Italy) Martina Caregaro	3–6, 6–1, [6–10]
Win	27.	11 February 2013	ITF Antalya, Turkey	Clay	(Romania) Raluca Elena Platon	(Georgia (country)) Ekaterine Gorgodze (Georgia (country)) Sofia Kvatsabaia	1–6, 4–5 ret.
Win	28.	1 April 2013	ITF Heraklion, Greece	Carpet	(Slovakia) Vivien Juhászová	(Italy) Giulia Sussarello (Italy) Sara Sussarello	7–5, 6–7^{(7)}, [10–4]
Win	29.	8 Apr 2013	ITF Heraklion, Greece	Carpet	(Russia) Marina Melnikova	(Italy) Giulia Sussarello (Greece) Despina Papamichail	6–1, 6–4
Win	30.	13 May 2013	ITF Balikpapan, Indonesia	Hard	(United Kingdom) Naomi Broady	(Chinese Taipei) Chen Yi (China) Xu Yifan	6–3, 6–3
Win	31.	20 May 2013	ITF Tarakan, Indonesia	Hard (i)	(United Kingdom) Naomi Broady	(China) Tang Haochen (China) Tian Ran	6–2, 1–6, [10–5]
Loss	16.	3 June 2013	ITF Qarshi, Uzbekistan	Clay	(Ukraine) Veronika Kapshay	(Russia) Margarita Gasparyan (Belarus) Polina Pekhova	2–6, 1–6
Win	32.	16 September 2013	ITF Dobrich, Bulgaria	Clay	(Switzerland) Xenia Knoll	(Bulgaria) Isabella Shinikova (Bulgaria) Dalia Zafirova	7–5, 7–6^{(5)}
Win	33.	20 January 2014	ITF Daytona Beach, U.S.	Clay	(United States) Nicole Melichar	(United States) Asia Muhammad (United States) Allie Will	6–7^{(5)}, 7–6^{(1)}, [10–1]

== Fed Cup participation ==
=== Singles (0–1) ===
Edition	Round	Date	Against	Surface	Opponent	Result	Score
2008 Fed Cup World Group II	Quarterfinals	26 April 2008	Croatia	Hard	Ana Vrljić	Loss	4–6, 5–7

=== Doubles (0–2) ===
Edition	Round	Date	Against	Surface	Partner	Opponents	Result	Score
2008 Fed Cup Europe/ Africa Group I D	Round Robin	31 January 2008	Poland	Carpet	Ana Jovanović	Klaudia Jans; Alicja Rosolska	Loss	3–6, 2–6
2008 Fed Cup World Group II	Quarterfinals	27 April 2008	Croatia	Hard	Ana Jovanović	Jelena Kostanić Tošić; Ana Vrljić	Loss	1–4 ret.
