= Federica Di Sarra =

Italian tennis player (born 1990)

Federica di Sarra
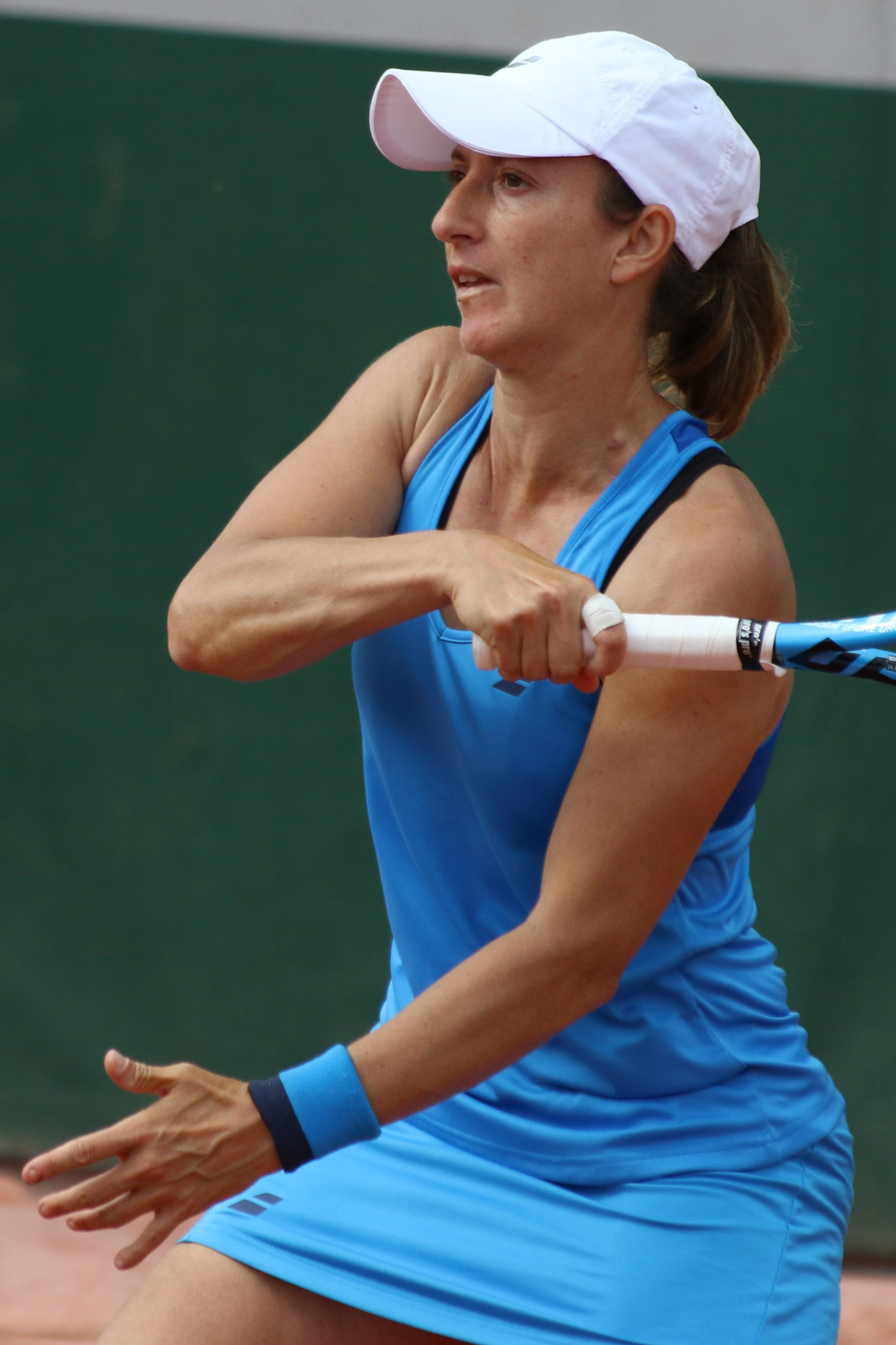
- Di Sarra at the 2022 French Open
- Country (sports): Italy
- Born: 16 May 1990 (age 36)
- Turned pro: 2004
- Plays: Right (two-handed backhand)
- Prize money: $289,869

Singles
- Career record: 426–312
- Career titles: 8 ITF
- Highest ranking: No. 192 (7 March 2022)
- Current ranking: No. 934 (15 June 2026)

Grand Slam singles results
- Australian Open: Q1 (2022)
- French Open: Q1 (2022)
- Wimbledon: Q1 (2022)
- US Open: Q3 (2021)

Doubles
- Career record: 155–86
- Career titles: 22 ITF
- Highest ranking: No. 186 (20 May 2019)
Medal record
Representing Italy
Mediterranean Games
| Silver medal – second place | 2013 Mersin | Doubles |
| Bronze medal – third place | 2013 Mersin | Singles |
- Last updated on: 20 June 2026.

Federica di Sarra (born 16 May 1990) is an Italian inactive tennis player.

She has a career-high singles ranking of world No. 192, which she achieved on 7 March 2022. Her highest WTA doubles ranking is 186, reached on 20 May 2019. She has won eight singles and 22 doubles titles on the ITF Women's Circuit.

Di Sarra won a silver medal for Italy at the 2013 Mediterranean Games in Mersin, Turkey in the doubles event, with her teammate Anastasia Grymalska. She also won the bronze medal in the singles competition.

She made her WTA Tour main-draw debut as a qualifier at the 2021 Poland Open.

== Grand Slam performance timeline ==
Key
| W | F | SF | QF | #R | RR | Q# | DNQ | A | NH |

(W) winner; (F) finalist; (SF) semifinalist; (QF) quarterfinalist; (#R) rounds 4, 3, 2, 1; (RR) round-robin stage; (Q#) qualification round; (DNQ) did not qualify; (A) absent; (NH) not held; (SR) strike rate (events won / competed); (W–L) win–loss record.
To avoid confusion and double counting, these charts are updated at the conclusion of a tournament or when the player's participation has ended.

=== Singles ===
| Tournament | 2021 | 2022 | SR | W–L |
|---|---|---|---|---|
| Australian Open | A | Q1 | 0 / 0 | 0–0 |
| French Open | A | Q1 | 0 / 0 | 0–0 |
| Wimbledon | A | Q1 | 0 / 0 | 0–0 |
| US Open | Q3 | A | 0 / 0 | 0–0 |
| Win–loss | 0–0 | 0–0 | 0 / 0 | 0–0 |

== ITF Circuit finals ==
=== Singles: 20 (8 titles, 12 runner-ups) ===
| Legend $60,000 tournaments $25,000 tournaments $10/15,000 tournaments | Finals by surface Hard (2–1) Clay (5–10) Carpet (1–1) |

| Result | W–L | Date | Tournament | Tier | Surface | Opponent | Score |
|---|---|---|---|---|---|---|---|
| Loss | 0–1 | Mar 2007 | ITF Quatu Sant'Elena, Italy | 10,000 | Hard | (Italy) Anna Floris | 1–6, 4–6 |
| Loss | 0–2 | Aug 2007 | ITF Gardone Val Trombia, Italy | 10,000 | Clay | (Italy) Verdiana Verardi | 6–4, 4–6, 3–6 |
| Loss | 0–3 | Aug 2007 | ITF Jesi, Italy | 10,000 | Carpet | (Italy) Anna-Giulia Remondina | 6–4, 1–6, 6–7^{(5)} |
| Loss | 0–4 | Jun 2008 | ITF Bucharest, Romania | 10,000 | Clay | (Romania) Mihaela Buzărnescu | 2–6, 2–6 |
| Loss | 0–5 | May 2009 | ITF Florence, Italy | 25,000 | Clay | (Belarus) Darya Kustova | 2–6, 1–6 |
| Win | 1–5 | Aug 2010 | Internazionali di Todi, Italy | 10,000 | Clay | (Austria) Lisa Maria Reichmann | 6–1, 6–3 |
| Win | 2–5 | Sep 2010 | ITF Casale Monferrato, Italy | 10,000 | Clay | (Italy) Erika Zanchetta | 6–3, 6–4 |
| Loss | 2–6 | Oct 2011 | ITF Settimo San Pietro, Italy | 10,000 | Clay | (Germany) Anne Schäfer | 6–3, 3–6, 6–7^{(3)} |
| Win | 3–6 | Jun 2012 | ITF Campobasso, Italy | 10,000 | Clay | (Armenia) Ani Amiraghyan | 7–5, 6–2 |
| Win | 4–6 | Jul 2012 | ITF Imola, Italy | 25,000 | Carpet | (Italy) Julia Mayr | 6–4, 6–2 |
| Loss | 4–7 | Jul 2013 | ITF Torino, Italy | 10,000 | Clay | (Italy) Claudia Giovine | 6–4, 6–7^{(6)}, 2–6 |
| Loss | 4–8 | Aug 2017 | ITF Cuneo, Italy | 15,000 | Clay | (Italy) Martina Colmegna | 7–6^{(2)}, 3–6, 3–6 |
| Loss | 4–9 | Sep 2017 | ITF Trieste, Italy | 15,000 | Clay | (Italy) Martina Caregaro | 6–2, 1–6, 2–6 |
| Win | 5–9 | Nov 2017 | ITF Ortisei, Italy | 15,000 | Hard | (Russia) Alina Silich | 6–1, 6–3 |
| Loss | 5–10 | Mar 2018 | ITF Pula, Italy | 25,000 | Clay | (Serbia) Olga Danilović | 4–6, 3–6 |
| Loss | 5–11 | Sep 2019 | ITF Brno, Czech Republic | W25 | Clay | (Luxembourg) Eléonora Molinaro | 4–6, 3–6 |
| Win | 6–11 | Sep 2020 | ITF Trieste, Italy | W15 | Clay | (Italy) Camilla Rosatello | 6–0, 6–1 |
| Win | 7–11 | Sep 2020 | ITF Tarvisio, Italy | W25 | Clay | (Belgium) Maryna Zanevska | 3–6, 6–3, 6–4 |
| Win | 8–11 | Nov 2020 | ITF Ortisei, Italy | W15 | Hard | (Liechtenstein) Kathinka von Deichmann | 6–3, 6–3 |
| Loss | 8–12 | Aug 2021 | Reinert Open, Germany | W60 | Clay | (Russia) Elina Avanesyan | 7–6^{(4)}, 2–6, 2–6 |

=== Doubles: 35 (22 titles, 13 runner-ups) ===
| Legend $60,000 tournaments $25,000 tournaments $10/15,000 tournaments | Finals by surface Hard (0–3) Clay (20–10) Carpet (2–0) |

| Result | W–L | Date | Tournament | Tier | Surface | Partner | Opponents | Score |
|---|---|---|---|---|---|---|---|---|
| Loss | 0–1 | Aug 2009 | ITF Pesaro, Italy | 10,000 | Clay | (Italy) Alice Balducci | (Italy) Anastasia Grymalska (Italy) Martina Trevisan | 2–6, 2–6 |
| Loss | 0–2 | Nov 2009 | ITF Mallorca, Spain | 10,000 | Clay | (Italy) Martina di Giuseppe | (Ukraine) Kateryna Herth (Ukraine) Anastasiya Lytovchenko | 3–6, 6–7^{(5)} |
| Win | 1–2 | Aug 2010 | ITF Locri, Italy | 10,000 | Clay | (Italy) Valentina Sulpizio | (Italy) Federica Grazioso (Italy) Alice Savoretti | 6–4, 6–2 |
| Win | 2–2 | Sep 2010 | ITF Casale Monferrato, Italy | 10,000 | Clay | (Italy) Giulia Gabba | (Italy) Federica Grazioso (Italy) Vivienne Vierin | 6–2, 6–2 |
| Win | 3–2 | Aug 2011 | Internazionali di Todi, Italy | 10,000 | Clay | (Italy) Angelica Moratelli | (Australia) Stephanie Bengson (United States) Kirsten Flower | 7–6^{(6)}, 7–5 |
| Loss | 3–3 | Oct 2011 | ITF Settimo San Pietro, Italy | 10,000 | Clay | (Italy) Alice Savoretti | (Italy) Alice Moroni (Italy) Giulia Sussarello | 5–7, 4–6 |
| Win | 4–3 | Jun 2012 | ITF Campobasso, Italy | 10,000 | Clay | (Italy) Giulia Pairone | (Italy) Giulia Gasparri (Italy) Giulia Sussarello | 6–2, 6–1 |
| Win | 5–3 | Jul 2012 | ITF Imola, Italy | 25,000 | Carpet | (Italy) Alice Balducci | (Slovenia) Tadeja Majerič (Russia) Marina Melnikova | w/o |
| Win | 6–3 | Aug 2012 | ITF Monteroni d'Arbia, Italy | 25,000 | Clay | (Italy) Anastasia Grymalska | (Italy) Alice Balducci (Italy) Karin Knapp | 6–4, 5–7, [10–7] |
| Win | 7–3 | Sep 2012 | ITF Bagnatica, Italy | 10,000 | Clay | (Italy) Anastasia Grymalska | (Argentina) Tatiana Búa (Italy) Claudia Giovine | 7–5, 6–2 |
| Win | 8–3 | Aug 2013 | ITF Locri, Italy | 10,000 | Clay | (Greece) Despina Papamichail | (Italy) Alice Matteucci (Italy) Camilla Rosatello | 6–3, 3–6, [10–4] |
| Loss | 8–4 | Feb 2014 | ITF Macon, France | 10,000 | Hard (i) | (Italy) Camilla Rosatello | (France) Audrey Albié (France) Kinnie Laisné | 3–6, 6–2, [8–10] |
| Loss | 8–5 | Jul 2014 | Internazionali di Todi, Italy | 10,000 | Clay | (Italy) Alice Savoretti | (Italy) Deborah Chiesa (Italy) Beatrice Lombardo | 3–6, 6–3, [8–10] |
| Win | 9–5 | Jul 2017 | ITF Tarvisio, Italy | 15,000 | Clay | (Switzerland) Lisa Sabino | (Argentina) Carla Lucero (Hungary) Szabina Szlavikovics | 6–0, 6–3 |
| Win | 10–5 | Jul 2017 | ITF Schio, Italy | 15,000 | Clay | (Switzerland) Lisa Sabino | (Italy) Anastasia Grymalska (Italy) Maria Masini | 6–0, 6–1 |
| Win | 11–5 | Aug 2017 | ITF Cuneo, Italy | 15,000 | Clay | (Italy) Anastasia Grymalska | (Argentina) Melina Ferrero (Argentina) Sofía Luini | 6–0, 6–1 |
| Win | 12–5 | Aug 2017 | ITF Sezze, Italy | 15,000 | Clay | (Italy) Giorgia Marchetti | (Russia) Maria Marfutina (Italy) Dalila Spiteri | 3–6, 6–3, [11–9] |
| Win | 13–5 | Dec 2017 | ITF Cordenons, Italy | 15,000 | Clay | (Italy) Michele Zmau | (Italy) Lucia Bronzetti (Russia) Liudmila Samsonova | 6–2, 1–6, [10–8] |
| Loss | 13–6 | Feb 2018 | ITF Antalya, Turkey | 15,000 | Hard | (Italy) Martina Caregaro | (Georgia (country)) Ekaterine Gorgodze (Bosnia and Herzegovina) Dea Herdželaš | 2–6, 4–6 |
| Loss | 13–7 | Jun 2018 | Verbier Open, Switzerland | 15,000 | Clay | (Italy) Martina Caregaro | (Czech Republic) Gabriela Horacková (Switzerland) Nina Stadler | 6–7^{(5)}, 7–6^{(3)}, [7–10] |
| Loss | 13–8 | Jul 2018 | ITF Torino, Italy | 25,000 | Clay | (Italy) Martina Caregaro | (Germany) Vivian Heisen (Egypt) Sandra Samir | 3–6, 2–6 |
| Win | 14–8 | Jul 2018 | ITF Imola, Italy | 25,000 | Carpet | (Italy) Giorgia Marchetti | (Italy) Claudia Giovine (Slovenia) Manca Pislak | 6–3, 6–1 |
| Win | 15–8 | Sep 2018 | ITF Pula, Italy | 25,000 | Clay | (Italy) Martina Colmegna | (United Kingdom) Emily Arbuthnott (Germany) Katharina Hobgarski | 7–6^{(0)}, 6–2 |
| Win | 16–8 | Sep 2018 | ITF Pula, Italy | 25,000 | Clay | (Italy) Anastasia Grymalska | (Italy) Deborah Chiesa (Italy) Tatiana Pieri | 7–6^{(3)}, 6–2 |
| Win | 17–8 | Oct 2018 | ITF Pula, Italy | 25,000 | Clay | (Italy) Martina Colmegna | (Croatia) Lea Bošković (Romania) Cristina Dinu | 6–4, 7–6^{(1)} |
| Loss | 17–9 | Nov 2018 | ITF Pula, Italy | 25,000 | Clay | (Italy) Anastasia Grymalska | (Romania) Cristina Dinu (Romania) Andreea Mitu | w/o |
| Win | 18–9 | Apr 2019 | ITF Pula, Italy | W25 | Clay | (Italy) Anastasia Grymalska | (Italy) Giorgia Marchetti (Italy) Camilla Rosatello | 6–4, 6–1 |
| Loss | 18–10 | Sep 2019 | ITF Bagnatica, Italy | W25+H | Clay | (Italy) Martina Caregaro | (Brazil) Carolina Alves (Brazil) Gabriela Cé | 2–6, 6–1, [5–10] |
| Win | 19–10 | Aug 2020 | ITF Cordenons, Italy | W15 | Clay | (Italy) Martina Colmegna | (Italy) Angelica Moratelli (Slovenia) Nika Radišić | 6–2, 7–6^{(7)} |
| Loss | 19–11 | Sep 2020 | Grado Tennis Cup, Italy | W25 | Clay | (Italy) Camilla Rosatello | (Hungary) Anna Bondár (Hungary) Fanny Stollár | 5–7, 2–6 |
| Loss | 19–12 | Nov 2020 | ITF Ortisei, Italy | W15 | Hard (i) | (Finland) Anastasia Kulikova | (Netherlands) Suzan Lamens (Belgium) Kimberley Zimmermann | 6–3, 4–6, [9–11] |
| Win | 20–12 | Feb 2021 | ITF Poitiers, France | W25 | Hard (i) | (Italy) Camilla Rosatello | (France) Estelle Cascino (Australia) Seone Mendez | 6–4, 6–3 |
| Win | 21–12 | May 2021 | Krka Open, Slovenia | W25 | Clay | (Italy) Camilla Rosatello | (Croatia) Lea Bošković (Cyprus) Raluca Șerban | 6–4, 6–7^{(4)}, [10–4] |
| Loss | 21–13 | Jun 2021 | Grado Tennis Cup, Italy | W25 | Clay | (Italy) Camilla Rosatello | (Bulgaria) Isabella Shinikova (Italy) Lucia Bronzetti | 4–6, 6–2, [8–10] |
| Win | 22–13 | Jul 2021 | ITF Turin, Italy | W25 | Clay | (Italy) Camilla Rosatello | (Italy) Lucia Bronzetti (Italy) Aurora Zantedeschi | 6–2, 6–2 |
