= Gioia Barbieri =

Italian former tennis player

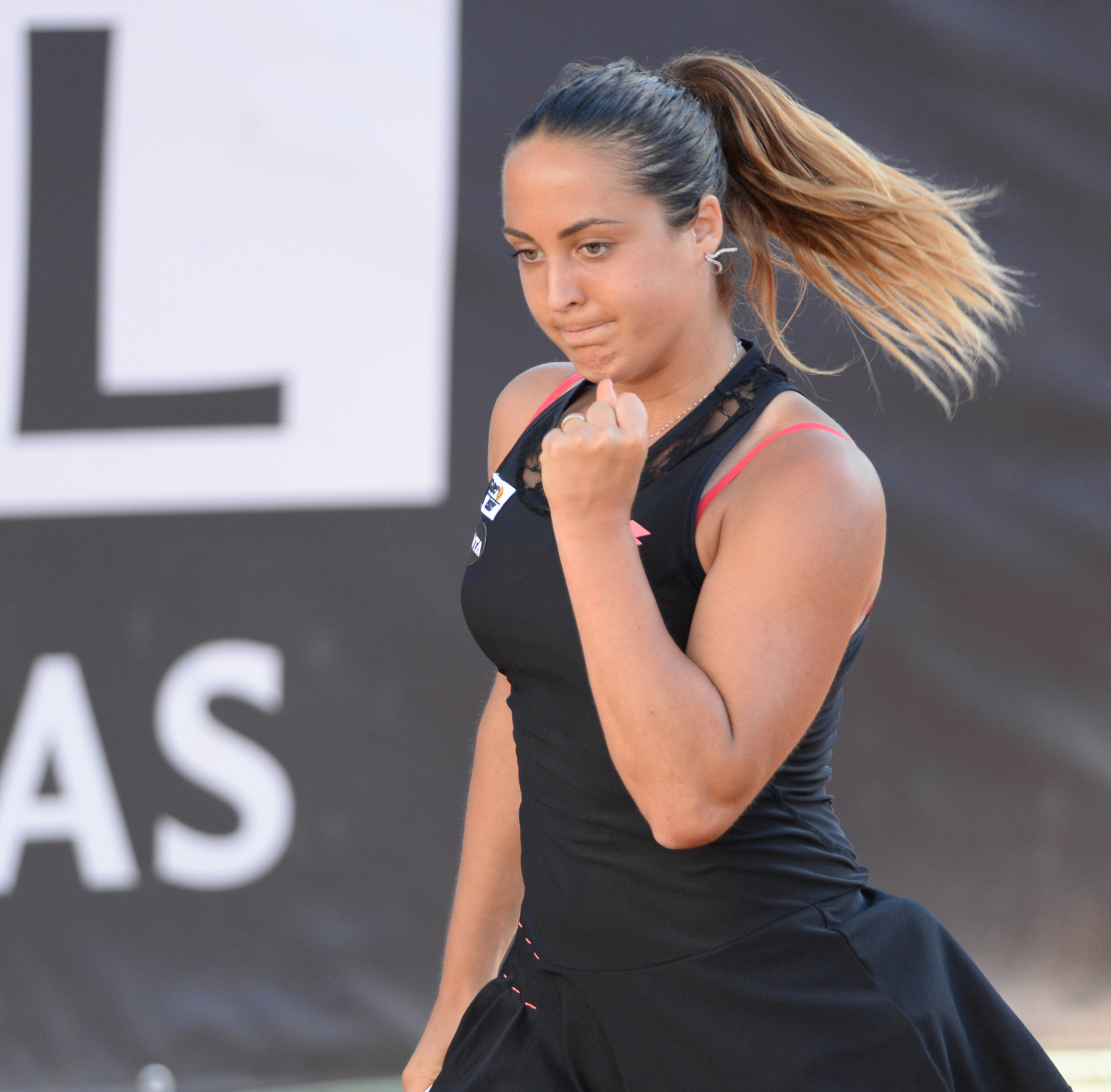
- Barbieri, 2015
- Country (sports): Italy
- Residence: Cervia
- Born: 9 July 1991 (age 33); Forlimpopoli
- Height: 1.70 m (5 ft 7 in)
- Turned pro: 2009
- Retired: 2016
- Plays: Right (two-handed backhand)
- Prize money: $136,192

Singles
- Career record: 262–179
- Career titles: 8 ITF
- Highest ranking: No. 170 (15 September 2014)

Grand Slam singles results
- Australian Open: Q1 (2015)
- US Open: Q2 (2014)

Doubles
- Career record: 116–80
- Career titles: 15 ITF
- Highest ranking: No. 165 (13 April 2015)

Gioia Barbieri (Italian pronunciation: [ˈdʒɔːja barˈbjɛːri, -ˈbjeː-]; born 9 July 1991) is an Italian former tennis player.

== Tennis career ==
Barbieri was born in Forlimpopoli, Italy. She trained at the San Marino Tennis Academy, and was coached by Claudio Pistolesi. Her father is Andrea, her mother is Marcella and she has one sister, Maria Sole.

In her career, Barbieri won eight singles titles and 15 doubles titles on the ITF Women's Circuit. On September 15, 2014, she reached her career-high WTA singles ranking of 170, whilst her best doubles ranking is 165, which she achieved on April 13, 2015, having reached the final of the 2015 Katowice Open.

In June 2016, Barbieri announced via social media her retirement from tennis to start working on the family estate.

== WTA Tour finals ==
=== Doubles: 1 (runner-up) ===
Legend
Grand Slam tournaments
Premier M & Premier 5
Premier
International (0–1)

Result	Date	Championship	Surface	Partner	Opponents	Score
Loss	12 April 2015	Katowice Open, Poland	Hard (i)	(Italy) Karin Knapp	(Belgium) Ysaline Bonaventure (Netherlands) Demi Schuurs	5–7, 6–4, [6–10]

== ITF finals ==
$25,000 tournaments
$10,000 tournaments

=== Singles: 10 (8–2) ===
Result	No.	Date	Tournament	Surface	Opponent	Score
Win	1.	18 July 2010	ITF Imola, Italy	Carpet	(Italy) Verdiana Verardi	6–1, 6–1
Win	2.	14 February 2011	ITF Leimen, Germany	Hard (i)	(Germany) Korina Perkovic	6–4, 6–2
Loss	1.	27 February 2012	ITF Antalya, Turkey	Clay	(Croatia) Ana Savić	3–6, 4–6
Win	3.	23 July 2012	ITF Viserba, Italy	Clay	(Colombia) Yuliana Lizarazo	6–4, 6–4
Win	4.	19 August 2013	ITF Pörtschach, Austria	Clay	(Slovenia) Nastja Kolar	6–2, 6–3
Win	5.	1 September 2013	ITF Bagnatica, Italy	Clay	(Germany) Anne Schäfer	6–3, 3–6, 6–1
Win	6.	27 October 2013	Lagos Open, Nigeria	Hard	(Russia) Nina Bratchikova	3–6, 6–3, 3–0 ret.
Win	7.	1 June 2014	Grado Tennis Cup, Italy	Clay	(Ukraine) Kateryna Kozlova	6–4, 4–6, 6–4
Win	8.	28 March 2015	ITF Solarino, Italy	Hard	(Italy) Federica Bilardo	7–6^{(5)}, 6–0
Loss	2.	13 March 2016	ITF Amiens, France	Clay (i)	(Germany) Laura Schaeder	6–1, 3–6, 3–6

=== Doubles: 19 (15–4) ===
Result	No.	Date	Tournament	Surface	Partner	Opponents	Score
Win	1.	11 October 2009	ITF Foggia, Italy	Clay	(Italy) Anastasia Grymalska	(Italy) Alice Moroni (Italy) Anna Remondina	6–4, 4–6, [10–2]
Win	2.	16 April 2010	ITF San Severo, Italy	Clay	(Italy) Anastasia Grymalska	(Russia) Karina Pimkina (Russia) Marina Shamayko	4–6, 6–2, [11–9]
Loss	1.	18 July 2010	ITF Imola, Italy	Carpet	(Argentina) María-Belén Corbalán	(Italy) Nicole Clerico (Italy) Maria Masini	4–6, 1–6
Win	3.	30 July 2010	ITF Gardone Val Trompia, Italy	Clay	(Italy) Anastasia Grymalska	(Bulgaria) Julia Stamatova (France) Stéphanie Vongsouthi	6–2, 6–2
Win	4.	27 March 2011	ITF Gonesse, France	Clay (i)	(Italy) Anastasia Grymalska	(Germany) Lena-Marie Hofmann (Germany) Scarlett Werner	6–3, 6–2
Loss	2.	1 August 2011	ITF Monteroni, Italy	Clay	(Italy) Anastasia Grymalska	(Netherlands) Kiki Bertens (Austria) Nicole Rottmann	0–6, 3–6
Win	5.	12 December 2011	ITF Antalya, Turkey	Clay	(Italy) Giulia Pasini	(Turkey) Başak Eraydın (Belarus) Ilona Kremen	7–6, 4–6, [10–5]
Loss	3.	15 January 2012	ITF Innisbrook, United States	Clay	(Russia) Nadejda Guskova	(Belarus) Darya Kustova (Romania) Raluca Olaru	3–6, 1–6
Win	6.	23 January 2012	ITF Antalya, Turkey	Clay	(Italy) Anastasia Grymalska	(Italy) Claudia Giovine (United States) Sanaz Marand	6–4, 1–6, [11–9]
Win	7.	7 May 2012	ITF Florence, Italy	Clay	(Romania) Andreea Văideanu	(France) Anaïs Laurendon (Italy) Nicole Clerico	6–2, 6–7, [10–8]
Win	8.	11 June 2012	ITF Padova, Italy	Clay	(Italy) Anastasia Grymalska	(Italy) Federica Grazioso (Switzerland) Lisa Sabino	6–2, 6–1
Win	9.	25 February 2013	ITF Antalya, Turkey	Clay	(Germany) Anne Schäfer	(Slovakia) Lenka Juríková (Slovakia) Chantal Škamlová	4–6, 6–3, [10–4]
Win	10.	4 March 2013	ITF Antalya, Turkey	Clay	(United States) Nicole Melichar	(Hungary) Ágnes Bukta (Slovakia) Vivian Juhászová	7–6^{(2)}, 6–4
Loss	4.	19 August 2013	ITF Pörtschach, Austria	Clay	(Italy) Giulia Sussarello	(Slovenia) Nastja Kolar (Slovenia) Polona Reberšak	0–6, 6–2, [10–4]
Win	11.	26 October 2013	Lagos Open, Nigeria	Hard	(Oman) Fatma Al-Nabhani	(Switzerland) Conny Perrin (South Africa) Chanel Simmonds	1–6, 6–4, [10–8]
Win	12.	17 March 2014	ITF Innisbrook, United States	Clay	(United States) Julia Cohen	(United States) Allie Kiick (United States) Sachia Vickery	7–6^{(5)}, 6–0
Win	13.	9 June 2014	ITF Padova, Italy	Clay	(Georgia (country)) Sofia Shapatava	(Brazil) Paula Cristina Gonçalves (Argentina) Florencia Molinero	6–4, 0–6, [14–12]
Win	14.	1 February 2015	Open Andrézieux-Bouthéon, France	Hard (i)	(Latvia) Jeļena Ostapenko	(Netherlands) Lesley Kerkhove (Croatia) Ana Vrljić	2–6, 7–6^{(4)}, [10–3]
Win	15.	13 March 2016	ITF Amiens, France	Clay (i)	(Italy) Giorgia Marchetti	(France) Alice Bacquié (Belgium) Kimberley Zimmermann	6–3, 6–4
