= Alice Matteucci =

Italian tennis player (born 1995)

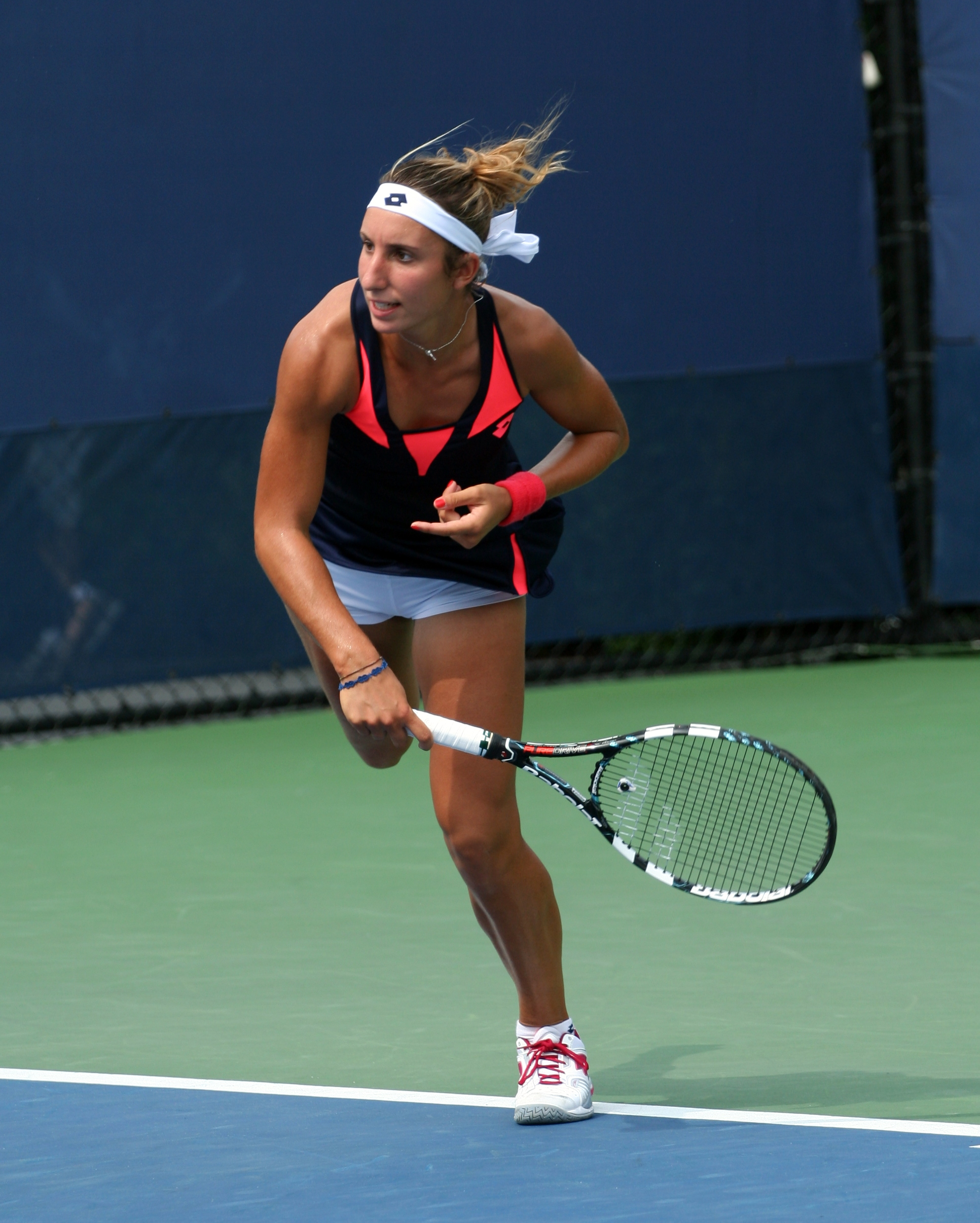
- Matteucci at the 2013 US Open
- Country (sports): Italy
- Born: 29 September 1995 (age 29); Pescara
- Prize money: $78,049

Singles
- Career record: 194–131
- Career titles: 6 ITF
- Highest ranking: No. 319 (22 February 2016)

Grand Slam singles results
- Australian Open Junior: Q2 (2012, 2013)
- French Open Junior: 1R (2013)
- Wimbledon Junior: 3R (2013)
- US Open Junior: 1R (2013)

Doubles
- Career record: 151–77
- Career titles: 16 ITF
- Highest ranking: No. 145 (26 October 2015)

Grand Slam doubles results
- Australian Open Junior: QF (2013)
- French Open Junior: SF (2013)
- Wimbledon Junior: 1R (2013)
- US Open Junior: QF (2013)

Team competitions
- Fed Cup: 0–1

Alice Matteucci (born 29 September 1995) is an Italian former tennis player.

She has won six singles and 16 doubles titles on the ITF Circuit. On 22 February 2016, she reached her best singles ranking of world No. 319. On 26 October 2015, she peaked at No. 145 in the doubles rankings.

Matteucci was given a wildcard for the Palermo Ladies Open, where she made her WTA Tour main-draw debut in July 2013, losing to Estrella Cabeza Candela in straight sets.

She made her debut for the Italy Fed Cup team in February 2014, in the World Group first-round tie away to the United States in Cleveland. Partnering Nastassja Burnett in doubles, she lost the dead rubber in straight sets to Lauren Davis and Madison Keys.

== ITF finals ==
=== Singles: 10 (6–4) ===
Legend $25,000 tournaments $15,000 tournaments $10,000 tournaments	Finals by surface Hard (1–1) Clay (4–3) Carpet (1–0)

Outcome	No.	Date	Tournament	Surface	Opponent	Score
Winner	1.	9 September 2013	ITF Pula, Italy	Clay	(Italy) Claudia Giovine	5–7, 6–2, 7–5
Winner	2.	3 March 2014	ITF Amiens, France	Clay (i)	(France) Manon Arcangioli	6–4, 6–3
Runner-up	1.	30 June 2014	ITF Brussels, Belgium	Clay	(Belgium) Klaartje Liebens	6–7^{(4–7)}, 6–4, 1–6
Runner-up	2.	7 July 2014	ITF Turin, Italy	Clay	(Colombia) Yuliana Lizarazo	6–7^{(5–7)}, 3–6
Winner	3.	23 March 2015	ITF Le Havre, France	Clay (i)	(Netherlands) Cindy Burger	4–6, 6–4, 7–6^{(7–3)}
Runner-up	3.	31 May 2015	ITF Sharm El Sheikh, Egypt	Hard	(Sweden) Jacqueline Cabaj Awad	6–4, 1–6, 3–6
Winner	4.	14 June 2015	ITF Sharm El Sheikh, Egypt	Hard	(Australia) Sara Tomic	6–4, 6–2
Runner-up	4.	5 July 2015	ITF Brussels, Belgium	Clay	(Belgium) Elyne Boeykens	4–6, 0–6
Winner	5.	26 November 2016	ITF Solarino, Italy	Carpet	(Belgium) Klaartje Liebens	6–3, 7–6^{(7–1)}
Winner	6.	9 September 2018	ITF Trieste, Italy	Clay	(Italy) Camilla Scala	6–2, 6–2

=== Doubles: 35 (16–19) ===
Legend $50,000 tournaments $25,000 tournaments $15,000 tournaments $10,000 tournaments	Finals by surface Hard (4–4) Clay (12–13) Grass (0–0) Carpet (0–2)

Outcome	No.	Date	Tier	Location	Surface	Partner	Opponents	Score
Runner-up	1.	15 October 2012	10,000	ITF Antalya, Turkey	Clay	(Poland) Barbara Sobaszkiewicz	(Ukraine) Alona Fomina (North Macedonia) Lina Gjorcheska	0–6, 4–6
Runner-up	2.	15 July 2013	25,000	ITF Imola, Italy	Carpet	(Philippines) Katharina Lehnert	(Ukraine) Lyudmyla Kichenok (Latvia) Jeļena Ostapenko	4–6, 6–3, [3–10]
Runner-up	3.	12 August 2013	10,000	ITF Locri, Italy	Clay	(Italy) Camilla Rosatello	(Greece) Despina Papamichail (Italy) Federica Di Sarra	3–6, 6–3, [4–10]
Winner	1.	23 September 2013	10,000	ITF Pula, Italy	Clay	(Italy) Claudia Giovine	(Germany) Carolin Daniels (Germany) Laura Schaeder	1–6, 6–3, [10–5]
Winner	2.	2 December 2013	10,000	ITF Duino-Aurisina, Italy	Clay (i)	(Italy) Claudia Giovine	(Italy) Anastasia Grymalska (Colombia) Yuliana Lizarazo	7–6^{(7–4)}, 6–1
Runner-up	4.	13 January 2014	10,000	ITF Tinajo, Spain	Hard	(Italy) Claudia Giovine	(Netherlands) Charlotte van der Meij (Netherlands) Kelly Versteeg	6–2, 6–7^{(5–7)}, [6–10]
Runner-up	5.	17 March 2014	10,000	ITF Pula, Italy	Clay	(Greece) Despina Papamichail	(Colombia) Yuliana Lizarazo (Australia) Alexandra Nancarrow	3–6, 6–4, [9–11]
Runner-up	6.	21 April 2014	25,000	Chiasso Open, Switzerland	Clay	(Italy) Camilla Rosatello	(Switzerland) Chiara Grimm (Switzerland) Jil Teichmann	5–7, 3–6
Winner	3.	12 May 2014	10,000	ITF Pula, Italy	Clay	(Colombia) Yuliana Lizarazo	(Argentina) Carla Lucero (Dominican Republic) Francesca Segarelli	6–1, 7–5
Winner	4.	30 June 2014	10,000	ITF Brussels, Belgium	Clay	(Italy) Camilla Rosatello	(Romania) Diana Buzean (Russia) Natela Dzalamidze	6–4, 3–6, [10–3]
Winner	5.	7 July 2014	10,000	ITF Turin, Italy	Clay	(Colombia) Yuliana Lizarazo	(Italy) Georgia Brescia (Switzerland) Lisa Sabino	6–3, 6–2
Runner-up	7.	11 August 2014	25,000	ITF Woking, United Kingdom	Hard	(Greece) Despina Papamichail	(Japan) Yumi Miyazaki (Japan) Mari Tanaka	2–6, 5–7
Winner	6.	27 October 2014	25,000	ITF Sharm El Sheikh, Egypt	Hard	(Belgium) Elise Mertens	(Romania) Ioana Loredana Roșca (Bulgaria) Julia Terziyska	6–7^{(1–7)}, 7–6^{(7–4)}, [10–6]
Runner-up	8.	23 February 2015	25,000	ITF Beinasco, Italy	Clay (i)	(Switzerland) Xenia Knoll	(Netherlands) Demi Schuurs (Chile) Daniela Seguel	4–6, 6–4, [9–11]
Runner-up	9.	23 March 2015	10,000	ITF Le Havre, France	Clay (i)	(Italy) Martina Trevisan	(Netherlands) Erika Vogelsang (Netherlands) Mandy Wagemaker	1–6, 6–1, [6–10]
Runner-up	10.	6 April 2015	25,000	Chiasso Open, Switzerland	Clay	(Italy) Giulia Gatto-Monticone	(Romania) Diana Buzean (Hungary) Réka Luca Jani	2–6, 5–7
Winner	7.	13 April 2015	10,000	ITF Pula, Italy	Clay	(Italy) Martina Trevisan	(Italy) Giorgia Marchetti (Italy) Anna Remondina	6–2, 6–3
Runner-up	11.	27 April 2015	25,000	ITF Pula, Italy	Clay	(Romania) Diana Buzean	(Slovenia) Nastja Kolar (Greece) Despina Papamichail	1–6, 6–1, [8–10]
Runner-up	12.	18 May 2015	25,000	ITF Caserta, Italy	Clay	(Turkey) İpek Soylu	(Georgia (country)) Ekaterine Gorgodze (Georgia (country)) Sofia Shapatava	0–6, 6–7^{(6–8)}
Winner	8.	30 May 2015	10,000	ITF Sharm El Sheikh, Egypt	Hard	(Greece) Despina Papamichail	(Romania) Elena-Teodora Cadar (Greece) Eleni Kordolaimi	6–3, 6–4
Winner	9.	6 June 2015	10,000	ITF Sharm El Sheikh, Egypt	Hard	(Greece) Despina Papamichail	(United Kingdom) Grace Dixon (Finland) Ella Leivo	6–1, 6–3
Winner	10.	10 July 2015	25,000	ITF Turin, Italy	Clay	(Switzerland) Xenia Knoll	(Sweden) Susanne Celik (Latvia) Diāna Marcinkēviča	6–2, 7–5
Runner-up	13.	23 October 2015	50,000	Open de Touraine, France	Hard (i)	(Switzerland) Viktorija Golubic	(Romania) Alexandra Cadanțu (Romania) Cristina Dinu	5–7, 3–6
Winner	11.	20 November 2015	25,000	GB Pro-Series Shrewsbury, UK	Hard (i)	(Switzerland) Xenia Knoll	(Netherlands) Lesley Kerkhove (Netherlands) Quirine Lemoine	3–6, 6–3, [10–3]
Runner-up	14.	27 May 2016	25,000	ITF Grado, Italy	Clay	(Turkey) Başak Eraydın	(Argentina) Catalina Pella (Chile) Daniela Seguel	2–6, 6–7^{(8–10)}
Winner	12.	10 June 2016	25,000	ITF Padua, Italy	Clay	(Poland) Katarzyna Piter	(Romania) Cristina Dinu (North Macedonia) Lina Gjorcheska	2–6, 7–6^{(7–1)}, [10–8]
Runner-up	15.	4 July 2016	25,000	ITF Turin, Italy	Clay	(Georgia (country)) Sofia Shapatava	(North Macedonia) Lina Gjorcheska (Slovenia) Dalila Jakupović	3–6, 3–6
Winner	13.	26 August 2016	25,000	ITF Bagnatica, Italy	Clay	(Italy) Camilla Rosatello	(Switzerland) Conny Perrin (Russia) Yana Sizikova	6–4, 5–7, [10–5]
Runner-up	16.	2 September 2016	25,000	ITF Barcelona, Spain	Clay	(Switzerland) Jil Teichmann	(Venezuela) Andrea Gámiz (Spain) Georgina García Pérez	2–6, 5–7
Runner-up	17.	3 March 2017	15,000	ITF Mâcon, France	Hard (i)	(Italy) Camilla Rosatello	(Belarus) Ilona Kremen (Latvia) Diāna Marcinkēviča	7–6^{(7–5)}, 6–7^{(1–7)}, [4–10]
Winner	14.	9 April 2017	25,000	ITF Pula, Italy	Clay	(Italy) Camilla Rosatello	(Netherlands) Bibiane Schoofs (Poland) Sandra Zaniewska	6–1, 6–3
Winner	15.	16 June 2017	25,000	ITF Padua, Italy	Clay	(Italy) Cristiana Ferrando	(Brazil) Gabriela Cé (Argentina) Catalina Pella	2–6, 6–0, [11–9]
Runner-up	18.	14 October 2017	25,000	ITF Óbidos, Portugal	Carpet	(Italy) Georgia Brescia	(Bulgaria) Elitsa Kostova (Russia) Yana Sizikova	w/o
Runner-up	19.	10 March 2018	15,000	ITF Hammamet, Tunisia	Clay	(Italy) Giorgia Marchetti	(United States) Elizabeth Halbauer (Bulgaria) Julia Stamatova	4–6, 3–6
Winner	16.	1 June 2018	25,000	ITF Grado, Italy	Clay	(Italy) Giorgia Marchetti	(Australia) Naiktha Bains (Japan) Rika Fujiwara	6–0, 6–4

== Fed Cup participation ==
=== Doubles ===
Edition	Stage	Date	Location	Against	Surface	Partner	Opponents	W/L	Score
2014 Fed Cup; World Group	R1	9 February 2014	Cleveland, United States	United States	Hard (i)	(Italy) Nastassja Burnett	(United States) Lauren Davis (United States) Madison Keys	L	2–6, 3–6
