= Anastasia Grymalska =

Italian tennis player (born 1990)

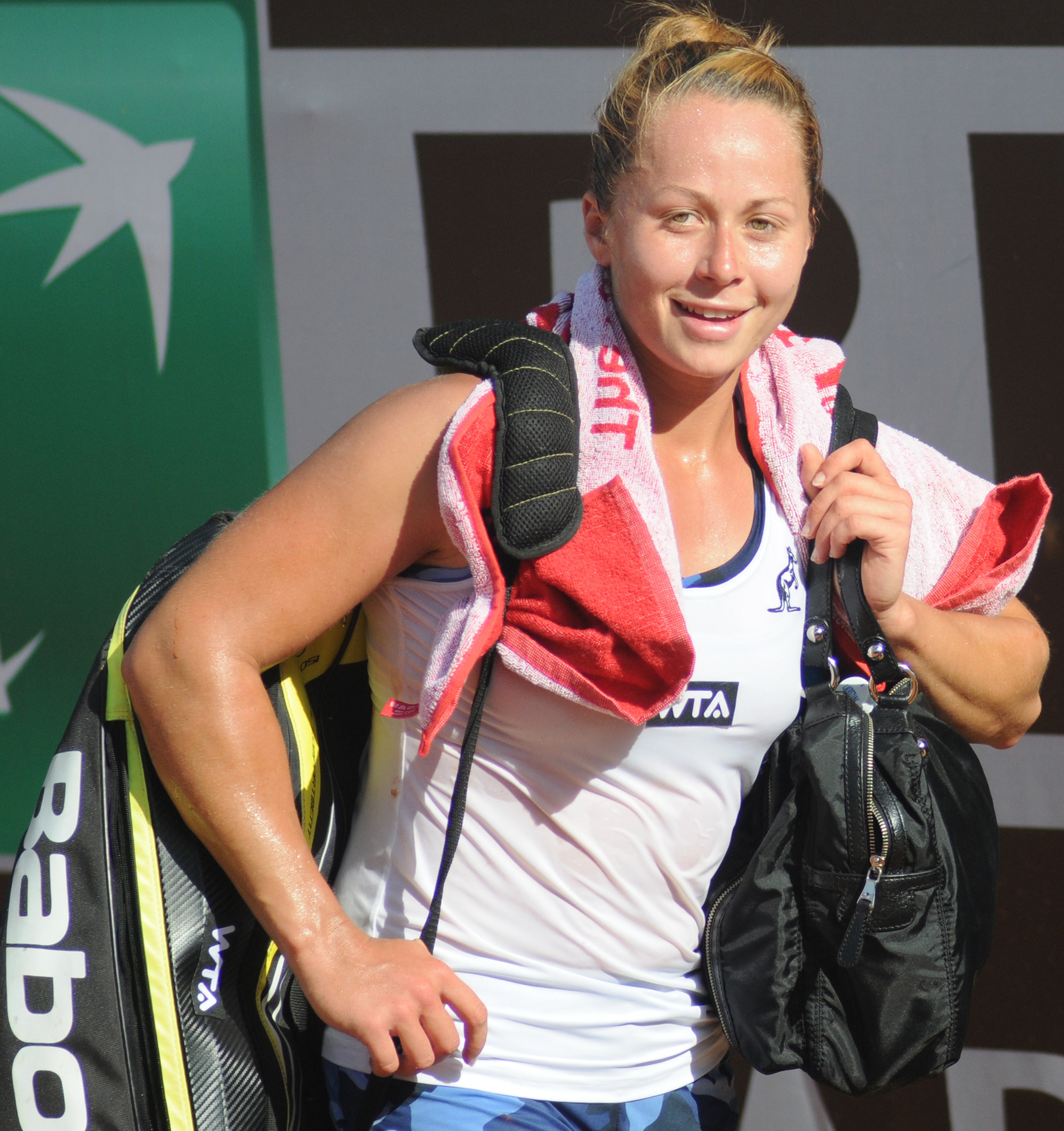
- Grymalska at the 2014 Italian Open
- Country (sports): Italy
- Born: 12 July 1990 (age 36) Kiev, Ukrainian SSR, USSR
- Turned pro: 2006
- Plays: Right (two-handed backhand)
- Prize money: $261,446

Singles
- Career record: 474–287
- Career titles: 20 ITF
- Highest ranking: No. 213 (12 May 2014)

Grand Slam singles results
- Australian Open: Q1 (2019)
- US Open: Q1 (2014)

Doubles
- Career record: 289–201
- Career titles: 34 ITF
- Highest ranking: No. 169 (10 June 2019)

Anastasia Grymalska (born 12 July 1990) is an Italian former professional tennis player.

She has a career-high WTA singles ranking of 213, achieved on 12 May 2014, and a best WTA doubles ranking of 169, reached in June 2019. Over her career, she won twenty titles in singles and thirty-four in doubles on the ITF Circuit.

Grymalska made her WTA Tour main-draw debut at the 2011 Palermo Ladies Open where she was handed a wildcard. With another wildcard, she played there the following year. At the same tournament, she made her doubles main-draw debut on the WTA Tour, partnering Gioia Barbieri.

Without wildcards, she made her main-draw debut at the 2013 Swedish Open, and the 2014 Marrakesh Grand Prix.

== ITF Circuit finals ==
=== Singles: 36 (20 titles, 16 runner-ups) ===
Legend $25,000 tournaments $10/15,000 tournaments	Finals by surface Hard (2–1) Clay (18–15)

Result	W–L	Date	Tournament	Tier	Surface	Opponent	Score
Loss	0–1	Feb 2008	ITF Arezzo, Italy	10,000	Clay (i)	(Italy) Evelyn Mayr	4–6, 3–6
Win	1–1	Aug 2009	ITF Pesaro, Italy	10,000	Clay	(Czech Republic) Kristýna Plíšková	2–6, 6–1, 6–2
Loss	1–2	Sep 2009	ITF Casale Monferrato, Italy	10,000	Clay	(Italy) Anna Remondina	6–2, 1–6, 2–6
Win	2–2	Jul 2010	ITF Gardone Val Trompia, Italy	10,000	Clay	(Italy) Paola Cigui	6–0, 6–2
Win	3–2	Oct 2010	ITF Settimo San Pietro, Italy	10,000	Clay	(Italy) Karin Knapp	4–6, 6–2, 7–5
Win	4–2	Oct 2010	ITF Vila Real de Santo António, Portugal	10,000	Clay	(Germany) Lena-Marie Hofmann	6–1, 7–5
Loss	4–3	Dec 2010	ITF Benicarló, Spain	10,000	Clay	(Venezuela) Andrea Gámiz	6–3, 2–6, 4–6
Loss	4–4	Mar 2011	ITF Gonesse, France	10,000	Clay (i)	(Germany) Anne Schäfer	5–7, 1–6
Win	5–4	Jun 2011	ITF Florence, Italy	10,000	Clay	(France) Elixane Lechemia	6–0, 4–6, 6–1
Win	6–4	Nov 2011	ITF Vinaròs, Spain	10,000	Clay	(Peru) Bianca Botto	w/o
Win	7–4	Nov 2011	ITF La Marsa, Tunisia	10,000	Clay	(Italy) Martina Caregaro	7–5, 2–6, 6–3
Win	8–4	Jan 2012	ITF Mallorca, Spain	10,000	Clay	(Poland) Barbara Sobaszkiewicz	6–1, 6–4
Win	9–4	Apr 2012	ITF San Severo, Italy	10,000	Clay	(France) Myrtille Georges	4–6, 6–1, 6–1
Loss	9–5	Aug 2012	ITF Locri, Italy	10,000	Clay	(Spain) Sara Sorribes Tormo	3–6, 5–7
Win	10–5	Feb 2013	ITF Mallorca, Spain	10,000	Clay	(Spain) Yvonne Cavallé Reimers	6–2, 7–6^{(7)}
Loss	10–6	Feb 2013	ITF Mallorca, Spain	10,000	Clay	(Germany) Dinah Pfizenmaier	4–6, 6–4, 5–7
Loss	10–7	Jun 2013	Internazionali di Brescia, Italy	25,000	Clay	(Switzerland) Viktorija Golubic	4–6, 4–6
Win	11–7	Dec 2013	ITF Duino-Aurisina, Italy	10,000	Clay	(Georgia (country)) Margalita Chakhnashvili	6–3, 6–4
Win	12–7	Jan 2014	ITF Tinajo, Spain	10,000	Hard	(South Africa) Natasha Fourouclas	6–3, 6–3
Win	13–7	Feb 2014	ITF Beinasco, Italy	25,000	Clay	(Ukraine) Anastasiya Vasylyeva	7–6^{(5)}, 6–3
Loss	13–8	Aug 2014	ITF Bagnatica, Italy	15,000	Clay	(Switzerland) Conny Perrin	3–6, 5–7
Loss	13–9	Apr 2015	ITF Sharm El Sheikh, Egypt	10,000	Hard	(Spain) Nuria Párrizas Díaz	2–6, 4–6
Win	14–9	Aug 2015	ITF Sharm El Sheikh, Egypt	10,000	Hard	(Australia) Sara Tomic	3–6, 7–6^{(7)}, 6–4
Loss	14–10	Sep 2015	ITF Pula, Italy	10,000	Clay	(Italy) Martina Trevisan	5–7, 6–3, 1–6
Loss	14–11	Nov 2015	ITF Pula, Italy	10,000	Clay	(Russia) Olesya Pervushina	6–2, 5–7, 1–6
Win	15–11	Jan 2016	ITF Hammamet, Tunisia	10,000	Clay	(France) Victoria Larrière	3–6, 6–2, 6–3
Win	16–11	Jan 2016	ITF Hammamet, Tunisia	10,000	Clay	(France) Audrey Albié	7–6^{(3)}, 6–1
Loss	16–12	Jul 2017	ITF Schio, Italy	15,000	Clay	(Italy) Stefania Rubini	7–6^{(4)}, 3–6, 4–6
Win	17–12	Dec 2017	Internazionali di Cordenons, Italy	15,000	Clay	(Switzerland) Lisa Sabino	6–2, 6–0
Loss	17–13	Mar 2018	ITF Hammamet, Tunisia	15,000	Clay	(Romania) Andreea Roșca	2–6, 2–6
Loss	17–14	Apr 2018	ITF Pula, Italy	25,000	Clay	(Slovenia) Tamara Zidanšek	3–6, 1–6
Loss	17–15	Apr 2018	ITF Pula, Italy	25,000	Clay	(Australia) Jaimee Fourlis	6–4, 4–6, 6–0
Loss	17–16	Oct 2018	ITF Pula, Italy	25,000	Clay	(Romania) Raluca Șerban	6–7^{(2)}, 4–6
Win	18–16	Nov 2018	Internazionali di Cordenons, Italy	15,000	Clay	(Italy) Anastasia Piangerelli	6–1, 6–2
Win	19–16	Aug 2021	ITF Pescara, Italy	25,000	Clay	(Italy) Anna Turati	2–6, 7–6^{(4)}, 6–3
Win	20–16	Aug 2022	ITF Pescara, Italy	15,000	Clay	(Italy) Tatiana Pieri	6–3, 3–6, 6–3

=== Doubles: 57 (34 titles, 23 runner-ups) ===
Legend $50/60,000 tournaments $25,000 tournaments $10/15,000 tournaments	Finals by surface Hard (2–2) Clay (32–20) Carpet (0–1)

Result	W–L	Date	Tournament	Tier	Surface	Partner	Opponents	Score
Loss	0–1	Aug 2007	ITF Gardone Val Trompia, Italy	10,000	Clay	(Russia) Valeria Savinykh	(Italy) Alice Balducci (France) Kildine Chevalier	6–3, 6–7, 3–6
Loss	0–2	Apr 2009	ITF Foggia, Italy	10,000	Clay	(Italy) Lara Meccico	(Netherlands) Marlot Meddens (France) Kristina Mladenovic	6–7, 0–6
Loss	0–3	Jul 2009	ITF Imola, Italy	10,000	Clay	(Bulgaria) Martina Gledacheva	(Italy) Benedetta Davato (Switzerland) Lisa Sabino	6–4, 2–6, [6–10]
Win	1–3	Aug 2009	ITF Pesaro, Italy	10,000	Clay	(Italy) Martina Trevisan	(Italy) Alice Balducci (Italy) Federica di Sarra	6–2, 6–2
Win	2–3	Oct 2009	ITF Foggia, Italy	10,000	Clay	(Italy) Gioia Barbieri	(Italy) Alice Moroni (Italy) Anna Remondina	6–4, 4–6, [10–2]
Win	3–3	Apr 2010	ITF San Severo, Italy	10,000	Clay	(Italy) Gioia Barbieri	(Russia) Karina Pimkina (Russia) Marina Shamayko	4–6, 6–2, [11–9]
Win	4–3	Jul 2010	ITF Gardone Val Trompia, Italy	10,000	Clay	(Italy) Gioia Barbieri	(Bulgaria) Julia Stamatova (France) Stéphanie Vongsouthi	6–2, 6–2
Win	5–3	Oct 2010	ITF Vila Real de Santo António, Portugal	10,000	Clay	(Italy) Alice Balducci	(France) Morgane Pons (France) Alice Tisset	6–2, 6–3
Loss	5–4	Dec 2010	ITF Benicarló, Spain	10,000	Clay	(Romania) Andreea Văideanu	(Spain) Arabela Fernández-Rabener (Russia) Anna Arina Marenko	3–6, 6–7
Win	6–4	Mar 2011	ITF Bath, United Kingdom	10,000	Hard (i)	(Italy) Giulia Gatto-Monticone	(Finland) Emma Laine (United Kingdom) Tara Moore	6–4, 2–6, [10–6]
Win	7–4	Mar 2011	ITF Gonesse, France	10,000	Clay (i)	(Italy) Gioia Barbieri	(Germany) Lena-Marie Hofmann (Germany) Scarlett Werner	6–3, 6–2
Loss	7–5	Aug 2011	ITF Monteroni, Italy	25,000	Clay	(Italy) Gioia Barbieri	(Netherlands) Kiki Bertens (Austria) Nicole Rottmann	0–6, 3–6
Loss	7–6	Oct 2011	Telavi Open, Georgia	50,000	Clay	(Georgia (country)) Ekaterine Gorgodze	(Romania) Elena Bogdan (Romania) Mihaela Buzărnescu	6–1, 1–6, [3–10]
Win	8–6	Oct 2011	ITF Yerevan, Armenia	10,000	Clay	(Ukraine) Anastasiya Vasylyeva	(Armenia) Ani Amiraghyan (Georgia (country)) Tatia Mikadze	6–3, 6–3
Win	9–6	Nov 2011	ITF Vinaròs, Spain	10,000	Clay	(Russia) Eugeniya Pashkova	(United Kingdom) Amanda Carreras (Spain) Carolina Prats Millán	6–3, 6–1
Win	10–6	Jan 2012	ITF Mallorca, Spain	10,000	Clay	(Poland) Barbara Sobaszkiewicz	(Czech Republic) Simona Dobrá (Czech Republic) Lucie Kriegsmannová	7–6, 2–6, [10–7]
Loss	10–7	Jan 2012	ITF Sunderland, United Kingdom	25,000	Hard (i)	(Italy) Martina Caciotti	(Poland) Justyna Jegiołka (Latvia) Diāna Marcinkēviča	4–6, 6–2, [6–10]
Loss	10–8	Feb 2012	ITF Rabat, Morocco	25,000	Clay	(Belarus) Ilona Kremen	(Slovakia) Jana Čepelová (Hungary) Réka Luca Jani	7–6, 1–6, [4–10]
Win	11–8	Mar 2012	ITF Antalya, Turkey	10,000	Clay	(Italy) Gioia Barbieri	(Italy) Claudia Giovine (United States) Sanaz Marand	6–4, 1–6, [11–9]
Win	12–8	Apr 2012	ITF San Severo, Italy	10,000	Clay	(Serbia) Teodora Mirčić	(Italy) Chiara Mendo (Italy) Giulia Sussarello	6–2, 6–4
Loss	12–9	May 2012	Grado Tennis Cup, Italy	25,000	Clay	(Italy) Claudia Giovine	(Georgia (country)) Margalita Chakhnashvili (Georgia (country)) Ekaterine Gorgodze	6–7, 6–7
Win	13–9	Jun 2012	ITF Padova, Italy	25,000	Clay	(Italy) Gioia Barbieri	(Italy) Federica Grazioso (Switzerland) Lisa Sabino	6–2, 6–1
Win	14–9	Aug 2012	ITF Monteroni d'Arbia, Italy	25,000	Clay	(Italy) Federica di Sarra	(Italy) Alice Balducci (Italy) Karin Knapp	6–4, 5–7, [10–7]
Win	15–9	Aug 2012	ITF Bagnatica, Italy	10,000	Clay	(Italy) Federica di Sarra	(Argentina) Tatiana Búa (Italy) Claudia Giovine	7–5, 6–2
Win	16–9	Dec 2012	ITF Antalya, Turkey	10,000	Clay	(Bulgaria) Julia Stamatova	(Belgium) Justine De Sutter (United States) Katerina Stewart	6–2, 3–6, [10–8]
Loss	16–10	Feb 2013	ITF Mallorca, Spain	10,000	Clay	(Russia) Yana Sizikova	(Spain) Leticia Costas (Hungary) Réka Luca Jani	3–6, 2–6
Win	17–10	Aug 2013	ITF Bagnatica, Italy	10,000	Clay	(Italy) Claudia Giovine	(Italy) Silvia Mocciola (Italy) Natasha Piludu	6–3, 6–3
Loss	17–11	Oct 2013	ITF Casablanca, Morocco	25,000	Clay	(Chile) Cecilia Costa Melgar	(Poland) Paula Kania (Russia) Valeria Solovyeva	6–7, 4–6
Loss	17–12	Dec 2013	ITF Duino-Aurisina, Italy	10,000	Carpet	(Colombia) Yuliana Lizarazo	(Italy) Claudia Giovine (Italy) Alice Matteucci	6–7, 1–6
Win	18–12	Aug 2014	ITF Bagnatica, Italy	15,000	Clay	(Switzerland) Conny Perrin	(France) Manon Arcangioli (Slovakia) Zuzana Zlochová	7–5, 3–6, [10–8]
Win	19–12	Sep 2014	Open de Saint-Malo, France	50,000	Clay	(Italy) Giulia Gatto-Monticone	(Argentina) Tatiana Búa (Spain) Beatriz García Vidagany	6–3, 6–1
Loss	19–13	Apr 2015	ITF Sharm El Sheikh, Egypt	10,000	Hard	(Italy) Giada Clerici	(Russia) Yulia Bryzgalova (Russia) Alina Mikheeva	3–6, 1–6
Win	20–13	Aug 2015	ITF Bagnatica, Italy	15,000	Clay	(Belarus) Ilona Kremen	(Italy) Alice Balducci (France) Sherazad Reix	6–4, 6–2
Loss	20–14	Oct 2015	ITF Pula, Italy	10,000	Clay	(Italy) Corinna Dentoni	(Italy) Alice Balducci (Italy) Martina di Giuseppe	w/o
Win	21–14	Nov 2015	ITF Pula, Italy	10,000	Clay	(Italy) Martina di Giuseppe	(Italy) Federica Bilardo (Russia) Olesya Pervushina	6–2, 6–4
Win	22–14	Jan 2016	ITF Hammamet, Tunisia	10,000	Clay	(Belarus) Ilona Kremen	(Canada) Petra Januskova (Italy) Angelica Moratelli	7–6^{(5)}, 6–1
Loss	22–15	Jan 2016	ITF Hammamet, Tunisia	10,000	Clay	(Belarus) Ilona Kremen	(Russia) Nika Kukharchuk (Moldova) Alexandra Perper	3–6, 5–7
Win	23–15	Feb 2016	ITF Hammamet, Tunisia	10,000	Clay	(Belgium) Déborah Kerfs	(Greece) Eleni Kordolaimi (Moldova) Alexandra Perper	w/o
Loss	23–16	Jul 2017	ITF Schio, Italy	15,000	Clay	(Italy) Maria Masini	(Italy) Federica di Sarra (Switzerland) Lisa Sabino	0–6, 1–6
Win	24–16	Aug 2017	ITF Vienna, Austria	15,000	Clay	(Italy) Dalila Spiteri	(Mexico) Ana Sofía Sánchez (Italy) Lucrezia Stefanini	0–6, 6–3, [10–8]
Win	25–16	Aug 2017	Internazionali di Cuneo, Italy	15,000	Clay	(Italy) Federica di Sarra	(Argentina) Melina Ferrero (Argentina) Sofía Luini	6–0, 6–1
Win	26–16	Sep 2017	ITF Pula, Italy	25,000	Clay	(Italy) Claudia Giovine	(Italy) Martina Caregaro (Italy) Martina di Giuseppe	3–6, 7–5, [10–4]
Win	27–16	Oct 2017	ITF Pula, Italy	25,000	Clay	(United States) Chiara Scholl	(Slovakia) Michaela Hončová (Japan) Akiko Omae	4–6, 6–3, [13–11]
Loss	27–17	Nov 2017	ITF Pula, Italy	25,000	Clay	(Ukraine) Ganna Poznikhirenko	(Italy) Claudia Giovine (Italy) Camilla Rosatello	2–6, 6–2, [7–10]
Loss	27–18	Nov 2017	ITF Hammamet, Tunisia	15,000	Clay	(Italy) Giorgia Marchetti	(Serbia) Tamara Čurović (Germany) Lisa Ponomar	4–6, 6–7^{(7)}
Win	28–18	Mar 2018	ITF Hammamet, Tunisia	15,000	Clay	(Italy) Michele Alexandra Zmău	(Argentina) Guillermina Naya (Argentina) Guadalupe Pérez Rojas	6–2, 6–3
Loss	28–19	Mar 2018	ITF Pula, Italy	25,000	Clay	(Czech Republic) Anastasia Zarycká	(Russia) Valentyna Ivakhnenko (Russia) Valeriya Solovyeva	3–6, 6–3, [5–10]
Loss	28–20	Apr 2018	Nana Trophy, Tunisia	25,000	Clay	(Russia) Amina Anshba	(Ukraine) Maryna Chernyshova (Australia) Seone Mendez	6–7^{(5)}, 4–6
Loss	28–21	Jul 2018	Internazionali di Roma, Italy	60,000	Clay	(Italy) Giorgia Marchetti	(Brazil) Laura Pigossi (Mexico) Renata Zarazúa	1–6, 6–4, [11–13]
Win	29–21	Sep 2018	ITF Pula, Italy	25,000	Clay	(Italy) Federica di Sarra	(Italy) Deborah Chiesa (Italy) Tatiana Pieri	7–6^{(3)}, 6–2
Loss	29–22	Nov 2018	ITF Pula, Italy	25,000	Clay	(Italy) Federica di Sarra	(Romania) Cristina Dinu (Romania) Andreea Mitu	w/o
Win	30–22	Nov 2018	Internazionali di Cordenons, Italy	15,000	Clay	(Italy) Lucia Bronzetti	(Italy) Verena Hofer (Italy) Maria Vittoria Viviani	7–5, 7–5
Win	31–22	Jan 2019	Playford International, Australia	25,000	Hard	(Italy) Giulia Gatto-Monticone	(Australia) Amber Marshall (Switzerland) Lulu Sun	6–2, 6–3
Win	32–22	Apr 2019	Nana Trophy, Tunisia	25,000	Clay	(Italy) Martina Colmegna	(Romania) Jaqueline Cristian (Romania) Andreea Roșca	6–4, 6–2
Win	33–22	Apr 2019	ITF Pula, Italy	25,000	Clay	(Italy) Federica di Sarra	(Italy) Giorgia Marchetti (Italy) Camilla Rosatello	6–4, 6–1
Loss	33–23	Jun 2019	Internazionali di Brescia, Italy	60,000	Clay	(Italy) Giorgia Marchetti	(Venezuela) Andrea Gámiz (Brazil) Paula Cristina Gonçalves	3–6, 6–4, [10–12]
Win	34–23	Aug 2022	ITF Pescara, Italy	15,000	Clay	(Germany) Anne Schäfer	(Italy) Giorgia Pinto (Italy) Gaia Squarcialupi	5–7, 6–1, [12–10]
