= Anna-Giulia Remondina =

Italian tennis player

- Country (sports): Italy
- Born: 1 June 1989 (age 37) Massa, Italy
- Plays: Right-handed (two-handed backhand)
- Prize money: US$ 138,760

Singles
- Career record: 443–291
- Career titles: 10 ITF
- Highest ranking: No. 219 (2 May 2011)

Doubles
- Career record: 124–138
- Career titles: 4 ITF
- Highest ranking: No. 444 (12 August 2013)

Anna-Giulia Remondina (born 1 June 1989) is an Italian former tennis player. On 2 May 2011, she reached her highest WTA singles ranking of 219, whilst her best doubles ranking was 444 on 12 August 2013.

She made her WTA Tour main-draw debut at the 2011 Budapest Grand Prix, qualifying as a lucky loser.

== ITF Circuit finals ==
Legend
$25,000 tournaments
$15,000 tournaments
$10,000 tournaments

=== Singles: 24 (10 titles, 14 runner-ups) ===
Result	No.	Date	Tournament	Tier	Surface	Opponent	Score
Win	1.	28 August 2006	ITF Vittoria, Italy	10,000	Clay	(Romania) Oana Elena Golimbioschi	6–0, 6–4
Win	2.	2 July 2007	ITF Cremona, Italy	10,000	Clay	(Italy) Elena Pioppo	6–4, 2–6, 6–2
Win	3.	6 August 2007	ITF Jesi, Italy	10,000	Carpet	(Italy) Federica Di Sarra	4–6, 6–1, 7–6
Loss	1.	7 April 2008	ITF Foggia, Italy	10,000	Clay	(Italy) Alexia Virgili	4–6, 6–0, 4–6
Loss	2.	2 May 2009	ITF Brescia, Italy	10,000	Clay	(Ukraine) Irina Buryachok	3–6, 3–6
Loss	3.	22 June 2009	ITF Davos, Switzerland	10,000	Clay	(Bosnia and Herzegovina) Sandra Martinović	1–6, 3–6
Win	4.	6 July 2009	ITF Imola, Italy	10,000	Carpet	(Italy) Alice Balducci	6–2, 7–5
Loss	4.	1 August 2009	ITF Gardone Val Trompia, Italy	10,000	Clay	(Italy) Julia Mayr	0–6, 0–6
Win	5.	12 September 2009	ITF Casale Monferrato, Italy	10,000	Clay	(Italy) Anastasia Grymalska	2–6, 6–1, 6–2
Win	6.	5 October 2009	ITF Foggia, Italy	10,000	Clay	(Italy) Claudia Giovine	7–5, 1–6, 7–6
Win	7.	1 March 2010	ITF Lyon, France	10,000	Hard (i)	(Poland) Anna Korzeniak	6–1, 7–6
Win	8.	28 February 2011	ITF Lyon, France	10,000	Hard	(France) Claire Feuerstein	7–6, 6–3
Win	9.	16 April 2011	ITF Pomezia, Italy	10,000	Clay	(Romania) Cristina Dinu	5–7, 6–2, 6–3
Loss	5.	18 April 2011	ITF Civitavecchia, Italy	25,000	Clay	(Spain) María Teresa Torró Flor	3–6, 4–6
Loss	6.	8 August 2011	ITF Monteroni, Italy	25,000	Clay	(Italy) Nastassja Burnett	3–6, 6–7
Loss	7.	23 January 2012	Open Andrézieux-Bouthéon, France	25,000	Hard (i)	(Czech Republic) Kristýna Plíšková	2–6, 2–6
Loss	8.	18 February 2013	ITF Mâcon, France	10,000	Hard (i)	(Germany) Antonia Lottner	5–7, 5–7
Loss	9.	3 February 2014	ITF Tinajo, Spain	10,000	Hard	(Spain) Laura Pous Tió	3–6, 6–3, 2–6
Win	10.	10 March 2014	ITF Gonesse, France	10,000	Clay	(Germany) Anne Schäfer	7–5, 7–6
Loss	10.	27 July 2014	ITF Viserba, Italy	10,000	Clay	(Italy) Jasmine Paolini	1–6, 0–6
Loss	11.	7 September 2014	ITF Sankt Pölten, Austria	10,000	Clay	(Austria) Barbara Haas	6–7, 6–0, 1–6
Loss	12.	27 June 2015	ITF Rome, Italy	10,000	Clay	(Switzerland) Lisa Sabino	6–1, 3–6, 3–6
Loss	13.	1 May 2016	ITF Pula, Italy	10,000	Clay	(Italy) Camilla Scala	1–6, 7–5, 1–6
Loss	14.	12 November 2016	ITF Solarino, Italy	10,000	Carpet	(Italy) Dalila Spiteri	1–6, 2–6

=== Doubles: 20 (4 titles, 16 runner-ups) ===
Outcome	No.	Date	Tournament	Surface	Tier	Partner	Opponents	Score
Winner	1.	28 August 2006	ITF Vittoria, Italy	Clay	10,000	(Italy) Federica Denti	(Italy) Emilia Desiderio (Belgium) Davinia Lobbinger	6–4, 6–3
Runner-up	1.	22 October 2007	ITF Augusta, Italy	Clay	10,000	(Italy) Letizia Lo Re	(Italy) Anna Floris (Italy) Valentina Sulpizio	1–6, 1–6
Runner-up	2.	13 October 2008	ITF Settimo San Pietro, Italy	Clay	10,000	(Italy) Francesca Campigotto	(Italy) Nancy Rustignoli (Italy) Elisa Salis	w/o
Runner-up	3.	27 July 2009	ITF Gardone Val Trompia, Italy	Clay	10,000	(Italy) Stefania Fadabini	(Italy) Stefania Chieppa (Italy) Claudia Giovine	6–4, 2–6, [10–12]
Runner-up	4.	5 October 2009	ITF Foggia, Italy	Clay	10,000	(Italy) Alice Moroni	(Italy) Gioia Barbieri (Italy) Anastasia Grymalska	4–6, 6–4, [2–10]
Runner-up	5.	18 February 2013	ITF Mâcon, France	Hard (i)	10,000	(Italy) Francesca Palmigiano	(Germany) Antonia Lottner (Russia) Daria Salnikova	4–6, 7–5, [7–10]
Runner-up	6.	3 March 2014	ITF Amiens, France	Clay (i)	10,000	(Italy) Angelica Moratelli	(Bulgaria) Isabella Shinikova (Ukraine) Alyona Sotnikova	1–6, 4–6
Runner-up	7.	14 July 2014	ITF Imola, Italy	Carpet	15,000	(Switzerland) Lisa Sabino	(United Kingdom) Katie Boulter (United Kingdom) Katy Dunne	6–7, 3–6
Runner-up	8.	13 April 2015	ITF Pula, Italy	Clay	10,000	(Italy) Giorgia Marchetti	(Italy) Alice Matteucci (Italy) Martina Trevisan	2–6, 3–6
Runner-up	9.	30 May 2015	ITF Galați, Romania	Clay	10,000	(Germany) Charlotte Klasen	(Moldova) Daniela Ciobanu (Moldova) Alexandra Perper	2–6, 6–3, [10–12]
Winner	2.	27 June 2015	ITF Rome, Italy	Clay	10,000	(Italy) Martina Di Giuseppe	(Italy) Giulia Carbonaro (Italy) Federica Spazzacampagna	4–6, 6–2, [10–3]
Runner-up	10.	8 May 2016	ITF Pula, Italy	Clay	10,000	(Italy) Veronica Napolitano	(Italy) Federica Arcidiacono (Italy) Gaia Sanesi	4–6, 1–6
Runner-up	11.	5 August 2016	ITF Tarvisio, Italy	Clay	10,000	(Italy) Angelica Moratelli	(Italy) Chiara Quattrone (Italy) Ludmilla Samsonova	6–3, 4–6, [6–10]
Runner-up	12.	4 November 2016	ITF Pula, Italy	Clay	10,000	(Italy) Dalila Spiteri	(Switzerland) Ylena In-Albon (Italy) Giorgia Marchetti	1–6, 3–6
Winner	3.	19 November 2016	ITF Solarino, Italy	Carpet	10,000	(Italy) Dalila Spiteri	(France) Mathilde Arminato (France) Elixane Lechemia	w/o
Runner-up	13.	10 December 2016	ITF Ortisei, Italy	Hard (i)	10,000	(Kyrgyzstan) Ksenia Palkina	(Romania) Laura-Ioana Andrei (Germany) Sarah-Rebecca Sekulic	2–6, 3–6
Runner-up	14.	27 August 2017	Hódmezővásárhely Open, Hungary	Clay	25,000	(Italy) Martina Di Giuseppe	(Romania) Elena-Gabriela Ruse (Netherlands) Eva Wacanno	3–6, 1–6
Winner	4.	3 December 2017	ITF Hammamet, Tunisia	Clay	15,000	(Italy) Miriana Tona	(Bosnia and Herzegovina) Jelena Simić (France) Jade Suvrijn	6–3, 6–4
Runner-up	15.	9 December 2017	ITF Hammamet, Tunisia	Clay	15,000	(Serbia) Milana Spremo	(Belgium) Marie Benoît (Bulgaria) Julia Terziyska	2–6, 3–6
Runner-up	16.	7 October 2018	ITF Pula, Italy	Clay	25,000	(Italy) Martina Di Giuseppe	(Russia) Amina Anshba (Georgia (country)) Sofia Shapatava	6–7^{(5)}, 6–2, [6–10]
