= Claudia Giovine =

Italian tennis player (born 1990)

- Country (sports): Italy
- Residence: Brindisi, Italy
- Born: 18 July 1990 (age 35) Brindisi
- Plays: Right (two-handed backhand)
- Prize money: $158,842

Singles
- Career record: 370–263
- Career titles: 12 ITF
- Highest ranking: No. 257 (9 August 2010)

Doubles
- Career record: 242–157
- Career titles: 26 ITF
- Highest ranking: No. 190 (6 June 2011)

Claudia Giovine (Italian pronunciation: [ˈklaudja ˈdʒoːvine]; born 18 July 1990) is an Italian former tennis player.

On 9 August 2010, she reached her career-high singles ranking of world No. 257, whilst her best WTA doubles ranking is 190, achieved on 6 June 2011.

In her career, Giovine won twelve titles in singles and twenty-six in doubles at tournaments of the ITF Women's Circuit. She was coached by Elvy Intiglietta.

Her cousin is former tennis player Flavia Pennetta.

== ITF Circuit finals ==
Legend
$50,000 tournaments
$25,000 tournaments
$10/15,000 tournaments

=== Singles: 21 (12 titles, 9 runner-ups) ===
Result	W–L	Date	Tournament	Tier	Surface	Opponent	Score
Win	1–0	Jul 2008	ITF Jesi, Italy	10,000	Hard	(Italy) Cristina Celani	6–2, 6–3
Loss	1–1	Sep 2008	ITF Ciampino, Italy	10,000	Clay	(Italy) Alexia Virgili	5–7, 6–2, 2–6
Loss	1–2	Jun 2009	ITF Monteroni, Italy	25,000	Clay	(Croatia) Ivana Lisjak	4–6, 2–6
Loss	1–3	Oct 2009	ITF Foggia, Italy	10,000	Clay	(Italy) Anna Remondina	5–7, 6–1, 6–7
Win	2–3	Feb 2010	ITF Portimão, Portugal	10,000	Hard	(Netherlands) Kiki Bertens	3–6, 6–2, 7–6^{(1)}
Win	3–3	Jul 2013	ITF Torino, Italy	10,000	Clay	(Italy) Federica di Sarra	4–6, 7–6^{(6)}, 6–2
Loss	3–4	Sep 2013	ITF Pula, Italy	10,000	Clay	(Italy) Alice Matteucci	7–5, 2–6, 5–7
Loss	3–5	Sep 2013	ITF Pula, Italy	10,000	Clay	(Italy) Alice Balducci	2–6, 4–6
Win	4–5	Jan 2014	ITF Tinajo, Spain	10,000	Hard	(Spain) Laura Pous Tió	6–3, 0–6, 6–2
Loss	4–6	Sep 2014	ITF Antalya, Turkey	10,000	Hard	(Austria) Lisa-Maria Moser	5–7, 4–6
Win	5–6	Oct 2014	ITF Pula, Italy	10,000	Clay	(Netherlands) Janneke Wikkerink	3–6, 3–6
Loss	5–7	Nov 2014	ITF Pula, Italy	10,000	Clay	(Germany) Anne Schäfer	0–6, 3–6
Win	6–7	Mar 2016	ITF Hammamet, Tunisia	10,000	Clay	(Romania) Elena Gabriela Ruse	6–4, 6–0
Win	7–7	Sep 2016	ITF Trieste, Italy	10,000	Clay	(Italy) Deborah Chiesa	7–5, 0–6, 6–2
Win	8–7	Oct 2016	ITF Pula, Italy	10,000	Clay	(Italy) Alice Balducci	6–4, 6–3
Loss	8–8	Aug 2017	ITF Sezze, Italy	15,000	Clay	(Russia) Maria Marfutina	4–6, 4–6
Win	9–8	Sep 2018	ITF Monastir, Tunisia	15,000	Hard	(Sweden) Susanne Celik	6–3, 6–3
Win	10–8	Dec 2018	ITF Monastir, Tunisia	15,000	Hard	(United States) Chiara Scholl	6–0, 6–0
Win	11–8	Dec 2018	ITF Monastir, Tunisia	15,000	Hard	(United States) Chiara Scholl	6–1, 7–6^{(6)}
Loss	11–9	Jul 2019	ITF Imola, Italy	25,000	Carpet	(Italy) Stefania Rubini	3–6, 3–6
Win	12–9	Nov 2019	ITF Ortisei, Italy	15,000	Hard (i)	(Germany) Anja Wildgruber	4–6, 6–1, 6–1

=== Doubles: 51 (26 titles, 25 runner-ups) ===
Result	No.	Date	Tournament	Surface	Partner	Opponents	Score
Win	1	Aug 2007	ITF Pesaro, Italy	Clay	(Romania) Andreea Văideanu	(Spain) Melissa Cabrera-Handt (Spain) Carolina Gago Fuentes	6–4, 6–0
Win	2	Aug 2007	ITF Vittoria, Italy	Clay	(Italy) Valentina Sulpizio	(Spain) Lucia Gatti (Spain) Gabriella Polito	6–2, 6–1
Win	3	Jul 2008	ITF Imola, Italy	Carpet	(Italy) Erika Zanchetta	(United States) Sabrina Capannolo (United States) Christian Thompson	7–6^{(5)}, 6–4
Win	4	Sep 2008	ITF Ciampino, Italy	Clay	(Russia) Regina Kulikova	(Italy) Stefania Chieppa (Italy) Lisa Sabino	6–4, 4–6, [10–7]
Win	5	Mar 2009	ITF Rome, Italy	Clay	(Italy) Valentina Sulpizio	(Bosnia and Herzegovina) Jasmina Kajtazovic (Spain) Lucía Sainz	4–6, 6–0, [10–6]
Loss	1	Mar 2009	ITF Rome, Italy	Clay	(Italy) Valentina Sulpizio	(Poland) Karolina Kosińska (Czech Republic) Simona Dobrá	3–6, 4–6
Win	6	May 2009	ITF Castel Gandolfo, Italy	Clay	(Italy) Stefania Chieppa	(Italy) Stefania Fadabini (Italy) Anna Remondina	4–6, 6–2, [12–10]
Loss	2	Jun 2010	ITF Padova, Italy	Clay	(Italy) Valentina Sulpizio	(Austria) Sandra Klemenschits (Slovenia) Andreja Klepač	6–4, 4–6, [5–10]
Loss	3	Jun 2010	ITF Rome, Italy	Clay	(Italy) Valentina Sulpizio	(Australia) Sophie Ferguson (Australia) Trudi Musgrave	0–6, 3–6
Win	7	Aug 2010	ITF Monteroni d'Arbia, Italy	Clay	(Italy) Valentina Sulpizio	(Italy) Evelyn Mayr (Italy) Julia Mayr	6–2, 4–6, [10–5]
Win	8	Sep 2010	Save Cup, Italy	Clay	(Italy) Karin Knapp	(Slovenia) Andreja Klepač (Czech Republic) Eva Birnerová	6–7^{(6)}, 7–5, [13–11]
Loss	4	Apr 2011	ITF Pomezia, Italy	Clay	(Italy) Valentina Sulpizio	(Italy) Benedetta Davato (Switzerland) Lisa Sabino	7–6, 4–6, 4–6
Loss	5	May 2011	ITF Reggio Emilia, Italy	Clay	(Argentina) María Irigoyen	(Australia) Sally Peers (Australia) Sophie Ferguson	4–6, 1–6
Win	9	Jul 2011	ITF Vigo, Spain	Hard	(Germany) Justine Ozga	(Argentina) Vanesa Furlanetto (Argentina) Aranza Salut	6–1, 6–3
Win	10	Feb 2012	ITF Antalya, Turkey	Clay	(Germany) Anne Schäfer	(United Kingdom) Nicola Slater (United States) Sanaz Marand	6–3, 3–6, [10–7]
Loss	6	Mar 2012	ITF Antalya, Turkey	Clay	(United States) Sanaz Marand	(Italy) Gioia Barbieri (Italy) Anastasia Grymalska	4–6, 6–1, [9–11]
Loss	7	Mar 2012	ITF Antalya, Turkey	Clay	(Serbia) Teodora Mirčić	(Italy) Evelyn Mayr (Italy) Julia Mayr	2–6, 3–6
Loss	8	Apr 2012	ITF Civitavecchia, Italy	Clay	(Russia) Marina Shamayko	(Romania) Raluca Olaru (Romania) Elena Bogdan	3–6, 5–7
Loss	9	May 2012	Grado Tennis Cup, Italy	Clay	(Italy) Anastasia Grymalska	(Georgia (country)) Margalita Chakhnashvili (Georgia (country)) Ekaterine Gorgodze	6–7, 6–7
Loss	10	Aug 2012	ITF Bagnatica, Italy	Clay	(Argentina) Tatiana Búa	(Italy) Anastasia Grymalska (Italy) Federica di Sarra	5–7, 2–6
Loss	11	Jun 2013	ITF Rome, Italy	Clay	(Italy) Jasmine Paolini	(Romania) Bianca Hîncu (Italy) Martina di Giuseppe	1–6, 3–6
Loss	12	Jul 2013	Internazionali di Todi, Italy	Clay	(Japan) Yuka Mori	(Armenia) Ani Amiraghyan (Italy) Alice Balducci	2–6, 3–6
Win	11	Aug 2013	ITF Bagnatica, Italy	Clay	(Italy) Anastasia Grymalska	(Italy) Silvia Mocciola (Italy) Natasha Piludu	6–3, 6–3
Win	12.	Sep 2013	ITF Pula, Italy	Clay	(Italy) Alice Matteucci	(Germany) Carolin Daniels (Germany) Laura Schaeder	1–6, 6–3, [10–5]
Win	13.	Dec 2013	ITF Duino-Aurisina, Italy	Clay (i)	(Italy) Alice Matteucci	(Italy) Anastasia Grymalska (Colombia) Yuliana Lizarazo	7–6^{(4)}, 6–1
Loss	13	Jan 2014	ITF Tinajo, Spain	Hard	(Italy) Alice Matteucci	(Netherlands) Charlotte van der Meij (Netherlands) Kelly Versteeg	6–2, 6–7^{(5)}, [6–10]
Loss	14	Feb 2014	AK Ladies Open, Germany	Carpet (i)	(Germany) Justine Ozga	(Germany) Carolin Daniels (Germany) Laura Schaeder	6–1, 4–6, [7–10]
Win	14	Apr 2014	ITF Pula, Italy	Clay	(Romania) Diana Buzean	(Italy) Martina Caregaro (Italy) Anna Floris	6–2, 6–4
Win	15	Dec 2014	ITF Sharm El Sheikh, Egypt	Hard	(Czech Republic) Nikola Fraňková	(Russia) Anna Morgina (Russia) Anastasia Pribylova	7–6^{(1)}, 4–6, [10–6]
Win	16	Feb 2015	GB Pro-Series Glasgow, United Kingdom	Hard (i)	(Italy) Corinna Dentoni	(United Kingdom) Tara Moore (Switzerland) Conny Perrin	0–6, 6–1, [10–7]
Win	17	Mar 2015	ITF Pula, Italy	Clay	(Belgium) Kimberley Zimmermann	(Romania) Irina Bara (Hungary) Lilla Barzó	7–6^{(4)}, 6–3
Loss	15	Apr 2015	ITF Pula, Italy	Clay	(Italy) Corinna Dentoni	(Romania) Mihaela Buzărnescu (Romania) Irina Bara	3–6, 6–2, [4–10]
Win	18	Jul 2015	ITF Imola, Italy	Carpet	(Switzerland) Xenia Knoll	(Greece) Despina Papamichail (United States) Bernarda Pera	7–5, 6–2
Win	19	Jul 2015	ITF Rome, Italy	Clay	(Greece) Despina Papamichail	(United Kingdom) Tara Moore (Switzerland) Conny Perrin	6–4, 7–6^{(2)}
Win	20	Aug 2015	ITF Woking, United Kingdom	Hard	(Greece) Despina Papamichail	(United Kingdom) Harriet Dart (United Kingdom) Katy Dunne	6–2, 6–1
Loss	16	Mar 2016	ITF Hammamet, Tunisia	Clay	(Italy) Alice Balducci	(Italy) Georgia Brescia (Greece) Despina Papamichail	6–4, 2–6, [7–10]
Loss	17	Mar 2016	ITF Hammamet, Tunisia	Clay	(India) Snehadevi Reddy	(Austria) Julia Grabher (Australia) Isabelle Wallace	1–6, 3–6
Win	21	Jun 2016	ITF Rome, Italy	Clay	(Poland) Katarzyna Piter	(Venezuela) Andrea Gámiz (Hungary) Réka Luca Jani	6–3, 3–6, [10–7]
Loss	18	Oct 2016	ITF Pula, Italy	Clay	(Italy) Camilla Rosatello	(Switzerland) Jil Teichmann (Slovenia) Tamara Zidanšek	2–6, 4–6
Win	22	Sep 2017	ITF Pula, Italy	Clay	(Italy) Anastasia Grymalska	(Italy) Martina Caregaro (Italy) Martina di Giuseppe	3–6, 7–5, [10–4]
Win	23	Sep 2017	ITF Pula, Italy	Clay	(Croatia) Tereza Mrdeža	(Brazil) Gabriela Cé (Argentina) Catalina Pella	6–3, 6–1
Win	24	Nov 2017	ITF Pula, Italy	Clay	(Italy) Camilla Rosatello	(Italy) Anastasia Grymalska (Ukraine) Ganna Poznikhirenko	6–2, 2–6, [10–7]
Win	25	Dec 2017	ITF Hammamet, Tunisia	Clay	(Italy) Giorgia Marchetti	(France) Victoria Muntean (Bulgaria) Isabella Shinikova	6–3, 6–1
Loss	19	Dec 2017	ITF Hammamet, Tunisia	Clay	(Italy) Giorgia Marchetti	(France) Audrey Albié (France) Mathilde Armitano	2–6, 4–6
Loss	20	Feb 2018	ITF Bergamo, Italy	Clay (i)	(Italy) Martina Colmegna	(Russia) Kseniia Bekker (Kyrgyzstan) Ksenia Palkina	4–6, 6–4, [8–10]
Loss	21	Jul 2018	ITF Imola, Italy	Carpet	(Slovenia) Manca Pislak	(Italy) Federica di Sarra (Italy) Giorgia Marchetti	3–6, 1–6
Win	26	Sep 2018	ITF Monastir, Tunisia	Hard	(Italy) Martina Biagianti	(Venezuela) Nadia Echeverria Alam (United Kingdom) Anna Popescu	6–1, 6–2
Loss	22	Dec 2018	ITF Monastir, Tunisia	Hard	(United Kingdom) Ali Collins	(Serbia) Tamara Čurović (United States) Chiara Scholl	6–7^{(5)}, 4–6
Loss	23	Mar 2019	ITF Mâcon, France	Hard (i)	(Italy) Angelica Moratelli	(Netherlands) Lesley Kerkhove (Netherlands) Bibiane Schoofs	2–6, 4–6
Loss	24	Nov 2019	ITF Ortisei, Italy	Hard (i)	(Russia) Maria Marfutina	(Czech Republic) Klara Hajková (Czech Republic) Aneta Laboutková	3–6, 6–3, [7–10]
Loss	25	Oct 2020	ITF Lousada, Portugal	Hard (i)	(Italy) Angelica Moratelli	(Switzerland) Susan Bandecchi (Belgium) Lara Salden	4–6, 3–6
