= Lisa Sabino =

Italian-Swiss tennis player

- Country (sports): Switzerland (2010 May–present); Italy (2005–2010 February)
- Born: 26 July 1986 (age 39) Mendrisio, Switzerland
- Coach: Alessandro Galli
- Prize money: US$ 147,973

Singles
- Career record: 454–297
- Career titles: 17 ITF
- Highest ranking: No. 315 (1 December 2008)

Doubles
- Career record: 246–128
- Career titles: 34 ITF
- Highest ranking: No. 292 (10 August 2009)

Lisa Sabino (Italian pronunciation: [ˈliːza saˈbiːno]; born 26 July 1986) is a former professional tennis player who played for Italy and Switzerland.

== Career summary ==
Sabino won 17 singles and 34 doubles titles on the ITF Circuit. Her career-high WTA rankings are No. 315 in singles, achieved on 1 December 2008, and 292 in doubles, set on 10 August 2009.

The best juniors ranking she reached is No. 73, and she also played the Roland Garros junior competition. In 2013, she played for Switzerland at the XXVII Universiade in Kazan, Russia, where she won the bronze medal in mixed doubles.

== ITF Circuit finals ==
Legend
$50,000 tournaments
$25,000 tournaments
$15,000 tournaments
$10,000 tournaments

=== Singles: 32 (17 titles, 15 runner-ups) ===
Result	No.	Date	Tournament	Surface	Opponent	Score
Win	1.	4 August 2006	ITF Gardone Val Trompia, Italy	Clay	(Argentina) Maria-Belen Corbalan	1–6, 6–1, 6–4
Win	2.	25 March 2007	ITF Rome, Italy	Clay	(Spain) Eva Fernández Brugués	6–3, 6–1
Loss	1.	15 June 2007	ITF Annaba, Algeria	Clay	(Netherlands) Romana Janshen	6–7^{(3)}, 6–4, 2–6
Win	3.	22 June 2007	ITF Annaba, Algeria	Clay	(Austria) Nicole Rottmann	6–3, 6–3
Loss	2.	27 April 2008	ITF Naples, Italy	Clay	(Australia) Christina Wheeler	4–6, 6–7^{(4)}
Win	4.	4 May 2008	ITF Brescia, Italy	Clay	(Austria) Patricia Mayr-Achleitner	6–3, 6–3
Win	5.	11 May 2008	ITF Vic, Spain	Clay	(Belarus) Anna Orlik	w/o
Win	6.	24 May 2008	ITF Gorizia, Italy	Clay	(Italy) Stefania Chieppa	6–1, 6–0
Win	7.	25 July 2008	ITF Rabat, Morocco	Clay	(Russia) Valeria Savinykh	6–1, 6–4
Loss	3.	1 August 2008	ITF Rabat, Morocco	Clay	(Morocco) Lamia Essaadi	6–7^{(4)}, 2–6
Loss	4.	15 August 2008	ITF Pesaro, Italy	Clay	(Italy) Alice Moroni	1–6, 6–3, 3–6
Loss	5.	15 February 2009	ITF Albufeira, Portugal	Hard	(Czech Republic) Darina Sedenková	3–6, 2–6
Win	8.	5 July 2009	ITF Cremona, Italy	Clay	(Switzerland) Xenia Knoll	6–4, 7–6^{(3)}
Loss	6.	25 July 2009	ITF Casablanca, Morocco	Clay	(Russia) Galina Fokina	1–6, 2–6
Win	9.	12 June 2011	ITF Madrid, Spain	Clay	(Bulgaria) Isabella Shinikova	7–5, 6–3
Loss	7.	25 March 2012	ITF Antalya, Turkey	Clay	(Croatia) Ana Savić	0–5 ret.
Loss	8.	27 October 2013	ITF Heraklion, Greece	Carpet	(Germany) Lena-Marie Hofmann	4–6, 6–4, 0–6
Loss	9.	1 December 2013	ITF Nules, Greece	Clay	(Spain) Olga Sáez Larra	3–6, 2–6
Loss	10.	2 August 2014	ITF Rovereto, Italy	Clay	(Spain) Laura Pous Tió	2–6, 6–4, 1–6
Win	10.	30 August 2014	ITF Caslano, Switzerland	Clay	(Italy) Georgia Brescia	4–6, 6–0, 7–5
Win	11.	14 June 2015	ITF Adana, Turkey	Clay	(Slovakia) Lenka Wienerová	6–2, 6–1
Win	12.	27 June 2015	ITF Rome, Italy	Clay	(Italy) Anna-Giulia Remondina	1–6, 6–3, 6–3
Loss	11.	1 August 2015	ITF Rome, Italy	Clay	(Italy) Martina Trevisan	1–6, 3–6
Loss	12.	20 March 2016	ITF Antalya, Turkey	Clay	(Czech Republic) Markéta Vondroušová	2–6, 0–6
Win	13.	22 May 2016	ITF Hammamet, Tunisia	Clay	(Egypt) Sandra Samir	4–6, 7–5, 6–4
Win	14.	23 July 2016	ITF Don Benito, Spain	Carpet	(Spain) María José Luque Moreno	6–0, 6–3
Win	15.	22 July 2017	ITF Don Benito, Spain	Carpet	(Spain) María José Luque Moreno	6–1, 6–2
Loss	13.	7 October 2017	ITF Telde, Spain (Gran Canaria)	Clay	(Spain) Guiomar Maristany	5–7, 6–4, 4–6
Win	16.	26 November 2017	ITF Heraklion, Greece	Clay	(Israel) Vlada Ekshibarova	2–6, 6–2, 6–1
Loss	14.	16 December 2017	Internazionali di Cordenons, Italy	Clay (i)	(Italy) Anastasia Grymalska	2–6, 0–6
Loss	15.	1 April 2018	ITF Heraklion, Greece	Clay	(Czech Republic) Monika Kilnarová	3–6, 3–6
Win	17.	30 June 2018	ITF Tarvisio, Italy	Clay	(Brazil) Thaisa Grana Pedretti	6–3, 6–3

=== Doubles: 65 (34 titles, 31 runner-ups) ===
Result	No.	Date	Tournament	Surface	Partnering	Opponents	Score
Loss	1.	14 October 2005	Lagos Open, Nigeria	Hard	(Slovenia) Maša Zec Peškirič	(South Africa) Surina De Beer (Spain) Gabriela Velasco Andreu	4–6, 2–6
Loss	2.	26 August 2006	ITF Trecastagni, Italy	Hard	(Italy) Alice Balducci	(France) Kildine Chevalier (Italy) Giulia Meruzzi	6–4, 3–6, 3–6
Loss	3.	14 October 2006	Lagos Open, Nigeria	Hard	(Thailand) Montinee Tangphong	(Romania) Magda Mihalache (Germany) Laura Siegemund	3–6, 3–6
Loss	4.	4 March 2007	ITF Buchen, Germany	Carpet (i)	(Austria) Eva-Maria Hoch	(Czech Republic) Nikola Fraňková (Poland) Magdalena Kiszczyńska	0–0 ret.
Loss	5.	9 March 2007	ITF Quartu Sant'Elena, Italy	Hard	(Germany) Andrea Sieveke	(Italy) Anna Floris (Italy) Valentina Sulpizio	6–7^{(2)}, 6–7^{(4)}
Loss	6.	26 March 2007	ITF Foggia, Italy	Clay	(Austria) Stefanie Haidner	(Italy) Stefania Chieppa (Italy) Giulia Gatto-Monticone	1–6, 3–6
Win	1.	23 April 2007	ITF Naples, Italy	Clay	(Italy) Benedetta Davato	(India) Sandhya Nagaraj (Spain) Sheila Solsona Carcasona	6–1, 6–3
Win	2.	18 May 2007	ITF Caserta, Italy	Clay	(Germany) Andrea Sieveke	(Ukraine) Irina Buryachok (Russia) Varvara Galanina	7–6^{(4)}, 6–2
Loss	7.	6 July 2007	ITF Cremona, Italy	Clay	(Italy) Giulia Gatto-Monticone	(Italy) Benedetta Davato (Italy) Elena Pioppo	3–6, 2–6
Win	3.	12 July 2007	ITF Imola, Italy	Clay	(Italy) Alice Balducci	(Italy) Nicole Clerico (France) Nadege Vergos	6–1, 6–4
Loss	8.	25 August 2007	ITF Trecastagni, Italy	Hard	(Italy) Nicole Clerico	(Italy) Valentina Sassi (Italy) Valentina Sulpizio	6–4, 4–6, 5–7
Win	4.	8 February 2008	ITF Mallorca, Spain	Clay	(Italy) Valentina Sulpizio	(Spain) Leticia Costas (Spain) Maite Gabarrús-Alonso	6–3, 7–6
Win	5.	7 April 2008	ITF Foggia, Italy	Clay	(Italy) Benedetta Davato	(Romania) Laura Ioana Andrei (Chinese Taipei) Chen Yi	6–3, 7–6
Win	6.	28 April 2008	ITF Brescia, Italy	Clay	(Italy) Elena Pioppo	(Italy) Elisa Belleri (Italy) Agnese Zucchini	3–3 ret.
Win	7.	5 May 2008	ITF Vic, Spain	Clay	(Italy) Benedetta Davato	(Morocco) Fatima El Allami (Armenia) Anna Movsisyan	6–2, 6–2
Win	8.	12 May 2008	ITF Badalona, Spain	Clay	(Italy) Benedetta Davato	(United Kingdom) Amanda Carreras (Spain) Maite Gabarrús-Alonso	2–6, 6–2, [10–8]
Win	9.	19 May 2008	ITF Gorizia, Italy	Clay	(Croatia) Darija Jurak	(Slovenia) Maja Kambič (Slovenia) Anja Prislan	6–0, 6–1
Loss	9.	9 June 2008	ITF Lenzerheide, Switzerland	Clay	(Italy) Alice Balducci	(Netherlands) Michelle Gerards (Netherlands) Marlot Meddens	0–6, 3–6
Loss	10.	30 June 2008	ITF Cremona, Italy	Clay	(Italy) Benedetta Davato	(Russia) Nadejda Guskova (Russia) Elena Kulikova	4–6, 1–6
Win	10.	14 July 2008	ITF Casablanca, Morocco	Clay	(Italy) Benedetta Davato	(Spain) Melissa Cabrera-Handt (Portugal) Catarina Ferreira	6–3, 6–4
Win	11.	21 July 2008	ITF Rabat, Morocco	Clay	(Italy) Benedetta Davato	(Russia) Valeria Savinykh (Ukraine) Yuliana Umanets	6–2, 6–1
Win	12.	28 July 2008	ITF Rabat, Morocco	Clay	(Morocco) Fatima El Allami	(Georgia (country)) Sofia Kvatsabaia (Russia) Avgusta Tsybysheva	6–0, 6–3
Win	13.	11 August 2008	ITF Pesaro, Italy	Clay	(Italy) Benedetta Davato	(Italy) Stefania Chieppa (Italy) Giulia Gatto-Monticone	6–2, 7–6
Win	14.	7 September 2008	Martina Franca, Italy	Clay	(Italy) Elena Pioppo	(Italy) Anna Floris (Italy) Valentina Sulpizio	3–6, 6–4, [10–7]
Loss	11.	14 September 2008	ITF Ciampino, Italy	Clay	(Italy) Stefania Chieppa	(Italy) Claudia Giovine (Russia) Regina Kulikova	4–6, 6–4, [7–10]
Loss	12.	17 October 2008	Lagos Open, Nigeria	Hard	(Belgium) Tamaryn Hendler	(South Africa) Surina De Beer (Romania) Ágnes Szatmári	6–7, 3–6
Loss	13.	2 May 2009	Internazionali di Brescia, Italy	Clay	(Italy) Elena Pioppo	(Ukraine) Irina Buryachok (Netherlands) Marlot Meddens	4–6, 6–2, [12–14]
Loss	14.	26 June 2009	ITF Davos, Switzerland	Clay	(Netherlands) Marcella Koek	(Switzerland) Xenia Knoll (Switzerland) Amra Sadiković	5–7, 1–6
Win	15.	4 July 2009	ITF Cremona, Italy	Clay	(Italy) Benedetta Davato	(Australia) Alenka Hubacek (Australia) Tammi Patterson	7–5, 6–3
Win	16.	10 July 2009	ITF Imola, Italy	Clay	(Italy) Benedetta Davato	(Bulgaria) Martina Gledacheva (Italy) Anastasia Grymalska	4–6, 6–2, [10–6]
Loss	15.	17 July 2009	ITF Casablanca, Morocco	Clay	(Italy) Benedetta Davato	(Russia) Galina Fokina (Russia) Anna Morgina	6–7^{(5)}, 6–0, [6–10]
Win	17.	24 July 2009	ITF Casablanca, Morocco	Clay	(Italy) Benedetta Davato	(Spain) Irene Santos-Bravo (Spain) Sheila Solsona Carcasona	6–1, 6–2
Win	18.	30 July 2009	ITF Rabat, Morocco	Clay	(Morocco) Fatima El Allami	(Austria) Natasha Bredl (Austria) Stephanie Hirsch	7–5, 6–1
Loss	16.	22 August 2009	ITF Wahlstedt, Germany	Clay	(Italy) Vivienne Vierin	(Croatia) Darija Jurak (Serbia) Neda Kozić	2–6, 4–6
Loss	17.	13 February 2010	ITF Vale do Lobo, Portugal	Hard	(Bosnia and Herzegovina) Sandra Martinović	(Italy) Julia Mayr (Italy) Evelyn Mayr	2–6, 1–6
Win	19.	6 June 2010	ITF Galatina, Italy	Clay	(Bulgaria) Martina Gledacheva	(Italy) Alice Balducci (Italy) Francesca Palmigiano	6–4, 6–1
Win	20.	3 July 2010	ITF Cremona, Italy	Clay	(Romania) Andreea Vaideanu	(Italy) Stefania Fadabini (Italy) Alice Moroni	6–4, 7–5
Win	21.	20 August 2010	Internazionali di Todi, Italy	Clay	(Italy) Maria Letizia Zavagli	(Italy) Alice Balducci (Italy) Federica Grazioso	0–6, 7–6^{(4)}, [10–8]
Win	22.	8 April 2011	ITF Pomezia, Italy	Clay	(Italy) Benedetta Davato	(Italy) Claudia Giovine (Italy) Valentina Sulpizio	6–7^{(5)}, 6–4, [10–8]
Win	23.	11 June 2011	ITF Madrid, Spain	Clay	(Italy) Andreea Văideanu	(Switzerland) Xenia Knoll (Italy) Benedetta Davato	6–4, 6–1
Loss	18.	18 June 2011	ITF Madrid, Spain	Clay	(Italy) Andreea Văideanu	(Spain) Rocio de la Torre-Sanchez (Spain) Olga Sáez Larra	6–7^{(2)}, 4–6
Loss	19.	16 June 2012	ITF Padova, Italy	Clay	(Italy) Federica Grazioso	(Italy) Gioia Barbieri (Italy) Anastasia Grymalska	2–6, 1–6
Loss	20.	22 September 2012	ITF Dobrich, Bulgaria	Clay	(Germany) Anne Schäfer	(Poland) Katarzyna Piter (Poland) Barbara Sobaszkiewicz	2–6, 5–7
Loss	21.	10 May 2013	ITF Pula, Italy	Clay	(Italy) Annalisa Bona	(Italy) Martina Caregaro (Italy) Anna Floris	2–6, 3–6
Loss	22.	27 July 2013	ITF Rimini, Italy	Clay	(Italy) Giulia Gasparri	(United States) Kaitlyn Christian (United States) Sabrina Santamaria	2–6, 1–6
Loss	23.	12 September 2013	ITF Mytilini, Greece	Hard	(United Kingdom) Laura Deigman	(United States) Ashley Murdock (United States) Eva Raszkiewicz	6–1, 2–6, [7–10]
Loss	24.	5 October 2013	ITF Athens, Greece	Hard	(Germany) Franziska Koenig	(Russia) Aminat Kushkhova (Russia) Polina Leykina	5–7, 3–6
Win	24.	17 May 2014	ITF Sharm El Sheikh, Egypt	Hard	(Serbia) Nina Stojanović	(United Kingdom) Lucy Brown (Russia) Polina Leykina	6–3, 4–6, [10–3]
Win	25.	27 June 2014	ITF Rome, Italy	Clay	(Italy) Alice Savoretti	(Germany) Luisa Marie Huber (Germany) Julia Wachaczyk	6–7, 7–5, [10–5]
Loss	25.	11 July 2014	ITF Turin, Italy	Clay	(Italy) Georgia Brescia	(Colombia) Yuliana Lizarazo (Italy) Alice Matteucci	3–6, 2–6
Loss	26.	18 July 2014	ITF Imola, Italy	Carpet	(Italy) Anna Remondina	(United Kingdom) Katie Boulter (United Kingdom) Katy Dunne	6–7, 3–6
Loss	27.	2 August 2014	ITF Rovereto, Italy	Clay	(Italy) Alice Savoretti	(Germany) Luisa Marie Huber (Poland) Natalia Siedliska	4–6, 1–6
Loss	28.	29 August 2014	ITF Caslano, Switzerland	Clay	(Italy) Angelica Moratelli	(Australia) Alexandra Nancarrow (Netherlands) Eva Wacanno	0–6, 3–6
Win	26.	11 October 2014	ITF Pula, Italy	Clay	(Germany) Anne Schäfer	(Germany) Anna Klasen (Germany) Charlotte Klasen	6–4, 5–7, [10–6]
Win	27.	2 November 2014	ITF Pula, Italy	Clay	(Italy) Georgia Brescia	(France) Camille Cheli (Italy) Marcella Cucca	6–4, 6–3
Loss	29.	9 November 2014	ITF Pula, Italy	Clay	(Germany) Anne Schäfer	(Italy) Georgia Brescia (Italy) Martina Caregaro	6–3, 4–6, [6–10]
Loss	30.	21 November 2014	ITF Casablanca, Morocco	Clay	(United Kingdom) Manisha Foster	(Spain) Georgina García Pérez (Spain) Olga Parres Azcoitia	6–1, 6–7^{(2)}, [7–10]
Win	28.	27 March 2015	ITF Solarino, Italy	Hard	(Italy) Francesca Palmigiano	(Hungary) Anna Bondár (Russia) Olga Doroshina	6–3, 4–6, [10–3]
Win	29.	15 July 2016	ITF Imola, Italy	Carpet	(Greece) Eleni Daniilidou	(Italy) Martina Di Giuseppe (Italy) Maria Masini	4–6, 6–2, [10–4]
Win	30.	30 June 2017	ITF Tarvisio, Italy	Clay	(Italy) Federica Di Sarra	(Argentina) Carla Lucero (Hungary) Szabina Szlavikovics	6–0, 6–3
Win	31.	28 July 2017	ITF Schio, Italy	Clay	(Italy) Federica Di Sarra	(Italy) Anastasia Grymalska (Italy) Maria Masini	6–0, 6–1
Win	32.	25 August 2017	ITF Caslano, Switzerland	Clay	(Switzerland) Susan Bandecchi	(Italy) Chiara Giaquinta (Italy) Maria Aurelia Scotti	6–1, 6–2
Win	33.	6 October 2017	ITF Telde, Spain	Clay	(Netherlands) Chayenne Ewijk	(Peru) Anastasia Iamachkine (Spain) Ana Lantigua de la Nuez	6–1, 6–1
Win	34.	23 June 2019	ITF Klosters, Switzerland	Clay	(Italy) Gaia Sanesi	(Switzerland) Leonie Küng (Bulgaria) Isabella Shinikova	3–6, 6–1, [10–6]
Loss	31.	11 August 2019	Internazionali di Cordenons, Italy	Clay	(Italy) Martina Caregaro	(Slovenia) Veronika Erjavec (Slovenia) Nika Radišič	3–6, 5–7
