= Martina Gledacheva =

Bulgarian tennis player

Martina Gledacheva Мартина Гледачева
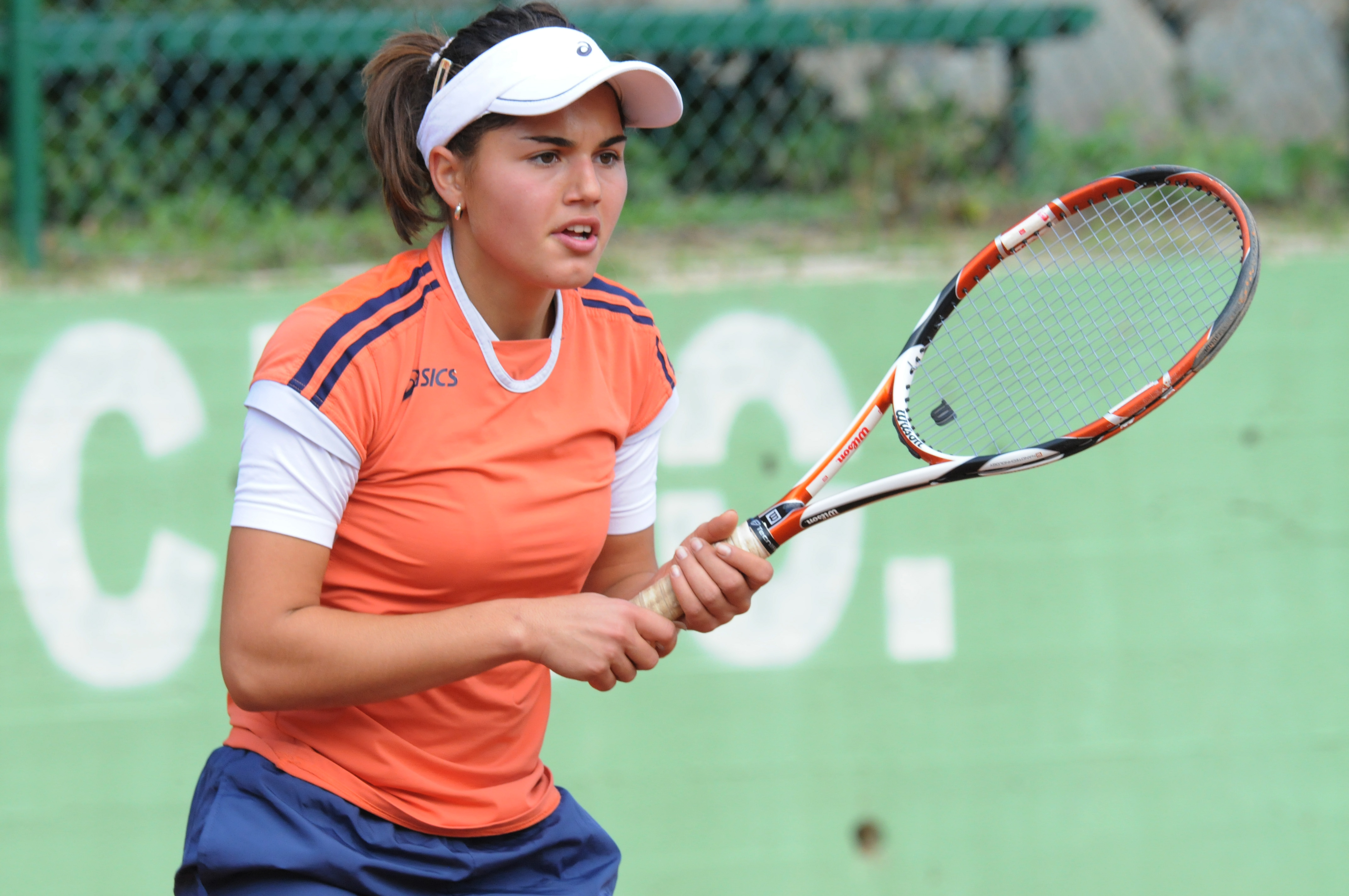
- Gledacheva in Rome, 2008
- Full name: Martina Svetozarova Gledacheva
- Country (sports): Bulgaria
- Residence: Rome, Italy
- Born: 12 March 1991 (age 35) Plovdiv, Bulgaria
- Turned pro: 2008
- Plays: Right-handed
- Prize money: $30,193

Singles
- Career record: 107–91
- Highest ranking: No. 399 (12 September 2011)

Doubles
- Career record: 40–52
- Career titles: 2 ITF
- Highest ranking: No. 502 (9 May 2011)

Martina Svetozarova Gledacheva (Bulgarian: Мартина Светозарова Гледачева; born 12 March 1991) is a former tennis player from Bulgaria.

In 2006, she was ranked fifth in the European Tennis Association under-16 rankings. In the same year, she became the Bulgarian national champion for girls under 18, winning four singles and five doubles titles in international tournaments under the age of 16. For these successes, she was named the most progressive tennis player by the Bulgarian Tennis Federation.

Gledacheva was a part of the Bulgarian National Team U14, U16 and U18, and took part in Federation Cup for Bulgaria. She was a national champion U16 and U18, and was ranked No. 2 in Europe U16.

In September 2011, she reached her career-high singles ranking of world No. 399. In May 2011, she peaked at No. 502 in the doubles rankings. In May 2012, Gledacheva played her last match on the ITF Women's Circuit in Florence, Italy.

She then attended Lynn University in Boca Raton, Florida, where she competed in Division 2. During her collegiate tennis career at Lynn University, Gledacheva excelled in both singles and doubles play. As a junior, she achieved a 17–3 singles record and went undefeated at No. 4 singles, while also earning SSC Commissioner Honor Roll and ITA Scholar-Athlete honors.

In her sophomore year, she was named to the All-SSC Second Team in singles, posted a 22–4 doubles record, and went on a 20-match unbeaten streak. As a freshman, she recorded a 19–4 singles record and played a pivotal role in Lynn's NCAA National Championship return. Throughout her career, she earned multiple academic and athletic accolades, including SSC Commissioner Honor Roll recognition each year. Gledacheva ultimately graduated with a BSc in International Finance and an MBA before returning to Bulgaria.

In 2020, she married Joseph Harari. In 2024, she graduated as a certified tennis coach by the Bulgarian Tennis Federation.

As of 2025, Gledacheva lives in Plovdiv, Bulgaria, and works as a tennis coach.

== ITF Circuit finals ==
=== Singles: 6 (6 runner-ups) ===
Legend $10,000 tournaments	Finals by surface Clay (0–6)

Result	W–L	Date	Tournament	Tier	Surface	Opponent	Score
Loss	0–1	May 2009	ITF Caserta, Italy	10,000	Clay	(Italy) Martina di Giuseppe	6–7^{(7–9)}, 1–6
Loss	0–2	Sep 2009	ITF Ruse, Bulgaria	10,000	Clay	(Romania) Simona Matei	2–6, 3–6
Loss	0–3	Aug 2010	Palić Open, Serbia	10,000	Clay	(Slovakia) Zuzana Zlochová	1–6, ret.
Loss	0–4	Oct 2010	ITF Bol, Croatia	10,000	Clay	(Croatia) Dijana Banoveć	0–6, 0–6
Loss	0–5	Aug 2011	ITF Rebecq, Belgium	10,000	Clay	(France) Constance Sibille	3–6, 1–6
Loss	0–6	Aug 2011	ITF Charleroi, Belgium	10,000	Clay	(Kyrgyzstan) Bermet Duvanaeva	6–2, 5–7, 1–6

=== Doubles: 7 (2 titles, 5 runner-ups) ===
Legend $25,000 tournaments $10,000 tournaments	Finals by surface Clay (2–4) Carpet (0–1)

Result	W–L	Date	Tournament	Tier	Surface	Partner	Opponents	Score
Loss	0–1	Jul 2009	ITF Imola, Italy	10,000	Carpet	(Italy) Anastasia Grymalska	(Italy) Benedetta Davato (Switzerland) Lisa Sabino	6–4, 2–6, [6–10]
Win	1–1	Jun 2010	ITF Galatina, Italy	10,000	Clay	(Switzerland) Lisa Sabino	(Italy) Alice Balducci (Italy) Francesca Palmigiano	6–4, 6–1
Loss	1–2	Aug 2010	Palić Open, Serbia	10,000	Clay	(Italy) Francesca Mazzali	(Bosnia and Herzegovina) Jasmina Kajtazovič (Slovakia) Zuzana Zlochová	1–6, 6–4, [7–10]
Loss	1–3	Sep 2010	ITF Balş, Romania	10,000	Clay	(Italy) Valentina Sulpizio	(Romania) Alexandra Cadanțu (Romania) Alexandra Damaschin	3–6, 5–7
Loss	1–4	Oct 2010	ITF Ciampino, Italy	10,000	Clay	(Italy) Stefania Chieppa	(Italy) Valentina Sulpizio (Romania) Diana Enache	4–6, 4–6
Loss	1–5	Mar 2011	ITF Antalya, Turkey	10,000	Clay	(Bulgaria) Isabella Shinikova	(Belarus) Ilona Kremen (Netherlands) Demi Schuurs	6–3, 6–7^{(3)}, [8–10]
Win	2–5	May 2011	ITF San Severo, Italy	10,000	Clay	(Italy) Valentina Sulpizio	(Italy) Adriana Lavoretti (Switzerland) Mirjam Zeller	6–2, 6–1
