= Stefania Chieppa =

Italian tennis player

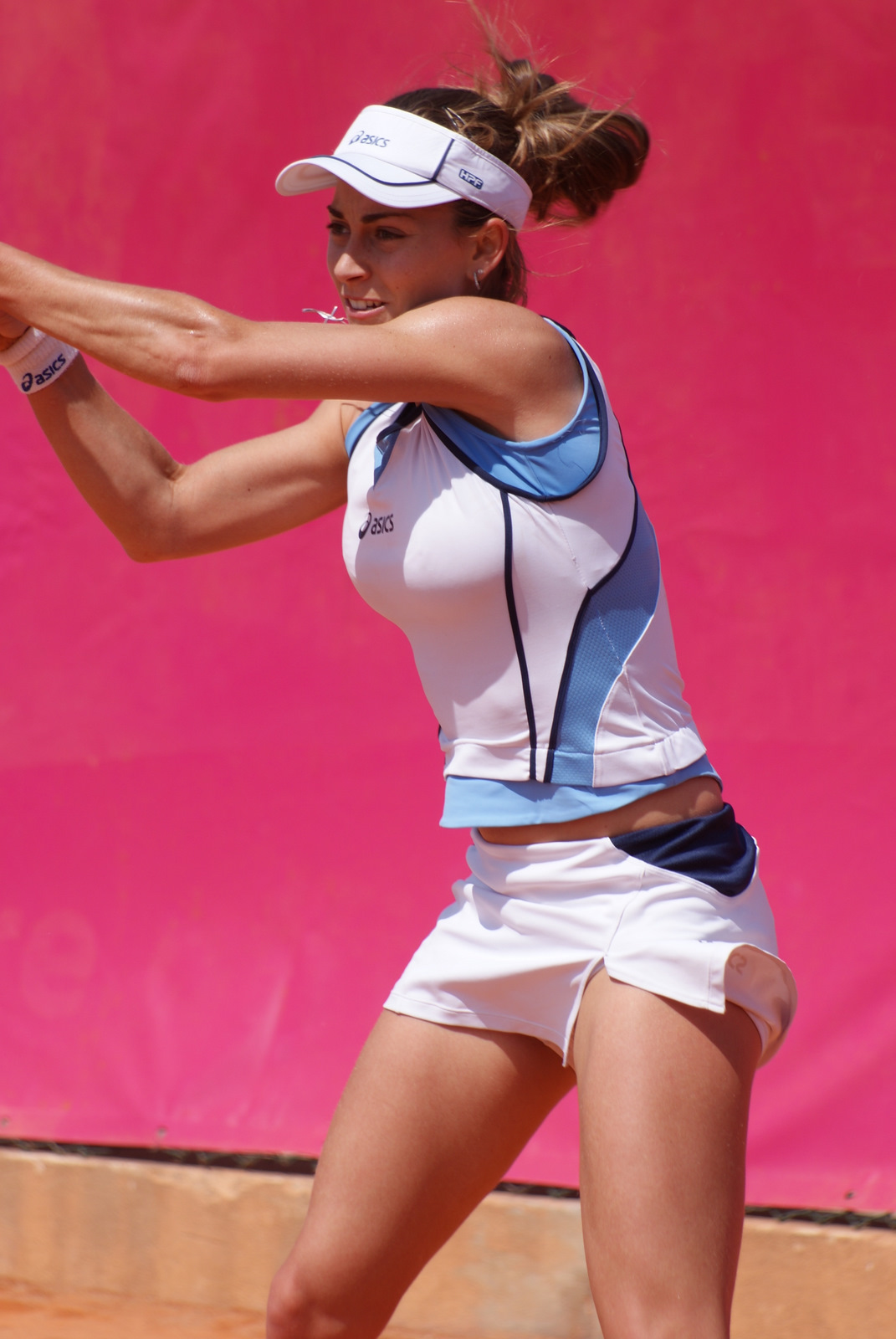
- Chieppa at Cagnes-sur-Mer, 2009
- Country (sports): Italy
- Born: 5 April 1983 (age 42); Turin, Italy
- Turned pro: 1999
- Plays: Right (two-handed backhand)
- Prize money: $86,371

Singles
- Career record: 228–256
- Career titles: 2 ITF
- Highest ranking: No. 359 (10 July 2006)

Doubles
- Career record: 147–144
- Career titles: 15 ITF
- Highest ranking: No. 204 (9 July 2007)

Stefania Chieppa (Italian pronunciation: [steˈfaːnja ˈkjɛppa, - ˈkje-]; born 5 April 1983) is an Italian former tennis player.

She achieved a career-high singles ranking of world No. 359 on 10 July 2006. She reached her peak in doubles at No. 204 on 9 July 2007. Throughout her career, Chieppa won two singles titles and 15 doubles titles on the ITF Women's Circuit.

She played her last match on the circuit in July 2016.

== ITF Circuit finals ==
$50,000 tournaments
$25,000 tournaments
$10,000 tournaments

=== Singles: 10 (2 titles, 8 runner-ups) ===
Result	No.	Date	Tournament	Surface	Opponent	Score
Loss	1.	Nov 2004	ITF Rome, Italy	Clay	(Czech Republic) Sandra Záhlavová	7–5, 2–6, 3–6
Win	1.	Jul 2005	ITF Getxo, Spain	Clay	(Portugal) Magali de Lattre	6–1, 6–3
Loss	2.	Jul 2005	ITF Zwevegem, Belgium	Clay	(Czech Republic) Petra Cetkovská	4–6, 2–6
Loss	3.	Mar 2006	ITF Rome, Italy	Clay	(Croatia) Darija Jurak	6–3, 1–6, 6–7^{(5)}
Loss	4.	May 2006	ITF Casale Monferrato, Italy	Clay	(Russia) Anastasia Pavlyuchenkova	6–3, 3–6, 4–6
Loss	5.	Oct 2006	ITF Castel Gandolfo, Italy	Clay	(Argentina) María Belén Corbalán	3–6, 6–4, 4–6
Win	2.	Oct 2006	ITF Settimo San Pietro, Italy	Clay	(Italy) Corinna Dentoni	6–2, 6–3
Loss	6.	May 2008	ITF Gorizia, Italy	Clay	(Switzerland) Lisa Sabino	1–6, 0–6
Loss	7.	Oct 2009	ITF Settimo San Pietro, Italy	Clay	(Italy) Elisa Balsamo	4–6, 1–6
Loss	8.	Sep 2011	ITF Sanremo, Italy	Clay	(Italy) Carolina Pillot	3–6, 3–6

=== Doubles: 36 (15–21) ===
Result	No.	Date	Tournament	Surface	Partner	Opponents	Score
Loss	1.	27 September 1998	ITF Lecce, Italy	Clay	(Italy) Giulia Casoni	(Italy) Katia Altilia (Austria) Stefanie Haidner	0–6, 2–6
Loss	2.	9 September 2002	ITF Cuneo, Italy	Clay	(Israel) Yevgenia Savransky	(France) Aurélie Védy (France) Karla Mraz	6–2, 3–6, 2–6
Loss	3.	20 October 2002	ITF Benevento, Italy	Hard	(Italy) Emily Stellato	(Poland) Alicja Rosolska (Italy) Alexia Virgili	4–6, 4–6
Loss	4.	16 May 2004	ITF Casale Monferrato, Italy	Clay	(Slovakia) Martina Babáková	(Russia) Irina Smirnova (Italy) Valentina Sulpizio	3–6, 6–3, 3–6
Win	1.	22 August 2004	ITF Jesi, Italy	Clay	(Italy) Valentina Sulpizio	(Brazil) Larissa Carvalho (Italy) Elena Vianello	6–3, 7–5
Win	2.	24 October 2004	ITF Settimo San Pietro, Italy	Clay	(France) Sylvia Montero	(Italy) Raffaella Bindi (Czech Republic) Sandra Záhlavová	7–6^{(5)}, 3–6, 6–2
Win	3.	7 November 2004	ITF Rome, Italy	Clay	(Italy) Nicole Clerico	(Italy) Valentina Sulpizi (Czech Republic) Sandra Záhlavová	3–6, 6–4, 6–2
Loss	5.	20 March 2005	ITF Rome, Italy	Clay	(Italy) Raffaella Bindi	(Italy) Valentina Sulpizio (Czech Republic) Sandra Záhlavová	5–7, 4–6
Loss	6.	18 April 2005	ITF Bari, Italy	Clay	(Switzerland) Romina Oprandi	(Bosnia and Herzegovina) Mervana Jugić-Salkić (Austria) Stefanie Haidner	3–6, 6–7^{(3)}
Loss	7.	16 October 2005	ITF Castel Gandolfo, Italy	Clay	(Italy) Nicole Clerico	(Belarus) Alena Bayarchyk (Russia) Alexandra Karavaeva	2–6, 2–6
Loss	8.	25 March 2006	ITF Parioli, Italy	Clay	(Italy) Valentina Sulpizio	(Poland) Magdalena Kiszczyńska (Romania) Simona Matei	2–6, 3–6
Win	4.	21 October 2006	ITF Settimo San Pietro, Italy	Clay	(Italy) Lisa Tognetti	(Italy) Alice Balducci (Italy) Elisa Salis	6–2, 0–6, 6–0
Win	5.	11 November 2006	ITF Mallorca, Spain	Clay	(Argentina) María Belén Corbalán	(Slovenia) Anja Prislan (Slovenia) Tina Obrež	6–4, 6–7^{(3)}, 6–0
Win	6.	18 February 2007	ITF Mallorca, Spain	Clay	(Italy) Valentina Sulpizio	(Brazil) Fernanda Hermenegildo (Brazil) Fabiana Mak	5–7, 6–3, 6–4
Win	7.	30 March 2007	ITF Foggia, Italy	Clay	(Italy) Giulia Gatto-Monticone	(Switzerland) Lisa Sabino (Austria) Stefanie Haidner	6–1, 6–3
Win	8.	27 May 2007	ITF Gorizia, Italy	Clay	(Italy) Giulia Gabba	(Italy) Denise Mascherini (Slovenia) Anja Prislan	6–3, 6–0
Loss	9.	2 June 2007	ITF Galatina, Italy	Clay	(Belarus) Darya Kustova	(Czech Republic) Eva Hrdinová (Canada) Marie-Ève Pelletier	1–6, 6–7^{(4)}
Win	9.	8 June 2007	Grado Tennis Cup, Italy	Clay	(Belarus) Darya Kustova	(Montenegro) Ana Veselinović (Australia) Christina Wheeler	7–5, 6–3
Loss	10.	10 September 2007	ITF Casale Monferrato, Italy	Clay	(Italy) Giulia Gatto-Monticone	(France) Émilie Bacquet (France) Samantha Schoeffel	2–6, 2–6
Win	10.	5 October 2007	ITF Castel Gandolfo, Italy	Clay	(Italy) Giulia Gatto-Monticone	(Austria) Stefanie Haidner (Switzerland) Amra Sadiković	2–3 ret.
Loss	11.	19 October 2007	ITF Settimo San Pietro, Italy	Clay	(Italy) Valentina Sassi	(Italy) Anna Floris (Italy) Valentina Sulpizio	1–6, 4–6
Loss	12.	16 March 2008	ITF Rome, Italy	Clay	(Italy) Valentina Sulpizio	(Romania) Ioana Ivan (Belarus) Ksenia Milevskaya	3–6, 6–7^{(5)}
Loss	13.	5 April 2008	ITF Civitavecchia, Italy	Clay	(Belarus) Darya Kustova	(Argentina) Jorgelina Cravero (Argentina) Betina Jozami	6–4, 3–6, [6–10]
Loss	14.	21 June 2008	ITF Turin, Italy	Clay	(Italy) Giulia Gatto-Monticone	(Belarus) Tatsiana Kapshai (Russia) Alexandra Razumova	7–6^{(4)}, 2–6, [8–10]
Win	11.	2 August 2008	ITF Gardone Val Trompia, Italy	Clay	(Argentina) María Belén Corbalán	(Canada) Elisabeth Abanda (Canada) Emma Onila	6–3, 6–2
Loss	15.	15 August 2008	ITF Pesaro, Italy	Clay	(Italy) Giulia Gatto-Monticone	(Italy) Benedetta Davato (Switzerland) Lisa Sabino	2–6, 6–7^{(5)}
Loss	16.	13 September 2008	ITF Ciampino, Italy	Clay	(Switzerland) Lisa Sabino	(Italy) Claudia Giovine (Russia) Regina Kulikova	4–6, 6–4, [7–10]
Loss	17.	27 September 2008	ITF Lecce, Italy	Clay	(Italy) Giulia Gabba	(Slovakia) Michaela Pochabová (Slovakia) Klaudia Boczová	4–6, 1–6
Win	12.	16 May 2009	ITF Caserta, Italy	Clay	(Italy) Giulia Gatto-Monticone	(Italy) Martina Di Giuseppe (Romania) Andreea Văideanu	6–1, 6–4
Loss	18.	17 July 2009	ITF Rome, Italy	Clay	(Italy) Elisa Balsamo	(Argentina) María Irigoyen (Serbia) Teodora Mirčić	5–7, 2–6
Win	13.	1 August 2009	ITF Gardone Val Trompia, Italy	Clay	(Italy) Claudia Giovine	(Italy) Stefania Fadabini (Italy) Anna Remondina	4–6, 6–2, [12–10]
Loss	19.	29 August 2009	ITF Arezzo, Italy	Clay	(Italy) Valentina Sulpizio	(Italy) Giulia Gatto-Monticone (Italy) Federica Quercia	3–6, 6–4, [2–10]
Loss	20.	4 October 2009	ITF Ciampino, Italy	Clay	(Italy) Valentina Sulpizio	(Bosnia and Herzegovina) Sandra Martinović (Russia) Marina Shamayko	6–7^{(4)}, 4–6
Win	14.	26 March 2010	ITF Pomezia, Italy	Clay	(Romania) Liana Ungur	(Italy) Andreea Văideanu (Italy) Erika Zanchetta	7–6^{(3)}, 4–6, [10–7]
Win	15.	22 May 2010	ITF Rivoli, Italy	Clay	(Italy) Valentina Sulpizio	(Italy) Stefania Fadabini (Italy) Alice Moroni	7–6^{(1)}, 6–1
Loss	21.	2 October 2010	ITF Ciampino, Italy	Clay	(Bulgaria) Martina Gledacheva	(Italy) Valentina Sulpizio (Romania) Diana Enache	4–6, 4–6
