= Nicole Rottmann =

Austrian tennis player (born 1989)

- Country (sports): Austria
- Born: 28 June 1989 (age 36) Wagna
- Prize money: US$ 88,718

Singles
- Career record: 205–223
- Career titles: 2 ITF
- Highest ranking: No. 307 (23 July 2012)

Doubles
- Career record: 131–118
- Career titles: 13 ITF
- Highest ranking: No. 185 (29 October 2012)

Team competitions
- Fed Cup: 2–1

Nicole Rottmann (German pronunciation: [ˈʁɔtman]; born 28 June 1989) is an Austrian former professional tennis player.

She won two singles titles and 13 doubles titles on the ITF Circuit. On 23 July 2012, she reached her best singles ranking of world No. 307. On 29 October 2012, she peaked at No. 185 in the WTA doubles rankings.

Rottmann has a 2–1 win–loss record playing for Austria Fed Cup team.

== ITF finals ==
=== Singles: 6 (2–4) ===
Legend $100,000 tournaments $75,000 tournaments $50,000 tournaments $25,000 tournaments $10,000 tournaments	Finals by surface Hard (1–2) Clay (1–2)

Result	No.	Date	Tournament	Surface	Opponent	Score
Loss	1.	22 June 2007	ITF Annaba, Algeria	Clay	(Italy) Lisa Sabino	3–6, 3–6
Win	1.	30 September 2007	ITF Thessaloniki, Greece	Clay	(Italy) Alice Moroni	6–4, 6–0
Loss	2.	15 May 2011	ITF Heraklion, Greece	Hard	(Greece) Despina Papamichail	1–6, 6–3, 2–6
Win	2.	28 May 2011	ITF Durban, South Africa	Hard	(Czech Republic) Kateřina Kramperová	6–7^{(4)}, 7–5, 6–1
Loss	3.	17 March 2013	ITF Metepec, Mexico	Hard	(Mexico) Marcela Zacarías	1–6, 1–6
Loss	4.	21 August 2016	ITF Graz, Austria	Clay	(Czech Republic) Kateřina Vaňková	1–6, 2–6

=== Doubles: 21 (13–8) ===
Legend $100,000 tournaments $75,000 tournaments $50,000 tournaments $25,000 tournaments $10,000 tournaments	Finals by surface Hard (9–6) Clay (4–2)

Result	No.	Date	Tournament	Surface	Partner	Opponents	Score
Loss	1.	22 September 2007	ITF Bratislava, Slovakia	Clay	(Austria) Stefanie Haidner	(Slovakia) Monika Kochanová (Slovakia) Klaudia Malenovská	5–7, 6–7^{(4)}
Loss	2.	15 December 2007	ITF Havana, Cuba	Hard	(Austria) Lisa-Maria Moser	(Mexico) Daniela Múñoz Gallegos (Mexico) Valeria Pulido	3–6, 4–6
Loss	3.	17 May 2008	ITF Raleigh, United States	Clay	(Switzerland) Stefania Boffa	(Georgia (country)) Anna Tatishvili (United States) Kimberly Couts	3–6, 4–6
Win	1.	8 November 2008	El Menzah, Tunisia	Hard	(Austria) Franziska Klotz	(Ukraine) Anna Larkina (Serbia) Aleksandra Tucakow	6–3, 6–4
Win	2.	10 October 2009	Troy, United States	Hard	(Slovenia) Petra Rampre	(Argentina) Jorgelina Cravero (Romania) Edina Gallovits-Hall	6–3, 3–6, [10–8]
Win	3.	28 May 2010	Durban, South Africa	Hard	(Hungary) Blanka Szávay	(India) Sanaa Bhambri (India) Rushmi Chakravarthi	3–6, 7–5, [11–9]
Win	4.	28 August 2010	San Luis Potosí, Mexico	Hard	(United States) Macall Harkins	(Argentina) Andrea Benítez (United States) Nadia Echeverría Alam	6–1, 6–4
Win	5.	18 September 2010	Caracas, Venezuela	Hard	(Belgium) Gally De Wael	(Venezuela) Andrea Gámiz (Venezuela) Adriana Pérez	6–2, 1–6, [10–4]
Win	6.	25 September 2010	Caracas, Venezuela	Hard	(Belgium) Gally De Wael	(Argentina) Mikele Irazusta (Colombia) María Paula Ribero	6–0, 6–1
Loss	4.	12 March 2011	Irapuato, Mexico	Hard	(United States) Macall Harkins	(Hungary) Tímea Babos (United Kingdom) Johanna Konta	3–6, 4–6
Win	7.	26 March 2011	Poza Rica, Mexico	Hard	(United States) Macall Harkins	(Brazil) Fernanda Hermenegildo (Brazil) Teliana Pereira	6–2, 6–4
Loss	5.	29 April 2011	Minsk, Belarus	Hard (i)	(Serbia) Teodora Mirčić	(Ukraine) Lyudmyla Kichenok (Ukraine) Nadiia Kichenok	1–6, 2–6
Loss	6.	14 May 2011	Heraklion, Greece	Hard	(United Kingdom) Amanda Elliott	(United Kingdom) Anna Fitzpatrick (United Kingdom) Samantha Murray	3–6, 2–6
Loss	7.	20 May 2011	Durban, South Africa	Hard	(Denmark) Malou Ejdesgaard	(United Kingdom) Jennifer Allan (South Africa) Surina De Beer	2–6, 6–4, [8–10]
Loss	8.	27 May 2011	Durban, South Africa	Hard	(Denmark) Malou Ejdesgaard	(Czech Republic) Kateřina Kramperová (Czech Republic) Zuzana Linhová	3–6, 6–3, [8–10]
Win	8.	5 August 2011	Monteroni, Italy	Clay	(Netherlands) Kiki Bertens	(Italy) Gioia Barbieri (Italy) Anastasia Grymalska	6–0, 6–3
Win	9.	11 May 2012	Rosario, Argentina	Clay	(Brazil) Teliana Pereira	(Paraguay) Verónica Cepede Royg (Argentina) Luciana Sarmenti	6–2, 7–5
Win	10.	28 July 2012	Wrexham, Great Britain	Hard	(Slovakia) Lenka Wienerová	(Japan) Yuka Higuchi (Japan) Hirono Watanabe	6–1, 6–1
Win	11.	5 August 2012	ITF Bad Saulgau, Germany	Clay	(Spain) Rocío de la Torre Sánchez	(Russia) Anastasia Pivovarova (France) Laura Thorpe	7–5, 6–1
Win	12.	16 March 2013	ITF Metepec, Mexico	Hard	(United States) Macall Harkins	(Brazil) Laura Pigossi (Mexico) Marcela Zacarías	6–3, 6–2
Win	13.	12 March 2016	ITF Antalya, Turkey	Clay	(Austria) Yvonne Neuwirth	(Romania) Andreea Ghițescu (Romania) Raluca Șerban	2–6, 6–4, [10–5]
