= Alice Moroni =

Italian tennis player (born 1991)

- Country (sports): Italy
- Born: 21 February 1991 (age 35) Bergamo, Italy
- Plays: Right-handed
- Prize money: $46,163

Singles
- Career record: 153–126
- Career titles: 4 ITF
- Highest ranking: No. 377 (21 September 2009)

Doubles
- Career record: 30–39
- Career titles: 1 ITF
- Highest ranking: No. 575 (4 October 2010)

Alice Moroni (born 21 February 1991) is an Italian former professional tennis player.

A right-handed player from Bergamo in the north of Italy, Moroni reached a best ranking of 377 in the world and won four singles titles and one doubles title on the ITF Circuit.

At the 2009 Italian Open, she made the second round of singles qualifying, and received a wildcard into the doubles main draw, partnering fellow Italian Nastassja Burnett.

== ITF finals ==
=== Singles: 8 (4 titles, 4 runner-ups) ===
Result	No.	Date	Tournament	Surface	Opponent	Score
Loss	1.	30 September 2007	ITF Thessaloniki, Greece	Clay	(Austria) Nicole Rottmann	4–6, 0–6
Win	1.	24 March 2008	ITF Athens, Greece	Hard	(Ukraine) Tetyana Arefyeva	6–3, 6–4
Win	2.	11 August 2008	ITF Pesaro, Italy	Clay	(Italy) Lisa Sabino	6–1, 3–6, 6–3
Loss	2.	18 August 2008	ITF Trecastagni, Italy	Hard	(Canada) Rebecca Marino	2–6, 2–6
Win	3.	5 September 2009	ITF Bassano del Grappa, Italy	Clay	(Italy) Julia Mayr	7–6^{(1)}, 6–1
Loss	3.	25 April 2011	ITF San Severo, Italy	Clay	(France) Olivia Sanchez	2–6, 1–6
Loss	4.	4 July 2011	ITF Torino, Italy	Clay	(Austria) Iris Khanna	6–7^{(4)}, 7–5, 5–7
Win	4.	15 August 2011	ITF Todi, Italy	Clay	(Italy) Alice Balducci	6–1, 4–6, 6–3

=== Doubles: 5 (1 title, 4 runner-ups) ===
Result	No.	Date	Tournament	Surface	Partner	Opponents	Score
Loss	1.	5 October 2009	ITF Foggia, Italy	Clay	(Italy) Anna-Giulia Remondina	(Italy) Gioia Barbieri (Italy) Anastasia Grymalska	4–6, 6–4, [2–10]
Loss	2.	22 May 2010	ITF Rivoli, Italy	Clay	(Italy) Stefania Fadabini	(Italy) Valentina Sulpizio (Italy) Stefania Chieppa	6–7^{(1)}, 1–6
Loss	3.	3 July 2010	ITF Cremona, Italy	Clay	(Italy) Stefania Fadabini	(Romania) Andreea Vaideanu (Switzerland) Lisa Sabino	4–6, 5–7
Loss	4.	23 July 2012	ITF Viserba, Italy	Clay	(Italy) Clelia Melena	(Italy) Maria Masini (Argentina) Catalina Pella	1–6, 2–6
Win	1.	30 July 2012	ITF Gardone Val; Trompia, Italy	Clay	(Moldova) Gabriela Porubin	(Italy) Stefania Fadabini (Italy) Giulia Gasparri	6–1, 6–3
