= Giorgia Marchetti =

Italian tennis player (born 1995)

- Country (sports): Italy
- Born: 21 January 1995 (age 31)
- Plays: Right (two-handed backhand)
- Prize money: $60,442

Singles
- Career record: 136–152
- Career titles: 1 ITF
- Highest ranking: No. 535 (24 July 2017)

Doubles
- Career record: 170–99
- Career titles: 21 ITF
- Highest ranking: No. 143 (27 May 2019)
Medal record
Women's padel
Representing Italy
European Games
Gold medal – first place	2023 Kraków–Małopolska	Doubles

Giorgia Marchetti (born 21 January 1995) is an Italian former tennis player and padel player.

She has career-high WTA rankings of 535 in singles, achieved on 24 July 2017, and 143 in doubles, set on 27 May 2019.

Marchetti made her WTA Tour main-draw debut at the 2019 Ladies Open Lugano in the doubles tournament, partnering Arantxa Rus.

== ITF Circuit finals ==
=== Singles: 2 (1 title, 1 runner-up) ===
Legend $15,000 tournaments $10,000 tournaments	Finals by surface Hard (0–0) Clay (1–1)

Result	W–L	Date	Tournament	Tier	Surface	Opponent	Score
Loss	0–1	Jul 2016	ITF Iași, Romania	10,000	Clay	(Moldova) Alexandra Perper	3–6, 0–6
Win	1–1	Jun 2018	ITF Madrid, Spain	15,000	Clay	(France) Julie Gervais	6–1, 2–6, 6–1
