= 2011 Torneo Internazionale Regione Piemonte – Singles =

Singles
- 2011 Torneo Internazionale Regione Piemonte

Final
- Champion: (Romania) Alexandra Cadanțu
- Runner-up: (Colombia) Mariana Duque
- Score: 6–4, 6–3

Events
Singles	Doubles
← 2010 ·	Torneo Internazionale Regione Piemonte	· 2012 →

Renata Voráčová was the defending champion, but lost in the first round against Tatjana Malek.
Alexandra Cadanțu won the title, defeating Mariana Duque 6–4, 6–3 in the final.

== Seeds ==
1. (Estonia) Kaia Kanepi (semifinals)
2. (Spain) Laura Pous Tió (quarterfinals)
3. (Austria) Patricia Mayr-Achleitner (quarterfinals)
4. (France) Alizé Cornet (second round)
5. (Italy) Maria Elena Camerin (first round)
6. (Czech Republic) Renata Voráčová (first round)
7. (Austria) Yvonne Meusburger (first round)
8. (Italy) Romina Oprandi (first round)

== Main draw ==
=== Key ===
- Q = Qualifier
- WC = Wild card
- LL = Lucky loser
- Alt = Alternate
- SE = Special exempt
- PR = Protected ranking
- ITF = ITF entry
- JE = Junior exempt
- w/o = Walkover
- r = Retired
- d = Defaulted
- SR = Special ranking

=== Finals ===
Semifinals
1/WC	(Estonia) Kaia Kanepi	4	4
Q	(Colombia) Mariana Duque	6	6
Q	(Georgia (country)) Margalita Chakhnashvili	6^{3}	6	3
(Romania) Alexandra Cadanțu	7^{7}	2	6

Final
Q	(Colombia) Mariana Duque	4	3
(Romania) Alexandra Cadanțu	6	6

=== Top half ===
First round
1/WC	(Estonia) K Kanepi	6	6
(Switzerland) S Vögele	2	4
WC	(Italy) S Eccel	6^{1}	0
(Italy) A Floris	7^{7}	6
(Italy) K Knapp	7^{7}	6
(Bulgaria) E Kostova	6^{1}	3
(Slovakia) K Kučová	6	7^{7}
5	(Italy) ME Camerin	3	6^{4}
3	(Austria) P Mayr-Achleitner	3	6	6
(Ukraine) O Savchuk	6	4	4
(Russia) E Ivanova	6	6
WC	(Italy) G Gatto-Monticone	3	2
(Spain) L Costas-Moreira	7	2	6
(Czech Republic) S Záhlavová	5	6	2
Q	(Colombia) M Duque	6	7
8	(Italy) R Oprandi	4	5

Second round
1/WC	(Estonia) K Kanepi	6	6
(Italy) A Floris	3	2
(Italy) K Knapp	6	6
(Slovakia) K Kučová	1	1
3	(Austria) P Mayr-Achleitner	6	6
(Russia) E Ivanova	2	0
(Spain) L Costas-Moreira	3	2
Q	(Colombia) M Duque	6	6

Quarterfinals
1/WC	(Estonia) K Kanepi	6	6
(Italy) K Knapp	1	4
3	(Austria) P Mayr-Achleitner	4	7	3
Q	(Colombia) M Duque	6	5	6

Semifinals
1/WC	(Estonia) K Kanepi	4	4
Q	(Colombia) M Duque	6	6

=== Bottom half ===
First round
6	(Czech Republic) R Voráčová	4	2
(Germany) T Malek	6	6
(Spain) E Cabeza Candela	6^{3}	5
(Canada) S Fichman	7^{7}	7
Q	(Slovenia) N Kolar	6^{5}	6^{4}
Q	(Georgia (country)) M Chakhnashvili	7^{7}	7^{7}
WC	(France) L Thorpe	6	1	1
4	(France) A Cornet	3	6	6
7	(Austria) Y Meusburger	3	6	2
(Romania) A Cadanțu	6	3	6
(Kazakhstan) S Karatantcheva	4	6	6
Q	(Slovenia) T Majerič	6	1	2
(Spain) L Arruabarrena-Vecino	1	4
(United States) J Cohen	6	6
(Netherlands) K Bertens	0	3
2	(Spain) L Pous Tió	6	6

Second round
(Germany) T Malek	6	2	2
(Canada) S Fichman	4	6	6
Q	(Georgia (country)) M Chakhnashvili	6	7
4	(France) A Cornet	0	5
(Romania) A Cadanțu	3	7^{7}	6
(Kazakhstan) S Karatantcheva	6	6^{3}	1
(United States) J Cohen	4	0
2	(Spain) L Pous Tió	6	6

Quarterfinals
(Canada) S Fichman	6	2	1
Q	(Georgia (country)) M Chakhnashvili	4	6	6
(Romania) A Cadanțu	7	7
2	(Spain) L Pous Tió	5	5

Semifinals
Q	(Georgia (country)) M Chakhnashvili	6^{3}	6	3
(Romania) A Cadanțu	7^{7}	2	6
