= 2009 Torneo Internazionale Regione Piemonte – Singles =

Singles
- 2009 Torneo Internazionale Regione Piemonte

Final
- Champion: (Croatia) Petra Martić
- Runner-up: (Canada) Sharon Fichman
- Score: 7–5, 6–4

Events
Singles	Doubles
← 2008 ·	Torneo Internazionale Regione Piemonte	· 2010 →

Mara Santangelo was the defending champion, however she chose not to compete this year.

Petra Martić won her maiden $100,000 title, defeating Sharon Fichman in the final, 7–5, 6–4.

== Seeds ==
1. (Romania) Alexandra Dulgheru (semifinals)
2. (Slovenia) Polona Hercog (semifinals)
3. (Austria) Patricia Mayr (quarterfinals)
4. (Australia) Jelena Dokic (second round)
5. (Bulgaria) Tsvetana Pironkova (first round)
6. (Czech Republic) Sandra Záhlavová (second round)
7. (Slovakia) Kristína Kučová (second round)
8. (France) Pauline Parmentier (second round)

== Draw ==
=== Key ===
- Q = Qualifier
- WC = Wild card
- LL = Lucky loser
- Alt = Alternate
- SE = Special exempt
- PR = Protected ranking
- ITF = ITF entry
- JE = Junior exempt
- w/o = Walkover
- r = Retired
- d = Defaulted
- SR = Special ranking

=== Finals ===
Semifinals
1	(Romania) Alexandra Dulgheru	3	7^{7}	2
(Canada) Sharon Fichman	6	6^{2}	6
(Croatia) Petra Martić	7	6
2	(Slovenia) Polona Hercog	5	3

Final
(Canada) Sharon Fichman	5	4
(Croatia) Petra Martić	7	6

=== Top half ===
First round
1	(Romania) A Dulgheru	6	6
WC	(Italy) R Oprandi	1	1
WC	(Italy) A Moroni	0	6	7
Q	(Italy) N Burnet	6	4	5
(Australia) J Moore	2	3
(Russia) E Bychkova	6	6
(Colombia) C Castaño	6	4	5
6	(Czech Republic) S Záhlavová	1	6	7
3	(Austria) P Mayr	6	6
WC	(Italy) M Caregaro	2	3
(Germany) J Schruff	5	1
(Croatia) K Šprem	6	6
(Italy) C Dentoni	3	2
(Canada) S Fichman	6	6
(Italy) K Knapp	6	4	4
7	(Slovakia) K Kučová	2	6	6

Second round
1	(Romania) A Dulgheru	6	6
WC	(Italy) A Moroni	2	1
(Russia) E Bychkova	6	6
6	(Czech Republic) S Záhlavová	4	3
3	(Austria) P Mayr	6	6
(Croatia) K Šprem	2	5
(Canada) S Fichman	6	6
7	(Slovakia) K Kučová	3	2

Quarterfinals
1	(Romania) A Dulgheru	6	6^{3}	6
(Russia) E Bychkova	1	7^{7}	3
3	(Austria) P Mayr	4	2
(Canada) S Fichman	6	6

Semifinals
1	(Romania) A Dulgheru	3	7^{7}	2
(Canada) S Fichman	6	6^{2}	6

=== Bottom half ===
First round
5	(Bulgaria) T Pironkova	4	7	4
(Czech Republic) Z Ondrášková	6	5	6
Q	(Russia) E Ivanova	6	6
(Argentina) B Jozami	2	0
(Croatia) P Martić	3	6	6
(Belarus) D Kustova	6	0	3
Q	(Croatia) D Jurak	6	4	2
4	(Australia) J Dokic	1	6	6
8	(France) P Parmentier	6	6
Q	(Russia) M Shamayko	0	4
(Czech Republic) R Voráčová	6	3	6
(Slovakia) Z Kučová	2	6	4
(Czech Republic) K Zakopalová	1	1
(Germany) K Wörle	6	6
WC	(Romania) A Bogdan	6	4	1
2	(Slovenia) P Hercog	4	6	6

Second round
(Czech Republic) Z Ondrášková	4	5
Q	(Russia) E Ivanova	6	7
(Croatia) P Martić	'6	6
4	(Australia) J Dokic	4	2
8	(France) P Parmentier	6	3	2
(Czech Republic) R Voráčová	3	6	6
(Germany) K Wörle	6	6^{3}	2
2	(Slovenia) P Hercog	1	7^{7}	6

Quarterfinals
Q	(Russia) E Ivanova	4	6	2
(Croatia) P Martić	6	3	6
(Czech Republic) R Voráčová	4	6^{6}
2	(Slovenia) P Hercog	6	7^{8}

Semifinals
(Croatia) P Martić	7	6
2	(Slovenia) P Hercog	5	3
