= 2011 Torneo Internazionale Regione Piemonte – Doubles =

Doubles
- 2011 Torneo Internazionale Regione Piemonte

Final
- Champions: (Spain) Lara Arruabarrena-Vecino (Russia) Ekaterina Ivanova
- Runners-up: (Slovakia) Janette Husárová (Czech Republic) Renata Voráčová
- Score: 6–3, 0–6, [10–3]

Events
Singles	Doubles
← 2010 ·	Torneo Internazionale Regione Piemonte	· 2012 →

Mariya Koryttseva and Ioana Raluca Olaru are the defending champions.
Lara Arruabarrena-Vecino and Ekaterina Ivanova won the title, defeating Janette Husárová and Renata Voráčová 6–3, 0–6, [10–3] in the final.

== Seeds ==
1. (Italy) Maria Elena Camerin / (Turkey) İpek Şenoğlu (quarterfinals)
2. (France) Alizé Cornet / (Croatia) Darija Jurak (first round)
3. (Austria) Sandra Klemenschits / (Germany) Tatjana Malek (quarterfinals)
4. (Canada) Sharon Fichman / (Spain) Laura Pous Tió (first round)

== Draw ==
=== Key ===
- Q = Qualifier
- WC = Wild card
- LL = Lucky loser
- Alt = Alternate
- SE = Special exempt
- PR = Protected ranking
- ITF = ITF entry
- JE = Junior exempt
- w/o = Walkover
- r = Retired
- d = Defaulted
- SR = Special ranking

=== Draw ===
First round
(Italy) G Gatto-Monticone (Slovakia) K Kučová	2	5
(Slovakia) J Husárová (Czech Republic) R Voráčová	6	7
4	(Canada) S Fichman (Spain) L Pous Tió	7^{7}	2	[5]
(United States) J Cohen (Kazakhstan) S Karatantcheva	6^{3}	6	[10]
(Italy) F Palmigiano (Italy) M Palmigiani	2	2
(Spain) E Cabeza Candela (France) L Thorpe	6	6
(Italy) A Balducci (Italy) K Knapp	6	6
(Georgia (country)) M Chakhnashvili (Georgia (country)) S Kvatsabaia	3	0
(Colombia) C Castaño (Colombia) M Duque	0	3
3	(Austria) S Klemenschits (Germany) T Malek	6	6
(Bulgaria) E Kostova (Czech Republic) S Záhlavová	4	1
(Switzerland) S Vögele (Slovakia) L Wienerová	6	6
(Spain) L Arruabarrena-Vecino (Russia) E Ivanova	6	6^{4}	[13]
2	(France) A Cornet (Croatia) D Jurak	4	7^{7}	[11]

Quarterfinals
1	(Italy) ME Camerin (Turkey) İ Şenoğlu	1	4
(Slovakia) J Husárová (Czech Republic) R Voráčová	6	6
(United States) J Cohen (Kazakhstan) S Karatantcheva	5	6	[10]
(Spain) E Cabeza Candela (France) L Thorpe	7	3	[6]
(Italy) A Balducci (Italy) K Knapp	6	6
3	(Austria) S Klemenschits (Germany) T Malek	1	4
(Switzerland) S Vögele (Slovakia) L Wienerová	6	4	[6]
(Spain) L Arruabarrena-Vecino (Russia) E Ivanova	4	6	[10]

Semifinals
(Slovakia) J Husárová (Czech Republic) R Voráčová	6	7^{7}
(United States) J Cohen (Kazakhstan) S Karatantcheva	4	6^{4}
(Italy) A Balducci (Italy) K Knapp	5	2
(Spain) L Arruabarrena-Vecino (Russia) E Ivanova	7	6

Finals
(Slovakia) J Husárová (Czech Republic) R Voráčová	3	6	[3]
(Spain) L Arruabarrena-Vecino (Russia) E Ivanova	6	0	[10]
