= 2012 Torneo Internazionale Regione Piemonte – Doubles =

Doubles
- 2012 Torneo Internazionale Regione Piemonte

Final
- Champions: (Czech Republic) Eva Hrdinová (Bosnia and Herzegovina) Mervana Jugić-Salkić
- Runners-up: (Austria) Sandra Klemenschits (Germany) Tatjana Malek
- Score: 1–6, 6–3, [10–8]

Events
Singles	Doubles
← 2011 ·	Torneo Internazionale Regione Piemonte

Lara Arruabarrena Vecino and Ekaterina Ivanova were the defending champions, but both decided not to participate.
Eva Hrdinová and Mervana Jugić-Salkić won the title, defeating Sandra Klemenschits and Tatjana Malek in the final with the score 1–6, 6–3, [10–8].

== Seeds ==
1. (Serbia) Vesna Dolonc / (Georgia (country)) Anna Tatishvili (first round)
2. (Uzbekistan) Akgul Amanmuradova / (Romania) Edina Gallovits-Hall (first round)
3. (Czech Republic) Eva Hrdinová / (Bosnia and Herzegovina) Mervana Jugić-Salkić (champions)
4. (Austria) Sandra Klemenschits / (Germany) Tatjana Malek (final)

== Draw ==
=== Key ===
- Q = Qualifier
- WC = Wild card
- LL = Lucky loser
- Alt = Alternate
- SE = Special exempt
- PR = Protected ranking
- ITF = ITF entry
- JE = Junior exempt
- w/o = Walkover
- r = Retired
- d = Defaulted
- SR = Special ranking

=== Draw ===
First round
1	(Serbia) V Dolonc (Georgia (country)) A Tatishvili	3	6	[10]
(France) C Garcia (Russia) I Khromacheva	6	4	[12]
(Italy) N Burnett (Italy) N Clerico	5	6	[4]
(Italy) A Brianti (Italy) ME Camerin	7	4	[10]
4	(Austria) S Klemenschits (Germany) T Malek	6	6
WC	(Italy) F Di Sarra (Italy) G Pairone	2	0
(Italy) G Barbieri (Italy) A Grymalska	6	6
WC	(Italy) F Bullani (Italy) V Verzoletto	3	0
(France) S Lefèvre (France) L Thorpe	6	3	[10]
(United States) J Cohen (United Kingdom) T Moore	3	6	[7]
(Australia) S Bengson (Romania) A Cadanțu	0	4
3	(Czech Republic) E Hrdinová (Bosnia and Herzegovina) M Jugić-Salkić	6	6
WC	(Italy) B Monaco (Italy) P Orlini Campos	1	0
(Ukraine) V Ivakhnenko (Russia) O Puchkova	6	6
(United States) J Craybas (Germany) K Wörle	6	6
2	(Uzbekistan) A Amanmuradova (Romania) E Gallovits-Hall	3	2

Quarterfinals
(France) C Garcia (Russia) I Khromacheva	1	6	[10]
(Italy) A Brianti (Italy) ME Camerin	6	3	[4]
4	(Austria) S Klemenschits (Germany) T Malek	7^{7}	6
(Italy) G Barbieri (Italy) A Grymalska	6^{3}	2
(France) S Lefèvre (France) L Thorpe	4	3
3	(Czech Republic) E Hrdinová (Bosnia and Herzegovina) M Jugić-Salkić	6	6
(Ukraine) V Ivakhnenko (Russia) O Puchkova	6	2	[10]
(United States) J Craybas (Germany) K Wörle	1	6	[8]

Semifinals
(France) C Garcia (Russia) I Khromacheva	6^{5}	3
4	(Austria) S Klemenschits (Germany) T Malek	7^{7}	6
3	(Czech Republic) E Hrdinová (Bosnia and Herzegovina) M Jugić-Salkić	6	6^{4}	[10]
(Ukraine) V Ivakhnenko (Russia) O Puchkova	3	7^{7}	[2]

Finals
4	(Austria) S Klemenschits (Germany) T Malek	6	3	[8]
3	(Czech Republic) E Hrdinová (Bosnia and Herzegovina) M Jugić-Salkić	1	6	[10]
