= 2011 Torneo Internazionale Regione Piemonte =

- Date: 5–11 September
- Edition: 12th
- Location: Biella, Italy

Champions

Singles
- (Romania) Alexandra Cadanțu

Doubles
- (Spain) Lara Arruabarrena-Vecino / (Russia) Ekaterina Ivanova
- Torneo Internazionale Regione Piemonte

The 2011 Torneo Internazionale Regione Piemonte was a professional tennis tournament played on clay courts. It was the 12th edition of the tournament which was part of the 2011 ITF Women's Circuit. It took place in Biella, Italy between 5 and 11 September 2011.

== WTA entrants ==
=== Seeds ===
| Country | Player | Rank^{1} | Seed |
|---|---|---|---|
| EST | Kaia Kanepi | 34 | 1 |
| ESP | Laura Pous Tió | 75 | 2 |
| AUT | Patricia Mayr-Achleitner | 93 | 3 |
| FRA | Alizé Cornet | 95 | 4 |
| ITA | Maria Elena Camerin | 119 | 5 |
| CZE | Renata Voráčová | 128 | 6 |
| AUT | Yvonne Meusburger | 130 | 7 |
| ITA | Romina Oprandi | 131 | 8 |

- ^{1} Rankings are as of August 29, 2011.

=== Other entrants ===
The following players received wildcards into the singles main draw:

- (Italy) Sara Eccel
- (Italy) Giulia Gatto-Monticone
- (Estonia) Kaia Kanepi
- (France) Laura Thorpe

The following players received entry from the qualifying draw:

- (Georgia (country)) Margalita Chakhnashvili
- (Colombia) Mariana Duque
- (Slovenia) Nastja Kolar
- (Slovenia) Tadeja Majerič

== Champions ==
=== Singles ===
(Romania) Alexandra Cadanțu def. (Colombia) Mariana Duque, 6–4, 6–3

=== Doubles ===
(Spain) Lara Arruabarrena-Vecino / (Russia) Ekaterina Ivanova def. (Slovakia) Janette Husárová / (Czech Republic) Renata Voráčová, 6–3, 0–6, [10–3]
