= 2012 Torneo Internazionale Regione Piemonte – Singles =

Singles
- 2012 Torneo Internazionale Regione Piemonte

Final
- Champion: (Sweden) Johanna Larsson
- Runner-up: (Georgia (country)) Anna Tatishvili
- Score: 6–3, 6–4

Events
Singles	Doubles
← 2011 ·	Torneo Internazionale Regione Piemonte

Alexandra Cadanțu was the defending champion, but lost in the quarterfinals against Johanna Larsson, who won the title by beating Anna Tatishvili 6–3, 6–4 in the final.

== Seeds ==
1. (Czech Republic) Barbora Záhlavová-Strýcová (quarterfinals)
2. (France) Pauline Parmentier (second round)
3. (Georgia (country)) Anna Tatishvili (final)
4. (Romania) Alexandra Cadanțu (quarterfinals)
5. (Netherlands) Kiki Bertens (first round)
6. (Switzerland) Romina Oprandi (semifinals)
7. (Sweden) Johanna Larsson (champion)
8. (Austria) Patricia Mayr-Achleitner (first round)

== Draw ==
=== Key ===
- Q = Qualifier
- WC = Wild card
- LL = Lucky loser
- Alt = Alternate
- SE = Special exempt
- PR = Protected ranking
- ITF = ITF entry
- JE = Junior exempt
- w/o = Walkover
- r = Retired
- d = Defaulted
- SR = Special ranking

=== Finals ===
Semifinals
(Italy) Nastassja Burnett	6	0	1
3	(Georgia (country)) Anna Tatishvili	3	6	6
7/WC	(Sweden) Johanna Larsson	6	6
6	(Switzerland) Romina Oprandi	1	2

Final
3	(Georgia (country)) Anna Tatishvili	3	4
7/WC	(Sweden) Johanna Larsson	6	6

=== Top half ===
First round
1	(Czech Republic) B Záhlavová-Strýcová	6	7
(France) C Garcia	0	5
(Spain) L Pous Tió	5	1
(Kazakhstan) Y Putintseva	7	6
(Italy) A Brianti	6	1	7
(Germany) T Malek	4	6	5
(Italy) N Burnett	6	7
5	(Netherlands) K Bertens	2	5
3	(Georgia (country)) A Tatishvili	3	6	6
(Russia) V Savinykh	6	3	3
(Czech Republic) E Birnerová	7^{7}	6
WC	(Italy) ME Camerin	6^{4}	4
WC	(Italy) G Pairone	6	6
(United States) J Cohen	3	3
WC	(Russia) I Khromacheva	6	6
8	(Austria) P Mayr-Achleitner	4	2

Second round
1	(Czech Republic) B Záhlavová-Strýcová	6	6
(Kazakhstan) Y Putintseva	1	2
(Italy) A Brianti	4	3
(Italy) N Burnett	6	6
3	(Georgia (country)) A Tatishvili	6	6
(Czech Republic) E Birnerová	2	4
WC	(Italy) G Pairone	1	1
WC	(Russia) I Khromacheva	6	6

Quarterfinals
1	(Czech Republic) B Záhlavová-Strýcová	6	3	2
(Italy) N Burnett	1	6	6
3	(Georgia (country)) A Tatishvili	6	6
WC	(Russia) I Khromacheva	2	0

Semifinals
(Italy) N Burnett	6	0	1
3	(Georgia (country)) A Tatishvili	3	6	6

=== Bottom half ===
First round
7/WC	(Sweden) J Larsson	6	6
Q	(Italy) F Di Sarra	2	3
Q	(Ukraine) V Ivakhnenko	6	6
(Russia) O Puchkova	4	0
(France) C Feuerstein	6	4	6
(United States) J Craybas	2	6	1
(Switzerland) S Vögele	4	6	2
4	(Romania) A Cadanțu	6	3	6
6	(Switzerland) R Oprandi	6^{5}	6	6
(Uzbekistan) A Amanmuradova	7^{7}	3	1
LL	(Bosnia and Herzegovina) M Jugić-Salkić	6	1	5
Q	(France) L Thorpe	3	6	7
Q	(Serbia) V Dolonc	6^{10}	2
(Romania) E Gallovits-Hall	7^{12}	6
(Spain) E Cabeza Candela	4	4
2	(France) P Parmentier	6	6

Second round
7/WC	(Sweden) J Larsson	6	6
Q	(Ukraine) V Ivakhnenko	1	2
(France) C Feuerstein	3	2
4	(Romania) A Cadanțu	6	6
6	(Switzerland) R Oprandi	6	4	7
Q	(France) L Thorpe	2	6	5
(Romania) E Gallovits-Hall	4	7^{7}	6
2	(France) P Parmentier	6	6^{2}	2

Quarterfinals
7/WC	(Sweden) J Larsson	6	3	6
4	(Romania) A Cadanțu	3	6	4
6	(Switzerland) R Oprandi	7	6
(Romania) E Gallovits-Hall	5	4

Semifinals
7/WC	(Sweden) J Larsson	6	6
6	(Switzerland) R Oprandi	1	2
