= 2007 Torneo Internazionale Regione Piemonte =

- Date: 9–15 July
- Edition: 8th
- Location: Biella, Italy

Champions

Singles
- (Poland) Agnieszka Radwańska

Doubles
- (Estonia) Maret Ani / (Estonia) Kaia Kanepi
- Torneo Internazionale Regione Piemonte

The 2007 Torneo Internazionale Regione Piemonte will be a professional tennis tournament played on clay courts. It will be the 8th edition of the tournament which is part of the 2007 ITF Women's Circuit. It will take place in Biella, Italy between 9 and 15 July 2007.

== WTA entrants ==
=== Seeds ===
Country	Player	Seed
GER	Martina Müller	1
POL	Agnieszka Radwańska	2
EST	Kaia Kanepi	3
ITA	Flavia Pennetta	4
ITA	Karin Knapp	5
ROM	Edina Gallovits	6
RUS	Ekaterina Bychkova	7
CZE	Klára Zakopalová	8

=== Other entrants ===
The following players received wildcards into the singles main draw:

- (Italy) Silvia Disderi
- (Estonia) Kaia Kanepi
- (Italy) Flavia Pennetta
- (Poland) Urszula Radwańska

The following players received entry from the qualifying draw:

- (Italy) Astrid Besser
- (Georgia (country)) Margalita Chakhnashvili
- (Ukraine) Mariya Koryttseva
- (Australia) Christina Wheeler

== Champions ==
=== Singles ===
(Poland) Agnieszka Radwańska def. (Italy) Karin Knapp, 6–3, 6–3

=== Doubles ===
(Estonia) Maret Ani / (Estonia) Kaia Kanepi def. (Bosnia and Herzegovina) Mervana Jugić-Salkić / (Czech Republic) Renata Voráčová, 6–4, 6–1
