= Biberach Open =

ITF Women's Tour
- Event name: Biberach
- Location: Biberach, Germany
- Category: ITF Women's Circuit
- Surface: Hard (indoor)
- Draw: 32S/32Q/16D
- Prize money: $50,000+H

The Biberach Open was a tournament for professional female tennis players played on indoor hard courts. The event was classified as a $50,000+H ITF Women's Circuit tournament and was held in Biberach, Germany, from 2005 to 2010, with the exception of 2008.

== Past finals ==
=== Singles ===
Year	Champion	Runner-up	Score
2010	(Sweden) Johanna Larsson	(Italy) Romina Oprandi	4–6, 6–2, 6–2
2009	(Croatia) Karolina Šprem	(Belgium) Kirsten Flipkens	6–1, 6–2
2008	Not held		
2007	(Austria) Yvonne Meusburger	(Germany) Martina Pavelec	7–6^{(7–3)},4–6, 7–5
2006	(Germany) Kristina Barrois	(Germany) Tatjana Malek	6–4, 5–7, 7–6^{(7–5)}
2005	(Germany) Kristina Barrois	(Czech Republic) Lucie Hradecká	7–5, 6–4

=== Doubles ===
Year	Champions	Runners-up	Score
2010	(France) Stéphanie Cohen-Aloro (Tunisia) Selima Sfar	(Germany) Mona Barthel (Germany) Carmen Klaschka	5–7, 6–1, [10–5]
2009	(Austria) Melanie Klaffner (Austria) Sandra Klemenschits	(Germany) Kristina Barrois (Austria) Yvonne Meusburger	3–6, 6–4, [17–15]
2008	Not held		
2007	(Russia) Nina Bratchikova (Poland) Urszula Radwańska	(Croatia) Darija Jurak (Bosnia and Herzegovina) Sandra Martinović	6–2, 6–0
2006	(Czech Republic) Olga Blahotová (Czech Republic) Lucie Hradecká	(Croatia) Darija Jurak (Czech Republic) Renata Voráčová	2–6, 6–4, 7–6^{(7–4)}
2005	(Czech Republic) Lucie Hradecká (Czech Republic) Sandra Záhlavová	(Germany) Kristina Barrois (Germany) Stefanie Weis	5–7, 6–2, 7–5
