= 2012 Torneo Internazionale Regione Piemonte =

Tennis tournament

- Date: July 2–8
- Edition: 13th
- Surface: Clay – Outdoor
- Location: Biella, Italy

Champions

Singles
- (Sweden) Johanna Larsson

Doubles
- (Czech Republic) Eva Hrdinová / (Bosnia and Herzegovina) Mervana Jugić-Salkić
- Torneo Internazionale Regione Piemonte

The 2012 Torneo Internazionale Regione Piemonte was a professional tennis tournament played on outdoor clay courts. It was the 13th edition of the tournament and was part of the 2012 ITF Women's Circuit. It took place in Biella, Italy between 2 and 8 July 2012.

== WTA entrants ==
=== Seeds ===
Country	Player	Rank^{1}	Seed
CZE	Barbora Záhlavová-Strýcová	62	1
FRA	Pauline Parmentier	70	2
GEO	Anna Tatishvili	73	3
ROU	Alexandra Cadanțu	84	4
NED	Kiki Bertens	86	5
SUI	Romina Oprandi	87	6
SWE	Johanna Larsson	92	7
AUT	Patricia Mayr-Achleitner	93	8

- Rankings are as of June 25, 2012.

=== Other entrants ===
The following players received wildcards into the singles main draw:

- (Italy) Maria Elena Camerin
- (Russia) Irina Khromacheva
- (Sweden) Johanna Larsson
- (Italy) Giulia Pairone

The following players received entry from the qualifying draw:

- (Serbia) Vesna Dolonc
- (Ukraine) Valentyna Ivakhnenko
- (Italy) Federica Di Sarra
- (France) Laura Thorpe

The following player received entry from a Lucky loser spot:

- (Bosnia and Herzegovina) Mervana Jugić-Salkić

== Champions ==
=== Singles ===
- (Sweden) Johanna Larsson def. (Georgia (country)) Anna Tatishvili, 6–3, 6–4

=== Doubles ===
- (Czech Republic) Eva Hrdinová / (Bosnia and Herzegovina) Mervana Jugić-Salkić def. (Austria) Sandra Klemenschits / (Germany) Tatjana Malek, 1–6, 6–3, [10–8]
