= Kristina Barrois =

German tennis player (born 1981)

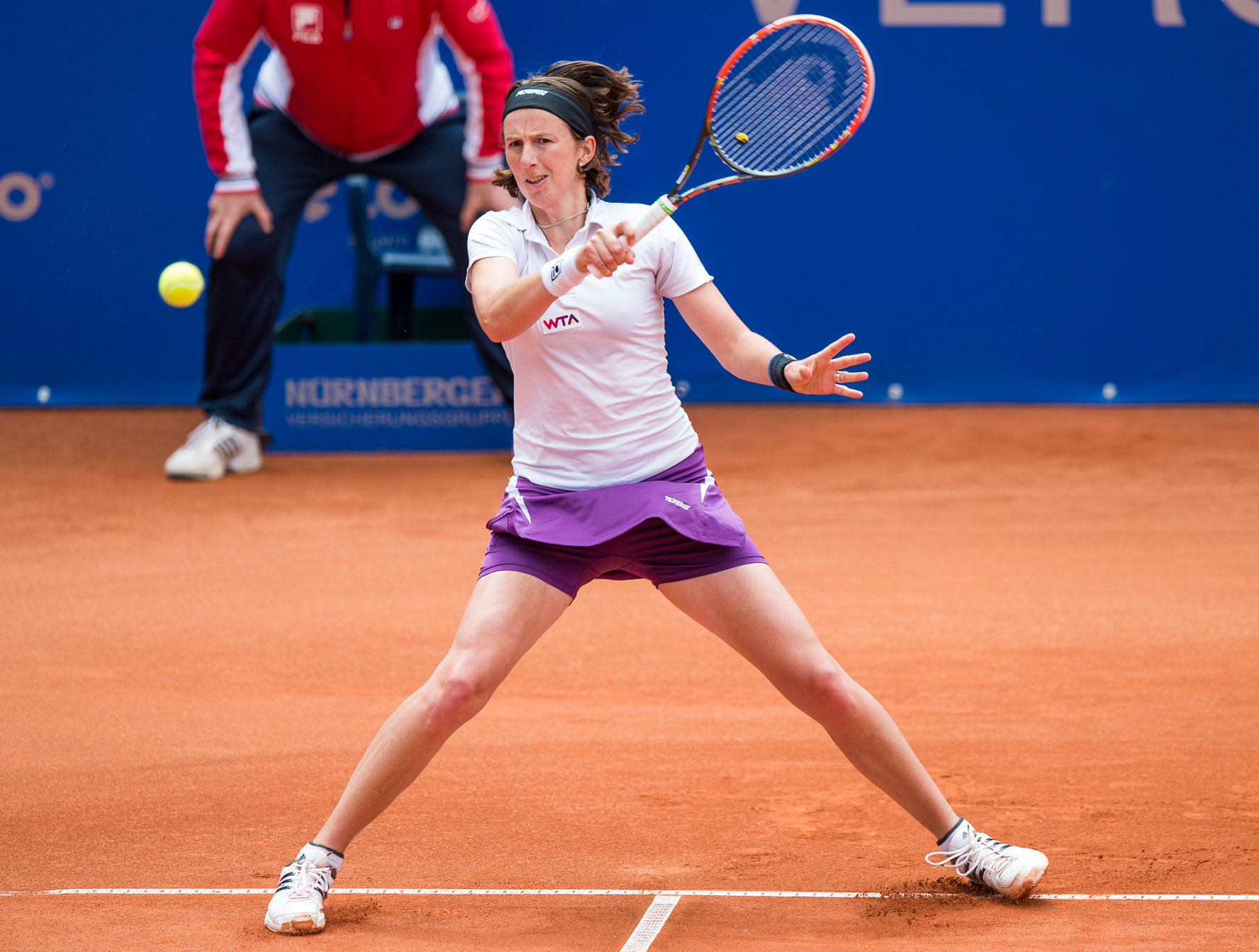
- Barrois at the 2014 Nürnberger Versicherungscup
- Country (sports): Germany
- Born: 30 September 1981 (age 44) Ottweiler, West Germany
- Height: 1.83 m (6 ft 0 in)
- Turned pro: 2005
- Retired: October 2014
- Plays: Right-handed (one-handed backhand)
- Prize money: $1,088,997

Singles
- Career record: 350–245
- Career titles: 15 ITF
- Highest ranking: No. 57 (9 May 2011)

Grand Slam singles results
- Australian Open: 2R (2010, 2011)
- French Open: 2R (2009)
- Wimbledon: 2R (2010)
- US Open: 2R (2009)

Doubles
- Career record: 200–139
- Career titles: 1 WTA, 16 ITF
- Highest ranking: No. 55 (20 February 2012)

Grand Slam doubles results
- Australian Open: 1R (2009, 2011, 2012)
- French Open: 2R (2011, 2014)
- Wimbledon: QF (2009)
- US Open: 2R (2011)

Team competitions
- Fed Cup: 0–3

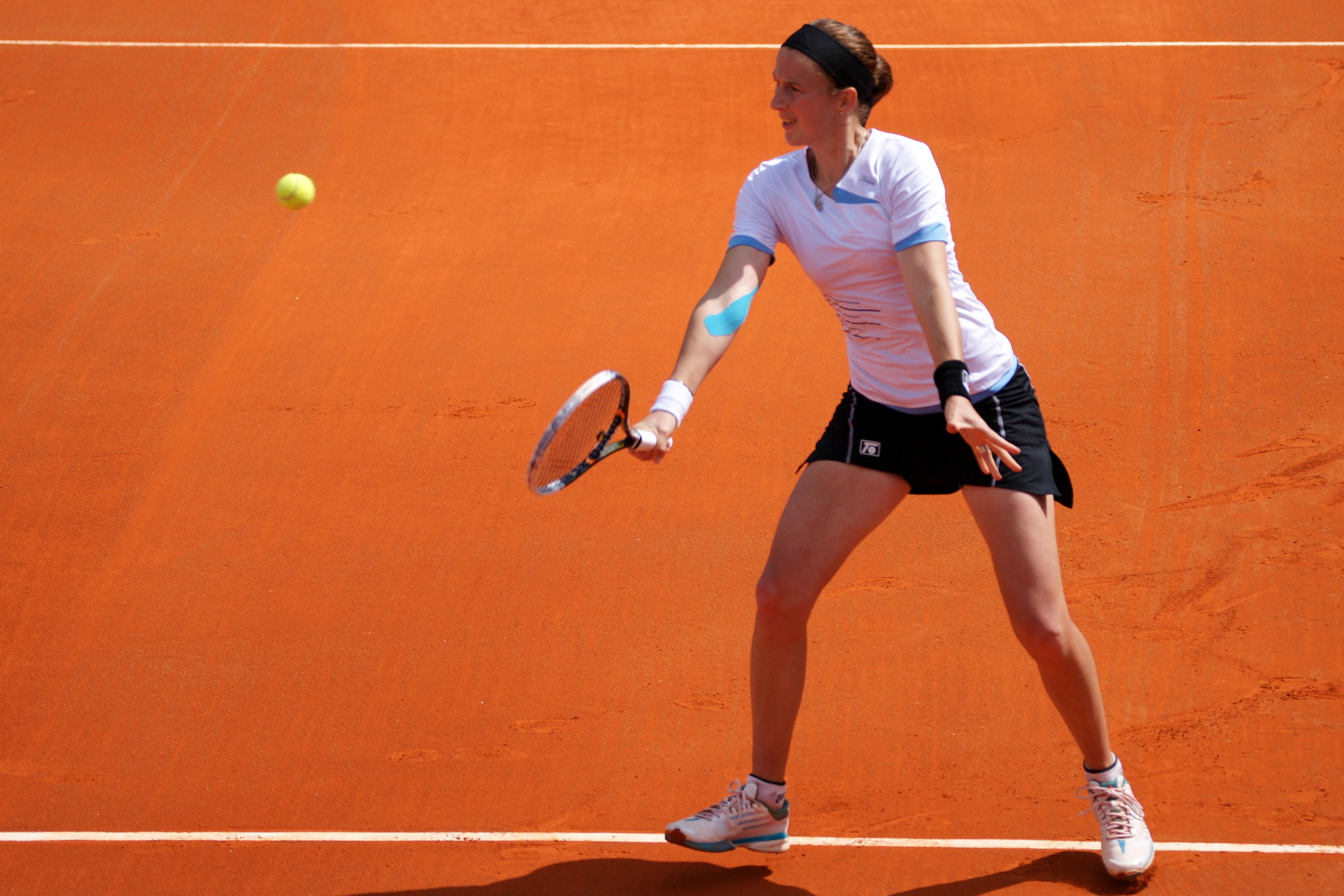
Barrois at the 2012 Open de Cagnes-sur-Mer

Kristina Barrois (born 30 September 1981) is a German former tennis player.

Barrois won 15 singles and 16 doubles titles on the ITF Women's Circuit in her career. On 9 May 2011, she reached her best singles ranking of world No. 57. On 20 February 2012, she peaked at No. 55 in the doubles rankings.

== Early life ==
Barrois began playing tennis at the age of nine in 1991 when she took the sport up herself and began to play at a tennis club. She completed her training as a government inspector at the Saarland Ministry of Justice before turning professional in 2005.

== Career ==
Barrois was trained by Patrick Schmidt, and later by Andreas Spaniol, and her stamina-trainer was the footballer Bernd Franke.

She played in the German Fed Cup team in 2006, losing her singles match to Li Na, and also losing her doubles match. In the same year, she won the German Tennis Championship. She also qualified for the main draws of the Wimbledon Championships and the US Open. At Wimbledon, she lost to Shenay Perry. At the US Open, she lost to the world No. 1, Amélie Mauresmo.

On 14 December 2008, she won her second German Tennis Championship, with a win in the final against the unseeded Lydia Steinbach.

In 2009, she started off well as she qualified for Auckland but lost to up-and-coming Russian teenager Anastasia Pavlyuchenkova. She then fell in the qualifying round of the Hobart event to British player Melanie South. She also reached the first round of the Australian Open, where she pushed the fourth-seeded Russian Elena Dementieva, but eventually lost in three sets. In February, she reached the second round in Memphis, but fell short against former world No. 30, Michaëlla Krajicek. In March, she played an ITF event where she lost in the quarterfinals to British player Katie O'Brien. At the Premier Mandatory event in Indian Wells, she beat Alizé Cornet in the second round, but lost to Ágnes Szávay in the next round. She reached the second round of the French Open, where Victoria Azarenka beat her and of the US Open, where she lost to Dinara Safina.

In 2010, she reached the second round on the Australian Open, losing to Samantha Stosur. She qualified for her first ever final in a WTA tournament, the Internationaux de Strasbourg, which Maria Sharapova won in straight sets. She reached the second round of Wimbledon, being knocked out by Justine Henin.

In 2011, she reached the second round of the Australian Open, this time losing to Anastasia Pavlyuchenkova. Barrois reached her second WTA Tour singles final at the Estoril Open, but lost to Anabel Medina Garrigues.

After losing to Lucie Hradecká at the Luxembourg Open in October 2014, Barrois announced her retirement from professional tennis.

== WTA Tour finals ==
=== Singles: 2 (runner-ups) ===
Legend Grand Slam tournaments Premier M & Premier 5 Premier International (0–2)	Finals by surface Hard (0–0) Clay (0–2) Grass (0–0) Carpet (0–0)

Outcome	No.	Date	Tournament	Surface	Opponent	Score
Runner-up	1.	22 May 2010	Internationaux de Strasbourg, France	Clay	(Russia) Maria Sharapova	5–7, 1–6
Runner-up	2.	30 April 2011	Estoril Open, Portugal	Clay	(Spain) Anabel Medina Garrigues	1–6, 2–6

=== Doubles: 4 (1 title, 3 runner-ups) ===
Legend Grand Slam tournaments Premier M & Premier 5 Premier (0–1) International (1–2)	Finals by surface Hard (1–1) Clay (0–2) Grass (0–0) Carpet (0–0)

Outcome	No.	Date	Tournament	Surface	Partner	Opponents	Score
Runner-up	1.	24 April 2011	Stuttgart Grand Prix, Germany	Clay (i)	(Germany) Jasmin Wöhr	(Germany) Sabine Lisicki (Australia) Samantha Stosur	1–6, 6–7^{(5–7)}
Runner-up	2.	21 July 2013	Gastein Ladies, Austria	Clay	(Greece) Eleni Daniilidou	(Austria) Sandra Klemenschits (Slovenia) Andreja Klepač	1–6, 4–6
Runner-up	3.	20 October 2013	Luxembourg Open	Hard (i)	(France) Laura Thorpe	(Liechtenstein) Stephanie Vogt (Belgium) Yanina Wickmayer	6–7^{(2–7)}, 4–6
Winner	1.	18 October 2014	Luxembourg Open	Hard (i)	(Switzerland) Timea Bacsinszky	(Czech Republic) Lucie Hradecká (Czech Republic) Barbora Krejčíková	3–6, 6–4, [10–4]

== ITF Circuit finals ==
$100,000 tournaments
$75,000 tournaments
$50,000 tournaments
$25,000 tournaments
$10,000 tournaments

=== Singles: 22 (15–7) ===
Outcome	No.	Date	Tournament	Surface	Opponent	Score
Winner	1.	29 August 2004	ITF Bielefeld, Germany	Clay	(Germany) Nicole Seitenbecher	6–4, 6–1
Winner	2.	24 January 2005	ITF Oberhaching, Germany	Carpet (i)	(Germany) Sabine Klaschka	7–5, 6–4
Winner	3.	14 February 2005	ITF Albufeira, Portugal	Hard	(Netherlands) Lisanna Balk	6–2, 6–2
Winner	4.	21 February 2005	Biberach Open, Germany	Hard (i)	(Czech Republic) Lucie Hradecká	7–5, 6–4
Winner	5.	14 March 2005	ITF Sunderland, United Kingdom	Hard (i)	(Estonia) Anet Kaasik	7–6^{(2)}, 6–3
Winner	6.	31 July 2005	ITF Horb, Germany	Clay	(Czech Republic) Andrea Hlaváčková	7–5, 6–3
Runner-up	7.	18 September 2005	ITF Sofia, Bulgaria	Clay	(Austria) Tamira Paszek	6–7^{(5)}, 3–6
Winner	8.	25 September 2005	GB Pro-Series Glasgow, UK	Hard (i)	(Hungary) Gréta Arn	6–3, 3–6, 6–4
Winner	9.	9 October 2005	Open Nantes Atlantique, France	Hard (i)	(Italy) Alberta Brianti	6–4, 6–2
Winner	10.	6 February 2006	ITF Belfort, France	Hard (i)	(Belgium) Kirsten Flipkens	6–2, 3–6, 7–6^{(6)}
Winner	11.	28 February 2006	Biberach Open, Germany	Hard (i)	(Germany) Tatjana Maria	6–4, 5–7, 7–6^{(5)}
Runner-up	12.	29 October 2006	ITF Bratislava, Slovakia	Hard (i)	(Slovakia) Dominika Cibulková	5–7, 1–6
Runner-up	13.	14 October 2007	Open de Touraine, France	Hard (i)	(Sweden) Sofia Arvidsson	3–6, 2–6
Winner	14.	24 March 2008	ITF La Palma, Spain	Hard	(Bosnia and Herzegovina) Mervana Jugić-Salkić	5–1 ret.
Winner	15.	6 April 2008	ITF Hamburg, Germany	Hard (i)	(Croatia) Ana Vrljić	6–2, ret.
Winner	16.	7 September 2008	Open Denain, France	Clay	(France) Kinnie Laisné	6–2, 6–4
Runner-up	17.	19 October 2008	ITF Ortisei, Italy	Carpet (i)	(Italy) Mara Santangelo	3–6, ret.
Runner-up	18.	9 November 2008	Ismaning Open, Germany	Carpet (i)	(Germany) Tatjana Maria	2–6, 3–6
Runner-up	19.	29 August 2009	Bronx Open, United States	Hard	(Germany) Tatjana Maria	1–6, 4–6
Runner-up	20.	8 November 2009	Ismaning Open, Germany	Carpet (i)	(Czech Republic) Barbora Strýcová	4–6, 6–4, 6–7^{(5)}
Winner	21.	7 April 2013	ITF Dijon, France	Hard (i)	(Bulgaria) Elitsa Kostova	6–3, 7–5
Winner	22.	25 August 2013	ITF Braunschweig, Germany	Clay	(France) Myrtille Georges	4–6, 6–2, 6–3

=== Doubles: 30 (16–14) ===
Outcome	No.	Date	Tournament	Surface	Partner	Opponents	Score
Winner	1.	17 January 2005	ITF Oberhaching, Germany	Carpet (i)	(Germany) Korina Perkovic	(Czech Republic) Lucie Hradecká (Czech Republic) Zuzana Zálabská	6–3, 5–7, 7–6^{(6)}
Runner-up	2.	21 February 2005	Biberach Open, Germany	Hard (i)	(Germany) Stefanie Weis	(Czech Republic) Lucie Hradecká (Czech Republic) Sandra Záhlavová	7–5, 2–6, 5–7
Runner-up	3.	27 June 2005	ITF Stuttgart, Germany	Clay	(Germany) Kathrin Wörle-Scheller	(Ukraine) Yuliya Beygelzimer (Germany) Vanessa Henke	6–7^{(5)}, 1–6
Winner	4.	14 August 2005	Ladies Open Hechingen, Germany	Clay	(Germany) Jasmin Wöhr	(Czech Republic) Renata Voráčová (Czech Republic) Sandra Záhlavová	4–6, 7–6^{(3)}, 6–4
Winner	5.	22 August 2005	ITF Bielefeld, Germany	Clay	(Germany) Korina Perkovic	(Germany) Justine Ozga (Germany) Andrea Sieveke	7–6^{(1)}, 6–3
Winner	6.	30 January 2006	ITF Belfort, France	Hard (i)	(Germany) Kathrin Wörle-Scheller	(Russia) Ekaterina Ivanova (Latvia) Irina Kuzmina	6–1, 6–2
Runner-up	7.	14 March 2006	ITF Fuerteventura, Spain	Clay	(Germany) Angelika Bachmann	(Ukraine) Yuliya Beygelzimer (Germany) Angelika Rösch	6–3, 6–7^{(5)}, 6–4
Winner	8.	11 November 2007	Ismaning Open, Germany	Carpet (i)	(Germany) Julia Görges	(Czech Republic) Andrea Hlaváčková (Czech Republic) Lucie Hradecká	2–6, 6–2, [10–7]
Winner	9.	6 July 2008	ITF Stuttgart, Germany	Clay	(Germany) Laura Siegemund	(Hungary) Katalin Marosi (Brazil) Marina Tavares	6–3, 6–4
Runner-up	10.	8 September 2008	ITF Athens, Greece	Clay	(Germany) Julia Schruff	(Romania) Sorana Cîrstea (Kazakhstan) Galina Voskoboeva	2–6, 4–6
Winner	11.	6 October 2008	Open de Touraine, France	Hard	(Bosnia and Herzegovina) Mervana Jugić-Salkić	(France) Julie Coin (France) Violette Huck	6–2, 7–6
Runner-up	12.	23 February 2009	Biberach Open, Germany	Hard (i)	(Austria) Yvonne Meusburger	(Austria) Melanie Klaffner (Austria) Sandra Klemenschits	6–3, 4–6, [15–17]
Runner-up	13.	19 September 2009	Save Cup, Italy	Clay	(Austria) Yvonne Meusburger	(Switzerland) Romina Oprandi (Austria) Sandra Klemenschits	4–6, 1–6
Winner	14.	27 September 2009	GB Pro-Series Shrewsbury, UK	Hard (i)	(Austria) Yvonne Meusburger	(Sweden) Johanna Larsson (United Kingdom) Anna Smith	3–6, 6–4, [10–7]
Winner	15.	29 August 2010	Bronx Open, United States	Hard	(Austria) Yvonne Meusburger	(South Africa) Natalie Grandin (United States) Abigail Spears	1–6, 6–4, [15–13]
Runner-up	16.	31 October 2010	ITF Poitiers, France	Hard (i)	(Uzbekistan) Akgul Amanmuradova	(Czech Republic) Lucie Hradecká (Czech Republic) Renata Voráčová	7–6^{(5)}, 2–6 [5–10]
Winner	17.	1 November 2010	Ismaning Open, Germany	Carpet (i)	(Germany) Anna-Lena Grönefeld	(Ukraine) Tetyana Arefyeva (Ukraine) Yuliana Fedak	6–1, 7–6^{(3)}
Runner-up	18.	24 July 2011	ITF Pétange, Luxembourg	Clay	(Germany) Anna-Lena Grönefeld	(Sweden) Johanna Larsson (Germany) Jasmin Wöhr	6–7^{(2)}, 4–6
Runner-up	19.	6 November 2011	Ismaning Open, Germany	Carpet (i)	(Austria) Yvonne Meusburger	(Netherlands) Kiki Bertens (United Kingdom) Anne Keothavong	3–6, 3–6
Runner-up	20.	11 June 2012	Open de Marseille, France	Clay	(Ukraine) Olga Savchuk	(France) Séverine Beltrame (France) Laura Thorpe	1–6, 4–6
Runner-up	21.	13 November 2012	ITF Zawada, Poland	Carpet (i)	(Austria) Sandra Klemenschits	(Czech Republic) Karolína Plíšková (Czech Republic) Kristýna Plíšková	3–6, 1–6
Winner	22.	12 April 2013	ITF Edgbaston, United Kingdom	Hard (i)	(Croatia) Ana Vrljić	(Netherlands) Richèl Hogenkamp (Liechtenstein) Stephanie Vogt	6–4, 7–6^{(2)}
Winner	23.	21 June 2013	ITF Ystad, Sweden	Clay	(Lithuania) Lina Stančiūtė	(Australia) Monique Adamczak (Turkey) Pemra Özgen	6–4, 7–5
Winner	24.	30 July 2013	ITF Stuttgart, Germany	Clay	(Germany) Laura Siegemund	(Liechtenstein) Stephanie Vogt (Poland) Sandra Zaniewska	7–6^{(1)}, 6–4
Winner	25.	10 November 2013	ITF Équeurdreville, France	Hard (i)	(Switzerland) Timea Bacsinszky	(Latvia) Diāna Marcinkēviča (Netherlands) Eva Wacanno	6–4, 6–3
Winner	26.	24 November 2013	ITF Sharm El Sheikh, Egypt	Clay	(Switzerland) Timea Bacsinszky	(Russia) Anna Morgina (Czech Republic) Kateřina Siniaková	6–7^{(5)}, 6–0, [10–4]
Runner-up	27.	25 January 2014	ITF Andrézieux-Bouthéon, France	Hard (i)	(Switzerland) Timea Bacsinszky	(Ukraine) Yuliya Beygelzimer (Ukraine) Kateryna Kozlova	3–6, 6–3, [8–10]
Runner-up	28.	8 March 2014	ITF Preston, United Kingdom	Hard (i)	(Switzerland) Timea Bacsinszky	(United Kingdom) Tara Moore (Russia) Marta Sirotkina	6–3, 1–6, [11–13]
Runner-up	29.	24 March 2014	ITF Croissy-Beaubourg, France	Hard (i)	(Greece) Eleni Daniilidou	(Russia) Margarita Gasparyan (Ukraine) Lyudmyla Kichenok	2–6, 4–6
Winner	30.	15 June 2014	Bredeney Ladies Open, Germany	Clay	(Germany) Tatjana Maria	(Belgium) Ysaline Bonaventure (Bulgaria) Elitsa Kostova	6–2, 6–2

== Grand Slam performance timelines ==
Key
W	F	SF	QF	#R	RR	Q#	DNQ	A	NH

(W) winner; (F) finalist; (SF) semifinalist; (QF) quarterfinalist; (#R) rounds 4, 3, 2, 1; (RR) round-robin stage; (Q#) qualification round; (DNQ) did not qualify; (A) absent; (NH) not held; (SR) strike rate (events won / competed); (W–L) win–loss record.

=== Singles ===
Tournament	2006	2007	2008	2009	2010	2011	2012	2013	2014	W–L
Australian Open	Q1	Q3	A	1R	2R	2R	1R	A	A	2–4
French Open	Q2	A	Q3	2R	1R	1R	Q1	A	A	1–3
Wimbledon	1R	Q1	Q3	1R	2R	1R	Q1	A	A	1–4
US Open	1R	A	Q3	2R	1R	1R	A	A	Q1	1–4
Win–loss	0–2	0–0	0–0	2–4	2–4	1–4	0–1	0–0	0–0	5–15

=== Doubles ===
Tournament	2009	2010	2011	2012	2013	2014	W–L
Australian Open	1R	A	1R	1R	A	A	0–3
French Open	1R	1R	2R	1R	A	2R	2–5
Wimbledon	QF	3R	2R	2R	A	3R	9–5
US Open	1R	1R	2R	A	A	1R	1–4
Win–loss	3–4	2–3	3–4	1–3	0–0	3–3	12–17
