= Sandra Záhlavová =

Czech tennis player

- Country (sports): Czech Republic
- Born: 10 October 1985 (age 40) Plzeň, Czechoslovakia
- Height: 1.67 m (5 ft 5 1/2 in)
- Plays: Right-handed (two-handed backhand)
- Prize money: US$ 583,310

Singles
- Career record: 441–326
- Career titles: 12 ITF
- Highest ranking: 78 (21 June 2010)

Grand Slam singles results
- Australian Open: 3R (2011)
- French Open: 1R (2010, 2011, 2013)
- Wimbledon: 1R (2010, 2011)
- US Open: 1R (2008, 2010)

Doubles
- Career record: 122–96
- Career titles: 9 ITF
- Highest ranking: 165 (12 June 2006)

Sandra Záhlavová (born 10 October 1985) is a Czech former tennis player.

== Career ==
Záhlavová won 12 singles and nine doubles titles on the ITF Women's Circuit in her career. On 21 June 2010, she reached her best singles ranking of world No. 78. On 12 June 2006, she peaked at No. 165 in the doubles rankings.

== Personal life ==
She was related to tennis player Barbora Strýcová by marriage — her cousin, tennis coach Jakub Záhlava, was Strýcová's husband until their divorce in 2015.

== Performance timelines ==
Key
W	F	SF	QF	#R	RR	Q#	P#	DNQ	A	Z#	PO	G	S	B	NMS	NTI	P	NH

(W) winner; (F) finalist; (SF) semifinalist; (QF) quarterfinalist; (#R) rounds 4, 3, 2, 1; (RR) round-robin stage; (Q#) qualification round; (P#) preliminary round; (DNQ) did not qualify; (A) absent; (Z#) Davis/Fed Cup Zonal Group (with number indication) or (PO) play-off; (G) gold, (S) silver or (B) bronze Olympic/Paralympic medal; (NMS) not a Masters tournament; (NTI) not a Tier I tournament; (P) postponed; (NH) not held; (SR) strike rate (events won / competed); (W–L) win–loss record.
To avoid confusion and double counting, these charts are updated at the conclusion of a tournament or when the player's participation has ended.

=== Singles ===
Tournament	2006	2007	2008	2009	2010	2011	2012	2013	SR	W–L	Win %
Grand Slam tournaments
Australian Open	Q1	1R	A	Q1	2R	3R	A	A	0 / 3	2–3	40%
French Open	Q1	Q1	Q1	Q2	1R	1R	A	1R	0 / 3	0–3	0%
Wimbledon	Q1	Q1	A	Q1	1R	1R	A	Q1	0 / 2	0–2	0%
US Open	Q2	Q1	1R	Q2	1R	A	A	A	0 / 2	0–2	0%
Win–loss	0–0	0–1	0–1	0–0	1–4	1–3	0–0	0–1	0 / 9	2–10	17%
WTA Premier Mandatory & 5
Indian Wells Open	A	Q1	A	A	Q1	Q1	A	A	0 / 0	0–0	–
Miami Open	A	A	A	A	A	Q1	A	A	0 / 0	0–0	–
Italian Open	A	A	A	A	1R	A	A	A	0 / 1	0–1	0%
Career statistics
	2006	2007	2008	2009	2010	2011	2012	2013	Career		
Tournaments	0	3	2	4	16	12	0	2	Career total: 39		
Hard win–loss	0–0	0–2	0–2	0–2	2–4	2–5	0–0	0–0	0 / 15	4–15	21%
Clay win–loss	0–0	0–1	0–0	0–2	4–9	2–5	0–0	0–2	0 / 19	6–19	24%
Grass win–loss	0–0	0–0	0–0	0–0	2–3	0–2	0–0	0–0	0 / 5	2–5	29%
Overall win–loss	0–0	0–3	0–2	0–4	8–16	4–12	0–0	0–2	0 / 39	12–39	24%
Win %	–	0%	0%	0%	33%	25%	–	0%	Career total: 24%		
Year-end ranking (Note: 2001: WTA ranking–1045, 2002: WTA ranking–922, 2003: WTA ranking–658, 2004: WTA ranking–380, 2005: WTA ranking–205, ... 2020: WTA ranking–868, 2021: WTA ranking–1196.)	154	184	182	104	89	154	246	241	$583,310		

=== Doubles ===
Tournament	2006	2007	SR	W–L	Win %
Grand Slam tournaments
Australian Open	A	A	0 / 0	0–0	–
French Open	A	A	0 / 0	0–0	–
Wimbledon	A	A	0 / 0	0–0	–
US Open	A	A	0 / 0	0–0	–
Win–loss	0–0	0–0	0 / 0	0–0	–
Career statistics
Tournaments	1	1	Career total: 2		
Overall win–loss	0–1	0–1	0 / 2	0–2	0%
Year-end ranking (Note: 2002: WTA ranking–895, 2003: WTA ranking–685, 2004: WTA ranking–252, 2005: WTA ranking–180, ... 2008: WTA ranking–584, ... 2011: WTA ranking–1229.)	216	315			

== ITF finals ==
=== Singles: 25 (12 titles, 13 runner-ups) ===
Legend
$100,000 tournaments
$75,000 tournaments
$50,000 tournaments
$25,000 tournaments
$15,000 tournaments
$10,000 tournaments

Result	W–L	Date	Tournament	Tier	Surface	Opponent	Score
Loss	1.	Jul 2004	ITF Monteroni d'Arbia, Italy	10,000	Clay	(Italy) Alexia Virgili	4–6, 4–6
Win	1.	Nov 2004	ITF Rome-Canottieri, Italy	10,000	Clay	(Italy) Stefania Chieppa	5–7, 6–2, 6–3
Loss	2.	May 2005	ITF Casale Monferrato, Italy	10,000	Clay	(Italy) Romina Oprandi	2–6, 0–6
Loss	3.	Aug 2005	ITF Gardone Val Trompia, Italy	10,000	Clay	(Luxembourg) Mandy Minella	4–6, 3–6
Win	2.	Aug 2005	ITF Bielefeld, Germany	10,000	Clay	(Germany) Franziska Etzel	3–6, 6–1, 7–5
Win	3.	Sep 2005	ITF Tbilisi, Georgia	25,000	Clay	(Serbia) Ana Timotić	6–0, 6–3
Loss	4.	Jul 2006	ITF Båstad, Sweden	25,000	Clay	(Romania) Simona-Iulia Matei	4–6, 6–4, 6–7^{(0–7)}
Loss	5.	Jul 2006	ITF Les Contamines, France	25,000	Hard	(Germany) Tatjana Malek	3–6, 4–6
Win	4.	Sep 2006	ITF Gliwice, Poland	25,000	Clay	(Germany) Tatjana Malek	6–4, 6–0
Loss	6.	Jul 2007	ITF Padova, Italy	25,000	Clay	(Georgia (country)) Margalita Chakhnashvili	6–3, 1–6, 3–6
Loss	7.	Mar 2008	ITF Buchen, Germany	10,000	Carpet (i)	(Belgium) Kirsten Flipkens	1–6, 6–3, 4–6
Win	5.	Dec 2008	ITF Delhi, India	50,000	Hard	(Serbia) Bojana Jovanovski	6–4, 6–3
Loss	8.	Apr 2009	ITF Bari, Italy	25,000	Clay	(Romania) Alexandra Dulgheru	4–6, 4–6
Loss	9.	Jun 2009	ITF Brno, Czech Republic	25,000	Clay	(Russia) Ekaterina Ivanova	0–6, 3–6
Win	6.	Jul 2009	ITF Zagreb, Croatia	75,000	Clay	(Latvia) Anastasija Sevastova	6–1, 7–6^{(7–4)}
Loss	10.	Aug 2009	ITF Trnava, Slovakia	25,000	Clay	(Austria) Yvonne Meusburger	6–7^{(0–7)}, 5–7
Loss	11.	Oct 2009	ITF Saint Raphael, France	50,000	Hard (i)	(France) Pauline Parmentier	6–7^{(4–7)}, 2–6
Win	7.	Nov 2009	ITF Opole, Poland	25,000	Carpet (i)	(Serbia) Ana Jovanović	6–0, 6–2
Loss	12.	Dec 2009	ITF Dubai, UAE	75,000	Hard	(Russia) Regina Kulikova	6–7^{(6–8)}, 3–6
Win	8.	Aug 2010	ITF Trnava, Slovakia	25,000	Clay	(Slovakia) Lenka Juríková	2–6, 6–3, 6–1
Win	9.	Nov 2010	ITF Opole, Poland	25,000	Carpet (i)	(Poland) Magda Linette	5–7, 7–6^{(7–4)}, 6–4
Win	10.	Sep 2012	ITF Alphen a/d Rijn, Netherlands	25,000	Clay	(Netherlands) Lesley Kerkhove	7–5, 7–6^{(7–5)}
Win	11.	Nov 2012	ITF Vendryně, Czech Republic	15,000	Hard (i)	(Czech Republic) Renata Voráčová	7–6^{(7–1)}, 6–0
Win	12.	Feb 2013	ITF Grenoble, France	25,000	Hard (i)	(Ukraine) Maryna Zanevska	6–4, 5–7, 6–2
Loss	13.	Mar 2013	ITF Croissy-Beaubourg, France	50,000	Hard (i)	(United Kingdom) Anne Keothavong	6–7^{(3–7)}, 3–6

=== Doubles: 22 (9 titles, 13 runner-ups) ===
Legend
$100,000 tournaments
$75,000 tournaments
$50,000 tournaments
$25,000 tournaments
$10,000 tournaments

Result	W–L	Date	Tournament	Tier	Surface	Partner	Opponents	Score
Loss	1.	18 October 2003	ITF Castel Gandolfo, Italy	10,000	Clay	(Italy) Valentina Sulpizio	(Austria) Betina Pirker (Sweden) Aleksandra Srndovic	3–6, 6–4, 6–7^{(7–9)}
Win	1.	20 June 2004	ITF Kędzierzyn-Koźle, Poland	10,000	Clay	(Czech Republic) Iveta Gerlová	(Ukraine) Kateryna Avdiyenko (Ukraine) Oxana Lyubtsova	6–3, 6–1
Loss	2.	10 July 2004	ITF Cuneo, Italy	50,000	Clay	(Czech Republic) Eva Hrdinová	(Romania) Edina Gallovits (Hungary) Zsofia Gubacsi	5–7, 3–6
Win	2.	17 July 2004	ITF Monteroni d'Arbia, Italy	10,000	Clay	(Italy) Valentina Sulpizio	(Croatia) Matea Mezak (Croatia) Nadja Pavić	7–5, 4–6, 7–6^{(7–5)}
Loss	3.	22 August 2004	ITF Kędzierzyn-Koźle, Poland	10,000	Clay	(Czech Republic) Iveta Gerlová	(Poland) Olga Brózda (Poland) Natalia Kołat	4–6, 1–6
Loss	4.	5 September 2004	ITF Arad, Romania	10,000	Clay	(Israel) Yevgenia Savransky	(Romania) Sorana Cîrstea (Romania) Gabriela Niculescu	4–6, 1–6
Loss	5.	19 September 2004	ITF Sofia, Bulgaria	25,000	Clay	(Romania) Gabriela Niculescu	(Hungary) Kyra Nagy (Hungary) Virág Németh	6–2, 2–6, 5–7
Win	3.	26 September 2004	ITF Volos, Grece	10,000	Carpet	(Czech Republic) Eva Válková	(Italy) Alice Balducci (Italy) Cristina Celani	7–6^{(9–7)}, 6–1
Loss	6.	2 October 2004	ITF Benevento, Italy	10,000	Hard	(Slovakia) Martina Babáková	(Italy) Giulia Gabba (Italy) Karin Knapp	2–6, 1–0 ret.
Loss	7.	23 October 2004	ITF Settimo San Pietro, Italy	10,000	Clay	(Italy) Raffaella Bindi	(Italy) Stefania Chieppa (France) Sylvia Montero	6–7^{(5–7)}, 6–3, 2–6
Loss	8.	30 October 2004	ITF Quartu Sant'Elena, Italy	10,000	Hard	(Italy) Raffaella Bindi	(France) Anaïs Laurendon (France) Aurélie Védy	3–6, 6–3, 3–6
Loss	9.	6 November 2004	ITF Rome-Canottieri, Italy	10,000	Clay	(Italy) Valentina Sulpizio	(Italy) Stefania Chieppa (Italy) Nicole Clerico	6–3, 4–6, 2–6
Win	4.	21 February 2005	ITF Biberach, Germany	10,000	Hard (i)	(Czech Republic) Lucie Hradecká	(Germany) Kristina Barrois (Germany) Stefanie Weis	5–7, 6–2, 7–5
Win	5.	19 March 2005	ITF Rome-Borghesiana, Italy	10,000	Clay	(Italy) Valentina Sulpizio	(Italy) Raffaella Bindi (Italy) Stefania Chieppa	7–5, 6–4
Win	6.	Mar 2005	ITF Rome-Parioli, Italy	10,000	Clay	(Italy) Valentina Sulpizio	(Croatia) Ivana Abramović (Austria) Stefanie Haidner	7–5, 5–7, 6–1
Win	7.	Apr 2005	ITF Civitavecchia, Italy	25,000	Clay	(Czech Republic) Lucie Hradecká	(Romania) Gabriela Niculescu (Romania) Monica Niculescu	6–4, 6–3
Loss	10.	Aug 2005	ITF Hechingen, Germany	25,000	Clay	(Czech Republic) Renata Voráčová	(Germany) Kristina Barrois (Germany) Jasmin Wöhr	6–4, 6–7^{(3–7)}, 4–6
Loss	11.	Aug 2005	ITF Kędzierzyn-Koźle, Poland	25,000	Clay	(Czech Republic) Renata Voráčová	(Poland) Agnieszka Radwańska (Poland) Urszula Radwańska	1–6, 4–6
Win	8.	Oct 2005	ITF Saint-Raphaël, France	50,000	Hard (i)	(Czech Republic) Lucie Hradecká	(Argentina) María Emilia Salerni (United States) Meilen Tu	4–6, 6–4, 7–5
Loss	12.	Dec 2005	ITF Valašské Meziříčí, Czech Republic	25,000	Hard (i)	(Czech Republic) Lucie Hradecká	(Croatia) Darija Jurak (Czech Republic) Renata Voráčová	3–6, 3–6
Win	9.	19 May 2006	ITF Caserta, Italy	25,000	Clay	(Czech Republic) Petra Cetkovská	(Italy) Silvia Disderi (Italy) Valentina Sulpizio	6–2, 6–0
Loss	13.	23 July 2007	ITF Les Contamines, France	25,000	Hard	(Czech Republic) Petra Cetkovská	(Russia) Anastasia Pavlyuchenkova (Belgium) Yanina Wickmayer	w/o

== Record against other players ==
=== Record against top 10 players ===
- She has a 0–2 (0%) record against players who were, at the time the match was played, ranked in the top 10.

Result	W–L	Opponent	Rank	Event	Surface	Round	Score	Rank	H2H
2008
Loss	0–1	(Poland) Agnieszka Radwańska	No. 10	Stuttgart Open, Germany	Clay (i)	1R	3–6, 2–6	No. 198	
2011
Loss	0–2	(United States) Venus Williams	No. 5	Australian Open, Australia	Hard	2R	7–6^{(8–6)}, 0–6, 4–6	No. 97	
