= Torneo Internazionale Regione Piemonte =

Defunct tennis tournament
- Event name: Torneo Internazionale Regione Piemonte
- Location: Biella, Italy
- Venue: Circolo Tennis Biella
- Category: ITF Women's Circuit
- Surface: Clay / Outdoor
- Draw: 32S/32Q/16D
- Prize money: US$ 100,000
- Website: www.itfbiella.com

The Torneo Internazionale Regione Piemonte (also called the Biella Challenger) was a women's professional tournament played on outdoor clay courts. The event was classified as a $100k ITF Women's Circuit tournament, and held annually in Biella, Italy, from 2000 to 2012.

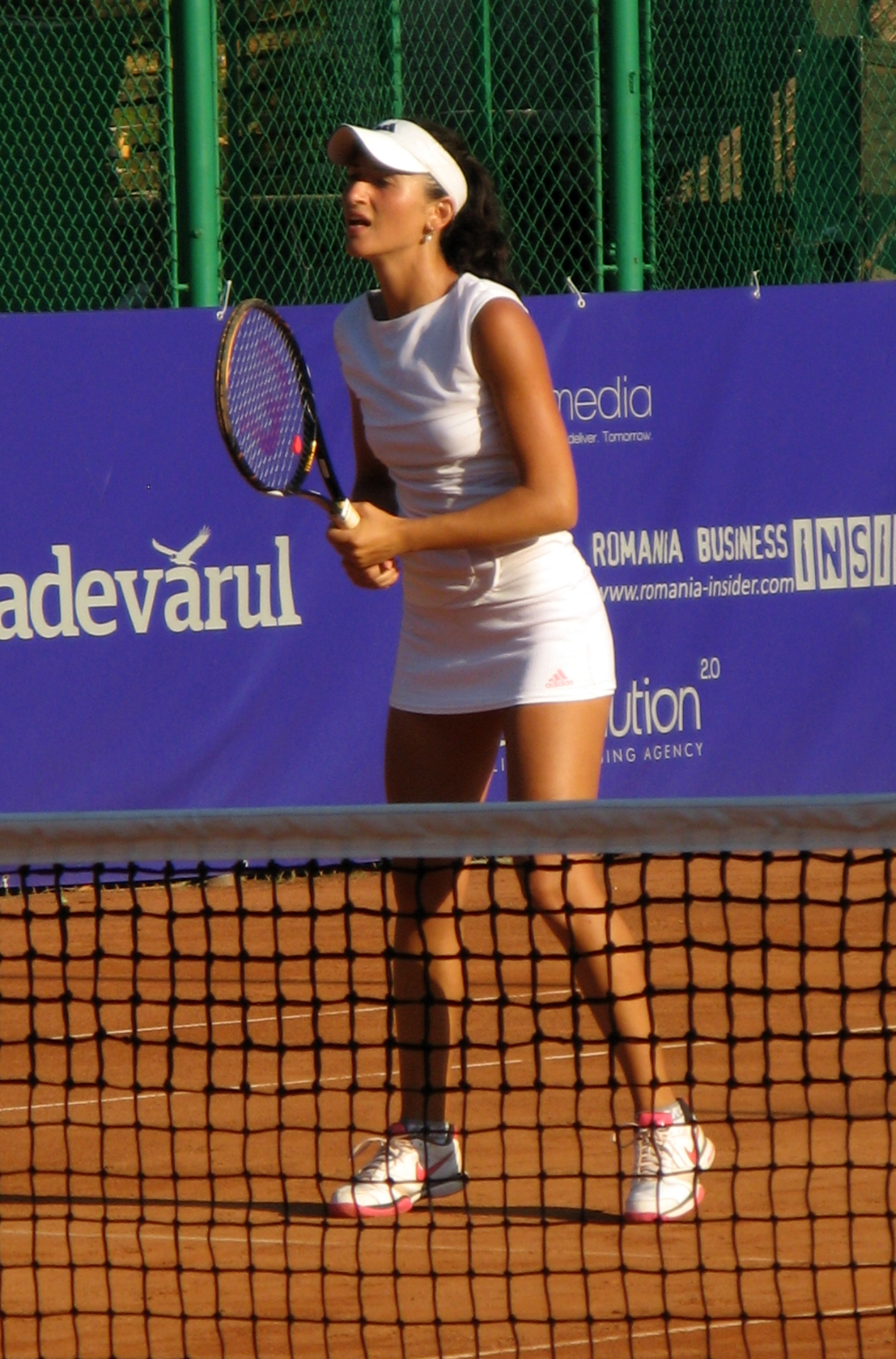
Romanian Alexandra Cadanțu was the 2011 singles champion

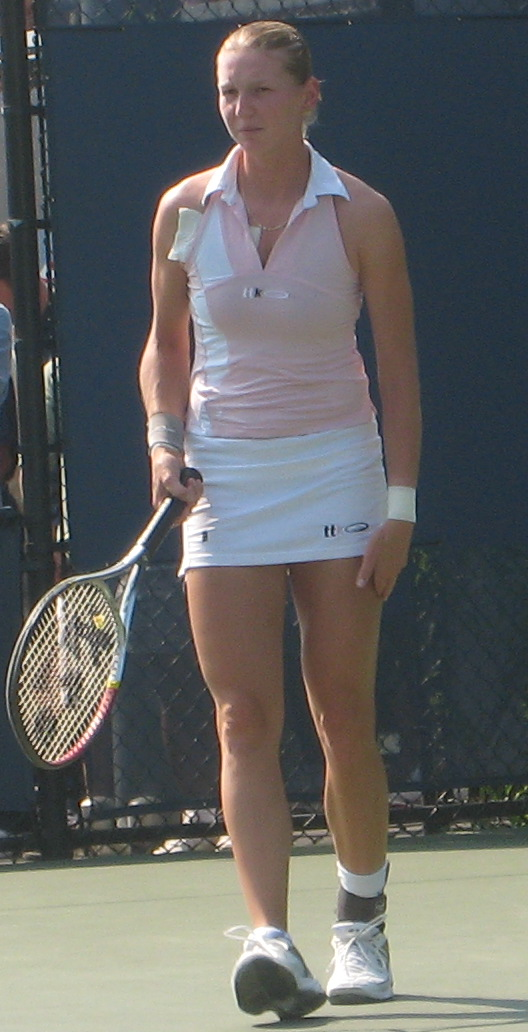
Czech Renata Voráčová won four titles here- one in singles and three in doubles. She was also runner-up on three other doubles occasions.

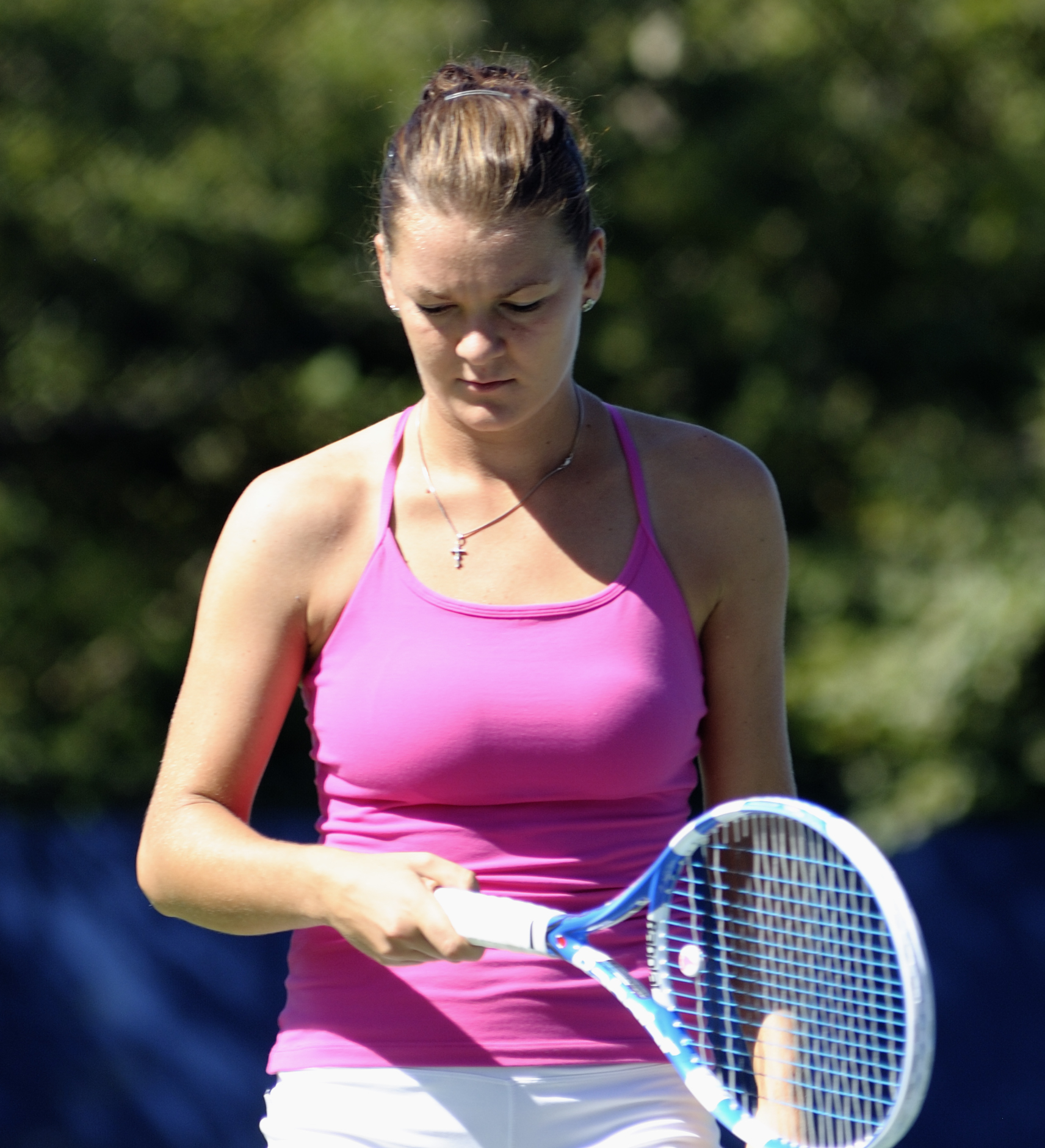
Future world No. 2, Agnieszka Radwańska, was the singles champion here in 2007.

== History ==
The tournament began as a $10k event in 2000. It was upgraded to a $25k event in 2001. From 2002 to 2006, it was a $50k event. Since 2007, it has been a $100k event.

== Past finals ==
=== Singles ===
Year	Champion	Runner-up	Score
2012	(Sweden) Johanna Larsson	(Georgia (country)) Anna Tatishvili	6–3, 6–4
2011	(Romania) Alexandra Cadanțu	(Colombia) Mariana Duque-Mariño	6–4, 6–3
2010	(Czech Republic) Renata Voráčová	(Czech Republic) Zuzana Ondrášková	6–4, 6–2
2009	(Croatia) Petra Martić	(Canada) Sharon Fichman	7–5, 6–4
2008	(Italy) Mara Santangelo	(Croatia) Jelena Kostanić Tošić	6–3, 6–1
2007	(Poland) Agnieszka Radwańska	(Italy) Karin Knapp	6–3, 6–3
2006	(France) Stéphanie Foretz	(Italy) Tathiana Garbin	7–5, 3–1^{r}
2005	(Ukraine) Yuliya Beygelzimer	(Italy) Giulia Gabba	6–2, 6–4
2004	(Czech Republic) Květa Peschke	(France) Virginie Razzano	6–1, 6–1
2003	(Slovakia) Henrieta Nagyová	(Hungary) Zsófia Gubacsi	6–3, 6–1
2002	(Italy) Flavia Pennetta	(Czech Republic) Sandra Kleinová	6–3, 6–2
2001	(Madagascar) Dally Randriantefy	(Brazil) Joana Cortez	6–1, 6–1
2000	(Slovenia) Maja Matevžič	(Italy) Nathalie Viérin	6–0, 6–2

=== Doubles ===
Year	Champions	Runners-up	Score
2012	(Czech Republic) Eva Hrdinová (Bosnia and Herzegovina) Mervana Jugić-Salkić	(Austria) Sandra Klemenschits (Germany) Tatjana Malek	1–6, 6–3, [10–8]
2011	(Spain) Lara Arruabarrena Vecino (Russia) Ekaterina Ivanova	(Slovakia) Janette Husárová (Czech Republic) Renata Voráčová	6–3, 0–6, [10–3]
2010	(Ukraine) Mariya Koryttseva (Romania) Raluca Olaru	(Slovenia) Andreja Klepač (France) Aurélie Védy	7–5, 6–4
2009	(Austria) Sandra Klemenschits (Czech Republic) Vladimíra Uhlířová	(Belarus) Darya Kustova (Czech Republic) Renata Voráčová	4–6, 6–3, [10–6]
2008	(Czech Republic) Renata Voráčová (Czech Republic) Barbora Záhlavová-Strýcová	(Spain) Lourdes Domínguez Lino (Spain) Arantxa Parra Santonja	4–6, 6–0, [10–5]
2007	(Estonia) Maret Ani (Estonia) Kaia Kanepi	(Bosnia and Herzegovina) Mervana Jugić-Salkić (Czech Republic) Renata Voráčová	6–4, 6–1
2006	(Czech Republic) Barbora Strýcová (Czech Republic) Renata Voráčová	(Czech Republic) Lucie Hradecká (Czech Republic) Michaela Paštiková	6–3, 6–2
2005	(Czech Republic) Lucie Hradecká (Czech Republic) Renata Voráčová	(Estonia) Maret Ani (Bosnia and Herzegovina) Mervana Jugić-Salkić	6–4, 7–6^{(7–4)}
2004	(Argentina) Erica Krauth (Germany) Martina Müller	(Bosnia and Herzegovina) Mervana Jugić-Salkić (Croatia) Darija Jurak	6–2, 6–3
2003	(Slovakia) Ľubomíra Kurhajcová (Czech Republic) Libuše Průšová	(Germany) Martina Müller (Czech Republic) Lenka Němečková	6–2, 6–4
2002	(Bulgaria) Lubomira Bacheva (Spain) Eva Bes Ostáriz	(Spain) María José Martínez Sánchez (Spain) Anabel Medina Garrigues	7–5, 2–6, 7–6^{(7–5)}
2001	(Brazil) Joana Cortez (Brazil) Vanessa Menga	(Austria) Daniela Klemenschits (Austria) Sandra Klemenschits	7–6^{(7–4)}, 4–6, 6–3
2000	(Germany) Kirstin Freye (Hungary) Adrienn Hegedűs	(Slovakia) Eva Fislová (Czech Republic) Zuzana Hejdová	6–2, 6–4
