= Renata Voráčová =

Czech tennis player (born 1983)

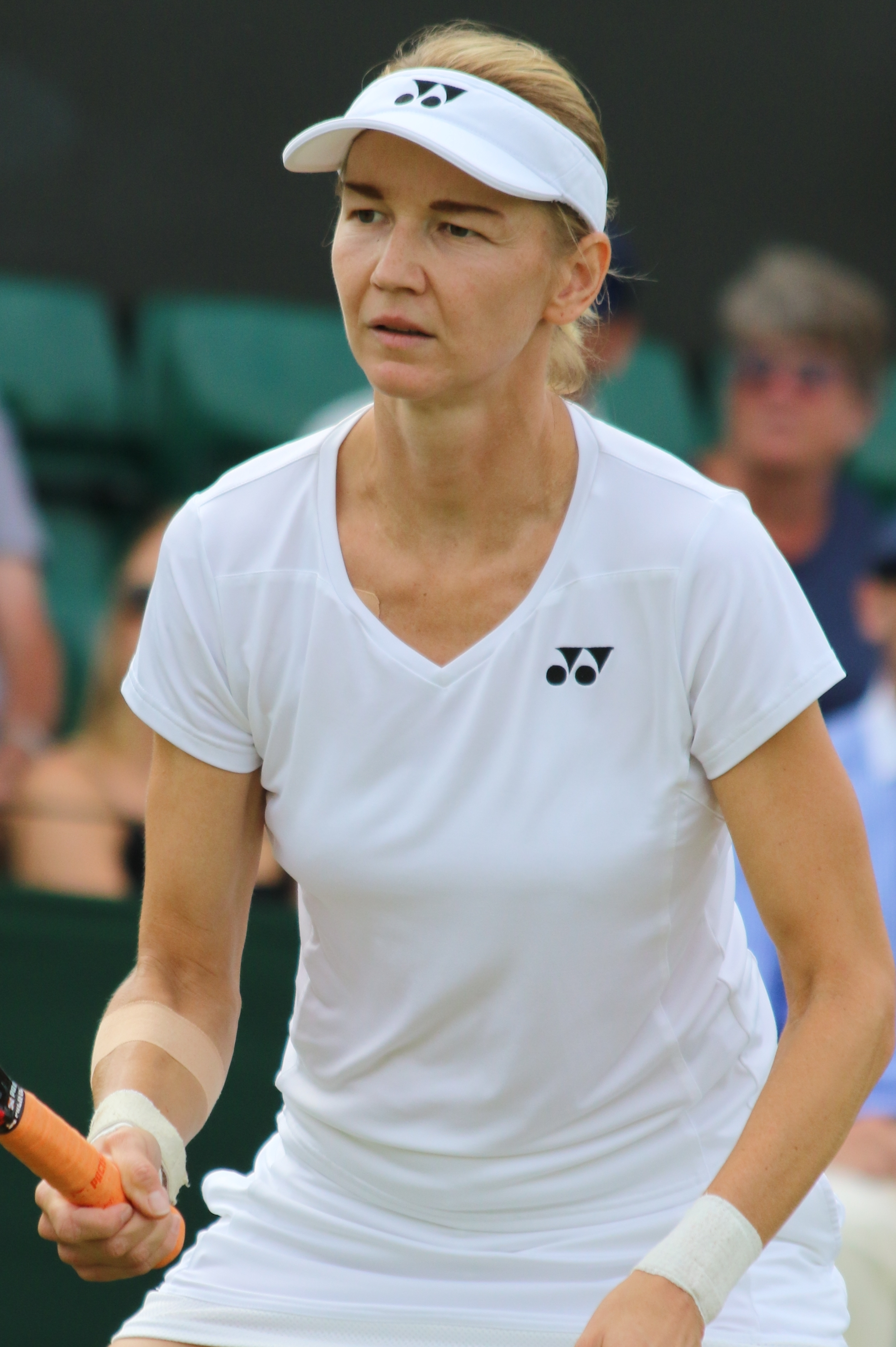
- Voráčová at the 2017 Wimbledon Championships
- Country (sports): Czech Republic
- Born: 6 October 1983 (age 43) Zlín, Czechoslovakia
- Height: 1.76 m (5 ft 9 in)
- Turned pro: 2000
- Plays: Right-handed (two-handed backhand)
- Coach: Libor Supert
- Prize money: US$ 1,945,079

Singles
- Career record: 500–425
- Career titles: 15 ITF
- Highest ranking: No. 74 (11 October 2010)

Grand Slam singles results
- Australian Open: 2R (2007)
- French Open: 1R (2011)
- Wimbledon: 1R (2008, 2010)
- US Open: 1R (2002, 2007, 2010)

Doubles
- Career record: 704–472
- Career titles: 11 WTA, 3 WTA Challenger
- Highest ranking: No. 29 (21 August 2017)

Grand Slam doubles results
- Australian Open: 2R (2003, 2014)
- French Open: 3R (2012)
- Wimbledon: SF (2017)
- US Open: 2R (2008, 2012, 2014, 2021)

Grand Slam mixed doubles results
- Australian Open: 1R (2008)
- Wimbledon: 3R (2011)
- US Open: 1R (2017)

Renata Voráčová (Czech pronunciation: [ˈrɛnata ˈvoraːtʃovaː]; born 6 October 1983) is a Czech inactive tennis player.

Voráčová has won eleven doubles titles on the WTA Tour and three on WTA 125 tournaments, as well as 15 singles and 59 doubles titles on the ITF Women's Circuit. On 11 October 2010, she reached a career-high singles ranking of world No. 74. On 21 August 2017, she peaked at No. 29 in the WTA doubles rankings.

== Background and early life ==
Voracova's father, Frantisek, owns a gas company, while her mother, Vlasta, manages a sports center. She also has brother, David, that is a professional dancer and still studying. She started playing tennis aged 7.

== Junior achievements ==
As a junior, Voráčová reached a career-high ranking of world No. 4 in singles and No. 3 in doubles. One of the highlights of her junior tennis career was winning the 2001 French Open doubles title, alongside Petra Cetkovská.

== Career ==
=== 2017 ===
At the Wimbledon Championships, Voráčová made the second week of a Grand Slam tournament for the first time in her career, with partner Makoto Ninomiya reaching the semifinals of the ladies' doubles. They lost in three sets to Chan Hao-ching and Monica Niculescu. Due to her surprise run, Voráčová reached a new career-high ranking of 32 on 17 July, after 17 years on the WTA Tour. And she even got better by the month of August, reaching world No. 29.

=== 2022 ===
Voráčová started her 2022 season at the Melbourne Summer Set 2, where she lost in the first round of the doubles tournament. Her Australian visa was later cancelled after her medical exemption from Australia's vaccination rules was rejected by the Australian government, forcing Voráčová to withdraw from the Australian Open amid her deportation.

== Performance timelines ==
Key
W	F	SF	QF	#R	RR	Q#	DNQ	A	NH

(W) winner; (F) finalist; (SF) semifinalist; (QF) quarterfinalist; (#R) rounds 4, 3, 2, 1; (RR) round-robin stage; (Q#) qualification round; (DNQ) did not qualify; (A) absent; (NH) not held; (SR) strike rate (events won / competed); (W–L) win–loss record.
To avoid confusion and double counting, these charts are updated at the conclusion of a tournament or when the player's participation has ended.

Only main-draw results in WTA Tour, Grand Slam tournaments, Fed Cup/Billie Jean King Cup and Olympic Games are included in win–loss records.

=== Singles ===
Current through the suspension of the 2020 WTA Tour.

Tournament	2002	2003	2004	2005	2006	2007	2008	2009	2010	2011	2012	2013	2014	2015	...	2018	SR	W–L	Win%
Grand Slam tournaments
Australian Open	Q3	Q1	Q1	A	A	2R	1R	Q1	1R	1R	A	A	Q3	1R		A	0 / 5	1–5	17%
French Open	Q1	Q3	A	Q2	A	Q3	Q1	Q1	Q2	1R	Q1	A	Q1	Q2		A	0 / 1	0–1	0%
Wimbledon	A	Q1	A	A	A	Q2	1R	Q2	1R	Q1	A	A	Q1	Q1		A	0 / 2	0–2	0%
US Open	1R	Q1	A	A	Q2	1R	Q1	Q1	1R	Q1	A	Q1	Q2	Q3		A	0 / 3	0–3	0%
Win–loss	0–1	0–0	0–0	0–0	0–0	1–2	0–2	0–0	0–3	0–2	0–0	0–0	0–0	0–1		0–0	0 / 11	1–11	8%
WTA 1000 tournaments
Indian Wells Open	A	Q1	Q2	A	A	A	1R	A	Q1	1R	A	Q2	A	Q1		A	0 / 2	0–2	0%
Miami Open	A	A	A	A	A	Q1	Q1	A	Q1	Q2	A	A	A	A		A	0 / 0	0–0	–
Canadian Open	A	A	A	A	A	A	A	A	A	A	A	A	A	A		Q1	0 / 0	0–0	–
Charleston Open	A	Q1	A	A	A	A	A	Not Tier I								NT1	0 / 0	0–0	–
Kremlin Cup	A	Q2	A	A	A	A	A	Not Tier I								NT1	0 / 0	0–0	–
Career statistics
Tournaments	5	5	0	0	1	8	6	1	11	11	0	1	2	2		0	Career total: 53		
Overall win–loss	2–5	2–5	0–0	0–0	1–1	4–8	2–6	1–1	7–11	3–11	0–0	2–1	0–2	0–2		0–0	0 / 53	24–53	31%
Year-end ranking (Note: 2000: WTA ranking–750, 2001: WTA ranking–240, 2016: WTA ranking–643, 2017: WTA ranking–N/A, 2019: WTA ranking–627.)	131	132	569	281	165	109	137	135	82	163	298	194	171	242		693	$1,752,426		

=== Doubles ===
Current through the 2023 Miami Open.

Tournament	2002	2003	2004	2005	2006	2007	2008	2009	2010	2011	2012	2013	2014	2015	2016	2017	2018	2019	2020	2021	2022	2023	SR	W–L	Win%
Grand Slam tournaments
Australian Open	A	2R	1R	A	A	1R	1R	1R	1R	1R	A	A	2R	1R	A	1R	1R	A	2R	1R	A (Note: 2022 Australian Open controversy.)	A	0 / 13	3–13	19%
French Open	A	1R	A	1R	A	1R	2R	1R	1R	2R	3R	1R	2R	1R	A	1R	2R	1R	1R	1R	A		0 / 16	6–16	27%
Wimbledon	A	3R	A	A	A	1R	1R	1R	1R	2R	1R	1R	3R	1R	1R	SF	1R	2R	NH	1R	1R		0 / 16	10–16	38%
US Open	A	1R	A	A	A	1R	2R	1R	1R	1R	2R	1R	2R	1R	1R	1R	1R	1R	A	2R	A		0 / 15	4–15	21%
Win–loss	0–0	3–4	0–1	0–1	0–0	0–4	2–4	0–4	0–4	2–4	3–3	0–3	5–4	0–4	0–2	4–4	1–4	1–3	1–2	1–4	0–1	0–0	0 / 60	23–60	28%
WTA 1000 + former tournaments
Dubai / Qatar Open (Note: The first Premier 5 event of the year has switched back and forth between the Dubai Tennis Championships and the Qatar Ladies Open since 2009. Dubai was classified as a Premier 5 event from 2009 to 2011 before being succeeded by Doha for the 2012–2014 period. In 2015, Dubai regained its Premier 5 status while Doha was demoted to Premier status. The Premier 5 tournaments were reclassified as WTA 1000 tournaments in 2021.)	Not Tier I						A	A	A	A	A	A	A	1R	A	A	1R	A	A	1R	A	A	0 / 3	0–3	0%
Indian Wells Open	A	A	1R	A	A	SF	1R	A	1R	2R	A	1R	A	1R	A	1R	1R	A	NH	1R	A	A	0 / 10	4–10	29%
Miami Open	A	A	A	A	A	A	2R	A	A	2R	A	A	A	1R	A	1R	1R	A	NH	A	A	A	0 / 5	2–5	29%
German / Madrid Open (Note: In 2009, the German Open was replaced by the Madrid Open. The Premier Mandatory tournaments were reclassified as WTA 1000 tournaments in 2021.)	A	A	A	A	A	A	1R	A	A	A	A	A	A	A	A	A	1R	A	NH	2R	1R		0 / 4	1–4	20%
Italian Open	A	A	A	A	A	A	A	A	A	A	A	A	A	2R	A	A	2R	A	1R	A	A		0 / 3	2–3	40%
Canadian Open	A	A	A	A	A	A	A	A	A	A	A	A	A	A	A	2R	1R	A	NH	1R	A		0 / 3	1–3	25%
Cincinnati Open	Not Tier I							A	A	A	A	A	A	A	1R	1R	1R	A	A	A	A		0 / 3	0–3	0%
Pan Pacific / Wuhan Open (Note: In 2014, the Pan Pacific Open was downgraded to a Premier event and replaced by the Wuhan Open. The Premier 5 tournaments were reclassified as WTA 1000 tournaments in 2021.)	A	A	A	A	A	A	A	A	A	A	A	A	A	A	A	2R	A	2R	NH	A	A		0 / 2	2–2	50%
China Open	Not Held		Not Tier I					A	A	A	A	A	A	A	A	1R	A	1R	NH	A	A		0 / 2	0–2	0%
Charleston Open	A	1R	A	A	A	A	A	Not Tier I											NH	Not Tier I			0 / 1	0–1	0%
Kremlin Cup	A	1R	A	A	A	A	A	Not Tier I											NH	NT1	NH		0 / 1	0–1	0%
Career statistics
Tournaments	5	13	5	2	3	13	14	10	19	15	4	9	11	13	16	28	28	23	12	28	14	1	Career total: 286		
Titles	1	0	0	0	1	2	0	1	1	1	1	0	1	0	0	1	0	1	0	0	0	0	Career total: 11		
Finals	1	0	0	0	2	3	0	2	3	1	1	0	1	1	2	2	0	2	0	0	0	0	Career total: 21		
Overall win-loss	8–4	7–13	4–5	0–2	6–2	22–11	9–13	12–9	19–19	15–14	7–3	5–9	11–10	8–13	18–16	23–27	8–28	23–22	5–12	17–28	4–14	0–1	11 / 286	231–275	46%

== WTA Tour finals ==
=== Doubles: 21 (11 titles, 10 runner-ups) ===
Legend WTA 1000 WTA 500 WTA 250 (11–10)	Finals by surface Hard (7–5) Clay (4–4) Carpet (0–1)

Result	W–L	Date	Tournament	Tier	Surface	Partner	Opponents	Score
Win	1–0	Nov 2002	Pattaya Open, Thailand	Tier V	Hard	(Republic of Ireland) Kelly Liggan	(Russia) Lina Krasnoroutskaya (Russia) Tatiana Panova	7–5, 7–6^{(9–7)}
Loss	1–1	Jul 2006	Budapest Grand Prix, Hungary	Tier IV	Clay	(Czech Republic) Lucie Hradecká	(Slovakia) Janette Husárová (Netherlands) Michaëlla Krajicek	6–4, 4–6, 4–6
Win	2–1	Sep 2006	Slovenia Open, Slovenia	Tier IV	Hard	(Czech Republic) Lucie Hradecká	(Czech Republic) Eva Birnerová (France) Émilie Loit	w/o
Win	3–1	Jul 2007	Gastein Ladies, Austria	Tier III	Clay	(Czech Republic) Lucie Hradecká	(Hungary) Ágnes Szávay (Czech Republic) Vladimíra Uhlířová	6–3, 7–5
Win	4–1	Sep 2007	Slovenia Open, Slovenia (2)	Tier IV	Hard	(Czech Republic) Lucie Hradecká	(Slovenia) Andreja Klepač (Russia) Elena Likhovtseva	5–7, 6–4, [10–7]
Loss	4–2	Oct 2007	Tournoi de Québec, Canada	Tier III	Carpet (i)	(Canada) Stéphanie Dubois	(United States) Christina Fusano (United States) Raquel Kops-Jones	2–6, 6–7^{(6–8)}
Win	5–2	Jul 2009	İstanbul Cup, Turkey	International	Hard	(Czech Republic) Lucie Hradecká	(Germany) Julia Görges (Switzerland) Patty Schnyder	2–6, 6–3, [12–10]
Loss	5–3	Oct 2009	Luxembourg Open, Luxembourg	International	Hard (i)	(Czech Republic) Vladimíra Uhlířová	(Czech Republic) Iveta Benešová (Czech Republic) Barbora Strýcová	6–1, 0–6, [7–10]
Loss	5–4	Apr 2010	Rabat Grand Prix, Morocco	International	Clay	(Czech Republic) Lucie Hradecká	(Czech Republic) Iveta Benešová (Spain) Anabel Medina Garrigues	3–6, 1–6
Loss	5–5	Jul 2010	Swedish Open, Sweden	International	Clay	(Czech Republic) Barbora Strýcová	(Argentina) Gisela Dulko (Italy) Flavia Pennetta	6–7^{(0–7)}, 0–6
Win	6–5	Oct 2010	Ladies Linz, Austria	International	Hard (i)	(Czech Republic) Barbora Strýcová	(Czech Republic) Květa Peschke (Slovenia) Katarina Srebotnik	7–5, 7–6^{(8–6)}
Win	7–5	Apr 2011	Rabat Grand Prix, Morocco	International	Clay	(Czech Republic) Andrea Hlaváčková	(Russia) Nina Bratchikova (Austria) Sandra Klemenschits	6–3, 6–4
Win	8–5	Jul 2012	Palermo Ladies Open, Italy	International	Clay	(Czech Republic) Barbora Strýcová	(Croatia) Darija Jurak (Hungary) Katalin Marosi	7–6^{(7–5)}, 6–4
Win	9–5	Oct 2014	Japan Women's Open, Japan	International	Hard	(Japan) Shuko Aoyama	(Spain) Lara Arruabarrena (Germany) Tatjana Maria	6–1, 6–2
Loss	9–6	Jan 2015	Auckland Open, New Zealand	International	Hard	(Japan) Shuko Aoyama	(Italy) Sara Errani (Italy) Roberta Vinci	2–6, 1–6
Loss	9–7	May 2016	Nuremberg Cup, Germany	International	Clay	(Japan) Shuko Aoyama	(Netherlands) Kiki Bertens (Sweden) Johanna Larsson	3–6, 4–6
Loss	9–8	Sep 2016	Tashkent Open, Uzbekistan	International	Hard	(Netherlands) Demi Schuurs	(Romania) Raluca Olaru (Turkey) İpek Soylu	5–7, 3–6
Loss	9–9	Jan 2017	Auckland Open, New Zealand	International	Hard	(Netherlands) Demi Schuurs	(Netherlands) Kiki Bertens (Sweden) Johanna Larsson	2–6, 2–6
Win	10–9	Aug 2017	Washington Open, United States	International	Hard	(Japan) Shuko Aoyama	(Canada) Eugenie Bouchard (United States) Sloane Stephens	6–3, 6–2
Loss	10–10	Jan 2019	Shenzhen Open, China	International	Hard	(China) Duan Yingying	(China) Peng Shuai (China) Yang Zhaoxuan	4–6, 3–6
Win	11–10	Jul 2019	Palermo Ladies Open, Italy (2)	International	Clay	(Sweden) Cornelia Lister	(Georgia (country)) Ekaterine Gorgodze (Netherlands) Arantxa Rus	7–6^{(7–2)}, 6–2

== WTA 125 finals ==
=== Doubles: 8 (3 titles, 5 runner-ups) ===
Result	W–L	Date	Tournament	Surface	Partner	Opponents	Score
Win	1–0	Nov 2014	Open de Limoges, France	Hard (i)	(Czech Republic) Kateřina Siniaková	(Hungary) Tímea Babos (France) Kristina Mladenovic	2–6, 6–2, [10–5]
Loss	1–1	Nov 2016	Open de Limoges, France	Hard (i)	(United Kingdom) Anna Smith	(Luxembourg) Mandy Minella (Belgium) Elise Mertens	4–6, 4–6
Win	2–1	Jun 2017	Bol Ladies Open, Croatia	Clay	(Chinese Taipei) Chuang Chia-jung	(North Macedonia) Lina Gjorcheska (Bulgaria) Aleksandrina Naydenova	6–4, 6–2
Loss	2–2	Mar 2019	Abierto Zapopan, Mexico	Hard	(Sweden) Cornelia Lister	(United States) Maria Sanchez (Hungary) Fanny Stollár	5–7, 1–6
Loss	2–3	Jun 2019	Bol Ladies Open, Croatia	Clay	(Sweden) Cornelia Lister	(Switzerland) Timea Bacsinszky (Luxembourg) Mandy Minella	6–0, 6–7^{(3–7)}, [4–10]
Win	3–3	Aug 2019	Karlsruhe Open, Germany	Clay	(Spain) Lara Arruabarrena	(China) Han Xinyun (China) Yuan Yue	6–7^{(2–7)}, 6–4, [10–4]
Loss	3–4	Sep 2022	Hungarian Pro Ladies Open	Clay	(Czech Republic) Jesika Malečková	(Hungary) Anna Bondár (Belgium) Kimberley Zimmermann	3–6, 6–2, [5–10]
Loss	3–5	Jun 2023	Makarska International, Croatia	Clay	(Czech Republic) Anna Sisková	(Estonia) Ingrid Neel (Chinese Taipei) Wu Fang-hsien	3–6, 5–7

== ITF Circuit finals ==
Legend
$100,000 tournaments
$75/80,000 tournaments
$50/60,000 tournaments
$25,000 tournaments
$10/15,000 tournaments

=== Singles: 29 (15 titles, 14 runner-ups) ===
Result	W–L	Date	Tournament	Tier	Surface	Opponent	Score
Loss	0–1	Jun 2000	Macha Lake Open, Czech Republic	10,000	Clay	(Czech Republic) Jitka Schönfeldová	4–6, 6–7^{(6–8)}
Win	1–1	Nov 2001	ITF Mexico City	25,000	Hard	(Colombia) Fabiola Zuluaga	6–1, 7–6^{(9–7)}
Loss	1–2	May 2003	Open Saint-Gaudens, France	75,000	Clay	(Ukraine) Tatiana Perebiynis	1–6, 4–6
Win	2–2	Mar 2005	ITF Amiens, France	10,000	Clay (i)	(France) Karla Mraz	4–6, 6–2, 6–3
Win	3–2	Jan 2006	ITF Stuttgart, Germany	10,000	Hard (i)	(Slovakia) Jana Juricová	6–2, 6–4
Win	4–2	Jun 2006	ITF Fontanafredda, Italy	25,000	Clay	(Georgia (country)) Margalita Chakhnashvili	6–3, 6–3
Win	5–2	Aug 2007	ITF Gdynia, Poland	25,000	Clay	(Romania) Liana Ungur	w/o
Loss	5–3	Jul 2008	ITF Pétange, Luxembourg	75,000	Clay	(France) Mathilde Johansson	6–2, 5–7, 5–7
Win	6–3	Oct 2009	Royal Cup, Montenegro	25,000	Clay	(Serbia) Ana Timotić	7–5, 2–1 ret.
Loss	6–4	Nov 2009	Open Nantes Atlantique, France	50,000	Hard (i)	(Netherlands) Arantxa Rus	3–6, 2–6
Loss	6–5	Nov 2009	Slovak Open, Slovakia	50,000	Hard (i)	(Russia) Evgeniya Rodina	4–6, 2–6
Win	7–5	Apr 2010	ITF Civitavecchia, Italy	25,000	Clay	(Italy) Anna Floris	6–3, 6–3
Win	8–5	Apr 2010	ITF Cairo, Egypt	25,000	Clay	(France) Audrey Bergot	6–3, 6–4
Loss	8–6	May 2010	ITF Jounieh Open, Lebanon	50,000	Clay	(Austria) Patricia Mayr-Achleitner	3–6, 7–6^{(7–3)}, 6–7^{(7–9)}
Win	9–6	Sep 2010	Internazionali di Biella, Italy	100,000	Clay	(Czech Republic) Zuzana Ondrášková	6–4, 6–2
Win	10–6	Sep 2010	ITF Zagreb, Croatia	25,000	Clay	(Poland) Magda Linette	6–1, 4–6, 6–4
Win	11–6	Nov 2010	ITF Přerov, Czech Republic	25,000	Clay (i)	(France) Claire Feuerstein	4–6, 6–3, 7–5
Loss	11–7	Apr 2011	ITF Pelham, United States	25,000	Clay	(New Zealand) Marina Erakovic	4–6, 6–2, 1–6
Loss	11–8	Sep 2011	ITF Foggia, Italy	25,000	Clay	(Argentina) Paula Ormaechea	4–6, 4–6
Loss	11–9	Aug 2012	ITF Prague, Czech Republic	25,000	Clay	(Poland) Katarzyna Kawa	4–6, 1–6
Win	12–9	Sep 2012	Royal Cup, Montenegro (2)	50,000	Clay	(Italy) Maria Elena Camerin	3–6, 6–2, 6–0
Win	13–9	Nov 2012	GB Pro-Series Loughborough, UK	10,000	Hard (i)	(Germany) Julia Kimmelmann	7–5, 6–7^{(6–8)}, 6–3
Win	14–9	Nov 2012	ITF Edgbaston, UK	10,000	Hard (i)	(United Kingdom) Harriet Dart	6–4, 6–2
Loss	14–10	Nov 2012	ITF Vendryně, Czech Republic	15,000	Hard (i)	(Czech Republic) Sandra Záhlavová	6–7^{(1–7)}, 0–6
Win	15–10	May 2013	ITF Caserta, Italy	25,000	Clay	(Brazil) Beatriz Haddad Maia	6–4, 6–1
Loss	15–11	Mar 2014	Open de Seine-et-Marne, France	50,000	Hard (i)	(France) Claire Feuerstein	2–6, 6–4, 4–6
Loss	15–12	Jun 2014	Internazionali di Brescia, Italy	25,000	Clay	(Belarus) Aliaksandra Sasnovich	4–6, 1–6
Loss	15–13	Oct 2014	ITF Goyang, Korea	25,000	Hard	(Poland) Magda Linette	3–6, 6–3, 3–6
Loss	15–14	Mar 2015	ITF Irapuato, Mexico	25,000	Hard	(United States) Alexa Glatch	2–6, 5–7

=== Doubles: 95 (59 titles, 36 runner-ups) ===
Result	W–L	Date	Tournament	Tier	Surface	Partner	Opponents	Score
Win	1–0	Apr 2001	ITF Quartu Sant'Elena, Italy	10,000	Clay	(Czech Republic) Pavlina Slitrová	(Ukraine) Yuliya Beygelzimer (Belarus) Evgenia Subbotina	6–3, 6–4
Loss	1–1	Nov 2001	ITF Mexico City	25,000	Hard	(Republic of Ireland) Kelly Liggan	(United States) Amanda Augustus (United States) Jennifer Russell	6–7^{(5–7)}, 6–2, 6–7^{(5–7)}
Loss	1–2	Jul 2002	ITF Louisville, United States	50,000	Hard	(Japan) Miho Saeki	(Japan) Nana Miyagi (Kazakhstan) Irina Selyutina	7–5, 1–6, 5–7
Loss	1–3	Dec 2002	ITF Průhonice, Czech Republic	25,000	Carpet	(Czech Republic) Libuše Průšová	(Czech Republic) Sandra Kleinová (Czech Republic) Ľubomíra Kurhajcová	6–7^{(12–14)}, 3–6
Loss	1–4	Jun 2003	Open de Marseille, France	50,000	Clay	(Romania) Andreea Ehritt-Vanc	(Ukraine) Yuliana Fedak (Russia) Galina Fokina	4–6, 7–6^{(7–3)}, 3–6
Win	2–4	Mar 2005	ITF Amiens, France	10,000	Clay	(Belarus) Tatsiana Kapshai	(Netherlands) Sanne van den Biggelaar (Netherlands) Suzanne van Hartingsveldt	2–6, 7–6^{(7–5)}, 6–4
Win	3–4	Jul 2005	ITF Vittel, France	50,000	Clay	(Czech Republic) Hana Šromová	(Slovakia) Stanislava Hrozenská (Czech Republic) Lenka Němečková	6–4, 6–4
Loss	3–5	Aug 2005	Ladies Open Hechingen, Germany	25,000	Clay	(Czech Republic) Sandra Záhlavová	(Germany) Kristina Barrois (Germany) Jasmin Wöhr	6–4, 6–7^{(3–7)}, 4–6
Loss	3–6	Aug 2005	ITF Kędzierzyn-Koźle, Poland	25,000	Clay	(Czech Republic) Sandra Záhlavová	(Poland) Agnieszka Radwańska (Poland) Urszula Radwańska	1–6, 4–6
Win	4–6	Oct 2005	Internazionali di Biella, Italy	50,000	Clay	(Czech Republic) Lucie Hradecká	(Estonia) Maret Ani (Bosnia and Herzegovina) Mervana Jugić-Salkić	6–4, 7–6^{(7–4)}
Win	5–6	Oct 2005	Open Nantes Atlantique, France	25,000	Hard	(France) Mailyne Andrieux	(Canada) Marie-Ève Pelletier (France) Aurélie Védy	6–7^{(3–7)}, 7–5, 6–2
Win	6–6	Nov 2005	ITF Le Havre, France	10,000	Clay (i)	(Czech Republic) Janette Bejlková	(France) Louise Doutrelant (France) Émilie Bacquet	6–3, 6–3
Win	7–6	Dec 2005	ITF Valašské Meziříčí, Czech Republic	25,000	Hard (i)	(Croatia) Darija Jurak	(Czech Republic) Sandra Záhlavová (Czech Republic) Lucie Hradecká	6–3, 6–3
Win	8–6	Jan 2006	ITF Stuttgart, Germany	10,000	Hard (i)	(Croatia) Darija Jurak	(France) Kildine Chevalier (France) Julie Coin	6–2, 6–1
Loss	8–7	Feb 2006	Biberach Open, Germany	25,000	Hard (i)	(Croatia) Darija Jurak	(Czech Republic) Lucie Hradecká (Czech Republic) Olga Vymetálková	6–2, 4–6, 6–7^{(4–7)}
Win	9–7	Apr 2006	ITF Poza Rica, Mexico	25,000	Hard	(Croatia) Matea Mezak	(Hungary) Zsófia Gubacsi (Hungary) Kyra Nagy	6–2, 1–0 ret.
Loss	9–8	May 2006	ITF Campobasso, Italy	25,000	Clay	(Russia) Elena Chalova	(Czech Republic) Nikola Fraňková (Russia) Alisa Kleybanova	w/o
Win	10–8	Jun 2006	ITF Galatina, Italy	25,000	Clay	(Montenegro) Danica Krstajić	(Hungary) Kyra Nagy (Italy) Valentina Sassi	6–4, 6–0
Win	11–8	Jun 2006	ITF Fontanafredda, Italy	25,000	Clay	(Czech Republic) Andrea Hlaváčková	(Austria) Daniela Klemenschits (Austria) Sandra Klemenschits	6–4, 6–4
Win	12–8	Jul 2006	ITF Padova, Italy	25,000	Clay	(Croatia) Darija Jurak	(Brazil) Larissa Carvalho (Slovenia) Andreja Klepač	6–4, 6–3
Win	13–8	Jul 2006	ITF Stuttgart, Germany	25,000	Clay	(Romania) Monica Niculescu	(Slovakia) Eva Fislová (Slovakia) Stanislava Hrozenská	6–2, 6–7^{(4–7)}, 7–5
Win	14–8	Sep 2006	Save Cup Mestre, Italy	50,000	Clay	(Romania) Monica Niculescu	(Georgia (country)) Margalita Chakhnashvili (Germany) Tatjana Malek	6–4, 3–6, 6–4
Win	15–8	Oct 2006	Internazionali di Biella, Italy (2)	50,000	Clay	(Czech Republic) Barbora Strýcová	(Czech Republic) Lucie Hradecká (Czech Republic) Michaela Paštiková	6–3, 6–2
Loss	15–9	Oct 2006	Open de Touraine, France	50,000	Hard	(Czech Republic) Barbora Strýcová	(Spain) María José Martínez Sánchez (France) Stéphanie Cohen-Aloro	5–7, 5–7
Win	16–9	Jun 2007	Zubr Cup Přerov, Czech Republic	75,000	Clay	(Czech Republic) Lucie Hradecká	(Paraguay) Rossana de los Ríos (United States) Edina Gallovits	5–7, 6–3, 6–2
Win	17–9	Jun 2007	Zlín Open, Czech Republic	50,000	Hard	(Czech Republic) Lucie Hradecká	(Czech Republic) Michaela Paštiková (Czech Republic) Hana Šromová	6–2, 2–6, 6–4
Loss	17–10	Jul 2007	Internazionali di Biella, Italy	100,000	Clay	(Bosnia and Herzegovina) Mervana Jugić-Salkić	(Estonia) Maret Ani (Estonia) Kaia Kanepi	4–6, 1–6
Win	18–10	Jul 2007	Contrexéville Open, France	50,000	Hard	(Czech Republic) Barbora Strýcová	(Belarus) Ekaterina Dzehalevich (Belarus) Ksenia Milevskaya	6–2, 6–2
Win	19–10	Oct 2007	Slovak Open, Slovakia	100,000+H	Clay	(Czech Republic) Barbora Strýcová	(Russia) Anastasia Rodionova (Ukraine) Olga Savchuk	6–4, 6–4
Win	20–10	Nov 2007	ITF Deauville, France	50,000	Clay	(Czech Republic) Barbora Strýcová	(Uzbekistan) Akgul Amanmuradova (Belarus) Anastasiya Yakimova	6–3, 7–5
Win	21–10	Mar 2008	Las Vegas Open, United States	50,000	Hard	(Hungary) Melinda Czink	(Chinese Taipei) Chan Chin-wei (United States) Tetiana Luzhanska	6–3, 6–2
Loss	21–11	Apr 2008	Open de Saint-Malo, France	100,000+H	Clay	(Belarus) Anastasiya Yakimova	(Spain) María José Martínez Sánchez (Spain) Arantxa Parra Santonja	2–6, 1–6
Win	22–11	May 2008	Open de Cagnes-sur-Mer, France	100,000+H	Clay	(Romania) Monica Niculescu	(France) Julie Coin (Canada) Marie-Ève Pelletier	6–7^{(2–7)}, 6–1, [10–5]
Loss	22–12	Jun 2008	Zlín Open, Czech Republic	75,000+H	Clay	(Czech Republic) Lucie Hradecká	(Czech Republic) Simona Dobrá (Czech Republic) Tereza Hladíková	4–6, 3–6
Win	23–12	Jul 2008	International Country Cuneo, Italy	100,000	Clay	(Estonia) Maret Ani	(Ukraine) Olga Savchuk (Russia) Marina Shamayko	6–1, 6–2
Win	24–12	Jul 2008	Internazionali di Biella, Italy (3)	100,000	Clay	(Czech Republic) Barbora Strýcová	(Spain) Lourdes Domínguez Lino (Spain) Arantxa Parra Santonja	4–6, 6–0, [10–5]
Win	25–12	Sep 2008	Sofia Cup, Bulgaria	100,000	Clay	(Estonia) Maret Ani	(Spain) Lourdes Domínguez Lino (Spain) Arantxa Parra Santonja	7–6^{(7–4)}, 7–6^{(11–9)}
Loss	25–13	Oct 2008	Open de Saint-Raphaël, France	50,000	Hard	(France) Gracia Radovanovic	(Czech Republic) Eva Birnerová (Czech Republic) Lucie Hradecká	4–6, 3–6
Win	26–13	Dec 2008	ITF Přerov, Czech Republic	25,000	Hard	(Czech Republic) Tereza Hladíková	(Russia) Ksenia Lykina (Czech Republic) Kateřina Vaňková	6–0, 3–6, [10–3]
Win	27–13	Feb 2009	ITF Sutton, United Kingdom	25,000	Hard	(United States) Raquel Atawo	(Canada) Rebecca Marino (United Kingdom) Katie O'Brien	6–3, 6–3
Win	28–13	Apr 2009	ITF Bari, Italy	25,000	Clay	(Ukraine) Irina Buryachok	(Sweden) Johanna Larsson (United Kingdom) Anna Smith	5–7, 6–2, [10–5]
Win	29–13	May 2009	Makarska International, Croatia	50,000	Clay	(Germany) Tatjana Malek	(Czech Republic) Tereza Hladíková (Poland) Karolina Kosińska	6–4, 5–7, [10–6]
Win	30–13	Jul 2009	Zagreb Ladies Open, Croatia	75,000+H	Clay	(Croatia) Darija Jurak	(Russia) Elena Chalova (Russia) Anastasia Poltoratskaya	6–2, 7–5
Loss	30–14	Sep 2009	Internazionali di Biella, Italy	100k	Clay	(Belarus) Darya Kustova	(Austria) Sandra Klemenschits (Czech Republic) Vladimíra Uhlířová	6–4, 3–6, [6–10]
Win	31–14	Oct 2009	Internacional de Madrid, Spain	50k	Clay	(Belarus) Darya Kustova	(Russia) Ekaterina Lopes (Australia) Arina Rodionova	6–2, 6–2
Loss	31–15	Nov 2009	ITF İstanbul, Turkey	25k	Hard	(Czech Republic) Petra Cetkovská	(Russia) Nina Bratchikova (Kyrgyzstan) Ksenia Palkina	w/o
Loss	31–16	Nov 2009	Open Nantes Atlantique, France	50k	Hard (i)	(Czech Republic) Vladimíra Uhlířová	(Czech Republic) Lucie Hradecká (Czech Republic) Michaela Pastikova	4–6, 4–6
Loss	31–17	Dec 2009	Dubai Challenge, UAE	75k	Hard	(Czech Republic) Vladimíra Uhlířová	(Germany) Julia Görges (Georgia (country)) Oksana Kalashnikova	6–4, 2–6, [8–10]
Win	32–17	Apr 2010	ITF Civitavecchia, Italy	25k	Clay	(Belarus) Darya Kustova	(Estonia) Maret Ani (Ukraine) Irina Buryachok	7–5, 7–5
Win	33–17	Apr 2010	ITF Cairo, Egypt	25k	Clay	(Czech Republic) Eva Birnerová	(Russia) Ksenia Milevskaya (Slovakia) Lenka Wienerová	7–6^{(7–4)}, 6–4
Win	34–17	May 2010	ITF Jounieh, Lebanon	50k+H	Clay	(Czech Republic) Petra Cetkovská	(Belarus) Ksenia Milevskaya (Ukraine) Lesia Tsurenko	6–4, 6–2
Win	35–17	Oct 2010	ITF Jounieh Open, Lebanon	100k+H	Clay	(Czech Republic) Petra Cetkovská	(Czech Republic) Eva Birnerová (Slovenia) Andreja Klepac	7–5, 6–2
Win	36–17	Oct 2010	Internationaux de Poitiers, France	100k	Hard	(Czech Republic) Lucie Hradecká	(Uzbekistan) Akgul Amanmuradova (Germany) Kristina Barrois	6–7^{(5–7)}, 6–2, [10–5]
Loss	36–18	May 2011	Open de Cagnes-sur-Mer, France	100k+H	Clay	(Croatia) Darija Jurak	(Germany) Anna-Lena Grönefeld (Croatia) Petra Martić	6–1, 2–6, [9–11]
Win	37–18	Jul 2011	ITS Cup Olomouc, Czech Republic	50k	Clay	(Netherlands) Michaëlla Krajicek	(Ukraine) Yuliya Beygelzimer (Romania) Elena Bogdan	7–5, 6–4
Win	38–18	Aug 2011	Empire Slovak Open, Slovakia	50k	Clay	(Slovakia) Janette Husárová	(Slovakia) Jana Čepelová (Slovakia) Lenka Wienerova	7–6^{(7–2)}, 6–1
Loss	38–19	Sep 2011	Internazionali di Biella, Italy	100k	Clay	(Slovakia) Janette Husárová	(Spain) Lara Arruabarrena (Russia) Ekaterina Lopes	3–6, 6–0, [3–10]
Win	39–19	Sep 2011	ITF Foggia, Italy	25k	Clay	(Slovakia) Janette Husárová	(Spain) Leticia Costas (Spain) Inés Ferrer Suárez	6–1, 6–2
Loss	39–20	May 2012	Open de Cagnes-sur-Mer, France	100k+H	Clay	(Hungary) Katalin Marosi	(Russia) Alexandra Panova (Poland) Urszula Radwańska	5–7, 6–4, [6–10]
Win	40–20	May 2012	ITF Casablanca, Morocco	25k	Clay	(Ukraine) Olga Savchuk	(Romania) Elena Bogdan (Romania) Raluca Olaru	6–1, 6–4
Win	41–20	Jun 2012	ITF Craiova, Romania	50k+H	Clay	(Slovakia) Lenka Wienerová	(Poland) Paula Kania (Russia) Irina Khromacheva	2–6, 6–3, [10–6]
Win	42–20	Jul 2012	Contrexéville Open, France (2)	50k	Clay	(Ukraine) Yuliya Beygelzimer	(Croatia) Tereza Mrdeža (Croatia) Silvia Njirić	6–1, 6–1
Loss	42–21	Jul 2012	ITS Cup Olomouc, Czech Republic	100k	Clay	(Ukraine) Yuliya Beygelzimer	(Spain) Inés Ferrer Suárez (Netherlands) Richèl Hogenkamp	2–6, 6–7^{(4–7)}
Win	43–21	Aug 2012	Empire Slovak Open (2)	50k	Clay	(Romania) Elena Bogdan	(Poland) Marta Domachowska (Austria) Sandra Klemenschits	7–6^{(7–2)}, 6–4
Loss	43–22	Aug 2012	Ladies Open Hechingen, Germany	25k	Clay	(Russia) Natela Dzalamidze	(Bosnia and Herzegovina) Mervana Jugić-Salkić (Switzerland) Sandra Klemenschits	2–6, 3–6
Loss	43–23	Nov 2012	Open Nantes Atlantique, France	50k+H	Hard	(Czech Republic) Petra Cetkovská	(Colombia) Catalina Castaño (Bosnia and Herzegovina) Mervana Jugić-Salkić	4–6, 4–6
Win	44–23	Feb 2013	Open de l'Isère, France	25k	Hard	(Russia) Maria Kondratieva	(Italy) Nicole Clerico (Spain) Leticia Costas	6–1, 6–4
Win	45–23	May 2013	ITF Civitavecchia, Italy (2)	25k	Clay	(Liechtenstein) Stephanie Vogt	(Poland) Paula Kania (Poland) Magda Linette	6–3, 6–4
Win	46–23	May 2013	Empire Slovak Open (3)	75k	Clay	(Bosnia and Herzegovina) Mervana Jugić-Salkić	(Slovakia) Jana Čepelová (Slovakia) Anna Karolína Schmiedlová	6–1, 6–1
Win	47–23	May 2013	Prague Open, Czech Republic	100k	Clay	(Czech Republic) Barbora Strýcová	(United States) Irina Falconi (Czech Republic) Eva Hrdinová	6–4, 6–0
Win	48–23	May 2013	ITF Caserta, Italy	25k	Clay	(Montenegro) Danka Kovinić	(Romania) Elena Bogdan (Romania) Cristina Dinu	6–4, 7–6^{(7–3)}
Win	49–23	Jun 2013	Open de Montpellier, France	25k	Clay	(Russia) Irina Khromacheva	(Spain) Inés Ferrer Suárez (Brazil) Paula Cristina Gonçalves	6–1, 6–4
Loss	49–24	Jul 2013	Reinert Open, Germany	50k	Clay	(France) Claire Feuerstein	(Georgia (country)) Sofia Shapatava (United States) Anna Tatishvili	4–6, 4–6
Win	50–24	Jul 2013	ITS Cup Olomouc, Czech Republic (2)	100k	Clay	(Czech Republic) Barbora Strýcová	(Czech Republic) Martina Borecká (Czech Republic) Tereza Maliková	6–3, 6–4
Win	51–24	Aug 2013	Donetsk Cup, Ukraine	75k	Hard	(Ukraine) Yuliya Beygelzimer	(Serbia) Vesna Dolonc (Russia) Alexandra Panova	6–1, 6–4
Loss	51–25	Feb 2014	Nottingham Trophy, UK	25k	Hard	(United Kingdom) Naomi Broady	(United Kingdom) Jocelyn Rae (United Kingdom) Anna Smith	6–7^{(6–8)}, 4–6
Win	52–25	Jul 2014	ITS Cup Olomouc, Czech Republic (3)	50k	Clay	(Czech Republic) Petra Cetkovská	(Czech Republic) Barbora Krejčíková (Serbia) Aleksandra Krunić	6–2, 4–6, [10–7]
Win	53–25	Aug 2014	ITF Plzen, Czech Republic	25k	Clay	(Austria) Sandra Klemenschits	(Belarus) Lidziya Marozava (Ukraine) Anastasiya Vasylyeva	6–4, 7–5
Win	54–25	Jun 2015	Internazionali di Brescia, Italy	50k	Clay	(Germany) Laura Siegemund	(Argentina) María Irigoyen (Liechtenstein) Stephanie Vogt	6–2, 6–1
Loss	54–26	Jun 2015	Open de Montpellier, France	50k+H	Clay	(Germany) Laura Siegemund	(Argentina) Maria Irigoyen (Czech Republic) Barbora Krejčíková	4–6, 2–6
Loss	54–27	Nov 2015	Open Nantes Atlantique, France	50k	Hard	(Czech Republic) Kateřina Siniaková	(Czech Republic) Lenka Jara (Czech Republic) Karolína Stuchlá	4–6, 2–6
Win	55–27	May 2016	Open Saint Gaudens, France	50k+H	Clay	(Netherlands) Demi Schuurs	(Germany) Nicola Geuer (Switzerland) Viktorija Golubic	6–1, 6–2
Loss	55–28	Jul 2016	Contrexéville Open, France	100k	Clay	(United States) Nicole Melichar	(Netherlands) Cindy Burger (Spain) Laura Pous Tió	1–6, 3–6
Win	56–28	Jul 2016	ITF Prague Open, Czech Republic	75k	Clay	(Netherlands) Demi Schuurs	(Spain) Sílvia Soler Espinosa (Spain) Sara Sorribes Tormo	7–5, 3–6, [10–4]
Loss	56–29	May 2017	Open de Cagnes-sur-Mer, France	100k	Clay	(Romania) Raluca Olaru	(Chinese Taipei) Chang Kai-chen (Chinese Taipei) Hsieh Su-wei	5–7, 1–6
Loss	56–30	May 2017	Empire Slovak Open	100k	Clay	(Chinese Taipei) Chuang Chia-jung	(United Kingdom) Naomi Broady (United Kingdom) Heather Watson	3–6, 2–6
Win	57–30	Jan 2019	Open Andrézieux-Bouthéon, France	W60	Hard	(Sweden) Cornelia Lister	(Romania) Andreea Mitu (Romania) Elena-Gabriela Ruse	6–1, 6–2
Loss	57–31	Mar 2019	ITF Irapuato, Mexico	W25+H	Hard	(Paraguay) Verónica Cepede Royg	(New Zealand) Paige Hourigan (Australia) Astra Sharma	1–6, 6–4, [10–12]
Loss	57–32	May 2019	Empire Slovak Open (4)	W100	Clay	(Sweden) Cornelia Lister	(Russia) Anna Blinkova (Switzerland) Xenia Knoll	7–5, 7–5
Loss	57–33	Oct 2022	Internationaux de Poitiers, France	W80	Hard (i)	(France) Jessika Ponchet	(Czech Republic) Miriam Kolodziejová (Czech Republic) Markéta Vondroušová	4–6, 3–6
Loss	57–34	Nov 2022	GB Pro-Series Shrewsbury, UK	W100	Hard (i)	(France) Jessika Ponchet	(Czech Republic) Miriam Kolodziejová (Czech Republic) Markéta Vondroušová	6–7^{(4–7)}, 2–6
Win	58–34	Nov 2022	Slovak Open, Slovakia	W60	Hard (i)	(Czech Republic) Jesika Malečková	(Slovakia) Katarína Kužmová (Slovakia) Viktória Kužmová	2–6, 7–5, [13–11]
Loss	58–35	Apr 2023	Oeiras Ladies Open, Portugal	W60	Clay	(Czech Republic) Jesika Malečková	(Brazil) Ingrid Martins (Mexico) Fernanda Contreras Gómez	3–6, 2–6
Loss	58–36	May 2024	ITF Villach, Austria	W35	Clay	(Czech Republic) Karolína Kubáňová	(Czech Republic) Aneta Kučmová (Slovenia) Nika Radišić	1–6, 4–6
Win	59–36	Jun 2024	ITF Gdansk, Poland	W35	Clay	(Czech Republic) Karolína Kubáňová	(Australia) Jaimee Fourlis (Australia) Petra Hule	3–6, 7–6^{(7–5)}, [10–7]

== ITF Junior Circuit ==
=== Junior Grand Slam finals ===
==== Doubles: 1 (title) ====
Result	Year	Tournament	Surface	Partner	Opponents	Score
Win	2001	French Open	Clay	(Czech Republic) Petra Cetkovská	(Haiti) Neyssa Etienne (Germany) Annette Kolb	6–3, 3–6, 6–3
