= Ekaterina Lopes =

Russian tennis player (born 1987)

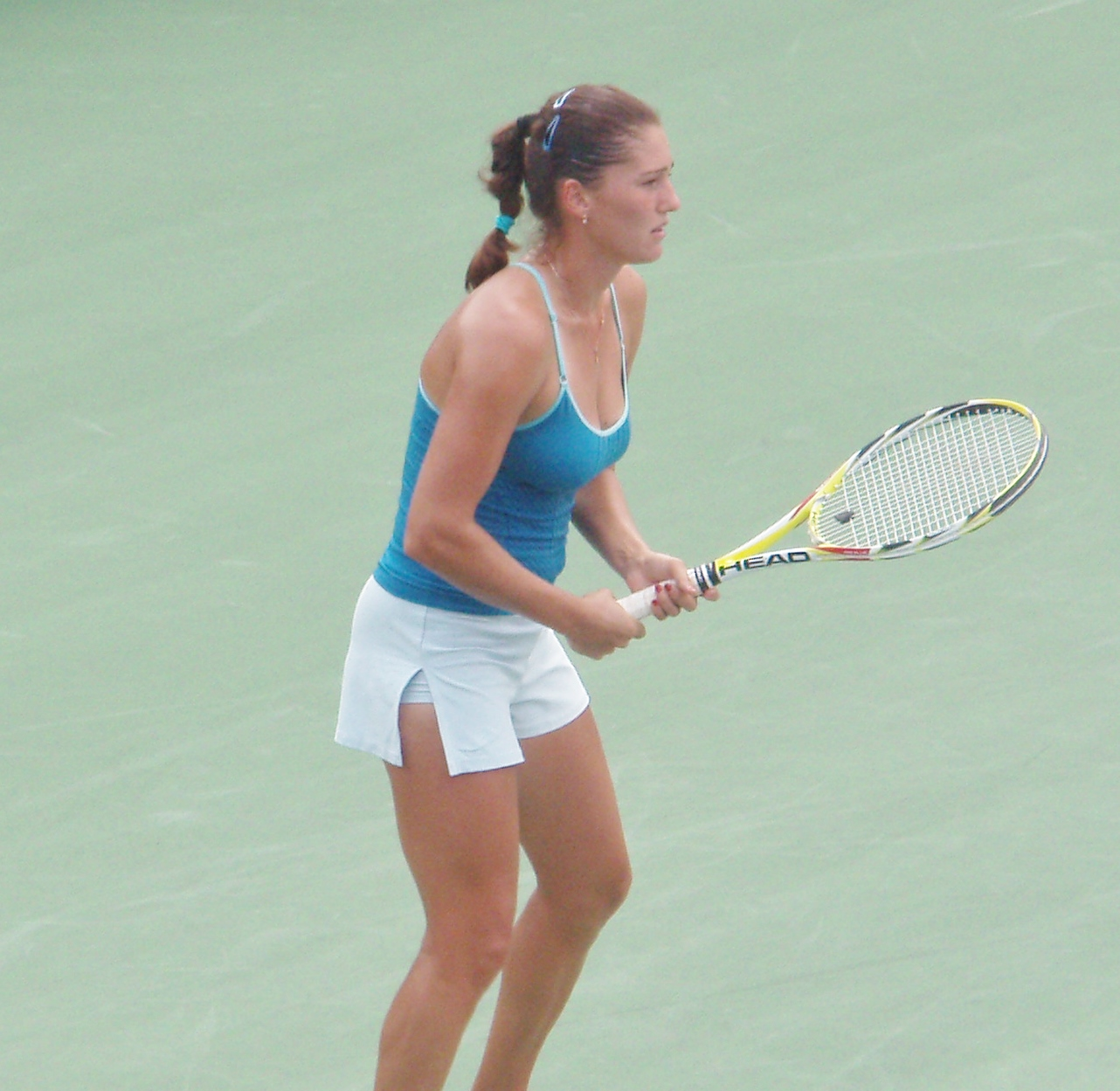
- Country (sports): Russia
- Born: 18 December 1987 (age 37); Moscow, Russia
- Plays: Right-handed (two-handed backhand)
- Prize money: $371,100

Singles
- Career record: 315–228
- Career titles: 5 ITF
- Highest ranking: No. 136 (24 August 2009)

Grand Slam singles results
- Australian Open: 1R (2008)
- French Open: 1R (2010)
- Wimbledon: Q3 (2010,2011)
- US Open: Q2 (2007)

Doubles
- Career record: 127–137
- Career titles: 11 ITF
- Highest ranking: No. 142 (16 January 2012)

Ekaterina Lopes (née Ivanova; born 18 December 1987) is a Russian former tennis player.

Her highest WTA rankings are 136 in singles, which she reached in June 2009, and 142 in doubles, set in January 2012. Her strongest showing in a tour event was reaching the quarterfinal of the Barcelona Ladies Open in 2008 as a qualifier.

On 18 October 2011, at the Kremlin Cup, Lopes defeated world No. 13, Jelena Janković, 6–4, 1–6, 6–4.

== ITF finals ==
=== Singles: 10 (5 titles, 5 runner-ups) ===
Legend $100,000 tournaments $75,000 tournaments $50,000 tournaments $25,000 tournaments $10,000 tournaments	Finals by surface Hard (1–0) Clay (4–5)

Outcome	No.	Date	Tournament	Surface	Opponent	Score
Runner-up	1.	25 July 2004	ITF Ancona, Italy	Clay	(Croatia) Sanja Ančić	2–6, 1–6
Winner	1.	26 June 2005	ITF Bucharest, Romania	Clay	(Romania) Corina Corduneanu	4–6, 6–3, 7–5
Runner-up	2.	8 October 2006	ITF Barcelona, Spain	Clay	(Italy) Tathiana Garbin	3–6, 5–7
Winner	2.	21 September 2008	Save Cup, Italy	Clay	(Switzerland) Romina Oprandi	6–3, 3–0 ret.
Winner	3.	7 June 2009	ITF Brno, Czech Republic	Clay	(Czech Republic) Sandra Záhlavová	6–0, 6–3
Runner-up	3.	8 August 2009	ITF Moscow, Russia	Clay	(Russia) Ksenia Pervak	6–4, 4–6, 2–6
Runner-up	4.	15 August 2009	ITF Moscow, Russia	Clay	(Russia) Ksenia Pervak	0–6, 2–6
Runner-up	5.	5 June 2011	Internazionali di Roma, Italy	Clay	(United States) Christina McHale	2–6, 4–6
Winner	4.	23 February 2014	ITF Palma Nova, Spain	Clay	(Portugal) Bárbara Luz	6–4, 6–2
Winner	5.	16 March 2014	ITF Ponta Delgada, Portugal	Hard	(Portugal) Bárbara Luz	6–4, 6–2

=== Doubles: 24 (11 titles, 13 runner-ups) ===
Result	No.	Date	Tournament	Surface	Partner	Opponents	Score
Loss	1.	25 June 2005	ITF Bucharest, Romania	Clay	(Russia) Elena Chalova	(Romania) Corina Corduneanu (Romania) Gabriela Niculescu	2–6, 4–6
Loss	2.	10 July 2005	ITF Krasnoarmeysk, Russia	Hard	(Russia) Elena Chalova	(Russia) Anna Bastrikova (Russia) Julia Efremova	2–6, 6–7
Win	1.	13 August 2005	ITF Moscow, Russia	Clay	(Russia) Olga Panova	(Russia) Anna Bastrikova (Russia) Vasilisa Davydova	7–5, 6–3
Loss	3.	4 September 2005	ITF Balashikha, Russia	Clay	(Russia) Olga Panova	(Russia) Anna Bastrikova (Russia) Nina Bratchikova	2–6, 2–6
Loss	4.	4 February 2006	ITF Belfort, France	Hard (i)	(Latvia) Irina Kuzmina	(Germany) Kristina Barrois (Germany) Kathrin Wörle	1–6, 1–6
Loss	5.	10 February 2006	ITF Capriolo, Italy	Carpet (i)	(Georgia (country)) Margalita Chakhnashvili	(Belarus) Darya Kustova (Russia) Ekaterina Makarova	2–6, 4–6
Loss	6.	18 August 2006	ITF Rimini, Italy	Clay	(Belarus) Ekaterina Dzehalevich	(Bosnia and Herzegovina) Mervana Jugić-Salkić (Czech Republic) Gabriela Chmelinová	3–6, 6–1, 2–6
Win	2.	22 September 2006	ITF Lecce, Italy	Clay	(Serbia) Teodora Mirčić	(France) Kildine Chevalier (Italy) Adriana Serra Zanetti	7–6^{(4)}, 6–4
Loss	7.	15 April 2007	Open de Biarritz, France	Clay	(France) Iryna Brémond	(Russia) Evgeniya Rodina (Israel) Yevgenia Savransky	6–2, 1–6, 3–6
Win	3.	28 April 2007	ITF Torrent, Spain	Clay	(Russia) Evgeniya Rodina	(Spain) Marta Marrero (Spain) Carla Suárez Navarro	7–6^{(7)}, 3–6, 6–2
Loss	8.	10 November 2007	ITF Minsk, Belarus	Hard (i)	(Russia) Vesna Manasieva	(Russia) Alla Kudryavtseva (Russia) Anastasia Pavlyuchenkova	0–6, 2–6
Win	4.	22 February 2009	ITF Surprise, United States	Hard	(Argentina) Jorgelina Cravero	(United States) Ahsha Rolle (Belgium) Yanina Wickmayer	6–1, 6–1
Loss	9.	28 March 2009	ITF Latina, Italy	Clay	(Russia) Marina Shamayko	(Hungary) Katalin Marosi (Brazil) Marina Tavares	2–6, 0–6
Win	5.	7 August 2009	ITF Moscow, Russia	Clay	(Australia) Arina Rodionova	(Ukraine) Veronika Kapshay (Austria) Melanie Klaffner	6–2, 6–2
Win	6.	14 August 2009	ITF Moscow, Russia	Clay	(Australia) Arina Rodionova	(Russia) Valeria Savinykh (Russia) Marina Shamayko	6–3, 6–3
Loss	10.	17 October 2009	ITF Madrid, Spain	Clay	(Australia) Arina Rodionova	(Belarus) Darya Kustova (Czech Republic) Renata Voráčová	2–6, 2–6
Win	7.	18 July 2010	Contrexéville Open, France	Clay	(Russia) Nina Bratchikova	(Australia) Jelena Dokic (Canada) Sharon Fichman	6–4, 4–6, [10–3]
Win	8.	7 August 2010	Tatarstan Open, Kazakhstan	Hard	(Russia) Nina Bratchikova	(Ukraine) Yuliana Fedak (Ukraine) Anastasiya Vasylyeva	6–4, 6–4
Loss	11.	11 February 2011	ITF Cali, Colombia	Clay	(Germany) Kathrin Wörle	(Romania) Irina-Camelia Begu (Romania) Elena Bogdan	6–2, 6–7^{(6)}, [9–11]
Win	9.	28 May 2011	Grado Tennis Cup, Italy	Clay	(Argentina) María Irigoyen	(China) Liu Wanting (China) Sun Shengnan	6–3, 6–0
Win	10.	12 August 2011	ITF Kazan, Russia	Hard	(Slovenia) Andreja Klepač	(Russia) Vitalia Diatchenko (Russia) Alexandra Panova	w/o
Win	11.	10 September 2011	Internazionali di Biella, Italy	Clay	(Spain) Lara Arruabarrena	(Slovakia) Janette Husárová (Czech Republic) Renata Voráčová	6–3, 0–6, [10–3]
Loss	12.	2 October 2011	ITF Clermont-Ferrand, France	Hard (i)	(Russia) Ksenia Lykina	(Bosnia and Herzegovina) Mervana Jugić-Salkić (United Kingdom) Anne Keothavong	6–4, 3–6, [8–10]
Loss	13.	13 November 2011	ITF Benicarlo, Spain	Clay	(Bulgaria) Aleksandrina Naydenova	(Spain) Inés Ferrer Suárez (Netherlands) Richèl Hogenkamp	6–7^{(6)}, 4–6
