= 2011 Save Cup =

- Date: 12–18 September
- Edition: 9th
- Location: Mestre, Italy

Champions

Singles
- (Germany) Mona Barthel

Doubles
- (Ukraine) Valentyna Ivakhnenko / (Russia) Marina Melnikova
- Save Cup

The 2011 Save Cup was a professional tennis tournament played on clay courts. It was the ninth edition of the tournament which is part of the 2011 ITF Women's Circuit. It took place in Mestre, Italy between 12 and 18 September 2011.

== WTA entrants ==
=== Seeds ===
Country	Player	Rank^{1}	Seed
GER	Mona Barthel	99	1
CZE	Renata Voráčová	128	2
CZE	Sandra Záhlavová	136	3
RUS	Ekaterina Ivanova	168	4
HUN	Tímea Babos	190	5
ITA	Anna Floris	192	6
CAN	Heidi El Tabakh	200	7
GEO	Margalita Chakhnashvili	214	8

- ^{1} Rankings are as of August 29, 2011.

=== Other entrants ===
The following players received wildcards into the singles main draw:

- (Italy) Evelyn Mayr
- (Croatia) Tereza Mrdeža
- (Italy) Federica Quercia
- (Italy) Camilla Rosatello

The following players received entry from the qualifying draw:

- (Italy) Federica di Sarra
- (Czech Republic) Simona Dobrá
- (Latvia) Diāna Marcinkēviča
- (Italy) Agnese Zucchini

== Champions ==
=== Singles ===
(Germany) Mona Barthel def. (Spain) Garbiñe Muguruza Blanco, 7–5, 6–2

=== Doubles ===
(Ukraine) Valentyna Ivakhnenko / (Russia) Marina Melnikova def. (Hungary) Tímea Babos / (Poland) Magda Linette, 6–4, 7–5
