= 2012 Save Cup =

Tennis tournament

- Date: 3–10 September
- Edition: 10th
- Location: Mestre, Italy

Champions

Singles
- (Italy) Karin Knapp

Doubles
- (Argentina) Mailen Auroux / (Argentina) María Irigoyen
- Save Cup

The 2012 Save Cup was a professional tennis tournament played on clay courts. It was the tenth edition of the tournament which is part of the 2012 ITF Women's Circuit. It took place in Mestre, Italy between 3 and 10 September 2012.

== WTA entrants ==
=== Seeds ===
Country	Player	Rank^{1}	Seed
USA	Julia Cohen	101	1
ITA	Karin Knapp	129	2
ITA	Alberta Brianti	132	3
AUT	Yvonne Meusburger	137	4
ESP	Estrella Cabeza Candela	145	5
ITA	Nastassja Burnett	153	6
LAT	Anastasija Sevastova	162	7
POL	Marta Domachowska	180	8

- ^{1} Rankings are as of August 27, 2012.

=== Other entrants ===
The following players received wildcards into the singles main draw:

- (Italy) Giulia Bruschi
- (Italy) Julia Mayr
- (Colombia) Yuliana Lizarazo
- (Italy) Anna Remondina

The following players received entry from the qualifying draw:

- (Switzerland) Timea Bacsinszky
- (Russia) Marina Melnikova
- (Serbia) Teodora Mirčić
- (Germany) Anne Schäfer

The following players received entry by a lucky loser spot:

- (Slovenia) Maša Zec-Peškirič

== Champions ==
=== Singles ===
- (Italy) Karin Knapp def. (Spain) Estrella Cabeza Candela, 6–1, 3–6, 6–1

=== Doubles ===
- (Argentina) Mailen Auroux / (Argentina) María Irigoyen def. (Hungary) Réka-Luca Jani / (Serbia) Teodora Mirčić, 5–7, 6–4, [10–8]
