= 2013 Save Cup =

- Date: 2–8 September
- Edition: 11th
- Draw: 32S/16D
- Prize money: $50,000
- Surface: Clay
- Location: Mestre, Italy

Champions

Singles
- (France) Claire Feuerstein

Doubles
- (France) Laura Thorpe / (Liechtenstein) Stephanie Vogt
- Save Cup

The 2013 Save Cup was a professional tennis tournament played on outdoor clay courts. It was the eleventh edition of the tournament which was part of the 2013 ITF Women's Circuit, offering a total of $50,000 in prize money. It took place in Mestre, Italy, on 2–8 September 2013.

== WTA entrants ==
=== Seeds ===
| Country | Player | Rank^{1} | Seed |
|---|---|---|---|
| ESP | Estrella Cabeza Candela | 102 | 1 |
| LIE | Stephanie Vogt | 145 | 2 |
| FRA | Claire Feuerstein | 147 | 3 |
| AUT | Melanie Klaffner | 179 | 4 |
| ITA | Maria Elena Camerin | 198 | 5 |
| GER | Anne Schäfer | 200 | 6 |
| ESP | Arantxa Parra Santonja | 202 | 7 |
| ROU | Cristina Dinu | 207 | 8 |

- ^{1} Rankings as of 26 August 2013

=== Other entrants ===
The following players received wildcards into the singles main draw:

- (Italy) Martina Caregaro
- (Italy) Deborah Chiesa
- (Colombia) Yuliana Lizarazo
- (Italy) Anna Remondina

The following players received entry from the qualifying draw:

- (Hungary) Ágnes Bukta
- (Slovenia) Nastja Kolar
- (Slovakia) Zuzana Luknárová
- (Greece) Despina Papamichail

== Champions ==
=== Singles ===
- (France) Claire Feuerstein def. (Slovenia) Nastja Kolar 6–1, 7–6^{(7–2)}

=== Doubles ===
- (France) Laura Thorpe / (Liechtenstein) Stephanie Vogt def. (Czech Republic) Petra Krejsová / (Czech Republic) Tereza Smitková 7–6^{(7–5)}, 7–5
