= 2012 Save Cup – Singles =

Singles
- 2012 Save Cup

Final
- Champion: (Italy) Karin Knapp
- Runner-up: (Spain) Estrella Cabeza Candela
- Score: 6–1, 3–6, 6–1

Events
Singles	Doubles
← 2011 ·	Save Cup	· 2013 →

Mona Barthel was the defending champion, but chose to participate at the 2012 US Open Grand Slam instead.

Karin Knapp won the title, defeating Estrella Cabeza Candela in the final, 6–1, 3–6, 6–1.

== Seeds ==
1. (United States) Julia Cohen (first round)
2. (Italy) Karin Knapp (champion)
3. (Italy) Alberta Brianti (first round, retired)
4. (Austria) Yvonne Meusburger (quarterfinals)
5. (Spain) Estrella Cabeza Candela (final)
6. (Italy) Nastassja Burnett (second round)
7. (Latvia) Anastasija Sevastova (second round)
8. (Poland) Marta Domachowska (second round)

== Main draw ==
=== Key ===
- Q = Qualifier
- WC = Wild card
- LL = Lucky loser
- Alt = Alternate
- SE = Special exempt
- PR = Protected ranking
- ITF = ITF entry
- JE = Junior exempt
- w/o = Walkover
- r = Retired
- d = Defaulted
- SR = Special ranking

=== Finals ===
Semifinals
(France) Séverine Beltrame	5	3
5	(Spain) Estrella Cabeza Candela	7	6
Q	(Switzerland) Timea Bacsinszky	5	0
2	(Italy) Karin Knapp	7	6

Final
5	(Spain) Estrella Cabeza Candela	1	6	1
2	(Italy) Karin Knapp	6	3	6

=== Top half ===
First round
1	(United States) J Cohen	0	3
(Slovakia) AK Schmiedlová	6	6
(Italy) A Floris	2	0
(Bulgaria) D Evtimova	6	6
(France) L Thorpe	3	3
(France) S Beltrame	6	6
WC	(Italy) J Mayr	6^{2}	6^{4}
6	(Italy) N Burnett	7^{7}	7^{7}
4	(Austria) Y Meusburger	7	3	6
(Argentina) M Auroux	5	6	2
(Netherlands) R Hogenkamp	6	6
(Georgia (country)) S Shapatava	4	2
(Romania) C Mitu	3	2
(Spain) I Ferrer Suárez	6	6
(Italy) ME Camerin	2	2
5	(Spain) E Cabeza Candela	6	6

Second round
(Slovakia) AK Schmiedlová	7	6
(Bulgaria) D Evtimova	5	3
(France) S Beltrame	6	6
6	(Italy) N Burnett	2	1
4	(Austria) Y Meusburger	6	6
(Netherlands) R Hogenkamp	1	1
(Spain) I Ferrer Suárez	6	2	3
5	(Spain) E Cabeza Candela	4	6	6

Quarterfinals
(Slovakia) AK Schmiedlová	1	2
(France) S Beltrame	6	6
4	(Austria) Y Meusburger	6^{4}	5
5	(Spain) E Cabeza Candela	7^{7}	7

Semifinals
(France) S Beltrame	5	3
5	(Spain) E Cabeza Candela	7	6

=== Bottom half ===
First round
7	(Latvia) A Sevastova	6	6
(Argentina) M Irigoyen	2	2
Q	(Serbia) T Mirčić	5	2
(Croatia) T Mrdeža	7	6
Q	(Switzerland) T Bacsinszky	6	6
(Bulgaria) E Kostova	1	1
WC	(Colombia) Y Lizarazo	6	2
3	(Italy) A Brianti	3	0^{r}
8	(Poland) M Domachowska	6	6
WC	(Italy) G Bruschi	1	0
(Hungary) R-L Jani	7^{9}	1	6^{3}
Q	(Germany) A Schäfer	6^{7}	6	7^{7}
Q	(Russia) M Melnikova	6	0	4
WC	(Italy) A Remondina	3	6	6
LL	(Slovenia) M Zec-Peškirič	3	0
2	(Italy) K Knapp	6	6

Second round
7	(Latvia) A Sevastova	3	4
(Croatia) T Mrdeža	6	6
Q	(Switzerland) T Bacsinszky	6	7
WC	(Colombia) Y Lizarazo	1	5
8	(Poland) M Domachowska	2	3
Q	(Germany) A Schäfer	6	6
WC	(Italy) A Remondina	3	3
2	(Italy) K Knapp	6	6

Quarterfinals
(Croatia) T Mrdeža	0	6^{2}
Q	(Switzerland) T Bacsinszky	6	7^{7}
Q	(Germany) A Schäfer	3	2
2	(Italy) K Knapp	6	6

Semifinals
Q	(Switzerland) T Bacsinszky	5	0
2	(Italy) K Knapp	6	6
