= Koddaert Ladies Open =

Defunct tennis tournament
- Event name: Torhout
- Location: Torhout, Belgium
- Category: ITF Women's Circuit
- Surface: Hard (indoor)
- Draw: 32S/32Q/16D
- Prize money: $100,000+H

The Koddaert Ladies Open was a tournament for professional female tennis players played on indoor hard courts. The event was classified as a $100,000+H ITF Women's Circuit tournament and was held in Torhout, Belgium, from 2007 to 2010. In 2010, two editions of the tournament were held, with the April-held tournament named the Telenet Open.

== Past finals ==
=== Singles ===
Year	Champion	Runner-up	Score
2010^{(2)}	(Belgium) Yanina Wickmayer	(Romania) Simona Halep	6–3, 6–2
2010^{(1)}	(Germany) Mona Barthel	(Canada) Rebecca Marino	2–6, 6–4, 6–2
2009	(Croatia) Karolina Šprem	(Ukraine) Viktoria Kutuzova	6–1, 6–4
2008	(United Kingdom) Elena Baltacha	(Czech Republic) Iveta Benešová	6–7^{(5–7)}, 6–1, 6–4
2007	(France) Claire Feuerstein	(Belgium) Yanina Wickmayer	6–4, 6–4

=== Doubles ===
Year	Champions	Runners-up	Score
2010^{(2)}	(Switzerland) Timea Bacsinszky (Italy) Tathiana Garbin	(Netherlands) Michaëlla Krajicek (Belgium) Yanina Wickmayer	6–4, 6–2
2010^{(1)}	(Germany) Mona Barthel (Germany) Justine Ozga	(Czech Republic) Hana Birnerová (Russia) Ekaterina Bychkova	7–5, 6–2
2009	(Netherlands) Michaëlla Krajicek (Belgium) Yanina Wickmayer	(Germany) Julia Görges (Austria) Sandra Klemenschits	6–4, 6–0
2008	(Russia) Anastasia Pavlyuchenkova (Belgium) Yanina Wickmayer	(France) Stéphanie Cohen-Aloro (Tunisia) Selima Sfar	6–4, 4–6, [10–8]
2007	(Slovakia) Martina Babáková (Netherlands) Kika Hogendoorn	(Italy) Elena Pioppo (Italy) Verdiana Verardi	7–6^{(7–2)}, 6–3
