= 2011 Save Cup – Doubles =

Doubles
- 2011 Save Cup

Final
- Champions: (Ukraine) Valentyna Ivakhnenko (Russia) Marina Melnikova
- Runners-up: (Hungary) Tímea Babos (Poland) Magda Linette
- Score: 6–4, 7–5

Events
Singles	Doubles
← 2010 ·	Save Cup	· 2012 →

Claudia Giovine and Karin Knapp were the defending champions, but both chose not to participate.
Valentyna Ivakhnenko and Marina Melnikova won the title, defeating Tímea Babos and Magda Linette 6–4, 7–5 in the final.

== Seeds ==
1. (Ukraine) Irina Buryachok / (Romania) Liana Ungur (semifinals)
2. (Hungary) Tímea Babos / (Poland) Magda Linette (final)
3. (Italy) Evelyn Mayr / (Italy) Julia Mayr (quarterfinals)
4. (Canada) Heidi El Tabakh / (Russia) Ekaterina Ivanova (quarterfinals)

== Draw ==
=== Key ===
- Q = Qualifier
- WC = Wild card
- LL = Lucky loser
- Alt = Alternate
- SE = Special exempt
- PR = Protected ranking
- ITF = ITF entry
- JE = Junior exempt
- w/o = Walkover
- r = Retired
- d = Defaulted
- SR = Special ranking

=== Draw ===
First round
(Ukraine) V Ivakhnenko (Russia) M Melnikova	6	6
(Latvia) D Marcinkēviča (Italy) C Rosatello	3	2
(Italy) A Moratelli (Italy) A Remondina	2	1
(Slovakia) J Husárová (Czech Republic) R Voráčová	6	6
(Italy) G Gatto-Monticone (Italy) F Quercia	5	6	[11]
(Spain) E Fernández-Brugués (Italy) A Văideanu	7	2	[9]

Quarterfinals
1	(Ukraine) I Buryachok (Romania) L Ungur	6^{4}	6	[10]
(Italy) G Barbieri (Slovakia) Z Luknárová	7^{7}	2	[7]
4	(Canada) H El Tabakh (Russia) E Ivanova	3	5
(Ukraine) V Ivakhnenko (Russia) M Melnikova	6	7
(Slovakia) J Husárová (Czech Republic) R Voráčová	6	6
3	(Italy) E Mayr (Italy) J Mayr	4	2
(Italy) G Gatto-Monticone (Italy) F Quercia	4	3
2	(Hungary) T Babos (Poland) M Linette	6	6

Semifinals
1	(Ukraine) I Buryachok (Romania) L Ungur	1	1
(Ukraine) V Ivakhnenko (Russia) M Melnikova	6	6
(Slovakia) J Husárová (Czech Republic) R Voráčová	3	2
2	(Hungary) T Babos (Poland) M Linette	6	6

Finals
(Ukraine) V Ivakhnenko (Russia) M Melnikova	6	7
2	(Hungary) T Babos (Poland) M Linette	4	5
