= 2012 Save Cup – Doubles =

Doubles
- 2012 Save Cup

Final
- Champions: (Argentina) Mailen Auroux (Argentina) María Irigoyen
- Runners-up: (Hungary) Réka-Luca Jani (Serbia) Teodora Mirčić
- Score: 5–7, 6–4, [10–8]

Events
Singles	Doubles
← 2011 ·	Save Cup	· 2013 →

Valentyna Ivakhnenko and Marina Melnikova were the defending champions, but Ivakhnenko chose not to participate. Melnikova partnered up with Sofia Shapatava, but they lost in the quarterfinals to Réka-Luca Jani and Teodora Mirčić.

Mailen Auroux and María Irigoyen won the title, defeating Jani and Mirčić in the final, 5–7, 6–4, [10–8].

== Seeds ==
1. (Spain) Inés Ferrer Suárez / (Netherlands) Richèl Hogenkamp (first round)
2. (Argentina) Mailen Auroux / (Argentina) María Irigoyen (champions)
3. (France) Séverine Beltrame / (France) Laura Thorpe (semifinals, withdrew)
4. (United States) Julia Cohen / (Denmark) Malou Ejdesgaard (first round)

== Draw ==
=== Key ===
- Q = Qualifier
- WC = Wild card
- LL = Lucky loser
- Alt = Alternate
- SE = Special exempt
- PR = Protected ranking
- ITF = ITF entry
- JE = Junior exempt
- w/o = Walkover
- r = Retired
- d = Defaulted
- SR = Special ranking

First round
1	(Spain) I Ferrer Suárez (Netherlands) R Hogenkamp	6	3	[8]
(Switzerland) T Bacsinszky (Bulgaria) E Kostova	1	6	[10]
(Italy) J Mayr (Slovakia) AK Schmiedlová	7^{7}	6
(Italy) N Clerico (Croatia) T Mrdeža	6^{4}	3
4	(United States) J Cohen (Denmark) M Ejdesgaard	4	1
(Russia) M Melnikova (Georgia (country)) S Shapatava	6	6
(Hungary) R-L Jani (Serbia) T Mirčić	6	6
(Italy) C Giovine (Romania) C Mitu	4	4
(Poland) M Domachowska (Poland) M Linette	6	7^{7}
(Italy) N Burnett (Spain) E Cabeza Candela	4	6^{4}
(Italy) ME Camerin (Italy) A Moratelli
3	(France) S Beltrame (France) L Thorpe	w/o
(Colombia) Y Lizarazo (Italy) A Remondina	6	6
WC	(Italy) G Bruschi (Italy) M Caciotti	1	0
(Italy) K Knapp (Italy) F Palmigiano	2	5
2	(Argentina) M Auroux (Argentina) M Irigoyen	6	7

Quarterfinals
(Switzerland) T Bacsinszky (Bulgaria) E Kostova	6	6
(Italy) J Mayr (Slovakia) AK Schmiedlová	3	2
(Russia) M Melnikova (Georgia (country)) S Shapatava	3	6^{6}
(Hungary) R-L Jani (Serbia) T Mirčić	6	7^{8}
(Poland) M Domachowska (Poland) M Linette	2	2
3	(France) S Beltrame (France) L Thorpe	6	6
(Colombia) Y Lizarazo (Italy) A Remondina	3	7^{7}	[6]
2	(Argentina) M Auroux (Argentina) M Irigoyen	6	6^{3}	[10]

Semifinals
(Switzerland) T Bacsinszky (Bulgaria) E Kostova	3	3
(Hungary) R-L Jani (Serbia) T Mirčić	6	6
3	(France) S Beltrame (France) L Thorpe
2	(Argentina) M Auroux (Argentina) M Irigoyen	w/o

Finals
(Hungary) R-L Jani (Serbia) T Mirčić	7	4	[8]
2	(Argentina) M Auroux (Argentina) M Irigoyen	5	6	[10]
