= Justine Ozga =

German tennis player

- Country (sports): Germany
- Born: 31 January 1988 (age 38) Gliwice, Poland
- Turned pro: 2005
- Plays: Right-handed (two-handed backhand)
- Prize money: $106,117

Singles
- Career record: 312–248
- Career titles: 2 ITF
- Highest ranking: No. 259 (15 October 2007)

Doubles
- Career record: 122–104
- Career titles: 8 ITF
- Highest ranking: No. 214 (20 September 2010)

Justine Ozga (born 31 January 1988) is a German former tennis player.

Ozga was born in Gliwice, Poland. In her career, she won two singles and eight doubles titles on the ITF Circuit. On 15 October 2007, she reached her best singles ranking of world No. 259. On 20 September 2010, she peaked at No. 214 in the doubles rankings.

== ITF Circuit finals ==
=== Singles: 7 (2 titles, 5 runner-ups) ===
| Legend $25,000 tournaments $10,000 tournaments | Finals by surface Hard (2–3) Clay (0–2) |

| Outcome | No. | Date | Tournament | Surface | Opponent | Score |
|---|---|---|---|---|---|---|
| Runner-up | 1. | 19 June 2005 | ITF Les Franqueses del Vallès, Spain | Hard | (Spain) Estrella Cabeza Candela | 6–7^{(3–7)}, 6–4, 2–6 |
| Runner-up | 2. | 16 October 2005 | ITF Porto Santo, Portugal | Hard | (Netherlands) Nicole Thyssen | 6–7^{(4–7)}, 4–6 |
| Winner | 1. | 5 October 2008 | ITF Les Franqueses del Vallès | Hard | (United States) Kristi Miller | 4–6, 6–3, 7–6^{(7–3)} |
| Runner-up | 3. | 26 February 2011 | ITF Portimão, Portugal | Hard | (Croatia) Ani Mijačika | 4–6, 4–6 |
| Winner | 2. | 19 February 2012 | ITF Portimão, Portugal | Hard | (Russia) Elena Bovina | 4–6, 6–1, 6–1 |
| Runner-up | 4. | 7 April 2013 | ITF Torrent, Spain | Clay | (Germany) Dinah Pfizenmaier | 3–6, 1–6 |
| Runner-up | 5. | 17 May 2014 | ITF Zielona Góra, Poland | Clay | (Russia) Natela Dzalamidze | 6–7^{(5–7)}, 4–6 |

=== Doubles: 21 (8 titles, 13 runner-ups) ===
| Legend $50,000 tournaments $25,000 tournaments $15,000 tournaments $10,000 tournaments | Finals by surface Hard (4–6) Clay (3–6) Carpet (1–1) |

| Outcome | No. | Date | Tournament | Surface | Partner | Opponents | Score |
|---|---|---|---|---|---|---|---|
| Winner | 1. | 18 June 2005 | ITF Les Franqueses del Vallès, Spain | Hard | (Germany) Hannah Kuervers | (India) Sandhya Nagaraj (Germany) Svenja Weidemann | 6–2, 6–2 |
| Runner-up | 1. | 27 August 2005 | ITF Bielefeld, Germany | Clay | (Germany) Andrea Sieveke | (Germany) Kristina Barrois (Germany) Korina Perkovic | 6–7^{(1–7)}, 3–6 |
| Winner | 2. | 10 September 2005 | ITF Vessy, Switzerland | Hard | (Germany) Alexandra Kiesl | (Sweden) Geraldine Roma (Switzerland) Vanessa Wellauer | 6–2, 6–2 |
| Runner-up | 2. | 13 May 2006 | ITF Warsaw, Poland | Clay | (Poland) Urszula Radwańska | (Latvia) Irina Kuzmina (Ukraine) Oksana Uzhylovska | 0–6, 1–6 |
| Runner-up | 3. | 17 June 2006 | ITF Lenzerheide, Switzerland | Clay | (Germany) Carmen Klaschka | (Czech Republic) Nikola Fraňková (Czech Republic) Lucie Kriegsmannová | 2–6, 4–6 |
| Winner | 3. | 26 August 2006 | ITF Bielefeld, Germany | Clay | (Germany) Carmen Klaschka | (Austria) Daniela Klemenschits (Austria) Sandra Klemenschits | 6–7^{(1–7)}, 6–3, 6–3 |
| Runner-up | 4. | 16 September 2006 | ITF Gliwice, Poland | Clay | (Germany) Carmen Klaschka | (Ukraine) Veronika Kapshay (Russia) Arina Rodionova | 4–6, 5–7 |
| Runner-up | 5. | 6 July 2007 | ITF Valladolid, Spain | Hard | (Germany) Ria Dörnemann | (Spain) Nuria Llagostera Vives (Spain) Arantxa Parra Santonja | 0–6, 2–6 |
| Runner-up | 6. | 28 July 2007 | ITF La Coruña, Spain | Hard | (Czech Republic) Andrea Hlaváčková | (New Zealand) Marina Erakovic (United Kingdom) Melanie South | 1–6, 6–4, 4–6 |
| Runner-up | 7. | 4 August 2007 | ITF Vigo, Spain | Hard | (Germany) Ria Dörnemann | (Spain) Estrella Cabeza Candela (Spain) Carla Suárez Navarro | 1–6, 6–4, 3–6 |
| Runner-up | 8. | 26 July 2008 | ITF Les Contamines, France | Hard | (Czech Republic) Darina Šeděnková | (Bosnia and Herzegovina) Mervana Jugić-Salkić (Serbia) Teodora Mirčić | 1–6, 4–6 |
| Winner | 4. | 21 November 2009 | ITF Opole, Poland | Carpet (i) | (Serbia) Ana Jovanović | (Ukraine) Lyudmyla Kichenok (Ukraine) Nadiia Kichenok | 6–4, 6–4 |
| Winner | 5. | 9 April 2010 | ITF Torhout, Belgium | Hard (i) | (Germany) Mona Barthel | (Czech Republic) Hana Birnerová (Russia) Ekaterina Bychkova | 7–5, 6–2 |
| Runner-up | 9. | 11 June 2010 | ITF Szczecin, Poland | Clay | (Ukraine) Veronika Kapshay | (Czech Republic) Petra Cetkovská (Czech Republic) Eva Hrdinová | 6–7^{(5–7)}, 3–6 |
| Runner-up | 10. | 31 July 2010 | ITF Vigo, Spain | Hard | (Georgia (country)) Sofia Kvatsabaia | (France) Anaïs Laurendon (United Kingdom) Anna Smith | 3–6, 1–6 |
| Winner | 6. | 14 August 2010 | ITF Koksijde, Belgium | Clay | (Italy) Nicole Clerico | (Spain) Lara Arruabarrena (Spain) María Teresa Torró Flor | 5–7, 6–4, [10–6] |
| Winner | 7. | 30 July 2011 | ITF Vigo, Spain | Hard | (Italy) Claudia Giovine | (Argentina) Vanesa Furlanetto (Argentina) Aranza Salut | 6–1, 6–3 |
| Runner-up | 11. | 3 March 2012 | ITF Bron, France | Hard (i) | (Bulgaria) Isabella Shinikova | (Latvia) Diāna Marcinkēviča (Greece) Despina Papamichail | 5–7, 5–7 |
| Runner-up | 12. | 7 September 2012 | ITF Alphen a/d Rijn, Netherlands | Clay | (Italy) Corinna Dentoni | (Romania) Diana Buzean (Netherlands) Daniëlle Harmsen | 2–6, 0–6 |
| Winner | 8. | 24 May 2013 | ITF Casablanca, Morocco | Clay | (Germany) Anna Zaja | (Bulgaria) Elitsa Kostova (Poland) Sandra Zaniewska | 6–4, 6–2 |
| Runner-up | 13. | 22 February 2014 | AK Ladies Open, Germany | Carpet (i) | (Italy) Claudia Giovine | (Germany) Carolin Daniels (Germany) Laura Schaeder | 6–1, 4–6, [7–10] |
