= 2013 Save Cup – Doubles =

Doubles
- 2013 Save Cup

Final
- Champions: (France) Laura Thorpe (Liechtenstein) Stephanie Vogt
- Runners-up: (Czech Republic) Petra Krejsová (Czech Republic) Tereza Smitková
- Score: 7–6^{(7–5)}, 7–5

Events
Singles	Doubles
← 2012 ·	Save Cup

Mailen Auroux and María Irigoyen were the defending champions, having won the event in 2012, but both players decided not to participate in 2013.

Laura Thorpe and Stephanie Vogt won the title, defeating Petra Krejsová and Tereza Smitková in the final, 7–6^{(7–5)}, 7–5.

== Seeds ==
1. (France) Laura Thorpe / (Liechtenstein) Stephanie Vogt (champions)
2. (Italy) Nicole Clerico / (Czech Republic) Nikola Fraňková (quarterfinals)
3. (Latvia) Diāna Marcinkēviča / (Germany) Anne Schäfer (quarterfinals)
4. (Hungary) Réka-Luca Jani / (Austria) Melanie Klaffner (quarterfinals)

== Draw ==
=== Key ===
- Q = Qualifier
- WC = Wild card
- LL = Lucky loser
- Alt = Alternate
- SE = Special exempt
- PR = Protected ranking
- ITF = ITF entry
- JE = Junior exempt
- w/o = Walkover
- r = Retired
- d = Defaulted
- SR = Special ranking

First round
(Belgium) M Boev (Hungary) Á Bukta	w/o
(Italy) G Brescia (Netherlands) E Vogelsang
4	(Hungary) R-L Jani (Austria) M Klaffner	7^{12}	6
(Russia) V Kan (Russia) I Khromacheva	6^{10}	3
(Italy) D Chiesa (Colombia) Y Lizarazo	4	6	[8]
(Italy) A Brianti (Italy) M Caregaro	6	4	[10]
(France) C Feuerstein (France) I Ramialison	6	6
(Spain) B García Vidagany (Italy) A Grymalska	3	2
(Brazil) G Cé (Brazil) PC Gonçalves	5	1
3	(Latvia) D Marcinkēviča (Germany) A Schäfer	7	6
(Italy) C Giovine (Italy) A Remondina	6^{5}	4
(Czech Republic) P Krejsová (Czech Republic) T Smitková	7^{7}	6

Quarterfinals
1	(France) L Thorpe (Liechtenstein) S Vogt	6	6
(Belgium) M Boev (Hungary) Á Bukta	2	1
4	(Hungary) R-L Jani (Austria) M Klaffner	5	0
(Italy) A Brianti (Italy) M Caregaro	7	6
(France) C Feuerstein (France) I Ramialison	6	6
3	(Latvia) D Marcinkēviča (Germany) A Schäfer	1	1
(Czech Republic) P Krejsová (Czech Republic) T Smitková	6	7
2	(Italy) N Clerico (Czech Republic) N Fraňková	3	5

Semifinals
1	(France) L Thorpe (Liechtenstein) S Vogt	7	6
(Italy) A Brianti (Italy) M Caregaro	5	1
(France) C Feuerstein (France) I Ramialison	1	1
(Czech Republic) P Krejsová (Czech Republic) T Smitková	6	6

Final
1	(France) L Thorpe (Liechtenstein) S Vogt	7^{7}	7
(Czech Republic) P Krejsová (Czech Republic) T Smitková	6^{5}	5
