= 2013 Save Cup – Singles =

Singles
- 2013 Save Cup

Final
- Champion: (France) Claire Feuerstein
- Runner-up: (Slovenia) Nastja Kolar
- Score: 6–1, 7–6^{(7–2)}

Events
Singles	Doubles
← 2012 ·	Save Cup

Karin Knapp was the defending champion, having won the event in 2012, but decided not to participate in 2013.

Claire Feuerstein won the title, defeating Nastja Kolar in the final, 6–1, 7–6^{(7–2)}.

== Seeds ==
1. (Spain) Estrella Cabeza Candela (first round)
2. (Liechtenstein) Stephanie Vogt (semifinals)
3. (France) Claire Feuerstein (champion)
4. (Austria) Melanie Klaffner (first round)
5. (Italy) Maria Elena Camerin (first round)
6. (Germany) Anne Schäfer (quarterfinals)
7. (Spain) Arantxa Parra Santonja (second round)
8. (Romania) Cristina Dinu (first round; defaulted)

== Main draw ==
=== Key ===
- Q = Qualifier
- WC = Wild card
- LL = Lucky loser
- Alt = Alternate
- SE = Special exempt
- PR = Protected ranking
- ITF = ITF entry
- JE = Junior exempt
- w/o = Walkover
- r = Retired
- d = Defaulted
- SR = Special ranking

=== Finals ===
Semifinals
(Spain) Beatriz García Vidagany	6	2	6^{2}
Q	(Slovenia) Nastja Kolar	3	6	7^{7}
3	(France) Claire Feuerstein	6	6
2	(Liechtenstein) Stephanie Vogt	4	4

Final
Q	(Slovenia) Nastja Kolar	1	6^{2}
3	(France) Claire Feuerstein	6	7^{7}

=== Top half ===
First round
1	(Spain) E Cabeza Candela	3	3
(Spain) B García Vidagany	6	6
(Hungary) R-L Jani	7	6
WC	(Italy) M Caregaro	5	4
(France) L Thorpe	7^{8}	6
(Russia) I Khromacheva	6^{6}	4
(Slovenia) M Zec Peškirič	5	2
6	(Germany) A Schäfer	7	6
4	(Austria) M Klaffner	5	4
Q	(Slovenia) N Kolar	7	6
Q	(Slovakia) Z Luknárová	6	6
(France) I Ramialison	4	2
(Czech Republic) T Smitková	6^{5}	1
(Poland) P Kania	7^{7}	6
(Italy) A Brianti	4	3
7	(Spain) A Parra Santonja	6	6

Second round
(Spain) B García Vidagany	7	6
(Hungary) R-L Jani	5	4
(France) L Thorpe	2	1
6	(Germany) A Schäfer	6	6
Q	(Slovenia) N Kolar	6	6
Q	(Slovakia) Z Luknárová	4	4
(Poland) P Kania	6	6
7	(Spain) A Parra Santonja	2	3

Quarterfinals
(Spain) B García Vidagany	6	6
6	(Germany) A Schäfer	4	4
Q	(Slovenia) N Kolar	6	6
(Poland) P Kania	3	2

Semifinals
(Spain) B García Vidagany	6	2	6^{2}
Q	(Slovenia) N Kolar	3	6	7^{7}

=== Bottom half ===
First round
5	(Italy) ME Camerin	3	6	4
(Russia) V Kan	6	3	6
(Italy) G Gatto-Monticone	4	4
(Latvia) D Marcinkēviča	6	6
Q	(Hungary) Á Bukta	6	6
WC	(Italy) A Remondina	2	3
(Bulgaria) D Evtimova	1	7^{7}	3
3	(France) C Feuerstein	6	6^{5}	6
8	(Romania) C Dinu	6	4	0^{d}
Q	(Greece) D Papamichail	3	6	0
(Italy) A Grymalska	5	6	6
WC	(Colombia) Y Lizarazo	7	2	3
WC	(Italy) D Chiesa	5
(Brazil) PC Gonçalves	0^{r}
(Italy) C Dentoni	6	3	5
2	(Liechtenstein) S Vogt	3	6	7

Second round
(Russia) V Kan	1	0^{r}
(Latvia) D Marcinkēviča	6	0
Q	(Hungary) Á Bukta	4	4
3	(France) C Feuerstein	6	6
Q	(Greece) D Papamichail	7^{7}	7
(Italy) A Grymalska	6^{4}	5
WC	(Italy) D Chiesa	1	2
2	(Liechtenstein) S Vogt	6	6

Quarterfinals
(Latvia) D Marcinkēviča	3	2
3	(France) C Feuerstein	6	6
Q	(Greece) D Papamichail	3	1
2	(Liechtenstein) S Vogt	6	6

Semifinals
3	(France) C Feuerstein	6	6
2	(Liechtenstein) S Vogt	4	4
