= Hana Birnerová =

Czech tennis player

- Country (sports): Czech Republic
- Born: 27 June 1989 (age 35); Czechoslovakia
- Prize money: US$28,225

Singles
- Career record: 12–32
- Career titles: 0
- Highest ranking: No. 933 (12 February 2007)

Grand Slam singles results
- Wimbledon Junior: Q1 (2005)

Doubles
- Career record: 90–115
- Career titles: 2 ITF
- Highest ranking: No. 177 (30 August 2010)

Hana Birnerová (born 27 June 1989) is a Czech former tennis player.

Birnerová won two doubles titles on the ITF Women's Circuit in her career. On 12 February 2007, she reached her best doubles ranking of world No. 177.

== ITF Circuit finals ==
=== Doubles: 10 (2–8) ===
Legend $100,000 tournaments $75,000 tournaments $50,000 tournaments $25,000 tournaments $10,000 tournaments	Finals by surface Hard (0–1) Clay (2–7) Grass (0–0) Carpet (0–0)

Result	No.	Date	Tournament	Surface	Partner	Opponents	Score
Loss	1.	29 May 2006	ITF Staré Splavy, Czech Republic	Clay	(Russia) Ksenia Lykina	(Czech Republic) Iveta Gerlová (Czech Republic) Lucie Kriegsmannová	7–6^{(4)}, 2–6, 2–6
Loss	2.	11 September 2006	ITF Innsbruck, Austria	Clay	(Czech Republic) Zuzana Zálabská	(Austria) Patricia Mayr (Austria) Yvonne Meusburger	3–6, 3–6
Loss	3.	28 May 2007	ITF Staré Splavy, Czech Republic	Clay	(Slovakia) Monika Kochanová	(Czech Republic) Iveta Gerlová (Czech Republic) Lucie Kriegsmannová	2–6, 1–6
Win	1.	25 August 2008	ITF Prague, Czech Republic	Clay	(Czech Republic) Lucie Kriegsmannová	(Czech Republic) Barbora Krtičková (Czech Republic) Lucie Šípková	6–2, 6–7^{(2)}, [10–7]
Loss	4.	1 September 2008	ITF Brno, Czech Republic	Clay	(Czech Republic) Darina Šeděnková	(Poland) Olga Brózda (Poland) Magdalena Kiszczyńska	2–6, 2–6
Loss	5.	5 April 2010	ITF Torhout, Belgium	Hard (i)	(Russia) Ekaterina Bychkova	(Germany) Mona Barthel (Germany) Justine Ozga	5–7, 2–6
Win	2.	9 August 2010	Reinert Open Versmold, Germany	Clay	(Japan) Erika Sema	(Russia) Aminat Kushkhova (Russia) Olga Panova	6–3, 6–3
Loss	6.	27 June 2011	ITF Stuttgart, Germany	Clay	(Liechtenstein) Stephanie Vogt	(Croatia) Darija Jurak (France) Anaïs Laurendon	6–4, 1–6, [0–10]
Loss	7.	4 July 2011	ITF Aschaffenburg, Germany	Clay	(Liechtenstein) Stephanie Vogt	(Turkey) Pemra Özgen (Japan) Yurika Sema	4–6, 6–7^{(5)}
Loss	8.	11 July 2011	ITF Darmstadt, Germany	Clay	(Czech Republic) Karolína Plíšková	(Russia) Natela Dzalamidze (Germany) Anna Zaja	5–7, 6–2, [6–10]
