= Svenja Weidemann =

German tennis player

- Full name: Svenja Weidemann
- Country (sports): Germany
- Born: 22 September 1980 (age 44); Marburg, West Germany
- Plays: Right-handed (two-handed forehand; one-handed backhand)
- Prize money: $23,397

Singles
- Career record: 73–98
- Career titles: 2 ITF
- Highest ranking: No. 496 (12 April 2010)

Doubles
- Career record: 21–41
- Career titles: 0
- Highest ranking: No. 554 (10 June 2002)

Svenja Weidemann (born 22 September 1980 in Marburg) is a German tennis player. She won two singles titles on the ITF tour and on 12 April 2010 reached a singles ranking high of world number 496.

== ITF finals (2–4) ==
=== Singles (2–1) ===
Legend $100,000 tournaments $75,000 tournaments $50,000 tournaments $25,000 tournaments $10,000 tournaments	Finals by surface Hard (1–0) Clay (1–0) Grass (0–1) Carpet (0–0)

Outcome	No.	Date	Tournament	Surface	Opponent	Score
Runner-up	1.	23 March 2002	Bendigo, Australia	Grass	(Australia) Lisa McShea	1–6, 4–6
Winner	1.	21 July 2008	Gausdal 3, Norway	Hard	(Germany) Mona Barthel	6–2, 6–3
Winner	2.	27 April 2009	Bournemouth, United Kingdom	Clay	(Hungary) Tímea Babos	4–6, 6–3, 6–4

=== Doubles (0–3) ===
Legend $100,000 tournaments $75,000 tournaments $50,000 tournaments $25,000 tournaments $10,000 tournaments	Finals by surface Hard (0–2) Clay (0–0) Grass (0–1) Carpet (0–0)

Outcome	No.	Date	Tournament	Surface	Partner	Opponents	Score
Runner-up	1.	11 March 2002	Benalla, Australia	Grass	(Australia) Casey Dellacqua	(Australia) Nicole Kriz (Australia) Sarah Stone	5–7, 1–6
Runner-up	2.	14 June 2005	Les Franqueses del Vallès, Spain	Hard	(India) Sandhya Nagaraj	(Germany) Hannah Kuervers (Germany) Justine Ozga	2–6, 2–6
Runner-up	3.	21 July 2008	Gausdal 3, Norway	Hard	(Germany) Mona Barthel	(South Africa) Tegan Edwards (Netherlands) Marcella Koek	6–1, 4–6, [8–10]
