= 2011 Save Cup – Singles =

Singles
- 2011 Save Cup

Final
- Champion: (Germany) Mona Barthel
- Runner-up: (Spain) Garbiñe Muguruza Blanco
- Score: 7–5, 6–2

Events
Singles	Doubles
← 2010 ·	Save Cup	· 2012 →

Zuzana Ondrášková was the defending champion, but chose not to participate.
Mona Barthel won the title by defeating Garbiñe Muguruza Blanco in the final 7–5, 6–2.

== Seeds ==
1. (Germany) Mona Barthel (champion)
2. (Czech Republic) Renata Voráčová (quarterfinals)
3. (Czech Republic) Sandra Záhlavová (semifinals)
4. (Russia) Ekaterina Ivanova (quarterfinals)
5. (Hungary) Tímea Babos (second round)
6. (Italy) Anna Floris (quarterfinals)
7. (Canada) Heidi El Tabakh (first round)
8. (Georgia (country)) Margalita Chakhnashvili (quarterfinals)

== Main draw ==
=== Key ===
- Q = Qualifier
- WC = Wild card
- LL = Lucky loser
- Alt = Alternate
- SE = Special exempt
- PR = Protected ranking
- ITF = ITF entry
- JE = Junior exempt
- w/o = Walkover
- r = Retired
- d = Defaulted
- SR = Special ranking

=== Finals ===
Semifinals
1	(Germany) Mona Barthel	6	7
3	(Czech Republic) Sandra Záhlavová	3	5
WC	(Croatia) Tereza Mrdeža	3	1
(Spain) Garbiñe Muguruza Blanco	6	6

Final
1	(Germany) Mona Barthel	7	6
(Spain) Garbiñe Muguruza Blanco	5	2

=== Top half ===
First round
1	(Germany) M Barthel	6	6
WC	(Italy) F Quercia	1	2
Q	(Italy) A Zucchini	6	1	3
Q	(Czech Republic) S Dobrá	3	6	6
(Poland) M Linette	7	2	3
(Italy) A Remondina	5	6	6
(Italy) N Burnett	5	2
6	(Italy) A Floris	7	6
3	(Czech Republic) S Záhlavová	6	6
WC	(Italy) C Rosatello	0	1
(France) C Feuerstein	7	6
(Romania) L Ungur	5	1
Q	(Italy) F di Sarra	6	6
(Slovakia) Z Luknárová	2	1
(Italy) J Mayr	4	3
8	(Georgia (country)) M Chakhnashvili	6	6

Second round
1	(Germany) M Barthel	6	6
Q	(Czech Republic) S Dobrá	3	2
(Italy) A Remondina	5	3
6	(Italy) A Floris	7	6
3	(Czech Republic) S Záhlavová	6	1	6
(France) C Feuerstein	3	6	3
Q	(Italy) F di Sarra	6^{3}	3
8	(Georgia (country)) M Chakhnashvili	7^{7}	6

Quarterfinals
1	(Germany) M Barthel	7^{7}	6
6	(Italy) A Floris	6^{2}	1
3	(Czech Republic) S Záhlavová	6	6
8	(Georgia (country)) M Chakhnashvili	3	2

Semifinals
1	(Germany) M Barthel	6	7
3	(Czech Republic) S Záhlavová	3	5

=== Bottom half ===
First round
7	(Canada) H El Tabakh	1	3
SE	(Russia) M Melnikova	6	6
WC	(Croatia) T Mrdeža	2	7^{7}	6
(Germany) A Schäfer	6	6^{4}	1
WC	(Italy) E Mayr	3	6	0
(Italy) G Gatto-Monticone	6	0	6
Q	(Latvia) D Marcinkēviča	6	1	3
4	(Russia) E Ivanova	4	6	6
5	(Hungary) T Babos	6	6
(Ukraine) I Buryachok	2	1
(Spain) E Fernández-Brugués	3	5
(Spain) G Muguruza Blanco	6	7
(Ukraine) V Ivakhnenko	4	6	5
(Spain) I Ferrer Suárez	6	3	7
SR	(Russia) N Ryzhonkova	7^{12}	2	2
2	(Czech Republic) R Voráčová	6^{10}	6	6

Second round
SE	(Russia) M Melnikova	1	1
WC	(Croatia) T Mrdeža	6	6
(Italy) G Gatto-Monticone	4	3
4	(Russia) E Ivanova	6	6
5	(Hungary) T Babos	6	5	3
(Spain) G Muguruza Blanco	2	7	6
(Spain) I Ferrer Suárez	4	4
2	(Czech Republic) R Voráčová	6	6

Quarterfinals
WC	(Croatia) T Mrdeža	6	6
4	(Russia) E Ivanova	3	3
(Spain) G Muguruza Blanco	2	6	6
2	(Czech Republic) R Voráčová	6	3	1

Semifinals
WC	(Croatia) T Mrdeža	3	1
(Spain) G Muguruza Blanco	6	6
