= Mona Barthel =

German tennis player (born 1993)

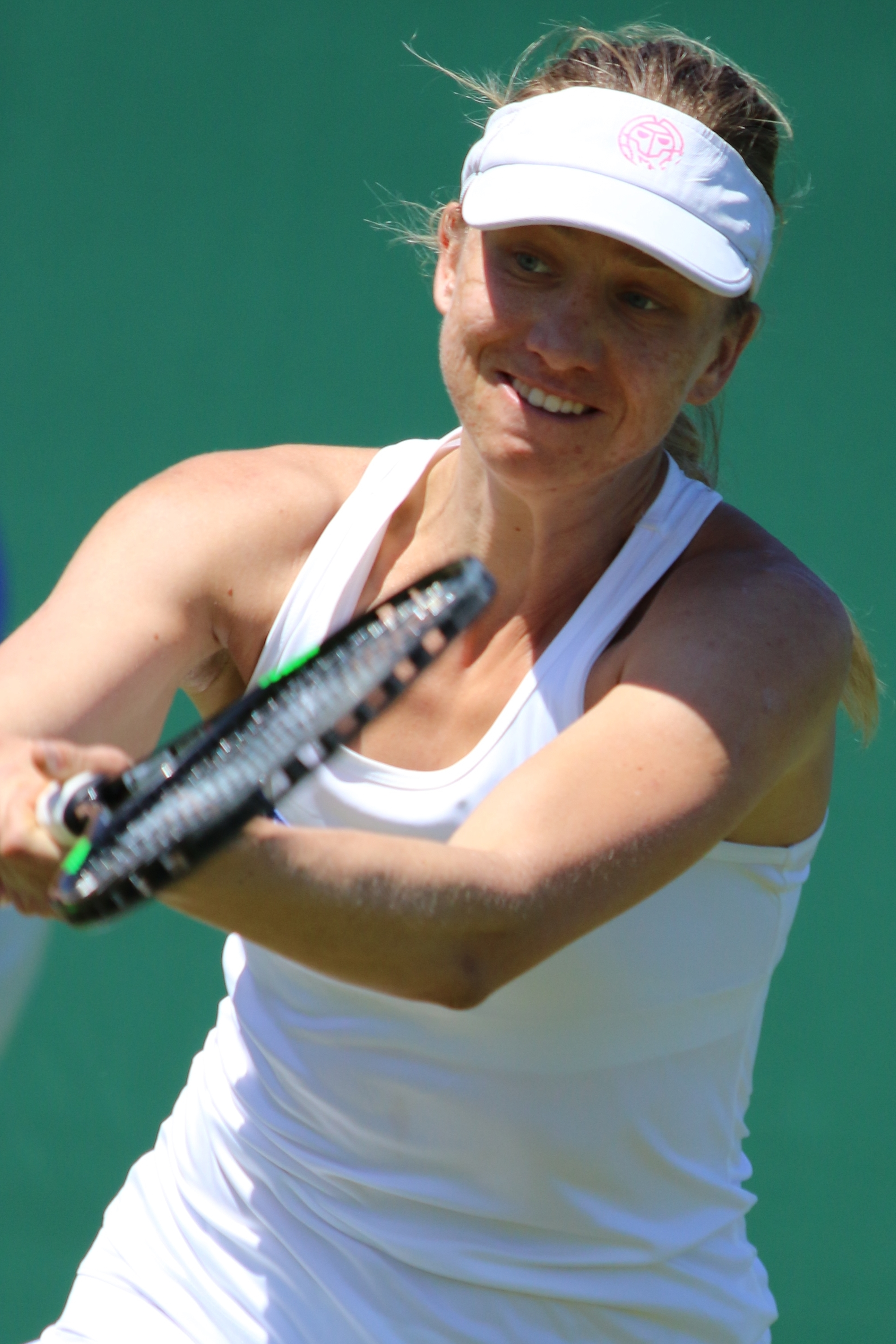
- Barthel at the 2018 Wimbledon Championships
- Country (sports): Germany
- Residence: Neumünster, Germany
- Born: 11 July 1990 (age 36) Bad Segeberg, West Germany
- Height: 1.85 m (6 ft 1 in)
- Turned pro: 2008
- Plays: Right-handed (two handed backhand)
- Prize money: US$4,421,787

Singles
- Career record: 518–407
- Career titles: 4
- Highest ranking: No. 23 (18 March 2013)
- Current ranking: No. 230 (10 November 2025)

Grand Slam singles results
- Australian Open: 4R (2017)
- French Open: 3R (2014)
- Wimbledon: 2R (2013, 2014, 2016)
- US Open: 3R (2015)

Other tournaments
- Olympic Games: 1R (2012, 2021)

Doubles
- Career record: 98–118
- Career titles: 3
- Highest ranking: No. 63 (14 September 2015)

Grand Slam doubles results
- Australian Open: 2R (2015, 2018, 2021)
- French Open: 2R (2013)
- Wimbledon: 3R (2015)
- US Open: 2R (2012, 2013, 2015, 2017)

Grand Slam mixed doubles results
- Wimbledon: 1R (2013)

Team competitions
- Fed Cup: 1R (2019)
- Last updated on: 10 November 2025.

Mona Barthel (born 11 July 1990) is a German tennis player. On 18 March 2013, she reached her best singles ranking of world No. 23. On 14 September 2015, she peaked at No. 63 in the doubles rankings.

Barthel has won four singles and three doubles titles on the WTA Tour, one doubles title on the WTA Challenger Tour as well as five singles titles and one doubles title on the ITF Circuit in her career.

== Early life ==
Mona Barthel was born in Bad Segeberg to Wolfgang Barthel, who won the shot put event at the 1970 European Junior Athletics Championships in Paris, and Dr. Hannelore. She was raised in a tennis-playing family, and took an interest in the game at age 3. She has cited Steffi Graf as an inspiration. Barthel moved to Neumünster, where she completed her Abitur in 2009, having attended the Klaus Groth Schule.

== Career ==
=== 2007–2010: Early career ===
Barthel played her first ITF tournament in July 2007 in Frinton where she qualified for the main tournament and reached the quarterfinals, losing to Jade Curtis. In July 2008, she reached the finals of the Frinton tournament, losing to Tara Moore, and the $10,000 event in Gausdal, losing to Svenja Weidemann. She also reached the doubles final in Gausdal partnering Weidemann, where they lost to Tegan Edwards and Marcella Koek. Her first ITF tournament victory was in January 2010 at the $10k tournament in Wrexham, beating Anne Kremer of Luxembourg in straight sets. In February 2010, she reached the doubles final of the $50k+H Biberach tournament, partnering Carmen Klaschka, losing to Stéphanie Cohen-Aloro and Selima Sfar. In April 2010, she won the singles title at the $50k Torhout tournament, beating Rebecca Marino in the final, and also won in doubles, partnering Justine Ozga, defeating Hana Birnerová and Ekaterina Bychkova in the final.

=== 2011: Success on the ITF Circuit ===
Barthel started 2011 by playing a $25k tournament in Andrézieux-Bouthéon, France. She won the tournament defeating Stephanie Vogt in the final. Next, Barthel competed at a $25k tournament in Grenoble, France. She lost in the second round to Stéphanie Foretz Gacon. Playing at a $25k ITF tournament in Sutton, England, Barthel advanced to the final where she was defeated by Kristina Mladenovic.

=== 2012: First WTA title ===
Barthel started her year at the Auckland Open. She defeated Jelena Dokić in the first round. In the second round, she lost in a close match to top seed and compatriot Sabine Lisicki. Qualifying for the Moorilla Hobart International in Hobart, Barthel reached the final after wins over Romina Oprandi, second seed Anabel Medina Garrigues, fifth seed Jarmila Gajdošová, and fourth seed Angelique Kerber. In the final, she defeated top seed Yanina Wickmayer to claim her first WTA title. With this win, Barthel became the first qualifier since September 2010 to win a WTA tournament. Following her maiden title win, Barthel made her debut at the Australian Open. Barthel won her first-round match when her opponent, Anne Keothavong, retired due to illness. In the second round, she beat 32nd seed Petra Cetkovská. In the third round, she lost to third seed and eventual champion Victoria Azarenka.

In February, Barthel competed at the Open GDF Suez in Paris. In order to play in the main draw, Barthel had to qualify, which she did by defeating Mariya Koryttseva, Julie Coin, and Varvara Lepchenko. In the first round of the main draw, she defeated Barbora Záhlavová-Strýcová. In the second round she crushed Frenchwoman Pauline Parmentier to move into the quarterfinals, but then lost her quarterfinal match to Yanina Wickmayer. At the Qatar Total Open in Doha, Barthel was defeated in the second round by top seed and eventual champion Victoria Azarenka. Barthel fell in the final round of qualifying at the Dubai Tennis Championships to Petra Martić. At the first Premier Mandatory event of the year at the BNP Paribas Open in Indian Wells, Barthel earned a comfortable first-round victory over American Jill Craybas. In the second round, she was up against top seed Victoria Azarenka. In this match, she played the best tennis in her career as she led 4–1 in the third set and served for the match twice. However, she ended up losing to the eventual champion. At the Sony Ericsson Open, Barthel reached the third round by beating Gréta Arn and thirteenth seed Jelena Janković. She was defeated in her third-round match by Ekaterina Makarova. Seeded sixth at the e-Boks Open, Barthel lost in the quarterfinals to second seed and eventual champion, Angelique Kerber.

Barthel began her clay-court season at the Porsche Tennis Grand Prix in her home country. Playing as a wildcard, she defeated former world number 1 and French Open Champion Ana Ivanovic in the first round. Barthel recorded her first victory against a top 10 player by defeating world number seven and seventh seed Marion Bartoli in the second round. In her quarterfinal match, she played world No. 1, Victoria Azarenka, for the fourth time that year and lost in three sets. Barthel was defeated in the second round at the Madrid Open to sixth seed Caroline Wozniacki. Seeded fifth at the Internationaux de Strasbourg, Barthel lost in the first round to qualifier Alexandra Panova. Seeded thirtieth at the French Open, Barthel suffered a first-round upset at the hands of American qualifier Lauren Davis.

Barthel had a very poor grass-court season. Seeded sixth at the Birmingham Classic, she lost in the second round to Andrea Hlaváčková. At the Eastbourne International, Barthel was defeated in round one by Chanelle Scheepers. Ranked 39 at the Wimbledon Championships, Barthel lost in the first round to 12th seed Vera Zvonareva.

Seeded seventh at the Swedish Open, Barthel was defeated in the semifinal round by defending champion and eventual champion Polona Hercog. Playing for Germany at the 2012 Summer Olympics, Barthel lost in the first round to Urszula Radwańska.

Starting her US Open series at the Rogers Cup, Barthel was defeated in the second round by second seed Agnieszka Radwańska. Barthel had a match point in the third set but failed to convert. In Cincinnati at the Western & Southern Open, Barthel faced fourth seed Petra Kvitová in the second round. She pushed Kvitová to three sets, but she ended up losing. Barthel played her final tournament before the US Open at the New Haven Open at Yale. She beat Daniela Hantuchová in the first round. She withdrew from her second-round match versus seventh seed Maria Kirilenko due to gastrointestinal illness. Ranked thirty-five at the US Open, Barthel was defeated in the first round by Bojana Jovanovski.

Seeded third at the Challenge Bell in Quebec City, Barthel advanced to the semifinals where she lost to eventual champion Kirsten Flipkens. At the China Open, Barthel lost in the first round to qualifier Elena Vesnina. In Austria at the Generali Ladies Linz, Barthel was defeated in the first round by Kiki Bertens. Barthel played her final tournament of the season at the Luxembourg Open. Seeded ninth, she lost in the second round to eventual champion, Venus Williams.

Barthel ended the year ranked 39.

=== 2013: Top-30 breakthrough: First Premier title ===
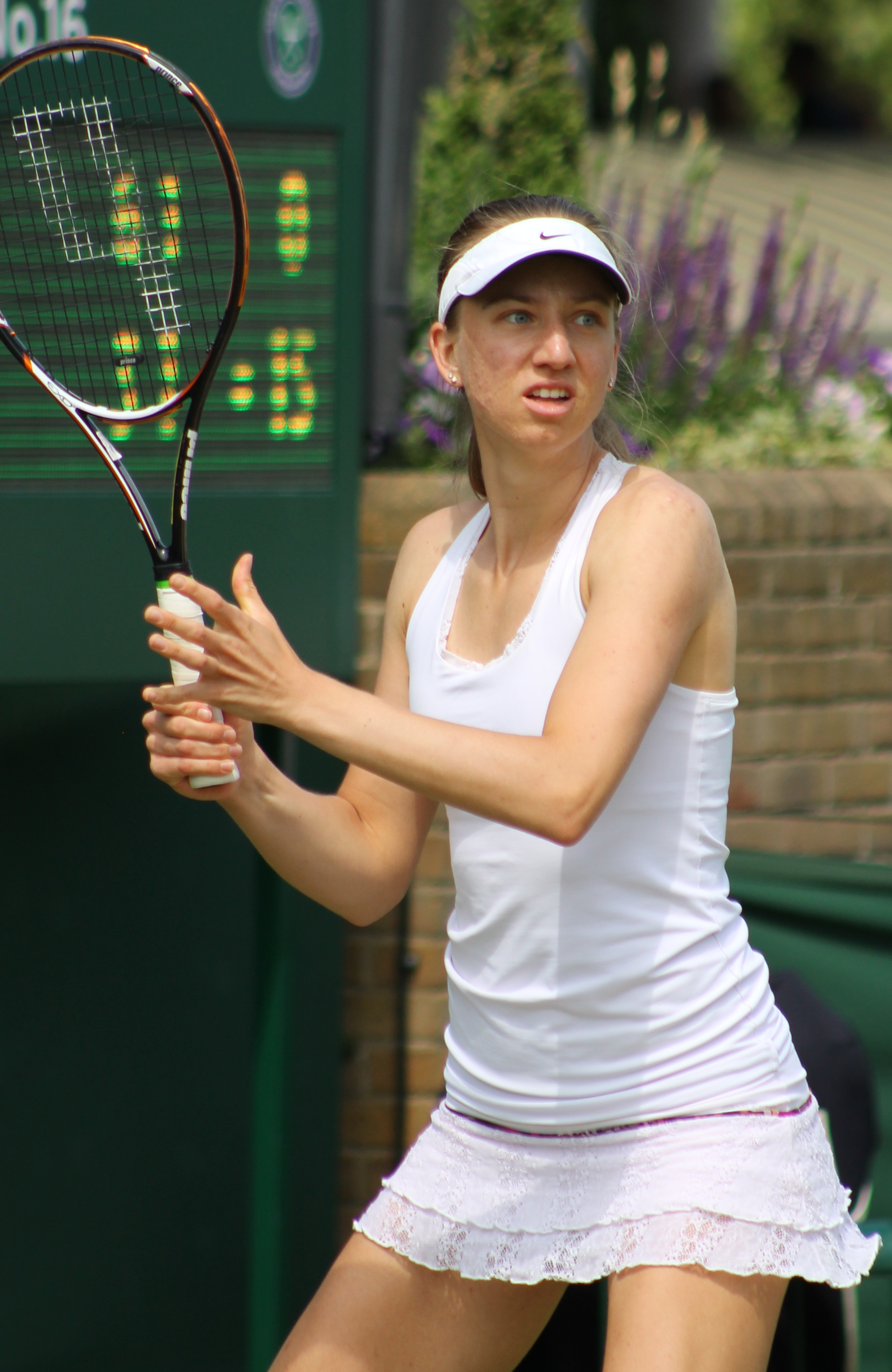
Barthel at the 2013 Wimbledon Championships

Barthel began her season at the ASB Classic. Seeded eighth, she reached the semifinals after wins over qualifier Grace Min, Eleni Daniilidou, and Johanna Larsson. She lost in her semifinal match to third seed Yanina Wickmayer. As the ninth seed and defending champion at the Moorilla Hobart International, Barthel again reached the final by defeating Australian wildcard Ashleigh Barty, Chanelle Scheepers, Tsvetana Pironkova, and Kirsten Flipkens. She failed to defend her title as she was defeated in the final by Elena Vesnina. Seeded 32nd at the Australian Open, Barthel suffered a first-round loss at the hands of Ksenia Pervak.

Playing at the 21st edition of the Open GDF Suez in Paris, Barthel advanced to the final after victories over Urszula Radwańska, fifth seed Roberta Vinci, third seed Marion Bartoli, and Kristina Mladenovic. She won over top seed Sara Errani in the final to earn her second WTA title and first premier title. In Doha at the Qatar Open, Barthel beat Yulia Putintseva in the first round. In the second round, she took out fifth seed Angelique Kerber. She lost in the third round to tenth seed Caroline Wozniacki. At the Premier Mandatory event in Indian Wells, Barthel made it to the fourth round, including wins over Kiki Bertens and former world number one and eleventh seed Ana Ivanovic. She lost to seventh seed Sam Stosur in the fourth round. Seeded 27th and receiving a first-round bye at the Miami Open, Barthel was defeated in the second round by Magdaléna Rybáriková.

Barthel started her clay-court season by participating at the Family Circle Cup, where she was the eighth seed. After receiving a bye into the first round, she lost to American qualifier Jessica Pegula, despite serving for the first set. Representing Germany for the first time, Barthel traveled to Stuttgart to play the Fed Cup World Group play-offs versus Serbia. In her first match, she lost to Ana Ivanovic in three sets but beat Bojana Jovanovski to bring the tie all-square at 2–2. After Sabine Lisicki and Anna-Lena Grönefeld beat the Serbian doubles team, it secured Germany their place in the 2014 Fed Cup World Group. After Fed Cup, Barthel stayed in Stuttgart to play at the Porsche Tennis Grand Prix. She was defeated in the first round by Lucie Šafářová. In doubles, she partnered with fellow German Sabine Lisicki where they beat experienced players, Bethanie Mattek-Sands and Sania Mirza in the final. This was Barthel's first doubles title. In Madrid at the Madrid Open, Barthel lost in the first round to Kirsten Flipkens. Barthel had to withdraw from the Premier 5 tournament in Rome, due to a stomach illness. At the second Grand Slam of the year in Paris, she lost to eighth seed Angelique Kerber in the first round, despite having set points in the first set tie-break.

Barthel began her grass-court season at the Aegon Classic. Seeded sixth, she was defeated in the third round by Madison Keys. Seeded fifth at the Topshelf Open, Barthel lost in the first round to qualifier Garbiñe Muguruza. Seeded 30th at the Wimbledon Championships, Barthel was defeated in the second round by Madison Keys.

As the top seed at the Gastein Ladies, Barthel retired from her second-round match versus Austrian wildcard Lisa-Maria Moser due to a shoulder injury.

Barthel kicked off the summer hardcourt season in North America at the Citi Open. Seeded sixth, she beat Stefanie Vögele in the first round. She lost to eventual finalist and compatriot Andrea Petkovic in the second round. In Toronto at the Rogers Cup, Barthel edged Zheng Jie in a three-set battle in the first round. In the second round, she lost to 14th seed Sloane Stephens. Barthel had a good preparation for the US Open at the Western & Southern Open in Cincinnati. She beat Lucie Šafářová in her first round match. She then upset 16th seed Maria Kirilenko in the second round. In round three, she lost to top seed Serena Williams. At the US Open, Barthel made it to round two where she was defeated by Alison Riske.

Barthel had poor results for the rest of the season. In Tokyo at the Pan Pacific Open, she lost in the first round to Venus Williams. In Beijing at the China Open, Barthel suffered a first-round loss at the hands of qualifier Lauren Davis. After Beijing, Barthel traveled to Austria to compete at the Generali Ladies Linz. She was defeated in the first round by Elina Svitolina. Her final tournament of the year was at the Luxembourg Open. Seeded sixth, she lost in the first round to Stefanie Vögele.

Barthel ended the year ranked 34.

=== 2014: Inconsistency; 3rd WTA title ===
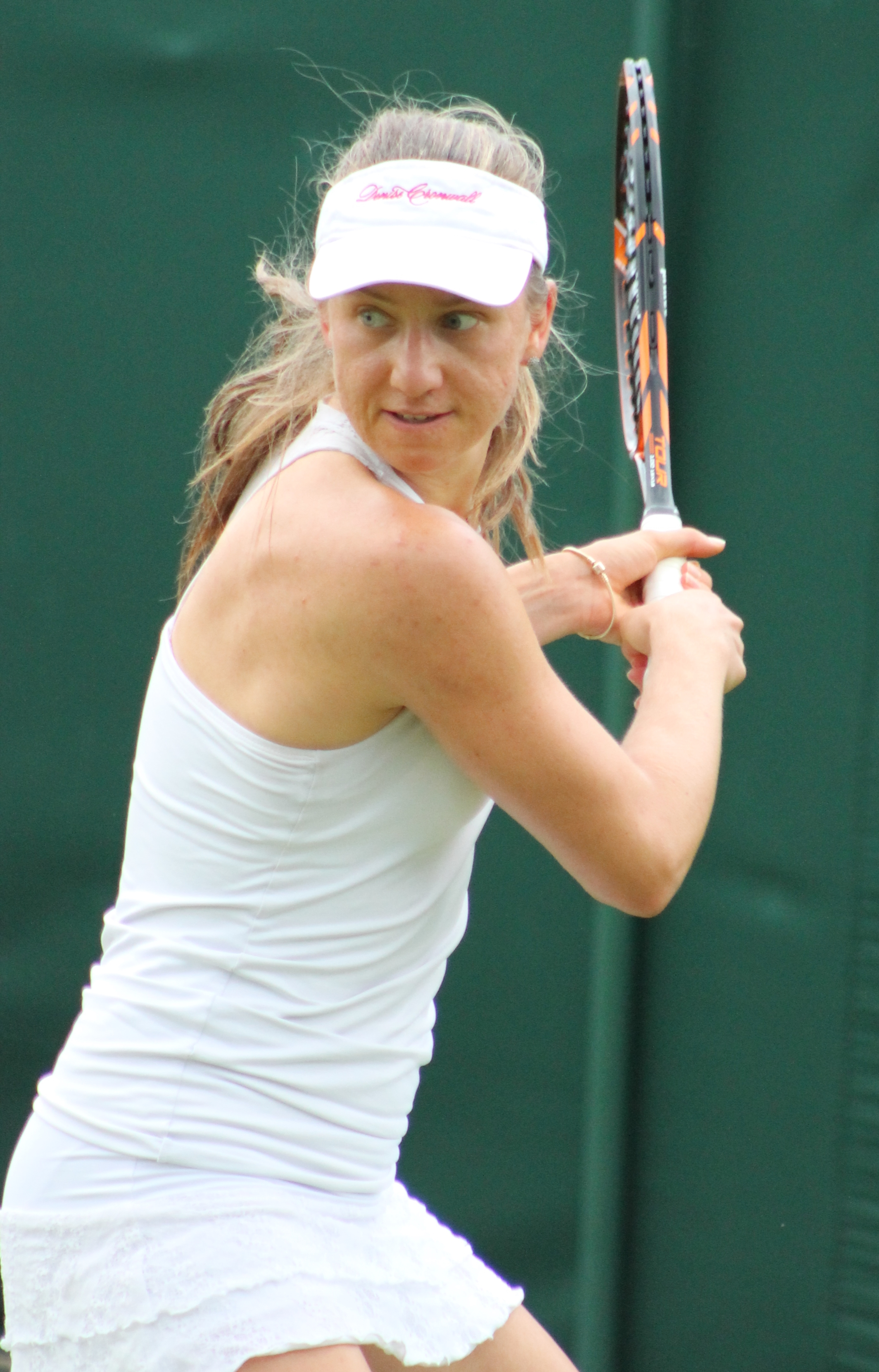
Barthel at the 2014 Wimbledon Championships

Barthel started her season at the ASB Classic. Seeded seventh, she lost in the first round to Yvonne Meusburger. Barthel then traveled to Hobart for the Hobart International. Seeded sixth, she defeated Elina Svitolina in the first round. In the second round, she lost to Monica Niculescu. At the Australian Open, Barthel defeated Shuai Zhang and Luksika Kumkhum in her first two rounds. In the third round, she lost to twenty-eighth seed Flavia Pennetta despite serving for the second set at 5–4.

Barthel went to Paris to defend her title at the Open GDF Suez, but she lost in the first round to eighth seed Kirsten Flipkens. With this loss, Barthel dropped from thirty-six to sixty-four in the world rankings. Barthel added further disappointment to her season with a first round defeat at the Qatar Total Open to compatriot Annika Beck. She also lost in the final round of qualifying at the Dubai Tennis Championships to Maryna Zanevska. In Indian Wells at the BNP Paribas Open, Barthel was defeated in the first round by Francesca Schiavone. In Miami at the Sony Open Tennis, Barthel faced Rebecca Peterson in the first round. She retired down 4–6, 2-4 due to gastrointestinal illness. Playing at the BNP Paribas Katowice Open for the first time, she was defeated in the first round by Annika Beck.

Barthel began her clay-court season at the Porsche Tennis Grand Prix. She reached the qualifying round where she lost to Ajla Tomljanović. However, she got a lucky loser spot in the main draw. In the first round, Barthel lost to fifth seed Jelena Janković even though she had several match points against the Serb. Barthel then lost in the 2nd round of qualifying at the Portugal Open to Kiki Bertens and at the Mutua Madrid Open to Petra Cetkovská. Barthel qualified for the Italian Open defeating María Teresa Torró Flor and Virginie Razzano. In the first round, she lost to thirteenth seed Carla Suárez Navarro. Before the French Open, Barthel competed at the Nürnberger Versicherungscup. She defeated Belinda Bencic in the first round. In the second round, she beat eighth seed Annika Beck before losing in the quarterfinals to fourth seed Elina Svitolina. Barthel had a good run at the French Open. She beat Karin Knapp in her opener. She advanced to the third round when compatriot and sixteenth seed Sabine Lisicki was forced to retire with a wrist injury. In the third round, Barthel lost to French wildcard Pauline Parmentier.

Barthel started her grass-court season at the Aegon Classic. She defeated Ajla Tomljanović in the first round before falling to top seed and eventual champion Ana Ivanovic in the second round. The following week, she qualified for the Topshelf Open beating Dinah Pfizenmaier and Urszula Radwańska. In the first round, she beat Maria Kirilenko. In the second round, she lost to eighth seed Klára Koukalová. At the Wimbledon Championships, Barthel beat Romina Oprandi in the first round. In the second, she lost to sixth seed and eventual champion, Petra Kvitová.

Playing at the Gastein Ladies, she lost to eighth seed Karolína Plíšková in the first round. The following week, Barthel competed at the Swedish Open. She reached the final after wins over qualifier Tereza Martincová, qualifier Gabriela Dabrowski, Kaia Kanepi, and Sílvia Soler Espinosa. In the final, Barthel defeated Chanelle Scheepers to win her third WTA title. Barthel moved back into the world's top-50 after this result.

Barthel began her US Open Series by playing qualifying at the Western & Southern Open where she lost to Annika Beck in the qualifying round. However, due to Azarenka's withdrawal, Barthel got a lucky loser spot into the main draw. In the first round, she was defeated by Barbora Záhlavová-Strýcová. Barthel then played qualifying at the Connecticut Open. She won the first two rounds of qualifying defeating Kiki Bertens and Jana Čepelová. In the final round of qualifying, Barthel lost to Belinda Bencic. At the US Open, Barthel defeated thirty-second seed Shuai Zhang in the first round. She lost in the second round to American Varvara Lepchenko.

At the Korea Open, she beat seventh seed Caroline Garcia in the first round. Barthel then lost in the second round to Christina McHale. At the first edition of the Wuhan Open, Barthel defeated Peng Shuai in the first round before losing in the second round to sixth seed and eventual finalist Eugenie Bouchard. Barthel qualified for the China Open defeating Misaki Doi and Marina Erakovic. In the first round, she beat Bethanie Mattek-Sands. In the second round, Barthel lost to 13th seed Lucie Šafářová. In Austria at the Generali Ladies Linz, Barthel defeated lucky loser Kiki Bertens in the first round. She lost in the second round to seventh seed and eventual champion Karolína Plíšková. Barthel's final tournament of the year was at the BGL Luxembourg Open. She reached the semifinals where she fell to fourth seed Barbora Záhlavová-Strýcová.

Barthel ended the year ranked 43.

=== 2015: Second WTA title in doubles ===
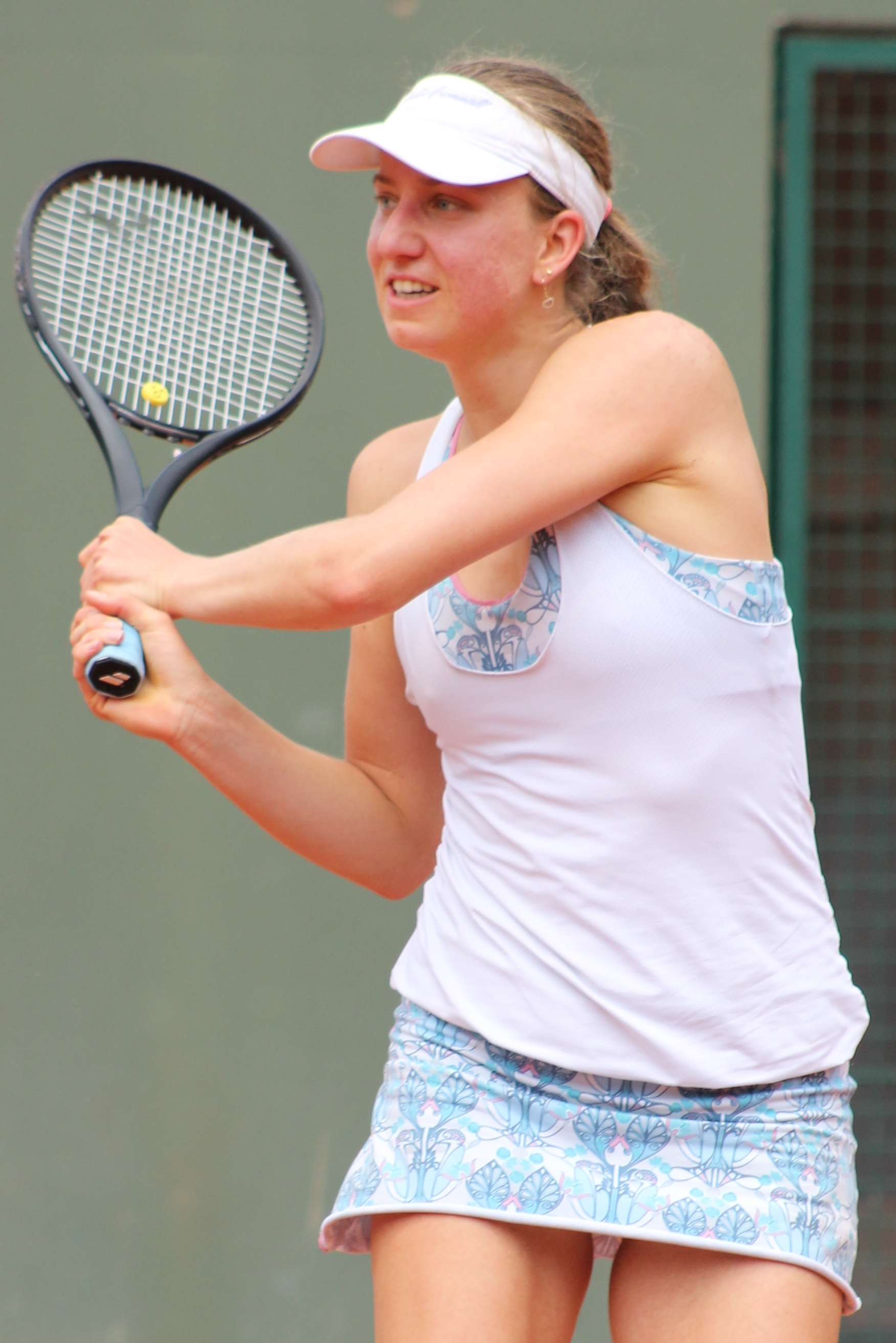
Barthel at the 2015 French Open

During her preparation for 2015, Barthel suffered a torn ligament in her right foot.

Barthel began the year at the ASB Classic. Seeded eighth, she lost in the first round to Ana Konjuh. Barthel then traveled to Hobart for the Hobart International. Seeded seventh, she was defeated in the first round to qualifier and eventual finalist Madison Brengle. At the Australian Open, Barthel defeated Donna Vekić in the first round. In the second round, she lost to fourth seed Petra Kvitová.

After the Australian Open, Barthel competed at the Diamond Games where she beat qualifier Klaartje Liebens in the first round. In the second, she stunned top seed Eugenie Bouchard before she lost to Barbora Záhlavová-Strýcová. Barthel then lost in the first round at the Dubai Tennis Championships to wildcard Daniela Hantuchová. Barthel was defeated in the first round of qualifying at the Qatar Open by Kateryna Kozlova. Playing at the Indian Wells Open, Barthel defeated Kristina Mladenovic in the first round. In the second round, she lost to tenth seed Lucie Šafářová. Barthel then had a first-round exit at the Miami Open, losing to Bojana Jovanovski.

Barthel began her clay-court season at the Family Circle Cup in Charleston. Seeded 15th, she defeated Tímea Babos in the first round and American Sloane Stephens in the second. In round three, she retired against American Lauren Davis at 4–6, 0-3 due to dizziness. In Stuttgart at the Porsche Tennis Grand Prix, she lost in the first round to wildcard and compatriot Carina Witthöft. Seeded fifth at the Morocco Open, Barthel was defeated in the first round by eventual finalist Tímea Babos. She lost in the first round at the Madrid Open to qualifier Christina McHale. At the Italian Open, Barthel was defeated in the first round by tenth seed and eventual finalist Carla Suárez Navarro. Her final tournament before the French Open was the Internationaux de Strasbourg, where she was the eighth seed. In the first round, she faced French wildcard Virginie Razzano. Barthel retired down 2–6, 5-5 due to a wrist injury. At the French Open, Barthel was defeated in the first round by qualifier Paula Kania.

Barthel missed the Nottingham Open and the Birmingham Classic due to a wrist injury. Barthel only played one grass-court tournament before Wimbledon, at Eastbourne where she lost in the first round to eventual champion Belinda Bencic. At the Wimbledon Championships, Barthel lost in the first round to Anastasia Pavlyuchenkova.

After Wimbledon, Barthel competed at the Swedish Open, where she was the fourth seed and defending champion. She reached the final for the second year in a row beating Kiki Bertens, Maryna Zanevska, Rebecca Peterson, and Lara Arruabarrena. However, Barthel failed to defend her title since she lost in the final to seventh seed Johanna Larsson. In Turkey at the İstanbul Cup, Barthel defeated qualifier Olga Savchuk in the first round. In the second round, she lost to qualifier Kateryna Bondarenko.

Barthel began her US Open Series by competing at the Stanford Classic. She reached the quarterfinals by defeating wildcard Carol Zhao and sixth seed Andrea Petkovic. In the quarterfinals, Barthel lost to Varvara Lepchenko. In Toronto at the Rogers Cup, Barthel lost in the final round of qualifying to Anna Tatishvili. Barthel qualified for the Western & Southern Open by defeating Elena Vesnina and Irina Falconi. In the first round, she defeated qualifier Casey Dellacqua. In the second round, she lost to Sloane Stephens. Barthel reached the third round at the US Open for the first time by beating Tsvetana Pironkova and Olga Govortsova. In the third round, she lost to Varvara Lepchenko.

Seeded third at the Coupe Banque Nationale, Barthel lost in the first round to eventual finalist Jeļena Ostapenko. Barthel, as the fifth seed, reached the quarterfinals at the Korea Open defeating wildcard Jang Su-jeong and Mariana Duque Mariño. She lost in her quarterfinal match to second seed Anna Karolína Schmiedlová. Barthel then lost in the first round of qualifying at the Wuhan Open to Patricia Maria Țig. In Beijing at the China Open, Barthel beat Chinese wildcard Shuai Zhang in the first round. In the second round, she lost to fourth seed Agnieszka Radwańska. At the Generali Ladies Linz, Barthel defeated qualifier Kiki Bertens in the first round. She then lost in the second round to qualifier Aleksandra Krunić. At her final tournament of the year, the BGL Luxembourg Open, Barthel reached the final defeating sixth seed Sloane Stephens, Tatjana Maria, Mirjana Lučić-Baroni, and Stefanie Vögele. In the final, Barthel was defeated by Misaki Doi. However, in doubles, Barthel and fellow German Laura Siegemund defeated Spaniards Anabel Medina Garrigues and Arantxa Parra Santonja in the final. This was her second WTA title in doubles.

Barthel ended the year ranked 44.

=== 2016: Out of the top 100 ===
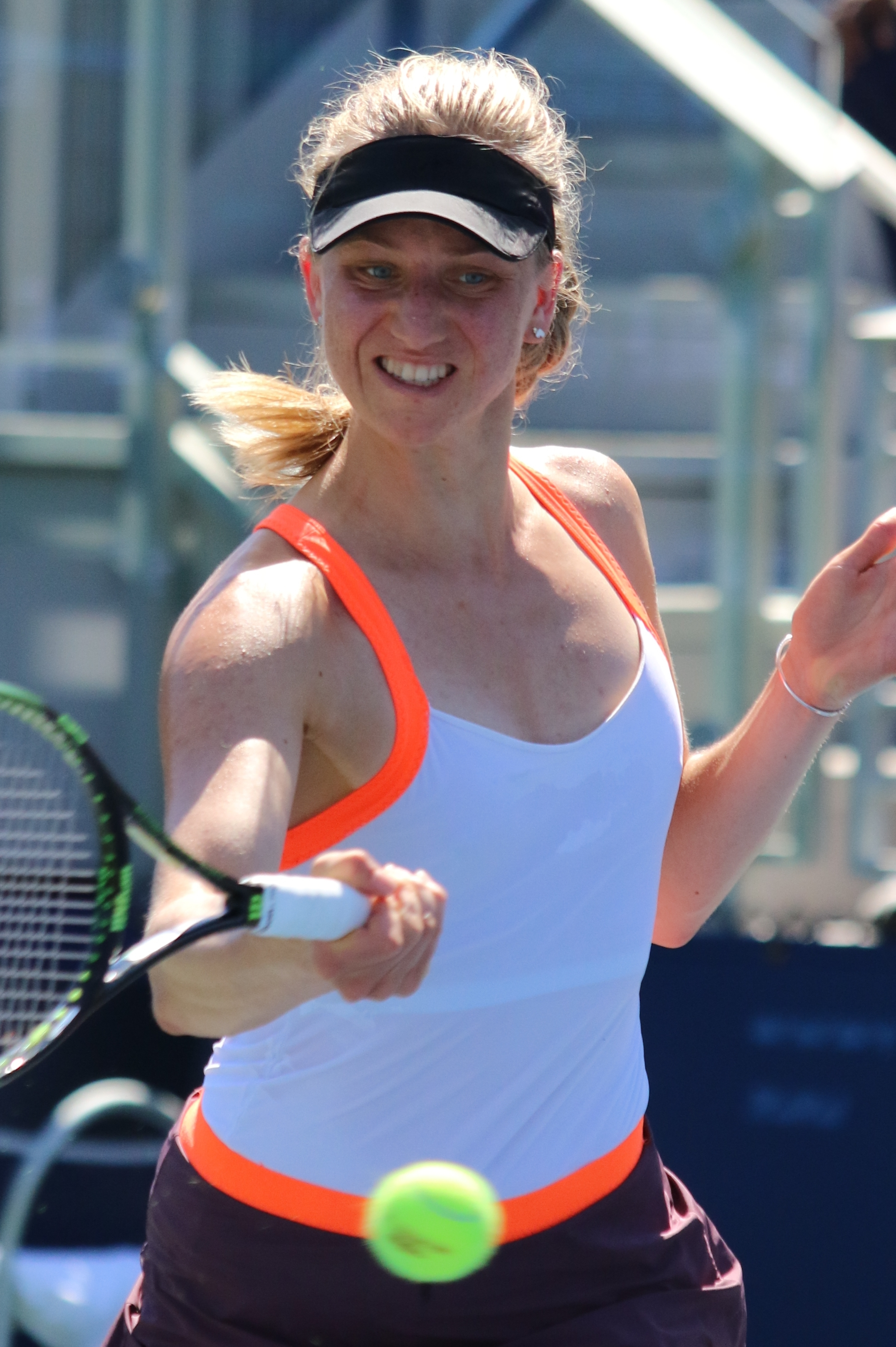
Barthel at the 2016 US Open

Barthel began her year at the Auckland Open. In the first round, she faced fourth seed Svetlana Kuznetsova. Barthel retired trailing 2–6, 1-1 due to illness. Seeded ninth at the Hobart International, she defeated Misaki Doi in the first round. In the second round, Barthel suffered a back injury, but she still managed to beat qualifier Naomi Osaka. She withdrew from her quarterfinal match against seventh seed Alizé Cornet due to the back injury. At the Australian Open, Barthel was defeated in the first round by Vania King.

Barthel missed the St. Petersburg Ladies' Trophy, Qatar Open, Indian Wells Open, Miami Open, Charleston Open, Prague Open, and Nürnberger Versicherungscup due to health problems.

Barthel returned at the French Open where she lost in the first round to Irina Falconi.

Barthel began her grass-court season at the Nottingham Open. Seeded seventh, she lost in the first round to eventual finalist Alison Riske. She then withdrew from the first edition of the Mallorca Open and the Eastbourne International due to illness. At the Wimbledon Championships, she defeated Danka Kovinić in the first round. In the second round, Barthel lost to twenty-sixth seed Kiki Bertens.

After Wimbledon, Barthel competed at the Ladies Championship Gstaad. Seeded seventh, Barthel was defeated in the first round by the eventual champion Viktorija Golubic. Playing at the Swedish Open, Barthel was leading 4–6, 6–3, 3–0 in her first-round match against seventh seed Yaroslava Shvedova when Shvedova retired due to a back injury. In the second round, Barthel lost to Karin Knapp. As the top seed at the Advantage Cars Prague Open, Barthel retired in her quarterfinal match after losing the first set to qualifier and compatriot Antonia Lottner.

Playing at the Western & Southern Open, Barthel lost in the first round of qualifying to Daria Gavrilova. At the Connecticut Open, Barthel lost in the second round of qualifying to Camila Giorgi. In New York at the US Open, Barthel was defeated in the first round by Christina McHale.

Seeded sixth at the Coupe Banque Nationale, Barthel was defeated in the first round by Canadian wildcard Françoise Abanda. In Korea at the Korea Open, Barthel had her first WTA main draw win since Bastad by beating seventh seed Nicole Gibbs in the first round. She lost in the second round to Camila Giorgi. Playing in Austria at the Generali Ladies Linz, Barthel was defeated in the first round by fourth seed Carla Suárez Navarro. Last year finalist at the Luxembourg Open, Barthel lost in the second round to eighth seed Johanna Larsson. After Luxembourg, Barthel traveled to Poitiers to compete at the Internationaux Féminins de la Vienne. She was defeated in the second round by Alison Van Uytvanck. In Limoges at the Open de Limoges, Barthel lost in the first round to eighth seed Stefanie Vögele. Barthel played her final tournament of the year at the Al Habtoor Tennis Challenge in Dubai. She reached the semifinals defeating third seed Evgeniya Rodina, Nina Stojanović, and Ivana Jorović. In the semifinals, Barthel lost to fifth seed and eventual champion Hsieh Su-wei.

Barthel ended the year ranked 183.

=== 2017: 1st WTA singles title since 2014 ===
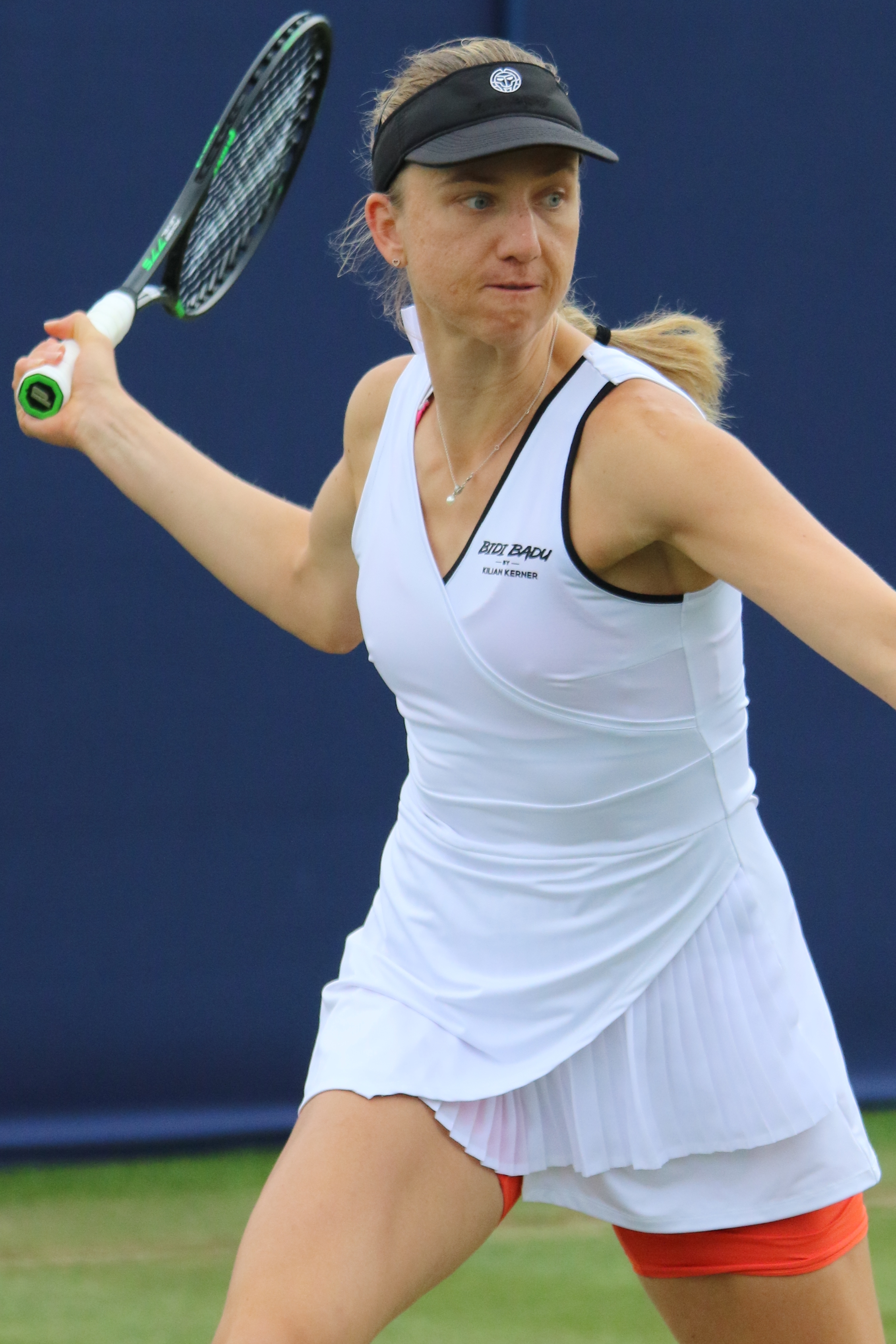
Barthel at the 2017 Eastbourne International

Barthel began her season by playing in the qualifying rounds at the ASB Classic. She qualified for the main draw beating Magda Linette, wildcard Joanna Carswell, and Dalila Jakupović. In the first round, she lost to Mirjana Lučić-Baroni. At the Sydney International, Barthel was defeated in the first round of qualifying by Danka Kovinić. Barthel qualified for the Australian Open beating Richèl Hogenkamp, Teliana Pereira, and Maryna Zanevska. In the main draw, she reached the fourth round at the Australian Open for the first time in her career after having victories over wildcard Destanee Aiava, twenty-ninth seed Monica Puig, and wildcard Ashleigh Barty. Barthel lost to 13th seed and eventual finalist, Venus Williams, in the fourth round. After the tournament, her ranking improved from 181 to 111.

In Qatar at the Qatar Open, Barthel lost in the first round of qualifying to Kristýna Plíšková. Receiving a wildcard to play at the Dubai Tennis Championships, Barthel beat Jelena Janković in the first round. In the second round, she was defeated by top seed Angelique Kerber. After qualifying for the Indian Wells Open, Barthel was defeated in the first round by Kateřina Siniaková. At the Miami Open, Barthel lost in the second round of qualifying to Taylor Townsend.

Barthel began her clay-court season at the Volvo Car Open. She beat American Jennifer Brady in the first round. In the second round, Barthel lost to eleventh seed Mirjana Lučić-Baroni. Next, Barthel competed at the first edition of the Ladies Open Biel Bienne. She won her first-round match over Jana Čepelová. In the second round, she lost to Elise Mertens. Barthel qualified for the Prague Open beating Sachia Vickery, Jasmine Paolini, and Denisa Allertová. She advanced to her first WTA singles final since 2015 by defeating sixth seed Zhang Shuai, Océane Dodin, Camila Giorgi, and third seed Barbora Strýcová. In the final, Barthel defeated Kristýna Plíšková to win her 4th WTA singles title and her first WTA singles title since 2014. After the tournament, her ranking went from 82 to 56. Barthel played her final tournament before the French Open at the Italian Open defeating Maria Sakkari and Varvara Lepchenko. In the first round, she beat Peng Shuai. In the second round, she defeated qualifier Qiang Wang. In the third round, Barthel lost to eighth seed and eventual champion Elina Svitolina. Ranked fifty at the French Open, Barthel was defeated in the first round by Tsvetana Pironkova.

Barthel began her grass-court season at the Nottingham Open. Seeded seventh, she lost in the first round to qualifier Jana Fett. At the Mallorca Open, Barthel lost in the second round to CiCi Bellis. Barthel qualified for the main draw at the Eastbourne International beating Beatriz Haddad Maia and Kristína Kučová. She was defeated in the second round by seventh seed Svetlana Kuznetsova. Ranked forty-eight at the Wimbledon Championships, Barthel lost in the first round to twenty-fourth seed Coco Vandeweghe.

Seeded fourth at the Ladies Championship Gstaad, Barthel was defeated in the first round by Maria Sakkari. In Båstad at the Swedish Open, Barthel upset ninth seed Johanna Larsson in the first round. She lost in the second round to qualifier Kateryna Kozlova.

Barthel began her US Open Series at the Rogers Cup. She lost in the first round of qualifying to Mariana Duque Mariño. In Cincinnati at the Western & Southern Open, Barthel was defeated in the first round of qualifying by Zarina Diyas. Playing in New Haven at the Connecticut Open, her final tournament before the US Open, Barthel lost in the first round of qualifying to Pauline Parmentier. Ranked fifty-one at the US Open, Barthel was defeated in round one by Ekaterina Makarova.

After the US Open, Barthel turned toward the Asian swing. In Guangzhou at the Guangzhou International Open, Barthel lost in round two to eventual finalist Aleksandra Krunić. The week after Guangzhou, Barthel was defeated in the first round at the Wuhan Open by qualifier Monica Puig. Competing in Beijing at the China Open, Barthel lost in the first round to Sorana Cîrstea. That ended up being her final tournament of the year.

Barthel ended the year ranked 48.

=== 2018 ===
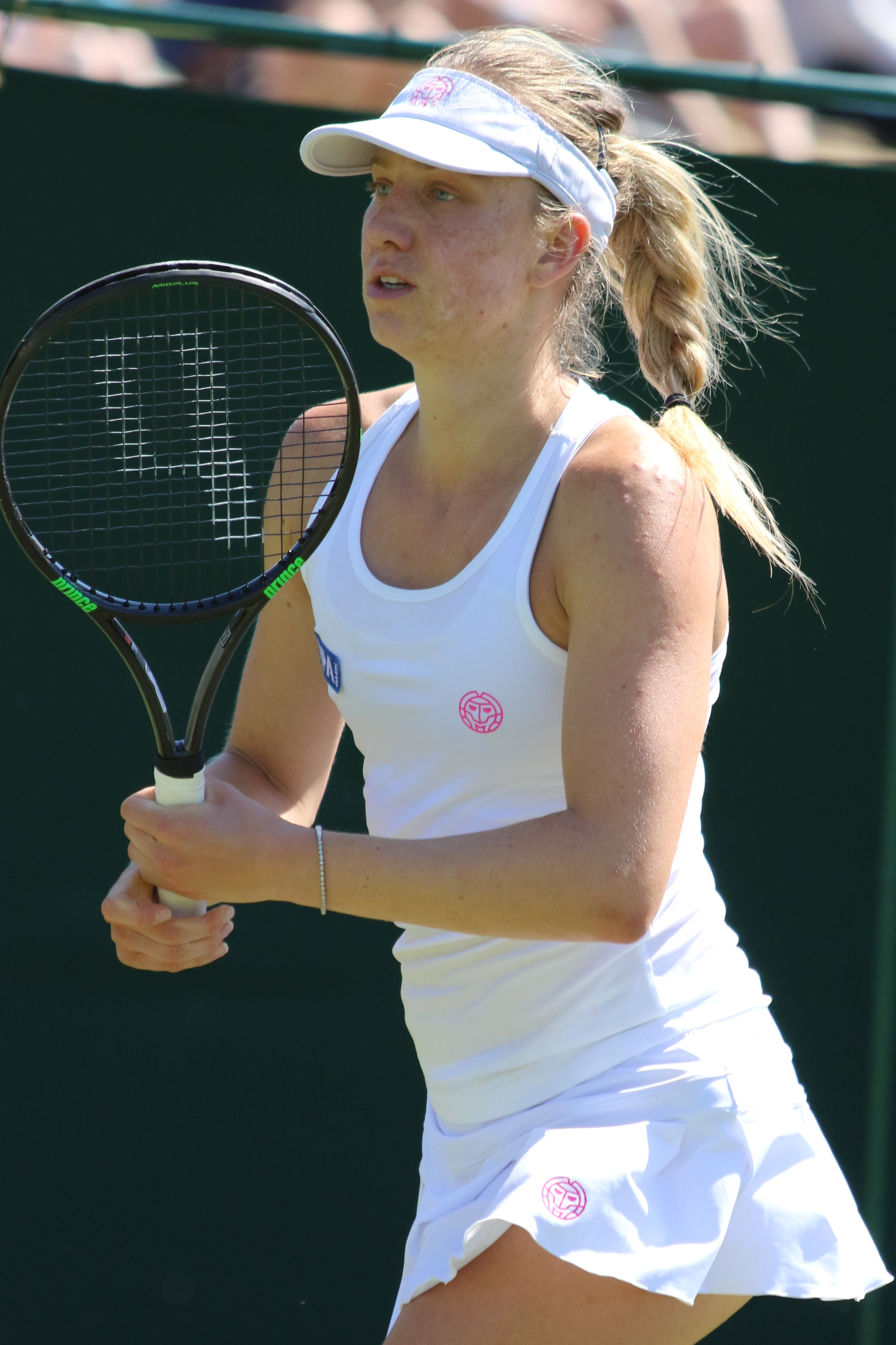
Barthel during the 2018 Wimbledon Qualifying

Barthel started the year off at Auckland. Seeded seventh, she lost in the first round to Varvara Lepchenko. At the Hobart International, Barthel was again defeated in the first round by Lepchenko. Ranked 53 at the Australian Open, Barthel lost in round two to 32nd seed Anett Kontaveit.

Competing at the St. Petersburg Ladies' Trophy in Russia, Barthel was defeated in the first round by Alizé Cornet. In Qatar at the Qatar Total Open, Barthel suffered a three-set first-round loss at the hands of Agnieszka Radwańska. Barthel had multiple match points but failed to get the victory. After Qatar, Barthel traveled to Hungary to play at the Hungarian Ladies Open. Here, she reached the semifinal after wins over Kateryna Kozlova, third seed and defending champion Tímea Babos, and qualifier Ysaline Bonaventure. She lost in her semifinal match to top seed Dominika Cibulková. In Indian Wells at the BNP Paribas Open, Barthel was defeated in the second round by fourth seed Elina Svitolina. At the Miami Open, Barthel lost in round one to Tímea Babos.

Barthel began her clay-court season at the Ladies Open Lugano. She made it to the quarterfinals after defeating fifth seed Svetlana Kuznetsova and Donna Vekić. She lost in her quarterfinal match to second seed and eventual champion Elise Mertens. At the İstanbul Cup, Barthel was defeated in the first round by Christina McHale. Barthel retired in the final round of qualifying at the Mutua Madrid Open to Sílvia Soler Espinosa due to injury. Barthel lost in the final round of qualifying at the Italian Open to Hsieh Su-Wei. In Nuremberg at the Nürnberger Versicherungscup, Barthel was defeated in the second round by third seed Kiki Bertens. Playing in Paris at the French Open, Barthel lost in the first round to twelfth seed Angelique Kerber.

In Croatia at the Bol Open, Barthel lost in round one to Viktoriya Tomova.

Barthel began her grass-court season at the Nottingham Open. She made it to the quarterfinals after wins over British qualifier Katie Swan and second seed Magdaléna Rybáriková. She was defeated in her quarterfinal match by sixth seed and defending champion Donna Vekić. In Ilkley at the Fuzion 100 Ilkley Trophy, a 100k ITF event, Barthel lost in the first round to Irina Falconi. Barthel qualified for the Wimbledon Championships beating Fanny Stollár, Océane Dodin, and Jamie Loeb. She didn't make it past round one because she was defeated by Yanina Wickmayer.

Seeded eighth at the Grand Est Open 88, a 100k ITF tournament in Contrexéville, Barthel lost in the quarterfinals to third seed and eventual champion Stefanie Vögele. In Gstaad at the Ladies Championship Gstaad, Barthel was defeated in the second round by Evgeniya Rodina. As the top seed at the Advantage Cars Prague Open, an 80k ITF tournament in Prague, Barthel lost in her quarterfinal match to Iga Świątek.

Barthel lost in the final round of qualifying at the US Open to Francesca Di Lorenzo. However, she made it into the main draw as a lucky loser. She was defeated in the first round by Markéta Vondroušová.

Playing at the first edition of the Oracle Challenger Series – Chicago, Barthel reached the final after victories over Lin Zhu, third seed Zarina Diyas, Dayana Yastremska, and sixth seed Sachia Vickery. She lost in the final to second seed Petra Martić. In Quebec City at the Coupe Banque Nationale, Barthel was defeated in the first round by fifth seed Sofia Kenin. Barthel qualified for the Korea Open beating Hanna Chang and Sílvia Soler Espinosa. She lost in the first round to seventh seed Irina-Camelia Begu. In Tashkent at the Tashkent Open, Barthel made it to the semifinals after defeating Nigina Abduraimova, seventh seed Evgeniya Rodina, and second seed Vera Lapko. She lost in her semifinal match to Margarita Gasparyan. Playing in Austria at the Upper Austria Ladies Linz, Barthel was defeated in the first round of qualifying by Ekaterina Alexandrova. Barthel played her final tournament of the season at the Al Habtoor Tennis Challenge in Dubai. Seeded fifth, she lost in her quarterfinal match to second seed and eventual finalist Viktória Kužmová.

Barthel ended the year ranked No. 81.

=== 2019 ===
Barthel began the year at Auckland. She lost in the second round to second seed, defending champion and eventual champion, Julia Görges. At the Australian Open, Barthel was defeated in the first round by 13th seed Anastasija Sevastova.

In Hua Hin at the Thailand Open, Barthel lost in the second round to top seed Garbiñe Muguruza. At the Hungarian Ladies Open, Barthel was defeated in the first round by Irina-Camelia Begu. In March, Barthel competed at the Indian Wells Open. She won a tough first-round match over qualifier Lin Zhu. In the second round, she beat seventeenth seed Madison Keys. In the third round, she defeated 15th seed Julia Görges to advance to the fourth round at Indian Wells for the first time since 2013. She lost in her fourth round match to Venus Williams. Barthel was defeated in the final round of qualifying at the Miami Open to Viktorija Golubic.

Barthel started her clay-court season at the Ladies Open Lugano. She lost in the first round to Sorana Cîrstea. Playing for Germany in the Fed Cup tie versus Latvia, Barthel won her only match played over Jeļena Ostapenko. Germany won the tie versus Latvia 3–1. In Prague, Barthel lost in the first round to ninth seed Barbora Strýcová. At Madrid, she was defeated in the first round of qualifying by Margarita Gasparyan. After qualifying for the Italian Open, Barthel lost in the first round to 14th seed Anett Kontaveit. Competing in Germany at the Nürnberger Versicherungscup, Barthel was defeated in the second round by top seed and eventual champion Yulia Putintseva. At the French Open, Barthel lost in the first round to 24th seed Caroline Garcia.

Barthel started her grass-court season at the Rosmalen Grass Court Championships. She was defeated in the first round by qualifier Greet Minnen. At the Mallorca Open, Barthel lost in the first round of qualifying to Sabine Lisicki. Ranked 96 at the Wimbledon Championships, Barthel suffered a first-round defeat at the hands of lucky loser Marie Bouzková.

Seeded fourth at the Swedish Open, Barthel made it to the quarterfinals where she lost to eventual champion Misaki Doi. In Switzerland at the Ladies Open Lausanne, Barthel was defeated in the first round by eventual champion Fiona Ferro.

Barthel missed the US Open due to a right foot injury.

Barthel didn't play any more tournaments for the rest of the season. She ended the year ranked 172.

=== 2020–2021 ===
Barthel began the 2020 season at the Australian Open where she lost in the first round of qualifying to Shelby Rogers.

Competing at the 2020 Dow Tennis Classic in Midland, Barthel was defeated in the first round by American Jamie Loeb. Playing at the first edition of the Kentucky Open in February 2020, she reached the quarterfinals where she lost to eventual champion Olga Govortsova. At the 2020 Indian Wells Challenger, where she used protected ranking to enter the main-draw, she was defeated in the first round, by eventual champion Irina-Camelia Begu.

At the 2021 Australian Open, Barthel defeated Elisabetta Cocciaretto, before losing to 25th seed Karolína Muchová in the second round.

== Playing style ==
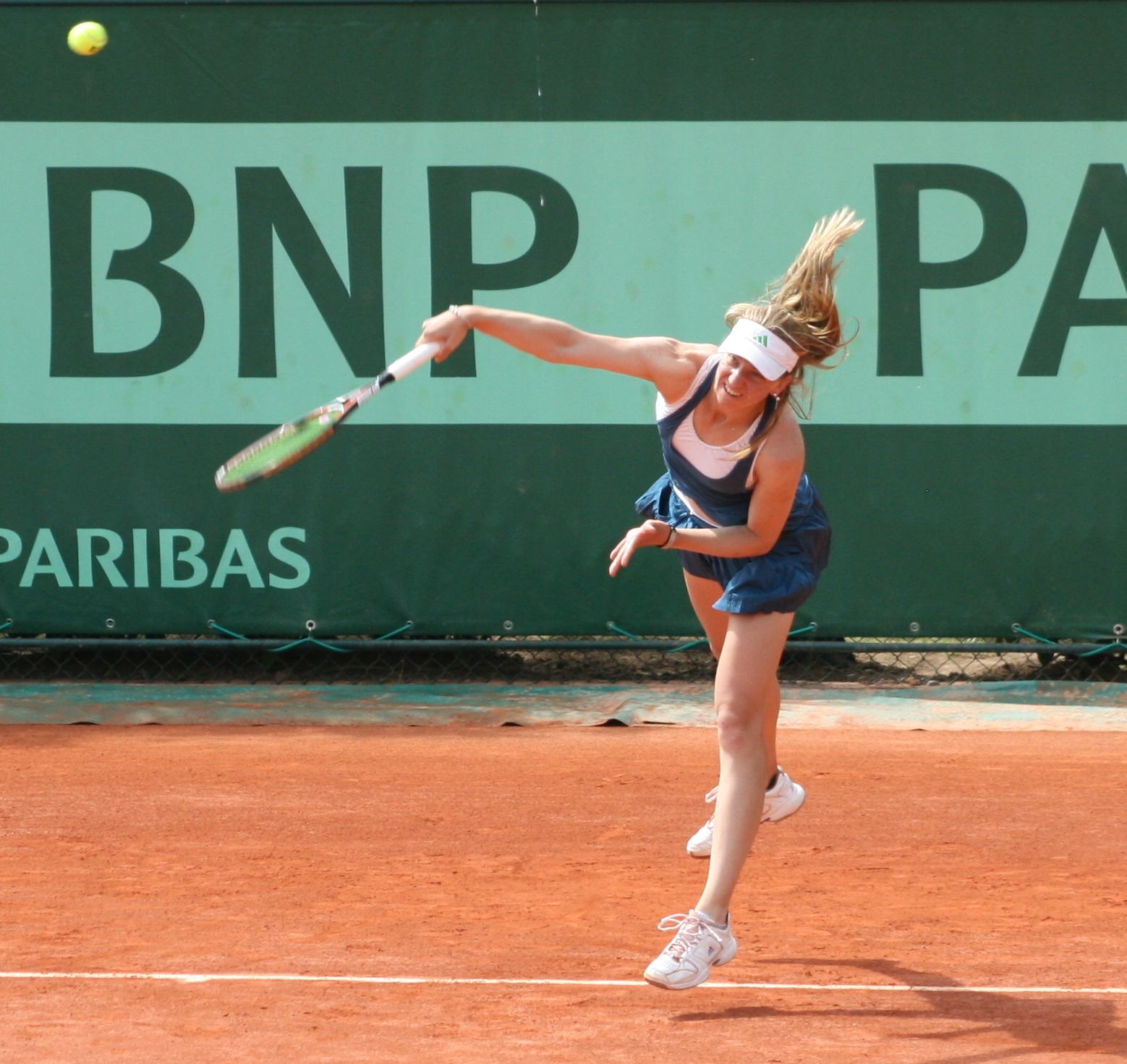
Barthel serving

Barthel plays aggressively, and is primarily known for her power and movement. She is noted for having a strong serve and for hitting shots down the line, as well as for a tendency to approach the net. In her straight-sets victory at the 2013 GDF Suez, she hit 53 winners. Barthel produces deep groundstrokes, and hits powerfully on both the forehand and backhand sides.

On defense, she is noted for her aggressive return of serve, as well as for her scrambling ability.

== Performance timelines ==
Key
W	F	SF	QF	#R	RR	Q#	DNQ	A	NH

(W) winner; (F) finalist; (SF) semifinalist; (QF) quarterfinalist; (#R) rounds 4, 3, 2, 1; (RR) round-robin stage; (Q#) qualification round; (DNQ) did not qualify; (A) absent; (NH) not held; (SR) strike rate (events won / competed); (W–L) win–loss record.
To avoid confusion and double counting, these charts are updated at the conclusion of a tournament or when the player's participation has ended.

Only main-draw results in WTA Tour, Grand Slam tournaments and Olympic Games are included in win–loss records.

=== Singles ===
Current through the 2026 WTA Tour.

Tournament	2010	2011	2012	2013	2014	2015	2016	2017	2018	2019	2020	2021	2022	2023	2024	2025	2026	SR	W–L	Win %
Grand Slam tournaments
Australian Open	A	A	3R	1R	3R	2R	1R	4R	2R	1R	Q1	2R	A	Q1	A	Q1	A	0 / 9	10–9	53%
French Open	A	2R	1R	1R	3R	1R	1R	1R	1R	1R	A	Q2	A	Q2	Q1	Q1	Q1	0 / 9	3–9	25%
Wimbledon	Q1	1R	1R	2R	2R	1R	2R	1R	1R	1R	NH	1R	A	Q1	Q1	Q1	Q1	0 / 10	3–10	23%
US Open	Q1	2R	1R	2R	2R	3R	1R	1R	1R	A	A	Q1	A	Q1	Q1	Q1	Q2	0 / 8	5–8	38%
Win–loss	0–0	2–3	2–4	2–4	6–4	3–4	1–4	3–4	1–4	0–3	0–0	1–2	0–0	0–0	0–0	0–0	0–0	0 / 36	21–36	37%
National representation
Olympic Games	NH		1R	NH			A	NH				1R	NH		A	NH		0 / 2	0–2	0%
Billie Jean King Cup (Note: Formerly known as Fed Cup until 2020.)	A	A	A	PO	A	A	A	A	A	1R	A	A	A	A	A	A	A	0 / 1	2–1	67%
WTA 1000 tournaments
Dubai / Qatar Open (Note: The first Premier 5 event of the year has switched back and forth between the Dubai Tennis Championships and the Qatar Total Open since 2009. Dubai was classified as a Premier 5 event from 2009 to 2011 before being succeeded by Doha for the 2012–2014 period. The two tournaments have since alternated status every year. The Premier 5 tournaments were reclassified as WTA 1000 tournaments in 2021. From 2024, both tournaments were WTA 1000 events.)	A	A	2R	3R	1R	1R	A	2R	1R	A	A	A	A	A	A	A	A	0 / 6	4–6	40%
Indian Wells Open	A	A	2R	4R	1R	2R	A	1R	2R	4R	NH	A	A	A	A	A	A	0 / 7	8–7	53%
Miami Open	A	A	3R	2R	1R	1R	A	Q2	1R	Q2	NH	A	A	A	A	A	A	0 / 5	2–5	29%
Madrid Open	A	A	2R	1R	Q2	1R	A	A	Q2	Q1	NH	Q1	A	A	A	A	A	0 / 3	1–3	25%
Italian Open	A	A	A	A	1R	1R	A	3R	Q2	1R	A	A	A	A	A	A	A	0 / 4	2–4	33%
Canadian Open	A	A	2R	2R	A	Q2	A	Q1	A	A	NH	A	A	A	A	A	A	0 / 2	2–2	50%
Cincinnati Open	A	A	2R	3R	1R	2R	Q1	Q1	A	A	A	A	A	A	A	A	A	0 / 4	4–4	50%
Pan Pac. / Wuhan Open (Note: In 2014, the Toray Pan Pacific Open was downgraded to a Premier event and replaced by the Wuhan Open. The Premier 5 tournaments were reclassified as WTA 1000 tournaments in 2021.)	A	A	A	1R	2R	Q1	A	1R	A	A	NH				A	A	A	0 / 3	1–3	25%
China Open	A	A	1R	1R	2R	2R	A	1R	A	A	NH			A	A	A	A	0 / 5	2–5	29%
Win–loss	0–0	0–0	7–7	7–8	2–7	3–7	0–0	3–5	1–3	3–2	0–0	0–0	0–0	0–0	0–0	0–0	0–0	0 / 39	26–39	40%
Career statistics
	2010	2011	2012	2013	2014	2015	2016	2017	2018	2019	2020	2021	2022	2023	2024	2025	2026	Career		
Tournaments	1	6	25	23	24	26	13	19	20	13	0	12	0	0	2	0	2	Career total: 186		
Titles	0	0	1	1	1	0	0	1	0	0	0	0	0	0	0	0	0	Career total: 4		
Finals	0	0	1	2	1	2	0	1	0	0	0	0	0	0	0	0	0	Career total: 7		
Overall win–loss	0–1	5–6	29–23	25–23	23–23	24–26	6–12	17–18	14–20	7–13	0–0	3–12	0–0	0–0	0–2	0–0	0–2	4 / 186	153–181	46%
Year-end ranking	208	67	39	34	43	44	183	48	81	172	228	272	275	245	166	230	197			

=== Doubles ===
Tournament	2012	2013	2014	2015	2016	2017	2018	2019	2020	2021	SR	W–L
Grand Slam tournaments
Australian Open	1R	1R	1R	2R	1R	A	2R	1R	1R	2R	0 / 9	3–9
French Open	1R	2R	1R	1R	A	1R	A	A	A	A	0 / 5	1–5
Wimbledon	1R	1R	1R	3R	1R	2R	A	1R	NH	2R	0 / 8	4–8
US Open	2R	2R	1R	2R	1R	2R	A	A	A	A	0 / 6	4–6
Win–loss	1–4	2–4	0–4	4–4	0–3	2–3	1–1	0–2	0–1	2–2	0 / 28	12–28
Career statistics
Titles	0	1	0	1	0	0	0	1	0	0	3	
Finals	0	1	1	1	0	0	0	1	0	0	4	
Year-end ranking	255	89	111	67	787	232	134	106	122	130		

== WTA Tour finals ==
=== Singles: 7 (4 titles, 3 runner-ups) ===
Legend Grand Slam tournaments Premier M & Premier 5 Premier (1–0) International (3–3)	Finals by surface Hard (2–2) Clay (2–1) Grass (0–0)

Result	W–L	Date	Tournament	Tier	Surface	Opponent	Score
Win	1–0	Jan 2012	Hobart International, Australia	International	Hard	(Belgium) Yanina Wickmayer	6–1, 6–2
Loss	1–1	Jan 2013	Hobart International, Australia	International	Hard	(Russia) Elena Vesnina	3–6, 4–6
Win	2–1	Feb 2013	Open GDF Suez, France	Premier	Hard (i)	(Italy) Sara Errani	7–5, 7–6^{(7–4)}
Win	3–1	Jul 2014	Swedish Open, Sweden	International	Clay	(South Africa) Chanelle Scheepers	6–3, 7–6^{(7–3)}
Loss	3–2	Jul 2015	Swedish Open, Sweden	International	Clay	(Sweden) Johanna Larsson	3–6, 6–7^{(2–7)}
Loss	3–3	Oct 2015	Luxembourg Open, Luxembourg	International	Hard (i)	(Japan) Misaki Doi	4–6, 7–6^{(9–7)}, 0–6
Win	4–3	May 2017	Prague Open, Czech Republic	International	Clay	(Czech Republic) Kristýna Plíšková	2–6, 7–5, 6–2

=== Doubles: 4 (3 titles, 1 runner–up) ===
Legend Grand Slam tournaments Premier M & Premier 5 Premier (2–0) International (1–1)	Finals by surface Hard (1–1) Clay (2–0) Grass (0–0)

Result	W–L	Date	Tournament	Tier	Surface	Partner	Opponents	Score
Win	1–0	Apr 2013	Stuttgart Grand Prix, Germany	Premier	Clay (i)	(Germany) Sabine Lisicki	(United States) Bethanie Mattek-Sands (India) Sania Mirza	6–4, 7–5
Loss	1–1	Sep 2014	Korea Open, South Korea	International	Hard	(Luxembourg) Mandy Minella	(Spain) Lara Arruabarrena (Romania) Irina-Camelia Begu	3–6, 3–6
Win	2–1	Oct 2015	Luxembourg Open, Luxembourg	International	Hard (i)	(Germany) Laura Siegemund	(Spain) Anabel Medina Garrigues (Spain) Arantxa Parra Santonja	6–2, 7–6^{(7–2)}
Win	3–1	Apr 2019	Stuttgart Grand Prix, Germany (2)	Premier	Clay (i)	(Germany) Anna-Lena Friedsam	(Russia) Anastasia Pavlyuchenkova (Czech Republic) Lucie Šafářová	2–6, 6–3, [10–6]

== WTA Challenger finals ==
=== Singles: 2 (2 runner-ups) ===
Result	W–L	Date	Tournament	Surface	Opponent	Score
Loss	0–1	Sep 2018	WTA 125 Chicago, United States	Hard	(Croatia) Petra Martić	4–6, 1–6
Loss	0–2	Sep 2026	WTA 125 Ljubljana, Slovenia	Clay	(Italy) Samira De Stefano	6–3, 1–6, 5–7

=== Doubles: 2 (1 title, 1 runner-up) ===
Result	W–L	Date	Tournament	Surface	Partner	Opponents	Score
Win	1–0	Sep 2018	WTA 125 Chicago, United States	Hard	(Czech Republic) Kristýna Plíšková	(United States) Asia Muhammad (United States) Maria Sanchez	6–3, 6–2
Loss	1–1	Aug 2021	WTA 125 Chicago, United States	Hard	(Chinese Taipei) Hsieh Yu-chieh	(Japan) Eri Hozumi (Thailand) Peangtarn Plipuech	5–7, 2–6

== ITF Circuit finals ==
=== Singles: 19 (8 titles, 11 runner–ups) ===
Legend $75,000 tournaments (1–0) $50/60,000 tournaments (3–5) $40,000 tournaments (0–1) $25,000 tournaments (3–3) $10,000 tournaments (1–2)	Finals by surface Hard (7–8) Clay (1–2) Grass (0–1)

Result	W–L	Date	Tournament	Tier	Surface	Opponent	Score
Loss	0–1	Jul 2008	ITF Frinton, United Kingdom	10,000	Grass	(United Kingdom) Tara Moore	5–7, 1–6
Loss	0–2	Jul 2008	ITF Gausdal, Norway	10,000	Hard	(Germany) Svenja Weidemann	2–6, 3–6
Win	1–2	Jan 2010	ITF Wrexham, United Kingdom	10,000	Hard	(Luxembourg) Anne Kremer	6–1, 6–1
Win	2–2	Apr 2010	ITF Torhout, Belgium	50,000	Hard (i)	(Canada) Rebecca Marino	2–6, 6–4, 6–2
Win	3–2	Jan 2011	ITF Andrézieux-Bouthéon, France	25,000	Hard (i)	(Liechtenstein) Stephanie Vogt	6–3, 3–6, 6–4
Loss	3–3	Feb 2011	ITF Sutton, United Kingdom	25,000	Hard (i)	(France) Kristina Mladenovic	3–6, 6–1, 2–6
Loss	3–4	Aug 2011	ITF Bronx, United States	50,000	Hard	(Czech Republic) Andrea Hlaváčková	6–7^{(8–10)}, 3–6
Win	4–4	Sep 2011	ITF Mestre, Italy	50,000	Clay	(Spain) Garbiñe Muguruza	7–5, 6–2
Win	5–4	Sep 2011	ITF Shrewsbury, United Kingdom	75,000	Hard (i)	(United Kingdom) Heather Watson	6–0, 6–3
Loss	5–5	Aug 2022	ITF Danderyd, Sweden	25,000	Clay	(Czech Republic) Brenda Fruhvirtová	1–6, 3–6
Loss	5–6	Nov 2022	ITF Helsinki, Finland	25,000	Hard (i)	(United States) Taylor Ng	4–6, 6–2, 6–7^{(5–7)}
Win	6–6	Nov 2022	ITF Pétange, Luxembourg	25,000	Hard (i)	(Ukraine) Daria Snigur	7–6^{(7–2)}, 6–2
Loss	6–7	Jan 2023	ITF Sunderland, United Kingdom	60,000	Hard (i)	(Belgium) Greet Minnen	2–6, 6–1, 0–6
Loss	6–8	Oct 2023	ITF Glasgow, United Kingdom	60,000	Hard (i)	(Ukraine) Daria Snigur	4–6, 4–6
Win	7–8	Nov 2023	ITF Ortisei, Italy	25,000	Hard (i)	(Latvia) Diāna Marcinkēviča	6–2, 6–7^{(6–8)}, 6–4
Loss	7–9	Mar 2024	ITF Croissy-Beaubourg, France	60,000	Hard (i)	(United Kingdom) Lily Miyazaki	4–6, 5–7
Loss	7–10	May 2024	ITF Trnava, Slovakia	60,000	Clay	(Japan) Moyuka Uchijima	6–7^{(3–7)}, 3–6
Win	8–10	Nov 2024	ITF Hamburg, Germany	60,000	Hard (i)	(United Kingdom) Sonay Kartal	6–4, 7–6^{(8–6)}
Loss	8–11	Mar 2026	ITF Nantes, France	40,000	Hard (i)	(Belgium) Jeline Vandromme	2–3 ret.

=== Doubles: 6 (2 titles, 4 runner–ups) ===
Legend $50,000 tournaments (1–2) $25,000 tournaments (1–1) $10,000 tournaments (0–1)	Finals by surface Hard (1–3) Clay (1–1)

Result	W–L	Date	Tournament	Tier	Surface	Partner	Opponents	Score
Loss	0–1	Jul 2008	ITF Gausdal, Norway	10,000	Hard	(Germany) Svenja Weidemann	(South Africa) Tegan Edwards (Netherlands) Marcella Koek	6–1, 4–6, [8–10]
Loss	0–2	Feb 2010	ITF Biberach, Germany	50,000	Hard (i)	(Germany) Carmen Klaschka	(France) Stéphanie Cohen-Aloro (Tunisia) Selima Sfar	7–5, 1–6, [5–10]
Win	1–2	Apr 2010	ITF Torhout, Belgium	50,000	Hard (i)	(Germany) Justine Ozga	(Czech Republic) Hana Birnerová (Russia) Ekaterina Bychkova	7–5, 6–2
Loss	1–3	May 2021	ITF La Bisbal d'Empordà, Spain	60,000	Clay	(Luxembourg) Mandy Minella	(Russia) Valentina Ivakhnenko (Romania) Andreea Prisăcariu	3–6, 1–6
Loss	1–4	Mar 2022	ITF Joué-lès-Tours, France	25,000	Hard (i)	(Belgium) Yanina Wickmayer	(United Kingdom) Emily Appleton (United Kingdom) Ali Collins	6–2, 4–6, [6–10]
Win	2–4	May 2022	ITF Båstad, Sweden	25,000	Clay	(Sweden) Caijsa Hennemann	(France) Julie Belgraver (Sweden) Fanny Östlund	6–1, 6–4

== Top 10 wins ==
Barthel has a 5–22 record against players who were, at the time the match was played, ranked in the top 10.

Season	2012	2013	2014	2015	2016–2025	Total
Wins	1	3	0	1	0	5

#	Player	Rank	Event	Surface	Rd	Score	Rank
2012
1.	(France) Marion Bartoli	No. 7	Stuttgart Open, Germany	Clay (i)	2R	6–3, 6–1	No. 35
2013
2.	(France) Marion Bartoli	No. 10	Open GDF Suez, France	Hard (i)	QF	7–6^{(7–6)}, 6–4	No. 45
3.	(Italy) Sara Errani	No. 7	Open GDF Suez, France	Hard (i)	F	7–5, 7–6^{(7–4)}	No. 45
4.	(Germany) Angelique Kerber	No. 6	Qatar Open	Hard	2R	6–1, 6–2	No. 32
2015
5.	(Canada) Eugenie Bouchard	No. 7	Diamond Games, Belgium	Hard (i)	2R	4–6, 6–1, 6–2	No. 42
