= Save Cup =

ITF Women's Circuit tennis tournament

ITF Women's Tour
- Event name: Mestre
- Location: Mestre, Italy
- Venue: Tennis Club Mestre
- Category: ITF Women's Circuit
- Surface: Clay
- Draw: 32S/32Q/16D
- Prize money: $50,000
- Website: Official website

The Save Cup was a tournament for professional female tennis players played on outdoor clay courts. The event was classified as a $50,000 ITF Women's Circuit tournament and was held in Mestre, Italy, from 2003 to 2013.

== Past finals ==
=== Singles ===
Year	Champion	Runner-up	Score
2013	(France) Claire Feuerstein	(Slovenia) Nastja Kolar	6–1, 7–6^{(7–2)}
2012	(Italy) Karin Knapp	(Spain) Estrella Cabeza Candela	6–1, 3–6, 6–1
2011	(Germany) Mona Barthel	(Spain) Garbiñe Muguruza	7–5, 6–2
2010	(Czech Republic) Zuzana Ondrášková	(Czech Republic) Lucie Hradecká	6–3, 6–3
2009	(Croatia) Karolina Šprem	(Austria) Yvonne Meusburger	2–6, 6–2, 6–4
2008	(Russia) Ekaterina Ivanova	(Italy) Romina Oprandi	6–3, 3–0, retired
2007	(Paraguay) Rossana de los Ríos	(Russia) Alisa Kleybanova	6–4, 3–6, 6–1
2006	(Croatia) Sanja Ančić	(Germany) Sandra Klösel	6–1, 6–2
2005	(Slovakia) Magdaléna Rybáriková	(Hungary) Kira Nagy	6–1, 7–5
2004	(Morocco) Bahia Mouhtassine	(Netherlands) Michelle Gerards	6–1, 6–0
2003	(Czech Republic) Lenka Šnajdrová	(Czech Republic) Lucie Hradecká	6–3, 1–6, 6–2

=== Doubles ===
Year	Champions	Runners-up	Score
2013	(France) Laura Thorpe (Liechtenstein) Stephanie Vogt	(Czech Republic) Petra Krejsová (Czech Republic) Tereza Smitková	7–6^{(7–5)}, 7–5
2012	(Argentina) Mailen Auroux (Argentina) María Irigoyen	(Hungary) Réka-Luca Jani (Serbia) Teodora Mirčić	5–7, 6–4, [10–8]
2011	(Ukraine) Valentyna Ivakhnenko (Russia) Marina Melnikova	(Hungary) Tímea Babos (Poland) Magda Linette	6–4, 7–5
2010	(Italy) Claudia Giovine (Italy) Karin Knapp	(Czech Republic) Eva Birnerová (Slovenia) Andreja Klepač	6–7^{(6–8)}, 7–5, [13–11]
2009	(Austria) Sandra Klemenschits (Italy) Romina Oprandi	(Germany) Kristina Barrois (Austria) Yvonne Meusburger	6–4, 6–1
2008	(Bosnia and Herzegovina) Mervana Jugić-Salkić (France) Aurélie Védy	(Georgia (country)) Margalita Chakhnashvili (France) Violette Huck	6–2, 6–3
2007	(Russia) Alisa Kleybanova (Estonia) Margit Rüütel	(Bosnia and Herzegovina) Mervana Jugić-Salkić (Belarus) Darya Kustova	6–2, 7–5
2006	(Romania) Monica Niculescu (Czech Republic) Renata Voráčová	(Georgia (country)) Margalita Chakhnashvili (Germany) Tatjana Malek	6–4, 3–6, 6–4
2005	(Hungary) Rita Kuti-Kis (Hungary) Kira Nagy	(Italy) Elisa Balsamo (Italy) Emily Stellato	7–5, 6–4
2004	(Spain) Rosa María Andrés Rodríguez (Spain) Lourdes Domínguez Lino	(Hungary) Katalin Marosi (Brazil) Marina Tavares	6–1, 6–2
2003	(New Zealand) Leanne Baker (Italy) Francesca Lubiani	(Australia) Monique Adamczak (New Zealand) Shelley Stephens	6–2, 4–6, 6–2
